= George Hesketh =

England international rugby league footballer

Personal information
- Full name: George Hesketh
- Born: unknown
- Died: 1 March 1954

Playing information
- Position: Stand-off, Loose forward
Club
Years	Team	Pld	T	G	FG	P
1914–23	Wigan	175	26	26		130
1923–30	Oldham	194	31	61		215
	Total	369	57	87	0	345
Representative
Years	Team	Pld	T	G	FG	P
1920–21	Lancashire	2	0	0	0	0
1925	England	1	0	0	0	0

George Hesketh (unknown – 1 March 1954) was an English professional rugby league footballer who played in the 1910s, 1920s and 1930s. He played at representative level for England, and at club level for Wigan and Oldham, as a stand-off, or loose forward.

== Playing career ==
=== International honours ===
George Hesketh won a cap for England while at Oldham in 1925 against Wales.

=== Championship final appearances ===
George Hesketh played scrum-half in Wigan's 13–2 victory over Oldham in the Championship Final during the 1921–22 season at The Cliff, Broughton on Saturday 6 May 1922.

=== County League appearances ===
George Hesketh played in Wigan's victories in the Lancashire League during the 1914–15 season, 1920–21 season and 1922–23 season.

=== Challenge Cup Final appearances ===
George Hesketh played stand-off in Oldham's 4–21 defeat by Wigan in the 1923–24 Challenge Cup Final during the 1923–24 season at Athletic Grounds, Rochdale on Saturday 12 April 1924. About George Hesketh's time, there was Oldham's 16–3 victory over Hull Kingston Rovers in the 1924–25 Challenge Cup Final during the 1924–25 season at Headingley, the 3–9 defeat by Swinton in the 1925–26 Challenge Cup Final during the 1925–26 season at Athletic Grounds, Rochdale, and the 26–7 victory over Swinton in the 1926–27 Challenge Cup Final during the 1926–27 season at Central Park, Wigan.

=== County Cup Final appearances ===
George Hesketh played loose forward in Oldham's 10–0 victory over St Helens Recs in the 1924–25 Lancashire Cup Final during the 1924–25 season at The Willows, Salford on Saturday 22 November 1924.

=== Club career ===
George Hesketh made his début for Wigan in the 16–7 victory over Hull Kingston Rovers at Craven Street (not to be confused with Old Craven Park), Hull on Friday 25 December 1914, he scored his first try for Wigan in the 20–2 victory over Salford at Central Park, Wigan on Saturday 23 September 1916, he scored his last try for Wigan in the 23–2 victory over Widnes at Central Park, Wigan on Saturday 30 September 1922, he played his last match for Wigan in the 41–10 victory over St. Helens at Central Park, Wigan on Saturday 7 April 1923.
