= Bob Sloman =

GB & England international rugby league footballer

Personal information
- Full name: Robert Sloman
- Born: c. 1898 Plymouth, England
- Died: December 1970 (aged 72) Plymouth, England

Playing information
- Height: 6 ft 0 in (1.83 m)
- Weight: 13 st 7 lb (86 kg)

Rugby union
Club
| Years | Team | Pld | T | G | FG | P |
|---|---|---|---|---|---|---|
| ≤1921–21 | Plymouth Albion R.F.C. |

Rugby league
- Position: Second-row
Club
| Years | Team | Pld | T | G | FG | P |
|---|---|---|---|---|---|---|
| 1921–29 | Oldham | 268 | 40 | 4 | | 128 |
Representative
| Years | Team | Pld | T | G | FG | P |
| 1923–28 | England | 5 | 0 | 0 | 0 | 0 |
| 1928 | Great Britain | 5 | 0 | 0 | 0 | 0 |

Robert Sloman (c. 1898 – December 1970) was an English rugby union and professional rugby league footballer who played in the 1920s. He played club level rugby union (RU) or Plymouth Albion, and representative level rugby league (RL) for Great Britain and England, and at club level for Oldham (captain), as a second-row.

== Background ==
Bob Sloman was born in Plymouth, Devon, England, and he died aged 72 in Plymouth, Devon, England

== Playing career ==
=== Championship final appearances ===
Sloman played at second-row in Oldham's 2–13 defeat by Wigan in the Championship Final during the 1921–22 season at The Cliff, Broughton on Saturday 6 May 1922, in front of a crowd of 26,700.

=== County League appearances ===
Sloman played in Oldham's victory in the Lancashire League during the 1921–22 season.

=== Challenge Cup Final appearances ===
Sloman played at second-row in Oldham's 4–21 defeat by Wigan in the 1923–24 Challenge Cup Final during the 1923–24 season at Athletic Grounds, Rochdale on Saturday 12 April 1924, in front of a crowd of 12,000. played at second-row in the 16–3 victory over Hull Kingston Rovers in the 1924–25 Challenge Cup Final during the 1924–25 season at Headingley, Leeds, in front of a crowd of 41,831, played at second-row in the 3–9 defeat by Swinton in the 1925–26 Challenge Cup Final during the 1925–26 season at Athletic Grounds, Rochdale, in front of a crowd of 28,500, and played at second-row, and scored a try in the 26–7 victory over Swinton in the 1926–27 Challenge Cup Final during the 1926–27 season at Central Park, Wigan, in front of a crowd of 27,800.

=== County Cup Final appearances ===
Sloman played at second-row in Oldham's 10–0 victory over St Helens Recs in the 1924 Lancashire Cup Final during the 1924–25 season at The Willows, Salford on Saturday 22 November 1924, in front of a crowd of 15,000.

=== Club career ===
Sloman changed rugby football codes from rugby union to rugby league when he transferred from Plymouth Albion R.F.C. to Oldham during August 1921.

=== International honours ===
Sloman won caps for England while at Oldham in 1923 against Wales, in 1924 against Other Nationalities, in 1925 against Wales, in 1926 against Wales, in 1928 against Wales, and won caps for Great Britain while at Oldham in 1928 against Australia (3 matches), and New Zealand (2 matches).

Sloman was selected for Great Britain while at Oldham for the 1924 Great Britain Lions tour of Australia and New Zealand, he did not play in any of the Test matches on this tour.
