= Ernie Knapman =

GB & England dual-code rugby international footballer

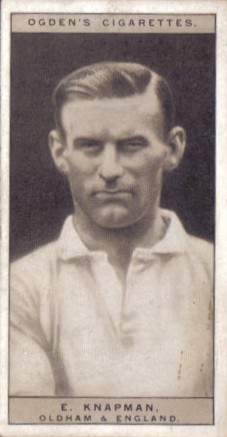
- Ogden's Cigarette card featuring Ernest Knapman

Personal information
- Full name: Ernest Henry Knapman
- Born: 28 March 1898; Torquay district, England
- Died: 2 October 1982 (aged 84); Torquay, England

Playing information
- Height: 5 ft 8 in (1.73 m)
- Weight: 12 st 0 lb (76 kg)

Rugby union
- Position: Fullback
Club
Years	Team	Pld	T	G	FG	P
≤1920–21	Torquay RUFC
Representative
Years	Team	Pld	T	G	FG	P
≤1921–≤21	Devon	7
≤1920–≥20	South of England
≤1920–≥20	England (non-Test)

Rugby league
- Position: Fullback
Club
Years	Team	Pld	T	G	FG	P
1921–27	Oldham	206	7	124		269
Representative
Years	Team	Pld	T	G	FG	P
1925	England	1	0	3	0	6
1924	Great Britain	1	0	0	0	0

Ernest Henry Knapman (28 March 1898 – 2 October 1982) was an English rugby union and professional rugby league footballer who played in the 1920s. He played representative level rugby union (RU) for England (non-Test), South of England and Devon, and at club level for Torquay RUFC as a fullback, and representative level rugby league (RL) for Great Britain and England, and at club level for Oldham, as a fullback.

== Background ==
Knapman's birth was registered in Okehampton district, Devon.

== Playing career ==
=== International honours ===
Knapman represented England (RU) while at Torquay in 1920 against the North of England, won a cap for England (RL) while at Oldham in 1925 against Wales, and won a cap for Great Britain (RL) while at Oldham in 1924 in the 8–16 defeat by New Zealand at Carlaw Park, Auckland on Saturday 2 August 1924.

=== Region and county honours ===
Knapman represented South of England (RU) while at Torquay in 1920 against the North of England, and represented Devon (RU) on seven occasions while at Torquay.

=== Championship final appearances ===
Knapman played fullback in Oldham's 2–13 defeat by Wigan in the Championship Final during the 1921–22 season at The Cliff, Broughton on Saturday 6 May 1922.

=== County League appearances ===
About Knapman's time, there was Oldham's victory in the Lancashire League during the 1921–22 season .

=== Challenge Cup Final appearances ===
Knapman played fullback, and scored a penalty goal in Oldham's 4–21 defeat by Wigan in the 1924 Challenge Cup Final during the 1923–24 season at Athletic Grounds, Rochdale on Saturday 12 April 1924. About Ernest Knapman's time, there was Oldham's 16–3 victory over Hull Kingston Rovers in the 1925 Challenge Cup Final during the 1924–25 season at Headingley, the 3–9 defeat by Swinton in the 1926 Challenge Cup Final during the 1925–26 season at Athletic Grounds, Rochdale, and the 26–7 victory over Swinton in the 1927 Challenge Cup Final during the 1926–27 season at Central Park, Wigan.

=== County Cup Final appearances ===
About Knapman's time, there was Oldham's 5–7 defeat by Warrington in the 1921 Lancashire Cup Final during the 1921–22 season at The Cliff, Broughton, Salford on Saturday 3 December 1921, and played fullback in the 10–0 victory over St Helens Recs in the 1924 Lancashire Cup Final during the 1924–25 season at The Willows, Salford on Saturday 22 November 1924.

== Contemporaneous article extract ==
"E. Knapman Oldham and England (Northern Rugby league.) One of the finest defensive players in the League is Ernest Knapman, who joined Oldham in January 1921. He played as schoolboy for Upton School, Torquay, and in 1920 was full back for his town fifteen. He appeared seven times in the Rugby Union County Championship, and in 1920 played for England against the North at Bradford, and for the South against the North at Leicester. He was reserve for England against Wales in 1920, and a member of the touring side to Australasia in 1924. He was born in Torquay in 1899."
