= Sid Rix =

GB & England international rugby league footballer

Personal information
- Full name: Sidney Rix
- Born: c. 1899 Salford, England
- Died: 10 March 1970 (aged 71) Eccles, England

Playing information
- Position: Wing, Centre
Club
Years	Team	Pld	T	G	FG	P
1918–32	Oldham	330	155	4		473
Representative
Years	Team	Pld	T	G	FG	P
1924–26	England	4	5	0	0	15
1924–27	Great Britain	9	3	0	0	9

Sidney "Sid" Rix (c. 1899 – 10 March 1970) was an English professional rugby league footballer who played in the 1910s, 1920s and 1930s. He played at representative level for Great Britain and England, and at club level for Oldham, as a wing or centre.

== Background ==
Sid Rix was born in Irlam o'the Heights, Lancashire, England, his birth was registered in Salford, Lancashire, England.

== Playing career ==
=== International honours ===
Rix won caps for England while at Oldham in 1924 against Other Nationalities, in 1925 against Wales, in 1926 against Wales, and Other Nationalities, and won caps for Great Britain while at Oldham in 1924 against Australia (3 matches), New Zealand (3 matches), and in 1926–27 against New Zealand (3 matches).

=== County League appearances ===
About Rix's time there was Oldham's victory in the Lancashire League during the 1921–22 season.

=== Challenge Cup Final appearances ===
Rix played on the wing in Oldham's 4–21 defeat by Wigan in the 1924 Challenge Cup Final during the 1923–24 season at Athletic Grounds, Rochdale on Saturday 12 April 1924. About Sidney Rix's time, there was Oldham's 16–3 victory over Hull Kingston Rovers in the 1925 Challenge Cup Final during the 1924–25 season at Headingley, the 3–9 defeat by Swinton in the 1926 Challenge Cup Final during the 1925–26 season at Athletic Grounds, Rochdale, and the 26–7 victory over Swinton in the 1927 Challenge Cup Final during the 1926–27 season at Central Park, Wigan.

=== County Cup Final appearances ===
About Rix's time, there was Oldham's 5–7 defeat by Warrington in the 1921 Lancashire Cup Final during the 1921–22 season at The Cliff, Broughton, Salford on Saturday 3 December 1921, and played at centre in the 10–0 victory over St Helens Recs in the 1924 Lancashire Cup Final during the 1924–25 season at The Willows, Salford on Saturday 22 November 1924.
