= Albert Brough =

Great Britain international rugby league footballer

Personal information
- Full name: Albert Brough
- Born: 20 July 1895; Barrow-in-Furness, England
- Died: 28 May 1980 (aged 84); Chichester, England

Playing information
- Height: 5 ft 9 in (1.75 m)
- Position: Second-row, Loose forward
Club
Years	Team	Pld	T	G	FG	P
	Barrow
1923–29	Oldham	170	68	185	0	574
	Total	170	68	185	0	574
Representative
Years	Team	Pld	T	G	FG	P
	Lancashire
1924	Great Britain	2	2	0	0	6
Association football career
- Position(s): Fullback, Goalkeeper
Senior career*
Years	Team	Apps	(Gls)
≤1921–23	Barrow A.F.C.	15	(TBC)
1929-30	Mossley	7	(1)
- * Club domestic league appearances and goals

Albert Brough MM (20 July 1895 – 28 May 1980) was an English professional rugby league and association football (soccer) footballer who played in the 1920s. He played representative level rugby league (RL) for Great Britain and Lancashire, and at club level for Barrow and Oldham, as a second-row, or loose forward, and club level association football (soccer) for Barrow A.F.C. and Mossley, as a fullback, or goalkeeper.

== Background ==
Albert Brough was born in Barrow-in-Furness, Lancashire, England, he was awarded the Military Medal during World War I for bravery in the field, he died aged 84 in Chichester, West Sussex, England.

== Rugby league playing career ==
=== International honours ===
Albert Brough won caps for Great Britain (RL) while at Oldham in 1924 against Australia, and New Zealand.

=== Challenge Cup Final appearances ===
Albert Brough played right-second-row and scored a penalty goal in Oldham's 4–21 defeat by Wigan in the 1923–24 Challenge Cup Final during the 1923–24 season at Athletic Grounds, Rochdale on Saturday 12 April 1924, in front of a crowd of 41,831, he played right-second-row, and scored a try in the 16–3 victory over Hull Kingston Rovers in the 1924–25 Challenge Cup Final during the 1924–25 season at Headingley, Leeds on Saturday 25 April 1925, in front of a crowd of 28,335, he played left-wing in the 3–9 defeat by Swinton in the 1925–26 Challenge Cup Final during the 1925–26 season at Athletic Grounds, Rochdale on Saturday 1 May 1926, in front of a crowd of 27,000, and he played loose forward in the 26–7 victory over Swinton in the 1926–27 Challenge Cup Final during the 1926–27 season at Central Park, Wigan on Saturday 7 May 1927, in front of a crowd of 33,448.

=== County Cup Final appearances ===
Albert Brough played right-second-row in Oldham's 10–0 victory over St Helens Recs in the 1924 Lancashire Cup Final during the 1924–25 season at The Willows, Salford on Saturday 22 November 1924.

== Association football (soccer) playing career ==
Albert Brough normally played as a fullback, however he played goalkeeper in Barrow A.F.C.'s 1–4 defeat by Durham City A.F.C. in the last game of the 1922–23 Football League season of the Football League Third Division North at Kepier Haughs, Durham. He also played for Mossley in the 1929–30 season of the Cheshire County League, making seven appearances and scoring one goal.
