= Rothwell Marlor =

England international rugby league footballer

Personal information
- Full name: Rothwell Marlor
- Born: second ¼ 1893 Oldham, England
- Died: second ¼ 1954 (aged 60–61) Oldham, England

Playing information
- Height: 5 ft 8.5 in (1.74 m)
- Weight: 14 st 0 lb (89 kg)
- Position: Prop, Second-row
Club
Years	Team	Pld	T	G	FG	P
1913–28	Oldham	264	32	2		100
Representative
Years	Team	Pld	T	G	FG	P
1921	England	2	0	0	0	0

Rothwell Marlor (second ¼ 1893 – second ¼ 1954), also known by the nickname of "Rod", was an English professional rugby league footballer who played in the 1910s and 1920s. He played at representative level for England, and at club level for Salem Rangers ARLFC (in Salem, Oldham) and Oldham, as a prop or second-row.

== Background ==
Rothwell Marlor's birth was registered in Oldham, Lancashire, and his death aged 60–61 was registered in Oldham, Lancashire, England.

== Playing career ==
=== Championship final appearances ===
Marlor played at second-row in Oldham's 2-13 defeat by Wigan in the Championship Final during the 1921–22 season at The Cliff, Broughton on Saturday 6 May 1922.

=== County Leagues appearances ===
Marlor played in Oldham's victory in the Lancashire League during the 1921–22 season.

=== Challenge Cup Final appearances ===
About Rothwell Marlor's time, there was Oldham's 16-3 victory over Hull Kingston Rovers in the 1925 Challenge Cup Final during the 1924–25 season at Headingley, the 3-9 defeat by Swinton in the 1926 Challenge Cup Final during the 1925–26 season at Athletic Grounds, Rochdale, and the 26-7 victory over Swinton in the 1927 Challenge Cup Final during the 1926–27 season at Central Park, Wigan.

=== County Cup Final appearances ===
About Rothwell Marlor's time, there was Oldham's 5-7 defeat by Warrington in the 1921 Lancashire Cup Final during the 1921–22 season at The Cliff, Broughton, Salford on Saturday 3 December 1921, and played at second-row in the 10-0 victory over St Helens Recs in the 1924 Lancashire Cup Final during the 1924–25 season at The Willows, Salford on Saturday 22 November 1924.

=== International honours ===
Marlor won caps for England while at Oldham in 1921 against Wales, and Other Nationalities.
