= Sid Jerram =

Wales international rugby league footballer

Personal information
- Full name: Sidney George Jerram
- Born: second ¼ 1891; Swansea district, Wales
- Died: 1959 (aged c. 67–68); Swansea, Wales

Playing information

Rugby union
- Position: Scrum-half
Club
Years	Team	Pld	T	G	FG	P
1911–13	Swansea RFC

Rugby league
- Position: Stand-off, Scrum-half
Club
Years	Team	Pld	T	G	FG	P
1914–27	Wigan	245	54	20		202
1927–≥27	Wigan Highfield
	Total	245	54	20	0	202
Representative
Years	Team	Pld	T	G	FG	P
1921	Other Nationalities	1
1921–25	Wales	5

Sidney George Jerram (second ¼ 1891 – 1959) was a Welsh rugby union, and professional rugby league footballer who played in the 1910s and 1920s. He played club level rugby union (RU) for Swansea RFC, as a scrum-half, and representative level rugby league (RL) for Wales and Other Nationalities, and at club level for Wigan and Wigan Highfield, as a stand-off or scrum-half.

== Background ==
Sid Jerram's birth was registered in Swansea, Wales, and he died aged c. 67–68 in Swansea, Wales.

== Playing career ==
=== Change of code ===
Following a meeting with a Wigan rugby league club representative at the Bush Hotel, Swansea on Sunday 28 September 1913, Swansea RFC's rugby union half-back pairing of Sidney Jerram, and George Owens were each signed for £180 down payment (based on increases in average earnings, this would be approximately £61,630 in 2013), guaranteed win bonuses, and jobs for £2 per week cash.

=== International honours ===
Jerram won caps for Wales (RL) while at Wigan in 1921 against England and Australia, in 1923 against England (two spells), and in 1925 against England (two spells), and won a cap for Other Nationalities (RL) while at Wigan in 1921 against England.

=== Notable tour matches ===
Sid Jerram played scrum-half in Swansea RFC's 3–0 victory over South Africa in the 1912–13 South Africa rugby union tour at St. Helen's Rugby and Cricket Ground, Swansea on Thursday 26 December 1912.

=== Championship final appearances ===
Sid Jerram played stand-off in Wigan's 13–2 victory over Oldham in the Championship Final during the 1921–22 season at The Cliff, Broughton on Saturday 6 May 1922.

=== County League appearances ===
Sid Jerram played in Wigan's victories in the Lancashire League during the 1920–21 season, 1922–23 season, 1923–24 season and 1925–26 season.

=== Challenge Cup Final appearances ===
Sid Jerram played stand-off in Wigan's 21–4 victory over Oldham in the 1923–24 Challenge Cup Final during the 1923–24 season at Athletic Grounds, Rochdale on Saturday 12 April 1924.

=== County Cup Final appearances ===
Sid Jerram played scrum-half in Wigan's 20–2 victory over Leigh in the 1922–23 Lancashire Cup Final during the 1922–23 season at The Willows, Salford on Saturday 25 November 1922.

== Marriage ==
Sid Jerram's marriage to Edna G. (née Hughes) was registered during fourth ¼ 1915 in Swansea district.
