= Joe Corsi =

Wales international rugby league footballer

Personal information
- Full name: Joseph Corsi
- Born: 4 October 1894 Cardiff, Wales
- Died: 1959 (aged 64) Cardiff, Wales

Playing information
- Position: Wing
Club
Years	Team	Pld	T	G	FG	P
1913–23	Rochdale Hornets
1923–28	Oldham	150	107	0	0	321
	Total	150	107	0	0	321
Representative
Years	Team	Pld	T	G	FG	P
1923	Wales	1	0	0	0	0

Joseph Corsi (4 October 1894 – 1959) was a Welsh professional rugby league footballer who played in the 1920s. He played at representative level for Wales, and at club level for Rochdale Hornets and Oldham, as a wing.

== Background ==
Joe Corsi's birth was registered in Cardiff district, Wales, and his death aged 64 was registered in Cardiff district, Wales.

== Playing career ==
=== Rochdale Hornets ===
Corsi joined Rochdale Hornets in 1913. He made his first team debut in December 1919.

Corsi played on the wing in Rochdale Hornets' 10-9 victory over Hull F.C. in the 1922 Challenge Cup Final during the 1921–22 season at Headingley, Leeds on Saturday 6 May 1922, in front of a crowd of 32,596. and

=== Oldham ===
Corsi played on the wing in Oldham's 10–0 victory over St Helens Recs in the 1924 Lancashire Cup Final during the 1924–25 season at The Willows, Salford on Saturday 22 November 1924.

He played on the wing in Oldham's 4–21 defeat by Wigan in the 1924 Challenge Cup Final during the 1923–24 season at Athletic Grounds, Rochdale on Saturday 12 April 1924. He also appeared in the 16–3 victory over Hull Kingston Rovers in the 1925 Challenge Cup Final during the 1924–25 season at Headingley, Leeds, and the 3–9 defeat by Swinton in the 1926 Challenge Cup Final during the 1925–26 season at Athletic Grounds, Rochdale, but missed out on the 26–7 victory over Swinton in the 1927 Challenge Cup Final during the 1926–27 season at Central Park, Wigan.

=== International honours ===
Joe Corsi played on the wing in Wales' 11-18 defeat by England at Fartown Ground, Huddersfield on Thursday 1 November 1923.

== Personal life ==
Joe Corsi had four brothers (Angelo, Jack, Louis and Rigo) who all played rugby league for various club in the 1920s.
