= Jack Price (rugby league) =

Great Britain and England international rugby league footballer

Personal information
- Born: c. 1893
- Died: 7 February 1952 (aged 59)

Playing information
- Position: Second-row, Loose forward
Club
Years	Team	Pld	T	G	FG	P
≤1921–22	Broughton Rangers
1922–27	Wigan	176	71	0	0	213
	Total	176	71	0	0	213
Representative
Years	Team	Pld	T	G	FG	P
1921–24	England	3	0	0	0	0
1921–24	Great Britain	6	2	0	0	6

Jack Price (c. 1893 – 7 February 1952) was an English professional rugby league footballer who played in the 1920s. He played at representative level for Great Britain and England, and at club level for Broughton Rangers and Wigan, as a second-row or loose forward.

== Playing career ==
=== Championship final appearances ===
Price played loose forward, in Wigan's 22–10 victory over Warrington in the Championship Final during the 1925–26 season at Knowsley Road, St. Helens on Saturday 8 May 1926.

=== County League appearances ===
Price played in Wigan's victories in the Lancashire League during the 1922–23 season, 1923–24 season and 1925–26 season.

=== Challenge Cup Final appearances ===
Price played loose forward, and scored a try in Wigan's 21–4 victory over Oldham in the 1923–24 Challenge Cup Final during the 1923–24 season at Athletic Grounds, Rochdale on Saturday 12 April 1924.

=== County Cup Final appearances ===
Price played loose forward in Wigan's 11–15 defeat by Swinton in the 1925–26 Lancashire Cup Final during the 1925–26 season at The Cliff, Broughton on Wednesday 9 December 1925.

=== International honours ===
Price won caps for England while at Broughton Rangers in 1921 against Australia, while at Wigan in 1922 against Wales, in 1924 against Other Nationalities, and won caps for Great Britain while at Broughton Rangers in 1921–22 against Australia (2 matches), and while at Wigan in 1924 against Australia (2 matches), and New Zealand (2 matches).
