= Ambrose Baker =

Wales dual-code international rugby footballer

Personal information
- Full name: Ambrose Baker
- Born: 7 July 1897 Swansea, Wales
- Died: 24 November 1976 (aged 79) Oldham, England

Playing information

Rugby union
- Position: Flanker
Club
Years	Team	Pld	T	G	FG	P
19??–23	Neath RFC
1923	Leicester	2	1	0	0	3
	Total	2	1	0	0	3
Representative
Years	Team	Pld	T	G	FG	P
1921–23	Wales	5	1	0	0	3

Rugby league
- Position: Forward
Club
Years	Team	Pld	T	G	FG	P
1924–31	Oldham	166	24	0	0	72
Representative
Years	Team	Pld	T	G	FG	P
1924	Other Nationalities	1	0	0	0	0
1925–28	Wales	2	0	0	0	0

Ambrose Baker (7 July 1897 – 24 November 1976) was a dual-code international rugby player who played rugby union for Neath and rugby league with Oldham, as a forward. He won five caps for Wales under the rugby union code and then represented his country at rugby league in two matches between 1925 and 1928, and Other Nationalities in 1924.

== Club Rugby career ==
=== Neath ===
Baker came to note as a rugby union player representing South Wales club Neath.

=== Leicester ===
In 1923 Baker played two games for Leicester.

=== Oldham ===
In early 1924, Baker turned his back on amateur rugby when he signed for professional rugby league team Oldham, making his début on 19 January 1924 against Barrow. While with Oldham, Baker won a cap for Other Nationalities in the 23–17 victory over England at Headingley, Leeds on 15 October 1924, and both his international appearances for the Wales rugby league team. His first match was on 7 February 1925 played against England at Workington. He had to wait almost three years for his second and final cap, again versus England, in January 1928.

==== Challenge Cup Final appearances ====
Ambrose Baker played as a forward in Oldham's 4–21 defeat by Wigan in the 1924 Challenge Cup Final during the 1923–24 season at Athletic Grounds, Rochdale on Saturday 12 April 1924. During Ambrose Baker's time, there was Oldham's 16–3 victory over Hull Kingston Rovers in the 1925 Challenge Cup Final during the 1924–25 season at Headingley, Leeds, the 3–9 defeat by Swinton in the 1926 Challenge Cup Final during the 1925–26 season at Athletic Grounds, Rochdale, and the 26–7 victory over Swinton in the 1927 Challenge Cup Final during the 1926–27 season at Central Park, Wigan.

== Internationals ==
=== Wales (rugby union) ===
It was with Neath that he was first selected to represent Wales, brought in for the encounter with Ireland in the last Welsh match of the 1921 Five Nations Championship. Although Wales won the game 6–0, Baker was not re-selected in 1922 Championship, but the following year he played in all four matches of the 1923 Championship. 1922 had seen Wales win the Five Nations title, but 1923 was dominated by England and Scotland. Wales narrowly lost the opener to England, and this was followed by an 11–8 loss at home to Scotland. On 24 February, Baker was part of a winning Wales team, as they beat France at Swansea. Although the game was marred by an overly violent French team, Baker managed to score his only international points, scoring one of three Welsh tries. His final rugby union international game was away to Ireland, Wales lost 5–4.

- England 1923
- France 1923
- Ireland 1921, 1923
- Scotland 1923

=== Wales (rugby league) ===
- England 1925, 1928

=== Other Nationalities (rugby league) ===
- England 1924
