= George Owens (rugby) =

Wales international rugby league footballer

George Owen
Personal information
- Full name: George Owen
- Born: 26 November 1894 Wales
- Died: December 1978 (aged 84)

Playing information

Rugby union
Club
Years	Team	Pld	T	G	FG	P
	Swansea RFC

Rugby league
- Position: Stand-off
Club
Years	Team	Pld	T	G	FG	P
1913–27	Wigan	221	55	8	0	181
1928–28	St Helens	7	2	0	0	6
	Total	228	57	8	0	187
Representative
Years	Team	Pld	T	G	FG	P
1923	Wales	1

George Owen (26 November 1894 – December 1978), also known by the nickname of 'Dodger', was a Welsh rugby union, and professional rugby league footballer who played in the 1910s and 1920s. He played club level rugby union (RU) for Swansea RFC, and representative level rugby league (RL) for Wales, and at club level for Wigan and later St Helens (January–March 1928), as a stand-off.

== Playing career ==
=== Change of code ===
Following a meeting with a Wigan rugby league club representative at the Bush Hotel, Swansea on Sunday 28 September 1913, Swansea RFC's rugby union half-back pairing of Sidney Jerram, and George Owen were each signed for £180 down payment (based on increases in average earnings, this would be approximately £61,630 in 2013), guaranteed win bonuses, and jobs for £2 per week cash.

=== International honours ===
George Owen won a cap for Wales (RL) while at Wigan in 1923.

=== Championship final appearances ===
George Owen played stand-off in Wigan's 22–10 victory over Warrington in the Championship Final during the 1925–26 season at Knowsley Road, St. Helens on Saturday 8 May 1926.

=== County League appearances ===
George Owen played in Wigan's victories in the Lancashire League during the 1913–14 season, 1914–15 season, 1920–21 season, 1922–23 season, 1923–24 season and 1925–26 season.

=== County Cup Final appearances ===
George Owen played stand-off in Wigan's 20–2 victory over Leigh in the 1922–23 Lancashire Cup Final during the 1922–23 season at The Willows, Salford on Saturday 25 November 1922, and played stand-off in the 11–15 defeat by Swinton in the 1925–26 Lancashire Cup Final during the 1925–26 season at The Cliff, Broughton on Wednesday 9 December 1925.

=== Notable tour matches ===
George Owen played stand-off, in Wigan's 36–15 victory over New Zealand in the tour match during the 1925–26 season at Central Park, Wigan on Saturday 11 December 1926.
