= 1923–24 Challenge Cup =

Rugby league competition

- Duration: 5 rounds
- Number of teams: 32
- Highest attendance: 41,831
- Winners: Wigan
- Runners-up: Oldham

The 1923–24 Challenge Cup was the 24th staging of rugby league's oldest knockout competition, the Challenge Cup.

The final was contested by Wigan and Oldham at the Athletic Grounds in Rochdale.

The final was played on Saturday 12 April 1924, where Wigan beat Oldham 21–4 in front of a crowd of 41,831.

== First round ==
Date	Team one	Score one	Team two	Score two
16 Feb	Batley	19	Wigan Highfield	7
16 Feb	Bradford Northern	3	Dewsbury	13
16 Feb	Broughton Rangers	34	Hull St Patrick's	0
16 Feb	Dearham	3	Barrow	67
16 Feb	Featherstone Rovers	3	Swinton	5
16 Feb	Halifax	22	Hull FC	0
16 Feb	Huddersfield	19	Widnes	5
16 Feb	Hull Kingston Rovers	24	Castleford	2
16 Feb	Leeds	40	Bramley	0
16 Feb	Oldham	5	Rochdale Hornets	0
16 Feb	St Helens Recs	0	Wakefield Trinity	2
16 Feb	Salford	6	Hunslet	8
16 Feb	Wardley	0	St Helens	73
16 Feb	Warrington	46	Dalton	3
16 Feb	Wigan	7	Leigh	5
16 Feb	York	7	Keighley	3

== Second round ==
Date	Team one	Score one	Team two	Score two
1 Mar	Barrow	17	Hull Kingston Rovers	9
1 Mar	Huddersfield	24	St Helens	13
1 Mar	Hunslet	13	Swinton	2
1 Mar	Leeds	0	Wakefield Trinity	6
1 Mar	Oldham	18	Dewsbury	0
1 Mar	Wigan	49	Broughton Rangers	0
1 Mar	York	5	Warrington	7
1 Mar	Halifax	9	Batley	3

== Quarterfinals ==
Date	Team one	Score one	Team two	Score two
15 Mar	Barrow	34	Warrington	7
15 Mar	Huddersfield	7	Halifax	5
15 Mar	Hunslet	8	Wigan	13
15 Mar	Oldham	24	Wakefield Trinity	10

== Semifinals ==
Date	Team one	Score one	Team two	Score two
29 Mar	Huddersfield	5	Oldham	9
29 Mar	Wigan	30	Barrow	5

== Final ==
12 April 1924

Wigan	21 – 4	Oldham
Try: Roffey, Van Heerden, Parker, Price, Ring; Goal: Sullivan (3)	Report	Goal: Knapman, Brough

Athletic Grounds, Rochdale
Attendance: 41,831
Referee: Rev Frank Chambers (Dewsbury)

FB	1	Jim Sullivan
RW	2	Johnny Ring
RC	3	Tommy Howley
LC	4	Tommy Parker
LW	5	Attie Van Heerden
SO	6	Sid Jerram
SH	7	Danny Hurcombe
PR	8	Bert Webster
HK	9	Harry Banks
PR	10	George Van Rooyen
SR	11	Fred Brown
SR	12	Fred Roffey
LF	13	Jack Price
Coach:
Tommy McCarthy

FB	1	Ernie Knapman
RW	2	Sid Rix
RC	3	Billy Hall
LC	4	Alan Woodward
LW	5	Joe Corsi
SO	6	George Hesketh
SH	7	Alf Bates
PR	8	Jack Collins
HK	9	Ambrose Baker
PR	10	Alf Tomkins
SR	11	Bob Sloman
SR	12	Albert Brough
LF	13	Herman Hilton
Coach:
Charles Marsden
