= Attie van Heerden =

South African sportsman (1898-1965)

Personal information
- Full name: Adriaan Jacobus van Heerden
- Born: 10 March 1898 Boshof, Orange Free State
- Died: 14 October 1965 (aged 67) Pretoria, Transvaal Province, South Africa

Playing information
- Weight: 13 st 3 lb (185 lb; 84 kg)

Rugby union
- Position: Wing
Club
Years	Team	Pld	T	G	FG	P
≥1916–≤20	Stellenbosch University
1919	Western Province
1920–23	Transvaal
	Total	0	0	0	0	0
Representative
Years	Team	Pld	T	G	FG	P
1921	South Africa	2	1	0	0	3

Rugby league
- Position: Wing
Club
Years	Team	Pld	T	G	FG	P
1923–27	Wigan	127	107	0		321
1927	Leigh	14
	Total	141	107	0	0	321
Representative
Years	Team	Pld	T	G	FG	P
1923–27	Other Nationalities	≤2	2	0	0	6
- Source: As of 23 May 2012

Adriaan "Attie" Jacobus van Heerden (10 March 1898 – 14 October 1965) was a South African Olympian 400-metre hurdler, rugby union and professional rugby league footballer who played in the 1920s. He played representative level rugby union (RU) for South Africa (Springboks), at provincial level for Western Province and Transvaal, and at university level for Stellenbosch University, as a Wing, and representative level rugby league (RL) for Other Nationalities, and at club level for Wigan and Leigh, as a wing. Attie van Heerden played for Wigan in the same era as fellow South African Afrikaner David Booysen.

== Olympic appearance ==
Born 10 March 1898 in Boshof, Free State, Attie van Heerden participated in the 400-metre hurdles in the 1920 Summer Olympics in Antwerp, Belgium. He was eliminated at Round One, Heat Two as he did not finish. Attie van Heerden's personal best for the 400-metre hurdles was 57.9 seconds set in 1920.

Attie van Heerden was crowned as the South African champion in the 120-yard hurdles (16.0 seconds), as well as in the 440-yard hurdles (58.2 seconds) at the South African Championships held in Johannesburg in 1920.

Attie van Heerden is the only rugby Springbok to have participated at the Olympic Games.

== Playing career ==
=== International honours ===
Attie van Heerden won caps for South Africa (RU) while at Transvaal in 1921 against New Zealand (2 matches), and won cap(s) for Other Nationalities (RL) while at Wigan in 1923–26 against England.

Attie van Heerden did not participate in the Currie Cup Tournament of 1920, held at Bloemfontein and Kimberley, due to his participation at the 1920 Olympic Games in Antwerp, Belgium. However, he was still selected for the Springbok rugby team for the 1921 tour to Australia and New Zealand.

Attie van Heerden scored the first ever try in a South Africa versus New Zealand international rugby union match. He scored five tries in the first official match of the 1921 tour, against New South Wales, this was a Springbok record until 1956, when it was improved by Roy Dryburgh, who scored six tries. Attie van Heerden scored 42 points, from 14 tries, and was the top try scorer on the 1921 South Africa rugby union tour of Australia and New Zealand.

=== Championship final appearances ===
Attie van Heerden played in Wigan's 22–10 defeat by Batley in the Championship Final during the 1923–24 season, and scored a try in the 22–10 victory over Warrington in the Championship Final during the 1925–26 season at Knowsley Road, St. Helens on Saturday 8 May 1926.

=== Challenge Cup Final appearances ===
Attie van Heerden played wing, and scored a try in Wigan's 21–4 victory over Oldham in the 1923–24 Challenge Cup Final during the 1923–24 season at Athletic Grounds, Rochdale on Saturday 12 April 1924.

Attie van Heerden's try was scored between the posts behind a police horse that was on the field of play attempting to keep the 41,831 crowd at bay.

=== County League appearances ===
Attie van Heerden played in Wigan's victory in the Lancashire League during the 1925–26 season.

=== County Cup Final appearances ===
Attie van Heerden played on the wing in Wigan's 11–15 defeat by Swinton in the 1925–26 Lancashire Cup Final during the 1925–26 season at The Cliff, Broughton on Wednesday 9 December 1925.

== School days ==
Attie van Heerden was a pupil at Paarl Gimnasium school in Paarl, Western Cape Province, South Africa.

== Genealogical Information ==
Attie van Heerden was the brother of the wing of the 1920s for Wigan and York; Nicolaas Van Heerden. Van Heerden died 14 October 1965 in Pretoria, Gauteng.

== After Rugby ==
Following his retirement from rugby, Attie van Heerden returned to South Africa, and worked as a security guard for Iscor.
