= Fred Brown (rugby league, Wales) =

Wales international rugby league footballer

Personal information
- Full name: Fred Brown
- Born: unknown Pontypool, Wales
- Died: unknown

Playing information
- Position: Prop, Second-row
Club
Years	Team	Pld	T	G	FG	P
1921–23	Oldham	78	11	0	0	33
1923–25	Wigan	62	8	0	0	24
	Total	140	19	0	0	57
Representative
Years	Team	Pld	T	G	FG	P
1921–23	Wales	2	1	0	0	3
1924	Other Nationalities	1	0	0	0	0

Frederick "Fred" Brown (birth unknown – death unknown) was a Welsh professional rugby league footballer who played in the 1920s. He played at representative level for Wales, and at club level for Oldham and Wigan, as a prop, or second-row.

== Playing career ==
=== Oldham ===
Brown joined Oldham from Welsh rugby union club Pontypool RFC in 1921.

Brown played at prop in Oldham's 2–13 defeat by Wigan in the Championship Final during the 1921–22 season at The Cliff, Broughton on Saturday 6 May 1922.

=== Wigan ===
Brown played in Wigan's victory in the Lancashire League during the 1923–24.

Brown played at second-row in Wigan's 21–4 victory over Oldham in the 1924 Challenge Cup Final during the 1923–24 season at Athletic Grounds, Rochdale on Saturday 12 April 1924.

He joined Halifax in 1926.

=== International honours ===
Brown won two caps for Wales while at Oldham between 1921 and 1923.
