= Thomas Woods (rugby) =

England RU & Wales RL international rugby footballer

Personal information
- Full name: Thomas Woods
- Born: 30 January 1890 Pontypool, Wales
- Died: Unknown

Playing information

Rugby union
- Position: Forward
Club
| Years | Team | Pld | T | G | FG | P |
|---|---|---|---|---|---|---|
| | Pontypool RFC |
| | Devonport Services R.F.C. |
| | Devonport Albion R.F.C. |
| | Royal Navy Rugby Union |
| | Total | 0 | 0 | 0 | 0 | 0 |
Representative
| Years | Team | Pld | T | G | FG | P |
| 1920–21 | England | 5 |

Rugby league
- Position: Prop, Second-row
Club
| Years | Team | Pld | T | G | FG | P |
|---|---|---|---|---|---|---|
| 1921–24 | Wigan | 84 | 14 | | | 42 |
Representative
| Years | Team | Pld | T | G | FG | P |
| 1921–23 | Wales | 4 | 1 | 0 | 0 | 3 |

Thomas Woods (30 January 1890 – ?) was a Welsh-born dual-code international rugby union and rugby league footballer who played in the 1910s and 1920s. Woods was the first man to play international rugby union (RU) for England, and international rugby league (RL) for Wales.

In rugby union he played for Pontypool RFC, Devonport Services R.F.C. (and/or Devonport Albion R.F.C.), and the Royal Navy as a forward, and in rugby league he played at club level for Wigan, as a prop, hooker, or second-row.

== Playing career ==
=== Wigan ===
Woods was signed by rugby league club Wigan in July 1921, along with Pontypool RFC team mate Wilfred Hodder.

Woods played loose forward in Wigan's 13–2 victory over Oldham in the Championship Final during the 1921–22 season at The Cliff, Broughton on Saturday 6 May 1922.

Woods played hooker in Wigan's 20–2 victory over Leigh in the 1922–23 Lancashire Cup Final during the 1922–23 season at The Willows, Salford on Saturday 25 November 1922.

=== International honours ===
Thomas Woods won 5 caps for England (RU) in 1920–1921, and won 4 caps for Wales (RL) in 1921–1923 while at Wigan.
