= Tommy Howley =

England & Wales international rugby league footballer

Personal information
- Full name: Thomas Howley
- Born: 1895 Tredegar, Wales
- Died: 21 July 1974 (aged 78–79)

Playing information

Rugby union
Club
Years	Team	Pld	T	G	FG	P
	Ebbw Vale RFC

Rugby league
- Position: Wing, Centre
Club
Years	Team	Pld	T	G	FG	P
1920–26	Wigan	219	101	28	0	359
Representative
Years	Team	Pld	T	G	FG	P
1921–25	Wales	4	0	0	0	0
1924	Great Britain	6	2	0	0	6

Thomas Howley (1895 – 21 July 1974) was a Welsh rugby union, and professional rugby league footballer who played in the 1910s and 1920s. He played club level rugby union (RU) for Ebbw Vale RFC, and representative level rugby league (RL) for Great Britain and Wales, and at club level for Wigan, as a wing, or centre.

== Playing career ==
=== International honours ===
Thomas Howley won 4 caps for Wales (RL) in 1921–1925 while at Wigan, and won caps for Great Britain (RL) while at Wigan in 1924 against Australia (3 matches), and New Zealand (3 matches).

=== Championship final appearances ===
Thomas Howley played right-centre and scored a drop goal in Wigan's 13-2 victory over Oldham in the Championship Final during the 1921–22 season at The Cliff, Broughton on Saturday 6 May 1922, and played right-centre and scored a 2-tries in the 22-10 victory over Warrington in the Championship Final during the 1925–26 season at Knowsley Road, St. Helens on Saturday 8 May 1926.

=== County Cup Final appearances ===
Thomas Howley played left-centre and scored a try in Wigan's 20–2 victory over Leigh in the 1922–23 Lancashire Cup Final during the 1922–23 season at The Willows, Salford on Saturday 25 November 1922, and played right-centre in the 11-15 defeat by Swinton in the 1925–26 Lancashire Cup Final during the 1925–26 season at The Cliff, Broughton on Wednesday 9 December 1925
