= Fred Roffey =

Wales international rugby league footballer

- Godfrey Phillips Cigarette card featuring Fred Roffey

Personal information
- Full name: Frederick Leonard Roffey
- Born: 14 April 1895 Godstone, England
- Died: October 1988 (aged 93) Claro, England

Playing information

Rugby union
Club
Years	Team	Pld	T	G	FG	P
≤1920–20	Ebbw Vale RFC

Rugby league
- Position: Prop, Hooker, Second-row, Loose forward
Club
Years	Team	Pld	T	G	FG	P
1920–25	Wigan	158	20	1		62
1925–27	St. Helens	63	19			57
	Total	221	39	1	0	119
Representative
Years	Team	Pld	T	G	FG	P
1927	Monmouthshire	≥1
1921–26	Wales	2

Frederick "Fred" Leonard Roffey (born 14 April 1895 – October 1988) was an English rugby union and professional rugby league footballer who played in the 1910s and 1920s. He played club level rugby union (RU) for Ebbw Vale RFC, and representative level rugby league (RL) for Wales and Monmouthshire, and at club level for Wigan and St. Helens (captain), as a prop, hooker, second-row, or loose forward.

== Background ==
Frederick Roffey was born in Godstone, Surrey, England, and he died aged 93 in Claro, North Yorkshire, England.

== Playing career ==
=== International honours ===
Roffey won 2 caps for Wales in 1921–1926 while at Wigan and St. Helens.

=== County honours ===
Roffey played at second-row in Monmouthshire's 14-18 defeat by Glamorgan in the non-County Championship match during the 1926–27 season at Taff Vale Park, Pontypridd on Saturday 30 April 1927.

=== Championship final appearances ===
Roffey played at second-row in Wigan's 13-2 victory over Oldham in the Championship Final during the 1921–22 season at The Cliff, Broughton on Saturday 6 May 1922.

=== County Cup Final appearances ===
Roffey played loose forward in Wigan's 20-2 victory over Leigh in the 1922–23 Lancashire Cup Final during the 1922–23 season at The Willows, Salford on Saturday 25 November 1922, and played at second-row, and was captain in St. Helens' 10-2 victory over St Helens Recs in the 1926–27 Lancashire Cup Final during the 1926–27 season at Wilderspool Stadium, Warrington on Saturday 20 November 1926.

=== Club career ===
Roffey changed rugby football codes from rugby union to rugby league when he transferred from Ebbw Vale RFC to Wigan, he made his début for Wigan in the 18-5 victory over Rochdale Hornets at Central Park, Wigan on Saturday 25 September 1920, he scored his first try for Wigan in the 21-0 victory over Salford at The Willows, Salford on Saturday 20 November 1920, he scored his last try for Wigan in the 63-5 victory over Salford at The Willows, Salford on Saturday 17 January 1925, and he played his last match for Wigan in the 4-13 defeat by Hull Kingston Rovers in the Championship play-off semi-final match at Old Craven Park, Kingston upon Hull on Saturday 18 April 1925, and he transferred from Wigan to St. Helens.
