= 1925–26 Challenge Cup =

Rugby league competition

- Duration: 5 rounds
- Winners: Swinton
- Runners-up: Oldham

The 1925–26 Challenge Cup was the 26th staging of rugby league's oldest knockout competition, the Challenge Cup.

== First round ==
| Date | Team one | Score one | Team two | Score two |
|---|---|---|---|---|
| 13 Feb | Barnsley Utd | 0 | Hull Kingston Rovers | 28 |
| 13 Feb | Barrow | 44 | Barrow Cambridge St | 0 |
| 13 Feb | Bradford Northern | 2 | Keighley | 2 |
| 13 Feb | Bramley | 0 | Rochdale Hornets | 11 |
| 13 Feb | Castleford | 12 | St Helens Recs | 18 |
| 13 Feb | Featherstone Rovers | 7 | Broughton Rangers | 8 |
| 13 Feb | Halifax | 16 | Dewsbury | 0 |
| 13 Feb | Hensingham | 0 | Huddersfield | 33 |
| 13 Feb | Hull FC | 27 | Pemberton Rovers | 3 |
| 13 Feb | Hunslet | 7 | Warrington | 11 |
| 13 Feb | Leigh | 6 | Oldham | 18 |
| 13 Feb | Salford | 2 | Leeds | 3 |
| 13 Feb | Swinton | 19 | Batley | 9 |
| 13 Feb | Widnes | 7 | St Helens | 10 |
| 13 Feb | Wigan Highfield | 7 | Wakefield Trinity | 2 |
| 13 Feb | Wigan | 45 | York | 10 |
| 17 Feb | Keighley | 5 | Bradford Northern | 5 |
| 22 Feb | Bradford Northern | 9 | Keighley | 4 |

== Second round ==
| Date | Team one | Score one | Team two | Score two |
|---|---|---|---|---|
| 27 Feb | Barrow | 0 | Halifax | 3 |
| 27 Feb | Bradford Northern | 3 | Hull Kingston Rovers | 6 |
| 27 Feb | Leeds | 17 | Wigan | 10 |
| 27 Feb | Oldham | 12 | Rochdale Hornets | 3 |
| 27 Feb | St Helens | 7 | Hull FC | 10 |
| 27 Feb | Swinton | 8 | Broughton Rangers | 8 |
| 27 Feb | Warrington | 17 | St Helens Recs | 12 |
| 27 Feb | Wigan Highfield | 5 | Huddersfield | 3 |
| 03 Mar | Broughton Rangers | 3 | Swinton | 20 |

== Quarterfinals ==
| Date | Team one | Score one | Team two | Score two |
|---|---|---|---|---|
| 13 Mar | Hull FC | 15 | Warrington | 2 |
| 13 Mar | Oldham | 8 | Halifax | 5 |
| 13 Mar | Swinton | 24 | Hull Kingston Rovers | 3 |
| 13 Mar | Wigan Highfield | 11 | Leeds | 2 |

== Semifinals ==
| Date | Team one | Score one | Team two | Score two |
|---|---|---|---|---|
| 27 Mar | Oldham | 15 | Wigan Highfield | 6 |
| 27 Mar | Swinton | 13 | Hull FC | 2 |

== Final ==
Swinton beat Oldham 9-3 in the final played at Rochdale before a crowd of 27,000.

This was Swinton's second appearance in the final and their second Cup final win. Their previous victory was in 1900.

1 May 1926

| Swinton | 9 – 3 | Oldham |
|---|---|---|
| Tries: Blewer; Goals: Morris (3) | | Tries: Corsi |

Athletic Grounds, Rochdale
Attendance: 27,800
Referee: A. Brown (Wakefield)

| FB | 1 | Jack Pearson |
| RW | 2 | Frank Evans |
| RC | 3 | Wilf Sulway |
| LC | 4 | Jack Evans |
| LW | 5 | William Rees |
| SO | 6 | Chris Brockbank |
| SH | 7 | Bryn Evans |
| PR | 8 | Miller Strong |
| HK | 9 | Henry Blewer |
| PR | 10 | Herbert Morris |
| SR | 11 | Tom Halliwell |
| SR | 12 | Harry Entwistle |
| LF | 13 | Fred Beswick |
Coach:

| FB | 1 | Ernest Knapman |
| RW | 2 | Albert Brough |
| RC | 3 | Sid Rix |
| LC | 4 | Alf Higgs |
| LW | 5 | Joe Corsi |
| SO | 6 | Reg Jones |
| SH | 7 | George Hesketh |
| PR | 8 | Rothwell Marlor |
| HK | 9 | Bert Lister |
| PR | 10 | Jack Read |
| SR | 11 | Percy Carter |
| SR | 12 | Bob Sloman |
| LF | 13 | Ambrose Baker |
Coach:
