= Jack Read (rugby) =

English rugby union and rugby league player

Personal information
- Born: c. 1903 Gloucester, Gloucestershire, England
- Died: June 1989 (aged 86) Oldham, England

Playing information

Rugby union
Representative
Years	Team	Pld	T	G	FG	P
≤1925	Gloucestershire

Rugby league
- Position: Prop
Club
Years	Team	Pld	T	G	FG	P
1925–39/40	Oldham	463	16	1		50
Representative
Years	Team	Pld	T	G	FG	P
1936	Rugby League XIII

Jack Read (c. 1903 – June 1989) was an English rugby union and professional rugby league footballer who played in the 1920s, 1930s and 1940s. He played representative level rugby union (RU) for Gloucestershire, and representative level rugby league (RL) for Rugby League XIII, and at club level for Oldham, as a prop.

== Playing career ==
=== Challenge Final appearances ===
Jack Read played in Oldham's 3–9 defeat by Swinton in the 1926 Challenge Cup Final during the 1925-26 season at Spotland Stadium, Rochdale, and played in the 26–7 victory over Swinton in the 1927 Challenge Cup Final during the 1926-27 season at Central Park, Wigan.

=== Club career ===
Jack Read made his début for Oldham against Hull FC on Friday 1 January 1926.

=== Career records ===
Jack Read is second on Oldham's all-time appearance list with 463 appearances; he is second to Joe Ferguson who has 627 appearances.

== Honoured at Oldham ==
Jack Read is an Oldham Hall Of Fame Inductee.
