= 1939 Rochdale Athletic Grounds collapse =

Rochdale Athletic Grounds collapse, 1939
- The collapse of the stand roof captured by a Rochdale Observer photographer
- Date: 1 April 1939
- Time: Between 15:30 and 15:45
- Location: Athletic Grounds, Rochdale, Lancashire, England; 53°36′46″N 2°08′07″W
- Cause: roof collapse
- Deaths: 2
- Injuries: 17
- Inquest: 18 April 1939
- Coroner: Stanley Turner

The Rochdale Athletic Grounds collapse occurred on 1 April 1939 at the Athletic Grounds, Rochdale during a rugby league Challenge Cup semi-final between Salford and Wigan. Two people died and a further 17 were injured when part of the roof of the Railway Stand collapsed.

== Background ==
The draw for the semi-finals of the 1938–39 Challenge Cup produced an all-Yorkshire tie between Halifax and Leeds which as played at Odsal Stadium, Bradford, and an all-Lancashire tie between Wigan and Salford which the Rugby Football League (RFL) agreed would be played at Rochdale Hornets' ground, the Athletic Grounds.

Demand for tickets was high and sold well even with two weeks left before the game was played. In anticipation of a big attendance, additional safety barriers and entrance booths were installed.

== Incident ==
Despite the preparations made in readiness for the tie, the crowds were bigger than anticipated and the gate staff could not cope with the numbers seeking admission, with long queues forming to get into the ground. Some, grew impatient and forced the gates open, while others tore down fences. It was estimated that several thousand people gained admission this way, making the packed ground even fuller. The greyhound track, surrounding the pitch was full with people who had climbed over the barriers to avoid the crush from people coming in behind them. Others climbed onto the roofs of the stands and remained there even though the police made several requests for them to come down.

Before kick-off the referee, S Adams, had to ask the spectators to step back so that the touch judges could see the touch lines of the pitch. The start of the match was delayed by five minutes due to this.

Five minutes into play, loud cracking was heard and a section about 30 yards (27.4 m) long of the Railway Stand roof about collapsed, falling onto the packed terrace underneath as well as spilling the people on the roof onto the crowds below. The game was suspended while police, ambulance staff, spectators and players all helped to remove the people trapped under the debris. Within seven minutes all the injured had been moved to an area behind the main stand from where 17 people were taken to hospital. Two of these later died. 41-year old Joseph Howles died later in the day, while 51-year old Annie West died the following day.

After discussions between the match officials, the clubs and the RFL, it was decided to continue the game. Salford went on to win 11–2.

The official attendance was recorded as 31,212 but estimates were that another 5,000 had entered the ground.

== Aftermath ==
An inquest into the two deaths commenced on 4 April 1939 and was adjourned after formal identification of the deceased. The coroner, Stanley Turner (who was at the match when the accident happened), visited the ground before the inquest resumed on 18 April. Sections of the roof timbers were produced at the inquest and although the timbers were found to be rotten but that the roof would not have collapsed without the weight of people on the roof. The inquest heard that Annie West was not in the stand which collapsed but was in the ground and saw the collapse and became ill as a result. A verdict of death by natural causes was returned in the case of Annie West. Joseph Howles had been in the stand when the roof collapsed and he had been rescued from under the fallen section. A verdict of accidental death was recorded.

Although the Athletic Grounds continued to be home to Rochdale Hornets until 1988, the Salford-Wigan game was the last major match staged at the ground where previously internationals, county championship matches and the final of the 1923–24 Challenge Cup had been played.
