= George van Rooyen =

South Africa international rugby union & league footballer

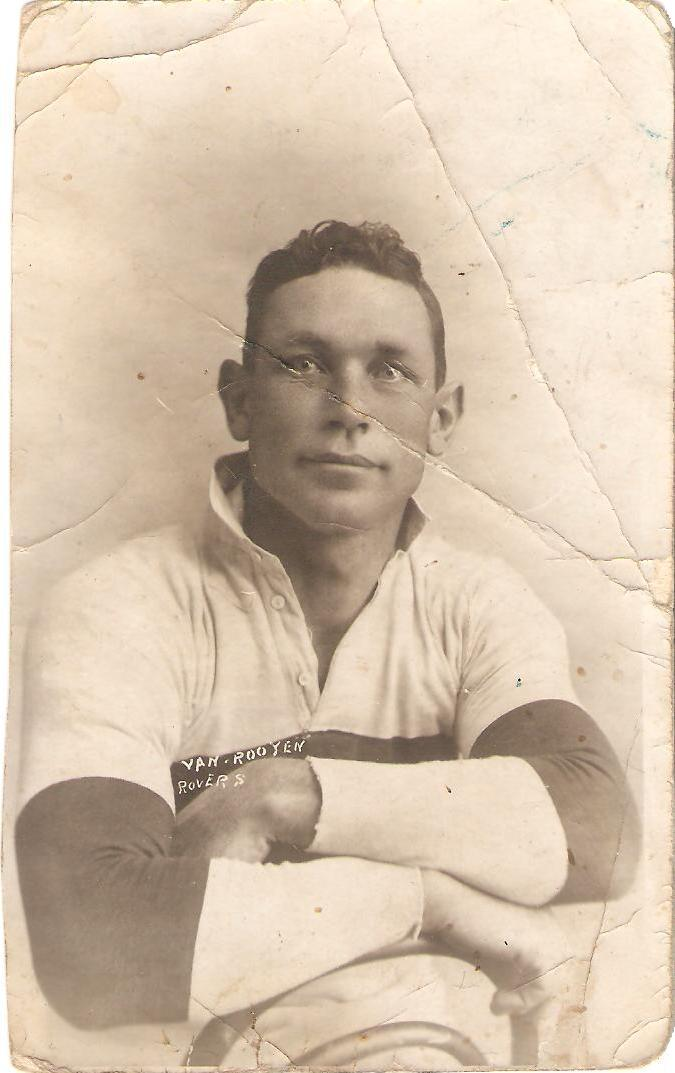
- Van Rooyen when he was playing for Rovers.

Personal information
- Full name: Gert Wilhelm van Rooyen
- Born: 9 December 1892; Steynsburg, Cape Colony (now Eastern Cape, South Africa)
- Died: 21 September 1942 (aged 49); Runcorn, England

Playing information
- Height: 1.87 m (6 ft 2 in)
- Weight: 99.8 kg (15 st 10 lb)

Rugby union
- Position: Lock
Representative
Years	Team	Pld	T	G	FG	P
1921	South Africa	2	0	0		0

Rugby league
- Position: Second-row
Club
Years	Team	Pld	T	G	FG	P
1922–23	Hull Kingston Rovers	35	7	0	0	21
1923–29	Wigan	178	26	0		78
1929–33	Widnes	74	4	0		12
	Total	287	37	0	0	111
Representative
Years	Team	Pld	T	G	FG	P
1924	Other Nationalities	1

Gert Wilhelm "Tank" van Rooyen (9 December 1892 – 21 September 1942), also known as George van Rooyen, was a South African international rugby union and rugby league footballer. His position was at lock.

== Club career ==
At the age of 29, Van Rooyen moved to England in 1922 to play rugby league for Hull Kingston Rovers, where he won the 1922–23 league championship. He joined Wigan in November 1923, and went on to win the Challenge Cup in 1924, and two Lancashire League titles in 1923–24 and 1925–26.

Tank van Rooyen played at second-row in Wigan's 22–10 victory over Warrington in the Championship Final during the 1925–26 season at Knowsley Road, St. Helens on Saturday, 8 May 1926.

Tank van Rooyen played at second-row in Wigan's 11–15 defeat by Swinton in the 1925–26 Lancashire Cup Final during the 1925–26 season at The Cliff, Broughton on Wednesday, 9 December 1925. He spent six years at Wigan, making a total 178 appearances for the club.

In 1929, he joined Widnes on a free transfer, and became the club's first ever overseas player. In 1930, he won his second Challenge Cup in a shock 10–3 victory over St. Helens. He continued to play for Widnes until his retirement in 1933.

== Representative career ==
In rugby union, Van Rooyen appeared for South Africa in two Tests in 1921. As a professional rugby league footballer, his only appearance at representative level was for Other Nationalities, playing in the team that beat England 23–17 at Headingley in 1924.
