= Reginald Jones (rugby league) =

English rugby league footballer

Reg Jones
Personal information
- Full name: Reginald Jones

Playing information
- Position: Scrum-half
Club
Years	Team	Pld	T	G	FG	P
1920–31	Oldham	72	10	0	0	30

Reginald Jones was a professional rugby league footballer who played in the 1920s and 1930s. He played at club level for Oldham, as a scrum-half.

== Challenge Cup Final appearances ==
Reginald Jones played scrum-half, in Oldham's 26-7 victory over Swinton in the 1926–27 Challenge Cup Final during the 1926–27 season at Central Park, Wigan on Saturday 7 May 1927, in front of a crowd of 33,448.
