= David Booysen (rugby league) =

South African rugby league footballer

Personal information
- Full name: David Booysen
- Born: South Africa

Playing information
- Position: Centre, Scrum-half
Club
Years	Team	Pld	T	G	FG	P
1924–29	Wigan	156	52	2		160
Representative
Years	Team	Pld	T	G	FG	P
	Other Nationalities	≥1	1	0	0	3

David Booysen was a South African Afrikaner professional rugby league footballer who played in the 1920s. He played at representative level for Other Nationalities, and at club level for Wigan, as a centre, or scrum-half. David Booysen played for Wigan in the same era as fellow South African Afrikaner Attie van Heerden.

== Playing career ==
=== International honours ===
David Booysen won cap(s) for Other Nationalities while at Wigan against England.

=== Championship final appearances ===
David Booysen played scrum-half in Wigan's 22-10 victory over Warrington in the Championship Final during the 1925–26 season at Knowsley Road, St. Helens on Saturday 8 May 1926.

=== County League appearances ===
David Booysen played in Wigan's victory in the Lancashire League during the 1925–26 season.

=== County Cup Final appearances ===
David Booysen played at centre in Wigan's 11-15 defeat by Swinton in the 1925–26 Lancashire Cup Final during the 1925–26 season at The Cliff, Broughton on Wednesday 9 December 1925.
