= 1924–25 Lancashire Cup =

- Structure: Regional knockout competition
- Teams: 13
- Winners: Oldham
- Runners-up: St Helens Recs

The 1924–25 Lancashire Cup competition was the seventeenth in the history of this regional rugby league competition and the cup was won by Oldham who beat the holders and last year's winners St Helens Recs in the final at The Willows, Salford, by a score of 10–0. The attendance at the final was 15,000 and receipts £1,116.

== Background ==
The number of teams entering the competition remained at 13 which resulted in 3 byes in the first round.

== Competition and results ==
=== Round 1 ===
Involved 5 matches (with three byes) and 13 clubs

Game No	Fixture date	Home team	Score	Away team	Venue	Att	Rec	Notes	Ref
1	Sat 11 October 1924	Leigh	0–8	Warrington	Mather Lane				
2	Sat 11 October 1924	St Helens Recs	17–2	Wigan	City Road				
3	Sat 11 October 1924	Rochdale Hornets	8–0	Swinton	Athletic Grounds				
4	Sat 11 October 1924	Salford	5–3	Wigan Highfield	The Willows				
5	Sat 11 October 1924	Widnes	7–7	St. Helens	Lowerhouse Lane				
6		Barrow		bye					
7		Broughton Rangers		bye					
8		Oldham		bye					
Replay
9	Wed 15 October 1924	St. Helens	19–5	Widnes	Knowsley Road				

=== Round 2 – quarterfinals ===
Game No	Fixture date	Home team	Score	Away team	Venue	Att	Rec	Notes	Ref
1	Sat 25 October 1924	Barrow	11–2	Broughton Rangers	Little Park, Roose				
2	Sat 25 October 1924	Oldham	11–5	Rochdale Hornets	Watersheddings				
3	Sat 25 October 1924	St Helens Recs	36–5	Salford	City Road				
4	Sat 25 October 1924	St. Helens	15–5	Warrington	Knowsley Road				

=== Round 3 – semifinals ===
Game No	Fixture date	Home team	Score	Away team	Venue	Att	Rec	Notes	Ref
1	Sat 8 November 1924	Barrow	5–7	St Helens Recs	Little Park, Roose				
2	Sat 8 November 1924	St. Helens	9–16	Oldham	Knowsley Road				

=== Final ===
Game No	Fixture date	Home team	Score	Away team	Venue	Att	Rec	Notes	Ref
	Saturday 22 November 1924	Oldham	10–0	St Helens Recs	The Willows	15000	£1,116	1	

==== Teams and scorers ====
Oldham	№	St Helens Recs
	teams	
Ernie Knapman	1	
	2	
Evan Davies	3	
Sid Rix	4	
Joe Corsi	5	
	6	
	7	
Herman Hilton	8	
	9	
Bob Sloman	10	Henry 'Harry' Grundy
Rothwell Marlor	11	Frank Bowen
Albert Brough	12	
George Hesketh	13	
10	score	0
5	HT	0
	Scorers	
	Tries	
	T	
	T	
	Goals	
	G	
	G	
	Drop Goals	
	DG	
Referee		

Scoring – Try = three (3) points – Goal = two (2) points – Drop goal = two (2) points

=== The road to success ===
First round
Widnes	7(5)
St. Helens	7(19)
Leigh	0
Warrington	8
Oldham
bye
Rochdale Hornets	8
Swinton	0
Barrow
bye
Broughton Rangers
bye
St Helens Recs	17
Wigan	2
Salford	5
Wigan Highfield	3

Second round
St. Helens	15
Warrington	5
Oldham	11
Rochdale Hornets	5
Barrow	11
Broughton Rangers	2
St Helens Recs	36
Salford	5

Semifinals
St. Helens	9
Oldham	16
Barrow	5
St Helens Recs	7

Final
Oldham	10
St Helens Recs	0

== See also ==
- 1924–25 Northern Rugby Football League season

== Notes ==
- 1 The Willows was the home ground of Salford.
