= 1922–23 Lancashire Cup =

- Structure: Regional knockout competition
- Teams: 13
- Winners: Wigan
- Runners-up: Leigh

The 1922–23 Lancashire Cup was the fifteenth staging of this regional rugby league competition. The trophy was won again by Wigan who beat local rivals Leigh in the final at The Willows, Salford, by a score of 20–2. The attendance at the final was 15,000 and receipts £1,200 (based on increases in average earnings, this would be approximately £232,200 in 2018).

== Background ==
The number of teams entering this year's competition was reduced by one to 13. Wigan Highfield continued to participate, but now as full league members after joining the league. Askam who had played in the previous two tournaments were not invited to take part this year and no other junior/amateur club was invited to take part. With 13 teams, 3 teams were given byes in the first round.

== Competition and results ==
=== Round 1 ===
Involved 5 matches (with three byes) and 13 clubs

Game No	Fixture date	Home team	Score	Away team	Venue	Att	Rec	Notes	Ref
1	Sat 14 October 1922	Barrow	5–14	Swinton	Little Park, Roose				
2	Sat 14 October 1922	Rochdale Hornets	2–5	Wigan	Athletic Grounds				
3	Sat 14 October 1922	St. Helens	25–8	Salford	Knowsley Road				
4	Sat 14 October 1922	Warrington	8–5	Broughton Rangers	Wilderspool				
5	Sat 14 October 1922	Wigan Highfield	0–0	Oldham	Tunstall Lane			1	
6		St Helens Recs		bye					
7		Leigh		bye					
8		Widnes		bye					
Replay
9	Mon 16 October 1922	Oldham	20–5	Wigan Highfield	Watersheddings				

=== Round 2 – quarterfinals ===
Game No	Fixture date	Home team	Score	Away team	Venue	Att	Rec	Notes	Ref
1	Sat 28 October 1922	Leigh	13–8	Oldham	Mather Lane				
2	Sat 28 October 1922	St. Helens	4–17	Warrington	Knowsley Road				
3	Sat 28 October 1922	Widnes	7–0	Swinton	Lowerhouse Lane				
4	Sat 28 October 1922	Wigan	14–3	St Helens Recs	Central Park				

=== Round 3 – semifinals ===
Game No	Fixture date	Home team	Score	Away team	Venue	Att	Rec	Notes	Ref
1	Sat 11 November 1922	Leigh	5–2	Widnes	Mather Lane				
2	Sat 11 November 1922	Warrington	2–8	Wigan	Wilderspool				

=== Final ===
Game No	Fixture date	Home team	Score	Away team	Venue	Att	Rec	Notes	Ref
	Saturday 25 November 1922	Wigan	20–2	Leigh	The Willows	15000	£1,200–0–0	2	

==== Teams and scorers ====
Wigan	No.	Leigh
	Teams	
Jim Sullivan	1	Tommy Clarkson
Danny Hurcombe	2	Abe Johnson
Jerry Shea	3	Wyndham Emery
Tommy Howley	4	Emlyn Thomas
Johnny Ring	5	Reg Taylor
George Owens	6	Bert Ganley
Syd Jerram	7	Walter Mooney (c)
Wilf Hodder	8	Jim Winstanley
Tom Woods	9	Joe Cartwright
Bert Webster	10	Albert Worrall
Percy Coldrick	11	Dai Davies
Harry Banks	12	Jack Armstrong
Fred Roffey	13	Ernie Boardman
20	score	2
13	HT	2
	Scorers	
	Tries	
Bert Webster (2)	T	
Tommy Howley] (1)	T	
Johnny Ring (1)	T	
	Goals	
Jim Sullivan(4)	G	Walter Mooney (1)
Referee		

Scoring – Try = three (3) points – Goal = two (2) points – Drop goal = two (2) points

=== The road to success ===
First round
St. Helens	25
Salford	8
Warrington	8
Broughton Rangers	5
Rochdale Hornets	2
Wigan	5
St Helens Recs
bye
Leigh
bye
Wigan Highfield	0(5)
Oldham	0(20)
Widnes
bye
Barrow	5
Swinton	14

Second round
St. Helens	4
Warrington	17
Wigan	14
St Helens Recs	3
Leigh	13
Oldham	8
Widnes	7
Swinton	0

Semifinals
Warrington	2
Wigan	8
Leigh	5
Widnes	2

Final
Wigan	20
Leigh	2

== See also ==
- 1922–23 Northern Rugby Football League season

== Notes ==
- 1 This was also the first game in the competition to be played at Tunstall Lane
- 2 The Willows was the home ground of Salford w
