= David Booysen =

David Booysen may refer to:

- David Booysen (rugby league), South African rugby league player
- David Booysen (soccer) (born 1989), South African footballer
