= Church of the Ascension, Lower Broughton =

Historic site in Salford, England

Church of the Ascension
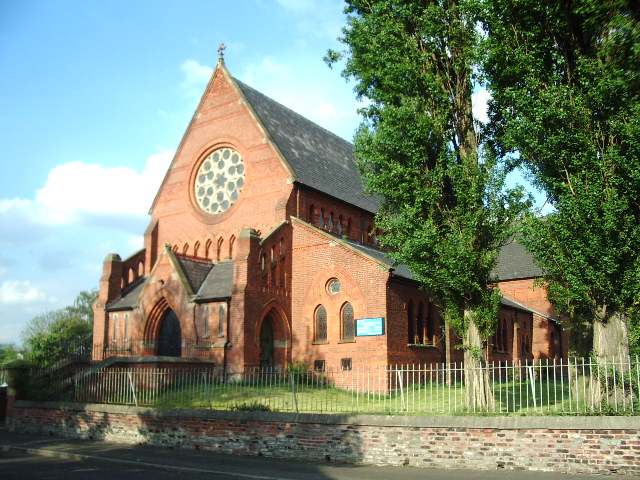
- The Church of the Ascension in 2007

- The church's location in Greater Manchester
- 53°29′41″N 2°15′46″W
- Location: Lower Broughton
- OS grid reference: SJ8265799812

Listed Building
- Official name: Church of the Ascension
- Type: Grade II
- Designated: 20 October 1998
- Reference no.: 1386122

The Church of the Ascension is a Grade II listed Anglican church in Lower Broughton, Salford, England. In February 2017 a fire destroyed the roof and interior of the building.

== Location ==
The church is located on Ascension Road in Lower Broughton, in the United Kingdom, at grid reference SJ89NW and National Grid reference SJ 82657 99812. It is next to Green Grosvenor Park and River View Primary School.

== Architecture ==
=== Exterior ===
The brick building has a roof made of Welsh slate. It is constructed in an Early English style with "robust, muscular detail". The narthex to the west has an arched doorway on each side, with a gabled porch, and a large rose window. The aisles are divided into four bays. The eastern apse had ornate brickwork, and the building had Victorian-era stained glass. The building was a rare example of the work of Medland Taylor.

=== Interior ===
The nave has two aisles. The chancel has chapels in the transept. The east end of the church has an apse that is a little higher than the nave.

== History ==
=== Early history ===
The church was built in 1869. It was used as an Anglican church, and contained memorials from World War I and World War II.

=== Restoration ===
It was Grade II listed on 20 October 1998. In September 2013 grants totalling £250,000 from English Heritage and the National Lottery, were awarded to restore both the inside and outside of the building, and to replace the roof. The church was used for worship.

=== 2017 fire ===
On 12 February 2017 the church caught fire, and the fire brigade was called at 11:08 pm. The fire took dozens of firefighters with six fire engines to extinguish. The fire melted gas pipes inside the building, with the subsequent gas ignition causing additional damage to the building. Most of the fire was extinguished in an hour, although firefighters stayed at the site overnight. The roof of the building collapsed during the fire, and the interior was destroyed. The top parts of the gable ends of the building were dismantled to make the building safe.

A fundraising campaign to restore the church was launched after the fire, with the hope that the building can be saved. Canon David Wyatt of the Church of the Ascension, described the fire as hurtful and frustrating but noted the “heart-warming” response from parishioners. Greater Manchester Police investigated the fire. CCTV footage of suspects was released to the public. A 22-year-old man was arrested on suspicion of arson on 17 February, although the origin of the fire remains unknown.

A project to rebuild the church over two years was announced in June 2017. The Church reopened in October 2022, with the licensing of Rev Canon Falak Sher, with over 200 people in the congregation.

The New Pipe Organ.

The previous organ, a 2 manual tracker Jardine's instrument, was destroyed in the fire.

The New instrument was installed by the Nottingham based firm, Henry Groves & Sons. It is a 3 manual electro-magnetic organ which boasts 53 speaking stops over 3 manuals and pedal board. It is a far superior instrument, the first Henry Groves instrument in Manchester, and the North West.
