= Johnny Ring =

Great Britain and Wales dual-code international rugby footballer

Personal information
- Born: 13 November 1900; Port Talbot, Wales
- Died: 10 November 1984 (aged 83); Wigan, England

Playing information

Rugby union
- Position: Wing
Club
Years	Team	Pld	T	G	FG	P
–1918	Aberavon Quins RFC
1918–22	Aberavon RFC
	Total	0	0	0	0	0
Representative
Years	Team	Pld	T	G	FG	P
1921	Wales	1	1	0	0	3

Rugby league
- Position: Wing
Club
Years	Team	Pld	T	G	FG	P
1922–31	Wigan	331	368	4	0	1112
1932–34	Rochdale Hornets	26	12	0	0	36
	Total	357	380	4	0	1148
Representative
Years	Team	Pld	T	G	FG	P
1925–30	Wales	7	5	0	0	15
1924–26	Great Britain	2	0	0	0	0
1926	Other Nationalities	1	0	0	0	0

John Ring (13 November 1900 – 10 November 1984) was a Welsh dual-code international rugby union, and professional rugby league footballer who played in the 1910s, 1920s and 1930s. He played representative level rugby union (RU) for Wales, and at club level for Aberavon Quins RFC and Aberavon RFC, as a wing, and representative level rugby league (RL) for England and Wales, and at club level for Wigan and Rochdale Hornets, as a wing.

== Playing career ==
Rugby Union Career (Mainly from "The History of the Aberavon Wizards")

He played for Aberavon for 3 years (Seasons 1919-20, 1920-21 & 1921-22) during the course of which he scored a Club record 125 Tries, including 7 (or possibly 8) in one game.

He made a single appearance for Wales in 1922 versus England where he scored the only try of the game in a losing Welsh team.

He signed for Wigan in August 1922 upon which, in accordance with the laws on Amateurism in Welsh Rugby at that point in time, his name was removed from the Aberavon Honours board although these were reinstated at a later date as Rugby Union became professional.

Among the Records he set for Aberavon were:

- All Time Leading Try Scorer - 125 tries (subsequently overtaken in the professional era
- Tries in a season - 55 tries (again eventually overtaken in the professional era)
- Tries in a game - 7 Tries in a match (although some state there was a match in which he scored 8 but there are no records to confirm this (This has only been equalled in the professional era

"There'e Ring, Dai Hunt Davies, Bob Randall and Mears,

Tom Ponsford, Jim Jones and Old Dan (Tobin),

They pass and repass the old leather together,

Each knows how to tackle his man,

'Bravon, 'Bravon, you're going to beat Swansea* today.

It takes a good Wing to beat Johnny Ring, and the Full Back you can't beat at all"

Aberavon match day song

*or whoever Aberavon were playing that day.

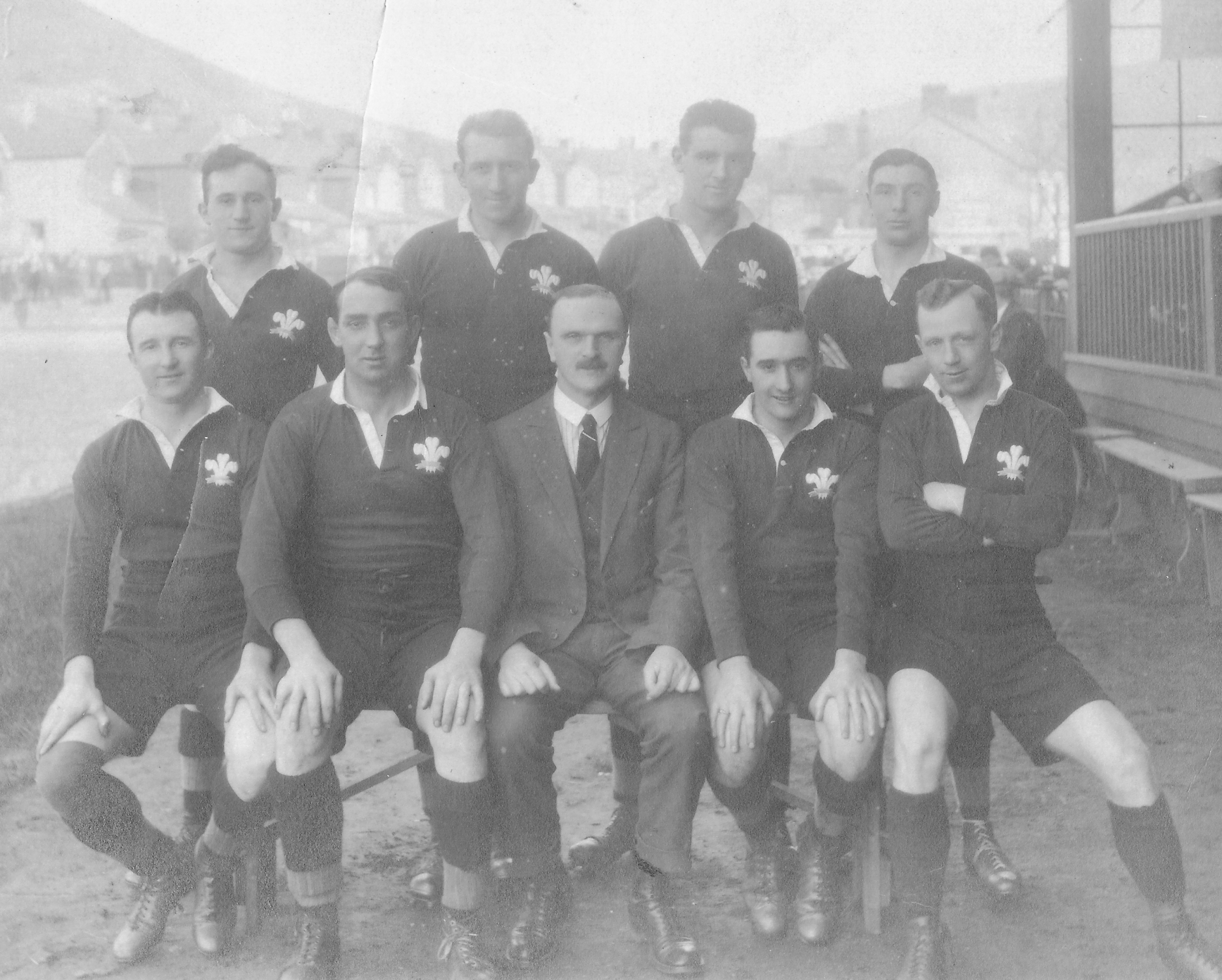

=== International honours ===
Johnny Ring won a cap for Wales (RU) while at Aberavon in 1921 against England, won 6 caps for Wales (RL) in 1925–1930 while at Wigan, and won caps for Great Britain (RL) while at Wigan in 1924 against Australia, and in 1926 against New Zealand.

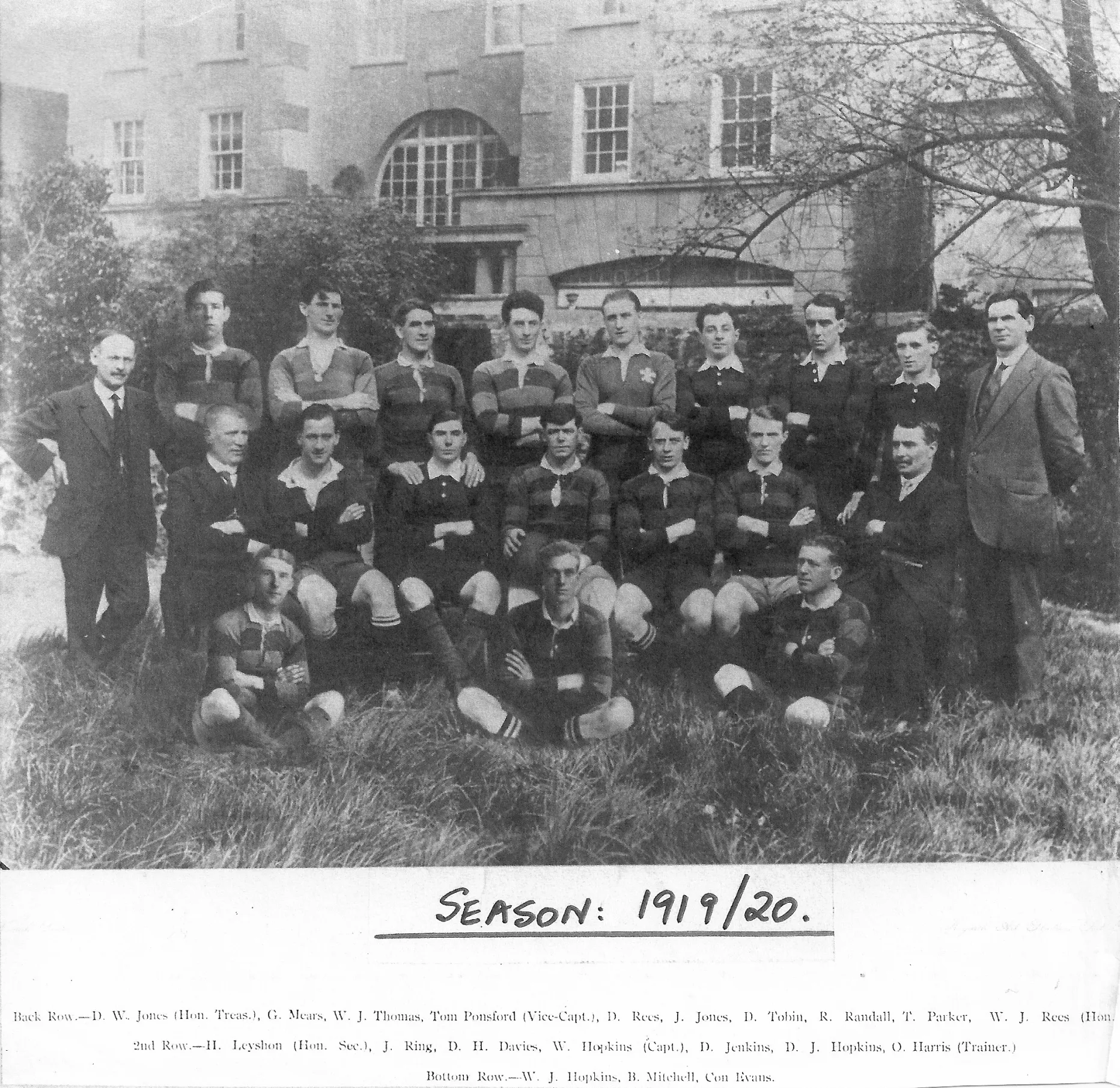

=== Championship final appearances ===
Johnny Ring played right wing and scored 3-tries in Wigan's 22-10 victory over Warrington in the Championship Final during the 1925–26 season at Knowsley Road, St. Helens on Saturday 8 May 1926.

=== Challenge Cup Final appearances ===
Johnny Ring played right wing in Wigan's 13-2 victory over Dewsbury in the 1928–29 Challenge Cup Final during the 1928-29 season at Wembley Stadium, London on Saturday 4 May 1929.

=== County Cup Final appearances ===
Johnny Ring played left wing and scored a try in Wigan's 20–2 victory over Leigh in the 1922–23 Lancashire Cup Final during the 1922–23 season at The Willows, Salford on Saturday 25 November 1922, played right wing and scored 3-tries in the 11-15 defeat by Swinton in the 1925–26 Lancashire Cup Final during the 1925–26 season at The Cliff, Broughton on Wednesday 9 December 1925, played left wing in the 5-4 victory over Widnes in the 1928–29 Lancashire Cup Final during the 1928–29 season at The Willows, Salford on Saturday 24 November 1928, and played left wing and scored a try in the 3-18 defeat by St Helens Recs in the 1930–31 Lancashire Cup Final during the 1930–31 season at Station Road, Swinton on Saturday 29 November 1930.

=== Career Records ===
Johnny Ring set Wigan's club record for most tries in a season with 62 scored during the 1925–26 Northern Rugby Football League season. The 368-tries he scored during his career at Wigan was also a club record, until extended to 478-tries by Billy Boston.

He is one of fewer than twenty-five Welshmen to have scored more than 1000-points in their rugby league career.
