= 1926–27 Challenge Cup =

Rugby league competition

- Duration: 5 rounds
- Winners: Oldham
- Runners-up: Swinton

The 1926–27 Challenge Cup was the 27th staging of rugby league's oldest knockout competition, the Challenge Cup.

== First round ==
Date	Team one	Score one	Team two	Score two
12 Feb	Batley	32	Cottingham	5
12 Feb	Broughton Rangers	18	Castleford	5
12 Feb	Dearham	5	Dewsbury	20
12 Feb	Featherstone Rovers	14	Barrow	0
12 Feb	Halifax	37	Bramley	5
12 Feb	Hull FC	6	St Helens Recs	5
12 Feb	Hull Kingston Rovers	22	Keighley	3
12 Feb	Hunslet	10	Bradford Northern	5
12 Feb	Oldham	8	Salford	0
12 Feb	Rochdale Hornets	8	Leigh	2
12 Feb	Swinton	11	Huddersfield	2
12 Feb	Wakefield Trinity	13	Wigan Highfield	5
12 Feb	Warrington	3	Leeds	12
12 Feb	Widnes	23	Pontypridd	2
12 Feb	Wigan	51	Pemberton Rovers	11
12 Feb	York	9	St Helens	3

== Second round ==
Date	Team one	Score one	Team two	Score two
26 Feb	Batley	7	Featherstone Rovers	0
26 Feb	Hull FC	29	Broughton Rangers	15
26 Feb	Hunslet	3	Oldham	15
26 Feb	Leeds	13	Wigan	3
26 Feb	Rochdale Hornets	0	Hull Kingston Rovers	14
26 Feb	Swinton	10	York	8
26 Feb	Wakefield Trinity	7	Halifax	2
26 Feb	Widnes	2	Dewsbury	2
01 Mar	Dewsbury	13	Widnes	2

== Quarterfinals ==
Date	Team one	Score one	Team two	Score two
12 Mar	Dewsbury	7	Hull Kingston Rovers	2
12 Mar	Leeds	5	Oldham	11
12 Mar	Swinton	19	Hull FC	2
12 Mar	Wakefield Trinity	10	Batley	6

== Semifinals ==
Date	Team one	Score one	Team two	Score two
02 Apr	Dewsbury	0	Swinton	10
02 Apr	Oldham	7	Wakefield Trinity	3

== Final ==
In the Challenge Cup tournament's final Oldham faced Swinton. It was the first radio broadcast of the Challenge Cup final by the BBC. Oldham won 26-7 in the final played at Wigan in front of a crowd of 33,448. This was Oldham’s fourth consecutive appearance in the final and their second win in that period. It was their seventh overall appearance in a Challenge Cup final and their third success overall.
