= 1924–25 Northern Rugby Football League season =

- League: Championship
- Teams: 27
- Champions: Hull Kingston Rovers (2nd title)
- League Leaders: Swinton
- Runners-up: Swinton
- Top point-scorer(s): (Wales) Jim Sullivan ( Wigan) (282)
- Top try-scorer(s): (Wales) Johnny Ring ( Wigan) (54)

The 1924–25 Rugby Football League season was the 30th season of rugby league football.

== Season summary ==
Hull Kingston Rovers won their second Championship by defeating Swinton in the play-off final.

Swinton had ended the regular season as league leaders.

Oldham defeated Hull Kingston Rovers to win the Challenge Cup.

Swinton won the Lancashire League, and Hull Kingston Rovers won the Yorkshire League. Oldham beat St. Helens Recs 10–0 to win the Lancashire Cup, and Wakefield Trinity beat Batley 9–8 to win the Yorkshire County Cup.

== Championship ==
	Team	Pld	W	D	L	PF	PA	Pts	Pct
1	Swinton	36	30	0	6	499	224	60	83.33
2	Hull Kingston Rovers	34	25	3	6	492	171	53	77.94
3	Wigan	36	27	1	8	784	258	55	76.38
4	St. Helens Recs	38	26	3	9	564	267	55	72.36
5	Oldham	34	21	1	12	533	248	43	68.23
6	Leeds	36	21	3	12	341	278	45	62.5
7	Huddersfield	36	21	1	14	458	351	43	59.72
8	Dewsbury	36	20	2	14	310	269	42	58.33
9	Warrington	36	19	2	15	427	386	40	55.55
10	St. Helens	34	17	3	14	325	381	37	54.41
11	Batley	36	19	1	16	441	350	39	54.16
12	Rochdale Hornets	36	18	2	16	348	331	38	52.77
13	Hunslet	36	19	0	17	411	369	38	52.77
14	Wakefield Trinity	36	17	1	18	337	316	35	48.61
15	Keighley	36	17	1	18	305	420	35	48.51
16	Barrow	34	16	1	17	288	336	33	48.52
17	Featherstone Rovers	34	15	0	19	322	364	30	44.11
15	Hull	36	14	3	19	368	422	31	43.05
19	Salford	34	13	3	18	160	399	29	42.64
20	Leigh	34	13	1	20	328	433	27	39.7
21	Halifax	38	14	2	22	317	431	30	39.47
22	Broughton Rangers	34	12	1	21	244	429	25	36.76
23	York	36	12	1	23	272	351	25	34.72
24	Wigan Highfield	32	10	1	21	224	432	21	32.81
25	Widnes	34	10	1	23	257	462	21	30.83
26	Bradford Northern	38	8	4	26	285	584	20	26.31
27	Bramley	36	2	2	32	174	572	6	8.33

== Championship play-off ==
Semi-finals
1	Swinton	20
4	St Helens Recreation	2
2	Hull Kingston Rovers	13
3	Wigan	4

Championship final
Swinton	5
Hull Kingston Rovers	9

== Challenge Cup ==
Oldham beat Hull Kingston Rovers 16-3 in the final played at Leeds before a crowd of 28,335.

This was Oldham’s fifth appearance in the Final and their second win. Their previous Cup Final win was back in 1899.

During this season's Cup competition, Wigan's Jim Sullivan set a Challenge Cup record for the most goals kicked in a match, when he was successful 22 times against the amateur team, Flimby and Fothergill.

== Sources ==
- 1924-25 Rugby Football League season at wigan.rlfans.com
- The Challenge Cup at The Rugby Football League website
