= 1922–23 Northern Rugby Football League season =

1922–23 Rugby Football League season
- League: Championship
- Teams: 27
- Champions: Hull Kingston Rovers
- League Leaders: Hull F.C.
- Runners-up: Huddersfield
- Top point-scorer(s): (Wales) Jim Sullivan ( Wigan) (349)
- Top try-scorer(s): (Wales) Johnny Ring ( Wigan) (41)
- Joined League: Wigan Highfield

The 1922–23 Rugby Football League season was the 28th season of rugby league football.

== Season summary ==
Pre-season the Northern Rugby Football Union decided to drop the 'Union' in favour of 'League' and the first annual conference of the League is held at Keswick.

Hull Kingston Rovers moved from their Craven Street ground to Craven Park at the eastern end of Holderness Road this season. Their first game against Wakefield Trinity on 2 September ended in a 3-0 defeat.

Wigan Highfield joined the League.

Hull Kingston Rovers won their first ever Championship when they defeated Huddersfield 15-5 in the play-off final.

Hull F.C. had finished the regular season as the league leaders and were the first in that position not to contend a play-off final.

The Challenge Cup was won by Leeds when they defeated Hull F.C. 28-3 in the final.

Wigan won the Lancashire League, and Hull F.C. won the Yorkshire League. Wigan beat Leigh 20–2 to win the Lancashire Cup, and York beat Batley 5–0 to win the Yorkshire County Cup.

== Championship ==
	Team	Pld	W	D	L	PF	PA	Pts	Pct
1	Hull	36	30	0	6	587	304	60	83.33
2	Huddersfield	34	26	0	8	644	279	52	76.47
3	Swinton	36	27	0	9	467	240	54	75
4	Hull Kingston Rovers	36	26	1	9	597	231	53	73.61
5	Wigan	36	25	2	9	721	262	52	72.22
6	Leigh	32	22	0	10	378	281	44	68.75
7	Oldham	36	24	0	12	389	236	48	66.66
8	Leeds	38	24	2	12	502	297	50	65.78
9	Rochdale Hornets	36	22	0	14	389	355	44	61.11
10	York	34	17	5	12	254	252	39	57.35
11	St Helens Recs	36	19	0	17	319	292	38	52.77
12	Featherstone Rovers	34	17	1	16	413	368	35	51.47
13	Wakefield Trinity	36	17	2	17	349	306	36	50
14	Batley	36	16	2	18	347	372	34	47.22
15	Warrington	36	17	0	19	348	410	34	47.22
16	Barrow	36	16	0	20	339	444	32	44.44
17	Salford	36	14	2	20	263	421	30	41.66
18	Hunslet	38	14	2	22	316	371	30	39.47
19	St Helens	34	13	0	21	364	427	26	38.23
20	Halifax	38	14	1	23	272	442	29	38.15
21	Dewsbury	36	12	3	21	337	440	27	37.5
22	Widnes	34	11	1	22	195	350	23	33.82
23	Keighley	38	12	1	25	236	449	25	32.89
24	Broughton Rangers	32	10	1	21	230	319	21	32.81
25	Wigan Highfield	32	7	1	24	208	432	15	23.43
26	Bradford Northern	34	6	1	27	180	676	13	19.11
27	Bramley	36	5	2	29	184	572	12	16.66

== Championship play-off ==
Semi-finals
1	Hull	2
4	Hull Kingston Rovers	16
2	Huddersfield	16
3	Swinton	5

Championship final
Hull Kingston Rovers	15
Huddersfield	5

== Challenge Cup ==
Leeds defeat Hull F.C. 28-3 in the final at Belle Vue, Wakefield to win their second Challenge Cup in their second appearance.

Leeds: 28

Leeds Tries: Syd Walmsley, Harold Buck, Billy Bowen, Joe Brittain, Davies, Ashton

Leeds Goals: Joe Thompson 5

Hull FC: 3

Hull FC Tries: Jimmy Kennedy

Half-time: 10-0

Attendance: 29,335 (at Belle Vue, Wakefield)

== Sources ==
- 1922-23 Rugby Football League season at wigan.rlfans.com
- The Challenge Cup at The Rugby Football League website
