= 1926–27 Northern Rugby Football League season =

- League: Championship
- Teams: 29
- Champions: Swinton (1st title)
- League Leaders: St Helens Recreation
- Runners-up: St Helens Recreation
- Top point-scorer(s): (Wales) Jim Sullivan ( Wigan) (322)
- Top try-scorer(s): (England) Alf Ellaby ( St Helens) (55)
- Joined League: Castleford; Pontypridd

The 1926–27 Rugby Football League season was the 32nd season of rugby league football.

== Season summary ==
Swinton won their first Championship by beating St. Helens Recs 13–8 in the play-off final.

St. Helens Recs had finished the regular season as league leaders.

Oldham beat Swinton 26–7 to win the Challenge Cup.

The league increased to 29 clubs with the addition of Castleford and Pontypridd.

St.Helens Recs won the Lancashire League, and Hull F.C. won the Yorkshire League. St. Helens beat St. Helens Recs 10–2 to win the Lancashire Cup, and Huddersfield beat Wakefield Trinity 10–3 to win the Yorkshire County Cup.

== Championship ==
	Team	Pld	W	D	L	PF	PA	Pts	Pct
1	St Helens Recs	38	29	3	6	544	235	61	80.26
2	Swinton	38	29	2	7	471	275	60	78.98
3	Wigan	40	29	0	11	691	366	58	72.5
4	St. Helens	34	23	1	10	538	283	47	69.11
5	Hull	38	25	1	12	434	317	51	67.1
6	Hull Kingston Rovers	36	21	5	10	456	244	47	65.27
7	Leigh	36	23	1	12	404	331	47	65.27
8	Rochdale Hornets	36	23	0	13	378	285	46	63.88
9	Leeds	40	23	1	16	582	371	47	58.75
10	Hunslet	42	24	1	17	533	380	49	58.33
11	Featherstone Rovers	38	21	1	16	504	369	43	56.57
12	Dewsbury	38	20	3	15	344	284	43	56.57
13	Oldham	38	19	4	15	489	346	42	55.26
14	Halifax	40	19	4	17	411	289	42	52.5
15	Wakefield Trinity	36	17	3	16	386	330	37	51.38
16	Warrington	38	18	1	19	409	524	37	48.68
17	Barrow	38	18	0	20	311	412	36	47.36
18	York	36	16	1	19	368	519	33	45.83
19	Batley	36	14	2	20	317	325	30	41.66
20	Salford	36	14	2	20	306	353	30	41.66
21	Broughton Rangers	36	14	1	21	369	392	29	40.27
22	Keighley	36	14	1	21	242	469	29	40.27
23	Huddersfield	40	16	0	24	414	562	32	40
24	Widnes	34	11	0	23	283	479	22	32.35
25	Wigan Highfield	34	9	1	24	239	383	19	27.94
26	Bramley	36	8	1	27	200	636	17	23.61
27	Pontypridd	32	7	1	24	223	447	15	23.43
28	Bradford Northern	36	6	0	30	288	652	12	16.66
29	Castleford	36	5	1	30	274	550	11	15.27

== Championship play-off ==
Semifinals:

St Helens Recreation 33 beat St Helens 0.

Swinton 23 beat Wigan 3.

Final:

Swinton 13 beat St Helens Recreation 8.

== Challenge Cup ==
In the Challenge Cup tournament's final Oldham faced Swinton. It was the first radio broadcast of the Challenge Cup final by the BBC. Oldham won 26–7 in the final played at Wigan in front of a crowd of 33,448. This was Oldham's fourth consecutive appearance in the final and their second win in that period. It was their seventh overall appearance in a Challenge Cup Final and their third success overall.

== Sources ==
- 1926-27 Rugby Football League season at wigan.rlfans.com
- The Challenge Cup at The Rugby Football League website
