= 1921–22 Northern Rugby Football Union season =

- League: Championship
- Teams: 26
- Champions: Wigan (2nd title)
- League Leaders: Oldham
- Runners-up: Oldham
- Top point-scorer(s): Reg Farrar ( Oldham) (213)
- Top try-scorer(s): Reg Farrar ( Oldham) (49)
- Joined League: Featherstone Rovers

The 1921–22 Northern Rugby Football Union season was the 27th season of rugby league football.

== Season summary ==
Featherstone Rovers joined the competition this season.

In November, winger Harold Buck became rugby league's first £1,000 transfer when he moved from Hunslet to Leeds.

Oldham had ended the regular season as the league leaders.

Wigan won their second ever Championship this season when they defeated Oldham 13–2 in the play-off final.

The 1921–22 Kangaroo tour of Great Britain also took place during the season, with many of the clubs playing games against the visiting Australasian team.

Oldham won the Lancashire League, and Huddersfield won the Yorkshire League. Warrington beat Oldham 7–5 to win the Lancashire Cup, and Leeds beat Dewsbury 11–3 to win the Yorkshire County Cup.

== Championship ==
	Team	Pld	W	D	L	PF	PA	Pts	Pct
1	Oldham	36	29	1	6	521	201	59	81.94
2	Wigan	32	22	1	9	446	159	45	70.31
3	Hull F.C.	38	25	0	13	538	326	50	65.79
4	Huddersfield	36	23	1	12	608	271	47	65.28
5	Leeds	38	24	1	13	583	289	49	64.47
6	Batley	38	23	2	13	381	299	48	63.16
7	Rochdale Hornets	34	20	2	12	352	225	42	61.76
8	Halifax	36	21	2	13	418	218	44	61.11
9	Leigh	34	19	3	12	295	228	41	60.29
10	York	36	21	1	14	311	231	43	59.72
11	Hull Kingston Rovers	38	21	0	17	420	356	42	55.26
12	St Helens Recs	36	19	1	16	417	315	39	54.17
13	Dewsbury	36	19	1	16	290	339	39	54.17
14	Barrow	34	18	0	16	311	321	36	52.94
15	Warrington	36	16	1	19	285	418	33	45.83
16	Widnes	32	13	3	16	227	240	29	45.31
17	Wakefield Trinity	36	16	0	20	335	313	32	44.44
18	Broughton Rangers	32	13	2	17	284	247	28	43.75
19	Hunslet	36	13	5	18	215	400	31	43.05
20	Swinton	34	14	0	20	248	312	28	41.18
21	Bramley	34	13	2	19	251	496	28	41.18
22	St. Helens	34	12	1	21	255	399	25	36.76
23	Salford	34	9	4	21	164	312	22	32.35
24	Featherstone Rovers	36	10	2	24	280	463	22	30.55
25	Keighley	36	4	1	31	134	581	9	12.5
26	Bradford Northern	34	2	1	31	134	744	5	7.35

== Championship play-off ==
Semi-finals
1	Oldham	13
4	Huddersfield	5
2	Wigan	27
3	Hull	8

Championship final
Oldham	2
Wigan	13

== Challenge Cup ==
The 1921–22 Challenge Cup was won by Rochdale Hornets who defeated Hull F.C. 10–9 in the final at Headingley, Leeds on Saturday 6 May 1922, in front of a crowd of 32,596. This was Rochdale's first Challenge Cup Final win in their first, and as of 2017 their only, Challenge Cup Final appearance.

== Sources ==
- 1921-22 Rugby Football League season at wigan.rlfans.com
- The Challenge Cup at The Rugby Football League website
