= 1923–24 Northern Rugby Football League season =

1923–24 NRFL season
- League: Championship
- Teams: 27
- Champions: Batley (1st title)
- League Leaders: Wigan
- Runners-up: Wigan
- Top point-scorer(s): (Wales) Jim Sullivan ( Wigan) (319)
- Top try-scorer(s): (Wales) Johnny Ring ( Wigan) (49)

The 1923–24 Northern Rugby Football League season was the 29th season of rugby league football.

== Season summary ==
Batley won their first, and to date only, Championship when they defeated Wigan 13–7 in the play-off Championship Final.

Wigan had ended the regular season as the league leaders and won the Challenge Cup by defeating Oldham 21–4 in the final.

Wigan won the Lancashire League, and Batley won the Yorkshire League. St Helens Recs beat Swinton 17–0 to win the Lancashire Cup, and Hull F.C. beat Huddersfield 10–4 to win the Yorkshire County Cup.

== Championship ==
	Team	Pld	W	D	L	PF	PA	Pts	Pct
1	Wigan	38	31	0	7	824	228	62	81.57
2	Batley	36	24	3	9	432	287	51	70.83
3	Oldham	36	23	2	11	579	296	48	66.66
4	Leigh	34	20	3	11	407	250	43	63.23
5	Huddersfield	36	21	1	14	481	352	43	59.72
6	St Helens Recs	32	19	0	13	363	255	38	59.37
7	Swinton	34	20	0	14	346	312	40	58.82
8	Rochdale Hornets	36	19	4	13	318	330	42	58.33
9	York	36	18	5	13	323	258	41	56.94
10	Hunslet	36	18	5	13	328	332	41	56.94
11	Hull Kingston Rovers	36	19	2	15	408	377	40	55.55
12	Leeds	38	20	0	18	448	350	40	52.63
13	Halifax	38	20	0	18	360	357	40	52.63
14	Widnes	34	16	3	15	275	245	35	51.47
15	Broughton Rangers	34	15	4	15	286	251	34	50
16	St. Helens	34	16	0	18	332	522	32	47.05
17	Hull	38	17	1	20	439	447	35	46.05
18	Dewsbury	36	15	3	18	279	289	33	45.83
19	Wakefield Trinity	36	15	2	19	313	358	32	44.44
20	Warrington	36	16	0	20	341	395	32	44.44
21	Barrow	36	15	1	20	366	372	31	43.05
22	Keighley	36	14	1	21	291	427	29	40.27
23	Featherstone Rovers	36	12	3	21	348	545	27	37.5
24	Wigan Highfield	36	12	0	24	324	428	24	33.33
25	Salford	34	8	1	25	175	466	17	25
26	Bradford Northern	34	8	0	26	190	524	16	23.52
27	Bramley	34	7	0	27	228	528	14	20.58

== Championship playoff ==
Semi-finals
1	Wigan	27
4	Leigh	0
2	Batley	38
3	Oldham	0

Championship final
Wigan	7
Batley	13

== Challenge Cup ==
Wigan beat Oldham 21–4 in the final played at Rochdale before a crowd of 41,381.

This was Wigan's first Challenge Cup Final Win in their second appearance in a Final.

== Sources ==
- 1923-24 Rugby Football League season at wigan.rlfans.com
- The Challenge Cup at The Rugby Football League website
