= 1925–26 Northern Rugby Football League season =

1925–26 Rugby Football League season
- League: Championship
- Teams: 27
- Champions: Wigan (3rd title)
- League Leaders: Wigan
- Runners-up: Warrington
- Top point-scorer(s): (Wales) Jim Sullivan ( Wigan) (274)
- Top try-scorer(s): (Wales) Johnny Ring ( Wigan) (63)

The 1925–26 Rugby Football League season was the 31st season of rugby league football.

== Season summary ==
Having ended the regular season as the league leaders, Wigan went on to claim their third Championship by beating Warrington 22-10 in the play-off final.

Swinton beat Oldham 9-3 in the Challenge Cup Final.

Wigan won the Lancashire League, and Hull Kingston Rovers won the Yorkshire League. Swinton beat Wigan 15–11 to win the Lancashire Cup, and Dewsbury beat Huddersfield 2–0 to win the Yorkshire County Cup.

== Championship ==
	Team	Pld	W	D	L	PF	PA	Pts	Pct
1	Wigan	38	29	3	6	641	310	61	80.26
2	Warrington	36	27	1	8	472	279	55	76.38
3	Swinton	36	26	2	8	442	223	54	75
4	Hull	38	24	3	11	547	329	51	67.1
5	St. Helens Recs	36	23	2	11	437	278	48	66.66
6	Hull Kingston Rovers	34	20	3	11	416	320	43	63.23
7	Oldham	34	19	3	12	431	251	41	60.29
8	Wakefield Trinity	36	21	1	14	445	317	43	59.72
9	Leeds	36	20	2	14	526	311	42	58.33
10	St. Helens	34	18	2	14	410	282	38	55.88
11	Batley	38	20	2	16	325	296	42	55.26
12	York	36	19	0	17	359	350	38	52.77
13	Halifax	38	19	2	17	364	323	40	52.63
14	Barrow	36	17	3	16	313	303	37	51.38
15	Featherstone Rovers	32	15	2	15	362	362	32	50
16	Dewsbury	36	18	0	18	310	402	36	50
17	Widnes	34	15	0	19	339	397	30	44.11
18	Huddersfield	36	14	2	20	365	474	30	41.66
19	Wigan Highfield	32	12	1	19	280	323	25	39.06
20	Hunslet	36	14	0	22	389	435	28	38.88
21	Salford	34	11	4	19	246	393	26	38.23
22	Rochdale Hornets	36	13	1	22	320	414	27	37.5
23	Bradford Northern	38	14	0	24	306	580	28	36.84
24	Leigh	32	8	2	22	270	435	18	28.12
25	Broughton Rangers	34	9	0	25	316	510	18	26.47
26	Keighley	36	9	1	26	290	577	19	26.38
27	Bramley	34	3	0	31	152	588	6	8.82

== Championship play-off ==
Semi-finals
1	Wigan	34
4	Hull	0
2	Warrington	11
3	Swinton	8

Championship final
Wigan	22
Warrington	10

== Challenge Cup ==
Swinton beat Oldham 9-3 in the final played at Rochdale before a crowd of 27,000.

This was Swinton’s second appearance in the Final and their second Cup Final win. Their previous victory was in 1900.

== Sources ==
- 1925-26 Rugby Football League season at wigan.rlfans.com
- The Challenge Cup at The Rugby Football League website
