= Broughton, Salford =

Suburb of Salford, Greater Manchester, England

Coordinates: 53.49842°N 2.258561°W

Broughton
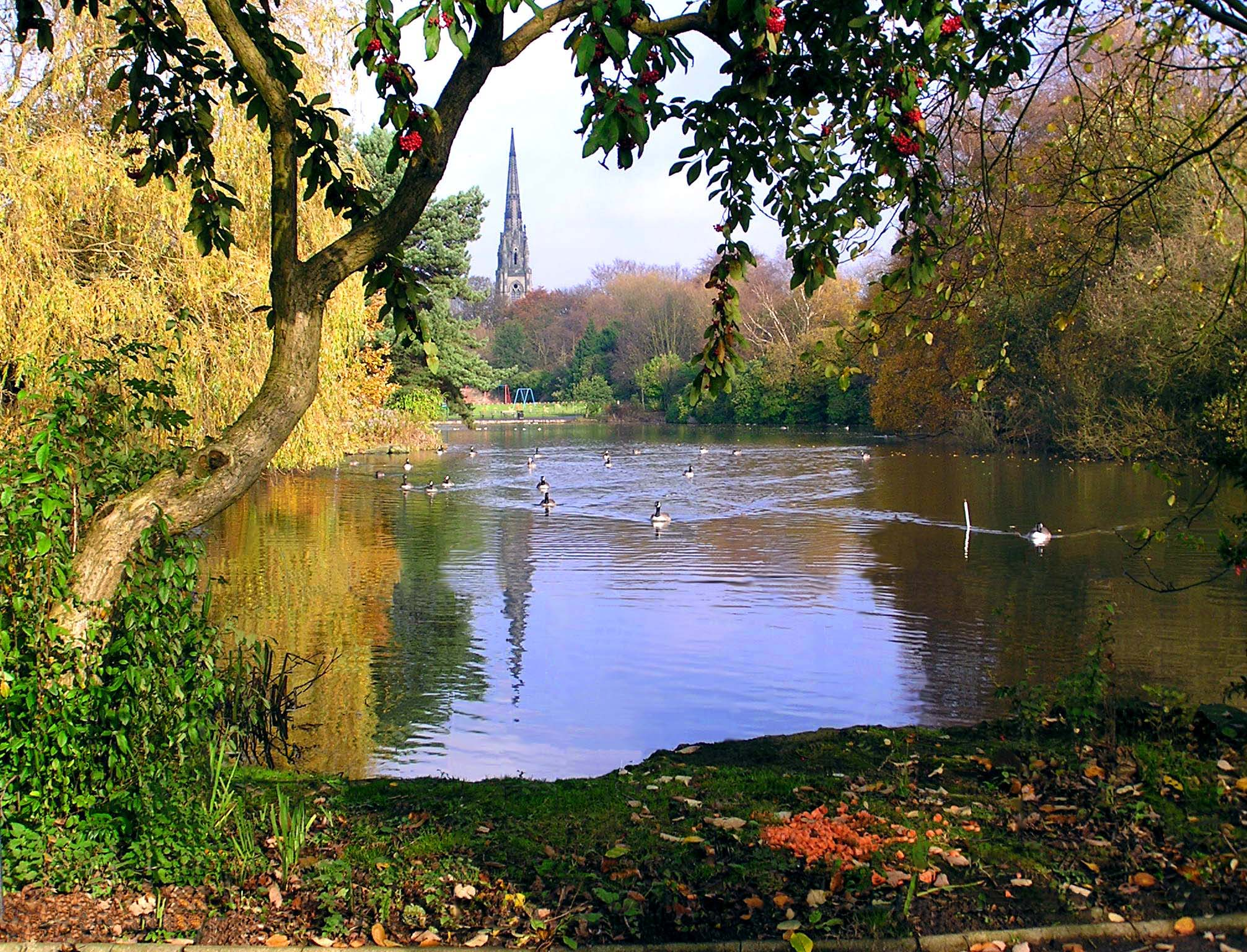
- Clowes Park, Broughton

- Location within Greater Manchester
- Population: 13,869 (2011 ward)
- OS grid reference: SD828002
  - London: 165 mi (266 km) SE
- Metropolitan borough: Salford
- Metropolitan county: Greater Manchester
- Region: North West
- Country: England
- Sovereign state: United Kingdom
- Post town: SALFORD
- Postcode district: M7
- Dialling code: 0161
- Police: Greater Manchester
- Fire: Greater Manchester
- Ambulance: North West
- UK Parliament: Salford
- Councillors: John Merry (Labour); Maria Brabiner (Labour); Jim King (Labour Co-operative)

Broughton is a suburb and district of Salford, Greater Manchester, England. Located on the east bank of the River Irwell, it is 1 mile (1.6 km) northwest of Manchester and 2 miles (3.2 km) south of Prestwich.

Historically in Lancashire, the former manor house, Broughton Hall, belonged to the Chethams and the Stanleys, both distinguished local families, and later passed, by marriage, to the Clowes family. Part of Broughton was amalgamated into the Municipal Borough of Salford in 1844, and the remaining area in 1853.

In the 21st century, parts of Lower Broughton and Higher Broughton have been redeveloped with a mixture of town houses and flats. Together with neighbouring Whitefield, Prestwich and Crumpsall, Broughton is home to a large Jewish community.

== History ==
=== Early history ===
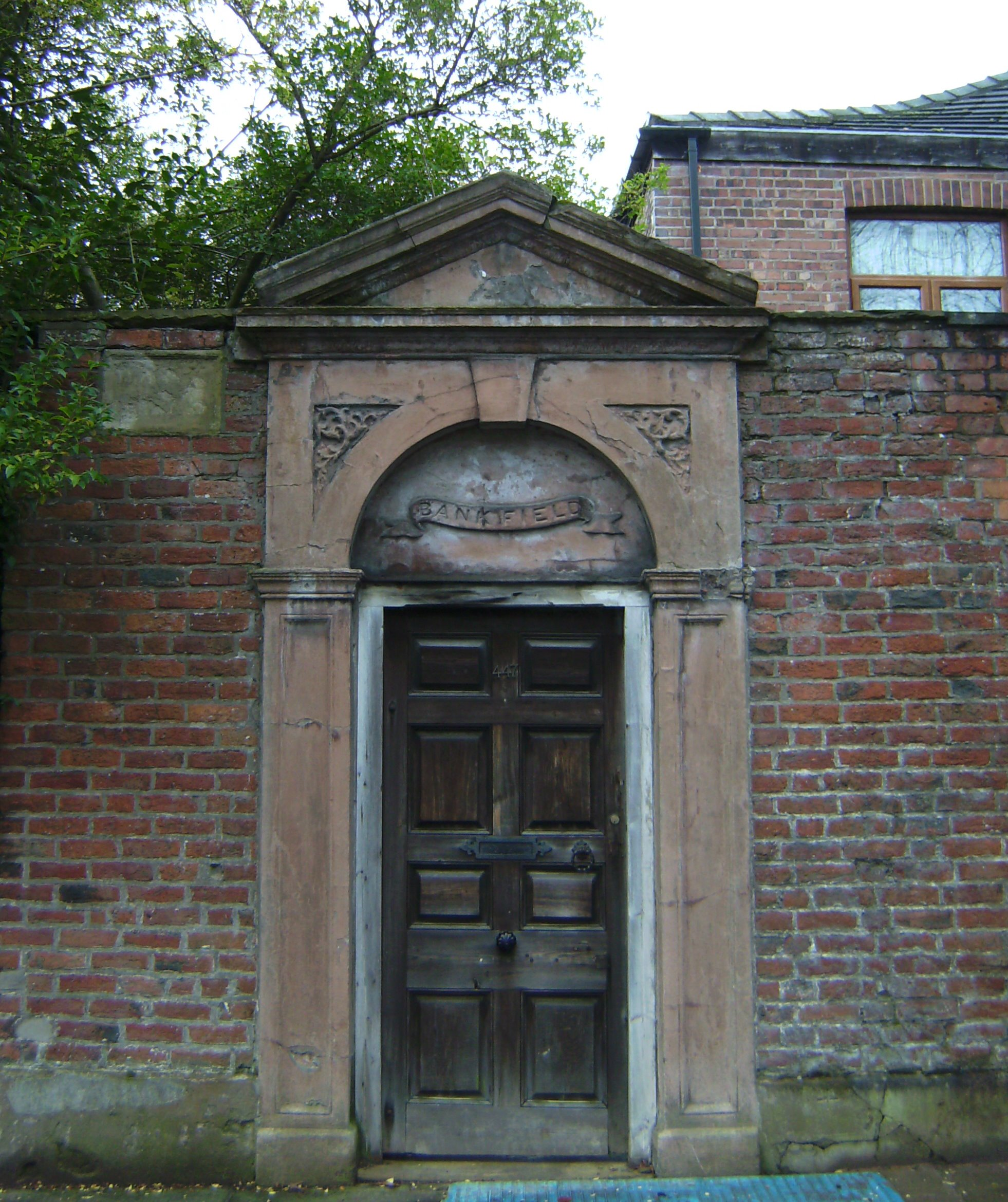
Old entrance gate in a garden wall on the Cliff

Some neolithic implements and other pre-Roman remains have been found in Broughton. The Roman road from Manchester (Mamucium) to Ribchester (Bremetennacum) passed through the area and Roman coins have also been found.

The township of Broughton dates back to 1177 when it was known as Burton, bounded mainly by the meandering River Irwell. To the west of this township, close to a ford across the Irwell, lay the hamlet of Broughton. The Manor of Broughton was formerly an ancient demesne of the honour of Lancaster, being a member of the Royal Manor of Salford. It descended through various families and in 1578 was bought by Henry Stanley, 4th Earl of Derby.

=== Lower Broughton in the 17th century ===
In the 17th century Broughton was still regarded as a member or hamlet of Salford and the area around what is now called The Priory at the northern end of Lower Broughton Road was a picturesque hamlet with a spring, known as Broughton Spout. This was home to the amateur astronomer and mathematician William Crabtree. Crabtree's friend and correspondent Jeremiah Horrocks had correctly predicted the 1639 transit of Venus across the Sun and Crabtree and Horrocks were the first astronomers to observe and record this event on 24 November of that year. The two correspondents both recorded the event in their own homes and may never actually have met, but Crabtree's calculations were crucial in allowing Horrocks to estimate the size of Venus and the distance from the Earth to the Sun. The recording of the event is now seen as the birth of modern astronomy in Britain. In June 2004 a commemorative street nameplate in memory of William Crabtree was unveiled at the junction of Lower Broughton Road and Priory Grove. This site marks the location that is thought most likely to have been the home of Crabtree and his family at the time when he was collaborating with Horrocks. A commemorative plaque was erected in 2005 a few yards away near Ivy Cottage, which is thought to be the house from which Crabtree made his observations.

=== Clowes family become the landowners; early 19th century ===
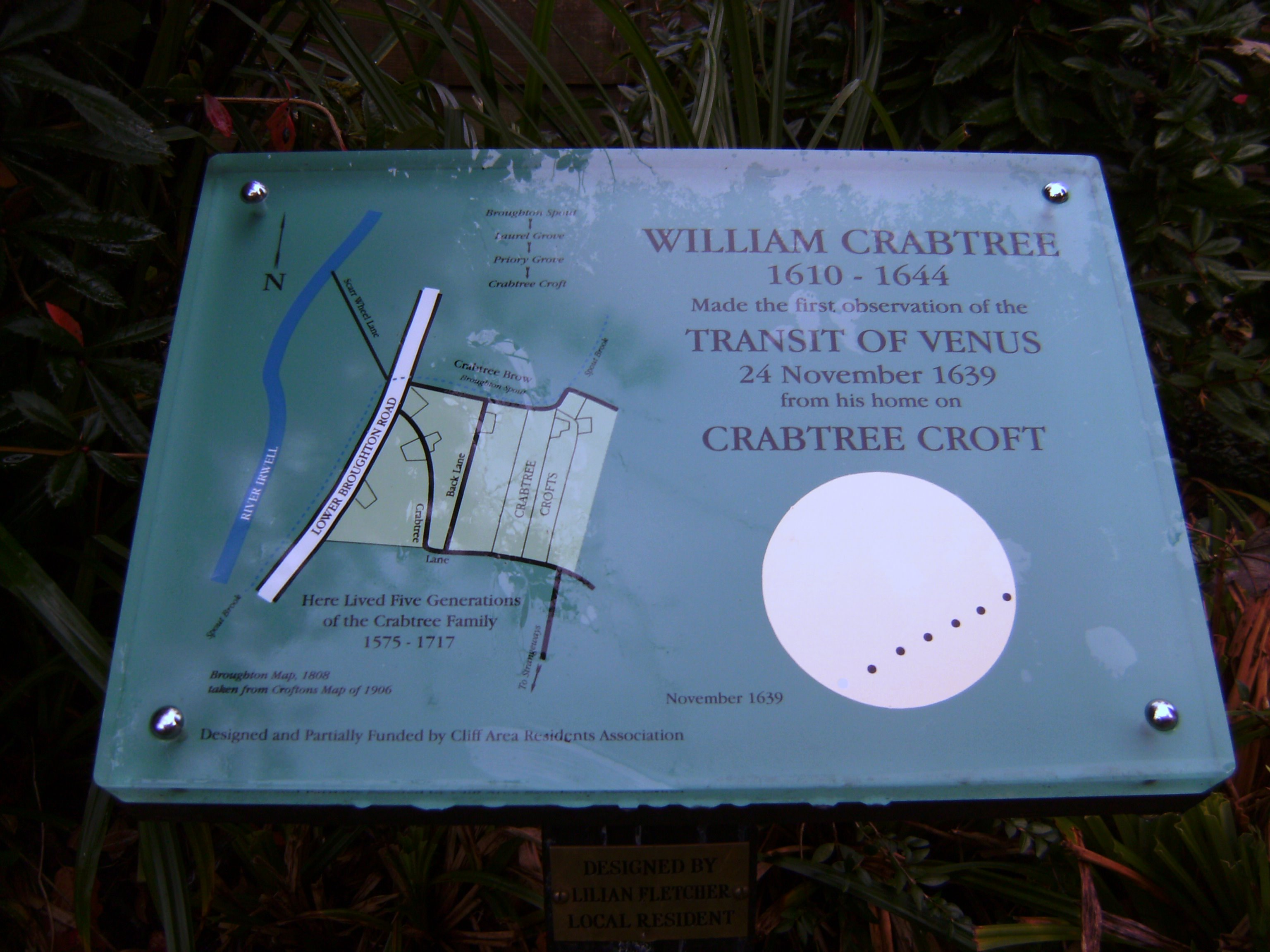
Plaque commemorating Crabtree's observation of the Transit of Venus

In 1772 the Manor of Broughton became the property of Mary, sister of Edward Cheetham of Nuthurst and Smedley who was married to Samuel Clowes. The manor then descended through the Clowes family to the Captain Henry Arthur Clowes. By 1801 the population of the township of Broughton with Kersal was 866. Much of the land was owned by the Clowes family of Broughton Old Hall and the Byroms of Kersal Cell, and was either farmed, or supported cottage industries such as spinning and weaving. Broughton Park, which stretched from Singleton Road to Broom Lane with Broughton Old Hall at the centre, was the estate of the Clowes family. The highlight of the year was the Kersal Moor Races held during Whit Week when the Kersal area became a giant fairground. Archery was also a popular sport for which the Broughton Archers were renowned countrywide.

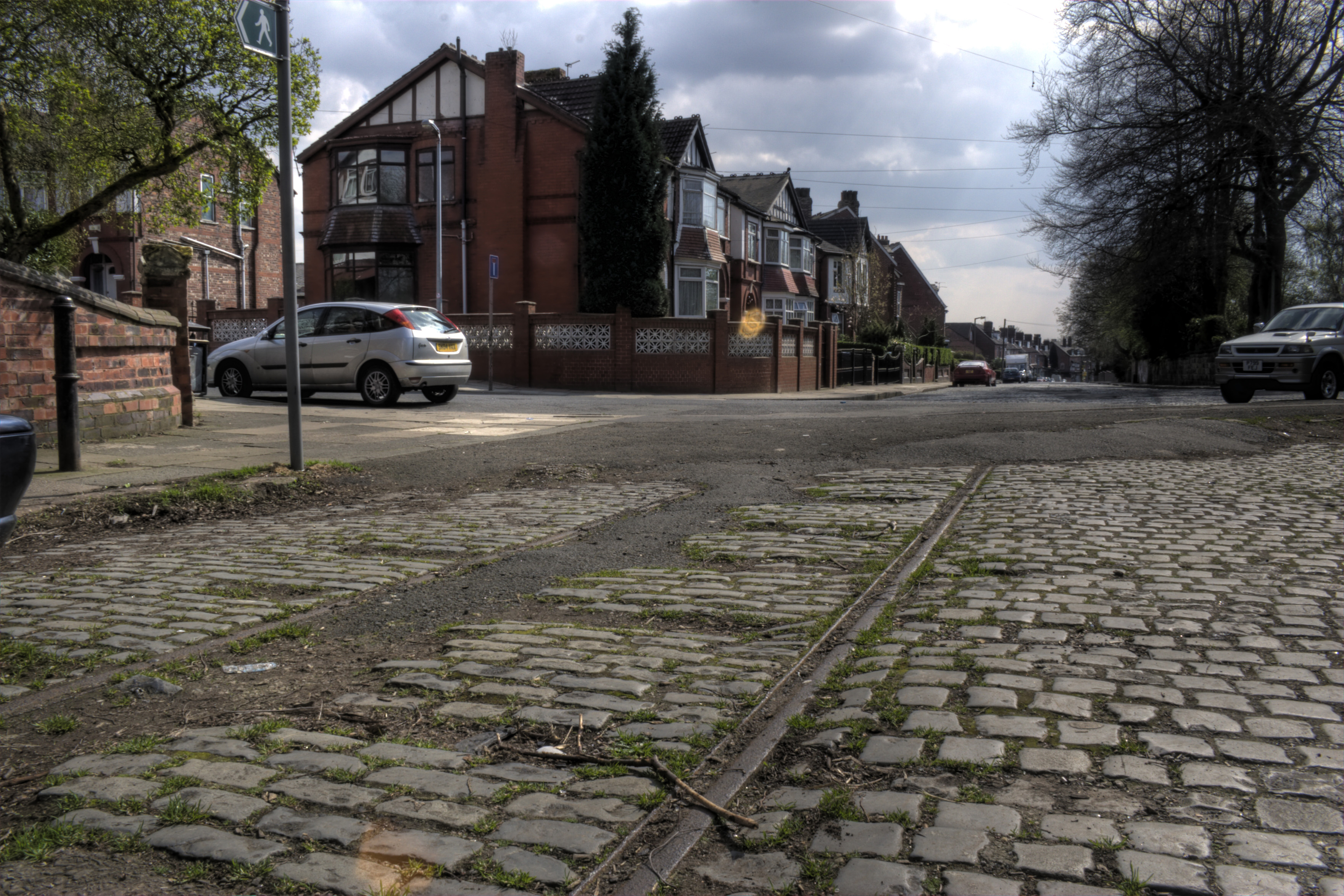
Tram services once criss-crossed Salford. These lines, at the end of Great Clowes Street, are still visible as the road was closed to traffic following a landslip.

During the 19th century the population rose rapidly with the Clowes family controlling the development of the area allowing the wealthy merchants to purchase large plots in Higher Broughton to build their mansions and some grand terraces. By the mid-19th century the majority of residents who lived in the area known as "the Cliff" were members of the professional classes but a number of merchants also resided there. The Cliff was one of the earliest residential suburbs for "commuters" into Manchester and Salford. A number of the houses built for them still stand today and are protected as listed buildings. In 1838 Manchester Zoological Gardens were opened on a site between Northumberland Street and Broom Lane but the venture was not a commercial success and closed 1842. Businessmen from all over Europe and the Mediterranean Sea established branches in Manchester close to the source of supply. In Higher Broughton by mid century there were many prosperous merchants from the Ottoman Empire who had settled around Northumberland Street and by 1861 they had built the Greek Orthodox Church of the Annunciation, Manchester church on Bury New Road. Much of Lower Broughton was undeveloped at this time as it was prone to flooding and one of the few houses, built close to Broughton Bridge was called "Noah's Ark" as it was built on an artificial mound to raise it above the level of the floods. The Church of the Ascension was built in 1869.

=== Broughton incorporated into Salford ===
Broughton was a township and chapelry in the parish of Manchester and hundred of Salford. In 1844 the township of Broughton-cum-Kersal was incorporated into the Salford Borough, despite much opposition from some of the more wealthy residents, who didn't wish to be associated with "the cotton of Manchester or the filth of Salford" even though their wealth had been made in those towns. In 1866 Broughton became a separate civil parish, on 1 April 1919 the parish was abolished and merged with Salford. In 1911 the parish had a population of 53,108.

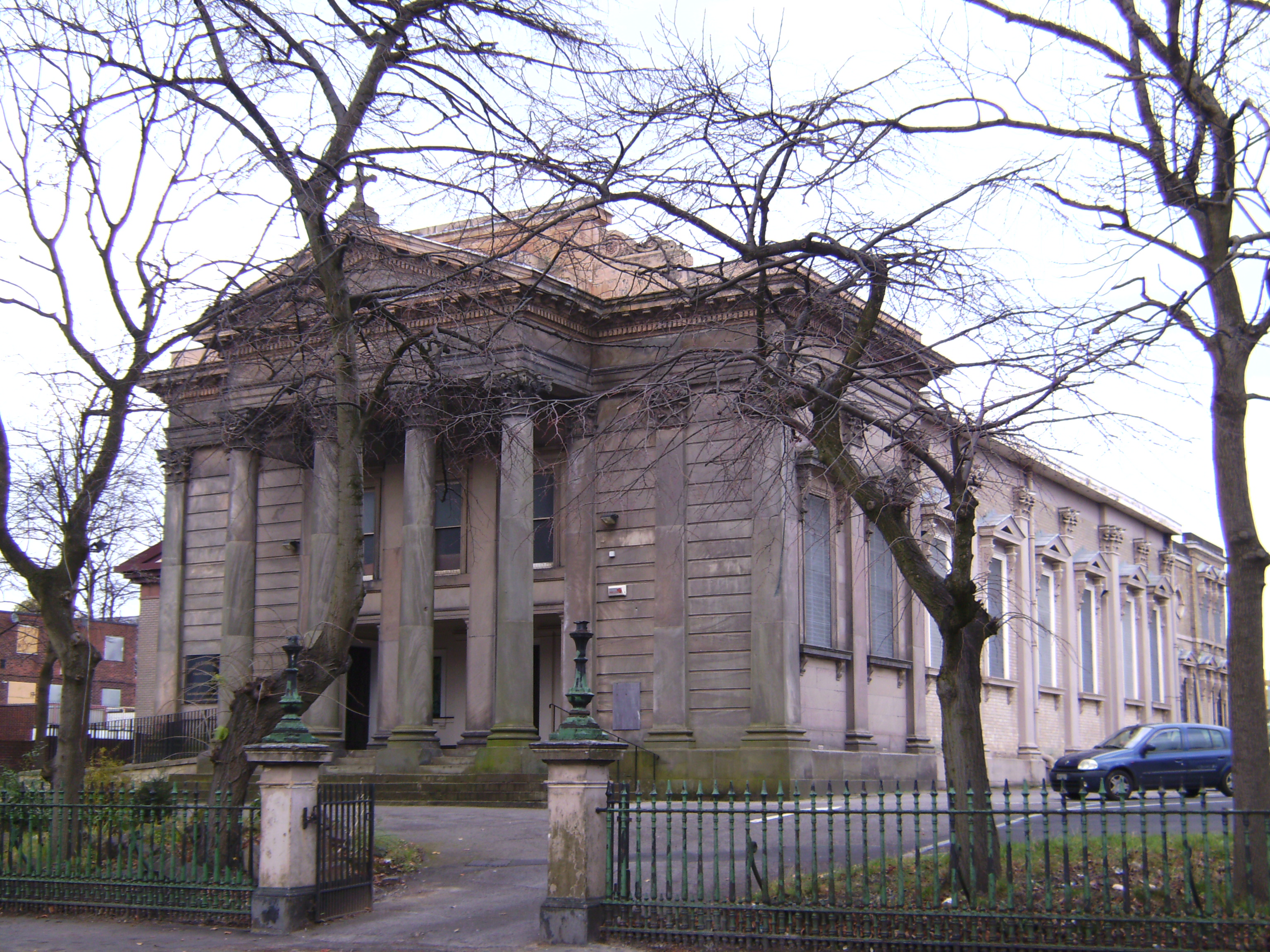
Greek Orthodox Church of the Annunciation

During the latter part of the century large numbers of terraced houses were built for the workers until eventually all of Lower Broughton was built upon. During the course of development the Clowes family kept tight control over the area to ensure that it remained "good class". The land in Higher Broughton was sold in large plots for "villa" type properties and they also restricted the number of pubs that could be built, and then only allowed beer to be sold and not spirits. By 1901 the population had grown to around 49,048.

During the 20th century many of the large houses were divided up and rented out as flats, causing the area to become run down and neglected. Some of the fine Victorian terraces were demolished and replaced with modern housing. The Cliff was designated as a conservation area by Salford City Council in 1976. The designation now covers an area of 26.03 ha (64.42 acres) and has preserved the character of the area with its cobbled streets and many fine buildings.

=== Regeneration ===
In the summer months of 2000, new gardens, fences, gates and porches had begun to be fitted to the local authority houses in Lower Broughton covering the whole of the area by 2006. The gardens were introduced to make the area look neater and more consistent. The council and its arms-length management company "New Prospect", had been working closely with tenants to make sure that their houses were up to standard so that they were good quality council houses. Crime levels have now reduced and the unemployment rate has decreased leading to higher demand for housing in Lower Broughton, which is around one mile (1.6 km) from Manchester city centre. This fact and the availability of affordable housing make it an attractive option for many younger first time buyers.

In 2005, it was announced that an area of housing near Camp Street in Lower Broughton would be demolished to make way for brand new houses. This is part of a wider regeneration project which will later extend to all council houses in the area. Regeneration has been taken on by Salix Homes and Countryside Properties and is planned to be completed by 2014.

Another regeneration project, in Higher Broughton, is known as Broughton Green. Brentnall Primary School, on the corner of Broom Lane and Bury New Road, was demolished as part of this scheme. This school was on the site of a large detached house in its own grounds called Bella Vista. At the time, it had commanding views over the Cliff, looking out toward the Crescent. It was built by a Greek merchant to represent his status in the community. Part of the house burned down, leaving the owner in conflict with the authorities over land tax due, but unpaid on the damaged part of the building. The house was taken by the local authority eventually and became Broughton Grammar School for Girls before it was demolished to make way for Brentnall Primary School. The only evidence of the original house was the gates still there to this day.

== Haredi community ==
Broughton Park is home to a large Haredi and notably Hasidic Jewish community with many Hasidic Sects with a significant presence such as Satmar, Belz, Vizhnitz and Lubavitch

== Demographics ==
Broughton is home to a large Jewish community. In the 2011 census, 14.2% of residents gave their religion as Jewish, compared to 3.3% for Salford and 0.5% for England.

== Governance ==
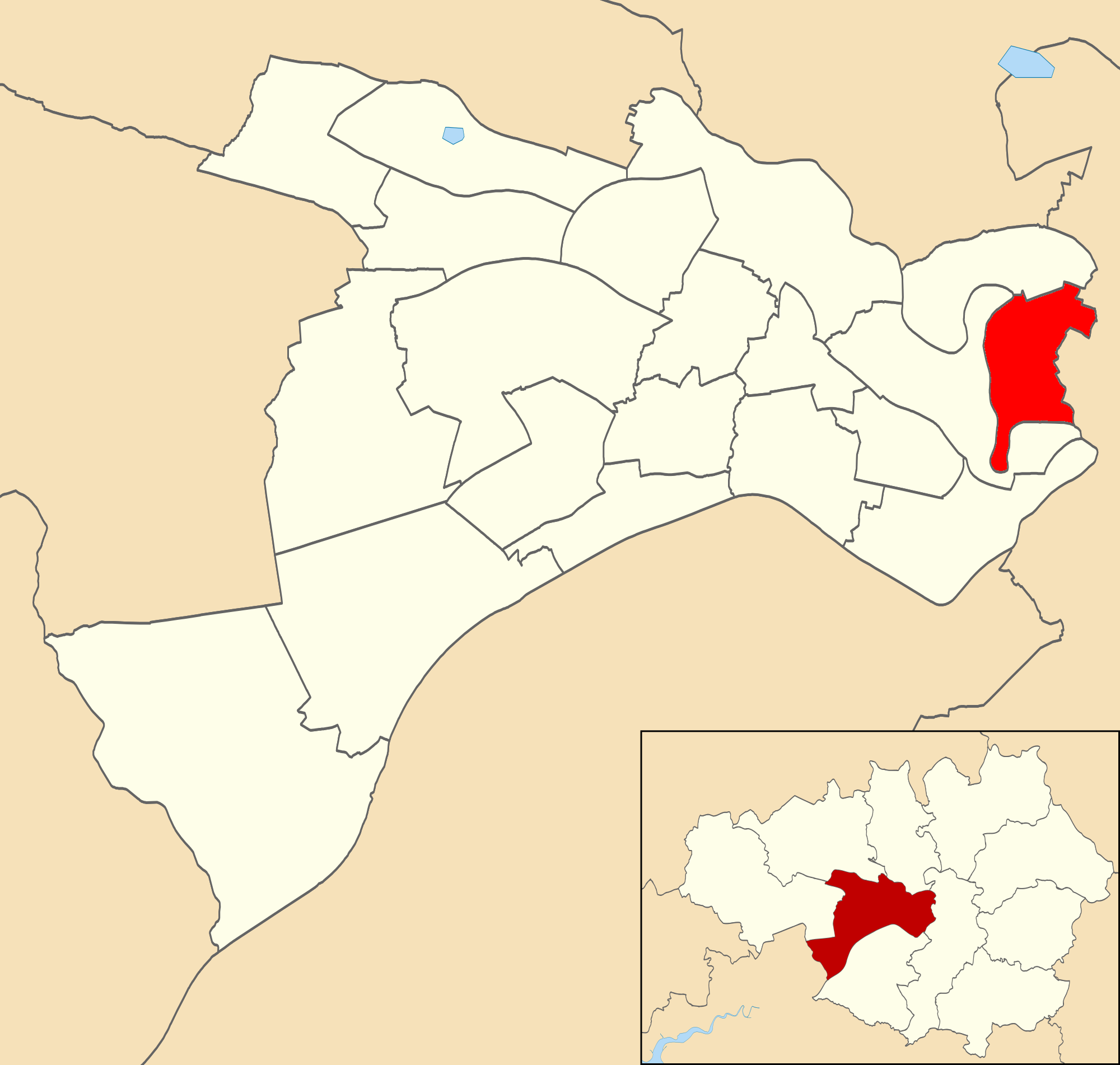
Broughton electoral ward within Salford City Council.

The ward is represented by three councillors: John Merry (Lab), Maria Brabiner (Lab), and Jim King (Lab Co-op).

| Election | Councillor | Councillor | Councillor |
|---|---|---|---|
| 2004 | John Merry (Lab) | Bernard Murphy (Lab) | Jim King (Lab) |
| 2006 | John Merry (Lab) | Bernard Murphy (Lab) | Jim King (Lab) |
| 2007 | John Merry (Lab) | Charles McIntyre (Lab) | Jim King (Lab) |
| 2008 | John Merry (Lab) | Charles McIntyre (Lab) | Jim King (Lab) |
| 2010 | John Merry (Lab) | Charles McIntyre (Lab) | Jim King (Lab) |
| 2011 | John Merry (Lab) | Charles McIntyre (Lab) | Jim King (Lab) |
| 2012 | John Merry (Lab) | Charles McIntyre (Lab) | Jim King (Lab) |
| 2014 | John Merry (Lab) | Charles McIntyre (Lab) | Jim King (Lab) |
| 2015 | John Merry (Lab) | Charles McIntyre (Lab) | Jim King (Lab) |
| 2016 | John Merry (Lab) | Charles McIntyre (Lab) | Jim King (Lab Co-op) |
| 2018 | John Merry (Lab) | Charles McIntyre (Lab) | Jim King (Lab Co-op) |
| 2019 | John Merry (Lab) | Charles McIntyre (Lab) | Jim King (Lab Co-op) |
| 2021 | John Merry (Lab) | Maria Brabiner (Lab) | Jim King (Lab Co-op) |

indicates seat up for re-election.

== Albert Park ==
Albert Park is a public park, with a large football pitch, located by Great Clowes Street and Great Cheetham Street West, on the borders of Higher and Lower Broughton. The park, named in commemoration of the consort (husband) of Queen Victoria, today features a multi-use games area, bowling green, all-weather sports pitch, children's play area and informal five-a-side pitch as well as paths, shrubs and many established trees. Albert Park was opened in 1877 and was described as "16 acres of terraced walkways making it possible to walk 5 miles (8.0 km) around the park without traversing the same ground twice". The park originally featured a 2-acre (8,100 m^{2}) lake which was filled in during the late 1940s.

== Sport ==
=== Rugby football ===
Broughton RUFC formerly Broughton Wasps, was the first Broughton football club in Manchester, and played using the rugby code, founded by members of a club known in 1869 as Broughton College, formed from former pupils of Broughton College, a public school in Salford at the time. It provided a number of early international players and was pivotal in the formation of the Lancashire Football Union.

Broughton Park Rugby Union F.C., is one of the oldest rugby union clubs in England and was established in 1882, just one year after the Lancashire County Rugby Union was founded and eleven years after the formation of the national Rugby Football Union. The club has had a number of different grounds in its time, mainly in the Salford/Prestwich areas, but also in the south of Manchester. Since 2004 its present new facility is at Hough End in Chorlton-cum-Hardy, Manchester. Originally the club had only one senior side, but now fields five senior sides and supported by one Colts (U19), four youth (U13-U17) and four mini (U8-U12) teams; a total involvement of some 320 players each week. Broughton Park R.F.C. is the City of Manchester's highest placed representative in the Rugby Union Leagues.

Broughton Rangers, founded in 1877 as a rugby union club, became a rugby league club as a founder member of the Northern Union in 1895. In 1946, they moved and renamed themselves Belle Vue Rangers. This folded in 1955. They are now being reformed with the assistance of Salford RLFC. Mancunians RL, founded in 2009, play at Broughton Park. They play in the Rugby League Conference.

=== Association football ===
The Cliff in Higher Broughton was the training ground of English football team, Manchester United F.C. until 1999. The training ground still hosts some Manchester United junior and academy team matches.

== Notable people ==
People from Broughton include :hymntune writer Joseph Mainzer (1807-1851) lived in Higher Broughton for the last years of his life. He composed hymn tunes including Ellacombe, Humility, Carmel, Mainzer and YNefoedd.

- Astronomer, mathematician and merchant William Crabtree (1610–1644) was one of the two astronomers, who in 1639 were the first to observe, plot and record a transit of the planet Venus across the Sun.
- Jodrell Professor of Zoology and Comparative anatomy D. M. S. Watson (1886–1973)
- Cricketer William Hickton (1884–1942)
- Comedian Al Read (1909–1987) born and brought up at 11 Kipling Street.
- Singer Elkie Brooks – born Elaine Bookbinder in 1945.
- Playwright/director Mike Leigh OBE, from Higher Broughton.
- Playwright Shelagh Delaney (best known for A Taste of Honey).
- Folk singer/writer Ewan MacColl (best known for "Dirty Old Town" and "The First Time Ever I Saw Your Face"), attended North Grecian Street Primary School.
- Actress Liz Dawn MBE best known for her role as Vera Duckworth in the long-running British soap opera, Coronation Street lived in Broughton Park for many years.
- Mark E. Smith, singer with the Fall, originally from the Cliff.
- Ren Harvieu, singer, from Salford.
- Peter Hook, bassist, guitarist, backing vocalist and keyboardist with Joy Division, New Order, Revenge, Monaco and Freebass.
- Bernard Sumner, vocalist, guitarist and keyboardist with Joy Division, New Order, Electronic and Bad Lieutenant, from Lower Broughton.
- Graham Gouldman, songwriter and bass player/singer with 10cc, from Broughton Park.
- In 1960s and 1970s, Pat Phoenix (26 November 1923 – 18 September 1986) a British actress, best known for her Coronation Street character Elsie Tanner, lived at 23 Epsom Mews with Alan Browning.
- Poet/comedian John Cooper Clarke
- Mike Ward, singer/songwriter who took part in UK series 2 of The Voice; he grew up on the Cliff

== See also ==
- Listed buildings in Salford
