= Athletic Grounds, Rochdale =

Stadium in Greater Manchester, England

Athletic Grounds
- Interactive map of Athletic Grounds
- Full name: Athletic Grounds
- Location: Milnrow Road, Rochdale
- Coordinates: 53°36′46″N 2°08′07″W
- Surface: Grass
- Record attendance: 41,831

Construction
- Built: 1894
- Opened: 1894
- Expanded: 1954
- Closed: 1988
- Demolished: 1988

Tenants
- Rochdale Hornets (1894–1988); Greyhound racing (1932–1969); Speedway (1928–30 & 1970–71)

The Athletic Grounds was a stadium in Rochdale, Greater Manchester, England. It was the home of Rochdale Hornets Rugby League Football Club for over 90 years until 1988. It has also been used for speedway, BriSCA F1 Stock Cars and greyhound racing.

== Origins ==
The Athletic Grounds east of Rochdale opened in 1894 and the new stadium soon became the home of the Rochdale Hornets rugby league club. Situated alongside the Oldham & Rochdale branch railway on its south side the stadium could be accessed from Milnrow Road.

== Rugby league ==
Rochdale Hornets moved to the Athletic Grounds in 1894, their first game took place in September 1894 against Crompton. Between 1896 and 1900, Rochdale Association Football Club played at the Athletics Grounds. Hornets became tenants of the ground in 1900, incidents from the game played on 22 March 1901 resulted in the ground being suspended by the Northern Union.

In 1905, following a disastrous investment into Rochdale Town A.F.C., the Athletic Grounds company went into liquidation, and the premises were bought by a William Watson "and another gentleman" for £100.

In the 1911–12 season, the railway stand was covered and a new covered side on the enclosure side was built. Rochdale Hornets purchased the ground in 1913.

The highest attendance at the Athletic Grounds was the 1924 Challenge Cup final between Oldham and Wigan when 41,831 saw Wigan win 21–4.

A fire destroyed the main stand, dressing rooms and offices on 18 September 1935. A new stand built over the ashes of the old was opened on Saturday 7 March 1936 for the match against Liverpool Stanley.

On 1 April 1939, seventeen spectators were taken to the hospital and two were killed, following the collapse of part of the centre railway stand roof during the Salford versus Wigan Challenge Cup semi-final. The Athletic Grounds holds the distinction of being the scene of the world record for the longest goal kick in rugby league when Swinton, Cumberland and Great Britain second rower Martin Hodgson landed a penalty goal from 77¾ yards in a Hornets v Swinton match played in gale force conditions on 13 April 1940.

In January 1947, a Supporters' Club bar opened under the main stand. This was followed by a Supporters' Club tea bar on 24 September 1949. A food licence was granted on appeal. This was the first tea bar since before the Second World War. Later, a small tea bar was set up on the railway side of the ground, but was destroyed by vandalism.

Hornets borrowed £3,000 from the Rugby Football League in 1954 to build a new covered outer boundary wall and new turnstiles for the main entrance and Waithlands. The highest attendance for a league match was set on Saturday 16 October 1954, Hornets lost 4–18 to local rivals Oldham in front of 19,654 spectators.

A new popular side stand was built by the Supporters' Club in 1958–59 which increased the covered areas to a capacity of 5,000 spectators and the old railway stand, which had been damaged by vandals, was rebuilt in 1970 with the Supporters' Club contributing £1,400 towards the repairs.

=== Rugby league Test matches ===
The list of international rugby league matches played at the Athletic Grounds is:

Game#	Date	Result	Attendance	Notes
1	15 February 1908	New Zealand def. England 8–5	4,013	1907–08 England vs New Zealand series
2	15 January 1930	(United Kingdom) The Lions def. Australia 3–0	16,743	1929–30 Ashes series

=== Rugby league tour matches ===
The Athletic Grounds also saw the Rochdale Hornets play host to various international touring teams from Australia (sometimes playing as Australasia) and New Zealand from 1907 to 1967. Rochdale never won a match against a touring team.

game	Date	Result	Attendance	Notes
1	7 December 1907	New Zealand def. Rochdale 19–0		1907–08 All Golds tour
2	10 October 1908	Australia def. Rochdale 5–0	3,000	1908–09 Kangaroo tour
3	23 December 1911	Australasia def. Rochdale 18–6	4,500	1911–12 Kangaroo tour
4	12 November 1921	Australasia def. Rochdale 16–2	12,000	1921–22 Kangaroo tour
5	7 December 1926	New Zealand def. Rochdale 11–9	7,590	1926–27 New Zealand Kiwis tour
6	7 September 1929	Australia def. Rochdale 36–3	6,521	1929–30 Kangaroo tour
7	5 December 1933	Australia def. Rochdale 26–4	3,603	1933–34 Kangaroo tour
8	13 October 1937	Australia def. Rochdale 6–0	2,400	1937–38 Kangaroo tour
9	15 September 1959	Australia def. Rochdale 27–14	10,155	1959–60 Kangaroo tour
10	19 October 1963	Australia def. Rochdale 26–4	8,637	1963–64 Kangaroo tour
11	16 October 1967	Australia def. Rochdale 25–2	2,676	1967–68 Kangaroo tour

== Speedway ==
Speedway was first held at the Athletic Grounds on 4 August 1928.Speedway arrived in Rochdale at the Athletic Grounds on 25 August 1928 The first speedway death in Britain occurred at the track, when Clifford Mawson was fatally injured on 21 October 1928.

The last meeting took place on 29 August 1930, Rochdale Speedway Limited decided to go into voluntary liquidation, with "waning interest in the sport" being cited as the reason for failure.

On Sunday 29 March 1970, speedway returned to the Athletics Grounds as Rochdale Hornets speedway team took on Crewe. The team moved to Ellesmere Port at the end of the 1972 season.

== Greyhound racing ==
A greyhound racing syndicate brought greyhound racing to the stadium in 1932 with the opening meeting held on 18 June 1932 under British Greyhound Tracks Control Society (BGTCS) rules, the BGTCS were the main rival to the National Greyhound Racing Club (NGRC) at the time.

In 1935 the BGTCS disbanded and the track switched to the NGRC and in 1938 the company failed in an attempt to purchase the ground from the rugby league club. Rochdale Greyhounds Ltd had earned significant profits from their tote deductions alone putting them in a strong financial position as the war approached.

The track had a 450-yard circumference and the racing kennels and paddock were set well behind the main grandstand with the 120 resident kennels further behind these quite near to housing that had been constructed since the opening of the stadium. Race distances were 319, 500 and 530 yards in addition to a 465-yard handicap. The Racing Manager during the 1950s was T H Mitchell assisted by J Edden.

In December 1962 the track decided to leave the NGRC due to falling profits and they went independent (unaffiliated to a governing body), J Dickinson was the Racing Manager but Mitchell & Edden remained at the track. However, during December 1969 the greyhound racing stopped with the Rochdale Greyhounds Ltd citing unsustainable losses and the landlords refusing to renew the lease.

== Stock car racing ==
BriSCA F1 Stock Cars racing was introduced to Rochdale in May 1970. The track was used until 1972, the big criticism being the height of the inner granite kerb stones. designed to protect the rugby pitch. It returned in 1974 under the promotion of Mike Parker Promotions until 1984 when it finally closed. It was a big fast shale track, 440 yds in length. Rochdale also produced 2 of the sports biggest stars, 391 Stuart Smith and 396 Doug Cronshaw.

== Closure ==
In 1987, both Rochdale Hornets and Rochdale A.F.C. were in financial trouble. First to receive an offer for their ground, Hornets accepted Morrison's £2.6m offer for the Athletic Grounds and, following the sale of the land bought a half share in Rochdale A.F.C.'s Spotland Stadium, thus saving both clubs. A Morrisons supermarket now stands on the site.

== Sources ==
- Hornets centenary booklet
