= List of Oldham R.L.F.C. players =

Oldham R.L.F.C. (known as the Oldham Bears from 1996's Super League I to 1997's Super League II, and nicknamed the Roughyeds) is an English rugby league club who have had numerous notable players (1,361 (excludes pre-1895 season Rugby Football Union players) as of 31 October 2018) throughout their history, each player of the rugby league era who has played (and so excludes non-playing substitutes) in a competitive first-class match (including those matches that were subsequently abandoned, expunged or re-played, but excluding friendlies) is included.

== List ==
Heritage #	Player	Debut	Last match	Position	Appearances	Tries	Goals	Drop goals	Points	Records/notes										
Heritage #	Player	Debut	Last match	Position	1412	Tries	Goals	Drop goals	Points	Records/notes	Harry Aaronson	2019	2020	Wing	11	4	0	0	16	Debut on 9 Jun 2019 v Doncaster RLFC
1003	Darren Abram	1992–93	1997	Centre	127	64	11	0	278											
1417	Dan Abram	2020	present	Fullback	26	6	54	0	132	Debut on 2 Feb 2020 v Widnes Vikings										
1438	Jamie Abram	2021	2021	Fullback	6	0	0	0	0											
1294	Jamie Acton	2012	2012	Prop, Second-row	6	0	0	0	0											
1374	Luke Adamson	2017	2017	Prop, Second-row, Loose forward	16	2	0	0	8											
260	James Addison	1927–28	1930–31		11	0	10	0 ^²	20											
1378	Sadiq Adebiyi	2017	2017	Loose forward, Second-row, Prop	11	1	0	0	4	Loan from London Broncos										
1305	Mo Agoro	2013	2014	Wing	40	27	0	0	108											
1471	Patrick Ah Van	2023	2023	Wing	19	15	6	0	72											
740	John Alchin	1970–71	1971–72	Loose forward	11	0	0	0	0	Debut on 30 Jan 1971 v Halifax RLFC										
1499	Bailey Aldridge	2024	present	Hooker	5	0	0	0	0	Debut on 10 Feb 2024 v Barrow Raiders										
839	Adrian Alexander	1979–80	1982–83	Prop, Second-row	80	12	0	0	36											
169	James Allcock	1918–19	1918–19		1	0	0	0	0											
1244	David Allen	2009	2009	Second-row	17	6	0	0	24											
949	Shaun Allen	1988–89	1991–92	Fullback, Wing, Centre, Hooker, Second-row, Loose forward	51	7	0	0	28											
320	Herbert D. Ambler	1935–36	1949–50	Second-row	125	6	0	0	18	Debut on 7 Dec 1935 v St Helens										
1133	Paul Anderson	2003	2003	Centre	22	8	0	0	32											
956	Tony Anderson	1989–90	1990–91	Centre	20	3	0	0	12	Debut on 18 Mar 1990 v Runcorn Highfield RLFC										
1452	Jordan Andrade	2022	2022	Prop, Second-row	11	4	0	0	16	Debut on 30 Jan 2022 v Lock Lane ARLFC										
797	Brian Anglin	1976–77	1978–79		14	0	0	0	0											
125	E. A. "George" Anlezark	1908–09	1913–14	Stand-off	114	35	2	0 ^²	109											
530	Les Anthony	1948–49	1953–54	Prop	113	10	0	0	30	Debut on 28 Aug 1948 v St Helens										
1117	Danny Arnold	2000	2001		11	4	0	0	16	is this Danny Arnold?										
1458	Jack Arnold	2022	2022		2	0	0	0	0	Debut on 3 Apr 2022 v Hunslet RLFC										
815	James Arnold	1978–79	1979–80		14	1	0	1	4											
822	Dennis Ashcroft	1978–79	1978–79		3	0	0	0	0											
735	Keith Ashcroft	1970–71	1976–77	Prop	121	2	4	2	16	Debut on 22 Aug 1970 v York Wasps										
1251	Matty Ashe	2009	2011	Scrum-half	30	12	83	0	214											
1187	Paul Ashton	2006	2007	Scrum-half	22	6	34	0	92											
835	Raymond Ashton	1979–80	1986–87	Stand-off, Scrum-half	212	72	4	26	275	during his time at Oldham he scored forty-seven 3-point tries and twenty-five 4-point tries.										
1344	Tom Ashton	2015	2015		10	5	0	0	20											
246	Fred Ashworth	1926–27	1938–39	Second-row, Prop	436	39	38	0 ^²	193											
465	George Aspinall	1944–45	1944–45		17	9	0	0	27											
769	Peter Astbury	1973–74	1973–74		4	1	0	0	3											
1460	Logan Astley	2022	present	Fullback, Stand-off, Scrum-half	15	15	0	0	60	Debut on 10 Apr 2022 v West Wales Raiders, initially on loan from Wigan Warriors, then signed permanently										
1035	Paul Atcheson	1995–96	1997	Fullback	67	29	0	0	116											
638	Bill Atherton	1961–62	1961–62	Fullback	1	0	0	0	0	is this Bill Atherton (Featherstone and/or Leigh)? a Rochdale Hornets player, who represented a combined Oldham & Rochdale Hornets team against New Zealand in the 1961 New Zealand rugby league tour of Great Britain and France match at Watersheddings, Oldham on Monday 4 September 1961. ¢										
905	Keith Atkinson	1985–86	1991–92		81	15	102	0	264											
107	Albert Avery	1905–06	1913–14	Centre, Stand-off	289	67	0	0	201											
485	Tommy Ayres	1945–46	1947–48		73	8	0	0	24											
581	Dennis Ayres	1953–54	1959–60		85	40	0	0	120											
1178	Andy Bailey	2006	2006	Prop	9	0	0	0	0											
600	Reginald Bailey	1956–57	1956–57		2	1	0	0	3											
1186	Christopher Baines	2006	2009	Second-row	94	16	33	0	130											
229	Ambrose Baker	1923–24	1930–31	Second-row, Prop	166	24	0	0	72											
355	Harold Baker	1939–40	1939–40		1	0	0	0	0											
1473	Zac Baker	2023	2023	Second-row	17	5	0	0	20	Debut on 26 Feb 2023 v Doncaster RLFC										
727	Stephen Baldwin	1969–70	1972–73		6	0	0	0	0											
1230	Simon Baldwin	2008	2008	Prop, Second-row	8	0	0	0	0											
1236	Andrew Ballard	2009	2009	Wing	18	17	93	0	254											
1286	Paul Ballard	2012	2012	Wing	5	2	0	0	8											
686	Peter Bamford	1965–66	1967–68		8	0	0	0	0											
381	… Bancroft	1940–41	1942–43		2	0	0	0	0											
1118	Gareth Barber	2000	2006	Fullback, Stand-off, Scrum-half	138	53	155	1	523											
889	Joseph Bardgett	1983–84	1983–84		4	4	0	0	16											
923	Michael Bardsley	1986–87	1989–90		20	3	0	0	12											
272	Samuel Bardsley	1929–30	1936–37	Centre	138	27	0	0	81	Debut on 1 Mar 1930 v Rochdale Hornets										
256	J. R. Barker	1927–28	1927–28	Wing	4	1	0	0	3											
100	R. Barker	1904–05	1904–05		1	0	0	0	0											
1060	Craig Barker	1998	1999		21	2	0	0	8											
315	Harry Barnes	1934–35	1945–46		49	9	0	0	27											
53	William Barnes	1898–99	1899–1900		8	1	0	0	3											
411	Thomas Barr	1942–43	1944–45		17	2	0	0	6											
517	Irvin Barraclough	1947–48	1950–51	Fullback	78	1	153	0 ^²	309											
1427	James Barran	2021	2021	Scrum-half	10	1	0	0	4	Debut on 20 Mar 2021 v Barrow Raiders										
963	Tony Barrow	1990–91	1991–92	Loose forward	6	0	0	0	0											
579	Roland Barrow	1953–54	1955–56		49	24	0	0	72											
1106	Warren Barrow	1999	2001		28	17	0	0	68											
776	Eddie Barton	1973–74	1977–78		110	21	0	0	63											
384	Thomas Bartram	1941–42	1941–42		3	0	0	0	0											
803	Alan Bates	1977–78	1978–79	Scrum-half	32	7	0	0	21											
199	Alfred Bates	1920–21	1927–28		112	11	1	0 ^²	35											
302	Ted Bates	1933–34	1939–40		33	4	21	0 ^²	54											
929	Ian Bates	1987–88	1992–93		28	1	0	1	5											
527	Bob Batten	1948–49	1950–51		89	20	0	0	60											
493	Leslie Bayliss	1945–46	1945–46		1	1	0	0	3											
203	Frank Beatson	1920–21	1921–22		5	0	0	0	0											
489	… Beck	1945–46	1945–46		1	0	0	0	0											
1415	Jimmy Beckett	2019	2019		10	2	0	0	8											
359	Albert Bell	1940–41	1945–46		13	5	0	0	15											
1021	Adrian Belle	1993–94	1996	Wing	50	15	0	0	60											
1398	Gavin Bennion	2018	2018	Prop, Second-row	2	1	0	0	4	Loan from Salford Red Devils										
70	W. Bent	1901–02	1902–03		12	0	0	0	0											
1373	Liam Bent	2017	2017	Second-row	82	8	0	0	32											
1258	Valu Bentley	2010	2012	Loose forward	58	6	0	0	24											
1183	David Best	2006	2006		14	0	0	0	0											
1184	Jason Best	2006	2006		1	0	0	0	0											
709	Gary Beverley	1968–69	1969–70		8	1	0	0	3											
215	Ben Beynon	1922–23	1925–26	Centre, Stand-off	94	25	1	0 ^²	77											
116	David Beynon	1907–08	1908–09	Stand-off	49	16	0	0	48											
1436	Jack Bibby	2021	2022	Prop	4	1	0	0	4	On loan from Wigan Warriors										
1353	Jake Bibby	2016	2016	Wing, Centre	3	0	0	0	0	Loan from Salford Red Devils										
1160	Ricky Bibey	2005	2005	Prop	21	0	0	0	0											
138	Bill Biggs	1911–12	1920–21		79	7	1	0 ^²	23											
874	Terry Bilsbury	1982–83	1982–83	Centre, Stand-off	9	3	0	0	9											
984	Jeff Bimson	1991–92	1991–92		1	0	0	0	0											
360	… Binns	1940–41	1941–42		3	1	0	0	3											
636	Michael Bird	1961–62	1961–62		15	12	0	0	36											
883	Ian Birkby	1983–84	1985–86	Stand-off	45	10	0	1	41											
873	Gary Bishop	1982–83	1984–85	Fullback, Stand-off	15	2	0	1	8	during his time at Oldham he scored one 3-point tries and one 4-point try.										
965	Richard Blackman	1990–91	1990–91		1	0	0	0	0											
817	Bob Blackwood	1978–79	1980–81	Second-row	24	4	0	0	12											
1367	Jack Blagbrough	2016	2017	Prop	7	2	0	0	8	Loan from Sheffield Eagles										
733	John Blair	1969–70	1978–79		115	15	119	8	292	during his time at Oldham he scored one 2-point drop goal, and seven 1-point drop goals										
504	Kenneth Blan	1945–46	1945–46		1	0	0	0	0											
1001	Jamie Bloem	1992–93	1992–93	Fullback, Wing, Centre, Scrum-half, Second-row, Loose forward	12	2	0	0	8											
1316	Dale Bloomfield	2013	2014	Wing	43	31	1	0	126											
307	Frank Blossom	1934–35	1934–35		11	0	0	0	0											
416	Mat Boland	1942–43	1942–43		1	0	0	0	0											
738	Dick Bonser	1970–71	1971–72		39	0	0	0	0											
2	Emanuel Bonser	1895–96	1902–03		195	8	0	0	24	also RFU pre-1895?										
405	Charlie Booth	1942–43	1942–43	Hooker, Second-row	6	0	0	0	0	WW2 guest from Hull F.C.										
1247	Andrew Boothroyd	2009	2009		2	0	0	0	0											
1078	Josh Bostock	1999	1999	Centre	7	3	0	0	12											
646	Charlie Bott	1962–63	1966–67	Prop, Second-row	166	15	0	0	45											
1194	Matthew Bottom	2006	2006		13	2	0	0	8											
758	Stuart Bottom	1972–73	1975–76		27	4	0	0	12											
1202	Jason Boults	2007	2014	Prop	192	19	0	0	76											
720	Colin Bowden	1969–70	1971–72		5	0	0	0	0											
97	Harry Bowers	1903–04	1905–06		7	1	0	0	3											
1324	Anthony Bowman	2013	2013		2	0	0	0	0											
391	Frank Bowyer	1941–42	1943–44		30	2	1	0 ^²	8											
400	Walter Bowyer	1942–43	1942–43		1	0	0	0	0											
878	Dennis Boyd	1982–83	1982–83	Second-row, Loose forward	3	0	0	0	0											
33	Alec Boyd	1895–96	1895–96		1	1	0	0	3	also RFU pre-1895?										
12	Charley Bradbury	1895–96	1897–98		15	5	0	0	15	also RFU pre-1895?										
974	David Bradbury	1991–92	1997	Second-row, Prop, Loose forward	91	19	0	0	76											
1267	Jack Bradbury	2011	2011	Centre	9	3	0	0	12											
1122	John Braddish	2001	2002	Centre	23	7	63	2	156											
372	Frank Bradley	1940–41	1940–41		1	0	0	0	0											
1322	Niall Bradley	2013	2013		1	0	0	0	0											
369	Tommy Bradshaw	1940–41	1940–41	Scrum-half	1	0	0	0	0											
772	James Brady	1973–74	1973–74		1	0	0	0	0	is this Jim Brady										
68	Phil Brady	1901–02	1902–03		34	3	0	0	9											
1087	Paul Brassington	1999	1999		6	1	0	0	4											
1283	Daniel Bravo	2011	2011		9	3	0	0	12											
793	Steve Breheney	1976–77	1976–77		1	0	0	0	0											
679	Norman Brelsford	1965–66	1965–66		2	0	0	0	0											
1090	Keith Brennan	1999	2005	Hooker	105	35	9	6	164											
1154	Christopher Brett	2004	2004		1	0	0	0	0											
127	Tommy Brice	1909–10	1913–14	Scrum-half	28	3	0	0	9											
1387	Danny Bridge	2018	2021	Second-row	58	20	0	0	80	Debut on 18 Feb 2018 v Whitehaven RLFC										
914	Gary Bridge	1986–87	1986–87	Five-eighth, Wing, Centre, Halfback	18	8	0	0	32											
1425	Tom Brierley	2021	2023	Wing	26	7	0	0	28	Debut on 20 Mar 2021 v Barrow Raiders										
699	Wilfred Briggs	1967–68	1971–72		73	44	28	0 ^²	188	also Leigh										
1365	Craig Briscoe	2016	2018	Second-row	31	8	0	0	32											
1262	Mark Brocklehurst	2010	2012	Wing	45	26	0	0	104											
1404	Adam Brook	2019	2019		13	3	12	0	36											
238	E. Brook	1925–26	1932–33		2	0	0	0	0											
451	… Brooke	1943–44	1943–44		1	0	0	0	0											
329	Walter Brooks	1936–37	1937–38		3	0	0	0	0											
301	Edgar Brooks	1933–34	1950–51	Second-row	293	13	0	0	39											
1216	Matty Brooks	2007	2008		37	3	0	0	12											
35	Harry Broome	1896–97	1902–03		137	5	0	0	15											
668	William "Bill" Broomhead	1964–65	1967–68		30	0	6	0 ^²	12											
1323	Dan Brotherton	2013	2013		1	0	0	0	0											
225	Albert Brough MM	1923–24	1928–29	Second-row, Loose forward	170	68	185	0 ^²	574											
1343	Jodie Broughton	2015	2015	Wing	1	2	0	0	8	Dual-reg with Huddersfield Giants										
1079	Daniel Brown	1999	1999	Scrum-half	31	14	42	0	140											
209	Fred Brown	1921–22	1923–24	Prop, Second-row	78	11	0	0	33											
297	H. Brown	1933–34	1935–36		7	1	0	0	3											
420	J. Brown	1942–43	1944–45		2	0	0	0	0											
1234	Michael Brown	2008	2008	Centre	2	2	0	0	8	Debut on 10 Aug 2008 v Barrow Border Raiders										
390	R. "Bob" Brown	1941–42	1941–42		2	0	0	0	0	is this Bob Brown?										
778	Richard "Dickie" Brown	1973–74	1976–77		53	15	0	1	46											
1131	Stephen Brown	2001	2002		1	0	0	0	0											
986	… Buckley	1991–92	1991–92		1	0	0	0	0											
689	Trevor Buckley	1966–67	1971–72		90	3	0	0	9											
1149	James Bunyan	2004	2004	Centre	14	7	0	0	28											
462	… Burke	1944–45	1944–45		1	0	0	0	0											
187	Frederick Burke	1919–20	1920–21		13	2	0	0	6											
1357	Joseph Burke	2016	2017	Prop	47	9	0	0	36											
917	Mick Burke	1986–87	1988–89	Fullback, Wing, Stand-off	50	9	56	1	149											
680	Alan Burns	1965–66	1965–66	Second-row	25	1	0	0	3											
1031	Gary Burns	1994–95	1996	Hooker	17	2	0	0	8											
437	Jack Burrow	1943–44	1943–44		1	0	0	0	0											
69	… Bush	1901–02	1901–02		1	0	0	0	0											
1466	Robbie Butterworth	2022	2022	Hooker	9	2	0	0	8	Debut on 5 Jun 2022 v Swinton Lions										
278	Bill Butterworth	1930–31	1942–43 ^¹		49	4	0	0	12	Two spells										
819	Harold Byram	1978–79	1979–80		4	0	0	0	0											
550	Bob Byrne	1949–50	1949–50		10	0	0	0	0											
977	Ged Byrne	1991–92	1992–93	Wing, Centre, Stand-off	28	7	0	0	28											
409	G. Cadd	1942–43	1943–44		21	0	0	0	0											
846	Brian Caffery	1980–81	1985–86	Fullback, Wing, Centre, Stand-off	112	16	12	0	74	during his time at Oldham he scored fourteen 3-point tries and two 4-point tries.										
1176	Mick Callan	2006	2006		9	0	0	0	0											
1409	Ben Calland	2019	2019		9	0	0	0	0											
450	R. Camac	1943–44	1943–44		1	0	0	0	0											
1457	Callum Cameron	2022	2023	Second-row	23	3	0	0	12	Debut on 3 Apr 2022 v Hunslet RLFC										
1128	Christopher Campbell	2001	2006 ^¹	Wing	25	12	0	0	48	Two spells										
1097	Mark Campbell	1999	2000	Second-row	27	5	0	0	20											
263	Samuel Campbell	1928–29	1928–29		1	0	0	0	0											
677	Thomas Canning	1965–66	1969–70	Scrum-half	138	27	4	0 ^²	89	Debut on 31 Aug 1965 v Whitehaven RLFC										
1223	Daryl Cardiss	2008	2008	Fullback	14	2	0	0	8											
89	Reuben Carpenter	1903–04	1905–06		30	11	3	0 ^²	39											
1463	Connor Carr	2022	2023	Centre	31	14	0	0	56	Debut on 24 Apr 2022 v Cornwall RLFC										
592	Ian Carruthers	1955–56	1957–58		11	0	0	0	0											
217	R. Carruthers	1922–23	1922–23		4	0	0	0	0											
166	Harry Carter	1918–19	1922–23		44	3	0	0	9											
231	Percy Carter	1924–25	1926–27		39	3	0	0	9											
541	Jack Casey	1948–49	1948–49		4	4	0	0	12											
1284	Callum Casey	2011	2011	Stand-off, Hooker, Second-row, Loose forward	9	3	0	0	12											
904	Leo Casey	1985–86	2002 ^¹	Prop	149	22	0	0	88	Two spells										
80	Thomas Cash	1902–03	1909–10 ^¹	Halfback, Wing	139	63	0	0	189	Two spells. Awarded MM in World War I at Paschendale.										
191	E. Catterall	1919–20	1920–21		10	0	1	0 ^²	2											
298	Bob Cattlin	1933–34	1942–43 ^¹	Loose forward	103	24	21	0 ^²	114	Two spells. 1st debut on 28 Oct 1933 v Warrington RLFC										
618	Derek Cawthra	1959–60	1959–60		1	0	0	0	0											
879	Leslie Chadwick	1982–83	1984–85	Second-row	9	0	0	0	0											
528	James Chalmers	1948–49	1949–50		17	1	0	0	3											
1256	Joe Chandler	2010	2010	Second-row	28	12	0	0	48											
1494	James Chapelhow	2024	present	Prop	9	0	0	0	0											
1498	Ted Chapelhow	2024	present	Prop	9	3	0	0	12											
808	Christopher Charles	1977–78	1978–79		24	0	0	0	0											
1419	Lewis Charnock	2020	2021	Scrum-half, Stand-off, Hooker	27	3	0	0	12	Debut on 2 Feb 2020 v Widnes Vikings										
656	John Cheshire	1962–63	1963–64	Centre	10	0	0	0	0											
22	Alfred Childs	1895–96	1897–98		38	4	0	0	12	also RFU pre-1895?										
1351	Jamel Chisholm	2016	2017	Wing	30	11	0	0	44											
890	Christopher Chisnall	1984–85	1985–86		9	0	0	0	0											
973	Gary Christie	1991–92	1992–93	Wing	34	17	0	0	68											
729	Bill Churm	1969–70	1972–73		51	4	0	0	12											
62	Charles Civil	1900–01	1905–06		109	33	0	0	99											
953	Brett Clark	1989–90	1990–91	Halfback	70	28	0	0	112											
911	Bruce Clark	1986–87	1986–87	Prop	28	4	0	0	16	is this Bruce Clark?										
715	Raymond Clark	1968–69	1971–72		95	19	0	0	57											
499	Arthur Clarke	1945–46	1945–46		9	1	0	0	3											
723	Brian Clarke	1969–70	1970–71		10	0	1	0 ^²	2											
1257	Christopher Clarke	2010	2012	Prop, Second-row, Loose forward	55	11	0	0	44	is this Chris Clarke?										
1328	Christopher Clarke	2013	2013		2	1	1	0	6	is this Christopher Clarke?										
799	Colin Clarke	1976–77	1976–77		4	0	0	0	0	is this Colin Clarke?										
1018	John Clarke	1993–94	1997	Hooker	87	11	0	0	44											
792	Peter Clarke	1976–77	1976–77		3	0	0	0	0											
849	Geoffrey Clarkson	1980–81	1980–81	Prop, Second-row	11	0	0	0	0											
912	Neil Clawson	1986–87	1989–90	Prop	82	6	0	0	24											
766	Terry Clawson	1973–74	1974–75	Prop, Second-row	22	1	26	0 ^²	55											
1335	Adam Clay	2014	2018	Wing	93	44	0	0	176											
1153	Adam Clayton	2004	2004		1	0	0	0	0											
241	Abe Clayton	1925–26	1935–36	Hooker	195	16	0	0	48	Debut on 30 Jan 1926 v Rochdale Hornets										
223	Archie Clegg	1922–23	1922–23		1	0	0	0	0											
1056	Jason Clegg	1998	2003	Prop	148	8	0	0	32											
981	Michael Clements	1991–92	1991–92		1	0	0	0	0											
1272	John Clough	2011	2012	Hooker	49	16	0	0	64											
1086	Michael Coates	1999	1999		6	0	1	0	2											
989	Stuart Cocker	1992–93	1992–93		14	8	0	0	32											
947	John Cogger	1988–89	1990–91	Loose forward	62	31	0	0	124											
212	Harry Coleman	1921–22	1921–22		1	1	0	0	3											
185	Jack Collins	1919–20	1925–26	Second-row	247	25	0	0	75	Debut on 23 Aug 1919 v Warrington										
218	John Collins	1922–23	1922–23		5	1	0	0	3											
664	Joseph Collins	1964–65	1972–73		72	14	0	0	42											
427	… Collinson	1942–43	1942–43		1	0	0	0	0											
230	Herbert Comm	1924–25	1927–28	Fullback	59	0	3	0 ^²	6											
812	Barry Connor	1978–79	1979–80		9	0	0	0	0											
1348	Jake Connor	2015	2015	Centre, Stand-off, Fullback, Scrum-half	2	1	0	0	4	Dual-reg with Huddersfield Giants										
976	Tony Conroy	1991–92	1991–92		7	0	0	0	0											
120	George Cook	1908–09	1913–14		113	30	6	0 ^²	102											
863	Leslie Cook	1981–82	1985–86		14	2	0	0	6											
1445	Will Cooke	2022	2022	Wing	12	1	0	0	4	Debut on 30 Jan v Lock Lane ARLFC										
1319	David Cookson	2012	2014	Centre	54	17	0	0	68											
870	Michael Coombes	1982–83	1983–84	Prop, Second-row	14	2	0	0	6											
1065	Sean Cooper	1998	1998		15	4	1	0	18											
927	Tony Copeland	1987–88	1987–88		2	0	0	0	0											
1456	Liam Copland	2022	2022	Wing	12	7	0	0	28	Debut on 3 Apr 2022 v Hunslet RLFC										
1177	Ged Corcoran	2006	2006	Prop, Second-row	14	1	0	0	4											
1175	Wayne Corcoran	2006	2006	Stand-off	16	3	5	0	22											
436	William Corfield	1943–44	1943–44		2	0	0	0	0											
747	Bruce Cornwell	1971–72	1971–72		1	0	0	0	0											
224	Joe Corsi	1923–24	1927–28	Wing	150	107	0	0	321											
275	J. Costello	1930–31	1930–31		1	2	0	0	6											
1206	Geno Costin	2007	2007	Second-row	25	8	0	0	32											
1080	Gary Coulter	1999	1999		6	0	0	0	0											
1454	Jack Coventry	2022	2022	Prop, Second-row	14	0	0	0	0	Debut on 30 Jan 2022 v Lock Lane ARLFC										
1038	Jimmy Cowan	1995–96	1999 ^¹	Wing	16	0	0	0	0	Two spells										
1125	Will Cowell	2001	2005	Wing, Centre	64	18	0	0	72											
854	Michael Cowley	1980–81	1980–81	Wing	2	2	0	0	6											
886	Craig Coyle	1983–84	1983–84	Prop	6	1	0	0	4											
1217	James Coyle	2007	2009	Stand-off, Scrum-half	71	37	8	0	164	Debut on 8 Jul 2007 v Swinton Lions										
1238	Thomas Coyle	2009	2009	Scrum-half	26	15	0	0	60											
1207	Andrew Crabtree	2007	2007	Loose forward	24	1	0	0	4											
580	Dick Cracknell	1953–54	1958–59	Wing	213	119	28	0 ^²	413											
1490	Danny Craven	2024	present	Stand-off, Scrum-half, Fullback	9	2	5	0	18	Debut on 10 Feb 2024 v Barrow Raiders										
836	Glen Crehan	1979–80	1979–80		2	1	0	0	3											
716	James Crellin	1968–69	1969–70		37	7	31	0 ^²	83											
1422	Jack Croft	2020	2021	Centre	4	1	0	0	4	Two separate loan stints from Wakefield Trinity; 2020 & 2021 respectively										
1016	Martin Crompton	1993–94	1997	Scrum-half	118	41	0	11	175											
625	John Crook	1959–60	1959–60		2	0	0	0	0											
1041	Paul Crook	1995–96	1999 ^¹	Stand-off	51	5	3	0	26	Two spells										
1386	Paul Crook	2018	2019	Stand-off, Hooker	12	1	52	0	108											
1113	Dean Cross	1999	2001	Wing	11	7	0	0	28											
946	Trevor Croston	1988–89	1989–90		20	2	0	0	8											
1311	Josh Crowley	2013	2014	Second-row	48	20	0	1	81											
251	E. "Harry" Crowther	1926–27	1926–27		1	0	0	0	0											
652	Geoffrey Crowther	1962–63	1966–67	Centre	25	5	0	0	15											
198	James Culhane	1920–21	1922–23		4	1	0	0	3											
948	Shane Cummins	1988–89	1988–89		1	0	0	0	0											
561	James Cunliffe	1950–51	1950–51		1	0	0	0	0											
326	Samuel Cunliffe	1935–36	1939–40		14	0	0	0	0											
1399	Jonah Cunningham	2018	2018		3	5	0	0	20											
1296	Samuel Cunningham	2012	2012		2	0	0	0	0											
687	Brian Curry	1966–67	1968–69		53	3	145	0 ^²	299											
371	Harry Dagnan	1940–41	1943–44		23	5	0	0	15											
717	Arthur Daley	1968–69	1974–75		59	4	0	0	12											
542	Frank Daley	1948–49	1958–59		209	35	0	0	105											
1281	Jamie Dallimore	2011	2013	Stand-off, Scrum-half	31	15	91	1	243											
1070	Richard Darkes	1998	1999		31	7	8	0	44											
172	Frank Darlington	1918–19	1918–19		3	0	0	0	0											
1331	Alex Davidson	2014	2014	Prop, Second-row	7	1	0	0	4											
1024	Paul Davidson	1994–95	1997	Second-row, Centre	65	17	0	1	69											
558	Alan Davies	1950–51	1961–62	Centre	391	174	1	0 ^²	524	replaced by Alan Walsh, a Rochdale Hornets player, who represented a combined Oldham & Rochdale Hornets team against New Zealand in the 1961 New Zealand rugby league tour of Great Britain and France match at Watersheddings, Oldham on Monday 4 September 1961.										
1372	Ben Davies	2017	2020	Prop	48	2	0	0	8											
145	D. 'B'. David Davies	1912–13	1920–21	Prop, Second-row, Loose forward, Hooker	103	12	0	0	36											
140	Evan Davies	1911–12	1925–26	Centre	321	102	1	0 ^²	308											
45	F. W. Davies	1897–98	1898–99		35	7	0	0	21											
506	J. Davies	1945–46	1945–46		1	0	0	0	0											
47	Thomas D. Davies	1898–99	1900–01		71	60	1	0 ^²	182											
698	Thomas Davies	1967–68	1973–74		161	28	5	0 ^²	94											
312	Ceidriog Davies	1934–35	1939–40		152	29	0	0	87											
194	Jack Dawson	1919–20	1920–21		9	0	1	0 ^²	2											
73	James Dawson	1901–02	1901–02		3	0	0	0	0											
557	Bryn Day	1950–51	1952–53	Prop, Loose forward	75	3	1	0 ^²	11											
1050	Paul Deacon	1997	1997	Stand-off, Scrum-half	4	0	0	0	0											
826	Peter Deakin	1978–79	1978–79	Second-row	4	0	0	0	0											
1172	Craig Dean	2006	2006		6	0	0	0	0											
393	John Dean	1941–42	1949–50 ^¹		75	0	0	0	0	Two spells										
124	Sid Deane	1908–09	1911–12	Centre, Five-eighth	103	35	0	0	105											
670	Bill Delooze	1964–65	1967–68		5	0	0	0	0											
1346	Tom Dempsey	2015	?		8	2	2	1	13											
415	Joe Desborough	1942–43	1942–43		1	0	0	0	0											
990	Sean Devine	1992–93	1992–93	Scrum-half, Stand-off	10	6	6	1	37											
1400	Jordan Dezaria	2018	2018	Loose forward, Prop, Second-row	1	1	0	0	4	Loan from Leigh Centurions										
1358	Tyler Dickinson	2016	2017	Prop	23	0	0	0	0	Two loan spells from Huddersfield Giants										
702	Colin Dickman	1967–68	1969–70		5	0	0	0	0											
1067	Craig Diggle	1998	1998		3	2	0	0	8											
1268	Michael Diveney	2011	2011	Scrum-half	10	4	33	0	82											
66	C. E. Dixon	1901–02	1901–02		6	0	6	0 ^²	12											
196	George Dixon	1920–21	1920–21		5	0	0	0	0	is this George Dixon?										
383	Harry Dixon	1941–42	1941–42		6	0	0	0	0											
897	Paul Dixon	1984–85	1984–85	Prop, Second-row	5	1	0	0	4											
90	Billy Dixon	1903–04	1911–12	Stand-off, Scrum-half, Centre	261	58	5	0 ^²	184	Debut on 3 Sep 1903 v Hull FC										
114	Birdie Dixon	1906–07	1912–13		67	16	3	0 ^²	54											
860	Stephen Dobb	1980–81	1982–83	Wing	8	0	0	0	0											
276	Hubert Dobbs	1930–31	1930–31		10	3	0	0	9											
1108	Gavin Dodd	1999	2005	Fullback, Wing	129	60	0	1	241											
685	Terry Dolly	1965–66	1967–68		49	12	0	0	36											
961	Austin Donegan	1990–91	1991–92	Prop	27	4	0	0	16	Debut on 9 Sep 1990 v Leeds RLFC										
537	John Donegan	1948–49	1949–50		24	0	0	0	0											
190	Jerry Donovan	1919–20	1923–24		69	7	2	0 ^²	25											
654	John Donovan	1962–63	1968–69	Stand-off	167	33	2	0 ^²	103											
1107	Lee Doran	1999	2004	Second-row	112	30	0	0	120											
596	Jack Doughty	1955–56	1955–56		1	0	0	0	0											
507	Vincent Doughty	1946–47	1946–47		16	5	0	0	15											
1478	Jacob Douglas	2023	2023		1	0	0	0	0	On loan from Wigan Warriors										
294	Tom Dover	1932–33	1932–33		4	0	0	0	0											
335	Michael Downey	1937–38	1943–44		107	32	39	0 ^²	174											
960	Ronnie Duane	1990–91	1990–91	Centre, Second-row	21	1	0	0	4											
177	Robert Duff	1918–19	1918–19		1	0	0	0	0											
602	Roger Dufty	1957–58	1961–62		124	18	0	0	54											
700	Joe Dunn	1967–68	1970–71		10	0	0	0	0											
1430	Tyler Dupree	2021	2021	Prop	18	10	0	0	40	Debut on 20 Mar 2021 v Barrow Raiders										
473	Harold Dyer	1944–45	1944–45		1	0	0	0	0											
660	Frank Dyson	1963–64	1964–65	Fullback	60	7	206	0 ^²	433											
16	Harry Eagland	1895–96	1896–97	Fullback	55	0	17	0 ^²	46	Also RFU pre-1895? During his time at Oldham he scored seventeen goals. All goals worth 2-points apart from seasons 1895–96 season and 1896–97 season when conversions were worth 2-points, penalty goals 3-points and drop goals 4-points.										
1383	Dave Eccleston	2018	2018		20	5	0	0	20											
1061	Christopher Eckersley	1998	1998		21	15	0	0	60											
440	Joseph Eckersley	1943–44	1944–45		17	0	0	0	0											
162	A. E. P. "Alf" Edwards	1914–15	1914–15		23	2	0	0	6											
899	Jeff Edwards	1985–86	1987–88	Fullback	33	2	1	0	10											
597	John H. Edwards	1955–56	1958–59		7	0	0	0	0											
547	John Edwards	1948–49	1948–49		1	0	0	0	0											
1036	Michael Edwards	1995–96	1998 ^¹	Wing	22	6	0	0	24	Two spells										
4	R. "Bob" Edwards	1895–96	1898–99		97	7	0	0	21	also RFU pre-1895?										
982	Logan Edwards	1991–92	1991–92	Centre, Second-row, Loose forward	14	5	0	0	20											
418	Joe Egan	1942–43	1942–43	Hooker	1	0	0	0	0											
288	Tom Egan	1932–33	1934–35	Stand-off	25	2	0	0	6											
1369	Tuoyo Egodo	2017	2017	Wing, Centre, Second-row	10	2	0	0	8	Loan from Castleford Tigers										
649	Michael Elliott	1962–63	1978–79	Wing	446	153	0	0	459	Debut on 27 Oct 1962 v Wakefield Trinity										
486	… Ellis	1945–46	1945–46		1	0	0	0	0											
38	Herbert Ellis	1897–98	1897–98		234	4	0	0	12											
1486	Jamie Ellis	2023	present	Scrum-half, Stand-off, Hooker	11	2	35	0	78	Debut on 3 Sep 2023 v Doncaster RLFC										
1255	David Ellison	2010	2012	Prop	63	12	0	0	48											
350	Fred Elson	1938–39	1942–43		54	5	0	0	15											
1148	Martin Elswood	2004	2005		33	4	0	0	16											
573	Lionel Emmitt	1952–53	1953–54	Wing	36	21	0	0	63											
269	Harry Entwistle	1929–30	1932–33		91	3	0	0	9											
25	Enos Etchells	1895–96	1897–98		51	1	0	0	3	also RFU pre-1895?										
585	John Etty	1954–55	1958–59	Wing, Centre	150	90	0	0	270											
1304	Niall Evalds	2013	2013	Fullback	1	1	0	0	4											
453	Albert Evans	1943–44	1943–44		2	0	0	0	0											
157	George Evans	1913–14	1919–20		30	7	0	0	21											
512	Selwyn Evans	1946–47	1948–49		26	7	0	0	21											
979	Joseph Faimalo	1991–92	1997 ^¹	Second-row	91	14	0	0	56	Two spells										
324	William Fairbairn	1935–36	1936–37		16	6	0	0	18											
937	John Fairbank	1988–89	1990–91		52	11	0	0	44											
1349	Jacob Fairbank	2015	2015	Loose forward, Prop, Second-row	1	1	0	0	4	Loan from Huddersfield Giants										
921	Mark Fairbank	1986–87	1986–87		2	0	0	0	0											
234	Samuel Fairfax	1924–25	1925–26		14	4	0	0	12											
657	Brian Fallon	1962–63	1962–63		8	0	7	0 ^²	14											
429	… Fallowfield	1942–43	1942–43		1	0	0	0	0											
142	Bill Farnsworth	1912–13	1919–20	Five-eighth, Stand-off	93	7	0	0	21											
147	Viv Farnsworth	1912–13	1914–15	Centre	78	27	1	0 ^²	83											
1497	Owen Farnworth	2024	present	Prop, Loose forward	9	3	0	0	12	Debut on 10 Feb 2024 v Barrow Raiders										
201	Reginald Farrar	1920–21	1930–31		143	114	47	0 ^²	436											
1114	Christopher Farrell	2000	2001		26	2	0	0	8											
760	John Farrell	1972–73	1974–75		59	4	0	0	12											
1084	Michael Farrell	1999	1999		15	6	1	0	26											
1110	Phil Farrell	1999	2006 ^¹	Second-row, Loose forward	125	30	0	0	120	Two spells										
1150	Craig Farrimond	2004	2005		10	1	0	0	4											
1048	Vince Fawcett	1997	1997	Wing, Centre, Stand-off, Loose forward	9	3	0	0	12											
577	Peter Fearis	1953–54	1954–55		7	4	1	0 ^²	14											
552	Albert Fearnley	1949–50	1950–51	Second-row, Hooker	29	5	0	0	15											
574	John Feather	1952–53	1954–55		48	10	1	0 ^²	32											
165	Hallam Fenton	1918–19	1918–19		1	0	0	0	0											
435	D Ferguson	1943–44	1943–44		12	0	0	0	0											
54	Joe Ferguson	1899–1900	1922–23	Fullback, Prop, Second-row, Hooker	627	58	540	0 ^²	1,254	Debut on 9 Sep 1899 v Millom R.L.F.C.										
1102	Peter Ferris	1999	2000	Centre	5	1	0	0	4											
1450	Ethan Ferry	2022	2023	Second-row	18	1	0	0	4	Debut on 30 Jan 2022 v Lock Lane ARLFC										
821	James Fiddler	1978–79	1979–80		19	1	31	3	68											
1469	Oli Field	2022	2022	Second-row	8	2	0	0	8	Debut on 17 Jul 2022 v Doncaster RLFC										
952	John Fieldhouse	1989–90	1990–91	Prop, Second-row	61	7	0	0	28											
1313	Adam Files	2013	2016	Hooker	28	17	0	0	68	On loan from Salford City Reds in 2013, then signed permanently										
20	George Fillingham	1895–96	1896–97		2	0	0	0	0	also RFU pre-1895?										
909	David Finch	1985–86	1985–86	Wing, Centre, Second-row, Loose forward	3	0	0	0	0											
183	James Finnerty	1919–20	1923–24	Centre	128	60	0	0	180	Debut on 23 Aug 1919 v Warrington RLFC										
204	James Fisher	1920–21	1925–26	Loose forward	38	3	0	0	9											
650	Raymond Fisher	1962–63	1962–63		15	1	0	0	3											
175	Thomas Fitton	1918–19	1920–21	Wing	33	9	0	0	27											
1104	Kevin Fitzpatrick	1999	2000		1	0	0	0	0											
816	Eric Fitzsimmons	1978–79	1980–81	Wing	46	11	127	0	287											
483	John Flanagan	1945–46	1945–46		6	0	0	0	0											
830	Terry Flanagan	1979–80	1988–89	Hooker, Loose forward	281	42	1	2	147	during his time at Oldham he scored twenty-five 3-point tries and seventeen 4-point tries.										
480	Bill Flanagan	1944–45	1945–46		31	1	0	0	3											
490	Joseph Flanagan	1945–46	1945–46		2	0	0	0	0											
693	Kevin Flanagan	1967–68	1978–79 ^¹		78	8	13	0 ^²	50	Two spells										
950	Neil Flanagan	1988–89	1998 ^¹		52	8	0	2	34	Two spells										
1068	Andrew Fleming	1998	1998		2	0	0	0	0											
339	Ken Fleming	1938–39	1938–39		13	3	0	0	9											
678	Geoffrey Fletcher	1965–66	1968–69		111	13	1	0 ^²	41											
267	J. Fletcher	1928–29	1929–30		10	1	0	0	3											
1421	Matthew Fletcher	2020	2021	Second-row	14	1	0	0	4	Debut on 2 Feb 2020 v Widnes Vikings										
722	Raymond Fletcher	1969–70	1970–71		25	0	0	0	0											
50	Thomas Fletcher	1898–99	1905–06 ^¹	Centre	100	31	3	0 ^²	99	Two spells										
1465	Nyle Flynn	2022	2022	Prop	5	1	0	0	4	Debut on 15 May 2022 v North Wales Crusaders										
1274	Matthew Fogarty	2011	2012	Centre	21	12	0	0	48											
1253	Michael Fogerty	2010	2011	Centre	29	20	0	0	80											
248	Ernest Foote	1926–27	1933–34		64	5	1	0 ^²	17											
1278	Carl Forber	2011	2017	Scrum-half, Stand-off, Loose forward	14	5	63	0	146											
1461	Tom Forber	2022	2023	Hooker	4	1	0	0	4	Two stints, 3 apps in 2022 & 1 app in 2023, on loan from Wigan Warriors										
1307	Jon Ford	2013	2014	Centre	30	34	0	0	136	is this Johnathon Ford?										
934	Mike Ford	1987–88	2001 ^¹	Scrum-half	157	37	1	13	163	Two spells										
1221	Byron Ford	2007	2007	Wing	10	12	0	0	48	Debut on 19 Aug 2007 v Workington Town										
148	Ernest Forshaw	1912–13	1918–19		19	0	0	0	0											
282	Thomas Forshaw	1931–32	1936–37		31	14	0	0	42											
805	Alan Forster	1977–78	1980–81	Prop	42	2	0	0	6											
676	Colin Forsyth	1964–65	1964–65	Prop	1	0	0	0	0											
1126	David Foster	2001	2002	Centre, Hooker, Second-row	6	5	0	0	20											
750	Frank Foster	1971–72	1972–73	Loose forward	47	2	25	0 ^²	56											
176	J. Foster	1918–19	1918–19		5	0	0	0	0											
1364	Lewis Foster	2016	2016	Scrum-half, Stand-off, Hooker	7	1	0	0	4	Loan from Leigh Centurions										
828	G Fox	1978–79	1978–79		0	0	0	0	0											
1301	Rob Foxen	2012	2012		4	0	0	0	0											
869	Des Foy	1982–83	1990–91	Wing, Centre, Stand-off	197	96	0	0	380	At Oldham he scored four 3-point tries & ninety-two 4-point tries.										
894	Martin Foy	1984–85	1984–85		3	0	0	0	0											
962	Norman Francis	1990–91	1990–91	Wing	16	4	0	0	16	Debut on 26 Sep 1990 v Castleford										
829	Bill Francis	1979–80	1980–81	Centre, Stand-off	49	4	0	0	12											
1088	Stuart Fraser	1999	1999		2	0	0	0	0											
34	George Frater	1896–97	1904–05	Loose forward, Prop, Second-row, Hooker	262	6	28	0 ^²	74											
146	Bernard Frederick	1912–13	1912–13	Loose forward, Prop, Second-row, Hooker	9	0	0	0	0											
813	David Fricker	1978–79	1978–79		12	0	0	0	0											
801	Peter Frodsham	1977–78	1978–79		28	4	0	0	12											
472	Wilfred Frost	1944–45	1948–49		69	0	0	0	0											
422	J Fuller	1942–43	1942–43		1	0	0	0	0											
9	Tom Furniss	1895–96	1897–98		56	3	0	0	9	also RFU pre-1895?										
1485	Andy Gabriel	2023	2023		1	0	0	0	0											
454	George Gabriel	1943–44	1943–44		2	0	0	0	0											
764	Bob Gaitley	1973–74	1973–74		6	0	0	0	0											
1502	Brad Gallagher	2024	present	Second-row	2	0	0	0	0	Debut on 17 Mar 2024 v Workington Town										
566	W. Bernard Ganley	1950–51	1960–61	Fullback	341	15	1,358	0 ^²	2,761	Debut on 3 Mar 1951 v Liverpool Stanley										
724	Daniel Gardiner	1969–70	1969–70	Prop, Second-row	24	1	0	0	3											
81	Arthur Gardner	1902–03	1904–05		10	3	0	0	9											
379	Joseph Gardner	1940–41	1944–45		31	1	0	0	3											
317	Arthur Garnett	1935–36	1941–42		46	1	0	0	3											
725	Terry Garrett	1969–70	1971–72		42	7	100	0 ^²	221											
1023	Steve Gartland	1994–95	1996		30	3	24	2	62											
488	… Garvey	1945–46	1945–46		1	0	0	0	0											
283	J. Gaskell	1931–32	1931–32		4	0	0	0	0											
647	James Gaskell	1962–63	1965–66	Scrum-half	34	4	0	0	12											
417	Ken Gee	1942–43	1942–43	Prop	1	0	0	0	0											
1310	Sam Gee	2013	2014	Centre, Loose forward	38	5	4	0	28											
1094	Anthony Gibbons	1999	2002	Centre, Scrum-half	88	36	0	1	145											
1096	David Gibbons	1999	2004 ^¹	Centre, Stand-off, Scrum-half	96	37	0	0	148	Two spells										
1243	Stevie Gibbons	2009	2009	Hooker	7	3	0	0	12											
997	Walter Gibson	1992–93	1995–96		111	37	0	2	150											
939	Ashley Gilbert	1988–89	1988–89	Loose forward, Second-row	8	4	0	0	16											
1273	Liam Gilchrist	2011	2013	Prop	42	3	0	0	12											
1033	Ian Gildart	1995–96	1997	Prop	57	0	0	0	0											
1366	Kieran Gill	2016	2018	Centre	24	15	0	0	60	Three separate loan spells										
1254	John Gillam	2010	2012	Wing	37	25	0	0	100											
546	Gerry Gilmore	1948–49	1949–50		17	2	0	0	6											
290	Alex Givvons	1932–33	1948–49 ^¹	Scrum-half, Loose forward	241	54	0	0	162	Two spells										
515	Harry Glanville	1946–47	1949–50		20	1	25	0 ^²	53											
1161	Tere Glassie	2005	2005	Prop, Second-row, Loose forward	23	6	0	0	24											
397	Charles Glover	1941–42	1941–42		1	0	0	0	0											
628	David Goddard	1959–60	1960–61		4	0	0	0	0											
609	Peter Goddard	1958–59	1962–63	Prop	74	8	0	0	24											
1121	Jon Goddard	2001	2005	Fullback, Centre	111	35	0	0	140											
1049	Brett Goldspink	1997	1997	Prop	21	1	0	0	4											
548	Bryn Goldswain	1949–50	1955–56	Second-row	228	21	142	0 ^²	347											
565	Herbert Goodfellow	1950–51	1951–52	Scrum-half	23	2	0	0	6											
84	Harry Goodman	1902–03	1903–04	Scrum-half	9	2	0	0	6	Debut on 18 Oct 1902 v Widnes RLFC										
842	Andy Goodway	1979–80	1993–94 ^¹	Prop, Second-row	136	31	0	0	113	Two spells during his time at Oldham he scored eleven 3-point tries and twenty 4-point tries.										
1051	Luke Goodwin	1997	1997	Fullback	26	10	24	2	90											
767	Neil Goodwin	1973–74	1973–74		6	0	0	0	0											
1219	Ian Gordon	2007	2007		5	0	0	0	0											
262	Jack Gore	1928–29	1931–32	Loose forward	21	2	0	0	6											
1166	Andrew Gorey	2005	2007		40	15	0	0	60											
756	Terry Gorman	1972–73	1973–74		10	1	1	0 ^²	5											
1181	Dean Gorton	2006	2006	Second-row	23	6	0	0	24											
1019	Alfie Gouldbourne	1993–94	1994–95		2	0	0	0	0											
1229	Thomas Goulden	2008	2009	Second-row	53	26	0	0	104											
907	Malcolm Graham	1985–86	1987–88 ^¹	Second-row, Centre, Wing	65	37	0	0	148	Two spells										
304	William Graham	1933–34	1933–34		1	0	0	0	0											
623	Thomas Gray	1959–60	1959–60		6	0	0	0	0											
1000	Joseph Graziano	1992–93	1992–93		8	1	0	0	4											
1433	Callum Green	2021	2021	Fullback	7	1	6	0	16	Debut on 28 Mar 2021 v Swinton Lions										
167	Edwin Green	1918–19	1918–19		5	0	0	0	0											
310	James Green	1934–35	1936–37		40	2	0	0	6											
1011	Iyan Green	1993–94	1995–96		38	5	0	0	20											
327	William Greenall	1935–36	1936–37		30	7	0	0	21											
1237	Lee Greenwood	2009	2009	Wing, Centre	21	12	0	0	48											
341	T. Greenwood	1938–39	1942–43		18	0	0	0	0											
1408	Jamie Greenwood	2019	2019		11	1	0	0	4	Debut 24 Feb 2019 v Whitehaven RLFC										
1285	Miles Greenwood	2012	2012	Fullback	25	20	0	0	80											
774	Brian Gregory	1973–74	1974–75	Second-row, Loose forward	29	5	0	0	15											
1429	Declan Gregory	2021	2021	Second-row, Hooker	16	0	0	0	0	Debut on 20 Mar 2021 v Barrow Raiders										
1401	Nick Gregson	2018	2019	Prop	3	0	0	0	0	Two loan spells from Leigh Centurions										
75	Robert Grey	1901–02	1901–02		10	0	0	0	0											
321	Billy Griffiths	1935–36	1947–48		101	2	104	0 ^²	214											
491	Stanley Griffiths	1945–46	1945–46		11	0	0	0	0											
975	Joseph Grima	1991–92	1991–92	Hooker	3	0	0	0	0											
396	… Grimes	1941–42	1941–42		1	0	0	0	0											
211	Tom Grimes	1921–22	1924–25		31	7	0	0	21											
1354	Danny Grimshaw	2016	2019	Centre, Scrum-half	41	10	0	0	40	Two spells										
113	Arthur Groves	1906–07	1912–13		10	1	0	0	3											
139	J. H. Groves	1911–12	1911–12		2	0	0	0	0											
1010	Paul Groves	1993–94	1993–94	Hooker	6	2	0	0	8											
449	Frank Grundy	1943–44	1945–46		6	0	0	0	0											
1228	Tommy Grundy	2008	2009	Second-row, Loose forward	13	1	0	0	4											
1054	Daniel Guest	1997	2006 ^¹		107	3	0	0	12	Two spells										
995	Hugh Gumbs	1992–93	1992–93		15	6	0	0	24											
495	George Gummer	1945–46	1946–47	Centre	42	16	2	0 ^²	52											
1046	Reece Guy	1996	1996		8	0	0	0	0											
1407	Titus Gwaze	2019	2020	Prop	18	1	0	0	4	Two loan spells from Wakefield Trinity										
838	Kenneth Gwilliam	1979–80	1980–81	Scrum-half	33	6	0	1	19											
1174	Alan Hadcroft	2006	2006	Centre	8	0	0	0	0											
1326	Matthew Haggarty	2013	2013		9	1	0	0	4											
330	Ian Hague	1936–37	1945–46		13	4	0	0	12	Two spells										
759	Fred Hall	1972–73	1979–80		191	13	5	4	53											
328	Frederick Hall	1936–37	1939–40		80	29	0	0	87											
915	Martin Hall	1986–87	1988–89	Hooker	10	2	0	0	8											
152	Billy Hall	1913–14	1924–25	Centre, Stand-off	240	53	2	0 ^²	163											
206	A. Hallett	1920–21	1920–21		1	0	0	0	0											
1224	Danny Halliwell	2008	2009	Centre, Second-row	51	28	20	0	152											
757	Albert Halsall	1972–73	1972–73	Prop, Second-row	4	1	0	0	3											
104	W. Ham	1905–06	1905–06		15	0	0	0	0											
195	Fred Hamer	1919–20	1920–21		2	0	0	0	0											
192	Jack Hamer	1919–20	1924–25		11	0	0	0	0											
784	John Hammond	1975–76	1975–76		4	0	0	0	0											
850	Tony Handforth	1980–81	1980–81	Hooker	7	0	0	0	0											
280	Tom Hanley	1931–32	1935–36		35	2	0	0	6											
410	Albert Harris	1942–43	1944–45		4	1	0	0	3											
497	Norman Harris	1945–46	1948–49	Centre, Fullback	119	35	7	0 ^²	119											
857	Billy Harris	1980–81	1981–82	Prop	20	0	0	0	0											
29	F. Harrison	1895–96	1895–96		1	0	0	0	0	also RFU pre-1895?										
398	Thomas Harrison	1941–42	1941–42		1	2	0	0	6											
445	… Hartley	1943–44	1943–44		1	0	0	0	0											
1435	Joe Hartley	2021	2023	Centre	35	11	0	0	44	Debut on 24 Apr 2021 v London Broncos										
605	Brian Hatherall	1958–59	1960–61		16	0	0	0	0											
268	Reginald Hathway	1928–29	1932–33	Second-row, Loose forward	129	25	0	0	75											
1164	Simon Haughton	2005	2005	Second-row	14	7	0	0	28											
818	Colin Hawkyard	1978–79	1988–89	Wing, Centre, Prop, Second-row	189	32	0	0	118	during his time at Oldham he scored ten 3-point tries and twenty-two 4-point tries.										
1402	Ritchie Hawkyard	2019	2019	Fullback, Scrum-half	22	12	0	0	48											
1180	Gareth Hayes	2006	2006	Prop	24	1	0	0	4											
1093	Joey Hayes	1999	2002	Wing	51	28	0	0	112											
619	Gordon Haynes	1959–60	1959–60	Loose forward	11	0	0	0	0											
382	Jack Hearne	1940–41	1940–41		1	0	0	0	0											
406	… Heaton	1942–43	1942–43		1	0	0	0	0											
1249	Ben Heaton	2009	2021	Centre, Wing, Second-row, Fullback	54	23	0	0	92	Two separate spells; 1st debut on 26 Jul 2009 v Dewbury Rams										
129	Thomas Helm	1909–10	1910–11	Prop, Second-row, Hooker, Loose forward	43	6	0	0	18											
1119	Bryan Henare	2000	2002	Second-row	44	14	0	0	56											
941	John Henderson	1988–89	1991–92		68	30	0	0	120											
783	Steve Herbert	1974–75	1981–82	Prop, Second-row	139	27	7	0	95											
484	Frank Herd	1945–46	1945–46		16	5	0	0	15											
226	George Hesketh	1923–24	1929–30	Stand-off, Loose forward, Scrum-half	194	31	61	0 ^²	215											
1004	Nigel Heslop	1992–93	1994–95	Wing	36	10	0	0	40											
1347	Dave Hewitt	2015	2022	Scrum-half, Stand-off	130	43	94	0	362	Three separate spells, 1st debut on 27 Jun 2015 v Gloucestershire All Golds										
518	Patrick Hewson	1947–48	1948–49		9	1	0	0	3											
545	Frank Heyes	1948–49	1950–51		59	14	1	0 ^²	44											
300	James Heywood	1933–34	1943–44 ^¹		25	3	0	0	9	Two spells										
712	Raymond Hicks	1968–69	1976–77		39	2	0	0	6											
461	Fred Higginbottom	1944–45	1944–45		22	6	0	0	18											
999	John Higgins	1992–93	1992–93		1	0	0	0	0											
220	Lawrence Higgins	1922–23	1928–29	Fullback	45	7	5	0 ^²	31											
235	Alfred Higgs	1925–26	1929–30	Centre	140	37	0	0	111											
765	Kenneth Highton	1973–74	1973–74		1	0	0	0	0											
1241	Paul Highton	2009	2009	Prop	14	1	0	0	4											
1375	Brad Hill	2017	2017		2	0	0	0	0											
794	David Hill	1976–77	1977–78	Stand-off, Centre	12	0	0	0	0											
653	Edward Hill	1962–63	1962–63		5	1	0	0	3											
1029	Howard Hill	1994–95	1997		50	9	0	0	36	Two spells										
667	Jack Hill	1964–65	1967–68		20	1	0	0	3											
739	Clifford Hill	1970–71	1972–73		59	9	0	0	27											
286	John Hilton	1932–33	1932–33		7	0	0	0	0											
158	Herman Hilton	1913–14	1925–26	Prop, Second-row, Loose forward	253	40	1	0 ^²	122											
72	James Hings	1901–02	1901–02		1	0	0	0	0											
1477	George Hirst	2023	2023	Second-row	19	4	0	0	16	Debut on 5 Mar 2023 v London Skolars										
896	David Hobbs	1984–85	1986–87	Second-row	60	11	108	5	265											
1312	Mark Hobson	2013	2014	Loose forward	27	1	0	0	4											
264	Edward Hodgkinson	1928–29	1931–32		42	8	0	0	24											
744	Norman Hodgkinson	1971–72	1972–73		64	32	0	0	96											
1124	Thomas Hodgkinson	2001	2002		2	0	0	0	0											
232	P. D. Hodgson	1924–25	1924–25		2	0	0	0	0											
295	E. "Ted" Hodgson	1933–34	1934–35		28	1	0	0	3											
305	J. Hodgson	1933–34	1933–34		1	0	0	0	0											
338	W. John Hodkisson	1937–38	1941–42		21	7	0	0	21											
1167	Ian Hodson	2005	2010 ^¹	Second-row, Loose forward	87	14	0	0	56	Two spells										
865	Brian Hogan	1981–82	1982–83	Prop	34	3	0	0	9											
832	Michael Hogan	1979–80	1979–80		4	0	0	0	0											
426	… Hogg	1942–43	1942–43		1	0	0	0	0											
144	Frank Holbrook	1912–13	1918–19		67	35	9	0 ^²	123											
1434	Ben Holcroft	2021	2022	Wing	20	4	0	0	16	Debut on 2 Apr 2021 v Swinton Lions										
631	Keith Holden	1960–61	1962–63	Centre	62	31	0	0	93											
1008	Martin Holden	1993–94	1993–94		2	0	0	0	0											
968	Neil Holding	1991–92	1991–92	Stand-off, Scrum-half	4	0	1	0	2											
1101	Christopher Holland	1999	2000		18	0	0	0	0											
154	David Holland	1913–14	1920–21	Prop, Second-row, Loose forward	81	19	0	0	57											
775	Ian Holland	1973–74	1974–75		28	7	22	0 ^²	65											
243	Tom Holliday	1926–27	1928–29	Fullback, Wing	83	33	0	0	99											
180	J. Hollingworth	1918–19	1918–19		2	0	0	0	0											
1337	Jack Holmes	2016	2019	Fullback, Centre	69	32	0	0	128	Two separate spells										
789	Phil Holmes	1976–77	1976–77		1	0	0	0	0											
1295	Graham Holroyd	2012	2012	Stand-off	5	0	6	0	12											
688	Peter Holroyd	1966–67	1967–68		33	2	0	0	6											
1298	Christopher Holroyde	2012	2012		2	0	4	0	8											
322	Norman Holt	1935–36	1942–43		45	11	0	0	33											
1381	Luke Hooley	2017	2017	Fullback	22	10	25	0	90	Debut on 6 Aug 2017 v Sheffield Eagles										
1314	Will Hope	2013	2016	Loose forward, Second-row	26	5	0	0	20	Two separate spells										
718	Raymond Hopwood	1968–69	1969–70		5	0	0	0	0											
880	James Hornby	1983–84	1984–85		35	5	0	0	20											
414	William Horne	1942–43	1942–43		2	0	1	0 ^²	2											
1170	Christopher Hough	2005	2006		25	3	8	2	30											
1055	John Hough	1998	2007	Hooker	228	53	0	0	212											
474	… Houghton	1944–45	1944–45		1	0	0	0	0											
271	Joe Houghton	1929–30	1933–34		111	28	1	0 ^²	86											
1200	Drew Houston	2007	2007	Centre	25	6	0	0	24											
460	… Howard	1944–45	1944–45		4	0	0	0	0											
323	William F. Howard	1935–36	1936–37		19	0	0	0	0											
376	… Howarth	1940–41	1940–41		1	0	0	0	0											
407	F. Howarth	1942–43	1942–43		2	0	0	0	0											
665	Ian Howarth	1964–65	1967–68		13	0	0	0	0											
1203	Simeon Hoyle	2007	2008	Hooker	50	7	0	0	28											
1214	Adam Hughes	2007	2007	Centre, Wing	16	22	12	0	112											
695	Arthur Hughes	1967–68	1968–69		50	6	0	0	18											
770	Brian Hughes	1973–74	1978–79		104	3	7	0 ^²	23											
11	E. Hughes	1895–96	1897–98		44	0	0	0	0	also RFU pre-1895?										
1320	Kenny Hughes	2013	2014	Hooker	40	13	0	0	52											
254	Fred Humble	1927–28	1927–28		2	0	0	0	0											
840	Clive Hunter	1979–80	1981–82	Centre	46	15	0	0	45											
7	Jack Hurst	1895–96	1898–99	Wing	80	62	7	0 ^²	204	Also RFU pre-1895? During his time at Oldham he scored seven goals. All goals worth 2-points apart from seasons 1895–96 season and 1896–97 season when conversions were worth 2-points, penalty goals 3-points and drop goals 4-points.										
216	Thomas Hurtley	1922–23	1926–27		30	3	0	0	9											
1423	John Hutchings	2020	2020	Wing	2	0	0	0	0	Debut on 8 Feb 2020 v Widnes Vikings										
60	Viv Huzzey	1900–01	1902–03	Wing	40	21	6	0 ^²	75	twenty-one 3-point tries, and six 2-point goals equates to 75-points, not the 95-points shown in the reference.										
943	Gary Hyde	1988–89	1990–91	Centre	42	10	32	0	104											
1239	Jamie I'anson	2009	2010		31	3	0	0	12											
1420	Daniel Igbinedion	2020	2020	Prop, Second-row	1	0	0	0	0	Debut on 2 Feb 2020 v Widnes Vikings										
1424	Ryan Ince	2020	2021	Wing	22	3	0	0	12	Debut on 1 Mar 2020 v Bradford Bulls										
502	Stan Inglesfield	1945–46	1948–49		87	38	5	0 ^²	124											
108	Sam Irvin	1905–06	1908–09		37	1	0	0	3											
924	Richard Irving	1987–88	1991–92		95	31	0	0	124											
672	Robert "Bob" Irving	1964–65	1973–74	Second-row	296	80	0	0	240											
336	Wilson Irving	1937–38	1943–44		7	0	0	0	0											
1137	Chris Irwin	2003	2003	Wing	12	4	0	0	16											
1015	Shaun Irwin	1993–94	1996	Centre, Second-row	51	15	0	0	60											
1269	Andrew Isherwood	2011	2011		17	6	0	0	24											
1076	Emerson Jackman	1998	1999	Stand-off	34	6	0	0	24											
442	… Jackson	1943–44	1943–44		3	1	0	0	3											
876	Tony Jackson	1982–83	1982–83	Centre	1	0	0	0	0											
752	Keith Jackson	1971–72	1978–79		41	0	0	0	0											
554	Kenneth Jackson	1949–50	1960–61	Prop	243	24	0	0	72											
428	Vincent Jackson	1942–43	1942–43		1	0	0	0	0											
443	… Jamieson	1943–44	1943–44		1	0	0	0	0											
83	John James	1902–03	1902–03	Centre	8	0	0	0	0											
265	William James	1928–29	1928–29	Wing	3	1	0	0	3	Debut on 29 Dec 1928 v Widnes RLFC										
92	Adam Jardine	1903–04	1907–08		67	3	0	0	9											
121	Billy Jardine	1908–09	1914–15		164	26	60	0 ^²	198											
584	Alan Jarman	1954–55	1957–58		17	4	0	0	12											
804	Tony Jeff	1977–78	1977–78		2	0	0	0	0											
587	Robert Jennings	1954–55	1954–55		1	1	0	0	3											
245	Ivor Jeremiah	1926–27	1927–28		19	2	0	0	6											
802	Peter Jewitt	1977–78	1978–79		30	5	0	0	15											
1441	Brad Jinks	2021	2022	Hooker	11	1	0	0	4	Debut on 18 Aug 2021 v Sheffield Eagles										
448	… Johnson	1943–44	1943–44		1	0	0	0	0											
239	Abe Johnson	1925–26	1929–30	Stand-off	146	62	158	0 ^²	502											
1288	Bruce Johnson	2012	2012		8	1	0	0	4											
1120	Gavin Johnson	2000	2004		21	1	0	0	4											
1489	Jack Johnson	2024	present	Wing, Fullback	5	1	0	0	4	Debut on 10 Feb 2024 v Barrow Raiders										
1340	Josh Johnson	2015	2015	Prop	4	2	0	0	8	Dual-reg with Huddersfield Giants										
645	Kenneth Johnson	1961–62	1962–63		5	0	0	0	0											
1385	Kryan Johnson	2018	2021	Wing	35	12	4	0	56	Debut on 18 Feb 2018 v Whitehaven RLFC										
1356	Liam Johnson	2016	2016	Second-row, Loose forward, Centre	14	4	0	0	16	Loan from Huddersfield Giants										
1143	Nick Johnson	2003	2005	Wing	60	41	0	0	164											
370	Stan Jolley	1940–41	1940–41		1	0	0	0	0											
419	… Jones	1942–43	1942–43		1	0	0	0	0											
1390	Adam Jones	2018	2018		16	0	0	0	0											
576	Alan Jones	1952–53	1962–63		21	4	2	0 ^²	16											
980	Brett Jones	1991–92	1991–92		1	0	0	0	0											
1195	Carl Jones	2006	2006		6	0	0	0	0											
823	Clive Jones	1978–79	1978–79	Loose forward	4	0	0	0	0											
1013	David Jones	1993–94	1997 ^¹	Wing	69	16	0	0	64	Two spells										
430	F. Jones	1943–44	1943–44		2	1	0	0	3											
457	Harry Jones	1943–44	1943–44		1	0	0	0	0											
160	J. B. "Bedwelty" Jones	1913–14	1914–15		10	6	0	0	18											
252	J. G. "Glyn" Jones	1927–28	1927–28		1	1	0	0	3	Is this Glyn Jones?										
408	J.R. Jones	1942–43	1942–43		3	0	0	0	0											
996	Paul Jones	1992–93	1992–93		7	0	0	0	0											
285	R. B. Jones	1932–33	1934–35		12	0	0	0	0											
197	Reginald Jones	1920–21	1930–31	Scrum-half	72	10	0	0	30											
156	Thomas O. Jones	1913–14	1914–15		46	19	1	0 ^²	59											
525	W. G. "Glan" Jones	1948–49	1948–49		26	1	0	0	3											
522	W. J. "Johnny" Jones	1947–48	1947–48		2	0	0	0	0	is this Johnny Jones?										
872	Walter Jones	1982–83	1986–87	Prop, Second-row	104	3	0	0	11	during his time at Oldham he scored one 3-point tries and two 4-point tries.										
1403	Aaron Jones-Bishop	2019	2020		6	3	0	0	12											
1227	Phil Joseph	2008	2009	Hooker, Loose forward	55	16	1	0	66											
1303	Phil Joy	2012	2021	Prop	166	27	0	0	108	Debut on 2 Sep 2012 v Gateshead Thunder										
1345	Richard Joy	2015	2015	Prop	6	2	0	0	8	Debut on 12 Apr 2015 v Coventry Bears										
958	Christopher Joynt	1989–90	1991–92	Loose forward, Second-row, Prop	28	10	0	0	40											
325	James Jupp	1935–36	1935–36		6	0	0	0	0											
762	Andrew Kavanagh	1972–73	1973–74		4	0	0	0	0											
1416	Declan Kay	2019	2020	Wing	10	1	0	0	4	Debut on 18 Aug 2019 v Doncaster RLFC										
95	George Kaye	1903–04	1903–04		1	0	0	0	0											
786	Barry Kear	1975–76	1976–77		40	2	0	0	6											
551	Jack Keith	1949–50	1959–60	Hooker	342	63	0	0	189	Debut on 15 Oct 1949 v Wigan RLFC										
586	Alan Kellett	1954–55	1971–72 ^¹	Stand-off, Loose forward	206	76	6	0 ^²	240	Two spells										
93	James Kelley	1903–04	1904–05		40	0	0	0	0											
399	J. Kelly	1942–43	1942–43		1	0	0	0	0											
607	Geoffrey Kelly	1958–59	1958–59		11	1	0	0	3											
219	Joseph Kendall	1922–23	1924–25		16	6	0	0	18											
346	Vince Kenny	1939–40	1948–49		84	24	0	0	72											
635	Vince Kenny	1961–62	1966–67		14	8	0	0	24											
1190	Kenneth Kerr	2006	2006		1	0	0	0	0											
1242	Wayne Kerr	2009	2010	Prop	51	10	0	0	40											
998	Steve Kerry	1992–93	1993–94		43	9	94	6	230											
732	Alex Kersey-Brown	1969–70	1969–70	Centre, Wing	3	0	0	0	0	Debut on 27 Mar 1970 v Swinton on loan from Huddersfield RLFC										
88	Asa Kershaw	1902–03	1903–04		6	0	0	0	0											
683	David Kershaw	1965–66	1965–66		1	0	0	0	0											
291	Harold Kershaw	1932–33	1936–37		16	1	0	0	3											
1396	Lee Kershaw	2018	2019	Wing	28	16	0	0	64	Three separate loan spells from Wakefield Trinity										
352	Edward Kerwick	1939–40	1946–47	Centre, Stand-off	44	9	0	0	27											
1483	Samy Kibula	2023	2023	Prop	4	1	0	0	4											
1193	Thomas Kilgannon	2006	2006		9	3	0	0	12											
257	Bill Kilpatrick	1927–28	1931–32	Second-row	52	0	0	0	0	Debut on 26 Nov 1927 v St Helens										
494	John King	1945–46	1946–47		17	2	8	0 ^²	22	is this John King?										
1428	Liam Kirk	2021	2021	Prop, Loose forward	16	2	0	0	8	Debut on 20 Mar 2021 v Barrow Raiders										
1163	Jamie Kirkland	2005	2006	Hooker	22	0	0	0	0											
841	Paddy Kirwan	1979–80	1987–88	Scrum-half	151	33	0	0	116	during his time at Oldham he scored sixteen 3-point tries and seventeen 4-point tries. birth registered second ¼ 1961 (age 64–65) in Oldham district										
205	Ernest Knapman	1920–21	1926–27	Fullback	206	7	124	0 ^²	269											
795	Glen Knight	1976–77	1977–78		10	3	0	2	11											
26	Harry Knott	1895–96	1896–97		11	1	0	0	3	also RFU pre-1895?										
1123	Simon Knox	2001	2002	Prop, Second-row	3	0	0	0	0	Debut on 16 Dec 2001 v Hull KR										
1491	Craig Kopczak	2024	present	Prop, Second-row	7	0	0	0	0	Debut on 10 Feb 2024 v Barrow Raiders										
1012	Mike Kuiti	1993–94	1994–95	Second-row, Loose forward	69	11	0	0	44											
1115	Darryl Lacey	2000	2002	Wing	27	6	0	0	24											
402	Alan Laird	1942–43	1945–46		76	7	1	0 ^²	23											
356	Fred Lamb	1940–41	1944–45		22	3	0	0	9											
15	Duncan G. Lamonby	1895–96	1895–96		2	0	0	0	0	also RFU pre-1895?										
189	Tom Lancashire	1919–20	1920–21	Scrum-half	3	0	2	0 ^²	4	Debut on 19 Nov 1919 v Leeds RLFC										
1198	Gareth Langley	2007	2008	Wing	51	18	43	0	158											
1302	Danny Langtree	2012	2014	Second-row	48	23	0	0	92											
1388	Ryan Lannon	2018	2018	Loose forward, Second-row	2	0	0	0	0	Loan from Salford Red Devils										
705	Phil Larder	1968–69	1980–81	Centre, Wing	328	111	475	0 ^²	1283											
345	Ernest Large	1939–40	1947–48		108	49	0	0	147											
1503	Phoenix Laulu-Togaga'e	2024	present	Fullback, Wing	2	3	0	0	12	On season-long loan from Hull KR										
603	Lou Laverty	1957–58	1957–58		1	0	0	0	0											
1405	Scott Law	2019	2019	Prop	26	2	0	0	8	Debut on 17 Feb 2019 v Workington Town										
404	J. Lawrenson	1942–43	1942–43		1	0	0	0	0											
1495	Adam Lawton	2024	present	Second-row, Prop	9	5	0	0	20	Debut on 10 Feb 2024 v Barrow Raiders										
1252	Craig Lawton	2009	2009		5	0	0	0	0											
21	Joseph Lawton	1895–96	1904–05		192	52	1	0 ^²	158	also RFU pre-1895?										
536	E. Lea	1948–49	1948–49		2	1	0	0	3											
1341	Mick Learmonth	2015	2015		2	2	0	0	8											
1370	Scott Leatherbarrow	2017	2017	Stand-off, Scrum-half, Hooker	26	1	65	0	134											
1413	Cameron Leeming	2019	2020	Centre	14	5	0	0	20	Debut on 23 Jun 2019 v Workington Town										
1359	Kruise Leeming	2016	2016	Hooker	4	0	0	0	0	Loan from Huddersfield Giants										
1	Arthur Lees	1895–96	1906–07	Stand-off, Scrum-half	356	56	3	0 ^²	174	also RFU pre-1895?										
357	Frank Lees	1940–41	1946–47		116	44	0	0	132											
18	Joseph Lees	1895–96	1899–1900		118	4	0	0	12	also RFU pre-1895?										
478	Herbert Lees	1944–45	1944–45		6	0	3	0 ^²	6											
3	Samuel Lees	1895–96	1901–02		166	32	151	0 ^²	408	also RFU pre-1895? during his time at Oldham he scored one hundred and fifty-one goals. All goals worth 2-points apart from seasons 1895–96 season and 1896–97 season when conversions were worth 2-points, penalty goals 3-points and drop goals 4-points.										
63	Samuel Lees Jr.	1900–01	1904–05		55	9	15	0 ^²	57											
714	Brian Lennigan	1968–69	1968–69		1	0	0	0	0											
1308	Richard Lepori	2013	2017	Fullback	68	28	1	0	114	Two spells										
1039	Afi Leuila	1995–96	1999	Wing, Centre	77	21	0	0	84											
117	C. H. Lewis	1907–08	1907–08		1	0	0	0	0											
91	D. J. "David" Lewis	1903–04	1905–06	Scrum-half, Wing	26	5	0	0	15	Debut on 5 Sep 1903 v Hull FC										
1085	David Lewis	1999	1999		1	0	0	0	0											
274	Leslie Lewis	1930–31	1935–36		175	57	0	0	171											
955	Peter Lewis	1989–90	1989–90		2	1	0	0	4											
244	Arthur Leyland	1926–27	1929–30		35	1	0	0	3											
535	Thomas Leyland	1948–49	1953–54	Second-row	111	15	2	0 ^²	49	Debut on 9 Oct 1948 v Wakefield Trinity										
707	Thomas Leyland	1968–69	1970–71	Wing	3	0	0	0	0	Debut on 12 Oct 1968 v Featherstone Rovers										
908	David Liddiard	1985–86	1985–86	Fullback, Wing, Centre	15	12	0	0	48	Debut on 13 Oct 1985 v Salford										
910	Glen Liddiard	1985–86	1993–94 ^¹	Fullback, Five-eighth, Centre, Wing	32	8	4	1	41	Two spells; 1st debut on 15 Dec 1985 v Dewsbury										
1350	Elliott Liku	2015	2015		4	2	0	0	8											
1017	R. "Bob" Lindner	1993–94	1993–94	Loose forward, Second-row	30	10	0	0	40	Head-coach 1994										
1191	Danny Lingairi-Badham	2006	2006		1	0	0	0	0											
392	George Lister	1941–42	1941–42		2	0	0	0	0											
233	Bert Lister	1924–25	1930–31		57	1	0	0	3											
200	George Litherland	1920–21	1920–21		13	1	0	0	3											
571	Sidney Little	1951–52	1958–59	Prop, Second-row	249	49	0	0	147	Debut on 23 Feb 1952 v Barrow										
1199	Craig Littler	2007	2010	Centre	53	17	0	0	68											
853	Steve Littler	1980–81	1984–85	Fullback	25	0	0	0	0											
161	George Liversedge	1913–14	1914–15		26	0	0	0	0											
115	Thomas Llewellyn	1907–08	1911–12	Centre	123	28	1	0 ^²	86											
610	Kevin Lloyd	1958–59	1962–63		9	0	0	0	0											
109	Harry Locke	1905–06	1906–07		10	0	0	0	0											
845	Brian Lockwood	1980–81	1980–81	Prop, Second-row	15	2	0	0	6											
136	James Lomas	1910–11	1912–13	Wing, Centre	80	38	37	0 ^²	188											
578	Harold Lomas	1953–54	1958–59		23	8	0	0	24											
1151	James Lomax	2004	2006		1	0	0	0	0	Debut on 21 Mar 2004 v Chorley Lynx										
964	Simon Longstaff	1990–91	1991–92		11	1	0	0	4											
103	William "Billy" Longworth	1904–05	1912–13	Second-row, Prop	146	18	0	0	54											
621	Brian Lord	1959–60	1963–64	Centre	88	40	0	0	120											
1025	Gary Lord	1994–95	1997	Prop, Second-row	93	11	0	0	44	Debut on 21 Aug 1994 v Rochdale Hornets										
922	Paul Lord	1986–87	1991–92	Wing	93	53	0	0	212	Debut on 17 Apr 1987 v Salford										
944	Mark Lord	1988–89	1988–89		3	0	0	0	0											
337	Ken Lowe	1937–38	1944–45		70	5	0	0	15											
463	W. "Billy" Lowe	1944–45	1944–45		1	0	0	0	0											
106	W. C. Lowe	1905–06	1906–07		11	0	0	0	0											
867	Paul Lowndes	1981–82	1986–87		42	3	0	0	12	during his time at Oldham he scored three 4-point tries.										
782	Steve Lund	1974–75	1979–80		90	23	0	0	69											
31	John Lyons	1895–96	1895–96	Prop	6	0	0	0	0	Also RFU pre-1895										
438	J. Mackendray	1943–44	1943–44		1	0	0	0	0											
319	Graham Macrae	1935–36	1938–39		89	26	0	0	78											
682	Dennis Maders	1965–66	1969–70		18	0	0	0	0											
1410	Harry Maders	2019	2019		10	7	0	0	28											
1064	Martin Maders	1998	1999		17	0	0	0	0											
511	Joseph Mahoney	1946–47	1948–49	Centre	67	14	0	0	42	Debut on 14 Dec 1946 v Keighley										
181	… Mair	1918–19	1918–19		1	0	0	0	0											
655	Harry Major	1962–63	1965–66		66	3	0	0	9											
1476	Harvey Makin	2023	2023		2	1	0	0	4	On loan from Wigan Warriors										
459	Austin Malone	1943–44	1943–44		1	0	0	0	0											
1032	Francis Maloney	1995–96	1997	Stand-off, Scrum-half	65	21	153	3	393											
349	M. J. Maloney	1938–39	1939–40		9	1	0	0	3											
1100	Kevin Mannion	1999	2001	Loose forward	53	10	0	0	40											
284	Archie Mansfield	1931–32	1931–32		2	1	0	0	3											
1263	Scott Mansfield	2010	2011		5	0	0	0	0											
354	Arthur Mansley	1939–40	1939–40		3	0	0	0	0											
858	John Mantle	1980–81	1980–81	Prop	1	0	0	0	0											
401	Alf Marklew	1942–43	1942–43		1	0	0	0	0											
159	Rothwell Marlor	1913–14	1927–28	Prop, Second-row	264	32	2	0 ^²	100	Debut on 23 Mar 1914 v Wakefield Trinity										
287	Samuel Marner	1932–33	1932–33		2	0	0	0	0											
572	John Marre	1952–53	1952–53		1	0	0	0	0											
1318	Callum Marriott	2013	2013		7	0	0	0	0											
898	Bob Marsden	1984–85	1988–89		9	0	0	0	0											
299	Fred Marsh	1933–34	1945–46		48	10	0	0	30											
1132	Iain Marsh	2003	2004	Centre, Second-row	41	16	0	0	64											
1144	Lee Marsh	2003	2004	Loose forward	31	15	20	1	101											
1028	Wilson Marsh	1994–95	1994–95		14	3	44	1	101											
1235	James Martin	2008	2008	Second-row	2	0	0	0	0	Debut on 10 Aug 2008, on loan from Huddersfield Giants										
1394	Joe Martin	2018	2018	Fullback	2	2	0	0	8											
28	Thomas Martin	1895–96	1899–1900		100	58	0	0	174	also RFU pre-1895?										
1069	Michael Martindale	1998	1999		26	7	0	0	28											
833	Raymond Martland	1979–80	1980–81	Hooker	37	3	0	0	9											
954	Tommy Martyn	1989–90	1991–92	Stand-off	78	36	85	13	327											
501	… Mason	1945–46	1945–46		1	0	0	0	0											
1325	Nathan Mason	2013	2014	Prop	19	4	0	0	16	Four separate loan spells from Huddersfield Giants										
1162	Carlos Mataora	2005	2005		24	3	0	0	12											
318	Harry Matthews	1935–36	1942–43		39	6	0	0	18											
957	John Maxwell	1989–90	1992–93		8	1	0	0	4											
1173	Christopher Maye	2006	2006	Wing	18	3	0	0	12											
779	John Maye	1973–74	1974–75		5	0	0	0	0											
902	Hussein M'Barki	1985–86	1986–87	Wing, Fullback, Centre	60	12	0	0	48											
933	Charles McAlister	1987–88	1993–94 ^¹	Wing	129	33	63	0	258	Two spells										
456	… McArthur	1943–44	1943–44		1	0	0	0	0											
130	Tom McCabe	1909–10	1912–13		85	10	0	0	30	Australian rugby league footballer on the 1908–09 Kangaroo tour of Great Britain										
930	Bryan McCarthy	1987–88	1987–88	Wing	17	10	0	0	40											
1391	Zach McComb	2018	2019	Centre, Wing	42	27	0	0	108	Debut on 25 Feb 2018 v Featherstone Rovers										
751	Michael McCone	1971–72	1977–78		118	27	0	0	81											
663	James McCormack	1964–65	1971–72	Centre	165	32	0	0	96											
353	Stan McCormick	1939–40	1941–42	Wing	2	0	0	0	0											
559	Roland McCormick	1950–51	1950–51		1	0	0	0	0											
697	Charles McCourt	1967–68	1969–70		74	7	0	0	21											
788	Harold McCourt	1975–76	1975–76		2	0	0	0	0											
771	Bill McCracken	1973–74	1974–75		26	3	0	0	9											
377	Tommy McCue	1940–41	1943–44	Scrum-half	5	1	0	0	3											
1282	Mark McCully	2011	2012	Centre, Second-row	27	6	0	0	24											
864	Alan McCurrie	1981–82	1984–85	Hooker	120	21	0	4	77	during his time at Oldham he scored eleven 3-point tries and ten 4-point tries.										
23	Billy McCutcheon	1895–96	1897–98	Wing	34	8	0	0	24	also RFU pre-1895										
970	Barrie McDermott	1991–92	1993–94	Prop	40	6	0	0	24											
368	Hugh McDowell	1940–41	1940–41	Second-row, Prop	9	0	1	0 ^²	2	Debut on 16 Nov 1940 v Swinton as wartime guest player										
1145	Craig McDowell	2003	2003		4	0	0	0	0											
202	J. "Buddy" McEwan	1920–21	1920–21		7	1	0	0	3											
851	Ashley McEwen	1980–81	1982–83	Wing, Centre, Stand-off	61	16	0	0	48											
424	… McGill	1942–43	1942–43		1	0	0	0	0											
642	Bernard McGurrin	1961–62	1961–62	Loose forward	1	0	0	0	0	a Rochdale Hornets player, who represented a combined Oldham & Rochdale Hornets team against New Zealand in the 1961 New Zealand rugby league tour of Great Britain and France match at Watersheddings, Oldham on Monday 4 September 1961.										
1040	Andrew McIlwaine	1995–96	1995–96		1	0	0	0	0											
1363	Darnell McIntosh	2016	2017	Wing, Fullback	2	1	0	0	4	Loan from Huddersfield Giants										
611	Len McIntyre	1958–59	1965–66	Hooker	212	29	1	0 ^²	89											
594	Des McKeown	1955–56	1959–60		53	4	0	0	12											
403	E. McKeown	1942–43	1945–46		10	3	0	0	9											
1037	Christopher McKinney	1995–96	1997	Hooker	27	5	0	0	20	Debut on 27 Aug 1995 v Warrington										
99	Thomas McLean	1904–05	1910–11		90	37	0	0	111											
671	Stanley McLeod	1964–65	1966–67		70	21	0	0	63											
1135	Martin McLoughlin	2003	2004	Prop	51	3	0	0	12											
1109	Shayne McMenemy	1999	2001	Second-row	26	8	5	1	43											
277	Joe McNally	1930–31	1938–39		66	3	0	0	9											
1264	Gregg McNally	2010	2010	Fullback, Stand-off, Scrum-half	12	7	46	1	121											
1053	Joseph McNicholas	1997	2003	Wing	105	34	0	0	136											
710	Andrew Mead	1968–69	1968–69		1	0	0	0	0											
1057	Adrian Mead	1998	1999	Wing	50	13	0	0	52											
1474	Deane Meadows	2023	2023	Prop	19	1	0	0	4	Debut on 26 Feb 2023 v Doncaster RLFC										
992	Mark Meadows	1992–93	1993–94		16	2	0	0	8											
888	Kevin Meadows	1983–84	1989–90 ^¹	Centre	77	35	0	0	140	Two spells										
606	Len Mee	1958–59	1958–59		1	0	0	0	0											
171	John Melia	1918–19	1918–19		1	0	0	0	0											
1260	Benjamin Mellor	2010	2010		3	0	0	0	0											
1231	Luke Menzies	2008	2009	Prop	27	3	0	0	12											
466	… Mercer	1944–45	1944–45		1	0	0	0	0											
432	Ron Meredith	1943–44	1943–44		9	2	0	0	6	World War II guest at Huddersfield during the 1944–45 season										
6	James Merrill	1895–96	1898–99		83	5	0	0	15	also RFU pre-1895?										
1204	Richard Mervill	2007	2009	Prop	78	7	0	0	28											
150	Robert Metcalf	1912–13	1912–13		4	0	0	0	0											
741	Terry Michael	1970–71	1970–71		4	1	0	0	3											
1355	Gary Middlehurst	2016	2016	Second-row, Loose forward	24	4	0	0	16											
123	James Miller	1908–09	1908–09		5	9	0	0	27											
373	Harry Millington	1940–41	1940–41	Second-row, Loose forward	4	0	0	0	0											
39	Brierley Mills	1896–97	1896–97		2	0	0	0	0											
279	Clifford Mills	1931–32	1932–33	Wing	32	15	3	0 ^²	51	Debut on 29 Aug 1931 v Salford										
249	Norman Mills	1926–27	1926–27		1	0	0	0	0											
1169	Rob Mills	2005	2005		8	1	0	0	4											
1077	Laurent Minut	1999	1999	Fullback	19	2	10	0	28											
447	Jack Mitchell	1943–44	1943–44		2	2	0	0	6											
1022	Paddy Mitchell	1993–94	1993–94		4	1	0	0	4											
895	Patrick Mitchell	1984–85	1984–85		5	3	0	0	12											
351	Billy Mitchell	1938–39	1954–55	Centre	310	76	6	0 ^²	240	Debut on 10 Dec 1938 v Widnes RLFC										
601	Rowley Moat	1957–58	1957–58		6	2	0	0	6											
36	James Moffatt	1896–97	1900–01	Forward	96	4	0	0	12	Debut on 25 Dec 1896 v Stockport RFC										
1112	Steve Molloy	1999	2004 ^¹	Prop	86	5	0	1	21	Two spells Head coach 2004										
684	Michael Mooney	1965–66	1968–69		49	2	1	0 ^²	8											
1330	Paddy Mooney	2014	2014		7	1	0	0	4											
186	A. E. Moore	1919–20	1920–21		60	4	1	0 ^²	14											
76	C. Moore	1901–02	1901–02		10	0	0	0	0											
13	R. H. Moore	1895–96	1895–96		9	1	0	0	3	also RFU pre-1895?										
746	Samuel Moore	1971–72	1971–72		1	0	0	0	0											
334	Billy Moore	1937–38	1947–48		158	5	0	0	15											
41	Fred Moran	1897–98	1897–98		6	0	2	0 ^²	4											
1482	Pat Moran	2023	2023	Prop	19	1	0	0	4											
837	R. "Bob" Mordell	1979–80	1982–83	Second-row	73	10	0	0	30											
413	… Morgan	1942–43	1942–43		1	0	0	0	0											
1481	Bob Morgan	2023	2023	Prop	1	0	0	0	0	Signed from Almondbury Spartans on amateur forms										
1138	Dane Morgan	2003	2004	Prop, Second-row	55	16	0	0	64											
553	W. G. "Glyn" Morgan	1949–50	1949–50	Scrum-half	12	0	0	0	0	Debut on 26 Nov 1949 v Widnes										
1459	Kian Morgan	2022	2023	Fullback, Centre	38	20	0	0	80	Debut on 10 Apr 2022 v West Wales Raiders										
674	Lyn Morgan	1964–65	1964–65		1	0	0	0	0											
875	Michael Morgan	1982–83	1985–86	Prop	96	6	0	0	23	during his time at Oldham he scored one 3-point tries and five 4-point tries.										
510	R. A. "Ronald" Morgan	1946–47	1946–47		4	0	0	0	0											
1136	Christopher Morley	2003	2003	Prop, Second-row, Loose forward	27	4	0	0	16											
1382	Ben Morris	2017	2017	Centre, Second-row	5	1	0	0	4	Loan from St Helens										
1411	Frazer Morris	2019	2019	Prop	2	0	0	0	0	Loan from Halifax RLFC										
900	A. "Tony" Morrison	1985–86	1988–89	Second-row	20	0	0	0	0	Debut on 1 Sep 1985 v Halifax RLFC										
1220	Gareth Morton	2007	2007	Centre, Second-row	7	4	29	0	74											
1105	Tate Moseley	1999	2000	Second-row	3	1	0	0	4											
704	John Mullarkey	1968–69	1970–71		22	0	1	0 ^²	2											
978	Mark Mulligan	1991–92	1991–92		2	1	0	0	4											
620	Alfred Mumberson	1959–60	1966–67	Prop	92	8	0	0	24											
514	James Mundy	1946–47	1953–54		44	3	0	0	9											
1157	Damian Munro	2005	2008	Centre, Fullback, Wing	17	12	0	0	48	Debut on 13 Feb 2005 v Blackpool Panthers										
748	Geoff Munro	1971–72	1985–86	Wing	195	84	0	0	252											
1042	Matt Munro	1996	1997	Loose forward	37	8	0	0	32	Head coach 1997										
1449	Jason Muranka	2022	2022	Second-row	5	2	0	0	8	Debut on 30 Jan 2022 v Lock Lane ARLFC										
1287	Christopher Murphy	2012	2012		4	2	0	0	8											
412	Eddie Murphy	1942–43	1942–43		1	0	0	0	0											
690	Martin Murphy	1966–67	1981–82	Fullback	462	52	0	0	156											
569	Alf Murray	1951–52	1955–56		14	2	0	0	6											
1127	Anthony Murray	2002	2006	Hooker	10	1	0	0	4	Debut on 15 Mar 2002 v Sheffield Eagles										
1397	Daniel Murray	2018	2018	Prop	1	0	0	0	0	Loan from Salford Red Devils										
221	Jock Murray	1922–23	1924–25		15	3	0	0	9											
1261	Saqib Murtza	2010	2010		5	2	0	0	8											
932	Christopher Myler	1987–88	1987–88		2	0	0	0	0											
1034	Rob Myler	1995–96	1997	Centre	33	10	0	0	40											
1073	Joe Nadiole	1998	1999		22	1	0	0	4											
881	Tom Naidole	1983–84	1988–89		67	1	0	0	4											
122	Bill Nansen	1908–09	1909–10		28	2	0	0	6											
1152	Danny Nanyn	2004	2006		20	0	0	0	0											
1225	Mick Nanyn	2008	2008	Centre	32	21	139	0	362											
1103	Christopher Naylor	1999	2000		1	0	0	0	0											
313	Joseph Naylor	1934–35	1935–36		25	4	0	0	12											
1338	Adam Neal	2015	2018	Prop	63	6	0	0	24	Two separate spells										
1030	Michael Neal	1994–95	1997		28	6	0	0	24											
591	Roy Needham	1955–56	1959–60		5	5	0	0	15											
1389	Luke Nelmes	2018	2023	Prop	85	13	0	0	52	Debut on 18 Feb 2018 v Rochdale Hornets										
590	Vincent Nestor	1955–56	1964–65		232	86	0	0	258											
820	Tony Newell	1978–79	1978–79		7	4	0	0	12											
481	… Newman	1944–45	1944–45		1	1	0	0	3											
9999	… Newnes	1895–96	1895–96		1	0	0	0	0	also RFU pre-1895?										
1455	Dom Newton	2022	2023	Prop	21	2	0	0	8	Debut on 27 Mar 2022 v Keighley Cougars										
811	William "Bill" Newton	1978–79	1978–79		2	0	0	0	0											
1129	David Newton	2001	2002		2	0	0	0	0											
945	Keith Newton	1988–89	1991–92		69	14	0	0	56											
861	David Nicholson	1981–82	1982–83	Prop, Second-row	35	7	0	0	21											
564	Walter Nicholson	1950–51	1950–51	Wing	6	0	0	0	0	Debut on 3 Feb 1951 v Workington Town										
967	Vince Nicklin	1991–92	1991–92		34	8	0	0	32											
32	T. Nield	1895–96	1895–96		1	0	0	0	0	also RFU pre-1895?										
1280	Steven Nield	2011	2014	Fullback	26	8	2	0	36											
1437	Tom Nisbet	2021	2021	Fullback, Wing	1	0	0	0	0	Loan from St Helens										
583	John Noon	1954–55	1963–64	Centre, Stand-off	256	126	137	0 ^²	652											
1270	Paul Noone	2011	2012	Second-row	46	7	2	0	32											
1027	Paul Norman	1994–95	2005		26	3	0	0	12											
810	Colin North	1977–78	1978–79		6	0	8	1	17											
1116	Paul Norton	2000	2003	Prop	66	9	0	0	36											
1044	Anthony Nuttall	1996	1997	Prop	9	0	0	0	0											
340	Joseph Nutter	1938–39	1938–39		2	0	0	0	0											
1395	Levy Nzoungou	2018	2018	Prop	2	0	0	0	0	Loan from Salford Red Devils										
753	Christopher O'Brien	1972–73	1979–80	Fullback, Wing, Second-row	109	19	1	0 ^²	59	Debut on 28 Aug 1972 v York										
598	John O'Brien	1955–56	1959–60		5	4	0	0	12											
1197	Paul O'Connor	2006	2010	Fullback	108	53	8	0	228											
1467	Declan O'Donnell	2022	2022		2	0	0	0	0	Debut on 12 Jun 2022 v Midlands Hurricanes										
1488	Ben O'Keefe	2024	present	Wing, Centre	7	6	0	0	24	Debut on 10 Feb 2024 v Barrow Raiders										
901	John Ogburn	1985–86	1986–87		7	0	0	0	0											
859	A. "Tony" Ogden	1980–81	1985–86		17	0	0	0	0											
681	Alan Ogden	1965–66	1971–72	Second-row	63	4	0	0	12											
374	Arthur Ogden	1940–41	1943–44		3	1	0	0	3											
441	Bob Ogden	1943–44	1943–44	Scrum-half	7	0	0	0	0											
361	Harry Ogden	1940–41	1955–56	Prop	429	26	38	0 ^²	154	Debut on 5 Oct 1940 v Broughton Rangers										
814	Ian Ogden	1978–79	1980–81	Stand-off, Scrum-half	16	4	0	0	12											
1210	Mark Ogden	2007	2007	Stand-off	5	1	10	0	24											
622	Terry Ogden	1959–60	1962–63		7	0	0	0	0											
567	Terry O'Grady	1950–51	1956–57	Wing	140	105	0	0	315											
1332	Edwin Okanga-Ajwang	2014	2014		4	1	0	0	4											
112	Arthur Oldershaw	1906–07	1908–09		43	17	0	0	51											
173	William Oldham	1918–19	1918–19		4	0	0	0	0											
1209	Stuart Oldham	2007	2007		1	0	0	0	0											
137	Ernest Oliver	1911–12	1914–15		15	0	0	0	0											
993	Benjamin Olsen	1992–93	1993–94		29	4	0	0	16											
755	Roger O'Mahoney	1972–73	1981–82	Hooker	122	9	0	4	31	during his time at Oldham he scored four 1-point drop goals.										
852	Dennis O'Neill	1980–81	1981–82	Wing, Centre, Stand-off	31	7	0	0	21											
1212	Lucas Onyango	2007	2012	Wing	108	73	0	0	292											
1099	Thomas O'Reilly	1999	2000	Stand-off	9	1	0	0	4											
824	Kevin O'Rourke	1978–79	1978–79		2	0	0	0	0											
1468	Jonathan Openshaw	2022	2022		4	1	0	0	4	Debut on 10 Jul 2022 v Rochdale Hornets										
250	Jack Oster	1926–27	1931–32	Stand-off	189	67	6	0 ^²	213	Debut on 19 Feb 1927 v York										
938	Chris O'Sullivan	1988–89	1988–89	Stand-off	22	5	1	4	26	Debut on 18 Sep 1988 v Workington Town										
1377	Gene Ormsby	2017	2017	Wing	1	0	0	0	0	Loan from Huddersfield Giants										
475	A. N. Other	1944–45	1944–45		2	0	0	0	0											
487	A. N. Other	1945–46	1945–46		5	0	0	0	0											
731	A. N. Other	1969–70	1969–70		1	0	0	0	0											
831	A. N. Other	1979–80	1979–80		1	0	0	0	0											
866	A. N. Other	1981–82	1981–82		1	1	0	0	3											
893	A. N. Other	1984–85	1984–85		1	0	0	0	0											
919	A. N. Other	1986–87	1986–87		2	0	0	0	0											
940	A. N. Other	1988–89	1988–89		3	1	0	0	4											
9999	A. N. Other	2005	2005		1	0	0	0	0											
743	Gareth Owen	1971–72	1982–83	Prop	68	10	0	0	30											
1336	Gareth Owen	2014	2021	Hooker	155	16	0	0	64	Debut on 27 Jul 2014 v Hunslet Hawks										
56	Joseph Owens	1899–1900	1912–13	Centre, Wing	252	29	0	0	87	Debut on 17 Oct 1899 v Stockport RFC										
476	Ike Owens	1944–45	1944–45	Loose forward	2	0	0	0	0											
971	Richard Pachniuk	1991–92	1992–93		42	16	8	0	80											
1472	Jordan Paga	2023	2023	Stand-off, Scrum-half	21	17	0	0	68	Debut on 26 Feb 2023 v Doncaster RLFC										
1309	Lewis Palfrey	2013	2014	Stand-off	43	10	146	0	332											
311	Clifford J. Parker	1934–35	1934–35		1	0	0	0	0											
630	G. David Parker	1960–61	1967–68	Loose forward	198	34	0	0	102	Debut on 22 Oct 1960 v Widnes RLFC										
633	Peter Parker	1960–61	1961–62		2	0	0	0	0											
626	Thomas Parker	1959–60	1961–62	Loose forward, Second-row	21	1	0	0	3	Debut on 18 Apr 1960 v Whitehaven RLFC										
496	Walter Parkin	1945–46	1945–46		1	0	0	0	0											
151	James S. Parkinson	1913–14	1921–22		68	6	0	0	18											
348	F. Parr	1939–40	1941–42		41	7	0	0	21	Two separate spells										
641	James "Jim" Parr	1961–62	1961–62	Second-row	1	0	0	0	0	a Rochdale Hornets player, who represented a combined Oldham & Rochdale Hornets team against New Zealand in the 1961 New Zealand rugby league tour of Great Britain and France match at Watersheddings, Oldham on Monday 4 September 1961.										
1020	Chris Parr	1993–94	1995–96	Prop	30	0	0	0	0	Debut on 14 Nov 1993 v Runcorn Highfield RLFC										
848	Michael Parrish	1980–81	1985–86	Centre, Stand-off	191	37	563	3	1,256	during his time at Oldham he scored twenty-one 3-point tries and sixteen 4-point tries.										
332	Leslie Partridge	1936–37	1937–38		15	0	0	0	0											
1043	Andrew Patmore	1996	1996	Centre	13	3	0	0	12	Debut on 30 Mar 1996 v Wigan Warriors										
780	John Patterson	1974–75	1980–81	Stand-off	81	22	0	4	70											
935	Steve Patterson	1988–89	1988–89		3	0	0	0	0											
627	William "Bill" Patterson	1959–60	1964–65		72	29	12	0 ^²	111											
708	Kenneth Payne	1968–69	1969–70		15	0	0	0	0											
624	William "Bill" Payne	1959–60	1961–62	Prop	76	2	0	0	6											
222	… Peacock	1922–23	1922–23		2	0	0	0	0											
59	E. "Ted" Pearce	1900–01	1902–03		11	2	0	0	6											
98	Fred Pearce	1903–04	1903–04		4	0	0	0	0											
1376	Kameron Pearce-Paul	2017	2017	Centre, Wing	8	0	0	0	0	Loan from London Broncos										
470	Les Pearson	1944–45	1944–45	Wing	1	0	0	0	0	Wartime guest player; played one game v Bradford Northern on 14 Oct 1944										
617	Brian Pendlebury	1959–60	1959–60		3	0	0	0	0											
193	J. Pennington	1919–20	1919–20		3	0	0	0	0											
1081	Emmanuel Peralta	1999	1999	Second-row	26	0	0	0	0											
1142	Christopher Percival	2003	2006 ^¹	Centre	13	9	0	0	36	Two spells										
1082	Mark Perrett	1999	1999	Second-row	15	1	0	0	4											
768	A. "Tony" Peters	1973–74	1977–78		80	16	0	0	48											
925	Steve Peters	1987–88	1987–88		13	0	0	0	0											
616	John Petley	1959–60	1959–60		1	0	0	0	0											
77	Richard Petrie	1902–03	1902–03		1	0	0	0	0											
892	Christopher Phelan	1984–85	1984–85		11	0	0	0	0											
1007	Abraham Phillip	1992–93	1992–93		1	0	0	0	0											
479	Doug Phillips	1944–45	1946–47	Second-row	18	0	0	0	0											
228	Joseph Phillips	1923–24	1929–30	Wing	14	8	0	0	24											
14	Percy Phillips	1895–96	1895–96		4	0	0	0	0	also RFU pre-1895? Is this Percy Phillips?										
1005	Rowland Phillips	1992–93	1992–93	Second-row, Prop	9	1	0	0	4											
1431	Shaun Pick	2021	2021	Second-row	15	1	0	0	4	Debut on 20 Mar 2021 v Barrow Raiders										
367	… Pickford	1940–41	1941–42		13	0	0	0	0											
534	Jonathan Pilkington	1948–49	1948–49		9	0	0	0	0											
575	Frank Pitchford	1952–53	1962–63	Scrum-half	305	105	1	0 ^²	317	captain										
834	John Pitts	1979–80	1979–80		3	0	0	0	0											
847	Alan Platt	1980–81	1984–85	Centre, Second-row, Loose forward	76	9	13	2	58	during his time at Oldham he scored six 3-point tries and three 4-point tries.										
648	Don Platt	1962–63	1963–64	Loose forward	16	3	1	0 ^²	11	Debut on 20 Oct 1962 v Leeds RLFC										
942	Duncan Platt	1988–89	1991–92	Fullback	94	22	275	1	639	Debut on 4 Dec 1988 v Halifax RLFC										
524	Laurie Platt	1947–48	1953–54	Centre	128	64	0	0	192											
791	Gordon Pollard	1976–77	1981–82		23	0	18	0	36											
46	R. Porter	1897–98	1899–1900		28	0	0	0	0											
58	R. Potter	1900–01	1900–01		3	1	0	0	3											
1141	Dan Potter	2003	2003		4	2	0	0	8											
364	Stanley Powell	1940–41	1940–41	Fullback, Wing, Centre, Stand-off, Scrum-half	1	1	0	0	3											
458	… Prescott	1943–44	1943–44		1	0	0	0	0											
1059	Michael Prescott	1998	1999		29	2	0	0	8											
375	Thomas Preston	1940–41	1940–41		1	0	0	0	0											
253	C. W. Price	1927–28	1927–28		2	0	0	0	0											
644	Malcolm Price	1961–62	1964–65	Centre	23	14	0	0	42											
719	Steve Price	1969–70	1969–70		1	0	0	0	0											
1075	Andrew Proctor	1998	2002	Prop	65	4	0	0	16											
303	Norman Pugh	1933–34	1947–48	Second-row, Loose forward	363	39	1	0 ^²	119	Debut on 5 Mar 1934 v Wakefield Trinity										
613	R. "Bob" Pugsley	1958–59	1959–60		14	2	0	0	6											
632	Jack Pycroft	1960–61	1965–66		110	23	0	0	69											
959	Derek Pyke	1990–91	1990–91	Prop	5	0	0	0	0											
1062	Brian Quinlan	1998	1999		19	2	21	0	50											
608	Sean Quinlan	1958–59	1960–61	Wing	11	4	0	0	12	Debut on 22 Nov 1958 v Leeds RLFC										
431	… Radcliffe	1943–44	1943–44		5	0	0	0	0											
471	Bill Radcliffe	1944–45	1944–45		15	0	5	0 ^²	10											
800	Ian Radcliffe	1976–77	1978–79		22	4	0	0	12											
170	Herbert Radford	1918–19	1918–19		1	0	0	0	0											
634	John Rae	1960–61	1963–64		41	12	0	0	36	is this Johnny Rae?										
787	Terry Ramshaw	1975–76	1976–77	Prop, Second-row	33	1	0	0	3											
985	Scott Ranson	1991–92	1997	Wing	128	59	0	0	236											
913	Stuart Raper	1986–87	1986–87	Loose forward, Scrum-half	31	11	0	0	44											
1393	Danny Rasool	2018	2018		10	2	0	0	8											
556	Bill Ratchford	1950–51	1953–54	Fullback	51	3	31	0 ^²	71											
477	Kenneth Ratcliffe	1944–45	1944–45		5	2	0	0	6											
721	John Rativale	1969–70	1969–70		2	0	0	0	0											
1484	Nick Rawsthorne	2023	2023	Centre, Wing	10	10	0	0	40											
308	Steve Ray	1934–35	1935–36	Wing	18	8	0	0	24											
520	Joseph Rea	1947–48	1947–48		8	1	0	0	3											
240	Jack Read	1925–26	1939–40	Prop	463	16	1	0 ^²	50											
806	Tony Redford	1977–78	1977–78		3	1	0	0	3											
1185	Carl Redford	2006	2006		2	0	0	0	0											
1182	Michael Redford	2006	2006		8	1	0	0	4											
1297	Lewis Reed	2012	2012		4	1	0	0	4											
469	Dai Rees	1944–45	1947–48	Scrum-half	50	6	1	0 ^²	20											
306	Lewis Rees	1934–35	1944–45 ^¹	Prop	125	21	7	0 ^²	77	Two spells										
261	Thomas E. Rees	1928–29	1943–44 ^¹	Fullback	417	8	659	0 ^²	1,342	Two spells										
214	Thomas Rees	1921–22	1923–24		28	4	1	0 ^²	14											
48	Morgan Rees	1898–99	1898–99		4	0	0	0	0											
86	Sydney Rees	1902–03	1902–03		3	0	0	0	0											
1291	Jack Reid	2012	2012		1	0	0	0	0											
1384	Matt Reid	2018	2018	Centre	22	11	0	0	44	Debut 18 Feb 2018 v Whitehaven RLFC										
1432	Martyn Reilly	2021	2021	Loose forward, Second-row	21	6	0	0	24	Debut on 20 Mar 2021 v Barrow Raiders										
1240	Paul Reilly	2009	2010	Fullback, Wing	27	7	0	0	28	Debut on 13 Feb 2009 v Widnes Vikings										
1444	Owen Restall	2022	2022	Wing	22	21	0	0	84	Debut on 30 Jan 2022 v Lock Lane ARLFC										
266	Jack Reynolds	1928–29	1937–38		177	24	13	0 ^²	98											
737	James Reynolds	1970–71	1978–79		137	22	0	0	66											
30	Tom Rhodes	1895–96	1895–96		1	0	0	0	0	also RFU pre-1895?										
333	Verdun Rhydderch	1937–38	1945–46		62	12	0	0	36	Two spells										
1095	Pat Rich	1999	2004 ^¹	Wing, Centre	79	19	303	0	682	Two spells										
1014	Craig Richards	1993–94	1996		30	6	0	0	24											
1447	Martyn Ridyard	2022	2023	Stand-off, Scrum-half	39	3	165	1	343	Debut on 30 Jan 2022 v Lock Lane ARLFC										
1289	Thomas Rigby	2012	2012		1	0	0	0	0											
464	Peter Riley	1944–45	1944–45		6	0	0	0	0											
599	Bill Riley	1956–57	1956–57		2	0	0	0	0											
179	Sid Rix	1918–19	1931–32	Wing, Centre	330	155	4	0 ^²	473											
?	… Roberts	1942–43	1942–43		3	0	0	0	0											
1156	Mark Roberts	2004	2006	Second-row	31	3	0	0	12											
1426	Max Roberts	2021	2021	Second-row	23	4	0	0	16	Debut on 20 Mar 2021 v Barrow Raiders										
1339	Oliver Roberts	2015	2015	Second-row, Loose forward	8	2	0	0	8	Loan from Huddersfield Giants										
1218	Rob Roberts	2007	2009	Second-row, Loose forward	55	15	0	1	61											
153	Charlie Robeson	1913–14	1914–15		42	2	0	0	6											
1215	Adam Robinson	2007	2008	Prop, Second-row	35	5	0	0	20	Debut on 20 May 2007 v Barrow Border Raiders										
1329	Brett Robinson	2014	2014	Scrum-half	15	2	0	1	9											
1246	Craig Robinson	2009	2010	Second-row	29	3	0	0	12											
1066	Darren Robinson	1998	1998		8	2	0	0	8											
615	Geoffrey Robinson	1959–60	1964–65	Second-row	177	20	0	0	60											
444	James Robinson	1943–44	1944–45	Centre	4	0	0	0	0	Wartime guest										
237	Joseph Robinson	1925–26	1925–26		3	0	0	0	0											
1276	Shaun Robinson	2011	2012	Wing	27	11	0	0	44											
931	Steve Robinson	1987–88	1991–92		55	15	0	0	60											
1440	Lloyd Roby	2021	2021	Fullback, Wing	2	1	0	0	4	Debut on 8 Aug 2021 v Swinton Lions, on loan from Widnes Vikings										
1299	Colton Roche	2012	2012	Prop, Loose forward, Second-row	2	0	0	0	0											
1248	Martin Roden	2009	2012	Hooker	77	7	0	0	28											
1111	Neil Roden	1999	2013 ^¹	Stand-off, Scrum-half	295	113	0	25	477	Two spells										
588	Jack Rogers	1955–56	1956–57		40	8	53	0 ^²	130											
1442	Fenton Rogers	2021	2021	Prop	1	0	0	0	0	Debut on 15 Aug 2021 v Sheffield Eagles, on loan from Huddersfield Giants										
1098	Wes Rogers	1999	2007	Prop	20	1	0	0	4											
987	Iva Ropati	1991–92	1992–93	Centre	36	25	0	0	100											
1334	Steve Roper	2014	2016	Stand-off, Scrum-half	15	2	37	1	83											
1155	Jon Roper	2004	2004	Fullback, Wing, Centre, Stand-off, Loose forward	9	0	20	0	40											
57	… Roscoe	1900–01	1900–01		1	0	0	0	0											
503	… Rose	1945–46	1945–46		1	0	0	0	0											
452	Tommy Rostron	1943–44	1948–49	Loose forward	64	6	0	0	18											
926	Paul Round	1987–88	1999 ^¹	Prop, Second-row	151	56	0	0	224	Two spells 1987-91 & 1997-99										
168	George Rourke	1918–19	1918–19		2	0	0	0	0											
593	Ron Rowbottom	1955–56	1958–59		40	3	0	0	9											
936	Andrew Ruane	1988–89	1990–91		75	15	12	7	91											
314	Harold Rudd	1934–35	1934–35		1	0	0	0	0											
713	Fred Russell	1968–69	1970–71		28	3	0	0	9											
1052	Ian Russell	1997	1997	Loose forward, Second-row	6	1	0	0	4											
951	Richard Russell	1989–90	1992–93	Wing, Hooker	125	20	0	0	80	Debut on 3 Sep 1989 v Workington Town										
1250	Jamie Russo	2009	2009	Five-eighth, Second-row, Centre	5	3	0	0	12	Debut on 31 Jul 2009 v Rochdale Hornets										
785	Warren Ryans	1975–76	1978–79		6	0	0	0	0											
296	Ted Sadler	1933–34	1933–34	Loose forward, Second-row	25	6	0	0	18											
1091	James Salisbury	1999	1999		3	0	7	0	14											
1306	Daniel Samuel	2013	2013		5	0	0	0	0											
887	Ian Sanderson	1983–84	1989–90	Hooker	76	11	0	0	44											
1211	Lee Sanderson	2007	2007	Scrum-half	8	1	20	0	44											
1171	Andrew Sands	2005	2005		2	0	0	0	0											
433	… Saunders	1943–44	1943–44		1	0	0	0	0											
701	Clifford Sayer	1967–68	1971–72		45	3	0	0	9											
745	A. "Tony" Scahill	1971–72	1971–72		5	1	0	0	3											
247	Jack Scaife	1926–27	1934–35	Hooker	324	7	0	0	21	Debut on 16 Oct 1926 v Rochdale Hornets										
347	David Schofield	1938–39	1945–46		47	5	13	0 ^²	41											
855	Derrick Seabrook	1980–81	1980–81	Stand-off	1	0	0	0	0											
27	Thomas Sellars	1895–96	1904–05		40	0	0	0	0	also RFU pre-1895?										
182	Albert Senior	1918–19	1918–19		1	0	0	0	0											
1439	Louis Senior	2021	2021	Wing	1	1	0	0	4	On loan from Huddersfield Giants										
1232	Benjamin Seru	2008	2008	Wing	1	0	0	0	0											
358	… Shadford	1940–41	1940–41		1	0	0	0	0											
149	Daniel Shannon	1912–13	1913–14		8	0	0	0	0											
365	Thomas Shannon	1940–41	1940–41	Stand-off	8	3	0	0	9											
1140	Adam Sharples	2003	2006	Prop, Second-row	20	0	0	0	0	Debut on 2 Mar 2003 v Barrow Raiders										
423	John Shatz	1942–43	1942–43		5	0	0	0	0											
500	Doug Shaw	1945–46	1946–47		42	3	0	0	9											
1139	Darren Shaw	2003	2003	Second-row	13	0	0	0	0											
1058	Graeme Shaw	1998	2000	Loose forward	42	5	0	0	20											
991	Mark Sheals	1992–93	1992–93	Prop	32	5	0	0	20	Debut on 30 Aug 1992 v London Crusaders; Later became a TV actor										
529	Joe "Pop" Shearman	1948–49	1948–49		13	0	0	0	0											
691	Geoffrey Shelton	1966–67	1967–68		26	3	0	0	9											
9999	Jode Sheriffe	2021	2021	Prop	0	0	0	0	0	Played in just 2 friendlies v Featherstone Rovers on 6 Mar 2021 & Halifax Panthers on 13 Mar 2021										
885	Paul Sherman	1983–84	1987–88	Wing	42	10	0	0	40											
446	Eric Sherratt	1943–44	1943–44		4	0	0	0	0											
920	Ian Sherratt	1986–87	1996 ^¹		161	12	0	0	48	Two spells										
213	Robert Shore	1921–22	1921–22		1	0	0	0	0											
498	… Shuttleworth	1945–46	1945–46		1	0	0	0	0											
1092	Mark Sibson	1999	2002	Fullback	91	60	13	0	266											
749	Michael Siddall	1971–72	1974–75		22	4	0	0	12											
538	Joseph Silva	1948–49	1951–52		38	1	0	0	3											
637	Trevor Simms	1961–62	1968–69	Wing, Right wing	112	49	0	0	147	Previously at Rochdale Hornets who represented a combined Oldham & Rochdale Hornets team against New Zealand in the 1961 New Zealand rugby league tour of Great Britain and France match at Watersheddings, Oldham on Monday 4 Sep 1961.										
1360	Jared Simpson	2016	2016	Fullback	3	0	0	0	0											
604	Geoff Sims	1958–59	1965–66	Wing, Fullback	204	59	211	0 ^²	599											
882	Alan Sinclair	1983–84	1983–84		22	2	0	0	8											
1071	Ian Sinfield	1998	2007 ^¹	Second-row	93	5	0	0	20	Two spells										
1451	Sean Slater	2022	2023	Hooker	29	5	1	0	22	Debut on 30 Jan 2022 v Lock Lane ARLFC										
210	R. "Bob" Sloman	1921–22	1928–29	Second-row	268	40	4	0 ^²	128	Club captain										
643	Peter Smethurst	1961–62	1967–68	Second-row	190	39	2	0 ^²	121											
331	A. Raymond Smith	1936–37	1947–48		197	17	4	0 ^²	59											
105	Arthur Smith	1905–06	1913–14	Second-row, Prop	247	21	0	0	63											
696	Colin Smith	1967–68	1968–69		19	0	0	0	0											
1300	Daniel Smith	2012	2017	Prop, Loose forward	7	1	0	0	4	Two separate loan spells										
1414	Ed Smith	2019	2020		3	0	0	0	0											
118	George W. Smith	1907–08	1913–14	Wing, Centre, Second-row	173	100	5	0 ^²	310											
1292	Paul Smith	2012	2012	Second-row	17	6	0	0	24											
1045	Peter Smith	1996	1996		2	0	0	0	0											
612	Dick Smith	1958–59	1959–60		10	0	0	0	0											
582	Tipuna "Smut" Smith	1953–54	1954–55		20	0	0	0	0											
706	Ged Smith	1968–69	1971–72		65	5	0	0	15											
516	Jack Smith	1946–47	1946–47		4	0	0	0	0											
1201	Kris Smith	2007	2007	Loose forward	10	5	0	0	20											
994	M. D. "Tiny" Solomona	1992–93	1993–94		44	6	0	0	24											
1147	Paul Southern	2004	2004	Prop	22	1	0	0	4											
614	Ike Southward	1958–59	1960–61	Wing	52	54	0	0	162	Debut on 21 Mar 1959 v Barrow RLFC										
1443	Harvey Spence	2021	2021	Scrum-half	5	0	0	0	0	Debut on 22 Aug 2021 v Toulouse Olympique										
1352	Jack Spencer	2016	2021	Prop, Second-row	106	4	0	0	16	Debut on 7 Feb 2016 v London Broncos										
132	Joseph Spencer	1909–10	1909–10		2	0	0	0	0											
316	Stanley Spencer	1935–36	1935–36		23	5	0	0	15											
1362	Tom Spencer	2016	2016	Prop	4	0	0	0	0	Loan from Leigh Centurions										
523	Wilson Spencer	1947–48	1952–53		58	18	15	0 ^²	84											
65	Frank Spottiswoode	1901–02	1904–05	Wing	112	45	0	0	135	Debut on 14 Sep 1901 v Batley RLFC										
1226	Marcus St Hilaire	2008	2011	Fullback, Wing, Centre	86	31	0	0	124											
728	Colin Standing	1969–70	1969–70	Second-row	4	0	0	0	0											
781	Paul Starbuck	1974–75	1977–78		19	2	0	0	6											
734	Graham Starkey	1970–71	1971–72		14	5	16	0 ^²	47											
1130	Ryan Stazicker	2001	2003	Second-row	20	4	0	0	16											
1277	Luke Stenchion	2011	2012		20	2	0	0	8											
270	Jack Stephens	1929–30	1934–35	Centre	186	79	37	0 ^²	311											
1189	Simon Stephens	2006	2006		2	0	0	0	0											
388	… Stephenson	1941–42	1941–42		1	0	0	0	0											
988	David Stephenson	1991–92	1997	Fullback	59	5	0	0	20	Debut on 17 Apr 1992 v Rochdale Hornets										
207	Phillip Stephenson	1920–21	1920–21		11	1	0	0	3											
1047	Paul Stevens	1996	1996	Prop, Second-row	3	0	0	0	0	Debut on 4 Aug 1996 v Workington Town										
1222	Warren Stevens	2007	2008		11	0	0	0	0											
1006	Michael Stewart	1992–93	1992–93		2	1	0	0	4											
562	Frank Stirrup	1950–51	1959–60	Fullback, Wing, Stand-off, Scrum-half	224	49	8	0 ^²	163	Club captain										
798	Uri Stondin	1976–77	1978–79		31	7	85	0	191											
344	William Stott	1938–39	1944–45	Centre, Stand-off	81	22	144	0 ^²	354											
467	… Stottard	1944–45	1944–45		1	0	0	0	0											
1208	Michael Stout	2007	2007		4	1	0	0	4											
969	Tim Street	1991–92	1991–92		28	5	0	0	20											
1002	Martin Strett	1992–93	1993–94		13	1	19	0	42											
539	John Sugden	1948–49	1949–50		22	3	0	0	9											
844	Clive Sullivan	1980–81	1980–81	Wing, Centre	18	3	0	0	9											
662	A. Sutcliffe	1963–64	1963–64		1	0	0	0	0											
468	Clarence Sutcliffe	1944–45	1945–46		19	4	0	0	12											
1470	Alex Sutton	2022	2023	Centre, Fullback, Wing	6	6	0	0	24	On loan from Wigan Warriors										
1233	Luke Sutton	2008	2011		36	5	0	0	20											
1134	Simon Svabic	2003	2006	Stand-off, Scrum-half, Loose forward	95	20	116	4	316											
726	George Swanston	1969–70	1969–70		2	0	0	0	0											
1245	Gary Sykes	2009	2009	Hooker	19	3	0	0	12											
1293	Matty Syron	2012	2012		7	0	0	0	0											
1205	Said Tamghart	2007	2008	Second-row	63	7	0	0	28	Debut on 11 Feb 2007 v Rochdale Hornets										
531	Leslie Tate	1948–49	1948–49		26	4	5	0 ^²	22											
862	Alan Taylor	1981–82	1985–86	Fullback	75	15	0	0	47	during his time at Oldham he scored thirteen 3-point tries and two 4-point tries.										
293	Albert Taylor	1932–33	1940–41 ^¹	Centre	150	63	25	0 ^²	239	Two spells, 1st debut on 4 Feb 1933 v Broughton Rangers										
1496	Elijah Taylor	2024	present	Loose forward, Second-row, Hooker	5	0	0	0	0	Debut on 10 Feb 2024 v Barrow Raiders										
242	Horace Taylor	1925–26	1931–32	Loose forward, Second-row	5	0	0	0	0	Debut on 3 Apr 1926 v Barrow RLFC										
5	I. P. "Ike" Taylor	1895–96	1901–02	Centre	90	31	0	0	93	also RFU pre-1895?										
790	Ian Taylor	1976–77	1979–80	Prop	40	2	0	0	6	Debut on 19 Sep 1976 v Leigh										
362	Jack Taylor	1940–41	1950–51	Loose forward, Second-row	89	6	0	0	18	Debut on 5 Oct 1940 v Broughton Rangers										
37	Joseph Taylor	1896–97	1896–97	Centre	1	0	0	0	0	is this Joseph Taylor?										
658	Kevin Taylor	1962–63	1976–77	Hooker	429	60	5	0 ^²	190											
877	Michael Taylor	1982–83	1986–87	Wing	118	30	0	0	120	during his time at Oldham he scored thirty 4-point tries.										
891	Paul Taylor	1984–85	1988–89 ^¹	Stand-off, Loose forward	32	11	0	2	46	Two spells, 1st debut on 28 Oct 1984 v Featherstone Rovers										
178	Thomas Taylor	1918–19	1918–19	Scrum-half	4	1	0	0	3	Debut on 8 Mar 1919 v Barrow RLFC										
387	Friend Taylor	1941–42	1943–44	Fullback	27	5	2	0 ^²	19	Debut on 27 Sep 1941 v Castleford										
44	E. W. Telfer	1897–98	1901–02		117	6	1	0 ^²	20											
1026	Jason Temu	1994–95	1997	Prop	77	3	0	0	12											
85	A. Tetlow	1902–03	1902–03		17	0	0	0	0											
110	Joel Tetlow	1906–07	1918–19		10	3	1	0 ^²	11											
74	Dai Thomas	1901–02	1904–05	Second-row, Prop	61	1	0	0	3											
188	E. "Ned" Thomas	1919–20	1923–24	Wing	107	47	0	0	141											
258	Edgar Thomas	1927–28	1930–31		82	31	1	0 ^²	95											
508	Les Thomas	1946–47	1948–49	Second-row	58	19	17	0 ^²	91											
82	Phil Thomas	1902–03	1903–04	Centre	44	7	0	0	21											
43	Dickie Thomas	1897–98	1908–09	Fullback, Loose forward	363	9	19	0 ^²	65	Debut on 4 Sep 1897 v St Helens										
281	W. Trevor Thomas	1931–32	1941–42 ^¹	Second-row	129	17	2	0 ^²	55	Two spells										
96	William Thomas	1903–04	1903–04	Centre	9	1	0	0	3											
163	William Thomas	1914–15	1921–22		41	7	0	0	21											
342	Gwynne Thomas	1938–39	1944–45	Fullback	64	0	1	0 ^²	2											
1290	Alexander Thompson	2012	2012	Second-row	19	12	0	0	48											
174	Daniel Thompson	1918–19	1920–21		48	6	3	0 ^²	24											
309	T. Thompson	1934–35	1935–36		7	2	2	0 ^²	10											
1321	Liam Thompson	2013	2014	Second-row, Loose forward	27	2	0	0	8											
513	Norman Thompson	1946–47	1948–49	Prop	42	2	0	0	6	Debut on 22 Feb 1947 v Belle Vue Rangers										
1480	Iain Thornley	2023	2023	Centre, Wing	1	1	0	0	4	On dual-reg loan from Wigan Warriors										
1453	James Thornton	2022	2023	Second-row	22	6	0	0	24	Debut on 30 Jan 2022 v Lock Lane ARLFC										
570	Stephen Thurlow	1951–52	1951–52		9	0	0	0	0											
184	Maurice Tighe	1919–20	1922–23		97	20	40	0 ^²	140											
208	Alfred Tomkins	1921–22	1925–26		148	1	0	0	3											
521	Arthur Tomlinson	1947–48	1956–57		176	12	0	0	36											
526	Harold Tomlinson	1948–49	1950–51		51	1	0	0	3											
669	Terry Tomlinson	1964–65	1965–66	Fullback	3	0	5	0 ^²	10											
1213	Tony Tonks	2007	2007	Prop	20	3	0	0	12											
1168	David Tootill	2005	2012 ^¹	Prop, Second-row	5	1	0	0	4	Two spells										
64	Harry Topham	1901–02	1909–10		231	33	0	0	99											
903	David Topliss	1985–86	1986–87	Stand-off	49	9	0	0	36											
1009	Paul Topping	1993–94	1997	Second-row, Loose forward	115	15	136	0	332											
394	Idris Towill	1941–42	1941–42	Centre, Stand-off	1	0	0	0	0											
773	David Treasure	1973–74	1976–77	Centre, Stand-off, Scrum-half	112	38	10	1	135	Debut on 25 Nov 1973 v Wigan										
827	… Trialist	1978–79	1978–79		0	0	0	0	0											
916	… Trialist	1986–87	1986–87		0	0	0	0	0											
455	George Troth	1943–44	1943–44		1	0	0	0	0											
972	Shane Tupaea	1991–92	1993–94		70	1	0	0	4											
1487	Jordan Turner	2024	present	Centre, Stand-off	9	6	0	0	24	Debut on 28 Jan 2024 v Halifax Panthers										
343	Joseph Turner	1938–39	1944–45		77	26	11	0 ^²	100											
1501	Mackenzie Turner	2024	present	Wing	3	1	0	0	4	Debut on 3 Mar 2024 v York Knights										
389	Richard Turner	1941–42	1942–43		10	1	0	0	3											
1368	Scott Turner	2017	2017	Wing	20	6	0	0	24											
482	William F. Turner	1945–46	1945–46		1	1	0	0	3											
589	Derek Turner	1955–56	1958–59	Second-row, Loose forward	134	35	1	0 ^²	107											
1159	Marty Turner	2005	2005	Stand-off	23	8	84	1	201											
532	J. V. "James" Tynan	1948–49	1950–51		12	2	0	0	6											
1317	Christopher Tyrer	2013	2013		4	0	0	0	0											
1500	Cian Tyrer	2024	present	Wing	3	10	5	0	50	Debut on 3 Mar 2024 v York Knights										
1475	Kieran Tyrer	2023	2023		8	4	0	0	16											
983	Sean Tyrer	1991–92	1992–93		49	15	38	1	137											
79	George Tyson	1902–03	1911–12	Wing, Centre	246	111	4	0 ^²	341											
1333	George Tyson	2014	2017 ^¹	Centre, Second-row	58	25	0	0	100	Two spells										
640	T. "Gerry" Unsworth	1961–62	1961–62	Wing, Left wing	1	0	0	0	0	a Rochdale Hornets player, who represented a combined Oldham & Rochdale Hornets team against New Zealand in the 1961 New Zealand rugby league tour of Great Britain and France match at Watersheddings, Oldham on Monday 4 September 1961.										
8	Harry Varley	1895–96	1896–97	Stand-off, Scrum-half	60	5	8	0 ^²	43	RFU pre-1895? During his time at Oldham he scored eight goals. All goals worth 2-points apart from seasons 1895–96 season and 1896–97 season when conversions were worth 2-points, penalty goals 3-points and drop goals 4-points.										
1072	Nathan Varley	1998	1999		34	1	0	0	4											
255	Ivan Varty	1927–28	1930–31		7	1	0	0	3											
868	Green Vigo	1982–83	1984–85	Wing	63	20	0	0	73	during his time at Oldham he scored seven 3-point tries and thirteen 4-point tries.										
595	Don Vines	1955–56	1958–59	Prop, Second-row, Loose forward	70	4	0	0	12											
61	J. H. "Harry" Vowles	1900–01	1906–07		208	14	0	0	42											
918	Hugh Waddell	1986–87	1988–89	Prop, Second-row	54	7	0	0	28											
754	Tony Wainwright	1972–73	1976–77		136	55	10	4	189											
549	… Wakefield	1949–50	1949–50		1	0	0	0	0											
825	Gary Walczak	1978–79	1979–80		15	0	0	0	0											
711	David Walker	1968–69	1968–69		1	0	0	0	0											
856	David Walker	1980–81	1980–81	Hooker	4	0	0	0	0											
736	Frank Walker	1970–71	1974–75		33	0	0	0	0											
1265	John Walker	2010	2010		2	0	0	0	0											
694	Peter Walker	1967–68	1967–68		1	0	0	0	0											
425	… Walkley	1942–43	1942–43		4	1	0	0	3											
1188	Andrew Wallace	2006	2006		2	0	0	0	0											
236	Herbert Wallace	1925–26	1928–29		23	0	0	0	0											
1315	Jordan Walne	2013	2017	Second-row, Loose forward, Prop	3	1	0	0	4	Two spells on dual-reg with Salford Red Devils										
639	Alan Walsh	1961–62	1961–62	Centre	1	0	0	0	0	a Rochdale Hornets player, who represented a combined Oldham & Rochdale Hornets team against New Zealand in the 1961 New Zealand rugby league tour of Great Britain and France match at Watersheddings, Oldham on Monday 4 September 1961.										
40	George Walsh	1897–98	1897–98		2	1	0	0	3											
928	Peter Walsh	1987–88	1987–88	Scrum-half	31	13	62	0	176											
421	J. Walton	1942–43	1942–43		1	0	0	0	0											
673	Thomas Warburton	1964–65	1969–70 ^¹	Stand-off	95	28	89	0 ^²	262	Two spells										
629	John Warburton	1959–60	1960–61		6	1	0	0	3											
966	Steve Warburton	1990–91	1992–93		42	12	0	0	48											
563	Ted Ward	1950–51	1950–51	Centre	9	0	7	0 ^²	14											
385	J. Ward	1941–42	1941–42		1	0	0	0	0											
1279	Michael Ward	2011	2014	Prop, Second-row	68	13	0	0	52											
809	Phil Ward	1977–78	1982–83	Wing	63	23	0	0	69											
1342	Jarrod Ward	2015	2015	Wing	12	4	0	0	16											
543	Kenneth Ward	1948–49	1951–52		62	18	3	0 ^²	60											
1494	Joe Wardle	2024	present	Second-row, Centre	8	2	0	0	8	Debut on 28 Jan 2024 v Halifax Panthers										
540	Joe Warham	1948–49	1953–54	Wing	124	69	0	0	207	Debut on 29 Jan 1949 v Liverpool Stanley										
378	… Waring	1940–41	1940–41		1	0	0	0	0											
906	Gary Warnecke	1985–86	1987–88	Centre	87	34	0	0	136											
67	John Waterhouse	1901–02	1901–02		5	0	0	0	0											
164	Moses Waterhouse	1914–15	1914–15		4	1	0	0	3											
259	Emlyn Watkins	1927–28	1942–43 ^¹	Second-row	116	10	0	0	30	Two spells										
366	Billy Watkins	1940–41	1940–41	Scrum-half	1	0	1	0 ^²	2											
1146	Ian Watson	2004	2004	Scrum-half	29	6	5	7	41											
568	John Watson	1951–52	1955–56		24	2	0	0	6											
143	Charles Waye	1912–13	1919–20		35	1	0	0	3											
395	E. Webb	1941–42	1941–42		1	1	0	0	3											
1089	Daniel Webster	1999	1999		7	0	0	0	0											
126	William Webster	1909–10	1912–13	Stand-off	8	2	0	0	6											
777	R. "Bob" Welding	1973–74	1976–77		58	0	0	0	0											
1446	Calvin Wellington	2022	2023	Centre, Wing	11	4	0	0	16	Debut on 30 Jan 2022 v Lock Lane ARLFC										
533	George Welsby	1948–49	1949–50		10	1	0	0	3											
155	Arthur West	1912–13	1914–15		45	5	1	0 ^²	17											
1392	Ben West	2018	2018		14	9	0	0	36											
505	W Whalley	1945–46	1945–46		1	0	0	0	0											
134	James Wharton	1910–11	1920–21		72	9	0	0	27											
102	Thomas White	1904–05	1913–14	Wing, Stand-off, Scrum-half	224	49	81	0 ^²	309											
703	Derek Whitehead	1968–69	1969–70	Fullback	49	2	139	0 ^²	284	Debut on 17 Aug 1968 v Huddersfield										
289	Harold Whitehead	1932–33	1944–45	Hooker	30	0	0	0	0	Debut on 14 Jan 1933 v Broughton Rangers										
659	Stuart Whitehead	1962–63	1965–66		76	17	0	0	51											
1327	Thomas Whitehead	2013	2014	Fullback	9	1	0	0	4											
1259	Daniel Whitmore	2010	2014	Stand-off, Scrum-half, Hooker	74	12	1	0	50											
763	Steve Whitmore	1973–74	1973–74		2	0	0	0	0											
1406	Emmerson Whittel	2019	2023	Loose forward	64	5	0	0	20	Debut on 17 Feb 2019 v Workington Town; 2 separate stints 2019, 2022–23										
796	Alan Whittle	1976–77	1976–77	Wing, Centre, Stand-off, Scrum-half	12	2	0	0	6	Debut on 6 Feb 1977 v Hull KR										
17	Jack Whittle	1895–96	1898–99		2	0	0	0	0	also RFU pre-1895?										
19	James Whittle	1895–96	1895–96		5	0	0	0	0	also RFU pre-1895?										
292	Wilfred Whitworth	1932–33	1934–35	Centre	22	3	0	0	9	Debut on 28 Jan 1933 v York										
555	Eric Wiggett	1949–50	1950–51		3	0	0	0	0											
133	Albert Wilcocks	1909–10	1910–11		5	0	0	0	0											
807	Andrew Wilde	1977–78	1977–78		1	0	0	0	0											
742	Michael Wilde	1970–71	1971–72		10	0	0	0	0											
1063	Steve Wilde	1998	1998		17	6	0	0	24											
1492	Matty Wildie	2024	present	Hooker, Scrum-half, Stand-off	8	2	0	0	8											
1158	Alex Wilkinson	2005	2008	Wing, Centre, Second-row	73	24	0	0	96											
692	W. "Cheyenne" Wilkinson	1967–68	1971–72		3	0	0	0	0											
1074	Christopher Wilkinson	1998	1998		13	0	34	3	71											
363	Frank Wilkinson	1940–41	1947–48		24	7	0	0	21											
55	George Wilkinson	1899–1900	1902–03		79	1	0	0	3											
51	Joseph Wilkinson	1898–99	1909–10	Prop, Second-row	275	14	1	0 ^²	44	Debut on 14 Jan 1899 v Tyldesley FC										
1379	Matty Wilkinson	2017	2018	Hooker	80	25	0	0	100	Debut on 2 Jul 2017 v Toulouse Olympique										
666	William Wilkinson	1964–65	1964–65		1	0	0	0	0											
1380	Connor Williams	2017	2017	Fullback, Centre, Wing	4	1	0	0	4	Dual-reg with Salford Red Devils										
386	Cyril Williams	1941–42	1941–42		9	3	0	0	9											
1192	Desai Williams	2006	2006		11	4	0	0	16											
273	Llewelyn Williams	1929–30	1933–34	Centre	115	63	0	0	189											
42	Samuel Williams	1897–98	1904–05		132	119	1	0 ^²	359											
1196	Sean Williams	2006	2006		8	0	0	0	0											
380	Syd Williams	1940–41	1940–41	Fullback, Wing, Centre	1	0	0	0	0											
141	Thomas Williams	1911–12	1918–19	Wing	83	40	0	0	120	Debut on 9 Dec 1911 v Broughton Rangers										
544	Trevor Williams	1948–49	1949–50		16	6	0	0	18											
1275	Alistair Williams	2011	2011		1	0	0	0	0											
871	Christopher Willis	1982–83	1983–84	Fullback, Stand-off	29	3	1	0	11											
439	… Wills	1943–44	1943–44		7	0	0	0	0											
661	Kenneth Wilson	1963–64	1973–74	Prop	321	25	6	0 ^²	87	Debut on 24 Aug 1963 v Rochdale Hornets										
101	Benjamin Wilson	1904–05	1904–05		5	1	0	0	3											
1479	Harvey Wilson	2023	2023	Prop	8	2	0	0	8	On dual-reg loan from Wigan Warriors										
94	Joseph Wilson	1903–04	1903–04		1	1	0	0	3											
1165	Jon Wilson	2005	2005	Prop	22	3	0	0	12											
128	Jack Wiltshire	1909–10	1919–20	Prop	47	9	0	0	27	Debut on 4 Sep 1909 v Hull KR										
71	J. Windle	1901–02	1901–02		2	0	0	0	0											
1464	Dane Windrow	2022	2022	Second-row	9	2	0	0	8	Debut on 24 Apr 2022 v Cornwall RLFC										
1179	Lee Wingfield	2006	2007		19	6	0	0	24											
560	Charlie Winslade	1950–51	1961–62	Prop	358	30	2	0 ^²	94											
675	John Winton	1964–65	1965–66	Fullback	49	2	143	0 ^²	292											
135	Frederick W. Wise	1910–11	1913–14		64	6	0	0	18											
119	Alfred Wood	1908–09	1920–21	Fullback	248	0	349	0 ^²	698	Debut on 5 Sep 1908 v St Helens										
1266	Benjamin Wood	2011	2014 ^¹	Centre	30	13	0	0	52	Two spells										
1083	Daniel Wood	1999	1999		6	1	12	1	29											
651	Graham Wood	1962–63	1967–68		16	0	0	0	0											
1371	Mike Wood	2017	2019		11	0	0	0	0											
434	William "Bill" Wood	1943–44	1947–48		68	1	0	0	3											
1361	Sam Wood	2016	2016	Centre, Wing	13	5	3	0	26											
78	Turner Wood	1902–03	1902–03		2	0	0	0	0											
49	F. Woodhead	1898–99	1898–99		2	0	0	0	0											
1271	Thomas Wood-Hulme	2011	2011		5	0	0	0	0											
519	George Woods	1947–48	1948–49		7	1	0	0	3											
227	Albert Woodward	1923–24	1925–26		64	17	0	0	51											
52	Fred Wormald	1898–99	1902–03		31	0	5	0 ^²	10											
24	Fred Worrall	1895–96	1895–96		11	0	0	0	0	also RFU pre-1895?										
761	Geoffrey Worrall	1972–73	1972–73		1	0	2	0	4											
843	Michael Worrall	1979–80	1987–88	Second-row, Loose forward	173	31	61	0	237	during his time at Oldham he scored nine 3-point tries and twenty-two 4-point tries.										
730	Gordon Worswick	1969–70	1969–70		5	0	0	0	0											
1418	James Worthington	2020	2020	Fullback, Centre	2	0	0	0	0											
87	Jim Wright	1902–03	1913–14		228	5	0	0	15	is this James Wright?										
884	Nicholas Wright	1983–84	1983–84		8	0	3	0	6											
1448	Ryan Wright	2022	2022	Hooker	4	0	0	0	0	Debut on 30 Jan 2022 v Lock Lane ARLFC										
10	Bob Wylie	1895–96	1896–97		51	1	1	0 ^²	5	also RFU pre-1895?										
1462	Billy Yarrow	2022	2023	Hooker	12	3	0	0	12	Debut on 10 Apr 2022 v West Wales Raiders										
492	William "Bill" Yates	1945–46	1945–46		1	0	0	0	0											
111	Michael Yewlett	1906–07	1907–08		37	5	0	0	15											
131	W. "Billy" Young	1909–10	1918–19		36	20	0	0	60											

- ^¹ = Played For Oldham (Bears) During More Than One Period
- ^² = drop-goals are currently worth 1-point, but from the 1897–98 season to prior to the 1973-74 season all goals, whether; conversions, penalties, or drop-goals, scored two points, consequently during this time drop-goals were often not explicitly documented, and "0²"indicates that drop-goals may not have been recorded, rather than no drop-goals scored. In addition, prior to the 1949–50 season, the Field-goal was also still a valid means of scoring points
- ^³ = During the first two seasons of the Northern Union (now known as the Rugby Football League), i.e. the 1895–96 season and 1896–97 season, conversions were worth 2-points, penalty goals 3-points and drop goals 4-points.
- ¢ = player has (potential) links to other rugby league clubs on Wikipedia
- BBC = BBC2 Floodlit Trophy
- CC = Challenge Cup
- CF = Championship Final
- CM = Captain Morgan Trophy
- LC = Lancashire County Cup
- LL = Lancashire League
- RT = League Cup, i.e. Player's № 6, John Player (Special), Regal Trophy

== Hall of Fame ==
There are currently 27 players included in the club's Hall of Fame:

Fred Ashworth • Alan Davies • Mike Elliott • John Etty • Joe Ferguson • Terry Flanagan • Bernard Ganley • Alex Givvons • Andrew Goodway • Herman Hilton • Robert Irving • Arthur Lees • Sid Little • Martin Murphy • Harry Ogden • Jack Read • Frank Stirrup • Kevin Taylor • Derek Turner • John Hough • Phil Larder • Mike Ford • Alf Wood • Bob Sloman • Mick Worrall • Des Foy • Neil Roden

== Notable former players ==
These players have either; received a Testimonial match, are "Hall of Fame" inductees, played during Oldham Bears' two Super League seasons, were international representatives before, or after, their time at Oldham, or are notable outside of rugby league.

- Les Anthony
- Darren Abram
- Raymond "Ray" Ashton 1984 Great Britain Tourist
- Keith Atkinson (Testimonial match 1993)
- Adrian Belle
- Ben Beynon circa-1920s
- David Bradbury
- Gary Burns
- Joseph "Joe" Collins
- John Clarke circa-1996/97
- James "Jimmy" Cowan
- Martin Crompton
- Ryan Lawton (Loose forward)
- Paul Crook
- Paul Davidson circa-1996-97
- Paul Deacon
- Tom Helm 1910 Great Britain Tourist
- Joe Faimalo circa-1996/97
- Reg Farrar
- Vince Fawcett
- Frank Foster
- Steve Gartland
- Ian Gildart
- Brett Goldspink circa-1996/97
- Luke Goodwin circa-1996/97
- Danny Guest
- Shayne McMenemy
- Reece Guy
- Howard Hill
- Viv Huzzey
- Shaun Irwin
- David Jones circa-1996-97
- Jack 'Bedwellty' Jones
- Jack Keith (Testimonial match 1960)
- Alan Kellett
- Phil Larder (Testimonial match 1979)
- Peaufai "Afi" Leuila circa-1996-97
- Gary Lord
- Francis Maloney circa-1996-97
- Chris McKinney
- Matt Munro
- Robert Myler
- Mike Neal
- Paul Norman
- John 'Ben' Andrew
- Andrew Patmore
- John A. Power circa-1993-95
- Malcolm Price
- Sean Quinlan
- Scott Ranson
- Craig Richards
- Ian Russell
- Ian Sherratt
- George William Smith 1908–1916
- Peter Smith
- Jack Stephens captain 1929-30/1934-35 P186 T79 G37 P311
- David Stephenson
- Paul Stevens
- Jason Temu
- Paul Topping circa-1996/97
- Don Vines
