= William James (rugby league) =

English rugby league footballer (1928–1936)

Playing information
- Position: Wing
Club
Years	Team	Pld	T	G	FG	P
1928–29	Oldham RLFC	3	1	0	0	3
1929–36	Castleford	151	22	168	2	406
	Total	154	23	168	2	409

William James was a professional rugby league footballer who played in the 1920s and 1930s. He played at club level for Oldham RLFC (Heritage No. 265) and Castleford (Heritage No. 78).

== Playing career ==
William James played in Castleford's victory in the Yorkshire County League during the 1932–33 season.

In September 1935, Castleford reduced their asking fee for the transfer of James from £150 to £50.
