= Bob Ogden =

English rugby league footballer

Playing information
- Position: Scrum-half
Club
Years	Team	Pld	T	G	FG	P
1943–44	Oldham RLFC	7	0	0	0	0
1949–51	Wakefield Trinity	23	6	0	0	18
	Total	30	6	0	0	18

Bob Ogden is a former professional rugby league footballer who played in the 1940s and 1950s. He played at club level for Wakefield Trinity and Oldham R.L.F.C., as a scrum-half.

== Playing career ==
Ogden made his début for Wakefield Trinity during January 1949.
