= Adam Files =

English rugby league footballer

Personal information
- Born: 7 January 1993 (age 33) Salford, Greater Manchester, England

Playing information
- Position: Hooker
Club
Years	Team	Pld	T	G	FG	P
	Salford City Reds
2013(loan)	→ Oldham	24	15	0	0	60
2014–16	Oldham	42	8	0	0	32
	Total	66	23	0	0	92
- Source: As of 6 May 2024

Adam Files (born 7 January 1993) is a professional rugby league footballer who last played for Oldham RLFC in the Kingstone Press Championship. He plays as a hooker.

Files came through the Salford City Reds academy and joined Oldham on a season-long loan deal for the 2013 season.
