= Phil Joy =

English rugby league footballer

Personal information
- Full name: Phil Joy
- Born: 4 September 1991 (age 34) Oldham, Greater Manchester, England
- Height: 6 ft 3 in (1.91 m)
- Weight: 17 st 7 lb (111 kg)

Playing information
- Position: Prop
Club
Years	Team	Pld	T	G	FG	P
2012–21	Oldham	166	27	0	0	108
- Source: As of 7 May 2024

Phil Joy (born 4 September 1991) is an English professional rugby league footballer who last played as a prop for Oldham in the Championship.

== Background ==
Joy was born in Oldham, Greater Manchester, England.

== Career ==
Joy made his Oldham début on 2 Sep 2012 v Gateshead Thunder.
