= Bernard Frederick =

Wales international rugby league & union footballer

Personal information
- Full name: Bernard Frederick
- Born: Wales
- Died: unknown

Playing information

Rugby union
Club
Years	Team	Pld	T	G	FG	P
1911–12	Newport RFC	35

Rugby league
- Position: Forward
Club
Years	Team	Pld	T	G	FG	P
1912–13	Oldham	9	0	0	0	0
Representative
Years	Team	Pld	T	G	FG	P
1913	Wales	1

Bernard Frederick (birth unknown – death unknown) was a Welsh rugby union and professional rugby league footballer who played in the 1910s. He played club level rugby union (RU) for Newport RFC, and representative level rugby league (RL) for Wales, and at club level for Oldham, as a forward.

== International honours ==
Bernard Frederick won a cap for Wales (RL) while at Oldham in 1913.
