= Tate Moseley =

Australian rugby league footballer

Personal information
- Full name: Tate Moseley
- Born: 21 March 1977 (age 48); Sydney, New South Wales, Australia

Playing information
- Position: Second-row
Club
Years	Team	Pld	T	G	FG	P
1997–98	South Sydney	2	0	0	0	0
1999	Western Suburbs	13	1	0	0	4
2000	Oldham	4	0	0	0	0
	Total	19	1	0	0	4
- Source: As of 31 May 2019

Tate Moseley is an Australian former professional rugby league footballer who played in the 1990s and 2000s. He played for South Sydney and Western Suburbs in the Australian Rugby League and NRL competitions. He then played for Oldham in England.

== Playing career ==
Moseley made his first grade debut for South Sydney against St George in Round 16 1997 at Kogarah Oval. Moseley would only make one further appearance for Souths in first grade which was the following week against North Sydney which ended in a 40–8 defeat at the Sydney Football Stadium.

In 1999, Moseley signed for Western Suburbs and played 13 games for the club in what proved to be their last season in the top grade as a stand-alone entity. Moseley played in the club's last game before their merger with fellow foundation club Balmain. Moseley played at second-row as Wests were defeated 60-16 by the Auckland Warriors.

In 2000, Moseley signed with Oldham in England after not being offered a contract to play with the newly formed Wests Tigers. Moseley only played one season for the club before being released.
