= Ryan Wright (rugby league) =

English rugby league footballer (born 1991)

Personal information
- Full name: Ryan Wright
- Born: 28 October 1991 (age 34) England

Playing information
- Position: Hooker
Club
Years	Team	Pld	T	G	FG	P
2013–15	Dewsbury Rams	29	2	0	0	8
2015	Doncaster RLFC	8	1	0	0	4
2015–16	Dewsbury Rams	6	0	0	0	0
2016(loan)	→ Doncaster RLFC	12	2	0	0	8
2017	Doncaster RLFC	19	3	0	0	12
2017(loan)	→ Gloucestershire All Golds	1	0	0	0	0
2018	Keighley Cougars	14	2	0	0	8
2018–19	Hunslet	21	3	0	0	12
2020–21	Keighley Cougars	17	2	0	0	8
2022	Oldham RLFC	4	0	0	0	0
	Total	131	15	0	0	60
- Source: As of 5 May 2024

Ryan Wright (born 28 October 1991) is an English professional rugby league footballer who last played as hooker for the Oldham RLFC in League 1.

He has played for the Dewsbury Rams (two spells), Doncaster (three spells, including one on loan), Gloucestershire All Golds (loan), and the Keighley Cougars in Kingstone Press League 1, as a hooker.

Wright started his career at Dewsbury Rams in 2013 and spent two seasons at the club before joining Doncaster partway through the 2015 season. At the end of the 2015 season he rejoined Dewsbury for 2016 but returned to Doncaster on loan during the 2016 season. A permanent move to Doncaster was made for 2017 but at the end of the 2017 season he signed for Keighley Cougars for 2018. In July 2018 due to financial problems at Keighley, Wright left the club and joined League 1 rivals, Hunslet.
