= Sean Quinlan (rugby) =

Irish rugby union player

- Full name: Sean Vincent Joseph Quinlan
- Born: 13 October 1934 Cork, Ireland
- Died: January 2018 (aged 83)

Rugby union career
- Position: Wing
International career
Years	Team	Apps	(Points)
1956–58	Ireland	4	(0)
- Rugby league career

Playing information
Club
Years	Team	Pld	T	G	FG	P
1958–61	Oldham RLFC	11

Sean Vincent Joseph Quinlan (13 October 1934 — January 2018) was an Irish international rugby union player.

Quinlan was born in Cork and was educated at Dublin's Blackrock College.

A wing three-quarter, Quinlan was capped four times for Ireland, with three appearances in the 1956 Five Nations, before returning for a match against France two years later. He then switched to rugby league, signing with English club Oldham for the 1958–59 season. Due to persistent knee injuries, Quinlan could only put together 11 first team appearances over three seasons.

== See also ==
- List of Ireland national rugby union players
