= 1928 Great Britain Lions tour =

- Manager: G.F. Hutchins and E. Osborne
- Tour captain(s): Jonty Parkin
- Top point scorer(s): Jim Sullivan (113)
- Top try scorer(s): Alf Ellaby (20)
Summary
P	W	D	L
Total
24	18	1	5
Test match
6	4	0	2
Opponent
P	W	D	L
Australia
3	2	0	1
New Zealand
3	2	0	1

Tour chronology
- Previous tour: 1924
- Next tour: 1932

The 1928 Great Britain Lions tour was a tour by the Great Britain national rugby league team of Australia and New Zealand which took place between May and August 1928. The tour involved a schedule of 24 games; 16 in Australia, including a three-test series against Australia for the Ashes and a further eight in New Zealand, including a three-test series against New Zealand.

Captained by Jonty Parkin, the Lions returned home having won 18, lost five and drawn one of their games. They won the Ashes against Australia by two tests to one, and also two out of three tests against New Zealand.

== Squad ==
An initial 23-man squad for the tour was named on 29 February 1928, with three additional players being selected two weeks later and Jonty Parkin being appointed as captain. In April, Frank Gallagher declined his tour invitation for business reasons, and Joe Thompson was selected as a replacement.

Name	Position	Nationality	Club
Walter Gowers	Fullback	England	Rochdale Hornets
Jim Sullivan	Fullback	Wales	Wigan
Tom Askin	Three-quarter	England	Featherstone Rovers
Jim Brough	Three-quarter	England	Leeds
Alf Ellaby	Three-quarter	England	St Helens
John Evans	Three-quarter	England	Swinton
Alf Frodsham	Three-quarter	England	St Helens
Emlyn Gwynne	Three-quarter	Wales	Hull
Joe Oliver	Three-quarter	England	Batley
Mel Rosser	Three-quarter	Wales	Leeds
Bryn Evans	Half-back	England	Swinton
Les Fairclough	Half-back	England	St Helens
Jonty Parkin (c)	Half-back	England	Wakefield Trinity
William Rees	Half-back	Wales	Swinton
Nat Bentham	Forward	England	Wigan Highfield
Harold Bowman	Forward	England	Hull
Frank Bowen	Forward	England	St Helens Recs
Bill Burgess	Forward	England	Barrow
Oliver Dolan	Forward	England	St Helens Recs
Albert Fildes	Forward	England	St Helens Recs
Ben Halfpenny	Forward	England	St Helens
Bill Horton	Forward	England	Wakefield Trinity
Bob Sloman	Forward	England	Oldham
Joe Thompson	Forward	Wales	Leeds
Billy Williams	Forward	Wales	Salford
Harold Young	Forward	England	Bradford Northern

The two team managers were G.F. Hutchins of Oldham and E. Osborne of Warrington.

== Schedule and results ==
The touring party departed from Tilbury on 20 April 1928 on board the SS Cathay. The team arrived in Melbourne on 28 May, with thirteen players travelling by train for the opening game of the tour in Cootamundra, while the rest of the team continued their journey via ship to Sydney.

Date	Opponents	Score (GB first)	Venue	Attendance	Notes
30 May	South West District	14–14	Cootamundra	8,000	
2 June	New South Wales	15–20	Sydney	55,000	
4 June	New South Wales	22–9	Sydney	48,000	
9 June	New South Wales	7–22	Sydney	38,000	
13 June	Far Northern Coast	20–9	Lismore	6,500	
16 June	Queensland	7–21	Brisbane	25,000	
20 June	Ipswich	23–13	Ipswich	2,000	
23 June	Australia	15–12	Brisbane	39,200	
27 June	Central Queensland	27–11	Rockhampton	10,000	
30 June	Northern Queensland	30–16	Townsville	11,000	
4 July	Wide Bay	61–13	Bundaberg	4,000	
7 July	Toowoomba	17–12	Toowoomba	12,000	
11 July	Newcastle	19–17	Newcastle	7,000	
14 July	Australia	8–0	Sydney	44,548	
18 July	Western NSW	22–9	Parkes	9,000	
21 July	Australia	14–21	Sydney	37,000	
1 August	South Auckland	31–5	Hamilton		
4 August	New Zealand	13–17	Auckland	28,000	
8 August	Auckland	14–9	Auckland	15,000	
11 August	Auckland City	26–15	Auckland	25,000	
14 August	Buller	72–3	Westport		
15 August	West Coast	62–13	Greymouth		
18 August	New Zealand	13–5	Dunedin	12,000	
25 August	New Zealand	6–5	Christchurch	21,000	

Following the end of the third test against New Zealand, the team departed Auckland aboard the RMS Niagara, and played two exhibition games in Canada before returning home.
