= Billy Mercer (rugby league) =

England international rugby league footballer (1905–1965)

Bill Mercer
- Ogden's Cigarette card featuring William Mercer

Personal information
- Full name: William Mercer
- Born: 9 May 1905 Prescot district, England
- Died: March 1965 (aged 59) St. Helens district, England

Playing information
- Position: Wing, Centre, Second-row, Loose forward
Club
Years	Team	Pld	T	G	FG	P
1925–37	St. Helens	311	75	0	0	225
Representative
Years	Team	Pld	T	G	FG	P
1929–33	Lancashire	7	5	0	0	15
1930	England	1	0	0	0	0

William Mercer (9 May 1905 – March 1965) was an English professional rugby league footballer who played in the 1920s and 1930s. He played at representative level for England and Lancashire, and at club level for St. Helens (captain), as a wing, centre, second-row or loose forward.

== Background ==
Billy Mercer's birth was registered in Prescot district, Lancashire, England, he was a joiner for St. Helens Council, and he died aged 59 in St. Helens district, Lancashire, England.

== Playing career ==
=== Championship final appearances ===
Mercer played at centre in St. Helens' 9–5 victory over Huddersfield in the Championship Final during the 1931–32 season at Belle Vue, Wakefield on Saturday 7 May 1932.

=== County League appearances ===
Mercer played in St. Helens' victories in the Lancashire League during the 1929–30 season and 1931–32 season.

=== Challenge Cup Final appearances ===
Mercer played at centre in St. Helens' 3–10 defeat by Widnes in the 1929–30 Challenge Cup Final at Wembley Stadium, London on Saturday 3 May 1930, in front of a crowd of 36,544.

=== Club career ===
Mercer made his début for St. Helens in the 15–3 victory over Batley at Knowsley Road on Saturday 26 September 1925, and scored his first try in the 55–6 victory over Bradford Northern at Odsal Stadium on Wednesday 14 April 1926, his last match was the 7–25 defeat by Warrington at Knowsley Road on Saturday 6 November 1937. Bill Mercer did not play in St. Helens' 10–2 victory over Widnes in the 1926 Lancashire Cup Final during the 1926–27 season on Saturday 20 November 1926, George Cotton and Alf Ellaby played as Wings, Alf Frodsham and George Lewis played as Centres, and Les Fairclough played as Stand-off.

=== Representative honours ===
Mercer won a cap for England while at St. Helens in the 19–35 defeat by Other Nationalities at Thrum Hall, Halifax on Monday 7 April 1930.

Mercer made his début for Lancashire in the 15–7 victory over Cumberland at Whitehaven on Tuesday 29 October 1929, alongside fellow St. Helens player Alf Ellaby who scored three tries, Mercer had two further victories alongside Alf Ellaby, against Yorkshire and Glamorgan and Monmouthshire as Lancashire won the County Championship.
