= 1933–34 Lancashire Cup =

Rugby league championship edition

- Structure: Regional knockout championship
- Teams: 13
- Winners: Oldham
- Runners-up: St Helens Recs

The 1933–34 Lancashire Cup was the twenty-sixth occasion on which the completion had been held. Oldham won the trophy by beating St Helens Recs by 12–0.

== Background ==
The number of teams entering this year's competition remained at 13 and the same fixture format was retained. There was only one bye in the first round but now also a "blank" or "dummy" fixture. This also resulted in one bye in the second round.

== Competition and results ==
=== Round 1 ===
Involved 6 matches (with one bye and one "blank" fixture) and 13 clubs

| Game No | Fixture date | Home team | Score | Away team | Venue | Att | Rec | Notes | Ref |
|---|---|---|---|---|---|---|---|---|---|
| 1 | Sat 23 Sep 1933 | St Helens Recs | 5–2 | Warrington | City Road | | | | |
| 2 | Sat 30 Sep 1933 | Oldham | 2–0 | Widnes | Watersheddings | | | | |
| 3 | Sat 30 Sep 1933 | Rochdale Hornets | 19–10 | London Highfield | Athletic Grounds | | | 1 | |
| 4 | Sat 30 Sep 1933 | St. Helens | 12–8 | Salford | Knowsley Road | | | | |
| 5 | Sat 30 Sep 1933 | Swinton | 9–6 | Leigh | Station Road | | | | |
| 6 | Sat 30 Sep 1933 | Wigan | 21–2 | Barrow | Central Park | | | | |
| 7 | | Broughton Rangers | | bye | | | | | |
| 8 | | blank | | blank | | | | | |

=== Round 2 – quarterfinals ===
Involved 3 matches (with one bye) and 7 clubs

| Game No | Fixture date | Home team | Score | Away team | Venue | Att | Rec | Notes | Ref |
|---|---|---|---|---|---|---|---|---|---|
| 1 | Wed 11 Oct 1933 | Broughton Rangers | 0–12 | Oldham | Belle Vue Stadium | | | 2 | |
| 2 | Mon 16 Oct 1933 | St. Helens | 52–14 | Rochdale Hornets | Knowsley Road | | | | |
| 3 | Wed 18 Oct 1933 | St Helens Recs | 19–5 | Swinton | City Road | | | | |
| 4 | | Wigan | | bye | | | | | |

=== Round 3 – semifinals ===
Involved 2 matches and 4 clubs

| Game No | Fixture date | Home team | Score | Away team | Venue | Att | Rec | Notes | Ref |
|---|---|---|---|---|---|---|---|---|---|
| 1 | Wed 25 Oct 1933 | Wigan | 15–21 | Oldham | Central Park | | | | |
| 2 | Thu 02 Nov 1933 | St Helens Recs | 9–2 | St. Helens | City Road | 12,000 | | | |

=== Final ===
The match was played at Station Road, Pendlebury, Salford, (historically in the county of Lancashire). The attendance was 9,085 and receipts £516 (both disappointing after last year's crowd of 28,500 and gate receipts of £1,675.

| Game No | Fixture date | Home team | Score | Away team | Venue | Att | Rec | Notes | Ref |
|---|---|---|---|---|---|---|---|---|---|
| | Saturday 18 November 1933 | Oldham | 12–0 | St Helens Recs | Station Road | 9,085 | £516 | 3 | |

==== Teams and scorers ====
| Oldham | No. | St Helens Recs |
|---|---|---|
| | teams | |
| Tommy Rees | 1 | Alf Frodsham |
| Albert Taylor | 2 | Laithwaite |
| Sam Bardsley | 3 | Albert Bailey |
| Jack Stephens | 4 | Heaton |
| Les Lewis | 5 | J. Turton |
| Tom Egan | 6 | W. Bowen |
| Jack Reynolds | 7 | W. Greenall |
| Jack Read | 8 | G. Highcock |
| Jack Scaife | 9 | Oliver Dolan |
| Ted Hodgson | 10 | W. Liptrot |
| Trevor Thomas | 11 | Mason |
| Abe Clayton | 12 | J. Green |
| Fred Ashworth | 13 | W. Grundy |
| 12 | score | 0 |
| 0 | HT | 0 |
| | Scorers | |
| | Tries | |
| Sam Bardsley | T | |
| Jack Stephens | T | |
| | T | |
| | T | |
| | Goals | |
| Tommy Rees (3) | G | |
| | G | |
| | Drop Goals | |
| | DG | |
| Referee | | |

Scoring – Try = three (3) points – Goal = two (2) points – Drop goal = two (2) points

=== The road to success ===
First round
Wigan | 21
Barrow | 2
blank
blank
Broughton Rangers
bye
Oldham | 2
Widnes | 0
St Helens Recs | 5
Warrington | 2
Swinton | 9
Leigh | 6
St. Helens | 12
Salford | 8
Rochdale Hornets | 19
London Highfield | 10

Second round
Wigan
bye
Broughton Rangers | 0
Oldham | 12
St Helens Recs | 19
Swinton | 5
St. Helens | 52
Rochdale Hornets | 14

Semifinals
Wigan | 15
Oldham | 21
St Helens Recs | 9
St. Helens | 2

Final
Oldham | 12
St Helens Recs | 0

== See also ==
- 1933–34 Northern Rugby Football League season
- Rugby league county cups
