= 1932 Great Britain Lions tour =

- Manager: G.F. Hutchins and R.F. Anderton
- Tour captain(s): Jim Sullivan
Summary
P	W	D	L
Total
26	23	1	2
Test match
6	5	0	1
Opponent
P	W	D	L
Australia
3	2	0	1
New Zealand
3	3	0	0

Tour chronology
- Previous tour: 1928
- Next tour: 1936

The 1932 Great Britain Lions tour was a tour by the Great Britain national rugby league team) of Australia and New Zealand which took place between May and August 1932. The tour involved a schedule of 26 games, 18 in Australia including a three-test series against Australia for the Ashes and a further eight in New Zealand including a three-test series against New Zealand.

Captained by Welshman Jim Sullivan, the Lions returned home having won 23, lost two and drawn one of their games. They won the Ashes against Australia by two tests to one and made a clean sweep against New Zealand winning all three test matches.

Despite being a British team - six of the squad were Welsh - the team were universally referred to by both the press at home and away, as England.

== Squad ==
A 26-man squad was selected for the tour with the names announced in March 1932.

Backs
Name	Club	Age
Fullbacks
Gus Risman	Salford	22
Jim Sullivan	Wigan	28
Threequarters
Wings
Alf Ellaby	St. Helens	27
Barney Hudson	Salford	26
Stanley Smith	Leeds	21
Jack Woods	Barrow	23
Centres
Arthur Atkinson	Castleford	25
Stan Brogden	Huddersfield	21
Billy Dingsdale	Warrington	25
Gilbert Robinson	Wakefield Trinity	22
Half-backs
Stand-offs
Ivor Davies	Halifax	24
Ernest Pollard	Wakefield Trinity	21
Scrum halves
Les Adams	Leeds	23
Bryn Evans	Swinton	28

Forwards
Name	Club	Age
Front row
Hookers
John Lowe	Leeds	25
Leslie White	Hunslet	25
Props
Nat Silcock	Widnes	26
Joe Thompson	Leeds	29
Billy Williams	Salford	28
Joe Wright	Swinton	28
Back row
Second-rows
Norman Fender	York	21
Albert Fildes	St. Helens	29
Martin Hodgson	Swinton	23
Bill Horton	Wakefield Trinity	25
Loose forwards
Fred Butters	Swinton	25
Jack Feetham	Salford	24

The two team managers were G.F. Hutchins of Oldham and R.F. Anderton of Warrington.

== Schedule and results ==
The team sailed from Southampton on 14 April 1932 on-board the SS Jervis Bay arriving in Melbourne on 19 May and travelling to Sydney by train on 20 May.

Date	Opponents	Venue	Score (GB first)	Attendance	Notes
28 May	Metropolis	Sydney Cricket Ground	Won 28–5	42,644	Metropolis was a representative side made up of players playing in the Sydney area. Program
1 June	Western New South Wales	Wade Park	Won 50–9	6,000	Western New South Wales was a representative team for teams playing in New South Wales Country Rugby League groups 10 and 14.
4 June	New South Wales	Sydney Cricket Ground	Won 18–5	30,104	
6 June	Australia	Sydney Cricket Ground	Won 8–6	70,204	The attendance was a new world record for a rugby league test.
8 June	Far Northern	Recreation ground, Lismore	Won 44–8	4,965	Far Northern was a representative side covering the northern area of New South Wales.
11 June	Queensland	Brisbane Cricket Ground	Won 15–10	13,034	
15 June	Brisbane Firsts	Brisbane Cricket Ground	Lost 15–18	4,843	Brisbane Firsts was a representative team drawn from the first-grade clubs in the Brisbane area.
18 June	Australia	Brisbane Cricket Ground	Lost 6–15	26,574	
20 June	Wide Bay	Gympie	Won 56–17	2,500	Wide Bay was a representative team drawn from clubs in the Wide Bay division of the Queensland Rugby League.
21 June	Central Queensland	Rockhampton Showground	Won 63–21	4,000	Central Queensland was a representative team drawn from clubs in the Central division of the Queensland Rugby League.
25 June	Northern Queensland	Townsville	Won 20–2	7,312	Northern Queensland was a representative team drawn from clubs in the Northern division of the Queensland Rugby League.
28 June	Far North Queensland	Parramatta Park, Cairns	Won 53–8	5,000	Far North Queensland was the representative team of the Cairns District Rugby League
2 July	Ipswich	Ipswich	Won 19–2	3,022	Ipswich was the representative team for the Southern region of the Queensland Rugby League.
6 July	Toowoomba	Toowoomba	Draw 7–7	10,861	Toowoomba was the representative side of the Toowoomba Rugby League.
9 July	New South Wales	Sydney Cricket Ground	Won 22–5	19,744	
14 July	Newcastle	Newcastle	Won 32–15	6,563	Newcastle was the representative team of the Newcastle Rugby League. This game was interrupted by a timekeeper's error sounding the end of game 11 minutes early. The game was resumed and played to completion when the error was discovered.
16 July	Australia	Sydney Cricket Ground	Won 18–13	50,053	
20 July	Riverina	Wagga Showground, Wagga Wagga	Won 18–6	9,000	Riverina was the representative team for teams in Group 9 of the New South Wales Country Rugby League.
27 July	North Auckland	Kensington Park Whangārei	Won 56–5	3,000	
30 July	New Zealand	Carlaw Park, Auckland	Won 24–9	25,000	
3 August	South Auckland	Taupiri	Won 64–11	1,600	
6 August	Auckland	Carlaw Park, Auckland	Won 19–14	16,000	
10 August	West Coast	Victoria Park, Greymouth	Won 32–8	3,000	West Coast was the representative team of the West Coast Rugby League.
13 August	New Zealand	Monica Park, Christchurch	Won 25–14	7,000	
17 August	North Island	Winter Show Grounds, Wellington	Won 59–8	3,000	
20 August	New Zealand	Carlaw Park, Auckland	Won 20–18	12,000	

Following the end of the third test against New Zealand, the team sailed for home the same day on-board the SS Tamaroa, having readied for the last test on the ship, arriving back in Southampton on 23 September 1932.

During the Australian leg of the tour the team scored 105 tries and 84 goals (483 points) while conceding 32 tries and 38 goals (172 points), total attendances approaching 320,000 generated gate receipts of A£27,885. In the games in New Zealand the team scored 65 tries and 52 goals (299 points) conceding 17 tries and 18 goals (87 points).

== Ashes series ==
=== Test venues ===
The three Ashes series tests took place at the following venues.

Sydney	Brisbane
Sydney Cricket Ground	Brisbane Cricket Ground
Capacity: 70,000	Capacity: 40,000

=== First test ===
The first test was played at the Sydney Cricket Ground on Monday 6 June 1932. The interest in the game was so large that the ground was full an hour before the kick-off and the police ordered the gates to be closed. Several thousand people watched from the stands in the adjacent agricultural ground and many more watched from any vantage point they could find. A ceremonial kick-off was made by retired player Dally Messenger.

6 June 1932
3:00PM AEDT

Australia	6 – 8	(United Kingdom) England
Goals: Eric Weissel (3)		Tries: Alf Ellaby; Arthur Atkinson; Goals: Jim Sullivan (1)

Sydney Cricket Ground, Sydney
Attendance: 70,204
Referee: William Neill

Australia	Position	England
13. Frank McMillan	FB	1. Jim Sullivan (c)
12. Cliff Pearce	WG	9. Stanley Smith
10. Eric Weissel	CE	5. Stan Brogden
11. Fred Laws	CE	6. Arthur Atkinson
9. Joe Wilson	WG	3. Alf Ellaby
8. Ernie Norman	FE/SO	14. Ernest Pollard
7. Hector Gee	HB/SH	12. Bryn Evans
1. Herb Steinohrt (c)	PR	20. Nat Silcock
2. Jack Little	HK	15. Leslie White
3. Mick Madsen	PR	18. Joe Thompson
5. Joe Pearce	SR	21. Bill Horton
4. Dan Dempsey	SR	23. Martin Hodgson
6. Wally Prigg	LK/LF	25. Jack Feetham

The referee was former Australian player turned match official William Neill. England scored first as Alf Ellaby ran a try in from the English 25-yard (20-metre) line, Jim Sullivan missed the conversion. Australia took the lead through two penalties both taken by Eric Weissel before England scored another try, this time scored by Arthur Atkinson. Sullivan was successful with the conversion giving England an 8–4 lead. Weissel scored another penalty before half time to make the score 8–6 in England's favour.

The second half was scoreless although both sides had chances which weren't taken. The attendance figure of 70,204 set an international rugby league record for a game played anywhere until finally beaten when 73,631 saw Australia defeat Great Britain in the 1992 Rugby League World Cup final played at the old Wembley Stadium in London, England. It stands as the record international attendance for a game played in Australia, unbroken as of 2024.

=== Second test ===
The second test was played in Brisbane on 18 June 1932, two weeks after the first test. 26,000 packed into the Brisbane Cricket Ground to witness what many consider to be one of the most violent games of rugby league ever played. Many subsequent writers have named the game the Battle of Brisbane (Note: Several other games also called the Battle of Brisbane include the second test of the 1958 series, the second test of the 1966 series, the opening test of the 1970 series, and the game between England and Wales during the 1975 Rugby League World Cup.)

Before the game started the Australian manager, Harry Sunderland, went into the English dressing room with the referee to lecture the English team on how the play-the-ball was to be interpreted during the game, an act which bewildered the English players.

18 June 1932
3:00PM AEST

Australia	15 – 6	(United Kingdom) England
Tries: Hector Gee (2); Joe Wilson; Goals: Eric Weissel (2); Cliff Pearce (1)		Tries: Ernest Pollard; Stanley Smith

Brisbane Cricket Ground, Brisbane
Attendance: 26,574
Referee: Joe Simpson

Australia	Position	England
Frank McMillan	FB	Jim Sullivan (c)
Cliff Pearce	WG	Stanley Smith
Ernie Norman	CE	Stan Brogden
Fred Laws	CE	Arthur Atkinson
Joe Wilson	WG	Alf Ellaby
Eric Weissel	FE/SO	Ernest Pollard
Hector Gee	HB/SH	Les Adams
Herb Steinohrt (c)	PR	Nat Silcock
Dan Dempsey	HK	Leslie White
Mick Madsen	PR	Joe Thompson
Joe Pearce	SR	Bill Horton
Les Heidke	SR	Martin Hodgson
Frank O'Connor	LK/LF	Jack Feetham

As the game kicked off, Australia made an excellent start when Hector Gee scored a try in the first minute which Weissel converted to give Australia a 5–0 lead. At the first scrum the English prop, Joe Thompson, was knocked out and had to be carried from the pitch; as substitutions were not allowed at this date, teams had to play short until the injured players were fit to return. Within the first 10 minutes, Australia scored another try as Joe Wilson went over after a scrum near the English goal line. The conversion was missed so the score remained 8–0. England had a try disallowed and shortly before half-time Australia increased their lead to 10–0 with another Weissel penalty. During the half Thompson had returned to the pitch and the Australian centre Ernie Norman had left the pitch having been "sandwiched" by two of the English backs. The Australian winger, Cliff Pearce was knocked unconscious by the English centre, Arthur Atkinson but without any action being taken by the referee.

The second half carried on in the same vein, England scored two tries through Stanley Smith and Ernest Pollard to bring the score to 10–6 but the injury list got longer. Gee sustained a severe cut to his upper lip which required stitches, Australian lock forward Frank O'Connor and English forwards, Bill Horton and Leslie White all suffered head injuries which required stitching. With 15 minutes left Australia were reduced to only 10 men on the pitch, Gee has been stretchered off with concussion, Norman was receiving treatment for another injury and Dan Dempsey had his arm broken. Worse was to come as Weissel broke his ankle, but refused to leave the pitch. Manager, Harry Sunderland pushed both Norman and Gee back onto the field even though there weren't fit enough to rejoin. England were applying pressure with the ball but somehow a loose ball was passed to Weissel who, even with a broken ankle, managed to run 75 yards (69 m) before Sullivan tackled him just three yards from the goal line. From the play-the-ball Gee took the ball and scored a try which Pearce converted to give Australia a 15–6 lead which was how the game ended.

Even though the Australian win levelled the series at one-all, some Australian writers were highly critical of the way the game had been played by both sides. Harry Sunderland wrote in the Brisbane Courier

"I have had the pleasure of seeing 21 of those tests, (Note: This game was the 29th meeting between England and Australia) and I regret to have to admit that if we have got to study the tactics to beat England in the kind of football indulged in on Saturday, I would sooner readjust my views about possessing an enthusiasm for sport of its type. In four weeks we will have the deciding game for the "Ashes" and I must candidly admit that I would rather have Australia fail to win the coveted cup than have a repetition of some of the things I saw with the naked eye on Saturday."

although Sunderland did admit that the animosity shown during the match did not endure as he met many of the players from both teams drinking together in a nightclub that evening. "The Cynic" writing in the Referee said "It became the most desperate and rugged game imaginable. Player were left strewn like dead men on the field, or were carted off to the touch-lines to recover." M. Erskine Wyse in the Telegraph said "A few Mill's bombs and trench mortars were all that were needed in the closing stages to complete the impression of a battlefield." Most were of the opinion that the referee was not up to the standard required to officiate at a match at this level. The English press while admitting it had been a hard game were far less critical of the way the game had been played and placed much more of the blame on the match officials. English prop Joe Thompson writing for the Yorkshire Evening Post said

"There is no doubt that the second test of the 1932 tour will go down as the roughest and toughest match in the history of the game - a game full of incidents that are best forgotten.

Rugby League football in Australia is at a very low ebb at present, and if there is anything going to kill our game, it is a match of this description, where the game is forgotten, where referee and linesmen have no control over the game, with the players breaking the rules, and doing things which in England would mean their instant dismissal, but here not even a caution.

We have our troubles in England with the referee question, but I should like to say that the weakest of our referees at home is a Mussolini compared with the officials here. I have never seen such a lot of weak-kneed officials in all my career."

=== Third test ===
16 July 1932
3:00PM AEDT

Australia	13 – 18	(United Kingdom) England
Goals: Eric Weissel (5)		Tries: Stanley Smith (3); Stan Brogden; Goals: Sullivan (3)

Sydney Cricket Ground, Sydney
Attendance: 50,053
Referee: Lal Deane

Australia	Position	England
1. Frank McMillan	FB	1. Jim Sullivan (c)
2. Fred Neumann	WG	9. Stanley Smith
4. Cliff Pearce	CE	5. Stan Brogden
3. Fred Laws	CE	6. Arthur Atkinson
5. Joe Wilson	WG	3. Alf Ellaby
6. Eric Weissel	FE/SO	13. Gus Risman
7. Hector Gee	HB/SH	12. Bryn Evans
11. Herb Steinohrt (c)	PR	17. Billy Williams
12. Les Heidke	HK	15. Leslie White
13. Mick Madsen	PR	18. Joe Thompson
10. Joe Pearce	SR	22. Albert Fildes
9. Frank O'Connor	SR	23. Martin Hodgson
8. Bill Christie	LK/LF	21. Bill Horton

By contrast to the second test, the third was described as "a classic" and "one of the greatest and most exciting in these international contests".

Having won the toss and choosing to kick off Australia raced to a 9–0 lead through two penalties taken by Weissel and a try by Frank O'Connor which Weissel converted. It wasn't until late in the first half that England scored when Stanley Smith touched down for a try. At half-time the score was 9–3. For the second half England moved Gus Risman from stand off where on his debut he had not had a good first half and played Stan Brogden at stand off instead. This change unsettled the Australians who in attempting to cover Brogden often left Evans, the scum half, free to play the ball to the three-quarter line. While Australia scored first in the half, another Weissel penalty, the greater speed of the English three-quarters eventually came to the fore. Brogden was the first to score a try to make the score 11–6 to Australia. Shortly afterwards Smith raced over and with Sullivan converting the try made the score 11–11. England then took the lead 13–11 as Sullivan kicked a drop goal; Weissel then re-levelled the scores with another penalty. With under 10 minutes left to play Smith completed his hat trick with a try in the corner, with Sullivan converting the try this made the score 18–13 to England and with no further scoring England took the series 2–1 as the game ended.

== New Zealand test series ==
=== First test ===
30 July 1932
3:00PM NZDT

New Zealand	9 – 24	(United Kingdom) England
Tries: Bert Cooke; Goals: Albert Laing (3)		Tries: Arthur Atkinson (2); Alf Ellaby (2); Jack Feetham; Stanley Smith; Goals: Jim Sullivan (3)

Carlaw Park, Auckland
Attendance: 25,000
Referee: A. Harlock

New Zealand	Position	England
Albert Laing	FB	Jim Sullivan (c)
Claude List	WG	Stanley Smith
Hec Brisbane (c)	CE	Gus Risman
Dick Smith	CE	Arthur Atkinson
Len Scott	WG	Alf Ellaby
Bert Cooke	FE/SO	Stan Brogden
Jonas Masters	HB/SH	Bryn Evans
Jim Calder	PR	Nat Silcock
Neville St George	HK	John Lowe
Bob Stephenson	PR	Joe Thompson
Lou Hutt	SR	Albert Fildes
Tom Timms	SR	Martin Hodgson
Mick O'Brien	LK/LF	Jack Feetham

The opening test of the three-match series was played at Carlaw Park, Auckland on 30 July 1932, three days after England's only warm-up match. The first half saw the lead change hands on five occasions. New Zealand took a 2–0 lead through an Albert Laing penalty, England's Alf Ellaby then scored an uncoverted try for England to lead 3–2. Another Laing penalty edged Zealand in front 4–3 before Arthur Atkinson raced past three defenders to put England back in front 6–4. Bert Cooke then dummied his way through to score a try which Laing converted to make the half-time score 9–6 to New Zealand.

The second half was a different story as England scored 18 unanswered points. Almost immediately from the kick-off, Risman intercepted a pass by Hutt and the move ended with Atkinson scoring his second try. Sullivan kicked the conversion to give England the lead 11–9. Two more tries by Jack Feetham and a second for Ellaby along with two goals from Sullivan made it 21–9 to England before Smith rounded the game off with a try to make the final score 24–9.

=== Second test ===
13 August 1932
3:00PM NZDT

New Zealand	14 – 24	(United Kingdom) England
Tries: Claude List (2); Goals: Puti Watene (4)		Tries: Arthur Atkinson (2); Stan Brogden; Bill Horton; Stanley Smith; Goals: Jim Sullivan (5)

Monica Park, Christchurch
Attendance: 7,000
Referee: A. Harlock

New Zealand	Position	England
Puti Watene	FB	Jim Sullivan (c)
Claude List	WG	Stanley Smith
Hec Brisbane (c)	CE	Gus Risman
Bert Cooke	CE	Arthur Atkinson
Ben Davidson	WG	Alf Ellaby
Wilf Hassan	FE/SO	Stan Brogden
Edwin Abbott	HB/SH	Bryn Evans
Jim Calder	PR	Nat Silcock
Gordon Campbell	HK	Leslie White
Bob Stephenson	PR	Joe Thompson
Lou Hutt	SR	Albert Fildes
Ray Lawless	SR	Martin Hodgson
Jim Amos	LK/LF	Bill Horton

The second test was played in Christchurch on 13 August 1932 and was reported in the press as disappointing "the game did not reach the high standard of skill expected from the teams" was the opinion of one English reporter and "At no stage was the game very exciting" was the summary of the New Zealand Press Association reporter.

As in the first test, New Zealand took the lead. The first try was scored by Claude List but England equalised with a try by Brogden and with Sullivan's successful conversion took a 5–3 lead. The scores were levelled with a Puti Watene penalty but a converted try by Atkinson gave England a lead to 10–5 before a second List try and two goals by Watene gave New Zealand a half-time lead 12–10.

In the second half, Watene kicked another penalty but that was New Zealand's last score as tries by Smith, Horton and a second for Atkinson, all of which Sullivan converted resulted in an England victory and a 2–0 lead in the series.

=== Third test ===
20 August 1932
3:00PM NZDT

New Zealand	18 – 20	(United Kingdom) England
Tries: Hec Brisbane (2); Edwin Abbott; Bert Cooke; Goals: Puti Watene (3)		Tries: Barney Hudson; Albert Fildes; Stanley Smith; Goals: Sullivan (4)

Carlaw Park, Auckland
Attendance: 6,500
Referee: A. Harlock

New Zealand	Position	England
Puti Watene	FB	Jim Sullivan (c)
Claude List	WG	Stanley Smith
Hec Brisbane (c)	CE	Gus Risman
Bert Cooke	CE	Arthur Atkinson
Ben Davidson	WG	Alf Ellaby
Wilf Hassan	FE/SO	Stan Brogden
Edwin Abbott	HB/SH	Bryn Evans
Jim Calder	PR	Nat Silcock
Gordon Campbell	HK	Leslie White
Bob Stephenson	PR	Joe Thompson
Lou Hutt	SR	Albert Fildes
Ray Lawless	SR	Martin Hodgson
Jim Amos	LK/LF	Bill Horton

The closest game of the series was played on 20 August in Auckland. New Zealand again scored first opening up a 5–0 lead with a Puti Watene penalty and a try by Hec Brisbane before England struck back with a try by Barney Hudson with Sullivan converting. Both teams scored further tries, Brisbane's second for New Zealand and Albert Fildes for England to leave the score tied at 8–8 at half-time.

Sullivan kicked two goals early in the second half to put England in front before two tries from Bert Cooke and Edwin Abbott, one of which Watene converted put New Zealand 18–12 in front with only minutes to play. England struck back through Stanley Smith who scored a try and with Sullivan's conversion closed the score to 18–17. In the last minute of the game Hudson scored his second try of the game to give England victory.
