= 1929–30 Northern Rugby Football League season =

Rugby league football season

- League: Championship
- Teams: 28
- Champions: Huddersfield (5th title)
- League Leaders: St. Helens
- Runners-up: Leeds
- Top point-scorer: (England) Joe Thompson (243)
- Top try-scorer: (England) Alf Ellaby (39)

The 1929–30 Rugby Football League season was the 35th season of rugby league football.

== Season summary ==
Huddersfield won their fifth Championship, and their second in successive years, when they defeated Leeds 10–0 in the play–off final replay following a 2–2 draw.

St. Helens had finished the regular season as league leaders.

The Challenge Cup Winners were Widnes after beating St. Helens 10–3 in the final.

== Championship ==
Pos	Team	Pld	W	D	L	PF	PA	PAv	PCT	Qualification
1	St Helens	40	27	1	12	549	295	1.861	68.75	Qualification for the Championship play-offs
2	Huddersfield	38	25	2	11	510	317	1.609	68.42	Qualification for the Championship play-offs
3	Salford	36	23	3	10	397	214	1.855	68.06	Qualification for the Championship play-offs
4	Leeds	40	25	2	13	672	302	2.225	65.00	Qualification for the Championship play-offs
5	Dewsbury	38	23	3	12	415	282	1.472	64.47	
6	Hull Kingston Rovers	38	22	4	12	396	290	1.366	63.16	
7	Wigan	38	23	1	14	590	303	1.947	61.84	
8	Warrington	36	21	1	14	483	389	1.242	59.72	
9	Hunslet F.C.	38	21	3	14	535	358	1.494	59.21	
10	Oldham	38	20	4	14	393	306	1.284	57.89	
11	Halifax	40	21	1	18	384	348	1.103	53.75	
12	Hull	38	19	2	17	417	399	1.045	52.63	
13	St Helens Recs	36	17	3	16	355	414	0.857	51.39	
14	Swinton	36	17	2	17	332	220	1.509	50.00	
15	Widnes	32	15	2	15	309	266	1.162	50.00	
16	Wigan Highfield	32	16	0	16	257	266	0.966	50.00	
17	Wakefield Trinity	40	19	1	20	399	428	0.932	48.75	
18	Leigh	32	15	0	17	309	296	1.044	46.88	
19	York	36	16	1	19	277	328	0.845	45.83	
20	Keighley	36	14	2	20	244	427	0.571	41.67	
21	Broughton Rangers	34	14	0	20	271	437	0.620	41.18	
22	Rochdale Hornets	34	13	2	19	258	442	0.584	41.18	
23	Featherstone Rovers	36	12	3	21	255	398	0.641	37.50	
24	Bramley	36	10	5	21	199	399	0.499	34.72	
25	Barrow	32	10	2	20	352	388	0.907	34.38	
26	Castleford	36	10	2	24	230	535	0.430	30.56	
27	Batley	36	7	2	27	221	543	0.407	22.22	
28	Bradford Northern	38	7	2	29	299	718	0.416	21.05	

== Championship play-off ==
Semi-finals
1	St Helens	6
4	Leeds	10
2	Huddersfield	15
3	Salford	10

Championship final
Leeds	2	0
Huddersfield	2	10

=== Final ===
10 May 1930

Leeds	2 – 2	Huddersfield
Goals: Thompson		Goals: Stocks

Belle Vue, Wakefield
Attendance: 32,095
Referee: A. E. Harding (Broughton)

=== Replay ===
12 May 1930

Huddersfield	10 – 0	Leeds
Tries: Parker, Spencer; Goals: Stocks (2)

Thrum Hall, Halifax
Attendance: 18,563
Referee: A. E. Harding (Broughton)

Huddersfield	Number	Leeds
	Teams	
William Stocks	1	George Goldie
Ernie Mills	2	Stanley Smith
Len Bowkett	3	Tommy Askin
Gwyn Parker	4	Mel Rosser
Frank Royston	5	Frank O'Rourke
Stanley Spencer	6	Evan Williams
Ernie Thompson	7	Les Adams
John Rudd	8	Daniel Pascoe
Cyril Halliday	9	William Demaine
Sam Gee	10	Joe Thompson
Henry Tiffany	11	Arthur Thomas
Tom Banks	12	Dai Jenkins
Harold Young	13	Candy Evans

== County leagues ==
St. Helens won the Lancashire League, and Huddersfield won the Yorkshire League.

== Challenge Cup ==
Widnes beat St Helens 10–3 in the Challenge Cup Final at Wembley played before a crowd of 36,544.

This was Widnes' first Cup Final appearance and thus their first Cup Final win.

== County cups ==
Warrington beat Salford 15–2 to win the Lancashire Cup, and Hull Kingston Rovers beat Hunslet 13–7 to win the Yorkshire Cup.

== Sources ==
- 1929–30 Rugby Football League season at wigan.rlfans.com
- The Challenge Cup at The Rugby Football League website
