= Trevor Thomas (rugby) =

Wales dual-code international rugby footballer

Personal information
- Full name: William Trevor Thomas
- Born: 8 March 1907 Merthyr Tydfil, Wales
- Died: 3 February 1969 (aged 61) Sofrydd, Crumlin, Wales

Playing information

Rugby union
- Position: Flanker
Club
Years	Team	Pld	T	G	FG	P
≤1930–31	Abertillery RFC
Representative
Years	Team	Pld	T	G	FG	P
1930	Wales	1	0	0	0	0

Rugby league
- Position: Second-row
Club
Years	Team	Pld	T	G	FG	P
1931–36	Oldham	87	17	2	0	55
1936–40	Wigan	112	9	0	0	27
1939–42	Oldham	42
	Total	241	26	2	0	82
Representative
Years	Team	Pld	T	G	FG	P
1932–40	Wales	3

William Trevor Thomas (8 March 1907 – 3 February 1969), also known by the nickname of "Ocker", was a Welsh dual-code international rugby union, and professional rugby league footballer who played in the 1930s and 1940s. He played representative level rugby union (RU) for Wales, and at club level for Abertillery RFC, as a flanker, and representative level rugby league (RL) for Wales, and at club level for Oldham (two spells) (captain), and Wigan, as a second-row.

== Background ==
William "Ocker" Thomas was born in Merthyr Tydfil, Wales, and he died aged 61 in Sofrydd, Crumlin, Wales (death registered in Pontypool, Wales).

== Playing career ==
=== International honours ===
Thomas won a cap for Wales (RU) while at Abertillery RFC in 1930 against England, and won 3 caps for Wales (RL) in 1932–1940 while at Oldham, and Wigan.

=== County Cup Final appearances ===
During Thomas' time at Oldham, they had a 12–0 victory over St Helens Recs in the 1933 Lancashire Cup Final during the 1933–34 season at Station Road, Swinton on Saturday 18 November 1933. Thomas played at second-row in Wigan's 10–7 victory over Salford in the 1938 Lancashire Cup Final during the 1938–39 season at Station Road, Swinton on Saturday 22 October 1938.
