= 1930–31 Lancashire Cup =

Rugby competition in Lancashire, England

- Structure: Regional knockout championship
- Teams: 13
- Winners: St Helens Recs
- Runners-up: Wigan

The 1930–31 Lancashire Cup was the twenty-third occasion on which the Lancashire Cup competition had been held. St Helens Recs won the trophy by beating Wigan in the final by the score of 5–4.

== Competition and results ==
The number of teams entering this year's competition remained at 13 which resulted in 3 byes in the first round.

=== Round 1 ===
Involved 5 matches (with three byes) and 13 clubs

Game No	Fixture date	Home team	Score	Away team	Venue	Att	Rec	Notes	Ref
1	Sat 11 Oct 1930	Broughton Rangers	12–7	Wigan Highfield	The Cliff				
2	Sat 11 Oct 1930	Oldham	7–2	Salford	Watersheddings				
3	Sat 11 Oct 1930	Rochdale Hornets	21–9	Barrow	Athletic Grounds				
4	Sat 11 Oct 1930	Warrington	2–10	Swinton	Wilderspool				
5	Sat 11 Oct 1930	Wigan	24–7	St. Helens	Central Park				
6		Leigh		bye					
7		St Helens Recs		bye					
8		Widnes		bye					

=== Round 2 – quarterfinals ===
Involved 4 matches and 8 clubs

Game No	Fixture date	Home team	Score	Away team	Venue	Att	Rec	Notes	Ref
1	Tue 21 Oct 1930	Rochdale Hornets	3–25	Oldham	Athletic Grounds				
2	Wed 22 Oct 1930	Broughton Rangers	10–0	Widnes	The Cliff				
3	Wed 22 Oct 1930	Wigan	14–9	Swinton	Central Park				
4	Thu 23 October 1930	St Helens Recs	24–7	Leigh	City Road				

=== Round 3 – semifinals ===
Involved 2 matches and 4 clubs

Game No	Fixture date	Home team	Score	Away team	Venue	Att	Rec	Notes	Ref
1	Wed 05 Nov 1930	Broughton Rangers	0–9	Wigan	The Cliff			1	
2	Thu 06 Nov 1930	St Helens Recs	6–4	Oldham	City Road				

=== Final ===
The final was played at Station Road, Pendlebury, Salford, (historically in the county of Lancashire). The attendance was 16,710 and receipts were £1,030.

Game No	Fixture date	Home team	Score	Away team	Venue	Att	Rec	Notes	Ref
	Saturday 29 November 1930	St Helens Recs	18–3	Wigan	Station Road	16,710	£1,030	2	

==== Teams and scorers ====
St Helens Recs	No.	Wigan
	teams	
Tommy Dingsdale	1	Jim Sullivan
J. Wilson	2	Johnny Ring
W. Bowen	3	Gwynne Davies
Alf Frodsham	4	Tommy Parker
Albert Bailey	5	Roy Kinnear
W. Greenhall	6	Frank Jones
P. Martin	7	Syd Abram
Oliver Dolan	8	Tom Beetham
George Highcock	9	Jack Bennett
Frank Bowen	10	Hal Jones
T. Smith	11	Wilf Hodder
Jennion	12	Len Mason
Billy Mulvanney	13	John Sherrington
18	score	3
10	HT	0
	Scorers	
	Tries	
Dingsdale	T	Johnny Ring
Bailey	T	
Jennion (2)	T	
Mulvanney	T	
	Goals	
Dingsdale (3)	G	
	G	
	Drop Goals	
	DG	
Referee		Bob Robinson (Bradford)

Scoring – Try = three (3) points – Goal = two (2) points – Drop goal = two (2) points

=== The road to success ===
First round
St Helens Recs
bye
Leigh
bye
Rochdale Hornets	21
Barrow	9
Oldham	7
Salford	2
Wigan	24
St. Helens	7
Warrington	2
Swinton	10
Broughton Rangers	12
Wigan Highfield	7
Widnes
bye

Second round
St Helens Recs	24
Leigh	7
Rochdale Hornets	3
Oldham	25
Wigan	14
Swinton	9
Broughton Rangers	10
Widnes	0

Semifinals
St Helens Recs	6
Oldham	4
Wigan	9
Broughton Rangers	0

Final
St Helens Recs	18
Wigan	3

== Notes ==
1 * RUGBYLEAGUEproject shows Broughton Rangers as the home team with the match played at City Road but the official Wigan archives give Wigan as the home team playing at Central Park

2 * Station Road was the home ground of Swinton from 1929 to 1992 and at its peak was one of the finest rugby league grounds in the country and it boasted a capacity of 60,000. The actual record attendance was for the Challenge Cup semi-final on 7 April 1951 when 44,621 watched Wigan beat Warrington 3–2

== See also ==
- 1930–31 Northern Rugby Football League season
- List of defunct rugby league clubs
