= List of Great Britain national rugby league team results =

The following list is a complete collection of international results for the Great Britain national rugby league team.

== All–time records ==
- Results updated as of 24 December 2020.

Country	Matches	Won	Drawn	Lost	Win %	For	Aga	Diff
Aotearoa Māori	11	10	0	1	90.91%	292	125	+167
(Australia) (New Zealand) Australasia	3	0	1	2	0%	48	68	–20
Australia†	140	61	5	74	43.57%	1763	2374	–611
Fiji	1	1	0	0	100%	72	4	+68
France	75	52	4	19	69.33%	1762	796	+966
New Zealand	111	65	5	41	58.56%	2047	1622	+425
New Zealand Residents	3	1	0	2	33.33%	79	64	+15
Papua New Guinea	9	7	0	2	77.78%	298	146	+152
Rest of the World	2	2	0	0	100%	63	55	+8
South Africa	3	3	0	0	100%	133	86	+47
Tonga	1	0	0	1	0%	6	14	–8
Total	359	202	15	142	56.27%	6563	5354	+1209

- † Includes matches in 1997 against Australia (SL).

== Results ==
Date	Opponent	F	A	City	Crowd	Competition
25 January 1908	New Zealand	14	6	Leeds	8,182	1907–08 All Golds tour of Australia and Great Britain
8 February 1908	New Zealand	6	18	London	15,000	1907–08 All Golds tour of Australia and Great Britain
15 February 1908	New Zealand	5	8	Cheltenham	4,013	1907–08 All Golds tour of Australia and Great Britain
12 December 1908	Australia	22	22	London	2,000	1908–09 Kangaroo tour of Great Britain
23 January 1909	Australia	15	5	Newcastle	22,000	1908–09 Kangaroo tour of Great Britain
15 February 1909	Australia	6	5	Birmingham	9,000	1908–09 Kangaroo tour of Great Britain
18 June 1910	Australia	27	20	Sydney	42,000	1910 Lions tour of Australia and New Zealand
2 July 1910	Australia	22	17	Brisbane	18,000	1910 Lions tour of Australia and New Zealand
9 July 1910	(Australia) (New Zealand) Australasia	13	13	Sydney	50,000	1910 Lions tour of Australia and New Zealand
13 July 1910	(Australia) (New Zealand) Australasia	15	32	Sydney	50,000	1910 Lions tour of Australia and New Zealand
20 July 1910	New Zealand Māori	29	0	Nelson	2,000	1910 Lions tour of Australia and New Zealand
30 July 1910	New Zealand	52	20	Auckland	16,000	1910 Lions tour of Australia and New Zealand
8 November 1911	(Australia) (New Zealand) Australasia	10	19	Newcastle	5,317	1911–12 Kangaroo tour of Great Britain
16 December 1911	(Australia) (New Zealand) Australasia	11	11	Edinburgh	8,000	1911–12 Kangaroo tour of Great Britain
1 January 1912	Australia	8	33	Birmingham	4,000	1911–12 Kangaroo tour of Great Britain
27 June 1914	Australia	23	5	Sydney	40,000	1914 Lions tour of Australia and New Zealand
29 June 1914	Australia	7	12	Sydney	55,000	1914 Lions tour of Australia and New Zealand
4 July 1914	Australia	14	6	Sydney	34,420	1914 Lions tour of Australia and New Zealand
1 August 1914	New Zealand	16	13	Auckland	15,000	1914 Lions tour of Australia and New Zealand
26 June 1920	Australia	4	8	Brisbane	32,000	1920 Lions tour of Australia and New Zealand
3 July 1920	Australia	8	21	Sydney	40,000	1920 Lions tour of Australia and New Zealand
10 July 1920	Australia	23	13	Sydney	32,000	1920 Lions tour of Australia and New Zealand
31 July 1920	New Zealand	31	7	Auckland	34,000	1920 Lions tour of Australia and New Zealand
7 August 1920	New Zealand	19	3	Christchurch	10,000	1920 Lions tour of Australia and New Zealand
14 August 1920	New Zealand	11	10	Wellington	4,000	1920 Lions tour of Australia and New Zealand
1 October 1921	(Australia) (New Zealand) Australasia	6	5	Leeds	31,700	1921–22 Kangaroo tour of Great Britain
5 November 1921	(Australia) (New Zealand) Australasia	2	16	Hull	21,504	1921–22 Kangaroo tour of Great Britain
14 January 1922	(Australia) (New Zealand) Australasia	6	0	Salford	22,000	1921–22 Kangaroo tour of Great Britain
23 June 1924	Australia	22	3	Sydney	50,005	1924 Lions tour of Australia and New Zealand
28 June 1924	Australia	5	3	Sydney	33,842	1924 Lions tour of Australia and New Zealand
12 July 1924	Australia	11	21	Brisbane	39,000	1924 Lions tour of Australia and New Zealand
2 August 1924	New Zealand	8	16	Auckland	22,000	1924 Lions tour of Australia and New Zealand
6 August 1924	New Zealand	11	13	Wellington	6,000	1924 Lions tour of Australia and New Zealand
9 August 1924	New Zealand	31	18	Dunedin	14,000	1924 Lions tour of Australia and New Zealand
2 October 1926	New Zealand	28	20	Wigan	14,500	1926–27 Kiwi tour of Great Britain
13 November 1926	New Zealand	21	11	Hull	7,000	1926–27 Kiwi tour of Great Britain
15 January 1927	New Zealand	32	17	Leeds	6,000	1926–27 Kiwi tour of Great Britain
23 June 1928	Australia	15	12	Brisbane	39,300	1928 Lions tour of Australia and New Zealand
14 July 1928	Australia	8	0	Sydney	44,548	1928 Lions tour of Australia and New Zealand
21 July 1928	Australia	14	21	Sydney	37,380	1928 Lions tour of Australia and New Zealand
4 August 1928	New Zealand	13	17	Auckland	28,000	1928 Lions tour of Australia and New Zealand
18 August 1928	New Zealand	13	5	Dunedin	12,000	1928 Lions tour of Australia and New Zealand
25 August 1928	New Zealand	6	5	Christchurch	21,000	1928 Lions tour of Australia and New Zealand
5 October 1929	Australia	8	31	Hull	20,000	1929–30 Kangaroo tour of Great Britain
9 November 1929	Australia	9	3	Leeds	31,402	1929–30 Kangaroo tour of Great Britain
4 January 1930	Australia	0	0	Manchester	34,709	1929–30 Kangaroo tour of Great Britain
15 January 1930	Australia	3	0	Rochdale	16,743	1929–30 Kangaroo tour of Great Britain
6 June 1932	Australia	8	6	Sydney	70,204	1932 Lions tour of Australia and New Zealand
18 June 1932	Australia	6	15	Brisbane	26,574	1932 Lions tour of Australia and New Zealand
16 July 1932	Australia	18	13	Sydney	50,053	1932 Lions tour of Australia and New Zealand
30 July 1932	New Zealand	24	9	Auckland	25,000	1932 Lions tour of Australia and New Zealand
13 August 1932	New Zealand	25	14	Christchurch	5,000	1932 Lions tour of Australia and New Zealand
20 August 1932	New Zealand	20	18	Auckland	6,500	1932 Lions tour of Australia and New Zealand
7 October 1933	Australia	4	0	Manchester	34,000	1933–34 Kangaroo tour of Great Britain
11 November 1933	Australia	7	5	Leeds	29,618	1933–34 Kangaroo tour of Great Britain
16 December 1933	Australia	19	16	Manchester	10,990	1933–34 Kangaroo tour of Great Britain
29 June 1936	Australia	8	24	Sydney	63,920	1936 Lions tour of Australia and New Zealand
4 July 1936	Australia	12	7	Brisbane	29,486	1936 Lions tour of Australia and New Zealand
18 July 1936	Australia	12	7	Sydney	53,546	1936 Lions tour of Australia and New Zealand
8 August 1936	New Zealand	10	8	Auckland	25,000	1936 Lions tour of Australia and New Zealand
15 August 1936	New Zealand	23	11	Auckland	17,000	1936 Lions tour of Australia and New Zealand
16 October 1937	Australia	5	4	Leeds	31,949	1937–38 Kangaroo tour of New Zealand, Great Britain, and France
13 November 1937	Australia	13	3	Manchester	31,724	1937–38 Kangaroo tour of New Zealand, Great Britain, and France
18 December 1937	Australia	3	13	Huddersfield	9,403	1937–38 Kangaroo tour of New Zealand, Great Britain, and France
30 September 1939	New Zealand	C	C	Manchester	N/A	1939 Kiwi tour of Great Britain and France
17 June 1946	Australia	8	8	Sydney	64,527	1946 Lions tour of Australia and New Zealand
6 July 1946	Australia	14	5	Brisbane	40,500	1946 Lions tour of Australia and New Zealand
20 July 1946	Australia	20	7	Sydney	35,294	1946 Lions tour of Australia and New Zealand
10 August 1946	New Zealand	8	13	Auckland	11,000	1946 Lions tour of Australia and New Zealand
31 August 1946	New Zealand Māori	32	8	Wellington	12,000	1946 Lions tour of Australia and New Zealand
4 October 1947	New Zealand	11	10	Leeds	28,445	1947–48 Kiwi tour of Great Britain and France
8 November 1947	New Zealand	7	10	Manchester	29,031	1947–48 Kiwi tour of Great Britain and France
20 December 1947	New Zealand	25	9	Bradford	42,685	1947–48 Kiwi tour of Great Britain and France
9 October 1948	Australia	23	21	Leeds	36,529	1948–49 Kangaroo tour of Great Britain and France
6 November 1948	Australia	16	7	Manchester	36,354	1948–49 Kangaroo tour of Great Britain and France
29 January 1949	Australia	23	9	Bradford	36,294	1948–49 Kangaroo tour of Great Britain and France
12 June 1950	Australia	6	4	Sydney	47,275	1950 Lions tour of Australia and New Zealand
1 July 1950	Australia	3	15	Brisbane	35,000	1950 Lions tour of Australia and New Zealand
22 July 1950	Australia	2	5	Sydney	47,178	1950 Lions tour of Australia and New Zealand
29 July 1950	New Zealand	10	16	Christchurch	10,000	1950 Lions tour of Australia and New Zealand
12 August 1950	New Zealand	13	20	Auckland	20,000	1950 Lions tour of Australia and New Zealand
6 October 1951	New Zealand	21	15	Bradford	37,475	1951–52 Kiwi tour of Great Britain and France
10 November 1951	New Zealand	20	19	Manchester	29,938	1951–52 Kiwi tour of Great Britain and France
15 December 1951	New Zealand	16	12	Leeds	18,649	1951–52 Kiwi tour of Great Britain and France
22 May 1952	France	12	22	Paris	Unknown	Friendly
4 October 1952	Australia	19	6	Leeds	34,505	1952–53 Kangaroo tour of Great Britain and France
9 November 1952	Australia	21	5	Manchester	32,421	1952–53 Kangaroo tour of Great Britain and France
13 December 1952	Australia	7	27	Bradford	30,509	1952–53 Kangaroo tour of Great Britain and France
24 May 1953	France	17	28	Lyon	6,000	Friendly
27 April 1954	France	17	8	Bradford	14,153	Friendly
12 June 1954	Australia	12	37	Sydney	65,884	1954 Lions tour of Australia and New Zealand
3 July 1954	Australia	38	21	Brisbane	46,355	1954 Lions tour of Australia and New Zealand
17 July 1954	Australia	16	20	Sydney	67,577	1954 Lions tour of Australia and New Zealand
21 July 1954	New Zealand Māori	14	4	Auckland	1,728	1954 Lions tour of Australia and New Zealand
24 July 1954	New Zealand	27	7	Auckland	22,097	1954 Lions tour of Australia and New Zealand
31 July 1954	New Zealand	14	20	Greymouth	4,240	1954 Lions tour of Australia and New Zealand
14 August 1954	New Zealand	12	6	Auckland	6,186	1954 Lions tour of Australia and New Zealand
31 October 1954	Australia	28	13	Lyon	10,250	1954 World Cup
7 November 1954	France	13	13	Toulouse	37,471	1954 World Cup
11 November 1954	New Zealand	26	6	Bordeaux	14,000	1954 World Cup
13 November 1954	France	16	12	Paris	30,368	1954 World Cup
8 October 1955	New Zealand	25	6	Manchester	21,937	1955–1956 Kiwi tour of Great Britain and France
12 November 1955	New Zealand	27	12	Bradford	24,443	1955–1956 Kiwi tour of Great Britain and France
11 December 1955	France	5	17	Paris	18,000	Friendly
17 December 1955	New Zealand	13	28	Leeds	10,438	1955–56 Kiwi tour of Great Britain and France
11 April 1956	France	28	10	Bradford	10,453	Friendly
17 November 1956	Australia	21	10	Wigan	22,473	1956–57 Kangaroo tour of Great Britain and France
1 December 1956	Australia	9	22	Bradford	23,634	1956–57 Kangaroo tour of Great Britain and France
15 December 1956	Australia	19	0	Manchester	17,542	1956–57 Kangaroo tour of Great Britain and France
26 January 1957	France	45	12	Leeds	20,221	Friendly
3 March 1957	France	19	19	Toulouse	16,000	Friendly
10 April 1957	France	29	14	St Helens	23,250	Friendly
15 April 1957	France	23	5	Sydney	50,077	1957 World Cup
17 April 1957	Australia	6	31	Sydney	58,655	1957 World Cup
25 April 1957	New Zealand	21	29	Sydney	14,263	1957 World Cup
3 November 1957	France	25	14	Toulouse	15,762	Two-match series friendly
23 November 1957	France	44	15	Wigan	19,152	Two-match series friendly
2 March 1958	France	23	9	Grenoble	20,000	Friendly
14 June 1958	Australia	8	25	Sydney	68,777	1958 Lions tour of Australia and New Zealand
5 July 1958	Australia	25	18	Brisbane	33,563	1958 Lions tour of Australia and New Zealand
19 July 1958	Australia	40	17	Sydney	68,720	1958 Lions tour of Australia and New Zealand
23 July 1958	New Zealand Māori	59	7	Huntly	5,000	1958 Lions tour of Australia and New Zealand
26 July 1958	New Zealand	10	15	Auckland	25,000	1958 Lions tour of Australia and New Zealand
9 August 1958	New Zealand	32	15	Auckland	25,000	1958 Lions tour of Australia and New Zealand
14 March 1959	France	50	15	Leeds	21,948	Two-match series friendly
5 April 1959	France	15	24	Grenoble	8,500	Two-match series friendly
17 October 1959	Australia	14	22	Manchester	35,224	1959–60 Kangaroo tour of Great Britain, France, and Italy
21 November 1959	Australia	11	10	Leeds	30,301	1959–60 Kangaroo tour of Great Britain, France, and Italy
12 December 1959	Australia	18	12	Wigan	26,089	1959–60 Kangaroo tour of Great Britain, France, and Italy
6 March 1960	France	18	20	Toulouse	15,308	Two-match series friendly
26 March 1960	France	17	17	St Helens	13,165	Two-match series friendly
24 September 1960	New Zealand	23	8	Bradford	20,577	1960 World Cup
1 October 1960	France	33	7	Manchester	22,293	1960 World Cup
8 October 1960	Australia	10	3	Bradford	32,773	1960 World Cup
10 October 1960	Rest of the World	33	27	Bradford	3,908	Friendly
11 December 1960	France	21	10	Bordeaux	5,127	Two-match series friendly
28 January 1961	France	27	8	St Helens	14,804	Two-match series friendly
30 September 1961	New Zealand	11	29	Leeds	16,540	1961 Kiwi tour of Great Britain and France
21 October 1961	New Zealand	23	10	Bradford	19,980	1961 Kiwi tour of Great Britain and France
4 November 1961	New Zealand	35	19	Manchester	22,558	1961 Kiwi tour of Great Britain and France
17 February 1962	France	15	20	Wigan	17,277	Two-match series friendly
11 March 1962	France	13	23	Perpignan	12,500	Two-match series friendly
9 June 1962	Australia	31	12	Sydney	70,174	1962 Lions tour of Australia, New Zealand, and South Africa
30 June 1962	Australia	17	10	Brisbane	34,766	1962 Lions tour of Australia, New Zealand, and South Africa
14 July 1962	Australia	17	18	Sydney	42,104	1962 Lions tour of Australia, New Zealand, and South Africa
28 July 1962	New Zealand	0	19	Auckland	14,976	1962 Lions tour of Australia, New Zealand, and South Africa
31 July 1962	New Zealand Māori	35	5	Wellington	3,091	1962 Lions tour of Australia, New Zealand, and South Africa
11 August 1962	New Zealand	8	27	Auckland	16,411	1962 Lions tour of Australia, New Zealand, and South Africa
23 August 1962	South Africa	49	30	Pretoria	Unknown	1962 Lions tour of Australia, New Zealand, and South Africa
25 August 1962	South Africa	39	33	Durban	Unknown	1962 Lions tour of Australia, New Zealand, and South Africa
31 August 1962	South Africa	45	23	Johannesburg	Unknown	1962 Lions tour of Australia, New Zealand, and South Africa
2 December 1962	France	12	17	Perpignan	12,500	Two-match series friendly
3 April 1963	France	42	4	Wigan	19,487	Two-match series friendly
16 October 1963	Australia	2	28	London	13,946	1963–64 Kangaroo tour of Great Britain and France
9 November 1963	Australia	12	50	Manchester	30,843	1963–64 Kangaroo tour of Great Britain and France
30 November 1963	Australia	16	5	Leeds	20,497	1963–64 Kangaroo tour of Great Britain and France
8 March 1964	France	11	5	Perpignan	4,326	Two-match series friendly
18 March 1964	France	39	0	Leigh	4,750	Two-match series friendly
6 December 1964	France	8	18	Perpignan	7,150	Two-match series friendly
23 January 1965	France	17	7	Manchester	9,959	Two-match series friendly
25 September 1965	New Zealand	7	2	Manchester	8,541	1965 Kiwi tour of Great Britain and France
23 October 1965	New Zealand	15	9	Bradford	15,849	1965 Kiwi tour of Great Britain and France
6 November 1965	New Zealand	9	9	Wigan	7,919	1965 Kiwi tour of Great Britain and France
16 January 1966	France	13	18	Perpignan	7,255	Two-match series friendly
5 March 1966	France	4	8	Wigan	14,004	Two-match series friendly
25 June 1966	Australia	17	13	Sydney	57,962	1966 Lions tour of Australia and New Zealand
16 July 1966	Australia	4	6	Brisbane	45,057	1966 Lions tour of Australia and New Zealand
23 July 1966	Australia	14	19	Sydney	63,503	1966 Lions tour of Australia and New Zealand
6 August 1966	New Zealand	25	8	Auckland	14,494	1966 Lions tour of Australia and New Zealand
20 August 1966	New Zealand	22	14	Auckland	10,657	1966 Lions tour of Australia and New Zealand
22 January 1967	France	16	13	Carcassonne	10,650	Two-match series friendly
4 March 1967	France	13	23	Wigan	7,448	Two-match series friendly
21 October 1967	Australia	16	11	Leeds	Unknown	1967–68 Kangaroo tour of Great Britain and France
3 November 1967	Australia	11	17	London	17,445	1967–68 Kangaroo tour of Great Britain and France
9 December 1967	Australia	3	11	Manchester	13,615	1967–68 Kangaroo tour of Great Britain and France
11 February 1968	France	22	13	Paris	5,500	Two-match series friendly
2 March 1968	France	19	8	Bradford	14,196	Two-match series friendly
25 May 1968	Australia	10	25	Sydney	62,256	1968 World Cup
2 June 1968	France	2	7	Auckland	15,760	1968 World Cup
8 June 1968	New Zealand	38	14	Sydney	14,105	1968 World Cup
30 November 1968	France	34	10	St Helens	6,080	Two-match series friendly
2 February 1969	France	9	13	Toulouse	15,536	Two-match series friendly
6 June 1970	Australia	15	37	Brisbane	42,807	1970 Lions tour of Australia and New Zealand
20 June 1970	Australia	28	7	Sydney	60,962	1970 Lions tour of Australia and New Zealand
4 July 1970	Australia	21	17	Sydney	61,258	1970 Lions tour of Australia and New Zealand
11 July 1970	New Zealand	19	15	Auckland	15,948	1970 Lions tour of Australia and New Zealand
19 July 1970	New Zealand	23	9	Christchurch	8,600	1970 Lions tour of Australia and New Zealand
25 July 1970	New Zealand	33	16	Auckland	13,137	1970 Lions tour of Australia and New Zealand
24 October 1970	Australia	11	4	Leeds	15,169	1970 World Cup
28 October 1970	France	6	0	Castleford	8,958	1970 World Cup
31 October 1970	New Zealand	27	17	Manchester	5,609	1970 World Cup
7 November 1970	Australia	7	12	Leeds	18,776	1970 World Cup
7 February 1971	France	8	16	Toulouse	14,960	Two-match series friendly
17 March 1971	France	24	2	St Helens	7,783	Two-match series friendly
25 September 1971	New Zealand	13	18	Salford	3,764	1971 Kiwi tour of Great Britain and France
16 October 1971	New Zealand	14	17	Castleford	4,108	1971 Kiwi tour of Great Britain and France
6 November 1971	New Zealand	12	3	Leeds	5,479	1971 Kiwi tour of Great Britain and France
6 February 1972	France	10	9	Toulouse	11,508	Two-match series friendly
12 March 1972	France	45	10	Bradford	7,313	Two-match series friendly
29 October 1972	Australia	27	21	Perpignan	6,324	1972 World Cup
1 November 1972	France	13	4	Grenoble	5,321	1972 World Cup
4 November 1972	New Zealand	53	19	Pau	7,500	1972 World Cup
11 November 1972	Australia	10	10	Lyon	4,231	1972 World Cup
3 November 1973	Australia	21	12	London	9,874	1973 Kangaroo tour of Great Britain and France
24 November 1973	Australia	6	14	Leeds	16,674	1973 Kangaroo tour of Great Britain and France
1 December 1973	Australia	5	15	Warrington	10,019	1973 Kangaroo tour of Great Britain and France
20 January 1974	France	24	5	Grenoble	4,100	Two-match series friendly
17 February 1974	France	29	0	Wigan	9,108	Two-match series friendly
15 June 1974	Australia	6	12	Brisbane	30,280	1974 Lions tour of Australia and New Zealand
6 July 1974	Australia	16	11	Sydney	48,006	1974 Lions tour of Australia and New Zealand
20 July 1974	Australia	18	22	Sydney	55,505	1974 Lions tour of Australia and New Zealand
27 July 1974	New Zealand	8	13	Auckland	10,466	1974 Lions tour of Australia and New Zealand
30 July 1974	New Zealand Māori	19	16	Rotorua	4,000	1974 Lions tour of Australia and New Zealand
4 August 1974	New Zealand	17	8	Christchurch	6,316	1974 Lions tour of Australia and New Zealand
10 August 1974	New Zealand	20	0	Auckland	11,574	1974 Lions tour of Australia and New Zealand
5 June 1977	France	23	4	Auckland	10,000	1977 World Cup
12 June 1977	New Zealand	30	12	Christchurch	7,000	1977 World Cup
18 June 1977	Australia	5	19	Brisbane	27,000	1977 World Cup
25 June 1977	Australia	12	13	Sydney	24,457	1977 World Cup
21 October 1978	Australia	9	15	Wigan	17,644	1978 Kangaroo tour of Great Britain and France
5 November 1978	Australia	18	14	Bradford	26,761	1978 Kangaroo tour of Great Britain and France
18 November 1978	Australia	6	23	Leeds	30,604	1978 Kangaroo tour of Great Britain and France
16 June 1979	Australia	0	35	Brisbane	23,051	1979 Lions tour of Australia and New Zealand
30 June 1979	Australia	16	24	Sydney	26,857	1979 Lions tour of Australia and New Zealand
14 July 1979	Australia	2	28	Sydney	16,844	1979 Lions tour of Australia and New Zealand
21 July 1979	New Zealand	16	8	Auckland	9,000	1979 Lions tour of Australia and New Zealand
17 July 1979	New Zealand Māori	15	13	Whangārei	5,000	1979 Lions tour of Australia and New Zealand
5 August 1979	New Zealand	22	7	Christchurch	8,500	1979 Lions tour of Australia and New Zealand
11 August 1979	New Zealand	11	18	Auckland	7,000	1979 Lions tour of Australia and New Zealand
18 October 1980	New Zealand	14	14	Wigan	7,031	1980 Kiwi tour of Great Britain and France
2 November 1980	New Zealand	8	12	Bradford	10,946	1980 Kiwi tour of Great Britain and France
15 November 1980	New Zealand	10	2	Leeds	8,210	1980 Kiwi tour of Great Britain and France
6 December 1981	France	37	0	Hull	13,173	Two-match series friendly
20 December 1981	France	2	19	Marseille	6,500	Two-match series friendly
30 October 1982	Australia	4	40	Hull	26,771	1982 Kangaroo tour of Great Britain and France
20 November 1982	Australia	6	27	Wigan	23,126	1982 Kangaroo tour of Great Britain and France
28 November 1982	Australia	8	32	Leeds	17,318	1982 Kangaroo tour of Great Britain and France
20 February 1983	France	20	5	Carcassonne	3,826	Two-match series friendly
6 March 1983	France	17	5	Hull	6,055	Two-match series friendly
29 January 1984	France	12	0	Avignon	4,000	Two-match series friendly
17 February 1984	France	10	0	Leeds	7,646	Two-match series friendly
9 June 1984	Australia	8	25	Sydney	30,190	1984 Lions tour of Australia, Papua New Guinea, and New Zealand
26 June 1984	Australia	6	18	Brisbane	26,534	1984 Lions tour of Australia, Papua New Guinea, and New Zealand
7 July 1984	Australia	7	20	Sydney	18,756	1984 Lions tour of Australia, Papua New Guinea, and New Zealand
14 July 1984	New Zealand	0	12	Auckland	10,238	1984 Lions tour of Australia, Papua New Guinea, and New Zealand
15 July 1984	New Zealand Māori	19	8	Huntly	2,392	1984 Lions tour of Australia, Papua New Guinea, and New Zealand
22 July 1984	New Zealand	12	28	Christchurch	9,824	1984 Lions tour of Australia, Papua New Guinea, and New Zealand
28 July 1984	New Zealand	16	32	Auckland	7,967	1984 Lions tour of Australia, Papua New Guinea, and New Zealand
5 August 1984	Papua New Guinea	38	20	Mount Hagen	7,510	1984 Lions tour of Australia, Papua New Guinea, and New Zealand
1 March 1985	France	50	4	Leeds	6,491	Two-match series friendly
17 March 1985	France	16	24	Perpignan	5,000	Two-match series friendly
19 October 1985	New Zealand	22	24	Leeds	12,591	1985 Kiwi tour of Great Britain and France
2 November 1985	New Zealand	25	8	Wigan	15,506	1985 Kiwi tour of Great Britain and France
9 November 1985	New Zealand	6	6	Leeds	22,209	1985–1988 World Cup
16 February 1986	France	10	10	Avignon	4,000	1985–1988 World Cup
1 March 1986	France	24	10	Wigan	8,112	Friendly
25 October 1986	Australia	16	38	Trafford	50,583	1986 Kangaroo tour of Great Britain and France
8 November 1986	Australia	4	34	Leeds	30,808	1986 Kangaroo tour of Great Britain and France
22 November 1986	Australia	15	24	Wigan	20,169	1985–1988 World Cup
24 January 1987	France	52	4	Leeds	6,567	1985–1988 World Cup
8 February 1987	France	20	10	Carcassonne	2,000	Friendly
24 October 1987	Papua New Guinea	42	0	Wigan	9,121	1985–1988 World Cup
24 January 1988	France	28	14	Avignon	6,000	Two-match series friendly
6 February 1988	France	30	12	Leeds	7,007	Two-match series friendly
22 May 1988	Papua New Guinea	42	22	Port Moresby	12,107	1985–1988 World Cup
11 June 1988	Australia	6	17	Sydney	24,480	1988 Lions tour of Australia, Papua New Guinea, and New Zealand
28 June 1988	Australia	14	34	Brisbane	27,130	1988 Lions tour of Australia, Papua New Guinea, and New Zealand
9 July 1988	Australia	26	12	Sydney	15,944	1988 Lions tour of Australia, Papua New Guinea, and New Zealand
17 July 1988	New Zealand	10	12	Christchurch	8,525	1985–1988 World Cup
29 October 1988	Rest of the World	30	28	Leeds	12,409	Friendly
21 January 1989	France	26	10	Wigan	8,266	Two-match series friendly
5 February 1989	France	30	8	Avignon	6,500	Two-match series friendly
21 October 1989	New Zealand	16	24	Trafford	18,273	1989 Kiwi tour of Great Britain and France
28 October 1989	New Zealand	26	6	Leeds	13,000	1989 Kiwi tour of Great Britain and France
11 November 1989	New Zealand	10	6	Wigan	20,346	1989–1992 World Cup

=== 1990s ===
Date	Home	Score	Away	Competition	Location	Attendance
18 March 1990	France	4–8	Great Britain	Two-match series friendly	Stade Gilbert Brutus, Perpignan	6,000
7 April 1990	Great Britain	25–18	France	Two-match series friendly	Headingley, Leeds	6,554
27 May 1990	Papua New Guinea	20–18	Great Britain	1990 Lions tour of Australia and New Zealand	Danny Leahy Oval, Goroka	11,598
2 June 1990	Papua New Guinea	8–40	Great Britain	1989–1992 World Cup	Lloyd Robson Oval, Port Moresby	7,837
24 June 1990	New Zealand	10–11	Great Britain	1990 Lions tour of Australia and New Zealand	Palmerston North Showgrounds, Palmerston North	8,073
1 July 1990	Māori	12–20	Great Britain	1990 Lions tour of Australia and New Zealand	Rotorua International Stadium, Rotorua	4,500
8 July 1990	New Zealand	14–16	Great Britain	1990 Lions tour of Australia and New Zealand	Mount Smart Stadium, Auckland	7,843
15 July 1990	New Zealand	21–18	Great Britain	1989–1992 World Cup	Queen Elizabeth II Park, Christchurch	3,133
27 October 1990	Great Britain	19–12	Australia	1990 Kangaroo tour of Great Britain and France	Wembley Stadium, London	54,569
10 November 1990	Great Britain	10–14	Australia	1990 Kangaroo tour of Great Britain and France	Old Trafford, Manchester	46,615
24 November 1990	Great Britain	0–14	Australia	1990 Kangaroo tour of Great Britain and France	Elland Road, Leeds	32,500
27 January 1991	France	10–45	Great Britain	1989–1992 World Cup	Stade Gilbert Brutus, Perpignan	3,965
16 February 1991	France	4–60	Great Britain	Friendly	Headingley, Leeds	5,284
9 November 1991	Great Britain	56–4	Papua New Guinea	1989–1992 World Cup	Central Park, Wigan	4,193
16 February 1992	France	12–30	Great Britain	Friendly	Stade Gilbert Brutus, Perpignan	5,688
7 March 1992	Great Britain	36–0	France	1989–1992 World Cup	The Boulevard, Hull	5,250
31 May 1992	Papua New Guinea	14–20	Great Britain	1992 Lions tour of Australia, Papua New Guinea, and New Zealand	Port Moresby	7,294
12 June 1992	Australia	22–6	Great Britain	1992 Lions tour of Australia, Papua New Guinea, and New Zealand	Sydney	40,141
26 June 1992	Australia	10–33	Great Britain	1992 Lions tour of Australia, Papua New Guinea, and New Zealand	Melbourne	31,005
3 July 1992	Australia	16–10	Great Britain	1989–1992 World Cup	Brisbane	32,313
12 July 1992	New Zealand	15–14	Great Britain	1992 Lions tour of Australia, Papua New Guinea, and New Zealand	Palmerston North	11,548
19 July 1992	New Zealand	16–19	Great Britain	1992 Lions tour of Australia, Papua New Guinea, and New Zealand	Auckland	10,223
24 October 1992	Great Britain	6–10	Australia	1989–1992 World Cup	London	73,631
7 March 1993	France	6–48	Great Britain	Two-match series friendly	Carcassonne	5,500
2 April 1993	Great Britain	72–6	France	Two-match series friendly	Headingley, Leeds	8,196
16 October 1993	Great Britain	17–0	New Zealand	1993 Kiwi tour of Great Britain and France	Wembley Stadium, London	36,131
30 October 1993	Great Britain	29–12	New Zealand	1993 Kiwi tour of Great Britain and France	Central Park, Wigan	16,502
6 November 1993	Great Britain	29–10	New Zealand	1993 Kiwi tour of Great Britain and France	Headingley, Leeds	15,139
20 March 1994	France	4–12	Great Britain	Friendly	Carcassonne	7,000
22 October 1994	Great Britain	8–4	Australia	1994 Kangaroo tour of Great Britain and France	Wembley Stadium, London	57,034
5 November 1994	Great Britain	8–38	Australia	1994 Kangaroo tour of Great Britain and France	Old Trafford Manchester	43,930
20 November 1994	Great Britain	4–23	Australia	1994 Kangaroo tour of Great Britain and France	Elland Road, Leeds	39,468
28 September 1996	Papua New Guinea	30–32	Great Britain	1996 Lions tour of Fiji, Papua New Guinea, and New Zealand	Lae	10,000
5 October 1996	Fiji	4–72	Great Britain	1996 Lions tour of Fiji, Papua New Guinea, and New Zealand	Nadi	5,000
18 October 1996	New Zealand	17–12	Great Britain	1996 Lions tour of Fiji, Papua New Guinea, and New Zealand	Auckland	12,000
22 October 1996	Māori	28–40	Great Britain	1996 Lions tour of Fiji, Papua New Guinea, and New Zealand	Whangārei	6,000
25 October 1996	New Zealand	18–15	Great Britain	1996 Lions tour of Fiji, Papua New Guinea, and New Zealand	Palmerston North	12,000
1 November 1996	New Zealand	32–12	Great Britain	1996 Lions tour of Fiji, Papua New Guinea, and New Zealand	Christchurch	9,000
1 November 1997	Great Britain	14–38	Australia	1997 Super League Series	Wembley Stadium, London	41,135
8 November 1997	Great Britain	20–12	Australia	1997 Super League Series	Old Trafford, Manchester	40,324
16 November 1997	Great Britain	20–37	Australia	1997 Super League Series	Elland Road, Leeds	39,337
31 October 1998	Great Britain	16–22	New Zealand	1998 Kiwi tour of Great Britain	Kirklees Stadium, Huddersfield	18,500
7 October 1998	Great Britain	16–36	New Zealand	1998 Kiwi tour of Great Britain	Reebok Stadium, Bolton	27,486
14 October 1998	Great Britain	23–23	New Zealand	1998 Kiwi tour of Great Britain	Vicarage Road, Watford	13,217
22 October 1999	Australia	42–6	Great Britain	1999 tri-Nations	Lang Park, Brisbane	12,511
29 October 1999	New Zealand	26–4	Great Britain	1999 tri-Nations	Mount Smart Stadium, Auckland	14,040

=== 2000s ===
Date	Home	Score	Away	Competition	Location	Attendance
26 October 2001	France	12–42	Great Britain	Friendly	Agen	10,000
5 November 1999	Māori	12–22	Great Britain	Friendly	Auckland	21,204
11 November 2001	Great Britain	20–12	Australia	2001 Kangaroo tour of Great Britain	Kirklees Stadium, Huddersfield	21,758
17 November 2001	Great Britain	12–40	Australia	2001 Kangaroo tour of Great Britain	Bolton Stadium, Bolton	22,152
24 November 2001	Great Britain	8–28	Australia	2001 Kangaroo tour of Great Britain	DW Stadium, Wigan	25,011
12 July 2002	Australia	64–10	Great Britain	Friendly	Sydney	31,844
9 November 2002	Great Britain	16–30	New Zealand	2002 Kiwi tour of Great Britain and France	Ewood Park, Blackburn	16,654
16 November 2002	Great Britain	14–14	New Zealand	2002 Kiwi tour of Great Britain and France	Kirklees Stadium, Huddersfield	23,604
23 November 2002	Great Britain	16–10	New Zealand	2002 Kiwi tour of Great Britain and France	DW Stadium, Wigan	22,247
8 November 2003	Great Britain	18–22	Australia	2003 Kangaroo tour of Great Britain	DW Stadium, Wigan	24,614
15 November 2003	Great Britain	20–23	Australia	2003 Kangaroo tour of Great Britain	KC Stadium, Hull	25,147
22 November 2003	Great Britain	12–18	Australia	2003 Kangaroo tour of Great Britain	Kirklees Stadium, Huddersfield	24,126
30 October 2004	Great Britain	8–12	Australia	2004 Tri-Nations	City of Manchester Stadium, Manchester	38,572
6 November 2004	Great Britain	22–12	New Zealand	2004 Tri-Nations	Kirklees Stadium, Huddersfield	20,372
13 November 2004	Great Britain	24–12	Australia	2004 Tri-Nations	DW Stadium, Wigan	25,004
20 November 2004	Great Britain	26–24	New Zealand	2004 Tri-Nations	KC Stadium, Hull	23,377
27 November 2004	Great Britain	4–44	Australia	2004 Tri-Nations	Elland Road, Leeds	39,120
30 October 2005	Great Britain	26–42	New Zealand	2005 Tri-Nations	Loftus Road, London	15,568
6 October 2005	Great Britain	6–20	Australia	2005 Tri-Nations	DW Stadium, Wigan	25,004
12 October 2005	Great Britain	38–12	New Zealand	2005 Tri-Nations	Kirklees Stadium, Huddersfield	19,232
19 October 2005	Great Britain	14–26	Australia	2005 Tri-Nations	KC Stadium, Hull	25,150
28 June 2006	Great Britain	46–14	New Zealand	Friendley	Knowsley Road, St Helens	10,103
28 October 2006	Great Britain	14–18	New Zealand	2006 Tri-Nations	Jade Stadium, Christchurch	17,005
4 November 2006	Australia	23–12	Great Britain	2006 Tri-Nations	Sydney Football Stadium, Sydney	24,953
11 November 2006	New Zealand	34–4	Great Britain	2006 Tri-Nations	Wellington Regional Stadium, Wellington	16,401
18 November 2006	Australia	33–10	Great Britain	2006 Tri-Nations	Lang Park, Brisbane	44,358
22 June 2007	Great Britain	42–14	France	Friendley	Headingley Stadium, Leeds	12,685
27 October 2007	Great Britain	20–14	New Zealand	2007 All Golds tour of Great Britain and France	Kirklees Stadium, Huddersfield	16,522
3 November 2007	Great Britain	44–0	New Zealand	2007 All Golds tour of Great Britain and France	KC Stadium, Hull	20,324
10 November 2007	Great Britain	28–22	New Zealand	2007 All Golds tour of Great Britain and France	DW Stadium, Wigan	21,235

=== 2010s ===
Date	Home	Score	Away	Competition	Location	Attendance
26 October 2019	Tonga	14–6	Great Britain	2019 Lions tour of Papua New Guinea and New Zealand	Hamilton	9,420
2 November 2019	New Zealand	12–8	Great Britain	2019 Lions tour of Papua New Guinea and New Zealand	Auckland	25,257
9 November 2019	New Zealand	23–8	Great Britain	2019 Lions tour of Papua New Guinea and New Zealand	Christchurch	8,875
16 November 2019	Papua New Guinea	28–10	Great Britain	2019 Lions tour of Papua New Guinea and New Zealand	Port Moresby	Unknown

== See also ==
- Rugby league in the British Isles
- List of Great Britain national rugby league team players
- List of Great Britain national rugby league team tours
