= Frank Bowen =

Frank Bowen may refer to:

- Frank Bowen (rugby league) (1896–c.1964), English rugby league player
- Frank S. Bowen (1905–1976), United States Army general
