= Ernest Shaw =

England international rugby league footballer

Ernie Shaw
Personal information
- Full name: Ernest Shaw
- Born: 7 October 1894 Runcorn, England
- Died: 8 October 1973 (aged 79)

Playing information
- Position: Fullback, Centre, Prop, Hooker, Second-row, Loose forward
Club
Years	Team	Pld	T	G	FG	P
1919–22	Wigan	106	31	1	0	101
1922–30	St. Helens	259	57	47	0	265
	Total	365	88	48	0	366
Representative
Years	Team	Pld	T	G	FG	P
1921	England	2	0	0	0	0

Ernest Shaw (7 October 1894 – 8 October 1973) was an English professional rugby league footballer who played in the 1910s, 1920s and 1930s. He played at representative level for England, and at club level for Wigan and St Helens, as a fullback, centre, prop, hooker, second-row, or loose forward.

== Background ==
Ernie Shaw's birth was registered in Runcorn, Cheshire, England. He died on 8 October 1973, aged 79.

== Playing career ==
=== Wigan ===
Shaw made his début for Wigan in the 8–8 draw with Swinton at Central Park, Wigan on Saturday 6 September 1919, scored his first try in the 3–18 defeat by Barrow at Little Park Roose, Barrow-in-Furness on Saturday 13 December 1919, scored his last try in the 27–8 victory over Hull F.C. in the Rugby Football League Championship semi-final at Central Park, Wigan on Saturday 22 April 1922, and he played his last match for Wigan in the 23–2 victory over Widnes at Central Park, Wigan on Saturday 30 September 1922,

Shaw played second-row in Wigan's 13–2 victory over Oldham in the Championship Final during the 1921–22 season at The Cliff, Broughton on Saturday 6 May 1922.

Shaw played in Wigan's victory in the Lancashire County League during the 1920–21 season.

=== St Helens ===
In 1922, Shaw was transferred for £300 (based on increases in average earnings, this would be approximately £53,190 in 2013), and he made his début for St. Helens in the 14–21 defeat by Warrington at Wilderspool Stadium, Warrington on Saturday 7 October 1922, scored his first try in the 12–26 defeat by Leigh at Mather Lane, Leigh on Saturday 4 November 1922, scored his first conversion in the 73–0 victory over Wardley ARLFC (in Wardley, Manchester) on Saturday 16 February 1924, scored his last conversion in the 7–14 defeat by Broughton Rangers at The Cliff, Broughton, Salford on Tuesday 30 April 1929, scored his last try in the 13–19 defeat by Halifax at Thrum Hall, Halifax on Saturday 5 October 1929, and he played his last match for St. Helens in the 15–11 victory over Batley at Mount Pleasant, Batley on 17 April 1930.

Shaw played loose forward in St. Helens' 10–2 victory over St Helens Recs in the 1926–27 Lancashire Cup Final during the 1926–27 season at Wilderspool Stadium, Warrington on Saturday 20 November 1926.

=== International honours ===
Shaw won caps for England while at Wigan in 1921 against Wales, and Other Nationalities.
