= Nat Silcock Sr. =

Former Great Britain and England international rugby league footballer

Nat Silcock
Personal information
- Full name: Nathan Silcock
- Born: 25 December 1903 West Derby, (Liverpool), Lancashire, England
- Died: fourth ¼ 1967 (aged 63–64) Widnes, England

Playing information
- Position: Prop, Second-row
Club
Years	Team	Pld	T	G	FG	P
1922–39	Widnes	434	42	0	0	126
Representative
Years	Team	Pld	T	G	FG	P
	Lancashire
1934–35	Rugby League XIII	2	1	0	0	3
1932–36	England	3	3	0	0	9
1932–37	Great Britain	12	1	0	0	3
- Relatives: Nat Silcock Jr. (son)

Nathan Silcock (25 December 1903 – fourth ¼ 1967) was an English professional rugby league footballer who played in the 1920s and 1930s. He played at representative level for Great Britain, England, Rugby League XIII and Lancashire, and at club level for Widnes (captain), as a prop, or second-row.

== Background ==
Silcock's birth was registered in West Derby, (Liverpool), Lancashire, and his death aged 63 was registered in Widnes, Lancashire, England.

== Playing career ==
=== County honours ===
Silcock played at prop in Lancashire's 7-5 victory over Australia in the 1937–38 Kangaroo tour match at Wilderspool Stadium, Warrington on Wednesday 29 September 1937, in front of a crowd of 16,250.

=== Challenge Cup Final appearances ===
Silcock played second-row in Widnes' 10-3 victory over St. Helens in the 1929–30 Challenge Cup Final during the 1929–30 season at Wembley Stadium, London in front of a crowd of 36,544, played prop in the 5-11 defeat by Hunslet in the 1933–34 Challenge Cup Final during the 1933–34 season at Wembley Stadium, London on Saturday 5 May 1934, and played, was captain, and scored the fourth try in the 18-5 victory over Keighley in the 1936–37 Challenge Cup Final during the 1936–37 season at Wembley Stadium, London on Saturday 8 May 1937.

=== County Cup Final appearances ===
Silcock played at prop in Widnes' 4-5 defeat by Wigan in the 1928–29 Lancashire Cup Final during the 1928–29 season at Wilderspool Stadium, Warrington on Saturday 24 November 1928.

=== International honours ===
Silcock represented Rugby League XIII while at Widnes in 1934 against France, and in 1935 against France, won caps for England while at Widnes in 1932 against Wales (2 matches), in 1933 against Australia, in 1934 against Australia, and France, in 1935 against Wales, and in 1936 against Wales, and France, and won caps for Great Britain while at Widnes in 1932 against Australia (2 matches), and New Zealand (2 matches), in 1933 against Australia (3 matches), in 1936 against Australia (3 matches), and in 1937 against Australia (2 matches).

== Family ==
Silcock was the father of the rugby league footballer, Nat Silcock Jr.
