= John Wallace (rugby league) =

GB & England international rugby league footballer

Tot Wallace
- Ogden's Cigarette card featuring John Wallace

Personal information
- Full name: John Wallace
- Born: unknown
- Died: unknown

Playing information
- Position: Wing
Club
Years	Team	Pld	T	G	FG	P
	Barrow
1924–≥26	St Helens Recs
	Total	0	0	0	0	0
Representative
Years	Team	Pld	T	G	FG	P
1925–26	England	2	2	0	0	6
1926	Great Britain	1	1	0	0	3

John "Tot" Wallace (birth unknown – death unknown) was an English professional rugby league footballer who played in the 1920s. He played at representative level for Great Britain and England, and at club level for St. Helens Recs, as a wing.

== Playing career ==
=== Club career ===
In September 1924, Wallace was transferred from Barrow to St Helens Recs.

=== International honours ===
Jim Wallace won caps for England while at St. Helens Recs in 1925 against Wales, in 1926 against Other Nationalities, and won a cap for Great Britain while at St. Helens Recs in 1926 against New Zealand.
