= James Pyke (rugby union) =

English rugby union player

- Full name: James Pyke
- Born: 8 February 1866 St. Helens, Lancashire, England
- Died: 17 May 1941 (aged 75) St. Helens, Lancashire, England

Rugby union career
- Position: Forwards
Senior career
Years	Team	Apps	(Points)
–	St. Helens Recs		
International career
Years	Team	Apps	(Points)
1892	England	1	(0)

James Pyke (8 February 1866 – 17 May 1941) was an English rugby union footballer who played in the 1890s. He played at representative level for England, and at club level for St. Helens Recs, as a forward, e.g. front row, lock, or back row. Prior to Saturday 6 September 1913, St. Helens Recs was a rugby union, and association football (soccer) club.

== Background ==
Jimmy Pyke was born in St. Helens, Lancashire on 8 February 1866, and he died aged 75 in St. Helens, Lancashire on 17 May 1941.

== Playing career ==
Jimmy Pyke won a cap for England while at St. Helens Recs in the 17–0 victory over Wales at Rectory Field, Blackheath on Saturday 2 January 1892.

== Personal life ==
Pyke married Martha Eden in 1888 in the Prescot district.
