= 1929–30 Challenge Cup =

Rugby league competition

- Duration: 5 rounds
- Winners: Widnes
- Runners-up: St Helens

The 1929–30 Challenge Cup was the 30th staging of rugby league's oldest knockout competition, the Challenge Cup.

== First round ==
Date	Team one	Score one	Team two	Score two
08 Feb	Barrow	15	York	4
08 Feb	Batley	5	Hull Kingston Rovers	3
08 Feb	Castleford	11	Bramley	4
08 Feb	Cottingham	0	Leigh	48
08 Feb	Dewsbury	24	Rochdale Hornets	10
08 Feb	Featherstone Jrs	9	Halifax	74
08 Feb	Huddersfield	2	Warrington	5
08 Feb	Hull FC	44	Bickershaw	10
08 Feb	Hunslet	8	Oldham	3
08 Feb	Keighley	6	Great Clifton	5
08 Feb	Leeds	27	Featherstone Rovers	5
08 Feb	St Helens	9	St Helens Recs	7
08 Feb	Salford	0	Wigan Highfield	5
08 Feb	Swinton	5	Wakefield Trinity	5
08 Feb	Widnes	20	Bradford Northern	0
08 Feb	Wigan	19	Broughton Rangers	7
12 Feb	Wakefield Trinity	2	Swinton	7

== Second round ==
Date	Team one	Score one	Team two	Score two
22 Feb	Barrow	7	Keighley	5
22 Feb	Castleford	3	Hull FC	6
22 Feb	Hunslet	15	Batley	0
22 Feb	Leeds	5	St Helens	18
22 Feb	Swinton	7	Widnes	7
226 Feb	Warrington	12	Leigh	3
22 Feb	Wigan Highfield	0	Dewsbury	0
22 Feb	Wigan	14	Halifax	5
25 Feb	Dewsbury	7	Wigan Highfield	5
27 Feb	Widnes	6	Swinton	5

== Quarterfinals ==
Date	Team one	Score one	Team two	Score two
08 Mar	Barrow	13	Dewsbury	7
08 Mar	St Helens	22	Hunslet	7
08 Mar	Widnes	19	Hull FC	5
08 Mar	Wigan	16	Warrington	5

== Semifinals ==
Date	Team one	Score one	Team two	Score two
29 Mar	Widnes	10	Barrow	3
29 Mar	St Helens	5	Wigan	5
02 Apr	Wigan	10	St Helens	22

== Final ==
Widnes beat St Helens 10–3 in the Challenge Cup Final at Wembley played before a crowd of 36,544.

This was Widnes' first Cup final appearance and thus their first Cup final win.

3 May 1930

Widnes	10 - 3	St Helens
Tries: Ratcliffe, Dennett; Goals: Hoey (2)	Report	Tries: Houghton

Wembley, London
Attendance: 36,544

1	Bob Fraser
2	Jack Dennett
3	Albert Ratcliffe
4	Peter Topping
5	Harry Owen
6	Paddy Douglas (c)
7	Jerry Laughton
8	Nat Silcock
9	George Stevens
10	Fred Kelsall
11	Harry Millington
12	George van Rooyen
13	Jimmy Hoey

1	Charlie Crooks
2	Roy Hardgrave
3	George Lewis (c)
4	Billy Mercer
5	Alf Ellaby
6	Les Fairclough
7	Walter 'Plodder' Groves
8	Lou Hutt
9	William "Bill" Clarey
10	Louis Houghton
11	Trevor Hall
12	Ben Halfpenny
13	Robert "Bob" 'Slosher' Harrison
