= Hector Gee =

Australia international rugby league footballer

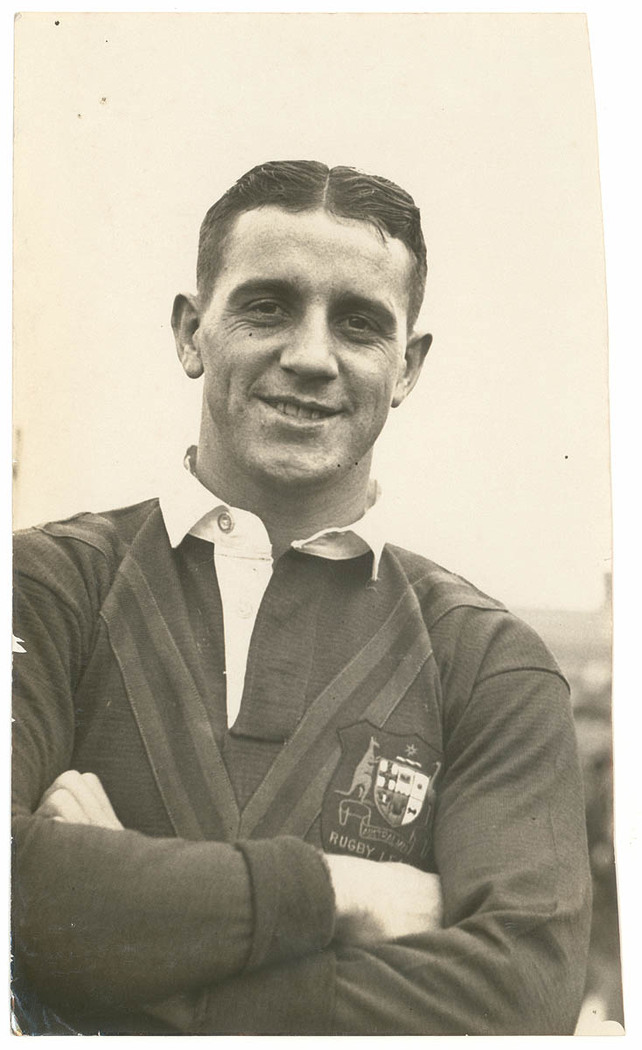
- Hector Gee in his Australia shirt

Personal information
- Born: 10 November 1909 Australia
- Died: 1987 (aged 77–78)

Playing information
- Position: Five-eighth, Halfback
Club
Years	Team	Pld	T	G	FG	P
19??–32	Tivoli
1932–44	Wigan	351	71	3	0	219
	Leeds
1944–45	→ Batley (guest)	7
1945–47	Batley	64	12
	Total	422	83	3	0	219
Representative
Years	Team	Pld	T	G	FG	P
1930–32	Queensland	10
1932	Australia	3	2	0	0	6
1936	Dominion XIII	1	0	0	0	0
1937	British Empire XIII	1	0	0	0	0
- Source: As of 25 April 2012

Hector Arthur Gee (10 November 1909 – 1987) was an Australian professional rugby league footballer who played in the 1930s and 1940s. He played at representative level for Australia, Queensland, British Empire XIII and Dominion XIII, and at club level in Australia for Tivoli, and in England for Wigan, Leeds (World War II guest), and Batley (two spells, including one as a World War II guest), as a stand-off, or scrum-half.

== Playing career ==
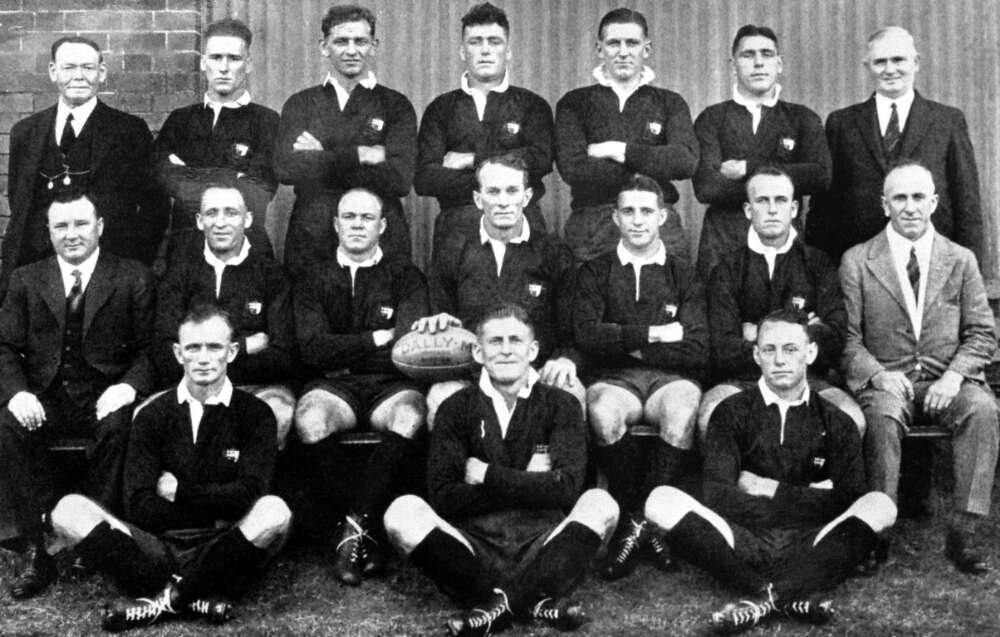
Test side 6Jun1932, Gee seated 3rd from right

=== Australia ===
Gee played in the Ipswich Rugby League competition for the Tivoli club, gaining selection for Queensland in 1930. He then played scrum-half for Australia while at Tivoli in the 6–8 defeat by Great Britain at the Sydney Cricket Ground on Monday 6 June 1932, scored two tries playing alongside Tivoli teammate, Forward Les Heidke in the 15–6 victory over Great Britain at the Gabba, Brisbane on Saturday 18 June 1932, and in the 13–18 defeat by Great Britain at Sydney Cricket Ground on Saturday 16 July 1932.

=== England ===
Having moved to England to continue his playing career, he made his début for Wigan in the 26–20 victory over St. Helens Recreation at Central Park, Wigan on Saturday 15 October 1932, he scored his first try for Wigan in the 17–11 victory over Halifax at Thrum Hall, Halifax on Saturday 22 October 1932, he scored his last try for Wigan in the 17–2 victory over Oldham at Watersheddings, Oldham on Saturday 8 January 1944, and he played his last Match for Wigan in the 27–0 victory over Keighley at Lawkholme Lane, Keighley on Saturday 2 September 1944.

Gee played scrum-half in Wigan's 30–27 victory over France at Central Park, Wigan, on Saturday 10 March 1934. He then played scrum-half, in Wigan's 15–3 victory over Salford in the Championship Final during the 1933–34 season at Wilderspool Stadium, Warrington on Saturday 28 April 1934.

Gee played scrum-half for Dominion XIII while at Wigan in the 5–8 defeat by France at Stade Buffalo, Paris on Sunday 26 April 1936, and for British Empire XIII while at Wigan in 15–0 victory over France at Stade Buffalo, Paris on Monday 1 November 1937.

Gee played scrum-half in Wigan's 12–21 defeat by Salford in the 1934–35 Lancashire Cup Final during the 1934–35 season at Station Road, Swinton on Saturday 20 October 1934, and played scrum-half in the 10–7 victory over Salford in the 1938–39 Lancashire Cup Final during the 1938–39 season at Station Road, Swinton, on Saturday 22 October 1938.

Gee played scrum-half in Wigan's 13–9 victory over Dewsbury in the Championship Final first-leg during the 1943–44 season at Central Park, Wigan on Saturday 13 May 1944 (Tommy Bradshaw played scrum-half in the second-leg).

Gee played for Batley as a World War II guest from Leeds, and was transferred permanently from Leeds to Batley on 23 April 1945, he made his début for Batley against Barrow at Mount Pleasant, Batley on Saturday 25 August 1945, and he played his last match for Batley against Liverpool Stanley at Mount Pleasant, Batley on Saturday 24 May 1947.
