= George Lewis (rugby) =

Wales international rugby league footballer

Personal information
- Full name: George Francis Lewis
- Born: 9 August 1897 Pontypool, Wales
- Died: 1988 (aged 90–91) Pontypool, Wales

Playing information

Rugby union
- Position: Centre
Club
Years	Team	Pld	T	G	FG	P
	Pontypool RFC

Rugby league
- Position: Fullback, Centre, Stand-off, Scrum-half
Club
Years	Team	Pld	T	G	FG	P
1922–36	St. Helens	428	45	850	0	1835
Representative
Years	Team	Pld	T	G	FG	P
1927	Monmouthshire	≥1
1926–28	Wales	3

George Lewis (9 August 1897 – 1988) was a Welsh rugby union and professional rugby league footballer who played in the 1920s and 1930s. He played club level rugby union (RU) for Pontypool RFC, as a centre, and representative level rugby league (RL) for Wales and Monmouthshire, and at club level for St. Helens, as a fullback, centre, stand-off or scrum-half.

== Playing career ==
=== International honours ===
George Lewis won 3 caps for Wales (RL) in 1926–1928 while at St Helens.

=== County honours ===
George Lewis played at centre, and scored a try and a goal in Monmouthshire's 14–18 defeat by Glamorgan in the non-County Championship match during the 1926–27 season at Taff Vale Park, Pontypridd on Saturday 30 April 1927.

=== Championship final appearances ===
George Lewis played fullback, and scored three goals in St. Helens' 9-5 victory over Huddersfield in the Championship Final during the 1931–32 season at Belle Vue, Wakefield on Saturday 7 May 1932.

=== Challenge Cup Final appearances ===
George Lewis played at centre, and was captain in St. Helens' 3–10 defeat by Widnes in the 1929–30 Challenge Cup Final at Wembley Stadium, London on Saturday 3 May 1930, in front of a crowd of 36,544.

=== County Cup Final appearances ===
George Lewis played at centre, and scored two goals in St. Helens' 10-2 victory over St Helens Recs in the 1926 Lancashire Cup Final during the 1926–27 season at Wilderspool Stadium, Warrington on Saturday 20 November 1926, and played at centre, and scored three goals in the 9–10 defeat by Warrington in the 1932 Lancashire Cup Final during the 1932–33 season at Central Park, Wigan on Saturday 19 November 1932.

=== Club records ===
George Lewis is second in the St Helens all time goal-scoring list behind Kel Coslett, and fourth on the points-scoring list behind Kel Coslett, Paul Loughlin and Austin Rhodes.

== Genealogical information ==
George Lewis was the brother of the rugby union footballer for Pontypool RFC, and the rugby league scrum-half for St. Helens; Stanley "Stan" Lewis.
