= Joe Wilson (rugby league) =

Australian rugby league footballer (1908–1979)

Personal information
- Full name: Colin George Wilson
- Born: 28 November 1908
- Died: 25 August 1979 (aged 70)

Playing information
- Position: Centre, Wing
Representative
Years	Team	Pld	T	G	FG	P
1931–32	Queensland	8	0	0	0	0
1932	Australia	3	1	0	0	3

Colin George Wilson (28 November 1908 – 25 August 1979) was an Australian rugby league footballer.

An Ipswich–based player, Wilson was on a wing for Australia in all three home internationals against the 1932 Great Britain Lions. In the second Test match, known as the "Battle of Brisbane", Wilson scored a first half try to help secure Australia's only victory of the series. The remainder of his career was spent in England. He started out with Wigan, where he married a local, and later competed for Bradford Northern.

Wilson was employed as a wool sorter while overseas and during the war worked in munitions. He returned to Australia after the war and settled in Sadliers Crossing.
