= Ben Halfpenny =

GB & England international rugby league footballer

Personal information
- Full name: Benjamin Halfpenny
- Born: April 23, 1906 Widnes, England
- Died: 15 June 1966 (aged 60) Widnes, England

Playing information
- Position: Wing, Centre, Prop, Second-row, Loose forward
Club
Years	Team	Pld	T	G	FG	P
1924–27	Widnes	76	14	0	0	42
1927–34	St. Helens	196	59	0	0	177
1935	Warrington	5	1	0	0	3
	Total	277	74	0	0	222
Representative
Years	Team	Pld	T	G	FG	P
1928	England	1	0	0	0	0
≤1928–≥28	Great Britain	0

Benjamin Halfpenny (23 April 1906 – June 1966) was an English professional rugby league footballer who played in the 1920s and 1930s. He played at representative level for Great Britain (non-Test matches), and England, and at club level for Widnes, St Helens and Warrington, as a wing, centre, prop, second-row, or loose forward.

== Playing career ==
=== Championship final appearances ===
Halfpenny played at second-row in St. Helens' 9–5 victory over Huddersfield in the Championship Final during the 1931–32 season at Belle Vue, Wakefield on Saturday 7 May 1932.

=== Challenge Cup Final appearances ===
Halfpenny played at second-row in St. Helens' 3–10 defeat by Widnes in the 1929–30 Challenge Cup Final at Wembley Stadium, London on Saturday 3 May 1930, in front of a crowd of 36,544.

=== County Cup Final appearances ===
Halfpenny played at prop in St. Helens' 9–10 defeat by Warrington in the 1932 Lancashire Cup Final during the 1932–33 season at Central Park, Wigan on Saturday 19 November 1932.

=== Club career ===
Halfpenny made his début for Warrington on 26 January 1935, scored his only try for Warrington in the 18–5 victory over Leigh at Mather Lane (adjacent to the Bridgewater Canal), Leigh, and he played his last match for Warrington on 16 February 1935.

=== International honours ===
Halfpenny won a cap for England while at St. Helens in 1928 against Wales.

Halfpenny was selected for Great Britain while at St. Helens for the 1928 Great Britain Lions tour of Australia and New Zealand.
