= Swffryd =

Coordinates: 51.682482°N 3.133626°W

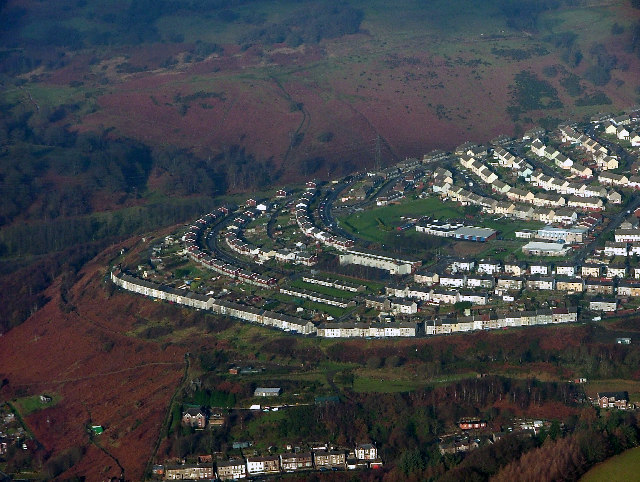
- Swffryd

- Location within Blaenau Gwent
- OS grid reference: ST2172298800
- Principal area: Blaenau Gwent
- Preserved county: Gwent
- Country: Wales
- Sovereign state: United Kingdom
- Post town: CRUMLIN, NEWPORT
- Postcode district: NP11
- Dialling code: 01495
- Police: Gwent
- Fire: South Wales
- Ambulance: Welsh
- UK Parliament: Blaenau Gwent and Rhymney
- Senedd Cymru – Welsh Parliament: Blaenau Gwent

Swffryd (or Sofrydd) is a Welsh community on the boundary of Blaenau Gwent County Borough Council.

== Geography ==
The Ebbw River flows past the west of the village.

It is located 0.4 miles (0.64 km) north east of Crumlin, 3.3 miles (5.3 km) south of Abertillery and 8.7 miles (14.0 km) north west of Newport. The B4471 and A472 runs near to the village. Swffryd is the most Southerly Human settlement in Blaenau Gwent. The population of the community is 5,947 including the whole ward of Crumlin.

Most of the site was built as local authority houses to house the mining population. Lewis Street, Rectory Road and other parts in the west of the village have older houses and buildings.

Remains of the Crumlin Viaduct can still be seen in Swffryd / Sofrydd and can be seen in full view from neighbouring Crumlin just off Lewis Street at the top of the embankment.

Part of Swffryd

== Politics ==
The Llanhilleth electoral ward serves the village. The ward is represented by Councillors Norman Lee Parsons (Llanhilleth, Ind), Hedley McCarthy (Llanhilleth, Lab), and Joanne Collins (Llanhilleth, Ind).

The area is represented in the Senedd by Alun Davies (Labour) and the Member of Parliament is Nick Smith (Labour).

== Transport ==
The village is a 37-minute walk, and 1.7 miles (2.7 km) from Llanhilleth railway station. It is also a 48-minute 2.2 miles (3.5 km) walk to Newbridge railway station. Both stations provide hourly trains from Ebbw Vale to Cardiff Central, and in 2021, to Newport.

The town is served by the bus stops on the B4471 at Sofrydd Schools and Walters Avenue stops, with connections to Stagecoach South Wales services:

- 21 (Cwmbran-Blackwood/Pontypool)
- 62 (Ebbw Vale-Cwmbran)
- X15 (Newport-Brynmawr)
- X1 (Cwmbran-Brynmawr and Pontypool)
- 95A (Abertillery)
- 95B (Newbridge)
- 95C (Aberbeeg)
