= Albert Fildes =

Great Britain and England international rugby league footballer

Personal information
- Full name: Albert Edward Fildes
- Born: 9 February 1901 Runcorn, Cheshire, England
- Died: September 1976 (aged 75) St Helens, Merseyside, England

Playing information
- Position: Prop, Second-row, Loose forward
Club
Years	Team	Pld	T	G	FG	P
≤1923–30	St Helens Recs
1930–34	St Helens	129	19			57
	Total	129	19	0	0	57
Representative
Years	Team	Pld	T	G	FG	P
	Lancashire	≥1
1927–29	England	2	0	0	0	0
1926–32	Great Britain	15	2	0	0	6

Albert Edward Fildes (9 February 1901 – September 1976) was an English professional rugby league footballer who played in the 1920s and 1930s. He played at representative level for Great Britain, England and Lancashire, and at club level for St Helens Recs and St Helens as a prop, second-row or loose forward.

== Background ==
Albert Fildes was born in Runcorn, Cheshire, England, and he died aged 75 in St Helens, Merseyside.

== Playing career ==
=== Club career ===
Fildes played at second-row in St. Helens Recs' 17-0 victory over Swinton in the 1923 Lancashire Cup Final during the 1923–24 season at Central Park, Wigan on Saturday 24 November 1923, and he played at second-row, and scored a try in St. Helens' 9-10 defeat by Warrington in the 1932 Lancashire Cup Final during the 1932–33 season at Central Park, Wigan on Saturday 19 November 1932.

Fildes played in St. Helens' victory in the Lancashire League during the 1931–32 season.

Due to being on the 1932 Great Britain Lions tour of Australia and New Zealand, Fildes and Alf Ellaby did not play in St. Helens' 9-5 victory over Huddersfield in the Championship Final during the 1931–32 season at Belle Vue, Wakefield on Saturday 7 May 1932.

=== International honours ===
Fildes won caps for England while at St. Helens Recs in 1927 against Wales, in 1929 against Other Nationalities, and won caps for Great Britain while at St. Helens Recs in 1926-27 against New Zealand (2 matches), in 1928 against Australia (3 matches), and New Zealand (3 matches), in 1929-30 against Australia (3 matches), while at St. Helens in 1932 against Australia, and New Zealand (3 matches).

== Personal life ==
After retiring from playing, he was the landlord of The White Hart Hotel, Church St, St Helens.
