= Les White (rugby league, born 1905) =

GB, England & Wales international rugby league footballer

Personal information
- Full name: Leslie Llewellyn White
- Born: 21 April 1905 Briton Ferry, Wales
- Died: 13 December 1973 (aged 68) Leeds, England

Playing information
- Position: Hooker
Club
Years	Team	Pld	T	G	FG	P
1926–28	Pontypridd
1928–46	Hunslet	498	43	1	0	131
	Total	498	43	1	0	131
Representative
Years	Team	Pld	T	G	FG	P
1928–33	Wales	7	0	0	0	0
1929–33	Other Nationalities	4	1	0	0	3
1932–33	Great Britain	8	0	0	0	0

Leslie Llewellyn White (1905 – 1973) was a Welsh professional rugby league footballer who played in the 1920s, 1930s and 1940s. He played at representative level for Great Britain, Wales, England, and at club level for Pontypridd and Hunslet, as a hooker. Les White was also a lance corporal in the British Army during World War II.

== Playing career ==
=== Club career ===
White joined Hunslet from Pontypridd in January 1928.

White played hooker in Hunslet's 8–2 victory over Leeds in the Championship Final during the 1937–38 season at Elland Road, Leeds on Saturday 30 April 1938.

=== International honours ===
White won seven caps for Wales from 1928 to 1933 while at Pontypridd and Hunslet, won a cap for England while at Hunslet in 1933 against Australia, and won caps for Great Britain while at Hunslet in 1932 Australia (3 matches), and New Zealand (2 matches), and in 1933 Australia (2 matches).

=== Other notable matches ===
White played hooker for Northern Command XIII against a Rugby League XIII at Thrum Hall, Halifax on Saturday 21 March 1942. Coincidentally, he played alongside another Les White.

== Outside of rugby league ==
White was the landlord of the St. Helens Inn public house, Whitehouse Street, Hunslet, Leeds during the 1930s, and the Moorhouse Inn public house, Moor Crescent, Hunslet, Leeds during the 1940s. He died in December 1973, aged 68.
