= Joe Thompson (rugby) =

GB & Wales dual-code rugby international footballer

Personal information
- Full name: Joseph Francis Thompson
- Born: 22 December 1902; Hambrook, Gloucestershire, England
- Died: 13 October 1983 (aged 80); Leeds, England

Playing information

Rugby union
- Position: Number Eight
Club
Years	Team	Pld	T	G	FG	P
19??–23	Cross Keys RFC
Representative
Years	Team	Pld	T	G	FG	P
1923	Wales	1	0	0	0	0

Rugby league
- Position: Prop, Second-row, Loose forward
Club
Years	Team	Pld	T	G	FG	P
1923–33	Leeds	390	53	862	0	1883
Representative
Years	Team	Pld	T	G	FG	P
1923–32	Wales	8	2	1	0	8
19??–??	Other Nationalities	5	1	0	0	3
1924–32	Great Britain	12	1	3	0	9

Joseph Francis Thompson (22 December 1902 – 13 October 1983) was an English-born dual-code international rugby union, and professional rugby league footballer who played in the 1910s, 1920s and 1930s. He played representative level rugby union (RU) for Wales, and at club level for Cross Keys RFC, as a number eight, and representative level rugby league (RL) for Great Britain, Wales and Other Nationalities, and at club level for Leeds, as a prop, second-row, or loose forward, he died in Leeds.

== Back ==
Joe Thompson was born in Hambrook, Gloucestershire, born of English parents he was raised from infancy in Crosskeys, Monmouthshire, and he died aged 80 in Leeds, West Yorkshire, England.

== Playing career ==
In 1923, aged 20, Joe Thompson became a Dual-code rugby international, first playing in the Wales (RU) team at Twickenham Stadium, and later that year for Wales (RL) in the rugby league international at the Fartown Ground, Huddersfield.

== International honours ==
Joe Thompson won a cap for Wales (RU) while at Cross Keys RFC in 1923 against England, won caps for Wales (RL) while at Leeds 8-caps, won caps for Other Nationalities (RL) while at Leeds 5-caps, and won caps for Great Britain while at Leeds in 1924 against Australia, and New Zealand (2 matches), in 1928 against Australia, and New Zealand, in 1929 against Australia, and in 1932 against Australia (3 matches), and New Zealand (3 matches).

== Rugby career ==
Joe Thompson played soccer until his late teens but a short time after trying rugby union he was playing in the Cross Keys RFC first team. While with Cross Keys, Joe Thompson was selected to play for the Welsh national rugby union team in the opening match of the 1923 Five Nations Championship. Wales lost the game 7–3 and this match was the only cap Joe Thompson won under rugby union rules.

== Rugby league career ==
In February 1923 he signed for Leeds playing in the second-row. He had worked as a coal miner since the age of 13, a background that had no doubt hardened him. He was a fearless tackler and a powerful runner with terrific ball handling skills, unusual for a forward of that period. More surprising still was his masterly command of goal-kicking, with 862 goals in eleven seasons playing for Leeds. Joe Thompson played at second-row and scored 5-goals in the 28–3 victory over Hull F.C. in the 1922–23 Challenge Cup Final during the 1922–23 season at Belle Vue, Wakefield, the only occasion the Challenge Cup final has ever been staged at Belle Vue. He was the 1927–28 season's top point scorer with 233. He was the 1929–30 season's top point scorer with 243. In all first class games he landed 921 goals and scored over 2,000 points. With 1,883-points, Joe Thompson is third in the Leeds' all-time points scoring list, behind Kevin Sinfield (3967-points), and Lewis Jones (3,372-points).

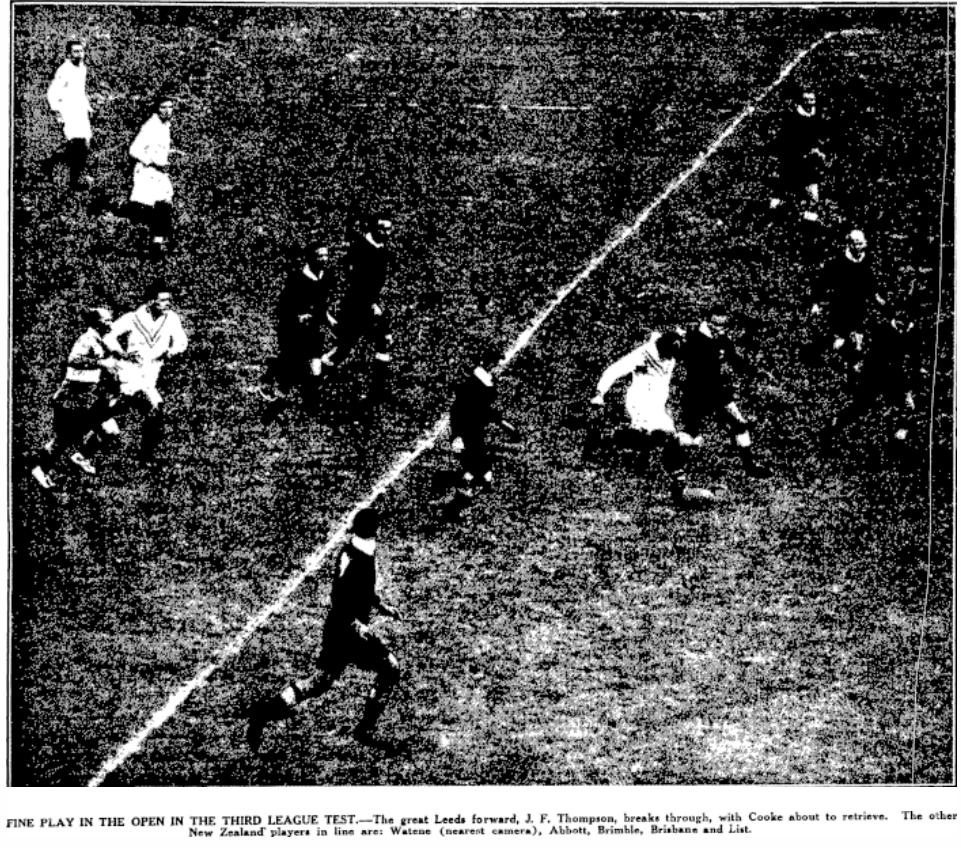
Thompson kicking the ball ahead with Bert Cooke contesting in the 3rd test against New Zealand in 1932 at Carlaw Park.

In Test matches Joe Thompson was on the winning side on eight occasions in 12 appearances, with the distinction of selection for Australian tours in 1924, 1928 and 1932. In the history of tours to Australasia the only forward to equal this was Brian Edgar of Workington Town. On each of Thompson's three tours Britain came home with The Ashes. The 1932 tour was his apotheosis, playing in a star-studded pack in all six Tests in Australia and New Zealand. This included the infamous second Australian Test, enshrined in Rugby League history as the "Battle of Brisbane" with nine players suffering serious injury. In New Zealand all three Tests were won and on the whole tour only two of 26 games were lost.

Joe Thompson was capped 25 times; 12 internationals for Great Britain (RL), eight for Wales (RL) and five for Other Nationalities (RL).

On his retirement in April 1933 Leeds paid him the rare honour of making him a life member of the club.

== Career records ==
Joe Thompson is one of less than ten Welshmen to have scored more than 2,000 points in their rugby league career.

== Contemporaneous Article Extract ==
"Never was there a man less likely to have his head turned by fame or flattery. His approach to life was like his approach to football – simple, direct, thoughtful and sincere. There was something reassuringly solid about that massive figure, that firmly moulded beak of a nose and that determined, jutting jaw. Joe Thompson was dependability itself. From the day at Twickenham Stadium when their scouts saw a young forward from Cwmcarn walk to the touchline, spit out a few broken teeth, and then go back into the game as though it was nothing at all out of the ordinary, Leeds knew that they were on a good thing."
