= 1926–27 Lancashire Cup =

- Structure: Regional knockout competition
- Teams: 14
- Champions: St. Helens
- Runners-up: St Helens Recs

The 1926–27 Lancashire Cup was the nineteenth competition in the history of this regional rugby league contest and another new name was added to the trophy. It was the turn of St. Helens, one of the founding members of the Northern Union, to lift the trophy and until this year had never even reached the final of the competition. In a local derby match St. Helens beat very near neighbours St Helens Recs by 10–2. The match was played at Wilderspool, Warrington. The attendance was 19,439 and receipts £1192.

For the first time in the competition, both semi-finals resulted in draws and required replays.

== Background ==
The number of teams entering this year's competition increased by one to 14 which resulted in 2 byes in the first round. The additional team were amateur side Pemberton Rovers.

== Competition and results ==
=== Round 1 ===
Involved 6 matches (with two byes) and 14 clubs

Game No	Fixture date	Home team	Score	Away team	Venue	Att	Rec	Notes	Ref
1	Wed 6 October 1926	Wigan Highfield	10–11	Rochdale Hornets	Tunstall Lane				
2	Thu 7 October 1926	St. Helens	51–8	Pemberton Rovers	Knowsley Road			1	
3	Sat 9 October 1926	Barrow	24–2	Broughton Rangers	Little Park, Roose				
4	Sat 9 October 1926	Oldham	2–3	Salford	Watersheddings				
5	Sat 9 October 1926	St Helens Recs	21–3	Leigh	City Road				
6	Sat 9 October 1926	Wigan	6–10	Swinton	Central Park				
7		Warrington		bye					
8		Widnes		bye					

=== Round 2 – quarterfinals ===
Game No	Fixture date	Home team	Score	Away team	Venue	Att	Rec	Notes	Ref
1	Mon 18 October 1926	Warrington	9–16	Widnes	Wilderspool				
2	Wed 20 October 1926	St Helens Recs	26–2	Rochdale Hornets	City Road				
3	Wed 20 October 1926	Salford	6–5	Barrow	The Willows				
4	Thu 21 October 1926	St. Helens	29–18	Swinton	Knowsley Road				

=== Round 3 – semifinals ===
Game No	Fixture date	Home team	Score	Away team	Venue	Att	Rec	Notes	Ref
1	Thu 4 November 1926	Widnes	3–3	St. Helens	Lowerhouse Lane				
2	Wed 10 November 1926	St Helens Recs	8–8	Salford	City Road				
Replays
3	Mon 8 November 1926	St. Helens	17–0	Widnes	Knowsley Road				
4	Fri 12 November 1926	Salford	0–14	St Helens Recs	The Willows				

=== Final ===
Game No	Fixture date	Home team	Score	Away team	Venue	Att	Rec	Notes	Ref
	Saturday 20 November 1926	St. Helens	10–2	St Helens Recs	Wilderspool	19439	£1,192	2	

==== Teams and scorers ====
St. Helens	No.	St Helens Recs
	teams	
Charlie Crooks	1	team unknown
George Cotton	2	
Alf Frodsham	3	
George Lewis	4	
Alf Ellaby	5	
Les Fairclough	6	
Walter Groves	7	
Bob Atkin	8	
Albert Simm	9	
Louis Houghton	10	
Bill Clarey	11	
Fred Roffey	12	
Ernie Shaw	13	
10	score	2
10	HT	2
	Scorers	
	Tries	
Alf Ellaby (1)	T	
Les Fairclough (1)	T	
	Goals	
George Lewis (2)	G	
	Drop Goals	
	DG	
Referee		

Scoring – Try = three (3) points – Goal = two (2) points – Drop goal = two (2) points

=== The road to success ===
First round
Warrington
bye
Widnes
bye
St. Helens	51
Pemberton Rovers	8
Wigan	6
Swinton	10
St Helens Recs	21
Leigh	3
Wigan Highfield	10
Rochdale Hornets	11
Oldham	2
Salford	3
Barrow	24
Broughton Rangers	2

Second round
Warrington	9
Widnes	16
St. Helens	29
Swinton	18
St Helens Recs	26
Rochdale Hornets	2
Salford	6
Barrow	5

Semifinals
Widnes	3(0)
St. Helens	3(17)
St Helens Recs	8(14)
Salford	8(0)

Final
St. Helens	10
St Helens Recs	2

== See also ==
- 1926–27 Northern Rugby Football League season

== Notes ==
- 1 Pemberton Rovers were a Junior (amateur) club from Wigan.
- 2 Wilderspool was the home ground of Warrington from 1883 to the end of the 2003 Summer season.
