= Alf Ellaby =

Great Britain and England international rugby league player (1902-1993)

Personal information
- Full name: Alfred Henry Ellaby
- Born: 24 November 1902 Prescot, England
- Died: 1993 (aged 90–91) Garforth, West Yorkshire, England

Playing information
- Position: Wing
Club
Years	Team	Pld	T	G	FG	P
1926–34	St. Helens	261	271	0		813
1934–37	Wigan	103	90	0		270
1937–39	St. Helens	28	9	0		27
	Total	392	370	0	0	1110
Representative
Years	Team	Pld	T	G	FG	P
1927–35	England	8	13	0		39
1928–33	Great Britain	13	7	0		21

Alfred "Alf" Henry Ellaby (24 November 1902 – 1993) was an English rugby league footballer who played in the 1920s and 1930s. He played at representative level for Great Britain, England and Lancashire, and at club level for St. Helens (two spells), and Wigan, as a wing. Ellaby retired as the England and St. Helens' all-time top try-scorer. Ellaby was dubbed the "Hat-trick King", with 31 for his home-town club, St. Helens. Ellaby was Liverpool's first rugby league superstar.

== Background ==
Ellaby was born in Prescot, Lancashire, he saw a promising association football career with Rotherham United ended by a knee injury before going on to become a St. Helens legend, and he died aged 90–91.

== Playing career ==
Ellaby played on the wing and scored a try in St. Helens' 10–2 victory over St Helens Recs in the 1926 Lancashire Cup Final during the 1926–27 season at Wilderspool Stadium, Warrington on Saturday 20 November 1926. He scored 50 tries during the 1926–27 season. Ellaby won caps for England while at St. Helens in 1927 against Wales, in 1928 against Wales (2 matches), in 1930 Other Nationalities, in 1931 against Wales, in 1932 against Wales (2 matches), and in 1934 against France. He also won caps for Great Britain in 1928 against Australia (3 matches), and New Zealand (2 matches).

Alf Ellaby played on the wing in St. Helens' 3–10 defeat by Widnes in the 1929–30 Challenge Cup Final at Wembley Stadium, London on Saturday 3 May 1930, in front of a crowd of 36,544.

During the 1929–30 Kangaroo tour of Great Britain Ellaby played for Great Britain in the first and second Test matches against Australia. During the 1931–32 season Ellaby set the St Helens club's record for most tries in a match with six on 5 March 1932, a record that has since been matched, but never broken. He played in St. Helens' victory that season in the Lancashire League. Due to being on the 1932 Great Britain Lions tour of Australia and New Zealand, Ellaby and Albert Fildes did not play in St. Helens' 9–5 victory over Huddersfield in the Championship Final during the 1931–32 season at Belle Vue, Wakefield on Saturday 7 May 1932. He played for Great Britain in 1932 against Australia (3 matches), and New Zealand (2 matches), in 1933 Australia. Ellaby played on the wing in the 9–10 defeat by Warrington in the 1932 Lancashire Cup Final during the 1932–33 season at Central Park, Wigan on Saturday 19 November 1932. He had amassed 280 tries in 289 matches for St. Helens.

Ellaby was transferred to Wigan in 1933 to help ease St. Helens' financial burden, in his début for Wigan he scored a hat-trick of tries. During the 1933–34 Kangaroo tour of Great Britain Ellaby was selected to play on the wing for Great Britain in the first test against Australia. while at Wigan he played for England in 1935 against France, he later returned to St. Helens to complete his fantastic career.

== Post-playing ==
Ellaby's position as all-time top try-scorer in the game's history with 446, was overtaken by Brian Bevan in 1954.

Alf was, at various times, the landlord of the Veevers Arms (subsequently known as The Hop), 2–4 King Street, Blackpool, and the Ardwick Hotel, 32 Foxhall Road in Blackpool, together with the George Hotel, Selby Road, Garforth, becoming a Director of Castleford for a spell. A member of the Saints' Past Players' Hall of Fame, he lived in Garforth until his death at the age of 90 in 1993. There was to be a last twist, however, quite befitting to one of the great sporting heroes of St.Helens. His ashes were taken home on the Saints 'A' Team coach after a match at Castleford, and were later scattered on the pitch at his beloved Knowsley Road.

Ellaby was inducted into the Saints Greatest 17 in the Autumn of 2010 and was joined by Les Fairclough, his stand-off who had done so much to keep the three-quarter line moving to provide Alf with so many of his scoring opportunities.
