= Les Fairclough =

Great Britain and England international rugby league footballer

- Ogden's Cigarette card featuring Fairclough

Personal information
- Full name: Leslie Stuart Fairclough
- Born: 30 September 1902 Prescot, England
- Died: 7 October 1951 (aged 49) St. Helens, England

Playing information
- Height: 5 ft 5 in (1.65 m)
- Weight: 11 st 0 lb (70 kg)
- Position: Centre, Stand-off, Scrum-half
Club
Years	Team	Pld	T	G	FG	P
1918–32	St. Helens	355	84	3	0	258
Representative
Years	Team	Pld	T	G	FG	P
≥1918–≤32	Lancashire	20
1925–31	England	10	3	0	0	9
1926–30	Great Britain	6	6	0	0	18

Leslie Stuart Fairclough (30 September 1902 – 7 October 1951) was an English professional rugby league footballer who played in the 1920s and 1930s. He played at representative level for Great Britain, England and Lancashire, and at club level for St. Helens, as a centre, stand-off, or scrum-half.

== Background ==
Les Fairclough was born in Prescot, Lancashire, England, and he died aged 49 in St. Helens, Lancashire, England.

== Playing career ==
=== International honours ===
Les Fairclough won caps for England while at St. Helens in 1925 against Wales (2 matches), in 1926 against Wales, and Other Nationalities, in 1927 against Wales, in 1928 against Wales (2 matches), in 1930 against Other Nationalities, in 1930 against Other Nationalities, in 1931 against Wales, and won caps for Great Britain while at St. Helens in 1926–27 against New Zealand, in 1928 against Australia (2 matches), and New Zealand (2 matches), and in 1929–30 against Australia.

=== Challenge Cup Final appearances ===
Les Fairclough stand-off in St. Helens' 3–10 defeat by Widnes in the 1929–30 Challenge Cup Final at Wembley Stadium, London on Saturday 3 May 1930, in front of a crowd of 36,544.

=== County Cup Final appearances ===
Les Fairclough played stand-off and scored a try in St. Helens' 10–2 victory over St Helens Recs in the 1926 Lancashire Cup Final during the 1926–27 season at Wilderspool Stadium, Warrington on Saturday 20 November 1926.

== Honoured at St Helens R.F.C. ==
Les Fairclough is a St Helens R.F.C. Hall of Fame inductee.
