= Stanley Smith (rugby league, born c. 1910) =

English RL coach and former GB & England international rugby league footballer

Stan Smith
- Godfrey Phillips cigarette card featuring Smith

Personal information
- Full name: Stanley Smith
- Born: 22 February 1910
- Died: 3 June 1978 (aged 68)

Playing information
- Position: Wing
Club
Years	Team	Pld	T	G	FG	P
1927–30	Wakefield Trinity	81	32	0	0	96
1930–39	Leeds	261	187
	Total	342	219	0	0	96
Representative
Years	Team	Pld	T	G	FG	P
1934–35	Yorkshire
1934–35	Rugby League XIII	2	0	0	0	0
1931–35	England	6	5	0	0	15
1929–33	Great Britain	11	9	0	0	27

Coaching information
Club
Years	Team	Gms	W	D	L	W%
1947–48	Featherstone Rovers	40	6	34	0	15
- Military career
- Allegiance: United Kingdom
- Branch: British Army
- Service years: 1940-45
- Unit: REME
- Conflicts: World War II; North Africa; Italy

Stanley "Stan" Smith (22 February 1910 – 3 June 1978) was an English professional rugby league footballer who played in the 1920s and 1930s, and coached in the 1940s. He played at representative level for Great Britain, England, Rugby League XIII and Yorkshire, and at club level for Wakefield Trinity and Leeds as a wing, and coached at club level for Featherstone Rovers.

== Background ==
Stanley Smith worked as a foreman at a stone quarry in Tadcaster.

== Playing career ==
=== Club career ===
Smith started his career at Wakefield Trinity before he was transferred to Leeds during January 1930 for a record fee of £1,075, (based on increases in average earnings, this would be approximately £307,200 in 2014). Smith played on the wing in Leeds' 2–8 defeat by Hunslet in the Championship Final during the 1937–38 season at Elland Road, Leeds on Saturday 30 April 1938.

Smith retired from first class rugby in January 1940 having played for Leeds for 10 years. He had a long-standing plan to retire from rugby so that he and his wife Hilda could focus on running their pub the Butchers Arms on Williams Street in Wakefield but the outbreak of WWII saw him joining the Army at the age of 30. Stan served in the REME seeing service throughout the North African and Italian campaigns and returning home in late 1945.

=== International honours ===
Stan Smith won caps for England while at Leeds in 1931 against Wales, in 1932 against Wales (2 matches), in 1934 against Australia, and France, in 1935 against France, and won caps for Great Britain while at Wakefield Trinity in 1929 against Australia, while at Leeds in 1930 against Australia (2 matches), in 1932 against Australia (3 matches), and New Zealand (3 matches), and in 1933 against Australia (2 matches).

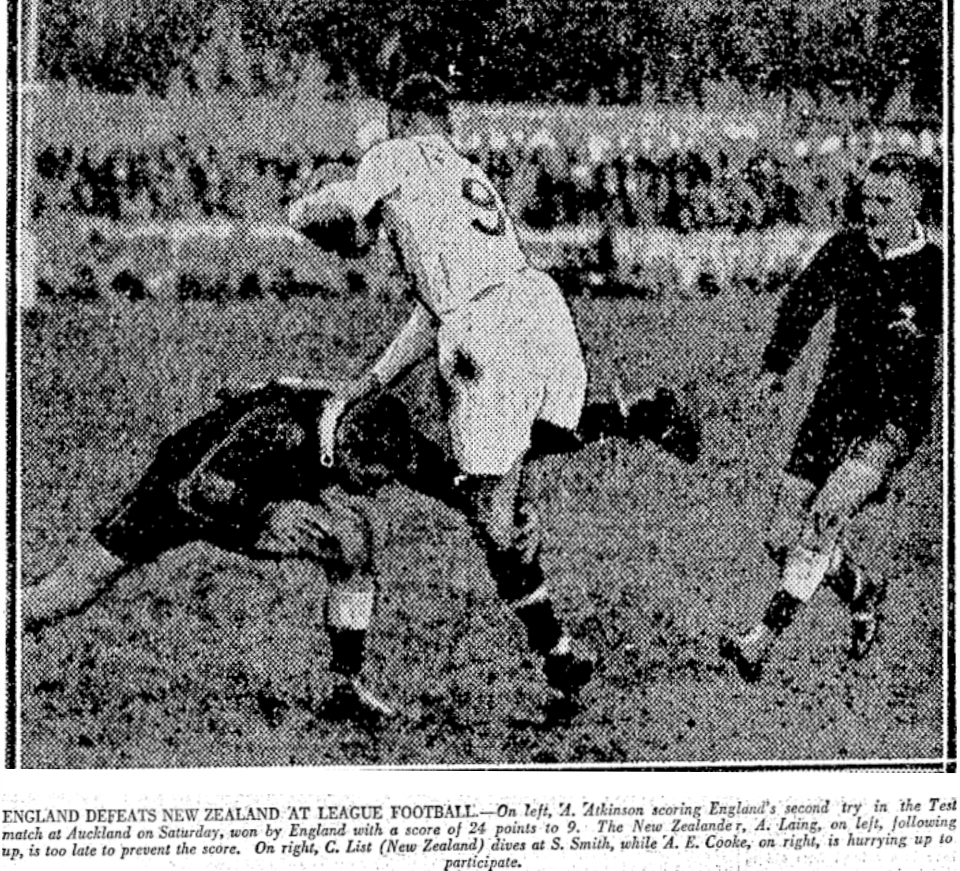
Smith being tackled by Claude List of New Zealand with Bert Cooke approaching in the 1st test of 1932 at Carlaw Park in New Zealand.

Stan Smith played twice for a Rugby League XIII against France. Playing at left-wing on both occasions, the first was at Wilderspool Stadium, Warrington on 17 March 1934 when the English team won 32–16, this game was also the first international match played by the France national rugby league team. The second was at Headingley, Leeds just over a year later, on 6 May 1935 when the English side won 25–18.

=== County honours ===
Stan Smith won cap(s) for Yorkshire while at Wakefield Trinity.

=== County Cup Final appearances ===
Stanley Smith played on the wing in Leeds' 14–8 victory over Huddersfield in the 1937–38 Yorkshire Cup Final during the 1937–38 season at Belle Vue, Wakefield on Saturday 30 October 1937. The record for the most tries in a Yorkshire Cup Final is 4-tries, and is jointly held by; Stan Moorhouse, Alan Smith, and Stanley Smith.
