= Frank Bowen (rugby league) =

GB international rugby league footballer

Personal information
- Full name: Francis Bowen
- Born: 19 September 1896 Prescot, England
- Died: c. 1964 (aged 66–67)

Playing information
- Position: Prop, Second-row
Club
Years	Team	Pld	T	G	FG	P
≤1922–33	St. Helens Recs
1933–33	St. Helens	5	0	0	0	0
	Total	5	0	0	0	0
Representative
Years	Team	Pld	T	G	FG	P
≤1922–≥22	Lancashire	≥1
1928	Great Britain	3	1	0	0	3

Francis "Frank" Bowen (19 Sep 1896 – c. 1964) was an English professional rugby league footballer who played in the 1920s and 1930s. He played at representative level for Great Britain and Lancashire, and at club level for St. Helens Recs and St. Helens, as a prop, or second-row.

== Background ==
Frank Bowen's birth was registered in Prescot district, Lancashire, England, he was the Landlord of the Vine Tavern in Thatto Heath, coaching its successful amateur rugby league team after World War II, and he died aged c. 66–67.

== Playing career ==
=== International honours ===
Frank Bowen won caps for Great Britain while at St. Helens Recs in 1928 against New Zealand (3 matches).

=== County honours ===
Frank Bowen represented Lancashire while at St. Helens Recs in 1922 against Australia at Goodison Park, Liverpool.

=== County Cup Final appearances ===
Frank Bowen did not play in St. Helens Recs' 17–0 victory over Swinton in the 1923–24 Lancashire Cup Final during the 1923–24 season at Central Park, Wigan on Saturday 24 November 1923, in front of a crowd of 25,656, he did not play in the 0–10 defeat by Oldham in the 1924–25 Lancashire Cup Final during the 1924–25 season at The Willows, Salford on Saturday 22 November 1924, in front of a crowd of 15,000, but he played right-prop in the 18–3 victory over Wigan in the 1930–31 Lancashire Cup Final during the 1930–31 season at Station Road, Swinton on Saturday 29 November 1930, in front of a crowd on 16,710.

=== Testimonial match ===
Frank Bowen's Testimonial match for St. Helens Recs took place against a Jim Sullivan Select XIII in 1931.

== Genealogical information ==
Frank Bowen was the older brother of the rugby league second-row, and loose forward of the 1920s and 1930s for St. Helens, and St. Helens Recs; Thomas "Tom" Bowen, his other brothers also played for St. Helens Recs.
