= Harold Young (rugby league) =

GB & England international rugby league footballer

Personal information
- Full name: Harold D. Young
- Born: c. 1900; Cumberland, England
- Died: 1996 (aged 96)

Playing information
- Position: Loose forward
Club
Years	Team	Pld	T	G	FG	P
1926–28	Bradford Northern
1928–33	Huddersfield
1933	Castleford	7	1	0	0	3
1933–≥33	Bradford Northern
	Total	7	1	0	0	3
Representative
Years	Team	Pld	T	G	FG	P
1927–32	Cumberland	16	2	0	0	6
1928–31	England	4	1	0	0	3
1930	Great Britain	1	0	0	0	0

Harold D. Young (c. 1900 – 1996) was an English professional rugby league footballer who played in the 1920s and 1930s. He played at representative level for Great Britain and England, and at club level for Bradford Northern (two spells), Huddersfield and Castleford, as a loose forward.

== Playing career ==
=== Club career ===
Born in Cumberland, Young joined Bradford Northern from amateur club Hensingham, and made his debut in September 1926. He was signed by Huddersfield in December 1928. He transferred from Huddersfield to Castleford during September 1933, but was put on the transfer list in November later that year. He returned to former club Bradford in December 1933.

=== International honours ===
Young won caps for England while at Bradford Northern in 1928 against Wales, while at Huddersfield in 1929 against Other Nationalities, in 1930 against Other Nationalities, in 1931 against Wales, and while at Huddersfield he won a cap playing Loose forward for Great Britain in the 3-0 victory over Australia in the 1929–30 Kangaroo tour of Great Britain at Athletic Grounds, Rochdale on 15 January 1930.

== Personal life ==
Harold Young's younger brother, Victor, was also a rugby league footballer, and played for Hunslet and Hull Kingston Rovers.

Young died in 1996, aged 96. At the time of his death, he was the oldest surviving player who had played for Great Britain.
