= Alf Frodsham =

Former Great Britain and England international rugby league footballer and coach

Personal information
- Full name: Alfred Frodsham
- Born: 29 August 1902 St Helens, England
- Died: March 1974 (aged 71) Swindon, Wiltshire, England

Playing information
- Position: Wing
Club
Years	Team	Pld	T	G	FG	P
1922–29	St. Helens	215	88	4	0	272
1929–36	St Helens Recreation RLFC
1937	St. Helens
	Total	215	88	4	0	272
Representative
Years	Team	Pld	T	G	FG	P
1927–28	England	2	1	0	0	3
1928–30	Great Britain	3	0	0	0	0
19??	Lancashire		0	0	0	0

Coaching information
Club
Years	Team	Gms	W	D	L	W%
1945–49	St. Helens
- Relatives: Eric Frodsham (brother)

Alfred Frodsham (29 August 1902 – March 1974) was an English professional rugby league footballer who played in the 1920s and 1930s, and coached in the 1940s. He played at representative level for Great Britain and England, and at club level for St Helens, as a wing, and coached at club level for St. Helens.

== Background ==
Alf Frodsham's birth was registered in Prescot district, Lancashire, England.

=== Club career ===
Alf Frodsham played at centre and scored a try in St. Helens' 10–2 victory over St Helens Recs in the 1926 Lancashire Cup Final during the 1926–27 season at Wilderspool Stadium, Warrington on Saturday 20 November 1926.

He transferred to St Helens Recs in 1929, where he won the 1930–31 Lancashire Cup final against Wigan.

=== International honours ===
Alf Frodsham won caps for England while at St. Helens in 1927 against Wales, and in 1928 against Wales, and won caps for Great Britain while at St. Helens in 1928 against New Zealand (2 matches), and in 1929 against Australia.

== Personal life ==
Alf Frodsham was the older brother of the rugby league footballer for St. Helens; W. Harry Frodsham, and the rugby league footballer Eric Frodsham.
