= Albert Bailey (rugby league) =

England international rugby league footballer

Personal information
- Full name: F. Albert Bailey
- Born: c. 1907
- Died: April 1978 (aged 71)

Playing information
- Height: 5 ft 10 in (1.78 m)
- Weight: 12 st 8 lb (80 kg)
- Position: Wing, Centre, Second-row
Club
Years	Team	Pld	T	G	FG	P
≤1934–≥39	St. Helens Recs
Representative
Years	Team	Pld	T	G	FG	P
1929–35	Lancashire	3	1	0	0	3
1934	Great Britain	1	1	0	0	3

F. Albert Bailey was an English professional rugby league footballer who played in the 1930s. He played at representative level for England and Lancashire, and at club level for St. Helens Recs (captain), as a wing, centre or second-row.

== International honours ==
Albert Bailey won a cap for Great Britain while at St. Helens Recs in 1934 against France.

== Outside of rugby league ==
Albert Bailey worked at Pilkington Brothers Limited.
