= Oliver Dolan =

GB & England international rugby league footballer

Personal information
- Full name: Oliver Dolan
- Born: c. 1894
- Died: 19 March 1985 (aged 91)

Playing information
- Position: Hooker
Club
Years	Team	Pld	T	G	FG	P
1920–37	St. Helens Recs
Representative
Years	Team	Pld	T	G	FG	P
1932	England	1	0	0	0	0
≤1928–≥28	Great Britain	0

Oliver Dolan (c. 1894 – 19 March 1985) was an English professional rugby league footballer who played in the 1920s and 1930s. He played at representative level for Great Britain (non-Test matches), and England, and at club level for St Helens Recs, as a hooker.

== Club career ==
Dolan spent his entire career at St Helens Recs, joining the club in 1920 until his retirement in 1937.

== International honours ==
Dolan won a cap for England while at St. Helens Recs in 1932 against Wales.

Dolan was selected for Great Britain while at St. Helens Recs for the 1928 Great Britain Lions tour of Australia and New Zealand.
