= St Helens Recreation RLFC =

Defunct English rugby league club, based in St Helens, Merseyside, England

St Helens Recreation Rugby League Football Club, often known as St Helens Recs or just the Recs, is a former professional rugby league club from St. Helens, Lancashire, that played in the Rugby Football League during the inter-war years. The club had a great rivalry with St Helens RFC.

== History ==
The club was founded in 1878 as part of the sports and recreational provision of Pilkington Glass. Initially the side played rugby union but in 1898, a year after starting an association football division - St Helens Recreation F.C. - alongside the rugby club, voted to abandon rugby in toto, and become an association club alone. However, on 14 June 1913, to settle the future of the club, it was announced that it was to abandon association football to concentrate on rugby football. After considerable discussion, it was unanimously agreed to join the constitution of the Northern Rugby Football Union (later the Rugby Football League) and were elected to the Lancashire Combination in July 1913. The Recs, still officially known as the St Helens Recs, were based at City Road and played their first game on 6 September 1913.

In 1915 to bolster the ranks of the war time league, St Helens Recreation along with Brighouse Rangers and Featherstone Rovers were promoted from district leagues to join the senior clubs for the duration of the conflict. In June 1919 the Recs were admitted as full member of the Northern Rugby League. During the 1920s, and 1930s, the Recs played at every level of competition, hosting visiting Australian touring sides and gaining honours in the game, including; winning the Lancashire league in the 1926–27 season, winning the 1923 (17-0 victory over Swinton), and 1930 Lancashire Cups (18-3 victory over Wigan), and being runners-up in the 1924 (0-10 defeat by Oldham), 1926 (2-10 defeat by St. Helens), and 1933 Lancashire Cups (0-12 defeat by Oldham). Despite their success on the pitch, they played their last game on 29 April 1939. The game was away at Hull Kingston Rovers, and the Recs lost 25-12.

== Colours ==
The original colours of the rugby club were cardinal jerseys with green trim. In 1889 the club described its colours as maroon and white, probably referring to maroon jerseys and white knickers.

== Ground ==
The club originally played at Boundary Road, and on resumption of rugby, adopted the football side's ground at City Road.

== Honours ==
- Lancashire County Cup: 2
  - 1923-24, 1930–31
- Lancashire League: 1
  - 1926-27

== Players earning international caps while at St Helens Recs ==
- Albert Bailey won caps for England while at St. Helens Recs (1934, France)
- Frank Bowen won caps for Great Britain while at St. Helens Recs in 1928 against New Zealand (3 matches)
- Tommy Dingsdale won caps for England while at St. Helens Recs (1928, Wales)
- Oliver Dolan won caps for England while at St. Helens Recs (1932, Wales)
- Alec Fildes won caps for England while at St. Helens Recs (1927 Wales, 1929 Other Nationalities), and won caps for Great Britain while at St. Helens Recs (1926-27 New Zealand, 2 matches; 1928 Australia, 3 matches; New Zealand, 3 matches; 1929-30 Australia, 3 matches). While at St Helens R.F.C. he was again an international (1932 Australia, New Zealand, 3 matches)
- Johnny Greenall won caps for England while at St. Helens Recs 1923 Wales (2 matches), and won caps for Great Britain while at St. Helens Recs 1921-22 Australia
- Jim Owen won caps for England while at St. Helens Recs 1921 Wales, Other Nationalities, Australia, 1923 Wales (2 matches), and won caps for Great Britain while at St. Helens Recs 1921-22 Australia
- Jimmy Pyke, won a cap for England (RU) while at St. Helens Recs in 1892 against Wales
- Jim Wallace (rugby league) won caps for England while at St. Helens Recs 1925 Wales, 1926 Other Nationalities, and won caps for Great Britain while at St. Helens Recs 1926-27 New Zealand
