= List of Wigan Warriors players =

The Wigan Warriors are an English professional rugby league club based in Wigan, Greater Manchester. Formed in 1872, the club was a founding member of the Northern Rugby Football Union in 1895, and competed in the inaugural season of the Northern Union's league championship. Since then, more than 1,100 players have appeared for the club's first team.

Jim Sullivan has made the most career appearances for Wigan, having played 774 games between 1921 and 1946. Sullivan is also the club's all-time top goal scorer (2,317) and point scorer (4,883), and holds the club record for most points scored in a single match, with 44 against Flimby & Fothergill in 1925.

The try scoring record is held by Billy Boston, who touched down 478 times for the club. Martin Offiah and Shaun Edwards share the record for most tries scored in one game, with Offiah scoring ten tries against Leeds in 1992 before Edwards repeated the feat against Swinton later that year.

== List of players ==
The following is a list of rugby league players who have made 100 or more appearances for Wigan since the formation of the Northern Union in 1895. Appearances include all official league and cup games, but exclude friendlies. The list is ordered by date of debut, then by surname and first name.

Key
Symbol	Meaning
*	Inducted into the Hall of Fame
^	Club record holder
+	Played for Wigan prior to the formation of the Northern Union in 1895

Positions
FB	Fullback	UB	Utility back
WG	Wing	UB	Utility back
CN	Centre	UB	Utility back
SO	Stand-off	UB	Utility back
SH	Scrum-half	UB	Utility back
PR	Prop	FW	Forward
HK	Hooker	FW	Forward
SR	Second-row	FW	Forward
LF	Loose forward	FW	Forward

Name	Position	Club career	Appearances	Tries	Goals	DGs	Points	Representative	Refs
Jack Blackburn	FW	1895–1900+	129	8	0	—	24	–	
Jack Brown	FW	1895–1903+	258	2	2	—	10	Lancashire	
George Rigby	FW	1895–1902+	188	15	2	—	49	–	
Bill Yates	FW	1895–1902	162	5	0	—	15	Lancashire	
Reuben Collier	FW	1896–1908	227	3	0	—	9	–	
Harry Ball	FW	1898–1903	138	7	0	—	21	–	
Jack Hilton	FW	1898–1906	197	8	1	—	26	–	
Joseph Topping	FW	1900–10	105	4	0	—	12	–	
Tom Halliwell	FW	1900–04	116	3	0	—	9	–	
Jimmy Blears	FW	1901–09	127	7	1	—	23	Lancashire	
Jack Barton	FW	1901–09	213	15	1	—	47	–	
Jack Mason	FB	1902–06	153	2	118	—	242	–	
Billy Anderson	SO	1902–06	149	14	18	—	78	Lancashire	
Fred Gleave	SO	1903–14	193	20	1	—	62	England	
Jim Sharrock	FB	1903–12	278	7	135	—	291	England / Great Britain	
Tom Whittaker	FW	1903–14	297	22	0	—	66	–	
Jimmy Leytham	WG	1903–11	280	258	267	—	1308	England / Great Britain	
Bert Jenkins	CN	1904–20	389	182	0	—	546	Wales / Great Britain	
Johnny Thomas	SH	1904–19	388	108	439	—	1202	Wales / Great Britain	
Dick Ramsdale	FW	1905–20	313	35	0	—	105	England / Great Britain	
Walter Cheetham	FW	1906–10	135	16	0	—	48	–	
Dick Silcock	FW	1907–18	243	16	0	—	48	Great Britain	
Joe Miller	WG	1907–19	206	151	2	—	457	England / Great Britain	
Lance Todd	CN/WG	1908–13	185	126	7	—	392	Lancashire	
Charlie Seeling	LF	1910–20	226	76	0	—	228	Lancashire	
Percy Williams	FW	1910–12	111	17	0	—	51	–	
Frank Walford	WG	1911–24	129	48	8	—	160	–	
Lew Bradley	WG	1911–14	106	117	0	—	351	–	
Percy Coldrick	FW	1912–24	280	79	0	—	237	Wales / Great Britain	
Arthur Francis	FW	1912–19	130	41	44	—	211	–	
Harry Banks	FW	1913–26	142	5	0	—	15	–	
George Owens	SO	1913–27	218	54	8	—	178	Wales	
Syd Jerram	SH	1914–27	245	54	23	—	208	Wales	
George Hesketh	SO	1914–22	114	22	19	—	104	Lancashire	
Bert Webster	FW	1918–24	128	25	0	—	75	–	
Ernest Shaw	FW	1919–22	106	33	1	—	101	England	
Danny Hurcombe	CN/SH	1919–25	199	72	3	—	222	Wales / Great Britain	
Tommy Howley	CN	1920–26	219	101	28	—	359	Wales / Great Britain	
Frederick Roffey	FW	1920–24	159	20	1	—	62	Wales	
Wilf Hodder	PR	1921–30	277	35	0	—	105	Wales	
Jim Sullivan*	FB	1921–45	774^	83	2317	—	4883^	England / Wales / Great Britain	
Johnny Ring	WG	1922–31	331	368	4	—	1112	Wales / Great Britain	
Jack Price	LF	1922–27	177	71	0	—	213	England / Great Britain	
Tommy Parker	CN	1923–30	240	113	0	—	339	Wales	
Attie Van Heerden	WG	1923–26	127	107	0	—	321	Other Nationalities	
George Van Rooyen	SR	1923–28	178	26	0	—	78	Other Nationalities	
John Sherrington	LF	1924–32	198	37	0	—	111	Lancashire	
Tommy Beetham	PR	1924–30	262	10	0	—	30	Cumberland	
David Booysen	CN/SH	1924–28	158	52	2	—	160	Other Nationalities	
Jack Bennett	HK	1925–30	210	5	0	—	15	England / Great Britain	
Frank Stephens	SR	1925–30	207	7	0	—	21	Wales	
Syd Abram	SH	1926–32	171	49	1	—	149	–	
Roy Kinnear	CN	1927–33	184	81	0	—	243	Great Britain	
Lou Brown	WG	1927–30	130	106	0	—	318	Other Nationalities	
Len Mason	SR	1927–35	365	50	5	—	160	Other Nationalities	
Arthur Binks	SO	1927–30	121	15	0	—	45	England	
Hal Jones	SR	1929–33	111	23	0	—	69	(Monmouthshire (historic)) Glamorgan and Monmouthshire	
George Dixon	SR	1929–33	128	7	0	—	21	–	
Gwynne Davies	CN	1930–39	300	127	0	—	381	Wales	
George Bennett	SO	1930–37	232	101	5	—	313	Wales	
Jack Morley	WG	1932–39	292	223	4	—	677	England / Wales / Great Britain	
Hector Gee	SH	1932–44	353	73	3	—	225	–	
Albert Davis	SR	1933–40	181	6	0	—	18	–	
Gordon Innes	CN	1933–37	155	60	4	—	188	–	
Harold Edwards	PR	1933–37	146	8	0	—	24	Wales	
Joe Golby	HK	1934–38	182	10	0	—	30	–	
Alf Ellaby	WG	1934–36	103	90	0	—	270	Lancashire	
Ken Gee*	PR	1935–54	559	54	508	—	1178	England / Great Britain	
Trevor Thomas	SR	1936–39	112	9	0	—	27	–	
Joe Jones	FB	1936–43	113	7	41	—	103	Wales	
George Banks	PR	1936–48	246	14	0	—	42	–	
Ivor Jones	SR	1936–45	106	34	3	—	108	–	
Ted Ward	CN	1938–50, 1953	213	57	480	—	1131	Wales / Great Britain	
Joe Egan*	HK	1938–49	362	28	12	—	108	England / Great Britain	
John Lawrenson	CN	1938–48	219	187	128	—	817	England / Great Britain	
Jackie Bowen	LF	1939–47	149	32	8	—	112	Wales	
Tommy Bradshaw	SH	1939–51	302	35	0	—	105	England / Great Britain	
Jack Simpson	LF	1939–45	113	21	0	—	63	–	
Jack Cunliffe	UB	1939–59	447	85	371	—	997	England / Great Britain	
Jack Cayzer	SR	1940–44	110	27	0	—	81	–	
Jack Maloney	FB/CN	1940–44	106	20	0	—	60	–	
Martin Ryan	FB	1940–52	300	67	63	—	327	England / Great Britain	
Jack Blan	FW	1940–47	184	40	1	—	122	Lancashire	
Jack Fleming	SO	1941–54	131	41	0	—	123	–	
Frank Barton	PR	1941–52	279	35	0	—	105	England / Great Britain	
Jack Hilton	FW	1942–53	137	122	0	—	366	England / Great Britain	
Ernie Ashcroft	CN	1942–58	530	241	0	—	723	England / Great Britain	
Harry Atkinson	SR	1943–48	116	16	0	—	48	–	
Gordon Ratcliffe	WG	1945–53	212	185	0	—	555	England / Great Britain	
Billy Blan	SR/LF	1945–52	255	77	4	—	239	England / Great Britain	
Brian Nordgren	WG	1946–54	294	312	109	—	1154	Other Nationalities	
Cec Mountford	SO	1946–50	210	70	55	—	320	Other Nationalities	
George Roughley	CN	1947–53	123	40	0	—	120	–	
Nat Silcock, Jr.	SR	1947–54	195	64	0	—	192	England / Great Britain	
John Alty	SH	1948–53	155	31	0	—	93	Lancashire	
Ted Slevin	PR/SR	1949–51	113	16	0	—	48	England	
Jack Broome	CN	1949–56	215	59	0	—	177	England	
Ronnie Mather	HK	1950–57	211	11	0	—	33	Lancashire	
Brian McTigue*	SR/PR	1951–66	422	44	3	—	138	Great Britain	
Harry Street	LF	1951–55	163	32	0	—	96	England	
Frank Collier	PR/SR	1951–63	323	26	27	—	132	Great Britain	
Don Platt	FB	1953–58	108	22	47	—	160	–	
Norman Cherrington	SR	1953–62	257	80	0	—	240	England / Great Britain	
Billy Boston*	WG	1953–67	487	478	7	—	1448	Great Britain	
Dave Bolton	SO	1954–63	300	127	4	—	389	Great Britain	
Bill Sayer	HK	1954–65	295	16	0	—	48	Great Britain	
Eric Ashton*	CN	1955–68	497	231	448	—	1589	England / Great Britain	
Bill Bretherton	PR	1956–59	119	13	0	—	39	–	
John Barton	PR	1956–66	278	24	0	—	72	Great Britain	
Rees Thomas	SH	1956–59	102	5	1	—	17	–	
Roy Evans	LF	1957–65	282	34	0	—	102	Great Britain	
Mick Sullivan	WG	1957–60	125	84	0	—	252	Great Britain	
Fred Griffiths	FB	1957–62	161	43	663	—	1455	–	
Keith Holden	CN	1958–67	152	58	0	—	174	Lancashire	
Geoff Lyon	SR	1959–69	328	73	0	—	219	Lancashire	
Frank Carlton	WG	1960–65	123	95	0	—	285	Great Britain	
Frank Parr	SH	1961–71	309	95	15	—	315	Lancashire	
Alan Davies	CN	1961–64	133	52	0	—	156	Lancashire	
Trevor Lake	WG	1962–66	140	132	0	—	396	–	
Colin Clarke*	HK	1963–77	436	75	0	0	225	Great Britain	
John Stephens	PR	1963–78	238	23	0	0	69	England	
Laurie Gilfedder	SR/LF	1963–67	143	17	384	—	819	Lancashire	
Kevin O'Loughlin	U	1964–75	309	57	0	0	171	Great Britain under-24	
Bill Francis	UB	1964–77	400	159	43	0	563	Wales / Great Britain	
Ray Ashby	FB	1964–67	124	10	1	—	32	Great Britain	
Cliff Hill	SO/CN	1964–70	192	57	0	—	171	Great Britain	
Danny Gardiner	PR	1965–68	149	2	0	—	6	Great Britain	
Peter Rowe	CN	1966–73	218	55	0	—	165	Wales	
Colin Tyrer	FB	1967–74	248	88	813	0	1890	Lancashire	
Doug Laughton	LF	1967–72	185	38	0	—	114	Great Britain	
Geoff Fletcher	PR	1967–74	143	18	0	0	54	Lancashire	
Dave Hill	SO/CN	1967–76	329	113	15	0	369	Great Britain	
Bill Ashurst	CN/SR	1968–73, 1977–78	186	74	146	6	520	Great Britain	
Brian Hogan	SR	1968–77	207	19	0	0	57	England	
Stuart Wright	WG	1969–75	173	103	0	0	309	England	
Eddie Cunningham	SR	1969–74	107	45	0	0	135	Lancashire	
David Robinson	SR	1970–74	147	17	0	0	51	Great Britain	
Keiron O'Loughlin	UB	1970–79	260	93	0	0	279	Lancashire	
Warren Ayres	SH	1970–73	131	64	6	—	204	–	
Dennis Ashcroft	PR	1971–76	141	5	2	0	19	–	
Terry Hollingsworth	UF	1971–80	171	26	0	0	78	–	
Jim Nulty	SH	1972–77	185	41	90	9	312	Great Britain under-24	
Billy Melling	SR	1972–81	177	38	0	9	123	Lancashire	
Bernard Coyle, Jr.	SH	1973–80	134	32	0	0	96	–	
Green Vigo	WG	1973–80	168	86	1	0	260	Other Nationalities	
Robert Irving	SR	1973–77	154	40	0	0	120	England	
Jimmy Hornby	WG	1973–82	201	87	3	0	267	Great Britain under-24	
David Willicombe	CN	1974–80	119	36	6	0	120	Wales / Great Britain	
George Fairbairn	FB	1974–80	207	30	583	11	1267	England / Great Britain	
Dennis Ramsdale	WG	1976–84	194	62	4	0	199	–	
Steve O'Neill	PR	1976–81	124	12	0	3	39	England	
Nicky Kiss	HK	1978–89	260	36	0	0	134	Great Britain	
Martin Foy	SO	1979–83	115	34	0	0	103	Lancashire	
John Pendlebury	LF	1979–84	122	29	45	1	182	–	
Danny Campbell	PR	1979–85	145	12	0	0	38	–	
Mick Scott	SR	1981–84	125	12	0	0	41	–	
Henderson Gill	WG	1981–89	226	145	106	0	762	England / Great Britain	
Colin Whitfield	FB/CN	1981–85	149	46	379	13	937	Lancashire	
Shaun Wane	PR	1982–90	149	11	0	0	43	Great Britain	
David Stephenson	CN	1982–87	214	71	286	6	845	Great Britain	
Graeme West	SR/PR	1982–90	202	49	0	0	189	New Zealand	
Brian Case	PR	1983–88	197	14	0	0	54	Great Britain	
Shaun Edwards*	SO/SH	1983–97	466	274	23	4	1146	England / Great Britain	
Steve Hampson	FB	1983–93	304	55	48	3	319	Great Britain	
Ian Potter	SR	1984–88	190	12	0	0	48	Great Britain	
Martin Dermott	HK	1985–96	231	21	0	3	87	Great Britain	
Ian Lucas	PR	1985–92	178	12	0	0	48	Great Britain	
Andy Goodway	SR/LF	1985–92	224	79	0	0	316	Great Britain	
Ellery Hanley*	SO/LF	1985–90	204	189	9	2	776	Great Britain	
Joe Lydon	UB	1986–94	262	89	283	16	938	Great Britain	
Dean Bell*	CN	1986–94	253	96	0	0	384	New Zealand	
Ian Gildart	SR	1987–94	139	4	0	0	16	Great Britain under-21	
Andy Gregory*	SH	1987–91	182	17	22	6	118	Great Britain	
Denis Betts	SR	1987–95, 1998–2001	367	129	1	0	518	Great Britain	
Ged Byrne	UB	1987–90	107	25	0	0	100	Lancashire	
Kevin Iro	CN	1987–90	100	60	36	0	312	New Zealand	
Andy Platt	PR	1988–94	200	24	0	0	96	Great Britain	
Phil Clarke	LF	1989–95	154	23	0	0	92	England / Great Britain	
Frano Botica*	SO/WG	1990–95	180	66	827	13	1931	New Zealand	
Kelvin Skerrett	PR	1990–96	176	21	0	0	84	Wales / Great Britain	
Sam Panapa	UB	1991–94	119	45	0	0	180	–	
Neil Cowie	PR	1991–2001	330	34	0	1	137	Wales / Great Britain	
Andy Farrell*	LF	1991–2005	370	111	1336	19	3135	England / Great Britain	
Martin Offiah*	WG	1992–96	159	186	1	3	749	England / Great Britain	
Mick Cassidy	SR	1992–2004	368	52	0	0	208	England / Ireland / Great Britain	
Jason Robinson	WG	1992–2000	281	171	0	1	685	England / Great Britain	
Martin Hall	HK	1993–97	141	29	18	1	153	Wales	
Gary Connolly	CN	1993–2002, 2004	313	137	6	0	560	England / Ireland / Great Britain	
Kris Radlinski*	FB	1993–2006	323	183	1	0	734	England / Great Britain	
Simon Haughton	SR	1993–2002	174	55	0	0	220	England / Great Britain	
Va'aiga Tuigamala	CN/WG	1994–97	102	62	3	0	254	Samoa	
Henry Paul	SO	1994–98	147	78	119	0	550	New Zealand	
Terry O'Connor	PR	1994–2004	306	13	0	0	52	Ireland / Great Britain	
Paul Johnson	CN/SR	1995–2003	133	56	0	0	224	Great Britain	
Mark Smith	HK	1999–2004	124	12	0	0	48	–	
Brett Dallas	WG	2000–06	177	107	0	0	428	–	
Terry Newton	HK	2000–05	186	73	0	0	292	England / Great Britain	
David Hodgson	CN/WG	2000–04	117	48	0	0	192	Great Britain	
Adrian Lam	SH	2001–04	119	44	1	10	188	–	
Martin Aspinwall	CN	2001–05	109	33	0	0	132	England A	
Brian Carney	WG	2001–05	111	48	1	0	194	Great Britain	
Stephen Wild	CN/SR	2001–05	100	30	0	0	120	England / Great Britain	
Sean O'Loughlin*	LF	2002–20	459	88	3	2	360	England / Great Britain	
Danny Tickle	SR	2002–06	141	34	217	2	572	England A	
Gareth Hock	SR	2003–12	191	48	0	0	192	England / Great Britain	
Harrison Hansen	SR	2004–13	242	43	0	0	172	New Zealand / Samoa	
Paul Prescott	PR	2004–13	146	5	0	0	20	Ireland	
Joel Tomkins	SR/CN	2005–11, 2014–18	236	65	0	0	260	England	
Darrell Goulding	CN	2005–14	174	72	0	0	288	England	
Iafeta Paleaaesina	PR	2006–10	145	21	0	0	84	New Zealand	
Pat Richards	WG	2006–13	224	168	896	4	2468	Ireland	
Stuart Fielden	PR	2006–12	141	3	0	0	12	England / Great Britain	
Phil Bailey	CN/SR	2007–10	101	15	0	0	60	–	
Thomas Leuluai	SH	2007–12, 2017–22	327	74	0	1	297	New Zealand	
Michael McIlorum	HK	2007–17	241	24	0	0	96	England / Ireland	
George Carmont	CN	2008–12	154	80	0	0	320	Samoa	
Andy Coley	PR	2008–11	125	13	0	0	52	–	
Lee Mossop	PR	2008–13, 2015–16	165	13	0	0	52	England	
Sam Tomkins	FB	2008–13, 2016–18	213	168	137	10	956	England	
Josh Charnley	WG	2010–16	173	164	103	0	862	England	
Liam Farrell	SR/LF	2010–	321	130	0	0	520	England	
Dom Crosby	PR	2012–16	102	7	0	0	28	–	
Matty Smith	SH	2012–16	139	22	304	25	721	England	
Anthony Gelling	CN	2012–17	115	52	0	0	208	Cook Islands	
Ben Flower	PR	2012–20	184	21	0	0	84	Wales	
Sam Powell	HK	2012–	250	40	12	4	188	England Knights	
Joe Burgess	WG	2013–15, 2017–20	129	107	0	0	428	England	
George Williams	SO	2013–19	179	61	70	1	385	England	
Dan Sarginson	CN	2014–16, 2018–19	125	35	0	0	140	England	
John Bateman	SR	2014–18, 2021–22	174	40	0	0	160	England	
Ryan Sutton	PR	2014–18	118	11	0	0	44	–	
Tony Clubb	PR	2014–21	165	23	0	0	92	–	
Taulima Tautai	PR	2015–19	132	4	0	0	16	–	
Oliver Gildart	CN	2015–21	143	65	0	0	260	England	
Willie Isa	SR	2016–	190	16	0	0	64	–	
Liam Marshall	WG	2017–	122	95	10	0	400	–	
Morgan Smithies	LF	2019–	105	2	0	0	8	England	

== Historically notable players ==
=== Hall of Fame ===
Name	Nationality	Year of induction	Ref.
Billy Boston	(Wales)	1998	
Shaun Edwards	(England)	1998	
Andy Gregory	(England)	1999	
Billy Blan	(England)	1999	(Note: Although reported as a Hall of Fame inductee, Blan is listed as a "life member" on the club's website, and does not appear in the Hall of Fame section as of 2024.)
Dean Bell	(New Zealand)	2007	
Ellery Hanley	(England)	2007	
Frano Botica	(New Zealand)	2016	
Colin Clarke	(England)	2016	
Martin Offiah	(England)	2016	
Sean O'Loughlin	(England)	2020	(Note: Ceremony held in 2022 due to the COVID-19 pandemic in the United Kingdom)
Kris Radlinski	(England)	2020	
Vicky Molyneux	(England)	2023	(Note: First Wigan Warriors Women player)
Bill Ashurst	(England)	2024	
Liam Farrell	(England)	2026	
Graeme West	(New Zealand)	2024	
Eric Ashton	(England)	?	
Joe Egan	(England)	?	
Andy Farrell	(England)	?	
Ken Gee	(England)	?	
Brian McTigue	(England)	?	
Jim Sullivan	(Wales)	?	

=== Player of the Year ===
Year	Player	Ref.
2008	(Ireland) Pat Richards	
2009	(England) Sam Tomkins	
2010	(Ireland) Pat Richards	
2011	(England) Sam Tomkins	
2012	(Samoa) George Carmont	
2013	(England) Sean O'Loughlin	
2014	(England) Sean O'Loughlin	
2015	(England) John Bateman	
2016	(England) John Bateman	
2017	(England) Sean O'Loughlin	
2018	(England) John Bateman	
2019	(England) Zak Hardaker	
2020	(Australia) Bevan French	
2021	(England) Jackson Hastings	
2022	(Australia) Jai Field	
2023	(Lebanon) Abbas Miski	
2024	(England) Jake Wardle	
2025	(Australia) Jai Field	
2026	(Australia) Adam Keighran	

=== Captains ===
(Super League era)

Player	Year	Nation
Andy Farrell	1996–2004	England
Terry Newton	2005	England
Sean O'Loughlin	2006–2020	England
Thomas Leuluai	2021–2022	New Zealand
Liam Farrell	2023–2026	England

=== Testimonials ===
Once players have been at a club for a certain length of time (usually ten years), they may be offered a friendly game celebrating their time at the club, known as a testimonial match. This is a list of players who have received testimonials from Wigan RLFC, in ascending chronological order with respect to when they received it.

- Brian McTigue (1960)
- David Bolton (1964)
- Colin Clarke (1973)
- Dennis Ramsdale (1985)
- Nicholas "Nicky" Kiss (1988)
- Shaun Edwards (OBE) (1993)
- Graeme West (1994)
- Mick Cassidy (2000)
- Andy Farrell (OBE) (2002)
- Denis Betts (2003)
- Terry O'Connor (2004)
- Kris Radlinski (MBE) (2006)
- Sean O'Loughlin (2012)
- Paul Prescott (2014)
- Michael McIlorum (2017)
- Liam Marshall (2026)

=== Team of the Decade ===
In 2005 during the tenth season of the current Super League championship format, the fans of Wigan RLFC voted for their best thirteen players of the 'Nighties' and the 'Naughties', called the Team of the Decade. This is a list of the ballot's resulting thirteen players.

No.	Player name	Position	Years at club
1	Kris Radlinski (MBE)	Fullback	1993–2006
2	Jason Robinson (OBE)	Wing	1992–2000
3	Va'aiga Tuigamala (MNZM)	Centre	1993–1996
4	Gary Connolly	Centre	1992–2002, 2004
5	Martin Offiah (MBE)	Wing	1991–1996
6	Henry Paul	Five-eighth	1994–1998
7	Shaun Edwards (OBE)	Halfback	1983–1996
8	Craig Smith	Prop	2002–2004
9	Terry Newton	Hooker	2000–2005
10	Terry O'Connor	Prop	1994–2004
11	Denis Betts	Second-row	1986–1995, 1998–2001
12	Mick Cassidy	Second-row	1990–2004
13	Andy Farrell (OBE)	Lock	1991–2004
