= List of Wigan Warriors internationals =

The following is a list of players who have earned international caps by playing for their respective countries' national sides whilst at Wigan RLFC. Numbers refer to the position the player was selected for, with No. 14 and No. 15 referring to interchanges after the sport reduced the number of players in a team from fifteen to thirteen in 1906. Note that all of the player's international appearances are listed here, even if they were made whilst the player was at another club.

== Players ==
- Paul Atcheson won caps for Wales while at Wigan in 1995 against England, and France, in the 1995 Rugby League World Cup against Western Samoa, while at Oldham in 1996 against France, and England, while at St. Helens in 1998 against England, while at Widnes in 2000 against South Africa, in the 2000 Rugby League World Cup against Cook Islands, Lebanon, New Zealand, Papua New Guinea, and Australia, in 2001 against England, in 2002 against New Zealand, and in 2003 against Russia, and Australia, and won caps for Great Britain while at St. Helens in 1997 against Australia (SL) (3 matches)
- Raymond "Ray" Ashby won caps for Great Britain while at Liverpool City in 1964 France, while at Wigan in 1965 France
- Ernest "Ernie" Ashcroft won caps for England while at Wigan in 1946 Wales, in 1947 France, Wales, in 1948 France, in 1949 France, Other Nationalities, in 1950 Wales, France, in 1951 Other Nationalities, Wales, France, and won caps for Great Britain while at Wigan in 1947 New Zealand (2 matches), in 1950 Australia (3 matches), New Zealand, in 1954 Australia (3 matches), New Zealand (2 matches) won caps for British Empire XIII while at Wigan in 1952 New Zealand (Reserve)
- Chris Ashton won caps for England while at Wigan in 2006 France (sub), Tonga, Tonga (sub), Samoa
- Eric Ashton won caps for England while at Wigan in 1962 France, and won caps for Great Britain while at in 1957 Australia, New Zealand, in 1958 Australia (2 matches), New Zealand (2 matches), in 1959 France, Australia (3 matches), in 1960 France (2 matches), in 1960 New Zealand, Australia, in 1961 New Zealand (3 matches), in 1962 France (3 matches), Australia (3 matches), in 1963 France, Australia (2 matches) (World Cup in 1957 2-caps, in 1960 Captain 2-caps, 1-try)
- Frank Barton won caps for England while at Wigan in 1951 Other Nationalities, in 1952 Other Nationalities, and won caps for Great Britain while at Wigan in 1951 New Zealand
- John Barton won caps for Great Britain while at Wigan in 1960 against France, and in 1961 against New Zealand
- John "Jack" Bennett won caps for England while at Rochdale Hornets in 1924 Other Nationalities, in 1925 Wales, while at Rochdale Hornets in 1926 Wales, Other Nationalities, and won caps for Great Britain while at Rochdale Hornets in 1924 Australia (3 matches), New Zealand (3 matches), while at Wigan in 1926 New Zealand
- George Bennett won caps for Wales while at Wigan 1935…1936 3-caps
- Denis Betts won caps for England while at Auckland Warriors in 1995 Australia (2 matches), Fiji, Wales, and won caps for Great Britain while at Wigan in 1990 France, France (sub), Papua New Guinea (2 matches), New Zealand (3 matches), Australia (3 matches), in 1991 France, Papua New Guinea, in 1992 France, Papua New Guinea, Australia (3 matches), New Zealand (2 matches), Australia, in 1993 France, New Zealand, in 1994 Australia (3 matches), in 1996 while at Auckland Papua New Guinea, Fiji, New Zealand (3 matches), while at Wigan in 1999 Australia, New Zealand (sub)
- David "Dai" Royston "Roy" Bevan won caps for Wales while at Wigan 1953 2-caps, and won a cap for Great Britain while at Wigan in 1952 against Australia, and also represented Great Britain while at Wigan/Halifax between 1952 and 1956 against France (1 non-Test match)
- Arthur Binks won caps for England while at Wigan in 1929 Other Nationalities
- William "Billy" Blan won caps for England while at Wigan in 1951 Wales, France, in 1952 Other Nationalities, and won caps for Great Britain while at Wigan in 1951 New Zealand (3 matches)
- Billy Boston MBE †, and won caps for Great Britain while at Wigan in 1954…62 31-caps (World Cup in 1957 2-caps, 1-try, in 1960 1-cap, 1-try)
- Benjamin John "Jackie" Bowen won caps for Wales while at Wigan, and Leigh 1945…48 2-caps
- Thomas "Tommy" Bradshaw won caps for England while at Wigan in 1944 Wales, in 1945 Wales, in 1946 Wales, France, in 1947 France (2 matches), Wales (2 matches), in 1948 France, in 1949 Other Nationalities, France, in 1950 Wales (2 matches), in 1951 Other Nationalities, and won caps for Great Britain while at Wigan in 1947 New Zealand (2 matches), in 1950 Australia (3 matches), New Zealand
- John "Jack" Broome won caps for England while at Wigan in 1950 Wales, France won caps for British Empire XIII while at Wigan in 1952 New Zealand
- Edward "Ned" Bullough won caps for England (RU) while at Wigan in 1892 against Wales, Ireland, and Scotland
- Mark Calderwood won caps for England while at Leeds in 2004 France, Ireland, in 2005 France, New Zealand, while at Wigan in 2006 France, Tonga (2 matches)
- Brian Case won caps for England while at Warrington in 1981 France, and won caps for Great Britain while at Wigan in 1984 Australia, New Zealand (3 matches), in 1987 Papua New Guinea, in 1988 Papua New Guinea, Australia (sub)
- Mick Cassidy won caps for England while at Wigan in 1995 Wales (sub), Fiji, South Africa, Wales (sub), Australia (sub), in 1996 Wales (sub), and won caps for Great Britain while at Wigan in 1994 Australia (sub) (2 matches), in 1996 Fiji (sub), in 1997 ASL
- Norman Cherrington won caps for England while at Wigan in 1956 France, and won caps for Great Britain while at Wigan in 1960 France
- Colin Clarke won caps for Great Britain while at Wigan Wigan in 1965 against New Zealand, in 1966 against France, and New Zealand, in 1967 against France, and in 1973 against Australia (3 matches)
- Phil Clarke won caps for England while at Wigan in 1992 Wales, in 1995 Wales, while at Sydney Australia (2 matches), South Africa, Wales, and won caps for Great Britain while at Wigan in 1990 Papua New Guinea (sub), in 1992 Papua New Guinea, Australia (3 matches), New Zealand (2 matches), Australia, in 1993 France (2 matches), New Zealand (3 matches), in 1994 Australia (3 matches)
- Percy Coldrick won caps for Wales while at Wigan 1913…1914 2-caps
- Frank Collier won caps for Great Britain while at Wigan in 1963 against Australia, and in 1964 against France
- Gary Connolly won caps for England while at St. Helens in 1992 Wales, while at Wigan in 1995 Australia, in 1996 France, Wales, and won caps for Great Britain while at St. Helens in 1991 Papua New Guinea (sub), in 1992 France (2 matches), Australia (sub) (2 matches), New Zealand (2 matches), Australia, in 1993 France (2 matches), while at Wigan in 1993 New Zealand (3 matches), in 1994 France, Australia (3 matches), in 1998 New Zealand (3 matches), in 1999 Australia, New Zealand, in 2001 France, Australia (3 matches), in 2002 New Zealand (3 matches), while at Leeds in 2003 Australia (2 matches)
- Neil Cowie won caps for Wales while at Wigan in 1995 against England, and France, and in the 1995 Rugby League World Cup against Western Samoa, in 1996 against England, in 1998 against England, and in 1999 against Ireland, and Scotland, and won caps for Great Britain while at Wigan in 1993 against France, and in 1998 against New Zealand (2 matches)
- Jack Cunliffe won caps for England while at Wigan in 1949 France, in 1950 France (2 matches), Wales, in 1951 Other Nationalities, Wales, in 1956 France, and won caps for Great Britain while at Wigan in 1950 Australia, New Zealand, in 1951 New Zealand, in 1954 Australia won caps for British Empire XIII while at Wigan in 1952 New Zealand
- Eli Davies won caps for Other Nationalities while at Wigan in 1904 against England
- Eiryn Gwyn Davies won caps for Wales (RU) while at Cardiff RFC in 1928 against France, in 1929 against England, and in 1930 against Scotland, and won caps for Wales (RL) while at Wigan 1932…1935 3-caps
- Wes Davies won caps for Wales while at Wigan 1999…2000 3(8?)-caps + 5-caps (sub) 3-tries 12-points
- Howell de Francis won a cap for Wales while at Wigan in 1909 against England
- Gareth Dean won caps for Wales while at Wigan, unattached, Workington Town, AS Carcassonne, and Celtic Crusaders 2001…2007 7(10, 12?)-caps + 4-caps (sub)
- Harold Edwards won caps for Wales while at Wigan, and Bradford Northern 1935…1938 2-caps
- Shaun Edwards won caps for England while at Wigan in 1995 Australia, in 1996 France, Wales, and won caps for Great Britain while at Wigan in 1985 France, New Zealand, New Zealand (sub), in 1986 Australia (sub), in 1987 France (2 matches), Papua New Guinea, in 1988 France (2 matches), Papua New Guinea, in 1989 France (2 matches), New Zealand (2 matches), New Zealand (sub), in 1990 France (2 matches), in 1991 France (2 matches), Papua New Guinea, in 1992 France, Papua New Guinea, Australia (2 matches), Australia (sub), New Zealand (2 matches), Australia, in 1993 France (2 matches), New Zealand (3 matches), in 1994 France, Australia (2 matches)
- Joe Egan won caps for England while at Wigan in 1943 Wales, in 1944 Wales, in 1945 Wales (2 matches), in 1946 France (2 matches), Wales (2 matches), in 1947 France (2 matches), Wales (2 matches), in 1948 France (2 matches), Wales, in 1949 Wales, France, Other Nationalities, in 1950 Wales, while at Leigh Wales, France, and won caps for Great Britain while at Wigan in 1946 Australia (3 matches), in 1947 New Zealand (3 matches), in 1948 Australia (3 matches), in 1950 Australia (3 matches), New Zealand (2 matches)
- Alf Ellaby won caps for England while at St. Helens in 1927 Wales, in 1928 Wales (2 matches), in 1930 Other Nationalities, in 1931 Wales, in 1932 Wales (2 matches), in 1934 France, while at Wigan in 1935 France, and won caps for Great Britain while at St. Helens in 1928 Australia (3 matches), New Zealand (2 matches), in 1929–30 Australia (2 matches), in 1932 Australia (3 matches), New Zealand (2 matches), in 1933 Australia
- Roy Evans won caps for Great Britain while at Wigan in 1961 against New Zealand (2 matches), and in 1962 against France, and New Zealand
- George Fairbairn won caps for England while at Wigan in 1975 Wales (2 matches), New Zealand (2 matches), Australia (2 matches), France, Papua New Guinea, in 1977 Wales, France, in 1978 France, in 1980 Wales, France, in 1981 France, Wales, while at Hull K.R. Wales, and won caps for Great Britain while at Wigan in 1977 France, New Zealand, Australia (2 matches), in 1978 Australia (3 matches), in 1979 Australia (2 matches), New Zealand (3 matches), in 1980 New Zealand (2 matches), while at Hull K.R. in 1981 France, in 1982 Australia (2 matches)
- Andrew "Andy" Farrell won caps for England while at Wigan in 1995 Australia (2 matches), Fiji, Wales, in 1996 Wales, in 2000 Australia, Russia, Fiji, Ireland, New Zealand, in 2001 Wales, and won caps for Great Britain while at Wigan in 1993 New Zealand, 1994 France, Australia (3 matches), Papua New Guinea, Fiji, New Zealand (3 matches), in 1997 ASL (3 matches), in 1998 New Zealand (3 matches), in 1999 Australia, New Zealand, in 2001 France, Australia (3 matches), in 2002 Australia, New Zealand (3 matches), in 2003 Australia (3 matches), in 2004 Australia (3 matches), New Zealand (2 matches)
- Stuart Fielden won caps for England while at Bradford Bulls in 2000 Australia, Russia (sub), Fiji (sub), Ireland, New Zealand, and won caps for Great Britain while at Bradford Bulls in 2001 Australia, Australia (sub) (2 matches), France (sub), in 2002 Australia, New Zealand (3 matches), in 2003 Australia (3 matches), in 2004 Australia (3 matches), New Zealand (2 matches), in 2005 Australia (2 matches), New Zealand (2 matches), while at Wigan in 2006 New Zealand (3 matches), Australia (2 matches)
- Ness Flowers won caps for Wales while at Wigan, and Cardiff City (Bridgend) Blue Dragons 1980…1984 4-caps 1-tries 3-points
- Terrence "Terry" Fogerty represented Commonwealth XIII while at Halifax in 1965 against New Zealand at Crystal Palace National Recreation Centre, London on Wednesday 18 August 1965, and won caps for Great Britain while at Halifax in 1966 against New Zealand, while at Wigan in 1967 against France, and while at Rochdale Hornets in 1974 against France
- Bill Francis won caps for Wales while at Wigan in 1975 against France, England, in the 1975 Rugby League World Cup against France, England, Australia, New Zealand, England, Australia, New Zealand, and France, in 1977 against England, and France, while at St. Helens in 1978 against France, England, and Australia, in 1979 against France, and England, while at Oldham in 1980 against France, and England, and won caps for Great Britain while at Wigan in 1967 against Australia, and in the 1977 Rugby League World Cup against New Zealand, Australia (2 matches) (World Cup in 1975 8-caps, 4-tries)
- Daniel "Danny" Gardiner won caps for Great Britain while at Wigan in 1965 against New Zealand
- Ken Gee won caps for England while at Wigan in 1943 Wales, in 1944 Wales, in 1946 France (2 matches), Wales (2 matches), in 1947 France (2 matches), Wales, in 1948 France (2 matches), in 1949 Wales, France (2 matches), in 1950 Wales, France, in 1951 Other Nationalities, Wales, France, and won caps for Great Britain while at Wigan in 1946 Australia (3 matches), New Zealand, in 1947 New Zealand (3 matches), in 1948–49 Australia (3 matches), in 1950 Australia (3 matches), New Zealand (2 matches), in 1951 New Zealand (2 matches)
- Henderson Gill won caps for England while at Wigan in 1981 Wales, and won caps for Great Britain while at Wigan in 1981 France (2 matches), in 1982 Australia, in 1985 France, in 1986 France, Australia (3 matches), in 1987 France (2 matches), in 1988 Papua New Guinea, Australia (2 matches), Australia (sub), New Zealand
- Brian Gregory won caps for Wales while at Wigan in the 1975 Rugby League World Cup against England, New Zealand, and France
- Danny Hurcombe won caps for Great Britain while at Wigan ?-caps
- Frederick "Fred" Gleave won caps for England while at Wigan in 1913 Wales
- Andy Goodway won caps for England while at Oldham in 1984 Wales, and won caps for Great Britain while at Oldham in 1983 France (2 matches), in 1984 France, Australia (3 matches), New Zealand (3 matches), Papua New Guinea, in 1985 France, while at Wigan in 1985 New Zealand (3 matches), in 1986 Australia (3 matches), in 1987 France, Papua New Guinea, in 1989 New Zealand (3 matches), in 1990 France
- Bobbie Goulding won caps for England while at St. Helens in 1995 Fiji, South Africa, Wales, Australia, in 1996 Wales (sub), and won caps for Great Britain while at Wigan in 1990 Papua New Guinea (2 matches), New Zealand (3 matches), while at Leeds in 1992 France, while at St. Helens in 1994 Australia, Australia (sub) (2 matches), in 1996 Papua New Guinea, Fiji, New Zealand (3 matches), in 1997 ASL (3 matches)
- John Gray won caps for England while at Wigan in 1975 France, Wales, France, and won caps for Great Britain while at Wigan in 1974 France (sub) (2 matches), Australia (2 matches), Australia (sub), New Zealand (3 matches)
- Brian Gregory won caps for Wales while at Wigan in the 1975 Rugby League World Cup against England, New Zealand, and France (World Cup in 1975 3-caps, 1-try)
- Martin Hall won caps for Wales while at Wigan 1995…1996 7-caps + 3-caps (sub)
- Ellery Hanley won caps for England while at Bradford Northern in 1984 Wales, while at Leeds in 1992 Wales, and won caps for Great Britain while at Bradford Northern in 1984 France (sub), France, Australia (3 matches), New Zealand (3 matches), Papua New Guinea, in 1985 France (2 matches), while at Wigan in 1985 New Zealand (3 matches), in 1986 France, Australia, in 1987 France (2 matches), Papua New Guinea, in 1988 France (2 matches), Papua New Guinea, Australia (3 matches), New Zealand, in 1989 France (2 matches), in 1990 France, Australia (3 matches), in 1991 France (2 matches), while at Leeds in 1992 Australia, in 1993 France
- David "Dai" Harris won caps for Other Nationalities while at Wigan in 1904 against England
- Simon Haughton won caps for England while at Wigan in 1995 Australia (sub), Fiji (sub), South Africa, Wales (sub), in 1999 France (2 matches), and won caps for Great Britain while at Wigan in 1997 ASL (2 matches) (sub), in 1998 New Zealand (sub) (3 matches)
- Clifford "Cliff" Hill won caps for Great Britain while at Wigan in 1966 against France
- David Hill won caps for Great Britain while at Wigan in 1971 against France
- John "Jack" Hilton won caps for England while at Wigan in 1949 France, in 1950 Wales, France, and won caps for Great Britain while at Wigan in 1950 Australia (2 matches), New Zealand (2 matches)
- David Hodgson won caps for England while at Salford in 2005 New Zealand, in 2006 Tonga (2 matches), Samoa, and won caps for Great Britain while at Wigan in 2001 France, Australia (sub), while at Salford in 2007 France, New Zealand
- Brian Hogan won caps for England while at Wigan in 1975 Wales, France, New Zealand, Australia, in 1977 Wales
- Wilfred "Wilf" Hodder won caps for Wales (RU) while at Pontypool RFC in 1921 against England, Scotland, and France, and won caps for Wales (RL) while at Wigan 1922…1928 6-caps, including the 34–8 victory over New Zealand at Pontypridd in 1926, and five losses to England
- Louis "Lou" Houghton won caps for England while at St. Helens in 1927 Wales, while at Wigan in 1931 Wales
- Thomas "Tommy" Howley Thomas Howley won caps for Wales while at Wigan 1921…1925 4-caps, and won caps for Great Britain while at Wigan in 1924 against Australia (3 matches), and New Zealand (3 matches)
- Bill Hudson won caps for England while at Batley in 1946 Wales, France, in 1947 France, while at Wigan in 1949 France, and won caps for Great Britain while at Wigan in 1948 Australia
- Daniel "Danny" Hurcombe won caps for Wales while at Wigan 1921…1926 6-caps, and won caps for Great Britain while at Wigan in 1920 against Australia (2 matches), and New Zealand, in 1922 against Australia, and in 1924 against Australia (2 matches), and New Zealand (2 matches)
- Robert Irving won caps for England while at Wigan in 1975 Wales, France, Australia, and won caps for Great Britain while at Oldham in 1967 France (2 matches), Australia (3 matches), in 1970 Australia (sub), New Zealand, in 1971 New Zealand, in 1972 France (sub), New Zealand, Australia (sub)
- T. B. "Bert" Jenkins won caps for Wales while at Wigan in 1908 against New Zealand, and in 1909 against England, and won caps for Great Britain while at Wigan in 1908 against New Zealand (3 matches), and Australia (3 matches), in 1909 against Australia (2 matches), in 1910 against Australia, Australasia (2 matches), and New Zealand, in 1911 against Australia, in 1912 against Australia, and in 1914 against Australia, and New Zealand
- Sidney "Sid"/"Syd" Jerram won caps for Wales while at Wigan 1921…1925 5-caps
- Joe Jones won caps for Wales while at Wigan and Barrow 1940…1949 15-caps, and won a cap for Great Britain while at Barrow in 1946 against New Zealand
- Keri Jones won caps for Wales (RU) while at Cardiff RFC (RU) 5-caps, and won caps for Great Britain while at Wigan in 1970 France, New Zealand (World Cup in 1970 2-caps)
- Brian Juliff won caps for Wales while at Wakefield Trinity in 1979 against France, and England, in 1980 against France, and England, in 1981 against France, and England, and while at Wigan in 1982 against Australia, and in 1984 against England
- Roy Kinnear won caps for Scotland (RU) while at Heriot's Rugby Club (RU) in 1926 3-caps won caps for Great Britain (RU) while at Heriot's Rugby Club (RU) ?-caps won caps for Other Nationalities (RL) while at Wigan (RL) 3-caps won caps for Great Britain (RL) while at Wigan (RL) 1-cap, (signed for Wigan in 1926–27)
- Nicholas "Nicky" Kiss won a cap for Great Britain while at Wigan in 1985 against France
- Trevor Lake represented Commonwealth XIII while at Wigan in 1965 against New Zealand at Crystal Palace National Recreation Centre London on Wednesday 18 August 1965,
- Doug Laughton won caps for England while at Widnes in 1977 Wales, and won caps for Great Britain while at Wigan in 1970 Australia (3 matches), New Zealand (2 matches), Australia (2 matches), France, New Zealand, in 1971 France (2 matches), while at Widnes in 1973 Australia, in 1974 France (2 matches), in 1979 Australia (World Cup in 1970 4-caps, 1-try)
- Johnny "Johnny" Lawrenson won caps for England while at Wigan in 1939 Wales, in 1940 Wales, in 1941 Wales, in 1946 Wales (2 matches), in 1948 Wales, France, in 1949 Wales, Other Nationalities, while at Workington in 1950 [Opposition?], and won caps for Great Britain while at Wigan in 1948 Australia (3 matches)
- James "Jim" Leytham won caps for England while at Wigan in 1905 Other Nationalities, in 1906 Other Nationalities, in 1908 New Zealand, in 1910 Wales (2 matches), and won caps for Great Britain while at Wigan in 1908 New Zealand (2 matches), in 1910 Australia (2 matches), New Zealand
- Ian Lucas won caps for Great Britain while at Wigan in 1991 against France, and in 1992 against Australia
- Barrie-Jon Mather won caps for England while at Wigan in 1995 Australia, South Africa, and won caps for Great Britain while at Wigan in 1994 France (sub), while at Perth in 1996 New Zealand, New Zealand (sub)
- Barrie McDermott won caps for England while at Leeds in 1996 Wales (sub), and won caps for Great Britain while at Wigan in 1994 Australia, Australia (sub) (2 matches), while at Leeds in 1999 Australia, New Zealand, in 2001 France, Australia (3 matches), in 2002 Australia, New Zealand (2 matches), in 2003 Australia, Australia (sub) (2 matches)
- Brian McTigue †, and won caps for Great Britain while at Wigan in 1958…63 25-caps (World Cup in 1960 3-caps, 1-try)
- Joseph "Joe" Miller won caps for England while at Wigan in 1909 Australia, in 1910 Wales, in 1911 Wales, and won caps for Great Britain while at Wigan in 1911 against Australia
- William "Bill" Morgan won a cap for 'Wales while at Wigan in 1932
- John "Jack" Morley won caps for England while at Wigan in 1933 Australia, won caps for Wales while at Wigan 1932…1936 5-caps, and won caps for Great Britain while at Wigan in 1936 Australia, in 1937 Australia
- Terry Newton won caps for England while at Leeds in 1999 France (2 matches), while at Wigan in 2001 Wales, and won caps for Great Britain while at Leeds in 1998 New Zealand, while at Wigan in 2002 Australia (sub), in 2003 Australia (3 matches), in 2004 Australia (3 matches), New Zealand, while at Bradford Bulls in 2006 New Zealand (2 matches), New Zealand (sub), Australia (2 matches), in 2007 New Zealand
- Steve O'Neill won caps for England while at Wigan in 1981 France
- Martin Offiah won caps for England while at Wigan in 1992 Wales, in 1995 South Africa, Wales, Australia, in 1996 France, and won caps for Great Britain while at Widnes in 1988 France, Australia (3 matches), New Zealand, in 1989 France (2 matches), New Zealand (3 matches), in 1990 France (2 matches), New Zealand (3 matches), Australia (3 matches), in 1991 France (2 matches), while at Wigan in 1992 Papua New Guinea, Australia (3 matches), New Zealand (2 matches), Australia, in 1993 New Zealand (2 matches), in 1994 France, Australia (3 matches)
- George Owens won a cap for Wales while at Wigan in 1923
- Thomas "Tommy" Parker won caps for Wales while at Wigan 1928…1930 2-caps
- Henry Paul won caps for New Zealand while at Wigan c.-1995 ?-caps
- Andy Platt won caps for England while at Widnes/Auckland in 1995 Australia (2 matches), South Africa, Wales, and won caps for Great Britain while at St. Helens in 1985 France (sub), in 1986 France (sub), Australia (sub), in 1988 France (2 matches), Australia (2 matches), while at Wigan in 1989 New Zealand (3 matches), in 1990 France, Australia (2 matches), in 1991 France (2 matches), Papua New Guinea, in 1992 France (sub), Papua New Guinea, Australia (3 matches), New Zealand (2 matches), Australia, in 1993 France
- Ian Potter won caps for England while at Warrington in 1981 France, Wales, and won caps for Great Britain while at Wigan in 1985 New Zealand (3 matches), in 1986 France (2 matches), Australia (2 matches), Australia (sub)
- John "Jack" Price won caps for England while at Broughton in 1921 Australia, while at Wigan in 1922 Wales, in 1924 Other Nationalities, and won caps for Great Britain while at Broughton in 1921–22 Australia (2 matches), while at Wigan in 1924 Australia (2 matches), New Zealand (2 matches)
- Scott Quinnell won caps for Wales while at Wigan 1995(…1996?) (2?)4-caps
- Kris Radlinski won caps for England while at Wigan in 1995 Australia (2 matches), Fiji, South Africa (sub), Wales, in 2000 Australia, Fiji, Ireland, New Zealand, in 2001 Wales, and won caps for Great Britain while at Wigan in 1996 Papua New Guinea, Fiji, New Zealand (3 matches), in 1997 ASL (3 matches), in 1998 New Zealand (3 matches), in 1999 Australia, New Zealand, in 2001 France, Australia (2 matches), in 2002 Australia, in 2003 Australia (3 matches)
- Richard "Dick" Ramsdale won caps for England while at Wigan in 1910 Wales, in 1911 Australia (2 matches), in 1913 Wales, in 1914 Wales, and won caps for Great Britain while at Wigan in 1910 Australia (2 matches), in 1911–12 Australia (2 matches), in 1914 Australia (3 matches), New Zealand
- Gordon Ratcliffe won caps for England while at Wigan in 1947 Wales, in 1948 France, in 1949 France, in 1951 Other Nationalities, and won caps for Great Britain while at Wigan in 1947 New Zealand, in 1950 Australia (2 matches)
- Rees Richards won caps for Wales (RU) while at Aberavon RFC in 1913 against Scotland, France, and Ireland, and won caps for Wales (RL) while at Wigan in 1914
- John "Johnny" Ring won a cap for Wales (RU) while at Aberavon in 1921 against England, won caps for Wales (RL) while at Wigan 1925…1930 6-caps, and won caps for Great Britain (RL) while at Wigan in 1924 against Australia, and in 1926 against New Zealand
- David "Dave" Robinson won caps for England while at Swinton in 1969 Wales, and won caps for Great Britain while at Swinton in 1965 New Zealand, in 1966 France (2 matches), Australia (3 matches), New Zealand (2 matches), in 1967 France (2 matches), Australia (2 matches), while at Wigan in 1970 Australia
- Jason Robinson won caps for England while at Wigan in 1995 Wales, Australia (2 matches), Fiji, Wales, in 1996 France, Wales, and won caps for Great Britain while at Wigan in 1993 New Zealand, in 1994 Australia (3 matches), in 1997 ASL (3 matches), in 1998 New Zealand (3 matches), in 1999 Australia, New Zealand
- Luke Robinson won caps for England while at Wigan in 2004 Russia, France, Ireland, while at Salford in 2005 France, New Zealand
- Frederick "Fred" Roffey won caps for Wales while at Wigan, and St. Helens 1921…1926 2-caps
- Peter Rowe won caps for Wales while at Wigan, Blackpool Borough, and Huddersfield 1969…1979 7-caps + 3-caps (sub), including while at Blackpool Borough in the 1975 Rugby League World Cup against Australia, England, and Australia
- Martin Ryan won caps for England while at Wigan in 1943 Wales, in 1945 Wales, in 1946 France (2 matches), Wales, in 1947 Wales (2 matches), in 1948 France (2 matches), in 1949 France (2 matches), in 1950 Wales, and won caps for Great Britain while at Wigan in 1947 New Zealand, in 1948 Australia (2 matches), in 1950 Australia
- William "Bill" Sayer won caps for Great Britain while at Wigan in 1961 New Zealand, in 1962 France, Australia (3 matches), New Zealand, in 1963 Australia
- James "Jim" Sharrock won caps for England while at Wigan in 1910 Wales, in 1911 Australia, and won caps for Great Britain while at Wigan in 1910 Australia (2 matches), New Zealand, in 1911–12 Australia
- Ernest "Ernie" Shaw won caps for England while at Wigan in 1921 Wales, Other Nationalities
- Glyn Shaw won caps for Wales (RU) while at Neath RFC in 1972 against New Zealand, in 1973 against England, Scotland, Ireland, France, and Australia, in 1974 against Scotland, Ireland, France, and England, and in 1977 against Ireland, and France, won caps for Wales (RL) while at Widnes in 1978 against France, and Australia, in 1980 against France, and England, in 1981 against England, in 1982 against Australia, and in 1984 against England, and won a cap for Great Britain (RL) while at Widnes in 1980 against New Zealand
- Kelvin Skerrett won caps for Wales while at Wigan 1995…1998 (7?)6-caps
- Jeremiah "Jerry" Shea won caps for Wales while at Wigan 1922…1923 2-caps
- Dick Silcock won caps for England while at Leigh in 1906 Other Nationalities, and won caps for Great Britain while at Wigan in 1908–09 Australia
- Nathan "Nat" Silcock, Jr. won caps for England while at Wigan in 1951 Other Nationalities, in 1952 Other Nationalities, in 1953 Wales, and won caps for Great Britain while at in 1954 Australia (3 matches)
- Edward "Ted" Slevin won caps for England while at Wigan in 1950 Wales, in 1953 France
- Tony Smith won caps for England while at Castleford in 1995 France (sub), Fiji, South Africa (sub), Wales, Australia, while at Wigan in 2000 Australia, Fiji, Ireland (sub), New Zealand, and won caps for Great Britain while at Castleford in 1996 Papua New Guinea (sub), Fiji (sub), while at Wigan in 1998 New Zealand (3 matches)
- Colin Standing won caps for Wales while at Wigan, and Oldham 1969…1970 2-caps
- Frank Stephens won caps for Wales while at Wigan 1926…1930 4-caps
- John Stephens won caps for England while at Wigan in 1969 Wales, France, in 1970 France
- Harry Street won caps for England while at Dewsbury in 1950 Wales (2 matches), France, while at Wigan in 1951 France, in 1952 Wales, in 1953 France, and won caps for Great Britain while at Dewsbury in 1950 Australia (3 matches), New Zealand
- Jim Sullivan won caps for Wales while at Wigan 1921…1939 27-caps, won caps for England while at Wigan in 1933 Australia, in 1934 Australia, France, and won caps for Great Britain while at Wigan in 1924 Australia (3 matches), New Zealand, in 1926–27 New Zealand (3 matches), in 1928 Australia (3 matches), New Zealand (3 matches), in 1929–30 Australia (3 matches), in 1932 Australia (3 matches), New Zealand (3 matches), in 1933 Australia (3 matches)
- Michael "Mick" Sullivan won caps for England while at Huddersfield in 1955 Other Nationalities, in 1956 France, while at St. Helens in 1962 France, and won caps for Great Britain while at Huddersfield in 1954 France (2 matches), New Zealand, Australia, in 1955 New Zealand (3 matches), in 1956 Australia (3 matches), in 1957 France (3 matches), France, Australia, New Zealand, while at Wigan France (2 matches), in 1958 France, Australia (3 matches), New Zealand (2 matches), in 1959 France (2 matches), Australia (3 matches), in 1960 France (3 matches), France, New Zealand, Australia, while at St. Helens in 1961 France, New Zealand (2 matches), in 1962 France (3 matches), Australia (3 matches), New Zealand, while at York in 1963 Australia (World Cup in 1954 3-caps, 1-try, in 1957 3-caps, 3-tries, in 1960 3-caps, 1-try)
- Gael Tallec England battle to French wins won caps for France while at Wigan c.-1995 ?-caps
- Gwyn Thomas won caps for Wales while at Wigan, and Huddersfield 1914…1921 2-caps, and won caps for Great Britain while at Wigan in 1914 against Australia, while at Huddersfield in 1920 against Australia (3 matches), and New Zealand (2 matches), in 1921 against Australia (2 matches), and in 1922 against Australia
- John "Johnny" Thomas won a caps for Wales while at Wigan including in 1908 against New Zealand, and won caps for Great Britain while at Wigan in 1908 against New Zealand, and Australia, in 1909 against Australia (2 matches), in 1910 against Australia (2 matches), and Australasia (2 matches), and New Zealand, and in 1911 against Australia
- Rees Thomas won a cap for Wales while at Wigan in 1959 against France at Stade des Minimes, Toulouse on Sunday 1 March 1959
- Trevor 'Ocker' Thomas won a cap for Wales (RU) while at Abertillery RFC in 1930 against England, and won caps for Wales (RL) while at Oldham, and Wigan 1932…1940 3-caps
- Va'aiga Tiugamala won caps for Western Samoa while at Wigan c.-1995 ?-caps
- Llewellyn "Llew" Treharne won caps for Wales while at Wigan 1908 2-caps
- Shaun Wane won caps for Great Britain while at Wigan in 1984 against France, and in 1985 against France
- Edward "Ted" Ward won caps for Wales while at Wigan, and Cardiff 1946…1951 13-caps, and won caps for Great Britain while at Wigan in 1946 against Australia (2 matches), and New Zealand
- Edward "Eddie" Watkins won caps for Wales while at Wigan 1941…1945 3-caps
- Les White won caps for England while at York in 1946 France (2 matches), Wales (2 matches), in 1947 France (2 matches), Wales, while at Wigan in 1947 Wales, in 1948 France, Halifax in 1951 Wales, and won caps for Great Britain while at York in 1946 Australia (3 matches), New Zealand, while at Wigan in 1947 New Zealand (2 matches)
- Stephen Wild won caps for England while at Wigan in 2005 New Zealand, and won caps for Great Britain while at Wigan in 2004 Australia (sub), while at Huddersfield in 2007 France
- Gwyn Williams won a cap for Wales while at Wigan in 1939
- David Willicombe won caps for Wales while at Halifax in 1970 against England, while at Wigan in 1975 against France, and England, in the 1975 Rugby League World Cup against France, England, Australia, New Zealand, New Zealand, and France, and in 1978 against France, England, and Australia, and won caps for Great Britain while at Wigan in 1974 against France (2 matches), and New Zealand (World Cup in 1975 6-caps, 2-tries)
- William "Billy" Winstanley won caps for England while at Leigh in 1910 Wales, while at Wigan in 1911 Wales, Australia, in 1912 Wales, and won caps for Great Britain while at Leigh in 1910 Australia, New Zealand, while at Wigan in 1911–12 Australia (3 matches)
- Thomas "Tom" Woods won caps for Wales while at Wigan 1921…1923 4-caps
- Stuart Wright won caps for England while at Wigan in 1975 New Zealand, while at Widnes in 1977 Wales, in 1978 France, Wales, in 1979 Wales, France, in 1980 Wales, and won caps for Great Britain while at Widnes in 1977 France, New Zealand, Australia (2 matches), in 1978 Australia (3 matches)
