= 1928–29 Challenge Cup =

Rugby league competition

- Duration: 5 rounds
- Number of teams: 32
- Highest attendance: 41,500
- Winners: Wigan
- Runners-up: Dewsbury

The 1928–29 Challenge Cup was the 29th staging of rugby league's oldest knockout competition, the Challenge Cup.

The final was contested by Wigan and Dewsbury at Wembley Stadium in London. This was the first Challenge Cup final to be held at Wembley.

The final was played on Saturday 4 May 1929, where Wigan beat Dewsbury 13–2 in front of a crowd of 41,500.

== First round ==
Date	Team one	Score one	Team two	Score two
9 Feb	Bradford Northern	2	Halifax	5
9 Feb	Bramley	0	Oldham	16
9 Feb	Broughton Rangers	2	St Helens Recs	13
9 Feb	Castleford	31	Whitehaven Recs	7
9 Feb	Dewsbury	37	Cottingham	0
9 Feb	Huddersfield	21	Widnes	11
9 Feb	Hull FC	11	Wakefield Trinity	5
9 Feb	Hunslet	16	Hull Kingston Rovers	7
9 Feb	Lindley	2	St Helens	32
9 Feb	Rochdale Hornets	2	Barrow	6
9 Feb	Salford	5	Keighley	9
9 Feb	Swinton	5	Leigh	2
9 Feb	Warrington	8	Leeds	0
9 Feb	Wigan Highfield	45	Uno's Dabs	0
9 Feb	Wigan	25	Batley	0
9 Feb	York	0	Featherstone Rovers	10

== Second round ==
Date	Team one	Score one	Team two	Score two
23 Feb	Castleford	8	Huddersfield	0
23 Feb	Dewsbury	14	Swinton	7
23 Feb	Featherstone Rovers	0	St Helens Recs	13
23 Feb	Halifax	16	Barrow	0
23 Feb	St Helens	26	Keighley	5
23 Feb	Warrington	7	Oldham	0
23 Feb	Wigan	16	Hunslet	0
4 Mar	Wigan Highfield	17	Hull FC	5

== Quarterfinals ==
Date	Team one	Score one	Team two	Score two
9 Mar	Castleford	8	Wigan Highfield	0
9 Mar	Halifax	0	St Helens Recs	21
9 Mar	St Helens	2	Wigan	2
9 Mar	Warrington	4	Dewsbury	10
13 Mar	Wigan	25	St Helens	5

== Semifinals ==
Date	Team one	Score one	Team two	Score two
6 Apr	Dewsbury	9	Castleford	3
6 Apr	Wigan	7	St Helens Recs	7
10 Apr	St Helens Recs	12	Wigan	13

== Final ==
4 May 1929

Wigan	13 – 2	Dewsbury
Try: Abram, Brown, Kinnear; Goal: Sullivan (2)	Report	Goal: Davies

Wembley Stadium, London
Attendance: 41,500
Referee: Bob Robinson (Bradford)

FB	1	Jim Sullivan
RW	2	Johnny Ring
RC	3	Tommy Parker
LC	4	Roy Kinnear
LW	5	Lou Brown
SO	6	Arthur Binks
SH	7	Syd Abram
PR	8	Wilf Hodder
HK	9	Jack Bennett
PR	10	Tom Beetham
SR	11	Frank Stephens
SR	12	Len Mason
LF	13	John Sherrington

FB	1	Jack Davies
RW	2	Tommy Bailey
RC	3	Clifford Smith
LC	4	Herbert Hirst
LW	5	Henry Coates
SO	6	John Woolmore
SH	7	Jim Rudd
PR	8	James Hobson
HK	9	Percy Brown
PR	10	William Rhodes
SR	11	Harry Bland
SR	12	Joe Malkin
LF	13	Joe Lyman
