= 1918–19 Yorkshire Cup =

Rugby league competition

- Structure: Regional knockout championship
- Teams: 13
- Winners: Huddersfield
- Runners-up: Dewsbury

The 1918–19 Yorkshire Cup was the eleventh occasion on which the Yorkshire Cup competition had been held. This quickly arranged competition was won by the cup holder who would make it a hat trick of wins, taking up where they left off before the start of the World War. Huddersfield beat Dewsbury by the score of 14–8 in the final. The match was played at Headingley, Leeds, now in West Yorkshire. The attendance was 21,500 and receipts were £1,309.

The shortened 1918–19 (February–May) season began less than three months after the end of the hostilities and the armistice of Compiègne. The country was still suffering from the aftermath of the long and bitter struggle. The 1918–19 (January) Northern Rugby Football Union Wartime Emergency League season had been operating since September 1918. This was cancelled, and the programme started tailing off in January 1919. The only club to be "lost" to the Yorkshire League was Keighley who closed down for the duration of the War and did not recommence playing until the start of the 1919–20 season. This season saw an invitation to junior/amateur club Featherstone Rovers which, with the temporary loss of Keighley, resulted in the total entries remaining the same as in the previous competition held before the outbreak of the war at thirteen. This in turn resulted in three byes in the first round.

This was Huddersfield's sixth appearance in what would be seven appearances in eight consecutive finals between 1909 and 1919 (which included four successive victories and six in total), and who knows, but for the intervention of the First World War and suspension of the competition, it may have been more. It was also the third of the four consecutive wins.

== Background ==
The Rugby Football League's Yorkshire Cup competition was a knock-out competition between (mainly professional) rugby league clubs from the county of Yorkshire. The actual area was at times increased to encompass other teams from outside the county such as Newcastle, Mansfield, Coventry, and even London (in the form of Acton & Willesden. The competition always took place early in the season, in the Autumn, with the final taking place in (or just before) December (The only exception to this was when disruption of the fixture list was caused during, and immediately after, the two World Wars).

== Competition and results ==
=== Round 1 ===
Involved 5 matches (with three byes) and 13 clubs

Game No	Fixture date	Home team	Score	Away team	Venue	Ref
1	Sat 12 Apr 1919	Hull Kingston Rovers	18–0	Halifax	Craven Street (off Holderness Road)	
2	Sat 12 Apr 1919	Wakefield Trinity	18–9	Bradford Northern	Belle Vue	
3	Sat 26 Apr 1919	Hull	6–0	Leeds	Boulevard	
4	Sat 26 Apr 1919	Hunslet	5–16	Huddersfield	Parkside	
5	Sat 26 Apr 1919	York	0–2	Bramley (Note: Bramley entered the Yorkshire Cup competition in the inaugural year of 1905, and have competed in each tournament since, but this was the first cup match won by them.)	Clarence Street	
6		Batley	0	bye		
7		Dewsbury	0	bye		
8		Featherstone Rovers (Note: Featherstone Rovers were at the time a junior/amateur club. They eventually joined the League for season 1921–22)	0	bye		

=== Round 2 – quarterfinals ===
Involved 4 matches and 8 clubs

Game No	Fixture date	Home team	Score	Away team	Venue	Ref
1	Sat 3 May 1919	Dewsbury	7–2	Batley	Crown Flatt	
2	Sat 3 May 1919	Hull	31–4	Bramley	Boulevard	
3	Sat 3 May 1919	Hull Kingston Rovers	4–19	Huddersfield	Craven Street (off Holderness Road)	
4	Sat 3 May 1919	Wakefield Trinity	14–3	Featherstone Rovers	Belle Vue	

=== Round 3 – semifinals ===
Involved 2 matches and 4 clubs

Game No	Fixture date	Home team	Score	Away team	Venue	Ref
1	Sat 10 May 1919	Dewsbury	3–2	Wakefield Trinity	Crown Flatt	
2	Sat 10 May 1919	Huddersfield	23–13	Hull	Fartown	

=== Final ===
Game No	Fixture date	Home team	Score	Away team	Venue	Att	Rec	Ref
	Saturday 17 May 1919	Huddersfield	14–8	Dewsbury	Headingley (Note: Headingley, is the home ground of Leeds RLFC with a capacity of 21,000. The record attendance was 40,175 for a league match between Leeds and Bradford Northern on 21 May 1947.)	21500	1309	

==== Teams and scorers ====
Huddersfield	№	Dewsbury
	teams	
Major Holland	1	Billy Rhodes
George Todd	2	Joe Lyman
Tom Gleeson	3	Wilfred Mosby
Albert Rosenfeld	4	Thomas Price
Stan Moorhouse	5	George Sharples
Johnny Rogers	6	Robert Birch
Robert Habron	7	Ernest Rodgers
Douglas Clark	8	Percy Brown
Ben Gronow	9	Albert Dixon
John Higson	10	John Leake
Aaron Lee	11	Thomas Craven
Herbert Sherwood	12	Reynor Robertshaw
Arthur Swinden	13	Frank Gallagher
??	Coach	??
14	score	8
7	HT	0
	Scorers	
	Tries	
Tom Gleeson (1)	T	Joe Lyman (1)
Robert Habron (1)	T	G. Sharples (1)
	Goals	
Ben Gronow (4)	G	Joe Lyman (1)
	Drop Goals	
	DG	
Referee		F. Renton (Hunslet)

Scoring – Try = three (3) points – Goal = two (2) points – Drop goal = two (2) points

=== The road to success ===
First round
Hull Kingston Rovers	18
Halifax	0
Hunslet	5
Huddersfield	16
Hull	6
Leeds	0
York	0
Bramley	2
Dewsbury
bye
Batley
bye
Wakefield Trinity	18
Bradford Northern	9
Featherstone Rovers
bye

Second round
Hull Kingston Rovers	4
Huddersfield	19
Hull	31
Bramley	4
Dewsbury	7
Batley	2
Wakefield Trinity	14
Featherstone Rovers	3

Semifinals
Huddersfield	23
Hull	13
Dewsbury	3
Wakefield Trinity	2

Final
Huddersfield	14
Dewsbury	8

== See also ==
- 1918–19 Northern Rugby Football Union season
- Rugby league county cups
