= 1925–26 Yorkshire Cup =

- Structure: Regional knockout championship
- Teams: 15
- Winners: Dewsbury
- Runners-up: Huddersfield

The 1925–26 Yorkshire Cup was the eighteenth occasion on which the Yorkshire Cup competition was held.. This year again saw a new name added to the list of cup winners. This time it was Dewsbury winning the trophy by beating Huddersfield in the final 2–0. The match was played at Belle Vue, in the City of Wakefield, now in West Yorkshire. The attendance was 12,616 and receipts were £718. This was the last time for another fourteen years that a new name would be added.

== Background ==
The Rugby Football League's Yorkshire Cup competition was a knock-out competition between (mainly professional) rugby league clubs from the county of Yorkshire. The actual area was at times increased to encompass other teams from outside the county such as Newcastle, Mansfield, Coventry, and even London (in the form of Acton & Willesden.

The Rugby League season always (until the onset of "Summer Rugby" in 1996) ran from around August-time through to around May-time and this competition always took place early in the season, in the Autumn, with the final taking place in (or just before) December. The only exception to this was when disruption of the fixture list was caused during, and immediately after, the two World Wars.

== Competition and results ==
This season there was only one junior/amateur club taking part, Castleford, at the time still a junior club, but which would be joining the league in the next closed season. This resulted in a reduction in entrants of just one, giving a total of fifteen entrants. This in turn resulted in one bye in the first round.

=== Round 1 ===
Involved 7 matches (with one bye) and 15 clubs

Game No	Fixture date	Home team	Score	Away team	Venue	Ref
1	Sat 10 Oct 1925	Batley	4–6	Wakefield Trinity	Mount Pleasant	
2	Sat 10 Oct 1925	Bradford Northern	9–9	Castleford (Note: Castleford were at that time a junior club. They joined the league for season 1926–27)	Birch Lane	
3	Sat 10 Oct 1925	Dewsbury	22–7	Bramley	Crown Flatt	
4	Sat 10 Oct 1925	Halifax	0–2	Leeds	Thrum Hall	
5	Sat 10 Oct 1925	Hull	16–3	Hunslet	Boulevard	
6	Sat 10 Oct 1925	Hull Kingston Rovers	10–14	York	Craven Park (1)	
7	Sat 10 Oct 1925	Keighley	4–18	Featherstone Rovers	Lawkholme Lane	
8		Huddersfield		bye		

=== Round 1 - replays ===
Involved 1 match and 2 clubs

Game No	Fixture date	Home team	Score	Away team	Venue	Ref
R	Wed 14 Oct 1925	Castleford	5–11	Bradford Northern	Sandy Desert	

=== Round 2 – quarterfinals ===
Involved 4 matches and 8 clubs

Game No	Fixture date	Home team	Score	Away team	Venue	Ref
1	Tue 20 Oct 1925	Dewsbury	13–3	Hull	Crown Flatt	
2	Wed 21 Oct 1925	Bradford Northern	15–5	York	Birch Lane	
3	Wed 21 Oct 1925	Huddersfield	16–11	Leeds	Fartown	
4	Wed 21 Oct 1925	Wakefield Trinity	2–23	Featherstone Rovers	Belle Vue	

=== Round 3 – semifinals ===
Involved 2 matches and 4 clubs

Game No	Fixture date	Home team	Score	Away team	Venue	Ref
1	Wed 4 Nov 1925	Huddersfield	15–9	Featherstone Rovers	Fartown	
2	Wed 11 Nov 1925	Dewsbury	13–5	Bradford Northern	Crown Flatt	

=== Final ===
Game No	Fixture date	Home team	Score	Away team	Venue	Att	Rec	Ref
	Saturday 28 November 1925	Dewsbury	2–0	Huddersfield	Belle Vue (Note: Belle Vue is the home ground of Wakefield Trinity with a capacity of approximately 12,500. The record attendance was 37,906 on the 21 March 1936 in the Challenge Cup semi-final between Leeds and Huddersfield)	12,616	£718	

==== Teams and scorers ====
Dewsbury	No.	Huddersfield
	Teams	
John William Stocks	1	Syd Walmsley
Harold Raywood	2	Arthur Walker
Rhys Rees	3	Joe Oliver
Joe Lyman	4	Joseph McTighe
James Lyman	5	Fred Whiteley
Edward McLoughlin	6	Eddie Williams
Cliff Midgley	7	James May
Percy Brown	8	Arthur Sherwood
William Rhodes	9	Arthur Newton
Joseph Hobson	10	Thomas Fenwick
John Ryan	11	Douglas Clark
John Moore	12	Richard Cracknell
Edward Donnelly	13	Tommy Schofield
??	Coach	??
2	score	0
2	HT	0
	Scorers	
	Goals	
	G	
	Drop Goals	
	DG	
Referee		unknown

Scoring - Try = three (3) points - Goal = two (2) points - Drop goal = two (2) points

=== The road to success ===
First round
Dewsbury	22
Bramley	7
Hull	16
Hunslet	3
Bradford Northern	9 (11)
Castleford	9 (5)
Hull Kingston Rovers	10
York	14
Huddersfield
bye
Halifax	0
Leeds	2
Batley	4
Wakefield Trinity	6
Keighley	4
Featherstone Rovers	18

Second round
Dewsbury	13
Hull	3
Bradford Northern	15
York	5
Huddersfield	16
Leeds	11
Wakefield Trinity	2
Featherstone Rovers	23

Semifinals
Dewsbury	13
Bradford Northern	5
Huddersfield	15
Featherstone Rovers	9

Final
Dewsbury	2
Huddersfield	0

== See also ==
- 1925–26 Northern Rugby Football League season
- Rugby league county cups
