= Fred Kelsall =

England international rugby league footballer

Personal information
- Full name: Frederick Thomas Kelsall
- Born: 4 May 1906 Great Sankey, Warrington, England
- Died: 14 May 1931 (aged 25) Eccleston, St Helens, England

Playing information
- Weight: 14 st 8 lb (93 kg)
- Position: Prop
Club
Years	Team	Pld	T	G	FG	P
1925–30	Widnes	188	11	0	0	33
Representative
Years	Team	Pld	T	G	FG	P
1927–30	Lancashire	12	1	0	0	3
1930	England	1	0	0	0	0

Frederick Thomas Kelsall (4 May 1906 – 14 May 1931) was an English professional rugby league footballer who played in the 1920s and 1930s. He played at representative level for England and Lancashire, and at club level for Widnes, as a prop.

== Background ==
Kelsall was born in Great Sankey, Warrington, Lancashire, England, and he died aged 25 in Eccleston, St Helens, Lancashire, England.

Described as the heaviest and most skilled of the Widnes pack that won an unlikely victory at Wembley in 1930, Fred Kelsall died in a motorcycle accident (in which his pillion passenger Miss Minnie Salt and two persons on another motorcycle were also killed) in May 1931.

== Playing career ==
=== Club career ===
Kelsall played at prop in Widnes' 4-5 defeat by Wigan in the 1928–29 Lancashire Cup Final during the 1928–29 season at Wilderspool Stadium, Warrington on Saturday 24 November 1928.

Kelsall played prop in Widnes' 10-3 victory over St. Helens in the 1929–30 Challenge Cup Final during the 1929–30 season at Wembley Stadium, London on Saturday 3 May 1930 in front of a crowd of 36,544.

=== International honours ===
Kelsall won a cap for England while at Widnes in 1930 against Other Nationalities.
