= Jim Rudd (rugby league) =

English rugby league footballer

Personal information
- Full name: James Rudd
- Born: c. 1904 Oldham, England
- Died: 25 December 1997 (aged 93) Featherstone, England

Playing information
- Height: 5 ft 6 in (1.68 m)
- Weight: 10 st 8 lb (67 kg)
- Position: Scrum-half
Club
Years	Team	Pld	T	G	FG	P
1923–28	Featherstone Rovers	57	12	7	0	50
≤1929–30	Dewsbury
1930–31	Bradford Northern	15	0	0	1	2
	Total	72	12	7	1	52

James "Jim" Rudd was an English professional rugby league footballer who played in the 1920s. He played at club level for Featherstone Rovers, and Dewsbury, as an occasional goal-kicking scrum-half.

== Background ==
Rudd was born in Oldham, Lancashire, England.

== Playing career ==
=== Club career ===
Rudd made his début for Featherstone Rovers on Tuesday 25 December 1923.

On 4 May 1929, Rudd played scrum-half in Dewsbury's 2-13 defeat by Wigan in the 1929 Challenge Cup final, the inaugural final to place at Wembley Stadium, London, in front of a crowd of 41,000. He is believed to be the first player to touch the ball at Wembley in a rugby league game, although this is disputed.

In December 1930, he was signed by Bradford Northern.

== Death ==
Rudd died on Christmas Day 1997, aged 93. He was the last surviving player of the 1929 Challenge Cup final. At the request of his family, Rudd's ashes were scattered at Wembley.
