= Syd Abram =

English rugby league footballer

- Ogden's Cigarette card featuring Sydney Abram

Personal information
- Full name: Sydney Abram
- Born: 14 June 1906; Hindley, Wigan, England
- Died: 4 February 1988 (aged 81); Hindley, Wigan, England

Playing information
- Position: Centre, Stand-off, Scrum-half
Club
Years	Team	Pld	T	G	FG	P
1926–32	Wigan	171	48	1		147
≤1934–≥34	Bramley
	Total	171	48	1	0	147

Sydney Abram (14 June 1906 – 4 February 1988) was a professional rugby league footballer who played in the 1920s and 1930s. He played at club level for Wigan, and Bramley (captain), as a centre, stand-off, or scrum-half.

== Background ==
Syd Abram was born in Hindley, Wigan, Lancashire, England, and he died aged 81 in Hindley, Wigan, Greater Manchester, England.

== Playing career ==
=== Challenge Cup Final appearances ===
Syd Abram played either stand-off, or scrum-half, and scored a try (as this was the first rugby league match at Wembley Stadium, this was the first rugby league try at Wembley Stadium) in Wigan's 13-2 victory over Dewsbury in the 1929 Challenge Cup Final during the 1928–29 season at Wembley Stadium, London on Saturday 4 May 1929, in front of a crowd of 41,000.

=== County Cup Final appearances ===
Syd Abram played scrum-half in Wigan's 5-4 victory over Widnes in the 1928 Lancashire Cup Final during the 1928–29 season at Wilderspool Stadium, Warrington on Saturday 24 November 1928.

=== Playing career ===
Syd Abram made his début for Wigan, and scored a try in the 35-2 victory over Widnes at Lowerhouse Lane, Widnes on Saturday 23 October 1926, he scored his last try for Wigan in the 3-9 defeat by Widnes at Naughton Park, Widnes on Saturday 26 March 1932, and he played his last match for Wigan in the 5-23 defeat by Salford at Central Park, Wigan on Saturday 27 August 1932.
