= Tom Beetham =

English rugby league footballer

Personal information
- Born: Ambleside, England

Playing information

Rugby union
Club
Years	Team	Pld	T	G	FG	P
	Ambleside

Rugby league
- Position: Hooker
Club
Years	Team	Pld	T	G	FG	P
1924–31	Wigan	262	10	0		30
1931–32	Barrow	34
1933	Leigh	1
	Total	297	10	0	0	30
Representative
Years	Team	Pld	T	G	FG	P
1925–31	Cumberland	10	1	0	0	3

Tom Beetham was an English professional rugby league footballer who played as a hooker for Wigan between 1924 and 1931. He also played for Cumberland at representative level.

== Playing career ==
Born in Ambleside, Cumberland, Beetham started his career playing rugby union in his hometown before signing for Wigan in 1924. He made his début in September 1924 against York. He spent seven years at Wigan, playing 262 first team games for the club and scoring 10 tries before signing for Barrow in 1931.

=== Championship final appearances ===
Tom Beetham played at prop in Wigan's 22–10 victory over Warrington in the Championship Final during the 1925–26 season at Knowsley Road, St. Helens on Saturday 8 May 1926.

=== Challenge Cup Final appearances ===
Tom Beetham played at prop in Wigan's 13–2 victory over Dewsbury in the 1928–29 Challenge Cup Final at Wembley Stadium, London on Saturday 4 May 1929.

=== County Cup Final appearances ===
Tom Beetham played at prop in Wigan's 5–4 victory over Widnes in the 1928–29 Lancashire Cup Final during the 1928–29 season at Wilderspool Stadium, Warrington on Saturday 24 November 1928.

== Honours ==
=== Club ===
Wigan

Championship (1): 1925–26

Lancashire League (1): 1925–26

Lancashire Cup (1): 1928

Challenge Cup (1): 1929
