= Ernie Mills (rugby league) =

Australian rugby league player

Personal information
- Full name: Ernest Mills
- Born: 1904 Bigga, New South Wales, Australia
- Died: 1983 (aged 78–79)

Playing information
- Position: Wing
Club
Years	Team	Pld	T	G	FG	P
1927–35	Huddersfield	386	288			864
Representative
Years	Team	Pld	T	G	FG	P
1929–30	Other Nationalities	2	1			3

Ernie "Bigga" Mills (1904–1983) was an Australian rugby league footballer who played professionally in England as a wing for Huddersfield before a severe injury ended his playing career at only age 31.

== Early life ==
Mills was born in Bigga, New South Wales and after attending the local primary school went to high school in Goulburn before attending college in Sydney where he trained as a teacher. His rugby league career began with local teams in Bigga and Goulburn. After completing his college course, Mills took a teaching post in Grenfell, New South Wales where he played for the local rugby team.

== Professional rugby career ==
At various times during the early decades of the 20th century there was a ban on British rugby league teams signing players from outside the United Kingdom. The most recent ban dated from 1923 and existed because of fears from the Australian league authorities that the best players would be attracted to play in Britain rather than stay at home and develop the game at home. By 1927 the British clubs wanted the ban lifting and in June 1927 the ban was lifted. The Grenfell team were at this time coached by Huddersfield player, Ben Gronow. Gronow recommended Mills to Huddersfield and with days of the transfer ban being lifted Mills had signed a contract with Huddersfield and arrived in England in time for the start of the 1927–28 season.

Mills scored his first try for Huddersfield on his debut, scoring the only points of the game, a 3–0 victory over Castleford on 27 August 1927.

For the 1927–28 season and the following five seasons Mills was to be Huddersfield's top try scorer and for two seasons, 1928–29 and 1931–32 he was the league's top try scorer.

Mills played and won in two Championship finals, 1928–29 (2–0 vs Leeds), and 1929–30 (10–0 in a replay against Leeds after a 2–2 draw). Huddersfield won the Yorkshire League in the same two seasons.

In 1931 Mills won a Yorkshire Cup winners medal as Huddersfield beat Hunslet 4–2 in the 1931–32 Yorkshire Cup final at Headingley.

The quartet of winning all four different cups was completed in 1933 as Mills was a member of the team that triumphed in the 1932–33 Challenge Cup final and he scored a try as Huddersfield beat Warrington 21–17 at Wembley on 6 May 1933.

During the 1934–35 season Mills requested a transfer from Huddersfield and was placed on the transfer list with a fee of £600, but before any transfer was agreed Mills was injured playing against Bradford Northern in April 1935. Mills did not play for the rest of the season and despite surgery, the injury was so severe that Mills was advised to retire from playing at the end of 1935.

In total Mills made 386 appearances for Huddersfield, scoring 288 tries, and in a sport where injuries were common played 123 consecutive games between 28 December 1929 and 5 September 1932.

Mills was never considered for selection for the Australian national team and the only representative honours he achieved were to play twice for the Other Nationalities against England in 1929 and 1930, his only international try being scored in the 1930 game.

== Teaching career ==
Mills held several teaching posts in England both while playing rugby and after his retirement from the game. During the Great Depression of the early 1930s, he was in charge of the youth section of a training centre for unemployed young people in Huddersfield.

== Personal life ==
Mills was married three times. The first marriage was to Edna Naylor in July 1926 in Sydney. In 1931, she petitioned for divorce on the basis of Mills's desertion of her by his move to England to play rugby. They had one child. In August 1932 Mills married Marie Johnson in England. By 1951 Mills and Johnson has divorced and Mills married for a third time to Vera Shaw in Lancaster, Lancashire, England. Mills and Shaw and his children by Johnson and Shaw returned to Australia in 1953. He continued to teach until retirement and died in 1983.
