= 1928–29 Lancashire Cup =

- Structure: Regional knockout competition
- Teams: 13
- Winners: Wigan
- Runners-up: Widnes

The 1928–29 Lancashire Cup was the 21st running of this regional rugby league competition. Wigan took the trophy for the 6th time, by beating Widnes by 5–4 in the final played at Wilderspool, Warrington. The attendance was 19,000 and receipts £1,150.

== Background ==
The number of teams entering this year's competition remained at 13 which resulted in 3 byes in the first round.

== Competition and results ==
=== Round 1 ===
Involved 5 matches (with three byes) and 13 clubs

Game No	Fixture date	Home team	Score	Away team	Venue	Att	Rec	Notes	Ref
1	Sat 13 October 1928	Broughton Rangers	10–15	St. Helens	The Cliff				
2	Sat 13 October 1928	St Helens Recs	7–7	Warrington	Knowsley Road			1	
3	Sat 13 October 1928	Swinton	7–3	Leigh	Chorley Road ground				
4	Sat 13 October 1928	Widnes	4–0	Wigan Highfield	Lowerhouse Lane				
5	Sat 13 October 1928	Wigan	37–13	Barrow	Central Park				
6		Rochdale Hornets		bye					
7		Oldham		bye					
8		Salford		bye					
Replay
9	Wed 17 October 1928	Warrington	10–2	St Helens Recs	Wilderspool			2	

=== Round 2 – quarterfinals ===
Game No	Fixture date	Home team	Score	Away team	Venue	Att	Rec	Notes	Ref
1	Mon 22 October 1928	Rochdale Hornets	2–15	Widnes	Athletic Grounds				
2	Wed 24 October 1928	Oldham	12–2	Salford	Watersheddings				
3	Wed 24 October 1928	Swinton	3–21	Wigan	Chorley Road ground				
4	Wed 24 October 1928	Warrington	14–11	St. Helens	Wilderspool				

=== Round 3 – semifinals ===
Game No	Fixture date	Home team	Score	Away team	Venue	Att	Rec	Notes	Ref
1	Mon 5 November 1928	Oldham	5–5	Wigan	Watersheddings				
2	Thu 8 November 1928	Widnes	25–5	Warrington	Lowerhouse Lane				
Replay
1	Wed 7 November 1928	Wigan	21–0	Oldham	Central Park				

=== Final ===
Game No	Fixture date	Home team	Score	Away team	Venue	Att	Rec	Notes	Ref
	Saturday 24 November 1928	Wigan	5–4	Widnes	Wilderspool	19000	£1,150	3	

==== Teams and scorers ====
Wigan	No.	Widnes
	teams	
Jim Sullivan	1	Bob Fraser
Lou Brown	2	Jack Dennett
Roy Kinnear	3	Peter Topping
Tommy Parker	4	Alec Higgins
Johnny Ring	5	Joe Stanley
Arthur Binks	6	Paddy Douglas
Syd Abram	7	Jerry Laughton (probably Captain)
Tom Beetham	8	Frederick Kelsall
Jack Bennett	9	George Stevens
Wilf Hodder	10	Nat Silcock
Len Mason	11	Jack Higgins
Frank Stephens	12	Jack Gregory
John Sherrington	13	Jimmy Hoey
5	score	4
0	HT	0
	Scorers	
	Tries	
Lou Brown (1)	T	nil
	Goals	
Jim Sullivan (1)	G	Jimmy Hoey (1)
	Drop Goals	
nil	DG	Paddy Douglas (1)
Referee		

Scoring – Try = three (3) points – Goal = two (2) points – Drop goal = two (2) points

=== The road to success ===
First round
Oldham
bye
Salford
bye
Swinton	7
Leigh	3
Wigan	37
Barrow	13
Rochdale Hornets
bye
Widnes	4
Wigan Highfield	0
St Helens Recs	7(2)
Warrington	7(10)
Broughton Rangers	10
St. Helens	15

Second round
Oldham	12
Salford	2
Swinton	3
Wigan	21
Rochdale Hornets	2
Widnes	15
Warrington	14
St. Helens	11

Semifinals
Oldham	5(0)
Wigan	5(21)
Widnes	25
Warrington	5

Final
Wigan	5
Widnes	4

== See also ==
- 1928–29 Northern Rugby Football League season

== Notes ==
- 1 This match was transferred to the neighbouring St Helens stadium due to the better facilities offered
- 2 The official Warrington archives give the score for the replayed match as 13–3 – the details given by "RUGBY LEAGUE projects" show the score as 10–2
- 3 Watersheddings was the home ground of Oldham RLFC from 1889 to 1997
