= Frank Stephens (rugby) =

Wales international rugby league and union footballer

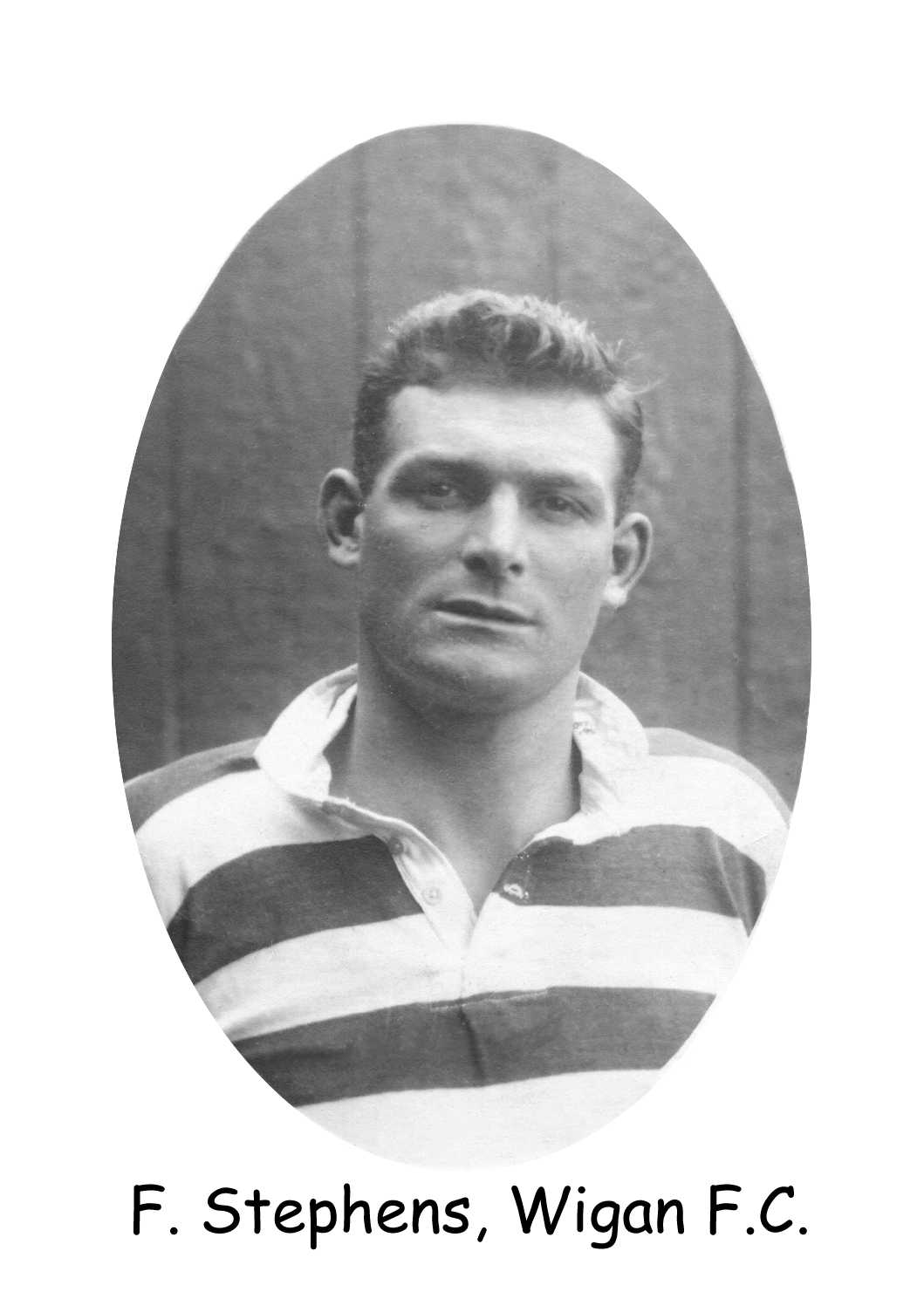

Personal information
- Full name: Frank Stephens
- Born: 23 March 1899 Drybrook, Gloucestershire, England
- Died: 11 March 1971 (aged 71) Wigan, England

Playing information

Rugby union
Club
| Years | Team | Pld | T | G | FG | P |
|---|---|---|---|---|---|---|
| 1921–23 | Bargoed RFC |
| 1923–25 | Cardiff RFC |
| | Total | 0 | 0 | 0 | 0 | 0 |
Representative
| Years | Team | Pld | T | G | FG | P |
| 1922–25 | Crawshays RFC |

Rugby league
- Position: Prop, Second-row
Club
| Years | Team | Pld | T | G | FG | P |
|---|---|---|---|---|---|---|
| 1925–30 | Wigan | 205 | 7 | | | 21 |
| 1930–31 | Batley | 34 |
| 1931–32 | Rochdale Hornets | 13 |
| | Total | 252 | 7 | 0 | 0 | 21 |
Representative
| Years | Team | Pld | T | G | FG | P |
| 1929 | Other Nationalities | 1 |
| 1926–30 | Wales | 4 |

Frank Stephens (23 March 1899 – 11 March 1971) was an English-born Welsh rugby union and professional rugby league footballer who played in the 1920s and 1930s. He played invitational level rugby union (RU) for Crawshays RFC, and at club level for Bargoed RFC and Cardiff RFC, and representative level rugby league (RL) for Wales and Other Nationalities, and at club level for Wigan, Batley and Rochdale Hornets, as a prop or second-row. Frank Stephens played for Wigan against Dewsbury in the first rugby league Challenge Cup Final to be held at Wembley Stadium, London in 1929.

== Biography ==
Frank Stephens was born in Drybrook, Gloucestershire but brought up in Blackwood, Monmouthshire. Prior to his Wigan rugby league career he had played rugby union for Bargoed, and subsequently joined Cardiff RFC in 1923. During this period he also played for Captain Crawshay's Welsh XV select tours from 1922 to 1925. His rugby league career started when invited to sign for Wigan RFC in 1925.

== Playing career ==
=== International honours ===
Frank Stephens won a cap for Other Nationalities (RL) while at Wigan in the 20–27 defeat by England at Headingley, Leeds on Wednesday 20 March 1929, and won caps for Wales (RL) while at Wigan in the 34–8 victory over New Zealand at Taff Vale Park, Pontypridd on Saturday 4 December 1926, the 12–20 defeat by England at Central Park, Wigan on Wednesday 11 January 1928, the 15–39 defeat by England at White City Stadium, Sloper Road, Grangetown, Cardiff on Wednesday 14 November 1928, and the 10–26 defeat by Australia at Wembley Stadium, London on Saturday 18 January 1930.

=== County honours ===
Frank Stephens played hooker in Monmouthshire's 14–18 defeat by Glamorgan in the non-County Championship match during the 1926–27 season at Taff Vale Park, Pontypridd on Saturday 30 April 1927, and represented Glamorgan and Monmouthshire (RL) while at Wigan against Lancashire at Taff Vale Park, Pontypridd on Saturday 12 November 1927, against Cumberland at Recreation Ground?, Whitehaven on Saturday 20 October 1928, against Cumberland at Welsh White City Stadium, Sloper Road, Grangetown, Cardiff on Saturday 21 December 1929, and against Yorkshire at Parkside, Hunslet on Thursday 27 February 1930.

=== Championship final appearances ===
Frank Stephens played at second-row in Wigan's 22–10 victory over Warrington in the Championship Final during the 1925–26 season at Knowsley Road, St. Helens on Saturday 8 May 1926.

=== County League appearances ===
Frank Stephens played in Wigan's victory in the Lancashire League during the 1925–26 season.

=== Challenge Cup Final appearances ===
Frank Stephens played at second-row in Wigan's 13–2 victory over Dewsbury in the 1928–29 Challenge Cup Final during the 1928–29 season at Wembley Stadium, London on Saturday 4 May 1929.

=== County Cup Final appearances ===
Frank Stephens played at second-row in Wigan's 11–15 defeat by Swinton in the 1925–26 Lancashire Cup Final during the 1925–26 season at The Cliff, Broughton on Wednesday 9 December 1925, and played at second-row in the 5–4 victory over Widnes in the 1928–29 Lancashire Cup Final during the 1928–29 season at The Willows, Salford on Saturday 24 November 1928,

== Genealogical information ==
Frank Stephens' marriage to Edna (née Morris) was registered during first ¼ 1928 in Wigan district. They had children; Enid L. Stephens (birth registered during second ¼ 1928 in Wigan district), Ronald A. Stephens (birth registered during third ¼ 1929 in Wigan district), and Marjorie Stephens (birth registered during first ¼ 1932 in Wigan district).
