= Len Mason =

NZ international rugby league footballer

Personal information
- Full name: Leonard Tasman Mason
- Born: 23 September 1903; Huntly, New Zealand
- Died: 10 June 1953 (aged 49); Hamilton, New Zealand

Playing information
- Height: 1.83 m (6 ft 0 in)
- Weight: 15 st 0 lb (95 kg)
- Position: Centre, Prop, Hooker, Second-row
Club
Years	Team	Pld	T	G	FG	P
	Unknown (WRL)
1924–25	Athletic (ARL)	20	8	2	0	28
1926–27	Hornby (CRL)	18	10	4	0	38
1927–35	Wigan	362	50	5	0	160
1936–37	Keighley	36	4	0	0	12
1937–39	Bramley	64	1	0	0	3
1939–40	Keighley	10	1	0	0	3
	Total	510	74	11	0	244
Representative
Years	Team	Pld	T	G	FG	P
	South Auckland
1924–25	Auckland B	3	0	2	0	4
1925	Auckland	1	0	0	0	0
1926	Canterbury	2	0	0	0	0
1926	South Island	1	1	0	0	3
1929–33	Other Nationalities	4	1	0	0	3
1926–27	New Zealand	27 (3)	9 (0)	3 (0)	0 (0)	33 (0)

Leonard Tasman Mason (23 September 1903 – 10 June 1953) was a New Zealand professional rugby league footballer who played in the 1920s and 1930s. He played at representative level for New Zealand, Other Nationalities, Dominion XIII, the South Island, South Auckland and Canterbury, and at club level for Wigan, Keighley and Bramley, as a centre, prop, hooker, or second-row.

== Early life and family ==
Born in Huntly on 23 September 1903, Mason was the son of Victor Emanuel Mason and Te Ngaehe Elizabeth Mason (née Maki).

== Playing career ==
=== Waikato ===
Mason represented South Auckland as a teenager.

=== Auckland ===
He then moved to Auckland where he joined the Athletic club (formerly Maritime) for 2 seasons. He played for Auckland B on their Southern Tour in 1925 and then played one match for Auckland against Canterbury.

=== Canterbury ===
Work then took him to Christchurch where he joined the Hornby club in the Canterbury Rugby League competition. He played for them in 1926 and 1927, representing the South Island team in 1926, where he scored a try in a 22-31 loss. Subsequently Mason was selected for the New Zealand national rugby league team and was part of the 1926-27 tour of Great Britain that was marred by player discontent.

Following the New Zealand tour of England Mason returned to Canterbury where he played a further 8 matches for Hornby before receiving an offer from Wigan to join them. He accepted and left for England in June.

=== New Zealand ===
Mason's first match for New Zealand was against Auckland prior to the 1926/27 season. He scored a try in a high scoring 32-52 loss where it seemed as though the New Zealand team was more worried about not sustaining injury than winning the match.

On the England tour Mason played 26 matches, including 3 tests from the 32 tour matches. The large number of games that he played was partly due to the fact that 7 players went on strike and 6 of these were fellow forwards.

=== Wigan ===
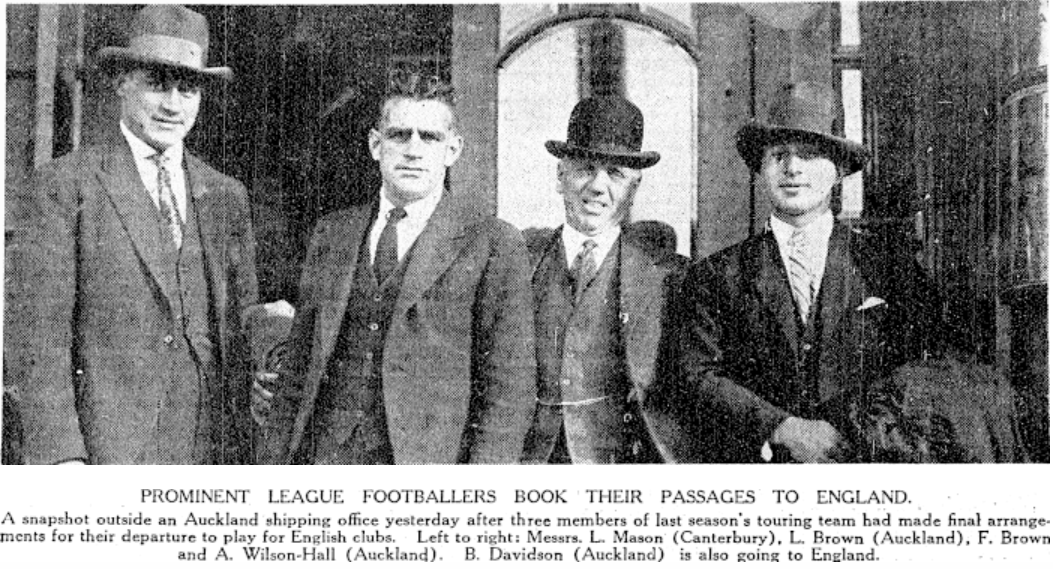

Mason moved to England in June 1927 to join Wigan.

During the 1928–29 season, Mason was part of Wigan's 1928–29 Lancashire Cup, playing at second-row in a 5-4 victory over Widnes in the final at Wilderspool Stadium, Warrington on Saturday 24 November 1928. He played at second-row in Wigan's 13-2 victory over Dewsbury in the Challenge Cup Final at Wembley Stadium, London on Saturday 4 May 1929.

He won caps for Other Nationalities while at Wigan. He played in the 20-27 defeat by England at Headingley Rugby Stadium, Leeds on Wednesday 20 March 1929, and in the 35-19 victory over England at Thrum Hall, Halifax on Monday 7 April 1930, and in the 18-31 defeat by England at Knowsley Road on Monday 7 April 1930, and in the 27-34 defeat by England in Workington on Thursday 30 March 1933.

Mason played at centre in Wigan's 15-3 victory over Salford in the Championship final during the 1933–34 season at Wilderspool Stadium, Warrington on Saturday 28 April 1934.

Mason played at second-row in Wigan's 30-27 victory over France at Central Park, Wigan, on Saturday 10 March 1934.

=== Keighley ===
Mason later joined Keighley and was still a first grade footballer at 39 years of age.

== Later years ==
Mason returned to the Waikato and was a Waikato selector in the later 1940s. He died in Hamilton in 1953, and was buried at Rangiriri Lawn Cemetery.
