= William Morgan (rugby league) =

Rugby league player

Personal information
- Full name: William Morgan

Playing information
- Position: Forward
Club
Years	Team	Pld	T	G	FG	P
1910–11	Warrington	26	0	0	0	0
- As of 13 December 2016

William Morgan was a professional rugby league footballer who played in the 1910s. He played at club level for Warrington, as a forward.

== Playing career ==
=== Club career ===
William Morgan made his début for Warrington on 3 September 1910 and he played his last match for Warrington on 4 March 1911.
