= Jack Davies (rugby) =

Wales dual-code international rugby footballer

Jack A. Davies
Personal information
- Full name: Eifion A. Davies
- Born: unknown Penclawdd, Swansea, Wales

Playing information

Rugby union
- Position: Centre
Club
Years	Team	Pld	T	G	FG	P
	London Welsh RFC
	Richmond F.C.
	Harlequin F.C.
	Total	0	0	0	0	0
Representative
Years	Team	Pld	T	G	FG	P
	Middlesex	≥1
	Wales XV	≥1

Rugby league
- Position: Centre, Stand-off
Club
Years	Team	Pld	T	G	FG	P
1947–55	Salford	241	49	469		1085
Representative
Years	Team	Pld	T	G	FG	P
1949	Wales	2

Eifion "Jack" A. Davies (birth year unknown) is a Welsh former rugby union and professional rugby league footballer who played in the 1940s and 1950s. He played representative level rugby union (RU) for Wales XV and Middlesex, and at club level for London Welsh RFC, Richmond F.C. and Harlequin F.C., as a centre, and representative level rugby league (RL) for Wales, and at club level for Salford, as a goal-kicking centre or stand-off.

== Background ==
Jack Davies was born in Penclawdd, Swansea, Wales.

== Playing career ==
=== International honours ===
Jack Davies represented Wales XV (RU) while at Harlequin F.C. against England in the 'Victory International' non-Test match(es) between December 1945 and April 1946, and he won caps for Wales (RL) while at Salford 1949 2-caps.

=== County honours ===
Jack Davies represented Middlesex (RU).

=== Club career ===
Jack Davies made his début for Salford against Keighley at The Willows, Salford on Saturday 1 November 1947.

=== Career Records ===
Jack Davies is one of fewer than twenty-five Welshmen to have scored more than 1000-points in their rugby league career.
