= Lou Houghton =

England international rugby league footballer

Personal information
- Full name: Louis Houghton
- Born: 25 January 1903

Playing information
- Position: Prop, Second-row
Club
Years	Team	Pld	T	G	FG	P
1924–30	St. Helens	233	17	0	0	51
1931–33	Wigan	96	5	0	0	15
	Keighley
	Total	329	22	0	0	66
Representative
Years	Team	Pld	T	G	FG	P
1927–30	Lancashire	3	0	0	0	0
1927–31	England	2	0	0	0	0

Louis Houghton was an English professional rugby league footballer who played in the 1920s and 1930s. He played at representative level for England, and at club level for St. Helens and Wigan, as a prop or second-row.

== Playing career ==
=== Club career ===
Houghton played at prop, and scored a try in St. Helens' 3–10 defeat by Widnes in the 1929–30 Challenge Cup Final at Wembley Stadium, London on Saturday 3 May 1930, in front of a crowd of 36,544.

Houghton played at prop in St. Helens' 10-2 victory over St Helens Recs in the 1926 Lancashire Cup Final during the 1926–27 season at Wilderspool Stadium, Warrington on Saturday 20 November 1926.

Houghton transferred from Wigan to Keighley in 1934.

=== International honours ===
Houghton won caps for England while at St. Helens in 1927 against Wales, and while at Wigan in 1931 against Wales.
