= Lou Brown (rugby league) =

NZ rugby league footballer (1905-1947)

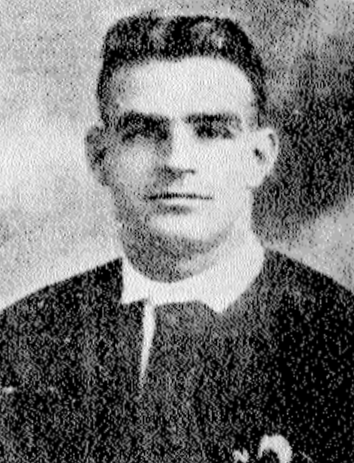

Personal information
- Full name: Louie Ernest Brown
- Born: 20 May 1905 Auckland, New Zealand
- Died: 3 June 1947 (aged 42) Auckland, New Zealand

Playing information
- Height: 173 cm (5 ft 8 in)
- Weight: 66 kg (10 st 6 lb)

Rugby union
Club
Years	Team	Pld	T	G	FG	P
1920–21	Te Kowhai
1921–22	Frankton
	Total	0	0	0	0	0

Rugby league
- Position: Wing, Centre
Club
Years	Team	Pld	T	G	FG	P
1922–23	Newton Rangers	26	12	2	1	42
1922–23	Wigan Reserves
1924–27	City Rovers	27	42	1	0	128
1927–30	Wigan	130	106	0	0	318
1930–31	Halifax	43	33	0	0	99
1931–34	York	116	77	1	0	233
1935–36	City Rovers	34	26	0	0	78
1937–38	Bordeaux
	Total	376	296	4	1	898
Representative
Years	Team	Pld	T	G	FG	P
1922–36	Auckland	14	18	0	0	54
1925–36	North Island	3	4	0	0	12
1925–36	New Zealand	41 (9)	22 (4)	0	0	66 (12)
1927–30	Other Nationalities	2	5	0	0	15
1935–36	Auckland Māori	5	4	0	0	12

Coaching information
Club
Years	Team	Gms	W	D	L	W%
1935	City Rovers	18	5	0	13	28
Representative
Years	Team	Gms	W	D	L	W%
1935	Auckland Juniors	1	1	0	0	100

Louie Ernest Brown (20 May 1905 – 3 June 1947) was a New Zealand professional rugby league footballer who played in the 1920s and 1930s. He played at representative level for New Zealand, Other Nationalities and Auckland, as a wing or centre.

== Personal life ==
Lou Brown was the son of Frank Brown, and Emma Catherine Brown, and the nephew of the "Harrison brothers, well known in the early days of football in this [Auckland] province". He had a twin brother Roy Ernest Brown, who went by his middle name (Ernest). He attended the Vermont Street Marist Brothers School in Auckland in the 1910s.

== Playing career ==
He played rugby union whilst at school and once scored 4 tries in a seven-a-side final against Point Chevalier whilst playing halfback, and in 1919 scored against Ponsonby. Brown began his 'adult' career playing rugby for Te Kowhai in the Waikato after moving there from Auckland though was still only in his mid teens, and in 1921 he transferred to the Frankton rugby club. He was renowned for his pace which he had from an early age. At the Ngaruawahia Annual Athletic Championships in early 1922 he placed first in the 100 yard, and 220 yard races, and second in the 40 yard race.

In 1922 he returned to Auckland early in the season to play in the Auckland Rugby League competition for the Newton Rangers. He made his Auckland début against New South Wales in the same season as a seventeen-year-old. After the 1923 season, Brown went to England and played for Wigan as an amateur in several reserve games. On his return, Brown joined City. Newton appealed, which was upheld by both the Auckland Rugby League, and the New Zealand Rugby League. As a result, he was suspended but after a protracted struggle was eventually released by Newton to play for City. He was joined in the senior side in the same season by his brother Roy (Ernest) Brown who played at fullback with Lou usually on the wing.

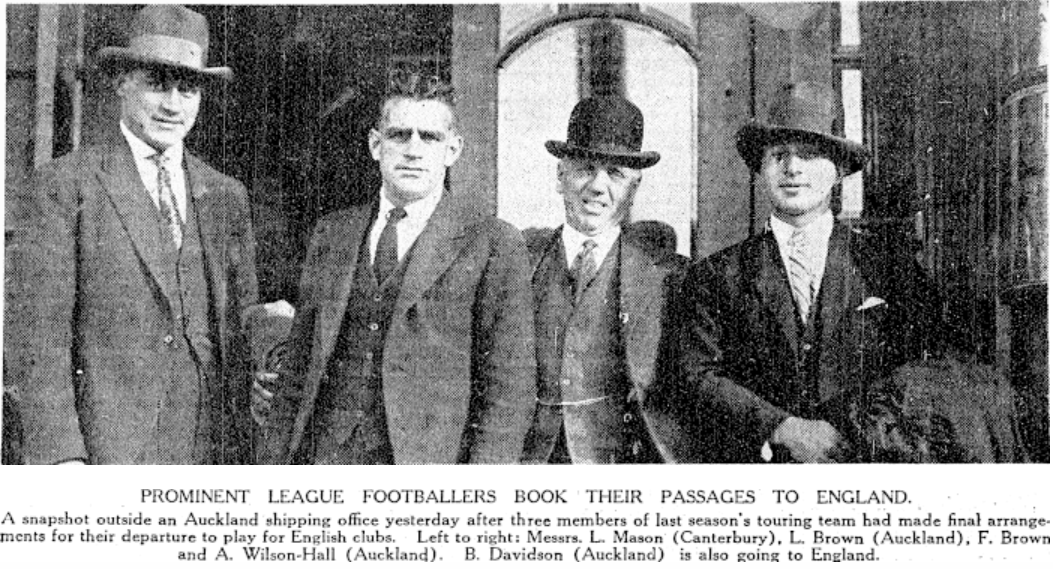

In 1927 he returned to England, joining Wigan as a professional.

Brown also played for Halifax and York. In May 1934 Brown suffered a severe throat cut and was hospitalised in a serious condition. He had written letters intimating that he was keen to return to New Zealand and this injury came as a shock. The York League Football Club were unaware of his desire to return to New Zealand and said that they were happy to allow him to return to New Zealand on a "vacational visit". He did indeed return to Auckland in time to represent New Zealand in 1935. He also had further stints in France, with Bordeaux and Bramley before suffering the illness that caused his death in 1947.

=== Representative career ===
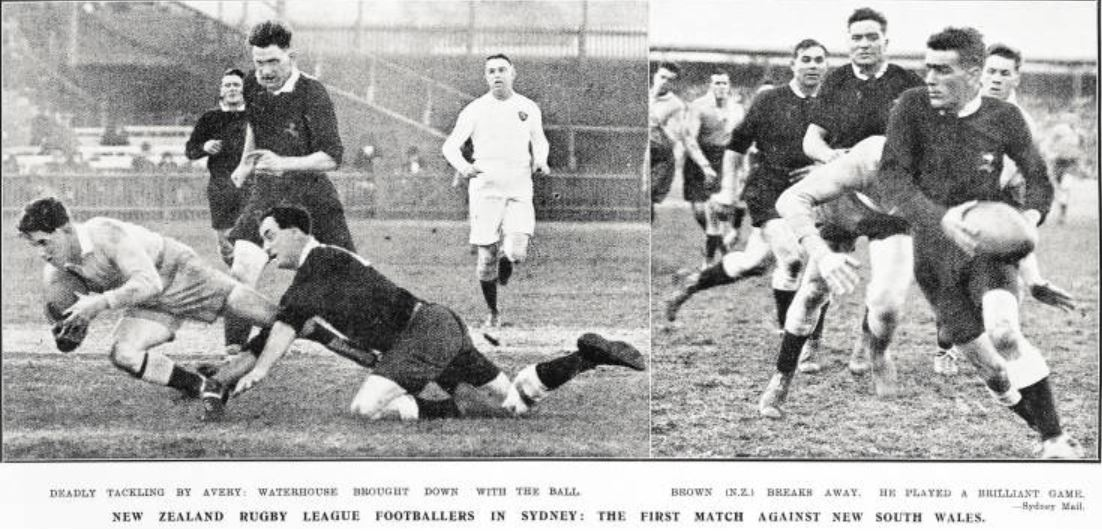
Brown with the ball on July 11 against NSW at the SCG.

Brown debuted for New Zealand on their 1925 tour of Australia where he played in 9 matches and scored 4 tries. Brown won caps for New Zealand in 1926 against England (2 matches) and Wales, in 1927 against England, in 1935 against Australia (3 matches), and in 1936 against England (2 matches), and won cap(s) for Other Nationalities while at Wigan against England. Brown was part of the 1926-27 tour of Great Britain that was marred by player discontent.

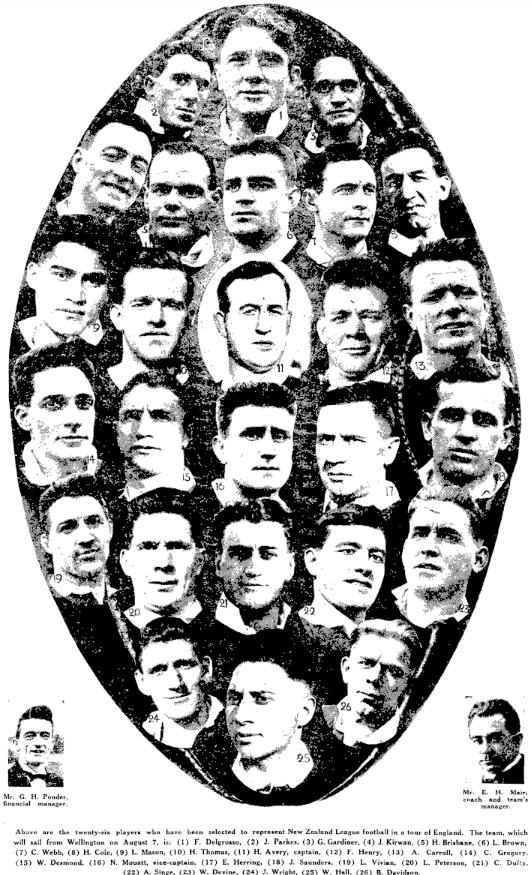
The NZ team to tour England and Wales with Lou Brown, second row from top in the centre (6).

He captained the Kiwis in one test match against Australia in 1935. In the same season he also made 2 appearances for the Auckland Māori team which was in its second ever season. He scored 4 tries in their wins over Takahiwai from Northland, and Hawke's Bay Māori.

=== Challenge Cup Final appearances ===
Brown played on the wing and scored a try in Wigan's 13–2 victory over Dewsbury in the 1928-29 Challenge Cup Final at Wembley Stadium, London on Saturday 4 May 1929.

=== County Cup Final appearances ===
Brown played on the wing and scored a try in Wigan's 5–4 victory over Widnes in the 1928 Lancashire Cup Final during the 1928–29 season at Wilderspool Stadium, Warrington on Saturday 24 November 1928.

== Death ==
Brown died in Auckland on 3 June 1947 and was buried at Waikaraka Cemetery. In an obituary in the Gisborne Herald it was written that "one of the finest wing three-quarters New Zealand has produced, Lou Brown, has died in Auckland". And that "Brown was rated as the finest wing three-quarter in England in 1929 when he scored a record tally of 43 tries in the season. The Otago Daily Times also mentioned that he had in fact played rugby league for the French international side saying "when the game was introduced into France, he went across the channel as a coach, and had the distinction, unique, surely in sporting annals, of playing for that country. One of Lou Brown's most prized possessions was a medal which was presented to him by the French Rugby League commemorating his inclusion in the team"
