= Brian Gregory (rugby league) =

Wales international rugby league footballer

Personal information
- Full name: Brian Gregory
- Born: c. 1949 unknown
- Died: January 2002 (aged 53) Tenerife, Spain

Playing information
- Height: 6 ft 2 in (1.88 m)
- Weight: 15 st 2 lb (96 kg)
- Position: Second-row, Loose forward
Club
| Years | Team | Pld | T | G | FG | P |
|---|---|---|---|---|---|---|
| ≤1969–69 | Salford |
| 1969–73 | Warrington | 128 | 23 | 0 | 0 | 69 |
| 1973–74 | Oldham | 29 | 5 | 0 | 0 | 15 |
| 1974–76 | Wigan | 60 | 13 | 0 | 0 | 39 |
| 1979–79 | Wakefield Trinity | 18 | 1 | 0 | 0 | 3 |
| | Total | 235 | 42 | 0 | 0 | 126 |
Representative
| Years | Team | Pld | T | G | FG | P |
| | Lancashire | ≥2 |
| 1975 | Wales | 3 | 1 | 0 | 0 | 3 |

Brian Gregory (c. 1949 – January 2002) was a professional rugby league footballer who played in the 1960s and 1970s. He played at representative level for Wales and Lancashire, and at club level for Salford, Warrington, Oldham, Wigan and Wakefield Trinity, as a second-row, or loose forward.

== Background ==
Brian Gregory died aged 53 in Tenerife, Spain.

== Playing career ==
=== International honours ===
Brian Gregory won caps for Wales while at Wigan in the 1975 Rugby League World Cup against England, New Zealand, and France.

=== County honours ===
Brian Gregory won 2-caps for Lancashire while at Warrington.

=== Club career ===
Gregory started his career with Salford before moving to Warrington where he won 2-caps for Lancashire. In November 1973, he joined Oldham for a transfer fee of £7,500, where he scored five tries in 29 appearances for the club. A year later, Gregory was a signed by Wigan for a fee of £9,500, (based on increases in average earnings, this would be approximately £134,500 in 2015).
