= Jack Bennett (rugby league) =

GB & England international rugby league footballer

John Bennett
Personal information
- Full name: John Bennett
- Born: unknown
- Died: unknown

Playing information
- Position: Hooker
Club
Years	Team	Pld	T	G	FG	P
1919–25	Rochdale Hornets	229
1925–31	Wigan	210	5	0	0	15
1931	Rochdale Hornets	7
	Total	446	5	0	0	15
Representative
Years	Team	Pld	T	G	FG	P
1922–27	Lancashire	8	0	0	0	0
1924–26	England	4	0	0	0	0
1924–26	Great Britain	7	0	0	0	0

John "Jack" Bennett (birth unknown – death unknown) was an English professional rugby league footballer who played in the 1920s and 1930s. He played at representative level for Great Britain and England, and at club level for Rochdale Hornets (two spells), and Wigan, as a hooker.

== Playing career ==
=== Rochdale Hornets ===
Jack Bennett played hooker in Rochdale Hornets' 10–9 victory over Hull F.C. in the 1921–22 Challenge Cup Final during the 1921–22 season at Headingley, Leeds on Saturday 6 May 1922, in front of a crowd of 32,596.

=== Wigan ===
Jack Bennett played hooker in Wigan's 11–15 defeat by Swinton in the 1925–26 Lancashire Cup Final during the 1925–26 season at The Cliff, Broughton on Wednesday 9 December 1925, and played hooker in the 5–4 victory over Widnes in the 1928–29 Lancashire Cup Final during the 1928–29 season at The Willows, Salford on Saturday 24 November 1928,

Jack Bennett played hooker in Wigan's 22–10 victory over Warrington in the Championship Final during the 1925–26 season at Knowsley Road, St. Helens on Saturday 8 May 1926.

Jack Bennett played in Wigan's victory in the Lancashire League during the 1925–26 season.

He played hooker in Wigan's 13–2 victory over Dewsbury in the 1928–29 Final during the 1928–29 season at Wembley Stadium, London on Saturday 4 May 1929.

=== International honours ===
Jack Bennett won caps for England while at Rochdale Hornets in 1924 against Other Nationalities, in 1925 against Wales, while at Wigan in 1926 against Wales, Other Nationalities, and won caps for Great Britain while at Rochdale Hornets in 1924 against Australia (3 matches), New Zealand (3 matches), and while at Wigan in 1926 against New Zealand.
