= Percy Brown (rugby league) =

English rugby league footballer

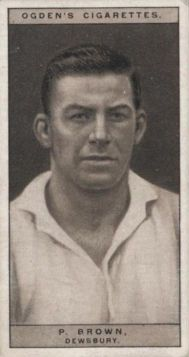
- Ogden's Cigarette card featuring Percy Brown

Personal information
- Full name: Percy Brown
- Born: unknown Normanton, England
- Died: unknown

Playing information
- Position: Forward, Hooker
Club
Years	Team	Pld	T	G	FG	P
1914–≥29	Dewsbury
Representative
Years	Team	Pld	T	G	FG	P
1920–25	Yorkshire	11	1	0	0	3

Percy Brown (birth unknown – death unknown) was an English professional rugby league footballer who played in the 1920s. He played at representative level for Yorkshire, and at club level for Dewsbury, as a forward, particularly at hooker.

== Background ==
Percy Brown was born in Normanton, West Riding of Yorkshire, England.

== Playing career ==
=== County honours ===
Percy Brown won cap(s) for Yorkshire while at Dewsbury.

=== Challenge Cup Final appearances ===
Percy Brown played hooker in Dewsbury's 2–13 defeat by Wigan in the 1929 Challenge Cup Final during the 1928–29 season at Wembley Stadium, London on Saturday 4 May 1929, in front of a crowd of 41,000.

== Contemporaneous article extract ==
"P. Brown' Dewsbury, (Northern Rugby League.) Percy Brown was born at Normanton, and can be regarded as a local discovery. He can play in any position forward, but he is usually in the front row, and is regarded as one of the finest "stickers" in Yorkshire. He has had county honours, and has been considered for International distinction. Brown is as prominent in the loose as in tight pack work and he is sure to claim further honours"
