= Joe Lyman =

English rugby league footballer and coach

Personal information
- Full name: Joseph Lyman
- Born: c. 1895
- Died: 1976 (aged 81)

Playing information
- Height: 5 ft 8 in (1.73 m)
- Weight: 11 st 0 lb (70 kg) to 13 st 0 lb (83 kg)
- Position: Backs, Forwards, Loose forward
Club
Years	Team	Pld	T	G	FG	P
≤1913–≤13	Featherstone Rovers
1913–31	Dewsbury	454	144
	Total	454	144	0	0	0
Representative
Years	Team	Pld	T	G	FG	P
1919–29	Yorkshire	4	5	5	0	25

Coaching information
Club
Years	Team	Gms	W	D	L	W%
1931–34	Batley
≥1934–≥34	Dewsbury
	Total	0	0	0	0

Joseph Lyman (c. 1895 – 1976) was a professional rugby league footballer who played in the 1910s, 1920s and 1930s, and coached in the 1930s. He played at club level for Featherstone Rovers (who were a "junior" club at the time), and Dewsbury (captain from the 1925–26 season). A goal-kicker, he initially played in the backs, and later as a forward including loose forward, and coached at club level for Batley and Dewsbury.

== Playing career ==
=== Challenge Cup Final appearances ===
Joe Lyman played loose forward, and was captain in Dewsbury's 2–13 defeat by Wigan in the 1929 Challenge Cup Final during the 1928–29 season at Wembley Stadium, London on Saturday 4 May 1929, in front of a crowd of 41,000.

=== Career records ===
Joe Lyman holds Dewsbury's "Most Career Appearances" record with 454 appearances, and "Most Career Tries" record with 144 tries.

== Coaching career ==
=== Club career ===
Joe Lyman was the coach of Batley from July 1931 to November 1934.

== Genealogical information ==
Joe Lyman was the brother of the rugby league footballer who played for Batley; Jim Lyman.
