= David Hill (rugby league) =

English rugby league footballer (1946–2025)

Personal information
- Full name: David Hill
- Born: 27 June 1946 St. Helens, England
- Died: 31 January 2025 (aged 78) Southport, England

Playing information

Rugby union
Club
Years	Team	Pld	T	G	FG	P
196?–67	Liverpool St Helens F.C.

Rugby league
- Position: Stand-off, Centre
Club
Years	Team	Pld	T	G	FG	P
1967–77	Wigan	329	113	15	0	369
1977	Oldham	12	0	0	0	0
1977–78	Barrow	6
	Total	347	113	15	0	369
Representative
Years	Team	Pld	T	G	FG	P
1969	Lancashire	1
1971	Great Britain	1	0	0	0	0
- Education: Ashton-in-Makerfield Grammar School
- Relatives: Cliff Hill (brother)

David Hill (27 June 1946 – 31 January 2025) was an English rugby league footballer who played in the 1960s and 1970s. He played at representative level for Great Britain and Lancashire, and at club level for Wigan, Oldham and Barrow as a Stand-off or Centre.

== Playing career ==
=== Wigan ===
Hill joined Wigan in October 1967 from Liverpool rugby union club.

He played stand-off in Wigan's 6–11 defeat by Leigh in the 1969 BBC2 Floodlit Trophy Final during the 1969–70 season at Central Park, Wigan on Tuesday 16 December 1969.

Hill played stand-off in Wigan's 15–8 victory over Widnes in the 1971 Lancashire Cup Final during the 1971–72 season at Knowsley Road, St. Helens on Saturday 28 August 1971, and played right-centre in the 19–9 victory over Salford in the 1973 Lancashire Cup Final during the 1973–74 season at Wilderspool Stadium, Warrington, on Saturday 13 October 1973.

=== International honours ===
Hill won a cap for Great Britain while at Wigan in 1971 against France.

== Personal life and death ==
Hill died on 31 January 2025, at the age of 78.

He was the younger brother of the rugby league footballer Cliff Hill. David Hill attended Ashton-in-Makerfield Grammar School.
