= Cliff Hill (rugby league) =

English rugby league footballer (1943–2021)

Personal information
- Full name: John Clifford Hill
- Born: 24 February 1943 St Helens, England
- Died: 8 April 2021 (aged 78)

Playing information
- Position: Stand-off, Fullback, Centre
Club
Years	Team	Pld	T	G	FG	P
1964–70	Wigan	192	57	0	0	171
1971–73	Oldham	59	9	0	0	27
	Total	251	66	0	0	198
Representative
Years	Team	Pld	T	G	FG	P
	Lancashire	1
1966	Great Britain	1	0	0	0	0
- Relatives: David Hill (brother)

John Clifford Hill (24 February 1943 – 8 April 2021) was a professional rugby league footballer who played in the 1960s and 1970s. He played at representative level for Great Britain and Lancashire, and at club level for Wigan and Oldham, as a stand-off.

He was born in St Helens Hospital, but raised in Ashton-in-Makerfield, Greater Manchester, England.

== Playing career ==
=== Wigan ===
Hill joined Wigan in 1964 from the Newton-le-Willows rugby union club.

Hill played stand-off in Wigan's 20-16 victory over Hunslet in the 1965 Challenge Cup Final during the 1964–65 season at Wembley Stadium, London on Saturday 8 May 1965, in front of a crowd of 89,016, and appeared as a substitute (replacing Fullback Colin Tyrer, and became the first ever Interchange/Substitute to play in a Challenge Cup Final) in Wigan's 2-7 defeat by Castleford in the 1970 Challenge Cup Final during the 1969–70 season at Wembley Stadium, London on Saturday 9 May 1970, in front of a crowd of 95,255.

Hill played stand-off in Wigan's 16-13 victory over Oldham in the 1966 Lancashire Cup Final during the 1966–67 season at Station Road, Swinton, on Saturday 29 October 1966.

Hill played stand-off, and scored a try in Wigan's 7-4 victory over St. Helens in the 1968 BBC2 Floodlit Trophy Final during the 1968–69 season at Central Park, Wigan on Tuesday 17 December 1968, and played fullback in the 6-11 defeat by Leigh in the 1969 BBC2 Floodlit Trophy Final during the 1969–70 season at Central Park, Wigan on Tuesday 16 December 1969.

He was sold to Oldham in 1971 for a fee of £2,250.

=== Representative honours ===
Cliff Hill won a cap for Great Britain while at Wigan in 1966 against France.

Cliff Hill played in Wigan's victory in the Lancashire County Cup during the 1969–70 season

== Personal life ==
Cliff Hill is the older brother of the rugby league footballer; David Hill.
