= Wilfred Hodder =

Wales dual-code international rugby footballer and RL administrator

Wilf Hodder
Personal information
- Full name: Wilfred Hodder
- Born: 6 May 1896 Abersychan, Wales
- Died: 12 November 1957 (aged 61) Morecambe/Lancaster, Lancashire, England

Playing information

Rugby union
- Position: Lock
Club
Years	Team	Pld	T	G	FG	P
	Talywain RFC
≤1921–21	Pontypool RFC
	Total	0	0	0	0	0
Representative
Years	Team	Pld	T	G	FG	P
1921	Wales	3	1			3

Rugby league
- Position: Prop, Second-row
Club
Years	Team	Pld	T	G	FG	P
1921–29	Wigan	273	35			105
Representative
Years	Team	Pld	T	G	FG	P
1922–28	Wales	6
1926	Other Nationalities	1	0	0	0	0

Wilfred Hodder (6 May 1896 – 12 November 1957) was a Welsh dual-code international rugby union, and professional rugby league footballer who played in the 1910s and 1920s, and rugby league administrator. He played representative level rugby union (RU) for Wales, and at club level for Talywain RFC and Pontypool RFC, as a lock, and representative level rugby league (RL) for Wales, and at club level for Wigan, as a prop or second-row. He was later a member of the board of directors at Wigan RLFC.

== Background ==
Hodder was born in Abersychan, Wales, he was a miner, hotelier, served in the Royal Field Artillery in World War I, and he died aged 61 in Morecambe/Lancaster, Lancashire.

== Playing career ==
=== International honours ===
Hodder won 6 caps for Wales (RU) in 1922–1928 while at Pontypool RFC in 1921 against England, Scotland, and France, and won caps for Wales (RL) while at Wigan, including the 34–8 victory over New Zealand at Pontypridd in 1926, and five losses to England.

=== Club career ===
Hodder was in the Wigan team that won the Challenge Cup final when it was played for the first time at the Empire Stadium, Wembley on 4 May 1929. He was one of five Welshmen in the Wigan side. He also won the League Championship in his first season, the Lancashire Cup and League in his second season, the Lancashire League again in 1923/24, the Lancashire League and League Championship in 1924/25 and the Lancashire Cup in 1928/29.

=== Championship final appearances ===
Hodder played at prop in Wigan's 13–2 victory over Oldham in the Championship Final during the 1921–22 season at The Cliff, Broughton on Saturday 6 May 1922, and played at prop in the 22–10 victory over Warrington in the Championship Final during the 1925–26 season at Knowsley Road, St. Helens on Saturday 8 May 1926.

=== County Cup Final appearances ===
Hodder played at prop in Wigan's 20–2 victory over Leigh in the 1922–23 Lancashire Cup Final during the 1922–23 season at The Willows, Salford on Saturday 25 November 1922, played at prop in the 11–15 defeat by Swinton in the 1925–26 Lancashire Cup Final during the 1925–26 season at The Cliff, Broughton on Wednesday 9 December 1925, and played at prop in the 5–4 victory over Widnes in the 1928–29 Lancashire Cup Final during the 1928–29 season at The Willows, Salford on Saturday 24 November 1928.
