= Roy Kinnear (rugby) =

Scotland international rugby union and GB international rugby league footballer

Personal information
- Full name: Robert Muir Kinnear
- Born: 3 February 1904 Edinburgh, Scotland
- Died: 22 September 1942 (aged 38) Uxbridge, England

Playing information

Rugby union
- Position: Centre
Club
Years	Team	Pld	T	G	FG	P
19??–27	Heriot's Rugby Club
	RAFRU
	Total	0	0	0	0	0
Representative
Years	Team	Pld	T	G	FG	P
1926	Scotland	3	0	0	0	0
1924	British Lions	4	0	0	0	0

Rugby league
- Position: Centre
Club
Years	Team	Pld	T	G	FG	P
1927–33	Wigan	182	81	0	0	243
Representative
Years	Team	Pld	T	G	FG	P
1929–30	Other Nationalities	3	3	0	0	9
1929	Great Britain	1	0	0	0	0

Robert Muir "Roy" Kinnear (3 February 1904 – 22 September 1942) was a Scottish dual-code international rugby union and professional rugby league footballer who played in the 1920s and 1930s. He played representative level rugby union (RU) for British Lions and Scotland and representative level rugby league (RL) for Great Britain and Other Nationalities. His son was the character actor Roy Kinnear and his grandson is the actor Rory Kinnear.

== Biography ==
He played club level rugby union (RU) for Heriot's Rugby Club as a Centre. Kinnear won caps for Scotland in 1926 against France, Wales and Ireland and won caps for British and Irish Lions while at Heriot's Rugby Club in 1924 against South Africa (4 matches). He was unique amongst Scottish rugby union defectors in that he originally played for a former pupils (FP) club, rather than one of the Border teams.

Kinnear played rugby league for Wigan as a centre. He played right-centre in Wigan's 5–4 victory over Widnes in the 1928 Lancashire Cup Final during the 1928–29 season at Wilderspool Stadium, Warrington on Saturday 24 November 1928.

Kinnear played left-centre and scored a try in Wigan's 13–2 victory over Dewsbury in the 1928–29 Northern Rugby Football League season's Challenge Cup Final at Wembley Stadium, London on Saturday 4 May 1929.

He won caps for Other Nationalities (RL) while at Wigan in 1929 against England, in 1930 against England (2 matches), and won a cap for Great Britain (RL) while at Wigan in 1929 against Australia.

He scored 81 tries in 182 games for Wigan.

A Flight Sergeant in the Royal Air Force, he collapsed and died while playing rugby union with the RAF during World War II in 1942, aged 38. He was buried at Uxbridge and Hillingdon Cemetery.

The Scotland Rugby League Student Player of the Year Award is named after him.

== See also ==
- List of Scottish rugby union players killed in World War II

== Sources ==
- Bath, Richard (ed.), The Scotland Rugby Miscellany (Vision Sports Publishing Ltd, 2007 ISBN 1-905326-24-6)
- Massie, Allan, A Portrait of Scottish Rugby (Polygon, Edinburgh; ISBN 0-904919-84-6)
