= Tommy Parker (rugby league) =

Wales international rugby league footballer & coach

Personal information
- Full name: Thomas Parker
- Born: 22 May 1901 Cwmafan, Wales
- Died: 17 April 1969 (aged 67) Cwmafan, Wales

Playing information
- Position: Centre
Club
Years	Team	Pld	T	G	FG	P
1923–31	Wigan	241	113	0	0	339
1931–35	Barrow
1935–37	Côte Basque XIII
	Total	241	113	0	0	339
Representative
Years	Team	Pld	T	G	FG	P
1924	Other Nationalities	1	0	0	0	0
1927	Glamorgan	1	0	0	0	0
1928–30	Wales	2	0	0	0	0

Coaching information
Club
Years	Team	Gms	W	D	L	W%
1935–38	Côte Basque XIII
1938–39	Albi
	Total	0	0	0	0
- Relatives: Gwyn Parker (brother)

Thomas Parker (1901 – 1969) was a Welsh professional rugby league footballer who played in the 1920s and 1930s. He played at representative level for Wales and Glamorgan, and at club level for Wigan, as a centre.

== Playing career ==
=== Club career ===
Tommy Parker played at centre in Wigan's 22–10 victory over Warrington in the Championship Final during the 1925–26 season at Knowsley Road, St. Helens on Saturday 8 May 1926.

Tommy Parker played at centre in Wigan's 5–4 victory over Widnes in the 1928–29 Lancashire Cup Final during the 1928–29 season at Wilderspool Stadium, Warrington on Saturday 24 November 1928.

In September 1931, Parker was transferred to Barrow.

=== Representative honours ===
Tommy Parker won two caps for Wales in 1928–1930 while at Wigan.

Tommy Parker played at centre in Glamorgan's 18–14 victory over Monmouthshire in the non-County Championship match during the 1926–27 season at Taff Vale Park, Pontypridd on Saturday 30 April 1927.

== Personal life ==
Tommy Parker's younger brother, Gwyn Parker, was also a rugby league player.
