= 1928–29 Northern Rugby Football League season =

- League: Championship
- Teams: 28
- Champions: Huddersfield (4th title)
- League Leaders: Huddersfield
- Runners-up: Leeds
- Top point-scorer(s): (Wales) Jim Sullivan (226)
- Top try-scorer(s): (New Zealand) Lou Brown (Australia) Ernie Mills (44)
- Joined League: Carlisle City
- Resigned from the League: Carlisle City

The 1928–29 Rugby Football League season was the 34th season of rugby league football.

== Season summary ==
Huddersfield won their fourth Championship when they beat Leeds 2-0 in the play-off final.

On 4 May 1929 the first Challenge Cup Final to be held at Wembley Stadium was played. 41,500 saw Wigan beat Dewsbury 13-2.

Carlisle City fielded a team, but resigned after 10 matches and their record was expunged from the table. They won 1 and lost 9, scoring 59 and conceding 166.

Swinton moved from their Chorley Road ground this season due to a dispute over rent. They built a new stadium at Station Road, Swinton using the stands from the old ground.

== Championship ==
Pos	Team	Pld	W	D	L	PF	PA	PAv	PCT	Qualification
1	Huddersfield	38	26	4	8	476	291	1.636	73.68	Qualification for the Championship play-offs
2	Hull Kingston Rovers	40	27	3	10	436	239	1.824	71.25	Qualification for the Championship play-offs
3	Leeds	38	26	2	10	695	270	2.574	71.05	Qualification for the Championship play-offs
4	Salford	34	23	2	9	395	222	1.779	70.59	Qualification for the Championship play-offs
5	Wigan	38	26	1	11	636	308	2.065	69.74	
6	Swinton	36	23	2	11	429	249	1.723	66.67	
7	Warrington	36	22	2	12	568	295	1.925	63.89	
8	St Helens Recs	38	22	1	15	545	374	1.457	59.21	
9	Oldham	36	18	4	14	439	343	1.280	55.56	
10	Hunslet	38	19	4	15	539	356	1.514	55.26	
11	St Helens	38	19	4	15	460	381	1.207	55.26	
12	Hull	40	20	4	16	458	395	1.159	55.00	
13	Leigh	34	17	3	14	285	279	1.022	54.41	
14	Wigan Highfield	32	16	1	15	262	333	0.787	51.56	
15	Dewsbury	36	17	2	17	380	387	0.982	50.00	
16	Halifax	40	18	3	19	379	399	0.950	48.75	
17	Wakefield Trinity	40	17	4	19	400	461	0.868	47.50	
18	Barrow	32	13	2	17	396	387	1.023	43.75	
19	Batley	38	14	2	22	278	442	0.629	39.47	
20	Broughton Rangers	30	11	1	18	235	401	0.586	38.33	
21	Castleford	34	11	4	19	268	369	0.726	38.24	
22	York	34	12	0	22	259	409	0.633	35.29	
23	Bramley	34	11	2	21	241	437	0.551	35.29	
24	Widnes	34	11	2	21	222	439	0.506	35.29	
25	Featherstone Rovers	38	10	4	24	277	451	0.614	31.58	
26	Rochdale Hornets	34	10	0	24	235	434	0.541	29.41	
27	Keighley	34	8	2	24	209	422	0.495	26.47	
28	Bradford Northern	38	5	3	30	242	871	0.278	17.11	
–	Carlisle City (Note: Carlisle City resigned from the league in November and folded. Their record (Pld 10, W 1, L 9, PF 59, PA 166, PCT 10.00) was expunged.)	0	0	0	0	0	0	—	—	

== Championship play-off ==
Semi-finals
1	Huddersfield	13
4	Salford	5
2	Hull Kingston Rovers	4
3	Leeds	7

Championship final
Huddersfield	2
Leeds	0

=== Final ===
11 May 1929

Huddersfield	2 – 0	Leeds
Goals: Brook

Thrum Hall, Halifax
Attendance: 25,604
Referee: F. Fairhurst (Wigan)

Huddersfield	Number	Leeds
	Teams	
Joe Brook	1	Jim Brough
Ernie Mills	2	George Andrews
Len Bowkett	3	Mel Rosser
Gwyn Parker	4	Frank O'Rourke
Fred Smart	5	Arthur Lloyd
Stanley Spencer	6	Jeff Moores
Eddie Williams	7	Walter Swift
Sam Gee	8	Daniel Pascoe
Cyril Halliday	9	William Demaine
John Rudd	10	Joe Thompson
Clifford Morton	11	Bill Davis
Percy Carter	12	Arthur Thomas
Harold Young	13	Frank Gallagher

== County leagues ==
Swinton won the Lancashire League, and Huddersfield won the Yorkshire League.

== Challenge Cup ==
Wigan beat Dewsbury 13–2 in the first final to be played at Wembley Stadium in front of a crowd of 41,000.

This was Wigan’s second Challenge Cup Final win in their fourth Cup Final appearance.

== County cups ==
Wigan beat Widnes 5–4 to win the Lancashire Cup, and Leeds beat Featherstone Rovers 5–0 to win the Yorkshire Cup.

== Sources ==
- 1928-29 Rugby Football League season at wigan.rlfans.com
- The Challenge Cup at The Rugby Football League website
