= List of Warrington Wolves players =

The Warrington Wolves (named Warrington Zingari in 1876, and just Warrington from 1877 to 1996) are an English rugby league club who have had numerous notable players throughout their history.

== List ==
Last updated: 8 April 2026

No.	Name	Début	Last match	Position	Apps	Tries	Goals	Drop goals	Points	Captain	Honours	Representative	Records/Notes
312	Norman Abbott	25 April 1925	25 April 1925	Centre	1	0	0	0	0				Signed from Wigan Old Boys RUFC
867	Darren Abram	8 March 1987	8 March 1987	Centre	1	0	0	0	0				
637	Keith Affleck	12 April 1963	5 September 1969	Fullback	96	15	197	2	443				Kicked 100 goals in 1966–67 season
1142	Sitaleki Akauola	23 February 2018	24 September 2021	Centre, Prop, Second-row	68	6	0	0	24				Début v Wigan Warriors
515	Ken Alderton	21 January 1950	28 January 1950	Left wing	2	0	0	0	0				Début at Wigan in front of 35,000 crowd
100	… Aldred	15 March 1902	15 March 1902	Forward	1	0	0	0	0				Played in Challenge Cup tie against Barrow at Wilderspool
445	… Allan	4 May 1940	18 May 1940	Second-row, Loose forward	4	1	0	0	3				Only try came at Liverpool Stanley
677	Bill Allen	1 November 1967	7 April 1969	Centre	28	9	15	0	57				Played in 1967 Lancashire Cup final replay defeat by St Helens
849	Dave Allen	16 December 1984	27 April 1986	Forward	18	0	0	0	0				Controversially signed by Reg Bowden from Fulham, as the RFL deemed him a free-agent
67	Jack Allen	17 December 1898	29 April 1902	Stand-off	31	0	0	0	0				Made 23 appearances in the 1901–02 season
998	David Alstead	3 September 2000	22 September 2002	Fullback	34	3	0	0	12				Failed drug test, but cleared of wrongdoing
1179	Kyle Amor	3 June 2022	30 July 2022	Prop, Loose forward	4	0	0	0	0				On loan from St Helens
99	J. Anders	8 March 1902	8 March 1902	Forward	1	0	0	0	0				Played in an 8–4 victory over Hunslet at Wilderspool
627	Joe Anders	13 January 1962	13 January 1962	Second-row	1	0	0	0	0				Played against Huddersfield at Wilderspool
1078	Louis Anderson	8 February 2008	30 September 2011	Second-row	104	24	0	0	96				Début v Hull FC
259	Tommy Anderson	19 February 1921	18 April 1922	Scrum-half	39	2	0	0	6				1921 Lancashire Cup winner
1072	Vinnie Anderson	9 February 2007	18 September 2010	Second-row	88	31	0	0	124				New Zealander. Debut v Wigan Warriors
21	James 'Shant' Andrews	28 September 1895	26 December 1900	Forward	49	0	0	0	0				Killed at Gallipoli in August 1915
83	J. Antrobus	3 February 1900	1 April 1904	Forward	12	0	0	0	0				Made début in a 13–10 victory at Broughton Rangers
1029	Graham Appo	19 May 2002	7 August 2005	Fullback, Stand-off	76	37	83	0	314				Australian star of the 2003 season
596	John Arkwright Jr.	14 February 1959	10 March 1962	Unknown	97	6	0	0	18				Signed from Wigan Athletic F.C., 1959 Lancashire Cup winner
394	Jack Arkwright Sr.	29 September 1934	8 September 1945	Second-row	164	30	4	0	98				
348	A. Armstrong	20 March 1928	24 March 1928	Wing	2	0	0	0	0				Made one appearance on each wing
572	Alan Armstrong	27 October 1956	27 October 1956	Prop	1	0	0	0	0				Only appearance against Australia
559	Alf Arnold	23 October 1954	20 September 1958	Scrum-half	56	10	1	0	32				Forced to retire with an eye injury
334	James Arnold	27 August 1927	12 November 1927	Scrum-half	10	0	0	0	0				Signed from Swinton
179	John Arnold	30 September 1911	24 March 1913	Forward	29	1	0	0	3				Scored his only try at Huddersfield in September 1912
310	Charlie Arrowsmith	14 March 1925	26 November 1927	Loose forward	8	1	0	0	3				Signed from Wigan Old Boys RUFC, only try against Salford
625	Ernie Ashcroft	4 November 1961	10 February 1962	Centre	6	0	0	0	0				
655	Keith Ashcroft	28 August 1965	17 January 1969	Prop	113	5	0	0	15				Signed from Bradford Northern, Lancashire League winner in 1967–68
728	Kevin Ashcroft	20 August 1972	10 May 1975	Hooker	124	20	0	23	101	©			
640	Peter Ashcroft	26 October 1963	11 September 1965	Wing	20	5	0	0	15				Signed from Warrington Colts, Wigan Sevens winner in 1965
135	Charles L. Ashton	19 March 1906	16 April 1906	Fullback	2	1	0	0	3				Scored his only try in an 8–0 win at St Helens
327	Ernie Ashton	11 December 1926	10 April 1928	Wing	2	0	0	0	0				Played in record 68–14 defeat at Hunslet RLFC in April 1928
277	Harry Ashton	25 March 1922	10 November 1923	Stand-off	39	2	0	1	8				Signed from Crosfields, 27 appearances in 1922–23 season
1158	Matty Ashton	30 January 2020	present	Fullback, Wing	116	105	0	0	420			England	Début v Wigan Warriors
81	Walter Ashton	20 January 1900	1 January 1906	Forward	25	0	0	0	0				Transferred to Leigh, private in the Boer War
64	J. Ashurst	24 September 1898	18 November 1899	Stand-off	34	3	4	0	17				Key figure in first season at Wilderspool, 1898–99
1107	Roy Asotasi	13 February 2014	24 September 2015	Prop	59	6	1	0	26				Big signing from South Sydney Rabbitohs to replace Adrian Morley. Début v St Helens
666	Alan Aspey	17 September 1966	18 April 1970	Wing	22	7	0	0	21				Signed from Vulcan RU, transferred to Wigan
403	G. Aspey	31 August 1935	7 September 1935	Prop	3	0	0	0	0				
603	John Aspey	21 November 1959	12 December 1959	Fullback	2	0	0	0	0				Unlucky with injuries, including a broken leg
631	Willie Aspinall	20 April 1962	18 April 1971	Stand-off	268	55	40	30	305	©			
606	Denis Atherton	2 January 1960	7 January 1961	Wing	12	5	0	0	15				Made a try-scoring début at Wilderspool to Swinton
494	Jack Atherton	21 August 1948	3 September 1951	Forward	21	5	1	0	17				Signed from St Helens Recs
1089	Ryan Atkins	7 February 2010	18 May 2019	Centre	273	168	0	0	672			England	Signed from Wakefield Trinity Wildcats for £100,000. Début v Harlequins RL
1147	Blake Austin	2 February 2019	16 September 2021	Stand-off, Scrum-half	67	33	0	6	138			Great Britain	Australian. Début v Leeds Rhinos
684	Warren Ayres	19 November 1968	23 October 1970	Halfback	66	33	0	0	99				Signed from Warrington Colts, sold to Wigan
873	Mike 'Streaky' Bacon	27 October 1987	22 April 1990	Wing	7	1	0	0	4				Signed from Thatto Heath ARLFC
308	… Bailey	26 December 1924	26 December 1924	Second-row	1	0	0	0	0				Made only appearance at Rochdale
18	E. Bailey	21 September 1895	21 September 1895	Forward	1	0	0	0	0				From Warrington's rugby union days
106	E. Bailey	10 January 1903	24 January 1903	Wing	2	0	0	0	0				
1130	Ryan Bailey	21 May 2016	8 October 2016	Prop	15	0	0	0	0				Former Great Britain and England prop who made his name at Leeds. Début v Castleford Tigers
448	A. Baker	14 September 1940	25 December 1940	Second-row, Loose forward	5	1	0	0	3				Made a try-scoring début against Broughton Rangers
207	Jim Baker	10 April 1914	24 April 1915	Wing	32	5	0	0	15				Played for Runcorn during World War I
341	John Baker	26 November 1927	28 January 1928	Wing	3	0	0	0	0				Signed after scoring four tries in a reserve game
528	John Bamber	29 August 1951	19 April 1957	Fullback	14	0	0	0	0				Signed directly from school in St Helens
461	Bob Band	8 September 1945	20 November 1948	Hooker	15	1	0	0	3				Played against Warrington in 1950 Challenge Cup final
244	John Edward Banner	31 January 1920	6 March 1920	Left wing	5	0	0	0	0				Played five games in a row
1	Fairfield Barber	7 September 1895	27 December 1897	Centre	70	13	17	0	76	©			Later Warrington chairman, and president
920	Tukere Barlow	6 November 1994	17 April 1995	Hooker	26	9	0	0	36				Kiwi who played in 1995 Regal Trophy final defeat
1067	Richie Barnett	19 February 2006	28 May 2007	Wing	41	18	0	0	72				Signed from Hull FC, moved to Salford, failed drugs test
226	… Baron	1 February 1919	1 February 1919	Scrum-half	1	0	0	0	0				Only appearance in a 3–8 defeat at St Helens
22	W. Barrett	28 September 1895	24 September 1898	Forward	76	1	0	0	3				Scored his only try against Broughton Rangers
936	Paul Barrow	15 December 1995	8 June 1997	Second-row	19	2	0	0	8				
689	Conrad Barton	19 April 1969	24 September 1972	Right wing	95	26	0	0	78				Signed from Wigan RUFC
256	Joseph Barton	23 October 1920	25 March 1921	Prop, Second-row	10	0	0	0	0				
2	John T. 'Smack' Bate	7 September 1895	23 February 1901	Scrum-half	104	17	0	0	51	© 1897...1901			Known as 'Smack' because he clapped his hands once every time he wanted the ball, brother of Robert Bate
59	Robert Bate	2 April 1898	18 March 1905	Stand-off	55	4	0	0	12				Brother of John Bate, Stand-off in Warrington's first Challenge Cup final in 1901
902	Allan Bateman	7 October 1990	7 May 1995	Centre	142	52	0	1	209			Great Britain	Famous for his excellent defence, 3 Great Britain caps
1007	Dave Bates	17 August 2001	9 September 2001	Prop	3	0	0	0	0				Signed on loan from Castleford
1210	John Bateman	2 August 2024	4 October 2024	Centre, Second-row, Loose forward	10	1	0	0	4			England	On loan from Wests Tigers
493	Harry Bath	17 March 1948	9 February 1957	Forward	346	90	812	0	1804	©			Australian
382	Bill Baxter	16 September 1933	7 May 1936	Fullback	19	0	5	0	10				Signed from Leigh, reserve for 1936 Challenge Cup final
463	J. Baxter	15 September 1945	9 February 1946	Fullback	10	4	0	0	12				Signed from Leigh, reserve for 1936 Challenge Cup final
613	Tom Baynham	30 April 1960	17 August 1962	Hooker	2	0	0	0	0				
363	Bob Beattie	4 September 1930	5 December 1931	Halfback	20	3	0	0	9				Cumbrian, signed from Wigan Old Boys RUFC
546	John Bebe	14 February 1953	12 January 1957	Halfback	8	1	0	0	3				
426	Billy Belshaw	30 October 1937	9 March 1946	Fullback, Centre, Stand-off	132	29	168	5	433				
121	James Belton	3 September 1904	3 September 1910	Forward	158	6	0	0	18				Played in two Challenge Cup-winning teams, 1905 and 1907
172	W. J. Benjamin	1 October 1910	1 October 1910	Halfback	1	0	0	0	0				Signed from Mountain Ash RFC
909	Andrew "Andy" Bennett	13 October 1992	30 June 1996	Scrum-half, Hooker	61	13	0	0	52				Played in 1995 Regal Trophy final
361	Fred Bennett	1 March 1930	1 March 1930	Halfback	1	0	0	0	0				
423	Ivor Bennett	28 August 1937	9 November 1946	Second-row	73	13	0	0	39				
361	Nat Bentham	11 January 1930	11 May 1935	Hooker	202	2	0	0	6				
1222	James Bentley	6 February 2026	present	Hooker, Second-row, Loose forward	1	0	0	0	0			Ireland	Début v Sheffield Eagles in the Challenge Cup, but came off injured after one minute. Joined from Leeds Rhinos
793	Billy Benyon	9 October 1977	15 April 1981	Centre	94	16	0	0	48				Signed from St Helens, Warrington coach 1978–82
125	Herbert Berry	25 February 1905	1 March 1913	Fullback	54	3	5	0	19				Also played for Everton F.C.
3	James 'Buff' Berry	7 September 1895	25 April 1896		11	0	0	0	0				Forward from RU days. Rifleman killed in World War I aged 48
1040	Phil Berry	26 October 2003	26 October 2003	Wing	1	0	0	0	0				Sacked in 2005 after failing a drugs test
470	Brian Bevan	17 November 1945	23 April 1962	Wing	620	740	34	0	2288				
189	Dai Bevan	28 September 1912	25 September 1920	Second-row	16	0	0	0	0				
745	John Bevan	23 September 1973	2 February 1986	Wing, Centre	332	201	6	1	628				
503	Owen 'Ozzy' Bevan	5 February 1949	24 November 1951	Centre, Loose forward	55	16	24	0	96				Brother of Brian Bevan, moved to Leigh
616	Ray Birchall	18 March 1961	3 April 1961	Halfback	2	0	0	0	0				
845	Paul Bishop	21 October 1984	20 October 1990	Halfback	113	38	183	42	560				Once kicked five drop goals in a match at Wigan
263	Dickie Blackburn	27 August 1921	18 April 1927	Right wing	169	65	0	0	195				Played in 1926 Championship Final against Wigan
827	Mick Blacker	23 January 1983	29 April 1984	Stand-off	43	11	0	0	37				Signed from Halifax, became Mansfield Marksman coach
854	Phil Blake	25 September 1985	26 February 1989	Centre, Stand-off	44	41	0	4	168				Could score tries out of nothing
986	Steve Blakeley	13 February 2000	1 May 2000	Stand-off	10	1	9	0	22				Signed from Salford, quickly returned to the Willows
354	Tom Blinkhorn	1 December 1928	6 May 1933	Wing	126	52	36	0	228				
200	W. H. Blundell	18 October 1913	18 October 1913	Forward	1	0	0	0	0				Made only appearance against Barrow in Lancashire Cup
1077	Matty Blythe	14 September 2007	11 June 2017	Centre, Second-row	69	11	0	0	44				Irlam-born. Two stints, namely 2007-12 & 2017. Debut v Salford Red Devils
61	Alfred Boardman	3 September 1898	17 January 1914	Forward	403	29	0	0	87			England & Lancashire	
1157	GA Boardman	21 April 1923	21 April 1923	Unknown	1	0	0	0	0				Historical correction. A single appearance v Barrow
143	Peter Boardman	5 October 1907	6 April 1912	Forward	64	5	0	0	15				Played in Warrington's first four Challenge Cup finals
241	James Booth	10 January 1920	10 January 1920	Hooker	1	0	0	0	0				Made only appearance in an 18–0 defeat at Rochdale
644	Jeff Bootle	1 February 1964	19 April 1969	Fullback	171	42	333	12	816	©			Captained 1965 Lancashire Cup winning team
4	Joe 'Surefoot' Boscow	7 September 1895	20 January 1900	Fullback	37	0	0	0	0				Played for Lancashire County Rugby Football Union (RU) from Warrington's rugby union days
842	Reg Bowden	16 September 1984	9 December 1984	Scrum-half	10	0	0	0	0				Former Widnes, Warrington coach 1984–86
855	Les Boyd	2 October 1985	16 April 1989	Prop	86	20	0	0	80	©			Hard Australian, captained 1986 Premiership winning team
1058	Andy Bracek	27 February 2005	13 September 2008	Second-row	60	8	0	0	32				England Academy, signed from St Helens
257	Bob Bradbury	27 November 1920	7 October 1922	Wing	57	19	0	0	57				
157	A. Bradshaw	20 March 1909	17 January 1914	Forward	9	1	0	0	3				
155	Bert Bradshaw	24 October 1908	24 April 1915	Wing	113	55	0	0	165				Try scorer in 1913 Challenge Cup final
653	Brian 'Bully' Brady	1 May 1965	28 December 1975	Prop	328	54	0	0	162				Older brother of Jim Brady, record try scorer for Warrington prop
698	Jim Brady	22 March 1970	6 March 1971	Scrum-half	11	2	0	0	6				
1103	Arthur Gladstone 'Cobbler' Bramhall	28 December 1914	28 December 1914	Fullback	1	0	0	0	0				Signed from Rylands (Heritage number retroactively allocated)
132	James Bramhall	1 January 1906	28 December 1914	Fullback	2	0	0	0	0				Only appearance against Dewsbury at Wilderspool, won 16–0
1161	Keanan Brand	28 February 2020	29 September 2020	Centre	3	0	0	0	0				Joined Leigh Leopards
705	Jack Brennan	9 January 1971	15 January 1971	Scrum-half	3	1	0	0	3				Signed from Salford, played at 1969 Challenge Cup final at Wembley
255	William Brennan	16 October 1920	27 August 1921	Hooker	28	0	0	0	0				Signed from St Helens Recs, later joined Batley
958	Liam Bretherton	23 May 1997	30 May 1997	Stand-off	2	0	0	0	0				Signed from Orrell St James, moved to Whitehaven
1060	Chris Bridge	20 March 2005	19 June 2015	Wing, Centre, Stand-off, Scrum-half	228	107	311	1	1051			England & Ireland	Signed from Bradford Bulls, brother of Danny Bridge. Début v Huddersfield Giants
1105	Danny Bridge	21 April 2013	5 May 2013	Second-row	3	0	0	0	0			Ireland	Brother of Chris Bridge, signed from Wigan, England Under-15s and Under-18s. Début v Keighley Cougars in the Challenge Cup
647	David Bridgewater	21 March 1964	21 March 1964	Prop	1	0	0	0	0				On loan from Leigh (13 appearances 1960–63)
955	Lee Briers	20 April 1997	5 October 2013	Stand-off	425	154	948	74	2586			Great Britain, Wales & Lancashire	Debut v St Helens
652	Barry Briggs	3 April 1965	4 November 1973	Second-row, Loose forward	149	31	3	2	103				Two spells with club, brother of Wilf Briggs
725	Wilf Briggs	7 November 1971	5 September 1975	Centre	112	48	20	10	204				Also Oldham RLFC. Leading try scorer in 1972–73, Substitute in 1975 Challenge Cup Final at Wembley, brother of Barry Briggs
586	Alastair Brindle	28 September 1957	12 April 1969	Prop	281	7	0	1	23				Warrington-born, played in 1959 Lancashire Cup win
320	Walter Brindle	6 March 1926	24 March 1928	Wing, Centre	4	0	0	0	0				Made début at Swinton
16	Fred Broady	14 September 1895	11 April 1896	Wing	19	2	0	1	10				Joined in 1893 when Stockton Heath RUFC folded
248	William Brockbank	24 April 1920	18 September 1920	Left-Centre	5	0	0	0	0				Made début against Wigan at Wilderspool
178	Arthur Brocklehurst	23 September 1911	28 October 1911	Forward	7	0	0	0	0				Died aged 21 in December 1911 of Typhoid fever/Paratyphoid fever (enteric fever)
555	Derek Brocklehurst	17 April 1954	17 April 1954	Second-row	1	0	0	0	0				Signed from Latchford Albion, went to work in Ireland
101	Ernie 'The Terrier' Brookes	22 November 1902	20 March 1920	Stand-off	297	81	25	0	293			Great Britain, England & Lancashire	
195	Alec Brown	17 January 1914	17 January 1914	Stand-off	1	0	0	0	0				Brother of John Brown, slightly built, Salford area, Killed in World War I
201	Charles Brown	14 December 1912	27 December 1913	Centre	7	0	0	0	0				Signed from Leigh, no relation to Brown brothers
420	Dave Brown	23 January 1937	29 April 1939	Centre	93	48	91	0	326				Prolific Australian, two tries in 1937 Lancashire Cup win
203	John Brown	27 December 1913	27 December 1913	Fullback	1	0	0	0	0				Brother of Alec Brown, fractured clavicle on début
406	K. Brown	19 October 1935	26 October 1935	Prop	2	0	0	0	0				Made début at Liverpool Stanley
1134	Kevin Brown	18 February 2017	13 October 2018	Centre, Stand-off, Scrum-half, Loose forward	55	17	0	0	68				Début v Brisbane Broncos in the World Club Challenge
1141	Mitch Brown	23 February 2018	17 August 2018	Centre, Fullback, Wing	12	2	0	0	8				Australian. Début v Wigan Warriors
442	Fred Bryan	23 March 1940	23 March 1940	Wing	1	0	0	0	0				Made only appearance in a 7–3 defeat at Widnes
17	A. Buckley	14 September 1895	21 September 1895	Forward	2	0	0	0	0				From Warrington's rugby union days
1177	Joe Bullock	12 February 2022	22 June 2024	Prop	51	2	0	0	8				Début v Leeds Rhinos
82	Arthur Burgess	20 January 1900	14 February 1903	Halfback	70	8	0	3	30				Transferred to Leigh (1903–07)
1102	Jordan Burke	15 April 2012	15 April 2012	Fullback	1	0	0	0	0				Signed from Rylands Sharks, made début aged 20 v Keighley Cougars in the Challenge Cup
892	Tony Burke	24 September 1989	1 January 1992	Prop	50	1	0	0	4				In 1989 Lancashire Cup win, and 1990 Challenge Cup final
1017	Darren Burns	10 February 2002	12 September 2004	Centre, Second-row	78	23	0	0	92				Australian signed from Brisbane, good professional
1154	Luther Burrell	6 July 2019	28 February 2020	Centre, Second-row	8	0	0	0	0				Début v London Broncos. ex-England RU
19	J. Burrows	21 September 1895	6 February 1897	Forward	43	1	0	0	3				Scored his only try against Leigh at Wilderspool Road
614	Billy Burrows	19 September 1960	3 February 1962	Scrum-half	9	1	0	0	3				Signed from Bickershaw Hornets, début aged 19 (born c. 1941)
5	Charlie Burton	7 September 1895	3 October 1896	Centre	25	1	4	2	20				Local lad signed from St Mary's in 1893
980	Dean Busby	14 February 1999	8 September 2002	Second-row	78	7	0	0	28				Signed from St Helens played for Wales
767	Brian Butler	12 October 1975	20 March 1977	Prop	55	4	0	0	12				
367	Lol Butler	26 February 1931	1 January 1934	Scrum-half	2	0	0	0	0				
1172	Rob Butler	2 April 2021	19 March 2022	Prop	6	0	0	0	0				Début v Leigh Leopards. Joined Wakefield Trinity
229	T. Butler	8 February 1919	3 May 1919	Halfback	4	1	0	0	3				Try-scoring début against St Helens at Wilderspool
520	Arthur Byrne	19 April 1950	26 April 1950	Hooker	3	1	0	0	3				Signed from Widnes St Maries, try-scoring début at Bradford Northern
1223	Liam Byrne	6 February 2026	present	Prop	6	0	0	0	0				
20	C. Callaghan	21 September 1895	21 September 1895	Forward	1	0	0	0	0				From Warrington's rugby union days
1031	Mike Callan	2 June 2002	3 August 2002	Second-row	4	0	0	0	0				Signed from Crosfields, moved on to Leigh Centurions
268	Stan Callan	5 September 1921	2 January 1922	Stand-off	13	1	0	0	3				Scored his only try against Wakefield Trinity at Wilderspool
76	… Campbell	3 April 1899	3 April 1899	Wing	1	0	0	0	0				Made only appearance in a 5–33 defeat at Runcorn
992	Chris Campbell	7 May 2000	28 July 2000	Wing	8	2	0	0	8				Son of referee David Campbell, moved to Whitehaven
839	Roy Campbell	1 April 1984	8 March 1987	Forward	8	1	0	0	4				Signed from Irlam Hornets, career ended by neck injury
671	Peter Cannon	3 December 1966	24 September 1972	Second-row	115	13	0	0	39				Warrington-born and bred, made his début at 18 (born c. 1948)
860	Phil Capewell	7 September 1986	8 March 1987	Forward	4	0	0	0	0				Signed from Widnes Tigers, moved on to Swinton
830	Brian Carbert	10 April 1983	3 December 1988	Wing	87	37	118	0	384				In 1986 Premiership Trophy win, 3 Great Britain Under-21 caps
1039	Daryl Cardiss	17 August 2003	17 September 2004	Fullback	28	4	3	0	22				Signed from Halifax, former Wigan
1018	Dale Cardoza	10 February 2002	19 April 2002	Centre	6	1	0	0	4				Unpredictable, signed from Huddersfield, moved to Leigh
223	James Carey	25 January 1919	1 February 1919	Centre, Stand-off	2	0	0	0	0				From the Wigan district
6	Paddy Carey	7 September 1895	5 February 1898	Wing	23	1	0	0	3				Scored his only try against Liversedge in February 1896
1086	Brian Carney	11 July 2009	31 July 2009	Wing	4	2	0	0	8				Former Wigan and Great Britain signed from Munster RU
954	Martin Carney	31 March 1997	31 March 1997	Forward	1	0	0	0	0				Signed from Orrell St James
667	Peter Carrington	5 November 1966	19 April 1969	Hooker	26	2	0	0	6				
887	Dean Carroll	5 March 1989	16 April 1989	Scrum-half	5	1	0	3	7				
180	Syd Carter	30 September 1911	30 September 1911	Centre	1	0	0	0	0				Signed from Rylands, played against Swinton
1084	Gareth Carvell	13 February 2009	5 October 2013	Prop	135	19	0	0	76			England	Signed from Hull FC, three-time Challenge Cup winner. Début v St Helens
249	Bert Cartwright	28 August 1920	7 April 1923	Wing	84	18	0	0	54				Signed from Wigan Highfield, played in 1921 Lancashire Cup win
137	Jack Cartwright	27 October 1906	10 September 1910	Wing, Centre	33	5	0	1	17				Killed in action in World War I in May 1918 aged 34 (born c. 1884)
775	Brian Case	22 February 1976	14 March 1982	Prop	191	14	0	0	42				
634	Brian Catterall	22 September 1962	29 February 1964	Wing	40	18	0	0	54				Signed from Ince Rangers
300	Eddie "Ned" Catterall	9 February 1924	4 December 1926	Centre	101	15	134	0	313				Signed from Wakefield Trinity, sold to Bradford Northern
961	Chris Causey	18 July 1997	12 September 1999	Second-row	23	1	0	0	4				Scored his only try against St Helens
397	Jack Chadwick	17 November 1934	16 November 1940	Loose forward	82	8	0	0	24				Played in 1936 Challenge Cup final at Wembley, sold to Halifax
542	Jim Challinor	22 November 1952	29 May 1963	Centre	282	135	0	2	409				
231	W. Chamberlain	15 February 1919	12 April 1919	Forward	6	1	0	0	3				From Wigan district, try-scoring début versus Oldham
894	Gary Chambers	2 November 1989	23 July 2000	Prop	210	10	0	0	40				Cumbrian, from Kells, 1991 Regal Trophy winner
404	William Chapman "Bill" Chapman	31 August 1935	4 January 1947	Loose forward	179	27	0	0	81				Welsh, from Bridgend (RFC?), 1937 Lancashire Cup winner. World War II Guest at Huddersfield during the 1944–45 season
1143	Josh Charnley	30 March 2018	30 April 2022	Centre, Wing	108	69	0	0	276				Début v Widnes Vikings. Joined from Sale Sharks RU
639	Norman Cherrington	28 August 1963	15 February 1964	Second-row	15	5	0	0	15				
734	David Chester	29 October 1972	29 October 1972	Forward	1	0	0	0	0				Signed from Orrell R.U.F.C. in September 1972
149	John Willie Chester	19 September 1908	5 April 1915	Forward	153	24	1	0	74			Lancashire	
293	Arthur Child	24 November 1923	13 February 1926	Centre	74	18	0	0	54				Welsh, career ended by a broken thigh bone. Initially played a trial for Warrington under the pseudonym Fletcher on 19 November 1923.
716	David Chisnall	20 August 1971	23 April 1984	Prop	210	29	0	0	87	©			
648	Bill Churm	17 October 1964	24 April 1968	Loose forward	37	7	0	0	21				Scored a hat-trick of tries on his début
167	Percy Clare	3 September 1910	12 December 1914	Wing/Forward	68	15	1	0	47				Made 36 appearances in 1913–14 season
1115	Daryl Clark	7 February 2015	30 September 2023	Hooker	243	51	0	0	204			Great Britain & England	Man of Steel 2014, signed from Castleford Tigers for £185,000. Début v Salford Red Devils
1148	Jason Clark	2 February 2019	3 September 2022	Loose forward	84	3	1	0	14				Australian. Début v Leeds Rhinos
658	John Clark	13 November 1965	23 December 1967	Second-row	32	3	3	0	15				
662	Ray Clark	25 March 1966	10 December 1968	Wing, Loose forward	68	8	0	0	24				Signed from Monks ARLFC
751	Ron Clark	31 March 1974	2 March 1980	Stand-off	93	9	0	1	28				Signed from Widnes RU, in 1978 team who beat Australia
798	Terry Clark	22 November 1978	22 November 1978	Forward	1	0	0	0	0				Career lasted just six minutes before an ankle injury
581	Derek 'Nobby' Clarke	10 April 1957	25 August 1958	Scrum-half	4	1	0	0	3				Became chairman of Past Players' Association
635	Doug Clarke	29 September 1962	30 November 1963	Hooker	20	1	0	0	3				Former Leigh, played in 1963 Challenge Cup semi-final
632	Fred Clarke	20 August 1962	28 March 1964	Halfback	26	6	0	0	18				Made 21 appearances in 1963–64
588	Gordon Clarke	11 January 1958	23 August 1958	Hooker	3	0	0	0	0				
38	H. Clarke	7 December 1895	11 April 1896	Halfback	11	1	0	0	3				From Warrington's rugby union days (surname with/without 'e'?)
1004	Jon Clarke	20 May 2001	30 September 2011	Hooker	263	62	2	0	252			Great Britain	Former Wigan, signed from London Broncos. Debut v Wakefield Trinity
224	Thomas Clarke	25 January 1919	5 March 1921	Forward	77	1	0	0	3				Scored his only try against Broughton Rangers at Wilderspool
717	Geoffrey Clarkson	20 August 1971	22 October 1972	Second-row	36	0	0	0	0				
232	John Clegg	15 February 1919	15 February 1919	Forward	1	0	0	0	0				Made only appearance against Oldham at Wilderspool
927	Graham Close	30 August 1995	8 September 1995	Scrum-half	3	0	0	0	0				Prolific try-scorer in Academy and Alliance teams
326	Jack Close	13 November 1926	10 April 1928	Fullback	13	0	5	0	10				Signed from Wigan Highfield
105	M. Coleman	20 December 1902	1 October 1904	Forward	15	0	0	0	0				Made 11 appearances in 1902–03 season
258	Charlie Collins	15 January 1921	9 December 1922	Centre	18	0	0	0	0				Dislocated shoulder in 1921 Lancashire Cup final victory
769	Peter Connell	16 November 1975	29 February 1976	Second-row	15	1	0	0	3				Australian, guest from Past Brothers club in Brisbane
348	Len Connolly	10 April 1928	12 September 1931	Forward	4	1	0	0	3				Signed from local ARL, made début in record defeat
317	W. Connor	12 December 1925	12 December 1925	Prop	1	0	0	0	0				Made only one appearance in 7–7 draw with Oldham
622	Tommy Conroy	21 October 1961	2 November 1975	Fullback, Utility	312	27	3	0	87				Played in 1975 Challenge Cup final
109	Tom Cook	5 September 1903	25 November 1905	Forward	75	3	0	0	9				Signed from Birkenhead (Park?) RUFC, thought to be from rugby union, so unlikely to be signed from Birkenhead Wanderers (RL), played in 1904 Challenge Cup final
821	Tony Cooke	29 August 1982	4 April 1983	Prop	273	3	0	0	9				Signed from Leigh, 1982 Lancashire Cup winner
49	… Cooper	27 February 1897	6 March 1897	Wing	3	0	0	0	0				Played in the days of broken-time payments
1068	Michael Cooper	2 April 2006	3 July 2022	Prop, Loose forward	272	22	0	0	88			England	Moved to St George Illawarra, two losing Grand Finals. Two spells with club, namely, 2006-13 & 2017-22. Debut v London Broncos in the Challenge Cup
678	Ray Corkery	23 December 1967	23 December 1967	Hooker	1	0	0	0	0				Australian had never seen snow before joining Warrington
407	Dave Cotton	2 November 1935	13 November 1948	Hooker	326	9	0	0	27				Veteran in the 1947-48 championship-winning side
673	Dave Cotton Jr.	19 August 1967	5 December 1970	Prop	24	1	0	0	3				Son of Dave Cotton, brother of rugby union legend Fran Cotton
674	John Coupe	19 August 1967	28 January 1969	Wing	68	22	3	0	72				Cumbrian, ever present in the 1967–68 season
804	Neil Courtney	26 September 1979	9 October 1983	Prop	133	4	0	0	12				Man-mountain
977	Will 'Billy Whizz' Cowell	16 August 1998	3 September 2000	Fullback	14	1	0	0	4				Signed from Kells, made début aged 18 at Halifax
281	George Cox	22 November 1922	14 April 1923	Second-row	24	0	0	0	0				Signed from Ebbw Vale RFC
190	Harry Cox	5 October 1912	24 April 1915	Forward	103	11	0	0	33				Welsh, from Treherbert (RFC?), in 1913 Challenge Cup final
1126	Jordan Cox	4 February 2016	3 September 2016	Second-row, Loose forward	27	5	0	0	0				Signed from Hull KR. Début v Leeds Rhinos
481	Martin Creeney	12 October 1946	26 April 1947	Wing, Centre	2	1	0	0	3				Scored try on début at Belle Vue Rangers
175	Matt Creevey	21 January 1911	27 March 1912	Halfback	33	9	2	0	31				Signed from St Helens , died aged 61 in January 1948 Catherine Grady
801	Ian Critchley	13 May 1979	13 May 1979	Halfback	1	0	0	0	0				Signed from Blackbrook ARLFC
186	J. E. Critchley	5 April 1912	13 February 1915	Forward	21	0	5	0	10				
865	Martin Crompton	8 February 1987	29 April 1992	Stand-off	81	21	0	2	86				Played in 1990 Challenge Cup final team
1132	Dom Crosby	11 February 2017	6 July 2018	Prop	17	0	0	0	0				Début v Catalans Dragons
590	Gordon Crosby	15 March 1958	20 August 1958	Prop	10	1	0	0	3				Scored his only try against Liverpool City at Wilderspool
33	George Cross	7 October 1895	18 February 1899	Centre	84	9	2	4	47				Joined in 1893 when Stockton Heath RUFC (Warrington suburb) disbanded
1010	Kevin Crouthers	26 August 2001	21 April 2003	Centre	14	4	0	0	16				Signed from Dewsbury Rams by coach Steve Anderson
1198	Jordan Crowther	4 August 2023	present	Hooker, Loose forward	20	2	0	0	8				Début v Catalans Dragons
418	Francisco "Frank" Cueto	31 October 1936	7 September 1940	Scrum-half	79	10	0	0	30				Signed from Stockton Heath, killed in February 1944 during the Second World War when his fighter plane went down in the English Channel
814	Paul Cullen	16 August 1981	26 August 1996	Centre, Stand-off, Second-row, Loose forward	350	56	0	0	217				Coach, Mr. Warrington
211	Billy Cunliffe	17 October 1914	6 September 1930	Prop	438	38	6	0	126				
718	Dave Cunliffe	20 August 1971	28 September 1977	Fullback, Centre	106	19	0	0	57				Signed from Bold Hornets, 1977 Premiership finalist
213	Tom Cunliffe	19 December 1914	24 November 1928	Forward	324	48	0	0	144				Billy Cunliffe's younger brother, joint testimonial in 1927–28
74	J. Cunningham	25 March 1899	10 January 1903	Forward	34	0	0	0	0				Played in Warrington's first Challenge Cup final in 1901
796	Tommy Cunningham	1 October 1978	28 February 1982	Hooker	30	6	0	0	18				Signed from St Helens , in 1978 team who beat Australia
729	Dennis Curling	20 August 1972	28 May 1977	Wing	132	35	0	0	105				
1101	Ben Currie	5 April 2012	present	Second-row	320	102	0	0	408			England & Ireland	Signed from Parkside Golborne ARLFC. Début v Widnes Vikings
924	Andy Currier	20 August 1995	21 March 1997	Centre	19	7	0	0	28				Former Widnes and Great Britain signed from Featherstone
1135	Will Dagger	11 June 2017	1 July 2017	Fullback, Wing, Stand-off	4	0	0	0	0				Début v Castleford Tigers
145	Jim 'Shint' Daintith	8 February 1908	16 March 1921	Scrum-half	155	12	7	2	54				Warrington-born, played in 1913 Challenge Cup final team.
819	Gary Dainty	9 May 1982	9 May 1982	Halfback	1	0	0	0	0				Signed from Orrell R.U.F.C., joined Mansfield Marksman in June 1984
7	J. Dakin	7 September 1895	11 January 1902	Forward	79	7	0	0	21				Played in first game at Wilderspool in September 1898
792	John Dalgreen	1 October 1977	24 August 1980	Hooker	50	9	0	1	28				
783	Rex Dalzell	10 October 1976	10 October 1976	Second-row, Loose forward	1	0	0	0	0				Guest from New Zealand club Linwood
250	S. H. Daniel	28 August 1920	28 August 1920	Wing	1	0	0	0	0				Left wing on the opening day of the 1920–21 season
888	Paul Darbyshire	19 March 1989	11 May 1997	Centre	106	9	12	0	60				In 1990 Challenge Cup final team, joined coaching staff
880	Les Davidson	11 September 1988	14 February 1989	Second-row	22	4	0	0	16				
253	D. Davies	18 September 1920	18 September 1920	Stand-off	1	0	0	0	0				Only appearance in a 6–26 defeat at St Helens
110	Dai Davies	5 September 1903	29 April 1905	Scrum-half	61	17	0	1	53				Played in Warrington's first Challenge Cup win in 1905
342	Dai Davies	26 November 1927	3 November 1934	Scrum-half	196	34	0	0	102				
242	Fred Davies	10 January 1920	3 April 1920	Stand-off, Loose forward	4	0	0	0	0				
931	Gareth Davies	20 September 1995	6 April 1997	Centre, Second-row, Loose forward	16	3	0	0	12			2 Wales caps in 1996, plus 2 matches for Wales against the United States	
243	Horald Davies	10 January 1920	5 April 1920	Halfback	6	1	0	0	6				Served in South Lancashire regiment during World War I
462	Ivor Davies	8 September 1945	16 April 1949	Halfback	37	9	1	0	29				Signed from Ystradgynlais RFC, transferred to Keighley
421	Islwyn Davies	17 March 1937	26 December 1939	Wing	69	57	0	0	171				
124	Jack Davies	19 November 1904	29 March 1907	Halfback	23	1	0	1	5				Signed from Penygraig RFC
911	Jonathan 'Jiffy' Davies	29 August 1993	24 September 1995	Centre	66	43	232	26	662				
335	Ponty Davies	10 September 1927	17 November 1928	Second-row	39	0	0	0	0				
610	Tony Davies	23 April 1960	15 April 1966	Prop	45	1	0	0	3				Signed from Rylands, transferred to Leigh (1966–67)
1152	Matt Davis	5 April 2019	3 July 2022	Second-row, Loose forward	61	5	0	0	20				Début v London Broncos. Joined Leigh Leopards
196	Howard Davis	25 December 1912	2 January 1915	Wing, Centre	22	1	0	0	6				Signed from Coventry, killed in action in World War I
373	J. Dawson	19 December 1931	5 March 1932	Second-row	13	3	0	0	9				Signed from Balmoral RUFC (in Ormskirk)
485	Bryn Day	8 February 1947	30 August 1947	Loose forward	18	4	0	0	12				
561	Derek Day	20 August 1955	17 September 1955	Left wing	2	1	0	0	3				Signed from Belle Vue Rangers, try-scoring début at Halifax
835	Terry Day	21 September 1983	4 December 1983	Centre	12	1	0	0	4				Yorkshire player signed on season-long loan from Hull
416	Mel De Lloyd	26 September 1936	4 October 1947	Stand-off	176	24	27	7	140				
1155	Riley Dean	8 August 2019	26 May 2023	Stand-off, Scrum-half	10	3	5	0	22				Début v St Helens
615	Henry Delooze	21 January 1961	18 September 1965	Forward	53	8	17	0	58				Signed from Latchford Albion, moved to Barrow
355	Harry Dennett	13 March 1929	22 November 1930	Wing, Centre	6	0	0	0	0				
486	Billy Derbyshire	30 August 1947	29 August 1951	Prop	165	17	0	0	51				
950	Martin Dermott	23 February 1997	14 March 1997	Hooker	3	1	0	1	5				Wigan and Great Britain, quickly released by Warrington (★)
846	Steve Diamond	18 November 1984	1 January 1985	Fullback	5	0	5	1	11				Controversially signed by Reg Bowden from Fulham, as the RFL deemed him a free-agent
608	Martin Dickens	20 February 1960	16 October 1965	Hooker	125	14	0	0	42				Signed from Leigh, moved on to Blackpool Borough
711	Tommy Dickens	13 March 1971	23 April 1972	Hooker	16	0	0	0	0				Signed from Leigh, played in 1972 Challenge Cup semi-final
85	George Dickenson	27 October 1900	18 March 1914	Centre	375	94	9	5	310			Great Britain, England & Lancashire	
290	Jim Dickenson	3 September 1923	16 April 1928	Halfback	19	1	0	0	3				Signed from local ARL, only try in record defeat at Hunslet RLFC
376	Vincent Dilorenzo	19 March 1932	16 March 1940	Hooker	18	0	0	0	0				
346	Ben Dingsdale	3 March 1928	24 November 1928	Wing, Centre	9	0	0	0	0				Billy Dingsdale's brother
351	Billy Dingsdale	15 September 1928	18 May 1940	Centre	373	154	4	0	470				
438	Eli Dixon	26 August 1939	21 September 1946	Centre, Stand-off	41	25	11	1	99				Signed from St Helens Recs
1128	Mitchell Dodds	3 March 2016	12 March 2016	Prop	2	0	0	0	0				Australian. Début v Salford Red Devils
704	Joe Doherty	26 December 1970	5 April 1972	Forward	16	1	0	0	3				Signed from Crosfields, moved on to Widnes
1019	'Super' Sid Domic	10 February 2002	27 September 2003	Centre	48	17	0	0	68				Signed from Penrith Panthers, player of Year in 2002
617	Peter Donoghue	26 August 1961	4 September 1965	Forward	59	6	1	0	20				Versatile and hard-working, signed from Salford
295	Jerry Donovan	1 December 1923	8 September 1924	Scrum-half	30	5	0	2	19				Signed from Oldham for £300, sold to Keighley
1166	Eribe Doro	10 September 2020	11 September 2021	Prop	4	1	0	0	4				Début v Castleford Tigers. Joined Halifax Panthers
193	J. Douglas	2 November 1912	17 January 1914	Scrum-half	5	0	1	0	2				Kicked a goal against Hull at Wilderspool
353	Tommy Dover	24 November 1928	12 December 1931	Forward	12	0	0	0	0				
151	William Dowell	26 September 1908	27 February 1909	Forward	22	0	0	0	0				Signed from Pontypool RFC, having previously played for Newport RFC
378	Harry Downes	27 August 1932	3 September 1932	Centre	2	0	0	0	0				Signed from Leigh (20 appearances from 1930 to 1932)
964	Adam Doyle	15 February 1998	16 August 1998	Stand-off	14	6	0	0	24				Pedestrian player signed from Western Suburbs
1192	Josh Drinkwater	16 February 2023	4 October 2024	Stand-off, Scrum-half	50	5	10	0	40				Australian. Début v Leeds Rhinos
866	Des Drummond	8 February 1987	26 April 1992	Wing	182	69	0	0	276	©			Elastic, 2 Great Britain caps while at Warrington, Regal Trophy winning captain
727	Toby Du Toit	19 December 1971	5 November 1972	Wing	30	15	27	0	99				Only South African to play for Warrington
799	Ian Duane	10 December 1978	21 April 1985	Centre	120	15	0	0	51				Older brother of Ronnie Duane, signed from Woolston Rovers
817	Ronnie 'Rhino' Duane	11 October 1981	24 October 1989	Centre	173	51	28	0	246				Younger brother of Ian Duane
51	Jack Duckworth	2 October 1897	31 December 1904	Unknown	104	10	0	1	32				1901 Challenge Cup final, Uncle of England cricketer George Duckworth
1195	Gil Dudson	24 March 2023	17 February 2024	Prop	17	0	0	0	0				Début v Castleford Tigers. Joined Oldham RLFC
900	Don 'Mad Dog' Duffy	30 September 1990	20 April 1992	Forward	13	0	0	0	0				Australian
952	John Duffy	21 March 1997	12 September 1999	Scrum-half	25	0	0	0	0				
1185	Matt Dufty	30 July 2022	18 September 2025	Fullback	88	47	0	0	188				Australian. Début v Huddersfield Giants
215	Jack Dumbell	18 January 1919	18 January 1919	Forward	1	0	0	0	0				Signed from Rylands
962	Andrew Duncan	18 July 1997	10 August 1997	Wing	4	0	0	0	0				Signed on loan from London Broncos, squad No.45
1038	Jamie Durbin	3 August 2003	14 March 2004	Halfback	3	1	0	0	4				Signed from Halton Hornets aged-12
908	Mark Dusher	1 January 1992	1 January 1992	Centre	1	0	0	0	0				Signed from Hull Boys, played for Great Britain Academy
1100	Brad Dwyer	18 May 2012	23 September 2017	Hooker	88	16	0	0	64				Signed from Ince St William. Two spells, namely 2012-17 & 2024 (no 1st team games though for this 2nd spell, due to being loaned to Leigh Leopards). Début v Wakefield Trinity
965	Michael Eagar	15 February 1998	27 September 1998	Centre	23	6	0	0	24				Australian from Queensland Crushers, joined Castleford
752	John Earle	31 March 1974	11 May 1977	Prop	3	0	0	0	0				
791	Bob Eccles	14 September 1977	17 May 1987	Second-row	291	119	30	8	469				Warrington's record try-scoring forward
932	Chris Eckersley	1 November 1995	9 June 1996	Wing	8	4	0	0	16				Signed from Warrington Academy, moved to Oldham
55	John Eden	1 January 1898	25 October 1902	Forward	96	10	0	0	30				Played in Warrington's first Challenge Cup final in 1901
422	Alf Edge	30 March 1937	23 March 1940	Prop	46	1	0	0	3				Only try against Broughton, played for Leigh (1948–49)
234	Will Edlestone	22 February 1919	22 February 1919	Right-Centre	1	0	0	0	0				Only appearance at St Helens Recs
88	Jim Edmondson	26 January 1901	30 April 1904	Forward	112	1	0	0	3				Played in Warrington's first two Challenge Cup finals in 1901 & 1904
97	D. H. Edmunds	15 February 1902	7 November 1903	Halfback	33	1	0	1	5				Welsh, known as Little Tich because he was 5 ft tall
92	… Edwards	12 October 1901	7 December 1901	Forward	2	0	0	0	0				
620	Bobby Edwards	23 September 1961	23 September 1961	Halfback	1	0	0	0	0				Brother of Jackie Edwards, uncle of Wigan legend Shaun Edwards, only appearance against New Zealand
431	J. Edwards	24 December 1938	4 November 1939	Forward	6	0	0	0	0				
566	Jackie Edwards	9 November 1955	4 January 1964	Scrum-half	223	78	2	0	238				Brother of Bobby Edwards, father of Wigan legend Shaun Edwards, début aged 16 (born c. 1939)
283	T. Edwards (trialist)	16 December 1922	16 December 1922	Centre	1	0	0	0	0				Pseudonym for a Welsh trialist against Leeds
906	David Elliott	14 April 1991	12 May 1995	Forward	36	2	0	0	8				Signed from Kells, career ended by broken leg
903	Kevin Ellis	7 October 1990	18 September 1994	Scrum-half	123	35	0	3	143				Feisty
602	P. Ellis	19 August 1959	19 August 1959	Second-row	1	0	0	0	0				Only appearance against Liverpool City
1110	Anthony England	21 February 2014	7 August 2015	Prop	39	3	0	0	12				Former Castleford, signed from Featherstone. Début v Leeds Rhinos
370	Arthur 'Candy' Evans	26 September 1931	10 November 1934	Second-row	109	21	0	0	63			Wales & Glamorgan County	Giant Welsh
1108	Ben Evans	13 February 2014	19 March 2015	Prop	22	2	0	0	8			Wales	Twin brother of Rhys Evans, Wales, spent 2013 on loan at Bradford Bulls. Début v St Helens
23	John Willie Evans	28 September 1895	25 April 1896	Fullback	6	0	0	0	0				
117	John Evans	13 February 1904	13 February 1904	Halfback	1	0	0	0	0				Signed from Pendlebury
1093	Rhys Evans	3 September 2010	5 May 2017	Centre	105	45	1	0	182			Wales	Bridgend-born, made début at Harlequins RL aged 17
352	Stanley Evans	20 October 1928	25 October 1928	Wing	2	0	0	0	0				Signed from the Rastrick ARLFC in Halifax League
960	Richard Eyres	6 July 1997	5 September 1997	Second-row, Loose forward	8	0	0	0	0				Former Widnes & Great Britain, came on loan from Leeds
1055	Henry Fa'afili	8 August 2004	14 September 2007	Wing	97	73	0	0	292				New Zealand international, signed from New Zealand Warriors
460	Brian Fairclough	1 September 1945	28 September 1946	Scrum-half	9	1	0	0	3				Reserve scrum-half, transferred to Salford in Oct 1946
24	John Fairhurst	28 September 1895	29 March 1907	Forward	139	4	1	0	14				Played in the first match at Wilderspool
212	Jonathan Fairhurst	28 November 1914	6 April 1915	Forward	6	0	0	0	0				
795	Jimmy Fairhurst	15 January 1978	4 May 1981	Scrum-half	54	15	1	1	48				Moved to Blackpool Borough in July 1981
159	W. Fairhurst	10 April 1909	10 April 1909	Forward	1	0	0	0	0				Only appearance in a 15–15 draw with Salford
966	Danny Farrar	15 February 1998	17 September 2000	Hooker	85	16	0	0	64	©			Signed from Penrith Panthers, captain in 1998
488	Terrance Farrington	13 September 1947	6 December 1947	Stand-off	3	1	0	0	3				Scored his only try in a 43–7 victory at Featherstone
967	Vince Fawcett	15 February 1998	6 September 1998	Centre	13	2	0	0	8				Signed from Oldham Bears and later sacked for missing training sessions and a match against Halifax, former Leeds Rhinos
182	Jim 'Skuddy' Fearnley	2 December 1911	1 November 1924	Forward	204	39	0	1	119				Played in 1913 Challenge Cup final, testimonial 1925–26
227	William Fearnley	1 February 1919	1 February 1919	Wing	1	0	0	0	0				Made only appearance in a 3–8 defeat at St Helens
473	Jim Featherstone	5 January 1946	21 February 1953	Second-row	240	47	2	1	147				
89	Tom Fell	26 January 1901	22 March 1902	Forward	36	2	0	0	6				Played in Warrington's first Challenge Cup final, Emigrated to South Africa
811	Paul Fellows	29 March 1981	14 April 1985	Wing	25	10	0	0	33				Try scorer in 1982 Lancashire Cup triumph
1020	Leon Felton	10 February 2002	3 August 2002	Fullback	8	0	0	0	0				
803	John Fieldhouse	2 September 1979	6 January 1985	Second-row	125	16	0	0	56				
116	W. Fielding	30 January 1904	6 February 1904	Forward	2	0	0	0	0				Welsh, signed from Pontnewydd RFC (or possibly Cwmbran RFC as they are/were located in Pontnewydd) January 1904
937	Salesi Finau	20 December 1995	5 September 1997	Centre	46	11	0	0	44				Tongan, from Canberra, played in 1995 World Cup
978	Phil Finney	18 September 1998	18 September 1998	Scrum-half	1	0	0	0	0				Signed from Widnes Tigers in January 1998
743	Derek Finnigan	19 August 1973	23 April 1984	Fullback	258	34	0	0	102				Signed from Moore RUFC (in Warrington), in the 1978 team who beat Australia
65	Jack Fish	22 October 1898	18 February 1911	Wing	321	215	257	5	1169			England & Lancashire	
630	Idwal Fisher	24 March 1962	14 December 1963	Forward	47	5	0	0	15				
358	John Fisher	7 December 1929	25 December 1929	Hooker	5	0	0	0	0				Played in 1929 victory over Australia, moved to Swinton
600	John Fisher	15 August 1959	13 August 1960	Halfback	13	2	0	0	6				Moved to Swinton
641	Ray Fisher	26 October 1963	20 August 1966	Wing	91	19	0	0	57				Try scorer in 1965 Lancashire Cup final win
512	Ron Fisher	31 December 1949	27 October 1951	Prop	37	2	0	0	6				Played in 1950 Challenge Cup win, joined Blackpool Borough
499	Harold 'Ike' Fishwick	27 November 1948	17 April 1954	Hooker	208	32	0	0	96				Signed for record fee from St Helens , 1950 Challenge Cup winner (Harold Fishwick?) (born c. 1922), uncle of Harry Pinner
1199	Lachlan Fitzgibbon	17 February 2024	13 September 2025	Second-row	41	2	0	0	8				Australian. Début v Catalans Dragons
759	Gerry Fitzpatrick	3 November 1974	10 January 1975	Centre	6	0	0	0	0				Guest from Fortitude Valley club in Queensland
443	J. Flanagan	23 March 1940	13 May 1940	Wing, Stand-off	2	0	0	0	0				Played at Widnes and Wigan, both lost
408	Mick Flannery	2 November 1935	19 September 1936	Second-row	31	0	8	0	16				Signed from Leigh, played in 1936 Challenge Cup final
700	Bob Fleet	21 August 1970	26 November 1971	Centre	52	8	0	0	24				Signed from Swinton, moved to Leigh
484	Jackie Fleming	1 February 1947	26 December 1949	Stand-off	104	26	0	0	78				
776	Gary Fletcher	19 September 1976	22 April 1978	Second-row	8	0	0	0	0				Signed from Blackbrook ARLFC
777	Larry Flood	19 September 1976	19 September 1976	Centre	1	0	0	0	0				Played in weakened side who pulled off shock win at Rochdale
433	Gwynne Floyd	21 January 1939	22 April 1939	Centre	11	5	0	0	15				Signed from Maesteg RFC
318	Tommy Flynn	12 December 1925	20 April 1932	Stand-off	224	73	42	7	317				
8	J. Foden	7 September 1895	3 October 1896	Stand-off	14	3	1	1	15				Scored Warrington's first try as a Northern Union (RL) club
973	Adam Fogerty	5 April 1998	26 April 1998	Prop	4	0	0	0	0				
683	Allie Ford	5 October 1968	5 October 1968	Wing	1	0	0	0	0				Signed on loan from Huddersfield
933	Mike Ford	1 November 1995	8 April 1996	Scrum-half	18	4	1	1	19				Former Castleford, signed from Queensland Crushers
810	Paul Ford	1 February 1981	19 January 1987	Fullback	95	5	65	7	153				Signed from Widnes RU Club, 1986 Premiership winner
809	Phil Ford	11 January 1981	20 January 1985	Wing	112	57	3	0	201				Unorthodox Welsh player sold to Wigan for record £40,000
405	Bill Forrest	31 August 1935	26 October 1935	Hooker	4	0	0	0	0				Lost his place in the team to Dave Cotton
1051	Mike Forshaw	21 February 2004	17 September 2004	Loose forward	23	6	0	0	24				GB, signed from Bradford, dedicated trainer
34	H. Forster	7 October 1895	21 December 1895	Wing	4	1	0	0	3				Scored his only try at Wilderspool to Broughton Rangers
95	Harry Forster	4 January 1902	8 February 1908	Forward	49	6	1	0	20				Made 29 appearances in 1902–03 season
826	Mark Forster	16 January 1983	17 September 2000	Wing	458	191	3	0	769				Signed from Woolston Rovers
437	W. Forsyth	29 April 1939	29 April 1939	Hooker	1	0	0	0	0				Played against Oldham on last day of the 1938–39 season
216	… Foster	18 January 1919	25 January 1919	Wing	2	0	0	0	0				Played in games at Widnes and Wigan, played two, lost two
112	J. Foster	19 September 1903	17 October 1903	Left wing	5	0	0	0	0				Made début in a 9–0 defeat at Batley
246	Arthur 'Farmer' Fowles	13 March 1920	30 September 1922	Fullback	35	0	51	0	102				Could kick ball huge distances
446	J. Fox	7 September 1940	28 December 1940	Second-row	10	0	0	0	0				Played in the War Emergency League
1026	Nick Fozzard	3 March 2002	27 September 2003	Prop	55	2	0	0	8				Former Huddersfield, relaunched his career at Warrington
778	Glen France	19 September 1976	17 February 1980	Scrum-half	8	4	3	0	18				
495	Roy Francis	21 August 1948	22 October 1949	Wing	37	27	0	0	81				
532	Eric Fraser	27 October 1951	28 November 1964	Fullback	352	50	473	0	1096	©			
162	Dan Frawley	23 October 1909	25 March 1910	Centre	19	8	2	0	28				
411	Freddie French	30 November 1935	30 November 1935	Fullback	1	0	0	0	0				
412	B. Friend	28 December 1935	13 April 1936	Hooker	2	0	0	0	0				
496	Eric Frodsham	4 September 1948	9 April 1956	Fullback	226	19	34	0	125	©			
758	Peter Frodsham	26 August 1974	10 November 1974	Second-row	5	0	0	0	0				Signed on loan from Salford
556	Billy Frost	18 September 1954	25 September 1954	Hooker	2	0	0	0	0				
301	Arthur Frowen	6 September 1924	1 October 1932	Fullback	183	12	8	3	58				Ferocious tackler, played in 1928 Challenge Cup final
573	Arthur Fryer	27 October 1956	31 January 1959	Loose forward	29	1	4	0	11				Signed from Cadishead and Irlam RLFC (in Salford)
695	Bob Fulton	10 October 1969	8 February 1970	Stand-off	16	16	0	1	50				
304	Tom Gabriel	29 November 1924	31 January 1925	Fullback, Centre	3	0	0	0	0				
577	Maurice Gallagher	16 February 1957	18 October 1958	Prop	44	3	0	0	9				
217	J. U. Gallop	18 January 1919	3 May 1919	Scrum-half	4	1	0	0	3				Scored his only try against Oldham at Wilderspool
108	Richard "Dick" Gallop	24 March 1903	27 April 1904	Forward	4	0	0	0	0				Transferred to Leigh in 1907, made 160 appearances there
790	Chris Ganley	21 August 1977	28 September 1980	Fullback	16	3	0	0	9				Joined Fulham in their first season
539	Max Garbler	11 October 1952	15 November 1952	Loose forward	4	0	0	0	0				Australian who played four trial matches
1216	Zack Gardner	18 May 2025	present	Centre	4	2	0	0	8				Son of Ade Gardner. Made his début against Wakefield Trinity
371	Jack Garratt	28 November 1931	5 October 1940	Wing	193	77	0	0	231				Warrington-born, played in 1936 Challenge Cup final. father of Wilf Garratt brother of Harry Garratt
571	Wilf Garratt	20 October 1956	22 November 1958	Wing	7	1	0	0	3				Reserve player, son of Jack Garratt, nephew of Harry Garratt
415	Harry Garratt	16 September 1936	19 September 1936	Stand-off	2	0	0	0	0				? brother of Jack Garratt (rugby league), uncle of Wilf Garratt
126	C. Garside	7 October 1905	9 October 1905	Stand-off	2	0	0	0	0				
1036	Dean Gaskell	3 August 2002	17 July 2005	Wing	63	12	0	0	48				Signed from Wigan Academy
699	Jim Gaskell	12 April 1970	1 April 1973	Centre, Second-row	15	2	0	0	6				Signed from Leigh Miners
582	Josh Gaskell	31 August 1957	28 February 1959	Second-row	61	4	0	0	12				16st 9lb, signed from St Helens
741	Wayne Gaskell	23 April 1973	16 February 1975	Second-row	32	1	0	0	3				Signed from Woolston Rovers
319	Reg Gautrey	16 January 1926	11 September 1926	Centre	11	2	0	0	6				Signed from Rugby Lions (RU)
987	Andrew Gee	13 February 2000	13 May 2001	Prop	40	4	0	0	16				Giant from Brisbane Broncos, troubled by shoulder injury
1159	Anthony Gelling	30 January 2020	12 November 2020	Centre, Wing, Second-row	13	7	0	0	28			Cook Islands	
1000	Steve Georgallis	11 February 2001	16 April 2001	Utility	10	2	0	0	8				Australian player, ruptured an Achilles tendon
957	Shaun Geritas	18 May 1997	27 June 1997	Stand-off, Loose forward	8	2	0	0	8				Signed from Woolston Rovers, joined Leigh
165	Knox Gibbs	25 March 1910	6 January 1912	Forward	2	0	0	0	0				Made début against Halifax at Wilderspool
247	David Gibson	20 March 1920	20 March 1920	Centre	1	0	0	0	0				Made only appearance in a 14–12 defeat at Salford
1122	Kurt Gidley	4 February 2016	23 September 2017	Stand-off	55	14	115	0	286				Veteran signed from Newcastle Knights. Début v Leeds Rhinos
228	Reg Gifford	1 February 1919	11 September 1920	Left-Centre	12	2	0	0	6				
533	Laurie Gilfedder	1 December 1951	1 June 1963	Wing, Centre/Forward	283	96	426	0	1140				
981	Simon Gillies	14 February 1999	12 September 1999	Second-row	31	6	0	0	24	©			Signed from Canterbury, appointed captain in May 1999
815	Tom Gittins	16 August 1981	27 April 1986	Second-row	64	4	0	0	14				Signed from Leigh, moved on to Wakefield Trinity
820	Mark Gleave	9 May 1982	19 October 1986	Prop	14	0	0	0	0				Prop signed as a teenager from Thatto Heath in April 1981 (born c. 1962…1965 birth registered April→Jun 1962 in Prescot district?)
996	Mark Gleeson	25 August 2000	15 June 2008	Hooker	163	15	0	0	60				Quick at play-the-ball, often used off the bench. Brother of Martin Gleeson
1056	Martin Gleeson	13 February 2005	29 March 2009	Centre	117	48	0	0	192				Great Britain international, signed from St Helens for a record fee. Brother of Mark Gleeson
584	Brian Glover	14 September 1957	3 April 1970	Wing	333	130	0	0	390				Discovered by Albert Johnson
562	Jim Glover	8 October 1955	1 December 1956	Loose forward	7	1	0	0	3				Scored a try on his début at Barrow
564	Roy Glover	22 October 1955	1 January 1957	Second-row	6	1	0	0	3				Signed from West Bank ARLFC
396	Jack Goodall	10 October 1934	28 December 1940	Scrum-half	146	22	0	2	70				Played in 3 major finals (1935, 36 & 37), all were lost
1138	Bryson Goodwin	1 February 2018	19 September 2019	Centre, Wing	61	26	43	0	190				Australian. Début v Leeds Rhinos
642	Parry Gordon	26 October 1963	13 September 1981	Scrum-half	543	167	0	1	503	©			
489	Billy Gore	27 September 1947	27 September 1947	Hooker	1	0	0	0	0				
218	Thomas Gormley	18 January 1919	5 April 1919	Wing	12	1	0	0	3				Made a try-scoring début at Widnes
430	J. Goulden	23 April 1938	19 November 1938	Hooker	3	0	0	0	0				
1041	Mike Govin	26 October 2003	26 October 2003	Loose forward	1	1	0	0	4				Signed from Leigh Miners, in last match at Wilderspool
783	Tom Grainey	3 October 1976	3 October 1976	Unknown	1	0	0	0	0				Alex Murphy's assistant coach, played during an injury crisis
739	John Grant	3 December 1972	21 March 1973	Centre	10	4	0	0	12				Bearded
504	H. Gray	5 February 1949	5 March 1949	Prop	5	0	0	0	0				Signed from Liverpool Stanley
170	F. Green	10 September 1910	1 October 1910	Forward	5	0	0	0	0				Signed from Ince ARLFC
322	Jack Green	30 August 1926	14 January 1928	Centre	41	7	0	0	21				Sold to Broughton Rangers
773	Kenny Green	1 January 1976	18 January 1976	Scrum-half	4	0	0	0	0				Signed on loan from Swinton because of injuries
199	Mark Green	6 September 1913	13 September 1919	Forward	53	2	0	0	6			Won one cap for Lancashire in the 1915–16 season	
1197	Lucas Green	14 April 2023	1 June 2024	Second-row	7	0	0	0	0				
530	Derek Greenhalgh	22 September 1951	13 September 1952	Fullback	3	1	4	0	11				Signed from Wigan & District ARL
587	Bobby Greenough	14 December 1957	30 April 1966	Stand-off	232	136	0	0	408				
469	Albert Gregory	13 October 1945	6 December 1947	Fullback, Wing	23	7	0	0	21				Signed from Broughton Rangers
851	Andy Gregory	3 February 1985	30 November 1986	Scrum-half	60	11	4	1	53				1 Great Britain cap while at Warrington, sold to Wigan for record £130,000
686	Brian Gregory	14 January 1969	11 November 1973	Second-row	128	23	0	0	69				
884	Damian Gregory	16 October 1988	16 October 1988	Unknown	1	0	0	0	0				Made a substitute appearance against France at Wilderspool
428	Francis Gregory	5 February 1938	2 March 1946	Forward	79	6	0	0	18				
822	Mike Gregory	5 September 1982	12 February 1994	Loose forward	246	45	0	0	176	©			
389	Tom Griffin	3 March 1934	10 January 1934	Loose forward	15	2	0	0	6				
260	H. Griffith	5 March 1921	5 March 1921	Stand-off	1	0	0	0	0				Played in a 0–15 defeat by Halifax at Wilderspool
374	J. Griffith	25 December 1931	16 December 1933	Prop	18	1	0	0	3				Signed from Pleasley Cross ARLFC (near St. Helens)
359	J. B. Griffiths	21 December 1929	14 April 1930	Stand-off	10	1	0	0	3				Signed from Cardiff RFC (stand-off), début in famous victory over Australia
1069	Simon Grix	2 April 2006	4 September 2014	Centre, Stand-off, Second-row	179	48	0	0	192			Ireland	Signed from Halifax RLFC, two losing Grand Finals
1037	Brent Grose	8 February 2003	14 September 2007	Centre	146	62	0	0	252				Quality Australian signed from South Sydney Rabbitohs
230	Syd Grounds	8 February 1919	8 February 1919	Wing	1	1	0	0	3				Discovered playing for Warrington butchers in 1913
1042	Tommy Grundy	26 October 2003	26 October 2003	Second-row	1	1	0	0	4				Signed from Leigh Miners, in last game at Wilderspool
988	Jérôme Guisset	13 February 2000	17 September 2004	Forward	137	25	0	0	100			France	First Frenchman to play for Warrington (second was Benjamin Jullien)
774	Alan Gwilliam	25 January 1976	25 April 1982	Scrum-half	136	18	0	1	55				His try beat Australia in famous victory of 1978
400	Ben Halfpenny	26 January 1935	16 February 1935	Prop, Second-row	5	1	0	0	3				
54	Jack Hallam	25 December 1897	25 November 1905	Fullback	217	3	8	1	27	©			First Warrington captain to lift the 1904–05 Challenge Cup
1028	Danny Halliwell	12 May 2002	21 July 2002	Wing	10	8	0	0	32				Scored some important tries, grandson of Ken Halliwell ★
690	Ken Halliwell	15 August 1969	18 April 1971	Prop	70	6	0	5	28	©			Signed from Salford, grandfather of Danny Halliwell ★
831	Peter Halpin	10 April 1983	10 April 1983	Wing, Centre	1	0	0	0	0				Signed from Halton Hornets. substitute in 9–9 draw at Hull KR
409	J. Halsall	23 November 1935	14 March 1936	Centre	3	0	0	0	0				Played three, lost three
983	Dean Hanger	28 February 1999	20 August 1999	Wing	20	3	0	0	12				Pint-sized Australian (5 ft 9in) signed from Huddersfield.
280	M. Hanley	7 October 1922	21 October 1922	Stand-off	3	0	0	0	0				Features in Pinnacle cigarette card collection
598	Kevin Hansen	11 April 1959	12 September 1959	Centre	4	0	0	0	0				Product of school and local amateur rugby league
349	Sammy Hardman	10 April 1928	29 January 1938	Prop	200	7	0	0	21				Played in 1933 and 1936 Challenge Cup finals, testimonial 1937–38
368	Bill 'Nelson' Hardy	29 August 1931	26 December 1933	Centre	38	5	0	0	15				
103	Bill Harmer	29 November 1902	24 April 1915	Forward	187	15	2	0	49				Played in Warrington's first Challenge Cup-winning team in 1905
863	Neil Harmon	19 October 1986	25 April 1993	Prop	147	14	0	0	56				Played in 1990 Challenge Cup Final at Wembley, 1991 Regal Trophy winner
579	Bill Harper	2 March 1957	15 December 1962	Hooker	43	4	0	0	12				Played in 1961 Championship final, emigrated to Australia
672	Dave Harries	8 February 1967	18 February 1967	Wing	3	0	0	0	0				On a month's trial from Swinton
147	W. Harries	12 September 1908	12 September 1908	Wing	1	0	0	0	0				Signed from Blaenavon RFC
66	Elliott Harris	19 November 1898	22 September 1906	Wing	172	59	1	0	179				Played in Warrington's first two Challenge Cup finals, 1901 and 1904.
913	Iestyn Harris	29 October 1993	8 March 1997	Stand-off	92	37	182	4	516				5 Great Britain caps while at Warrington, 1996 Great Britain tour
1070	Ben Harrison	2 April 2006	24 September 2015	Prop, Second-row	221	19	0	0	76			England & Ireland	Signed from Barrow Island, three Challenge Cups
669	Dave Harrison	18 November 1966	7 November 1971	Hooker	78	6	0	0	18				Signed from Halifax, Lancashire League title winner in 1967–68
474	H. Harrison	26 January 1946	23 March 1946	Halfback	4	1	0	0	3				
1181	James Harrison	24 June 2022	present	Second-row	52	12	0	0	48			England	
309	Bill Harrop	26 January 1925	30 April 1927	Prop	80	2	0	0	6				Signed from Devonport Services R.F.C.
779	Colin Hart	19 September 1976	27 December 1976	Scrum-half	6	0	0	0	0				
732	John Hart	30 September 1972	6 May 1973	Wing	27	9	0	0	27				Long-haired player, signed from Bold Heath club in St Helens
1208	Ben Hartill	1 June 2024	present	Hooker	5	1	0	0	4				
129	Joe Hartley	2 December 1905	2 December 1905	Forward	1	0	0	0	0				Cumberland, signed from Bradford Northern, sent off on début
676	Peter Harvey	6 September 1967	19 April 1969	Stand-off	68	7	0	5	31				Signed from St Helens , Warrington coach 1970–71
266	Arthur Hassall	3 September 1921	7 January 1922	Wing	4	0	0	0	0				Product of Warrington's 'A' team
57	… Hatton	12 March 1898	27 January 1900	Forward	10	0	0	0	0				
385	Ben Hawker	30 December 1933	17 December 1938	Centre	88	30	0	0	90				Welsh, played in 1936 Challenge Cup final, later murdered his wife
621	Bill Hayes	23 September 1961	30 April 1966	Loose forward	90	11	14	0	61				Signed from Orford Tannery, 1965 Lancashire Cup winner
589	Jack Hayes	25 January 1958	29 March 1958	Hooker	9	0	0	0	0				Former Lancashire player, signed from Widnes, uncle of Bill Hayes
1189	Leon Hayes	29 August 2022	present	Scrum-half, Hooker	16	1	6	0	16				Début v Huddersfield Giants
238	Joe Haywood	6 September 1919	24 April 1920	Wing	22	3	0	0	9				Signed from Manchester United F.C., sold to Widnes, occasionally misnamed as Jack Haywood
410	Roy Hazelhurst	23 November 1935	22 April 1936	Fullback, Stand-off	10	0	0	0	0				Signed from Canterbury RU, New Zealand
712	George Heard	6 August 1971	6 May 1973	Hooker	39	2	0	0	6				Signed from United Glassblowers ARLFC (in St Helens)
127	George Heath	25 November 1905	17 April 1908	Forward	88	16	0	0	48				Former Salford, played in 1907 Challenge Cup final win
507	Austin Heathwood	23 April 1949	4 January 1958	Second-row	144	21	3	0	69				Double winning player in 1953–54, one Lancashire cap
1043	Danny Heaton	26 October 2003	26 October 2003	Prop	1	0	0	0	0				Signed from Woolston rovers, played in last game at Wilderspool
701	Albert Heesom	28 August 1970	13 September 1970	Second-row, Loose forward	5	1	0	0	3				Signed on loan from Huyton
31	Frank Heesom	5 October 1895	26 February 1898	Fullback	77	0	5	1	13				From the Warrington's rugby union days
383	Syd Heesom	16 September 1933	13 April 1936	Stand-off	37	3	0	0	9				Signed from Warrington RUFC, reserve for 1936 Challenge Cup final
457	Gerry Helme	29 August 1945	2 February 1957	Scrum-half	442	101	19	0	341				
941	Richard Henare	5 April 1996	11 July 1997	Wing	34	29	0	0	116				New Zealand born, leading try-scorer in 1996 with 17
706	Mick Hennighan	23 January 1971	14 January 1973	Wing	67	30	0	0	90				Signed from Salford in January 1971, moved on to Swinton
524	Ron Herbert	21 April 1951	25 January 1958	Centre	41	20	0	0	60				Made 23 appearances in 1951–52, hat-trick at Odsal in 1953
697	John Heritage	17 January 1970	3 September 1972	Wing	46	16	0	0	48				Signed from Preston Grasshoppers R.F.C. (RU), moved to Blackpool Borough
768	Steve Hesford	2 November 1975	2 October 1985	Fullback, Wing, Centre	318	46	1112	47	2416				Holds Warrington's 'most goals in a career' record
413	Albert Edward Hewitt	1 January 1936	6 February 1937	Wing	9	2	0	0	6				Sold to Leigh where he made 30 appearances in 1938–39
150	L. Hewitt	19 September 1908	12 December 1908	Forward	9	0	0	0	0				Made his début in a 3–5 defeat at Swinton
118	Richard "Dick" Hewitt	1 April 1904	2 April 1907	Forward	8	0	0	0	0				Locally produced
1079	Chris 'Spider' Hicks	8 February 2008	18 September 2010	Wing	82	71	145	0	574				Australian signed from Manly; scored a hat-trick at Wembley 2010. Début v Hull FC
623	Merv Hicks	21 October 1961	8 February 1964	Second-row	28	5	39	0	93				
439	Fred Higginbottom	26 August 1939	23 August 1947	Centre	90	19	53	0	163				Signed from Rylands, played in Brian Bevan's first game, died aged 91
41	Henry Higginbottom	25 January 1896	30 October 1897	Stand-off	31	3	0	1	13				Stand-off in the first season of rugby league, 1895–96
214	Henry Higham	13 February 1915	27 March 1915	Left-Centre	4	2	0	0	6				Scored two tries against Hunslet on home début
1085	Mickey Higham	13 February 2009	10 May 2015	Hooker	175	37	0	0	148				Signed from Wigan, Three-time Challenge Cup winner. Début v St Helens.
35	J. Higham	16 November 1895	12 October 1901	Forward	10	0	0	0	0				
537	Ted Higham	5 April 1952	21 February 1953	Wing, Centre	2	0	0	0	0				Who made his début in a 41–0 defeat at Barrow
959	Chris Highton	26 May 1997	8 June 1997	Halfback, Hooker	3	0	0	0	0				Squad No.36
975	David Highton	2 August 1998	6 May 2001	Hooker	34	2	0	0	8				First player from Warrington to fail drugs test, banned for a year
702	Syd Highton	21 November 1970	17 November 1972	Scrum-half	6	1	0	0	3				Signed from Heinz RUFC in Wigan (H. J. Heinz, Wigan), only try at Hull
1136	Peta Hiku	1 July 2017	23 September 2017	Centre, Fullback, Wing	11	10	0	0	40				
1099	Chris Hill	18 February 2012	24 September 2021	Prop	297	35	0	0	140			Great Britain & England	Signed from Leigh, Player of Year in début season
643	Fred Hill	26 October 1963	2 November 1965	Prop	29	0	0	0	0				Signed from Crosfields, sold to Blackpool borough
1013	John Hill	16 September 2001	22 September 2002	Prop	5	0	0	0	0				Signed from Wigan St Judes
32	P. Hill	5 October 1895	31 December 1898	Forward	72	0	0	0	0				Played in Warrington's first Challenge Cup tie in 1897
915	Mark Hilton	18 December 1993	15 July 2006	Prop	260	9	0	0	36				Unlucky with injuries
513	Leo Hindle	3 December 1949	15 April 1950	Prop	9	0	0	0	0				Brother of Ray Hindle, played rugby union in the Army
505	Ray Hindle	12 March 1949	3 December 1949	Wing	12	7	0	0	21				Brother of Leo Hindle, via RAF rugby union, sold to Salford
628	Brian Hindley	17 February 1962	19 October 1963	Centre	4	0	0	0	0				
726	Ken Hindley	14 November 1971	7 September 1973	Fullback	12	0	52	3	110				Once kicked 11 goals in a match against Barrow
479	J. Hitchen	21 September 1946	5 October 1946	Prop	3	0	0	0	0				Signed from amateur rugby league in Wigan
73	Thomas Hockenhull	18 March 1899	17 April 1909	Halfback	194	40	7	1	136			England	
364	Don Hodgetts	13 September 1930	13 April 1931	Right-Wing, Centre	13	0	0	0	0				Signed from Old Widnesians RUFC
1094	Brett Hodgson	12 February 2011	7 September 2013	Fullback	75	39	315	2	788				Australian signed from Huddersfield Giants, Lance Todd winner. Debut v Huddersfield Giants
914	Colin Hodkinson	11 December 1993	28 December 1993	Hooker	4	0	0	0	0				GB Academy, from Leigh Miners, retired through injury
845	Tony Hodson	28 October 1984	8 March 1987	Hooker	36	3	0	0	12				Signed from Widnes St Maries, sold to Springfield Borough
800	Steve Hogan	25 March 1979	28 October 1979	Prop	22	1	0	0	3				6 ft 2 in (1.88 m), 16 st 4 lb (103 kg), signed from Barrow in March 1979
141	James H. Holbrook	29 March 1907	1 April 1907	Forward	2	0	0	0	0				Both games at Wilderspool, against Halifax and Leeds
806	Andy Holbrook	25 November 1979	21 November 1982	Loose forward	38	3	0	0	9				Promising player from Crosfields before eye injury
62	J. Holcroft	3 September 1898	26 December 1898	Wing, Centre	13	5	1	0	17				Signed from Latchford Rangers junior team
939	Chris Holden	1 January 1996	21 March 1997	Second-row	5	0	0	0	0				Signed from Orrell St James ARLFC
636	Keith Holden Sr.	30 January 1963	12 September 1964	Centre	49	22	0	0	66				
870	Keith Holden Jr.	22 March 1987	28 February 1988	Scrum-half	31	5	0	1	21				Signed from Wigan, in 1987 Lancashire Cup final defeat
344	Billy Holding	21 January 1928	9 November 1940	Fullback	328	6	830	4	1686				
313	Charles Holland	19 September 1925	17 October 1925	Stand-off	5	1	0	0	3				Scored his only try in a 5–0 win at Oldham
458	T. Holland	29 August 1945	24 November 1945	Left wing	3	0	0	0	0				Played at Castleford in Warrington's first post-World War II match
379	G. Hollingsworth	27 August 1932	23 March 1940	Second-row	34	3	0	0	9				Signed from Scholes, Wigan junior team (surname occasionally spelt Hollinsworth, i.e. no 'g')
619	Ken Hollingsworth	9 September 1961	21 April 1964	Second-row	4	0	0	0	0				
395	J. Hollins	29 September 1934	13 April 1936	Halfback	3	0	0	0	0				
1175	Oliver Holmes	12 February 2022	3 September 2022	Second-row, Loose forward	24	3	0	0	12				Début v Leeds Rhinos
1186	Adam Holroyd	19 August 2022	present	Second-row	47	7	0	0	28				
558	Jim Honey	9 October 1954	22 September 1955	Stand-off	23	11	0	0	33				Signed from St Helens , 1955 Championship winner
350	W. Hopkins	21 April 1928	20 April 1929	Left-Wing, Second-row	6	1	0	0	3				Scored his only try at Dewsbury
1224	Albert Hopoate	6 February 2026	present	Centre, Wing	7	4	0	0	16				
501	Bill Hopper	28 December 1948	18 April 1949	Second-row	5	0	0	0	0				
551	Len Horton	28 November 1953	20 August 1958	Wing, Centre	113	61	0	0	183				Australian 1955 Championship winner
929	John Hough	3 September 1995	18 May 1997	Hooker	29	6	0	0	24				Academy Cup winner in 1993, joined Oldham
25	W. Houghton	28 September 1895	20 November 1897	Halfback	51	2	0	2	14				From the Warrington's rugby union days
547	Frank Hudson	14 February 1953	14 February 1953	Hooker	1	0	0	0	0				Signed from Pilkington Recs, played against Orford Tannery
583	John Hudson	7 September 1957	26 December 1957	Prop, Hooker	7	0	0	0	0				
784	Lewis Hudson	10 October 1976	20 March 1977	Left wing	8	1	0	0	3				
687	Arthur Hughes	28 January 1969	18 April 1970	Second-row, Loose forward	47	6	0	0	18				Signed from Oldham, former Widnes
1123	Jack Hughes	4 February 2016	18 April 2022	Second-row	169	26	0	0	104				Signed from Wigan Warriors, joined Leigh Leopards. Debut v Leeds Rhinos
525	Reg Hughes	21 April 1951	28 November 1953	Wing, Centre	12	1	0	0	3				
685	Godfrey Hulme	18 December 1968	1 January 1969	Forward	2	0	0	0	0				Signed from Eccles RUFC, killed in road traffic accident 13 Feb 1947
944	Paul Hulme	9 June 1996	22 August 1997	Hooker, Second-row	28	3	0	0	12	©			Veteran signed from Widnes, briefly Warrington captain
1005	Gary Hulse	12 August 2001	17 September 2004	Utility	50	11	0	1	45				Popular player signed from Crosfields in 2000. Debut v Castleford Tigers
509	Alf Humphreys	3 September 1949	10 April 1954	Wing	75	40	0	0	120				Signed from Halifax, sold to Leigh
861	Tony Humphries	7 September 1986	9 April 1989	Forward	62	6	0	0	24				Signed from Crosfields, made one appearance for Lancashire
982	Alan Hunte	14 February 1999	16 September 2001	Centre	91	57	0	0	228				Former St Helens and Great Britain, signed from Hull FC
107	D. Hunter	10 January 1903	24 January 1903	Stand-off	2	0	0	0	0				Played in defeats at Brighouse Rangers, and Runcorn
763	Eddie Hunter	5 April 1975	7 February 1982	Loose forward	115	27	0	0	81				Substitute in 1978 team who beat Australia
661	Peter Hutchinson	9 March 1966	4 October 1969	Wing	30	10	0	0	30				Signed from Crosfields, nine tries in 1968–69 season
624	Barry Ibbotson	21 October 1961	21 October 1961	Left wing	1	1	0	0	3				Try-scoring début in 35–5 defeat at Oldham
1173	Greg Inglis	1 May 2021	17 May 2021	Centre, Fullback, Stand-off	3	2	0	0	8				
1215	Ewan Irwin	25 April 2025	present	Stand-off, Scrum-half	6	1	28	0	60				Début against St Helens where he came on as 18th man after Marc Sneyd was injured
591	Geoff Irwin	23 August 1958	23 August 1958	Prop	1	0	0	0	0				Played in a 20–16 win over Keighley at Wilderspool
43	Danny Isherwood	11 April 1896	5 September 1908	Centre	297	45	14	4	171				Played in four Challenge Cup finals, winning two 1 Lancashire cap
498	Bill Jackson	20 November 1948	13 October 1951	Centre	28	14	0	0	52				Signed from Hull Kingston Rovers, emigrated to Canada
841	Bob Jackson	2 September 1984	4 April 1994	Prop	228	41	8	1	181				Australian in legendary Boyd, Tamati, Jackson front row
876	Mark Jackson	8 November 1987	22 November 1987	Forward	3	0	0	0	0				Australian from South Sydney Rabbitohs, arrived with brother Steve Jackson (?)
119	W. Jackson	26 April 1904	27 April 1904	Centre	2	0	0	0	0				Locally produced, two appearances in two days
144	F. G. Jenkins	25 January 1908	28 March 1908	Forward	12	2	1	0	8				Welsh, signed from Newport RFC
393	Griff Jenkins	22 September 1934	2 January 1939	Wing	131	57	0	0	171				Warrington-born, played in three major finals, all lost, son of John Jenkins, Salford coach 1964–1970
139	John Jenkins	10 December 1906	1 October 1910	Scrum-half	99	31	0	0	93			Wales	
1075	Anthony Jerram	15 April 2007	21 April 2007	Second-row	2	0	0	0	0				Warrington-born, moved to Newtown Jets (Sydney). Debut v Leeds Rhinos
760	Peter Jewitt	6 December 1974	7 February 1976	Second-row	28	7	0	0	21				Signed from Higginshaw ARLFC, sold to Oldham
80	Frank Jewkes	6 January 1900	6 January 1900	Unknown	1	0	0	0	0				Local association footballer who switched codes in the summer of 1899
1062	Andrew 'Joey' Johns	10 September 2005	24 September 2005	Scrum-half, Hooker	3	1	12	1	29				The best player in the world, paid £10,000 per match
434	Albert Johnson	21 January 1939	12 May 1951	Wing	198	112	2	0	340				
285	Arthur 'Chick' Johnson	3 February 1923	15 November 1924	Second-row, Loose forward	58	10	0	0	30				
856	Brian Johnson	6 October 1985	8 May 1988	Fullback	103	48	0	0	192				Australian, 25 tries in 86–87, Coach 88–96
1121	Jack Johnson	6 September 2015	21 June 2019	Fullback	18	7	0	0	28				Progressed through the Academy, joined Featherstone Rovers. Two spells with the club, namely, 2015-17 & 2019. Debut v Hull FC
1146	Luis Johnson	14 September 2018	13 October 2020	Second-row	9	0	0	0	0				
1073	Paul Johnson	19 February 2007	29 August 2009	Wing, Centre, Stand-off, Second-row, Loose forward	53	18	0	0	72				Unlucky with injury. Debut v Wigan Warriors
399	R. Johnson	22 December 1934	14 February 1935	Loose forward	11	2	0	0	6				Scored a try against Widnes on Christmas Day 1934
173	Bill 'Massa' Johnston	17 December 1910	17 April 1911	Second-row	38	8	0	0	24				Represented NZ in Rugby Union and Rugby League. Incorrectly identified in some sources as H. Johnson from 2 September 1911 to 1 January 1912
185	Ben Jolley	30 March 1912	4 September 1926	Fullback	282	1	317	8	653				Missed 1920 Great Britain tour because of a broken leg
48	G. Jolley	14 November 1896	12 September 1908	Forward	136	0	0	0	0				Played in Warrington's first Challenge Cup win in 1905
84	J. Jolley	1 September 1900	25 April 1903	Forward	34	1	0	0	3				Scored his only try against Oldham at Wilderspool
235	Jack Jolley	22 February 1919	11 September 1920	Left-Wing, Centre	40	3	5	0	19				
219	R. Jolley	18 January 1919	18 January 1919	Forward	1	0	0	0	0				Only appearance in a 13–3 defeat at Widnes
56	… Jones	8 January 1898	10 September 1898	Fullback	2	0	0	0	0				
402	… Jones (trialist)	16 February 1935	16 February 1935	Prop	1	1	0	0	0				Trialist who scored a try against Barrow at Wilderspool
225	Alf Jones	25 January 1919	25 January 1919	Halfback	1	0	0	0	0				Moved to Leigh where he also made one appearance
356	Bill Jones	1 April 1929	14 April 1934	Second-row	128	18	0	0	54				Played in 1932 Lancashire Cup win. 2 Lancashire caps
730	Clive Jones	20 August 1972	15 December 1974	Second-row, Loose forward	45	6	0	0	18				
77	Evan Thomas Jones	2 September 1899	31 March 1900	Centre	27	6	13	0	44				Welsh, signed from Huddersfield, transferred to St Helens in 1903
436	H. B. Jones	17 April 1939	9 May 1940	Scrum-half	9	1	0	0	3				Signed from Swinton & District Amateur RL
427	Harry Jones	22 January 1938	2 June 1947	Forward	139	3	0	0	9				Signed from Higginshaw ARLFC, moved to Keighley
419	Les 'Cowboy' Jones	31 October 1936	6 May 1950	Fullback	270	26	7	14	120				Welsh, Challenge Cup and championship winner, Cowboy legs
925	Mark Jones	20 August 1995	26 August 1996	Forward	38	2	0	0	8				Welsh, signed from Hull, moved to Ebbw Vale
130	Owen Jones	4 January 1902	13 April 1906	Centre	17	1	0	0	3				Signed from Castner Kellner RUFC (Castner–Kellner Co.) in Runcorn
654	Phil Jones	1 May 1965	2 October 1971	Prop	71	4	0	0	12				Signed from Wigan RUFC
323	Ron Jones	30 August 1926	24 December 1927	Centre	31	9	18	0	63				Signed from Forest of Dean RUFC
737	Wally Jones	14 November 1972	17 November 1972	Wing, Centre	2	0	0	0	0				Signed from Crosfields, moved to Rochdale
114	Ernie Jordan	17 October 1903	17 January 1914	Utility Back	81	17	0	1	53				Local, played every position from 1 to 6
1127	Benjamin Jullien	4 February 2016	23 September 2017	Centre	36	6	0	0	24				French from Avignon signed after successful trial, second Frenchman to play for Warrington (first was Jerome Guisset). Debut v Leeds Rhinos
601	Dennis Karalius	15 August 1959	13 February 1960	Second-row	19	3	0	0	9				Member of famous RL family, signed from St Helens
1194	Sam Kasiano	16 February 2023	30 September 2023	Prop	26	3	0	0	12				
142	James Kay	29 March 1907	10 April 1909	Stand-off	2	0	0	0	0				
787	Ken Kelly	1 January 1977	15 March 1987	Halfback	316	73	0	10	248	©			
788	Mike Kelly	1 April 1977	23 October 1983	Wing	134	33	0	0	100				Signed from Crosfields ARL, in 1978 team who beat Australia
898	Neil Kenyon	14 January 1990	4 April 1993	Wing	46	28	0	0	12				Scored a hat-trick of tries on his Warrington début
115	Tommy Kenyon	23 January 1904	9 November 1907	Left wing	45	13	0	0	39				Played in Warrington's first Challenge Cup win in 1905
840	John Kerr	1 April 1984	23 April 1984	Halfback	5	3	0	0	12				Signed from Boilermakers ARLFC, moved to Leigh
541	Ken Kerrigan	15 November 1952	25 September 1954	Stand-off	11	2	0	0	6				Signed from Orford Tannery, died aged-26 following road traffic accident in October 1960 (Marie Pendlebury)
148	W. Kettle	12 September 1908	12 September 1908	Forward	1	0	0	0	0				Made only appearance against Widnes at Wilderspool
930	Ron Kettlewell	3 September 1995	9 June 1996	Centre	5	0	0	0	0				BARLA tourist, signed from Walney Central ARLFC
1162	Samy Kibula	30 August 2020	29 September 2020	Prop	2	0	0	0	0				
1001	David Kidwell	11 February 2001	1 April 2002	Centre	32	12	0	0	48			New Zealand	Signed from Parramatta Eels
565	Billy Kilbride	5 November 1955	6 April 1957	Wing, Scrum-half	9	6	0	0	18				Signed from Richard Fairclough School
926	Dave King	27 August 1995	1 January 1996	Forward	13	1	0	0	4				Giant Australian - 6ft 5in - signed from Huddersfield
1113	George King	29 June 2014	13 October 2018	Second-row	97	7	0	0	28				Signed from Huddersfield's Academy, older brother of Toby King. Debut v Bradford Bulls
1080	Matt King	8 February 2008	30 September 2011	Centre	106	66	0	0	264				Australian international from Melbourne Storm. Debut v Hull FC
392	Rex King	25 August 1934	13 February 1937	Loose forward	76	29	0	0	87				New Zealand, won the Military Cross for bravery
1114	Toby King	13 July 2014	present	Centre	192	77	0	0	308			England & Ireland	Signed from Huddersfield, younger brother of George King. Debut v London Broncos. Two spells with the club, namely 2014-22 & 2024-present
340	Billy Kirk	19 November 1927	30 March 1934	Scrum-half	102	16	0	0	48				
529	Cyril Knight	29 August 1951	26 December 1952	Stand-off	23	3	0	0	9				Signed from Penketh Tannery ARLFC in March 1951
772	Glenn Knight	26 December 1975	23 January 1977	Stand-off	37	17	1	1	54				Signed from Huddersfield, moved to Oldham
850	Mark Knight	16 December 1984	4 April 1988	Forward	13	2	0	0	8				Signed from Widnes Tigers, moved to Chorley Borough
94	Tommy Knight	28 December 1901	29 March 1907	Fullback	44	3	4	0	17				Signed from Latchford Rangers junior club, died August 1927
928	Ian Knott	30 August 1995	9 September 2001	Second-row, Loose forward	135	34	19	0	174				Signed from Wigan St Judes, moved to Wakefield Trinity Wildcats
492	Bryn Knowelden	13 December 1947	29 September 1951	Centre, Stand-off	125	37	0	0	111				
940	Toa Kohe-Love	31 March 1996	30 September 2006	Centre	185	96	0	0	384				Junior Kiwi who scored 28 tries in 1999 season.
1104	James Laithwaite	3 March 2013	27 June 2015	Second-row, Loose forward	50	1	0	0	4				England Under-18s international. Debut v Hull KR
136	M. Lambert	24 March 1906	24 March 1906	Stand-off	1	0	0	0	0				Only appearance against Widnes at Wilderspool
1163	Leilani Latu	4 September 2020	29 September 2020	Prop	3	1	0	0	4				
534	Roy Lambert	8 December 1951	15 November 1952	Wing	38	25	0	0	75				
153	A. J. Landor	17 October 1908	17 September 1910	Wing	5	2	0	0	6				
138	W. Landor	26 November 1906	1 January 1908	Wing	7	3	0	0	9				
989	Allan 'Alfie' Langer	13 February 2000	29 July 2001	Scrum-half	55	16	4	0	72				Legendary Australian whose signing was a real coup
593	Paddy Lannon	27 September 1958	13 January 1962	Hooker	72	1	0	0	3				Played in 1959 Lancashire Cup win
670	Ken Large	18 November 1966	26 November 1966	Centre	2	0	0	0	0				Former St Helens , on a month's trial from Blackpool
707	Brian Larkin	23 January 1971	25 August 1972	Prop	32	5	0	0	15				Signed from Widnes, sold to Barrow
464	A. Lathom	15 September 1945	27 April 1946	Loose forward	14	1	0	0	3				Signed from Wigan & District Amateur RL
1021	Dale Laughton	10 February 2002	1 September 2002	Prop	18	0	0	0	0				Former Sheffield Eagles, signed from the Huddersfield Giants
254	Bill Lavin	25 September 1920	21 January 1922	Centre	34	3	0	0	9				Signed from St Helens , 30 appearances in 1920–21
26	Joe Lawless	28 September 1895	8 April 1901	Left wing	56	10	0	1	34				
208	Tommy Laws	5 September 1914	6 March 1920	Centre, Halfback	42	4	0	0	12				Also made 20 friendly appearances in 1917–18
984	Andrew Leathem	18 April 1999	13 June 1999	Prop	10	0	0	0	0				Warrington-born on loan from St Helens for two months
709	Kevan Leatherbarrow	6 February 1971	30 January 1972	Halfback	4	0	0	0	0				Suffered a broken clavicle (collar bone) on his début
459	Frank Lee	29 August 1945	20 September 1947	Centre	7	5	0	0	15				Signed from Culcheth amateur rugby league
921	Jason Lee	9 November 1994	24 September 1995	Wing	12	4	0	0	16				Signed from Dudley Hill amateurs, played for Wales
321	Harry Lees	2 April 1926	2 April 1926	Fullback	1	0	0	0	0				Signed from Oldham RUFC
134	Sammy Lees	3 February 1906	27 February 1909	Stand-off	68	18	0	2	58				Signed from Oldham, try scorer in 1907 Challenge Cup win
663	Brian Leigh	25 March 1966	12 November 1966	Centre	8	0	2	0	4				Kicked 2 goals at Castleford in Floodlit Trophy defeat
1052	Chris Leikvoll	21 February 2004	14 September 2007	Prop	95	4	0	0	16				Australian from Sydney St George, British passport holder
786	Roy Lester	14 November 1976	20 January 1980	Prop	94	7	0	0	21				In 1978 team who beat the Australians, later on coaching staff
519	Tom Lewis	15 April 1950	15 April 1950	Stand-off	1	0	0	0	0				Played against Liverpool Stanley at Wilderspool
121?	Oliver Leyland	8 February 2025	present	Fullback, Stand-off, Scrum-half	5	2	0	0	8				Début against Whitehaven RLFC in the Challenge Cup
302	W. H. Leyland	4 October 1924	25 September 1926	Second-row	39	2	0	0	6				Signed from Wigan Old Boys RUFC
710	Noel Lightfoot	6 February 1971	5 April 1972	Second-row	15	0	0	0	0				Signed from Warrington's 'B' team
1053	Danny Lima	21 February 2004	10 June 2006	Prop	69	10	0	0	40				Powerful Samoan from Manly, first Kolpak signing
449	… Lindley	14 September 1940	14 September 1940	Prop	1	0	0	0	0				Played against Broughton Rangers at Wilderspool
1200	Arron Lindop	17 February 2024	present	Centre, Wing	23	12	0	0	48				
1124	Tom Lineham	4 February 2016	24 September 2021	Wing	133	83	0	0	332				Signed from Hull FC for £140,000
477	Ken Livesey	18 May 1946	18 October 1952	Prop	14	1	0	0	3				Signed from Wigan & District Amateur RL
1133	Harvey Livett	11 February 2017	29 August 2019	Centre, Second-row	47	17	39	0	146				Joined Hull KR
131	Jack Lloyd	25 December 1905	16 December 1911	Halfback	79	14	0	0	42				
236	Samual Lloyd	12 April 1919	24 January 1920	Wing	20	1	0	0	3				Scored his only try in 13–12 win at Oldham in May 1919 (Samuel Lloyd?)
1165	Ellis Longstaff	4 September 2020	14 May 2022	Second-row	14	0	0	0	0				
425	P. Loughlin	16 October 1937	16 October 1937	Hooker	1	0	0	0	0				Played against Leeds in one of Dave Cotton's rare absences
516	Gerry Lowe	7 April 1950	11 February 1956	Forward	129	12	0	0	36				Signed from Warrington RUFC, double Challenge Cup winner birth registered October→December 1927 (age 98–99) in Warrington district, as of February 2017 Gerard Lowe is the last surviving member of Warrington's 1954 Challenge Cup Final winning team.
721	John Lowe	8 September 1971	28 December 1975	Scrum-half	55	5	0	0	15				Former Leigh, became a pub landlord
869	Paul Lowndes	15 March 1987	15 March 1987	Forward	1	0	0	0	0				On loan from Oldham, Substitute/Interchange in 10–14 defeat at Hull Kingston Rovers
104	Elijah Lunt	13 December 1902	1 January 1906	Forward	34	0	0	0	0				Played in 1904 Challenge Cup team, became a director of Warrington
1188	Josh Lynch	29 August 2022	present	Wing	1	1	0	0	4				Loaned to North Wales Crusaders for 2023 season; banned for 16 months on 19 March 2025 for doping
874	David "Dave" Lyon	27 October 1987	26 April 1992	Fullback	147	31	112	1	349			Lancashire	Sold to St Helens for £90,000
764	Dennis Lyons	5 April 1975	13 March 1976	Loose forward	10	2	0	0	6				Signed from St Helens
476	A. MacDonald	10 April 1946	16 November 1946	Second-row	3	1	0	0	3				Scored his only try at Hull in a 9–5 victory
659	Gil MacDougal	11 December 1965	19 March 1966	Centre	6	3	0	0	9				Fiery Australian from Western Suburbs
891	Greg Mackey	3 September 1989	15 December 1995	Scrum-half	123	19	4	20	104				Made 98 consecutive appearances from 1992 to 1995
696	Allan Maddalena	29 November 1969	29 November 1969	Fullback	1	0	0	0	0				Australian guest player from Newtown Jets
1022	Steve Maden	10 February 2002	22 September 2002	Centre	4	0	0	0	0				Signed from Golborne Parkside ARLFC, released and joined St Helens
938	Mateaki Mafi	20 December 1995	14 March 1997	Wing	23	8	0	0	32			Tonga	Signed from Tongan RU, later joined Workington Town
1178	Billy Magoulias	27 March 2022	3 June 2022	Prop, Hooker, Second-row, Loose forward	8	0	0	0	0			Greece	
113	D. Mahoney	26 September 1903	27 April 1904	Centre, Stand-off	16	0	0	0	0				Signed from Cardiff RFC
715	Terry Main	12 August 1971	12 August 1971	Wing	1	0	0	0	0				Signed from Warrington Colts
585	Harry Major	14 September 1957	13 October 1962	Second-row	150	15	0	0	45				Played in 1959 Lancashire Cup win, and 1961 Championship final
284	Eddie Makin	25 December 1922	3 October 1925	Wing	22	8	0	0	24				Product of Warrington's 'A' team
918	Francis Maloney	25 September 1994	17 April 1995	Stand-off	20	4	0	0	16				
1151	Jake Mamo	22 February 2019	24 September 2021	Centre, Fullback, Wing	56	29	0	0	116				Australian
896	Duane Mann	17 December 1989	25 April 1993	Hooker	124	20	0	6	86				
951	George Mann	8 March 1997	25 August 1997	Prop	24	1	0	0	4				Spent season on loan from Leeds
578	John Manniex	23 February 1957	19 September 1959	Prop	24	4	0	0	12				Signed from Wigan Road Working Men's Club in Leigh
279	Tom Mannion	23 September 1922	7 April 1923	Centre	20	1	18	0	39				Signed from Barrow (RLFC?), featured in Pinnacle cigarette cards
1025	Paul Marquet	23 February 2002	1 September 2002	Second-row	26	1	0	0	4				Australian from Newcastle Knights
365	Jim Marsden	29 November 1930	18 April 1933	Second-row	63	10	0	1	32				Yorkshire county, signed from Dewsbury
664	Rob Marsden	30 March 1966	14 November 1970	Second-row	14	0	0	0	0				Signed from Oldham St Annes ARLFC
1176	Peter Mata'utia	12 February 2022	30 September 2023	Centre, Fullback, Wing, Stand-off	54	6	8	0	40				
761	Tommy Martyn	5 January 1975	4 May 1981	Second-row	220	51	0	1	154				
1002	Martin Masella	11 February 2001	16 September 2001	Prop	27	5	0	0	20				Captained Tonga in World Cup, signed from Wakefield Trinity Wildcats
432	… Mason	14 January 1939	8 September 1945	Second-row, Loose forward	3	0	0	0	0				
272	Frank Mason	27 December 1921	11 April 1931	Centre, Second-row	105	7	0	0	21				Testimonial in 1932–33
52	J. Mason	4 December 1897	18 March 1899	Forward	22	5	7	0	29				First player to kick a goal at Wilderspool, in 1898
575	John Massey	19 January 1957	26 January 1957	Halfback	2	1	0	0	3				Scored try in trial game under the name "Johnson" (unsure as to whether he was from RU)
747	Ian Mather	8 December 1973	22 August 1975	Second-row, Loose forward	24	1	0	0	3				Warrington-born, two winners' medals in 1973–74
210	Robert Mather	3 October 1914	16 September 1922	Prop	71	1	0	0	3				Played in 1921 Lancashire Cup win, scored his only try at Runcorn
1035	Richard Mathers	14 July 2002	26 August 2002	Fullback, Wing, Centre	7	0	0	0	0				Warrington Wolves début aged 18, two-time Challenge Cup winner
262	Will Matthews	16 April 1921	16 April 1921	Right-Centre	1	0	0	0	0				Played at Swinton on the last day of 1920–21 season
332	… Maxfield (trialist)	19 April 1927	19 April 1927	Centre	1	0	0	0	0				Pseudonym used by a Welsh player
847	Hussein M'Barki	18 November 1984	14 April 1985	Wing	8	2	0	0	8				Controversially signed by Reg Bowden from Fulham, as the RFL deemed him a free-agent
522	Jock McAvoy	21 October 1950	3 September 1951	Fullback, Centre, Stand-off	12	2	0	0	6				Signed from Workington
1087	Tyrone McCarthy	14 August 2009	16 August 2013	Second-row, Loose forward	43	3	0	0	12			Ireland	Two Wembley wins as a substitute and one Wembley try. Debut v Wigan Warriors
554	Stan McCormick	30 January 1954	3 March 1956	Left wing	48	17	0	0	51				Signed from St. Helens
454	Tommy McCue	23 November 1940	23 November 1940	Halfback	1	2	0	0	6				Wartime guest
968	Steve McCurrie	15 February 1998	9 September 2001	Second-row	107	37	0	0	148				Signed from Bedford Blues (RU), former Widnes
595	Eddie McDonnell	24 January 1959	31 January 1959	Left wing	2	1	0	0	3				Try-scoring début against Blackpool at Wilderspool
1032	Craig McDowell	2 June 2002	2 June 2002	Stand-off, Loose forward	1	0	0	0	0				Signed on loan from Bradford Bulls
563	Bill McFarlane	8 October 1955	25 August 1958	Loose forward	46	18	0	0	54				Signed from Leigh, ITV Trophy (see BBC2 Floodlit Trophy) winner in 1955
824	Billy McGinty	15 September 1982	14 April 1991	Second-row	135	20	0	0	80				
543	Brian McGuinness	22 November 1952	21 March 1953	Scrum-half	2	0	0	0	0				
917	Bruce McGuire	21 August 1994	24 September 1995	Prop, Second-row	46	7	0	0	28				Tough Australian, signed from the Sheffield Eagles
1196	Josh McGuire	8 April 2023	26 May 2023	Prop, Second-row, Loose forward	7	1	0	0	4				Australian
646	Bernie McGurrin	29 February 1964	21 March 1964	Loose forward	3	0	0	0	0				Signed from Rochdale Hornets
708	Alan McInnes	23 January 1971	20 August 1971	Centre	15	5	2	0	19				Former RU, signed from Salford, schoolteacher
682	Len McIntyre	24 September 1968	5 December 1970	Hooker	80	6	0	0	18				
158	Will McIntyre	27 March 1909	14 December 1912	Fullback	56	14	16	0	74				
560	Tom McKinney	15 January 1955	12 January 1957	Hooker	64	3	0	0	9			Great Britain	
1221	Tom McKinney	29 August 2025	present	Prop	3	0	0	0	0				
251	Frank McNulty	28 August 1920	24 November 1923	Scrum-half	65	10	3	0	36				Ginger-haired, signed from Wigan Highfield, died in 1949 ?
46	… Meacock	17 October 1896	13 December 1902	Forward	7	0	0	0	0				
953	Dallas Mead	21 January 1997	28 January 1997	Prop	2	0	0	0	0				Junior Kiwi from Auckland Warriors, injured on début
857	Kevin Meadows	31 March 1986	22 March 1987	Wing	32	15	0	0	60				Signed from St Helens , moved to Oldham
638	Jackie Melling	15 April 1963	15 January 1971	Centre	173	65	1	5	207				Scored two tries in 1965 Lancashire Cup final victory
897	Gary 'Ming' Mercer	26 December 1989	4 August 2001	Centre, Second-row	101	18	3	0	78				Two impressive spells with club, Ming the Merciless
338	Jesse Meredith	17 October 1927	25 April 1931	Centre, Second-row	113	9	1	1	31				
78	D. F. Mereweather	2 September 1899	29 April 1901	Forward	42	3	0	0	9				Signed from Bristol Rugby (RU) (centre)
746	Charlie Middlehurst	30 September 1973	26 September 1979	Hooker	22	1	1	4	14				Signed from Leigh (31 appearances 1965–72)
1191	Chris Middlehurst			Unknown	0	0	0	0	0				
1180	Thomas Mikaele	12 June 2022	22 September 2023	Prop	25	4	0	0	16				New Zealander
552	Brian Miller	12 December 1953	6 April 1957	Stand-off	13	1	0	0	3				
328	Jack 'Cod' Miller	11 December 1926	9 February 1946	Prop	526	31	0	0	93				
770	Tony Miller	30 November 1975	12 February 1977	Hooker	44	8	0	3	27	©			Signed from Huddersfield, having previously played for Castleford, emigrated to Australia
1180	Greg Minikin	3 July 2022	14 July 2023	Centre, Wing	21	2	0	0	8				
386	Harry Mitchell	1 January 1934	1 January 1934	Wing	1	0	0	0	0				Signed from New Springs ARLFC
1076	Lee Mitchell	19 August 2007	4 September 2011	Second-row	37	4	0	0	16				Spent 2012 season on loan at Castleford. Debut v Catalans Dragons
879	Steve Molloy	28 August 1988	16 April 1990	Prop	50	0	0	0	0				Sold to Leeds for £110,000
1095	Joel Monaghan	12 February 2011	24 September 2015	Wing	145	145	2	0	584				Australian, Ex-Canberra Raiders, younger brother of Michael Monaghan. Debut v Huddersfield Giants
1081	Michael Monaghan	8 February 2008	3 October 2014	Hooker, Halfback	192	35	0	4	144				Signed from Manly, Lance Todd Trophy winner in 2009, older brother of Joel Monaghan. Debut v Hull FC
343	Bill Moon	27 December 1927	27 December 1927	Prop	1	0	0	0	0				Only appearance against Wigan Highfield
36	Freddie Moores	16 November 1895	24 March 1900	Right wing	62	12	0	0	36				Signed from St Peter's (ARLFC?), played in first game at Wilderspool
90	J. Moores	6 April 1901	6 April 1901	Right wing	1	0	0	0	0				Signed from St Peter's (ARLFC?), played in first game at Wilderspool
1144	Pat Moran	21 April 2018	12 July 2019	Prop	2	0	0	0	0			Ireland	
209	William George Morgan	12 September 1914	26 September 1914	Right-Centre	3	0	0	0	0				His three appearances all ended in defeat
168	William Morgan	3 September 1910	4 March 1911	Forward	26	0	0	0	0				
1074	Adrian 'Moz' Morley	9 February 2007	5 October 2013	Prop	173	9	0	0	36	©		Great Britain & England	Captain for three Challenge Cup wins. Debut v Wigan Warriors
969	Chris Morley	15 February 1998	5 July 1998	Second-row, Loose forward	12	0	0	0	0				Signed from St Helens as part of the Paul Sculthorpe deal
275	Ellis Morley	21 January 1922	4 December 1926	Forward	6	0	0	0	0				
324	J. Morris (trialist)	4 September 1926	9 September 1926	Wing	2	1	0	0	3				Pseudonym given to a trialist from Midlands RU club
828	Steve Morris	20 February 1983	27 October 1985	Centre	8	0	0	0	0				Signed from Leigh Rangers in 1982, moved to Salford
53	David Morrison	18 December 1897	31 March 1906	Forward	162	5	0	1	17				Played in Warrington's first two Challenge Cup finals in 1901 & 1904
871	Andy Mossop	8 April 1987	20 April 1987	Loose forward	4	1	0	0	4				Signed from Millom ARLFC, moved to Barrow
538	Cecil 'The Blackball Bullet' Mountford	4 October 1952	3 October 1953	Stand-off	37	6	2	0	22				
832	Steve Moylan	10 April 1983	21 April 1985	Hooker	15	0	0	0	0				Signed from Wigan St Patrick's, moved to Salford
440	Alec Mulhall	4 November 1939	31 January 1948	Forward	20	1	0	0	3				Transferred to Keighley
1171	Robbie Mulhern	28 March 2021	29 August 2022	Prop, Loose forward	47	1	0	0	4			England & Ireland	
825	Roby Muller	6 October 1982	20 April 1992	Forward	47	4	0	0	15				Popular Maori who enjoyed two spells at Wilderspool
1139	Ben Murdoch-Masila	1 February 2018	12 November 2020	Prop, Second-row, Loose forward	68	21	0	0	84			Tonga	
713	Alex Murphy	6 August 1971	21 September 1975	Stand-off	67	9	12	28	107	©			Player-coach
946	Anthony Murray	9 February 1997	9 February 1997	Hooker	1	0	0	0	0				Signed from Wigan, moved to Widnes
963	David 'Doc' Murray	25 August 1997	5 September 1997	Fullback	3	0	0	0	0				New Zealand-born, signed on loan from Wigan
611	Terry Musgrove	23 April 1960	23 April 1960	Centre	1	0	0	0	0				Served in Royal Navy, played in a 27–8 defeat at Workington
1201	Zane Musgrove	17 February 2024	4 May 2025	Prop, Loose forward	38	2	0	0	8				New Zealander
893	David Myers	29 October 1989	21 January 1990	Centre	6	0	0	0	0				Controversial signing from Widnes, both Warrington and Widnes claimed to have signed him, and the RFL tribunal came down in Warrington's favour, sold to Wigan
1090	Richie Myler	7 February 2010	24 September 2015	Scrum-half	139	77	2	1	313				Signed from Salford for £290,000. Debut v Harlequins RL
895	Robert Myler	19 November 1989	28 January 1995	Wing	58	29	2	0	120				At his best in 1993-94 when he scored 17 tries
511	Albert Naughton	17 December 1949	20 May 1961	Centre	348	167	0	0	501				
545	Danny Naughton	1 January 1953	29 September 1956	Prop	130	3	0	0	9				
102	Arthur 'Crack' Naylor	22 November 1902	18 April 1914	Forward	202	9	0	0	27				Played in two Challenge Cup-winning teams, 1905 and 1907
50	J. Naylor	2 March 1897	18 November 1899	Forward	61	3	0	0	9				Played in first game at Wilderspool in September 1898
1082	Adam Neal	20 April 2008	20 April 2008	Prop	1	0	0	0	0				Signed from Crosfields, made début as a substitute at Leigh aged 17
9	Will Nevins	7 September 1895	17 April 1897	Forward	53	2	3	1	16				Became a referee, two Lancashire caps in 1895–96
372	Jimmy Newcombe	12 December 1931	18 February 1939	Stand-off	135	20	2	4	72				Played in 1936 Challenge Cup final at Wembley
733	Mike Nicholas	8 October 1972	17 April 1980	Forward	152	14	8	0	58				
192	Sid Nicholas	19 October 1912	18 October 1919	Stand-off	71	6	21	0	60				Played in 1913 Challenge Cup final team
574	Dick Nicholls	10 October 1956	2 February 1957	Prop	12	1	0	0	3				Scored his only try against Workington at Wilderspool
205	Tom Nicholls	28 March 1914	28 January 1922	Wing	18	5	2	0	19				Five tries in 14 appearances in 1920–21 season
1184	Matty Nicholson	10 July 2022	4 October 2024	Second-row	50	17	0	0	68			England	
990	Tawera Nikau	13 February 2000	16 September 2001	Loose forward	59	7	0	0	28				
723	Derek Noonan	2 October 1971	30 November 1975	Centre	147	34	0	0	102				3-caps for England while at Warrington, plus one match against Papua New Guinea
993	Paul Noone	21 May 2000	2 July 2006	Wing, Centre, Stand-off, Second-row, Loose forward	66+62	14	26	0	108				Versatile player signed from Widnes Tigers aged 14
478	John Norburn	31 August 1946	6 December 1947	Centre	15	2	0	0	6				Signed from Wigan RUFC
435	Walter Norris	11 February 1939	14 September 1946	Forward	26	1	0	0	3				Signed from Rylands, moved to St Helens in 1947
816	Jimmy Nulty	30 August 1981	11 October 1981	Scrum-half	2	0	0	0	0				Former Wigan, signed on loan from Barrow
970	Danny Nutley	15 February 1998	16 September 2001	Prop	107	3	0	0	12				Australian, Coach's Player of the Year in 1999
650	Geoffrey Oakes	21 November 1964	28 September 1966	Hooker	48	1	0	0	3				
1096	Gareth O'Brien	8 May 2011	1 August 2015	Scrum-half	62	19	78	3	235				Made a try-scoring début against Keighley
10	W. O'Brien	7 September 1895	5 September 1896	Centre	12	1	0	1	7				Played against Hunslet in Warrington's first Northern Union game
521	Paddy O'Donnell	10 October 1950	3 November 1951	Stand-off	13	1	0	0	3				Signed from Leigh, went on loan to Liverpool City
269	George Ogden	10 September 1921	11 November 1922	Second-row	47	0	0	0	0				Played in the 1921 Lancashire Cup win, transferred to Leigh
594	Terry O'Grady	27 September 1958	8 September 1962	Wing	138	84	0	0	252				
823	Roger O'Mahony	5 September 1982	9 December 1984	Hooker	78	2	0	0	7				Signed from Oldham, Warrington's Player of the Year in 1983–84
161	Larry 'Jersey' O'Malley	11 September 1909	7 April 1910	Forward	36	7	0	0	21				
154	Billy O'Neill	17 October 1908	4 April 1910	Forward	56	9	0	0	27			Wales	
1012	Tom O'Reilly	31 August 2001	22 September 2002	Scrum-half	16	2	0	0	8				Papua New Guinea international
1109	Gene Ormsby	21 February 2014	10 June 2016	Wing	42	29	0	0	116				6 ft 2 in (1.88 m), signed from Oldham St Annes. Debut v Leeds Rhinos
366	J. O'Rourke	25 December 1930	3 September 1932	Wing	4	1	0	0	3				Signed from Orford Tannery, only try against Broughton
380	Jack Oster	27 August 1932	9 September 1933	Stand-off	40	4	0	2	16				
901	Chris O'Sullivan	20 October 1990	14 April 1991	Stand-off	28	3	0	2	14				1991 Regal Trophy winner
480	Joe O'Toole	5 October 1946	2 June 1947	Prop	34	2	0	0	6				Signed from Crosfields ARLFC, had played RU in Army
557	Peter O'Toole	25 September 1954	30 August 1958	Prop	66	5	0	0	15				Cousin of Joe O'Toole, ITV Cup (see BBC2 Floodlit Trophy) winner in 1955
665	Dave Owen	30 March 1966	23 October 1967	Scrum-half	10	1	0	0	3				Signed from Lowerhouse ARLFC in Widnes
291	E. Owen	1 November 1923	17 November 1923	Halfback	5	0	0	0	0				
724	Jimmy Owen	30 October 1971	30 October 1971	Forward	1	0	0	0	0				Welsh, made a substitute appearance at Hull (Welsh RU?) ★
1044	Nick Owen	26 October 2003	26 October 2003	Fullback	1	1	4	0	12				Signed from Woolston Rovers, made début against New Zealand 'A'
414	Harold 'Moggy' Palin	22 February 1936	18 April 1951	Loose forward	150	32	436	3	974	©			
181	Riki Papakura	14 October 1911	14 October 1911	Centre	1	0	0	0	0				New Zealander
424	Dai Parker	2 October 1937	4 March 1939	Scrum-half	16	0	0	1	2				Signed from Neath RFC
1063	Rob Parker	12 February 2006	6 September 2008	Loose forward, Second-row	66	6	0	0	24				Popular, signed from Bradford, moved to Salford. Debut v Salford Red Devils
580	Terry Parkinson	2 March 1957	26 March 1960	Scrum-half	23	4	0	0	12				Wigan schoolboy star along with Jackie Edwards
668	Ken Parr	12 November 1966	21 November 1971	Second-row	107+13	18	0	1	56				
1014	Ian Parry	16 September 2001	16 September 2001	Prop	1	0	0	0	0				Played in 31–28 win at Castleford on last day of season
325	Jack Parry	2 October 1926	7 April 1928	Wing	36	7	0	0	21				
991	Neil Parsley	13 February 2000	13 February 2000	Wing	1	1	0	0	4				Signed from Lancashire Lynx
675	Bill Pattinson	29 August 1967	18 April 1970	Forward	25	4	0	0	12				
1118	Declan Patton	11 April 2015	13 October 2020	Stand-off	108	16	143	7	357				Made début in 80–0 victory over Wakefield Trinity Wildcats
471	J. Paulus	1 December 1945	1 December 1945	Left wing	1	0	0	0	0				Played in a 10–23 defeat at Dewsbury
633	Bill Payne	1 September 1962	30 September 1966	Prop	147	1	2	0	7				In 1965 Lancashire Cup final win over Rochdale
237	Alfred Peacock	23 August 1919	23 November 1929	Hooker	367	10	0	0	30				
808	John Peake	9 April 1980	21 November 1982	Second-row	7	0	0	0	0				
429	Ossie Peake	2 April 1938	13 November 1948	Centre	118	48	0	0	144				From Newton (-le-Willows?) Grammar School
976	Michael Pechey	2 August 1998	27 September 1998	Centre	9	2	0	0	8				Australian, signed from Bedford Blues (RU)
753	Mike Peers	31 March 1974	2 September 1979	Loose forward	55	2	0	2	8				Moved on to Swinton
86	… Pemberton	29 December 1900	30 November 1901	Forward	9	0	0	0	0				
87	… Pennington	29 December 1900	29 December 1900	Forward	1	0	0	0	0				Made only appearance in a 3–2 win at Rochdale
1045	Dave Pennington	26 October 2003	26 October 2003	Fullback	1	0	0	0	0				Signed from Crosfields, played in last match at Wilderspool
1071	Kevin Penny	17 September 2006	1 July 2017	Wing	93	63	0	0	252				Electrifying, Great Britain call-up at end of first season (2009). Two spells, namely, 2006-09 & 2014-17. Debut v St Helens
910	Lee Penny	13 October 1992	7 September 2003	Fullback	275	100	0	0	400				Made a habit of scoring tries against Leeds
274	Frank Percival	31 December 1921	7 April 1923	Fullback	2	0	1	0	2				Signed from Crosfields
878	Ian Percival	10 April 1988	10 April 1988	Forward	1	1	0	0	4				Signed from (Farnworth?) Ring o'Bells ARLFC
337	Les Perkins	8 October 1927	19 March 1934	Centre	176	48	2	3	154	©			Father of Ray Perkins, Welsh, captain of the 1929 Lancashire Cup winners
550	Ray Perkins	17 October 1953	22 September 1955	Wing, Centre	8	2	0	0	6				Son of Les Perkins, moved to Blackpool Borough
837	Barry Peters	26 February 1984	29 October 1989	Centre	64	19	0	0	36				Brother of Steve Peters signed from Blackbrook ARLFC, moved to Swinton
994	Mike Peters	4 June 2000	17 September 2000	Wing, Second-row	14	1	0	0	4				Signed from Halifax
858	Steve Peters	31 March 1986	15 March 1987	Scrum-half	14	0	0	0	0				Brother of Barry Peters, signed from St Helens , moved to Oldham
264	James Phibbs	27 August 1921	27 August 1921	Hooker	1	0	0	0	0				Played against Broughton on opening day of 1921–22 season
750	Barry Philbin	3 February 1974	12 April 1978	Loose forward	91	14	0	2	45				
1112	Joe Philbin	13 June 2014	present	Loose forward, Second-row, Prop	252	17	0	0	68			Great Britain, England & Ireland	Signed from Culcheth Eagles/Latchford Albion. Debut v Hull KR
739	Mike Philbin	17 March 1973	10 October 1976	Wing	61	27	0	0	81				Wembley winger in 1974 and 1975, older brother of Barry Philbin
618	Ivor Phillips	28 August 1961	12 April 1963	Centre	8	2	0	0	6				Signed from St Ives RUFC (more likely Cornwall, than Hunts & Peterborough County Rugby Union)
904	Rowland Phillips	13 October 1990	21 August 1994	Forward	50	6	0	0	24				Signed from Neath RFC, 1991 Regal Trophy winner
540	Syd Phillips	25 October 1952	20 October 1956	Second-row	95	9	1	0	29				Championship winner in 1955
609	Joe Pickavance	16 April 1960	27 October 1967	Centre	196	39	0	0	117				Played in 1961 Championship Final, 1965 Lancashire Cup winner
742	Roy Pickersgill	23 April 1973	9 April 1975	Second-row	6	0	0	0	0				Signed from Woolston Rovers, father of Steve Pickersgill
1059	Steve Pickersgill	11 March 2005	14 August 2009	Prop	36	1	0	0	4				England Academy, product of Crosfields, son of Roy Pickersgill
740	Billy Pickup	17 March 1973	28 January 1975	Centre	77	17	0	0	51				Signed from Huddersfield, 1974 Challenge Cup winner
292	W. Pierce	17 November 1923	21 November 1925	Stand-off	5	2	0	0	6				
536	Jonty Pilkington	22 March 1952	21 April 1952	Prop	8	0	0	0	0				Signed from St Helens , moved to Liverpool City
490	Albert Pimblett	27 September 1947	25 March 1950	Centre	98	40	0	0	120				
719	Keith Pitman	27 August 1971	26 November 1971	Wing, Centre	11	1	7	0	17				Guest from Te Tatu (sic Te Atatu?) club (Te Atatu Roosters), New Zealand, only try against New Zealand (later New Zealand convenor of selectors)
836	Pat Poasa	4 December 1983	20 January 1985	Prop	19	5	0	0	20				Massive Maori from West End club, New Zealand. 6 ft 3in, 17st
169	James Polson	3 September 1910	18 February 1911	Forward	17	2	0	0	6				Welsh, from Treorchy (Treorchy RFC?)
1137	Ben Pomeroy	7 July 2017	14 September 2017	Centre	12	4	0	0	16				Australian. Début v Leigh Leopards
220	Fred Potter	18 January 1919	5 April 1920	Centre/Forward	19	4	0	0	12				Played in first game after World War I
771	Ian Potter	30 November 1975	20 September 1981	Loose forward	132	8	0	0	24				
221	William Potter	18 January 1919	6 September 1920	Centre, Stand-off	31	5	28	0	71				Played in first game after World War I
833	Wayne Poutama	10 April 1983	10 April 1983	Scrum-half	1	0	0	0	0				Maori, from Takahiwai (Warriors?) club, New Zealand, guest player
194	Harold Povey	9 December 1912	9 December 1912	Wing	1	0	0	0	0				Made only appearance against Wakefield Trinity at Wilderspool
1202	Sam Powell	17 February 2024	present	Stand-off, Scrum-half, Hooker	63	4	0	0	16				
455	Stanley Powell	25 December 1940	1 January 1949	Left wing	29	5	21	0	57				
483	Eddie Prescott	18 January 1947	10 April 1950	Stand-off	8	2	0	0	6				Signed from Keighley
252	John "Jack" Harrison Prescott	28 August 1920	27 December 1921	Stand-off	50	7	0	0	21	©			Captain of Warrington's first Lancashire Cup winners in 1921
123	Jack Preston	10 September 1904	28 September 1907	Forward	103	14	89	0	220			England & Lancashire	
27	… Price	28 September 1895	28 September 1895	Scrum-half	1	0	0	0	0				Made only appearance in 14–6 defeat at Leigh
656	Joe Price	18 September 1965	18 September 1977	Forward	175	13	0	0	39				Once banned for 11 months
548	Ray Price	29 August 1953	27 April 1957	Stand-off	113	23	0	0	69				
531	Ike Proctor	13 October 1951	21 April 1952	Centre	24	1	0	0	3				New Zealander, signed from Leeds
475	Mike Quick	23 February 1946	28 September 1946	Centre	12	6	25	0	68				Former RAF bomber pilot, signed from RU
45	Phil Radford	26 September 1896	4 December 1897	Wing	11	2	0	0	6				Transferred to Leigh
362	Bill Rankin	18 April 1930	28 August 1937	Prop	75	1	6	0	15				Played in 1937 Championship Final defeat, sold to Rochdale
1097	Stefan Ratchford	5 February 2012	13 September 2025	Fullback, Stand-off, Centre, Scrum-half	359	95	650	2	1682	©		England	Signed from Salford, Wembley winner in first season. Debut v Hull FC
71	Ernest Ratcliffe	25 January 1896	11 October 1902	Fullback, Wing, Centre	21	1	2	0	7				Transferred to St Helens in January 1904
452	Kevin Ratcliffe	26 October 1940	18 May 1946	Wing	19	5	0	0	15				Transferred to Widnes
514	Peter Ratcliffe	31 December 1949	27 March 1954	Wing	4	0	0	0	0				Transferred to Widnes
852	Alan 'Rambo' Rathbone	1 September 1985	26 April 1987	Second-row	33	3	0	0	12				?
1064	Paul Rauhihi	12 February 2006	13 September 2009	Prop	95	12	0	0	48	©			New Zealander signed from North Queensland Cowboys, club captain
813	Tom Rawlinson	6 April 1981	20 March 1984	Halfback	13	0	0	0	0				Signed from Simms Cross, moved to Runcorn Highfield
375	Steve Ray	30 January 1932	30 December 1933	Wing	64	45	0	0	135				
58	… Raynor	12 March 1898	12 March 1898	Wing	1	0	0	0	0				Made only appearance in a 0–2 defeat by Runcorn
890	Kevin Rea	16 April 1989	22 September 1991	Halfback	2	0	0	0	0				Signed from Millom ARLFC
1065	Stuart Reardon	12 February 2006	10 May 2008	Fullback	48	11	0	0	44				Injury-prone, signed from Bradford, moved to Hull
1015	Alan Reddicliffe	16 September 2001	16 September 2001	Wing	1	0	0	0	0				Moved on to Chorley
286	Chris Redmond	3 February 1923	15 March 1924	Centre	35	3	10	0	29				Former Widnes, featured in Pinnacle cigarette cards
299	Rhys Rees	2 February 1924	24 January 1925	Centre	30	5	0	0	15				Signed from Hull Kingston Rovers
568	Martin Regan	29 August 1956	4 March 1961	Stand-off	64	14	15	0	72				England RU player who signed for Warrington on a 5-year deal
183	Bert Renwick	9 December 1911	23 November 1913	Centre	58	9	42	0	111	©			Kiwi (not New Zealand national rugby league team), captain of 1913 Challenge Cup final team
720	Frank Reynolds	27 August 1971	14 December 1975	Centre	89	16	0	0	48				Welsh, from Aberavon RFC, in 1975 Challenge Cup final team.
329	Billy Rhodes	18 December 1926	30 March 1929	Wing, Centre	80	31	73	0	239				
1227	Tommy Rhodes	6 February 2026	present	Stand-off, Scrum-half	1	1	0	0	4				Début against Sheffield Eagles in the Challenge Cup
886	Basil Richards	8 January 1989	25 April 1993	Forward	42	4	0	0	16				Signed from Queensbury ARLFC, moved to Huddersfield
487	Bill 'Spiv' Riley	30 August 1947	26 December 1949	Prop	88	8	0	0	24				Championship-winning player signed from Liverpool Stanley, Spiv ≈ Black market Salesman
1061	Chris Riley	12 August 2005	27 April 2014	Wing	182	120	0	0	480				Signed from Woolston Rovers, three times Wembley winner
500	Frank Riley	27 November 1948	24 April 1950	Second-row	8	2	0	0	6				Signed from St Helens , moved to Liverpool City
1106	Glenn Riley	21 April 2013	18 July 2014	Prop	17	1	0	0	4				Cumbrian, product of Wath Brow Hornets. Debut v Keighley Cougars in the Challenge Cup
441	J. Riley	22 March 1940	18 May 1940	Second-row	6	1	0	0	3				Scored his only try against Barrow at Wilderspool
447	J. Ritchie	7 September 1940	7 September 1940	Second-row	1	0	0	0	0				Only appearance in 3–2 defeat at Wigan
1027	Leroy Rivett	19 April 2002	22 June 2002	Wing	9	1	0	0	4				Who won Lance Todd Trophy with Leeds in 1999
971	Jason Roach	15 February 1998	29 August 1999	Wing	41	21	0	0	84				Scored four tries on his début at Wakefield Trinity Wildcats
881	Steve 'Blocker' Roach	11 September 1988	25 March 1989	Prop	20	1	0	0	4				Played in 1989 Challenge Cup semi-final
265	B. Roberts	27 August 1921	5 September 1921	Wing	3	0	0	0	0				Played in three defeats at start of 1921–22 season (also referenced as T. Roberts)
444	Bob Roberts	30 March 1940	28 December 1940	Forward	12	3	0	0	9				Widnes player who guested for Warrington during World War II
838	Mark Roberts	20 March 1984	17 September 1989	Second-row	133	51	0	0	204				Premiership Trophy winner in 1986
98	R. Roberts	26 February 1902	14 February 1903	Forward	26	2	0	0	6				Played in the Northern Union's 15-a-side days
306	T. W . 'Fanny' Roberts	6 December 1924	18 January 1930	Wing	117	54	0	0	162				Played in 1926 Championship Final defeat, 21 tries that season
1140	Tyrone Roberts	1 February 2018	13 October 2018	Stand-off, Scrum-half, Hooker	33	6	43	2	112				Australian
47	H. Robey	17 October 1896	5 February 1898	Forward	29	0	0	0	0				
270	Arthur T. Robinson	24 September 1921	27 March 1926	Second-row, Loose forward	70	6	0	0	18				Product of Warrington's 'A' team.
570	Alan Robinson	20 September 1956	18 April 1961	Prop	7	0	0	0	0				Suffered a broken leg 15 minutes into his début
651	Geoff Robinson	6 February 1965	25 October 1966	Second-row	36	3	0	0	9				
245	Harry Robinson	21 February 1920	9 October 1920	Loose forward	16	2	0	0	6				
377	J. Robinson	25 March 1932	15 October 1932	Centre	11	1	0	0	3				Scored his only try in a 30–15 win against Wigan at Wilderspool
604	Roy Robinson	28 November 1959	30 April 1960	Second-row, Loose forward	17	0	0	0	0				
317	W. Robinson	3 October 1925	23 January 1926	Prop, Hooker	2	0	0	0	0				
1164	Ellis Robson	4 September 2020	27 March 2022	Prop, Second-row, Loose forward	9	0	0	0	0				Début against Hull FC in Round 11, came off the bench
680	Ian Robson	17 February 1968	16 March 1968	Second-row	6	0	0	0	0				Australian, from Ipswich club in Queensland
947	Carl Roden	9 February 1997	21 March 1997	Hooker	3	0	0	0	0				Transferred to Workington
1023	Matthew Rodwell	10 February 2002	12 May 2002	Scrum-half	12	3	0	0	12	©			Signed from Penrith, Captain under Steve Anderson
1167	Nathan Roebuck	29 September 2020	29 September 2020	Wing	1	1	0	0	4				Made his only appearance on the wing in Round 14 v Salford Red Devils
222	L. Rogerson	18 January 1919	1 February 1919	Centre, Loose forward	2	0	0	0	0				
314	G. D. Rollings	26 September 1925	26 September 1925	Hooker	1	0	0	0	0				Made only appearance against Barrow at Wilderspool
862	Joe Ropati	12 October 1986	19 November 1989	Centre	69	35	0	0	140				
916	Jon Roper	22 March 1994	30 June 2000	Centre	131	51	83	0	370				Cumbrian, 1993 Academy Cup winner, 1996 Great Britain tour
868	Mark Roskell	11 March 1987	22 April 1990	Hooker	62	5	0	0	20				Signed from Millom, 1989 Lancashire Cup winner
417	John Rothwell	10 October 1936	14 September 1946	Forward	19	1	0	0	3				Signed from Barnes ARLFC, sold to Rochdale Hornets
569	Syd Roane	15 September 1956	15 September 1956	Second-row	1	0	0	0	0				Made only appearance at Leeds
883	Chris Rudd	5 October 1988	18 September 1998	Centre	169	43	112	0	396				Cumbrian, from Kells ARLFC, unlucky with injuries
296	H. Rudd	1 December 1923	1 December 1923	Centre	1	0	0	0	0				Made only appearance against Leigh at Wilderspool
198	James Ruddick	28 April 1913	4 April 1914	Wing, Scrum-half	28	5	0	0	15				Signed from Coventry
187	H. Rushton	2 September 1912	15 February 1913	Scrum-half	15	1	0	0	3				Signed from Halifax, scored his only try at Runcorn
1111	Matty Russell	9 March 2014	27 April 2024	Fullback	112	34	0	0	136			Scotland	Former Wigan, signed from Gold Coast. Two spells, namely, 2014-18 & 2023-24. Debut v London Broncos
384	Norman Rutledge	30 September 1933	2 May 1936	Centre	15	2	0	0	6				Signed in May 1933, transferred to Keighley
508	Andy Ryan	20 August 1949	3 September 1949	Fullback	5	0	0	0	0				
467	Bob Ryan	6 October 1945	8 March 1958	Second-row	372	37	0	0	111				
288	Freddie Ryder	25 August 1923	17 November 1928	Scrum-half	156	41	10	1	145	©			Captain who later joined the coaching staff
506	Ron Ryder	15 April 1949	8 May 1954	Centre	161	51	0	0	153				
267	J. Rynn	3 September 1921	3 September 1921	Centre	1	1	0	0	3				Try-scoring début in a 24–10 defeat at Barrow
468	Tommy Sale	6 October 1945	18 May 1946	Centre, Stand-off	7	1	0	0	3	©			
859	Gary 'The Hoover' Sanderson	6 April 1986	12 May 1995	Second-row	236	14	0	0	56				
1120	Chris Sandow	7 August 2015	8 October 2016	Halfback	31	12	26	1	101				Australian, big signing from Parramatta Eels. Debut v Leeds Rhinos
11	Jack Sankey	7 September 1895	14 September 1895	Forward	2	0	0	0	0				Played in first Northern Union game against Hunslet
12	W. Saunders	7 September 1895	28 April 1898	Forward	29	0	0	0	0				Played against Hunslet in Warrington's first Northern Union game
28	G. Savage	28 September 1895	12 September 1896	Forward	3	0	0	0	0				
1131	Andre Savelio	11 February 2017	23 September 2017	Prop, Second-row	26	9	0	0	36				Debut v Catalans Dragons
1046	Dave Saxon	26 October 2003	26 October 2003	Unknown	1	0	0	0	0				Played in last game at Wilderspool against New Zealand 'A', occasionally misspelled as Dave Saxton
660	Tony Scahill	5 February 1966	15 January 1971	Stand-off	39	0	0	0	0				Signed from Warrington Colts
39	J. Scholtze	28 December 1895	21 September 1901	Forward	111	0	0	0	0				Played in Warrington's first Challenge Cup final in 1901
818	Alan Scott	17 October 1981	3 March 1985	Scrum-half	45	5	2	1	21				Signed from Wigan St Patrick's, Warrington's young Player of Year 81–82
282	Bob Scott	9 December 1922	14 April 1923	Fullback	17	3	0	1	11				Cumbrian, signed from Aspatria RUFC, sold to St Helens
40	E. Scott	28 December 1895	29 December 1900	Fullback, Halfback	18	2	0	0	6				
923	Paul 'Scully' Sculthorpe	26 March 1995	5 September 1997	Loose forward	78	17	0	1	69				8 Great Britain caps while at Warrington, sold to St Helens for £370,000
331	Charlie Seeling Jr.	16 April 1927	24 February 1934	Loose forward	195	41	0	0	123				Warrington's top try-scoring Loose forward with 37, sold to Wigan
369	Bill Shankland	29 August 1931	15 April 1938	Centre	231	74	70	0	362				
848	Glyn Shaw	25 November 1984	3 November 1985	Forward	21	3	0	0	12				Signed from Wigan, former Widnes and Wales RU
204	John Shaw	17 January 1914	17 January 1914	Centre	1	0	0	0	0				
907	Kelly Shelford	6 October 1991	5 September 1997	Stand-off, Loose forward	180	44	1	8	186				Creative kingpin of side
1169	Kyle Shelford	29 September 2020	present	Hooker, Loose forward	1	0	0	0	0				Made his only appearance v Salford Red Devils
679	Geoff Shelton	3 February 1968	15 November 1968	Centre	17	0	0	0	0				
518	Bill Sheridan	11 April 1950	19 April 1954	Scrum-half	38	8	0	0	24				Wigan-born, Gerry Helme's understudy
120	C. Short	26 April 1904	7 January 1905	Wing	7	1	0	0	3				Local player, scored his only try in a 10–0 win at Halifax
152	… Shortt	3 October 1908	3 October 1908	Forward	1	0	0	0	0				Made only appearance in a 7–14 defeat at Salford
502	Bill Shreeve	29 January 1949	29 January 1949	Prop	1	0	0	0	0				Signed from Halifax amateur RL, joined Bradford Northern
122	Frank Shugars	3 September 1904	27 March 1912	Forward	212	18	0	0	54			Great Britain, Wales, Other Nationalities & Lancashire	
482	R. Shuttleworth	16 November 1946	21 May 1947	Loose forward	7	1	0	0	3				Scored his only try against Salford at Wilderspool
985	Ian Sibbit	7 July 1999	17 September 2004	Centre	93	30	0	0	120				Academy product, spent a season with Melbourne Storm
75	Albert Siddall	1 April 1899	9 September 1899	Centre	3	0	0	0	0				Signed from St Helens (previously at St Helens Recreation RLFC, and either; Rochdale St. Clements, or Rochdale Hornets), played three, lost three
289	Bill Siddall	25 August 1923	25 April 1925	Wing, Stand-off	35	11	10	0	53				
592	Nat Silcock Jr.	4 September 1958	18 April 1961	Prop	111	11	0	0	33				
391	Fred Simcock	2 April 1934	15 December 1934	Wing	10	3	0	0	9				Signed from Castner Kellner RUFC (Castner–Kellner Co.) in Runcorn, sold to Widnes
1116	Ashton Sims	7 February 2015	23 September 2017	Prop	97	7	0	0	28			Captain of Fiji	Signed from North Queensland Cowboys. Debut v Salford Red Devils
122?	Toafofoa Sipley	13 February 2026	present	Prop	4	1	0	0	4				Début v St Helens in Round 1
176	Arthur Skelhorn	28 January 1911	21 March 1925	Forward	259	49	1	0	149				Name often misspelled as Arthur Skelhorne
315	John Richard Skelhorn	26 September 1925	26 September 1925	Loose forward	1	0	0	0	0				Made only appearance at Wilderspool to Barrow, name often misspelled as John Richard Skelhorne
649	G. Smart	14 November 1964	14 November 1964	Hooker	1	0	0	0	0				Made only appearance at Wilderspool to Wakefield Trinity
294	Arthur Smith	24 November 1923	12 January 1924	Centre	7	0	0	0	0				From Cumberland
381	Bob Smith	28 January 1933	27 October 1934	Second-row	53	6	0	0	18				Played in 1933 Challenge Cup final, two caps for Lancashire
607	Danny Smith	23 January 1960	23 January 1960	Centre	1	0	0	0	0				Signed from Rochdale Hornets
1220	Ewan Smith	29 August 2025	present	Second-row	2	2	0	0	8				Début v Salford Red Devils
233	Frank Smith	15 February 1919	11 September 1920	Second-row	18	1	0	0	3				Scored his only try against Widnes at Wilderspool
510	Gerry Smith	19 November 1949	15 March 1952	Scrum-half	5	0	0	0	0				
164	H. S. Smith	8 January 1910	8 January 1910	Wing	1	0	0	0	0				Made only appearance against Ebbw Vale RLFC at Wilderspool
629	John Smith	10 March 1962	30 September 1966	Scrum-half	63	8	0	0	24				Played in 1965 Lancashire Cup final win against Rochdale
1225	Josh Smith	6 February 2026	present	Centre, Wing	7	3	0	0	12				Australian. Début v Sheffield Eagles in the Challenge Cup
79	Llandaff Smith	2 December 1899	19 February 1900	Centre	9	0	0	0	0				Welsh, signed from Wigan, former Penarth RFC (RU)
1156	Matty Smith	8 August 2019	13 September 2019	Scrum-half	5	0	0	0	0				On loan from Catalans Dragons
1129	Morgan Smith	7 May 2016	28 September 2018	Halfback	26	2	1	0	10				England Academy, signed from Leeds Rhinos in 2014. Debut v Oldham RLFC in the Challenge Cup Round 6
1006	Paul Smith	12 August 2001	12 August 2001	Second-row	1	0	0	0	0				Signed on loan from Dewsbury (Swinton Lions?)
714	Ron Smith	6 August 1971	28 September 1975	Centre, Second-row	20	2	0	0	6				
995	Rob Smyth	23 July 2000	27 July 2003	Wing	72	38	27	0	206				Former Wigan, scored four tries on his Warrington Wolves début
1214	Marc Sneyd	21 March 2025	present	Stand-off, Scrum-half	28	1	81	2	168				Début v St Helens in Round 5
1091	David Solomona	7 February 2010	9 September 2012	Second-row	65	19	1	0	78				New Zealand international signed from Bradford. Debut v Harlequins RL
703	Colin Standing	5 December 1970	5 December 1970	Second-row	1	0	0	0	0				
387	H. Starkey	1 January 1934	29 December 1934	Fullback, Centre	2	0	0	0	0				Made début at Rochdale Hornets
261	James Starkey	26 March 1921	2 April 1921	Centre	3	0	0	0	0				
297	J. Starkey	8 December 1923	19 April 1924	Prop	3	0	0	0	0				
997	Jamie Stenhouse	25 August 2000	29 July 2001	Wing	16	4	0	0	16				Signed from Crosfields ARLFC
829	Gary Stephens	20 March 1983	13 April 1983	Scrum-half	7	1	0	0	3				Former Castleford, signed on loan from Wigan
553	Arnold Stevens	2 January 1954	3 January 1959	Centre	14	3	0	0	9				Played in drawn 1954 Challenge Cup final at Wembley
333	Charles Stevens	30 April 1927	30 April 1927	Stand-off	1	0	1	0	2				Played at Oldham on the last day of 1926–27 season
945	Warren Stevens	4 May 1996	2 April 2005	Prop	97	2	0	0	8				GB Academy, Paul Cullen's first signing
303	Bill Stockley	4 October 1924	12 September 1925	Wing	13	4	0	0	12				Scored a hat-trick of tries on his Warrington début
1217	Sam Stone	21 June 2025	present	Second-row	18	6	0	0	24				Australian. Début v Huddersfield Giants in Round 15
345	J. Storey	18 February 1928	18 February 1928	Left wing	1	0	0	0	0				Played in an 11–10 victory over Hunslet at Wilderspool
576	Tony Storey	19 January 1957	19 April 1958	Prop	37	7	0	0	21				
311	Charlie Stowell	18 April 1925	18 April 1925	Centre	1	0	0	0	0				Signed from Warrington Rangers
163	Johnno Stuntz	4 December 1909	2 April 1910	Wing	19	13	0	0	39				Australian
1024	Matthew 'Sturminator' Sturm	10 February 2002	12 April 2004	Prop, Second-row	21	0	0	0	0				New Zealander
597	Maurice Sudell	14 March 1959	14 March 1959	Scrum-half	1	0	0	0	0				Made only appearance against Whitehaven
42	J. Sudlow	28 March 1896	20 January 1900	Forward	37	1	0	0	3				Scored his only try against Salford at Wilderspool
1066	Michael Sullivan	12 February 2006	15 July 2007	Scrum-half, Hooker	42	10	1	0	42				Australian signed from Cronulla
882	Phil 'Sumo' Sumner	2 October 1988	25 May 1996	Prop	65	3	0	0	12				Signed from Wigan St Patrick's, Great Britain Under-21
612	B. Sutcliffe	26 April 1960	26 April 1960	Second-row	1	0	0	0	0				Made only appearance at Rochdale
744	Dave Sutton	27 August 1973	17 April 1980	Wing	67	11	0	0	33				Warrington-born, product of Warrington Colts team
1011	Anthony Swann	26 August 2001	9 September 2001	Centre	3	1	0	0	4				Taken on loan from New Zealand Warriors
1057	Logan Swann	13 February 2005	30 September 2006	Second-row, Loose forward	52	20	0	0	80				Kiwi international signed from Bradford Bulls
942	Willie Swann	12 May 1996	5 September 1997	Scrum-half	37	13	0	0	52				Western Samoan signed from Auckland Warriors
13	Fred Swift	7 September 1895	5 September 1903	Forward	123	2	1	1	11				Scored Warrington's first Challenge Cup try in 1897
63	Jack Swift	7 September 1895	23 April 1904	Forward	134	2	0	0	6				Played in Warrington's first Challenge Cup final in 1901
91	Walter Swift	7 September 1901	12 September 1908	Forward	102	5	0	0	15				Played in Warrington's first Challenge Cup win in 1905
206	Jonathan Taberner	28 March 1914	10 April 1915	Wing	19	5	5	0	25				Also made one friendly appearance in 1916
1204	Rodrick Tai	23 March 2024	4 July 2025	Centre, Wing	41	13	0	0	52			Papua New Guinea	Début v London Broncos in the Challenge Cup
287	William Talbot	10 February 1923	21 April 1923	Wing	12	3	0	0	9				Signed from Wigan & District ARL
853	Kevin 'Terrible' Tamati	1 September 1985	16 April 1989	Hooker	116	6	0	0	24				
1226	Kelepi Tanginoa	6 February 2026	present	Prop, Second-row, Loose forward	6	4	0	0	16				Début v Sheffield Eagles in the Challenge Cup
1150	Lama Tasi	9 February 2019	29 August 2019	Prop, Second-row	18	0	0	0	0				New Zealander. Début v Hull KR
948	Tony Tatupu	9 February 1997	5 September 1997	Second-row	32	7	0	0	28				Signed from Auckland Warriors
305	… Taylor	29 November 1924	29 November 1924	Prop	1	0	0	0	0				Made only appearance in a 5–3 win at Salford
465	George Taylor	15 September 1945	23 August 1947	Second-row, Loose forward	24	1	5	0	13				Scored his only try against Featherstone at Wilderspool, His real name was Jim Holcroft, he was still in the army when he played for Warrington and so played under a pseudonym
133	Ike Taylor	20 January 1906	1 January 1912	Centre	160	41	0	5	133				Signed from Widnes where he played twice for Lancashire against Cumberland, and Yorkshire in the 1904–05 season, played in Warrington's 1907 Challenge Cup final victory over Oldham
14	Jack Taylor	7 September 1895	27 December 1902	Forward	181	14	8	1	62				Played in Warrington's first Challenge Cup final in 1901
693	Paul Taylor	20 September 1969	28 December 1969	Centre	10	0	0	0	0				Australian, from Cronulla Sutherland club
780	Peter Taylor	19 September 1976	11 November 1979	Wing	13	0	0	0	0				
450	R. M. Taylor	21 September 1940	28 December 1940	Forward	11	1	0	0	3				Scored his only try against Oldham at Wilderspool
1205	Cai Taylor-Wray	1 June 2024	present	Fullback	15	9	0	0	36				Début v Wigan Warriors
905	Gary Tees	2 December 1990	12 May 1995	Prop	85	4	0	0	16				Cumbrian, signed from Barrow, at his best in 1994–95
912	Craig Teitzel	12 September 1993	17 April 1994	Prop	27	4	0	0	16				Unspectacular Australian signed from Illawarra
657	John Tembey	23 October 1965	23 March 1966	Prop	13	0	0	0	0				
807	Rick Thackray	4 April 1980	22 October 1992	Wing	133	45	0	0	157				Signed from Warrington RU, 1 Great Britain Under-24 cap against New Zealand
1206	Jake Thewlis	1 June 2024	present	Wing	20	16	0	0	64				Brother of Josh Thewlis. Début v Wigan Warriors
1153	Josh Thewlis	8 June 2019	present	Fullback, Wing	124	60	105	0	450				Brother of Jake Thewlis. Début v Catalans Dragons
111	George 'Ponty' Thomas	5 September 1903	12 September 1914	Forward	385	47	192	7	539			Great Britain, Wales, Other Nationalities & Lancashire	
605	Mal Thomas	12 December 1959	30 April 1966	Second-row	134	25	0	1	77				Signed from Bridgend RFC, 1965 Lancashire Cup winner
889	Mark Thomas	19 March 1989	15 September 1991	Second-row	36	2	0	0	8				Try scorer in 1991 Regal Trophy final victory
191	Richard Thomas ?	5 October 1912	28 April 1913	Forward	25	1	0	0	3				Welsh, from Ebbw Vale (RLFC?), played in 1913 Challenge Cup final
1187	Luke Thomas	19 August 2022	present	Prop	17	1	0	0	4			Wales	Début v Leeds Rhinos
1008	Steve Thomas	17 August 2001	16 September 2001	Wing	2	0	0	0	0				Signed on loan from Leeds
1088	Alex Thompson	13 September 2009	13 September 2009	Second-row	1	1	0	0	4				Try scoring début against Harlequins RL, later played for Crosfields
1145	Bodene Thompson	10 August 2018	13 October 2018	Centre, Prop, Second-row, Loose forward	7	0	0	0	0				Début v Catalans Dragons
599	John Thompson	11 April 1959	26 April 1960	Second-row	9	0	0	0	0				
934	Manoa Thompson	29 November 1995	17 January 1996	Wing, Centre	9	2	0	0	8				6 ft tall 15st Fijian from Auckland Warriors
567	Robin Thompson	18 August 1956	21 February 1959	Forward	50	10	0	0	30				
336	Tommy 'Tubby' Thompson	1 October 1927	30 March 1934	Wing	202	112	14	0	364				
37	J. T. 'Tosh' Thorniley	16 November 1895	23 November 1895	Forward	2	0	0	0	0				From Warrington's union days, discovered Jack Fish
864	Tony 'Too Tall' Thorniley	19 January 1987	27 June 1997	Centre	133	49	26	0	248				Signed from Woolston Rovers, 1991 Regal Trophy winner, 'Too Tall' due to Cervical collar
29	J. Thornton	28 September 1895	4 December 1897	Forward	35	0	0	0	0				
160	… Thoult	10 April 1909	10 April 1909	Forward	1	0	0	0	0				Made his only appearance against Salford at Wilderspool
877	John Thursfield	4 April 1988	17 January 1996	Hooker	68	1	0	0	4				Signed from Woolston rovers, British Coal Nines winner in 1988
1016	Kris Tickle	16 September 2001	16 September 2001	Halfback	1	0	0	0	0				Signed from Saddleworth Rangers ARLFC
140	Jimmy Tilley	29 December 1906	6 April 1912	Fullback	162	6	3	11	46				Played when Warrington won the 1906–07 Challenge Cup
451	Mark Tolson	21 September 1940	28 September 1940	Forward	2	0	0	0	0				Hunslet F.C. player who guested for Warrington during World War II, Boilerman at Prices Tailors Ltd. Garnet Road, Hunslet, and Landlord at The British Oak, West Ardsley
68	W. Townend	31 December 1898	9 September 1899	Forward	11	0	0	0	0				
93	D. Townson	14 December 1901	31 March 1902	Halfback	5	0	0	0	0				
184	James Tranter	16 December 1911	26 December 1928	Centre, Second-row, Loose forward	439	120	0	6	372				Tough tackler
156	Lewis Treharne	31 October 1908	20 March 1909	Wing	20	8	0	0	24				(relative of Edward Treharne?)
1207	Nolan Tupaea	1 June 2024	present	Second-row	1	0	0	0	0				Début v Wigan Warriors
754	Norman Turley	31 March 1974	23 September 1977	Fullback	26	10	48	0	126				Joined Blackpool and became a drop goal king
15	Fair Turner	7 September 1895	14 September 1895	Forward	2	0	0	0	0	©			Played in first Northern Union game, Captain in RU days
453	J. Turner	9 November 1940	14 December 1940	Wing	3	0	0	0	0				Played in War Emergency League
805	Peter Turner	24 October 1979	4 November 1979	Wing	3	0	0	0	0				
875	Robert 'Rocky' Turner	27 October 1987	21 February 1993	Stand-off	86	8	137	2	308				Played in 1989 Lancashire Cup win, 1 Great Britain Under-21 cap
972	Brendon 'The Baby-Face Assassin' Tuuta	15 February 1998	27 September 1998	Second-row, Loose forward	22	4	0	0	16				Former Castleford player tempted out of retirement
188	J. Twist	14 September 1912	21 September 1912	Wing	2	0	0	0	0				Played two games at Wilderspool
166	Robert "Bob" Unsworth	28 March 1910	1 January 1912	Centre	26	2	0	0	6				Signed from Runcorn, scored a try on his Warrington début
949	Nigel Vagana	9 February 1997	5 September 1997	Centre	30	22	0	0	88				Signed from Auckland Warriors, leading try scorer in 1997
1047	Richard Varkulis	26 October 2003	2 May 2004	Wing, Centre	7	4	0	0	16				BARLA Young Lion, signed from Leigh Miners
1193	Paul Vaughan	16 February 2023	8 August 2025	Prop	78	9	0	0	36				Début v Leeds Rhinos in Round 1
330	Bill Vowles	8 January 1927	5 March 1927	Right wing	7	1	0	0	3				Signed from Bradford Northern in exchange for Eddie 'Ned' Catterall
919	Mike Wainwright	25 September 1994	30 June 2007	Second-row, Loose forward	229	30	0	0	120				Signed from Woolston Rovers, two spells with Warrington
339	Tom Waldron	12 November 1927	6 September 1930	Halfback	4	0	0	0	0				Signed from local amateur RL, transferred to Widnes
1149	Danny Walker	2 February 2019	present	Hooker	155	20	0	0	80			England	Début v Leeds Rhinos off the bench
239	George Walker	13 September 1919	30 October 1926	Centre, Second-row	65	13	2	0	43				Featured in Pinnacle cigarette cards
766	Tony Waller	21 September 1975	28 March 1982	Hooker	116	7	0	5	26				Man of the match in 1980 Lancashire Cup win
797	Joe Walsh	8 October 1978	13 April 1979	Left wing	10	1	0	0	3				Made full (starting) début in 1978 team who beat Australia
1003	Kevin Walters	11 February 2001	11 March 2001	Stand-off	4	1	0	0	4				Australian, ex-Brisbane Broncos, did not settle at Wilderspool
722	Bobby Wanbon	12 September 1971	1 February 1978	Forward	163	22	0	0	66				
44	… Warburton	12 September 1896	24 February 1903	Forward	4	0	0	0	0				
544	John Warburton	22 November 1952	4 April 1957	Prop	20	0	0	0	0				
1048	Steve Warburton	26 October 2003	26 October 2003	Centre	1	1	0	0	4				Woolston Rovers, try-scorer in last game at Wilderspool
1183	Jake Wardle	3 July 2022	3 September 2022	Centre, Wing	11	6	0	0	24			England	On loan from Huddersfield Giants
517	Ged Waring	8 April 1950	23 April 1951	Prop, Second-row	4	0	0	0	0				Signed from St Helens , brother of Jack Waring
497	Jack Waring	9 October 1948	12 March 1949	Centre	2	1	0	0	3				
146	Evan Watkins	8 February 1908	17 April 1908	Wing	9	5	0	0	15				(spelling Evan Watkin? ★)
1098	Trent Waterhouse	5 February 2012	3 October 2014	Second-row	82	19	0	0	76				Australian Test player signed from Penrith Panthers. Debut v Hull FC
943	Kris Watson	31 May 1996	26 August 1996	Hooker	13	2	0	0	8				Australian signed from Newcastle Knights
1030	Michael Watts	19 May 2002	2 June 2002	Fullback	3	0	0	0	0				Signed on loan from Chorley
171	Jack Waywell	26 September 1910	22 November 1919	Wing	98	26	0	0	78				Leading try-scorer in 1913–14 season with 9, Died aged 65 ?. Surname incorrectly spelled as Maynell in press report of the match on 24 March 1913, so occasionally incorrectly appears as two separate players.
691	Bob Wear	23 August 1969	20 September 1969	Wing	7	1	0	0	3				On loan from Barrow, played for Cumberland
785	Dave Weavill	10 October 1976	23 September 1977	Prop	34	3	0	0	9				Signed from Huddersfield, moved to Halifax
398	Bob Webb	17 November 1934	23 November 1935	Forward	12	0	0	0	0				Signed from Manchester Ship Canal ARLFC
812	Carl Webb	29 March 1981	13 March 1988	Hooker	128	12	0	0	44				Signed from Crosfields, 1982 Lancashire Cup winner
681	Ian Webster	6 September 1968	21 November 1971	Second-row	13	0	0	0	0				Signed from Warrington Colts
1083	Taylor Welch	24 August 2008	24 August 2008	Wing	1	0	0	0	0				American-born spotted at Lymm High School. Debut v Castleford Tigers
735	Ray Wells	12 November 1972	25 February 1973	Wing, Utility	8	0	0	0	0				Signed from Crosfields, début at Whitehaven day after getting married, two tries disallowed
390	Eric Welsby	3 March 1934	30 August 1939	Second-row	104	8	0	1	26				Kicked drop goal in 1937 Championship Final
899	Mike Wernham	8 April 1990	8 April 1990	Fullback	1	0	1	0	2				Signed from Lymm RUFC
1125	Joe Westerman	4 February 2016	9 September 2017	Loose forward	53	12	0	0	48				Signed from Hull FC for £150,000, joined Toronto Wolfpack. Debut v Leeds Rhinos
1033	Ben Westwood	22 June 2002	19 September 2019	Second-row	446	129	83	0	682			England	Human wrecking ball, won three Challenge Cups
692	Jim Wharton	26 August 1969	22 March 1970	Prop	5	0	0	0	0				Signed from Leigh
762	Paul Wharton	10 January 1975	20 April 1975	Wing	11	6	5	0	28				Former RU, scored hat-trick against Halifax in Challenge Cup
273	Stan Wheatley	27 December 1921	13 November 1926	Stand-off	57	2	27	0	60				Product of Warrington's 'A' team
1117	Gary Wheeler	7 February 2015	3 March 2016	Centre, Stand-off	12	4	0	0	16				Snapped up after being released by St Helens. Debut v Salford Red Devils
307	Harry Whitcombe	6 December 1924	24 January 1925	Forward	9	1	0	0	3				Signed from Warwick RFC
535	Ted White	12 January 1952	26 September 1959	Second-row	134	18	0	0	54				Signed from Orford Tannery, broke leg in 1954 Challenge Cup semi-final
694	Derek Whitehead	4 October 1969	13 May 1979	Fullback	274	18	713	21	1519				
1190	Tom Whitehead	3 September 2022	23 May 2025	Second-row, Loose forward	11	1	0	0	4				Début v Salford Red Devils off the bench
526	Joe Whittaker	18 August 1951	2 February 1952	Second-row, Loose forward	14	2	0	0	6				
789	John Whittaker	23 April 1977	4 May 1981	Prop	54	4	0	0	12				Signed from Leigh Miners.
922	Damian Whitter	22 January 1995	22 January 1995	Unknown	1	0	0	0	0				Signed from Wigan St Patricks, moved to Workington
749	Alan Whittle	15 December 1973	2 November 1975	Stand-off	79	20	3	0	66				
974	Danny Whittle	21 June 1998	9 August 1998	Forward	2	0	0	0	0				Signed from Swinton
1009	Dave Whittle	17 August 2001	31 August 2001	Prop	3	0	0	0	0				Signed on loan from Leigh
128	Arthur Widdeson	25 November 1905	10 March 1906	Wing	16	2	0	0	6				Made a try-scoring début in a 3–12 defeat at Swinton
1160	Gareth Widdop	16 February 2020	10 July 2022	Fullback, Stand-off, Scrum-half	49	20	47	1	175				Début v Wakefield Trinity
30	R. Wilcock	28 September 1895	1 January 1898	Forward	22	3	0	0	9				
240	William Wilcock	8 November 1919	10 January 1920	Wing	3	0	0	0	0				
96	P. Wilcocks	11 January 1902	11 January 1902	Forward	1	0	0	0	0				Made only appearance versus Halifax at Wilderspool
69	J. Wilcox	14 February 1899	11 March 1899	Halfback	3	0	0	0	0				
1119	Sam Wilde	2 July 2015	1 July 2017	Second-row, Loose forward	22	1	0	0	4				Made début in 17–6 win over Wigan at the Halliwell Jones Stadium, live on Sky
72	… Williams	11 March 1899	11 March 1899	Forward	1	0	0	0	0				Made only appearance against Widnes at Wilderspool
271	Frank Williams	12 November 1921	24 February 1934	Second-row	352	87	0	0	261				
1174	George Williams	1 August 2021	present	Stand-off, Scrum-half	110	38	0	6	158			England	Début v Leeds Rhinos
935	Gerald Williams	3 December 1995	3 December 1995	Unknown	1	0	0	0	0				Came on as a substitute against the Sheffield Eagles at Wilderspool
472	Glynn Williams	8 December 1945	12 April 1948	Centre	58	27	0	0	81				Welsh, signed from Blaengarw RFC
357	John Llewlyn Williams	7 September 1929	7 September 1929	Wing	1	0	0	0	0				Made only appearance in heavy defeat at Swinton
1092	Rhys Williams	7 May 2010	21 July 2013	Wing	29	21	0	0	84			Wales	Wrexham-born from Mold RFC, Wales' record try scorer. Début v Celtic Crusaders
1049	Shane Williams	26 October 2003	26 October 2003	Hooker	1	0	0	0	0				Woolston Rovers, played in last game at Wilderspool
456	Steve Williams	28 December 1940	28 December 1940	Wing	1	1	0	0	3				Salford player who appeared against Oldham as a guest player
197	W. J. Williams	25 December 1912	8 February 1913	Wing	8	0	0	0	0				Made début against Leigh on Christmas Day 1912
885	Paul Williamson	3 December 1988	10 December 1993	Centre	37	12	0	0	48				Signed from Woolston Rovers, moved to South Wales club
276	Tommy Wilmot	11 March 1922	4 September 1922	Centre	6	1	0	0	3				Scored his only try versus Salford at Wilderspool
1054	John Wilshere	21 February 2004	22 May 2004	Wing	8	5	6	0	32				Papua New Guinean, signed from St. George Illawarra Dragons, Warrington's first 'Kolpak ruling' signing, moved to Leigh. Debut v Wakefield Trinity
794	Frank Wilson	6 November 1977	24 September 1978	Centre	29	9	0	0	27				
1050	Matty Wilson	26 October 2003	26 October 2003	Centre	1	0	0	0	0				Came on as a substitute against New Zealand 'A' in the last match at Wilderspool
979	Scott Wilson	27 September 1998	5 September 1999	Stand-off	28	8	0	0	32				Australian, signed from Canterbury Bulldogs
956	Paul Wingfield	11 May 1997	22 August 1997	Wing	8	6	1	0	26				Scored two tries on début, product of Academy
626	Charlie Winslade	18 November 1961	2 January 1967	Prop	159	1	0	0	3				
492	W. Winstanley	24 January 1948	24 January 1948	Prop	1	0	0	0	0				Made his only appearance against Swinton at Wilderspool
70	Charlie Wood	18 February 1899	18 November 1900	Wing, Centre	10	1	0	0	3				Scored his only try against Stockport, transferred to Wigan
755	David Wood	31 March 1974	31 March 1974	Halfback	1	1	3	0	9				Signed from West Park St Helens
60	J. W. Wood	28 April 1898	28 April 1898	Wing	1	0	0	0	0				Made his only appearance at Widnes
1203	Max Wood	23 February 2024	present	Prop	29	2	0	0	8				Début v Hull FC off the bench
1034	Nathan Wood	22 June 2002	24 September 2005	Scrum-half	96	43	0	3	175				Australian via Wakefield Trinity Wildcats, scored 1st try at Halliwell Jones Stadium
999	Paul Wood	10 September 2000	25 September 2014	Prop, Second-row	339	49	0	0	196			England	Suffered a ruptured testicle in 2012 Grand Final. Debut v Wakefield Trinity
177	William Woodburn	2 September 1911	2 November 1912	Wing	34	11	2	0	37				Signed from Coventry RLFC, scored two tries on his début
401	H. Woodcock	2 February 1935	12 October 1935	Hooker	6	0	0	0	0				
388	Jack Woods	3 February 1934	31 August 1935	Wing	14	5	0	0	15				
872	John Woods	30 August 1987	9 April 1989	Stand-off	72	25	254	5	613				1 Great Britain cap while at Warrington, Scored 351 points in 1987–88 season
645	Austin Woolvine	22 February 1964	12 November 1966	Hooker	33	0	0	0	0				Signed from Thames Board Mills ARLFC
688	Mick Worrall	15 March 1969	30 March 1970	Second-row	4	0	0	0	0				Signed from Crosfields
802	Tony Worrall	26 August 1979	4 September 1986	Forward	104	3	0	0	11				BARLA forward signed from Crosfields, moved to Salford
174	William Worrall	17 December 1910	17 December 1910	Forward	1	0	0	0	0				Signed from Barrow, made only appearance against St Helens at Wilderspool
298	Jim Worsley	8 December 1923	26 March 1927	Forward	5	0	0	0	0				
1168	Connor Wrench	29 September 2020	24 August 2025	Centre, Wing	52	19	0	0	76				Début v Salford Red Devils off the bench
278	Albert Wright	8 April 1922	6 October 1923	Fullback, Centre	22	0	3	0	6				Featured in Pinnacle cigarette cards
748	Dave Wright	8 December 1973	11 May 1974	Second-row	25	3	0	0	9				Australian, 1974 Challenge Cup winner
549	Frank Wright	19 September 1953	4 October 1958	Hooker	137	16	0	0	48				Double-winning player, signed from Fylde Rugby Club (RU)
527	Gilbert Wright	22 August 1951	20 February 1960	Prop	65	6	9	0	36				Signed from Liverpool, moved to Blackpool Borough
736	Gilly Wright	12 November 1972	28 September 1975	Prop	25	2	0	0	6				Signed from Huyton
1209	Luke Yates	19 July 2024	present	Prop, Hooker, Loose forward	44	0	0	0	0				Australian. Début v St Helens off the bench
834	Mal Yates	4 September 1983	29 April 1984	Prop	23	1	0	0	4				Signed from Salford, died aged 39 in 1997 (born c. 1958) ?
523	Tom Yorke	18 April 1951	21 February 1953	Hooker	9	0	0	0	0				
843	Paul Younane	7 October 1984	21 April 1985	Centre	21	8	0	0	32				
202	Stan Young	29 November 1913	24 April 1915	Scrum-half	60	2	0	0	6				Signed from Abertillery RFC, killed in action in World War I
466	A. N. Other	15 September 1945	15 September 1945	Right wing	1	1	0	0	3				Played against Featherstone at Wilderspool
731	A. N. Other	20 August 1972	20 August 1972	Left-Centre	1	1	0	0	3				Played against Hull at Wilderspool
756	A. N. Other	31 March 1974	31 March 1974	Second-row	1	1	0	0	3				Played in a defeat at Dewsbury
757	A. N. Other	23 August 1974	23 August 1974	Second-row	1	1	0	0	3				Now believed to be Glyn Shaw, therefore he has two heritage numbers
765	A. N. Other	22 August 1975	22 August 1975	Fullback	1	1	0	0	3				Played at Salford on the opening day of the season
781	A. N. Other	19 September 1976	19 September 1976	Prop	1	1	0	0	3				Believed to be Eddie Lyon

== Internationals ==
- John "Jack" Arkwright won caps for England while at St. Helens 1933 Other Nationalities, while at Warrington 1936 France, Wales, 1937 France, 1938 France, and won caps for Great Britain while at Warrington 1936 Australia (2 matches), New Zealand, 1937 Australia (3 matches)
- William "Willie" Aspinall won a cap for Great Britain while at Warrington in 1966 against New Zealand
- Allan Bateman won caps for Wales while at Warrington, Cronulla, and Bridgend Blue Bulls 1991...2003 14-caps 5(6?)-tries 20(24?)-points
- Harry Bath won caps for Other Nationalities while at Warrington 1949–55 10-caps
- William "Billy" Belshaw won caps for England while at Liverpool Stanley 1935 Wales, 1936 Wales, 1937 France, while at Warrington, 1938 France, Wales, 1939 France, Wales, 1940 Wales, 1941 Wales, 1943 Wales, 1945 Wales, and won caps for Great Britain while at Liverpool Stanley 1936 Australia (3 matches), New Zealand (2 matches), 1937 Australia, while at Warrington, 1937 Australia (2 matches)
- Nat Bentham won caps for England while at Wigan Highfield 1928 Wales (2 matches), while at Halifax, 1929 Other Nationalities, while at Warrington 1930 Other Nationalities (2 matches), and won caps for Great Britain while at Wigan Highfield 1928 Australia (3 matches), New Zealand (3 matches), while at Halifax, 1929–30 Australia (2 matches), while at Warrington, Australia (2 matches)
- Andy Bracek won caps for Wales while at Warrington 2007...present 2-caps + 1-cap (sub) 1-try 4-points
- Brian Bevan won caps for Other Nationalities while at Warrington 1949–55 16-caps
- John Bevan won caps for Wales while at Warrington 1975...1982 17-caps 5-tries 15-points (World Cup 1975 4-caps, 2-tries)
- Tom Blinkhorn won caps for England while at Warrington 1929 Other Nationalities, and won caps for Great Britain while at Warrington 1929–30 Australia
- Alfred "Alf" Boardman won caps for England while at Warrington 1905 Other Nationalities
- Lee Briers won caps for Wales while at Warrington 1996...present 19(17?)-caps 9-tries 20-goals (5-drop-goals?) 79(81?)-points
- Ernest "Ernie" Brooks won caps for England while at Warrington 1908 Wales, and won caps for Great Britain while at Warrington 1908–09 Australia (3 matches)
- Dean Busby won caps for Wales while at Warrington 2000(1996...2001?) 6(7?)-caps 1-try 4-points
- Brian Butler won caps for Wales while at Swinton in the 1975 Rugby League World Cup against France, New Zealand, and France, and while at Warrington in 1977 against France
- Brian Case won caps for England while at Warrington 1981 France, and won caps for Great Britain while at Wigan 1984 Australia, New Zealand (3 matches), 1987 Papua New Guinea, 1988 Papua New Guinea, Australia (sub)
- Jim Challinor won caps for Great Britain while at Warrington 1958...1960 3-caps (World Cup 1960 1-cap)
- William G. "Bill" Chapman won caps for Wales while at Warrington 1943...1944 2-caps
- David Chisnall won caps for England while at Warrington 1975 Wales (sub), France, Wales, New Zealand, Papua New Guinea (sub), and won caps for Great Britain while at Leigh 1970 Australia, New Zealand (World Cup 1970 1-cap)
- Neil Courtney won caps for Great Britain while at Warrington 1982
- William "Billy" Cunliffe won caps for England while at Warrington 1921 Wales, Other Nationalities, Australia, 1922 Wales, 1923 Wales (2 matches), 1925 Wales (2 matches), 1926 Wales, Other Nationalities, and won caps for Great Britain while at Warrington 1920 Australia, New Zealand (2 matches), 1921–22 Australia (3 matches), 1924 Australia (3 matches), New Zealand, 1926 New Zealand
- Tommy Cunningham won caps for Wales while at Warrington 1979 (2?)-caps
- Dennis Curling won a cap for Wales while at Warrington 1977 (sub) 1-cap
- David "Dai" Davies won caps for Wales while at Warrington 1928...1935 4-caps
- Gareth Davies won caps for Wales while at Warrington 1996 4-caps
- Jonathan Davies won caps for Wales while at Widnes, and Warrington 1991...1995(1996?) 9(11?)-caps 4-tries 29(39?)-goals (5-drop-goals?) 78(99?)-points
- Ponty Davies won a cap for Wales while at Warrington 1928 1-caps
- William "Billy" Derbyshire won caps for England while at Warrington 1947 Wales
- Melville "Mel" De Lloyd won a cap for Wales while at Warrington 1945 1-cap
- George Dickenson won caps for England while at Warrington 1904 Other Nationalities, 1908 Wales (2 matches), 1909 Australia, and won caps for Great Britain while at 1908 Australia
- Billy Dingsdale won caps for England while at Warrington 1928 Wales, 1929 Other Nationalities, 1930 Wales, Other Nationalities, 1931 Wales, 1932 Wales, 1933 Other Nationalities, and won caps for Great Britain while at Warrington 1929
- William Dowell won a cap for Wales while at Warrington 1908 1-cap
- Desmond "Des" Drummond won caps for England while at Leigh 1980 Wales, France, 1981 France, Wales, 1984 Wales, and won caps for Great Britain while at Leigh 1980 New Zealand (2 matches), 1981 France (2 matches), 1982 Australia (3 matches), 1983 France (2 matches), 1984 France, Australia (3 matches), New Zealand (3 matches), Papua New Guinea, 1985 New Zealand (3 matches), 1986 France (2 matches), while at Warrington 1987 Papua New Guinea, 1988 France
- Ronald "Ronnie" Duane won caps for Great Britain while at Warrington in 1983 against France (2 matches), and in 1984 against France
- Robert "Bob" Eccles won a cap for Great Britain while at Warrington in 1982 against Australia
- Kevin Ellis won caps for Wales while at Warrington in 1991 against Papua New Guinea, in 1992 against France, England, and France, in 1993 against New Zealand, in 1994 against France, and Australia, in 1995 against England, and France, in the 1995 Rugby League World Cup against France, Western Samoa, and England, while at Bridgend Blue Bulls in 2003 against Russia, and Australia, and in 2004 against Ireland, and won a cap for Great Britain while at Warrington in 1991 against France
- Candy Evans won caps for Wales (RU) while at Pontypool RFC in the 1924 Five Nations Championship against England, Ireland, and France, won caps for Wales (RL) while at Halifax, Leeds, Castleford in the 19–23 defeat by England at Fartown Ground, Huddersfield on 18 March 1931, and Warrington 1928...1933 4-caps, and represented Glamorgan County RLFC while at Castleford in the 19–12 victory over Cumberland and at Recreation Ground, Whitehaven on 21 March 1931, and 12–33 defeat by Yorkshire at Thrum Hall, Halifax on 15 April 1931
- James "Jim" Featherstone won caps for England while at Warrington 1948 France, 1949 Wales, France (2 matches), Other Nationalities, 1950 Wales (2 matches), 1952 Wales, and won caps for Great Britain while at Warrington 1948 Australia, 1950 New Zealand (2 matches), 1952 Australia (3 matches)
- Jack Fish won caps for England while at Warrington 1904 Other Nationalities, 1906 Other Nationalities, 1908 Wales
- Idwal Fisher won a cap for Wales while at Warrington 1963 1-cap
- John "Jackie" Fleming won caps for England while at Warrington 1948 France (2 matches), Wales, 1949 Wales, France, while at Widnes 1951 France
- Philip "Phil" Ford won caps for Wales while at Warrington, Leeds, and Salford 1984 to 1995 1984(1991?)...1995 9(10?)-caps + 1-cap (sub) 4-tries 16-points
- Tommy Flynn won a cap for Wales while at Warrington 1931 1-cap
- Eric Fraser won caps for Great Britain while at Warrington 1958 Australia (3 matches), New Zealand (2 matches), 1959 France (2 matches), Australia, 1960 France (2 matches), New Zealand, France (2 matches), 1961 France, New Zealand (2 matches) (World Cup 1960 2-caps, 10-goals)
- Laurence "Laurie" Gilfedder won caps for Great Britain while at Warrington in 1962 against Australia, New Zealand (2 matches), and France, and in 1963 against France
- Mark Gleeson won caps for England while at Warrington 2005 France (sub)
- Parry Gordon won caps for England while at Warrington 1975 Papua New Guinea (sub)
- Francis Gregory won caps for England while at Warrington 1939 Wales
- Mike Gregory won caps for Great Britain while at Warrington 1987...90 20-caps
- Robert "Bobby" Greenhough won caps for Great Britain while at Warrington 1960 New Zealand (World Cup 1960 1-cap)
- Iestyn Harris won caps for Wales while at Warrington, Leeds Rhinos, and Bradford Bulls 1994...present 19-caps 8-tries 60-goals 142-points, and won caps for Great Britain while at Warrington, while at Leeds, while at Bradford 1996...2004 12-caps won caps for Wales (RU) while at Cardiff Blues (RU) 2001...04 ?-caps
- Gerry Helme won caps for England while at Warrington 1948 Wales, France, 1949 Wales, France, 1953 France, and won caps for Great Britain while at Warrington 1948 Australia (3 matches), 1954 Australia (3 matches), New Zealand (2 matches), 1954 France (2 matches), Australia, New Zealand (World Cup 1954 4-caps, 2-tries)
- Mark Hilton won caps for England while at Warrington 1995 France (sub), 1999 France (sub)
- Thomas "Tom" Hockenhull won caps for England while at Warrington 1906 Other Nationalities
- Keith Holden won a cap for Great Britain while at Warrington in 1963 against Australia
- E. John "Jack" Jenkins won caps for Wales while at Warrington in 1909 against England
- Albert Johnson won caps for England while at Warrington 1944 Wales, 1945 Wales (2 matches), 1946 France (2 matches), Wales (2 matches), 1947 France (2 matches), Wales, and won caps for Great Britain while at Warrington 1946 Australia (2 matches), New Zealand, 1947 New Zealand (3 matches)
- Mark Jones won caps for Wales (RU) while at Neath in 1987 against Scotland, and, in 1988 against New Zealand (sub), in 1989 against Scotland, and, Ireland, and, France, England, and New Zealand, in 1990 against France, England, Scotland, and, Ireland, and Namibia (2 matches), and while at Pontypool in 1998 against Zimbabwe, won caps for Wales (RL) while at Hull in 1991 against Papua New Guinea, in 1992 against France, England, and France, in 1993 against New Zealand, in 1994 against France, and while at Warrington in the 1995 Rugby League World Cup against France (sub), and England (sub), in 1996 against France, and England, and won a cap for Great Britain (RL) while at Hull in 1992 against France (sub)
- Kenneth "Ken" Kelly won caps for England while at Warrington 1979 Wales, 1981 France, Wales, and won caps for Great Britain while at St. Helens 1972 France (2 matches), while at Warrington 1980 New Zealand, 1982 Australia
- William "Billy" Kirk won caps for England while at Warrington 1930 Other Nationalities
- Roy Lambert won caps for Wales while at Neath, Dewsbury, and Warrington 1950...1952 7-caps
- Jason Lee won caps for Wales while at Warrington Wolves, Keighley Cougars, and Halifax 1994...2001 5-caps + 2-caps (sub) 2-tries 8-points
- Thomas "Tommy" Martyn won caps for England while at Warrington 1975 Wales, France, Wales (sub), 1979 Wales, France
- Tom McKinney for Other Nationalities 7-caps won caps for British Empire XIII while at Salford 1952 New Zealand won caps for Rugby League XIII while at Salford 1954 France, and won caps for Great Britain while at Salford 1951 New Zealand, 1952 France (non-test), Australia (2 matches), 1953 France (non-test), 1954 France (non-test), Australia (3 matches), New Zealand, while at Warrington 1955 New Zealand (2 matches), France (non-test), New Zealand, 1956 France (non-test), while at St. Helens 1957 New Zealand (World Cup 1957 1-cap)
- Jesse Meredith won a cap for Wales while at Warrington 1930 1-cap
- Joseph "Joe" "Jack" 'Cod' Miller won caps for England while at Warrington 1928 Wales, 1933 Other Nationalities, 1936 France, Wales, and won caps for Great Britain while at Warrington 1933 Australia (3 matches), 1936 Australia, New Zealand (2 matches)
- Adrian Morley won caps for England while at Leeds 1996 France (sub), 2000 Australia, Ireland, and won caps for Great Britain while at Leeds 1996 New Zealand (sub) (2 matches), 1997 ASL (2 matches), ASL (sub), 1999 Australia, New Zealand, 2002 Sydney New Zealand (2 matches), 2003 Australia (3 matches), 2004 Australia (3 matches), New Zealand (2 matches), 2005 Australia (2 matches), New Zealand, New Zealand (sub), 2006 New Zealand (3 matches), Australia (sub) (2 matches), while at Warrington 2007 France, New Zealand (3 matches)
- Alex Murphy (Warrington Testimonial match 1976) won caps for England while at Leigh 1969 Wales, France, and won caps for Great Britain while at St. Helens 1958 Australia (3 matches), New Zealand, 1959 France (2 matches), Australia, 1960 New Zealand, France, Australia, France, 1961 France, New Zealand (3 matches), 1962 France, Australia (3 matches), 1963 Australia (2 matches), 1964 France, 1965 France, New Zealand, 1966 France (2 matches), while at Warrington 1971 New Zealand (World Cup 1960 3-caps, 1-try)
- Albert Naughton won caps for England while at Warrington 1953 France (2 matches), 1956 France, and won caps for Great Britain while at Warrington 1954 France (2 matches) (World Cup 1954 2-caps)
- Michael "Mike" Nicholas won caps for Wales while at Warrington 1975...1979 4(6?)-caps + 2-caps (sub) (World Cup 1975 Squad 0-caps)
- Derek Noonan won caps for England while at Warrington 1975 Wales, France, Wales (World Cup 1975 Squad 2-caps)
- Terry O'Grady won caps for England while at Oldham 1952 Wales, 1955 Other Nationalities, and won caps for Great Britain while at Oldham 1954 Australia (2 matches), New Zealand (3 matches), while at Warrington 1961 New Zealand
- Billy O'Neill won caps for Wales while at Warrington in 1908 against England, and in 1909 against England
- Harold Palin won caps for England while at Warrington 1947 Wales, 1948 France, and won caps for Great Britain while at Warrington 1947 New Zealand (2 matches)
- Kenneth "Ken" Parr won caps for England while at Warrington 1968 Wales, and won caps for Great Britain while at Warrington 1968 France
- Alfred "Alf" Peacock won caps for England while at Warrington 1925 Wales
- Ossie Peake won caps for England while at Warrington 1939 Wales, 1940 Wales, 1941 Wales
- Barry Philbin won caps for England while at Warrington 1975 France
- Rowland Phillips won caps for Wales while at Warrington, and, Workington Town 1991...1996(1998?) 7(15, 14?)-caps + 10-caps (sub) 2-tries 8-points
- Albert Pimblett won caps for England while at Warrington 1948 Wales, 1949 France, and won caps for Great Britain while at Warrington 1948 Australia (3 matches)
- Ian Potter won caps for England while at Warrington 1981 France, Wales, and won caps for Great Britain while at Wigan 1985 New Zealand (3 matches), 1986 France (2 matches), Australia (2 matches), Australia (sub)
- Stanley "Stan" Powell won caps for Wales while at St. Helens against England at Central Park, Wigan during March 1945, and while at Warrington in 1947
- John "Jack" Preston won caps for England while at Warrington 1905 Other Nationalities
- Raymond "Ray" Price won caps for Great Britain while at Warrington 1954...57 9-caps (World Cup 1957 Squad 0-caps)
- Stephen "Steve" Ray won caps for Wales while at Wakefield Trinity, and Warrington 1930...1932 2-caps
- Jon Roper won caps for England while at Warrington 1999 France
- Robert "Bob" Ryan won caps for England while at Warrington 1950 France, 1952 Other Nationalities, and won caps for Great Britain while at Warrington 1950 Australia, New Zealand (2 matches), 1951 New Zealand, 1952 Australia
- Ronald "Ron" Ryder won caps for England while at Warrington 1952 Other Nationalities, and won caps for Great Britain while at Warrington 1952 Australia
- Paul Sculthorpe won caps for England while at Warrington 1996 France, Wales, while at St. Helens 2000 New Zealand, 2001 Wales, and won caps for Great Britain while at Warrington 1996 Papua New Guinea (sub), Fiji, New Zealand (3 matches), 1997 ASL (3 matches), while at St. Helens 1998 New Zealand (3 matches), 1999 Australia (sub), 2001 Australia (3 matches), 2002 Australia, New Zealand (2 matches), 2003 Australia (3 matches), 2004 Australia (3 matches), New Zealand, 2006 New Zealand
- Frank Shugars won five caps for Wales while at Warrington between 1909, and 1912, all of them against England, and won caps for Great Britain while at Warrington in 1910 against Australasia, and New Zealand
- Arthur Skelhorne won caps for England while at Warrington 1921 Australia, 1922 Wales, 1923 Wales, and won caps for Great Britain while at Warrington 1920 Australia, New Zealand (3 matches), 1921–22 Australia (3 matches)
- David Stephenson won caps for Great Britain while at Warrington in 1982 against Australia (2 matches), in 1986 against Australia, in 1987 against France, and Papua New Guinea, and in 1988 against France, Papua New Guinea, Australia (2 matches), and New Zealand.
- George Thomas won a cap for Wales while at Warrington in 1908 against New Zealand, and won a cap for Great Britain while at Warrington in 1908 against New Zealand
- Thomas "Tommy" 'Tubby' Thompson won caps for England while at Warrington 1933 Australia
- James "Jim" Tranter won caps for England while at Warrington 1922 Wales, 1923 Wales
- Robert "Bobby" Wanbon won a cap for Wales (RU) while at Aberavon in 1968 against England on 20 January 1968, scoring a try, and won caps for Wales (RL) while at Warrington in the 1975 Rugby League World Cup against England, Australia, and New Zealand (World Cup 1975 3-caps)
- Ben Westwood won caps for England while at Warrington 2004 Russia, France, Ireland, and, 2005 New Zealand
- Derek Whitehead won caps for Great Britain while at Warrington in 1971 against France (2 matches), and New Zealand
- Frank Williams won caps for England while at Warrington 1930 Other Nationalities
- Rhys Williams won a cap for Wales while at Warrington 2008 1-cap
- Charlie Winslade won caps for Wales while at Oldham, and Warrington 1952...1963 6-caps, and won a cap for Great Britain while at Oldham in 1959 against France
- Paul Wood won caps for England while at Warrington 2005 France, New Zealand
- John Woods won caps for England while at Leigh 1979 Wales (sub), France, 1980 Wales (sub), France, 1981 France (sub), Wales, Wales (sub), and won caps for Great Britain while at Leigh 1979 Australia (3 matches), New Zealand (sub), 1980 New Zealand, 1981 France (2 matches), 1982 Australia, Australia (sub), 1983 France (sub), while at Warrington 1987 Papua New Guinea (sub)
