= Chris Brockbank =

English RL coach and former England international rugby league footballer

Personal information
- Full name: Christopher Brockbank
- Born: c. 1901 Barton-upon-Irwell district, England
- Died: 24 July 1963 (aged 61) Blackpool, England

Playing information
- Position: Wing
Club
Years	Team	Pld	T	G	FG	P
1919–31	Swinton	273	137	28		467
1932	Bradford Northern
	Total	273	137	28	0	467
Representative
Years	Team	Pld	T	G	FG	P
1927	Lancashire	2	0	0	0	0
1927	England	1	0	0	0	0

Coaching information
Club
Years	Team	Gms	W	D	L	W%
≤1933–35	Huddersfield
1936–51	Warrington	216	160	4	61	74
	Total	216	160	4	61	74

Christopher Brockbank (c. 1901 – 24 July 1963) was an English professional rugby league footballer who played in the 1920s, and coached in the 1930s through to the 1950s. He played at representative level for England, and at club level for Swinton and Bradford Northern, as a wing, and coached at club level for Huddersfield and Warrington.

== Background ==
Chris Brockbank's birth was registered in Barton-upon-Irwell district, Lancashire, England, and he died aged 61 in Blackpool, Lancashire, England.

== Playing career ==
=== Club career ===
Chris Brockbank played on the wing in Swinton's 0–17 defeat by St Helens Recs in the 1923–24 Lancashire Cup Final during the 1923–24 season at Central Park, Wigan on Saturday 24 November 1923, in front of a crowd of 25,636, played on the wing and scored a try in the 15–11 victory over Wigan in the 1925–26 Lancashire Cup Final during the 1925–26 season at The Cliff, Broughton, Salford on Wednesday 9 December 1925 (postponed from Saturday 21 November 1925 due to fog), in front of a crowd of 17,000, played on the wing in the 5–2 victory over Wigan in the 1927–28 Lancashire Cup Final during the 1927–28 season at Watersheddings, Oldham on Saturday 19 November 1927, in front of a crowd of 22,000, but he didn't play in the 8–10 defeat by Salford in the 1931–32 Lancashire Cup Final during the 1931–32 season at The Cliff, Broughton, Salford on Saturday 21 November 1931, in front of a crowd of 26,471.

He was signed by Bradford Northern in January 1932.

=== International honours ===
Chris Brockbank won a cap for England while at Swinton in 1927 against Wales.

== Coaching career ==
=== Challenge Cup Final appearances ===
Chris Brockbank was the coach in Huddersfield's 21–17 victory over Warrington in the 1932–33 Challenge Cup Final during the 1932–33 season at Wembley Stadium, London on Saturday 6 May 1933, was the coach in the 8-11 defeat by Castleford in the 1934–35 Challenge Cup Final during the 1934–35 season at Wembley Stadium, London on Saturday 4 May 1935, in front of a crowd of 39,000, and was the coach in Warrington's 19-0 victory over Widnes in the 1949–50 Challenge Cup Final during the 1949–50 season at Wembley Stadium, London on Saturday 6 May 1950, in front of a crowd of 94,249.

== Genealogical information ==
Brockbank's marriage to Florence (née Jackson) was registered during third ¼ 1925 in Barton-upon-Irwell district.

== Outside of rugby league ==
Chris Brockbank retired from rugby league in 1951 to run a hotel business in Blackpool.
