= 1931–32 Lancashire Cup =

- Structure: Regional knockout championship
- Teams: 13
- Winners: Salford
- Runners-up: Swinton

The 1931–32 Lancashire Cup was the twenty-fourth occasion on which the Lancashire Cup competition had been held. Once again a new name was to be added to the trophy this year as it was the turn of Salford, who won the trophy for the first time by beating neighbours and close rivals Swinton in the final by 10–8.

== Background ==
At the time of the great schism in 1895, Salford had initially remained loyal to the Rugby Football Union but in April 1896 the board met and only three members opposed the motion to switch to the new code. The change of heart was partly brought about by the sudden lack of "interesting" or derby fixtures for the club.

== Competition and results ==
The number of teams entering this year's competition remained at 13 but from this season the fixture format was changed. There was only one bye in the first round but now also a "blank" or "dummy" fixture. This also resulted in one bye in the second round.

=== Round 1 ===
Involved 6 matches (with one bye and one "blank" fixture) and 13 clubs

Game No	Fixture date	Home team	Score	Away team	Venue	Att	Rec	Notes	Ref
1	Sat 10 Oct 1931	Broughton Rangers	8–13	Wigan	The Cliff				
2	Sat 10 Oct 1931	Oldham	13–13	Barrow	Watersheddings				
3	Sat 10 Oct 1931	Wigan Highfield	7–7	Leigh	Tunstall Lane				
4	Sat 10 Oct 1931	Salford	16–5	St. Helens	The Willows				
5	Sat 10 Oct 1931	Warrington	11–2	St Helens Recs	Wilderspool				
6	Sat 10 Oct 1931	Widnes	10–3	Rochdale Hornets	Lowerhouse Lane				
7		Swinton		bye					
8		blank		blank					

=== Round 1 – replays ===
Involved 2 matches

Game No	Fixture date	Home team	Score	Away team	Venue	Att	Rec	Notes	Ref
1	Wed 14 Oct 1931	Leigh	11–7	Wigan Highfield	Mather Lane				
2	Thu 15 Oct 1931	Barrow	27–9	Oldham	Craven Park			1	

=== Round 2 – quarterfinals ===
Involved 3 matches (with one bye) and 7 clubs

Game No	Fixture date	Home team	Score	Away team	Venue	Att	Rec	Notes	Ref
1	Wed 21 Oct 1931	Leigh	7–37	Swinton	Mather Lane				
2	Wed 21 Oct 1931	Warrington	7–17	Salford	Wilderspool				
3	Thu 22 Oct 1931	Widnes	7–6	Wigan	Lowerhouse Lane				
4		Barrow		bye					

=== Round 3 – semifinals ===
Involved 2 matches and 4 clubs

Game No	Fixture date	Home team	Score	Away team	Venue	Att	Rec	Notes	Ref
1	Wed 04 Nov 1931	Swinton	37–0	Widnes	Station Road	7,000			
2	Wed 11 Nov 1931	Salford	21–0	Barrow	The Willows				-

=== Final ===
The final was played at the Cliff, Broughton, Salford, (historically in the county of Lancashire) and on the banks of the River Irwell. The attendance was 26,471 and receipts £1,030. The attendance was a new record beating the 25,656 of 1924.

Game No	Fixture date	Home team	Score	Away team	Venue	Att	Rec	Notes	Ref
	Saturday 21 November 1931	Salford	10–8	Swinton	The Cliff	26,471	£1,654	2 3	

==== Teams and scorers ====
Salford	№	Swinton
	teams	
Gus Risman	1	Bob Scott
Fergie Southward	2	Frank Buckingham
Emlyn Jenkins	3	George Whittaker
Sammy Miller	4	Johnny Jones
Barney Hudson	5	Jack Kenny
Reg Meek	6	Hughie Salmon
Billy Watkins	7	Bryn Evans (c)
Billy Williams	8	Miller Strong
Fred Shaw	9	Tommy Armitt
Joe Bradbury	10	Joe Wright
Alf Middleton	11	Martin Hodgson
Teddy Haines	12	Fred Beswick
Jack Feetham	13	Fred Butters
10	score	8
3	HT	3
	Scorers	
	Tries	
Emlyn Jenkins (2)	T	Johnny Jones (1)
	T	Hughie Salmon (1)
	Goals	
Fergie Southward (2)	G	Martin Hodgson (1)
	G	
	Drop Goals	
	DG	
Referee		Frank Peel (Bradford)

Scoring – Try = three (3) points – Goal = two (2) points – Drop goal = two (2) points

=== The road to success ===
First round
Warrington	11
St Helens Recs	2
Salford	16
St. Helens	5
Oldham	13–9
Barrow	13–27
blank
blank
Wigan Highfield	7–7
Leigh	7–11
Swinton
bye
Widnes	10
Rochdale Hornets	3
Broughton Rangers	8
Wigan	13

Second round
Warrington	7
Salford	17
Barrow
bye
Leigh	7
Swinton	37
Widnes	7
Wigan	6

Semifinals
Salford	21
Barrow	0
Swinton	37
Widnes	0

Final
Salford	10
Swinton	8

== Notes ==
1. The first Lancashire Cup match played at the new ground
2. The attendance of 26,471 was a new record for a Lancashire Cup final attendance
3. The Cliff was the home ground of Broughton Rangers from 1913 and until they moved out to Belle Vue in 1933. In 1938 Manchester United moved in and used it as both a match ground for academy teams etc. and a general a training ground. They purchased the ground outright in 1951 and downgraded it to Junior team use in the early 2000s

== See also ==
- 1931–32 Northern Rugby Football League season
- Rugby league county cups
- List of defunct rugby league clubs
