= 1935 Match of Champions =

| | 1 | 2 | Total |
|---|---|---|---|
| VIL | 9 | 16 | 25 |
| SWI | 11 | 16 | 27 |
- Date: 19 May 1935
- Stadium: Parc de Suzon
- Location: Talence, Gironde, France
- Referee: Albert Dupouy
- Attendance: 15,000

Broadcast partners
- Broadcasters: n/a

The 1935 Match of Champions was a single-game rugby league football contest pitting Rugby Football League champions Swinton RLFC against French champions SA Villeneuvois of Villeneuve-sur-Lot. It took place in the Bordeaux suburb of Talence on 19 May 1935, shortly after their respective domestic wins.

== Background ==
The Rugby Football League of England played an active role in the introduction of its code to France, and was eager to support its fledgling equivalent, the Ligue de Rugby à XIII, by agreeing to many Anglo-French fixtures, which served as both teaching tools and promotional vehicles for the game thanks to the longstanding rivalry between the two countries. A grand final between the national champions of both countries was considered as soon as both organizations started working together on the 1934–35 schedule in May 1934. The date of the game was announced as part of the season's provisional schedule in late August 1934. A game between French Cup winners US Lyon-Villeurbanne and Challenge Cup winners Castleford RLFC was also organized on 12 May in the Paris suburb of Montrouge. Before both were assigned to French cities, each contest was planned to alternate between a French and a British host.

Swinton RLFC, which had already expressed their intent to participate prior to their domestic championship game, finalized playing arrangements on May 14, and left Manchester for France on May 17. Their contract stipulated that they would receive no share of the games' proceeds, other than the reimbursement of their expenses. The touring party consisted of three executives, a secretary, a trainer and 16 players, including three alternates named as Th. Holland (scrum-half), S. Woodall (second row) and John Stoddart (front row). Villeneuve presented its best possible lineup for the game. As they were already assured of the French title (which was then decided by a regular season only), Villeneuve stars Max Rousié and Jean Galia opted to sit out their final championship game the previous week against Bordeaux, which resulted in a loss. It was particularly crucial to Rousié, who was still limited by the same knee injury that had caused him kept him to miss Team France's Jubilee Game against Great Britain.

Following the French representatives' encouraging showings in the Jubilee Match and the Cup Winners' Match, a win was considered a real possibility by the press, although it was noted that Villeneuve had looked fatigued in the final stretch of the domestic season. In the UK, the Manchester Evening Chronicle thought that Swinton had a good chance of prevailing, but noted that their workmanlike style had left many observers unimpressed. Tickets were priced between 8 and 15 francs according to one source, and between 5 and 13.25 francs according to another. The event proved a massive success at the gate, and Parc de Suzon was too small to satisfy public demand.

== Game summary ==
The game was a prolific affair. The scoring started almost immediately with a 50-metre penalty kick by Rousié, but the pace picked up even further in the second, with both teams scoring four tries each. While the contest was close and ultimately decided by a single penalty kick in the first, the scoreline was somewhat flattering for the French, who were outplayed most of the time, especially in scrums. Hodgson's second-period try, an almost coast-to-coast effort that started behind the Brittons' 22-metre line, and only took seven or eight passes to move the ball all the way up the field, was revelatory of the true difference in class between the two teams, and some were underwhelmed by Villeneuve's performance. Hodgson shone for the Brittons, while Daffis was deemed to have been Villeneuve's best player. French teammate and star Jean Galia was injured during the game.

=== Incident ===
Just like in the Cup Winners' Match held in Paris one week prior, the French representative's narrow defeat, possibly exacerbated by a misunderstanding of the new code's offside rules, inflamed the public's frustration. The referee was blamed for awarding a disputed try to Swinton, and denying one to Villeneuve. Although, unlike in the Paris, lead official Albert Dupouy was French and a former union international, this did not do anything to pacify the crowd, who invaded the field at the end of the game, and attempted to assault him. He had to be escorted back to his locker room under the protection of the police.

== Match details ==
19 May 1935
15:30

| SA Villeneuvois | 25–27 | Swinton RLFC |
|---|---|---|
| Tries: Cougnenc, Puyuelo (2), Daffis, Camo; Goals: Rousié [2 uncredited conversions in 2nd half] Penalty: Rousié (2) | | Tries: Buckingham (2), Hodgson, Shaw, Wright; Goals: Hodgson [2 uncredited conversions in 2nd half] Penalty: Hodgson (3) |

Parc de Suzon
Attendance: 15,000
Referee: Albert Dupouy

=== SA Villeneuvois ===
Fullback: Marius Guiral
Threequarters: Ernest Camo, Étienne Cougnenc, Max Rousié, ? Dazenières
Halfbacks: Georges Lhespitaou (fly-half), Pierre Brinsolles (scrum-half)
Forwards: Maurice Laffargue (lock), Jean Galia, Antoine Puyuelo (second row), Jean Daffis, Maurice Porra, Jean Barrès (front row)

=== Swinton RLFC ===
Fullback: Bob Scott
Threequarters: Frank Buckingham, Arthur Hickman, Harold Evens, W. Shaw
Halfbacks: R. Green (fly-half), Bryn Evans (scrum half)
Forwards: James Sullivan (lock), Fred Butters, Martin Hodgson (second row), Gomer Hughes, Tom Armitt, Joe Wright (front row)

== Swinton tour of France ==
Contrary to Castleford's visit, which consisted of a standalone fixture, Swinton's visit was turned into a four-game tour. Following the unification game, they followed with three exhibition fixtures. The Mancunians' trip was planned to run concurrently with a second French tour by Leeds RLFC. However, Leeds cancelled their appearance (they would reschedule one at the start of the following season), and the two tours were condensed into one. Despite Swinton not receiving payment for their participation, host club Pau XIII found the fee charged by the French Rugby League to book the English tourists quite taxing on their finances. The match against the South France selects was originally scheduled to take place in Toulouse, before the hosting rights were picked up by a cycling club in Cognac, whose federation was typically much more accommodating to the new code than those representing rugby union and association football.

| Date | Opponent | Venue | Score |
|---|---|---|---|
| 24 May | Pau XIII | Stade Bourbaki, Pau, Basses-Pyrénées | 19–8 |
| 26 May | South West France selects | Vélodrome Petit-Breton, Nantes, Loire-Atlantique | 14–6 |
| 30 May | South France selects | Vélodrome, Cognac, Charente | 29–22 |

== Cancelled 1936 Match ==
The contest was originally supposed to be an annual event, featuring the current champions of France and England. Contrary to the inaugural match, whose scheduling was agreed upon early on, the date of the 1936 edition was apparently not chosen until late into the season, when a 10 May date was announced. However, the contest could not take place on that day, due to the postponement of the NRFL Championship's elimination rounds, which caused the final to be moved from 2 May to 9 May. The 10 May date was filled by a contest between the winner of the French Cup (Côte Basque) and the winner of the French championship (XIII Catalan), which was played in Perpignan and won by the former by a score of 16–15.

To accommodate the English delay, XIII Catalan adjusted their schedule, extending a new offer to the last two teams in the running for the RFL title, Widnes RLFC and Hull FC, for 17 May. Contemporary British press indicates that Widnes accepted the challenge two days prior to the final, win or lose. The financial conditions offered by the French were described as less than enticing, but the allure of a journey to France convinced the Widnes players to commit anyway. Widnes also entered talks with Côte Basque and Bordeaux to play exhibitions on their grounds and extend the trip into a one-week tour. Following their loss in the championship final, the unification game against XIII Catalan was dropped from the program, and Widnes' tour of France proceeded purely as an exhibition affair.
