= Jack Evans (English rugby league, born 1897) =

Great Britain and England international rugby league footballer

Personal information
- Full name: John Evans
- Born: 23 September 1897 Llwynypia, Glamorgan, Wales
- Died: 20 March 1940 (aged 42) Pendlebury, Lancashire, England

Playing information
- Position: Centre
Club
Years	Team	Pld	T	G	FG	P
1921–≥28	Swinton
1934	Broughton Rangers	1	0	0	0	0
	Total	1	0	0	0	0
Representative
Years	Team	Pld	T	G	FG	P
1922–27	Lancashire	11	4	0	0	12
1925–28	England	5	1	0	0	3
1926–27	Great Britain	3	2	0	0	6

Coaching information
Club
Years	Team	Gms	W	D	L	W%
1933	Broughton Rangers	0	0	0	0
- Father: Jack Evans
- Relatives: Bryn Evans (brother)

John Evans (23 September 1897 – 20 March 1940) was a Welsh professional rugby league footballer who played in the 1920s. He played at representative level for Great Britain and England, and at club level for Swinton, as a centre.

== Playing career ==
=== Swinton ===
Evans debuted for Swinton in 1921. He played centre in Swinton's 0–17 defeat by St Helens Recs in the 1923 Lancashire Cup Final during the 1923–24 season at Central Park, Wigan on Saturday 24 November 1923, played left-centre, and scored a try in the 15–11 victory over Wigan in the 1925 Lancashire Cup Final during the 1925–26 season at The Cliff, Broughton, Salford on Wednesday 9 December 1925 (postponed from Saturday 21 November 1925 due to fog), and played left-centre in the 5–2 victory over Wigan in the 1927 Lancashire Cup Final during the 1927–28 season at Watersheddings, Oldham on Saturday 19 November 1927.

=== International honours ===
Evans won caps for England while at Swinton in 1925 against Wales (2 matches), in 1926 against Wales, and Other Nationalities, in 1928 against Wales, and won caps for Great Britain while at Swinton in 1926–27 against New Zealand (3 matches).

== Coaching career ==
Evans was appointed as manager of Broughton Rangers ahead of the 1933–34 season. In February 1934, he made an appearance for the Rangers as a player against Castleford, but suffered a collarbone injury early in the game and took no further part.

== Personal life ==
Jack Evans was the older brother of the rugby league footballer, Bryn Evans. His father, John, also known as Jack, also played rugby for Swinton, winning the Challenge Cup in 1900.

== Outside of rugby league ==
Jack Evans was the landlord of the Royal Oak, 536 Bolton Road, Pendlebury, from 1932 onwards and probably until his untimely death in 1940. In later years, the pub was run by his son Stan, who was also assisted by Jack's brother Bryn, Stan's uncle.
