= 1923–24 Lancashire Cup =

- Structure: Regional knockout competition
- Teams: 13
- Winners: St Helens Recs
- Runners-up: Swinton

The 1923–24 Lancashire Cup competition was the sixteenth competition in the regional Lancashire Cup tournament. The trophy was won by St Helens Recs who beat Swinton in the final at Central Park, Wigan, by a score of 17–0. The attendance was a new record for the competition final at the time, being 25,656 and receipts £1,450. The triumph by St Helens Recs was the first time the club had won the competition and also the first time that winning club were not one of the original clubs who formed the Northern Union.

== Background ==
The number of teams entering this year's competition remained at 13, with again no junior/amateur team being admitted. This resulted in 3 byes in the first round.

The quarter-final match between Warrington and Widnes took three matches to finally decide, the second replay being held at Central Park.

== Competition and results ==
=== Round 1 ===
Involved 5 matches (with three byes) and 13 clubs

Game No	Fixture date	Home team	Score	Away team	Venue	Att	Rec	Notes	Ref
1	Sat 13 October 1923	Rochdale Hornets	7–3	Wigan Highfield	Athletic Grounds				
2	Sat 13 October 1923	St. Helens	5–0	Salford	Knowsley Road				
3	Sat 13 October 1923	Warrington	15–2	Barrow	Wilderspool				
4	Sat 13 October 1923	Widnes	5–3	Leigh	Lowerhouse Lane				
5	Sat 13 October 1923	Wigan	11–6	Broughton Rangers	Central Park				
6		Oldham		bye					
7		St Helens Recs		bye					
8		Swinton		bye					

=== Round 2 – quarterfinals ===
Game No	Fixture date	Home team	Score	Away team	Venue	Att	Rec	Notes	Ref
1	Sat 27 October 1923	Oldham	15–5	Wigan	Watersheddings				
2	Sat 27 October 1923	St Helens Recs	21–0	Rochdale Hornets	City Road				
3	Sat 27 October 1923	St. Helens	5–5	Swinton	Knowsley Road				
4	Sat 27 October 1923	Warrington	6–6	Widnes	Wilderspool				
1st Replays
5	Wed 31 October 1923	Swinton	21–8	St. Helens	Chorley Road ground				
6	Thu 1 November 1923	Widnes	5–5	Warrington	Lowerhouse Lane				
2nd Replay
7	Mon 5 November 1923	Warrington	13–2	Widnes	Central Park				

=== Round 3 – semifinals ===
Game No	Fixture date	Home team	Score	Away team	Venue	Att	Rec	Notes	Ref
1	Sat 10 November 1923	St Helens Recs	13–11	Oldham	City Road				
2	Sat 10 November 1923	Swinton	19–7	Warrington	Chorley Road ground	14,000			

=== Final ===
Game No	Fixture date	Home team	Score	Away team	Venue	Att	Rec	Notes	Ref
	Saturday 24 November 1923	St Helens Recs	17–0	Swinton	Central Park	25,656	£1,450	1	

==== Teams and scorers ====
St Helens Recs	№	Swinton
	teams	
Tommy Dingsdale	1	Frank Pearson
J. Gormley	2	Frank Evans
Jim Owen	3	Hector Halsall (c)
J. Pyke	4	Jack Evans
Joe Mc Comas	5	Chris Brockbank
Fred Halton	6	Albert Jenkins
Johnny Greenall (c)	7	Bryn Evans
R. Ramsdale	8	Miller Strong
J. Hughes	9	Henry Blewer
Harry Grundy	10	Harold Worsley
Tommy Smith	11	Harry Powell
Albert Fildes	12	Tom McCormick
Billy Mulvanney	13	Stan Howarth
J. Bate (reserve to travel)	14	
F. Leyland (reserve to travel)	15	
17	score	0
4	HT	0
	Scorers	
	Tries	
Owen, Pyke, Greenall	T	
	T	
	T	
	T	
	Goals	
Pyke (2), Dingsdale (1)	G	
	G	
	Drop Goals	
	DG	
Referee		

Scoring – Try = three (3) points – Goal = two (2) points – Drop goal = two (2) points

=== The road to success ===
First round
St Helens Recs
bye
Rochdale Hornets	7
Wigan Highfield	3
Oldham
bye
Wigan	11
Broughton Rangers	6
St. Helens	5
Salford	0
Swinton
bye
Warrington	15
Barrow	2
Widnes	5
Leigh	3

Second round
St Helens Recs	21
Rochdale Hornets	0
Oldham	15
Wigan	5
St. Helens	5(8)
Swinton	5(21)
Warrington	6(5)(13)
Widnes	6(5)(2)

Semifinals
St Helens Recs	13
Oldham	11
Swinton	19
Warrington	7

Final
St Helens Recs	17
Swinton	0

== See also ==
- 1923–24 Northern Rugby Football League season

== Notes ==
- 1 Central Park was the home ground of Wigan
