= Hector Halsall =

Great Britain international rugby league footballer and coach

Personal information
- Born: 20 August 1900; Wigan, England
- Died: October 1966 (aged 65–66); Wigan, England

Playing information
- Position: Centre
Club
Years	Team	Pld	T	G	FG	P
1920–30	Swinton	369	55	17
Representative
Years	Team	Pld	T	G	FG	P
1927–29	Lancashire	2	0	0	0	0
1930	Great Britain	1	0	0	0	0

Coaching information
Club
Years	Team	Gms	W	D	L	W%
1932–50	Barrow

Hector Halsall (20 August 1900 – October 1966) was an English professional rugby league footballer who played in the 1920s and 1930s, and coached in the 1930 and 1940s. He played at representative level for Great Britain, and at club level for Swinton (captain), as a centre, and coached at club level for Barrow.

== Background ==
Halsall was born in Wigan, Lancashire, England.

== Playing career ==
=== Swinton ===
Halsall made his début for Swinton on 6 November 1920.

Halsall played right-centre and was captain in Swinton's 0–17 defeat by St Helens Recs in the 1923 Lancashire Cup Final during the 1923–24 season at Central Park, Wigan on 24 November 1923. He then played right-centre and was captain in the 15–11 victory over Wigan in the 1925 Lancashire Cup Final during the 1925–26 season at The Cliff, Broughton, Salford on 9 December 1925 (postponed from Saturday 21 November 1925 due to fog). He also played right-centre and was captain in the 5–2 victory over Wigan in the 1927 Lancashire Cup Final during the 1927–28 season at Watersheddings, Oldham on 19 November 1927.

Halsall was captain of Swinton's 1927–28 Northern Rugby Football League season All Four Cups team.

=== International honours ===
Halsall won a cap for Great Britain while at Swinton in 1930 against Australia.

== Post-playing ==
After retiring from playing, he worked as a trainer at Barrow for 18 years, leaving the club in 1950. He died aged 66 in Wigan Infirmary, Wigan.
