= William Rees (rugby) =

Great Britain and Wales international rugby league footballer

Billo Rees
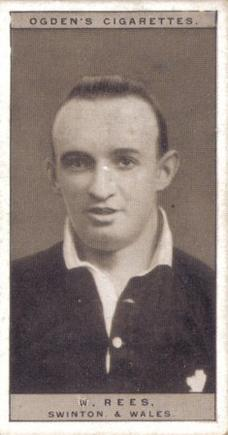
- Ogden's Cigarette card featuring William Rees

Personal information
- Full name: William Rees
- Born: 14 April 1899 Glanamman, Carmarthenshire, Wales
- Died: January 1968 (aged 68)

Playing information

Rugby union
Club
Years	Team	Pld	T	G	FG	P
≤1926–≤26	Amman United RFC

Rugby league
- Position: Stand-off, Scrum-half
Club
Years	Team	Pld	T	G	FG	P
1921–33	Swinton
Representative
Years	Team	Pld	T	G	FG	P
1926–30	Wales	6	0	0	0	0
1926–30	Great Britain	11	2	0	0	6
- Relatives: Joe Rees (brother)

William "Billo" Rees (14 April 1899 – 1968) was a Welsh rugby union, and professional rugby league footballer who played in the 1920s and 1930s. He played club level rugby union (RU) for Amman United RFC, and representative level rugby league (RL) for Great Britain and Wales, and at club level for Swinton, as a stand-off, or scrum-half or 7.

== Background ==
Billo Rees was born in Glanamman, Carmarthenshire, and he died aged 68.

== Playing career ==
=== International honours ===
Billo Rees won 6 caps for Wales (RL) in 1926–1930 while at Swinton, and won caps for Great Britain (RL) while at Swinton in 1926 against New Zealand, in 1927 against New Zealand, in 1928 against Australia (3 matches), New Zealand (3 matches), in 1929 against Australia (2 matches), in 1930 against Australia.

=== County Cup Final appearances ===
Billo Rees played stand-off in Swinton's 15–11 victory over Wigan in the 1925 Lancashire Cup Final during the 1925–26 season at The Cliff, Broughton, Salford on Wednesday 9 December 1925 (postponed from Saturday 21 November 1925 due to fog), played stand-off in the 5–2 victory over Wigan in the 1927 Lancashire Cup Final during the 1927–28 season at Watersheddings, Oldham on Saturday 19 November 1927.

== Genealogical information ==
Rees was the younger brother of the rugby union footballer; Joe Rees.
