= John Greenall =

Great Britain and England international rugby league footballer

Personal information
- Full name: John Greenall
- Born: c. 1893
- Died: 25 June 1943 (aged 50); St Helens, England

Playing information
- Position: Stand-off, Scrum-half
Club
| Years | Team | Pld | T | G | FG | P |
|---|---|---|---|---|---|---|
| 1919–28 | St. Helens Recs | 251 | 64 | 10 | 0 | 212 |
Representative
| Years | Team | Pld | T | G | FG | P |
| 1920–26 | Lancashire | 8 | 0 | 0 | 0 | 0 |
| 1923 | England | 2 | 0 | 0 | 0 | 0 |
| 1922 | Great Britain | 1 | 0 | 0 | 0 | 0 |

John "Johnny" Greenall (c. 1893 – 25 June 1943) was an English professional rugby league footballer who played in the 1910s and 1920s. He played at representative level for Great Britain and England, and at club level for St. Helens Recs (captain), as a stand-off, or scrum-half.

== Playing career ==
=== International honours ===
Johnny Greenall won caps for England while at St. Helens Recs in 1923 against Wales (2 matches), and won a cap for Great Britain while at St. Helens Recs in 1922 against Australia.

=== County Cup Final appearances ===
Johnny Greenall played in St. Helens Recs' victory in the Lancashire County league during the 1926–27 season.

=== County Cup Final appearances ===
Johnny Greenall played scrum-half, and was captain in St. Helens Recs' 17-0 victory over Swinton in the 1923 Lancashire Cup Final during the 1923–24 season at Central Park, Wigan on Saturday 24 November 1923.

=== Club career ===
Johnny Greenall made his début for St. Helens Recs against Swinton on Saturday 23 August 1919, and he played his last match for St. Helens Recs against Barrow at Little Park Roose, Barrow-in-Furness on Saturday 29 September 1928.

He appears to have scored no drop-goals (or field-goals as they are currently known in Australasia), but prior to the 1974–75 season all goals, whether conversions, penalties, or drop-goals, scored 2-points. Consequently, prior to this date, drop-goals were often not explicitly documented; therefore '0' drop-goals may indicate drop-goals not recorded, rather than no drop-goals scored. In addition, prior to the 1949–50 season, the archaic field-goal was also still a valid means of scoring points.
