= 1927–28 Lancashire Cup =

- Structure: Regional knockout competition
- Teams: 13
- Champions: Swinton
- Runners-up: Wigan

The 1927–28 Lancashire Cup competition was the 20th competition in the history of this regional rugby league event and the final was a repeat of the 1925–26 Lancashire Cup Final, with Swinton beating Wigan by 5–2. The match was played at Watersheddings, Oldham. The attendance was 22,000 and receipts £1,275.

== Background ==
The number of teams entering this year's competition dropped back to 13 due to no amateur participation. This resulted in the competition running with 3 byes in the first round.

== Competition and results ==
=== Round 1 ===
Involved 5 matches (with three byes) and 13 clubs

Game No	Fixture date	Home team	Score	Away team	Venue	Att	Rec	Notes	Ref
1	Sat 8 October 1927	Oldham	20–9	Wigan Highfield	Watersheddings				
2	Sat 8 October 1927	St Helens Recs	41–5	Broughton Rangers	City Road				
3	Sat 8 October 1927	St. Helens	7–13	Swinton	Knowsley Road	15,000			
4	Sat 8 October 1927	Widnes	10–8	Rochdale Hornets	Lowerhouse Lane				
5	Sat 8 October 1927	Wigan	21–8	Leigh	Central Park				
6		Salford		bye					
7		Barrow		bye					
8		Warrington		bye					

=== Round 2 – quarterfinals ===
Game No	Fixture date	Home team	Score	Away team	Venue	Att	Rec	Notes	Ref
1	Mon 17 October 1927	Salford	0–0	Barrow	The Willows				
2	Mon 17 October 1927	Warrington	16–2	Widnes	Wilderspool				
3	Wed 19 October 1927	St Helens Recs	7–10	Wigan	City Road				
4	Wed 19 October 1927	Swinton	18–9	Oldham	Chorley Road ground	8,000			
Replay
5	Thu 20 October 1927	Barrow	2–5	Salford	Little Park, Roose				

=== Round 3 – semifinals ===
Game No	Fixture date	Home team	Score	Away team	Venue	Att	Rec	Notes	Ref
1	Wed 2 November 1927	Swinton	10–3	Salford	Chorley Road ground	7,000			
2	Wed 2 November 1927	Wigan	12–5	Warrington	Central Park				

=== Final ===
Game No	Fixture date	Home team	Score	Away team	Venue	Att	Rec	Notes	Ref
	Saturday 19 November 1927	Swinton	5–2	Wigan	Watersheddings	22,000	£1,275	1	

==== Teams and scorers ====
Swinton	№	Wigan
	teams	
Jack Pearson	1	Jim Sullivan
Frank Evans	2	
Hector Halsall (c)	3	
Jack Evans	4	
Chris Brockbank	5	
Billo Rees	6	
Bryn Evans	7	
Miller Strong	8	
Henry Blewer	9	
Bert Morris	10	
Martin Hodgson	11	
Dick Cracknell	12	
Fred Beswick	13	
5	score	2
5	HT	0
	Scorers	
	Tries	
Fred Beswick (1)	T	
	Goals	
Bert Morris (1)	G	Jim Sullivan (1)
	Drop Goals	
	DG	
Referee		

Scoring – Try = three (3) points – Goal = two (2) points – Drop goal = two (2) points

=== The road to success ===
First round
St. Helens	7
Swinton	13
Oldham	20
Wigan Highfield	9
Salford
bye
Barrow
bye
St Helens Recs	41
Broughton Rangers	5
Wigan	21
Leigh	8
Warrington
bye
Widnes	10
Rochdale Hornets	8

Second round
Swinton	18
Oldham	9
Salford	0(5)
Barrow	0(2)
St Helens Recs	7
Wigan	10
Warrington	16
Widnes	2

Semifinals
Swinton	10
Salford	3
Wigan	12
Warrington	5

Final
Swinton	5
Wigan	2

== See also ==
- 1927–28 Northern Rugby Football League season

== Notes ==
- 1 Watersheddings was the home ground of Oldham from 1889 to 1997. The ground, at one time, also housed a greyhound track.
