= Bryn Evans (rugby league) =

Great Britain and England international rugby league footballer

- Godfrey Phillips's Cigarette card featuring Bryn Evans

Personal information
- Full name: Bryn Evans
- Born: 25 November 1899 Swinton, Lancashire, England
- Died: 10 July 1975 (aged 75)

Playing information
- Position: Stand-off, Scrum-half
Club
Years	Team	Pld	T	G	FG	P
1920–36	Swinton	464	98	0	0	294
Representative
Years	Team	Pld	T	G	FG	P
1923–32	Lancashire	21	1	0	0	3
1930–32	England	3	0	0	0	0
1927–33	Great Britain	11	1	0	0	3
- Father: Jack Evans
- Relatives: Jack Evans (brother)

Bryn Evans (25 November 1899 – 10 July 1975) was an English professional rugby league footballer who played in the 1920s and 1930s. He played at representative level for Great Britain, England and Lancashire, and at club level for Swinton, as a stand-off, or scrum-half.

== Playing career ==
=== Swinton ===
Evans made his debut for Swinton in 1920. He played scrum-half in Swinton's 0–17 defeat by St Helens Recs in the 1923 Lancashire Cup Final during the 1923–24 season at Central Park, Wigan on Saturday 24 November 1923, played scrum-half, and scored a try in the 15–11 victory over Wigan in the 1925 Lancashire Cup Final during the 1925–26 season at The Cliff, Broughton, Salford on Wednesday 9 December 1925 (postponed from Saturday 21 November 1925 due to fog), played scrum-half in the 5–2 victory over Wigan in the 1927 Lancashire Cup Final during the 1927–28 season at Watersheddings, Oldham on Saturday 19 November 1927, and played scrum-half, and was captain in the 8-10 defeat by Salford in the 1931 Lancashire Cup Final during the 1931–32 season at Watersheddings, Oldham on Saturday 21 November 1931.

=== International honours ===
Evans won caps for England while at Swinton in 1930 against Other Nationalities, in 1932 against Wales (2 matches), 1933 against Australia, and won caps for Great Britain while at Swinton in 1927 against New Zealand, in 1928 against New Zealand, in 1929-30 against Australia, in 1932 against Australia (2 matches), and New Zealand (3 matches), and in 1933 against Australia (2 matches).

== Personal life ==
Evans was the younger brother of the rugby league footballer; Jack Evans. Jack, also a Swinton international, was the landlord of the Royal Oak, 536 Bolton Road, Pendlebury from 1932 onwards. In later years, Jack's son, Stan Evans, was the landlord of the pub whilst Bryn himself helped out behind the bar. Bryn lived in North Drive, Swinton.
