= Bob Valentine (footballer) =

English rugby league player and footballer

Personal information
- Full name: Robert Valentine
- Born: 21 December 1877 Pendleton, Lancashire, England
- Died: 16 January 1926 (aged 48)

Playing information
Club
| Years | Team | Pld | T | G | FG | P |
|---|---|---|---|---|---|---|
| 1899–02 | Swinton | 0 | 0 | 0 | 0 | 0 |
Representative
| Years | Team | Pld | T | G | FG | P |
| 1900–02 | Lancashire | 5 | 2 | 3 | 0 | 12 |
Association football career
- Position: Goalkeeper
Senior career*
| Years | Team | Apps | (Gls) |
| 1903–1908 | Manchester United FC | 10 | (0) |
| Relatives | Jim Valentine (brother) |
- * Club domestic league appearances and goals

Robert Valentine (21 December 1877 – 16 January 1926) was an English rugby league and footballer. In association football, his regular position was as a goalkeeper, and he made ten first team appearances for Manchester United (1903–1908). He also played rugby league for Swinton.

Valentine was born in 1877 in Pendleton, Salford, Lancashire, the youngest son of Robert Valentine, who was in the Navy, and Ann Wallwork Valentine. His elder brother was Swinton legend Jim Valentine (1866–1904). Their father died in 1884 when Robert was 6 years old, and he later moved in with his brother in Irlams o' th' Height.

Valentine died at the original Salford Royal Hospital on Chapel Street/Adelphi Street, Salford in 1926 aged 48. At the time of his death from a long and painful illness he kept a public house in Eccles. He was married, but had no children.
