= Jim Owen =

GB & England international rugby league footballer

Personal information
- Full name: James Reginald Owen

Playing information
- Position: Wing, Centre
Club
| Years | Team | Pld | T | G | FG | P |
|---|---|---|---|---|---|---|
| ≤1921–≥23 | St. Helens Recs |
Representative
| Years | Team | Pld | T | G | FG | P |
| 1921–23 | England | 5 | 4 | 0 | 0 | 12 |
| 1922 | Great Britain | 1 | 0 | 0 | 0 | 0 |

James Reginald Owen was an English professional rugby league footballer who played in the 1920s. He played at representative level for Great Britain and England, and at club level for St. Helens Recs, as a wing or centre.

== Playing career ==
=== Club career ===
Owen played at centre in St. Helens Recs' 17–0 victory over Swinton in the 1923 Lancashire Cup Final during the 1923–24 season at Central Park, Wigan on Saturday 24 November 1923.

=== International honours ===
Owen won caps for England while at St. Helens Recs in 1921 against Wales, Other Nationalities, and Australia, in 1923 against Wales (2 matches), and won a cap for Great Britain while at St. Helens Recs in 1922 against Australia.
