= Jack Evans (rugby, born 1871) =

Wales international rugby union & league footballer

Personal information
- Full name: John Evans
- Born: 23 February 1871 Ammanford, Wales
- Died: 19 July 1924 (aged 53) Prescot, England

Playing information

Rugby union
- Position: Forward
Club
Years	Team	Pld	T	G	FG	P
	Ammanford RFC
189?–97	Llanelli RFC
1897–97	Llwynypia RFC
	Total	0	0	0	0	0
Representative
Years	Team	Pld	T	G	FG	P
1896–97	Wales	3	0	0	0	0

Rugby league
- Position: Forward
Club
Years	Team	Pld	T	G	FG	P
1897–1906	Swinton RLFC	252
Representative
Years	Team	Pld	T	G	FG	P
1898–1903	Lancashire	9
- Relatives: Bryn Evans (son); Jack Evans (son)

John Evans (23 February 1871 – 19 July 1924) was a Welsh international rugby union forward who later 'went North', switching to the professional rugby league code. Evans played for several teams, but is most notable for playing club rugby for Llanelli, and international rugby for Wales.

== Rugby career ==
Evans first played club rugby for his hometown club of Ammanford, before switching to first class Welsh club Llanelli. It was while representing Llanelli that Evans was first selected to play for Wales, in the second game of the 1896 Home Nations Championship. Evans came into a pack along with four other new caps, a reaction by the Welsh selectors to the terrible defeat by England in the previous game. The new players were chosen for their rough physical style of play, and were dubbed 'Rhondda forwards' after the tough coal playing men from that area. The initial decision worked, with Wales winning 6–0 against Scotland at the Cardiff Arms Park. Evans was reselected for the third and final game of the Championship, an away game to Ireland. This time the new forward strategy was not successful with the Irish kick-and-rush tactics, and Wales lost 4–8. Despite the loss Evans was re-selected for the only game Wales played in the 1897 Home Nations Championship. The match saw Wales beat England by a record amount, but due to the Gould affair, Wales left the International Rugby Board, and could not play in any further international games.

In 1897, Evans moved to the Rhondda where he joined valley team Llwynypia, although not a 'Rhondda forward' when first capped for Wales, by the time his international career had ended he was a Rhondda collier. When the next Wales international was played, Evans' position was taken by Hopkin Davies, and Evans was not selected to play for Wales again. It is recorded that Evans eventually switched codes, to professional rugby league joining Swinton RLFC in October 1897, as a forward. Both of his sons, Jack and Bryn played rugby league during the 1920s and 1930s.

=== International matches played ===
Wales

- England 1897
- Scotland 1896
- Ireland 1896

== Bibliography ==
- Godwin, Terry (1984). The International Rugby Championship 1883-1983. Grafton Street, London: Willow Books. ISBN 0-00-218060-X.
- Griffiths, John (1987). The Phoenix Book of International Rugby Records. London: Phoenix House. ISBN 0-460-07003-7.
- Jenkins, John M.; et al. (1991). Who's Who of Welsh International Rugby Players. Wrexham: Bridge Books. ISBN 1-872424-10-4.
- Smith, David; Williams, Gareth (1980). Fields of Praise: The Official History of The Welsh Rugby Union. Cardiff: University of Wales Press. ISBN 0-7083-0766-3.
