= Women's Origin =

- Lancashire Yorkshire
- Sport: Rugby league

Women's Origin describes matches between the Lancashire and Yorkshire women's rugby league teams.

The first women's game between the two sides was in 2014. The series was usually held before the domestic club season and grew from a one-game to a three-game competition. The tournament was held annually until the COVID-19 pandemic of 2020.

In 2024 the fixture returned as a way of developing the England women's national rugby league team.

== Country of Origin series ==
Women's County of Origin series
Tournament information
- Sport: Rugby league
- Established: 2014
- Defunct: 2020
- Administrators: Rugby Football League
- Participants: Lancashire; Yorkshire

=== History ===
In 2014, a pilot County Origin game between Lancashire Ladies and Yorkshire Ladies was held in Wigan. The trophy was won by Lancashire.

The following year, the RFL announced that the 2015 County Origin Series would take place at Thatto Heath Crusaders, St. Helens with the game seeing the sides share the honours after a 22–22 draw, with an attendance of around 500. The match, held on 18 October 2015, followed a Lancashire Girls vs Yorkshire Girls under 18s match, which finished 34–0 in favour of the Yorkshire side.

Lancashire retained the series title following the previous year's draw in 2016, and again in 2018 after no game was played the year prior.

In 2019, the competition was expanded two a two game series. Despite Lancashire hosting both matches, Yorkshire claimed their inaugural title with a 2-0 series victory.

In the competition's final edition, the series was further expanded to three games with Lancashire reclaiming the title, winning two games and drawing the other.

=== Results ===
Women's County of Origin series
Season	Venue	Home team	Score	Away team	Ref
2014	Wigan St Jude's, Wigan	Lancashire	22–0	Yorkshire	
2015	St. Helens	Lancashire	22–22	Yorkshire	
2016	Stanningley	Yorkshire	16–22	Lancashire	
2018	Post Office Road, Featherstone	Yorkshire	10–16	Lancashire	
2019	Bloomfield Road, Blackpool	Lancashire	8–14	Yorkshire	
2019	Halliwell Jones Stadium, Warrington	Lancashire	20–27	Yorkshire	
2019	Yorkshire win series 2–0				
2020	Weetwood sports ground, Leeds	Yorkshire	8–15	Lancashire	
2020	Mount Pleasant, Batley	Yorkshire	12–12	Lancashire	
2020	Weetwood sports ground, Leeds	Yorkshire	0–23	Lancashire	
2020	Lancashire win series 2–0				

== England training ==
=== June 2024 ===
In 2024, the Rugby Football League announced the County of Origin fixture returned would in 2024 ahead of England's mid-season friendly again France. England head coach, Stuart Barlow, selected Lancashire and Yorkshire squads and ran regional training sessions with each culminating in the Origin fixture a week before the England fixture. Match day performances in Origin, and performances in regional training were used to selected the national squad going into the final week of England training.

22 June 2024

Yorkshire	12–20	Lancashire

Crown Flatt, Dewsbury

- Note: Game featured no conversion and unlimited substitutions.

=== October 2024 ===
Ahead of England's post-season friendly against Wales similar regional training camps were used leading up to an Origin game held two weeks before the England international.

19 October 2024

Lancashire	20–12	Yorkshire
Tries: Salihi, Partington, Davies (2), Hunter	Report	Tries: Brown, Hardcastle, Andrade

Boundary Park, Oldham

- Note: Game featured no conversion and unlimited substitutions.

=== August 2025 ===
In June 2025, the RFL announced two Origin fixtures for 2025. The first of which was played as a double-header with a men's academy origin fixture and one week ahead of England mid-season international against Wales.

2 August 2024
14:00 BST (UTC+01:00)

Yorkshire	8–50	Lancashire
Tries: Hook, Stead; Goals: Casey (1/2)	1st: 4–26; 2nd: 4–24; Report	Tries: Hunter (2), Davies, Banks (2), Partington, Jones, Woosey, Rowe; Goals: Rowe (4/6), Salihi (3/3)

Craven Park, Kingston upon Hull
Player of the Match: Grace Banks

=== October 2025 ===
The second game of 2025 will be played in the post season and for the first time won't be played in advance of an England international.

18 October 2025
14:00 BST (UTC+01:00)

Lancashire	20–14	Yorkshire
Tries: Partington, Davies (2), Coleman; Goals: Rowe (2/4)	1st: 10–0; 2nd: 10–14; Report	Tries: Hook, Renouf, Sexton; Goals: Ruby Walker (1/3)

Boundary Park, Oldham
Referee: Tara Jones
Touch judges: Rebecca Floyd and Erin Watson

== See also ==
- Roses rivalry
- Rugby League War of the Roses - Men's equivalent.
- Roses Match - The equivalent match in country cricket.
- State of Origin
- Leeds United F.C.–Manchester United F.C. rivalry - Sometimes known as the roses derby for the same reason.
