= Jack Kenny (rugby league) =

England international rugby league footballer

John Kenny
Personal information
- Full name: John Joseph Kenny
- Born: 26 October 1907; Pendlebury, England
- Died: November 1994 (aged 87) unknown

Playing information
- Position: Wing
Club
Years	Team	Pld	T	G	FG	P
1928/29–30	Leigh	117	44	0	0	132
1930–37	Swinton	231	112	0	0	336
1937–38/39	Leigh
	Total	348	156	0	0	468
Representative
Years	Team	Pld	T	G	FG	P
1932–33	Lancashire	2	0	0	0	0
1936	England	1	0	0	0	0

John Joseph Kenny (26 October 1907 – November 1994) was an English professional rugby league footballer who played in the 1920s and 1930s. He played at representative level for England, and at club level for Leigh (two spells), and Swinton, as a wing.

== Background ==
John Kenny was born in Pendlebury, Lancashire, England, and he died aged 87. John had 5 children, the oldest of which being John Kenny Junior, born December 1932, and Peter Kenny, who went on to play for Swinton Lions.

== Playing career ==
=== County Cup Final appearances ===
Kenny played left wing in Swinton's 8-10 defeat by Salford in the 1931 Lancashire Cup Final during the 1931–32 season at The Cliff, Broughton, Salford on Saturday 21 November 1931.

=== International honours ===
Kenny won a cap for England while at Swinton in 1936 against Wales.
