= Jim Valentine =

England international rugby union, and rugby league footballer

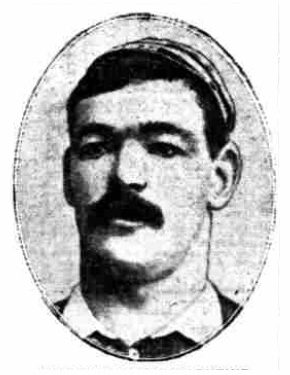

Personal information
- Full name: James Valentine
- Born: 29 July 1866; Pendleton, Salford, Lancashire, England
- Died: 25 July 1904 (aged 37); Barmouth, Merionethshire, Wales

Playing information

Rugby union
- Position: Centre
Club
Years	Team	Pld	T	G	FG	P
1884–96	Swinton	356	262	145
	Lancashire	60
	Total	416	262	145	0	0
Representative
Years	Team	Pld	T	G	FG	P
1890–96	England	4	0	1	0	2

Rugby league
- Position: Forward
Club
Years	Team	Pld	T	G	FG	P
1896–1901	Swinton	130	39	57
Representative
Years	Team	Pld	T	G	FG	P
1896–98	Lancashire	5	2	2	0	10
- Relatives: Bob Valentine (brother)

James Valentine (29 July 1866 – 25 July 1904), also known by the nickname of "Jim Val", was an English rugby union, and semi-professional Northern Union (Rugby Football League (RFL)) footballer who played in the 1880s, 1890s and 1900s. He played representative level rugby union (RU) for England and Lancashire, and at club level for Swinton, as a centre and club level rugby league (RL) for Swinton, as a forward. Prior to 2 June 1896, Swinton was a rugby union club.

== Early life and family ==
Valentine was born in 1866 in Pendleton, Salford, Lancashire, the second son of Robert Valentine, who was in the Navy, and Ann Wallwork Valentine. At age 15, he had already left school and was working as a soap boiler. His younger brother was Bob Valentine, a rugby league footballer (Swinton) and football (Manchester United) goalkeeper. In 1891, he was working as a licensed victualler, and was also listed as operating a pub in 1898, when he married Ada James Worthington, a schoolteacher. He operated the Duchy Inn on Brindle Heath Road, in Pendleton.

== Playing career ==
Valentine began playing rugby at a very young age, being only nine years old when he joined the second team of Brindle Heath Lads Club. He was elected captain of the Pendleton club when it was formed. For a short time he played with Broughton Rangers, but came back to Pendleton to play until 1883, when he joined Swinton. For the next 18 years, his name was synonymous with Swinton.

=== Rugby union career ===
Valentine made his debut for Swinton in January 1884. He was first selected for England while at Swinton in 1888, but due to internal arguments with the other Home Nation unions, England failed to play an international game until 1890. A prolific scorer, during the 1889–1890 season he scored 61 tries, kicked 5 drop goals and kicked 35 goals. He gained his first international cap in 1890 against Wales, and again in 1896 against Wales, Ireland and Scotland. He also played at county level making 60 appearances for Lancashire.

=== Change of code ===
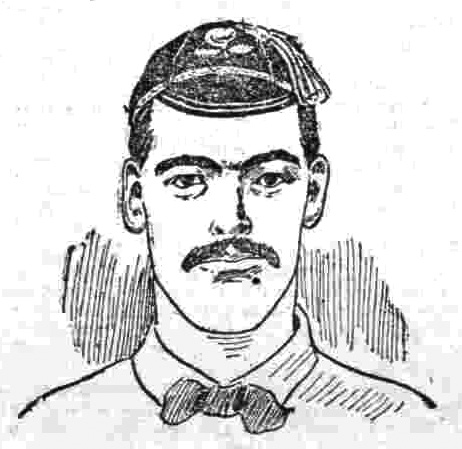
Jim Valentine, 1904 illustration from The Manchester Courier

When Swinton converted from the rugby union code to the Northern Rugby Football Union code on Tuesday 2 June 1896, Jim Valentine was banned by the Rugby Football Union from playing rugby union as he remained with the club when it turned professional. A club favourite, he led Swinton with a 16–8 victory over local rivals Salford in their first Northern Union Challenge Cup Final in 1900, at Fallowfield in Manchester. He remained with the club until 1901.

=== Career records ===
Jim Valentine holds Swinton's "Most Tries in a Rugby Union Season" record, with 48-tries scored during the 1888–89 season. However, Johnny Stopford holds Swinton's "Most Tries in a Rugby League Season" record, with 42-tries scored during the 1963–64 season.

== Death and legacy ==
Valentine was killed when he, his wife and her sister were struck by lightning while on holiday in Barmouth in Wales on 25 July 1904. The severe storm caused the death of several other people who were struck by lightning, although Valentine's wife and her sister recovered. According to one report, Valentine, his wife and his two sisters-in-law were walking on a hill overlooking Barmouth and Cardigan Bay in mid-afternoon when they were suddenly caught in the storm. The first lightning strike lit the gorse-covered hill on fire, and then a second bolt struck Valentine, his wife and her sister Nellie Worthington. Her other sister, nurse Mary Worthington, was walking a few yards behind them and was able to summon immediate help. However, a doctor who arrived within minutes found Jim Valentine already dead.

A Manchester newspaper reported the news with sorrow:

"The event has cast gloom over Barmouth. "Jim" Valentine was known to all footballers as one of the best players who ever donned a jersey. There has been, indeed, no more popular figure in Northern Rugby football. His name primarily, of course, is associated with the Swinton club, of which he was captain for a great number of years—years when the club, perhaps, was in the zenith of its fame. But he was one of the mainstays also of Lancashire County, and in the days of the Rugby Union of the English International team. In his day he could not be beaten as a three-quarter, and was a certain scorer when near the line. His tackling was about his strongest point, and for his club and county he possessed a wonderful record as a try-getter. Though three-quarter was his proper position."

He was buried on 29 July 1904, on what would have been his 38th birthday, at St. John's churchyard in Pendlebury. Thousands of people lined the road to witness the cortège as his body was taken from his house in Pendleton to the churchyard in Pendlebury.

Valentine is also believed to be one of two people after whom the Valentine Cup, a long running amateur rugby competition in the Manchester area, is named.
