= Frank Evans (rugby) =

Great Britain and Wales dual-code rugby international footballer

Personal information
- Full name: Frank Evans
- Born: 3 April 1897 Dafen, Carmarthenshire, Wales
- Died: 30 November 1972 (aged 75) Llanelli, Carmarthenshire, Wales

Playing information

Rugby union
- Position: Wing
Club
Years	Team	Pld	T	G	FG	P
–1921	Llanelli RFC
Representative
Years	Team	Pld	T	G	FG	P
1921	Wales	1	0	0	0	0

Rugby league
- Position: Wing
Club
Years	Team	Pld	T	G	FG	P
1921–31	Swinton					212
Representative
Years	Team	Pld	T	G	FG	P
1924–26	Other Nationalities	2	1	0	0	3
1921–28	Wales	7	7	0	0	21
1924	Great Britain	4	0	0	0	0

Frank Evans (3 April 1897 – 30 November 1972), also known by the nickname of "Frankie Dafen", was a Welsh dual-code international rugby union, and professional rugby league footballer who played in the 1920s and 1930s. He played representative level rugby union (RU) for Wales, and at club level for Llanelli, and representative level rugby league (RL) for Great Britain, Wales and Other Nationalities, and at club level for Swinton, as a wing.

== Background ==
Frank Evans was born in Dafen, Carmarthenshire, and he died aged 75 in Llanelli, Carmarthenshire.

== Playing career ==
=== International honours ===
Evans, known as 'Frankie Dafen' at his club side Llanelli, played in one international match as a rugby union player, for Wales against Scotland as part of the 1921 Five Nations Championship. In August of the same year he switched codes by joining Swinton.

Frank Evans won a cap for Wales (RU) while at Llanelli RFC in 1921 against Scotland, won caps for Wales (RL) while at Swinton 7-caps, won caps for Other Nationalities (RL) while at Swinton in 1924 against England, in 1926 against England, and won caps for Great Britain while at Swinton in 1924 against Australia (2 matches), and New Zealand (2 matches).

=== County Cup Final appearances ===
Frank Evans played right wing in Swinton's 15–11 victory over Wigan in the 1925 Lancashire Cup Final during the 1925–26 season at The Cliff, Broughton, Salford on Wednesday 9 December 1925 (postponed from Saturday 21 November 1925 due to fog), and played right wing in the 5–2 victory over Wigan in the 1927 Lancashire Cup Final during the 1927–28 season at Watersheddings, Oldham on Saturday 19 November 1927.

== Career records ==
Frank Evans is one of less than twenty Welshmen to have scored more than 200-tries in their rugby league career.
