= Charlie Armitt =

England international rugby league footballer

Personal information
- Full name: Charles Armitt
- Born: 10 January 1926; Salford, England
- Died: 17 April 2004 (aged 78)

Playing information
- Position: Second-row
Club
Years	Team	Pld	T	G	FG	P
1947–53	Swinton	145	33	2	0	103
1953–54	Huddersfield
1954–57	Blackpool Borough	97	11	0	0	33
	Total	242	44	2	0	136
Representative
Years	Team	Pld	T	G	FG	P
1949	Lancashire	1	0	0	0	0
1949	England	1	0	0	0	0
- Father: Tommy Armitt

Charles Armitt (10 January 1926 – 17 April 2004) was an English professional rugby league footballer who played in the 1940s and 1950s. He played at representative level for England and Lancashire, and at club level for Swinton, Huddersfield and Blackpool Borough as a second-row.

== Background ==
Charlie Armitt's birth was registered in Salford district, England. He died from cancer in 2004, aged 78.

== Playing career ==
=== Club career ===
Armitt debuted for Swinton in 1947. He was transferred from Swinton to Huddersfield in July 1953. A year later he transferred to Blackpool Borough.

=== Representative honours ===
Armitt won a cap for England while at Swinton in 1949 against Other Nationalities. He also played for Lancashire.

== Personal life ==
Charlie Armitt was the son of the rugby league footballer; Tommy Armitt.
