= Teddy Haines =

England international rugby league footballer

Ted Haines
Personal information
- Full name: Edward Haines
- Born: unknown
- Died: unknown

Playing information
- Position: Second-row
Club
| Years | Team | Pld | T | G | FG | P |
|---|---|---|---|---|---|---|
| 1921–33 | Salford | 342 | 56 | 0 | 0 | 168 |
Representative
| Years | Team | Pld | T | G | FG | P |
| 1927 | England | 1 | 0 | 0 | 0 | 0 |

Edward "Teddy" Haines (birth unknown – death unknown) was an English professional rugby league footballer who played in the 1920s and 1930s He played at representative level for England, and at club level for Salford, as a second-row.

== Club career ==
Haines made his debut for Salford in 1921. He played in the club's 1931–32 Lancashire Cup win against Swinton.

== International honours ==
Teddy Haines won a cap for England while at Salford in 1927 against Wales.
