= 1925–26 Lancashire Cup =

- Structure: Regional knockout competition
- Teams: 13
- Winners: Swinton
- Runners-up: Wigan

The 1925–26 Lancashire Cup was the eighteenth tournament in the history of this regional rugby league competition, and another new name was added to the trophy. This time it was the turn of Swinton, one of the founding members of the Northern Union, whose previous best had been as runners up to Oldham in 1910.

== Background ==
The number of teams entering this year's competition remained at 13 which resulted in 3 byes in the first round.

== Competition and results ==
=== Round 1 ===
Involved 5 matches (with three byes) and 13 clubs

Game No	Fixture date	Home team	Score	Away team	Venue	Att	Rec	Notes	Ref
1	Sat 10 October 1925	Leigh	10–7	Rochdale Hornets	Mather Lane				
2	Sat 10 October 1925	Oldham	14–9	St. Helens	Watersheddings				
3	Sat 10 October 1925	Wigan Highfield	6–7	Salford	Tunstall Lane				
4	Sat 10 October 1925	Barrow	8–0	Widnes	Little Park, Roose				
5	Sat 10 October 1925	Wigan	14–10	Warrington	Central Park				
6		Broughton Rangers		bye					
7		St Helens Recs		bye					
8		Swinton		bye					

=== Round 2 – quarterfinals ===
Game No	Fixture date	Home team	Score	Away team	Venue	Att	Rec	Notes	Ref
1	Mon 19 October 1925	Oldham	8–5	Salford	Watersheddings				
2	Wed 21 October 1925	Wigan	31–8	Broughton Rangers	Central Park				
3	Thu 22 October 1925	Barrow	8–6	Leigh	Little Park, Roose				
4	Thu 22 October 1925	St Helens Recs	7–8	Swinton	City Road				

=== Round 3 – semifinals ===
Game No	Fixture date	Home team	Score	Away team	Venue	Att	Rec	Notes	Ref
1	Mon 2 November 1925	Oldham	5–5	Wigan	Watersheddings				
2	Wed 4 November 1925	Swinton	22–3	Barrow	Chorley Road ground	8,000			
Replay
3	Wed 11 November 1925	Wigan	52–3	Oldham	Central Park				

=== Final ===
The final was due to be played on Saturday, 21 November 1925 but was postponed due to bad weather, in this case fog. The weather during that short period was atrocious and in fact Wigan had 5 matches postponed due to either a waterlogged pitch, a frozen pitch, fog or other bad weather in the four-week period from early November to early December. The final was eventually played on Wednesday 9 December 1925 and Swinton beat Wigan by 15–11. The match was played at the Cliff, Broughton, Salford. The attendance was 15,000 and receipts £1,116.

Game No	Fixture date	Home team	Score	Away team	Venue	Att	Rec	Notes	Ref
	Saturday 21 November 1925	Swinton	post	Wigan	The Cliff			1	
	Wednesday 9 December 1925	Swinton	15–11	Wigan	The Cliff	17,000	£1,115	2	

==== Teams and scorers ====
Swinton	No.	Wigan
	teams	
Jack Pearson	1	Jim Sullivan
Frank Evans	2	Johnny Ring
Hector Halsall (c)	3	Tommy Howley
Jack Evans	4	David Booysen
Chris Brockbank	5	Attie van Heerden
Billo Rees	6	George Owens
Bryn Evans	7	Danny Hurcombe
Miller Strong	8	Wilf Hodder
Henry Blewer	9	Jack Bennett
Bert Morris	10	Bob Ilsley
Tom Halliwell	11	George van Rooyen
Harry Entwistle	12	Frank Stephens
Fred Beswick	13	Jack Price
15	score	11
5	HT	0
	Scorers	
	Tries	
Chris Brockbank (1)	T	Johnny Ring (3)
Jack Evans (1)	T	
Bryn Evans (1)	T	
	Goals	
Bert Morris (3)	G	Jim Sullivan (1)
	G	
	Drop Goals	
	DG	
Referee		

Scoring – Try = three (3) points – Goal = two (2) points – Drop goal = two (2) points

=== The road to success ===
First round
St Helens Recs
bye
Swinton
bye
Widnes	0
Barrow	8
Leigh	10
Rochdale Hornets	7
Wigan	14
Warrington	10
Broughton Rangers
bye
Oldham	14
St. Helens	9
Wigan Highfield	6
Salford	7

Second round
St Helens Recs	7
Swinton	8
Barrow	8
Leigh	6
Wigan	31
Broughton Rangers	8
Oldham	8
Salford	5

Semifinals
Swinton	22
Barrow	3
Oldham	5(52)
Wigan	5(3)

Final
Swinton	15
Wigan	11

== See also ==
- 1925–26 Northern Rugby Football League season

== Notes ==
- 1 Match postponed due to fog
- 2 The Cliff was the home ground of Broughton Rangers from 1913 and until they moved out to Belle Vue in 1933.
