= Lloyd Roby =

English rugby league player

Personal information
- Born: 3 January 1999 (age 27) Warrington, Cheshire, England
- Height: 5 ft 10 in (1.77 m)
- Weight: 13 st 1 lb (83 kg)

Playing information
- Position: Wing, Fullback
Club
Years	Team	Pld	T	G	FG	P
2017–22	Widnes Vikings	52	23	3	0	98
2021(loan)	→ Oldham	2	1	0	0	4
2023	Keighley Cougars	16	3	0	0	12
2024	Widnes Vikings	13	4	0	0	16
2024(loan)	→ Rochdale Hornets	2	0	0	0	0
2025–26	North Wales Crusaders	29	10	6	0	52
2026	Halifax Panthers	9	2	0	0	4
2027–	Swinton Lions	0	0	0	0	0
	Total	123	43	9	0	186
- Source: As of 28 October 2026

Lloyd Roby (born 3 January 1999) is a professional rugby league footballer who plays as a wing or fullback for the Swinton Lions in the Championship.

Roby previously played for the Widnes Vikings, the North Wales Crusaders and the Keighley Cougars. He also appeared on loan from Oldham and Rochdale Hornets

== Background ==
Roby was born in Warrington, Cheshire, England.

== Career ==
=== Widnes ===
In 2017 he made his Widnes début in the Challenge cup against the Warrington Wolves (his hometown club).

Injury caused him to miss the 2018 season and he did not appear again for Widnes until 2019. A brief loan period at Oldham was the only interruption to Roby's career with the Vikings during which he made 52 appearances, scoring 23 tries and kicking 3 goals.

=== Keighley Cougars ===
At the end of the 2022 season, Roby was released by Widnes but signed a two-year deal with Keighley soon after. Recovery from an anterior cruciate ligament injury suffered in June 2022 forced Roby to miss the start of the 2023 season and his Keighley debut did not come until the round eight match against York Knights on 7 April.

=== Widnes (re-join) ===
On 22 November 2023 it was reported that he had re-signed for Widnes in the RFL Championship for 2024 on a one-year deal.

=== North Wales Crusaders ===
On 24 July 2024 it was reported that he had signed for the North Wales Crusaders in RFL League 1.

=== Halifax Panthers ===
On 16 June 2026 it was reported that he had signed for the Halifax Panthers in the Championship.

=== Swinton Lions ===
On 28 October 2026 it was reported that he had signed for Swinton Lions in the RFL Championship
