= Ralph Morgan (rugby) =

Former Wales international rugby league & union footballer

Personal information
- Full name: Douglas Ralph Morgan
- Born: c. 1920 Wales
- Died: May 2009 (aged 88–89)

Playing information
- Weight: 13 st 10 lb (87 kg)

Rugby union
- Position: Fullback
Club
| Years | Team | Pld | T | G | FG | P |
|---|---|---|---|---|---|---|
| | Machen RFC |
| | Cross Keys RFC |
| | Newport Police RFC |
| | Newport RFC | 47 | 0 | 44 | 1 | 105 |
| | Total | 47 | 0 | 44 | 1 | 105 |

Rugby league
- Position: Fullback
Club
| Years | Team | Pld | T | G | FG | P |
|---|---|---|---|---|---|---|
| 1947–52 | Swinton |
| 1952–54 | Leeds |
| 1954–55 | Belle Vue Rangers |
| | Total | 0 | 0 | 0 | 0 | 0 |
Representative
| Years | Team | Pld | T | G | FG | P |
| 1949–50 | Wales | 3 |
- Source: As of 12 May 2012

Douglas Ralph Morgan (c. 1920 – May 2009) was a Welsh rugby union, and professional rugby league footballer who played in the 1940s and 1950s. He played club level rugby union (RU) for Machen RFC, Cross Keys RFC, Newport Police RFC and Newport RFC, as a fullback, and representative level rugby league (RL) for Wales, and at club level for Swinton and Leeds, as a fullback.

Morgan was signed by Leeds from Swinton in October 1952. In September 1954, he was signed by Belle Vue Rangers, where he remained until the club folded a year later.

== International honours ==
Morgan won three caps and was captain for Wales (RL) while at Swinton 1949–1950.
