= Rugby League War of the Roses =

Series of rugby league matches

War of the Roses
- Lancashire Yorkshire
- Sport: Rugby league
- First meeting: 1895
- Latest meeting: 2003

Statistics
- Total meetings: 91
- All-time series: Tied, 44-44-3

The War of the Roses (also known in its later years as the County of Origin Series) was the annual inter-county rugby league match between the historic counties of Lancashire and Yorkshire. The fixture began in 1895 as part of the County Championship until 1983 and continued as a stand-alone fixture until 2003 when the game was last played.

The match achieved prominence because the two counties are considered the 'heartland' of rugby league in Europe and are therefore traditionally the two strongest teams. Furthermore, the neighbours share a historic rivalry originating in the Wars of the Roses (1455–1487) from which the series takes its name.

== History ==
Lancashire and Yorkshire first began contesting rugby league fixture in 1895 – the year of the sport's creation. The games were played as part of the United Kingdom's Inter-County Championship, a competition played every year with exceptions for the two world wars (1914–1918 and 1939–1945) and 1977–1978, until the competition was abandoned in 1983. During this time, the fixture became known as the "War of the Roses". Eligibility to play was established either by county of birth or in which county players had originally played the sport professionally.

The Lancashire vs Yorkshire fixture was often the most popular and highest attended, reflecting the sport's higher popularity in these two counties. As a result, the fixture returned to the British rugby league calendar as a stand-alone match in 1985 and was sponsored by Rodstock. The series lasted until 1991, when it was scrapped due to lack of interest.

In 2001, the fixture was revived under the name of the "County of Origin" series, inspired by the success of Australia's State of Origin series between New South Wales and Queensland. After three years, the Origin series games were discontinued due to a failure to attract high match attendances.

The War of the Roses fixture was proposed for a return for a mid-season clash in 2025. The clubs decided not to go ahead with a fixture in 2025 but would consider re-introducing the fixture in 2026.

== Results ==
The two teams have met in 91 competitive matches with each team having won 44 and three games ending in draws. In addition there have been a number of exhibition matches during the First and Second World Wars when the County Championship was suspended.

Rugby League Roses matches results (Note: Table excludes exhibition matches)
Matches played as part of the County Championship
Season	Date	Venue	Home team	Score	Away team
1895–1896	7 December 1895	Watersheddings, Oldham	Lancashire	0–8	Yorkshire
1895–1896	29 February 1896	Fartown, Huddersfield	Yorkshire	3–8	Lancashire
1896–1897	21 November 1896	Watersheddings, Oldham	Lancashire	7–3	Yorkshire
1897–1898	20 November 1897	Park Avenue, Bradford	Yorkshire	7–6	Lancashire
1898–1899	5 November 1898	New Barnes, Salford	Lancashire	9–20	Yorkshire
1899–1900	4 November 1899	Thrum Hall, Halifax	Yorkshire	13–16	Lancashire
1900–1901	3 November 1900	The Athletic Grounds, Rochdale	Lancashire	24–5	Yorkshire
1901–1902	15 February 1902	The Boulevard, Hull	Yorkshire	13–8	Lancashire
1902–1903	15 November 1902	The Willows, Salford	Lancashire	13–0	Yorkshire
1903–1904	14 November 1903	Headingley, Leeds	Yorkshire	0–8	Lancashire
1904–1905	12 November 1904	Watersheddings, Oldham	Lancashire	5–14	Yorkshire
1905–1906	4 November 1905	The Boulevard, Hull	Yorkshire	0–8	Lancashire
1906–1907	3 November 1906	The Willows, Salford	Lancashire	19–0	Yorkshire
1907–1908	2 November 1907	Thrum Hall, Halifax	Yorkshire	15–11	Lancashire
1908–1909	31 October 1908	The Willows, Salford	Lancashire	13–0	Yorkshire
1909–1910	4 November 1909	The Boulevard, Hull	Yorkshire	27–14	Lancashire
1910–1911	7 November 1910	Central Park, Wigan	Lancashire	17–3	Yorkshire
1911–1912	25 January 1912	Thrum Hall, Halifax	Yorkshire	12–13	Lancashire
1912–1913	16 December 1912	Watersheddings, Oldham	Lancashire	8–20	Yorkshire
1913–1914	10 December 1913	Fartown, Huddersfield	Yorkshire	19–11	Lancashire
1919–1920	24 September 1919	The Cliff, Broughton	Lancashire	15–5	Yorkshire
1920–1921	21 October 1920	The Boulevard, Hull	Yorkshire	18–3	Lancashire
1921–1922	4 October 1921	The Athletic Grounds, Rochdale	Lancashire	2–5	Yorkshire
1922–1923	7 December 1922	Craven Park, Hull	Yorkshire	11–11	Lancashire
1923–1924	8 December 1923	Watersheddings, Oldham	Lancashire	6–5	Yorkshire
1924–1925	29 November 1924	Thrum Hall, Halifax	Yorkshire	9–28	Lancashire
1925–1926	12 December 1925	City Road, St Helens	Lancashire	26–10	Yorkshire
1926–1927	30 October 1926	Belle Vue, Wakefield	Yorkshire	13–18	Lancashire
1927–1928	29 October 1927	Wilderspool, Warrington	Lancashire	35–19	Yorkshire
1928–1929	3 November 1928	Thrum Hall, Halifax	Yorkshire	10–33	Lancashire
1929–1930	22 March 1930	The Athletic Grounds, Rochdale	Lancashire	18–3	Yorkshire
1930–1931	18 October 1930	Belle Vue, Wakefield	Yorkshire	25–15	Lancashire
1931–1932	17 October 1931	Wilderspool, Warrington	Lancashire	11–8	Yorkshire
1932–1933	29 October 1932	Belle Vue, Wakefield	Yorkshire	30–3	Lancashire
1933–1934	25 September 1933	Watersheddings, Oldham	Lancashire	12–15	Yorkshire
1934–1935	9 January 1935	Headingley, Leeds	Yorkshire	5–5	Lancashire
1935–1936	12 October 1935	Naughton Park, Widnes	Lancashire	16–5	Yorkshire
1936–1937	21 October 1936	Wheldon Road, Castleford	Yorkshire	6–28	Lancashire
1937–1938	12 February 1938	The Athletic Grounds, Rochdale	Lancashire	10–9	Yorkshire
1938–1939	26 October 1938	Headingley, Leeds	Yorkshire	10–10	Lancashire
1945–1946	10 November 1945	Station Road, Swinton	Lancashire	17–16	Yorkshire
1946–1947	9 November 1946	Parkside, Hunslet	Yorkshire	13–10	Lancashire
1947–1948	12 November 1947	Central Park, Wigan	Lancashire	22–10	Yorkshire
1948–1949	3 May 1949	Thrum Hall, Halifax	Yorkshire	3–12	Lancashire
1949–1950	5 October 1949	Wilderspool, Warrington	Lancashire	22–13	Yorkshire
1950–1951	18 October 1950	Fartown, Huddersfield	Yorkshire	23–15	Lancashire
1951–1952	10 October 1951	Kirkhall Lane, Leigh	Lancashire	5–15	Yorkshire
1952–1953	28 April 1953	The Boulevard, Hull	Yorkshire	16–8	Lancashire
1953–1954	14 October 1953	Hilton Park, Leigh	Lancashire	18–10	Yorkshire
1954–1955	6 October 1954	Odsal, Bradford	Yorkshire	20–10	Lancashire
1955–1956	26 September 1955	Watersheddings, Oldham	Lancashire	26–10	Yorkshire
1956–1957	26 September 1956	The Boulevard, Hull	Yorkshire	21–35	Lancashire
1957–1958	23 September 1957	Naughton Park, Widnes	Lancashire	11–25	Yorkshire
1958–1959	24 September 1958	Craven Park, Hull	Yorkshire	35–19	Lancashire
1958–1959	29 October 1958	Hilton Park, Leigh	Lancashire	15–16	Yorkshire
1959–1960	11 November 1959	Hilton Park, Leigh	Lancashire	28–38	Yorkshire
1960–1961	31 August 1960	Belle Vue, Wakefield	Yorkshire	20–21	Lancashire
1961–1962	9 October 1961	Hilton Park, Leigh	Lancashire	14–12	Yorkshire
1962–1963	26 September 1962	Belle Vue, Wakefield	Yorkshire	22–8	Lancashire
1963–1964	11 September 1963	Knowsley Road, St Helens	Lancashire	45–20	Yorkshire
1964–1965	23 September 1964	The Boulevard, hull	Yorkshire	33–10	Lancashire
1965–1966	10 November 1965	Station Road, Swinton	Lancashire	13–16	Yorkshire
1966–1967	21 September 1966	Headingley, Leeds	Yorkshire	17–22	Lancashire
1967–1968	24 January 1968	Naughton Park, Widnes	Lancashire	23–17	Yorkshire
1968–1969	25 September 1968	Craven Park, Hull	Yorkshire	10–5	Lancashire
1969–1970	3 September 1969	The Willows, Salford	Lancashire	14–12	Yorkshire
1970–1971	13 January 1971	Wheldon Road, Castleford	Yorkshire	32–12	Lancashire
1970–1971	24 February 1971	Wheldon Road, Castleford	Yorkshire	34–8	Lancashire
1971–1972	29 September 1971	Hilton Park, Leigh	Lancashire	22–42	Yorkshire
1972–1973	11 October 1972	Wheldon Road, Castleford	Yorkshire	32–18	Lancashire
1973–1974	19 September 1973	Naughton Park, Widnes	Lancashire	17–15	Yorkshire
1974–1975	25 September 1974	Lawkholme Lane, Keighley	Yorkshire	20–14	Lancashire
1974–1975	16 October 1974	Naughton Park, Widnes	Lancashire	29–11	Yorkshire
1975–1976	20 December 1975	Central Park, Wigan	Lancashire	7–17	Yorkshire
1976–1977	1 March 1977	Wheldon Road, Castleford	Yorkshire	18–13	Lancashire
1977–1978 (Note: Played as the Queen's Silver Jubilee Fund match)	19 October 1977	Naughton Park, Widnes	Lancashire	33–8	Yorkshire
1978–1979	27 September 1978	Naughton Park, Widnes	Lancashire	23–7	Yorkshire
1979–1980	12 September 1979	Wheldon Road, Castleford	Yorkshire	19–16	Lancashire
1980–1981	24 September 1980	Naughton Park, Widnes	Lancashire	17–9	Yorkshire
1981–1982	9 September 1981	Wheldon Road, Castleford	Yorkshire	21–15	Lancashire
1982–1983	26 May 1982	Hilton Park, Leigh	Lancashire	21–22	Yorkshire

Match played as "Rodstock War of the Roses"
Season	Date	Venue	Home team	Score	Away team
1985–1986	11 September 1985	Central Park, Wigan	Lancashire	10–26	Yorkshire
1986–1987	17 September 1986	Headingley, Leeds	Yorkshire	26–14	Lancashire
1987–1988	16 September 1987	Central Park, Wigan	Lancashire	10–16	Yorkshire
1988–1989	21 September 1988	Headingley, Leeds	Yorkshire	24–14	Lancashire
1989–1990	20 September 1989	Central Park, Wigan	Lancashire	12–56	Yorkshire
1991–1992	18 September 1991	Headingley, Leeds	Yorkshire	17–12	Lancashire

Match played as the "County of Origin Series"
Season	Date	Venue	Home team	Score	Away team
2001	5 June 2001	Headingley, Leeds	Yorkshire	24–36	Lancashire
2002	14 June 2002	JJB Stadium, Wigan	Lancashire	22–18	Yorkshire
2002	18 June 2002	Headingley, Leeds	Yorkshire	28–36	Lancashire
2003	2 July 2003	Odsal, Bradford	Yorkshire	56–6	Lancashire

== See also ==
- Women's Origin
- International Origin
- Roses Match - The equivalent match in country cricket.
- Leeds United F.C.–Manchester United F.C. rivalry - Sometimes known as the roses derby for the same reason.
