= Tommy Armitt =

GB & England international rugby league footballer

Personal information
- Full name: Thomas Armitt
- Born: 1 April 1904 Salford, England
- Died: 15 October 1972 (aged 68) Salford, England

Playing information
- Position: Hooker
Club
Years	Team	Pld	T	G	FG	P
1931–46	Swinton	354	24	6	0	84
1943–44	→ Hull F.C. (guest)
	Total	354	24	6	0	84
Representative
Years	Team	Pld	T	G	FG	P
1933–38	Lancashire	13	1	0	0	3
1935–39	England	10	1	0	0	3
1933–37	Great Britain	8	0	0	0	0
Association football career
- Position: Centre-half
Senior career*
Years	Team	Apps	(Gls)
1926	Accrington Stanley F.C.	1	(0)
Relatives	Charlie Armitt (son)
- * Club domestic league appearances and goals

Thomas Armitt (1 April 1904 – 15 October 1972) was an English professional rugby league footballer who played in the 1930s and 1940s. He played at representative level for Great Britain, England and Lancashire, and at club level for Swinton, and wartime guest at Hull FC, as a hooker. In 1926 he played one match as centre-half in the Football League Third Division North for Accrington Stanley F.C.

== Background ==
Tommy Armitt's birth was registered in Salford, Lancashire, England, and he died aged 68 in Salford, Lancashire, England.

== Playing career ==
=== Swinton ===
Armitt debuted for Swinton in August 1931.

Armitt helped the club win the 1939–40 Lancashire Cup, playing in both legs of the final against Widnes. He also played against French club SA Villeneuvois in the 1935 Match of Champions.

=== Representative honours ===
Armitt won caps for England while at Swinton in 1935 against France and Wales, in 1936 against Wales (two matches) and France, in 1937 against France, in 1938 against Wales (two matches) and France, and in 1939 against Wales, and won caps for Great Britain while at Swinton in 1933 against Australia, in 1936 against Australia (two matches), and New Zealand (two matches), and in 1937 against Australia (three matches).

Armitt played hooker in Lancashire's 7-5 victory over Australia in the 1937–38 Kangaroo tour match at Wilderspool Stadium, Warrington on Wednesday 29 September 1937, in front of a crowd of 16,250.

== Personal life ==
Tommy Armitt was the father of the rugby league footballer; Charlie Armitt.
