= Grace Banks =

England international rugby league footballer

Personal information
- Born: 21 September 2005 (age 21) Orrell, Wigan, England

Playing information
- Position: Fullback
Club
| Years | Team | Pld | T | G | FG | P |
|---|---|---|---|---|---|---|
| 2023– | Wigan Warriors | 50 | 44 | 0 | 0 | 176 |
Representative
| Years | Team | Pld | T | G | FG | P |
| 2025 | England | 1 | 0 | 0 | 0 | 0 |
- Source: As of 11 October 2025

Grace Banks (born 21 September 2005) is an English rugby league footballer who plays as a fullback for Wigan Warriors in the Women's Super League and England at international level.

== Club career ==
Banks started playing rugby for Leigh Miners before being signed by Wigan as a member of the club's academy squad. Banks' mum, Genna, is a former rugby league player who represented Lancashire, and who is currently Head of Youth Development for the Women & Girls pathway at Wigan Warriors.

=== 2023 ===
Banks made her debut for Wigan Warriors against Warrington Wolves in round 1 of the 2023 season, in a 22–22 draw.

She quickly established herself in the side, scoring her first try Wigan Warriors in round 1 of the 2023 Women's Challenge Cup, in a 38–20 win over Cardiff Demons. She then scored her first hatrick for Wigan, in round 3 of the same competition, in a 60–0 win over Salford Red Devils at Robin Park Arena.

Banks played 14 times in the 2023 season, scoring three times in the league, and 5 times in the Challenge Cup, where Wigan were knocked out in the semi finals by Leeds Rhinos, losing 16–4 at Headingley Stadium.

=== 2024 ===
Banks played 15 times in the 2024 season, scoring 11 times in the league, and twice in the Challenge Cup, with Wigan once again losing to Leeds Rhinos at the semi final stage, this time 20–34 at the Totally Wicked stadium.

=== 2025 ===
On 7 June, Banks played in the 2025 Women's Challenge Cup final, with Wigan defeating St Helens 42–6. Banks scored 5 times in 5 appearances in the competition, as Wigan claimed their maiden title.

Banks finished the season with 17 tries, and she was part of the Wigan Warriors side that completed the treble in the 2025 season, winning the League Leader's Shield, Super League, Women's Challenge Cup, and also winning the RFL Women's Nines.

== International career ==
On 9 August 2025, Banks made her first senior appearance for England against Wales.

== Club statistics ==
| Club | Season | Tier | App | T | G | DG | Pts |
|---|---|---|---|---|---|---|---|
| Wigan Warriors | 2023 | Super League | 14 | 8 | 0 | 0 | 32 |
| Wigan Warriors | 2024 | Super League | 15 | 13 | 0 | 0 | 52 |
| Wigan Warriors | 2025 | Super League | 18 | 22 | 0 | 0 | 88 |
| Wigan Warriors | 2026 | Super League | 3 | 1 | 0 | 0 | 4 |
| Wigan Warriors | Total | | 50 | 44 | 0 | 0 | 176 |
| Career total | | | 50 | 44 | 0 | 0 | 176 |

== Honours ==
=== Wigan Warriors ===
- Super League
  - Winners (1): 2025
  - League Leader's Shield (1): 2025
- Challenge Cup
  - Winners (1): 2025
- RFL Women's Nines
  - Winners (2): 2024, 2025
