= Fergie Southward =

English rugby league footballer

- Ogden's Cigarette card featuring Ferguson Southward

Personal information
- Full name: Ferguson Southward
- Born: 21 October 1898 Cockermouth, England
- Died: December 1981 (aged 83) Cockermouth, England

Playing information
Club
Years	Team	Pld	T	G	FG	P
1921–33	Salford	350	90	158	0	586
Representative
Years	Team	Pld	T	G	FG	P
1922–32	Cumberland	26	6	4	0	26

Ferguson Southward (21 October 1898 – December 1981) was an English professional rugby league footballer who played in the 1920s. He played at representative level for Cumberland, and at club level for Salford.

== Background ==
Southward was born in Cockermouth, Cumberland, England, and he died aged 83 in Cockermouth, Cumbria, England.

== Playing career ==
=== County honours ===
Southward represented Cumberland while at Salford.
