= Martin Hodgson =

Former Great Britain and England international rugby league footballer

Personal information
- Born: 26 March 1909 Egremont, England
- Died: 23 July 1991 (aged 82) Swinton, England

Playing information
- Position: Second-row
Club
Years	Team	Pld	T	G	FG	P
1927–40	Swinton	473	39	870	0	1857
Representative
Years	Team	Pld	T	G	FG	P
1927–39	Cumberland	29	4	17	0	46
1928–37	England	9	0	10	0	20
1929–37	Great Britain	16	0	8	0	16

Martin Hodgson (26 March 1909 – 23 July 1991) was an English rugby league footballer who played in the 1920s, 1930s and 1940s. Lauded as one of the game's greatest ever second-rows, he represented Great Britain, England and Cumberland on many occasions. Hodgson played his entire club career with Swinton with whom he won two Championships. He toured Australasia in 1932 and 1936 with the Great Britain lions, and became the only British forward to appear in five Ashes-winning squads, between 1929 and 1937.

== Biography ==
Martin Hodgson was born in Egremont, Cumberland, England, he worked in the heat treating department at David Brown Ltd. in Lockwood, Huddersfield, he was the landlord of The Unicorn public house (now demolished), Shambles Lane, Huddersfield c. 1950–55, and he died aged 82 in Swinton, Greater Manchester, England.

=== Playing career ===
Hodgson signed for rugby league club Swinton aged 17 during January 1927, he became a goal-kicking second-row for Swinton, with whom he reached the final of the 1927 Lancashire Cup, playing in their victory over Wigan. He won caps for Great Britain while at Swinton in 1929-30 against Australia (2 matches), in 1932 against Australia (3 matches), New Zealand (3 matches), in 1933 against Australia (3 matches), in 1936 against Australia (3 matches), New Zealand, and in 1937 against Australia. Hodgson also won caps for England while at Swinton in 1928 against Wales, in 1929 against Other Nationalities, in 1932 against Wales, in 1935 against France, in 1936 against Wales (2 matches), France, in 1937 against France.

During the 1929–30 Kangaroo tour of Great Britain Hodgson played as a second-row in the 2nd and 3rd Ashes series Test matches against Australia, helping the hosts retain the title. He was selected to go on the 1932 Great Britain Lions tour, playing as a New Zealand. In 1931 Hodgson's Swinton side won the Championship. During the 1933–34 Kangaroo tour of Great Britain he was a second-row for the Great Britain side that became the first to defeat Australia in all three Ashes tests. In 1935 Hodgson was again part of a Swinton Championship-winning side. He played in the 1935 Match of Champions for the English Champions against the French champions.

Hodgson was selected to go on the 1936 Great Britain Lions tour, playing at second-row and kicking goals in all three Ashes tests against Australia. His goal kicking proved decisive in the third and deciding test. During the 1937–38 Kangaroo tour he played in one test match for England and one tour match for Swinton against the Australians.

In April 1940 at a match for Swinton against Rochdale Hornets at the Athletic Grounds, Rochdale, Hodgson set the long-distance penalty goal record with a kick of 77.75 yards (71.09 m) in (This record is disputed. Arthur Atkinson of Castleford kicked a penalty goal from 75-yards in the 20-10 victory over St. Helens at Knowsley Road, St. Helens on Saturday 26 October 1929). Swinton reached the final of the 1940 Lancashire Cup, and Hodgson played in their victory over Widnes in the final.

=== After retirement ===
In 2005 Hodgson was inducted into the British Rugby League Hall of Fame.
