= Yorkshire rugby league team =

English representative rugby league team

Team information
- Governing body: Rugby Football League

Team results
- First game
- Yorkshire 5–9 Cheshire (Headingley, Leeds; 25 November 1895)
- First international
- Yorkshire 4–23 New Zealand (Belle Vue, Wakefield; 18 December 1907)
- Biggest win
- Yorkshire 40–0 Cheshire (Belle Vue, Wakefield; 20 October 1900)
- Biggest defeat
- Yorkshire 11–55 Australia (Fartown Ground, Huddersfield; 26 November 1952)

The Yorkshire rugby league team is an English representative rugby league team consisting of players who were born in the historic county of Yorkshire or first played for a Yorkshire club.

== Rivalry ==
Until 2003, Yorkshire played Lancashire in the annual War of the Roses game. This match was part of the County Championship until 1983 when the competition stopped and Roses went on to become a stand-alone event.

== Results ==
Yorkshire played in the County Championship from its inception in 1895 to its final season in 1983. They have also played against international representative sides during tours to Great Britain.

=== County Championship Results ===
Titles 24: 1897–1898, 1898–1899, 1904–1905, 1909–1910, 1912–1913, 1920–1921, 1921–1922, 1922–1923, 1930–1931, 1946–1947, 1951–1952, 1953–1954, 1954–1955, 1957–1958, 1958–1959, 1962–1963, 1964–1965, 1968–1969, 1970–1971, 1971–1972, 1972–1973, 1975–1976, 1976–1977, 1982–1983.

=== War of the Roses ===
Titles 44

=== International Results ===
Date	Opposition	Result	Venue	Attendance	Tour
18 December 1907	New Zealand	4–23	Belle Vue, Wakefield	3,000	1907–08 All Golds tour
5 November 1908	Australia	11–21	The Boulevard, Kingston upon Hull	3,500	1908–09 Kangaroo tour
25 September 1911	(Australia) (New Zealand) Australasia	31–33	Bramall Lane, Sheffield	4,000	1911–12 Kangaroo tour
7 December 1921	(Australia) (New Zealand) Australasia	8–24	Belle Vue, Wakefield	6,000	1921–22 Kangaroo tour
15 December 1926	New Zealand	17–16	Fartown, Huddersfield	3,000	1926–27 Kiwis tour
20 November 1929	Australia	12–25	Belle Vue, Wakefield	7,011	1929–30 Kangaroo tour
13 September 1933	Australia	0–13	Headingley, Leeds	10,309	1933–34 Kangaroo tour
6 October 1937	Australia	4–8	Odsal, Bradford	7,570	1937–38 Kangaroo tour
18 September 1939	New Zealand	C–C	Odsal, Bradford	N/A	1939 Kiwis tour
24 November 1948	Australia	5–2	Headingley, Leeds	5,310	1948–49 Kangaroo tour
5 December 1951	New Zealand	3–10	Wakefield	2,958	1951 Kiwis tour
26 November 1952	Australia	11–55	Fartown, Huddersfield	3,737	1952–53 Kangaroo tour
21 September 1955	New Zealand	17–33	Boulevard, Hull	7,407	1955 Kiwis tour
28 September 1959	Australia	47–15	Clarence Street, York	7,338	1959–60 Kangaroo tour
6 September 1961	New Zealand	21–11	Boulevard, Hull	6,650	1961 Kiwis tour
18 September 1963	Australia	11–5	Craven Park, Kingston upon Hull	10,324	1963–64 Kangaroo tour
20 September 1963	New Zealand	15–8	Wheldon Road, Castleford	14,814	1963 Kiwis tour
4 October 1967	Australia	15–14	Belle Vue, Wakefield	19,370	1967–68 Kangaroo tour
23 October 1985	New Zealand	18–8	Odsal, Bradford	3,745	1985 Kiwis tour
27 October 1987	Papua New Guinea	28–4	Headingley, Leeds	1,780	1987 Kumuls tour

== Women's team ==
The Yorkshire women's team was set up in 2014 for a pilot Origin competition with the aim to help develop the England women's national rugby league team. The pilot was deemed a success, and saw the team return for 2015 played as an annual fixture until 2020. In 2024, the origin fixture returned and formed part of the England selection process.

=== Current Team ===
For 2024

Amelia Brown (Huddersfield Giants), Caitlin Beevers (Leeds Rhinos), Chloe Billington (Featherstone Rovers), Jasmine Bell (York Valkyrie), Keara Bennett, Caitlin Casey, Ruby Enright, Grace Field (all Leeds Rhinos) Liv Gale (York Valkyrie), Amy Hardcastle (Leeds Rhinos), Georgie Hetherington (York Valkyrie), Phoebe Hook (St Helens), Shona Hoyle, Zoe Hornby (both Leeds Rhinos), Emma Kershaw (York Valkyrie), Lucy Murray, Izzy Northrop (both Leeds Rhinos), Jess Sharp (York Valkyrie), Bella Sykes (Leeds Rhinos), Dannielle Waters (Featherstone Rovers), Olivia Whitehead (Leeds Rhinos) Liv Wood (York Valkyrie).

=== Results ===
==== Women's Origin ====
Titles 2: 2015 (shared), 2019

== See also ==
- Yorkshire football team
