= Joe Wright (rugby league) =

GB & England international rugby league footballer

Personal information
- Full name: Joseph Wright
- Born: 28 June 1908; Carlisle, England
- Died: April 1967 (aged 58)

Playing information
- Position: Prop, Second-row
Club
| Years | Team | Pld | T | G | FG | P |
|---|---|---|---|---|---|---|
| 1928–45 | Swinton | 418 | 14 | 7 | 0 | 56 |
Representative
| Years | Team | Pld | T | G | FG | P |
| 1930–38 | Cumberland | 19 | 2 | 0 | 0 | 6 |
| 1932–33 | England | 2 | 0 | 0 | 0 | 0 |
| 1932–34 | Great Britain | 2 | 0 | 0 | 0 | 0 |

Joseph Wright (28 June 1908 – 1967) was an English professional rugby league footballer who played in the 1930s. He played at representative level for Great Britain and England, and at club level for Swinton, and as a prop, or second-row.

== International honours ==
Joe Wright won caps for England while at Swinton in 1932 against Wales, in 1933 against Other Nationalities, and in 1934 against France, and won a cap for Great Britain while at Swinton in 1932 against New Zealand.
