= Arthur Hickman =

Wales international rugby union & league footballer

Personal information
- Full name: Arthur Hickman
- Born: 6 August 1910; Skewen, Wales
- Died: 1 February 1995 (aged 84)

Playing information

Rugby union
- Position: Wing
Club
Years	Team	Pld	T	G	FG	P
≤1930–34	Neath RFC
Representative
Years	Team	Pld	T	G	FG	P
1930–33	Wales	2	0	0	0	0

Rugby league
Club
Years	Team	Pld	T	G	FG	P
1934–42	Swinton	162	43	0	0	129

Arthur Hickman (6 August 1910 – 1 February 1995) was a Welsh rugby union, and professional rugby league footballer who played in the 1930s. He played representative level rugby union (RU) for Wales, and at club level for Neath RFC, as a Wing, and club level rugby league (RL) for Swinton.

== Background ==
Arthur Hickman was born in Skewen, Wales.

== International honours ==
Arthur Hickman won caps for Wales (RU) while at Neath RFC in 1930 against England, and in 1933 against Scotland.
