= 1927–28 Northern Rugby Football League season =

- League: Championship
- Teams: 28
- Champions: Swinton (2nd title)
- League Leaders: Swinton
- Runners-up: Featherstone Rovers
- Top point-scorer(s): (England) Joe Thompson ( Leeds) (233)
- Top try-scorer(s): (England) Alf Ellaby ( St Helens) (37)
- Resigned from the League: Pontypridd

The 1927–28 Rugby Football League season was the 33rd season of rugby league football. Swinton won All four cups.

== Season summary ==
Swinton won their second, and successive, Championship when they defeated Featherstone Rovers 11-0 in the play-off final. Swinton had also ended the regular season as the league leaders.

The Challenge Cup Winners were Swinton who beat Warrington 5-3 in the final.

Pontypridd resigned from the League after playing 8 games, and their record was expunged from the table. They won 1 and lost 7, scoring 46 and conceding 149. 1927-28.

Swinton won the Lancashire League, and Leeds won the Yorkshire League. Swinton beat Wigan 5–2 to win the Lancashire Cup, and Dewsbury beat Hull F.C. 8–2 to win the Yorkshire County Cup.

== Championship ==
	Team	Pld	W	D	L	PF	PA	Pts	Pct
1	Swinton	36	27	3	6	439	189	57	79.10
2	Leeds	42	32	0	10	619	307	64	76.19
3	Featherstone Rovers	36	25	1	10	387	234	51	70.83
4	Hunslet	40	28	0	12	546	308	56	70.00
5	St Helens Recs	36	24	0	12	499	251	48	66.66
6	Oldham	36	23	1	12	422	261	47	65.27
7	Wigan Highfield	32	19	1	12	272	240	39	60.93
8	Wigan	40	24	0	16	601	345	48	60.00
9	Leigh	34	20	0	14	298	236	40	58.82
10	Wakefield Trinity	40	22	2	16	476	355	46	57.50
11	St. Helens	36	19	1	16	485	336	39	54.17
12	Huddersfield	40	21	1	18	475	341	43	53.75
13	Hull Kingston Rovers	38	17	5	16	342	333	39	51.31
14	Halifax	40	19	2	19	341	328	40	50.00
15	Dewsbury	38	17	3	18	334	329	37	48.68
16	Bradford Northern	32	13	2	17	204	333	28	43.75
17	Warrington	36	14	2	20	352	483	30	41.66
18	Barrow	34	13	1	20	249	337	27	39.70
19	Batley	38	14	2	22	264	466	30	39.47
20	Hull	38	12	6	20	312	347	30	39.47
21	York	36	13	1	22	233	350	27	37.50
22	Keighley	36	13	1	22	230	415	27	37.50
23	Widnes	32	11	0	21	196	418	22	34.37
24	Rochdale Hornets	34	11	1	22	192	448	23	33.82
25	Castleford	32	9	3	20	217	389	21	32.81
26	Salford	32	9	1	22	220	434	19	29.68
27	Broughton Rangers	32	8	0	24	295	450	16	25.00
28	Bramley	32	7	0	25	175	402	14	21.87

== Championship play-off ==
Semi-finals
1	Swinton	12
4	Hunslet	2
2	Leeds	12
3	Featherstone Rovers	15

Championship final
Swinton	11
Featherstone Rovers	0

== Challenge Cup ==
Swinton beat Warrington 5-3 in the final played at Wigan in front of a crowd of 33,909.

This was Swinton’s third Challenge Cup Final win from four Final appearances and completed a League and Cup double for the club.

== Sources ==
- 1927-28 Rugby Football League season at wigan.rlfans.com
- The Challenge Cup at The Rugby Football League website
