= Watersheddings =

Former rugby league stadium in Oldham, England

- Interactive map of Watersheddings
- Full name: Watersheddings
- Location: Oldham, England
- Coordinates: 53.552187872759°N 2.0825211032933°W
- Capacity: 9,000
- Record attendance: 28,000

Construction
- Built: 1889
- Opened: 1889
- Closed: 1997

Tenant
- Oldham Rugby League Club (1889–1997)

Watersheddings was the site of a former rugby league stadium in the Watersheddings area of Oldham in Greater Manchester, England. Historically it was in Lancashire, lying on the A672 (Ripponden Road) approximately 2 miles north east of Oldham town centre.

Watersheddings was reportedly the highest professional RL ground in the UK at 770 ft above sea level, which would also list it as the highest ground of any professional sport in the UK.

== Origins ==
The stadium known as Watersheddings, named after the area of Oldham where it was located, was built in 1889. It was constructed on the east side of a reservoir, Ruby Mill and Longfield Mill and north of Longfield Lane. At the same time the Oldham Cricket Ground was built adjacent to the stadium on its east side and a lawn tennis ground was constructed on its north side.

== History ==
Oldham Football Club (more commonly known as Oldham Rugby League Football Club) moved from their Clarksfield Ground and played their first match at the new Watersheddings stadium on 28 September 1889 against Swinton.

In 1904 Watershedding was selected to host the very first Rugby league International between England and Other Nationalities on New Year's Day 1904 but the game was cancelled due to a frozen pitch, and held instead in April at Central Park, Wigan. In 1912, the stadium achieved its highest ever attendance of 28,000 against Huddersfield. In the 1914/15 season Watershedding was selected to host the Challenge Cup final

year	Teams	Score	Team	Attendance
1914–15	Huddersfield	37–3	St. Helens	8,000

In 1933 the cricket ground was demolished making way for the Oldham Greyhound Stadium; the south stand and kennels were erected next to the south-east corner of the Watersheddings ground. The Watersheddings floodlights were used for the first time on Wednesday 20 October 1965, when a crowd of 6,333 attended an under-24 international between Great Britain and France.

== Closure ==
The club left Watersheddings in 1997 and, now called Oldham R.L.F.C., moved to Oldham Athletic AFC's Boundary Park stadium before they moved to Whitebank Stadium in 2010. The Watersheddings site was redeveloped into housing now called Watersheddings Way and Hutchins Lane.

== County games ==
Watersheddings also hosted numerous county vs county games with Lancashire hosting various other county sides including the Rugby League War of the Roses matches against Yorkshire. The results were as follows:

Game	Date	Result	Attendance
1	7 December 1895	Yorkshire def. Lancashire 8–0	9,059
2	21 November 1896	Lancashire def. Yorkshire 7–3	7,000
3	16 October 1897	Lancashire def. Cheshire 11–10	7,000
4	21 October 1899	Lancashire def. (Cumbria) Cumberland 17–7	8,500
5	12 November 1904	Yorkshire def. Lancashire 14–5	8,500

== Australia and New Zealand ==
The stadium, in its time, played host to many Australian and New Zealand national teams who played tour games against Oldham and the Lancashire county side, the first being against the 1907 touring New Zealand team, the last being against Australia in 1986.

Game	Date	Result	Attendance	Notes
1	23 November 1907	Oldham def. New Zealand 8–7	15,000	1907–08 All Golds tour
2	18 January 1908	Lancashire def. New Zealand 20–4		1907–08 All Golds tour
3	26 December 1908	Oldham def. Australia 11–5	15,000	1908–09 Kangaroo tour
4	11 November 1911	Oldham def. Australasia 14–8	10,000	1911–12 Kangaroo tour
5	26 November 1921	Australasia def. Oldham 16–5	15,344	1921–22 Kangaroo tour
6	16 January 1922	Oldham def. Australasia 15–5	6,000	1921–22 Kangaroo tour
7	23 October 1926	Oldham def. New Zealand 15–10	16,000	1926–27 New Zealand Kiwis tour
8	2 November 1929	Australia def. Oldham 18–10	19,284	1929–30 Kangaroo tour
9	9 September 1933	Australia def. Oldham 38–6	5,000	1933–34 Kangaroo tour
10	6 November 1937	Australia def. Oldham 10–6	12,265	1937–38 Kangaroo tour
11	25 October 1947	New Zealand def. Oldham 18–8	17,239	1947–48 New Zealand Kiwis tour
12	4 December 1948	Australia def. Oldham 27–7	14,798	1948–49 Kangaroo tour
13	29 September 1951	Oldham def. New Zealand 21–18	15,174	1951–52 New Zealand Kiwis tour
14	15 September 1952	Australia drew. Oldham 7–7	19,620	1952–53 Kangaroo tour
15	29 October 1955	New Zealand def. Oldham 15-13	14,700	1955–56 New Zealand Kiwis tour
16	7 November 1956	Oldham def. Australia 21–2	8,956	1956–57 Kangaroo tour
17	3 October 1959	Australia def. Oldham 25–14	17,621	1959–60 Kangaroo tour
18	4 September 1961	Oldham / Rochdale XIII def. New Zealand 10–8	8,795	1961 New Zealand Kiwis tour
19	5 October 1963	Australia def. Oldham 12–4	11,773	1963–64 Kangaroo tour
20	31 August 1965	New Zealand def. Oldham 5–2	10,333	1965 New Zealand Kiwis tour
21	11 November 1967	Australia def. Oldham 18-8	3,329	1967–68 Kangaroo tour
22	27 October 1971	New Zealand def. Oldham 24–13	1,872	1971 New Zealand Kiwis tour
23	19 October 1973	Australia def. Oldham 44–10	2,770	1973 Kangaroo tour
24	4 November 1975	Australia def. Oldham 20–10	3,675	1975 Australian Rugby League World Cup tour
25	4 November 1986	Australia def. Oldham 22–16	5,678	1986 Kangaroo tour
