= Swinton Lions =

English professional rugby league club

Club information
- Full name: Swinton Rugby League Football Club
- Nickname: Lions
- Short name: Swinton
- Colours: Blue and white
- Founded: 1866; 160 years ago
- Website: swintonlionsrlfc.co.uk

Current details
- Ground: Heywood Road (2016–) List of grounds
- CEO: Steve Wild
- Coach: Anthony Murray
- Captain: Gavin Rodden
- Competition: Championship
- 2026 season: 17th
- Current season

Uniforms
Home colours	Away colours

Records
- Premierships: 6 (1926–27, 1927–28, 1930–31, 1934–35, 1962–63, 1963–64)
- Challenge Cups: 3 (1899–1900, 1925–26, 1927–28)
- Lancashire County Cup: 4 (1925–26, 1927–28, 1939–40, 1969–70)
- Lancashire League: 6 (1924–25, 1927–28, 1928–29, 1930–31, 1939–40, 1960–61)
- Second Division: 1 (1984–85)
- Most capped: 14 – Martin Hodgson
- Highest points scorer: 2,095 – Ken Gowers

The Swinton Lions are a professional rugby league club based in Swinton, Greater Manchester, England, which competes in the RFL Championship. The club has won the Championship six times and three Challenge Cups. Before 1996, the club was known simply as Swinton RLFC.

== History ==
=== Early years ===
The club was formed in 1866 when members of Swinton Cricket Club decided to take up Rugby football in the winter to keep fit. Other than an annual challenge against the local Lancashire Rifle Volunteers from 1869, the only games played were amongst the club's own membership.

In 1871, they joined the Rugby Football Union as Swinton and Pendlebury F.C., playing their first game at Burying Lane against Eccles Standard. The team quickly became virtually unbeatable in the Manchester area and beyond. This rise in stature was surprising because Swinton and Pendlebury was a tiny colliery village with a few cotton mills, but it had a large number of local junior teams from which the club drew its talent.

In 1873, they moved from Burying Lane (Station Road from circa 1889) to a ground known as Stoneacre, and used the nearby White Lion public house as changing rooms. They have been known as the Lions ever since.

Having gone three years undefeated in the mid-1870s, the Lions gradually sought a tougher fixture list. In 1878, the club ventured into Yorkshire, and was soon travelling throughout England taking on opponents including Oxford University. Such was the Lions' success that by the mid-1880s Swinton had become recognised as a national force and were considered the strongest team in Lancashire. The first rugby match under floodlights took place in Salford, between Broughton and Swinton on 22 October 1878.

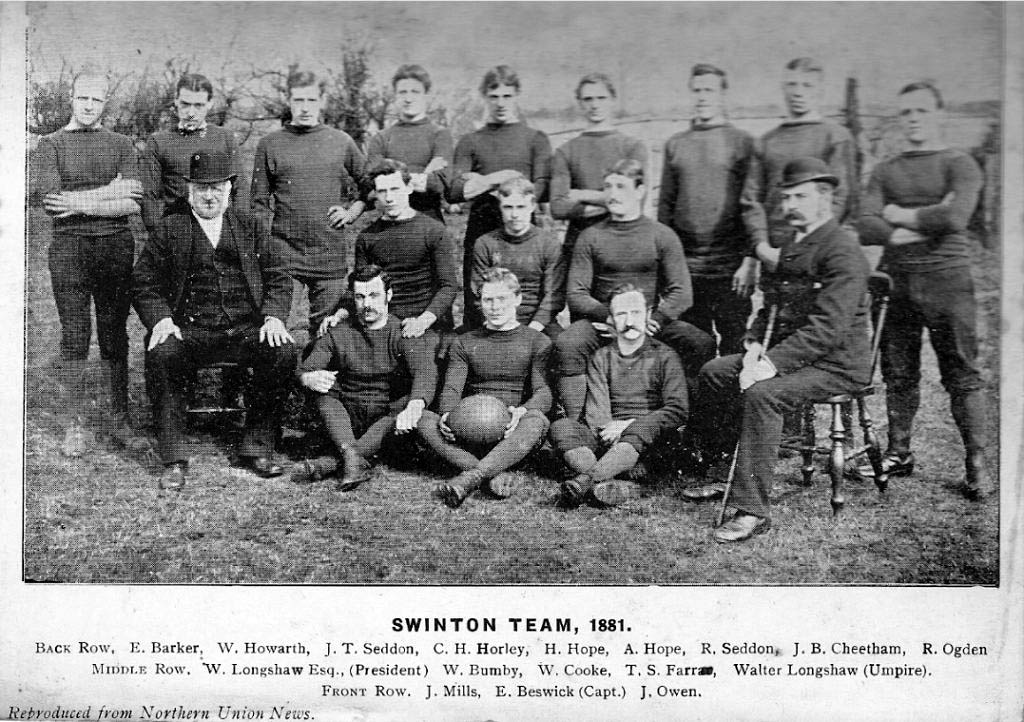
Swinton team of 1881

In 1886, they moved to Chorley Road. The new ground could accommodate much larger crowds and the staging of County matches added to Swinton's growing reputation. The Lions produced several England internationals and dozens more who gained representative recognition wearing the red rose of Lancashire.

They were initially reluctant to join the new Northern Union, but did so on 2 June 1896 due to the fact that the majority of other teams in the area had done so, causing financial hardship to the club. The Northern Union was then split into two county leagues, Lancashire and Yorkshire.

In 1900, led by Jim Valentine, they won the Rugby League Challenge Cup defeating Salford at Fallowfield, Manchester.

On Saturday 8 September 1906, Swinton hosted a Pontefract team who arrived with only 12 players. The Lions scored 18 tries in a club record 76–4 victory. This record would stand for ninety years but three months later when the Lions visited Pontefract they lost 5–0.

The period leading up to World War I was not particularly auspicious for the Lions. Financial crisis followed financial crisis and only the sale of the main stand saved the club from closure during 1917. The war took the lives of 13 Swinton players, but back home the Lions played on throughout in a desperate attempt to stay afloat.

=== Inter-war period ===
Lions' directors managed to call upon the support of local businessmen. The signings of Hector Halsall, a centre and future captain, and Albert Jenkins, a Welsh half-back, provided the catalyst. Throughout the 1920s the Lions got better and better, they beat the visiting Australasian team of the 1921–22 Kangaroo tour of Great Britain 9–0. At last they won the Lancashire County Cup in 1925 before recapturing the Challenge Cup in 1926.

They then followed this with their first-ever Championship a year later, and in 1928 the team reached its zenith becoming the last team to secure All Four Cups; they were also the only side from Lancashire to achieve this feat (Hunslet and Huddersfield were the two other clubs). In addition to the Championship Trophy, the Challenge Cup, the Lancashire League and the Lancashire Cup; Swinton won a fifth cup, the Salford Royal Hospital Cup, which was competed for by Salford, Broughton Rangers and Swinton. Crowds in excess of 20,000 were commonplace at Chorley Road.

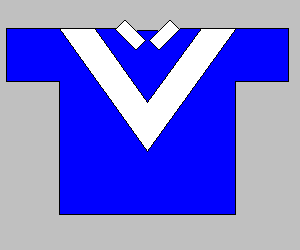
A traditional Swinton jersey design

Under captain, Hector Halsall, the Lions were a side with a strong Welsh presence, with players like Billo Rees as well as the Cumbrian goal-kicking second row forward, Martin Hodgson who signed for Swinton in January 1927. Hodgson still holds the long distance penalty goal world record with a kick of 77¾ yards (at the Athletic Grounds, Rochdale Hornets, in April 1940).

The 1927–28 season saw the Lions sweep all before them. They topped both the Championship and the Lancashire League, having already defeated Wigan in the Lancashire Cup. In a tense Challenge Cup Final they squeezed past Warrington 5–3, and three weeks later the Holy Grail was achieved when they comfortably eased past Featherstone Rovers 11–0 to take the Rugby Football League Championship.

A rent dispute in 1928 caused the club to search for pastures new. In 1929, the club then moved to a new stadium back near their original home off Station Road, taking the old stands with them. This new stadium's name was named after its location, Station Road. In March 1929, a 22,000 thousand crowd saw the Lions defeat Wigan in the first match on new turf. This soon became a favoured ground for major fixtures such as Test matches, Challenge Cup semi-finals, Lancashire Cup finals and Championship finals.

Further Championships were won in 1931 and 1935.

Swinton won the Lancashire Cup against Widnes in 1940, but thereafter the war curtailed the promise of further progress. In 1941–42, Swinton abandoned the Lancashire League due to the Second World War and did not return until the 1945–46 season.

=== Post-war ===
Throughout the late 1940s, and the 1950s the Lions strove unsuccessfully to repeat former glories and often flattered to deceive, but the appointment of Welshman Cliff Evans as coach signalled a renaissance. Concentrating on a youth policy and training methods beyond his era, Evans began to model an exciting, young Swinton team. This new era saw some notable Welshmen in the Lions' ranks such as Rees Thomas, Ralph Morgan, Frank Osmond, Dai Moses, Ron Morgan and Graham Rees. Also in the 'swinging 1960s' years the Lions fielded real top class performers such as GB internationals Ken Gowers at full-back, Alan Buckley at left-centre plus his wing partner, John Stopford. During this same decade, local talent came to the fore with the likes of Graham Williams (scrum-half), Derek Whitehead (full-back/utility), Barry Simpson (2nd-row) and classy GB loose-forward Dave Robinson. During the second half of the decade other prominent players turned out for the Lions. Of these, perhaps the most worthy were stand-off Billy 'Daz' Davies, scrum-half Peter Kenny and 2nd-rowers Rod Smith (ex-Workington Town) and the highly respected Bill Holliday (ex-Whitehaven, Hull Kingston Rovers, Cumberland and GB). In fact it was the Lions 1960s quartet of Gowers, Buckley, Stopford and Robinson who were selected to play for the GB tourists on the 1966 tour to Australasia. Gowers was even given the honour of being awarded the position of tour vice-captain. However, some critics saw this as an apology for overlooking him when the previous tourists were chosen in 1962, when many believe he was easily the most outstanding player to wear a full-back's jersey in the British game.

A proposal in 1960 to create a Manchester rugby league club at the former White City Stadium on Chester Road, Old Trafford, Stretford, received strong opposition from Salford and Swinton. Their protests were renewed when a match was staged there between a Manchester XIII (Salford and Swinton players) and the New Zealand tourists in September 1961 and the idea was subsequently dropped.

Swinton made it to the final of the Lancashire County Cup in three consecutive seasons 1960–61, 1961–62 and 1962–63 plus 1964–65 but lost to St. Helens on each occasion at Central Park, Wigan. However, by the end of the 1960s they finally lifted the trophy after overcoming a strong Leigh side 11–2 led by Alex Murphy. Their victorious captain that early November day in 1969 at Central Park, Wigan was long serving dependable right-centre Bob Fleet.

Swinton became Champions of the Rugby Football League Championship in the 1962–63 season. Led by coach Cliff Evans and inspirational skipper Albert Blan, the team recovered from a slow start to complete the final backlogged 18 games (delayed due to the severe winter weather) of a 30-match league calendar undefeated to walk away with the Championship. Swinton's 6th Championship was retained in style 12 months later (1963–64).

As Swinton coach in the late 1960s/early 1970s, Albert Blan guided the team to a fourth and final Lancashire County Cup success in the 1969–70 Final against Leigh by 11–2 at Central Park, Wigan.

When two divisions were reintroduced in 1973, Swinton were out of the top flight, and have struggled to regain their former glories ever since. By the end of the 1970s the club had hit rock-bottom, even though Station Road continued to host semi-finals and finals.

Initially under Frank Myler, and then under Jim Crellin, the Lions briefly threatened a revival during the 1980s. Players such as Les Holliday (son of Bill) and Danny Wilson offered great hope for the future, but despite a Second Division Premiership success in 1987, three separate promotions simply brought about three immediate relegations.

Swinton offered Leigh the option of a ground share at Station Road in June 1991 but they turned it down. In 1992, financial mismanagement necessitated the sale of Station Road for property development. The club moved to Gigg Lane, Bury, the home of Bury F.C. In the Lions' last season at Station Road they were drawing crowds of 3,000 but this sudden move caused the club to lose many supporters.

Swinton were saved from liquidation by a consortium headed by former chairman Malcolm White in January 1993.

=== 1996–2024: Summer era ===
In 1996, the first tier of British rugby league clubs played the inaugural Super League season and changed from a winter to a summer season. The rest of the professional game in Britain would follow this move to summer.

In 1996, Swinton officially added Lions to their name. Peter Roe led Swinton to promotion from Division Two in 1996. The former Great Britain captain, Mike Gregory was the head coach of the club between 1998 and 2001. The popular but ultimately disastrous reign of Tony Humphreys followed in the early period of 2002. Humphreys was sacked in late May 2002 and replaced by former player Phil Veivers. Under the guidance of Veivers performances and result improved significantly and the Lions finished in a promotional playoff position. Only a loss to Sheffield Eagles denied the Lions the opportunity of promotion to National League One.

The financial failure of major creditor and de facto owner Hugh Eaves in 2002 put the future of the club in jeopardy, the chairman and benefactor Malcolm White resigned. The Swinton Supporters' Trust began life on 14 February 2002 in the White Lion public house and set about raising funds for the club. Shortly afterwards, Swinton were forced out of Gigg Lane by the financial problems of their landlords, Bury F.C.

In August 2002, the club were brought the club back to within one mile of the Swinton and Pendlebury border when they played their first match at Moor Lane in Kersal as tenants of Salford City F.C., after travelling to Leigh and Chorley to play 'home' matches. Unfortunately the football club would not grant Swinton a ten-year lease which would be required to enable much needed funding to bring the ground up to standard.

In 2004, the Lions moved to Park Lane, Whitefield, home of Sedgley Park R.U.F.C.

Peter Roe quit as coach of Swinton Lions in September 2003, after less than a year in charge. He rejected a two-year contract to continue as the coach and general manager and left the National League Two club.

In 2006, the return to Swinton and Pendlebury was taken one step further when club chairman, John Kidd, announced on 9 August that the club had acquired a site to build a 6,000 capacity stadium with training facilities and community use in Agecroft, Pendlebury.

In May 2007, Swinton Lions went into administration for about 48 hours to restructure the club from top to bottom. A new company, Swinton Lions Rugby Club, was set up to remove problems with shareholdings from the previous administration. The club came under the stewardship of chairman, John Kidd and fellow directors Paul Kidd (chairman's son), Dave Roberts and Ben Jones.

In May 2009, John Kidd announced that he hoped to be in a position to apply for planning permission from the local council by the autumn. Once given approval by Salford Council it was envisaged that construction could be completed quickly.

During the autumn of 2009 director Paul Kidd stood down as head coach and moved to his new role as director of rugby. It was also announced that the new player/coach for season 2010 would be Paul Smith with Ian Watson as his assistant player/coach. During the season, on 25 May 2010, Paul Smith announced his resignation from his head coach role and left to play for Leigh. He was replaced by Paul Kidd and Ian Watson.

On 26 September 2010, former Barrow coach Steve McCormack was confirmed as the head coach for the 2011 season with Ian Watson and Marlon Billy continuing in their roles as assistant coaches. Swinton played their home games for the 2011 season at the Willows, Weaste, Salford. Swinton went on to win promotion to the Co-operative Championship as Champions of Championship 1.

As of 7 June 2011 when the club hosted a fans' meeting at Moorside Social Club, Swinton, Mr Kidd stated that he expected that the building of the stadium should commence no later than New Year's Day, 2012 with completion set for the end of April (2012). However, the predicted return date of spring 2012 proved to be a somewhat optimistic and premature forecast. Ultimately the funding did not materialise and the club later relinquished its lease on the Agecroft site.

With Salford moving to a new stadium in Barton, Eccles, Swinton set up a ground-share with Leigh in the Co-operative Championship for the 2012 season and onwards whilst they await permission to build their own ground at Agecroft.

On 18 March 2013 the club announced the appointment of Gary Chambers as head coach. Gary, a teacher at Harrop Fold School in Walkden. By late 2013 the club was found to be in severe financial difficulties. Chairman John Kidd announced his resignation and hopes of saving the club were left in the hands of director David Jones and the Supporters' Trust. Alan Marshall and Stephen Wild were nominated by the Supporters' Trust to fill two positions on the new board of directors. Ian Watson took over as player-coach.

In January 2014, Salford City Reds owner Marwan Koukash announced his intention to revolutionise Swinton town centre via the development of St Ambrose Barlow RC High School. His plans were to include a 3,000 capacity stadium for the Lions on the site of the old school playing field, alongside new housing, restaurants and a hotel.

In June 2014, Ian Watson left to join Salford and John Duffy replaced him as head coach in July. A difficult season combined with drastic restructuring of the league structure left the Lions in the third tier of rugby league, League 1, in 2015. In October 2014 the club announced its intention to return to Park Lane, home of Sedgley Park RUFC as its home base for season 2015.

Following their promotion from League 1 to the Championship in 2015, Swinton were forced to play their home league games in nearby Salford and Widnes as Park Lane (Sedgley Park RUFC) did not meet the minimum requirements for the Championship, before moving to Heywood Road, Sale. As of March 2016 the club has re-engaged with the project to establish a community stadium in the Agecroft district of Pendlebury.

In July 2017 after a very poor season on the field and serious financial problems off it, coach John Duffy departed and took a new coaching post with Featherstone Rovers after their man in charge, Jon Sharp left his post. He was immediately replaced by former player and assistant coach Stuart Littler.

On 5 September 2017 the club announced that former Leigh Director Andy Mazey owner of Greater Manchester-based S. R. Waite Group would step in as the new club chairman. Since Mazey's arrival the board now includes former Manchester United Brand Manager Tony Sheridan, former Wigan Athletic footballer John Coyne, and Tecmark Managing Director Richard Heyes.

In September 2019 the club announced that they were seeking permission from the Rugby Football League to rebrand the club as Manchester Lions from the 2020 season onwards. The official name of the club would remain Swinton Lions but the branding and presentation would all become Manchester. The plan was met with considerable opposition including local councillors and the Mayor of Salford. As a result of the opposition the re-brand plans were shelved and almost the entire board resigned on 12 September 2019, leaving sole remaining director Steve Wild in charge to re-structure the club. Since then a new board of directors has been assembled, which has subsequently taken ownership of the company.

In the 2021 Championship season, Swinton finished bottom of the table and were relegated after winning only two matches for the entire year. On 2 October 2022, Swinton achieved promotion from League 1 back to the championship after beating Doncaster 16–10 in the playoff final. In the 2023 RFL Championship season, Swinton finished 10th on the table. In the 2024 RFL Championship season, Swinton finished 12th on the table narrowly avoided direct relegation back to League 1. However, the club would be relegated following their promotion/relegation playoff loss to Hunslet.

== Home grounds ==
- Chorley Road (1896–1929)
- Station Road (1929–92)
- Gigg Lane (1992–2002)
- Park Lane (2003–2010)
- The Willows (2011)
- Leigh Sports Village (2012–15)
- Heywood Road (2016–)

== 2027 squad ==
2027 Swinton Lions Squad
First team squad			Coaching staff
(England) Dan Abram – FB, SH; (England) Luke Brighouse – WG, CE, FB; (England) Jordan Brown – PR; (England) Josh Eaves – HK; (England) Ryan Forshaw – SO, SH; (England) Jordy Gibson – SH; (England) Harry Higham – WG, CE; (England) Brad Holroyd – WG; (England) Jack Houghton – SR, PR; (England) Adam Jones – SR, CE, SO; (England) Layton Jupp – PR	(England) Dylan Kelly-Duffy – SR, PR; (England) Trent Kelly-Duffy – SR; (England) Ben Killan – PR, LF; (Ireland) Aaron Lynch – CE; (Ireland) Danny Lynch – PR; (England) Tom Marshall – LF; (England) Deane Meadows – SR, PR, LF; (England) Danté Morley-Samuels – CE, WG; (England) Sam Oakes – PR; (England) Connor Parkinson – CE, FB, WG; (England) Mike Porter – PR	(England) Tom Ratchford – SO, SH, HK; (England) Jamie Reddecliff – PR; (England) Lloyd Roby – FB, CE; (England) Gav Rodden (c) – SR, CE, LF; (England) Louie Roberts – FB; (England) Bobby Shingler – PR, LF; (England) Jack Stevens – SH, HK; (England) Aaron Willis – PR, SR	Head coach: Anthony Murray; Assistant coaches: Mickey Higham; Alan Hadcroft; Mike Grady; Legend: (c) Captain(s); (vc) Vice-captain(s); Updated: Source(s): https://swintonlionsrlfc.co.uk/24-25-squad/

== 2027 transfers ==
=== Gains ===
Player	From	Contract	Date
(England) Luke Brighouse	St Helens	1 year	14 September 2026
(England) Sam Oakes	St Helens	1 year	30 October 2026
(England) Ryan Forshaw	Thatto Heath Crusaders	1 year	14 September 2026
(Ireland) Danny Lynch	Salford	1 year	20 October 2026
(England) Dan Abram	Hunslet	1 year	26 October 2026
(England) Lloyd Roby	Halifax Panthers	1 year	27 October 2026
(England) Brad Holroyd	Keighley Cougars	1 year	27 October 2026
(England) Layton Jupp	Leigh Leopards	1 year	28 October 2026
(England) Jack Houghton	Widnes Vikings	1 year	29 October 2026
(England) Tom Marshall	Warrington Wolves	1 year	5 November 2026
(England) Mike Porter	Wigan Warriors	1 year	5 November 2026

=== Losses ===
Player	To	Contract	Date
(Samoa) Patrick Ah Van	New Brighton F.C. (rugby union)		10 September 2026
(Democratic Republic of the Congo) Samy Kibula	Rochdale Hornets	1 year	27 September 2026
(England) Ellis Anderson			28 September 2026
(England) Ethan Fitzgerald			28 September 2026
(England) Reece Briers			2 October 2026
(England) Charlie McCurrie	Workington Town	1 year	17 November 2026

=== Retired ===
Player	Date
(England) Finley Beardsworth	7 October 2026

== Players ==
=== Players earning international caps while at Swinton ===
- Charlie Armitt won caps for England while at Swinton 1949 Other Nationalities
- Tom Armitt won caps for England while at Swinton 1935 France, Wales, 1936 Wales (2 matches), France, 1937 France, 1938 Wales (2 matches), France, 1939 Wales, and won caps for Great Britain while at Swinton 1933 Australia, 1936 Australia (2 matches), New Zealand (2 matches), 1937 Australia (3 matches)
- "Ted"/"Teddy" Beswick won caps for England (RU) while at Swinton 2-caps
- Albert Blan won caps for England while at Swinton 1953
- Chris Brockbank won caps for England while at Swinton 1927 Wales
- Alan Buckley won caps for England while at Swinton 1968 Wales (sub), and won caps for Great Britain while at Swinton 1963 Australia, 1964 France, 1965 New Zealand, 1966 France, Australia (2 matches), New Zealand
- Brian Butler won caps for Wales while at Swinton in the 1975 Rugby League World Cup against France, New Zealand, and France (World Cup 1975 3-caps)
- Fred Butters won caps for England while at Swinton 1932 Wales, and won caps for Great Britain while at Swinton 1929–30 Australia (2 matches)
- Leo Casey won caps for Ireland while at Featherstone Rovers, and Swinton 1995–1997 5-caps
- Dai Davies won a cap for Wales while at Swinton? 1-cap
- Dan Davies won a cap for Wales while at Swinton 1910 1-cap, and won a cap for Other Nationalities while at Swinton? 1-cap
- David B. Davies won caps for Wales while at Merthyr Tydfil, Swinton, and Oldham 1908–1913 9-caps
- Billy "Daz" Davies won caps for England while at Swinton 1968 Wales, and won caps for Great Britain while at Swinton 1968 France
- Mike Edwards won a cap for Wales while at Swinton in 1996 against England 1-cap
- Bryn Evans won caps for England while at Swinton 1930 Other Nationalities, 1932 Wales (2 matches), 1933 Australia, and won caps for Great Britain while at Swinton 1926–27 New Zealand, 1928 New Zealand, 1929–30 Australia, 1932 Australia (2 matches), New Zealand (3 matches), 1933 Australia (2 matches)
- Frank Evans won a cap for Wales (RU) while at Llanelli RFC in 1921 against Scotland, won caps for Wales (RL) while at Swinton 7-caps, won caps for Other Nationalities (RL) while at Swinton in 1924 against England, in 1926 against England, and won caps for Great Britain while at Swinton in 1924 against Australia (2 matches), and New Zealand (2 matches)
- Jack Evans won caps for England while at Swinton 1925 Wales (2 matches), 1926 Wales, Other Nationalities, 1928 Wales, and won caps for Great Britain while at Swinton 1926–27 New Zealand (3 matches)
- Dick Evans won caps for Wales while at Swinton in the 1975 Rugby League World Cup against France (2 matches) (World Cup 1975 2-caps)
- Richie Eyres won caps for Wales while at Leeds, and Swinton 1995–1999 7(8, 9?)-caps + 1-cap (sub)
- Ken Gowers won caps for England while at Swinton 1962 France, and won caps for Great Britain while at Swinton 1962 France, 1963 France, Australia (3 matches), 1964 France (2 matches), 1965 New Zealand (2 matches), 1966 France (2 matches), Australia, New Zealand (2 matches)
- Hector Halsall won a cap for Great Britain while at Swinton 1-cap
- Gordon Haynes won caps for Great Britain while at Swinton 1-(unofficial?)cap
- Martin Hodgson won caps for England while at Swinton 1928 Wales, 1929 Other Nationalities, 1932 Wales, 1935 France, 1936 Wales (2 matches), France, 1937 France, and won caps for Great Britain while at Swinton 1929–30 Australia (2 matches), 1932 Australia (3 matches), New Zealand (3 matches), 1933 Australia (3 matches), 1936 Australia (3 matches), New Zealand, 1937 Australia
- Charlie Horley won a cap for England (RU) while at Swinton 1-cap
- Gomer Hughes won caps for Wales while at Swinton 3-caps
- Bob Jones represented Wales XV (RU) while at Aberavon RFC in the 'Victory International' non-Test match(es) between December 1945 and April 1946, and won caps for Wales (RL) while at Swinton, and St. Helens 1947–1949 3-caps
- Paul Kennett won caps for Wales while at Swinton 1992 2-caps + 1-cap (sub)
- Jack Kenny won caps for England while at Swinton 1936 Wales
- Simon Knox won caps for Scotland while at Swinton 2-caps
- James Marsh won a cap for England (RU) while at Swinton 1-cap
- D. Ralph Morgan won caps and was captain for Wales while at Swinton 1949–50 3-caps
- Ron Morgan won caps for Wales while at Swinton 1970 England, and won caps for Great Britain while at Swinton 1963 France, Australia, 1968 France, New Zealand
- Chris Morley won caps for Wales while at St. Helens in 1996 against France (sub), and England, while at Salford in 1999 against Ireland, and Scotland, while at Sheffield Eagles in 2000 against South Africa (sub), while at Leigh in the 2000 Rugby League World Cup against Lebanon (sub), New Zealand, Papua New Guinea (sub), and Australia, while at Oldham in 2001 against England, while at Halifax in 2003 against Russia, and Australia, while at Swinton in 2006 against Scotland, 1996–2006 13(14?)-caps + 4-caps (sub) 1(2?)-try 4(8?)-points
- Dai Moses won a cap for Wales while at Swinton in 1959 against France at Stade des Minimes, Toulouse on Sunday 1 March 1959
- Peter Norburn won caps for England while at Swinton 1953 Other Nationalities
- Frank Osmond represented Great Britain while at Swinton in non-Test matches on the 1950 tour of Australasia, and won caps for Wales while at Swinton 1948–1951 14-caps
- Owen Phillips won caps for Wales while at Swinton 1951–1953 6-caps
- Billo Rees won caps for Wales while at Swinton in 1926–1930 6-caps, and won caps for Great Britain while at Swinton 1926 New Zealand, 1927 New Zealand, 1928 Australia (3 matches), New Zealand (3 matches), 1929 Australia (2 matches), 1930 Australia
- Jason Roach won caps for Scotland while at Swinton 2-caps
- Samuel "Sam" Roberts won caps for England (RU) while at Swinton 2-caps
- Dave Robinson won caps for England while at Swinton 1969 Wales, and won caps for Great Britain while at Swinton 1965 New Zealand, 1966 France (2 matches), Australia (3 matches), New Zealand (2 matches), 1967 France (2 matches), Australia (2 matches), Wigan 1970 Australia
- John Stopford won caps for Great Britain while at Swinton 12-caps
- Kris Tassell won caps for Wales while at Salford, Wakefield Trinity and unattached 2000–2004 11(10?)-caps 6-tries 24-points
- Rees Thomas won caps for Wales while at Swinton 1-(unofficial?)cap
- Jim Valentine won caps for England (RU) while at Swinton 4-caps
- Ian Watson won caps for Wales while at Salford, Swinton, Widnes, Rochdale Hornets, Oldham and Leigh 1996–present 19(17?)-caps + 3-caps (sub) 3(4?)-tries 1-goal 14(18?)-points
- Danny Wilson won caps for Wales while at Swinton 1981–1984 4 (5?)-caps 1-try 1-goal 2-drop-goal 8-points
- Joe Wright won caps for England while at Swinton 1932 Wales, 1933 Other Nationalities, 1934 France, and won caps for Great Britain while at Swinton 1932 New Zealand

=== Other notable players ===
- Owen Badger
- Tom Banks 1888 British Isles tourist (RU)
- Mark Bourneville
- Walter Bumby 1888 British Isles tourist (RU)
- Russell Burn from Cardiff RFC 1950
- Andy Coley
- Lawrence Critch Scrum-half 1901–1906
- Philip Cushion
- Kelvin Earl
- Morvin Edwards
- Jack Evans
- Karl Fitzpatrick
- "Richie" Hawkyard
- Rees Thomas
- Arthur Hickman
- Les Holliday
- Graham Holroyd
- Chico Hopkins
- Bill Hopkin
- Dave Hull
- Gary Hulse
- Robert Irving
- Jordan James
- Mark Lee
- Talite Liava'a
- Davide Longo
- Paul Loughlin
- Alex Melling (Testimonial match 1994)
- Martin Moana
- Tony Morrison (to Castleford 1992)
- Mick Nanyn
- Arthur George Paul 1888 British Isles tourist (RU)
- "Jack" Preston 1900 Challenge Cup Winner
- Gavin Price-Jones
- Graham Rees
- Ken Roberts
- Robert Seddon
- Mark Sheals
- Barry Simpson
- Steve Snape
- Paul Southern
- Bob Valentine
- Mike Wainwright
- John Walker
- Joe Warham
- David Watkins
- Mark Welsby (from Wigan 1992)
- Derek Whitehead
- Graham Williams
- William Williams Wing
- Willie Wolfgramm

== Coaches ==
- Sam Jones 1945
- Albert Jenkins 1945–1951
- Griff Jenkins 1951–1954
- Cliff Evans 1954–1967
- Dai Moses 1967–1968
- Albert Blan 1968–1971
- David Mortimer 1971–1972
- Rees Thomas 1972–1974
- Austin Rhodes 1974–1975
- Bobby Fleet 1975–1976
- Johnny Stopford 1976–1977
- Bobby Fleet 1977
- Terry Gorman 1977–1978
- Ken Halliwell 1978–1979
- Bobby Fleet 1979
- Stan Gittins 1979–1980
- Alan Ratcliffe 1981–1988
- Frank Myler 1980–1981
- Tom Grainey 1981–1983
- Jim Crellin 1983–1986
- Bill Holliday & Mike Peers 1986–1987
- Peter Smethurst 1987–1988
- Frank Barrow 1988–1989
- Jim Crellin 1989–1991
- Chris O'Sullivan 1991
- Tony Barrow 1992–1996
- Peter Roe 1996–1997
- Les Holliday 1997–1999
- Mike Gregory 1999–2001
- Tony Humphries 2001–2002
- Tony Barrow 2002
- Phil Veivers 2002
- Peter Roe 2003
- Paul Kidd 2004–2009
- Paul Smith 2010
- Paul Kidd 2010
- Steve McCormack 2011–2012
- Gary Chambers 2013
- Ian Watson 2014
- John Duffy 2014–2017
- Stuart Littler 2017–21
- Allan Coleman 2021–23
- Alan Kilshaw 2024
- Paul Wood 2025-26
- Anthony Murray (2026-present)

== Seasons ==
=== Summer era ===
Season	League									Play-offs	Challenge Cup	Other competitions		Name	Tries	Name	Points
Season	Division	P	W	D	L	F	A	Pts	Pos	Play-offs	Challenge Cup	Other competitions		Top try scorer		Top point scorer	
1996	Division Two	22	18	0	4	785	295	36	2nd		R4						
1997	Division One	20	7	0	13	355	488	14	9th		R4						
1998	Division One	30	17	1	12	702	544	35	5th	Lost in Elimination Playoffs	R5						
1999	Northern Ford Premiership	28	10	0	18	645	641	20	13th		R4						
2000	Northern Ford Premiership	28	13	2	13	726	733	28	9th		R4						
2001	Northern Ford Premiership	28	10	0	18	538	711	20	15th		R4						
2002	Northern Ford Premiership	27	6	1	20	473	918	13	15th		R4						
2003	National League Two	18	8	1	9	445	426	17	7th		QF						
2004	National League Two	18	12	0	6	547	460	24	4th	Lost in Elimination Final	R3						
2005	National League Two	18	11	0	7	623	434	22	4th	Lost in semi-final	R4						
2006	National League Two	22	13	1	8	641	475	27	7th	Lost in preliminary final	R4						
2007	National League Two	22	11	0	11	605	649	33	7th	Lost in Elimination Playoffs	R4						
2008	National League Two	22	6	0	16	482	777	22	10th		R4						
2009	Championship 1	18	8	0	10	513	516	27	7th	Lost in Elimination Playoffs	R4						
2010	Championship 1	20	9	1	10	570	581	33	8th		R5						
2011	Championship 1	20	14	1	5	720	479	47	1st	Promoted as Champions	R5						
2012	Championship	18	4	1	13	366	632	19	8th		R5						
2013	Championship	26	9	0	17	516	738	7	10th		R3						
2014	Championship	26	5	0	21	570	865	24	13th		R5						
2015	Championship 1	22	16	5	1	899	402	33	3rd	Won in Promotion Final	R5	League 1 Cup	RU				
2016	Championship	23	7	1	15	449	813	15	9th		R4						
2016	Championship Shield	30	10	1	19	596	1001	21	5th		R4						
2017	Championship	23	6	0	17	477	648	12	10th		R6						
2017	Championship Shield	30	8	0	22	629	862	16	6th		R6						
2018	Championship	23	3	2	18	402	866	8	11th	Won in Relegation Playoff	R4						
2018	Championship Shield	30	4	2	24	502	1112	10	8th	Won in Relegation Playoff	R4						
2019	Championship	27	10	1	16	619	803	21	9th		R4	1895 Cup	R2				
2020	Championship (Note: The 2020 Championship was abandoned due to the COVID-19 pandemic in the United Kingdom. Statistics shown are those at time of abandonment and are not official.)	3	2	0	2	48	55	2	10th		R5						
2021	Championship	21	2	1	18	308	748	5	13th		R6 (Note: Officially round 3 due to the competitions temporary restructure in 2021.)	1895 Cup	SF				
2022	League 1	20	16	0	4	834	317	32	2nd	Won in Promotion Final	R3						
2023	Championship	27	9	0	18	426	739	18	10th		R3						
2024	Championship	26	9	0	17	466	678	18	12th		R3	1895 Cup	GS				
2025	League One	18	12	0	6	385	328	24	3rd (Note: Promotion due to the merging League One and the Championship)	Play-offs cancelled	R2	1895 Cup	PR				
2026	Championship	24	6	1	17	488	794	13	17th		R3	1895 Cup	PR				

== Honours ==
- Rugby Football League Championship: 6
  - 1926–27, 1927–28, 1930–31, 1934–35 (also Match of Champions), 1962–63, 1963–64
- Challenge Cup: 3
  - 1899–1900, 1925–26, 1927–28
- Lancashire County Cup: 4
  - 1925–26, 1927–28, 1939–40, 1969–70
- Lancashire League: 5
  - 1924–25, 1927–28, 1928–29, 1930–31, 1960–61
- Second Division Championship: 1
  - 1984–85
- Second Division Premiership: 1
  - 1986–87
- RFL League 1: 1
  - 2011

== Records ==
=== Player records ===
- Most tries in a match: 6 by Mark Riley vs Prescot Panthers, 11 August 1996
- Most goals in a match: 15 by Dan Abram vs West Wales, 13 August 2022
- Most points in a match: 38 by Dan Abram vs West Wales, 13 August 2022
- Most tries in a season: 48 by Jim Valentine, 1888–89, (2nd most tries in a season, John Stopford, 42, season 1963–64)
- Most goals in a season: 128 by Albert Blan, 1960–61
- Most points in a season: 338 by Ian Mort, 2011
- Most career tries: 301 by Jim Valentine, 1884–1901
- Most career goals: 970 by Ken Gowers
- Most career points: 2,105 by Ken Gowers
- Most career appearances: 602 (including 8 as substitute) by Ken Gowers, 1954–1973.
- World record distance for a penalty goal, 77¾ yards by Martin Hodgson, Rochdale Hornets v Swinton, at the Athletic Grounds, Rochdale, 13 April 1940

=== Team records ===
- Biggest victory: 96–0 vs LLaneli, 30 January 2021
- Heaviest defeat: 0–112 vs Warrington Wolves, 20 May 2011
- Highest attendance:
  - Club: 26,891 vs Wigan, RL Challenge Cup 1st round replay, Wednesday, 12 February 1964 (Swinton defeated Wigan 13–8 at Station Road)
  - Station Road: 44,621 for Challenge Cup semi-final Warrington vs Wigan, 7 April 1951
  - vs International touring team: 13,341 vs Australia, 4 November 1933 (1933–34 Kangaroo Tour. Swinton defeated Australia 10–4 at Station Road)

== Women's team ==
In 2020, Swinton established a women's team known as the Lionesses. Initially the open age team played friendlies/Merit League matches with an under-16s team competing in U16s Division 1 West. In the 2022 season, Swinton Lionesses competed in League 1 where they finished second in the table before losing to Illingworth in the play-off semi-finals. The moved up to the RFL Women's Championship for the 2023 season before the restructuring of the league system saw them go back to League 1. They returned to the Championship in the 2025 season. In May 2025, Swinton won the Challenge Shield, by defeating Salford Red Devils 12–4 in the final. In July 2025, Swinton made their début at the RFL Women's Nines where they reached the semi-finals of the main competition.

In November 2025, the team was renamed as the Manchester Swinton Lionesses. In May 2026, the Lionesses were runners-up in the Challenge Grade competition at the Women's Nines. In July 2026, they won the Challenge Shield by defeating Warrington Wolves 18–10 in the final. In the 2026 National Championship, the Lionesses finished as league leaders but lost 28–10 to London Broncos in the Grand Final.
