= Lancashire rugby league team =

English representative rugby league team

Team information
- Governing body: Rugby Football League

Team results
- First game
- Cheshire 0–6 Lancashire (Edgeley Park, Stockport; 21 October 1895)
- First international
- Lancashire 20–4 New Zealand (Watersheddings, Oldham; 18 January 1908)
- Biggest win
- Durham and Northumberland (Durham, England) 0–42 Lancashire (Horsley Hill, South Shields; 9 December 1903)
- Biggest defeat
- Lancashire 7–33 Australia (Wilderspool Stadium, Warrington; 20 September 1933)

The Lancashire rugby league team is an English representative rugby league team consisting of players who were born in the historic county of Lancashire or who first played for a club in Lancashire.

== Rivalry ==
Until 2003, Lancashire played Yorkshire in the annual War of the Roses game. This match was part of the County Championship until 1983 when the competition stopped and Roses went on to become a stand-alone event.

== Results ==
Lancashire played in the County Championship from its inception in 1895 to its final season in 1983. They have also played against international representative sides during tours to Great Britain.

=== County Championship Results ===
Titles 34: 1895–1896, 1896–1897, 1899–1900, 1900–1901, 1902–1903, 1903–1904, 1905–1906, 1906–1907, 1908–1909, 1910–1911, 1922–1923, 1923–1924, 1924–1925, 1925–1926, 1926–1927, 1928–1929, 1929–1930, 1931–1932, 1935–1936, 1936–1937, 1937–1938, 1938–1939, 1945–1946, 1947–1948, 1952–1953, 1955–1956, 1956–1957, 1960–1961, 1967–1968, 1969–1970, 1973–1974, 1974–1975, 1978–1979, 1979–1980.

=== War of the Roses ===
Titles 44

=== International Results ===
Date	Opposition	Result	Venue	Attendance	Tour
18 January 1908	New Zealand	20–4	Watersheddings, Oldham	6,500	1907–08 All Golds tour
25 November 1908	Australia	6–20	Central Park, Wigan	4,000	1908–09 Kangaroo tour
8 March 1909	Australia	19–14	Wheater's Field, Broughton	4,000	1908–09 Kangaroo tour
2 October 1911	(Australia) (New Zealand) Australasia	12–25	Ewood Park, Blackburn	5,000	1911–12 Kangaroo tour
30 November 1921	(Australia) (New Zealand) Australasia	6–29	Goodison Park, Everton	17,000	1921–22 Kangaroo tour
14 December 1921	(Australia) (New Zealand) Australasia	8–6	Wilderspool, Warrington	6,000	1921–22 Kangaroo tour
3 January 1927	New Zealand	28–3	Leigh	7,000	1926–27 Kiwis tour
26 September 1929	Australia	14–26	Wilderspool, Warrington	24,000	1929–30 Kangaroo tour
20 September 1933	Australia	7–33	Wilderspool, Warrington	16,576	1933–34 Kangaroo tour
29 September 1937	Australia	7–5	Wilderspool, Warrington	16,250	1937–38 Kangaroo tour
11 October 1939	New Zealand	C–C	Wilderspool, Warrington	N/A	1939 Kiwis tour
8 December 1948	Australia	13–8	Central Park, Wigan	11,788	1948–49 Kangaroo tour
22 November 1951	New Zealand	13–12	Warrington	7,000	1951 Kiwis tour
30 November 1952	Australia	11–36	Wilderspool, Warrington	5,863	1952–53 Kangaroo tour
12 October 1955	New Zealand	15–17	Station Road, Swinton	6,859	1955 Kiwis tour
23 September 1959	Australia	30–22	Knowsley Road, St. Helens	15,743	1959–60 Kangaroo tour
13 September 1961	New Zealand	15–13	Wilderspool, Warrington	9,332	1961 Kiwis tour
25 September 1963	Australia	13–11	Central Park, Wigan	15,068	1963–64 Kangaroo tour
30 November 1967	Australia	2–14	The Willows, Salford	9,369	1967–68 Kangaroo tour
14 October 1987	Papua New Guinea	22–22	Knowsley Road, St Helens	4,202	1987 Kumuls tour

== NCL team ==
In 2010, an amateur Lancashire representative team, selected from the National Conference League (tier 4 of the British rugby league system), played a friendly against Malta.

Date	Opposition	Result	Venue
17 October 2010	Malta	62–0	Victor Tedesco Stadium, Ħamrun, Malta

== Women's team ==
The Lancashire women's teams was set up in 2014 for a pilot Origin competition with the aim to help develop the England women's national rugby league team. The pilot was deemed a success, and saw the team return for 2015 played as an annual fixture until 2020. In 2024, the origin fixture returned and formed part of the England selection process.

=== Current Team ===
For 2024

Emily Baggaley (St Helens), Grace Banks (Wigan Warriors), Leah Burke (St Helens), Mary Coleman (Wigan Warriors), Jodie Cunningham (St Helens), Anna Davies, Eva Hunter, Molly Jones (all Wigan Warriors), Zoe Harris, Tara Jones, Katie Mottershead (all St Helens), Eboni Partington (York Valkyrie), Isabel Rowe (Wigan Warriors), Emily Rudge, Lucy Sams, Beri Salihi, Erin Stott, Georgia Sutherland (all St Helens), Tara Jane Stanley (York Valkyrie), Amy Taylor, Paige Travis, Megan Williams, Vicky Whitfield (all St Helens).

=== Results ===
==== Women's Origin ====
Titles 5: 2014, 2015 (shared), 2016, 2018, 2020
