= 1936 Great Britain Lions tour =

- Manager: W. Poppleton and R.F. Anderton
- Tour captain(s): Jim Brough
Summary
P	W	D	L
Total
25	22	0	3
Test match
5	4	0	1
Opponent
P	W	D	L
Australia
3	2	0	1
New Zealand
2	2	0	0

Tour chronology
- Previous tour: 1932
- Next tour: 1946

The 1936 Great Britain Lions tour was a tour by the Great Britain national rugby league team of Australia and New Zealand which took place between May and August 1936. The tour involved a schedule of 24 games, 16 in Australia including a three-test series against Australia for the Ashes and a further 8 in New Zealand including a two-test series against New Zealand.

Captained by Jim Brough the Lions returned home having won 21 and lost 3 of their games. They won the Ashes against Australia 2–1 and made a clean sweep against New Zealand winning both test matches.

Despite being a British team the team played as, and were universally referred to by both the press at home and away, as England.

== Squad ==
A 26-man squad was selected for the tour with the names announced in March 1936 with Jim Sullivan named as captain. Two weeks after the squad was named, Sullivan withdrew from the squad due to the illness of his wife, the Rugby Football League (RFL) made Leeds fullback Jim Brough captain, moved Billy Belshaw from the centres to fullback and called up Wigan's Gwyn Davies to the vacancy in the centres. The squad that assembled in April 1936 comprised:

Backs
Name	Club
Fullbacks
Jim Brough	Leeds
Billy Belshaw	Liverpool Stanley
Threequarters
Right wings
Jack Morley	Wigan
Barney Hudson	Salford
Left wings
Stanley Smith	Leeds
Alan Edwards	Salford
Centres
Arthur Atkinson	Castleford
Fred Harris	Leeds
Gwyn Davies	Wigan
Gus Risman	Salford
Half-backs
Stand-offs
Emlyn Jenkins	Salford
Stan Brogden	Huddersfield
Scrum-halfs
Billy Watkins	Salford
Tommy McCue	Widnes

Forwards
Name	Club
Front row
Hookers
Tommy Armitt	Swinton
Harry Field	York
Props
Nat Silcock	Widnes
Harry Woods	Liverpool Stanley
Jack Miller	Warrington
Hal Jones	Keighley
Back row
Second-rows
Jack Arkwright	Warrington
Alec Troup	Barrow
Martin Hodgson	Swinton
Mick Exley	Wakefield Trinity
Loose forwards
Harry Beverley	Hunslet
Harold Ellerington	Hull F.C.

The two team managers were W. Poppleton of Bramley and R.F. Anderton of Warrington.

== Schedule and results ==
The majority of the team sailed from Tilbury on 17 April 1936 on board the SS Cathay with the Leeds and Warrington players together with Hunslet's Harry Beverley departing by train on 24 May to meet the rest of the team at Marseilles. The split departure was due to the players being involved in the Challenge Cup final on 18 April and in Beverley's case due to a family illness. The team arrived in Melbourne on 25 May and travelled to Sydney by train the following day.

Date	Opponents	Venue	Score (GB first)	Attendance	Notes
30 May	Sydney Firsts	Sydney Cricket Ground	Won 15–3	52,984	
3 June	Southern Districts	The Showground, Leeton	Won 35–13	6,000	Southern Districts was a representative team for teams playing in New South Wales Country Rugby League group 20.
6 June	New South Wales	Sydney Cricket Ground	Lost 14–18	49,519	
10 June	Western Districts	Spicer Park, Parkes	Won 33–16	7,000	This Western Districts side was the representative team for teams playing in New South Wales Country Rugby League group 11.
13 June	Queensland	Brisbane Cricket Ground	Won 35–13	24,722	
15 June	Wide Bay	Maryborough, Queensland	Won 35–8	4,000	Wide Bay was a representative team drawn from clubs in the Wide Bay division of the Queensland Rugby League.
17 June	Mackay	The Show Grounds, Mackay	Won 40–17	5,000	
20 June	North Queensland	Townsville	Won 39–3	8,000	North Queensland was the representative team for teams in the Queensland Rugby League Northern Division
23 June	Central Queensland	Rockhampton	Postponed and not re-arranged		A game was scheduled against the representative team of the Queensland Rugby League Central Division but was postponed due to flooding. The English team managers had been considering requesting postponement of the game due to the number of injuries the squad has suffered in the preceding games.
27 June	Newcastle	Newcastle	Lost 21–16	10,000	Newcastle was the representative team for teams in the Newcastle Rugby League. This was the first victory by a representative side from the New South Wales Country Rugby League over England.
29 June	Australia	Sydney Cricket Ground	Lost 24–8	69,320	First Ashes Test.
1 July	Ipswich	Ipswich	Won 23–3	3,000	
4 July	Australia	Brisbane Cricket Ground	Won 12–7	29,486	Second Ashes Test
8 July	Toowoomba	Toowoomba	Won 10–8	10,000	
11 July	Brisbane Firsts	Brisbane Cricket Ground	Won 35–13	10,374	
15 July	Northern Districts	Armidale	Won 19–15	6,980	Northern Districts was the representative team for clubs in Group 19 of the New South Wales Country Rugby League. During the match England forward, Jack Arkwright, was sent off twice. After the first sending off, the opposing captain, J Kingston, appealed to the referee for Arkwright to continue to play. The referee rescinded the sending off but towards the end of the game dismissed Arkwright again for punching an opponent.
18 July	Australia	Sydney Cricket Ground	Won 12–7	53,546	Third Ashes Test.
20 July	Western Districts	Lithgow	Won 36–14	6,000	This Western Districts team was the representative team for clubs in Group 10 of the New South Wales Country Rugby League
25 July	Auckland	Carlaw Park, Auckland	Won 22–16	26,000	
28 July	Wellington	Basin Reserve, Wellington	Won 48–8		
1 August	South Island	The Show Grounds, Addington	Won 17–3		
4 August	Taranaki	Pukekura Park, New Plymouth	Won 35–4	3,000	
6 August	South Auckland	Huntly	Won 21–6		
8 August	New Zealand	Carlaw Park, Auckland	Won 10–8	25,000	First Test
13 August	Northland	Jubilee Park, Whangārei	Won 34–0	4,000	
15 August	New Zealand	Carlaw Park, Auckland	Won 23–11	17,000	Second Test

Following the conclusion of the tour, the squad returned home sailing from Auckland on 18 August aboard the SS Akaroa and arriving in Southampton on 17 September 1936.

== Ashes series ==
=== Test venues ===
The three Ashes series tests took place at the following venues.

Sydney	Brisbane
Sydney Cricket Ground	Brisbane Cricket Ground
Capacity: 70,000	Capacity: 40,000

=== First test ===
29 June 1936
3:00 pm AEDT

Australia	24 – 8	(United Kingdom) England
Tries: Dave Brown (2); Joe Pearce; Alan Ridley; Goals: Dave Brown (4); Jack Beaton (2)		Tries: Harry Beverley (2); Goals: Martin Hodgson

Sydney Cricket Ground, Sydney
Attendance: 63,920
Referee: Lal Deane

Australia	Position	England
13. Jack Beaton	FB	2. Billy Belshaw
9. Arch Crippin	WG	5. Alan Edwards
8. Vic Hey	CE	12. Stan Brogden
10. David Brown (c)	CE	3. Arthur Atkinson (c)
12. Alan Ridley	WG	7. Jack Morley
11. Ernie Norman	FE/SO	11. Emlyn Jenkins
15. Viv Thicknesse	HB/SH	14. Tommy McCue
1. Ray Stehr	PR	17. Nat Silcock
2. Percy Fairall	HK	20. Harry Field
3. Frank Curran	PR	19. Jack Miller
5. Joe Pearce	SR	23. Martin Hodgson
4. Les Heidke	SR	18. Harry Woods
6. Wally Prigg	LK/LF	25. Harry Beverley

The first Ashes test was played at the Sydney Cricket Ground on 29 June 1936. Interest in the game was so high that within half an hour of the gates opening at 9 am the ground was full despite kick-off not being until 3 pm.

Prior to the kick-off the newly instituted Courtney Goodwill Trophy was presented to Henry Flegg of the Australian Rugby League Board of Control by Ernest Farrar on behalf of the trophy donor, Roy Courtney.

Injury to England captain, Jim Brough, meant a re-organisation for the England team with Billy Belshaw playing at full-back and Arthur Atkinson captaining the side. After Australian captain, David Brown scored an early penalty it was England who scored the first try when Harry Beverley scored from a scrum close to the Australian line. With the resulting conversion attempt missed England led 3–2. The lead was not to last long as Brown kicked another penalty soon after to give Australia a 4–3 advantage. These were the only scores of the first half but before half-time props Nat Silcock (England) and Ray Stehr (Australia) were sent off for fighting during a scrum.

The second half was all Australia's as they scored four converted tries through Brown with two and one each for Joe Pearce and Alan Ridley to lead 24–3 before Beverley scored a consolation try for England just before the end which Martin Hodgson converted.

=== Second test ===
4 July 1936
3:00 pm AEDT

Australia	7 – 12	(United Kingdom) England
Tries: Arch Crippin; Goals: Dave Brown; Jack Beaton		Tries: Alan Edwards (2); Goals: Gus Risman (2); Martin Hodgson

Brisbane Cricket Ground, Brisbane
Attendance: 29,486
Referee: Fred Moynihan

Australia	Position	England
Jack Beaton	FB	Jim Brough (c)
Arch Crippin	WG	Alan Edwards
Vic Hey	CE	Billy Belshaw
David Brown (c)	CE	Gus Risman
Alan Ridley	WG	Stan Brogden
Ernie Norman	FE/SO	Emlyn Jenkins
Viv Thicknesse	HB/SH	Billy Watkins
Ray Stehr	PR	Nat Silcock
Percy Fairall	HK	Tommy Armitt
Frank Curran	PR	Harry Woods
Joe Pearce	SR	Martin Hodgson
Les Heidke	SR	Jack Arkwright
Wally Prigg	LK/LF	Harry Beverley

The second test was played in Brisbane a week after the first test. An unchanged Australian side were looking for a first Ashes series win since 1920. England made several changes with Brough returning as captain at fullback with Belshaw returning to the centres in place of the injured Atkinson alongside Gus Risman as Brogden moved out to the wing in place of Morley. Watkins replaced McCue at scrum-half while in the forwards Arkwright and Armitt replaced Miller and Field.

On a pitch that was heavy after a lot of rain, England made the better start winning more possession from the scrum than the Australians and this pressure led to the first try when Alan Edwards scored in the corner. A Gus Risman penalty increased England's lead to 5–0 before Australia drew level with a try from winger Arch Crippin. Retrieving a dropped England pass on his own 25 yards (23 m) line Crippin ran the length of the pitch beating fullback Brough to score under the posts, leaving a simple conversation for Jack Beaton to level the scores.

In the second half, Edwards scored a second try for England form a scrum in much the same fashion as his first try and a successful conversion by Risman gave England a 10–5 lead which Australia reduced to a three-point lead when David Brown kicked a goal. The final points of the game came from Martin Hodgson as he kicked a penalty resulting from offside close to the Australian line.

=== Third test ===
18 July 1936
3:00 pm AEDT

Australia	7 – 12	(United Kingdom) England
Tries: Vic Hey; Goals: Dave Brown (2)		Tries: Stan Brogden; Barney Hudson; Goals: Martin Hodgson (3)

Sydney Cricket Ground, Sydney
Attendance: 53,546
Referee: Lal Deane

Australia	Position	England
13. Jack Beaton	FB	2. Billy Belshaw
9. Arch Crippin	WG	6. Alan Edwards
11. Ernie Norman	CE	12. Stan Brogden
10. David Brown (c)	CE	9. Gus Risman (c)
12. Alan Ridley	WG	4. Barney Hudson
8. Vic Hey	FE/SO	11. Emlyn Jenkins
7. Fred Gilbert	HB/SH	13. Billy Watkins
1. Ray Stehr	PR	17. Nat Silcock
2. Peter Madsen	HK	16. Tommy Armitt
3. Frank Curran	PR	22. Jack Arkwright
5. Joe Pearce	SR	23. Martin Hodgson
4. Les Heidke	SR	18. Harry Woods
6. Wally Prigg	LK/LF	25. Harry Beverley

The deciding test in the series was played at the Sydney Cricket Ground of 18 July 1936. England made only one change from the side that won the second test with Belshaw replacing Brough, who was injured, as fullback and bringing Barney Hudson into the centres. In the absences of Brough, Gus Risman captained the side for the first time. Australia made two changes, giving a debut to half-back Fred Gilbert and recalling Peter Madsen three years after his previous international appearance. Madsen was played at hooker, not his normal position - all his previous caps were at prop-forward - a decision later criticised in the Australian press.

Australia scored first with David Brown kicking a penalty halfway through the first half. About five minutes before the end of the half England prop, Jack Arkwright and his Australian counterpart, Ray Stehr were both sent off for fighting. This was the second time in the series that Stehr had been sent off and subsequently he was banned for three games while Arkwright was suspended until 31 July. With time running out in the first half England scored the only try of the half as Stan Brogden kicked over the Australian backs and Barney Hudson collected the ball to score in the corner. With Martin Hodgson converting the try, England led 5–2 at half-time.

In the second half the greater weight and skill of the English forwards saw England dominating play at the scrum, by the end of the game England had won 41 scrums to Australia's 14. England's second try came from a scrum as Emlyn Jenkins passed to Brogden who scored. Hodgson converted to make England's lead 10–2. A further Hodgson goal made it 12–2 before Australia scored a try in the last minutes of the match as Vic Hey touched down following a break through the English defence by Wally Prigg. With Brown adding the conversion to bring the scores to 12–7, the last minutes were tense but England held on to win the match and the series.

== New Zealand test series ==
=== First test ===
8 August 1936
3:00 pm NZDT

New Zealand	8 – 10	(United Kingdom) England
Goals: Puti Watene (3); Thomas Trevarthan		Tries: Alan Edwards; Emlyn Jenkins; Goals: Martin Hodgson (2)

Carlaw Park, Auckland
Attendance: 25,000
Referee: P. Rogers

New Zealand	Position	England
Jack Hemi	FB	Billy Belshaw
Len Scott	WG	Alan Edwards
Wally Tittleton	CE	Stan Brogden
Thomas Trevarthan	CE	Gus Risman (c)
Lou Brown	WG	Barney Hudson
Arthur Kay	FE/SO	Emlyn Jenkins
Roy Powell	HB/SH	Billy Watkins
Bill McNeight	PR	Jack Miller
Billy Glynn	HK	Tommy Armitt
Jim Calder	PR	Harry Field
Joe Cootes	SR	Martin Hodgson
Frank Pickrang	SR	Harry Woods
Puti Watene (c)	LK/LF	Alec Troup

The English came into the first test at Carlaw Park, Auckland with the same back line up from the third test in Australia and only two changes in the forwards with Field and Troup replacing Arkwright and Beverley. The game was one where the defences held the upper hand as England's dominance in the scrums was matched by New Zealand's backs controlling more of the open play. The first half only saw one score with New Zealand captain Puti Watene kicking the goal which gave New Zealand a 2–0 lead at the interval.

The first try went to England when from a scrum near the halfway line a passing movement along the threequarter line ended with winger Alan Edwards scoring in the corner. This gave England a narrow 3–2 lead which then changed hands twice as Watene and Hodgson traded goals. England then scored another try, again from a scrum, as stand-off Emlyn Jenkins ran through the New Zealand defensive line to score. With the conversion missed the score was 8–4 to England, two further penalties for Watene and Hodgson increased the score to 10–6. New Zealand tried to score in the dying minutes of the game but Thomas Trevarthan could only manage a field goal with the last play of the game to give England a 10–8 victory.

=== Second test ===
15 August 1936
3:00 pm NZDT

New Zealand	11 – 23	(United Kingdom) England
Tries: Joe Cootes; Goals: Puti Watene (4)		Tries: Jack Arkwright (2); Alan Edwards; Barney Hudson; Jack Miller; Goals: Gus Risman (4)

Carlaw Park, Auckland
Attendance: 17,000
Referee: Morris Wetherill

New Zealand	Position	England
Claude Dempsey	FB	Billy Belshaw
Ted Mincham	WG	Alan Edwards
Wally Tittleton	CE	Stan Brogden
Thomas Trevarthan	CE	Gus Risman (c)
Lou Brown	WG	Barney Hudson
Arthur Kay	FE/SO	Emlyn Jenkins
Roy Powell	HB/SH	Billy Watkins
Bill McNeight	PR	Jack Miller
Billy Glynn	HK	Tommy Armitt
Jim Calder	PR	Harry Field
Joe Cootes	SR	Jack Arkwright
Frank Pickrang	SR	Harry Woods
Puti Watene (c)	LK/LF	Alec Troup

The second test was played a week after the first, again at Carlaw Park in Auckland. England made one change with Jack Arkwright replacing Martin Hodgson in the forwards. New Zealand made two changes bringing Claude Dempsey in at fullback and Ted Mincham on the wing.

England opened the scoring with a Gus Risman penalty before Puti Watene levelled the score with a penalty. New Zealand had a try disallowed before England scored their first try as Arkwright scored from a try. Risman converted to make the score 7–2. Further tries from Alan Edwards and Jack Miller together with a Risman conversion gave England a 15–2 half-time advantage.

The start of the second half saw New Zealand with the advantage as a try by Joe Cootes sandwiched between two Watene penalties, and a Watene conversion brought New Zealand within four points of England. A further attack by New Zealand which would have closed the gap to one-point ended with England extending their lead as Barney Hudson intercepted a New Zealand pass and scored a try. Risman's conversion and a second try for Arkwright made the score 23–11 to England. Just before full-time England stand-off Emlyn Jenkins was sent off for arguing with the referee.
