= 1927–28 Challenge Cup =

Rugby league competition

- Duration: 5 rounds
- Winners: Swinton
- Runners-up: Warrington

The 1927–28 Challenge Cup was the 28th staging of rugby league's oldest knockout competition, the Challenge Cup.

== First round ==
Date	Home	Score	Away
11 February	Barrow	20–5	York
11 February	Batley	31–2	Cottingham
11 February	Bradford Northern	17–0	Twelve Apostles
11 February	Bramley (Note: game played at Headingley)	2–5	Hull FC
11 February	Castleford	7–3	Salford
11 February	Dewsbury	20–2	Broughton Rangers
11 February	Featherstone Rovers	28–0	Keighley
11 February	Halifax	4–4	Hunslet
11 February	Hull Kingston Rovers	19–0	Widnes
11 February	Oldham	15–5	St Helens
11 February	Rochdale Hornets	5–2	Leigh
11 February	St Helens Recs	12–0	Wakefield Trinity
11 February	Warrington	43–2	Kinsley (Note: Kinsley ceded home advantage)
11 February	Whitehaven Recs	0–44	Swinton
11 February	Wigan Highfield	2–13	Leeds
11 February	Wigan	2–13	Huddersfield

In the single first round replay Halifax beat Hunslet 16–2 on 15 February.

== Second round ==
Date	Home	Score	Away
25 February	Barrow	8–11	Oldham
25 February	Batley	12–6	Bradford Northern
25 February	Castleford	3–0	Featherstone Rovers
25 February	Dewsbury	7-7	Huddersfield
25 February	Halifax	2–3	Swinton
25 February	Hull Kingston Rovers	0–5	Warrington
25 February	Leeds	13–12	St Helens Recs
25 February	Rochdale Hornets	3–3	Hull FC

In the two replays Huddersfield beat Dewsbury 16–8 on 29 February and Hull FC beat 16–0 on 1 March.

== Third round ==
Date	Home	Score	Away
10 March	Castleford	0–3	Swinton
10 March	Hull FC	0–0	Batley
10 March	Leeds	10–5	Oldham
10 March	Warrington	10–3	Huddersfield

Having played out a scoreless game Batley and Hull FC repeated the score in a replay on 20 March and the tie went to a second replay which Hull won 6–2 on neutral territory, Headingley, on 26 March.

== Semi-finals ==
Date	Drawn first	Score	Drawn second	Venue	Attendance	Receipts
31 March	Swinton	5–3	Hull FC	Fartown, Huddersfield	12,000	£794
31 March	Warrington	9–2	Leeds	Athletic Grounds, Rochdale	22,000	£1,463

== Final ==
Swinton beat Warrington 5–3 in the final played at Central Park, Wigan on Saturday 14 April 1928. The game generated receipts of £3159 1s 11d and the attendance of 33,909 set a new record for a game at Central Park.

This was Swinton's third Challenge Cup Final win from four Final appearances and completed a League and Cup double for the club.

14 April 1928

Swinton	5 – 3	Warrington
Tries: Brockbank; Goals: J. Evans		Tries: Seeling

Central Park, Wigan
Attendance: 33,909
Referee: H. Horsfall (Batley)

FB	1	Billy Young
RW	2	Frank Evans
RC	3	Hector Halsall
LC	4	Jack Evans
LW	5	Chris Brockbank
SO	6	William Rees
SH	7	Albert Atkinson
PR	8	Miller Strong
HK	9	Henry Blewer
PR	10	Herbert Morris
SR	11	Martin Hodgson
SR	12	Dick Cracknell
LF	13	Fred Beswick
Coach:

FB	1	Arthur Frowen
RW	2	Billy Rhodes
RC	3	Jesse Meredith
LC	4	Les Perkins
LW	5	Dai Davies
SO	6	Tommy Flynn
SH	7	Billy Kirk
PR	8	Billy Cunliffe
HK	9	Alf Peacock
PR	10	Cod Miller
SR	11	Jim Tranter
SR	12	Frank Williams
LF	13	Charles Seeling
Coach:
