= 1929–30 Lancashire Cup =

- Structure: Regional knockout competitionm
- Teams: 13
- Champions: Warrington
- Runners-up: Salford

The 1929–30 Lancashire Cup was the 22nd occasion on which this regional rugby league competition had been held. Warrington won the trophy by beating Salford in the final by 15–2. The match was played at Central Park, Wigan. The attendance at the final was 21,012 and receipts £1,250.

== Background ==
The number of teams entering this year's competition remained at 13 which resulted in 3 byes in the first round.

The semi-final clash between Salford and Swinton took two replays to decide. This resulted in Salford playing 5 matches (a semi-final, a league match, two replays and a final) within 11 days.

== Competition and results ==
=== Round 1 ===
Involved 5 matches (with three byes) and 13 clubs

Game No	Fixture date	Home team	Score	Away team	Venue	Att	Rec	Notes	Ref
1	Sat 12 October 1929	Barrow	12–0	Widnes	Little Park, Roose				
2	Sat 12 October 1929	Broughton Rangers	9–10	St. Helens	The Cliff				
3	Sat 12 October 1929	Leigh	3–6	Warrington	Mather Lane				
4	Sat 12 October 1929	Rochdale Hornets	15–11	Wigan Highfield	Athletic Grounds				
5	Sat 12 October 1929	Wigan	5–10	Oldham	Central Park				
6		St Helens Recs		bye					
7		Salford		bye					
8		Swinton		bye					

=== Round 2 – quarter-finals ===
Game No	Fixture date	Home team	Score	Away team	Venue	Att	Rec	Notes	Ref
1	Mon 21 October 1929	Oldham	8–2	St Helens Recs	Watersheddings				
2	Wed 23 October 1929	St. Helens	8–8	Salford	Knowsley Road				
3	Wed 23 October 1929	Swinton	38–3	Rochdale Hornets	Station Road			1	
4	Thu 24 October 1929	Barrow	7–9	Warrington	Little Park, Roose				
Replay
5	Sat 30 October 1929	Salford	13–3	St. Helens	The Willows				

=== Round 3 – semi-finals ===
Game No	Fixture date	Home team	Score	Away team	Venue	Att	Rec	Notes	Ref
1	Mon 11 November 1929	Oldham	5–7	Warrington	Watersheddings				
2	Wed 13 November 1929	Swinton	3–3	Salford	Station Road			2	
1st Replay
3	Mon 18 November 1929	Salford	0–0	Swinton	The Willows			2	
2nd Replay
4	Wed 20 November 1929	Swinton	0–8	Salford	The Cliff				

=== Final ===
Game No	Fixture date	Home team	Score	Away team	Venue	Att	Rec	Notes	Ref
	Saturday 23 November 1929	Warrington	15–2	Salford	Central Park	21,012	£1,250	2 3	

==== Teams and scorers ====
Warrington	№	Salford
	Teams	
Billy Holding	1	Gus Risman
Tommy Blinkhorn	2	Sid Boyd
Les Perkins (c)	3	Richard Manning
Billy Dingsdale	4	George Dobing
Thomas "Tubby" Thompson	5	Barney Hudson
William "Billy" Kirk	6	Sammy Miller
Tommy Flynn	7	Reg Meek
Jack Miller	8	Billy Williams
Alfred Peacock	9	Fred Shaw
Billy Cunliffe	10	Jack Muir
Frank Williams	11	Teddy Haines
Jesse Meredith	12	Alf Middleton
Charlie Seeling Jr.	13	Aubrey Casewell
15	score	2
7	HT	0
	Scorers	
	Tries	
William "Billy" Kirk (1)	T	
Jesse Meredith (1)	T	
Tommy Blinkhorn (1)	T	
	Goals	
Billy Holding (3)	G	George Dobing
	Drop Goals	
	DG	
Referee		

Scoring – Try = three points; Goal = two points; Drop goal = two points

=== The road to success ===
First round
Wigan	5
Oldham	10
St Helens Recs
bye
Barrow	12
Widnes	0
Leigh	3
Warrington	6
Swinton
bye
Rochdale Hornets	15
Wigan Highfield	11
Broughton Rangers	9
St. Helens	10
Salford
bye

Second round
Oldham	8
St Helens Recs	2
Barrow	7
Warrington	9
Swinton	38
Rochdale Hornets	3
St. Helens	8(3)
Salford	8(13)

Semifinals
Oldham	5
Warrington	7
Swinton	3(0)(0)
Salford	3(0)(8)

Final
Warrington	15
Salford	2

== See also ==
- 1929–30 Northern Rugby Football League season
