= 1921–22 Lancashire Cup =

- Structure: Regional knockout competition
- Teams: 14
- Winners: Warrington
- Runners-up: Oldham

The 1921–22 Lancashire Cup competition, the fourteenth contest for this regional rugby league competition, saw a new name on the trophy, Warrington. They beat Oldham in the final at The Cliff, Broughton, Salford by a score of 7–5.

== Background ==
The number of teams entering this year's competition remained at the previous level of 14, this enabled the competition to be run with only 2 byes in the first round.

== Competition and results ==
=== Round 1 ===
Involved 6 matches (with two byes) and 14 clubs

Game No	Fixture date	Home team	Score	Away team	Venue	Att	Rec	Notes	Ref
1	Sat 22 October 1921	Broughton Rangers	5–0	Wigan	The Cliff				
2	Sat 22 October 1921	Leigh	3–2	Wigan Highfield	Mather Lane				
3	Sat 22 October 1921	Rochdale Hornets	0–2	Oldham	Athletic Grounds				
4	Sat 22 October 1921	St Helens Recs	0–0	Swinton	City Road				
5	Sat 22 October 1921	Widnes	6–0	Salford	Lowerhouse Lane				
6	Sat 29 October 1921	Barrow	25–0	Askam	Little Park, Roose				
7		St. Helens		bye					
8		Warrington		bye					
Replay
9	Wed 26 October 1921	Swinton	2–8	St Helens Recs	Chorley Road ground				

=== Round 2 – quarterfinals ===
Game No	Fixture date	Home team	Score	Away team	Venue	Att	Rec	Notes	Ref
1	Sat 5 November 1921	Barrow	10–3	Broughton Rangers	Little Park, Roose				
2	Sat 5 November 1921	St. Helens	5–17	Oldham	Knowsley Road				
3	Sat 5 November 1921	Warrington	5–3	St Helens Recs	Wilderspool				
4	Sat 5 November 1921	Widnes	2–2	Leigh	Lowerhouse Lane				
Replay
1	Wed 9 November 1921	Leigh	5–3	Widnes	Mather Lane				

=== Semi finals ===
Game No	Fixture date	Home team	Score	Away team	Venue	Att	Rec	Notes	Ref
1	Sat 19 November 1921	Oldham	17–8	Barrow	Watersheddings				
2	Sat 19 November 1921	Warrington	13–7	Leigh	Wilderspool				

=== Final ===
The final was watched by 18,000 and receipts were £1,200.

3 December 1921

Warrington	7 – 5	Oldham
Tries: Bradbury; Goals: Jolley (2)		Tries: Ferguson; Goals: Farrar

The Cliff, Broughton
Attendance: 18,000
Referee: A. Brown (Wakefield)

==== Teams and scorers ====
Warrington	№	Oldham
Ben Jolley	1	Ernie Knapman
Bob Bradbury	2	Ned Thomas
Charlie Collins	3	Jim Finnerty
Jim Tranter	4	Evan Davies
Bert Cartwright	5	Reg Farrar
Jack Prescott (c)	6	Billy Hall
Tommy Anderson	7	Maurice Tighe
Billy Cunliffe	8	Joe Ferguson
Alfred Peacock	9	Alfred Tomkins
Robert Mather	10	Fred Brown
Tommy Cunliffe	11	Jack Collins
Ernest Ogden	12	Tom Rees
Jim Fearnley	13	Willie Thomas

Scoring – Try = three (3) points – Goal = two (2) points – Drop goal = two (2) points

=== The road to success ===
First round
Warrington
bye
St Helens Recs	0(8)
Swinton	0(2)
Widnes	6
Salford	0
Leigh	3
Wigan Highfield	2
St. Helens
bye
Rochdale Hornets	0
Oldham	2
Barrow
Askam
Broughton Rangers	25
Wigan	0

Second round
Warrington	5
St Helens Recs	3
Widnes	2(3)
Leigh	2(5)
St. Helens	5
Oldham	17
Barrow	10
Broughton Rangers	3

Semifinals
Warrington	13
Leigh	7
Oldham	17
Barrow	8

Final
Warrington	7
Oldham	5

== See also ==
- 1921–22 Northern Rugby Football Union season
