= List of Old Boys of St Joseph's College, Hunters Hill =

Former students of the Roman Catholic Church school, St Joseph's College in Hunters Hill, New South Wales, Australia are known as "Old Boys".

[Year 1969] is the last year of school attendance. (Years in parentheses) are years lived or the year of notable achievement. Chronology is determined (as far as is known) by alumnus' last year at the College.

== Clergy ==
- Matthew Joseph Brodie (1864–1943), second Bishop of Christchurch, New Zealand (1915–1943), first New Zealand born Catholic bishop. At SJC 1888–1890.
- Most Rev Geoffrey James Robinson (1937–2020), Auxiliary Bishop of Sydney 1984–2004, Titular Bishop of Rusuca. Born 1937 at Richmond NSW. Died 1977. Vicar for Education in the Sydney Archdiocese. Author. Canonist. Lived the last 32 years of his life at St Josephs parish church Enfield. (Honorary Old Boy.)
- John Steven Satterthwaite (1928–2016), Bishop of Lismore 1971–2001. At SJC 1941–1945.
- Most Rev Philip Edward Wilson (1950–2021), D.D. J.C.L., Archbishop of Adelaide. At SJC 1963-1968.
- Hugh Edward Ryan Second Bishop of Townsville. Died 1977. At SJC 1921–1924. Attended the Second Vatican Council being the 21st Ecumenical Council.
- Albert Reuben Edward Thomas 6th Bishop of Bathurst 1963–1983. At SJC 1921–1924. Attended the Second Vatican Council being the 21st Ecumenical Council. Headed Catholic Action, Catholic Social Welfare and Pontifical Mission Aid Society.
- Anthony Gerard Percy Episcopal Ordination as Auxiliary Bishop of Sydney 2 May 2025. SJC circa 1980.
- Rev Bernard (Bernie) Hennessy. SJC Circa 1950s. 28 years as an Australian Army Chaplain.
- Rev James Hargrave SM. 30.5.34 – 2.5.25. Chaplain at SJC from 1977. Born Tweed Heads. While working in Sydney, received into the church at St Patricks Church Hill 7.7.1955. Attended the Aquinas Academy led by Dr Austin Woodbury – whose legacy continues in his students and his students students and at Campion College Sydney. In his last years, chaplain to elderly Marist Brothers at Ashgrove Qld. (Honorary Old Boy)

== Media, entertainment and the arts ==
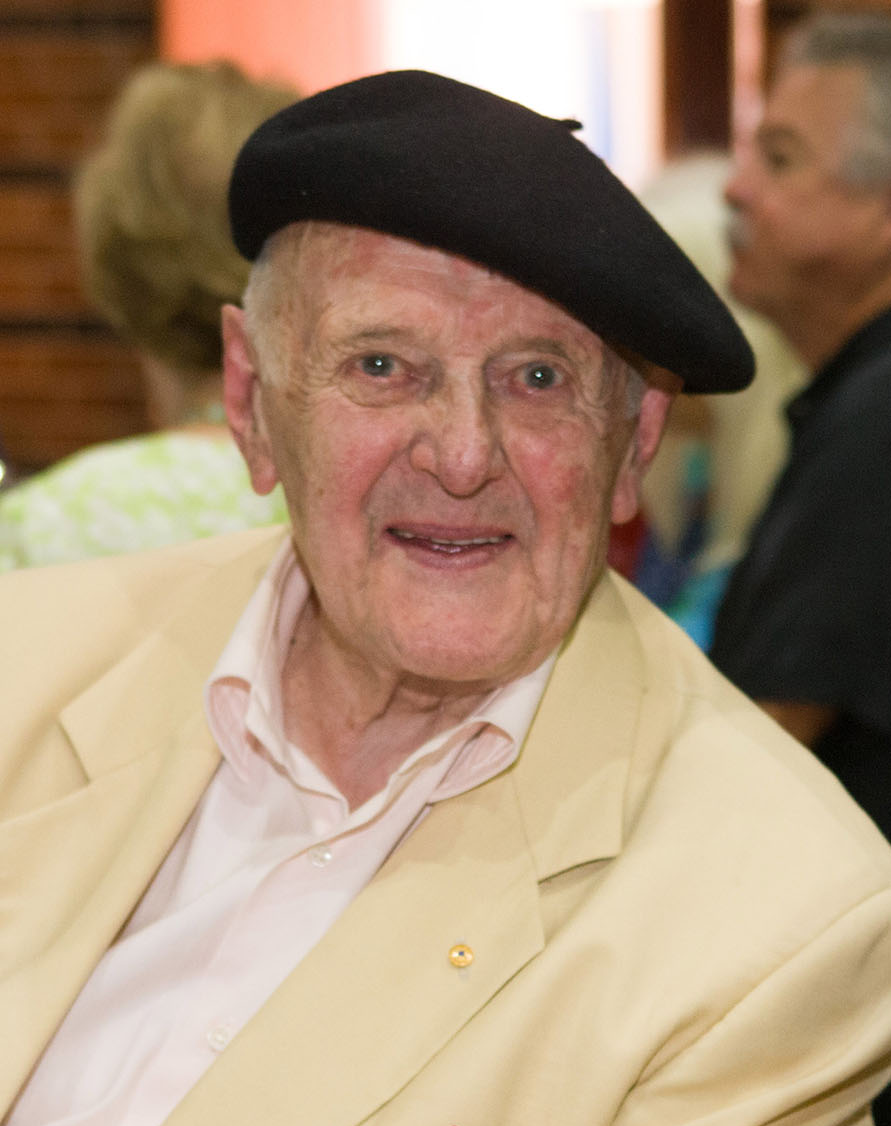
John Olsen

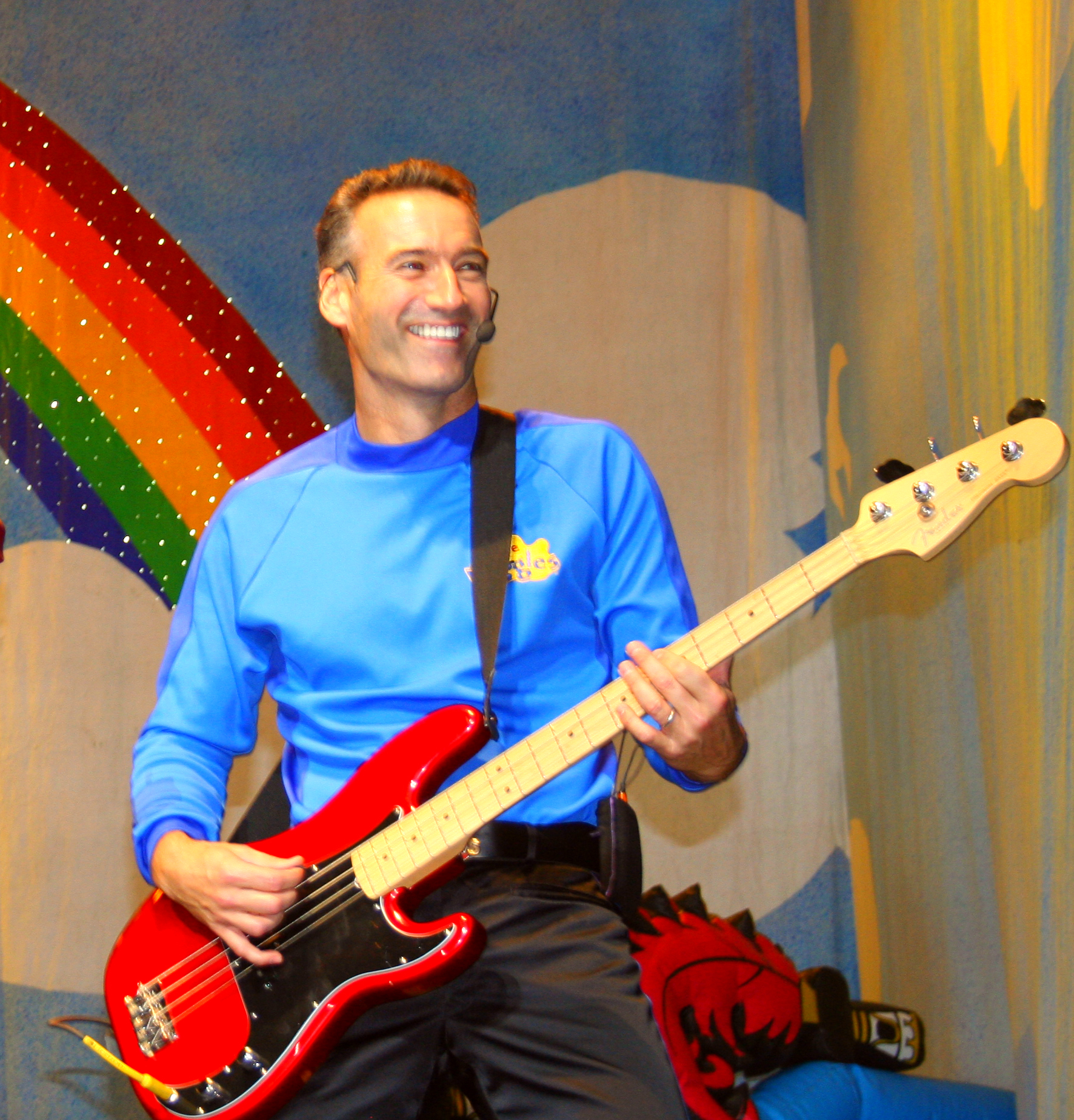
Anthony Field

- Frank Marien (1890–1936), Editor-in-chief of Smith's Weekly.
- Jimmy Sharman jnr (1912–2006), boxing promoter.
- John Olsen, AO, OBE [1943], (1928–2023) artist.
- Denis Kevans (1939–2005), left-wing poet, songwriter and folk singer.
- Brian Castro (born 1950), award-winning novelist & essayist.
- Jack Waterford (born 1952), former editor-in-chief of the Canberra Times.
- Peter Thompson (born 1952), ABC broadcaster & Adjunct Professor, Macquarie Uni, Dept of International Communication.
- Paul Field [1978], (born 1961), singer The Cockroaches and manager The Wiggles.
- John Field [1979], (born 1962), guitarist The Cockroaches and songwriter.
- Anthony Field [1980], (born 1963), guitarist and singer The Cockroaches and The Wiggles.
- Tony Henry [1980], (born 1963), drummer of the '80s pop band The Cockroaches.
- Tom Gleeson [1991], (born 1974), comedian, actor and radio personality.

== Military ==
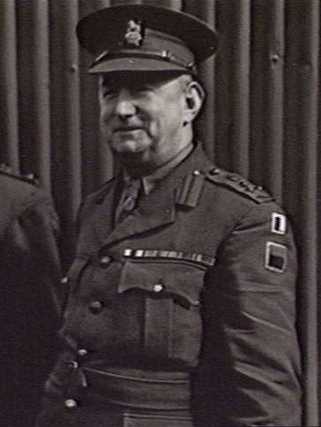
Eugene Gorman

- Brigadier Sir Eugene Gorman (1891–1973), KBE, MC, QC military officer and barrister.
- Air Marshal Sir John McCauley (1899–1989), KBE, CB, RAAF commander.

== Law ==
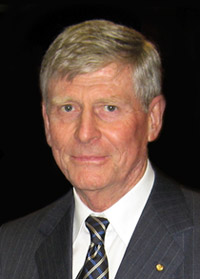
Murray Gleeson

- Sir William Prentice MBE (1917–2004), Justice Supreme Court of Papua New Guinea 1969–79; Chief Justice of PNG 1978–79.
- Hon. Justice Peter McInerney [1945], (1927–2014), New South Wales Supreme Court judge.
- Sir William Deane AC KBE [1947] (born 1931), former Governor-General and former Justice of the High Court of Australia.
- Hon. Chief Justice Murray Gleeson AC [1955], (born 1938), former Chief Justice Australia – High Court of Australia; former Chief Justice NSW – Supreme Court of New South Wales; former President NSW Bar Association.
- John Marsden (1942–2006), President of the Law Society of NSW.
- Hon. Michael Grant (born 1963), Chief Justice of the Northern Territory

== Politics ==
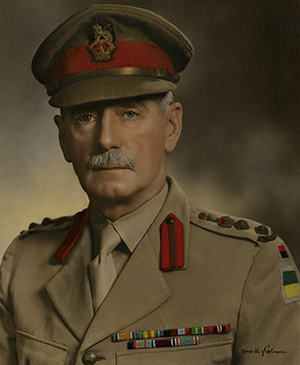
Jack Keith Murray

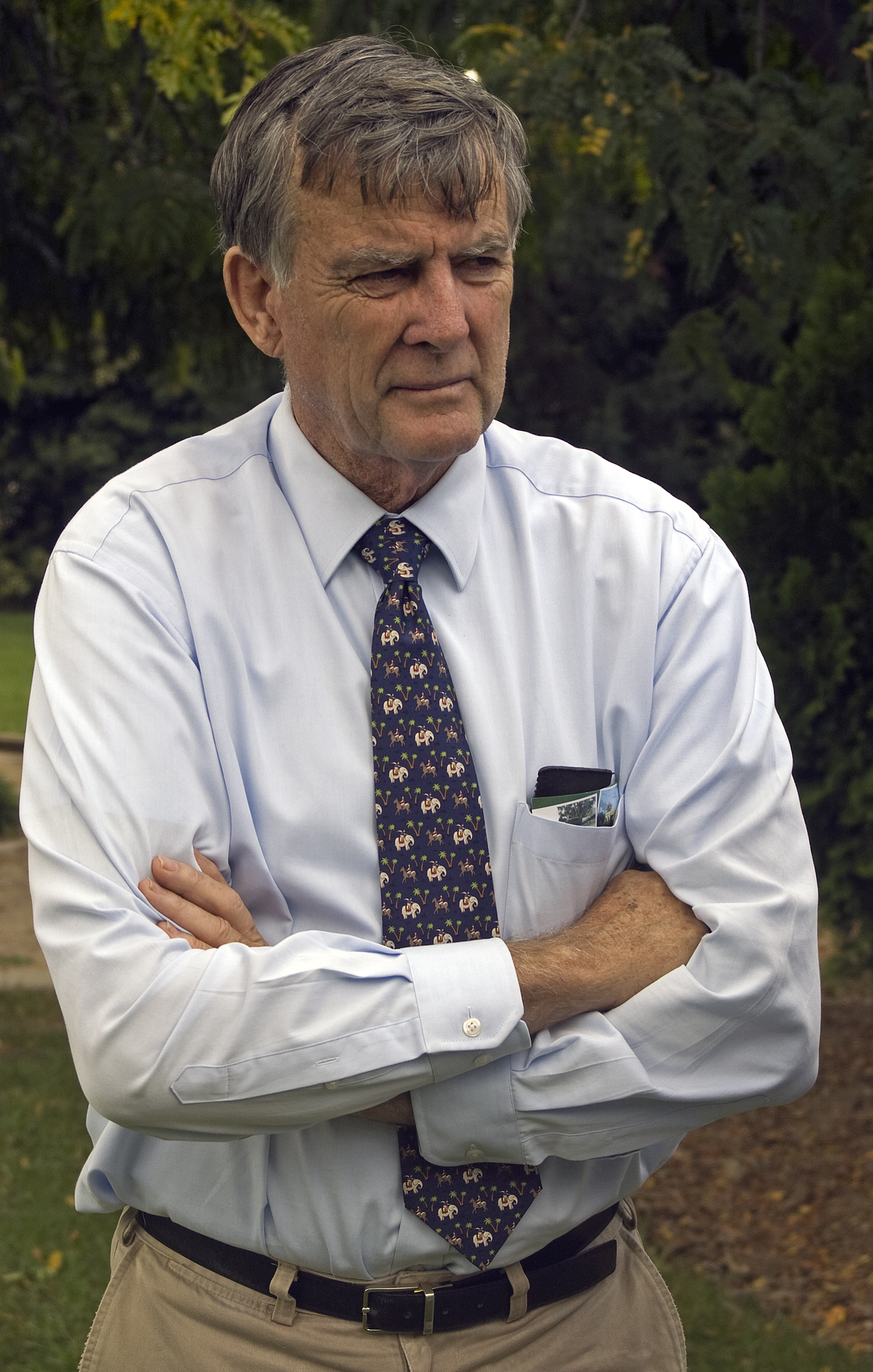
Bill Heffernan

- Colonel His Honour Sir Jack Keith Murray, KBE [1906] (1889–1979), Administrator of Papua and New Guinea 1945–1952.
- Frank Downing (1907–1978), ALP MLA for Ryde, 1953–1968.
- Norm Ryan (1912–1997), ALP MLA for Marrickville, 1953–73.
- Harry Jensen (1913–1998), Lord Mayor of Sydney 1956–65, ALP MLA for Wyong & Munmorah, 1965–1981 and NSW Cabinet Minister 1976–81.
- Jack Doohan OBE (1920–2007), National Party member of the New South Wales Legislative Council 1978–91.
- Laurie McGinty MBE (1921–1991), Mayor of Willoughby 1960-67, Lib MLA for Willoughby 1968–1978 and NSW Cabinet Minister 1973–76.
- Hon Kevin Cairns [1945] (1929–1984), Lib, MHR seat of Lilley in Queensland 1963-80; Federal Cabinet Minister 1971–72.
- Alan Woods AC (1930–1990), Secretary of the Department of Defence 1986–88
- Ernie Page OAM [1952] (1935–2018), Mayor of Waverley (Alderman 1962–1987), ALP MLA for Waverley (1981–1991) & Coogee (1991–2003) Minister for Local Government (1995–1999).
- Bill Heffernan (born 1943), Lib Senator for New South Wales since 1996.
- Kevin Conolly [1976], Liberal MLA from 2011 to 2023, for the seat of Riverstone.
- Craig Laundy [1988], Liberal MHR seat of Reid since 2013 and former Minister for Small and Family Business, the Workplace and Deregulation 2017–18.
- Pat Conaghan [1988], National MHR seat of Cowper since 2019.
- Tim Quilty (Victorian politician) [1991], (born 1973) Member of the Victorian Legislative Council since November 2018 for the Liberal Democrats party.
- Peter Sidgreaves [1992], Liberal MLA from 2019 to 2023, for the seat of Camden.
- Stephen Lawrence [1992] Mayor of Dubbo 2021, ALP MLC since 2023.
- Roy Butler [1994] (born 1977), MLA for the seat of Barwon since March 2019.
- Justin Clancy [1995] (born 1977), Liberal MLA for the seat of Albury since March 2019.
- Brendan Moylan [1998] (born 1980), Nationals MLA for the seat of Northern Tablelands since 2024.

== Science, medicine and academia ==
John Lee

- Victor Warren Fazio (1940–2015), Pioneering colorectal surgeon
- James Franklin [1970] (born 1953), Philosopher and historian
- Ted O'Loughlin [1969], Head of Gastroenterology, Westmead Children's Hospital
- John Lee [1991] (born 1973), Australian academic and policy expert

== Business ==
- Shane Moran [1979] (born 1961), aged-care entrepreneur and protector of Sydney's historic properties Swifts and Darling House.

== Sport ==
=== Administration ===
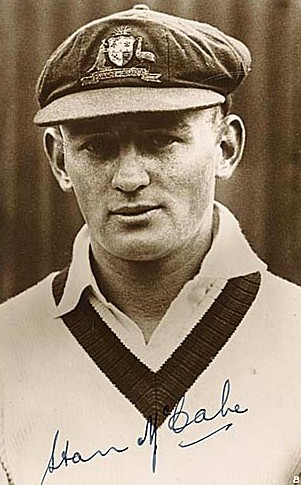
Stan McCabe

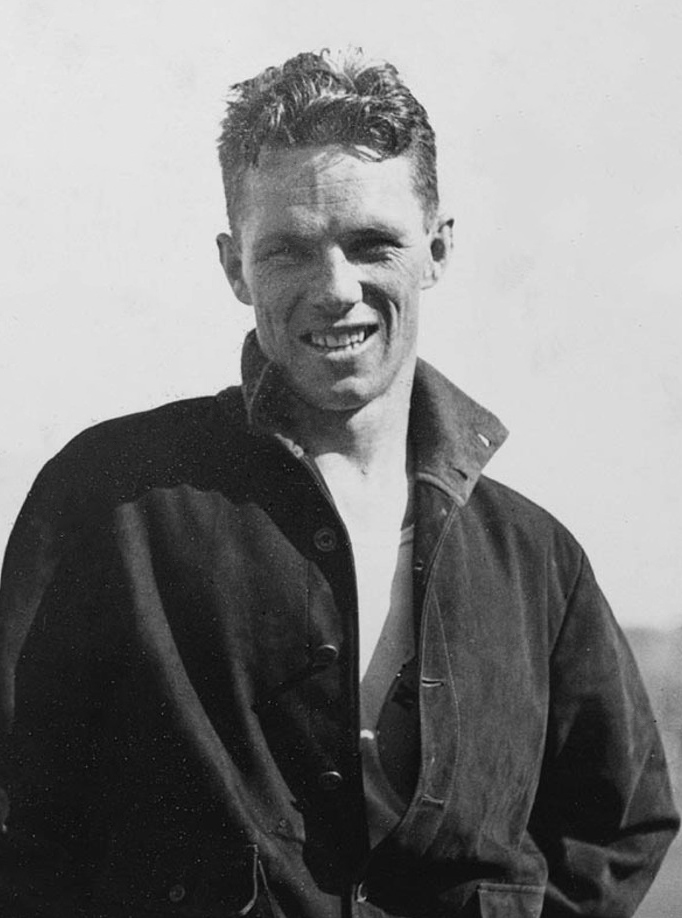
Jim Carlton

- John O'Neill, former CEO of Australian Rugby Union and Football Federation Australia, chairman of Star Entertainment Group
- Matt Carroll, former CEO of Yachting Australia and in 2017 appointed CEO of the Australian Olympic Committee.

=== Athletics ===
- Richard Honner, 400yd and long jump at the 1924 Paris Olympics.
- Jimmy Carlton, 100 and 200yd sprinter at the 1928 Amsterdam Olympics.
- Patrick Dwyer, silver medalist 4 × 400 m Relay Athens 2004, competitor Sydney 2000 & 1998 Commonwealth Games.

=== Cricket ===
- Stan McCabe, Australian Test Cricketer 39 Tests (1930–38).

=== Paralympics ===
- Evan O'Hanlon [2006], (born 1988) OAM, 5 x time gold-medal winning paralympic sprinter.

=== Rowing ===
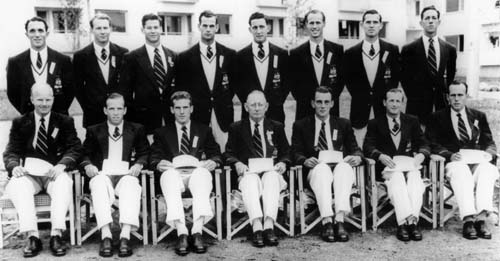
Cayzer front 2nd left & Tinning front right - 1952 Olympic squad

- William Dixon [1928], 1936 Berlin Olympics (M2x).
- Clyde Elias [1929], 1936 Berlin Olympics (M8+).
- Phil Cayzer gold medalist Auckland 1950 (M8+) & bronze medalist at Helsinki 1952 (M8+).
- Bob Tinning gold medalist at Auckland 1950 (M8+) & bronze medalist at Helsinki 1952 (M8+).
- Alf Duval, silver medalist 1968 Mexico Olympics, (M8+).
- Joe Fazio [1960] (1942–2011), silver medalist 1968 Mexico Olympics, (M8+).
- Paul Rowe [1964] (1949–2015), finalist 1975 World C'ships (LM1X) & eight-time Australian champion.
- Ted O'Loughlin [1969], 1974 World C'ships (M8+).
- Terry O'Hanlon [1972], coxswain 1975 & 77 World C'ships (M2+) & (M8+).
- Daniel Burke [1992], silver medalist Sydney 2000, M8.
- Francis Hegerty [2000], silver medalist Beijing 2008, M4–.
- Spencer Turrin, [2009], 2017 and 2018 World Champion (M4–); Rio 2016 Olympian M2-;Tokyo 2020 Olympic champion M4-.
- Tom Birtwhistle [2010], Paralympian at Tokyo 2020 and finalist 2022 World Championships (PR1 M1X).
- Jack Hargreaves [2011], 2017 and 2018 World Champion M4–, Tokyo 2020 Olympic champion M4–.
- Campbell Watts [2013], silver medallist 2018 World Championships (M4X).
- Jack O'Brien [2016], Olympian & silver medallist 2022 World Championships (M4–).
- William O'Shannessy [2017], bronze medallist 2022 World Championships (M8+).

=== Rugby league ===
==== National representatives ====
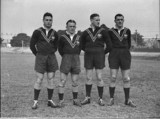
Beaton (l) & Crippin (r) Kangaroos 1936

- Harry Caples, Kangaroo five-eighth, (1921–1922).
- Arch Crippin [1935], Kangaroo winger, (1936).
- Jack Beaton, Kangaroo versatile back, (1936–1938).
- Paul Chue [1963], inaugural Kumuls captain, (1975).
- Ben Kennedy [1992], Kangaroo lock-forward, (2000–2006).
- Tommy Ryan [1947], Kangaroo winger, (four Tests, 1952).

==== First grade ====
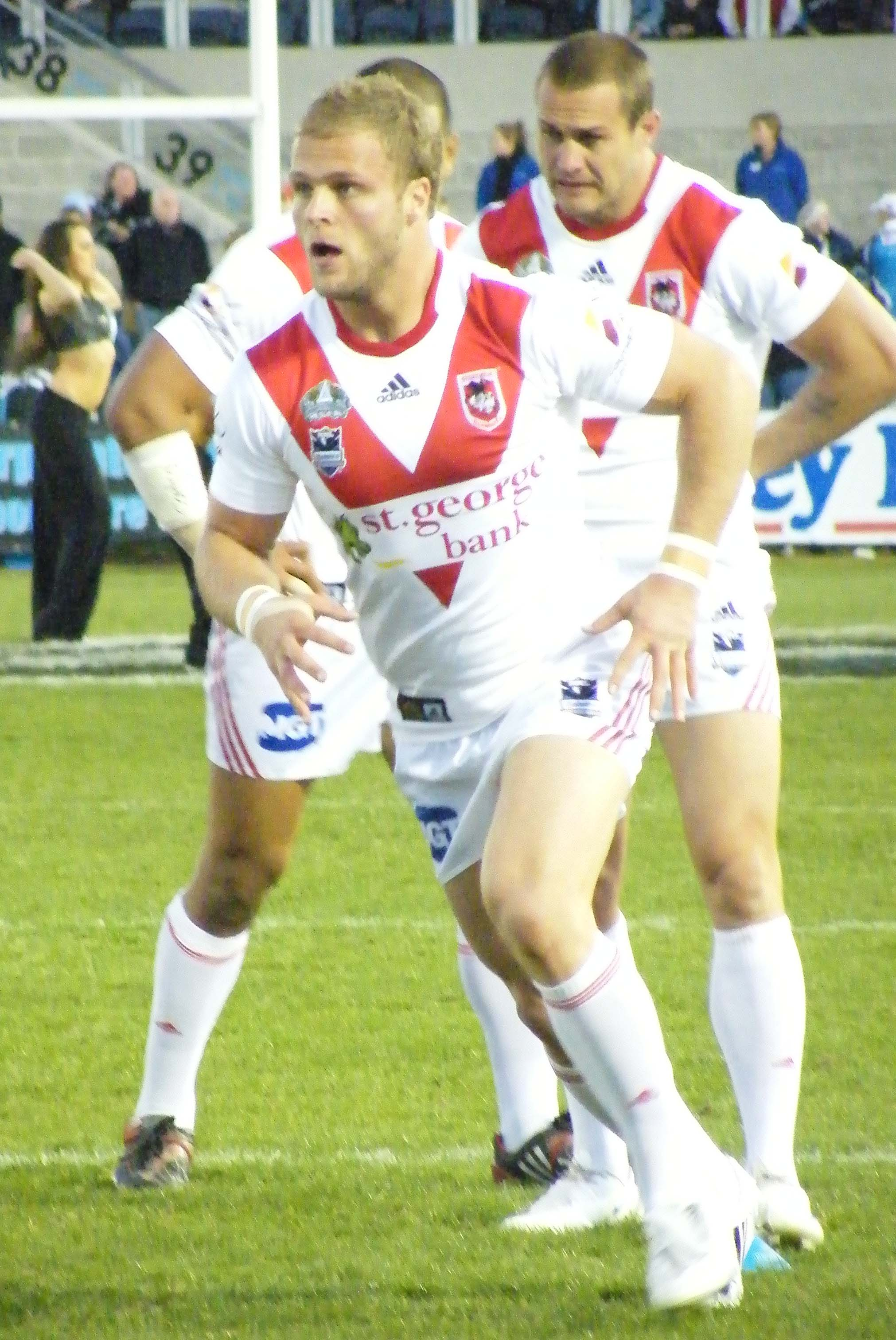
Jarrod Saffy

- Vince Sheehan [1933], Wests Magpies centre (1934–36).
- Morrie Murphy, Canterbury-Bankstown Bulldogs Winger (1947)
- Steve Broughton [1974], Wests Magpies (1982–1984) & Parramatta (1985) winger.
- Mick Aldous [1978], Canberra Raiders centre (1984–85) and French Rugby League national coach.
- Matthew Wurth [1978], North Sydney forward (1983–85).
- Justin Dooley, Wests Magpies & Sydney City Roosters (1990–2001).
- Darren Junee, Sydney City Roosters (1995–1998).
- Peter Jorgensen [1990], Sydney City Roosters (1995–1996). Penrith Panthers (1997–2001).
- Jarrod Saffy, St George Dragons & Wests Magpies forward (2006–10) and Melbourne Rebels RU lock (2011–2013).
- Darcy Lussick [2006], Parramatta Eels & Manly-Warringah Sea Eagles forward (2012–18).
- Nathan Ross [2006], Newcastle Knights winger (2015–2018).

=== Rugby union ===
==== Wallabies ====
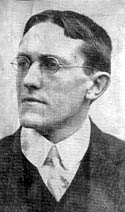
Herbert Moran, Wallaby captain

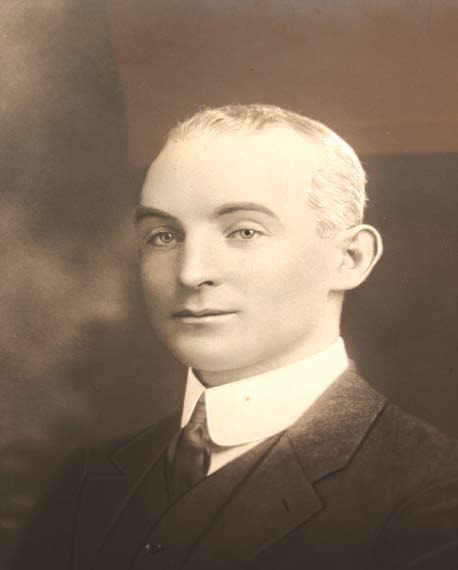
Edward Larkin MLA

- Dr Herbert Moran, Wallaby 1 Test (1908–09) and captain in 16 matches
- Ted Fahey, Wallaby 4 Tests (1912–14) and captain in 7 matches
- Edward Larkin [1896], Wallaby hooker, 1 Test (1903), MLA and soldier;
- Bill Cody, Wallaby flanker, 3 Tests (1913);
- Ernie Reid, Wallaby centre, 3 Tests (1925);
- Harry Woods, Wallaby prop, 8 Tests (1925–1928);
- Eric Ford (1904–86), Wallaby winger, 7 Tests (1927–29);
- Jack Ford [1924], (1906–85) [1924] Wallaby #8, 11 Tests (1925–30);
- Bill White, Wallaby winger, 3 Tests (1928–32);
- Jack Malone, Wallaby prop-forward 4 Tests, (1936–37);
- Bill Monti, Wallaby lock, 1 Test (1938);
- Paul Johnson, Wallaby centre, 2 Tests (1946);
- Des Bannon, Wallaby fly-half, 1 Test (1946);
- Brian Piper, Wallaby fullback, (1946–49);
- Arthur Tonkin, Wallaby winger, 6 Tests (1947–50);
- Jack Blomley, Wallaby centre, 7 Tests, (1949–50);
- Vince Heinrich, Wallaby flanker, 2 Tests (1954)
- Barry Roberts, Wallaby winger, 1 Test (1956);
- Terry Curley [1955], Wallaby fullback, 9 Tests (1957–58)
- John O'Gorman, Wallaby #8, 18 Tests (1961–67);
- Ted Heinrich, Wallaby flanker, 10 Tests (1961–63);
- Peter Ryan [1957], Wallaby fullback, 4 Tests (1963–66);
- Jake Howard, Wallaby prop-forward, 7 Tests (1970–73);
- Chris Carberry, Wallaby hooker, 13 Tests (1973–82);
- Steve Williams, Wallaby 28 Tests (1980–1985) and captain in 7 matches;
- Bruce Malouf, Wallaby hooker, 1 Test (1982);
- Tony Daly, Wallaby prop, 41 Tests (1989–95);
- Darren Junee, Wallaby fullback, 4 Tests (1989–94) and NSWRL player (Sydney Roosters);
- Tim Kelaher, Wallaby fullback, 3 Tests (1992–93);
- Peter Jorgensen, Wallaby winger, 2 tests (1992)
- Matt Burke OAM [1990], Wallaby fullback, 81 Tests (1993–2004);
- Mark Bell, Wallaby hooker, 1 Test (1996);
- Bill Young, Wallaby prop, 46 Tests (2000–2005);
- Alister Campbell, Wallaby lock, 4 Tests (2005);
- Brett Sheehan, Wallaby scrum-half, 7 Tests (2006–2012) and NRL player (South Sydney)
- Luke Burgess [2001], scrum-half 37 Tests, (2008–2011);
- Kurtley Beale, [2006] Centre, Fly Half, Fullback 96 Tests (2009–2019)
- Paddy Ryan, prop 3 Tests (2012–2014)
- Peter Betham, Wing, Centre 2 Tests (2013)
- Laurie Weeks, Tighthead Prop, 2 Tests (2013–2014)
- Tom Robertson [2012], prop 24 Tests (2016–)
- Ned Hanigan [2013], flanker 21 Tests (2017–)
- Tom Wright [2015], winger (2020–) and NRL Manly-Warringah Sea Eagles (2018).
- Max Jorgensen [2022], Wallaby fullback/wing, 5 tests (2023–)

==== Other nations' representatives ====
- Steve Devine [1994], 10 Test appearances New Zealand (2002–2003).
- Michael Lipman [1998], 10 Test appearances for England (2004–2008).
- Pat Duignan, 2 RWC appearances for Ireland (1998).

==== International rugby sevens ====
- Pat McCutcheon, Australian Rugby Sevens (2010–)

==== State/provincial ====
- Peter Playford, NSW Waratahs and Australian Sevens three-quarter 2007–09.
- Afusipa Taumoepeau, Melbourne Rebels ACT Brumbies centre 2008–10.
- Jeremy Tilse, NSW Waratahs prop 2007–17
- Cameron Treloar, Queensland Reds lock 2006–07.
- Drew Hickey, NSW Waratahs flanker 2000–02.
- Matthew Carraro, NSW Waratahs centre/wing 2008–09, 2014–17
- Damien Fitzpatrick, NSW Waratahs hooker 2009–13, 2017–current.
- Alex Newsome, NSW Waratahs centre/wing 2018–current.
- Matthew Sandell, NSW Waratahs prop 2017–current.
- Andrew Deegan, Western Force fly half 2018–current.
- James Ramm [2015], NSW Waratahs Wing 2020–current
- Michael Icely, Melbourne Rebels flanker 2021–current
- Max Jorgensen [2022], New South Wales Waratahs fullback/wing 2023–current

=== Football ===
- Daniel Alessi, professional footballer for the Newcastle Jets.
- Cristian Volpato. professional footballer for Roma, Italy u19 and Italy U21.

=== Water polo ===
- Sam McGregor, Olympian 2004, 2008 and 2012.

== See also ==
- List of non-government schools in New South Wales
- List of boarding schools
- Athletic Association of the Great Public Schools of New South Wales

== Published sources ==
- Howell, Max (2006) Born to Lead - Wallaby Test Captains (2005) Celebrity Books, New Zealand
- Whiticker, Alan & Hudson, Glen (2006) The Encyclopedia of Rugby League Players, Gavin Allen Publishing, Sydney
- "Oh brother! Medich family split". smh.com.au. 11 September 2009.
