= Crippin =

Crippin is a surname. Notable people with the surname include:

- Arch Crippin (1916–2008), Australian rugby league footballer
- Chris Crippin (born 1974), Canadian drummer
- Edward Frederick Crippin (1848–1892), English businessman
