= Tom Blinkhorn =

GB & England international rugby league footballer

Personal information
- Full name: Thomas Blinkhorn
- Born: 23 April 1903 Wigan, England
- Died: 15 June 1976 (aged 73) Wigan, England

Playing information
- Height: 5 ft 8 in (1.73 m)
- Weight: 12 st 10 lb (81 kg)
- Position: Fullback, Wing
Club
| Years | Team | Pld | T | G | FG | P |
|---|---|---|---|---|---|---|
| 1924–28 | Wigan Highfield | 74 | 28 | 44 | 0 | 172 |
| 1928–33 | Warrington | 126 | 52 | 36 | 0 | 228 |
| 1933–36 | Broughton Rangers | 26 | 1 | 32 | 0 | 67 |
| | Total | 226 | 81 | 112 | 0 | 467 |
Representative
| Years | Team | Pld | T | G | FG | P |
| 1929 | England | 1 | 2 | 0 | 0 | 6 |
| 1930 | Great Britain | 1 | 0 | 0 | 0 | 0 |

Thomas Blinkhorn (23 April 1903 – 15 June 1976) was an English professional rugby league footballer who played in the 1920s and 1930s. He played at representative level for Great Britain and England, and at club level for Wigan Highfield, Warrington and Broughton Rangers, as a fullback, or wing.

== Background ==
Blinkhorn was born in Wigan, Lancashire, and he died aged 73 in Wigan, Greater Manchester, England.

== Playing career ==
He started playing rugby league for Wigan Highfield before moving to Warrington. Blinkhorn played and scored a try in Warrington's 15-2 victory over Salford in the 1929 Lancashire Cup Final at Central Park, Wigan on Saturday 23 November 1929. Blinkhorn, won a cap for England while at Warrington in 1929 against Other Nationalities, and won a cap for Great Britain while at Warrington in 1930 against Australia, playing on the wing in the 4th Ashe test of the 1929–30 Kangaroo tour. Blinkhorn played in Warrington's 17-21 defeat by Huddersfield in the 1933 Challenge Cup Final during the 1932–33 season at Wembley Stadium, London on Saturday 6 May 1933, in front of a crowd of 41,784. he made his début for Broughton Rangers as a fullback against Hull Kingston Rovers at Belle Vue Stadium, Belle Vue, Manchester.
