= Harry Beverley =

Harry Beverley may refer to:

- Harry Beverley (rugby league, born 1907) (1907–1982), English rugby league footballer who played in the 1930s and 1940s, and coached in the 1950s and 1960s
- Harry Beverley (rugby league, born 1947) (1947–2022), English rugby league footballer who played in the 1970s and 1980s
