= Harold Ellerington =

GB & England international rugby league footballer

Personal information
- Full name: Harold Ellerington
- Born: c. 1912 Sculcoates district, England
- Died: 1986 (aged 74)

Playing information
- Position: Fullback, Wing, Centre, Stand-off, Scrum-half, Prop, Loose forward
Club
| Years | Team | Pld | T | G | FG | P |
|---|---|---|---|---|---|---|
| 1930–42 | Hull F.C. | 268 | 52 (51?) | 2 |
Representative
| Years | Team | Pld | T | G | FG | P |
| | Yorkshire | ≥1 |
| 1938–39 | England | 2 | 0 | 0 | 0 | 0 |
| ≤1936–≥36 | Great Britain | 0 |

Harold Ellerington (c. 1912 – 1986), also known by the nickname of "Elmo", was an English professional rugby league footballer who played in the 1930s and 1940s. He played at representative level for Great Britain (non-Test matches), England and Yorkshire, and at club level for Hull F.C., as a fullback, wing, centre, stand-off, scrum-half, prop or loose forward, and was captain of Hull during the 1936–37, 1937–38 and 1938–39 seasons. His leg was amputatated following a railway accident during World War II, following which he became a director, and board member at Hull F.C.

== Background ==
His birth was registered in Sculcoates district, Kingston upon Hull, East Riding of Yorkshire, England.

== Playing career ==
=== Championship final appearances ===
Ellerington was away on the 1936 Great Britain Lions tour, and so didn't play in Hull F.C.'s 21–2 victory over Widnes in the Rugby Football League Championship Final during the 1935–36 season, he received a winners medal for his 31-appearances that season.

=== County Cup Final appearances ===
Ellerington played loose forward, was captain and man of the match in Hull F.C.'s 10–18 defeat by Huddersfield in the 1938–39 Yorkshire Cup Final during the 1938–39 season at Odsal Stadium, Bradford on Saturday 22 October 1938, in front of a crowd of 28,714.

=== Representative honours ===
Ellerington won caps for England while at Hull in 1938 against France, and in 1939 against France.

Ellerington was selected for Great Britain while at Hull for the 1936 Great Britain Lions tour of Australia and New Zealand, he was the understudy at Loose forward to Harry Beverley on the tour, and he played in 11 of the non-Test matches.

Ellerington represented Yorkshire while at Hull.
