= 1935–36 Lancashire Cup =

- Structure: Regional knockout championship
- Teams: 14
- Winners: Salford
- Runners-up: Wigan

1935–36 was the twenty-eighth occasion on which the Lancashire Cup completion had been held.
Salford won the trophy by beating Wigan by 15–7.
The match was played at Wilderspool, Warrington, now in the County Palatine of Chester but (historically in the county of Lancashire. The attendance was 16,500 and receipts were £950.
This was the second of the three consecutive Lancashire Cup finals in which Salford would beat Wigan.

== Background ==
The number of teams entering this year's competition was increased by one with the addition of Streatham & Mitcham (hardly a Lancashire club, but useful to make the numbers up). This brought the number up to 14 and the same fixture format was retained. There was now no need for a bye in the first round, but there was still a "blank" or "dummy" fixture. The bye in the second round remained.

== Competition and results ==
=== Round 1 ===
Involved 7 matches (with one "blank" fixture) and 14 clubs

Game No	Fixture date	Home team	Score	Away team	Venue	Att	Rec	Notes	Ref
1	Wed 11 Sep 1935	St. Helens	10–7	Streatham & Mitcham	Knowsley Road			1	
2	Sat 14 Sep 1935	Leigh	5–2	Broughton Rangers	Mather Lane				
3	Sat 14 Sep 1935	St Helens Recs	17–5	Barrow	City Road				
4	Sat 14 Sep 1935	Liverpool Stanley	7–14	Salford	Stanley Greyhound Stadium				
5	Sat 14 Sep 1935	Rochdale Hornets	5–7	Oldham	Athletic Grounds				
6	Sat 14 Sep 1935	Swinton	2–2	Warrington	Station Road				
7	Sat 14 Sep 1935	Wigan	6–5	Widnes	Central Park				
8		blank		blank					

=== Round 1 – replays ===
Involved 1 match

Game No	Fixture date	Home team	Score	Away team	Venue	Att	Rec	Notes	Ref
1	Wed 18 Sep 1935	Warrington	14–8	Swinton	Wilderspool				

=== Round 2 – quarterfinals ===
Involved 3 matches (with one bye) and 7 clubs

Game No	Fixture date	Home team	Score	Away team	Venue	Att	Rec	Notes	Ref
1	Wed 25 Sep 1935	St. Helens	2–2	St Helens Recs	Knowsley Road				
2	Wed 25 Sep 1935	Salford	11–0	Warrington	The Willows				
3	Wed 25 Sep 1935	Wigan	16–7	Leigh	Central Park				
4		Oldham		bye					

=== Round 2 – quarterfinals – first replays ===
Involved 1 match

Game No	Fixture date	Home team	Score	Away team	Venue	Att	Rec	Notes	Ref
1	Mon 31 Sep 1935	St Helens Recs	8–21	St. Helens	City Road				

div>

=== Round 3 – semifinals ===
Involved 2 matches and 4 clubs

Game No	Fixture date	Home team	Score	Away team	Venue	Att	Rec	Notes	Ref
1	Wed 2 Oct 1935	Wigan	9–4	Oldham	Central Park				
2	Wed 9 Oct 1935	Salford	19–6	St. Helens	The Willows				

=== Final ===
Game No	Fixture date	Home team	Score	Away team	Venue	Att	Rec	Notes	Ref
	Saturday 19 October 1935	Salford	15–7	Wigan	Wilderspool	16,500	£950	2	

==== Teams and scorers ====
Salford	No.	Wigan
	teams	
Harold Osbaldestin	1	Jim Sullivan
Bob Brown	2	Jack Morley
Sammy Miller	3	Gordon Innes
Gus Risman	4	Gwyn Davies
Barney Hudson	5	Alf Ellaby
Billy Watkins	6	George Bennett
Emlyn Jenkins	7	Hector Gee
Billy Williams	8	Harold Edwards
Bert Day	9	Albert Davis
Joe Bradbury	10	Ken Gee
Paddy Dalton	11	Len Mason
Alf Middleton	12	Billy Hall
Jack Feetham	13	Charlie Seeling
15	score	7
10	HT	7
	Scorers	
	Tries	
Joe Bradbury	T	Gwyn Davies (1)
Alf Middleton	T	
Jack Feetham	T	
	Goals	
Gus Risman (3)	G	Jim Sullivan (2)
	G	
	Drop Goals	
	DG	
Referee		Alf Hill (Leeds)

Scoring – Try = three (3) points – Goal = two (2) points – Drop goal = two (2) points

=== The road to success ===
First round
Liverpool Stanley	7
Salford	14
Swinton	2–8
Warrington	2–14
St. Helens	10
Streatham & Mitcham	7
St Helens Recs	17
Barrow	5
Wigan	6
Widnes	5
Leigh	5
Broughton Rangers	2
Rochdale Hornets	5
Oldham	7
blank
blank

Second round
Salford	11
Warrington	0
St. Helens	2–21
St Helens Recs	2–8
Wigan	15
Leigh	7
Oldham
bye

Semifinals
Salford	19
St. Helens	6
Wigan	9
Oldham	4

Final
Salford	15
Wigan	7

== Notes and comments ==
1 * First Lancashire Cup match by new London club Streatham & Mitcham

2 * Wilderspool was the home ground of Warrington from 1883 to the end of the 2003 Summer season when they moved into the new purpose built Halliwell Jones Stadium. Wilderspool remained as a sports/Ruugby League ground and is/was used by Woolston Rovers/Warrington Wizards junior club. The ground had a final capacity of 9,000 although the record attendance was set in a Challenge cup third round match on 13 March 1948 when 34,304 spectators saw Warrington lose to Wigan 10–13.

== See also ==
- 1935–36 Northern Rugby Football League season
- Rugby league county cups
