= Alf Peacock =

England international rugby league footballer

Personal information
- Full name: John Alfred Peacock
- Born: 7 February 1891 Runcorn, Cheshire, England
- Died: unknown

Playing information
- Position: Forward, Hooker
Club
Years	Team	Pld	T	G	FG	P
1909–15	Runcorn RFC	118	5	0	0	15
1919–29	Warrington	367	10	0	0	30
	Total	485	15	0	0	45
Representative
Years	Team	Pld	T	G	FG	P
1925	Lancashire	1	0	0	0	0
1925	England	1	0	0	0	0

John Alfred Peacock (7 February 1891 – death unknown) was an English professional rugby league footballer who played in the 1900s, 1910s and 1920s. He played at representative level for England and Lancashire, and at club level for Runcorn RFC and Warrington, initially as a forward, and then as a specialist hooker.

== Playing career ==
=== International honours ===
Alf Peacock won a cap for England while at Warrington in 18-14 victory over Wales at Central Park, Wigan on Wednesday 30 September 1925, in front of a crowd of 12,000.

Alf Peacock played hooker for "The Whites" in the 38-15 victory over "The Reds" in a trial match for the 1924 Great Britain Lions tour of Australia and New Zealand trial match at Central Park, Wigan on Wednesday 20 February 1924, in front of a crowd of 15,000, but ultimately, he was not selected for Great Britain.

=== County honours ===
Alf Peacock won a cap for Lancashire while at Warrington in the 6-5 victory over Cumberland at the Recreation Ground, Whitehaven on Saturday 26 September 1925, in front of a crowd of 6,000.

=== Championship final appearances ===
Alf Peacock played hooker, and scored a try in Warrington's 10-22 defeat by Wigan in the Championship Final during the 1925–26 season at Knowsley Road, St. Helens on Saturday 8 May 1926, in front of a crowd of 20,000.

=== Challenge Cup Final appearances ===
Alf Peacock played hooker in Warrington's 3-5 defeat by Swinton in the 1927–28 Challenge Cup Final during the 1927–28 season at Central Park, Wigan on Saturday 14 April 1928, in front of a crowd of 33,909.

=== County Cup Final appearances ===
Alf Peacock played hooker in Warrington's 7-5 victory over Oldham in the 1921 Lancashire Cup Final during the 1921–22 season at The Cliff, Broughton, Salford on Saturday 3 December 1921, in front of a crowd of 18,000, and played hooker in the 15-2 victory over Salford in the 1929 Lancashire Cup Final during the 1929–30 season at Central Park, Wigan on Saturday 23 November 1929, in front of a crowd of 21,012.

=== Club career ===
Following the disbandment of Runcorn RFC in 1918, Alf Peacock joined Warrington for a signing-on fee of £7 10s 0d (based on increases in average earnings, this would be approximately £1,482 in 2017), he made his début for Warrington against Oldham at Wilderspool Stadium, Warrington on Saturday 23 August 1919, he was Warrington's first specialist hooker, and wore a scrum cap whilst playing, he played in all of Warrington's 41-matches during the 1926–27 season, and he played his last match for Warrington on Saturday 23 November 1929.

== Honours ==
Peacock was inducted into Warrington's Hall of Fame in 2013.
