= Jesse Meredith =

Wales international rugby league & union footballer

Personal information
- Full name: Jesse Oswald Meredith
- Born: 1 April 1906 Bedwellty district, Wales
- Died: November 1974 (aged 68) Liverpool, England

Playing information

Rugby union
Club
Years	Team	Pld	T	G	FG	P
≤1927–27	Abertillery RFC

Rugby league
- Position: Centre
Club
Years	Team	Pld	T	G	FG	P
1927–31	Warrington	113	9	1	1	31
Representative
Years	Team	Pld	T	G	FG	P
1930	Wales	1	0	0	0	0

Jesse Oswald Meredith (1 April 1906 – November 1974) was a Welsh rugby union and professional rugby league footballer who played in the 1920s and 1930s. He played club level rugby union (RU) for Abertillery RFC, and representative level rugby league (RL) for Wales, and at club level for Warrington, as a centre.

== Background ==
Jesse Meredith's birth was registered in Bedwellty district, Wales, and his death aged 68 was registered Liverpool district, Merseyside, England.

== Playing career ==
=== International honours ===
Jesse Meredith won a cap for Wales while at Warrington in 1930.

=== Challenge Cup Final appearances ===
Jesse Meredith played at centre in Warrington's 3–5 defeat by Swinton in the 1927–28 Challenge Cup Final during the 1927–28 season at Central Park, Wigan, in front of a crowd of 33,909.

=== County Cup Final appearances ===
Jesse Meredith played, and scored a try in Warrington's 15–2 victory over Salford in the 1929–30 Lancashire Cup Final during the 1929–30 season at Central Park, Wigan on Saturday 23 November 1929.

=== Club career ===
Jesse Meredith made his début for Warrington on Monday 17 October 1927, and he played his last match for Warrington on Saturday 25 April 1931.
