= Bob Bradbury =

English rugby league footballer

Personal information
- Full name: James Robert Bradbury

Playing information
- Position: Wing
Club
Years	Team	Pld	T	G	FG	P
1920–22	Warrington	57	19	0	0	57

Bob Bradbury was a professional rugby league footballer who played in the 1920s. He played at club level for Warrington as a wing.

== Playing career ==
=== County Cup Final appearances ===
Bob Bradbury played on the wing, and scored the only try in Warrington's 7-5 victory over Oldham in the 1921 Lancashire Cup Final during the 1921–22 season at The Cliff, Broughton, Salford on Saturday 3 December 1921, in front of a crowd of 18,000.

=== Club career ===
Bob Bradbury made his début for Warrington on 27 November 1920, and he played his last match for Warrington on 7 October 1922.
