= Billy Kirk =

England international rugby league footballer

Personal information
- Full name: William Kirk
- Born: 7 April 1909 Wigan, Greater Manchester, England
- Died: 1997 (aged 87–88) Wigan, Greater Manchester, England

Playing information
- Position: Scrum-half
Club
Years	Team	Pld	T	G	FG	P
1927–34	Warrington	102	16	0	0	48
1934–36	Liverpool Stanley	61	9	0	0	27
	Total	163	25	0	0	75
Representative
Years	Team	Pld	T	G	FG	P
1930	England	1	0	0	0	0
1930	Lancashire	2	1	0	0	3

William Kirk (17 April 1909 - 1997) was an English professional rugby league footballer who played in the 1920s and 1930s. He played at representative level for England, and at club level for Warrington, as a scrum-half.

== Playing career ==
=== Club career ===
Kirk played scrum-half, and was carried off injured (before the era before of the interchange/substitute) in Warrington's 3-5 defeat by Swinton in the 1928 Challenge Cup Final during the 1927–28 season at Central Park, Wigan, in front of a crowd of 33,909.

Kirk played, and scored a try in Warrington's 15-2 victory over Salford in the 1929 Lancashire Cup Final during the 1929–30 season at Central Park, Wigan on Saturday 23 November 1929.

=== International honours ===
Kirk won a cap for England while at Warrington in 1930 against Other Nationalities.
