= Geoff Fletcher =

English rugby league footballer and coach

Personal information
- Born: 10 December 1943
- Died: 9 November 2017 (aged 73) Holme Farm, St Helens, England

Playing information
Club
Years	Team	Pld	T	G	FG	P
1962–65	Leigh (Note: statistics are a total of all three spells at club)	154	11	0	0	33
1965–69	Oldham	107+4	13	1	0	41
1969–72	Wigan	98	12	0	0	36
1972–73	Leigh
1973–75	Wigan	31	3	0	0	9
1975–77	Leigh
1977	Workington Town	15	2	0	0	6
1977–84	Huyton	113+6	6	4	0	28
1984–85	Runcorn Highfield	10+4	1	0	0	4
	Total	542	48	5	0	157
Representative
Years	Team	Pld	T	G	FG	P
1968–69	Lancashire	3	1	0	0	3

Coaching information
Club
Years	Team	Gms	W	D	L	W%
1977–86	Huyton/Runcorn Highfield
1989	Runcorn Highfield
	Total	0	0	0	0

Geoff Fletcher (10 December 1943 – 9 November 2017) was a professional rugby league footballer, coach and chairman. Fletcher in his younger years played for Thatto Heath and later with Pilkington Recs where he played as a back and also as a winger. He later turned professional with Leigh. Geoff Fletcher also had stints with Oldham, Wigan and Workington Town. He joined Huyton in 1978 and went on to become player / coach and later manager. He died in November 2017, aged 74.

== Playing career ==
=== County Cup Final appearances ===
Fletcher played right-prop in Oldham's 13–16 defeat by Wigan in the 1966 Lancashire Cup Final during the 1966–67 season at Station Road, Swinton on Saturday 29 October 1966, played left-prop (replaced by substitute Dennis Maders) in the 2–30 defeat by St Helens in the 1968 Lancashire Cup Final during the 1968–69 season at Central Park, Wigan on Friday 25 October 1968, and played left-prop, and scored in Wigan's 15–8 victory over Widnes in the 1971 Lancashire Cup Final during the 1971–72 season at Knowsley Road, St. Helens on Saturday 28 August 1971.

== Coaching career and chairmanship ==
Fletcher joined Huyton as player-coach in August 1977. He stayed on as coach after his playing career was over and eventually became the club's chairman. Fletcher remained involved with the club until its demise as Prescot Panthers in 1997.

== Personal life ==
In addition to his rugby career, Fletcher owned a pig farm situated close to St Helens former ground, Knowsley Road. He was the son of the rugby league footballer who played in the 1930s for St Helens R.F.C.; Bill Fletcher.
