= Jack Prescott (rugby league) =

English rugby league footballer

Personal information
- Full name: John Harrison Prescott
- Born: 11 September 1890 Wigan, England
- Died: July 1989 (aged 98)

Playing information
- Position: Centre, Stand-off, Scrum-half
Club
Years	Team	Pld	T	G	FG	P
1908–13	Wigan	44	15	15	0	75
1913–15	Hull Kingston Rovers	39	10	0	0	30
1920–21	Warrington	50	7	0	0	21
	Total	133	32	15	0	126
- Military career
- Allegiance: United Kingdom
- Branch: British Army
- Service years: 1915-19
- Unit: Royal Engineers
- Conflicts: World War I

John Harrison Prescott (11 September 1890 – 1989) was an English professional rugby league footballer who played in the 1900s, 1910s and 1920s. He played at club level for Wigan, Hull Kingston Rovers and Warrington (captain), as an occasional goal-kicking centre, stand-off or scrum-half.

== Background ==
John Harrison Prescott a.k.a. Jack Prescott was born on 11 September 1890 at 2 Prescott's Yard, Wigan, Lancashire, England, he served with the Royal Engineers during World War I from 1915 to 1919.

== Playing career ==
=== Championship final appearances ===
Jack Prescott played in Wigan's victory as league leaders in the Championship during the 1908–09 season.

=== County League appearances ===
Jack Prescott played in Wigan's victories in the Lancashire County League during the 1908–09 season, 1910–11 season, 1911–12 season, 1912–13 season and 1913–14 season.

=== County Cup Final appearances ===
Jack Prescott played stand-off, and was captain in Warrington's 7-5 victory over Oldham in the 1921–22 Lancashire Cup Final during the 1921–22 season at The Cliff, Broughton, Salford on Saturday 3 December 1921, in front of a crowd of 18,000.

=== Club career ===
Jack Prescott made his début for Wigan in the 56-0 victory over Aberdare RLFC at Ynys Field, Aberdare on Saturday 5 September 1908, he scored his first try for Wigan on his début, he scored his last try for Wigan in the 24-8 victory over Oldham in the Lancashire County Cup second-round match at Central Park, Wigan on Saturday 2 November 1912, he played his last match for Wigan in the 13-2 victory over Runcorn RFC in the 1914 Challenge Cup second-round match at Canal Street, Runcorn on Saturday 14 March 1914, he was transferred from Wigan to Hull Kingston Rovers during May 1914, he was transferred from Hull Kingston Rovers to Warrington, he made his début for Warrington on Saturday 28 August 1920, and he played his last match for Warrington on Tuesday 27 December 1921.
