= Gwyn Davies (rugby) =

GB & Wales international dual-code rugby footballer

Personal information
- Full name: Eiryn Gwyne Davies
- Born: 23 June 1908; Aberkenfig, Wales
- Died: 14 July 1992 (aged 84); Wigan, England

Playing information

Rugby union
- Position: Wing
Club
Years	Team	Pld	T	G	FG	P
≤1928–30	Cardiff RFC
Representative
Years	Team	Pld	T	G	FG	P
1928–30	Wales	3	0	0	0	0

Rugby league
- Position: Centre
Club
Years	Team	Pld	T	G	FG	P
1930–39	Wigan	300	127			381
Representative
Years	Team	Pld	T	G	FG	P
1932–35	Wales	3
≤1936–≥36	Great Britain	0

Eiryn Gwyne "Gwyn" Davies (23 June 1908 – 14 July 1992) was a Welsh dual-code international rugby union and professional rugby league footballer who played in the 1920s and 1930s. He played representative level rugby union (RU) for Wales, and at club level for Cardiff RFC, as a wing, and representative level rugby league (RL) for Great Britain (non-Test matches), and Wales, and at club level for Wigan, as a centre.

== Background ==
Davies was born in Aberkenfig, Wales, he died aged 84 in Wigan, Greater Manchester, England.

== Playing career ==
=== International honours ===
Gwyn Davies won 3 caps for Wales (RU) in 1932–1935 while at Cardiff RFC in 1928 against France, in 1929 against England, and in 1930 against Scotland, and won 3 caps, all against England, for Wales (RL) while at Wigan.

Gwyn Davies was selected for Great Britain while at Wigan for the 1936 Great Britain Lions tour of Australia and New Zealand.

=== Championship final appearances ===
Gwyn Davies played left-centre and scored a try in Wigan's 15–3 victory over Salford in the Championship Final during the 1933–34 season at Wilderspool Stadium, Warrington on Saturday 28 April 1934 .

=== County Cup Final appearances ===
Gwyn Davies played left-centre and scored a try in Wigan's 7–15 defeat by Salford in the 1935–36 Lancashire Cup Final during the 1935–36 season at Wilderspool Stadium, Warrington on Saturday 19 October 1935, and played left-centre in the 10–7 victory over Salford in the 1938–39 Lancashire Cup Final during the 1938–39 season at Station Road, Swinton, on Saturday 22 October 1938.

=== Notable tour matches ===
Gwyn Davies played left-centre and scored a try in Wigan's 30–27 victory over France at Central Park, Wigan, on Saturday 10 March 1934.

== Note ==
Davies' middle name is stated as Gwyn on rugbyleagueproject.org, scrum.com, and wru.co.uk, stated as Gwynne on wigan.rlfans.com, and stated as Gwyne on freebmd.org.uk.
