= Jack Arkwright =

GB & England international rugby league footballer

Personal information
- Full name: John Arkwright
- Born: 3 December 1902 Sutton, St Helens, Lancashire, England
- Died: 20 January 1990 (aged 87) Knowsley, Merseyside, England

Playing information
- Position: Prop, Second-row
Club
Years	Team	Pld	T	G	FG	P
1928–34	St. Helens	174	39	21	0	159
1934–45	Warrington	164	30	4	0	98
	Total	338	69	25	0	257
Representative
Years	Team	Pld	T	G	FG	P
1932–38	Lancashire	12	2	1	0	8
1933–38	England	5	1	4	0	11
1936–37	Great Britain	6	2	0	0	6
- Relatives: Chris Arkwright (grandson)

John Arkwright (3 December 1902 – 20 January 1990) was an English professional rugby league footballer who played in the 1920s, 1930s and 1940s. He played at representative level for Great Britain England and Lancashire, and at club level for St. Helens and Warrington, as a prop or second-row.

== Playing career ==
=== Club career ===
Arkwright signed for St. Helens for a signing-on fee of £50.

Arkwright played left-second-row in St. Helens' 9–5 victory over Huddersfield in the Championship Final during the 1931–32 season at Belle Vue, Wakefield on Saturday 7 May 1932.

Arkwright played left-second-row in St. Helens' 9–10 defeat by Warrington in the 1932 Lancashire Cup Final during the 1932–33 season at Central Park, Wigan on Saturday 19 November 1932.

Arkwright was transferred from St. Helens to Warrington for a world record transfer fee for a forward of £800 on 1 October 1934, (based on increases in average earnings, this would be approximately £146,100 in 2016).

He made his final appearance for Warrington in 1945, making him the club's oldest player at the age of 42.

=== Representative honours ===
Arkwright, won caps for England while at St Helens in 1933 against Other Nationalities, while at Warrington in 1936 against France, and Wales, in 1937 against France, in 1938 against France, and won caps for Great Britain while at Warrington in 1936 against Australia (2 matches), and New Zealand, and in 1937 against Australia (3 matches). During the 1936 tour Arkwright achieved the unusual distinction of being dismissed twice in one game. Playing against Northern Districts he was dismissed for violent play. The opposing captain, J Kingston, appealed to the referee for Arkwright to continue to play. The referee rescinded the sending off but towards the end of the game dismissed Arkwright again for punching an opponent.

Arkwright played left-prop in Lancashire's 7-5 victory over Australia in the 1937–38 Kangaroo tour match at Wilderspool Stadium, Warrington on Wednesday 29 September 1937, in front of a crowd of 16,250.

== Honoured at St Helens RFC and Warrington RLFC ==
Jack Arkwright is an inductee in both the St Helens RFC Hall of Fame, and the Warrington RLFC Hall of Fame.

== Personal life ==
Jack Arkwright's son, Jack Arkwright Jr., played rugby league for Warrington between 1959 and 1962, and his grandson, Chris Arkwright, played for St Helens in the 1980s.
