= Frank Williams (English rugby league) =

England international rugby league footballer

Personal information
- Full name: Frank Joseph Williams
- Born: 1 January 1902
- Died: 13 December 1964 (aged 62)

Playing information
- Position: Loose forward
Club
Years	Team	Pld	T	G	FG	P
1921–34	Warrington	352	87	0	0	261
Representative
Years	Team	Pld	T	G	FG	P
1927	Lancashire	1	0	0	0	0
1930	England	1	0	0	0	0

Frank Williams (1902 – 1964) was an English professional rugby league footballer who played in the 1920s and 1930s. He played at representative level for England, and at club level for Warrington, as a loose forward.

== Playing career ==
=== Club career ===
Frank Williams made his début for Warrington on Saturday 12 November 1921, and he played his last match for Warrington on Saturday 24 February 1934.

Williams played loose forward in Warrington's 10-22 defeat by Wigan in the Championship Final during the 1925–26 season at Knowsley Road, St. Helens on Saturday 8 May 1926.

Williams played in Warrington's 15-2 victory over Salford in the 1929 Lancashire Cup Final during the 1929–30 season at Central Park, Wigan on Saturday 23 November 1929.

=== International honours ===
Williams won a cap for England while at Warrington in 1930 against Other Nationalities.
