= John Lee (political scientist) =

Australian international affairs researcher

John Lee Cheong Seong
- Born: 1973 (age 52–53); Ipoh, Malaysia
- Occupations: Academia and government

John Lee is an Australian academic and policy expert working on international economic and security affairs with a focus on the Indo-Pacific. Lee was a senior adviser to Australian Foreign Minister Julie Bishop from 2016 to 2018. He was also appointed the government's lead adviser for the 2017 Foreign Policy White Paper to guide Australian external policy for the next decade and beyond. He is a senior fellow at the Hudson Institute in Washington, DC and an adjunct professor and Senior Fellow at the United States Studies Centre at the University of Sydney until 2022. Lee was a board member of the Institute for Regional Security (formerly Kokoda Foundation) from 2012 until August 2016.

== Early life and education ==
Lee was born in Ipoh, Malaysia in 1973. He migrated to Australia with his family in 1979 at the age of six years, first to Newcastle and then Sydney from 1984 onward. After boarding at the Sydney GPS school, St Joseph's College, Hunters Hill and finishing his HSC in 1991, he graduated with degrees in Arts (First Class in Philosophy) and Law from the University of New South Wales and obtained his masters and doctorate in international relations from the University of Oxford whilst on an Oxford Chevening Scholarship.

== Career ==
Lee published a book, Will China fail? - the limits and contradictions of market socialism, in 2007. An updated second edition was released in 2009. The subject of this book is the complexities and risks associated with China's approach to economic development, which Lee asserts to be flawed, unsustainable, dangerously unstable, and unlikely if not incapable of providing a foundation for the continuation of China's 'peaceful rise' or 'peaceful development'. In 2014, he co-authored a report with Paul Dibb titled Why China Will Not Become The Dominant Power in Asia The report rejects the idea that America should step back from the region and treat China as a strategic equal in Asia; that China's military, economic and demographic shortcomings are considerable; that a China-dominated Asian region is unlikely without American strategic withdrawal; and defence planning in Australia should not assume Chinese dominance as inevitable. Lee has also emphasised the importance and desirability of Japanese power for a stable balance in the Indo-Pacific in the current century.

Lee has written extensively on the subject of China's political-economy, foreign policies of the United States, China, Japan, India, Australia and in Southeast Asia, and strategic and economic futures in East Asia. Lee has published more than 300 articles in newspapers, magazines, and journals, including the Wall Street Journal, International Herald Tribune, The Australian, the New York Times, Washington Post, Financial Times, Forbes, The Times of London, The Australian Financial Review, Time, Der Spiegel, South China Morning Post, Global Times, Washington Quarterly, and Newsweek.
