= Billy Belshaw =

GB & England international rugby league footballer

William Belshaw
Personal information
- Full name: William Belshaw
- Born: 20 February 1914; Wigan, England
- Died: 6 December 1975 (aged 61); Wigan, England

Playing information
- Position: Fullback, Centre
Club
Years	Team	Pld	T	G	FG	P
1933–34	London Highfield	41	9	3	0	33
1934–37	Liverpool Stanley	114	17	137	0	325
1937–46	Warrington	132	29	167	5	431
1943–44	Wigan (guest)	51	9	43	0	113
	Bramley
	Total	338	64	350	5	902
Representative
Years	Team	Pld	T	G	FG	P
1935–45	England	11	0	17	0	34
1936–37	Great Britain	8	0	0	0	0
1935–46	Lancashire	12	1	18	0	39

William Belshaw (20 February 1914 – 6 December 1975) was an English professional rugby league footballer who played in the 1930s and 1940s. He played at representative level for Great Britain and England, and at club level for Liverpool Stanley, Warrington and Wigan (World War II guest), as a goal-kicking fullback, or centre.

== Playing career ==
=== Club career ===
At club level, Belshaw played for Liverpool Stanley until 1937, when he was signed by Warrington for a record fee of £1,450. He went on to make 132 appearances for Warrington.

Belshaw also appeared for Wigan as a World War II guest player. He played at centre and scored a goal in Wigan's 13–9 victory over Dewsbury in the Championship Final first-leg during the 1943–44 season at Central Park, Wigan on Saturday 13 May 1944, and played at centre in the 12-5 victory over Dewsbury in the Championship Final second-leg during the 1943–44 season at Crown Flatt, Dewsbury on Saturday 20 May 1944.

He was transferred to Bramley in 1946.

=== Representative honours ===
Billy Belshaw, won caps for England while at Liverpool Stanley in 1935 against Wales, in 1936 against Wales, in 1937 against France, while at Warrington in 1938 against France, and Wales, in 1939 against France, and Wales, in 1940 against Wales, in 1941 against Wales, in 1943 against Wales, in 1945 against Wales, and won caps for Great Britain while at Liverpool Stanley in 1936 against Australia (3 matches), and New Zealand (2 matches), in 1937 against Australia, while at Warrington, and in 1937 against Australia (2 matches).

Billy Belshaw played fullback, and scored 2-goals in Lancashire's 7–5 victory over Australia in the 1937–38 Kangaroo tour match at Wilderspool Stadium, Warrington on Wednesday 29 September 1937, in front of a crowd of 16,250.

=== Other notable matches ===
Billy Belshaw played centre and was captain for a Rugby League XIII against Northern Command XIII at Thrum Hall, Halifax on Saturday 21 March 1942.
