= Jack Miller (rugby league, born 1906) =

English RL coach and former GB & England international rugby league footballer

Personal information
- Born: 10 August 1906 Newton-le-Willows, England
- Died: October 1978 (aged 72)

Playing information
- Height: 5 ft 8 in (1.73 m)
- Weight: 14 st 6 lb (92 kg)
- Position: Prop, Second-row
Club
Years	Team	Pld	T	G	FG	P
1926–46	Warrington	526	31	0	0	93
1941–44	→ Keighley (guest)	33	1	3	0	9
1944–45	→ Huddersfield (guest)	28	2	2	0	10
1946–47	Leigh	25	2	0	0	6
	Total	612	36	5	0	118
Representative
Years	Team	Pld	T	G	FG	P
1926–36	England	4	0	0	0	0
1933–36	Great Britain	6	1	0	0	3
1933–36	Lancashire	3	0	0	0	0

Coaching information
Club
Years	Team	Gms	W	D	L	W%
1948	Leigh	0	0	0	0

Jack Miller (10 August 1906 – October 1978) also known by the nickname of "Cod", due to his profession as a Fishmonger, was an English professional rugby league footballer who played in the 1920s, 1930s and 1940s. He played at representative level for Great Britain and England, and at club level for Warrington, Huddersfield (World War II guest) and Leigh, as a prop, or second-row. Over his 20-year career he made 526 appearances for Warrington, a club record which was broken in 1959 by Brian Bevan.

== Background ==
Jack Miller was born in Newton-le-Willows, Lancashire, England. Jack was married to Margaret who was a model and fashion assistant at Broadbents in Warrington. They had 2 daughters June and Barbara (born 1937) and lived in Grappenhall, Warrington when they were younger.

== Playing career ==
=== Warrington ===
Miller made his début for Warrington on Saturday 11 December 1926, and he played his last match for Warrington on Saturday 9 February 1946.

Miller played in Warrington's 15-2 victory over Salford in the 1929 Lancashire Cup Final during the 1929–30 season at Central Park, Wigan on Sat 23 November 1929, the 10-9 victory over St. Helens in the 1932 Lancashire Cup Final during the 1932–33 season at Central Park, Wigan on Saturday 19 November 1932, and he played at second-row in the 8-4 victory over Barrow in the 1937 Lancashire Cup Final during the 1937–38 season at Central Park, Wigan on Saturday 23 October 1937.

Miller is also a Warrington Wolves Hall of Fame inductee.

=== Challenge Cup Final appearances ===
Jack Miller played at prop in Huddersfield's 13–9 aggregate victory over Bradford Northern in the 1944–45 Challenge Cup Final during the 1944–45 season; the 7-4 victory in the first-leg at Fartown Ground, Huddersfield on Saturday 28 April 1945, and the 6-5 victory in the second-leg at Odsal Stadium, Bradford on Saturday 5 May 1945.

=== Leigh ===
In November 1946, Miller was transferred to Leigh. He made 25 appearances for the club, scoring two tries.

=== International honours ===
Miller won caps for England while at Warrington in 1928 against Wales, in 1933 against Other Nationalities, in 1936 against France, and Wales, and won caps for Great Britain while at Warrington in 1933 against Australia (3 matches), and on the 1936 Great Britain Lions tour against Australia, and New Zealand (2 matches).
