= Harry Woods (rugby league) =

Former GB & England international rugby league footballer

Personal information
- Full name: James Henry Woods
- Born: 3 December 1912; Leigh, England
- Died: 1989; Wigan, England

Playing information
- Position: Prop, Second-row
Club
| Years | Team | Pld | T | G | FG | P |
|---|---|---|---|---|---|---|
| ≤1933–33 | Wigan Highfield |
| 1933–34 | London Highfield |
| 1934–≥36 | Liverpool Stanley |
| ≤1937–≥37 | Leeds |
| 1937–38 | Wigan | 24 | 1 | 0 | 0 | 3 |
| 1939–47 | Leigh | 28 | 2 | 0 | 0 | 6 |
| | Total | 52 | 3 | 0 | 0 | 9 |
Representative
| Years | Team | Pld | T | G | FG | P |
| 1933–37 | Lancashire | 5 | 0 | 0 | 0 | 0 |
| 1935–37 | England | 3 | 0 | 0 | 0 | 0 |
| 1936–37 | Great Britain | 6 | 0 | 0 | 0 | 0 |

James Henry Woods (3 December 1912 – 1989) was an English professional rugby league footballer who played in the 1930s. He played at representative level for Great Britain, England and Lancashire, and at club level for Wigan Highfield, London Highfield, Liverpool Stanley, Leeds, Wigan and Leigh, as a prop or second-row.

== Background ==
Harry Woods was born in Leigh, Lancashire, England.

== Playing career ==
=== International honours ===
Harry Woods, won caps for England while at Liverpool Stanley in 1935 against France, and Wales, while at Leeds in 1937 against France, and won caps for Great Britain while at Liverpool Stanley in 1936 against Australia (3 matches), and New Zealand (2 matches), and while at Leeds in 1937 against Australia.

=== County honours ===
Harry Woods played at second-row in Lancashire's 7-5 victory over Australia in the 1937–38 Kangaroo tour match at Wilderspool Stadium, Warrington on Wednesday 29 September 1937, in front of a crowd of 16,250.

=== County Cup Final appearances ===
Harry Woods played at prop in Leeds' 14-8 victory over Huddersfield in the 1937–38 Yorkshire Cup Final during the 1937–38 season at Belle Vue, Wakefield on Saturday 30 October 1937.
