= Ted O'Loughlin =

Australian gastroenterologist and former rower (born 1952)

Personal information
- Nationality: Australian
- Born: 1952 (age 73–74)
- Education: St Joseph's College, Hunters Hill
- Years active: 1968-74

Sport
- Country: Australia
- Sport: Rowing
- Club: Nepean Rowing Club; Sydney University Boat Club

Achievements and titles
- National finals: King's Cup 1974

Dr. Edward O'Loughlin (born 1952) is an Australian paediatric gastroenterologist and a former national representative rower. As a sweep oarsman he was a 1974 national champion and an Australian representative in the men's eight at the 1974 World Championships. As a physician he has served as Head of Gastroenterology at Westmead Children's Hospital.

== Club and state rowing ==
O'Loughlin was raised in Penrith, New South Wales. His senior schooling was at St Joseph's College Hunters Hill and he made their 2nd VIII in 1968 in the same term he arrived at the college. In 1969 he rowed in the school's 1st VIII. His senior club rowing was from the Nepean Rowing Club and the Sydney University Boat Club and he represented the university in the senior men's eight at the Australian Intervarsity Regattas of 1971 and 1972.

At the Australian Rowing Championships in 1970 he raced in a Nepean four contesting the men's coxless four title. In 1972 he rowed in a Sydney University eight which won the men's junior eight title at the Australian Championships. In 1974 he rowed in SUBC colours in a coxed four which placed second in that championship race.

His state representative debut for New South Wales came in the 1974 men's eight which contested and won the King's Cup at the Interstate Regatta within the Australian Rowing Championships.

== International representative rowing ==
The coach, coxswain and seven members of the victorious 1974 NSW King's Cup crew including O'Loughlin were selected as the Australian men's eight to compete at the 1974 World Rowing Championships in Lucerne. The eight finished in 2nd place in the petite final for an overall eighth placing.

== Medical career ==
O’Loughlin graduated in medicine from Sydney University in 1977. He undertook paediatric training at Sydney's Royal Alexandra Hospital for Children and a Gastrointestinal fellowship in Calgary, Canada. In 2012 he was Westmead Children's Hospital's Head of Gastroenterology.
