= James Tranter =

England international rugby league footballer

Jim Tranter
Personal information
- Full name: James Tranter
- Born: 1890; Warrington, Lancashire, England
- Died: 29 June 1959 (aged 69); Warrington, Lancashire, England

Playing information
- Position: Centre, Second-row, Loose forward
Club
Years	Team	Pld	T	G	FG	P
1911–28	Warrington	439	120	0	6	372
Representative
Years	Team	Pld	T	G	FG	P
1919–25	Lancashire	8	3	0	0	9
1922–23	England	2	0	0	0	0

James Tranter (1890 – 1959) was an English professional rugby league footballer who played in the 1910s and 1920s. He played at representative level for England and Lancashire, and at club level for Warrington, as a centre, second-row or loose forward.

== Playing career ==
=== Club ===
James Tranter made his début for Warrington on Saturday 16 December 1911, and he played his last match for Warrington on Wednesday 26 December 1928.

Jim Tranter played at second-row in Warrington's 10–22 defeat by Wigan in the Championship Final during the 1925–26 season at Knowsley Road, St. Helens on Saturday 8 May 1926.

Jim Tranter is a Warrington Wolves Hall of Fame inductee.

=== International ===
Jim Tranter won caps for England while at Warrington in 1922 against Wales, and in 1923 against Wales.
