= Billy Cunliffe =

English international rugby league footballer

Personal information
- Full name: William Cunliffe
- Born: 1897; Wigan, England
- Died: 10 August 1942 (aged 45); Ince-in-Makerfield, England

Playing information
- Position: Prop
Club
| Years | Team | Pld | T | G | FG | P |
|---|---|---|---|---|---|---|
| 1914–30 | Warrington | 438 | 38 | 6 | 0 | 126 |
| 1930–31 | Broughton Rangers | 2 | 0 | 0 | 0 | 0 |
| | Total | 440 | 38 | 6 | 0 | 126 |
Representative
| Years | Team | Pld | T | G | FG | P |
| 1921–26 | England | 10 | 0 | 0 | 0 | 0 |
| 1920–26 | Great Britain | 11 | 0 | 0 | 0 | 0 |
| 1919–27 | Lancashire | 18 | 1 | 0 | 0 | 3 |

William Cunliffe (1897 – 10 August 1942) was an English professional rugby league footballer who played in the 1910s, 1920s and 1930s. He played at representative level for Great Britain and England, and at club level for Pemberton Rovers ARLFC (in Pemberton, Lancashire), and Warrington, as a prop. Cunliffe is a Warrington Wolves Hall of Fame inductee.

== Background ==
Cunliffe was born in Wigan, Lancashire, England, and he died aged 45 in Ince-in-Makerfield, Lancashire, England.

== Playing career ==
=== International honours ===
Cunliffe was selected to go on the 1920 Great Britain Lions tour and 1924 Great Britain Lions tour of Australia and New Zealand. He won caps for Great Britain while at Warrington in 1920 against Australia, and New Zealand (2 matches), in 1921-22 against Australia (3 matches), in 1924 against Australia (3 matches), and New Zealand, and in 1926 against New Zealand. He also won caps for England while at Warrington in 1921 against Wales, Other Nationalities, and Australia, in 1922 against Wales, in 1923 against Wales (2 matches), in 1925 against Wales (2 matches), in 1926 against Wales, and Other Nationalities.

=== Championship final appearances ===
Cunliffe played at prop in Warrington's 10-22 defeat by Wigan in the Championship Final during the 1925–26 season at Knowsley Road, St. Helens on Saturday 8 May 1926, in front of a crowd of 20,000.

=== Challenge Cup Final appearances ===
Cunliffe played at prop in Warrington's 3-5 defeat by Swinton in the 1927–28 Challenge Cup Final during the 1927–28 season at Central Park, Wigan on Saturday 14 April 1928, in front of a crowd of 33,909.

== Genealogical information ==
Billy Cunliffe was the older brother of the forward for Warrington; Tom Cunliffe, the brothers shared a joint testimonial match in the 1927–28 season.
