= Tommy Flynn =

Wales international rugby league footballer

Personal information
- Full name: Thomas Flynn
- Born: 15 February 1898; Wales
- Died: July 1974 (aged 76); Warrington

Playing information
- Position: Stand-off, Scrum-half
Club
Years	Team	Pld	T	G	FG	P
1922–25	St. Helens	122	38	5	0	124
1925–32	Warrington	224	73	42	7	317
	Total	346	111	47	7	441
Representative
Years	Team	Pld	T	G	FG	P
1927–31	Glamorgan and Monmouthshire	4	1	0	0	3
1931	Wales	1	0	0	0	0

Thomas Flynn (15 February 1898 – July 1974) was a Welsh professional rugby league footballer who played in the 1920s and 1930s. He played at representative level for Wales and Monmouthshire, and at club level for St Helens and Warrington, as a stand-off or scrum-half. He later became the groundsman at Wilderspool Stadium, Warrington.

== Playing career ==
=== International honours ===
Flynn won a cap for Wales while at Warrington in 1931.

=== County honours ===
Tommy Flynn played scrum-half and scored a try in Monmouthshire's 14-18 defeat by Glamorgan in the non-County Championship match during the 1926–27 season at Taff Vale Park, Pontypridd on Saturday 30 April 1927.

=== Championship final appearances ===
Flynn played stand-off in Warrington's 10–22 defeat by Wigan in the Championship Final during the 1925–26 season at Knowsley Road, St. Helens on Saturday 8 May 1926.
