= Arch Crippin =

Australia international rugby league player

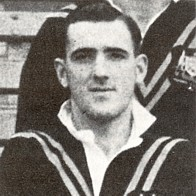

Personal information
- Full name: Archibald James Crippin
- Born: 22 March 1916; Forbes, New South Wales
- Died: 30 March 2008 (aged 92); Forster, New South Wales

Playing information
- Position: Wing
Club
Years	Team	Pld	T	G	FG	P
1936–39	North Sydney	15	12	2	0	40
Representative
Years	Team	Pld	T	G	FG	P
1936	New South Wales	1	2	0	0	6
1936	Australia	3	1	0	0	3

Archibald James Crippin (1916–2008) was an Australian rugby league footballer who played in the 1930s. A New South Wales interstate and Australian international representative winger, he played his whole club career with the North Sydney Bears.

== Early life and club career ==
Originally from Forbes, New South Wales, Crippin moved to Sydney where he attended St. Joseph's College, Hunters Hill for his last two years of school in 1934 & 35. He was a talented sportsman and in his senior year he played in the champions 1st XV, the 1st XI and was in the senior Athletics squad setting a new GPS record in the long jump at the GPS carnival. He was selected to Combined GPS representative sides in cricket, rugby union and athletics. He joined North Sydney Bears in 1936 and played three seasons with them. Such was his talent, he was selected for representative teams in his first year in first grade, although shoulder injuries had virtually ended his career in 1937. He missed the entire 1938 season with injury and made a brief return in 1939, before retiring.

== Representative honours ==
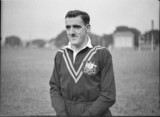
Crippin on debut for Australia 1936

Only one year out of school and aged 19, Crippin was selected in the Kangaroos side to play Great Britain in 1936. He played in all three Tests on the wing outside captain Dave Brown. He marked his arrival with a brilliant 60m try in the second Test but bad-luck struck in the dying stages of the third when an England kick-through bounced back over his head and into the arms of Barney Hudson who scored the series-winning try.

He was selected to play for the 1937-38 Kangaroos but a shoulder dislocation that would sideline a modern-day player for a matter of weeks forced him into early retirement. He is listed on the Australian Players Register as Kangaroo No. 204.

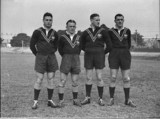
Crippin (r) on debut with Jack Beaton (l)

== War service and later life ==
Crippin served in the 35th Battalion a militia unit, in New Guinea during World War II.

Living to the age of 92, Crippin held the mantle as Australia's oldest living Test player for many years prior to his death. He was honoured in 2006 to present the Australian team with their jumpers before the Anzac Test against New Zealand. He had sixteen great-grandchildren at the time of his death.

=== Sources ===
- Middleton, David Rugby League Yearbook
- Whiticker, Alan & Hudson, Glen (2006) The Encyclopedia of Rugby League Players, Gavin Allen Publishing, Sydney

=== References ===
- Arch Crippin Obituary at Bears Den
- An Unassuming Hero, author Andrew Webster
