= Harry Beverley (rugby league, born 1907) =

English RL coach and former GB & England international rugby league footballer

Personal information
- Full name: Harry Beverley
- Born: third ¼ 1907; Hunslet district, Leeds, England
- Died: 1982 (aged 74–75)

Playing information
- Position: Loose forward
Club
Years	Team	Pld	T	G	FG	P
1927–37	Hunslet	326	79	1	0	239
1937–41	Halifax	112	16	0	0	48
	Total	438	95	1	0	287
Representative
Years	Team	Pld	T	G	FG	P
1929–38	Yorkshire	6	1	0	0	3
1937	British Empire
1935–38	England	5	1	0	0	3
1936–37	Great Britain	6	1	0	0	3

Coaching information
Club
Years	Team	Gms	W	D	L	W%
1949–51	Wakefield Trinity
1962–63	Bradford Northern
	Total	0	0	0	0

Harry Beverley (birth registered third ¼ 1907 – 1982) was an English professional rugby league footballer who played in the 1930s and 1940s, and coached in the 1950s and 1960s. He played at representative level for Great Britain, England, British Empire and Yorkshire, and at club level for Hunslet and Halifax, as a loose forward, and coached at club level for Wakefield Trinity and Bradford Northern.

== Background ==
Beverley's birth was registered in Leeds, West Riding of Yorkshire, England, and he died aged 74–75.

== Playing career ==
=== Hunslet ===
Beverley played loose forward in Hunslet's 11–5 victory over Widnes in the 1933–34 Challenge Cup Final during the 1933–34 season at Wembley Stadium, London on Saturday 5 May 1934.

Beverley played left-centre in Hunslet FC's 7–13 defeat by Hull Kingston Rovers in the 1929–30 Yorkshire Cup Final during the 1929–30 season at Headingley, Leeds on Saturday 30 November 1929, in front of a crowd of 11,000.

=== Halifax ===
Beverley played loose forward and was captain in Halifax's 20–3 victory over Salford in the 1938–39 Challenge Cup Final during the 1938–39 season at Wembley Stadium, London on Saturday 6 May 1939, and played loose forward in Halifax's 2–9 defeat by Leeds in the 1940–41 Challenge Cup Final during the 1940–41 season at Odsal, Bradford, in front of a crowd of 28,500.

=== Representative honours ===
Beverley represented British Empire while at Halifax in 1937 against France, and won caps for England while at Hunslet in 1935 against Wales, in 1936 against France, in 1937 against France, in 1938 against Wales, and France, and won caps for Great Britain while at Hunslet in 1936 against Australia (3 matches), in 1937 against Australia, and while at Halifax in 1937 against Australia (2 matches).

Beverley won caps for Yorkshire while at Halifax.

== Honoured at Halifax ==
Beverley is a Halifax Hall Of Fame Inductee.
