= Liverpool Stanley =

Defunct English rugby league club

Club information
- Founded: 1902; 124 years ago
- Exited: 1997; 29 years ago

Former details
- Ground: Valerie Park, Prescot, 1994–97 Hoghton Road, St. Helens, 1991–94 Canal Street, Runcorn, 1984–91 Alt Park, Huyton, 1969–84 no ground, 1968–69 Knotty Ash Stadium, Liverpool, 1951–68 Stanley Greyhound Stadium, Liverpool, 1934–51 White City Stadium, London, 1933–34 Tunstall Lane, Pemberton, unknown date until 1933

Liverpool Stanley was a semi-professional rugby league club from Liverpool, England. It was renamed Liverpool City in 1951, but was otherwise unrelated to the original Liverpool club of the same name. The club's origins date back to 1880 when it was founded as Wigan Highfield. Although the club was best known for its years in Liverpool, the club relocated numerous times, and were known as London Highfield, Huyton, Runcorn Highfield, Highfield, and eventually Prescot Panthers throughout their existence before being eventually wound up in 1996.

== History ==
=== The first Liverpool City – 1906–1907 ===

A professional club first emerged in Liverpool, called Liverpool City, in 1906, playing at the Stanley Athletics Ground. They hold an unwanted record in the professional game in the United Kingdom as being a team who lost every game in the season. In 1906–1907, they lost 30 games – they drew one against Bramley which was expunged because the return game was not played and also lost to Pontefract, but that result was expunged after Pontefract withdrew from the league. At the end of that season, they were replaced by two Welsh clubs, Merthyr Tydfil and Ebbw Vale.

The Liverpool City name would be resurrected by the Highfield franchise but there is no connection between the two clubs.

=== Wigan Highfield – 1880–1895 and 1902–1933 ===
Highfield Rugby Football Club was formed around 1880 and went out of existence for a few years following the rugby schism of 1895. They reformed in 1902, the club originally playing in a league comprising the "A" teams of the major clubs. Although no colour photographs of the team exist, it is generally assumed that Wigan Highfield's colours were yellow and blue.

Highfield Rugby Football Club played in the Parish of Highfield, in Pemberton, a neighbouring town adjacent to Wigan. In 1921–22, the club made an application for full Rugby League status, but it was decided that their Tunstall Lane ground was not big enough. By incorporating a field, it was possible to increase the size of the ground and in the 1922–23 season the club entered the Rugby League as Wigan Highfield. Their first match was against Wigan on 2 September 1922, at Tunstall Lane, in which Wigan beat Wigan Highfield 25–10.

Highfield generally struggled in the lower half of the league tables but in 1927–1928 they managed to finish above Wigan in 7th place on points percentage. However, in their ten-year existence Wigan Highfield beat Wigan only once, 9–3 at Central Park on 13 September 1930.

In the Challenge Cup, Wigan Highfield's best season was in 1925–1926 when they reached the semi-finals. They saw off Wakefield, Huddersfield and Leeds at Tunstall Lane before losing 15–6 to Oldham in the semi-final at Salford. They also reached the quarter-finals in 1928–1929 but an 8–0 loss away at Castleford denied the chance of all Wigan semi final or final.

In the Lancashire Cup, Wigan Highfield never managed to progress beyond the first round of the competition. They forced replays against Oldham in 1922 and Leigh in 1931 but all in all, the competition was a pretty miserable experience for them.

In 1926, the touring New Zealand Rugby League side visited Tunstall Lane, winning 14–2 in front of approximately 2,000 spectators.

=== London Highfield – 1933 ===
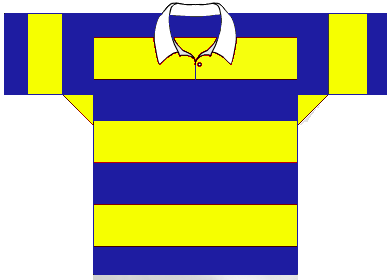
London Highfield's jersey

In 1932, Leeds played Wigan in an exhibition match at the White City Stadium in west London under floodlights. The owner of the stadium, Brigadier-General A C Critchley, was impressed enough to take over Wigan Highfield, who had finished second from bottom in the league, and agreed to pay off their debts. He moved the club to White City and renamed the club London Highfield. The club's old Tunstall Lane ground was sold off for housing.

Highfield's first home game on 20 September 1933 was against Wakefield Trinity in front of a crowd of around 6,000 spectators, which they lost narrowly 9 points to 8. Overall London Highfield played 38 games and finished in 14th position on the table that year, having won 20 games and lost 18. During the season, Highfield also played a match against the touring Australians, who won 20 points to 5 in front of a crowd of 10,500 spectators, which was also London Highfield's highest attendance for the season.

Despite this reasonable success, the White City Company deemed the venture unprofitable and decided not to continue with rugby league beyond the first season. Player's match fees and expenses, plus compensating other team's travel costs contributed largely to the club's loss that year of £8,000.

=== Liverpool Stanley – 1934–1950 and the second Liverpool City – 1951–1968 ===
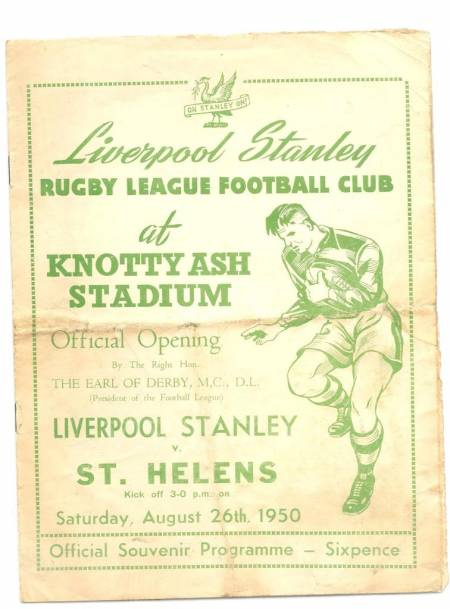

In 1934, Highfield returned north to the Stanley greyhound stadium in Liverpool and became Liverpool Stanley. Liverpool Stanley's colours were distinct yellow jerseys with a blue band around the midriff and also on the sleeves. However, later in their career, due to acute money shortages, the club relied upon handouts and donations, most notably from Mrs Rose Kyle and clothing coupons from supporters. During this period, the kit colours and designs varied drastically, including all-white shirts with black trim, white shirts with black Vs, and an all-blue kit. During their final season as Liverpool Stanley, the club turned out in a white shirt with 'Corporation Green' band around the waist, the same colours they would wear later when they became Liverpool City RLFC.

In 1935–36, Stanley won the Lancashire League. During the Second World War, Liverpool Stanley continued playing, but in 1942 they dropped out, returning after the war in 1945–46.

For the start of the 1950–51 season, the club moved to Mill Yard, Knotty Ash and was renamed Liverpool City RLFC. City developed the Knotty Ash stadium within their meagre means, mainly by fencing it and erecting a small grandstand. The club jersey at that time was green and white hoops (similar to Glasgow Celtic FC), with white shorts and green and white hooped socks. The white jersey with a broad green chest band was adopted at the start of the 1954-55 season.

In 1956, they hosted the touring Australian national team, losing 40–12 in front of a crowd of over 4,700.

=== Huyton – 1968–1984 ===
In July 1964, the club's board were informed by the Carmelite convent that owned the land that their lease on Knotty Ash would not be renewed. Negotiations then took place with nearby Huyton local authority for a 21-year lease at the new Alt Park Ground. With Alt Park not ready, Huyton spent their first year of existence as homeless nomads. Most home matches were played at Widnes. Alt Park was eventually ready in August 1969. It was of a poor standard and often suffered from vandalism.

During their tenure as Huyton RLFC the club's colours were primarily amber shirts with a red and black V and black shorts. In the latter part of the 1970s, the colours changed to red shirts with blue shorts and white socks for a brief period, and eventually an all-black shirt with red collar, white shorts and red socks.

It was during this period that club diehard Geoff Fletcher joined Huyton in 1978. Fletcher would remain with the club as player-coach and then subsequently through their various changes as manager in later years.

The club continued as Huyton RLFC and struggled in the second division until 1985, when the club moved to Runcorn FC's Canal Street Ground in Runcorn after Alt Park's main stand was declared unsafe. The club then became known as Runcorn Highfield.

=== Runcorn Highfield – 1984–1990 ===
Runcorn Highfield
Club information
- Full name: Runcorn Highfield RLFC
- Exited: 1997

Former details
- Ground: Canal Street ground (3,500 (1,800 seated))
- Competition: Rugby League Division 2

Uniforms
Home colours

Around the time of Huyton's proposed move to Runcorn, the then tenants of the Canal Street ground, Runcorn FC, and its board of directors had mooted the idea of gaining extra income by establishing a rugby league club. That year saw applications from new clubs Mansfield Marksman and Sheffield Eagles. When these clubs were elected into the Rugby Football League, Runcorn FC withdrew its application and decided to allow Huyton RLFC to move to their ground instead. Geoff Fletcher remained on initially as player-manager, and then moved unto a role on the board of directors when he retired from playing.

As Runcorn Highfield represented the new towns of Runcorn and Halton, the club adopted the green and yellow colours of the football club as well. The first game Highfield played was an exhibition game against local rivals Widnes. They lost 40–8. Much of their tenure at Runcorn was generally unsuccessful and they drew little local support which was a contributing factor to their eventual departure from Canal Street.

Bill Ashurst coached Runcorn between 1987 and 1989. When Runcorn Highfield drew Wigan at home in the John Player Trophy on 13 November 1988, the club's supporters saw it as an ideal opportunity to persuade the people of Runcorn to come and give Highfield a try. However, the directors had the game switched to Central Park in exchange for a fee from Wigan, on the grounds that Canal Street did not have the capacity.

The players, seeing that the club would receive more money, asked for a greater share. However the directors refused, leading to a massed players' strike. The team that faced Wigan comprised a number of trialists and reserves together with the coach, Bill Ashurst, who had come out of retirement. Highfield lost 92–2 in front of a crowd of 7,233 at Central Park and Ashurst was sent off after 11 minutes. The club never seemed to recover from this blow, and they went on to lose every game in the 1989–90 season, finishing eight points behind second bottom club Nottingham City. Dave Chisnall became head coach of Runcorn in June 1989, he quit in October 1990 after losing all his 38 games in charge.

When Runcorn Football Club increased the rent for Canal Street, Runcorn Highfield signed a 99-year agreement with St Helens Town FC in August 1990 and moved to Hoghton Road, Sutton. The move was opposed by St Helens R.F.C. and the Rugby League Board but approved by the full Rugby League Council by 26 votes to 6 on 5 October 1990.

The club was renamed Highfield for the 1991–92 season. On 3 February 1991, the club ended a 61-game losing streak when they drew with Carlisle 12-12. On 3 March 1991, Highfield defeated Dewsbury to end a 75-game winless streak which stretched back to November 1988. Highfield's playing colours were a representative combination of the past incarnations of the club, which consisted of yellow socks, black shorts and predominantly red shirts with yellow, blue and green stripes across the shoulders and sleeves.

==== Players of Note ====
Paul Woods was a Welsh rugby union and league player, who turned out for Runcorn Highfield towards the end of his career.
Robin Whitfield who, after completing his playing career, became a top class referee
Geoff Fletcher who went from player to coach to manager to board member
Bill Ashurst was a player coach, another who completed his playing days with Runcorn Highfield
Eric Prescott Ex Sthelens, Salford, Widnes player, another who finished his career at Runcorn Highfield

=== Highfield – 1991–1996 ===
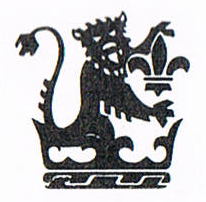
Highfield RLFC club logo

In their first season, Highfield finished 14th out of 20 clubs in Division Two, and reached the second round of the Challenge Cup. Two years later they managed 11th place, above such teams as Fulham, Huddersfield, Workington Town and Keighley. However, Highfield only had an average attendance of 331, rising to 515 the following season.

Chief Executive Maurice Lindsay wanted to reduce the number of clubs in the lower division of the league in 1993. The three clubs finishing bottom of the second division would be demoted to the National Conference League. It went to the wire with Blackpool and Nottingham City already relegated, the crucial last match at Nottingham on 12 April 1993, between Nottingham City and Highfield saw Highfield, under Geoff Fletcher, win 39–6 and Highfield survived at the expense of Chorley Borough.

The 1994–95 season was a disaster for Highfield. They won only two games all season – against amateurs Ovenden 12–6 in the first round of the Regal Trophy and against Barrow 14–12 in the league. They lost to amateurs Beverley 27–4 in the Challenge Cup and their final game (played at Rochdale Hornets' ground on 23 April 1995) was a humiliating 104–4 defeat by Keighley. Their final home game was on 17 April 1995 when they lost 34–8 to Barrow in front of a crowd of 195. Needless to say they finished bottom of the Second Division with only two points. They conceded a grand total of 1,604 points in 30 league games.

Despite all this, Highfield survived into the Super League era but fared even worse in the 1995–96 season, gaining just 1 point all season (a 24–24 draw against York), their only win coming against amateurs Hemel Hempstead in the first round of the Regal Trophy. Their final game was an 82–0 defeat away at Hunslet Hawks on 21 January 1996.

=== Prescot Panthers – 1996–97 ===
Highfield moved to Valerie Park in Prescot during the 1994–1995 season, a move that was made due to the landlords of Hoghton Road, St Helens Town FC deciding to increase the rent on the ground. Highfield RLFC played there until the start of the 1996 season, when they were then renamed Prescot Panthers to coincide with the start of the Super League. As the Prescot Panthers the club colours were predominantly black shirts with gold checks and band across the shoulders and sleeves, black shorts and black/gold hooped socks. They enjoyed by their standards a comparatively successful season winning two games. They struggled on for the 1997 season again winning two games but bowed to the inevitable and resigned from the league at the end of the season. Ironically the club's final game was a 72–10 defeat by Carlisle, who were also playing their final league game. Prescot finished at the bottom for a fifth successive season.

A brewery loan which had kept the club afloat both at Sutton (Highfield) and later on at Prescot changed hands and the new creditors wanted the loan to be repaid immediately. With this loan, Geoff Fletcher had managed to sustain a social club at Valerie Park which provided the club with a small but sufficient income. When the brewery loan was recalled, the Prescot Panthers went into administration and then ultimately receivership.

Chairman Geoff Fletcher accepted a one-off payment of about £30,000 for the club to resign from the Rugby Football League. Equitable payments were then made from the £30,000 to the club's bankers and also to the few remaining Huyton-with-Roby RLFC Ltd Co. shareholders.

==== Seasons ====
Season	League									Play-offs	Challenge Cup
Season	Division	P	W	D	L	F	A	Pts	Pos	Play-offs	Challenge Cup
1996	Division Two	22	2	0	20	301	883	4	12th	Did not qualify	R3
1997	Division Two	20	2	0	18	247	817	4	11th	Did not qualify	Did not enter

== Former players ==
=== Players earning international caps while at Wigan Highfield and Liverpool Stanley ===
- Raymond "Ray" Ashby won caps for Great Britain while at Liverpool City 1964 France
- Gordon A. Aspinall won caps for England while at Liverpool Stanley 1943 Wales
- William "Billy" Belshaw won caps for England while at Liverpool Stanley 1935 Wales, 1936 Wales, 1937 France, while at Warrington 1938 France, Wales, 1939 France, Wales, 1940 Wales, 1941 Wales, 1943 Wales, 1945 Wales, and won caps for Great Britain while at Liverpool Stanley 1936 Australia (3 matches), New Zealand (2 matches), 1937 Australia, while at Warrington 1937 Australia (2 matches)
- Nathan "Nat" Bentham won caps for England while at Wigan Highfield 1928 Wales (2 matches), while at Halifax 1929 Other Nationalities, while at Warrington 1930 Other Nationalities (2 matches), and won caps for Great Britain while at Wigan Highfield 1928 Australia (3 matches), New Zealand (3 matches), while at Halifax 1929–30 Australia (2 matches), while at Warrington Australia (2 matches)
- Harry Woods won caps for England while at Liverpool Stanley and the second Liverpool City 1935 France, Wales, while at Leeds 1937 France won caps, and won caps for Great Britain while at Liverpool Stanley 1936 Australia (3 matches), New Zealand (2 matches), Leeds 1937 Australia

== Honours ==
- Lancashire League: 1
  - 1935-36
