= Grahame's Corner =

Heritage-listed building in Sydney, Australia

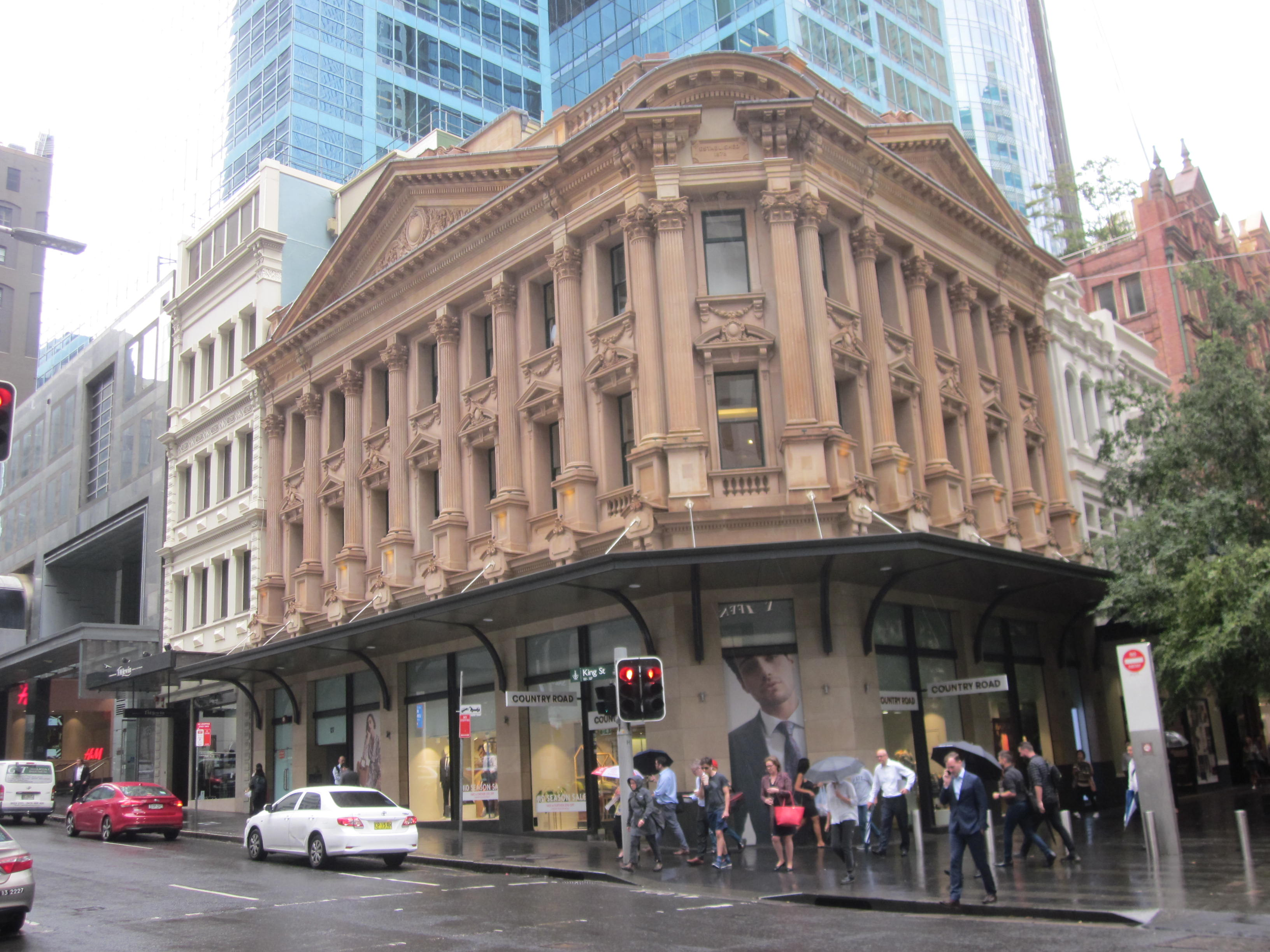
- Grahame's Corner, 142-144 Pitt Street, Sydney.

- Location within Sydney Location within Australia
- 33.8691°S 151.2085°E
- Location: 142-144 Pitt Street, Sydney central business district, City of Sydney, New South Wales, Australia

History
- Built: 1877–1882

Site notes
- Architect: G. A. Morell
- Architectural style: Victorian Free Classical

New South Wales Heritage Register
- Official name: Grahame's Corner; Grahams Corner; AMFIS Building
- Type: State heritage (built)
- Designated: 2 April 1999
- Reference no.: 736
- Type: Insurance company/building
- Category: Commercial

Grahame's Corner is a heritage-listed commercial and office building located at 142-144 Pitt Street, in the Sydney central business district, in New South Wales, Australia. It was designed by G. A. Morell and built from 1877 to 1882. It is also known as Grahams Corner and the AMFIS Building. The property was added to the New South Wales State Heritage Register on 2 April 1999.

== History ==
=== Australian Mutual Fire Insurance Society head office ===
The Australian Mutual Fire Insurance Society was formed in 1871. Within six years the Society had developed to the point where it was able to buy a site on the corner of Pitt and King Streets (then occupied by the Surry Arms Hotel) and construct its Head Office building in a key position in Sydney's growing central business district. The building was designed by G. A. Morell as an elaborately decorated, five level (including ground level, mezzanine level, first floor, second floor, and tower) brick and stone building. It was constructed between 1877 and 1882.

The Australian Mutual Fire Insurance Society Building as designed and originally constructed, had ornately modelled facades to each street frontage in the form of pedimented gables supported on Corinthian pilasters. Belted pilasters on the ground floor level contrasted to fluted pilasters on the upper storeys. The splayed corner with an arched parapet connected the two facades. Its corner location was strengthened by an octagonal tower with cupola which once reached to twice the height of the facade. Classical statuary on each of the pediments completed the impressive composition. The tower, statuary and ground level pilasters were later removed.

=== Fire insurance: Background, history and Pitt Street ===
Insurance associations proliferated and prospered in Sydney in the second half of the 1800s, following the NSW Legislation "Mutual Fire Insurance Association Act" of 1841. The fire insurance associations were originally cooperative "mutual societies" formed to protect members from financial loss, following models in England and America. By the end of the century they had moved to a business footing and were consolidating into powerful financial institutions. Around 1900, many companies exited the market or were absorbed by other firms.

The Pitt Street area was apparently a hub for fire insurance offices. The 1901 Sands Directory shows six fire insurance companies between Number 78 and Number 144 Pitt Street, including several with similar names: The City Mutual Fire Insurance Company Limited; the Colonial Mutual Fire Insurance Company Limited; as well as the Australian Mutual Fire Insurance Society. In the 1901 Sands Directory the side of the AMFIS building at Number 127 King Street (corner Pitt Street) was listed as Australian Mutual Fire Chambers but also housed solicitors, architects and indent merchants. In 1901 a tailor, a hatter, and a boot shop were listed as neighbours on the King Street side. In Sands Directory of 1918, the side of the building at 142-144 Pitt Street (corner King) still listed the Australian Mutual Fire Insurance Society, Limited, as the main tenant.

=== Conversion of use ===
From the end of World War I the building was being leased as shops and offices. Major remodelling took place to accommodate the change in use. Occupants of the building from this time included American Bag Stores Ltd, NSW Blinded Soldiers Tea Co. Ltd, Thompson Silk Stores, Californian Chocolate Shop, and Sellor's Silk Store.

In the 1970s the building was occupied by the Grahame Book Company, a well known bookshop which in the 1950s was regarded in a class with Dymocks and Angus & Robertson. As well as a retail shop, The Grahame Book Company was also a book publisher in Sydney since at least the 1940s. In the 1970s they applied for development approval to alter the premises for continuing use as shops and offices. The building was listed on the (since defunct) Register of the National Estate in 1983, and had a (NSW) Permanent Conservation Order placed on it in 1990. In 2003 Country Road retail shop and head office submitted proposals for refit and renovations.

== Description ==
=== Style ===
The former AMFIS building is a superbly crafted, monumental scale building with classical temple references. It was designed for its prominent location in the heart of Sydney's business district. The building's style promoted and reinforced the aims of its original owners: to project a sense of established tradition, display wealth, and inspire confidence and admiration in its customers and passersby.

The former AMFIS building is sited at the corner of two main streets, with no setback from the footpath. The four storey sandstone masonry building with mezzanine has been designed in the Victorian Free Classical style, utilising highly modelled sandstone elements around the windows of the first and second floors. The classical detailing: detailed pediments, dentilated cornice, pilasters, and aedicular windows; is applied consistently and symmetrically to both the King and Pitt Street facades and the corner facade.

The building is divided into seven bays on the King Street (north) facade with five bays extending across the Pitt Street (west) facade. The corner facade consists of one bay. Triangular pediments decorate the rooflines on the Pitt and King Street facades, contrasting with an arched broken pediment surmounting the corner facade. The pilaster/column style on the corner bay also contrasts with the sides; the corner having squared pilasters and the main street elevations having rounded pilasters. The date 1878 is on the corner facade.

=== Modifications ===
Above ground floor level there is an awning encircling both facades. The ground floor level exhibits major external modifications, where the original classical detailing and structure was removed. Below the first floor, a plain rendered band of masonry was evident in 2002 above the awning, undoubtedly representing the location of an earlier awning.

The building has a mezzanine level between the ground and first floors, accessed from the stair immediately inside the King Street central entrance. Ground floor and mezzanine levels exhibit contemporary fitouts, to function as retail areas. An entrance lobby located at the far east of the King Street facade, provides access to the upper floors which are fitted as office spaces.

In 2006 the renovated shopfronts, approved by the Heritage Office, present a street level design and awning with sympathetic reference to the upper storeys. The shop windows are interspersed with golden sandstone coloured stone columns with black bases, and a handsome awning complements the classical grandiosity of the original design.

=== Materials ===
The building is constructed of sandstone masonry with timber framed windows to first and second floor, and large glass shopfront windows to ground floor. Load bearing brick masonry walls and steel structure provide support. Internal walls are of plastered masonry and timber stud framed walls lined with fibrous plaster and plasterboard. The floor structure is timber at mezzanine, first and second floors, with concrete floor to ground floor. Concrete stairs with marble faced stairs provide access to office component. Plasterboard ceilings are at ground and mezzanine floors. Fibrous plaster and acoustic ceiling tiles to first and second floors. Decorative architraves and skirtings remain on first and second floors.

=== Condition ===
As at 1 June 2002, "The sandstone façade is in reasonable condition with some deterioration to the parapet and pediment capping stones. Earlier repairs to the face of the stonework are evident as discoloured patches which relate to fixing points for signage and services."

The first and second floors of façade retain almost all original external detailing. First and second floors retain early joinery (architraves and skirtings) on internal face of external walls. Original mezzanine and ground floor facades demolished. Original cupola, pediment statuary and tower missing. Ground floor, mezzanine and first floor retain little original internal detailing owing to fire.

=== Modifications and dates ===
- 1919 – Removal of the corner tower and cupola and also the pediment statuary at roofline. Construction of an additional upper floor behind roof parapet. Sandstone façade demolished at ground and mezzanine floors. Initial shop fronts for street level, designed with some relationship to upper floors by Robertson & Marks Architects. Upper façade supported by riveted steel girders and columns encased in concrete. Awning added. Lift, fire stairs and toilets added for office conversion.
- 1935 – Replacement awning replaces post-1919 awning. Subsequent shop fronts designed without consideration to the Classical sandstone façade above. Internal changes following fire 1934. Ground floor partition walls remodelled to enlarge retail space, and first and second floor office layout modified: larger offices subdivided to form small rooms facing King Street.
- Post 1950 – Numerous internal modifications.
- 2003 – New awning, internal works, and external signage in the form of banners hanging from projecting poles. New façade installed to shopfront spaces.

== Heritage listing ==
As at 6 October 2006, the building is a fine example of a Victorian office building with a richly detailed, classically influenced stone facade above awning level. The building has aesthetic significance for its ornate craftsmanship and streetscape contribution to a group of late nineteenth century retail buildings near the intersection of Pitt and King Streets, an important civic area in the city. The splayed corner detail gives special landmark prominence to this building marking the entrance to the Pitt Street Mall. The townscape qualities of the Pitt and King Street Group have historic significance and reflect Sydney's commercial development in the 19th century and changing consumer patterns after WWI. This area of Sydney has historic importance to the state as examples of the wealth and grandeur of 19th century commercial buildings utilising classical styles, which were headquarters for statewide companies.

Grahame's Corner was listed on the New South Wales State Heritage Register on 2 April 1999 having satisfied the following criteria.

The place is important in demonstrating the course, or pattern, of cultural or natural history in New South Wales.

The building is historically significant, reflecting Sydney's commercial development showing adaptation from office to retail use. The building was designed by prominent Victorian architect G. A. Morell, designer of The Swifts, Darling Point, 1882. It indicates the assets and importance of new companies in developing Sydney, including the emergence and rapid rise of the role of insurance companies in the financial sector.

The place is important in demonstrating aesthetic characteristics and/or a high degree of creative or technical achievement in New South Wales.

The building is aesthetically significant with a richly modelled stone facade in Free Classical style with pedimented gables supported on Corinthian columns. The design of the corner elevation is well articulated. Aesthetically significant for its streetscape contribution as part of a group of Victorian and Federation retail buildings near the intersection of Pitt and King Streets, that form part of an important civic area in the city.

The place has a strong or special association with a particular community or cultural group in New South Wales for social, cultural or spiritual reasons.

The building has social significance, important to the sense of place of Sydney's CBD, valued by the local community as well as visitors from outside Sydney.

The place possesses uncommon, rare or endangered aspects of the cultural or natural history of New South Wales.

It is a rare example of a highly decorative sandstone late Victorian building forming part of a group or heritage precinct in central Sydney at the corner of King and Pitt Streets (comprising Grahame's Corner at 142-144 Pitt Street; Sugar House at 138-140 Pitt Street, also listed on New South Wales State Heritage Register; and Commonwealth Bank/ Former Liverpool Arms Hotel at 181 Pitt Street, listed on the Central Sydney HLEP).

The place is important in demonstrating the principal characteristics of a class of cultural or natural places/environments in New South Wales.

The former AMFIS Building is a fine example of a classically influenced Victorian office building and has been a city landmark for over 100 years. It illustrates a vital period of Sydney's and the state's growth. The building demonstrates the change that took place in the city after the First World War with a greater need for retail accommodation on the street in prominent locations.

Together with the other buildings of the Pitt and King Street Group it constitutes an effective section of streetscape, providing striking contrast with the severity of new elements and helping to preserve a needed human scale for pedestrians.

== See also ==
- Australian non-residential architectural styles
