= Shane Moran =

Australian businessman

- Born: Sydney, Australia
- Education: St Joseph's College, Hunters Hill
- Alma mater: University of New South Wales; Harvard Business School
- Occupation: Chief executive officer of Provectus Care Group
- Spouse: Penelope Moran
- Children: Four

Dr Shane Moran is an Australian businessman working in the Australian health care and aged care sectors. Moran was the CEO of the Moran Health Care Group for fifteen years, during which time the group became the largest private residential aged care provider in Australia. In 2001, Moran set up the Provectus Care Group, which operates aged care facilities in Australia and was a pioneer developer and operator of high-end residential aged care facilities in China.

== Personal Life and Education ==
Moran was born in Sydney, Australia, the second son and fourth child of Douglas and Greta Moran. Shane and his three brothers attended secondary school at St Joseph's College, Hunters Hill. In his senior years he represented the college in athletics AAGPS (NSW) Athletics and rowing and played rugby on the wing in the college's first XV and was picked as a GPS rugby representative in 1978 and 1979. In his final year 1979, he won the college's Ancient History prize and was selected as a New South Wales 1st XV state schoolboy rugby representative.

Moran obtained degrees in Commerce and Law from the University of New South Wales, as well as a Masters of Law (International Business) and Advanced Management from Harvard Business School. He commenced Chinese language studies in 1986 and speaks Mandarin, French, Spanish and German. In 2001 Moran completed a Doctor in Philosophy (PhD) in Health, writing his doctoral thesis on the pending aged care crisis in China.

== Health and Aged Care Business ==
The Moran family has been a major developer, owner and operator of health and aged care facilities in Australia and internationaly for over 70 years (commencing in Sydney in1956). After working in accountancy (with PwC Australia) and in legal practice, in 1987 Moran was appointed chief executive officer of the family-owned Moran Health Care Group, which became Australia's largest private seniors' living and residential aged care provider during his fifteen-year tenure. During this time the group operated over 120 aged care facilities across Australia, the United Kingdom, Channel Islands and Singapore and ten private surgical, medical and rehabilitation hospitals across New South Wales and Queensland.

In 1988, Moran became a founding director of the National Association of Nursing Homes and Private Hospitals of Australia and was a foundation director of HESTA (the Health Employees Superannuation Trust of Australia).

In 2001 Moran fell out with his father over the direction being taken in relation to the British side of the Moran Health Care business. Shane departed as chief executive of the Moran Health Care Group. Doug Moran died in November 2011.

In 2001 Moran set up the Provectus Care Group, which operates high-end residential aged care and seniors' living facilities in New South Wales, Queensland and Victoria in Australia and residential aged care in Beijing and Shanghai in the People's Republic of China. In the mid-2000s, Moran was the major shareholder and founder of Pulse Health Limited (ASX: PHG) (previously known as Biometrics Ltd (ASX: BIX)), which built up a number of private hospitals and other health care services across regional Australia. On 16 May 2017, Healthe Care Australia, Australia's third largest corporate private hospital operator and pan-Asian health care services group, acquired Pulse Health's 13 hospital portfolio.

In 2018 Moran established a new seniors' living enterprise, Retirement By Moran, in association with Washington H. Soul Pattinson and Company Ltd (ASX:SOL), Australia's second oldest listed public company. In 2026 he set up Moran Capital Partners, a private investment, real estate and advisory platform focused principally on healthcare, seniors' living and selected commercial real estate in Sydney, Melbourne and the Gold Coast in Australia.

== Restoration of Heritage Properties ==
The Moran family has had a long association with the restoration of national and state significant heritage properties in Australia including Juniper Hall in Paddington, the federation properties Rosemorran in Wahroonga and Redleaf (also in Wahroonga and winner of the national Lachlan Macquarie Award for restoration), and the Hardy Wilson designed Blandford in Leura. In 2013 Moran bought out the last remaining family interest of the historic property Swifts. The property was originally purchased by the Moran family in 1997. It is regarded as “one of Sydney’s most famous houses”. He has since overseen what is considered to be one of Australia's largest private heritage restorations on the property.

In 2016 Moran acquired and fully restored Sydney's historic c. 1830s property Darling House, The Rocks, which is also registered as an item of both national, state and local heritage significance on the Register of the National Estate, the New South Wales State Heritage Register and the Sydney Local Environment Plan.

== Community Involvement ==
Shane Moran has been notably active in philanthropy, raising funds for a wide range of charitable causes, including a number of schools, hospitals and churches, as well as with community organisations involved in fields such as health and aged care, music, the arts and various sports. His philanthropic involvement have also included working with Dementia Australia's Research Foundation and providing crisis support at Sydney's Northern Beaches Women’s Shelter and a partnership with Mission Australia, Women & Children First and Bridge Housing for a Transitional Accommodation project in Narrabeen.

Over a number of years Moran has actively supported and hosted major fundraising events, such as opening his historic Swifts mansion in Darling Point Sydney for large-scale charity functions to benefit institutions like the Sydney Children's Hospital. Moran has also played a significant role in the restoration and preservation of important heritage properties, such as Swifts and Darling House in The Rocks ensuring their continued use for community and charitable purposes. Moran has served as a Foundation Director for the National Association of Nursing Homes & Private Hospitals Inc, the Health Employees Superannuation Trust of Australia Ltd (HESTA), the Tweed Regional Gallery, and the National Portrait Prize with an ongoing commitment to supporting health and arts organisations at a governance level. Moran's philanthropy often involves supporting the development and enhancement of long-lasting community assets, such as hospitals and educational facilities. This focus on infrastructure ensures that the benefits of his contributions extend well into the future. Through these initiatives and ongoing support, Moran has contributed to the advancement and wellbeing of numerous educational, health, heritage, arts and faith-based charities and organisations across Australia.
