= Moran Health Care Group =

- Type: Private
- Industry: Aged care
- Founded: 1956; 70 years ago
- Founders: Doug Moran; Greta Moran
- Headquarters: Sydney, New South Wales, Australia
- Key people: Shane Moran; Peter Moran
- Services: Residential aged care, dementia care, respite care, palliative care and nursing
- Number of employees: 800+
- Website: morangroup.com.au

Moran Health Care Group is an Australian family-owned aged care provider headquartered in Sydney, New South Wales. As of 2026, its aged care homes are located in Engadine, Kellyville, Stockton and Sylvania.

== History ==
Moran Health Care Group was established in 1956 by Doug Moran and Greta Moran. Greta Moran had previously trained as a registered nurse at Royal Prince Alfred Hospital in Sydney, while Doug Moran had a background in business and property development.

In 1987, Shane Moran was appointed chief executive officer of the family-owned group, a position he held for 15 years. In 1988, the Morans established the Moran Arts Foundation and the Doug Moran National Portrait Prize. By the early 2000s, the group operated 39 aged care nursing homes in Australia.

In 2001, the group's British business entered receivership, with losses reported at approximately $30 million. Shane Moran resigned from the group in late 2001 after 14 years with the company, including 10 years as chief executive. Following the restructuring, Moran Health Care Group sold its portfolio of 39 aged care homes. A 2010 report in The Sydney Morning Herald linked Shane Moran's departure with the restructuring of the group's British operations. Peter Moran, another son of Doug and Greta Moran, subsequently became managing director of Moran Health Care Group.

In 2016, the University of Canberra and Moran Health Care Group completed a residential aged care facility at its Bruce campus.

In 2023, the group acquired the Stockton aged care home in Stockton, previously operated as Presbyterian Aged Care Stockton Wescott. Moran announced refurbishment works following the acquisition, including refurbishment of rooms and upgrades to communal and clinical areas.

Moran Health Care Group subsequently transferred its Moran Roxburgh Park facility in Roxburgh Park, Victoria, to another operator, leaving the group with four residential aged care homes in New South Wales.

In 2026, the group marked the 70th anniversary of its establishment. The company stated that it employed more than 800 staff across its aged care homes and Sydney head office.

== Operations ==
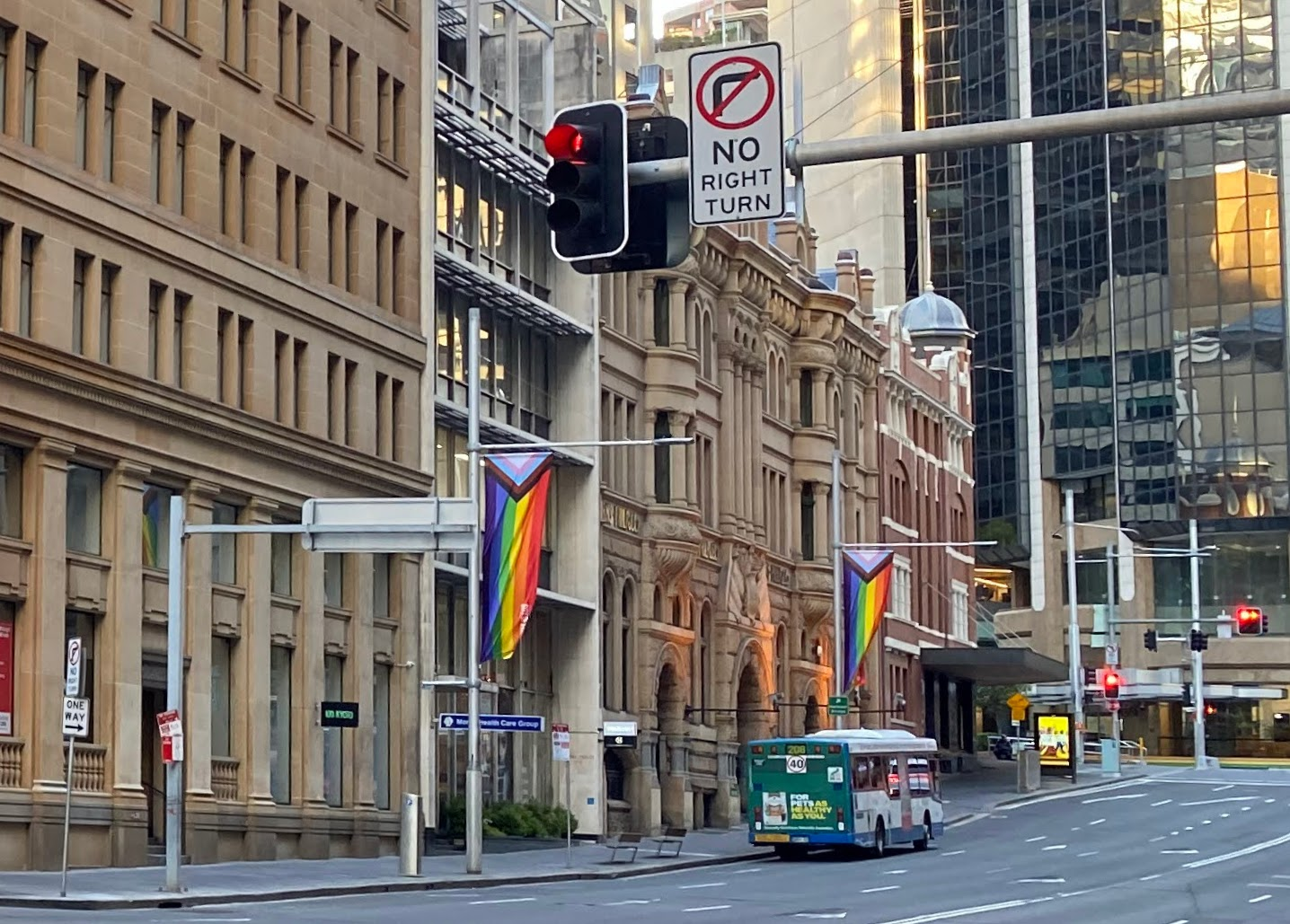
Moran House (centre), the group's Sydney headquarters, in 2019

Moran Health Care Group provides residential aged care and related services for older Australians. Its services include dementia care, respite care, palliative care and nursing.

As of 2026, the group operates four aged care homes:

- Moran Engadine in Engadine, in southern Sydney
- Moran Kellyville in Kellyville, in north-western Sydney
- Moran Sylvania in Sylvania, in the Sutherland Shire
- Moran Stockton in Stockton, near Newcastle

The group retains its headquarters at Moran House, Bridge Street, Sydney.

== See also ==
- Aged care in Australia
- Doug Moran National Portrait Prize
