= Darling House, Millers Point =

Darling House
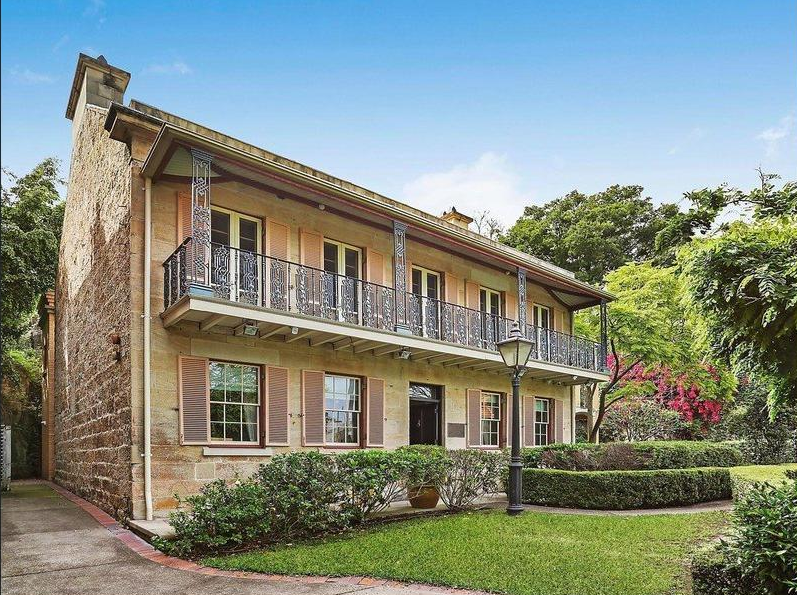

- Location within Sydney Location within Australia
- 33.8576°S 151.2067°E
- Location: 8–12 Trinity Avenue, Dawes Point, City of Sydney, New South Wales, Australia

History
- Built: c. 1835–1842

Site notes
- Architectural style: Georgian-style Old Colonial

New South Wales Heritage Register
- Official name: Building
- Type: State heritage (built)
- Designated: 2 April 1999
- Reference no.: 842
- Type: Historic site

Darling House is a restored heritage manor located at 8–12 Trinity Avenue, in the inner city Sydney suburb of Millers Point in the City of Sydney local government area of New South Wales, Australia. Originally constructed as a private residence, this grand Georgian building now has been adapted for use as short stay accommodation. Darling House was added to the New South Wales State Heritage Register on 2 April 1999, in recognition of its historical and architectural significance to Sydney.

The Georgian-style Old Colonial sandstone building incorporates parts of an original c. 1833 to c. 1835 dwelling house, the existing sandstone house was constructed in 1842 under the ownership of Joseph Farris. The name of the house, which originated from the local community in the 1800s, is derived from the original land grant by Governor Darling. Darling House holds particular historical, social and architectural significance due to its influence on the history and early social development of Dawes Point and early colonial Australia and as a representative example of Georgian style architecture in neo-colonial Australia. Darling House is distinctive as one of only a few remaining free standing dwellings in the area and rarer still for its generous curtilage in the form of landscaped gardens.

== History ==
Dawes Point is one of the earliest areas of European settlement in Australia, and a focus for maritime activities. This building has been newly renovated and, with new addition, has become a nursing home.

=== Pre-European and early history ===
Originally known by the Aboriginal names of Tar-ra and Tullagalla, Dawes Point was later renamed after Lieutenant William Dawes (1762–1836), astronomer with the First Fleet. Before white settlement the area was home to the Cadigal (also spelled Gadigal) aboriginal tribe. Dawes Point holds historical significance as it was the site of the first guns mounted in Sydney in 1788, as well as the Dawes Point Battery, Sydney's first cemetery and the site of Sydney's first port facilities. The area is also commonly referred to as Dawes Point or The Rocks.

European activity around Millers Point and Dawes Point commenced with the beginning of Sydney's history, in 1788. There appear to be no actual structures on Dawes Point until slightly later - as can be seen from plans dated to 1788, 1792, 1802 and 1807. Though Dawes Point boasted an observatory built by Lieutenant William Dawes as early as 1788 and "Dawes Battery" was established next to it. By 1812 there was a wind-powered post mill behind the battery, owned by Nathaniel Lucas, which was then sold, with the surrounding land, to John Leighton (also known as Jack the Miller) in 1814. Between this time and 1822, there were three windmills in the area probably both owned and run by Leighton and hence this part of Sydney Harbour came to be known as Dawes Point. Apart from the windmills, it seems that there was also a slaughterhouse run in Dawes Point, probably by Tom Cribb. The rocky terrain of the peninsula made the area unappealing for residential structures as only Lower Fort Street, at this point unnamed, could allow vehicular access to the area.

The area was quarried in 1823 and by 1830 there were six quarrying parties whose work contributed to the cut for the future Argyle and Kent Streets which in turn made the whole area more accessible and allowed for residential development. With the development of steam milling and the abandonment of the old windmills, the area turned to maritime trades and many wharves and warehouses were established. With the increasing number of wealthy merchants and wharf owners moving into Millers Point and Dawes Point, Lower Fort Street began to develop as an area with "respectable dwelling houses" as commented by Maclehose in 1839.

=== Original dwelling c. 1833–1835 ===
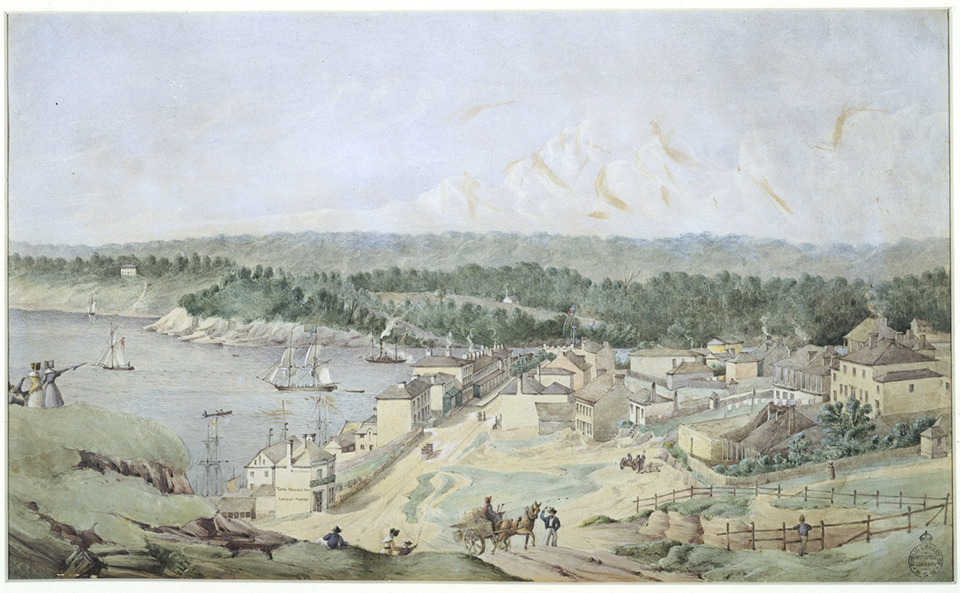
Dawes Point 1840s looking north (with Darling House in centre), watercolour by Joseph Fowels, State Library of NSW

The land upon which Darling House now stands was granted to Susanna Ward by Governor Darling in 1823 and in 1831 was transferred to Ms Susanna Elizabeth Douglas. Prior to the construction of any buildings, the site had been used as a sandstone quarry and it is from this quarry that the convict hand carved sandstone blocks from which the house is built are likely to have been quarried. The first building on the site is assumed to have been a stone building constructed during the early to mid-1830s. This can be deduced from the transfer of land in 1837 from Susanna Douglas to Michael Gannon which includes a reference to buildings having already been present (as well as the relatively sharp rise in the cost of the land from £101 in 1837 to £200 in 1839). It also seems that the second house, being the current sandstone building now standing on the site was built over the original building and was constructed during the depression of the early 1840s. Darling House incorporates some of the original foundations, retaining walls, stonework, cobbled paving and part of a brick cavity wall from the original early 1830s building and parts of the building are assumed to date from this earlier c.1833 to c.1835 period. There are no surviving mapping or historical records to show details of the original house although archaeological records for the adjoining property at 30-42 Lower Fort Street show the existence of a pre-1822 stone building which, as with Darling House itself, was extended, modified and converted into two dwellings during the mid-19th century.

=== Construction of Darling House, c.1840 ===
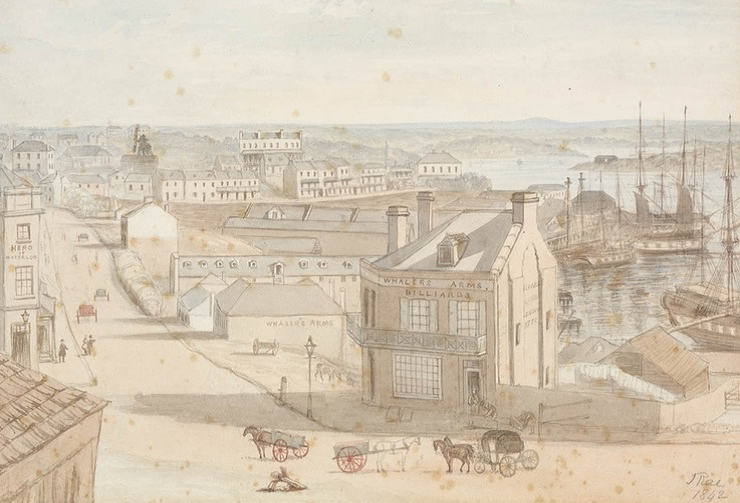
John Rae's 1842 sketch "Millers Point from Flagstaff Hill", with Darling House to left

The sandstone building now known as "Darling House" was built by Joseph Farris in the early 1840s, a period of great depression in Sydney. It was a large house of eight rooms (at a time when most houses in Dawes Point contained two or four rooms), with its construction clearly being an attempt by the owner to build a fashionable stone dwelling designed to fit in with the other grand Lower Fort Street houses. The success of local mercantilist ventures and associated industries became evident in both commercial and residential architecture, constructed for merchants such as Robert Towns and Robert Campbell. Sections of Dawes Point became regarded as affluent enclaves, with Argyle and Lower Fort Streets known as 'Quality Row.' Darling House was built to provide residential accommodation for the growing number of workers moving into the area that were associated with the expanding wharves along the Dawes Point shoreline (such growth resulting from the exporting of wool to England and from the whaling industry). The site on which the house was built comprised two allotments, the northern allotment was granted to Joseph Farris and the southern allotment to Michael Gannon, a local builder. Soon after the allotments were granted Gannon admitted that, at the time the grant was made, the southern allotment was actually the property of Farris and in 1842 Gannon formally conveyed the allotment to Farris for the nominal sum of five shillings.

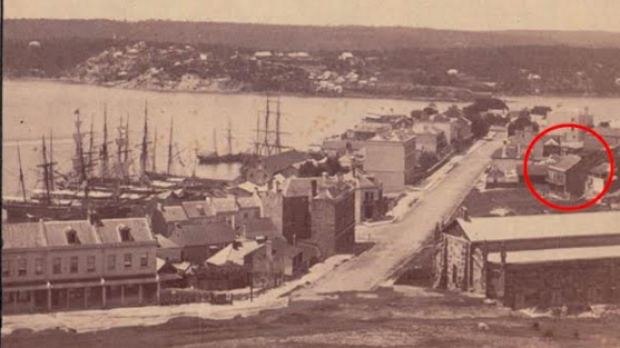
Darling House c. 1862.

Upon construction, the interior of the house was divided by a large corridor. On the ground floor to the left of the corridor there was a dining/living room with two bedrooms on the right. On the upper floor there were four bedrooms on either side of the corridor. A stone kitchen and breakfast room were connected to the rear of the house, a bathroom to the right of the backdoor and timber laundry against the rock face. During the 1860s the ground and first floor Victorian verandas were added to the house, with the first floor windows being converted into French doors. These modifications are classic representative examples of the development of Australian architecture away from the traditional English styles in response to local environmental factors. English bald faced buildings offered little protection against the sun while the French doors and veranda allowed for greater air circulation through the house alleviated the effects of the heat during the summer months. Such architectural features are illustrative of the way in which Australian architectural styles were forced to differ from the traditional English styles to accommodate for the vastly different Australian climate.

==== Joseph Henry Farris (1807–1859) ====
Joseph Henry Farris was born in England in 1807, to Joseph Farris and Hannah Longhurst. In 1827 Farris’ father died leaving him an inheritance. He used this inheritance to book passage for himself and his wife, Elizabeth to Australia, arriving in Sydney in May 1830. As a free settler, Farris quickly established himself as a prolific local businessman plying his trade as a boat builder, publican and Sergeant in the water police. As a prominent individual in Sydney at the time, Farris’ name was inscribed upon the visiting list at Government House. An avid boat builder and regatta competitor, in 1832 Farris built the first boat ever manufactured in Australia, which he subsequently raffled off for a total of £30.

"On Friday the first boat built in this Colony, on the plan of a London wherry, was launched from the yard of Mr. Farris, boat builder, in Windmill Street. She is 25 feet 8 inches keel, and 4 feet 4 inches beam. She was built to contend with Major Lockyer's wherry, received per Clyde. The match will come off shortly".

— Sydney Herald, 22 November 1832

Farris obtained prominence around Sydney as a publican, holding licences for the Whalers Arms Hotel located on the corner of Windmill Street and Lower Fort Street, the Young Princess Hotel (now the Hero of Waterloo) and the Shakespeare Hotel. It appears that Farris never resided at Darling House. It was built as a commercial venture which Farris owned together with three other commercial residences on Fort Street. The house was leased out to various middle-class, educated residents (including artists, musicians, teachers and police officers) for a period of around 60 years whilst the family owned the property and until it was resumed by the Sydney Harbour Trust in 1901.

==== Notable residents and occupants of Darling House (1842–1900) ====
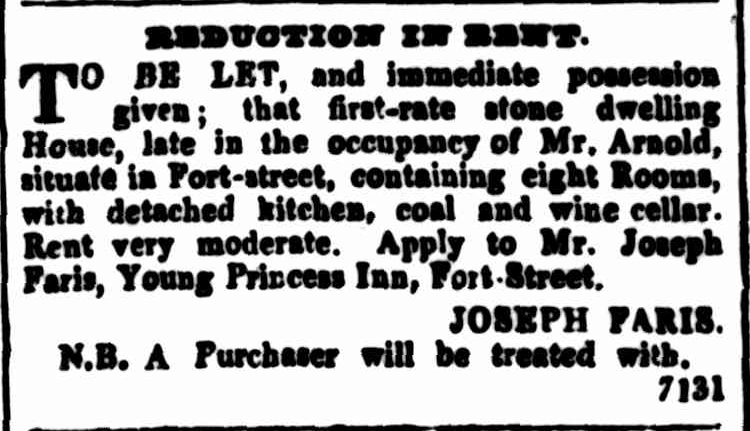
To Let advertisement for Darling House, The Sydney Morning Herald, 12 October 1842

The first record for lease of the house is an advertisement dated 12 October 1842, which read:

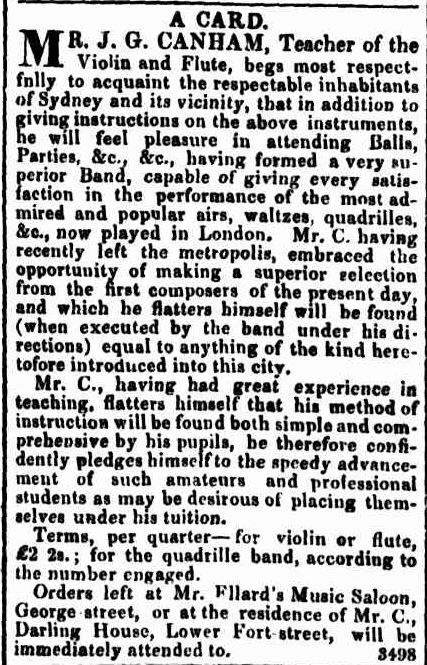
Advertisement from Mr Canham, resident of Darling House, offering violin and flute lessons, Sydney Morning Herald, 9 March 1844

"That first-rate stone dwelling House, late in the occupancy of Mr. Arnold, situated in Fort-street, containing eight Rooms, with detached kitchen, coal and wine cellar Rent very moderate. Apply to Mr. Joseph Faris, Young Princess Inn, Fort-Street. N.B. A purchaser will be treated with".

— The Sydney Morning Herald, 12 October 1842

Early occupants and residents of Darling House have been distilled from public advertisements in Sydney papers and also from Sydney City Council rates assessment records and the Sands Directory. Some notable resident at Darling house included Mr Canham, a musician in the colony. An advertisement in the Sydney Morning Herald of 9 March 1844 advertised music lessons (violin and flute) from the then resident of Darling House, a Mr J. G. Canham. In addition to "giving instructions on the above instruments", Mr Canham advertised that "he will feel pleasure in attending Balls, Parties, &c, having formed a very superior Band, capable of giving every satisfaction in the performance of the most admired and popular airs, waltzes, quadrilles, &c, now played in London. Orders left at the residence of Mr C., Darling House, Lower Fort Street, will be immediately attended to".

Mr John B Edmonds, celebrated bibliophile and bookseller also resided at Darling House around 1844. He imported and sold from this residence "one of the most splendid collections of Books of every description of English and foreign literature, together with Fine Arts... ever offered to the Australian public". Doctor Leopold Sachs resided in Darling House from 1861 to 1876. Doctor Sachs was a prominent Sydney surgeon and homeopathic doctor, renowned for giving free medical advice to the poor. Mrs Rosa Strange was the wife of prominent naturalist Frederick Strange, who accompanied Charles Sturt on his 1844 expedition to Central Australia and collected on expeditions with the well known zoologist John Gould . She resided in Darling House through the late 1870s and 1880s and as a school teacher ran a school in the local area. Scottish born painter, illustrator, engraver and lithographer, George Baird Shaw also lived in Darling House around 1857. It was during his residence at Darling House that Shaw published a highly finished engraving on steel of the Lord Bishop of Sydney, Bishop Frederic Barker. Rosaleen Norton, also known as the Witch of Kings Cross, lived in Darling House at the time that it was a boarding house in the early 1900s. She received prominence due to her satanic drawings that were often published in local tabloid newspapers.

The house originally suffered from the constant discharge of water closets from the houses facing Prince's Street. The stench was so bad that the occupiers were compelled to close all the doors and windows at the back of the house to keep out the horrid smells. Upon the death of Joseph Farris, circa. 1859, his widow Elizabeth Farris resided in the house. During this time she rented out a number of the rooms and kept an aviary and goats on the property.

=== Outbreak of the plague (1900) ===
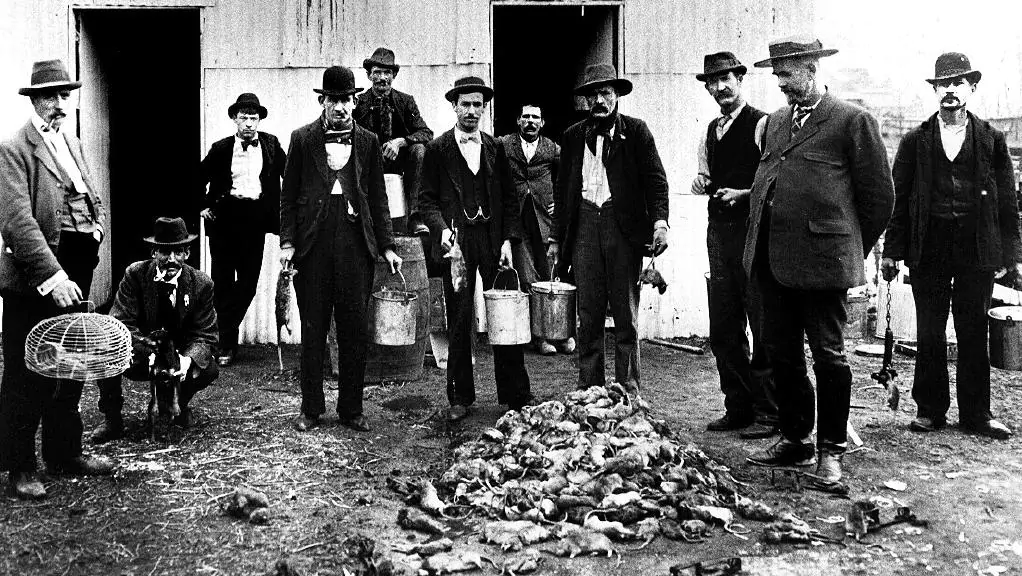
Catching rats, the plague 1900

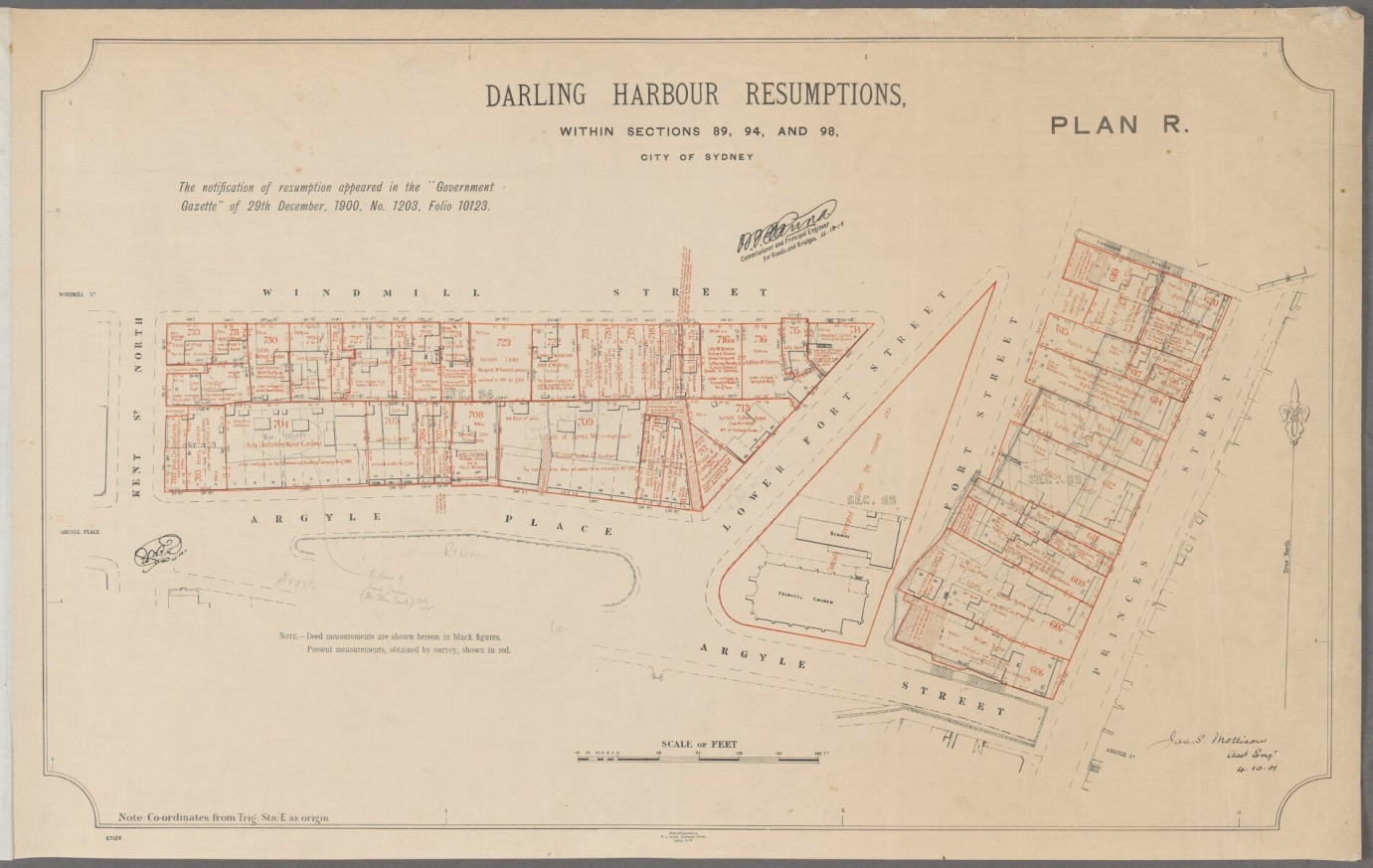
Map of Darling Harbour Resumptions, 1900

The Bubonic Plague struck the Rocks area and Dawes Point in December 1900, with the first reported case being Arthur Payne, a carter who worked in the Rocks. The New South Wales Government and Sydney Council took this opportunity to redevelop the area and began a quarantine and cleansing operation in The Rocks, Dawes Point (including present day Dawes Point) and Darling Harbour. The Sydney Harbour Trust was formed in 1901 and given extensive powers to rebuild, reclaim land, build new infrastructure and manage the facilities along the port of Sydney. The Sydney Harbour Trust resumed almost all of the properties in The Rocks, Dawes Point and Darling Harbour between 1900 and 1902 in order to clean up the area and implement quarantine measures.

=== Resumption by Sydney Harbour Trust (1901) and use of Darling House until 1990s ===
On 29 December 1900 the Sydney Harbour Trust issued notice in the Government Gazette of the resumption of Darling House, which occurred in 1901 under the Darling Harbour Wharves Resumption Act 1900, although the Sydney City Council Rates Assessments Books still noted the Farris family as Owner Landlord of the property right up until 1906. Darling House was fortunate to survive this period as many of the houses in the area were deemed unhygienic and demolished, with the backyards being covered in concrete or asphalt.

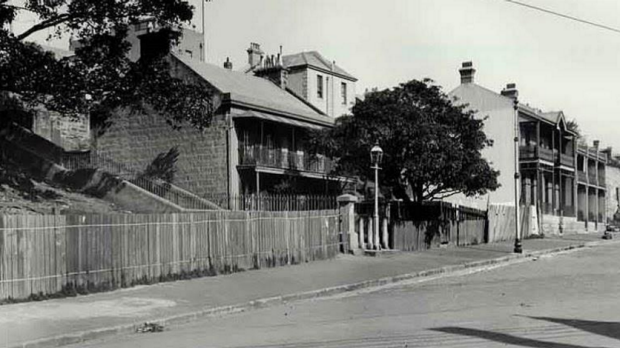
Darling House c1901

Upon resumption by the Sydney Harbour Trust, the land on which Darling House stood and the vacant land on the southern allotment were clearly distinguished as separate entities in the rates assessment books. There was a clear distinction between the use of Darling House, as a boarding house and residential accommodation, and the use of the southern allotment for commercial purposes. Upon resumption, the Sydney Harbour Trust almost immediately converted Darling House into a boarding house and accommodation was leased out by the State Government of New South Wales. In 1948-49 Darling House was converted into a warehouse, resulting in the demolition of most of the internal walls and outbuildings on the property to allow vehicle access to the back of the house. From that point on the house was leased to a variety of commercial companies. The last recorded commercial tenant of Darling House was Lep Transport who installed a petrol tank and bowser onto the property. After Lep Transport vacated the facility, the year of which is unknown, the property remained vacant and fell into a state of disrepair.

The southern part of the site which formed a separate allotment remained vacant for much of the time since historic occupation of The Rocks and Dawes Point although one historical map indicates a shed may have stood on the land. Oral records from local residents living in the area in the early twentieth century also recall the vacant site being used for a variety of purposes including an outdoor cinema and a plasterer's workshop. Around 1918, the rates assessment books indicate that the site was leased to Charles Rasmussen & Co, makers/repairers of casks and barrels, and as a cooperage, store and laundry. At this time a one-storey brick building comprising two rooms, stood on the land.

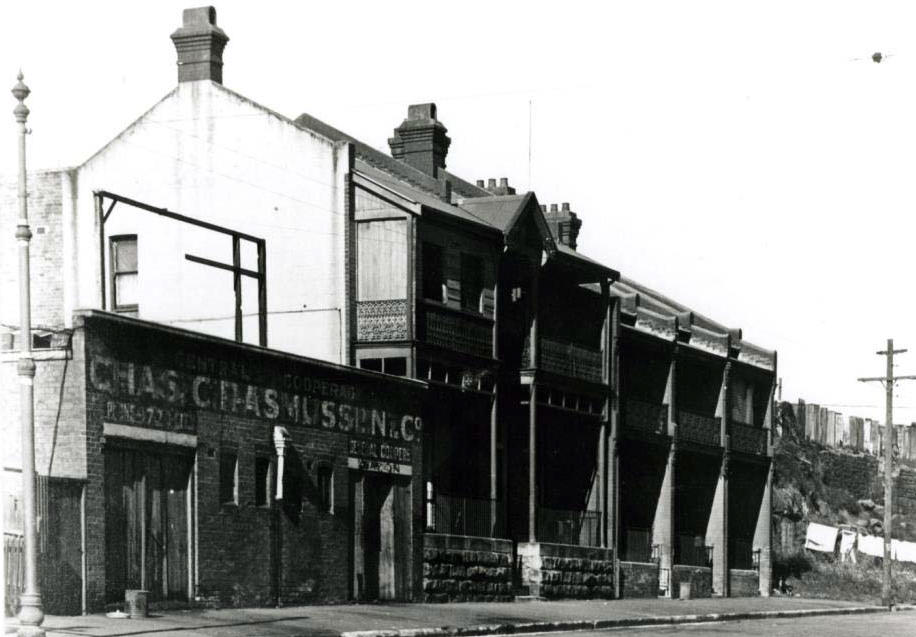
Use of the southern allotment of Darling House site as a cooperage by Chas.Rasmussen & Co c1918

=== Caraher's Stairs ===
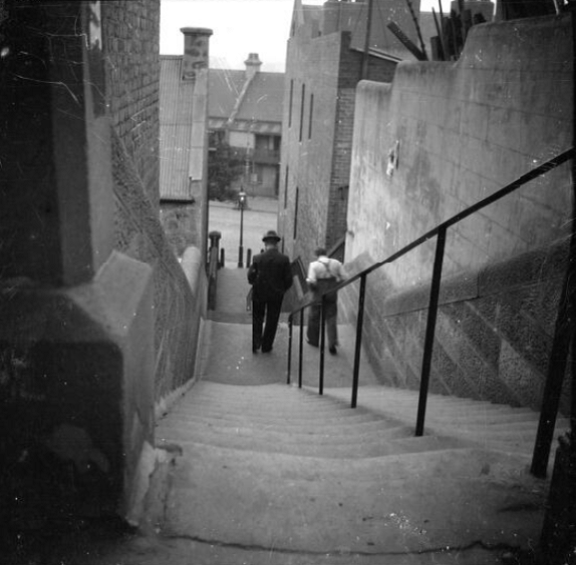
Caraher's Stairs c. 1920.

In 1857 Caraher's Stairs was constructed, flanking the northern wall of Darling House. The stairs were constructed to provide local residents access up to Princes Street (now the site of the Sydney Harbour Bridge) and was named after Owen Joseph Caraher, a local soap merchant. The stairs were a prominent thoroughfare, providing access between Dawes Point and central Sydney.

The stairway was heavily used and some of the behaviours and practises that occurred on the stairs prompted the local Citizens Vigilance Committee to write to the Town Clerk in a letter dated 10 July 1900: "It appears that these stairs are the resort of people who continually lounge about them and cover the steps with expectoration, tobacco juice etc. It is also stated that frequently there are rotten eggs thrown on the stairs in addition to the dust and dirt caused by continual traffic. Under these circumstances we are directed to ask that they be swept at least once a day and that they be hosed with water twice a week. In their present state they are almost impassable to ladies who wish to keep their dresses clean".

In 1933 the stairs were demolished as part of the construction of the Sydney Harbour Bridge. There are still small remnants of this stairway in situ at the northern boundary of Darling House. A fragment of the original material, part of the original sandstone side wall and coping remain, and a darker colour to the brickwork on the building that was built while the stairway existed shows the outline of the stairway.

=== Conversion to The Rocks Cottage Nursing Home, 1994 ===
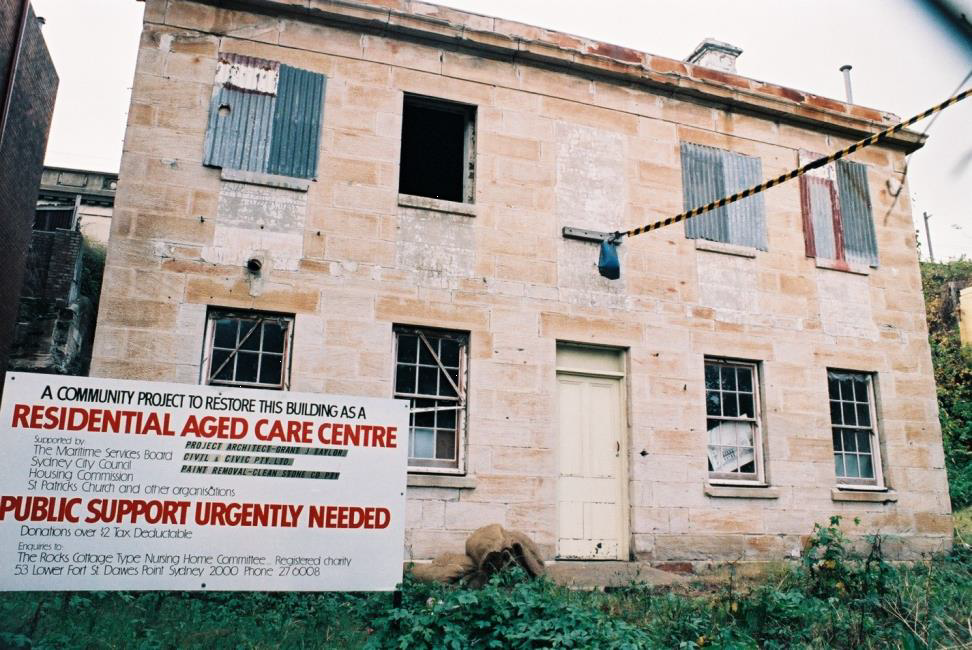
Darling House prior to restoration c1992

In 1994 Darling House underwent extensive renovations under the design of heritage architect Howard Tanner, including the construction of a new dwelling on the southern allotment, in order to convert the house into an aged care facility. The conversion into an aged care facility was a community initiative of the Resident Action Group in Partnership with the Rocks Cottage Type Nursing Home Committee. It was a community funded and supported organisation from the time of its opening on 4 October 1994 until 2015.

In 2014 the State Government of New South Wales made the decision to sell 293 Government owned houses in Dawes Point and Dawes Point to private purchasers, which it did through until 2018. In 2015 the State Government of New South Wales made the decision to raise the rent on Darling House from five dollars per month to a market rate, which led to the closure of the aged care facility and subsequent sale of the property.

=== Purchase and restoration by Dr Shane Moran, 2016 ===
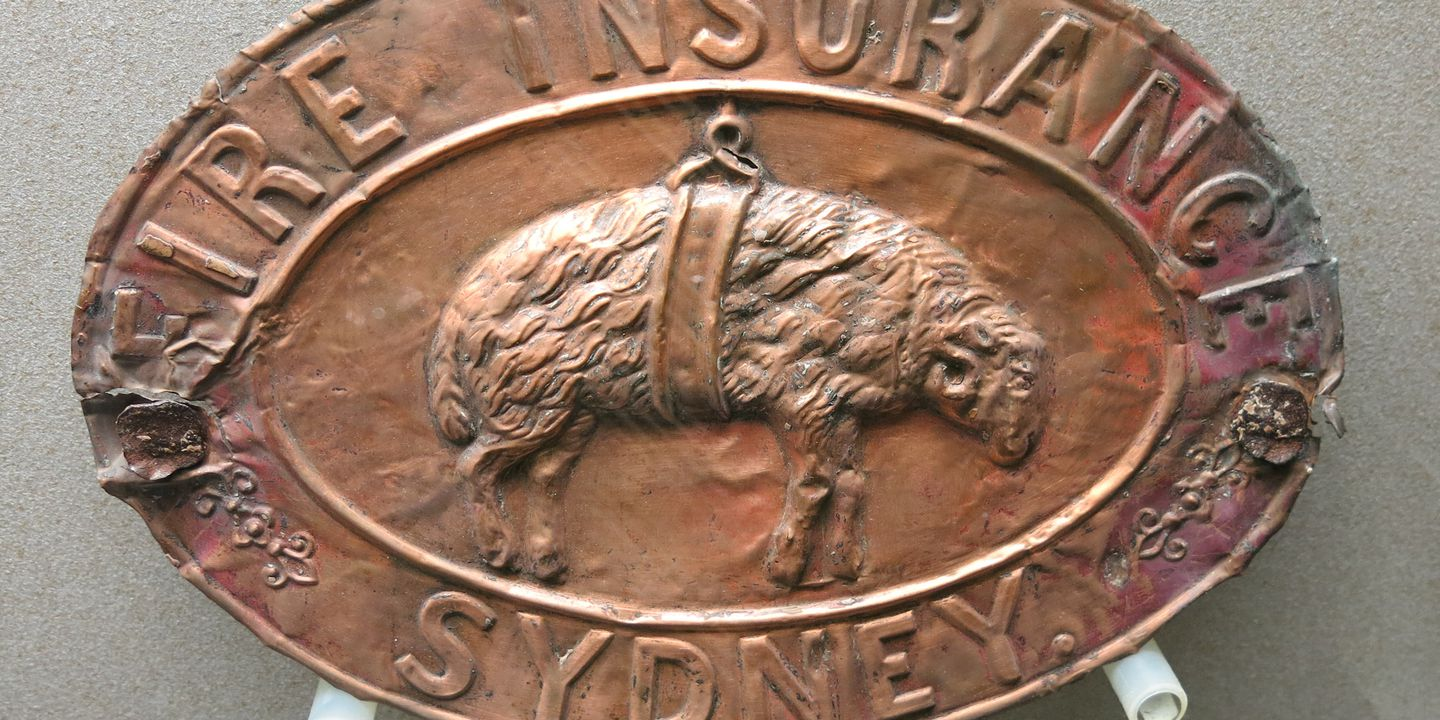
Fire mark from the Fire Insurance Company Sydney Copper incorporating the golden fleece emblem, c. 1844.

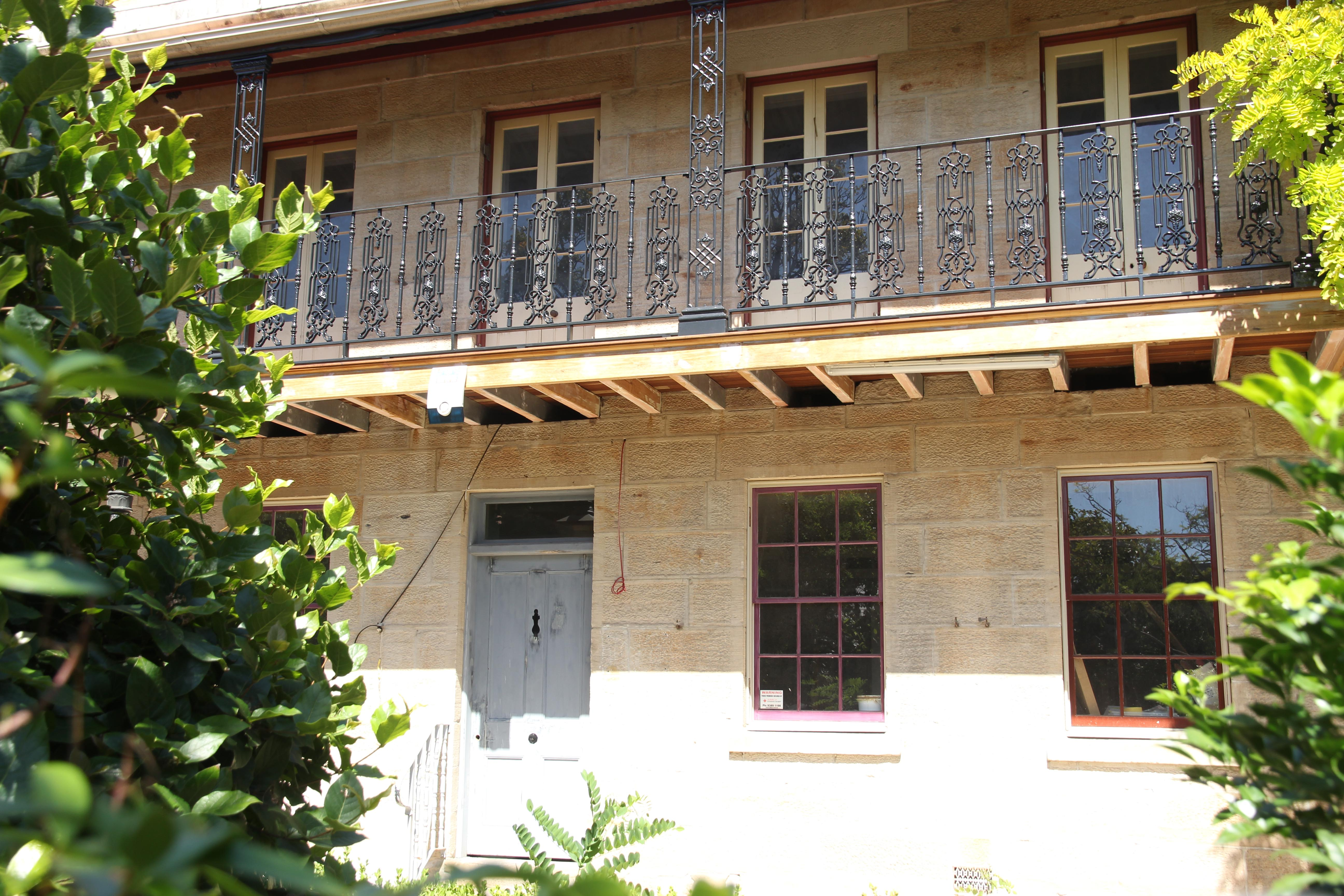
Darling House, pictured in 2019 undergoing restoration.

In February 2016 the vacant and increasingly dilapidated Darling House property was purchased for $7.7 million from the New South Wales Land and Housing Corporation at public auction by Dr Shane Moran. Dr Moran had also been involved in the ownership and restoration of another one of Sydney's heritage properties, Swifts, Darling Point. Following the purchase of the Darling House property, Dr Moran stated his intention to restore the original Georgian house and subsequent additions to an aged care residence or seniors' living facility, albeit a more upmarket one then previously, "ensuring that the original Georgian features are restored". The Chairman of the Millers Point Resident Action Group Mr John McInerney said, at the time of the sale, that although he wasn't opposed to the new aged care facility he was angered that the New South Wales government "has taken a community facility, cashed it in for $7 million odd dollars and has now made it inaccessible to the bulk of residents around here" The property has undergone a major heritage restoration and upgrade during the period from 2016 to 2019 in order to both maintain the integrity of the original historic building as well as to enhance its adaptive re-use as a boutique luxury seniors' living and retirement home. The extensive works over a period of more than three years involved the complete replacement of the slate roof, installation throughout of cedar joinery and staircases, original marble fireplaces, old leadlight windows and doors and the extensive upgrading of the building to BCA Class 3 standards and integration of all modern technology and systems.

During the period of the restoration of Darling House, a rare and original c. 1844 fire insurance mark from the Sydney Fire Insurance Company was located and was displayed within the property. The Sydney Fire Insurance Company was established in 1844 at 468 George Street Sydney. Fire marks were issued for display at properties insured by the company against fire, there being no public fire brigades in the colony of New South Wales at that time. The Sydney Fire Insurance Company fire mark was in pressed copper displaying the company's name and an image of a golden fleece, being at that time in the colony a sign of safety and security following the growth of the wool industry. The symbol of the golden fleece has been adopted as the emblem for Darling House depicting this history and the association with security.

== Description ==
Two storey Regency house of sandstone. Newly renovated and, with new building on adjoining block, is now a boutique assisted living building containing nine independent suites. Five french doors open onto second storey balcony with metal balustrade and veranda posts. Corrugated galvanised iron roof to main building and verandah painted in wide stripes. Lower storey has four sash windows and entrance door with fanlight. Storeys: 2 (plus attics). Construction: Sandstone, Welsh slate roof (fully replaced during the recent restoration), cast iron and painted metal balustrading, timber period joinery, stained glass windows, heritage marble fireplaces, parquetry flooring. Style: Georgian, Regency, Victorian, Late Twentieth Century

== Heritage listing ==
As at 23 November 2000, this property is an integration of refurbishment and new construction within an historic context. It is part of the Millers Point Conservation Area, an intact residential and maritime precinct. It contains residential buildings and civic spaces dating from the 1830s and is an important example of C19th adaptation of the landscape. Building was listed on the New South Wales State Heritage Register on 2 April 1999.

Darling House is registered as an item of both national, state and local heritage significance being on the (now defunct) Register of the National Estate, the New South Wales State Heritage Register and the Sydney Local Environment Plan. Being located within and described as the "crown jewel" of Dawes Point, Darling House has also been included in the various heritage listings that apply to the Millers Point/Dawes Point precinct as a whole including the Millers Point and Dawes Point Conservation Area, Millers Point & Dawes Point Village Precinct and the Millers Point Conservation Area.

== See also ==
- Australian residential architectural styles
- Juniper Hall, Paddington
