= Swifts, Darling Point =

Swifts
- Alternative names: The Swifts

General information
- Type: Heritage listed house
- Architectural style: Gothic Revival
- Location: 68 Darling Point Road, Darling Point, Municipality of Woollahra, New South Wales, Australia
- Coordinates: 33°52′10″S 151°14′18″E
- Groundbreaking: 1873
- Completed: 1877
- Renovated: From 1997 ongoing
- Client: Sir Robert Lucas Lucas-Tooth
- Owner: Dr Shane Moran

Design and construction
- Architect: G. A. Morrell
- Awards: Governor Lachlan Macquarie Award (2012)

Register of the National Estate
- Official name: The Swifts, 68 Darling Point Rd, Darling Point, NSW, Australia
- Type: Defunct register
- Designated: 21 October 1980
- Reference no.: 2577
- Type: Historic
- Place File No.: 1/12/041/0091

New South Wales Heritage Register
- Official name: Swifts
- Type: State heritage (complex / group)
- Designated: 2 April 1999
- Reference no.: 146
- Type: Other – Landscape – Cultural
- Category: Landscape – Cultural

Swifts (also known as The Swifts) is a heritage-listed late-Victorian castellated Gothic Revival mansion located in the suburb of Darling Point, Sydney. Swifts is a rare survivor of a group of similar grand private residences sited on the southern shore of Sydney Harbour. It is described by the Australian Heritage Council as "perhaps the grandest house remaining in Sydney". Swifts was listed on the Register of the National Estate on 21 October 1980, and the New South Wales State Heritage Register on 2 April 1999.

The motto Perseverantia Palmam Obtinebit, being Latin for "perseverance gains the prize", is carved into the eastern façade of Swifts and seems to sum up the home as well as the lives of those who have lived in it.

Designed by G. A. Morrell, Swifts was built in stages from around 1873 to 1882 by Sir Robert Lucas Lucas-Tooth, the distinguished Australian brewer. In the 1880s, Sir Robert Lucas-Tooth had the house significantly remodelled in the style and likeness of his family home, Great Swifts Manor in Cranbrook, Kent. The house was subsequently purchased by Edmund Resch, also a brewer, and eventually bequeathed by his son Edmund Resch Jr to the Roman Catholic Church upon his death in 1963. In 1997, Swifts was acquired by the Moran family and, in what saved the home from a state of dereliction and possible destruction, underwent total restoration and renovation. Dr Shane Moran is the current owner.

== History ==
=== Yarranabbe ===
Darling Point is located within the area of the Cadigal people, one of the Aboriginal clans of the Sydney region, and was known from at least 1795 as "Yarranabbe". The plan of land for sale at Darling Point in 1856 cites the Indigenous name for the point, and the name is listed in the Town and Country Journal's 'Aboriginal names of places' of 1878.

=== Mrs Darling's Point ===
By the 1830s the vast majority of the harbour fronting land east of Darling Point was held by a small number of landholders, being principally the Cooper and Wentworth families, while at Double Bay, a government village had been reserved. At Darling Point, Governor Darling reserved the promontory for sale in 1831 at the suggestion of the Surveyor General, Thomas Mitchell. The area was subsequently surveyed into large villa allotments and referred to the promontory as 'Mrs Darling's Point' in respect to Eliza Darling, the wife of the Governor. However, the "Mrs" was dropped over time.

=== Purchase by Thomas Barker of the Villa Grants on Mrs Darling's Point ===
The first auction on the northern part of the promontory came on 11 October 1833 under the direction of Governor Darling's successor, Governor Bourke. At the sale, nine allotments varying in area between 2.4 and 6.1 hectares (6 and 15 acres) were offered. The reserve price per acre was A£10 but the average price actually paid was much higher at £34. Swifts is located on allotment four which was originally three point nine five hectares (nine point seven five acres) in size when it was purchased by Thomas Barker in November 1833. Barker also purchased the adjoining allotment of three point one four hectares (seven point seven five acres) at the same time. The total purchase price for the 6.9 hectares (17 acres) was £573.

=== Subdivision of the villa grants ===
With no development evidently having occurred, Barker's Darling Point grant was soon sold in 1835 to Thomas Icely. Icely had also acquired the neighbouring allotment of Lindesay at the time. Icely had been settled in the colony since 1822 and after an early dalliance in trading, went into pastoralism. The Darling Point grant, arguably the most favourably sited and extensive on the promontory, remained vacant. In the same year the Kent Brewery was opened on Parramatta Road at Blackwattle Bay. It was founded by John Tooth and his brother-in-law, Charles Newnham.

Meanwhile, Barker's two grants, within which Swifts is sited, had been purchased in 1838 by Thomas Urmson Ryder, a partner in the mercantile company Aspinall, Brown & Co. Ryder had the land subdivided into 14 lots suitable for villas and put up for auction in April 1840 as the DeLamere Estate, which netted some £13,531. With the northernmost allotments comprising the site of the future Swifts, ownership changed hands successively during the 1840s and 1850s through conveyance, mortgage or trusteeship, but no development ensued.

During this time John Tooth was declared bankrupt and the Kent Brewery was leased to his nephews, brothers Robert and Edwin Tooth. Subsequently, in 1844, Robert Lucas Tooth was born to Edwin Tooth. After Frederick, the youngest brother, joined the partnership in 1853, the company traded as R.E. & F. Tooth. In 1855, Edwin Tooth returned to England with his family and remained there until his death. Robert Tooth, Edwin's eldest son, returned to Sydney to join the family brewery in 1863, after having spent his formative years in England and completing his education at Eton. During that year Edmund Resch also migrated to Australia from Germany.

=== Development of Swifts by the Tooth Family: 1872–1900 ===
Swifts front gate, c. 1890

Sir Robert Lucas Lucas-Tooth, c. 1890

In 1869 the Darling Point property was transferred by means of mortgage to Francis Mitchell. Mitchell's professional background was in shipping, being for many years in business with Alexander Berry and Edward Wollstonecraft, and he was the senior partner of Messrs Mitchell & Co., ship chandlers and ship owners. Mitchell's business dealings had brought him into contact with Robert Tooth in 1850, one of the partners in the Kent Brewery owned by the Tooth family. Shortly before his death, Mitchell sold the property in around 1872 to Tooth's nephew, Robert Lucas Tooth. The Sands Directory of 1873 already lists Robert Tooth as being the occupier of the Darling Point site. Tooth was subsequently created a baronet in 1906 and was given a Royal licence to assume the name and arms of Lucas-Tooth. From that time he became known as Sir Robert Lucas Lucas-Tooth.

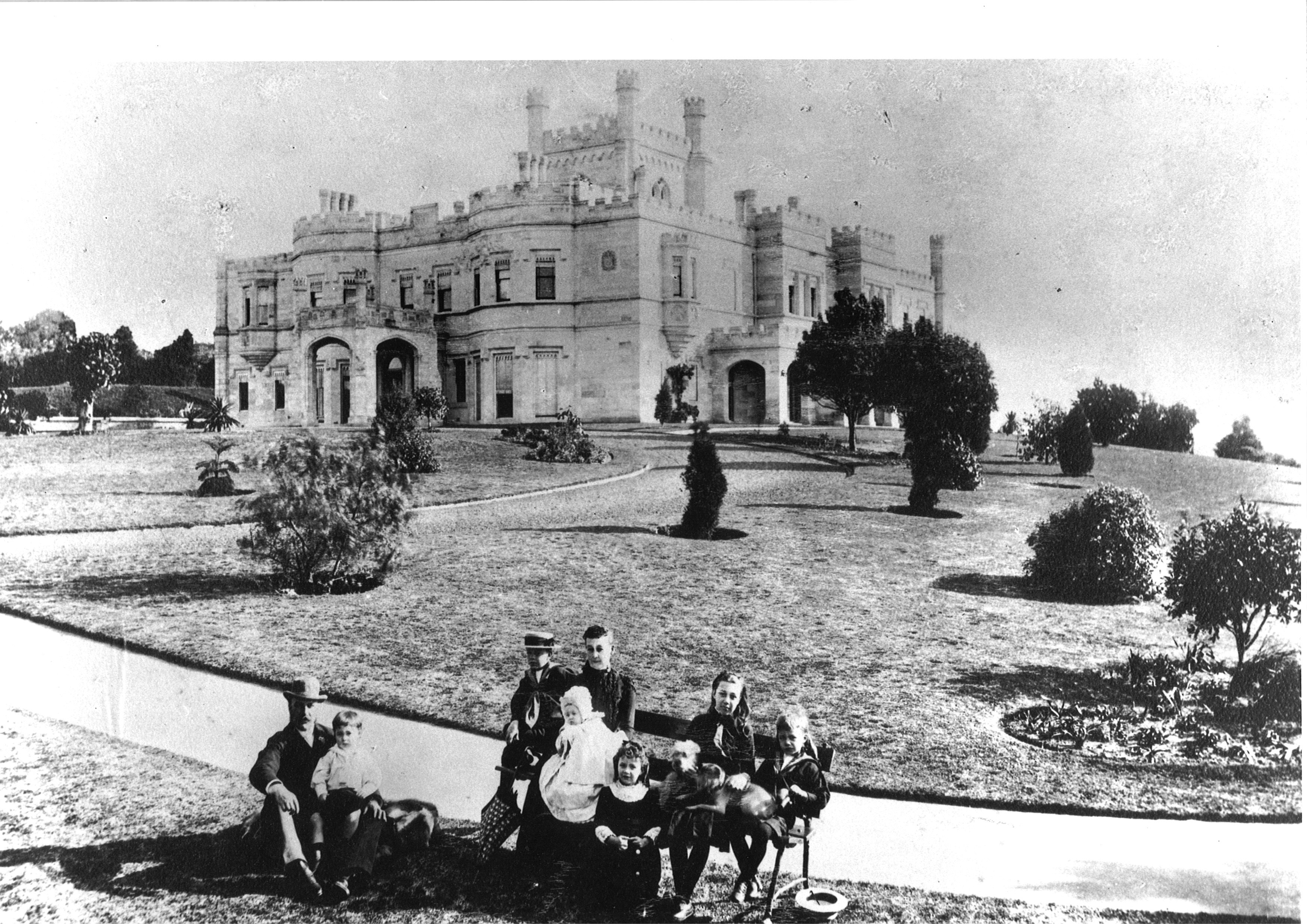
Sir Robert Lucas-Tooth and family posing for a photograph at Swifts, c. 1890

==== Original construction: c. 1873–1882 ====
With ownership of the site from at least 1872, the original plain two-storey portion of Swifts was under construction from c.1873–1875. The revised plans, including the sandstone tower and castellation, as well as other significant extensions, would seem to have been completed in at least 1877. Beatrice Maude, the daughter of Sir Robert Lucas-Tooth and Helen Tooth, laid one of the foundation stones for the remodelling of Swifts on 18 March 1876. The silver trowel was retained by Tooth & Co Ltd and later donated to the Powerhouse Museum in Sydney. The original 1874–1875 house was modelled on the family home in Cranbrook, Kent named "Great Swifts".

==== Expansion: 1882–1900 ====
The 1880s was a boom period throughout the Australian colonies as money from English banks poured in to fuel expansion. The brewery industry at this time also experienced marked growth, with the number of breweries in the state peaking at an all-time high during the 1880s. In Sir Robert Lucas-Tooth's personal life, his stature in colonial society had grown through entering the Parliament of New South Wales in 1880, representing the seat of Monaro in the Legislative Assembly.

In 1882, the prominent French-born Sydney architect Gustavus Alphonse Morrell was engaged by Sir Robert Lucas-Tooth to expand Swifts. The drawings were prepared by J. H. Harvey. Morrell's design for Swifts drew on Sydney's Government House in matters such as sandstone masonry façades, castellations and tower, the long arcade and porte-cochère. In planning the house, Morrell provided a mansion which was as up-to-date as any to be found in England. It was built at a time when servants were mandatory in any household of social status, with cook, kitchen and house maids, butler and footmen, and the management of the grounds and stables required gardeners, coachmen, and grooms. In 1888, Tooth & Co Ltd was formed and Sir Robert Lucas-Tooth was managing director to 1889. Sir Robert Lucas-Tooth and his family then left Sydney in 1889 for England with the remodelled house having only recently been completed. He did, however, make frequent visits to Australia. There is also record of Mr Tooth holidaying at Aldourie Castle, a 7,000 acre estate on the southern banks of Loch Ness in Inverness, Scotland in the summer and autumn months of 1891. Sir Robert Lucas-Tooth was invited to contest one of the northern seats in the United Kingdom's House of Commons in the early 1890s and seems to have used Swifts as a base during his frequent visits back to Sydney. Swifts was leased to the lawyer Henry Harris between 1892 and 1897. In January 1896, a burglary was committed at Swifts when thieves prised open one of the windows next to the main entrance and took property, including jewellery and other portable items to the value of £40. Ernest Burns and John Smith were later found guilty of the theft.

=== Purchase of Swifts by the Resch family: 1900–64 ===
==== Edmund Resch Sr: 1900–28 ====
Edmund Resch Sr c. 1914

In 1900 Swifts was purchased by the German emigrant brewer, Edmund Resch, born in Bavaria in 1847 and who arrived in Australia in 1863 to seek his fortune on the goldfields of Victoria. During the 1870s, Edmund entered into partnership with his younger brother Richard in opening a cordial and aerated water factory. Edmund opened the Lion Brewery in Wilcannia in 1879. Over the next few decades, Edmund and his brothers, Emil and Richard, opened other branches of the Lion Brewery in the region. The partnership dissolved in 1885, with Edmund retaining the Wilcannia operation. Meanwhile, Emil went on to establish Carlton & United Breweries with others.

In 1900, Resch, who had built a Sydney brewing operation in the late 1890s, purchased Swifts. In June 1900, for reasons unknown, the property title was transferred from Edmund to his wife, Carolina, only to be transferred back to Edmund in October of that year. In Resch's ownership, the alterations were confined to some interior redecorating and a tennis court, suggesting Resch was quite content with what they had received courtesy of his business rival, Sir Robert Lucas-Tooth. During the First World War, when anti-German sentiment was rife throughout the country, Edmund contributed generously to the war effort and made up the difference in pay for about sixty employees who had enlisted. In 1909, Edmund and Carolina Resch left for Europe for five years, only to return in 1914. During this time Swifts remained unoccupied apart from the Resch's servants. In 1915, Sir Robert Lucas-Tooth died at his English estate Holme Lacy. The Sydney Morning Herald reported that Sir Robert Lucas-Tooth's last words were: "I would like my work to go on."

Throughout Australia during the First World War the internment of German nationals was common and there was animosity towards anyone of German origin, including the Resch family. In an editorial on 4 March 1916 the Mirror of Australia stated, in a page three editorial, that "The Resch family live at 'Swifts' Darling Point, Sydney, a house which has a commanding view over Sydney Harbor, and could, if so-desired, be easily used for purposes inimical to this country. No German should be permitted to occupy such a residence". Edmund Resch evaded such formal action until November 1917, when Resch was arrested for an 'indiscretion' and interned at Holsworthy Internment Camp for a period of four months until, due to ill health he was transferred back to Swifts where he remained under house arrest, with a guard to ensure he could not leave or receive visitors, until the end of the war. According to reports, the indiscretion involved the flying of a German flag atop Swifts. Edmund Resch died at Swifts on 22 May 1923. Probate of his estate was sworn at £316,828. By April 1924, property title was transferred to Edmund Resch Jr and Arnold Resch as joint tenants.

==== Edmund Resch Jr and Arnold Resch: 1929–63 ====
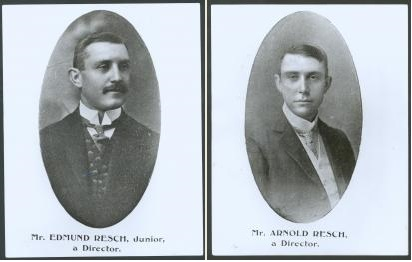
Edmund Jr and Arnold Resch – Brewery Directors

Associated with Edmund Resch Snr in his business were his two sons Edmund Jr (born 1880) and Arnold Gottfried (born 1881). They were educated at the Sydney Church of England Grammar School (Shore School) in North Sydney and Scotch College, Melbourne. Edmund Resch Jr married Florence Mabel Bennett in 1927 and they made Swifts their home until they died (Florence in 1959 and Edmund Resch Jr in 1963). In September 1925 Arnold Resch, who regularly appeared in the social pages of Sydney's newspapers, was the defendant in a sensational £25,000 "Breach of Promise" legal action against him by Madame Andre Vacher Lauzanne, a so-called French beauty who was the proprietor of "an exclusive Sydney salon". This was a highly publicised legal case resulting from the alleged failure to proceed with the matrimonial plans. It was reported that the case "was a cause celebre that rocked Sydney and sent the circulations of the evening press soaring to record heights for several weeks". The salaciousness of the Lauzanne v Resch case and the notoriety of the defendant became the subject of a black and white short film which was a huge hit in cinemas. Following settlement of the Supreme Court of New South Wales legal action, in February 1926 Arnold Resch (then 46 years old) married 21-year-old Tottie (née Dennis) in a private ("doors locked") service at St Mark's Church, Darling Point, which was followed by a reception at the Astor apartments in Macquarie Street. He subsequently purchased the property of Belhaven in Victoria Road Bellevue Hill.

In 1929, the Resch brewery was acquired by Tooth & Co Ltd with the issue of £1,250,000 shares to Edmund Resch Jr and Arnold Resch. The Reschs gave their 500 former employees a gift of £30,000 to be split among them, which was very well received. In August 1929, an unknown assailant (believed to have been a disgruntled Resch's employee opposing the brewery merger) set off dynamite at part of the wall surrounding Swifts. The incident attracted widespread press attention, with the Daily Telegraph reporting it as an "Attempt to Blow Up Darling Point Home – Terrific Explosion Tears Hole in Wall Round Edmund Resch's Mansion".

On Carolina's death at Swifts in 1927, the Resch family brewing empire in New South Wales quickly unravelled as the two sons disagreed over the future direction of the company and of Swifts. Swifts was placed on the market in 1928 owing to the family dispute. In February, the brothers appeared in the Supreme Court of New South Wales, before Chief Justice Harvey, to divide their father's estate and to determine the future ownership of Swifts. In October the "Grand Old Resch Home" was sold at public auction to Edmund Resch Jr. Arnold Resch transferred his undivided moiety in Swifts to Edmund Resch Jr. Arnold Resch retired from the brewery business in 1930. Due to his concerns about the high rate of taxation in New South Wales, on 11 March 1936 Arnold Resch farewelled Australia (aboard the new Orient steam liner the Orion) for Jersey in the Channel Islands together with his wife, Tottie Resch and daughter Vera Caroline (later Le Cras). Following the German occupation of the Channel Islands from 30 June 1940, although an Australian citizen Arnold Resch was removed from his family and the Jersey home that he had acquired, being a grand chateau on 22 acres with orchard and gardens, and was repatriated to Germany where it is believed he died in 1942.

In August 1935 Edmund Resch Jr undertook alterations to improve the living and working conditions of his staff and repair the wall. He commissioned plans by architects Robertson & Marks for new laundries and the gardener's compound. In addition, concrete was placed over the carriage drive and garden paths. The changes made for the servants from the original Tooth-era structures reveal the general employment circumstances of domestic staff in the inter-war era with their diminishing numbers limiting employers' opportunities for engaging and retaining reliable staff. Edmund Resch Jr also redecorated the interiors of the main house in the late 1920s, with much of the heavy flock wallpaper still in situ by the 1990s. Further plans were prepared by architects Robertson & Marks for the retaining wall, lavatory and manure bins. During this period the house continued to feature prominently in pop culture with Women's Weekly running the occasional article of the intimate jottings of tennis parties and balls at the "castle-like home of Mrs Edmund Resch, Darling Point".

==== Swifts during World War II: Hospital for Wounded Soldiers ====
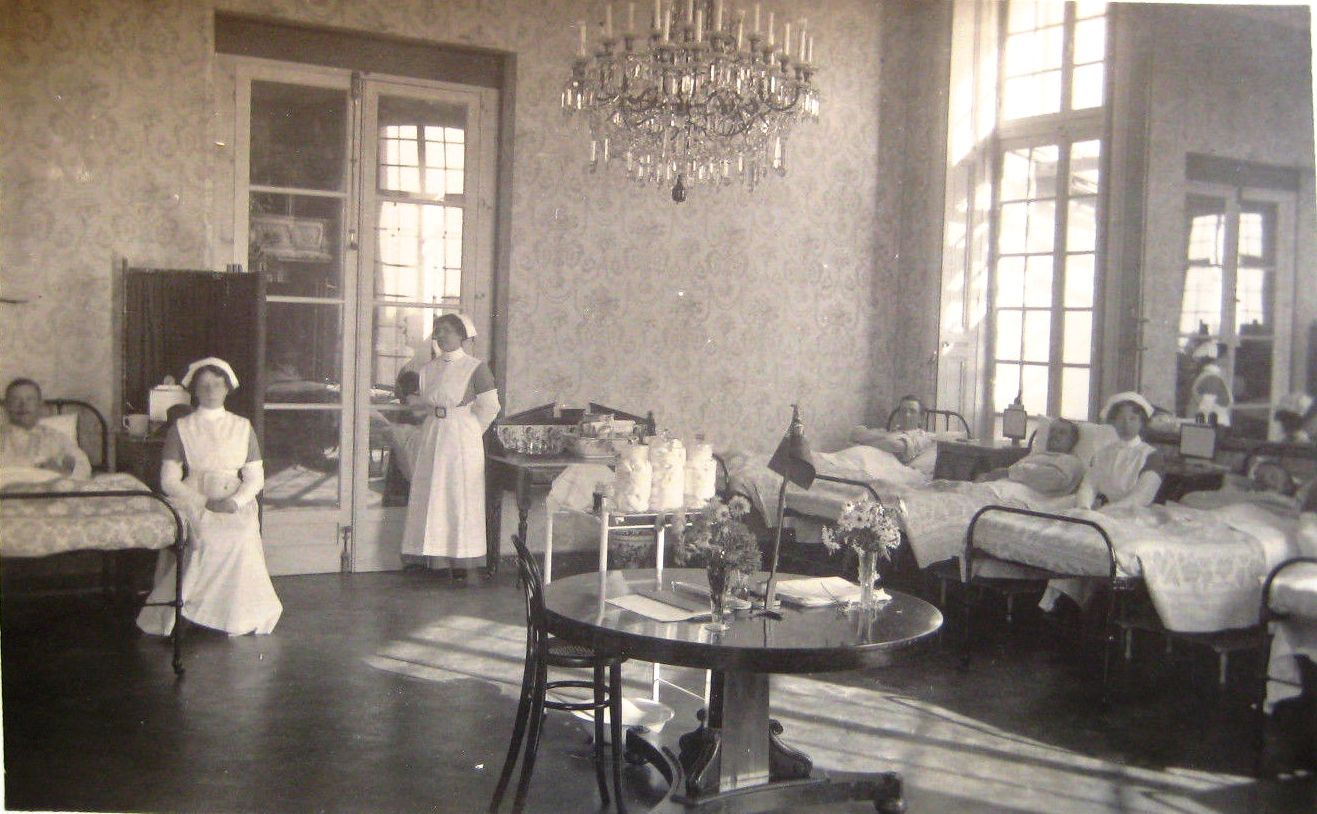
During WW2 the ballroom was converted to a ward for 100 wounded soldiers (as with other stately homes such as Oldway House)

Following the outbreak of the Second World War, based on information from unnamed sources Edmund Resch Jnr was investigated and secretly monitored by Australian Military Police Intelligence. During 1942 there were suspicions of the Reschs engaging in subversive activities, which included making radio transmissions to Germany. These suspicions were never founded, and seem to have been based on anti-German sentiments arising from his name and the fact that he did not associate with his Darling Point neighbours. Edmund Resch Jr was also accused in Parliament of hoarding petrol in the newly installed underground fuel tanks at Swifts.

Rather than aiding the German war effort, during the Second World War the Reschs placed parts of Swifts at the disposal of the local Civilian Aid Service to be used as a rest centre for wounded soldiers. On 26 September 1942 parts of the house were officially opened as The Swifts Rest Centre by the Minister for Labor and Social Services, Mr Hamilton Knight, with a staff of twenty carers including three trained nurses. On 17 September 1942, in an article entitled "Ballroom Transformed into Civilian Aid Centre", the Daily Telegraph reported that "the huge ballroom will accommodate more than 100 people in an emergency" and "we also have the use of two additional rooms for treatment of shock patients", including "bomb-shocked" troops, and was also used by the local Darling Point war effort volunteers as a centre for knitting and sewing quilts and clothing for the Red Cross.

==== Death of Edmund Resch Jr ====
Edmund Resch Jr died at Swifts in November 1963 and left a personal fortune of £6.5 million, at that time being the largest estate ever lodged for probate in Australia. Resch had no children with his late wife Florence Bennett, he was extremely generous to his sister-in-law Clara May Bennett (Duff) and her children who lived with him at Swifts he also had chauffeur and staff of five. Pursuant to his will, he left two-thirds of his estate, including the £253,000 Swifts property, to the Sisters of Charity and the Roman Catholic Church. The bequest was for a period of 200 years so long as the Sisters conducted St Vincent's Private Hospital, Darlinghurst. Resch was a Lutheran but raised as an Anglican so the bequest was unusual in that context but understandable in light of both the fact that his late wife Florence had been a Catholic. With the proceeds of the bequest the Sisters of Charity constructed the new St Vincent's Private Hospital, Darlinghurst, Sydney, which was completed in 1976 and at that time was the most expensive private hospital built in Australia.

=== Bequest of Swifts to the Catholic Church: 1964–86 ===
The next several decades of Swifts as a residence in the mid-twentieth century were associated with it being the home of the Cardinals of the Roman Catholic Archdiocese of Sydney.

In the early stages of the Church's residence the land was subdivided into one lot containing the gardener's house (originally known as 'The Bungalow') and another lot comprising the main house, other outbuildings and grounds. The Bungalow was held in trust by The Perpetual Trustee Company Ltd with the title intended to revert to the Catholic Church on the death of the Resch's gardener. Some alterations were made to the house for the Catholic Church by architects S. G. Hirst & Kennedy. The former ballroom was converted for use as a chapel-of-ease (named St Edmunds in honour of Edmund Resch Jr) that seated 200 and had standing room for about 60 people. Alterations were made to improve services in 1965 and some redecoration but throughout this period the furniture appears to have changed little from what the Resch family had left. That same year, 1964, Cardinal Gilroy moved into Swifts as the official residence of the Archbishop of Sydney. During the first-ever Papal visit to Australia in 1970, Pope Paul VI was accommodated at Swifts as the guest of Cardinal Gilroy. Pope John Paul II also stayed at Swifts during his 1986 visit (hosted by Cardinal Clancy).

Resch's final testament effectively preserved Swifts and its grounds from demolition and subdivision at a time when most grand houses in Darling Point were being demolished for high-rise home unit developments. The conditional gift to the Church removed both the possibility of sale and demolition for 20 years after Edmund Resch Jr's death.

In 1967, Vera Le Cras, the daughter of Arnold and Tottie Resch, undertook a protracted legal battle in the Supreme Court of New South Wales, and later before the Judicial Committee of the Privy Council in London, to (unsuccessfully) argue that Edmund Resch Jr's bequest of two-thirds of the residuary estate to the Sisters of Charity to build a private hospital (St Vincent's Private Hospital) was not a valid charitable gift, and the estate should therefore have passed to her as next of kin.

Upon his retirement in 1971, Cardinal Gilroy was succeeded by Cardinal James Darcy Freeman, who also used Swifts as the official residence of the Archbishop of Sydney. Cardinal Freeman was one of Cardinal Gilroy's protégés, having served many years as his private secretary, and continued his predecessor's residence in, and use of, Swifts. Cardinal Freeman's use of Swifts was the longest of the three cardinals. Freeman, on his retirement in 1983, in turn was succeeded by his protégé, Cardinal Edward Bede Clancy who also resided in Swifts.

Until 1983 the house and grounds had been essentially the private domain of the Tooth and Resch families and the Catholic Church hierarchy, with use of the chapel for masses and weddings. The future premier of New South Wales, The Hon. Bob Carr, was married to Helena John there in 1973. Some interest in the property was elicited by the press in the early 1960s as the details of Edmund Resch Jr's bequest to the Catholic Church became public. This intensified in the 1980s when the future was debated and discussed by government and the general public.

==== Swifts becomes heritage-listed: 1983–84 ====
By early 1983 the NSW Heritage Council proposed to place a permanent conservation order on the property under the Heritage Act 1977 (NSW). Faced with objections by the Catholic Church a Commission of Inquiry was initiated in August 1983. The Church's final view was that listing should not include the western portion of the grounds. Opposing the Church was a plethora of witnesses and the NSW Heritage Council's own in-house heritage experts who collectively drew attention to the architectural, historic and landscape values of the property as a late Victorian harbour-side mansion. A permanent conservation order, made under the Heritage Act 1977, was placed on the property in April 1984. Swifts is now listed on the New South Wales State Heritage Register.

=== Swifts falls into disrepair: 1986–97 ===
Aerial photograph of Swifts in a state of disrepair

In 1986 the property was transferred for a reputed $9 million from the Roman Catholic Church to Minjar Holdings Pty Ltd, the family company of horse trainer and investor Carl Spies. On the same day Minjar Holdings executed a mortgage for $5 million back to the Catholic Church. The sale price was the highest for a residence ever paid in Australia up to that time.

By the early 1990s, the boom of the 1980s had turned to bust, with many investors facing financial ruin. Spies was pursued through the Supreme Court of New South Wales for non-payment of mortgage repayments owed to a number of mortgagees, including the Catholic Church. In 1990 the Spies were evicted by order of the Supreme Court and 450 pieces of furniture were sold at auction in October 1992. Throughout this period Swifts fell into disrepair. Substantial parts of the exterior sandstone walls of the house and gardens, as well as the roofing, become seriously dilapidated. The leaking roof, including a fully collapsed part of it above the main staircase, caused significant damage to the already neglected interiors.

With Swifts facing serious and permanent destruction, the NSW Heritage Council, Woollahra Municipal Council and local residents became involved in opposing the redevelopment of the estate. Swifts was eventually placed on the market by St George Bank Ltd as the mortgagee-in-possession for sale by tender in late 1996, and again in mid-1997 for sale by public auction. No sale was recorded at the auction.

=== Purchase and restoration by the Moran Family: 1997–present ===
In April 1997, Swifts was purchased by the Moran family, operators of private health and aged care facilities, for a reputed $12 million. The Moran family engaged the experienced conservation and heritage architect Clive Lucas of Clive Lucas, Stapleton & Partners to take on the mammoth task of restoring the derelict house. This involved extensive stone and roofing reconstruction, repairing the collapsed ceilings and restoration of the interior paintwork. Drawing on the expertise of builders and decorators skilled in traditional techniques, the restoration of Swifts, undertaken between 1997 and 2012, was probably the largest and most expensive of its type for private family use in Sydney. The restoration of Swifts in its historical veracity (inclusive of furniture and furnishing) and scale of restoration has precedents only in the projects by the National Trust of Australia and Historic Houses Trust undertaken at public expense for the benefit of the community of New South Wales.

The original Conservation Analysis and Conservation Guidelines report for Swifts noted the vast size, quality of craftsmanship and the intricacy of planning illustrating the complex arrangements required for masters and servants in the late nineteenth century. This has not been lost in the restoration, and the house retains its major reception rooms, entrance hall, drawing room, morning room, smoking room, dining room, and complement of service rooms, kitchen scullery, pantry, butlers' rooms, silver safe, store, wine cellar, housemaid's room, linen room, servants' bedrooms and common areas. Outside there are still the meat rooms, dairy and laundry, and the original stable, double carriage house and tack room.

The restoration of Swifts, undertaken with NSW Heritage Council's approval, emphasised the original 1870s Tooth-period of ownership over the later Resch family era. This was due in part to the high rate of survival of evidence for the decorative paint finishes under the twentieth century accretions and the photographic record of the principal rooms made around 1900. The house has become a form of homage to both High Victorian good taste and Sir Robert Lucas-Tooth.

The restoration of Swifts provided valuable new evidence for the lifestyle of the master and servants in the late nineteenth century, in particular, the quality and range of decorative wall finishes of the principal rooms and fittings of the servants' service areas. There is insight in the preference for Oriental exoticism in the women's boudoir (or Moorish smoking room) and the preference for particular classical composers (in the ballroom).

Swifts is considered one of the most detailed Victorian interiors in Sydney and the Moorish smoking room is believed to be unique in Australia. Halfway through some of the interior restoration works in 1998, a tornado swept along the Darling Point ridge destroying much of the restored roofing and decorative painting, both of which had to be redone. Restoration of the grounds was also carried out with the assistance of Sydney-based architect and historian Dr James Broadbent.

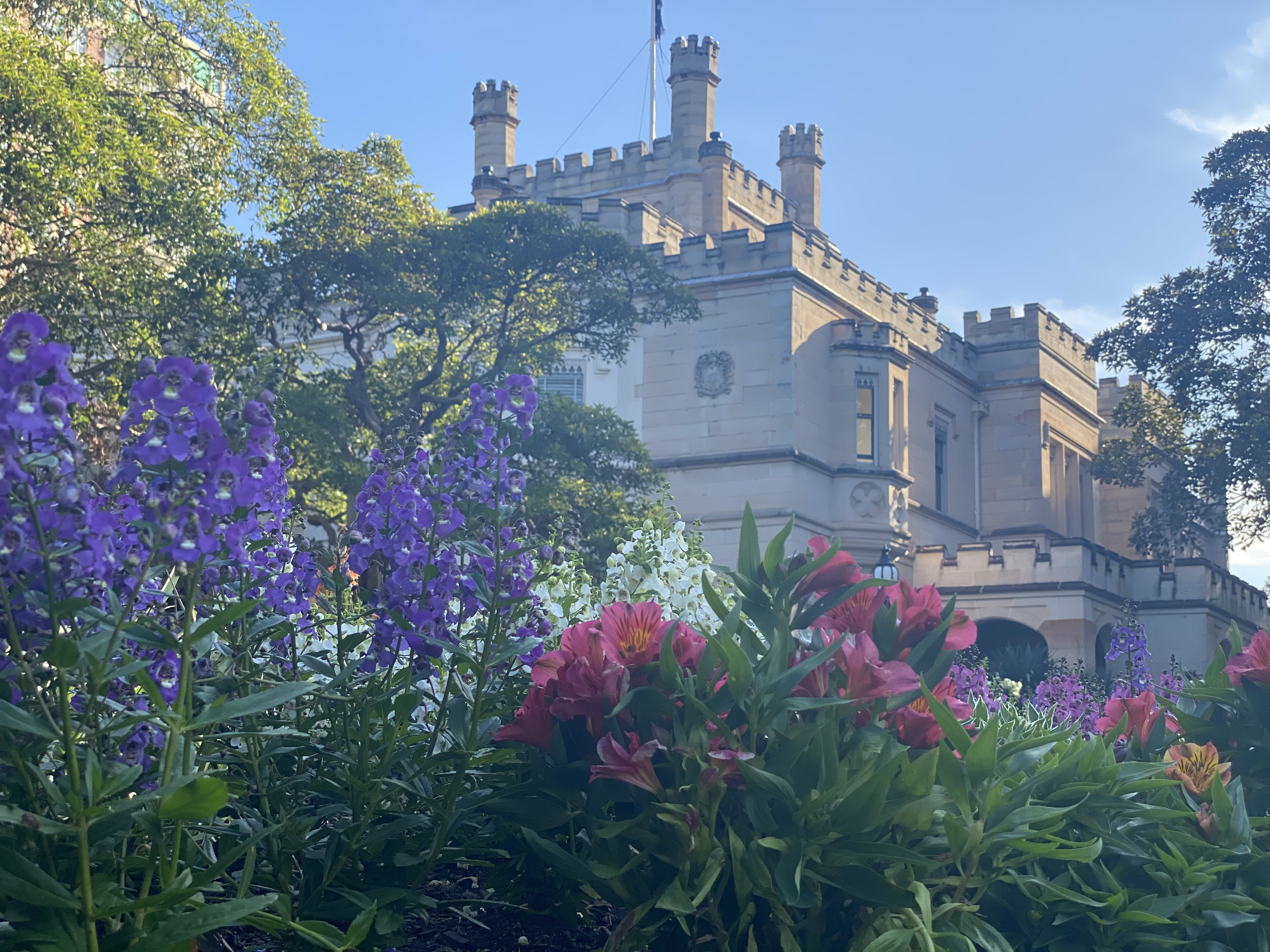
Swifts Mansion in its current restored form

In 2013, Dr Shane Moran bought out the last remaining Moran family interests in the property and became the sole proprietor of Swifts. Dr Moran and his wife Penelope (née Dunbar) were married in 1998 at St Mark's Church, Darling Point, with their reception held in the then partly renovated Swifts' grounds and ballroom.

Dr Moran is a descendant of Thomas Barker who acquired the original land grant upon which Swifts was built in 1833.

Throughout his ownership, Dr Moran has continued to undertake extensive restoration works on Swifts. The works have included the addition of a new conservatory off the service wing and the construction of a swimming pool. Extensive works to the grounds and gardens were also undertaken. Sir Robert Lucas-Tooth's desire for his "work to go on" was not in vain. He has also been involved in the restoration of another important national and state heritage property, the 1840s Darling House, Millers Point.

== Heritage and cultural significance of Swifts ==
=== Heritage significance ===
In December 2012, Swifts was awarded the Lachlan Macquarie Award for Heritage by the Australian Institute of Architects for the finest restoration project in Australia.

Swifts is significant as a unique Australian translation of a Gothic or Old English style upper-middle class country house of the late nineteenth century picturesquely perched at the tip of Darling Point on Sydney Harbour. The house is impressive for its scale and use of sandstone masonry in the Gothic or Old English style of architecture, planning and decorative embellishments and is one of the grandest castellated mansions in New South Wales. Moreover, Swifts is of both New South Wales State and Australian heritage significance, as apart from Government House, Sydney, it is the largest remaining Victorian Gothic Revival house in Australia. There is considerable diversity of the decorative styles used in the respective rooms, with the ballroom and its hallway being the work of Lyon, Cottier & Co., Sydney (the leading firm of art decorators in the last quarter of the nineteenth century). The Moorish smoking room (opium den), the upper hall and the vestibule walls and ceiling are also their work – and most likely some of the other rooms. It is also likely that John Clay Beeler, an American trained art decorator then working in Sydney, who went on to decorate the interior of Melbourne's International Exhibition building for the 1888 Centenary, undertook work in the interior decoration. The copy of Guido Reni's Aurora in the sopraporte is believed to be the work of the Italian decorator in Sydney Signor Lorenzini, who regarded Reni as a master Italian artist from the early seventeenth century.

Swifts remains on its original grounds and still consists of much of the 19th-century landscape, statuary, terrace wall, stairs and paths.

Swifts Mansion, photo taken at dusk following completion of the restoration

=== Cultural significance ===
Swifts demonstrated a unique phase in Australia's colonial history with the rise of an upper-middle class, exemplified by Sir Robert Lucas-Tooth, whose wealth was generated through brewing as well as agriculture, commerce and industry. With its almost intact historic curtilage, Swifts and its garden setting are rare survivors, arguably owing to the long occupation by, and benevolence of, the Resch family. Its iconic status in Australia's cultural heritage has been supported through the extensive conservation program of Dr Shane Moran. Swifts' connection with the Roman Catholic Church is also of social significance as it was home to three cardinals: Gilroy, Freeman and Clancy.

The gardens at Swifts are significant as a distinctive cultural landscape associated with individuals and families important in the development of Sydney and of New South Wales. It is a particularly fine example of a landscaped garden developed in the late nineteenth and early twentieth century reflecting particular design trends and planting styles. The special relationship of the grounds to the house is a significant factor in determining the status of the grounds as an item of environmental heritage.

=== Stained Glass Window ===
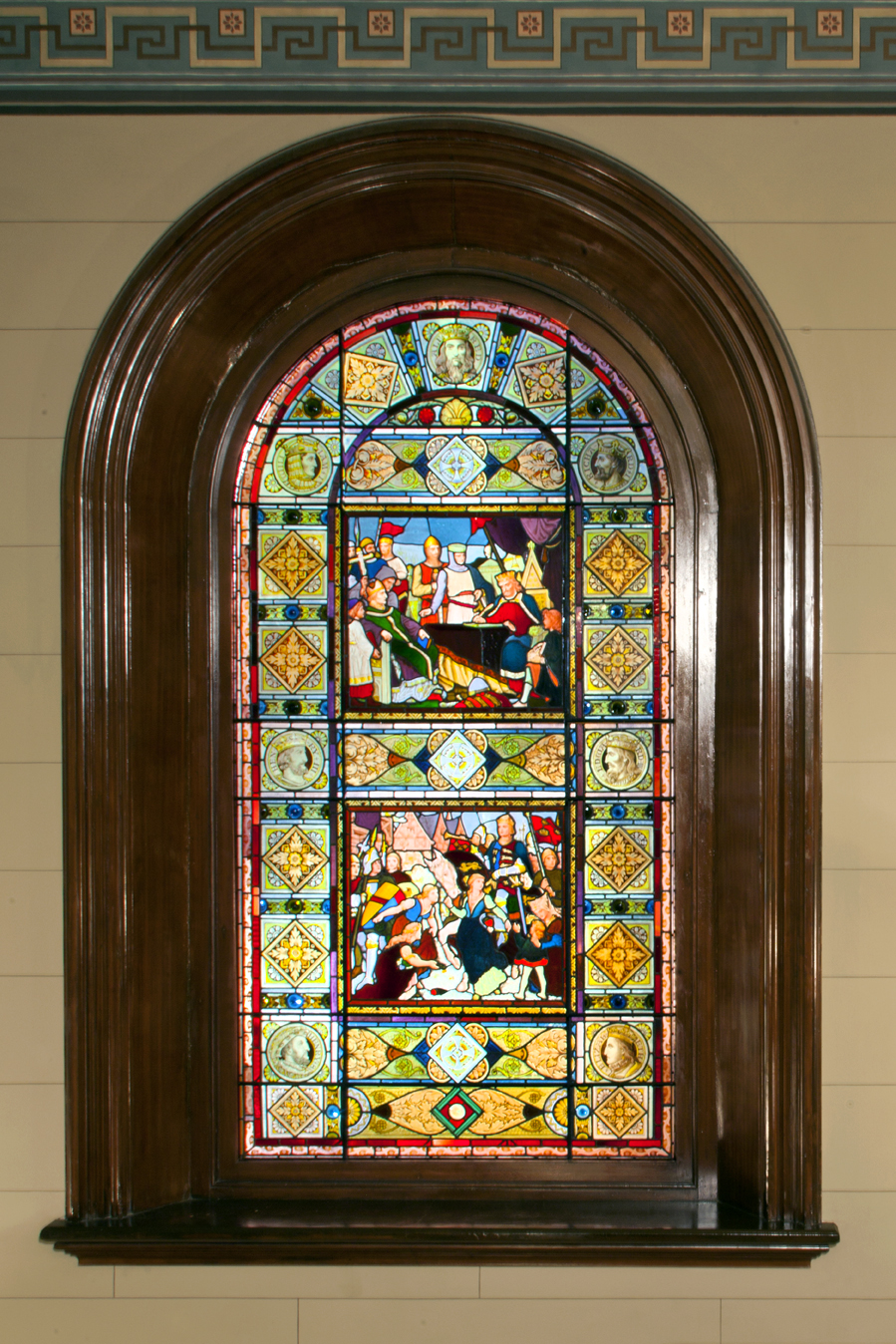
1880s original stained glass window situated above main staircase at Swifts

The large original 1880s arch stained glass window, situated above the main staircase and believed to be the work of Lyon, Cottier & Co Sydney, has also been fully restored. It depicts, above, King John of England signing Magna Carta on 15 June 1215 at Runnymede, near Windsor. Below is King Henry V of England following his victory against the numerically superior French army at the Battle of Agincourt in 1415 (which boosted English morale and prestige, crippled France, and started a new period of English dominance in the Hundred Years' War).

=== Fincham & Hobday Organ ===
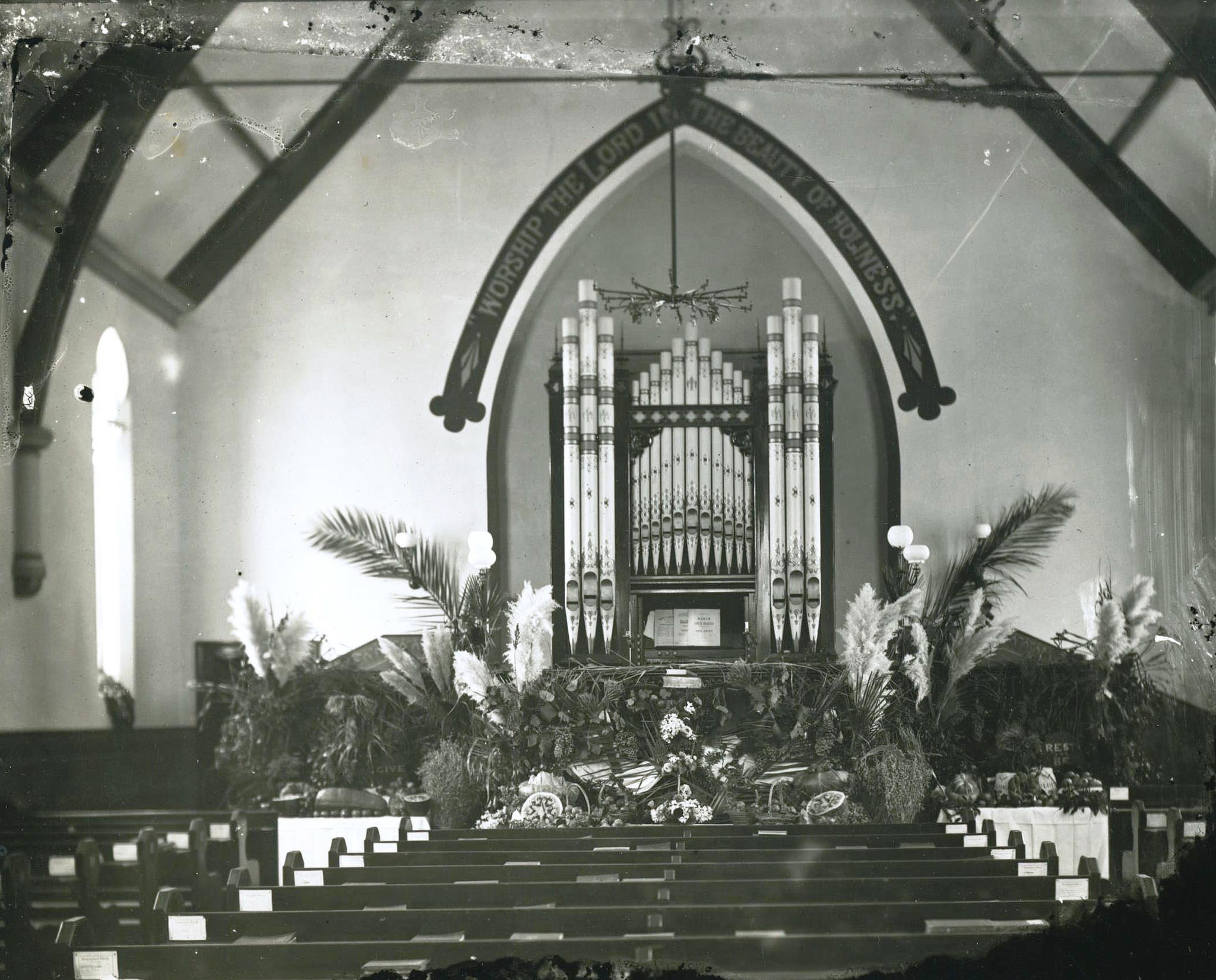
Organ in situ at Gawler

In an article on "Society Doings in Sydney", dated 6 September 1902 from The Australasian Newspaper, there is a description of the home as follows: "Swifts is a handsome mansion with towers, situated at the end of Darling Point. One of its attractions is a ballroom, with a dado, on which are painted the portraits of eminent musicians. In a raised alcove there is an orchestral organ (the largest of its kind in Sydney), which plays like a musical box when wound up. The guests [of the reception held by Mr and Mrs Resch in honour of the Queen of Holland] were interested in inspecting the organ, and listening to operatic selections". It is believed that the original orchestral pipe organ was from the Welte Company of Freiburg in Germany.

On 1 December 2016, Dr. Shane Moran installed an historic Australian made Fincham & Hobday pipe organ into the organ chamber. The organ was built in 1885 by Fincham & Hobday, Adelaide for the Congregational Church, Gawler, South Australia. The façade of the organ was decorated by the firm of H. L. Vosz. In 2011 the organ was gifted to the Organ Historical Trust of Australia. In 2015, Dr and Mrs Moran purchased the organ and engaged Hargraves Pipe Organs Pty Ltd of Mt Evelyn, Victoria, to undertake substantial restoration work over the course of more than a year, resulting in the organ being restored to its former grandeur.

Out of a total of eleven new organs constructed by Fincham & Hobday during the 19th century, this is one of only three instruments by the Adelaide firm to survive intact, retaining its original mechanical key and stop actions, pipework, casework with carved detail and attached console. It is the only example of its work to be found outside South Australia. It is of considerable significance for its outstanding quality of workmanship and choice of materials, its delightful sound, and the retention of the original façade pipe decoration. The superior mechanical and tonal style of the organ has been strongly influenced by the 1877 Hill & Son organ in the Adelaide Town Hall, which the firm worked upon, and differs considerably from the firm's Melbourne productions. The organ was opened at Gawler on 13 September 1885 and was enlarged by Fincham & Hobday to two manuals in 1888.

=== Heritage listing ===
As at 10 March 2009, Swifts is of State significance as, apart from Government House in Sydney, it is the largest remaining Victorian Gothic Revival house in Australia. Swifts remains on its original grounds and still consists of the original landscape, statuary, terrace wall, stairs and paths. It is a prime example of how the upper-class people lived in the 19th century in Australia. Swifts is also of cultural significance as it was home of two well known Sydney business families, the Lucas-Tooth and Resch families. Swifts connection with the Roman Catholic Church is also of social significance as it was home to three cardinals; Gilroy, Freeman and Clancy. The building is also significant because it is an example of the work of Gustauus Alphose Morell, a prominent Sydney architect in the late 19th century.

The western section of the garden of Swifts formed an integral part of the original design of the grounds. The special relationship of the grounds to the mansion is a significant factor in determining the status of the grounds as an item of environmental heritage. The building together with its site is an item of environmental heritage (excerpt from "Findings" of Commissioner of Inquiry, 1983, p. 55).

Swifts was listed on the New South Wales State Heritage Register on 2 April 1999 having satisfied the following criteria.

The place has a strong or special association with a person, or group of persons, of importance of cultural or natural history of New South Wales's history.

Swifts is of State significance for its associations with two brewing families – the Tooths who built the house and the Reschs who subsequently lived in it.

Swifts is of State significance as the official residence of three cardinals: Gilroy, Freeman and Clancy.

The place is important in demonstrating aesthetic characteristics and/or a high degree of creative or technical achievement in New South Wales.

Swifts is of State significance as a unique ensemble of late-Victorian house and extensive landscaped ground, complete with statuary, balustrade terrace wall, stairs, paths, mature trees that, in their picturesque setting within the foreshores of Sydney harbour, epitomises the development of "taste" in nineteenth century colonial New South Wales.

The place possesses uncommon, rare or endangered aspects of the cultural or natural history of New South Wales.

Swifts is of significance as a rare example of the work of architect Gustavus Alphose Morell.

The place is important in demonstrating the principal characteristics of a class of cultural or natural places/environments in New South Wales.

Swifts is of State significance as Sydney's largest and most intact late Victorian mansion. With the exception of Government House, it illustrates the complex planning and detail thought necessary for an upper-class family at the end of the nineteenth century. this includes the total ensemble of house, service rooms, outhouses and grounds.

== Swifts in popular culture ==
Although currently a private home, Swifts is regularly featured in films and hosts distinguished cultural and charitable events. These have included the following:

- Swifts was the set location in 2022 and 2023 for Disney's Australian mini-series The Artful Dodger starring Thomas Brodie-Sangster taking the role of "Jack Hawkins" aka "the Artful Dodger", David Thewlis as Fagin and Maia Mitchell as "Lady Belle Fox".
- Swifts was the feature article in April 2023 Wish Magazine publication titled Grand Designs – Inside one of the most ambitions home renovations in Australian history.
- Celebrity Wedding: On 29 April 2023, Swifts was the venue for the wedding ceremony and wedding reception of the owner's family friend Australian radio host and television personality, Kyle Sandilands and Tegan Kynaston. The wedding was attended by high-profile political figures such as the current Australian Prime Minister Anthony Albanese and the current New South Wales Premier Chris Minns. The exclusive guest list included Today show host Karl Stefanovic and his wife Jasmine; Kings Cross nightclub identity John Ibrahim and his model girlfriend Sarah Budge; and singer Guy Sebastian and his stylist wife Jules, Australian boxer Jeff Fenech and his wife Suzee; NRL player-turned-TV host Beau Ryan and wife Kara; and Sandilands' long-time radio co-host Jackie 'O' Henderson.
- The gardens of Swifts hosted the wedding ceremony of Melissa and Josh in Married at First Sight's Season 10.
- Swifts featured as the home of lead antagonist Ezra Shipman (played by Tim Roth) in the 2022 Australian drama mini-series 'Last King of the Cross'. Last King of the Cross was inspired by the autobiography of nightclub identity John Ibrahim and depicted the story of gangs who battled for control in Sydney's Kings Cross. The mini-series was produced by HELIUM production and was released on Paramount + in February 2023.
- In May 2022, Bvlgari unveiled its new MAGNIFICA high-end jewellery and high-end watch collection in an exclusive private event hosted by the owners at Swifts. The collection including the Imperial Spinel necklace which features 131.24 carat spinel gemstone as well as the Diva's Dream necklace with a 15 carat cabochon-cut rubellite set in pink gold which were on display in the Swifts ballroom for invited VIP guests
- The Sydney Art Quartet collaborated with Champagne Maison Perrier-Jouët to host La Belle Epoque concerts in the ballroom of Swifts in March 2022. The 'extraordinary romantic estate' setting was described as 'the perfect location to experience the magical pairing of live quartet music and Perrier-Jouët's intricate and delicate champagne style - for which it is famous throughout the world'.
- Netflix's 2022 American thriller drama series Pieces of Her, starring Australian actor Toni Collette used Swifts as one of the location sets.
- During Sir Elton John's extended stay in Australia during his 2019–2020 Farewell Yellow Brick Road tour, the Swifts tennis court was reported to be the location "where the tennis-mad star served up some aces during his three-month Sydney sojourn"
- Celebrity Wedding: The wedding ceremony of friends of the owners, Australian representative rugby union legend, Kurtley Beale and Maddi Bloomberg took place in the gardens of Swifts on 25 July 2020.
- In March 2020 and March 2021, Swifts hosted the Sydney Harbour Concours d'Élégance. During the three-day event, the grounds of Swifts was used to showcase a combination of past and present automobiles which the press described as "some of the most exclusive and valuable vehicles gathered in the Southern Hemisphere". Amount the rare offerings on display were a magnificent 1950 Bristol 402, 1954 Muntz Jet, 1964 Ferrari 250GT Berlinetta Lusso and 1970 Lamborghini Miura S.
- Swifts has regularly been donated as the venue to host numerous charitable, church, and school functions including the 2019 Silver Party for the Kids Cancer Centre at Sydney Children's Hospital: a black tie event which was held at on 8 March 2019, and raised over $1m for the charity; the inaugural Stand Tall Lunch hosted by Angie Farr Jones in September 2019; Wolper Jewish Hospital's Music recital concert in June 2019, Wolper Jewish Hospital's 'An evening with former Australian Prime Minister, The Hon Malcolm Turnbull on 30 June 2019; St Andrew's Cathedral Choir's fundraising dinner in October 2019.
- Fashion Runways: MacGraw Fashion Collection during Mercedes-Benz Fashion Week in May 2018. Swifts served as the runway for the MacGraw Fashion Collection and the launch of the Dior Cruise Collection in October 2019.
- Fashion Campaign: One Generation, One Family, One Westfield (Sibling Agency/The Otto Empire, March 2017): Westfield 2017 Autumn/Winter Fashion Season: Swifts was the location of the setting for the Westfield Autumn/Winter 2017 fashion campaign. featuring Barry Humphries as his character Dame Edna Everage.
- In November 2017 Swifts hosted Wolper Jewish Hospital's evening with the former professional Australian rules footballer and Aboriginal Australian leader "In Conversation with Adam Goodes"
- Television Series: Unreal Estate: Episode 5 (Nine Network, 2016): Swifts was one of the feature houses in the Australian television series' episode entitled "Grand Mansions" which aired on 25 October 2016 to a national Australian audience.
- Celebrity Wedding: Sunny Wang and Dominique Choy, December 2015: The famous international singer Dominique Choy (a close family friend of the current owners) was married to the well known Taiwanese actor Sunny Wang in December 2015.
- Short Film: Harold Holt – The Defector (Singularity Films, 2015): A short film satirising the disappearance of Prime Minister Harold Holt in 1967.
- Telemovie: Mary – The Making of a Princess (FremantleMedia Australia, 2015): Swifts is featured as the Amalienborg Palace, Copenhagen, Denmark.
- Telemovie: Peter Allen: Not The Boy Next Door (Shine Productions, 2015): The telemovie chronicling the life of Peter Allen was filmed in early 2015 and featured Joel Jackson as Peter Allen, Sarah West, Rebecca Gibney, Sigrid Thornton and Henri Szeps.
- Television series: Swifts has become a regular feature on the Australian drama A Place To Call Home (Seven Network (2013–18). The house and griybds were featured throughout the six series as the Swanson Mansion, residence of Mrs Prudence Swanson and Andrew Swanson Esq.
- Jack Daniel's – Master Distiller Dinner (2012): Following the successful Jack Daniel's Embassy tour, Jeff Arnett, Jack Daniel's Master Distiller, was invited to a very special dinner. The event took place at Swifts. Celebrity chef Luke Mangan created and prepared the courses on site, accompanied by matching cocktails. The film captures the glamour and atmosphere of Swifts.
- Swifts Soirées 2012: Swifts played host to the inaugural Concert Series in Support of the Opera Foundation Australia in 2012. The Swifts ballroom has a sprung dance floor, excellent acoustics and decorative art featuring musicians including Mozart and Strauss. 2012 featured some of the finest music and musicians in Australia. All performances were held in the Grand Ballroom. This was the first time Swifts has been opened for public music performances since the Moran family's restoration of Swifts. The performances included those of the Sydney Omega Ensemble, Katie Noonan, James Morrison and Amelia Farrugia.
- Television series: Swifts was used as the main filming location for the BBC One and ABC 2023 comedy Queen of Oz starring Catherine Tate who plays the Queen of Australia. Swifts doubled as Macquarie House, the Queen's official Australian residence.

== See also ==
- Australian residential architectural styles
