= Paul Barrow =

English rugby league footballer

Personal information
- Full name: Paul Barrow
- Born: 20 October 1974 (age 50)
- Height: 6 ft 1 in (1.85 m)
- Weight: 16 st 0 lb (102 kg)

Playing information
- Position: Second-row
Club
| Years | Team | Pld | T | G | FG | P |
|---|---|---|---|---|---|---|
| 1993–95 | Swinton | 39 | 11 | 0 | 0 | 44 |
| 1995–97 | Warrington | 19 | 2 | 0 | 0 | 8 |
| 1998–00 | Swinton Lions | 70 | 15 | 0 | 0 | 60 |
| | Total | 128 | 28 | 0 | 0 | 112 |
- Source: As of 8 December 2016

Paul Barrow (born 20 October 1974) is a former professional rugby league footballer who played in the 1990s and 2000s. He played at club level for Swinton Lions (two spells), and Warrington Wolves, as a second-row.

== Playing career ==
Paul Barrow made his début for Warrington Wolves on Friday 15 December 1995, and he played his last match for Warrington Wolves on Sunday 8 June 1997.

== Professional career ==
Paul Barrow enjoyed a career in the construction management and delivery industry boasting high profile clients working on several high end homes.
