= Peter Carrington (rugby) =

English rugby league footballer

Personal information
- Full name: Peter Carrington
- Born: unknown

Playing information

Rugby union
- Position: Hooker
Club
Years	Team	Pld	T	G	FG	P
≤Nov 1966– Nov 1966	Ormskirk RUFC

Rugby league
- Position: Hooker
Club
Years	Team	Pld	T	G	FG	P
Nov 1966– Apr 1969	Warrington	26	2	0	0	6
- As of 12 December 2016

Peter Carrington (birth unknown) is a former rugby union and professional rugby league footballer who played in the 1960s. He played club level rugby union (RU) for Ormskirk RUFC, as a hooker, and club level rugby league (RL) for Warrington, as a hooker.
