= James Starkey =

English rugby league footballer

Personal information
- Full name: James Starkey

Playing information
- Position: Centre
Club
Years	Team	Pld	T	G	FG	P
1921	Warrington	3	0	0	0	0
- As of 12 December 2016

James Starkey was a professional rugby league footballer who played in the 1920s. He played at club level for Warrington, as a centre.

== Playing career ==
=== Club career ===
James Starkey made his début for Warrington on Saturday 26 March 1921, and he played his last match for Warrington on Saturday 2 April 1921.
