= Rugby Museum =

Rugby Museum may refer to:

- Rugby Art Gallery and Museum, a local history museum and gallery in the English town of Rugby, Warwickshire
- New Zealand Rugby Museum, a museum dedicated to the sport of rugby union, in Palmerston North, NZ
- Rugby League Heritage Centre, a museum of Rugby League in Huddersfield, England, between 2005 and 2013
- National Rugby League Museum, a museum of Rugby League planned for Bradford, England
- Webb Ellis Rugby Football Museum, a museum dedicated to the sport of rugby football in Rugby, Warwickshire
- World Rugby Museum, based at Twickenham rugby union stadium in south west London
