= Rugby in the United Kingdom =

Rugby in the United Kingdom could refer to the following:

- Rugby, England
- Rugby School

== Rugby football ==
Note that for rugby purposes Ireland plays as a single unit, but the constituent nations of the UK are organised separately:

- Rugby league in the United Kingdom
  - Rugby league in England
  - Rugby league in Ireland
  - Rugby league in Scotland
  - Rugby league in Wales
- Rugby union in the United Kingdom
  - Rugby union in England
  - Rugby union in Ireland
  - Rugby union in Scotland
  - Rugby union in Wales
