= Rugby in England =

Rugby in England may refer to:

- Rugby union in England
- Rugby league in England
- Rugby, Warwickshire, a town in England, namesake of the sport of rugby football
