= Rugby league in the British Isles =

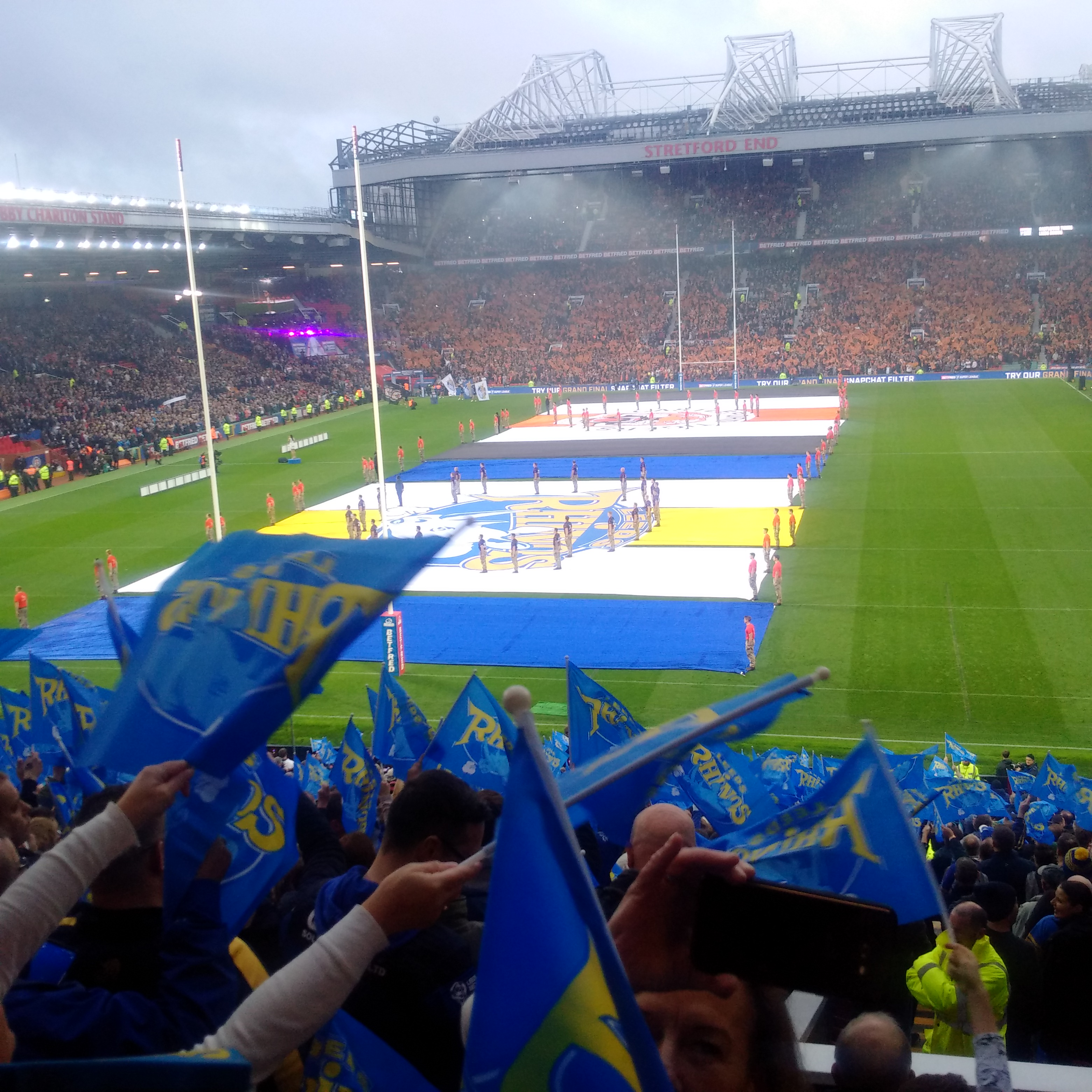
- Pre-match at the 2017 Super League Grand Final
- Country: Great Britain and Ireland
- Governing body: Rugby Football League (Note: Historically has governed the whole of the UK, currently has limited presence in Scotland and Wales and Jointly administers the Great Britain national rugby league team.); Scotland Rugby League (Note: Jointly administers the Great Britain national rugby league team.); Wales Rugby League; Rugby League Ireland
- National teams: Great Britain men's team Great Britain women's team Teams of the Home Nations (Note: England national rugby league team, England women's national rugby league team, Scotland national rugby league team, Scotland women's national rugby league team, Wales national rugby league team, Wales women's national rugby league team, Ireland national rugby league team, Ireland women's national rugby league team.)
- First played: 1895; 131 years ago

National competitions
- Rugby League World Cup

Club competitions
- Professional Leagues; Super League; Championship; League 1 Cups; Challenge Cup; 1895 Cup

Rugby league is played across England, Ireland, Scotland and Wales, but its heartland in parts of Northern England is where the sport is most popular, and is where the majority of professional clubs are based. The sport was first established in the George Hotel, Huddersfield, where 22 clubs split from the Rugby Football Union to form the Northern Rugby Football Union.

Rugby league in the British Isles is discussed in the following articles, corresponding to the separate organisations governing the sport:

- Rugby league in England
- Rugby league in Ireland
- Rugby league in Scotland
- Rugby league in Wales

However, areas where the sport is similar between the Home Nations will be discussed in this article.

== History ==
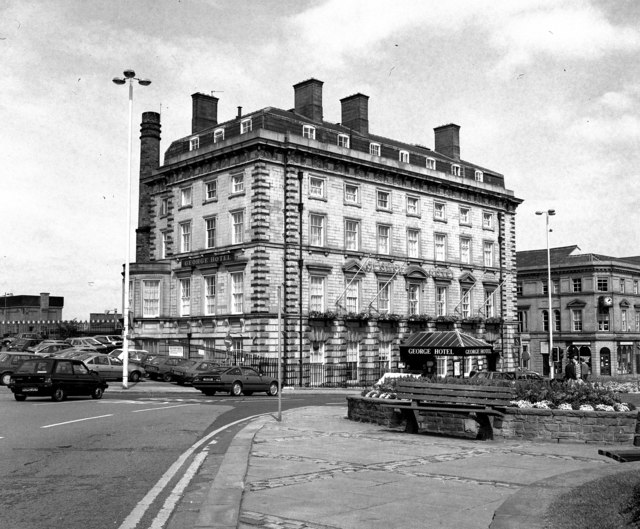
The George Hotel, Huddersfield - the birthplace of rugby league

Rugby league was born in the British Isles, specifically at the George Hotel, Huddersfield in 1895 when the Northern Rugby Football Union broke away from the Rugby Football Union out of a desire to professionalise the game. This year gave birth to the first rugby league season where Manningham were crowned first ever Champions. However following this a national league would not be played until 1901 in favour of county's leagues. In 1897, the Challenge Cup was formed which saw Batley win the first ever cup title. 1902 saw the county's leagues split into two tiers which were now being played in addition to the national league.

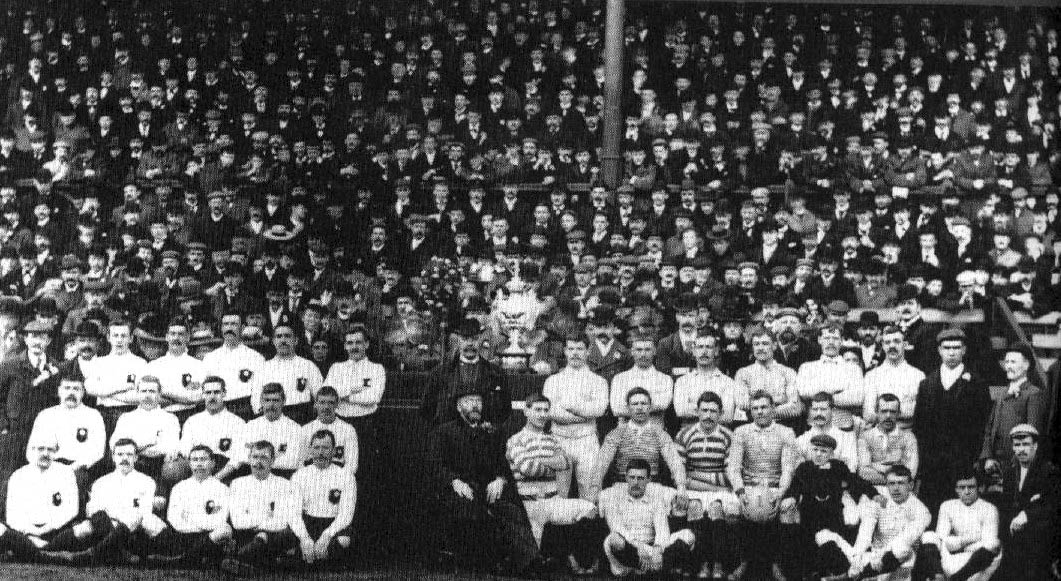
Batley and St Helens at the first Challenge Cup Final

In 1904, the first ever international game was played in Wigan in front of 6,000 fans which saw England lose to Other Nationalities 9–3. In 1906, rugby league became a 13-a-side sport.

In 1907, the 1907–08 New Zealand rugby tour of Australia and Great Britain became the first tour of Great Britain by a foreign national side. This tour marked the first game of rugby league in the capital which saw Great Britain lose to New Zealand 18–6 at Stamford Bridge in front of 14,000 fans.

1921 saw the first £1,000 transfer of Harold Buck from Hunslet to Leeds.

The 1929 Challenge Cup Final was the first to be played at Wembley which saw Wigan beat Dewsbury 13–2 to lift their second Challenge Cup. Rugby League's first flood-lit game in 1932 was a friendly between Leeds and Wigan at White City Stadium in front of 10,000 people - Leeds won 18–9. In 1948, the first ever televised rugby league game was played. It was the 1948 Challenge Cup Final, which saw Wigan lift their third cup beating Bradford 8–3. The Rugby League International Federation was also formed this year in Bordeaux.

The 1949–50 Northern Rugby Football League season set the record for the highest total match day attendance in a season of 69.8 million - a record that still holds today. In 1954, at the 1954 Challenge Cup Final Replay, the record for the highest attended rugby league fixture was set at the Odsal Stadium with an official crowd of 102,569 watching Warrington claim an 8–4 victory over Halifax.

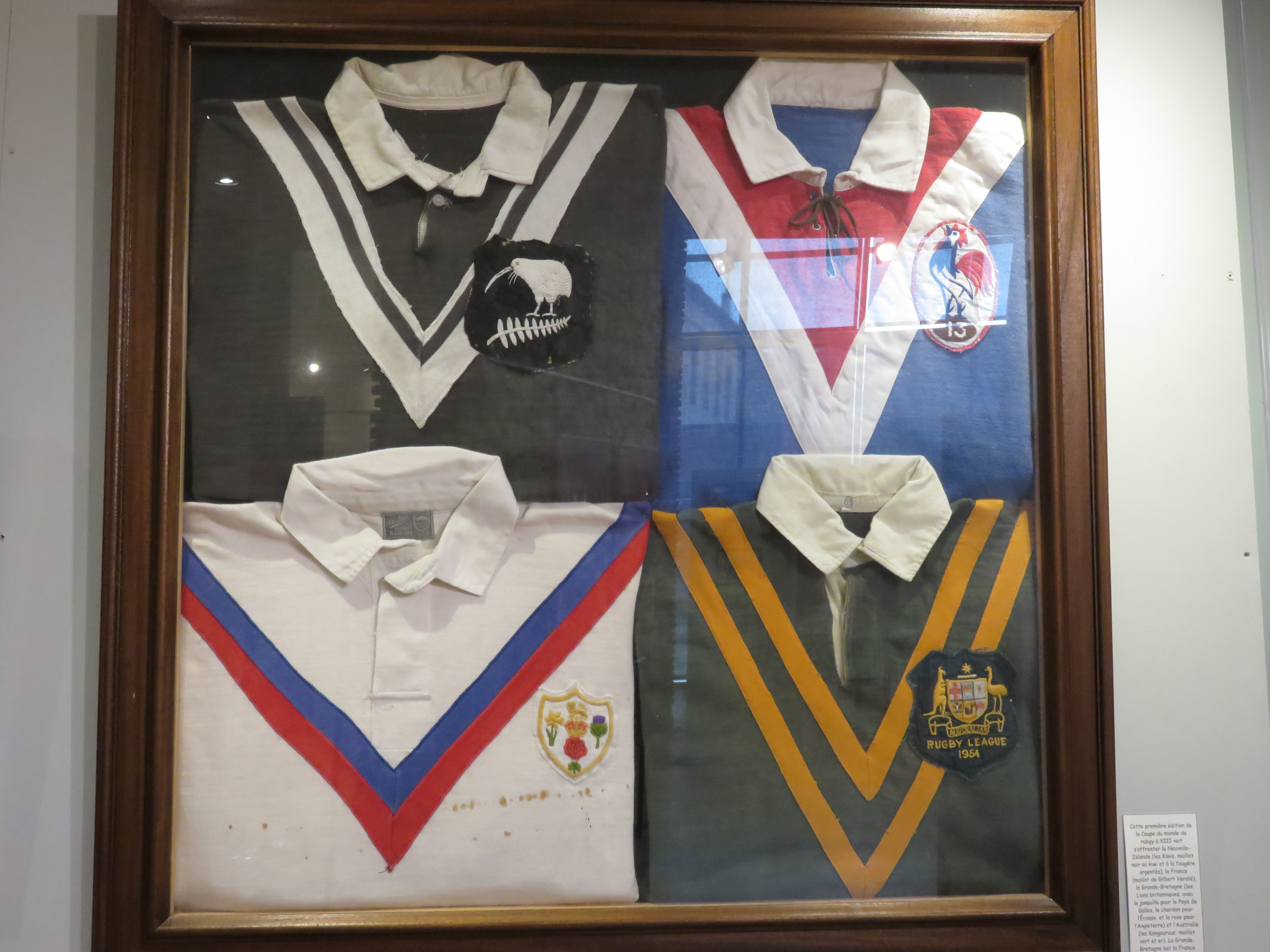
Great Britain was one of the founding members of the Rugby League World Cup, along with France, Australia, and New Zealand.

In 1954, the Rugby League World Cup was formed, 33 years ahead of the Rugby Union World Cup. The inaugural tournament was hosted in France and saw Great Britain beat the hosts in the final 16–12.

The 1960 Rugby League World Cup saw Great Britain as hosts for the first time. Great Britain won their second world cup title after losing out to Australia in the previous edition of the tournament.

In 1965, David Attenborough created the BBC2 Floodlit Trophy in order to promote the televising of rugby league. Four years later substitutes were permitted in matches, with the six-tackle rule being introduced in 1971. In 1972, Great Britain won their third, and most recent, world cup.

In 1976, the World Club Challenge was created which saw the league champions face Australia's league champions in what would become a yearly event. The inaugural competition saw Eastern Suburbs beat St Helens 25–2.

In 1981, Fulham R.L.F.C. formed from Fulham F.C. as part of its sporting family. They are currently the most successful team outside the heartlands. In 1983, yellow cards were introduced to the sport. Players receiving this card are subject to a 10-minute in game suspension. In 1991, the academy league was created in Great Britain.

The 1995 Rugby League World Cup marked the first time where Great Britain did not compete, instead competing as individual home nations of England, Scotland, Wales, and Ireland.

1996 saw the beginning of the Super League era where rugby league moved from a winter to summer sport. In 1998, the Super League Grand Final was created, reverting to a play-off system to decide the league champions. This marked the end of the longest period of time where the league leaders were crowned champions which had been in place since 1973. In 2003, the League Leaders' Shield was first awarded as a physical trophy, with the league leaders from 1998 to 2002 also being recognised for their achievement.

In 2002, London Skolars became the first community team in over 80 years to progress to the professional structure, with 2006 seeing French side Catalans Dragons join the league.

In 2007, Magic Weekend was introduced to the Super League, with the inaugural edition held at the Millennium Stadium in Cardiff. The event aiming to promote rugby league outside the heartlands. Following the 2007 season was the 2007 All Golds Tour which saw Great Britain compete for the final time - they won all three of their tour matches.

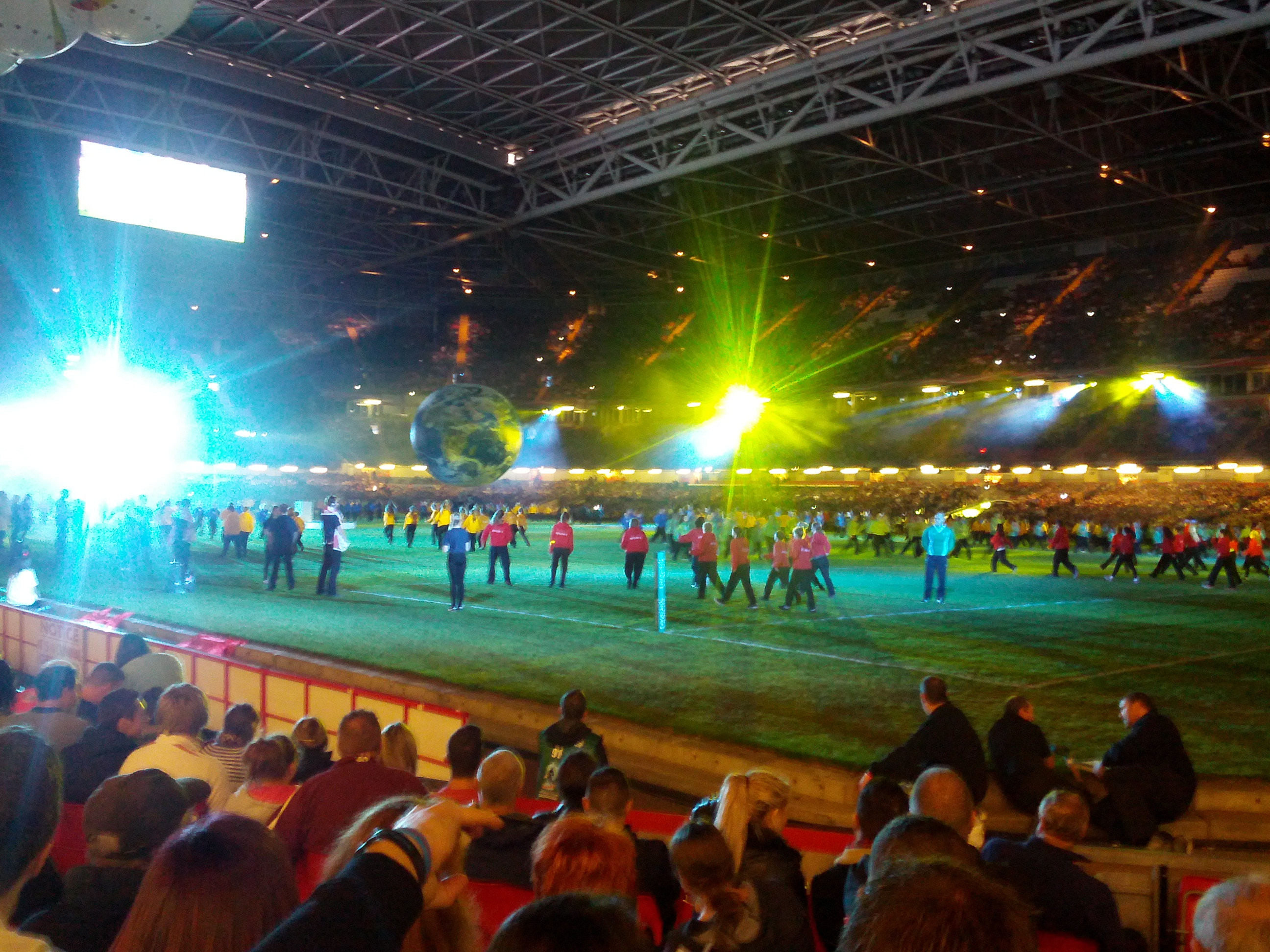
The opening ceremony of the 2013 Rugby League World Cup at Wales's Millennium Stadium

The 2013 Rugby League World Cup final at Old Trafford set the record for the largest attendance of an international rugby league game, with 74,468 people watching Australia beat New Zealand in the final.

2016 saw promotion and relegation return to British rugby league as the controversial Super League licensing was scrapped. 2017 saw the first trans-atlantic side in Toronto Wolfpack enter the British rugby league system in League 1.

The 2017 Rugby League World Cup was the closest a British side had come to winning the competition since 1972, with England losing 6–0 to Australia in the final.

2019 saw the return of Great Britain in the 2019 Great Britain Lions tour. The aim of the tour was to initiate a return for Great Britain to play competitively again, unfortunately they lost all four of their tour matches which caused people to question the feasibility of the team going forward.

August 2020 marked the 125th anniversary of the birth of rugby league, which saw the opening of the National Rugby League Museum at its birthplace at the George Hotel, Huddersfield.

In 2024, Australian Jarred Bassett became the first and only player in the British game to have played subsequently in tier 4, 3, 2, and 1 of the British rugby league system in four successive seasons.

== National team ==
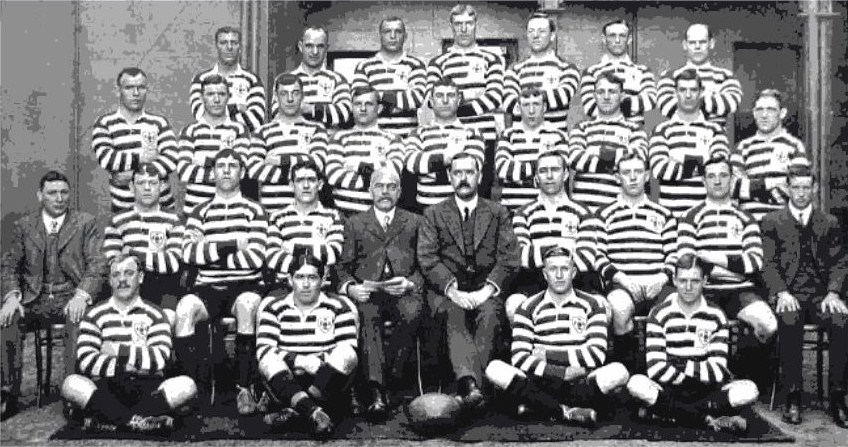
Great Britain national rugby league team during the 1910 Great Britain Lions tour of Australia and New Zealand

Unlike in most team sports in the United Kingdom, the UK has historically operated a unified national side, nicknamed the GB Lions, since 1908. The team saw great success, winning the 1954, 1960, and 1972 Rugby League World Cups in addition to achieving a runners up place on four separate occasions. However, the team did not enter the 1995 tournament in favour of England, Scotland, Wales, and Ireland competing separately. Despite this, the GB Lions still competed in other tournaments together such as test series and the Rugby League Tri-Nations, until 2007 where the team was disbanded altogether.

In 2019, the GB Lions were reunited for a tour of the Pacific, playing against New Zealand (twice), Tonga, and Papua New Guinea. The presence of the tour gave hope for the home nations to compete under a unified team again. However the fact that Great Britain lost all four tour matches called people to question the feasibility of the team, with a major criticism being the imbalance in the number of English players to the other nationalities. This was defended with the justification of a lack of high level domestic league in Scotland, Wales, and Ireland.

=== Women's team ===
Women's rugby league has also operated a full UK team nicknamed the GB Lionesses. Unlike the men's team, the women's team played in all competitions under the collective banner until the 2007 split in favour of the home nations competing individually. Before the split they competed in the inaugural 2000 Women's Rugby League World Cup, to which they were also hosts. The team came second, losing to New Zealand in the final. They also played the second world cup in 2003, which was their final major competition.

== Domestic competitions ==
=== League system ===
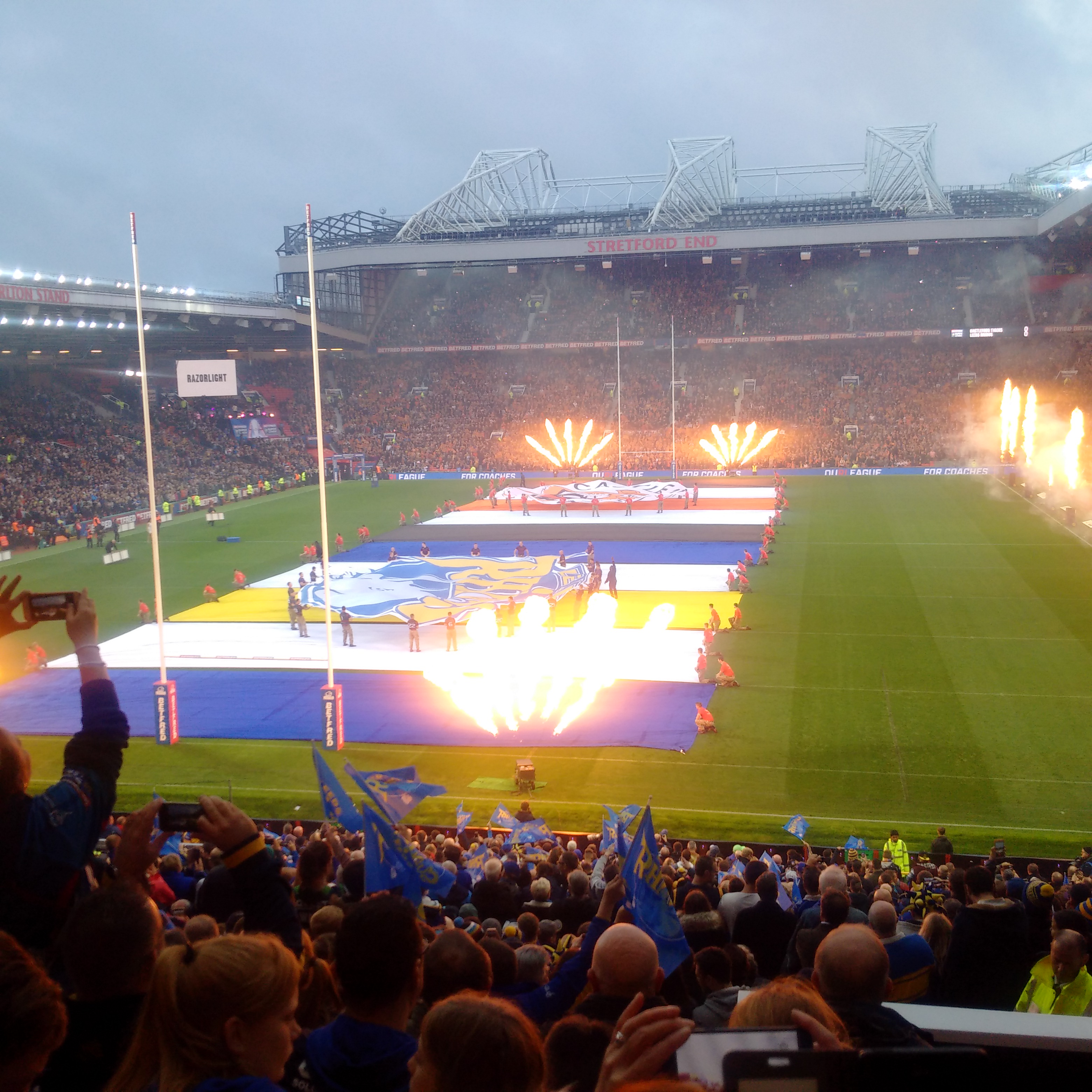
2017 Super League Grand Final between Castleford Tigers and Leeds Rhinos, hosted at Old Trafford

The league system in Great Britain has existed since 1895. Current the system operates a three-tier professional league system headed by the Super League, with the RFL Championship and RFL League 1 beneath the top tier. The professional structure is administered by the RFL, with BARLA administering the fourth tier National Conference League and Conference League South in addition to various fifth tier regional leagues. Three of these regional leagues, the North Wales Conference and the South Wales Premiership, and the Scottish National League are administered by Wales Rugby League and Scotland Rugby League respectively as teams that compete in them are exclusively part of the respective home nation. Despite this, they are also recognised as BARLA regional leagues in order to allow promotion to the conference leagues via the same method as the English regional leagues. The British rugby league system however doesn't include Northern Ireland who compete with Ireland on an all-Ireland basis. The Irish top tier of Rugby League is the Ireland National League.

=== Popularity and team geography ===
Due to the increased popularity of rugby league in Yorkshire, Lancashire, and Cumbria compared to the rest of the country, the majority of the 36 professional teams to make up the top three tiers are from this area of the country. Of the 34 professional British teams, only six are not from the two historical counties (five English, and one Welsh). All of the professional clubs in the Super League are based in the North of England except from Catalans Dragons who are based in France. In the second tier Championship, London Broncos and Toulouse Olympique are the only clubs outside of Northern England. Newcastle Thunder despite being from the North of England, are not based in the rugby league heartlands. Finally, in the third tier League 1, Midlands Hurricanes, London Skolars, and North Wales Crusaders are not from Northern England.

The increased popularity of Rugby League in its heartland of Yorkshire and Lancashire sees the National Conference League primarily operate in the heartlands and the Conference League South operate elsewhere. The National Conference League is split into four tiers to reflect its increased competitivity as teams in this league are primarily looking for promotion to the professional structure whereas teams in the Conference League South are usually looking for a greater standard of Rugby League than what exists in the regional league.

Due to the popularity of Rugby League in the heartlands of Yorkshire and Lancashire, the term "rugby" usually refers to rugby league in those regions whereas "rugby" usually refers to rugby union in the rest of the British Isles. Occasionally, in the heartlands, "football" also refers to rugby league however this is rare due to football being the most popular sport in the country.

In terms of the general public, a 2005 report by MORI Sports Tracker reported that 15% of British over 15s had in interest in rugby league and 12% regularly viewed matches. These figures we're down from 20% and 15% respectively in their 1996 report.

Locations of professional rugby league clubs in the United Kingdom, 2025

Average silver anniversary attendances

The following is a list of average home attendance for Super League clubs during the league's first 25 years. The list does not take into account games played behind closed doors do the COVID-19 pandemic. Non-British clubs are denoted in italics:

Club	Seasons	Average attendance
Leeds Rhinos	25	14,285
Wigan Warriors	25	12,844
Bradford Bulls	19	11,864
Hull F.C.	13	10,596
St Helens	25	10,311
Warrington Wolves	25	8,967
Catalans Dragons	15	8,346
Hull KR	13	7,937
Castleford Tigers	23	7,050
PSG	2	6,768
Widnes Vikings	11	5,922
Huddersfield Giants	22	5,921
Leigh Centurions	2	5,497
Wakefield Trinity	22	5,333
Halifax Panthers	8	4,724
Salford Red Devils	22	4,265
Sheffield Eagles	4	4,259
Celtic Crusaders	3	3,903
Gateshead Thunder	1	3,888
Oldham Roughyeds	2	3,753
London Broncos	20	3,435
Workington Town	1	2,305
Toronto Wolfpack	1	—N/a (Note: No home games played)

=== Cup competitions ===
The Challenge Cup is the national cup of Rugby League in the United Kingdom. The competition is administered by the RFL and was instituted in 1896. The competition has also seen teams from Ireland, France, Canada, Russia and Serbia compete.

The 1895 Cup also exists for teams competing in the Championship and League 1.

=== Women's rugby ===
In 2012 the Women's Challenge Cup played its inaugural edition becoming the first major women's rugby league competition and is administered by the RFL. The RFL also administer the Women's Super League, the top tier of women's rugby league introduced in 2017 replacing the RFL Women's Rugby League which started in 2014. In 2021, in an attempt to expand women's rugby league, the Women's Super League South as a new top-tier competition. While the Super League South is officially a top-tier competition, participants are not eligible for the Grand Final.

=== Defunct competitions ===
There have been a number of rugby league competitions played in the British Isles during its history. The current Super League is the direct successor to the Rugby Football League Championship First Division during its rebrand in 1996, with the Second Division, and Third Division being rebranded to the Championship and League 1 respectively in 2003.

The 1895 Cup (2019–present) has also existed under different names at different points in history. Once as the Trans-Pennine Cup (1998–2001), as the Championship Cup (2002–2013), and again as the League 1 Cup (2015–2017).

The League Cup (1972–1996) and Charity Shield (1985–1996) have also existed for short periods of time and operated in the same way as the English football competitions of the same name. The League Cup being a cup for professional clubs only, and the Charity Shield a single game competition to mark the start of the season between the previous years league champions and challenge cup winners.

The county competitions in Lancashire and Yorkshire were historically a major part of rugby league in the British Isles. The RFL Lancashire League and RFL Yorkshire League are as old as the national league itself and the RFL Lancashire Cup and RFL Yorkshire Cup were founded only a decade after the Challenge Cup. The county league were abandoned in 1970 and the cups in 1996 in order to develop rugby league nationally. The Rugby League War of the Roses was the only county competition to survive into the Super League era, being abandoned in 2003. The competition was a single game event featuring one team from each county and was based on the roses rivalry that has existed between the two counties since the Wars of the Roses which ended in 1487. For most of its history the Roses Match was played as part of the County Championship.

== Governing bodies ==
=== Men's governance ===
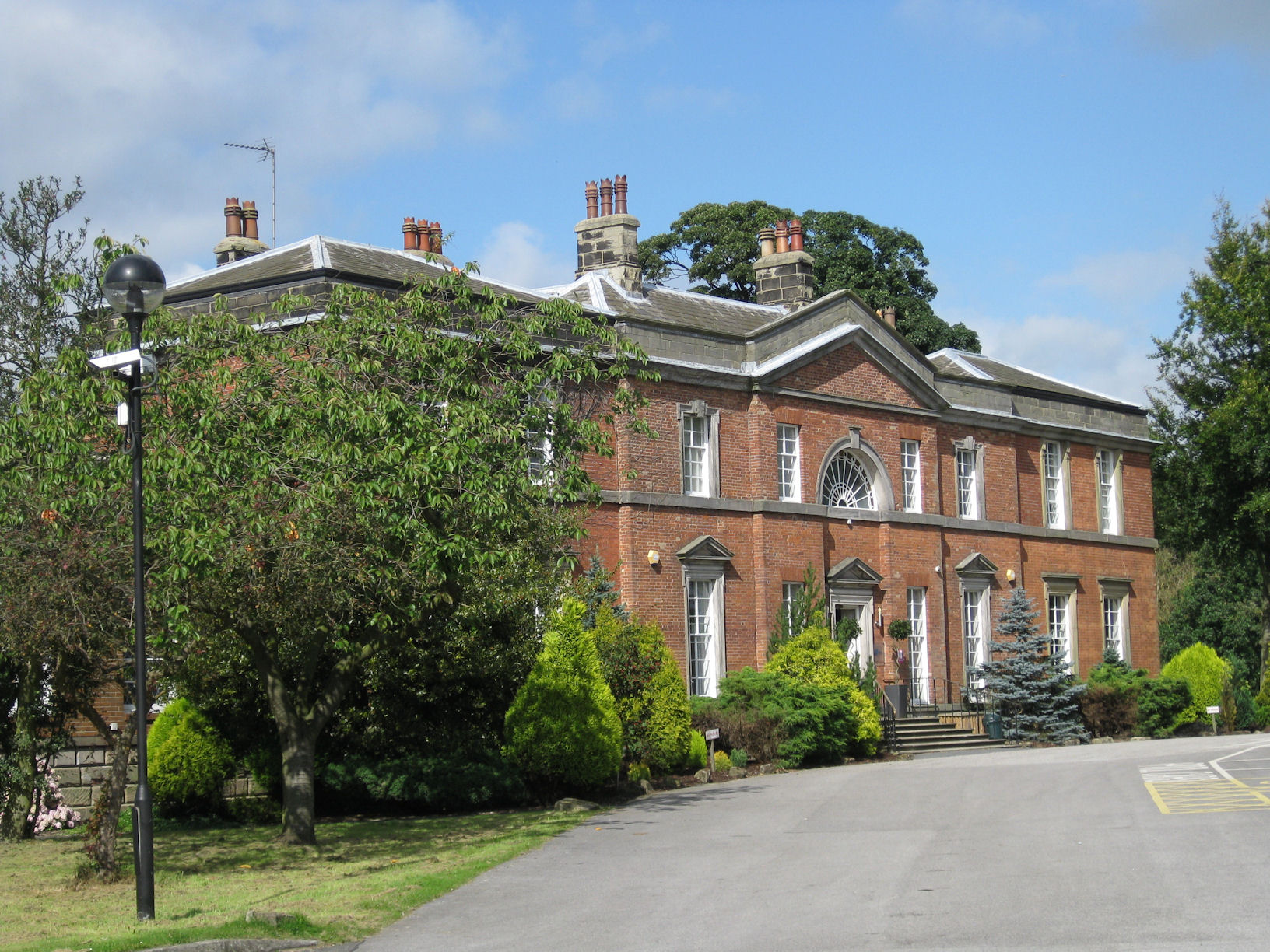
The RFL headquarters in Leeds

The Rugby Football League (RFL) was the governing body for rugby league in the British Isles until the founding of Rugby League Ireland, Scotland Rugby League, Wales Rugby League, and in 1988, 1994, and 1995 respectively. Currently, the RFL has full control over Rugby League in England only with the other organisations operating within their respective home nation. However, the RFL has powers over the North Wales Crusaders as the RFL are the sole governors of the professional league system.

All four bodies are affiliated with the International Rugby League (IRL) and the European Rugby League (ERL), and government their own national teams with the RFL, Wales Rugby League, and Scotland Rugby League jointly operating the Great Britain national rugby league team.

The British Amateur Rugby League Association (BARLA) are responsible for amateur rugby league chiefly in the sport's North of England heartlands. Though many National Conference League and Conference League South teams are affiliated to BARLA, the Conference itself is not a BARLA organisation. As well as the conferences, BARLA overseas a number of regional leagues, mostly located in the heartlands, but also including the North Wales Conference and the South Wales Premiership, and the Scottish National League which are administered by Wales Rugby League and Scotland Rugby League respectively but also see BARLA involvement in order to allow promotion to the conferences.

BARLA are also responsible for selecting an international team consisting of amateur players, the BARLA Lions. This team tours many parts of the rugby league world, and have competed in the Rugby League Emerging Nations Tournament.

=== Women's rugby ===
The Women's Amateur Rugby League Association (WARLA) was the governing body of female rugby league in the British Isles from its established in 1985. It was recognised by the RFL in its first year. In 2013 WARLA became fully incorporated into the Rugby Football League which now runs the top tiers of the women's game.

=== Armed forces ===
Rugby league was recognised as a military sport in 1994. The Combined Services Rugby League (CSRL) is the co-ordinating group for the British Army Rugby League, Royal Navy Rugby League and Royal Air Force Rugby League. Each constituent body organises its own competitions at unit and formation level. Players are fed into representative teams to represent each of the services, and the best players are selected to represent the Combined Services. Because of the difference in sovereignty between the United Kingdom and Republic of Ireland, it is the only place where Northern Ireland competes in rugby league under a UK system rather than an all-Ireland one. Great Britain Police also have their own rugby league team which, along with those if the armed forces, regularly competes in the Challenge Cup.

=== Student rugby ===
The British Universities and Colleges Sport run The University and College Rugby League and govern rugby league at the university level. The Champion Schools is the top-level competition for secondary school children in Great Britain.

== Rivalries ==
=== Club ===
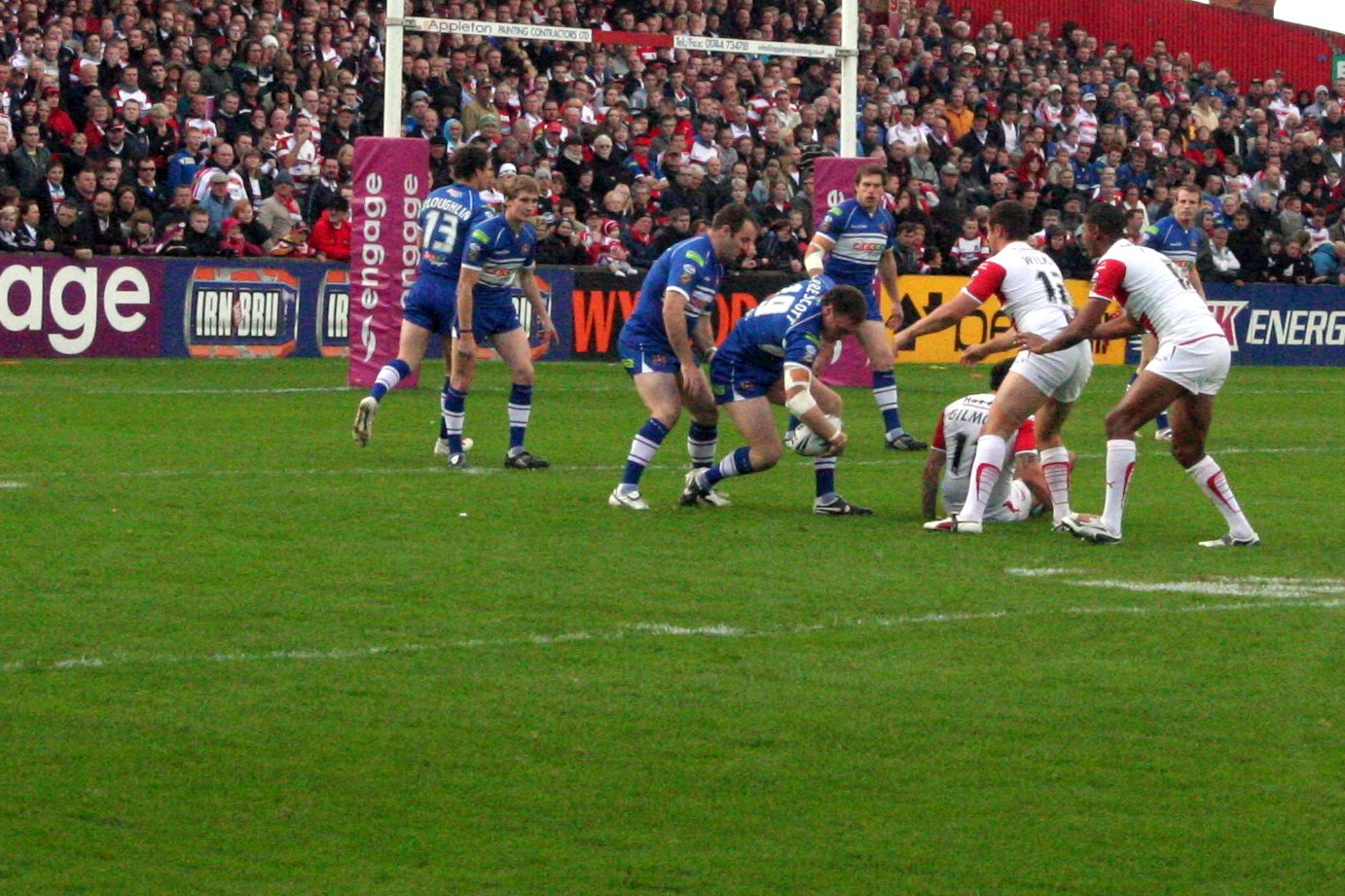
St Helens vs Wigan Warriors during the Super League XIV Semi-finals

There are a number of rivalries within professional rugby in the British Isles, with debate about which one is the biggest. The Hull derby between Hull F.C. and Hull KR is the only derby where both participants are from the same city. The Good Friday derby is also considered a major rivalry with the two teams, Wigan Warriors and St Helens, consistently performing well in the league and cup competitions. Other major rivalries include the Calder derby, Cheshire derby, and West Yorkshire derby.

Additionally, there is a four-way rivalry between the so-called Super League Big Four. These four team are usually contain the champion of every season, both in the Super League and Challenge Cup. The Big Four consists of Wigan Warriors, St Helens, Leeds Rhinos, and Warrington Wolves. Prior to 2010, Bradford Bulls was considered a Big Four member, before the rise of Warrington, the club has since dropped in performance level and now plays in the Championship.

=== County ===
Lancashire and Yorkshire have always shared a rivalry due to the War of the Roses. This rivalry has naturally seeped into rugby league to which they completed in a competition of the same name until 2003. The rivalry is also seen when clubs from both counties face each other in competitive and non-competitive matches.

=== International ===
England (previously Great Britain as a whole) is main rival is with Australia, with whom they compete in The Ashes. This rivalry has also affected the domestic game with the Super League and National Rugby League becoming the two biggest club competitions on the planet with the two competition winners competing in the World Club Challenge. England (and Great Britain) also share a rivalry with New Zealand to whom they also have contested many tours.

England and Wales also share a three way rivalry with France through the Rugby League European Championship – the traditional big three European teams.

== Tournaments hosted ==
Competition	Year	Home nations who hosted
Rugby League World Cup	1960(M)	England
Rugby League World Cup	1970(M)	England
Rugby League World Cup	1975(M)	England; Wales
Rugby League World Cup	1995(M)	England; Wales
Rugby League World Cup	2000(M); 2000(W)	England; Wales; Scotland; Ireland
Rugby League Tri-Nations	2004	England
Rugby League Tri-Nations	2005	England
Rugby League Four Nations	2009	England
Rugby League Four Nations	2011	England; Wales
Rugby League World Cup	2013(M); 2013(W)	England; Wales; Ireland
Rugby League Four Nations	2016	England
Rugby League World Cup	2021(M); 2021(W)	England

== Television rights ==
Live Super League and National Rugby League games are shown on Sky Sports Arena with highlights also being shown on the channel. On Monday evenings, during the UK domestic season, the Super League Show is broadcast in the BBC regions of North East and Cumbria, North West, Yorkshire, and Yorkshire and Lincolnshire which shows highlights of the weekend's matches. There is a nation repeat on Tuesday lunchtime. From the 2022 season, 10 live Super League games per season will be shown on Channel 4, the first time the league will be shown on terrestrial television. Championship games are shown on Premier Sports, with one game a week being aird.

Challenge Cup matches are shown on BBC Sport. The final and semi-finals are shown usually on BBC One. Matches prior to the sixth round are usually shown on BBC Red Button or as BBC iPlayer exclusives. BBC Two is also used in addition to BBC One to show the matches from the latter stages of competition.

Historical summary

The BBC started airing the Challenge Cup Final regularly from 1958 and lower rounds from 1960. The final was also broadcast as a one-off in 1948 and 1952. Sky Sports began covering league matches from the 1990–91 season. For a dealied summary of summer era coverage from 1996 onwards, see the below table:

Deal duration	Super League	Championship	League 1	Challenge Cup
1996–1999	Sky Sports	No competition	No competition	Sky Sports
1999–2003	Sky Sports	No competition	No competition	BBC
2004–2008	Sky Sports	None	None	BBC
2009–2011	Sky Sports	Sky Sports and Premier Sports	None	BBC
2012–2016	Sky Sports	Sky Sports	None	BBC and Sky Sports
2017–2021	Sky Sports	Sky Sports (Playoffs only)	None	BBC
2022–2023	Sky Sports and Channel 4	Premier Sports	None	BBC and Premier Sports
2024–2026	Sky Sports and BBC	None	None	BBC and Super League+

== Stadiums ==
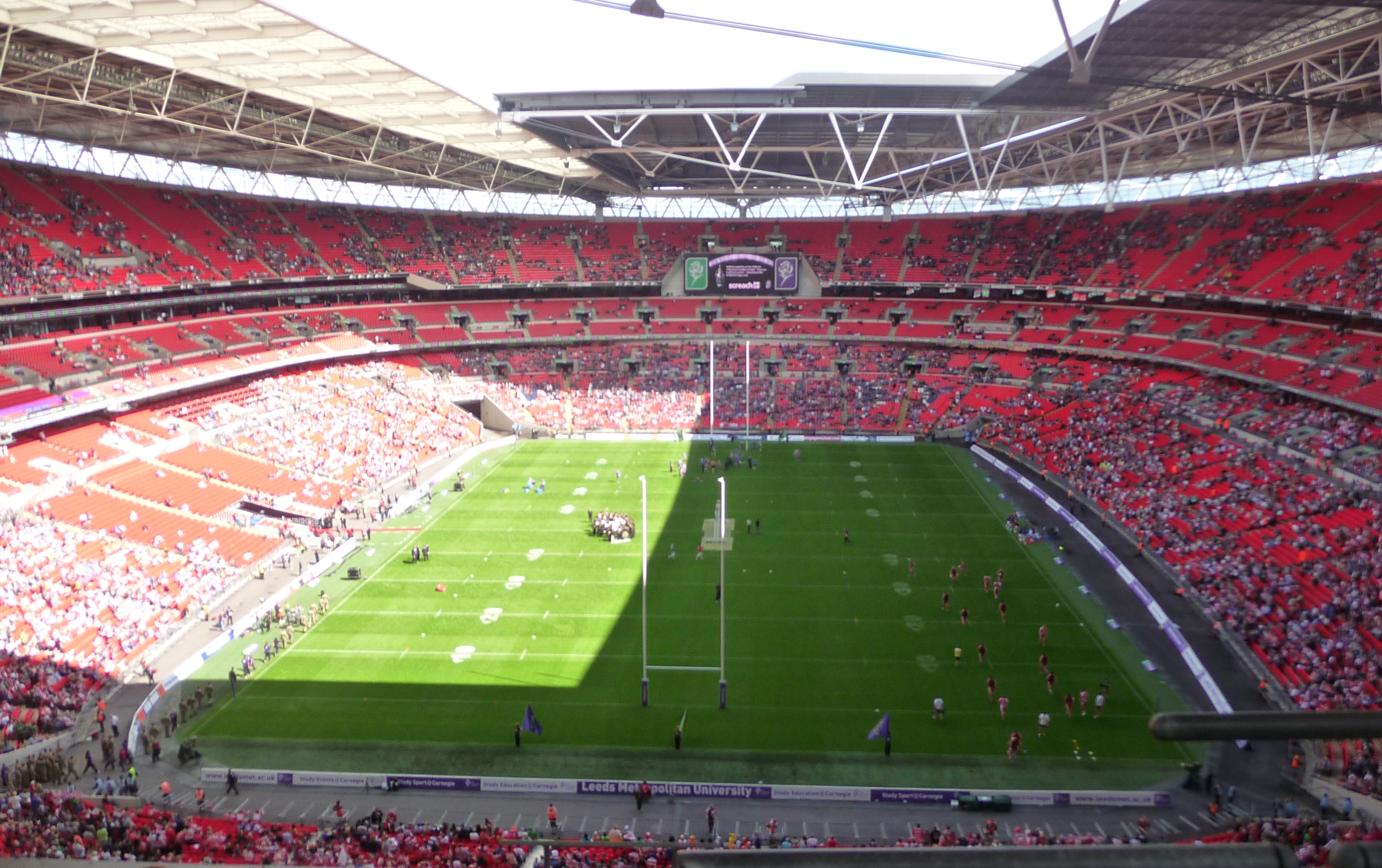
The British Isles's largest stadium, Wembley Stadium, is the venue for the Challenge Cup Final.

Ireland is the only home nation to have a national rugby league stadium, two in fact, with Irish home matches being played at Carlisle Grounds and Morton Stadium. England, Scotland, and Wales also don't have set home grounds. Elland Road has been the most recent home venue for England, Netherdale for Scotland, and the Racecourse Ground for Wales.

Domestically, Old Trafford is used as the venue of the Super League Grand Final, with Wembley Stadium hosting the Challenge Cup Final. Super League's Magic Weekend has previously been hosted at the Millennium Stadium, Murrayfield, Etihad Stadium, St James' Park, and Anfield.

The MKM Stadium, home of Hull F.C., is the largest club venue in the British Isles. The stadium was also used to host the 2020 Super League Grand Final as Old Trafford couldn't accommodate that year due to the COVID-19 pandemic. Following this, the DW Stadium, Kirklees Stadium, Odsal Stadium, and Headingley are the only other club venues to have a capacity greater than 20,000.

== Museums ==
The UK's National Rugby League Museum opened in August 2020 in the George Hotel, Huddersfield, Yorkshire, the birthplace of rugby league, on the sport's 125th anniversary.

== Other versions played ==
- 7s and 9s: Rugby league played with 7 and 9 players per side respectively, more common among pub teams due to the greater ease of getting a full squad.
- Touch rugby: A limited contact version of the sport where a tackle is made by placing two hands on the opponent.
- Wheelchair rugby league: Played by people in wheelchairs.
- Masters Rugby League: Rugby league with modified rules to make it more suitable for older players.

== See also ==
- Women's rugby league in the British Isles
- British Rugby League Hall of Fame
- British rugby league system
- Rugby union in the British Isles
