= Rugby league in Lancashire =

Rugby League in Lancashire refers to the sport of rugby league in relation to its participation and history within the traditional county of Lancashire, England. The county has since been split up for administrative purposes with parts of traditional Lancashire forming parts of Greater Manchester, Merseyside, Cheshire and Cumbria as well as the current borders of Lancashire.

== History ==
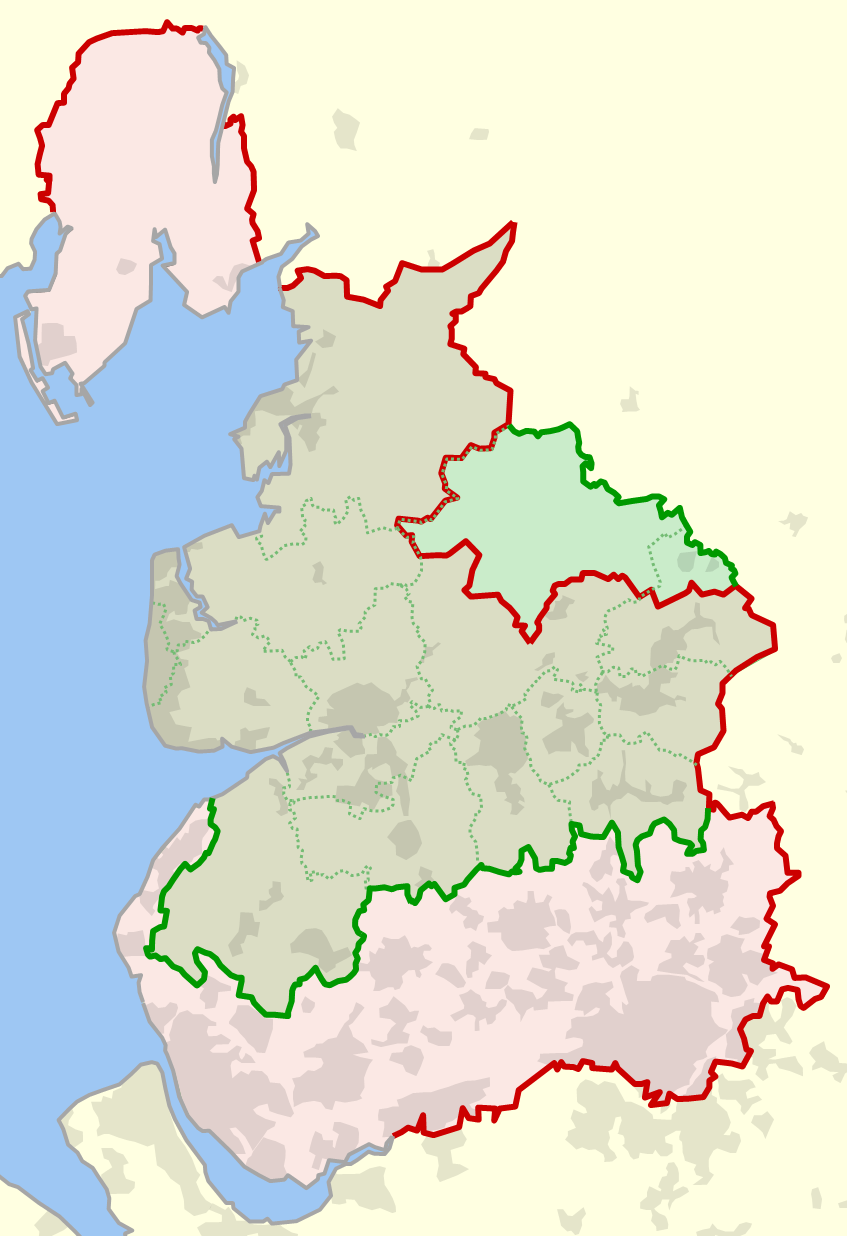
In the context of this article, Lancashire is defined by its historical boundaries (shown in red) and not its modern boundaries (shown in green).

Rugby league was founded in Yorkshire in 1895 at the George Hotel in Huddersfield when 22 clubs broke away from the Rugby Football Union to form the Northern Rugby Football Union which later changed its name to the Rugby Football League. Of those 22 founding clubs, 9 were from Lancashire.

The first Lancashire winners of the newly formed league, the NRFU Championship were Oldham, with Wigan being the most successful with 22 titles. Between 1896 and 1900 teams either played in the Lancashire or Yorkshire League depending on geographical location but still competed in the Challenge Cup. Wigan are the most successful club in the competition with 19 titles.

In the Super League era St Helens R.F.C. are the most successful Lancashire club, and second most of all (behind Leeds Rhinos), with seven Super League titles.

== Competitions ==
=== Lancashire League ===
The Lancashire League was founded in 1895 for teams in Lancashire to compete in. Wigan and St Helens dominated the league before it was abandoned in 1970 due to the amount of fixtures being played.

=== Lancashire Cup ===
The Lancashire Cup was a cup competition for teams in Lancashire. The competition ran from 1905-1992 when it folded due to the amount of fixtures in the calendar and the Rugby Football League (RFL) not seeing it as being a part of the future of modern rugby league.

== Rugby league clubs in Lancashire ==
The table below lists clubs located within the traditional borders of Lancashire: from the top division (the Super League), down to tier 3 of the British rugby league system.

Club	Stadium	Founded	County Subdivision	Honours
Super League - tier 1
Leigh Leopards	Leigh Sports Village	1878	Greater Manchester	League: 1905-06, 1981-82 (2); Challenge Cup: 1920-21, 1979-71 (2)
Salford Red Devils	AJ Bell Stadium	1873	Greater Manchester	League: 1913-14, 1932–33, 1936–37, 1938–39, 1973–74, 1975-76 (6); Challenge Cup: 1937-38 (1)
St. Helens	Totally Wicked Stadium	1873	Merseyside	League: 1931/32, 1952/53, 1958/59, 1965/66, 1969/70, 1970/71, 1974/75, 1996, 1999, 2000, 2002, 2006, 2014, 2019, 2020, 2021 (16); Challenge Cup: 1955-56, 1960–61, 1965–66, 1971–72, 1975–76, 1996, 1997, 2001, 2004, 2006, 2007, 2008, 2021 (13)
Warrington Wolves	Halliwell Jones	1876	Cheshire	League: 1947–48, 1953–54, 1954–55 (3); Challenge Cup: 1904–05, 1906–07, 1949–50, 1953–54, 1973–74, 2009, 2010, 2012 (8)
Wigan Warriors	DW Stadium	1872	Greater Manchester	League: 1908/09, 1921/22, 1925/26, 1933/34, 1945/46, 1946/47, 1949/50, 1951/52, 1959/60, 1986/87, 1989/90, 1990/91, 1991/92, 1992/93, 1993/94, 1994/95, 1995/96, 1998, 2010, 2013 (20); Challenge Cup: 1923–24, 1928–29, 1947–48, 1950–51, 1957–58, 1958–59, 1964–65, 1985, 1987–88, 1988–89, 1989–90, 1990–91, 1991–92, 1992–93, 1993–94, 1994–95, 2002, 2011, 2013. (19)
Championship - tier 2
Widnes Vikings	Halton Stadium	1875	Cheshire	League: 1977–78, 1987–88, 1988–89 (3); Challenge Cup: 1929–30, 1936–37, 1963–64, 1974–75, 1978–79, 1980–81, 1983–84 (7)
League 1 - tier 3
Barrow Raiders	Craven Park	1875	Cumbria	Challenge Cup: 1954-5 (1)
Oldham	Whitebank Stadium	1876	Greater Manchester	League: 1904-05, 1909–10, 1910–11, 1956-57 (4); Challenge Cup: 1898-99, 1924–25, 1926-27 (3)
Swinton Lions	Park Lane	1866	Greater Manchester	League: 1926-27, 1927–28, 1930–31, 1934–35, 1962–63, 1963–64 (6); Challenge Cup: 1899–1900, 1925–26, 1927–28 (3)
Rochdale Hornets	Spotland	1866	Greater Manchester	Challenge Cup: 1922 (1)

== Locations ==
=== Greater Manchester ===
Locations of all the professional and semi-professional rugby league clubs in the former Lancashire region of Greater Manchester.

Greater Manchester has the strongest concentration of rugby league teams within the traditional boundaries of Lancashire. The most notable team is Wigan Warriors.

=== Cheshire ===
Locations of all the professional and semi-professional rugby league clubs in the former Lancashire region of Cheshire.

Cheshire had its own rugby league tradition with Runcorn being one of the founder members of the Northern Union in 1895 but this died out. Boundary changes to England's counties in the 1970s brought the formerly Lancastrian towns of Widnes and Warrington into Cheshire.

=== Merseyside ===
Locations of all the professional and semi-professional rugby league clubs in the former Lancashire region of Merseyside.

Merseyside was a county formed in 1974 from parts of Lancashire and Cheshire. Currently St. Helens are the only professional side within Merseyside, but other sides have also existed, notably Liverpool Stanley and Prescot Panthers.

=== Cumbria ===
Locations of all the professional and semi-professional rugby league clubs in the former Lancashire region of Cumbria.

Cumbria is a county that was created in the 1970s composing of the former counties of Cumberland, Westmorland and parts of Lancashire and Yorkshire. Barrow Raiders are the oldest side in what is now Cumbria and are based in what was part of Lancashire. Other Cumbrian sides exist and have existed in the traditional county of Cumberland, namely Whitehaven, Workington Town and at one time Carlisle. These sides played in the Lancashire cup despite playing outside the boundaries of traditional Lancashire.

=== Lancashire ===
Within the current borders of Lancashire there are currently no professional rugby league sides. The most recent side to play is Blackpool Panthers which folded in 2010.

== See also ==
- Rugby league in the British Isles
- Rugby league in England
- Rugby league in Yorkshire
