= Rugby league in Yorkshire =

Rugby League in Yorkshire refers to the sport of rugby league in relation to its participation and history within Yorkshire, England. The traditional county is the largest in the United Kingdom and as thus has many rugby clubs, professional and amateur.

== History ==
In the context of this article, Yorkshire is defined by its historical boundaries of three ridings, this is mostly the same as its modern-day boundaries which consists of four counties.

Rugby league was founded in Yorkshire in 1895 at the George Hotel in Huddersfield when 22 clubs broke away from the Rugby Football Union to form the Northern Rugby Football Union which later changed its name to the Rugby Football League.

The first winners of the newly formed league, the NRFU Championship were Bradford based team Manningham FC in 1895. Between 1896 and 1900 teams either played in the Yorkshire or Lancashire League depending on geographical location but still competed in the Challenge Cup. In the early years of the competition Huddersfield were a dominant force, winning multiple league titles between the 1910s and 1940s.

In the Super League era, Bradford Bulls were one of the dominant forces in the early years winning four titles between 1997 and 2005. Leeds Rhinos became the most successful team in Yorkshire winning eight Super League titles and winning 14 Challenge Cups.

== Competitions ==
=== Yorkshire League ===
The Yorkshire League was founded in 1895 for teams in Yorkshire to compete in. Leeds and Huddersfield dominated the league before it was abandoned in 1970 due to the amount of fixtures being played.

=== Yorkshire Cup ===
The Yorkshire Cup was a cup competition for teams in Yorkshire. The competition ran from 1905–1992 when it folded due to the number of fixtures in the calendar, and the Rugby Football League (RFL) not seeing it as being a part of the future of modern rugby league.

== Rugby league clubs in Yorkshire ==
The table below lists clubs located within the traditional borders of Yorkshire in the top two tiers of the British rugby league system: the Super League and the Championship.

Club	Stadium	Founded	County Subdivision	Honours
Super League - tier 1
Bradford Bulls	Odsal	1907	West Yorkshire	League: 1979–80, 1980–81, 1997, 2001, 2003, 2005 (6); Challenge Cup: 1943–44, 1946–47, 1948–49, 2000, 2003 (5)
Castleford Tigers	Wheldon Road	1925	West Yorkshire	Challenge Cup: 1934-35, 1968–69, 1969–70, 1985-86 (4)
Huddersfield Giants	John Smith's Stadium	1864	West Yorkshire	League: 1911-12, 1912–13, 1914–15, 1928–29, 1929–30, 1948–49, 1961-62 (7); Challenge Cup: 1912–13, 1914–15, 1919–20, 1932–33, 1944–45, 1952–53 (6)
Hull FC	KCOM Stadium	1865	East Riding of Yorkshire	League: 1919–20, 1920–21, 1935–36, 1955–56, 1957–58, 1982–83 (6); Challenge Cup: 1913–14, 1981–82, 2005, 2016, 2017 (5)
Hull Kingston Rovers	Craven Park	1882	East Riding of Yorkshire	League: 1922–23, 1924–25, 1978–79, 1983–84, 1984–85, 2025 (6); Challenge Cup: 1979-80, 2025 (2)
Leeds Rhinos	Headingley Stadium	1864	West Yorkshire	League: 1960–61, 1968–69, 1971–72, 2004, 2007, 2008, 2009, 2011, 2012, 2015, 2017 (11); Challenge Cup: 1909–10, 1922–23, 1931–32, 1935–36, 1940–41, 1941–42, 1956–57, 1967–68, 1976–77, 1977–78, 1999, 2014, 2015, 2020 (14)
Wakefield Trinity	Belle Vue	1873	West Yorkshire	League: 1966–67, 1967–68 (2); Challenge Cup: 1908–09, 1945–46, 1959–60, 1961–62, 1962–63 (5)
York Knights	York Community Stadium	2002	North Yorkshire	N/A
Championship - tier 2
Batley Bulldogs	Mount Pleasant	1880	West Yorkshire	League: 1923-24 (1); Challenge Cup: 1896-97, 1897–98, 1900-01 (3)
Dewsbury Rams	Crown Flatt	1898	West Yorkshire	League: 1972-73 (1); Challenge Cup: 1911-12, 1942-43 (2)
Doncaster	Keepmoat Stadium	1951	South Yorkshire	N/A
Goole Vikings	Victoria Pleasure Grounds	2018	East Riding of Yorkshire	N/A
Halifax	The Shay	1873	West Yorkshire	League: 1902-03, 1906-1907, 1964–65, 1985-86 (4); Challenge Cup: 1902-03, 1903–04, 1930–31, 1938–39, 1986-87 (5)
Hunslet	South Leeds Stadium	1973	West Yorkshire	League: 1907-08, 1937-38 (2); Challenge Cup: 1907-08, 1933-34 (2)
Keighley Cougars	Cougar Park	1876	West Yorkshire	N/A
Sheffield Eagles	Keepmoat Stadium	1984	South Yorkshire	Challenge Cup: 1996 (1)

== Locations ==
=== West Yorkshire ===
Locations of all the professional and semi-professional rugby league clubs in West Yorkshire.

West Yorkshire has the most clubs in the whole of Yorkshire with 10 teams based in the region. Traditionally, Leeds Rhinos and Huddersfield Giants have been the two most successful, Bradford Bulls also became a dominant force in rugby league during the Super League era along with Leeds.

=== East Riding of Yorkshire ===
Locations of all the professional and semi-professional rugby league clubs in the East Riding of Yorkshire.

Three teams are based in the East Riding of Yorkshire, two of these play in Kingston upon Hull. Traditionally Hull F.C. are said to represent the West side of the city and Hull Kingston Rovers represent the East side of the city with the boundary being the River Hull. The third side is Goole Vikings.

=== South Yorkshire ===
Locations of all the professional and semi-professional rugby league clubs in South Yorkshire

Two clubs compete and are based in South Yorkshire; Sheffield Eagles and Doncaster. Doncaster play at the Keepmoat Stadium in Doncaster whereas Sheffield play at the Sheffield Olympic Legacy Stadium in Sheffield. Sheffield Eagles are the most successful of the two teams having won the 1996 Challenge Cup. Doncaster have yet to win any major honours.

=== North Yorkshire ===
Locations of all the professional and semi-professional rugby league clubs in North Yorkshire

The only side in North Yorkshire is currently York Knights (previously York) but sides have existed in Ripon and Scarborough.

== See also ==
- Rugby league in the British Isles
- Rugby league in England
- Rugby league in Lancashire
