= Rugby League Heritage Centre =

Former rugby museum in Huddersfield, England

Coordinates: 53.6480°N 1.7833°W

The Rugby League Heritage Centre was formerly located in the basement of the George Hotel, Huddersfield, West Yorkshire, England. It was the first rugby league heritage museum and was significantly influenced by Sky Sports presenter and former Great Britain international Mike Stephenson.

== History ==
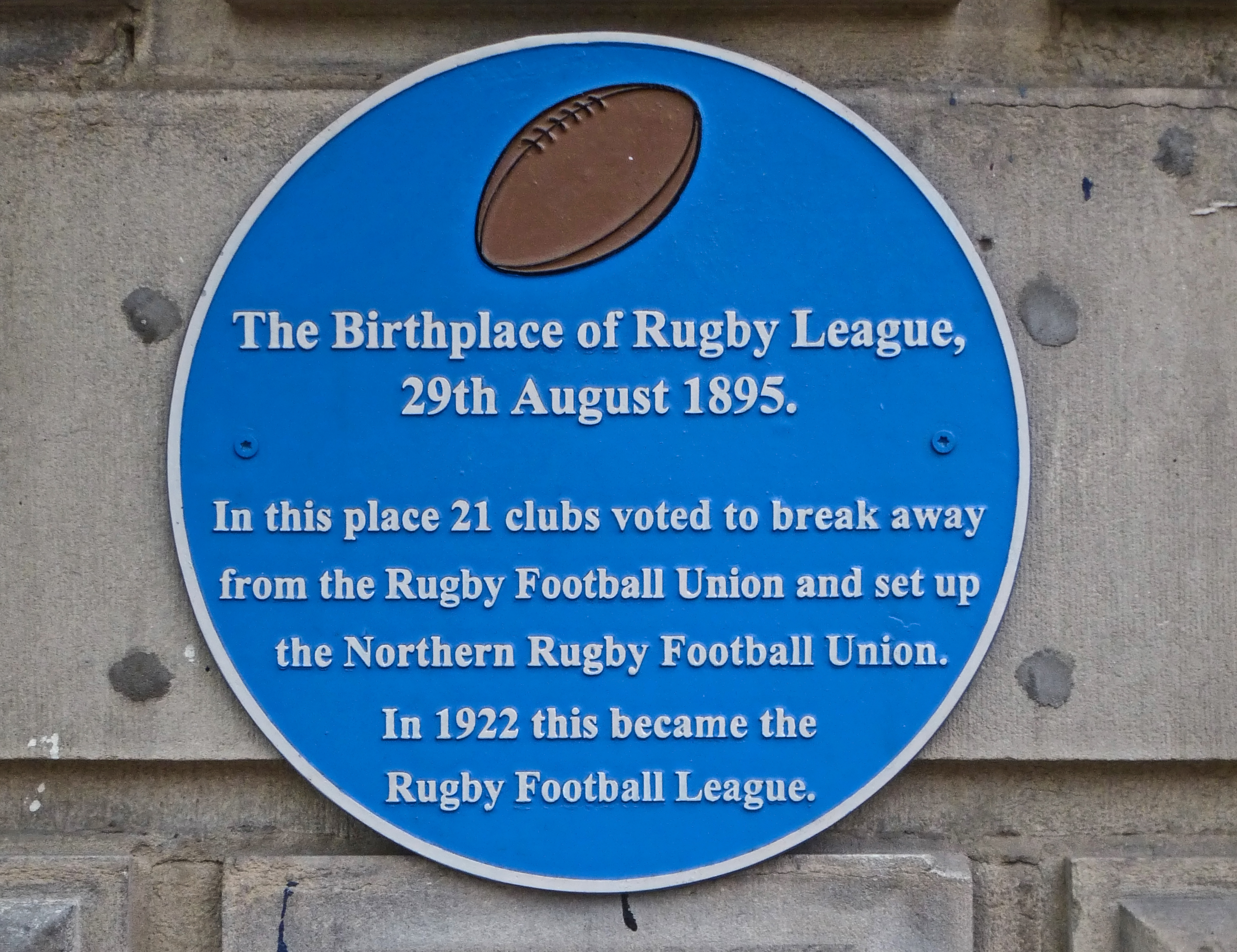
Commemorative plaque to the foundation of Rugby League on George Hotel, Huddersfield

Twenty-one northern clubs held a meeting and by a majority of 20 to 1 voted to secede from the Rugby Football Union to set up their own Northern Rugby Football Union at the George Hotel, Huddersfield on 29 August 1895. In 1922 this became the Rugby Football League.

The Rugby League Heritage Centre was opened at the George Hotel on 30 August 2005 by former players Billy Boston, Neil Fox and Mick Sullivan. The centre featured displays of memorabilia, including rare jerseys, medals, caps, programmes and photographs owned by Mike Stephenson.

In 2013, the hotel was sold. The sporting charity, Rugby League Cares, was given £97,200 from the Heritage Lottery Fund to secure the collection. The collection was put on tour and in storage until a new location could be arranged.

In 2016, plans were announced for a new National Rugby League Museum, based in nearby Bradford, to succeed the Heritage Centre, however these plans never reached fruition, Odsal Stadium redevelopment plans shelved.

== See also ==
- Webb Ellis Rugby Football Museum
