= Rugby league in England =

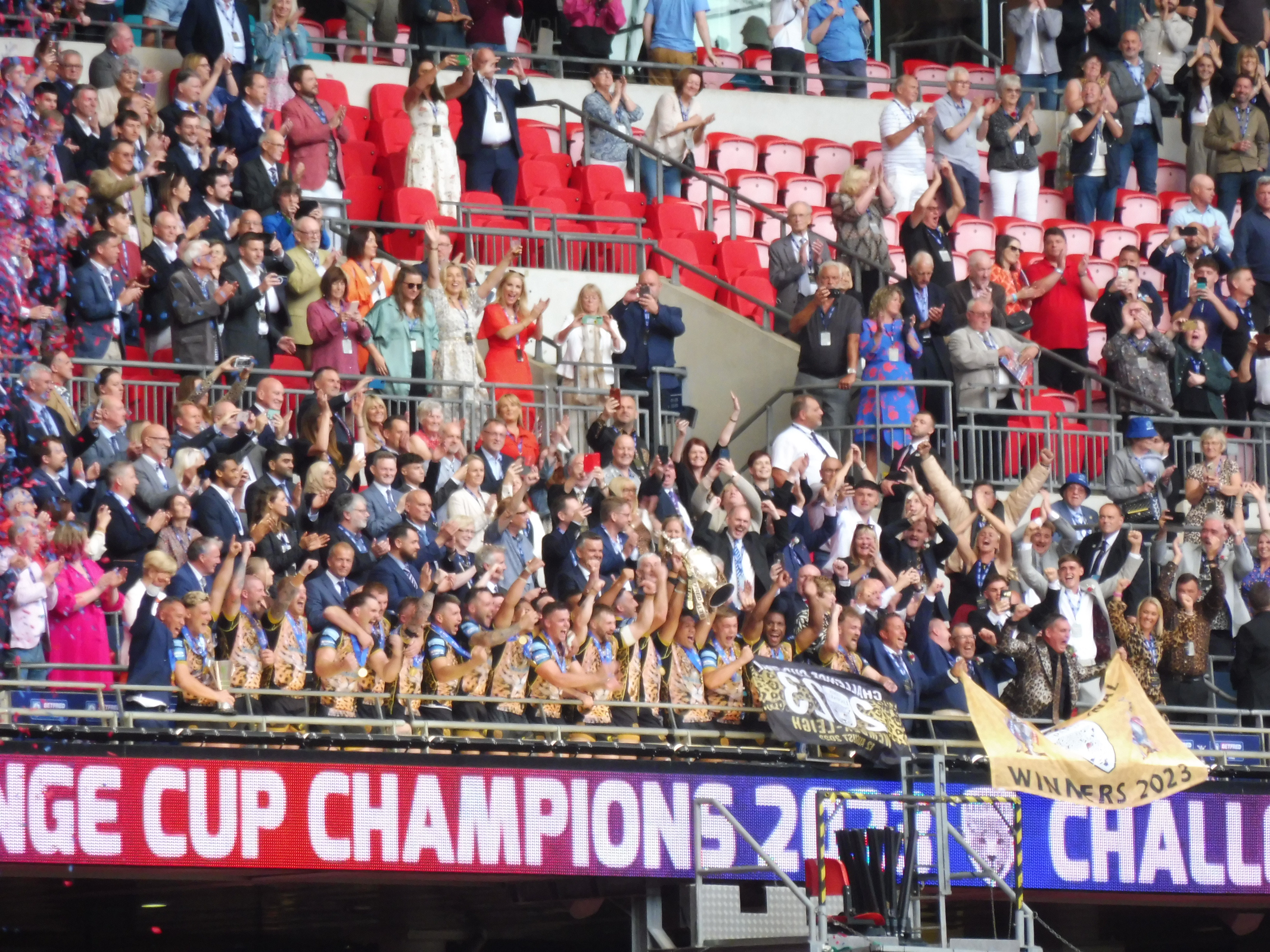
- Leigh Leopards lifting the Challenge Cup at Wembley Stadium for the first time in over 50 years.
- Country: England
- Governing body: Rugby Football League (RFL)
- National team: Men's · women's
- First played: 1895; 131 years ago
- Registered players: 100,821
- Clubs: 385 clubs

National competitions
- Men's competition: Rugby League World Cup

Club competitions
- League: Men's competition Super League Championship National Conference League Cumbria ARL London & South East East Rugby League South-West ARL North-West League Yorkshire League Midlands ARL North East RLSport overview; Women's competition RFL Women's Super League; RFL Women's Championship: Cups: Men's competition Challenge Cup 1895 Cup Women's competition Women's Challenge Cup

Rugby league is played across England but is most popular in Northern England, especially Yorkshire and Lancashire where the game originated. These areas are the heartland of rugby league. The sport is also popular in Cumbria where the amateur game is particularly powerful.

== Name ==
Within its Northern heartlands, rugby league is often referred to as "rugby", a term that in the rest of England would normally refer to rugby union, and occasionally as "football", which even in the North of England normally refers to association football.

== History ==
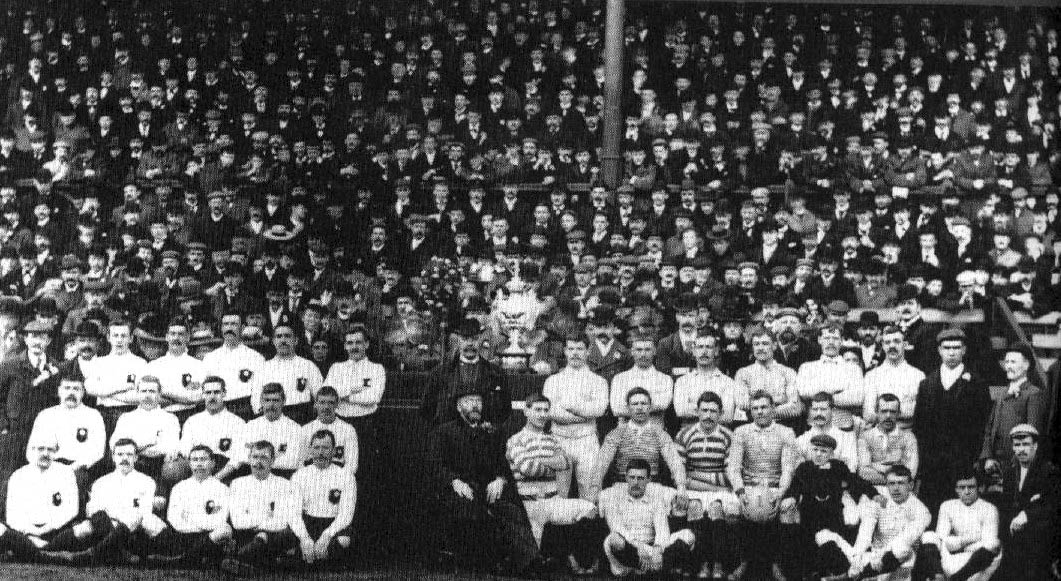
The first ever Challenge Cup final, 1897: Batley (left) vs St. Helens (right)

=== Foundations ===
Rugby has long been popular in the North of England and by the 1880s the region's clubs had come to dominate. The game was popular amongst working class people, unlike the clubs in Southern England whose players belonged to the middle or upper class. Rugby competition at the time did not allow paying players any wages; the working class players felt they could not afford time off to train and play, nor could they afford to miss work through injury sustained whilst playing. The principle of amateurism, and issues of class ensured that the Rugby Football Union would not countenance professional rugby.

In August 1895, representatives of the northern clubs met at the George Hotel, Huddersfield to form the "Northern Rugby Football Union" (NRFU). The NRFU was initially vehemently anti-professional, allowing only payments for time missed from other employment. A thriving amateur scene also soon developed, as local amateur clubs wished to maintain links with their "Northern Union" neighbours.

The Northern Union made reforms to the laws in 1897 and again in 1906 in an effort make the game more exciting. This resulted in Northern Union football becoming a sport in its own right rather than a form of rugby union.

The sport spread outside England and soon international matches began to be played. The first international match was played in 1904 as England was beaten 9–3 at Central Park, Wigan by "Other Nationalities" (largely Welsh players). This was followed by a tour of Britain by New Zealand in 1907. New Zealand met Great Britain in Great Britain's first ever Test match at Headingley, Leeds on 18 January 1908. The same year the first Australian Kangaroos tourists visited Britain. In 1910 the first British tour to Australia and New Zealand took place.

The Challenge Cup began in 1897 with Batley beating St Helens to win the first title. The final was first broadcast by BBC radio in 1927. The Wembley tradition was started in 1929 when Wigan beat Dewsbury 13–2 at the first Rugby League Challenge Cup to be held at Wembley.

Rugby league continued to be played throughout the 1914–15 season, however, the loss of players to the First World War, a government ban on professionalism and reduced attendances forced all major competitions to be replaced by regional competitions. The NRFU became the Rugby Football League in 1922.

The 1930s saw a series of failed attempts to introduce rugby league football to London.

During the Second World War professional rugby league was again discontinued, normal leagues were suspended, a War Emergency League was established, with clubs playing separate Yorkshire and Lancashire sections to reduce the need for travel.

=== Post-war ===
In 1948 the first televised rugby league match was played when Wigan's 8–3 Challenge Cup Final victory over Bradford Northern was broadcast to the Midlands. In another first this was the first rugby league match to be attended by the reigning monarch, King George VI, who presented the trophy.

Several attempts were made to expand the game outside the heartlands, a Southern Amateur Rugby League being formed in 1949, however only Cumberland and southern areas of the West Riding of Yorkshire proved receptive with teams being founded in Workington, Whitehaven and Doncaster. Nonetheless the game survived, and continued to maintain popularity in its home regions. The introduction of regular internationals as other countries took up the sport provided a fillip.

Rugby league experienced a surge in interest following the end of the Second World War. Large crowds came to be the norm for a period of around 20 years. The total crowds for the British season hit a record in 1949–50, when over 69.8 million paying customers attended all matches. The 1953–54 Challenge Cup Final replay between Halifax and Warrington, held at Odsal Stadium, Bradford, drew 102,575 paying spectators with an estimated 20,000 others getting in free after a section of fencing collapsed.

The boom had begun to subside by the early 1960s; rugby league now had to compete against television and other new forms of entertainment and attendances began to fall. David Attenborough, then controller of BBC2, made the decision to screen games from a new competition the BBC2 Floodlit Trophy in 1965. It proved a success, and rugby league has featured on television ever since.

Attendances fell even further in the 1970s. Britain won the Ashes for the last time in 1970, with a 2–1 series win in Australia.

The foundation of the Universities and Colleges Rugby League in 1969 and the British Amateur Rugby League Association in 1973 was a response to the need to develop the game below professional level.

=== 1980–1990 ===
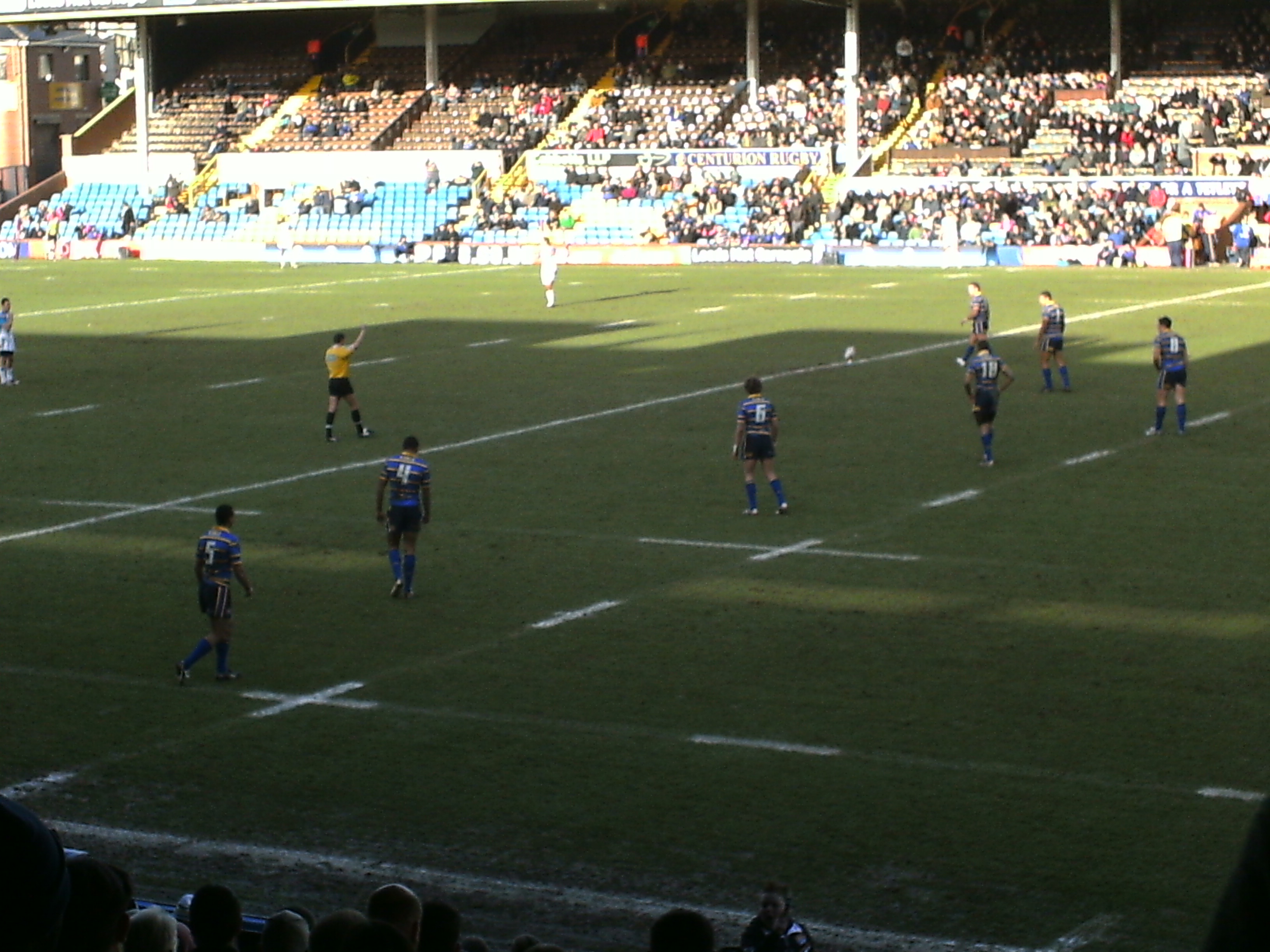
Leeds playing at the 2008 Boxing Day friendly against Wakefield Trinity at Headingley, Leeds

In 1980, Fulham F.C. formed a rugby league team, with the intention of creating another income stream for the association football club. The Rugby Football League was keen to expand outside the heartlands and accepted the new club (now known as London Broncos). This was not the first rugby league club to be based in London — three London-based clubs had come and gone in the 1930s — but unlike past ventures the new team survived despite several moves and name changes, and are now London Broncos.

The 1982 Kangaroos won all their tour games for first time ever, and became known as "The Invincibles". This was the time when the gap between English and Australian rugby league became apparent and has never been fully closed.

The All-Party Parliamentary Rugby League Group was formed in 1987 to support the sport of rugby league and tackle the key issues facing the game in Parliament. Ian McCartney MP was the first chairman and David Hinchliffe MP the secretary. In 1987 a "free gangway" between the two codes of rugby at amateur level was introduced but individual cases of discrimination continued, resulting in the Sports (Discrimination) Bill, which was introduced by David Hinchcliffe in 1994.

In the mid 1980s Wigan began an era of domination of English rugby league that would end only with the formation of Super League. By 1995 they had won the Challenge Cup a record eight consecutive times and the league title for a record seven consecutive times.

The traditional Origin series between Yorkshire and Lancashire was abandoned in 1989. Although the matches had provided a good test for selecting players for the full England and Great Britain sides, the crowds had been poor and the games had little attraction for the rest of the country. The series was revived again in 2001 before being abandoned in 2003.

The Combined Services Rugby League (CSRL) was formed in 1994 after the official recognition of rugby league by the armed services, since then rugby league has been the fastest growing army sport. The rival code rugby union went professional in 1995 and, as a result, other restrictions on rugby league were relaxed by the Rugby Football Union. This opened up the possibility of expanding the game into areas where it had never been played before as it allowed rugby league clubs to groundshare with rugby union clubs and for union players to try out the other code without fear of persecution.

=== 1995–present: Summer era ===
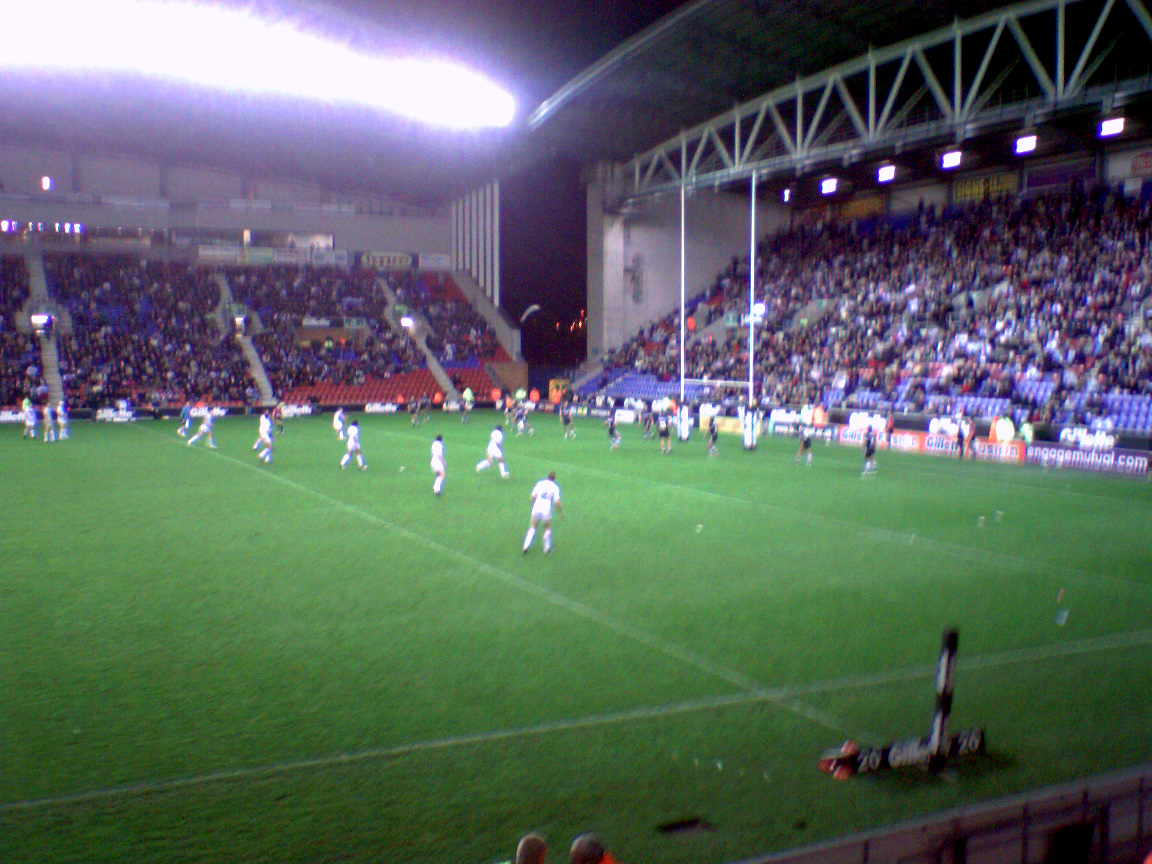
The final home Test for Great Britain against New Zealand in 2007

In 1995, the fallout from the Super League war hit Britain, and the game underwent massive re-organisation. A new elite league, Super League was formed, and the sport switched from a winter to a summer season. Super League has largely been a success as the value of its TV contract and top tier game crowd attendances and have both grown year upon year since 2001.

The Rugby League Conference was founded in 1998 with the aim of providing regular fixtures for new clubs based outside the 'heartland' of rugby league. It began with fourteen teams, but within nine years had grown to eighty-eight clubs spread throughout England and the rest of Britain.

== Governing bodies ==
=== Rugby Football League ===
The Rugby Football League (RFL) is the governing body for the sport in England. Previously, before the emergence of Wales Rugby League, Scotland Rugby League and Rugby League Ireland the RFL had control over the whole United Kingdom.

The RFL are affiliated with International Rugby League (IRL) and European Rugby League (ERL). The Community Board is made up of representatives of the RFL, BARLA, Combined Services, English Schools Rugby League and Student Rugby League.

=== British Amateur Rugby League Association ===
British Amateur Rugby League Association (BARLA) are responsible for amateur rugby league chiefly in the sport's north of England heartlands. Though many Rugby League Conference teams are affiliated to BARLA, the Conference itself is not a BARLA organisation. The top division under their control is the National Conference League, with regional leagues including the North West Counties and Pennine leagues. BARLA selects an international team consisting of amateur players, the BARLA Lions. This team tours many parts of the rugby league world, and have competed in the Rugby League Emerging Nations Tournament.

=== Armed Forces ===
Rugby league was recognised as a military sport in 1994. The Combined Services Rugby League (CSRL) is the co-ordinating group for the Army Rugby League, Royal Navy Rugby League and the Royal Air Force Rugby League. Each constituent body organises its own competitions at unit and formation level. Players are fed into representative teams to represent each of the services, and the best players are selected to represent the Combined Services.

=== Women's Amateur Rugby League Association ===
The Women's Amateur Rugby League Association (WARLA) is the governing body of female rugby league in the United Kingdom; it currently falls under the Rugby Football League association which oversees its running and management. It was originally established in 1985 and was recognised by the RFL in its first year.

=== Touch Rugby ===
In December 2021, the RFL agreed a new partnership with the England Touch Association, the national governing body for touch rugby.

The two bodies aim to work closely together in a formal relationship in 2022, when England will host the delayed European Touch Championships in Nottingham.

=== Tag Rugby ===
The RFL is the governing body of Try Tag Rugby, which delivers mixed, men’s and women’s leagues for adults across the country.

== Open age competitions ==
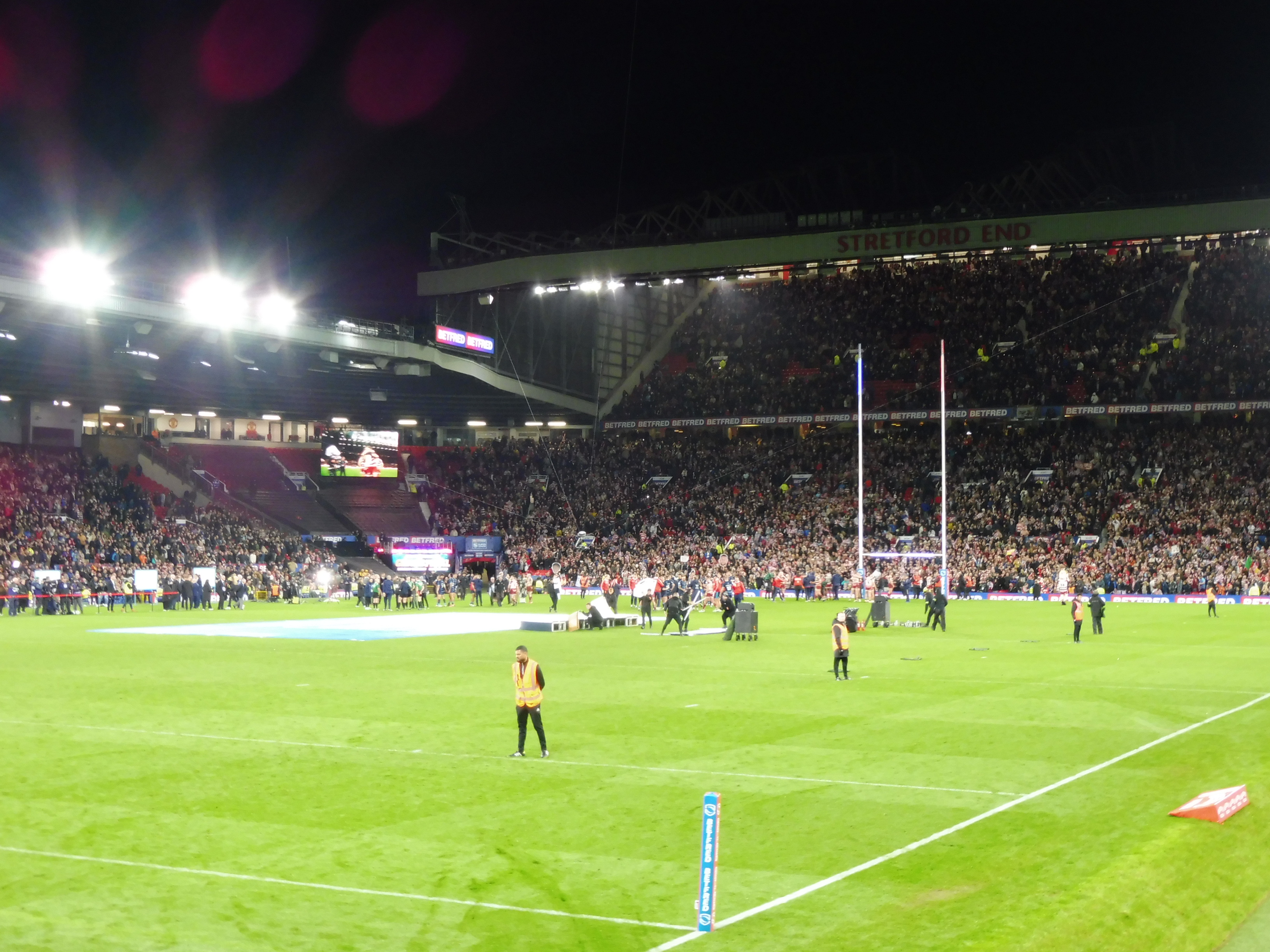
2024 Super League Grand Final between the Wigan Warriors and Hull KR, hosted at Old Trafford

=== Super League ===
Super League is the top league for the game in Europe; eleven of the twelve teams are based in England. It is the only full-time professional rugby league competition operating in the Northern Hemisphere. The French team Paris Saint-Germain competed in the first Super League season but folded in 1999. French presence was re-established in 2006 when Catalans Dragons were admitted to Super League. In 2009, Super League added Celtic Crusaders from Wales, which renamed themselves Crusaders Rugby League after that season; that team effectively folded after the 2011 season. The winner of the league is awarded the League Leaders' Shield whilst the overall winner of Super League is determined by play-offs and a grand final.

The winner of the Super League plays the winner of the Australian NRL competition in the World Club Challenge.

==== Attendances ====
The Super League clubs with an average home attendance of at least 10,000 in 2026:

#	Club	Average
1	Wigan Warriors	15,937
2	Leeds Rhinos	15,809
3	Hull FC	13,119
4	Hull KR	11,628
5	St. Helens RFC	11,381
6	Warrington Wolves	10,388

=== Championship and League 1 ===
Below Super League, there are the Championship and League 1. The Championship currently has 14 clubs and League 1 has 11. The 2015 season marked the return of a promotion and relegation system between Super League and the Championship; from 2009 through to 2014 promotion between the Championship and Super League had been on a licensed, or franchised, basis. Promotion and relegation between the leagues now known as the Championship and League 1 has long existed, including during the 2009–14 period.

Following the 2014 season, the professional leagues underwent a major reorganisation. Super League and the Championship were both reduced from 14 clubs to 12, and League 1 was expanded from nine clubs to 14. The season structures of both Super League and the Championship were radically changed, and that of League 1 was more modestly changed.

Wales became represented in the Championships starting in 2010 with the entry of South Wales Scorpions into League 1 and North Wales Crusaders in 2012. Toulouse Olympique of France played in the Championship in the past, and returned to the British league system in 2016, initially playing in League 1 and now in the Championship. The Toronto Wolfpack from Canada joined League 1 in 2017 and won the title in its inaugural season, thereby earning promotion to the Championship for 2018. All other clubs in both divisions are based in England, and of these, only London Broncos of the Championship and Newcastle Thunder, London Skolars, Gloucestershire All Golds, Hemel Stags, Coventry Bears and Oxford Rugby League of League 1 are based outside the heartlands.

=== Challenge Cup ===
The Rugby League Challenge Cup remains as a knock-out competition, though entry has now been expanded to make it a pan-European tournament bringing in teams from France, Canada and the rest of the UK; Russian teams have previously featured. Amateur teams also have the chance to participate in the Challenge Cup and have been victorious over several Championship sides.

=== National Conference League ===
BARLA administer different amateur competitions which traditionally ran throughout the winter in the heartlands but have mostly switched over to a summer season. The leading competition is the National Conference League which consists of four divisions (Premier Division, Division One, Division Two and Division Three) of up to 14 teams each. Other major amateur leagues include the Yorkshire Men's League, North West Men's League, Pennine League, Cumberland League, Barrow & District League and the Hull & District League. Teams from these regional leagues can apply for election to the National Conference League if they meet minimum criteria.

The Rugby League Conference, which ran until 2011, was mostly composed of teams outside the heartlands. It has subsequently been replaced by a series of regional leagues across England, Scotland and Wales. Successor leagues in England include: Conference League South, Midlands Rugby League, North East Rugby League, South West Rugby League, East Men's League, South Premier, London & South East Men's League.

=== Defunct competitions ===
At various times English clubs have either competed in a national Championship with a Second Division and sometimes a Third Division as well or had separate county leagues for Yorkshire and Lancashire.

There were also county cups for Yorkshire and Lancashire between 1905 and 1993. The Regal Trophy and BBC2 Floodlit Trophy were two other knock-out tournaments. A Trans-Pennine Cup was played for a short-time but it was replaced by the National League Cup.

The Rugby League Charity Shield was a one-off match at the beginning of each season between 1985 and 1995. It was contested by the Champions and the holders of the Challenge Cup.

The rugby union county championship was continued as a rugby league County Championship after the 1895 great schism. Teams representing Yorkshire, Lancashire, Cumberland / Cumbria and sometimes Cheshire and Northumberland & Durham took part in the championship. This continued as the Rugby League War of the Roses played between Yorkshire and Lancashire.

The Championship Cup was a cup competition for the Championship and Championship 1 (now League 1).

== National teams ==
=== England ===
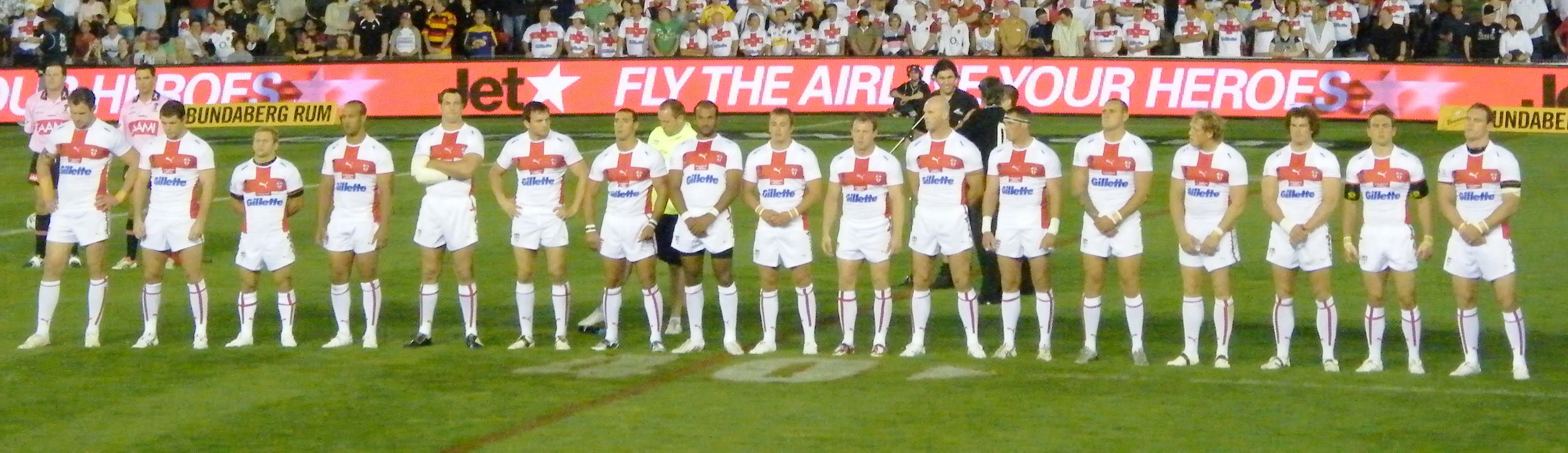
The national team at the 2008 World Cup

On 5 April 1904, England played their first game, losing 9–3 to Other Nationalities in a 12-a-side match at Wigan. With the exception of 1975, England was represented by Great Britain in international tournaments, but since 1995 has competed as a standalone nation. Unlike Great Britain, an England side has never won the World Cup, and non-World Cup matches involving England were not deemed to have Test status, which applied only to the full Great Britain side.

Outside of the World Cup, England are one of three automatic qualifiers to the Rugby League Four Nations, alongside New Zealand and Australia, finishing as losing finalists at the inaugural tournament in 2009. Regular tests against France have seen England go undefeated since 1981, with an International Origin series occasionally played against overseas players based in the Super League to provide stronger competition.

Between 1935 and 2004 England competed in the European Nations Cup. In recent years they had come to dominate this tournament, and in 2005 they withdrew to level the playing field, with a return planned for 2023.

In the reduced formats of the game, England took part in the defunct Rugby League World Sevens in 2002 and 2003, losing in the latter final to Parramatta Eels. The 2019 Rugby League World Cup 9s saw England reach the semi-final, losing to New Zealand at Bankwest Stadium, Sydney.

A developmental England Knights team has been selected since 2002. Previously known as England A, the Knights consist of promising players who miss out on selection to the senior squad. An England Lionhearts squad is selected from the Rugby League Conference, competing annually with the other home nations in the Amateur Four Nations, as well as fixtures against other nations.

=== Great Britain ===
The Great Britain side is also referred to as "the Lions" or "the British Lions". At international level the Women's Great Britain side is commonly referred to as the Great Britain Lionesses.

England historically provided the vast majority of players for the Great Britain team, one of the major national teams playing rugby league. They compete against Australia for the Ashes, and New Zealand for the Baskerville Shield.

The first Great Britain match took place on 18 January 1908 when they beat New Zealand 14–6 at Headingley. Apart from the 1975 tournament, Great Britain took part in the Rugby League World Cup from its inception in 1954 until 1992, winning the tournament on three occasions: 1954, 1960 and 1972.

Great Britain also played in the Rugby League Tri-Nations until 2006 against New Zealand and Australia. Although Great Britain never won the tournament, they finished top of the table in 2005, losing to Australia in the final.

In 2007 Great Britain was replaced by separate teams for each of the home nations, returning only for a 2019 tour of New Zealand and Papua New Guinea. Two losses against the Kiwis in Auckland and Christchurch were book-ended by defeats against Tonga in Hamilton and Papua New Guinea in Port Moresby The whitewash attracted criticism from the British rugby league press, with the future viability of the team called into question.

== Player awards ==
The main two awards are the Lance Todd Trophy which is awarded to the Man-of-the-Match in the Challenge Cup Final whether on the winning or losing side and the Man of Steel Award which is the annual award for the best player in Super League.

The Albert Goldthorpe Medal is an award that has been created by Rugby Leaguer & League Express to honour the leading players in Super League.

The Rugby League World Golden Boot Award is given to the international player of the year, as determined by a ballot of international rugby league writers and broadcasters. Until 2007, this was accompanied by the RLIF Awards which rewarded the best referee, coach, developing nations player, international newcomer, captain and a team of the year.

== Derbies ==
Many of the professional teams are separated by only a few miles but not all matches between teams from the same traditional county are considered derbies. There has been some debate as to whether St. Helens versus Wigan or Bradford versus Leeds is the biggest derby in English rugby league but there is only one same city derby in the Super League – Hull F.C. v Hull Kingston Rovers.

Some of the teams involved no longer play in the same league and so derby games are either arranged as pre-season friendlies or take place as part of the Challenge Cup.

== Junior rugby league ==
Rugby league is played at a school level in many schools in the heartlands; recently it has been introduced into some schools outside the traditional areas in particular in London and Hertfordshire.

The RFL uses two modified forms of rugby league created by ARL Development in Australia. Mini league (known as mini footy in Australia) is played by all children up to Year 4 of Primary School. It is designed to provide children with a safe environment, a firm knowledge of the laws of rugby league and a chance to practice the skills such as tackling, passing and common defensive and attacking tactics. Players up to and including Year 6 of Primary School play mod league. Mod league is a bridge between mini league and full contact rugby league. On completion of mod league, players make a move to full international rugby league laws.

The Champion Schools tournament is a national competition for secondary schools. In the 2005/06 academic year over 1,200 teams and 20,000 players competed in the Champion Schools tournament, making it the largest rugby league competition in the world. Eighty percent of participants are new to rugby league. The growth of the Champion Schools tournament led to the creation of the Carnegie Champion Colleges competition for Years 12 and 13. The regionally based competition was introduced in 2008 and started in January.

British Amateur Rugby League Association runs the Gilette National Youth League as well as the Yorkshire combination, Hull Youth and Junior and London Junior League.

Super League and National League teams run academy sides to develop young talent. Players under the age of 21 years are eligible to play for the senior academy, the rules also permit three players over the age of 21 to play in academy matches. Junior academies are the second tier in the Youth Development system. Only players under the age of 18 years are eligible to play for the junior academy; no players over the age limit are allowed to play. Some of the better junior academy players may get experience in the senior academy and it is not uncommon for some players to play regularly in both junior and senior academies.

== Student Rugby League ==
Although the game remains close to its working class origins, changes in social demographics and attitudes have allowed many working-class people to attend university where they have continued their association with the game.

The Student Rugby League was founded in 1967 when a team was created at Leeds University by Andrew Cudbertson, Jack Abernathy and Cec Thompson, other teams soon joined in areas of the United Kingdom which lay outside of the games traditional heartlands.

The first university game was between Leeds and Liverpool in 1968. A year later the Universities and Colleges Rugby League was formed after student pioneers fought hard to get the sport recognised in higher education. The first Oxford versus Cambridge University match took place in 1981. The varsity match has "discretionary full blue" status. The game is now played in over 70 universities.

Rugby league in universities has been an important vehicle for expansion of the game as players from outside the heartlands often first began to play at university level. Many continue to play after leaving university and this has led to the creation of teams in non-traditional areas such as London Skolars and Gloucestershire All Golds.

== Derivatives of rugby league ==
Rugby league sevens is particularly popular with pub teams drawn from the regulars at a pub; it is often difficult for a single public house to form a full squad of 13 players and 4 substitutes.

Rugby league nines is the more common form of the shortened version of the game. The Carnegie Floodlit Nines, Middlesex 9s and the York International 9s are three of the best known rugby league nines tournaments in England. The York nines began in 2002 and the Middlesex nines a year later. All three competitions feature professional and amateur teams from England as well as teams from abroad.

Touch Rugby is administered by Rugby Football League through a product known as Play Touch Rugby League.

Try Tag Rugby are the RFL's official Tag Rugby League partners, running leagues in London, Yorkshire and the Thames Valley.

Wheelchair rugby league was first introduced to England in 2005. The first competitive league began in 2009.

Masters Rugby League which uses modified rules to allow older players to continue playing has only recently arrived in England and is not widely played.

== Stadiums ==
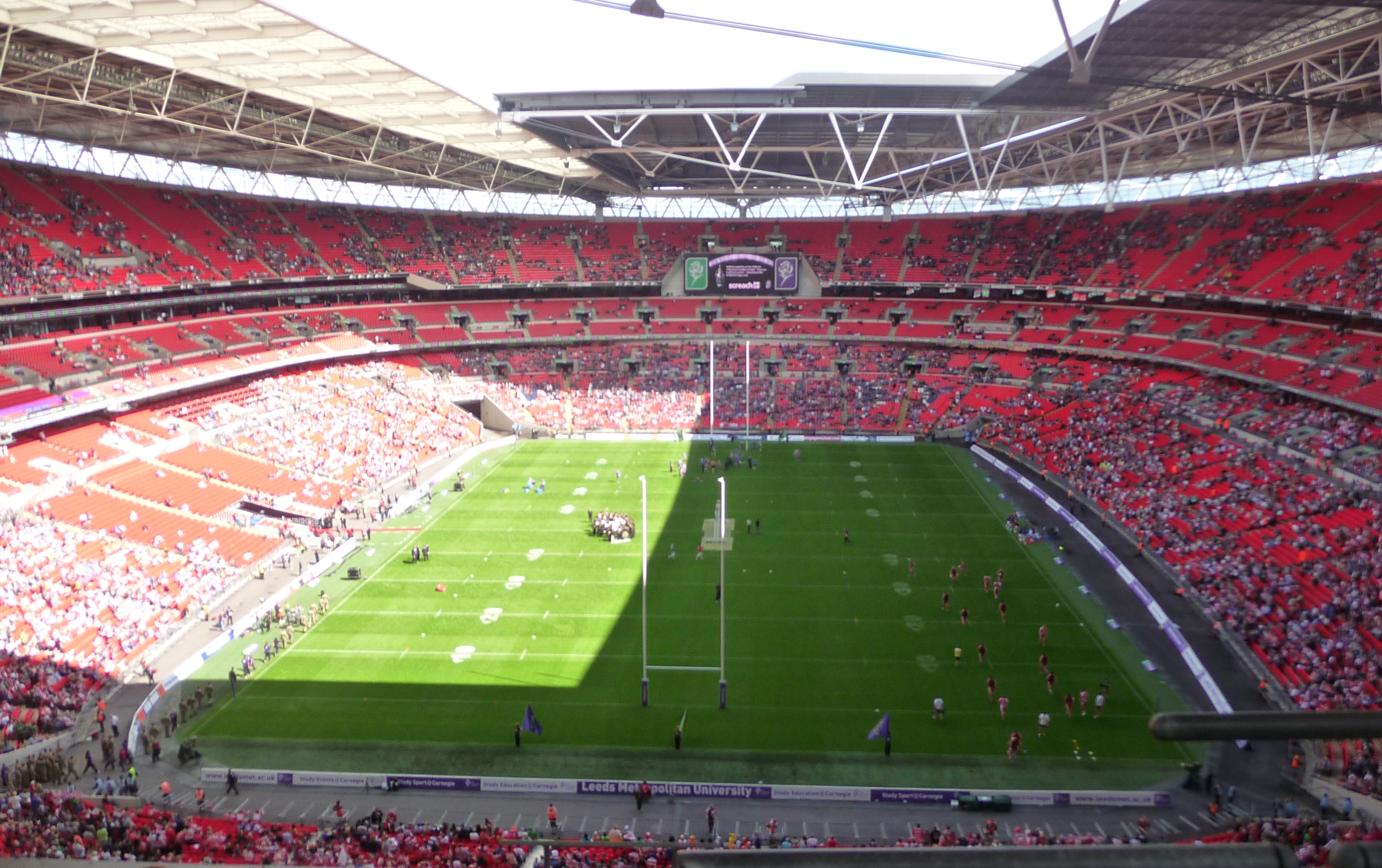
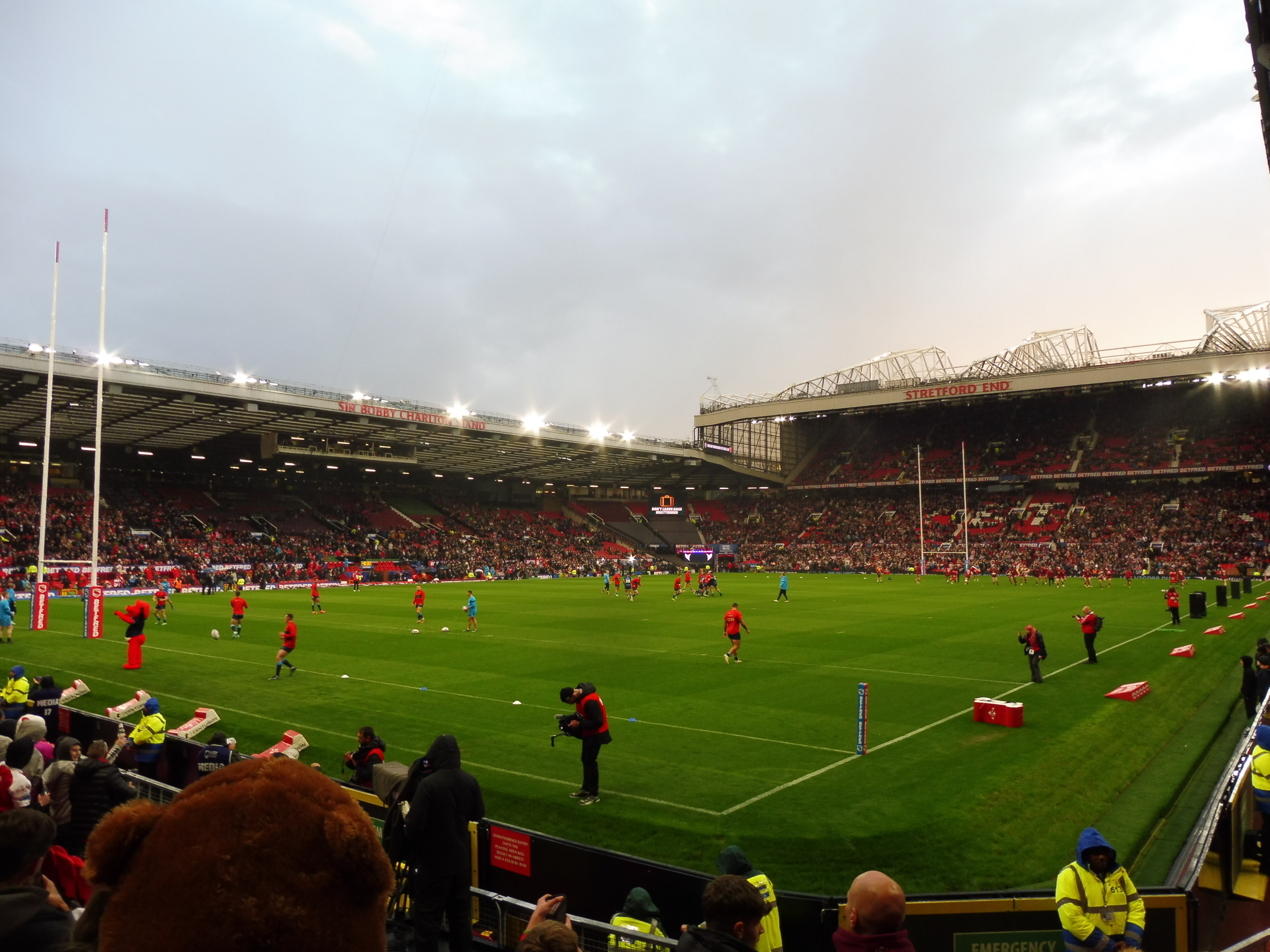
Wembley and Old Trafford host the two major domestic finals in England.

There are 36 stadiums in England considered to be rugby league stadiums, most of these are shared with association football teams. The largest club venue is the Odsal Stadium, home of Bradford Bulls, and has a capacity of 27,500.

There is no national stadium for rugby league in England. Despite this Wembley Stadium is annually used as the venue of the Challenge Cup Final, and Old Trafford as the venue of the Super League Grand Final.

The Super League's Magic Weekend is used to promote rugby league to a wider audience. The Millennium Stadium, Murrayfield, Etihad Stadium, St James' Park, and Anfield have all been used to host the event. Elland Road will host the 2024 Super League Magic Weekend.

== Popularity ==
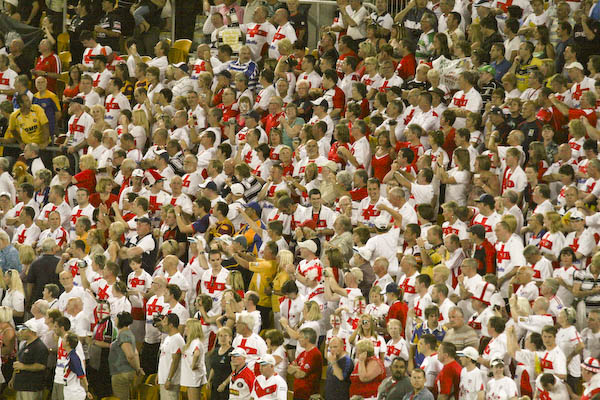
English rugby league fans during the 2008 Rugby League World Cup

Rugby league is the fourth most popular team sport in England. Historically, rugby league has been the second biggest spectator sport in England with 6.8 million spectators attending the 1948–1949 English season.

Rugby league is most popular in its traditional heartlands and, in those areas, interest in the sport can rival that of association football. Many large towns with rugby league traditions do not have football teams as a result of the monopoly on local interest: these towns include, Keighley, Castleford, Dewsbury, Batley and Wakefield.

The regions in which rugby league is played most are Cumbria, where the amateur version has a high participation rate, former traditional Lancashire regions Merseyside and Greater Manchester, Yorkshire and Cheshire. There is also significant schools participation in London. Many of the professional and semi-professional teams are connected by the M62 motorway and so the term "M62 corridor" is sometimes used to refer to the area where rugby league is most popular. An old survey from 1994 showed that back then, sixty per cent of people regularly attending rugby league lived in only four postal districts along the M62. The sport has since launched several expansion teams in the south.

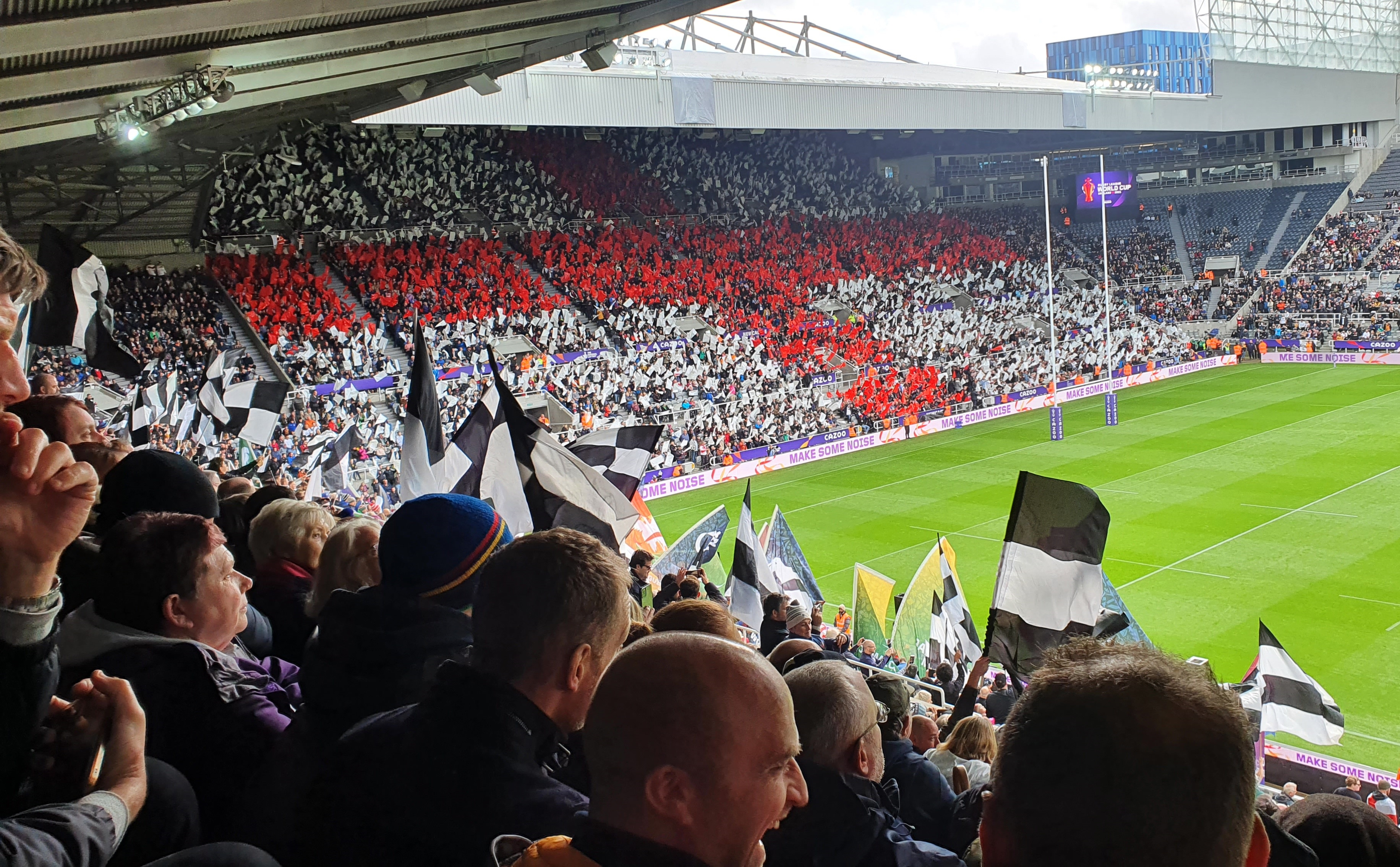
The Saint George's Cross being made by fans at England's opening match of the 2021 Rugby League World Cup at St James' Park

Fifty per cent of viewers who watch rugby league on Sky Sports live in the South of England. Over 40% of active rugby league supporters are female. At the beginning of the 2006 season there were between thirty and forty female-only rugby league clubs running in England, not including clubs that have teams of both sexes. The majority of these clubs are located in Lancashire and Yorkshire.

Rugby league has for much of its history been banned in the armed forces and in many schools and universities, further stifling growth. These barriers have largely been dismantled since professionalisation of rugby union.

The 2006 Super League generated the highest weekly average attendance in the 11-year history of the competition. The average weekly attendance for the regular season stood at 9,026, generated by an aggregate attendance of 1,516,342 supporters. This is an increase on the 2005 season average of 8,887. The attendances are not evenly spread between clubs within Super League; whilst the best supported team, Leeds with average gates of 15,683, a couple of clubs failed to attract averages of above 5,000. Crowds at matches below the top flight can exceed 3,500, however most of the clubs in this division have attendances lower than this.

Although attendances outside Super League can be quite low, many of the teams play in small towns and the attendance figures represent a large percentage of the local population; as far down as amateur level. An example is Saddleworth Rangers which represents a largely rural area to the east of Oldham towards the Pennines; however the club's stadium contains a covered seated stand and triple figure support for home games.

=== Current trends ===
The success of Super League in England and the return of competitive international matches with Australia and New Zealand have seen growth for the sport.

The ending of discrimination against rugby league resulting from professionalism in rugby union led to an increase in numbers in the amateur game, with many rugby union amateurs keen to try out the other code. In 2004 the Rugby Football League was able to report a 94% increase in registered players in just two years, whilst attendance figures for Super League matches rose 8% from the 2003 season.

The annual Champion Schools competition from 2003 onwards has increased the number of school teams from 300 to 1,500 and the participation levels to 25,000 from 6,000. Though these figures include participants from Wales. The number of participants involved in the 2011–12 Carnegie Champion schools tournament was a record 30,713 players across 1819 teams making it the largest rugby league competition in the world.

Whilst rugby union was officially an amateur sport, many rugby union players came to play rugby league. In recent years this trend has reversed and some rugby league players have crossed codes to play union.

Expansion by the governing body, the Rugby Football League sees continual growth in the south of England, notably the London area, which now boasts three professional clubs. These are, London Broncos, London Skolars and Hemel Stags. One of the prime vehicles for expansion has been the Rugby League Conference, a set of competitions for clubs in those development areas.

== Media ==
=== Publications ===
In 1989 George Moorhouse's At the George was shortlisted for the inaugural William Hill Sports Book of the Year.

There are two weekly rugby league newspapers, Rugby Leaguer & League Express with around 23,000 subscribers and League Weekly with around 11,000 subscribers. In and around the heartlands, these publications are stocked in newsagents but in the rest of England they are only available via subscription. There are also two monthly magazines, Rugby League World and Forty-20, which can be bought throughout the UK. The Rugby League Journal appears quarterly.

=== Television ===
BBC Sport own the rights to broadcast a highlights package called the Super League Show which is broadcast commonly on the Monday night on BBC One, however only in the North West England, Yorkshire, Lincolnshire and North East England BBC television regions. Since 2008 however it has been repeated on BBC Two nationally as well as the regional broadcast on BBC One.

End of season play-offs are shown across the whole country in a highlights package. The BBC covers the Rugby League Challenge Cup from the rounds in which the top clubs enter with the final attracting over 4 million viewers. The Challenge Cup final is considered by government to constitute a "listed event" which must be shown by a free-to-air channel available to at least 95% of the UK population.

Sky Sports has the rights to show live Super League and National Rugby League games. Live Super League matches are broadcast often fronted by Mike Stephenson and Eddie Hemmings and are regularly rank amongst the top 10 most watched programmes in a week on Sky Sports with more than 250,000 viewers. Highlights are shown on Boots N' All which is shown on Sky Sports and is rebroadcast on the Internet. Sky also hold the rights to show the Rugby League Four Nations live, whilst highlights are shown on BBC Sport. The Australian State of Origin series is currently shown on Sky. The current TV rights deal for Engage Superleague is worth approximately 50 million pounds over 3 years, beginning from 2009. Since 2022, Channel 4 has shown 10 Super League matches across the season. Premier Sports has also aired one RFL Championship match per week.

=== Radio ===
BBC Radio 5 Live and BBC Radio 5 Sports Extra carry commentary from a selection of Super League matches each week, while BBC local radio also broadcasts throughout the season.

- BBC London 94.9 covers London Broncos and London Skolars.
- BBC Radio Cumbria report on Barrow, Whitehaven and Workington Town throughout the season as well as the local amateur scene throughout their season on The Rugby League Show.
- BBC Radio Humberside broadcasts both Hull F.C. and Hull Kingston Rovers matches on The Oval Ball and does simultaneous broadcasts when games clash.
- BBC Radio Leeds covers Leeds, Hunslet, Keighley, Bradford, Halifax, Huddersfield, Batley, Dewsbury, Castleford, Wakefield Trinity and Featherstone Rovers.
- BBC Radio Sheffield covers Sheffield Eagles and Doncaster
- BBC Radio York cover York Knights
- BBC Radio Manchester covers Wigan, Warrington, Leigh, Oldham, Salford, Swinton and Rochdale Hornets.
- BBC Radio Merseyside gives live commentary of St. Helens, Widnes and Warrington.

=== Cinema ===
Rugby league first hit the silver screen with Where's George?, a 1935 comedy starring the comedian Sydney Howard. The plot revolves around Alf Scodger’s attempts to outwit his overbearing wife. As a consequence, he accidentally discovers a talent for rugby and turns out for his local Yorcaster club against Lancastrian rivals Oldcastle.

The 1963 film, This Sporting Life, is set around the life of a professional rugby league footballer, Frank Machin, whose romantic life is not as successful as his sporting life. The film stars Richard Harris, Rachel Roberts, Alan Badel and William Hartnell. It is considered to be one of the last major films of the British New Wave or "Free Cinema" movement. Many of the scenes in This Sporting Life were filmed at Wakefield Trinity's Belle Vue stadium and include some Trinity players and coaching staff (Ken Traill) in the background.

The highly acclaimed play, Up 'n' Under was made as a film in 1998. As a comedy set in the north of England that features a bunch of losers, it has been compared to The Full Monty and Brassed Off. The film stars Samantha Janus, Gary Olsen, Neil Morrissey, Brian Glover, Griff Rhys Jones and Tony Slattery. The play was recently revived on stage with England rugby union star Gareth Chilcott in the Gary Olsen role. The film follows the story of an inept pub team in a rugby league sevens competition.

=== Plays ===
The Changing Room is a 1971 play by David Storey, set in a men's changing room before, during and after a rugby league game. It premiered at the Royal Court Theatre in 1971. The 1973 Broadway production, directed by Michael Rudman, won several awards including the New York Drama Critics' Circle award for Best Play and the Tony Award for Best Featured Actor for John Lithgow.

Trinity Tales or The Road to Wembley, loosely based on Geoffrey Chaucer's Canterbury Tales, was performed by the Birmingham Repertory Theatre Company in 1975. It was later adapted into a television series and shown on BBC2.

Up 'n' Under is a comedy by English playwright John Godber, first staged at the Hull Truck Theatre in 1984. It won the Laurence Olivier Award for Best New Comedy that same year. The sequel, Up 'n' Under II, followed in 1985.

Mick Martin's play Broken Time is the first dramatic treatment of the historic events that led to the 1895 great schism.

== Rugby league and diversity ==
Rugby league has had a tradition of being inclusive and for some notable firsts in terms of black participation. Professional black players first took to the professional rugby league pitch prior to the First World War. George Bennett became the first black player to play for Great Britain while it was another 44 years before Viv Anderson became the first black footballer to play association football for England. Clive Sullivan became the first black captain of the Great Britain team in 1972, 21 years before Paul Ince became the first black captain of England's association football team. Roy Francis was the first black coach of a leading club, almost half a century before the top flight of English association football would have a black British manager, a milestone also achieved by Ince (on 22 June 2008). Ellery Hanley earned the distinction of being the first black coach of any British national sporting team when he took charge of Great Britain in the home Ashes series of 1994.

In 1997 the Rugby Football League launched a thirteen-point action plan aimed at tackling racism and encouraging the development of rugby league in Asian and black communities. Despite the sport being popular in West Yorkshire and the North West, which both have large South Asian communities, the sport has little following amongst South Asian communities. The British Asian Rugby Association (BARA) was set up in 2004 to encouraging participation in rugby among British Asians.

In 2012, the Rugby Football League were awarded the Stonewall Sport Award in recognition of their work in embracing inclusivity and tackling homophobia. They also became the first UK sporting organisation to make the top 100 employers in the Stonewall Index that measures attitudes towards lesbian, gay and bisexual staff.

== See also ==
- Sport in England
- Rugby league in the British Isles
- Rugby league in Yorkshire
- Rugby league in Lancashire
- British Rugby League Hall of Fame
- List of English rugby league stadiums by capacity
