= Rugby League Journal =

British rugby league periodical

- Issue 63 – Summer 2018
- Editor: Harry Edgar
- Categories: Sport
- Frequency: Quarterly
- Founded: 2002
- Country: United Kingdom
- Based in: Egremont
- Language: English
- Website: http://www.rugbyleaguejournal.com/

The Rugby League Journal is a British rugby league periodical that is published quarterly. It was founded in 2002.

The magazine is based in Egremont, near Whitehaven in Cumbria "for fans who don't want to forget" the game as it was prior to the arrival of Super League. Its editor is Harry Edgar, the founder of Open Rugby (now Rugby League World).

Much of its contents are pictures and comments from the post-Second World War era, 1950s-1970s and includes obituaries of some of rugby league's stars of those decades. It sells for £2.95 per issue.
