= Webb Ellis Rugby Football Museum =

Coordinates: 52.37107°N 1.2643°W

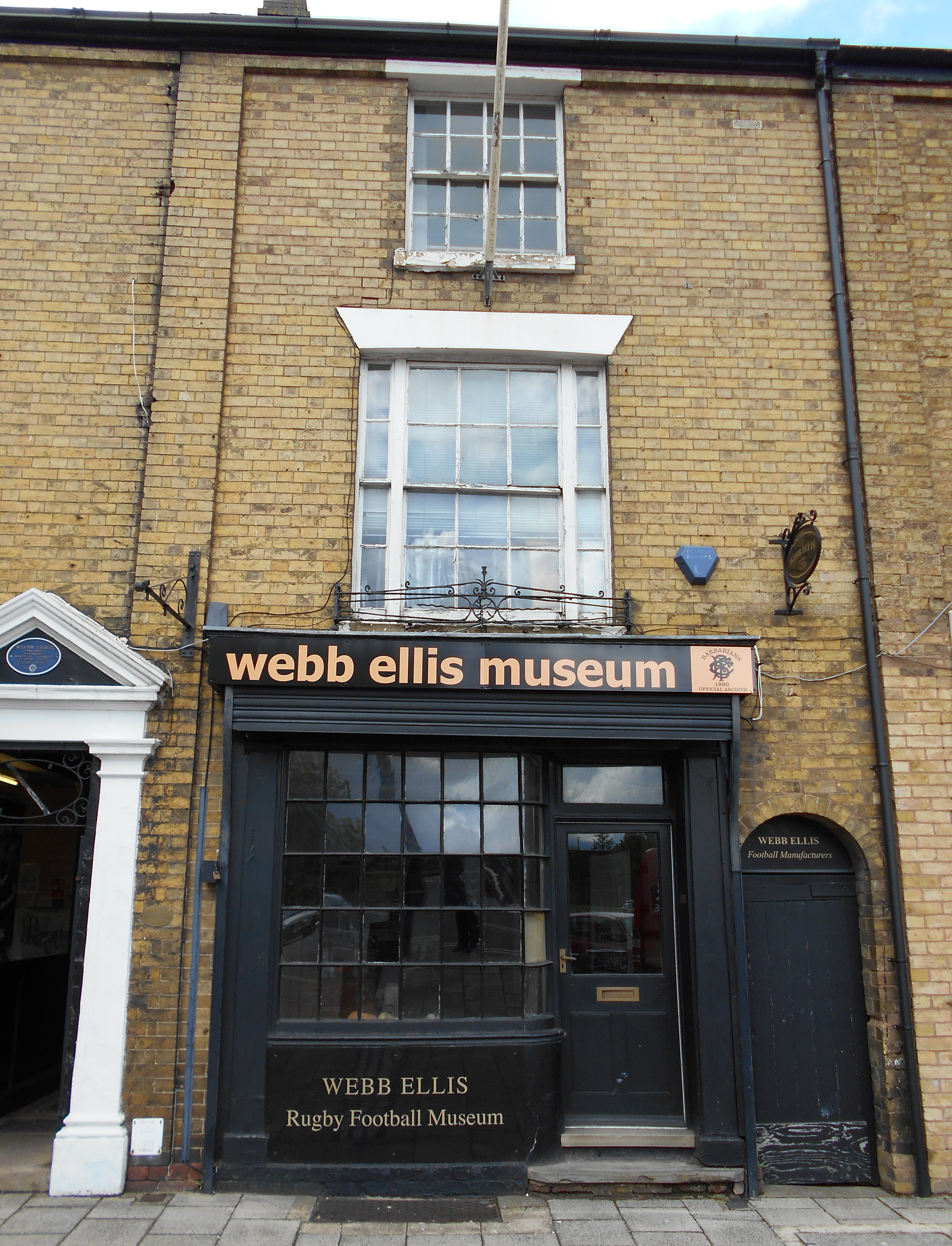
The Webb Ellis Rugby Football Museum

The Webb Ellis Rugby Football Museum is a rugby football museum in the town centre of Rugby in Warwickshire, England, near Rugby School. It takes its name from William Webb Ellis, who is credited with inventing the game of rugby football.

The building dates from 1842, and it historically housed the Gilbert company, makers of rugby footballs, founded by William Gilbert and his nephew James. In 1983, the company was taken over by Rodney Webb, a former England international rugby union player, who conceived the idea of turning the premises into a museum, as at the time there was no museum in Britain dedicated solely to the game of rugby football. It was opened to the public four years later in April 1987.

The museum is packed with much rugby memorabilia, including a Gilbert football of the kind used at Rugby School that was exhibited at the first World's Fair, at the Great Exhibition in London and the original Richard Lindon (inventor of the rubber bladder for rugby balls) brass hand pump. Traditional handmade rugby balls are still made at the museum.

== See also ==
- Rugby Museum (disambiguation page)
