= George Hotel, Huddersfield =

Hotel in Huddersfield, England

George Hotel
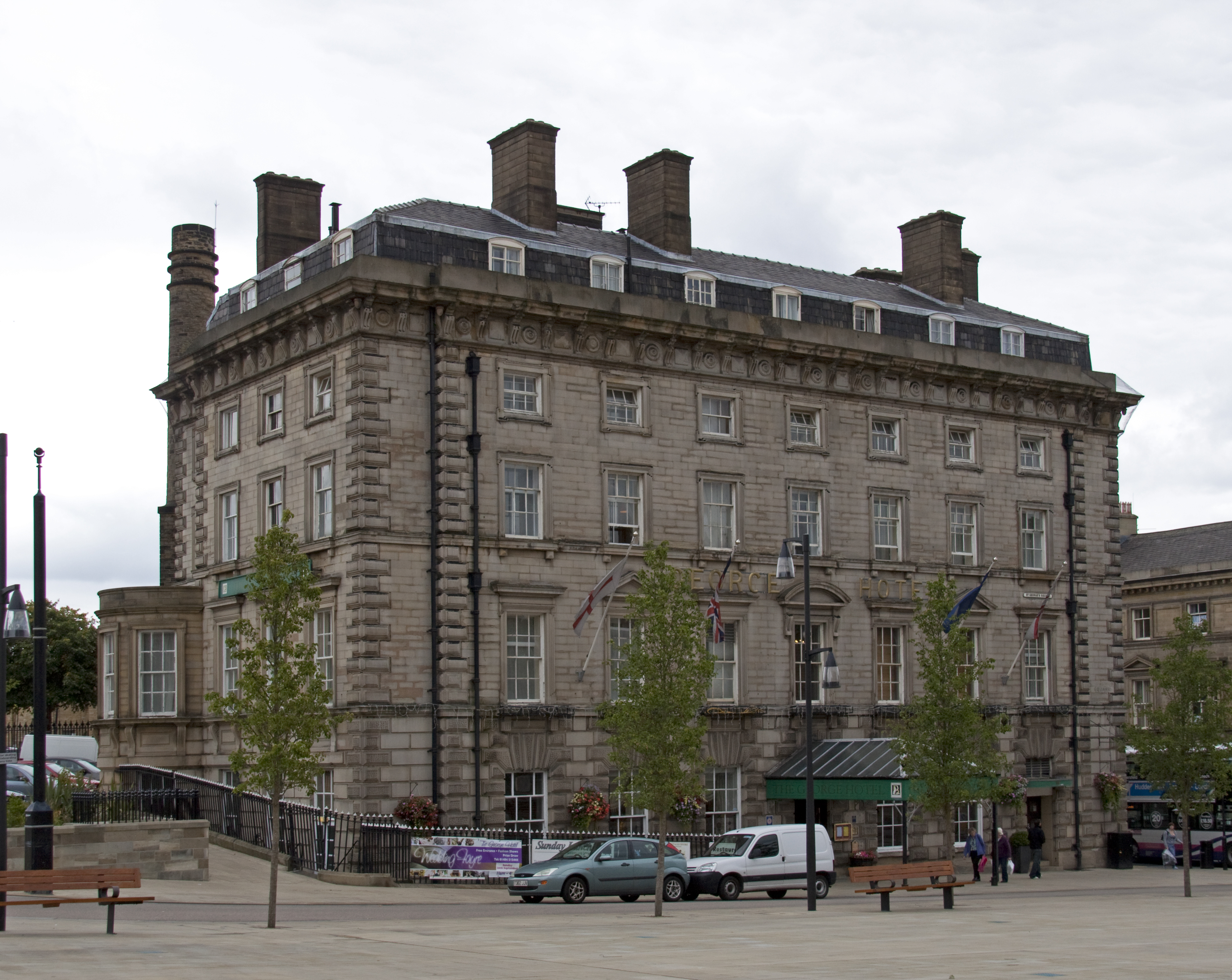
- Type: Hotel
- Location: Huddersfield, Yorkshire, England
- Coordinates: 53.6486°N 1.7834°W
- Owner: Kirklees Council

Listed Building – Grade II*
- Official name: The George Hotel including stone-flagged area and surrounding walls and railings to the south and west
- Designated: 20 September 1977
- Reference no.: 1277386

The George Hotel in Huddersfield, West Yorkshire, England, is a Grade II* listed building, designed by William Wallen, with an Italianate façade. It was built in 1848–50.

The hotel is famous as the birthplace of rugby league football in 1895. Memorabilia recalling the meeting can be found throughout the hotel as well as in the Heritage Centre.

== Description ==
The hotel is in sandstone with a rusticated ground floor, moulded quoins, moulded string courses, a moulded eaves cornice with console-shaped triglyphs, and a slate Mansard roof. There are four storeys and attics, seven bays on the front and three on the sides. The windows are sashes; on the ground floor they have vermiculated quoins and keystones, in the first floor they have moulded surrounds and full entablatures, the central window has a segmental pediment, and two outer windows have triangular pediments. The attic contains seven dormers with casements and segmental pediments. On the right return, the middle window in the first floor has a balcony with a balustrade of intersecting circles, and a badge with Saint George in relief.

== History ==
Huddersfield railway station opened in 1847 to the north of the town's established town centre. At that time much of the town was owned by the Ramsden Estate. The then head of the family owning this estate, Sir John William Ramsden, 5th Baronet, was keen to develop Huddersfield town centre, and especially the area near the station. The rather grand St George's Square in front of the station was part of this, as was the construction of the George Hotel on that square.

The Ramsden Estate had already built a hotel for the town, known as the George Inn and located on the north side of the established Market Place, in 1726 and rebuilt it in 1787. However the new St George’s Square was linked to Market Place by a newly created John William Street (named after its creator), and this required the demolition of the George Inn. As a replacement, the George Hotel was built in 1848–50 next to the station, the two buildings forming two sides of St George’s Square.

An east wing was added to the hotel on an unknown date prior to 1874, with an elevation facing John William Street and contained a large dining room on the ground floor, billiards room on the first floor, and bedrooms above. In 1874, a north-west wing was added, containing a kitchen and laundry. The glass and iron south entrance porch was added in 1926. Further extensions and interior re-modellings followed in the 1930s and 1960s.

In the meantime, the whole Ramsden Estate had been bought by Huddersfield Corporation, bringing the freehold of the hotel into council ownership. The building is still owned in this way, albeit by Kirklees Council as successor body to Huddersfield Corporation.

The building was listed at Grade II* in September 1977. The hotel closed in January 2013. In 2022, it was reported that the vacant hotel would be redeveloped at a cost of £20 million as a Radisson RED hotel, opening in 2024. In 2023, approval was given for the demolition of certain portions of the hotel as part of the redevelopment.

== The hotel and Rugby League ==
It was in the George Hotel, Huddersfield on 29 August 1895 that 21 Lancashire and Yorkshire clubs held a meeting and by a majority of 20 to 1 voted to secede from the Rugby Football Union to set up their own Northern Rugby Football Union. In 1922 this became the Rugby Football League. Stockport was also accepted into the league via telephone to the hotel.

The British Amateur Rugby League Association (BARLA) was also founded at the George Hotel in 1973.

The Rugby League Heritage Centre was located in the basement of the George from 2005 until the closure of the hotel in 2013. It was the UK's only rugby league heritage museum. It was the brainchild of sports presenter Mike Stephenson. Within the centre were displays of memorabilia, including rare jerseys, medals, caps, programmes and photographs. There was also footage played on several plasma screens. The British Rugby League Hall of Fame was also located in the Heritage Centre.

On 24 June 2020, Rugby League Cares announced a partnership with Kirklees Council to establish a National Rugby League Museum in the George Hotel.

== The hotel and popular culture ==
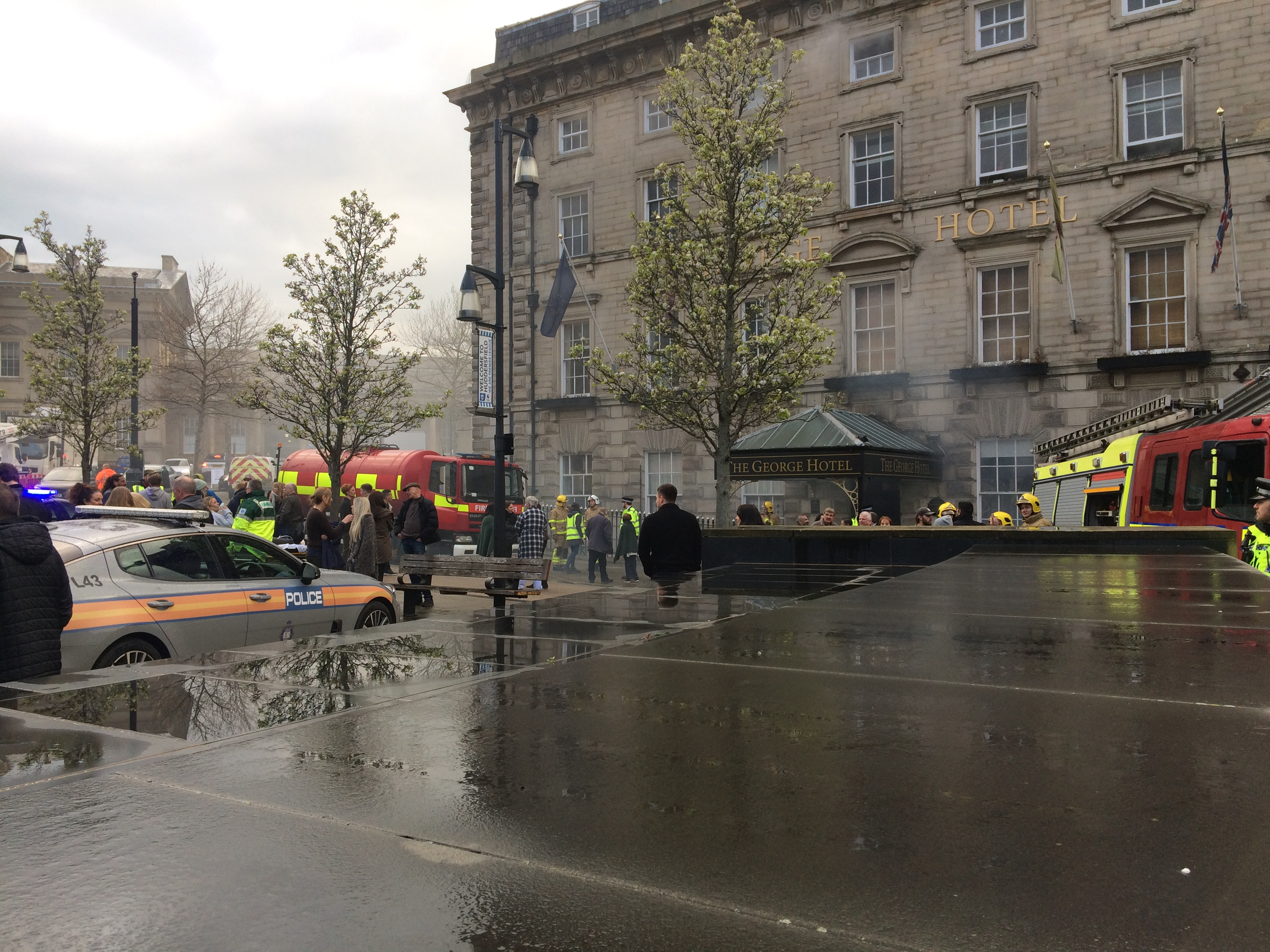
Filming at the George Hotel, Huddersfield

In the 1960s and 1970s the artist L. S. Lowry would dine in the restaurant and was known to have drawn on the napkins and given them to the dining room waiting staff.

In 2019, the George Hotel was 'set alight' by film crew for COBRA, a six part television series which aired on Sky One in 2020.

== See also ==
- Grade II* listed buildings in Kirklees
- Listed buildings in Huddersfield (Newsome Ward - central area)
