= National Rugby League Museum =

The National Rugby League Museum is a planned museum for the sport of Rugby league and is due to open in 2020. The museum will be based in the George Hotel, Huddersfield, Yorkshire, England.

== Origins ==
Following the closure of the Rugby League Heritage Centre in 2013, rugby league was left without a national museum in the United Kingdom - the country where the sport originated. The contents of the heritage centre were secured by the charity Rugby League Cares with the aid of a £97,200 grant from the Heritage Lottery Fund.

Rugby League Cares used the grant to organise a touring exhibition "Rugby League Heritage On Tour" which has shown parts of the collection at various venues across the United Kingdom since 2014.

In March 2016 Rugby League Cares announced that Kevin Moore, director of the National Football Museum would lead a feasibility study into establishing a new national museum for rugby league as well providing a home for the Rugby League Hall of Fame. The location of the museum was announced in September 2016 as Bradford City Hall, in conjunction with Bradford City Council. However, in 2020, this proposal was dropped, with instead a new plan to incorporate the museum into the disused George Hotel, Huddersfield, where the Rugby Football League was originally founded in 1895.

== Opening ==
The museum plans to open in August 2020, the 125th anniversary of the formation of the sport.
