= Castleford RFC (1896) =

Defunct English semi-professional rugby league club

Club information
- Full name: Castleford RFC
- Founded: 1896; 130 years ago
- Exited: 1907; 119 years ago

Castleford RFC was a semi-professional rugby league club based in Castleford in the West Riding of Yorkshire, England. They joined the Northern Union in 1896–97 for its second season and remained in the ranks of the (semi) professionals until the end of the 1905–06 season.

Not much is known about the original Castleford club, except that they have no connection whatsoever with the present Castleford Tigers RLFC.

== History ==
=== Early history ===
The actual date of the founding of the club is uncertain. There is definitely a Castleford Rugby Union Club in existence long before the Great Schism, and they played in the old Yorkshire Cup competition, winning "T’owd tin pot" once and finishing runners up once before 1900. They are believed to have played fixtures at the Castleford Sports Stadium.

=== Northern Union ===
As the Northern Union's second season approached, they decided to split into two regional competitions. This was partly due to the success and an increasing number of teams wishing to change codes and join and partly to cut down on the travelling costs for clubs and spectators alike. For this second season, eight new teams joined the league: Bramley, Castleford, Heckmondwike, Holbeck, Leeds Parish Church, Morecambe, Swinton, and Salford.

Castleford joined the ranks of the semi-professional rugby league clubs when they were admitted to the Yorkshire Senior Competition for the season 1896–97 and in their first season, finished in mid-table in 9th position out of 16 clubs.

1897–98 Saw them continue in the same division, finishing slightly better in what was to be their highest ever position of 6th out of 16.

The next 2 seasons, 1898–99 and 1899–1900, saw them slip to 11th and 12th places respectively (out of 16 clubs).

Their fifth season 1900–01 and the start of the new millennium saw them slip back to second bottom (of the 16 clubs. But things were different in the end of season Challenge Cup competition, where, on 13 April 1901 on a neutral ground, Castleford reached the semi-final stage where they lost to Warrington by 21–5.

At the end of the season the top seven sides from both the Lancashire and the Yorkshire Senior in the 1900–01 competitions of the NRFU, resigned and merged into a new league for 1901–02. In doing so they formed the Northern Rugby League and with that the name "rugby league" was officially used for the first time. The remaining clubs together with several additions from the lower leagues continued in the Lancashire and Yorkshire Senior Leagues.

The new clubs were Altrincham, Birkenhead Wanderers, Lancaster, Morecambe and Radcliffe joined the Lancashire ranks, and Dewsbury, Goole, Heckmondwike, Keighley, Normanton, Sowerby Bridge and York joined the Yorkshire side (with Leeds Parish Church folding).

This season 1901–02 in what was effectively Division 2 (East), Castleford finished mid-table 9th out of the 14 clubs.

At the end of the 1901–02 season, the County Leagues elected 18 teams to join the new Division 2 (7 from Lancashire and 10 from Yorkshire and a new member from South Shields) with the existing second competition scrapped.

In season 1902–03 Castleford joined the new 2nd Division, where they would stay for the next three seasons. In the first season in the new second division (1902–03) Castleford finished 15th out of the 18 clubs.

In the next two seasons 1903–04 and 1904–05 Castleford improved slightly finishing 7th (out of 19) and 9th (out of 14) respectively.

In 1905–06 the Rugby League combined the divisions to form one united league. In this, Castleford's final season in the semi-professional ranks, they finished 28th out of the 31 clubs. Castleford dropped out of the league at the end of the season.

==== The end ====
At this time several of the clubs were struggling financially, Castleford's near neighbours Normanton cancelled their final game against Millom, both clubs cited the costs of travel, and both clubs folded at the end of this season.

A new Northern Union club was formed in late December 1909, from a meeting held at the Garden House Hotel. They decided to enter the Yorkshire Junior NU Cup and commenced with an ordinary engagement with York on 1 January 1910 which resulted in a 22–5 defeat. The Yorkshire Junior NU Cup tie against Knottingley was won 39–0. However, the RL ordered a replay due to Castleford fielding ineligible players. This team disbanded in September 1910 due to the difficulty in signing players.

The formation of a further Castleford club commenced in July 1912. It had its headquarters at the George and Dragon Hotel, Bridge Foot, and a playing area behind the Aire and Calder Hotel, off Wheldon Road. The team was entered into two leagues, these being the Leeds & District and the Dewsbury & Wakefield. Their opening game was on 7 September 1912 against Outwood Church.

There are very few mentions of Castleford after their dropping out of the semi-professional leagues. One item of note, in the 1913–14 season, on Saturday 28 February in the Challenge Cup 1st Round, Wigan travelled to a Castleford team and beat them 27–8.

==== Successor club ====
The successor team (who became Castleford Tigers) joined the league for the 1926–27 season. Many official records state that they were founded at this time (June 1926), but they had played successfully in the lower Yorkshire County leagues for several years before this date. They actually joined the League "code" around 1920 and played in these early years at the Sandy Desert ground. They have no connection with this; the earlier team is of the same name.

=== Players of note ===
- Thomas Bryan (VC) (21 Jan 1882 - 13 Oct 1945)
- Isaac Cole (9 Apr 1886 – 30 Mar 1940) won a rugby league cap for England while at Castleford in 1906 against Other Nationalities

== Seasons ==
Season	League											Challenge Cup	Yorkshire Cup	Notes	Ref
Season	Division	Pl	W	D	L	PF	PA	Diff	Pts	%	Pos	Challenge Cup	Yorkshire Cup	Notes	Ref
1896–97	Yorks Sen Comp	30	11	6	13	178	161	17	28		9/16	R2	—N/a		
1897–98	Yorks Sen Comp	30	16	1	13	256	208	48	33		6/16	R3	—N/a		
1898–99	Yorks Sen Comp	30	10	4	16	159	214	−55	24		12/16	R3	—N/a		
1899–1900	Yorks Sen Comp	30	11	3	16	155	199	−44	25		11/16	R1	—N/a		
1900–01	Yorks Sen Comp	30	5	4	21	92	331	−239	14		15/16	Semi-final	—N/a		
1901–02	Yorks Sen Comp	26	9	3	14	115	163	-48	21		10/14	R4	—N/a		
1902–03	2nd Division	34	9	4	21	105	268	−163	22		15/18	R2	—N/a		
1903–04	2nd Division	32	18	3	11	185	194	−9	39		7/17	R1	—N/a		
1904–05	2nd Division	26	9	3	14	104	199	−95	21		9/14	R1	—N/a		
1905–06	Championship	20	3	2	15	45	325	−280	8	20	28/31	QR	R1		

Heading Abbreviations
Pl = Games played; W = Win; D = Draw; L = Lose; PF = Points for; PA = Points against; Diff = Points difference (+ or -); Pts = League Points
League points: for win = 2; for draw = 1; for loss = 0.

== Several fixtures and results ==
The following are just some of Castleford's fixtures for the eight seasons in which they played semi-professional rugby league :-

Season	Date	Competition	Opponent	Venue	H/A	Result	Score	Att	Notes	Ref
1896–97	Sat 1896-12-12	YSC	Hull	Boulevard	A	Draw	0–0			
1896–97	Sat 1897-03-13	YSC	Hull	H	H	Draw	8–8			
1896–97	Sat 1897-03-27	CCR2	St. Helens	A	A	Lost	3–17			
1897–98	Sat 1897-12-04	YSC	Hull	H	H	Draw	8–8			
1897–98	Sat 1898-02-26	CC R1	Wigan	H	H	Won	18–2			
1897–98	Sat 1898-04-02	YSC	Hull	Boulevard	A	Lost	0–8			
1898–99	Sat 1898-10-22	YSC	Hull	H	H	Lost	8–21			
1898–99	Sat 1899-01-28	YSC	Hull	Boulevard	A	Lost	0–21			
1899–1900	Sat 1899-11-11	YSC	Hull	Boulevard	A	Lost	0–20			
1899–1900	Sat 1900-02-17	YSC	Hull	H	H	Lost	0–8			
1900–01	Sat 1900-11-24	YSC	Hull	H	H	Won	6–3			
1900–01	Sat 1901-03-16	YSC	Hull	Boulevard	A	Lost	4–16			
1900–01	Sat 1901-04-13	CC SF	Warrington	Broughton	N	Lost	5–21		1	
1901–02	Sat 1902-03-22	CC R2	Wigan	H	H	Won	16–0			
1903–04	Sat 1903-12-12	RL	St. Helens	Knowsley Rd	A	Won	7–0			
1903–04	Sat 1904-09-04	RL	St. Helens	A	H	Lost	3–31			

Heading Abbreviations

CC Rx = Challenge Cup Round x; LC Rx = Lancashire Cup Competition; RL = Combined League: YSC = Yorkshire Senior Competition:

== Notable players ==
Foster of Castleford played in The Rest's 5–7 defeat by Leeds in the 1901–02 Yorkshire Senior Competition Champions versus The Rest match at Headingley Stadium on Saturday 19 April 1902.

- Harry Speed
- Issac Cole

== See also ==
- List of defunct rugby league clubs
- Castleford Sports
