= Normanton R.L.F.C. =

English amateur rugby league club, in Wakefield, West Yorkshire

Normanton
Club information
- Full name: Normanton Rugby League Football Club
- Colours: Red and black
- Founded: 1879; 147 years ago
- Exited: 1906

Former details
- Ground: Queen Elizabeth Drive Normanton West Yorkshire WF6 1DT
- Chairman: Joan Langley
- Coach: Johnny Kirk

Normanton was a rugby league club based in Normanton, a small town within the City of Wakefield in West Yorkshire, England.

The club joined the Northern Union in 1898–99 and played for a total of five seasons until 1905–06. They played at the Mopsey Garth ground.

== History ==
The first rugby club in Normanton was established in 1879 and used the Midland Hotel as its base.

Together with 14 other clubs including Hull Kingston Rovers and Keighley, Normanton were one of the founders of the third division of the Yorkshire Senior Competition, then known as the Yorkshire Rugby Union Intermediate Competition, in 1893.

After the Great Schism in 1895, Normanton remained true to the Rugby Football Union. until eventually following the majority of other Yorkshire clubs and joining the Northern Union in 1898. They, together with Eastmoor, Featherstone Rovers, Goole, Hull Kingston Rovers, Kinsley, Outwood Parish Church, Ripon, Rothwell and York, were among the founders of the Yorkshire Second Competition (Eastern Section).

In season 1899–1900 Normanton finished top of this league, and on the way beat Leeds in the first round of the Challenge Cup before losing to Batley in the second round.

In 1901–02 Normanton were elected into the Yorkshire Senior Competition where they finished a creditable 8th, one place above local rivals Castleford out of 14.

At the end of the 1901–02 season, the County Leagues elected 18 teams to join the new Division 2 (7 from Lancashire and 10 from Yorkshire and new member South Shields) with the existing second competition scrapped.

1901–02 Normanton, being one of the fortunate ones, joined the new second division and finished 12th out of 18 teams. In 1903–04 Normanton continued to play in the Second division, but struggled and finished in 17th and bottom place. The 1904–05 season was a little better and Normanton managed to finish 10th out of 14; one place below Castleford.

1905–06 saw the Rugby League revert to one single division of 31 clubs. Normanton finished in 26th position but in doing so ended the season in financial difficulties. The Northern Union allowed Millom and Normanton to cancel their game due to the cost of travelling. At the end of the season Normanton was forced to fold. (Millom, who finished one position below Normanton in 27th place also folded at the end of the season due to financial difficulties).

A new club, named Hopetown F.C., was formed shortly after Normanton folded, which continued to compete at amateur level, eventually becoming the present-day Normanton Knights.

== Club league record ==
The league positions for Normanton for the five years in which they played semi-professional rugby league are given in the following table :-

Season	Competition	Pos	Team Name	Pl	W	D	L	PW	PA	Diff	Pts	% Pts	No of teams in league	Notes	Ref
1901–02	Yorks Senior	8	Normanton								28		14		
			Only limited County League information is available for this season.												
1902–03	2nd Division	12	Normanton	34	12	4	18	160	228	-68	28		16		
1903–04	2nd Division	17	Normanton	32	4	0	28	105	411	-306	8		17		
1904–05	2nd Division	10	Normanton	26	9	1	16	105	228	-123	19		14		
1905–06	RL	24	Normanton	24	4	2	18	50	280	-230	10	20.83	31		

Heading Abbreviations
RL = Single Division; Pl = Games played; W = Win; D = Draw; L = Lose; PF = Points for; PA = Points against; Diff = Points difference (+ or -); Pts = League points
% Pts = A percentage system was used to determine league positions due to clubs playing varying number of fixtures and against different opponents
League points: for win = 2; for draw = 1; for loss = 0.

== Several fixtures and results ==
The following are just a few of Normanton’s fixtures during the five season (and other times) in which they played semi-professional rugby league :-

Season	Date	Competition	Opponent	Venue	H/A	Result	Score	Att	Notes	Ref
1897–98	Sat 3 Sep 1898	Yorks Sec Comp (East)	Dewsbury	Mopsey Garth	H	Won	16-3	?	1	
1899–1900	date unknown	CC R1	Leeds	venue unknown		Won		?		
1899–1900	date unknown	CC R2	Batley	venue unknown		Lost		?		
1903–04	Sat 3 Oct 1903	2nd Div	St. Helens	Knowsley Rd	A	Lost	0-27	?		
1903–04	Sat 30 Jan 1904	2nd Div	St. Helens	Mopsey Garth	H	Lost	6-8	?		
1905–06	Sat 20 Jan 1906	RL	St. Helens	Knowsley Rd	A	Lost	3-28	?		
1905–06	Sat 31 Mar 1906	RL	St. Helens	Mopsey Garth	H	Lost	5–9	?		
1908–09	Sat 27 Feb 1909	Challenge Cup 1st Rd	Hull	Home	H	Lost	10-20	?		
1911-12	17 Feb 1912	Challenge Cup 1st Rd	Warrington	Home	H	Drew	6-6	?		
1911-12	19 Feb 1912	CC 1st Round replay	Warrington	Wilderspool	A	Lost	0-75	?		

== Notes and comments ==
1 - This was one of the games played on the Inaugural Saturday of the new league

== Notable players ==
Voyce of Normanton played in The Rest's 5-7 defeat by Leeds in the 1901–02 Yorkshire Senior Competition Champions versus The Rest match at Headingley Stadium on Saturday 19 April 1902.

== See also ==
- List of defunct rugby league clubs
