= 1895–96 Rugby Union County Championship =

English rugby union competition

1895–96 County Championship
- Countries: England
- Champions: Yorkshire (7th title)
- Runners-up: Surrey

The 1895–96 Rugby Union County Championship was the eighth edition of England's premier rugby union club competition at that time. The competition was reorganised with a reduction of groups from four to three, and the winners of the south-east and south-west groups competed in a play-off for the right to play the northern group winners in the final. This was the third format of the competition.

Yorkshire won the competition for the seventh time, defeating Surrey in the final.

== Group stage ==
=== Northern group ===
Northern group	P	W	D	L	Pts
Yorkshire	6	6	0	0	12
Lancashire	6	5	0	1	10
Cumberland	6	3	1	2	7
Durham	6	3	1	2	7
Northumberland	6	2	0	4	4
Westmorland	6	1	0	5	2
Cheshire	6	0	0	6	0

16 November 1895

Lancashire	7–5	Cumberland

16 November 1895

Yorkshire	11–0	Northumberland

=== South-eastern group ===
South-eastern group	P	W	D	L	F	A	Pts
Surrey	4	3	1	0	46	12	7
Midland Counties	4	2	1	1	40	22	5
Kent	3	1	0	2	14	36	2
Middlesex	3	0	0	3	13	43	0

=== South-western group ===
South-western group	P	W	D	L	F	A	Pts
Devon	3	3	0	0	43	8	6
Somerset	3	2	0	1	28	6	4
Gloucestershire	3	1	0	2	18	41	2
Cornwall	3	0	0	3	3	37	0

16 November 1895

Devon	22–3	Cornwall
		Pen: Salter

Plymouth

30 November 1895

Devon	3 goals, 1 try – 1 goal	Gloucestershire

30 November 1895

Somerset	5–0	Cornwall

Wellington

14 December 1895

Cornwall	0–10	Gloucestershire

Falmouth

== Southern Play Off match ==
Date	Venue	Team One	Team Two	Score
30 Jan	Richmond	Surrey	Devon	16-0

== Final ==
20 February 1896

Surrey	4–16	Yorkshire
Drop: Ashford		Try: Barron, Mosley, Murgatroyd, Couley; Con: Duke (2)

Athletic Ground, Richmond
Referee: A J Davies (Glamorgan)

K B Alexander	Guy's Hospital
Clifford Wells	Harlequins
H N Clarke	Harlequins & Guy's Hospital
William Henry Thorman	Richmond
H T Wallis	Cambridge University & Blackheath
Cyril Wells	Harlequins
J H Curtis	RIE College
S B Peech (capt)	Harlequins
William Ashford	Richmond
H W Dudgeon	Richmond
J H Kipling	Thornton Heath
D H Helps	Croydon
Frederick Lohden	Blackheath
R W Hunt	Harlequins
F H Todd	RIE College

C E Dixon	Alverthorpe
Ernest Fookes	Sowerby Bridge
S Murritt	Kingston Rovers
W Murgatroyd	Idle
A Hambrecht	Bramley
Harry Myers	Bramley
George Mosley	Leeds Parish Church
Tom Broadley (capt)	Bingley
Jack Rhodes	Castleford
Anthony Starks	Castleford
Harry Speed	Castleford
J W Ward	Castleford
J Conley	Leeds Parish Church
W Duke	Holbeck
H E Barrington	Bingley

== See also ==
- English rugby union system
- Rugby union in England
