= 1904–05 Northern Rugby Football Union season =

- League: Championship
- Teams: First Division: 18; Second Division: 14

First Division
- Champions: Oldham (1st title)
- Runners-up: Bradford F.C.
- Top point-scorer: (England) James Lomas (Salford) (146)
- Top try-scorer: James Dechan (Bradford F.C.) (31)

Second Division
- Champions: Dewsbury
- Resigned from the League: Birkenhead; Holbeck; South Shields; Lancaster

The 1904–05 Northern Rugby Football Union season was the tenth season of rugby league football.

== Season summary ==
Oldham won their first Championship whilst Warrington won the Challenge Cup.

Holbeck and South Shields dropped out, reducing the competition to 15 teams.

Birkenhead resigned after 4 games, the results of which were struck out of the table. They lost all four games, conceding 93 points and scoring none.

On 4 March 1905, a record 11 tries were scored by George West (Hull Kingston Rovers) v Brookland Rovers in the Northern Union Challenge Cup. In this same match the record for most points in a match, 53 (11t, 10g) by George West (Hull Kingston Rovers) was recorded.

There was no county league competition this season.

At the end of the season, all First Division and Second Division clubs, except Lancaster, were elected to the new single top division, the NRFU Championship.

== Notable events ==
- At the start of this season, the Northern Union changed its rules to allow clubs to have full-time players paid by the clubs, thus making it fully professional.

== Tables ==
=== First Division ===
Pos	Team	Pld	W	D	L	PF	PA	PAv	Pts
1	Oldham (C)	34	25	1	8	291	158	1.842	51
2	Bradford	34	23	2	9	294	156	1.885	48
3	Broughton Rangers	34	22	2	10	295	175	1.686	46
4	Leeds	34	20	4	10	232	150	1.547	44
5	Warrington	34	20	2	12	220	150	1.467	42
6	Salford	34	19	2	13	276	204	1.353	40
7	Wigan	34	18	1	15	230	195	1.179	37
8	Hull F.C.	34	15	4	15	224	214	1.047	34
9	Hunslet	34	16	1	17	240	216	1.111	33
10	Halifax	34	15	2	17	204	155	1.316	32
11	Leigh	34	14	3	17	165	209	0.789	31
12	Hull Kingston Rovers	34	15	0	19	200	220	0.909	30
13	Swinton	34	13	2	19	155	196	0.791	28
14	Wakefield Trinity	34	13	2	19	154	211	0.730	28
15	Batley	34	12	3	19	160	228	0.702	27
16	Widnes	34	13	1	20	128	280	0.457	27
17	St. Helens	34	9	1	24	168	351	0.479	19
18	Runcorn	34	7	1	26	133	301	0.442	15

Updated to match(es) played on unknown. Source:
Rules for classification: 1) Points; 2) Points difference; 3) Points scored
(C) Champions

=== Second Division ===
Pos	Team	Pld	W	D	L	PF	PA	PAv	Pts	Qualification
1	Dewsbury (C, P)	26	22	2	2	247	48	5.146	46	Promotion to First Division
2	Barrow (P)	26	22	0	4	286	68	4.206	44	Promotion to First Division
3	York (P)	26	18	3	5	205	76	2.697	39	Promotion to First Division
4	Keighley (P)	26	15	2	9	259	94	2.755	32	Promotion to First Division
5	Huddersfield (P)	26	14	2	10	231	143	1.615	30	Promotion to First Division
6	Rochdale Hornets (P)	26	11	4	11	154	145	1.062	26	Promotion to First Division
7	Millom (P)	26	12	0	14	139	173	0.803	24	Promotion to First Division
8	Pontefract (P)	26	10	1	15	156	175	0.891	21	Promotion to First Division
9	Castleford (P)	26	9	3	14	104	199	0.523	21	Promotion to First Division
10	Normanton (P)	26	9	1	16	105	228	0.461	19	Promotion to First Division
11	Brighouse Rangers (P)	26	8	1	17	111	169	0.657	17	Promotion to First Division
12	Lancaster	26	8	1	17	106	257	0.412	17	Resigned from league
13	Morecambe (P)	26	7	2	17	88	272	0.324	16	Promotion to First Division
14	Bramley (P)	26	5	2	19	95	239	0.397	12	Promotion to First Division

Updated to match(es) played on unknown. Source:
Rules for classification: 1) Points; 2) Points difference; 3) Points scored
(C) Champions; (P) Promoted

== Challenge Cup ==
Warrington beat Hull Kingston Rovers 6–0 in the final at Leeds before a crowd of 19,638 to win the Cup at their third attempt in a final.
