= Altrincham (rugby league) =

Defunct English semi-professional rugby league club

Altrincham RFC
Club information
- Full name: Altrincham RFC
- Founded: 1876; 149 years ago
- Exited: 1902; 123 years ago

Former details
- Ground(s): Stamford Road

Uniforms
Home colours

Altrincham was a semi-professional rugby league club based in Altrincham, Cheshire, England.

They joined the Northern Union in 1901–02 and played for the single season in the Lancashire Senior Competition, which was effectively Division 2 (West). Although they were from Cheshire, they, like several other Cheshire clubs and some Cumberland clubs, participated in the Lancashire Competitions.

== History ==
The club was active by the 1876–77 season, and joined the ranks of the semi-professionals when becoming a member of the Northern Union for the 1901–02 season finishing in 12th position out of 13 clubs (with an unenviable record of only one win and one draw).

At the end of the 1901–02 season, the County Leagues elected 18 teams to join the new Division 2 (7 from Lancashire and 10 from Yorkshire and new member South Shields) with the existing second competition scrapped.

Altrincham were one of the 4 Yorkshire (Goole, Heckmondwike, Liversedge and Sowerby Bridge) and 2 Lancashire clubs (the other being Radcliffe) not elected to the new Division 2, but it is unknown as to which route the club followed.

== Colours ==
The club wore red jerseys, white "nickers", and red stockings.

== Ground ==
The club played at the "splendid" ground of Stamford Park.

== Club League Record ==
The record of Altrincham's sole season in the professional ranks is as follows:-

Season	Competition	Pos	Team Name	Pl	W	D	L	PF	PA	Diff	Pts	PAv	No of teams in league	Notes	Ref
1901–02	Lancs Senior	12	Altrincham	24	2	1	21	20	428	-408	3	0.047	13		
Altrincham had 2 points deducted.

Heading Abbreviations
RL = Single division; Pl = Games played; W = Win; D = Draw; L = Lose; PF = Points for; PA = Points against; Diff = Points difference (+ or -); Pts = League points
PAv = The points average was used to determine position in the case of equal league points. It is the ratio of points score to points conceded.
League points: for win = 2; for draw = 1; for loss = 0.

== Several fixtures & results ==
The following are just a few of Altrincham's fixtures during the sole season in which they played semi-professional rugby league:

Season	Date	Competition	Opponent	Venue	H/A	Result	Score	Att	Ref
1901–02	28 Sept 1901	Lancs Senior	Widnes	Lowerhouse Lane	A	Lost	0–28	?	
1901–02	Sat 2 Nov 1901	Lancs Senior	Wigan	Home	H	Lost	2–28	?	
1901–02	16 Nov 1901	Lancs Senior	Widnes	Home	H	Lost	0–16	?	
1901–02	Sat 14 Dec 1901	Lancs Senior	Wigan	Springfield Park	A	Lost	0–38	?	
1901–02	Sat 4 Jan 1902	Lancs Senior	St. Helens	Home	H	Lost	0–11	?	
1901–02	Sat 14 Dec 1901	Lancs Senior	St. Helens	Knowsley Rd	A	Lost	0–35	?	

== See also ==
- List of defunct rugby league clubs
