= Joe Riley (rugby) =

GB & England international rugby league footballer

Personal information
- Full name: Joe Riley Gledhill
- Born: 16 June 1882; Sowerby Bridge, England
- Died: 28 February 1950 (aged 67); Halifax, England

Playing information
- Height: 5 ft 9.5 in (1.765 m)
- Weight: 13 st 10 lb (87 kg)
- Position: Centre, Stand-off, Scrum-half
Club
Years	Team	Pld	T	G	FG	P
1899–01	Sowerby Bridge
1901–15	Halifax	419	117	23	0	397
	Total	419	117	23	0	397
Representative
Years	Team	Pld	T	G	FG	P
	Yorkshire	6
1910–11	England	2	1	0	0	3
1910	Great Britain	1	1	0	0	3

Coaching information
Club
Years	Team	Gms	W	D	L	W%
1919–≥19	Halifax RUFC

Joe Riley Gledhill (16 June 1882 – 28 February 1950) was an English professional rugby league footballer who played in the 1890s, 1900s and 1910s, and coached rugby union in the 1910s and 1920s. He played representative level rugby league (RL) for Great Britain, England and Yorkshire, and at club level for Sowerby Bridge and Halifax, as a centre, stand-off or scrum-half, and coached rugby union (RU) at the newly established Halifax RUFC (formed 1919), with fellow Halifax Hall Of Fame Inductee; Archie Rigg, after both of their playing careers finished.

== Background ==
Riley was born on 16 June 1882 in Sowerby Bridge, West Riding of Yorkshire. For most of his non-rugby life, he worked for Smith, Bulmer & Co., a textile business based in Holmfield. Riley died on 28 February 1950, aged 67. His funeral took place at Sowerby Bridge cemetery.

== Playing career ==
=== International honours ===
Riley won caps for England while at Halifax in 1910 against Wales, in 1911 against Australia, and won caps for Great Britain while at Halifax on the 1910 Great Britain Lions tour of Australia and New Zealand against Australia and Australasia.

=== County Honours ===
Riley won caps for Yorkshire while at Halifax.

=== Challenge Cup Final appearances ===
Joe Riley played scrum-half in Halifax's 7-0 victory over Salford in the 1902–03 Challenge Cup Final during the 1902–03 season at Headingley, Leeds on Saturday 25 April 1903, in front of a crowd of 32,507, and he played at centre, and scored a try in the 8-3 victory over Warrington in the 1903–04 Challenge Cup Final during the 1903–04 season at The Willows, Salford on Saturday 30 April 1904, in front of a crowd of 17,041.

=== Club career ===
Riley made his début for Halifax on Saturday 7 September 1901, he suffered a badly broken leg in the match against Bradford Northern on Saturday 2 January 1915, this fracture ended his rugby league playing career.

=== Testimonial match ===
A testimonial match at Halifax was shared by Joe Riley, and Asa Robinson at Thrum Hall, Halifax in 1920. 20,000 people attended the match, and Riley received a cheque for £400.

== Honoured at Halifax ==
Riley is a Halifax Hall of Fame inductee.
