= 1901–02 Northern Rugby Football Union season =

- League: Championship
- Duration: 26 Rounds
- Teams: 14

1901–02 Season
- Champions: Broughton Rangers (1st title)
- Runners-up: Salford
- Top point-scorer: (England) James Lomas (Salford) (172)
- Top try-scorer: (England) Robert Wilson (Broughton Rangers) (38)

Lancashire Senior Competition
- Champions: Wigan
- Runners-up: Widnes

Yorkshire Senior Competition
- Champions: Leeds
- Runners-up: Manningham

The 1901–02 Northern Rugby Football Union season was the seventh season of rugby league football run by England's Northern Rugby Football Union. A number of off-season changes made this season different from preceding ones. In June 1901 fourteen leading clubs from both Lancashire and Yorkshire resigned from their respective County Championships to form a new Northern Rugby Football League.

== Creation of National Championship ==
At the end of May 12 clubs met to discuss a new Northern Union League, the 12 clubs were Broughton Rangers, Oldham, Runcorn, Salford, Swinton and Warrington from Lancashire together with Bradford, Batley, Halifax, Huddersfield, Hull and Hunslet from Yorkshire. The Northern Union committee narrowly approved the formation of the new league by 12 votes to 11 at its meeting on 4 June and invited Leigh (Lancashire) and Brighouse Rangers (Yorkshire) to join the new league. There was a lot of acrimony about the decision and some cynicism expressed that Leigh and Brighouse had only been invited to ensure that the vote to approve the new league passed. The meeting also agreed that the name of the new league would be the Northern Rugby Football League. The clubs involved justified their action on the basis that games in the senior competitions were uncompetitive and the ability gap between top and bottom was too great.

The Yorkshire clubs who were not included in the new league were unhappy with the whole issue and at a meeting of the Yorkshire Senior Competition on 20 June, the Yorkshire clubs voted to boycott the Northern Rugby League and would not play any games against League clubs. In retaliation to the Yorkshire boycott the Northern Rugby Football League by-laws regarding transfers and promotion were changed to omit any mention of Yorkshire. This had the effect of a) making it permissible for Northern Rugby Football League clubs to sign players of Yorkshire clubs without the Yorkshire clubs' permission (and vice versa) and b) promotion to the Northern Rugby Football League would only be open to the club winning the Lancashire Senior Competition; previously promotion was going to be given to the winners of a match between the Yorkshire Senior Competition and Lancashire Senior Competition champions.

=== Effects on the senior competitions ===
Hull Kingston Rovers felt unable to comply with the Yorkshire Senior Competition boycott and at the end of July the club was expelled from the Yorkshire Senior Competition. Not having been invited to join the Northern Rugby Football League but still wishing to seek admission to the Northern Rugby Football League, Hull Kingston Rovers applied for membership of the Lancashire Senior Competition and were accepted in August.

The expulsion of Hull Kingston Rovers left the Yorkshire Senior Competition with only seven clubs and this was reduced to six when Leeds Parish Church resigned from the competition after the club had to leave their Clarence Road ground. To bring the numbers in the competition back up to 14, seven clubs were promoted from the Yorkshire No.2 competition; these clubs being Dewsbury, Goole, Heckmondwike, Keighley, Normanton, Sowerby Bridge and York.

The Lancashire Senior Competition also promoted a number of teams from the second competition by adding Altrincham, Birkenhead Wanderers, Lancaster, Morecambe and Radcliffe; originally Tyldesley were offered one of the places but the offer was withdrawn and the place given to Radcliffe instead.

To increase the number of games 12 of the Lancashire based clubs, including both Northern Rugby Football League & Lancashire Senior Competition teams, formed two additional leagues, the South East and South West Lancashire Leagues. Where clubs played either a Northern Rugby Football League or Lancashire Senior Competition game and the teams were in the same Lancashire League then the result of the game counted for both competitions.

In September 1901 the Athletic News reported on a number of players who comprised what the paper called "the rival poaching" i.e. players who had moved from Yorkshire Senior Competition to Northern Rugby Football League clubs and vice versa due to the lack of agreement between the two competitions. Among these was James Lomas who joined Salford from Bramley and was subsequently the subject of the first three figure transfer fee when a tribunal assessed his value at £100.

=== Developments 1901–1902 ===
In early December 1901 representatives of the Northern Rugby Football League and Yorkshire Senior Competition met to see if the differences between them could be reconciled. No progress could be made as the Yorkshire Senior Competition was still advocating the abolition of the Northern Rugby Football League and the only compromise the Northern Rugby Football League was prepared to make was expanding the number of clubs in the Northern Rugby Football League to 15 and for a single club to be relegated each season.

There was no further contact until April 1902 when the Northern Rugby Football League and Yorkshire Senior Competition met again, this time the Yorkshire Senior Competition proposed to lift its boycott of the Northern Rugby Football League, that transfer agreements the same as those between the Lancashire Senior Competition and the Northern Rugby Football League be adopted and finally that the Yorkshire Senior Competition would accept promotion between the Yorkshire Senior Competition and the Northern Rugby Football League save that the club eligible for promotion could decline it if they so wished. The Northern Rugby Football League representatives met with the Lancashire Senior Competition a few days later. The Lancashire Senior Competition were concerned that if the Yorkshire proposals were accepted the Lancashire Senior Competition would be untenable due to a lack of clubs for a representative fixture list. The Lancashire Senior Competition and the Northern Rugby Football League therefore came up with a counter-proposal; that a second division of the Northern Rugby Football League be created, that all eligible teams be invited to join the second division and that promotion to the Northern Rugby Football League first division would only be from the second division. A further meeting between the Northern Rugby Football League and the Yorkshire Senior Competition took place on 28 April at which the parties agreed that the Yorkshire Senior Competition boycott of the Northern Rugby Football League would be ended and an independent panel was established who would rule of transfer fees between clubs. The two sides were unable to agree on the establishment of a second division to the Northern Rugby Football League. The Northern Rugby Football League reiterated that they would establish a second division but noted the position of the Yorkshire Senior Competition that a second division was not in the best interests of the Yorkshire teams.

Three weeks later, splits started to appear in the Yorkshire Senior Competition. On 20 May it was announced that Leeds had applied to join the Northern Rugby Football League having been informed that an application at this stage was likely to be accepted; and before the end of the month similar applications had been made by York and Wakefield Trinity. At the Northern Rugby Football League meeting on 17 June 1902 no fewer than 11 Yorkshire clubs applied to join the Northern Rugby Football League and all 11 applications were agreed. Ten Lancashire clubs also applied to join the Northern Rugby Football League and nine were accepted (Radcliffe's application was refused); also accepted was the first club from the north-east, South Shields.

These additions to the Northern Rugby Football League made the number of competing clubs 36. Brighouse, who finished bottom of the Northern Rugby Football League were re-elected to the league and Wigan, winners of the Lancashire Senior Competition were elected to the league making 15 teams in the first division. It was proposed that all 36 clubs vote on which three teams to promote immediately from the second division with the remaining 18 making up the second division for the next season. The ballot was conducted on 1 July 1902 with Hull Kingston Rovers, St Helens and Widnes being elected. With most of the senior clubs from both county competitions now being in the Northern Rugby Football League the committees in both counties took stock; on 29 July the Lancashire Senior Competition committee voted to wind up the competition with the trophy being donated to the Northern Rugby Football League as a trophy for the second division. In Yorkshire it was decided to continue the competition but as a junior league only.

== Season summary ==
Broughton Rangers were the first winners of the Northern Rugby Football League; the Lancashire Senior Competition was won by Wigan and the Yorkshire Senior Competition by Leeds.

James Lomas was the league's top scorer scoring 172 points (22 tries and 53 goals), a new record points total; Robert Wilson of Broughton Rangers was the leading try-scorer scoring 38 tries. W James also of Broughton Rangers set a new goal kicking record scoring 75 during the season. Salford moved to their new ground, The Willows during the season; their first game at the new venue was a 2–0 win against Swinton in front of a crowd of 16,981 on 21 December 1901.

In all three competitions clubs suffered points deductions for various breaches of the rules, Hunslet and Swinton each being penalised twice.

Rochdale Hornets fell into financial difficulties due to falling gates which the club, as members of the Lancashire Senior Competition, blamed on the formation of the NRFL. The players agreed to play some games without pay and the club members paid further subscriptions to resolve the difficulties.

== Standings ==
=== Championship ===
| | Team | Pld | W | D | L | PF | PA | Pts |
|---|---|---|---|---|---|---|---|---|
| 1 | Broughton Rangers | 26 | 21 | 1 | 4 | 285 | 112 | 43 |
| 2 | Salford | 26 | 15 | 3 | 8 | 235 | 125 | 31 (Note: Club deducted two points for breaches of the competition rules) |
| 3 | Runcorn | 26 | 15 | 2 | 9 | 185 | 101 | 30 |
| 4 | Swinton | 26 | 16 | 0 | 10 | 226 | 121 | 28 (Note: Club deducted four points for breaches of the operational rules) |
| 5 | Halifax | 26 | 12 | 4 | 10 | 142 | 165 | 28 |
| 6 | Bradford | 26 | 14 | 1 | 11 | 201 | 157 | 27 |
| 7 | Warrington | 26 | 14 | 0 | 12 | 162 | 150 | 26 |
| 8 | Hull | 26 | 11 | 2 | 13 | 166 | 193 | 24 |
| 9 | Oldham | 26 | 10 | 2 | 14 | 190 | 169 | 22 |
| 10 | Leigh | 26 | 11 | 0 | 15 | 158 | 162 | 22 |
| 11 | Hunslet | 26 | 13 | 0 | 13 | 164 | 207 | 22 |
| 12 | Batley | 26 | 8 | 4 | 14 | 136 | 198 | 20 |
| 13 | Huddersfield | 26 | 8 | 2 | 16 | 122 | 262 | 18 |
| 14 | Brighouse Rangers | 26 | 3 | 1 | 22 | 74 | 324 | 7 |

=== Lancashire Senior Competition ===
Although participating in the Lancashire Senior Competition, Altrincham, Birkenhead Wanderers, and Stockport were from Cheshire; Hull Kingston Rovers were from Yorkshire; and Millom were from Cumberland.

| Pos | Team | Pld | W | D | L | PF | PA | PAv | Pts | Qualification |
|---|---|---|---|---|---|---|---|---|---|---|
| 1 | Wigan (C) | 24 | 21 | 0 | 3 | 288 | 66 | 4.364 | 42 | Joined the NRFU First Division |
| 2 | Widnes | 24 | 20 | 0 | 4 | 254 | 67 | 3.791 | 40 | Joined the NRFU First Division |
| 3 | St Helens | 24 | 16 | 1 | 7 | 208 | 114 | 1.825 | 33 | Joined the NRFU First Division |
| 4 | Barrow | 24 | 15 | 1 | 8 | 218 | 92 | 2.370 | 31 | Joined the NRFU Second Division |
| 5 | Hull Kingston Rovers | 24 | 14 | 4 | 6 | 274 | 79 | 3.468 | 30 (Note: Two points deducted due to a breach of the professional rules) | Joined the NRFU First Division |
| 6 | Stockport | 24 | 13 | 3 | 8 | 151 | 106 | 1.425 | 27 | Joined the NRFU Second Division |
| 7 | Millom | 24 | 11 | 2 | 11 | 209 | 124 | 1.685 | 24 | Joined the NRFU Second Division |
| 8 | Rochdale Hornets | 24 | 11 | 2 | 11 | 165 | 98 | 1.684 | 24 | Joined the NRFU Second Division |
| 9 | Birkenhead Wanderers | 24 | 8 | 3 | 13 | 127 | 178 | 0.713 | 19 | Joined the NRFU Second Division |
| 10 | Lancaster | 24 | 8 | 1 | 15 | 144 | 152 | 0.947 | 17 | Joined the NRFU Second Division |
| 11 | Morecambe | 24 | 5 | 1 | 18 | 103 | 181 | 0.569 | 11 | Joined the NRFU Second Division |
| 12 | Altrincham | 24 | 2 | 1 | 21 | 20 | 428 | 0.047 | 3 | Resigned from league |
| 13 | Radcliffe | 24 | 2 | 1 | 21 | 58 | 534 | 0.109 | 3 | Resigned from league |

Rules for classification: 1) Points; 2) Points difference; 3) Number of points scored;
(C) Champions

=== Yorkshire Senior Competition ===
| Pos | Team | Pld | W | D | L | PF | PA | PAv | Pts | Qualification |
|---|---|---|---|---|---|---|---|---|---|---|
| 1 | Leeds (C) | 26 | 22 | 2 | 2 | 317 | 63 | 5.032 | 46 | Joined the NRFU Second Division |
| 2 | Manningham | 26 | 19 | 1 | 6 | 212 | 85 | 2.494 | 37 (Note: Two points deducted due to a breach of the professional rules) | Joined the NRFU Second Division |
| 3 | Keighley | 26 | 15 | 6 | 5 | 192 | 117 | 1.641 | 34 | Joined the NRFU Second Division |
| 4 | Wakefield Trinity | 26 | 15 | 1 | 10 | 258 | 90 | 2.867 | 31 | Joined the NRFU Second Division |
| 5 | Holbeck | 26 | 13 | 6 | 7 | 138 | 75 | 1.840 | 30 | Joined the NRFU Second Division |
| 6 | Dewsbury | 26 | 14 | 1 | 11 | 161 | 94 | 1.713 | 29 | Joined the NRFU Second Division |
| 7 | York | 26 | 15 | 1 | 10 | 187 | 130 | 1.438 | 29 | Joined the NRFU Second Division |
| 8 | Normanton | 26 | 13 | 2 | 11 | 148 | 140 | 1.057 | 28 | Joined the NRFU Second Division |
| 9 | Bramley | 26 | 10 | 1 | 15 | 131 | 162 | 0.809 | 21 | Joined the NRFU Second Division |
| 10 | Castleford | 26 | 9 | 3 | 14 | 115 | 163 | 0.706 | 21 | Joined the NRFU Second Division |
| 11 | Heckmondwike | 26 | 7 | 3 | 16 | 83 | 227 | 0.366 | 17 | Resigned from league |
| 12 | Goole | 26 | 5 | 3 | 18 | 94 | 228 | 0.412 | 13 | Resigned from league |
| 13 | Sowerby Bridge | 26 | 7 | 0 | 19 | 65 | 179 | 0.363 | 12 | Resigned from league |
| 14 | Liversedge | 26 | 3 | 0 | 23 | 67 | 415 | 0.161 | 6 | Resigned from league |

Rules for classification: 1) Points; 2) Points difference; 3) Number of points scored;
(C) Champions

== Challenge Cup ==
Broughton Rangers beat Salford 25-0 in the final at Rochdale before a crowd of 15,006.

== Sources ==
- 1901–02 Rugby Football League season at wigan.rlfans.com
- The Challenge Cup at The Rugby Football League website
