= Altrincham (disambiguation) =

Altrincham is a market town in Greater Manchester, England.

Altrincham may also refer to:

- Altrincham (UK Parliament constituency), a county constituency of the House of Commons of the UK Parliament from 1885 to 1945
- Altrincham (ward), an electoral ward of Trafford
- Altrincham F.C., a football club
- Altrincham (rugby league), a former rugby league club
- Baron Altrincham, a title in the British peerage
