= Birkenhead Wanderers FC (rugby league) =

Defunct English rugby league club, based in Birkenhead, Merseyside

Birkenhead Wanderers was a semi-professional rugby league club in Birkenhead, England. They became members of the Northern Rugby Football Union and played in the early years of the competition.

== History ==
=== Early days ===
Birkenhead Wanderers FC was formed as a rugby union club some time before 1895.

During the early years (during the period playing under RFU rules), the club had a prominent player who gained international caps. Samuel "Sam" Houghton, while playing for Birkenhead Wanderers, was picked to play for England in the first of the 1896 Home Nations Championship games on 4 January 1896 and was then picked to play in the second match of the tournament on 1 February. By this time he had re-signed for his old club Runcorn, who had now changed codes to Northern Union.

=== Northern Union ===
Sometime after the Schism, Birkenhead Wanderers decided to change codes and joined the Northern Union.

They entered the Challenge Cup Competition in 1900–01 and lost 2–10 at home to Widnes on 23 March 1901 in the 3rd round.

They joined the ranks of the semi-professionals when they became members of the Northern Union in 1899-1900 and played in the Lancashire Senior Competition, which was effectively Division 2 (West). Although they were from Cheshire, they, like several other Cheshire clubs and some Cumberland clubs, participated in the Lancashire Competitions. The club managed a mid-table position of 7th out of 13 clubs in 1901/02.

At the end of the 1901–02 season, the County Leagues elected 18 teams to join the new Division 2 (7 from Lancashire and 10 from Yorkshire and new member South Shields) with the existing second competition scrapped. This meant that teams were excluded from the senior competitions.

In season 1902–03 Birkenhead Wanderers joined the new 2nd Division, where they would stay for the remainder of their professional existence. The club again managed a mid-table position of 9th out of 18 clubs.

Before the start of their third and final season 1903–04 the club dropped the "Wanderers" suffix, becoming plain Birkenhead. They ended the season in 14th position out of the 17 clubs.

The following season, 1904–05 Birkenhead started off, lost their first four matches failing to score even one solitary point, and resigned from the league. No further history is known for the club.

They are mentioned again in a conflicting report about Prenton (the district) that states – "The Tranmere Rovers came to the Prenton Park Stadium in 1912, after taking the grounds back from the Birkenhead Wanderers Rugby League to whom they had leased it in 1902"

==== Stadium ====
Tranmere Rovers was founded in 1884 and played the first games at Steele's Field. This was just a field with no facilities, named after the landlord of the adjacent Beekeepers' pub. At the end of the 1886/87 season, Tranmere Rovers bought Ravenshaw's Field next door to Tranmere Rugby Club, and relocated. The new ground was quickly enclosed so that gate money could be taken and later improvements included dressing rooms, a small stand and turnstiles. In 1895, what had previously been known as the "Borough-road enclosure" was renamed Prenton Park even though it was outside the Prenton area boundaries. It is on this ground that Birkenhead Wanderers played rugby.

In 1912 Prenton Park was sold off to make way for housing and Tranmere Rovers moved into their 3rd home taking the Prenton Park name with them.

== Colours ==
The club's colours were originally pink and white stripes, but by 1902 blue and white.

== Club league record ==
The league positions for Birkenhead Wanderers for the 3 years in which they played semi-professional rugby league are given in the following table:-

Season	Competition	Pos	Team Name	Pl	W	D	L	PW	PA	Diff	Pts	% Pts	No of teams in league	Notes	Ref
1901–02	Lancs Sen Comp	9	Birkenhead Wand								19		13		
			Only limited County League information is available for this season.												
1902–03	2nd Div	9	Birkenhead Wand	34	14	6	14	125	140	−15	34		18		
At the start of season Birkenhead Wanderers dropped the Wanderers suffix.
1903–04	2nd Div	14	Birkenhead	32	7	0	257	75	334	−259	14		17		
1904–05	2nd Div	**	Birkenhead	4	0	0	4	0	93	−93	**		14		
			Birkenhead's results expunged from records.												

Heading Abbreviations
RL = Single division; Pl = Games played; W = Win; D = Draw; L = Lose; PF = Points for; PA = Points against; Diff = Points difference (+ or -); Pts = League points
% Pts = A percentage system was used to determine league positions due to clubs playing varying number of fixtures and against different opponents
League points: for win = 2; for draw = 1; for loss = 0.

== Several fixtures and results ==
The following are just a few of Birkenhead Wanderers fixtures during the seasons (and other times) in which they played semi-professional rugby league :-

Season	Date	Competition	Opponent	Venue	H/A	Result	Score	Att	Ref
1899-1900	24-02-1900	Lanc Sen Comp	Altrincham	Park Station Ground, Birkenhead	H	Won	11-3	500	
1900–01	23–03-1901	CC R3	Widnes	Prenton Park	H	Lost	2–10		
1901–02	14–09-1901	Lanc Sen Comp	Widnes	Prenton Park	H	Lost	3–16		
1901–02	Sat 05-10-1901	Lanc Sen Comp	Wigan	Springfield Park	A	Lost	3–15		
1901–02	26-10-1901	Lanc Sen Comp	Widnes	Lowerhouse Lane	A	Lost	7–16		
1901–02	16-11-1901	L AB	St. Helens	Prenton Park	H	Lost	0–5		
1901–02	25–01-1902	Lanc Sen Comp	St. Helens	Prenton Park	H	Lost	0–6		
1901–02	Thu 06–03-1902	Lanc Sen Comp	Wigan	Prenton Park	H	Lost	2–17		
1901–02	05–04-1902	Lanc Sen Comp	St. Helens	Knowsley Rd	A	Lost	0–13		
1903–04	12–09-1903	Lanc Sen Comp	St. Helens	Prenton Park	A	Lost	0–3		
1903–04	09–01-1904	Lanc Sen Comp	St. Helens	Knowsley Rd	H	Lost	0–3		

== See also ==
- List of defunct rugby league clubs
