= Tyldesley FC =

Defunct English semi-professional rugby league club

Club information
- Full name: Tyldesley FC
- Nickname: the Bongers
- Founded: 1881; 144 years ago
- Exited: 1901; 124 years ago Re-joined the RFU

Tyldesley was a rugby league club in Tyldesley, Lancashire, England.

The club took part in the meeting at the George Hotel, Huddersfield in 1895 and, after the schism, became founder members of the Northern Rugby Football Union (now Rugby Football League), playing for five seasons from 1895–96 to 1899–1900

== History ==
=== Early Days ===
The first rugby club in Tyldesley was formed in 1881 when, after a meeting of local businessmen and rugby players from other clubs, they decided to move from Garrett Hall to Tyldesley and become Tyldesley Football Club.

In 1891, Tyldesley signed future England International Half-back John "Buff" Berry from Kendal Hornets. He went on to win caps for England (RU) while at Tyldesley in 1891 against Wales, Ireland, and Scotland.

He continued playing for Tyldesley under the Northern Union rules as a stand-off half. Tyldesley beat Widnes to win the 1895 Lancashire (Rugby Union) Cup at Wilderspool Stadium, Warrington, in front of around 15,000 spectators.

=== Northern Union ===
Prior to the Schism, Tyldesley, like many other clubs from Lancashire (and Yorkshire), had suffered punishment by the RFU for "broken time" payments. And so Tyldesley, represented by a Mr. G Taylor, attended a meeting at The George Hotel, Huddersfield, together with representatives of 21 other clubs, and agreed to form the Northern Rugby Football Union.

After the Great Schism in 1895, Tyldesley were one of the founder members of the new league. In the first season 1895-96 the league consisted of 22 clubs and Tyldesley finished in a very creditable 6th position.

In season 1896-97 the league was divided into Yorkshire and Lancashire, Tyldesley playing in the latter section, where they would stay for the remainder of their (semi) professional existence. They again had a quite successful season finishing in 3rd position out of 14 teams

In the two following seasons, still in the Lancashire section, season 1897-98 & 1898-99 they could only manage a lowly 12th position (out of 14 teams).

In the final season, 1899–1900 they won the wooden spoon, finishing 14th out of 14 teams, with only five points thanks to two wins and one draw.

=== Revert to Rugby Union ===
At the end of the 1901–02 season the club, which had played in the Lancashire second competition, disbanded as the club had amassed substantial liabilities. A reformed Tyldesley club was admitted to the Rugby Football Union in 1911.

In 1926, landowning Club President (Mr. William Hesketh Ramsden) gave the Well Street ground in trust to the Club.

== Colours ==
The earliest recorded colours of the club are white shirts and navy blue knickers; by 1900 the club was wearing navy blue.

== Club League Record ==
The League positions for Tyldesley for the 5 years in which they played (semi) professional Rugby League are given in the following table :-

Season	Competition	Pos	Team Name	Pl	W	D	L	PW	PA	Diff	Pts	% Pts	No of teams in league	Notes	Ref
1895–96	RL	6	Tyldesley	42	21	8	13	260	164	96	50		22		
			Only limited County League information is available for this season.												
1896–97	Lancs Sen Comp	3	Tyldesley	26	15	2	9	159	80	79	32		14		
1897–98	Lancs Sen Comp	12	Tyldesley	26	8	1	17	111	281	-170	17		14		
1898–99	Lancs Sen Comp	12	Tyldesley	26	3	5	18	82	240	-158	11		14		
1899–1900	Lancs Sen Comp	14	Tyldesley	26	2	1	23	66	336	-270	5	20.83	14		

Heading Abbreviations
RL = Single Division; Pl = Games played; W = Win; D = Draw; L = Lose; PF = Points for; PA = Points against; Diff = Points difference (+ or -); Pts = League points
% Pts = A percentage system was used to determine league positions due to clubs playing varying number of fixtures and against different opponents
League points: for win = 2; for draw = 1; for loss = 0.

== Several fixtures & results ==
The following are just a few of Tyldesley's fixtures during the five seasons (and other times) in which they played (semi) professional Rugby League :-

Season	Date	Competition	Opponent	Venue	H/A	Result	Score	Att	Notes	Ref
1895–96	Sat 28 September 1895	Rl	Wigan	Folly Field	A	Draw	0-0	" "	1	
1895–96	Sat 26 October 1895	RL	St. Helens	Knowsley Road	A	Draw	3-3			
1895–96	2 November 1895	Rl	Widnes	Home	H	Won	9-0			
1895–96	30 November 1895	RL	Warrington	Home	H	Lost	3-10			
1895–96	Sat 28 December 1895	Rl	Hull	Boulevard	H	Won	3-0			
1895–96	8 February 1896	RL	Widnes	Lowerhouse Lane	A	Lost	0-11		2	
1895–96	7 March 1896	Rl	Warrington	Wilderspool	H	Draw	3-3			
1895–96	Sat 21 March 1896	RL	Hull	Home	H	Won	18-0			
1895–96	Sat 28 March 1896	Rl	St Helens	Home	H	Won	11-10			
1895–96	Tue 21 April 1896	RL	Wigan	Home	H	Won	5-0			
1896–97	-1 -1 1896	Lanc Sen Comp	Widnes	Lowerhouse Lane	A	Won	8-4		2	
1896–97	Sat 26 September 1896	Lanc Sen Comp	St Helens	Knowsley Road	A	Lost	0-3			
1896–97	Sat 31 October 1896	Lanc Sen Comp	Wigan	Folly Field	A	Won	3-0		1	
1896–97	7 November 1896	Lanc Sen Comp	Widnes	Home	H	Won	|			
1896–97	Sat 5 December 1896	Lanc Sen Comp	Wigan	Home	H	Won	8-0			
1896–97	19 December 1896	Lanc Sen Comp	Warrington	Home	H	Won	3-0			
1896–97	Sat 20 February 1897	Lanc Sen Comp	St Helens	Home	H	Won	12-9			
1896–97	27 February 1897	Lanc Sen Comp	Warrington	Wilderspool	H	Won	6-0			
1896–97	27 March 1897	CC R2	Leeds	Home	H	Won	9-3			
1896–97	Sat 10 April 1897	CC R4	St Helens	Knowsley Road	A	Lost	0-12			
1897–98	Sat 25 December 1897	Lanc Sen Comp	Wigan	Folly Field	A	Lost	2-3		1	
1897–98	4 September 1897	Lanc Sen Comp	Warrington	Home	H	Won	19-0			
1897–98	Sat 25 September 1897	Lanc Sen Comp	St Helens	Knowsley Road	A	Lost	0-11			
1897–98	Sat 9 October 1897	Lanc Sen Comp	Wigan	Home	H	Won	3-0			
1897–98	13 November 1897	Lanc Sen Comp	Widnes	Home	H	Lost	2-27			
1897–98	4 December 1897	Lanc Sen Comp	Warrington	Wilderspool	H	Lost	0-9			
18 97-98	18 December 1897	Lanc Sen Comp	Widnes	Lowerhouse Lane	A	Lost	0-3		2	
1897–98	Sat 15 January 1898	Lanc Sen Comp	St Helens	Home	H	Won	8-3			
1897–98	Fri 8 April 1898	Friendly	Hull	Boulevard	H	Lost	2-9			
1898–99	1 October 1898	Lanc Sen Comp	Widnes	Home	H	Lost	4-8			
1898–99	29 October 1898	Lanc Sen Comp	Warrington	Wilderspool	H	Lost	4-21			
1898–99	Sat 24 December 1898	Lanc Sen Comp	Wigan	Home	H	Draw	0-0			
1898–99	Mon 26 December 1898	Lanc Sen Comp	St Helens	Knowsley Road	A	Lost	5-9			
1898–99	21 January 1899	Lanc Sen Comp	Warrington	Home	H	Lost	0-6			
1898–99	Sat 11 February 1899	Lanc Sen Comp	St Helens	Home	H	Lost	3-6			
1898–99	Sat 4 March 1899	Lanc Sen Comp	Wigan	Folly Field	A	Draw	0-0		1	
1898–99	15 April 1899	Lanc Sen Comp	Widnes	Lowerhouse Lane	A	Lost	2-14		2	
1899–1900	26 October 1899	Lanc Sen Comp	Warrington	Wilderspool	H	Lost	0-22			
1899–1900	11 November 1899	Lanc Sen Comp	Widnes	Home	H	Lost	3-10			
1899–1900	25 November 1899	Lanc Sen Comp	Widnes	Lowerhouse Lane	A	Lost	0-11		2	
1899–1900	Sat 2 December 1899	Lanc Sen Comp	St Helens	Knowsley Road	A	Lost	3-26			
1899–1900	Sat 23 December 1899	Lanc Sen Comp	Wigan	Folly Field	A	Lost	6-15		1	
1899–1900	Sat 30 December 1899	Lanc Sen Comp	St Helens	Home	H	Lost	3-14			
1899–1900	7 January 1900	Lanc Sen Comp	Warrington	Home	H	Lost	0-11			
1899–1900	Sat 13 January 1900	Lanc Sen Comp	Wigan	Home	H	Lost	5-7			
1899–1900	Sat 24 February 1900	Lanc Sen Comp	Millom	Home	H	Lost	7-11			
1899–1900	17 April 1900	SWL R1	Widnes	Lowerhouse Lane	A	Lost	6-23		2	

== Notes and Comments ==
1. Folly Field is the stadium used by Wigan at the time until 1901. They then became sub-tenants of Springfield Park See below - Note 3.
2. Lowerhouse Lane is the original site of the current ground used by Widnes. It was renamed Naughton Park in 1932 in honour of club secretary, Tom Naughton - and later renamed Halton Stadium after being completely rebuilt in 1997.
3. Wigan became sub-tenants of Springfield Park, which they shared with Wigan United AFC, playing their first game there on 14 September 1901 at which a crowd of 4,000 saw them beat Morecambe 12–0, and the last game on 28 April 1902 when Wigan beat the Rest of Lancashire Senior Competition. A temporary ground was necessary to span the period between moving from Folly Field and the new ground at Central Park being constructed.

== See also ==
- British rugby league system
- Cumberland League
- Rugby league county leagues
- List of defunct rugby league clubs
