= Roy Lambert =

Roy Lambert may refer to:

- Roy Lambert (rugby league), Welsh rugby league player
- Roy Lambert (footballer) (1933–2022), English footballer
