= 1897–98 Northern Rugby Football Union season =

- Structure: Separate county competitions

1897–98 Season
- Top point-scorer: Albert Goldthorpe ( Hunslet) 135
- Top try-scorer: Hoskins ( Salford) 30

Lancashire League
- Champions: Oldham

Yorkshire League
- Champions: Hunslet

The 1897–98 Northern Rugby Football Union season was the third season of rugby league football.

== Summary ==
The leading try scorer this season was Hoskins of Salford, who crossed the line 30 times. The leading goal scorer was Albert Goldthorpe of Hunslet who was successful 66 times. The leading points scorer was also Goldthorpe who scored 135 points in the season.

Oldham won the Lancashire Senior Competition and Hunslet won in Yorkshire, but only after winning a play-off with Bradford.

== Rule changes ==
- The line-out was abolished and replaced with the punt-out.
- The value of all goals was reduced to two points.

== Lancashire Senior Competition ==
Oldham won the Lancashire competition outright. Although participating in the Lancashire Senior Competition, Runcorn and Stockport were from Cheshire. Warrington, and Widnes were in Lancashire until the 1974 boundary changes and now lie within the northern boundary of Cheshire.

	Team	Pld	W	D	L	PF	PA	PD	Pts
1	Oldham	26	22	1	2	295	94	+201	47
2	Swinton	26	20	3	3	321	83	+238	43
3	Widnes	26	19	1	6	251	114	+137	39
4	Salford	26	16	3	7	275	182	+93	33
5	Broughton Rangers	26	13	4	9	183	108	+75	30
6	Wigan	26	11	1	14	124	173	-49	23
7	Leigh	26	11	2	13	176	170	+6	22
8	St. Helens	26	10	2	14	161	192	-31	22
9	Warrington	26	10	2	14	131	178	-47	22
10	Runcorn	26	9	2	15	142	184	-42	20
11	Stockport	26	8	2	16	154	253	-99	18
12	Tyldesley	26	8	1	17	111	281	-170	17
13	Rochdale Hornets	26	7	0	19	146	247	-101	14
14	Morecambe	26	4	2	20	74	285	-211	10

Source: R.L.Yearbook 1995-96 cited in "The Vault".
League points: for win = 2; for draw = 1; for loss = 0.
Pld = Games played; W = Wins; D = Draws; L = Losses; PF = Match points scored; PA = Match points conceded; PD = Points difference; Pts = League points.

Notes

a: Salford had 2 points deducted for fielding an ineligible player
b: Leigh had 2 points deducted for fielding an ineligible player

== Yorkshire Senior Competition ==
Hunslet and Bradford ended the league season with 48 points. In a championship play-off Hunslet beat Bradford 5–2.

	Team	Pld	W	D	L	PF	PA	PD	Pts
1	Hunslet	30	22	4	4	327	117	+210	48
2	Bradford	30	23	2	5	319	139	+180	48
3	Batley	30	17	3	10	234	111	+123	37
4	Halifax	30	16	3	11	193	164	+29	35
5	Manningham	30	15	4	11	276	181	+95	34
6	Castleford	30	16	1	13	256	208	+48	33
7	Wakefield Trinity	30	16	1	13	248	214	+34	33
8	Leeds Parish Church	30	15	1	14	187	213	-26	31
9	Leeds	30	13	4	13	186	171	+15	30
10	Huddersfield	30	12	3	15	208	170	+38	27
11	Hull	30	11	4	15	192	187	+5	26
12	Bramley	30	11	4	15	156	199	-43	26
13	Brighouse Rangers	30	9	5	16	143	172	-29	23
14	Holbeck	30	11	0	19	171	310	-139	22
15	Heckmondwike	30	9	2	19	148	315	-167	20
16	Liversedge	30	3	1	26	76	449	-373	7

Source: R.L.Yearbook 1995-96 cited in "The Vault".
League points: for win = 2; for draw = 1; for loss = 0.
Pld = Games played; W = Wins; D = Draws; L = Losses; PF = Match points scored; PA = Match points conceded; PD = Points difference; Pts = League points.
