= James Dechan =

Rugby league player

Personal information
- Full name: James Dechan
- Born: unknown
- Died: unknown

Playing information
- Position: Wing, Centre
Club
Years	Team	Pld	T	G	FG	P
1903–07	Bradford F.C.	123	91	0	0	273
1908/09–09/10	Hull F.C.
	Total	123	91	0	0	273
Representative
Years	Team	Pld	T	G	FG	P
1904–06	Yorkshire	4	1	0	0	3
1905	Other Nationalities	1	0	0	0	0

James "Jim" Dechan (birth unknown - death unknown) was a professional rugby league footballer who played in the 1900s. He played at representative level for Other Nationalities, and at club level for Bradford F.C. (now Bradford Park Avenue A.F.C.) and Hull F.C., as a wing or centre.

== Playing career ==
=== Club career ===
Initially a rugby union player with Hawick RFC, Dechan converted to rugby league in 1903, joining Bradford FC.

Dechan played on the wing in Bradford FC's 5-0 victory over Salford in the Championship tiebreaker during the 1903–04 season at Thrum Hall, Hanson Lane, Halifax on Thursday 28 April 1904, in front of a crowd of 12,000.

Dechan played at centre in Bradford F.C.'s 5-0 victory over Salford in the 1906 Challenge Cup Final during the 1905–06 season at Headingley, Leeds, on Saturday 28 April 1906, in front of a crowd of 15,834.

Dechan was the league's top try-scorer in the 1904–05 season with 31-tries. Jim Dechan holds Bradford F.C.'s "Most Tries In A Game" record with 7-tries against Bramley on Saturday 13 October 1906 (Note: This record is sometimes quoted as being a Bradford Northern/Bradford Bulls record, but this club was formed in 1907 after this record was set, and after Bradford F.C. became an association football (soccer) club.)

=== International honours ===
Dechan won a cap for Other Nationalities while at Bradford F.C. in 1905 against England.
