= Archie Rigg =

English rugby footballer and coach

Personal information
- Full name: James Archer Rigg
- Born: 14 February 1873 Halifax district, England
- Died: 29 May 1951 (aged 78) Halifax, England

Playing information

Rugby union
Club
Years	Team	Pld	T	G	FG	P
1891–95	Halifax	89

Rugby league
- Position: Scrum-half
Club
Years	Team	Pld	T	G	FG	P
1895–1908	Halifax	243	91	41	3	384
1908–12	Bradford Northern	58	14	0	0	42
1912	Halifax	1	0	0	0	0
	Total	302	105	41	3	426
Representative
Years	Team	Pld	T	G	FG	P
1895–1903	Yorkshire	14	8	0	0	24

Coaching information
Club
Years	Team	Gms	W	D	L	W%
1919–≥19	Halifax RUFC

James Archer Rigg (14 February 1873 – 29 May 1951), also known by the nickname of "Archie ", was an English rugby union, and professional rugby league footballer who played in the 1890s and 1900s, and coached rugby union in the 1910s and 1920s. He played club level rugby union (RU) for Halifax, and representative level rugby league (RL) for Yorkshire, and at club level for Halifax and Bradford Northern, as a scrum-half and coached rugby union at the newly established Halifax RUFC (formed 1919), after completing his playing career, with fellow Halifax Hall Of Fame Inductee Joe Riley. Prior to Tuesday 27 August 1895, Halifax was a rugby union club.

== Background ==
Archie Rigg's birth was registered in Halifax district, West Riding of Yorkshire. He died at his home in Halifax on 29 May 1951, aged 79.

== Playing career ==
=== Club career ===
Rigg made his début on Saturday 19 September 1891 under rugby union rules, helping the club win the Yorkshire Cup in 1893 and 1894.

After Halifax joined the Northern Union, Rigg was rugby league's 1896–97 Northern Rugby Football Union season top point scorer, with 112-points, and he played for Halifax until 1906 before moving to Bradford.

Rigg played, and was captain in Halifax's 7–0 victory over by Salford in the 1903 Challenge Cup final, during the 1902–03 season at Headingley, Leeds, in front of a crowd of 32,507.

Rigg's Testimonial match at Halifax took place against Huddersfield at Thrum Hall, Halifax on Saturday 23 January 1904, Halifax's first ever matchday programme was produced for the match.

=== County honours ===
Rigg won caps for Yorkshire (RL) while at Halifax.

== Honoured at Halifax ==
Rigg is a Halifax Hall Of Fame Inductee.
