= List of defunct rugby league clubs =

This is a list of defunct professional rugby league clubs.

== Australia ==
=== New South Wales Rugby League (1908–1994) ===
Club	First year	Last Year	Reason
Annandale	1910	1920	
Cumberland	1908	1908	
Glebe Dirty Reds	1908	1929	Glebe Dirty Reds still exist at New South Wales Cup level.
Newcastle Rebels	1908	1909	Newcastle exist in the modern day competition, in a new form. The "original" Newcastle side disbanded in 1909 to form the Newcastle competition, and the "modern" Newcastle Knights were formed in 1988.
Newtown Jets	1908	1983	Newtown Jets still exist at New South Wales Cup level. Excluded for financial reasons.
University	1920	1937	University were reformed in 2018 and still exist at Sydney Shield level.

=== ARL (1995–1997), SL (1997) and NRL (1998–) ===
Club	First League season	Last League season	Reason	Current status
Adelaide Rams	1997	1998	Shutdown as part of the ARL and Super League merger to end the Super League war.	
Balmain Tigers	1908	1999	Merged with the Western Suburbs Magpies	Became Wests Tigers in 2000
Gold Coast Chargers	1988	1998	Shutdown as part of the ARL and Super League merger to end the Super League war.	Gold Coast Titans formed in 2007
Hunter Mariners	1997	1997	Shutdown as part of the ARL and Super League merger to end the Super League war.	
Illawarra Steelers	1982	1998	Merged with the St. George Dragons	Became St George Illawarra Dragons in 1999
North Sydney Bears	1908	1999	Merged with the Manly-Warringah Sea Eagles	Became Northern Eagles in 2000.
Northern Eagles	2000	2002	Disbanded	Reverted to Manly-Warringah Sea Eagles and North Sydney Bears in 2003
St. George Dragons	1921	1998	Merged with the Illawarra Steelers	Became St George Illawarra Dragons in 1999
South Queensland Crushers	1995	1997	Shutdown as part of the ARL and Super League merger to end the Super League war.	
Western Reds	1995	1997	Shutdown as part of the ARL and Super League merger to end the Super League war.	
Western Suburbs Magpies	1908	1999	Merged with the Balmain Tigers	Became Wests Tigers in 2000

The teams listed above, with the exception of Adelaide, Hunter, Gold Coast, Northern Eagles and South Queensland still participate in lower level competitions, including the NSW Cup, S.G. Ball and Harold Matthews competitions.

=== Queensland Cup (1996–) ===
This section particularly includes the Queensland Rugby League sides which no longer compete in the top level of that league.

Club	First year	Last Year	Reason
Brothers-Valleys	2002	2002	
Bundaberg Grizzlies			
Cairns Cyclones	1996	1996	
Central Capras			
Gold Coast Vikings	1982	1995	
Logan Scorpions	1987	2002	Merged with Souths Magpies to form Souths Logan Magpies.
Mackay Sea Eagles			
Past Brothers	1917	1998	
Port Moresby Vipers			
Sunshine Coast Falcons	1996	1996	
Souths Magpies	1921	2002	Merged with the Logan Scorpions to form Souths Logan Magpies.
Toowoomba Clydesdales	1996	2006	
Townsville Stingers			
Wests Panthers	1915	2003	

=== Brisbane Rugby League (1909–1997) ===
Club	First year	Last Year	Reason
Fortitude Valley Diehards	1909	1995	
Milton			
Toombul	1996	1996	
University	1922	1933	

== England ==
These clubs competed in the Rugby Football League from 1895.

Club	First League season	Last League season	Reason	Current status
Acton & Willesden	1935	1936	Folded	
Altrincham	1901	1902	Folded	
Birkenhead Wanderers	1901	1904	Folded	
Blackpool Gladiators	1954	1993	Folded	
Blackpool Panthers	2004	2010	Liquidated in 2011	
Bradford F.C.	1864	1907	Switched to association football	Reformed as Bradford Park Avenue
Bramley	1896	1999	Folded	Reformed as Bramley Buffaloes in 2004
Brighouse Rangers	1895	1906	Folded	Reformed as an amateur club.
Broughton Rangers	1895	1955	Disbanded	
Carlisle	1981	1997	Merged with Barrow Braves	Currently known as Barrow Raiders
Carlisle City	1928	1928	Resigned mid-season	
Castleford RFC	1896	1906	Disbanded	Castleford Tigers formed in 1926
Chorley Lynx	1989	2004	Folded	Blackpool Panthers formed in 2004
Coventry	1910	1913	Disbanded	Coventry Bears formed in 1999
Gateshead Thunder	1999	1999	Merged with Hull F.C. after 1999 season	Reformed as Newcastle Thunder in 2001
Goole	1901	1902	Folded	
Heckmondwike	1896	1902	Folded	
Holbeck	1896	1904	Folded	
Hunslet F.C.	1895	1973	Folded	Reformed as New Hunslet in 1973
Kent Invicta (1983–84)/Southend Invicta (1984–85)	1983	1985	Liquidated in 1985	
Lancaster	1901	1905	Folded	
Leeds Parish Church	1896	1901	Folded	
Liverpool City	1906	1909	Folded	Another Liverpool City formed in 1958 but folded
Liversedge	1895	1902	Folded	
Manningham	1895	1903	Switched to association football	Reformed as Bradford City
Nottingham City	1984	1993	Resigned from the league	Became an amateur club after relegation from the professional leagues in 1993.
Millom	1897	1906	Resigned	Reverted to amateur status and joined Cumberland Senior Competition.
Morecambe	1896	1901	Folded	
Newcastle	1936	1938	Folded	Gateshead Thunder formed in 2001 and were renamed Newcastle Thunder in 2015
Normanton	1901	1907	Folded	Reformed as an amateur club
Pontefract	1903	1907	Folded	
Radcliffe	1901	1902	Folded	
Runcorn	1895	1914	Folded	
Scarborough Pirates	1991	1992	Folded	Reformed as an amateur club
Sheffield Eagles (1984)	1984	1999	Merged with Huddersfield Giants in 1999	Reformed as Sheffield Eagles in 2000
South Shields	1902	1904	Folded	
Sowerby Bridge	1901	1905	Folded	
St Helens Recs	1918	1939	Folded	Reformed as an amateur side Pilkington Recs in 1949
Stockport	1895	1903	Folded	
Streatham & Mitcham	1935	1936	Folded	
Tyldesley	1895	1900	Folded	Reverted to Rugby Union in 1911
Prescot Panthers	1902	1997	Folded	
York Wasps	1895	2002	Folded	Reformed as York City Knights in 2002

== France ==
- AS Saint Estève (1965–2000)

Merged with XIII Catalan to form Union Treiziste Catalane.

- Celtic de Paris (1950-197?)
- Marseille XIII (1946–2006)
- Paris Saint-Germain (1996–1997)
- XIII Catalan (1935–2000)

Merged with AS Saint Estève to form Union Treiziste Catalane.

== New Zealand ==
=== Bartercard Cup (2000–) ===
- Eastern Tornadoes (2000–2005)
- Marist Richmond Brothers (2000–2005)
- North Harbour Tigers (2003 - 2005)
- Otahuhu Ellerslie Leopards (2004–2005)
- Porirua Pumas (2000–2001)
- Taranaki Wildcats (2002–2003)

=== Lion Red Cup (1994–1996) ===
- Auckland City Vulcans (1994)
- Canterbury Country Cardinals (1994-6)
- Christchurch City Shiners (1994-6)
- Counties Manukau Heroes (1994-6)
- Hutt Valley Firehawks (1994-6)
- North Harbour Sea Eagles (1994-6)
- Waitakere City Raiders (1994-6)
- Wellington City Dukes (1994-6)

== Wales ==
=== Welsh League (1908–1909) ===
(these teams also competed in the Northern Rugby Football Union)

Club	First year	Last Year	International capped players	Notes
Aberdare RLFC	1908	1909	Will Hopkins for Wales 1908 against England	
Barry RLFC	1908	1908		
Ebbw Vale RLFC	1907	1912	Oliver Burgham for Wales 1908 against New Zealand and England; John "Jack" Foley for Wales 1909 against England; W. E. 'Chick' Jenkins for Wales 1908–1912 (7-caps); Lewis Llewellyn for Wales 1910–1912 (4-caps).	
Merthyr Tydfil RLFC	1907	1911	David Davies for Wales 1909 against England; David 'Dai' 'Tarw' Jones for Wales 1908 against New Zealand, and for Great Britain 1908 against New Zealand (2 matches)	
Mid-Rhondda RLFC	1908	1909		
Treherbert RLFC	1908	1910	David Galloway (#9) for Wales 1909 and 1910 against England (2 caps)	

=== Welsh League (1949–55) ===
Club	First year	Last Year	International capped players	Notes
Aberavon RLFC	1949	1955	Melvyn Ford for Wales while at Aberavon 1951	
Amman Valley RLFC	1949	1955		Played at Brewery Field, with Bridgend RFC temporarily moving out.
Bridgend RLFC	1949	1955		
Cardiff RLFC	1951	1952	Milson Hunt for Wales while at Cardiff in 1951; Glyn Morgan for Wales while at Huddersfield, and Cardiff 1947-1949 4-caps; Ted Ward for Wales while at Wigan, and Cardiff 1946-1951 13-caps, and for Great Britain while at Wigan in 1946 against Australia (2 matches) and New Zealand	Also played in the Northern Rugby Football Union
Llanelli RLFC	1949	1955		
Neath RLFC	1949	1955	Roy Lambert for Wales while at Neath, Dewsbury, and Warrington 1950–1952 (7 caps)	
Swansea RLFC	1949	1955		
Ystradgynlais RLFC	1949	1955		

=== Northern Rugby Football Union (1895–) ===
Club	First year	Last Year	International capped players	Notes
Cardiff City Blue Dragons	1981	1984		Relocated and became Bridgend Blue Dragons (1984–1985) before disbanding.
Pontypridd	1926	1927	Ponty Davies won caps for Wales 1926-1927 2-caps, and while at Warrington in 1928; Bert Green for Wales 1926-1927 2-caps; George Oliver for Wales (RU) for Wales (RU) while at Pontypool RFC in 1920 against England, Scotland, France, and Ireland, and for Wales (RL) while at Hull, and Pontypridd 1921–1927 (4-caps); Billy Rhodes for Wales 1926; Les White for Wales while at Pontypridd and Hunslet 1928–1933 (7-caps) for England while at Hunslet 1933 against Australia, and for Great Britain while at Hunslet in 1932 against Australia (3 matches), and New Zealand (2 matches), and in 1933 Australia (2 matches)	
South Wales	1996	-		Lasted one season - by 1996 the season had switched to summer.
Celtic Crusaders	2005	2011		Initially based in Bridgend, 2010 and 2011 were played in Wrexham as the Crusaders
South Wales Scorpions	2010	2017		Formed when Crusaders relocated to North Wales and placed in the third tier of (semi) professional RL. The 2017 season was played under the South Wales Ironmen brand before the team was re-branded and relocated for 2018 as West Wales Raiders.
West Wales Raiders	2018	2022		Formed when South Wales Ironmen were re-branded and moved to Llanelli by amateur club Gwendraeth Valley Raiders and renamed West Wales Raiders.Club folded 2022.

== See also ==
- List of defunct rugby league clubs in the United States
