= Jacky Braithwaite =

England international rugby union player

- Born: John Braithwaite; 21 April 1873 Leeds, England
- Died: 14 November 1915 (aged 42) West Humberstone, Leicester, England
- Height: 5 ft 9 in (175 cm)
- Weight: 9 st (126 lb; 57 kg)
- Occupation: Engineer

Rugby union career
- Position: Scrum half
Senior career
Years	Team	Apps	(Points)
1895–1906	Leicester Tigers	359	(361)
International career
Years	Team	Apps	(Points)
1905	England	1	

John "Jacky" Braithwaite (21 April 1873 – 14 November 1915) was a rugby union scrum half who played 359 times for Leicester Tigers between 1895 and 1906 scoring 67 tries, 45 conversions, 2 penalties, 15 drop goals and one goal from a mark for 361 points. Braithwaite was born in Leeds and played local rugby for St Cuthbert's, Holbeck and Vulcan Rovers before moving to Leicester. He made his Leicester debut against Bedford on 12 October 1895 and played 7 times that season. He became a regular in the First XV the next season and went on to win 8 successive Midlands Counties Cups from 1898–1905, during his career he only lost one of 34 fixtures in the cup. Braithwaite started a record 236 games with fly half partner Billy Foreman for Leicester.

Braithwaite made his international debut for England on 2 December 1905 in England's first international against New Zealand at Crystal Palace. It was his only cap for England.

== Sources ==
Farmer, Stuart & Hands, David Tigers-Official History of Leicester Football Club (The Rugby DevelopmentFoundation ISBN 978-0-9930213-0-5)
