= Pontefract (rugby league) =

Defunct English rugby league club, based in Pontefract, Yorkshire

Pontefract was a semi-professional rugby league club based in Pontefract, a market town within the City of Wakefield in West Yorkshire, England.

The club joined the Northern Union in 1903–04 and played for a total of three full seasons until 1905–06. The following season 1906–07 saw them resign early into the season and the club folded.

== History ==
The club joined the Rugby League 2nd Division for the 1903-04 season finishing 10th out of 17 and scoring 24 points more than they conceded.

They continued in the 2nd Division for the following season 1904-05, their second season.

The third season, 1905-06, was spent in the enlarged league finishing 19th out of 31 and scoring 23 points more than they conceded.

The following season 1906-07 saw Pontefract resign from the league after eight matches and the club folded. Their record was expunged.

== Club League Record ==
The league positions for Pontefract for the 3 full seasons (plus the fourth part season) in which they played semi-professional rugby league are given in the following table :-

Season	Competition	Pos	Team Name	Pl	W	D	L	PW	PA	Diff	Pts	% Pts	No of teams in league	Notes	Ref
1903-04	2nd Division	10	Pontefract	32	14	6	12	174	150	24	34		17		
1904-05	2nd Division	8	Pontefract	26	10	1	15	156	175	-19	21		14		
1905-06	RL	24	Pontefract	28	11	1	16	211	196	15	23	41.07	31		
1906-07	RL	**	Pontefract	8	3	0	5	63	154	-91	6	37.5	26**		
			Pontefract resigned after 8 matches and their record was struck out.												

Heading Abbreviations
RL = Single Division; Pl = Games played; W = Win; D = Draw; L = Lose; PF = Points for; PA = Points against; Diff = Points difference (+ or -); Pts = League points
% Pts = A percentage system was used to determine league positions due to clubs playing varying number of fixtures and against different opponents
League points: for win = 2; for draw = 1; for loss = 0.

== Fixtures & results ==
The following is one of Pontefract's fixtures during the five season (and other times) in which they played semi-professional rugby league :-

Season	Date	Competition	Opponent	Venue	H/A	Result	Score	Att	Notes	Ref
1903-04	Sat 2 Apr 1904	Challenge Cup 3rd Round	Warrington	Home	H	Lost	4-10	?	1	
1906-07	08-09-1906	league ??	Swinton	Chorley Road	A	Lost	4-76		2,3	
1906-07	??-12-1906	league ??	Swinton	Home	H	Won	5-0		3	

== Notes and Comments ==
- Warrington’s record in the Challenge Cup in 1903-04 is Preliminary Round Beat Swinton 20–0 at Wilderspool (16/03/04) after 0–0 draw at Swinton's Chorley Road (12/03/04)
  - Round 1 Beat Wigan at Wilderspool 3-0 (19/03/04)
  - Semi-Final Beat Bradford 8–0 on neutral ground (20/04/04) after 3–3 draw (16/04/04) Final Lost to Halifax 3–8 at The Willows, Salford (30/04/04)
- In 1886 Swinton moved into their Chorley Road ground. They remained there until 1929 when they moved to what was to become the large International standard ground at Station Road, quite near their original .
- On Saturday 8 September 1906, Swinton hosted a Pontefract team who arrived with only 12 players. The Lions scored 18 tries in a club record 76–4 victory. This record would stand for ninety years.

== See also ==
- British rugby league system
- Cumberland League
- Rugby league county leagues
- Swinton - early history
- List of defunct rugby league clubs
