= Lancaster RFC =

Defunct English semi-professional rugby league club

Club information
- Full name: Lancaster Rugby Football Club
- Colours: Red and white hoops
- Founded: 1870; 156 years ago
- Exited: 1905; 121 years ago

Former details
- Competition: 1904–05 Northern Rugby Football Union season

Lancaster RFC was a semi-professional rugby league club based in Lancaster, Lancashire, England.

The club first became members of the Northern Rugby Football Union (now Rugby Football League) in 1897, and joined the semi-professional ranks in the Lancashire Senior Competition in 1901–02. They played in the 2nd Division for the following three seasons. At the end of season 1904–05 the club left the league. The club was dissolved shortly afterwards.

== History ==
=== Early days ===
The original Lancaster RFC was formed in 1870. The club, along with Morecambe Bay neighbours Barrow, Ulverston and Millom joined the Northern Union in 1897, forming a 'North West Rugby League'. Around the turn of the century there were seven Northern Union clubs in and around the city.

During the early years the club had two prominent players who gained international caps. These were: "Gentleman" Jim Leytham, who joined Lancaster RFC in 1897, and John Pinch.

=== Northern Union ===
Lancaster joined the ranks of the semi-professionals for the start of the 1901–02 season when they became members of the Northern Union. During that season they played in the Lancashire Senior Competition finishing in 10th position out of 17.

At the end of the 1901–02 season, the County Leagues elected 18 teams to join the new Division 2 (7 from Lancashire and 10 from Yorkshire and new member South Shields) with the existing second competition scrapped.

In the 1902–03 season, Lancaster joined the new 2nd Division, where they would stay for the next three seasons. In the first season in this division, (1902–03), they finished 11th out of 18 clubs.

In the following two seasons the club managed a mid-table position of 13th out of 18 and a lowly position of 12th out of 14 in 1903–04 and 1904–05 respectively. Lancaster dropped out of the league after the end of the season 1904–05 season. In each of the four seasons, comparing with the results of its near neighbours, Lancaster finished below Millom and Barrow and above Morecambe in every season.

Lancaster also had a second team who played in the Westmorland League. Their opponents included Marsh Hornets, Carnforth, Holme, Kendal Hornets and Kirkby Lonsdale as well as the second teams of Barrow and Morecambe.

=== Centenary match ===
In 1904, Morecambe and Lancaster, very close neighbours, were drawn against each other in the first round of the Rugby League Challenge Cup.

100 years later the two clubs Morecambe (being represented by Heysham Atoms ARLFC) and Lancaster agreed to play a centenary commemorative match; the winner would be presented with the "Morecambe Bay State of Origin Trophy". And so on Tuesday 11 May 2004, at Lancaster City AFC’s Giant Axe Stadium, Morecambe (playing in the traditional black and white hoops) beat Lancaster (in red and white hoops) 24–15.

=== Stadium ===
Lancaster played at Quay Meadow, which was located behind the buildings on St Georges Quay. In 1905 the newly formed Lancaster Athletic FC played their first two matches at this stadium before moving to the Giant Axe Stadium.

== Club league record ==
The League positions for Lancaster for the three years in which they played semi-professional rugby league are given in the following table:

Season	Competition	Pos	Team Name	Pl	W	D	L	PW	PA	Diff	Pts	% Pts	No of teams in league	Notes	Ref
1901–02	Lancs Sen Comp	10	Lancaster								17		13		
Only limited County League information is available for this season.
1902–03	2nd Div	11	Lancaster	34	13	4	17	123	214	–91	30		18		
1903–04	2nd Div	13	Lancaster	32	8	2	24	129	291	-162	18		17		
1904–05	2nd Div	12	Lancaster	26	8	1	17	106	257	-151	17		14		

Heading Abbreviations

RL = Single Division; Pl = Games played; W = Win; D = Draw; L = Lose; PF = Points for; PA = Points against; Diff = Points difference (+ or -); Pts = League Points

% Pts = A percentage system was used to determine league positions due to clubs playing varying number of fixtures and against different opponents

League points: for win = 2; for draw = 1; for loss = 0.

== Several fixtures and results ==
The following are just a few of Lancaster fixtures during the three seasons (and other times) in which they played semi-professional rugby league:

Season	Date	Competition	Opponent	Venue	H/A	Result	Score	Att	Notes	Ref
1898–99	Sat 15-10-1898	Friendly	St. Helens	Quay Meadows	H	Won	8–2			
1899–1900	Sat 23-09-1899	Friendly	St. Helens	Knowsley Road	A	Lost	3–17			
1899–1900	Sat 14-04-1900	Friendly	St. Helens	Quay Meadows	H	Lost	8–15			
1901–02	Sat 14-09-1901	Lancs Sen Comp	St. Helens	Knowsley Road	A	Lost	0–4			
1901–02	Sat 28-09-1901	Lancs Sen Comp	Wigan	Springfield Park	A	Lost	0–11		3	
1901–02	Sat 26-10-1901	Lancs Sen Comp	St. Helens	Quay Meadows	H	Won	17–4			
1901–02	Sat 23-11-1901	Lancs Sen Comp	Wigan	Quay Meadows	H	Lost	2–5			
1901–02	14-12-1901	Lancs Sen Comp	Widnes	Lowerhouse Lane	A	Lost	5–29	0	2	
1901–02	09-04-1902	Lancs Sen Comp	Widnes	Quay Meadows	H	Lost	0–5	0		
1903–04	Sat 26-12-1903	L OBJ	St. Helens	Quay Meadows	H	Won	10–3			
1903–04	Sat 12-03-1904	CC R1	Morecambe	Quay Meadows	H	Draw	0–0		4	
1903–04	Wed 16-03-1904	CC R1 Replay	Morecambe	Moss Lane	A	Won	13–4		4	
1903–04	Sat 19-03-1904	CC R2	Keighley	Quay Meadows	H	Lost	0–8			
1903–04	Wed 13-04-1904	2nd Div	St. Helens	Quay Meadows	H	Lost	2–12			
1903–04	Sat 23-04-1904	2nd Div	St. Helens	Knowsley Road	A	Lost	2–35			

== Notes and comments ==
1. Folly Fields is the stadium used by Wigan at the time until 1901. They then became sub-tenants of Springfield Park See below - Note 3.
2. Lowerhouse Lane is the original site of the current ground used by Widnes. It was renamed Naughton Park in 1932 in honour of club secretary, Tom Naughton - and later renamed Halton Stadium after being completely rebuilt in 1997.
3. Wigan became sub-tenants of Springfield Park, which they shared with Wigan United AFC, playing their first game there on 14 September 1901 at which a crowd of 4,000 saw them beat Morecambe 12–0, and the last game on 28 April 1902 when Wigan beat the Rest of Lancashire Senior Competition. A temporary ground was necessary to span the period between moving from Folly Fields and the new ground at Central Park being constructed.
4. The original "Origin" game took place during the 1903/4 Rugby League Challenge Cup competition, where the two local teams played out an unusual 0–0 draw at Quay Meadow, only to be followed in the replay by a Lancaster win of 13 points to 4 at Moss Lane in Morecambe, approximately where Morrisons supermarket now stands. Lancaster progressed to the second round of the Cup, where they were defeated 8 points to nil by Keighley at Quay Meadow.

== See also ==
- Jim Leytham
- John Pinch
- List of defunct rugby league clubs
