= Isaac Cole =

England international rugby league footballer

- Cole in 1906

Personal information
- Full name: Isaac Cole
- Born: 9 April 1886 Pontefract, England
- Died: 30 March 1940 (aged 53) Halifax, England

Playing information
- Weight: 13 st 10 lb (87 kg)

Rugby union
Club
Years	Team	Pld	T	G	FG	P
–Dec 1904	Castleford (incomplete)	2	2	1		8

Rugby league
- Position: Wing, Forwards
Club
Years	Team	Pld	T	G	FG	P
1904–06	Castleford	17	4	3		18
1906–10	Huddersfield	50	8	7		38
1910–13	Wakefield Trinity	19	2	0	0	6
1910–10	Castleford	2	0	0	0	0
1913–14	Keighley	32	1	1	0	5
1914–18	Others – World War I years (York/Halifax), Benefit (1919), Friendlies (Wakefield Trinity (1910)	7	0	0	0	0
	Total	127	15	11	0	67
Representative
Years	Team	Pld	T	G	FG	P
1905–06	Yorkshire	1	0	0	0	0
1905–06	Yorkshire trial games	2	0	0	0	0
1906	England	1	0	0	0	0

Isaac Cole (9 April 1886 – 30 March 1940) was a British rugby union and professional rugby league footballer who played in the 1900s and 1910s. He played club level rugby union (RU) for Castleford, and representative level rugby league (RL) for England and Yorkshire, and at club level for Castleford, Huddersfield, Wakefield Trinity, (York and Halifax during World War I) and Keighley playing mainly in the forwards, though occasionally on the Wing.

== Background ==
Cole was born in Pontefract, West Riding of Yorkshire, England, and he died aged 53 in Halifax, West Riding of Yorkshire, England.

== Playing career ==
=== Club career ===
Cole scored six tries playing on the wing for Huddersfield on 30 January 1907 in the 63–0 victory over Liverpool City. He played for Huddersfield in the 8–19 defeat by New Zealand on Saturday 12 October 1907.

Cole didn't play in Huddersfield's 21–0 victory over Batley in the 1909 Yorkshire Cup Final during the 1909–10 season at Headingley, Leeds on Saturday 27 November 1909, in front of a crowd of 22,000,

Upon signing for Wakefield Trinity on 1 February 1910, the game against Rochdale Hornets was cancelled due to the weather, resulting in them being unable to qualify him for the cup ties, although he did receive a Yorkshire League winners medal during the 1910–11 season.

In the benefit match played for Ernest Whitehouse, on 21 December 1919, Isaac Cole played for the defeated Billy Batten XIII versus Halifax by 6–16. Ernest Whitehouse was a World War I leg amputee who had played for Whitwood Melbourne (RU), Castleford (1912), been registered with Hull F.C. (28 January 1913 – 1916) and played for York and Halifax in 1917–18. The benefit match was the first rugby league game to be played at Wheldon Road, Castleford.

=== Representative honours ===
Cole won a cap for England (RL) while at Castleford in 1906 in the 3–3 draw with Other Nationalities on Monday 1 January 1906 at Central Park, Wigan.

This game was the last 15-a-side rugby league international to be played, and 'Cole at 19 years and eight months old, was thought to have been the youngest forward of either code to have played at international level up to that time'.

In Yorkshire trial games, Isaac Cole played for "The Stripes" in the 8–13 defeat by "The Whites" at Huddersfield on Monday 25 September 1905, and "The Possibles" in the 18–15 victory over "The Probables" at Hull on Tuesday 10 October 1905.

Cole won one cap for Yorkshire in the 0–8 defeat by Lancashire at Hull on Saturday 4 November 1905, while at Castleford.

He was also selected as reserve for Yorkshire against Cumberland for the game at Whitehaven on Saturday 13 January 1906.
