= Mel Ford =

Wales international rugby league footballer (1923–2000)

Personal information
- Full name: Melvyn Ford
- Born: 13 December 1923; Bedwellty district, Wales
- Died: 12 July 2000 (aged 76); Surrey, England

Playing information
- Position: Prop
Club
Years	Team	Pld	T	G	FG	P
≤1951–≥51	Aberavon RLFC
Representative
Years	Team	Pld	T	G	FG	P
1951	Wales	1

Melvyn Ford (13 December 1923 – 12 July 2000) was a Welsh professional rugby league footballer who played in the 1950s. He played at representative level for Wales, and at club level for Aberavon RLFC, as a prop.

== Background ==
Mel Ford was born in the Bedwellty district of Wales, on 13 December 1923. He died in Surrey on 12 July 2000, at the age of 76.

== International honours ==
Ford won a cap for Wales while at Aberavon 1951 1-cap.
