= Thomas Bryan (VC) =

English Victoria Cross recipient (1882–1945)

- Born: 21 January 1882; Stourbridge, Worcestershire
- Died: 13 October 1945 (aged 63); Bentley, Doncaster
- Burial place: Arksey Cemetery, Doncaster
- Military career
- Allegiance: United Kingdom
- Branch: British Army
- Service years: 1915–1918
- Rank: Lance corporal
- Service number: No. 22040
- Units: Northumberland Fusiliers
- Conflicts: World War I
- Awards: Victoria Cross
- Other work: Rugby league player
- Rugby league career

Playing information
Club
Years	Team	Pld	T	G	FG	P
1906–07	Castleford RFC

Thomas Bryan VC (21 January 1882 – 13 October 1945) was an English recipient of the Victoria Cross, the highest and most prestigious award for gallantry in the face of the enemy that can be awarded to British and Commonwealth forces.

== Early life ==
Bryan was born in Worcestershire, but grew up in Castleford, West Riding of Yorkshire, England. He moved as a toddler with his family who headed north to find work in the Yorkshire collieries. His father worked as a miner at the Whitwood Colliery. Byran followed his father into the mines working at Askern Colliery.

== VC action ==
Bryan was 35 years old, and a lance-corporal in the 25th (Service) Battalion (2nd Tyneside Irish), Northumberland Fusiliers, British Army during the First World War at the Battle of Arras when the following deed took place for which he was awarded the VC.

=== Citation ===
For most conspicuous bravery during an attack.

Although wounded, this Non-commissioned Officer went forward alone, with a view to silencing a machine gun which was inflicting much damage. He worked up most skilfully along a communication trench, approached the gun from behind, disabled it and killed two of the team as they were abandoning the gun.

As this machine gun had been a serious obstacle in the advance to the second objective, the results obtained by Lance-Corporal Bryan's gallant action were very far-reaching.

== Rugby league ==
Bryan played rugby league for Castleford RFC (unrelated to the Castleford Tigers) in the 1906–07 season, at the end of which the club withdrew from the Northern Union for financial reasons.

His VC is on display in the Lord Ashcroft Gallery at the Imperial War Museum, London. His grave is maintained by the Victoria Cross Trust

== Bibliography ==
- Gliddon, Gerald (2012). Arras and Messines 1917. VCs of the First World War. Stroud, Gloucestershire: The History Press. ISBN 978-0-7524-6604-0.
