= 1899–1900 Northern Rugby Football Union season =

- Structure: Separate county competitions

1899–1900 Season
- Top point-scorer(s): Sam Williams ( Oldham) 108
- Top try-scorer(s): Sam Williams ( Oldham) 36

Lancashire Senior Competition
- Champions: Runcorn
- Top point-scorer(s): Sam Williams ( Oldham) 108
- Top try-scorer(s): Sam Williams ( Oldham) 36

Promotion and relegation
- Promoted from Lancashire second competition: Barrow
- Relegated to Lancashire second competition: Tyldesley

Yorkshire Senior Competition
- Champions: Bradford
- Top point-scorer(s): Wattie Davies ( Batley) 107
- Top try-scorer(s): Wattie Davies ( Batley) 21

The 1899–1900 Northern Rugby Football Union season was the fifth season of rugby league football in England.

== Season summary ==
The Lancashire Senior Competition was won by Runcorn (from Cheshire) and the Yorkshire Senior Competition by Bradford.

Hull Kingston Rovers played their first season in the Northern Rugby Union this season. Their first match away at Bradford on 2 September ended in a 3-0 defeat.

== Lancashire Senior Competition ==
Millom replaced Morecambe. Although participating in the Lancashire Senior Competition, Runcorn and Stockport were from Cheshire, and Millom were from Cumberland. Runcorn won the competition and Tyldesley were relegated after finishing bottom of the league and losing the promotion/relegation match 22–8 to Barrow.

| | Team | Pld | W | D | L | PF | PA | Pts |
|---|---|---|---|---|---|---|---|---|
| 1 | Runcorn | 26 | 22 | 2 | 2 | 232 | 33 | 46 |
| 2 | Oldham | 26 | 21 | 1 | 4 | 343 | 75 | 43 |
| 3 | Swinton | 26 | 19 | 1 | 6 | 210 | 108 | 39 |
| 4 | St. Helens | 26 | 16 | 3 | 7 | 207 | 119 | 35 |
| 5 | Widnes | 26 | 12 | 4 | 10 | 174 | 146 | 28 |
| 6 | Warrington | 26 | 12 | 1 | 13 | 174 | 128 | 25 |
| 7 | Broughton Rangers | 26 | 13 | 1 | 12 | 132 | 138 | 25 (Note: Two league points deducted for breach of professional rules.) |
| 8 | Salford | 26 | 12 | 0 | 14 | 196 | 176 | 24 |
| 9 | Stockport | 26 | 10 | 2 | 14 | 126 | 136 | 22 |
| 10 | Leigh | 26 | 8 | 5 | 13 | 119 | 211 | 21 |
| 11 | Rochdale Hornets | 26 | 9 | 1 | 16 | 90 | 181 | 17 |
| 12 | Millom | 26 | 7 | 1 | 18 | 112 | 234 | 15 |
| 13 | Wigan | 26 | 7 | 1 | 18 | 70 | 230 | 15 |
| 14 | Tyldesley | 26 | 2 | 1 | 23 | 66 | 336 | 5 |

== Yorkshire Senior Competition ==
Bradford won the competition. There was no promotion or relegation as Liversedge won the promotion/relegation test match against Heckmondwike 11–2.

| | Team | Pld | W | D | L | PF | PA | Pts |
|---|---|---|---|---|---|---|---|---|
| 1 | Bradford | 30 | 24 | 2 | 4 | 324 | 98 | 50 |
| 2 | Batley | 30 | 21 | 6 | 3 | 219 | 72 | 48 |
| 3 | Halifax | 30 | 20 | 3 | 7 | 193 | 120 | 43 |
| 4 | Wakefield Trinity | 30 | 18 | 5 | 7 | 203 | 120 | 41 |
| 5 | Huddersfield | 30 | 17 | 4 | 9 | 181 | 110 | 38 |
| 6 | Hull Kingston Rovers | 30 | 15 | 4 | 11 | 181 | 129 | 32 (Note: Two league points deducted for breach of professional rules.) |
| 7 | Hull | 30 | 15 | 0 | 15 | 249 | 154 | 30 |
| 8 | Hunslet | 30 | 14 | 2 | 14 | 182 | 168 | 30 |
| 9 | Manningham | 30 | 13 | 3 | 14 | 207 | 203 | 29 |
| 10 | Bramley | 30 | 13 | 0 | 17 | 121 | 190 | 26 |
| 11 | Castleford | 30 | 11 | 3 | 16 | 155 | 199 | 25 |
| 12 | Brighouse Rangers | 30 | 9 | 3 | 18 | 80 | 231 | 21 |
| 13 | Holbeck | 30 | 8 | 4 | 18 | 138 | 236 | 18 |
| 14 | Leeds Parish Church | 30 | 7 | 3 | 20 | 135 | 207 | 17 |
| 15 | Leeds | 30 | 7 | 3 | 20 | 103 | 225 | 17 |
| 16 | Liversedge | 30 | 5 | 1 | 24 | 94 | 303 | 11 |

== Challenge Cup ==
Swinton beat Salford 16-8 in the Challenge Cup Final at Fallowfield Stadium, Manchester played before a crowd of 17,864.
