= Leeds Parish Church RFC =

English rugby league club based in Leeds, West Yorkshire

Leeds Parish Church
- Full name: Leeds Parish Church Football Club
- Founded: 1874; 152 years ago
- Disbanded: 1901; 125 years ago
- Location: Leeds, Yorkshire, England
- Ground: Clarence Field
- Chairman: B. Pickett/J. Milburn
Team kit

Leeds Parish Church RFC was a semi-professional rugby league club based in Leeds, West Yorkshire, England. The club played semi-professional rugby league for a total of five seasons from 1896–97 to 1900–01. Each of the five seasons was spent in the Yorkshire Senior Competition. At the end of season 1900–01 the club withdrew from the league.

== History ==
=== Early days ===
Leeds Parish Church Rugby Club was formed many years before the "Great Schism" of 1895.

As the game's popularity increased and travel became easier due to the expansion of the railway network, Neath from South Wales embarked on Northern Tours. In 1887–88 a tour led them to play against Wortley (Leeds), Manningham (Bradford) and Hartlepool Rovers. In 1888–89 over the Christmas period they played games against Leeds Parish Church, Bramley, Radcliffe, Brighouse Rangers and Huddersfield, all within the space of six days.

The city of Leeds had an abundance of rugby football clubs and although members of the Yorkshire RFU (which was in turn a Constituent Body of the RFU), it was decided to form a 'more local' association. It was for this reason that the Leeds & District organization was formalised when a meeting took place at the Green Dragon Hotel, Leeds on 27 September 1888. The foundation clubs were Bramley, Holbeck, Hunslet, Kirkstall, Leeds Parish Church, Leeds St John's (later to become Leeds (Rhinos), and Wortley.

In the early years of the sport, the Church elders and officials saw the development of its rugby football team as an attempt to stem the tide of drinking and depravity which they saw all around them in the city. The irony of their "muscular Christianity" mission was that large numbers of its rugby team's supporters were the newly arrived Jews who had been confined to the poorest areas like around the Leylands, near the city centre. They were not muscular, unloved by many Christians and condemned by their own religious leaders for breaking Shabbat. But they felt that it was a way to join in the life of the city.

A photograph of the Leeds Parish Church of 1893 is shown on the "Gallery" section of "The Goldthorpe Brothers" website.

=== Northern Union ===
In 1896, at a special meeting, Leeds Parish Church RFC, that season's Yorkshire RFU champions, had only five votes against their switch of allegiance to the Northern Union. At the same time, most of the clubs who had played in the Yorkshire RFU 1st Division resigned. The following Summer most of the remaining 1st and 2nd Division teams resigned en bloc to form the second division of the Yorkshire Northern Rugby Union.

By June 1897 there were no rugby union clubs in the Halifax district RFU, the Bradford and Huddersfield district rugby unions voted to change affiliation to the Northern Union, and by the start of the following season the Yorkshire Post reported that "in Leeds, rugby union football is practically non-existent".

They joined the ranks of the semi-professionals when they became members of the Northern Union in its second season 1896–97 and played for the following four season in the Yorkshire Senior Competition, which was effectively Division 2 (East).

In this first season Leeds Parish Church RFC managed only a lowly 13th place out of 16 clubs, but this was one position above their fierce rivals Leeds.

In the club's second season 1897–98 they improved to a mid-table 8th out of 16 clubs, but, for the only time below Leeds.

The third season 1898–99 was their best when they excelled and finished 4th out of 16 clubs, whilst Leeds finished in 11th places.

In 1899–1900 the club slipped back finishing 14th out of 16, but still one place above Leeds.

And a slightly better position was reached in the final season 1900–01 when they finished in 10th place out of 16, this time three places above Leeds. Leeds Parish Church RFC dropped out of the league after the end of the season.

Only once in the five seasons did Leeds Parish Church RFC finish below Leeds, only once below Bramley but conversely only once did they finish above Hunslet.

In the early days, the club had been looked upon by the elders as a flagship of muscular Christianity, which the Jewish community had become passionately involved in.

It was closed down because of its rough play, attacking referees, a violent crowd (echoes of worldwide Association Football in the late 20th century) – but also, it has been suggested – because it attracted the Jewish working-class community.

== Colours ==
The club's original colours were blue and black. After 1886 the club changed its jerseys to white but were back to blue and black by 1889.

== Stadium ==
The club's stadium was on Clarence Field at Crown Point.

== Club League Record ==
The league positions for Leeds Parish Church RFC for the 5 seasons in which they played (semi) professional Rugby League are given in the following table:

Season	Competition	Pos	Team Name	Pl	W	D	L	PW	PA	Diff	Pts	% Pts	No of teams in league	Notes	Ref
1896–97	Yorks Sen Comp	13	Leeds Parish Church	30	9	4	17	129	162	-33	22		16		
1897–98	Yorks Sen Comp	8	Leeds Parish Church	30	15	1	14	187	213	-26	31		16		
1898–99	Yorks Sen Comp	4	Leeds Parish Church	30	20	2	8	201	114	87	42		16		
1899–1900	Yorks Sen Comp	14	Leeds Parish Church	30	7	3	20	135	207	-42	17		16		
1900–01	Yorks Sen Comp	10	Leeds Parish Church	30	12	6	12	115	108	7	30		16		

Heading Abbreviations
RL = Single Division; Pl = Games played; W = Win; D = Draw; L = Lose; PF = Points for; PA = Points against; Diff = Points difference (+ or -); Pts = League points
% Pts = A percentage system was used to determine league positions due to clubs playing varying number of fixtures and against different opponents
League points: for win = 2; for draw = 1; for loss = 0.

== Several fixtures & results ==
The following are just a few of Leeds Parish Church RFC fixtures during the three seasons (and other times) in which they played semi-professional rugby league:

Season	Date	Competition	Opponent	Venue	H/A	Result	Score	Att	Notes	Ref
1896–97	Sat 21-11-1896	Yorks Sen Comp	Hull	Clarence Road	H	Draw	5-5			
1896–97	Sat 27–02-1897	Yorks Sen Comp	Hull	The Boulevard	A	Lost	3–9			
1897–98	Sat 04–09-1897	Yorks Sen Comp	Hull	Clarence Road	H	Won	13-3			
1897–98	Sat 16–04-1898	Yorks Sen Comp	Hull	The Boulevard	A	Lost	2-26			
1898–99	Sat 15-10-1898	Yorks Sen Comp	Hull	Clarence Road	H	Won	13-2			
1897–98	Sat 18-12-1898	Yorks Sen Comp	Hull	The Boulevard	A	Lost	2-10			
1898–99	Sat 21–01-1899	Yorks Sen Comp	Hull	The Boulevard	A	Lost	0-14			
1899–1900	Wed 10–01-1900	Yorks Sen Comp	Hull	Clarence Road	H	Lost	2-5			
1899–1900	Sat 24–02-1900	Yorks Sen Comp	Hull	The Boulevard	A	Lost	0-8			
1900–01	Sat 13-10-1900	Yorks Sen Comp	Hull	Clarence Road	H	Lost	0-6			
1900–01	Sat 03-11-1900	Yorks Sen Comp	Hull	The Boulevard	A	Lost	0-31			
1900–01	Sat 19–01-1901	Yorks Sen Comp	Hull	The Boulevard	A	Lost	0-5			
1900–01	23–03-1901	CC R3	Warrington	Wilderspool Stadium	A	Lost	0-11			

== Notable players ==
- John Wilkinson Birch

== See also ==
- Rugby league county leagues
- List of defunct rugby league clubs
