= Roy Lambert (rugby league) =

Wales international rugby league footballer

Personal information
- Full name: Roy Lambert
- Born: Wales

Playing information
- Position: Wing
Club
Years	Team	Pld	T	G	FG	P
≤1950–50	Neath RLFC
1950–51	Dewsbury	41	26	0	0	78
1951–52	Warrington	38	25	0	0	75
1952–54	Castleford	26	14	0	1	44
1954–	→Wigan (loan)	1	0	0	0	0
	Total	106	65	0	1	197
Representative
Years	Team	Pld	T	G	FG	P
1950–52	Wales	7	1	0	0	3

Roy Lambert (birth unknown) is a Welsh former professional rugby league footballer who played in the 1950s. He played at representative level for Wales, and at club level for Neath RLFC, Dewsbury, Warrington, Castleford and Wigan, as a wing.

== Playing career ==
=== International honours ===
Lambert won 7 caps for Wales in 1950–1952 while at Neath, Dewsbury, and Warrington.

=== Club career ===
Lambert signed for Warrington from Dewsbury in December 1951 for a fee of £2,500. Lambert's only Wigan appearance was the 16–6 victory over Hunslet at Central Park, Wigan on Saturday 21 August 1954. He was on loan from Castleford.
