= 1898–99 Northern Rugby Football Union season =

- Structure: Separate county championships

1898–99 Season
- Top point-scorer(s): Billy Jaques ( Hull F.C.) 169
- Top try-scorer(s): Sam Williams ( Oldham) 39

Lancashire Senior Competition
- Champions: Broughton Rangers
- Top try-scorer(s): Sam Williams ( Oldham) 39

Promotion and relegation
- Promoted from Lancashire second competition: Millom
- Relegated to Lancashire second competition: Morecambe

Yorkshire Senior Competition
- Champions: Batley
- Top try-scorer(s): Cyril Lemprière ( Hull F.C.) 24

Promotion and relegation
- Promoted from Yorkshire No. 2 competition: Hull Kingston Rovers
- Relegated to Yorkshire No. 2 competition: Heckmondwike

The 1897–98 Northern Rugby Football Union season was the fourth season of rugby league football.

== Season summary ==
The Lancashire Senior Competition was won by Broughton Rangers and the Yorkshire Senior Competition by Batley.

== Lancashire Senior Competition ==
Although participating in the Lancashire Senior Competition, Runcorn and Stockport were from Cheshire. Champions Broughton Rangers beat a team representing the rest of the Lancashire competition 5–3 in an end of season finale on 22 April 1899. Morecambe finished bottom of the competition and lost the promotion/relegation test match to Millom - winners of the Lancashire second competition - by 11 points to 3. Millom were admitted to the Senior Competition and Morecambe were admitted to the second competition.

	Team	Pld	W	D	L	PF	PA	Pts
1	Broughton Rangers	26	21	0	5	277	74	42
2	Oldham	26	20	0	6	385	58	40
3	Salford	26	18	2	6	206	113	38
4	Widnes	26	17	2	7	196	113	36
5	Leigh	26	17	0	9	168	125	34
6	Swinton	26	16	2	8	228	79	32 (Note: Swinton had 2 points deducted for a breach of the professional rules.)
7	Runcorn	26	15	2	9	193	113	32
8	St. Helens	26	12	3	11	168	18	27
9	Warrington	26	11	1	14	134	217	23
10	Rochdale Hornets	26	9	3	14	112	216	21
11	Stockport	26	5	1	20	102	317	11
12	Tyldesley	26	3	5	18	82	240	11
13	Wigan	26	4	2	20	66	238	10
14	Morecambe	26	2	1	23	47	281	5

== Yorkshire Senior Competition ==
Champions Batley played a team representing the rest of the Yorkshire competition at Mount Pleasant on 22 April 1899 with Batley winning 3–0. The promotion/relegation test match was contested by Heckmondwike who finished bottom of the competition and Hull Kingston Rovers, winners of the no.2 competition. Hull Kingston Rovers won the match 21–3 to take Heckmondwike's place.

	Team	Pld	W	D	L	PF	PA	Diff	Pts
1	Batley	30	23	2	5	279	75	204	48
2	Hull	30	23	1	6	429	101	328	47
3	Bradford	30	21	0	9	330	139	191	42
4	Leeds Parish Church	30	20	2	8	201	114	87	42
5	Hunslet	30	16	5	9	314	140	174	37
6	Huddersfield	30	15	3	12	169	147	22	33
7	Manningham	30	15	2	13	222	212	10	30 (Note: Manningham had 2 points deducted for a breach of the professional rules.)
8	Halifax	30	15	0	15	156	158	2	30
9	Wakefield Trinity	30	11	6	13	209	61	48	28
10	Brighouse Rangers	30	12	2	16	114	191	77	26
11	Leeds	30	11	3	16	127	186	59	27
12	Castleford	30	10	4	16	159	214	55	24
13	Holbeck	30	10	4	16	134	220	86	24
14	Bramley	30	7	3	20	62	266	204	17
15	Liversedge	30	5	3	22	131	439	308	13
16	Heckmondwike	30	4	4	22	70	343	273	12
