= 1902–03 Northern Rugby Football Union season =

- League: Championship
- Duration: 34 Rounds
- Teams: First Division: 18; Second Division: 18

First Division
- Champions: Halifax (1st title)
- Runners-up: Salford
- Top point-scorer: (Wales) Wharton Davies (Batley) (136)

Promotion and relegation
- Relegated to Second Division: St Helens; Brighouse Rangers

Second Division
- Champions: Keighley
- Top point-scorer: Evans (27)

Promotion and relegation
- Promoted from Second Division: Keighley; Leeds
- Resigned from the League: Manningham; Stockport

The 1902–03 Northern Rugby Football Union season was the eighth season of rugby league football.

== Season summary ==
=== Overview ===
League Champions: Halifax

Challenge Cup Winners: Halifax (7-0 v Salford)

2nd Division Champions: Keighley

=== Summary ===
- Four of the top five clubs from the 1901–02 Lancashire Senior Competition; Hull Kingston Rovers (although based in Yorkshire, and having played in the Yorkshire Senior Competition for the 1899–1900 and 1900–01 seasons, they had played the 1901–02 season in the Lancashire Senior Competition), St. Helens, Widnes, and Wigan joined the 14-clubs from the previous season's 1901–02 Northern Rugby League to make an 18-club Division 1, the exception was Barrow who despite finishing fourth in the 1901–02 Lancashire Senior Competition joined Division 2.

At the end of the season Manningham Rugby Club decided to switch to association football and became Bradford City A.F.C., whilst staying at Valley Parade.

== Tables ==
=== First Division ===
Pos	Team	Pld	W	D	L	PF	PA	PAv	Pts	Relegation
1	Halifax (C)	34	23	3	8	199	85	2.341	49	
2	Salford	34	20	5	9	244	130	1.877	45	
3	Swinton	34	18	7	9	254	119	2.134	43	
4	Runcorn	34	19	4	11	239	139	1.719	42	
5	Broughton Rangers	34	17	7	10	222	97	2.289	41	
6	Oldham	34	20	0	14	200	128	1.563	40	
7	Bradford F.C.	34	16	5	13	220	161	1.366	37	
8	Warrington	34	14	7	13	148	164	0.902	35	
9	Hunslet	34	16	3	15	185	220	0.841	35	
10	Hull F.C.	34	16	2	16	204	192	1.063	34	
11	Batley	34	15	4	15	176	214	0.822	34	
12	Leigh	34	12	5	17	136	178	0.764	29	
13	Widnes	34	13	2	19	131	167	0.784	28	
14	Hull Kingston Rovers	34	13	2	19	155	215	0.721	28	
15	Huddersfield	34	13	2	19	116	196	0.592	28	
16	Wigan	34	10	6	18	125	174	0.718	26	
17	St Helens (R)	34	9	2	23	125	309	0.405	20	Relegation to Second Division
18	Brighouse Rangers (R)	34	7	4	23	79	270	0.293	18	Relegation to Second Division

Rules for classification: 1) Points; 2) Points difference; 3) Number of points scored;
(C) Champions; (R) Relegated

=== Second Division ===
Pos	Team	Pld	W	D	L	PF	PA	PAv	Pts	Promotion
1	Keighley (C, P)	34	27	2	5	270	92	2.935	56	Promoted to First Division
2	Leeds (P)	34	26	1	7	334	98	3.408	53	Promoted to First Division
3	Millom	34	22	3	9	238	118	2.017	47	
4	Rochdale Hornets	34	20	6	8	323	88	3.670	46	
5	Holbeck	34	20	5	9	213	83	2.566	45	
6	Barrow	34	22	0	12	230	140	1.643	44	
7	Wakefield Trinity	34	18	2	14	263	196	1.342	38	
8	Bramley	34	16	4	14	179	151	1.185	36	
9	Birkenhead Wanderers	34	14	6	14	125	140	0.893	34	
10	Manningham	34	14	5	15	141	170	0.829	33	
11	Lancaster	34	13	4	17	123	214	0.575	30	
12	Normanton	34	12	4	18	160	228	0.702	28	
13	York	34	11	4	19	111	190	0.584	26	
14	South Shields	34	10	2	22	158	264	0.598	22	
15	Castleford	34	9	4	21	105	268	0.392	22	
16	Dewsbury	34	8	5	21	123	245	0.502	21	
17	Morecambe	34	9	2	23	88	220	0.400	20	
18	Stockport	34	5	1	28	69	348	0.198	11	

Rules for classification: 1) Points; 2) Points difference; 3) Number of points scored;
(C) Champions; (P) Promoted

== Challenge Cup ==
Halifax beat Salford 7-0 in the final at Leeds before a crowd of 32,507

== Sources ==
- 1902-03 Rugby Football League season at wigan.rlfans.com
- The Challenge Cup at The Rugby Football League website
