= Heckmondwike RFC =

Defunct English semi-professional rugby league club

Heckmondwike FC
Club information
- Full name: Heckmondwike FC
- Exited: 1903; 123 years ago

Former details
- Ground: Beck Lane

Uniforms
Home colours

Heckmondwike was a semi-professional rugby league club based in Heckmondwike in the metropolitan borough of Kirklees, West Yorkshire, England.

The club played semi-professional rugby league for a total of 4 seasons and spent each of the seasons in the Yorkshire Senior Competition. They first became members of the Northern Rugby Football Union (now Rugby Football League) in 1896–97 and stayed for three seasons until 1898–99. After a two-year sojourn in the Yorkshire Second Competition, they returned to the Northern Rugby Football Union's Yorkshire Senior Competition in 1901–02 for a further single season.

At the end of the 1901–02 season the club left the league and changed sports to soccer.

== History ==
=== Early Days ===
Heckmondwike FC was formed as a rugby football club some time before 1895. They converted from the rugby union to rugby league in the summer of 1896, in time for the 1896–97 season.

During the early years the club had three prominent players who gained international caps: Dicky Lockwood, Donald Jowett, and Willie Sutcliffe.

They joined the ranks of the semi-professionals when they became members of the Northern Union in its second season 1896–97 and played in the Yorkshire Senior Competition. At the end of this first season, 1896–97, Heckmondwike finished in bottom place out of the 16 clubs..

In the second season, 1897–98 the club did very little better, finishing 15th out of 16 clubs, despite the signing of the former England (RU) and Bradford F.C. Half-back, Horace Duckett.

They slipped back to bottom position out of 16 in the third season, 1898–99. Heckmondwike hen spent two seasons playing in the Yorkshire Second Competition.

With the formation of the Northern Rugby League in 1901 Heckmondwike returned to the Yorkshire Senior Competition for the start of the 1901–02 and finished in 11th place out of 14 clubs.

A further re-organisation of the league took place in 1902 when 18 teams from the Lancashire and Yorkshire Senior Competitions were elected to a new Northern Rugby League Division 2. Heckmondwike were not one of the teams elected and remained in the Yorkshire Senior Competition, which decided to continue as a junior league. At the end of 1902–03, the club were suspended from the competition due to non-payment of subscriptions.

The club left the Northern Union shortly after and were replaced by an association football club.

== Colours ==
The club wore black and white jerseys, which were, unusually for a rugby team, in vertical stripes.

== Ground ==
The club played at Beck Lane, and originally used the Sir Robert Peel inn for facilities.

== Club league record ==
The league positions for Heckmondwike for the four seasons in which they played semi-professional rugby league are given in the following table:

Season	Competition	Pos	Team Name	Pl	W	D	L	PW	PA	Diff	Pts	No of teams in league	Notes	Ref
1896–97	Yorks Sen Comp	16	Heckmondwike	30	3	4	23	72	308	-236	10	16		
1897–98	Yorks Sen Comp	15	Heckmondwike	30	9	2	19	148	315	-167	20	16		
1898–99	Yorks Sen Comp	16	Heckmondwike	30	4	4	22	70	343	-273	12	16		
1899–1900		Heckmondwike not in semi-professional leagues.												
1900–01		Heckmondwike not in semi-professional leagues.												
1901–02	Yorks Sen Comp	11	Heckmondwike	26	7	3	16	83	227	-144	17	14		

Heading Abbreviations
RL = Single division; Pl = Games played; W = Win; D = Draw; L = Lose; PF = Points for; PA = Points against; Diff = Points difference (+ or -); Pts = League points
League points: for win = 2; for draw = 1; for loss = 0.

== Notable players ==
J. Bland of Heckmondwike played in The Rest's 5-7 defeat by Leeds in the 1901–02 Yorkshire Senior Competition Champions versus The Rest match at Headingley Stadium on Saturday 19 April 1902.

== See also ==
- List of defunct rugby league clubs
