= Goole (rugby league) =

English amateur rugby league club

Club information
- Nickname: The Seaporters
- Founded: 1879
- Exited: 1902

Former details
- Ground: Victoria Pleasure Grounds Carter Street, Goole

Goole was a semi-professional rugby league club based in Goole, Yorkshire, England. Originally a rugby union club, the club joined the ranks of the Northern Union in 1898.

== History ==
Goole was formed as a rugby union club in 1879. In 1893 Goole caused one of the biggest shocks in Rugby history when they knocked Leeds out of the Yorkshire Cup in the second round by 15 points to 2. Leeds had been finalists in T'Owd Tin Pot in the previous year and had their best team out against Goole.

In January 1898 Goole RUFC were ordered by the governing body of rugby union, the RFU, not to play a charity rugby match against a touring Little Red Riding Hood pantomime troupe; this was deemed to be an act of professionalism because earlier on its tour the troupe had played in a charity match with Batley, members of the Northern Union. Very shortly after that Goole RUFC changed code and joined the Northern Union.

The same year together with Eastmoor, Featherstone, Hull Kingston Rovers, Kinsley, Normanton, Outwood Parish Church, Ripon, Rothwell, and York, were among the founders of the Yorkshire Second Competition (Eastern Section).

After two seasons in the Yorkshire Second Competition the club was elected into the Yorkshire Senior Competition for the 1901–02 season. Finishing third from bottom of the Yorkshire Senior Competition the club failed to be elected to the new Northern Rugby League Second Division. At the club's annual general meeting in August the members voted to disband the club as it would be too costly to continue as a professional team and raising an amateur team would be difficult, the resignation from the Northern Union being accepted on 28 August 1902.

== Colours ==
The club originally played in red, black, and yellow, but by 1888 was wearing chocolate and white.

== Ground ==
The club originally played on St John Street, originally using the Sidney Hotel for facilities; in 1883 it switched to the North-Eastern Hotel. By 1888 it had moved to the Recreation Ground. It later played at the Victoria Pleasure Grounds on Carter Street.

== Successor clubs ==
An amateur team from the town played in the 1936–37 Challenge Cup losing 14–2 at home to Broughton Rangers. This team disbanded in 1938.

On 10 November 2018 a committee was formed at the Victoria Pleasure Grounds and rugby league was again brought back to go with the formation of a new team, The Goole Vikings Amateur Rugby League Football Club, who have retained the historic nickname from the early 1900s The Seaporters

The Vikings play in the Yorkshire Men's League governed by York & District Rugby League. Their home ground is the Victoria Pleasure Grounds.

== league record ==
The clubs record in its single season in the Yorkshire Senior Competition was:

| Season | Competition | Pos | Team Name | Pl | W | D | L | PF | PA | PD | Pts | No of Teams |
|---|---|---|---|---|---|---|---|---|---|---|---|---|
| 1901–02 | Yorks Senior | 12 | Goole | 26 | 5 | 3 | 18 | 94 | 228 | -134 | 12 | 14 |

== Notable players ==
W. T. Greensitt of Goole played in The Rest's 7–5 defeat by Leeds in the 1901–02 Yorkshire Senior Competition Champions versus The Rest match at Headingley Stadium on Saturday 19 April 1902.

== See also ==
- The Great Schism – Rugby League View
- The Great Schism – Rugby Union View
- List of defunct rugby league clubs
