= Radcliffe RFC =

Defunct English semi-professional rugby league club

Club information
- Full name: Radcliffe RFC
- Founded: 1901; 124 years ago
- Exited: 1902; 123 years ago

Radcliffe was a semi-professional rugby league club based in Radcliffe, a town within the Metropolitan Borough of Bury, in Greater Manchester, England.

The club joined the Northern Union in 1901–02 and played for the single season in the Lancashire Senior Competition, which was effectively Division 2 (West).

== History ==
The club had been founded in 1875 as Radcliffe Close Wesleyan FC. In 1896 the club joined the Northern Union playing in the Lancashire Second Competition . The club played in the inaugural Challenge Cup competition losing 3–0 away to Wigan in the first round. The following year they entered the second Challenge Cup competition and lost again in the first round, this time away to Hull F.C. at the Boulevard by 19 points to nil.

At the end of the 1900–01 season the club was promoted to the Lancashire Senior Competition but finished bottom on the competition and were not elected to the new second division of the Northern Rugby League at which time the club left the Northern Union.

== Colours ==
The club's colours were amber and black.

== Club league record ==
In the single season in which Radcliffe played semi-professional rugby league, 1901–02, the team only managed two wins and a draw out of 24 games played.

Season	Competition	Pos	Team Name	Pl	W	D	L	PF	PA	Diff	Pts	No of teams in league	Notes	Ref
1901–02	Lancs Senior	13	Radcliffe	24	2	1	21	58	534	-476	3 (Note: Club deducted 2 points during the season for breach of the professional rules)	13		

Heading Abbreviations
RL = Single Division; Pl = Games played; W = Win; D = Draw; L = Lose; PF = Points for; PA = Points against; Diff = Points difference (+ or -); Pts = League points
League points: for win = 2; for draw = 1; for loss = 0.

== See also ==
- British rugby league system
- Rugby league county leagues
- List of defunct rugby league clubs
