= 1903–04 Northern Rugby Football Union season =

- League: Championship
- Teams: First Division: 18; Second Division: 17

First Division
- Champions: Bradford F.C. (1st title)
- Runners-up: Salford
- Top point-scorer: (England) James Lomas (Salford) (222)
- Top try-scorer: (Scotland) Andrew Hogg (Broughton Rangers) (34)

Second Division
- Champions: Wakefield Trinity

Promotion and relegation
- Promoted from Second Division: Wakefield Trinity; St Helens
- Joined the League: Pontefract

The 1903–04 Northern Rugby Football Union season was the ninth season of rugby league football.

== Season summary ==
The League Champions were Bradford and the Challenge Cup Winners were Halifax.

Keighley and Huddersfield were demoted from the top division and replaced by Wakefield Trinity (champions) and St. Helens.

As the top two teams had finished level on points and Points Difference had not been introduced as a tie breaker yet, despite having a worse points difference, Bradford contested a play-off with Salford, that Bradford won 5-0.

In the Second Division, Manningham and Stockport were replaced by Pontefract, reducing the competition to 17 teams. Birkenhead Wanderers dropped the Wanderers from their name.

The second promotion place had to be decided by a play-off as Points Difference had not yet been introduced as a tie breaker. St. Helens beat Holbeck 7-0.

There was no county league competition this season.

== Tables ==
=== First Division ===
Pos	Team	Pld	W	D	L	PF	PA	PAv	Pts	Qualification
1	Bradford (C)	34	25	2	7	303	96	3.156	52	Championship Playoff
2	Salford	34	25	2	7	366	108	3.389	52	Championship Playoff
3	Broughton Rangers	34	21	4	9	306	142	2.155	46	
4	Hunslet	34	22	1	11	250	157	1.592	45	
5	Oldham	34	20	3	11	215	110	1.955	43	
6	Leeds	34	19	5	10	211	145	1.455	43	
7	Warrington	34	17	3	14	214	153	1.399	37	
8	Hull Kingston Rovers	34	17	2	15	191	167	1.144	36	
9	Halifax	34	14	3	17	125	148	0.845	31	
10	Wigan	34	11	6	17	177	174	1.017	28	
11	Swinton	34	12	4	18	139	215	0.647	28	
12	Batley	34	12	3	19	139	241	0.577	27	
13	Hull F.C.	34	12	3	19	148	258	0.574	27	
14	Widnes	34	11	5	18	126	243	0.519	27	
15	Leigh	34	10	5	19	174	250	0.696	25	
16	Runcorn	34	11	2	21	151	245	0.616	24	
17	Keighley (R)	34	8	5	21	129	319	0.404	21	Relegation to Second Division
18	Huddersfield (R)	34	10	0	24	160	353	0.453	20	Relegation to Second Division

Updated to match(es) played on unknown. Source:
Rules for classification: 1) Points; 2) Points difference; 3) Number of points scored;
(C) Champions; (R) Relegated

==== Championship play-off ====
Bradford 5-0 Salford

=== Second Division ===
Pos	Team	Pld	W	D	L	PF	PA	PAv	Pts	Promotion
1	Wakefield Trinity (C, P)	32	27	1	4	389	57	6.825	55	Promoted to First Division
2	St. Helens (P)	32	23	3	6	328	105	3.124	49	Playoff
3	Holbeck	32	24	1	7	256	120	2.133	49	Playoff
4	Rochdale Hornets	32	22	2	8	319	104	3.067	46	
5	York	32	20	1	11	244	97	2.515	41	
6	Brighouse Rangers	32	19	3	10	192	136	1.412	41	
7	Castleford	32	18	3	11	185	194	0.954	39	
8	Bramley	32	16	4	12	181	180	1.006	36	
9	Barrow	32	16	3	13	219	162	1.352	35	
10	Pontefract	32	14	6	12	174	150	1.160	34	
11	Dewsbury	32	12	3	17	185	205	0.902	27	
12	Millom	32	12	2	18	185	209	0.885	26	
13	Lancaster	32	8	2	22	129	291	0.443	18	
14	Birkenhead	32	7	0	25	75	334	0.225	14	
15	South Shields	32	6	1	25	140	336	0.417	13	
16	Morecambe	32	5	3	24	72	287	0.251	13	
17	Normanton	32	4	0	28	105	411	0.255	8	

Updated to match(es) played on unknown. Source:
Rules for classification: 1) Points; 2) Points difference; 3) Number of points scored;
(C) Champions; (P) Promoted

==== Promotion play-off ====
St. Helens 7-0 Holbeck

== Challenge Cup ==
Halifax beat Warrington 8-3 in the final at Salford's The Willows before a paying crowd of 17,041, plus 1,000 additional guests, to become the second team to record back-to-back Cup wins. Halifax wouldn’t reach another final until 1921 nor win the Cup again until 1931.

== Internationals ==
On 5 April 1904, the first ever International Rugby League match took place between England and Other Nationalities. It was played at Central Park, Wigan, having originally been scheduled for New Year's Day in Oldham. England lost 3-9 in a twelve sided match, with the opposition made up of ten Welshmen and two Scots. The crowd numbered just 6,000.

=== Teams ===
England	Other Nationalities
Full back	Full back
W.B. Little	D. Smith
Three Quarters	Three Quarters
F. Spottiswoode	D. Thomas
G. Dickenson	T.D. Llewellyn
J. Lomas	D. Harris
J. Fish	D.J. Lewis
Half backs	Half backs
J. Baxter	E. Davies
J. Morely	P.J. Brady
Forwards	Forwards
A. Starks [c]	J. Rhapps
P. Tunney	J.G. Moffatt
J. Riley	G. Frater [c]
J.W. Bulmer	D. Thomas
J. Ferguson	H. Buckler

== Sources ==
- 1903-04 Rugby Football League season at wigan.rlfans.com
- The Challenge Cup at The Rugby Football League website
