= Sowerby Bridge (rugby league) =

Defunct English rugby league club, based in West Yorkshire

Sowerby Bridge was a (semi) professional rugby league club.

The club was based in Sowerby Bridge, a small market town (population approx. 10,000) that lies within the Upper Calder Valley in the district of Calderdale in West Yorkshire, northern England, and approximately 3 miles from Halifax.

The club joined the Northern Union in 1901-02 and played for the single season in the Yorkshire Senior Competition.

== History ==
Sowerby Bridge rugby club was formed in the mid-1880s. In April 1899 the club won the Yorkshire Cup beating Alverthorpe 4–0 in a replay after the first game ended 0–0. Just four months later, the club changed codes to join the Northern Union and was elected to the Yorkshire Second Competition. The following season the team was promoted to the Yorkshire Senior Competition but finished 13th out of 14 in the competition with just seven wins from 26 games.

At the end of the 1901-02 season, the County Leagues elected 18 teams to join the new Northern Rugby League Second Division. Sowerby Bridge did not apply to be in the new second division. After spending the following season in the Yorkshire Senior Competition, now reduced to the third-tier of the sport, the club left the Northern Union in July 1903 and the club folded soon after.

== Colours ==
The club's colours were amber and black.

== League record ==
In the single season in which Sowerby Bridge played professional rugby league the club played 26 games winning just 7 and having 2 points deducted for breaches of the professional rules.

Season	Competition	Pos	Team Name	Pl	W	D	L	PF	PA	Diff	Pts	No of teams in league	Ref
1901-02	Yorks Senior	13	Sowerby Bridge	26	7	0	19	65	179	-114	12	14	

Heading Abbreviations
RL = Single Division; Pl = Games played; W = Win; D = Draw; L = Lose; PF = Points for; PA = Points against; Diff = Points difference (+ or -); Pts = League points
League points: for win = 2; for draw = 1; for loss = 0.

== Notable players ==
R. Helliwell of Sowerby Bridge played in The Rest's 7-5 defeat by Leeds in the 1901–02 Yorkshire Senior Competition Champions versus The Rest match at Headingley Stadium on Saturday 19 April 1902.

== See also ==
- British rugby league system
- Cumberland League
- Rugby league county leagues
- List of defunct rugby league clubs
