= Holbeck Rugby Club =

Defunct English rugby league club, based in Leeds, Yorkshire

Holbeck Rugby Club, also known as the Holbeck Imps, was a semi-professional rugby league club based in Leeds, West Riding of Yorkshire, England. The club were the original owners of Elland Road football stadium, now the home of Leeds United.

== History ==
The exact date Holbeck were formed is unknown, but they joined the Northern Union in time for its second season in 1896–97. They played for eight seasons, from 1896–97 to 1903–04. As semi-professionals, Holbeck played at the Recreation Ground on Elland Road.

The city of Leeds had an abundance of rugby football clubs and although members of the Yorkshire RFU, which was in turn part of the RFU, it was decided to form a more local association. It was for this reason that the Leeds & District organization was formalised when a meeting took place at the Green Dragon Hotel, Leeds, on 27 September 1888. The founding clubs were Bramley, Holbeck, Hunslet, Kirkstall, Leeds Parish Church, Leeds St John’s and Wortley.

In the 1896–97 season, the league was divided into Yorkshire and Lancashire Senior Competitions, Holbeck entering the former. They finished 15th (second bottom) with 18 points from 30 games. In 1897, when the lease was not renewed on Holbeck Recreation Ground, they bought the Old Peacock Ground from Bentley's Brewery for £1,100, with a stipulation that it remained a football ground for at least seven years, and that all the catering rights should be held for that period by the brewery. The site of the Old Peacock Ground, an open grass field, was at the foot of Beeston Hill on the Leeds to Elland Road. The land was known locally as the Old Peacock Ground due to the close proximity to the pub of the same name which it faced.

The club erected a new stand in the close season in readiness for the forthcoming 1898–99 season. The ground eventually became known simply as Elland Road.

Over the next four seasons Holbeck struggled, finishing 14th in 1897–98, 13th in 1898–99, 13th in 1899–1900 and 14th again in 1900–01, in each case out of 16 clubs.

At the end of this season the top seven clubs in both the Lancashire Senior Competition and the Yorkshire Senior Competition split and formed the "new" Rugby League. The remaining clubs, which included Holbeck and several new additions, continued in the Lancashire and Yorkshire Senior Competitions, which became in effect two regional second divisions.

Only limited County League information is available for (1901–02). Holbeck finished in fifth position, but unfortunately for them there was no promotion and relegation. At the end of this season, several more clubs withdrew and the league was again re-organised into two divisions of 16 clubs.

In 1902–03, Holbeck again finished 5th out of the 16 clubs. For the 1902–03 season football team Leeds Woodville ground shared as tenants of Holbeck Rugby Club.

In 1903–04, in what was to be Holbeck’s last season, Wakefield Trinity were champions with 55 points from 32 games, with St Helens and Holbeck in joint second place, both on 39 points. A promotion play-off took place on a neutral ground on Saturday 14 May 1904 and St. Helens were promoted after beating Holbeck 7–0. As a result, the club decided that it would be financially unable to continue in the second division and folded.

== Successor clubs ==
At a meeting at the Griffin Hotel in Boar Lane in August 1904, a new Association football club, Leeds City Association Football Club, was formed and it was agreed that the Elland Road ground would be rented for the upcoming season. It has been suggested that Holbeck Rugby Club reformed as Leeds City but there does not appear to be any hard evidence to support this claim.

Leeds City were expelled from the Football League in 1919 but Leeds United took their place five years later and have played at Elland Road ever since.

== Club colours ==
Several articles suggest that Holbeck RFC played in blue and yellow (or gold), which are the sporting colours of Leeds.

== Internationals to have played for Holbeck ==
- Tom Pook (b 1869 d 21 February 1948) was a "small" (only 5’6" tall) forward who played rugby union for Newport and Wales before turning semi-professional with Holbeck, making his Holbeck debut on 3 September 1898.

== Club records ==
=== Club scoring record ===
In a Season
	Details	Season	Competition		Notes	Ref
Highest League Position	3	1903–04	2nd Div	out of 17 clubs		
Lowest League Position	15	1896–97	Yorks Sen	out of 16 clubs		
Most League Points	49	1903–04	2nd Div	out of possible 64 = 77%		
Fewest League Points	15	1900–01	Yorks Sen	out of possible 60 = 25%		
Most Points Scored (PF)	256	1903–04	2nd Div	In 32 games = 8/game		
Most Points Conceded (PA)	310	1897–98	Yorks Sen	In 30 games = 5.7/game		
Fewest Points Scored (PF)	86	1896–97	Yorks Sen	In 30 games = 2.87/game		
Fewest Points Conceded (PA)	83	1902–03	2nd Div	In 34 games = 6.26/game		
Best Points Difference	136	1903–04	2nd Div	In 32 games		
Worst Points Difference	−153	1900–01	Yorks Sen	In 30 games		

=== Club league record ===
Season	Competition	Pos	Team Name	Pl	W	D	L	PW	PA	Diff	Pts	%	No of teams in league	Notes	Ref
1896–97	Yorks Sen	15	Holbeck	30	7	4	19	86	223	−137	18	0.3	16		
1897–98	Yorks Sen	14	Holbeck	30	11	0	19	171	310	−139	22	0.37	16		
1898–99	Yorks Sen	13	Holbeck	30	10	4	16	134	220	−86	24	0.4	16		
1899–1900	Yorks Sen	13	Holbeck	30	8	4	18	138	236	−98	18	0.3	16		
Holbeck had 2 points deducted for a breach of the professional rules.
1900–01	Yorks Sen	14	Holbeck	30	7	3	20	110	263	−153	15	0.25	16		
Holbeck had 2 points deducted.
1901–02	Yorks Sen	5	Holbeck								30		14		
Holbeck had 2 points deducted.
Only limited County League information is available for this season.
1902–03	2nd Div	5	Holbeck	34	20	5	9	213	83	130	45	0.66	18		
1903–04	2nd Div	3	Holbeck	32	24	1	7	256	120	136	49	0.77	17		-

Heading Abbreviations
Pl = Games played; W = Win; D = Draw; L = Lose; PF = Points for; PA = Points against; Diff = Points difference (+ or -); Pts = League Points League points: for win = 2; for draw = 1; for loss = 0.

=== Several fixtures and results ===
The following are a selection of Holbeck's fixtures from the eight seasons in which they played semi-professional rugby league :-

Season	Date	Competition	Opponent	Venue	H/A	Result	Score	Att	Notes	Ref
1896–97	Sat 28 November 1896	YSC	Hull	Boulevard	A	Lost	0–3			
1896–97	Tue 2 March 1897	YSC	Hull	Holbeck Rec	H	Draw	0–0		^{1}	
1896–97	Sat 27 March 1897	CC R2	Warrington	Wilderspool	A	Lost	0–24			
1897–98	Sat 20 November 1897	YSC	Hull	Old Peacock	H	Won	12–5		^{2}	
1897–98	Tue 22 February 1898	YSC	Hull	Boulevard	A	Lost	0–8			
1898–99	Sat 1 October 1898	YSC	Hull	Elland Road	H	Won	8–5			
1898–99	Sat 7 January 1899	YSC	Hull	Boulevard	A	Lost	0–35			
1899–1900	Sat 4 November 1899	YSC	Hull	Elland Road	H	Won	8–6			
1899–1900	Thu 22 February 1900	YSC	Hull	Boulevard	A	Lost	0–6			
1900–01	Sat 17 November 1900	YSC	Hull	Elland Road	H	Lost	5–14			
1900–01	Sat 23 February 1901	YSC	Hull	Boulevard	A	Lost	7–14			
1903–04	Fri 25 December 1903	Friendly	Hull	Boulevard	A	Lost	3–11			
1903–04	Sat 26 September 1903	D2	St. Helens	Elland Road	H	Won	19–3			
1903–04	Sat 23 January 1904	D2	St. Helens	Knowsley Road	A	Lost	0–10			
1903–04	Sat 14 May 1904	D2 PO	St. Helens	neutral ground	N	Lost	0–7			

Competition Abbreviations
YSC = Yorkshire Senior Competition; D2 = 2nd Division
D2 PO = 2nd Division Promotion Play-Off
CC R2 = Challenge Cup, round 2

- ^{1} – Holbeck Rec = Holbeck Recreation Ground.
- ^{2} – Old Peacock = Old Peacock Ground before it became established.

== Notable players ==
- Jacky Braithwaite
- Tom Pook
- Kelly of Holbeck played, and G. Hainsworth of Holbeck played, and scored a goal in The Rest's 5-7 defeat by Leeds in the 1901–02 Yorkshire Senior Competition Champions versus The Rest match at Headingley Stadium on Saturday 19 April 1902.

== See also ==
- Elland Road
- Leeds City F.C.
- List of defunct rugby league clubs
