= Morecambe RFC =

Defunct English semi-professional rugby league club

Club information
- Full name: Morecambe Rugby Football Club
- Colours: black and white hoops
- Founded: 1876; 150 years ago
- Exited: 1906; 120 years ago

Former details
- Ground: Moss Lane, Morecambe
- Competition: 1905–06 Northern Rugby Football Union season

Morecambe Rugby Football Club was a semi-professional rugby league club. The club was based in Morecambe, a resort town now within the City of Lancaster in Lancashire, England.

The club played semi-professional rugby league for a total of 8 seasons in all. They first became members of the Northern Rugby Football Union (now Rugby Football League) for three continuous seasons from 1896–97 to 1898–99.

After finishing bottom of the Lancashire Senior Competition in 1899 and losing a promotion play off with Millom, the club spent the next two seasons in the Lancashire Second Competition. Promoted back to the Lancashire Senior Competition in 1901, playing another four seasons from 1901–02 to 1905–06. At the end of season 1905–06 the club left the league, at which point Jack Bartholomew (the uncle of the comedian Eric Morecambe) left the club and joined Huddersfield, he would later play for Great Britain, and Bradford Northern.

== History ==
=== Early Days ===
Morecambe FC was formed as a rugby football club in 1876. They joined the ranks of the semi-professionals when they became members of the Northern Union in its second season 1896–97 and played for three seasons in the Lancashire Senior Competition. In each of these three seasons, the club finished at the bottom of the league, 14th out of 14 clubs.

At the end of this third season, 1898–99, Morecambe were relegated from the Lancashire Senior Competition and were replaced by Millom. The next two seasons were played in the Lancashire Second Competition although the club missed out on a return to the Senior Competition at the end of the 1900–01 season losing to Widnes in the play-off.

Morecambe returned for the start of the 1901–02 and finished in 11th place out of 13 clubs. At the end of the 1901–02 season, the County Leagues elected 18 teams to join the new Division 2 (7 from Lancashire and 10 from Yorkshire and new member South Shields) with the existing second competition scrapped.

In 1902–03 Morecambe, being one of the fortunate clubs, joined the new 2nd Division, where they would stay for the next three seasons. In the first season in the new second division (1902–03) they finished 17th out of 18 clubs. Similarly, in the following two seasons the club could only manage to finish second bottom in each season.

In 1905–06 the Rugby League combined the divisions to form one united league. In this, Morecambe’s final season in the semi-professional ranks, they again finished second bottom, 30th out of 31 clubs. At the annual general meeting on 23 August 1906, the members decided to disband the club, the Midland Railway company having given the club notice to quit their Moss Lane ground.

=== Centenary Match ===
In 1904, Morecambe and Lancaster, very close neighbours, were drawn against each other in the first round of the Rugby League Challenge Cup. 100 years later the two clubs Morecambe (being represented by Heysham Atoms ARLFC) and Lancaster agreed to play a centenary commemorative match, the winner would be presented with the "Morecambe Bay State of Origin Trophy". And so on Tuesday 11 May 2004, at Lancaster City AFC's Giant Axe Stadium, Morecambe (playing in the traditional black and white hoops) beat Lancaster (in Red and white hoops) 24-15.

=== Stadium ===
Morecambe played at Moss Lane in North West Morecambe, quite near the seafront, and in the vicinity of the present Morrisons supermarket.

== Club league record ==
The league positions for Morecambe for the 8 years in which they played semi-professional rugby league are given in the following table:

Season	Competition	Pos	Team Name	Pl	W	D	L	PW	PA	Diff	Pts	% Pts	No of teams in league	Notes	Ref
1896–97	Lancs Sen Comp	14	Morecambe	26	3	0	23	52	238	-186	6		14		
1897–98	Lancs Sen Comp	14	Morecambe	26	4	2	20	74	285	-211	10		14		
1898–99	Lancs Sen Comp	14	Morecambe	26	2	1	23	47	281	-234	5		14		
1899–1900	Lancashire Second Competition														
1900–01	Lancashire Second Competition														
1901–02	Lancs Sen Comp	11	Morecambe	24	5	1	18	103	181	-78	11		13		
1902–03	2nd Div	17	Morecambe	34	9	2	23	88	220	-132	20		18		
1903–04	2nd Div	16	Morecambe	32	5	3	24	72	287	-215	13		17		
1904–05	2nd Div	13	Morecambe	26	7	2	17	88	272	-184	16		14		
1905–06	RL	30	Morecambe	26	2	4	20	99	282	-183	8	15.38	31		

Heading Abbreviations
RL = Single Division; Pl = Games played; W = Win; D = Draw; L = Lose; PF = Points for; PA = Points against; Diff = Points difference (+ or -); Pts = League points
League points: for win = 2; for draw = 1; for loss = 0.

== See also ==
- List of defunct rugby league clubs
