= South Shields (rugby league) =

Defunct English semi-professional rugby league club

South Shields RLC
Club information
- Full name: South Shields Rugby League Club
- Founded: 1902; 124 years ago
- Exited: 1904; 122 years ago

Former details
- Ground: Horsley Hill, South Shields
- Competition: 1903–04 Northern Rugby Football Union season

South Shields was a semi-professional rugby league club. The club was based in South Shields then in County Durham at the mouth of the River Tyne, England.

The club played semi-professional rugby league for a total of two seasons, 1902–03 and 1903–04, joining direct from foundation. They were voted out of the league at the end of season 1903–04.

== History ==
=== Early Days ===
There had already been rugby league teams based on Tyneside just after the rugby schism that resulted in the formation of rugby league, Wallsend RFC, but they had not had great success.

South Shields were founded in 1902. They had not played in any league when elected to the Rugby Football League 2nd Division for the 1902–03 season.

=== Northern Union ===
At the end of the 1901–02 season, the County Leagues elected 18 teams to join the new Division 2 (7 from Lancashire and 10 from Yorkshire and new member South Shields) with the existing second competition scrapped.

In their first season of 1902–03 South Shields finished a lowly 14th out of 18 clubs.

In their second and last season, 1903–04, they again had a poor season and finished 15th out of 17 clubs.

Although there is virtually no evidence, it is suspected that South Shields Rugby League Club had failed to attract any reasonable attendances or generate sufficient income, due probably to apathy on behalf of the population. The same apathy had resulted in the same two problems affecting the several Association football clubs who had gone both before and after them, and all of which had gone into liquidation, administration or bankruptcy. South Shields Rugby Club were voted out of the league at the end of season 1903–04.

=== Stadium ===
South Shields played at Horsley Hill in North East South Shields, quite near the sea front.

After the demise of South Shields Rugby Club, the newly formed South Shields Adelaide AFC. took over the former rugby ground, early in 1905 for an annual rental of £30. This action almost caused the demise of Adelaide as well, as a promised loan for this purpose failed to materialise. It was left to a local solicitor, Victor Grunhut, to loan the money to the club, a simple loan of £35 on a simple IOU, payable within three months.

A third South Shield FC emerged in 1936, also playing initially at Horsley Hill, which by this time had become a greyhound stadium.

The stadium closed to Greyhound Racing in 1966, remaining as ‘The Dog’s Bowl’ bowling alley until it was demolished in the late 70's. A jet filling station had been built on the car park at the junction of Horsley Hill Road and Westcott Avenue.

After demolition, the area was redeveloped for housing.

== Colours ==
The club's colours were black and white.

== Club League Record ==
The league positions for South Shields for the two seasons in which they played semi-professional rugby league are given in the following table:-

Season	Competition	Pos	Team Name	Pl	W	D	L	PW	PA	Diff	Pts	% Pts	No of teams in league	Notes	Ref
1902–03	2nd Div	14	South Shields	34	10	2	22	158	264	-106	22		18		
1903–04	2nd Div	15	South Shields	32	6	1	25	140	336	-196	13		17		
At the end of the season they were voted out by the other clubs.

Heading Abbreviations
RL = Single Division; Pl = Games played; W = Win; D = Draw; L = Lose; PF = Points for; PA = Points against; Diff = Points difference (+ or -); Pts = League points
% Pts = A percentage system was used to determine league positions due to clubs playing varying number of fixtures and against different opponents
League points: for win = 2; for draw = 1; for loss = 0.

== Several fixtures & results ==
The following are just a few of South Shields fixtures during the two seasons in which they played (semi) professional Rugby League.

Season	Date	Competition	Opponent	Venue	H/A	Result	Score	Att	Notes	Ref
1901–02	Sat 02-11-1902	Friendly	Hull	Horsley Hill	TBC	Won	12-6			
1903–04	Sat 07-11-1903	2nd Div	St. Helens	Horsley Hill	H	Lost	6–0			
1903–04	Sat 30–04-1904	2nd Div	St. Helens	Knowsley Rd	A	Lost	23–0			

== See also ==
- List of defunct rugby league clubs
