= 1900–01 Challenge Cup =

Rugby league competition

1901 Challenge Cup
- Duration: 6 rounds
- Highest attendance: 29,563
- Winners: Batley
- Runners-up: Warrington

The 1901 Challenge Cup was the 5th staging of rugby league's oldest knockout competition, the Challenge Cup. Contested during the 1900–01 Northern Rugby Football Union season, the final was played between Batley and Warrington at Headingley Stadium in Leeds.

== First round ==
Team One	Score	Team Two	Match information	
Team One	Score	Team Two	Date	Venue
Aspatria	4–3	Altrincham	2 March	
Barrow	11–0	Brighouse Rangers	2 March	Cavendish Park
Birkenhead Wanderers	2–0	Millom	2 March	Park Station
Bradford	7–2	Swinton	2 March	Park Avenue
Broughton Rangers	24–3	Tyldesley	2 March	Wheater's Field
Dewsbury	9–5	Featherstone	2 March	Crown Flatt
Goole	2–12	St Helens	2 March	Victoria Grounds
Hebden Bridge	6–0	Whitworth	2 March	
Heckmondwike	8–0	Seaton Rangers	2 March	Beck Lane
Huddersfield	6–3	Hull F.C.	2 March	Fartown
Hull Kingston Rovers	4–0	Salford	2 March	Craven Street
Hunslet	8–0	Wath Brow Hornets	2 March	Parkside
Keighley	13–0	Kinsley	2 March	Lawkholme Lane
Lancaster	3–3	Maryport	2 March	Quay Meadow
Leeds Parish Church	11–0	Radcliffe	2 March	Clarence Field
Leeds	0–19	Warrington	2 March	Headingley
Leigh	38–0	Alverthorpe	2 March	Mather Lane
Liversedge	3–2	Normanton	2 March	Hightown
Manningham	0–0	Castleford	2 March	Valley Parade
Morecambe	11–0	Pontefract	2 March	Moss Lane
Otley	0–19	Oldham	2 March	Watersheddings
Outwood Church	2–5	Holbeck	2 March	Coach Road
Rochedale Hornets	3–7	Bramley	2 March	Athletic Grounds
Runcorn	18–0	Wigan	2 March	Canal Street
Stockport	13–2	Shipley	2 March	Edgeley Park
Todmorden	2–11	Sowerby Bridge	2 March	
Wakefield Trinity	28–6	Eastmoor	2 March	Belle Vue
Whitehaven Recs	0–3	Widnes	2 March	Recreation Ground
Windhill	3–5	Ossett	2 March	
York	10–2	Halifax	2 March	Wiggington Road
Barrow	0–2	Broughton Rangers	6 March - replay	Cavendish Park
Castleford	21–2	Manningham	6 March - replay	Hunt's Field
Maryport	3–0	Lancaster	6 March - replay	

== Second round ==
Team One	Score	Team Two	Match information	
Team One	Score	Team Two	Date	Venue
Aspatria	2–21	Wakefield Trinity	9 Mar	Belle Vue
Batley	6–2	Huddersfield	9 Mar	Mount Pleasant
Bramley	7–10	Oldham	9 Mar	Hanson Lane
Castleford	3–2	Workington	9 Mar	Hunt's Field
Dewsbury	8–0	Morecambe	9 Mar	Crown Flatt
Hebden Bridge	3–33	Broughton Rangers	9 Mar	
Holbeck	3–6	Bradford	9 Mar	Elland Road
Keighley	5–5	York	9 Mar	Lawkholme Lane
Liversedge	0–5	Leeds Parish Church	9 Mar	Hightown
Maryport	0–11	Hull Kingston Rovers	9 Mar	Craven Street
Ossett	5–5	Birkenhead	9 Mar	
Runcorn	16–4	Leigh	9 Mar	Canal Street
St Helens	0–0	Stockport	9 Mar	Knowsley Road
Sowerby Bridge	3–6	Brighouse Rangers	9 Mar	Beech Road
Warrington	19–2	Heckmondwike	9 Mar	Wilderspool
Widnes	8–0	Hunslet	9 Mar	Lowerhouse
Birkenhead	20–2	Ossett	13 Mar - replay	Park Station
Stockport	5–11	St Helens	13 Mar - replay	Edgeley Park
York	12–0	Keighley	13 Mar - replay	Wiggington Road

== Third round ==
Team One	Score	Team Two	Match information	
Team One	Score	Team Two	Date	Venue
Birkenhead Wanderers	2–10	Widnes	23 Mar	Park Station
Brighouse Rangers	0–7	Hull Kingston Rovers	23 Mar	Lane Head
Broughton Rangers	4–11	Oldham	23 Mar	Wheater's Field
Dewsbury	3–5	C astleford	23 Mar	Crown Flatt
Runcorn	21–0	York	23 Mar	Canal Street
St Helens	5–7	Batley	23 Mar	Knowlsey Road
Wakefield Trinity	4–5	Bradford	23 Mar	Belle Vue
Warrington	11–0	Leeds Parish Church	23 Mar	Wilderspool

== Quarterfinals ==
Team One	Score	Team Two	Match information	
Team One	Score	Team Two	Date	Venue
Batley	5–2	Runcorn	30 Mar	Mount Pleasant
Hull Kingston Rovers	5–5	Castleford	30 Mar	Craven Street
Warrington	10–8	Bradford	30 Mar	Wilderspool
Widnes	0–8	Oldham	30 Mar	Lowerhouse
Castleford	7–2	Hull Kingston Rovers	3 Apr - replay	Hunt's Field

== Semifinals ==
Team One	Score	Team Two	Match information	
Team One	Score	Team Two	Date	Venue
Batley	9–2	Oldham	13 Apr	Fartown
Warrington	21–5	Castleford	13 Apr	Wheater's Field

== Final ==
The final was played on Saturday 27 April 1901, where Batley beat Warrington 16-8 at Headingley in front of a crowd of 29,563.

27 April 1901

Batley	6–0	Warrington
Try: Davies, Auty	Report

Headingley, Leeds
Attendance: 29,563
Referee: J. Kidd (Millom)

1	Arthur Garner
2	Wattie Davies
3	Dai Fitzgerald
4	John B. Goodall
5	Wilf Auty
6	Joseph "Joe" Oakland (c)
7	James "Jim" Midgley
8	Fred Fisher
9	Patrick "Pat" "Paddy" Judge
10	Jack Rogers
11	Charles "Charlie" Stubley
12	Robert Spurr
13	George Henry Main (often misspelled Maine)
14	Fred 'Ted' Fozzard
15	Frank Hollingworth

1	Jack Hallam
2	Jack Fish
3	Danny Isherwood
4	George Dickenson
5	Elliott Harris
6	Robert Bate
7	Jack Duckworth
8	Alf Boardman
9	Tom Fell
10	Jim Edmondson
11	J. Scholtze
12	John Eden
13	J. Cunningham
14	David Morrison
15	Jack Swift
