= Alf Boardman =

England international rugby league footballer

Personal information
- Full name: Alfred Starkey Boardman
- Born: c. 1880 Warrington, England
- Died: November 1918 Latchford, Cheshire, Warrington, England

Playing information
- Position: Forward
Club
Years	Team	Pld	T	G	FG	P
1898–14	Warrington	403	29	0	0	87
Representative
Years	Team	Pld	T	G	FG	P
1903–06	Lancashire	6	1	0	0	3
1905	England	1	0	0	0	0

Alfred Starkey Boardman (c. 1880 – November 1918) was an English professional rugby league footballer who played in the 1890s, 1900s and 1910s. He played at representative level for England, and at club level for Warrington as a forward.

== Playing career ==
=== Club career ===
Alfred Boardman made his début for Warrington on Saturday 3 September 1898, and he played his last match for Warrington Saturday 17 January 1914.

=== Challenge Cup Final appearances ===
Alf Boardman played as a forward in Warrington's 0–6 defeat by Batley in the 1900–01 Challenge Cup Final during the 1900–01 season at Headingley, Leeds, in front of a crowd of 29,563, played as a forward in the 3–8 defeat by Halifax in the 1903–04 Challenge Cup Final during the 1903–04 season at The Willows, Salford, in front of a crowd of 17,041, played as a forward in the 6–0 victory over Hull Kingston Rovers in the 1904–05 Challenge Cup Final during the 1904–05 season at Headingley, Leeds, in front of a crowd of 19,638, and played as a forward in the 17–3 victory over Oldham in the 1906–07 Challenge Cup Final during the 1906–07 season at Wheater's Field, Broughton, Salford on Saturday 27 April 1907, in front of a crowd of 18,500.

=== Notable tour matches ===
Alf Boardman played as a forward in Warrington's 10–3 victory over Australia in the 1908–09 Kangaroo tour of Great Britain tour match during the 1908–09 season at Wilderspool Stadium, Warrington, Saturday 14 November 1908, in front of a crowd of 5,000, due to the strikes in the cotton mills, the attendance was badly affected, the loss of earnings meant that some fans could not afford to watch the first tour by the Australian rugby league team.

=== International honours ===
Alf Boardman won a cap for England while at Warrington in 1905 against Other Nationalities.

== Death and legacy ==
In November 1918, Boardman died of pneumonia, aged 38. His funeral took place at Warrington Cemetery.

In 2011, he was inducted into Warrington's Hall of Fame.
