= Jack Fish (rugby league) =

England international rugby league footballer

Personal information
- Full name: John Fish
- Born: 30 December 1878 Runcorn, Cheshire, England
- Died: 23 October 1940 (aged 61) Warrington, Cheshire, England

Playing information
- Height: 5 ft 7 in (1.70 m)
- Weight: 11 st 8 lb (73 kg)
- Position: Wing
Club
Years	Team	Pld	T	G	FG	P
1898–11	Warrington	321	214	263		1168
Representative
Years	Team	Pld	T	G	FG	P
1901–07	Lancashire	16	16	12		72
1904–08	England	3	3	2		13

Jack Fish (30 December 1878 – 23 October 1940) was an English professional rugby league footballer who played in the 1890s, 1900s and 1910s. He played at representative level for England and Lancashire, and at club level for Warrington (captain), as a goal-kicking wing.

== Biography ==
Jack Fish was born in Runcorn, Cheshire in 1878, he played for Lostock Gralam FC where he was soon noticed, and a trial match for Warrington was organised in 1898. Legend has it that as he entered the committee room he was confronted with a table heaped with £50 in silver, and the signing was then a mere formality, (based on increases in average earnings, this would be approximately £20,190 in 2017), and he died aged 61 in Warrington, Lancashire, England.

=== Professional playing career ===
Fish played in Warrington's friendly at home against Barrow on 15 October 1898 and scored from the half-way. His league début was the following week on 22 October 1898; a 3-2 victory at Rochdale Hornets. He went on to be Warrington's leading try scorer that season' and for the following six seasons, becoming the club's first superstar. Fish was a stockily built man, at only 5 ft 7 in (170 cm) and 11 st 8 lb (73 kg). He had fantastic acceleration and a tricky swerve, but he could also stop dead in his tracks whilst running at full speed, which left many would-be tacklers whizzing into touch! He once accepted a £100 sprint challenge with a flying wing called Buckie Green from Wigan, at Springfield Park, Wigan, and won in a canter, (based on increases in average earnings, this would be approximately £37,760 in 2017).

Fish played on the wing and scored a try, and a goal in Warrington's 10-3 victory over Australia in the 1908–09 Kangaroo tour of Great Britain tour match during the 1908–09 season at Wilderspool Stadium, Warrington, Saturday 14 November 1908, in front of a crowd of 5,000, due to the strikes in the cotton mills, the attendance was badly affected, the loss of earnings meant that some fans could not afford to watch the first tour by the Australian rugby league team, and played and scored a try in the 8-8 draw with Australia in the 1908–09 Kangaroo tour of Great Britain tour match during the 1908–09 season at Wilderspool Stadium, Warrington, Monday 8 February 1909, in front of a crowd of 7,000.

He was idolised in the town, and supporters could be seen wearing metal fish badges at games. When it came to cup ties he was put in the care of Heesom, a local professional sprinter, who gave the wing special preparation. He was prominent in Challenge Cup Finals, scoring twice including one from half way in 1905 as Warrington beat Hull Kingston Rovers 6-0 to win the trophy for the first time.

His testimonial match in 1910 raised over £268, (based on increases in average earnings, this would be approximately £93,470 in 2013), before playing his last match at Coventry in a First Round Challenge Cup match, where he scored his last try to help Warrington into the next round in an 18-10 victory. Fish won caps for England while at Warrington in 1904 and in 1906 against Other Nationalities. He broke his leg in the 1906 match. Fish played again for England in 1908 against Wales.

Fish's last match for Warrington was on 18 February 1911. Altogether he played 321 games for the club, scoring 215 tries and kicking 262 goals for a total of 1,169 points.

His representative honours amounted to playing twice for England and 16 times for Lancashire for whom he scored and 16 tries and 12 goals.

=== Challenge Cup Final appearances ===
Jack Fish played on the wing in Warrington's 0–6 defeat by Batley in the 1900–01 Challenge Cup Final during the 1900–01 season at Headingley, Leeds, in front of a crowd of 29,563, played on the wing in the 3–8 defeat by Halifax in the 1903–04 Challenge Cup Final during the 1903–04 season at The Willows, Salford, in front of a crowd of 17,041, played on the wing in the 6–0 victory over Hull Kingston Rovers in the 1904–05 Challenge Cup Final during the 1904–05 season at Headingley, Leeds, in front of a crowd of 19,638, and played on the wing was captain, and scored a sensational try hacking on a wayward Oldham pass, dribbling forward and then picking up the bouncing ball to swerve round the Oldham fullback; Richard Llewellyn "Dickie" /"Dicky" Thomas in the 17–3 victory over Oldham in the 1906–07 Challenge Cup Final during the 1906–07 season at Wheater's Field, Broughton, Salford on Saturday 27 April 1907, in front of a crowd of 18,500.

=== Post-playing ===
Fish is still the only player in Warrington's history to score more than 200 tries and 200 goals.
