= County Championship (rugby league) =

Rugby league competition for British county teams

- Sport: Rugby league
- Instituted: 1895; 130 years ago
- Ceased: 1983; 42 years ago
- Number of teams: 7
- Region: England; Wales (RFL)
- Most titles: Lancashire (34 titles)

The County Championship was a representative competition of British counties in rugby league between 1895 and 1983.

Throughout the competition history the championship was contested by Lancashire, Yorkshire (both present in every season), Cheshire, Cumbria, Durham and Northumberland, Glamorgan and Monmouthshire, and Other Nationalities. The games between Lancashire and Yorkshire became known as the War of the Roses.

== History ==
When the northern clubs broke away from the Rugby Football Union (RFU) to form the Northern Rugby Football Union (NRFU) there was already a county championship competition within the RFU and the NRFU organised a similar competition as one of its first actions with the first fixtures being announced on 17 September 1895, only three weeks after the split from the RFU.

All the constituent clubs of the NRFU at this point came from just three counties; Cheshire, Lancashire and Yorkshire so the championship was organised to involve sides from these three locations. Players were eligible to play for their county of birth or the county in which they first played.

In the first season the all three teams won one game each so the NRFU arranged a further round of fixtures so that each county had played the others both home and away. With Lancashire winning both of their second set fixture, they became the first winners of the County Championship. This was the only season the teams played each other twice. In all subsequent seasons each team only played the others once.

The first change to the structure came in 1898 with the addition of Cumberland to the championship. Four years (the 1902–1903 season) later a fifth team entered the competition with a team jointly representing Durham and Northumberland playing. Durham and Northumberland's participation only lasted until the end of the 1903–1904 season when the county union withdrew from the Championship.

The competition continued as a four-team competition for a further two seasons but prior to the start of the 1905–1906 season Cheshire withdrew and effectively merging with Lancashire, the Runcorn club was admitted to the Lancashire League and its players became eligible for selection by Lancashire.

Until the competition was suspended at the outbreak of the First World War, it continued as a triangular competition with the only change being to allow players born in Westmorland to play for Cumberland.

Resuming in the 1919–1920 season there were no changes to the format until the Rugby Football League (RFL) (the NRFU became the RFL in 1922) admitted a team jointly representing the Welsh counties of Glamorgan and Monmouthshire. The Welsh side's involvement lasted just four seasons and they dropped out of the Championship after the 1930–1931 season.

From 1931 until 1974 the competition remained a three team affair. Suspended again during the Second World War the competition resumed in 1945 and remained unchanged the 1974–1975 season when an Other Nationalities team competed for two seasons. Back to three teams from 1976–1977 the competition was last held in the 1982–1983 season when due to declining attendances the competition was abandoned. The final competition, 1982–1983, was held immediately after the end of the 1981–1982 league season as the fixture calendar for the autumn was congested with fixtures for the visiting Australian team.

During the 1977–1978 season the competition was not held and instead two games (Yorkshire v Cumbria and Lancashire v Yorkshire) were held to raise money for the Queen's Silver Jubilee Fund.

== Titles ==
The title was awarded to the team with the most competition points (2 points for a win, 1 point for a draw). After the 1905–1906 competition ended with Lancashire and Cumberland both on 3-points a play-off game was organised between the two but ended in a 3-all draw so the championship was awarded to both teams. From then on until the 1950s if two teams finished on the same number of competition points then the title was awarded jointly to both counties and if three teams finished on the same number of competition points, the title was classed as "undecided".

The 1952–1953 season ended with all three teams having won one game each, Lancashire were awarded the title on points average (points scored divided by points conceded). The following season an additional play-off match was arranged between the two teams in the tie with the best points average. Five titles between 1953–1954 and 1972–1973 were decided in this way. In 1978-1979 and 1979–1980 both competitions ended in three-way ties but no play-off game was arranged and the title was awarded to the team with the best points difference.

Championships won:

- Lancashire 34: 1895–1896, 1896–1897, 1899–1900, 1900–1901, 1902–1903, 1903–1904, 1905–1906, 1906–1907, 1908–1909, 1910–1911, 1922–1923, 1923–1924, 1924–1925, 1925–1926, 1926–1927, 1928–1929, 1929–1930, 1931–1932, 1935–1936, 1936–1937, 1937–1938, 1938–1939, 1945–1946, 1947–1948, 1952–1953, 1955–1956, 1956–1957, 1960–1961, 1967–1968, 1969–1970, 1973–1974, 1974–1975, 1978–1979, 1979–1980.
- Yorkshire 24: 1897–1898, 1898–1899, 1904–1905, 1909–1910, 1912–1913, 1920–1921, 1921–1922, 1922–1923, 1930–1931, 1946–1947, 1951–1952, 1953–1954, 1954–1955, 1957–1958, 1958–1959, 1962–1963, 1964–1965, 1968–1969, 1970–1971, 1971–1972, 1972–1973, 1975–1976, 1976–1977, 1982–1983.
- Cumberland/Cumbria 16: 1905–1906, 1907–1908, 1909–1910, 1911–1912, 1927–1928, 1932–1933, 1933–1934, 1934–1935, 1948–1949, 1959–1960, 1961–1962, 1963–1964, 1965–1966, 1966–1967, 1980–1981, 1981–1982.
- Cheshire 1: 1901–1902.

== Tables ==
Rugby League County Championship table 1895–1896
County	Matches played	Won	Drawn	Lost	Points for	Points against	Points difference	Points average	Points	Champions
Lancashire	4	3	0	1	17	11	6	1.55	6	Lancashire
Yorkshire	4	2	0	2	32	23	9	1.39	4	
Cheshire	4	1	0	3	15	30	-15	0.5	2	

Rugby League County Championship table 1896–1897
County	Matches played	Won	Drawn	Lost	Points for	Points against	Points difference	Points average	Points	Champions
Lancashire	2	2	0	0	15	3	12	5	4	Lancashire
Yorkshire	2	1	0	1	20	17	3	1.18	2	
Cheshire	2	0	0	2	10	25	-15	0.4	0	

Rugby League County Championship table 1897–1898
County	Matches played	Won	Drawn	Lost	Points for	Points against	Points difference	Points average	Points	Champions
Yorkshire	2	2	0	0	29	9	20	3.22	4	Yorkshire
Lancashire	2	1	0	1	17	17	0	1	2	
Cheshire	2	0	0	2	13	33	-20	0.39	0	

Rugby League County Championship table 1898–1899
County	Matches played	Won	Drawn	Lost	Points for	Points against	Points difference	Points average	Points	Champions
Yorkshire	3	3	0	0	42	16	26	2.63	6	Yorkshire
Cheshire	3	2	0	1	11	21	-10	0.52	4	
Cumberland	3	1	0	2	21	15	6	1.4	2	
Lancashire	3	0	0	3	16	38	-22	0.42	0	

Rugby League County Championship table 1899–1900
County	Matches played	Won	Drawn	Lost	Points for	Points against	Points difference	Points average	Points	Champions
Lancashire	3	3	0	0	39	20	19	1.95	6	Lancashire
Yorkshire	3	1	0	2	28	30	-2	0.93	2	
Cumberland	3	1	0	2	15	24	-9	0.63	2	
Cheshire	3	1	0	2	9	17	-8	0.53	2	

Rugby League County Championship table 1900–1901
County	Matches played	Won	Drawn	Lost	Points for	Points against	Points difference	Points average	Points	Champions
Lancashire	3	3	0	0	75	7	68	10.71	6	Lancashire
Yorkshire	3	2	0	1	55	29	26	1.9	4	
Cheshire	3	1	0	2	11	73	-62	0.15	2	
Cumberland	3	0	0	3	10	42	-32	0.24	0	

Rugby League County Championship table 1901–1902
County	Matches played	Won	Drawn	Lost	Points for	Points against	Points difference	Points average	Points	Champions
Cheshire	3	2	1	0	35	11	24	3.18	5	Cheshire
Yorkshire	3	2	0	1	32	26	6	1.23	4	
Lancashire	3	1	1	1	35	24	11	1.46	3	
Cumberland	3	0	0	3	8	49	-41	0.16	0	

Rugby League County Championship table 1902–1903
County	Matches played	Won	Drawn	Lost	Points for	Points against	Points difference	Points average	Points	Champions
Lancashire	4	4	0	0	55	11	44	5	8	Lancashire
Yorkshire	4	2	0	2	44	25	19	1.76	4	
Cheshire	4	2	0	2	27	24	3	1.13	4	
Durham and Northumberland	4	1	0	3	9	23	-14	0.39	2	
Cumberland	4	1	0	3	12	64	-52	0.19	2	

Rugby League County Championship table 1903–1904
County	Matches played	Won	Drawn	Lost	Points for	Points against	Points difference	Points average	Points	Champions
Lancashire	4	4	0	0	91	5	86	18.2	8	Lancashire
Yorkshire	4	3	0	1	60	29	31	2.07	6	
Cheshire	4	2	0	2	30	62	-32	0.48	4	
Durham and Northumberland	4	1	0	3	29	84	-55	0.35	2	
Cumberland	4	0	0	4	17	47	-30	0.36	0	

Rugby League County Championship table 1904–1905
County	Matches played	Won	Drawn	Lost	Points for	Points against	Points difference	Points average	Points	Champions
Yorkshire	3	3	0	0	44	6	38	7.33	6	Yorkshire
Cheshire	3	2	0	1	6	14	-8	0.43	4	
Cumberland	3	1	0	2	16	23	-7	0.7	2	
Lancashire	3	0	0	3	5	28	-23	0.18	0	

Rugby League County Championship table 1905–1906
County	Matches played	Won	Drawn	Lost	Points for	Points against	Points difference	Points average	Points	Champions
Lancashire	2	1	1	0	11	3	8	3.67	3	Jointly awarded
Cumberland	2	1	1	0	8	3	5	2.67	3	Jointly awarded
Yorkshire	2	0	0	2	0	13	-13	0	0	

Rugby League County Championship table 1906–1907
County	Matches played	Won	Drawn	Lost	Points for	Points against	Points difference	Points average	Points	Champions
Lancashire	2	2	0	0	34	4	30	8.5	4	Lancashire
Yorkshire	2	1	0	1	15	31	-16	0.48	2	
Cumberland	2	0	0	2	16	30	-14	0.53	0	

Rugby League County Championship table 1907–1908
County	Matches played	Won	Drawn	Lost	Points for	Points against	Points difference	Points average	Points	Champions
Cumberland	2	2	0	0	14	6	8	2.33	4	Cumberland
Yorkshire	2	1	0	1	18	18	0	1	2	
Lancashire	2	0	0	2	14	22	-8	0.64	0	

Rugby League County Championship table 1908–1909
County	Matches played	Won	Drawn	Lost	Points for	Points against	Points difference	Points average	Points	Champions
Lancashire	2	2	0	0	28	8	20	3.5	4	Lancashire
Yorkshire	2	1	0	1	30	13	17	2.31	2	
Cumberland	2	0	0	2	8	45	-37	0.18	0	

Rugby League County Championship table 1909–1910
County	Matches played	Won	Drawn	Lost	Points for	Points against	Points difference	Points average	Points	Champions
Yorkshire	1	1	0	0	27	14	13	1.93	2	Jointly awarded
Cumberland	1	1	0	0	8	3	5	2.67	2	Jointly awarded
Lancashire	2	0	0	2	17	35	-18	0.49	0	

Rugby League County Championship table 1910–1911
County	Matches played	Won	Drawn	Lost	Points for	Points against	Points difference	Points average	Points	Champions
Lancashire	2	2	0	0	30	11	19	2.73	4	Lancashire
Yorkshire	2	1	0	1	31	28	3	1.11	2	
Cumberland	2	0	0	2	19	41	-22	0.46	0	

Rugby League County Championship table 1911–1912
County	Matches played	Won	Drawn	Lost	Points for	Points against	Points difference	Points average	Points	Champions
Cumberland	2	2	0	0	44	20	24	2.2	4	Cumberland
Lancashire	2	1	0	1	20	40	-20	0.5	2	
Yorkshire	2	0	0	2	25	29	-4	0.86	0	

Rugby League County Championship table 1912–1913
County	Matches played	Won	Drawn	Lost	Points for	Points against	Points difference	Points average	Points	Champions
Yorkshire	2	2	0	0	39	13	26	3	4	Yorkshire
Cumberland	2	1	0	1	16	19	-3	0.84	2	
Lancashire	2	0	0	2	8	31	-23	0.26	0	

Rugby League County Championship table 1913–1914
County	Matches played	Won	Drawn	Lost	Points for	Points against	Points difference	Points average	Points	Champions
Lancashire	2	1	0	1	35	22	13	1.59	2	Undecided
Yorkshire	2	1	0	1	22	19	3	1.16	2	Undecided
Cumberland	2	1	0	1	11	27	-16	0.41	2	Undecided

Rugby League County Championship table 1919–1920
County	Matches played	Won	Drawn	Lost	Points for	Points against	Points difference	Points average	Points	Champions
Lancashire	2	1	0	1	18	10	8	1.8	2	Undecided
Yorkshire	2	1	0	1	30	24	6	1.25	2	Undecided
Cumberland	2	1	0	1	14	28	-14	0.5	2	Undecided

Rugby League County Championship table 1920–1921
County	Matches played	Won	Drawn	Lost	Points for	Points against	Points difference	Points average	Points	Champions
Yorkshire	2	2	0	0	45	9	36	5	4	Yorkshire
Lancashire	2	1	0	1	19	30	-11	0.63	2	
Cumberland	2	0	0	2	18	43	-25	0.42	0	

Rugby League County Championship table 1921–1922
County	Matches played	Won	Drawn	Lost	Points for	Points against	Points difference	Points average	Points	Champions
Yorkshire	2	2	0	0	35	14	21	2.5	4	Yorkshire
Lancashire	2	1	0	1	20	12	8	1.67	2	
Cumberland	2	0	0	2	19	48	-29	0.4	0	

Rugby League County Championship table 1922–1923
County	Matches played	Won	Drawn	Lost	Points for	Points against	Points difference	Points average	Points	Champions
Lancashire	2	1	1	0	57	20	37	2.85	3	Jointly awarded
Yorkshire	2	1	1	0	20	15	5	1.33	3	Jointly awarded
Cumberland	2	0	0	2	13	55	-42	0.24	0	

Rugby League County Championship table 1923–1924
County	Matches played	Won	Drawn	Lost	Points for	Points against	Points difference	Points average	Points	Champions
Lancashire	2	2	0	0	30	10	20	3	4	Lancashire
Yorkshire	2	1	0	1	56	18	38	3.11	2	
Cumberland	2	0	0	2	17	75	-58	0.23	0	

Rugby League County Championship table 1924–1925
County	Matches played	Won	Drawn	Lost	Points for	Points against	Points difference	Points average	Points	Champions
Lancashire	2	2	0	0	36	9	27	4	4	Lancashire
Cumberland	2	1	0	1	20	8	12	2.5	2	
Yorkshire	2	0	0	2	9	48	-39	0.19	0	

Rugby League County Championship table 1925–1926
County	Matches played	Won	Drawn	Lost	Points for	Points against	Points difference	Points average	Points	Champions
Lancashire	2	2	0	0	32	15	17	2.13	4	Lancashire
Cumberland	2	1	0	1	36	19	17	1.89	2	
Yorkshire	2	0	0	2	23	57	-34	0.4	0	

Rugby League County Championship table 1926–1927
County	Matches played	Won	Drawn	Lost	Points for	Points against	Points difference	Points average	Points	Champions
Lancashire	2	2	0	0	30	18	12	1.67	4	Lancashire
Cumberland	2	1	0	1	22	17	5	1.29	2	
Yorkshire	2	0	0	2	18	35	-17	0.51	0	

Rugby League County Championship table 1927–1928
County	Matches played	Won	Drawn	Lost	Points for	Points against	Points difference	Points average	Points	Champions
Cumberland	3	3	0	0	56	19	37	2.95	6	Cumberland
Glamorgan and Monmouthshire	3	1	0	2	36	45	-9	0.8	2	
Lancashire	3	1	0	2	44	58	-14	0.76	2	
Yorkshire	3	1	0	2	44	58	-14	0.76	2	

Rugby League County Championship table 1928–1929
County	Matches played	Won	Drawn	Lost	Points for	Points against	Points difference	Points average	Points	Champions
Lancashire	3	3	0	0	68	25	43	2.72	6	Lancashire
Cumberland	2	1	0	1	20	15	5	1.33	2	
Yorkshire	2	1	0	1	32	50	-18	0.64	2	
Glamorgan and Monmouthshire	3	0	0	3	32	62	-30	0.52	0	

Rugby League County Championship table 1929–1930
County	Matches played	Won	Drawn	Lost	Points for	Points against	Points difference	Points average	Points	Champions
Lancashire	3	3	0	0	62	13	49	4.77	6	Lancashire
Cumberland	3	1	0	2	24	30	-6	0.8	2	
Yorkshire	3	1	0	2	18	34	-16	0.53	2	
Glamorgan and Monmouthshire	3	1	0	2	22	49	-27	0.45	2	

Rugby League County Championship table 1930–1931
County	Matches played	Won	Drawn	Lost	Points for	Points against	Points difference	Points average	Points	Champions
Yorkshire	3	3	0	0	63	31	32	2.03	6	Yorkshire
Glamorgan and Monmouthshire	3	2	0	1	45	55	-10	0.82	4	
Lancashire	3	1	0	2	49	56	-7	0.88	2	
Cumberland	3	0	0	3	33	48	-15	0.69	0	

Rugby League County Championship table 1931–1932
County	Matches played	Won	Drawn	Lost	Points for	Points against	Points difference	Points average	Points	Champions
Lancashire	2	2	0	0	28	19	9	1.47	4	Lancashire
Cumberland	2	1	0	1	46	37	9	1.24	2	
Yorkshire	2	0	0	2	28	46	-18	0.61	0	

Rugby League County Championship table 1932–1933
County	Matches played	Won	Drawn	Lost	Points for	Points against	Points difference	Points average	Points	Champions
Cumberland	2	2	0	0	48	13	35	3.69	4	Cumberland
Yorkshire	2	1	0	1	40	42	-2	0.95	2	
Lancashire	2	0	0	2	6	39	-33	0.15	0	

Rugby League County Championship table 1933–1934
County	Matches played	Won	Drawn	Lost	Points for	Points against	Points difference	Points average	Points	Champions
Cumberland	2	2	0	0	25	11	14	2.27	4	Cumberland
Yorkshire	2	1	0	1	26	27	-1	0.96	2	
Lancashire	2	0	0	2	12	25	-13	0.48	0	

Rugby League County Championship table 1934–1935
County	Matches played	Won	Drawn	Lost	Points for	Points against	Points difference	Points average	Points	Champions
Cumberland	2	2	0	0	25	5	20	5	4	Cumberland
Lancashire	2	0	1	1	10	20	-10	0.5	1	
Yorkshire	2	0	1	1	5	15	-10	0.33	1	

Rugby League County Championship table 1935–1936
County	Matches played	Won	Drawn	Lost	Points for	Points against	Points difference	Points average	Points	Champions
Lancashire	2	2	0	0	23	9	14	2.56	4	Lancashire
Cumberland	2	1	0	1	23	22	1	1.05	2	
Yorkshire	2	0	0	2	20	35	-15	0.57	0	

Rugby League County Championship table 1936–1937
County	Matches played	Won	Drawn	Lost	Points for	Points against	Points difference	Points average	Points	Champions
Lancashire	2	2	0	0	46	16	30	2.88	4	Lancashire
Cumberland	2	1	0	1	26	28	-2	0.93	2	
Yorkshire	2	0	0	2	16	44	-28	0.36	0	

Rugby League County Championship table 1937–1938
County	Matches played	Won	Drawn	Lost	Points for	Points against	Points difference	Points average	Points	Champions
Lancashire	2	2	0	0	33	26	7	1.27	4	Lancashire
Yorkshire	2	0	1	1	16	17	-1	0.94	1	
Cumberland	2	0	1	1	24	30	-6	0.8	1	

Rugby League County Championship table 1938–1939
County	Matches played	Won	Drawn	Lost	Points for	Points against	Points difference	Points average	Points	Champions
Lancashire	2	1	1	0	18	17	1	1.06	3	Lancashire
Cumberland	2	1	0	1	23	14	9	1.64	2	
Yorkshire	2	0	1	1	16	26	-10	0.62	1	

Rugby League County Championship table 1945–1946
County	Matches played	Won	Drawn	Lost	Points for	Points against	Points difference	Points average	Points	Champions
Lancashire	2	2	0	0	35	19	16	1.84	4	Lancashire
Yorkshire	2	1	0	1	61	20	41	3.05	2	
Cumberland	2	0	0	2	6	63	-57	0.1	0	

Rugby League County Championship table 1946–1947
County	Matches played	Won	Drawn	Lost	Points for	Points against	Points difference	Points average	Points	Champions
Yorkshire	2	2	0	0	24	19	5	1.26	4	Yorkshire
Cumberland	2	0	1	1	9	11	-2	0.82	1	
Lancashire	2	0	1	1	10	13	-3	0.77	1	

Rugby League County Championship table 1947–1948
County	Matches played	Won	Drawn	Lost	Points for	Points against	Points difference	Points average	Points	Champions
Lancashire	2	2	0	0	42	23	19	1.83	4	Lancashire
Cumberland	2	1	0	1	28	27	1	1.04	2	
Yorkshire	2	0	0	2	17	37	-20	0.46	0	

Rugby League County Championship table 1948–1949
County	Matches played	Won	Drawn	Lost	Points for	Points against	Points difference	Points average	Points	Champions
Cumberland	2	2	0	0	29	9	20	3.22	4	Cumberland
Lancashire	2	1	0	1	21	18	3	1.17	2	
Yorkshire	2	0	0	2	3	26	-23	0.12	0	

Rugby League County Championship table 1949–1950
County	Matches played	Won	Drawn	Lost	Points for	Points against	Points difference	Points average	Points	Champions
Yorkshire	2	1	0	1	34	30	4	1.13	2	Undecided
Lancashire	2	1	0	1	33	35	-2	0.94	2	Undecided
Cumberland	2	1	0	1	30	32	-2	0.94	2	Undecided

Rugby League County Championship table 1950–1951
County	Matches played	Won	Drawn	Lost	Points for	Points against	Points difference	Points average	Points	Champions
Cumberland	2	1	0	1	22	18	4	1.22	2	Undecided
Yorkshire	2	1	0	1	28	25	3	1.12	2	Undecided
Lancashire	2	1	0	1	28	35	-7	0.8	2	Undecided

Rugby League County Championship table 1951–1952
County	Matches played	Won	Drawn	Lost	Points for	Points against	Points difference	Points average	Points	Champions
Yorkshire	2	2	0	0	40	8	32	5	4	Yorkshire
Lancashire	2	1	0	1	24	26	-2	0.92	2	
Cumberland	2	0	0	2	14	44	-30	0.32	0	

Rugby League County Championship table 1952–1953
County	Matches played	Won	Drawn	Lost	Points for	Points against	Points difference	Points average	Points	Champions
Lancashire	2	1	0	1	49	30	19	1.63	2	Lancashire
Yorkshire	2	1	0	1	23	16	7	1.44	2	
Cumberland	2	1	0	1	22	48	-26	0.46	2	

Rugby League County Championship table 1953–1954
County	Matches played	Won	Drawn	Lost	Points for	Points against	Points difference	Points average	Points	Champions
Yorkshire	2	1	0	1	26	25	1	1.04	2	Yorkshire beat Cumberland in play-off match
Cumberland	2	1	0	1	22	21	1	1.05	2	
Lancashire	2	1	0	1	23	25	-2	0.92	2	

Rugby League County Championship table 1954–1955
County	Matches played	Won	Drawn	Lost	Points for	Points against	Points difference	Points average	Points	Champions
Yorkshire	2	2	0	0	47	10	37	4.7	4	Yorkshire
Lancashire	2	1	0	1	34	27	7	1.26	2	
Cumberland	2	0	0	2	7	51	-44	0.14	0	

Rugby League County Championship table 1955–1956
County	Matches played	Won	Drawn	Lost	Points for	Points against	Points difference	Points average	Points	Champions
Lancashire	2	2	0	0	46	28	18	1.64	4	Lancashire
Yorkshire	2	1	0	1	24	28	-4	0.86	2	
Cumberland	2	0	0	2	20	34	-14	0.59	0	

Rugby League County Championship table 1956–1957
County	Matches played	Won	Drawn	Lost	Points for	Points against	Points difference	Points average	Points	Champions
Lancashire	2	2	0	0	77	42	35	1.83	4	Lancashire
Cumberland	2	1	0	1	36	56	-20	0.64	2	
Yorkshire	2	0	0	2	35	50	-15	0.7	0	

Rugby League County Championship table 1957–1958
County	Matches played	Won	Drawn	Lost	Points for	Points against	Points difference	Points average	Points	Champions
Yorkshire	2	2	0	0	52	29	23	1.79	4	Lancashire
Cumberland	2	1	0	1	40	39	1	1.03	2	
Lancashire	2	0	0	2	23	47	-24	0.49	0	

Rugby League County Championship table 1958–1959
County	Matches played	Won	Drawn	Lost	Points for	Points against	Points difference	Points average	Points	Champions
Lancashire	2	1	0	1	79	47	32	1.68	2	
Yorkshire	2	1	0	1	42	48	-6	0.88	2	Yorkshire beat Lancashire in play-off match
Cumberland	2	1	0	1	41	67	-26	0.61	2	

Rugby League County Championship table 1959–1960
County	Matches played	Won	Drawn	Lost	Points for	Points against	Points difference	Points average	Points	Champions
Cumberland	2	2	0	0	40	21	19	1.9	4	Cumberland
Yorkshire	2	1	0	1	51	54	-3	0.94	2	
Lancashire	2	0	0	2	36	52	-16	0.69	0	

Rugby League County Championship table 1960–1961
County	Matches played	Won	Drawn	Lost	Points for	Points against	Points difference	Points average	Points	Champions
Lancashire	2	2	0	0	53	38	15	1.39	4	Lancashire
Cumberland	2	1	0	1	61	51	10	1.2	2	
Yorkshire	2	0	0	2	39	64	-25	0.61	0	

Rugby League County Championship table 1961–1962
County	Matches played	Won	Drawn	Lost	Points for	Points against	Points difference	Points average	Points	Champions
Cumberland	2	2	0	0	44	26	18	1.69	4	Cumberland
Lancashire	2	1	0	1	32	33	-1	0.97	2	
Yorkshire	2	0	0	2	20	37	-17	0.54	0	

Rugby League County Championship table 1962–1963
County	Matches played	Won	Drawn	Lost	Points for	Points against	Points difference	Points average	Points	Champions
Yorkshire	2	2	0	0	33	10	23	3.3	4	Yorkshire
Lancashire	2	1	0	1	36	30	6	1.2	2	
Cumberland	2	0	0	2	10	39	-29	0.26	0	

Rugby League County Championship table 1963–1964
County	Matches played	Won	Drawn	Lost	Points for	Points against	Points difference	Points average	Points	Champions
Cumberland	2	2	0	0	28	21	7	1.33	4	Cumberland
Lancashire	2	1	0	1	53	33	20	1.61	2	
Yorkshire	2	0	0	2	33	60	-27	0.55	0	

Rugby League County Championship table 1964–1965
County	Matches played	Won	Drawn	Lost	Points for	Points against	Points difference	Points average	Points	Champions
Yorkshire	2	2	0	0	47	16	31	2.94	4	Yorkshire
Cumberland	2	1	0	1	19	25	-6	0.76	2	
Lancashire	2	0	0	2	21	46	-25	0.46	0	

Rugby League County Championship table 1965–1966
County	Matches played	Won	Drawn	Lost	Points for	Points against	Points difference	Points average	Points	Champions
Cumberland	2	2	0	0	33	14	19	2.36	4	Cumberland
Yorkshire	2	1	0	1	19	32	-13	0.59	2	
Lancashire	2	0	0	2	24	30	-6	0.8	0	

Rugby League County Championship table 1966–1967
County	Matches played	Won	Drawn	Lost	Points for	Points against	Points difference	Points average	Points	Champions
Cumberland	2	1	1	0	35	31	4	1.13	3	Cumberland
Lancashire	2	1	0	1	36	35	1	1.03	2	
Yorkshire	2	0	1	1	34	39	-5	0.87	1	

Rugby League County Championship table 1967–1968
County	Matches played	Won	Drawn	Lost	Points for	Points against	Points difference	Points average	Points	Champions
Lancashire	2	2	0	0	42	23	19	1.83	4	Lancashire
Yorkshire	2	1	0	1	51	46	5	1.11	2	
Cumberland	2	0	0	2	29	53	-24	0.55	0	

Rugby League County Championship table 1968–1969
County	Matches played	Won	Drawn	Lost	Points for	Points against	Points difference	Points average	Points	Champions
Yorkshire	2	2	0	0	33	15	18	2.2	4	Yorkshire
Lancashire	2	1	0	1	29	29	0	1	2	
Cumberland	2	0	0	2	29	47	-18	0.62	0	

Rugby League County Championship table 1969–1970
County	Matches played	Won	Drawn	Lost	Points for	Points against	Points difference	Points average	Points	Champions
Lancashire	2	2	0	0	44	22	22	2	4	Lancashire
Yorkshire	2	1	0	1	54	17	37	3.18	2	
Cumberland	2	0	0	2	13	72	-59	0.18	0	

Rugby League County Championship table 1970–1971
County	Matches played	Won	Drawn	Lost	Points for	Points against	Points difference	Points average	Points	Champions
Yorkshire	2	1	0	1	47	33	14	1.42	2	Yorkshire beat Lancashire in play-off match
Lancashire	2	1	0	1	40	37	3	1.08	2	
Cumberland	2	1	0	1	26	43	-17	0.6	2	

Rugby League County Championship table 1971–1972
County	Matches played	Won	Drawn	Lost	Points for	Points against	Points difference	Points average	Points	Champions
Yorkshire	2	2	0	0	59	34	25	1.74	4	Yorkshire
Cumberland	2	1	0	1	29	24	5	1.21	2	
Lancashire	2	0	0	2	29	59	-30	0.49	0	

Rugby League County Championship table 1972–1973
County	Matches played	Won	Drawn	Lost	Points for	Points against	Points difference	Points average	Points	Champions
Yorkshire	2	1	0	1	46	41	5	1.12	2	Yorkshire beat Cumberland in play-off match
Cumberland	2	1	0	1	39	40	-1	0.98	2	
Lancashire	2	1	0	1	44	48	-4	0.92	2	

Rugby League County Championship table 1973–1974
County	Matches played	Won	Drawn	Lost	Points for	Points against	Points difference	Points average	Points	Champions
Lancashire	2	2	0	0	35	21	14	1.67	4	Lancashire
Yorkshire	2	1	0	1	52	29	23	1.79	2	
Cumbria	2	0	0	2	18	55	-37	0.33	0	

Rugby League County Championship table 1974–1975
County	Matches played	Won	Drawn	Lost	Points for	Points against	Points difference	Points average	Points	Champions
Lancashire	3	2	0	1	57	37	20	1.54	4	Lancashire
Yorkshire	3	2	0	1	49	39	10	1.26	4	
Cumbria	3	2	0	1	33	48	-15	0.69	4	
Other Nationalities	3	0	0	3	40	55	-15	0.73	0	

Rugby League County Championship table 1975–1976
County	Matches played	Won	Drawn	Lost	Points for	Points against	Points difference	Points average	Points	Champions
Yorkshire	3	2	1	0	43	30	13	1.43	5	Yorkshire
Lancashire	3	2	0	1	65	41	24	1.59	4	
Cumbria	3	1	0	2	45	45	0	1	2	
Other Nationalities	3	0	1	2	36	73	-37	0.49	1	

Rugby League County Championship table 1976–1977
County	Matches played	Won	Drawn	Lost	Points for	Points against	Points difference	Points average	Points	Champions
Yorkshire	2	1	1	0	30	25	5	1.2	3	Yorkshire
Lancashire	2	1	0	1	31	32	-1	0.97	2	
Cumbria	2	0	1	1	26	30	-4	0.87	1	

Rugby League County Championship table 1978–1979
County	Matches played	Won	Drawn	Lost	Points for	Points against	Points difference	Points average	Points	Champions
Lancashire	2	1	0	1	38	23	15	1.65	2	Lancashire
Yorkshire	2	1	0	1	44	32	12	1.38	2	
Cumbria	2	1	0	1	25	52	-27	0.48	2	

Rugby League County Championship table 1979–1980
County	Matches played	Won	Drawn	Lost	Points for	Points against	Points difference	Points average	Points	Champions
Lancashire	2	1	0	1	39	34	5	1.15	2	Lancashire
Yorkshire	2	1	0	1	32	33	-1	0.97	2	
Cumbria	2	1	0	1	32	36	-4	0.89	2	

Rugby League County Championship table 1980–1981
County	Matches played	Won	Drawn	Lost	Points for	Points against	Points difference	Points average	Points	Champions
Cumbria	2	2	0	0	36	32	4	1.13	4	Lancashire
Lancashire	2	1	0	1	33	28	5	1.18	2	
Yorkshire	2	0	0	2	25	34	-9	0.74	0	

Rugby League County Championship table 1981–1982
County	Matches played	Won	Drawn	Lost	Points for	Points against	Points difference	Points average	Points	Champions
Cumbria	2	2	0	0	47	25	22	1.88	4	Lancashire
Yorkshire	2	1	0	1	31	35	-4	0.89	2	
Lancashire	2	0	0	2	30	48	-18	0.63	0	

Rugby League County Championship table 1982–1983
County	Matches played	Won	Drawn	Lost	Points for	Points against	Points difference	Points average	Points	Champions
Yorkshire	2	2	0	0	44	28	16	1.57	4	Lancashire
Lancashire	2	1	0	1	67	30	37	2.23	2	
Cumbria	2	0	0	2	15	68	-53	0.22	0	

== Results ==
Rugby League County Championship scores by season
**Bold text** denotes winning team
Season	Date	Venue	Home team	Score	Away team
1895–1896	21 October 1895	Edgeley Park, Stockport	Cheshire	0–6	**Lancashire**
1895–1896	25 November 1895	Headingley, Leeds	Yorkshire	5–9	**Cheshire**
1895–1896	7 December 1895	Watersheddings, Oldham	Lancashire	0–8	**Yorkshire**
1895–1896	29 January 1896	Wheater's Field, Broughton	**Lancashire**	3–0	Cheshire
1895–1896	12 February 1896	Irwell Lane, Runcorn	Cheshire	6–16	**Yorkshire**
1895–1896	29 February 1896	Fartown, Huddersfield	Yorkshire	3–8	**Lancashire**
1896–1897	17 October 1896	Edgeley Park, Stockport	Cheshire	0–8	**Lancashire**
1896–1897	7 November 1896	The Boulevard, Hull	**Yorkshire**	17–10	Cheshire
1896–1897	21 November 1896	Watersheddings, Oldham	**Lancashire**	7–3	Yorkshire
1897–1898	16 October 1897	Watersheddings, Oldham	**Lancashire**	11–10	Cheshire
1897–1898	6 November 1897	Edgeley Park, Stockport	Cheshire	3–22	**Yorkshire**
1897–1898	20 November 1897	Park Avenue, Bradford	**Yorkshire**	7–6	Lancashire
1898–1899	15 October 1898	Edgeley Park, Stockport	**Cheshire**	5–4	Lancashire
1898–1899	29 October 1898	Valley Parade, Bradford	**Yorkshire**	14–2	Cheshire
1898–1899	5 November 1898	New Barnes, Salford	Lancashire	9–20	**Yorkshire**
1898–1899	19 November 1898	Irwell Lane, Runcorn	**Cheshire**	4–3	Cumberland
1898–1899	3 December 1898	Lonsdale Park, Workington	**Cumberland**	13–3	Lancashire
1898–1899	28 January 1899	Clarence Field, Leeds	**Yorkshire**	8–5	Cumberland
1899–1900	30 September 1899	Recreation Ground, Whitehaven	**Cumberland**	3–0	Cheshire
1899–1900	21 October 1899	Watersheddings, Oldham	**Lancashire**	17–7	Cumberland
1899–1900	28 October 1899	Park Station, Birkenhead	**Cheshire**	9–8	Yorkshire
1899–1900	4 November 1899	Thrum Hall, Halifax	Yorkshire	13–16	**Lancashire**
1899–1900	20 November 1899	Chorley Road, Swinton	**Lancashire**	6–0	Cheshire
1899–1900	25 November 1899	Salthouses, Millom	Cumberland	5–7	**Yorkshire**
1900-1901	20 October 1900	Belle Vue, Wakefield	**Yorkshire**	40–0	Cheshire
1900-1901	20 October 1900	Lonsdale Park, Workington	Cumberland	2–21	**Lancashire**
1900-1901	3 November 1900	The Athletic Grounds, Rochdale	**Lancashire**	24–5	Yorkshire
1900-1901	10 November 1900	Park Station, Birkenhead	**Cheshire**	11–3	Cumberland
1900-1901	8 December 1900	Edgeley Park, Stockport	Cheshire	0–30	**Lancashire**
1900-1901	15 December 1900	The Boulevard, Hull	**Yorkshire**	10–5	Cumberland
1901–1902	26 October 1901	Wheater's Field, Broughton	Lancashire	8–8	Cheshire
1901–1902	2 November 1901	The Athletic Ground, Maryport	Cumberland	5–16	**Yorkshire**
1901–1902	30 November 1901	Edgeley Park, Stockport	**Cheshire**	13–2	Yorkshire
1901–1902	14 December 1901	Recreation Ground, Whitehaven	Cumberland	0–14	**Cheshire**
1901–1902	11 January 1902	Cavendish Park, Barrow	**Lancashire**	19–3	Cumberland
1901–1902	15 February 1902	The Boulevard, Hull	**Yorkshire**	13–8	Lancashire
1902–1903	18 October 1902	Lonsdale Park, Workington	**Cumberland**	5–0	Durham and Northumberland
1902–1903	25 October 1902	Irwell Lane, Runcorn	Cheshire	3–11	**Lancashire**
1902–1903	1 November 1902	Headingley, Leeds	**Yorkshire**	29–2	Cumberland
1902–1903	15 November 1902	The Willows, Salford	**Lancashire**	13–0	Yorkshire
1902–1903	29 November 1902	Park Avenue, Bradford	Yorkshire	7–10	**Cheshire**
1902–1903	10 December 1902	Wheater's Field, Broughton	**Lancashire**	10–5	Durham and Northumberland
1902–1903	20 December 1902	Park Station, Birkenhead	**Cheshire**	14–2	Cumberland
1902–1903	1 January 1903	Horsley Stadium, South Shields	**Durham and Northumberland**	4–0	Cheshire
1902–1903	10 January 1903	Salthouses, Millom	Cumberland	3–21	**Lancashire**
1902–1903	14 April 1903	Horsley Stadium, South Shields	Durham and Northumberland	0–8	**Yorkshire**
1903–1904	14 October 1903	The Athletic Ground, Maryport	Cumberland	8–9	**Cheshire**
1903–1904	28 October 1903	Belle Vue, Wakefield	**Yorkshire**	25–13	Durham and Northumberland
1903–1904	28 October 1903	Wheater's Field, Broughton	**Lancashire**	16–5	Cheshire
1903–1904	5 November 1903	Lonsdale Park, Workington	Cumberland	0–11	**Yorkshire**
1903–1904	14 November 1903	Headingley, Leeds	Yorkshire	0–8	**Lancashire**
1903–1904	25 November 1903	Irwell Lane, Runcorn	Cheshire	8–24	**Yorkshire**
1903–1904	25 November 1903	Horsley Stadium, South Shields	**Durham and Northumberland**	12–9	Cumberland
1903–1904	9 December 1903	Horsley Stadium, South Shields	Durham and Northumberland	0–42	**Lancashire**
1903–1904	13 January 1904	Central Park, Wigan	**Lancashire**	15–0	Cumberland
1903–1904	25 February 1904	Prenton Park, Birkenhead	**Cheshire**	8–4	Durham and Northumberland
1904–1905	13 October 1904	Prenton Park, Birkenhead	**Cheshire**	5–2	Cumberland
1904–1905	26 October 1904	Irwell Lane, Runcorn	**Cheshire**	3–0	Lancashire
1904–1905	1 November 1904	Mount Pleasant, Batley	**Yorkshire**	18–3	Cumberland
1904–1905	12 November 1904	Watersheddings, Oldham	Lancashire	5–14	**Yorkshire**
1904–1905	24 November 1904	The Boulevard, Hull	**Yorkshire**	12–0	Cheshire
1904–1905	16 January 1905	Recreation Ground, Whitehaven	**Cumberland**	11–0	Lancashire
1905–1906	7 October 1905	Central Park, Wigan	Lancashire	3–3	Cumberland
1905–1906	4 November 1905	The Boulevard, Hull	Yorkshire	0–8	**Lancashire**
1905–1906	13 January 1906	Recreation Ground, Whitehaven	**Cumberland**	5–0	Yorkshire
1905–1906	21 February 1906 (Note: After the scheduled three games the Championship was tied between Lancashire and Cumberland, a play-off fixture was arranged to decide the winners but as this game also ended in a draw the title was awarded jointly to both counties.)	Central Park, Wigan	Lancashire	3–3	Cumberland
1906–1907	6 October 1906	The Athletic Ground, Maryport	Cumberland	4–15	**Lancashire**
1906–1907	3 November 1906	The Willows, Salford	**Lancashire**	19–0	Yorkshire
1906–1907	12 January 1907	Fartown, Huddersfield	**Yorkshire**	15–12	Cumberland
1907–1908	5 October 1907	Wheater's Field, Broughton	Lancashire	3–7	**Cumberland**
1907–1908	19 October 1907	Recreation Ground, Whitehaven	**Cumberland**	7–3	Yorkshire
1907–1908	2 November 1907	Thrum Hall, Halifax	**Yorkshire**	15–11	Lancashire
1908–1909	3 October 1908	Lonsdale Park, Workington	Cumberland	8–15	**Lancashire**
1908–1909	17 October 1908	Fartown, Huddersfield	**Yorkshire**	30–0	Cumberland
1908–1909	31 October 1908	The Willows, Salford	**Lancashire**	13–0	Yorkshire
1909–1910	4 October 1909	Cavendish Park, Barrow	Lancashire	3–8	**Cumberland**
1909–1910	23 October 1909	The Athletic Ground, Maryport	Cumberland	A–A (Note: Match abandoned after 47 minutes due to bad weather with Yorkshire leading 5–3. Fixture was not replayed as the counties could not agree on a venue.)	Yorkshire
1909–1910	4 November 1909	The Boulevard, Hull	**Yorkshire**	27–14	Lancashire
1910–1911	25 October 1910	Crown Flatt, Dewsbury	**Yorkshire**	28–11	Cumberland
1910–1911	7 November 1910	Central Park, Wigan	**Lancashire**	17–3	Yorkshire
1910–1911	24 November 1910	Lonsdale Park, Workington	Cumberland	8–13	**Lancashire**
1911–1912	9 November 1911	Wilderspool, Warrington	Lancashire	7–28	**Cumberland**
1911–1912	9 December 1911	Salthouses, Millom	**Cumberland**	16–13	Yorkshire
1911–1912	25 January 1912	Thrum Hall, Halifax	Yorkshire	12–13	**Lancashire**
1912–1913	28 October 1912	Lonsdale Park, Workington	**Cumberland**	11–0	Lancashire
1912–1913	5 December 1912	Craven Street, Hull	**Yorkshire**	19–5	Cumberland
1912–1913	16 December 1912	Watersheddings, Oldham	Lancashire	8–20	**Yorkshire**
1913–1914	29 September 1913	The Cliff, Broughton	**Lancashire**	24–3	Cumberland
1913–1914	11 October 1913	Lonsdale Park, Workington	**Cumberland**	8–3	Yorkshire
1913–1914	10 December 1913	Fartown, Huddersfield	**Yorkshire**	19–11	Lancashire
1919–1920	24 September 1919	The Cliff, Broughton	**Lancashire**	15–5	Yorkshire
1919–1920	22 October 1919	Parkside, Hunslet	**Yorkshire**	25–9	Cumberland
1919–1920	8 November 1919	Salthouse Road, Millom	**Cumberland**	5–3	Lancashire
1920–1921	6 October 1920	Knowsley Road, St Helens	**Lancashire**	16–12	Cumberland
1920–1921	21 October 1920	The Boulevard, Hull	**Yorkshire**	18–3	Lancashire
1920–1921	6 November 1920	Netherton, Maryport	Cumberland	6–27	**Yorkshire**
1921–1922	4 October 1921	The Athletic Grounds, Rochdale	Lancashire	2–5	**Yorkshire**
1921–1922	14 November 1921	Thrum Hall, Halifax	**Yorkshire**	30–12	Cumberland
1921–1922	21 January 1922	Ellenborough, Maryport	Cumberland	7–18	**Yorkshire**
1922–1923	28 October 1922	Sandy Lonning, Maryport	Cumberland	4–9	**Yorkshire**
1922–1923	15 November 1922	Chorley Road, Swinton	**Lancashire**	46–9	Cumberland
1922–1923	7 December 1922	Craven Park, Hull	Yorkshire	11–11	Lancashire
1923–1924	29 September 1923	Recreation Ground, Whitehaven	Cumberland	5–24	**Lancashire**
1923–1924	17 October 1923	Parkside, Hunslet	**Yorkshire**	51–12	Cumberland
1923–1924	8 December 1923	Watersheddings, Oldham	**Lancashire**	6–5	Yorkshire
1924–1925	18 October 1924	Recreation Ground, Whitehaven	**Cumberland**	20–0	Yorkshire
1924–1925	29 October 1924	Wilderspool, Warrington	**Lancashire**	8–0	Cumberland
1924–1925	29 November 1924	Thrum Hall, Halifax	Yorkshire	9–28	**Lancashire**
1925–1926	26 September 1925	Recreation Ground, Whitehaven	Cumberland	5–6	**Lancashire**
1925–1926	28 October 1925	Fartown, Huddersfield	Yorkshire	13–31	**Cumberland**
1925–1926	12 December 1925	City Road, St Helens	**Lancashire**	26–10	Yorkshire
1926–1927	16 October 1926	Recreation Ground, Whitehaven	**Cumberland**	17–5	Yorkshire
1926–1927	30 October 1926	Belle Vue, Wakefield	Yorkshire	13–18	**Lancashire**
1926–1927	23 March 1927	The Willows, Salford	**Lancashire**	12–5	Cumberland
1927–1928	24 September 1927	Recreation Ground, Whitehaven	**Cumberland**	27–2	Lancashire
1927–1928	26 September 1927	Parkside, Hunslet	**Yorkshire**	20–12	Glamorgan and Monmouthshire
1927–1928	15 October 1927	Taff Vale Park, Pontypridd	Glamorgan and Monmouthshire	12–18	**Cumberland**
1927–1928	29 October 1927	Wilderspool, Warrington	**Lancashire**	35–19	Yorkshire
1927–1928	12 November 1927	Taff Vale Park, Pontypridd	**Glamorgan and Monmouthshire**	12–7	Lancashire
1927–1928	30 November 1927	Belle Vue, Wakefield	Yorkshire	5–11	**Cumberland**
1928–1929	28 October 1928	Recreation Ground, Whitehaven	**Cumberland**	15–5	Glamorgan and Monmouthshire
1928–1929	3 November 1928	Thrum Hall, Halifax	Yorkshire	10–33	**Lancashire**
1928–1929	17 November 1928	Station Road, Swinton	**Lancashire**	10–5	Cumberland
1928–1929	8 December 1928	Mather Lane, Leigh	**Lancashire**	25–10	Glamorgan and Monmouthshire
1928–1929	26 January 1929	Recreation Ground, Whitehaven	Cumberland	P–P (Note: Match postponed due to a frozen pitch and not re-arranged.)	Yorkshire
1928–1929	15 April 1929	White City Stadium, Cardiff	Glamorgan and Monmouthshire	17–22	**Yorkshire**
1929–1930	26 October 1929	Recreation Ground, Whitehaven	Cumberland	7–15	**Lancashire**
1929–1930	21 December 1929	White City Stadium, Cardiff	Glamorgan and Monmouthshire	6–14	**Cumberland**
1929–1930	22 January 1930	Fartown, Huddersfield	**Yorkshire**	9–3	Cumberland
1929–1930	26 February 1930	Parkside, Hunslet	Yorkshire	6–13	**Glamorgan and Monmouthshire**
1929–1930	22 March 1930	The Athletic Grounds, Rochdale	**Lancashire**	18–3	Yorkshire
1929–1930	29 April 1930	Wilderspool, Warrington	**Lancashire**	29–3	Glamorgan and Monmouthshire
1930–1931	20 September 1930	Recreation Ground, Whitehaven	Cumberland	4–5	**Yorkshire**
1930–1931	4 October 1930	Wilderspool, Warrington	**Lancashire**	24–17	Cumberland
1930–1931	18 October 1930	Belle Vue, Wakefield	**Yorkshire**	25–15	Lancashire
1930–1931	22 November 1930	The Willows, Salford	Lancashire	10–14	**Glamorgan and Monmouthshire**
1930–1931	21 March 1931	Recreation Ground, Whitehaven	Cumberland	12–19	**Glamorgan and Monmouthshire**
1930–1931	15 April 1931	Thrum Hall, Halifax	**Yorkshire**	33–12	Glamorgan and Monmouthshire
1931–1932	3 October 1931	Recreation Ground, Whitehaven	Cumberland	11–17	**Lancashire**
1931–1932	17 October 1931	Wilderspool, Warrington	**Lancashire**	11–8	Yorkshire
1931–1932	28 October 1931	Clarence Street, York	Yorkshire	20–35	**Cumberland**
1932–1933	1 October 1932	Recreation Ground, Whitehaven	**Cumberland**	39–10	Yorkshire
1932–1933	15 October 1932	Craven Park, Barrow	Lancashire	3–9	**Cumberland**
1932–1933	29 October 1932	Belle Vue, Wakefield	**Yorkshire**	30–3	Lancashire
1933–1934	25 September 1933	Watersheddings, Oldham	Lancashire	12–15	**Yorkshire**
1933–1934	28 October 1933	Lonsdale Park, Workington	**Cumberland**	10–0	Lancashire
1933–1934	6 December 1933	Crown Flatt, Dewsbury	Yorkshire	11–15	**Cumberland**
1934–1935	22 September 1934	Craven Park, Barrow	Lancashire	5–15	**Cumberland**
1934–1935	29 September 1934	Recreation Ground, Whitehaven	**Cumberland**	10–0	Yorkshire
1934–1935	9 January 1935	Headingley, Leeds	Yorkshire	5–5	Lancashire
1935–1936	21 September 1935	Recreation Ground, Whitehaven	Cumberland	5–7	**Lancashire**
1935–1936	12 October 1935	Naughton Park, Widnes	**Lancashire**	16–5	Yorkshire
1935–1936	23 October 1935	Odsal, Bradford	Yorkshire	15–19	**Cumberland**
1936–1937	10 October 1936	Lonsdale Park, Workington	**Cumberland**	16–10	Yorkshire
1936–1937	21 October 1936	Wheldon Road, Castleford	Yorkshire	6–28	**Lancashire**
1936–1937	31 October 1936	Knowsley Road, St Helens	**Lancashire**	18–10	Cumberland
1937–1938	18 September 1937	Borough Park, Workington	Cumberland	17–23	**Lancashire**
1937–1938	10 November 1937	Parkside, Hunslet	Yorkshire	7–7	Cumberland
1937–1938	12 February 1938	The Athletic Grounds, Rochdale	**Lancashire**	10–9	Yorkshire
1938–1939	14 September 1938	Central Park, Wigan	**Lancashire**	8–7	Cumberland
1938–1939	1 October 1938	Lonsdale Park, Workington	**Cumberland**	16–6	Yorkshire
1938–1939	26 October 1938	Headingley, Leeds	Yorkshire	10–10	Lancashire
1945–1946	31 October 1945	Headingley, Leeds	**Yorkshire**	45–3	Cumberland
1945–1946	10 November 1945	Station Road, Swinton	**Lancashire**	17–16	Yorkshire
1945–1946	26 January 1946	Borough Park, Workington	Cumberland	3–18	**Lancashire**
1946–1947	26 September 1946	Borough Park, Workington	Cumberland	9–11	**Lancashire**
1946–1947	9 November 1946	Parkside, Hunslet	**Yorkshire**	13–10	Lancashire
1946–1947	4 January 1947	Craven Park, Barrow	Lancashire	0–0	Cumberland
1947–1948	22 October 1947	Headingley, Leeds	Yorkshire	7–15	**Cumberland**
1947–1948	12 November 1947	Central Park, Wigan	**Lancashire**	22–10	Yorkshire
1947–1948	15 May 1948	Derwent Park, Workington	Cumberland	13–20	**Lancashire**
1948–1949	6 April 1949	Borough Park, Workington	**Cumberland**	14–0	Yorkshire
1948–1949	20 April 1949	The Willows, Salford	Lancashire	9–15	**Cumberland**
1948–1949	3 May 1949	Thrum Hall, Halifax	Yorkshire	3–12	**Lancashire**
1949–1950	26 September 1949	The Boulevard, Hull	**Yorkshire**	21–8	Cumberland
1949–1950	5 October 1949	Wilderspool, Warrington	**Lancashire**	22–13	Yorkshire
1949–1950	12 October 1949	Borough Park, Workington	**Cumberland**	22–11	Lancashire
1950–1951	27 September 1950	Recreation Ground, Whitehaven	**Cumberland**	10–5	Yorkshire
1950–1951	18 October 1950	Fartown, Huddersfield	**Yorkshire**	23–15	Lancashire
1950–1951	14 May 1951	Craven Park, Barrow	**Lancashire**	13–12	Cumberland
1951–1952	1 October 1951	Craven Park, Hull	**Yorkshire**	25–3	Cumberland
1951–1952	10 October 1951	Kirkstall Lane, Leigh	Lancashire	5–15	**Yorkshire**
1951–1952	12 May 1952	Recreation Ground, Whitehaven	Cumberland	11–19	**Lancashire**
1952–1953	29 September 1952	Borough Park, Workington	**Cumberland**	8–7	Yorkshire
1952–1953	8 October 1952	Knowsley Road, St Helens	**Lancashire**	41–14	Cumberland
1952–1953	28 April 1953	The Boulevard, Hull	**Yorkshire**	16–8	Lancashire
1953–1954	21 September 1953	Recreation Ground, Whitehaven	**Cumberland**	15–5	Lancashire
1953–1954	5 October 1953	Boothferry Park, Hull	**Yorkshire**	16–7	Cumberland
1953–1954	14 October 1953	Hilton Park, Leigh	**Lancashire**	18–10	Yorkshire
1953–1954	29 March 1954 (Note: Championship play-off game arranged after each team won one game, Yorkshire and Cumberland had the better points difference than Lancashire)	Recreation Ground, Whitehaven	Cumberland	5–9	**Yorkshire**
1954–1955	30 August 1954	Derwent Park, Workington	Cumberland	0–27	**Yorkshire**
1954–1955	15 September 1954	Central Park, Wigan	**Lancashire**	24–7	Cumberland
1954–1955	6 October 1954	Odsal, Bradford	**Yorkshire**	20–10	Lancashire
1955–1956	19 September 1955	Derwent Park, Workington	Cumberland	18–20	**Lancashire**
1955–1956	26 September 1955	Watersheddings, Oldham	**Lancashire**	26–10	Yorkshire
1955–1956	5 October 1955	Odsal, Bradford	**Yorkshire**	14–2	Cumberland
1956–1957	6 September 1956	Central Park, Wigan	**Lancashire**	42–21	Cumberland
1956–1957	19 September 1956	Recreation Ground, Whitehaven	**Cumberland**	15–14	Yorkshire
1956–1957	26 September 1956	The Boulevard, Hull	Yorkshire	21–35	**Lancashire**
1957–1958	11 September 1957	The Boulevard, Hull	**Yorkshire**	27–18	Cumberland
1957–1958	16 September 1957	Derwent Park, Workington	**Cumberland**	22–12	Lancashire
1957–1958	23 September 1957	Naughton Park, Widnes	Lancashire	11–25	**Yorkshire**
1958–1959	10 September 1958	Central Park, Wigan	**Lancashire**	60–12	Cumberland
1958–1959	15 September 1958	Recreation Ground, Whitehaven	**Cumberland**	29–7	Yorkshire
1958–1959	24 September 1958	Craven Park, Hull	**Yorkshire**	35–19	Lancashire
1958–1959	29 October 1958 (Note: Championship play-off game arranged after each team won one game. Yorkshire and Lancashire had the better points difference than Cumberland)	Hilton Park, Leigh	Lancashire	15–16	**Yorkshire**
1959–1960	31 August 1959	Derwent Park, Workington	**Cumberland**	14–8	Lancashire
1959–1960	16 September 1959	The Boulevard, Hull	Yorkshire	13–26	**Cumberland**
1959–1960	11 November 1959	Hilton Park, Leigh	Lancashire	28–38	**Yorkshire**
1960–1961	31 August 1960	Belle Vue, Wakefield	Yorkshire	20–21	**Lancashire**
1960–1961	14 September 1960	Recreation Ground, Whitehaven	**Cumberland**	43–19	Yorkshire
1960–1961	27 May 1961	The Willows, Salford	**Lancashire**	32–18	Cumberland
1961–1962	11 September 1961	Belle Vue, Wakefield	Yorkshire	8–23	**Cumberland**
1961–1962	18 September 1961	Derwent Park, Workington	**Cumberland**	21–18	Lancashire
1961–1962	9 October 1961	Hilton Park, Leigh	**Lancashire**	14–12	Yorkshire
1962–1963	12 September 1962	Naughton Park, Widnes	**Lancashire**	28–8	Cumberland
1962–1963	19 September 1962	Derwent Park, Workington	Cumberland	2–11	**Yorkshire**
1962–1963	26 September 1962	Belle Vue, Wakefield	**Yorkshire**	22–8	Lancashire
1963–1964	11 September 1963	Knowsley Road, St Helens	**Lancashire**	45–20	Yorkshire
1963–1964	25 September 1963	Belle Vue, Wakefield	Yorkshire	13–15	**Cumberland**
1963–1964	2 October 1963	Recreation Ground, Whitehaven	**Cumberland**	13–8	Yorkshire
1964–1965	9 September 1964	Recreation Ground, Whitehaven	Cumberland	6–14	**Yorkshire**
1964–1965	16 September 1964	Borough Park, Blackpool	Lancashire	11–13	**Cumberland**
1964–1965	23 September 1964	The Boulevard, hull	**Yorkshire**	33–10	Lancashire
1965–1966	8 September 1965	Craven Park, Hull	Yorkshire	3–19	**Cumberland**
1965–1966	20 September 1965	Recreation Ground, Whitehaven	**Cumberland**	14–11	Lancashire
1965–1966	10 November 1965	Station Road, Swinton	Lancashire	13–16	**Yorkshire**
1966–1967	7 September 1966	Derwent Park, Workington	Cumberland	17–17	Yorkshire
1966–1967	21 September 1966	Headingley, Leeds	Yorkshire	17–22	**Lancashire**
1966–1967	12 October 1966	Wilderspool, Warrington	Lancashire	14–18	**Cumberland**
1967–1968	12 September 1967	Derwent Park, Workington	Cumberland	6–19	**Lancashire**
1967–1968	25 October 1967	Wheldon Road, Castleford	**Yorkshire**	34–23	Cumberland
1967–1968	24 January 1968	Naughton Park, Widnes	**Lancashire**	23–17	Yorkshire
1968–1969	11 September 1968	Recreation Ground, Whitehaven	Cumberland	10–23	**Yorkshire**
1968–1969	25 September 1968	Craven Park, Hull	**Yorkshire**	10–5	Lancashire
1968–1969	6 November 1968	Knowsley Road, St Helens	**Lancashire**	24–19	Cumberland
1969–1970	3 September 1969	The Willows, Salford	**Lancashire**	14–12	Yorkshire
1969–1970	24 September 1969	Derwent Park, Workington	Cumberland	10–30	**Lancashire**
1969–1970	1 October 1969	Craven Park, Hull	**Yorkshire**	42–3	Cumberland
1970–1971	14 September 1970	Recreation Ground, Whitehaven	**Cumberland**	21–15	Yorkshire
1970–1971	11 November 1970	Craven Park, Barrow	**Lancashire**	28–5	Cumberland
1970–1971	13 January 1971	Wheldon Road, Castleford	**Yorkshire**	32–12	Lancashire
1970–1971	24 February 1971 (Note: Championship play-off game arranged after each team won one game. Yorkshire and Lancashire had the better points difference than Cumberland)	Wheldon Road, Castleford	**Yorkshire**	34–8	Lancashire
1971–1972	15 September 1971	Derwent Park, Workington	**Cumberland**	17–7	Lancashire
1971–1972	29 September 1971	Hilton Park, Leigh	Lancashire	22–42	**Yorkshire**
1971–1972	20 October 1971	Belle Vue, Wakefield	**Yorkshire**	17–12	Cumberland
1972–1973	13 September 1972	Recreation Ground, Whitehaven	**Cumberland**	23–14	Yorkshire
1972–1973	27 September 1972	Wilderspool, Warrington	**Lancashire**	26–16	Cumberland
1972–1973	11 October 1972	Wheldon Road, Castleford	**Yorkshire**	32–18	Lancashire
1972–1973	17 January 1973 (Note: Championship play-off game arranged after each team won one game. Yorkshire and Cumberland had the better points difference than Lancashire)	Headingley, Leeds	**Yorkshire**	40–7	Cumberland
1973–1974	5 September 1973	Craven Park, Barrow (Note: Under the changes to the political geography of England introduced by the Local Government Act 1972, Cumberland became a part of the new county of Cumbria along with all of Westmorland and the part of Lancashire containing Barrow. Craven Park, Barrow therefore became a home venue for Cumbria, not Lancashire)	Cumbria	6–18	**Lancashire**
1973–1974	12 September 1973	McLaren Field, Bramley	**Yorkshire**	37–12	Cumbria
1973–1974	19 September 1973	Naughton Park, Widnes	**Lancashire**	17–15	Yorkshire
1974–1975	11 September 1974	The Willows, Salford	**Lancashire**	14–13	Other Nationalities
1974–1975	11 September 1974	Derwent Park, Workington	**Cumbria**	10–7	Yorkshire
1974–1975	18 September 1974	Wilderspool, Warrington	**Lancashire**	29–4	Cumbria
1974–1975	18 September 1974	Craven Park, Hull	**Yorkshire**	22–15	Other Nationalities
1974–1975	25 September 1974	Lawkholme Lane, Keighley	**Yorkshire**	20–14	Lancashire
1974–1975	25 September 1974	Recreation Ground, Whitehaven	**Cumbria**	19–12	Other Nationalities
1974–1975	16 October 1974	Naughton Park, Widnes	**Lancashire**	29–11	Yorkshire
1975–1976	19 November 1975	Crown Flatt, Dewsbury	**Yorkshire**	10–7	Cumbria
1975–1976	25 November 1975	Knowsley Road, St Helens	**Lancashire**	36–7	Other Nationalities
1975–1976	6 December 1975	Derwent Park, Workington	Cumbria	17–22	**Lancashire**
1975–1976	6 December 1975	Odsal, Bradford	Yorkshire	16–16	Other Nationalities
1975–1976	20 December 1975	Central Park, Wigan	Lancashire	7–17	**Yorkshire**
1975–1976	20 December 1975	Craven Park, Barrow	**Cumbria**	21–13	Other Nationalities
1976–1977	2 February 1977	Hilton Park, Leigh	**Lancashire**	18–14	Cumbria
1976–1977	15 February 1977	Recreation Ground, Whitehaven	Cumbria	12–12	Yorkshire
1976–1977	1 March 1977	Wheldon Road, Castleford	**Yorkshire**	18–13	Lancashire
1978–1979	20 September 1978	The Boulevard, Hull	**Yorkshire**	37–9	Cumbria
1978–1979	27 September 1978	Naughton Park, Widnes	**Lancashire**	23–7	Yorkshire
1978–1979	11 October 1978	Recreation Ground, Whitehaven	**Cumbria**	16–15	Lancashire
1979–1980	29 August 1979	Derwent Park, Workington	**Cumbria**	17–13	Yorkshire
1979–1980	5 September 1979	Knowsley Road, St Helens	**Lancashire**	23–15	Cumbria
1979–1980	12 September 1979	Wheldon Road, Castleford	**Yorkshire**	19–16	Lancashire
1980–1981	3 September 1980	Craven Park, Barrow	**Cumbria**	19–16	Lancashire
1980–1981	17 September 1980	Craven Park, Hull	Yorkshire	16–17	**Cumbria**
1980–1981	24 September 1980	Naughton Park, Widnes	**Lancashire**	17–9	Yorkshire
1981–1982	9 September 1981	Wheldon Road, Castleford	**Yorkshire**	21–15	Lancashire
1981–1982	16 September 1981	Central Park, Wigan	Lancashire	15–27	**Cumbria**
1981–1982	23 September 1981	Recreation Ground, Whitehaven	**Cumbria**	20–10	Yorkshire
1982–1983	23 May 1982	Wheldon Road, Castleford	**Yorkshire**	22–7	Cumbria
1982–1983	26 May 1982	Hilton Park, Leigh	Lancashire	21–22	**Yorkshire**
1982–1983	30 May 1982	Derwent Park, Workington	Cumbria	8–46	**Lancashire**

== Statistics ==
Rugby League County Championship statistics by county
County		Matches played	Won	Drawn	Lost	Points for	Points against	Points difference
Cheshire	Championship	31	13	1	17	167	310	-143
Cumberland / Cumbria	Championship	159	64	5	85	1813	2441	-628
Cumberland / Cumbria	Play-off	3	0	1	2	15	52	-37
Cumberland / Cumbria	County total	162	64	6	87	1828	2493	-665
(Durham, England) Durham and Northumberland	Championship	8	2	0	6	38	107	-69
(Monmouthshire (historic)) Glamorgan and Monmouthshire	Championship	18	4	0	8	135	211	-76
Lancashire	Championship	169	97	6	64	2641	2011	+630
Lancashire	Play-off	4	1	1	2	55	64	-9
Lancashire	County total	173	98	7	66	2696	2075	+621
Other Nationalities	Championship	6	0	1	5	76	128	-52
Yorkshire	Championship	167	82	7	77	2635	2187	+338
Yorkshire	Play-off	5	4	0	1	110	64	+46
Yorkshire	County total	172	86	7	78	2635	2251	+384
