= George Dickenson =

GB & England international rugby league footballer

Personal information
- Full name: George Thomas Dickenson
- Born: first ¼ 1882 Warrington, England
- Died: June 1953 (aged 71) Warrington, England

Playing information
- Position: Centre
Club
Years	Team	Pld	T	G	FG	P
1900–14	Warrington	375	94	5	9	310
Representative
Years	Team	Pld	T	G	FG	P
1904–09	England	4	0	0	0	0
1908	Great Britain	1	0	0	0	0
1902–03	Lancashire	3	0	0	0	0

George Dickenson (first ¼ 1882 – June 1953) was an English professional rugby league footballer who played in the 1900s and 1910s. He played at representative level for Great Britain and England, and at club level for Warrington, as a centre.

== Background ==
George Dickenson's birth was registered in Warrington, Lancashire, and his death aged 71 was registered in Warrington, Lancashire, England.

== Playing career ==
=== Challenge Cup Final appearances ===
Dickenson played in Warrington's 0–6 defeat by Batley in the 1900–01 Challenge Cup Final during the 1900–01 season at Headingley, Leeds on Saturday 27 April 1901, in front of a crowd of 29,563, played in the 3–8 defeat by Halifax in the 1903–04 Challenge Cup Final during the 1903–04 season at The Willows, Salford on Saturday 30 April 1904, in front of a crowd of 17,041, and played in the 6–0 victory over Hull Kingston Rovers in the 1904–05 Challenge Cup Final during the 1904–05 season at Headingley, Leeds on Saturday 29 April 1905, in front of a crowd of 19,638.

=== County Cup Final appearances ===
Dickenson played, and scored a try in Warrington's 6-15 defeat by Broughton Rangers in the 1906 Lancashire Cup Final during the 1906–07 season at Central Park, Wigan on Saturday 1 December 1906.

=== Notable tour matches ===
Dickenson played at centre, and scored a goal in Warrington's 10-3 victory over Australia in the 1908–09 Kangaroo tour of Great Britain tour match during the 1908–09 season at Wilderspool Stadium, Warrington, Saturday 14 November 1908, in front of a crowd of 5,000, due to the strikes in the cotton mills, the attendance was badly affected, the loss of earnings meant that some fans could not afford to watch the first tour by the Australian rugby league team.

=== International honours ===
Dickenson won caps for England while at Warrington in 1904 against Other Nationalities, in 1908 against Wales (2 matches), in 1909 against Australia, and won a cap for Great Britain while at Warrington in 1908 against Australia.

== Honours ==
Dickenson became a Warrington Hall of Fame inductee in 2012.
