= Wilf Auty =

English rugby union & league player and coach

- Pictured in February 1921 when he was Vice-President of the Batley club
- Full name: Frederic Wilfrid Hoyle Auty
- Born: 28 February 1881 Dewsbury district, England
- Died: 15 February 1951 (aged 69) Batley, England
- Notable relative: Dick Auty (son)

Rugby union career
Senior career
Years	Team	Apps	(Points)
≤1896	Rosslyn Park F.C.	2	
Coaching career
- Years: Team
- Headingley RFC
- Rugby league career

Playing information
- Position: Wing, Centre
Club
Years	Team	Pld	T	G	FG	P
1898–04	Batley	118	24	5	2	86
Representative
Years	Team	Pld	T	G	FG	P
1901–02	Yorkshire	2	1	0	0	3

Frederic Wilfrid "Wilf" Hoyle Auty (28 February 1881 – 15 February 1951), also known by the nickname of "The Emperor", was an English rugby union, and amateur rugby league footballer who played as a winger or centre in the 1890s and 1900s, and rugby union coach of the 1900s, and 1910s.

He played club level rugby union (RU) for Rosslyn Park F.C., and representative level rugby league (RL) for Yorkshire, and at club level for Batley, and he coached club level rugby union (RU), and was a member of the committee for Headingley RFC.

== Background ==
Wilf Auty's birth was registered in Dewsbury district, West Riding of Yorkshire, England. He was a pupil at Mill Hill School, London, aged 17 he joined his father's textile company; Joseph Auty & Co, Clerk Green, Batley.

He was first elected to Batley Town Council in 1910, he served as a Councillor until 1922 when, within the space of 5 weeks, the deaths occurred of both his younger brother Joseph Speight Auty (13 January 1884 – 27 March 1922 (aged 38)), and his father, also Joseph (23 July 1847 – 2 May 1922 (aged 74)), which prompted Wilf Auty's retirement from Batley Town Council. Following his father's death, aged 41 he became the chairman of the textile company founded by his father, he served on the committee, and he was the chairman, of the Batley and Birstall Chamber of Commerce, he returned to Batley Town Council in 1941, and he was the Mayor of Batley twice; in 1943 and 1944, his father having been Mayor in 1892-83, and his older sister, Margaret Grace Auty, being Mayoress during the 1919-20 mayoralty of her husband, Herbert North. Wilf Auty was the president of the Batley Liberal Association, he was the Vice-President of the Batley Temperance Society, he was the Secretary of the National Commercial Temperance League, he was the President of the Batley Amateur Thespian Society, he was a Director of Batley rugby league club in the 1940s up to the time of his death in 1951, and also a past Vice-President, and member of the then Committee prior to the club becoming a limited company in 1922, but never held office as President or Chairman of the club, as incorrectly stated in the 'A Ton Full Of Memories' book published in 1986. He died aged 69 at his home; "Dryfield House", 207 Healey Lane, Batley, and his funeral service was held at Hanover Street Congregational Church, Batley on Monday 19 February 1951.

The Auty name will always be forever synonymous with Batley's Mount Pleasant ground as a company was formed to raise the sum to buy it, helped greatly by his father Alderman Joseph Auty, who agreed to donate money on the basis that no intoxicating liquor ever be sold at the ground. Wilf Auty was as keen in cricket as in any other form of sport, and he gained many honours, being the possessor of five Heavy Woollen Cup winners medals. He captained both Batley and Birstall cup winning teams, and his interest in both clubs led to him being termed a liaison between Batley and Birstall. He was president of the Heavy Woollen Cricket Cup Competition and practically left his bed to be present at Savile Town at the last final before his death to present the cup to Morley who had defeated Batley. He was also the district representative in the Yorkshire County Committee.

== Playing career ==
=== Club career ===
Wilf Auty made his rugby union début for the Rosslyn Park F.C. First XV, while still a schoolboy, aged 15 in c. 1896.

He made his rugby league (RL) début for Batley aged 17 on 17 September 1898 scoring a try in the 16-3 away win over Liversedge. He would eventually replace in the centre Dai Fitzgerald, who was suspended by the Northern Union (now known as the Rugby Football League (RFL)) from the end of 1898 until May 1900, as Fitzgerald's employment as a coal agent was not considered legitimate, and consequently he was in breach of the Northern Union's professionalism code, upon Fitzgerald's return from suspension, Wilf Auty moved to play as a wing. At 18 Wilf Auty won a Yorkshire Senior Competition Medal with Batley.

Wilf Auty played left wing, and scored a try in Batley's 6-0 victory over Warrington in the 1901 Challenge Cup Final during the 1900–01 season at Headingley, Leeds on Saturday 27 April 1901, in front of a crowd of 29,563.

=== County honours ===
Wilf Auty won 2 caps for Yorkshire (RL) while at Batley; he played left wing in the 3-13 defeat v Cheshire in the County Championship match during the 1901-02 season at Edgeley Park, Stockport on 30 November 1901 in front of a crowd of 4,500. He also played left wing, and scored a try in the 9-0 victory over Durham and Northumberland (predominantly players from South Shields) in a non-County Championship match during the 1901–02 season at The Boulevard, Hull on Saturday 25 January 1902, in front of a crowd of 4,000.

== Coaching career ==
=== Club career ===
Wilf Auty coached, and was a member of the committee, for Headingley RFC for ten years, and it was here that he gained the nickname of "The Emperor".

== Personal life ==
Wilf Auty was the son of Joseph Auty JP, and Lucy Anne (née Farrow), and he was the father of the rugby union fly-half of the 1930s for England, Yorkshire and Headingley RFC; Dick Auty.
