= Thomas Hockenhull =

England international rugby league footballer

Personal information
- Full name: Thomas Hockenhull
- Born: unknown
- Died: unknown

Playing information
- Position: Wing, Centre, Stand-off, Scrum-half
Club
Years	Team	Pld	T	G	FG	P
1899–09	Warrington	194	40	7	1	136
Representative
Years	Team	Pld	T	G	FG	P
1904–07	Lancashire	3
1906	England	1	0	0	0	0

Thomas Hockenhull (birth unknown – death unknown) was an English professional rugby league footballer who played in the 1890s and 1900s. He played at representative level for England and Lancashire, and at club level for Latchford Rangers ARLFC, Warrington, as a wing, centre, stand-off, or scrum-half.

== Playing career ==
=== Club career ===
Tom Hockenhull played in the centre when Warrington beat Widnes 7–2 in the final of the South West Lancashire Cup on 29 April 1902, his wing Jackie Fish scored the only try of the match, played scrum-half in Warrington's 2nd Challenge Cup final a loss to Halifax 3–8 on 30 April 1904, played scrum-half in Warrington's first Lancashire Cup final appearance on 1 December 1907, a 6–15 loss to Broughton Rangers at Central Park, Wigan, played as a stand-off and scored the last try by picking up a loose ball and chipping over the defence and hacking the ball over the line before touching down in the 17–3 victory over Oldham in the 1906–07 Challenge Cup Final during the 1906–07 season at Wheater's Field, Broughton, Salford on Saturday 27 April 1907, in front of a crowd of 18,500.

Tom Hockenhull made 194 appearances, scoring 40 tries, kicking 7 goals and dropping one goal for 136 points.

Tom Hockenhull score 3 hat-tricks of tries: the first in a 20–0 win over Batley at Wilderspool on 16 January 1904. in a 52–0 win over Liverpool on 18 February 1907, he also kicked one of the only two conversions as Warrington scored 16 tries. on 16 March 1907 in a 34-9 Challenge Cup win over Batley at Wilderspool.

In the 1906/7 season he scored 16 tries.

Tom Hockenhull was club captain for the 1907/8 season, but did not play a match that season.

=== Representative honours ===
Tom Hockenhull won a cap for England while at Warrington in 1906 against Other Nationalities, in the same match as Warrington teammate Jackie Fish broke a leg.

Tom Hockenhull made 3 appearances for Lancashire, 2 in the 1904/5 season and one in 1906/7.

== Note ==
Tom Hockenhull's surname is variously spelt with a u as Hockenhull, and with an a as Hockenhall,
