= County Championship (disambiguation) =

The County Championship is the domestic first-class cricket competition in England and Wales.

County Championship may also refer to:

== England and Wales ==
- The County Championship (rugby league), a defunct rugby league competition in England held between 1895 and 1983
- The County Championship (rugby union), an annual rugby union competition in England between teams representing English counties
- The Women's County Championship, a 50-over limited overs cricket competition organised by the England and Wales Cricket Board and the equivalent of the (men's) County Championship

== Ireland ==
- All-Ireland Senior Football Championship, contested by the top inter-county teams
- All-Ireland Senior Hurling Championship, contested by the top inter-county teams
