= Challenge Cup records =

Rugby league competition

The Challenge Cup records are statistics for a knockout rugby football league cup competition. The Challenge Cup rugby tournament is organised by the Rugby Football League.

== Final records ==
=== Team ===
- Most wins: 21 by Wigan
- Most finals: 30 by Wigan
- Highest winning score: Leeds Rhinos 52 v London Broncos 16 in 1999.
- Lowest winning score: Broughton Rangers 4 v Wigan 0 in 1911
- Widest margin: Leeds Rhinos 50 v Hull Kingston Rovers 0 in 2015
- Most points aggregate: 72 by St. Helens 40 v Bradford Bulls 32 in 1996
- Least points aggregate: 4 by Broughton Rangers 4 v Wigan 0 in 1911
- Most tries by one team: 9, by Huddersfield v St. Helens in 1915, Leeds Rhinos v London Broncos in 1999, and Leeds Rhinos v Hull Kingston Rovers in 2015
- Consecutive wins and finals: 8 by Wigan from 1988 to 1995
- Consecutive final defeats: 3 by Hull (1908–10) and Leeds (2010-2012)
- Most tries aggregate: 13 by St. Helens (8) v Bradford Bulls (5) in 1996
- Biggest attendance: 102,569 Warrington v. Halifax (replay) at Odsal Stadium, Bradford in 1954

=== Individual ===
- Most appearances: 11 by Shaun Edwards (Wigan – 1984, 85, 88, 89, 90, 91, 92, 93, 94, 95; London Broncos – 1999)
- Most wins: 9 by Shaun Edwards – (Wigan – 1985, 88, 89, 90, 91, 92, 93, 94, 95)
- Most goals: 8, by Cyril Kellett (Featherstone Rovers v Bradford Northern in 1973), and Iestyn Harris (Leeds Rhinos v London Broncos in 1999)
- Most tries: 5 by Tom Briscoe (Leeds Rhinos v Hull KR in 2015)
- Most points: 20, (2 tries, 7 goals) by Neil Fox (Wakefield Trinity v Hull in 1960), 20, (1 try, 8 goals) by Iestyn Harris (Leeds Rhinos v London Broncos in 1999) and 20, (5 tries) by Tom Briscoe (Leeds Rhinos v Hull KR in 2015)
- Most goals in all finals: 23 by Kevin Sinfield, (Leeds, 2003 - 4, 2005 - 4, 2010 - 1, 2011 - 1, 2012 - 3, 2014 - 3, 2015 - 7)
- Most tries in all finals: 8 by Tom Briscoe (Leeds, 2014 - 1, 2015 - 5, 2020 - 1, Leigh, 2023 - 1)
- Most points in all finals: 46 by Frano Botica (Wigan, 1991 – 8pts, 1992 – 10pts, 1993 – 8pts, 1994 – 10pts, 1995 – 10 pts) and Kevin Sinfield, (Leeds, 2003 - 8pts, 2005 - 8pts, 2010 - 2pts, 2011 - 2pts, 2012 - 6pts, 2014 - 6pts, 2015 - 14pts)

== Round records ==
=== Team ===
- Highest score: York City Knights 132 v Northumbria University 0 2011
- Longest unbeaten run: 43 by Wigan (42 victories and 1 draw)

=== Individual ===
- Most goals in a match: 22 by Jim Sullivan (Wigan v. Flimby and Fothergill) in 1925
- Most tries in a match: 11 by George West (Hull Kingston Rovers v. Brookland Rovers in 1905)
- Most points in a match: 56 (4 tries, 20 goals) by Chris Thorman (York City Knights v. Northumbria University in 2011)

== See also ==
- Rugby league in the British Isles
- Rugby league in England
- Rugby league in Ireland
- Rugby league in Scotland
- Rugby league in Wales
- Rugby League International Federation
- Rugby League European Federation
