= George West (rugby league) =

English rugby league footballer

George "Tich" West

Personal information
- Full name: George Henry West
- Born: 1881 Beverley, England
- Died: 18 May 1927 (aged 45) Beverley, England

Playing information
- Height: 5 ft 6 in (1.68 m)
- Weight: 10 st 0 lb (64 kg)
- Position: Wing
Club
Years	Team	Pld	T	G	FG	P
1900–08	Hull Kingston Rovers	218	98	45	0	384
Representative
Years	Team	Pld	T	G	FG	P
1903–05	Yorkshire	2	2	0	0	6

George Henry "Tich" West (1881 – 18 May 1927) was an English professional rugby league footballer who played in the 1890s and 1900s. He played at representative level for Yorkshire, and at club level for Beverley Victoria ARLFC, Beverley Town ARLFC (nicknamed "The Beavers" after the Beverley coat of arms), and Hull Kingston Rovers (captain), as a goal-kicking wing.

== Background ==
George "Tich" West's birth was registered in Beverley, East Riding of Yorkshire, England, and he died aged c. 46–47 in Beverley.

== Playing career ==
Hull Daily Mail postcard featuring George "Tich" West

=== County honours ===
George "Tich" West played for Yorkshire while at Hull Kingston Rovers; he played on the wing (in a 12-player team with only one centre), and scored two tries in the 24-6 victory over Cheshire in the 1903–04 County Championship match during the 1903–04 season at Irwell Lane, Runcorn on Wednesday 25 November 1903, and he played on the wing in the 0-6 defeat by Lancashire in the 1905–06 County Championship match during the 1905–06 season at The Boulevard, Kingston upon Hull on Saturday 4 November 1905.

=== Challenge Cup Final appearances ===
George "Tich" West played on the wing in Hull Kingston Rovers' 0-6 defeat by Warrington in the 1905 Challenge Cup Final during the 1904–05 season at Headingley, Leeds on Saturday 29 April 1905, in front of a crowd of 19,638.

=== Club career ===
George "Tich" West made his début for Hull Kingston Rovers against Dewsbury on Good Friday 13 April 1900, he was described as being ‘fast and elusive’, he played his last match for Hull Kingston Rovers against Batley at Craven Street, Kingston upon Hull on Saturday 10 October 1908, during this match he sustained a badly broken leg, and consequently he was unable to play competitive rugby league again.

=== Career records ===
George "Tich" West holds British rugby league's and the Challenge Cup's "most tries in a match" record, he scored 11-tries in Hull Kingston Rovers' 73-5 victory over Brookland Rovers ARLFC (in Maryport, Cumberland) in the 1905 Challenge Cup match at Craven Street, Kingston upon Hull (Brookland Rovers ARLFC had relinquished home advantage) on Saturday 4 March 1905, he also previously held British rugby league's and the Challenge Cup's "most points in a match" record with 53-points; he scored 11-tries and 10-goals in Hull Kingston Rovers' 73-5 victory over Brookland Rovers ARLFC (in Maryport, Cumberland) in the 1905 Challenge Cup match at Craven Street, Kingston upon Hull (Brookland Rovers ARLFC had relinquished home advantage) on Saturday 4 March 1905, this was extended by Chris Thorman to 54-points; he scored four tries and 19-goals in York City Knights' 132-0 victory over Northumbria University in the 2011 Challenge Cup at Huntington Stadium, York (Northumbria University had relinquished home advantage) on Sunday 6 March 2011, these 54-points were scored in the 4-point try era which would have been worth "only" 50-points back in the pre-1983–84 season 3-point try era.

== Outside of rugby league ==
George "Tich" West was the landlord of The Lichfield Arms Hotel (aka The Red Lion), 30 Toll Gavel, Beverley c. 1921–27.
