= Hockenhull (surname) =

Hockenhull is a surname. Notable people with the surname include:

- Andrew W. Hockenhull, American politician
- Ben Hockenhull, British footballer
- Georgina Hockenhull, British gymnast
- James Hockenhull, British army officer
- Ross Hockenhull, British racing driver
- Thomas Hockenhull, English rugby player

== See also ==
- Hockenhull
