= Joe Richardson (rugby league) =

English rugby league footballer

Personal information
- Full name: Joseph Richardson
- Born: c. 1877 Runcorn district, Cheshire, England
- Died: 19 November 1904 (aged 27) Runcorn district, Cheshire, England

Playing information
- Position: Stand-off, Scrum-half
Club
Years	Team	Pld	T	G	FG	P
≤1904–04	Runcorn RFC
Representative
Years	Team	Pld	T	G	FG	P
1900–04	Cheshire	14	3	0	0	9

Joseph Richardson (c. 1877 – 19 November 1904) was an English professional rugby league footballer who played in the 1900s. He played at representative level for Cheshire, and at club level for Runcorn RFC, as a stand-off or scrum-half.

== Background ==
Joe Richardson's birth was registered in Runcorn district, Cheshire. He was taken ill while travelling by train to play Hull F.C. at The Boulevard, Kingston upon Hull on Saturday 5 November 1904, and died two weeks later from pleurisy and pneumonia.

== Playing career ==
=== County honours ===
Joe Richardson won cap(s) for Cheshire while at Runcorn RFC, including; the 3-0 victory over Lancashire at Canal Street, Runcorn on Wednesday 26 October 1904.
