= Samuel Houghton =

England international rugby union & rugby league footballer

Sam Houghton
Personal information
- Full name: Samuel Houghton
- Born: 16 August 1870 Runcorn, Cheshire, England
- Died: 17 August 1920 (aged 50) Runcorn, Cheshire, England

Playing information

Rugby union
- Position: Fullback
Club
| Years | Team | Pld | T | G | FG | P |
|---|---|---|---|---|---|---|
| ≤1892–≥92 | Runcorn RFC |
| ≤1895–96 | Birkenhead Wanderers |
| | Total | 0 | 0 | 0 | 0 | 0 |
Representative
| Years | Team | Pld | T | G | FG | P |
| | Cheshire |
| 1892–96 | England | 2 | 0 | 0 | 0 | 0 |

Rugby league
- Position: Back
Club
| Years | Team | Pld | T | G | FG | P |
|---|---|---|---|---|---|---|
| 1896–1904 | Runcorn RFC |
Representative
| Years | Team | Pld | T | G | FG | P |
| 1896–1904 | Cheshire | 15 | 1 | 1 | 0 | 5 |

Samuel Houghton (16 August 1870 – 17 August 1920) was an English rugby union and professional rugby league footballer who played in the 1890s and 1900s. He played representative level rugby union (RU) for England and Cheshire, and at club level for Runcorn RFC, and Birkenhead Wanderers, as a fullback. and representative level rugby league (RL) for Cheshire, and at club level for Runcorn RFC, who he rejoined in January 1896, and who had switched to professional rugby league in 1895.

== Background ==
Sam Houghton was born in Runcorn, Cheshire, England, and he also died in Runcorn, Cheshire, England.

== International honours ==
Sam Houghton won first selected to play for England (RU), while representing Runcorn at club level, for the encounter against Ireland in the 1892 Home Nations Championship. Despite England winning 7–0, Houghton was replaced for the next match of the tournament by Thomas Coop, who himself was uncapped before the match. It would take almost four years for Houghton to win his second cap, when he was chosen for the 1896 Home Nations Championship. This was a key match for England, as it was the first international after the formation of the Northern League, and the selectors were now unable to call upon a large number of former players who had now turned professional. Houghton by this time had switched clubs from Runcorn to Birkenhead Wanderers, and on 4 January 1896 he was called upon to face Wales in the opening game of the Championship, the match was a one-sided affair after the talented Welsh three-quarters, Owen Badger, broke his collar bone within the first fifteen minutes and was forced to leave the pitch. England went on to win 25–0.

Despite being called back into the England team, and then being selected for the second match of the 1896 Championship against Ireland, Houghton switched codes before the 1 February fixture, joining his old club Runcorn. Runcorn who were previously a union team had turned professional in 1895, and by signing back to the club, Houghton was now considered a professional footballer, and could therefore never represent a rugby union team at club, county, or country level.
