= Dick Auty =

English rugby union player (1910–1995)

- Full name: Joseph Richard Auty
- Born: 19 August 1910 Batley, England
- Died: 7 June 1995 (aged 84) Leeds, England
- School: Mill Hill School
- Notable relative: Wilf Auty (father)
- Occupation: Wool manufacturer

Rugby union career
- Position: Stand-off
International career
Years	Team	Apps	(Points)
1935	England	1	(0)

Joseph Richard Auty (19 August 1910 – 7 June 1995) was an English international rugby union player.

Born in Batley, Auty was the son of local identify Wilf Auty, a rugby footballer who played for Yorkshire. Both his father and grandfather served as mayors of Batley. He was educated at Mill Hill School and earned England Public Schools representative honours, playing alongside his friend Douglas Bader.

Auty, a stand-off, possessed a good dummy and side-step. He played most of his rugby with Headingley, which he captained to a dominant 29-win season in 1933–34. His solitary England cap came against Scotland at Murrayfield in the 1935 Home Nations. He also played for the Barbarians, Leicester and Yorkshire.

== See also ==
- List of England national rugby union players
