= Dick Padbury =

GB & England international rugby league footballer

Personal information
- Full name: Richard Padbury
- Born: 16 February 1886; Runcorn district, England
- Died: 28 February 1967 (aged 81); Weston, Runcorn, Cheshire, England

Playing information
- Position: Forward
Club
| Years | Team | Pld | T | G | FG | P |
|---|---|---|---|---|---|---|
| 1903–18 | Runcorn RFC |
Representative
| Years | Team | Pld | T | G | FG | P |
| 1904 | Cheshire | 2 | 0 | 0 | 0 | 0 |
| 1906–10 | Lancashire | 6 | 0 | 0 | 0 | 0 |
| 1908 | Great Britain | 1 | 0 | 0 | 0 | 0 |
| 1908–12 | England | 4 | 2 | 0 | 0 | 6 |

Richard Padbury (16 February 1886 – 28 February 1967) was an English professional rugby league footballer who played in the 1900s and 1910s. He played at representative level for Great Britain, England and Cheshire, and at club level for Runcorn RFC, as a forward.

== Background ==
Dick Padbury's birth was registered in Runcorn district, Cheshire, England.

== Playing career ==
=== Club career ===
Padbury made his debut for Runcorn in October 1903 against Halifax. He went on to make over 260 appearances for the club, playing his last game in 1918.

=== International honours ===
Padbury won caps for England while at Runcorn RLFC in 1908 against Wales, and New Zealand, in 1909 against Wales, and in 1912 against Wales, and won a cap for Great Britain while at Runcorn RLFC playing as a forward in the 6–5 victory over Australia during the 1908–09 Kangaroo tour of Great Britain at Villa Park on 10 February 1909.

He was considered a "Probable" for the 1910 Great Britain Lions tour of Australia and New Zealand, but ultimately he was not selected for the tour.
