= Lonsdale Park =

Former multi-use sports venue

Lonsdale Park West Cumberland Stadium
- Location: Black Path, Workington, Cumberland, England
- Coordinates: 54°38′52″N 3°32′55″W
- Opened: 10 September 1892
- Closed: 1999

Lonsdale Park also known as West Cumberland Stadium was a stadium, now demolished, used for greyhound racing, football and for motorcycle racing in Workington, Cumberland.

== Origins ==
Lonsdale Park was constructed as a rugby football ground in an area known as Cloffocks on the south bank of the River Derwent and on the north side of Black Path.

The ground officially opened on 10 September 1892, when Workington RFC moved from their Valentine Ground to a newly built enclosure on the Cloffocks, which they named Lonsdale Park.

== Association football ==
Lonsdale Park was also used by Workington A.F.C. from 1909, when the team moved from their Ashfield Ground. In May 1937, Workington A.F.C. were forced to move because the stadium was leased to a Scottish greyhound and speedway company. They moved to their new Borough Park ground built next door on the west side of Lonsdale Park.

== Greyhound racing ==
Greyhound racing first started at Lonsdale Park on 27 May 1933. However in October 1933, the White City Sports Stadium Preston Ltd who had taken out the lease on Lonsdale Park and started to build a track and kennels, suspended operations due to financial difficulties. Shortly afterwards a new company called Lonsdale Park Greyhound Racing Stadium Ltd, led by Directors Arthur Crosby, Frank Marsh and William Smith, took over. Smith had also been involved with the previous company. A new grand opening resulted during February 1934.

The stadium came under new management again in 1942. The racing was independent (unaffiliated to a governing body).

In the 1960s racing was on Monday and Saturday nights at 7.00pm over distances of 320 and 500 yards. The track circumference was a large 440 yards and an 'Inside Sumner' hare system was used. The principal race was the Workington Derby and amenities included a members club and snack bar.

By the late 1980s the distances were 320, 530 and 760 yards, there were kennels on site for 50 greyhounds and a car park for 200 vehicles. Facilities included three bars and a covered stand.

== Speedway ==
Speedway took place at the stadium 1931-1932 and again from 1937-1938.

== Closure ==
The greyhound racing ended in 1999 when Cumbrian engineer Ernie Little pulled out of the track, having spent £38,000 in just two years in an attempt to keep the venue going. His wife Jan would apply for a trainer's license elsewhere. The site was later demolished.

== Future ==
On 30 October 2018, the former Lonsdale Park site was sold to Allerdale Borough Council for £210,000. The council acquired the site to build the proposed new Workington Community Stadium.
