= Wilderspool =

Coordinates: 53.378°N 2.587°W

Wilderspool is a district of Warrington, Cheshire, England, near the town centre. It consists of Wilderspool Causeway and the streets coming off it, the limits being the Manchester Ship Canal into Stockton Heath (where it turns into London Road), Bridgefoot (near the town centre), and Centre Park. The district incorporates Priestley College, Wilderspool depot (owned by Warrington's Own Buses), a Morrisons supermarket, and the Riverside Retail Park. Excavations in the area have shown Roman settlement, and there are parts of a walled town with evidence of industrial activity. It was also the site of the Greenall Whitley brewery and Wilderspool Stadium, former home of Warrington Rugby League Football Club.
