= Craven Street Football Ground =

Sports venue in Hull, England

- Location: Craven Street, Hull
- Coordinates: 53°45′01″N 0°18′44″W
- Opened: 1894
- Closed: c.1939

Craven Street Football Ground was a rugby league and a short lived greyhound racing and Association Football stadium located on Craven Street in Hull.

== Rugby League ==
Hull Kingston Rovers played their first games at the ground from 1895 until 1922 when they moved to a bigger stadium at Old Craven Park with better facilities.

== Association Football ==
The Hull Albany Association Football Club first used the ground in late 1894 shortly after it was constructed. Junior and school teams used the ground before World War II.

== Greyhound racing ==
The East Hull Sports Stadium Company opened for racing on Saturday 13 October 1934 and also hosted whippets. The racing was independent (not affiliated to the sports governing body the National Greyhound Racing Club) but only lasted until c.1937. Reduced admission prices were offered for people producing an unemployment card.

== Closure ==
After World War II the ground had been demolished and converted into a timber yard. It is likely to have closed c.1939.
