= Runcorn RFC =

Defunct English amateur rugby league club

Runcorn FC
Club information
- Full name: Runcorn Football Club
- Nickname: Linnets
- Founded: some time before 1876
- Exited: 1918

Former details
- Ground: Canal Street

Uniforms
Home colours

Runcorn FC was a rugby league club. Having formed in 1876 and played rugby union as members of the RFU, they joined the Northern Union in 1895, just several days after it was founded, and played in the league from 1895–96 to 1917–18.

The club was based in Runcorn, an industrial town and cargo port in Cheshire, England, on the southern bank of the River Mersey opposite Widnes.

== History ==
=== Rugby Union days ===
In the summer of 1885, the club carried out a tour of South Wales.

In 1886, Runcorn played Warrington in the semi-final of the South West Lancashire and Border Towns Trophy. A fight between players on the pitch resulted in a player from each side being sent off. Some time later during the match, a Runcorn player was injured and when the referee refused to allow this injured player to be replaced by the previously sent off player, the Runcorn team walked off the field. At this point, the referee abandoned the match. The Cup competition committee decided that the match should be replayed. Warrington duly won this match at Southport. It was 1891 before the animosity between the clubs subsided sufficiently for them to recommence playing each other.

In March 1889, Runcorn, at the time Cheshire champions, played the touring New Zealand Maoris team before a crowd of about 9,000 at Irwell Lane Enclosure. Runcorn were led at the time by regular captain Hughie Hughes.

Club Colours Amber & Black (1876-1884) Myrtle Green (1884-1918)

Ground Irwell Lane Enclosure

=== Runcorn join the Northern Union ===
Leading up to the "Great Schism", twelve of the top Yorkshire clubs held a meeting on Tuesday, 20 August 1895, at the Mitre Hotel, Leeds, at which they agreed that they should meet with the Rugby Union to put forward the idea of forming a Northern Union, not as a complete breakaway, but a suggestion which the Union immediately rejected out of hand.

On 27 August 1895 an emergency meeting of nine Lancashire clubs agreed to support their Yorkshire counterparts if they decided to break away. Runcorn was not among the nine.

Two days later on the 29 August, the representatives of these 21 clubs (by this time, Stockport had joined the others, but their representative, being unable to attend, had telegraphed the meeting requesting his club’s admission to the new organisation) met in The George Hotel, Huddersfield in the West Riding of Yorkshire, a setting which was to become famous (or infamous) in the world of rugby. And all but Dewsbury agreed to the break-away.

A further meeting was held several days later, to formalise the agreement, at which Runcorn applied to join the Northern Union, and was admitted, becoming the twenty-second member in the inaugural season's league

=== Northern Union ===
The first Northern Union season (1895–96) started on Saturday, 7 September, and Runcorn’s first match was a home game against Widnes which they won, 15–4. All 22 clubs played in a combined league, yet games against clubs in the same county were also used to provide the two separate county leagues. Runcorn finished in third position overall, and also won the Lancashire league title (Manningham won the Rugby League title and were also Yorkshire Champions, with Halifax finishing in second positions in both these competitions).

For the following five seasons (1896–97 to 1900–01 inclusive), the two counties were kept apart, each having their own Senior Competition; this after comments or complaints from several clubs about the expenses in travelling long(ish) distances. Runcorn finished in 4th, 10th, 7th, 1st and 3rd positions respectively. At the end of the 1900–01 season, the top seven clubs in each of the county leagues decided to break away and form a single division, and Runcorn, after finishing in 3rd position, were among this group of clubs. In season 1901–02, Runcorn finished again in 3rd position.

This formula was successful and for the following season, a second division was also formed. Runcorn remained in the top league (Division 1) of the competition which ran in this format for the next three seasons (1902–03 to 1904–05) after which the two divisions were combined. In these seasons Runcorn finishing in 4th, 16th and 18th (bottom) position.

The following season (1905–06) one single division operated, a format which would continue for many years, thus removing the possibility of Runcorn being relegated. As it was impossible for all the clubs to play each other both home and away, clubs from the same county played each other home and away, and arranged inter-county matches as and when they could. Because not all clubs played the same number of matches, positions were decided on percentage basis. Runcorn finished 10th out of the 31 clubs.

In 1906–07, Runcorn finished in 3rd position, their highest placing for several years, and a position, which history would show, was the start of a rapid decline in the club’s playing fortunes. Although in 1907, Runcorn defeated the New Zealand All Golds 9-0 in a famous game played in driving rain.

In the next eight seasons (1907–08 to 1914–15) Runcorn finished 13th, 11th, 16th, 22nd, 24th, 19th, 21st and 25th respectively. In this last season (1914–15) Runcorn finished in a very poor bottom position with no wins, only one draw and 1 point from 27 matches.

By this time the country was involved in the First World War and sporting competitions were being cancelled/abandoned. Rugby League was no exception, yet managed to organise a friendly series of Wartime Emergency Leagues. Several clubs withdrew for the duration, and some later re-joined; but those competing did so on a very limited scale, all organising their own fixtures, usually against local rivals to cut down on the travelling. Runcorn had a very poor return for their efforts finishing in 23rd out of 24 (1915–16), 22nd out of 26 (1916–17) and 21st out of 22 (1917–18). In these three seasons, Runcorn struggled, winning only five matches out of 51.

The club folded in August 1918 season.

With the full resumption of the league competition in 1919–20 Warrington signed many of the players from the recently disbanded Runcorn club.

=== Players of note ===
These include :

- Jim Butterworth, England international
- Sam Houghton (b in Runcorn – d 1920 in Runcorn) played for Runcorn at both rugby union, and professional rugby league, and for England, and Cheshire at Rugby Union
- Jim Jolley was an English professional rugby league footballer playing for Runcorn and later Warrington as a stand-off at club level and Great Britain, and England circa 1908–1909 at international level)
- Alf Kennedy, England international
- Dick Padbury (b 1886 in Runcorn district) played for Runcorn RFC, as a prop, or hooker and England
- Joe Richardson (b circa 1877 - d November 1904) halfback who also played for Cheshire
- Harry Speakman (b 1864 in Runcorn – d 1915 Townsville, Australia) was a fine player who never played for his country. He took part in the first (unofficial) 1888 British Lions (rugby union) tour to New Zealand, and Australia, from which he never returned, instead choosing to stay, and in doing so, help to develop the game in Australia.
- Samuel Sam Walker. England international
- Edgar Wrigley (b 1886 in Masterton, New Zealand - d 1958 (aged 71) in Huddersfield, England) dual-code international rugby union, and rugby league footballer

=== Club colours ===
The club played in all myrtle green.

=== Grounds ===
The Rugby club played at Canal Street (also known as Irwell Lane)

When the Runcorn RFC failed to survive the ravages of the First World War, the ground was purchased by a Mr. R H Posnett, the owner of Highfield and Camden Tannery, and the works recreation club founded as Runcorn Football Club in 1918.

Coincidentally, Huyton Rugby League Club, seeking to relocate from their ground in Liverpool, moved to Canal Street under a ground sharing agreement with Runcorn F C, changing their name to Runcorn Highfield RLFC, from season 1985–86 to 1989–90 inclusive

At the end of the 1999–2000 season, the football club, struggling with massive debts and dwindling attendances, sold the ground and moved to Stobart Stadium, home of Widnes Vikings Rugby League Club, for several years before finally closing after season 2005–06.

The ground itself, by now in a dilapidated and a dangerous condition, was sold to developers and is now a housing development, the Linnets Park housing estate

== Successor clubs ==
As mentioned above, Huyton RLFC changed their name to Runcorn Highfield and played in Runcorn between seasons 1985–86 to 1989–90 inclusive, ground sharing with Runcorn FC, using the same Canal Street ground

Runcorn ARLFC played in Runcorn in the early 2000s, moving from the start of the 2009–10 summer season (their 5th in the Summer Conference) to the Pavilions ground, on the Eastern end of Sandy Lane (between Western Point Expressway and Picow Farm Road), Runcorn. Before that they had played at various grounds including at Moore, they currently play at the heath playing fields. They currently play in the 4th division of the North West counties league.

== Records ==
=== Club Scoring Record ===
In a Match
Record	Date	Score	Opponent	Competition	Notes	Ref
Record victory						
Record defeat						
highest score in a match						

In a Season
	Details	Season	Competition	Notes	Ref
Highest League Position	1	1895–96	RL	out of 22 clubs	
Also finished top of the Lancashire section during the very first season (1895–96), but only third overall out of 22 clubs					
Lowest League Position	25	1914–15	RL	out of 25 clubs	
and	18	1904–05	Div 1	out of 18 clubs	
Most League Points (actual)	28	1987–88	Div 2	out of possible 56	
and as a % of possible	46 (88.46%)	1899–1900	LSC	out of possible 52	
Least League Points	1 (1.85%)	1914–15	RL	out of possible 54	
Most Points Scored (PF)	546	1906–07	RL	in 30 games	
Most Points Conceded (PA)	590	1914–15	RL	in 27 games	
Least Points Scored (PF)	37	1915–16	WEL	in 23 games	
Least Points Conceded (PA)	33	1899–1900	LSC	in 26 games	
Best Points Difference	330	1906–07	RL	in 30 games	
Worst Points Difference	−506	1914–15	RL	in 25 games	

=== Club Trophies ===
- Lancashire Senior Competition – winners 1899–1900
- Lancashire League (within the Rugby League) – winners 1895–96
- Rugby League table – 3rd place 1895–96, 1900–01 and 1906–07
- Championship play-off – losing semi-finalist 1906–07 (to Oldham 11–3)

=== Players Records ===
No records available

== Club League Record ==
Season	Competition	Pos	Team Name	Pl	W	D	L	PF	PA	Diff	Pts	%	No in league	Notes	Ref
1895–96	RL	3	Runcorn	42	24	8	10	314	143	171	56		22	1	
1896–97	LSC	4	Runcorn	26	13	5	8	134	62	72	31		14		
1897–98	LSC	10	Runcorn	26	9	2	15	142	184	−42	20		14		
1898–99	LSC	7	Runcorn	26	15	2	9	193	113	80	32		14		
1899–1900	LSC	1	Runcorn	26	22	2	2	232	33	199	46		14	1	
1900–01	LSC	3	Runcorn	26	20	0	6	240	100	140	40		14		
1901–02	RL	3	Runcorn	26	15	2	9	185	101	84	30	*	14	2,3	
1902–03	Div 1	4	Runcorn	34	19	4	11	239	139	100	42		18		
1903–04	Div 1	16	Runcorn	34	11	2	21	151	245	−94	24		18		
1904–05	Div 1	18	Runcorn	34	7	1	26	133	301	−168	15		18		
1905–06	RL	10	Runcorn	30	17	3	10	264	136	128	37	61.66	31		
1906–07	RL	3	Runcorn	30	23	0	7	546	216	330	46	76.66	26	4	
1907–08	RL	13	Runcorn	30	15	0	15	255	219	36	30	50	27		
1908–09	RL	11	Runcorn	28	16	1	11	271	191	80	33	58.92	31		
1909–10	RL	16	Runcorn	30	14	1	15	232	317	−85	29	48.33	28		
1910–11	RL	22	Runcorn	30	9	3	18	230	331	−101	21	35	28		
1911–12	RL	24	Runcorn	28	5	1	22	147	369	−222	11	19.64	27		
1912–13	RL	19	Runcorn	30	11	0	19	209	347	−138	22	36.66	26		
1913–14	RL	21	Runcorn	30	10	0	20	165	442	−277	20	33.33	25		
1914–15	RL	25	Runcorn	27	0	1	26	84	590	−506	1	1.85	25		
1915–16	WEL	23	Runcorn	14	1	2	11	37	192	−155	4	14.29	24		
1916–17	WEL	22	Runcorn	18	5	0	13	56	265	−209	10	27.78	26		
1917–18	WEL	21	Runcorn	19	1	0	18	51	277	−226	2	5.26	22		
1918–(Sep–Dec)	WEL		unknown												
1919–(Jan–Apr)			DNC												

Heading Abbreviations
Pl = Games played; W = Win; D = Draw; L = Lose; PF = Points for; PA = Points against; Diff = Points difference (+ or -); Pts = League Points
League points: for win = 2; for draw = 1; for loss = 0.

Notes

- 1 – Runcorn were Lancashire League Winners
- 2 – Salford, Runcorn, Bradford and Warrington each had 2 points deducted for a breach of the professional rules.
- 3 – 1901–02 also saw the introduction of the South West Lancashire League which ran until 1906–07. Only six teams competed (Wigan, Warrington, St Helens, Widnes, Leigh and Runcorn). They met home & away but if they met in the league that result counted towards the South West Lancashire League (indicated with SWLL on the List) – The SWLL was replaced by a full scale Lancashire league in 1907–08
- 4 – Championship Play-Off – Semifinals: Oldham (2nd) beat Runcorn (3rd) 11–3

== See also ==
- British rugby league system
- Canal Street Stadium, Runcorn
- The Great Schism – Rugby League View
- The Great Schism – Rugby Union View
- Rugby league county leagues
- List of defunct rugby league clubs
- Runcorn Highfield RLFC
- Runcorn F.C. Halton
- Runcorn Linnets F.C.
