= Canal Street (Runcorn) =

Sports stadium in Cheshire, England

Coordinates: 53.342°N 2.7224°W

Canal Street was a sports stadium used by Runcorn RFC and later Runcorn FC, in Canal Street, Runcorn, a town now within the borough of Halton in the ceremonial county of Cheshire, England, and on the southern bank of the River Mersey. It was also used for other sports.

== History ==
=== Rugby league ===
The first owners of the Canal Street ground were Runcorn RFC, a rugby union club formed sometime before 1886. In 1895 the club were one of the founders of the Northern Union, which later became the Rugby League.

The club suffered badly during World War I and failed to return to the league after hostilities ended.

=== Football ===
At this point the ground was purchased by a R H Posnett, the owner of a local tannery company and was used by the Highfield and Camden Tanneries Recreation Club, who became known as Runcorn FC from 1918). The club continued to be run under the overall control of the tanneries until the football club became a limited company in 1953.

=== Rugby league returns in ground share ===
Huyton Rugby League Club moved to Canal Street under a ground sharing agreement with the football club from 1984–85 to 1989–90, changing their name to Runcorn Highfield RLFC.

=== Decline ===
The football club had mixed success on the field, but in later years had problems with the ground, which by the 1990s was in need of major works. Disaster struck three times off the field during the 1993–94 season.

A first round FA Cup tie against Hull City, attracted a larger crowd than expected. A terrace wall collapsed following a Hull goal causing minor injuries to spectators.

Later in the season, the roof blew off a stand in high winds, and the main stand was gutted by fire.

With the club's precarious financial position, and the cost of rebuilding their Canal Street home, Runcorn suffered on the pitch, resulting in relegation, which was to be the start of a downhill spiral.

=== Closure ===
The last competitive game to be played at Canal Street was on 5 May 2001 and resulted in a defeat 2–1 by Gateshead. Runcorn player Liam Watson scored the club's final goal in this match.

At the end of the 2000–01 season, the football club, struggling with large debts and dwindling attendances, sold the ground and moved to Halton Stadium, home of Widnes Vikings Rugby League Club, where they stayed for several years before again struggling financially and ground sharing with Southport at Haig Avenue and Prescot Cables at Valerie Park, before finally folding at the end of the 2005–06 season.

The ground itself, by now in a dilapidated and a dangerous condition, was sold to developers and is now a housing development, the Linnets Park housing estate.

== Note ==
A brief scribbled note on an old programme mentions the name "Pavillions" as being the home of Runcorn RFC. This error is repeated in several books and websites. This ground is not related to Runcorn RFC or Canal Street.

It is in fact a recreation area on which sports are played and was used by Runcorn ARLFC, a junior team from the early 2000s, and who moved there from the start of the 2009-10 summer season (their 5th in the Summer Conference). It is on the Eastern end of Sandy Lane (between Western Point Expressway and Picow Farm Road), Runcorn.

Prior to that Runcorn ARLFC had played at various grounds including at Moore, and moved to Pavilions from the fields to the rear of The Heath School, off Clifton Road, where they had played the previous season (2008–09). The club website became static during season 2009-10 and the club appeared to fold.

== See also ==
Runcorn RFC
Runcorn Highfield RLFC
British rugby league system
1985–86 Rugby Football League season
