= 1906–07 Challenge Cup =

Rugby league competition

- Duration: 6 rounds
- Highest attendance: 18,500
- Winners: Warrington
- Runners-up: Oldham

The 1906–07 Challenge Cup was the 11th staging of rugby league's oldest knockout competition, the Challenge Cup.

The final was contested by Warrington and Oldham at Wheater's Field in Broughton, Salford.

The final was played on Saturday 27 April 1907, where Warrington beat Oldham 17–3 at Wheater's Field in front of a crowd of 18,500.

Warrington's win was their second in three seasons.

== Qualifier ==
Date	Team one	Score one	Team two	Score two
02 Mar	Askam	5	Millom	14
02 Mar	Barrow	24	Pemberton Rovers	0
02 Mar	Brighouse St.James	15	Sharlston Rovers	0
02 Mar	Egerton	0	Radcliffe	14
02 Mar	Newington	3	York	3
02 Mar	Saville Green	10	Bramley	0
02 Mar	Workington	5	Maryport	4
06 Mar	Maryport	6	Workington	8
06 Mar	York	13	Newington	13
08 Mar	Newington	5	York	14

== First round ==
Date	Team one	Score one	Team two	Score two
16 Mar	Barrow	0	Dewsbury	0
16 Mar	Broughton Rangers	38	Widnes	0
16 Mar	Huddersfield	38	Brighouse St.James	0
16 Mar	Hull Kingston Rovers	9	Bradford	8
16 Mar	Keighley	18	Brookland	0
16 Mar	Leeds	18	Rochdale Hornets	11
16 Mar	Millom	3	Halifax	45
16 Mar	Oldham	5	Runcorn	0
16 Mar	Radcliffe	0	York	13
16 Mar	Salford	10	Leigh	5
16 Mar	Swinton	16	St Helens	9
16 Mar	Warrington	34	Batley	9
16 Mar	Whitehaven Recs	10	Saville Green	0
16 Mar	Liverpool City	2	Hull FC	63
16 Mar	Wigan	20	Hunslet	6
16 Mar	Workington	3	Wakefield Trinity	3
20 Mar	Dewsbury	16	Barrow	3
20 Mar	Wakefield Trinity	16	Workington	5

== Second round ==
Date	Team one	Score one	Team two	Score two
23 Mar	Broughton Rangers	7	Leeds	11
23 Mar	Halifax	5	Oldham	10
23 Mar	Huddersfield	17	Hull Kingston Rovers	0
23 Mar	Salford	18	Wigan	5
23 Mar	Wakefield Trinity	12	Dewsbury	12
23 Mar	Warrington	16	Hull FC	0
23 Mar	Whitehaven Recs	0	Keighley	14
23 Mar	York	3	Swinton	11
26 Mar	Dewsbury	5	Wakefield Trinity	21

== Quarterfinals ==
Date	Team one	Score one	Team two	Score two
30 Mar	Huddersfield	9	Warrington	15
30 Mar	Salford	12	Leeds	3
30 Mar	Swinton	22	Keighley	8
30 Mar	Wakefield Trinity	10	Oldham	14

== Semifinals ==
Date	Team one	Score one	Team two	Score two
13 Apr	Oldham	6	Salford	0
13 Apr	Warrington	21	Swinton	0

== Final ==
27 April 1907

Warrington	17 – 3	Oldham
	Report

Wheater's Field, Broughton
Attendance: 18,500
