= 1904–05 Challenge Cup =

Rugby league competition

- Duration: 6 rounds
- Highest attendance: 19,638
- Winners: Warrington
- Runners-up: Hull Kingston Rovers

The 1904–05 Challenge Cup was the 9th staging of rugby league's oldest knockout competition, the Challenge Cup.

Warrington, the previous year's beaten finalists, won the Cup at their third attempt.

== Qualifier ==
Date	Team One	Score	Team Two
18 Feb	Barrow St.George's	2–8	Morecambe
18 Feb	Barrow	11–0	Millom
18 Feb	Beverley	2–9	York
18 Feb	Bramley	0–3	Keighley
18 Feb	Brighouse Rangers	6–8	Normanton
18 Feb	Brookland	5–10	Maryport
18 Feb	Castleford	24–7	Lancaster
18 Feb	Huddersfield	20–3	Vic Rangers
18 Feb	Ossett	5–0	Sharlston Rovers
18 Feb	Pontefract	2–22	Dewsbury
18 Feb	Rochdale Hornets	2–0	Chadderton
18 Feb	Rochdale Rangers	10–9	Egerton
18 Feb	Seaton Rangers	3–5	Parton
25 Feb - replay	Brookland	2–0	Maryport

== First round ==
Date	Team One	Score	Team Two
04 Mar	Batley	13–5	Barrow
04 Mar	Bradford	42–5	Castleford
04 Mar	Brookland	5–73	Hull Kingston Rovers
04 Mar	Broughton Rangers	8–0	Runcorn
04 Mar	Halifax	2–0	Dewsbury
04 Mar	Huddersfield	5–0	York
04 Mar	Hull FC	52–0	Leigh Shamrocks
04 Mar	Hunslet	22–3	Parton
04 Mar	Keighley	8–0	Salford
04 Mar	Leeds	20–0	Ossett
04 Mar	Leigh	3–0	Wigan
04 Mar	Oldham	16–3	Normanton
04 Mar	St Helens	9–2	Rochdale Rangers
04 Mar	Swinton	8–3	Rochdale Hornets
04 Mar	Warrington	30–0	Morecambe
04 Mar	Widnes	3–5	Wakefield Trinity
22 Mar - replay	Wigan	5–0	Leigh

== Second round ==
Date	Team One	Score	Team Two
18 Mar	Batley	10–14	Oldham
18 Mar	Broughton Rangers	18–0	St Helens
18 Mar	Huddersfield	3–3	Wakefield Trinity
18 Mar	Hull FC	5–7	Hunslet
18 Mar	Hull Kingston Rovers	3–0	Leeds
18 Mar	Swinton	0–6	Bradford
18 Mar	Warrington	3–3	Keighley
21 Mar - replay	Keighley	0–7	Warrington
22 Mar - replay	Wakefield Trinity	7–0	Huddersfield
25 Mar	Wigan	5–2	Halifax

== Quarterfinals ==
Date	Team One	Score	Team Two
01 Apr	Broughton Rangers	16–10	Wakefield Trinity
01 Apr	Hull Kingston Rovers	8–2	Hunslet
01 Apr	Oldham	0–0	Bradford
01 Apr	Warrington	13–0	Wigan
05 Apr - replay	Bradford	8–5	Oldham

== Semifinals ==
Date	Team One	Score	Team Two
15 Apr	Hull Kingston Rovers	10–6	Broughton Rangers
15 Apr	Warrington	7–2	Bradford

== Final ==
The final was contested by Warrington and Hull Kingston Rovers at Headingley in Leeds on Saturday 29 April 1905, in front of a crowd of 19,638. Warrington beat Hull KR 6–0.

29 April 1905

Warrington	6 – 0	Hull Kingston Rovers
	Report

Headingley, Leeds
Attendance: 19,638
