= 1900–01 Northern Rugby Football Union season =

- Structure: Separate county championships

1900-01 Season
- Top point-scorer: Williams 141
- Top try-scorer: Williams 47

Lancashire Senior Competition
- Champions: Oldham

Yorkshire Senior Competition
- Champions: Bradford

The 1900–01 Northern Rugby Football Union season was the sixth season of rugby league football.

== Season summary ==
The Lancashire Senior Competition was won by Oldham and the Yorkshire Senior Competition by Bradford.

In 1901 Bramley's James Lomas became rugby league's first £100 transfer, moving to Salford.

== Lancashire Senior Competition ==
Barrow replaced Tyldesley. Although participating in the Lancashire Senior Competition, Runcorn and Stockport were from Cheshire, and Millom were from Cumberland.

| | Team | Pld | W | D | L | PF | PA | Pts |
|---|---|---|---|---|---|---|---|---|
| 1 | Oldham | 26 | 22 | 1 | 3 | 301 | 67 | 45 |
| 2 | Swinton | 26 | 21 | 2 | 3 | 283 | 66 | 44 |
| 3 | Runcorn | 26 | 20 | 0 | 6 | 240 | 100 | 40 |
| 4 | Broughton Rangers | 26 | 17 | 2 | 7 | 211 | 84 | 36 |
| 5 | Salford | 26 | 15 | 0 | 11 | 229 | 149 | 30 |
| 6 | Warrington | 26 | 12 | 3 | 11 | 149 | 126 | 27 |
| 7 | Leigh | 26 | 12 | 2 | 12 | 157 | 143 | 26 |
| 8 | Barrow | 26 | 10 | 2 | 14 | 140 | 169 | 22 |
| 9 | Wigan | 26 | 8 | 3 | 15 | 98 | 227 | 19 |
| 10 | Rochdale Hornets | 26 | 8 | 2 | 16 | 103 | 257 | 18 |
| 11 | Millom | 26 | 8 | 0 | 18 | 85 | 194 | 16 |
| 12 | Stockport | 26 | 6 | 3 | 17 | 102 | 184 | 15 |
| 13 | St. Helens | 26 | 6 | 2 | 18 | 82 | 228 | 12* |
| 14 | Widnes | 26 | 6 | 0 | 20 | 85 | 271 | 12 |

- St Helens had 2 points deducted for a breach of the professional rules.

== Yorkshire Senior Competition ==
| | Team | Pld | W | D | L | PF | PA | Pts |
|---|---|---|---|---|---|---|---|---|
| 1 | Bradford | 30 | 26 | 1 | 3 | 387 | 100 | 51* |
| 2 | Halifax | 30 | 22 | 3 | 5 | 309 | 147 | 47 |
| 3 | Hunslet | 30 | 20 | 0 | 10 | 252 | 142 | 40 |
| 4 | Batley | 30 | 17 | 5 | 8 | 166 | 131 | 39 |
| 5 | Hull | 30 | 19 | 1 | 10 | 291 | 141 | 37* |
| 6 | Huddersfield | 30 | 17 | 1 | 12 | 241 | 130 | 35 |
| 7 | Brighouse Rangers | 30 | 16 | 0 | 14 | 194 | 162 | 32 |
| 8 | Hull Kingston Rovers | 30 | 15 | 2 | 13 | 195 | 169 | 32 |
| 9 | Wakefield Trinity | 30 | 14 | 3 | 13 | 242 | 148 | 31 |
| 10 | Leeds Parish Church | 30 | 12 | 6 | 12 | 115 | 108 | 30 |
| 11 | Bramley | 30 | 12 | 5 | 13 | 138 | 163 | 29 |
| 12 | Manningham | 30 | 9 | 1 | 20 | 115 | 258 | 19 |
| 13 | Leeds | 30 | 7 | 3 | 20 | 144 | 255 | 17 |
| 14 | Holbeck | 30 | 7 | 3 | 20 | 110 | 263 | 15* |
| 15 | Castleford | 30 | 5 | 4 | 21 | 92 | 331 | 14 |
| 16 | Liversedge | 30 | 2 | 2 | 26 | 43 | 386 | 6 |

- Bradford, Hull and Holbeck each had 2 points deducted for a breach of the professional rules.

== Challenge Cup ==
The 1901 Challenge Cup was the 5th staging of rugby league's oldest knockout competition, the Challenge Cup. The final was played between Batley and Warrington at Headingley Stadium in Leeds.
