= List of Rugby Football League seasons =

A list of Rugby Football League seasons since its inception as the Northern Rugby Football Union in 1895:

== Seasons ==
Season	First Division/Super League Winners	Second Division/RFL Championship Winners	Third Division/RFL League 1 Winners	Challenge Cup Winners
1895–96	Manningham F.C.	—N/a	—N/a	—N/a
1896–97	County Leagues	—N/a	—N/a	Batley
1897–98	County Leagues	—N/a	—N/a	Batley
1898–99	County Leagues	—N/a	—N/a	Oldham
1899–1900	County Leagues	—N/a	—N/a	Swinton
1900–01	County Leagues	—N/a	—N/a	Batley
1901–02	Broughton Rangers	—N/a	—N/a	Broughton Rangers
1902–03	Halifax	Keighley	—N/a	Halifax
1903–04	Bradford F.C.	St. Helens	—N/a	Halifax
1904–05	Oldham	Dewsbury	—N/a	Warrington
1905–06	Leigh	—N/a	—N/a	Bradford F.C.
1906–07	Halifax	—N/a	—N/a	Warrington
1907–08	Hunslet	—N/a	—N/a	Hunslet
1908–09	Wigan	—N/a	—N/a	Wakefield Trinity
1909–10	Oldham	—N/a	—N/a	Leeds
1910–11	Oldham	—N/a	—N/a	Broughton Rangers
1911–12	Huddersfield	—N/a	—N/a	Dewsbury
1912–13	Huddersfield	—N/a	—N/a	Huddersfield
1913–14	Salford	—N/a	—N/a	Hull F.C.
1914–15	Huddersfield	—N/a	—N/a	Huddersfield
1915–16	Dewsbury	—N/a	—N/a	—N/a
1916–17	Dewsbury	—N/a	—N/a	—N/a
1917–18	Barrow	—N/a	—N/a	—N/a
1918–19	County Leagues	—N/a	—N/a	—N/a
1919–20	Hull F.C.	—N/a	—N/a	Huddersfield
1920–21	Hull F.C.	—N/a	—N/a	Leigh
1921–22	Wigan	—N/a	—N/a	Rochdale Hornets
1922–23	Hull Kingston Rovers	—N/a	—N/a	Leeds
1923–24	Batley	—N/a	—N/a	Wigan
1924–25	Hull Kingston Rovers	—N/a	—N/a	Oldham
1925–26	Wigan	—N/a	—N/a	Swinton
1926–27	Swinton	—N/a	—N/a	Oldham
1927–28	Swinton	—N/a	—N/a	Swinton
1928–29	Huddersfield	—N/a	—N/a	Wigan
1929–30	Huddersfield	—N/a	—N/a	Widnes
1930–31	Swinton	—N/a	—N/a	Halifax
1931–32	St. Helens	—N/a	—N/a	Leeds
1932–33	Salford	—N/a	—N/a	Huddersfield
1933–34	Wigan	—N/a	—N/a	Hunslet
1934–35	Swinton	—N/a	—N/a	Castleford
1935–36	Hull F.C.	—N/a	—N/a	Leeds
1936–37	Salford	—N/a	—N/a	Widnes
1937–38	Hunslet	—N/a	—N/a	Salford
1938–39	Salford	—N/a	—N/a	Halifax
1939–40	County Leagues	—N/a	—N/a	—N/a
1940–41	County Leagues	—N/a	—N/a	—N/a
1941–42	Dewsbury	—N/a	—N/a	Leeds
1942–43	Wigan	—N/a	—N/a	Dewsbury
1943–44	Wakefield Trinity	—N/a	—N/a	Bradford Northern
1944–45	Bradford Northern	—N/a	—N/a	Huddersfield
1945–46	Wigan	—N/a	—N/a	Wakefield Trinity
1946–47	Wigan	—N/a	—N/a	Bradford Northern
1947–48	Warrington	—N/a	—N/a	Wigan
1948–49	Huddersfield	—N/a	—N/a	Bradford Northern
1949–50	Wigan	—N/a	—N/a	Warrington
1950–51	Workington	—N/a	—N/a	Wigan
1951–52	Wigan	—N/a	—N/a	Workington
1952–53	St. Helens	—N/a	—N/a	Huddersfield Giants
1953–54	Warrington	—N/a	—N/a	Warrington
1954–55	Warrington	—N/a	—N/a	Barrow Raiders
1955–56	Hull F.C.	—N/a	—N/a	St. Helens
1956–57	Oldham	—N/a	—N/a	Leeds
1957–58	Hull F.C.	—N/a	—N/a	Wigan
1958–59	St. Helens	—N/a	—N/a	Wigan
1959–60	Wigan	—N/a	—N/a	Wakefield Trinity
1960–61	Leeds	—N/a	—N/a	St. Helens
1961–62	Huddersfield	—N/a	—N/a	Wakefield Trinity
1962–63	Swinton	Hunslet	—N/a	Wakefield Trinity
1963–64	Swinton	Oldham	—N/a	Widnes
1964–65	Halifax	—N/a	—N/a	Wigan
1965–66	St. Helens	—N/a	—N/a	St. Helens
1966–67	Wakefield Trinity	—N/a	—N/a	Featherstone Rovers
1967–68	Wakefield Trinity	—N/a	—N/a	Leeds
1968–69	Leeds	—N/a	—N/a	Castleford
1969–70	St. Helens	—N/a	—N/a	Castleford
1970–71	St. Helens	—N/a	—N/a	Leigh
1971–72	Leeds	—N/a	—N/a	St. Helens
1972–73	Dewsbury	—N/a	—N/a	Featherstone Rovers
1973–74	Salford	Bradford Northern	—N/a	Warrington
1974–75	St. Helens	Huddersfield	—N/a	Widnes
1975–76	Salford	Barrow	—N/a	St. Helens
1976–77	Featherstone Rovers	Hull F.C.	—N/a	Leeds
1977–78	Widnes	Leigh	—N/a	Leeds
1978–79	Hull Kingston Rovers	Hull F.C.	—N/a	Widnes
1979–80	Bradford Northern	Featherstone Rovers	—N/a	Hull Kingston Rovers
1980–81	Bradford Northern	York	—N/a	Widnes
1981–82	Leigh	Oldham	—N/a	Hull F.C.
1982–83	Hull F.C.	Fulham	—N/a	Featherstone Rovers
1983–84	Hull Kingston Rovers	Barrow	—N/a	Widnes
1984–85	Hull Kingston Rovers	Swinton	—N/a	Wigan
1985–86	Halifax	Leigh	—N/a	Castleford
1986–87	Wigan	Hunslet	—N/a	Halifax
1987–88	Widnes	Oldham	—N/a	Wigan
1988–89	Widnes	Leigh	—N/a	Wigan
1989–90	Wigan	Hull Kingston Rovers	—N/a	Wigan
1990–91	Wigan	Salford	—N/a	Wigan
1991–92	Wigan	Sheffield	Huddersfield	Wigan
1992–93	Wigan	Featherstone Rovers	Keighley	Wigan
1993–94	Wigan	Workington	—N/a	Wigan
1994–95	Wigan	Keighley	—N/a	Wigan
1995–96	Wigan	Salford	Hull Kingston Rovers	Wigan
1996	St. Helens	Salford City Reds	Hull Kingston Rovers	St. Helens
1997	Bradford Bulls	Hull F.C.	Hunslet Hawks	St. Helens
1998	Wigan Warriors	Wakefield Trinity Wildcats	—N/a	Sheffield Eagles
1999	St. Helens	Hunslet Hawks	—N/a	Leeds Rhinos
2000	St. Helens	Dewsbury Rams	—N/a	Bradford Bulls
2001	Bradford Bulls	Widnes Vikings	—N/a	St. Helens
2002	St. Helens	Huddersfield Giants	—N/a	Wigan Warriors
2003	Bradford Bulls	Salford City Reds	Keighley Cougars	Bradford Bulls
2004	Leeds Rhinos	Leigh Centurions	Barrow Raiders	St. Helens
2005	Bradford Bulls	Whitehaven	York City Knights	Hull F.C.
2006	St. Helens	Hull Kingston Rovers	Dewsbury Rams	St. Helens
2007	Leeds Rhinos	Castleford Tigers	Crusaders	St. Helens
2008	Leeds Rhinos	Salford City Reds	Newcastle Thunder	St. Helens
2009	Leeds Rhinos	Barrow Raiders	Dewsbury Rams	Warrington Wolves
2010	Wigan Warriors	Halifax	York City Knights	Warrington Wolves
2011	Leeds Rhinos	Featherstone Rovers	Swinton Lions	Wigan Warriors
2012	Leeds Rhinos	Sheffield Eagles	Doncaster	Warrington Wolves
2013	Wigan Warriors	Sheffield Eagles	North Wales Crusaders	Wigan Warriors
2014	St. Helens	Leigh Centurions	Hunslet Hawks	Leeds Rhinos
2015	Leeds Rhinos	Leigh Centurions	Oldham R.L.F.C.	Leeds Rhinos
2016	Wigan Warriors	Leigh Centurions	Toulouse Olympique	Hull F.C.
2017	Leeds Rhinos	Hull Kingston Rovers	Toronto Wolfpack	Hull F.C.
2018	Wigan Warriors	Toronto Wolfpack	York City Knights	Catalans Dragons
2019	St. Helens	Toronto Wolfpack	Whitehaven	Warrington Wolves
2020	St. Helens	Cancelled	Cancelled	Leeds Rhinos
2021	St. Helens	Toulouse Olympique	Barrow Raiders	St. Helens
2022	St. Helens	Leigh Leopards	Keighley Cougars	Wigan Warriors
2023	Wigan Warriors	London Broncos	Dewsbury Rams	Leigh Leopards
2024	Wigan Warriors	Wakefield Trinity	Oldham R.L.F.C.	Wigan Warriors
2025	Hull Kingston Rovers	Toulouse Olympique	North Wales Crusaders	Hull Kingston Rovers
