= Brighouse Rangers (1915) =

Defunct English semi-professional rugby league club

Brighouse Rangers RFC
Club information
- Full name: Brighouse Rangers Rugby Football Club
- Founded: 1915; 111 years ago
- Exited: circa 1919; 107 years ago

Brighouse Rangers was a (semi) professional rugby league club. This club was based in Brighouse, a town within the Metropolitan Borough of Calderdale, in West Yorkshire, England.

The club played in the Wartime Emergency Leagues from 1915–16 to 1918–19 (January) but not the "Victory" League.

== History ==
=== Early history ===
The previous Brighouse Rangers Football Club were founded in the 1870s, and joined the RFU in 1879, to become one of the founder members of the new Northern Union in 1895, played in the first season 1895–96, became the first winner of the Yorkshire Senior Competition in 1896–97, and continued for 11 seasons until 1905–06, and disbanded in summer 1906.

This club, Brighouse Rangers was in existence in 1915, but otherwise there is very little publicised information available.

=== Wartime Emergency League ===
Brighouse Rangers joined the War League for season 1915–16 and spent three and a half years with very little success.

In the first season 1915–16 the club finished bottom out of the 24 clubs with 3 points.

In the second season 1916–17 Brighouse Rangers managed to finish second bottom out of 26 clubs with 2 points. The bottom club York also had 2 points, but had played one game more and therefore had a poorer percentage rating.

In the third season 1917–18 the club managed a slight improvement finishing 18th out of 22.

The next season, 1918–19 (Jan), commenced as another Wartime Emergency League but with the end of the war, the programme was terminated in January 1919, and a quickly arranged and shortened “Victory" League programme was instigated.

This programme was never completed - and no league tables were ever produced.

It is assumed that the club continued to have very limited success and folded before the start of the 1919 (Feb-May) “Victory” League as they do not appear in the league tables for this season.

Note - Nowhere in the official archives is the word "Victory" used. It has been used in this article to distinguish between the two competitions held in the 1918–19 season.

=== Successor clubs ===
Brighouse Rugby League club have reformed numerous times since then.

The current club are amateurs Brighouse Rangers ARLFC. In the 1970 Brighouse played at Wellholme Park, near the Cricket Club. Towards the approach of the new millennium in 2000, Tesco bought the site including Brighouse ARLFC clubhouse and with the money, the club built anew on Russell Way, off Bradford Road.

== Records ==
=== Club league performance ===
In a Season
	Details	Season	Competition	Comments	Notes	Ref
Highest League Position	18	1917–18	WEL	out of 22 clubs		
Lowest League Position	25	1916–17	WEL	out of 26 clubs		
and	24	1915–16	WEL	out of 24 clubs		
Most League Points	10	1917–18	WEL	out of possible 40 = 25%		
Fewest League Points	2	1916–17	WEL	out of possible 34 = 6%		
Most Points Scored (PF)	75	1917–18	WEL	In 20 games = 3.75/game		
Most Points Conceded (PA)	344	1915–16	WEL	In 22 games = 3.23/game		
or	311	1916–17	WEL	In 17 games = 3.47/game		
Fewest Points Scored (PF)	59	1916–17	WEL	In 17 games = 3.47/game		
or (PF)	71	1915–16	WEL	In 22 games = 3.23/game		
Fewest Points Conceded (PA)	302	1917–18	WEL	In 20 games = 3.75/game		
Best Points Difference	-227	1917–18	WEL	In 20 games		
Worst Points Difference	-273	1915–16	WEL	In 22 games		

== Club league record ==
Season	Competition	Pos	Team Name	Pl	W	D	L	PF	PA	Diff	Pts	%	No of teams in league	Notes	Ref
1915–16	WEL	24	Brighouse Rangers	22	1	1	20	71	344	-273	3	6.82	24		
1916–17	WEL	25	Brighouse Rangers	17	1	0	16	59	311	-252	2	5.89	26		
1917–18	WEL	18	Brighouse Rangers	20	4	2	14	75	302	-227	10	25	22		
1918–1919 (Jan)	WEL	position is unknown as League programme not completed and tables not calculated|													

Heading Abbreviations
Pl = Games played; W = Win; D = Draw; L = Lose; PF = Points for; PA = Points against; Diff = Points difference (+ or -); Pts = League Points
League points: for win = 2; for draw = 1; for loss = 0.

== Several fixtures and results ==
The following a one of Brighouse Rangers’ fixtures for the four seasons in which they participated in the Wartime Emergency League :-

Season	Date	Competition	Opponent	Venue	H/A	Result	Score	Att	Notes	Ref
1917–18	Sat 22 December 1917	WEL	Hull	Boulevard	H	Lost	3-24			

Heading Abbreviations
CC Rx = Challenge Cup Round x; WEL = Wartime Emergency League:

== Notes and comments ==
1 - The name "Victory" League is not used on official documents. It also has only been used here to distinguish between the two programmes which ran during the 1918–19 season.

== See also ==
- British rugby league system
- History of rugby league
- The Great Schism – Rugby League View
- The Great Schism – Rugby Union View
- List of defunct rugby league clubs
