= Brighouse Rangers RFC =

Defunct English semi-professional rugby league club

Brighouse Rangers RLFC

Club information
- Full name: Brighouse Rangers Rugby Football Club
- Exited: 1906; 120 years ago

Former details
- Ground: Waterloo Road Lane Head, Brighouse
- Competition: Yorkshire Men’s League -premier division

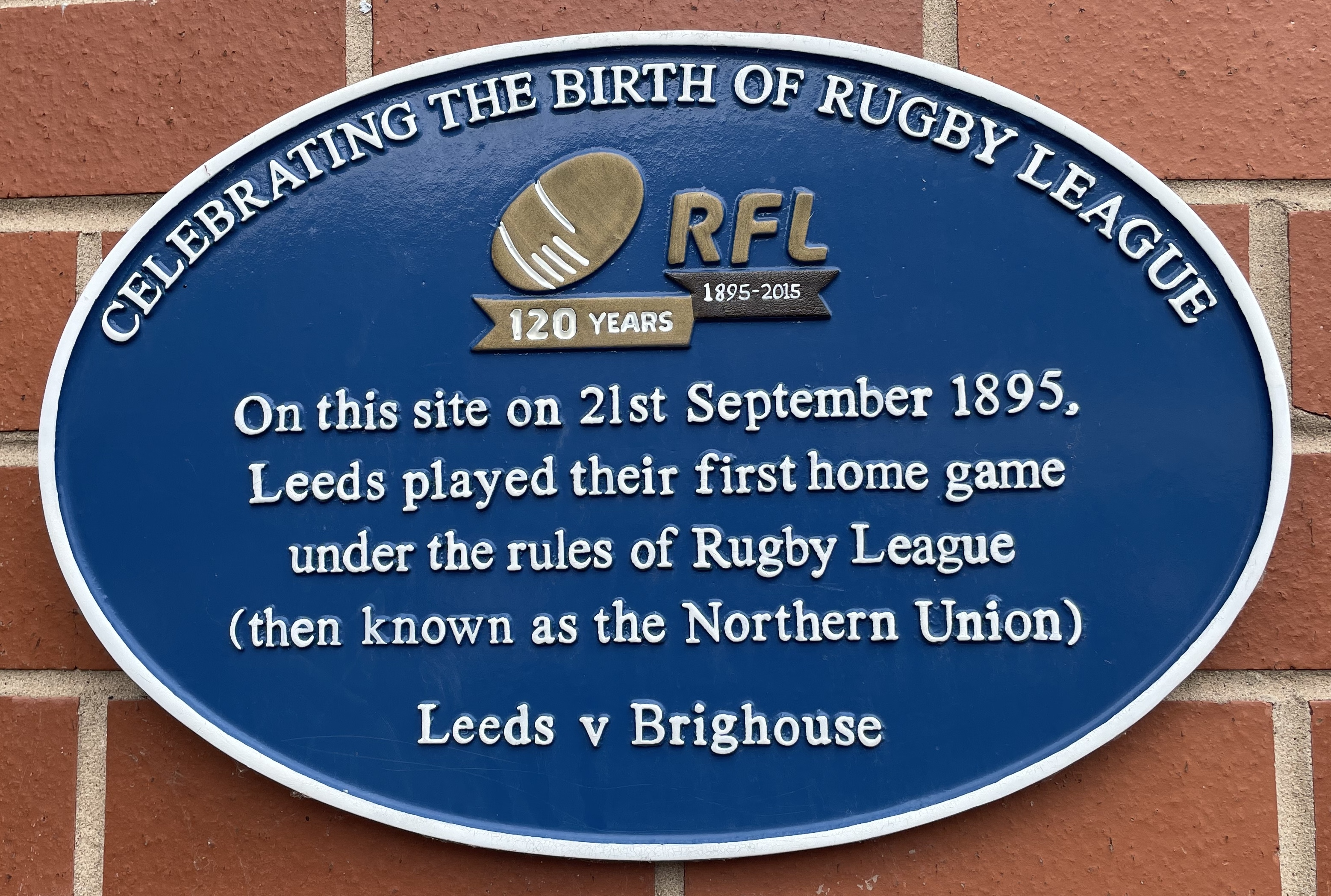
Plaque celebrating the birth of Rugby League

Brighouse Rangers was a rugby league club in Brighouse, West Yorkshire, England.

The club was involved in the meeting at the George Hotel, Huddersfield in 1895, and after the schism became founder members of the Northern Rugby Football Union (now Rugby Football League), playing for eleven seasons from 1895–96 to 1905–06.

After a break, a new club, also called Brighouse Rangers, appeared in 1915 and played in the Emergency War Leagues in 1915–16, 1916–17, 1917–18 and 1918–19.

== History ==
=== Early history ===
Brighouse Rangers Football Club were founded in the 1870s, and joined the RFU in 1879.

After the 1890-91 season, Brighouse along with other Yorkshire Senior clubs Batley, Bradford, Dewsbury, Halifax, Huddersfield, Hull, Hunslet, Leeds, Liversedge, Manningham and Wakefield decided that they wanted their own county league starting in 1891 along the lines of a similar competition that had been played in Lancashire. The clubs wanted full control of the league but the Yorkshire Rugby Football Union would not sanction the competition as it meant giving up control of rugby football to the senior clubs.

In 1895, on 20 April, Brighouse Rangers won "T'owd Tin Pot", beating Morley R.F.C. 16–4 in the Yorkshire Cup Final at Headingley, Leeds before a crowd of in the region of 20,000.

=== Northern Union ===
Brighouse Rangers, like many other clubs from Lancashire (and Yorkshire), had suffered punishment by the RFU for "broken time" payments. After their annual general meeting in London, the RFU issued a decree banning the playing of rugby at grounds where entrance fees were charged, and so Brighouse Rangers, represented by H H Waller, attended a meeting at The George Hotel, Huddersfield, together with the representatives of 21 other clubs, and agreed to form a Northern Rugby Football Union.

After the Great Schism in 1895, Brighouse Rangers were one of the founder members of the new league and the same H H Waller of Brighouse Rangers was elected the first Northern Rugby Football Union chairman.

In the first season 1895–96 the league consisted of 22 clubs and Brighouse Rangers, continuing their recent Rugby Union form, finished in 5th position.

In season 1896–97 the league was divided into Yorkshire and Lancashire. Brighouse Rangers, playing in the former section, finished in 1st position out of 16 teams, 2 points ahead of second placed Manningham and a full eight points above third place Halifax. Brighouse Rangers were crowned Yorkshire Champions.

In the following four seasons, still in the Yorkshire section, seasons 1897–98, 1898–99, 1899–1900 & 1900–01 the club finished in 13th, 10th and 12th before moving up to a mid-table 7th in the respective seasons, each time out of the 16 clubs.

For the next season, 1901–02 the top seven clubs in each of the County Senior Leagues decided to break from the rest of the clubs and form "The Northern Rugby League". This is the first time these terms had been used. Brighouse Rangers, after finishing 7th (and beating Hull Kingston Rovers team with the same points by a better points scoring difference of 6), were included to this first division.

Brighouse Rangers finishing 14th and bottom with a playing record of 5 points (4 wins and 1 draw) out of 26 matches played.

The Rugby League made yet another change to the league structure for the next 1902–03 by renaming the top league as the 1st Division and increasing the number of clubs to 18, thus preventing any threatened relegations. Brighouse remained in the first division. In this following season, Brighouse Rangers again finished bottom out of the 18 teams, but this time only 2 points adrift of second bottom St. Helens and 8 points away from third bottom Wigan. This time both Brighouse Rangers and St. Helens were relegated.

For the next two seasons 1903–04 and 1904–05, Brighouse Rangers in the 2nd Division where they finished 6th out of 17 and then 11th out of 14 respectively.

The following season 1905–06 the two leagues were combined into one. Also, clubs arranged all their own fixtures with the condition that any team they played they did so twice, both home and away. This meant that the league positions were decided on a % basis (i.e. the actual points gained divided by the number of points possible if the club had won every game – the answer multiplied by a hundred). In this, Brighouse Rangers' last season, they finished bottom equal with Morecambe, bottom with 8 points out of a possible 52 and bottom with a 15.38% winning percentage.

At their annual general meeting in summer 1906 Brighouse Rangers took the decision to disband.

=== Successor clubs ===
After a break, another club with the same name Brighouse Rangers appeared during the First World War and played in the Emergency War League in season 1915–16, 1916–17, 1917–18 and the 1918–19 (Jan) wartime league but not in the shortened 1919 (Feb – May) Victory League.

Brighouse Rugby League club have reformed numerous times since. The current club are amateurs Brighouse Rangers ARLFC.

In the 1970s Brighouse Rangers (ARLFC) were reformed by former Luddenden and Ovenden player Jeff Greenwood and former Bradford Northern player John Chase they played at Wellholme Park, near the Brighouse Cricket Club. Towards the end of the new millennium 2000, Tesco bought the site including the Brighouse ARLFC clubhouse and with the money, the club built a new ground on Russell Way, off Bradford Road. As at 2022 they play in the Premier Div, Yorkshire League also run a ladies team and a number of age group teams .

== Honours ==
- Yorkshire League: 1
  - 1896–97

== Club name ==
According to the official Rugby League records the Club was called Brighouse Rangers Some sites and books refer to the club as Brighouse Rovers though.

== Player earning international caps while at Brighouse Rangers ==
- William "Billy" Nicholl (b 30/10/1868 in Rastrick — d 10/04/1922 in Brighouse)) played for England, in 1892 against Wales, and Scotland and for Brighouse Rangers, at both Rugby Union and Rugby League.

== Ground ==
The club's first ground was at Fink Hill. In 1883 they moved to Waterloo Road, Lane Head (now the site of St Andrews Junior School and adjacent allotments), where they stayed until their demise in 1906.

== Colours ==
The club's colours were red, black, and amber.

== Records ==
=== Club league performance ===
In a Season
	Details	Season	Competition	Comments	Notes	Ref
Highest League Position	5	1895–96	RL	out of clubs		
or	1	1896–97	Yorks Sen	out of clubs		
Lowest League Position	31	1905–06	RL	out of clubs		
and	14	1901–02	RL	out of clubs		
and	18	1902–03	1st Div	out of clubs		
Most League Points	56	1895–96	RL	out of possible 84 = 67%		
or	48	1896–97	Yorks Sen	out of possible 60 = 80%		
Least League Points	7	1901–02	RL	out of possible 52 = 14%		
Most Points Scored (PF)	247	1895–96	RL	In 42 games = 5.88/game		
or	213	1896–97	Yorks Sen	In 30 games = 2.18/game		
Most Points Conceded (PA)	333	1905–06	RL	In 26 games = 3.35/game		
Least Points Scored (PF)	74	1901–02	RL	In 26 games = 2.85/game		
or (PF)	79	1902–03	1st Div	In 34 games = 2.32/game		
Least Points Conceded (PA)	68	1896–97	Yorks Sen	In 30 games = 7.1/game		
Best Points Difference	145	1896–97	Yorks Sen	In 30 games		
Worst Points Difference	−250	1901–02	RL	In 26 games		

=== Club trophies ===
- Yorkshire Cup (Rugby Union) winners: 1895
- Brighouse Rangers were the first Champions of the 1896–97 Yorkshire Senior Competition.

=== Club league record ===
Season	Competition	Pos	Team Name	Pl	W	D	L	PW	PA	Diff	Pts	%	No of teams in league	Notes	Ref
1895–96	RL	5	Brighouse Rangers	42	27	2	13	247	129	118	56				
1896–97	Yorks Sen	1	Brighouse Rangers	30	22	4	4	213	68	145	48				
1897–98	Yorks Sen	13	Brighouse Rangers	30	9	5	16	143	172	−9	23				
1898–99	Yorks Sen	10	Brighouse Rangers	30	12	2	16	114	191	−77	26				
1899–1900	Yorks Sen	12	Brighouse Rangers	30	9	3	18	80	231	−151	21				
1900–01	Yorks Sen	7	Brighouse Rangers	30	16	0	14	194	162	32	32				
1901–02	RL	14	Brighouse Rangers	26	3	1	22	74	324	−250	7				
1902–03	1st Div	18	Brighouse Rangers	34	7	4	23	79	270	−191	18				
1903–04	2nd Div	6	Brighouse Rangers	32	19	3	10	192	136	56	41				
1904–05	2nd Div	11	Brighouse Rangers	26	8	1	17	111	169	−58	17				
1905–06	RL	31	Brighouse Rangers	26	3	2	21	87	333	−246	8	15.38			

Heading Abbreviations
Pl = Games played; W = Win; D = Draw; L = Lose; PF = Points for; PA = Points against; Diff = Points difference (+ or -); Pts = League points
League points: for win = 2; for draw = 1; for loss = 0.

== Several fixtures and results ==
The following a selection of Brighouse Rangers' fixtures in the seasons in which they played (semi) professional Rugby League:-

Season	Date	Competition	Opponent	Venue	H/A	Result	Score	Att	Notes	Ref
1895–96	Mon 14 October 1895	RL	Wigan	Lane Head	H	Draw	3–3			
1895–96	Sat 2 November 1895	RL	Hull	Boulevard	A	Lost	0–5			
1895–96	23 November 1895	RL	Widnes	Lowerhouse Lane	A	Won	3–0			
1895–96	14 December 1895	RL	Warrington	unknown	?	Won	13–3			
1895–96	Sat 28 December 1895	RL	Wigan	Folly Fields	A	Draw	0–0			
1895–96	Sat 4 January 1896	RL	St. Helens	Lane Head	H	Won	6–4			
1895–96	14 March 1896	RL	Widnes	Lane Head	H	Won	11–0			
1895–96	28 March 1896	RL	Warrington	unknown	?	Won	13–7			
1895–96	Mon 6 April 1896	RL	St. Helens	Knowsley Rd	A	Draw	0–0			
1895–96	Mon 20 April 1896	RL	Hull	Lane Head	H	Won	6–3			
1896–97	Sat 31 October 1896	YSC	Hull	Boulevard	A	Draw	3–3			
1896–97	Wed 10 March 1897	YSC	Hull	Lane Head	H	Won	6–0			
1896–97	Sat 20 March 1897	CC R1	?	?						
1896–97	Sat 27 March 1897	CC R2	Wakefield Trinity	Lane Head			13–4			
1896–97	Sat 3 April 1897	CC R3	?	?			lost to			
1897–98	Sat 13 November 1897	YSC	Hull	Boulevard	A	Draw	0–0			
1897–98	Sat 19 February 1898	YSC	Hull	Lane Head	H	Won	7–3			
1898–99	Sat 24 September 1898	YSC	Hull	Boulevard	A	Lost	0–14			
1898–99	Sat 31 December 1898	YSC	Hull	Lane Head	H	Lost	0–21			
1899–1900	Sat 23 September 1899	YSC	Hull	Lane Head	H	Lost	5–10			
1899–1900	Sat 30 December 1899	YSC	Hull	Boulevard	A	Won	5–3			
1900–01	Sat 1 September 1900	YSC	Hull	Boulevard	A	Lost	0–13			
1900–01	Sat 15 December 1900	YSC	Hull	Lane Head	H	Won	7–4			
1901–02	Sat 21 September 1901	RL	Hull	Boulevard	A	Lost	0–3			
1901–02	2 November 1901	RL	Warrington	Wilderspool	A	Lost	2–7			
1901–02	15 February 1902	RL	Warrington	Lane Head	H	Lost	0–2			
1901–02	Sat 1 March 1902	RL	Hull	Lane Head	H	Won	4–3			
1902–03	13 September 1902	1st Div	Warrington	Wilderspool	A	Lost	0–3			
1902–03	Sat 27 September 1902	1st Div	St. Helens	Lane Head	H	Lost	3–4			
1902–03	Sat 8 November 1902	1st Div	Hull	Lane Head	H	Won	5–3			
1902–03	Sat 13 December 1902	1st Div	Wigan	Folly Fields	A	Lost	0–12			
1902–03	20 December 1902	1st Div	Widnes	Lane Head	H	Lost	2–5			
1902–03	10 January 1903	1st Div	Warrington	Lane Head	H	Won	7–0			
1902–03	Sat 24 January 1903	1st Div	St. Helens	Knowsley Rd	A	Won	7–0			
1902–03	Sat 11 April 1903	1st Div	Wigan	Lane Head	H	Won	3–0			
1902–03	Mon 13 April 1903	1st Div	Hull	Boulevard	A	Lost	2–23			
1902–03	18 April 1903	1st Div	Widnes	Lowerhouse Lane	A	Draw	5–5			
1903–04	Sat 31 October 1903	2nd Div	St. Helens	Knowsley Rd	A	Lost	0–10			
1903–04	Sat 27 February 1904	2nd Div	St. Helens	Lane Head	H	Won	3–0			
1905–06	Sat 16 December 1905	RL	Hull		H	Lost	7–13			
1905–06	23 December 1905	RL	Widnes	Lane Head	H	Draw	0–0			
1905–06	Sat 24 March 1906	RL	Hull	Boulevard	A	Lost	2–30			
1905–06	7 April 1906	RL	Widnes	Lowerhouse Lane	A	Lost	0–22			

Heading Abbreviations
CC Rx = Challenge Cup Round x; TSC = Yorkshire Senior Competition;

== See also ==
- T'owd Tin Pot
- British rugby league system
- The Great Schism – Rugby League View
- The Great Schism – Rugby Union View
- Rugby league county leagues
- List of defunct rugby league clubs
- Brighouse Rangers
