= 1896–97 Challenge Cup =

Rugby league competition

1897 Challenge Cup
- Duration: 6 Rounds
- Number of teams: 52
- Winners: Batley
- Runners-up: St Helens

The 1897 Challenge Cup was the inaugural staging of the Northern Rugby Football Union's Challenge Cup and involved 52 clubs from across England from the 1896–97 Northern Rugby Football Union season. The tournament was played over six rounds in March and April 1897, culminating in the final which was won by Batley.

== Background ==
The Northern Union decided to hold a cup competition called the Northern Rugby Football Union Challenge Cup in July 1896. The cup was commissioned from Bradford silversmiths and jewellers, Fattorini and Sons. Fattorini's designed the trophy themselves and it cost the Northern Union £60.

== Draw ==
The draw for the competition was made on 3 September 1896 although the matches were not due to be played until March and April 1897 over six consecutive weekends commencing 20 March 1897. All rounds were drawn at the same time with matches in the second and subsequent rounds given an identification letter such that ties for later rounds were expressed as, for example, "Q. Winner of Round C. v. winner of Round N."

The team drawn first had the option to play at home or could agree to play at the opponent's ground. The semi-finals and final were to be played at neutral venues.

== First round ==
The first round involved 20 matches and 40 clubs. 12 clubs (Batley, Bradford Church Hill, Brighouse Rangers, Crompton, Heckmondwike, Liversedge, St Helens Recs, Stockport, Swinton Church, Thornton Rangers, Tyldesley and Werneth) were given a bye to the next round.

All 20 ties were played on 20 March 1897.

Home	Score	Away
Bradford	7–3	Oldham
Bramley	8–8	Morecambe (Note: Morecambe gave up home advantage)
Broughton Rangers	0–0	Warrington
Castleford	43–3	Allerton
Eastmoor	26–8	Oldham Juniors
Halifax	55–5	Stockport Rangers (Note: Stockport Rangers gave up home advantage)
Holbeck	38–3	Latchford Rangers
Hull	9–0	Walkden
Hunslet	75–5	Broughton Recreation
Leeds	11–0	Rochdale St Clements
Leeds Parish Church	42–0	Runcorn Recreation (Note: Runcorn Recreation gave up home advantage)
Leigh	0–0	Wakefield Trinity
Manningham	31–3	Dukinfield
Rochdale Hornets	11–0	Waterhead Hornets
Runcorn	65–0	Warrington Loco
St Helens	66–0	Lees
Warrington St Mary's	0–28	Salford
Swinton	12–4	Huddersfield
Widnes	55–0	Atherton Hornets
Wigan	3–0	Radcliffe

=== First round replays ===
The three games requiring replays were all played on Wednesday 24 March

Home	Score	Away
Bramley	6–4	Morecambe
Warrington	3–0	Broughton Rangers
Wakefield Trinity	13–4	Leigh

== Second round ==
The second round of 16 ties was played on Saturday 27 March 1897.

Game no	Home	Score	Away
A	Liversedge	9–4	Heckmondwike
B	St Helens	17–3	Castleford
C	Bramley	0–11	Batley
D	Wigan	7–0	Manningham
E	Widnes	11–0	Hull
F	Tyldesley	9–3	Leeds
G	Rochdale Hornets	8–0	St Helens Recs
H	Thornton Rangers	4–52	Runcorn
I	Swinton	15–0	Hunslet
J	Warrington	24–0	Holbeck
K	Leeds Parish Church	0–11	Halifax
L	Bradford	68–3	Swinton Church
M	Eastmoor	3–3	Stockport
N	Brighouse Rangers	13–4	Wakefield Trinity
O	Salford	30–0	Werneth
P	Crompton	26–0	Bradford Church Hill

=== Second round replay ===
Stockport and Eastmoor replayed the tie on Wednesday 31 March.

Game no	Home	Score	Away
M	Stockport	28–8	Eastmoor

== Third round ==
The third round of eight games was played on Saturday 3 April.

Game no	Drawn as	Home	Score	Away
Q	C v N	Batley	6–3	Brighouse Rangers
R	G v I	Rochdale Hornets	3–3	Swinton
S	J v A	Warrington	6–0	Liversedge
T	M v O	Stockport	8–0	Salford
U	L v F	Bradford	4–8	Tyldesley
V	P v K	Halifax	50–0	Crompton
W	E v H	Widnes	14–6	Runcorn
X	B v D	St Helens	11–0	Wigan

=== Third round replay ===
Swinton and Rochdale replayed the drawn game on Wednesday 7 April.

Game no	Drawn as	Home	Score	Away
R	G v I	Swinton	10–0	Rochdale Hornets

== Fourth round ==
The quarter finals were played on Saturday 10 April 1897.

Game no	Drawn as	Home	Score	Away
AA	S v V	Warrington	10–8	Halifax
BB	Q v W	Batley	10–0	Widnes
CC	R v T	Swinton	3–0	Stockport
DD	X v U	St Helens	12–0	Tyldesley

== Semi-finals ==
The semi-finals were scheduled for Saturday 17 April. However, due to a waterlogged pitch, the tie between St. Helens and Swinton, due to be played at Broughton Rangers ground - Wheater's Field - was postponed until Monday 19 April. The game between Batley and Warrington, played at Fartown, Huddersfield did go ahead on a very soft pitch.

17 April 1897
3:00 pm

Batley	6–0	Warrington
Tries: Spurr (1), Davies (1)	Report

Fartown, Huddersfield
Attendance: 5,500
Referee: J H Smith (Widnes)

After the game Warrington lodged a protest over the result, claiming that the game should have been postponed due to the state of the pitch and that the game having gone ahead, the referee allowed the game to end six minutes short. Both grounds of protest were dismissed by the Northern Union Committee.

The rearranged game between St Helens and Swinton was played on Easter Monday, 19 April, watched by a crowd of 20,000 taking advantage of the bank holiday to attend.

19 April 1897
3:00 pm

St Helens	7–0	Swinton
Tries: Little (1); Drop goals: Jacques (1)	Report

Wheater's Field, Broughton
Attendance: 20,000
Referee: E Holmes

== Final ==
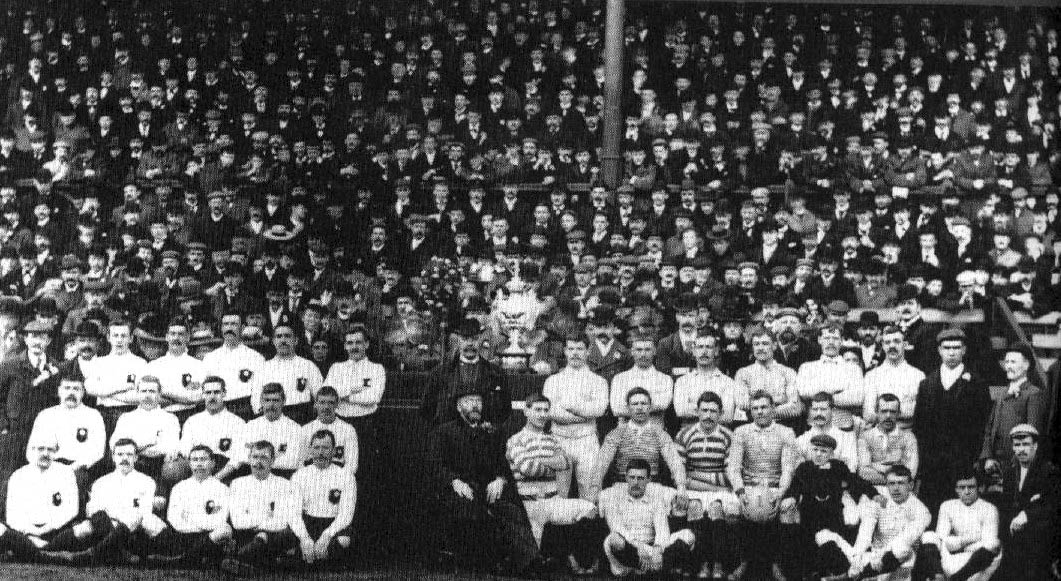
The teams and the Challenge Cup photographed before the kick-off: Batley Bulldogs vs. St Helens

The final took place on 24 April 1897 at Headingley, Leeds. The official attendance was 13,492, with gate receipts of £624.17s.7d. Batley wore white shirts and black shorts and socks in place of their normal cerise and fawn colours. St Helens wore blue and white hooped shirts, white shorts and black socks.

St Helens won the toss and elected to have Batley kick off. Despite playing into the wind in the first half, Batley took the lead after five minutes when stand-off Joe Oakland, kicked a drop goal to give Batley a 4–0 advantage. Batley extended their lead to 7–0 when centre John Goodall scored the first try of the game. These were the only scores of the first half. Early in the second half St Helens scored a try when centre David Traynor took the ball on the halfway line and beat four Batley players before touching down. The St Helens fightback did not last long as Batley flanker John T. 'Paudy' Munns scored Batley's second try to make the score 10–3 which remained the score at the final whistle.

After the game the cup was presented by Mrs Louisa Waller, the wife of the president of the Northern Union, Henry Hirst Waller. Mrs Waller presented the Batley players with commemorative gold medals and the St Helens players with silver medals.

24 April 1897
3:30 pm

Batley	10–3	St Helens
Try: Goodall, Munns; Drop goal: Oakland	Manchester Guardian report	Try: Traynor

Headingley, Leeds
Attendance: 13,492
Referee: J. H. Smith (Widnes)
Touch Judges: H.H. Waller (Brighouse Rangers), J. P. Warren (Warrington)

=== Squads ===
Batley				Number	St Helens			
Name	Height	Weight	Age	Number	Name	Height	Weight	Age
Fullback
Arthur Garner	5 ft 7 in (170 cm)	10 st 7 lb (67 kg; 147 lb)	26	1	Tom Foulkes (c)	5 ft 7 in (170 cm)	11 st 10 lb (74 kg; 164 lb)	25
Three-quarter backs
Wattie Davies	5 ft 5 in (165 cm)	11 st 6 lb (73 kg; 160 lb)	23	2	Bob Doherty	5 ft 4 in (163 cm)	10 st 6 lb (66 kg; 146 lb)	28
Dai Fitzgerald	5 ft 11 in (180 cm)	12 st 0 lb (76 kg; 168 lb)	24	3	David Traynor	5 ft 8 in (173 cm)	12 st 4 lb (78 kg; 172 lb)	22
John Goodall (c)	5 ft 7 in (170 cm)	11 st 4 lb (72 kg; 158 lb)	22	4	Jim Barnes	5 ft 9 in (175 cm)	10 st 10 lb (68 kg; 150 lb)	21
Ike Shaw	5 ft 6 in (168 cm)	10 st 4 lb (65 kg; 144 lb)	29	5	Billy Jacques	5 ft 6 in (168 cm)	10 st 10 lb (68 kg; 150 lb)	22
Half-backs
Joe Oakland	5 ft 8 in (173 cm)	11 st 0 lb (70 kg; 154 lb)	21	6	Richard O'Hara	5 ft 5 in (165 cm)	11 st 0 lb (70 kg; 154 lb)	21
Harry Goodall	5 ft 7 1/2 in (171 cm)	11 st 7 lb (73 kg; 161 lb)	23	7	Freddie Little	5 ft 4 1/2 in (164 cm)	10 st 11 lb (68 kg; 151 lb)	26
Forwards
Mark Shackleton	6 ft 0 in (183 cm)	14 st 0 lb (89 kg; 196 lb)	27	8	Tom Winstanley	5 ft 11 in (180 cm)	14 st 1 lb (89 kg; 197 lb)	26
Jim Gath	5 ft 9 in (175 cm)	11 st 7 lb (73 kg; 161 lb)	21	9	Billy Briers	5 ft 6 1/2 in (169 cm)	11 st 11 lb (75 kg; 165 lb)	22
George Main	5 ft 7 1/2 in (171 cm)	10 st 11 lb (68 kg; 151 lb)	21	10	William Winstanley	5 ft 7 in (170 cm)	12 st 8 lb (80 kg; 176 lb)	28
Robert Spurr	5 ft 11 in (180 cm)	12 st 7 lb (79 kg; 175 lb)	23	11	Tom Reynolds	5 ft 10 in (178 cm)	12 st 4 lb (78 kg; 172 lb)	27
Fred Fisher	5 ft 8 in (173 cm)	12 st 8 lb (80 kg; 176 lb)	24	12	Joe Thompson	5 ft 8 1/2 in (174 cm)	13 st 0 lb (83 kg; 182 lb)	24
Charlie Stubley	5 ft 7 in (170 cm)	12 st 7 lb (79 kg; 175 lb)	27	13	Peter Dale	5 ft 7 in (170 cm)	12 st 7 lb (79 kg; 175 lb)	25
Jim Littlewood	5 ft 9 in (175 cm)	12 st 0 lb (76 kg; 168 lb)	23	14	Sam Rimmer	5 ft 7 1/2 in (171 cm)	12 st 0 lb (76 kg; 168 lb)	27
John Munns	5 ft 9 in (175 cm)	13 st 4 lb (84 kg; 186 lb)	22	15	Bill Whiteley	5 ft 9 in (175 cm)	12 st 2 lb (77 kg; 170 lb)	25
