= 1917–18 Northern Rugby Football Union Wartime Emergency League season =

- League: Northern Rugby League Wartime Emergency League

1917–18 Season
- Champions: Barrow
- Runners-up: Dewsbury

The 1917–18 Northern Rugby Football Union season was the third season of Rugby league's Wartime Emergency League football. Each club played a differing number of fixtures, depending upon the closeness of neighbours, ease of travel etc., with Rochdale Hornets playing (and losing) only 7 games and St. Helens 18 while Wigan played 35 and several other clubs 31.

== Season summary ==
The war was starting its fourth year and the Rugby League again continued with the Wartime Emergency League set up. This arrangement, as in other sports, meant that the sport could continue, which in turn would boost the public’s moral. The fixtures were usually quite local, thus cutting down on travelling time and costs, whilst not wasting precious war resources.

Due to the increasing difficulty of raising a full team of 13 players, the Northern Union gave approval for clubs to field 11 or 12 players in their fixtures, on the condition that both clubs agreed to it.

Several clubs did not participate during this season :-

Huddersfield
Oldham
Wakefield Trinity withdrew again
York withdrew
Keighley again did not take part and in fact did not re-enter the league until the first peacetime League in 1919-20.

No clubs re-joined the League and no new clubs joined the league for this season.

Barrow (90.91%) finished the regular season top of the league (40 points) although only playing 22 games, with Dewsbury (87.10%) this time in second place (with 54 points from 31 games)..
Barrow took the title for the first time in their history.

There were no other trophies to play for during this season.

== Championship ==
	Team	P	W	D	L	PF	PA	diff	Pts	%	Note	ref
1	Barrow	22	20	0	2	425	59	366	40	90.91		
2	Dewsbury	31	27	0	4	480	149	331	54	87.10		
3	Leeds	31	21	3	7	479	214	265	45	72.58		
4	Hull	24	17	0	7	318	261	57	34	70.83		
5	Broughton Rangers	29	19	3	7	345	130	215	41	70.69		
6	Leigh	31	19	2	10	343	106	237	40	64.52		
7	Halifax	26	16	0	10	233	181	52	32	61.54		
8	St Helens Recs	29	16	3	10	270	132	138	35	60.34		
9	Wigan	35	21	0	14	331	210	121	42	60.00		
10	Warrington	31	16	4	11	236	210	26	36	58.06		
11	Widnes	20	9	4	7	189	146	43	22	55.00		
12	Swinton	22	11	1	10	156	208	-52	23	52.27		
13	Batley	23	10	1	12	165	191	-26	21	45.65		
14	Bradford Northern	26	10	2	14	156	260	-104	22	42.31		
15	Hunslet	30	11	1	18	311	314	-3	23	38.33		
16	Bramley	25	6	2	17	186	262	-76	14	28.00		
17	St. Helens	18	4	2	12	94	261	-167	10	27.78		
18	Brighouse Rangers	20	4	2	14	75	302	-227	10	25.00		
19	Hull Kingston Rovers	25	1	1	23	125	501	-376	3	6.00		
20	Salford	28	1	1	26	54	499	-445	3	5.36		
21	Runcorn	19	1	0	18	51	277	-226	2	5.26		
22	Rochdale Hornets	7	0	0	7	7	156	-149	0	0		

== Challenge Cup ==
The Challenge Cup Competition was suspended for the duration of the war.
The majority of the trophies, such as the County Leagues and County Cups were also suspended for the duration of the First World War.

== See also ==
British rugby league system
1915–16 Northern Rugby Football Union Wartime Emergency League season
1916–17 Northern Rugby Football Union Wartime Emergency League season
1918–1919 (January) Northern Rugby Football Union Wartime Emergency League season
1919 (Feb-May) Northern Rugby Football Union Victory season
The Great Schism – Rugby League View
The Great Schism – Rugby Union View
List of defunct rugby league clubs
