= 1916–17 Northern Rugby Football Union Wartime Emergency League season =

- League: Northern Rugby League Wartime Emergency League

1916–17 Season
- Champions: Dewsbury
- Runners-up: Leeds

The 1916–17 Northern Rugby Football Union season was the second season of Rugby league's Wartime Emergency League football. Each club played a differing number of fixtures, depending upon the closeness of neighbours, ease of travel etc., with Brighouse Rangers and Barrow playing 17 games each while Broughton Rangers played 35 and several other clubs 32.

== Season summary ==
The war was starting its third year and the Rugby League decided to continue with the Wartime Emergency League. This arrangement, as in other sports, meant that the sport could continue, which in turn would boost the public’s moral. The fixtures were usually quite local, thus cutting down on travelling time and costs, whilst not wasting precious war resources.

Several clubs did not participate during this season :-

The Featherstone Rovers who joined for the previous season 1915–16 left the league and the name did not appear in the (semi) professional ranks until they joined the Northern Rugby Football League for the 1921–22 season.
Keighley again did not take part and in fact did not re-enter the league until the first peacetime League in 1919–20.

Several of the clubs who had not participated in the competition in the previous season, now re-joined the League :-

Wakefield Trinity
Warrington
Widnes

No new clubs joined the league for this season.

Dewsbury (81.25%) again finished the regular season top of the league, with Leeds (80.65%) again second.
Dewsbury had played one game more, winning this and gaining two points more than Leeds, thus ending the season with a better win percentage.
Dewsbury again took the title.

There were no other trophies to play for during this season.

== Championship ==
	Team	P	W	D	L	PF	PA	diff	Pts	%	Note	ref
1	Dewsbury	32	26	0	6	542	170	372	52	81.25		
2	Leeds	31	23	4	4	452	107	345	50	80.65		
3	Leigh	28	20	2	6	317	143	174	42	75		
4	Barrow	17	12	0	5	225	57	168	24	70.59		
5	Wigan	32	21	0	11	340	168	172	42	65.63		
6	Batley	29	16	6	7	309	176	133	38	65.52		
7	Hull	31	18	1	12	439	319	120	37	59.68		
8	Swinton	32	17	1	14	252	197	55	35	54.69		
9	Hull Kingston Rovers	25	12	3	10	180	241	-61	27	54		
10	Halifax	28	14	2	12	182	226	-44	30	53.57		
11	Widnes	21	10	2	9	145	122	23	22	52.38	1	
12	Warrington	30	14	2	14	258	205	53	30	50	1	
13	St Helens Recs	30	14	1	15	228	211	17	29	48.33		
14	Bradford Northern	26	12	1	13	190	226	-36	25	48.08		
15	Bramley	24	9	5	10	150	156	-6	23	47.92		
16	Wakefield Trinity	18	7	3	8	119	141	-22	17	47.22	1	
17	Oldham	23	10	1	12	138	221	-83	21	45.65		
18	Hunslet	30	12	3	15	266	297	-31	27	45		
19	Broughton Rangers	35	15	1	19	228	266	-38	31	44.29		
20	Salford	30	12	1	17	194	228	-34	25	41.67		
21	St. Helens	23	8	0	15	138	266	-128	16	34.78		
22	Runcorn	18	5	0	13	56	265	-209	10	27.78		
23	Huddersfield	26	4	4	18	129	368	-239	12	23.08		
24	Rochdale Hornets	26	5	1	20	73	283	-210	11	21.15		
25	Brighouse Rangers	17	1	0	16	59	311	-252	2	5.88		
26	York	18	1	0	17	81	320	-239	2	5.56		

== Challenge Cup ==
The Challenge Cup Competition was suspended for the duration of the war.
The majority of the trophies, such as the County Leagues and County Cups were also suspended for the duration of the First World War.

== Notes and Comments ==
1 - re-joined the League

== See also ==
British rugby league system
1915–16 Northern Rugby Football Union Wartime Emergency League season
1917–18 Northern Rugby Football Union Wartime Emergency League season
1918–1919 (January) Northern Rugby Football Union Wartime Emergency League season
1919 (Feb-May) Northern Rugby Football Union Victory season
The Great Schism – Rugby League View
The Great Schism – Rugby Union View
List of defunct rugby league clubs
