= Billy Jacques =

English rugby footballer (1871-1957)

Personal information
- Born: 3 July 1871; Kingston upon Hull, England
- Died: December 1957 (aged 86) unknown

Playing information
- Height: 5 ft 6 in (1.68 m)
- Weight: 10 st 10 lb (68 kg; 150 lb)

Rugby union
Representative
Years	Team	Pld	T	G	FG	P
≤1895–≤95	Yorkshire

Rugby league
- Position: Wing, Centre
Club
Years	Team	Pld	T	G	FG	P
≤1895–95	Hull FC
1895–97	St. Helens	50	6	25	4	96
1897–02	Hull FC
	Total	50	6	25	4	96

Billy Jacques (3 July 1871 – December 1957) was a rugby union and professional rugby league footballer who played in the 1890s and 1900s. He played representative level rugby union for Yorkshire, and at club level for Hull F.C. (Prior to the 1895–96 Northern Rugby Football Union season, Hull F.C. was a rugby union club), and club level rugby league for St Helens and Hull FC, as a goal-kicking wing or centre.

Jacques played for Hull F.C. before joining St. Helens in December 1895. He made his début against Oldham, but his appearance breached the rules, as neither Hull F.C. nor the Northern Rugby Football Union committee had given permission for the transfer to go ahead. As a result, Saints were deducted two points for fielding an ineligible player. He went to make 50 appearances for the club, with his last appearance coming in the 1897 Challenge Cup Final defeat against Batley. He rejoined Hull F.C. in 1897. In 1898–99, he was the season's top point scorer. Jacques played 122 games for Hull FC, scoring 370 points (32 tries and 137 goals).
