= 1915–16 Northern Rugby Football Union Wartime Emergency League season =

- League: Northern Rugby League Wartime Emergency League

1915–16 Season
- Champions: Dewsbury
- Runners-up: Leeds

The 1915–16 Northern Rugby Football Union season was the first season of Rugby league's Wartime Emergency League football. Each club played a differing number of fixtures, depending upon the closeness of neighbours, ease of travel etc., with York playing only 11 and Barrow 13 while Salford played 35 and Dewsbury 36.

== Season summary ==
Although the war was starting its second year, the Rugby League decided to introduce a Wartime Emergency League. This arrangement, as in other sports, meant that the sport could continue, which in turn would boost the public’s moral. The fixtures were usually quite local, thus cutting down on travelling time and costs, whilst not wasting precious war resources.

Several clubs did not participate during this season :-

Wakefield Trinity
Warrington
Widnes
Keighley, who did not re-enter until the first Peacetime League in 1919-20.

Three new clubs joined the league for this season :-

St Helens Recs, originally the works team for Pilkington Glass. There are now two clubs playing in St Helens.
A reformed Brighouse Rangers.
A team called Featherstone Rovers. The Featherstone Rovers who currently play in the Rugby League merged with Purston White Horse ARLFC in 1913 and did not become a semi-professional club until 14 June 1921. This newly entered club only remained in the league for one season.

Dewsbury and Leeds finished the regular season joint top of the league, based on the % system, both having obtained an 83.33% success, but Dewsbury took the title due to them having gained an extra 5 points (from the 3 extra games played).

There were no other trophies to play for during this season.

== Championship ==
	Team	P	W	D	L	PF	PA	diff	Pts	%	Note	ref
1	Dewsbury	36	29	2	5	512	157	355	60	83.33		
2	Leeds	33	27	1	5	469	174	295	55	83.33		
3	Hull	32	23	2	7	563	247	316	48	75		
4	Wigan	33	21	3	9	306	191	115	45	68.18		
5	Swinton	28	17	2	9	192	128	64	36	64.29		
6	Huddersfield	30	18	2	10	342	231	111	38	63.33		
7	St Helens Recs	26	15	2	9	255	99	156	32	61.54	1	
8	Leigh	23	13	2	8	141	82	59	28	60.87		
9	Salford	35	17	5	13	272	273	-1	39	55.71		
10	Hull Kingston Rovers	32	16	3	13	404	286	118	35	54.69		
11	Batley	28	12	5	11	194	140	54	29	51.79		
12	Barrow	13	5	2	6	116	141	-25	12	46.15		
13	St. Helens	26	10	3	13	188	259	-71	23	44.23		
14	Hunslet	34	13	4	17	281	400	-119	30	44.12		
15	Featherstone Rovers	17	7	1	9	148	223	-5	15	44.12	2	
16	Bradford Northern	31	13	0	18	252	313	-61	26	41.94		
17	Oldham	31	9	4	18	163	253	-90	22	35.48		
18	Bramley	27	8	3	16	137	212	-75	19	35.19		
19	Rochdale Hornets	33	9	3	21	146	261	-115	21	31.82		
20	York	14	3	2	9	99	312	-213	8	28.57		
21	Broughton Rangers	29	7	2	20	148	325	-177	16	27.59		
22	Halifax	31	7	0	24	215	408	-193	14	22.58		
23	Runcorn	14	1	2	11	37	192	-155	4	14.29		
24	Brighouse Rangers	22	1	1	20	71	344	-273	3	6.82	3	

== Challenge Cup ==
The Challenge Cup Competition was suspended for the duration of the war.

The majority of the trophies, such as the County Leagues and County Cups were also suspended for the duration of the First World War.

== Notes and Comments ==
1 - A new team St Helens Recs who would continue in the League until 1939
2 - A new team, Featherstone Rovers joined the league for this season only
3 - A newly reformed Brighouse Rangers also joined for this season

== See also ==
- British rugby league system
- 1915–16 Northern Rugby Football Union Wartime Emergency League season
- 1916–17 Northern Rugby Football Union Wartime Emergency League season
- 1917–18 Northern Rugby Football Union Wartime Emergency League season
- 1918–1919 (January) Northern Rugby Football Union Wartime Emergency League season
- 1919 (Feb-May) Northern Rugby Football Union Victory season
- The Great Schism – Rugby League View
- The Great Schism – Rugby Union View
- List of defunct rugby league clubs
