= Stockport RFC =

Defunct English professional rugby league club and Northern Union founder member

Club information
- Full name: Stockport Rugby Football Club
- Founded: circa 1884; 142 years ago
- Exited: circa 1903; 123 years ago

Former details
- Ground: (1884–1890) Plough Ground, Shaw Heath, Stockport (1890–1891) Stockport Cricket Club (1891–1903) Edgeley Park
- Competition: Northern Rugby Football Union 1895–96–1902–03

Stockport RFC was a Rugby League club in Stockport, England.

The club became founder members of the Northern Rugby Football Union (now Rugby Football League) after the English rugby schism, and resultant breakaway meeting at the George Hotel, Huddersfield, in 1895.

They played for eight seasons in the seasons 1895–96 to 1902–03, when they finished bottom of the newly instituted Division Two.

Like several other Cheshire clubs, they participated in the Lancashire competitions.

They had a rivalry with fellow Cheshire side Runcorn RFC.

== History ==
=== Early days ===
Stockport RFC was founded 1884 by men associated with Stockport Sunday School, the largest such school in the world at the time.

The club first played on a field behind their HQ - The Plough Inn, Shaw Heath and the first gate was 3sh 9d. = 19p.

On 12 January 1889 they played a friendly against the Maori touring team, which attracted around 4,000 spectators and ended up in a 3-3 draw. The Maoris had just come off of beating Ireland, Wigan, St Helens, Salford, and Swansea, among others, so the draw was a somewhat notable feat. This was the 42nd game of the 1888/89 Maori tour.

They managed to attract top Lancs & Yorks clubs to the Plough ground and such was the rise in popularity that they moved in with Stockport Cricket Club at Cale Green in 1890, averaging crowds of 3,000.

=== Northern Union ===
Before the break with Rugby Union, Stockport, like many other clubs from Lancashire and Yorkshire, had suffered punishment by the RFU for "broken time" payments. When the 22 clubs met at The George Hotel, Huddersfield, the representative of Stockport had been unable to attend the meeting personally and so had telegraphed the meeting requesting the club's admission to the new organisation. This was duly accepted.

After the Great Schism in 1895, Stockport were one of the founder members of the new league. In the first season 1895–96 the league consisted of 22 clubs and Stockport finished in 17th position.

In the second season 1896–97 the league was divided into Yorkshire and Lancashire, Stockport playing in the latter section, where they would stay for all but one of the remainder of their semi-professional existence. They finished in 5th position out of 14 teams.

In the two following seasons, still in the Lancashire section, season 1897–98 and 1898–99 they finished in 11th position out of 14 teams.

In the fifth season, 1899–1900 they improved slightly finishing 9th out of 14 teams. This was also their most successful season in the Challenge Cup, they defeated Hunslet 2-0, Tyldesley 5-2 and Radcliffe 24-3 before bowing out in the Quarter-Finals losing 0-3 to Widnes.

In 1900–01, still in the Lancashire Senior League, Stockport dropped to 12th place out the 14 teams.

In 1901–02 14 clubs broke away to form the Northern Rugby League. Stockport were not among these, and as a result of this, interest and gates dwindled, so together with the remaining clubs and several additions from the lower county leagues, continued in the Lancashire Senior league, which became in effect division 2 (West). A slightly better season saw a mid-table finish in 6th place out of the 13 clubs.

At the end of the 1901–02 season, the County Leagues elected 18 teams to join the new Division 2 (7 from Lancashire and 10 from Yorkshire and new member South Shields) with the existing second competition scrapped.

In 1902–03 Stockport were elected into the new 2nd Division losing many of their top pro players, In this, their eighth and last season among the semi-professional clubs, Stockport finished 18th out of 18 clubs, bottom of the league with only 11 points, whereas Morecambe, the second bottom, had 20 points.

In May 1903, the town’s rugby and football clubs met and it was suggested that the rugby club should disband. Nothing was decided but the debate lingered and the Yorkshire Post of 16 July 1903 reported: “Certain conditions have been drawn up in connection with the proposed transfer of the ground to the Association club and it is understood they will be in all probability accepted. The opinion prevails that the Rugby Club will shortly disband.”

At a meeting on Saturday 15 August 1903, the plan to disband was confirmed. Stockport County F.C took over £350 in liabilities owed to a well-known gentleman [Mr Sykes] in the town. The rugby club, it was reported, had been sorely tried by the rapid strides made by the association game in Stockport and had fallen deeper into debt. The last Captain, Yorkshireman William Robinson, took a tobacconist’s shop on Castle street, Edgeley.

"(Stockport) County gained admission to the Second Division of the Football League in 1900, and following this elevation - and consequent requirement for a larger ground - the club moved to its current home of Edgeley Park in 1902, which was then the home of Stockport Rugby League Club. The rugby club folded a few years later, leaving County as sole tenants."

=== Stadium ===
Stockport RFC first played on a field behind their Headquarters - The Plough Inn, Shaw Heath. The cost of entry to the first gate was 3sh 9d. = 19p.

In 1890 they moved in with Stockport Cricket Club at Beech road, Cale Green.

In 1891 they moved into the newly built Edgeley Park, the land the stadium was built on was donated to the club by the Sykes Family, Owner’s of Sykes Bleaching Company

== Colours ==
The club's colour was maroon.

== Records ==
=== Club scoring record ===
In a Season
	Details	Season	Competition		Notes	Ref
Highest League Position	5	1896–97	Lancs Sen Comp	Out of 14 clubs		
Lowest League Position	18	1902–03	2nd Div	Out of 18 clubs		
Most League Points	32	1895–96	RL	Out of possible 84 = 38%		
or	30	1896–97	Lancs Sen Comp	Out of possible 52 = 58%		
Fewest League Points	11	1902–03	2nd Div	Out of possible 68 = 16%		
Most Points Scored (PF)	171	1895–96	RL	In 42 games = 4.07/game		
or	157	1896–97	Lancs Sen Comp	In 26 games = 6.04/game		
Most Points Conceded (PA)	317	1898–99	Lancs Sen Comp	In 26 games = 12.2/game		
Fewest Points Scored (PF)	69	1902–03	2nd Div	In 34 games = 2.03/game		
Fewest Points Conceded (PA)	136	1899–1900	Lancs Sen Comp	In 26 games = 5.23/game		
Best Points Difference	20	1896–97	Lancs Sen Comp	In 26 games		
Worst Points Difference	-276	1902–03	2nd Div	In 26 games		

=== Club records ===
- Best League performance: 5th(out of 14 clubs) 1896/97 Northern Rugby Football Union(Lancs Senior)
- Best Challenge cup performance: Quarter-Final 1899/1900
- Highest attendance: Approximately 10,000(at Plough ground) 1895/96 Northern Rugby Football Union

== Club league record ==
Season	Competition	Pos	Team Name	Pl	W	D	L	PF	PA	Diff	Pts	% Pts	No of teams in league	Notes	Ref
1895–96	Northern Rugby Football Union	17	Stockport	42	12	8	22	171	315	-144		32	22		
1896–97	NRFU(Lancs Senior)	5	Stockport	26	14	2	10	157	137	20		30	14		
1897–98	NRFU(Lancs Senior)	11	Stockport	26	8	2	16	154	253	–99		18	14		
1898–99	NRFU(Lancs Senior)	11	Stockport	26	5	1	20	102	317	-215		11	14		
1899–1900	NRFU(Lancs Senior)	9	Stockport	26	10	2	14	126	136	-10		22	14		
1900–01	NRFU(Lancs Senior)	12	Stockport	26	6	3	17	102	184	-82		15	14		
1901–02	NRFU(Lancs Senior)	6	Stockport	24	13	3	8	151	106	45		27	13		
Stockport had 2 points deducted.
Only limited County League information is available for this season.
1902–03	NRFU(2nd Division)	18	Stockport	34	5	1	28	69	348	-279		11	18		

Heading Abbreviations
Pl = Games played; W = Win; D = Draw; L = Lose; PF = Points for; PA = Points against; Diff = Points difference (+ or -); Pts = League Points
League points: for win = 2; for draw = 1; for loss = 0.

== Several fixtures and results ==
The following are just a few of Stockport's fixtures from the eight seasons in which they played (semi) professional Rugby League :-

Season	Date	Competition	Opponent	Venue	H/A	Result	Score	Attendance	Notes	Ref
1895–96	Sat 28 Sep 1895	RL	St. Helens	Knowsley Rd	A	Won	3–0			
1895–96	26 Oct 1895	RL	Warrington	Edgeley Park	H	Draw	3–3			
1895–96	Sat 9 Nov 1895	RL	Hull	Edgeley Park	H	Won	3–0			
1895–96	30 Nov 1895	RL	Widnes	Edgeley Park	H	Lost	0–5			
1895–96	Wed 25 Dec 1895	RL	Wigan	Folly Fields	A	Lost	0–16		1	
1895–96	-1-–0-1896	RL	Widnes	Lowerhouse Lane	A	Lost	10–14		2	
1895–96	Sat 18 Jan 1896	RL	St. Helens	Edgeley Park	H	Won	18–3			
1895–96	Sat 7 Mar 1896	RL	Hull	Boulevard	A	Lost	5–15			
1895–96	6 Apr 1896	RL	Warrington	Wilderspool	A	Lost	3–14			
1895–96	Sun 26 Apr 1896	RL	Wigan	Edgeley Park	H	Won	8–3			
1896–97	Sat 12 Sep 1896	Lancs Sen Comp	Wigan	Edgeley Park	H	Won	12–0			
1896–97	19 Sep 1896	Lancs Sen Comp	Warrington	Edgeley Park	H	Won	15–5			
1896–97	Mon 12 Oct 1896	Friendly	Hull	Boulevard	A	Won	5–0			
1896–97	5 Dec 1896	Lancs Sen Comp	Widnes	Edgeley Park	H	Won	12–3			
1896–97	Sat 19 Dec 1896	Lancs Sen Comp	St. Helens	Edgeley Park	H	Won	13–6			
1896–97	9 Jan 1897	Lancs Sen Comp	Widnes	Lowerhouse Lane	A	Lost	0–9		2	
1896–97	13 Feb 1897	Lancs Sen Comp	Warrington	Wilderspool	A	Lost	5–9			
1896–97	Sat 13 Mar 1897	Lancs Sen Comp	St. Helens	Knowsley Rd	A	Lost	0–9			
1896–97	Wed 17 Mar 1897	Lancs Sen Comp	Wigan	Folly Fields	A	Draw	0–0		1	
1897–98	25 Sep 1897	Lancs Sen Comp	Warrington	Wilderspool	A	Lost	7–10			
1897–98	27 Nov 1897	Lancs Sen Comp	Widnes	Lowerhouse Lane	A	Lost	0–6			
1897–98	Sat 11 Dec 1897	Lancs Sen Comp	St. Helens	Edgeley Park	H	Won	14–7			
1897–98	Sat 8 Jan 1898	Lancs Sen Comp	Wigan	Edgeley Park	H	Lost	4–6			
1897–98	29 Jan 1898	Lancs Sen Comp	Warrington	Edgeley Park	H	Won	13–3			
1897–98	12 Feb 1898	Lancs Sen Comp	Widnes	Edgeley Park	H	Lost	5–9			
1897–98	Sat 19 Feb 1898	Lancs Sen Comp	St. Helens	Knowsley Rd	A	Lost	0–27			
1897–98	Fri 8 Apr 1898	Lancs Sen Comp	Wigan	Folly Fields	A	Draw	5–5		1	
1898–99	Sat 8 Oct 1898	Lancs Sen Comp	Wigan	Folly Fields	A	Lost	8–19		1	
1898–99	17 Dec 1898	Lancs Sen Comp	Warrington	Wilderspool	A	Lost	6–8			
1898–99	7 Jan 1899	Lancs Sen Comp	Widnes	Edgeley Park	H	Lost	0–10			
1898–99	14 Jan 1899	Lancs Sen Comp	Widnes	Lowerhouse Lane	A	Lost	10–26		2	
1898–99	Sat 25 Feb 1899	Lancs Sen Comp	Wigan	Edgeley Park	H	Won	3–0			
1898–99	Sat 4 Mar 1899	Lancs Sen Comp	St. Helens	Edgeley Park	H	Lost	3–13			
1898–99	1 Apr 1899	Lancs Sen Comp	Warrington	Edgeley Park	H	Won	12–2			
1898–99	Thu 20 Apr 1899	Lancs Sen Comp	St. Helens	Knowsley Rd	A	Lost	10–13			
1899–1900	9 Sep 1899	Lancs Sen Comp	Wigan	Edgeley Park	H	Won	18–5			
1899–1900	16 Sep 1899	Lancs Sen Comp	Warrington	Wilderspool	A	Lost	0–15			
1899–1900	Sat 21 Oct 1899	Lancs Sen Comp	St. Helens	Knowsley Rd	A	Lost	3–17			
1899–1900	4 Nov 1899	Lancs Sen Comp	Warrington	Edgeley Park	H	Lost	0–3			
1899–1900	Sat 25 Nov 1899	Lancs Sen Comp	St. Helens	Edgeley Park	H	Lost	3–6			
1899–1900	30 Dec 1899	Lancs Sen Comp	Widnes	Edgeley Park	H	Won	21–3			
1899–1900	24 Feb 1900	Lancs Sen Comp	Widnes	Lowerhouse Lane	A	Lost	0–2		2	
1899–1900	10 Mar 1900	Lancs Sen Comp	Wigan	Folly Fields	A	Lost	0–2			
1899–1900	7 Apr 1900	Challenge Cup QF	Widnes	Edgeley Park	H	Lost	0–3			
1900–01	22 Sep 1900	Lancs Sen Comp	Warrington	Edgeley Park	H	Won	8–3			
1900–01	Sat 6 Oct 1900	Lancs Sen Comp	St. Helens	Knowsley Rd	A	Lost	0–3			
1900–01	24 Nov 1900	Lancs Sen Comp	Widnes	Lowerhouse Lane	A	Lost	0–5		2	
1900–01	Sat 1 Dec 1900	Lancs Sen Comp	St. Helens	Edgeley Park	H	Won	5–0			
1900–01	23 Feb 1901	Lancs Sen Comp	Warrington	Wilderspool	A	Lost	3–10			
1900–01	Sat 9 Mar 1901	CC R2	St. Helens	Knowsley Rd	A	Draw	0–0			
1900–01	Wed 13 Mar 1901	CC R2 Replay	St. Helens	Edgeley Park	H	Lost	5–11			
1900–01	16 Mar 1901	Lancs Sen Comp	Widnes	Edgeley Park	H	Won	13–0			
1900–01	6 Apr 1901	Lancs Sen Comp	Wigan	Folly Fields	A	Lost	2–9		1	
1900–01	13 Apr 1901	Lancs Sen Comp	Wigan	Edgeley Park	H	Won	13–0			
1901–02	Sat 12 Oct 1901	Lancs Sen Comp	St. Helens	Edgeley Park	H	Won	3–0			
1901–02	2 Nov 1901	Lancs Sen Comp	Widnes	Edgeley Park	H	Lost	0–2			
1901–02	25 Dec 1901	Lancs Sen Comp	Wigan	Edgeley Park	H	Won	6–5			
1901–02	1 Jan 1902	Lancs Sen Comp	Wigan	Springfield Park	A	Lost	3–10		3	
1901–02	Sat 18 Jan 1902	Lancs Sen Comp	St. Helens	Knowsley Rd	A	Lost	7–13			
1901–02	25 Jan 1902	Lancs Sen Comp	Widnes	Lowerhouse Lane	A	Lost	0–12		2	
1902–03	14 Feb 1903	CC R1	Wigan	Springfield Park	A	Lost	0–8		3	

Heading Abbreviations
CC Rx = Challenge Cup Round x; LC Rx = Lancashire Cup Competition; JPT Rx = John Player Trophy; REGAL Rx = Regal Trophy.

== Notes and comments ==
1 - Folly Fields is the stadium used by Wigan at the time until 1901. They then became sub-tenants of Springfield Park See below - Note 3.

2 - Lowerhouse Lane is the original site of the current ground used by Widnes. It was renamed Naughton Park in 1932 in honour of club secretary, Tom Naughton - and later renamed Halton Stadium after being completely rebuilt in 1997.

3 - Wigan became sub-tenants of Springfield Park, which they shared with Wigan United AFC, playing their first game there on 14 September 1901 at which a crowd of 4,000 saw them beat Morecambe 12–0, and the last game on 28 April 1902 when Wigan beat the Rest of Lancashire Senior Competition. A temporary ground was necessary to span the period between moving from Folly Fields and the new ground at Central Park being constructed.

== See also ==
- 1897 Challenge Cup
- Rugby Football League
- 1895–96 Northern Rugby Football Union season
- 1896–97 Northern Rugby Football Union season
- 1897–98 Northern Rugby Football Union season
- 1898–99 Northern Rugby Football Union season
- 1899–1900 Northern Rugby Football Union season
- 1900–01 Northern Rugby Football Union season
- 1901–02 Northern Rugby Football Union season
- 1902–03 Northern Rugby Football Union season
- British rugby league system
- The Great Schism – Rugby League View
- The Great Schism – Rugby Union View
- Rugby league county leagues
- List of defunct rugby league clubs
- Stockport - sport
