= 1896–97 Northern Rugby Football Union season =

- Structure: County Championships

1896–97 Season
- Top point-scorer: Rigg ( Halifax) 112
- Top try-scorer: Hannah ( Hunslet) 19
- Joined League: Yorkshire; Bramley; Castleford; Heckmondwike; Holbeck; Leeds Parish Church; Lancashire; Morecambe; Swinton; Salford

Lancashire Senior Competition
- Champions: Broughton Rangers
- Runners-up: Oldham

Yorkshire Senior Competition
- Champions: Brighouse Rovers
- Runners-up: Manningham

The 1896–97 Northern Rugby Football Union season was the second season of rugby league football. Following the success of the Northern Union's first season, several more clubs from the established Rugby Football Union joined the rebel competition. This resulted in the decision that for the 1896–97 season the competition should be split into two separate county championships: Lancashire and Yorkshire. This season also saw the introduction of the Challenge Cup, with Batley defeating St Helens in the inaugural final.

== Season summary ==
Eight new teams joined the twenty-two teams already in the breakaway Northern Union, and so it was split into two county leagues for the 1896–97 season. The new teams were Bramley, Castleford, Heckmondwike, Holbeck, Leeds Parish Church, Morecambe, Swinton and Salford. Salford's first game was a 10-0 defeat away to Widnes on 5 September 1896.

Mr J.E. Warren of the Warrington club was elected as the new President of the Northern Union. Warren, previously Warrington's secretary, had played a key role in Warrington's involvement in the foundation of the Northern Union.

The leading try scorer overall this season was Hannah of Hunslet, who crossed the line 19 times. The leading goal kickers were Albert Goldthorpe of Hunslet and Sharpe of Liversedge who both successful 26 times. The leading points scorer was Archie Rigg of Halifax with 112 points.

== Lancashire Senior Competition ==
After finishing second from the bottom of the competition in the previous season, Broughton Rangers made a remarkable turnaround to finish the 1896–97 competition at the top of the Lancashire division, just one competition point ahead of Oldham, who had won more matches and had a better points differential. Although participating in the Lancashire Senior Competition, Runcorn and Stockport were from Cheshire.

	Team	Pld	W	D	L	PF	PA	PD	Pts
1	Broughton Rangers	26	19	5	2	201	52	+149	43
2	Oldham	26	20	2	4	243	59	+184	42
3	Tyldesley	26	15	2	9	159	80	+79	32
4	Runcorn	26	13	5	8	134	62	+72	31
5	Stockport	26	14	2	10	157	137	+20	30
6	Swinton	26	12	5	9	125	82	+43	29
7	Warrington	26	11	5	10	100	124	-24	27
8	Leigh	26	11	4	11	105	147	-42	26
9	St. Helens	26	10	4	12	122	160	-38	24
10	Widnes	26	10	3	13	113	164	-51	23
11	Wigan	26	8	7	11	73	118	-45	23
12	Rochdale Hornets	26	8	1	17	121	167	-46	17
13	Salford	26	3	5	18	76	191	-115	11
14	Morecambe	26	3	0	23	52	238	-186	6

Source: R.L.Yearbook 1995–96 cited in "The Vault".
League points: for win = 2; for draw = 1; for loss = 0.
Pld = Games played; W = Wins; D = Draws; L = Losses; PF = Match points scored; PA = Match points conceded; PD = Points difference; Pts = League points.

== Yorkshire Senior Competition ==
The previous season's champions, Manningham continued their good form in the Northern Union's second season, finishing in second place. However Brighouse took the Yorkshire championship with one win more than Manningham.

	Team	Pld	W	D	L	PF	PA	PD	Pts
1	Brighouse Rangers	30	22	4	4	213	68	145	48
2	Manningham	30	21	4	5	291	129	162	46
3	Halifax	30	18	4	8	219	112	107	40
4	Hunslet	30	16	4	10	211	138	73	36
5	Hull	30	15	6	9	152	125	27	36
6	Batley	30	15	5	10	164	126	38	35
7	Bradford	30	15	3	12	170	157	13	33
8	Wakefield Trinity	30	13	4	13	172	154	18	30
9	Castleford	30	11	6	13	178	161	17	28
10	Huddersfield	30	10	7	13	142	179	-37	27
11	Liversedge	30	13	0	17	176	233	-57	26
12	Leeds	30	10	4	16	115	123	-8	24
13	Leeds Parish Church	30	9	4	17	129	162	-33	22
14	Bramley	30	9	3	18	101	193	-92	21
15	Holbeck	30	7	4	19	86	223	-137	18
16	Heckmondwike	30	3	4	23	72	308	-236	10

Source: R.L.Yearbook 1995–96 cited in "The Vault".
League points: for win = 2; for draw = 1; for loss = 0.
Pld = Games played; W = Wins; D = Draws; L = Losses; PF = Match points scored; PA = Match points conceded; PD = Points difference; Pts = League points.
