= 1918–19 Northern Rugby Football Union season =

- Structure: Separate county championships

1918–19 Season

Lancashire League
- Champions: Rochdale Hornets

Yorkshire League
- Champions: Hull

The 1918–19 Northern Rugby Football Union season was the first season of rugby league football following a break during the Great War. The ban on competitive matches was removed in September 1918, but official games did not restart until January 1919. The season consisted of the Lancashire League and Yorkshire League, but the Championship did not restart until the 1919–20 season.

Rochdale Hornets won the Lancashire League, and Hull F.C. won the Yorkshire League.

== Season summary ==
Unofficial competition resumed in September 1918, but due to the increasing difficulties of raising a team, and further restrictions on travel, very few clubs had arranged fixtures.

Following the end of the First World War, it was agreed to restart official competition in January 1919. Clubs competed in separate Lancashire and Yorkshire leagues.

== Tables ==
=== Lancashire League ===
	Team	Pld	W	D	L	PF	PA	Pts	Pct
1	Rochdale Hornets	13	10	0	3	109	53	20	76.92
2	Leigh	12	8	2	2	99	31	18	75.00
3	Wigan	11	7	1	3	164	87	15	68.18
4	Warrington	17	10	1	6	145	105	21	61.76
5	Barrow	5	3	0	2	52	66	6	60.00
6	Widnes	12	7	0	5	120	83	14	58.33
7	Salford	15	7	0	8	107	95	14	46.66
8	Oldham	14	6	1	7	159	121	13	46.43
9	St. Helens	9	3	0	6	29	109	6	33.33
10	St Helens Recs	13	3	2	8	75	134	8	30.77
11	Broughton Rangers	14	4	0	10	80	144	8	28.70
12	Swinton	15	3	1	11	64	179	7	23.33

=== Yorkshire League ===
	Team	Pld	W	D	L	PF	PA	Pts	Pct
1	Hull F.C.	16	13	0	3	392	131	26	81.25
2	Leeds	16	10	1	5	183	112	21	65.62
3	Bramley	14	8	1	5	140	89	17	60.71
4	Halifax	15	8	1	6	187	82	17	56.66
5	Dewsbury	13	5	4	4	150	100	14	53.85
6	Batley	15	7	1	7	77	117	15	50.00
7	Hull Kingston Rovers	14	5	2	7	129	139	12	42.85
8	Wakefield Trinity	14	4	2	8	73	156	10	35.71
9	York	4	1	0	3	18	141	2	25.00
10	Hunslet	13	3	0	10	97	262	6	23.03
11	Bradford Northern	10	2	0	8	51	168	4	20.00

== Challenge Cup ==
The Challenge Cup Competition was suspended for the final time following its absence during the war. The competition would return the following year.

== County cups ==
Rochdale Hornets beat Oldham 22–0 to win the Lancashire Cup, and Huddersfield beat Dewsbury 14–8 to win the Yorkshire Cup.
