= 1902–03 St Helens R.F.C. season =

- 1902–03 Northern Rugby Football Union season Rank: 12th
- Challenge Cup: Second round
- 1902–03 record: Wins: 10; draws: 2; losses: 24
- Points scored: For: 125; against: 309
← 1901–02	List of seasons	1903–04 →

The 1902–03 season was St Helens' eighth as members of the Northern Rugby Football Union, the 29th in their history. This season, the Northern Rugby Football Union split into two divisions for the first time. St Helens were placed in Division 1, but were relegated after finishing in a second-bottom 12th place. In the Challenge Cup, St Helens were beaten in the second round by Rochdale Hornets.

== NRFU Division 1 ==
	Team	Pld	W	D	L	PF	PA	Pts
1	Halifax	34	23	3	8	199	85	49
2	Salford	34	20	5	9	244	130	45
3	Swinton	34	18	7	9	254	119	43
4	Runcorn	34	19	4	11	239	139	42
5	Broughton Rangers	34	17	7	10	222	97	41
6	Oldham	34	20	0	14	200	128	40
7	Bradford	34	16	5	13	220	161	37
8	Warrington	34	14	7	13	148	164	35
9	Hunslet	34	16	3	15	185	220	35
10	Hull	34	16	2	16	204	192	34
11	Batley	34	15	4	15	176	214	34
12	Leigh	34	12	5	17	136	178	29
13	Widnes	34	13	2	19	131	167	28
14	Hull Kingston Rovers	34	13	2	19	155	215	28
15	Huddersfield	34	13	2	19	116	196	28
16	Wigan	34	10	6	18	125	174	26
17	St. Helens	34	9	2	23	125	309	20
18	Brighouse Rovers	34	7	4	23	79	270	18
