= 1903–04 St Helens R.F.C. season =

- 1903–04 Northern Rugby Football Union season Rank: 2nd
- Challenge Cup: Second round
- 1903–04 record: Wins: 24; draws: 3; losses: 7
- Points scored: For: 328; against: 105
← 1902–03	List of seasons	1904–05 →

The 1903–04 season was St Helens' ninth in the Northern Rugby Football Union, the 30th in the club's history. After the previous year's relegation from the first division, St Helens were able to earn promotion at the first attempt, finishing second behind Wakefield Trinity in Division 2. St Helens also competed in the end-of-season South West Lancashire mini-league, in which they finished third. In the Challenge Cup, St Helens were beaten in the second round by Halifax.

== NRFU Division 2 ==
	Team	Pld	W	D	L	PF	PA	Pts
1	Wakefield Trinity	32	27	1	4	389	57	55
2	St. Helens	32	23	3	6	328	105	49
3	Holbeck	32	24	1	7	256	120	49
4	Rochdale Hornets	32	22	2	8	319	104	46
5	York	32	20	1	11	244	97	41
6	Brighouse Rovers	32	19	3	10	192	136	41
7	Castleford	32	18	3	11	185	194	39
8	Bramley	32	16	4	12	181	180	36
9	Barrow	32	16	3	13	219	162	35
10	Pontefract	32	14	6	12	174	150	34
11	Dewsbury	32	12	3	17	185	205	27
12	Millom	32	12	2	18	185	209	26
13	Lancaster	32	8	2	22	129	291	18
14	Birkenhead	32	7	0	25	75	334	14
15	South Shields	32	6	1	25	140	336	13
16	Morecambe	32	5	3	24	72	287	13
17	Normanton	32	4	0	28	105	411	8
