= 1896–97 St Helens R.F.C. season =

- 1896–97 Northern Rugby Football Union season Rank: 9th
- Challenge Cup: Final
- 1898–99 record: Wins: 15; draws: 4; losses: 13
- Points scored: For: 122; against: 160
← 1895–96	List of seasons	1897–98 →

The 1896–97 season was St Helens' second in the Northern Rugby Football Union. In a divided county championship league, the club finished 9th out of 14. The Challenge Cup was also established that year, and it was St Helens, with Batley who contested the first final; St Helens losing 10-3 with Derek Traynor scoring Saints' only points.

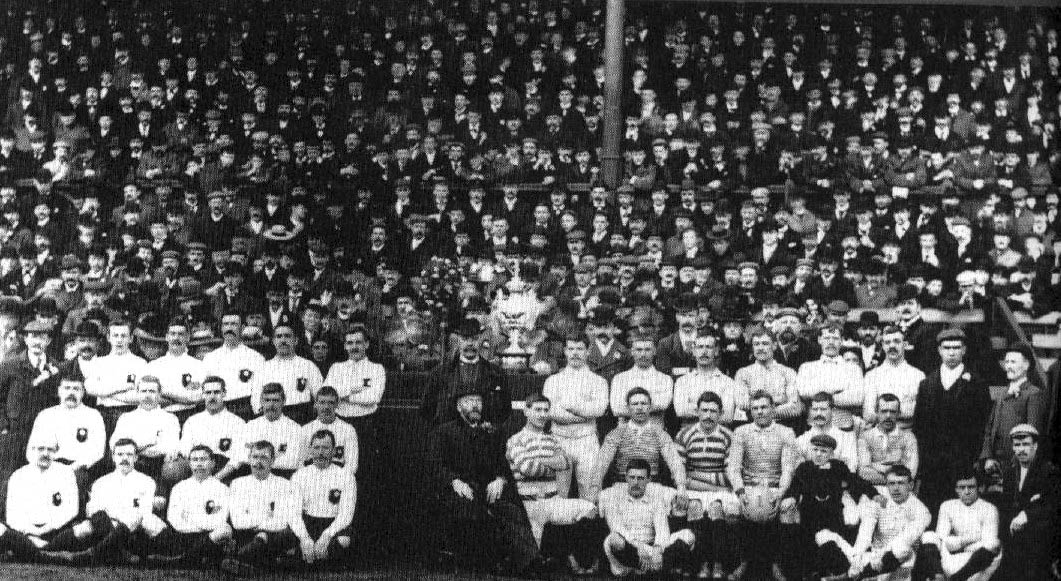
Saints are pictured in the first ever Challenge Cup Final, 1897: Batley (left) vs St Helens (right)

== Lancashire Senior Championship ==
	Team	Pld	W	D	L	PF	PA	PD	Pts
1	Broughton Rangers	26	19	5	2	201	52	+149	43
2	Oldham	26	20	2	4	243	59	+184	42
3	Tyldesley	26	15	2	9	159	80	+79	32
4	Runcorn	26	13	5	8	134	62	+72	31
5	Stockport	26	14	2	10	157	137	+20	30
6	Swinton	26	12	5	9	125	82	+43	29
7	Warrington	26	11	5	10	100	124	-24	27
8	Leigh	26	11	4	11	105	147	-42	26
9	St. Helens	26	10	4	12	122	160	-38	24
10	Widnes	26	10	3	13	113	164	-51	23
11	Wigan	26	8	7	11	73	118	-45	23
12	Rochdale Hornets	26	8	1	17	121	167	-46	17
13	Salford	26	3	5	18	76	191	-115	11
14	Morecambe	26	3	0	23	52	238	-186	6

Champions

Source: R.L.Yearbook 1995-96 cited in "The Vault".
League points: for win = 2; for draw = 1; for loss = 0.
Pld = Games played; W = Wins; D = Draws; L = Losses; PF = Match points scored; PA = Match points conceded; PD = Points difference; Pts = League points.
