= 1900–01 St Helens R.F.C. season =

- 1900–01 Northern Rugby Football Union season Rank: 13th
- Challenge Cup: Third round
- 1900–01 record: Wins: 8; draws: 2; losses: 19
- Points scored: For: 82; against: 228
← 1899–1900	List of seasons	1901–02 →

The 1900–01 season was St Helens' sixth in the Northern Rugby Football Union, the 27th in their history. In their lowest ever finish in a rugby league competition, coming only a year after their most fruitful one, the club finished 13th in the Lancashire Senior Championship, having two points docked for breach of professional rules in the process. In the Challenge Cup, the club were knocked out in the third round by Batley.

== Lancashire Senior Championship ==
	Team	Pld	W	D	L	PF	PA	Pts
1	Oldham	26	22	1	3	301	67	45
2	Swinton	26	21	2	3	283	66	44
3	Runcorn	26	20	0	6	240	100	40
4	Broughton Rangers	26	17	2	7	211	84	36
5	Salford	26	15	0	11	229	149	30
6	Warrington	26	12	3	11	149	126	27
7	Leigh	26	12	2	12	157	143	26
8	Barrow	26	10	2	14	140	169	22
9	Wigan	26	8	3	15	98	227	19
10	Rochdale Hornets	26	8	2	16	103	257	18
11	Millom	26	8	0	18	85	194	16
12	Stockport	26	6	3	17	102	184	15
13	St. Helens	26	6	2	18	82	228	12*
14	Widnes	26	6	0	20	85	271	12

- St Helens had 2 points deducted for a breach of the professional rules.
