= 1907–08 St Helens R.F.C. season =

- 1907–08 Northern Rugby Football Union season Rank: 25th
- Challenge Cup: First round
- 1907–08 record: Wins: 7; draws: 3; losses: 23
- Points scored: For: 228; against: 500
← 1906–07	List of seasons	1908–09 →

The 1907–08 season was St Helens' thirteenth in the Northern Rugby Football Union, the 34th in their history. The club finished 25th out of 27 in the Championship, and bottom of the Lancashire League. In the Challenge Cup, the club were knocked out in the first round by Whitehaven.

== NRFU Championship ==
	Team	Pld	W	D	L	PF	PA	Pts	Pct
1	Oldham	32	28	2	2	396	121	58	90.62
2	Hunslet	32	25	1	6	389	248	51	79.68
3	Broughton Rangers	30	23	1	6	421	191	47	78.33
4	Wigan	32	23	1	8	501	181	47	73.43
5	Halifax	34	2	1	11	483	275	45	66.17
6	Hull Kingston Rovers	32	21	0	11	460	307	42	65.62
7	Warrington	30	18	3	9	431	156	39	65.00
8	Wakefield Trinity	32	20	1	11	422	322	41	64.06
9	Salford	32	19	3	10	344	187	41	64.06
10	Batley	32	20	0	12	360	306	40	62.05
11	Keighley	32	17	1	14	320	356	35	54.68
12	Bradford Northern	32	17	0	15	313	350	34	53.12
13	Runcorn	30	15	0	15	255	219	30	50.00
14	Barrow	32	15	0	17	244	272	30	46.87
15	Huddersfield	32	14	1	17	439	330	29	45.31
16	Hull	34	15	0	19	349	323	30	44.11
17	Rochdale Hornets	30	13	0	17	232	290	26	43.33
18	Dewsbury	32	13	1	18	290	358	27	42.18
19	Leigh	30	11	1	18	279	362	23	38.33
20	Leeds	32	10	1	21	270	397	21	32.81
21	Swinton	30	9	1	20	180	316	19	31.66
22	York	30	9	0	21	284	437	18	30.00
23	Merthyr Tydfil	30	8	1	21	229	400	17	28.33
24	Widnes	30	6	4	20	179	335	16	26.66
25	St. Helens	32	7	3	22	228	500	17	26.56
26	Ebbw Vale	30	6	2	22	153	426	14	23.33
27	Bramley	32	5	1	26	188	674	11	17.18
