= 1898–99 St Helens R.F.C. season =

- 1898–99 Northern Rugby Football Union season Rank: 8th
- Challenge Cup: Third round
- 1898–99 record: Wins: 14; draws: 3; losses: 12
- Points scored: For: 168; against: 180
← 1897–98	List of seasons	1899–1900 →

The 1898–99 season was St Helens' fourth in the Northern Rugby Football Union, the 25th in their history. The club finished 8th out of 14 in the Lancashire League. In the Challenge Cup, St Helens were beaten in the third round by Salford.

== Lancashire Senior Championship ==
	Team	Pld	W	D	L	PF	PA	Pts
1	Broughton Rangers	26	21	0	5	277	74	42
2	Oldham	26	20	0	6	385	58	40
3	Salford	26	18	2	6	206	113	38
4	Widnes	26	17	2	7	196	113	36
5	Leigh	26	17	0	9	168	125	34
6	Swinton	26	16	2	8	228	79	32*
7	Runcorn	26	15	2	9	193	113	32
8	St. Helens	26	12	3	11	168	18	27
9	Warrington	26	11	1	14	134	217	23
10	Rochdale Hornets	26	9	3	14	112	216	21
11	Stockport	26	5	1	20	102	317	11
12	Tyldesley	26	3	5	18	82	240	11
13	Wigan	26	4	2	20	66	238	10
14	Morecambe	26	2	1	23	47	281	5

- Swinton had 2 points deducted for a breach of the professional rules.
