= 1904–05 St Helens R.F.C. season =

- 1904–05 Northern Rugby Football Union season Rank: 12th
- Challenge Cup: Second round
- 1904–05 record: Wins: 10; draws: 1; losses: 25
- Points scored: For: 168; against: 351
← 1903–04	List of seasons	1905–06 →

The 1904–05 season was St Helens' tenth in the Northern Rugby Football Union, the 31st in the club's sporting history. A year after gaining promotion back to the first division, St Helens once again struggled, and finished second-bottom. St Helens also competed in the end-of-season South West Lancashire mini-league, but could only finish fourth out of six. In the Challenge Cup, St Helens were beaten in the second round by Broughton Red Rose.

== NRFU Division 1 ==
	Team	Pld	W	D	L	PF	PA	Pts
1	Oldham	34	25	1	8	291	158	51
2	Bradford	34	23	2	9	294	156	48
3	Broughton Rangers	34	22	2	10	295	175	46
4	Leeds	34	20	4	10	232	150	44
5	Warrington	34	20	2	12	220	150	42
6	Salford	34	19	2	13	276	204	40
7	Wigan	34	18	1	15	230	195	37
8	Hull	34	15	4	15	224	214	34
9	Hunslet	34	16	1	17	240	216	33
10	Halifax	34	15	2	17	204	155	32
11	Leigh	34	14	3	17	165	209	31
12	Hull Kingston Rovers	34	15	0	19	200	220	30
13	Swinton	34	13	2	19	155	196	28
14	Wakefield Trinity	34	13	2	19	154	211	28
15	Batley	34	12	3	19	160	228	27
16	Widnes	34	13	1	20	128	280	27
17	St. Helens	34	9	1	24	168	351	19
18	Runcorn	34	7	1	26	133	301	15
