= 1906–07 St Helens R.F.C. season =

- 1906–07 Northern Rugby Football Union season Rank: 2nd
- Challenge Cup: First round
- 1906–07 record: Wins: 9; draws: 0; losses: 18
- Points scored: For: 374; against: 353
← 1905–06	List of seasons	1907–08 →

The 1906–07 season was St Helens' twelfth in the Northern Rugby Football Union, the 33rd in their history. The club finished 22nd out of 27 in the Championship, whilst, in the South West Lancashire League, St Helens finished bottom. In the Challenge Cup, the club were knocked out in the first round by Swinton.

== NRFU Championship ==
	Team	Pld	W	D	L	PF	PA	Pts	Pct
1	Halifax	34	27	2	5	649	229	56	82.35
2	Oldham	34	26	1	7	457	227	53	77.94
3	Runcorn	30	23	0	7	546	216	46	76.66
4	Keighley	24	17	1	6	431	231	35	72.91
5	Wigan	34	23	1	10	656	278	47	69.11
6	Leeds	30	19	2	9	424	301	40	66.66
7	Hunslet	32	21	0	11	520	354	42	65.62
8	Warrington	34	21	1	12	554	304	43	63.23
9	Broughton Rangers	30	17	1	12	496	235	35	58.33
10	Salford	32	18	0	14	462	349	36	56.25
11	Barrow	26	13	1	12	333	356	27	51.92
12	Widnes	20	9	1	10	221	320	19	47.50
13	Hull Kingston Rovers	32	15	0	17	390	366	30	46.87
14	Dewsbury	28	12	1	15	393	377	25	44.64
15	Leigh	28	12	1	15	318	311	25	44.64
16	Wakefield Trinity	28	12	1	15	348	409	25	44.64
17	Swinton	32	14	0	18	308	380	28	43.75
18	Bradford	30	12	2	16	387	367	26	43.33
19	Huddersfield	32	13	0	19	469	477	26	40.62
20	Rochdale Hornets	26	9	1	16	292	312	19	36.53
21	Batley	24	8	1	15	228	326	17	35.41
22	St. Helens	26	9	0	17	374	353	18	34.61
23	Hull	32	11	0	21	337	515	22	34.37
24	York	24	5	0	19	217	514	10	20.83
25	Bramley	20	1	0	19	85	466	2	5.00
26	Liverpool City	30	0	0	30	76	1398	0	0.00
