= 1897–98 St Helens R.F.C. season =

- 1897–98 Northern Rugby Football Union season Rank: 8th
- Challenge Cup: First round
- 1897–98 record: Wins: 10; draws: 2; losses: 15
- Points scored: For: 161; against: 192
| ← 1896–97 | List of seasons | 1898–99 → |

The 1897–98 season was St Helens' third in the Northern Rugby Football Union, the 24th in their history. The club finished 8th out of 14 in an improved performance from the previous year in the Lancashire League. In the Challenge Cup, St Helens were knocked out in the first round by last years final opponents Batley.

== Lancashire Senior Championship ==
| | Team | Pld | W | D | L | PF | PA | PD | Pts |
|---|---|---|---|---|---|---|---|---|---|
| 1 | Oldham | 26 | 22 | 1 | 2 | 295 | 94 | +201 | 47 |
| 2 | Swinton | 26 | 20 | 3 | 3 | 321 | 83 | +238 | 43 |
| 3 | Widnes | 26 | 19 | 1 | 6 | 251 | 114 | +137 | 39 |
| 4 | Salford | 26 | 16 | 3 | 7 | 275 | 182 | +93 | 33 |
| 5 | Broughton Rangers | 26 | 13 | 4 | 9 | 183 | 108 | +75 | 30 |
| 6 | Wigan | 26 | 11 | 1 | 14 | 124 | 173 | -49 | 23 |
| 7 | Leigh | 26 | 11 | 2 | 13 | 176 | 170 | +6 | 22 |
| 8 | St. Helens | 26 | 10 | 2 | 14 | 161 | 192 | -31 | 22 |
| 9 | Warrington | 26 | 10 | 2 | 14 | 131 | 178 | -47 | 22 |
| 10 | Runcorn | 26 | 9 | 2 | 15 | 142 | 184 | -42 | 20 |
| 11 | Stockport | 26 | 8 | 2 | 16 | 154 | 253 | -99 | 18 |
| 12 | Tyldesley | 26 | 8 | 1 | 17 | 111 | 281 | -170 | 17 |
| 13 | Rochdale Hornets | 26 | 7 | 0 | 19 | 146 | 247 | -101 | 14 |
| 14 | Morecambe | 26 | 4 | 2 | 20 | 74 | 285 | -211 | 10 |

Champions

Source: R.L.Yearbook 1995-96 cited in "The Vault".
League points: for win = 2; for draw = 1; for loss = 0.
Pld = Games played; W = Wins; D = Draws; L = Losses; PF = Match points scored; PA = Match points conceded; PD = Points difference; Pts = League points.

Notes

a: Salford had 2 points deducted for fielding an ineligible player
b: Leigh had 2 points deducted for fielding an ineligible player
