= 1905–06 St Helens R.F.C. season =

- 1905–06 Northern Rugby Football Union season Rank: 14th
- Challenge Cup: Preliminary round
- 1905–06 record: Wins: 16; draws: 1; losses: 14
- Points scored: For: 244; against: 212
← 1904–05	List of seasons	1906–07 →

The 1905–06 season was St Helens' eleventh in the Northern Rugby Football Union, the 32nd in their history. After finishing 12th in Division 1 the season previous, St Helens were expected to take part in Division 2 from 1905. However, the two divisions became one 31-team Championship, saving the club from relegation. They finished in a fairly respectable 14th. In the South West Lancashire League, St Helens finished fifth in a six-team league. In the Challenge Cup, the club did not even make the first round proper, as they were defeated by Rochdale in the Preliminary Round.

== NRFU Championship ==
	Team	Pld	W	D	L	PF	PA	Pts	Pct
1	Leigh	30	23	2	5	245	130	48	80.00
2	Hunslet	32	25	0	7	370	148	50	78.12
3	Leeds	34	25	2	7	377	123	52	76.47
4	Oldham	40	28	2	10	446	125	58	72.50
5	Keighley	28	19	1	8	255	164	39	69.64
6	Wigan	34	22	1	11	441	167	45	66.17
7	Hull Kingston Rovers	36	22	3	11	246	218	47	65.27
8	Broughton Rangers	34	21	1	12	400	222	43	63.23
9	Halifax	38	20	8	10	261	232	48	63.15
10	Runcorn	30	17	3	10	264	136	37	61.66
11	Huddersfield	30	17	2	11	224	174	36	60.00
12	Bradford	34	19	2	13	371	199	40	58.82
13	Swinton	32	17	3	12	203	168	37	57.81
14	St. Helens	30	16	1	13	244	212	33	55.00
15	Warrington	38	19	3	16	270	184	41	53.94
16	Wakefield Trinity	32	13	4	15	188	262	30	46.87
17	Hull	36	16	1	19	304	220	33	45.83
18	Salford	34	14	3	17	272	270	31	45.58
19	Pontefract	28	11	1	16	211	196	23	41.07
20	Batley	34	11	5	18	173	215	27	39.70
21	Widnes	28	10	2	16	129	242	22	39.28
22	Dewsbury	36	13	2	21	162	252	28	38.88
23	Bramley	26	9	2	15	126	246	20	38.46
24	York	34	11	2	21	170	249	24	35.29
25	Barrow	32	9	4	19	138	324	22	34.37
26	Normanton	24	4	2	18	50	280	10	20.83
27	Millom	20	3	2	15	77	328	8	20.00
28	Castleford	20	3	2	15	45	325	8	20.00
29	Rochdale Hornets	32	3	6	23	105	327	12	18.75
30	Morecambe	26	2	4	20	99	282	8	15.38
31	Brighouse Rangers	26	3	2	21	87	333	8	15.38
