= 1899–1900 St Helens R.F.C. season =

- 1898–99 Northern Rugby Football Union season Rank: 4th
- Challenge Cup: First round
- 1899–1900 record: Wins: 16; draws: 3; losses: 8
- Points scored: For: 207; against: 119
← 1897–98	List of seasons	1900–01 →

The 1899–1900 season was St Helens' fifth in the Northern Rugby Football Union, the 26th in their history. In their highest ever finish in a rugby league competition, and their most successful season, the club finished fourth in the Lancashire Senior Championship. In the Challenge Cup, St Helens were beaten in the first round by rivals Warrington. However, they did manage some silverware in the season, by beating league winners Runcorn 6-0 in the South Lancashire Cup final.

== Lancashire Senior Championship ==
	Team	Pld	W	D	L	PF	PA	Pts
1	Runcorn	26	22	2	2	232	33	46
2	Oldham	26	21	1	4	340	75	43
3	Swinton	26	19	1	6	210	108	39
4	St. Helens	26	16	3	7	207	119	35
5	Widnes	26	12	4	10	174	146	28
6	Warrington	26	12	1	13	174	128	25
7	Broughton Rangers	26	13	1	12	132	138	25*
8	Salford	26	12	0	14	196	176	24
9	Stockport	26	10	2	14	126	136	22
10	Leigh	26	8	5	13	119	211	21
11	Rochdale Hornets	26	9	1	16	90	181	17*
12	Millom	26	7	1	18	112	234	15
13	Wigan	26	7	1	18	73	230	15
14	Tyldesley	26	2	1	23	66	336	5
