= 1895–96 St Helens R.F.C. season =

- 1895–96 Northern Rugby Football Union season Rank: 8th
- 1895–96 record: Wins: 15; draws: 8; losses: 19
- Points scored: For: 195; against: 230
List of seasons	1896–97 →

The 1895–96 season was St Helens' first in the Northern Rugby Football Union, following the dispute and split with the Rugby Football Union. In a difficult season, the club finished fourteenth out of 22 teams in the national competition, having two points deducted from their league total for fielding an ineligible player, and seventh in the concurrent Lancashire Senior Championship.

== National Championship ==
	Team	Pld	W	D	L	PF	PA	PD	Pts
1	Manningham	42	33	0	9	367	158	+209	66
2	Halifax	42	30	5	7	312	139	+173	65
3	Runcorn	42	24	8	10	314	143	+171	56
4	Oldham	42	27	2	13	374	194	+180	56
5	Brighouse	42	22	9	11	247	129	+118	53
6	Tyldesley	42	21	8	13	260	164	+96	50
7	Hunslet	42	24	2	16	279	207	+72	50
8	Hull F.C.	42	23	3	16	259	158	+101	49
9	Leigh	42	21	4	17	214	269	-55	46
10	Wigan	42	19	7	16	245	147	+98	45
11	Bradford	42	18	9	15	254	175	+79	45
12	Leeds	42	20	3	19	258	247	+11	43
13	Warrington	42	17	5	20	198	240	-42	39
14	St. Helens	42	15	8	19	195	230	-35	36
15	Liversedge	42	15	4	23	261	355	-94	34
16	Widnes	42	14	4	24	177	323	-146	32
17	Stockport	42	12	8	22	171	315	-144	32
18	Batley	42	12	7	23	137	298	-161	31
19	Wakefield Trinity	42	13	4	25	156	318	-162	30
20	Huddersfield	42	10	4	28	194	274	-80	24
21	Broughton	42	8	8	26	165	244	-79	24
22	Rochdale Hornets	42	4	8	30	78	388	-310	16

Champions

League points: for win = 2; for draw = 1; for loss = 0.
Pld = Games played; W = Wins; D = Draws; L = Losses; PF = Match points scored; PA = Match points conceded; PD = Points difference; Pts = League points.

Notes

a: St. Helens had 2 points deducted for fielding an ineligible player
