= 1901–02 St Helens R.F.C. season =

- 1901–02 Northern Rugby Football Union season Rank: 4th
- Challenge Cup: First round
- 1901–02 record: Wins: 16; draws: 3; losses: 8
- Points scored: For: 207; against: 119
← 1900–01	List of seasons	1902–03 →

The 1901–02 season was St Helens' seventh as members of the Northern Rugby Football Union, and the 28th in their history. This season, the two county leagues, Yorkshire and Lancashire, were merged to form the Northern Rugby League. As St Helens failed to make the qualification criteria due to last season's disappointing finish, they competed in the Lancashire Senior Championship, in which they finished third, and a new-found concurrent South West Lancashire mini-league, in which they finished bottom. In the Challenge Cup, St Helens were beaten in the first round by Hull Kingston Rovers.

== Lancashire Senior Championship ==
	Team	Pld	W	D	L	PF	PA	Pts
1	Wigan	24	21	0	3	288	66	42
2	Widnes	24	20	0	4	254	67	40
3	St Helens	24	16	1	7	208	114	33
4	Barrow	24	15	1	8	218	192	31
5	Hull Kingston Rovers	24	14	4	6	274	79	30*
6	Stockport	24	13	3	8	151	106	27*
7	Millom	24	11	2	11	209	124	24
8	Rochdale Hornets	24	11	2	11	163	98	24
9	Birkenhead	24	8	3	13	127	178	19
10	Lancaster	24	8	1	15	144	152	17
11	Morecambe	24	5	1	18	103	181	11
12	Altrincham	24	2	1	21	20	428	3*
13	Radcliffe	24	2	1	21	58	534	3*

- Hull Kingston Rovers, Stockport, Altrincham and Radcliffe each had 2 points deducted for a breach of the professional rules.
