= List of Leigh Leopards players =

The Leigh Leopards (known as just Leigh until the completion of the 1994–95 Rugby Football League season and Leigh Centurions from 1995 to 2022) are an English rugby league club. Leigh began Rugby Football Union competition in 1878, and in 1895 became a founding member of the Rugby Football League (originally the Northern Rugby Football Union) that broke away from the Rugby Football Union.

From that first 1895 season under rugby league rules, through to the end of competition in the 2018 RFL Championship season, Leigh has had 1,469 players, excluding non-playing substitutes, take the field during a competitive first-class match. This includes matches that were subsequently abandoned, expunged or re-played, but excludes friendlies.

These Leigh rugby league players have been allocated a sequential heritage number, in order of their appearance, by the Leigh Leopards.

== List ==
In the following table:

- The individual columns may not reflect the exact type of scoring, due to rule changes over the years, though "Total Points" is correct:
  - The table does account for the points associated with kicking-related scoring (goals), during the first two seasons (1895–96, 1896–97) of Northern Rugby Football Union's existence, when conversions were worth 2-points, penalty goals 3-points and drop goals 4-points.
  - From 1897–98 to 1972-73, all goals earned 2-points, so drop-goals were not always tracked separately from other goals for the purposes of "Drop Goals" column on this list.
- While the "Début" and "Last Match" dates are accurate, and reflect a player's first and last time with Leigh, a player may have played with another high-level rugby league team before, during or after the period of those two dates.
- Available (incomplete) information is shown indicating players selected to play on national, international (Other Nationalities, British Empire XIII) or regional teams.

№	Player	Début	Last match	Appearances	Tries	Goals	Drop goals	Points	Competed with a national or regional team
915	Neil Abbott	1982–83	1982–83	2	0	0	0	0	
1122	Paul Abercrombie	1997	1997	1	0	0	0	0	
550	Alan Ackers	1946–47	1949–50	36	0	59	0	118	
1389	Jamie Acton	2014	2018	96	17	0	0	68	
1324	Andy Ainscough	2009	2010	4	0	0	0	0	
1283	Martin Ainscough	2007	2007	18	10	0	0	40	
903	Gary Ainsworth	1981–82	1985–86	63	16	0	0	61	
236	James Ainsworth	1913–14	1920–21	35	6	0	0	18	
1030	Basil Ake	1991–92	1991–92	8	4	0	0	16	
561	Frank Alder	1947–48	1949–50	54	5	0	0	15	
462	Percy Aldred	1938–39	1948–49	51	12	1	0	38	
925	Adrian Alexander	1983–84	1983–84	13	3	0	0	12	
605	Trevor Allan	1950–51	1953–54	97	52	0	0	156	Other Nationalities, British Empire XIII
1201	David Alstead	2003	2010	114	63	0	0	252	
896	Peter Alstead	1980–81	1980–81	2	0	0	0	0	
354	Walter Alty	1930–31	1930–31	1	0	0	0	0	
885	Mark Anderson	1978–79	1978–79	1	0	0	0	0	
1160	Paul Anderson	1999	2002	103	50	17	0	234	
352	Arthur Anderton	1930–31	1931–32	18	6	0	0	18	
3	Tom Anderton	1895–96	1899–1900	134	18	1	0	56	Lancashire
1189	Eric Andrews	2002	2003	23	12	0	0	48	
404	Robert Archer	1935–36	1935–36	3	1	0	0	3	
1144	James Arkwright	1998	2000	53	14	0	0	56	
1317	Dave Armitstead	2009	2010	48	7	0	0	28	
215	Jack Armstrong	1912–13	1925–26	177	15	0	0	45	
1340	Tom Armstrong	2011	2016	92	53	0	0	212	
26	Tom Arrowsmith	1895–96	1904–05	93	4	0	0	12	
353	Jim Ashcroft	1930–31	1930–31	1	0	0	0	0	
752	Kevin Ashcroft	1966–67	1976–77	261	25	12	6	105	Great Britain
736	Peter Ashcroft	1965–66	1967–68	9	3	0	0	9	
504	Albert Ashton	1940–41	1940–41	2	0	0	0	0	
271	Fred Ashton	1920–21	1923–24	5	0	0	0	0	
174	Walter Ashton	1907–08	1908–09	32	3	0	0	9	
161	Jim Ashurst	1906–07	1906–07	2	1	0	0	3	
899	Geoffrey Aspinall	1980–81	1981–82	12	1	0	0	3	
1068	Scott Aspinall	1993–94	1997	7	0	2	0	4	
1372	Martin Aspinwall	2013	2015	36	3	0	0	12	
1285	Matt Astley	2007	2007	9	0	0	0	0	
657	Bill Atherton	1955–56	1958–59	60	14	0	0	42	
919	Wayne Atherton	1983–84	1987–88	64	10	37	0	114	
805	John Atkin	1972–73	1972–73	17	4	0	0	12	
206	Dick Atkinson	1910–11	1912–13	24	5	0	0	15	
17	G. B. Atkinson	1895–96	1895–96	1	0	0	0	0	
168	W. Atkinson	1906–07	1906–07	1	0	0	0	0	
176	Andrew Attewell	1907–08	1908–09	8	5	0	0	15	
547	Wally Ayres	1946–47	1946–47	1	0	0	0	0	
247	John Bacon	1919–20	1919–20	11	1	0	0	3	
243	Jonty Bailey	1918–19	1924–25	17	1	0	0	3	
1450	Ricky Bailey	2018	2018	18	12	0	0	48	
1453	Ryan Bailey	2018	2018	11	1	0	0	4	
428	John Baird	1936–37	1936–37	2	0	0	0	0	
865	Gordon Baker	1976–77	1976–77	7	1	0	0	3	
761	Alan Baldwin	1967–68	1967–68	1	0	0	0	0	
1047	Simon Baldwin	1992–93	2002	145	44	14	0	204	
287	Stan Baldwin	1924–25	1927–28	71	34	1	0	104	
1454	Jordan Baldwinson	2018	2018	6	0	0	0	0	
1088	Rob Ball	1994–95	2003	93	11	0	0	44	
1270	Paul Ballard	2006	2006	4	1	0	0	4	
440	Charlie Banfield	1937–38	1939–40	45	2	21	0	48	
1077	Shaun Bannister	1994–95	1997	63	14	0	0	56	
1076	John Bannon	1994–95	1994–95	1	0	0	0	0	
1447	Kurt Baptiste	2018	2018	1	0	0	0	0	
1387	Sam Barlow	2014	2015	51	9	0	0	36	
476	Stan Barlow	1939–40	1939–40	1	0	0	0	0	
523	… Barr	1940–41	1940–41	2	0	0	0	0	
120	Daniel Barr	1902–03	1902–03	3	2	0	0	6	
467	Tommy Barr	1938–39	1938–39	10	1	0	0	3	
1465	James Barran	2018	2018	1	0	0	0	0	
114	Billy Barrett	1901–02	1901–02	1	0	0	0	0	
1034	David Barrett	1991–92	1991–92	2	0	0	0	0	
784	Billy Barrow	1970–71	1974–75	32	2	0	0	6	
800	Frank Barrow	1972–73	1974–75	64	4	0	0	12	
781	Tony Barrow	1970–71	1972–73	106	24	0	0	72	
202	Dick Barton	1910–11	1913–14	76	4	0	0	12	
646	John Barton	1954–55	1956–57	34	13	0	0	39	
1376	Anthony Bate	2013	2014	20	3	0	0	12	
178	Robert Bate	1908–09	1909–10	16	3	0	0	9	
189	Frank Battersby	1909–10	1909–10	27	2	22	0	50	
162	Jim Battersby	1906–07	1906–07	2	0	0	0	0	
325	Bill Baxter	1928–29	1937–38	104	7	42	0	105	
61	Jesse Baxter	1897–98	1897–98	2	0	0	0	0	
559	Ken Baxter	1946–47	1956–57	201	48	0	0	144	
916	Paul Baxter	1982–83	1982–83	1	0	0	0	0	
999	Bob Beardmore	1989–90	1990–91	42	16	20	0	104	
274	Tom Beardmore	1921–22	1921–22	1	0	0	0	0	
604	George Beatty	1950–51	1952–53	27	3	0	0	9	
917	Darren Beazant	1982–83	1985–86	26	6	0	0	24	
490	Ted Beesley	1939–40	1940–41	7	0	0	0	0	
378	"Tom"/"Tommy" Beetham	1933–34	1933–34	1	0	0	0	0	
127	Billy Bell	1902–03	1902–03	3	0	0	0	0	
126	Arthur Bennett	1902–03	1902–03	1	0	0	0	0	
112	Herbert Bennett	1901–02	1910–11	206	45	2	0	139	
510	Tom Bennett	1940–41	1940–41	5	0	0	0	0	
609	Basil Benson	1950–51	1951–52	14	3	0	0	9	
1149	Peers Bent	1998	1998	10	0	0	0	0	
965	Keith Bentley	1986–87	1986–87	4	1	0	0	4	
1445	Ilias Bergal	2018	2018	11	13	0	0	52	
52	Billy Berry	1897–98	1897–98	7	0	0	0	0	
140	Bob Berry	1903–04	1906–07	96	2	0	0	6	
1353	Bob Beswick	2012	2015	123	18	0	1	73	Ireland
620	Owen Bevan	1951–52	1951–52	16	8	0	0	24	
787	Mick Bibby	1971–72	1971–72	2	0	0	0	0	
1264	Adam Bibey	2006	2006	1	0	0	0	0	
1211	Ricky Bibey	2003	2012	71	5	0	0	20	
840	Terry Bilsbury	1974–75	1983–84	150	63	0	1	190	Lancashire
672	Ken Birchall	1957–58	1959–60	3	0	0	0	0	
681	Arnold Bishop	1958–59	1964–65	19	0	1	0	2	
922	Neil Bishop	1983–84	1983–84	1	0	0	0	0	
309	Tommy Bithell	1926–27	1932–33	120	26	5	0	88	Lancashire
250	Albert Blackburn	1919–20	1930–31	116	31	2	0	97	
386	George Blackburn	1933–34	1935–36	57	3	0	0	9	
41	Henry Blackburn	1896–97	1896–97	5	0	0	0	0	
128	Jack Blackburn	1902–03	1907–08	103	1	0	0	3	
1128	Paul Blackburn	1997	1997	10	1	0	0	4	
1196	Anthony Blackwood	2002	2003	6	3	0	0	12	
1455	Jack Blagbrough	2018	2018	13	0	0	0	0	
1015	Mike Blakeley	1990–91	1996	33	10	72	2	186	
461	Tommy Blakeley	1938–39	1940–41	26	7	1	0	23	
482	Bob Blaze	1939–40	1939–40	1	0	0	0	0	
1333	Matty Blythe	2010	2011	21	12	0	0	48	
73	Albert Boardman	1898–99	1899–1900	3	0	0	0	0	
226	Ernie Boardman	1912–13	1924–25	223	48	0	0	144	
10	George Boardman	1895–96	1904–05	282	9	1	0	29	Lancashire
1288	John Boland	2007	2007	1	0	0	0	0	
188	Mick Bolewski	1909–10	1911–12	100	3	18	0	45	Lancashire
745	John Bolton	1966–67	1966–67	5	1	0	0	3	
390	Arthur Bond	1934–35	1934–35	14	1	0	0	3	
695	Ken Boonzaier	1960–61	1961–62	28	5	2	0	19	
191	Arthur Booth	1909–10	1914–15	21	5	0	0	15	
710	Bramwell Booth	1962–63	1962–63	2	0	0	0	0	
1078	John Booth	1994–95	1994–95	9	0	0	0	0	
1012	Simon Booth	1990–91	1993–94	67	17	0	0	68	
696	Piet Botha	1960–61	1961–62	33	0	98	0	196	
1248	Matthew Bottom	2005	2006	3	0	0	0	0	
909	Mark Bourneville	1982–83	1982–83	7	2	0	0	6	
32	Dicky Bowden	1895–96	1895–96	3	0	0	0	0	
576	Jackie Bowen	1948–49	1948–49	30	7	0	0	21	
633	John Bowker	1953–54	1953–54	3	0	0	0	0	
1138	Radney Bowker	1998	2004	64	21	0	0	84	
881	Edward "Eddie" Bowman	1978–79	1980–81	36	0	0	0	0	
812	Denis Boyd	1973–74	1983–84	130	26	0	0	78	Lancashire
552	Eric Boydell	1946–47	1946–47	17	4	1	0	14	
786	Jimmy Boylan	1971–72	1973–74	51	4	0	0	12	
1176	David Bradbury	2001	2004	102	21	0	0	84	
474	Joe Bradbury	1939–40	1939–40	8	1	0	0	3	
1276	John Braddish	2007	2007	1	0	0	0	0	
622	Tommy Bradshaw	1951–52	1954–55	68	1	0	0	3	
146	Phil Brady	1904–05	1905–06	7	0	0	0	0	
264	Cyril Braund	1920–21	1924–25	59	10	0	0	30	
471	Dick Breare	1939–40	1952–53	69	4	86	0	184	
413	Percy Breckell	1935–36	1936–37	9	2	0	0	6	
857	Steve Breheny	1975–76	1976–77	16	0	0	0	0	
1170	Liam Bretherton	2000	2002	52	23	19	1	131	
1011	Russ Bridge	1990–91	1994–95	62	7	0	0	28	
691	David Bridgewater	1960–61	1963–64	13	2	0	0	6	
1354	Ryan Brierley	2012	present (as of 2019)	125	133	38	4	612	
733	Wilf Briggs	1965–66	1976–77	112	54	11	1	185	
662	Jim Bright	1956–57	1957–58	29	6	0	0	18	
1337	Craig Briscoe	2010	2013	52	8	0	0	32	
477	Tommy Briscoe	1939–40	1939–40	4	1	0	0	3	
1164	Adam Bristow	2000	2003	141	53	0	0	212	
282	Billy Britton	1922–23	1924–25	12	0	2	0	4	
949	Simon Brockwell	1985–86	1985–86	11	4	0	0	16	
678	Brian Brooks	1958–59	1966–67	78	12	0	0	36	
833	Duncan Broome	1973–74	1973–74	1	0	0	0	0	
687	Ted Brophy	1959–60	1962–63	70	1	0	0	3	
1385	Alex Brown	2014	2014	2	0	0	0	0	
198	Charlie Brown	1910–11	1911–12	22	2	0	0	6	
880	Dave Brown	1978–79	1979–80	30	8	0	0	24	
751	Dennis Brown	1966–67	1973–74	35	0	16	0	32	
498	Jim Brown	1939–40	1939–40	1	0	0	0	0	
1463	Kevin Brown	2018	2018	1	0	0	0	0	
1418	Mitch Brown	2016	2016	33	12	0	0	48	
1004	Peter Brown	1989–90	1990–91	35	4	3	0	22	
621	Ron Brown	1951–52	1955–56	5	0	0	0	0	
1095	Shaun Brown	1995–96	1997	21	0	0	4	4	
153	Jim Buckley	1904–05	1905–06	3	0	0	0	0	
485	Jim Buckley	1939–40	1940–41	7	0	0	0	0	
459	John Buckley	1938–39	1939–40	23	2	0	0	6	
1382	Joe Bullock	2013	2013	7	0	0	0	0	
886	Dave Bullough	1978–79	1980–81	30	2	0	0	6	
134	Arthur Burgess	1903–04	1906–07	66	9	8	0	43	
1100	Barry Burgess	1995–96	1998	32	20	0	0	80	
567	Ron Burgess	1947–48	1947–48	3	0	0	0	0	
1368	Greg Burke	2012	2013	4	0	0	0	0	
593	Jeff Burke	1949–50	1952–53	74	7	4	0	29	
938	Paul Burke	1984–85	1987–88	8	0	0	0	0	
1038	Tony Burke	1992–93	1993–94	7	0	0	0	0	
1414	Travis Burns	2016	2016	8	3	4	0	20	
1427	Lachlan Burr	2017	2017	28	3	0	0	12	
975	Craig Burrill	1987–88	1990–91	37	16	9	0	82	
713	Bill Burrows	1962–63	1962–63	2	0	0	0	0	
1130	Mark Burrows	1997	1999	12	2	0	0	8	
165	Charlie Butler	1906–07	1906–07	3	1	0	0	3	
487	Jackie Butler	1939–40	1939–40	5	0	0	0	0	
926	John Butler	1983–84	1983–84	3	0	0	0	0	
1280	Sam Butterworth	2007	2007	21	3	0	0	12	
1467	Liam Byrne	2018	2018	1	0	0	0	0	
820	Tony Byrne	1973–74	1974–75	23	2	0	0	6	
422	Walter Byrne	1936–37	1936–37	5	1	0	0	3	
819	Jim Cadman	1973–74	1973–74	1	0	0	0	0	
1107	Alex Cain	1995–96	1996	25	1	0	0	4	
211	Tom Cain	1911–12	1918–19	76	11	1	0	35	
81	Prosper Caldicott	1899–1900	1899–1900	17	9	0	0	27	
668	Brian Callaghan	1957–58	1962–63	42	11	0	0	33	
670	Eric Callaghan	1957–58	1959–60	16	1	0	0	3	
1222	Mike Callan	2004	2004	6	2	0	0	8	
951	Danny Campbell	1985–86	1985–86	10	1	0	0	4	
777	Tommy Canning	1969–70	1972–73	78	13	1	0	41	
829	Dennis Carden	1973–74	1975–76	21	1	2	0	7	
1199	Dale Cardoza	2002	2004	34	32	0	0	128	
801	Dave Carey	1972–73	1974–75	14	0	0	0	0	
799	John Carey	1972–73	1972–73	5	0	0	0	0	
731	John Carney	1965–66	1966–67	8	1	0	0	3	
75	William Carrington	1898–99	1898–99	1	0	0	0	0	
237	Syd Carter	1913–14	1914–15	25	6	0	0	18	
682	Brian Cartwright	1958–59	1959–60	15	4	0	0	12	
209	Joe Cartwright	1911–12	1926–27	348	7	0	0	21	Great Britain
207	Peter Cartwright	1910–11	1914–15	12	0	0	0	0	
1000	Brian Case	1989–90	1990–91	43	2	0	0	8	
512	… Cashan	1940–41	1940–41	3	0	0	0	0	
838	Paul Cass	1974–75	1974–75	3	0	0	0	0	
1167	James Cassidy	2000	2000	2	0	0	0	0	
48	Ernest Castle	1896–97	1898–99	14	0	0	0	0	
581	Frank Castle	1948–49	1948–49	1	0	0	0	0	
1325	Mark Castle	2009	2009	4	0	0	0	0	
549	Jack Catterall	1946–47	1947–48	8	0	0	0	0	
113	Tom Causer	1901–02	1902–03	23	4	0	0	12	
1166	Chris Causey	2000	2000	12	0	0	0	0	
1057	Steve Cawley	1993–94	1994–95	32	4	0	0	16	
539	Jack Cayzer	1946–47	1947–48	67	11	0	0	33	
618	Brian Chadwick	1951–52	1961–62	218	48	0	0	144	
1409	Lewis Charnock	2016	2016	2	1	0	0	4	
1400	Rangi Chase	2016	2016	5	2	0	0	8	
1064	Andy Cheetham	1993–94	1996	47	25	0	0	100	
9	J. "Catty" Cheetham	1895–96	1897–98	90	0	0	0	0	
446	Tommy Cheetham	1938–39	1940–41	48	7	0	0	21	
756	Dave Chisnall	1967–68	1976–77	166	28	0	0	84	Great Britain
905	Eric Chisnall	1981–82	1982–83	27	2	0	0	6	
774	Les Chisnall	1969–70	1971–72	49	9	0	0	27	
591	Albert Christy	1949–50	1949–50	1	0	0	0	0	
500	Jim Churm	1940–41	1940–41	4	0	3	0	6	
104	Ellis Clare	1900–01	1904–05	117	1	0	0	3	
1434	James Clare	2017	2017	5	6	0	0	24	
898	Bob Clarke	1980–81	1980–81	5	0	0	0	0	
883	Colin Clarke	1978–79	1979–80	3	0	0	0	0	
808	Derek Clarke	1972–73	1973–74	51	4	0	0	12	
664	Doug Clarke	1956–57	1961–62	21	2	0	0	6	
227	Ernie Clarke	1912–13	1919–20	48	2	1	0	8	
923	Jeff Clarke	1983–84	1987–88	96	13	0	0	52	
726	Keith Clarke	1964–65	1976–77	104	7	0	0	21	
1050	Troy Clarke	1992–93	1993–94	21	7	30	0	88	
245	Billy Clarkson	1919–20	1919–20	1	0	0	0	0	
577	Des Clarkson	1948–49	1948–49	7	2	17	0	40	
155	Ellis Clarkson	1904–05	1918–19	214	10	52	0	134	Lancashire
779	Geoffrey Clarkson	1970–71	1983–84	107	9	0	0	27	
244	Thomas "Tom"/"Tommy" Clarkson	1919–20	1932–33	369	17	315	0	681	England
1361	Adam Clay	2012	2012	5	3	0	0	12	
665	Albert Clayton	1956–57	1957–58	2	0	0	0	0	
570	Albert "Nebby" Cleworth	1947–48	1950–51	56	17	0	0	51	
1162	Graeme Close	1999	2000	10	0	10	0	20	
626	Harold Clough	1952–53	1953–54	40	8	0	0	24	
1278	John Clough	2007	2007	16	2	0	0	8	
298	John Coates	1925–26	1925–26	7	1	0	0	3	
1220	Mick Coates	2004	2004	3	0	0	0	0	
543	Ben Coffey	1946–47	1953–54	102	3	0	0	9	Lancashire
221	Fred Coffey	1912–13	1921–22	84	5	0	0	15	
947	Trevor Cogger	1985–86	1985–86	27	10	0	0	40	
59	Jim Coleman	1897–98	1898–99	40	3	3	0	15	
1250	Liam Coleman	2005	2006	11	0	0	0	0	
60	Tom Coleman	1897–98	1899–1900	45	6	0	0	18	
1026	Andrew Collier	1991–92	1992–93	20	2	0	0	8	
955	Andy Collier	1985–86	1993–94	198	30	0	0	120	
223	Bob Collier	1912–13	1912–13	3	0	0	0	0	
395	Chris Collier	1934–35	1939–40	107	12	0	0	36	
83	John Henry "Harry" Collins	1899–1900	1901–02	24	0	0	0	0	
720	Mick Collins	1963–64	1974–75	408	82	0	0	246	Great Britain (Under-24s)
273	Dan Connolly	1921–22	1925–26	23	4	0	0	12	
1112	Dean Conway	1996	2000	20	0	0	0	0	
888	Tony Cooke	1979–80	1981–82	98	12	0	0	36	
1259	John Cookson	2006	2009	39	5	0	0	20	
1	Thomas Coop	1895–96	1897–98	85	0	40	0	104	
47	Arthur Cooper	1896–97	1896–97	7	1	0	0	3	
1225	Ben Cooper	2004	2005	41	12	0	0	48	
985	Mark Cooper	1987–88	1988–89	12	0	0	0	0	
856	John Corcoran	1975–76	1975–76	3	1	0	0	3	
1028	John Costello	1991–92	1999	148	17	0	0	68	
20	James Cottam	1895–96	1895–96	3	0	0	0	0	
1079	Lee Cottom	1994–95	1994–95	5	2	0	0	8	
743	Dave Cotton	1966–67	1966–67	6	1	0	0	3	
927	Tony Cottrell	1983–84	1991–92	209	22	0	0	88	Lancashire
1274	Damien Couturier	2007	2007	16	9	61	0	158	
1459	Mitch Cox	2018	present (as of 2019)	6	1	0	0	4	
1375	Thomas Coyle	2013	2013	2	0	0	0	0	
361	Harry Critchley	1931–32	1936–37	89	13	0	0	39	
280	Jack Critchley	1922–23	1922–23	2	0	0	0	0	
296	Fred Crook	1925–26	1929–30	74	10	0	0	30	
631	John Crook	1952–53	1959–60	67	7	0	0	21	
1420	Ben Crooks	2017	2018	48	22	0	0	88	
1381	Dom Crosby	2013	2013	1	0	0	0	0	
1163	Alan Cross	2000	2001	35	20	0	0	80	
369	Norman Crossland	1932–33	1932–33	2	0	0	0	0	
1152	Heath Cruckshank	1999	2004	81	12	0	0	48	
1018	David Cruickshank	1990–91	1990–91	11	2	0	0	8	
1308	Dale Cunniffe	2008	2010	4	2	0	0	8	
1448	Jonah Cunningham	2018	2018	2	0	0	0	0	
341	Jim Curren	1929–30	1929–30	1	0	0	0	0	
201	Tom Cushion	1910–11	1910–11	1	0	0	0	0	
1457	Will Dagger	2018	2018	4	1	0	0	4	
571	Harry Dagnan	1947–48	1948–49	37	20	0	0	60	
1033	Mark Dainty	1991–92	1992–93	21	3	0	0	12	
879	Arthur Daley	1978–79	1980–81	85	6	0	1	19	
536	Frank Daley	1946–47	1948–49	93	19	0	0	57	
1058	Paul Daniel	1993–94	1997	92	24	0	0	96	
667	Norman Darbyshire	1957–58	1958–59	8	5	9	0	33	
220	Joe Darwell	1912–13	1928–29	297	30	11	0	112	Great Britain
186	Dai Davies	1908–09	1922–23	259	23	0	0	69	
228	Dai Davies	1913–14	1913–14	5	0	0	0	0	Wales, Lancashire (& Wales football)
1059	Glynn Davies	1993–94	1997	45	19	14	0	104	
652	Gwyn Davies	1955–56	1961–62	45	14	0	0	42	
342	Harry "Cocky" Davies	1929–30	1937–38	137	12	0	0	36	
562	Jim Davies	1947–48	1949–50	58	1	0	0	3	
810	John Davies	1972–73	1976–77	115	47	0	0	141	Lancashire
412	Lloyd Davies	1935–36	1937–38	10	1	0	0	3	
627	Malcolm Davies	1952–53	1955–56	84	79	0	0	237	
635	Peter Davies	1953–54	1955–56	48	5	23	0	61	
277	Stan Davies	1921–22	1921–22	1	0	0	0	0	
941	Steve Davies	1984–85	1984–85	7	2	0	0	8	
15	Ted Davies	1895–96	1898–99	40	7	0	0	21	
66	Tom Davies	1898–99	1902–03	140	31	10	0	113	
825	Tommy Davies	1973–74	1974–75	40	14	4	0	50	
741	Tony Davies	1966–67	1966–67	27	0	0	0	0	
954	Michael Davis	1985–86	1986–87	44	15	0	0	60	
1416	Matty Dawson-Jones	2016	2018	67	42	0	0	168	
613	Derek Day	1951–52	1952–53	5	4	0	0	12	
1151	Craig Dean	1999	2000	23	8	9	0	50	
960	Mike Dean	1986–87	1990–91	109	20	0	0	80	
102	Sam Devereux	1900–01	1901–02	5	0	0	0	0	
1452	Jordan Dezaria	2018	2018	12	0	0	0	0	
638	Martin Dickens	1953–54	1959–60	87	14	0	0	42	
725	Tommy Dickens	1964–65	1969–70	43	2	0	0	6	
674	John "Todder" Dickinson	1957–58	1958–59	28	7	0	0	21	
1150	Stuart Dickinson	1998	1998	5	2	0	0	8	
1396	Andrew Dixon	2015	2016	38	9	0	0	36	
306	Hugh Dixon	1925–26	1925–26	1	0	0	0	0	
1007	Paul Doherty	1989–90	1989–90	1	0	0	0	0	
1327	Dean Dollin	2009	2009	1	0	0	0	0	
877	Steve Donlan	1978–79	1984–85	240	81	21	28	337	Great Britain
1117	Stuart Donlan	1997	2011	194	79	0	0	316	
506	… Donnelly	1940–41	1940–41	1	0	0	0	0	
358	Bill Donoghue	1931–32	1931–32	1	0	0	0	0	
208	James Donohue	1911–12	1913–14	48	10	24	0	78	
996	Jason Donohue	1988–89	1998	92	26	8	1	121	
817	John Dorahy	1973–74	1973–74	5	1	0	0	3	
821	Tony Dorahy	1973–74	1973–74	1	0	0	0	0	
1299	Lee Doran	2008	2008	27	10	0	0	40	
772	Stan Dorrington	1969–70	1973–74	65	9	0	0	27	
979	Tony Dowling	1987–88	1987–88	1	0	0	0	0	
348	Harry Downes	1930–31	1931–32	20	2	5	0	16	
868	John Downs	1976–77	1976–77	1	0	0	0	0	
291	John Draper	1924–25	1926–27	15	2	0	0	6	
1413	Josh Drinkwater	2016	2017	43	12	29	2	108	
1139	Steve Driscoll	1998	1998	6	0	0	0	0	
836	Alva Drummond	1973–74	1975–76	11	5	0	0	15	Great Britain
862	Des Drummond	1976–77	1985–86	280	141	2	0	470	
1244	Jason Duffy	2005	2005	4	0	0	0	0	
1174	John Duffy	2001	2012	202	52	19	4	250	Scotland
1374	Ryan Duffy	2013	2014	28	5	0	0	20	
54	Harry Dunbavin	1897–98	1905–06	172	31	132	0	357	
56	Oliver Dunbavin	1897–98	1897–98	5	1	0	0	3	
972	Brian Dunn	1987–88	1992–93	81	22	0	0	88	
897	David Dunn	1980–81	1982–83	25	3	0	0	9	
1315	Jamie Durbin	2009	2010	23	13	0	0	52	
106	E. Durr	1900–01	1900–01	4	0	0	0	0	
718	Tony Dyson	1962–63	1962–63	8	0	0	0	0	
982	Adrian Earner	1987–88	1991–92	30	0	0	0	0	
19	John Eccleston	1895–96	1901–02	153	1	0	0	3	
762	David Eckersley	1967–68	1971–72	160	24	22	0	116	Lancashire
624	Sam Eckersley	1951–52	1956–57	18	2	0	0	6	
588	Harry Edden	1948–49	1954–55	174	5	0	0	15	
573	Alf Edge	1947–48	1949–50	36	1	0	0	3	
338	Jack Edwards	1929–30	1938–39	143	5	9	0	33	
944	Mark Edwards	1984–85	1984–85	1	0	0	0	0	
1106	Mike Edwards	1995–96	1995–96	5	6	0	0	24	
603	Joe Egan	1950–51	1954–55	104	6	1	0	20	
1045	John Elias	1992–93	1992–93	15	2	0	0	8	
1341	Jamie Ellis	2011	2011	31	34	14	0	164	
256	Wyndham Emery	1920–21	1927–28	193	72	1	0	218	Wales
1332	Jacob "Jake" Emmitt	2010	present (as of 2019)	89	15	1	0	62	
683	Lionel Emmitt	1958–59	1959–60	14	7	0	0	21	
1013	Paul Entwistle	1990–91	1990–91	2	0	0	0	0	
719	Terry Entwistle	1962–63	1968–69	152	14	1	0	44	
990	Andy Evans	1988–89	1990–91	9	0	0	0	0	
434	Arthur "Candy" Evans	1937–38	1937–38	3	0	0	0	0	
1415	Ben Evans	2016	2016	3	0	0	0	0	
969	Dave Evans	1986–87	1989–90	30	3	0	0	12	
686	Gordon Evans	1959–60	1963–64	47	9	0	0	27	
231	Jack Evans	1913–14	1913–14	1	0	0	0	0	
855	Phil Evans	1975–76	1975–76	3	0	0	0	0	
1349	Rhys Evans	2011	2018	25	7	1	0	30	
997	Stuart Evans	1988–89	1990–91	2	0	0	0	0	
330	Edwin Ewing	1928–29	1930–31	8	2	0	0	6	
259	Arnold Eyre	1920–21	1920–21	2	0	0	0	0	
847	Keith Fairbrother	1974–75	1974–75	8	0	0	0	0	
1131	Andy Fairclough	1997	2001	104	57	0	0	228	
839	Alan Fairhurst	1974–75	1980–81	42	6	25	8	76	
394	John Fairhurst	1934–35	1934–35	2	0	0	0	0	
173	Lawrence Fairhurst	1907–08	1907–08	2	0	0	0	0	
276	Mat Fairhurst	1921–22	1921–22	3	0	0	0	0	
940	Shaun Fairhurst	1984–85	1984–85	6	1	0	0	4	
648	Brian Fallon	1954–55	1960–61	217	54	233	0	628	
429	Albert Falwasser	1937–38	1937–38	1	0	0	0	0	
1036	Sean Fanning	1991–92	1994–95	30	9	35	0	106	
455	Ernest Farrar	1938–39	1938–39	8	0	0	0	0	
540	Joe Farrell	1946–47	1946–47	7	1	0	0	3	
403	Fred Farrington	1935–36	1936–37	70	1	92	0	187	
1412	Brad Fash	2016	2016	8	0	0	0	0	
642	John Feather	1954–55	1954–55	6	0	0	0	0	
1247	Dominic Fe'aunati	2005	2005	5	1	0	0	4	
1200	Leon Felton	2002	2002	7	2	0	0	8	
775	Stuart Ferguson	1969–70	1972–73	112	19	328	0	713	Wales
1236	Jason Ferris	2005	2005	4	1	0	0	4	
750	Jimmy Fiddler	1966–67	1978–79	219	33	311	16	737	Lancashire
700	Derek Fieldhouse	1961–62	1961–62	3	0	0	0	0	
528	Wilf Fields	1940–41	1940–41	2	0	7	0	14	
1371	Simon Finnigan	2013	2013	27	12	0	0	48	
669	Ray Fisher	1957–58	1962–63	120	23	0	0	69	
822	Les Fishwick	1973–74	1973–74	5	1	0	0	3	
23	Dai Fitzgerald	1895–96	1895–96	8	0	0	0	0	
906	Steve Fitzmartin	1981–82	1983–84	11	0	0	0	0	
823	Kevin Flanagan	1973–74	1973–74	4	0	0	0	0	
738	Ken Flannagan	1965–66	1965–66	1	0	0	0	0	
357	Mick/Ray Flannery	1931–32	1938–39	108	5	59	0	133	
1241	Darren Fleary	2005	2005	27	2	0	0	8	
795	Bob Fleet	1971–72	1972–73	8	1	0	0	3	
650	Jackie Fleming	1955–56	1955–56	6	2	0	0	6	
1429	Matty Fleming	2017	2017	10	2	0	0	8	
1060	Darren Fletcher	1993–94	1993–94	2	0	0	0	0	
813	Derek Fletcher	1973–74	1974–75	17	1	0	0	3	
714	Geoff Fletcher	1962–63	1976–77	154	11	0	0	33	
1108	Tim Fletcher	1995–96	1996	2	0	0	0	0	
589	Len Flint	1948–49	1948–49	1	0	0	0	0	
527	W. Flitcroft	1940–41	1940–41	1	0	0	0	0	
555	Barney Fogharty	1946–47	1946–47	1	0	0	0	0	
1469	Chris Follin	2018	2018	1	0	0	0	0	
1251	Carl Forber	2005	2006	30	14	36	0	128	
966	Mike Ford	1986–87	1987–88	27	9	0	1	37	
1391	Lewis Foster	2014	2016	10	1	0	0	4	
503	Peter Foster	1940–41	1940–41	5	0	0	0	0	
611	Peter Foster	1951–52	1958–59	236	15	2	0	49	Great Britain
336	Lance Fowler	1929–30	1929–30	13	1	1	0	5	
34	Henry Fox	1895–96	1898–99	48	0	0	0	0	
895	Phil/Philip Fox	1980–81	1986–87	196	96	0	0	352	
753	Ray Fox	1966–67	1970–71	27	1	17	0	37	
973	Mark Frame	1987–88	1987–88	4	0	0	0	0	
279	Jimmy France	1922–23	1927–28	142	63	0	0	189	
11	Teddy France	1895–96	1897–98	62	1	0	0	3	
616	Tom Freeman	1951–52	1956–57	6	0	0	0	0	
563	George Gabriel	1947–48	1947–48	9	1	0	0	3	
575	Maurice Gallagher	1947–48	1948–49	7	0	0	0	0	
1355	Tommy Gallagher	2012	2012	21	5	0	0	20	
167	Dick Gallop	1906–07	1913–14	160	18	0	0	54	Lancashire
1019	Paul Gamble	1990–91	1990–91	1	0	0	0	0	
82	Frank Ganley	1899–1900	1904–05	125	30	0	0	90	
318	Frank Ganley	1927–28	1927–28	1	0	0	0	0	
194	Herbert Ganley	1909–10	1925–26	164	29	59	0	205	Lancashire
1123	Justin Ganley	1997	1997	1	0	0	0	0	
629	Max Garbler	1952–53	1952–53	2	0	0	0	0	
1136	Steve Garcia	1998	1998	27	2	0	0	8	
1351	Mat Gardner	2012	2013	58	26	0	0	104	
44	Tom Garrity	1896–97	1896–97	13	1	0	0	3	
874	Tony Garrity	1977–78	1980–81	23	8	0	0	24	
145	Ben Gartland	1904–05	1907–08	29	0	0	0	0	
85	George Garvey	1899–1900	1899–1900	6	0	0	0	0	
1254	Dean Gaskell	2006	2006	24	13	0	0	52	
450	J. Gaskell	1938–39	1938–39	6	0	0	0	0	
776	Jim Gaskell	1969–70	1969–70	2	1	1	0	5	
1183	Jamie Gass	2001	2001	5	1	0	0	4	
942	Bryan Gelling	1984–85	1987–88	60	10	0	0	40	
615	John Geraghty	1951–52	1953–54	10	0	0	0	0	
1141	Shaun Geritas	1998	1998	8	0	0	0	0	
644	Jack Gibson	1954–55	1960–61	111	27	0	0	81	
1126	Steve Gibson	1997	1997	9	2	0	0	8	
1291	Chris Giles	2007	2008	20	7	0	0	28	
758	Laurie Gilfedder	1967–68	1968–69	40	4	83	0	178	
5	S. "Bummer" Gill	1895–96	1896–97	14	0	1	0	4	
526	… Gillingham	1940–41	1940–41	1	0	0	0	0	
830	Neil Gilmore	1973–74	1973–74	1	0	0	0	0	
1363	Lee Gittins	2012	2012	1	0	0	0	0	
872	Tommy Gittins	1977–78	1980–81	85	6	6	7	37	
1260	Tere Glassie	2006	2006	20	4	0	0	16	
835	Brian Gomm	1973–74	1973–74	1	0	0	0	0	
294	Nelson Goodwin	1925–26	1925–26	8	3	0	0	9	
346	Jimmy Gordon	1930–31	1930–31	12	1	0	0	3	
42	G. Gore	1896–97	1896–97	2	0	0	0	0	
203	Matthew Gore	1910–11	1910–11	1	2	0	0	6	
1006	Michael Gore	1989–90	1989–90	1	0	0	0	0	
968	Joe Gormally	1986–87	1986–87	1	0	0	0	0	
706	Terry Gorman	1961–62	1961–62	1	0	0	0	0	
1345	Andy Gorski	2011	2011	4	2	0	0	8	
251	Henry Gorst	1919–20	1919–20	2	0	0	0	0	
241	Tom Gotheridge	1914–15	1914–15	2	0	0	0	0	
1330	Tommy Goulden	2010	2015	155	53	0	0	212	
1198	Bobbie Goulding	2002	2002	8	4	2	1	21	
1116	Martin Goulding	1996	1998	3	1	0	0	4	
1227	Mick Govin	2004	2011	39	10	31	0	102	
377	Joe Grace	1933–34	1933–34	3	0	0	0	0	
1103	Gary Grainey	1995–96	1996	3	0	0	0	0	
702	Tommy Grainey	1961–62	1972–73	164	16	135	0	318	
1464	Sam Grant	2018	2018	1	0	0	0	0	
131	Dick Green	1902–03	1902–03	1	0	0	0	0	
601	Harry Green	1949–50	1952–53	24	5	0	0	15	
1424	James Green	2017	2017	9	0	0	0	0	
317	Jimmy Green	1927–28	1939–40	205	46	26	0	190	
873	Ken Green	1977–78	1983–84	131	16	0	0	49	
76	J. Greenhalgh	1898–99	1899–1900	4	1	0	0	3	
400	Joe Greenhalgh	1934–35	1938–39	81	7	0	0	21	
1257	Lee Greenwood	2006	2006	28	24	0	0	96	
1273	Miles Greenwood	2007	2007	26	16	0	0	64	
704	Eric Gregory	1961–62	1964–65	14	2	0	0	6	
442	Fred Gregory	1937–38	1938–39	4	0	0	0	0	
1451	Nick Gregson	2018	present (as of 2019)	14	2	3	0	14	
331	Mick Griffin	1928–29	1931–32	119	22	2	0	70	
375	J. B. Griffiths	1932–33	1932–33	2	0	0	0	0	
918	Steve Griffiths	1983–84	1983–84	3	0	0	0	0	
1082	Steve Griffiths	1994–95	1994–95	4	0	0	0	0	
172	E. Grime	1907–08	1907–08	1	0	0	0	0	
769	Paul Grimes	1968–69	1978–79	216	19	0	0	57	
530	Tommy Grimes	1940–41	1940–41	2	2	0	0	6	
842	Steve Grimshaw	1974–75	1980–81	73	10	0	0	30	
1253	Scott Grix	2006	2006	28	13	0	0	52	
1147	Andrew "Andy" Grundy	1998	1998	20	1	0	0	4	
240	Frank Grundy	1914–15	1920–21	64	13	0	0	39	
312	James Grundy	1926–27	1927–28	15	1	0	0	3	
421	Stan Grundy	1936–37	1937–38	17	1	0	0	3	
1255	Tommy Grundy	2006	2007	30	10	0	0	40	
272	Walter Grundy	1921–22	1924–25	6	1	0	0	3	
651	Don Gullick	1955–56	1957–58	45	15	0	0	45	
1049	John Gunning	1992–93	1998	92	10	21	6	88	
1101	Alan Hadcroft	1995–96	2003	154	44	0	0	176	
1321	Kurt Haggerty	2009	2015	55	15	1	1	63	
432	Herbert "Tubby" Haigh	1937–38	1937–38	4	1	0	0	3	
456	Bill Hall	1938–39	1938–39	2	0	0	0	0	
1435	Craig Hall	2018	2018	20	21	11	0	106	
1096	Darren Hall	1995–96	1999	3	1	0	0	4	
723	Harry Hall	1963–64	1963–64	1	0	0	0	0	
27	John Hall	1895–96	1895–96	1	0	0	0	0	
1054	Tony Hall	1993–94	1993–94	3	1	0	0	4	
1161	Chris Halliwell	1999	2000	6	1	0	0	4	
1212	Danny Halliwell	2003	2007	74	59	6	0	248	
945	Steve Halliwell	1985–86	1985–86	38	49	0	0	196	
420	Tom Halliwell	1936–37	1936–37	6	1	0	0	3	
177	Billy Halsall	1907–08	1907–08	6	0	0	0	0	
1086	Ian Halsall	1994–95	1996	5	0	0	0	0	
508	F. Hamer	1940–41	1940–41	1	0	0	0	0	
692	Gerald Hamilton	1960–61	1964–65	2	0	0	0	0	
1177	John Hamilton	2001	2003	71	7	0	0	28	
533	Vince Hammond	1940–41	1940–41	2	0	0	0	0	
1419	Ryan Hampshire	2017	2017	16	3	0	0	12	
1051	Dean Hanger	1992–93	1993–94	38	18	0	0	72	
1390	Chris Hankinson	2014	2014	7	2	0	0	8	
1402	Harrison Hansen	2016	2018	85	22	0	0	88	
1031	Liuaki "Lee" Hansen	1991–92	1993–94	65	2	0	0	8	
943	Paul Hardman	1984–85	1986–87	11	1	0	0	4	
1271	Bryn Hargreaves	2006	2006	10	1	0	0	4	
31	R. "Whiffy" Hargreaves	1895–96	1895–96	8	0	0	0	0	
1408	Eze Harper	2016	2016	3	1	0	0	4	
466	Albert Harris	1938–39	1938–39	2	0	0	0	0	
698	Danny Harris	1961–62	1966–67	46	1	0	0	3	
345	Fred Harris	1930–31	1934–35	140	46	1	0	140	England
546	George Harris	1946–47	1948–49	42	2	0	0	6	
110	Joe Harris	1901–02	1901–02	5	0	0	0	0	
586	Norman Harris	1948–49	1951–52	118	16	0	0	48	Wales
754	Alan Harrison	1966–67	1968–69	8	0	0	0	0	
834	Paul Harrison	1973–74	1973–74	1	0	0	0	0	
773	Albert Hart	1969–70	1969–70	11	1	0	0	3	
407	Ernie Hart	1935–36	1935–36	1	0	0	0	0	
435	Fred Hart	1937–38	1939–40	86	5	1	0	17	
673	Gerald Hart	1957–58	1959–60	13	1	35	0	73	
1137	Dave Hartill	1998	1998	4	0	0	0	0	
514	Danny Hartley	1940–41	1940–41	8	0	1	0	2	
1328	Tim Hartley	2010	2010	5	0	9	0	18	
1124	Joe Harvey	1997	1997	2	0	0	1	1	
1311	Dean Hatton	2008	2008	1	0	0	0	0	
388	George "Bud" Hayes	1934–35	1938–39	139	6	11	0	40	
614	Jack Hayes	1951–52	1952–53	7	3	0	0	9	
516	Stanley Hayes	1940–41	1940–41	1	0	0	0	0	
1029	Tommy Hayes	1991–92	1991–92	18	3	0	0	12	
267	Peter Heaton	1920–21	1922–23	33	4	1	0	14	
437	Jack Helme	1937–38	1939–40	52	7	12	0	45	
1326	Tom Hemingway	2009	2009	6	0	0	1	1	
28	… Hemmings	1895–96	1895–96	3	0	0	0	0	
1208	Bryan Henare	2003	2003	29	3	0	0	12	
907	John Henderson	1982–83	1988–89	166	84	1	0	333	Lancashire
1240	Kevin Henderson	2005	2012	15	2	0	0	8	
950	Bob Henson	1985–86	1985–86	5	0	0	0	0	
1001	Graham Herbert	1989–90	1989–90	3	1	0	0	4	
930	Martin Herdman	1983–84	1983–84	2	0	0	0	0	
1263	Aaron Heremaia	2006	2007	54	31	26	3	179	
399	Jack Hesketh	1934–35	1935–36	19	2	1	0	8	
438	Norman Hesketh	1937–38	1937–38	11	0	0	0	0	
452	Albert Hewitt	1938–39	1938–39	30	6	0	0	18	
666	Fred Hewitt	1957–58	1962–63	75	1	11	0	25	
824	Ray Hicks	1973–74	1973–74	3	0	0	0	0	
534	Fred Higginbottom	1940–41	1940–41	1	0	0	0	0	
679	Derek Higgs	1958–59	1968–69	178	9	0	0	27	
675	Bill High	1957–58	1957–58	1	1	0	0	3	
229	George Higham	1913–14	1920–21	58	11	1	0	35	
1153	Mickey Higham	1999	present (as of 2019)	125	39	0	0	156	
742	Brian Highcock	1966–67	1971–72	56	3	0	0	9	
1195	David Highton	2002	2002	4	2	0	0	8	
1310	Adam Higson	2008	present (as of 2019)	155	65	0	0	260	
324	Bill Higson	1928–29	1932–33	55	17	3	0	57	
119	Dick Higson	1902–03	1907–08	17	0	0	0	0	
1252	Chris Hill	2005	2011	160	35	0	0	140	
992	David Hill	1988–89	1998	206	50	0	0	200	
64	Fred Hill	1897–98	1897–98	1	0	0	0	0	
1377	James Hill	2013	2013	2	0	0	0	0	
612	Joe Hill	1951–52	1952–53	9	0	0	0	0	
1277	John Hill	2007	2008	14	1	0	0	4	
303	Albert Hilton	1925–26	1925–26	3	0	0	0	0	
222	Arthur Hilton	1912–13	1913–14	5	0	1	0	2	
337	Fred Hilton	1929–30	1933–34	29	0	0	0	0	
301	Herbert Hilton	1925–26	1926–27	14	1	0	0	3	
99	Jimmy Hilton	1900–01	1903–04	15	0	0	0	0	
1121	Scott Hilton	1997	1999	23	6	0	0	24	
58	F. Hindley	1897–98	1898–99	2	0	0	0	0	
74	Jim Hindley	1898–99	1898–99	1	0	0	0	0	
732	Jim Hindley	1965–66	1967–68	22	2	0	0	6	
121	Herbert Hinson	1902–03	1902–03	12	0	1	0	2	
1297	Andy Hobson	2008	2009	34	6	0	0	24	
894	Ian Hobson	1979–80	1980–81	19	2	0	0	6	
1397	Gareth Hock	2015	present (as of 2019)	53	12	0	0	48	
230	Fred Hockey	1913–14	1913–14	1	0	0	0	0	
703	Ian Hodgkiss	1961–62	1964–65	46	21	0	0	63	
50	William Hodgson	1897–98	1897–98	24	11	0	0	33	
1191	Ian Hodson	2002	2002	4	0	0	0	0	
722	Jim Hoffman	1963–64	1968–69	52	7	0	0	21	
804	Mick Hogan	1972–73	1983–84	296	41	0	0	125	Lancashire
558	Ken Holdbrook	1946–47	1950–51	17	5	0	0	15	
401	Bob Holden	1935–36	1936–37	25	4	0	0	12	
637	Keith Holden	1953–54	1958–59	142	58	0	0	174	
1206	Dale Holdstock	2003	2003	20	8	0	0	32	
492	Tommy Holland	1939–40	1939–40	2	0	0	0	0	
980	Mike Holliday	1987–88	1988–89	4	0	0	0	0	
216	Bert Holt	1912–13	1912–13	1	0	0	0	0	
71	William Holvey	1898–99	1898–99	1	0	0	0	0	
1410	Liam Hood	2016	present (as of 2019)	65	26	0	0	104	
1347	Sam Hopkins	2011	2017	161	55	0	0	220	Wales
974	Shane Horo	1987–88	1987–88	15	9	0	0	36	
68	Bob Horrocks	1898–99	1899–1900	5	0	0	0	0	
43	Dick Hosker	1896–97	1896–97	4	0	0	0	0	
649	Joe Hosking	1955–56	1962–63	102	13	191	0	421	
1290	Chris Hough	2007	2007	7	1	0	0	4	
360	Allan Houghton	1931–32	1933–34	41	14	0	0	42	
310	Joe Houghton	1926–27	1928–29	70	23	0	0	69	
770	John Houghton	1968–69	1968–69	4	0	7	0	14	
796	Steve Houghton	1971–72	1973–74	33	8	0	0	24	
684	Brian Howard	1959–60	1961–62	79	15	0	0	45	
288	William Howard	1924–25	1924–25	3	0	0	0	0	
464	Billy Howarth	1938–39	1938–39	1	0	0	0	0	
891	Roy Howarth	1979–80	1985–86	69	5	18	4	58	
959	Garry Howell	1986–87	1986–87	8	1	0	0	4	
963	Milton Huddart	1986–87	1986–87	25	1	0	1	5	
1132	Ian Hudspith	1997	1998	16	2	0	0	8	
1256	Adam Hughes	2006	2007	31	15	12	0	84	
253	Albert Hughes	1920–21	1920–21	6	2	0	0	6	
843	Eric Hughes	1974–75	1976–77	14	0	0	0	0	
924	Gary Hughes	1983–84	1986–87	59	7	0	0	28	
594	George Hughes	1949–50	1951–52	47	4	0	0	12	
1380	Jack Hughes	2013	2013	1	0	0	0	0	
49	Daff Hulme	1896–97	1896–97	2	0	0	0	0	
384	John Hulme	1933–34	1933–34	3	0	0	0	0	
688	Jim Humble	1959–60	1961–62	62	28	0	0	84	
335	Jack Hunt	1929–30	1929–30	1	0	0	0	0	
159	Billy Hunter	1906–07	1906–07	6	2	0	0	6	
908	Edwin "Eddie" Hunter	1982–83	1983–84	28	5	0	0	16	
315	Danny Hurcombe	1927–28	1929–30	29	3	3	0	15	
212	Albert Hurst	1911–12	1912–13	4	0	0	0	0	
269	Fred Hurst	1920–21	1921–22	15	4	0	0	12	
645	Derek Hurt	1954–55	1963–64	289	46	51	0	240	
316	Tommy Hurtley	1927–28	1931–32	142	18	83	0	220	
382	Dick Hutchinson	1933–34	1940–41	82	15	3	0	51	
1438	Drew Hutchison	2018	2018	35	13	0	0	52	
658	Bill Hutson	1956–57	1960–61	50	14	4	0	50	
641	Ernie Hutson	1954–55	1958–59	37	25	0	0	75	
1080	David Ingram	1994–95	2002	165	100	3	0	406	
1010	Tony Iro	1990–91	1990–91	11	4	0	0	16	
1185	Chris Irwin	2002	2002	23	11	0	0	44	
1230	Luke Isakka	2004	2004	2	0	0	0	0	
1187	Andrew Isherwood	2002	2004	60	33	0	0	132	
184	Dan Isherwood	1908–09	1909–10	37	9	1	0	29	
152	Harry Isherwood	1904–05	1904–05	1	0	0	0	0	
1287	Chad Isles	2007	2007	3	0	0	0	0	
457	Ned Jacks	1938–39	1938–39	26	0	0	0	0	
77	Alf Jackson	1898–99	1900–01	4	0	0	0	0	
499	Jim Jackson	1939–40	1939–40	1	1	0	0	3	
389	Jimmy Jackson	1934–35	1934–35	4	0	0	0	0	
716	John Jackson	1962–63	1962–63	3	0	0	0	0	
1237	Rob Jackson	2005	2005	26	6	0	0	24	
40	Tom Jackson	1896–97	1896–97	8	0	0	0	0	
199	Claude James	1910–11	1910–11	8	0	3	0	6	
465	Gwynn James	1938–39	1938–39	2	0	0	0	0	
200	Willie James	1910–11	1910–11	10	1	0	0	3	
122	Peter Jameson	1902–03	1903–04	27	0	0	0	0	
964	Ian Jeffrey	1986–87	1991–92	176	71	2	1	289	
584	Emlyn Jenkins	1948–49	1949–50	2	1	0	0	3	
1127	Nick Jenkins	1997	1999	48	8	0	0	32	
592	Glyn John	1949–50	1949–50	3	1	0	0	3	
260	Abe Johnson	1920–21	1931–32	150	41	165	0	453	Lancashire
187	Billy Johnson	1908–09	1910–11	2	0	0	0	0	
929	Chris Johnson	1983–84	1989–90	183	38	454	13	1073	Great Britain
1307	Craig Johnson	2008	2008	1	1	0	0	4	
380	Fred Johnson	1933–34	1937–38	110	26	6	0	90	
1181	Jason Johnson	2001	2001	14	8	0	0	32	
1460	Josh Johnson	2018	2018	7	0	0	0	0	
578	Keith Johnson	1948–49	1948–49	19	0	0	0	0	
1023	Kevin Johnson	1990–91	1992–93	5	0	0	0	0	
928	Phil Johnson	1983–84	1991–92	160	28	128	7	375	
95	Sam Johnson	1900–01	1914–15	392	91	76	0	425	Lancashire
156	Tom Johnson	1905–06	1914–15	238	56	2	0	172	
463	Griff Johnston	1938–39	1939–40	26	5	0	0	15	
204	Jimmy Jolley	1910–11	1911–12	13	0	5	0	10	
531	Stan Jolley	1940–41	1940–41	1	1	0	0	3	
246	Alf Jones	1919–20	1919–20	1	0	0	0	0	
1249	Chris Jones	2005	2005	2	0	0	0	0	
848	Clive Jones	1974–75	1978–79	112	11	0	0	33	Wales
363	Dai Jones	1931–32	1931–32	8	1	0	0	3	
1179	David Jones	2001	2001	12	3	0	0	12	
170	Edward Jones	1907–08	1914–15	93	2	0	0	6	
444	Ernie Jones	1937–38	1939–40	6	1	0	0	3	
405	Ernie Jones	1935–36	1937–38	7	0	0	0	0	
768	Ian Jones	1968–69	1968–69	7	0	0	0	0	
1072	Ken Jones	1994–95	1994–95	9	0	0	0	0	
1228	Phil Jones	2004	2005	21	9	37	0	110	
1069	Simon Jones	1993–94	1993–94	2	0	0	0	0	
107	W. Jones	1901–02	1901–02	1	0	0	0	0	
1281	Tim Jonkers	2007	2007	9	1	0	0	4	
1084	Neil Jukes	1994–95	1997	32	7	0	1	29	
1284	Daryl Kay	2007	2007	8	1	0	0	4	
939	David Kay	1984–85	1984–85	2	1	0	0	4	
660	John Kay	1956–57	1959–60	15	3	0	0	9	
1388	Liam Kay	2014	2016	82	74	0	0	296	
1113	Mark Kay	1996	1998	12	0	0	0	0	
535	Bill Kearsley	1940–41	1940–41	1	0	0	0	0	
878	Alan Keavney	1978–79	1980–81	5	0	0	0	0	
1304	Martin Keavney	2008	2008	3	3	0	0	12	
376	Billy Kedward	1932–33	1932–33	2	1	0	0	3	
218	Bob Keegan	1912–13	1919–20	90	24	1	0	74	
333	John Keegan	1928–29	1933–34	54	5	1	0	17	
123	Jimmy Kelly	1902–03	1904–05	81	1	0	0	3	
803	Paul Kelly	1972–73	1973–74	19	4	0	0	12	
1114	Paul Kelly	1996	1996	3	0	0	0	0	
103	Tom Kelly	1900–01	1900–01	1	0	0	0	0	
1142	Phil Kendrick	1998	2003	123	49	34	2	266	
1158	Jamie Kennedy	1999	1999	24	5	0	0	20	
323	Jack Kenny	1928–29	1938–39	117	44	0	0	132	
1232	Jason Kent	2005	2005	26	1	0	0	4	
946	John Kerr	1985–86	1989–90	120	54	0	0	216	
1159	Ken Kerr	1999	1999	12	6	0	0	24	
553	Edward "Ted" Kerwick	1946–47	1952–53	202	71	0	0	213	England
934	Ivan Kete	1984–85	1984–85	2	0	0	0	0	
100	Tom Kight	1900–01	1904–05	58	8	0	0	24	
496	Jimmy Kilgannon	1939–40	1939–40	1	0	0	0	0	
1468	Ben Kilner	2018	2018	1	0	0	0	0	
587	Bill Kindon	1948–49	1959–60	259	149	0	0	447	Lancashire
239	Jack King	1914–15	1920–21	8	0	0	0	0	
1238	James King	2005	2005	14	2	0	0	8	
415	John Kirby	1935–36	1937–38	7	0	0	0	0	
520	P. Kirby	1940–41	1940–41	1	0	0	0	0	
171	Robert Kirby	1907–08	1907–08	3	0	0	0	0	
125	Ben Kirk	1902–03	1910–11	50	3	0	0	9	
709	Frank Kirk	1962–63	1962–63	3	0	0	0	0	
96	Tom Kirk	1900–01	1903–04	63	0	0	0	0	
815	Bill Kirkbride	1973–74	1973–74	5	0	0	0	0	
911	Michael Patrick "Paddy" Kirwan	1982–83	1982–83	8	2	0	0	6	
606	Frank Kitchen	1950–51	1956–57	107	79	0	0	237	Great Britain
995	Mark Knight	1988–89	1988–89	10	0	0	0	0	
1219	Ian Knott	2004	2005	39	19	2	0	80	
479	Joe Knowles	1939–40	1939–40	1	0	0	0	0	
1194	Simon Knox	2002	2004	49	9	0	0	36	
1294	Toa Kohe-Love	2008	2008	17	10	0	0	40	
1362	James Laithwaite	2012	present (as of 2019)	12	3	0	0	12	
160	H. Lambert	1906–07	1906–07	1	0	0	0	0	
35	Duncan Lamonby	1895–96	1895–96	4	0	1	0	4	
697	Chris Landsberg	1960–61	1961–62	7	2	0	0	6	
197	Tom Lane	1910–11	1910–11	2	1	0	0	3	
986	Shaun Lang	1987–88	1990–91	10	2	0	0	8	
362	Bryan Langford	1931–32	1934–35	76	0	0	0	0	
1431	Samisoni Langi	2017	2017	9	1	0	0	4	
602	Paddy Lannon	1949–50	1952–53	30	3	0	0	9	
1218	David Larder	2004	2004	28	6	0	0	24	
711	Ken Large	1962–63	1964–65	31	11	0	0	33	
1446	Kevin Larroyer	2018	2018	26	9	0	0	36	
93	R. Latham	1899–1900	1899–1900	1	0	0	0	0	
182	Joseph Lavery	1908–09	1908–09	12	3	0	0	9	
809	Graeme Lawson	1972–73	1972–73	7	4	0	0	12	
1104	Steve Lay	1995–96	1995–96	4	1	0	0	4	
849	Gordon Leadbetter	1974–75	1974–75	4	0	0	0	0	
693	Tony Leadbetter	1960–61	1965–66	133	44	0	0	132	
1235	Mark Leafa	2005	2005	31	2	0	0	8	
166	Bill Leah	1906–07	1910–11	17	0	0	0	0	
1168	Andrew "Andy" Leathem	2000	2001	38	1	0	0	4	
574	Jimmy Ledgard	1947–48	1957–58	334	36	1043	0	2194	Great Britain
987	Barry/Barrie Ledger	1988–89	1992–93	91	62	0	0	248	
136	Aaron Lee	1903–04	1912–13	264	12	0	0	36	Lancashire
497	James Lee	1939–40	1939–40	1	0	0	0	0	
137	Sam Lees	1903–04	1903–04	4	0	1	0	2	
367	Elwyn Leigh	1932–33	1932–33	1	0	0	0	0	
748	Roy Lester	1966–67	1976–77	83	12	0	0	36	
962	James Leuluai	1986–87	1986–87	25	6	0	0	24	
1322	Macgraff Leuluai	2009	2012	40	6	0	0	24	
1081	Dave Lever	1994–95	1994–95	8	0	0	0	0	
680	Gordon Lewis	1958–59	1970–71	386	112	0	0	336	Great Britain
1157	Ian Lewis	1999	1999	4	1	0	0	4	
701	John Lewis	1961–62	1966–67	91	2	0	0	6	
133	William Lewis	1903–04	1903–04	1	0	0	0	0	
283	Jimmy Leyland	1923–24	1931–32	250	7	0	0	21	
1073	Tauʻalupe Liku	1994–95	1999	121	27	0	0	108	
1449	Jordan Lilley	2018	2018	1	0	3	0	6	
402	John Litherland	1935–36	1937–38	17	3	0	0	9	
1342	Stuart Littler	2011	2014	101	32	0	0	128	Ireland
196	Ben Lloyd	1910–11	1913–14	18	1	0	0	3	
656	Edward Lloyd	1955–56	1955–56	3	0	0	0	0	
1378	Rhodri Lloyd	2013	2013	3	0	0	0	0	
416	Joe Lomas	1936–37	1939–40	66	24	0	0	72	
1444	Kyle Lovett	2018	2018	10	4	0	0	16	
447	Harry Lowe	1938–39	1940–41	22	1	0	0	3	
481	J. Lowe	1939–40	1939–40	2	1	0	0	3	
610	Jack Lowe	1950–51	1955–56	53	9	18	0	63	
192	Jimmy Lowe	1909–10	1918–19	120	14	0	0	42	
565	Jimmy Lowe	1947–48	1947–48	1	0	0	0	0	
737	John Lowe	1965–66	1969–70	23	3	0	0	9	
327	John Lynch	1928–29	1928–29	1	0	0	0	0	
1110	David Lyon	1996	1996	13	8	0	0	32	
771	Geoff Lyon	1969–70	1969–70	36	6	0	0	18	
1134	James Macaree	1997	1997	1	0	0	0	0	
831	Dave Macko	1973–74	1978–79	103	30	0	0	90	Lancashire
14	Bob MacMasters	1895–96	1901–02	150	11	1	0	35	Lancashire
179	Sam MacMasters	1908–09	1908–09	1	0	0	0	0	
1209	Keiron Maddocks	2003	2005	5	0	0	0	0	
1213	Steve Maden	2004	2014	210	73	0	0	292	
1043	Scott Mahon	1992–93	1992–93	18	3	0	0	12	
1403	Reni Maitua	2016	2016	29	14	0	0	56	
757	Harry Major	1967–68	1969–70	55	2	0	0	6	
356	Ted Makin	1931–32	1932–33	16	2	0	0	6	
1062	Sean Maloney	1993–94	1994–95	19	4	0	0	16	
38	Arthur Maltby	1896–97	1896–97	4	1	0	0	3	
921	Tony Manfredi	1983–84	1987–88	20	1	0	0	4	
994	George Mann	1988–89	1988–89	13	4	0	0	16	
366	Archie Mansfield	1932–33	1932–33	2	0	0	0	0	
870	John Mantle	1977–78	1978–79	39	4	0	0	12	
1266	Misili Manu	2006	2006	10	8	0	0	32	
1425	Antoni Maria	2017	2017	15	2	0	0	8	
853	Dave Markland	1974–75	1974–75	1	0	0	0	0	
1197	Oliver Marns	2002	2002	13	7	0	0	28	
491	E. Marsh	1939–40	1939–40	1	0	0	0	0	
475	Fred Marsh	1939–40	1939–40	18	4	0	0	12	
871	Ged Marsh	1977–78	1978–79	16	1	0	3	6	
45	H. Marsh	1896–97	1896–97	5	0	0	0	0	
180	Harry Marsh	1908–09	1919–20	134	10	0	0	30	
1305	Lee Marsh	2008	2009	19	6	9	0	42	
1065	Paul Marsh	1993–94	1996	26	0	0	0	0	
486	Frank Marshall	1939–40	1940–41	9	1	2	0	7	
1221	Richard Marshall	2004	2005	46	2	0	1	9	
599	Peter Marston	1949–50	1952–53	40	3	0	0	9	
373	Hal Martin	1932–33	1933–34	8	1	0	0	3	
1046	Scott Martin	1992–93	1994–95	65	16	0	0	64	
1289	Sébastien Martins	2007	2007	11	3	0	0	12	
640	Mick Martyn	1954–55	1967–68	329	189	0	0	567	Great Britain
1210	Tommy Martyn	2003	2004	36	26	3	4	114	
792	Thomas "Tommy" Martyn	1971–72	1983–84	165	23	0	0	70	Lancashire
1109	Alan Mason	1996	1996	20	7	0	4	32	
392	Bill Mason	1934–35	1935–36	28	5	0	0	15	
1443	Nathan Mason	2018	2018	21	6	0	0	24	
1436	Peter Mata'utia	2018	2018	20	9	0	0	36	
1190	Vila Matautia	2002	2002	25	2	0	0	8	
150	Gomer Mathias	1904–05	1904–05	2	0	0	0	0	
948	Peter Mayoh	1985–86	1985–86	19	8	0	0	32	
869	Billy McAtee	1976–77	1976–77	2	0	0	0	0	
807	John McAtee	1972–73	1978–79	148	30	0	0	90	
782	Peter McAtee	1970–71	1970–71	2	0	0	0	0	
1293	Nathan McAvoy	2008	2008	11	5	0	0	20	
1129	Rob McAvoy	1997	1997	1	0	0	0	0	
21	Sam McCarthy	1895–96	1895–96	37	1	0	0	3	
397	Tom McCarthy	1934–35	1935–36	19	1	0	0	3	
1334	Tyrone McCarthy	2010	2011	18	6	0	0	24	
1216	Dave McConnell	2004	2010	112	28	0	0	112	Scotland
791	Charlie McCourt	1971–72	1971–72	1	0	0	0	0	
1083	Steve McCulley	1994–95	1997	5	1	0	0	4	
957	Neil McCulloch	1986–87	1991–92	95	35	0	0	140	
1193	Mark McCully	2002	2004	35	13	18	0	88	
1233	Steve McCurrie	2005	2005	12	1	0	0	4	
608	Bill McFarlane	1950–51	1958–59	138	25	0	0	75	
654	Joe McFarlane	1955–56	1957–58	19	5	0	0	15	
365	Jim McGarr	1931–32	1932–33	9	1	0	0	3	
433	Bill McGarrigan	1937–38	1937–38	5	1	0	0	3	
205	Tom McGeiver	1910–11	1913–14	36	3	0	0	9	
671	Mike McGillicuddy	1957–58	1958–59	12	0	0	0	0	
1339	Dean McGilvray	2011	2012	38	15	0	0	60	
1003	Paul McGrory	1989–90	1989–90	1	0	0	0	0	
1098	Mark McGughan	1995–96	1997	45	6	0	0	24	
630	Bernard McGurrin	1952–53	1954–55	44	17	0	0	51	
393	James McHugh	1934–35	1935–36	17	0	0	0	0	
1075	Paul McLoughlin	1994–95	1997	33	9	0	0	36	
1350	Gregg McNally	2012	present (as of 2019)	147	94	20	0	416	Ireland
887	Mick McTigue	1978–79	1982–83	66	8	0	0	24	
746	John McVay	1966–67	1975–76	44	1	0	0	3	
379	Harry Meadows	1933–34	1939–40	56	0	28	0	56	
1063	Mark Meadows	1993–94	1994–95	37	3	0	0	12	
1246	Robbie Mears	2005	2005	14	0	0	0	0	
1074	Neil Measures	1994–95	1994–95	21	1	0	0	4	
1319	Danny Meekin	2009	2010	26	1	0	0	4	
981	Alex Melling	1987–88	1987–88	1	0	0	0	0	
785	Billy Melling	1970–71	1973–74	47	8	0	0	24	
195	Harry Melling	1910–11	1912–13	23	1	0	0	3	
904	Sean Mellor	1981–82	1988–89	22	1	0	0	4	
1020	Terry Mellor	1990–91	1991–92	6	0	0	0	0	
1369	James Mendeika	2012	2012	2	1	0	0	4	
88	Reuben Mercer	1899–1900	1899–1900	2	0	0	0	0	
142	Bobby Messer	1903–04	1905–06	48	8	0	0	24	
734	Charlie Middlehurst	1965–66	1972–73	31	1	2	0	7	
129	George Milburn	1902–03	1902–03	2	0	0	0	0	
548	Jack "Cod" Miller	1946–47	1947–48	25	2	0	0	6	
1135	Paul Miller	1997	1997	2	0	0	0	0	
747	Sid Miller	1966–67	1966–67	10	1	0	0	3	
1343	David Mills	2011	2011	30	6	0	0	24	
901	Steve Mills	1981–82	1981–82	3	0	3	0	6	
1192	Colin Milner	2002	2002	1	0	0	0	0	
1331	Lee Mitchell	2010	2011	16	7	0	0	28	
281	Tony Mitchell	1922–23	1922–23	6	1	0	0	3	
1395	Fuifui Moimoi	2015	2016	45	11	1	0	46	
991	Robert Moimoi	1988–89	1989–90	39	9	0	0	36	
18	Jimmy Molyneux	1895–96	1908–09	229	30	144	0	382	
418	John Molyneux	1936–37	1938–39	46	2	0	0	6	
371	Bob Montford	1932–33	1948–49	217	4	8	0	28	
430	Walter Moon	1937–38	1940–41	4	0	0	0	0	
780	Mick Mooney	1970–71	1972–73	54	3	1	0	11	
214	Walter Mooney	1918–19	1925–26	194	30	4	0	98	Great Britain
213	William Mooney	1911–12	1913–14	13	2	0	0	6	
628	Albert Moore	1952–53	1955–56	54	20	5	0	70	
569	Frank Moore	1947–48	1947–48	24	0	0	0	0	
1025	Jim Moore	1991–92	1991–92	7	0	0	0	0	
1234	Richard Moore	2005	2006	17	5	0	0	20	
936	Dave Moran	1984–85	1984–85	1	0	0	0	0	
1295	Dennis Moran	2008	2008	15	4	1	1	19	
290	Hubert Moran	1924–25	1926–27	5	0	4	0	8	
391	John Moran	1934–35	1937–38	62	0	0	0	0	
1039	Mark Moran	1992–93	1992–93	5	0	0	0	0	
598	Frank Morgan	1949–50	1958–59	75	29	0	0	87	
1178	Chris Morley	2001	2002	51	14	0	0	56	
368	Ellis Morley	1932–33	1936–37	57	0	0	0	0	
1302	Mike Morrison	2008	2010	67	9	0	0	36	
408	C. G. Morrow	1935–36	1935–36	1	0	0	0	0	
1309	Ian Mort	2008	2010	40	20	102	0	284	
1432	Daniel Mortimer	2017	2018	19	8	0	0	32	
308	Tommy Moss	1926–27	1929–30	53	13	6	0	51	
619	Rex Mossop	1951–52	1954–55	98	16	0	0	48	
1202	Damian Munro	2003	2006	49	42	0	0	168	
755	Alex Murphy	1967–68	1970–71	118	33	96	0	291	England
1348	Chris Murphy	2011	2011	1	1	0	0	4	
529	Harry Murphy	1940–41	1940–41	2	2	0	0	6	
639	James Murphy	1953–54	1956–57	18	2	0	0	6	
262	John Murphy	1920–21	1920–21	1	0	0	0	0	
721	Mick Murphy	1963–64	1968–69	166	7	0	0	21	
1140	Anthony Murray	1998	2000	74	36	1	0	146	
778	Tony Musgrave	1969–70	1972–73	8	0	0	0	0	
286	Bert Myers	1924–25	1929–30	130	15	1	0	47	
261	Billy Myers	1920–21	1920–21	8	0	0	0	0	
832	Harold Myers	1973–74	1976–77	3	0	0	0	0	
489	Frank Myerscough	1939–40	1940–41	10	0	0	0	0	
1021	John Myler	1990–91	1990–91	6	1	7	0	18	
63	Jimmy Nall	1897–98	1899–1900	7	0	0	0	0	
1323	Mick Nanyn	2009	2011	66	54	258	0	732	
1335	Stephen Nash	2010	2012	37	6	0	0	24	
1426	Curtis Naughton	2017	2017	6	4	0	0	16	
115	William Naughton	1901–02	1906–07	32	1	0	0	3	
542	Bob Naylor	1946–47	1948–49	17	7	0	0	21	
1306	Kyle Neal	2008	2008	3	0	0	0	0	
1067	Mike Neal	1993–94	1993–94	6	0	0	0	0	
727	George Nellis	1964–65	1965–66	4	0	0	0	0	
268	Teddy Nelson	1920–21	1923–24	17	0	1	0	2	
124	Bob Neville	1902–03	1913–14	238	88	0	0	264	
705	Albert Newall	1961–62	1965–66	32	1	0	0	3	
1040	Keith Newton	1992–93	1992–93	11	0	0	0	0	
1336	Anthony Nicholson	2010	2013	45	8	0	0	32	
1203	Sonny Nickle	2003	2003	30	4	0	0	16	
1125	Matt Nixon	1997	1998	18	3	0	0	12	
493	Frank Nolan	1939–40	1939–40	3	1	1	0	5	
468	Dick Noonan	1939–40	1946–47	12	0	0	0	0	
97	John Norbury	1900–01	1901–02	28	0	0	0	0	
1148	Paul Norman	1998	2004	109	9	0	0	36	
148	Tom O'Brien	1904–05	1910–11	8	1	0	0	3	
636	Tom O'Brien	1953–54	1956–57	18	4	0	0	12	
522	George O'Donnell	1940–41	1940–41	4	0	0	0	0	
1373	John O'Donnell	2013	2013	7	2	0	0	8	
521	Peter O'Donnell	1940–41	1940–41	2	0	0	0	0	
33	John Officer	1895–96	1896–97	11	1	0	0	3	
793	Alan Ogden	1971–72	1972–73	30	3	0	0	9	
292	Ernie Ogden	1924–25	1929–30	42	2	0	0	6	
1002	Mike Ogden	1989–90	1989–90	2	1	0	0	4	
1071	Jason O'Loughlin	1994–95	1998	115	19	16	3	111	
998	Keiron O'Loughlin	1989–90	1989–90	3	0	0	0	0	
1466	Jacques O'Neill	2018	2018	1	0	0	0	0	
163	James O'Neill	1906–07	1920–21	10	0	0	0	0	
1258	Julian O'Neill	2006	2006	12	1	58	2	122	
132	Paddy O'Neill	1902–03	1910–11	211	15	11	0	67	Lancashire
802	Terry O'Neill	1972–73	1972–73	3	0	0	0	0	
235	Tom O'Neill	1913–14	1919–20	42	5	1	0	17	
350	Tom O'Neill	1930–31	1931–32	11	0	0	0	0	
439	Albert Ord	1937–38	1946–47	66	3	0	0	9	
385	Harold Ormshaw	1933–34	1934–35	7	4	0	0	12	
139	John Orrell	1903–04	1905–06	11	1	1	0	5	
307	Jimmy Osborne	1926–27	1933–34	175	36	0	0	108	
1358	Michael Ostick	2012	2013	54	5	0	0	20	
956	David O'Toole	1985–86	1990–91	11	0	0	0	0	
961	Ivor Owen	1986–87	1988–89	19	1	0	0	4	
1243	Nick Owen	2005	2005	9	1	11	0	26	
1407	Richard Owen	2016	2016	2	1	0	0	4	
617	Stan Owen	1951–52	1963–64	415	44	0	0	132	Great Britain
1437	Jack Owens	2018	2018	26	10	22	0	84	
1399	Mathias Pala	2015	2015	116	5	0	0	0	
347	Alf Pardon	1930–31	1930–31	5	0	0	0	0	
242	Billy Pardon	1918–19	1919–20	2	0	0	0	0	
275	George Parker	1921–22	1922–23	5	0	1	0	2	
225	Joe Parker	1912–13	1912–13	3	0	0	0	0	
1352	Rob Parker	2012	2013	40	6	0	0	24	
16	J. Parkes	1895–96	1895–96	7	0	0	0	0	
265	Billy Parkinson	1920–21	1923–24	65	9	5	0	37	
266	Jack Parkinson	1920–21	1928–29	16	3	0	0	9	
1097	Joe Parkinson	1995–96	1995–96	5	0	0	0	0	
1154	Chris Parr	1999	1999	6	1	0	0	4	
544	Eric Parr	1946–47	1949–50	50	2	0	0	6	
728	Jim Parr	1964–65	1965–66	44	4	0	0	12	
730	Geoff Parry	1964–65	1964–65	3	2	0	0	6	
443	Jim Parry	1937–38	1938–39	2	0	0	0	0	
424	Ken Parry	1936–37	1947–48	46	10	0	0	30	
1115	Safraz Patel	1996	2000	59	14	0	0	56	
1406	Cory Paterson	2016	present (as of 2019)	41	22	0	0	88	
1442	Larne Patrick	2018	2018	6	1	0	0	4	
1329	Robbie Paul	2010	2011	40	8	2	0	36	
806	Frank Paulger	1972–73	1972–73	5	0	0	0	0	
564	Charlie Pawsey	1947–48	1954–55	216	27	0	0	81	Great Britain
295	Alexander Pearson	1925–26	1925–26	7	0	0	0	0	
105	Billy Pearson	1900–01	1900–01	14	2	0	0	6	
51	Edgar Pearson	1897–98	1908–09	232	7	2	0	25	
98	William Peel	1900–01	1900–01	1	0	0	0	0	
1461	Sam Peet	2018	2018	3	1	0	0	4	
1422	Éloi Pélissier	2017	2017	24	0	0	0	0	
1268	Gareth Pemberton	2006	2007	16	0	0	0	0	
12	J. "Frosty" Pemberton	1895–96	1897–98	13	0	0	0	0	
1027	Gary Pendlebury	1991–92	1992–93	9	0	0	0	0	
484	H. Pendlebury	1939–40	1940–41	8	1	0	0	3	
515	Jimmy Pendlebury	1940–41	1946–47	16	0	23	0	46	
1041	John Pendlebury	1992–93	1993–94	55	6	0	1	25	
1370	Sean Penkywicz	2013	2015	71	22	0	0	88	
55	Harry Pennington	1897–98	1899–1900	8	0	0	0	0	
1214	Chris Percival	2004	2004	20	20	0	0	80	
1099	John Perigo	1995–96	1996	25	4	0	0	16	
983	Steve Peters	1987–88	1988–89	6	1	0	0	4	
790	Tony Peters	1971–72	1972–73	16	1	0	0	3	
852	Mick Phythian	1974–75	1976–77	5	3	0	0	9	
976	Harry Pinner	1987–88	1987–88	11	0	0	0	0	
410	Reuben Pitcher	1935–36	1938–39	41	2	0	0	6	
1383	Cameron Pitman	2013	2014	16	6	0	0	24	
988	Alan Platt	1988–89	1989–90	62	10	24	1	89	
875	Billy Platt	1978–79	1982–83	60	13	2	4	47	
1155	Chris Platt	1999	1999	1	0	0	0	0	
690	Don Platt	1960–61	1962–63	58	12	16	0	68	
1037	Duncan Platt	1992–93	1993–94	30	6	31	0	86	
827	Maurice Platt	1973–74	1977–78	50	7	1	0	23	
1392	Michael Platt	2014	2015	15	7	0	0	28	
193	Joe Porter	1909–10	1910–11	5	0	0	0	0	
1215	Dan Potter	2004	2004	27	13	0	0	52	
902	Ian Potter	1981–82	1991–92	152	16	0	0	51	Great Britain (Under-24s)
1303	Ryan Powell	2008	2008	4	0	0	0	0	
1346	Jonny Pownall	2011	present (as of 2019)	92	60	0	0	240	
1044	Gareth Pratt	1992–93	1994–95	34	4	0	0	16	
861	Alan Prescott	1976–77	1978–79	50	3	0	0	9	
313	Dicky Prescott	1926–27	1939–40	160	33	0	0	99	Lancashire
78	Fred Prescott	1898–99	1899–1900	2	0	0	0	0	
480	J. Prescott	1939–40	1939–40	2	0	0	0	0	
355	Jerry Prescott	1931–32	1931–32	2	0	0	0	0	
1272	Paul Prescott	2006	2006	7	0	0	0	0	
219	Peter Prescott	1912–13	1913–14	38	0	28	0	56	
289	Charlie Price	1924–25	1924–25	1	0	0	0	0	
257	Dai Price	1920–21	1920–21	17	0	0	0	0	
1188	Gareth Price	2002	2008	30	4	0	0	16	
79	John Price	1898–99	1898–99	1	0	0	0	0	
4	Sam Price	1895–96	1895–96	6	1	0	0	3	
255	Jack Prosser	1920–21	1921–22	49	4	0	0	12	
1120	Andy Pucill	1997	1999	75	6	0	0	24	
1042	Stuart Pugsley	1992–93	1993–94	26	3	0	0	12	
590	Yendle Pugsley	1949–50	1951–52	37	2	0	0	6	
1053	Dean Purtill	1993–94	1999	49	32	211	0	550	
1146	Kieron Purtill	1998	2002	85	18	0	1	73	
890	Derek Pyke	1979–80	1987–88	220	27	0	0	102	Lancashire
1111	Jonathan Quigley	1996	1996	19	8	0	0	32	
284	Jack Quinn	1923–24	1926–27	6	1	0	0	3	
501	Tom Quinn	1940–41	1940–41	11	0	0	0	0	
513	Bill Radcliffe	1940–41	1940–41	6	0	0	0	0	
84	Phil Radford	1899–1900	1899–1900	1	0	0	0	0	
913	Darren Ramsdale	1982–83	1986–87	19	0	0	0	0	
62	Jack Ramsdale	1897–98	1901–02	78	1	0	0	3	
814	John Randall	1973–74	1976–77	15	1	0	0	3	
860	Alan Rathbone	1976–77	1980–81	77	10	0	0	30	
1430	Nick Rawsthorne	2017	2017	1	1	0	0	4	
655	Tom Reakes	1955–56	1957–58	13	6	0	0	18	
1318	Sam Reay	2009	2009	12	5	0	0	20	
278	Osborne Rees	1922–23	1922–23	2	0	0	0	0	
1089	Bob Reeves	1994–95	1994–95	3	1	0	0	4	
914	Dave Regan	1982–83	1982–83	3	1	0	0	3	
1398	Ben Reynolds	2015	present (as of 2019)	76	28	205	1	523	
661	Brian Rhoden	1956–57	1957–58	4	0	0	0	0	
712	Austin Rhodes	1962–63	1964–65	80	9	51	0	129	
1433	Greg Richards	2017	2018	35	3	0	0	12	
445	Gwyn Richards	1938–39	1938–39	3	1	0	0	3	
1204	Sean Richardson	2003	2007	46	9	0	0	36	
304	Ted Richardson	1925–26	1936–37	200	11	0	0	33	
57	John Ridge	1897–98	1897–98	19	0	0	0	0	
798	Alan Riding	1972–73	1979–80	71	5	2	0	19	
953	Colin Riding	1985–86	1987–88	15	2	1	0	10	
30	… Ridyard	1895–96	1895–96	1	0	0	0	0	
344	John Ridyard	1930–31	1930–31	10	2	0	0	6	
1314	Martyn Ridyard	2009	present (as of 2019)	222	77	740	9	1797	
507	Jim Rigby	1940–41	1940–41	4	1	1	0	5	
659	Jim Rigby	1956–57	1957–58	7	0	0	0	0	
340	John Rigby	1929–30	1930–31	7	0	0	0	0	
505	Wallace Rigby	1940–41	1940–41	2	0	0	0	0	
1091	David Riley	1994–95	1995–96	2	0	0	0	0	
118	Jimmy Riley	1901–02	1903–04	31	2	0	0	6	
449	Peter Riley	1938–39	1951–52	245	30	0	0	90	Lancashire
509	Wilf Riley	1940–41	1940–41	1	1	0	0	3	
556	Albert Rimmer	1946–47	1947–48	6	0	0	0	0	
694	Bev Risman	1960–61	1965–66	140	31	241	0	575	
1207	Leroy Rivett	2003	2007	54	26	0	0	104	
69	Billy Roberts	1898–99	1905–06	234	1	0	0	3	
210	Billy Roberts	1911–12	1919–20	86	19	3	0	63	
234	Billy Roberts	1913–14	1914–15	5	0	1	0	2	
311	Fred Roberts	1926–27	1928–29	11	5	0	0	15	
24	Jimmy Roberts	1895–96	1898–99	64	3	0	0	9	
70	Jimmy Roberts	1898–99	1903–04	143	11	0	0	33	Lancashire
1301	Mark Roberts	2008	2008	21	1	0	0	4	
1261	Robert Roberts	2006	2007	29	5	10	0	40	
370	Tom Roberts	1932–33	1933–34	8	1	0	0	3	
453	Tom Roberts	1938–39	1938–39	10	0	0	0	0	
1048	Alan Robinshaw	1992–93	1993–94	4	0	0	0	0	
554	Bill Robinson	1946–47	1946–47	1	0	1	0	2	
634	Bill Robinson	1953–54	1967–68	395	26	0	0	78	Great Britain
252	Harry Robinson	1919–20	1922–23	6	5	0	0	15	
1102	Jeff Robinson	1995–96	1995–96	4	2	0	1	9	
970	Nigel Robinson	1986–87	1986–87	2	0	0	0	0	
1367	Alex Robson	2012	2012	2	0	0	0	0	
1175	Martin Roden	2001	2006	11	2	0	0	8	
1269	Neil Roden	2006	2006	4	0	0	0	0	
1032	Craig Rodgers	1991–92	1991–92	5	0	0	0	0	
117	J. Rogers	1901–02	1901–02	3	0	0	0	0	
993	Peter Ropati	1988–89	1990–91	83	19	0	0	76	
1186	Jon Roper	2002	2002	30	18	2	0	76	
158	Horace Roscoe	1905–06	1907–08	22	2	0	0	6	
431	Gerry Rothwell	1937–38	1937–38	7	0	0	0	0	
580	Vince Roughley	1948–49	1949–50	6	0	0	0	0	
967	Mick Round	1986–87	1991–92	49	22	0	0	88	
1320	Anthony Rourke	2009	2009	8	2	0	0	8	
1223	Gary Rourke	2004	2004	3	3	0	0	12	
1366	Chris Rowe	2012	2012	1	0	0	0	0	
537	Jimmy Rowe	1946–47	1950–51	156	35	2	0	109	Lancashire
744	Peter Rowe	1966–67	1966–67	6	1	0	0	3	
258	Stanley Rowe	1920–21	1920–21	14	1	0	0	3	
788	Allan Rowley	1971–72	1979–80	123	8	0	0	24	
1052	Paul Rowley	1992–93	2007	198	70	0	2	282	
1024	Andy Ruane	1991–92	1992–93	63	9	2	24	64	
978	David Ruane	1987–88	1992–93	148	78	0	1	313	
1282	Adam Rudd	2007	2009	33	6	0	0	24	
328	Harry Rudd	1928–29	1932–33	91	0	0	0	0	
1359	Matthew Russell	2012	2012	2	3	0	0	12	
436	Ces Ryan	1937–38	1950–51	111	12	0	0	36	
643	Martin Ryan	1954–55	1954–55	1	0	0	0	0	
460	Tommy Sale	1938–39	1948–49	82	16	2	0	52	
677	Bill Sanderson	1958–59	1961–62	35	2	0	0	6	
351	Joe Sanderson	1930–31	1931–32	5	1	0	0	3	
1184	Lee Sanderson	2001	2003	32	11	34	0	112	
1055	Mark Sarsfield	1993–94	1998	73	34	0	1	137	
1386	Matthew Sarsfield	2014	2015	31	12	0	0	48	
1017	Aaron Sawyer	1990–91	1990–91	10	0	0	0	0	
797	Cliff Sayer	1971–72	1977–78	149	25	0	0	75	
958	Ian Schubert	1986–87	1986–87	21	3	3	0	18	
893	Duncan Scott	1979–80	1980–81	21	1	37	1	78	
80	Jim Sephton	1898–99	1901–02	16	0	0	0	0	
494	… Sharrocks	1939–40	1939–40	1	0	0	0	0	
135	Tom Shaughnessy	1903–04	1907–08	35	0	0	0	0	
568	Charlie Shaw	1947–48	1947–48	8	1	0	0	3	
25	Jim Shaw	1895–96	1898–99	31	1	0	0	3	
1360	Ryan Shaw	2012	2012	3	3	1	0	14	
1009	Mark Sheals	1990–91	1991–92	58	10	0	0	40	
884	Mick Shepherd	1978–79	1978–79	4	1	0	0	3	
685	Bill Sheridan	1959–60	1960–61	11	3	0	0	9	
818	Mick Sherwood	1973–74	1973–74	1	0	0	0	0	
841	Jeff Shield	1974–75	1974–75	9	1	0	0	3	
740	Brian Shillinglaw	1966–67	1966–67	3	0	0	0	0	
46	Joe Short	1896–97	1899–1900	14	0	0	0	0	
7	Joe Shovelton	1895–96	1895–96	1	0	0	0	0	
36	Lennie Shovelton	1896–97	1896–97	1	0	0	0	0	
600	Ron Siddle	1949–50	1949–50	1	0	0	0	0	
141	Dick Silcock	1903–04	1905–06	80	2	0	0	6	
789	Barry Simpson	1971–72	1972–73	21	1	0	0	3	
541	Jack Simpson	1946–47	1947–48	39	7	0	0	21	
1365	Sam Singleton	2012	2012	1	0	0	0	0	
138	Pat Sinnott	1903–04	1904–05	5	2	0	0	6	
334	Harry Slater	1929–30	1929–30	14	6	0	0	18	
783	Peter Smethurst	1970–71	1972–73	89	3	1	0	11	
1298	Aaron Smith	2008	2009	38	7	0	0	28	
116	Billy Smith	1901–02	1909–10	111	46	0	0	138	
483	Billy Smith	1939–40	1939–40	3	0	0	0	0	
1133	Colin Smith	1997	1998	4	0	0	0	0	
1118	Dave Smith	1997	1998	20	0	0	0	0	
625	Derek Smith	1952–53	1953–54	14	1	0	0	3	
707	Graham Smith	1961–62	1966–67	61	6	14	0	46	
248	Harry Smith	1919–20	1919–20	8	0	0	0	0	
451	J. Smith	1938–39	1938–39	5	0	0	0	0	
1312	Jamie Smith	2008	2009	7	7	0	0	28	
343	John Smith	1929–30	1934–35	68	8	0	0	24	
1404	Lee Smith	2016	2016	23	12	36	0	120	
1338	Paul Smith	2010	2010	5	1	0	0	4	
647	Peter Smith	1954–55	1954–55	2	0	0	0	0	
525	Syd Smith	1940–41	1940–41	1	0	0	0	0	
8	Tom Smith	1895–96	1899–1900	66	0	1	0	2	
472	Tom Smith	1939–40	1940–41	17	0	0	0	0	
1224	Rob Smyth	2004	2007	40	12	19	0	86	
1265	Danny Speakman	2006	2007	17	3	0	0	12	
1357	Tom Spencer	2012	present (as of 2019)	99	14	0	0	56	
387	Charlie Spensley	1933–34	1935–36	39	8	0	0	24	
22	E. Spillane	1895–96	1897–98	80	13	0	0	39	
406	John Squires	1935–36	1935–36	19	2	0	0	6	
794	Mick Stacey	1971–72	1981–82	223	72	236	0	688	Lancashire
971	Wayne Standish	1987–88	1991–92	38	11	0	0	44	
1313	Nicky Stanton	2009	2010	31	10	3	0	46	
1239	Craig Stapleton	2005	2005	31	4	0	0	16	
1093	Ged Stazicker	1994–95	1996	33	6	0	0	24	
937	Gary Stephens	1984–85	1984–85	16	2	0	0	8	
579	Terry Stephens	1948–49	1950–51	49	0	0	0	0	
1005	David Stephenson	1989–90	1990–91	22	3	2	0	16	
1245	Warren Stevens	2005	2007	58	2	0	0	8	
409	Alec Stevenson	1935–36	1936–37	28	0	0	0	0	
1275	Anthony Stewart	2007	2009	61	8	0	0	32	
1421	Glenn Stewart	2017	2017	24	0	0	0	0	
538	Frank Stirrup	1946–47	1947–48	12	1	0	0	3	
169	Oliver Stirrup	1906–07	1907–08	4	1	0	0	3	
154	J. Stockley	1904–05	1904–05	2	0	0	0	0	
478	John Stoddart	1939–40	1939–40	3	0	0	0	0	
607	Arthur Stone	1950–51	1950–51	3	0	0	0	0	
175	Jim Stout	1907–08	1907–08	4	0	0	0	0	
130	Stephen Stout	1902–03	1902–03	3	0	0	0	0	
910	Gary Stradins	1982–83	1984–85	28	2	0	0	7	
989	Tim Street	1988–89	2001	249	35	4	0	148	Great Britain (Under-21s)
767	Harold Stringer	1968–69	1971–72	34	6	0	0	18	
364	Billy Stringman	1931–32	1936–37	150	48	0	0	144	
1226	Matthew Sturm	2004	2005	45	3	0	0	12	
1279	Mailangi Styles	2007	2007	24	3	0	0	12	
1014	Andy Sullivan	1990–91	1990–91	18	3	0	0	12	
1119	Chris Sullivan	1997	1997	2	1	0	0	4	
717	Frank Sullivan	1962–63	1962–63	4	0	0	0	0	
185	Charles Sutcliffe	1908–09	1908–09	1	1	0	0	3	
560	Vince Sutton	1946–47	1946–47	1	0	0	0	0	
1173	Simon Svabic	2001	2002	61	18	186	4	448	
882	Malcolm Swann	1978–79	1980–81	53	2	0	0	6	
1182	Willie Swann	2001	2004	98	32	0	0	128	
1262	Gary Sykes	2006	2006	25	8	0	0	32	
396	Harry Sykes	1934–35	1937–38	43	6	0	0	18	
892	Ray Tabern	1979–80	1986–87	195	32	0	0	115	Lancashire
596	Walt Tabern	1949–50	1962–63	370	39	0	0	117	Lancashire
1165	Graham Taberner	2000	2000	2	0	0	0	0	
729	Wally Tallis	1964–65	1965–66	6	0	2	0	4	
1035	Dave Tanner	1991–92	1994–95	41	11	25	0	94	
511	Abel Tatum	1940–41	1940–41	3	1	0	0	3	
372	Bill Taylor	1932–33	1934–35	7	2	0	0	6	
29	Bob Taylor	1895–96	1902–03	73	1	0	0	3	
932	David Taylor	1984–85	1985–86	28	13	0	0	52	
517	Jack Taylor	1940–41	1940–41	6	0	0	0	0	
1242	James Taylor	2005	2013	183	24	0	0	96	
109	Joe Taylor	1901–02	1901–02	5	0	1	0	2	
854	John Taylor	1975–76	1979–80	163	43	0	0	129	
863	Kevin Taylor	1976–77	1979–80	108	10	0	0	30	
13	Peter Taylor	1895–96	1900–01	126	5	0	0	15	Lancashire
263	Reg Taylor	1920–21	1924–25	84	45	0	0	135	
1379	Scott Taylor	2013	2013	2	1	0	0	4	
6	Tommy Taylor	1895–96	1896–97	47	9	0	0	27	
623	Oliver Teggin	1951–52	1953–54	10	1	0	0	3	
1286	Adam Thomas	2007	2008	12	3	0	0	12	
254	Emlyn Thomas	1920–21	1925–26	200	26	2	0	82	
285	Harry Thomas	1923–24	1927–28	94	47	0	0	141	
933	Mark Thomas	1984–85	1987–88	26	0	0	0	0	
1440	Bodene Thompson	2018	2018	24	4	0	0	16	
1428	Dave Thompson	2017	2017	1	0	0	0	0	
816	Gordon Thompson	1973–74	1973–74	3	0	0	0	0	
1441	Jordan Thompson	2018	present (as of 2019)	26	1	0	0	4	
417	Tommy "Tubby" Thompson	1936–37	1937–38	46	12	18	0	72	
1344	Andrew Thornley	2011	present (as of 2019)	73	11	0	0	44	
1384	Iain Thornley	2013	present (as of 2019)	1	0	0	0	0	
147	Jim Threlfall	1904–05	1905–06	12	0	0	0	0	
1417	Danny Tickle	2016	2017	38	4	0	0	16	
715	Rod Tickle	1962–63	1972–73	284	114	0	0	342	Great Britain (Under-24s)
321	Bill Tobin	1927–28	1928–29	6	0	0	0	0	
585	Jackie Tobin	1948–49	1948–49	1	0	1	0	2	
183	James Tobin	1908–09	1909–10	7	0	0	0	0	
545	Harry Todd	1946–47	1948–49	35	7	1	0	23	
332	Tommy Tolan	1928–29	1932–33	72	24	0	0	72	
900	Steve Tomlinson	1981–82	1983–84	44	6	70	0	158	
1411	Willie Tonga	2016	2017	9	1	0	0	4	
876	Alan Tonks	1978–79	1978–79	12	0	0	0	0	
663	Edward Toohey	1956–57	1956–57	25	3	0	0	9	
1008	Paul Topping	1990–91	1991–92	60	34	84	9	313	
232	Robert "Flop" Topping	1913–14	1913–14	1	0	0	0	0	
87	Harry Towers	1899–1900	1906–07	62	5	25	0	65	
92	J. H. Towers	1899–1900	1899–1900	1	0	0	0	0	
454	Bill Townson	1938–39	1938–39	4	0	0	0	0	
299	Edward Trantum	1925–26	1926–27	13	0	14	0	28	
67	Richard Treasure	1898–99	1898–99	6	0	0	0	0	
1090	Hamoni Tuavao	1994–95	1995–96	11	1	0	0	4	
977	Paddy Tuimavave	1987–88	1987–88	6	1	0	0	4	
1172	Neil Turley	2001	2005	124	132	488	15	1519	England (Under-21s)
426	Donald Turner	1936–37	1936–37	1	0	0	0	0	
708	Colin Tyrer	1962–63	1966–67	112	16	206	0	460	Great Britain (Under-24s), Lancashire
495	J. Tyrer	1939–40	1939–40	1	0	0	0	0	
143	Tom Underwood	1903–04	1903–04	5	1	0	0	3	
37	… Unknown1	1896–97	1896–97	1	0	0	0	0	
91	… Unknown2	1899–1900	1899–1900	1	0	0	0	0	
300	… Unknown3	1925–26	1925–26	1	0	1	0	2	
320	… Unknown4	1927–28	1927–28	2	1	0	0	3	
411	… Unknown5	1935–36	1935–36	7	3	0	0	9	
414	… Unknown6	1935–36	1935–36	1	0	0	0	0	
566	… Unknown7	1947–48	1947–48	1	0	0	0	0	
764	… Unknown8	1968–69	1968–69	1	0	0	0	0	
845	… Unknown9	1974–75	1974–75	1	0	0	0	0	
846	… Unknown10	1974–75	1974–75	1	0	0	0	0	
293	Alf Unsworth	1924–25	1933–34	108	12	18	0	72	
157	Billy Unsworth	1905–06	1905–06	5	2	0	0	6	
94	H. Unsworth	1899–1900	1899–1900	1	0	0	0	0	
101	Joe Unsworth	1900–01	1900–01	2	0	0	0	0	
86	Tom Unsworth	1899–1900	1899–1900	1	0	0	0	0	
349	Vince Unsworth	1930–31	1930–31	11	0	2	0	4	
1439	Paterika Vaivai	2018	2018	9	0	0	0	0	
1016	Peter Valentine	1990–91	1991–92	3	0	0	0	0	
597	Austin Vallet	1949–50	1949–50	1	0	0	0	0	
935	Gary Van Bellen	1984–85	1984–85	14	0	0	0	0	
314	Adrian Van Heerden	1927–28	1927–28	14	2	0	0	6	
1169	Richard Varkulis	2000	2000	2	0	0	0	0	
326	Bill Varley	1928–29	1928–29	3	0	0	0	0	
920	Shane Varley	1983–84	1983–84	23	3	0	0	12	
1423	Atelea Vea	2017	2017	27	7	0	0	28	
1105	Jimmy Veikoso	1995–96	1997	42	23	2	0	96	
398	Albert Wade	1934–35	1934–35	1	0	0	0	0	
441	Jack Wade	1937–38	1939–40	56	0	56	0	112	
532	… Wadeson	1940–41	1940–41	1	0	0	0	0	
1300	Mike Wainwright	2008	2008	17	4	0	0	16	
952	Gary Walkden	1985–86	1986–87	4	0	0	0	0	
632	Alan Walker	1953–54	1953–54	9	2	0	0	6	
339	George Walker	1929–30	1929–30	1	0	0	0	0	
458	Jim Walker	1938–39	1940–41	29	1	0	0	3	
1393	Jonathan "Jonny" Walker	2014	2015	8	1	0	0	4	
866	Les Wall	1976–77	1980–81	21	1	0	0	3	
931	Tony Waller	1983–84	1983–84	1	0	0	0	0	
2	Alf Wallwork	1895–96	1897–98	62	9	0	0	27	
699	Stan Walmsley	1961–62	1970–71	82	7	6	0	33	
1456	Adam Walne	2018	2018	8	0	0	0	0	
1458	Jordan Walne	2018	2018	8	3	0	0	12	
735	Joseph "Joe" Walsh	1965–66	1977–78	353	128	0	0	384	Great Britain
383	Tom "Tot" Walsh	1933–34	1934–35	67	16	43	0	134	
826	Eric Walton	1973–74	1973–74	1	0	0	0	0	
1061	Steve Warburton	1993–94	1993–94	8	2	0	0	8	
760	Tom Warburton	1967–68	1969–70	68	18	83	0	220	
53	George Ward	1897–98	1897–98	2	0	0	0	0	
551	George Ward	1946–47	1946–47	1	2	0	0	6	
1364	Josh Ward	2012	2012	1	0	0	0	0	
1171	Simon Warhurst	2000	2000	1	0	0	0	0	
1022	Keith Waterworth	1990–91	1990–91	2	0	0	0	0	
322	Tom Waterworth	1927–28	1933–34	27	1	0	0	3	
859	Steve Watmore	1976–77	1976–77	1	0	0	0	0	
1296	Ian Watson	2008	2009	52	13	62	4	180	
766	Derek Watts	1968–69	1971–72	113	14	0	0	42	
765	Eric Watts	1968–69	1968–69	1	0	0	0	0	
1180	Michael Watts	2001	2003	39	11	0	0	44	
1094	Jerome Weall	1994–95	1995–96	2	0	0	0	0	
984	Carl Webb	1987–88	1988–89	7	0	0	0	0	
1066	Dave Webster	1993–94	1994–95	13	1	0	0	4	
90	Wilfrid Webster	1899–1900	1909–10	204	9	0	0	27	
1205	Pat Weisner	2003	2003	33	10	25	3	93	
724	Bob Welding	1963–64	1969–70	159	15	0	0	45	Lancashire
473	Joe Welsby	1939–40	1939–40	19	0	0	0	0	
427	Cecil West	1936–37	1937–38	13	1	0	0	3	
912	John Westhead	1982–83	1990–91	136	25	0	0	100	Great Britain (Under-21s)
1229	Craig Weston	2004	2004	4	0	0	0	0	
1401	Dayne Weston	2016	2017	43	7	0	0	28	
238	Abe "Laddie" Whalley	1914–15	1920–21	45	2	17	0	40	
448	Billy Whalley	1938–39	1940–41	3	0	2	0	4	
676	Jim Wharton	1958–59	1966–67	69	7	0	0	21	
583	Reg Wheatley	1948–49	1950–51	30	3	0	0	9	
837	Don Wheeler	1973–74	1975–76	17	0	0	0	0	
1462	Bradley Whelan	2018	2018	3	1	0	0	4	
828	Ken White	1973–74	1973–74	1	0	0	0	0	
1405	Richard Whiting	2016	2016	15	2	0	0	8	
144	Sam Whittaker	1903–04	1912–13	193	24	4	0	80	
1145	Dave Whittle	1998	2002	128	17	0	0	68	Wales
319	Fred Whittle	1927–28	1929–30	4	0	0	0	0	
850	John Whittle	1974–75	1975–76	19	6	0	0	18	
759	Alf Whitworth	1967–68	1971–72	36	1	0	0	3	
1217	Oliver Wilkes	2004	2015	99	17	0	0	68	
811	Alf Wilkinson	1972–73	1984–85	243	35	0	0	111	Great Britain (Under-24s)
1092	Chris Wilkinson	1994–95	1998	50	8	142	18	334	
329	W. A. Williams	1928–29	1928–29	2	1	0	0	3	
763	Colin Wills	1967–68	1967–68	1	0	0	0	0	
851	John Wills	1974–75	1974–75	1	0	0	0	0	
1231	John Wilshere	2005	2005	29	10	8	0	56	
653	Bobby Wilson	1955–56	1955–56	1	1	0	0	3	
1085	Christian Wilson	1994–95	1995–96	22	4	0	0	16	
1267	Dana Wilson	2006	2007	47	8	0	0	32	
381	John "Durdock" Wilson	1933–34	1933–34	5	1	0	0	3	
1156	Craig Wingfield	1999	1999	4	0	0	0	0	
1316	Lee Wingfield	2009	2009	11	2	0	0	8	
1143	Paul Wingfield	1998	2000	69	17	234	1	537	
425	Jack Winnard	1936–37	1936–37	4	0	0	0	0	
423	Tom Winnard	1936–37	1940–41	89	14	0	0	42	
749	Charlie Winslade	1966–67	1966–67	7	0	0	0	0	
595	Arthur Winstanley	1949–50	1950–51	18	0	3	0	6	
149	Billy Winstanley	1904–05	1905–06	39	0	0	0	0	
151	Billy Winstanley	1904–05	1910–11	171	19	0	0	57	Great Britain
889	Chris Winstanley	1979–80	1979–80	1	0	0	0	0	
419	George Winstanley	1936–37	1937–38	9	0	9	0	18	
233	Jim Winstanley	1913–14	1929–30	293	9	24	0	75	
89	Joe Winstanley	1899–1900	1899–1900	5	0	0	0	0	
190	Joe Winstanley	1909–10	1911–12	6	1	0	0	3	
72	John "Soap" Winstanley	1898–99	1900–01	37	0	0	0	0	
1056	Paul Winstanley	1993–94	1994–95	12	0	0	0	0	
39	W. H. Winstanley	1896–97	1897–98	4	0	0	0	0	
297	Billy Wood	1925–26	1930–31	164	32	0	0	96	Lancashire
572	Harry Wood	1947–48	1947–48	9	0	0	0	0	
557	Jack Wood	1946–47	1953–54	102	78	37	0	308	
844	Joe Wood	1974–75	1974–75	1	0	0	0	0	
65	John Wood	1897–98	1897–98	1	0	0	0	0	
1292	Tom Woodcock	2007	2008	5	1	0	0	4	
524	Victor Woodend	1940–41	1940–41	2	0	0	0	0	
302	Albert Woods	1925–26	1925–26	1	0	0	0	0	
469	Harry Woods	1939–40	1946–47	28	2	0	0	6	
164	Herbert Woods	1906–07	1913–14	173	1	0	0	3	
858	John Woods	1976–77	1992–93	349	152	984	13	2492	Great Britain
519	P. Woods	1940–41	1940–41	1	0	0	0	0	
470	Sammy Woods	1939–40	1947–48	9	1	0	0	3	
224	Tom Woods	1912–13	1919–20	17	1	2	0	7	
111	Billy Woodward	1901–02	1901–02	7	0	0	0	0	
108	George Woodward	1901–02	1901–02	19	0	0	0	0	
181	Harry Woodward	1908–09	1908–09	10	0	1	0	2	
305	R. Woodward	1925–26	1925–26	1	0	0	0	0	
739	Eric Woodyer	1965–66	1965–66	3	0	0	0	0	
502	A. Woolley	1940–41	1940–41	3	0	0	0	0	
867	Graham Worgan	1976–77	1984–85	90	19	0	0	61	
249	Albert Worrall	1919–20	1937–38	503	46	0	0	138	England
374	Tom Worrall	1932–33	1933–34	2	0	0	0	0	
1356	Michael Worrincy	2012	2012	7	3	0	0	12	
1394	Greg Worthington	2015	2016	41	17	0	0	68	
689	Billy Wright	1959–60	1959–60	1	0	0	0	0	
1070	David Wright	1993–94	1996	31	2	0	0	8	
582	George Wright	1948–49	1951–52	42	3	0	0	9	
488	Jim Wyatt	1939–40	1940–41	8	1	0	0	3	
1087	Steve Wynne	1994–95	1995–96	17	7	0	0	28	
359	Bill Yates	1931–32	1932–33	17	3	0	0	9	
217	Harry Yates	1912–13	1914–15	8	2	0	0	6	
518	Joe Yates	1940–41	1940–41	5	0	0	0	0	
864	Mal Yates	1976–77	1980–81	65	3	8	1	26	
270	Jack Yorke	1920–21	1922–23	40	2	0	0	6	

=== Players earning international caps while at Leigh ===
- Trevor Allan won caps for Other Nationalities while at Leigh circa-1952 ?-caps won caps for British Empire XIII while at Leigh circa-1952 ?-caps
- Kevin Ashcroft won caps for Great Britain while at Leigh 1968 Australia France, 1969 France, 1970 France, New Zealand, 1974 New Zealand (sub) (World Cup 1968 1-cap, 1970 2-caps)
- Benjamin John "Jackie" Bowen won caps for Wales while at Wigan, and Leigh 1945–48 2-caps
- Jeffrey "Jeff" Burke (#12) won caps for Other Nationalities while at Leigh circa-1951 ?-caps
- Joseph "Joe" Cartwright won caps for England while at Leigh 1921 Wales, Other Nationalities, Australia, 1922 Wales, 1923 Wales (2 matches), and won caps for Great Britain while at Leigh 1920 Australia, New Zealand (3 matches), 1921–22 Australia (3 matches)
- David Chisnall won caps for England while at Warrington 1975 Wales (sub), France, Wales, New Zealand, Papua New Guinea, and won caps for Great Britain while at Leigh 1970 Australia, New Zealand (World Cup 1970 1-cap)
- Thomas "Tom" Clarkson won caps for England while at Leigh 1921 Australia, 1922 Wales, 1923 Wales
- Thomas "Tom" Coop, won a cap for England (RU) while at Leigh in 1892 against Scotland
- Joseph "Joe" Darwell won caps for England while at Leigh in 1922 against Wales, and in 1923 against Wales (2 matches), and won caps for Great Britain while at Leigh in 1924 against Australia (3 matches), and New Zealand (2 matches)
- Malcolm Davies won caps for Wales while at Leigh, and Bradford Northern 1953–1959 2-caps
- Steve Donlan won caps for England while at Leigh 1984 Wales, and won caps for Great Britain while at Leigh 1984 New Zealand, Papua New Guinea
- Desmond "Des" Drummond won caps for England while at Leigh 1980 Wales, France, 1981 France, Wales, 1984 Wales, and won caps for Great Britain while at Leigh 1980 New Zealand (2 matches), 1981 France (2 matches), 1982 Australia (3 matches), 1983 France (2 matches), 1984 France, Australia (3 matches), New Zealand (3 matches), Papua New Guinea, 1985 New Zealand (3 matches), 1986 France (2 matches), while at Warrington 1987 Papua New Guinea, 1988 France
- Joe Egan won caps for England while at Wigan 1943 Wales, 1944 Wales, 1945 Wales (2 matches), 1946 France (2 matches), Wales (2 matches), 1947 France (2 matches), Wales (2 matches), 1948 France (2 matches), Wales, 1949 Wales, France, Other Nationalities, 1950 Wales, while at Leigh Wales, France, and won caps for Great Britain while at Wigan 1946 Australia (3 matches), 1947 New Zealand (3 matches), 1948 Australia (3 matches), 1950 Australia (3 matches), New Zealand (2 matches)
- Wyndham Emery won a cap for Wales while at Leigh 1922 1-cap
- Stuart Ferguson won a cap for Wales while at Leigh 1970 1-cap 2-goals 4-points
- Peter Foster won caps for Great Britain while at Leigh in 1955 against New Zealand (3 matches), and also represented Great Britain while at Leigh between 1952 and 1956 against France (1 non-Test match)
- Frederick "Fred" Harris won caps for England while at Leigh 1934 Australia, while at Leeds 1937 France
- Adam Hughes won caps for Wales while at Widnes Vikings, Leigh, and Oldham R.L.F.C. 2002–2007 13(11?)-caps 9-tries 3-goals 42-points
- Christopher "Chris" Johnson won a cap for Great Britain while at Leigh in 1985 against France
- Clive Jones won caps for Wales while at Leigh in the 1975 Rugby League World Cup against New Zealand, and France (World Cup 1975 2-caps)
- Edward "Ted" Kerwick won caps for England while at Leigh 1949 Other Nationalities
- Frank Kitchen won caps for Great Britain while at Leigh (World Cup 1954 2-caps, 3-tries)
- James "Jimmy" Ledgard won caps for England while at Dewsbury 1947 France (2 matches), Wales, while at Leigh 1948 Wales, 1949 France, Other Nationalities, 1951 Wales, France, 1952 Other Nationalities (2 matches), Wales, 1953 Wales, 1955 Other Nationalities, and won caps for Great Britain while at Dewsbury 1947 New Zealand (2 matches), while at Leigh 1948 Australia, 1950 Australia (2 matches), New Zealand, 1951 New Zealand, 1954 France (2 matches), Australia, New Zealand (World Cup 1954 4-caps, 1-try, 13-goals)
- Gordon Lewis won a cap for Wales while at Leigh in 1970 against England, and won a cap for Great Britain while at Leigh in 1965 against New Zealand
- Tauʻalupe Liku won caps for Tonga while at Leigh 1995 ?-caps
- Michael "Mick" Martyn won caps for Great Britain while at Leigh in 1958 against Australia, and in 1959 against Australia
- Walter Mooney won caps for Great Britain while at Leigh in 1924 against New Zealand (2 matches)
- Tony Heaton won 3 caps for Scotland, The first 2 were as a Student in the 1995 Emerging Nations World Cup and the 3rd while at Leigh in 1996 against Ireland
- Mark Moran won caps for Wales while at Leigh 1992 2-caps (sub)
- Christopher "Chris" Morley won caps for Wales while at St. Helens in 1996 against France (sub), and England, while at Salford City Reds in 1999 against Ireland, and Scotland, while at Sheffield Eagles in 2000 against South Africa (sub), while at Leigh in the 2000 Rugby League World Cup against Lebanon (sub), New Zealand, Papua New Guinea (sub), and Australia, while at Oldham R.L.F.C. in 2001 against England, while at Halifax in 2003 against Russia, and Australia, while at Swinton Lions in 2006 against Scotland, 1996–2006 13(14?)-caps + 4-caps (sub) 1(2?)-try 4(8?)-points
- Alex Murphy (Warrington) won caps for England while at Leigh 1969 Wales, France, and won caps for Great Britain while at St. Helens 1958 Australia (3 matches), New Zealand, 1959 France (2 matches), Australia, 1960 New Zealand, France, Australia, France, 1961 France, New Zealand (3 matches), 1962 France, Australia (3 matches), 1963 Australia (2 matches), 1964 France, 1965 France, New Zealand, 1966 France (2 matches), while at Warrington 1971 New Zealand (World Cup 1960 3-caps, 1-try)
- Stanley "Stan" Owen won a cap for Great Britain while at Leigh in 1958 against France, and represented Wales while at Leigh in 1955 against France, and in 1963 against France
- Charles "Charlie" Pawsey won caps for England while at Leigh 1951 Wales, 1952 Other Nationalities (2 matches), Wales, 1953 France (2 matches), Wales, Other Nationalities, and won caps for Great Britain while at Leigh 1952 Australia (3 matches), 1954 Australia (2 matches), New Zealand (2 matches)
- Gareth Price won caps for Wales while at St. Helens, Leigh, Rochdale Hornets, and Celtic Crusaders 1999–present 2(9, 10?)-caps + 9-caps (sub) 1-try 4-points
- Rob Roberts won caps for Wales while at Huddersfield Giants, unattached, Leigh, and Oldham R.L.F.C. 2002–present 6(7, 8?)-caps + 2-caps (sub) 2-tries 8-points
- William "Bill" Robinson won caps for Great Britain while at Leigh in 1963 against France, and Australia
- Dick Silcock won caps for England while at Leigh 1906 Other Nationalities, and won caps for Great Britain while at Wigan 1909 Australia
- Raymond "Ray" Tabern won caps for Great Britain while at Leigh in 1982 against France
- Joseph "Joe" Walsh won caps for Great Britain while at Leigh in 1971 against New Zealand
- Ian Watson won caps for Wales while at Salford City Reds, Swinton Lions, Widnes Vikings, Rochdale Hornets, Oldham R.L.F.C., and Leigh 1996–present 19(17?)-caps + 3-caps (sub) 3(4?)-tries 1-goal 14(18?)-points
- David "Dave" Whittle won caps for Wales while at Leigh 2000–2002 5(6?)-caps + 1-cap (sub)
- William "Billy" Winstanley won caps for England while at Leigh 1910 Wales, while at Wigan 1911 Wales, Australia, 1912 Wales, and won caps for Great Britain while at Leigh 1910 Australia, New Zealand, while at Wigan 1911–12 Australia (3 matches)
- John Wood won caps for Great Britain while at Leigh 1982 France
- John Woods won caps for England while at Leigh 1979 Wales (sub), France, 1980 Wales (sub), France, 1981 France, Wales, Wales (sub), and won caps for Great Britain while at Leigh 1979 Australia (3 matches), New Zealand, 1980 New Zealand, 1981 France (2 matches), 1982 Australia, Australia, 1983 France, while at Warrington 1987 Papua New Guinea
- Albert Worrall won caps for England while at Leigh 1934 Australia

=== Other notable players ===
These players have either; received a testimonial match, are "Hall of Fame" inductees, played during Leigh Centurions' Super League season, or were international representatives before, or after, their time at Leigh.

- Albert Ashton circa-1940 (Father of Brian Ashton)
- Ken Baxter
- Owen 'Ozzy' Bevan (brother of Brian Bevan)
- Mick Bolewski, the first player from the Australian state of Queensland to sign with a British club.
- Mathew Bottom circa-2005
- Edward "Ted" Brophy circa-1962
- Liam Coleman circa-2005
- Mick Collins Centre 408-games 1970–71 Challenge Cup winner
- Benjamin "Ben" Cooper circa-2005
- Jason Duffy circa-2005
- John Duffy circa-2005
- Dominic Feau'nati circa-2005
- Jason Ferris circa-2005
- Dai Fitzgerald
- Darren Fleary circa-2005
- Carl Forber circa-2005
- Michael "Mike" Govin circa-2005
- Danny Halliwell circa-2005
- Kevin Henderson circa-2005
- Christopher "Chris" Hill circa-2005
- Michael "Mick" Hogan (#1)
- Rob Jackson circa-2005
- Chris Jones circa-2005
- Philip "Phil" Jones circa-2005
- Jason Kent circa-2005
- James King circa-2005
- Ian Knott circa-2005
- Mark Leafa circa-2005
- Steve McCurrie circa-2005
- Keiron Maddocks circa-2005
- Stephen "Steve" Maden circa-2005
- Richard Marshall circa-2005
- Robert Mears circa-2005
- Fui Fui Moi Moi
- Richard Moore circa-2005
- Rex Mossop 1952–55
- Nicholas "Nick" Owen circa-2005
- McDonald Bailey 1953
- Bev Risman circa-1963/64
- Paul Rowley circa-2005
- Rob Smyth circa-2005
- Michael "Mick" Stacey (Testimonial match 1982)
- Craig Stapleton circa-2005
- Warren Stevens circa-2005
- Matthew "Matt" Sturm circa-2005
- James "Jimmy" Taylor circa-2005
- Rod Tickle Wing 114-Tries
- Neil Turley circa-2005
- Colin Tyrer circa-1965
- Oliver Wilkes circa-2005
- John Wilshere circa-2005
