= Tabern =

Tabern is a surname. Notable people with the surname include:

- Alan Tabern (born 1966), English darts player
- Ray Tabern (born 1953), English rugby player
