= Clive Jones =

Clive Jones may refer to:

- Clive Jones (Doctor Who), a character on the British TV series Doctor Who
- Clive Jones (politician), British Liberal Democrat politician and MP for Wokingham
- Clive Jones (rugby), Welsh rugby union and rugby league footballer of the 1970s
