= Mike Wainwright =

Scotland international rugby league footballer

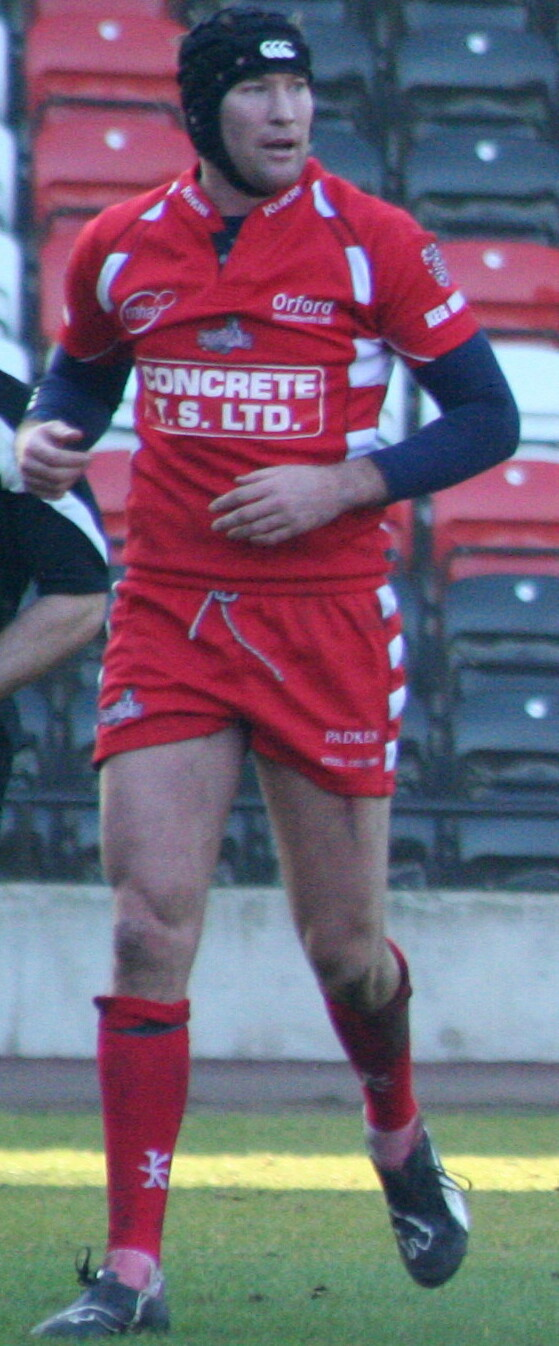

Personal information
- Full name: Michael Wainwright
- Born: 25 February 1975 (age 51) Warrington, Cheshire, England

Playing information
- Height: 6 ft 4 in (1.93 m)
- Weight: 15 st 6 lb (98 kg)
- Position: Second-row
Club
Years	Team	Pld	T	G	FG	P
1994–99	Warrington	79+23	16	0	0	64
2000–02	Salford City Reds	80	9	0	0	36
2003–07	Warrington	123+4	14	0	0	56
2007	Salford City Reds	3	0	0	0	0
2008	Leigh Centurions	17	4	0	0	16
2009	Swinton Lions	1	0	0	0	0
	Total	330	43	0	0	172
Representative
Years	Team	Pld	T	G	FG	P
1998–2005	Scotland	5	1	0	0	4

Mike Wainwright (born 25 February 1975) is a former Scotland international rugby league footballer who played in the second-row. He played for the Salford City Reds and the Warrington Wolves in the Super League, the Leigh Centurions (Heritage No. 1300) in the RFL Championship and for the Swinton Lions in National League Two.

== Background ==
Wainwright was born in Warrington, Cheshire, England.

== Career ==
He has previously played in the Super League for the Warrington Wolves, the Salford City Reds and the Leigh Centurions.

Played for Woolston Rovers before joining Warrington's Academy, he was a halfback as a junior and played stand-off in the 1993 Academy Cup Final victory, before switching to back row. He left the Warrington Wolves at the end of the 1999 Super League season to join the Salford City Reds. He re-joined Warrington ahead of the 2003 Super League season.

Following his career in rugby, Mike moved into financial services and is currently working as 'Head of Partnerships' for AFEX based in Manchester.

== International ==
Wainwright toured Australia with the Great Britain Academy team in 1994. He was named in England's 40-man training squad in preparation for the 1995 Rugby League World Cup, but was not included in the final squad.

Wainwright later chose to represent Scotland, and was selected for the 2000 World Cup.
