= Simon Svabic =

English rugby league footballer

Personal information
- Full name: Simon Svabic
- Born: 18 January 1980 (age 46) England

Playing information
- Position: Wing, Stand-off, Loose forward
Club
Years	Team	Pld	T	G	FG	P
1998–00	Salford	0	0	0	0	0
2001–02	Leigh Centurions	61	18	186	4	448
2003–06	Oldham RLFC	95	20	116	4	316
2007	Rochdale Hornets	0	0	0	0	0
	Blackpool Panthers	0	0	0	0	0
	Total	156	38	302	8	764
- As of 30 June 2021

Simon Svabic (born 18 January 1980) is a Serbian-British former professional rugby league footballer.

He used to play for Salford, Leigh Centurions, Oldham RLFC, Rochdale Hornets and the Blackpool Panthers in the Championship One, usually as a goal-kicking stand-off.
