= Thomas Coop =

English dual-code rugby footballer (1863–1929)

Tom Coop
Personal information
- Full name: Thomas Coop
- Born: 10 March 1863 Tottington, England
- Died: 16 April 1929 (aged 66) Bucklow, England

Playing information

Rugby union
- Position: Fullback
Club
Years	Team	Pld	T	G	FG	P
≤1892–95	Leigh
Representative
Years	Team	Pld	T	G	FG	P
1892	England	1	0	0	0	0

Rugby league
- Position: Fullback
Club
Years	Team	Pld	T	G	FG	P
1895–97	Leigh	85				104
Representative
Years	Team	Pld	T	G	FG	P
1896–97	Lancashire	3	0	0	0	0

Thomas Coop (10 March 1863 – 16 April 1929) was an English rugby union, and professional rugby league footballer who played in the 1890s. He played representative level rugby union (RU) for England, and at club level for Leigh, as a fullback and representative level rugby League (RL) for Lancashire, and at club level for Leigh, as a goal-kicking fullback. Prior to Thursday 29 August 1895, Leigh was a rugby union club.

== Background ==
Tom Coop was born in Tottington, Lancashire, England, and he died aged 66 in Bucklow, Cheshire, England.

== Playing career ==
=== Representative honours ===
Coop won a cap for England (RU) while at Leigh in the 1892 Home Nations Championship against Scotland.

Coop won caps for Lancashire (RL) while at Leigh.

=== Change of Code ===
When Leigh converted from the rugby union code to the rugby league code on Thursday 29 August 1895, Tom Coop would have been 32 years of age. Consequently, he was both a rugby union, and rugby league footballer for Leigh, and he played his last match for Leigh in the 8-11 defeat by Stockport at Mather Lane (adjacent to the Bridgewater Canal), Leigh, on Saturday 4 December 1897.
