= Craig Briscoe =

English rugby league footballer

Personal information
- Full name: Craig Briscoe
- Born: 8 December 1992 (age 33) Wigan, England

Playing information
- Position: Second-row
Club
| Years | Team | Pld | T | G | FG | P |
|---|---|---|---|---|---|---|
| 2010–13 | Leigh Centurions | 51 | 8 | 1 | 0 | 34 |
| 2014–15 | Barrow Raiders | 35 | 8 | 0 | 0 | 32 |
| 2016–18 | Oldham | 31 | 8 | 0 | 0 | 32 |
| | Total | 117 | 24 | 1 | 0 | 98 |
- Source: As of 5 July 2021

Craig Briscoe (born 8 December 1992) is an English professional rugby league footballer who last played for Oldham in League 1.

Briscoe played his junior rugby for Wigan St. Judes ARLFC before joining Leigh's academy side before the 2010 season, going on to make his first team début that season in a fixture away to Batley. He made four further appearances during 2011 and is looking to establish himself in the Leigh first team during 2012. Craig is also the cousin of Widnes player Shaun Briscoe.

He has previously played in the Co-Operative Championship for the Leigh Centurions.
