= James King (rugby league) =

Ireland international rugby league footballer

Personal information
- Full name: James King
- Born: 12 December 1980 (age 44)

Playing information
- Position: Second-row
Club
Years	Team	Pld	T	G	FG	P
2003	Barrow Raiders
2005	Leigh Centurions	14	2	0	0	8
	Total	14	2	0	0	8
Representative
Years	Team	Pld	T	G	FG	P
2003	Ireland	2	2	0	0	8
- Source: As of 16 May 2012

James King is a professional rugby league footballer who played in the 2000s. He played at representative level for Ireland, and at club level for Barrow Raiders and Leigh Centurions, as a second-row.

== International honours ==
James King won caps for Ireland while at Barrow Raiders 2003 2-caps.
