= Mark Moran (rugby league) =

English rugby league footballer

Personal information
- Full name: Mark Moran
- Born: 15 October 1964
- Died: 18 February 2024 (aged 59)

Playing information
- Position: Wing, Hooker
Club
Years	Team	Pld	T	G	FG	P
1986–92	Salford	82	4	0	0	16
1992–93	Leigh	5	0	0	0	0
≤2001–≥01	Woolston Rovers
	Total	87	4	0	0	16
Representative
Years	Team	Pld	T	G	FG	P
1992	Wales	2	0	0	0	0

Mark Moran (15 October 1964 – 18 February 2024) was a professional rugby league footballer who played in the 1980s, 1990s, and 2000s. He played at representative level for Wales, and at club level for Salford, Leigh and Woolston Rovers (in Warrington), as a wing or hooker.

== Playing career ==
=== International honours ===
Mark Moran won two caps for Wales in 1992 while playing for Leigh, appearing as an interchange/substitute.

=== County Cup Final appearances ===
Mark Moran played as a hooker in Salford's 17–22 defeat by Wigan in the 1988 Lancashire Cup Final on 23 October 1988 at Knowsley Road, St. Helens.
