= Steve Maden =

English rugby league footballer

Personal information
- Full name: Stephen Maden
- Born: 13 September 1982 (age 42); Ashton-in-Makerfield, England

Playing information
- Position: Fullback, Wing, Centre
Club
| Years | Team | Pld | T | G | FG | P |
|---|---|---|---|---|---|---|
| 2002 | Warrington Wolves | 4 | 0 | 0 | 0 | 0 |
| 2002–03 | St. Helens | 2 | 0 | 0 | 0 | 4 |
| 2004–05 | Leigh Centurions | 44 | 0 | 0 | 0 | 60 |
| 2006–07 | Whitehaven | 54 | 0 | 0 | 0 | 100 |
| 2008–14 | Leigh Centurions | 167 | 0 | 0 | 0 | 160 |
| 2014 | → Swinton Lions (loan) |
| | Total | 271 | 0 | 0 | 0 | 324 |
- Source: As of 7 September 2014

Steve Maden (born 13 September 1982) is an English former professional rugby league footballer who played in the 2000s and 2010s. He played at club level for the Warrington Wolves, the Leigh Centurions (two spells) in the Co-operative Championship and Super League, St. Helens, Whitehaven and the Swinton Lions (loan), primarily as a wing, but also as a fullback or centre.

== Background ==
Steve Maden was born in Ashton-in-Makerfield, Greater Manchester, England.

== Club career ==
Maden began his rugby league career at Leigh Centurions Academy before he transferred to Warrington Wolves, he transferred from Warrington Wolves to St. Helens, he transferred from St. Helens to Leigh Centurions in 2004, and was part of the side that won promotion to Super League, although injury ruled him out of the Grand Final victory over Whitehaven, he played for Leigh Centurions' in 2005's Super League X campaign, he transferred from Leigh Centurions to Whitehaven for a two-year spell, he transferred from Whitehaven to Leigh Centurions for the 2008 season, he appeared on loan from Leigh Centurions for Swinton Lions during 2014.
