= Chris Johnson (rugby league) =

GB international rugby league footballer

Personal information
- Full name: Christopher Johnson
- Born: 29 May 1960 (age 65)

Playing information
- Position: Fullback
Club
Years	Team	Pld	T	G	FG	P
1984–90	Leigh	183	38	454	13	1073
1990–91	Swinton
1991–93	Trafford Borough
1993–95	Highfield
	Total	183	38	454	13	1073
Representative
Years	Team	Pld	T	G	FG	P
1985	Great Britain	1	0	0	0	0

Christopher Johnson (born 29 May 1960) is a former professional rugby league footballer who played in the 1980s and 1990s. He played at representative level for Great Britain, and at club level for Leigh, and Swinton, as a goal-kicking fullback.

== Playing career ==
=== International honours ===
Johnson won a cap for Great Britain while at Leigh in 1985 against France.

=== Club records ===
Johnson holds Leigh's "Most Goals In A Season" record, with 173 goals scored in the 1985-86 season, and he is 5th on Leigh's "Most Points In A Career" list with 1073 points, behind; John Woods (2492 points), Jimmy Ledgard (2194 points), Martyn Ridyard (1797 points), and Neil Turley (1519 points).
