= Ben Cooper (rugby league) =

English rugby league footballer

Personal information
- Full name: Ben Cooper
- Born: 8 October 1979 (age 45); Crofton, West Yorkshire, England

Playing information
- Position: Fullback, Wing, Centre
Club
Years	Team	Pld	T	G	FG	P
1999	Sheffield Eagles	2	0	0	0	0
2000–04	Huddersfield Giants	82	6	0	0	24
2005	Leigh Centurions	41	12	0	0	48
	Total	125	18	0	0	72

Ben Cooper is a former professional rugby league footballer who played in the 1990s and 2000s. He played at club level for Stanley Rangers ARLFC, Sheffield Eagles, Huddersfield Giants, and Leigh Centurions, as a fullback, Wing, or centre.

== Club career ==
Ben Cooper played in 1999's Super League IV, 2000's Super League V, 2001's Super League VI, 2002's Super League VII, 2003's Super League VIII, 2004's Super League IX, and 2005's Super League X.
