= Lewis Foster =

Lewis Foster may refer to:

- Lewis Foster (rugby league) (born 1993), English professional rugby league footballer
- Lewis R. Foster (1898–1974), American screenwriter
