= Jamie Acton =

English professional rugby league footballer

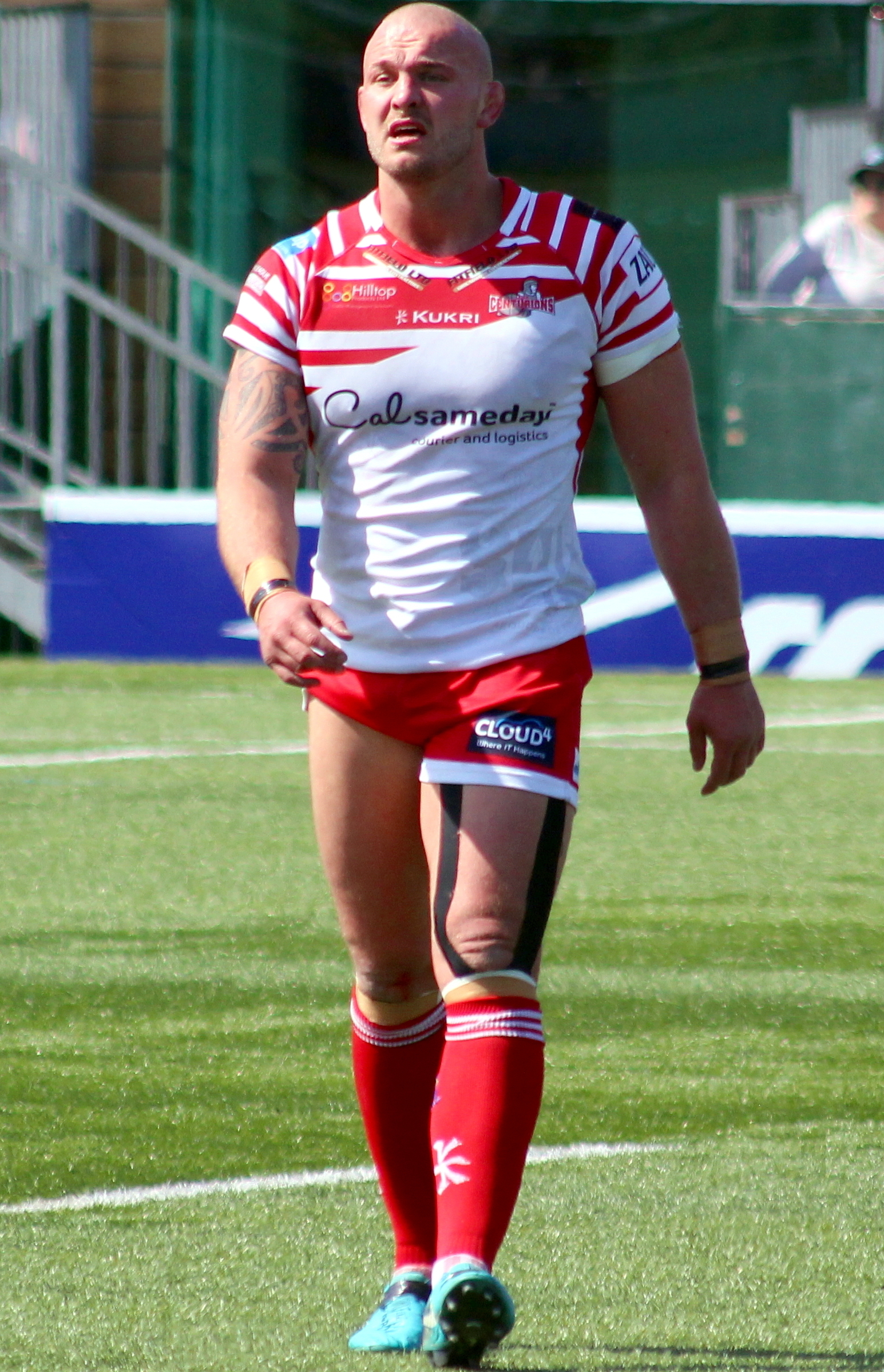

Personal information
- Born: 4 April 1992 (age 34) Royal Borough of Kensington and Chelsea, London, England

Playing information
- Height: 6 ft 1 in (1.85 m)
- Weight: 17 st 0 lb (108 kg)
- Position: Prop, Second-row
Club
Years	Team	Pld	T	G	FG	P
2012	Wigan Warriors	0	0	0	0	0
2012(loan)	→ S. Wales Scorpions	3	1	0	0	4
2012(loan)	→ Oldham	6	0	0	0	0
2013	Workington Town	23	2	0	0	8
2014–18	Leigh Centurions	95	17	0	0	68
2017(DR)	→ Sheffield Eagles	1	0	0	0	0
2019	Swinton Lions	4	0	0	0	0
	Total	132	20	0	0	80

Jamie Acton (born 4 April 1992) is a retired English professional rugby league footballer who played as a prop. He played in League 1 for Oldham and the South Wales Scorpions (Under loan from the Wigan Warriors Academy), and in the Championship for the Leigh Centurions and Workington Town, before finishing his career with the Swinton Lions.

== Background ==
Acton was born in the Royal Borough of Kensington and Chelsea, London, England.

== Club career ==
Acton first played rugby league at junior level with Hemel Stags as a 16-year-old having initially played rugby union. He was selected to represent BARLA England and GB Community Lions at under-18s level. Picked up by the Wigan Warriors, he moved north in 2010 and became a regular in Wigan's under-20s academy side during the 2011 season, playing in the victorious 2011 academy grand final team against the Warrington Wolves at Leigh Sports Village.

Acton made his senior début as a dual registered player with South Wales Scorpions in 2012 and later that season played for Oldham before signing for Workington Town at the end of the season. In 2013 he was a key member of the Workington Town side, making 23 appearances before joining Leigh Centurions in September 2013.

Acton made 22 appearances during the 2014 season including featuring in the winning team that beat Featherstone Rovers in the 2014 Kingstone Press Championship grand final at Headingley Carnegie Stadium.

He has remained an integral member of the Leigh Centurions squad which won the Kingstone Press Championship titles in 2015 and 2016, culminating in promotion to Super League by progressing through the Middle 8 Qualifiers at the end of the 2016 season. Acton made his Super League début playing for Leigh Centurions against Leeds Rhinos on 17 February 2017. In July 2017, Acton received a nine-game ban for bad conduct towards Catalans Dragons player Greg Bird during a Super League game. He was also fined £300 at the time.

At the start of the 2017 season, Acton was sent to Sheffield Eagles as part of a Dual registration deal with the Championship side. However, Acton only appeared in one game - a 32–14 win over Toulouse.

In 2019, he was forced to retire after suffering a spinal injury.
