= John Westhead =

English rugby league footballer

Personal information
- Full name: John William Westhead
- Born: first ¼ 1966; Ince, Lancashire, England
- Died: 29 May 2000 (aged 34); Leigh, Greater Manchester, England

Playing information
- Position: Second-row
Club
Years	Team	Pld	T	G	FG	P
1983–90	Leigh	136	25	0	0	100
Representative
Years	Team	Pld	T	G	FG	P
1985–86	Great Britain U-21s	3

John William Westhead (first ¼ 1966 – 29 May 2000) was an English professional rugby league footballer who played in the 1980s and 1990s. He played for at representative level for Great Britain Under-21s, and at club level for Leigh, as a second-row.

== Background ==
John Westhead's birth was registered in Ince, Lancashire, England, and he died aged 34 in Leigh, Greater Manchester.

== Career ==
Westhead made his début for Leigh in 1983 in a 22–13 victory over Barrow. He went to make over 100 appearances for the club, scoring 25 tries, but was forced to retire in 1990 due a recurring shoulder injury. He also made three appearances for Great Britain Under-21s between 1985 and 1986.

== Death ==
On 29 May 2000, Westhead severed an artery after smashing his arm through a glass panel at his home in Leigh, Greater Manchester. He was taken to Royal Bolton Hospital, but died due to severe blood loss shortly after arriving.
