= Glyn John =

Wales international rugby union & league player (1932-1983)

- Full name: Glyndwr John
- Born: 22 February 1932 Neath, Wales
- Died: 7 June 1983 (aged 51) Porthcawl, Wales
- School: Garw Grammar School
- University: St Luke's College, Exeter
- Occupation: School teacher

Rugby union career
- Position: Utility back
International career
Years	Team	Apps	(Points)
1954	Wales	2	(0)
- Rugby league career

Playing information
Club
Years	Team	Pld	T	G	FG	P
1949–50	Leigh

Glyndwr John (22 February 1932 — 7 June 1983) was a Welsh international rugby union player.

== Biography ==
John hailed from Aberkenfig near Bridgend and attended Garw Grammar School.

At the age of 17 in 1949, John signed with rugby league club Leigh RLFC for £400. He remained with Leigh for only one season, but the ramifications of turning professional made him ineligible to return to rugby union.

John, utility back, was able to play some rugby union when he joined the Royal Air Force in 1950 and the following year was reinstated by Welsh Rugby Union, due to the fact he hadn't yet turned 18 at the time he joined Leigh. His signing fee was also returned to Leigh. He stints with several clubs including Aberavon and represented Devon while studying teaching at St Luke's College, Exeter.

In the 1954 Five Nations, John was capped twice for Wales, debuting as a centre against England at Twickenham, with Bleddyn Williams out injured. His other cap came against France at Cardiff Arms Park, standing in for Cliff Morgan at outside-half.

John was banned from rugby union again in 1957 after the world governing body passed a new law which meant that his exemption no longer applied.

== See also ==
- List of Wales national rugby union players
