= Mike Callan =

English rugby league footballer

Personal information
- Full name: Mike Callan
- Born: 8 August 1983 (age 43)

Playing information
- Position: Prop, Second-row
Club
Years	Team	Pld	T	G	FG	P
2002	Warrington Wolves	4	0	0	0	0
2003–05	Leigh Centurions	6	0	0	0	0
2005	Blackpool Panthers	6	2	0	0	8
2006	Oldham Roughyeds	9	0	0	0	0
2008	Rochdale Hornets	9	0	0	0	0
	Total	34	2	0	0	8
- Source: As of 8 December 2016

Mike Callan (born 8 August 1983) is a former professional rugby league footballer who played in the 1990s and 2000s. He played at club level for Crosfields ARLFC (in Warrington), Warrington Wolves, Leigh Centurions, Blackpool Panthers, Oldham Roughyeds, and Rochdale Hornets as a prop, or second-row.
