= Dave Whittle =

Wales international rugby league footballer

Personal information
- Full name: David Whittle
- Born: 22 September 1976 (age 49) Wigan, Greater Manchester, England

Playing information
- Position: prop
Club
Years	Team	Pld	T	G	FG	P
1999–02	Leigh Centurions	5
2001(loan)	→ Warrington Wolves	3
2002(loan)	→ St Helens	3	0	0	0	0
2003	Chorley Lynx	1	1	0	0	4
	Total	12	1	0	0	4
Representative
Years	Team	Pld	T	G	FG	P
2000–02	Wales	5
- As of 25 May 2021

Dave Whittle (born 22 September 1976) is a former Wales international rugby league footballer who played in the 1990s and 2000s. He played at representative level for Wales, and at club level for the Leigh Centurions, Warrington Wolves (loan), St Helens (loan) and Chorley Lynx, as a prop.

Whittle was born in Wigan, Greater Manchester, England, and he played for Wales at the 2000 Rugby League World Cup.

Whittle made his début for Warrington Wolves on Friday 17 August 2001, and he played his last match for Warrington Wolves on Friday 31 August 2001.
