= Ken Baxter (rugby league) =

English rugby league footballer (1927–1987)

Personal information
- Full name: Kenneth Baxter
- Born: October 1927 Wigan, England
- Died: May 1987 (aged 59) unknown

Playing information
- Position: Centre, Stand-off
Club
Years	Team	Pld	T	G	FG	P
1947–56	Leigh	201	48	0	0	144

Kenneth Baxter (October 1927 – May 1987) was an English professional rugby league footballer who played in the 1940s and 1950s. He played at club level for Worsley Boys' Club (in Wigan), and Leigh, as a centre, or stand-off.

== Playing career ==
Ken Baxter made his first-team début for Leigh in the last game of the 1946–47 season, and he played his last match for Leigh against Keighley on Monday 20 August 1956.

He played in the club's 1951 Lancashire Cup final defeat against Wigan. The following season, he played for Leigh in the 1952 Lancashire Cup, and was this time on the winning side against St Helens.
