= Mailangi Styles =

Australian rugby league footballer

Personal information
- Born: 6 June 1984 (age 41); Sydney, New South Wales, Australia

Playing information
- Position: Prop
Club
Years	Team	Pld	T	G	FG	P
2006	Manly Sea Eagles	1	0	0	0	0
2007	Leigh Centurions	24	3	0	0	12
	Total	25	3	0	0	12

Mailangi Styles (born 6 June 1984) is a former professional rugby league footballer who played in the 2000s, he played for the Manly-Warringah Sea Eagles of the National Rugby League and Leigh Centurions of National League One. He played as a prop or second-row.

Styles is of Tongan and Scottish descent.

In 2006, Styles played for the Sea Eagles reserve grade side and made one appearance for the senior side. In December 2006, Styles joined Leigh Centurions where he played one season before returning to Australia.
