= Ray Tabern =

GB international rugby league & union footballer

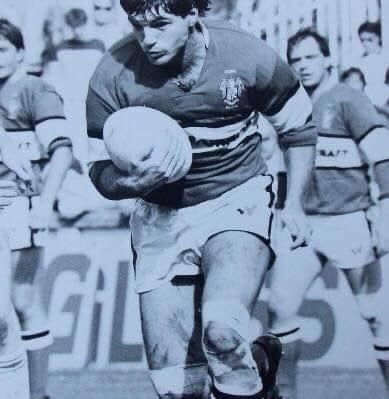

Personal information
- Born: 13 October 1953 (age 72) St Helens, Merseyside, England

Playing information

Rugby union
- Position: Hooker
Club
Years	Team	Pld	T	G	FG	P
	Leigh RUFC
	Fylde RFC
	Total	0	0	0	0	0
Representative
Years	Team	Pld	T	G	FG	P
	Lancashire

Rugby league
- Position: Hooker
Club
Years	Team	Pld	T	G	FG	P
1979–87	Leigh	195	32	0	0	115
1984	Fulham (loan)	7	1	0	0	4
1987	Blackpool Borough
1987–89	Workington Town
	Total	202	33	0	0	119
Representative
Years	Team	Pld	T	G	FG	P
1982	Great Britain	1	0	0	0	0

Ray Tabern (13 October 1953) is a rugby union, and professional rugby league footballer who played in the 1970s and 1980s. He played representative level rugby union for Lancashire and England under-23's, and at club level for Leigh RUFC and Fylde RFC as a hooker, and representative level rugby league for Great Britain, and at club level for Leigh, Fulham RLFC and Workington Town, as a hooker.

== Background ==
Ray Tabern's birth was registered in St Helens, Lancashire, England.

== Playing career ==
=== Rugby union ===
Tabern played rugby union for Leigh RUFC before moving to Fylde RFC, where he was selected to play for Lancashire. He was also selected for the England under-23 team's tour to Canada in 1977.

=== Rugby league ===
Tabern switched to rugby league in November 1979, signing for Leigh. He played hooker and was man of the match in Leigh's 8-3 victory over Widnes in the 1981 Lancashire Cup Final during the 1981–82 season at Central Park, Wigan on Saturday 26 September 1981.

Tabern won a cap as an interchange/substitute while at Leigh in Great Britain's 7-8 defeat by France in the friendly at Stadio Pier Luigi Penzo, Venice on Saturday 31 July 1982.

In March 1984, Tabern was signed on loan by Fulham RLFC until the end of the season.

== Personal life ==
Ray Tabern's father, Walt Tabern, played rugby league for Leigh.
