= Clive Jones (rugby) =

Welsh rugby footballer and coach

Personal information
- Full name: Clive Jones
- Born: Wales

Playing information

Rugby union
Club
Years	Team	Pld	T	G	FG	P
≤1972–72	Aberavon RFC

Rugby league
- Position: Loose forward
Club
Years	Team	Pld	T	G	FG	P
1972–74	Warrington	24+21	6	0	0	18
1975–78	Leigh	83+29	11	0	0	33
1979	Oldham	2+2	0	0	0	0
	Total	161	17	0	0	51
Representative
Years	Team	Pld	T	G	FG	P
1974	Other Nationalities	1	0	0	0	0
1975–78	Wales	4	0	0	0	0

Clive Jones is a Welsh former rugby union and professional rugby league footballer who played in the 1970s, and has coached rugby league. He played club level rugby union (RU) for Aberavon RFC, and representative level rugby league (RL) for Wales, and at club level for Warrington, Leigh and Oldham, as a loose forward, and has coached club level rugby league (RL) for Culcheth Eagles ARLFC (in Culcheth, Warrington, of the North West Men's League).

== Playing career ==
=== International honours ===
Clive Jones won caps for Wales (RL) while at Leigh in the 1975 Rugby League World Cup against New Zealand, and France.

=== Club career ===
Clive Jones changed rugby football codes from rugby union to rugby league when he transferred from Aberavon RFC to Warrington, he made his début for Warrington on Sunday 20 August 1972, and he played his last match for Warrington on Sunday 15 December 1974, he transferred from Warrington to Leigh, he transferred from Leigh to Oldham, he made his début for Oldham on Sunday 1 April 1979, and he played his last match for Oldham on Sunday 15 April 1979.
