= List of Wales national rugby league team players =

The Wales national rugby league team represents the nation of Wales in international rugby league, and is governed by Wales Rugby League (Welsh: Rygbi Cynghrair Cymru). The team played its first official match in 1908. Since then, more than 500 players have made at least one international appearance for the team.

This list includes all the players who have represented the Welsh national team.

== Players ==
Number	Name	Year of début	Year of final game	Caps	Tries	Goals	Field Goals	Points
1	Chick Jenkins	1908	1912	7	2	0	0	6
2	Llew Treharne	1908	1908	2	2	0	0	6
3	Bert Jenkins	1908	1914	11	4	0	0	12
4	Tom Llewellyn	1908	1908	2	0	0	0	0
5	Dai Thomas	1908	1908	3	3	0	0	9
6	David Beynon	1908	1908	1	0	0	0	0
7	Johnny Thomas	1908	1914	8	1	19	0	41
8	George Thomas	1908	1912	2	0	1	0	2
9	Dai Rees	1908	1908	2	0	0	0	0
10	Oliver Burgham	1908	1908	2	1	0	0	3
11	Dai B. Davies	1908	1913	9	2	0	0	6
12	Dai Jones	1908	1908	2	1	0	0	3
13	Howell de Francis	1908	1909	2	2	0	0	6
14	Phil Thomas	1908	1911	4	0	0	0	0
15	Rhys Rees	1908	1910	2	0	0	0	0
16	Arthur Buckler	1908	1908	1	0	0	0	0
17	George Ruddick	1908	1911	4	1	0	0	3
18	W. J. Saunders	1908	1908	1	0	0	0	0
19	Thomas Paddison	1908	1908	1	0	0	0	0
20	Billy Williams	1908	1910	4	3	0	0	9
21	Will Hopkins	1908	1908	1	0	0	0	0
22	Jack Foley	1908	1911	5	2	0	0	6
23	Billy O'Neill	1908	1909	2	0	0	0	0
24	William Dowell	1908	1908	1	0	0	0	0
25	Frank Young	1909	1910	2	0	5	0	10
26	Will Davies	1909	1912	4	6	0	0	18
27	Jack Jenkins	1909	1909	1	0	0	0	0
28	Jim Davies	1909	1912	3	0	0	0	0
29	David Galloway	1909	1910	2	0	0	0	0
30	Frank Shugars	1909	1912	5	0	0	0	0
31	Lewis Llewellyn	1910	1912	4	4	0	0	12
32	Dan Lewis	1910	1910	1	0	0	0	0
33	Dai Davies	1910	1910	1	0	0	0	0
34	Jake Blackmore	1910	1911	2	0	0	0	0
35	Ben Gronow	1910	1923	8	0	9	0	18
36	Ernie Jenkins	1910	1912	4	0	0	0	0
37	Willie Thomas	1911	1911	1	0	0	0	0
38	Tommy Grey	1911	1912	3	0	0	0	0
39	Evan Thomas	1911	1914	2	0	0	0	0
40	H. Smith	1911	1911	1	0	0	0	0
41	Joe Pugsley	1911	1911	1	0	0	0	0
42	G. Hitchings	1911	1911	1	0	0	0	0
43	Evan Davies	1912	1923	3	0	0	0	0
44	William Sandham	1912	1912	1	0	0	0	0
45	William Evans	1912	1913	2	0	0	0	0
46	Charlie Rees	1912	1912	1	0	0	0	0
47	Dai John	1913	1913	1	0	0	0	0
48	Tom Williams	1913	1913	1	1	0	0	3
49	Alf Francis	1913	1914	2	1	0	0	3
50	Ned Jones	1913	1913	1	1	0	0	3
51	Jack Chilcott	1913	1914	2	1	0	0	3
52	Percy Coldrick	1913	1914	2	1	0	0	3
53	Gus Merry	1913	1913	1	0	0	0	0
54	Bernard Frederick	1913	1913	1	0	0	0	0
55	Gwyn Thomas	1914	1921	2	0	0	0	0
56	Frank Williams	1914	1914	1	2	0	0	6
57	Willie Davies	1914	1921	2	0	0	0	0
58	Johnny Rogers	1914	1922	3	1	0	0	3
59	Rees Richards	1914	1914	1	0	0	0	0
60	Jack Beames	1914	1921	2	0	0	0	0
61	Jim Bacon	1921	1927	6	2	0	0	6
62	Danny Hurcombe	1921	1926	7	5	0	0	15
63	Tommy Howley	1921	1925	4	3	0	0	9
64	Bryn Williams	1921	1922	2	1	0	0	3
65	Robbie Lloyd	1921	1921	1	0	0	0	0
66	Sid Jerram	1921	1925	6	0	0	0	0
67	Fred Willis	1921	1921	1	0	0	0	0
68	Bernard Gould	1921	1923	4	0	0	0	0
69	Frederick Roffey	1921	1926	2	0	0	0	0
70	George Whitney	1921	1921	2	0	0	0	0
71	Jim Sullivan	1921	1939	26	3	60	0	129
72	Frank Evans	1921	1928	7	7	0	0	21
73	Fred Brown	1921	1923	3	1	0	0	3
74	George Oliver	1921	1927	4	0	0	0	0
75	Edgar Morgan	1921	1926	5	2	0	0	6
76	Tom Woods	1921	1923	3	0	0	0	0
77	Jerry Shea	1922	1923	2	0	0	0	0
78	Wyndham Emery	1922	1922	1	0	0	0	0
79	Eddie Caswell	1922	1927	3	1	0	0	3
80	Wilf Hodder	1922	1928	6	0	0	0	0
81	Ned Thomas	1923	1923	1	0	0	0	0
82	George Owens	1923	1923	2	0	0	0	0
83	Dai Edwards	1923	1925	2	0	0	0	0
84	Dai Rees	1923	1931	6	1	0	0	3
85	Harry Rees	1923	1925	2	1	0	0	3
86	Joe Corsi	1923	1923	1	0	0	0	0
87	Joe Thompson	1923	1932	8	2	1	0	8
88	Johnny Ring	1925	1930	6	5	0	0	15
89	Charlie Sage	1925	1925	2	0	0	0	0
90	Ambrose Baker	1925	1928	2	0	0	0	0
91	John Hennessey	1925	1925	1	0	0	0	0
92	Mel Rosser	1926	1933	5	4	0	0	12
93	Joe Jones	1926	1926	1	0	0	0	0
94	Ike Fowler	1926	1926	1	1	0	0	3
95	Billo Rees	1926	1930	6	0	0	0	0
96	Bryn Phillips	1926	1926	1	0	0	0	0
97	George Lewis	1926	1928	3	0	0	0	0
98	Billy Rhodes	1926	1926	1	0	1	0	2
99	Albert Green	1926	1927	2	0	0	0	0
100	Frank Stephens	1926	1930	4	0	0	0	0
101	Ponty Davies	1926	1928	3	0	0	0	0
102	Jack Gore	1926	1928	3	3	0	0	9
103	Dai Jenkins	1927	1932	4	1	0	0	3
104	Eddie Watkins	1927	1927	1	0	0	0	0
105	Gwyn Parker	1928	1935	4	2	0	0	6
106	Alf Higgs	1928	1928	1	0	0	0	0
107	Dai Davies	1928	1935	4	0	0	0	0
108	Les White	1928	1933	7	1	0	0	3
109	Emlyn Gwynne	1928	1928	1	0	0	0	0
110	Tommy Parker	1928	1930	2	0	0	0	0
111	Eddie Williams	1928	1928	1	0	0	0	0
112	Candy Evans	1928	1933	4	0	0	0	0
113	Dai Maidment	1928	1928	1	1	0	0	3
114	Steve Ray	1930	1932	2	1	0	0	3
115	Billy Williams	1930	1933	3	0	0	0	0
116	Jesse Meredith	1930	1930	1	0	0	0	0
117	Arthur Lloyd	1931	1931	1	0	0	0	0
118	Gus Risman	1931	1945	18	5	6	0	27
119	Billy Thomas	1931	1931	1	0	0	0	0
120	Tommy Flynn	1931	1931	1	0	0	0	0
121	Reg Hathway	1932	1932	2	0	0	0	0
122	W. Jones	1932	1932	1	0	0	0	0
123	Gwyn Davies	1932	1935	3	1	0	0	3
124	Idris Towill	1932	1932	1	0	0	0	0
125	Billy Watkins	1932	1936	6	1	0	0	3
126	Bill Morgan	1932	1932	1	0	0	0	0
127	Trevor Thomas	1932	1940	3	0	0	0	0
128	Norman Fender	1932	1938	9	1	0	0	3
129	Jack Morley	1932	1936	5	5	0	0	15
130	Emlyn Jenkins	1932	1936	4	0	0	0	0
131	Aubrey Casewell	1932	1932	1	0	0	0	0
132	Freddie Smart	1933	1933	1	0	0	0	0
133	Dicky Ralph	1933	1933	1	0	0	0	0
134	Ralph Green	1933	1933	1	0	0	0	0
135	Iowerth Isaac	1933	1935	2	3	0	0	9
136	Jack Williams	1935	1935	1	0	0	0	0
137	George Bennett	1935	1936	3	2	0	0	6
138	Gomer Hughes	1935	1940	3	0	0	0	0
139	Mel Meek	1935	1949	14	0	0	0	0
140	Lou Rees	1935	1938	5	0	0	0	0
141	Harold Jones	1935	1936	3	0	0	0	0
142	Ossie Griffiths	1935	1936	4	3	0	0	9
143	Tommy Scourfield	1935	1935	1	0	0	0	0
144	Islwyn Davies	1935	1935	1	0	1	0	2
145	Stan Mountain	1935	1935	1	0	0	0	0
146	Len Orchard	1935	1935	1	1	0	0	3
147	Bert Day	1935	1935	3	0	0	0	0
148	Harold Edwards	1935	1938	2	0	0	0	0
149	Norman Pugh	1935	1938	6	0	0	0	0
150	Fred Talbot	1935	1935	1	0	0	0	0
151	Dennis Madden	1935	1939	7	4	0	0	12
152	Alan Edwards	1935	1948	18	9	0	0	27
153	Con Murphy	1935	1947	11	0	0	0	0
154	George Gummer	1936	1936	2	1	0	0	3
155	Dai Prosser	1936	1944	8	0	0	0	0
156	David Evans	1936	1936	2	0	0	0	0
157	Alex Givvons	1936	1938	6	0	0	0	0
158	Cliff Evans	1936	1941	7	1	0	0	3
159	Bill Johnson	1938	1938	6	0	0	0	0
160	Oliver Morris	1938	1941	6	0	0	0	0
161	Dai Jenkins	1938	1948	17	1	0	0	3
162	Gil Morgan	1938	1938	1	0	0	0	0
163	Des Case	1938	1947	4	2	0	0	6
164	Frank Whitcombe	1938	1948	14	0	0	0	0
165	Harold Thomas	1938	1939	2	1	0	0	3
166	Emrys Hughes	1938	1939	2	0	0	0	0
167	Jim Regan	1939	1939	1	0	0	0	0
168	Gwyn Williams	1939	1939	1	1	0	0	3
169	Arthur Bassett	1939	1946	3	0	0	0	0
170	Billy Davies	1939	1948	9	1	0	0	3
171	Dai Davies	1939	1948	9	0	0	0	0
172	Trevor Foster	1939	1951	16	5	1	0	17
173	Sandy Orford	1939	1944	4	0	0	0	0
174	Joe Jones	1940	1949	15	2	1	0	8
175	Emlyn Walters	1940	1948	9	2	0	0	6
176	Syd Williams	1940	1952	5	0	0	0	0
177	Emlyn Watkins	1941	1945	3	0	0	0	0
178	Alban Davies	1943	1946	2	0	3	0	6
179	Bill Davies	1943	1947	6	1	8	0	19
180	William "Bill" G. Chapman	1943	1944	2	0	0	0	0
181	Stan Powell	1945	1947	2	0	1	0	2
182	Idwal Davies	1945	1945	1	0	0	0	0
183	Mel De Lloyd	1945	1945	1	0	0	0	0
184	Fred Hughes	1945	1946	3	0	0	0	0
185	Emrys Evans	1945	1945	1	0	0	0	0
186	Jack Bowen	1945	1948	2	0	0	0	0
187	Ike Owens	1945	1949	12	2	0	0	6
188	Gareth Price	1945	1948	11	4	0	0	12
189	Doug Phillips	1945	1951	9	1	0	0	3
190	Roy Francis	1946	1948	5	1	0	0	3
191	Ted Ward	1946	1951	13	1	25	0	53
192	Reg Jones	1946	1946	1	0	0	0	0
193	Glyn Jones	1946	1946	1	0	0	0	0
194	Tuss Griffiths	1946	1951	2	0	0	0	0
195	Reg Lloyd	1946	1947	7	2	0	0	6
196	Elwyn Gwyther	1947	1953	16	2	0	0	6
197	Norman Harris	1947	1953	7	3	0	0	9
198	Dickie Williams	1947	1953	13	5	0	0	15
199	Glyn Morgan	1947	1949	4	1	0	0	3
200	Bryn Goldswain	1947	1953	16	1	4	0	11
201	Les Thomas	1947	1947	5	3	0	0	9
202	Dyl Harris	1947	1951	4	0	0	0	0
203	Hagan Evans	1947	1949	2	0	0	0	0
204	Bob Jones	1947	1949	3	1	0	0	3
205	Frank Osmond	1948	1951	14	0	0	0	0
206	Steve Llewellyn	1948	1953	4	0	0	0	0
207	Joseph Mahoney	1948	1950	5	1	0	0	3
208	Leonard "Len" Constance	1948	1951	3	0	0	0	0
209	Charlie Staines	1948	1948	1	0	0	0	0
210	Derek Howes	1948	1950	5	1	0	0	3
211	Ray Price	1948	1953	6	3	1	0	11
212	Harry Royal	1948	1948	2	0	0	0	0
213	Denis Boocker	1948	1950	5	0	0	0	0
214	George Parsons	1948	1959	13	1	0	0	3
215	Arthur Daniels	1949	1953	13	9	0	0	27
216	Eynon Hawkins	1949	1953	6	0	0	0	0
217	Billy Banks	1949	1953	17	1	1	0	5
218	Ralph Morgan	1949	1950	3	0	2	0	4
219	Les Williams	1949	1949	15	5	0	0	15
220	Jack Davies	1949	1951	2	1	1	0	5
221	Tom Danter	1949	1953	5	0	0	0	0
222	Jack Evans	1950	1953	10	0	15	0	30
223	Roy Lambert	1950	1952	7	2	0	0	6
224	Don Gullick	1950	1953	9	4	0	0	12
225	Granville James	1950	1953	5	1	0	0	3
226	Terry Cook	1951	1953	4	3	0	0	9
227	Mel Ford	1951	1951	1	1	0	0	3
228	Ray Cale	1951	1951	4	0	0	0	0
229	Viv Harrison	1951	1951	3	0	1	0	2
230	Owen Phillips	1951	1953	6	0	0	0	0
231	Milson Hunt	1951	1951	1	1	0	0	3
232	Tommy Harris	1952	1959	8	2	0	0	6
233	Mike Condon	1952	1953	3	0	0	0	0
234	Charlie Winslade	1952	1963	6	0	0	0	0
235	Bryn Day	1952	1952	2	0	0	0	0
236	Brian Radford	1952	1952	1	0	0	0	0
237	Bill Griffin	1952	1952	1	0	0	0	0
238	Dai Bevan	1953	1953	2	0	0	0	0
239	John Thorley	1953	1959	3	0	0	0	0
240	Bill Hopper	1953	1953	1	0	0	0	0
241	Melbourne Tierney	1953	1953	1	0	0	0	0
242	Glyn Moses	1953	1953	1	0	0	0	0
243	Lewis Jones	1953	1963	2	0	5	0	10
244	Malcolm Davies	1953	1959	2	1	0	0	3
245	Bernard McNally	1953	1953	1	0	0	0	0
246	Garfield Owen	1959	1959	1	0	1	0	2
247	Lionel Emmitt	1959	1959	1	0	0	0	0
248	Gordon Lewis	1959	1970	5	2	0	0	6
249	John Cheshire	1959	1959	1	1	0	0	3
250	Graham Jones	1959	1959	1	1	0	0	3
251	Rees Thomas	1959	1959	1	0	0	0	0
252	Dai Moses	1959	1959	1	0	0	0	0
253	Don Vines	1959	1963	2	0	0	0	0
254	Kel Coslett	1963	1975	13	1	8	0	19
255	Ray Glastonbury	1963	1963	1	1	0	0	3
256	Colin Dixon	1963	1981	16	2	0	0	6
257	Johnny Freeman	1963	1963	1	0	0	0	0
258	Colin Evans	1963	1969	2	0	0	0	0
259	Stan Owen	1963	1963	1	0	0	0	0
260	Ron Morgan	1963	1963	1	0	0	0	0
261	Idwal Fisher	1963	1963	1	0	0	0	0
262	Terry Robbins	1963	1963	1	0	0	0	0
263	Terry Price	1968	1970	5	2	14	0	34
264	Frank Wilson	1968	1975	14	1	0	0	3
265	Alex Kersey-Brown	1968	1969	2	0	0	0	0
266	David Jones	1968	1969	2	1	0	0	3
267	Clive Sullivan	1968	1979	15	7	0	0	21
268	David Watkins	1968	1979	16	2	32	4	74
269	Bob Prosser	1968	1970	4	0	0	0	0
270	John Warlow	1968	1970	3	0	0	0	0
271	Tony Fisher	1968	1978	16	1	0	0	3
272	Graham Rees	1968	1970	4	1	0	0	3
273	John Mantle	1968	1978	16	1	0	0	3
274	Bobby Wanbon	1968	1975	7	0	0	0	0
275	Peter Rowe	1969	1979	10	2	0	1	7
276	Dennis Brown	1969	1969	1	0	0	0	0
277	Ron Hill	1969	1970	2	0	0	0	0
278	Phil Morgan	1969	1970	5	1	0	0	3
279	Jim Mills	1969	1979	17	3	0	0	9
280	Maurice Richards	1969	1975	3	0	0	0	0
281	Colin Standing	1969	1970	2	0	0	0	0
282	Keith Jarrett	1970	1970	2	1	0	0	3
283	David Willicombe	1970	1978	13	3	0	0	9
284	Stuart Ferguson	1970	1970	1	0	2	0	4
285	Cliff Williams	1970	1970	1	0	0	0	0
286	Bill Francis	1975	1980	19	5	0	0	15
287	Roy Mathias	1975	1981	20	2	0	0	6
288	John Bevan	1975	1982	17	5	0	0	15
289	Peter Banner	1975	1975	9	2	0	0	6
290	Mike Nicholas	1975	1979	6	0	0	0	0
291	Stuart Gallacher	1975	1975	4	0	0	0	0
292	Richard Evans	1975	1978	5	0	0	0	0
293	Glyn Turner	1975	1978	6	0	0	0	0
294	Mick Murphy	1975	1979	5	0	0	0	0
295	Brian Butler	1975	1977	4	0	0	0	0
296	Richard Wallace	1975	1975	1	0	0	0	0
297	David Treasure	1975	1977	5	1	0	0	3
298	Eddie Cunningham	1975	1978	8	2	0	0	6
299	Mel James	1975	1981	11	1	0	0	3
300	Brian Gregory	1975	1975	3	1	0	0	3
301	Clive Jones	1975	1978	4	0	0	0	0
302	Paul Woods	1977	1981	10	0	13	0	26
303	Ray Wilkins	1977	1977	2	0	0	0	0
304	Dennis Curling	1977	1977	1	0	0	0	0
305	John Risman	1978	1979	3	0	0	0	0
306	Glyn Shaw	1978	1984	7	0	0	0	0
307	Gordon Pritchard	1978	1981	3	0	0	0	0
308	Frank Davies	1978	1978	1	0	0	0	0
309	Trevor Skerrett	1978	1984	7	0	0	0	0
310	Harold Box	1978	1981	5	1	2	0	7
311	Brian Juliff	1978	1979	8	1	0	0	3
312	Tommy Cunningham	1979	1979	2	0	0	0	0
313	Graeme Johns	1979	1984	2	0	0	0	0
314	Paul Prendiville	1979	1984	6	1	0	0	3
315	Steve Diamond	1980	1981	3	0	2	0	4
316	Chris Camilleri	1980	1984	3	0	0	0	0
317	Ness Flowers	1980	1984	4	1	0	0	3
318	Donald Parry	1980	1982	6	1	0	0	3
319	Mark McJennett	1980	1984	3	0	0	0	0
320	Clive Griffiths	1980	1981	2	0	0	0	0
321	Chris Seldon	1980	1980	2	0	0	0	0
322	Graham Walters	1980	1984	3	0	0	0	0
323	Adrian Cambriani	1981	1981	3	0	0	0	0
324	Danny Wilson	1981	1984	4	1	1	2	8
325	Gareth Owen	1981	1981	2	0	0	0	0
326	Roger Owen	1981	1981	2	0	0	0	0
327	Steve Rule	1981	1981	1	0	2	0	4
328	Martin Herdman	1981	1982	3	0	0	0	0
329	Steve Bayliss	1981	1981	1	0	0	0	0
330	Steve Fenwick	1981	1982	2	0	5	0	10
331	Tommy David	1981	1982	2	0	0	0	0
332	Paul Ringer	1981	1982	2	0	0	0	0
333	Lynn Hopkins	1982	1982	1	0	1	0	2
334	Lynn Hallett	1982	1984	2	0	2	0	4
335	Brynmor Williams	1982	1982	1	1	0	0	3
336	Mike Davies	1984	1984	1	0	0	0	0
337	Phil Ford	1984	1995	10	4	0	0	16
338	Chris Preece	1984	1984	1	0	0	0	0
339	Chris O'Brien	1984	1984	1	0	0	0	0
340	John Devereux	1991	2000	12	3	1	0	14
341	Allan Bateman	1991	2003	14	6	0	0	24
342	Jonathan Davies	1991	1995	9	3	39	5	95
343	Anthony Sullivan	1991	2000	20	6	0	0	24
344	Jonathan Griffiths	1991	1994	6	2	0	1	9
345	Kevin Ellis	1991	2004	15	5	0	1	21
346	Dai Young	1991	1996	15	0	0	0	0
347	Barry Williams	1991	1994	4	1	0	0	4
348	Mark Jones	1991	1996	11	4	0	0	16
349	Rob Ackerman	1991	1993	5	2	0	0	8
350	Paul Moriarty	1991	2000	16	0	0	0	0
351	David Bishop	1991	1992	4	1	0	0	4
352	Adrian Hadley	1991	1995	11	5	8	0	36
353	Rowland Phillips	1991	1998	17	4	0	0	16
354	Matthew Silva	1991	1991	1	0	0	0	0
355	Gary Pearce	1991	1992	4	0	3	1	7
356	Ian Marlow	1992	1994	7	1	0	0	4
357	Gerald Cordle	1991	1996	8	2	0	0	8
358	Mark Moran	1992	1992	2	0	0	0	0
359	Ian Stevens	1992	1992	1	0	0	0	0
360	Peter Williams	1992	1992	1	0	0	0	0
361	Paul Kennett	1992	1992	1	0	0	0	0
362	Mark Perrett	1994	1996	7	0	0	0	0
363	Daio Powell	1994	1994	3	2	0	0	8
364	Richard Webster	1994	1996	6	2	0	0	8
365	Scott Gibbs	1994	1995	3	0	0	0	0
366	Iestyn Harris	1994	2007	20	12	58	1	165
367	Jason Lee	1994	2001	7	4	0	0	16
368	Paul Atcheson	1995	2003	17	5	0	0	20
369	Kelvin Skerrett	1995	1998	6	0	0	0	0
370	Martin Hall	1995	1996	9	0	0	0	0
371	Richard Eyres	1995	1999	8	0	0	0	0
372	Neil Cowie	1995	1999	7	1	0	0	4
373	Keiron Cunningham	1995	2001	13	7	0	0	28
374	Scott Quinnell	1995	1995	4	3	0	0	12
375	Gareth Davies	1995	1996	4	5	0	0	20
376	David Williams	1995	1995	2	1	0	0	4
377	Gavin Price-Jones	1995	1995	2	1	0	0	4
378	Ian Watson	1995	2011	30	7	1	0	30
379	Mark Sheals	1995	1995	1	1	0	0	4
380	Gareth Stephens	1995	1998	4	0	0	0	0
381	Mickey Edwards	1995	1995	2	0	0	0	0
382	Billy Boston (Note: Boston never played a full international for Wales, but was awarded an honorary cap in 2016.)	n/a						
383	Jason Critchley	1996	2001	10	2	0	0	8
384	Chris Morley	1996	2006	15	2	0	0	8
385	Diccon Edwards	1996	1996	1	0	0	0	0
386	Damian Gibson	1998	2008	18	8	0	0	32
387	Lee Briers	1998	2010	23	9	29	6	100
388	Dean Busby	1998	2000	6	1	0	0	4
389	Karle Hammond	1998	1999	3	0	0	0	0
390	Martin Pearson	1998	2001	4	2	2	0	12
391	Wes Davies	1999	2000	8	3	0	0	12
392	Steve Thomas	1999	2007	5	2	0	0	8
393	Lenny Woodard	1999	2005	5	3	0	0	12
394	Craig Makin	1999	1999	2	0	0	0	0
395	Barry Eaton	1999	2001	5	0	0	0	0
396	Paul Highton	1999	2002	9	0	0	0	0
397	David Luckwell	1999	2000	3	0	0	0	0
398	Chris Smith	1999	2002	5	1	0	0	4
399	Paul Sterling	2000	2000	5	2	0	0	8
400	Kris Tassell	2000	2004	11	6	0	0	24
401	Anthony Farrell	2000	2003	8	1	0	0	4
402	Mick Jenkins	2000	2000	5	3	0	0	12
403	Garreth Carvell	2000	2000	3	0	0	0	0
404	Justin Morgan	2000	2002	9	0	0	0	0
405	Hefin O'Hare	2000	2004	8	2	0	0	8
406	Dave Whittle	2000	2002	6	0	0	0	0
407	Mark Lennon	2001	2011	18	8	13	0	58
408	Keith Mason	2001	2002	2	0	0	0	0
409	Steffan Hughes	2001	2001	1	0	0	0	0
410	Gareth Dean	2001	2007	11	0	0	0	0
411	Gareth Price	1999	2006	11	1	0	0	4
412	Adam Hughes	2002	2007	13	9	3	0	42
413	David Mills	2002	2008	8	0	0	0	0
414	Rob Roberts	2002	2007	8	2	0	0	8
415	Aled James	2003	2010	13	1	0	0	4
416	Jordan James	2003	2013	30	9	0	0	36
417	Damien Hudd	2003	2004	2	0	0	0	0
418	Jon Aston	2003	2003	2	0	0	0	0
419	Bryn Powell	2004	2006	6	3	0	0	12
420	Dave Clarke	2004	2004	2	0	0	0	0
421	Barry Pugh	2004	2004	2	0	0	0	0
422	Nathan Strong	2004	2004	2	0	0	0	0
423	Neil Davies	2004	2005	2	0	0	0	0
424	Tom Brown	2004	2004	1	0	0	0	0
425	Lewis Taylor	2004	2004	1	0	0	0	0
426	Richard Johnston	2005	2006	4	2	0	0	8
427	Anthony Blackwood	2005	2009	8	3	0	0	12
428	Phil Joseph	2005	2015	10	1	0	0	4
429	Karl Hocking	2005	2005	1	0	0	0	0
430	Byron Smith	2005	2007	4	0	0	0	0
431	Jon Breakingbury	2005	2005	1	0	0	0	0
432	Paul Morgan	2005	2005	2	0	0	0	0
433	Gary Hulse	2006	2006	1	0	0	0	0
434	Hywel Davies	2006	2006	1	0	0	0	0
435	Luke Dyer	2007	2007	3	1	0	0	4
436	Dave Halley	2007	2008	4	2	0	0	8
437	Phil Cushion	2007	2007	2	0	0	0	0
438	Ian Webster	2007	2013	16	3	17	0	46
439	Matt James	2007	2007	3	1	0	0	4
440	Sean Penkywicz	2007	2008	4	1	0	0	4
441	Aaron Summers	2007	2007	1	0	0	0	0
442	Craig Kopzcak	2007	2015	17	1	0	0	4
443	Andy Bracek	2007	2012	8	1	0	0	4
444	Mark Roberts	2007	2007	1	0	0	0	0
445	Lee Williams	2008	2011	7	2	0	0	8
446	Rhys Williams	2008	2015	21	16	0	0	64
447	Ben Flower	2008	2013	17	1	0	0	4
448	Geraint Davies	2008	2011	7	1	0	0	4
449	Rhys Griffiths	2008	2009	3	0	0	0	0
450	Matt Barron	2008	2015	9	0	0	0	0
451	Gil Dudson	2008	2013	17	1	0	0	4
452	Elliot Kear	2009	2015	18	11	0	0	44
453	Ashley Bateman	2009	2014	7	3	0	0	12
454	Lloyd White	2009	2013	12	3	19	0	50
455	Neil Budworth	2009	2013	16	0	0	0	0
456	Ross Divorty	2009	2013	12	2	0	0	8
457	Matt Thomas	2009	2009	2	1	0	0	4
458	Christiaan Roets	2009	2015	21	13	0	0	52
459	Chris Beasley	2009	2010	8	0	0	0	0
460	Lewis Mills	2009	2010	3	0	0	0	0
461	Andrew Gay	2010	2011	3	1	0	0	4
462	Lewis Reece	2010	2015	7	1	6	0	16
463	Gareth Thomas	2010	2010	4	3	0	0	12
464	Danny Jones	2010	2013	12	0	3	0	6
465	Steve Parry	2010	2015	6	2	0	0	8
466	Jordan Ross	2010	2010	4	0	0	0	0
467	Rhodri Lloyd	2010	2015	9	3	0	0	12
468	Harri Greville	2010	2010	1	0	0	0	0
469	Joe Burke	2010	2015	8	1	0	0	4
470	Chris Davies	2010	2010	1	0	0	0	0
471	Mark Wool	2010	2010	1	0	0	0	0
472	Dafydd Carter	2010	2010	1	0	0	0	0
473	Jack Pring	2010	2012	2	0	0	0	0
474	Jacob Emmitt	2010	2013	5	1	0	0	4
475	Tyson Frizell	2011	2013	6	1	0	0	4
476	Peter Lupton	2011	2014	7	1	0	0	4
477	Matt Seamark	2011	2013	6	0	3	0	6
478	David James	2012	2012	3	2	0	0	8
479	Michael Channing	2012	2015	6	0	0	0	0
480	Ollie Olds	2012	2015	7	0	0	0	0
481	Daniel Fleming	2012	2014	6	2	0	0	8
482	Iwan Brown	2012	2012	1	0	0	0	0
483	Craig Moss	2012	2012	3	0	0	0	0
484	Rob Massam	2012	2013	2	1	0	0	4
485	Ben Evans	2012	2013	4	1	0	0	4
486	Rhys Pugsley	2012	2012	1	0	0	0	0
487	Rhys Evans	2013	2013	3	0	0	0	0
488	Larne Patrick	2013	2013	3	0	0	0	0
489	Anthony Walker	2013	2015	5	2	0	0	8
490	Tom Hughes	2014	2014	3	1	0	0	4
491	Yannic Parker	2014	2014	1	0	0	0	0
492	Kyle Scrivens	2014	2014	2	0	0	0	0
493	Ricky Hough	2014	2014	3	0	0	0	0
494	Phil Carleton	2014	2014	1	0	0	0	0
495	Izaak Duffy	2014	2014	2	0	0	0	0
496	Connor Farrer	2014	2015	5	1	0	0	4
497	Morgan Evans	2014	2015	5	0	0	0	0
498	Dalton Grant	2014	2015	5	4	0	0	16
499	Matty Fozard	2014	2014	2	1	0	0	4
500	Owain Griffiths	2014	2014	1	0	0	0	0
501	Paul Emanuelli	2014	2014	2	0	0	0	0
502	Courtney Davies	2015	2015	3	1	9	0	22
503	Morgan Knowles	2015	2015	1	0	0	0	0
504	Regan Grace	2015	2015	2	0	0	0	0

== See also ==
- List of Great Britain national rugby league team players
- Wales national rugby league team match results
- Wales A

== Sources ==
- Wales players stats and details
