= 2012 Autumn International Series =

- Number of teams: 3
- Host countries: England; France; Wales
- Winner: England (1st title)
- Matches played: 4
- Top scorer: (England) Kevin Sinfield - 56 points
- Top try scorer: (England) Ryan Hall - 6 tries

The 2012 Autumn International Series was a rugby league tri-series between England, France and Wales.

== Teams ==
Team	Coach	Captain	RLIF Rank
England	(England) Steve McNamara	Kevin Sinfield	3
France	(France) Aurelien Cologni	Olivier Elima	5
Wales	(Wales) Iestyn Harris	Craig Kopczak	6

== France vs Wales ==
20 October 2012

France	20–6	Wales
Tries: Bemba, Stacul, Bosc; Goals: Bosc 4/4		Tries: D. James; Goals: Seamark 1/1

Stade Félix Bollaert, Lens
Attendance: 11,278
Player of the Match: Thomas Bosc (France)

France	positions	Wales
1. Cyril Stacul	Fullback	1. David James
5. Clement Soubeyras	Winger	2. Rob Massam
3. Vincent Duport	Centre	3. Christiaan Roets
4. Kevin Larroyer	Centre	4. Michael Channing
14. Mathias Pala	Winger	5. Elliot Kear
6. Thomas Bosc	Stand Off	6. Danny Jones
7. William Barthau	Scrum half	7. Matt Seamark
8. Olivier Elima	Prop	8. Gil Dudson
9. Tony Gigot	Hooker	9. Neil Budworth
10. Rémi Casty	Prop	10. Craig Kopczak
11. Antoni Maria	2nd Row	11. Rhodri Lloyd
12. Sebastien Raguin	2nd Row	12. Ben Evans
13. Gregory Mounis	Loose forward / Lock	13. Ben Flower
17. Éloi Pélissier	Interchange	14. Daniel Fleming
15. Mathieu Griffi	Interchange	15. Jordan James
16. Jason Baitieri	Interchange	16. Rhys Pugsley
19. Romaric Bemba	Interchange	17. Craig Moss
Aurelien Cologni	Coach	Iestyn Harris

== Wales vs England ==
27 October 2012

Wales	12–80	England
Tries: Roets, Fleming; Goals: Seamark 2/2		Tries: Hall (2), Charnley (4), Hardaker (2), Watkins, Ellis, Burrow, Cudjoe (2), Jones-Buchanan; Goals: Sinfield 12/14

Racecourse Stadium, Wrexham
Attendance: 4,014
Referee: Thierry Alibert
Player of the Match: Kevin Sinfield (England)

Wales	positions	England
1. Craig Moss	Fullback	1. Zak Hardaker
2. Elliot Kear	Winger	2. Josh Charnley
3. Mike Channing	Centre	3. Kallum Watkins
4. Christiaan Roets	Centre	4. Leroy Cudjoe
5. David James	Winger	5. Ryan Hall
6. Danny Jones	Stand Off	6. Kevin Sinfield
7. Matt Seamark	Scrum half	7. Richie Myler
8. Jordan James	Prop	8. Adrian Morley
9. Neil Budworth	Hooker	9. Michael McIlorum
10. Craig Kopczak	Prop	10. Chris Hill
11. Rhodri Lloyd	2nd Row	11. Jamie Jones-Buchanan
12. Ben Evans	2nd Row	12. Gareth Ellis
13. Ben Flower	Loose forward	13. Sean O'Loughlin
14. Gill Dudson	Interchange	14. Rob Burrow
15. Dan Fleming	Interchange	15. Gareth Hock
16.	Interchange	16. Carl Ablett
17.	Interchange	17. Lee Mossop
Iestyn Harris	Coach	Steve McNamara

== England vs France ==
3 November 2012

England	44–6	France
Tries: Watkins (3), Briscoe (2), Tomkins (2), Sinfield; Goals: Sinfield 6/8		Tries: Bentley; Goals: Bosc 1/1

MS3 Craven Park, Hull
Attendance: 7,173
Referee: Shane Rehm
Player of the Match: Gareth Hock (England)

England	positions	France
1. Sam Tomkins	Fullback	1. Cyril Stacul
2. Ryan Hall	Winger	2. Damien Cardace
3. Kallum Watkins	Centre	3. Mathias Pala
4. Leroy Cudjoe	Centre	4. Vincent Duport
5. Tom Briscoe	Winger	5. Clement Soubeyras
6. Kevin Sinfield	Stand Off	6. Thomas Bosc
7. Richie Myler	Scrum half	7. William Barthau
8. Lee Mossop	Prop	8. Olivier Elima
9. Michael McIlorum	Hooker	9. Kane Bentley
10. Chris Hill	Prop	10. Rémi Casty
11. Gareth Ellis	2nd Row	11. Kevin Larroyer
12. Gareth Hock	2nd Row	12. Jason Baitieri
13. Jamie Jones-Buchanan	Loose forward	13. Gregory Mounis
14. Rob Burrow	Interchange	14. Éloi Pélissier
15. Adrian Morley	Interchange	15. Mathieu Griffi
16. Carl Ablett	Interchange	16. Romaric Bemba
17. Ben Harrison	Interchange	17. Michael Simon
Steve McNamara	Coach	Aurelien Cologni

== Final ==
11 November 2012

England	48–4	France
Tries: Hall (4), Tomkins (2), Charnley, Burrow; Goals: Sinfield 8/8		Tries: Pala; Goals: Bosc 0/1

Salford City Stadium, Salford
Attendance: 7,921
Player of the Match: Ryan Hall (England)

England	positions	France
1. Sam Tomkins	Fullback	1. Clement Soubeyras
2. Josh Charnley	Winger	2. Teddy Sadaoui
3. Kallum Watkins	Centre	3. Kevin Larroyer
4. Leroy Cudjoe	Centre	4. Vincent Duport
5. Ryan Hall	Winger	5. Mathias Pala
6. Kevin Sinfield	Stand Off	6. Thomas Bosc
7. Rangi Chase	Scrum half	7. William Barthau
8. Lee Mossop	Prop	8. Jamal Fakir
9. Michael McIlorum	Hooker	9. Kane Bentley
10. Chris Hill	Prop	10. Rémi Casty
11. Jamie Jones-Buchanan	2nd Row	11. Olivier Elima
12. Gareth Ellis	2nd Row	12. Sebastien Raguin
13. Sean O'Loughlin	Loose forward	13. Jason Baitieri
14. Rob Burrow	Interchange	14. Romaric Bemba
15. Carl Ablett	Interchange	15. Tony Gigot
16. Gareth Hock	Interchange	16. Julian Bousquet
17. Adrian Morley	Interchange	17. Mathieu Griffi
Steve McNamara	Coach	Aurelien Cologni
