= Reginald Jones =

Reginald, Reggie or Reg Jones may refer to:

- Reginald H. Jones (1917–2003), English chairman of General Electric, 1972–1981
- Reginald Jones (artist) (1857–1920), English landscape painter
- Reginald Victor Jones (1911–1997), English physicist and scientific military intelligence expert
- Reggie Jones (cornerback, born 1969), former professional American football player for the New Orleans Saints
- Reggie Jones (cornerback, born 1986), American football cornerback for the Washington Redskins
- Reggie Jones (wide receiver) (born 1971), American football player and triple jumper
- Reggie Jones (boxer) (born 1951), American boxer
- Roger Jones (footballer, born 1902) (Reginald Jones, 1902–1967), English soccer player
- Reggie Jones (sprinter) (born 1953), American sprinter of the 1970s
- Reg Jones (rugby), Welsh rugby union and rugby league footballer of the 1940s
- Reginald Jones (rugby league), rugby league player
- Reginald L. Jones (1931–2005), clinical psychologist and college professor
