= Anthony Little =

Anthony Little may refer to:

- Anthony Little (boxer) (born 1980), Australian amateur lightweight boxer
- Tony Little (born 1956), American television fitness personality and businessman
- Tony Little (headmaster), British teacher, headmaster of Eton College
- Anthony Little (rugby) (1880–1960), Scottish rugby union and rugby league player
