= Lewis Bradley (rugby) =

English rugby union and rugby league footballer

Personal information
- Full name: Lewis Bradley
- Born: 1889; Ruardean, Gloucestershire, England
- Died: 20 June 1918 (aged 29); Somme, France

Playing information

Rugby union
Club
Years	Team	Pld	T	G	FG	P
≤1911–11	Pontypool RFC

Rugby league
- Position: Wing
Club
Years	Team	Pld	T	G	FG	P
1911–18	Wigan	123	136	1	0	410

Lewis "Lew" Bradley (1889 – 20 June 1918) was an English rugby union and professional rugby league footballer who played in the 1900s and 1910s. He played club level rugby union for Cinderford R.F.C., Lydney RFC and Pontypool RFC, and club level rugby league for Wigan as a winger.

== Background ==
Lewis Bradley was born in 1889 in Ruardean, Gloucestershire, England. He was the youngest of four brothers and two sisters born to John George and Ann Bradley. He lived with his family at The Roebuck Inn (now closed and occupied by a residential development called Roebuck Meadows).

== Rugby career ==
=== Rugby union ===
Bradley began playing rugby with his local club, Cinderford R.F.C., and represented Gloucestershire at county level for the first time in 1908. He went on to play for Lydney RFC before moving to Wales to play for Pontypool RFC. While playing rugby at Pontypool, Bradley also worked as a butcher.

=== Rugby league ===
Bradley changed rugby football codes from rugby union to rugby league on 1 December 1911, signing a professional contract with Wigan. He made his début on the following day in a 17–15 victory over Wakefield Trinity at Central Park. Scoring a try on his début, he was described by the Wigan Observer and District Advertiser as being "Quick off the mark he was often past his opposing threequarter before the latter realised Bradley had the ball. Shall we ever forget this speedy wing threequarter at Central Park? He was the idol of the crowd and it only seems like yesterday that he was dashing down the touchline, his long flowing hair blowing in the wind, those long raking strides, and that final natural swerve". At the end of his first season with the club, he played and scored a try against Huddersfield in the Championship Final at Thrum Hall, Halifax on Saturday 4 May 1912, but Wigan went on to lose the match 5–13.

During the 1912–13 season, Bradley played and scored two tries in Wigan's 21–5 victory over Rochdale Hornets in the 1912–13 Lancashire Cup Final at Weaste, Salford, on Wednesday 11 December 1912, in front of a crowd of 6,000. On Saturday 3 May 1913, he played in the Championship Final for the second season in a row, this time held at Belle Vue, Wakefield, but the team once again lost to Huddersfield.

Before the suspension of all competitive fixtures due to World War I at the end of the 1914–15 season, Bradley had scored an average of over one try per match (118 tries in 105 appearances), helping the team win the Lancashire League for four consecutive seasons. He also finished as the club's top try scorer in 1912–13 and 1913–14, with a total of 37 and 40 tries respectively.

== First World War ==
Bradley joined the Army in 1915, but continued to play rugby for Wigan while training, and also appeared for Leeds as a guest. He made his final appearance for Wigan in February 1918, finishing his career with a total of 136 tries in 123 games. During the war, Bradley served as a Driver in the Royal Field Artillery regiment 96th Brigade unit.

On 18 June 1918, he sustained multiple shrapnel wounds while in action on the Western Front in France. Bradley later died from his wounds on 20 June 1918. He is buried in the Vignacourt British Cemetery in France, and he his honoured at the Wigan Cenotaph.
