= Joe Miller (rugby league) =

English rugby league player (1884–1956)

Personal information
- Full name: Joseph Miller
- Born: 18 May 1884 City Road, Kitt Green, Wigan, England
- Died: 1956 (aged 71–72)

Playing information
- Position: Wing
Club
Years	Team	Pld	T	G	FG	P
1907–19	Wigan	206	149	1	0	419
Representative
Years	Team	Pld	T	G	FG	P
1909–11	England	3	6	0	0	18
1911	Great Britain	1	0	0	0	0

Joseph Miller (18 May 1884 – 1956) was an English professional rugby league player who played in the 1900s and 1910s. He played at representative level for Great Britain and England, and at club level for Wigan, as a wing.

== Playing career ==
=== Championship final appearances ===
Miller played on the wing in Wigan's 7–3 victory over Oldham in the Championship Final during the 1908–09 season at The Willows, Salford on Saturday 1 May 1909.

=== County League appearances ===
Miller played in Wigan's victories in the Lancashire League during the 1908–09 season, 1910–11 season, 1911–12 season, 1912–13 season, 1913–14 season and 1914–15 season.

=== County Cup Final appearances ===
Miller played on the wing, and scored two tries in Wigan's 10–9 victory over Oldham in the 1908 Lancashire Cup Final during the 1908–09 season at Wheater's Field, Broughton, on Saturday 19 December 1908, and played on the wing, and scored two tries in the 22–5 victory over Leigh in the 1909 Lancashire Cup Final during the 1909–10 season at Wheater's Field, Broughton, on Saturday 27 November 1909.

=== Notable tour matches ===
Miller played on the wing in Wigan's 12–8 victory over New Zealand in the 1907–1908 New Zealand rugby tour of Australia and Great Britain match at Central Park, Wigan, on Saturday 9 November 1907, played on the wing in the 10–7 victory over Australia in the 1908–09 Kangaroo tour of Great Britain match at Central Park, Wigan, on Saturday 9 January 1909, played on the wing in the 16–8 victory over Australia in the 1908–09 Kangaroo tour of Great Britain match at Central Park, Wigan, on Wednesday 20 January 1909, and played on the wing in the 7–2 victory over Australia in the 1911–12 Kangaroo tour of Great Britain match at Central Park, Wigan, on Saturday 28 October 1911.

=== International honours ===
Miller won caps for England while at Wigan in 1909 against Australia, in 1910 against Wales, in 1911 against Wales, and won a cap for Great Britain while at Wigan in 1911 against Australia.
