= 1912–13 Lancashire Cup =

- Structure: Regional knockout competition
- Teams: 13
- Winners: Wigan
- Runners-up: Rochdale Hornets

The 1912 Lancashire Cup was the eighth year of this regional rugby league competition. The cup was won by Wigan who beat the holders Rochdale Hornets in the final at The Willows, Salford by a score of 21–5. The attendance at the final was 6,000 and receipts £200.

== Background ==
As in 1911 the 12 semi-professional clubs and Warwickshire side Coventry. With a total of entrants 13, there were three byes in the first round

== Competition and results ==
=== Round 1 ===
Involved 5 matches (with three byes) and 13 clubs

Game No	Fixture date	Home team	Score	Away team	Venue	Att	Rec	Notes	Ref
1	Sat 19 October 1912	Barrow	0–18	Salford	Cavendish Park				
2	Sat 19 October 1912	Runcorn	7–13	Oldham	Canal Street				
3	Sat 19 October 1912	Swinton	0–11	Broughton Rangers	Chorley Road ground				
4	Sat 19 October 1912	Widnes	36–0	Coventry	Lowerhouse Lane			1	
5	Sat 19 October 1912	Wigan	24–6	Leigh	Central Park				
6		Rochdale Hornets		bye					
7		St. Helens		bye					
8		Warrington		bye					

=== Round 2 – quarterfinals ===
Game No	Fixture date	Home team	Score	Away team	Venue	Att	Rec	Notes	Ref
1	Sat 2 November 1912	Broughton Rangers	0–0	Rochdale Hornets	Wheater's Field				
2	Sat 2 November 1912	St. Helens	18–10	Warrington	Knowsley Road				
3	Sat 2 November 1912	Salford	16–3	Widnes	The Willows				
4	Sat 2 November 1912	Wigan	24–8	Oldham	Central Park				
Replay
5	Tue 5 November 1912	Rochdale Hornets	18–4	Broughton Rangers	Athletic Grounds				

=== Round 3 – semifinals ===
Game No	Fixture date	Home team	Score	Away team	Venue	Att	Rec	Notes	Ref
1	Sat 16 November 1912	Rochdale Hornets	10–8	St. Helens	Athletic Grounds				
2	Sat 16 November 1912	Salford	5–13	Wigan	The Willows				

=== Final ===
Game No	Fixture date	Home team	Score	Away team	Venue	Att	Rec	Notes	Ref
	Wednesday 11 December 1912	Wigan	21–5	Rochdale Hornets	The Willows	6000	£200	2	

==== Teams and scorers ====
Wigan	No.	Rochdale Hornets
	teams	
Jim Sharrock	1	Johnnie Baxter
Lewis Bradley	2	Dick Paddon
Bert Jenkins	3	Jack Robinson
Lance Todd	4	Tom West
Robert Curwen	5	Jack Hopwood
Fred Gleave	6	Ernest Jones
Johnny Thomas	7	Bobby Schofield
Charlie Seeling	8	Victor Slade
Dick Ramsdale	9	Jimmie Dearden
Arthur Francis	10	Alf Turner
Percy Coldrick	11	Walter Roman
Dick Silcock	12	Tommy Woods
Thomas Whittaker	13	Sam Carter
21	score	5
10	HT	5
	Scorers	
	Tries	
Lew Bradley (2)	T	J.E. Robinson (1)
Lance Todd (1)	T	
Charlie Seeling (1)	T	
Percy Coldrick (1)	T	
	Goals	
Jim Sharrock (2)	G	H.L. Paddon (1)
Johnny Thomas (1)	G	
	Drop Goals	
	DG	
Referee		Bob Robinson (Bradford)

Scoring – Try = three (3) points – Goal = two (2) points – Drop goal = two (2) points

=== The road to success ===
First round
Barrow	0
Salford	18
Widnes	36
Coventry	9
Wigan	24
Leigh	6
Runcorn	7
Oldham	13
Swinton	0
Broughton Rangers	10
Rochdale Hornets
bye
St. Helens
bye
Warrington
bye

Second round
Salford	16
Widnes	3
Wigan	24
Oldham	8
Broughton Rangers	0(4)
Rochdale Hornets	0(18)
St. Helens	18
Warrington	10

Semifinals
Salford	5
Wigan	13
Rochdale Hornets	10
St. Helens	8

Final
Wigan	21
Rochdale Hornets	5

== See also ==
- 1912–13 Northern Rugby Football Union season

== Notes ==
- 1 According to the Widnes official archives the score was 36–0, but according to "RUGBY LEAGUE project" the score was 36–9
- 2 The Willows was the home ground of Salford
