= 1909–10 Lancashire Cup =

- Structure: Regional knockout competition
- Teams: 12
- Winners: Wigan
- Runners-up: Leigh

The 1909–10 Lancashire Cup was the fifth year of this regional rugby league competition and for the first time the defending champions retained the trophy as Wigan beat Leigh in the final at Wheater's Field, Broughton, Salford, by 22–5. The attendance at the final was 14,000 and receipts £296.

== Background ==
For the third year there were 12 teams participating in the competitions so four clubs were awarded byes in the first round.

== Fixtures and results ==
=== Round 1 ===
Involved 4 matches (with four byes) and 12 clubs

Game No	Fixture date	Home team	Score	Away team	Venue	Att	Rec	Notes	Ref
1	Sat 16 October 1909	Leigh	15–3	Barrow	Mather Lane				
2	Sat 16 October 1909	Rochdale Hornets	6–38	Oldham	Athletic Grounds				
3	Sat 16 October 1909	Widnes	4–10	St. Helens	Lowerhouse Lane			1	
4	Sat 16 October 1909	Wigan	'15–8	Warrington	Central Park				
5		Salford		bye					
6		Runcorn		bye					
7		Swinton		bye					
8		Broughton Rangers		bye					

=== Round 2 – quarterfinals ===
Game No	Fixture date	Home team	Score	Away team	Venue	Att	Rec	Notes	Ref
1	Sat 30 October 1909	Leigh	13–6	Salford	Mather Lane				
2	Sat 30 October 1909	Runcorn	9–5	Oldham	Canal Street				
3	Sat 30 October 1909	Swinton	2–0	St. Helens	Chorley Road ground				
4	Sat 30 October 1909	Wigan	16–0	Broughton Rangers	Central Park				

=== Round 3 – semifinals ===
Game No	Fixture date	Home team	Score	Away team	Venue	Att	Rec	Notes	Ref
1	Sat 13 November 1909	Leigh	11–8	Runcorn	Mather Lane				
2	Sat 13 November 1909	Swinton	0–8	Wigan	Chorley Road ground				

=== Final ===
Game No	Fixture date	Home team	Score	Away team	Venue	Att	Rec	Notes	Ref
	Saturday 27 November 1909	Wigan	22–5	Leigh	Wheater's Field	14000	£296	2, 3	

==== Teams and scorers ====
Wigan	No.	Leigh
	teams	
Jim Sharrock	1	Ellis Clarkson
Jim Leytham	2	Sam Johnson
Bert Jenkins	3	Dai Davies
Harry Price	4	Dan Isherwood (c)
Joe Miller	5	Tom Johnson
Naddy Jones	6	Mick Bolewski
Johnny Thomas	7	Frank Battersby
Dick Silcock	8	Paddy O’Neill
Dick Ramsdale	9	Aaron Lee
Tom Whittaker	10	Dick Gallop
Joseph Topping	11	Herbert Woods
Howell de Francis	12	Edward Jones
Jack Barton	13	Harry Marsh
22	score	5
5	HT	5
	Scorers	
	Tries	
Joe Miller (2)	T	Sam Johnson
Jim Leytham (1)	T	
Johnny Thomas (1)	T	
Naddy Jones (1)	T	
Howell De Francis (1)	T	
	Goals	
Jim Leytham (2)	G	Frank Battersby
	G	
	Drop Goals	
	DG	
Referee		

Scoring – Try = three (3) points – Goal = two (2) points – Drop goal = two (2) points

=== The road to success ===
First round
Swinton
bye
Widnes	4
St. Helens	10
Wigan	15
Warrington	8
Broughton Rangers
bye
Leigh	15
Barrow	3
Salford
bye
Runcorn
bye
Rochdale Hornets	6
Oldham	38

Second round
Swinton	2
St. Helens	0
Wigan	16
Broughton Rangers	0
Leigh	13
Salford	6
Runcorn	9
Oldham	5

Semifinals
Swinton	0
Wigan	8
Leigh	11
Runcorn	8

Final
Wigan	22
Leigh	5

== Notes and comments ==
- 1 The first time St Helens had won a game in the competition
- 2 Wheater's Field was the home ground of Broughton Rangers with a capacity of 20,000
- 3 Joe Millar was the first player to score more than one try in the final

== See also ==
- 1909–10 Northern Rugby Football Union season
