= Herbert Buckler =

Welsh rugby league footballer (1878–1957)

Personal information
- Full name: Herbert Buckler
- Born: 3 January 1878 Pontypool district, Wales
- Died: 23 January 1957 (aged 79) Cardiff district, Wales

Playing information
- Position: Forward
Club
| Years | Team | Pld | T | G | FG | P |
|---|---|---|---|---|---|---|
| 1900–05 | Salford | 155 | 12 | 3 | | 42 |
Representative
| Years | Team | Pld | T | G | FG | P |
| 1904–05 | Other Nationalities | 2 | 0 | 0 | 0 | 0 |
- Relatives: Arthur Buckler (brother)

Herbert Buckler (3 January 1878 – 23 January 1957) was a Welsh professional rugby league footballer who played in the 1900s. He played at representative level for Other Nationalities, and at club level for Salford, as a forward.

== Background ==
Herbert Buckler's birth was registered in Pontypool district, Wales, and his death aged 79 was registered in Cardiff district, Wales.

== International honours ==
Herbert Buckler won a cap playing as a forward for Other Nationalities in the 9–3 victory over England at Central Park, Wigan on Tuesday 5 April 1904, in the first ever international rugby league match.

== Personal life ==
Herbert Buckler was the older brother of the rugby league footballer; Arthur Buckler.
