= Thomas Whittaker (rugby league) =

English rugby league footballer

Personal information
- Full name: Thomas Whittaker
- Born: unknown
- Died: unknown

Playing information
- Position: Forward
Club
Years	Team	Pld	T	G	FG	P
1903–15	Wigan	291	22	0	0	66

Thomas "Tom" Whittaker (birth unknown – death unknown) was a professional rugby league footballer who played in the 1900s and 1910s. He played at club level for Wigan, as a forward.

== Playing career ==
=== Championship final appearances ===
Tom Whittaker played as a forward in Wigan's 7-3 victory over Oldham in the Championship Final during 1908–09 season at The Willows, Salford on Saturday 1 May 1909.

=== County League appearances ===
Tom Whittaker played in Wigan's victories in the Lancashire League during the 1908–09 season, 1910–11 season, 1911–12 season, 1912–13 season, 1913–14 season, and 1914–15 season.

=== County Cup Final appearances ===
Tom Whittaker played as a forward in Wigan's 0-0 draw with Leigh in the 1905 Lancashire Cup Final during the 1905–06 season at Wheater's Field, Broughton, on Saturday 2 December 1905, played as a forward in the 8-0 victory over Leigh in the 1905 Lancashire Cup Final replay during the 1905–06 season at Wheater's Field, Broughton, on Monday 11 December 1905, played as a forward in the 10-9 victory over Oldham in the 1908 Lancashire Cup Final during the 1908–09 season at Wheater's Field, Broughton, on Saturday 19 December 1908, played as a forward in the 22-5 victory over Leigh in the 1909 Lancashire Cup Final during the 1909–10 season at Wheater's Field, Broughton, on Saturday 27 November 1909. and played as a forward in the 21-5 victory over Rochdale Hornets in the 1912 Lancashire Cup Final during the 1912–13 season at Weaste, Salford, on Wednesday 11 December 1912.

=== Notable tour matches ===
Tom Whittaker played as a forward in Wigan's 10-7 victory over Australia in the 1908–09 Kangaroo tour of Great Britain match at Central Park, Wigan, on Saturday 9 January 1909, and played as a forward in the 16-8 victory over Australia in the 1908–09 Kangaroo tour of Great Britain match at Central Park, Wigan, on Wednesday 20 January 1909.

=== Club career ===
He made his début for Wigan in the 0-14 defeat by Hunslet F.C. at Parkside, Hunslet on Saturday 5 September 1903, he scored his first try for Wigan in the 15-3 victory over St. Helens at Central Park, Wigan on Saturday 7 January 1905, he scored his last try for Wigan in the 18-3 victory over Huddersfield in the 1911 Challenge Cup round-1 match at Fartown Ground, Huddersfield on Saturday 18 February 1911, and he played his last match for Wigan in the 4-15 defeat by Leeds in the Championship play-off semi-final match at Central Park, Wigan on Saturday 17 April 1915. During Tom Whittaker's time at Wigan, they also won the South West Lancashire League during the 1904–05 season, and 1905–06 season.
