= Billy Rhodes (Welsh rugby league) =

Wales international rugby league footballer

Personal information
- Full name: William Rhodes
- Born: unknown Wales
- Died: unknown

Playing information
- Position: Wing, Centre
Club
Years	Team	Pld	T	G	FG	P
≤1926–26	Pontypridd
1926–29	Warrington	80	31	73	0	239
	Total	80	31	73	0	239
Representative
Years	Team	Pld	T	G	FG	P
1927	Monmouthshire	≥1
1926	Wales	1

William Rhodes (birth unknown – death unknown) was a Welsh professional rugby league footballer who played in the 1920s. He played at representative level for Wales, and at club level for Pontypridd and Warrington, as a wing or centre.

== Playing career ==
=== International honours ===
Billy Rhodes won a cap for Wales while at Pontypridd in 1926.

=== County honours ===
Billy Rhodes played on the wing, and scored two tries in Monmouthshire's 14–18 defeat by Glamorgan in the non-County Championship match during the 1926–27 season at Taff Vale Park, Pontypridd on Saturday 30 April 1927.

=== Club career ===
Billy Rhodes made his début for Warrington on Saturday 18 December 1926, and he played his last match for Warrington on Saturday 30 March 1929.
