= 1905–06 Lancashire Cup =

1905 Lancashire Cup
- Structure: Regional knockout championship
- Teams: 14
- Winners: Wigan
- Runners-up: Leigh

The 1905 Lancashire Cup was the inaugural year for the rugby league Lancashire Cup competition. The cup was won by Wigan who beat Leigh in a replay at Wheater's Field, Broughton, Salford by a score of 8-0.

== Background ==
Following the great schism of 1895 which led to the formation of rugby league there was an interest in a competitive competition for clubs based in Lancashire. Prior to the breakaway from rugby union this was something that had been discouraged as it was feared that competition would lead to professionalism, as had happened in other sports like Association Football.

There appears to be very little, if any, details of how this came about, or any details of any of the instigators or of any campaign, but the County Cups became the last part of what would become known as the four cups.

The competitions were played on the same basis as was the Challenge Cup, i.e. a free draw with matches played on a sudden death straight knock-out basis, and with the final played (usually) on a neutral ground.

== Competition and results ==
=== Round 1 ===
Involved 6 matches (with two byes) and 14 Clubs.

Game No	Fixture date	Home team	Score	Away team	Venue	Att	Rec	Notes	Ref
1	Sat 14 October 1905	Barrow	11-0	Chadderton (Oldham)	Canendish Park				
2	Sat 14 October 1905	Leigh	8-0	Runcorn	Frog Hall Field, Mather Lane				
3	Sat 14 October 1905	Morecambe	0-5	Widnes	Moss Lane				
4	Sat 14 October 1905	Rochdale Hornets	0-10	Warrington	Athletic Grounds				
5	Sat 14 October 1905	Salford	3-0	Swinton	The Willows				
6	Sat 14 October 1905	Wigan	18-0	St. Helens	Central Park	8,000			
7		Broughton Rangers		bye					
8		Oldham		bye					

=== Round 2 – quarterfinals ===
Game No	Fixture date	Home team	Score	Away team	Venue	Att	Rec	Notes	Ref
1	Sat 28 October 1905	Salford	0-10	Oldham	The Willows				
2	Sat 28 October 1905	Warrington	2-5	Leigh	Wilderspool				
3	Sat 28 October 1905	Widnes	9-0	Barrow	Lowerhouse Lane				
4	Sat 28 October 1905	Wigan	4-3	Broughton Rangers	Central Park				

=== Round 3 – semifinals ===
Game No	Fixture date	Home team	Score	Away team	Venue	Att	Rec	Notes	Ref
1	Sat 18 November 1905	Oldham	7-11	Wigan	Watersheddings				
2	Wed 22 November 1905	Leigh	6-2	Widnes	Frog Hall Field, Mather Lane				

=== Final ===
The attendance was 10,000 and receipts £200. The initial final (which had taken place 9 days earlier at the same venue) had ended in a 0-0 draw before a crowd estimated at 16.000 and receipts of £400.

Game No	Fixture date	Home team	Score	Away team	Venue	Att	Rec	Notes	Ref
	Saturday 2 December 1905	Leigh	0-0	Wigan	Wheater's Field	16000	£400-0-0	2	
Replay	Monday 11 December 1905	Wigan	8-0	Leigh	Wheater's Field	10000	£200-0-0		

==== Teams and scorers ====
Wigan	№	Leigh
	Teams	
Reuben Collier	1 Prop	Paddy O'Neill
Frank Watkins	2 Hooker	Bob Berry
Anthony Little	3 Prop	Albert Blackburn
Jack Barton	4 Lock	Wilfrid Webster
Tom Whittaker	5 Lock	Aaron Lee
Dick Tyrer	6 Flanker	Dick Silcock
J. R. "Jack" Hilton	7 Flanker	Billy Winstanley (Jnr)
Sam Moores	8 Number 8	Billy Roberts
Johnny Thomas	9 Scrum Half	Sam Whittaker
Billy Anderson	10 Fly Half	Harry Dunbavin
Harry Lowe	11 Winger	Bob Neville
Windsor "Naddy" Jones	12 Centre	Herbert Bennett
Bert Jenkins	13 Centre	Tom Johnson
Jim Leytham	14 Winger	Sam Johnson
Jack Mason	15 Full Back	Ellis Clarkson
0	score	0
0	HT	0
	Referee	
	Replay	
	teams	
Reuben Collier	1 Prop	Paddy O'Neill
Frank Watkins	2 Hooker	Bob Berry
Peter Vickers	3 Prop	Albert Blackburn
Jack Barton	4 Lock	Wilfrid Webster
Tom Whittaker	5 Lock	Aaron Lee
Richard Tyrer	6 Flanker	Billy Winstanley (Jnr)
J. R. "Jack" Hilton	7 Flanker	Billy Winstanley (Snr)
Sam Moores	8 Number 8	Billy Roberts
Johnny Thomas	9 Scrum Half	Sam Whittaker
Billy Anderson	10 Fly Half	Harry Dunbavin
Harry Lowe	11 Winger	Bob Neville
Naddy Jones	12 Centre	Herbert Bennett
Bert Jenkins	13 Centre	Brady
Jim Leytham	14 Winger	Sam Johnson
Jack Mason	15 Full Back	Ellis Clarkson
8	score	0
3	HT	0
	Scorers	
	Tries	
Bert Jenkins	T	
Johnny Thomas	T	
	Goals	
Jim Leytham	G	
	Referee	

Scoring - Try = three (3) points - Goal = two (2) points - Drop goal = two (2) points

=== The road to success ===
First round
Salford	3
Swinton	0
Oldham
bye
Wigan	18
St. Helens	0
Broughton Rangers
bye
Rochdale Hornets	0
Warrington	10
Leigh	8
Runcorn	0
Morecambe	0
Widnes	5
Barrow	11
Chadderton	0

Second round
Salford	0
Oldham	10
Wigan	4
Broughton Rangers	3
Warrington	2
Leigh	5
Widnes	9
Barrow	0

Semifinals
Oldham	7
Wigan	11
Leigh	6
Widnes	2

Final
Wigan	0 (8)
Leigh	0 (0)

== See also ==
- 1905–06 Northern Rugby Football Union season
