= Dick Silcock =

English rugby league player and coach (1878–1936)

Personal information
- Full name: Richard Silcock
- Born: c. 1878 Wigan district, England
- Died: 10 June 1936 (aged 58) Wigan, England

Playing information
- Position: Forward
Club
Years	Team	Pld	T	G	FG	P
1903–06	Leigh	80	2	0	0	6
1907–19	Wigan	241	17	0	0	51
	Total	321	19	0	0	57
Representative
Years	Team	Pld	T	G	FG	P
1906	England	1	0	0	0	0
1909	Great Britain	1	0	0	0	0

Coaching information
Club
Years	Team	Gms	W	D	L	W%
1929–30	Castleford	39	11	2	26	28

Richard Silcock (c. 1878 – 10 June 1936) was an English professional rugby league footballer who played in the 1900s and 1910s, and coached in the 1920s and 1930s. He played at representative level for Great Britain and England, and at club level for Leigh and Wigan, as a forward, and coached at club level for Castleford.

== Background ==
Silcock's birth was registered in Wigan district, Lancashire, England, and he died in Wigan, Lancashire, England in 1936, aged 58.

== Playing career ==
=== Championship final appearance ===
Silcock played as a forward in Wigan's 7–3 victory over Oldham in the Championship Final during the 1908–09 season at The Willows, Salford on Saturday 1 May 1909.

=== County Cup Final appearances ===
Silcock played as a forward in Wigan's 10–9 victory over Oldham in the 1908–09 Lancashire Cup Final during the 1908–09 season at Wheater's Field, Broughton, on Saturday 19 December 1908, played as a forward in the 22–5 victory over Leigh in the 1909–10 Lancashire Cup Final during the 1909–10 season at Wheater's Field, Broughton, on Saturday 27 November 1909, and played as a forward in the 21–5 victory over Rochdale Hornets in the 1912–13 Lancashire Cup Final during the 1912–13 season at Weaste, Salford, on Wednesday 11 December 1912.

=== International honours ===
Silcock won a cap for England while at Leigh in 1906 against Other Nationalities, and won a cap for Great Britain while at Wigan in 1909 against Australia.

== Coaching career ==
Silcock was the coach of Castleford, his first game in charge was on 31 August 1929, and his last game in charge was on 22 April 1930.
