= Eli Davies =

Welsh rugby league footballer

Personal information
- Full name: Eli Davies
- Born: Wales
- Died: unknown

Playing information
- Position: Stand-off
Club
Years	Team	Pld	T	G	FG	P
1903–04	Wigan	26	2	8		22
Representative
Years	Team	Pld	T	G	FG	P
1904	Other Nationalities	1

Eli Davies (birth unknown – death unknown) was a Welsh professional rugby league footballer who played in the 1900s. He played at representative level for Other Nationalities, and at club level for Wigan, as a stand-off.

== International honours ==
Eli Davies won a cap playing stand-off for Other Nationalities in the 9-3 victory over England at Central Park, Wigan on Tuesday 5 April 1904, in the first ever international rugby league match.
