= Glyn Meredith =

Welsh rugby footballer & cricketer

Personal information
- Full name: Glyn Meredith
- Born: Wales

Playing information

Rugby union
Club
Years	Team	Pld	T	G	FG	P
≤1950–≤50	Abertillery RFC
≤1950–50	Newbridge RFC
	Total	0	0	0	0	0

Rugby league
- Position: Stand-off
Club
Years	Team	Pld	T	G	FG	P
1950–53	Wakefield Trinity	80	19	63	0	183
- Cricket career

Cricket information

Domestic team information
- Years: Team
- Glamorgan County Cricket Club
- ≤1949: Newbridge Cricket Club
- ≥1950: Wakefield Cricket Club

Glyn Meredith (birth unknown) is a Welsh cricketer, and rugby union and professional rugby league footballer who played in the 1940s and 1950s. He played representative cricket for Glamorgan County Cricket Club, and at club level for Newbridge Cricket Club and Wakefield Cricket Club at College Grove, club level rugby union (RU) for Abertillery RFC and Newbridge RFC, and club level rugby league (RL) for Wakefield Trinity, as a stand-off.

== Playing career ==
=== Rugby union club career ===
Four players from Newbridge RFC left to play rugby league for the 1949–50 Northern Rugby Football League season, they were; Tommy Harris to Hull F.C., Bill Hopkins to Hull F.C., Granville James to Hunslet, and Glyn Meredith to Wakefield Trinity.

=== County Cup Final appearances ===
Glyn Meredith played stand-off in Wakefield Trinity's 17–3 victory over Keighley in the 1951 Yorkshire Cup Final during the 1951–52 season at Fartown Ground, Huddersfield on Saturday 27 October 1951.

=== Club career ===
Glyn Meredith made his début for Wakefield Trinity during March 1950, he played his last match for Wakefield Trinity during the 1952–53 season.
