= Ponty Davies =

Wales international rugby league footballer

Personal information
- Full name: T. Percy Davies
- Born: Pontypridd, Wales
- Died: unknown

Playing information
- Position: Prop, Second-row
Club
Years	Team	Pld	T	G	FG	P
≤1926–27	Pontypridd
1927–28	Warrington	39	0	0	0	0
	Total	39	0	0	0	0
Representative
Years	Team	Pld	T	G	FG	P
1926–28	Wales	3

T. Percy Davies (birth unknown – death unknown), also known by the nickname of "Ponty", was a Welsh professional rugby league footballer who played in the 1920s. He played at representative level for Wales and at club level for Pontypridd and Warrington, as a prop or second-row.

== International honours ==
Davies won 2 caps for Wales in 1926–1927 while at Pontypridd and while at Warrington in 1928.
