= Albert Green (rugby league) =

Wales international rugby league footballer

Personal information
- Full name: Albert Green
- Born: Wales
- Died: unknown

Playing information
- Position: Prop
Club
Years	Team	Pld	T	G	FG	P
≤1926–≥27	Pontypridd
Representative
Years	Team	Pld	T	G	FG	P
1927	Monmouthshire	≥1
1926–27	Wales	2

Albert "Bert" Green (birth unknown – death unknown) was a Welsh professional rugby league footballer who played in the 1920s. He played at representative level for Wales and Monmouthshire, and at club level for Pontypridd, as a prop.

== Playing career ==
=== International honours ===
Bert Green won 2 caps for Wales in 1926–27, while at Pontypridd.

=== County honours ===
Albert Green played at prop in Monmouthshire's 14–18 defeat by Glamorgan in the non-County Championship match during the 1926–27 season at Taff Vale Park, Pontypridd on Saturday 30 April 1927.

== Notes ==
There was a professional rugby league footballer who played in the 1920s and 1930s in Australia for Bluebags and Wests named Bert Green. It is not known whether this is the same person detailed in this article.
