= George Oliver (rugby) =

Wales dual-code international rugby footballer

Personal information
- Full name: George Oliver
- Born: 3 April 1891 Pontypool, Wales
- Died: 21 July 1977 (aged 86) Pontypool, Wales

Playing information

Rugby union
- Position: Lock
Club
| Years | Team | Pld | T | G | FG | P |
|---|---|---|---|---|---|---|
| | Talywain RFC |
| | Pill Harriers RFC |
| ≤1920–21 | Pontypool RFC |
| | Total | 0 | 0 | 0 | 0 | 0 |
Representative
| Years | Team | Pld | T | G | FG | P |
| 1920 | Wales | 4 | 0 | 0 | 0 | 0 |

Rugby league
- Position: Prop, Hooker
Club
| Years | Team | Pld | T | G | FG | P |
|---|---|---|---|---|---|---|
| 1921–24 | Hull FC |
| 1926–27 | Pontypridd |
| | Total | 0 | 0 | 0 | 0 | 0 |
Representative
| Years | Team | Pld | T | G | FG | P |
| 1927 | Monmouthshire | ≥1 |
| 1921–27 | Wales | 4 |

George Oliver (3 April 1891 – 21 July 1977) was a Welsh dual-code international rugby union and professional rugby league footballer who played in the 1910s and 1920s. He played representative level rugby union (RU) for Wales, and at club level for Talywain RFC, Pill Harriers RFC and Pontypool RFC, as a lock, and representative level rugby league (RL) for Wales and Monmouthshire, and at club level for Hull FC and Pontypridd, as a prop or hooker.

== Background ==
George Oliver was born in Pontypool, Wales, and he died aged 86 in Pontypool, Wales.

== Playing career ==
=== International honours ===
George Oliver won 4 caps for Wales (RU) in 1921–1927 while at Pontypool RFC in 1920 against England, Scotland, France, and Ireland, and won caps for Wales (RL) while at Hull, and Pontypridd.

=== County honours ===
George Oliver played at prop in Monmouthshire's 14–18 defeat by Glamorgan in the non-County Championship match during the 1926–27 season at Taff Vale Park, Pontypridd on Saturday 30 April 1927.

=== Challenge Cup Final appearances ===
George Oliver played hooker in Hull FC's 9–10 defeat by Rochdale Hornets in the 1922 Challenge Cup Final during the 1921–22 season at Headingley, Leeds, in front of a crowd of 34,827.
