= Milson Hunt =

Former Wales international rugby league footballer (1926–1988)

Personal information
- Full name: Milson Hunt
- Born: third ¼ 1926; Cardiff, Wales
- Died: 1988 (aged 62); Aberdeen, Scotland

Playing information
- Position: Wing
Club
Years	Team	Pld	T	G	FG	P
≥1951–≤52	Cardiff RLFC
Representative
Years	Team	Pld	T	G	FG	P
1951	Wales	1	1	0	0	3

Milson Hunt (1926–1988) was a Welsh professional rugby league footballer who played in the 1950s. He played at representative level for Wales, and at club level for Cardiff RLFC, as a wing.

== Background ==
Milson Hunt was born in the Cardiff district of Wales in 1926.

== International honours ==
Hunt won a cap for Wales, while at Cardiff, on 1 Dec 1951 in the 1950–51 European Rugby League Championship match v Other Nationalities; scoring a try in the 11–22 defeat.

== Death ==
Hunt died in Aberdeen, Scotland in 1988, at the age of 62.
