= Bernard McNally (rugby league) =

Wales international rugby league footballer

Personal information
- Full name: Bernard McNally
- Born: Wales

Playing information
- Position: Second-row
Club
Years	Team	Pld	T	G	FG	P
≤1953–≥53	Rochdale Hornets
Representative
Years	Team	Pld	T	G	FG	P
1954	Combined Nationalities	1	0	0	0	0
1953	Wales	1	0	0	0	0

Bernard McNally (birth unknown) is a Welsh former professional rugby league footballer who played in the 1950s. He played at representative level for Wales and Combined Nationalities, and at club level for Rochdale Hornets, as a second-row.

== International honours ==
Bernard McNally represented Combined Nationalities in the 15–19 defeat by France at Stade de Gerland, Lyon on Sunday 3 January 1954 and played at second-row for Wales while at Rochdale Hornets in the 22–23 defeat by France at Stade Vélodrome, Marseille on Sunday 13 December 1953.
