= George Thomas (rugby, born 1881) =

Wales dual-code international rugby footballer

Personal information
- Full name: George W. Thomas
- Born: 1881; Pontnewydd, Wales
- Died: 3 July 1916 (aged 35); Somme, France

Playing information
- Height: 5 ft 8 in (173 cm)
- Weight: 12 st 11 lb (81 kg)

Rugby union
Club
Years	Team	Pld	T	G	FG	P
	Pontnewydd RFC
–1903	Newport RFC
	Total	0	0	0	0	0

Rugby league
- Position: Forward
Club
Years	Team	Pld	T	G	FG	P
1903–14	Warrington	385	47	199	0	539
Representative
Years	Team	Pld	T	G	FG	P
1904	Lancashire	1	0	0	0	0
1905–06	Other Nationalities	2	0	0	0	0
1908–12	Wales	2	0	1	0	2
1908	Great Britain	1	0	0	0	0

George W. Thomas (1881 – 3 July 1916), also known by the nicknames of "Ponty" and "Stitch", was a Welsh rugby union and professional rugby league footballer who played in the 1900s and 1910s. He played club rugby union (RU) for Pontnewydd RFC and Newport RFC, and representative level rugby league (RL) for Great Britain, Wales, Other Nationalities and Lancashire, and at club level for Warrington, as a goal-kicking forward.

== Background ==
George Thomas was born in Pontnewydd, Wales, he died aged 35 at the Somme on 3 July 1916 while serving with the South Lancashire Regiment of the British Army.

Thomas originally played rugby under the union code in Wales, where he represented Pontnewydd and Newport. He left Newport in 1903 to join Warrington, severing his links with rugby union.

== Playing career ==
=== International honours ===
George Thomas won international Caps while playing under the league code while at Warrington, but for three different teams. Thomas played for Wales in the country's first international when they faced the touring New Zealand All Golds at Abardare in 1908. He then faced the same touring New Zealand team later in the year, but at this point he was representing Great Britain, he also represented the Other Nationalities.

=== Challenge Cup Final appearances ===
George Thomas played as a forward in Warrington's 3–8 defeat by Halifax in the 1904 Challenge Cup Final during the 1903–04 season at The Willows, Salford on Saturday 30 April 1904, in front of a crowd of 17,041, played as a forward in the 6–0 victory over Hull Kingston Rovers in the 1905 Challenge Cup Final during the 1904–05 season at Headingley, Leeds on 29 April 1905, in front of a crowd of 19,638, played as a forward in the 17–3 victory over Oldham in the 1906–07 Challenge Cup Final during the 1906–07 season at Wheater's Field, Broughton, Salford on Saturday Saturday 27 April 1907, in front of a crowd of 18,500, and played as a forward in the 5–9 defeat by Huddersfield in the 1913 Challenge Cup Final during the 1912–13 season at Headingley, Leeds on Saturday 26 April 1913, in front of a crowd of 22,754.

=== Notable tour matches ===
George Thomas played as a forward in Warrington's 10–3 victory over Australia in the 1908–09 Kangaroo tour of Great Britain tour match during the 1908–09 season at Wilderspool Stadium, Warrington, Saturday 14 November 1908, in front of a crowd of 5,000, due to the strikes in the cotton mills, the attendance was badly affected, the loss of earnings meant that some fans could not afford to watch the first tour by the Australian rugby league team.

=== Club career ===
George Thomas transferred from Pontnewydd RFC to Newport RFC, he changed rugby football codes from rugby union to rugby league when transferred from Newport RFC to Warrington, he made his début for Warrington in the 8–3 victory over Leigh at Wilderspool Stadium, Warrington in 1903, and he played his last match for Warrington in the 5–8 defeat by Broughton Rangers at Wilderspool Stadium, Warrington in 1914.

=== Career records ===
George Thomas played as a forward, and scored 5-tries, and 9-conversions for 33-points (worth 38-points in the current 4-points per try era) in the 78–6 victory over St. Helens at Wilderspool Stadium, Warrington on Monday 12 April 1909, this remained the highest points in a match for Warrington player until Lee Briers scored 40-points (3-tries and 14-conversions) in the 84–1 victory over York Wasps in the Challenge Cup at Wilderspool Stadium, Warrington on Sunday 27 February 2000, this was subsequently extended by Lee Briers to 44-points (3-tries and 16-conversions) in the 112–0 victory over Swinton Lions in the Challenge Cup at Halliwell Jones Stadium, Warrington on Friday 20 May 2011.

== Honoured at Warrington Wolves ==
George Thomas is a Warrington Wolves Hall of Fame inductee.
