= Reginald Jones (artist) =

English painter

Reginald Jones, R.B.A (1857–1920) was an English landscape painter, who predominantly worked in oil, watercolour and pastel.

== Life and work ==
Reginald Jones lived in Eltham, Kent and also in London. He travelled widely, particularly in France, Spain and Italy, producing many paintings of the landscapes he witnessed. Jones often travelled and worked with artist friends and contemporaries including Terrick Williams and Fred Kahl.

After viewing Jones' work at the Royal Institute exhibition of March 1889, the English artist and critic Walter Sickert commented 'I am not sorry for Reginald Jones or Raven Hill. Their accomplished chic can hold its own anywhere. It is not progressive art, though a course of it might be a wholesome tonic to our stippling brigade.'

During the winter months when opportunities to travel abroad were scarce, Jones gave lessons in water-colour painting at his studio near Hyde Park, London.

In 1905 Jones married Jessie Mary Hacon (1860–1951)of Hackney, in High Wycombe. She was the daughter of the late Edward Dennis Hacon(Surgeon & GP)& Clara Turner

Jones was elected a member of the Royal Society of British Artists in 1915. He exhibited extensively at the principal London galleries from 1880 until his death in 1920.

== Exhibitions ==
Solo

- Britain and Brittany: Water-colour Drawings Continental Gallery, London, 1898
- Central France, northern Italy, & south of England: Water-colour drawings Continental Gallery, London, 1899
- Summer sun & autumn haze (French & English landscapes): Water-colour drawings Continental Gallery, London, 1901
- Busy towns & silent nature: Water-colour drawings Continental Gallery, London, 1902
- Watercolour Drawings by Reginald Jones Doré Gallery, London, 1905
- Quayside towns and English landscapes Walker's Galleries, London, 1913
- An exhibition of water-colour drawings, oils and pastels, by Reginald Jones, R.B.A Walker's Galleries, London, 1915

Group

He exhibited Silver Birch at the Royal Academy in 1906 and The Gipsy Encampment in 1907. Additionally, A Forest Stream was exhibited at Institute of Painters in Oil Colours in 1884.

The Mill Pond was exhibited at the Panama–Pacific International Exposition, San Francisco, California, 1915.
