= Wyndham Emery =

Wales international rugby league footballer

Wyndham C. Emery
Personal information
- Full name: Wyndham Clifford Emery
- Born: first ¼ 1897; Bridgend, Wales
- Died: third ¼ 1969 (aged 72); Bridgend, Wales

Playing information
- Position: Centre
Club
Years	Team	Pld	T	G	FG	P
≤1922–≥22	Leigh
Representative
Years	Team	Pld	T	G	FG	P
	Other Nationalities	1	0	0	0	0
1922	Wales	1

Wyndham C. Emery (birth registered first ¼ 1897 – 1969) was a Welsh professional rugby league footballer who played in the 1920s. He played at representative level for Wales, and Other Nationalities, and at club level for Leigh, as a centre.

== Background ==
Wyndham Emery's birth was registered in Bridgend, Wales, and he died aged 72 in Bridgend, Wales.

== International honours ==
Wyndham Emery won a cap for Wales while at Leigh in 1922, and won a cap for Other Nationalities while at Leigh.

== Marriage ==
Wyndham Emery's marriage to Ellen (née Hilton) was registered during third ¼ 1922 in Leigh district. They had children; Dorothy Emery (birth registered during second ¼ 1924 in Leigh district), and Reginald T. Emery (birth registered during second ¼ 1928 in Leigh district).
