= Charles Sage =

Welsh rugby union and rugby league footballer

Personal information
- Full name: Charles Sage
- Born: Wales
- Died: 1963; Leeds, England

Playing information
- Height: 6 ft 0 in (183 cm)
- Weight: 13 st 0 lb (83 kg)

Rugby union
Club
Years	Team	Pld	T	G	FG	P
≤1920–20	Mountain Ash RFC
Representative
Years	Team	Pld	T	G	FG	P
≤1920–≤20	Glamorgan County RFC

Rugby league
- Position: Forward
Club
Years	Team	Pld	T	G	FG	P
1920–27	Hunslet	196	11	9	0	51
Representative
Years	Team	Pld	T	G	FG	P
1925	Wales	2	0	0	0	0
1926	Other Nationalities	1	0	0	0	0

Charles "Charlie" Sage was a Welsh rugby union and professional rugby league footballer who played in the 1920s. He played representative level rugby union (RU) for Glamorgan County RFC, and at club level for Mountain Ash RFC, and representative level rugby league (RL) for Wales, and at club level for Hunslet, as a prop or hooker.

== Early life ==
Born in Wales, Sage emigrated to the United States in 1910, and later moved to Canada. He joined the Canadian Army during the First World War, and saw service in France. He returned to Wales after the war ended.

== International honours ==
Charlie Sage won caps for Wales while at Hunslet in 1925 against England (2-matches).
