= Craig Makin =

Personal information
- Born: 13 April 1973 (age 52)

Playing information
- Position: Prop
Club
| Years | Team | Pld | T | G | FG | P |
|---|---|---|---|---|---|---|
| 1994–98 | Widnes | 134 | 14 | 0 | 0 | 56 |
| 1999–2001 | Salford |
| | Total | 134 | 14 | 0 | 0 | 56 |
Representative
| Years | Team | Pld | T | G | FG | P |
| 1993 | Great Britain U-21 | 1 | 1 | 0 | 0 | 4 |
| 1999 | Wales | 2 | 0 | 0 | 0 | 0 |

Craig Makin (born 13 April 1973) is a former professional rugby league footballer who played in the 1990s and 2000s. He played at representative level for Wales, and at club level for Widnes and Salford, as a prop.

== International honours ==
Craig Makin won caps for Wales while at Salford 1999 2-caps.
