= Other Nationalities rugby league team =

Group of non-English rugby league players

Other Nationalities
Team results
- First game
- England 3–9 Other Nationalities (Wigan, England; 5 April 1904)
- Biggest win
- England 10–35 Other Nationalities (Wigan, England; 11 April 1951) Other Nationalities 30–5 Wales (Bradford, England; 7 October 1953)
- Biggest defeat
- Lancashire 36–7 Other Nationalities (St. Helens, England; 25 November 1975)

The Other Nationalities rugby league team was a rugby league representative team that usually consisted of non-English players. They competed in the first ever rugby league international in 1904, against England, fielding players from Wales and Scotland. The team was later represented by players from Australia, Fiji, Ireland, New Zealand, and South Africa. The Other Nationalities team wore green shirts.

== History ==
The Other Nationalities rugby league team was initially formed to act as opposition to England in the early days of the sport when international competition was non-existent. Matches were annual and played mid season from the first game in 1904 until 1907, the year of the first ever rugby league tour and the beginning of the sport being played in a country outside of the UK. Games then became more irregular and were mostly played as warm-up games for England ahead of tours. The final England vs Other Nationalities match was played in 1933.

Following the Second World War between 1949 and 1956, the team competed in the European Championship, at the time a double round robin competition between England, Wales, and France. The team won the 1952–53 and 1955–56 tournaments, in addition to three runners-up finishes.

The team did not play again until 1964 when they played their only match in the Southern Hemisphere in a friendly vs Sydney Colts at the Sydney Cricket Ground. The match was played as a curtain-raiser to France's third and final test against Australia on their 1964 tour of the country and was arranged in order to boost attendance aimed France's poor performances during the tour. The team was made up of foreign players playing in the NSWRL plus two Frenchmen that missed selection for France's match against Australia.

A year later, the team played a friendly against St Helens celebrating the club's first floodlit match. That year, they also played New Zealand at Selhurst Park as part of the 1965 Kiwi tour of Great Britain and France.

1974 and 1975 marked the team's final appearances, competing in the British County Championship. The team faced Lancashire, Yorkshire, and Cumbria, played each team once in both editions of the tournament they competed. The team was made up of players from outside those three counties.

== Results ==
Date	Home	Score	Away	Competition	Venue	Attendance
5 April 1904	England	3-9	Other Nationalities	Friendly	Central Park, Wigan	6,000
2 January 1905	England	26-11	Other Nationalities	Friendly	Park Avenue, Bradford	6,000
1 January 1906	England	3-3	Other Nationalities	Friendly	Central Park, Wigan	8,000
5 February 1921	England	33-16	Other Nationalities	Friendly	Lonsdale Park, Workington	
15 October 1924	England	17-23	Other Nationalities	Friendly	Headingley, Leeds	3,000
4 February 1926	England	37-11	Other Nationalities	Friendly	Recreation Ground, Whitehaven	7,000
20 March 1929	England	27-20	Other Nationalities	Friendly	Headingley, Leeds	5,000
7 April 1930	England	19-35	Other Nationalities	Friendly	Thrum Hall, Halifax	2,000
1 October 1930	England	31-18	Other Nationalities	Friendly	Knowsley Road, St Helens	10,000
30 March 1933	England	34-27	Other Nationalities	Friendly	Lonsdale Park, Workington	11,000
19 September 1949	England	7-13	Other Nationalities	1949-50 European Championship	Derwent Park, Workington	17,500
22 October 1949	Wales	5-6	Other Nationalities	1949-50 European Championship	The Park, Abertillery	2,000
15 January 1950	France	8-3	Other Nationalities	1949-50 European Championship	Stade Vélodrome, Marseille	25,000
10 December 1950	France	16-3	Other Nationalities	1950-51 European Championship	Stade du Parc Lescure, Bordeaux	28,000
31 March 1951	Wales	21-27	Other Nationalities	1950-51 European Championship	St Helens Rugby Ground, Swansea	5,000
11 April 1951	England	10-35	Other Nationalities	1950-51 European Championship	Central Park, Wigan	17,000
3 November 1951	Other Nationalities	17-14	France	1951-52 European Championship	Craven Park, Hull	18,000
1 December 1951	Wales	11-22	Other Nationalities	1951-52 European Championship	The Park, Abertillery	3,386
23 April 1952	England	31-18	Other Nationalities	1951-52 European Championship	Central Park, Wigan	20,000
18 October 1952	England	12-31	Other Nationalities	1952-53 European Championship	Fartown Ground, Huddersfield	20,000
23 November 1952	France	10-29	Other Nationalities	1952-53 European Championship	Stade Vélodrome, Marseille	18,000
15 April 1953	Other Nationalities	16-18	Wales	1952-53 European Championship	Wilderspool, Warrington	8,449
7 October 1953	Other Nationalities	30-5	Wales	1953-54 European Championship	Odsal Stadium, Bradford	14,646
18 October 1953	France	15-10	Other Nationalities	1953-54 European Championship	Stade Chaban-Delmas, Bordeaux	12,000
28 November 1953	England	30-22	Other Nationalities	1953-54 European Championship	Central Park, Wigan	19,000
12 September 1955	England	16-33	Other Nationalities	1955-56 European Championship	Central Park, Wigan	18,234
19 October 1955	Other Nationalities	32-19	France	1955-56 European Championship	Hilton Park, Leigh	7,000
18 July 1964	Sydney Colts	25-16	Other Nationalities	Curtain-raiser to Australia vs France 3rd Test	Sydney Cricket Ground, Sydney	16,731
27 January 1965	Other Nationalities	2-19	St. Helens	Friendly (switching on the floodlights)	Knowsley Road, St Helens	15,000
18 August 1965	Other Nationalities	7-15	New Zealand	1965 Kiwi Tour	Crystal Palace, London	
11 September 1974	Lancashire	14-13	Other Nationalities	1974 County Championship	The Willows, Salford	2,000
18 September 1974	Yorkshire	22-15	Other Nationalities	1974 County Championship	Craven Park, Hull	
25 September 1974	Cumbria	19-12	Other Nationalities	1974 County Championship	Recreation Ground, Whitehaven	
25 November 1975	Lancashire	36-7	Other Nationalities	1975 County Championship	Knowsley Road, St Helens	29,000
6 December 1975	Yorkshire	16-16	Other Nationalities	1975 County Championship	Odsal Stadium, Bradford	
20 December 1975	Cumbria	21-13	Other Nationalities	1975 County Championship	Craven Park, Barrow-in-Furness	

== Player statistics ==
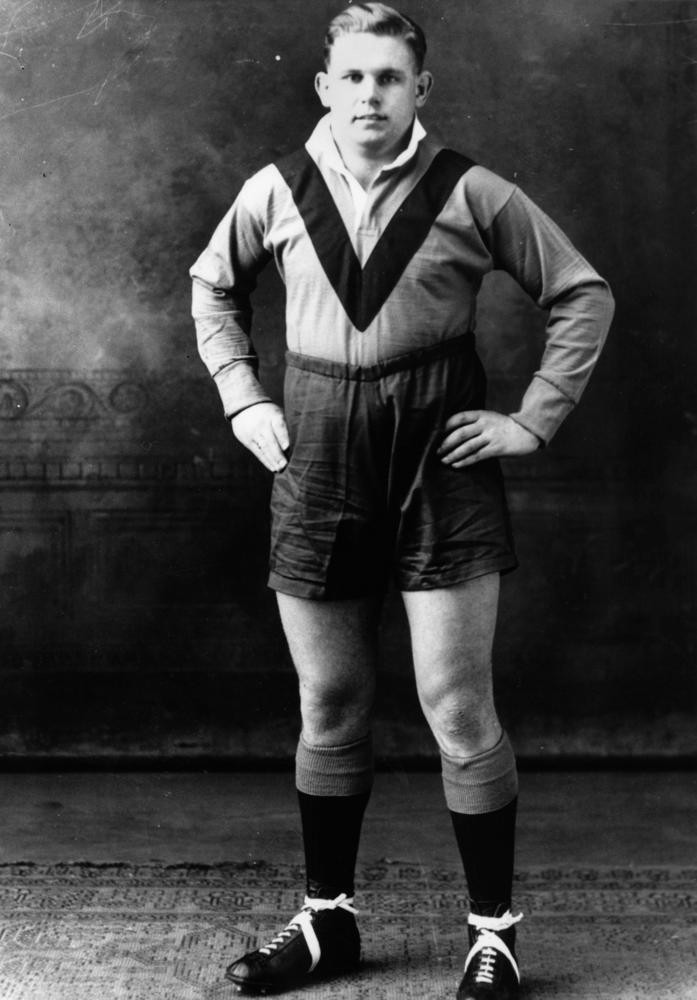
Harry Bath, born in Brisbane, Queensland, played for the Other Nationalities team whilst playing for Warrington. He kicked 20 goals, a tally that is second only to Jim Sullivan. He also scored 1 try to score 44 points overall. On returning to Australia he played for St George Dragons and coached the Australian national team, despite never playing for them.

Name	Nationality	Date of debut	Games	Tries	Goals	Drops	Points
Trevor Allan	Australia	31 March 1951	4	3	0	0	9
George Andrews	Wales	20 March 1929	1	1	0	0	3
Vic Armbruster	Australia	30 March 1933	1	1	0	0	3
Ambrose Baker	Wales	15 October 1924	1	0	0	0	0
Billy Banks	Wales	12 September 1955	2	0	0	0	0
David Barends	South Africa	18 September 1974	5	4	0	0	12
Robert Bartlett	Australia	19 September 1949	3	1	0	0	3
Harry Bath	Australia	19 September 1949	12	2	11	0	28
Jack Beames	Wales	5 February 1921	1	0	0	0	0
Jock Beattie	Scotland	15 October 1924	1	1	0	0	3
Brian Bevan	Australia	19 September 1949	16	26	0	0	78
John Bevan	Wales	11 September 1974	1	0	0	0	0
Neville Black	New Zealand	15 April 1953	3	1	0	0	3
David Booysen	South Africa	4 February 1926	1	1	0	0	3
Billy Boston	Wales	12 September 1955	2	5	0	0	15
Harold Box	England	6 December 1975	2	0	4	0	8
Phil Brady	Wales	5 April 1904	1	0	0	0	0
Frederick Brown	Wales	15 October 1924	1	0	0	0	0
Lou Brown	New Zealand	7 April 1930	2	5	0	0	15
Herbert Buckler	Wales	5 April 1904	2	0	0	0	0
Jeff Burke	Australia	3 November 1951	2	0	0	0	0
Joe Busch	Australia	30 March 1933	1	1	0	0	3
Brian Butler	Wales	11 September 1974	3	0	0	0	0
Tony Cheshire	England	25 September 1974	2	0	0	0	0
Ian Clark	South Africa	10 December 1950	1	0	0	0	0
Arthur Clues	Australia	22 October 1949	14	2	3	0	12
Percy Coldrick	Wales	5 February 1921	1	0	0	0	0
Bert Cook	New Zealand	10 December 1950	2	0	3	0	6
Lionel Cooper	Australia	19 September 1949	14	13	0	0	39
Kel Coslett	Wales	11 September 1974	1	0	2	0	4
Mike Coulman	England	25 November 1975	1	0	0	0	0
Dennis Curling	Wales	25 September 1974	1	0	0	0	0
John Daly	Ireland	15 January 1950	7	1	0	0	3
Dai Davies	Wales	7 April 1930	1	2	0	0	6
Dan Davies	Wales	1 January 1906	1	0	0	0	0
Eli Davies	Wales	5 April 1904	1	0	0	0	0
Willie Davies	Wales	5 February 1921	1	0	0	0	0
Bob Dawson	Australia	28 November 1953	1	0	0	0	0
Howell de Francis	Wales	1 January 1906	1	0	0	0	0
James Dechan	Scotland	2 January 1905	1	1	0	0	3
Pat Devery	Australia	19 September 1949	11	5	16	0	47
Bakary Diabira	France	11 September 1974	3	2	0	0	6
Colin Dixon	Wales	18 September 1974	1	1	0	0	3
Jimmy Douglas	Scotland	30 March 1933	1	0	0	0	0
Dai Edwards	Wales	4 February 1926	1	0	0	0	0
Wally Ellean	Australia	15 April 1953	4	1	0	0	3
Neville Elwin	Australia	20 December 1975	1	0	0	0	0
Wyndham Emery	Wales	5 February 1921	1	0	0	0	0
Frank Evans	Wales	15 October 1924	2	1	0	0	3
Keith Fielding	England	11 September 1974	1	1	0	0	3
Tony Fisher	Wales	18 September 1974	1	0	0	0	0
Bob Fleay	Wales	18 September 1974	1	0	0	0	0
Chris Forster	England	6 December 1975	2	0	0	0	0
Ike Fowler	Wales	4 February 1926	1	0	0	0	0
Rudi Francis	West Indies	25 September 1974	3	0	0	0	0
George Frater	Scotland	5 April 1904	1	0	0	0	0
Albert Freear	Ireland	2 January 1905	1	0	0	0	0
Stuart Gallacher	Wales	11 September 1974	3	0	0	0	0
Bruce Gibbs	Australia	25 November 1975	3	0	0	0	0
Jimmy Gill	Scotland	7 April 1930	1	0	0	0	0
Bryn Goldswain	Wales	19 October 1955	1	2	0	0	6
Bernard Gould	Wales	5 February 1921	1	0	0	0	0
John Gray	England	11 September 1974	1	1	0	0	3
Ben Gronow	Wales	5 February 1921	2	1	5	0	13
Gomer Gunn	Wales	2 January 1905	2	0	1	0	2
Trevor Hall	New Zealand	7 April 1930	1	1	0	0	3
Roy Hardgrave	New Zealand	1 October 1930	2	1	0	0	3
Dai Harris	Wales	5 April 1904	1	1	0	0	3
Eric Harris	Australia	30 March 1933	1	2	0	0	6
John Hegarty	Scotland	25 November 1975	1	0	0	0	0
Peter Henderson	New Zealand	31 March 1951	5	4	0	0	12
Clive Hill	Wales	6 December 1975	2	0	0	0	0
Wilf Hodder	Wales	4 February 1926	1	0	0	0	0
Andy Hogg	Scotland	1 January 1906	1	0	0	0	0
Will Hopkins	Wales	2 January 1905	1	0	0	0	0
Johnny Hunter	Australia	22 October 1949	8	0	1	0	2
Danny Hurcombe	Wales	15 October 1924	2	0	0	0	0
Lou Hutt	New Zealand	7 April 1930	2	1	0	0	3
Duncan Jackson	Australia	19 September 1949	5	0	0	0	0
Granville James	Wales	19 October 1955	1	0	0	0	0
Sam James	Wales	2 January 1905	2	0	0	0	0
Willie James	Wales	1 January 1906	1	1	0	0	3
Francis Jarvis	Dominica	11 September 1974	2	0	0	0	0
David Jenkins	Wales	20 March 1929	1	0	0	0	0
Emlyn Jenkins	Wales	30 March 1933	1	0	0	0	0
Sid Jerram	Wales	5 February 1921	2	0	0	0	0
Clive Jones	Wales	25 September 1974	1	0	0	0	0
Joe Jones	Wales	15 October 1924	1	1	0	0	3
Lewis Jones	Wales	12 September 1955	2	1	10	0	23
Windsor Jones	Wales	1 January 1906	1	0	0	0	0
Fred Jowett	Wales	1 January 1906	1	0	0	0	0
Ken Kearney	Australia	19 September 1949	4	0	0	0	0
Bob Kelly	Ireland	12 September 1955	2	0	0	0	0
Cec Kelly	Australia	3 November 1951	5	1	0	0	3
Bill Kilpatrick	Ireland	1 October 1930	1	0	0	0	0
Roy Kinnear	Scotland	20 March 1929	3	3	0	0	9
John Knighton	England	25 November 1975	2	0	0	0	0
Alex Laidlaw	Scotland	2 January 1905	1	0	0	0	0
David Lewis	Wales	5 April 1904	1	0	0	0	0
Andrew Little	Scotland	1 January 1906	1	0	0	0	0
Tom Llewellyn	Wales	5 April 1904	3	1	0	0	3
Tommy Lynch	New Zealand	23 November 1952	4	1	0	0	3
John Mantle	Wales	11 September 1974	1	0	0	0	0
Steve Martin	Australia	6 December 1975	2	0	0	0	0
Len Mason	New Zealand	20 March 1929	4	2	0	0	6
Tom McKinney	Northern Ireland	11 April 1951	8	0	0	0	0
Bob McMaster	Australia	19 September 1949	6	0	0	0	0
Jesse Meredith	Wales	1 October 1930	1	0	0	0	0
Ernie Mills	Australia	20 March 1929	2	1	0	0	3
Jim Mills	Wales	18 September 1974	1	0	0	0	0
Jim Moffatt	Scotland	5 April 1904	1	0	0	0	0
Richard Moncrieff	Australia	25 November 1975	1	0	0	0	0
Jeff Moores	Australia	20 March 1929	2	0	0	0	0
Glyn Moses	Wales	12 September 1955	2	0	0	0	0
Rex Mossop	Australia	18 October 1953	2	0	0	0	0
Ces Mountford	New Zealand	22 October 1949	5	0	0	0	0
Johnny Mudge	Australia	19 September 1949	13	1	0	0	3
Andrew Murdison	Scotland	4 February 1926	1	1	0	0	3
Brian Nordgren	New Zealand	15 January 1950	1	0	0	0	0
Frank O'Rourke	Australia	20 March 1929	2	0	0	0	0
Will Osborne	Wales	2 January 1905	2	0	0	0	0
Jack Pansegrouw	South Africa	19 September 1949	1	0	0	0	0
Tommy Parker	Wales	15 October 1924	1	0	0	0	0
Don Parry	England	25 November 1975	3	0	0	0	0
Tony Paskins	Australia	19 September 1949	11	2	0	0	6
Johnny Payne	Australia	22 October 1949	1	0	0	0	0
Joe Phillips	New Zealand	15 April 1953	4	0	12	0	24
Ron Pomering	Australia	25 November 1975	2	0	0	0	0
Wickham Powell	Wales	5 February 1921	1	0	0	0	0
Ray Price	Wales	12 September 1955	2	1	0	0	3
Ike Proctor	New Zealand	31 March 1951	1	1	0	0	3
Billo Rees	Wales	20 March 1929	2	0	0	0	0
Dai Rees	Wales	2 January 1905	2	0	0	0	0
Dai Rees	Wales	2 January 1905	1	0	0	0	0
Dai Rees	Wales	4 February 1926	1	0	0	0	0
Jack Rhapps	Wales	5 April 1904	1	0	0	0	0
Johnny Ring	Wales	4 February 1926	1	0	0	0	0
Jack Robinson	New Zealand	7 October 1953	3	2	0	0	6
Bob Robson	Scotland	15 January 1950	3	0	0	0	0
Johnny Rogers	Wales	5 February 1921	1	1	0	0	3
Peter Rowe	Wales	18 September 1974	5	1	0	0	3
Charlie Sage	Wales	4 February 1926	1	0	0	0	0
Jim Scott	Scotland	2 January 1905	1	0	0	0	0
Bill Shankland	Australia	30 March 1933	1	0	0	0	0
Tom Sheppard	Australia	25 November 1975	1	0	0	0	0
Frank Shugars	Wales	1 January 1906	1	0	0	0	0
Dan Smith	Wales	5 April 1904	1	0	0	0	0
Bob Smithies	England	18 September 1974	1	0	0	0	0
Gary Souter	Australia	6 December 1975	2	0	0	0	0
Frank Stephens	England	20 March 1929	1	0	0	0	0
Jim Sullivan	Wales	15 October 1924	6	0	22	0	44
George Swan	Scotland	4 February 1926	1	0	0	0	0
Alan Tait	Scotland	25 November 1975	1	0	0	0	0
Billy Thomas	Wales	1 October 1930	1	0	0	0	0
Dai Thomas	Wales	5 April 1904	2	1	0	0	3
Gwyn Thomas	Wales	5 February 1921	1	0	0	0	0
Phil Thomas	Wales	2 January 1905	1	1	0	0	3
Trevor Thomas	Wales	30 March 1933	1	0	0	0	0
George Thomas	Wales	2 January 1905	2	0	0	0	0
Willie Thomas	Wales	5 April 1904	1	1	0	0	3
Joe Thompson	England	15 October 1924	5	1	0	0	3
John Thorley	Wales	12 September 1955	2	0	0	0	0
Dave Valentine	Scotland	19 September 1949	16	3	0	0	9
Rob Valentine	Scotland	11 September 1974	1	0	0	0	0
Attie van Heerden	South Africa	15 October 1924	1	2	0	0	6
George van Rooyen	South Africa	15 October 1924	1	0	0	0	0
Ted Verrenkamp	Australia	23 April 1952	1	0	0	0	0
Green Vigo	South Africa	18 September 1974	5	2	0	0	6
Dick Wallace	England	11 September 1974	6	3	0	1	10
Emlyn Watkins	Wales	20 March 1929	2	0	0	0	0
Frank Watkins	Wales	1 January 1906	1	0	0	0	0
Derek Watts	England	25 November 1975	1	0	0	0	0
Les White	Wales	20 March 1929	4	1	0	0	3
George Whitney	Wales	5 February 1921	1	0	0	0	0
Ray Wilkins	Wales	11 September 1974	3	0	6	0	12
Billy Williams	Wales	1 October 1930	1	0	0	0	0
Bryn Williams	Wales	5 February 1921	1	0	0	0	0
Evan Williams	Wales	7 April 1930	1	0	0	0	0
David Willicombe	Wales	11 September 1974	4	0	0	0	0
Fred Willis	Wales	5 February 1921	1	0	0	0	0
Bevan Wilson	Australia	7 October 1953	3	0	0	0	0
Frank Wilson	Wales	11 September 1974	2	2	0	0	6
George Wilson	Scotland	19 September 1949	1	1	0	0	3

== Other teams ==
Throughout history there have been several other teams created using a similar concept.

=== Combined Nationalities ===
The Combined Nationalities rugby league team a rugby league team created to play an international fixture against France in 1954. The team comprised European-based (or in the case of the United States players, European touring) non-French rugby league footballers.

The team lost 15-19 during the match at Stade de Gerland, Lyon, on Sunday 3 January 1954.

Starting XIII

- (United Kingdom) Billy Banks
- (Australia) Lionel Cooper
- (United Kingdom) Gerry Helme
- (United States) Bob Lampshire
- (United Kingdom) Tom McKinney
- (Australia) Keith McLellan
- (United Kingdom) Bernard McNally
- (United Kingdom) Owen Phillips
- (United States) Willie Richardson
- (United States) Leon Sellers
- (United Kingdom) Dave Valentine
- (Italy) Giovanni Vigna
- (United Kingdom) Ernest Ward

=== Combined Nations All Stars ===
The Combined Nations All Stars were created following the COVID-19 pandemic as opposition to England using UK based players as international travel was still restricted. The team played twice with the following results:

Date	Opponent	Score	Location	Attendance	Ref.
25 June 2021	England	24–26	(England) Halliwell Jones Stadium, Warrington	4,000 (restricted capacity)	
18 June 2022	England	18–4	(England) Halliwell Jones Stadium, Warrington	9,393	

==== 2021 Team ====
1. Jake Connor 2. Ken Sio 3. Peter Mata'utia 4. Ricky Leutele 5. Jermaine McGillvary 6. Jackson Hastings 7. Aidan Sezer 8. Matt Prior 9. Nathan Peats 10. Tevita Satae 11. Kenny Edwards 12. Kelepi Tanginoa 13. Luke Yates Subs 14. Kruise Leeming 15. Pauli Pauli 16. Suaia Matagi 17. Andre Savelio

==== 2022 Team ====
1. Peter Mata'utia 2. Ken Sio 3. Rhyse Martin 4. Kenny-Dowall 5. Mahe Fonua 6. Jacob Miller 7. Brodie Croft 8. Ligi Sao 9. Daryl Clark 10. Zane Tetevano 11. Kenny Edwards 12. Kelepi Tanginoa 13. Matt Prior Subs 14. Kruise Leeming 15. Joe Lovodua 16. Tevita Satae 17. David Fifita

== See also ==
- Rest of the world
