= Willie Thomas (rugby league) =

Wales international rugby league footballer (1881–1963)

Personal information
- Full name: William Thomas
- Born: 1881 Wales
- Died: 1963 (aged 81–82)

Playing information
- Position: Centre
Club
Years	Team	Pld	T	G	FG	P
1903	Oldham	9	1	0	0	3
1903–21	Salford	501	99	68		433
	Total	510	100	68	0	436
Representative
Years	Team	Pld	T	G	FG	P
1904	Other Nationalities	1	1	0	0	3
1911	Wales	1	0	0	0	0

William Strother Thomas (1881–1963) was a Welsh professional rugby league footballer who played in the 1900s, 1910s and 1920s. He played at representative level for Wales, and at club level for Oldham RLFC and Salford, as a centre.

== Playing career ==
=== International honours ===
Willie Thomas won a cap for Wales while at Salford in 1911.

=== Championship final appearances ===
During Willie Thomas' time there was Salford's 5–3 victory over Huddersfield in the Championship Final during the 1913–14 season.

=== Challenge Cup Final appearances ===
Willie Thomas played at centre in Salford's 0–5 defeat by Bradford F.C. in the 1906 Challenge Cup Final during the 1905–06 season at Headingley, Leeds on Saturday 28 April 1906.
