= Owen Phillips (rugby league) =

Wales international rugby league footballer

Personal information
- Full name: Owen Phillips
- Born: Swansea, Glamorgan, Wales

Playing information
- Position: Prop
Club
Years	Team	Pld	T	G	FG	P
≤1951–≥53	Swinton
Representative
Years	Team	Pld	T	G	FG	P
1954	Combined Nationalities	1
1951–53	Wales	6

Owen Phillips (birth unknown) is a Welsh former professional rugby league footballer who played in the 1950s. He played at representative level for Wales and Combined Nationalities, and at club level for Swinton, as a prop.

== International honours ==
Owen Phillips represented Combined Nationalities in the 15–19 defeat by France at Stade de Gerland, Lyon on Sunday 3 January 1954, and won caps for Wales while at Swinton in 1951 against England, Other Nationalities, and New Zealand, in 1952 against France (2 matches), and in 1953 against England.
