= Fred Willis (rugby league) =

Wales international rugby league & union footballer

Personal information
- Full name: Frederick Willis
- Born: Wales

Playing information

Rugby union
Club
| Years | Team | Pld | T | G | FG | P |
|---|---|---|---|---|---|---|
| | Newport RFC |

Rugby league
- Position: Prop
Club
| Years | Team | Pld | T | G | FG | P |
|---|---|---|---|---|---|---|
| 1920–21 | Batley | 31 | 0 | 0 | 0 | 0 |
Representative
| Years | Team | Pld | T | G | FG | P |
| 1921 | Wales | 1 | 0 | 0 | 0 | 0 |
| 1921 | Other Nationalities | 1 | 0 | 0 | 0 | 0 |

Frederick "Fred" Willis (birth unknown – death unknown) was a Welsh rugby union and professional rugby league footballer who played in the 1920s. He played club level rugby union (RU) for Newport RFC, and representative level rugby league (RL) for Wales, and at club level for Batley, as a prop.

== Rugby career ==
Willis joined rugby league club Batley, making his debut in 1920.

He won a cap for Wales while at Batley in 1921.
