= Dai Maidment =

Wales international rugby league footballer

David Maidment
Personal information
- Full name: David Maidment
- Born: Wales
- Died: unknown

Playing information
- Position: Loose forward
Club
Years	Team	Pld	T	G	FG	P
Aug 1928–≥28	Wakefield Trinity	86	20	0	0	60
Representative
Years	Team	Pld	T	G	FG	P
1928	Wales	1	0	0	0	0
- Source: As of 29 March 2010

David "Dai" Maidment (birth unknown – death unknown) was a Welsh professional rugby league footballer who played in the 1920s. He played at representative level for Wales, and at club level for Wakefield Trinity, as a loose forward.

== International honours ==
Dai Maidment won a cap for Wales while at Wakefield Trinity in the 15–39 defeat by England at White City Stadium, Sloper Road, Grangetown, Cardiff on Wednesday 14 November 1928.
