= Ralph Green (rugby) =

Wales international rugby league footballer

Personal information
- Full name: Ralph Green (Note: He sometimes is erroneously referred to as Roger Green.)
- Born: 6 March 1909 Machen, Wales
- Died: 1963

Playing information

Rugby union
Club
Years	Team	Pld	T	G	FG	P
	Machen RFC
1929–31	Newport RFC
	Total	0	0	0	0	0

Rugby league
- Position: Loose forward
Club
Years	Team	Pld	T	G	FG	P
1931–33	Dewsbury
1933–34	Leeds	34	0	26	0	52
1934–36	Bradford Northern	50	1	5	2	17
	Total	84	1	31	2	69
Representative
Years	Team	Pld	T	G	FG	P
1933	Wales	1	0	0	0	0

Ralph Green (1909 – 1963) was a Welsh rugby union and rugby league footballer who played in the 1930s. He played at representative level for Wales, and at club level for Leeds, as a loose forward.

== Playing career ==
Green began playing rugby union for Machen RFC before joining Newport RFC in 1929. In September 1931, he joined English rugby league club Dewsbury. He was transferred to Leeds in January 1933.

== International honours ==
Green won a cap for Wales while at Leeds in 1933 against Australia.
