= Norman Pugh =

Wales international rugby league & union footballer

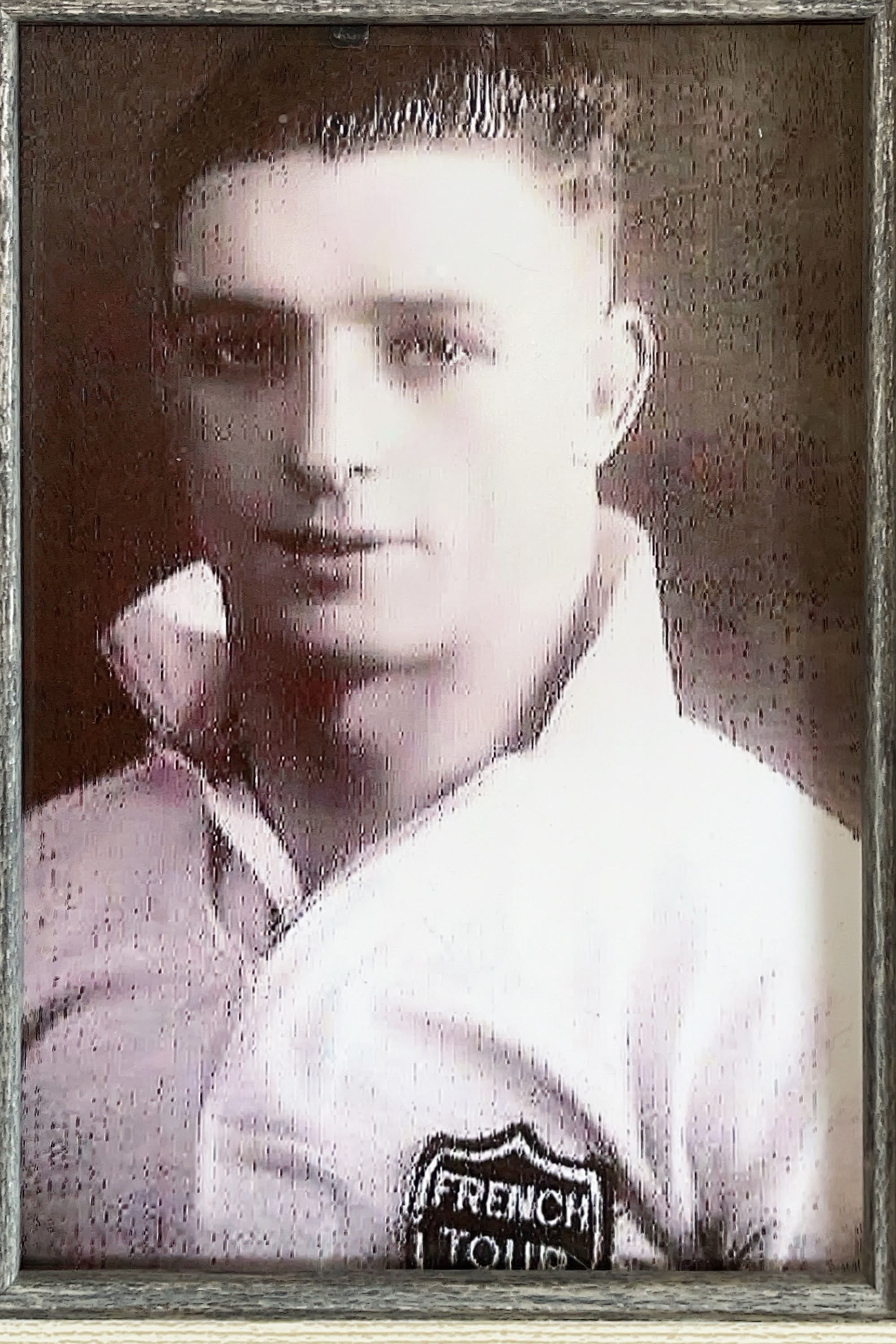

Personal information
- Full name: Norman Pugh
- Born: 3 April 1911 Godre'r Graig, Neath Port Talbot, Wales
- Died: unknown

Playing information

Rugby union
Club
Years	Team	Pld	T	G	FG	P
≤1933–33	Swansea RFC
Representative
Years	Team	Pld	T	G	FG	P
≤1933–≤33	Glamorgan

Rugby league
- Position: Second-row, Loose forward
Club
Years	Team	Pld	T	G	FG	P
1933–48	Oldham	363	139	1		119
Representative
Years	Team	Pld	T	G	FG	P
1935–38	Wales	6

Norman Pugh (3 April 1911 – death unknown), also known by the nickname of "The Whip", was a Welsh rugby union and professional rugby league footballer who played in the 1930s and 1940s. He played representative level rugby union (RU) for Glamorgan, and at club level for Swansea RFC, and representative level rugby league (RL) for Wales, and at club level for Oldham (captain), as a second-row or loose forward.

== Background ==
Norman Pugh was born in Godre'r Graig, Neath Port Talbot, Wales.

== International honours ==
Norman Pugh won 6 caps for Wales in 1935–1938 while at Oldham.
