= Richard Wallace (rugby league) =

Wales international rugby league footballer

Dick Wallace
Personal information
- Full name: Richard Wallace
- Born: 1944 (age 80–81); Bristol, England

Playing information

Rugby union
Club
Years	Team	Pld	T	G	FG	P
196?–66	Bristol Rugby

Rugby league
- Position: Fullback, Centre, Stand-off
Club
Years	Team	Pld	T	G	FG	P
1966–72	Huddersfield	157	14	76	0	194
1972–75	York	92	14	22	6	92
1975–77	Hull Kingston Rovers	43+4	3	0	2	11
	Total	296	31	98	8	297
Representative
Years	Team	Pld	T	G	FG	P
1974–75	Other Nationalities	6
1975	Wales	1	0	0	0	0

Richard "Dick" Wallace (born 1944) is a former rugby union and professional rugby league footballer who played in the 1970s. He played club level rugby union (RU) for Bristol Rugby, and representative level rugby league (RL) for Wales and Other Nationalities, and at club level for Huddersfield, York and Hull Kingston Rovers, as a fullback, centre, or stand-off.

== Playing career ==
=== Club career ===
Wallace joined Huddersfield from rugby union in 1966. He made 157 appearances for the club before moving to York in 1972. He played a further 92 games for York before moving to Hull Kingston Rovers in 1975.

Wallace played stand-off in Hull Kingston Rovers' 11-15 defeat by Leeds in the 1975 Yorkshire Cup Final during the 1975–76 season at Headingley, Leeds on Saturday 15 November 1975.

=== Representative honours ===
Although born in England, Wallace was eligible to play for Wales through his Welsh grandparents. Wallace won a cap for Wales (RL) while at York in the 1975 Rugby League World Cup against France. He also represented Other Nationalities six times in the 1974 and 1975 county championships.
