= Howell de Francis =

Wales international rugby league footballer

Personal information
- Full name: Howell de Francis
- Born: 5 October 1878 Gwar y ceaua, Port Talbot, Wales
- Died: 3 April 1966 (aged 87) Wigan, Greater Manchester, England

Playing information
- Position: Forward
Club
Years	Team	Pld	T	G	FG	P
1904–07	Bradford F.C.	72	10	6		42
1907–08	Bradford Northern	21	6	4		26
1908–11	Wigan	74	23	1		71
	Total	167	39	11	0	139
Representative
Years	Team	Pld	T	G	FG	P
1906	Other Nationalities	1	0	0	0	0
1908–09	Wales	2

Howell de Francis (1878-1966) was a Welsh professional rugby league footballer who played in the 1900s and 1910s. He played at representative level for Wales, and at club level for Bradford Northern and Wigan, as a forward.

== Background ==
Howell de Francis was born in Port Talbot, Wales, in 1878. In 1911 he was a lodger in the house of George and Matilda Scott at 17, Kimberley St Wigan. He married Janet Halliwell in 1912. After her death in 1913 he married Johanna Simpson Williams in 1915.

== Playing career ==
=== International honours ===
Howell de Francis won caps for Wales while at Wigan in 1908 against New Zealand, and in 1909 against England.

=== Championship final appearances ===
Howell de Francis played as a forward in Wigan's 7-3 victory over Oldham in the Championship Final during the 1908–09 season at The Willows, Salford on Saturday 1 May 1909.

=== County Cup Final appearances ===
Howell de Francis played as a forward and scored a try in Wigan's 22-5 victory over Leigh in the 1909 Lancashire Cup Final during the 1909–10 season at Wheater's Field, Broughton, on Saturday 27 November 1909.

=== Club career ===
Howell de Francis was considered a "Probable" for the 1910 Great Britain Lions tour of Australia and New Zealand, but ultimately he was not selected for the tour.
