= Granville James =

Wales international rugby league footballer

Personal information
- Full name: Granville James
- Born: 16 March 1927 Wales
- Died: 18 January 2008 (aged 80)

Playing information

Rugby union
Club
Years	Team	Pld	T	G	FG	P
≤1949–49	Newbridge RFC

Rugby league
- Position: Loose forward
Club
Years	Team	Pld	T	G	FG	P
1949–57	Hunslet	172	61	0	0	183
Representative
Years	Team	Pld	T	G	FG	P
1955	Other Nationalities	1	0	0	0	0
1950–53	Wales	5	1	0	0	3

Granville James (16 March 1927 – 18 January 2008) was a Welsh rugby union, and professional rugby league footballer who played in the 1940s and 1950s. He played club level rugby union (RU) for Newbridge RFC, and representative level rugby league (RL) for Wales and Other Nationalities, and at club level for Hunslet, as a loose forward.

== Club career ==
Four players from Newbridge RFC left to play rugby league for the 1949–50 Northern Rugby Football League season, they were; Tommy Harris to Hull FC, Bill Hopkin to Hull FC, Granville James to Hunslet and Glyn Meredith to Wakefield Trinity.

== International honours ==
In rugby league, James won five caps for Wales in 1950–1953 while at Hunslet, and won one cap for Other Nationalities while at Hunslet in the 32-19 victory over France at Hilton Park, Leigh on Monday 19 September 1955.
