= George Whitney (rugby league) =

Wales international rugby league footballer

Personal information
- Full name: George Whitney
- Born: Wales
- Died: unknown

Playing information
- Position: Loose forward
Club
Years	Team	Pld	T	G	FG	P
1921–25	Salford	109	13	0	0	39
Representative
Years	Team	Pld	T	G	FG	P
1921	Other Nationalities	1
1921	Wales	2

George Whitney as a Welsh professional rugby league footballer who played in the 1920s. He played at representative level for Wales and Other Nationalities, and at club level for Salford, as a loose forward.

== International honours ==
In 1921, George Whitney won two caps for Wales while at Salford, and also made one appearance for Other Nationalities.
