= Arthur Buckler =

Wales international rugby league footballer (1882-1921)

Personal information
- Full name: Arthur Buckler
- Born: 24 April 1882 Newport district, Wales
- Died: 19 March 1921 (aged 38) Newport district, Wales

Playing information
- Position: Forward
Club
Years	Team	Pld	T	G	FG	P
1904–15	Salford	189	15	0	0	45
Representative
Years	Team	Pld	T	G	FG	P
1908	Wales	1	0	0	0	0
- Relatives: Herbert Buckler (brother)

Arthur Buckler (24 April 1882 – 19 March 1921) was a Welsh professional rugby league footballer who played in the 1900s and 1910s. He played at representative level for Wales, and at club level for Salford, as a forward.

== Background ==
Arthur Buckler's birth was registered in Newport district, Wales, and his death aged 38 was registered in Newport district, Wales.

== International honours ==
Arthur Buckler won a cap for Wales while at Salford in 1908 against England.

== Personal life ==
Arthur Buckler was the younger brother of the rugby league footballer; Herbert Buckler.
