= Len Orchard =

Wales international rugby league footballer

Personal information
- Full name: Leonard Orchard
- Born: second ¼ 1912; Newport, Wales
- Died: unknown

Playing information
- Position: Wing
Club
Years	Team	Pld	T	G	FG	P
≤1935–≥35	Keighley
Representative
Years	Team	Pld	T	G	FG	P
1935	Wales	1	1	0	0	3

Leonard Orchard (second ¼ 1912 – death unknown) was a Welsh professional rugby league footballer who played in the 1930s. He played at representative level for Wales, and at club level for Keighley, as a wing.

== Background ==
Len Orchard's birth was registered in Newport, Wales.

== International honours ==
Len Orchard won a cap for Wales while at Keighley, and scored a try in the 11-24 defeat by England at Anfield, Liverpool on Wednesday 10 April 1935.
