= Dai Rees (rugby, born c. 1885) =

Wales international rugby league & union footballer

David Rees
Personal information
- Full name: David Rees
- Born: 1885 Fishguard, Wales
- Died: unknown

Playing information

Rugby union
Club
Years	Team	Pld	T	G	FG	P
≤1904–04	Penygraig RFC

Rugby league
- Position: Forward
Club
Years	Team	Pld	T	G	FG	P
1904–12	Salford	198	14	0	0	42
Representative
Years	Team	Pld	T	G	FG	P
1905–06	Other Nationalities	2	0	0	0	0
1908	Wales	2	0	0	0	0

David "Dai" Rees (birth unknown – death unknown) was a Welsh rugby union and professional rugby league footballer who played in the 1900s and 1910s. He played club level rugby union (RU) for Penygraig RFC, and representative level rugby league (RL) for Wales, and at club level for Salford, as a forward.

== Background ==
Dai Rees was born in Dinas Cross, Fishguard, Wales.

== Playing career ==
=== International honours ===
Dai Rees won two caps for Wales while at Salford in 1908.

=== Challenge Cup Final appearances ===
Dai Rees played as a forward in Salford's 0–5 defeat by Bradford F.C. in the 1906 Challenge Cup Final during the 1905–06 season at Headingley, Leeds on Saturday 28 April 1906.
