= Dennis Curling =

Wales international rugby league footballer

Personal information
- Full name: Dennis Roy Curling
- Born: 17 December 1949 (age 76) Wales

Playing information

Rugby union
- Position: Wing
Club
Years	Team	Pld	T	G	FG	P
1970–72	Aberavon RFC

Rugby league
- Position: Wing
Club
Years	Team	Pld	T	G	FG	P
1972–77	Warrington	132	35	0	0	105
Representative
Years	Team	Pld	T	G	FG	P
1974	Other Nationalities	1
1977	Wales	1

Dennis Curling (born 17 December 1949) is a Welsh former rugby union and professional rugby league footballer who played in the 1970s. He played club level rugby union (RU) for Aberavon RFC, as a wing, and representative level rugby league (RL) for Wales, and at club level for Warrington, as a wing. His career was ended by a broken neck.

== International honours ==
Dennis Curling won a cap for Wales (RL) while at Warrington in 1977 (interchange/substitute).
