= Pontypridd RLFC =

Defunct Welsh rugby league club, based in Pontypridd

Club information
- Founded: 1926
- Exited: 1927

Former details
- Ground(s): Taff Vale Park

Pontypridd RLFC was a professional rugby league team based in Pontypridd, Wales, which played for one full season in the Rugby Football League, finishing 27th out of 29 teams in 1926-27, before withdrawing early in the following season.

== History ==
The club was formed following the hosting, at the instigation of the owners of Taff Vale Park, of a highly successful rugby league international in Pontypridd on 12 April, in which England played Wales in front of 22,000 people. The current tenants of Taff Fale Park, the Pontypridd association football club was in a perilous financial position and eventually folded at the end of the 1925/26 season.

Pontypridd Rugby League Club was formed and admission was sought to the Rugby Football League (RFL) in June 1926, the council of which agreed and also set up a Rugby League Commission for Wales to develop the sport in the principality. A supporters’ club was formed in August and by September it had over 500 members. The team attracted an average attendance in its first season of around 5,000, dropping to around 3,000 in the aborted second season.

=== County match ===
Pontypridd RLFC supplied all of the Welsh-based players utilised by both sides in Glamorgan's 18–14 victory over Monmouthshire in the non-County Championship match during the 1926–27 season at Taff Vale Park, Pontypridd on Saturday 30 April 1927, the Pontypridd RLFC players for Glamorgan were; Hellings (hooker, 1-try), Grant left-(second-row) and T. Davies (loose forward), and the Pontypridd RLFC players for Monmouthshire were; S. Fairfax (stand-off), Albert Green (left-prop) and George Oliver right-(prop).

=== Demise ===
The team, however, was not successful and by the time it withdrew from professional rugby on 25 October 1927, it had won just eight matches out of the 40 played and conceded nearly 600 points compared to only 271 scored. There was also uncertainty about the club's ground: in August 1927 the owners of Taff Vale Park announced that it had leased the ground for greyhound racing and served notice on the club to find a new ground by 1 January. It was debt, however, that led to the club's demise, with £1,400 owed in the end. Much of this was owed to the RFL, which had lent the club money to purchase players

== See also ==
- Rugby league in Wales
