= Andrew Little (rugby) =

Scotland international rugby union & league footballer

Personal information
- Full name: Andrew Walter Little
- Born: 8 December 1880; Hawick, Roxburghshire, Scotland
- Died: 1 May 1960 (aged 79); Hawick, Roxburghshire, Scotland

Playing information
- Height: 5 ft 11 in (180 cm)
- Weight: 186 lb (84 kg)

Rugby union
Club
| Years | Team | Pld | T | G | FG | P |
|---|---|---|---|---|---|---|
| 1903–05 | Hawick RFC | 0 | 0 | 0 | 0 | 0 |
Representative
| Years | Team | Pld | T | G | FG | P |
| 1905 | Scotland | 1 | 1 | 0 | 0 | 3 |

Rugby league
- Position: Prop
Club
| Years | Team | Pld | T | G | FG | P |
|---|---|---|---|---|---|---|
| 1905 | Wigan | 22 | 0 | 0 | 0 | 0 |
- As of 26 May 2021

Andrew Walter Little (8 December 1880 – 1 May 1960) was a Scottish rugby union and professional rugby league footballer.

== Biography ==
Little was born in Hawick, Roxburghshire. He died in May 1960, aged 79.

== Rugby union ==
Little began his career as captain for Hawick Teviot Union. He was capped once for Scotland in 1905. He played for Hawick RFC. He was vice-captain and

== Rugby league ==
Little transferred to Wigan in 1905–6.

=== County Cup Final appearances ===
Little played in Wigan's 0–0 draw with Leigh in the 1905 Lancashire Cup Final during the 1905–06 season at Wheater's Field, Broughton, on Saturday 2 December 1905, but was replaced by Peter Vickers in the 8–0 victory over Leigh in the 1905 Lancashire Cup Final replay during the 1905–06 season at Wheater's Field, Broughton, on Monday 11 December 1905.
