= Rhys Pugsley =

Wales international rugby league footballer

Personal information
- Born: 20 October 1994 (age 31) Newport, Wales

Playing information
- Position: Prop, Second-row
Representative
Years	Team	Pld	T	G	FG	P
2012	Wales	1	0	0	0	0
- Source: As of 7 September 2014

Rhys Pugsley (born 20 October 1994) was a Welsh former professional rugby league footballer.

Born in Newport, Pugsley attended Caerleon Comprehensive School, and started playing rugby league for local amateur club Newport Titans. In 2011, he joined the academy at Wigan. In 2012, he made his international début for Wales against France on his 18th birthday.

In 2014, he received a two-year ban after testing positive for anabolic steroids. In 2016, he failed a second drugs test after testing positive for the anabolic steroid nandrolone, resulting in a further eight-year ban from all sport.
