= David James (rugby, born 1985) =

Wales international rugby league footballer

Personal information
- Full name: David James
- Born: 9 January 1985 (age 41) Blackwood, Wales
- Height: 6 ft 0 in (1.83 m)
- Weight: 14 st 0 lb (89 kg)

Playing information
- Position: fullback, Wing
Club
Years	Team	Pld	T	G	FG	P
2010–13	South Wales Scorpions	46	15	0	0	60
Representative
Years	Team	Pld	T	G	FG	P
2012	Wales	3	2	0	0	8
- As of 19 February 2013

David James (born 1 September 1985) is a Welsh rugby league footballer; he played for the South Wales Scorpions in the Championship One.

James was born in Blackwood, Caerphilly. He also plays for the Wales national rugby league team. His positions are wing and fullback.
