= Craig Moss (rugby league) =

Wales international rugby league footballer

Personal information
- Born: 4 April 1984 (age 41); Pontefract, England

Playing information
- Position: Fullback
Club
| Years | Team | Pld | T | G | FG | P |
|---|---|---|---|---|---|---|
| 2004–07 | Featherstone Rovers |
| 2009 | Hunslet Hawks |
| 2010–13 | Keighley Cougars |
| | Total | 0 | 0 | 0 | 0 | 0 |
Representative
| Years | Team | Pld | T | G | FG | P |
| 2012 | Wales | 3 | 0 | 0 | 0 | 0 |

Craig Moss (born 4 April 1984) is an English former rugby league footballer who played in the 2000s and 2010s. He played at representative level for Wales, and at club level for Knottingley Rockware ARLFC, Featherstone Rovers, the Hunslet Hawks, and the Keighley Cougars, as a fullback.

== Background ==
Craig Moss was born in Pontefract, West Yorkshire, England.

== Playing career ==
Craig Moss made his début for Featherstone Rovers on Sunday 28 March 2004, and he played his last match for Featherstone Rovers during the 2007–season, as in March 2007, he received a two-year ban after testing positive for the performance-enhancing substance 17-epimethandienone. He returned to the sport in 2009, signing for Hunslet. He then joined Keighley a year later.
