= Reg Jones (rugby) =

Wales international rugby league & union footballer

Personal information
- Full name: Reginald Jones
- Born: Wales

Playing information

Rugby union
Club
Years	Team	Pld	T	G	FG	P
≤1945–45	Maesteg RFC

Rugby league
- Position: Stand-off
Club
Years	Team	Pld	T	G	FG	P
1945–48	Salford
1948–≥48	Rochdale Hornets
	Total	0	0	0	0	0
Representative
Years	Team	Pld	T	G	FG	P
1946	Wales	1

Reginald "Reg" Jones (birth year unknown) is a Welsh former rugby union and professional rugby league footballer who played in the 1940s. He played club level rugby union (RU) for Maesteg RFC, and representative level rugby league (RL) for Wales, and at club level for Salford and Rochdale Hornets, as a stand-off.

== International honours ==
Jones won a cap for Wales (RL) while at Salford in 1946, and he also took part in a tour trial at Headingley, Leeds for the 1946 Great Britain Lions tour of Australia, and New Zealand.
