= Taff Vale Park =

- Location: Nile Street, Treforest, Pontypridd, Rhondda Cynon Taf, Wales
- Coordinates: 51°35′51″N 3°19′40″W
- Opened: 1890

Taff Vale Park is a football ground and former rugby ground and greyhound racing track in Treforest, Pontypridd, Rhondda Cynon Taf, Wales.

Taff Vale Park is situated on the River Taff at the end of Nile Street in Treforest. It was originally fields adjacent to the Taff Vale Iron Works and was used by Pontypridd RFC who developed the site into a rugby ground playing there from the 1890–91 season until 1901 and again in 1907–08.

It was then used by schools between 1900 and 1927 after being purchased by the Pontypridd Urban District Council Education Committee. Greyhound racing began in 1927 after the ground was sub-let to a greyhound company by the Athletic Club. It cost over £25,000 to convert the ground into a track, build kennels and improve the grandstand. Speedway followed in 1929 but the great depression ended the greyhound racing around 1932.

During 1926–27 the ground was home to rugby league team Pontypridd RLFC until the club folded part way through the 1927–28 season.

The site still remains in use as the home of Pontypridd A.F.C..
