= Central Park (Wigan) =

Rugby league stadium in Wigan, England

- Home of Rugby League
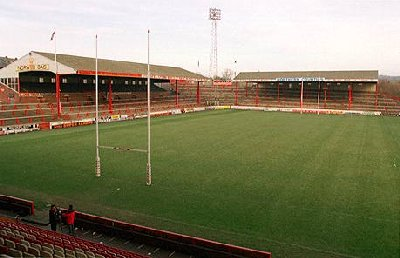
- Interactive map of Central Park
- Full name: Central Park
- Location: Wigan, England
- Coordinates: 53°33′1.5″N 2°37′33″W
- Capacity: 18,000
- Surface: Grass
- Record attendance: 47,747 vs St Helens 27 March 1959

Construction
- Built: 1902
- Opened: 1902
- Closed: 1999
- Demolished: 1999

Tenant
- Wigan RLFC (1902–1999)

Central Park was a rugby league stadium in Wigan, England, which was the home of Wigan RLFC before the club moved to the JJB Stadium in 1999. Its final capacity was 18,000. The site is now a Tesco supermarket and car park.

== History ==
On 6 September 1902, Wigan played at Central Park for the first time in the opening match of the newly formed First Division. An estimated crowd of 9,000 spectators saw Wigan beat Batley 14–8.

The first rugby league international was played between England and Other Nationalities at Central Park on 5 April 1904, Other Nationalities won 9–3 in the experimental Loose forward-less 12-a-side game, with Wigan players David "Dai" Harris, and Eli Davies in the Other Nationalities team.

The visit of St. Helens on 27 March 1959 produced Central Park's record attendance of 47,747, and set a record for a rugby league regular season league game in Britain. Wigan won the game 19–14, holding off a Saints comeback after having led 14–0.

Floodlights were installed on 120 ft high pylons in summer 1967 so that the club could play in the BBC2 Floodlit Trophy.

On 7 October 1987, Central Park was the first English venue used for the World Club Challenge (WCC) between the English champions and the Winfield Cup premiers from Australia. The 1987 World Club Challenge between Wigan and Manly-Warringah saw the home side run out 8–2 winners in a try-less game in front of 36,895, though many who were there believe the attendance was closer to 50,000 (speculation) on the night, far exceeding the 36,000 capacity of the ground at the time. The game was marred by several all-in brawls, while Manly captain Paul Vautin was almost pushed over the fence and into the crowd by a group of Wigan players who had tackled him into touch, the incident sparking another all-in. Second-rower Ron Gibbs became the first player to be sent off in a WCC after hitting Wigan centre Joe Lydon with an elbow to the head after Lydon attempted a field goal, while later in the game Manly fullback Dale Shearer appeared to step on Lydon's head while getting up from a tackle.

Nevertheless, the success of the match and its high attendance saw the World Club Challenge made into an annual event between the English and Australian champions starting in 1989.

A week after the 1992 Rugby League World Cup final (WCF) at Wembley Stadium which saw Australia defeat Great Britain 10–6, Central Park hosted the 1992 World Club Challenge between Wigan and the Brisbane Broncos. With twelve players who played in the WCF playing the challenge (5 from Wigan, 7 from Brisbane), the Broncos became the first Australian side to win the challenge in England with a 22–8 victory in front of 17,764 fans. Wigan would get their revenge just two years later when they defeated the Broncos 20–14 in the 1994 World Club Challenge played in front of a WCC record attendance of 54,220 at the ANZ Stadium in Brisbane. Several thousand fans travelled to Brisbane to support the team, and the win saw Wigan become the first English team to win the Challenge on Australian soil.

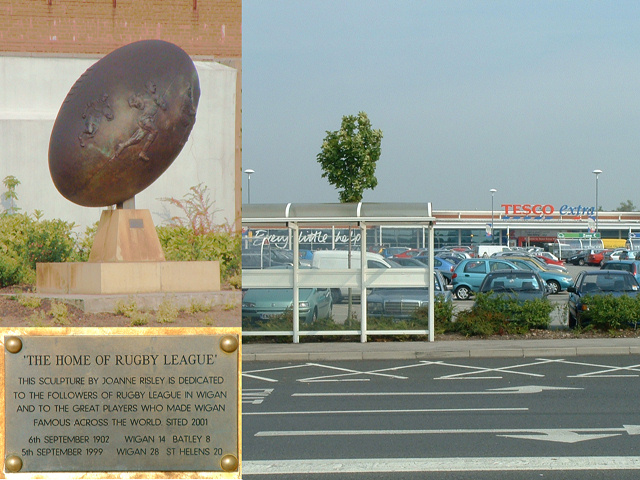
Statue commemorating Central park, which is now the site of a Tesco

In January 1997 the club's shareholders approved a deal in which the stadium would be sold to Wigan Athletic's owner Dave Whelan and be redeveloped to provide a new home for both the football and rugby teams. Two months later however, the Warriors' chairman Jack Robinson accepted a rival bid from Tesco, pointing out that the supermarket's offer was three times bigger than Whelan's.

The final game at Central Park was on Sunday 5 September 1999. Wigan beat St Helens by 28 points to 20, 96 years and 364 days after the first game against Batley was played. The Central Park site later became a Tesco supermarket and car park.

== Rugby League Test Matches ==
List of rugby league test matches played at Central Park.

Test#	Date	Result	Attendance	Notes
1	5 April 1904	Other Nationalities def. England 9–3	6,000	
2	1 January 1906	England drew with Other Nationalities 3–3	8,000	
3	7 February 1923	Wales def. England 13–2	12,000	
4	30 September 1925	England def. Wales 18–14	12,000	
5	2 October 1926	(United Kingdom) England def. New Zealand 28–20	14,500	1926–27 England vs New Zealand series
6	11 January 1928	England def. Wales 20–12	12,000	
7	27 February 1943	England def. Wales 15–9	17,000	
8	26 February 1944	England drew with Wales 9–9	16,028	
9	10 March 1945	England def. Wales 23–8	23,500	
10	20 September 1947	Wales def. England 10–8	27,000	1947–48 European Rugby League Championship
11	22 September 1948	England def. Wales 11–5	12,638	1948–49 European Rugby League Championship
12	1 March 1950	England def. Wales 11–6	27,500	1949–50 European Rugby League Championship
13	11 April 1951	Other Nationalities def. England 25–10	17,000	1950–51 European Rugby League Championship
14	23 April 1952	England def. Other Nationalities 31–18	20,000	1951–52 European Rugby League Championship
15	17 September 1952	England def. Wales 19–8	13,503	1952–53 European Rugby League Championship
16	28 November 1953	England def. Other Nationalities 30–22	19,000	1953–54 European Rugby League Championship
17	12 September 1955	England def. Other Nationalities 33–16	18,234	1955–56 European Rugby League Championship
18	17 November 1956	Great Britain def. Australia 21–10	22,473	1956 Kangaroo tour
19	23 November 1957	England def. France 44–15	19,152	
20	12 December 1959	Great Britain def. Australia 18–12	26,089	1959 Kangaroo tour
21	24 September 1960	Australia def. France 13–12	20,278	1960 Rugby League World Cup
22	8 October 1960	New Zealand def. France 9–0	2,876	1960 Rugby League World Cup
23	17 February 1962	France def. Great Britain 20–15	17,277	
24	3 April 1963	Great Britain def. France 42–4	19,487	
25	6 November 1965	Great Britain drew with New Zealand 9–9	7,919	1965 Great Britain vs New Zealand series
26	5 March 1966	France def. Great Britain 8–4	14,004	
27	4 March 1967	France def. Great Britain 23–13	7,448	
28	25 October 1969	England drew with France 11–11	4,568	1969–70 European Rugby League Championship
29	21 October 1970	Australia def. New Zealand 47–11	9,805	1970 Rugby League World Cup
30	17 February 1974	Great Britain def. France 29–0	9,108	
31	1 November 1975	England def. Australia 16–13	9,393	1975 Rugby League World Cup
32	21 October 1978	Australia def. Great Britain 15–9	17,644	1978 Kangaroo tour
33	18 October 1980	Great Britain drew with New Zealand 14–14	7,031	1980 Great Britain vs New Zealand series
34	20 November 1982	Australia def. Great Britain 27–6	23,126	1982 Kangaroo tour
35	2 November 1985	Great Britain def. New Zealand 25–8	15,506	1985 Great Britain vs New Zealand series
36	1 March 1986	Great Britain def. France 24–10	8,112	
37	22 November 1986	Australia def. Great Britain 24–15	20,169	1986 Kangaroo tour 1985–1988 Rugby League World Cup
38	24 October 1987	Great Britain def. Papua New Guinea 42–0	9,121	1985–1988 Rugby League World Cup
39	21 January 1989	Great Britain def. France 26–10	8,266	
40	11 November 1989	Great Britain def. New Zealand 10–6	20,346	1989 Great Britain vs New Zealand series 1989–1992 Rugby League World Cup
41	9 November 1991	Great Britain def. Papua New Guinea 56–4	4,193	1989–1992 Rugby League World Cup
42	30 October 1993	Great Britain def. New Zealand 29–12	16,502	1993 Great Britain vs New Zealand series
43	11 October 1995	England def. Fiji 46–0	26,263	1995 Rugby League World Cup (Group A)

== Rugby League Tour Matches ==
Other than Wigan club games and test matches, Central Park was also a regular host to various international touring teams from 1907 to 1994.

game	Date	Result	Attendance	Notes
1	9 November 1907	Wigan def. New Zealand 12–8	30,000	1907–08 All Golds tour
2	11 January 1908	England XIII def. New Zealand 18–16	12,000	1907–08 All Golds tour
3	25 November 1908	Australia def. Lancashire 20–6	4,000	1908–09 Kangaroo tour
4	9 January 1909	Wigan def. Australia 10–7	4,000	1908–09 Kangaroo tour
5	20 January 1909	Wigan def. Australia 16–8	9,100	1908–09 Kangaroo tour
6	28 October 1911	Wigan def. Australasia 7–2	25,000	1911–12 Kangaroo tour
7	31 January 1912	Australasia def. Northern Union XIII 20–12	2,000	1911–12 Kangaroo tour
8	15 October 1921	Australasia def. Wigan 14–6	24,308	1921–22 Kangaroo tour
9	3 December 1929	Northern Union XIII def. Australia 18–5	9,987	1929–30 Kangaroo tour
10	28 December 1929	Australia def. Wigan 10–9	8,000	1929–30 Kangaroo tour
11	23 September 1933	Australia def. Wigan 10–4	15,712	1933–34 Kangaroo tour
12	6 March 1934	Wigan def. France 30–27	8,000	1934 French rugby league tour
13	3 November 1937	Australia def. Wigan 25–23	9,800	1937–38 Kangaroo tour
14	22 October 1947	New Zealand def. Wigan 8–10	22,000	1947–48 New Zealand Kiwis tour
15	20 October 1948	Wigan def. Australia 16–11	28,554	1948–49 Kangaroo tour
16	8 December 1948	Lancashire def. Australia 13–8	11,788	1948–49 Kangaroo tour
17	26 August 1950	Wigan def. Italy 49–28	14,000	1950 Italian rugby league tour
18	2 November 1951	New Zealand def. Wigan 15–8	13,538	1951–1952 New Zealand Kiwis tour
19	24 September 1952	Australia def. Wigan 23–13	16,223	1952–53 Kangaroo tour
20	24 September 1955	Wigan def. New Zealand 17–15	19,386	1955–56 New Zealand Kiwis tour
21	8 December 1956	Australia def. Wigan 32–4	15,854	1956–57 Kangaroo tour
22	14 November 1959	Wigan def. Australia 16–9	24,466	1959–60 Kangaroo tour
23	7 October 1961	Wigan def. New Zealand 28–6	25,483	1961 New Zealand Kiwis tour
24	25 September 1963	Lancashire def. Australia 13–11	15,068	1963–64 Kangaroo tour
25	18 November 1963	Australia def. Wigan 32–4	11,746	1963–64 Kangaroo tour
26	4 September 1965	New Zealand def. Wigan 17–12	12,853	1965 New Zealand Kiwis tour
27	13 October 1967	Wigan def. Australia 12–6	22,770	1967–68 Kangaroo tour
28	10 October 1971	New Zealand def. Wigan 24–10	11,987	1971 New Zealand Kiwis tour
29	17 November 1972	Wigan drew with Australia 18–18	6,000	1972 Australian Rugby League World Cup tour
30	18 November 1978	Australia def. Wigan 28–2	10,645	1978 Kangaroo tour
31	13 October 1982	Australia def. Wigan 13–9	12,158	1982 Kangaroo tour
32	23 October 1983	Queensland def. Wigan 40–2	9,749	1983 Queensland Maroons tour
33	6 October 1985	Wigan def. New Zealand 14–8	15,506	1985 New Zealand Kiwis tour
34	12 October 1986	Australia def. Wigan 26–18	30,622	1986 Kangaroo tour
35	8 October 1989	Wigan def. New Zealand 24–14	15,083	1989 New Zealand Kiwis tour
36	14 October 1990	Australia def. Wigan 34–6	24,814	1990 Kangaroo tour
37	10 October 1993	New Zealand def. Wigan 25–18	13,669	1993 New Zealand Kiwis tour
38	8 October 1994	Australia def. Wigan 30–20	20,057	1994 Kangaroo tour

== World Club Challenge/Championship ==
Central Park hosted five World Club Challenge games between 1987 and 1997.

Game	Date	Result	Attendance	Year
1	7 October 1987	Wigan def. Manly-Warringah Sea Eagles 8–2	36,895	1987 World Club Challenge
2	30 October 1992	Brisbane Broncos def. Wigan 22–8	17,764	1992 World Club Challenge
3	20 July 1997	Brisbane Broncos def. Wigan Warriors 30–4	12,816	1997 World Club Championship
4	28 July 1997	Wigan Warriors def. Canterbury Bulldogs 31–24	10,280	1997 World Club Championship
5	3 August 1997	Canberra Raiders def. Wigan Warriors 50–10	12,504	1997 World Club Championship

== See also ==
- English rugby league stadia by capacity

Preceded by Springfield Park	Home of Wigan RLFC; 1902 – 1999	Succeeded by DW Stadium
Preceded by (Australia) Sydney Cricket Ground	Host of the World Club Challenge; 1987	Succeeded by (England) Old Trafford
Preceded by (England) Anfield	Host of the World Club Challenge; 1992	Succeeded by (Australia) ANZ Stadium
