= 1910 Great Britain Lions tour =

- Manager: J. Clifford and J. H. Houghton
- Tour captain(s): James Lomas
- Top point scorer(s): James Lomas (136)
- Top try scorer(s): Bert Jenkins (14)
Summary
P	W	D	L
Total
18	14	1	3
Test match
3	3	0	0
Opponent
P	W	D	L
Australia
2	2	0	0
New Zealand
1	1	0	0

Tour chronology
- Next tour: 1914

The 1910 Great Britain Lions tour of Australia and New Zealand was the first international tour of the Great Britain national rugby league team, "The Lions". They played the second ever Ashes series against Australia, and their first as the visiting team, before travelling to Auckland to take on New Zealand. The tour was a huge promotional and financial success for what was then known as the "Northern Union" game and helped set the pattern for regular, alternating test match series between Britain and Australia. It is regarded as one of the most important events in the history of rugby league.

Despite the selection of several Welsh players in the touring squad, the team is sometimes referred to as "England". They went south from Manchester in early April to London, then travelled by ship for six weeks before reaching Australia. Led by Salford captain James Lomas, the tour was a huge success for the Lions who won all their test matches with Lomas topping the tour scoring charts with 136 points in 13 games.

== Touring squad ==
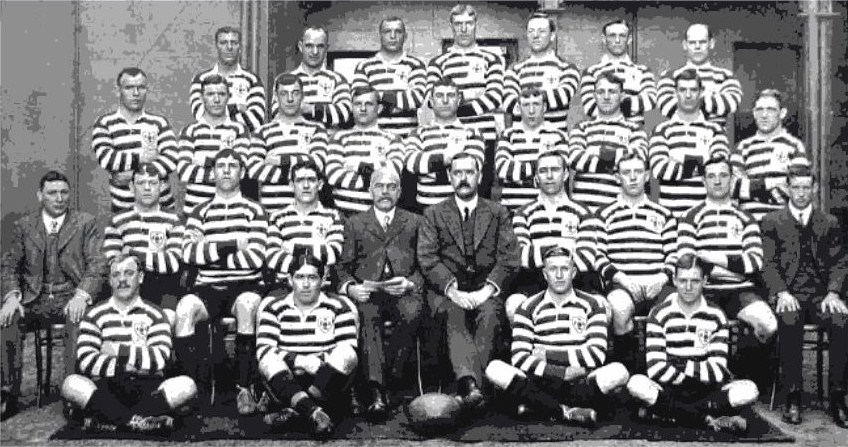
The British touring squad, who wore red and white hooped jerseys.

The team originally scheduled to tour consisted of eighteen internationals: nine English, eight Welsh and one Scottish. All players were from clubs that participated in the 1909–10 Northern Rugby Football Union season's Championship. The players were also accompanied by joint managers, J. H. Houghton and J. Clifford as well as trainer D. Murray.

Several Australians (including Jim Devereux, Dan Frawley and Andy Morton) also appeared for the tourists as guest players in a match against Newcastle on 18 June 1910.

Name	Club	Position	Appearances	Tests	Tries	Goals	Points
Albert Avery	Oldham	Forward	11	2	7	0	21
Jack Bartholomew	Huddersfield	Three-quarter back	5	0	3	1	11
Billy Batten	Hunslet	Three-quarter back	12	3	5	1	17
Frank Boylen	Hull	Forward	7	0	1	5	13
Ephraim Curzon	Salford	Forward	6	1	3	0	9
James Davies	Huddersfield	Half-back	5	0	1	0	3
Fred Farrar	Hunslet	Three-quarter back	4	0	4	1	14
Tom Helm (Note: Helm was injured on the journey to Australia and did not play in any games on the tour.)	Oldham	Forward	0	0	0	0	0
Bert Jenkins	Wigan	Three-quarter back	11	2	14	0	42
Chick Jenkins	Ebbw Vale	Three-quarter back	10	0	3	4	17
Bill Jukes	Hunslet	Forward	12	3	10	0	30
Herbert Kershaw	Wakefield Trinity	Forward	10	2	5	0	15
Jim Leytham	Wigan	Three-quarter back	12	3	12	5	46
James Lomas (c)	Salford	Three-quarter back	13	3	10	53	136
Tommy Newbould	Wakefield Trinity	Half-back	7	1	2	0	6
Dick Ramsdale	Wigan	Forward	7	2	2	0	6
Joe Riley	Halifax	Three-quarter back	9	1	11	0	33
George Ruddick	Broughton Rangers	Forward	9	1	2	0	6
Jim Sharrock	Wigan	Full-back	9	3	0	3	6
Frank Shugars	Warrington	Forward	12	1	1	0	3
Fred Smith	Hunslet	Half-back	12	2	4	0	12
Johnny Thomas	Wigan	Half-back	12	3	7	12	45
Billy Ward	Leeds	Forward	4	1	1	0	3
Fred Webster	Leeds	Forward	14	3	3	0	9
Billy Winstanley	Leigh	Forward	14	2	5	0	15
Frank Young	Leeds	Full-back	2	0	0	0	0

== Australian leg ==
The Australian leg of the tour took place during the 1910 NSWRFL season, the third season of rugby league football in Australia since the game's split from rugby union.

=== Test Venues ===
The two Ashes series tests took place at the following venues.

Sydney	Brisbane
Royal Agricultural Showground	Brisbane Exhibition Ground
Capacity: 50,000	Capacity: 35,000

=== Versus New South Wales ===
Before the test series, the British played three matches against New South Wales, losing the first 14 – 28 and the second 20 – 27.

10,000 people saw the match on 29 May whose margin never went beyond more than five points.

11 June

New South Wales	10 – 23	Northern Union
Tries: Jack Hickey, Dally Messenger; Goals: Dally Messenger (2)		Tries: James Lomas (2), Frank Shugars; Goals: James Lomas (4); Jim Leytham (1)

Royal Agricultural Society Ground, Sydney
Attendance: 27,000

This was the third match and first win of the visitors' series against New South Wales, with their captain, Jim Lomas featuring prominently.

=== Ashes series ===
Sydney's Royal Agricultural Showground was the venue for the first Ashes test on Australian soil. Five former Wallaby teammates made their rugby league test debuts for Australia in this match: Charles Russell, John Barnett, Bob Craig, Jack Hickey, and Chris McKivat.

18 June

Australia	20 – 27	(United Kingdom) Northern Union
Tries: John Barnett; Jack Hickey; Dally Messenger; Charlie Woodhead; Goals: Dally Messenger (4)		Tries: Bill Jukes, (3); Jim Leytham (2); Billy Batten; Johnny Thomas; Goals: Jim Leytham (1); James Lomas (1); Johnny Thomas (1)

Royal Agricultural Showground, Sydney
Attendance: 42,000
Referee: Tom McMahon Sr.

Australia	Posit.	Northern Union
Charles Russell	FB	Jim Sharrock
Charles Woodhead	WG	Jim Leytham
Jack Hickey	CE	Jim Lomas (c)
Dally Messenger (c)	CE	Bert Jenkins
Albert Broomham	WG	Billy Batten
Bill Farnsworth	FE/SO	Johnny Thomas
Chris McKivat	HB/SH	Tommy Newbould
Bill Noble	PR	Billy Ward
John Barnett	HK	Fred Webster
Bill Spence	PR	Bill Jukes
Ed Courtney	SR	Dick Ramsdale
Con Sullivan	SR	Ephraim Curzon
Robert Craig	LF	Albert Avery

This day also featured a goal-kicking contest between the two sides' captains, Dally Messenger and Jim Lomas, won 3-2 by Lomas

2 July

Australia	17 – 22	(United Kingdom) Northern Union
Tries: John Barnett; Dally Messenger; Chris McKivat; Robert Craig; Bob Tubman; Goals: Jack Hickey		Tries: Jim Leytham (4); Johnny Thomas; Herbert Kershaw Goals: James Lomas (2); Johnny Thomas (2)

Exhibition Ground, Brisbane
Attendance: 18,000
Referee: Jack Fihelly

Australia	Posit.	Northern Union
Doug McGregor	FB	Jim Sharrock
Charles Woodhead	WG	Billy Batten
Jack Hickey	CE	Jim Lomas (c)
Herbert Messenger	CE	Joe Riley
Bill Heidke (c)	WG	Jim Leytham
Bill Farnsworth	FE/SO	Fred Smith
Chris McKivat	HB/SH	Tommy Newbould
Herb Brackenrigg	PR	George Ruddick
Robert Craig	HK	Herbert Kershaw
Edward Buckley	PR	Fred Webster
Bob Tubman	SR	Bill Jukes
John Barnett	SR	Billy Winstanley
Harold Nicholson	LF	Dick Ramsdale

This match also featured a goal-kicking contest, between Dally Messenger, Jim Lomas and Herb Brackenrigg, which the latter won. Queensland's Bill Heidke was awarded the captaincy for this match, the first non-New South Welshman to achieve this honour. In the second test, Australia had gotten off to an early lead over the visitors at 11 nil. Jim Leytham's four tries in this match would remain an unbeaten Ashes record.

The British had thus won the series in two tests.

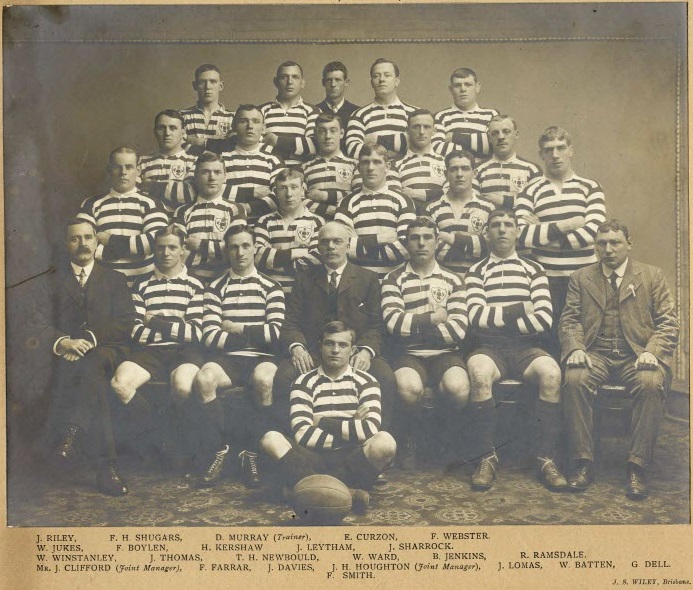
The British team in Brisbane.

=== Versus Australasia ===
It was decided that after the Ashes series, a combined "Australasia" team, comprising the best players of Australia and New Zealand would play a series of matches against the touring Britons. The Australian jersey's sky blue with maroon hoops had black hoops added to it for these matches.

9 July

Australasia	13 – 13	Northern Union
Tries: V Farnsworth, E Courtney, C McKivatt; Goals: H Messenger (2)		Tries: J Leytham, A Avery, B Winstanley; Goals: J Lomas, J Thomas

Royal Agricultural Society Showground, Sydney
Attendance: 45,000
Referee: Tom McMahon Sr.

The British team were conveyed on to the ground by a group of "Jack tars" in port at Sydney who took the place of the horses that were to pull the drag coach.

The first points came from an individual effort from Viv Farnsworth that led to him scoring in the corner. Great Britain replied with a penalty goal through Jim Lomas. Courtney got the next try, which Brackenrigg failed to convert. Then it was the visitors' turn to score, with a try to Leytham out wide. Lomas missed the kick, so Australasia were leading 8 – 5 at the half time break. They extended their lead to 13 – 5 before The British made a strong comeback to level the scores with a late try before full-time.

13 July

Australasia	32 – 15	Northern Union
Tries: V Farnsworth, H Messenger, H Brackenrigg, B Spence; Goals: H Messenger (5), H Brackenrigg (3), C McKivat (2)		Tries: Riley (2), B Winstanley; Goals: J Thomas (3)

Wentworth Park, Sydney
Attendance: 15,000

At one stage Great Britain were leading 15 – 5 but at half time were trailing 15 – 17. They scored no more points in the second half, as Australasia overran them.

In the evening following the match, the touring Britons left for New Zealand on the Maheno. The next time the two sides would meet was during the 1911–12 Kangaroo tour of Great Britain.

== New Zealand leg ==
The British team arrived in Auckland on 17 July and were met by officials of the newly formed New Zealand Rugby League before being given a mayoral reception the following morning. During the tour the Lions donated the Northern Union Cup which was awarded to Auckland for inter-provincial competition and is still contested today.

20 July

New Zealand Māori	0 – 29	Northern Union
		Tries: B Jenkins (4), J Lomas, F Smith; Goals: J Lomas (4)

Victoria Park, Auckland
Attendance: 6,000
Referee: Mr Sharrock

The first match was played in weather described as atrocious against a New Zealand Māori team captained by Whiri Winiata and featuring Albert Asher who had played with the victorious Australasia team back in Australia. The first international try scored on New Zealand soil was by Halifax winger, Joe Riley and this was followed by a hat-trick of tries by Wigan centre Bert Jenkins. Great Britain led 23 – 0 at half-time. In the second half, Fred Smith scored a fourth try for the visitors.

23 July

Auckland	9 – 52	Northern Union
Tries: Seagar, A Asher, Griffin; Goals: Jackson 0/2		Tries: Jenkins, Jukes (2), Avery, Riley (3), Leytham (2), Kershaw, Lomas, Winstanley; Goals: Lomas 8/11, Leytham 1/1

Victoria Park, Auckland
Attendance: 10,000
Referee: Jack Stanaway

The Auckland side was; Alf Chorley, L Nolan, G Smith, Albert Asher, Alf Jackson, Ronald MacDonald, Len Farrant, Fred Jackson (c), Charles Dunning, Jim Griffin, Alex Stanaway, H Fricker, George Seagar. Emergencies; Syd Riley, Arthur Carlaw, J Bennett, Jim Rukutai, Bob Mitchell.

26 July

Rotorua	18 – 54	Northern Union
Nirai McRae

Rotorua

=== Versus New Zealand ===
New Zealand wore the colours of Red and Yellow with Black bands for the Test match. It was the only time that they wore these colours.

30 July

New Zealand	20 – 52	(United Kingdom) Northern Union
Tries: Ernie Buckland; Ned Hughes; Ronald MacDonald; George Seagar Goals: Fred Jackson (4)		Tries: Albert Avery (3); Bert Jenkins (2); Herbert Kershaw (2); Jim Leytham (2); Jim Lomas; Fred Smith; Johnny Thomas; Goals: Jim Lomas (6); Johnny Thomas (1); Field Goals: Jim Sharrock (1)

Domain Cricket Ground, Auckland
Attendance: 16,000
Referee: Jack Stanaway

New Zealand	Posit.	Northern Union
Alf Chorley	FB	Jim Sharrock
Ernie Buckland	WG	Jim Leytham
Albert Asher	CE	Jim Lomas (c)
Ernie Asher	CE	Bert Jenkins
Charles James	WG	Billy Batten
Frank Woodward	SO	Johnny Thomas
Ronald MacDonald	SH	Fred Smith
Charles Dunning (c)	PR	Fred Webster
Pat Hannigan	HK	Billy Winstanley
Ned Hughes	PR	Herbert Kershaw
Fred Jackson	SR	Bill Jukes
George Seagar	SR	Frank Shugars
Jim Griffen	LF	Albert Avery

The touring British side had been invited to play another match in Australia, so left Auckland for Sydney on 1 August on the SS Maheno after a hearty send-off.

== Return leg ==
On their way back to England, a portion of the touring Britons stopped in Sydney for one more game against a New South Wales second XIII, as there was already a New South Wales team playing against Queensland in Brisbane.

6 August

New South Wales 2nd XIII	12 – 50	Northern Union

Sydney
Attendance: 20,000
