= 1911–12 Kangaroo tour of Great Britain =

Rugby league tour (1911–1912)

- The Kangaroo squad of 1911–12
- Date: 23 September 1911 – 3 February 1912
- Manager: Charles H. Ford and John Quinlan
- Tour captain(s): Chris McKivat
Summary
P	W	D	L
Total
36	29	2	5
Test match
3	2	1	0
Opponent
P	W	D	L
Great Britain
3	2	1	0

Tour chronology
- Previous tour: 1908–09
- Next tour: 1921–22

The 1911–12 Kangaroo tour of Great Britain was the second ever Kangaroo tour and was actually a tour by an "Australasian" squad that included four New Zealand players in addition to 24 Australian representatives. It took place over the British winter of 1911–12 and this time, to help promote the game of Rugby league in New Zealand, the Northern Rugby Football Union invited a combined Australian and New Zealand team. They became the first tourists to win the Ashes. and the last to do so on British soil for over half a century. The tour was a success in performance and organisation. Matches were well attended, the squad's touring payments were maintained throughout and the players all shared in a bonus at the tour's end.

== Touring squad ==
Prior to the tour a three-way series of matches between New South Wales, Queensland and New Zealand was organised as a basis of selection for the tour. The New South Welshmen dominated the touring side, with four New Zealanders and only one Queenslander selected. However counted amongst the New South Welshmen was Con Sullivan, who had moved to Australia from New Zealand a few years before. Due to family and business commitments, rugby league great Dally Messenger declined to tour with the 1911–12 Kangaroos. His friend and teammate Sandy Pearce also chose not to go. Chris McKivat who had captained the 1908 Wallabies to Olympic Gold was at age 32 a natural selection as tour captain. The Heads/Middleton reference describes McKivat as being revered on that tour – a magnificent general, tough, durable and an inspiration to the men around him. It quotes Johnny Quinlan the tour co-manager "He always set a splendid example in conduct and training – a natural leader" Tour vice-captain was Paddy McCue. Tour managers were Charles H Ford and John Quinlan. The team sailed to England on the RMS Orvieto. The tourists were paid £4/5/ per week and received a bonus of £178 each.

=== New South Wales ===
All eight teams of the New South Wales Rugby Football League premiership were represented in the touring squad.

- Bob Stuart, forward for Annandale
- Bob Craig, forward for Balmain
- Charles "Chook" Fraser, fullback for Balmain
- Arthur "Pony" Halloway, half for Balmain
- Charles McMurtrie, forward for Balmain
- Dan Frawley, three-quarter for Eastern Suburbs
- Bob Williams, forward for Eastern Suburbs
- Peter Burge, forward for Glebe
- (c) Chris McKivat, half for Glebe
- Billy Farnsworth, half for Newtown
- Viv Farnsworth, three-quarter for Newtown
- Paddy McCue, forward for Newtown
- Joe Murray, forward for Newtown
- Webby Neill, fullback for Newtown
- Bill Noble, forward for Newtown
- Charlie Russell, three-quarter for Newtown
- Tom Berecry, North Sydney
- Albert Broomham, North Sydney
- Con Sullivan, forward for North Sydney
- W. A. Cann, forward for South Sydney
- Steve Darmody, South Sydney
- Herb Gilbert, three-quarter for South Sydney
- Howard Hallett, fullback for South Sydney
- Tedda Courtney, forward for Western Suburbs

=== New Zealand ===
The New Zealand players that accompanied the Australians on tour have been listed in the Australian Rugby League's Kangaroos players register.

- George A. Gillett (forward)
- Arthur Francis (forward)
- Charlie Savory (forward)
- Frank Woodward (half)

=== Queensland ===
Robert "Harold" Nicholson of Queensland was also selected for the tour but withdrew.

== Tour schedule ==
Played: 35 Won: 28 Drew: 2 Lost: 5 Ashes: Australia 2–0

	Date	Opponent	Location	Result	Score	Attendance
Match 1	23 September 1911	Midlands/Southern England	The Butts Ground, Coventry	Won	20–11	3,000
Match 2	25 September 1911	Yorkshire	Bramall Lane, Sheffield	Won	33–13	4,000
Match 3	30 September 1911	Broughton Rangers	Wheater's Field, Broughton, Salford	Won	18–8	12,000
Match 4	2 October 1911	Lancashire	Ewood Park, Blackburn	Won	25–12	5,000
Match 5	7 October 1911	Wales	Bridgend Field, Ebbw Vale, Wales	Won	28–20	7,000
Match 6	11 October 1911	Widnes	Lowerhouse Lane, Widnes	Won	23–0	5,000
Match 7	14 October 1911	St. Helens	Knowsley Road, St. Helens	Won	16–5	12,000
Match 8	18 October 1911	England XIII	Craven Cottage, London	Won	11–6	6,000
Match 9	22 October 1911	Hunslet	Parkside, Hunslet	Draw	3–3	4,000
Match 10	25 October 1911	Northern League XIII	Goodison Park, Liverpool	Won	16–3	6,000
Match 11	28 October 1911	Wigan	Central Park, Wigan	Lost	2–7	25,000
Match 12	1 November 1911	Swinton	Chorley Road, Swinton	Won	28–9	4,000
Match 13	4 November 1911	Hull F.C.	The Boulevard, Hull	Won	26–7	6,000
Match 14	8 November 1911	Great Britain	St James' Park, Newcastle	Won	19–10	5,317
Match 15	11 November 1911	Oldham	Watersheddings, Oldham	Lost	8–14	10,000
Match 16	15 November 1911	Leigh	Mather Lane, Leigh	Won	13–12	6,000
Match 17	18 November 1911	Wakefield Trinity	Belle Vue, Wakefield	Won	24–10	5,000
Match 18	22 November 1911	Cumberland	Athletic Ground, Maryport	Won	5–2	6,000
Match 19	25 November 1911	Barrow	Cavendish Park, Barrow	Won	44–8	6,500
Match 20	29 November 1911	Runcorn	Canal Street, Runcorn	Won	23–7	2,000
Match 21	2 December 1911	Huddersfield	Fartown, Huddersfield	Lost	7–21	17,000
Match 22	6 December 1911	England XIII	Trent Bridge, Nottingham	Lost	3–5	3,000
Match 23	9 December 1911	Salford	The Willows, Salford	Won	6–3	4,000
Match 24	13 December 1911	York	Clarence Street, York	Won	16–8	1,500
Match 25	16 December 1911	Great Britain	Tynecastle Stadium, Edinburgh, Scotland	Draw	11–11	8,000
Match 26	20 December 1911	/ Wales/West England	Ashton Gate, Bristol	Won	23–3	1,000
Match 27	23 December 1911	Rochdale Hornets	Athletic Grounds, Rochdale	Won	18–6	4,500
Match 28	26 December 1911	Halifax	Thrum Hall, Halifax	Won	23–5	10,000
Match 29	30 December 1911	Warrington	Wilderspool, Warrington	Won	34–6	8,500
Match 30	1 January 1912	Great Britain	Villa Park, Birmingham	Won	33–8	4,000
Match 31	6 January 1912	Leeds	Headingley, Leeds	Won	8–6	1,000
Match 32	13 January 1912	Hull Kingston Rovers	Craven Street, Hull	Won	5–2	7,000
Match 33	20 January 1912	Barrow	Cavendish Park, Barrow	Won	22–5	1,500
Match 34	27 January 1912	Batley	Mount Pleasant, Batley	Lost	5–13	2,000
Match 35	31 January 1912	Northern League XIII	Central Park, Wigan	Won	20–12	2,000
Match 36	3 February 1912	Runcorn	Canal Street, Runcorn	Won	54–6	1,500

== Test matches ==
=== First Ashes Test ===
Test No. 12

8 November 1911

Great Britain	10–19	(Australia) Australasia
Tries: Will Davies (2) Goals: Johnny Thomas (2)		Tries: Viv Farnsworth (2); Howard Hallett; Billy Cann; Arthur Francis; Goals: Billy Cann (1); Arthur Francis (1)

St James' Park, Newcastle
Attendance: 5,317
Referee: B. Ennion

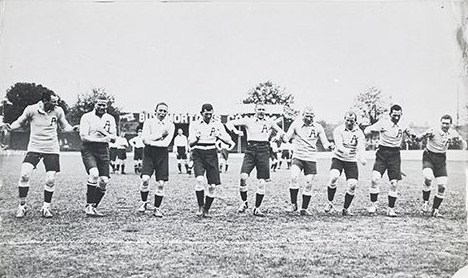
The Kangaroos performing their war cry before the first Test.

Great Britain	Position	Australasia
Jim Sharrock	FB	Charles Fraser
Will Davies	WG	Albert Broomham
Bert Jenkins	CE	Howard Hallett
Harold Wagstaff	CE	Herb Gilbert
Joe Miller	WG	Charles Russell
Johnny Thomas (c)	SO	Viv Farnsworth
Fred Smith	SH	Chris McKivat (c)
James Clampitt	PR	Arthur Francis
Oliver Burgham	HK	Paddy McCue
Fred Harrison	PR	Billy Cann
Ben Gronow	SR	Tedda Courtney
Billy Winstanley	SR	Bob Williams
Albert Avery	LF	Bob Craig
	Coach

In this match, Australia's Charles Fraser became Australia's youngest Test player at 18 years and 301 days, a record which would stand until 2007.

=== Second Ashes Test ===
Test No. 13

16 December 1911

Great Britain	11–11	(Australia) Australasia
Tries: Harold Wagstaff (2); Jim Lomas Goals: Alf Wood		Tries: Dan Frawley; Chris McKivat; Charlie Russell; Goals: Arthur Francis (1)

Tynecastle Stadium, Edinburgh
Attendance: 8,000
Referee: H. Renton

Great Britain	Position	Australasia
Alf Wood	FB	Howard Hallett
Albert Jenkinson	WG	Charles Russell
Jim Lomas (c)	CE	Viv Farnsworth
Harold Wagstaff	CE	Herb Gilbert
Billy Batten	WG	Dan Frawley
Jim Davies	SO	Bill Farnsworth
Fred Smith	SH	Chris McKivat (c)
Fred Harrison	PR	Arthur Francis
Tommy Woods	HK	Paddy McCue
Billy Winstanley	PR	Billy Cann
Dick Ramsdale	SR	Bill Noble
Doug Clark	SR	Tedda Courtney
Ben Gronow	LF	Bob Craig
	Coach

McKivat lead the way for Australia dominating the rucks and scoring a vital try. Renowned Australian journalist Claude Corbett was acting as one of the touch judges and referee Renton, over-ruled his goal decision on one of the Australian conversion attempts.

=== Third Ashes Test ===
Test No. 14

1 January 1912

Great Britain	8–33	(Australia) Australasia
Tries: Doug Clark; Jim Lomas Goals: Alf Wood (1)		Tries: Tom Berecry (2); Dan Frawley (2); Paddy McCue (2); Chris McKivat (2); Viv Farnsworth; Goals: Dan Frawley (2); Herb Gilbert (1)

Villa Park, Birmingham
Attendance: 4,000
Referee: R. Robinson

Great Britain	Position	Australasia
Alf Wood	FB	Howard Hallett
Billy Batten	WG	Dan Frawley
Jim Lomas (c)	CE	Viv Farnsworth
Bert Jenkins	CE	Herb Gilbert
Albert Jenkinson	WG	Tom Berecry
Fred Smith	SO	Bill Farnsworth
Jim Davies	SH	Chris McKivat (c)
Dick Ramsdale	PR	Con Sullivan
Billy Winstanley	HK	Paddy McCue
Doug Clark	PR	Billy Cann
Tommy Woods	SR	Bob Williams
Fred Harrison	SR	Bill Noble
Albert Avery	LF	Bob Craig
	Coach

Great Britain only needed to win the third Test to tie the series and keep the Ashes but were reduced to 12 men early in the encounter after an injury to Dick Ramsdale. Great Britain led 8–0 early but had no answer to the Australian attack as they ran in nine tries.

This would be the first (and final) time the Kangaroos would win The Ashes on British soil until the 1963–64 Kangaroo tour.
