= Jim Sharrock =

GB & England international rugby league footballer

Personal information
- Full name: James Sharrock
- Born: 24 October 1882 Aspull, Wigan, England
- Died: 16 February 1945 (aged 62) Aspull, Wigan, England

Playing information
- Height: 5 ft 8 in (173 cm)
- Weight: 14 st 0 lb (89 kg)
- Position: Fullback
Club
Years	Team	Pld	T	G	FG	P
1903–13	Wigan	275	7	141		303
Representative
Years	Team	Pld	T	G	FG	P
1910–11	England	2	0	0	0	0
1910–12	Great Britain	4	0	1	0	2

James Sharrock (24 October 1882 – 16 February 1945) was an English professional rugby league footballer who played in the 1900s and 1910s. He played at representative level for Great Britain and England, and at club level for Wigan, as a fullback. In 1917 he joined the Wigan board of directors, and was later a secretary-manager for Rochdale Hornets.

== Background ==
Sharrock was born in Aspull, Wigan, Lancashire, England, and he died aged 62 in Aspull, Wigan, Lancashire, England.

== Playing career ==
=== Championship final appearances ===
Sharrock played fullback in Wigan's 7–3 victory over Oldham in the Championship Final during the 1908–09 season at The Willows, Salford on Saturday 1 May 1909.

=== County League appearances ===
Sharrock played in Wigan's victories in the Lancashire League during the 1908–09 season, 1910–11 season, 1911–12 season and 1912–13 season.

=== County Cup Final appearances ===
Sharrock played fullback, and scored a goal in Wigan's 10–9 victory over Oldham in the 1908 Lancashire Cup Final during the 1908–09 season at Wheater's Field, Broughton, on Saturday 19 December 1908, played fullback in the 22–5 victory over Leigh in the 1909 Lancashire Cup Final during the 1909–10 season at Wheater's Field, Broughton, on Saturday 27 November 1909, and played fullback, and scored 2-goals in the 21–5 victory over Rochdale Hornets in the 1912 Lancashire Cup Final during the 1912–13 season at Weaste, Salford, on Wednesday 11 December 1912.

=== Notable tour matches ===
Sharrock played fullback in Wigan's 12–8 victory over New Zealand in the 1907–1908 New Zealand rugby tour of Australia and Great Britain match at Central Park, Wigan, on Saturday 9 November 1907, in the 10–7 victory over Australia in the 1908–09 Kangaroo tour of Great Britain match at Central Park, Wigan, on Saturday 9 January 1909, played fullback, and scored a goal in the 16–8 victory over Australia in the 1908–09 Kangaroo tour of Great Britain match at Central Park, Wigan, on Wednesday 20 January 1909, and played fullback in the 7–2 victory over Australia in the 1911–12 Kangaroo tour of Great Britain match at Central Park, Wigan, on Saturday 28 October 1911.

=== International honours ===
Sharrock won caps for England while at Wigan in 1910 against Wales, and in 1911 against Australia, and won caps for Great Britain while at Wigan on the 1910 Great Britain Lions tour of Australia and New Zealand against Australia (2 matches), Australasia (2 matches), and New Zealand, and in 1911–12 against Australia.
