= Fred Gleave =

England international rugby league footballer

Personal information
- Full name: Frederick Gleave

Playing information
- Position: Stand-off
Club
Years	Team	Pld	T	G	FG	P
1903–14	Wigan	193	19	0	0	57
Representative
Years	Team	Pld	T	G	FG	P
1911–13	Lancashire	5	1	0	0	3
1913	England	1	0	0	0	0

Frederick "Fred" Gleave was an English professional rugby league footballer who played in the 1900s and 1910s. He played at representative level for England, and at club level for Wigan, as a stand-off.

== Playing career ==
=== International honours ===
Fred Gleave won a cap for England while at Wigan in 1913 against Wales.

=== County Cup Final appearances ===
Fred Gleave played scrum-half in Wigan's 10-9 victory over Oldham in the 1908 Lancashire Cup Final during the 1908–09 season at Wheater's Field, Broughton, on Saturday 19 December 1908, and played stand-off in the 21–5 victory over Rochdale Hornets in the 1912 Lancashire Cup final during the 1912–13 season at Weaste, Salford, on Wednesday 11 December 1912.
