= Bert Jenkins =

Great Britain and Wales international rugby league footballer

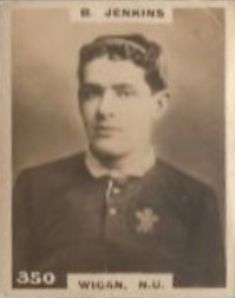
- Godfrey Phillips Cigarette card featuring Jenkins

Personal information
- Full name: Thomas Bertie Jenkins
- Born: first ¼ 1885 Troed-y-rhiw, Merthyr Tydfil district, Wales
- Died: 4 February 1943 (aged 57–58) Merthyr Tydfil district, Wales

Playing information
- Height: 5 ft 8 in (1.73 m)
- Weight: 12 st 10 lb (81 kg)

Rugby union
Club
Years	Team	Pld	T	G	FG	P
c. 1901–04	Troedyrhiw RFC
1904	Mountain Ash RFC
	Total	0	0	0	0	0

Rugby league
- Position: Centre
Club
Years	Team	Pld	T	G	FG	P
1904–20	Wigan	389	182	0	0	546
Representative
Years	Team	Pld	T	G	FG	P
≥1904–≤20	Lancashire	≥1
1908–14	Wales	11	4	0	0	12
1908–14	Great Britain	14	2	0	0	6

Thomas Bertie "Bert" Jenkins (first ¼ 1885 – 4 February 1943) was a Welsh rugby union, and professional rugby league footballer who played in the 1900s, 1910s and 1920s. He played club level rugby union (RU) for Troedyrhiw RFC and Mountain Ash RFC, and representative level rugby league (RL) for Great Britain, Wales and Lancashire, and at club level for Wigan, as a centre.

== Background ==
Bert Jenkins was born in Troed-y-rhiw, Wales (his birth was registered in Merthyr Tydfil district), and his death aged 57 was registered in Merthyr Tydfil district, Wales.

== Playing career ==
=== International honours ===
Bert Jenkins won caps for Wales (RL) while at Wigan in 1908 against New Zealand, and in 1909 against England, and won caps for Great Britain (RL) while at Wigan in 1908 against New Zealand (3 matches), and Australia (3 matches), in 1909 against Australia (2 matches), on the 1910 Great Britain Lions tour of Australia and New Zealand against Australia, Australasia (2 matches), and New Zealand, in 1911 against Australia, in 1912 against Australia, and in 1914 against Australia, and New Zealand.

Jenkins captained the Great Britain team in the first ever test match between The Lions and Australia at the Park Royal Ground in London on 12 December 1908. The match ended in a 22-all draw. Although he also played in the last two tests of the three test series, the Great Britain captaincy was taken over by Salford centre Johnny Thomas.

=== County honours ===
Bert Jenkins won cap(s) for Lancashire (RL) while at Wigan.

=== Championship final appearances ===
Bert Jenkins played at centre in Wigan's 7–3 victory over Oldham in the Championship Final during the 1908–09 season at The Willows, Salford on Saturday 1 May 1909.

=== County League appearances ===
Bert Jenkins played in Wigan's victories in the Lancashire League during the 1908–09 season, 1910–11 season, 1911–12 season, 1912–13 season, 1913–14 season and 1914–15 season.

=== County Cup Final appearances ===
Bert Jenkins played centre in Wigan's 0–0 draw with Leigh in the 1905 Lancashire Cup Final during the 1905–06 season at Wheater's Field, Broughton on Saturday 2 December 1905, played centre, and scored a try, in the 8–0 victory over Leigh in the 1905 Lancashire Cup Final replay during the 1905–06 season at Wheater's Field, Broughton on Monday 11 December 1905, played at centre in the 10–9 victory over Oldham in the 1908 Lancashire Cup Final during the 1908–09 season at Wheater's Field, Broughton on Saturday 19 December 1908, played at centre in the 22–5 victory over Leigh in the 1909 Lancashire Cup Final during the 1909–10 season at Wheater's Field, Broughton on Saturday 27 November 1909, and played at centre in the 21–5 victory over Leigh in the 1912 Lancashire Cup Final during the 1912–13 season at Weaste (The Willows, Salford?) on Wednesday 11 December 1912.

=== Notable tour matches ===
Bert Jenkins played at centre and scored a try in Wigan's 12–8 victory over New Zealand at Central Park, Wigan, on Saturday 9 November 1907, played at centre, and scored a try in the 10–7 victory over Australia at Central Park, Wigan, on Saturday 9 January 1909, played at centre, and scored a try in the 16–8 victory over Australia at Central Park, Wigan, on Wednesday 20 January 1909, and played at centre in the 7–2 victory over Australia at Central Park, Wigan, on Saturday 28 October 1911.

=== Testimonial match ===
A Testimonial match at Wigan was shared by; Bert Jenkins, Dick Ramsdale and Johnny Thomas.

=== Club career ===
Bert Jenkins made his début for Troedyrhiw RFC aged sixteen, he transferred to Mountain Ash at the start of the 1904/05 season, he changed rugby football codes from rugby union to rugby league, and transferred to Wigan during December 1904, he made his début for Wigan in the 10–7 victory over Runcorn RFC at Central Park, Wigan on Saturday 10 December 1904, he scored his first try for Wigan in the 20–2 victory over Oldham at Central Park, Wigan on Saturday 15 April 1905, he scored his last try for Wigan in the 11–3 victory over Rochdale Hornets at Central Park, Wigan on Wednesday 17 March 1920, and he played his last for match for Wigan in the 2–10 defeat by Leeds at Headingley, Leeds on Saturday 11 September 1920.

During Bert Jenkins' time at Wigan, they also won the South West Lancashire League in 1904–05 and 1905–06.

Bert Jenkins is one of less than twenty Welshmen to have scored more than 200-tries in their rugby league career.

== Bibliography ==
- Gate, Robert (1986). Gone North: Volume 1. Ripponden: R.E. Gate. ISBN 0-9511190-0-1.
