= Jim Leytham =

Great Britain and England international rugby league footballer

Personal information
- Full name: James Leytham
- Born: 12 December 1879 Lancaster, England
- Died: 20 August 1916 (aged 36) Morecambe Bay, England

Playing information
- Height: 5 ft 9 in (1.75 m)
- Weight: 12 st 8 lb (80 kg)
- Position: Wing
Club
Years	Team	Pld	T	G	FG	P
1897–03	Lancaster
1903–12	Wigan	280	258	267		1,308
	Total	280	258	267	0
Representative
Years	Team	Pld	T	G	FG	P
	Lancashire
1905–10	England	5	8	7	0	38
1908–10	Great Britain	5	10	1	0	32

James Leytham (12 December 1879 – 20 August 1916), also known by the nickname of "Gentleman Jim", was an English professional rugby league footballer who played in the 1890s, 1900s and 1910s. He played at representative level for Great Britain, England and Lancashire, and at club level for Lancaster and Wigan (captain), as a wing.

== Background ==
Jim Leytham's birth was registered in Lancaster, Lancashire. He lived with his wife and children in Lodge Street, Lancaster. The house was demolished a number of years ago. As of 2019 it is a car park at the rear of the Grand Theatre, Lancaster, opposite Classic Drinks (a delivery wholesale business supplying drinks to pubs and bars, previously part of Booker Group, now part of Tesco). Leytham along with several members of his family died in a fishing accident in the River Lune Estuary, Morecambe Bay, Lancashire on Sunday 20 August 1916. His death at age 36 was registered in Lancaster, Lancashire.

== Playing career ==
=== Club career ===
Leytham made his début for Wigan Warriors, and scored a try in the 14-0 victory over Batley at Central Park, Wigan, on Saturday 12 December 1903. During Jim Leytham's time at Wigan, they also won the South West Lancashire League in 1904–05 and 1905–06.

Leytham played on the wing, and scored two conversions in Wigan's 7-3 victory over Oldham in the Championship Final during the 1908–09 season at The Willows, Salford on Saturday 1 May 1909.

Leytham played in Wigan's victories in the Lancashire League during the 1908–09 season, 1910–11 season and 1911–12 season.

Leytham played right wing, in Wigan's 0-0 draw with Leigh in the 1905–06 Lancashire Cup Final during the 1905–06 season at Wheater's Field, Broughton, on Saturday 2 December 1905; played right wing, and scored a conversion in the 8-0 victory over Leigh in the 1905–06 Lancashire Cup Final replay during the 1905–06 season at Wheater's Field, Broughton, on Monday 11 December 1905. He played right wing, and scored a conversion in the 10-9 victory over Oldham in the 1908–09 Lancashire Cup Final during the 1908–09 season at Wheater's Field, Broughton, on Saturday 19 December 1908, and played right wing and scored a try, and two conversions in the 22-5 victory over Leigh in the 1909–10 Lancashire Cup Final during the 1909–10 season at Wheater's Field, Broughton, on Saturday 27 November 1909. He then played his last match for Wigan, and scored a try in the 8-8 draw with Hull F.C. at Central Park, Wigan, on Monday 8 April 1912, after which injury forced him to retire.

=== Notable tour matches ===
Leytham played on the wing, and scored 3-goals in Wigan's 12-8 victory over New Zealand in the 1907–1908 New Zealand rugby tour of Australia and Great Britain match at Central Park, Wigan, on Saturday 9 November 1907, and played on the wing, and scored 2-goals in the 10-7 victory over Australia in the 1908–09 Kangaroo tour of Great Britain match at Central Park, Wigan, on Saturday 9 January 1909. He then played on the wing in the 16-8 victory over Australia in the 1908–09 Kangaroo tour of Great Britain match at Central Park, Wigan, on Wednesday 20 January 1909, and played on the wing, and scored his team's sole try in the 7-2 victory over Australia in the 1911–12 Kangaroo tour of Great Britain match at Central Park, Wigan, on Saturday 28 October 1911.

=== International honours ===
Leytham played in the first ever rugby league international for England while at Wigan in 1905 against Other Nationalities; he went on to win more caps in 1906 against Other Nationalities and in 1908 against New Zealand. He also won caps for Great Britain while at Wigan in 1908 against New Zealand (2 matches), and in 1910 against Wales (2 matches).

He was selected to go on the 1910 Great Britain Lions tour of Australia and New Zealand, and played against Australia (2 matches), Australasia (2 matches), and New Zealand. In this tour's Ashes series, he set the record for the most tries in a match with four in Britain's victory in the second test.

Along with Stanley "Stan" Moorhouse, Peter Norburn, Keith Fielding, Stuart Wright, Martin Offiah and Sam Tomkins; having scored four tries, Jim Leytham, jointly holds the record for the most tries scored in an England match, scoring four tries against Other Nationalities at Odsal Stadium, Bradford on 2 January 1905.
