= Frank Shugars =

GB & Wales international rugby league & union footballer

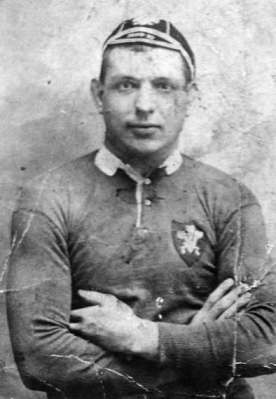

Personal information
- Full name: Francis John Shugars
- Born: 22 September 1875; Pontypridd, Wales
- Died: 16 June 1953 (aged 77); Warrington, England

Playing information
- Height: 5 ft 11 in (180 cm)
- Weight: 14 st 6 lb (92 kg)

Rugby union
Club
Years	Team	Pld	T	G	FG	P
≤1904–04	Penygraig

Rugby league
- Position: Forward
Club
Years	Team	Pld	T	G	FG	P
1904–12	Warrington	212	18	0	0	54
Representative
Years	Team	Pld	T	G	FG	P
1906	Other Nationalities	1	0	0	0	0
1909–10	Lancashire	2	0	0	0	0
1909–12	Wales	5	0	0	0	0
1910	Great Britain	1	0	0	0	0

Francis John Shugars (22 September 1875 – 16 June 1953) was a Welsh rugby union, and professional rugby league footballer who played in the 1900s and 1910s. He played club level rugby union (RU) for Penygraig RFC, and representative level rugby league (RL) for Great Britain, Wales and Lancashire, and at club level for Warrington, as a forward.

== Background ==
Frank Shugars was born in Pontypridd, Wales, and he died aged 77 in Warrington, Lancashire, England.

== Playing career ==
=== International honours ===
Frank Shugars won five caps for Wales (RL) while at Warrington between 1909 and 1912, all of them against England.

Shugars became Warrington's first player to become a Great Britain tourist when was selected to go on the 1910 Great Britain Lions tour of Australia and New Zealand, and won caps for Great Britain against Australasia and New Zealand.

=== Challenge Cup Final appearances ===
Frank Shugars played as a forward in Warrington's 6–0 victory over Hull Kingston Rovers in the 1905 Challenge Cup Final during the 1904–05 season at Headingley, Leeds on 29 April 1905, in front of a crowd of 19,638, and played as a forward in the 17–3 victory over Oldham in the 1906–07 Challenge Cup Final during the 1906–07 season at Wheater's Field, Broughton, Salford on Saturday Saturday 27 April 1907, in front of a crowd of 18,500.

=== Club career ===
Frank Shugars made his début for Warrington on Saturday 3 September 1904, and he played his last match for Warrington on Wednesday 27 March 1912.

== Honoured at Warrington Wolves ==
Frank Shugars is a Warrington Wolves Hall of Fame inductee.
