= Bill Longworth (rugby league) =

Great Britain and England international rugby league footballer

Personal information
- Full name: William Henry Longworth
- Born: c. 1884; Oldham, England
- Died: unknown

Playing information
- Position: Forward
Club
Years	Team	Pld	T	G	FG	P
1905–13	Oldham	146	18			54
1913–15	Halifax	57	4	0	0	12
	Total	203	22	0	0	66
Representative
Years	Team	Pld	T	G	FG	P
1908–13	Lancashire	5	0	0	0	0
1908–09	England	4	3	0	0	9
1908–09	Great Britain	3	0	0	0	0

William Henry Longworth (c. 1884 – death unknown) was an English professional rugby league footballer who played in the 1900s and 1910s. He played at representative level for Great Britain, England and Lancashire, and at club level for Oldham and Halifax, as a forward.

== Background ==
Bill Longworth's birth was registered in Oldham, Lancashire, England.

== Playing career ==
=== Club career ===
Longworth played local rugby at Central Rangers, Glodwick Juniors and Chadderton before making his senior debut for Oldham in April 1905. He played in Oldham's victory in the Championship during the 1904–05 season.

Longworth played as a forward in Oldham's 9–10 defeat by Wigan in the 1908 Lancashire Cup Final during the 1908–09 season at Wheater's Field, Broughton, Salford on Saturday 19 December 1908.

=== International honours ===
Bill Longworth won caps for England while at Oldham in 1908 against Wales, in 1909 against Australia (3 matches), and won caps for Great Britain while at Oldham in 1908-09 against Australia (3 matches).
