= Johnny Thomas (rugby) =

Great Britain and Wales international rugby league footballer

John Thomas
Personal information
- Full name: John Thomas
- Born: c. 1881 Aberkenfig, Wales
- Died: 25 September 1954 (aged 73) Ince, England

Playing information
- Height: 5 ft 7 in (1.70 m)
- Weight: 11 st 0 lb (70 kg)

Rugby union
- Position: Full back, Scrum-half
Club
Years	Team	Pld	T	G	FG	P
	Maesteg RFC
	Cardiff RFC
	Total	0	0	0	0	0
Representative
Years	Team	Pld	T	G	FG	P
≤1904–≤04	Monmouthshire
≤1904–≤04	Glamorgan

Rugby league
- Position: Stand-off, Scrum-half
Club
Years	Team	Pld	T	G	FG	P
1904–20	Wigan	388	108	439	0	1202
Representative
Years	Team	Pld	T	G	FG	P
≥1904–≤20	Lancashire
≥1904–≤20	Glamorgan
1908–14	Wales	8
1908–11	Great Britain	10	6	8	0	34

John "Johnny"/"Johny" Thomas (c. 1881 – 25 September 1954) was a Welsh rugby union, and professional rugby league footballer who played in the 1900s, 1910s and 1920s. He played representative level rugby union (RU) for Glamorgan and Monmouthshire, and at club level for Maesteg RFC and Cardiff RFC, as a full-back or scrum-half, and representative level rugby league (RL) for Great Britain, Wales, Glamorgan and Lancashire, and at club level for Wigan, as a stand-off or scrum-half.

== Background ==
Johnny Thomas was born in Aberkenfig, Wales, after retiring from playing, he joined the Wigan boards of directors, and he died aged 73 in Ince district, Lancashire, England.

== Playing career ==
=== International honours ===
Johnny Thomas won caps for Wales (RL) while at Wigan including in 1908 against New Zealand, and won caps for Great Britain (RL) while at Wigan in 1908 against New Zealand, and Australia, in 1909 against Australia (2 matches), on the 1910 Great Britain Lions tour of Australia and New Zealand against Australia (2 matches), and Australasia (2 matches), and New Zealand, and in 1911 against Australia.

=== County honours ===
Johnny Thomas won caps for Glamorgan (RU) while at Cardiff, including against Devonshire, and won a caps for Glamorgan (RL), and Lancashire (RL) while at Wigan.

=== Championship final appearances ===
Johnny Thomas played stand-off in Wigan's 7-3 victory over Oldham in the Championship Final during the 1908–09 season at The Willows, Salford on Saturday 1 May 1909.

=== County League appearances ===
Johnny Thomas played in Wigan's victories in the Lancashire League during the 1908–09 season, 1910–11 season, 1911–12 season, 1912–13 season, 1913–14 season and 1914–15 season.

=== County Cup Final appearances ===
Johnny Thomas played scrum-half in Wigan's 0-0 draw with Leigh in the 1905 Lancashire Cup Final during the 1905–06 season at Wheater's Field, Broughton, on Saturday 2 December 1905, played scrum-half, and scored a try in the 8-0 victory over Leigh in the 1905 Lancashire Cup Final replay during the 1905–06 season at Wheater's Field, Broughton, on Monday 11 December 1905, played stand-off, and scored a try in the 10-9 victory over Oldham in the 1908 Lancashire Cup Final during the 1908–09 season at Wheater's Field, Broughton, on Saturday 19 December 1908, played scrum-half, and scored a try in the 22-5 victory over Leigh in the 1909 Lancashire Cup Final during the 1909–10 season at Wheater's Field, Broughton, on Saturday 27 November 1909. and played scrum-half, and scored a goal in the 21-5 victory over Rochdale Hornets in the 1912 Lancashire Cup Final during the 1912–13 season at Weaste, Salford, on Wednesday 11 December 1912.

=== Notable tour matches ===
Johnny Thomas played stand-off, and scored a try, and 2-goals in Wigan's 16-8 victory over Australia in the 1908–09 Kangaroo tour of Great Britain match at Central Park, Wigan, on Wednesday 20 January 1909, and played scrum-half, and scored a goal in the 7-2 victory over Australia in the 1911–12 Kangaroo tour of Great Britain match at Central Park, Wigan, on Saturday 28 October 1911.

=== Testimonial match ===
A Testimonial match at Wigan was shared by; Bert Jenkins, Dick Ramsdale, and Johnny Thomas.
