= Tom Helm (rugby) =

GB international rugby league footballer

Personal information
- Full name: Thomas Helm
- Born: c. 1885; Hawick, Scotland
- Died: 11 August 1950 (aged 65); Sydney, Australia

Playing information
- Height: 5 ft 10.5 in (179 cm)
- Weight: 13 st 2 lb (83 kg)

Rugby union
Club
Years	Team	Pld	T	G	FG	P
≤1909–09	Hawick RFC
Representative
Years	Team	Pld	T	G	FG	P
≤1909	South of Scotland

Rugby league
- Position: Forward
Club
Years	Team	Pld	T	G	FG	P
1909–11 April	Oldham	43	6	0	0	18
1911–≥11	Coventry	0
	Total	43	6	0	0	18
Representative
Years	Team	Pld	T	G	FG	P
1910	Great Britain	0	0	0	0	0

Thomas Helm (c. 1885 – August 1950) was a Scottish rugby union and professional rugby league footballer who played in the 1900s and 1910s. He played representative level rugby union (RU) for South of Scotland, and at club level for Hawick RFC, and selected to play representative level rugby league (RL) for Great Britain (no appearances), and at club level for Oldham, and Coventry (no appearances), as a forward.

== Playing career ==
=== International honours ===
Tom Helm represented South of Scotland (RU) while at Hawick, and was selected for Great Britain (RL) while at Oldham for the 1910 Great Britain Lions tour of Australia and New Zealand. However, a knee injury sustained prior to departing on the tour, was exacerbated by a tug of war competition with the passengers on-board the P&O steamship Malwa, consequently he played no matches during the tour, and he would not play for Oldham until December 1910.

=== Club career ===
Tom Helm's final match for Oldham took place against Runcorn during April of the 1910–11 Northern Rugby Football Union season, at the end of that season, along with other Oldham players, he signed for Coventry, but he does not appear to have played any matches for Coventry.

== Death ==
His death was reported in the Hawick Express edition of 16 August 1950.

Mr Tom Helm, who was a noted forward with the " Greens " about the 1908 period, and who later went to the Northern Union game and travelled to Australia and New Zealand with a British touring team, has died suddenly in Sydney, Australia, at the age of 65. Mr Helm had lived in Australia for about 25 years, and in the Second World War served as a Sergeant-Major in the Australian Army. He leaves a wife and a married son and daughter.

His death was also reported in the Hawick News and Border Chronicle edition of 18 August 1950.

Mr Tom Helm, well-known Greens forward about 40 years ago, has died in Sydney. Australia. He was 65 years of age, and at one time toured Australia and New Zealand with British Northern Union Rugby team. He is survived by his wife, a son and daughter.
