= Tom Berecry =

Australian rugby league footballer

Personal information
- Full name: Thomas Berecry
- Born: 15 June 1886 Ashfield, New South Wales, Australia
- Died: 28 July 1962 (aged 76)

Playing information
- Position: Centre / Wing
Club
Years	Team	Pld	T	G	FG	P
1911–14	North Sydney Bears	17	9	0	0	27
Representative
Years	Team	Pld	T	G	FG	P
1911–12	New South Wales	2	1	0	0	3
1912	Australasia	1	2	0	0	6

Thomas Berecry (15 June 1886 – 28 July 1962) was an Australian rugby league footballer.

A centre and winger, Berecry played for North Sydney and was a member of the national team (under the name "Australasia") for a 1911–12 tour of Great Britain. He was used mostly on the wing and scored four tries in their win over Barrow, followed by a hat–trick against Runcorn. Only selected for the third and final international, Berecry was again utilised on a wing and contributed two tries in a 33–8 win, securing the series for Australasia.

Berecry owned the land on which the Manly Warringah Leagues Club was built.
