= William Kitchin =

William Kitchin may refer to:

- William Walton Kitchin (1866–1924), Governor of the U.S. state of North Carolina
- Billy Kitchin (William Farrington Kitchin), English rugby league footballer of the 1910s
- William H. Kitchin (1837–1901), U.S. Representative from North Carolina.

== See also ==
- William Kitchen Parker, English physician, zoologist and comparative anatomist
