= 1908–09 Lancashire Cup =

1908 Lancashire Cup
- Structure: Regional knockout competition
- Teams: 12
- Winners: Wigan
- Runners-up: Oldham

The 1908–09 Lancashire Cup was the fourth year for this regional rugby league competition and saw a final between two previous cup winners. The cup was won by Wigan who beat Oldham in the final at Wheater's Field, Broughton, Salford, by a score of 10–9. The attendance for the final was 20,000 and receipts £600.

== First round ==
With 12 clubs in the competition, the first round was arranged to draw eight teams in four fixtures with the remaining four teams receiving a bye to the second round. The draw was made in July 1908 and resulted in Barrow, Leigh, Rochdale Hornets and Swinton having a bye. The four ties were all played on 7 November 1908.

Lancashire Cup first round
Home	Score	Away	Venue
Oldham	20–5	Salford	Watersheddings
Runcorn	5–5	Broughton Rangers	Canal Street
St. Helens	6–21	Warrington	Knowsley Road
Widnes	2–14	Wigan	Lowerhouse Lane

A replay for the Broughton Rangers and Runcorn fixture was played on Monday 9 November at Broughton's Wheater's Field and ended in an 8-all draw. A second replay was arranged for Wednesday 11 November at a neutral venue, Oldham's Watersheddings. Runcorn won this second replay 10–7.

== Second round ==
The draw for the second round was made on 10 November with the ties played on 21 November 1908.

Lancashire Cup second round
Home	Score	Away	Venue
Barrow	3–5	Runcorn	Cavendish Park
Leigh	3–3	Wigan	Mather Lane
Oldham	28–3	Rochdale Hornets	Watersheddings
Swinton	2–6	Warrington	Chorley Road

The replay between Wigan and Leigh was arranged for 23 November 1908 at Wigan's Central Park. Wigan won the match 11–5 but after the game, Leigh lodged a complaint with the Northern Union that during the game, a Wigan player had left the pitch without the referee's consent in breach of the rules of the game. The Lancashire committee considered the complaint the following day and agreed that Wigan had breached the rules. The result was therefore voided and the tie ordered to be replayed the following Monday, 30 November. The replayed tie was won 17–3 by Wigan.

== Semi-finals ==
The draw was made on 25 November, at the same meeting which considered the Wigan v Leigh incident. The ties were played on 5 December 1908.

Lancashire Cup Semi-finals
Home	Score	Away	Venue
Oldham	26–7	Runcorn	Watersheddings
Wigan	15–10	Warrington	Central Park

== Final ==
The final was played at Wheater's Field on 19 December 1908. Wigan beat Oldham 10–9. The attendance of almost 21,000 was a record for the competition and the official receipts totalled £600/4/9.

19 December 1908
14:45 GMT (UTC±00:00)

Wigan	10–9	Oldham
Tries: Johnston; Thomas; Goals: Sharrock; Leytham	Report	Tries: Cook; Goals: Wood (3)

Wheater's Field
Attendance: 21,000
Referee: F. Renton

Lancashire Cup final teams
Wigan	Number	Oldham
Fullback
Jim Sharrock	1	Alf Wood
Threequarter backs
Jim Leytham	2	George Tyson
Bert Jenkins	3	George Smith
Lance Todd	4	Tom Llewellyn
Joe Miller	5	George Cook
Halfbacks
Johnny Thomas	6	Tom White
Fred Gleave	7	William Dixon
Forwards
Jack Barton	8	Albert Avery
Walter Cheetham	9	Joe Ferguson
Massa Johnston	10	Bill Longworth
Dick Ramsdale	11	Bill Nansen
Dick Silcock	12	Arthur Smith
Thomas Whittaker	13	James Wright

== See also ==
- 1908–09 Northern Rugby Football Union season
- Rugby league county cups
