= Ephraim Curzon =

GB international rugby league & union footballer

- Born: 11 March 1883 Crumpsall, Prestwich district, England
- Died: Apr 1966 (aged 83) Barton upon Irwell, Lancashire
- Height: 5 ft 11 in (1.80 m)
- Weight: 14 st 0 lb (89 kg)

Rugby union career
Senior career
Years	Team	Apps	(Points)
- Carlisle RFC
- Lismore RFC
≤1907-08	Kirkcaldy RFC		
- Rugby league career

Playing information
- Position: Forward
Club
Years	Team	Pld	T	G	FG	P
1908–11	Salford	102	8	0	0	24
Representative
Years	Team	Pld	T	G	FG	P
	Lancashire
1910	Great Britain	2	0	0	0	0

Ephraim Curzon (first ¼ 1883 – 1966) was an English soldier, and rugby union and professional rugby league footballer who played in the 1900s and 1910s. He played representative level rugby union (RU) for British Army Rugby Union, and at club level for Carlisle RFC, Lismore RFC (in Edinburgh), and Kirkcaldy RFC (in Fife), and representative level rugby league (RL) for Great Britain and Lancashire, and at club level for Salford, as a forward.

== Background ==
Ephraim Curzon's birth was registered in Crumpsall, Prestwich district, he served as a British soldier in South Africa during the Second Boer War.

== Playing career ==
=== International honours ===
Ephraim Curzon was selected to play during the 1910 Great Britain Lions tour of Australia and New Zealand (RL) while at Salford, he won caps against Australia, and Australasia.

=== Representative honours ===
Ephraim Curzon represented the British Army Rugby Union (RU) scoring both tries against South Africa.

=== Club career ===
Ephraim Curzon's last match for Salford took place against Hull Kingston Rovers in April 1911, though Salford retained Curzon's playing registration until 1915.
