= Arthur Smith (rugby) =

GB & England international rugby league footballer (died 1946)

Personal information
- Full name: Arthur Smith
- Born: c. 1880 Gloucestershire, England
- Died: 17 December 1946 (aged 66)

Playing information

Rugby union
Club
Years	Team	Pld	T	G	FG	P
≤1905–≤05	Yorkley RFC
≤1905–05	Cinderford R.F.C.
	Total	0	0	0	0	0

Rugby league
- Position: Forward
Club
Years	Team	Pld	T	G	FG	P
1905–14	Oldham	247	21			63
1914–≥14	Halifax
	Total	247	21	0	0	63
Representative
Years	Team	Pld	T	G	FG	P
1906–09	England	6	0	0	0	0
1908–09	Great Britain	6	0	0	0	0
190?	Lancashire		0	0	0	0

'Mad' Arthur Smith (c. 1880 – 17 December 1946) was an English rugby union and professional rugby league footballer who played in the 1900s and 1910s. He played club level rugby union (RU) for Yorkley RFC and Cinderford R.F.C., and representative level rugby league (RL) for Great Britain and England, and at club level for Oldham and Halifax, as a forward. He served in the First World War and was wounded by a German bullet.

== Playing career ==
=== International honours ===
Arthur Smith won caps for England (RL) while at Oldham in 1906 against Other Nationalities, in 1908 against New Zealand, and Wales, in 1909 against Australia (3 matches), and won caps for Great Britain (RL) while at Oldham in 1908 against New Zealand (3 matches), and in 1908–09 against Australia (3 matches).

=== Championship final appearances ===
Arthur Smith played as a forward in Oldham's 3–7 defeat by Wigan in the Championship Final during the 1908–09 season at The Willows, Salford on Saturday 1 May 1909.

=== Challenge Cup Final appearances ===
Arthur Smith played as a forward in Oldham's 3–17 defeat by Warrington in the 1907 Challenge Cup Final during the 1906–07 season at Wheater's Field, Broughton, Salford on Saturday 27 April 1907 in front of a crowd of 18,500, and played as a forward in the 5–8 defeat by Dewsbury in the 1912 Challenge Cup Final during the 1911–12 season at Headingley, Leeds on Saturday 27 April 1912 in front of a crowd of 16,000.

=== County Cup Final appearances ===
Arthur Smith played as a forward in Oldham's 9–10 defeat by Wigan in the 1908 Lancashire Cup Final during the 1908–09 season at Wheater's Field, Broughton, Salford on Saturday 19 December 1908.

== Nickname ==
Smith's sobriquet of 'Mad' was due to his forceful and enthusiastic style of play.
