= Billy Winstanley =

GB & England international rugby league footballer

Personal information
- Full name: William Winstanley
- Born: 1 November 1884; Platt Bridge, Wigan, England
- Died: unknown

Playing information
- Height: 5 ft 9 in (1.75 m)
- Weight: 13 st 9 lb (87 kg)
- Position: Forward
Club
| Years | Team | Pld | T | G | FG | P |
|---|---|---|---|---|---|---|
| 1906–11 | Leigh | 171 | 19 | 0 | 0 | 57 |
| 1911–19 | Wigan | 67 | 4 | | | 12 |
| | Total | 238 | 23 | 0 | 0 | 69 |
Representative
| Years | Team | Pld | T | G | FG | P |
| 1908–13 | Lancashire | 7 | 0 | 0 | 0 | 0 |
| 1910–12 | England | 4 | 0 | 0 | 0 | 0 |
| 1910–12 | Great Britain | 5 | 0 | 0 | 0 | 0 |

William Winstanley (1 November 1884 – death unknown) was an English professional rugby league footballer who played in the 1900s and 1910s. He played at representative level for Great Britain, England and Lancashire, and at club level for Platt Bridge ARLFC (in Platt Bridge, Wigan), Leigh, and Wigan, as a forward.

== Background ==
Billy Winstanley was born in Platt Bridge, Wigan, Lancashire, England.

== Playing career ==
=== County League appearances ===
Winstanley played in Wigan's victories in the Lancashire League during the 1910–11 season, 1911–12 season and 1912–13 season.

=== International honours ===
Winstanley, won caps for England while at Leigh in 1910 against Wales, while at Wigan in 1911 against Wales, and Australia, and in 1912 against Wales.

While at Leigh he was selected to go on the 1910 Great Britain Lions tour of Australia and New Zealand, and won caps for Great Britain against Australia, Australasia (2 matches), and New Zealand.

While at Wigan he played in 1911-12 against Australia (3 matches).
