= Tom Llewellyn =

GB & Wales international rugby league footballer

Personal information
- Full name: Thomas Llewellyn
- Born: 27 March 1882; Whitchurch, Cardiff, Wales
- Died: 1956; Warrington, England

Playing information

Rugby union
Club
Years	Team	Pld	T	G	FG	P
	Treherbert RFC

Rugby league
- Position: Centre
Club
Years	Team	Pld	T	G	FG	P
1904–07	Leeds
1907–12	Oldham	123	28	1	0	86
	Total	123	28	1	0	86
Representative
Years	Team	Pld	T	G	FG	P
1904–06	Other Nationalities	3	1	0	0	3
1908	Wales	2
1908	Great Britain	2	1	0	0	3

Thomas Llewellyn (1882 – 1956) was a Welsh rugby union, and professional rugby league footballer who played in the 1900s and 1910s. He played club level rugby union (RU) for Whitchurch RFC and Treherbert RFC, and representative level rugby league (RL) for Great Britain and Wales, and at club level for Leeds, Yorkshire and Oldham, as a centre.

== Playing career ==
=== International honours ===
Tom Llewellyn won caps for Wales (RL) while at Oldham in 1908, and was named captain in Wales first every rugby league international match. He won two caps for Great Britain in 1908 against New Zealand, and also won two caps for Other Nationalities, both against England.

=== Championship final appearances ===
Tom Llewellyn played left-centre in Oldham's 3–7 defeat by Wigan in the Championship Final during the 1908–09 season at The Willows, Salford on Saturday 1 May 1909.

=== County Cup Final appearances ===
Tom Llewellyn played left-centre in Oldham's 9–10 defeat by Wigan in the 1908 Lancashire Cup Final during the 1908–09 season at Wheater's Field, Broughton, Salford on Saturday 19 December 1908.
