= Bob Nicholson (rugby league, born 1880) =

Australia international rugby league footballer

Personal information
- Full name: Robert Harding Nicholson
- Born: 10 October 1880 Manning River, NSW, Australia
- Died: 31 March 1940 (aged 59) Hamilton, NSW, Australia

Playing information
- Position: Forward
Club
Years	Team	Pld	T	G	FG	P
1908	Newcastle Rebels	4	0	0	0	0
1914	North Sydney	5	0	0	0	0
	Total	9	0	0	0	0
Representative
Years	Team	Pld	T	G	FG	P
1909–12	Queensland	17	4	0	0	12
1909–10	Australia	2	1	0	0	3

Robert Harding Nicholson (10 October 1880 – 31 March 1940) was an Australian rugby league footballer.

== Biography ==
Born on the Manning River, New South Wales, Nicholson was described by The Courier-Mail as a "fast and robust forward" and was mainly utilised in either the front or second row.

Nicholson was a member of the Newcastle Rebels for the inaugural NSWRFL season. He relocated to Queensland the following season, joining South Brisbane. While in Queensland, Nicholson represented his adopted state on 17 occasions. He gained selection to the national team for their 1908–09 tour of Great Britain, but had to withdraw at the last minute. His international debut instead came during Australia's home series against New Zealand later in 1909 and he also played three of a possible four matches against a touring New Zealand Māori team that year. He also appeared in their 1910 home series against the Great Britain Lions.

In 1911, Nicholson received a two–year suspended prison sentence for bigamy.
