= Bob Craig (rugby) =

Australian rugby footballer and administrator (1885–1935)

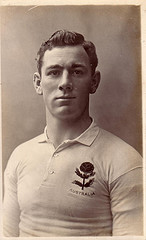
- 1908 Wallaby
- Born: Robert Robertson Craig; 1 September 1881 Sydney, New South Wales
- Died: 5 March 1935 (aged 53) Leichhardt, New South Wales

Rugby union career
- Position(s): hooker, lock
Provincial / State sides
Years	Team	Apps	(Points)
1907	New South Wales		
International career
Years	Team	Apps	(Points)
1908	Australia	1	(0)
- Rugby league career

Playing information
- Position: Second rower
Club
Years	Team	Pld	T	G	FG	P
1910–19	Balmain	92				47
Representative
Years	Team	Pld	T	G	FG	P
1910–11	New South Wales	2				0
1910–14	Australia	7				3
Medal record
Men's rugby union
Representing Australasia
Olympic Games
Gold medal – first place	1908 London	Team competition

Robert Robertson Craig (1 September 1881 – 5 March 1935) was an Australian rugby union and pioneer professional rugby league footballer who represented his country at both sports - a dual-code rugby international. He was a member of the Australian rugby union team, which won the gold medal at the 1908 Summer Olympics. Prior to his rugby career he won state championships in swimming and soccer and played top-level water polo.

Craig as a 1911 Kangaroo

== All round sportsman ==
Prior to his rugby career, Craig was one of Australia's greatest all-round sportsmen. He won eight consecutive State swimming championships between 1899 and 1906; he appeared in four Sydney premiership winning water polo sides and in 1905 he was a member of the Balmain soccer club which that year won the Gardiner Cup, the NSW State competition.

== Rugby union career ==
Nicknamed 'Boneta' to this rugby friends, Craig was chosen from the Balmain club to represent Australia on its 1908-09 Wallabies tour of Great Britain and North America. During the tour Craig played in one Test match against Wales. He famously carried with him a carpet snake on the ship to Britain and smuggled it through customs with the aid of team mate Tom Richards. Craig won an Olympic gold medal in London in the Wallabies team captained by Chris McKivat who defeated England (represented by Cornwall county XV). On his return to Australia, he joined the fledgling code of rugby league along with 13 of his Olympic teammates.

== Rugby league career ==
His club football was played with the Balmain Tigers whom he helped to win four premierships between 1915 and 1919.

Craig made his international league debut in the first test in Sydney on 18 June 1910. Four of his former Wallaby teammates also debuted that day John Barnett, Jack Hickey, Charles Russell and Chris McKivat – making them collectively Australia's 11th to 15th dual code internationals. This repeated a similar occurrence two years earlier when five former Wallabies in Micky Dore, Dally Messenger, Denis Lutge, Doug McLean snr and John Rosewell all debuted for the Kangaroos in the first ever test against New Zealand, he also represented Australasia.

Craig played in both rugby league tests against Great Britain in Australia in 1910 and was selected on the 1911–12 Kangaroo tour of Great Britain. He played 31 tour matches and scored 7 tries. He played at second row in all three victorious tests of the tour. He is listed on the Australian Players Register as Kangaroo No.64.

He returned to representative honors in 1914 playing two tests when Australia hosted the Great Britain tourists. All up, Craig played in seven rugby league tests and thirty-five times for Australia.

== Post-football ==
Craig was secretary of the Balmain Tigers between 1919 and 1922 and was also a delegate to the NSWRFL in 1923–1924. For a period, he served as a state selector. He spent some years in Inverell, New South Wales as a publican at the Royal Hotel.

In the financial crises of the 1930s, he suffered losses and saw a bleak future ahead. He died by suicide by hanging himself at a hospital in Leichhardt after being mentally ill for some time. Bob Craig was privately cremated at Rookwood. He was survived by his wife, Eleanor, and three children.

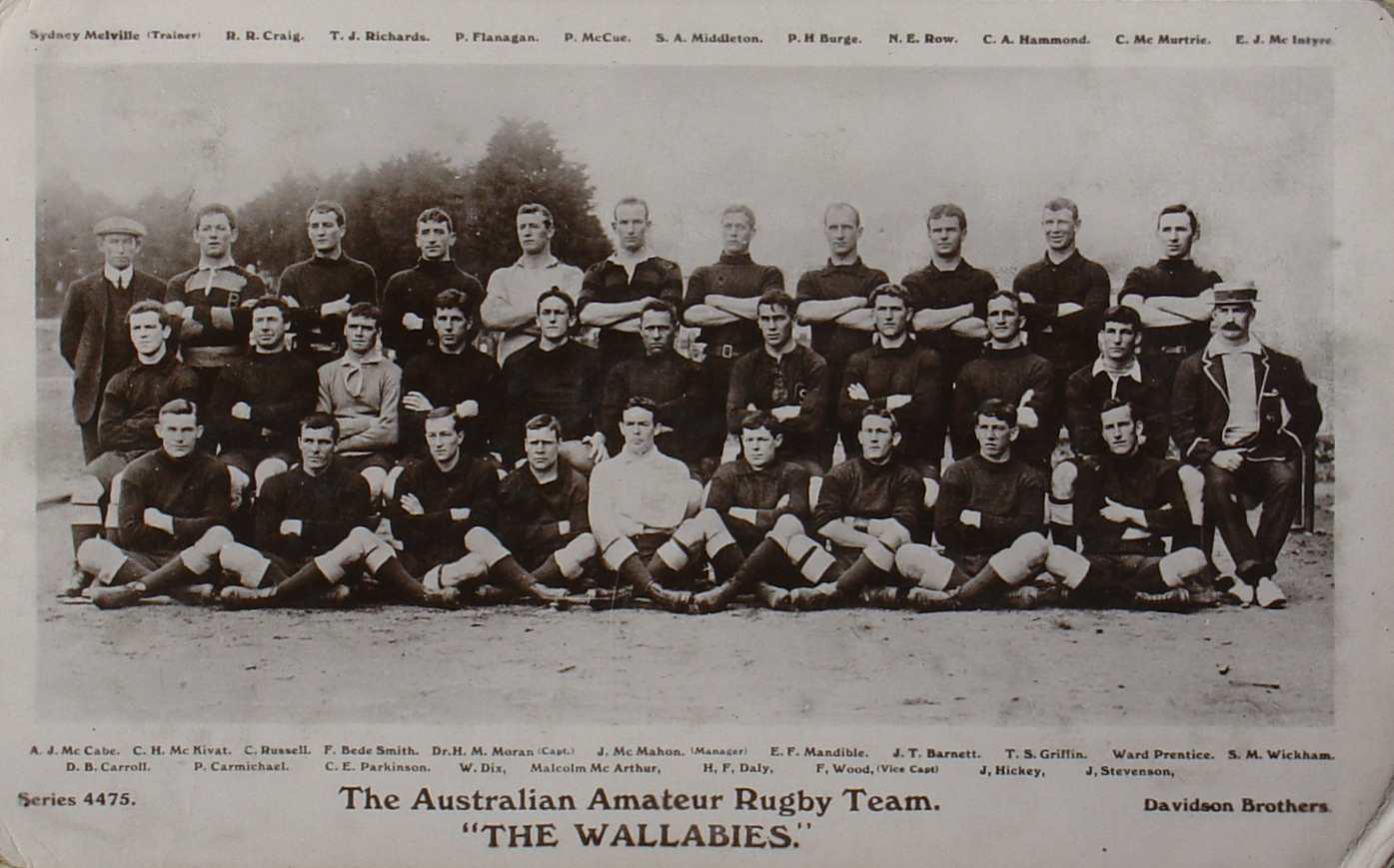
Craig back row 2nd from left, with the 1908 Wallaby tour squad

== See also ==
- Rugby union at the 1908 Summer Olympics
