= Charlie Woodhead =

Australian rugby league footballer

Personal information
- Full name: Charles Woodhead, Jr
- Born: 12 August 1885 Brisbane, Queensland, Australia
- Died: 13 June 1970 (aged 84)

Playing information
- Position: Centre / Winger
Representative
Years	Team	Pld	T	G	FG	P
1909–12	Queensland	10	4	0	0	12
1909–10	Australia	4	5	0	0	15

Charles Woodhead Junior (12 August 1885 – 13 June 1970) was an Australian rugby league footballer.

A three quarter, Woodhead was recruited to North Brisbane from rugby union during the inaugural QRL season in 1909, the same year he made his state representative debut. He also played twice for Australia in 1909, as a centre against the touring New Zealand team, and scored two tries on both outings. In 1910, Woodhead gained further international honours when he featured in two home Test matches against Great Britain, this time on a wing.

Woodhead was head of Brisbane carrying company Beys Ltd.
