= Charles Russell (rugby) =

Australia dual-code international rugby player

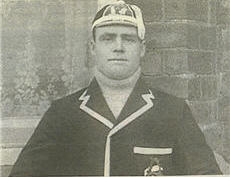
- Charles Russell in 1920
- Born: Charles Joseph Russell; 5 December 1884 St Peters, New South Wales
- Died: 15 May 1957 (aged 72) Tempe, New South Wales

Rugby union career
- Position: Wing
Amateur team(s)
Years	Team	Apps	(Points)
- Newtown Rugby Union
International career
Years	Team	Apps	(Points)
1907–09	Australia	5	(9)
- Rugby league career

Playing information
- Position: Wing
Club
Years	Team	Pld	T	G	FG	P
1910–19	Newtown	69				259
Representative
Years	Team	Pld	T	G	FG	P
1910–12	Australia	3				3

Coaching information
Club
Years	Team	Gms	W	D	L	W%
1933	Newtown
Medal record
Men's rugby union
Representing Australasia
Olympic Games
Gold medal – first place	1908 London	Team competition

Charles "Boxer" Joseph Russell (5 December 1884 – 15 May 1957) was a pioneer Australian rugby union and rugby league footballer and coach. He represented his country in both sports and was one of Australia's early dual-code rugby internationals. He was a gold medallist at the 1908 Summer Olympics.

== Rugby union career ==
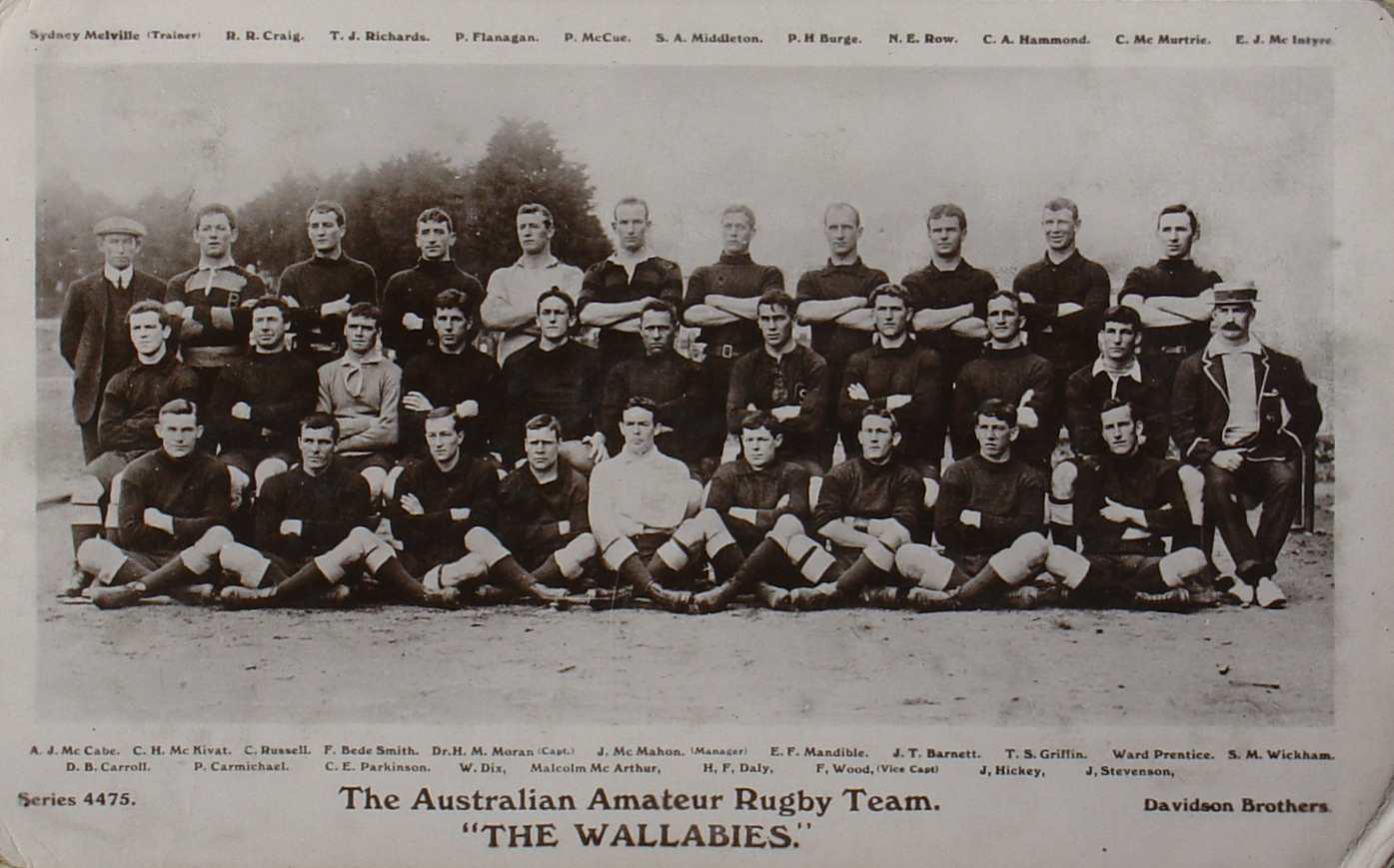
Russell middle row 3rd from left, with the 1908 Wallaby tour squad

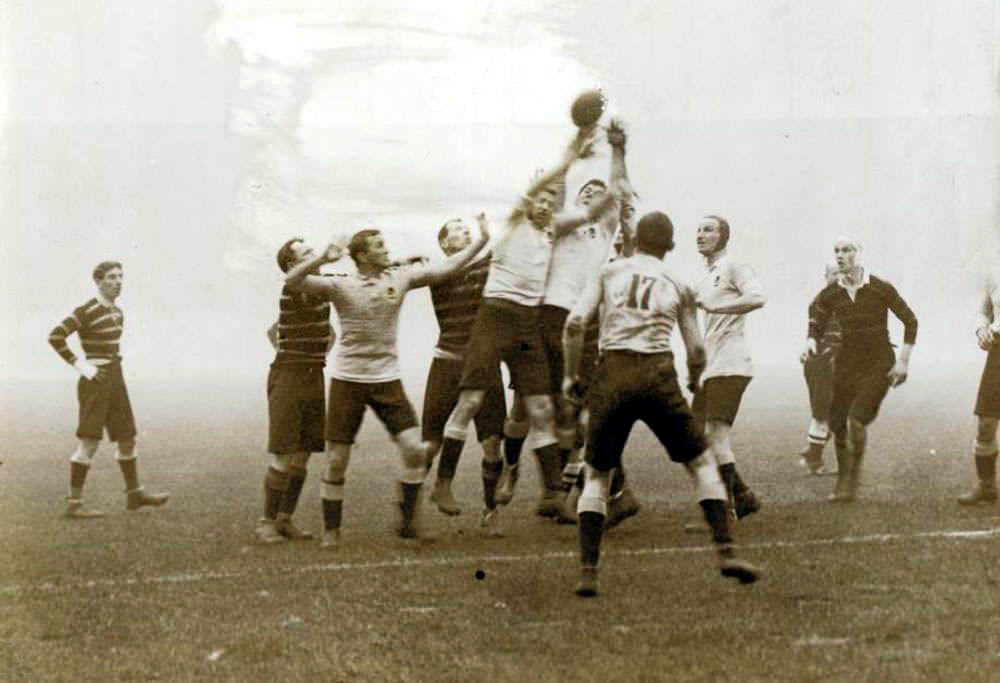
1908 Olympic Gold Final Wallabies v Cornwall

Russell was a centre/winger whose club rugby was played with the Newtown RUFC in Sydney. He played three Tests for the Wallabies in 1907 against the All Blacks before being selected for the first Wallaby tour of Britain in 1908. He played in both Tests of the tour, scoring tries in each. His 24 tries in all games of that tour still stands as Wallaby record. He was a member of the Australian Olympic team who won Gold in London in 1908 in the team captained by Chris McKivat.

== Rugby league career ==
On his return to Australia, he joined the fledgling code of rugby league along with 13 of his Olympic teammates. He played at full-back in the first Test against Great Britain in 1910 when Australia hosted the tourists. He was selected in 1911 for the second Kangaroo tour of Great Britain and played in 24 tour matches, scoring 9 tries. He played on the wing in the victorious first and second tests of 1911.

During the 1910 Great Britain Lions tour of Australia and New Zealand, the first ever, Russell made his international league début in the first test in Sydney on 18 June. Four of his former Wallaby teammates also debuted that day John Barnett, Bob Craig, Jack Hickey and Chris McKivat - making them collectively Australia's 11th to 15th dual code internationals. This repeated a similar occurrence two years earlier when five former Wallabies in Micky Dore, Dally Messenger, Denis Lutge, Doug McLean snr and John Rosewell all debuted for the Kangaroos in the first ever test against New Zealand.

His club football was with Newtown, where he played for 7 seasons. He was captain-coach of the Newtown premiership-winning side of 1910, landing two goals to tie the final against South Sydney 4-4, thus enabling Newtown to win the premiership.

Russell was also selected for the 1911–12 Kangaroo tour of Great Britain.

== Post playing ==
Russell coached Newtown for a number of years, including the premiership winning team of 1933. He was a graded referee and served as an Australian rugby league selector for a number of years.

Charles Russell was awarded Life Membership of the New South Wales Rugby League in 1944. In 2008, the centenary year of rugby league in Australia, Russell was named in the Newtown Jets 18-man team of the century.

== See also ==
- Rugby union at the 1908 Summer Olympics
