= Jack Hickey (rugby) =

Australia dual-code rugby international player

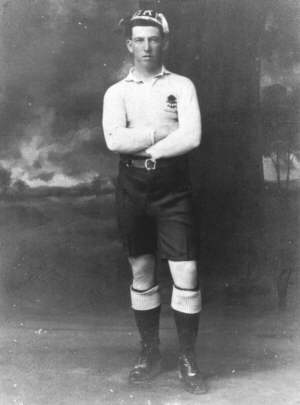
- Hickey with test cap and team kit, 1909
- Born: John Joseph Hickey; 4 January 1887 Sydney, NSW
- Died: 15 May 1950 (aged 63) Darlinghurst, New South Wales

Rugby union career
- Position: centre
International career
Years	Team	Apps	(Points)
1908-09	Australia	2	(0)
- Rugby league career

Playing information
- Position: Three-quarter
Club
Years	Team	Pld	T	G	FG	P
1910–15	Glebe	54				100
1911	Balmain	10				26
	Total	64	0	0	0	126
Representative
Years	Team	Pld	T	G	FG	P
1910	Australia	2				5
Medal record
Men's rugby union
Representing Australasia
Olympic Games
Gold medal – first place	1908 London	Team competition

Jack "Darb" Hickey (4 January 1887 – 15 May 1950) was an Australian rugby union and pioneer professional rugby league footballer and represented his country at both sports. He was one of Australia's early dual-code rugby internationals. He competed in the 1908 Summer Olympics in rugby union and was notable for scoring the first ever try for the Australian national side in a rugby league test match.

== Rugby union career ==
Hickey toured Britain and North America with the Wallabies captained by Paddy Moran in 1908–09. He earned two test caps against Wales and England on the tour and was a member of the Olympic gold medal-winning Wallabies at the 1908 London Games. On his return to Australia, he joined the fledgling code of rugby league along with 13 of his Olympic teammates.

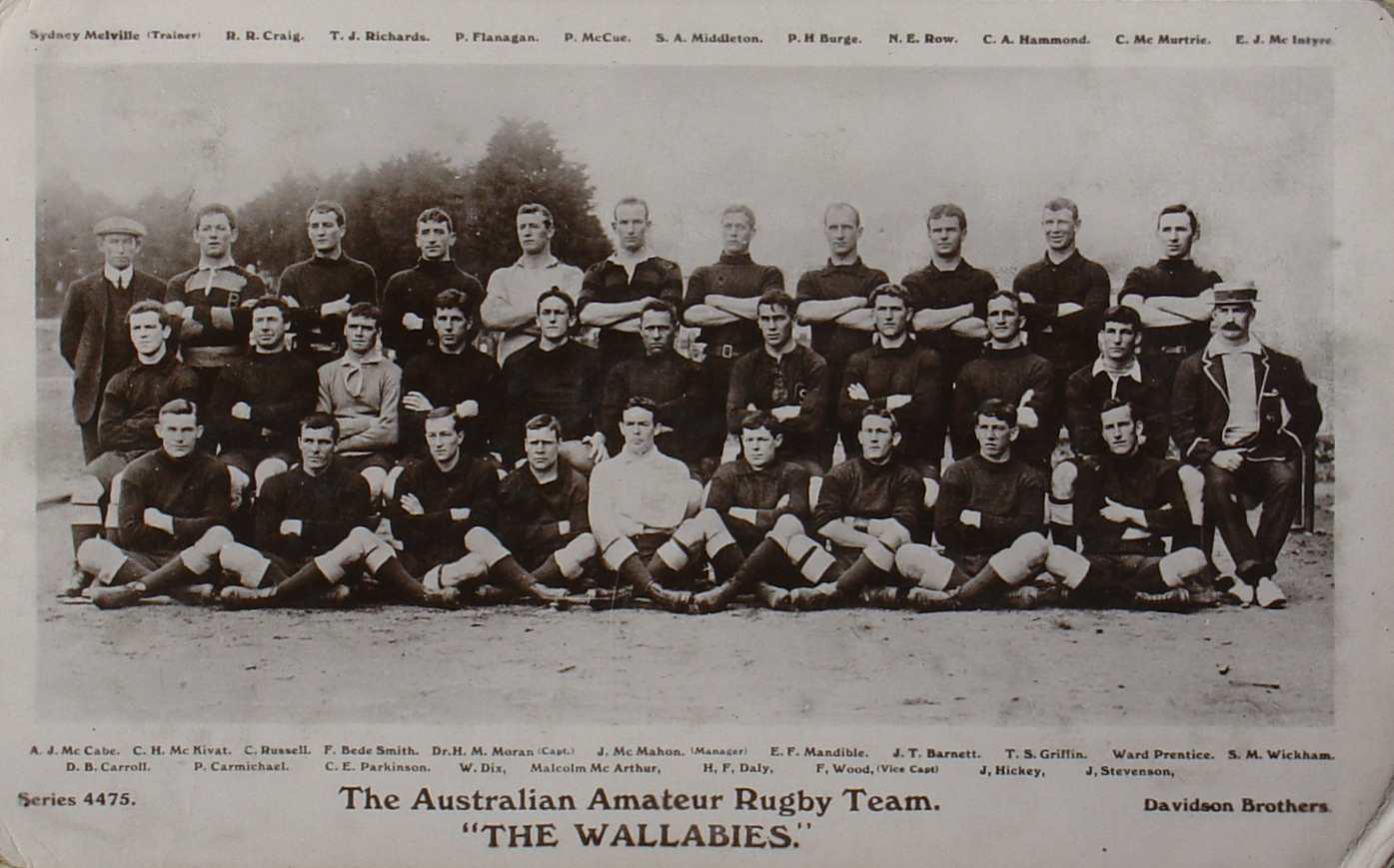
Hickey front row 2nd from right, with the 1908 Wallaby tour squad

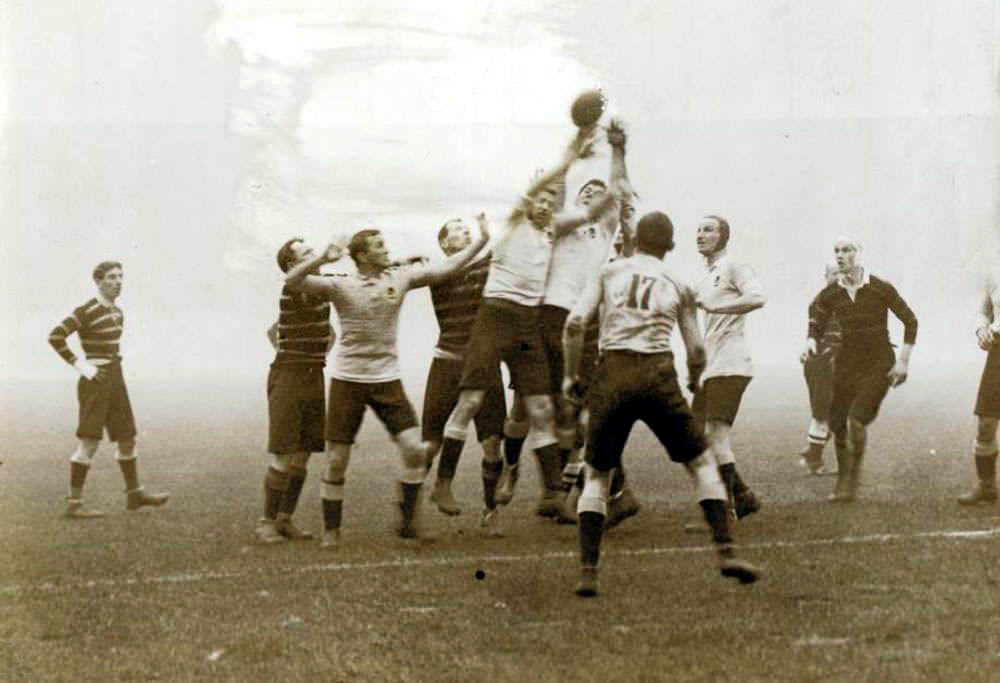
1908 Olympic Gold Final Wallabies v Cornwall

== Rugby league career ==
Hickey made his international league debut in the first test in Sydney on 18 June 1910. Four of his former Wallaby teammates also debuted that day John Barnett, Bob Craig, Charles Russell and Chris McKivat - making them collectively Australia's 11th to 15th dual code internationals. This mirrored a similar occurrence two years earlier when five former Wallabies in Micky Dore, Dally Messenger, Denis Lutge, Doug McLean snr and John Rosewell all debuted for the Kangaroos in the first ever test against New Zealand.

He played in both rugby league tests of the 1910 Great Britain Lions tour of Australasia, the first ever, and scored the first ever try for Australia in a rugby league test match. Hickey played 4 seasons with Glebe (rugby league team) and one season at Balmain Tigers during his club career.

== Death ==
Hickey died of cancer on 15 May 1950 at the Sacred Heart Hospice, St. Vincent's Hospital. He was aged 63 and was survived by his eight children. A well attended funeral was held for Darb, and he was buried at Rookwood Cemetery on 16 May 1950.

== See also ==
- Rugby union at the 1908 Summer Olympics
