= Albert Avery =

Great Britain and England international rugby league footballer

- Full name: Albert Edward Avery
- Born: c. 1883 Buckfastleigh, England
- Died: 14 November 1914 (aged 31) Oldham, England
- Height: 5 ft 10.5 in (1.791 m)
- Weight: 14 st 4 lb (91 kg)

Rugby union career
Senior career
| Years | Team | Apps | (Points) |
| ≤1905 | Plymouth and Devonport Albion | | |
| ≤1905 | Devon | | |
- Rugby league career

Playing information
- Position: Centre, Stand-off, Forward
Club
| Years | Team | Pld | T | G | FG | P |
|---|---|---|---|---|---|---|
| 1905–14 | Oldham | 289 | 67 | 0 | 0 | 201 |
Representative
| Years | Team | Pld | T | G | FG | P |
| ≥1905–≤14 | Lancashire | ≥5 |
| 1910–11 | England | 5 | 1 | 0 | 0 | 3 |
| 1910–12 | Great Britain | 4 | 3 | 0 | 0 | 9 |

Albert Edward "Bert" Avery (c. 1883 – 14 November 1914) was an English rugby union and professional rugby league footballer who played in the 1900s and 1910s. He played representative level rugby union (RU) for Devon, and at club level for Plymouth and Devonport Albion, and representative level rugby league (RL) for Great Britain, England and Lancashire, and at club level for Oldham, as a centre, stand-off, or more usually as a forward.

== Background ==
Avery was born in Buckfastleigh, Devon, and his death aged 31 was registered in Oldham, Lancashire, England, he died one-year after his brother had died in similar circumstances.

== Playing career ==
=== Rugby union ===
Avery won 23-caps for Devon (RU) while at Plymouth and Devonport Albion.

=== Rugby league ===
Avery played as a forward in Oldham's 3–7 defeat by Wigan in the Championship Final during the 1908–09 season at The Willows, Salford on Saturday 1 May 1909.

Avery played as a forward in Oldham's 3–17 defeat by Warrington in the 1907 Challenge Cup Final during the 1906–07 season at Wheater's Field, Broughton, Salford on Saturday 27 April 1907, in front of a crowd of 18,500, and played as a forward and was sent-off for "being impertinent to the referee" in the 5–8 defeat by Dewsbury in the 1912 Challenge Cup Final during the 1911–12 season at Headingley, Leeds on Saturday 27 April 1912, in front of a crowd of 15,271.

Avery played as a forward in Oldham's 9–10 defeat by Wigan in the 1908 Lancashire Cup Final during the 1908–09 season at Wheater's Field, Broughton, Salford on Saturday 19 December 1908.

=== Representative honours ===
Avery played four trial matches for England (RU) while at Plymouth and Devonport Albion, and won caps for England (RL) while at Oldham in 1910 against Wales (2 matches), in 1911 against Wales, and Australia (2 matches).

While at Oldham he was selected to go on the 1910 Great Britain Lions tour of Australia and New Zealand, and won caps for Great Britain against Australia, Australasia, and New Zealand, and in 1911–12 against Australia (2 matches).

Avery also played for Lancashire (RL) while at Oldham.

== Illness and death ==
Avery was taken ill during the summer of 1914, and a Testimonial match (in which Avery did not participate due to illness) between players from the 1910 Great Britain Lions tour of Australia and New Zealand and Colonial players of the British Empire took place at Watersheddings, Oldham on 14 September 1914. On 14 November 1914, Avery died at his home in Oldham.
