= John Barnett (rugby) =

Australia dual-code rugby international player

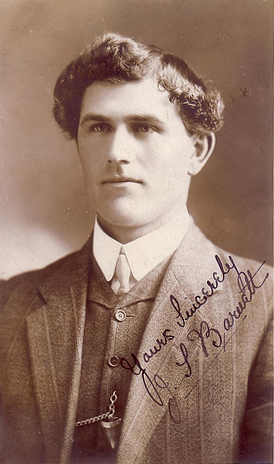
- Barnett in 1908
- Born: John Thomas Barnett; 19 January 1880 Carcoar, New South Wales
- Died: 2 October 1918 (aged 38) Parramatta, New South Wales

Rugby union career
- Position(s): Lock, prop
Amateur team(s)
Years	Team	Apps	(Points)
1903-09	Newtown RUFC		
1906	Lithgow RU		
International career
Years	Team	Apps	(Points)
1907-09	Australia	5	(0)
- Rugby league career

Playing information
- Position: Second-row
Club
Years	Team	Pld	T	G	FG	P
1910–15	Newtown	74				18
Representative
Years	Team	Pld	T	G	FG	P
1910–11	New South Wales	3				0
1910	Australia	2				6
Medal record
Men's rugby union
Representing Australasia
Olympic Games
Gold medal – first place	1908 London	Team competition

John Thomas "Towser" Barnett (19 January 1880 – 2 October 1918) was a pioneer Australian rugby union and rugby league footballer who won an Olympic gold medal for rugby at the 1908 Summer Olympics. He was one of Australia's early dual-code rugby internationals.

== Rugby union career ==
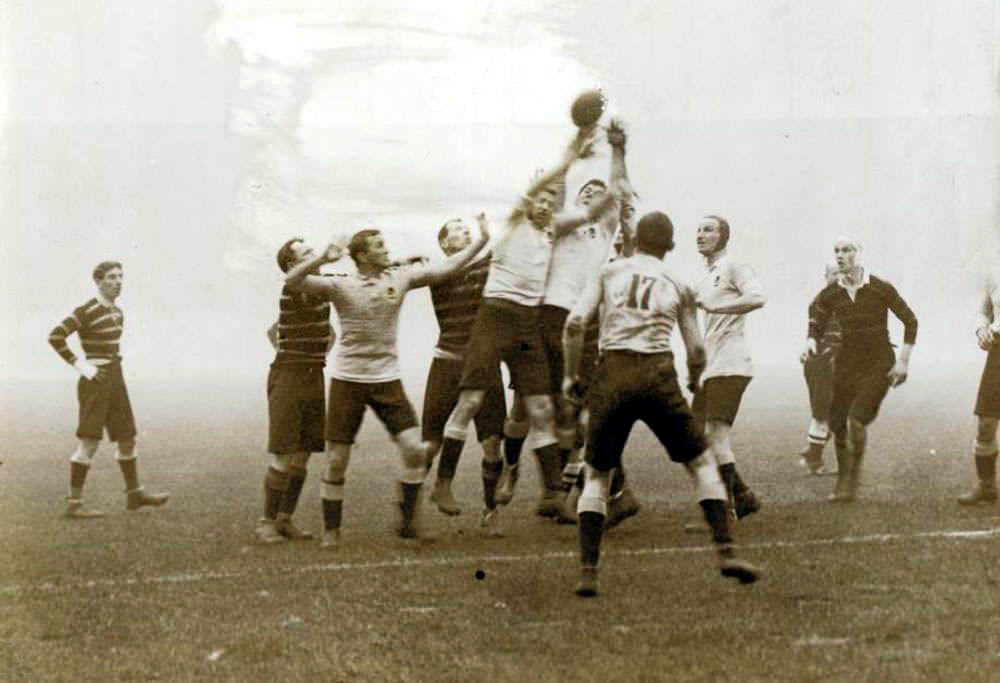
1908 Olympic Gold Final Wallabies v Cornwall

A hooker/prop with the Newtown Rugby Union club in Sydney, Barnett was selected five times to play representative rugby for Australia. His debut was against New Zealand, in Sydney, on 20 July 1907.

Barnett was selected to the first Wallaby 1908–09 Australia rugby union tour of Britain, the squad captained by Herbert Moran. That side competed in the 1908 Summer Olympics in London and Barnett was a member of the Australia national rugby union team captained by Chris McKivat which won the gold medal.

On his return to Australia, he joined the fledgling code of rugby league along with fourteen of his Olympic teammates.

== Rugby league career ==
Barnett and five other gold medal-winning Wallabies joined the Newtown club in Sydney in 1910 where he played the next six seasons. He was a member of the premiership winning Newtown side in 1910. He was selected in both Ashes tests against Great Britain in 1910 when Australia hosted the tourists.

Barnett made his international league debut in the first test in Sydney on 18 June 1910. Four of his former Wallaby teammates also debuted that day Bob Craig, Jack Hickey, Charles Russell and Chris McKivat - making them collectively Australia's 11th to 15th dual code internationals. This mirrored a similar occurrence two years earlier when five former Wallabies in Micky Dore, Dally Messenger, Denis Lutge, Doug McLean snr and John Rosewell all debuted for the Kangaroos in the same match — the first ever test against New Zealand.

== Death ==
Barnett died on 2 October 1918, aged 38 at the Parramatta District Hospital from the effects of meningitis after a three-week battle with pneumonia. He was survived by his wife and two daughters. He was buried at Rookwood Cemetery on 4 October 1918. As a tribute to "Towser" Barnett, a fund was set up by The Referee newspaper to raise money for his widow and family. By the November the fund had raised over £64, many donations were made up by his first grade rugby mates, at a time when spare money was often in short supply.

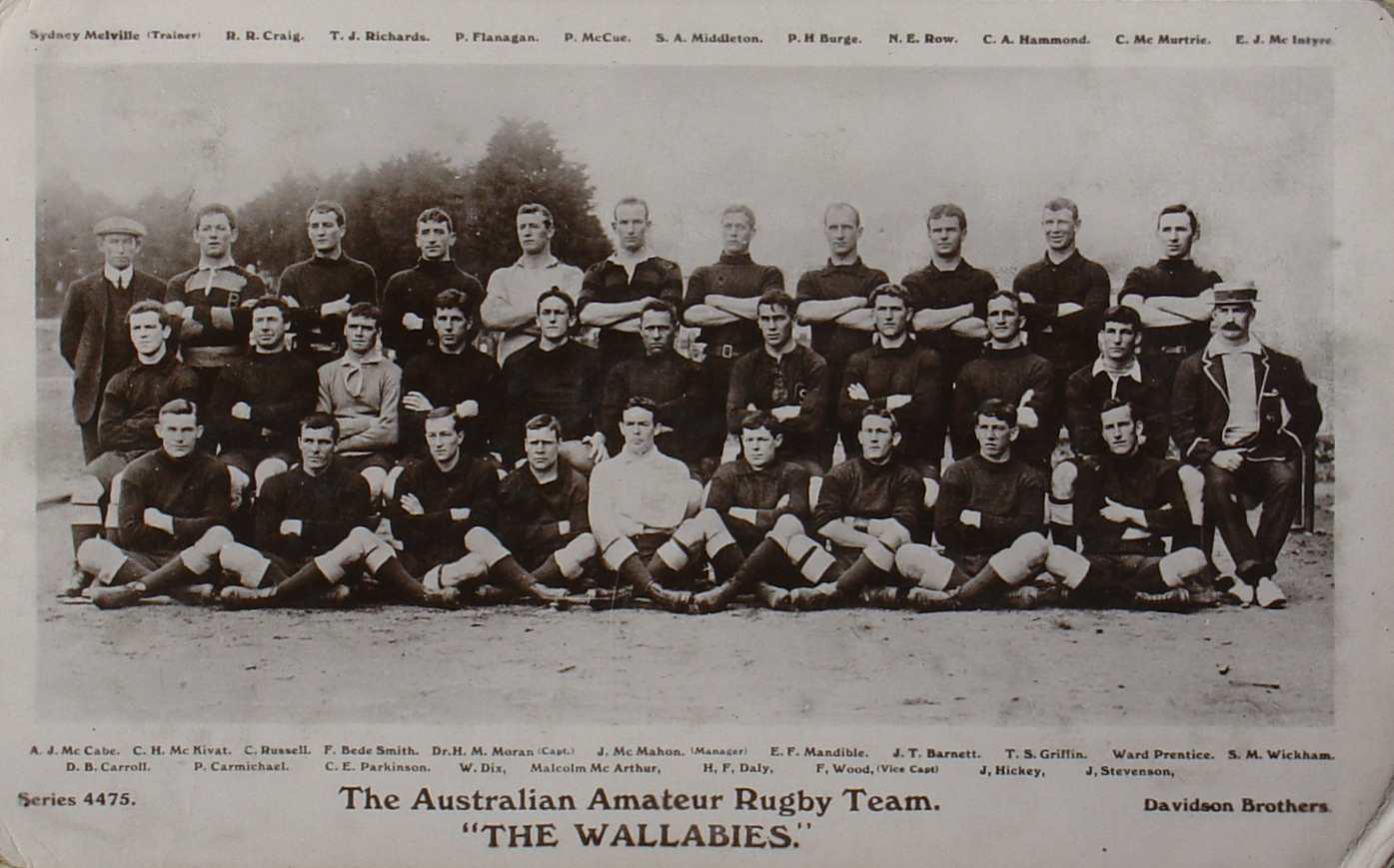
Barnett middle row 4th from right, with the 1908 Wallaby tour squad

== See also ==
- Rugby union at the 1908 Summer Olympics
