= Billy Kitchin =

England international rugby league footballer

Personal information
- Full name: William Farrington Kitchin
- Born: 28 July 1882 Cleator, Cumberland, England
- Died: 22 September 1960 (aged 78) Whiston, Lancashire, England

Playing information
- Position: Wing
Club
Years	Team	Pld	T	G	FG	P
1900–13	Huddersfield	296	211	17		667
Representative
Years	Team	Pld	T	G	FG	P
	Cumberland
1911	England	2	3	0		9

William Farrington Kitchin (Note: William Kitchin's surname is variously spelt with an 'i', as Kitchin, or with an 'e' as Kitchen.) (28 July 1882 – 22 September 1960) was an English professional rugby league footballer who played in the 1900s and 1910s. He played at representative level for England, and at club level for Huddersfield, as a wing.

== Background ==
William Kitchin was born in Whitehaven, Cumberland, England.

== Playing career ==
=== Career records ===
Kitchin was the league's top try-scorer in the 1910–11 season with 41-tries.

=== International honours ===
Kitchin won caps for England while at Huddersfield in 1911 against Wales, and Australia.
