= Coventry RLFC =

English rugby league team

Coventry RLFC was a semi-professional rugby league team based in Coventry, West Midlands, England, that played in the Northern Rugby Football Union League in the 1910–11, 1911–12, and 1912–13 seasons.

== History ==
The club was formed in 1910 by players converting to Northern Union from rugby union. The club was admitted to the Northern Union in December 1910 in time for the start of the 1910–11 season. The new league club took over the tenancy of the Butts previously the home of Coventry rugby union club. Results on the field were poor and as a consequence, so were attendances. Receipts were not sufficient to sustain the club and Coventry RLFC folded after completion of the 1912–13 season.

=== Today ===
Rugby League returned to Coventry in 1998 when Coventry Bears was formed, playing in the third tier League 1, and from 2004 to 2021 also played at the Butts, now called Butts Park Arena. In 2022 the Bears, now renamed Midlands Hurricanes moved out of the city.

== Club league record ==
For the 1910–11 to 1912–13 seasons, Coventry RLFC achieved the following record:

Season	Competition	Pos	Team Name	Pl	W	D	L	PW	PA	Diff	Pts	% Pts	No of teams in league	Notes	Ref
1910-11	RL	27	Coventry	32	6	1	25	288	524	-236	13	20.31	28		
1911-12	RL	23	Coventry	34	6	2	26	208	646	-438	14	20.58	27		
1912-13	RL	26	Coventry	27	0	1	26	157	896	-739	1	1.85	26		

Heading Abbreviations
RL = Single division; Pl = Games played; W = Win; D = Draw; L = Lose; PF = Points for; PA = Points against; Diff = Points difference (+ or -); Pts = League points
% Pts = A percentage system was used to determine league positions due to clubs playing varying number of fixtures and against different opponents
League points: for win = 2; for draw = 1; for loss = 0.

== Notable players ==
- John "Jack" Tomes (born 1885 in Rugby, and died 1960 in Coventry) won a cap with England in 1910, when he joined the English side against Wales for a friendly at Coventry.

== See also ==
- List of defunct rugby league clubs
