= Jim Davies (rugby) =

GB & Wales international rugby league footballer

Personal information
- Full name: James Jones Davies
- Born: 23 February 1882 Wales
- Died: 30 June 1971 (aged 89)

Playing information
- Height: 5 ft 8.5 in (1.740 m)
- Weight: 11 st 8 lb (73 kg)

Rugby union
Club
Years	Team	Pld	T	G	FG	P
1900–07	Swansea RFC

Rugby league
- Position: Stand-off, Scrum-half
Club
Years	Team	Pld	T	G	FG	P
1907–20	Huddersfield	265
Representative
Years	Team	Pld	T	G	FG	P
≥1909–≤20	Yorkshire	≥1
1909–12	Wales	3	0	0	0	0
1911–12	Great Britain	2	0	0	0	0

Coaching information
Club
Years	Team	Gms	W	D	L	W%
1920–≥20	Keighley

James "Jim" Davies (born 23 February 1882 – 30 June 1971) was a Welsh rugby union, and professional rugby league footballer nicknamed "The Dancing Master" who played in the 1900s, 1910s and 1920s, and coached rugby league in the 1920s. He played club level rugby union (RU) for Swansea RFC, and representative level rugby league (RL) for Great Britain, Wales and Yorkshire, and at club level for Huddersfield, as a stand-off, or scrum-half, and coached at club level for Keighley.

== Playing career ==
=== County Cup Final appearances ===
Jim Davies played stand-off in Huddersfield's 2–8 defeat by Wakefield Trinity in the 1910 Yorkshire Cup Final during the 1910–11 season at Headingley, Leeds on Saturday 3 December 1910.

=== Club career ===
In the 1911–12 season, Jim Davies became the first Welshman to score more than 200-points in a season, he made his final appearance for Huddersfield in April of the 1919–20 season.

=== International honours ===
Davies won 3 caps for Wales (RL) in 1909–1912 while at Huddersfield, and won caps for Great Britain (RL) while at Huddersfield in 1911 against Australia, and in 1912 against Australia.
