= Chris McKivat =

Australian rugby player

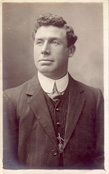
- McKivat in 1908
- Born: Christopher Hobart McKivat; 27 November 1880 Cumnock, New South Wales
- Died: 4 May 1941 (aged 60) Camperdown, New South Wales
- Height: 175 cm (5 ft 9 in)
- Weight: 76 kg (12 st 0 lb)

Rugby union career
- Position(s): fly-half Five-eighth & halfback
Amateur team(s)
Years	Team	Apps	(Points)
1895–1900	Bowen Brothers		
1900–05	Wellington		
1905	Glebe Rugby Union		
Provincial / State sides
Years	Team	Apps	(Points)
1903–04	Central Western		
1905–1909	New South Wales	16	
International career
Years	Team	Apps	(Points)
1907–09	Wallabies	4	(0)
- Rugby league career

Playing information
- Position: Halfback
Club
Years	Team	Pld	T	G	FG	P
1910–14	Glebe Dirty Reds	54				15
Representative
Years	Team	Pld	T	G	FG	P
1910–12	New South Wales	13				15
1910–12	Australia	5				12

Coaching information
Representative
Years	Team	Gms	W	D	L	W%
1915–20	Glebe Dirty Reds
1920–22	North Sydney
1928	Western Suburbs
Medal record
Men's rugby union
Representing Australasia
Olympic Games
Gold medal – first place	1908 London	Team competition

Christopher Hobart McKivat (alternatively spelled McKivatt, pronounced /məkaɪvət/; 27 November 1880 − 4 May 1941) was an Australian rugby union and rugby league player – a dual-code rugby international. He represented the Wallabies in over 20 tests and tour matches from 1907 to 1909 and the Kangaroos in five tests from 1910 to 1912. He is unique in Australian rugby history as the only man to captain both the national rugby union and rugby league teams. Following his playing career, he became the most successful coach of North Sydney in the club's history.

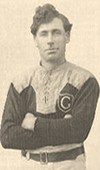
Chris McKivat

== Unique in history ==
He captained the 1908 Summer Olympics gold medal-winning Wallaby side and was the eighth captain of the Australian national rugby league team, leading them in all three tests of the 1911–12 tour. Thus, he captained his country to victory on tour in two different rugby codes.

== Rugby union career ==
McKivat was born in Cumnock, New South Wales and educated by the Patrician Brothers in Orange. He played country rugby union with the "Our Boys" club in Orange and was regularly selected in country representative teams until he was 26. He was a tactically brilliant half-back and a great on-field leader of both forwards and backs.

Affectionately known as the "hairy bloke", he moved to Sydney to join the Glebe Rugby Club in 1905 and played five-eighth for four seasons outside Fred Wood who would later be vice-captain of the 1908–09 Wallabies. McKivat was selected for New South Wales in 1905 to represent against the visiting All Blacks and then for the Wallabies in 1907 playing three tests against the All Blacks. He was on the first Wallaby tour of the United Kingdom in 1908–09 and captained the side in 17 tour matches, including the historic gold medal-winning match against Cornwall representing England in the 1908 London Olympics.

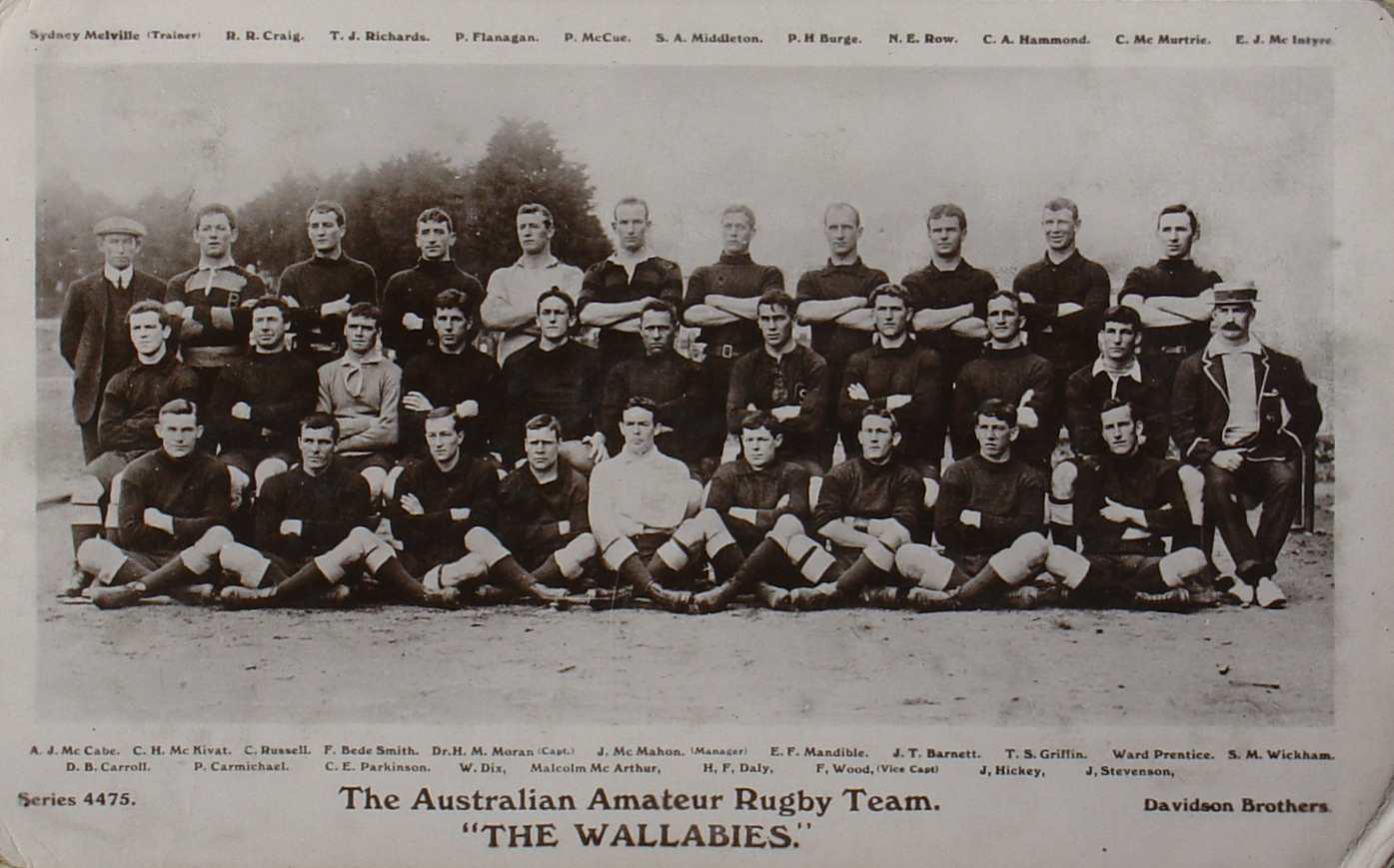
McKivatt middle row 2nd from left, with the 1908 Wallaby tour squad

== Rugby league career ==
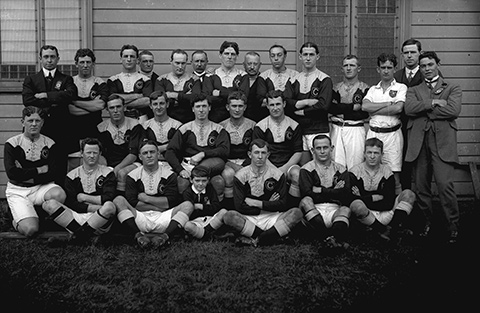
Glebe RLFC 1911 McKivat (centre with ball), flanked by Roy Algie left Frank Burge right

McKivat crossed over to the professional code joining the Glebe Rugby League Club as a 29-year-old veteran in 1910.

He made his rugby league international debut that same year in the first test in Sydney on 18 June 1910 against Great Britain.Four of his former Wallaby teammates also debuted that day John Barnett, Bob Craig, Jack Hickey and Charles Russell – making them collectively Australia's 11th to 15th dual code internationals.This repeated a similar occurrence two years earlier when five former Wallabies in Micky Dore, Dally Messenger, Denis Lutge, Doug McLean snr and John Rosewell all debuted for the Kangaroos in the first ever test against New Zealand.

The crowning achievement of his distinguished football career came on the 1911–12 Kangaroo tour of Great Britain when he captained Australia in all three tests against Great Britain for two wins and one draw to a series victory that would not be equalled for more than 50 years.

Australia's first Rugby League Ashes success was testament to his on-field genius and off-field leadership. He played in 31 matches on Tour (30 successive appearances) and scored 10 tries. The Heads/Middleton reference describes him a being revered on that tour – a magnificent general, tough, durable and an inspiration to the men around him. It quotes Johnny Quinlan, the tour co-manager "He always set a splendid example in conduct and training – a natural leader".

Chris McKivat is listed on the Australian Players Register as Kangaroo No. 67.

His representative career ended at age 32 with that Ashes success, and in retirement, he became the first of the game's high-profile non-playing coaches. He coached Glebe, Wests, and Norths in the following years, including North Sydney's premiership winning sides of 1921 and 1922.

== Death ==
Christopher McKivat died on 4 May 1941 after a short illness at the age of 60. He died at Gloucester House, Royal Prince Alfred Hospital, Camperdown. He was survived by his wife and one son. A large funeral took place at St. James Church, Forest Lodge, New South Wales, and he was buried at Botany Cemetery.

== Accolades ==
The Heads/Middleton reference describes him as quiet, good humoured man off the football field, always immaculately dressed and often puffing on a cigar but a lesson in contrasts on the field – voluble, hard-driving and relentlessly barking orders. The Sydney Morning Herald wrote, "he was described by rugby and rugby league authorities as the 'best' halfback of all time. No one possessed better all round ability. His service from the scrum was the speediest of any halfback since the coming of district football."

In 2005, McKivat was admitted into the Australian Rugby League Hall of Fame. In August 2006 he was named as coach of the North Sydney Bears' Team of the Century. In February 2008, McKivat was named in the list of Australia's 100 Greatest Players (1908–2007) which was commissioned by the NRL and ARL to celebrate the code's centenary year in Australia.

== See also ==
- Rugby union at the 1908 Summer Olympics

== Footnotes ==
Sporting positions
Preceded by Bill Heidke	Captain Australia; 1911–1912	Succeeded by Sid Deane
Preceded by Herbert Moran	Captain Australia; 1909	Succeeded by Sydney Middleton
