= Bill Spence (rugby league) =

Australian rugby league footballer

Personal information
- Full name: William Eden Spence
- Born: 17 March 1882 Sydney, New South Wales, Australia
- Died: 28 July 1948 (aged 66) Sydney, New South Wales, Australia

Playing information
- Position: Second-row, Lock, Prop
Club
Years	Team	Pld	T	G	FG	P
1910–14	South Sydney	56	10	2	0	34
Representative
Years	Team	Pld	T	G	FG	P
1910	Australia	1	0	0	0	0
1910–12	New South Wales	6	4	0	0	12
1911–12	Metropolis	3	0	0	0	0
- Source: As of 2 May 2019

Bill Spence (1882-1948) was an Australian professional rugby league footballer who played in the 1910s. He played for South Sydney in the New South Wales Rugby League (NSWRL) competition.

== Background ==
Spence played rugby union for South Sydney before switching codes to play rugby league in 1910.

== Playing career ==
Spence made his first grade debut for Souths against Balmain in Round 1 1910. At the end of the 1910 season, Souths reached the NSWRL grand final against Newtown looking to be the first team to win 3 premierships in a row. Spence played in the match as Souths held a 4-2 lead late in the game. In the dying minutes of the match, Howard Hallett kicked the ball from the near the Souths goal line and Newtown player Albert Hawkes caught the ball on the full near the halfway line and on the touch line. The rules allowed Newtown to claim a fair mark which meant they had the chance to tie the game with a shot at goal. Newtown converted the penalty drawing the game but since they had finished first on the table during the regular season, they were declared premiership winners.

Spence was also selected to play for Australia in 1910 and featured in one test against England. Between 1910 and 1912, Spence was selected to play for New South Wales and Metropolis which was the earlier version of the current day NSW City team. In 1914, Spence played 12 games as Souths won the premiership after losing only 2 games for the entire season. Spence retired from rugby league following the premiership victory. In total, Spence played 63 times for Souths across all grades. He died on 28 July 1948.
