= 1908–09 Northern Rugby Football Union season =

- League: Championship
- Teams: 31

1908–09 Season
- Champions: Wigan (1st title)
- League Leaders: Wigan
- Runners-up: Oldham
- Joined League: Aberdare; Barry; Mid-Rhondda; Treherbert
- Top point-scorer: (England) James Lomas ( Salford) (272)
- Top try-scorer(s): (England) Joe Miller ( Wigan) (Wales) William Williams ( Halifax) (44)

The 1908–09 Northern Rugby Football Union season was the 14th season of rugby league football in the United Kingdom.

The governing body, the Northern Union (NU) decided to admit four extra clubs, all from Wales; Aberdare, Barry, Mid-Rhondda and Treherbert, to expand the Northern Rugby League to 31 clubs. With six Welsh clubs in the league the NU also established a Welsh League along the same lines as the existing Lancashire and Yorkshire leagues.

Wigan won their first Championship this season beating Oldham 7–3 in the play-off final. Wigan also ended the regular season as the league leaders. Oldham's appearance in the Championship final was the first time that a team from outside the top two in the league had reached the final.

Wigan won the Lancashire League. Halifax won the Yorkshire League. The Welsh League was won by Ebbw Vale.

== Northern Rugby League ==
The organisation of the Northern Rugby League, the senior competition for the clubs of the Northern Union, did not involve all the clubs playing all the others. The requirement was that clubs would play all the others from their own league (Yorkshire, Lancashire or Wales) home and away. In addition, at least four fixtures against clubs from other leagues also had to be played, any over this minimum were voluntary. This system meant that clubs played differing numbers of games and therefore the league table was based on win percentage (Win percentage was calculated by adding twice the number of wins to the number of draws and dividing this total by the number of games played to give a percentage between 0 and 100%). This fixture system meant a minimum of 28 games for the Yorkshire clubs and 26 for the Lancashire clubs. The Welsh clubs undertook to play eight games against the other Welsh teams and then an equal number of additional matches against English clubs, a minimum of 16 games.

The Welsh clubs had mixed fortunes, Merthyr Tydfil and Ebbw Vale, for whom this was the second season in the league, finished 8th (18 matches) and 14th (24 matches) respectively. The four new teams, Mid-Rhondda, Treherbert, Barry and Aberdare all finished in the bottom eight finishing 24th (18 matches), 28th (18 matches), 29th (18 matches) and 31st (17 matches) respectively. Aberdare failed to fulfil their last Northern league fixture, away at Wakefield. The disappointing results and the attendant lack of income and support made 1908–09 the only season in the Northern Union for three of thee Welsh teams, as Mid-Rhondda, Aberdare and Barry either left or were expelled from the Northern Union at the end of the season.

The joint top try-scorers were Joe Miller of Wigan and William Williams of Halifax with 49 each. James Lomas of Salford was the season's top scorer with 272 points (88 goals and 32 tries), Lomas's 88 goals also made him the leading goal scorer.

Northern Rugby League final table
| Pos | Team | Pld | W | D | L | PF | PA | Pts | Pct | Qualification |
|---|---|---|---|---|---|---|---|---|---|---|
| 1 | Wigan | 32 | 28 | 0 | 4 | 706 | 207 | 56 | 87.50 | Play-off semi-finals |
| 2 | Halifax | 34 | 28 | 1 | 5 | 526 | 174 | 57 | 83.82 | Play-off semi-finals |
| 3 | Oldham | 32 | 26 | 0 | 6 | 488 | 176 | 52 | 81.25 | Play-off semi-finals |
| 4 | Batley | 32 | 23 | 3 | 6 | 412 | 176 | 49 | 76.56 | Play-off semi-finals |
| 5 | Huddersfield | 34 | 21 | 3 | 10 | 504 | 292 | 45 | 66.17 | |
| 6 | Wakefield Trinity | 31 | 20 | 1 | 10 | 471 | 318 | 41 | 66.12 | |
| 7 | Salford | 32 | 20 | 1 | 11 | 455 | 309 | 41 | 64.06 | |
| 8 | Merthyr Tydfil | 18 | 11 | 1 | 6 | 184 | 156 | 23 | 63.88 | |
| 9 | Broughton Rangers | 32 | 19 | 1 | 12 | 420 | 330 | 39 | 60.93 | |
| 10 | Warrington | 32 | 18 | 2 | 12 | 473 | 266 | 38 | 59.37 | |
| 11 | Runcorn | 28 | 16 | 1 | 11 | 271 | 191 | 33 | 58.92 | |
| 12 | Hunslet | 32 | 18 | 1 | 13 | 361 | 299 | 37 | 57.81 | |
| 13 | Hull | 34 | 19 | 1 | 14 | 487 | 366 | 39 | 57.35 | |
| 14 | Ebbw Vale | 24 | 12 | 1 | 11 | 249 | 269 | 25 | 52.08 | |
| 15 | Leeds | 32 | 15 | 1 | 16 | 398 | 355 | 31 | 48.43 | |
| 16 | Hull Kingston Rovers | 32 | 14 | 1 | 17 | 429 | 423 | 29 | 45.31 | |
| 17 | St. Helens | 28 | 11 | 3 | 14 | 312 | 421 | 25 | 44.64 | |
| 18 | York | 32 | 13 | 1 | 18 | 394 | 510 | 27 | 42.18 | |
| 19 | Dewsbury | 30 | 12 | 1 | 17 | 350 | 324 | 25 | 41.66 | |
| 20 | Keighley | 30 | 12 | 1 | 17 | 338 | 355 | 25 | 41.66 | |
| 21 | Leigh | 28 | 11 | 0 | 17 | 214 | 308 | 22 | 39.28 | |
| 22 | Swinton | 32 | 11 | 1 | 20 | 258 | 440 | 23 | 35.93 | |
| 23 | Bradford Northern | 32 | 11 | 0 | 21 | 324 | 451 | 22 | 34.37 | |
| 24 | Mid-Rhondda | 18 | 5 | 1 | 12 | 111 | 214 | 11 | 30.55 | |
| 25 | Rochdale Hornets | 30 | 8 | 2 | 20 | 195 | 384 | 18 | 30.00 | |
| 26 | Barrow | 32 | 9 | 1 | 22 | 245 | 507 | 19 | 29.69 | |
| 27 | Widnes | 28 | 6 | 3 | 19 | 197 | 359 | 15 | 26.78 | |
| 28 | Treherbert | 18 | 4 | 1 | 13 | 81 | 212 | 9 | 25.00 | |
| 29 | Barry | 18 | 3 | 0 | 15 | 76 | 445 | 6 | 16.66 | |
| 30 | Bramley | 26 | 3 | 0 | 23 | 162 | 582 | 6 | 11.53 | |
| 31 | Aberdare | 17 | 1 | 0 | 16 | 134 | 406 | 2 | 5.88 | |

=== Play-offs ===
Semi-finals
1 | Wigan | 18
4 | Batley | 2
2 | Halifax | 3(2)
3 | Oldham | 3(8)

Championship final
Wigan | 7
Oldham | 3

==== Semi-finals ====
The semi-finals were played on 17 April 1909, Wigan beat Batley 18–2 while Halifax and Oldham drew 3–3. Oldham replayed Halifax on 21 April winning 8–2.

==== Final ====
Northern Rugby League Championship Final

1 May 1909

| Wigan | 7 – 3 | Oldham |
|---|---|---|
| Tries: Ramsdale; Goals: Leytham (2) | Report | Tries: Jardine |

The Willows
Attendance: 12,000
Referee: J. C. Lumley (Leeds)

The Championship final was played on a rainy afternoon of 1 May 1909 before a crowd of around 12,000 at The Willows in Salford. In the third minute, Wigan took the lead through a penalty goal by Jim Leytham. Oldham however scored the first try when Bill Jardine crossed in the fifteenth minute. Wigan's Dick Ramsdale took his side back into the lead with a try in the thirtieth minute. Leytham converted to give Wigan a 7–3 lead at half time. No further points were scored during the match. Contemporary observers considered the match to have been a disappointing spectacle.

Championship Final teams
| Wigan | Number | Oldham |
Fullback
| Jim Sharrock | 1 | Alf Wood |
Threequarter backs
| Jim Leytham | 2 | George Tyson |
| Bert Jenkins | 3 | Sid Deane |
| Lance Todd | 4 | Tom Llewellyn |
| Joe Miller | 5 | George Smith |
Halfbacks
| Johnny Thomas | 6 | Billy Dixon |
| Ned Jones | 7 | Arthur Anlezark |
Forwards
| Jack Barton | 8 | Bert Avery |
| Walter Cheetham | 9 | Joe Ferguson |
| Howell de Francis | 10 | Bill Jardine |
| Dick Ramsdale | 11 | Joe Owens |
| Dick Silcock | 12 | Arthur Smith |
| Tom Whittaker | 13 | Harry Topham |

=== County leagues ===
The Yorkshire and Lancashire county leagues had been re-established the previous season. Team results from championship games played against clubs from the same county counted towards the county league. Halifax won the Yorkshire league and Wigan the Lancashire league.

Yorkshire League
| Pos | Team | Pld | W | D | L | PF | PA | Pts |
|---|---|---|---|---|---|---|---|---|
| 1 | Halifax | 24 | 21 | 1 | 2 | 373 | 112 | 43 |
| 2 | Batley | 24 | 17 | 3 | 4 | 275 | 132 | 37 |
| 3 | Wakefield Trinity | 24 | 16 | 1 | 7 | 396 | 236 | 33 |
| 4 | Hunslet | 24 | 15 | 1 | 8 | 291 | 213 | 31 |
| 5 | Huddersfield | 24 | 14 | 2 | 8 | 328 | 211 | 30 |
| 6 | Hull | 24 | 12 | 1 | 11 | 353 | 270 | 25 |
| 7 | Hull Kingston Rovers | 24 | 10 | 1 | 13 | 321 | 348 | 21 |
| 8 | Leeds | 24 | 10 | 1 | 13 | 264 | 295 | 21 |
| 9 | Keighley | 24 | 9 | 1 | 14 | 249 | 300 | 19 |
| 10 | Dewsbury | 24 | 8 | 1 | 15 | 247 | 269 | 17 |
| 11 | York | 24 | 8 | 1 | 15 | 246 | 384 | 17 |
| 12 | Bradford Northern | 24 | 6 | 0 | 18 | 180 | 359 | 12 |
| 13 | Bramley | 24 | 3 | 0 | 21 | 147 | 541 | 6 |

Lancashire League
| Pos | Team | Pld | W | D | L | PF | PA | Pts |
|---|---|---|---|---|---|---|---|---|
| 1 | Wigan | 22 | 19 | 0 | 3 | 424 | 145 | 38 |
| 2 | Oldham | 22 | 18 | 0 | 4 | 310 | 130 | 36 |
| 3 | Salford | 22 | 14 | 1 | 7 | 297 | 206 | 28 |
| 4 | Broughton Rangers | 22 | 13 | 1 | 8 | 319 | 233 | 27 |
| 5 | Warrington | 22 | 12 | 1 | 9 | 345 | 190 | 25 |
| 6 | Runcorn | 22 | 11 | 1 | 10 | 189 | 167 | 23 |
| 7 | Swinton | 22 | 8 | 1 | 13 | 164 | 255 | 17 |
| 8 | St Helens | 22 | 7 | 3 | 12 | 173 | 321 | 17 |
| 9 | Leigh | 22 | 8 | 0 | 14 | 168 | 253 | 16 |
| 10 | Rochdale Hornets | 22 | 6 | 2 | 14 | 145 | 257 | 14 |
| 11 | Widnes | 22 | 4 | 3 | 15 | 123 | 255 | 11 |
| 12 | Barrow | 22 | 5 | 1 | 16 | 117 | 362 | 11 |

=== Bribery case ===
In November 1908, Edward Crofton, a Wigan coal dealer, was jailed for two months with hard labour for attempting to bribe two Wigan players, Lance Todd and Massa Johnston, to throw the club's game against Hunslet. The prosecution case was that, in September, Crofton had waited in a Wigan pub for the two players to come in and when they did arrive, he offered them £5 each and a share of the winnings from betting on Hunslet to beat Wigan the following Saturday. The two players did not take the suggestion seriously, thinking it was a joke, and left the pub. The following evening, the players were again in the pub and Crofton repeated the offer, increasing the amount offered to each player to £20. Again the players thought it was a joke but reported the matter to the club. The defendant maintained that the first meeting never took place and that the second occasion was simply a joke remark on his part and that he had never actually offered either player any money. As another Wigan player had testified that Crofton had been in the pub on the first occasion, the magistrates did not believe Crofton and unanimously convicted him of the offence.

== Welsh league ==
The Welsh league was new for this season and worked on different principles from the county leagues. Instead of games between Welsh teams scoring for both the Northern league and the Welsh league, separate fixtures were played for each league resulting in each club's fixture list including four fixtures against each of the other Welsh clubs (two in the Northern league and two in the Welsh league). Not all the Welsh league matches were played as some of the clubs got into financial difficulties. Ebbw Vale won the Welsh league when they won their game against Mid-Rhondda at the beginning of April. Ebbw Vale beat a Rest of Welsh League side 20–0 in a season finale.

Welsh League
| Pos | Team | Pld | W | D | L | PF | PA | Pct |
|---|---|---|---|---|---|---|---|---|
| 1 | Ebbw Vale | 8 | 7 | 0 | 1 | 135 | 21 | 87.50% |
| 2 | Treherbert | 8 | 4 | 1 | 3 | 64 | 105 | 56.25% |
| 3 | Mid-Rhondda | 9 | 5 | 0 | 4 | 70 | 48 | 55.55% |
| 4 | Merthyr Tydfil | 10 | 5 | 0 | 5 | 101 | 73 | 50.00% |
| 5 | Barry | 6 | 1 | 1 | 4 | 20 | 102 | 25.00% |
| 6 | Aberdare | 7 | 1 | 0 | 6 | 64 | 108 | 14.28% |

== Challenge Cup ==
Wakefield Trinity beat Hull F.C. 17–0 in the final at Headingley, Leeds on 24 April 1909 to win their first Cup in their first final. This was Hull's second successive defeat in a Challenge Cup final, having failed to score a point in either final.

== County Cups ==
Halifax won the Yorkshire Cup beating Hunslet 9–5 in the final. Wigan won the Lancashire Cup beating Oldham 10–9 in the final.

== International tour ==
The Australia national rugby league team toured the United Kingdom and during the tour played all the Northern Union clubs except Bramley and Barry.
