= 1912–13 Northern Rugby Football Union season =

- League: Championship
- Teams: 26

1912–13 Season
- Champions: Huddersfield (2nd title)
- League Leaders: Huddersfield
- Runners-up: Wigan
- Top point-scorer: (Wales) Johnny Thomas ( Wigan) (198)
- Top try-scorer: (Australia) Albert Rosenfeld ( Huddersfield) (80)
- Resigned from the League: Ebbw Vale

The 1912–13 Northern Rugby Football Union season was the 18th season of rugby league football.

== Season summary ==
Huddersfield ended the regular season as league leaders and then defeated Wigan 29-2 in the play-off final to win their second Championship in as many seasons.

The Challenge Cup Winners were Huddersfield who defeated Warrington 9-5.

Ebbw Vale dropped out.

Matches between Wakefield Trinity and Coventry, and Bramley and York were cancelled.

Huddersfield's Australian stand-off Albert Rosenfeld broke his own record of 76 tries in a season which he set last year by scoring 80 this season.

Wigan won the Lancashire League, and Huddersfield won the Yorkshire League. Wigan beat Rochdale Hornets 21–5 to win the Lancashire Cup, and Batley beat Hull F.C. to win the Yorkshire County Cup.

== Championship ==
	Team	Pld	W	D	L	PF	PA	Pts	Pct
1	Huddersfield	32	28	0	4	732	217	56	87.5
2	Wigan	34	28	0	6	702	249	56	82.35
3	Hull Kingston Rovers	32	23	1	8	469	273	47	73.43
4	Dewsbury	34	23	1	10	534	230	47	69.11
5	Hunslet	34	22	2	10	468	252	46	67.66
6	Broughton Rangers	30	17	4	9	303	173	38	63.33
7	Salford	30	19	0	11	245	182	38	63.33
8	Wakefield Trinity	33	20	2	11	348	350	42	63.33
9	Batley	32	18	1	13	379	218	37	57.81
10	Leeds	34	19	1	14	497	281	39	57.36
11	Oldham	32	17	2	13	341	273	36	56.24
12	Rochdale Hornets	34	17	2	15	327	277	36	52.94
13	Hull	34	16	3	15	318	328	35	51.47
14	Widnes	32	15	2	15	333	319	32	50
15	Swinton	32	15	1	16	248	256	31	48.44
16	St. Helens	32	14	1	17	370	331	29	45.31
17	Bradford Northern	34	14	2	18	253	336	30	44.12
18	Warrington	32	13	2	17	214	278	28	43.75
19	Runcorn	30	11	0	19	209	347	22	36.66
20	York	29	10	0	19	256	465	20	34.48
21	Halifax	32	10	2	20	269	367	22	34.38
22	Barrow	30	9	2	19	235	351	20	33.33
23	Leigh	30	8	0	22	153	321	16	26.67
24	Keighley	28	4	3	21	143	419	11	19.64
25	Bramley	31	4	1	26	172	686	9	14.52
26	Coventry	27	0	1	26	157	896	1	1.85

== Championship play-off ==
Semi-finals
1	Huddersfield	30
4	Dewsbury	3
2	Wigan	16
3	Hull Kingston Rovers	3

Championship final
Huddersfield	29
Wigan	2

Huddersfield's Douglas Clark scored a hat-trick of tries in his side's victory in the Championship final.

== Challenge Cup ==
Huddersfield defeated Warrington 9-5 at Leeds in front of a crowd of 22,754.

This was Hudderfield’s first Challenge Cup win in their first Final appearance.

== Sources ==
- 1912-13 Rugby Football League season at wigan.rlfans.com
- The Challenge Cup at The Rugby Football League website
