= Australasia rugby league team =

Australasia
Team information
- Nickname: The Kangaroos
- Governing body: New South Wales Rugby League
- Region: Oceania

Team results
- First international
- Australasia 13–13 Great Britain (Sydney, Australia; 9 July 1910)
- Biggest win
- Australasia 33–8 Great Britain (Birmingham, England; 1 January 1912)
- Biggest defeat
- Australasia 0–6 Great Britain (Salford, England; 13 January 1922)

The Australasian rugby league team represented Australia and New Zealand in rugby league sporadically between 1910 and 1922. Administered by the New South Wales Rugby League, appearances for the team were counted towards the Australian team's records and playing register but not the New Zealand team's. The team toured Great Britain twice, participating in two Ashes series, and also played Great Britain twice in Sydney.

== 1910 ==
The Australasian side first played in 1910. After Great Britain had defeated Australia in two Test matches it was decided that two games would be played between Australasia and Great Britain. The team played in the Australian jersey's sky blue with maroon hoops, with the addition of black hoops to represent New Zealand.

9 July

Australasia	13–13	Great Britain
Tries: V Farnsworth, E Courtney, C McKivatt; Goals: H Messenger (2)		Tries: J Leytham, A Avery, B Winstanley; Goals: J Lomas, J Thomas

Royal Agricultural Society Showground, Sydney
Attendance: 45,000
Referee: Tom McMahon Sr.

13 July

Australasia	32–15	Great Britain
Tries: Farnsworth, H Messenger, H Brackenrigg, B Spence; Goals: H Messenger (5), H Brackenrigg (3), C McKivat (2)		Tries: Riley (2), B Winstanley; Goals: J Thomas (3)

Wentworth Park, Sydney
Attendance: 15,000

== 1911–12 ==
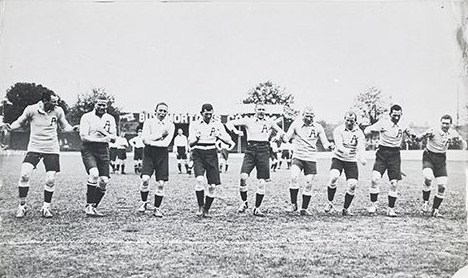
The 1911 Kangaroos performing their war cry before the first Test.

Following individual tours by New Zealand and Australia in 1907–08 and 1908–09 respectively, the Northern Rugby Football Union invited an 'Australasian' team to tour Great Britain during the 1911–12 season. They became the first tourists to win the Ashes.

Prior to the tour a three-way series of matches between New South Wales, Queensland and New Zealand was organised as a basis of selection for the tour. The New South Welshmen dominated the touring side, with four New Zealanders and only one Queenslander selected. However, counted amongst the New South Welshmen was Con Sullivan, who had moved to Australia from New Zealand a few years before.

- 7 October 1911 win v Wales, 28–20 at Ebbw Vale, Wales (7,000)
- 18 October 1911 win v England, 11–6 at Fulham, England (6,000)

8 November 1911

Australasia	19–10	Great Britain
Tries: V. Farnsworth (2); Hallett; Goals:		Tries: Goals:

St James' Park, Newcastle England
Attendance: 5,317

- 6 December 1911 loss v England, 3–5 at Nottingham (3,000)

16 December 1911

Australasia	11–11	Great Britain

Tynecastle Stadium, Edinburgh Scotland
Attendance: 8,000

1 January 1912

Australasia	33–8	Great Britain

Villa Park, Birmingham England
Attendance: 4,000

== 1921–22 ==
The 1921 Kangaroos.

The Australasian Kangaroos again toured Great Britain during the 1921–1922 season.

During 1921 the New Zealand side toured Australia, playing matches against New South Wales and Queensland, which served as selection trials for the upcoming 'Australasian' team's tour, for which only one New Zealander, Bert Laing, selected. The team wore the sky blue jersey of New South Wales and the only non-New South Welsh player to appear in a test was Queenslander Billy Richards in the third.

1 October 1921

Great Britain	6–5	Australasia
Tries: S Stockwell 1 B Stone 1		Tries: C Blinkhorn 1 Goals: J Craig 1

Headingley, Leeds
Attendance: 31,700
Referee: Frank Renton

October 1921	England	5–4	Australasia	London, England
	Tries: 1 Goals: 1		Goals: 2	Stadium: Highbury; Attendance: 12,000

5 November 1921

Great Britain	2–16	Australasia
Goals: J Rogers 1		Tries: C Blinkhorn 2 H Horder 1 D Vest 1 Goals: D Thompson 2

The Boulevard, Hull
Attendance: 21,504
Referee: R Robinson

December 1921	Wales	16–21	Australasia	Pontypridd, Wales
	Tries: 2 Goals: 5		Tries: 5 Goals: 3	Attendance: 13,000

14 January 1922

Great Britain	6–0	Australasia
Tries: H Hilton 1 F Gallagher 1

Weaste Ground, Salford
Attendance: 22,000
