= 1910–11 Northern Rugby Football Union season =

- League: Championship
- Teams: 28
- Champions: Oldham (3rd title)
- League Leaders: Wigan
- Runners-up: Wigan
- Top point-scorer(s): (England) Alf Carmichael ( Hull Kingston Rovers) (261)
- Top try-scorer(s): (England) William Kitchin ( Huddersfield) (41)
- Joined League: Coventry
- Resigned from the League: Treherbert

The 1910–11 Northern Rugby Football Union season was the 16th season of rugby league football.

== Season summary ==
Oldham won their third Championship, and second in a row, after defeating Wigan 20-7 in the Play Off Final. Wigan had ended the regular season in the top position, but only after it had been decided by a one-off play-off with Oldham that Wigan won 11-3.

The Challenge Cup winners were Broughton Rangers who defeated Wigan 4-0.

Coventry replaced Treherbert.

Wigan won the Lancashire League, and Wakefield Trinity won the Yorkshire League. Oldham beat Swinton 4–3 to win the Lancashire Cup, and Wakefield Trinity beat Huddersfield 8–2 to win the Yorkshire County Cup.

== Championship ==
	Team	Pld	W	D	L	PF	PA	Pts	Pct
1	Wigan	34	28	1	5	650	205	57	83.82
2	Oldham	34	28	1	5	441	210	57	83.82
3	Wakefield Trinity	33	24	1	8	493	264	49	74.24
4	Widnes	30	19	3	8	310	137	41	68.33
5	Hull Kingston Rovers	33	21	3	9	587	294	45	68.18
6	Hunslet	34	21	0	13	431	389	42	61.76
7	Huddersfield	36	22	0	14	702	293	44	61.11
8	Hull	36	20	3	13	453	347	43	59.72
9	Warrington	31	15	5	11	284	303	35	56.45
10	Dewsbury	30	16	0	14	284	333	32	53.33
11	Swinton	34	18	0	16	333	262	36	52.94
12	Leeds	33	16	2	15	385	340	34	51.51
13	Rochdale Hornets	34	17	1	16	355	320	35	51.47
14	Halifax	36	18	1	17	371	328	37	51.38
15	Keighley	29	14	1	14	246	447	29	50
16	Salford	32	14	2	16	335	337	30	46.87
17	Batley	31	14	1	16	272	223	29	46.77
18	Broughton Rangers	32	14	1	17	208	338	29	45.31
19	St. Helens	34	14	1	19	377	449	29	42.64
20	Leigh	32	13	0	19	219	355	26	40.63
21	Barrow	32	11	1	20	272	395	23	35.94
22	Runcorn	30	9	3	18	230	331	21	35
23	Bradford Northern	32	10	1	21	173	390	21	32.81
24	York	30	9	0	21	273	423	18	30
25	Ebbw Vale	30	9	0	21	178	297	18	30
26	Merthyr Tydfil	18	5	0	13	90	335	10	27.77
27	Coventry	32	6	1	25	288	524	13	20.31
28	Bramley	32	5	1	26	150	521	11	17.18

== Championship play-off ==
Semi-finals
1	Wigan	16
4	Widnes	0
2	Oldham	15
3	Wakefield Trinity	12

Championship final
Wigan	7
Oldham	20

== Challenge Cup ==
Broughton Rangers defeated Wigan 4-0 to win their second, and to date, last Challenge Cup.

The scoreline set a record for the lowest winning score and lowest aggregate score in a Challenge Cup Final.

== Sources ==
- 1910-11 Rugby Football League season at wigan.rlfans.com
- The Challenge Cup at The Rugby Football League website
