= Wheater's Field =

Rugby ground in Broughton, England

- Interactive map of Wheater's Field
- Full name: Wheater's Field
- Location: Broughton, Salford, England
- Coordinates: 53.494001°N 2.265213°W
- Capacity: 20,000
- Surface: Grass

Tenant
- Broughton Rangers

Wheater's Field was a rugby ground in Broughton, Salford, England. It was home to the Broughton Rangers rugby league club of the Northern Union. On 19 October 1907, the stadium hosted a match between Rangers and the New Zealand All Golds. It had a capacity of 20,000. Rangers would call the stadium home until just before the First World War when they moved to the nearby Cliff.

The ground hosted two Challenge Cup finals, in 1907 Warrington 17 Oldham 3 and in 1921 Leigh 13 Halifax 0.

Wheater's Field is now a housing estate and its location is traceable through the naming of three streets: Wheater's Crescent, Wheater's Street and Wheater's Terrace.

Preceded by Headingley; Leeds	Challenge Cup; Final Venue; 1906-07	Succeeded by Fartown; Huddersfield
Preceded by Headingley; Leeds	Challenge Cup; Final Venue; 1920-21	Succeeded by Headingley; Leeds
