= 1923–24 Yorkshire Cup =

- Structure: Regional knockout championship
- Teams: 16
- Winners: Hull
- Runners-up: Huddersfield

The 1923–24 Yorkshire Cup was the sixteenth occasion on which the Yorkshire Cup competition had been held. This year, for the fourth consecutive year, produced another new name was inscribed on the trophy. Hull F.C. (previously three times beaten finalists) won the trophy by beating Huddersfield by the score of 10–4 in the final. The match was played at Headingley, Leeds, now in West Yorkshire. The attendance was 23,300 and receipts were £1,728.

== Background ==
The Rugby Football League's Yorkshire Cup competition was a knock-out competition between (mainly professional) rugby league clubs from the county of Yorkshire. The actual area was at times increased to encompass other teams from outside the county such as Newcastle, Mansfield, Coventry, and even London (in the form of Acton & Willesden. The Rugby League season always (until the onset of "Summer Rugby" in 1996) ran from around August-time through to around May-time and this competition always took place early in the season, in the Autumn, with the final taking place in (or just before) December (The only exception to this was when disruption of the fixture list was caused during, and immediately after, the two World Wars).

== Competition and results ==
This season there were again two junior/amateur clubs taking part, Elland Wanderers again, and Castleford. The number of entries remained at last year's "full house" total of sixteen again obviating the necessity of having byes.

=== Round 1 ===
Involved 8 matches (with no byes) and 16 clubs

Game No	Fixture date	Home team	Score	Away team	Venue	Ref
1	Sat 13 Oct 1923	Castleford (Note: Castleford were at that time a junior club. They joined the league for season 1926–27)	3–17	Batley	Sandy Desert	
2	Sat 13 Oct 1923	Dewsbury	13–5	Leeds	Crown Flatt	
3	Sat 13 Oct 1923	Elland Wanderers (Note: Elland Wanderers were a Junior/amateur club from Elland (Halifax))	2–53	Huddersfield	venue unknown	
4	Sat 13 Oct 1923	Featherstone Rovers	6–15	Hull Kingston Rovers	Post Office Road	
5	Sat 13 Oct 1923	Halifax	27–0	Bradford Northern	Thrum Hall	
6	Sat 13 Oct 1923	Hull	16–3	Bramley	Boulevard	
7	Sat 13 Oct 1923	Keighley	5–3	York	Lawkholme Lane	
8	Sat 13 Oct 1923	Wakefield Trinity	4–13	Hunslet	Belle Vue	

=== Round 2 – quarterfinals ===
Involved 4 matches and 8 clubs

Game No	Fixture date	Home team	Score	Away team	Venue	Ref
1	Sat 27 Oct 1923	Huddersfield	19–2	Halifax	Fartown	
2	Sat 27 Oct 1923	Hull	16–7	Hunslet	Boulevard	
3	Sat 27 Oct 1923	Hull Kingston Rovers	7–16	Batley	Craven Park (1)	
4	Sat 27 Oct 1923	Keighley	6–8	Dewsbury	Lawkholme Lane	

=== Round 3 – semifinals ===
Involved 2 matches and 4 clubs

Game No	Fixture date	Home team	Score	Away team	Venue	Ref
1	Sat 10 Nov 1923	Dewsbury	3–12	Hull	Crown Flatt	
2	Sat 10 Nov 1923	Huddersfield	10–9	Batley	Fartown	

=== Final ===
Game No	Fixture date	Home team	Score	Away team	Venue	Att	Rec	Ref
	Saturday 24 November 1923	Hull	10–4	Huddersfield	Headingley (Note: Headingley is the home ground of Leeds RLFC with a capacity of 21,000. The record attendance was 40,175 for a league match between Leeds and Bradford Northern on 21 May 1947.)	23,300	£1,728	

==== Teams and scorers ====
Hull	№	Huddersfield
	Teams	
Ned Rogers	1	Joe Oliver
Billy Stone	2	Stanley Thorpe
Tom Collins	3	Joseph McTighe
Billy Batten	4	Harold Wagstaff
Jim Kennedy	5	Johnny Rogers
Stan Whitty	6	James May
Eddie Caswell	7	Harold Edmondson
Jack Beasty	8	Arthur Sherwood
Bill Brennan	9	Ben Gronow
Harold Bowman	10	Thomas Fenwick
Bob Taylor	11	Douglas Clark
Edgar Morgan	12	George Naylor
Harold Garrett	13	Tommy Schofield
??	Coach	??
10	score	4
3	HT	4
	Scorers	
	Tries	
	T	
	T	
	Goals	
	G	Ben Gronow (1)
	G	Joe Oliver (1)
	G	
	Drop Goals	
	DG	
	DG	
Referee		unknown

Scoring - Try = three (3) points - Goal = two (2) points - Drop goal = two (2) points

=== The road to success ===
First round
Keighley	5
York	3
Dewsbury	13
Leeds	6
Hull	16
Bramley	3
Wakefield Trinity	4
Hunslet	13
Elland Wanderers	2
Huddersfield	53
Halifax	27
Bradford Northern	0
Featherstone Rovers	6
Hull Kingston Rovers	15
Castleford	3
Batley	17

Second round
Keighley	6
Dewsbury	8
Hull	16
Hunslet	7
Huddersfield	19
Halifax	2
Hull Kingston Rovers	7
Batley	16

Semifinals
Dewsbury	3
Hull	12
Huddersfield	10
Batley	9

Final
Hull	10
Huddersfield	4

== See also ==
- 1923–24 Northern Rugby Football League season
- Rugby league county cups
