= 1912–13 Yorkshire Cup =

- Structure: Regional knockout championship
- Teams: 13
- Winners: Batley
- Runners-up: Hull

The 1912–13 Yorkshire Cup was the eighth occasion on which the Yorkshire Cup competition, a Rugby league tournament, was held. This year's tournament saw a new name on the trophy, Batley winning the trophy by beating Hull F.C. by the score of 17-3

The match was played at Headingley, Leeds, now in West Yorkshire. The attendance was 16,000 and receipts were £523

This was the only time between 1909–10 and 1919-20 inclusive that Huddersfield would not contest the final. During this period the club made seven appearances out of the eight occasions winning six times (which included four consecutive times between 1913–14 and 1919–20.)

== Background ==
This season there were no junior/amateur clubs taking part, no new entrants and no "leavers" and so the total of entries remained the same at thirteen.

This in turn resulted in three byes in the first round.

== Competition and Results ==
=== Round 1 ===
Involved 5 matches (with three byes) and 13 clubs

Game No	Fixture date	Home team	Score	Away team	Venue	Ref
1	Sat 12 Oct 1912	Batley	15-12	Wakefield Trinity	Mount Pleasant	
2	Sat 12 Oct 1912	Hull	7-5	Dewsbury	Boulevard	
3	Sat 12 Oct 1912	Hull Kingston Rovers	11-3	Huddersfield	Craven Street (off Holderness Road)	
4	Sat 12 Oct 1912	Keighley	5-5	Bradford Northern	Lawkholme Lane	
5	Sat 12 Oct 1912	Leeds	19-8	Bramley	Headingley	
6		Halifax		bye		
7		Hunslet		bye		
8		York		bye		

=== Round 1 - Replays ===
Involved 1 match and 2 clubs

Game No	Fixture date	Home team	Score	Away team	Venue	Ref
R	Wed 16 Oct 1912	Bradford Northern	5-0	Keighley	Birch Lane	

=== Round 2 – quarterfinals ===
Involved 4 matches and 8 clubs

Game No	Fixture date	Home team	Score	Away team	Venue	Ref
1	Sat 26 Oct 1912	Batley	21-2	York	Mount Pleasant	
2	Sat 26 Oct 1912	Bradford Northern	2-3	Hunslet	Birch Lane	
3	Sat 26 Oct 1912	Hull	15-0	Halifax	Boulevard	
4	Wed 30 Oct 1912	Leeds	11-10	Hull Kingston Rovers	Headingley	

=== Round 3 – semifinals ===
Involved 2 matches and 4 clubs

Game No	Fixture date	Home team	Score	Away team	Venue	Ref
1	Sat 9 Nov 1912	Batley	18-2	Leeds	Mount Pleasant	
2	Sat 9 Nov 1912	Hull	8-6	Hunslet	Boulevard	

=== Final ===
Game No	Fixture date	Home team	Score	Away team	Venue	Att	Rec	Ref
	Saturday 23 November 1912	Batley	17-3	Hull	Headingley (Note: Headingley is the home ground of Leeds RLFC with a capacity of 21,000. The record attendance was 40,175 for a league match between Leeds and Bradford Northern on 21 May 1947)	16000	523	

==== Teams and scorers ====
Batley	№	Hull
	teams	
Jimmy Lyons	1	Ellis Clarkson
Eddie Ward	2	Alf Francis
Walter Drummond	3	Herb Gilbert
Clem Garforth	4	George Cottrell
Jack Tindall	5	Ned Rogers
Benny Laughlin	6	William Higgins
Jack Brooksby	7	William Anderson
Jack Battersby	8	Tom Herridge
'Billy' Fenton	9	H. Webster
Jim Gath	10	Gus Merry
Fred Hill	11	Steve Darmody
Arthur Kitson (c)	12	Billy Holder
Fred Leek	13	Dick Taylor
Arthur Garner	Coach	Sid Melville (trainer)
17	score	3
4	HT	0
	Scorers	
	Tries	
Jack Tindall (2)	T	
Brooksby (1)	T	
	Goals	
Lyons (2 )	G	
Brooksby (1)	G	
Garforth (1)	G	
Referee		unknown

Scoring - Try = three (3) points - Goal = two (2) points - Drop goal = two (2) points

=== The road to success ===
First round
Batley	15
Wakefield Trinity	12
York
bye
Leeds	19
Bramley	8
Hull Kingston Rovers	11
Huddersfield	3
Hull	7
Dewsbury	5
Halifax
bye
Keighley	5 (0)
Bradford Northern	5 (5)
Hunslet
bye

Second round
Batley	21
York	2
Leeds	11
Hull Kingston Rovers	10
Hull	15
Halifax	0
Bradford Northern	2
Hunslet	3

Semifinals
Batley	18
Leeds	2
Hull	8
Hunslet	6

Final
Batley	17
Hull	3

== See also ==
- 1912–13 Northern Rugby Football Union season
- Rugby league county cups
