= 1919–20 Yorkshire Cup =

- Structure: Regional knockout championship
- Teams: 14
- Winners: Huddersfield
- Runners-up: Leeds

The 1919–20 Yorkshire Cup was the twelfth occasion on which the Yorkshire Cup competition had been held. This season saw the junior/amateur club Featherstone Rovers being invited again, and this, together with the restart-up of Keighley after the wartime close-down, resulted in an increase of one bringing the total entries up to fourteen. This in turn resulted in two byes in the first round.

This year saw the cup holders retain the trophy after winning for the fourth successive time, with Huddersfield winning the trophy by beating Leeds by the score of 24–5 in the final. The match was played at Thrum Hall, Halifax, now in West Yorkshire. The attendance was, 24,935 and receipts were ££2,096. This was Huddersfield's seventh appearance in what had been seven appearances in eight consecutive finals between 1909 and this season (which included four successive victories and six in total), and who knows, but for the intervention of the First World War and suspension of the competition, it may have been more. It was also the fourth consecutive win.

== Background ==
The Rugby Football League's Yorkshire Cup competition was a knock-out competition between (mainly professional) rugby league clubs from the county of Yorkshire. The actual area was at times increased to encompass other teams from outside the county such as Newcastle, Mansfield, Coventry, and even London (in the form of Acton & Willesden. The competition always took place early in the season, in the Autumn, with the final taking place in (or just before) December (The only exception to this was when disruption of the fixture list was caused during, and immediately after, the two World Wars)

== Competition and results ==
=== Round 1 ===
Involved 6 matches (with two byes) and 14 clubs

Game No	Fixture date	Home team	Score	Away team	Venue	Ref
1	Sat 18 Oct 1919	Bradford Northern	3–5	Batley	Birch Lane	
2	Sat 18 Oct 1919	Bramley	18–5	Hull Kingston Rovers	Barley Mow	
3	Sat 18 Oct 1919	Featherstone Rovers (Note: Featherstone Rovers were at the time a junior/amateur club. They eventually joined the League for season 1921–22)	15–4	Keighley	Post Office Road	
4	Sat 18 Oct 1919	Halifax	4–9	Huddersfield	Thrum Hall	
5	Sat 18 Oct 1919	Leeds	8–5	Dewsbury	Headingley	
6	Sat 18 Oct 1919	York	10–5	Hunslet	Clarence Street	
7		Hull		bye		
8		Wakefield Trinity		bye		

=== Round 2 – quarterfinals ===
Involved 4 matches and 8 clubs

Game No	Fixture date	Home team	Score	Away team	Venue	Ref
1	Sat 1 Nov 1919	Batley	12–2	Featherstone Rovers	Mount Pleasant	
2	Sat 1 Nov 1919	Huddersfield	33–8	Hull	Fartown	
3	Sat 1 Nov 1919	Leeds	14–4	Bramley	Headingley	
4	Sat 1 Nov 1919	Wakefield Trinity	4–3	York	Belle Vue	

=== Round 3 – semifinals ===
Involved 2 matches and 4 clubs

Game No	Fixture date	Home team	Score	Away team	Venue	Ref
1	Sat 15 Nov 1919	Huddersfield	15–5	Wakefield Trinity	Fartown	
2	Sat 15 Nov 1919	Leeds	16–5	Batley	Headingley	

=== Final ===
Game No	Fixture date	Home team	Score	Away team	Venue	Att	Rec	Ref
	Saturday 29 November 1919	Huddersfield	24–5	Leeds	Thrum Hall (Note: Thrum Hall was the home ground of Halifax with a final capacity of 9,832 (The attendance record of 29,153 was set on 21 March 1959 for a third round Challenge Cup tie v Wigan). The club finally moved out in 1998 to take part ownership and ground-share with Halifax Town A.F.C. at The Shay Stadium.)	24935	£2,096	

==== Teams and scorers ====
Huddersfield	№	Leeds
	teams	
Major Holland	1	J. H. Roberts
Albert Rosenfeld	2	Jim Bacon
Tom Gleeson	3	William Davies
Harold Wagstaff	4	John Campbell
Stan Moorhouse	5	Squire Stockwell
Johnny Rogers	6	Joe Brittain
Robert Habron	7	A. E. Jenkinson
Aaron Lee	8	F. Mirfield
Arthur Swinden	9	F. Godward
Herbert Sherwood	10	W. N. Whiting
Ben Gronow	11	Billy Ward
G. Naylor	12	Fred Webster
Douglas Clark	13	Fred Carter
??	Coach	??
24	score	5
13	HT	0
	Scorers	
	Tries	
Stan Moorhouse (4)	T	W. N. Whiting (1)
R Habron (1)	T	
Albert "Rozzi" Rosenfeld (1)	T	
	Goals	
Ben Gronow (3)	G	F. Mirfield (1)
	Drop Goals	
	DG	
Referee		B. Ennion (Wigan)

Scoring – Try = three (3) points – Goal = two (2) points – Drop goal = two (2) points

=== The road to success ===
First round
Halifax	4
Huddersfield	9
Hull
bye
Wakefield Trinity
bye
York	10
Hunslet	5
Leeds	8
Dewsbury	5
Bramley	18
Hull Kingston Rovers	5
Bradford Northern	3
Batley	5
Featherstone Rovers	15
Keighley	4

Second round
Huddersfield	33
Hull	8
Wakefield Trinity	4
York	3
Leeds	14
Bramley	4
Batley	12
Featherstone Rovers	2

Semifinals
Huddersfield	15
Wakefield Trinity	5
Leeds	16
Batley	5

Final
Huddersfield	24
Leeds	5

== See also ==
- 1919–20 Northern Rugby Football Union season
- Rugby league county cups
