= 1927–28 Yorkshire Cup =

- Structure: Regional knockout championship
- Teams: 15
- Winners: Dewsbury
- Runners-up: Hull

The 1927–28 Yorkshire Cup tournament was the 20th occasion on which the Yorkshire Cup competition had been held. Dewsbury won the trophy by beating Hull F.C. in the final by the score of 8–2. The match was played at Headingley, Leeds, now in West Yorkshire. The attendance was 21,700 and receipts were £1,466. This was Dewsbury's second triumph in a three-year period having last won the trophy in 1925–26.

== Background ==
The Rugby Football League's Yorkshire Cup competition was a knock-out competition between (mainly professional) rugby league clubs from the county of Yorkshire. The actual area was at times increased to encompass other teams from outside the county such as Newcastle, Mansfield, Coventry, and even London (in the form of Acton & Willesden. The Rugby League season always (until the onset of "Summer Rugby" in 1996) ran from around August-time through to around May-time and this competition always took place early in the season, in the Autumn, with the final taking place in (or just before) December (The only exception to this was when disruption of the fixture list was caused during, and immediately after, the two World Wars).

== Competition and results ==
This season there were no junior/amateur clubs taking part, no new entrants and no "leavers" and so the total of entries remained the same at fifteen. This in turn resulted in one bye in the first round.

=== Round 1 ===
Involved 7 matches (with one bye) and 15 clubs

Game No	Fixture date	Home team	Score	Away team	Venue	Ref
1	Sat 8 Oct 1927	Castleford	22–0	Bramley	Wheldon Road (Note: The first Yorkshire Cup game to be played at Castleford's new stadium)	
2	Sat 8 Oct 1927	Dewsbury	13–9	Huddersfield	Crown Flatt	
3	Sat 8 Oct 1927	Halifax	2–7	Batley	Thrum Hall	
4	Sat 8 Oct 1927	Hull Kingston Rovers	5–5	Keighley	Craven Park (1)	
5	Sat 8 Oct 1927	Leeds	12–2	Featherstone Rovers	Headingley	
6	Sat 8 Oct 1927	Wakefield Trinity	4–12	Hull	Belle Vue	
7	Sat 8 Oct 1927	York	15–2	Bradford Northern	Clarence Street	
8		Hunslet		bye		

=== Round 1 - replays ===
Involved 1 match and 2 clubs

Game No	Fixture date	Home team	Score	Away team	Venue	Ref
R	Tue 11 Oct 1927	Keighley	2–24	Hull Kingston Rovers	Lawkholme Lane	

=== Round 2 – quarterfinals ===
Involved 4 matches and 8 clubs

Game No	Fixture date	Home team	Score	Away team	Venue	Ref
1	Wed 19 Oct 1927	Dewsbury	15–5	Batley	Crown Flatt	
2	Wed 19 Oct 1927	Hull Kingston Rovers	13–2	Hunslet	Craven Park (1)	
3	Wed 19 Oct 1927	York	19–7	Leeds	Clarence Street	
4	Thu 20 Oct 1927	Hull	7–7	Castleford	Boulevard	

=== Round 2 - replays ===
Involved 1 match and 2 clubs

Game No	Fixture date	Home team	Score	Away team	Venue	Ref
R	Wed 26 Oct 1927	Castleford	0–3	Hull	Sandy Desert (Note: The official Hull F.C. archives give the venue as Sandy Desert but according to the official Castleford Tigers website they moved from this ground in 1926 (or 1927 - depending on the article).)	

=== Round 3 – semifinals ===
Involved 2 matches and 4 clubs

Game No	Fixture date	Home team	Score	Away team	Venue	Ref
1	Wed 2 Nov 1927	York	0–10	Hull	Clarence Street	
2	Thu 3 Nov 1927	Dewsbury	2–0	Hull Kingston Rovers	Crown Flatt	

=== Final ===
26 November 1927

Dewsbury	8 – 2	Hull
Tries: Coates, Fox; Goals: Joe Lyman		Goals: Beardshaw

Headingley, Leeds (Note: The venue is given as Crown Flatt by RUGBYLEAGUEproject but as Headingley by the Rothmans Rugby League Yearbook of 1991-92 and 1990-91)
Attendance: 21,700
Referee: J. Eddon (Swinton)

==== Teams ====
Dewsbury	No.	Hull
	Teams	
James Lyman	1	Ernest Jenney
Harold Raywood	2	Emlyn Gwynne
George Layhe	3	Herbert Beardshaw
Clifford Smith	4	Billy Batten Jr.
Joe Lyman	5	Jack Davies
Henry Coates	6	Stan Whitty
Cliff Midgley	7	Eddie Caswell
Billy Rhodes	8	Malcolm Short
G.T. Mitchell	9	R. W. Bolderson
Joseph Hobson	10	Harold Bowman
Percy Brown	11	Bob Taylor
Harry Bland	12	Jack Smallwood
Harold Fox	13	Tommy Bateson
??	Coach	Edgar Wrigley

=== The road to success ===
First round
Dewsbury	13
Huddersfield	9
Halifax	2
Batley	7
Hull Kingston Rovers	5 (2)
Keighley	8 (24)
Hunslet
bye
York	15
Bradford Northern	2
Leeds	12
Featherstone Rovers	2
Wakefield Trinity	4
Hull	12
Castleford	22
Bramley	0

Second round
Dewsbury	15
Batley	5
Hull Kingston Rovers	13
Hunslet	2
York	19
Leeds	7
Hull	7 (3)
Castleford	7 (0)

Semifinals
Dewsbury	2
Hull Kingston Rovers	0
York	0
Hull	10

Final
Dewsbury	8
Hull	2

== See also ==
- 1927–28 Northern Rugby Football League season
- Rugby league county cups
