= 1909–10 Yorkshire Cup =

- Structure: Regional knockout championship
- Teams: 13
- Winners: Huddersfield
- Runners-up: Batley

The 1909–10 Yorkshire Cup was the fifth occasion on which the Yorkshire Cup competition, a Rugby league tournament, was held. This year's final was between two clubs who had not previously played in the final and Huddersfield won the trophy by beating Batley by the score of 21–0. The match was played at Headingley, Leeds, now in West Yorkshire. The attendance was 22,000 and receipts were £778. This was Huddersfield's first appearance in what would be seven appearances in eight consecutive finals between 1909 and 1919 (which included four successive victories and six in total.)

== Background ==
This season there were again no junior/amateur clubs taking part and so the total of entries remained the same at thirteen. This, in turn, resulted in three byes in the first round.

== Competition and results ==
=== Round 1 ===
Involved 5 matches (with three byes) and 13 clubs

Game No	Fixture date	Home team	Score	Away team	Venue	Ref
1	Sat 16 Oct 1909	Bramley	7–7	Halifax	Barley Mow	
2	Sat 16 Oct 1909	Huddersfield	33–5	Hull Kingston Rovers	Fartown	
3	Sat 16 Oct 1909	Hunslet	18–0	Bradford Northern	Parkside	
4	Sat 16 Oct 1909	Leeds	2–3	Wakefield Trinity	Headingley	
5	Sat 16 Oct 1909	York	7–6	Hull	Clarence Street	
6		Batley		bye	.	
7		Dewsbury		bye	.	
8		Keighley		bye	.	

=== Round 1 – Replays ===
Involved 1 match and 2 clubs

Game No	Fixture date	Home team	Score	Away team	Venue	Ref
R	Mon 18 Oct 1909	Halifax	29–2	Bramley	Thrum Hall	

=== Round 2 – quarterfinals ===
Involved 4 matches and 8 clubs

Game No	Fixture date	Home team	Score	Away team	Venue	Ref
1	Sat 30 Oct 1909	Batley	8–4	Dewsbury	Mount Pleasant	
2	Sat 30 Oct 1909	Halifax	14–10	York	Thrum Hall	
3	Sat 30 Oct 1909	Huddersfield	12–4	Hunslet	Fartown	
4	Sat 30 Oct 1909	Keighley	8–8	Wakefield Trinity	Lawkholme Lane	

=== Round 2 – Replays ===
Involved 1 match and 2 clubs

Game No	Fixture date	Home team	Score	Away team	Venue	Ref
R	Wed 03 Nov 1909	Wakefield Trinity	7–3	Keighley	Belle Vue	

=== Round 3 – semifinals ===
Involved 2 matches and 4 clubs

Game No	Fixture date	Home team	Score	Away team	Venue	Att	Ref
1	Sat 13 Nov 1909	Batley	7–7	Wakefield Trinity	Mount Pleasant		
2	Sat 13 Nov 1909	Huddersfield	20-2	Halifax	Fartown	28600	

=== Semifinal - Replays ===
Involved 1 match and 2 clubs

Game No	Fixture date	Home team	Score	Away team	Venue	Ref
R	Wed 17 Nov 1909	Wakefield Trinity	3–11	Batley	Belle Vue	

=== Final ===
27 November 1909

Huddersfield	21 – 0	Batley
Tries: Sykes, Wrigley, Rosenfeld, Kitchen, Ainley; Goals: Holroyd (2), Wrigley

Headingley, Leeds
Attendance: 22,000
Referee: J. H. Smith (Widnes)

==== Teams ====
Huddersfield	No.	Batley
	teams	
Jack Bartholomew	1	Albert Senior
Edward Sykes	2	Eddie Ward
Edgar Wrigley	3	Wattie Davies
Albert Rosenfeld	4	William T. Davies
Billy Kitchin	5	Harry Thomas
Percy Holroyd	6	Joe Oakland
Jim Davies	7	John Jones
Wilfred Ainley	8	Jim Gath
Douglas Clark	9	Ted Fozzard
Fred Charlesworth	10	James Debney
Clon Sherwood	11	Willie Settle
William Trevarthen	12	Fred Hill
Elijah Watts	13	Arthur Kitson
	Coach	

=== The road to success ===
First round
Huddersfield	33
Hull Kingston Rovers	5
Hunslet	18
Bradford Northern	0
Bramley	7 (2)
Halifax	7 (29)
York	7
Hull	6
Batley
bye
Dewsbury
bye
Keighley
bye
Leeds	2
Wakefield Trinity	3

Second round
Huddersfield	12
Hunslet	4
Halifax	14
York	10
Batley	8
Dewsbury	4
Keighley	8 (3)
Wakefield Trinity	8 (7)

Semifinals
Huddersfield	20
Halifax	2
Batley	7 (11)
Wakefield Trinity	7 (3)

Final
Huddersfield	21
Batley	0

== See also ==
- 1909–10 Northern Rugby Football Union season
- Rugby league county cups
