= Andy Morton =

Australia international rugby league footballer

Personal information
- Full name: Andrew David Morton
- Born: 23 April 1882; Manly, New South Wales, Australia
- Died: 18 October 1950 (aged 68); St Leonards, New South Wales, Australia

Playing information
- Position: Wing, Centre, Fullback
Club
Years	Team	Pld	T	G	FG	P
1908	North Sydney	6	2	2	0	10
1909–11	Hull FC
1911–12	North Sydney	14	0	17	0	34
	Total	20	2	19	0	44
Representative
Years	Team	Pld	T	G	FG	P
1908–11	New South Wales	4	0	0	0	0
1909	Australia	1	0	0	0	0
1908–11	Metropolis	2	0	2	0	4
- Source: As of 21 June 2019

Andy Morton (1882–1950) was a pioneering Australian rugby league footballer who played in the 1900s and 1910s. An Australia international and New South Wales state representative backline player, he played club football for North Sydney and in England for Hull FC.

== Playing career ==
Morton played for the North Sydney club during the 1908 NSWRFL season, the first ever for rugby league in Australia. That season he played for New South Wales in the first ever interstate rugby league match. His club lost his services just before the finals, along with Norths' teammates Sid Deane, Jim Devereaux and Dinny Lutge as they had been selected to go on the 1908–09 Kangaroo tour of Great Britain. Morton was the first Australian to score a try in Britain: in their victory over Welsh club Mid-Rhondda in the first match of the tour. He was also selected to play on the wing in the second Test match loss, becoming Kangaroo No. 26. He scored 30pts (4t, 9g) in another 22 matches on tour. Morton and Norths' teammate Deveraux were signed by English club Hull, and remained in England to play.

Andy Morton played at centre in Hull FC's 7–7 draw with Leeds in the 1910 Challenge Cup Final during the 1909–10 season at Fartown Ground, Huddersfield, on Saturday 16 April 1910, in front of a crowd of 19,413, this was the first Challenge Cup Final to be drawn, and played at centre in the 12–26 defeat by Leeds in the 1910 Challenge Cup Final replay at Fartown Ground, Huddersfield, on Monday 18 April 1910, in front of a crowd of 11,608.

After two seasons with Hull, Morton returned to Australia and resumed his career with North Sydney.

== Death ==
Morton died at Sydney's Royal North Shore Hospital on 18 October 1950, age 68. His funeral was held the following afternoon at Northern Suburbs Crematorium.
