= Fred Webster (rugby league) =

GB & England international rugby league footballer (1882-1939)

Personal information
- Full name: Frederick Richard Webster
- Born: third ¼ 1882 Whittington, Derbyshire, England
- Died: March 1939 (aged 56–57) Leeds

Playing information
- Height: 5 ft 9 in (1.75 m)
- Weight: 13 st 4 lb (84 kg)
- Position: Forward
Club
Years	Team	Pld	T	G	FG	P
1902–19	Leeds	543	76	4		236
Representative
Years	Team	Pld	T	G	FG	P
≥1907–≤07	Yorkshire	≥1
1906–11	England	4	0	0	0	0
1910	Great Britain	3	0	0	0	0

Frederick "Fred" Webster (third ¼ 1882 – March 1939) was an English professional rugby league footballer who played in the 1900s and 1910s. He played at representative level for Great Britain, England and Yorkshire, and at club level for Brotherton ARLFC (in Brotherton, now represented by Brotherton Bulldogs ARLFC of the Pennine League), and Leeds (captain), as a forward.

== Background ==
Baines Cigarette card featuring Frederick Webster

Webster was born in Whittington Derbyshire, England.

== Playing career ==
=== International honours ===
Webster won caps for England while at Leeds in 1906 against Other Nationalities, in 1910 against Wales (2 matches), in 1911 against Wales, and won caps for Great Britain while at Leeds on the 1910 Great Britain Lions tour of Australia and New Zealand against Australia (2 matches), Australasia (2 matches), and New Zealand.

=== County honours ===
Webster won cap(s) for Yorkshire while at Leeds, including against New Zealand at Belle Vue, Wakefield on Wednesday 18 December 1907.

=== Championship appearances ===
Webster played as a forward in Leeds' 2–35 defeat by Huddersfield in the Championship Final during the 1914–15 season.

=== Challenge Cup Final appearances ===
Webster played as a forward, and was captain in Leeds' 7–7 draw with Hull F.C. in the 1909–10 Challenge Cup Final during the 1909–10 season at Fartown Ground, Huddersfield on Saturday 16 April 1910, in front of a crowd of 19,413, this was the first Challenge Cup Final to be drawn, and played as a forward, was captain, and scored a try in the 26–12 victory over Hull F.C. in the 1909–10 Challenge Cup Final replay during the 1909–10 season at Fartown Ground, Huddersfield on Monday 18 April 1910, in front of a crowd of 11,608, this was Leeds' first Challenge Cup Final win in their first appearance.

=== County Cup Final appearances ===
Webster played in Leeds' 5–24 defeat by Huddersfield in the 1919–20 Yorkshire Cup Final during the 1919–20 season at Thrum Hall, Halifax on Saturday 29 November 1919.

=== Career at Leeds ===
Webster joined Leeds from Brotherton in 1902, on the eve of his 20th birthday, and was a mainstay of the side for the next 18 years, he scored a club record eight tries in the 102–0 win over Coventry in 1913, later equalled by Eric 'Toowoomba Ghost' Harris. During Fred Webster's time at Leeds he made 543 appearances, a club record which stood for more than 60 years, only John Holmes has played more games for Leeds.

=== Testimonial match ===
Webster's Testimonial match at Leeds took place in 1919.

== The Leeds RL Greats ==
The Yorkshire Evening Post named Arthur Clues, Bert Cook, Ellery Hanley, Eric Harris, Vic Hey, John Holmes, Lewis Jones, Danny McGuire, Garry Schofield, and Frederick "Fred" Webster, as the greatest ever Leeds RL players.
