= 1909–10 Challenge Cup =

Rugby league competition

- Duration: 5 rounds
- Highest attendance: 19,413 & 11,608
- Winners: Leeds
- Runners-up: Hull F.C.

The 1909–10 Challenge Cup was the 14th staging of rugby league's oldest knockout competition, the Challenge Cup.

== First round ==
Date	Team one	Score one	Team two	Score two
26 Feb	Barrow	0	St Helens	15
26 Feb	Bramley	3	Rochdale Hornets	3
26 Feb	Dewsbury	3	Wakefield Trinity	8
26 Feb	Hull FC	10	Leigh	7
26 Feb	Hull Kingston Rovers	3	Leeds	5
26 Feb	Keighley	5	Broughton Rangers	0
26 Feb	Merthyr	7	Ebbw Vale	12
26 Feb	Millom	9	Brookland	4
26 Feb	Oldham	0	Huddersfield	2
26 Feb	Purston	10	Halifax	23
26 Feb	Runcorn	9	Bradford Northern	4
26 Feb	Salford	64	York Irish	0
26 Feb	Warrington	31	Wigan Highfield	3
26 Feb	Widnes	0	Hunslet	6
26 Feb	Wigan	16	Swinton	5
26 Feb	York	0	Batley	0
01 Mar	Batley	3	York	3
01 Mar	Rochdale Hornets	11	Bramley	5
01 Mar	York	0	Batley	8

== Second round ==
Date	Team one	Score one	Team two	Score two
12 Mar	Batley	0	Hull FC	8
12 Mar	Halifax	21	St Helens	6
12 Mar	Huddersfield	3	Ebbw Vale	8
12 Mar	Hunslet	2	Wakefield Trinity	2
12 Mar	Leeds	13	Rochdale Hornets	3
12 Mar	Runcorn	3	Keighley	5
12 Mar	Salford	12	Wigan	5
12 Mar	Warrington	37	Millom	0
16 Mar	Wakefield Trinity	2	Hunslet	5

== Quarterfinals ==
Date	Team one	Score one	Team two	Score two
19 Mar	Hull FC	13	Halifax	7
19 Mar	Keighley	4	Leeds	7
19 Mar	Salford	8	Ebbw Vale	2
19 Mar	Warrington	7	Hunslet	0

== Semifinals ==
Date	Team one	Score one	Team two	Score two
02 Apr	Hull FC	20	Salford	6
02 Apr	Warrington	10	Leeds	11

== Final ==
The final was contested by Leeds and Hull F.C. at Fartown in Huddersfield.

The final was played on Saturday 16 April 1910, where Leeds drew 7-7 with Hull F.C. at Fartown in front of a crowd of 19,413. The necessitated a replay just two days later and this resulted in Leeds defeating Hull 26-12 at the same ground.

This was Leeds' first Cup final win in their first Cup final appearance. Hull lost their third Cup final in a row.

=== First match ===
==== Teams ====
Hull: Harry Taylor, G. T. Cottrell, Jim Devereux, Andy Morton, (E. or Ned) Rogers, Harry Wallace, Billie Anderson, Tom Herridge, Will Osborne, Dick Taylor, William Holder, G. Connell, H. Walton

Leeds: Frank Young, J. Fawcett, Walter Goldthorpe, C. Gillie, F. Barron, E. Ware, J. Sanders, W. Biggs, Billy Jarman, Fred Harrison, Harry Topham, Fred Webster, Billy Ward

==== Result ====
Leeds: 7

Leeds Tries: Walter Goldthorpe

Leeds Goals: Frank Young 2

Hull: 7

Hull Tries: G. T. Cottrell

Hull Goals: (E. or Ned) Rogers, Harry Wallace

Half-time: 2-7

Attendance: 19,413 (at Fartown, Huddersfield)

=== Replay ===
==== Teams ====
Leeds: Frank Young, Harold Rowe, Walter Goldthorpe, C. Gillie, F. Barron, E. Ware, J. Fawcett, Fred Webster, Fred Harrison, Harry Topham, Billy Ward, Billy Jarman, S. Whittaker

Hull: E. Rogers, G. T. Cottrell, Jim Devereux, Andy Morton, Ernest Atkinson, Ned Rogers, Harry Wallace, Tom Herridge, Will Osborne, Dick Taylor, William Holder, G. Connell, H. Walton

==== Result ====
Leeds: 26

Leeds Tries: Rowe, Walter Goldthorpe, Fred Webster, Harry Topham

Leeds Goals: Frank Young 7

Hull: 12

Hull Tries: G. Connell, H. Walton

Hull Goals: (E. or Ned) Rogers 3

Half-time: 16-0

Attendance: 11,608 (at Fartown, Huddersfield)
