= Wattie Davies =

Welsh rugby league and union footballer

Personal information
- Full name: Wharton Peers Davies
- Born: 10 November 1873 Milford Haven, Pembrokeshire, Wales
- Died: 5 June 1961 (aged 87) Spen Valley district, England

Playing information
- Height: 5 ft 5 in (1.65 m)
- Weight: 11 st 6 lb (73 kg; 160 lb)

Rugby union
- Position: Fullback
Club
Years	Team	Pld	T	G	FG	P
≤1893–≥93	Cardiff Northern RFC
1893–96	Cardiff RFC	17	7	0	0	21
	Total	17	7	0	0	21
Representative
Years	Team	Pld	T	G	FG	P
≤1893–≥93	Cardiff and District XV

Rugby league
- Position: Wing, Centre
Club
Years	Team	Pld	T	G	FG	P
1896–1912	Batley	444	122	403	50	1278
Representative
Years	Team	Pld	T	G	FG	P
1897–1908	Yorkshire	16	7	17	0	55
1897–1908	Yorkshire trials	13	6	14	0	46
1902	The Rest	1	0	0	0	0

Wharton "Wattie" Peers Davies (10 November 1873 – 5 June 1961) was a Welsh rugby union, and professional rugby league footballer who played in the 1890s, 1900s and 1910s. He played representative level rugby union (RU) for Cardiff and District XV, and at club level for (the now defunct) Cardiff Northern RFC and Cardiff RFC, as a fullback, and representative level rugby league (RL) for Yorkshire, and at club level for Batley, as a three-quarter, i.e. wing, or centre. Davies still holds Batley's career appearance, goal, and point records, and is one of less than twenty-five Welshmen to have scored more than 1,000 points in their rugby league careers.

Wattie Davies made his début for Batley against Huddersfield at Mount Pleasant, Batley on Saturday 10 October 1896.

Davies played on the wing, and unusually missed two conversions in Batley's 10-3 victory over St. Helens in the final of the 1897 Challenge Cup at Headingley, Leeds on Saturday 24 April 1897, in front of a crowd of 13,492, played on the wing, and scored a drop goal in Batley's 7-0 victory over Bradford F.C. in the final of the 1898 Challenge Cup at Headingley, Leeds on Saturday 23 April 1898, in front of a crowd of 27,941, played on the wing, and scored a try in the 6-0 victory over Warrington in the final of the 1901 Challenge Cup at Headingley, Leeds, in front of a crowd of 29,563. Davies represented Yorkshire while at Batley, and scored five conversions against Durham at Belle Vue, Wakefield during November 1903. and played at centre in the 0-21 defeat by Huddersfield in the 1909–10 Yorkshire Cup Final during the 1909–10 season at Headingley, Leeds on Saturday 27 November 1909, in front of a crowd of 22,000.

Davies later worked as an insurance agent. He died aged 87 in Spen Valley district, West Riding of Yorkshire.
