= Harry Wallace (rugby league) =

England international rugby league footballer

Personal information
- Full name: Henry Wallace
- Born: 16 February 1882 North Shields, Northumberland
- Died: 8 May 1917 (aged 35) Arras, France

Playing information
- Position: Stand-off, Scrum-half
Club
| Years | Team | Pld | T | G | FG | P |
|---|---|---|---|---|---|---|
| 1906–10 | Hull F.C. | 164 | 40 | 55 | 0 | 230 |
Representative
| Years | Team | Pld | T | G | FG | P |
| ≤1907–≥07 | Yorkshire | ≥1 |
| 1908 | England | 1 | 0 | 0 | 0 | 0 |
- Military career
- Allegiance: United Kingdom
- Branch: British Army
- Service years: 1914-17
- Rank: Private
- Unit: Durham Light Infantry
- Conflicts: World War I: Battle of Arras (KIA)

Henry Wallace (16 February 1882 – 8 May 1917) was an English professional rugby league footballer who played in the 1900s and 1910s. He played at representative level for England and Yorkshire, and at club level for Hull F.C., as a stand-off, or scrum-half. Harry Wallace served as Private with the 10th Battalion of the Durham Light Infantry in World War I, and died in service at Arras, France, leaving behind a widow and five children.

== Playing career ==
=== Club career ===
Harry Wallace played stand-off in Hull F.C.'s 0-14 defeat by Hunslet in the 1908 Challenge Cup Final during the 1907–08 season at Fartown Ground, Huddersfield on Saturday 25 April 1908, in front of a crowd of 18,000, played stand-off in the 0-17 defeat by Wakefield Trinity in the 1909 Challenge Cup Final during the 1908–09 season at Headingley, Leeds on Saturday 24 April 1909, in front of a crowd of 23,587. played stand-off in the 7-7 draw with Leeds in the 1910 Challenge Cup Final during the 1909–10 season at Fartown Ground, Huddersfield, on Saturday 16 April 1910, in front of a crowd of 19,413, this was the first Challenge Cup Final to be drawn, and played scrum-half, and scored a goal in the 12-26 defeat by Leeds in the 1910 Challenge Cup Final replay at Fartown Ground, Huddersfield, on Monday 18 April 1910, in front of a crowd of 11,608.

=== Representative honours ===
Wallace won a cap for England while at Hull in 1908 against New Zealand.

Wallace won cap(s) for Yorkshire while at Hull, including against New Zealand at Belle Vue, Wakefield on Wednesday 18 December 1907.
