= Fred Harrison (rugby league) =

GB & England international rugby league footballer

Personal information
- Full name: Frederick Harrison
- Born: unknown
- Died: unknown

Playing information
- Position: Forward
Club
Years	Team	Pld	T	G	FG	P
1906–15	Leeds	280	18	0	0	54
Representative
Years	Team	Pld	T	G	FG	P
1911–12	Yorkshire	2	0	0	0	0
1911–12	Great Britain	3	0	0	0	0
1911–13	England	3	0	0	0	0

Frederick "Fred" Harrison (birth unknown – death unknown) was an English professional rugby league footballer who played in the 1910s. He played at representative level for Great Britain and England, and at club level for Leeds, as a forward.

== Playing career ==
=== Club career ===
Harrison played as a forward in Leeds' 7-7 draw with Hull F.C. in the 1910 Challenge Cup Final during the 1909–10 season at Fartown Ground, Huddersfield on Saturday 16 April 1910, in front of a crowd of 19,413, this was the first Challenge Cup Final to be drawn, and played as a forward in the 26-12 victory over Hull F.C. in the 1910 Challenge Cup Final replay during the 1909–10 season at Fartown Ground, Huddersfield on Monday 18 April 1910, in front of a crowd of 11,608, this was Leeds' first Challenge Cup Final win in their first appearance.

=== International honours ===
Harrison won caps for England while at Leeds in 1911 against Australia, in 1912 against Wales, in 1913 against Wales, and won caps for Great Britain while at Leeds in 1911 against Australia (2 matches), and in 1912 against Australia.
