= Percy Holroyd =

England international rugby league footballer

Personal information
- Full name: Percy Holroyd
- Born: Huddersfield

Playing information
- Position: Stand-off
Club
Years	Team	Pld	T	G	FG	P
1902–≥09	Huddersfield
Representative
Years	Team	Pld	T	G	FG	P
1909	England	1	1	0	0	3

Percy Holroyd was an English professional rugby league footballer who played in the 1900s. He played at representative level for England, and at club level for Huddersfield, as a stand-off. Percy Holroyd was possibly the first player local to Huddersfield be awarded some sort of benefit, his début was against Broughton Rangers on Saturday 8 November 1902, and nine seasons later, for his service to Huddersfield, he was presented with the sum of £50 (based on increases in average earnings, this would be approximately £18,850 in 2017).

== Playing career ==
=== Club career ===
Holroyd played fullback, and scored two goals in Huddersfield's 21–0 victory over Batley in the 1909 Yorkshire Cup Final during the 1909–10 season at Headingley, Leeds on Saturday 27 November 1909.

=== International honours ===
Holroyd won a cap for England while at Huddersfield in 1909 against Wales.
