= Ernest Atkinson =

English rugby league footballer

Personal information
- Full name: Ernest Atkinson
- Born: unknown
- Died: unknown

Playing information
- Position: Wing
Club
Years	Team	Pld	T	G	FG	P
1905–10	Hull FC

Ernest Atkinson (birth unknown - death unknown) was a professional rugby league footballer who played in the 1900s and 1910s. He played at club level for Hull FC, as a wing.

== Playing career ==
=== Challenge Cup Final appearances ===
Ernest Atkinson did not play in Hull FC's 7–7 draw with Leeds in the 1910 Challenge Cup Final during the 1909–10 season at Fartown Ground, Huddersfield, on Saturday 16 April 1910, in front of a crowd of 19,413, this was the first Challenge Cup Final to be drawn, however he did play on the wing in the 12–26 defeat by Leeds in the 1910 Challenge Cup Final replay at Fartown Ground, Huddersfield, on Monday 18 April 1910, in front of a crowd of 11,608.
