= Frank Young (rugby, born c. 1885) =

GB & Wales international rugby league & union footballer

- Frank 'Bucket' Young
- Full name: Frank H. Young
- Born: 25 June 1885 Cardiff, Wales
- Died: 1941 (aged 55–56)
- Height: 5 ft 7 in (170 cm)
- Weight: 12 st 8 lb (80 kg)

Rugby union career
Senior career
Years	Team	Apps	(Points)
1902-05	Cardiff RFC	18	
- London Welsh RFC
- Bristol Rugby
- Glamorgan
- Rugby league career

Playing information
- Position: Fullback
Club
Years	Team	Pld	T	G	FG	P
1906–11	Leeds	159	1	122	0	247
Representative
Years	Team	Pld	T	G	FG	P
1909–10	Wales	2
1909	Great Britain	1	0	0	0	0

Frank H. "Bucket" Young (1885–1941) was a Welsh rugby union, and professional rugby league footballer who played in the 1900s and 1910s. He played representative level rugby union (RU) for Glamorgan, and at club level for Cardiff RFC, London Welsh RFC and Bristol Rugby, and representative level rugby league (RL) for Great Britain and Wales, and at club level for Leeds, as a fullback.

== Background ==
Young was born in Cardiff, Wales.

== Playing career ==
=== Rugby union ===
Young was a promising player for Cardiff, playing in the reserves before being promoted to the senior team. Young only played one senior season, and may have achieved more but was kept out of the squad by Bert Winfield, one of the greatest Welsh kickers of all time. Young played several games for London Welsh and Bristol before switching to rugby league. He was described by ex-Wales union captain, Arthur Harding, as 'He has a lovely kick, of the Jackett type, and a useful tackler.' Frank Young represented Glamorgan.

=== Rugby league ===
Young initially considered joining Oldham, but subsequently joined Leeds in 1906 for a signing-on fee of £70 (based on increases in average earnings, this would be approximately £24,870 in 2013). Frank Young was badly injured during the 34–25 victory over Metropolis at the Royal Agricultural Society Showground on Saturday 18 June 1910 during the 1910 Great Britain Lions tour of Australia and New Zealand, he played no further part in the tour, and failed to fully recover from the injury, retiring in March of the 1910–11 Northern Rugby Football Union season.

Young won caps for Wales (RL) while at Leeds including in 1909 against England, and won a cap for Great Britain (RL) while at Leeds in 1909 against Australia.

Young played fullback, and scored two goals in Leeds' 7-7 draw with Hull F.C. in the 1909–10 Challenge Cup Final during the 1909–10 season at Fartown Ground, Huddersfield on Saturday 16 April 1910, in front of a crowd of 19,413, and played fullback, and scored 7-goals in the 26–12 victory over Hull F.C. in the 1909–10 Challenge Cup Final replay during the 1909–10 season at Fartown Ground, Huddersfield, on Monday 18 April 1910, in front of a crowd of 11,608, this was Leeds' first Challenge Cup Final win in their first appearance.
