= George Cotterill =

George Cotterill may refer to:

- George Cotterill (footballer) (1868–1950), English footballer
- George F. Cotterill (1865–1958), mayor of Seattle
- George Edward Cotterill (1839–1913), English cricketer

== See also ==
- George Cottrell, British financier and convicted felon
- George Cottrell (rugby), English rugby union and rugby league player
