= Billy Jarman =

GB international rugby league footballer

Personal information
- Full name: Samuel William Jarman
- Born: first ¼ 1887 Leeds district, England
- Died: 15 August 1916 (aged 29) Somme, France

Playing information
- Position: Fullback, Forward
Club
Years	Team	Pld	T	G	FG	P
1908–14	Leeds		35			113
Representative
Years	Team	Pld	T	G	FG	P
1914	Great Britain	2	0	0	0	0

Samuel William Jarman (birth registered first ¼ 1887 – 15 August 1916) was an English professional rugby league footballer who played in the 1900s and 1910s. He played at representative level for Great Britain, and at club level for Leeds, as a fullback, or forward.

== Background ==
Billy Jarman's birth was registered in Leeds district, West Riding of Yorkshire, England, and he was killed aged 29 at the Battle of the Somme, France, his name is listed within the Thiepval Memorial.

== Playing career ==
=== International honours ===
Selected to go on the 1914 Great Britain Lions tour of Australia and New Zealand while at Leeds, Jarman won caps for Great Britain against Australia (2 matches).

Upon returning from the 1914 tour of Australasia Jarman left to take part in World War I, and lost his life.

Only five players have played test matches for Great Britain as both a back, and a forward, they are; Colin Dixon, Frank Gallagher, Laurie Gilfedder, Billy Jarman, and Harry Street.

=== Challenge Cup Final appearances ===
Billy Jarman played as a forward in Leeds' 7–7 draw with Hull F.C. in the 1909–10 Challenge Cup Final during the 1909–10 season at Fartown Ground, Huddersfield on Saturday 16 April 1910, in front of a crowd of 19,413, this was the first Challenge Cup Final to be drawn, and played as a forward in the 26–12 victory over Hull F.C. in the 1909–10 Challenge Cup Final replay during the 1909–10 season at Fartown Ground, Huddersfield, on Monday 18 April 1910, in front of a crowd of 11,608, this was Leeds' first Challenge Cup Final win in their first appearance.
