= Fred Hill (rugby league) =

England international rugby league footballer

Personal information
- Full name: Frederick Hill

Playing information
- Position: Forward
Club
Years	Team	Pld	T	G	FG	P
1906–≥12	Batley	253	13	2	0	43
Representative
Years	Team	Pld	T	G	FG	P
1909	England	1	0	0	0	0

Frederick Hill was an English professional rugby league footballer who played in the 1900s and 1910s. He played at representative level for England, and at club level for Batley, as a forward.

== Playing career ==
=== Club career ===
Hill made his debut for Batley in December 1906.

Hill played as a forward in Batley's 0-21 defeat by Huddersfield in the 1909–10 Yorkshire Cup Final during the 1909–10 season at Headingley, Leeds on Saturday 27 November 1909, in front of a crowd of 22,000, and played as a forward in the 17-3 victory over Hull F.C. in the 1912–13 Yorkshire Cup Final during the 1912–13 season at Headingley, Leeds on Saturday 23 November 1912, in front of a crowd of 16,000.

At the end of his career, Hill was awarded a joint benefit match in 1921, along with fellow Batley forwards Harry Hodgson and Arthur Kitson.

=== International honours ===
Hill won a cap for England while at Batley in 1909 against Wales.
