= J. H. Wood (Yorkshire cricketer) =

English cricketer

J. H. Wood was an English first-class cricketer, who played two matches for Yorkshire County Cricket Club in 1881. In his only first-class innings he opened the batting and scored 14 runs out of 388, as Yorkshire defeated Surrey by an innings and 217 at Fartown Ground, Huddersfield. He played in the return fixture against Surrey at The Oval, but failed to bat as he was 'absent hurt', and never played for Yorkshire again. He played club cricket for Sowerby Bridge C.C., and scored 44 against Nottinghamshire Colts in 1880.

No details are presently known as to his birth and death information.
