= Dick Gemmell =

GB international rugby league footballer

Personal information
- Full name: Richard Gemmell
- Born: 6 October 1936; Warrington, Lancashire, England
- Died: 18 June 2017 (aged 80)

Playing information
- Position: Centre
Club
| Years | Team | Pld | T | G | FG | P |
|---|---|---|---|---|---|---|
| 1961–64 | Hull F.C. | 84 | 24 | 0 | 0 | 72 |
| 1964–67 | Leeds | 135 | 48 | 0 | 0 | 144 |
| 1967–70 | Hull F.C. | 70 | 12 | 0 | 0 | 36 |
| | Total | 289 | 84 | 0 | 0 | 252 |
Representative
| Years | Team | Pld | T | G | FG | P |
| 1968 | Lancashire | 1 | 2 | 0 | 0 | 6 |
| 1964–69 | Great Britain | 3 | 2 | 0 | 0 | 6 |

Richard Gemmell (6 October 1936 – 18 June 2017) was a professional rugby league footballer who played in the 1960s and 1970s. He played at representative level for both Great Britain and Lancashire, and at club level for Orford Tannery ARLFC, Hull F.C. (two spells) (captain) and Leeds, as a centre.

== Early life ==
Gemmell was born on 6 October 1936. The eldest of six children, he grew up in the Whitecross area of Warrington.

== Playing career ==
=== Club career ===
Gemmell played at centre in Leeds' 2–18 defeat by Wakefield Trinity in the 1964 Yorkshire Cup Final during the 1964–65 season at Fartown Ground, Huddersfield on Saturday 31 October 1964.

Gemmell played at centre in Hull F.C.'s 12–9 victory over Featherstone Rovers in the 1969 Yorkshire Cup Final during the 1969–70 season at Headingley, Leeds on Saturday 20 September 1969.

=== Representative honours ===
Gemmell represented Lancashire while at Hull, and is one of only four players to do so, they are; Ellis Clarkson, Bob Taylor, Dick Gemmell, and Steve Prescott.

Gemmell won caps for Great Britain while at Leeds in 1964 against France, and while at Hull in 1968 against France, and in 1969 against France.

== Post-playing career ==
After retiring as a player, Gemmell joined the board of directors at Hull in 1975. He was the team manager for Great Britain on their tours to the Southern Hemisphere in 1979 and 1984.

He died on 18 June 2017, aged 80.
