= Tom Herridge =

English rugby league footballer

- Thomas Herridge (standing), and Jim Devereux (sitting)

Personal information
- Full name: Thomas Herridge
- Born: c. 1883 Bristol district, England
- Died: c. 1930 (aged 45) York, England

Playing information
- Position: Forward
Club
Years	Team	Pld	T	G	FG	P
≤1907–07	York
1907–20	Hull FC	392	56	2	0	172
	Total	392	56	2	0	172
Representative
Years	Team	Pld	T	G	FG	P
≤1907–≥07	Yorkshire	≥1
- Military career
- Allegiance: United Kingdom
- Branch: British Army
- Service years: 1914-18
- Rank: Gunner
- Unit: Royal Field Artillery: 37th (Howitzer) Brigade
- Conflicts: World War I

Thomas Herridge (c. 1883 – c. 1930) was an English professional rugby league footballer who played in the 1900s, 1910s and 1920s, and professional boxer of the 1900s. He played at representative level for Yorkshire, and at club level for York and Hull F.C., as a forward.

== Background ==
Tom Herridge's birth was registered in Bristol district, Gloucestershire. He was a gunner in the 37th (Howitzer) Brigade of the Royal Field Artillery during World War I. He died in July 1930 in York.

== Playing career ==
=== County Honours ===
Tom Herridge won cap(s) for Yorkshire while at York during the 1906–07 season, and while at Hull F.C., including the 4-23 defeat by New Zealand in the 1907–08 New Zealand rugby tour of Australia and Great Britain match at Belle Vue, Wakefield on Wednesday 18 December 1907.

=== Challenge Cup Final appearances ===
Tom Herridge played as a forward in Hull F.C.'s 0-14 defeat by Hunslet in the 1908 Challenge Cup Final during the 1907–08 season at Fartown Ground, Huddersfield on Saturday 25 April 1908, in front of a crowd of 18,000, as a forward in the 0-17 defeat by Wakefield Trinity in the 1909 Challenge Cup Final during the 1908–09 season at Headingley, Leeds on Saturday 24 April 1909, in front of a crowd of 23,587, as a forward in the 7-7 draw with Leeds in the 1910 Challenge Cup Final during the 1909–10 season at Fartown Ground, Huddersfield, on Saturday 16 April 1910, in front of a crowd of 19,413, this was the first Challenge Cup Final to be drawn, as a forward in the 12-26 defeat by Leeds in the replay at Fartown Ground, Huddersfield, on Monday 18 April 1910, in front of a crowd of 11,608, and as a forward in the 6-0 victory over Wakefield Trinity in the 1913–14 Challenge Cup Final during the 1913–14 season at Thrum Hall, Halifax, in front of a crowd of 19,000.

=== Club career ===
Tom Herridge was transferred from York to Hull F.C. on Monday 12 August 1907, he made his début for Hull F.C. on Thursday 5 September 1907.

Season	Appearances	Tries	Goals	Points	Notes
1907–08 season	40	7	–	21	
1908–09 season	37	5	–	15	
1909–10 season	40	6	–	18	
1910–11 season	35	2	–	6	
1911–12 season	39	7	–	21	
1912–13 season	38	7	–	21	
1913–14 season	36	2	1	8	
1914–15 season	41	7	–	21	
1915–16 season	29	7	1	23	
1916–17 season	5	–	–	–	
1917–18 season	0	–	–	–	In The Army
1918–19 season	15	3	–	9	
1919–20 season	37	3	–	9	
Totals	392	2	56	172	

=== Testimonial match ===
Testimonial matches at Hull F.C. were shared with; Jim Devereux, Tom Herridge, William Holder and Ned Rogers, and took place against Keighley at The Boulevard, Hull on Saturday 29 January 1921, and against York at The Boulevard, Hull on Saturday 12 February 1921.

== Boxing career ==
Tom Herridge had a number of professional boxing bouts, including; the knockout defeat by future National Sporting Club (NSC) (subsequently known as the British Boxing Board of Control (BBBofC)) British heavyweight title champion; James William "Iron" Hague at the Riding School, Cavalry Barracks, York on Wednesday 30 January 1907, and the first-round knockout victory over Corporal Ray (heavyweight champion of the 18th Royal Hussars) promoted by the York Rifle Volunteers at York on Friday 12 April 1907.

== Genealogical information ==
Tom Herridge's marriage to Nellie (née Linley, birth registered fourth ¼ 1887 in York district) was registered during first ¼ 1909 in York district. They had children; the future heavyweight boxer; Tom Herridge (birth registered during fourth ¼ 1911 in York district).
