= Billy Ward (rugby league) =

GB & England international rugby league footballer

Personal information
- Full name: William Ward
- Born: second ¼ 1888 Whitehaven, England
- Died: unknown

Playing information
- Height: 5 ft 10 in (178 cm)
- Weight: 13 st 4 lb (84 kg)
- Position: Forward
Club
Years	Team	Pld	T	G	FG	P
	Whitehaven
	Egremont
1909–23	Leeds	280	84	1	0	254
	Total	280	84	1	0	254
Representative
Years	Team	Pld	T	G	FG	P
1910–11	England	2	0	0	0	0
1910	Great Britain	1	0	0	0	0
1910–23	Cumberland	20	7	0	0	21

William Ward (second ¼ 1888 – death unknown) was an English professional rugby league footballer who played in the 1900s, 1910s and 1920s. He played at representative level for Great Britain and England, and at club level for Whitehaven, Egremont and Leeds (for 13-years), as a forward.

== Background ==
Billy Ward's birth was registered in Whitehaven, Cumberland, England.

== Playing career ==
=== Challenge Cup Final appearances ===
Billy Ward played as a forward in Leeds' 7-7 draw with Hull F.C. in the 1909–10 Challenge Cup Final during the 1909–10 season at Fartown Ground, Huddersfield on Saturday 16 April 1910, in front of a crowd of 19,413, this was the first Challenge Cup Final to be drawn, and played as a forward in the 26-12 victory over Hull F.C. in the 1909–10 Challenge Cup Final replay during the 1909–10 season at Fartown Ground, Huddersfield on Monday 18 April 1910, in front of a crowd of 11,608, this was Leeds' first Challenge Cup Final win in their first appearance.

=== County Cup Final appearances ===
Billy Ward played as a forward in Leeds' 11-3 victory over Dewsbury in the 1921–22 Yorkshire Cup Final during the 1921–22 season at Thrum Hall, Halifax on Saturday 26 November 1921.

=== International honours ===
Billy Ward won caps for England while at Leeds in 1910 against Wales, in 1911 against Australia, and won a cap for Great Britain while at Leeds on the 1910 Great Britain Lions tour of Australia and New Zealand against Australia.
