= Bill Hopper (rugby league) =

Wales international rugby league footballer

Personal information
- Full name: Ernest William Hopper
- Born: 18 November 1925; Maesteg, Wales
- Died: September 2008 (aged 82); Castleford, England

Playing information
- Height: 6 ft 1 in (185 cm)
- Weight: 15 st 10 lb (100 kg)
- Position: Prop
Club
Years	Team	Pld	T	G	FG	P
1948–49	Warrington	5	0	0	0	0
1950–57/58	Leeds	227	15	1	0	47
	Total	232	15	1	0	47
Representative
Years	Team	Pld	T	G	FG	P
1953	Wales	1	0	0	0	0

Ernest William Hopper (18 November 1925 – September 2008) was a Welsh professional rugby league footballer who played in the 1940s and 1950s. He played at representative level for Wales, and at club level for Warrington, and Leeds, as a prop.

== Background ==
William Hopper's birth was registered in Bridgend, Wales, and he died in September 2008 in Castleford, England, aged 82.

== Playing career ==
=== International honours ===
Hopper won a cap for Wales while at Leeds in 1953.

=== Challenge Cup Final appearances ===
Bill Hopper played at prop in Leeds' 9–7 victory over Barrow in the 1956–57 Challenge Cup Final during the 1956–57 season at Wembley Stadium, London on Saturday 11 May 1957.
