= George Cottrell (rugby) =

English rugby league & union footballer

Personal information
- Full name: George Thomas Cottrell
- Born: third ¼ 1881; Cheltenham district, Gloucestershire, England
- Died: first ¼ 1963 (aged 81); Hull district, England

Playing information

Rugby union
- Position: Full-back, Centre
Club
| Years | Team | Pld | T | G | FG | P |
|---|---|---|---|---|---|---|
| ≤1905–≤05 | Cheltenham All Saints RFC |
| ≤1905–06 | Cheltenham RFC |
| | Total | 0 | 0 | 0 | 0 | 0 |
Representative
| Years | Team | Pld | T | G | FG | P |
| 1903/04 | Gloucestershire | ≥1 |

Rugby league
- Position: Wing, Centre
Club
| Years | Team | Pld | T | G | FG | P |
|---|---|---|---|---|---|---|
| 1906–07 | Halifax RLFC |
| 1907–14 | Hull FC |
| 1914–≥14 | Keighley |
| | Total | 0 | 0 | 0 | 0 | 0 |

George Thomas Cottrell (third ¼ 1881 – first ¼ 1963), also known by the nickname of "Rocky", was an English rugby union and professional rugby league footballer who played in the 1900s and 1910s. He played representative level rugby union (RU) for Gloucestershire and at club level for Cheltenham All Saints RFC (associated with All Saints' Church, Cheltenham) and Cheltenham RFC, as a full-back, or centre, and club level rugby league (RL) for Halifax RLFC, Hull FC and Keighley, as a wing, or centre.

== Background ==
George Cottrell's birth was registered in Cheltenham district, Gloucestershire, England, and his death was registered in Hull district, East Riding of Yorkshire.

== Rugby union playing career ==
=== Notable tour matches ===
George Cottrell played in Cheltenham's 0-18 defeat by The Original All Blacks during the 1905–1906 New Zealand tour in Europe and North America at Athletic and Recreation Ground, Cheltenham on Wednesday 6 December 1905.

== Rugby league playing career ==
=== Championship final appearances ===
George Cottrell played in Halifax's 18-3 victory Oldham in the Championship Final during the 1906–07 season.

=== Challenge Cup Final appearances ===
George Cottrell played at centre in Hull FC's 0-14 defeat by Hunslet in the 1908 Challenge Cup Final during the 1907–08 season at Fartown Ground, Huddersfield on Saturday 25 April 1908, in front of a crowd of 18,000, played at centre in the 0-17 defeat by Wakefield Trinity in the 1909 Challenge Cup Final during the 1908–09 season at Headingley, Leeds on Saturday 24 April 1909, in front of a crowd of 23,587. played on the wing in Hull FC's 7-7 draw with Leeds in the 1910 Challenge Cup Final during the 1909–10 season at Fartown Ground, Huddersfield, on Saturday 16 April 1910, in front of a crowd of 19,413, this was the first Challenge Cup Final to be drawn, he played on the wing in the 12-26 defeat by Leeds in the 1910 Challenge Cup Final replay at Fartown Ground, Huddersfield, on Monday 18 April 1910, in front of a crowd of 11,608.

=== Club career ===
George Cottrell transferred from Cheltenham All Saints RFC (associated with All Saints' Church, Cheltenham) to Cheltenham RFC, he changed rugby football codes from rugby union to rugby league when he transferred from Cheltenham RFC to Halifax during August 1906, he transferred from Halifax to Hull F.C. on 13 July 1907, he transferred from Hull F.C. to Keighley during June 1914.
