= Jim Devereux =

Australian RL coach and former Australia international rugby league footballer

Jimmy Devereux
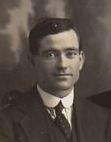

Personal information
- Full name: James Devereux
- Born: 27 June 1887 Crows Nest, New South Wales, Australia
- Died: 7 March 1934 (aged 46) Wisbech, England, United Kingdom

Playing information

Rugby union
- Position: ?
Club
Years	Team	Pld	T	G	FG	P
	?

Rugby league
- Position: Centre
Club
Years	Team	Pld	T	G	FG	P
1908	North Sydney	6	4	0	0	12
1909–10	Hull FC		21
1910–13	North Sydney	11	5	0	0	15
1913–21	Hull FC	181	101	5	0	313
	Total	198	131	5	0	340
Representative
Years	Team	Pld	T	G	FG	P
1907–13	New South Wales	6	3	0	0	9
1908–09	Australia	8	3	1	0	11

Coaching information
Club
Years	Team	Gms	W	D	L	W%
1924–25	North Sydney	20	9	1	10	45

James Devereux (1887–1934), also known by the nickname of "Muscles", was a pioneering Australian rugby league footballer who played in the 1900s, 1910s and 1920s. As New South Wales state and Australia national representative three-quarter back, he played in the New South Wales Rugby Football League premiership from its first season in 1908 for the North Sydney club, before playing several seasons in England with Hull FC. He later returned to Australia and coached North Sydney.

== Playing career ==
The son of Irish immigrant parents, Michael and Honorah Devereux, Devereux played for the first ever New South Wales rugby league team in their début match against New Zealand, and later on was selected to play in the first ever trans-Tasman test, which was début match of the Australia national rugby league team against New Zealand on the return leg of their tour of Britain. Devereaux is listed on the Australian Players Register as Kangaroo No. 4. He went on to play in all three matches.

Devereaux was a member of the Australian side selected for the first ever Kangaroo tour and was the first Australian to score a try in rugby league against Great Britain when he got a hat-trick in the first ever Test between the nations. After the tour he stayed in England and played for Hull FC, and became the first Colonial player to score 100 tries for the club. He was awarded Life Membership of the New South Wales Rugby League in 1914.

Jim Devereux played at centre in Hull FC's 7–7 draw with Leeds in the 1910 Challenge Cup Final during the 1909–10 season at Fartown Ground, Huddersfield, on Saturday 16 April 1910, in front of a crowd of 19,413 as this was the first Challenge Cup Final to be drawn. He also played at centre in the 12–26 defeat by Leeds in the 1910 Challenge Cup Final replay at Fartown Ground, Huddersfield, on Monday 18 April 1910, in front of a crowd of 11,608, and played stand-off in the 6–0 victory over Wakefield Trinity in the 1914 Challenge Cup Final during the 1913–14 season at Thrum Hall, Halifax, in front of a crowd of 19,000.

Devereux was in England during World War I and served in the military. In April 1916 he gained selection in an Australasian servicemen's rugby union side but the war he resumed his playing career with Hull.

Testimonial matches at Hull F.C. were shared with; Jim Devereux, Tom Herridge, William Holder and Ned Rogers, and took place against Keighley at The Boulevard, Hull on Saturday 29 January 1921, and against York at The Boulevard, Hull on Saturday 12 February 1921.

== Post playing ==
Returning to Australia after the War, Devereux coached North Sydney in the 1924 NSWRFL season, and worked as a labourer on the construction of the Sydney Harbour Bridge. On 3 December 1929, his leg was crushed in an industrial accident on the bridge, and was subsequently amputated at Royal North Shore Hospital. Devereux was unable to work thereafter, and came close to destitution. The North Sydney Leagues Club voted him a £50 donation in 1932 to assist with living costs.

Devereux died in England on 7 March 1934 as stated in the Sydney Sun by Claude Corbett on 22 March 1934. The Sydney Sun newspaper noted on 30 October 1941, that "Devereux had died about 4 years ago." Some argued for many years that he died at sea, but his death was later confirmed as being registered at Wisbech in Cambridgeshire. His wife, Daisy Elizabeth Deveruex née Heath, did not remarry and died at Leeds in 1956.

On 26 August 2006, the North Sydney club announced their team of the century, with Devereux named in the centres.

Sporting positions
Preceded by Chris McKivat; 1921–1922	Coach North Sydney; 1924–1925	Succeeded by Tedda Courtney; 1930
