= 1921–22 Challenge Cup =

Rugby league competition

- Duration: 5 rounds
- Winners: Rochdale Hornets
- Runners-up: Hull F.C.

The 1921–22 Challenge Cup was the 22nd staging of rugby league's oldest knockout competition, the Challenge Cup.

== First round ==
Date	Team one	Score one	Team two	Score two
25 Feb	Askam	15	Cadishead	3
25 Feb	Barrow	20	Salford	2
25 Feb	Batley	3	Featherstone Rovers	5
25 Feb	Bradford Northern	0	Keighley	10
25 Feb	Broughton Rangers	13	St Helens	0
25 Feb	Dewsbury	13	Warrington	2
25 Feb	Elland Wanderers	0	Oldham	29
25 Feb	Hull FC	24	Halifax	10
25 Feb	Hunslet	13	Bramley	0
25 Feb	Leigh	6	Huddersfield	10
25 Feb	Rochdale Hornets	54	Broughton Moor	2
25 Feb	St Helens Recs	5	Leeds	20
25 Feb	Swinton	24	Hull BOCM	5
25 Feb	Widnes	5	Wigan Highfield	5
25 Feb	Wigan	15	Wakefield Trinity	6
25 Feb	York	2	Hull Kingston Rovers	4
28 Feb	Wigan Highfield	4	Widnes	9

== Second round ==
Date	Team one	Score one	Team two	Score two
11 Mar	Broughton Rangers	11	Featherstone Rovers	5
11 Mar	Hull Kingston Rovers	0	Hull FC	10
11 Mar	Keighley	15	Askam	0
11 Mar	Oldham	9	Huddersfield	5
11 Mar	Rochdale Hornets	15	Leeds	7
11 Mar	Swinton	0	Dewsbury	3
11 Mar	Widnes	17	Barrow	10
11 Mar	Wigan	52	Hunslet	6

== Quarterfinals ==
Date	Team one	Score one	Team two	Score two
25 Mar	Broughton Rangers	2	Widnes	2
25 Mar	Dewsbury	4	Hull FC	9
25 Mar	Rochdale Hornets	5	Oldham	2
25 Mar	Wigan	45	Keighley	0
29 Mar	Widnes	3	Broughton Rangers	2

== Semifinals ==
Date	Team one	Score one	Team two	Score two
08 Apr	Hull FC	18	Wigan	5
08 Apr	Rochdale Hornets	23	Widnes	3

== Final ==
The final saw Rochdale Hornets's 10–9 victory over Hull F.C. in the 1921–22 Challenge Cup final at Headingley, Leeds on Saturday 6 May 1922, in front of a crowd of 32,596. This was Rochdale's first Challenge Cup final win in their first, and as of 2017 their only, Challenge Cup Final appearance.

Rochdale Hornets: 10

Rochdale Hornets Tries: Tommy Fitton 2

Rochdale Hornets Goals: Dicky Paddon 2

Hull: 9

Hull Tries: Jimmy Kennedy, Billy Batten, Bob Taylor

Half-time: 6-7

Attendance: 34,827 (at Headingley, Leeds)

Rochdale Hornets: Frank Prescott, Tommy Fitton, Fred Wild, Teddy McLoughlin, Joe Corsi, John Heaton, J. Keynon, Thomas Harris, Jack Bennett, Dickie Paddon, Tommy Woods, Dai Edwards, Louis Corsi

Hull: J. Holdsworth, Billy Stone (c), Jimmy Kennedy, Billy Batten, Emlyn Gwynne, Eddie Caswell, W. J. Charles, Jack Beasty, George Oliver, J. E. Wyburn, Edgar Morgan, Bob Taylor, H. Garratt
