= Billy Holder =

GB & England international rugby league footballer

Personal information
- Full name: William Holder
- Born: unknown
- Died: 22 August 1941 Hull, England

Playing information

Rugby union
Club
Years	Team	Pld	T	G	FG	P
≤1907–07	Gloucester RFC

Rugby league
- Position: Forward
Club
Years	Team	Pld	T	G	FG	P
1907–18	Hull F.C.
Representative
Years	Team	Pld	T	G	FG	P
1908	England	1	0	0	0	0
1908	Great Britain	1	0	0	0	0

William Holder (birth ~1886 – 22 August 1941) was an English rugby union, and professional rugby league footballer who played in the 1900s and 1910s. He played club level rugby union (RU) for Gloucester RFC, and representative level rugby league (RL) for Great Britain and England, and at club level for Hull F.C., as a forward.

== Playing career ==
=== Hull ===
Originally a rugby union player, Holder switched to rugby league in August 1907, signing for Hull.

Holder played as a forward, in Hull's 0–14 defeat by Hunslet in the 1907–08 Challenge Cup Final during the 1907–08 season at Fartown Ground, Huddersfield on Saturday 25 April 1908, in front of a crowd of 18,000, played as a forward in the 0–17 defeat by Wakefield Trinity in the 1908–09 Challenge Cup Final during the 1908–09 season at Headingley, Leeds on Saturday 24 April 1909, in front of a crowd of 23,587. played as a forward in the 7–7 draw with Leeds in the 1909–10 Challenge Cup Final during the 1909–10 season at Fartown Ground, Huddersfield, on Saturday 16 April 1910, in front of a crowd of 19,413, this was the first Challenge Cup Final to be drawn, played as a forward in the 12–26 defeat by Leeds in the 1909–10 Challenge Cup Final replay at Fartown Ground, Huddersfield, on Monday 18 April 1910, in front of a crowd of 11,608, and played as a forward in the 6–0 victory over Wakefield Trinity in the 1913–14 Challenge Cup Final during the 1913–14 season at Thrum Hall, Halifax, in front of a crowd of 19,000.

Testimonial matches at Hull F.C. were shared with; Jim Devereux, Tom Herridge, William Holder, and Ned Rogers, and took place against Keighley at The Boulevard, Hull on Saturday 29 January 1921, and against York at The Boulevard, Hull on Saturday 12 February 1921.

=== International honours ===
Bill Holder won a cap for England while at Hull in 1908 against Wales, and won a cap for Great Britain while at Hull in 1908 against New Zealand.

== Post-playing career ==
After retiring from rugby, Holder worked for a local shipping company, Ellerman's Wilson Line. He died on 22 August 1941.
