= Ellis Clarkson =

England international rugby league footballer

Personal information
- Born: 1887 Leigh, Lancashire
- Died: October 1947 (aged 59–60)

Playing information
- Position: Fullback
Club
Years	Team	Pld	T	G	FG	P
1904–10	Leigh	214	10	52	0	134
1910–13	Hull F.C.	91	1	3
1913–19	Leigh
	Total	305	11	55	0	134
Representative
Years	Team	Pld	T	G	FG	P
≥1910–≤13	Lancashire
≥1910–≤13	Rugby League XIII	2
1910–12	England	3	0	0	0	0

Ellis Clarkson (1887 – October 1947) was an English professional rugby league footballer who played in the 1900s and 1910s. He played at representative level for England, Rugby League XIII and Lancashire, and at club level for Leigh (two spells) and Hull F.C., as a goal-kicking fullback.

== Playing career ==
=== Club career ===
Clarkson started his career with Leigh in 1904 and helped them win the League championship in the 1905–06 season.

He joined Hull F.C. in 1910, spending three seasons at the club. His final game for Hull was a 3–17 defeat against Batley in the 1912 Yorkshire Cup final. He returned to Leigh in 1913.

He last played for Leigh in the 1918–19 season before being forced to retire due to a knee injury. He made 214 appearances during his two spells at Leigh.

=== Representative honours ===
Clarkson won caps for England while at Hull in 1910 against Wales, in 1911 against Wales, and in 1912 against Wales.

Clarkson represented Lancashire while at Hull, and is one of only four players to do so, they are; Ellis Clarkson, Bob Taylor, Dick Gemmell and Steve Prescott.

== Personal life ==
Ellis Clarkson was the older brother of the rugby league footballer; Tom Clarkson.
