= Thomas Harris (rugby) =

England international rugby league footballer

Personal information
- Full name: Thomas Henry Harris
- Born: 1896
- Died: 1962 (aged 66)

Playing information

Rugby union
- Position: Forward
Club
Years	Team	Pld	T	G	FG	P
≤1920–20	Redruth R.F.C.
Representative
Years	Team	Pld	T	G	FG	P
≤1920–≤20	Cornwall	7

Rugby league
- Position: Prop
Club
Years	Team	Pld	T	G	FG	P
1920–≥24	Rochdale Hornets
Representative
Years	Team	Pld	T	G	FG	P
1924	England	1	0	0	0	0

Thomas Henry Harris (1896 – 1962) was an English rugby union, and professional rugby league footballer who played in the 1910s and 1920s. He played representative level rugby union for Cornwall, and at club level for Redruth R.F.C., as a forward, and representative level rugby league for England, and at club level for Rochdale Hornets, as a prop.

== Playing career ==
=== Club career ===
Harris transferred from Redruth R.F.C. to rugby league club Rochdale Hornets on 30 November 1920, for a signing-on fee of £300.

Harris played at prop in Rochdale Hornets' 10–9 victory over Hull F.C. in the 1922 Challenge Cup Final during the 1921–22 season at Headingley, Leeds on Saturday 6 May 1922, in front of a crowd of 32,596.

=== Representative honours ===
Harris won a cap for England in rugby league while at Rochdale Hornets in 1924 against Other Nationalities.

Harris represented Cornwall in rugby union while at Redruth RFC.
