= Emlyn Gwynne =

GB & Wales international rugby league footballer

Personal information
- Full name: Thomas Emlyn Gwynne
- Born: fourth ¼ 1898; Llanelli, Wales
- Died: fourth ¼ 1962 (aged 63); West Glamorgan, Wales

Playing information

Rugby union
Club
Years	Team	Pld	T	G	FG	P
	Mountain Ash RFC
	Swansea RFC
	Total	0	0	0	0	0

Rugby league
- Position: Wing
Club
Years	Team	Pld	T	G	FG	P
1921–31	Hull FC
Representative
Years	Team	Pld	T	G	FG	P
1927	Glamorgan	≥1
1928	Wales	1
1928–29	Great Britain	3	0	0	0	0

Thomas Emlyn Gwynne (fourth ¼ 1898 – fourth ¼ 1962) was a Welsh rugby union and professional rugby league footballer who played in the 1920s and 1930s. He played club level rugby union (RU) for Mountain Ash RFC and Swansea RFC, and representative level rugby league (RL) for both Great Britain, Wales and Glamorgan, and at club level for Hull FC, as a wing.

== Background ==
Emlyn Gwynne's birth was registered in Llanelli, Wales, and his death aged 63 was registered in West Glamorgan, Wales.

== Playing career ==
=== International honours ===
Emlyn Gwynne won a cap for Wales (RL) while at Hull in the 15–39 defeat by England at White City Stadium, Sloper Road, Grangetown, Cardiff on Wednesday 14 November 1928, and won caps for Great Britain (RL) while at Hull in 1928 against Australia, and New Zealand, and in 1929 against Australia.

=== County honours ===
Emlyn Gwynne played on the wing and scored a try in Glamorgan's 18–14 victory over Monmouthshire in the non-County Championship match during the 1926–27 season at Taff Vale Park, Pontypridd on Saturday 30 April 1927.

=== Challenge Cup Final appearances ===
Emlyn Gwynne played on the wing in Hull FC's 9–10 defeat by Rochdale Hornets in the 1922 Challenge Cup Final during the 1921–22 season at Headingley, Leeds, in front of a crowd of 34,827.
