= Jack Tindall =

English footballer

Personal information
- Full name: Thomas Jackson Tindall
- Date of birth: 12 May 1891
- Place of birth: Barnsley, England
- Date of death: 1971 (aged 79–80)
- Height: 5 ft 8 in (1.73 m)
- Position: Full-back

Senior career*
| Years | Team | Apps | (Gls) |
| 1910–1913 | St Barnabas (Barnsley) | | |
| 1913–1923 | Barnsley | 138 | (0) |
| 1924–1925 | Accrington Stanley | 12 | (0) |
| 1925 | Shirebrook | | |
| Total | | 150 | (0) |
- * Club domestic league appearances and goals

Thomas Jackson Tindall (12 May 1891 – 1971) was an English footballer who played in the Football League for Accrington Stanley and Barnsley.
