= Edgar Morgan (rugby, born 1896) =

GB & Wales international rugby league & union player

- Born: David Edgar Morgan; 17 May 1896 Llanelli, Wales
- Died: 9 September 1983 (aged 87) Llanelli, Wales
- School: Park Street School

Rugby union career
- Position: Forward
Amateur team(s)
Years	Team	Apps	(Points)
- New Dock Stars RFC
- Llanelli RFC
International career
Years	Team	Apps	(Points)
1920–21	Wales	4	(0)
- Rugby league career

Playing information
- Position: Second-row
Club
Years	Team	Pld	T	G	FG	P
1921–26	Hull FC
Representative
Years	Team	Pld	T	G	FG	P
1921–26	Wales	5				6
1921	Great Britain	2				0

David Edgar Morgan (17 May 1896 – 9 September 1983)) was a Welsh dual-code international rugby union, and professional rugby league footballer who played in the 1910s and 1920s. He played representative level rugby union (RU) for Wales, and at club level for New Dock Stars RFC and Llanelli RFC, as a forward, and representative level rugby league (RL) for Great Britain and Wales, and at club level for Hull FC, as a second-row.

== Playing career ==
=== Rugby union career ===
Morgan joined first class Welsh team, Llanelli RFC, from New Dock Stars RFC. From Llanelli, Morgan was first selected to represent the Wales national team in 1920, a home game at the Cardiff Arms Park against Ireland, as part of the 1920 Five Nations Championship. Wales won the game, the last of the campaign, by a large margin. The following season Morgan was reselected for the 1921 Championship, and played in the first three games; losses to England and Scotland, and his last union international appearance a win over France.

During the mid-season break, Morgan was elected to become Llanelli's captain for the forthcoming 1921/22 season. He was unable to accept the role as during the same period he signed professional papers to join rugby league team Hull, the position going to his vice-captain Albert Jenkins. As Morgan was one of several players to switch to league during the period, he was interviewed by the Welsh Rugby Union to discover the reason for his move to professional rugby. Morgan responded that it was purely financial as he had been out of work for several months. Morgan was captain of Hull during the 1923–24 season.

=== International honours ===
Morgan won caps for Great Britain while at Hull in 1921 against Australia (2 matches).

=== Challenge Cup Final appearances ===
Morgan played at second-row in Hull FC's 9–10 defeat by Rochdale Hornets in the 1922 Challenge Cup final during the 1921–22 season at Headingley, Leeds, in front of a crowd of 34,827.

== Bibliography ==
- Gate, Robert (1986). Gone North: Volume 1. Ripponden: R.E. Gate. ISBN 0-9511190-0-1.
- Hughes, Gareth (1986). The Scarlets: A History of Llanelli Rugby Club. Llanelli: Llanelli Borough Council. ISBN 0-906821-05-3.
