= John Campbell (rugby) =

Australian rugby union and rugby league footballer

- Born: John Dennison Campbell; 22 July 1889 Penrith, New South Wales
- Died: 30 August 1966 (aged 77) Harbord, New South Wales

Rugby union career
- Position: Centre
International career
Years	Team	Apps	(Points)
1910	Wallabies	3	(0)
- Rugby league career

Playing information
Club
Years	Team	Pld	T	G	FG	P
1910–12	Easts
1912–1921	Leeds	258				414
1921	Easts
	Total	258	0	0	0	414

John Dennison 'Dinny' Campbell (22 July 1889 – 30 August 1966) was a national representative for Australia in rugby union before switching codes and playing rugby league for the Eastern Suburbs club during the 1910–12 and 1921 seasons.

== Rugby & Rugby league career ==
Campbell was born in Penrith, New South Wales. He played in the centre position in rugby union, claiming a total of 3 international rugby caps for Australia.

He switched to the professional code of rugby league football, playing for Eastern Suburbs. He played centre, or five-eighth for Eastern Suburbs. Campbell played alongside Dally Messenger in Easts first premiership winning sides. He was also a representative of New South Wales (NSW) in matches against Queensland, and New Zealand in the 1911 and '12 seasons. He returned and played one last season with Easts in 1921.

Campbell in 1911 landed the Sydney first grade competition's first and only ever recorded instance of a "field goal" that was included under the first laws of the game. Playing for Eastern Suburbs against Newtown a loose ball in open play was kicked by Campbell over the cross-bar, counting as a field goal.

== English career ==
At the end of the 1912 season he moved to England, where he enjoyed 9 very successful seasons - scoring 136 tries. In 1921 Campbell returned to Australia, where he linked with his former club, Eastern Suburbs, for one final season. Campbell later went on to become a talent scout for the Eastern suburbs. Campbell made his début for Leeds against Keighley at Headingley, Leeds on Saturday 14 September 1912. Campbell played at centre in Leeds' 2–35 defeat by Huddersfield in the Championship Final during the 1914–15 season.
