= Eddie Caswell =

Welsh RL coach and former Wales international rugby league footballer

- Full name: Edwin Alfred Caswell
- Born: c. 1895 Cefn Cribwr, Wales
- Died: 22 May 1949 (aged 54) Hull, England

Rugby union career
Senior career
Years	Team	Apps	(Points)
- Bridgend RFC
- Cardiff RFC
- Rugby league career

Playing information
- Position: Stand-off
Club
Years	Team	Pld	T	G	FG	P
1919–≥27	Hull FC
Representative
Years	Team	Pld	T	G	FG	P
1922–27	Wales	3	1	0	0	3

Coaching information
Club
Years	Team	Gms	W	D	L	W%
1931–46	Hull FC

Edwin Alfred "Eddie" Caswell (c. 1895 – 22 May 1949) was a Welsh professional rugby league footballer who played in the 1920s, and coached in the 1930s and 1940s. He played at representative level for Wales, and at club level for Hull FC, as a stand-off, and was captain of Hull during the 1925–26, 1926–27 and 1927–28 seasons, and coached at club level for Hull.

== Playing career ==
=== Rugby union ===
Born in Cefn Cribwr, Caswell began playing rugby union for Bridgend and Cardiff. In October 1919, he switched to rugby league, joining Hull.

=== Rugby league ===
Caswell played stand-off in Hull's 9-10 defeat by Rochdale Hornets in the 1922 Challenge Cup Final during the 1921–22 season at Headingley, Leeds, in front of a crowd of 34,827.

Caswell won caps for Wales while at Hull 1922…1927 3-caps.

== Coaching career ==
After retiring as a player, Caswell remained at Hull as a trainer. On 22 May 1949, he died after collapsing in an office at Hull's ground, The Boulevard.
