= Bob Taylor (rugby league) =

GB & England international rugby league footballer

- Ogden's Cigarette card featuring Bob Taylor

Personal information
- Full name: Robert Taylor
- Born: c. 1892 Barrow-in-Furness, England
- Died: 16 May 1961 (aged 69) Hull, England

Playing information
- Position: Second-row
Club
Years	Team	Pld	T	G	FG	P
1909–20	Barrow	56
1920–30	Hull F.C.	308	164
1930–≥30	Barrow
	Total	364	164	0	0	0
Representative
Years	Team	Pld	T	G	FG	P
≥1920–≤30	Lancashire
1921–26	England	7	7	0	0	21
1921–22	Great Britain	2	2	0	0	6

Robert "Bob" Taylor (c. 1892 – 16 May 1961) was an English professional rugby league footballer who played in the 1910s, 1920s and 1930s. He played at representative level for Great Britain, England and Lancashire, and at club level for Barrow (two spells) and Hull F.C., as a second-row.

== Background ==
Bob Taylor was born on the Furness peninsula, Lancashire, England.

== Playing career ==
=== Club career ===
Taylor debuted for Barrow in December 1909, making 56 appearances for the club before the outbreak of the First World War.

When the war ended, Taylor signed for Hull F.C. In January 1921, he scored six tries for Hull in a match against Wakefield Trinity.

Taylor played at second-row and scored a try in Hull's 9–10 defeat by Rochdale Hornets in the 1922 Challenge Cup Final during the 1921–22 season at Headingley, Leeds, in front of a crowd of 34,827. Hull F.C. were just one-point behind Rochdale Hornets when second-row Bob Taylor scored a try in the dying minutes, however fullback Billy Stone was unable to score the conversion and Rochdale Hornets won the 1922 Challenge Cup.

Bob Taylor scored 32 tries in 35 appearances during the 1925–26 season, this was the "most tries scored in a Rugby Football League season by a forward" record, until this was extended to 40 tries by Bob Haigh of Leeds during the 1970–71 season.

=== Representative honours ===
Taylor won caps for England while at Hull in 1921 against Australia, in 1922 against Wales, in 1923 against Wales, in 1925 against Wales (2 matches), and in 1926 against Wales, and Other Nationalities, and won caps for Great Britain while at Hull in 1921–22 against Australia, and in 1926–27 against New Zealand.

Taylor represented Lancashire while at Hull, and is one of only four players to do so, they are; Ellis Clarkson, Bob Taylor, Dick Gemmell and Steve Prescott.

== Personal life ==
Bob Taylor was the father of the rugby league footballer who played in the 1940s for Hull F.C.; Robert "Bob" Taylor, and the rugby league footballer who played for Hull F.C. (A-Team); Fred Taylor.
