= 1909–10 Northern Rugby Football Union season =

- League: Championship
- Teams: 28

1908–09 Season
- Champions: Oldham (2nd title)
- League Leaders: Oldham
- Runners-up: Wigan
- Top point-scorer: (England) Jim Leytham ( Wigan) (232)
- Top try-scorer: (England) Jim Leytham ( Wigan) (48)
- Resigned from the League: Aberdare; Barry; Mid-Rhondda

The 1909–10 Northern Rugby Football Union season was the 15th season of rugby league football.

== Season summary ==
Aberdare, Barry and Mid-Rhondda had dropped out, leaving 28 teams.

Oldham won their second Championship this season. After finishing top of the regular season table, they went on to beat Wigan 13–7 in the play-off final.

The Challenge Cup Winners were Leeds who defeated Hull F.C. 26–12 in replay after a 7–7 draw.

At the close of the season, the Northern Union's leading players were selected to go on the 1910 Great Britain Lions tour of Australia and New Zealand.

Oldham won the Lancashire League, and Wakefield Trinity won the Yorkshire League. Wigan beat Leigh 22–5 to win the Lancashire Cup, and Huddersfield beat Batley 21–0 to win the Yorkshire County Cup.

== Championship ==
	Team	Pld	W	D	L	PF	PA	Pts	Pct
1	Oldham	34	29	2	3	604	184	60	88.23
2	Salford	31	24	1	6	387	210	49	79.03
3	Wigan	30	23	1	6	545	169	47	78.33
4	Wakefield	32	24	0	8	435	242	48	75.33
5	Keighley	28	19	0	9	382	242	38	67.85
6	Leeds	34	21	1	12	451	317	43	63.26
7	Warrington	34	20	2	12	408	252	42	61.76
8	Huddersfield	34	21	0	13	477	301	42	61.76
9	Halifax	34	21	0	13	395	269	42	61.76
10	St. Helens	31	18	2	11	468	367	38	61.29
11	Hull Kingston Rovers	35	19	1	15	410	376	39	55.71
12	Leigh	32	15	5	12	218	206	35	54.68
13	Hull	36	19	0	17	456	373	38	52.77
14	Batley	33	16	2	15	313	201	34	51.51
15	Hunslet	32	16	0	16	321	347	32	50
16	Runcorn	30	14	1	15	232	317	29	48.33
17	Ebbw Vale	24	9	2	13	156	211	20	41.66
18	Widnes	28	10	3	15	152	244	23	41.07
19	Rochdale Hornets	32	13	0	19	272	371	26	40.62
20	Dewsbury	30	11	1	18	253	338	23	38.33
21	Swinton	30	10	2	18	203	306	22	36.66
22	Broughton Rangers	34	10	2	22	295	498	22	32.35
23	Bradford Northern	34	9	1	24	176	388	19	27.94
24	York	30	6	1	23	269	473	13	21.66
25	Bramley	29	6	0	23	181	532	12	20.68
26	Barrow	28	5	1	22	146	377	11	19.64
27	Merthyr Tydfil	21	2	1	18	94	354	5	11.9
28	Treherbert	12	0	0	12	55	289	0	0

== Championship play-off ==
Semi-finals
1	Oldham	12
4	Wakefield Trinity	6
2	Salford	6
3	Wigan	17

Championship final
Oldham	13
Wigan	7

== Challenge Cup ==
Leeds played Hull in the Challenge Cup Final the match ended in a 7–7 draw. The replay resulted in Leeds defeating Hull 26–12. This was Leeds' first Cup Final win in their first Cup Final appearance. Hull lost their third Cup Final in a row.

First match

Leeds: 7

Leeds Tries: Walter Goldthorpe

Leeds Goals: Frank Young 2

Hull FC: 7

Hull FC Tries: G. T. Cottrell

Hull FC Goals: (E. or Ned) Rogers, Harry Wallace

Half-time: 2–7

Attendance: 19,413 (at Fartown Ground, Huddersfield)

Teams:

Hull FC: Harry Taylor, G. T. Cottrell, Jim Devereux, Andy Morton, (E. or Ned) Rogers, Harry Wallace, Billie Anderson, Tom Herridge, Will Osborne, Dick Taylor, William Holder, G. Connell, H. Walton

Leeds: Frank Young, J. Fawcett, Walter Goldthorpe, C. Gillie, F. Barron, E. Ware, J. Sanders, W. Biggs, Billy Jarman, Fred Harrison, Harry Topham, Fred Webster, Billy Ward

Replay

Leeds: 26

Leeds Tries: Rowe, Walter Goldthorpe, Fred Webster, Harry Topham

Leeds Goals: Frank Young 7

Hull FC: 12

Hull FC Tries: G. Connell, H. Walton

Hull FC Goals: (E. or Ned) Rogers 3

Half-time: 16–0

Attendance: 11,608 (at Fartown Ground, Huddersfield)

Teams:

Leeds: Frank Young, Harold Rowe, Walter Goldthorpe, C. Gillie, F. Barron, E. Ware, J. Fawcett, Fred Webster, Fred Harrison, Harry Topham, Billy Ward, Billy Jarman, S. Whittaker

Hull FC: E. Rogers, G. T. Cottrell, Jim Devereux, Andy Morton, Ernest Atkinson, (G. or Ned) Rogers, Harry Wallace, Tom Herridge, Will Osborne, Dick Taylor, William Holder, G. Connell, H. Walton

== Sources ==
- 1909-10 Rugby Football League season at wigan.rlfans.com
- The Challenge Cup at The Rugby Football League website
