= Fartown Ground =

Sports ground in Huddersfield, West Yorkshire, England

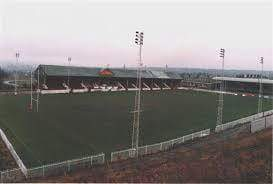
- Interactive map of Fartown Ground
- Full name: Fartown Ground
- Former names: St John's Ground
- Location: Fartown, Huddersfield
- Coordinates: 53°39′46″N 1°47′4″W
- Capacity: 5,000 (reduced from 36,000 and 28,000 in its later years)
- Surface: Grass
- Record attendance: 35,136 Challenge Cup Semi Final 19 April 1947

Construction
- Built: 1878
- Closed: 1992

Tenant
- Huddersfield RLFC (1878–1992)

The Fartown Ground or just simply Fartown is a sports ground located in the Huddersfield suburb of Fartown in West Yorkshire, England and is predominantly famous for being the home ground of Huddersfield Rugby League Club from 1878 to 1992. The grounds consisted of a rugby ground, a cricket ground used by Yorkshire County Cricket Club, Bowling greens and a running track as well as a pavilion. It was the scene of many great games, including the Challenge Cup finals of 1908 and 1910, several Challenge Cup semi finals, John Player Cup finals and international matches.

Although the stands were all demolished, the pitch, floodlights and bankings where the terraces once stood are still there, Huddersfield RLFC played their last game there on 23 August 1992, up until the mid 2000s the club's junior and reserves sides still played on the pitch at Fartown but the stands were already demolished by then. The ground had fallen into serious decline in the 1980s, The Main stand was closed in 1986 due to safety issues after the Bradford City stadium fire in 1985 and partly reopened in 1989, a large chunk of the terrace side was condemned and never reopened, the supporters club building was demolished in 2009 after a fire.

It also hosted an FA Cup semi final game between Blackburn Rovers and Sheffield Wednesday in 1882.

Huddersfield are still known as "Fartown" or "the Fartowners" by many of their older supporters. The highest attendance at the stadium to watch a Huddersfield game was 32,912 against Wigan on 4 March 1950, although a Challenge Cup semi-final played 19 April 1947 attracted a crowd of 35,136.

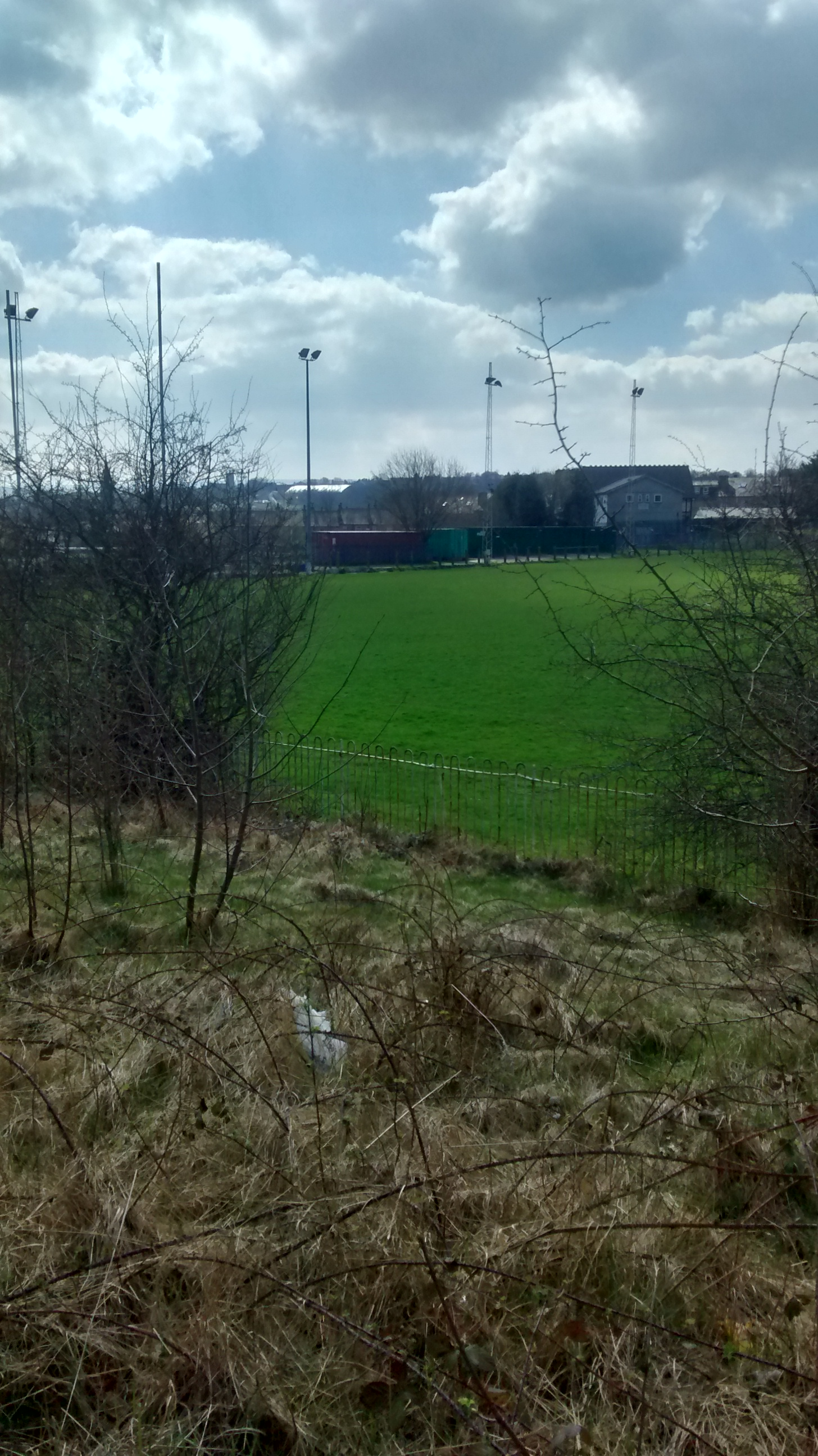
Looking at the Main stand side from Richmond Avenue/Scoreboard end in 2015

== History ==
The ground was originally known as the St John's Ground, after Huddersfield St John's Cricket Club who became its original occupants in 1868, the ground had previously been owned by the proprietor of the George Hotel in Huddersfield.

In 1875 St John's Cricket Club merged with Huddersfield Athletic Club to form the Huddersfield Cricket and Athletic Club. The name of the stadium was also changed to Fartown Grounds.

Although the athletic club had formed a rugby football section in 1867, Fartown was initially used for athletics festivals alterations made in the summer of 1878 meant that rugby could begin at the start of the 1878–79 season with the visit of Manchester Rangers on 2 November. The venue quickly became synonymous with Huddersfield RLFC.

Senior football was played at Fartown just once, an FA Cup semi final in 1882, organised as part of an attempt by the Football Association to promote the game of association football in what was, at the time, a predominantly rugby focused town. Blackburn Rovers drew 0–0 with Sheffield Wednesday, forcing a replay at Fallowfield in Manchester. Blackburn eventually won 5–1, and went on to lose 1–0 in the final to Old Etonians.

On 10 April 1882 (Easter Monday), the North of England v South of England men's Lacrosse match was played at the Fartown ground, with the North winning 2–0, "in the presence of a large number of spectators". (see match report: 'Athletic News' 12 April 1882).

The Challenge Cup finals of 1908 and 1910 were played at Fartown with a replay at the ground required in 1910.

On 11 August 1943 an exhibition baseball game was staged between two teams of American soldiers which attracted 2,400 curious spectators.

In March 1973 the ground hosted its first John Player Trophy final, 10,102 spectators saw Leeds beat Salford 12–7. Leeds would feature in 2 semi finals a decade later, in December 1982, Leeds beat Widnes 8–2 in front of 7,247 fans and a year later the Loiners would beat Leigh 18–11 in front of 5,740 fans in what was the ground's last major fixture.

The ground hosted its last Challenge Cup semi final in April 1976 when St Helens narrowly beat Keighley 5–4 in front of a crowd of 9,829.

The 1980s saw the stadium decline rapidly as Huddersfield RLFC struggled to pull in spectators. The main stand was closed due to storm damage in 1986. A new board of directors took over in 1989 when and injected some much needed financial resources into the club. As well as beginning to improve the playing staff, the new owners also carried out a considerable amount of work on the Fartown stadium and by the end of the 1989–90 season significant progress was being made.

Huddersfield RLFC moved to Huddersfield Town F.C.'s Leeds Road stadium in 1992, and then to the McAlpine Stadium in 1994, although they continued to use Fartown as a training base until 2004. The ground is now rather dilapidated, and is only used for staging amateur rugby league games.

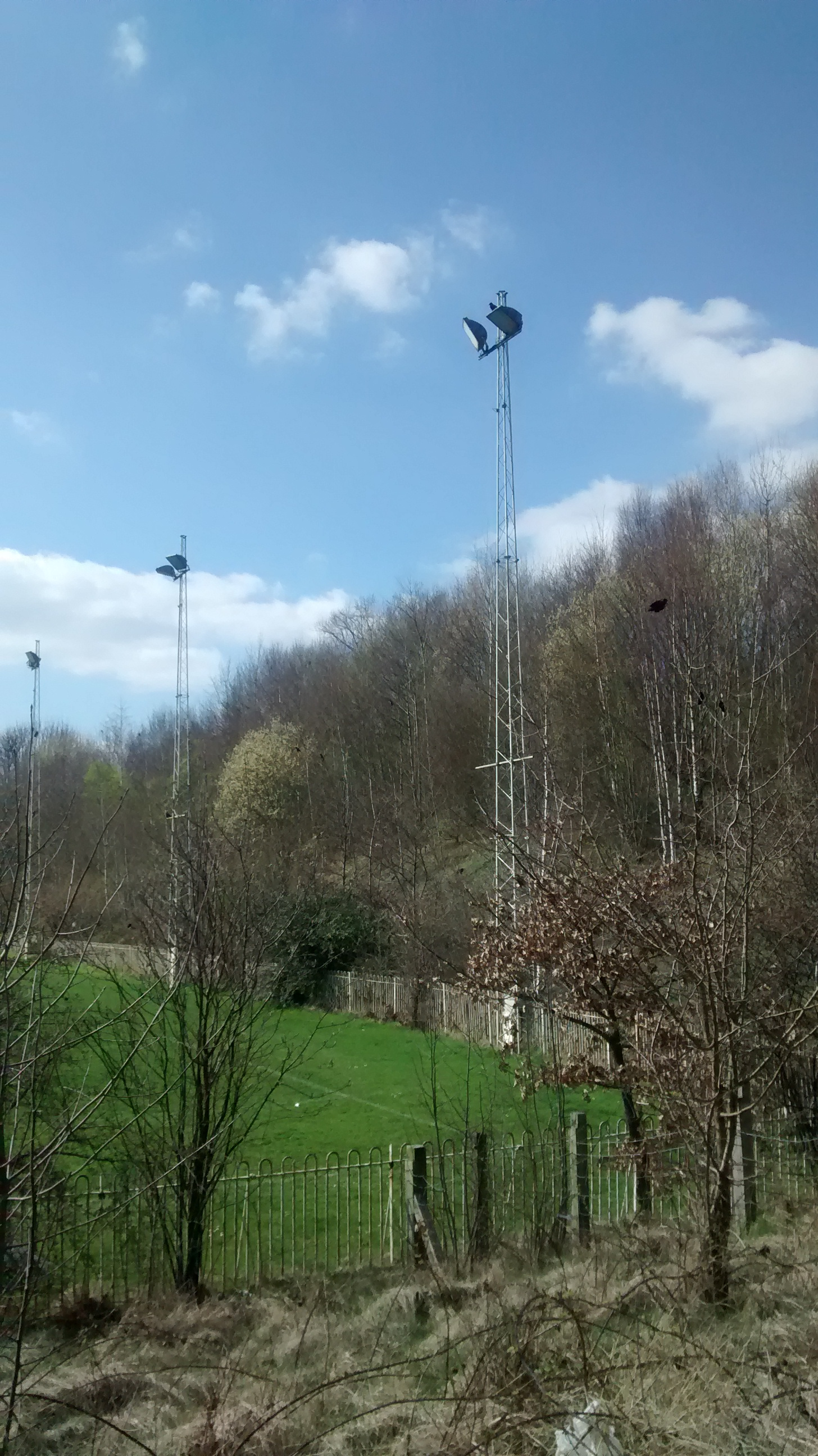
Looking onto the terrace side from Richmond Avenue/Scoreboard end in 2015

== Cricket ==
The rugby ground was adjoined by a cricket field, once considered to be the finest wicket in Yorkshire. A total of 76 first-class and 9 list A one-day matches were played on the pitch, the first on 28 August 1873 when Yorkshire played Nottinghamshire, and the last on 17 August 1955, when Yorkshire defeated Gloucestershire by 67 runs.

Yorkshire also played games against the touring Australians and South Africans at Fartown and an England XI played the Australians there in 1884. The first county one day game played there was held on 1 June 1969 in the Player's County League against Sussex while the last came on 9 May 1982 in the John Player League when Yorkshire played Worcestershire.

Yorkshire's highest score at Fartown was the 579 for 6 declared they accumulated against Glamorgan in 1925 while Middlesex scored 527 in 1887. Worcestershire were dismissed for 24 in 1903 while Yorkshire were humiliated for 31 by Essex in 1935. AJ Webbe scored an unbeaten 243 in Middlesex's run spree in 1887 while the prolific Percy Holmes scored 220 not out for the Tykes against Warwickshire in 1922. A.W. Mold took 9 for 41 for Lancashire in a Roses Match in 1890 while CT Spencer took 9 for 63 for Leicestershire in 1954.

== Rugby League Test Matches ==
The list of international rugby league matches played at Fartown is.

Game#	Date	Result	Attendance	Notes
1	1 November 1923	England def. Wales 18–11	11,066	
2	18 March 1931	England def. Wales 23–18	6,000	
3	18 December 1937	Australia def. (United Kingdom) The Lions 13–3	9,403	1937–38 Kangaroo tour
4	25 October 1947	England def. France 20–15	14,175	1947–48 European Rugby League Championship
5	18 October 1952	Other nationalities def. England 31–12	20,459	1952–53 European Rugby League Championship

== Rugby League Tour Matches ==
Fartown also saw Huddersfield, the county team Yorkshire and a Northern Rugby Football Union select side play host to international touring teams from Australia (sometimes playing as Australasia) and New Zealand from 1907 to 1973.

Game	Date	Result	Attendance	Notes
1	12 October 1907	New Zealand def. Huddersfield 19–8	10,000	1907–08 All Golds tour
2	12 October 1908	Northern Union XIII def. Australia 14–9	7,000	1908–09 Kangaroo tour
3	20 February 1909	Huddersfield def. Australia 5–3	9,700	1908–09 Kangaroo tour
4	2 December 1911	Huddersfield def. Australasia 21–7	17,000	1911–12 Kangaroo tour
5	19 November 1921	Australasia def. Huddersfield 36–2	12,000	1921–22 Kangaroo tour
6	6 November 1926	Huddersfield def. New Zealand 12–10	5,000	1926–27 New Zealand Kiwis tour
7	15 December 1926	Yorkshire def. New Zealand 17–16	3,000	1926–27 New Zealand Kiwis tour
8	12 October 1929	Australia def. Huddersfield 18–8	18,560	1929–30 Kangaroo tour
9	18 November 1933	Australia def. Huddersfield 13–5	7,522	1933–34 Kangaroo tour
10	20 November 1937	Huddersfield def. Australia 17–7	9,383	1937–38 Kangaroo tour
11	22 November 1947	Huddersfield def. New Zealand 12–7	8,872	1947–48 New Zealand Kiwis tour
12	18 September 1948	Huddersfield def. Australia 22–3	26,017	1948–49 Kangaroo tour
13	10 October 1951	New Zealand def. Huddersfield 34–12	9,859	1951–52 New Zealand Kiwis tour
14	1 November 1952	Australia def. Huddersfield 27–9	25,494	1952–53 Kangaroo tour
15	26 November 1952	Australia def. Yorkshire 55–11	3,737	1952–53 Kangaroo tour
16	10 November 1956	Australia def. Huddersfield 20–10	12,127	1956–57 Kangaroo tour
17	2 December 1959	Australia def. Huddersfield 21–7	2,349	1959–60 Kangaroo tour
18	16 September 1963	Australia def. Huddersfield 6–5	13,398	1963–64 Kangaroo tour
19	10 November 1973	Australia def. Huddersfield 32–2	1,333	1973 Kangaroo tour

Huddersfield also faced Australia in the first game of their 1992 Rugby League World Cup final tour, losing 66–2 at the Leeds Road ground on 9 October 1992.

== Gallery ==
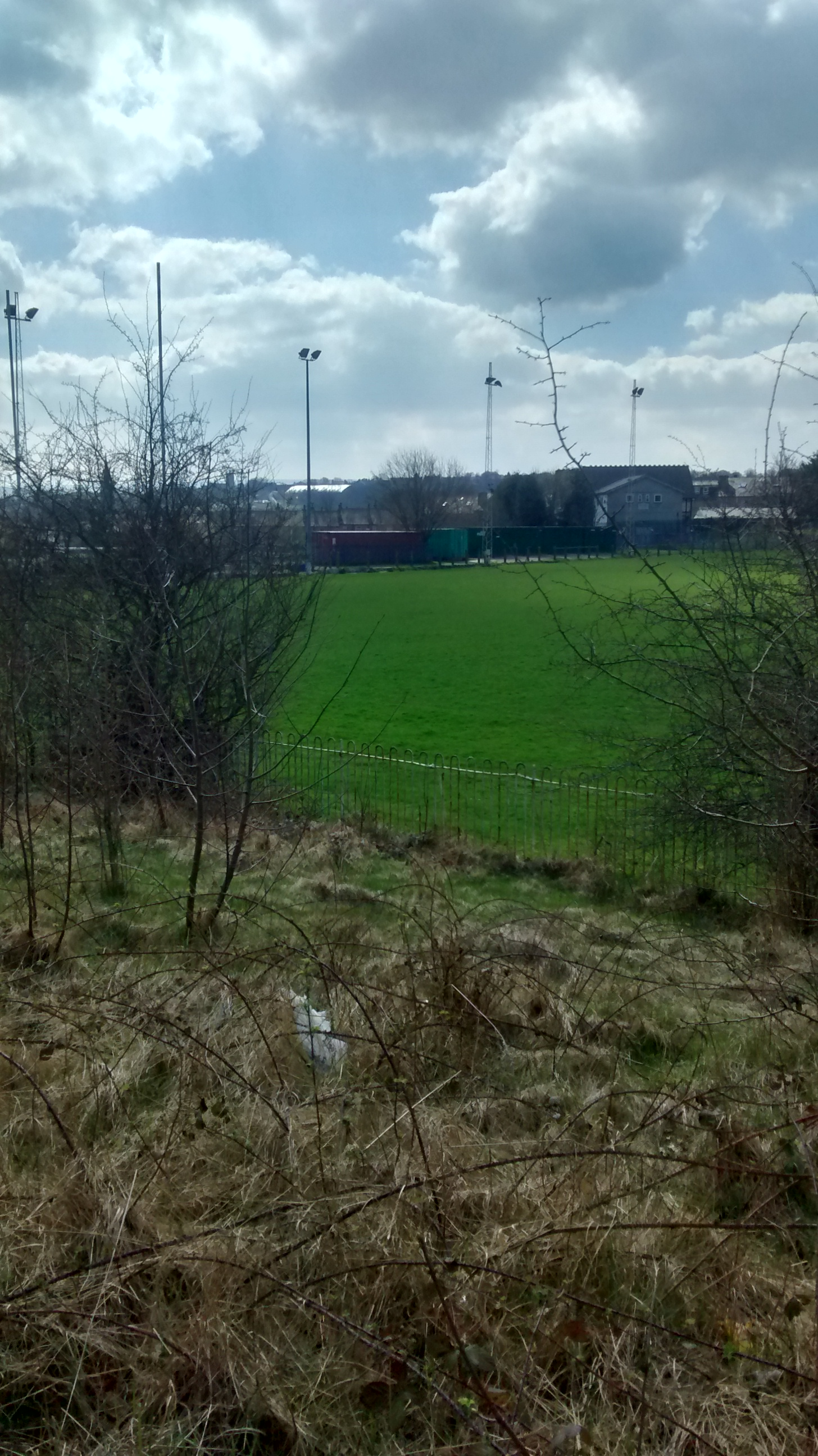
View of the site of the Fartown Stand from the scoreboard end

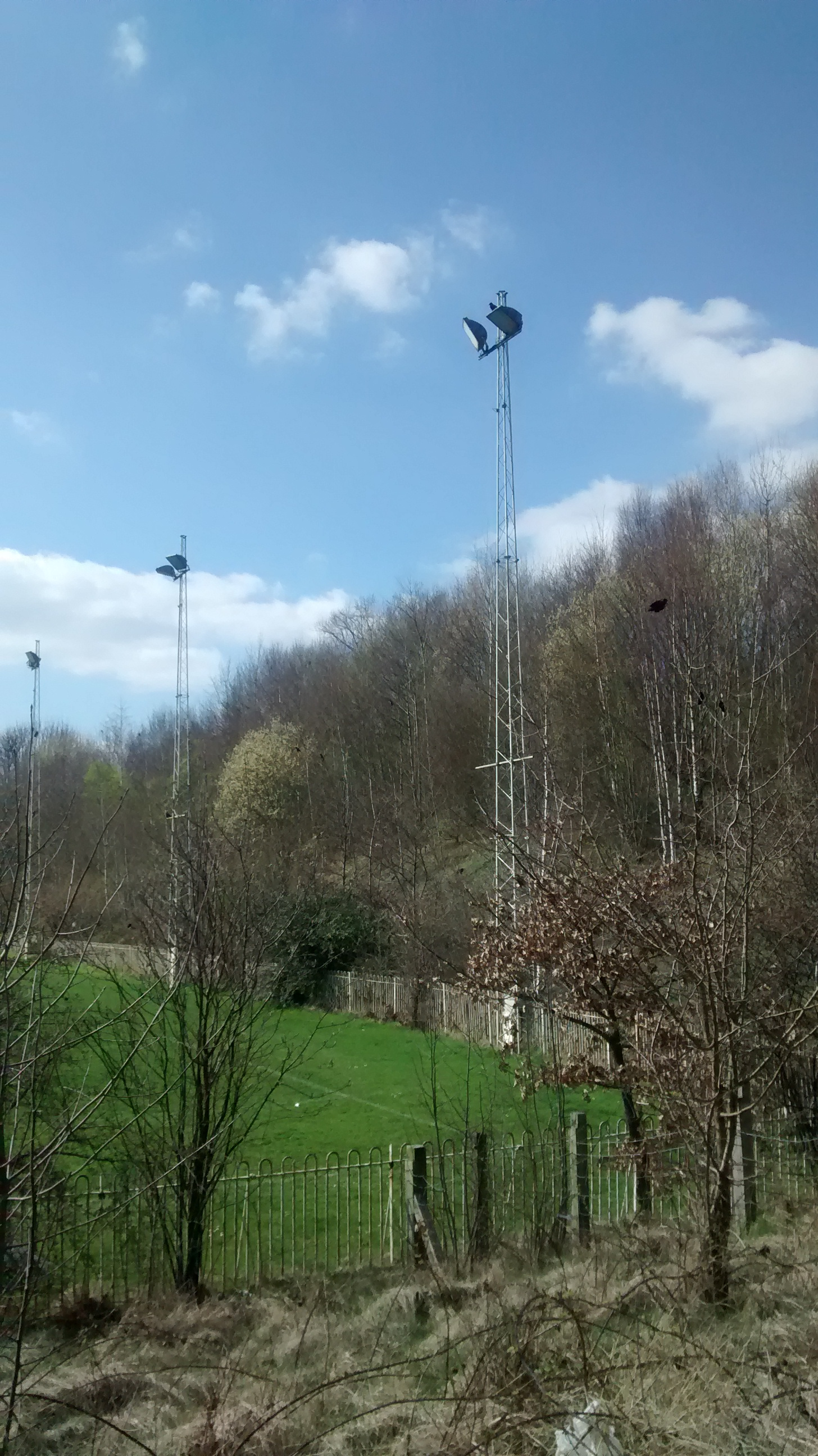
The old terracing at Fartown now long gone and overgrown

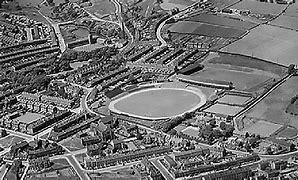
Fartown Cricket and Rugby grounds from 1934 courtesy of "Britain from Above"
