= 1948–49 Yorkshire Cup =

- Structure: Regional knockout championship
- Teams: 16
- Winners: Bradford Northern
- Runners-up: Castleford

1948–49 was the forty-first occasion on which the Yorkshire Cup competition had been held.

Bradford Northern won the trophy by beating Castleford by the score of 18–9

The match was played at Headingley, Leeds, now in West Yorkshire. The attendance was 31,393 and receipts were £5,053

The first of two successive wins for Bradford Northern

== Background ==
This season, junior/amateur clubs Yorkshire Amateurs were again invited to take part and the number of clubs who entered remained at the same as last season's total number of sixteen.

This in turn resulted in no byes in the first round.

The competition again followed the original formula of a knock-out tournament, with the exception of the first round which was still played on a two-legged home and away basis.

== Competition and results ==
=== Round 1 – first leg ===
Involved 8 matches (with no byes) and 16 clubs

All first round ties are played on a two-legged home and away basis

Game No	Fixture date	Home team	Score	Away team	Venue	agg	Att	Rec	Notes	Ref
1	Sat 11 Sep 1948	Castleford	37–7	Bramley	Wheldon Road					
2	Sat 11 Sep 1948	Dewsbury	5–3	Bradford Northern	Crown Flatt					
3	Sat 11 Sep 1948	Huddersfield	79–5	Yorkshire Amateurs	Fartown				(Note: Yorkshire Amateurs were a team from Yorkshire which appeared to have players selected from many both professional and amateur clubs - Yorkshire Amateurs played on many grounds, this year their home match was played at Crown Flatt, the ground of Dewsbury)	
4	Sat 11 Sep 1948	Hull	22–7	Batley	Boulevard					
5	Sat 11 Sep 1948	Keighley	7–8	Hunslet	Lawkholme Lane					
6	Sat 11 Sep 1948	Leeds	10–10	Halifax	Headingley					
7	Sat 11 Sep 1948	Wakefield Trinity	20–5	Hull Kingston Rovers	Belle Vue					
8	Sat 11 Sep 1948	York	12–14	Featherstone Rovers	Clarence Street					

=== Round 1 – second leg ===
Involved 8 matches (with no byes) and 16 clubs

All first round ties are played on a two-legged home and away basis

Game No	Fixture date	Home team	Score	Away team	Venue	agg	Att	Rec	Notes	Ref
1	Wed 15 Sep 1948	Bramley	9–12	Castleford	Barley Mow	16–49				
2	Wed 15 Sep 1948	Bradford Northern	20–5	Dewsbury	Odsal	23–10				
3	Thu 16 Sep 1948	Yorkshire Amateurs	0–61	Huddersfield	Crown Flatt	5–140				
4	Tue 14 Sep 1948	Batley	5–12	Hull	Mount Pleasant	12–34				
5	Wed 15 Sep 1948	Hunslet	9–5	Keighley	Parkside	17–12				
6	Tue 14 Sep 1948	Halifax	5–11	Leeds	Thrum Hall	15–21				
7	Wed 15 Sep 1948	Hull Kingston Rovers	14–4	Wakefield Trinity	Craven Park (1)	19–24				
8	Wed 15 Sep 1948	Featherstone Rovers	17–9	York	Post Office Road	31–21				

=== Round 2 - quarterfinals ===
Involved 4 matches and 8 clubs

All second round ties are played on a knock-out basis

Game No	Fixture date	Home team	Score	Away team	Venue	agg	Att	Rec	Notes	Ref
1	Mon 20 Sep 1948	Bradford Northern	19–12	Huddersfield	Odsal					
2	Mon 27 Sep 1948	Featherstone Rovers	5–19	Wakefield Trinity	Post Office Road					
3	Tue 28 Sep 1948	Castleford	11–0	Hull	Wheldon Road					
4	Thu 30 Sep 1948	Leeds	7–10	Hunslet	Headingley					

=== Round 3 – semifinals ===
Involved 2 matches and 4 clubs

Both semi-final ties are played on a knock-out basis

Game No	Fixture date	Home team	Score	Away team	Venue	agg	Att	Rec	Notes	Ref
1	Wed 13 Oct 1948	Bradford Northern	7–7	Hunslet	Odsal					
2	Wed 13 Oct 1948	Castleford	6–5	Wakefield Trinity	Wheldon Road					

=== Round 3 – semifinals - Replay ===
Involved 2 matches and 4 clubs

Both semi-final ties are played on a knock-out basis

Game No	Fixture date	Home team	Score	Away team	Venue	agg	Att	Rec	Notes	Ref
R	Mon 18 Oct 1948	Hunslet	5–12	Bradford Northern	Parkside					

=== Final ===
Game No	Fixture date	Home team	Score	Away team	Venue	agg	Att	Rec	Notes	Ref
	Saturday 30 October 1948	Bradford Northern	18–9	Castleford	Headingley		31,393	£5,053	(Note: Headingley, Leeds, is the home ground of Leeds RLFC with a capacity of 21,000. The record attendance was 40,175 for a league match between Leeds and Bradford Northern on 21 May 1947.)	

==== Teams and scorers ====
Bradford Northern	№	Castleford
	teams	
George Carmichael	1	Ronald Lewis
Eric Batten	2	Arthur Bastow
William "Bill" Leake	3	Leonard "Len" Skidmore
Ernest Ward (c)	4	Norman Guest
Alan Edwards	5	Reg Lloyd
Willie Davies	6	Arthur Fisher
Donald	7	George Langfield
Frank Whitcombe	8	Dyl Harris
Vic Darlison	9	Jimmy Jones
Ronald "Ron" Greaves	10	James Crossley
Trevor Foster	11	Desmond "Des" Foreman
Barry Tyler	12	Charles Staines
Ken Traill	13	Frank Mugglestone
Dai Rees	Coach	??
18	score	9
2	HT	4
	Scorers	
	Tries	
Allen Edwards (2)	T	Des Foreman (1)
Leake (1)	T	
Foster (1)	T	
	Goals	
Allen Edwards (3)	G	Des Foreman (1)
	G	Charlie Staines (1)
	Drop Goals	
	DG	George Langfield (1)
Referee		G.S.Phillips(Widnes)

Scoring - Try = three (3) points - Goal = two (2) points - Drop goal = two (2) points

=== The road to success ===
All the ties in the first round were played on a two leg (home and away) basis.

For the first round ties, the first club named in each of the ties played the first leg at home.

For the first round ties, the scores shown are the aggregate score over the two legs.

First round
Dewsbury	10
Bradford Northern	23
Huddersfield	140
Batley	5
Leeds	21
Halifax	15
Keighley	12
Hunslet	17
Castleford	49
Bramley	16
Hull	34
Batley	12
York	21
Featherstone Rovers	31
Wakefield Trinity	24
Hull Kingston Rovers	19

Second round
Bradford Northern	19
Huddersfield	12
Leeds	7
Hunslet	10
Castleford	11
Hull	0
Featherstone Rovers	6
Wakefield Trinity	19

Semifinals
Bradford Northern	7 (5)
Hunslet	7 (12)
Castleford	6
Wakefield Trinity	5

Final
Bradford Northern	18
Castleford	9

== See also ==
- 1948–49 Northern Rugby Football League season
- Rugby league county cups
