= Frank Whitcombe =

Welsh rugby union and rugby league footballer and administrator

- Whitcombe tackling in a match in 1948 (Note: Eric Batten (left) and Ken Traill assist as Bradford Northern's Frank Whitcombe tackles Warrington's Jim Featherstone (№ 11) and Herbert Smith (right) looks on during Bradford Northern's 5-15 defeat by Warrington in the Championship Final during the 1947–48 season at Maine Road, Manchester, on Saturday 8 May 1948)

Personal information
- Full name: Frank William Whitcombe
- Born: 29 May 1913 Grangetown, Cardiff, Glamorgan, Wales
- Died: 17 January 1958 (aged 44) Keighley, England

Playing information
- Height: 5 ft 10 in (178 cm)
- Weight: 17 st 7 lb (111 kg)

Rugby union
- Position: Prop
Club
Years	Team	Pld	T	G	FG	P
1931–1931	Cardiff RFC	0	0	0	0	0
1932–1933	Aldershot Services	23	4	3	0	18
1934–1935	London Welsh RFC	10	0	0	0	0
1932–1935	Army Rugby Union	27	3	0	0	9
	Total	60	7	3	0	27

Rugby league
- Position: Prop
Club
Years	Team	Pld	T	G	FG	P
1935–38	Broughton Rangers	123	11	1	0	35
1938–49	Bradford Northern	331	35	1	0	107
	Total	454	46	2	0	142
Representative
Years	Team	Pld	T	G	FG	P
1938–48	Wales	14	0	0	0	0
1942	Yorkshire	1	0	0	0	0
1946	Great Britain	2	1	0	0	3
1946	GB tour games	17	2
1946	Rugby League XIII	1	0	0	0	0
- Relatives: Brian Whitcombe (son); Frank Whitcombe Jr (son); George Whitcombe (brother); Martin Whitcombe (grandson); James Whitcombe (great grandson)

Frank William Whitcombe (29 May 1913 – 17 January 1958), also known by the nickname of "The Big Man", was a Welsh rugby union, and professional rugby league footballer who played in the 1930s and 1940s. He played rugby union (RU) for Cardiff RFC, London Welsh RFC, Aldershot Services and Army Rugby Union, as a prop, and representative level rugby league (RL) for Great Britain, Rugby League XIII, and Wales, and at club level for Broughton Rangers and Bradford Northern, as a prop.

== Early life ==
Whitcombe was one of ten children growing up at 52 Wedmore Road in Grangetown. His father Frederick William Whitcombe worked as a blacksmith's striker at the Dry docks. His sport was as a prize fighter, bare-knuckle boxing, at Cardiff Docks known locally as Tiger Bay.

Times would be hard for Gertrude Whitcombe, Frank's mother, but she was a resourceful woman, for income the family firstly had her brother and Samuel & Emily Leonard as lodgers. Mrs Whitcombe would send one of the children to the brewery for a jug of yeast, and would brew her own beer, the children would sell this to the neighbours, and she would also make sloe gin to sell in the autumn

Along with brother George Whitcombe, Frank attended Ninian Park council school in Cardiff. On leaving school at 14 he worked for McNeil's The Coal and later as a van boy with the Great Western Railway.

== Rugby union career ==
=== Army Rugby Union ===
Then after a period of unemployment on 17 January 1931 Whitcombe enlisted as a Sapper (number 1869154) in 38th Field Company, Royal Engineers as a motor driver.

This was an outstanding sporting unit, in his first year of service, 38th Field Company won the Athletic Challenge Cup, the Boxing cup and the Rugby cup. This was the start of Whitcombe's rugby union playing career with the Army. He had a sparkling career playing 27 times for the Army team and won two caps. On 23 February 1935, Whitcombe played on the winning Army team against Territorial Army at Taunton R.F.C. by 18 – 5. A game used as a trial match for the upcoming inter services. He then won his first cap on the winning Army Rugby Union team against the Royal Navy 11–8, on 2 March, in a famous victory with the Army team having only 13 players, due to injury for most of the match. His fellow prop was the England captain Douglas Kendrew who was one of the players who had to leave the field injured after only 15 minutes.

Then on the losing side 3–6 to the Royal Air Force on 23 March at Twickenham in a game dominated by the RAF standoff Gus Walker, making the Inter-Services title of 1935 a Triple Tie. While serving in the Army, Whitcombe reached the rank of lance corporal, very few non-commissioned officers made the Army side at this time.

Prior to turning professional, Whitcombe played at Twickenham in the final of the Middlesex Sevens on Saturday 27 April 1935 for London Welsh losing 3–10 to Harlequins. The following week Whitcombe returned to Cardiff to play in the Welsh final trial

On 25 July 1933, in Cardiff, Whitcombe married Doris May (née Bryan) who lived at 15 Sussex Street also in Grangetown. Whitcombe's father-in-law, Alfie Bryan, was an amateur boxing trainer who worked in the gym with Jim Driscoll. Whitcombe had a brief boxing career while in the army. He won his first 11 bouts, but when he lost his twelfth he decided eleven good wins were not worth one good hiding.

=== King George V Silver Jubilee Trust ===
While playing rugby union for London Welsh RFC Whitcombe was selected to play for The Rest V Wales on 4 May 1935 in a special rugby union match arranged to benefit the King George V Silver Jubilee Trust at Cardiff Arms Park.

This match was used to identify potential talent for the upcoming season. It highlighted several emerging forwards in Wales, including Whitcombe.

Some of the players who took part in this game went on to be rugby league greats. On the Wales side that day playing at Stand off was a teenager from Swansea still attending Gowerton county school, one W T H "Willie" Davies, a future Lance Todd trophy winner and teammate of Whitcombe's at Bradford Northern and Great Britain. Playing on the wing for Wales was Arthur Bassett of Aberavon, who would also become Whitcombe's teammate for Great Britain. Bassett famously scored a hat-trick of tries in Great Britain's Ashes clinching victory over Australia at Brisbane in 1946. In The Rest side with Whitcombe on the wing was Alan Edwards of Aberavon, also a future Bradford Northern and Wales teammate. Edwards has the distinction of being one of only five players in the history of the game to win all six major rugby league cups in his career.

A quirk of fate here is Arthur Childs also played in the rest team with Whitcombe, a back row forward from Abertillery who also turned professional with the Halifax club. Twenty nine years later Arthur's son, Rodney Childs, and Whitcombe's son, Frank Whitcombe Jr, were the two prop forwards for the North Eastern Counties side against Sir Wilson Whineray's 5th New Zealand All Blacks team on their tour of Britain in 1964

Wales defeated the Rest 13–5. A special jersey was made for this game and given to the players afterwards. All the proceeds from this match where donated to the Kings Silver Jubilee Trust Fund.

== Rugby league career ==
Despite the efforts of his brother George to persuade him otherwise, an earlier offer, in March 1935 from the Wigan Rugby League Club was turned down by Whitcombe. When a second offer came on 18 September 1935 from the Broughton Rangers rugby league club, Whitcombe accepted. He was paid £100 for his services along with two new suits. Of his signing fee, £90 was to buy him out of the Army, leaving him £10 to start a new life at 5 Cawdor Road, Fallowfield, a suburb of Manchester, with his young family. Whitcombe shared his house with former Llanelli RFC and Wales rugby union player, Bryn Howells, who like Whitcombe had made the decision to 'Go north' and seek a better life for their families. He was now the Broughton Rangers fullback, Howells was also a professional Lancashire League cricketer.

Whitcombe's new club provided him with a job as a zookeeper at Belle Vue Zoological Gardens where Rangers played at the Belle Vue Stadium inside the motorcycle speedway track. At this time Belle Vue was the leisure centre for North West England.

Whitcombe made his début against Swinton at home on 19 October 1935 and played his last game for Broughton Rangers against St. Helens away on 17 December 1938. During his career at Rangers he played in a memorable victory on Christmas Day, 25 December 1937, when Broughton Rangers defeated Wally Prigg's touring Australian rugby league team 13–0 on their 1937/38 Kangaroo Tour of Great Britain. Soon after this Whitcombe was signed by Bradford Northern for a record fee and the family crossed the Pennines, and settled in Wibsey.

Extract from Bradford Northern 1948 Challenge Cup Final brochure:

Genial giant Frank is the wit as well as the heavy-weight of the team. He turns the scales at over 18st. And opposing forwards really know they have been in a game after 80 minutes with him. But as a boy in Cardiff, where he was born in 1913, Frank was a full back. He turned to the pack after joining the Army. He played 27 times for the Army team and won a Welsh international trial.

In 1935 Broughton Rangers signed him and he gained his first Welsh Rugby league International cap the following season. He has been Wales' first choice as prop ever since, he played in Australia with Gus Risman's team and played in the first two tests. Bradford Northern made one of their best moves ever when they signed him from Broughton Rangers. He takes a well earned benefit this season.

Following Whitcombe's world record transfer fee of £850 to Bradford Northern in 1938 – Rugby League secretary John Wilson added "He is the best in the game", (based on increases in average earnings, this would be approximately £141,700 in 2016).

=== Welsh international honours ===
After turning professional, Whitcombe went on to win his first cap for Wales while at Broughton Rangers, and further caps following his move to Bradford Northern. Between 1938 and 1948 Whitcombe won 14 caps.

His first cap for Wales was in their 17–9 victory over England on 10 November 1938 at Stebonheath Park, Llanelli's football ground. The Welsh team was captained by the record points scorer Jim Sullivan. Whitcombe's second cap against France away in Bordeaux in front of a crowd of 25,000 on 16 April 1939 resulting in a 16–10 defeat for Wales. Wales finished runners-up in the 1938–39 European Champions. His last game was against Australia on 20 November 1948 at St. Helens Swansea; Australia won 12–5.

=== Great Britain international career ===
Whitcombe was selected for the Great Britain tour to Australia in 1940 which was cancelled due to the outbreak of the Second World War. However he won two caps for Great Britain while at Bradford Northern in 1946 against Australia on the famous "Indomitables" tour.

On tour Whitcombe did not start the first game against Southern Districts, but then played nine successive matches including the Queensland game in Brisbane, and the two games against New South Wales in Sydney. He scored the second Great Britain try in the 8–8 drawn first test at the Sydney Cricket Ground on 17 June in front of a crowd of 64,527. This game was dubbed the 'Commando Test' due to the brutal exchanges in the first test. Shortly before Great Britain centre Jack Kitching was sent off, Whitcombe 'King Hit' his opposite Aussie prop Frank 'Bumper' Farrell. When an unfortunate St. John Ambulance man ran on to administer the Australian forward with smelling salts to bring him round a still groggy Farrell lashed out at him mistaking him for Whitcombe.

He then played in the winning side against Australia 14–5 in the second Test at the Brisbane Exhibition Ground on 6 July 1946 the crowd was 65,000. Great Britain won the 1946 Rugby League Ashes series. Following this game Whitcombe was referred to as "The Steam Roller" by the Melbourne newspaper 'The Truth'.

Despite the damage the Australian and Great Britain forwards had inflicted on each other only hours before after the third Test, Ken Gee, Joe Egan, Whitcombe, Ike Owens, Arthur Clues, 'Bumper' Farrell and Noel Mulligan drank heartily together at The Dolphin Hotel in Surry Hills until the early hours of next morning.

Fellow tourist Trevor Foster said of Whitcombe. "He was an outstanding player on the 1946 Indomitables tour, scoring tries and was the best forward in the scrum. He took on the Aussie pack on his own and was genuinely feared by the Australians. It took sometimes three and often four men to get him down in the tackle. He was strong and fearless".

Whitcombe's performances on tour attracted the attention of the Sydney based club, St. George. Club official Jack Moggridge offered Whitcombe a two-year contract at £600 per season as player-coach plus costs of transport and a lucrative job (based on increases in average earnings, this would be approximately £59,340 in 2016). Whitcombe signed the two-year contract with St George, however on his return to Bradford the family decided to stay in Yorkshire.

On 21 July the touring party left Australia for the New Zealand leg of the tour over a nine-day period Whitcombe played for Great Britain on 29 July 1946 against West Coast losing 8–17 then five days later on 3 August he played against Auckland winning 9–7 and again three days later on 6 August against South Auckland winning 42–12 and scoring a try. He played against Auckland again on 12 August winning 22–9 his last game for Great Britain. Whitcombe played 19 games on the 1946 tour of Australia and New Zealand more than any other player.

=== Rugby league Challenge Cup Final appearances ===
Whitcombe played in 5 Rugby League Challenge Cup Cup finals;

- Bradford Northern's 8-3 aggregate victory over Wigan in the 1943–44 Challenge Cup Final, the 0–3 defeat at Central Park, Wigan on Saturday 15 April 1944, and the 8–0 victory at Odsal Stadium, Bradford, on Saturday 22 April 1944. Whitcombe scoring the decisive try in the game
- Bradford Northern's 9-13 aggregate defeat by Huddersfield in the 1944–45 Challenge Cup Final, the 4–7 defeat at Fartown Ground, Huddersfield, on 28 April 1945, and the 5–6 defeat at Odsal Stadium on 5 May 1945 three days before the Second World War ended.

Whitcombe played prop, in three consecutive Wembley Challenge Cup Finals of 1946, 1947, and 1948. The first time any rugby league or Football club had appeared in three consecutive Wembley finals.

- Bradford Northern's 8–4 victory over Leeds in the 1946–47 Challenge Cup Final at Wembley Stadium, London on 3 May 1947, won the Lance Todd Trophy,
- Bradford Northern's 3–8 defeat by Wigan in the 1947–48 Challenge Cup Final at Wembley Stadium, London on 3 May 1947 and won the Lance Todd Trophy, on 1 May 1948, becoming the first player to be awarded The Lance Todd Trophy while on the losing team, as well as the first forward and the oldest player. This was the first rugby league final attended by a reigning monarch, King George VI.
- Bradford Northern's 12–0 victory over Halifax in the 1948–49 Challenge Cup Final at Wembley Stadium, London on 7 May the first Challenge Cup final to be "sold out" the crowd was 95,050 spectators.

Wembley Stadium 1947. Teammate Trevor Foster remembered "On our bus journey to the stadium we were caught up in a traffic jam and running late. The driver was in a state of panic, it could have been something to do with him not being sure of the route through London. Much to our amusement the great character, Frank Whitcombe, took over the driver's seat and proceeded to bypass all traffic in front and put his foot on the pedals. We sailed through the centre of the big city. Past the Palace of Westminster with motorists bellowing and waving fists at our bus. Frank, with a huge smile sailed away to get us to Wembley bang on time".

A personal record came in the 1948–49 Challenge Cup Final when, just 29 days short of his 35th birthday, he became the oldest as well as the heaviest player to play in a Challenge Cup final.

Bradford Northern played in five of the six Challenge Cup finals between 1944 and 1949, the first two finals; the 1943–44 Challenge Cup Final against Wigan, and the 1944–45 Challenge Cup Final against Huddersfield were played over two-legs, five Bradford Northern players played in all five of these finals, they were; Eric Batten, Vic Darlison, Donald Ward, Ernest Ward, and Frank Whitcombe.

On Saturday 30 April 1949 Bradford Northern played Whitehaven. Harry Hornby Managing Director of Bradford Northern had a bronze medal struck by Edouard Fraisse of Paris to commemorate Whitcombe's achievement of winning the Lance Todd trophy the previous year and for his services to Rugby League. This was presented to him after the match

=== Rugby Football League championship ===
Frank Whitcombe played in 5 Championship play-off finals;

- 1939–40 Championship play-off final played both legs, against Swinton away won 21–13 home won 16–9. Whitcombe scoring a try in each game
- 1940–41 Championship play-off final against Wigan played in both legs away won 17–6 home won 28–9 away.
- 1941–42 Championship play-off final against Dewsbury losing 0–13.
- 1944–45 Championship play-off final against Halifax Won losing 9–2 away before winning 24–11 at home.
- 1947–48 Championship Final was lost to Warrington 5–15 at Maine Road, Manchester.

=== County Cup Final appearances ===
Whitcombe played in 4 Yorkshire Cup Finals;

- 1940–41: Bradford Northern win the 1940–41 Yorkshire Cup Final won 15–5 against Dewsbury at Fartown Ground, Huddersfield, on Saturday 5 April 1941
- 1941–42: Bradford Northern win the 1941–42 Yorkshire County Cup Final won 24–0 against Halifax at Fartown Ground, Huddersfield, on Saturday 6 December 1941
- 1945–46: Bradford Northern win the 1945–46 Yorkshire County Cup final won 5–2 against Wakefield Trinity try being scored by Whitcombe, at Thrum Hall, Halifax on Saturday 3 November 1945
- 1948–49: Bradford Northern win the 1948–49 Yorkshire County Cup Final won 18–9 against Castleford at Headingley, Leeds on Saturday 30 October 1948

=== Yorkshire League ===
- Yorkshire League winners during the 1939–40 season
- Yorkshire County League winners during the 1940–41 season
- Yorkshire County League winners during the 1947–48 season

=== Testimonial match ===
Whitcombe's Testimonial match for Bradford Northern was on Saturday 10 April 1948 at Odsal Stadium, Bradford, against Wakefield Trinity

=== Honoured at Bradford Northern ===
Whitcombe made his début on Boxing Day 1938 in a 25–7 victory over Bramley at Odsal Stadium. He scored his first try for Bradford Northern against Wakefield Trinity in a 22–0 home win on 2 January 1939. Whitcombe's only goal for the club was in a Yorkshire League game against Hull F.C. on 2 June 1941 when Whitcombe kicked the only conversion in the Bradford northern score in their 29–5 win. His last game for Bradford Northern was the last match of the 1948–49 season against Dewsbury, fittingly at Odsal in a 10–9 win. Prior to this game Whitcombe shook hands with Ernest Ward on the field so the 19,000 Bradford Northern supporters could say farewell.

The Bradford Northern captain described Whitcombe as a great player.

During his career at Bradford Northern, Whitcombe played in 18 major finals and league wins, including five Rugby League Challenge Cup finals, five Rugby League Championship play-off finals, won four Yorkshire cups, and won three Yorkshire league titles.

In total he made 331 league and cup appearances. On Wednesday 10 November 1948 he played on the losing Bradford Northern side 7–21 to Col Maxwell's Australian 1948/49 Kangaroo Touring Team. At the end of the season he flew from Ringway Airport to France on Northern's first ever overseas tour on this end of season 'treat' for everybody connected with the club, after the disappointment of losing both Challenge Cup and Championship finals.

Bradford Northern played Toulouse Olympique winning 21–17 on 15 May 1948. The following day they beat AS Carcassonne 16–10 The second game was also the first time the Bradford club had played on a Sunday.

Whitcombe was included in Bradford Bulls Millennium Masters.

Harry Hornby, the chairman, and financial power behind Bradford Northern in those days paid a world record fee for Whitcombe. Whitcombe was a hard player during an era when the game was at its toughest. His rivalry with the great Australian and New South Wales second-row i.e. number 11 or 12, Arthur Clues who played for Leeds was legendary. Clues was the first Australian to join an English club after World War II. Their confrontations on the field during the Bradford Northern v Leeds local derby games are part of rugby league folklore.

Trevor Foster recalled an incident after Bradford Northern's 8–4 victory over Leeds in the 1946–47 Challenge Cup Final, ironically against Leeds in a fierce fought 11–9 Yorkshire cup tie win. Clues kicked out violently at Bradford Northern scrum-half Gwylfa Jones at a scrum missing his head by inches. Immediately Whitcombe stood up from the scrum and confronted his reckless action. He ran towards Arthur with both fists clenched Whitcombe drove the full force of his 18 stone frame in to Arthur Clues chest and pole-axed him. Clues could not get his breath and for ten minutes received emergency medical attention in front of the 17,000 Odsal crowd. Before the referee could send Whitcombe off, Whitcombe was already walking towards the changing rooms knowing what was coming. Arthur Clues was carried off on a stretcher and also sent off. In time honoured tradition the two men shook hands after the game to show their mutual respect for each other. Clues later confessed that no one had ever hit him so hard. Whitcombe received a 9-week ban for his actions

Whitcombe and Clues became great friends when their playing days were over. They used to spend a lot of time in Whitcombe's public house, The Kings Head, in Bradford. Whitcombe took on the role of self-appointed 'minder' for Bradford Northern's slightly built, mercurial Welsh stand-off Willie Davies when he was targeted by opposing teams.

== Honoured by the City of Cardiff - European Capital of Sport 2014 ==
The city of Cardiff celebrated the sporting achievements of 3 'local sporting heroes' as part of the city's celebrations as European Capital of Sport 2014. Frank Whitcombe along with his brother George were two of them, along with boxer Jack Petersen. A special event was held in their home town of Grangetown, in the local library, on 8 April 2014. Here their sporting achievements were recognized, which included the Challenge Cup being brought back to Ninian Park School and to 52 Wedmore road where Frank was born and grew up as a boy. Key note speakers included, Rugby journalist Peter Jackson, Wales Rugby League team manager Mike Nicholas, and Simon Foster, son of Frank's teammate Trevor Foster. Simon presented a talk on the 'Indominatables' tour to Australia. A poem composed by the Foster family as a tribute to Whitcombe was read out.

Frank Whitcombe – Super prop

"Who us this man called Whitcombe, This man all forwards fear, A prop who's always dangerous, Whenever he gets near (the try line)

The sturdily built Welshman, since moving up t'north, Has proved to be a man of power, A titan moving forth.

Every team opposing him, are put into the 'blue', None of them, who played back then could big Frank not subdue.

We know just how to deal with him; they all said that at first, But he's difficult to stop, when once he's on the burst.

Opposing forwards made their vows, that he'll not score again, But somehow it's beyond their powers, their efforts all in vain.

Most of his team just wait for him, he is afraid of none, It's nothing new to see him cross, with three (Nay 4) men hanging on.

If they decide to tackle him, by going for his knees, Just when they think they've got Frank taped, he'll hand them off with ease.

Who is this giant called Whitcombe, spectators well might ask, Those men, who tried to tackle him, endured no easy task!"

== Honoured by the city of Cardiff: Codebreakers statue ==
On Wednesday, 19 July 2023, thirteen Welsh rugby ‘codebreakers’ were commemorated by a statue in Cardiff Bay. All 13 grew up within a three-mile radius of Cardiff Bay. Billy Boston, Gus Risman and Clive Sullivan are depicted on the statue; Whitcombe, Jim Sullivan, Roy Francis, Colin Dixon, Dennis Brown, Gerald Cordle, Joe Corsi, Johnny Freeman, Dave Willicombe, and William 'Wax' Williams are all named on the monument. Many battled prejudice and racism before leaving Wales to play rugby league in the north of England. The statue, created by Yorkshire sculptor Steve Winterburn, stands in Landsea Square, a prominent part of Mermaid Quay in Cardiff Bay.

== Wartime service ==
During the Second World War, Whitcombe worked as a long-distance lorry driver for Harold Wood Ltd Bulk Liquid Transporters of Heckmondwike, a reserved occupation. Harold Wood had government contracts to deliver aviation fuel in the early part of the war to RAF airfields, and later oil to Royal Navy mother ship's off the coast of Rhyl for the re supply of submarines. He also delivered Toluene for explosives. This job involved driving all over the country, he often drove through the black out, and on several occasions when delivering aviation fuel took refuge under his wagon during air raids.

Many men in reserved occupations joined civil defence units. Under the command of Lieutenant "Two pips" Teddy Lightfoot, Whitcombe served as a sergeant major in the Wibsey branch of the Home Guard, meeting at the Park Hotel, Reevy Road, Wibsey

== Genealogical information ==
Frank Whitcombe was the brother of the association footballer for Cardiff City and Wales baseball captain; George Whitcombe, and the baseball player for Grange Albion; Teddy Whitcombe, and he was the cousin of the rugby union footballer; Frank Trott. He was the father of the rugby union footballer for Bradford RFC; Brian Whitcombe, and the rugby union prop for North Eastern Counties, Yorkshire, Bradford RFC; Frank Whitcombe Jr, the grandfather of the rugby union prop for England 'B' and Leicester Tigers; Martin Whitcombe, and the great-grandfather rugby union prop for England (Under-20s) and Leicester Tigers (2019/20 Development Squad); James William Whitcombe (born 20 November 2000).

== Outside of rugby league ==
When Whitcombe first arrived in Bradford from Fallowfield, he drove an Omnibus for The Blythe & Berwick Bus Company and later a wagon for Ryburn United Transport Ltd, off Wakefield Road, also in Bradford.

With his wife Doris they were the landlord, and landlady of two public houses in Bradford. Firstly in 1947 Whitcombe took on The Hallfield Hotel a Melbourne Breweries 'Ale House' on Trafalgar Road opposite Busby's Department Store on Manningham Lane. He then took The Kings Head, a Heys Brewery Public House on Westgate in the city centre. This was from 8 December 1948 until September 1952. Running a city centre pub in Bradford was challenging especially at weekends when the family had the opportunity to take The Airedale Heifer Inn also owned by Heys Brewery's at Sandbeds near Keighley it was too good to turn down. The family ran this pub until 1983.

Following his retirement from rugby league, Harry Hornby invited Whitcombe to sit on the board of directors at Bradford Northern, at various times he served as deputy Chairman & Chairman over his eight years in office between 1950 and 1958. On 10 September 1957 the Rugby League Council unanimously voted to accept Whitcombe as Bradford Northern's representative to The Rugby Football League replacing Harry Hornby after his resignation

== Tributes following Whitcombe's death ==
Whitcombe died of Pneumonia at home on Friday 17 January 1958 aged 44 years. Next day on 18 January Bradford Northern played Doncaster. As a mark of respect to the then Bradford Northern Vice Chairman the players, officials and spectators stood in silence before the game at Bentley Road, Bradford Northern players wore black arm bands.

Cyril Bunney, Bradford Northern Chairman said: " I don't know what to think. This is a terrible blow. He will be a tremendous loss to his family and hundreds of friends at Bradford Northern. No man is irreplaceable but Frank was as near to me as possible in all the help and guidance he has given me personally and to Bradford Northern. His loyalty knew no bounds – this season alone he has travelled thousands of miles at his own expense looking at players for Odsal".

C E 'Ted' Horsfall Rugby Football League Council Chairman said: "What bad luck for his family and Bradford Northern in the help he was giving in re building the club. He was always a great sportsman and could take it and give it with a smile, in addition to being a wonderful forward".

Bill Fallowfield Rugby Football League secretary, said: "What a pity. I liked Frank immensely. He was one the game can ill afford to lose. He has only been a member of the Rugby League Council a short time but his knowledge and genuine love of the game would have been most helpful".

Dai Rees (rugby) Bradford Northern coach, said: "Frank Whitcombe had a great part in putting Bradford Northern on the Rugby League map. The name of Frank Whitcombe and Odsal are synonymous. He was one of the game's greatest personalities. Genial Frank has gone but his name will live on at Odsal".

Arthur Clues Australian Rugby League international "Many's the tussle I've had with Frank. But off the field we were the greatest of pals. I reckon he was one of the best front row forwards for his size ever to play football"

Gideon Shaw, Chairman of the Rugby League selection committee, asked Whitcombe to apply for the team manager's post for the 1958 Ashes tour to Australia. Gideon added: "and who better? He's been out there, he can handle the players, he knows the game thoroughly. Eric England had the typed application ready today". Due to Whitcombe's untimely death, this was a position he never held.

He is buried at Morton Banks Cemetery, not far from the Heifer, with his wife Doris, who died on 18 August 2003.

in 2015 The Rugby Football League Head Office interior meeting rooms included six bespoke framed works celebrating incidental and quirky stories including Billy Boston's début, how Salford acquired the name 'Red Devils' and how Bradord Northern's Frank Whitcombe took over coach driving duties on the way to the 1946–47 Challenge Cup Final.
