= 1949–50 Yorkshire Cup =

- Structure: Regional knockout championship
- Teams: 16
- Winners: Bradford Northern
- Runners-up: Huddersfield

1949–50 was the forty-second occasion on which the Yorkshire Cup competition was held.

Bradford Northern won the trophy by beating Huddersfield by the score of 11–4.

The match was played at Headingley, Leeds, now in West Yorkshire. The attendance was 36,000, a record never to be beaten, and receipts were £6,365.

This was the second of two successive wins for Bradford Northern.

== Background ==
This season, junior/amateur clubs Yorkshire Amateurs were again invited to take part, and the number of clubs who entered remained at the same as last season's total number of sixteen.

This in turn resulted in no byes in the first round.

The competition again followed the original formula of a knock-out tournament, with the exception of the first round, which was still played on a two-legged home and away basis.

== Competition and results ==
=== Round 1 – first leg ===
Round 1's first leg involved eight matches (with no byes) and 16 clubs.

All first round ties were played on a two-legged home and away basis.

| Game no. | Fixture date | Home team | Score | Away team | Venue | agg | Att | Rec | Notes | Ref |
|---|---|---|---|---|---|---|---|---|---|---|
| 1 | Sat 10 Sep 1949 | Huddersfield | 13–5 | Leeds | Fartown | | | | | |
| 2 | Sat 10 Sep 1949 | Hunslet | 7–10 | Dewsbury | Parkside | | | | | |
| 3 | Sat 10 Sep 1949 | Batley | 10–7 | Halifax | Mount Pleasant | | | | | |
| 4 | Sat 10 Sep 1949 | Castleford | 12–8 | Hull | Wheldon Road | | | | | |
| 5 | Sat 10 Sep 1949 | York | 11–28 | Bradford Northern | Clarence Street | | | | | |
| 6 | Sat 10 Sep 1949 | Hull Kingston Rovers | 6–3 | Bramley | Craven Park (1) | | | | | |
| 7 | Sat 10 Sep 1949 | Wakefield Trinity | 19–12 | Featherstone Rovers | Belle Vue | | | | | |
| 8 | Sat 10 Sep 1949 | Keighley | 45–2 | Yorkshire Amateurs | Lawkholme Lane | | | | (Note: Yorkshire Amateurs were a team from Yorkshire which appeared to have players selected from many clubs, both professional and amateur clubs. Yorkshire Amateurs played on many grounds; this year their home match was played at Mount Pleasant, the ground of Batley.) | |

=== Round 1 – second leg ===
Round 1's second leg involved eight matches (with no byes) and 16 clubs.

All first round ties were played on a two-legged home and away basis.

| Game no. | Fixture date | Home team | Score | Away team | Venue | agg | Att | Rec | Notes | Ref |
|---|---|---|---|---|---|---|---|---|---|---|
| 1 | Mon 12 Sep 1949 | Leeds | 8–16 | Huddersfield | Headingley | 13–29 | | | | |
| 2 | Tue 13 Sep 1949 | Dewsbury | 19–0 | Hunslet | Crown Flatt | 29–7 | | | | |
| 3 | Tue 13 Sep 1949 | Halifax | 2–7 | Batley | Thrum Hall | 9–17 | | | | |
| 4 | Tue 13 Sep 1949 | Hull | 13–13 | Castleford | Boulevard | 21–25 | | | (Note: The date is given by RUGBYLEAGUEproject as Tuesday 13 September, but by the official Hull F.C. archives as Wednesday 14 September.) | |
| 5 | Wed 14 Sep 1949 | Bradford Northern | 25–11 | York | Odsal | 53–22 | | | | |
| 6 | Wed 14 Sep 1949 | Bramley | 13–4 | Hull Kingston Rovers | Barley Mow | 16–10 | | | | |
| 7 | Wed 14 Sep 1949 | Featherstone Rovers | 2–12 | Wakefield Trinity | Post Office Road | 14–31 | | | | |
| 8 | Thu 15 Sep 1949 | Yorkshire Amateurs | 8–15 | Keighley | Mount Pleasant | 10–60 | | | | |

=== Round 2 – quarterfinals ===
Round 2's quarterfinals involved four matches and eight clubs.

All second round ties were played on a knock-out basis.

| Game no. | Fixture date | Home team | Score | Away team | Venue | agg | Att | Rec | Notes | Ref |
|---|---|---|---|---|---|---|---|---|---|---|
| 1 | Wed 21 Sep 1949 | Bradford Northern | 13–6 | Castleford | Odsal | | | | | |
| 2 | Wed 21 Sep 1949 | Bramley | 5–4 | Keighley | Barley Mow | | | | | |
| 3 | Wed 28 Sep 1949 | Huddersfield | 20–12 | Wakefield Trinity | Fartown | | 21737 | | | |
| 4 | Thu 29 Sep 1949 | Dewsbury | 12–5 | Batley | Crown Flatt | | | | | |

=== Round 3 – semifinals ===
Round 3's semifinals involved two matches and four clubs.

Both semi-final ties were played on a knock-out basis.

| Game no. | Fixture date | Home team | Score | Away team | Venue | agg | Att | Rec | Notes | Ref |
|---|---|---|---|---|---|---|---|---|---|---|
| 1 | Wed 12 Oct 1949 | Bramley | 6–8 | Bradford Northern | Barley Mow | | | | | |
| 2 | Wed 19 Oct 1949 | Dewsbury | 2–7 | Huddersfield | Crown Flatt | | | | | |

=== Final ===
| Game no. | Fixture date | Home team | Score | Away team | Venue | agg | Att | Rec | Notes | Ref |
|---|---|---|---|---|---|---|---|---|---|---|
| | Saturday 29 October 1949 | Bradford Northern | 11–4 | Huddersfield | Headingley | | 36,000 | £6,365 | (Note: The attendance was a new record, never to be beaten, and beating the previous of 34,300, set in 1946.) (Note: Headingley, Leeds is the home ground of Leeds RLFC, with a capacity of 21,000. The record attendance was 40,175 for a league match between Leeds and Bradford Northern on 21 May 1947.) | |

==== Teams and scorers ====
| Bradford Northern | No. | Huddersfield |
|---|---|---|
| | Teams | |
| Billy Leake | 1 | E. Swallow |
| Eric Batten | 2 | George Wilson |
| Jack Kitching | 3 | Jeff Bawden |
| Ernest Ward | 4 | Pat Devery |
| Emlyn Walters | 5 | Lionel Cooper |
| Willie Davies | 6 | Russell Pepperell |
| Donald Ward | 7 | Billy Banks |
| Eric Day | 8 | John Maiden |
| Victor "Vic" Darlison | 9 | Mel Meek |
| Ron Greaves | 10 | John "Jack" Daly |
| Trevor Foster | 11 | Ike Owens |
| Barry Tyler | 12 | Bob Nicholson |
| Ken Traill | 13 | Dave Valentine (c) |
| Dai Rees | Coach | ?? |
| 11 | Score | 4 |
| 4 | HT | 2 |
| | Scorers | |
| | Tries | |
| Willie Davies (1) | T | |
| | Goals | |
| Ernest Ward (4) | G | Jeff Bawden (2) |
| Referee | | Mr. W. Hemmings (Halifax) |

Scoring - Try = three (3) points - Goal = two (2) points - Drop goal = two (2) points

=== The road to success ===
All the ties in the first round were played on a two leg (home and away) basis.

For the first round ties, the first club named in each of the ties played the first leg at home.

For the first round ties, the scores shown are the aggregate score over the two legs.

First round
Hull Kingston Rovers | 10
Bramley | 16
Keighley | 60
Yorkshire Amateurs | 10
York | 22
Bradford Northern | 53
Castleford | 25
Hull | 21
Hunslet | 7
Dewsbury | 29
Batley | 17
Halifax | 9
Huddersfield | 29
Leeds | 13
Wakefield Trinity | 31
Featherstone Rovers | 14

Second round
Bramley | 5
Keighley | 4
Bradford Northern | 13
Castleford | 6
Dewsbury | 12
Batley | 5
Huddersfield | 20
Wakefield Trinity | 12

Semifinals
Bramley | 6
Bradford Northern | 8
Dewsbury | 2
Huddersfield | 7

Final
Bradford Northern | 11
Huddersfield | 4

== See also ==
- 1949–50 Northern Rugby Football League season
- Rugby league county cups
