= 1946–47 Challenge Cup =

Rugby league competition

- Duration: 5 rounds
- Winners: Bradford Northern
- Runners-up: Leeds

The 1946–47 Challenge Cup was the 46th staging of rugby league's oldest knockout competition, the Challenge Cup.

== First round ==
Date	Team one	Score one	Team two	Score two
15 Feb	Warrington	46	Brookland	3
22 Feb	Castleford	19	Swinton	2
22 Feb	Leigh	3	Wakefield Trinity	3
22 Feb	Liverpool	27	Pemberton Rovers	6
22 Feb	Oldham	3	Belle Vue Rangers	10
22 Feb	Salford	5	Bradford Northern	2
22 Feb	Widnes	13	Rochdale Hornets	2
22 Feb	Wigan	24	Featherstone Rovers	11
22 Feb	Workington Town	48	Widnes Dragons	0
01 Mar	Brookland	3	Warrington	32
01 Mar	Hunslet	2	Hull Kingston Rovers	3
01 Mar	Pemberton Rovers	5	Liverpool	20
01 Mar	Swinton	8	Castleford	7
01 Mar	Wheldale	0	Halifax	25
01 Mar	Widnes Dragons	5	Workington Town	21
08 Mar	Belle Vue Rangers	0	Oldham	0
08 Mar	Dewsbury	0	Huddersfield	3
08 Mar	Hull FC	11	Bramley	3
08 Mar	Hull Kingston Rovers	0	Hunslet	6
08 Mar	Leeds	12	Barrow	0
08 Mar	St Helens	17	Keighley	7
10 Mar	Huddersfield	3	Dewsbury	0
11 Mar	Keighley	8	St Helens	5
12 Mar	Bradford Northern	10	Salford	0
12 Mar	Bramley	2	Hull FC	28
12 Mar	Halifax	20	Wheldale	10
12 Mar	Rochdale Hornets	0	Widnes	11
12 Mar	Wakefield Trinity	5	Leigh	0
12 Mar	York	3	Batley	6
13 Mar	Batley	11	York	0
13 Mar	Featherstone Rovers	7	Wigan	13
13 Mar	Barrow	0	Leeds	6

== Second round ==
Date	Team one	Score one	Team two	Score two
22 Mar	Batley	2	Castleford	13
22 Mar	Halifax	3	Workington Town	10
22 Mar	Huddersfield	0	Bradford Northern	8
22 Mar	Leeds	5	Hunslet	0
22 Mar	Liverpool	10	Hull FC	5
22 Mar	Wakefield Trinity	8	Widnes	5
22 Mar	Warrington	24	St Helens	2
22 Mar	Wigan	12	Belle Vue Rangers	5

== Quarterfinals ==
Date	Team one	Score one	Team two	Score two
29 Mar	Bradford Northern	10	Workington Town	3
29 Mar	Wakefield Trinity	15	Liverpool	0
29 Mar	Warrington	5	Castleford	0
29 Mar	Wigan	0	Leeds	5

== Semifinals ==
Date	Team one	Score one	Team two	Score two
19 Apr	Leeds	21	Wakefield Trinity	0
19 Apr	Warrington	7	Bradford Northern	11

== Final ==
3 May 1947

Bradford Northern	8 – 4	Leeds
Try Walters, Foster; DG E Ward		Goals Cook (2)

Wembley, London
Attendance: 77,605
Referee: P Cowell (Warrington)
Player of the Match: Willie Davies

1	George Carmichael
2	Eric Batten
3	Jack Kitching
4	Ernest Ward
5	Emlyn Walters
6	Willie Davies
7	Donald Ward
8	Frank Whitcombe
9	Vic Darlison
10	Herbert Smith
11	Barry Tyler
12	Trevor Foster
13	Hagan Evans
Coach:
Dai Rees

1	Bert Cook
2	E. C. Whitehead
3	Gareth Price
4	T. L. Williams
5	A. T. Cornelius
6	Dickie Williams
7	Dai Jenkins
8	C Brereton
9	Con Murphy
10	Dai Prosser
11	Arthur Clues
12	Alf Watson
13	Ike Owens
Coach:

Leeds reached the Wembley final for the second time, doing so without conceding a single point in the final five rounds of the tournament. However Bradford Northern beat Leeds 8-4 in the final in front of a crowd of 77,605. Trevor Foster and Emlyn Walters scored Bradford's tries and were converted by Ernest Ward. Willie Davies, Bradford Northern's stand-off half back, won the Lance Todd Trophy for man of the match.

This was Bradford's third Cup final win in five Final appearances including one win and one loss during World War II.
