= 1948–49 Challenge Cup =

Rugby league competition

- Duration: 5 rounds
- Number of teams: 32
- Winners: Bradford Northern
- Runners-up: Halifax

The 1948–49 Challenge Cup was the 48th staging of rugby league's oldest knockout competition, the Challenge Cup.

The 29 clubs of the rugby league were joined in the competition by three junior clubs, one each from Yorkshire, Lancashire and Cumberland; respectively these junior clubs were Normanton, Vine Tavern and Broughton Moor.

== First round ==
The first round ties were two-legged and were to be played on consecutive weekends in February 1949. The draw was made on 17 January 1949. The tie between Vine Tavern and York was drawn to have the leg at York played first but the clubs agreed to reverse the tie to enable Vine Tavern to play their home leg Knowsley Road, home of nearby St. Helens. Featherstone's tie with Swinton should have had the first leg played at Featherstone. However Featherstone invoked their right under the competition rules as the first drawn club to decide where the first leg would be played and insisted that it was played at Swinton to avoid clashes with the home ties of neighbouring clubs, Normanton and Castleford, this was despite Swinton's opposition to the switch.

The first leg ties were played on Saturday 12 February.

Home	Score	Away	Referee
Bradford Northern	3–4	St. Helens	G. S. Phillips
Castleford	10–2	Bramley	C. F. Appleton
Dewsbury	9–6	Barrow	N. T. Railton
Swinton	15–2	Featherstone Rovers	H. Holland
Huddersfield	4–5	Rochdale Hornets	T. E. Rees
Hull F.C.	4–0	Halifax	P. Cowell
Hunslet	22–0	Salford	F. Smith
Leeds	16–2	Batley	W. Stockley
Liverpool Stanley	3–32	Wakefield Trinity	T. W. Hemmings
Normanton	4–9	Belle Vue Rangers	R. S. Abram
Oldham	30–0	Broughton Moor	F. Cotton
Warrington	17–7	Hull Kingston Rovers	L. Thorpe
Whitehaven	0–0	Keighley	H. Squires
Wigan	11–12	Leigh	A. S. Dobson
Workington Town	6–7	Widnes	A. Hill
Vine Tavern	4–11	York	D. Halliday

The second leg ties were played on Saturday 19 February.

Home	Score	Away	Referee	Aggregate score
St. Helens	0–5	Bradford Northern	A. S. Dobson	4–8
Bramley	2–10	Castleford	P. Cowell	4–20
Barrow	13–9	Dewsbury	W. Hemmings	19–18
Featherstone Rovers	13–10	Swinton	R. L. Thorpe	15–25
Rochdale Hornets	0–11	Huddersfield	F. Cottam	5–15
Halifax	10–0	Hull F.C.	G. S. Phillips	10–4
Salford	11–10	Hunslet	A. Howgate	11–32
Batley	4–7	Leeds	C. F. Appleton	6–23
Wakefield Trinity	41–12	Liverpool Stanley	S. W. Stockley	73–15
Belle Vue Rangers	12–0	Normanton	T. Armitage	21–4
Broughton Moor	2–35	Oldham	L. J. Dalby	2–65
Hull Kingston Rovers	5–28	Warrington	N. T. Railton	12–45
Keighley	19–9	Whitehaven	F. Smith	19–9
Leigh	4–5	Wigan	A. Hill	16–16
Widnes	0–10	Workington Town	S. Adams	7–16
York	17–3	Vine Tavern	B. Lister	28–7

The tie between Leigh and Wigan ended in controversy. In January the cup committee recommended that ties ending with the scores level should play 20 minutes of extra time (10 minutes each way) with a replay only being required if the scores remained tied after this period. This recommendation as accepted by the Rugby League Council but was not, officially, made known to referees. Therefore, at the end of the second leg the referee in the Leigh v Wigan tie, Alfred Hill, ended the game after 80 minutes and did not play any extra time. The second leg was declared null and void by the Rugby League Council and a replay ordered for the following Saturday at a neutral venue, Swinton's Station Road with only the score from the first leg being taken forward into the replay.

The replay, refereed by W. Hemmings, was won 10–4 by Wigan who therefore went forward to the second round 21–16 on aggregate.

== Second round ==
The second round draw was made on 21 February 1949 with ties to be played on Saturday 5 March. On the day the game between Wigan and Wakefield was postponed due to snowfall and was played the following Wednesday, 9 March, instead.

Home	Score	Away	Referee
Barrow	13–2	Keighley
Belle Vue Rangers	8–3	Warrington	A. S. Dobson
Bradford Northern	11–5	Castleford	F. Smith
Halifax	5–0	Swinton	W. Stockley
Huddersfield	3–0	Workington Town	C. F. Appleton
Leeds	14–8	Hunslet	P. Cowll
York	3–4	Oldham	G. S. Phillips
Wigan	37–2	Wakefield Trinity	S. Adams

== Third round ==
The draw for the third round was made on 7 March with ties to be played on Saturday 19 March.

Home	Score	Away	Referee
Barrow	8–7	Wigan	M. Coates
Bradford Northern	8–7	Belle Vue Rangers	G. S. Phillips
Leeds	9–20	Huddersfield	C. F. Appleton
Oldham	2–7	Halifax	A. S. Dobson

== Semi-finals ==
The semi-final draw was made on 21 March with neutral venues being announced immediately after the completion of the draw, the ties were played on 2 April.

Home	Score	Away	Venue	Referee
Bradford Northern	10–0	Barrow	Station Road, Swinton	A. S. Dobson
Halifax	11–10	Huddersfield	Odsal Stadium, Bradford	G. S. Phillips

== Final ==
The Challenge Cup tournament's final was to be played by Bradford and Halifax at Wembley Stadium. Bradford won the game 12–0 in the final played in front of a world record rugby league crowd of 95,000. Trevor Foster and Eric Batten scored the tries for Bradford and Ernest Ward kicked three goals as well as winning the Lance Todd Trophy for man-of-the-match.

This was Bradford's fourth Cup Final win in seven final appearances including one win and one loss during World War II.

7 May 1949
3:00 pm

Bradford Northern	12 – 0	Halifax
Tries Batten, Foster; Goals E. Ward (3)	Report

Wembley, London
Attendance: 95,000
Referee: G. S. Phillips (Widnes)
Player of the Match: Ernest Ward

Bradford Northern	Position	Halifax
Billy Leake	FB	Denis Chalkley
Eric Batten	WG	Arthur Daniels
Jack Kitching	CE	Gareth Price (c)
Ernest Ward (c)	CE	Paddy Reid
Alan Edwards	WG	Enoka Macdonald
Willie Davies	SO	George Kenny
Donald Ward	SH	Stan Kielty
Frank Whitcombe	PR	Jack Rothwell
Vic Darlison	HK	Alvin Ackerley
Ron Greaves	PR	Mike Condon
Barry Tyler	SR	Jack Pansegrouw
Trevor Foster	SR	Desmond Healy
Ken Traill	LF	Frank Mawson
Dai Rees	Coach	Arthur Atkinson
