= 1950–51 Yorkshire Cup =

- Structure: Regional knockout championship
- Teams: 16
- Winners: Huddersfield
- Runners-up: Castleford

1950–51 was the forty-third occasion on which the Yorkshire Cup competition had been held.

Huddersfield won the trophy by beating Castleford by the score of 16–3

The match was played at Headingley, Leeds, now in West Yorkshire. The attendance was 28,610 and receipts were £5,152

== Background ==
This season, junior/amateur clubs Yorkshire Amateurs were again invited to take part and the number of clubs who entered remained at the same as last season's total number of sixteen.

This in turn resulted in no byes in the first round.

The competition again followed the original formula of a knock-out tournament, with the exception of the first round which was still played on a two-legged home and away basis.

== Competition and results ==
=== Round 1 – first leg ===
Involved 8 matches (with no byes) and 16 clubs

All first round ties are played on a two-legged home and away basis

Game No	Fixture date	Home team	Score	Away team	Venue	agg	Att	Rec	Notes	Ref
1	Sat 2 Sep 1950	Featherstone Rovers	7–20	Leeds	Post Office Road					
2	Sat 2 Sep 1950	Hull Kingston Rovers	9–0	Batley	Craven Park (1)					
3	Sat 2 Sep 1950	Keighley	9–14	Castleford	Lawkholme Lane					
4	Sat 2 Sep 1950	Yorkshire Amateurs	2–35	Hunslet	Headingley				(Note: Yorkshire Amateurs were a team from Yorkshire which appeared to have players selected from many both professional and amateur clubs - Yorkshire Amateurs played on many grounds, this year the home leg was played at Headingley, the ground of Leeds)	
5	Sat 2 Sep 1950	Wakefield Trinity	43–4	York	Belle Vue					
6	Sat 2 Sep 1950	Dewsbury	14–2	Hull	Crown Flatt					
7	Sat 2 Sep 1950	Halifax	5–5	Bradford Northern	Thrum Hall					
8	Sat 2 Sep 1950	Bramley	22–21	Huddersfield	Barley Mow					

=== Round 1 – second leg ===
Involved 8 matches (with no byes) and 16 clubs

All first round ties are played on a two-legged home and away basis

Game No	Fixture date	Home team	Score	Away team	Venue	agg	Att	Rec	Notes	Ref
1	Mon 4 Sep 1950	Leeds	20–9	Featherstone Rovers	Headingley	40–16				
2	Tue 5 Sep 1950	Batley	21–4	Hull Kingston Rovers	Mount Pleasant	21–13				
3	Wed 6 Sep 1950	Castleford	2–4	Keighley	Wheldon Road	16–13				
4	Wed 6 Sep 1950	Hunslet	26–2	Yorkshire Amateurs	Parkside	61–4				
5	Wed 6 Sep 1950	York	2–23	Wakefield Trinity	Clarence Street	6–66				
6	Tue 12 Sep 1950	Hull	2–2	Dewsbury	Boulevard	4–16				
7	Wed 13 Sep 1950	Bradford Northern	12–4	Halifax	Odsal	15–9				
8	Wed 13 Sep 1950	Huddersfield	39–5	Bramley	Fartown	60–27				

=== Round 2 - quarterfinals ===
Involved 4 matches and 8 clubs

All second round ties are played on a knock-out basis

Game No	Fixture date	Home team	Score	Away team	Venue	agg	Att	Rec	Notes	Ref
1	Mon 18 Sep 1950	Leeds	2–29	Huddersfield	Headingley					
2	Tue 19 Sep 1950	Batley	10–8	Wakefield Trinity	Mount Pleasant					
3	Wed 20 Sep 1950	Bradford Northern	0–4	Castleford	Odsal					
4	Wed 20 Sep 1950	Hunslet	3–2	Dewsbury	Parkside					

=== Round 3 – semifinals ===
Involved 2 matches and 4 clubs

Both semi-final ties are played on a knock-out basis

Game No	Fixture date	Home team	Score	Away team	Venue	agg	Att	Rec	Notes	Ref
1	Fri 6 Oct 1950	Hunslet	7–20	Huddersfield	Parkside					
2	Tue 10 Oct 1950	Batley	2–2	Castleford	Mount Pleasant					

=== Round 3 – semifinals - Replay ===
Involved 2 matches and 4 clubs

Both semi-final ties are played on a knock-out basis

Game No	Fixture date	Home team	Score	Away team	Venue	agg	Att	Rec	Notes	Ref
R	Fri 13 Oct 1950	Castleford	13–9	Batley	Wheldon Road					

=== Final ===
Game No	Fixture date	Home team	Score	Away team	Venue	agg	Att	Rec	Notes	Ref
	Saturday 4 November 1950	Huddersfield	16–3	Castleford	Headingley		28,610	£5,152	(Note: The attendance is given as 28,610 by RUGBYLEAGUEproject but 28,906 by the Rothmans Rugby League Yearbook of 1991-92) (Note: Headingley, Leeds, is the home ground of Leeds RLFC with a capacity of 21,000. The record attendance was 40,175 for a league match between Leeds and Bradford Northern on 21 May 1947.)	

==== Teams and scorers ====
Huddersfield	№	Castleford
	teams	
Johnny Hunter	1	Ron Lewis
Dick Cracknell	2	Reg Lloyd
Jim Bowden	3	George Broughton Jr.
I W Clark	4	Percy Aldred
Lionel Cooper	5	Len Brown
Russ Pepperell	6	Arthur Fisher
Billy Banks	7	George Langfield
Frank Wagstaff	8	Joe Anderson
Jim Mundy	9	Jimmy Jones
Arthur Wilmot	10	Leo Fleming
Bob Nicholson	11	George Howard
Ike Owens	12	Leslie Haughey
Dave Valentine	13	Frank Mugglestone
??	Coach	??
16	score	3
7	HT	3
	Scorers	
	Tries	
Russ Pepperell (2)	T	Reg Lloyd (1)
	Goals	
James Bowden (5)	G	
Referee		Ron Gelder (Wakefield)
Man of the Match		Billy Banks

Scoring - Try = three (3) points - Goal = two (2) points - Drop goal = two (2) points

=== The road to success ===
All the ties in the first round were played on a two leg (home and away) basis.

For the first round ties, the first club named in each of the ties played the first leg at home.

For the first round ties, the scores shown are the aggregate score over the two legs.

First round
Yorkshire Amateurs	4
Hunslet	61
Dewsbury	16
Hull	4
Featherstone Rovers	16
Leeds	40
Bramley	27
Huddersfield	61
Hull Kingston Rovers	13
Batley	21
Wakefield Trinity	66
York	6
Halifax	9
Bradford Northern	15
Keighley	13
Castleford	16

Second round
Hunslet	3
Dewsbury	2
Leeds	2
Huddersfield	29
Batley	10
Wakefield Trinity	8
Bradford Northern	0
Castleford	4

Semifinals
Hunslet	7
Huddersfield	20
Batley	2 (9)
Castleford	2 (13)

Final
Huddersfield	16
Castleford	3

== See also ==
- 1950–51 Northern Rugby Football League season
- Rugby league county cups
