= Ken Davies (rugby) =

Welsh rugby league footballer

Personal information
- Full name: Kenneth Davies
- Born: 29 May 1916 Blaengarw, Wales
- Died: 1984 (aged 67–68)

Playing information

Rugby union
Club
Years	Team	Pld	T	G	FG	P
	Blaengarw RFC	0	0	0	0	0
	Bridgend RFC	0	0	0	0	0
	Total	0	0	0	0	0

Rugby league
- Position: Scrum-half
Club
Years	Team	Pld	T	G	FG	P
1936–51	Keighley	199	34	7	0	116
1941–42	→Bradford Northern (loan)	4	0	0	0	0
	Total	203	34	7	0	116
Representative
Years	Team	Pld	T	G	FG	P
1944	Army XIII	1	0	0	0	0

Kenneth Henry Davies (29 May 1916 – 1984) was a Welsh rugby union footballer and professional rugby league footballer. He played at club level for Blaengarw RFC, Bridgend RFC and Keighley RLFC in the 1930s, 1940s and 1950s as a stand-off. He formed a formidable partnership with Thomas Cockcroft at scrum-half.

== Background ==
Davies was born in Blaengarw, Wales.

Ken was brought up at 16 Brigg Street, Blaengarw, he played for his local school team and later Blaengarw first XV. when he moved to Bridgend he was initially under study to Glamorgan County player Cliff Jones, from Bridgend he signed for Keighley aged 19 in April 1936. The attraction of a job as a fitter at Prince Smith & Stell persuaded him to give up his job in the pit and move north.

== Keighley RLFC ==
Davies signed from Welsh side, Bridgend Rugby Football Club in 1936 and went on to play 199 games for Keighley. He made his début 14 April 1936 v Huddersfield Away on the losing team 0–12. The Second World War took away many of his best playing years. In one of the war time fixtures on 7 November 1942, Davies played stand-off for Keighley against Leeds his scrum-half partner was a war time loan player from Warrington fellow Welshman Mel De Lloyd. Also on loan that day was the great Jim Sullivan from Wigan who played an inspirational game at full-back for the Lawkholme Lane club.

On 10 April 1943 Davies played in a Challenge Cup semi-final 1st leg at Lawkholme Lane in which Keighley beat Leeds 5–3. Leeds won the second leg 27–0 to qualify to meet Dewsbury in the final.

== Yorkshire Cup ==
Davies played at centre in Keighley RLFC's 7–10 aggregate defeat by Bradford Northern in the 1943 Yorkshire Cup Final during the 1943–44 Wartime Emergency League season, the 2–5 defeat at Odsal Stadium, Bradford on Saturday 27 November 1943, and the 5–5 draw at Lawkholme Lane, Keighley on Saturday 4 December 1943.

== Championship final appearances ==
While on leave from the Army in 1941–42 season, Davies was signed as a guest player for Bradford Northern, when regular Scrum-half Donald Ward was injured. Davies played in Bradford Northern's 0–13 defeat by Dewsbury in the Championship Final during the 1941-42 season at Headingley, Leeds on Saturday 18 April 1942 in front of a crowd of 18,000 and receipts £1,121.0.0. In total Davies played four games for Bradford Northern.

== Representative Rugby ==
On 18 December 1944, Davies played on the wing, marking international wing Eric Batten, for the Army XIII against a Rugby League XIII at Thrum Hall, Halifax the home of Halifax. The attendance was 2,500 with gate receipts of £160, the Rugby League XIII won the game by 14–11.

== Military service ==
During World War II Davies served in the Royal Electrical and Mechanical Engineers (REME) where he served in the North African campaign. While stationed in Cairo he played for the REME Rugby team which also included Bradford Northern, and Wales second row Trevor Foster.

Despite the intervention of the war he went on to be a great servant to the club and was awarded a benefit season in 1950. First, Keighley played against a Welsh XIII. Then at The Willow Tree Inn in Riddlesden on 28 June 1950, Davies had his benefit dinner. Ken Davies playing career ended with an 8–8 drawn game against Bramley in the last match of the 1950–51 season.

== Life after rugby ==
Ken Davies settled in Keighley when he retired from rugby as a shop keeper for many years. Davies formed a lifelong friendship with his former teammate Thomas Cockcroft. Davies became godfather to Cockcroft's daughter Mollie, (Whitcombe), and his son William Cockcroft took Kenneth as his middle name.

On 21 October 1981, Davies returned to Wales to take part in the golden jubilee celebrations of Blaengarw RFC.

His visit coincided with the touring Australia national rugby union team, the Wallabies playing against Bridgend, the club Jones had signed from for Keighley. At this game were many former professional rugby league footballers who were welcomed back to the club to enjoy the occasion. It was different in 1935 when Davis 'Went North'. His loss was considered so severe that a veto on rugby league agents was enforced by the Bridgend club.

Davies died in September 1984.
