= Frank Mugglestone =

English rugby league footballer (1924–2019)

- Frank Mugglestone prior to Castleford's 13-9 victory Batley in the 1950–51 Yorkshire Cup semi-final replay at Wheldon Road, Castleford on Friday 13 October 1950

Personal information
- Full name: Frank Mugglestone
- Born: 22 July 1924; Swinton, Rotherham, England
- Died: 4 January 2019 (aged 94); Saint John, New Brunswick, Canada

Playing information
- Position: Second-row, Loose forward
Club
Years	Team	Pld	T	G	FG	P
1941–46	Bradford Northern	83	5	18	0	51
1946–52	Castleford	146	19	0	4	65
	Total	229	24	18	4	116

Frank Mugglestone B.Sc., M.Ed., D.L.C., C.A.G.S. (22 July 1924 – 4 January 2019) was an English professional rugby league footballer who played from 1940 to 1950. He played at club level for Bradford Northern and Castleford, as a (occasional) goal-kicking second-row or loose forward.

== Background ==
Frank Mugglestone was born in Swinton, Rotherham, West Riding of Yorkshire, England. He was a pupil at Hemsworth Grammar School, Hemsworth, Wakefield. He moved to Bradford aged 17 in c. 1941. His family were landlords of The Unicorn public house, Ivegate, Bradford. He joined the Royal Air Force in 1942 during World War II. He served in the United Kingdom, Egypt and Palestine until 1947. He was a student at Loughborough University, Leicestershire. Following his graduation in 1951, he taught chemistry, mathematics, physics, physical education at (Wolstan) Dixie Grammar School, Market Bosworth, Leicestershire for 7 years from 1951 to 1958. In 1955 he and Leicester Tigers' players; Bob Beason (fl. 1960–1972) and Reginald Dickinson founded Dixie Old Boys RFC (subsequently known as Old Bosworthians RFC, and since the 1997 merger with West Leicester RFC (founded 1963) known as Leicester Forest RFC);.

He played rugby union for Dixie Old Boys under the pseudonym of Frank Stone, to protect his identity, because he had already played rugby league and had received a lifetime ban from rugby union, as this was in the era prior to 1995 when rugby union was strictly amateur, and any association with rugby league was considered an act of professionalism.

He and his wife and children emigrated to Saint John, New Brunswick, Canada in 1958. He completed his graduate studies at Springfield College, Massachusetts, USA; he received his Certificate of Advanced Study from the University of Massachusetts, USA. He taught mathematics, physics, physical education at Saint John High School, Saint John, New Brunswick for 7-years from 1958 to 1965, during which time took the school rugby league team on a tour of England, due to the high transportation costs, the team had arrived in England without; football boots, rugby shirts, rugby shorts, rugby socks, or rugby balls, the former rugby league footballer; Arthur Clues, and an old adversary of Frank Mugglestone, who owned a sportswear shop in Merrion Street, Leeds, provided the team with the equipment for free (gratis), the team played matches including against school age teams from; Castleford (two matches), Stanningley, and Leeds; he was the Principal of Hazen White-St. Francis School (New Brunswick School District 08), Saint John, New Brunswick from 1965 to 1967; he was the Principal of Saint John Vocational School, Saint John, New Brunswick from 1967 to 1977; he was the Principal of the then newly built Westisle Consolidated High School, Rosebank, Prince County, Prince Edward Island from 1979 to 1985; he was a follower of Belleisle Rovers Rugby Club, Belleisle, New Brunswick; he died aged 94 at Saint John Regional Hospital, Saint John, New Brunswick, on Friday 4 January 2019, and his funeral service took place at Saint Mary and Saint Bartholomew's Church, 646 Westmorland Road, Saint John, New Brunswick, E2J 2H4 at 2:00pm on Tuesday 22 January 2019.

== Playing career ==
=== County Cup Final appearances ===
Frank Mugglestone played loose forward in Castleford's 9–18 defeat by Bradford Northern in the 1948–49 Yorkshire Cup Final during the 1948–49 season at Headingley on Saturday 30 October 1948, in front of a crowd of 31,393, and he played loose forward in the 5–22 defeat by Huddersfield in the 1950–51 Yorkshire Cup Final during the 1950–51 season at Headingley on Saturday 4 November 1950, in front of a crowd of 28,610.

=== Club career ===
Frank Mugglestone made his début for Bradford Northern and played loose forward in the 31-0 victory over Bramley at Odsal Stadium, Bradford on 2 December 1941, he played on the afternoon his wedding day, and scored 3-goals, in the 30-3 victory over Bramley at Odsal Stadium, Bradford on Saturday 9 November 1946, following the signing of Hagan Evans by the chairman of Bradford Northern; Harry Hornby, Mugglestone was omitted from Bradford Northern's 8–4 victory over Leeds in the 1947 Challenge Cup Final during the 1946-47 season at Wembley Stadium, London on Saturday 3 May 1947, he played his last match for Bradford Northern in the 24-16 victory over Bramley at Odsal Stadium, Bradford on 11 June 1947 (the 1946–47 season was extended due to the harsh winter of 1946–47 in the United Kingdom), he was transferred from Bradford Northern to Castleford, he made his début for Castleford in the 13-14 defeat by Wakefield Trinity at Wheldon Road, Castleford on 30 August 1947, and he played his last match for Castleford in the 10-23 defeat by Widnes at Wheldon Road, Castleford on 29 September 1951.

== Genealogical information ==
Frank Mugglestone's marriage to Violetta M. "Betty" (née Fletcher, a drama teacher) was registered in 1946 in Bradford district. They married at Bradford Cathedral on Saturday November, 9th 1946. After the ceremony he played for Bradford Northern, and scored 3-goals. They had two children: Philippa Mugglestone and Anne F. Mugglestone (birth registered in 1951 (age 73–74) in Wakefield district).
