= 1947–48 Challenge Cup =

Rugby league competition

- Duration: 5 Rounds
- Number of teams: 32
- Broadcast partners: BBC TV
- Winners: Wigan
- Runners-up: Bradford Northern
- Lance Todd Trophy: Frank Whitcombe

The 1947–48 Challenge Cup was the 47th staging of rugby league's oldest knockout competition, the Challenge Cup.

The final was contested by Wigan and Bradford Northern at Wembley Stadium, and was the first ever rugby league match to be televised. Wigan won the match 8–3, with Bradford's Frank Whitcombe receiving the Lance Todd Trophy – the first time the trophy had been awarded to a player on the losing team.

== First round ==
Date	Team One	Score One	Team Two	Score Two
07 Feb	Barrow	18	Halifax	4
07 Feb	Batley	0	Dewsbury	2
07 Feb	Bramley	3	Vine Tavern	3
07 Feb	Featherstone Rovers	3	Leigh	18
07 Feb	Huddersfield	6	Bradford Northern	2
07 Feb	Hull FC	23	Swinton	2
07 Feb	Hull Kingston Rovers	12	Oldham	5
07 Feb	Keighley	11	Risehow & Gillhead	0
07 Feb	Leeds	23	York	9
07 Feb	Liverpool	0	Belle Vue Rangers	9
07 Feb	Rochdale Hornets	13	Pemberton Rovers	0
07 Feb	St Helens	48	Buslingthorpe	0
07 Feb	Salford	2	Wakefield Trinity	13
07 Feb	Warrington	10	Workington Town	0
07 Feb	Widnes	5	Hunslet	3
07 Feb	Wigan	27	Castleford	0
12 Feb	Pemberton Rovers	0	Rochdale Hornets	11
14 Feb	Belle Vue Rangers	10	Liverpool	8
14 Feb	Bradford Northern	15	Huddersfield	2
14 Feb	Buslingthorpe	2	St Helens	13
14 Feb	Castleford	7	Wigan	19
14 Feb	Dewsbury	10	Batley	4
14 Feb	Halifax	17	Barrow	4
14 Feb	Hunslet	5	Widnes	3
14 Feb	Leigh	10	Featherstone Rovers	6
14 Feb	Oldham	22	Hull Kingston Rovers	4
14 Feb	Risehow & Gillhead	10	Keighley	2
14 Feb	Swinton	12	Hull FC	2
14 Feb	Vine Tavern	6	Bramley	17
14 Feb	Wakefield Trinity	20	Salford	15
14 Feb	Workington Town	0	Warrington	7
14 Feb	York	0	Leeds	13
19 Feb	Widnes	0	Hunslet	3
21 Feb	Bramley	10	Vine Tavern	2

== Second round ==
Date	Team One	Score One	Team Two	Score Two
28 Feb	Barrow	2	Keighley	6
28 Feb	Dewsbury	2	Hunslet	2
28 Feb	Hull FC	22	Bramley	0
28 Feb	Oldham	5	St Helens	0
28 Feb	Rochdale Hornets	3	Belle Vue Rangers	2
28 Feb	Wakefield Trinity	3	Bradford Northern	3
28 Feb	Warrington	8	Leigh	2
28 Feb	Wigan	17	Leeds	3
06 Mar	Bradford Northern	9	Wakefield Trinity	2
06 Mar	Hunslet	11	Dewsbury	0

== Quarter-finals ==
Date	Team One	Score One	Team Two	Score Two
13 Mar	Bradford Northern	30	Oldham	0
13 Mar	Hunslet	5	Hull FC	0
13 Mar	Keighley	4	Rochdale Hornets	6
13 Mar	Warrington	10	Wigan	13

== Semi-finals ==
3 April 1948

Hunslet	7 – 14	Bradford Northern

Headingley, Leeds

3 April 1948

Rochdale Hornets	0 – 11	Wigan
	Report

Station Road, Swinton

== Final ==
1 May 1948

Wigan	8 – 3	Bradford Northern
Try: Hilton, Barton; Goal: Ward	Report	Try: Edwards

Wembley Stadium, London
Attendance: 91,465
Referee: George Phillips (Widnes)
Player of the Match: Frank Whitcombe

FB	1	Martin Ryan
RW	2	Gordon Ratcliffe
RC	3	Ted Ward
LC	4	Ernie Ashcroft
LW	5	Jack Hilton
SO	6	Cecil Mountford
SH	7	Tommy Bradshaw
PR	8	Ken Gee
HK	9	Joe Egan (c)
PR	10	Frank Barton
SR	11	Les White
SR	12	Billy Blan
LF	13	Bill Hudson
Coach:
Jim Sullivan

FB	1	Billy Leake
RW	2	Eric Batten
RC	3	Des Case
LC	4	Ernest Ward (c)
LW	5	Alan Edwards
SO	6	Willie Davies
SH	7	Donald Ward
PR	8	Frank Whitcombe
HK	9	Vic Darlison
PR	10	Herbert Smith
SR	11	Barry Tyler
SR	12	Trevor Foster
LF	13	Ken Traill
Coach:
Dai Rees

== Coverage ==
The final was broadcast live on BBC television, with George Duckworth providing commentary, and was the first time a rugby league match had ever been televised. The match was only broadcast to viewers in the London area, as the first television transmitter in the North of England was not completed until 1951.
