= Vic Darlison =

English rugby league footballer (1916–1982)

- Vic Darlison (standing) and Willie Davies (squating) of Bradford Northern's 1944–45 season Championship First Division winning team

Personal information
- Full name: Victor Darlison
- Born: 7 April 1916 Pontefract, England
- Died: second ¼ 1982 c. 65–66 Pontefract district, England

Playing information
- Position: Hooker, Loose forward
Club
Years	Team	Pld	T	G	FG	P
1936–40	Featherstone Rovers	51	2	0	0	6
1938–39	Wigan	20	0	0	0	0
1940–Sep 43	Wakefield Trinity	77	0	2	0	4
≤1943–≥50	Bradford Northern	249	1
1944/45	→Featherstone Rovers (guest)	1
	→Castleford (guest)
	Total	398	3	2	0	10

Victor "Vic" Darlison (7 April 1916 – second 1/4 1982) was an English professional rugby league footballer who played in the 1930s, 1940s and 1950s. He played at club level for Goole ARLFC|ARLFC, Featherstone Rovers (two spells, including the second as a World War II guest), Castleford, Wigan, Wakefield Trinity and Bradford Northern, as a hooker or loose forward.

== Background ==
Vic Darlison was born in Pontefract, West Riding of Yorkshire, England, and he died aged c. 65–66 in Pontefract district, West Yorkshire, England.

== Playing career ==
=== Championship final appearances ===
Vic Darlison played in Bradford Northern's 26–20 aggregate victory over Halifax in the Championship First Division Final during the 1944–45 season, the 2–9 defeat at Thrum Hall, Halifax, and the 24–11 victory at Odsal Stadium, Bradford.

=== Challenge Cup Final appearances ===
Vic Darlison played hooker in Bradford Northern's 8–3 aggregate victory over Wigan in the 1943–44 Challenge Cup Final during the 1943–44 season; the 0–3 defeat at Central Park, Wigan on Saturday 15 April 1944, in front of a crowd of 22,000, and the 8–0 victory at Odsal Stadium, Bradford on Saturday 22 April 1944, in front of a crowd of 30,000, played hooker in the 9–13 aggregate defeat by Huddersfield in the 1944–45 Challenge Cup Final during the 1944–45 season; the 4–7 defeat at Fartown Ground, Huddersfield on Saturday 28 April 1945, in front of a crowd of 9,041, and the 5–6 defeat at Odsal Stadium, Bradford on Saturday 5 May 1945 (three days before Victory in Europe Day), in front of a crowd of 17,500, played hooker in the 8–4 victory over Leeds in the 1946–47 Challenge Cup Final during the 1946–47 season at Wembley Stadium, London on Saturday 3 May 1947, in front of a crowd of 77,605, played hooker in the 3–8 defeat by Wigan in the 1947–48 Challenge Cup Final during the 1947–48 season at Wembley Stadium, London on Saturday 1 May 1948, in front of a crowd of 91,465, and played hooker in the 12–0 victory over Halifax in the 1948–49 Challenge Cup Final during the 1948–49 season at Wembley Stadium, London on Saturday 7 May 1949, in front of a crowd of 95,000.

Bradford Northern played in five of the six Challenge Cup finals between 1944 and 1949, the first two finals; the 1943–44 Challenge Cup Final against Wigan, and the 1944–45 Challenge Cup Final against Huddersfield were played over two-legs, five Bradford Northern players played in all five of these finals, they were; Eric Batten, Vic Darlison, Donald Ward, Ernest Ward, and Frank Whitcombe.

=== County Cup Final appearances ===
Vic Darlison played hooker in Wakefield Trinity's 9–12 defeat by Featherstone Rovers in the 1940–41 Yorkshire Cup Final during the 1939–40 season at Odsal Stadium, Bradford on Saturday 22 June 1940, and played hooker in Bradford Northern's 11–4 victory over Huddersfield in the 1949–50 Yorkshire Cup Final during the 1949–50 season at Headingley, Leeds on Saturday 29 October 1949.

=== Club career ===
Vic Darlison made his début for Featherstone Rovers on Tuesday 14 April 1936, he played his last match for Featherstone Rovers (in his second spell) during the 1944–45 season, he made his début for Wigan in the 13–10 victory over Oldham at Central Park, Wigan, on Saturday 29 October 1938, he played his last match for Wigan in the 0–10 defeat by Swinton at Station Road on Saturday 15 April 1939, he made his début for Wakefield Trinity during April 1940, he played his last match for Wakefield Trinity during September 1943.

== Genealogical information ==
Darlison's marriage to Mary E. (née Barker) was registered during first 1/4 1943 in Pontefract district, he was the younger brother of the rugby league prop for Featherstone Rovers, and in the mid-1930s for Batley; Oliver Darlison (birth registered second 1/4 1910 in Pontefract district), and the uncle of Oliver Darlison's son, the rugby league footballer for Featherstone Rovers, and in the 1940s and 1950s; Geoffrey C. J. Darlison (birth registered first 1/4 1926 in Pontefract district).
