= Ernest Ward =

English rugby league player and coach (1920–1987)

Personal information
- Born: 30 July 1920 Dewsbury, England
- Died: 9 July 1987 (aged 66)

Playing information
- Position: Fullback, Centre, Second-row
Club
Years	Team	Pld	T	G	FG	P
1936–53	Bradford Northern	395	118	537	5	1438
1953–56	Castleford	78	9	153	1	335
	Total	473	127	690	6	1773
Representative
Years	Team	Pld	T	G	FG	P
1941–52	England	19	2	26		58
1952	British Empire	1		4		8
1954	Combined Nationalities	1		3		6
1946–52	Great Britain	20	4	22		56

Coaching information
Club
Years	Team	Gms	W	D	L	W%
1953–56	Castleford	105	29	5	71	28
- Relatives: Donald Ward (brother)

Ernest Ward (30 July 1920 – 9 July 1987) was an English rugby league footballer who played in the 1940s and 1950s, and coached in the 1950s. He played at representative level for Great Britain, British Empire, Combined Nationalities and England, and at club level for Bradford Northern (captain), and Castleford, as a goal-kicking fullback, centre or second-row, and coached at club level for Castleford. Ernest Ward was a Private in the British Army during World War II.

== Background ==
Ward was born in Dewsbury, West Riding of Yorkshire, England, and he lived in a bungalow in Wyke, Bradford.

== Playing career ==
=== Bradford Northern ===
Ward made 391 appearances for Bradford Northern, scoring 117 tries and 538 goals, for a total of 1427 points, he was inducted into the Bradford Northern/Bradford Bulls Hall of Fame in September 2006.

Ward played in Bradford Northern's 26-20 aggregate victory over Halifax in the Championship Final during the 1944–45 season; the 2–9 defeat at Thrum Hall, Halifax, and the 24–11 victory at Odsal Stadium, Bradford.

Ward played in Bradford Northern's 8–3 aggregate victory over Wigan in the 1943–44 Challenge Cup Final during the 1943–44 season; the 0–3 defeat at Central Park, Wigan on Saturday 15 April 1944, and the 8–0 victory at Odsal Stadium, Bradford on Saturday 22 April 1944, played and scored 2 conversions in the 8–4 victory over Leeds in the 1946–47 Challenge Cup Final during the 1946–47 season at Wembley Stadium, London on Saturday 3 May 1947, played at centre and was captain in the 3–8 defeat by Wigan in the 1947–48 Challenge Cup Final during the 1947–48 season at Wembley Stadium, London on Saturday 1 May 1948, and played, and was man of the match winning the Lance Todd Trophy in Bradford Northern's 12–0 victory over Halifax in the 1948–49 Challenge Cup Final during the 1948–49 season at Wembley Stadium, London on Saturday 7 May 1949.

Bradford Northern played in five of the six Challenge Cup finals between 1944 and 1949, the first two finals; the 1943–44 Challenge Cup Final against Wigan, and the 1944–45 Challenge Cup Final against Huddersfield were played over two-legs, five Bradford Northern players played in all five of these finals, they were; Eric Batten, Vic Darlison, Donald Ward, Ernest Ward, and Frank Whitcombe.

Ward played in Bradford Northern's 5–2 victory over Wakefield Trinity in the 1945–46 Yorkshire Cup Final during the 1945–46 season at Thrum Hall, Halifax on Saturday 3 November 1945, played at centre in the 18–9 victory over Castleford in the 1948–49 Yorkshire Cup Final during the 1948–49 season at Headingley, Leeds on Saturday 30 October 1948, and played at centre and scored 4-conversions in the 11–4 victory over Huddersfield in the 1949–50 Yorkshire Cup Final during the 1949–50 season at Headingley, Leeds on Saturday 29 October 1949.

=== Other notable matches ===
Ernest Ward played fullback for Northern Command XIII against a Rugby League XIII at Thrum Hall, Halifax on Saturday 21 March 1942.

=== International honours ===
Ward won caps for England while at Bradford Northern in 1941 against Wales, in 1945 against Wales (2 matches), in 1946 against France (2 matches), and Wales (2 matches), in 1947 against France, and Wales, in 1948 against France (2 matches), in 1949 against Wales, and France (2 matches), in 1950 against Wales (2 matches), and France, in 1952 against Other Nationalities (2 matches), and Wales, won caps for Wales while at Bradford Northern in 1946 against France, in 1947 against France, England, New Zealand, France, and England, in 1948 against France, England, France, and Australia, in 1949 against England, and France, and in 1951 against Other Nationalities (2 matches), represented British Empire while at Bradford Northern in 1952 against New Zealand, and won caps for Great Britain while at Bradford Northern in 1946 against Australia (3 matches), and New Zealand, in 1947 against New Zealand (2 matches), in 1948 against Australia (3 matches), in 1950 against Australia (3 matches), and New Zealand (2 matches), in 1951 against New Zealand (3 matches), and in 1952 against Australia (3 matches).

== Coaching career ==
Ernest Ward was the coach of Castleford, his first game in charge was on Saturday 7 November 1953, and his last game in charge was on Saturday 7 April 1956.

== Personal life ==
Ernest Ward was the younger brother of the rugby league footballer; Donald Ward.

== Death and legacy ==
Ward died in July 1987, aged 66. The Ernest Ward Memorial Trophy was created in his honour, and was awarded annually to British-based players who had given outstanding service to rugby league over the year.

Ernest Ward, has been included in Bradford's 'Millennium Masters', 'Bull Masters', and in August 2007 he was named in the 'Team of the Century'. Only six players have been included in all three lists, they are; Karl Fairbank, Trevor Foster, James Lowes, Keith Mumby, Robbie Paul, and Ernest Ward.
