= Frank Trott =

Welsh rugby union footballer

Richard 'Frank' Trott (14 March 1915, in Cardiff – 28 January 1987) was a Welsh rugby union footballer of the 1930s and 1940s who played 205 rugby union (RU) games for Cardiff RFC, and represented Wales. He played Fullback and won 8 caps. his first against England v Wales at Twickenham, 17 Jan 1948 and his last against France v Wales at Colombes, 26 March 1949.

When his playing days were over Trott became Honorary Secretary to Cardiff RFC for many years.

== Genealogical information ==
Frank Trott was Cousin to Cardiff RFC and Great Britain Prop Frank Whitcombe.
