= Barry Tyler =

English rugby union & league player

Personal information
- Full name: Barry Tyler
- Born: c. 1924 unknown

Playing information
- Height: 6 ft 2 in (1.88 m)

Rugby union
Club
Years	Team	Pld	T	G	FG	P
	Coventry R.F.C.
	Nuneaton R.F.C.
	Total	0	0	0	0	0

Rugby league
- Position: Second-row
Club
Years	Team	Pld	T	G	FG	P
1946–55	Bradford Northern	322	22	1	0	68
1955–57	Doncaster RLFC	29	4	0	0	12
	Total	351	26	1	0	80

Barry Tyler (born c. 1924) is a former rugby union and professional rugby league footballer who played in the 1940s and 1950s. He played club level rugby union (RU) for Coventry R.F.C. and Nuneaton R.F.C., and club level rugby league (RL) for Bradford Northern and Doncaster, as a second-row.

== Playing career ==
=== Championship final appearances ===
Barry Tyler played at second-row in Bradford Northern's 5-15 defeat by Warrington in the Championship Final during the 1947–48 season, and played at second-row in the 6-13 defeat by Wigan in the Championship Final during the 1951–52 season at Leeds Road, Huddersfield on Saturday 10 May 1952, in front of a crowd of 48,684.

=== Challenge Cup Final appearances ===
Barry Tyler played at second-row in Bradford Northern's 8–4 victory over Leeds in the 1946–47 Challenge Cup Final during the 1946–47 season at Wembley Stadium, London on Saturday 3 May 1947, in front of a crowd of 77,605, played at second-row in the 3–8 defeat by Wigan in the 1947–48 Challenge Cup Final during the 1947–48 season at Wembley Stadium, London on Saturday 1 May 1948, in front of a crowd of 91,465, and played at second-row in the 12–0 victory over Halifax in the 1948–49 Challenge Cup Final during the 1948–49 season at Wembley Stadium, London on Saturday 7 May 1949, in front of a crowd of 95,000.

=== County Cup Final appearances ===
Barry Tyler played at second-row in Bradford Northern's 18–9 victory over Castleford in the 1948–49 Yorkshire Cup Final during the 1948–49 season at Headingley, Leeds on Saturday 30 October 1948.

=== Club career ===
Barry Tyler changed code from rugby union to rugby league when he transferred to Bradford Northern in September 1946, and he transferred from Bradford Northern to Doncaster on Thursday 11 August 1955.

== Outside rugby league ==
Tyler joined the army in 1939, and served in India during the Second World War. While in India, Tyler married Mercia Webb, the daughter of a British Indian Army Colonel.
