= Jeff Young (rugby union) =

Welsh rugby union player

- Born: Jeffrey Young; 16 September 1942 Blaengarw, Wales
- Died: 5 October 2005 (aged 63) Harrogate, England
- School: Garw Grammar School
- University: St Luke's College, Exeter
- Occupation(s): schoolmaster Wing commander

Rugby union career
- Position: Hooker
Amateur team(s)
Years	Team	Apps	(Points)
- Blaengarw RFC
–	Royal Air Force		
–	London Welsh RFC		
–	Bridgend RFC		
–	Harrogate RFC		
–	Yorkshire		
International career
Years	Team	Apps	(Points)
1968–1973	Wales	23	(0)
1973	British Isles	1	(0)

Jeffrey Young OBE (16 September 1942 – 3 October 2005) was a Welsh rugby union player who gained 23 caps for Wales as a hooker between 1968 and 1973.

Young was born in Blaengarw and educated at Garw Grammar School and St Luke's College, Exeter. He played five times for the Welsh Secondary Schools XV. A teacher by profession, Young played club rugby for Blaengarw, Harrogate, Bridgend and London Welsh. He also played for the East Wales side that earned a draw with the touring All Blacks in 1967.

He made his debut for Wales against Scotland in Cardiff in 1968, and became the first-choice hooker for Wales, playing in 22 of the next 26 internationals. He played in the Grand Slam winning side of 1971 and made his last international appearance against France in Paris in 1973, after which Bobby Windsor became the first-choice hooker. Young was selected for the British and Irish Lions tour to South Africa in 1968 and played in the first test.

In 1971 he left teaching and joined the R.A.F. and became a Wing Commander, coaching the RAF and British Combined Services on their joint tour to New Zealand with British Police in 1988. In 1991 he became the Welsh Rugby Union's first technical director and later became Director of Rugby at Harrogate. He was awarded the OBE for his services to rugby and the R.A.F. Jeff Young died of Alzheimer's disease in Harrogate in October 2005.
