= Peter Evans (rugby union) =

Wales international rugby union player (1928-2014)

Peter
- Full name: Peter Denzil Evans
- Born: 21 June 1928 Llanelli, Wales
- Died: 22 September 2014 (aged 86) Llanelli, Wales
- School: St Michael's School
- Notable relative: Hagan Evans (brother)

Rugby union career
- Position: Flanker
International career
Years	Team	Apps	(Points)
1951	Wales	2	(0)

Peter Denzil Evans (21 June 1928 — 22 September 2014) was a Welsh international rugby union player.

Born in Llanelli, Evans was the younger brother of rugby league international Hagan Evans and rebuffed several offers to switch codes himself during his career. He attended St Michael's School.

Evans started out with Furnace United and was playing for Llanelli when he gained two Wales caps as a flanker in the 1951 Five Nations. On his debut, against England at Swansea, Evans replaced an injured Allen Forward, then lost his place for the following fixture at Murrayfield when Forward returned. Wales lost heavily to Scotland and Forward was amongst the players dropped, with Evans travelling to Paris for a second cap.

During his time with Llanelli, Evans had two seasons as captain, which included a match against the 1953 All Blacks.

== See also ==
- List of Wales national rugby union players
