= Blaengarw =

Coordinates: 51.624147°N 3.587378°W

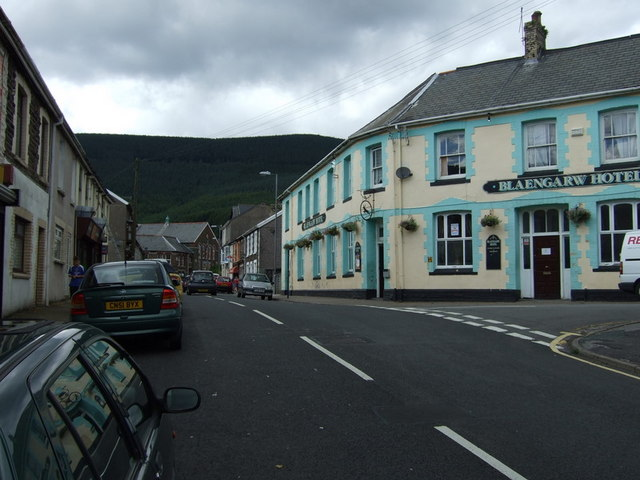

- Location within Bridgend
- Population: 1,789 (2011)
- OS grid reference: SS902928
- Principal area: Bridgend
- Preserved county: Mid Glamorgan
- Country: Wales
- Sovereign state: United Kingdom
- Post town: BRIDGEND
- Postcode district: CF32
- Dialling code: 01656
- Police: South Wales
- Fire: South Wales
- Ambulance: Welsh
- UK Parliament: Rhondda and Ogmore

Blaengarw is the uppermost village in the river valley (Cwm Garw) of the River Garw, in the county borough of Bridgend, Wales.

In the English language Blaengarw means the rugged 'front' or 'head' of the valley. The population of Blaengarw ward according to the 2001 census was 1,895, falling to 1,789 at the 2011 census.

== History ==
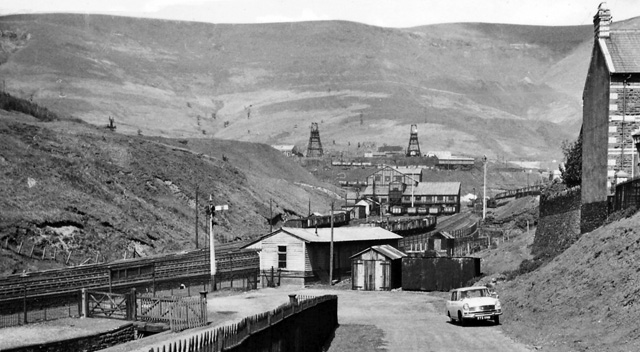
The former Great Western Railway station Blaengarw in 1962.

During the 19th and 20th centuries the village served as a mining town for the coal miners of the Garw Valley section of the South Wales coalfield. Built in 1893, the Blaengarw Workmen's Hall is a testament to this history and is still used today as a community and entertainment centre. The Welsh poet Daniel James (Gwyrosydd) composed the popular Welsh hymn Calon Lân while working as a coal miner at the Blaengarw pit. The town was a flashpoint of public disorder during the UK miners' strike (1984–1985).

== Governance ==
Formerly a separate ward electing one councillor, since 2022 Blaengarw has formed part of the three-member Garw Valley ward.

== Time banking ==
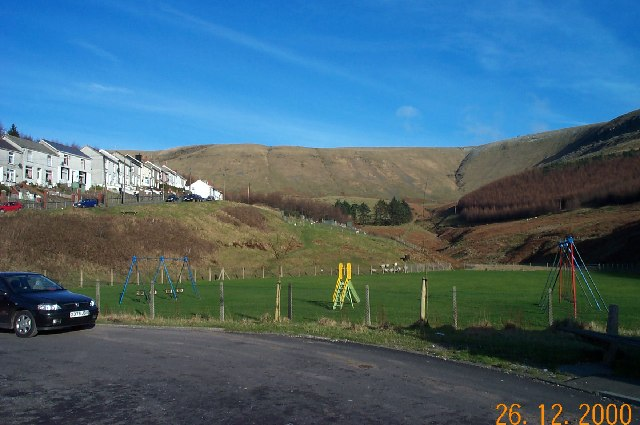
Top of the Garw Valley

Blaengarw is home to the largest Time Bank in Europe the Blaengarw Time Centre, hosted by Creation Group.

The Blaengarw Time Centre is based in Blaengarw Workmen's Hall which was bought by the community in 2000. For every hour spent on community work citizens receive one "Time Credit" which can be used to attend one hour of a social, educational or cultural event. Community assets in the village include a food shop, a community café, a heritage café, a digital inclusion centre, a community library and a sculpture studio. Activities organised by the centre include coffee mornings, arts classes, information technology classes, a youth club, dance and drama workshops, sugar craft and after-school clubs.

== Film ==
The 2001 comedy Very Annie Mary, starring Rachel Griffiths, Jonathan Pryce and Ioan Gruffudd was filmed in the village, as was the 2019 Channel 4 miniseries The Accident.

== Notable people ==
See Category:People from Blaengarw

- Kenneth "Ken" Davies
- Daniel James (Gwyrosydd)
- Dewi James (David James), co-founder of Vivid Entertainment
- Ike Owens
- Brian Plummer, author, dog breeder, originator of the Plummer Terrier
- Jeff Young (rugby player)
