= Ike Owens =

GB & Wales international rugby league & union footballer (1918–1998)

Personal information
- Full name: Isaac Andrew Owens
- Born: 7 November 1918 Pontycymmer, Wales
- Died: 15 October 1998 (aged 79)

Playing information

Rugby union
- Position: Number Eight
Club
| Years | Team | Pld | T | G | FG | P |
|---|---|---|---|---|---|---|
| | Blaengarw RFC |
| | Maesteg RFC |
| | Total | 0 | 0 | 0 | 0 | 0 |

Rugby league
- Position: Loose forward
Club
| Years | Team | Pld | T | G | FG | P |
|---|---|---|---|---|---|---|
| 1943–48 | Leeds |
| 1944–45(loan) | →Oldham | 2 | 0 | 0 | 0 | 0 |
| 1948–49 | Castleford | 7 | 2 | 0 | 0 | 6 |
| 1949–52 | Huddersfield | 127 | 20 | 0 | 0 | 60 |
| | Total | 136 | 22 | 0 | 0 | 66 |
Representative
| Years | Team | Pld | T | G | FG | P |
| 1945–49 | Wales | 12 | 0 | 0 | 0 | 0 |
| 1946 | Great Britain | 4 | 1 | 0 | 0 | 3 |

Isaac Andrew Owens AFM (7 November 1918 – 15 October 1998) was a Welsh rugby union, and professional rugby league footballer who played in the 1940s and 1950s. He played club level rugby union (RU) for Blaengarw RFC (in Blaengarw, Bridgend), and Maesteg RFC, and armed forces rugby union for the Royal Air Force, as a number eight, and representative level rugby league (RL) for Great Britain and Wales, and at club level for Leeds, Castleford, and Huddersfield, as a loose forward.

== Playing career ==
=== Rugby union ===
Owens, who was born in Pontycymer near Bridgend, originally played rugby union for Blaengarw RFC, before switching to Maesteg. Although switching to rugby league in 1943 Owens was part of the 1945 British Empire Forces rugby union team that played France, during a period when the strict guideline between amateur and professional were relaxed. Owens, playing at number eight, scored two tries in that game helping the British to a 27–6 victory.

=== Rugby league ===
Owens changed codes in 1943 and joined Leeds. He also played two games for Oldham RLFC as a wartime guest.

His international début came in March 1945 when he won the first of 12 caps for Wales in an 18–8 defeat by England at Central Park, Wigan.

In 1946 he was selected for the Great Britain, and played in all four tests (three against Australia and one against New Zealand) on the tour to Australia and New Zealand scoring a try in the third test against Australia.1946 Great Britain Lions tour. Following his return from the tour there was speculation that Owens was going to move to Australia to play for Newtown but Owens turned the move down.

Owens played in one Challenge Cup final being on the losing side at Leeds lost 4–8 defeat by Bradford Northern in the 1946–47 Challenge Cup Final at Wembley Stadium, London on Saturday 3 May 1947.

Before the start of the 1948–49 season Owens asked for a transfer from Leeds and in October 1948 he signed for Castleford for a fee of £2,750. Owens only played seven games for Castleford before moving to Huddersfield in January 1949, again for a fee of £2,750.

During Owens' second season with Huddersfield (1949–50), the team reached both the Championship Final, and the final of the Yorkshire Cup but lost both; the Championship 2–20 to Wigan and the Cup to 4–11 to Bradford Northern.

At the end of the 1951–52 season Owens retired aged 33, and returned to Wales.

== Wartime service ==
Ike Owens served in the Royal Air Force as a Parachute Jump Instructor during World War II at No. 1 Parachute Training School RAF based at RAF Ringway near Manchester. He was awarded the Air Force Medal in the 1945 Birthday Honours.
