= Arthur Clues =

Former Australia international rugby league footballer

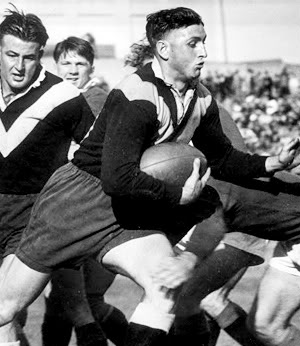
- Clues at Wests

Personal information
- Full name: Arthur Charles Clues
- Born: 2 May 1924 Liverpool, New South Wales, Australia
- Died: 3 October 1998 (aged 74) Leeds, West Yorkshire, England

Playing information
- Height: 183 cm (6 ft 0 in)
- Weight: 96 kg (15 st 2 lb)
- Position: Second-row
Club
Years	Team	Pld	T	G	FG	P
1943–46	Western Suburbs	50	17	0	0	55
1947–54	Leeds	238	74	0	0	222
1954–57	Hunslet	83	12	0	0	36
	Total	371	103	0	0	313
Representative
Years	Team	Pld	T	G	FG	P
1945–46	New South Wales	7	1	0	0	3
1952	British Empire XIII	1	0	0	0	0
1949–55	Other Nationalities	16	2	3	0	12
1946	Australia	3	0	0	0	0

Arthur Clues (2 May 1924 – 3 October 1998) was an Australian professional rugby league footballer who played in the 1940s and 1950s. An Australian international and New South Wales interstate representative second-row forward, he played his club football in Sydney for the Western Suburbs club before moving to England to play for Leeds and Hunslet. Clues has been named amongst the nation's finest footballers of the 20th century.

== Playing career ==
=== Australia ===
Clues played Rugby union for Parramatta at the age of seventeen before moving to rugby league and he was also a capable first-grade cricketer. He has the distinction of scoring a try and a century at both Headingley, and the Sydney Cricket Ground.

Clues joined Wests in 1943 and quickly established himself as a constructive and creative second-rower. By 1946 he was representing at an international level for the Australians against the touring British Lions. He played in all three Tests. Clues is listed on the Australian Players Register as kangaroo No.220.

=== England ===
Lured by the offer of a lucrative contract with Leeds, Clues was the first Australian to join an English club after World War II. Clues played 238 first-class games for Leeds but a dispute with Leeds' management in 1954 ended his career at the club. He played for the British Empire XIII versus New Zealand on Wednesday 23 January 1952 at Stamford Bridge.

Harry Hornby, the chairman, and financial power behind Bradford Northern in the 1940s paid a record fee for Frank Whitcombe. Frank was a hard player during an era when the game was at its toughest. His rivalry with Arthur Clues who played for Leeds was legendary. Their confrontations on the field during the Bradford Northern v Leeds local derby games are part of Rugby League Folklore.

Trevor Foster, MBE, recalled an incident during one of these games in the late 1940s when Clues kicked out violently at Bradford Northern scrum half back Gwylfa Jones. Immediately Frank stood up from the scrum and confronted his reckless action. He ran towards Arthur with both fists clenched Whitcombe drove the full force of his 18 stone frame in to Arthur Clues' chest and pole axed him. Clues could not get his breath and for ten minutes received emergency medical attention in front of the 17,000 Odsal crowd. The referee sent Frank off for his actions while Arthur Clues was carried off on a stretcher and also sent off. In time honoured tradition the two men shook hands after the game to show their mutual respect for each other.

Frank Whitcombe and Arthur Clues became great friends when their playing days were over. They used to spend a lot of time in Whitcombe's Public House "The Kings Head" in Bradford. Needless to say there were no problems.

Clues moved on to Hunslet where he played a further three seasons before retiring in 1957. Unable to represent Australia while playing in England, Clues was selected to represent Other Nationalities on fourteen occasions between 1949 and 1955.

Clues did not return to Australia at the end of his playing career, instead he chose to stay in Leeds and open a sports store. He died in 1998.

== Accolades ==
In September 2004 Clues was named in the second row of the Western Suburbs Magpies team of the century. In February 2008, he was named in the list of Australia's 100 Greatest Players (1908–2007) which was commissioned by the NRL, and ARL to celebrate the code's centenary year in Australia.

== Sources ==
- Alan Whiticker & Glen Hudson (2007). The Encyclopedia of Rugby League Players. Wetherill Park, New South Wales: Gary Allen Pty Ltd. p. 92. ISBN 978-1-877082-93-1.
- Malcolm Andrews (1992). ABC of Rugby League. Sydney, New South Wales: Australian Broadcasting Corporation Enterprises. p. 86. ISBN 0-7333-0176-2.
