= Norman Guest =

English rugby league footballer

Personal information
- Born: c. 1919–21
- Died: c. 2010 (aged c. 89–91)

Playing information
- Position: Fullback, Centre
Club
Years	Team	Pld	T	G	FG	P
1938–50	Castleford	139	41	76	5	285
1939/40	→ Featherstone Rovers (guest)	5	4	1		14
1943/44	→ Featherstone Rovers (guest)	4
≥1939–≤45	→ Batley (guest)
1950	Barrow
1951–55	Doncaster	119	12	44	1	126
	Total	267	57	121	6	425
Representative
Years	Team	Pld	T	G	FG	P
1949	Yorkshire	1	0	0	0	0

Norman Guest (c. 1919-21 – c. 2010) was a professional rugby league footballer who played in the 1930s, 1940s and 1950s. He played at representative level for Yorkshire, and at club level for Castleford, Featherstone Rovers (two spells as a World War II guest), Batley (World War II guest), Barrow and Doncaster, as a fullback, or centre.

== Playing career ==
=== County honours ===
Norman Guest won a cap for Yorkshire while at Castleford, he played at centre in the 13-22 defeat by Lancashire at Warrington's stadium on Wednesday 5 October 1949.

=== County League appearances ===
Norman Guest played in Castleford's victory in the Yorkshire League during the 1938–39 season.

=== Notable tour matches ===
Norman Guest played in Castleford's 3-17 defeat by New Zealand during the 1947–48 season at Wheldon Road, Castleford on Wednesday 8 October 1947.

=== Club career ===
Norman Guest made his début for Featherstone Rovers on Saturday 2 December 1939. In August 1951, Guest played in the inaugural match for Doncaster, a 10–3 win over Wakefield Trinity, in which he became the first try scorer for the club.

== Personal life ==
Norman Guest was the father of the rugby league footballer who played in the 1960s and 1970s for Castleford and Doncaster; Ian Guest.
