= Leslie Haughey =

English rugby league footballer

Playing information
Club
| Years | Team | Pld | T | G | FG | P |
|---|---|---|---|---|---|---|
| 1949–57 | Castleford | 173 | 3 | 0 | 0 | 9 |

Leslie Haughey is a former professional rugby league footballer who played in the 1940s and 1950s. He played at club level for Castleford.
