= Dyl Harris =

Welsh rugby league player (1926–1988)

Dilwyn Harris
Personal information
- Full name: Dilwyn Edward John Harris
- Born: 22 October 1924 Maesteg, Wales
- Died: 30 April 1988 (aged 63)

Playing information
- Position: Prop
Club
Years	Team	Pld	T	G	FG	P
1946–51	Castleford	133	6	0	0	18
Representative
Years	Team	Pld	T	G	FG	P
1947–51	Wales	4

Dilwyn Edward John Harris (22 October 1924 – 30 April 1988) was a Welsh professional rugby league footballer who played in the 1940s and 1950s. He played at representative level for Wales, and at club level for Castleford, as a prop.

== International honours ==
Harris won four caps for Wales in 1947–1951 while at Castleford.
