= Charles Staines =

Wales international rugby league footballer

Charlie Staines
Personal information
- Full name: Charles Staines
- Born: Wales

Playing information
- Position: Second-row
Club
Years	Team	Pld	T	G	FG	P
1937–51	Castleford	170	36	83	0	274
Representative
Years	Team	Pld	T	G	FG	P
1948	Wales	1

Charles "Charlie" Staines (birth unknown – death unknown) was a Welsh professional rugby league footballer who played in the 1930s, 1940s and 1950s. He played at representative level for Wales, and at club level for Castleford, as a second-row.

== Playing career ==
=== International honours ===
Charlie Staines won a cap for Wales while at Castleford on 22 September 1948 in the 5-11 defeat by England at Central Park, Wigan.

=== County League appearances ===
Charlie Staines played in Castleford's victory in the Yorkshire League during the 1938–39 season.
