= Jack Kitching =

English rugby league footballer and coach (c.1920–1993)

- Kitching photographed in February 1951 while playing for Castleford

Personal information
- Born: c. 1920 Bradford, West Yorkshire, England
- Died: 30 July 1993 (aged 73) Bottesford, Lincolnshire, England

Playing information
- Position: Centre
Club
Years	Team	Pld	T	G	FG	P
1944–48	Bradford Northern	171	48	2		148
1948	Whitehaven
1949–50	Bradford Northern
1950–52	Castleford	28	11	0	0	33
	Total	199	59	2	0	181
Representative
Years	Team	Pld	T	G	FG	P
1945–47	England	4	0	0	0	0
1946	Great Britain	1	0	0	0	0

Coaching information
Club
Years	Team	Gms	W	D	L	W%
1948	Whitehaven
1951–52	Castleford	41	10	1	30	24
	Total	41	10	1	30	24

Jack Kitching was an English professional rugby league footballer who played in the 1940s and 1950s, and coached in the 1950s. He played at representative level for Great Britain and England, and at club level for Bradford Northern, Whitehaven and Castleford, as a centre, and coached at club level for Castleford.

== Early life ==
Kitching was born in Bradford. He was educated at Thornton Grammar School, Bradford and Borough Road College, London, where he qualified as a teacher. From 1940–45 he served in the Royal Navy.

== Rugby career ==
Kitching's rugby league career started in 1944 when he signed for Bradford Northern, having previously played for Bradford rugby union club.

Kitching was three times a Challenge Cup winner. He played in the second leg of the 1943–44 Challenge Cup final as Bradford beat Wigan 8–0 (winning 8–3 on aggregate) at Odsal Stadium on 22 April 1944. The second win was when Bradford beat Leeds 8–4 at Wembley Stadium in the 1946–47 Challenge Cup final on 3 May 1947. In between Kitching played in both legs of the 1944–45 Challenge Cup final as Bradford lost 13–9 on aggregate to Huddersfield. The third was in 1949 as Bradford beat Halifax 12–0 at Wembley on 7 May.

While at Bradford Kitching won four caps for England between 1945 and 1947, three caps against Wales (1945, 46 and 47) and a single cap against France in 1946. In 1946 he was selected for the Great Britain team to tour Australia and New Zealand, and played in one test against Australia. During the first test of the tour he was sent off for striking Australian captain, Joe Jorgenson. Kitching later accused Jorgensen of biting him prior to his dismissal, an allegation that was not sustained.

In June 1948 Kitching accepted an offer to become manager at new club, Whitehaven who were about to start their inaugural season in the league. A transfer fee of £2,500 was agreed between Whitehaven and Bradford enabling Kitching to also play for as well as manage Whitehaven in July 1948; however in December of the same year Kitching resigned as manager citing personal reasons and the inability to find a family home in Whitehaven, and returned as a player to Bradford. In October 1950 he was transferred to Castleford for a fee of £1,000. From February 1951 he was captain of the team. Between August 1951 to April 1952, he was coach of the Castleford club.

== Teaching career ==
Away from rugby, Kitching taught geography and physical education. At the time of the 1950 General Election he was teaching at Pudsey Grammar School. He later became deputy head teacher at High Ridge School in Scunthorpe.

== Political career ==
He was the Liberal Party candidate for Bradford North at the 1950 General Election. He finished third and did not stand for parliament again.

General Election 1950: Bradford North
Party	Candidate	Votes	%	±%
Conservative	William Johnson Taylor	20,628	45.7	+9.5
Labour	Muriel Edith Wallhead-Nichol	18,517	41.0	−2.6
Liberal	Jack Kitching	5,985	13.3	−6.8
Majority		2,111	4.7	
Turnout			87.7	
Conservative gain from Labour		Swing	+6.0	

== Death ==
Kitching died of cancer at his home in Bottesford, Lincolnshire on 30 July 1993, aged 73. He was buried at St Giles Church, Scartho along with his two-year old granddaughter Mishka, who had died from cerebral palsy on the same day.
