= Donald Ward =

English RL coach and former professional rugby league footballer

Personal information
- Born: c. second ¼ 1914 Dewsbury, England
- Died: unknown

Playing information
- Position: Stand-off, Scrum-half
Club
| Years | Team | Pld | T | G | FG | P |
|---|---|---|---|---|---|---|
| ≤1939–≤39 | Dewsbury |
| ≤1939–≥48 | Bradford Northern | 232 |
| ≥1950–≥50 | Celtic de Paris |
| | Total | 232 | 0 | 0 | 0 | 0 |

Coaching information
Club
| Years | Team | Gms | W | D | L | W% |
| | Celtic de Paris | 0 | 0 | 0 | 0 |
- Relatives: Ernest Ward (brother)

Donald Ward (born c. 1914 – death unknown) was an English professional rugby league footballer who played in the 1930s and 1940s, and coached in the 1950s. He played at club level for Dewsbury, Bradford Northern, Celtic de Paris and Wyke ARLFC, as a stand-off or scrum-half, and coached at club level for Celtic de Paris and Wyke ARLFC.

== Background ==
Donald Ward was born in Dewsbury, West Riding of Yorkshire, England.

== Playing career ==
=== Challenge Cup Final appearances ===
Donald Ward played scrum-half in Bradford Northern's 8-3 aggregate victory over Wigan in the 1943–44 Challenge Cup Final during the 1943–44 season; the 0–3 defeat at Central Park, Wigan on Saturday 15 April 1944, and the 8–0 victory at Odsal Stadium, Bradford on Saturday 22 April 1944, played scrum-half in the 8–4 victory over Leeds in the 1946–47 Challenge Cup Final during the 1946–47 season at Wembley Stadium, London on Saturday 3 May 1947, played scrum-half in the 3–8 defeat by Wigan in the 1947–48 Challenge Cup Final during the 1947–48 season at Wembley Stadium, London on Saturday 1 May 1948, and played scrum-half in the 12–0 victory over Halifax in the 1948–49 Challenge Cup Final during the 1948–49 season at Wembley Stadium, London on Saturday 7 May 1949.

Bradford Northern played in five of the six Challenge Cup finals between 1944 and 1949, the first two finals; the 1943–44 Challenge Cup Final against Wigan, and the 1944–45 Challenge Cup Final against Huddersfield were played over two-legs, five Bradford Northern players played in all five of these finals, they were; Eric Batten, Vic Darlison, Donald Ward, Ernest Ward, and Frank Whitcombe.

== Genealogical information ==
Donald Ward was the older brother of the rugby league footballer; Ernest Ward.
