= Arthur Bastow =

English rugby league footballer

Personal information
- Full name: Arthur Bastow

Playing information
Club
Years	Team	Pld	T	G	FG	P
1945–52	Castleford	140	28			84

Arthur Bastow is a former professional rugby league footballer who played in the 1940s and 1950s. He played at club level for Castleford.
