= Rosebank, Prince Edward Island =

Coordinates: 46.793°N 64.158°W

Location of Rosebank in Prince Edward Island

Rosebank is a settlement in Prince Edward Island. It is an unincorporated area, located in Queens County in the central portion of Prince Edward Island, S. of Charlottetown.

== History of the name ==
The official history of the geographic name Rosebank:

Rosebank (Sett.) was adopted 18 November 1966 on 11L/3h. Status changed to Local ity when it became part of the Community of Southport in 1972. Rosebank (Locali ty) became part of the Town of Stratford on 1 April 1995. Name confirmed 17 June 1996 on 11L/3.

Source: http://www.gov.pe.ca/placefinder/index.php3?city=Rosebank
