= Herbert Smith (rugby league, born 1915) =

English rugby league footballer

Personal information
- Full name: Herbert Smith
- Born: third 1/4 1915 Dewsbury, England

Playing information
- Height: 5 ft 10 in (178 cm)
- Weight: 16 st 0 lb (102 kg)
- Position: Wing, Centre, Prop, Second-row
Club
Years	Team	Pld	T	G	FG	P
1935	Castleford	3	0	0	0	0
1935–40	Bramley
≥1940–≤45	Batley (guest)
1942–≥46	Bradford Northern
	Total	3	0	0	0	0

Herbert Smith (birth registered third 1/4 1915 – death uncertain) was an English professional rugby league footballer who played in the 1930s and 1940s. He played at club level for Batley Shamrocks, Castleford, Bramley, Batley (World War II guest), and Bradford Northern, as a wing, centre, prop, or second-row. Herbert Smith served with army during World War II, in 1944 he was selected for the R.L. Services XV, but was unable to play due to training for the Normandy landings.

== Background ==
Herbert Smith's birth was registered in Dewsbury, West Riding of Yorkshire, England.

== Playing career ==
=== Challenge Cup Final appearances ===
Herbert Smith played at prop in Bradford Northern's 8-4 victory over Leeds in the 1946–47 Challenge Cup Final during the 1946–47 season at Wembley Stadium, London on Saturday 3 May 1947, in front of a crowd of 77,605.

=== Club career ===
Herbert Smith made his dêbut for Castleford as a centre on Monday 8 April 1935, he played on the wing on Saturday 13 April 1935, and he played his last match for Castleford as a centre on Saturday 27 April 1935.

== Genealogical information ==
Herbert was the son of jack (John) and katie. Also known to have 1 brother and 1 sister.

Herbert was a father to 4 children
