= Jimmy Jones (rugby league) =

English rugby league footballer

Personal information
- Full name: James Jones

Playing information
Club
Years	Team	Pld	T	G	FG	P
1947–51	Castleford	119	0	0	0	0

Jimmy Jones is a former professional rugby league footballer who played in the 1940s and 1950s. He played at club level for Castleford.
