= Arthur Fisher (rugby league) =

English rugby league footballer

Playing information
Club
Years	Team	Pld	T	G	FG	P
1947–52	Castleford	90	20	2	0	64

Arthur Fisher is a former professional rugby league footballer who played in the 1940s and 1950s. He played at club level for Castleford.
