= Ken Traill =

English rugby league coach (1926–2002)

Personal information
- Full name: Kenneth Traill
- Born: 7 September 1926 West Wylam, England
- Died: 25 March 2002 (aged 75) Guiseley, Leeds, England

Playing information
- Position: Loose forward
Club
Years	Team	Pld	T	G	FG	P
1944–47	Hunslet
1947–55	Bradford Northern	315	37	3	0	117
1955–57	Halifax	90
1957–59	Wakefield Trinity	28	1	0	0	3
	Total	433	38	3	0	120
Representative
Years	Team	Pld	T	G	FG	P
1950–59	Yorkshire
1949–55	England	3	1	0	0	3
1950–54	Great Britain	8	1	0	0	3

Coaching information
Club
Years	Team	Gms	W	D	L	W%
1958–70	Wakefield Trinity

Kenneth Traill (7 September 1926 – 25 March 2002) was an English professional rugby league footballer who played in the 1940s and 1950s, and coached in the 1950s, 1960s and 1970s. He played at representative level for Great Britain, England and Yorkshire, and at club level for Hunslet, Bradford Northern, Halifax and Wakefield Trinity, as a loose forward, and coached at club level for Wakefield Trinity.

== Background ==
Traill was born in West Wylam, Northumberland, England, he was the son of the former Hunslet and Keighley rugby league footballer; Jim Traill. Traill attended Hunslet Carr School, he and his wife Joan were the landlord and lady of the Prospect Inn, 93 Moor Road, Hunslet, Leeds, He died in March 2002, aged 75, in Guiseley, West Yorkshire, England.

== Playing career ==
Traill made his debut for Hunslet against Oldham at Parkside, Hunslet on Saturday 26 February 1944. His career at Hunslet was interrupted by RAF national service.

=== Bradford Northern ===
He joined Bradford Northern in May 1947, making his début against Wakefield Trinity.

Traill played loose forward in Bradford Northern's 3–8 defeat by Wigan in the 1947–48 Challenge Cup Final during 1947–48 season at Wembley Stadium, London on Saturday 1 May 1948, in front of a crowd of 91,465, and played in the 12–0 victory over Halifax in the 1948–49 Challenge Cup Final during the 1948–49 season on Saturday 7 May 1949, in front of a crowd of 95,050.

He also played in Bradford Northern's 11–4 victory over Huddersfield in the 1949–50 Yorkshire Cup Final during the 1949–50 season at Headingley Rugby Stadium, Leeds on Saturday 29 October 1949.

Traill played loose forward in Bradford Northern's 6–13 defeat by Wigan in the Rugby Football League Championship Final during the 1951–52 season at Leeds Road, Huddersfield on Saturday 10 May 1952.

He left Bradford Northern having played 315 matches for the Bradford Northern in ten seasons, scoring 37 tries and kicking three goals.

=== Halifax ===
He joined Halifax for the 1955–56 season. His last match was against Wakefield Trinity.

=== Wakefield Trinity ===
In 1957 Triall moved again, joining Wakefield Trinity. He was appointed as the player-coach the following year.

He was the player-coach during Wakefield Trinity's 20–24 defeat by Leeds in the 1958–59 Yorkshire Cup Final during the 1958–59 season at Odsal Stadium, Bradford on Saturday 18 October 1958.

=== Representative honours ===
Traill was first selected for England in 1949, playing against France.

He was selected for Yorkshire in 1950, however officials withdrew him from the side when they learned he was born in Northumberland, England. He was selected to represent Great Britain in 1950, playing in two matches against New Zealand, and in 1951, again against New Zealand.

He played in three matches for Great Britain in 1952, against Australia.

Traill was again selected for England in 1953, playing against Wales and Other Nationalities, and again in 1955, playing against Other Nationalities. In 1954 he played for Great Britain against both New Zealand and Australia. He also played in one game against France for Great Britain.

He was selected for Yorkshire County XIII during the 1958–59 season.

== Coaching career ==
After retiring as a player, Traill continued to coach Wakefield Trinity.

Wakefield Trinity defeated Hull F.C. 38–5 in the 1959–60 Challenge Cup Final during the 1959–60 season at Wembley Stadium, London on Saturday 14 May 1960, in front of a crowd of 79,773. The following week, on 21 May, the team lost the Championship final to Wigan 3–27.

He was coach in the 16–10 victory over Huddersfield in the 1960–61 Yorkshire Cup Final during the 1960–61 season at Headingley Rugby Stadium, Leeds on Saturday 29 October 1960.

He also coached Wakefield Trinity in the 19–9 victory over Leeds in the 1961–62 Yorkshire Cup Final during the 1961–62 season at Odsal Stadium, Bradford on Saturday 11 November 1961. Later that season, he was the coach during the 12–6 victory over Huddersfield in the 1961–62 Challenge Cup final at Wembley Stadium, London on Saturday 12 May 1962, in front of a crowd of 81,263. The following week they played Huddersfield again, this time losing 5–14 in the 1961–62 season championship final at Odsal Stadium, Bradford on Saturday 19 May 1962.

He was the coach in the 25–10 victory over Wigan in the 1962–63 Challenge Cup Final during the 1962–63 season at Wembley Stadium, London on Saturday 11 May 1963, in front of a crowd of 84,492.

He was coach in the 18–2 victory over Leeds in the 1964–65 Yorkshire Cup Final during the 1964–65 season at Fartown Ground, Huddersfield on Saturday 31 October 1964.

He was the coach in the 21–9 victory over St. Helens in the Championship final replay during the 1966–67 season at Station Road, Swinton on Wednesday 10 May 1967.

Traill coached Wakefield Trinity to a 17–10 victory over Hull Kingston Rovers in the Championship final during the 1967–68 season at Headingley Rugby Stadium, Leeds on Saturday 4 May 1968. The following week, he was the coach in the 10–11 defeat by Leeds in the 1967–68 Challenge Cup "Watersplash" final at Wembley Stadium, London on Saturday 11 May 1968, in front of a crowd of 87,100.

He retired in 1970. During this time, Wakefield Trinity had also won the RFL Yorkshire League in 1958–59, 1959–60, 1961–62 and 1962–63.

== Honours ==
In August 2007 he was named Bradford Northern's Team of the Century.
