= Hagan Evans =

Wales international rugby league footballer (1923–1977

Personal information
- Full name: Thomas Evan Hagan Evans
- Born: 1 August 1923 Wales
- Died: January 1977 (aged 53) London, England

Playing information

Rugby union
Club
| Years | Team | Pld | T | G | FG | P |
|---|---|---|---|---|---|---|
| | Llanelli RFC |

Rugby league
- Position: Loose forward
Club
| Years | Team | Pld | T | G | FG | P |
|---|---|---|---|---|---|---|
| 1947–48 | Bradford Northern | 24 | 5 | 2 | 0 | 19 |
| 1948–50 | Hull FC | 93 | 17 | 6 | 0 | 63 |
| | Dewsbury |
| 1953 | Hull KR | 3 |
| | Total | 120 | 22 | 8 | 0 | 82 |
Representative
| Years | Team | Pld | T | G | FG | P |
| 1947–49 | Wales | 2 |
- Relatives: Peter Evans (brother)

Thomas Evan Hagan Evans (Note: Hagen Evans in some sources) (August 1923 – January 1977) was a Welsh rugby union and professional rugby league footballer who played in the 1940s. He played club level rugby union (RU) for Llanelli RFC, and representative level rugby league (RL) for Wales, and at club level for Bradford Northern, Hull FC, and Hull Kingston Rovers as a loose forward.

== Playing career ==
=== International honours ===
Evans won 2 caps for Wales in 1947–49 while at Bradford Northern and Hull.

=== Challenge Cup Final appearances ===
Evans played loose forward in Bradford Northern's 8–4 victory over Leeds in the 1947 Challenge Cup Final during the 1946–47 season at Wembley Stadium, London on Saturday 3 May 1947.

== Personal life and death ==
Evans' brother, Peter, captained Llanelli RFC, and was capped twice by Wales (RU) in 1951 against England, and France.

Hagan Evans died in London in January 1977, at the age of 53.
