= Eric Batten =

GB Lions & England international rugby league player and coach (1914–1993)

- Eric Batten (Bradford Northern) hurdling over his brother Bob Batten (Leeds) in Bradford Northern's 5–11 defeat by Leeds in the 1947–48 Yorkshire Cup 1^{st} round 1^{st} leg match at Headingley, Leeds on Saturday 13 September 1947.

Personal information
- Full name: Frederick E. Batten
- Born: 13 June 1914 Sculcoates district, Hull, England
- Died: 3 September 1993 (aged 79) Leeds, England

Playing information
- Position: Wing
Club
Years	Team	Pld	T	G	FG	P
1933–36	Wakefield Trinity	41	12	0	0	36
1936–43	Hunslet	177	133	0	0	399
1939/40	→ Featherstone Rovers (guest)	1	2	0	0	6
1940–43	→ Wakefield Trinity (guest)	3	8	0	0	24
1940/41	→ Leeds (guest)	≥1
1942	→ Castleford (guest)	1
1942/43	→ Featherstone Rovers (guest)	1
1942–43	Leeds	24	18	0	0	54
1943–51	Bradford Northern	233	165	0	0	495
1944/45	→ Featherstone Rovers (guest)	2
1951–54	Featherstone Rovers	101	60	0	0	180
	Total		398	0	0	1194
Representative
Years	Team	Pld	T	G	FG	P
1938–48	England	13	6	0		18
1942	Rugby League XIII	1	0	0	0	0
1946–47	Great Britain	4	1	0		3

Coaching information
Club
Years	Team	Gms	W	D	L	W%
1951–56	Featherstone Rovers	210	102	8	100	49
1956–58	Batley
	Total	210	102	8	100	49
- Father: Billy Batten
- Relatives: Ray Batten (nephew)

Frederick "Eric" E. Batten (13 June 1914 – 3 September 1993) was an English rugby union and professional rugby league footballer who played in the 1930s, 1940s and 1950s, and coached rugby league in the 1950s. He played club level rugby league (RU) for Sandal RUFC, and representative level rugby league (RL) for Great Britain and England, and at club level for Wakefield Trinity (two spells, including the second as a World War II guest), Hunslet, Featherstone Rovers (four spells, including the first three as a World War II guest) (captain), Leeds (two spells, including the first as a World War II guest), Castleford (World War II guest) and Bradford Northern, as a wing, and coached at club level for Featherstone Rovers, and Batley. Eric Batten appeared in eight Challenge Cup Finals; two for Leeds, five for Bradford Northern, and one for Featherstone Rovers, winning three, and losing five, he scored a total of 443 tries during his career, he is fifth on the all-time try scorers list.

== Background ==
Eric Batten's birth was registered in Sculcoates district, Kingston upon Hull, East Riding of Yorkshire, England. He was a dustman in the cleansing department for Hemsworth Rural District council. He died aged 79 in Leeds, West Yorkshire, England, and he is buried in Lawnswood Cemetery, Leeds.

== Playing career ==
=== Wakefield Trinity ===
Batten started his rugby career playing rugby union at Sandal RUFC before signing for the rugby league club Wakefield Trinity in September 1933. He made his début for Wakefield Trinity in the 9–3 victory over Bradford Northern at Odsal Stadium, Bradford on Saturday 30 September 1933. He played 41 matches for Wakefield Trinity, scoring 12 tries in those matches, including a hat-trick against Hull Kingston Rovers in March 1936, before he moved to Hunslet in September 1936 for £400.

During the war years, Eric returned to Wakefield Trinity as a World War II guest, playing two matches in May 1940, and one February 1943, in these three wartime matches he scored eight tries, including four against Huddersfield in May 1940, making his club total 20 tries in 44 appearances. He also played one match for Castleford as a World War II guest, he played on the wing against Dewsbury at Crown Flatt, Dewsbury on Saturday 14 February 1942.

Batten played on the wing in Wakefield Trinity's 6–17 defeat by Australia in the 1933–34 Kangaroo tour of Great Britain match during the 1933–34 season at Belle Vue, Wakefield on Saturday 28 October 1933.

=== Hunslet ===
Batten played at centre in Hunslet's 8–2 victory over Leeds in the Championship Final during the 1937–38 at Elland Road, Leeds on Saturday 30 April 1938.

=== Leeds ===
Batten played in Leeds' 19–2 victory over Halifax in the 1940–41 Challenge Cup Final during the 1940–41 season at Odsal Stadium, Bradford, in front of a crowd of 28,500.

Batten played for Leeds during the 1942–43 season following Hunslet's announcement that they would not be competing in the league that season, and played in the 15-16 aggregate defeat by Dewsbury in the 1942–43 Challenge Cup Final; the 9–16 defeat at Crown Flatt, Dewsbury on Sunday 9 May 1943, and the 6–0 victory at Headingley, Leeds on Sunday 16 May 1943.

=== Bradford Northern ===
Batten was transferred to Bradford Northern in October 1943.

Batten played in Bradford Northern's 26-20 aggregate victory over Halifax in the Championship Final during the 1944–45 season; the 2–9 defeat at Thrum Hall, Halifax, and the 24–11 victory at Odsal Stadium, Bradford.

He played in Bradford Northern's 8-3 aggregate victory over Wigan in the 1943–44 Challenge Cup Final during the 1943–44 season; the 0–3 defeat at Central Park, Wigan on Saturday 15 April 1944, and the 8–0 victory at Odsal Stadium, Bradford on Saturday 22 April 1944, played in the 9-13 aggregate defeat by Huddersfield in the 1944–45 Challenge Cup Final during the 1944–45 season; the 4–7 defeat at Fartown, Huddersfield, and the 5–6 defeat at Odsal Stadium, Bradford, played in the 8–4 victory over Leeds in the 1946–47 Challenge Cup Final during the 1946–47 season at Wembley Stadium, London on Saturday 3 May 1947, and played on the wing in the 3–8 defeat by Wigan in the 1947–48 Challenge Cup Final during the 1947–48 season at Wembley Stadium, London on Saturday 1 May 1948, in front of a crowd of 91,465.

Bradford Northern played in five of the six Challenge Cup finals between 1944 and 1949, the first two finals; the 1943–44 Challenge Cup Final against Wigan, and the 1944–45 Challenge Cup Final against Huddersfield were played over two-legs, five Bradford Northern players played in all five of these finals, they were; Eric Batten, Vic Darlison, Donald Ward, Ernest Ward, and Frank Whitcombe.

=== Featherstone Rovers ===
Batten made his début for Featherstone Rovers on Saturday 2 December 1939. He joined the club as a player-coach in June 1951.

Batten played on the wing in Featherstone Rovers' 10–18 defeat by Workington Town in the 1951–52 Challenge Cup Final during the 1951–52 season at Wembley Stadium, London on Saturday 19 April 1952, in front of a crowd of 72,093.

=== Representative honours ===
Batten won caps for England while at Hunslet in 1938 against Wales, in 1939 against France, and Wales, in 1940 against Wales, in 1941 against Wales, in 1943 against Wales, while at Bradford Northern in 1944 against Wales, in 1945 against Wales (2 matches), in 1946 against France (2 matches), and Wales, in 1947 against France, in 1948 against France, and won caps for Great Britain while at Bradford Northern in 1946 against Australia (2 matches), New Zealand, and in 1947 against New Zealand.

Batten played on the wing for a Rugby League XIII against Northern Command XIII at Thrum Hall, Halifax on Saturday 21 March 1942.

== Coaching career ==
Batten was the coach of Batley from October 1956 to April 1958.

== Honoured at Featherstone Rovers ==
Batten is a Featherstone Rovers Hall of Fame inductee.

== Personal life ==
Eric Batten was the son of the rugby league footballer Billy Batten.
