= Ronald Lewis (rugby league) =

English rugby league footballer

Ron Lewis
Personal information
- Full name: Ronald Lewis

Playing information
- Position: Fullback
Club
| Years | Team | Pld | T | G | FG | P |
|---|---|---|---|---|---|---|
| 1944–53 | Castleford | 260 | 7 | 2 | | 25 |
Representative
| Years | Team | Pld | T | G | FG | P |
| 27 Sep 1950 | Yorkshire | 1 | 0 | 0 | 0 | 0 |

Ronald Lewis is a former professional rugby league footballer who played in the 1940s and 1950s. He played at representative level for Yorkshire and at club level for Castleford, as a fullback.

== Playing career ==
=== County honours ===
Ronald Lewis won a cap for Yorkshire while at Castleford, he played playing fullback in the 5-10 defeat by Cumberland at Whitehaven's stadium on 27 September 1950.
