= Willie Davies (rugby) =

GB & Wales dual-code rugby international footballer

Personal information
- Full name: William Thomas Harcourt Davies
- Born: 23 August 1916 Penclawdd, Wales
- Died: 26 September 2002 (aged 86) Rustington, England

Playing information

Rugby union
- Position: Fly-half
Club
Years	Team	Pld	T	G	FG	P
1934–39	Swansea RFC
	Headingley RUFC
	London Welsh RFC
	Total	0	0	0	0	0
Representative
Years	Team	Pld	T	G	FG	P
1936–39	Wales	6				7

Rugby league
- Position: Back
Club
Years	Team	Pld	T	G	FG	P
1939–50	Bradford Northern
Representative
Years	Team	Pld	T	G	FG	P
1939–48	Wales	9				3
1946–47	Great Britain	3

Willie Davies (23 August 1916 – 26 September 2002) was a Welsh international dual-code rugby fly half who played rugby union for Swansea and rugby league for Bradford Northern. He won six caps for the Wales rugby union team and nine caps for the Wales rugby league team. In 2003 he was inducted into the Welsh Sports Hall of Fame. He was the cousin of Wales international Haydn Tanner.

== Rugby career ==
Davies first played rugby for Wales Secondary Schools, alongside his cousin and future Welsh captain, Haydn Tanner. Davies progressed to play club rugby for Swansea and Hedingley, and in 1935 he played for Swansea against the touring New Zealand team. Alongside Tanner, Davies had an outstanding game in which Swansea were victorious over the supposedly 'unbeatable' All Blacks. Tanner and Davies were credited as orchestrating the Swansea success, even though still teenagers and attending Gowerton county school. The New Zealand captain, Jack Manchester, is said to have passed back the message to New Zealand; "Tell them we have been beaten, but don't tell them it was by a pair of schoolboys".

It was at Swansea he was first selected to represent Wales at rugby union. Davies was capped for Wales against Ireland under the captaincy of Joe Rees on 14 March 1936. When Wales won, thanks to a Vivian Jenkins penalty goal, he found himself as part of that year's winning Home Nations Championship team. Davies was back the next season, playing two games in the championship though after the highs of the previous season, Wales lost all their games to end up with the Wooden Spoon. Davies missed the entirety of the 1938 tournament, but was back for the 1939 championship, playing in all three games. In the last match against Ireland Davies scored all seven points with a try and a drop goal for Wales. His drop goal was the last four point drop goal ever scored in the Five Nations Championship, and the last for Wales until the end of World War II. During the war, Davies served as a member of the Royal Air Force.

In 1939 Davies left rugby union behind when he joined professional rugby league team Bradford Northern.

Frank Whitcombe, Willie's Welsh teammate and fellow Lance Todd Trophy winner took on the role of 'minder' for Northern's slightly-built, mercurial stand-off when he was targeted by opposing teams.

He would later play rugby league for the Great Britain and Wales teams. In 1946 he went on tour with Great Britain against Australia and New Zealand. He played in the tour's final Test in New Zealand and at point became a dual-code rugby international. When the Australians toured Britain the next year, Davies was chosen to represent the British team twice.

== International matches played ==
Wales - rugby union

- England 1937, 1939
- Ireland 1936, 1937, 1939
- Scotland 1939

== Challenge Cup Final appearances ==
Willie Davies played, and was man of the match winning the Lance Todd Trophy in Bradford Northern's 8–4 victory over Leeds in the 1946–47 Challenge Cup Final during the 1946-47 season at Wembley Stadium, London on Saturday 3 May 1947, played stand-off in the 3–8 defeat by Wigan in the 1947–48 Challenge Cup Final during the 1947–48 season at Wembley Stadium, London on Saturday 1 May 1948, and played in the 12–0 victory over Halifax in the 1948–49 Challenge Cup Final during the 1948-49 season at Wembley Stadium, London on Saturday 7 May 1949.

== Personal life ==
He qualified as a games and geography teacher at Carnegie College of Physical Education, Leeds and then taught at Bingley Grammar School. He spent most of his teaching career at Weston-super-Mare Boys' Grammar School. He had a son and two daughters.

== Bibliography ==
- Godwin, Terry (1984). The International Rugby Championship 1883-1983. Grafton Street, London: Willow Books. ISBN 0-00-218060-X.
- Smith, David; Williams, Gareth (1980). Fields of Praise: The Official History of The Welsh Rugby Union. Cardiff: University of Wales Press. ISBN 0-7083-0766-3.
