= 1943–44 Challenge Cup =

Rugby league competition

- Duration: 4 rounds
- Number of teams: 16
- Highest attendance: 30,000
- Winners: Bradford Northern
- Runners-up: Wigan

The 1943–44 Challenge Cup was the 43rd staging of rugby league's oldest knockout competition, the Challenge Cup.

The final was contested by Bradford Northern and Wigan, and was played over two legs. The final was won by Bradford Northern 8–3 on aggregate.

== First round ==
Date	Team one	Score one	Team two	Score two
11 Mar	Bradford Northern	15	Wakefield Trinity	2
11 Mar	Dewsbury	43	St Helens	7
11 Mar	Halifax	13	Hunslet	2
11 Mar	Huddersfield	13	Hull FC	0
11 Mar	Keighley	13	Barrow	7
11 Mar	Leeds	12	Featherstone Rovers	9
11 Mar	Oldham	5	Wigan	8
11 Mar	York	11	Batley	10
18 Mar	Barrow	6	Keighley	10
18 Mar	Batley	3	York	0
18 Mar	Featherstone Rovers	2	Leeds	7
18 Mar	Hull FC	5	Huddersfield	0
18 Mar	Hunslet	13	Halifax	12
18 Mar	St Helens	15	Dewsbury	33
18 Mar	Wakefield Trinity	7	Bradford Northern	5
18 Mar	Wigan	25	Oldham	3

== Second round ==
Date	Team one	Score one	Team two	Score two
25 Mar	Halifax	13	Batley	4
25 Mar	Huddersfield	8	Leeds	14
25 Mar	Keighley	9	Bradford Northern	18
25 Mar	Wigan	14	Dewsbury	3
01 Apr	Batley	8	Halifax	8
01 Apr	Bradford Northern	17	Keighley	5
01 Apr	Dewsbury	2	Wigan	11
01 Apr	Leeds	2	Huddersfield	7

== Semifinals ==
Date	Team one	Score one	Team two	Score two
08 Apr	Halifax	5	Bradford Northern	2
08 Apr	Leeds	10	Wigan	5
10 Apr	Bradford Northern	7	Halifax	0
10 Apr	Wigan	11	Leeds	4

== Final ==
=== First leg ===
15 April 1944

Wigan	3 – 0	Bradford Northern
	Report

Central Park, Wigan
Attendance: 22,000

=== Second leg ===
22 April 1944

Bradford Northern	8 – 0	Wigan
	Report

Odsal Stadium, Bradford
Attendance: 30,000

Bradford Northern win 8–3 on aggregate.
