= 1944–45 Challenge Cup =

Rugby league competition

- Duration: 5 rounds
- Winners: Huddersfield
- Runners-up: Bradford Northern

The 1944–45 Challenge Cup was the 44th staging of rugby league's oldest knockout competition, the Challenge Cup.

== Qualifier ==
Date	Team one	Score one	Team two	Score two
03 Mar	Castleford	5	Halifax	8
10 Mar	Halifax	8	Castleford	3

== First round ==
Date	Team one	Score one	Team two	Score two
17 Mar	Batley	7	Wakefield Trinity	10
17 Mar	Featherstone Rovers	4	Oldham	18
17 Mar	Halifax	10	Wigan	11
17 Mar	Hull FC	13	Dewsbury	18
17 Mar	Keighley	11	Hunslet	8
17 Mar	Leeds	5	Huddersfield	21
17 Mar	St Helens	8	Bradford Northern	15
17 Mar	York	12	Barrow	21
24 Mar	Barrow	19	York	5
24 Mar	Bradford Northern	34	St Helens	13
24 Mar	Dewsbury	23	Hull FC	9
24 Mar	Huddersfield	17	Leeds	3
24 Mar	Hunslet	4	Keighley	2
24 Mar	Oldham	8	Featherstone Rovers	7
24 Mar	Wakefield Trinity	24	Batley	12
24 Mar	Wigan	6	Halifax	21

== Second round ==
Date	Team one	Score one	Team two	Score two
31 Mar	Bradford Northern	18	Wakefield Trinity	8
31 Mar	Dewsbury	5	Halifax	11
31 Mar	Huddersfield	13	Barrow	3
31 Mar	Keighley	11	Oldham	0
02 Apr	Barrow	6	Huddersfield	9
02 Apr	Halifax	19	Dewsbury	5
02 Apr	Oldham	8	Keighley	9
02 Apr	Wakefield Trinity	10	Bradford Northern	3

== Semifinals ==
Date	Team one	Score one	Team two	Score two
14 Apr	Halifax	6	Huddersfield	0
14 Apr	Keighley	5	Bradford Northern	0
21 Apr	Bradford Northern	35	Keighley	3
21 Apr	Huddersfield	10	Halifax	3

== Final ==
In the final of the Rugby league Challenge Cup, Huddersfield beat Bradford Northern 13-9 on aggregate over two legs in front of an aggregate crowd of 26,541.

Date	Team one	Score one	Team two	Score two
28 Apr	Huddersfield	7	Bradford Northern	4
05 May	Bradford Northern	5	Huddersfield	6
