= Dai Rees (rugby, born 1897) =

Welsh RL coach and former GB & Wales rugby league footballer

David Rees

Personal information
- Full name: David Rees
- Born: 16 September 1897 Abertillery, Wales
- Died: unknown

Playing information

Rugby union
Club
| Years | Team | Pld | T | G | FG | P |
|---|---|---|---|---|---|---|
| | Abertillery RFC |

Rugby league
- Position: Second-row
Club
| Years | Team | Pld | T | G | FG | P |
|---|---|---|---|---|---|---|
| 1921–32 | Halifax | 279 | 28 | 2 | 0 | 88 |
Representative
| Years | Team | Pld | T | G | FG | P |
| | Glamorgan and Monmouthshire | 1 |
| 1924 | Other Nationalities | 1 |
| 1921–36 | Wales | 6 | 0 | 0 | 0 | 0 |
| 1926 | Great Britain | 1 | 0 | 0 | 0 | 0 |

Coaching information
Club
| Years | Team | Gms | W | D | L | W% |
| 1936–60 | Bradford Northern |

David "Dai" Rees (16 September 1897 – death unknown) was a Welsh rugby union and professional rugby league footballer who played in the 1920s and 1930s, and coached rugby league in the 1930s through to the 1960s. He played club level rugby union (RU) for Abertillery RFC, and representative level rugby league (RL) for Great Britain, Wales, Other Nationalities and Glamorgan and Monmouthshire, and at club level for Halifax, as a second-row, and coached at club level for Bradford Northern.

== Playing career ==
=== International honours ===
Dai Rees won a cap for Other Nationalities (RL) while at Halifax, won 6 caps for Wales (RL) in 1921–32 while at Halifax, and won a cap for Great Britain (RL) while at Halifax in 1926 against New Zealand.

Dai Rees was selected for Great Britain while at Halifax for the 1924 Great Britain Lions tour of Australia and New Zealand, he did not play in any of the Test matches on this tour.

=== County Honours ===
Dai Rees won a cap for Glamorgan and Monmouthshire while at Halifax.

=== Challenge Cup Final appearances ===
Dai Rees played left-second-row in Halifax's 22–8 victory over York in the 1930–31 Challenge Cup Final during the 1930–31 season at Wembley Stadium, London on Saturday 2 May 1931, in front of a crowd of 40,368.

=== Club career ===
Dai Rees made his début for Halifax on 27 August 1921, and he played his last match for Halifax on 16 January 1932.

== Coaching career ==
=== Club career ===
Dai Rees was the coach of Bradford Northern from 1936 to 1960, during these 24-years Bradford Northern won every honour in British rugby league.

== Honoured at Halifax ==
Dai Rees is a Halifax Hall Of Fame Inductee.

== Personal life ==
Rees was married to his wife Novello; her brother, Stanley Winmill was a Welsh rugby union international.
