= Trevor Foster =

Former GB & Wales international rugby league footballer (1914–2005)

Trevor Foster MBE

Personal information
- Full name: Trevor John French Foster
- Born: 3 December 1914 Newport, Monmouthshire, Wales
- Died: 2 April 2005 (aged 90) Bradford, England

Playing information

Rugby union
- Position: Flanker
Club
Years	Team	Pld	T	G	FG	P
1937–38	Newport	35	12

Rugby league
- Position: Second-row, Loose forward
Club
Years	Team	Pld	T	G	FG	P
1938–55	Bradford Northern	428	128	1	0	386
Representative
Years	Team	Pld	T	G	FG	P
1939–51	Wales	16	5	1	0	17
1946–48	Great Britain	3	2	0	0	6
1942–44	Northern Command	3	2	0	0	6
1943	Army XIII	1	0	0	0	0

Coaching information
Club
Years	Team	Gms	W	D	L	W%
1960–61	Bradford Northern

Trevor John French Foster (3 December 1914 – 2 April 2005) was a Welsh rugby footballer and coach. He played rugby union for Newport and rugby league for Bradford Northern. Foster was a Sergeant Physical Training Instructor in the British Army during World War II.

== Early years ==
Trevor Foster was born on December 3rd, 1914, in Newport, Monmouthshire. He joined the Bradford Northern rugby league club in 1938 for £400 from Newport RFC, his home town's rugby union club. Foster played for Newport Schoolboys and Pill Harriers as a teenager, before joining Newport. He was also chosen to play for invitational team Crawshays.

== Bradford Northern career ==
Foster played 432 games in total for Bradford Northern, usually as a second-row and occasionally as a loose forward. During this time, he scored 130 tries, including 22 in the 1947–48 season and six tries in one game. Foster was a regular forward for Bradford Northern side in the post-war period, contributing to the Rugby League Challenge Cup in 1947 and 1949 and scoring in both games. Foster played at second-row in Bradford Northern's 3–8 defeat by Wigan in the 1947–48 Challenge Cup Final during the 1947–48 season at Wembley Stadium, London on Saturday 1 May 1948. Foster played at second-row in Bradford Northern's 6–13 defeat by Wigan in the Championship Final during the 1951–52 season at Leeds Road, Huddersfield on Saturday 10 May 1952.

== Representative honours ==
Foster won 16 caps for Wales while at Bradford Northern between the years of 1939 and 1951, including seven as captain, and won caps for Great Britain in 1946 against New Zealand and in 1948 against Australia. He was selected for the 1946 Great Britain Lions tour of Australia but was injured before being able to play a game.

Foster played at second-row and was captain for Northern Command XIII against a Rugby League XIII at Thrum Hall, Halifax on Saturday 21 March 1942. He was never sent off during his 17 years of topflight rugby.

== Retirement and coaching ==
After his retirement in 1955, Foster remained at Bradford as Coach, Director, and Chairman of the Supporters Club, as well as timekeeper for Super League home games.

== Assisting Bradford Northern ==
In 1963, Foster was involved in a campaign to save Bradford Northern club, which had disbanded due to financial problems. He led efforts to reconstitute the club, and it was then able to rejoin the league the following season.

== Honours ==
In the 2001 New Year Honours, Foster was appointed a Member of the Order of the British Empire (MBE) "for services to the community in Bradford, West Yorkshire." In 2004, he was inducted into Welsh Sports Hall of Fame.

Foster has been included in Bradford's 'Millennium Masters' and 'Bull Masters'; in August 2007 he was named in the 'Team of the Century'. Only six players have been included in all three lists; Karl Fairbank, Trevor Foster, James Lowes, Keith Mumby, Robbie Paul and Ernest Ward. He was also included in the Arriva Yorkshire Rugby League Dream Team on 20 August 2009. The ceremony took place at The Jungle, the home of the Castleford Tigers.

== Death ==
Foster died due to a heart attack on April 2, 2005 in Bradford Royal Infirmary at the age of 90.
