= 1950 Great Britain Lions tour =

- Manager: George Oldroyd
- Coach(es): Tom Spedding
- Tour captain(s): Ernest Ward
- Top point scorer(s): Ernest Ward (128)
- Top try scorer(s): Tom Danby (34)
- Top test point scorer(s): Ernest Ward (13)
- Top test try scorer(s): Jack Hilton (2)
Summary
P	W	D	L
Total
25	19	0	6
Test match
5	1	0	4
Opponent
P	W	D	L
Australia
3	1	0	2
New Zealand
2	0	0	2

Tour chronology
- Previous tour: 1946
- Next tour: 1954

The 1950 Great Britain Lions tour was a tour by the Great Britain national rugby league team of Australia and New Zealand which took place between May and August 1950. The tour involved a schedule of 25 games: 19 in Australia including a three-test series against Australia for the Ashes, and a further 6 in New Zealand including two test matches against New Zealand. A scheduled fixture in Forbes, New South Wales, against a Western Districts team, was abandoned when the chartered plane could not land due to bad weather. Captained by Ernest Ward, the Lions returned home having won 19 and lost 6 of their games. The team won the first test match of the tour but lost the second and third to lose the Ashes Test series to Australia. The team also lost both Test Matches in and against New Zealand. Despite being a British team – five of the squad were Welsh – the team played, and were often referred to by both the press at home and away, as England.

== Squad ==
The touring party departed for Australia on 20 April aboard the SS Himalaya. Tom Spedding was the Team Manager, and George Oldroyd was the Business Manager, of the touring party.

Player	Pos.	Age (Note: Age as given in the Rugby League News for the first match against New South Wales)	Weight	Club	Tests on Tour	Games in Aus	Games in NZ (Note: Other than the Test Matches, team lists for the tour matches in New Zealand not available to the author at the time of page creation.)	Tries	Goals	FG	Points
Ernie Ashcroft	Centre	25	12 st. 7 lb. (79 kg)	Wigan	4	10		4	0	0	12
Tommy Bradshaw	Halfback	29	10 st. 5 lb. (66 kg)	Wigan	4	10		1	0	0	3
Jack Cunliffe	Centre	29	11 st. 12 lb. (75 kg)	Wigan	2	12		14	9	0	60
Tom Danby	Centre	23	13 st. 6 lb. (85 kg)	Salford	3	13		34	0	0	102
Arthur Daniels	Wing	27	12 st. 10 lb. (81 kg)	Halifax	0	4		5	0	0	15
Joe Egan	Hooker	31	14 st. 0 lb. (89 kg)	Wigan	5	11		3	0	0	9
Jim Featherstone	Prop	27	14 st. 4 lb. (91 kg)	Warrington	2	9		10	0	0	30
Ken Gee	Prop	33	15 st. 10 lb. (100 kg)	Wigan	5	10		1	9	0	21
Elwyn Gwyther	Prop	29	14 st. 7 lb. (92 kg)	Belle Vue Rangers	3	12		2	0	0	6
Fred Higgins	Second-row	29	14 st. 4 lb. (91 kg)	Widnes	5	11		4	0	0	12
Jack Hilton	Wing	29	12 st. 4 lb. (78 kg)	Wigan	4	8		21	0	0	63
Willie Horne	Five-eighth	26	11 st. 10 lb. (74 kg)	Barrow	0	5		2	13	0	32
Jimmy Ledgard	Fullback	27	11 st. 6 lb. (73 kg)	Leigh	3	11		2	37	0	80
Harry Murphy	Second-row	29	14 st. 6 lb. (92 kg)	Wakefield Trinity	1	10		2	0	0	6
Danny Naughton	Prop	25	15 st. 7 lb. (98 kg)	Widnes	0	8		2	0	0	6
Frank Osmond	Hooker	30	13 st. 7 lb. (86 kg)	Swinton	0	8		4	0	0	12
Albert Pepperell	Halfback	28	11 st. 6 lb. (73 kg)	Workington	1	9		7	0	0	21
Doug Phillips	Second-row	30	14 st. 12 lb. (94 kg)	Belle Vue Rangers	1	8		7	0	0	21
Roy Pollard	Wing	22	11 st. 10 lb. (74 kg)	Dewsbury	1	5		5	6	0	27
Gordon Ratcliffe	Wing	24	13 st. 0 lb. (83 kg)	Wigan	2	10		6	0	0	18
Bob Ryan	Second-row	26	13 st. 5 lb. (85 kg)	Warrington	3	10		5	0	0	15
Martin Ryan	Fullback	26	12 st. 10 lb. (81 kg)	Wigan	1	10		4	1	0	14
Harry Street	Lock	22	13 st. 0 lb. (83 kg)	Dewsbury	4	12		3	0	0	9
Ken Traill	Lock	23	13 st. 12 lb. (88 kg)	Bradford Northern	2	10		7	0	0	21
Ernest Ward	Centre	29	13 st. 0 lb. (83 kg)	Bradford Northern	5	12		8	52	0	128
Dickie Williams	Five-eighth	25	10 st. 5 lb. (66 kg)	Leeds	4	9		7	0	0	21

== Australian leg ==
May 14	Western Australia	4–87	Great Britain	Claremont Showground, Perth
	Tries: nil Goals: 2 L. Graham (2)	[Team; Report; Photos Report]	Tries: 21; Jack Hilton (7); Arthur Daniels (3); Tom Danby (3); Ernest Ward (3); Frank Osmond (2); Jim Featherstone (2); Doug Phillips; Goals: 12; Ernest Ward (12)	Attendance: 7,000; Gate: AU£ Free; Referee: F. Baguley

Team list:

Western Australia: FB: Joe McGuiness ( Fremantle), WG: Tom Myles ( Cottesloe), CE: Terry Sullivan ( Fremantle), CE: George Jannings ( Applecross), WG: T. Boyd ( Fremantle), FE: L. McGann (Perth), HB: S. Saxon ( South Perth), LK: Les Graham ( Cottesloe), SR: R. Patching ( South Perth), SR: G. Voules ( South Perth), PR: R. Slater ( South Perth), HK: P. Neary (Perth), PR: D. Tonkin ( Fremantle), CH: N. Stohlberg.

Great Britain: FB: Martin Ryan, WG: Jack Hilton, CE: Ernest Ward, CE: Tom Danby, WG: Arthur Daniels, FE: Dickie Williams, HB: Tommy Bradshaw, LK: Harry Murphy, SR: Fred Higgins, SR: Doug Phillips, PR: Ken Gee, HK: Frank Osmond, PR: Jim Featherstone.

May 24	Monaro	10–37	Great Britain	Manuka Oval, Canberra
3.10pm	Tries: 2 William McKell; D. Stewart; Goals: 2 A. James (2)	[Teams; Report Report]	Tries: 9 Roy Pollard (2); Bob Ryan (2); Gordon Ratcliffe; Ken Traill; Ernie Ashcroft; Joe Egan; Fred Higgins; Goals: 5 Jimmy Ledgard (5)	Attendance: 4,600; Gate: AU£ 573; Referee: H. Nicholls

Team list:

Monaro: FB: A. James ( Canberra), WG: D. Stewart ( Bombala), CE: Tom Briggs ( Goulburn), CE: J. Gibson ( North Canberra), WG: P. Conroy | Queanbeyan), FE: Jack McIntosh ( Tathra), HB: Neville Hogan ( North Canberra), LK: William McKell ( Goulburn), SR: B. Davis ( Batemans Bay), SR: Don Penning ( Goulburn), PR: A. Norgrove ( Canberra), HK: Ted Dawson (Bigga), PR: Glen Spence ( Goulburn).

Great Britain: FB: Jimmy Ledgard, WG: Roy Pollard, CE: Ernie Ashcroft, CE: Jack Cunliffe, WG: Gordon Ratcliffe, FE: Willie Horne, HB: Albert Pepperell, LK: Ken Traill, SR: Fred Higgins, SR: Bob Ryan, PR: Danny Naughton, HK: Joe Egan, PR: Elwyn Gwyther.

May 27	Newcastle	10–21	Great Britain	Newcastle Sports Ground, Newcastle
2.40pm	Tries: 2 Jack Hutchinson; Ramsay Buckley; Goals: 2 George Neader (2)	[Teams; Report Report]	Tries: 5 Jack Hilton (3); Ernie Ashcroft; Joe Egan; Goals: 3 Ernest Ward (3)	Attendance: 22,274; Gate: AU£ 3,271; Referee: H. Gillard

Team list:

Newcastle: FB: George Neader (22) ( Waratah Mayfield), WG: William Bunt (24) ( Central Newcastle), CE: Viv Madge (27) ( Kurri Kurri), CE: William Bower (24) ( South Newcastle), WG: Jack Lumsden (20) ( Cessnock), FE: Horrie Banks (27) ( Western Suburbs), HB: Jim Scoular (27) ( Lakes United), LK: Jack Hutchinson (27) ( Northern Suburbs), SR: Bob Alexander (26) ( Cessnock), SR: Jim Evans (21) ( Maitland), PR: Gavin Stevenson (25) ( Cessnock), HK: Bob Crane (27) ( Northern Suburbs), PR: Ramsay Buckley (26) ( Lakes United), CH: Reg Cody.

Great Britain: FB: Jimmy Ledgard, WG: Arthur Daniels, CE: Ernest Ward, CE: Ernie Ashcroft, WG: Jack Hilton, FE: Dickie Williams, HB: Tommy Bradshaw, LK: Harry Street, SR: Harry Murphy, SR: Bob Ryan, PR: Elwyn Gwyther, HK: Joe Egan, PR: Ken Gee.

May 31	Riverina	13–23	Great Britain	Fisher Park, Cootamundra
3pm	Tries: 1 Stan Larkings; Goals: 5 Keith Tull (3); Lew Evans (2)	[Team; Report Report]	Tries: 5 Gordon Ratcliffe; Doug Phillips; Jack Cunliffe; Albert Pepperell; Tom Danby; Goals: 4 Willie Horne (4)	Attendance: 6,943; Gate: AU£ 1,065; Referee: M. Ibbotson

Team list:

Riverina: FB: Peter McGrath ( West Wyalong), WG: Stan Larkings ( Junee), CE: Kevin Wallace (age 24) (Boorowa), CE: Keith Tull ( Cootamundra), WG: John Biscaya (Wagga), FE: Roley McDonnel ( Cootamundra), HB: Col Donohue ( Barmedman), LK: Lew Evans ( Temora), SR: Sid Hobson ( Young), SR: Paddy Maloney ( Young), PR: Jim Thomson ( Cowra), HK: Ken McDonald ( Barmedman), PR: Nevyl Hand ( Gundagai), CH: Len Smith.

Great Britain: FB: Martin Ryan, WG: Gordon Ratcliffe, CE: Tom Danby, CE: Jack Cunliffe, WG: Roy Pollard, FE: Willie Horne, HB: Albert Pepperell, LK: Ken Traill, SR: Fred Higgins, SR: Doug Phillips, PR: Danny Naughton, HK: Frank Osmond, PR: Elwyn Gwyther.

June 3	New South Wales	13–20	Great Britain	Sydney Cricket Ground, Sydney
2.30pm	Tries: 1 Jack Troy; Goals: 5 Noel Pidding (5)	[Program; Report; Report Report]	Tries: 4 Jack Hilton (2); Ernest Ward; Ernie Ashcroft; Goals: 4 Ernest Ward (4)	Attendance: 70,419; Gate: AU£ 8,881; Referee: George Bishop

Team list:

New South Wales: FB: Clive Churchill (age 23) ( South Sydney), WG: Noel Pidding (23) ( St George), CE: Johnny Hawke (24) ( St George), CE: Doug McRitchie (27) ( St George), WG: Jack Troy (22) ( Newtown), FE: Frank Stanmore (20) ( Western Suburbs), HB: Perce Pritchard (23) ( Manly-Warringah), LK: Les Cowie (25) ( South Sydney), SR: Fred De Belin (28) ( Balmain), SR: Jack Rayner (28) ( South Sydney), PR: Jack Holland (26) ( St George), HK: Kevin Schubert (22) ( Manly-Warringah), PR: Roy Bull (20) ( Manly-Warringah), CH: Vic Hey.

Great Britain: FB: Martin Ryan, WG: Roy Pollard, CE: Ernest Ward, CE: Ernie Ashcroft, WG: Jack Hilton, FE: Dickie Williams, HB: Tommy Bradshaw, LK: Harry Street, SR: Fred Higgins, SR: Bob Ryan, PR: Ken Gee, HK: Joe Egan, 1950: PR: Elwyn Gwyther.

=== 1st Test ===
June 12
2pm

Australia	4–6	Great Britain
Tries: nil Goals: 2 Noel Pidding (2)	Program; Database; Report	Tries: 2 Jack Hilton (2); Goals: nil

Sydney Cricket Ground, Sydney
Attendance: 47,275
Gate: AU£ 6,769
Referee: George Bishop

Team list:

Australia: FB: Clive Churchill (age 23) ( South Sydney), WG: Noel Pidding (23) ( St George), CE: Doug McRitchie (27) ( St George), CE: Keith Middleton (19) ( North Sydney), WG: Jack Troy (22) ( Newtown), FE: Frank Stanmore (20) ( Western Suburbs), HB: Keith Holman (22) ( Western Suburbs), LK: Les Cowie (25) ( South Sydney), SR: Fred De Belin (28) ( Balmain), SR: Alan Thompson (27) ( Souths), PR: Jack Holland (26) ( St George), HK: Kevin Schubert (22) ( Manly-Warringah), PR: Duncan Hall (24) (Home Hill).

Great Britain: FB: Martin Ryan, WG: Gordon Ratcliffe, CE: Ernest Ward, CE: Ernie Ashcroft, WG: Jack Hilton, FE: Dickie Williams, HB: Tommy Bradshaw, LK: Harry Street, SR: Bob Ryan, SR: Fred Higgins, PR: Ken Gee, HK: Joe Egan, PR: Elwyn Gwyther.

June 14	North Coast	7–37	Great Britain	Kempsey Park, Kempsey
3pm	Tries: 1 Ken Gray; Goals: 2 Kevin Ryan (2)	[Teams; Report; Photos Report]	Tries: 7 Albert Pepperell (2); Tom Danby (2); Doug Phillips; Jim Featherstone; Danny Naughton; Goals: 8 Jimmy Ledgard (8)	Attendance: 7,542; Gate: AU£ 973; Referee: Joe Haggarty

Team list:

North Coast: FB: Dudley Jones (Murwillumbah), WG: Johnny Meyers (Lismore), CE: Barry Redding (Camden Haven), CE: Alf Roach ( Kyogle), WG: Wally Williams (Coffs Harbour), FE: Jim Ruge (Kempsey CYM), HB: Stan Ponchard (Kempsey CYM), LK: Kevin Ryan ( Wauchope), SR: Ken Gray (24) ( Grafton), SR: Gordon McCarthy (Taree), PR: Keith Dinsey ( Cudgen), HK: Kevin McKeirnan (18) (Kempsey CYM), PR: Jack Monaghan ( Beechwood). CH: Reg Cody.

Great Britain: FB: Jimmy Ledgard, WG: Gordon Ratcliffe, CE: Tom Danby, CE: Jack Cunliffe, WG: Arthur Daniels, FE: Willie Horne, HB: Albert Pepperell, LK: Ken Traill, SR: Doug Phillips, SR: Harry Murphy, PR: Jim Featherstone, HK: Frank Osmond, PR: Danny Naughton

June 17	Queensland	15–14	Great Britain	Brisbane Cricket Ground, Brisbane
2.30pm	Tries: 1 Ned Andrews; Goals: 6 Nev Linde (6)	[Teams; Report; Report Report]	Tries: 2 Jack Hilton; Jim Featherstone; Goals: 4 Ernest Ward (4)	Attendance: 22,118; Gate: AU£ 3,274; Referee: John Hoffman

Team list:

Queensland: FB: Nev Linde (Tivoli), WG: Denis Flannery (22) (Ipswich CYM), CE: Colin Quinn (22) (Ipswich CYM), CE: Noel Hazzard (Bundaberg), WG: Pat McMahon (22) (Babinda Trojans), FE: Ned Andrews (28) (Mackay - played for each club in turn), HB: Billy Thompson (26) (Warwick), LK: Harold Crocker (22) ( Souths), SR: Alan Thompson (27) ( Souths), SR: Brian Davies (20) ( Brothers), PR: Duncan Hall (24) (Home Hill), HK: Ron Griffiths (Ipswich CYM), PR: Jack Rooney ( Brothers), CH: Fred Gilbert.

Great Britain: FB: Martin Ryan, WG: Gordon Ratcliffe, CE: Ernest Ward, CE: Ernie Ashcroft, WG: Jack Hilton, FE: Willie Horne, HB: Tommy Bradshaw, LK: Harry Street, SR: Fred Higgins, SR: Bob Ryan, PR: Ken Gee, HK: Joe Egan, PR: Jim Featherstone.

June 21	North Queensland	18–39	Great Britain	Townsville Sports Reserve, Townsville
3pm	Tries: 4 Jack Munn (2); Duncan Hall; Jack Horrigan; Goals: 3 Ned Andrews (2); Jack Horrigan	[Team; Report Report]	Tries: 9 Gordon Ratcliffe (3); Tom Danby (2); Ken Traill; Danny Naughton; Elwyn Gwyther; Dickie Williams; Goals: 6 Ernest Ward (6)	Attendance: 9,500; Gate: AU£ 1,688; Referee: R. Allison

Team list:

North Queensland: FB: Jack Gayler (Babinda Trojans), WG: Pat McMahon (Babinda Trojans), CE: Jack Horrigan (Ayr), CE: Gordon Farrelly (21) (Home Hill), WG: Bert Sager (25) (Souths), FE: Ned Andrews (27) (Mackay - played for each club in turn), HB: Ron O'Connell (Hughenden), LK: Lionel Armitt (25) ( Brothers), SR: Duncan Hall (22) (Home Hill), SR: Les Renouf (Sarina), PR: Jack Munn (26) (Herbert River), HK: Henry Benton (Centrals), PR: Charlie Montgomery (Carltons).

Great Britain: FB: Jimmy Ledgard, WG: Tom Danby, CE: Ernest Ward, CE: Jack Cunliffe, WG: Gordon Ratcliffe, FE: Dickie Williams, HB: Albert Pepperell, LK: Ken Traill, SR: Doug Phillips, SR: Harry Murphy, PR: Elwyn Gwyther, HK: Frank Osmond, PR: Danny Naughton.

June 25	Central Queensland	0–88	Great Britain	Rockhampton Showgrounds, Rockhampton
3.15pm	Tries: nil Goals: nil	[Team; Report Report]	Tries: 20; Tom Danby (5); Jack Cunliffe (4); Willie Horne (2); Martin Ryan (2); Fred Higgins (2); Ernest Ward (2); Ken Gee; Ken Traill; Tommy Bradshaw; Goals: 14; Willie Horne (9); Ernest Ward (5)	Attendance: 7,000; Gate: AU£ 1,247; Referee: Jack Shuttleton

Team list:

Central Queensland: FB: Alan Poole ( Brothers), WG: Leo Jeffcoat ( Brothers), CE: K. Roberts ( Brothers), CE: William Cuddy ( Brothers), WG: D. McDonald ( Fitzroys), FE: Dooley Turner ( Brothers), HB: Brad Neven ( Fitzroys), PR: C. Harkin ( Brothers), HK: Graham Lee ( Fitzroys), PR: Stan Petersen ( Fitzroys), SR: Tony Brown ( Brothers), SR: Roy Harris ( Brothers), LK: W. Hick (Blackall).

Great Britain: FB: Martin Ryan, WG: Tom Danby, CE: Ernest Ward, CE: Jack Cunliffe, WG: Gordon Ratcliffe, FE: Willie Horne, HB: Tommy Bradshaw, LK: Ken Traill, SR: Doug Phillips, SR: Fred Higgins, PR: Jim Featherstone, HK: Joe Egan, PR: Ken Gee.

June 28	Wide Bay Burnett	9–84	Great Britain	Albert Park, Gympie
3pm	Tries: 1 K. Wise; Goals: 3 Kev White (3)	[Team; Report Report]	Tries: 18; Tom Danby (6); Ken Traill (3); Jack Cunliffe (2); Jimmy Ledgard; Gordon Ratcliffe; Dickie Williams; Jim Featherstone; Albert Pepperell; Bob Ryan; Frank Osmond Goals: 15; Jimmy Ledgard (15)	Attendance: 4,633; Gate: AU£ 974; Referee: F. Cartwright

Team list:

Wide Bay Burnett: FB: Kev White (Maryborough), WG: Des Dahl (Bundaberg), CE: Rex McGlynn (Bundaberg), CE: Noel Hazzard (Bundaberg), WG: Ken Gayton (Bundaberg), FE: Ken Kennedy (Wallaroos), HB: Stan Daunt (Gympie), LK: Doug Cozens (Maryborough), SR: Col Wilson (Kingaroy), SR: K. Wise (Bundaberg), FR: Sid Murray (Gympie), HK: Les Sommerville (Bundaberg), FR: Keith Kendrick (Maryborough).

Great Britain: FB: Jimmy Ledgard, WG: Gordon Ratcliffe, CE: Jack Cunliffe, CE: Harry Street, WG: Tom Danby, FE: Dickie Williams, HB: Albert Pepperell, LK: Ken Traill, SR: Bob Ryan, SR: Harry Murphy, PR: Danny Naughton, HK: Frank Osmond, PR: Jim Featherstone.

=== 2nd Test ===
July 1
2.30pm

Australia	15–3	Great Britain
Tries: 3 Johnny Graves; Les Cowie; Keith Holman; Goals: 3 Johnny Graves; Jack Holland; Clive Churchill	Database; Teams; Report	Tries: 1 Tom Danby; Goals: nil

Brisbane Cricket Ground, Brisbane
Attendance: 35,000
Gate: AU£ 7,377
Referee: Frank Ballard

Team list:

Australia: FB: Clive Churchill (23) ( South Sydney), WG: Denis Flannery (21) (Ipswich CYM), CE: Ned Andrews (27) (Mackay), CE: Keith Middleton (18) ( North Sydney), WG: Johnny Graves (23) ( South Sydney), FE: Frank Stanmore (20) ( Western Suburbs), HB: Keith Holman (22) ( Western Suburbs), LK: Les Cowie (25) ( South Sydney), SR: Fred De Belin (28) ( Balmain), SR: Harold Crocker (22) ( Souths), FR: Jack Holland (26) ( St George), HK: Kevin Schubert (22) ( Manly-Warringah), FR: Alan Thompson (26) ( Souths).

Great Britain: FB: Jimmy Ledgard, WG: Gordon Ratcliffe, CE: Ernest Ward, CE: Ernie Ashcroft, WG: Tom Danby, FE: Dickie Williams, HB: Tommy Bradshaw, LK: Harry Street, SR: Fred Higgins, SR: Harry Murphy, PR: Ken Gee, HK: Joe Egan, PR: Elwyn Gwyther.

July 4	Toowoomba	12–44	Great Britain	Athletic Oval, Toowoomba
3pm	Tries: 2 Des McGovern; Allen Bell; Goals: 3 Bevan Hoyle (3)	[Team; Report Report]	Tries: 10; Tom Danby (4); Jack Cunliffe (2); Ernie Ashcroft; Ken Traill; Joe Egan; Jim Featherstone; Goals: 7 Jack Cunliffe (7)	Attendance: 7,000; Gate: AU£ 1,423; Referee: H. Reithmuller

Team list:

Toowoomba: FB: William Sullivan ( All Whites), WG: Des McGovern (22) ( All Whites), CE: Bill Callinan ( Newtown), CE: Roy Teys ( Valleys), WG: Bevan Hoyle ( Newtown), FE: L. Winkle (Warwick), LK: William Curtis ( ), SR: Allen Bell (Warwick), SR: M. Smith ( ), FR: M. Krog ( Newtown), HK: Kev Boshammer ( ), FR: Gordon Teys ( Valleys), CH: Duncan Thompson (55).

Great Britain: FB: Martin Ryan, WG: Tom Danby, CE: Jack Cunliffe, CE: Ernie Ashcroft, WG: Harry Street, FE: Dickie Williams, HB: Albert Pepperell, LK: Ken Traill, SR: Jim Featherstone, SR: Bob Ryan, PR: Danny Naughton, HK: Joe Egan, PR: Elwyn Gwyther.

July 6	Brisbane	8–18	Great Britain	Brisbane Cricket Ground, Brisbane
3pm	Tries: nil Goals: 4 Norm Pope (4)	[Team; Preview; Reports Report]	Tries: 2 Jack Cunliffe; Ernest Ward; Goals: 6 Ernest Ward (6)	Attendance: 15,084; Gate: AU£ 2,091; Referee: S.W. Chambers

Team list:

Brisbane: FB: Norm Pope (18) ( Valleys), WG: Jack McMahon ( Brothers), CE: Vivian Irwin ( Wests), CE: Peter Ryan ( Valleys), WG: D. Smith, FE: Ray White ( Souths), HB: Ron Stanton ( Easts), LK: Alan Crocker ( Souths), SR: Brian Davies ( Brothers), SR: Jack Veivers ( Souths), FR: Jack Rooney ( Brothers), HK: Ray Graham ( Valleys), FR: George Walker ( Norths).

Great Britain: FB: Jimmy Ledgard, WG: Gordon Ratcliffe, CE: Ernest Ward, CE: Ernie Ashcroft, WG: Tom Danby, FE: Jack Cunliffe, HB: Albert Pepperell, LK: Ken Traill, SR: Harry Murphy, SR: Bob Ryan, PR: Jim Featherstone, HK: Frank Osmond, PR: Danny Naughton.

July 8	Ipswich	13–18	Great Britain	North Ipswich Reserve, Ipswich
3.15pm	Tries: 1 Harry Griffiths; Goals: 5 Nev Linde (5)	[Preview; Report Report]	Tries: 4 Harry Street; Jack Cunliffe; Jimmy Ledgard; Bob Ryan; Goals: 3 Ernest Ward (3)	Attendance: 4,946; Gate: AU£ 820; Referee: John Hoffman

Team list:

Ipswich: FB: Nev Linde (Tivoli), WG: Denis Flannery (Ipswich CYM), CE: Eric Porter (Tivoli), CE: Colin Quinn (Ipswich CYM), WG: Bill Biggam ( Booval Swifts), FE: Harry Griffiths ( Booval Swifts), HB: Lex Stephens ( West End), LK: Sel Fleming ( West End), SR: Sam Krueger (Ipswich CYM), SR: Frank Evans ( Booval Swifts), PR: Tom Purnell (Tivoli), HK: Ron Griffiths (Ipswich CYM), PR: Stuart Pankoff (Tivoli), CH: Les Heidke.

Great Britain: FB: Jimmy Ledgard, WG: Harry Street, CE: Ernest Ward, CE: Martin Ryan, WG: Jack Hilton, FE: Jack Cunliffe, HB: Tommy Bradshaw, LK: Harry Murphy, SR: Bob Ryan, SR: Fred Higgins, PR: Elwyn Gwyther, HK: Joe Egan, PR: Danny Naughton.

July 12	Northern Division	4–41	Great Britain	Kitchener Park, Gunnedah
2.45pm	Tries: nil Goals: 2 Eric Fraser (2)	[Team; Report Report]	Tries: 9 Jack Hilton (3); Albert Pepperell (2); Tom Danby; Martin Ryan; Jim Featherstone; Frank Osmond; Goals: 7 Jimmy Ledgard (7)	Attendance: 5,313; Gate: AU£ 1,009; Referee: M. Whitby

Team list:

Northern Division: FB: J. Whitton ( Gunnedah), WG: E. O'Brien ( Werris Creek), CE: Bruce Flint (West Armidale), CE: Norman Young (Tamworth), WG: Keith Oehlers (Guyra), FE: Greg Wilkins ( Werris Creek), HB: Eric Fraser ( Werris Creek), LK: C. Urquhart ( Boggabri), SR: E. Benson (Tamworth), SR: L. Grieves ( Werris Creek), PR: Percy Barton ( Narrabri), HK: R. Whitton ( Quirindi), PR: Nev Harrison ( Scone).

Great Britain: FB: Jimmy Ledgard, WG: Tom Danby, CE: Ernie Ashcroft, CE: Martin Ryan, WG: Jack Hilton, FE: Jack Cunliffe, HB: Albert Pepperell, LK: Harry Street, SR: Harry Murphy, SR: Doug Phillips, PR: Jim Featherstone, HK: Frank Osmond, PR: Ken Gee.

July 15	New South Wales	0–10	Great Britain	Sydney Cricket Ground, Sydney
2.30pm	Tries: nil Goals: nil	[Program; Report; Report Report]	Tries: 2 Fred Higgins; Elwyn Gwyther; Goals: 2 Jimmy Ledgard (2)	Attendance: 24,788; Gate: AU£ 2,747; Referee: T. McMahon Jr.

Team list:

New South Wales: FB: Clive Churchill (23) ( South Sydney), WG: Noel Pidding (23) ( St George), CE: Bobby Dimond (20) ( Western Suburbs), CE: Keith Middleton (19) ( North Sydney), WG: Jack Troy (22) ( Newtown), FE: Col Geelan (21) ( Newtown), HB: Keith Holman (23) ( Western Suburbs), LK: Les Cowie (25) ( South Sydney), SR: Fred De Belin (28) ( Balmain), SR: Noel Mulligan (24) ( St George), PR: Denis Donoghue (22) ( South Sydney), HK: Kevin Schubert (22) ( Manly-Warringah), PR: Jack Holland (26) ( St George).

Great Britain: FB: Jimmy Ledgard, WG: Harry Street, CE: Roy Pollard, CE: Ernest Ward, WG: Tom Danby, FB: Jack Cunliffe, HB: Albert Pepperell, LK: Ken Traill, SR: Doug Phillips, SR: Fred Higgins, PR: Elwyn Gwyther, HK: Joe Egan, PR: Ken Gee.

July 19	Southern Division	18–11	Great Britain	Wollongong Showground, Wollongong
3.30pm	Tries: 2 Jack McLean (2); Goals: 6 Jack O'Connell (6)	[Locals; Locals; Report Report]	Tries: 3 Arthur Daniels (2); Tom Danby; Goals: 1 Martin Ryan	Attendance: 8,647; Gate: AU£ 969; Referee: Jack Underwood

Team list:

Southern Division: FB: Jack O'Connell (Age: 19) ( Corrimal), WG: Jack McLean (22) ( Bowral), CE: Len Torpy (22) ( Wests), CE: Jack Seymour (23) ( Bowral), WG: Ray Morgan (23) ( Thirroul), FE: Noel Sharpe (21) ( Port Kembla), HB: Ken Brogan (23) ( Camden), LK: Billy Wilson (23) ( Picton), SR: Bill Burgess (27) ( Wollongong), SR: Bruce Smith (23) ( Thirroul), PR: Laurie Doran (31) ( Campbelltown), HK: Leo Hurley (20) ( Port Kembla), PR: Jim Ralston (23) ( Port Kembla), CH: Harry Nolan.

Great Britain: FB: Martin Ryan, WG: Arthur Daniels, CE: Tom Danby, CE: Harry Street, WG: Roy Pollard, FE: Dickie Williams, HB: Tommy Bradshaw, LK: Ken Traill, SR: Bob Ryan, SR: Harry Murphy, PR: Jim Featherstone, HK: Frank Osmond, PR: Elwyn Gwyther.

=== 3rd Test ===
July 22

Australia	5–2	Great Britain
Tries: 1 Ron Roberts; Goals: 1 Clive Churchill	Program; Database; Report	Tries: nil Goals: 1 Ernest Ward

Sydney Cricket Ground, Sydney
Attendance: 47,178
Gate: AU£ 6,117
Referee: T. McMahon Jr.

Team list:

Australia: FB: Clive Churchill (23) ( South Sydney), WG: Ron Roberts (22) ( St George), CE: Keith Middleton (19) ( North Sydney), CE: Doug McRitchie (27) ( St George), WG: Jack Troy (22) ( Newtown), FE: Frank Stanmore (20) ( Western Suburbs), HB: Keith Holman (23) ( Western Suburbs), LK: Les Cowie (25) ( South Sydney), SR: Bernie Purcell (22) ( South Sydney), SR: Harold Crocker (23) ( Souths), FR: Jack Holland (26) ( St George), HK: Kevin Schubert (22) ( Manly-Warringah), FR: Duncan Hall (24) (Home Hill).

Great Britain: FB: Jimmy Ledgard, WG: Tom Danby, CE: Ernest Ward, CE: Ernie Ashcroft, WG: Jack Hilton, FE: Jack Cunliffe, HB: Tommy Bradshaw, LK: Harry Street, SR: Fred Higgins, SR: Doug Phillips, PR: Elwyn Gwyther, HK: Joe Egan, PR: Ken Gee.

With Ron Roberts late try in the Brewongle Stand corner, Australia won The Ashes for the first time since 1920. Due to constant heavy rains in Sydney in early-mid 1950 and with the amount of use it was put through, the SCG was reduced to a bog for the game.

== New Zealand leg ==
July 26	Southern Provinces	15–40	Great Britain	Basin Reserve, Wellington
	Tries: 3 Goals: 3	[Result Report]	Tries: 10; Roy Pollard (2); Doug Phillips (3); Jack Cunliffe (2); Martin Ryan; Jim Featherstone; Tom Danby; Goals: 5 Roy Pollard (3); Jack Cunliffe (2)	Attendance: 4,500

=== 1st Test ===
July 29

New Zealand	16–10	Great Britain
Tries: 2 Des Barchard; Travers Hardwick Goals: 5 Des White (5)	Report; Report; Database	Tries: 2 Roy Pollard; Dickie Williams; Goals: 2 Ernest Ward (2)

Addington Showgrounds, Christchurch
Attendance: 10,000
Referee: Jim Griffin

Team list:

New Zealand: FB: Des White, WG: Jack Forrest, CE: Tommy Baxter, CE: Maurie Robertson, WG: Bevan Hough, FE: Des Barchard, HB: Jim Haig, PR: Cliff Johnson, HK: George Davidson, PR: Jack Newton, SR: Sandy Hurndell, SR: Charlie McBride, LK: Travers Hardwick.

Great Britain: FB: Jimmy Ledgard, WG: Roy Pollard, CE: Ernest Ward, CE: Ernie Ashcroft, WG: Jack Hilton, FE: Dickie Williams, HB: Albert Pepperell, PR: Ken Gee, HK: Joe Egan, PR: Jim Featherstone, SR: Bob Ryan, SR: Fred Higgins, LK: Ken Traill.

July 30	West Coast	15–21	Great Britain	Victoria Park, Greymouth
	Tries: 3 McBride; O'Donnell; Menzies; Goals: 3 Nuttall (2); Newton	[Report Report]	Tries: 5 Harry Murphy (2); Doug Phillips; Jack Cunliffe; Dickie Williams; Goals: 3	Attendance: 5,500

August 5	Auckland	17–26	Great Britain	Carlaw Park, Auckland
	Tries: 3 Maurie Robertson (2); Cliff Johnson; Goals: 4 Des White (4)	[Report Report]	Tries: 6 Tom Danby (3); Dickie Williams (2); Jack Hilton; Goals: 4 Ernest Ward (4)	Attendance: 17,000

August 9	South Auckland	5–51	Great Britain	Davies Park, Huntly
	Tries: 1 Rodgers; Goals: 1 McKenzie	[Report Report]	Tries: 11; Tom Danby (4); Harry Street (2); Jack Hilton (2); Dickie Williams; Jim Featherstone; Albert Pepperell; Goals: 9	Attendance: 4,000

=== 2nd Test ===
August 12

New Zealand	20–13	Great Britain
Tries: 4 Jim Haig (2); Bevan Hough; Maurie Robertson Goals: 4 Des White (2); George Davidson; Jim Haig	Report; Report; Database	Tries: 3 Jim Featherstone; Bob Ryan; Ernest Ward; Goals: 2 Ernest Ward (2)

Carlaw Park, Auckland
Attendance: 20,000
Referee: Jim Griffin

Team list:

New Zealand: FB: Des White, WG: Jack Forrest, CE: Tommy Baxter, CE: Maurie Robertson, WG: Bevan Hough, FE: Des Barchard, HB: Jim Haig, PR: Cliff Johnson, HK: George Davidson, PR: Jack Newton, SR: Sandy Hurndell, SR: Charlie McBride, LK: Travers Hardwick.

Great Britain: FB: Jack Cunliffe, WG: Tom Danby, CE: Ernest Ward, CE: Harry Street, WG: Jack Hilton, FE: Dickie Williams, HB: Tommy Bradshaw, PR: Ken Gee, HK: Joe Egan, PR: Jim Featherstone, SR: Bob Ryan, SR: Fred Higgins, LK: Ken Traill.

== Sources ==
Acronym	Item	Years	Database App	Notes
Direct Online Access
RLN	Rugby League News	1920-1973	Trove	Match Program in Sydney, Team Lists, Team Photos, Articles
RLP	Rugby League Project	1907-present	RLP Website	Test Match teams & scorers.
Sun	The Sun (Sydney)	1910-1954	Trove	Match Reports, Articles.
DT	The Daily Telegraph (Sydney)	1931-1954	Trove	Match Reports, Articles.
CM	The Courier-Mail	1933-1954	Trove	Match Reports, Articles.
-	Various Australian Regional Newspapers	up to 1954	Trove	Match Reports, Given Names of Players
-	New Zealand Newspapers	up to 1950	Papers Past	Match Reports.
Offline Resources
EECYB	E.E. Christensen's Official Rugby League Year Book	1946-1978	Copies at State Library of NSW	Teams, Point Scorers, Report. 1951 Yearbook covers the 1950 tour.
QRLG	Queensland Rugby League Gazette	1950-1955	Copies at State Library of Qld	Program for matches in Brisbane.
-	Ipswich Versus International Teams	1913-1975	Copies at SLQ & NLA	Match Report, Given Names & Club of Ipswich Players
-	Ipswich Rugby League - The Bulimba Cup Era 1925 to 1972	1925-1972	Copies at SLQ & NLA	Given Names & Club of Brisbane, Ipswich & Toowoomba Players
-	A History of Mackay Rugby League	1919-2015	Author's Website	Given Names & Club of Mackay Players
-	More Than The Foley Shield	1908-2014	Author's Website	Match report, team photos. Given Names & Club of North Queensland Players
