= 1983 Queen's Birthday Honours (Australia) =

The 1983 Queen's Birthday Honours for Australia were announced on Monday 13 June 1983 by the office of the Governor-General.

The Birthday Honours were appointments by some of the 16 Commonwealth realms of Queen Elizabeth II to various orders and honours to reward and highlight good works by citizens of those countries. The Birthday Honours are awarded as part of the Queen's Official Birthday celebrations during the month of June.

== Order of Australia ==
=== Knight of the Order of Australia (AK) ===
==== General Division ====
Recipient	Citation	Notes
Ronald Gordon Jackson AC	For service to industry and to the community	

=== Companion (AC) ===
==== General Division ====
Recipient	Citation	Notes
The Honourable David Stirling Hogarth, QC	For service to the legal profession and to the community	
The Honourable Geoffrey Arthur George Lucas, QC	For service to the law	

=== Officer (AO) ===
==== General Division ====
Recipient	Citation	Notes
Andrew Andersons	For service to architecture	
The Honourable Donald Hubert Louis Banfield	For service to the community and parliamentary services	
Professor John Makepeace Bennett	For service to computing science	
David Greenberg Block	For service to the community and commerce	
Richard Alan Bonynge, CBE	For service to music	
Robert Findlay Gibson	For service to architecture	
John Cobell Habersberger	For service to the community	
Dr Edward Frederick Henzell	For public service in the field of agricultural science	
Norman Grantham Hosking	For service to engineering	
Thomas Michael Keneally	For service to literature	
Mervyn Henry Parry, DFC AFC	For service to architecture	
Emeritus Professor Lindsay Dixon Pryor	For service to botanical science	
Professor Charles Cyril Renwick	For service to education and to science	
Grace Cossington Smith, OBE	For service to the visual arts	
Dr Reginald Claude Sprigg	For service to industry, particularly in the fields of geology and petroleum exploration	
Dr Robert Wall	For service to medicine and to the community	

==== Military Division ====
Branch	Recipient	Citation	Notes
Navy	Rear Admiral Geoffrey John Humphrey Woolrych	For service to the Royal Australian Navy, particularly as Chief of Naval Operations Requirements and Plans and as Deputy Chief of Naval Staff	
Army	Major General John David Kelly, DSO	For service to the Australian Army	

=== Member (AM) ===
==== General Division ====
Recipient	Citation	Notes
Gennaro Alfonso Giuseppe Abignano	For services to the construction industry and to the community	
Keith Frederick Alder	For services to the public service	
Dr Allan James Antcliff	For service to horticultural science	
John Edward Atkinson	For service to the Aboriginal arts	
Alfred Paget Beatty	For service to primary industry	
Dr Maurice Berah	For service to medicine, particularly in the field of pathology	
Raymond Berg	For service to architecture	
Phillip Walter Coles	For service to sport	
Peter Gregor Collins	For service to the Public Service	
Ronald John Cotton	For service to accountancy	
Dr William Evan Davies	For service to medicine, particularly the care and welfare of the disabled	
Anne Barbara Deveson	For service to the media	
Frederick Sinclair Dobbin	For service to the community and education	
Sydney James Donovan	For service to the media	
Dr John Henry Temple Ellard	For service to medicine, particularly in the field of psychiatry	
Keith Marshall Ethell	For service to the community, particularly the veterinary profession	
Emeritus Professor John Maxwell Freeland, DFC	For service to architecture, particularly as an historian	
Mary Mansell Gibson	For service to childhood education and to the community	
Henry Charles Gubler	For service to primary industry	
Murray David Haines	For service to education	
Dr Spyros Emanuel Halikis	For service to dentistry	
Staveley Frederick Norton Hickson	For service to commerce	
John Brettell Holliday	For public service	
Dr Roland Adrian Glennie Holmes	For service to the community	
Trevor John Kennedy	For service to the media	
The Reverend Douglas Frederick Kirkup	For service to religion and to the community	
Henry Arthur Llewellyn	For service to the community	
James Sinclair Millner	For service to industry and to the community	
Robert Edward Moors	For service to the arts and to the community, particularly as director of the Moomba Festival	
David Grantley Morgan	For service to education	
John Jackson Morris	For service to the film industry	
George William Muir	For service to education	
The Reverend James Alexander Murray	For service to religion and the community	
George Buchan Ogilvie	For service to the theatre and to the performing arts	
Elaine Phillipa Orr	For service to nursing	
Frederick Henry Phipps	For service to industry	
Dr Geoffrey Howard Pike	For community welfare service in Australia and overseas	
Lindsay Garfield Plane	For service to the welfare of ex-service personnel and to the community	
Mervyn Morris Powell	For service to the horse racing industry and to the community	
Dr Charles Archibald Price	For service to ethnic welfare	
Rex Thomas Reid	For service to the community, in particular to charities that focus on assisting women and children	
William Thomas Schmidt	For public service	
Ian Oswald Spicer	For service to industry and to the community	
Basil Holmes Travers, OBE	For service to education	
Arthur William John Voss	For service to technical education and to the community	
Suzanne Walker	For service to the arts, particularly in the field of crafts	
Florence May Wallace	For service to the community	
John Weir Wilson	For service to the blind	
Murray George Winders	For service to the motor industry	
Ronald John Yates	For service to the aviation industry	
Joan Margaret Young	For service to education and to the community	

==== Military Division ====
Branch	Recipient	Citation	Notes
Navy	Commodore William James Crossley	For service to the Royal Australian Navy, particularly as the Director General of Naval Manpower and Director General of Facilities Branch Navy	
Navy	Lieutenant John Thomas Goss	For service to the Royal Australian Navy, particularly as Head of cooking staff of HMAS Cerberus	
Navy	Principal Chaplain Monsignor Geoffrey Francis Mayne	For service to the Chaplaincy Branch of the Royal Australian Navy	
Navy	Commander Richard John Perry Withycombe Perryman	For service to the Royal Australian Navy, particularly in the field of military communications	
Navy	Commander William Gray Ritchie	For service to the Royal Australian Navy, particularly as Executive Officer, HMAS Stirling	
Navy	Captain David Henry Thomson	For service to the Royal Australian Navy, particularly as the Commanding Officer of HMAS Hobart	
Army	Brigadier Richard Ernest Bird	For service to Army co-ordination and organisation	
Army	Lieutenant Colonel Kevin Edward Coombes	For service to the Australian Army, particularly as Director of the Junior Wing, Reserve Command and Staff College	
Army	Major John Patrick Dinan	For service to the Army Reserve in the field of Officer management	
Army	Lieutenant Colonel Brian Patrick Green	For service to the Australian Army, particularly as 2nd in command of the Field Force Battle School	
Army	Major Ian William McQuire	For service to the Australian Army, particularly in the field of equipment selection and procurement	
Army	Major Ronald Lewis James Northcott	For service to the Australian Army, particularly as the Ceremonial Officer and Chief Marshall for the XII Commonwealth Games	
Army	Colonel Barry Douglas Phillips	For service to the Australian Army, particularly in the field of equipment procurement	
Army	Major Wayne Hayden Ripper	For service to the Army Reserve, particularly as Officer Commanding the 47th Transport Squadron	
Army	Lieutenant Colonel Ronald Thomas Shambrook	For service to the Australian Army, particularly as the Australian Defence Force Project Officer for the XII Commonwealth Games	
Army	Captain Ronald Douglas Squires	For service to the Australian Army, particularly as Quarter Master of the Armoured Centre	
Army	Major Ian Leighton Stewart	For service to the Australian Army, particularly as Officer Commanding the Perth Workshop Company	
Army	Chaplain Second Class Lester Thompson	For service as Staff Chaplain, 2nd Military District and Senior Anglican Chaplain to Headquarters Field Force Command and Headquarters Training Command, Australian Army	
Army	Colonel Maxwell Bruce Tinkler	For service to the Australian Army, particularly in the field of equipment maintenance	
Air Force	Squadron Leader David Andrew Collie	For service as an administrative officer in the Royal Australian Air Force	
Air Force	Flight Lieutenant Allan Lindsay Davidson	For service to the Royal Australian Air Force, particularly as Office in Charge of the Mobile Air Terminal Unit	
Air Force	Group Captain Terence Holyoake	For service to the Royal Australian Air Force, particularly as Commanding Officer, Number 1 Stores Depot.	
Air Force	Group Captain John Burroughs MacNaughtan	For service to the Royal Australian Air Force, particularly as Commanding Officer of Number 481 Maintenance Squadron.	
Air Force	Air Commodore Bernard John Reynolds	For service to the Royal Australian Air Force, particularly as Officer Commanding, RAAF Air Base, Butterworth, Malaysia	
Air Force	Group Captain Douglas Hilton Sinclair	For service to the Royal Australian Air Force, particularly as Director of Personnel Airmen, Department of Defence, Air Force Office	
Air Force	Flight Lieutenant Hugh Osborne Trounson	For service to the Royal Australian Air Force, particularly as Chief Instructor at the Air Movements Training and Development Unit	
Air Force	Squadron Leader Geoffrey Parke Wade	For service to the Royal Australian Air Force, particularly as a Staff Officer in the Directorate of Personnel Services, Department of Defence, Air Force Office	
Air Force	Wing Commander Francis Ian Walke	For service as Principal Reserve Dental Officer, Royal Australian Air Force Reserve Queensland	
Air Force	Wing Commander Terry Charles Arthur Wilson, AFC	For service to the Royal Australian Air Force, particularly as Joint Force Commander, Australian Contingent Multinational Force and Observers	

=== Medal (OAM) ===
==== General Division ====
Recipient	Citation	Notes
Adikuiam Adidi	For service to Aboriginal welfare	
Wilfred Percy Allinson	For service to the community as a volunteer worker for the XII Commonwealth Games	
Margaret Roblin Allwright	For service to nursing	
Glenys Fay Anderson	For service to the community and conservation	
Ethel May Anderson	For service to the community	
Neville Thomas Andrews	For service to industry and to trade unionism	
Vivienne Ashcroft	For service to youth welfare and to the community	
Ernest Askew	For service to the community	
Alfred Fredress Bennett	For service to the community	
James Sylvester Bennie	For service to the community	
Maynard Harding Bills	For service to the deaf	
Owen Fendick Blattman	For service to the community	
Harold Patrick Boland	For service to the community and the welfare of ex-service personnel	
Dr James Hugh Bray	For service to the poultry industry	
Alan George Bray	For service to the community	
Richard Paull Septimus Burt	For service to the community	
Dorothy Joan Louise Caelli	For service to the sport of gymnastics	
Alderman George Albert Edward Cayley	For services to the community and local government	
Councillor Alan Reginald Clark	For service to the local government and to the community	
Robert Bruce Comben	For service to the community and local government	
Kevin Richard Coombs	For service to sport for the disabled and to Aboriginal welfare	
Graham Studley Cornes	For service to the sport of Australian rules football	
Kevin Craik	For service to the welfare of youth	
Ernest Alfred Crome	For service to the community, particularly as a benefactor of historical objects	
Jean Davenport	For service to the community	
Brian Kilmaine De Courcy-Ireland	For service to the community and local government	
Alderman Julie Barbara Dearing	For service to the community and local government	
Allan Temple Dingle	For service to the community	
Elsie May Drummond	For service to the sport of ladies bowls	
Geoffrey Dymock	For service to the sport of cricket	
Nellie Mary Escott	For service to the community	
Henry Edwin Fairall	For service to the community	
Margaret Isobel Fulton	For service to the media as a journalist and writer in the field of cookery	
John Alexander Selwyn Geddes	For service to the community and to local government	
Alfred Yule Llewellyn Gillam	For service to the community	
Albert John Goggins	For service to local government and the community	
Martin Joseph Gooley	For service to the community	
Margaret Green	For service to disabled children	
Ernest Donald Hackney	For service to the community	
Lillian Ruth Harrison	For service to education	
John Pinkerton Hayes	For service to disabled children	
Vincent Patrick Heffernan	For service to local government and to the community	
William James Hodgins	For service to junior football and to the community	
Dr Ernest Pease Hodgkin	For service to natural science and to the community	
Bernard Augustine Hodgman	For service to the community	
Kevin John Hogan	For service to the sports of cricket and football	
Robert Malcolm Hooper	For service to sport, particularly cricket and football, and to the community	
Oliver James Hughan	For service to the welfare of ex-service personnel	
Senior Sergeant Carolus Isua	For public service in the field of Aboriginal welfare	
John William George Joel, BEM	For service to the community	
Marjorie Gowling Johnson	For service to the arts, particularly the field of crafts	
Ronald Samuel Johnston	For service to the furniture industry	
Ronald Norman Jones	For service to the community	
Pelagia Peter Kakulas	For service to ethnic welfare	
David Anthony Keating	For service to sport during the XII Commonwealth Games	
The Reverend Father Michael Kelly	For service to the community	
Margaret Johannah Kelsh	For service to the community	
Thomas Albert David Kennedy	For service to the horseracing industry	
Frederick Kirkland	For service to the welfare of ex-service personnel and to the community	
Leonard James Kittle	For service to the community	
Paraskevi Vivi Koutsounadis	For service to ethnic welfare	
Marjorie Lina Ladkin	For service to nursing	
Dorothy Yvonne Laver	For service to local government and to the community	
Giuseppe Lo Schiavo	For service to ethnic welfare	
Mary Linton Thorne Loder	For service to nursing	
Ian Francis Martin	For service to the maize industry	
Donald Robert Muir Mason	For service to legal government and the community	
Norman Alfred Vale May	For service to the media	
Robert Thomas McAnally	For service to the disabled	
Dr Amy Gladys McGrath	For service to the theatre	
Marea Victoria Meyers	For service to the community	
Peter John Murphy	For service to the community	
Eric Leonard Myatt	For service to the sport of junior cricket	
Jeanie Merry Nash	For service to the community	
Nora Nelligan	For service to the sport of swimming	
Doris Eleanor Nicholls	For service to scouting	
Rita Jane Nightingall	For service to education, particularly speech development by the disabled	
Ernest Joseph O'Donnell	For public service	
Peter Joseph O'Halloran	For service to education, particularly in the field of mathematics	
John Archibald Owens	For service to the disabled	
Frederick Eugene Peterson	For service to trade unionism	
William Arthur Prenzler	For service to the welfare of ex-service personnel	
John Ward Rees	For service to local government and to the community	
Kathleen Mary Barbara Ridley	For service to the community	
Dianne Roberts	For service to Aboriginal welfare	
Alfred Schulmeister	For service to medicine, particularly as a prosthetist	
Edith Irene Seymour-Hudak	For service to the community	
Peter John Patrick Shield	For service to the dry-cleaning industry	
Antonina Skoroszewski	For service to ethnic welfare	
Hilda Mary Spicer	For service to the welfare of ex-service personnel and to the community	
Len Clem Stevens	For service to the honey industry	
Patricia Jean Walker	For service to the sport of squash	
Donald Eric Wallin	For public service	
James Wilfred Warburton	For service to the community	
David Watson	For service to the plumbing industry	
Dorothy Ann Watters	For service to the community	
Shirlee Catherine Williams	For public service	
Dulcie Jean Wilson	For service to nursing and to the community	

==== Military Division ====
Branch	Recipient	Citation	Notes
Navy	Warrant Officer Max Berger	For service to the Royal Australian Navy, particularly as Deputy Marine Engineer Officer, HMAS Canberra	
Navy	Warrant Officer James Edwin Burton	For service to the Royal Australian Navy, particularly as Works Property Officer, HMAS Watson	
Navy	Warrant Officer Robert William Gale	For service to the Royal Australian Navy, particularly as Divisional Officer in the Supply School, HMAS Cerberus	
Navy	Chief Petty Officer Christopher Donald Gallagher	For service to Fleet Tactical Communications in the Royal Australian Navy and as an instructor in the Communications School, HMAS Cerberus	
Navy	Warrant Officer Geoffry Alan Russell	For service in the training of musicians in the Royal Australian Navy School of Music	
Navy	Chief Petty Officer WRAN Maureen Ann Weir	For service to the Royal Australian Navy, particularly as Motor Transport Controller, HMAS Albatross	
Army	Sergeant Malcolm Raymond Bishop	For service to the Australian Army, particularly as a radio operator with 6th Battalion, RAR	
Army	Warrant Officer Class One David Laurence Cave	For services to the Australian Army, particularly in the field of personnel management in the Royal Australian Corps of Signals	
Army	Warrant Officer Class One Philip John Clark	For service to the Australian Army, particularly as an instructor at the School of Army Health	
Army	Warrant Officer Class One William Hugh Dempster	For service to the Australian Army, particularly as Manning Section Supervisor, Central Army Records Office, Melbourne	
Army	Sergeant Stephen Charles Facer	For service to the Royal Australian Infantry	
Army	Warrant Officer Class Two John William Gillan	For service to the Australian Army, particularly as Cadet Group Liaison Warrant Officer with the 1st Cadet Group	
Army	Warrant Officer Class One Raymond Barrett Hartigan	For service to the Australian Army, particularly as the Regimental Sergeant Major Army Apprentice School	
Army	Corporal Kristeen Ann Lewis	For service to the Australian Army, particularly as a personal driver to senior army commanders	
Army	Sergeant Daniel Robert McIver	For service to the Australian Army, particularly as a technical storeman in support of the XII Commonwealth Games	
Army	Warrant Officer Class Two Eileen Pritchard	For service to the Australian Army, particularly as a Clerk Administration with the 49th Battalion The Royal Queensland Regiment	
Army	Warrant Officer Class One Walter Raymond Robinson	For service to the Australian Army, particularly as Training Warrant Officer, 14th Field Squadron, 4th Field Engineer Regiment	
Army	Corporal Lynne Veronica Sage	For service to the Australian Army, particularly as Unit Pay Representative and Chief Clerk of the 1st Base Workshop Battalion	
Air Force	Warrant Officer Donald Leslie Bray	For service to the Royal Australian Air Force, particularly as a mess supervisor	
Air Force	Warrant Officer Allen Richard Burgess	For service to the Royal Australian Air Force, particularly as an engineer	
Air Force	Sergeant David William Gardner	For service to the Royal Australian Air Force, particularly as an airframe fitter at No 2 Squadron	
Air Force	Sergeant Barry Norris Haskins	For service to Royal Australian Air Force, particularly as an airframe fitter at Number 2 Flying Training School	
Air Force	Flight Sergeant Robert Hogan	For service to the Royal Australian Air Force, particularly as an instructor at the RAAF School of Technical Training	
Air Force	Warrant Officer Brian Clifford Jones	For service to the Royal Australian Air Force, particularly at No 2 Stores Depot	
Air Force	Warrant Officer Anthony Charles Muspratt	For service to the Royal Australian Air Force, particularly as a Warrant Officer Engineer with the Australian Contingent to the Multinational Force Observers in the Sinai	
