= Ronald Yates =

Ronald Yates may refer to:

- Ronald John Yates (died 2012), CEO of Qantas
- Ronald W. Yates (born 1938), U.S. Air Force officer

== See also ==
- Ron Yeats (pronounced Yates, 1937–2024), Scottish footballer for Liverpool F.C.
