= 1949–50 Lancashire Cup =

- Structure: Regional knockout championship
- Teams: 14
- Winners: Wigan
- Runners-up: Leigh

The 1949–50 Lancashire Cup competition was the 37th Rugby League Lancashire Cup. In the final, Wigan beat Leigh 20–7 to win the trophy. Thirty-five thousand people attended the match, which took place at Wilderspool, Warrington with receipts of £4,751. The attendance was the second-highest to date for the competition (for further information see Rugby league county cups). This was the fourth of Wigan's record-breaking run of six consecutive Lancashire Cup victories.

== Background ==
Overall, 14 teams entered this competition, the same number as in 1948, with Whitehaven being newly elected into the Rugby League at the start of the 1949–50 season, replacing the prior season's junior/amateur club entrant. No junior/amateur club took part during the 1949–50 season. The same pre-war fixture format was retained, with no bye, but one "blank" or "dummy" fixture in the first round. The second round contained one bye, but no "blank" fixture. As in the 1948–49 competition, all the first round matches were played on the basis of two legged (home and away) ties, and the remainder of the rounds on straight forward knock-out basis.

== Competition and results ==
=== Round 1 ===
7 matches (with no bye and one "blank" fixture) involving 14 clubs.

Game No	Fixture date	Home team	Score	Away team	Venue	agg	Att	Rec	Notes	Ref
1	Sat 27 Aug 1949	Belle Vue Rangers	18–2	Rochdale Hornets	Belle Vue Stadium					
2	Sat 27 Aug 1949	Liverpool Stanley	0–41	Leigh	Stanley Greyhound Stadium					
3	Sat 27 Aug 1949	St. Helens	0–7	Workington Town	Knowsley Road		15,000			
4	Sat 27 Aug 1949	Salford	9–22	Warrington	The Willows					
5	Sat 27 Aug 1949	Whitehaven	3–2	Swinton	Recreation Ground				1	
6	Sat 27 Aug 1949	Widnes	11–2	Barrow	Naughton Park					
7	Sat 27 Aug 1949	Wigan	45–14	Oldham	Central Park					
8		blank		blank						

=== Round 1 – second leg ===
7 matches (with no bye and one "blank" fixture) involving 14 clubs. These are the reverse fixture from the first leg.

Game No	Fixture date	Home team	Score	Away team	Venue	agg	Att	Rec	Notes	Ref
1	Wed 31 Aug 1949	Rochdale Hornets	5–5	Belle Vue Rangers	Athletic Grounds	7–23				
2	Wed 31 Aug 1949	Leigh	38–7	Liverpool Stanley	Kirkhall Lane	79–7				
3	Wed 31 Aug 1949	Workington Town	7–4	St. Helens	Borough Park	14–4	14,256			
4	Wed 31 Aug 1949	Warrington	17–2	Salford	Wilderspool	39–11				
5	Wed 31 Aug 1949	Swinton	23–2	Whitehaven	Station Road	25–5				
6	Wed 31 Aug 1949	Barrow	7–5	Widnes	Craven Park	9–16				
7	Wed 31 Aug 1949	Oldham	19–9	Wigan	Watersheddings	33–54				
8		blank		blank						

=== Round 2 – quarterfinals ===
3 matches (with one bye) involving 7 clubs.

Game No	Fixture date	Home team	Score	Away team	Venue	agg	Att	Rec	Notes	Ref
1	Wed 14 Sep 1949	Warrington	45–7	Belle Vue Rangers	Wilderspool					
2	Wed 14 Sep 1949	Wigan	33–13	Swinton	Central Park					
3	Wed 14 Sep 1949	Workington Town	18–5	Widnes	Borough Park					
4		Leigh		bye						

=== Round 3 – semifinals ===
2 matches involving 4 clubs.

Game No	Fixture date	Home team	Score	Away team	Venue	agg	Att	Rec	Notes	Ref
1	Mon 03 Oct 1949	Leigh	10–7	Warrington	Kirkhall Lane					
2	Mon 03 Oct 1949	Wigan	30–17	Workington Town	Central Park					

=== Final ===
Game No	Fixture date	Home team	Score	Away team	Venue	agg	Att	Rec	Notes	Ref
	Saturday 29 October 1949	Wigan	20–7	Leigh	Wilderspool		35,000	£4,751	2	

==== Teams and scorers ====
Wigan	№	Leigh
Martin Ryan	1	Jimmy Ledgard
Jack Hilton	2	Jack Wood
Jack Cunliffe	3	Norman Harris
Ernie Ashcroft	4	Edward Kerwick
Brian Nordgren	5	Nebby Cleworth
Ces Mountford	6	Jimmy Rowe
Tommy Bradshaw	7	Peter Riley
Ken Gee	8	Alf Edge
Joe Egan	9	Terry Stephens
Ted Slevin	10	Reg Wheatley
Bill Hudson	11	Ces Ryan
Frank Barton	12	Charlie Pawsey
Billy Blan	13	Jeff Burke
20	score	7
8	HT	2
	Scorers	
	Tries	
Brian Nordgren (4)	T	Cleworth (1)
Billy Blan (1)	T	
Jack Hilton (1)	T	
	Goals	
Ken Gee (1)	G	Jimmy Ledgard (2)
Referee		G. S. Phillips, Widnes

Scoring: Try = three (3) points; Goal = two (2) points; Drop goal = two (2) points

=== Tournament bracket ===
All the first round ties were played on a two leg (home and away) basis. The first club named in the first round played the first leg at home. The scores shown in the first round are the aggregate score over the two legs.

First round
Wigan	54
Oldham	33
Whitehaven	5
Swinton	25
St. Helens	4
Workington Town	14
Widnes	16
Barrow	9
Liverpool Stanley	7
Leigh	79
blank
blank
Salford	11
Warrington	39
Belle Vue Rangers	23
Rochdale Hornets	7

Second round
Wigan	33
Swinton	13
Workington Town	18
Widnes	5
Leigh
bye
Warrington	45
Belle Vue Rangers	7

Semifinals
Wigan	30
Workington Town	17
Leigh	10
Warrington	7

Final
Wigan	20
Leigh	7

== Notes and comments ==
1 * This was the first Lancashire Cup match to be played by Whitehaven as well as being the first match at this stadium.
2 * Wilderspool was the home ground of Warrington from 1883 through the 2003 summer season, after which they moved into the new Halliwell Jones Stadium. Wilderspool remained a sports/Rugby League facility, used by the Woolston Rovers/Warrington Wizards junior club. It had a final capacity of 9,000 although the record attendance was set in a Challenge cup third round match on 13 March 1948, when 34,304 spectators saw Warrington lose to Wigan 13–10.

== See also ==
- 1949–50 Northern Rugby Football League season
- Rugby league county cups
