= Doug Phillips (rugby) =

Former GB & Wales international rugby league footballer

Douglas Versailles Phillips

Personal information
- Born: 28 June 1919; Neath, Wales
- Died: 28 April 2000 (aged 80); Neath, Wales

Playing information
- Height: 6 ft 2 in (1.9 m)
- Weight: 14 st 7 lb (92.1 kg)

Rugby union
Club
| Years | Team | Pld | T | G | FG | P |
|---|---|---|---|---|---|---|
| | Swansea RFC |
Representative
| Years | Team | Pld | T | G | FG | P |
| | Glamorgan | 2 |

Rugby league
- Position: Second-row
Club
| Years | Team | Pld | T | G | FG | P |
|---|---|---|---|---|---|---|
| 1945–46 | Oldham | 18 | 0 | 0 | 0 | 0 |
| 1947–53 | Belle Vue Rangers | 235 | 28 | 0 | 0 | 84 |
| | Total | 253 | 28 | 0 | 0 | 84 |
Representative
| Years | Team | Pld | T | G | FG | P |
| 1945–51 | Wales | 10 | 1 | 0 | 0 | 3 |
| 1944–50 | Great Britain | 4 | 0 | 0 | 0 | 0 |

Douglas Versailles Phillips (28 June 1919 – 28 April 2000) was a Welsh rugby union, and professional rugby league footballer who played in the 1940s and 1950s. He played representative level rugby union for Glamorgan (two occasions), and at club level for Swansea RFC. Having switched codes to rugby league he played representative level rugby league for Great Britain and Wales; and at club level for Oldham and Belle Vue Rangers, as a second-row.

== Early life ==
Phillips was born in Neath, Wales on the day the Treaty of Versailles was signed and as a result was given the middle name of Versailles. As a schoolboy he played rugby union for Neath Schoolboys and was playing for Swansea RFC's first team when aged only 18. Two appearances for Glamorgan followed as well as two trials for the Welsh national side before the Second World War intervened and Phillips joined the army. During the war Phillips played for the Combined Services XV and featured in a rugby union match at Odsal Stadium, Bradford in April 1944 against the Combined Services rugby league XV. Phillips scored the opening try of the game although the league XV ran out 15–10 winners. Opposing Phillips in the rugby league XV were three players he would later tour Australia and New Zealand with; Ernest Ward, Ike Owens and Trevor Foster. Phillips performance in this game brought him to the attention of several rugby league clubs and he signed for Oldham towards the end of 1944.

== Rugby league playing career ==
=== Club career ===
Phillips début for Oldham was on 17 February 1945 in a 16–0 victory over Batley. His army service presented Phillips from playing regularly and by the end of the 1945–46 season he had made only eight appearances for Oldham but had done enough to be called up to play both for Wales and Great Britain.

Following his return from Australia and New Zealand in September 1946 Phillips played 10 more games for Oldham before being transferred to Belle Vue Rangers in January 1947 for a £1,000 transfer fee.

Remaining with Belle Vue Rangers until 1953, Phillips made 253 appearances for the team scoring 28 tries. He made one appearance in the Lancashire County Cup final as Rangers lost 7–10 against Wigan in the 1947–48 final at Wilderspool Stadium, Warrington on 1 November 1947.

He retired from rugby league in April 1953 and returned to Neath.

=== International career ===
Phillips was first selected to play for Wales in 1945 and went on to win 10 caps between 1945 and 1951 scoring a try in a game against England in 1949. Phillips was also selected to play for Great Britain and was a member of both the 1946 and 1950 touring teams to Australia and New Zealand being capped four times (three in 1946, one in 1950) against Australia.
