= 1947–48 Lancashire Cup =

English, regional, rugby football competition

- Structure: Regional knockout championship
- Teams: 14
- Winners: Wigan
- Runners-up: Belle Vue Rangers

The 1947–48 Lancashire Cup was the thirty-fifth occasion on which the Lancashire Cup competition had been held.

Wigan won the trophy by beating Belle Vue Rangers by the score of 10–7

The match was played at Wilderspool, Warrington, (historically in the county of Lancashire). The attendance was 23,310 and receipts were £3,043.

This was the second of Wigan's record breaking run of six consecutive Lancashire Cup victories.

It was also to be the second of two consecutive finals to be competed for by these two teams.

== Background ==
Overall, the number of teams entering this year's competition increased by one with the invitation to Lancashire Amateurs (a junior/amateur club) bringing the total up to 14.

The same pre-war fixture format was retained. This season saw no bye but one "blank" or "dummy" fixture in the first round. There was also one bye but no "blank" fixture" in the second round.

As last season, all the first round matches of the competition will be played on the basis of two legged, home and away ties. However this year, the second round becomes a straightforward knock-out basis.

== Competition and results ==
=== Round 1 ===
Involved 7 matches (with no bye and one "blank" fixture) and 14 clubs

Game No	Fixture date	Home team	Score	Away team	Venue	agg	Att	Rec	Notes	Ref
1	Sat 30 Aug 1947	Barrow	14–12	Belle Vue Rangers	Craven Park					
2	Sat 30 Aug 1947	Lancashire Amateurs	5–16	Rochdale Hornets	Watersheddings				1	
3	Sat 30 Aug 1947	Leigh	0–15	St. Helens	Kirkhall Lane		16,000		2 3	
4	Sat 30 Aug 1947	Liverpool Stanley	3–26	Oldham	Stanley Greyhound Stadium					
5	Sat 30 Aug 1947	Swinton	2–19	Workington Town	Station Road					
6	Sat 30 Aug 1947	Widnes	4–8	Salford	Naughton Park					
7	Sat 30 Aug 1947	Wigan	16–13	Warrington	Central Park					
8		blank		blank						

=== Round 1 – second leg ===
Involved 7 matches (with no bye and one "blank" fixture) and 14 clubs. These are the reverse fixture from the first leg

Game No	Fixture date	Home team	Score	Away team	Venue	agg	Att	Rec	Notes	Ref
1	Wed 10 Sep 1947	Belle Vue Rangers	37–2	Barrow	Belle Vue Stadium	49–16				
2	Tue 2 Sep 1947	Rochdale Hornets	7–2	Lancashire Amateurs	Athletic Grounds	23–7			1	
3	Thu 4 Sep 1947	St. Helens	31–5	Leigh	Knowsley Road	46–5	17,000			
4	Tue 2 Sep 1947	Oldham	16–3	Liverpool Stanley	Watersheddings	42–6				
5	Wed 3 Sep 1947	Workington Town	15–12	Swinton	Borough Park	34–14				
6	Wed 3 Sep 1947	Salford	9–4	Widnes	The Willows	17–8				
7	Wed 3 Sep 1947	Warrington	10–15	Wigan	Wilderspool	23–31				
8		blank		blank						

=== Round 2 – quarterfinals – first leg ===
Involved 3 matches (with one bye) and 7 clubs

Game No	Fixture date	Home team	Score	Away team	Venue	agg	Att	Rec	Notes	Ref
1	Tue 23 Sep 1947	Oldham	3–13	Workington Town	Watersheddings					
2	Mon 29 Sep 1947	St. Helens	7–8	Wigan	Knowsley Road					
3	Wed 1 Oct 1947	Belle Vue Rangers	10–5	Salford	Belle Vue Stadium					
4		Rochdale Hornets		bye						

=== Round 3 – semifinals ===
Involved 2 matches and 4 clubs

Game No	Fixture date	Home team	Score	Away team	Venue	agg	Att	Rec	Notes	Ref
1	Wed 8 Oct 1947	Belle Vue Rangers	15–8	Workington Town	Belle Vue Stadium					
2	Wed 8 Oct 1947	Wigan	27–3	Rochdale Hornets	Central Park					

=== Final ===
Game No	Fixture date	Home team	Score	Away team	Venue	agg	Att	Rec	Notes	Ref
	Saturday 1 November 1947	Wigan	10–7	Belle Vue Rangers	Wilderspool		23,110	£3,043	4	

==== Teams and scorers ====
Wigan	No.	Belle Vue Rangers
	teams	
Martin Ryan	1	W. Ratchford
Gordon Ratcliffe	2	Harry Pimblett
Ted Ward	3	Mel Tierney
George Roughley	4	Stan McCormick
Brian Nordgren	5	S. Jolley
Ernie Ashcroft	6	Ray Price
Tommy Bradshaw	7	Billy Watkins
Ken Gee	8	D. Thomas
Joe Egan	9	W. Flanagan
George Banks	10	Elwyn Gwyther
Les White	11	Doug Phillips
Billy Blan	12	Jack Fearnley
Jack Blan	13	Dick Manning
10	score	7
5	HT	2
	Scorers	
	Tries	
Gordon Ratcliffe (1)	T	Flanagan (1)
Brian Nordgren (1)	T	
	Goals	
Ted Ward (2)	G	D. Thomas (2)
Referee		S. Manley (Hull)

Scoring – Try = three (3) points – Goal = two (2) points – Drop goal = two (2) points

=== The road to success ===
All the first round ties were played on a two leg (home and away) basis.

The first club named in each of the first round ties played the first leg at home.

the scores shown in the first round are the aggregate score over the two legs.

First round
Leigh	5
St. Helens	46
Wigan	31
Warrington	23
Lancashire Amateurs	7
Rochdale Hornets	23
blank
blank
Barrow	16
Belle Vue Rangers	49
Widnes	8
Salford	17
Liverpool Stanley	6
Oldham	42
Swinton	14
Workington Town	34

Second round
St. Helens	7
Wigan	8
Rochdale Hornets
bye
Belle Vue Rangers	10
Salford	5
Oldham	3
Workington Town	13

Semifinals
Wigan	27
Rochdale Hornets	3
Belle Vue Rangers	15
Workington Town	8

Final
Wigan	10
Belle Vue Rangers	7

== Notes and comments ==
1 * Lancashire Amateurs were a junior (or amateur) club from Lancashire. The match was played at Watersheddings, Oldham

2 * The official St. Helens archive show as attendance of 16,000 (with 17,000 for the second leg at home) RUGBY LEAGUE projects show it as 17,000

3 * Leigh's first Lancashire Cup match at the newly completed purpose build stadium

4 * Wilderspool was the home ground of Warrington from 1883 to the end of the 2003 Summer season when they moved into the new purpose-built Halliwell Jones Stadium. Wilderspool remained as a sports/Ruugby League ground and is/was used by Woolston Rovers/Warrington Wizards junior club.

The ground had a final capacity of 9,000 although the record attendance was set in a Challenge cup third round match on 13 March 1948 when 34,304 spectators saw Warrington lose to Wigan 10–13.

== See also ==
- 1947–48 Northern Rugby Football League season
- Rugby league county cups
