= Danny Naughton =

England international rugby league footballer

Daniel Naughton
Personal information
- Born: 24 December 1924; Prescot district, England
- Died: April 1992 (aged 67)

Playing information
- Position: Prop
Club
Years	Team	Pld	T	G	FG	P
1946–52	Widnes	189	23	0	0	69
1953–56	Warrington	130	3	0	0	9
	Total	319	26	0	0	78
Representative
Years	Team	Pld	T	G	FG	P
1949	England	1	0	0	0	0
1949–51	Lancashire	3	1	0	0	3
- Relatives: Albert Naughton (brother)

Daniel "Danny" Naughton (24 December 1924 – April 1992) was an English professional rugby league footballer who played in the 1940s and 1950s. He played at representative level for Great Britain (non-Test matches), and England, and at club level for Widnes and Warrington, as a prop.

== Background ==
Danny Naughton's birth was registered in Prescot district, Lancashire, England.

== Playing career ==
=== Club career ===
Naughton was absent from Widnes' 0-19 defeat by Warrington in the 1949–50 Challenge Cup Final during the 1949–50 season at Wembley Stadium, London on Saturday 6 May 1950, due to being on the 1950 Great Britain Lions tour to Australia, and New Zealand, though he did not participate in any of the test matches.

Naughton played at prop in Warrington's 4-4 draw with Halifax in the 1953–54 Challenge Cup Final during the 1953–54 season at Wembley Stadium, London on Saturday 24 April 1954, in front of a crowd of 81,841, and played at prop in the 8-4 victory over Halifax in the 1953–54 Challenge Cup Final replay during the 1953–54 season at Odsal Stadium, Bradford on Wednesday 5 May 1954, in front of a record crowd of 102,575 or more.

=== International honours ===
Naughton won caps for England while at Widnes in 1949 against Other Nationalities.

== Personal life ==
Danny Naughton was the younger brother of the rugby league second-row who played in the 1940s and 1950s for Widnes; John "Johnny" Naughton (born 5 January 1920 in Prescot district), and the older brother of the rugby league footballer, Albert "Ally" Naughton.
