= Ernest Pollard (rugby league) =

GB & England international rugby league footballer

- Ogden's Cigarette card featuring Ernest Pollard

Personal information
- Full name: Ernest Pollard
- Born: fourth ¼ 1910 Wakefield district, England
- Died: unknown

Playing information
- Position: Centre, Stand-off
Club
Years	Team	Pld	T	G	FG	P
1927–36	Wakefield Trinity	260	54	319	0	800
1936–37	Leeds	40	11	108	0	249
1937–38	Bradford Northern	35	3	43	0	95
	Total	335	68	470	0	1144
Representative
Years	Team	Pld	T	G	FG	P
1930–37	Yorkshire	8	2	6	0	18
1932	England	2	1	1	0	5
1932	Great Britain	2	1	0	0	3

Coaching information
Club
Years	Team	Gms	W	D	L	W%
	York
- Relatives: Roy Pollard (nephew); Charlie Pollard (brother)

Ernest Pollard (fourth ¼ 1910 – death unknown) was an English professional rugby league footballer who played in the 1920s and 1930s. He played at representative level for Great Britain, England and Yorkshire, and at club level for Wakefield Trinity (captain), Leeds and Bradford Northern, as a centre or stand-off. Ernie Pollard's career was ended in October 1938 when he suffered a severe knee injury.

== Background ==
Pollard's birth was registered in Wakefield district, West Riding of Yorkshire, England.

== Playing career ==
=== Club career ===
Pollard is the second youngest player to make his début for Wakefield Trinity aged 16-years and 4-months in 1927, the youngest player being Richard Goddard, he made his début for Wakefield Trinity during March 1927.

Pollard played at centre in Wakefield Trinity's 0–8 defeat by Leeds in the 1932 Yorkshire Cup Final during the 1932–33 season at Fartown Ground, Huddersfield on Saturday 19 November 1932, at centre and scored a goal in the 5–5 draw with Leeds in the 1934 Yorkshire Cup Final during the 1934–35 season at Crown Flatt, Dewsbury on Saturday 27 October 1934, played stand-off, and scored a goal in the 2–2 draw with Leeds in the 1934 Yorkshire Cup Final replay during the 1934–35 season at Fartown Ground, Huddersfield on Wednesday 31 October 1934, and played at centre in the 0–13 defeat by Leeds in the 1934 Yorkshire Cup Final second replay during the 1934–35 season at Parkside, Hunslet on Wednesday 7 November 1934.

=== Representative honours ===
Pollard won caps for England while at Wakefield Trinity in 1932 against Wales (2 matches), and won caps for Great Britain while at Wakefield Trinity in 1932 against Australia (2 matches).

Pollard won cap(s) for Yorkshire while at Wakefield Trinity.

== Coaching career ==
In September 1950, Pollard was appointed as coach by York.

== Personal life ==
Ernest Pollard was the father of the Wakefield RFC rugby union footballer from 1956 to 1958, Anthony Pollard. He was the younger brother of the rugby league footballer Charles Pollard, and the older brother of the Wakefield Trinity fullback of the 1930s Lionel Pollard, and was the uncle of the rugby league footballer, Roy Pollard, Oxford University RFC, Wakefield RFC, Colwyn Bay RFC and North Wales rugby (captain) rugby union footballer.
