= Frank Osmond =

GB & Wales international rugby league footballer

Personal information
- Full name: Frank Francis Osmond
- Born: 31 January 1920; Newport, Monmouthshire, Wales
- Died: January 1973 (aged 52–53)

Playing information

Rugby union
- Position: Hooker
Club
Years	Team	Pld	T	G	FG	P
1939–47	Newport RFC	32	3

Rugby league
- Position: Hooker
Club
Years	Team	Pld	T	G	FG	P
1947–≥51	Swinton
Representative
Years	Team	Pld	T	G	FG	P
1948–51	Great Britain	0
1950	Wales	14

Frank Francis Osmond (31 January 1920 – January 1973) was a Welsh rugby union, and professional rugby league footballer who played in the 1930s, 1940s and 1950s. He played club level rugby union (RU) for Newport RFC, as a hooker, and representative level rugby league (RL) for Great Britain (non-Test matches), and Wales, and at club level for Swinton, as a hooker.

== Background ==
Frank Osmond was born in Newport, Monmouthshire, Wales.

== Playing career ==
=== Club career ===
Osmond made his debut for Swinton in 1947.

=== International honours ===
Frank Osmond represented Great Britain (RL) while at Swinton in non-Test matches on the 1950 Great Britain Lions tour of Australasia, and won 14 caps for Wales (RL) in 1948–1951 while at Swinton.
