= Bob Ryan (rugby league) =

GB & England international rugby league footballer

Personal information
- Full name: Robert Ryan
- Born: 1923 Wigan, England
- Died: 25 October 2009 (aged 85-86) Warrington, England

Playing information
- Weight: 13 st 10 lb (87 kg)
- Position: Second-row, Loose forward
Club
Years	Team	Pld	T	G	FG	P
1945–58	Warrington	372	37	0	0	111
Representative
Years	Team	Pld	T	G	FG	P
1950–52	England	2	0	0	0	0
1950–52	Great Britain	5	1	0	0	3
1947–55	Lancashire	4	0	0	0	0

Robert Ryan (1923 – 25 October 2009) was an English professional rugby league footballer who played in the 1940s and 1950s. He played at representative level for Great Britain and England, and at club level for Triangle Valve ARLFC and Warrington, as a second-row, or loose forward.

== Playing career ==
=== International honours ===
Ryan won caps for England while at Warrington in 1950 against France, in 1952 against Other Nationalities, and won caps for Great Britain while at Warrington on the 1950 Great Britain Lions tour against Australia, and New Zealand (2 matches), in 1951 against New Zealand, and in 1952 against Australia.

=== Championship final appearances ===
Ryan played at second-row in Warrington's 15–5 victory over Bradford Northern in the Championship Final during the 1947–48 season at Maine Road, Manchester.

=== Challenge Cup Final appearances ===
Ryan played loose forward in Warrington's 4–4 draw with Halifax in the 1953–54 Challenge Cup Final during the 1953–54 season at Wembley Stadium, London on Saturday 24 April 1954, in front of a crowd of 81,841, and played loose forward in the 8–4 victory over Halifax in the 1953–54 Challenge Cup Final replay during the 1953–54 season at Odsal Stadium, Bradford on Wednesday 5 May 1954, in front of a record crowd of 102,575 or more.

=== County Cup Final appearances ===
Ryan played at second-row in Warrington's 5–28 defeat by Wigan in the 1950–51 Lancashire Cup Final during the 1950–51 season at Station Road, Swinton on Saturday 4 November 1950.

=== Club career ===
Ryan made his début for Warrington on Saturday, 6 October 1945, and he played his last match for Warrington on Saturday, 8 March 1958.

== Honoured at Warrington Wolves ==
Bob Ryan is a Warrington Wolves Hall of Fame inductee.
