= Brian Nordgren =

NZ rugby league footballer and coach

Personal information
- Full name: Brian Carl Lloyd Nordgren
- Born: 23 October 1925 Greymouth, New Zealand
- Died: 15 May 2007 (aged 81) Hamilton, New Zealand

Playing information
- Position: Wing
Club
Years	Team	Pld	T	G	FG	P
1944–45	Ponsonby	27	28	53	0	217
1946–55	Wigan	294	312	109	0	1154
	Total	321	340	162	0	1371
Representative
Years	Team	Pld	T	G	FG	P
1945	Auckland	5	17	20	0	91
1945	Auckland Pākehā	1	1	5	0	13
1945	North Island	1	1	0	0	3
1950	Other Nationalities	1	0	0	0	0

Coaching information
Club
Years	Team	Gms	W	D	L	W%
	Ponsonby

Brian Carl Lloyd Nordgren (23 October 1925 – 15 May 2007) was a New Zealand rugby league player who played professionally for Wigan.

== Early years ==
Born in Greymouth in 1926, Nordgren grew up in a Christchurch orphanage. He successfully joined the Army in 1940, claiming to be almost 18. However, in 1944, while awaiting shipment to Europe, a family member revealed he was only 17, and he was discharged.

== Playing career ==
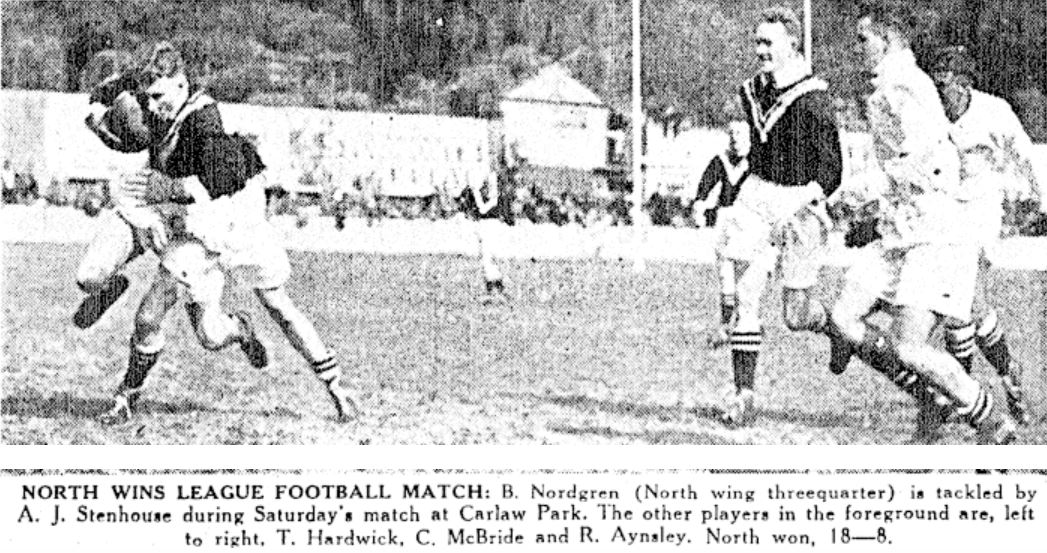
Nordgren with the ball for the North Island team in their match with the South Island at Carlaw Park on October 6, 1945.

Nordgren joined Ponsonby in 1944, scoring 5 tries. In the following season he scored 156 points in the Auckland Rugby League competition for Ponsonby which was an Auckland senior club record. In an exhibition match between Ponsonby and Mt Albert in Cambridge, Waikato he scored a try and kicked 8 goals. He also represented Auckland and scored 91 points from just 5 games including a remarkable 17 tries. Norgren also scored 13 points for Auckland Pākehā against Auckland Māori in their 19-16 win. He also scored a try in the North Island's 18-8 win over the South Island on October 6, 1945. Nordgren was a champion sprinter and held the New Zealand junior 100 yard and 220 yard records.

Along with Ces Mountford he sensationally signed with Wigan in December 1945, catching the New Zealand Rugby League unawares as they had not realised a 1937 international transfer ban had lapsed in 1941.

Nordgren made his début for Wigan against Warrington on 3 April 1946 and went on to play in nine matches that season. During his time at Wigan he was the top try scorer in the 1949-50 season, with 57 tries, and played in two Challenge Cup finals in 1946 and 1951. Wigan lost to Wakefield Trinity in 1946 after Nordgren missed a long-range penalty goal, estimated by Nordgren to be about 54m. The team won the Challenge Cup in 1951, defeating Barrow.

He represented Other Nationalities against France in 1951 and retired in 1955, having played in 293 games and scored 1154 points from 312 tries and 109 goals.

=== County Cup Final appearances ===
Brian Nordgren played on the wing in Wigan's 9-3 victory over Belle Vue Rangers in the 1946–47 Lancashire Cup Final during the 1946–47 season at Station Road, Swinton on Saturday 26 October 1946, played on the wing, and scored a try in the 10-7 victory over Belle Vue Rangers in the 1947–48 Lancashire Cup Final during the 1947–48 season at Wilderspool Stadium, Warrington on Saturday 1 November 1947, played on the wing in the 14-8 victory over Warrington in the 1948–49 Lancashire Cup Final during the 1948–49 season at Station Road, Swinton on Saturday 13 November 1948, played on the wing, and scored four tries in the 20-7 victory over Leigh in the 1949–50 Lancashire Cup Final during the 1949–50 season at Wilderspool Stadium, Warrington on Saturday 29 October 1949, played on the wing, and scored two tries in the 28-5 victory over Warrington in the 1950–51 Lancashire Cup Final during the 1950–51 season at Station Road, Swinton on Saturday 4 November 1950, played on the wing, and scored two tries in the 14-6 victory over Leigh in the 1951–52 Lancashire Cup Final during the 1951–52 season at Station Road, Swinton on Saturday 27 October 1951, and played on the wing in the 8-16 defeat by St. Helens in the 1953–54 Lancashire Cup Final during the 1953–54 season at Station Road, Swinton on Saturday 24 October 1953.

== Later years ==
Nordgren studied law at the University of Liverpool and was called to the bar in 1951. After retirement he returned to New Zealand and practiced law in Auckland and Hamilton. He also spent some time coaching Ponsonby.
