= Les White (rugby league, born 1920) =

GB & England international rugby league footballer

Personal information
- Full name: Leslie White
- Born: 1920
- Died: 1993 (aged 73) York, England

Playing information
- Position: Prop, Second-row
Club
Years	Team	Pld	T	G	FG	P
≤1946–47	York
1947–49	Wigan	67	29	0	0	78
1949–53	Halifax	120	30	0	0	90
	Total	187	59	0	0	168
Representative
Years	Team	Pld	T	G	FG	P
1942	Northern Command XIII	0	0	0	0	0
	Yorkshire
1946–51	England	10	4	0	0	13
1946–47	Great Britain	6	0	0	0	0

Leslie White (1920 – 1993) was an English professional rugby league footballer who played in the 1940s and 1950s. He played at representative level for Great Britain, England and Yorkshire, and at club level for York, Wigan, and Halifax, as a prop, or second-row. White was also a gunner in the British Army during World War II.

== Playing career ==
=== Club career ===
White was transferred from York to Wigan, he made his dêbut for Wigan in the 39–5 victory over Liverpool Stanley at Central Park, Wigan on Saturday 23 August 1947, also scoring a try.

White played left-second-row in Wigan's 8–3 victory over Bradford Northern in the 1948 Challenge Cup Final during the 1947–48 season at Wembley Stadium, London on Saturday 1 May 1948, in front of a crowd of 91,465.

White played left-second-row in Wigan's 10–7 victory over Belle Vue Rangers in the 1947 Lancashire Cup Final during the 1947–48 season at Wilderspool Stadium, Warrington on Saturday 1 November 1947.

He scored his last try for Wigan in the 26–7 victory over Warrington at Central Park, Wigan on 9 April 1949, he played his last match for Wigan in the 29–18 victory over Batley at Mount Pleasant, Batley on 20 August 1949, he was transferred from Wigan to Halifax.

He announced his retirement due to injury in October 1953. He died in 1993, aged 73.

=== Representative honours ===
Les White won caps for England while at York in 1946 against France (2 matches), and Wales (2 matches), in 1947 against France (2 matches), and Wales, while at Wigan in 1947 against Wales, in 1948 against France, and while at Halifax in 1951 against Wales, and won caps for Great Britain while at York in 1946 against Australia (3 matches), and New Zealand, and while at Wigan in 1947 against New Zealand (2 matches).

Les White played right-prop for Northern Command XIII against a Rugby League XIII at Thrum Hall, Halifax on Saturday 21 March 1942. Coincidentally, he played alongside another Les White.
