= Joe Egan (rugby league) =

Former Great Britain and England international rugby league footballer

Personal information
- Full name: Joseph Egan
- Born: 26 March 1919 Wigan, England
- Died: 11 November 2012 (aged 93) Wigan, England

Playing information
- Position: Hooker
Club
Years	Team	Pld	T	G	FG	P
1938–50	Wigan	362	24	11	0	94
1943	→ Oldham (guest)	1	0	0	0	0
1950–55	Leigh	104
	Total	467	24	11	0	94
Representative
Years	Team	Pld	T	G	FG	P
1943–50	England	21	1	0	0	3
1946–50	Great Britain	14	0	0	0	0
1945–50	Lancashire	10

Coaching information
Club
Years	Team	Gms	W	D	L	W%
1950–56	Leigh
1956–61	Wigan
≤1964–≥64	Widnes
1968–70	Warrington
	Blackpool Borough
	Total	0	0	0	0

Joseph Egan (26 March 1919 – 11 November 2012) was an English professional rugby league footballer who played in the 1930s, 1940s and 1950s, and coached in the 1950s, 1960s and 1970s. He played at representative level for Great Britain (vice-captain 1950 Great Britain Lions tour) and England and Lancashire, and at club level for Wigan from 1938 to 1950, Oldham (World War II guest) and Leigh, as a hooker, or second-row, and coached at club level for Leigh, Wigan, Widnes, Warrington and Blackpool Borough. Egan is a Wigan Hall of Fame inductee, and was a life member at Wigan, Egan later became coach of Wigan, taking them to Championship success in the 1959–60 season.

== Background ==
Joe Egan was born in Wigan, Lancashire, England, and he died aged 93 in Wigan, Greater Manchester, England.

== Playing career ==
=== Wigan ===
During the 1938–39 season Joe Egan played at hooker in Wigan's 10–7 victory over Salford in the 1938–39 Lancashire Cup Final at Station Road, Swinton on Saturday 22 October 1938.

Egan played hooker for a Rugby League XIII against Northern Command XIII at Thrum Hall, Halifax on Saturday 21 March 1942. During the 1943–44 season Egan played hooker, and scored a drop goal in Wigan's 13–9 victory over Dewsbury in the Championship Final first-leg at Central Park, Wigan on Saturday 13 May 1944, and played hooker, and scored a try in the 12–5 victory over Dewsbury in the Championship Final second-leg at Crown Flatt, Dewsbury on Saturday 20 May 1944.

During the 1945–46 season Egan played at hooker in the 3–7 defeat by Widnes in the 1945–46 Lancashire Cup Final at Wilderspool Stadium, Warrington on Saturday 27 October 1945. He also won two Championships with Wigan in the 1945–46 season, and the 1946–47 season. During the 1946–47 season he played hooker in the 9–3 victory over Belle Vue Rangers in the 1946–47 Lancashire Cup Final at Station Road, Swinton on Saturday 26 October 1946. During the 1947–48 season he played hooker in the 10–7 victory over Belle Vue Rangers in the 1947–48 Lancashire Cup Final at Wilderspool Stadium, Warrington on Saturday 1 November 1947. During the 1947–48 season Egan played hooker and was captain in Wigan's 8–3 victory over Bradford Northern in the 1947–48 Challenge Cup Final at Wembley Stadium, London on Saturday 1 May 1948, in front of a crowd of 91,465. He was the first captain to receive the trophy from a reigning monarch, King George VI. On the same day former prop with Egan on the indomitables tour Frank Whitcombe of Bradford Northern, was the first man to win the Lance Todd trophy on the losing side. During the 1948–49 season Egan played at hooker in the 14–8 victory over Warrington in the 1948–49 Lancashire Cup Final at Station Road, Swinton on Saturday 13 November 1948, and during the 1949–50 season he played at hooker in the 20–7 victory over Leigh in the 1949–50 Lancashire Cup Final at Station Road, Swinton on Saturday 29 October 1949.

=== Oldham ===
Joe Egan played as a hooker as a World War II guest in Oldham's 8–11 defeat by Bradford Northern in the 1942–43 match at Odsal Stadium, Bradford on Saturday 16 January 1943.

=== Leigh ===
During the 1951–52 season Egan played hooker and was the coach in Leigh's 6–14 defeat by Wigan in the 1951–52 Lancashire Cup Final at Station Road, Swinton on Saturday 27 October 1951, in front of a crowd of 33,230. During the 1952–53 season he played hooker and was the coach in the 22–5 victory over St. Helens in the 1952–53 Lancashire Cup Final at Station Road, Swinton on Saturday 29 November 1952, in front of a crowd of 34,785.

=== International ===
He accompanied the Great Britain test team as hooker on their tour of Australia in 1946 and 1948. Joe Egan, Frank Whitcombe & Ken Gee formed a formidable front row in the first two test which the Australians feared on the tour to Australia in 1946. He was the last survivor of the 1946 touring team.

== Coaching career ==
=== Leigh ===
Egan remained with Leigh purely as coach for the season after he had retired from playing, and finished 11th in his last season with Leigh. During the 1955–56 season Egan was the coach in Leigh's 26–9 victory over Widnes in the 1955–56 Lancashire Cup Final at Central Park, Wigan on Saturday 15 October 1955, in front of a crowd of 26,504.

=== Wigan ===
During the 1957–58 season Egan was the coach in Wigan's 13–9 victory over Workington Town in the 1957–58 Challenge Cup Final at Wembley Stadium, London on Saturday 10 May 1958, in front of a crowd of 66,109. During the 1958–59 season he was the coach in the 30–13 victory over Hull F.C. in the 1958–59 Challenge Cup Final at Wembley Stadium, London on Saturday 9 May 1959, in front of a crowd of 79,811, During the 1960–61 season Egan was coach in the 6–12 defeat by St. Helens in the 1960–61 Challenge Cup Final at Wembley Stadium, London on Saturday 13 May 1961, in front of a crowd of 94,672.

=== Warrington ===
Egan later coached Warrington. During the 1967–68 season Egan was the coach in Warrington's 2–2 draw with St. Helens in the 1967–68 Lancashire Cup Final at Central Park, Wigan on Saturday 7 October 1967, and the 10–13 defeat by St. Helens in the 1967–68 Lancashire Cup Final replay at Station Road, Swinton on Saturday 2 December 1967. After a disastrous start to the 1970–71 season, Joe Egan decided to stand down, and he was replaced by Peter Harvey.

Sporting positions
Achievements
Preceded by Albert Naughton	Rugby league transfer record Wigan to Leigh; 1950–1952	Succeeded by Lewis Jones
