= Charlie Pollard =

English international rugby league player (1897–1968)

Personal information
- Full name: Charles Arthur Pollard
- Born: c. 1897 Wakefield, England
- Died: 1 October 1968 (aged 71) Wakefield, England

Playing information
- Height: 5 ft 9 in (175 cm)
- Weight: 11 st 8 lb (73 kg)
- Position: Fullback, Wing, Centre
Club
Years	Team	Pld	T	G	FG	P
1919–32	Wakefield Trinity	385	39	654	0	1425
Representative
Years	Team	Pld	T	G	FG	P
	Yorkshire
1924	Great Britain	1	0	0	0	0

Coaching information
Club
Years	Team	Gms	W	D	L	W%
1935–39	Batley
- Relatives: Roy Pollard (son); Ernest Pollard (brother)

Charles "Charlie" Arthur Pollard (c. 1897 – 1 October 1968) was an English professional rugby league footballer who played in the 1910s, 1920s and 1930s, and coached in the 1930s. He played at representative level for Great Britain and Yorkshire, and at club level for Wakefield Trinity (captain), as a fullback, wing, or centre, and coached at club level for Batley.

== Background ==
Charlie Pollard was born in Wakefield, West Riding of Yorkshire, England, and he died aged 71 in Wakefield, West Riding of Yorkshire, England.

== Playing career ==
=== Club career ===
Charlie Pollard made his début for Wakefield Trinity during August 1919, he played his last match for Wakefield Trinity during December 1932.

Charlie Pollard played fullback in Wakefield Trinity's 3–29 defeat by Australia in the 1921–22 Kangaroo tour of Great Britain match at Belle Vue, Wakefield on Saturday 22 October 1921.

Charlie Pollard played right wing in Wakefield Trinity's 9–8 victory over Batley in the 1924–25 Yorkshire Cup Final during the 1924–25 season at Headingley, Leeds on Saturday 22 November 1924, and played left wing in the 3–10 defeat by Huddersfield in the 1926–27 Yorkshire Cup Final during the 1926–27 season at Headingley, Leeds on Wednesday 1 December 1926, the original match on Saturday 27 November 1926 was postponed due to fog.

Charlie Pollard's Testimonial match for Wakefield Trinity was the 8–7 victory over Leeds at Belle Vue, Wakefield on Saturday 19 March 1927.

=== Representative honours ===
Charlie Pollard won a cap for Great Britain while at Wakefield Trinity, he played fullback in Great Britain's 11–13 defeat by New Zealand in the 2nd test match at Basin Reserve, Wellington on Wednesday 6 August 1924.

Charlie Pollard won cap(s) for Yorkshire while at Wakefield Trinity.

== Coaching career ==
=== Club career ===
Charlie Pollard was the coach of Batley from July 1935 to March 1939.

== Personal life ==
Charlie Pollard's marriage to Nora Gwendoline (née Brownhill) was registered during second ¼ 1926 in Wakefield district. They had 3 children; the rugby league footballer Roy Pollard, Oxford University RFC, Wakefield RFC, Colwyn Bay RFC and North Wales rugby (captain) rugby union footballer David, and Barbara. Charlie had two younger brothers who also played rugby league; Ernest Pollard, who played at fullback for Wakefield Trinity, and Don Pollard, who played for Leeds and Batley.

== Outside rugby league ==
Charlie Pollard was the Landlord of the Graziers' Hotel, Belle Vue, Wakefield c. 1920.
