= Phil Coles =

Australian canoeist and sports administrator (1931–2023)

Phillip Walter Coles AM (20 July 1931 – 28 January 2023) was an Australian sports administrator and canoe sprinter. Competing at the 1960 Rome, 1964 Tokyo, and 1968 Mexico City Olympics, he earned his best finish of ninth in the K-4 1000 m event at the Tokyo games, where he was also the team captain.

Coles was a member of the International Olympic Committee from 1982 to 2011 and became an honorary member of that organisation in 2012 after reaching the retirement age of 80. He was the Australian Olympic Committee Secretary General from 1985 to 1993 and Director of International Relations from 1993 to 1999. He was a member of the executive board of the Australian Olympic Committee from 1973 to 2011, and was a founding member of the Oceania National Olympic Committees. He also served on the boards of other sporting organisations including Secretary General of the International Triathlon Union from 1994 to 1999 and inaugural Chair of the New South Wales Institute of Sport from 1995 to 2015.

Coles was forced to stand down from the Sydney 2000 Olympic Games Organising Committee due to being one of twenty four IOC members implicated in the Salt Lake City 2002 bidding bribery controversy. Coles was sanctioned by the IOC as he received lavish hospitality from the bid committee.

Coles was appointed a Member of the Order of Australia in the 1983 Queen's Birthday Honours "for service to sport", was inducted into the Sport Australia Hall of Fame in 1993, and received an Australian Sports Medal in 2000. In 2012, Coles received the IOC Olympic Order for his distinguished contribution to the Olympic Movement.

On his death, IOC President Thomas Bach remarked ""He was key to getting an Australian Olympic team to the Olympic Games Moscow 1980 against all requests for a boycott. It made him proud for the rest of his life to have led these athletes into the Olympic Stadium. His love for the Olympic Games was at the centre of his life." Former AOC President John Coates stated "The athletes of Australia have lost one of their true champions and the AOC one of its strongest leaders. It was Phil who was key to our participation in Moscow 1980 and notwithstanding intense personal and public abuse. It was this participation by the Australian Olympic Team against the wishes of the then Prime Minister and Australian Government that once and for all emphasized the independence of the Australian Olympic Committee."
