= Jim Featherstone =

Great Britain and England international rugby league footballer

Personal information
- Full name: James Joseph Featherstone
- Born: 25 February 1923 Wigan district, England
- Died: 6 May 2014 (aged 91) Wigan, Greater Manchester, England

Playing information
- Height: 5 ft 11 in (1.80 m)
- Weight: 14 st 0 lb (89 kg)
- Position: Prop, Second-row, Loose forward
Club
Years	Team	Pld	T	G	FG	P
1943–46	Wigan	58	9	0	0	27
1946–53	Warrington	240	47	2	1	147
1953–54	Belle Vue Rangers	22	5	0	0	15
1954–55	Wigan	39	4	0	0	12
1955–56	Rochdale Hornets	20	3	0	0	9
	Total	379	68	2	1	210
Representative
Years	Team	Pld	T	G	FG	P
1948–52	Lancashire	6	1	0	0	3
1948–52	England	8	0	0	0	0
1948–52	Great Britain	6	1		0	3

James Joseph Featherstone (25 February 1923 – 6 May 2014) was an English professional rugby league footballer who played in the 1940s and 1950s. He played at representative level for Great Britain, England and Lancashire, and at club level for Ince Rangers ARLFC (in Ince-in-Makerfield), Wigan (two spells), Warrington, Belle Vue Rangers and Rochdale Hornets, as a prop, second-row, or loose forward.

== Background ==
Featherstone's birth was registered in Wigan district, Lancashire, England, he worked as a coal miner, steam locomotive stoker (including for the Flying Scotsman), and he died aged 91 in Wigan, Greater Manchester, England.

== Playing career ==
=== Club career ===
Featherstone made his début for Wigan in the 19–11 victory over Hunslet at Parkside, Hunslet on Saturday 20 November 1943. He scored his first try for Wigan in the 3–0 victory over Bradford Northern in the 1943–44 Challenge Cup Final 1st Leg at Central Park, Wigan on Thursday 15 April 1943, he scored his last try for Wigan (in his second spell) in the 29–2 victory over Swinton at Central Park, Wigan on Saturday 5 March 1955, he played his last match for Wigan (in his second spell) in the 6–13 defeat by Featherstone Rovers at Post Office Road, Featherstone on Saturday 17 September 1955, he made his début for Warrington on Saturday 5 January 1946, and he played his last match for Warrington on Saturday 21 February 1953.

=== Championship final appearances ===
Featherstone played at second-row and scored a try in Wigan's 13–9 victory over Dewsbury in the Championship Final first-leg during the 1943–44 season at Central Park, Wigan on Saturday 13 May 1944, played at second-row in the 12–5 victory over Dewsbury in the Championship Final second-leg during the 1943–44 season at Crown Flatt, Dewsbury on Saturday 20 May 1944. and played at second-row in Warrington's 15–5 victory over Bradford Northern in the Championship Final during the 1947–48 season at Maine Road, Manchester.

=== County Cup Final appearances ===
Featherstone played at second-row in Warrington's 8–14 defeat by Wigan in the 1948–49 Lancashire Cup Final during the 1948–49 season at Station Road, Swinton on Saturday 13 November 1948, and played at prop in the 5–28 defeat by Wigan in the 1950–51 Lancashire Cup Final during the 1949–50 season at Station Road, Swinton on Saturday 4 November 1950.

=== International honours ===
Featherstone won caps for England while at Warrington in 1948 against France, in 1949 against Wales, France (2 matches), and Other Nationalities, in 1950 against Wales (2 matches), in 1952 against Wales, and won caps for Great Britain while at Warrington in 1948 against Australia, on the 1950 Great Britain Lions tour against New Zealand (2 matches), and in 1952 against Australia (3 matches).

== Honoured at Warrington Wolves ==
Jim Featherstone is a Warrington Wolves Hall of Fame inductee.

== Personal life ==
Jim Featherstone married Lillian, with whom he had one son, Ian. Lillian died when Ian was 5 years old. He remarried to Elizabeth, who would be his wife for the next 56 years.
