= 1946–47 Lancashire Cup =

- Structure: Regional knockout championship
- Teams: 13
- Winners: Wigan
- Runners-up: Belle Vue Rangers

The 1946–47 Lancashire Cup was the thirty-fourth occasion on which the Lancashire Cup competition had been held.

Wigan won the trophy by beating Belle Vue Rangers by the score of 9–3.

The match was played at Station Road, Pendlebury, (historically in the county of Lancashire). The attendance was 21,648 and receipts were £2,658.

Although it could not have been known at this time, this was to be the first of Wigan's record breaking run of six consecutive Lancashire Cup victories.

It was also to be the first of two consecutive finals to be competed for by these two teams.

== Background ==
The number of teams entering showed little change from before the war.

Leigh returned to the sport using a rented athletic stadium while their purpose built stadium was under construction.

Overall, the number of teams entering this year's competition increased by one with the return of Leigh bringing the total up to 13.

The same pre-war fixture format was retained. This season saw one bye and one "blank" or "dummy" fixture in the first round. The second round also had one bye, but now no "blank" fixture".

As last season, all the first round ties of the competition was played on the basis of two legged, home and away, ties. In addition, this season, the second round was also on a two leg, home and away basis.

== Competition and results ==
=== Round 1 ===
Involved 6 matches (with one bye and one "blank" fixture) and 13 clubs

Game No	Fixture date	Home team	Score	Away team	Venue	agg	Att	Rec	Notes	Ref
1	Sat 07 Sep 1946	Liverpool Stanley	0–7	Belle Vue Rangers	Stanley Greyhound Stadium					
2	Sat 07 Sep 1946	St. Helens	5–14	Leigh	Knowsley Road		10,000			
3	Sat 07 Sep 1946	Salford	10–3	Warrington	The Willows					
4	Sat 07 Sep 1946	Widnes	26–5	Barrow	Naughton Park					
5	Sat 07 Sep 1946	Wigan	49–4	Rochdale Hornets	Central Park					
6	Sat 07 Sep 1946	Workington Town	2–8	Oldham	Borough Park					
7		Swinton		bye						
8		blank		blank						

=== Round 1 – second leg ===
Involved 6 matches (with two "blank" fixture) and 12 clubs. These are the reverse fixture from the first leg

Game No	Fixture date	Home team	Score	Away team	Venue	agg	Att	Rec	Notes	Ref
1	Sat 14 Sep 1946	Belle Vue Rangers	11–5	Liverpool Stanley	Belle Vue Stadium	18–5				
2	Sat 14 Sep 1946	Leigh	17–4	St. Helens	Madeley Park	31–9	9,200			
3	Sat 14 Sep 1946	Warrington	10–5	Salford	Wilderspool	13–15				
4	Sat 14 Sep 1946	Barrow	10–3	Widnes	Craven Park	15–29				
5	Sat 14 Sep 1946	Rochdale Hornets	5–32	Wigan	Athletic Grounds	9–81				
6	Sat 14 Sep 1946	Oldham	19–10	Workington Town	Watersheddings	27–12				
7		Swinton		bye						
8		blank		blank						

=== Round 2 – quarterfinals – first leg ===
Involved 3 matches (with one bye) and 7 clubs

Game No	Fixture date	Home team	Score	Away team	Venue	agg	Att	Rec	Notes	Ref
1	Tue 24 Sep 1946	Oldham	20–8	Leigh	Watersheddings					
2	Wed 25 Sep 1946	Swinton	6–8	Widnes	Station Road					
3	Wed 25 Sep 1946	Wigan	31–0	Salford	Central Park					
4		Belle Vue Rangers		bye						

=== Round 2 – quarterfinals – second leg ===
Involved 3 matches (with one bye) and 7 clubs. These are the reverse fixture from the first leg

Game No	Fixture date	Home team	Score	Away team	Venue	agg	Att	Rec	Notes	Ref
1	Wed 02 Oct 1946	Leigh	6–11	Oldham	Madeley Park	14–31				
2	Thu 03 Oct 1946	Widnes	9–2	Swinton	Naughton Park	17–8				
2	Wed 02 Oct 1946	Salford	0–19	Wigan	The Willows	0–50				
3		Belle Vue Rangers		bye						

=== Round 3 – semifinals ===
Involved 2 matches and 4 clubs

Game No	Fixture date	Home team	Score	Away team	Venue	agg	Att	Rec	Notes	Ref
1	Tue 15 Oct 1946	Oldham	7–21	Wigan	Watersheddings					
2	Wed 16 Oct 1946	Belle Vue Rangers	5–0	Widnes	Belle Vue Stadium					

=== Final ===
Game No	Fixture date	Home team	Score	Away team	Venue	agg	Att	Rec	Notes	Ref
	Saturday 26 October 1946	Wigan	9–3	Belle Vue Rangers	Station Road		21,648	£2,658	4	

==== Teams and scorers ====
Wigan	№	Belle Vue Rangers
	teams	
Martin Ryan	1	A. Harris
Brian Nordgren	2	T. Tolan
Johnny Lawrenson	3	J. Waring
Ernie Ashcroft	4	Stanley Powell
Gordon Ratcliffe	5	T. Barr
Ced Mountford	6	T. Kenny
Tommy Bradshaw	7	Billy Watkins
Ken Gee	8	D. Thomas
Joe Egan	9	Glyn Jones
George Banks	10	A. Glendenning
Harry Atkinson	11	Elwyn Gwyther
Billy Blan	12	W. Brown
Jack Blan	13	Dick Manning
9	score	3
7	HT	3
	Scorers	
	Tries	
Jack Blan (1)	T	Dick Manning (1)
	Goals	
Johnny Lawrenson (3)	G	
Referee		Albert Dobson (Pontefract)

Scoring – Try = three (3) points – Goal = two (2) points – Drop goal = two (2) points

=== The road to success ===
All the first and second round ties were played on a two leg (home and away) basis.

The first club named in each of the first and second round ties played the first leg at home.

the scores shown in the first and second round are the aggregate score over the two legs.

First round
Workington Town	12
Oldham	27
St. Helens	9
Leigh	31
Wigan	81
Rochdale Hornets	9
Salford	15
Warrington	13
Liverpool Stanley	5
Belle Vue Rangers	18
blank
blank
Widnes	29
Barrow	15
Swinton
bye

Second round
Oldham	31
Leigh	14
Wigan	50
Salford	0
Belle Vue Rangers
bye
Widnes	8
Swinton	17

Semifinals
Oldham	7
Wigan	21
Belle Vue Rangers	5
Widnes	0

Final
Wigan	9
Belle Vue Rangers	3

== Notes and comments ==
1. The first Lancashire Cup match played by the newly name club
2. Leigh's belated return to the sport after the war years
3. The first Lancashire Cup match to be played at Leigh's temporary home
4. Station Road was the home ground of Swinton from 1929 to 1932 and at its peak was one of the finest rugby league grounds in the country and it boasted a capacity of 60,000. The actual record attendance was for the Challenge Cup semi-final on 7 April 1951 when 44,621 watched Wigan beat Warrington 3–2

== See also ==
- 1946–47 Northern Rugby Football League season
- Rugby league county cups
