= Ken Gee =

Great Britain and England international rugby league footballer

Personal information
- Full name: Kenneth Gee
- Born: 23 September 1916 Wigan, Lancashire, England
- Died: 17 April 1989 (aged 72)

Playing information
- Height: 5 ft 9 in (175 cm)
- Position: Prop
Club
Years	Team	Pld	T	G	FG	P
1935–54	Wigan	559	54	508		1178
1943(guest)	→ Oldham	1	0	0		0
	Total	560	54	508	0	1178
Representative
Years	Team	Pld	T	G	FG	P
1942–51	Lancashire	12	0	6	0	12
1943–51	England	20	1	8	0	19
1946–51	Great Britain	17	1	3	0	9
- Relatives: Sam Gee (grandson); Samuel Gee (uncle)

Kenneth Gee (23 September 1916 – 17 April 1989) was an English rugby league footballer who played in the 1930s, 1940s and 1950s. He played at representative level for Great Britain winning 17 caps between 1946 and 1951, England winning 18-caps between 1943 and 1951, and Lancashire, and at club level for Wigan and Oldham (World War II guest), as a prop. He is an inductee of the Wigan Hall of Fame, having featured in Wigan's Rugby Football League Championship wins of 1945–46, 1946–47 and 1949–50 as well as their Challenge Cup victories of 1948 and 1951. He also won Lancashire Cup winner's medals seven times.

== Background ==
Gee was born in Wigan, Lancashire, England, and he died aged 72. Gee was the nephew of the rugby league footballer; Samuel Gee, and he was the grandfather of the rugby league footballer; Sam Gee.

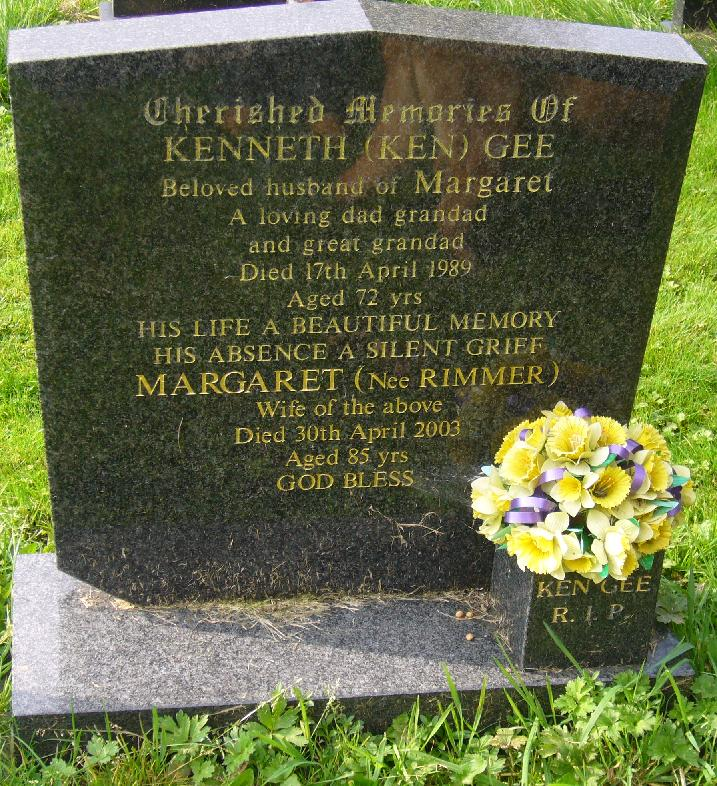
Ken Gee's headstone

== Career ==
Signing with his home town club Wigan in 1933, Ken Gee played at prop in Wigan's 10–7 victory over Salford in the 1938–39 Lancashire Cup Final during the 1938–39 season at Station Road, Swinton on Saturday 22 October 1938. Gee played Tighthead-Prop for a Rugby League XIII against Northern Command XIII at Thrum Hall, Halifax on Saturday 21 March 1942.

Gee played at prop and scored a try in Wigan's 13–9 victory over Dewsbury in the Championship Final first-leg during the 1943–44 season at Central Park, Wigan on Saturday 13 May 1944, and played at prop in the 12–5 victory over Dewsbury in the Championship Final second-leg during the 1943–44 season at Crown Flatt, Dewsbury on Saturday 20 May 1944.

During the 1945–46 season Gee played at prop in Wigan's 3–7 loss to Widnes in the 1945–46 Lancashire Cup Final at Wilderspool Stadium, Warrington on Saturday 27 October 1945. During the 1946–47 season Gee played at prop in Wigan's 9–3 victory over Belle Vue Rangers in the 1946–47 Lancashire Cup Final at Station Road, Swinton on Saturday 26 October 1946. During the 1947–48 season Gee played at prop in the 10–7 victory over Belle Vue Rangers in the 1947–48 Lancashire Cup Final at Wilderspool Stadium, Warrington on Saturday 1 November 1947. During the 1948–49 season he played in the 14–8 victory over Warrington in the 1948–49 Lancashire Cup Final at Station Road, Swinton on Saturday 13 November 1948,

Ken Gee played at prop in Wigan's 8–3 victory over Bradford Northern in the 1947–48 Challenge Cup Final during the 1947–48 season at Wembley Stadium, London on Saturday 1 May 1948, in front of a crowd of 91,465.

During the 1949–50 season Gee played at prop, and scored a goal in the 20–7 victory over Leigh in the 1949–50 Lancashire Cup Final at Wilderspool Stadium, Warrington on Saturday 29 October 1949. He played at prop and scored 5-goals in the 28–5 victory over Warrington in the 1950–51 Lancashire Cup Final during the 1950–51 season at Station Road, Swinton on Saturday 4 November 1950, played at prop and scored a goal in the 14–6 victory over Leigh in the 1951–52 Lancashire Cup Final during the 1951–52 season at Station Road, Swinton on Saturday 27 October 1951, and played at prop and scored a goal in the 8–16 defeat by St. Helens in the 1953–54 Lancashire Cup Final during the 1953–54 season at Station Road, Swinton on Saturday 24 October 1953.

Gee joined Wigan teammate Joe Egan on tours down under in 1946 and 1950, playing in all nine matches of three consecutive Ashes series matches against Australia. On the famous unbeaten tour of 1946 to Australia, the "Indomitables" tour, the front row in the first two tests of Frank Whitcombe, Joe Egan, and Ken Gee laid the foundation for this Ashes win. Gee amassed a total of 559 games for Wigan, second only to Jim Sullivan. He also kicked 508 goals.

In recognition of Gee, an amateur rugby competition in Wigan called "Ken Gee Cup" was formed. Gee died 17 April 1989 (aged 72) and was buried at St Matthew's Church at Highfield, Wigan.
