= Gordon Ratcliffe =

Great Britain and England international rugby league footballer

Personal information
- Full name: Gordon W. Ratcliffe
- Born: 24 August 1925
- Died: 27 August 1981 (aged 56)

Playing information
- Position: Wing, Centre
Club
Years	Team	Pld	T	G	FG	P
1945–53	Wigan	210	184	0	0	552
1954–54	St Helens	22	12	0	0	36
	Total	232	196	0	0	588
Representative
Years	Team	Pld	T	G	FG	P
1947–51	England	4	3	0	0	9
1947–50	Great Britain	3	0	0	0	0

Gordon W. Ratcliffe (24 August 1925 – 27 August 1981) was an English professional rugby league footballer who played in the 1940s and 1950s. He played at representative level for Great Britain and England, and at club level for Wigan and later arch-rivals St Helens, as a wing, or centre.

== Playing career ==
=== International honours ===
Ratcliffe won caps for England while at Wigan in 1947 against Wales, in 1948 and 1949 against France, and in 1951 against Other Nationalities.

He also played for Great Britain while at Wigan in 1947 against New Zealand, and in 2 matches in 1950 against Australia.

=== Championship final appearances ===
Ratcliffe played at centre in Wigan's 13–4 victory over Huddersfield in the Championship Final during the 1945–46 season at Maine Road, Manchester on Saturday 18 May 1946.

=== Challenge Cup Final appearances ===
Ratcliffe played on the wing in Wigan's 8-3 victory over Bradford Northern in the 1947–48 Challenge Cup Final during the 1947–48 season at Wembley Stadium, London on Saturday 1 May 1948, in front of a crowd of 91,465.

=== County Cup Final appearances ===
Ratcliffe played on the wing and scored a try in Wigan's 3-7 defeat by Widnes in the 1945–46 Lancashire Cup Final during the 1945–46 season at Wilderspool Stadium, Warrington on Saturday 27 October 1945, played on the wing in the 9-3 victory over Belle Vue Rangers in the 1946–47 Lancashire Cup Final during the 1946–47 season at Station Road, Swinton, on Saturday 26 October 1946, played right-wing, and scored a try in the 10-7 victory over Belle Vue Rangers in the 1947–48 Lancashire Cup Final during the 1947–48 season at Wilderspool Stadium, on Saturday 1 November 1947, played right-wing, and scored a try in the 14-8 victory over Warrington in the 1948–49 Lancashire Cup Final during the 1948–49 season at Station Road, Swinton, on Saturday 13 November 1948, played right-wing in the 28-5 victory over Warrington in the 1950–51 Lancashire Cup Final during the 1950–51 season at Station Road, Swinton on Saturday 4 November 1950. and played right-wing in the 14-6 victory over Leigh in the 1951–52 Lancashire Cup Final during the 1951–52 season at Station Road, on Saturday 27 October 1951.
