= Ron Stanton =

Australian rugby league footballer

Personal information
- Full name: Ronald Stanley Stanton
- Born: 25 December 1928 Brisbane, Queensland, Australia
- Died: 9 May 2012 (aged 83) Brisbane, Queensland, Australia

Playing information
- Position: Halfback
Club
Years	Team	Pld	T	G	FG	P
1952	St. George Dragons	10	0	4	0	8
Representative
Years	Team	Pld	T	G	FG	P
1950	Queensland	1	1	0	0	3
1951	Brisbane

Ron Stanton (1928−2012) was an Australian professional rugby league footballer who played in the 1950s. A Queensland representative halfback and a key member of the Brisbane Rugby League premiership-winning Eastern Suburbs side of 1950, he joined the New South Wales Rugby Football League's St. George club for one year in 1952. Towards the end of the season, Stanton suffered a career-ending leg injury and retired from playing. In 1953, he returned to Brisbane to coach the Souths Club at Gordonvale, Queensland.
