= Jack Rooney =

Australian rugby league player

Personal information
- Full name: John Joseph Rooney
- Born: 26 July 1924
- Died: 1 December 2000 (aged 76)

Playing information
- Position: Front-row
Representative
Years	Team	Pld	T	G	FG	P
1948–54	Queensland	15	2	0	0	6
1952	Australia	2	0	0	0	0

John Joseph Rooney (26 July 1924 – 1 December 2000) was an Australian rugby league player.

A police constable, Rooney played prop for Queensland from 1948 to 1954 and competed with Brisbane club Brothers, before transferring to Toowoomba for work in 1951.

Rooney was called up from the Toowoomba All Whites to the Australian squad in 1952 for a home series against New Zealand. He packed the Kangaroos front-row for the 1st Test and 3rd Test matches, both in Sydney.
