= Roy Pollard =

GB & England international rugby league footballer

Personal information
- Full name: Roy Pollard
- Born: 27 August 1927 Wakefield district, England
- Died: 30 October 2012 (aged 85) Wakefield, West Yorkshire, England

Playing information

Rugby union
Club
Years	Team	Pld	T	G	FG	P
19??–??	Wakefield RFC
19??–48	Huddersfield RUFC
	Total	0	0	0	0	0

Rugby league
- Position: Wing
Club
Years	Team	Pld	T	G	FG	P
1948–≥50	Dewsbury
Representative
Years	Team	Pld	T	G	FG	P
1949–50	England	2	0	0	0	0
1950	Great Britain	1	1	0	0	3
- Father: Charlie Pollard
- Relatives: Ernest Pollard (uncle)

Roy Pollard (27 August 1927 – 30 October 2012) was an English professional rugby league footballer who played in the 1940s and 1950s. He played at representative level for Great Britain and England, and at club level for Dewsbury, as a wing.

== Background ==
Roy Pollard's birth was registered in Wakefield district, West Riding of Yorkshire, England, and he died aged 85 in Wakefield, West Yorkshire, England.

== Rugby league career ==
=== Club career ===
Pollard played rugby union for Wakefield and Huddersfield before signing for rugby league club Dewsbury in 1948.

=== International honours ===
Roy Pollard won caps for England while at Dewsbury in 1949 against France, and in 1950 against Wales, and won a cap for Great Britain while at Dewsbury in 1950 against New Zealand.

== Personal life ==
Roy Pollard was the son of the rugby league footballer; Charles Pollard; the nephew of the rugby league footballer; Ernest Pollard; and the cousin of the Wakefield RFC player of 1956 to 1958, Anthony Pollard. Roy's brother, David, crossed codes to play rugby union. A member of the first post-war sports tour to Japan with Oxford University in 1951, he scored the only try of the 1952 varsity match, and went on to captain North Wales.
