= Tom Danby =

English dual-code rugby footballer (1926–2022)

Personal information
- Full name: Thompson Danby
- Born: 10 August 1926 Trimdon district, County Durham, England
- Died: 26 December 2022 (aged 96)

Playing information

Rugby union
- Position: Wing
Club
Years	Team	Pld	T	G	FG	P
≤1949–49	Harlequin F.C.
Representative
Years	Team	Pld	T	G	FG	P
1949	England	1	0	0	0	0

Rugby league
- Position: Wing
Club
Years	Team	Pld	T	G	FG	P
1949–54	Salford	174	61	2		187
Representative
Years	Team	Pld	T	G	FG	P
1950	England	3	0	0	0	0
1950	Great Britain	3	1	0	0	3

Thompson Danby (10 August 1926 – 26 December 2022) was an English dual-code international rugby union, and professional rugby league footballer who played in the 1940s and 1950s. He played representative level rugby union for England, and at club level for Harlequin F.C., as a wing, and representative level rugby league for Great Britain and England, and at club level for Salford, as a wing.

== Background ==
Born in Trimdon, County Durham, he signed for Salford in August 1949, and in doing so, he became the first England rugby union international recruited by Salford. He attended Barnard Castle School and went on to St John's College, York between 1943 and 1945.

== International honours ==
Danby won a cap for England (RU) in the 2–0 defeat by Wales on 15 January 1949.

Danby won cap s for England (RL) while at Salford in 1950 against Wales (two matches), and France, and won cap s for Great Britain (RL) while at Salford in 1950 against Australia (two matches), and New Zealand.

== Personal life and death ==
Tom Danby married Audrey Winifred Spencer (better known as "Penny" Spencer) on 26 June 1948 in Brighton. They had children; Christine H. Danby was born in Brighton in 1954 and Peter was born in 1956. After retiring from rugby Danby taught at Shebbear College for over 30 years.

Danby died at his home in East Sussex on 26 December 2022, at the age of 96. At the time of his death, Danby was the oldest surviving member of a Great Britain rugby league team.
