= Bill Callinan =

Australian rugby league footballer

Personal information
- Full name: William John Callinan
- Born: 23 November 1930 Morpeth, New South Wales, Australia
- Died: 23 June 1985 (aged 54) Gold Coast, Queensland

Playing information
- Position: Wing
Club
Years	Team	Pld	T	G	FG	P
1952–53	Western Suburbs	36	18	0	0	54
Representative
Years	Team	Pld	T	G	FG	P
1949	Queensland	2	0	0	0	0

Bill Callinan (1930-1985) was an Australian professional rugby league footballer who played in the 1950s. He played for Western Suburbs as a winger.

== Playing career ==
Callinan made his debut for Western Suburbs in 1952 against Balmain at Pratten Park. The same year Wests defeated South Sydney 22–10 in the grand final claiming their fourth and final premiership. The match was remembered due to its controversy with Souths claiming they were denied two legitimate tries and Western Suburbs being awarded a try off a blatant knock on. Callinan played one more season with Western Suburbs in 1953. At representative level, Callinan played for Queensland on two occasions.
