= Ernie Ashcroft =

Former Great Britain and England international rugby league footballer

Ernest J. Ashcroft

Personal information
- Full name: Ernest J. Ashcroft
- Born: 28 February 1925 Wigan, England
- Died: May 1985 (aged 59–60) Wigan, England

Playing information
- Position: Fullback, Wing, Centre
Club
Years	Team	Pld	T	G	FG	P
1942–58	Wigan	530	241	0		723
1958–61	Huddersfield	102	29	0	0	87
1961–62	Warrington	6	0	0	0	0
	Total	638	270	0	0	810
Representative
Years	Team	Pld	T	G	FG	P
1945–54	Lancashire	10	3	0	0	9
1946–51	England	11	2	0	0	6
	British Empire XIII
1947–54	Great Britain	11	3	0	0	9

Coaching information
Club
Years	Team	Gms	W	D	L	W%
1958–61	Huddersfield
1961–67	Warrington
	Total	0	0	0	0

Ernest "Ernie" J. Ashcroft (28 February 1925 – May 1985) was an English professional rugby league footballer who played in the 1940s, 1950s and 1960s, and coached in the 1950s and 1960s. He played at representative level for Great Britain, England, British Empire XIII and Lancashire, and at club level for Wigan, and Huddersfield, as a fullback, wing, or centre, and coached at club level for Huddersfield and Warrington.

== Background ==
Ernie Ashcroft was born in Wigan, Lancashire, England, and he died aged 60 in Wigan, Greater Manchester, England.

== Playing career ==
Ashcroft joined his hometown club Wigan during the Second World War. He made his début for Wigan in December 1942 against Oldham, and signed professional terms with the club a month later.

=== Championship final appearances ===
Ashcroft played on the wing in Wigan's 13-9 victory over Dewsbury in the Championship Final first-leg during the 1943–44 season at Central Park, Wigan on Saturday 13 May 1944, and played on the wing in the 12-5 victory over Dewsbury in the Championship Final second-leg during the 1943–44 season at Crown Flatt, Dewsbury on Saturday 20 May 1944, played at centre, and scored two tries in the 13-4 victory over Huddersfield in the Championship Final during the 1945–46 season at Maine Road, Manchester on Saturday 18 May 1946, and played at centre in the 13-4 victory over Dewsbury in the Championship Final during the 1946–47 season at Maine Road, Manchester on Saturday 21 June 1947.

=== County League appearances ===
Ashcroft played in Wigan's victories in the Lancashire League during the 1946–47 season, 1949–50 season and 1951–52 season.

=== Challenge Cup Final appearances ===
Ashcroft played at centre in Wigan's 8-3 victory over Bradford Northern in the 1947–48 Challenge Cup Final during the 1947–48 season at Wembley Stadium, London on Saturday 1 May 1948, in front of a crowd of 91,465.

=== County Cup Final appearances ===
Ashcroft played at centre and scored a try in Wigan's 3-7 defeat by Widnes in the 1945–46 Lancashire Cup Final during the 1945–46 season at Wilderspool Stadium, Warrington on Saturday 27 October 1945, played at centre in the 9-3 victory over Belle Vue Rangers in the 1946–47 Lancashire Cup Final during the 1946–47 season at Station Road, Swinton, on Saturday 26 October 1946, played stand-off in the 10-7 victory over Belle Vue Rangers in the 1947–48 Lancashire Cup Final during the 1947–48 season at Wilderspool Stadium, Warrington, on Saturday 1 November 1947, played at centre in the 14-8 victory over Warrington in the 1948–49 Lancashire Cup Final during the 1948–49 season at Station Road, Swinton, on Saturday 13 November 1948, played at centre in the 20-7 victory over Leigh in the 1949–50 Lancashire Cup Final during the 1949–50 season at Wilderspool Stadium, Warrington, on Saturday 29 October 1949. played at centre in the 14-6 victory over Leigh in the 1951–52 Lancashire Cup Final during the 1951–52 season at Station Road, Swinton on Saturday 27 October 1951, played at centre in the 8-16 defeat by St. Helens in the 1953–54 Lancashire Cup Final during the 1953-54 season at Station Road, Swinton on Saturday 24 October 1953, played at centre in the 8-13 defeat by Oldham in the 1957–58 Lancashire Cup Final during the 1957–58 season at Station Road, Swinton on Saturday 19 October 1957, played at centre, and was coach/captain in Huddersfield's 10-16 defeat by Wakefield Trinity in the 1960–61 Yorkshire Cup Final during the 1960–61 season at Headingley, Leeds on Saturday 29 October 1960.

=== International honours ===
Ashcroft won caps for England while at Wigan in 1946 against Wales, in 1947 against France, and Wales, in 1948 against France, in 1949 against France, and Other Nationalities, in 1950 against Wales, and France, in 1951 against Other Nationalities, Wales, and France, and won caps for Great Britain in 1947 against New Zealand (2 matches), in 1950 against Australia (2 matches), New Zealand, and Australia, and in 1954 against Australia (3 matches), and New Zealand (2 matches). He was also a reserve-to-travel for British Empire XIII in 1952 against New Zealand, and appeared ten times for Lancashire.

== Honours ==
- Championship (5): 1943–44, 1945–46, 1946–47, 1949–50, 1951–52
- Challenge Cup (1): 1948
- Lancashire League (4): 1945–46, 1946–47, 1949–50, 1951–52
- Lancashire Cup (5): 1946–47, 1947–48, 1948–49, 1949–50, 1951–52.
