= Perce Pritchard =

Australian rugby league footballer

Personal information
- Full name: Percival Victor Pritchard
- Born: 11 December 1925 Newcastle, New South Wales, Australia
- Died: 19 March 2012 (aged 86) Wallsend, New South Wales, Australia

Playing information
- Position: Halfback
Club
Years	Team	Pld	T	G	FG	P
1950–51	Manly-Warringah	17	2	1	0	8
Representative
Years	Team	Pld	T	G	FG	P
1947–50	New South Wales	3	3	0	0	9
1946–49	NSW Country	2	0	0	0	0
- Source: As of 5 April 2019

Percival Victor Pritchard (1925-2012) was an Australian rugby league footballer who played in the 1940s and 1950s.

Perce 'Peblo' Pritchard was a halfback from the South Newcastle club and represented New South Wales in 1947 before transferring to the Manly-Warringah Sea Eagles in 1950. Prichard played two seasons with Manly between 1950-1951 before returning to Merewether, New South Wales. He also represented New South Wales again in 1950, and captained Manly during his time at the club but ultimately lost his first grade position to a young Ken Arthurson.

Pritchard died on 19 March 2012, at Wallsend, New South Wales aged 86.
