= Martin Ryan (rugby league) =

GB & England international rugby league footballer

Personal information
- Full name: Martin Ryan
- Born: 28 August 1923
- Died: 13 January 2003 (aged 79)

Playing information
- Height: 5 ft 10 in (1.78 m)
- Weight: 13 st 11 lb (88 kg)
- Position: Fullback, Centre, Stand-off, Scrum-half
Club
Years	Team	Pld	T	G	FG	P
1940–54	Wigan	300	67	58^{†}		317
1943	→ St Helens (guest)	5	0	0	0	0
1955	Leigh	1	0	0	0	0
	Total	306	67	58	0	317
Representative
Years	Team	Pld	T	G	FG	P
1943–50	England	12	2	0	0	6
1947–50	Great Britain	4	0	0	0	0
- ^{†}Goal type not recorded. Added to "total goals" Source

Martin Ryan (28 August 1923 – 13 January 2003) was an English professional rugby league footballer who played in the 1940s and 1950s. He played at representative level for Great Britain and England, and at club level for Wigan, primarily at fullback, or centre. He also made five guest appearances for St Helens in 1943, plus one appearance for Leigh in 1955.

Ryan is credited with redefining the role of fullback from being a purely defensive role to one requiring counter-attacking skills.

== Playing career ==
=== Club career ===
Almost a one club man Ryan made his début for Wigan at centre and scored a try in the 21–0 victory over Oldham at Watersheddings, Oldham on Saturday 21 September 1940. His last try for Wigan was scored during the 13–6 victory over Bradford Northern in the Championship Final during the 1951–52 season at Leeds Road, Huddersfield on Saturday 10 May 1952. His 300th and last match was the 2–15 defeat by Workington Town at Borough Park, Workington on Saturday 20 September 1952.

In the early part of his career Ryan played mostly at centre but from 1945 onwards played primarily at fullback.

Ryan appeared in five consecutive Lancashire Cup finals between 1946 and 1950, appearing on the winning side in four. The only defeat was the first, a 3–7 defeat by Widnes in the 1945–46 Final at Wilderspool Stadium, Warrington on Saturday 27 October 1945. The next four were victories; 9–3 over Belle Vue Rangers in the 1946–47 final at Station Road, Swinton on Saturday 26 October 1946, a 10–7 victory over Belle Vue Rangers in the 1947–48 Final at Wilderspool Stadium, Warrington on Saturday 1 November 1947, a 14–8 victory over Warrington in the 1948–49 Final at Station Road, Swinton on Saturday 13 November 1948, and a 20–7 victory over Leigh in the 1949–50 Final during the 1949–50 season at Wilderspool on Saturday 29 October 1949.

Championship success came in the 1943–44 season where Ryan, playing out of position at stand-off played in both legs of the final against Dewsbury. A 13–9 victory at Central Park, Wigan on Saturday 13 May 1944 was followed by a 12–5 win at Crown Flatt, Dewsbury on Saturday 20 May 1944.

A Challenge Cup medal had to wait until 1948 when Ryan played fullback in Wigan's 8–3 victory over Bradford Northern in the 1947–48 Challenge Cup Final at Wembley Stadium, London on Saturday 1 May 1948.

A shoulder injury ended Ryan's playing career when aged only 30 but he remained on Wigan's books until January 1955 when the club placed him on the transfer list for a fee of £500. He signed for Leigh the same month, Wigan receiving half the desired fee - £250. Ryan made his one and only appearance for Leigh in February 1955 in a Challenge Cup match against Doncaster before the recurrence of the shoulder injury forced a permanent retirement. Ryan returned to Wigan as a director of the club in later years. Outside of rugby league Ryan worked in the brewing industry for the Burtonwood Brewery.

=== International honours ===
Ryan was first capped for England in 1943 against Wales and went on to appear for England a further 10 times; in 1945 against Wales, in 1946 against France (2 matches), and Wales, in 1947 against Wales (2 matches), in 1948 against France (2 matches), in 1949 against France (2 matches), in 1950 against Wales.

Ryan was selected to tour Australia and New Zealand as part of the 1946 Great Britain Lions tour squad but only played in four non-test games before a hernia and subsequent surgery ruled him out of the rest of the tour. His first cap came against New Zealand in 1947 as was followed by two caps against Australia in 1948 and a final cap against Australia in 1950.

== Relatives ==
Ryan's younger brother Andrew played for Warrington during the 1949–50 season.
