= Jack Troy =

Australia international rugby league footballer

Personal information
- Full name: John Bernard Troy
- Born: 1 August 1927
- Died: 20 January 1995 (aged 66) Forster, New South Wales, Australia

Playing information
- Position: Wing
Club
Years	Team	Pld	T	G	FG	P
1949–52	Newtown	34	37	0	0	111
1953	Eastern Suburbs	3	1	0	0	3
	Total	37	38	0	0	114
Representative
Years	Team	Pld	T	G	FG	P
1950	New South Wales	3	4	0	0	12
1950	Australia	2	0	0	0	0
1950	NSW City	1	1	0	0	3

John Bernard Troy (2 October 1928 – 20 January 1995), was an Australian rugby league footballer who played as a winger for Newtown and Eastern Suburbs in the New South Wales Rugby League (NSWRL), Australia's major rugby league competition. He also represented Australia internationally and New South Wales against Queensland.

== Newtown career ==
The son of a jockey, Troy was a professional runner, who after missing Olympic selection began his rugby league career with the Newtown club in 1949 where he played 4 seasons. In just 34 appearances for Newtown, the winger, scored 37 tries.

He holds the Newtown club record for the most tries in a match, scoring 6 against Eastern Suburbs in 1950, a feat that would not be repeated for another 71 years in Australia until Josh Addo-Carr of the Melbourne Storm achieved this in round 9 of the 2021 NRL season

Troy was the 1950 NSWRFL season top try scorer with 16 tries.

== Representative career ==
In 1950, he played two matches for New South Wales and then was selected to represent Australia. He played in first Australian test side to win the ashes in 30 years in which he played in the first and third test. He is listed on the Australian Players Register as Kangaroo No. 276.

In 1953, Troy joined the Eastern Suburbs club, but he only played in 3 matches after a constant leg injury forced his retirement. Troy is recognized as the Newtown Jets 410th player and the Tricolours 415th player.

== Administrative career ==
In his later years Jack Troy became chairman of selectors at the St. George Dragons.

== Death ==
Troy died in 1995 aged 66.
