= Keith Middleton =

Australian rugby league football (1931–2020)

Personal information
- Full name: Keith Middleton
- Born: 7 March 1931; Bermagui, New South Wales, Australia
- Died: 24 August 2020 (aged 89)

Playing information
- Position: Centre
Club
Years	Team	Pld	T	G	FG	P
1948–54	North Sydney	90	21	0	0	63
1956	South Sydney	12	0	0	0	0
	Total	102	21	0	0	63
Representative
Years	Team	Pld	T	G	FG	P
1950	Australia	3	0	0	0	0
1950–51	New South Wales	2	1	0	0	3
1951–53	NSW City	2	0	0	0	0

Keith Middleton (7 March 1931 – 24 August 2020) was an Australian professional rugby league footballer who played in the 1940s and 1950s. He played for North Sydney and South Sydney in the NSWRL competition as a centre.

== Playing career ==
Middleton was originally from Bermagui on the New South Wales South Coast but made the move to Sydney and signed for Norths in 1948. In 1950, Middleton was selected to play for Australia and made 3 appearances all against Great Britain winning the best of 3 series 2–1. Also in 1950, Middleton was selected to play for New South Wales against Queensland in the interstate series.

In 1952 and 1953, Middleton was a part of the Norths sides which reached the preliminary finals but fell short of a grand final appearance on both occasions, 1953 was also the final year that Middleton was selected for a representative side when he was selected to play for NSW City. In 1956, Middleton joined South Sydney and played with the club for one season before retiring.

== Death ==
Middleton died on 24 August 2020, at the age of 89.
