= Tommy Bradshaw =

Great Britain and England international rugby league footballer

Personal information
- Full name: Thomas Bradshaw
- Born: 11 October 1920 Wigan, England
- Died: 20 December 1981 (aged 61) Wigan, England

Playing information
- Position: Scrum-half
Club
| Years | Team | Pld | T | G | FG | P |
|---|---|---|---|---|---|---|
| 1939–52 | Wigan | 302 | 35 | 0 | 0 | 105 |
| 1940–41 | →Oldham (guest) | 1 | 0 | 0 | 0 | 0 |
| 1943 | →St Helens (guest) | 1 | 0 | 0 | 0 | 0 |
| 1952–54 | Leigh | 68 | 1 | 0 | 0 | 3 |
| 1954 | Workington Town | 2 | 0 | 0 | 0 | 0 |
| | Total | 374 | 36 | 0 | 0 | 108 |
Representative
| Years | Team | Pld | T | G | FG | P |
| 1942–47 | Lancashire | 3 |
| 1944–51 | England | 14 | 1 | 0 | 0 | 3 |
| 1947–50 | Great Britain | 5 | 0 | 0 | 0 | 0 |

Thomas Bradshaw (11 October 1920 – 20 December 1981) was an English professional rugby league footballer who played in the 1930s, 1940s and 1950s. He played at representative level for Great Britain, England and Lancashire, and at club level for Wigan, Leigh and Workington Town, plus a one-off WW2 guest appearance for St Helens and Oldham RLFC, as a scrum-half.

== Playing career ==
=== Championship final appearances ===
Tommy Bradshaw played scrum-half in Wigan's 12–5 victory over Dewsbury in the Championship Final second-leg during the 1943–44 season at Crown Flatt, Dewsbury on Saturday 20 May 1944 (Hector Gee having played scrum-half in the first-leg), played scrum-half in the 13–4 victory over Huddersfield in the Championship Final during the 1945–46 season at Maine Road, Manchester on Saturday 18 May 1946, and played scrum-half, and scored a try, in the 13–4 victory over Dewsbury in the Championship Final during the 1946–47 season at Maine Road, Manchester on Saturday 21 June 1947.

=== County League appearances ===
Tommy Bradshaw played in Wigan's victories in the Lancashire League during the 1945–46 season, 1946–47 season, 1949–50 season and 1951–52 season.

=== Challenge Cup Final appearances ===
Tommy Bradshaw played scrum-half in Wigan's 8–3 victory over Bradford Northern in the 1947–48 Challenge Cup Final during the 1947–48 season at Wembley Stadium, London on Saturday 1 May 1948, in front of a crowd of 91,465. and played scrum-half in the 10–0 victory over Barrow in the 1950–51 Challenge Cup Final during the 1950–51 season at Wembley Stadium, London on Saturday 5 May 1951.

=== County Cup Final appearances ===
Tommy Bradshaw played scrum-half in Wigan's 3–7 defeat by Widnes in the 1945–46 Lancashire Cup Final during the 1945–46 season at Wilderspool Stadium, Warrington on Saturday 27 October 1945, played scrum-half in the 9–3 victory over Belle Vue Rangers in the 1946–47 Lancashire Cup Final during the 1946–47 season at Station Road, Swinton, on Saturday 26 October 1946, played scrum-half in the 10–7 victory over Belle Vue Rangers in the 1947–48 Lancashire Cup Final during the 1947–48 season at Wilderspool Stadium, Warrington, on Saturday 1 November 1947, and played scrum-half in the 20–7 victory over Leigh in the 1949–50 Lancashire Cup Final during the 1949–50 season at Wilderspool Stadium, Warrington, on Saturday 29 October 1949.

=== International honours ===
Tommy Bradshaw won caps for England while at Wigan in 1944 against Wales, in 1945 against Wales, in 1946 against Wales, and France, in 1947 against France (2 matches), and Wales (2 matches), in 1948 against France, in 1949 against Other Nationalities, and France, in 1950 against Wales (2 matches), in 1951 against Other Nationalities, and won caps for Great Britain while at Wigan in 1947 against New Zealand (2 matches), and in 1950 against Australia (3 matches), and New Zealand.
