= Jack Hilton =

GB & England international rugby league footballer

Personal information
- Full name: John Hilton
- Born: 2 May 1921 Wigan, England
- Died: 23 December 1998 (aged 77) Wigan, England

Playing information
- Position: Wing
Club
Years	Team	Pld	T	G	FG	P
	Salford
1942–54	Wigan	137	122	0	0	366
	Total	137	122	0	0	366
Representative
Years	Team	Pld	T	G	FG	P
1948–52	Lancashire	4	0	0	0	0
1948–50	England	3	4	0	0	12
1950	Great Britain	4	2	0	0	6

John "Jack" Hilton (2 May 1921 – 23 December 1998) was an English rugby league footballer who played in the 1940s and 1950s, and director. He played at representative level for Great Britain and England, and at club level for Wigan, as a wing. He later became a director at Wigan, and also had a spell as club chairman.

== Biography ==
=== Club career ===
Born in Wigan, England on 2 May 1921, Hilton started his professional career at Salford. In October 1939, he scored six tries in a game against Leigh, a joint club record for number of tries scored in a single match. He later joined his hometown club Wigan, scoring 122 tries in 137 appearances. Hilton played on the wing, and scored a try in Wigan's 8-3 victory over Bradford Northern in the 1947–48 Challenge Cup Final during the 1947–48 season at Wembley Stadium, London on Saturday 1 May 1948, in front of a crowd of 91,465. Hilton played on the wing, and scored a try in Wigan's 20–7 victory over Leigh in the 1949–50 Lancashire Cup Final during the 1949–50 season at Wilderspool Stadium, Warrington on Saturday 29 October 1949.

=== International honours ===
Hilton won caps for England while at Wigan in 1949 against France, in 1950 against Wales, and France, and won caps for Great Britain while at Wigan in 1950 against Australia (2 matches), and New Zealand (2 matches).
