= Ned Andrews =

Australian rugby league player

Personal information
- Full name: Neville Thomas Marchese Andrews
- Born: 6 April 1922 Maitland, NSW, Australia
- Died: 2 January 2012 (aged 89) Merewether, NSW, Australia

Playing information
- Position: Centre / Five-eighth
Representative
Years	Team	Pld	T	G	FG	P
1948	New South Wales	4	2	0	0	6
1950	Queensland	1	0	0	0	0
1950	Australia	1	0	0	0	0

Neville Thomas Marchese "Ned" Andrews OAM (6 April 1922 – 2 January 2012) was an Australian international rugby league player and trade unionist.

Raised in Newcastle, Andrews left school aged 14 and served with the AIF in New Guinea during World War II.

Andrews started his rugby league career with South Newcastle and earned New South Wales representative honours in 1948. He also toured Queensland with a Newcastle representative team that year and impressed Mackay club officials, who recruited him as captain-coach. In 1950, Andrews was a centre for Australia in the 2nd Test against Great Britain in Brisbane and played well until pulling a leg muscle late in the first half.

A State Dockyard Union worker, Andrews was awarded a Medal of the Order of Australia (OAM) in the 1983 Queen's Birthday Honours for services to "industry and to trade unionism".
