= Ronald John Yates =

Australian business executive

Ronald John Yates, AM (died 25 October 2012), was a CEO of Qantas (retired 1986) and a Member of the Order of Australia. He was also the "Vice President – Australasia & Chair of Safety Awards Committee" at the International Federation of Airworthiness.

Yates graduated from the University of Sydney in 1944.

== See also ==
- Australian Civil Aviation Safety Authority
- International Civil Aviation Organization
