= 1946 Great Britain Lions tour =

- Manager: W. Poppleton and W. Gabbatt
- Tour captain(s): Gus Risman
- Top point scorer(s): Ernest Ward (101)
- Top try scorer(s): Jimmy Lewthwaite (25)
- Top test point scorer(s): Arthur Bassett (15)
- Top test try scorer(s): Arthur Bassett (5)
Summary
P	W	D	L
Total
27	21	1	5
Test match
4	2	1	1
Opponent
P	W	D	L
Australia
3	2	1	0
New Zealand
1	0	0	1

Tour chronology
- Previous tour: 1936
- Next tour: 1950

The 1946 Great Britain Lions tour was a tour by the Great Britain national rugby league team of Australia and New Zealand which took place between April and August 1946. The tour involved a schedule of 27 games: 20 in Australia including a three-test series against Australia for the Ashes, and a further 7 in New Zealand including one test match against New Zealand.

Captained by Gus Risman, the Lions returned home having won 21, drawn 1 and lost 5 of their games. The team lost the test match against New Zealand but in winning the Ashes against Australia 2–0 (with one match drawn) they became the only Great Britain team to date to be unbeaten in a Test series against Australia in Australia.

Despite being a British team – 11 of the squad were Welsh – the team played, and were often referred to by both the press at home and away, as England. The team became known by the nickname The Indomitables due to their travelling to Australia on-board the aircraft carrier HMS Indomitable.

The tour was the first major sporting series played abroad by a British side in any sport after the Second World War.

== Background ==
In September 1945 the Australian Minister for External Affairs, H. V. Evatt issued an invitation to the Rugby Football League (RFL) to send a team to Australia during the summer of 1946. The RFL were at first unsure about accepting due to the state of the game in Britain after the war but after consulting with the clubs, the offer was accepted on a 19–4 vote in October 1945 subject to suitable travelling arrangements being made.

The issue of transport to Australia almost resulted in the tour being cancelled; the travel arrangements were the responsibility of the Australian authorities who were unable to find passage on a commercial ship. As late as the beginning of March 1946 there was a likelihood that the tour would not go ahead. Eventually the Australian High Commission in London arranged transport on the Royal Navy aircraft carrier HMS Indomitable, the first time a rugby league team had travelled by warship.

Travel to and from New Zealand was also an issue. Again the shortage of commercial shipping was the problem and in June the New Zealand leg of the tour was in jeopardy because of the unavailability of a ship back to Britain until the end of August. Arrangements were made for some of the squad to fly to Auckland from Sydney before the third test against Australia with the rest flying after the third test, and berths were found on the RMS Rangitiki.

== Squad ==
On previous tours it had been the practice for every playing position to be duplicated in player selection to cover for injuries but this practice was not followed for this tour, with 15 backs and only 11 forwards selected, including five centres and only three prop-forwards. The 26 man squad was announced in March 1946. Appointed captain was Salford centre Gus Risman with Widnes scrum-half Tommy McCue as vice-captain. Risman and McCue were the only members of the squad who had been on the previous tour to Australia and New Zealand in 1936. The tour was one of the first to use squad numbering rather than position numbering.

Backs
Squad number	Name	Club
Fullbacks
1	Martin Ryan	Wigan
2	Joe Jones	Barrow
Threequarters
Right wings
3	Eric Batten	Bradford Northern
4	Jimmy Lewthwaite	Barrow
Left wings
10	Arthur Bassett	Halifax
11	Albert Johnson	Warrington
Centres
5	Gus Risman	Salford
6	Ernest Ward	Bradford Northern
7	Ted Ward	Wigan
8	Bryn Knowelden	Barrow
9	Jack Kitching	Bradford Northern
Half-backs
Stand-offs
12	Willie Horne	Barrow
13	Willie Davies	Bradford Northern
Scrum-halfs
14	Tommy McCue	Widnes
15	Dai Jenkins	Leeds

Forwards
Squad number	Name	Club
Front row
Hookers
19	Joe Egan	Wigan
20	George Curran	Salford
Props
16	Frank Whitcombe	Bradford Northern
17	Fred Hughes	Workington
18	Ken Gee	Wigan
Back row
Second-rows
21	Bob Nicholson	Huddersfield
22	Doug Phillips	Oldham
23	Les White	York
24	Trevor Foster	Bradford Northern
Loose forwards
25	Harry Murphy	Wakefield Trinity
26	Ike Owens	Leeds

The team manager was W. Poppleton of Bramley and W. Gabbatt of Barrow was the business manager. W. Crockford of Hull Kingston Rovers represented the Rugby Football League Council, although he was not officially a member of the squad management and was paying his own way.

Following the announcement of the squad the Rugby Football League (RFL) entered into discussions with the War Office over leave of absence for White, Phillips and Ernie Ward as all three were still serving soldiers. Initially the War Office refused permission for White and Phillips, but following representations to the Secretary of State for War, Jack Lawson, the decision was overturned within 24 hours and permission given for the three to tour. Had permission not been granted the RFL had already identified replacements; R. Robson of Huddersfield for Phillips, E. Watkins of Wigan for White and S. Rookes of Hunslet for Ward.

Each player was paid 30/- shillings per week at sea and 50/- per week on land with their wives receiving £3 per week and 7/6 (seven shillings and six pence) per child.

The tour was also the first with an official press presence. Three British news reporters, Ernest Crawthorne of the Manchester Evening News, Alfred Drewery of The Yorkshire Post and Eddie Waring of the Sunday Pictorial all accompanied the team on the voyage and around Australia and New Zealand. Once in Australia they were joined by Australian journalist, Harry Sunderland.

== Schedule and results ==
The squad sailed from Devonport on 3 April 1946 and arrived in Fremantle on 30 April. Indomitable was supposed to continue to Sydney but for operational reasons the voyage was curtailed at Fremantle. The team as well as a large number of navy personnel and returning Australian and New Zealand soldiers were disembarked and travelled by train across Australia, leaving Fremantle on 8 May and arriving in Sydney on 12 May.

Prior to leaving Fremantle the squad played an exhibition match, fulfilling a commitment made to the captain of the Indomitable during the voyage; splitting into two teams, McCue's "Reds" beat Risman's "Blues" 24–5. A collection for naval charities raised £44 to which the RFL added £10/10.

Date	Opponents	Venue	Score (GB first)	Attendance	Notes
22 May	Southern Districts	Junee	Won 36–4	6,135	Southern Districts was the representative team for clubs in Group 9 of the New South Wales Country Rugby League
29 May	Group 8 Rugby League	Manuka Oval, Canberra	Won 45–12	5,095	
1 June	New South Wales	Sydney Cricket Ground	Won 14–10	51,364	
2 June	South Coast Division	The Showground, Wollongong	Lost 12–15	12,000	South Coast Division was a representative team for clubs in the Illawarra Rugby League
8 June	New South Wales	Sydney Cricket Ground	Won 21–7	47,431	
12 June	Western Districts	Orange	Won 33–2	8,318	Western Districts was the representative team for clubs in Group 10 of the New South Wales country rugby league
15 June	Newcastle	The Sports Ground, Newcastle	Lost 13–18	17,134	
17 June	Australia	Sydney Cricket Ground	Drawn; 8–8	64,527	
19 June	Northern Districts	Tamworth Oval, Tamworth	Won 61–5	7,270	Northern District was the representative tea for clubs in Group 4 of the New South Wales country rugby league
22 June	Queensland	Brisbane Cricket Ground	Lost 24–25	21,500	
25 June	Wide Bay	Bundaberg	Won 16–12	6,356	
27 June	Central Queensland	Rockhampton	Won 35–12	7,070	
30 June	North Queensland	Townsville	Won 55–16	7,567	
2 July	Mackay	Mackay	Won 94–0	5,044	Mackay was the representative team for clubs in the Mackay & District Rugby League. The score set a new record for a touring side against a representative team.
6 July	Australia	Brisbane Exhibition Ground	Won 14–5	40,500	
9 July	Brisbane Firsts	Brisbane Cricket Ground	Won 21–15	15,722	
11 July	Ipswich	Ipswich	Won 29–12	5,200	
13 July	Toowoomba	Toowoomba	Won 34–5	9,863	Before the game started the roof of a building at the ground collapsed due to over 200 people standing on it in an attempt to see the game. One person was injured in the collapse and was taken to hospital.
16 July	North Coast	The Showground, Grafton	Won 53–8	6,955	North Coast was the representative team for clubs in Group 2 and Group 3 of the NSW Country Rugby League
20 July	Australia	Sydney Cricket Ground	Won 20–7	35,294	

The third test was the final match of the Australian leg of the tour. To transfer to New Zealand it had been arranged for the team to fly, the size of the aircraft involved made it necessary for the party to travel by three separate flights from Rose Bay Water Airport on 22, 23 and 24 July.

Date	Opponents	Venue	Score (GB first)	Attendance	Notes
24 July	South Island	Christchurch	Won 24–12	8,000	
27 July	West Coast	Victoria Park, Greymouth	Lost 8–17	4,000	
31 July	Māori	Wellington	Won 32–8	10,000	
3 August	Auckland	Carlaw Park, Auckland	Won 9–7	18,000	
6 August	South Auckland	Huntly	Won 42–12	3,000	
10 August	New Zealand	Carlaw Park, Auckland	Lost 8–13	11,000	
12 August	Auckland	Carlaw Park, Auckland	Won 22–9	12,400	

The team sailed for home on 14 August on-board RMS Rangitiki arriving at Tilbury on 24 September.

== Ashes series ==
=== Test venues ===
The three Ashes series tests took place at the following venues.

Sydney	Brisbane
Sydney Cricket Ground	Brisbane Exhibition Ground
Capacity: 70,000	Capacity: 42,000

=== First test ===
17 June 1946
3:00 pm AEDT

Australia	8–8	(United Kingdom) England
Tries: Ron Bailey; Lionel Cooper; Goals: Joe Jorgenson		Tries: Willie Horne; Frank Whitcombe; Goals: Gus Risman

Sydney Cricket Ground, Sydney
Attendance: 64,527
Referee: Tom McMahon Jr.

Team details
Australia		Position	England
Name	Number	Position	Number	Name
Dave Parkinson	13	FB	5	Gus Risman (c)
Lionel Cooper	9	WG	3	Eric Batten
Joe Jorgenson (c)	10	CE	6	Ernest Ward
Ron Bailey	11	CE	9	Jack Kitching
Edgar Newham	12	WG	11	Albert Johnson
Pat Devery	8	FE/SO	12	Willie Horne
John Grice	7	HB/SH	14	Tommy McCue
Roy Westaway	3	PR	16	Frank Whitcombe
George Watt	2	HK	19	Joe Egan
Frank Farrell	1	PF	18	Ken Gee
Reg Kay	5	SR	23	Les White
Arthur Clues	4	SR	22	Doug Phillips
Noel Mulligan	6	LK/LF	26	Ike Owens

The first test was played at Sydney Cricket Ground on 17 June 1946. Queues to get into the ground started the previous evening and by 7:30 am on the morning of the test the Australian authorities felt it necessary to open the gates to the ground several hours early and by 11:30 am the ground was full.

The game kicked off as scheduled and England took an early lead as stand-off Willie Horne scored a try in only the third minute after picking up a wayward Australian pass close to the Australian line. Risman missed the conversion, the first of several misses in his kicking game during the match. Australian captain Joe Jorgenson kicked a penalty soon after to make the score 3–2 to England. The talking point of the match came after half an hour of the first half when England centre Jack Kitching was sent off for punching Jorgenson. Despite the dismissal England took a 6–2 lead when Frank Whitcombe scored a try just before half-time.

In the second half, with England disorganised after Kitching's dismissal, Australia fought back and brought the score to 6–5 with a try by centre Ron Bailey. England extended struck back as Risman kicked a penalty but with ten minutes left Australia equalised as winger Lionel Cooper scored a try. In the closing minutes both Risman and Jorgenson missed penalty chances which could have won the game for their countries. Most observers agreed that England would probably have won if the sending-off of Kitching hadn't happened.

After the game Kitching said he had pushed Jorgenson away and claimed he had been bitten. Jorgenson denied he had bitten Kitching and the judicial committee of the New South Wales Rugby League agreed dismissing Kitching's claim without hearing from Jorgenson and cautioning Kitching for punching. With this Kitching and the English management wanted to forget the whole incident but Jorgenson wanted a hearing to clear his name, but the committee declined the request and reiterated that they had no evidence Jorgenson had bitten Kitching, Jorgenson was not guilty of any improper conduct and "his good name and the team record had not been impaired" and that there was no need for Jorgenson to appear before the committee.

=== Second test ===
6 July 1946
2:30 pm AEDT

Australia	5–14	(United Kingdom) England
Tries: Lionel Cooper; Goals: Joe Jorgenson		Tries: Arthur Bassett (3); Albert Johnson; Goals: Ernest Ward

Brisbane Exhibition Ground, Brisbane
Attendance: 40,500
Referee: Stan Chambers

Team details
Australia		Position	England
Name	Number	Position	Number	Name
Dave Parkinson	13	FB	6	Ernest Ward
Lionel Cooper	9	WG	10	Arthur Bassett
Joe Jorgenson (c)	10	CE	5	Gus Risman (c)
Ron Bailey	11	CE	7	Ted Ward
Edgar Newham	12	WG	11	Albert Johnson
Pat Devery	8	FE/SO	12	Willie Horne
John Grice	7	HB/SH	14	Tommy McCue
Roy Westaway	3	PR	16	Frank Whitcombe
George Watt	2	HK	19	Joe Egan
Frank Farrell	1	PF	18	Ken Gee
Reg Kay	5	SR	23	Les White
Arthur Clues	4	SR	22	Doug Phillips
Jack Hutchinson	6	LK/LF	26	Ike Owens

After the drawn test in Sydney, England only needed to win the second test to retain the Ashes as a tied series would result in the holders keeping the trophy. Australia made just one change to their side with loose forward Jack Hutchinson replacing the injured Noel Mulligan; the captaincy also changed as Ron Bailey succeeded fellow centre Joe Jorgenson. England made two changes with Arthur Bassett replacing an injured Eric Batten on the wing and Ted Ward replacing the suspended Jack Kitching. Also in the backs Gus Risman and Ernest Ward swapped positions to Ward at fullback and Risman at centre.

The game was played at the Brisbane Exhibition Ground on 6 July 1946. Despite a public transport strike and continuing restrictions on non-essential travel, huge queues had formed outside the ground by early morning and the gates were opened at 7 am, several hours before kick off. By 10 am the ground was full and the gates locked; this was unpopular with the thousands still outside the ground and the gates were crashed and an estimated additional 10,000 people broke into the ground. This still left many more outside the ground and the Australian team who had set off early for the ground had considerable trouble gaining entrance; the England side only got to the ground due to the police arranging an escort for the team cars and forcing their way through the crowds.

When the match started it was a closely contested game for the first quarter before England opened scoring as debutant Arthur Bassett gained possession from a McCue kick to score a try on the wing. The only other points of the first half were from Ernest Ward's boot as he scored a penalty from outside the Australian 25-yard (20-metre) line.

With England starting the second half with a 5–0 lead, Australia had to score first to get back into the game and minutes into the second half they did so as Jorgenson put a penalty over to make the score 5–2. Shortly afterwards though Bassett scored his second try to increase England's lead to six points. Australia came back with a try through captain Ron Bailey before England scored two further tries to put the game beyond Australia's reach; the first was scored by Albert Johnson and then Bassett completed his hat trick to make the score 14–5. Just before the end England hooker Joe Egan was sent off for hitting Australian second-rower Arthur Clues after Clues made a heavy tackle on Ernest Ward which Egan thought should have been penalised by the referee. As he was leaving the pitch Egan was heard to say "If the referee won't do his job, then someone has to". Soon after the game ended and England had retained the Ashes.

The attendance was officially recorded as 40,500 but estimates are that the number watching was closed to 60,000 when the gatecrashers and members of the Royal National Agricultural and Industrial Association of Queensland (owners of the ground) are included.

=== Third test ===
20 July 1946
3:00 pm AEDT

Australia	7–20	(United Kingdom) England
Tries: Clem Kennedy; Goals: Joe Jorgenson (2)		Tries: Arthur Bassett (2); George Curran; Ike Owens; Goals: Gus Risman (3); Ted Ward

Sydney Cricket Ground, Sydney
Attendance: 35,294
Referee: Tom McMahon Jr.

Team details
Australia		Position	England
Name	Number	Position	Number	Name
Dave Parkinson	13	FB	6	Ernest Ward
Lionel Cooper	9	WG	10	Arthur Bassett
Joe Jorgenson (c)	10	CE	5	Gus Risman (c)
Trevor Eather	11	CE	7	Ted Ward
Noel White	16	WG	3	Eric Batten
Pat Devery	8	FE/SO	12	Willie Horne
Clem Kennedy	7	HB/SH	14	Tommy McCue
Jim Armstrong	3	PR	20	George Curran
George Watt	2	HK	19	Joe Egan
Frank Farrell	1	PF	18	Ken Gee
Reg Kay	5	SR	23	Les White
Arthur Clues	4	SR	22	Doug Phillips
Noel Mulligan	6	LK/LF	26	Ike Owens

England came into the game making two changes from the previous test. Prop Frank Whitcombe was replaced by George Curran and Eric Batten was recalled to the wing. Australia made five changes with Trevor Eather, Noel White and Clem Kennedy being called up into the backs while Jim Armstrong and Noel Mulligan came into the forwards.

With the Ashes already decided the game at Sydney Cricket Ground on 20 July was about pride for both teams and the match was hotly contested from the start. Almost a quarter of the game had gone before either side scored and it was Australia who took the lead as Joe Jorgenson kicked a penalty. England equalised with a Gus Risman field goal before another Jorgenson penalty restores Australia's lead. Australia then scored the game's first try; George Watt collecting a wayward England kick and passing to Clem Kennedy who scored the try. At half-time Australia led 7–2 but that was to be short-lived as the second half started with England scoring eight points in the first four minutes of the half. First was a Risman penalty, then tries from Arthur Bassett and Curran to put England 12–8 ahead. Australia mounted pressure on the English line but lost momentum when Arthur Clues was sent-off for attempting a dangerous swinging arm tackle on Risman. Clues actually missed Risman but the attempt was so blatant that the referee had to send Clues off. England made use of the one-man advantage and scored two further converted tries, the first by Ike Owens and the second, right at the end of the game, by Bassett to win 20–7.

== New Zealand test ==
10 August 1946
3:00PM NZDT

New Zealand	13–8	(United Kingdom) England
Tries: Bruce Graham; Goals: Warwick Clarke (5)		Tries: Eric Batten; Ernest Ward; Goals: Ernest Ward

Carlaw Park, Auckland
Attendance: 11,000
Referee: J. Donovan

Team details
New Zealand		Position	England
Name	Number	Position	Number	Name
Warwick Clarke	1	FB	1	Joe Jones
Roy Nurse	2	WG	2	Albert Johnson
Len Jordan	3	CE	3	Bryn Knowelden
Maurie Robertson	4	CE	4	Ernest Ward
Bill Mountford	5	WG	5	Eric Batten
Roy Clark	6	FE/SO	6	Willie Davies
Rex Cunningham	7	HB/SH	7	Tommy McCue (c)
John Newton	8	PR	8	Bob Nicholson
Bob Aynsley	9	HK	9	George Curran
Bruce Graham	10	PF	10	Ken Gee
Arthur Gillman	11	SR	11	Les White
Charlie McBride	12	SR	12	Trevor Foster
Travers Hardwick	13	LK/LF	13	Ike Owens

The sole test match in New Zealand was played at a rain-soaked Carlaw Park in Auckland on 10 August 1946. England gave test debuts to three players; Joe Jones, Trevor Foster and Bryn Knowelden while the entire New Zealand team were previously uncapped.

On a very heavy pitch the first half was played with many stoppages by the referee and no tries were scored. Instead New Zealand led 6–0 at half-time through three penalties kicked by fullback Warwick Clarke.

The second half coincided with more rain that hampered ball-handling for the rest of the game. England came back with tries by Eric Batten and Ernest Ward to equalise. Ward then kicked a penalty to put England ahead before New Zealand took a winning lead as Bruce Graham scored a try after catching a Clarke penalty attempt that rebounded from the goalpost. Clarke's conversion and his kicking a further penalty made the final score 13–8.

== Finances ==
Net receipts for the tour were £46,312 (£38,226 from the Australian matches and £8,085 from the New Zealand leg) of which England's share was £27,782 (60%). Expenses and allowances to the players and their families amounted to £18,145 leaving a profit of £9,647. Of this a third was split between the squad who therefore received £123/13/7 each and the remainder of £6,431 went to the RFL.

== Statistics ==
Overall England outscored their opponents almost 3:1 scoring 783 points while conceding 276.

	Played	Won	Drawn	Lost	Points for	Tries scored	Goals scored	Points against	Tries conceded	Goals conceded
Overall	27	21	1	5	783	181	120	276	48	66
In Australia	20	16	1	3	638	146	100	198	36	45
In New Zealand	7	5	0	2	145	35	20	78	12	21

All 26 players appeared at some point on the tour. Harry Murphy was unlucky and broke a collarbone during the match against Group 8 which ruled him out of the rest of the tour having played just the single match. Martin Ryan also missed most of the tour after being diagnosed with a hernia which required an operation and lengthy convalescence.

Appearances
Name	Matches played	Tries scored	Goals scored	Points scored
Martin Ryan	4	1	0	3
Joe Jones	11	1	1	5
Eric Batten	13	18	0	54
Jimmy Lewthwaite	15	25	0	75
Arthur Bassett	11	18	0	54
Albert Johnson	17	15	3	51
Gus Risman	14	3	31	71
Ernest Ward	16	5	43	101
Ted Ward	12	5	32	79
Bryn Knowelden	13	15	0	45
Jack Kitching	12	17	0	51
Willie Horne	14	9	6	39
Willie Davies	14	5	0	15
Tommy McCue	15	0	0	0
Dai Jenkins	11	1	0	3
Joe Egan	17	6	0	18
George Curran	16	2	0	6
Frank Whitcombe	19	3	0	9
Fred Hughes	13	4	0	12
Ken Gee	18	1	0	3
Bob Nicholson	11	5	0	15
Doug Phillips	18	3	0	9
Les White	18	6	0	18
Trevor Foster	10	1	0	3
Harry Murphy	1	1	0	3
Ike Owens	18	11	4	41
