= Albert Johnson (rugby league, born 1918) =

GB & England international rugby league footballer

Personal information
- Full name: Albert Edward Johnson
- Born: 17 July 1918
- Died: 5 August 1998 (aged 80)

Playing information
- Position: Wing
Club
Years	Team	Pld	T	G	FG	P
1939–51	Warrington	198	112	2	0	340
1940–40	→ St Helens (guest)	1	1	0	0	3
1943–44	→ Wigan (guest)	24	15	0	0	45
	Total	223	128	2	0	388
Representative
Years	Team	Pld	T	G	FG	P
1944–47	England	11	6	0	0	18
1946–47	Great Britain	6	2	0	0	6
1946–47	Lancashire	4	2	0	0	6

Albert Edward Johnson (17 July 1918 – 5 August 1998) was an English professional rugby league footballer who played in the 1930s, 1940s and 1950s. He played at representative level for Great Britain and England, and at club level for Warrington, as a wing. He also appeared for St Helens and Wigan as a World War II guest player.

== Playing career ==
=== Club career ===
Johnson played on the wing in Warrington's 19-0 victory over Widnes in the 1950–51 Challenge Cup Final during the 1949–50 season at Wembley Stadium, London on Saturday 6 May 1950, in front of a crowd of 94,249.

Johnson played on the wing and scored a try in Warrington's 8-14 defeat by Wigan in the 1948 Lancashire Cup Final during the 1948–49 season at Station Road, Swinton on Saturday 13 November 1948, and played on the wing in the 5-28 defeat by Wigan in the 1950 Lancashire Cup Final during the 1950–51 season at Station Road, Swinton on Saturday 4 November 1950.

He played 198 games for the club, and is a Warrington Wolves Hall of Fame inductee.

=== International honours ===
Johnson won caps for England while at Warrington in 1944 against Wales, in 1945 against Wales (2 matches), in 1946 against France (2 matches), and Wales (2 matches), in 1947 against France (2 matches), and Wales, and won caps for Great Britain while at Warrington in 1946 against Australia (2 matches), and New Zealand, and in 1947 against New Zealand (3 matches).
