= Bill Hudson (rugby league) =

English rugby league coach (c. 1918–1989)

Personal information
- Full name: William Hudson
- Born: c. 1918
- Died: 1989 (aged 71) Wakefield, England

Playing information
- Position: Prop, Second-row, Loose forward
Club
Years	Team	Pld	T	G	FG	P
1935–47	Batley	208	18	0	0	54
1947–50	Wigan
1950–52	Wakefield Trinity	50	12	0	0	36
	Total	258	30	0	0	90
Representative
Years	Team	Pld	T	G	FG	P
1946–49	Yorkshire	3	0	0	0	0
1946–49	England	4	0	0	0	0
1949	Great Britain	1	0	0	0	0

Coaching information
Club
Years	Team	Gms	W	D	L	W%
1956–57	Featherstone Rovers	41	20	21	0	49

William Hudson (c. 1918 – 1989) was an English professional rugby league footballer who played in the 1940s and 1950s, and coached in the 1950s. He played at representative level for Great Britain, England and Yorkshire, and at club level for Batley, Wigan and Wakefield Trinity (captain), as a prop, second-row, or loose forward, and coached at club level for Featherstone Rovers.

== Playing career ==
=== Club career ===
Hudson started his career at Batley, making his debut in August 1935. He went on to make over 200 appearances for the club.

In October 1947, Hudson was transferred to Wigan for a record fee of £2,000. He made his début for the club in the 14–3 victory over Rochdale Hornets at Central Park, Wigan on Saturday 8 November 1947, and scored his first try in the 34–13 victory over Castleford at Central Park, Wigan on Saturday 21 February 1948. Hudson played loose forward in Wigan's 8–3 victory over Bradford Northern in the 1947–48 Challenge Cup Final during the 1947–48 season at Wembley Stadium, London on Saturday 1 May 1948, in front of a crowd of 91,465.

Hudson played loose forward in Wigan's 14–8 victory over Warrington in the 1948–49 Lancashire Cup Final during the 1948–49 season at Station Road, Swinton on Saturday 13 November 1948.

During the 1949–50 season, he played at second-row in the 20–7 victory over Leigh in the 1949–50 Lancashire Cup Final at Wilderspool Stadium, Warrington on Saturday 29 October 1949. He scored his last try for Wigan in the 33–2 victory over Widnes at Central Park, Wigan on Wednesday 19 April 1950. In his final appearance for the club, he helped Wigan win the Championship Final for the 1949–50 season with a 20–2 victory over Huddersfield at Maine Road, Manchester on Saturday 13 May 1950.

Hudson joined Wakefield Trinity in August 1950 for a transfer fee of £1,000, and was later named as the club's captain. He played at prop in Wakefield Trinity’s 17–3 victory over Keighley in the 1951–52 Yorkshire Cup Final during the 1951–52 season at the Fartown Ground, Huddersfield on Saturday 27 October 1951. He announced his retirement in August 1952.

=== Representative honours ===
Bill Hudson was selected for Yorkshire County XIII while at Batley during the 1946–47 season, and at Wakefield Trinity during the 1950–51 season.

Bill Hudson won caps for England while at Batley in 1946 against Wales, and France, in 1947 against France, while at Wigan in 1949 against France, and won caps for Great Britain while at Wigan in 1949 against Australia.

Bill Hudson played at second-row in Great Britain's 23–9 victory over Australia in the third Ashes Test Match at Odsal Stadium, Bradford on Saturday 29 January 1949. Bill Hudson replaced the injured(?) Bob Nicholson of Huddersfield who had played the first and second Ashes Test Matches.

== Coaching career ==
Bill Hudson was appointed as the coach of Featherstone Rovers in 1956. In March 1957, Hudson left the club shortly after becoming landlord of a pub in Scunthorpe.

Achievements
Preceded by Bill Davies	Rugby League Transfer Record; Batley to Wigan; 1947-1948	Succeeded by Jimmy Ledgard
