= Ted Toohey =

English RL coach and former GB & England international rugby league footballer

Personal information
- Full name: A. Edward Toohey
- Born: fourth ¼ 1926; Wigan, England
- Died: 26 November 1979 (aged 53); Wigan, England

Playing information
- Position: Centre, Scrum-half
Club
Years	Team	Pld	T	G	FG	P
1943–47	Wigan	35	11	0	0	33
1947–≥47	Barrow
1956/57–56/57	Leigh	25	3	0	0	9
≤1961–61	Liverpool City
	Total	60	14	0	0	42
Representative
Years	Team	Pld	T	G	FG	P
1952	England	2	0	0	0	0
1952	Great Britain	3	1	0	0	3

Coaching information
Club
Years	Team	Gms	W	D	L	W%
1974–75	Wigan

A. Edward Toohey (birth registered fourth ¼ 1926 – 26 November 1979) was an English professional rugby league footballer who played in the 1940s, 1950s and 1960s, and coached in the 1970s. He played at representative level for Great Britain and England, and at club level for Wigan, Barrow, Leigh and Liverpool City, as a centre or scrum-half, and coached at club level for Wigan.

== Background ==
Ted Toohey's birth was registered in Wigan, Lancashire, and his death aged 53 was registered in Wigan, Greater Manchester, England.

== Playing career ==
=== International honours ===
Toohey won caps for England while at Barrow in 1952 against Other Nationalities (2 matches), and won caps for Great Britain while at Barrow in 1952 against Australia (3 matches).

Ted Toohey also represented Great Britain while at Barrow between 1952 and 1956 against France (1 non-Test match).

==== Challenge Cup Final appearances ====
Ted Toohey played scrum-half in Barrow's 0–10 defeat by Wigan in the 1950–51 Challenge Cup Final during the 1950–51 season at Wembley Stadium, London on Saturday 5 May 1951, and played scrum-half in the 21–12 victory over Workington Town in the 1954–55 Challenge Cup Final during the 1954–55 season at Wembley Stadium, London on Saturday 30 April 1955, in front of a crowd of 66,513.

=== County Cup Final appearances ===
Ted Toohey played at centre and scored a try in Wigan's 3–7 defeat by Widnes in the 1945–46 Lancashire Cup Final during the 1945–46 season at Wilderspool Stadium, Warrington on Saturday 27 October 1945.

=== Club career ===
Toohey started his career with hometown club Wigan. He later moved to Barrow, where he formed a successful half-back partnership with stand-off Willie Horne. He also went on to play for Liverpool City.

== Coaching career ==
In 1961, Toohey brought his playing career to an end, and re-joined Wigan as a member of the coaching staff.
