= Ossie Peake =

England international rugby league footballer

Personal information
- Full name: Oswald Peake
- Born: 7 March 1920 Warrington, England
- Died: October 1997 (aged 77) Warrington, England

Playing information
- Position: Wing, Centre
Club
| Years | Team | Pld | T | G | FG | P |
|---|---|---|---|---|---|---|
| 1938–48 | Warrington | 118 | 48 | 0 | 0 | 144 |
| 1941–45 | → Huddersfield (guest) | 73 | 51 | 0 | 0 | 153 |
| 1949–50 | Widnes | 30 | 4 | 0 | 0 | 12 |
| | Total | 221 | 103 | 0 | 0 | 309 |
Representative
| Years | Team | Pld | T | G | FG | P |
| 1938 | Lancashire | 2 | 2 | 0 | 0 | 6 |
| 1939–41 | England | 3 | 0 | 0 | 0 | 0 |

Oswald Peake (7 March 1920 – October 1997) was an English professional rugby league footballer who played in the 1930s and 1940s. He played at representative level for England, and at club level for Warrington, Huddersfield (World War II guest) and Widnes, as a wing or centre.

== Background ==
Peake was born in Warrington, Lancashire, England, and attended Newton Grammar School. He died in October 1997, aged 77.

== Playing career ==
=== Challenge Cup Final appearances ===
Peake played on the wing in Huddersfield's 13–9 aggregate victory over Bradford Northern in the 1944–45 Challenge Cup Final during the 1944–45 season; the 7-4 victory in the first-leg at Fartown Ground, Huddersfield on Saturday 28 April 1945, and the 6-5 victory in the second-leg at Odsal Stadium, Bradford on Saturday 5 May 1945.

=== County Cup Final appearances ===
Peake played at centre in Warrington's 8-14 defeat by Wigan in the 1948 Lancashire Cup Final during the 1948–49 season at Station Road, Swinton on Saturday 13 November 1948.

=== Club career ===
Peake made his dêbut for Warrington on Saturday 2 April 1938, and he played his last match for Warrington on Saturday 13 November 1948.

=== International honours ===
While at Warrington, Peake won three caps for England. All three came in matches against Wales played between 1939 and 1941.
