= Johnny Hunter (rugby league) =

Australian rugby league footballer

Personal information
- Born: 21 July 1925; Kogarah, New South Wales, Sydney, Australia
- Died: 7 May 1980 (aged 54); England

Playing information
- Position: Fullback
Club
| Years | Team | Pld | T | G | FG | P |
|---|---|---|---|---|---|---|
| 1945–46 | Easts (Sydney) | 21 | 5 | 0 | 0 | 15 |
| 1947–57 | Huddersfield | 332 | 74 | 3 | | 228 |
| | Total | 353 | 79 | 3 | 0 | 243 |
Representative
| Years | Team | Pld | T | G | FG | P |
| 1949–52 | Other Nationalities | 8 | 0 | 1 | 0 | 2 |

Johnny Hunter (21 July 1925 – 7 May 1980) was an Australian rugby league footballer who played in the 1940s and 1950s. He played in Sydney's NSWRFL Premiership for the Eastern Suburbs club, with whom he won the 1945 NSWRFL Premiership, as well as in England for Huddersfield, with whom he won the 1953 Challenge Cup.

The 1945 NSWRFL season was Hunter's first, and at the end of it he played at centre in Eastern Suburbs' Premiership final victory. In January 1947 Hunter along with Eastern Suburbs teammate Lionel Cooper signed to play with English club Huddersfield.

Hunter scored 16-tries during the 1948–49 Northern Rugby Football League season, his first in England, breaking the record for a fullback set by Jim Sullivan. During the 1949–50 Northern Rugby Football League season Hunter played a fullback in Huddersfield's 2–20 defeat by Wigan in the Rugby Football League Championship Final at Maine Road, Manchester on Saturday 13 May 1950. During the 1952–53 season Hunter played at fullback in Huddersfield's 15–10 victory over St. Helens in the 1953 Challenge Cup Final during the 1952–53 season at Wembley Stadium, London on Saturday 25 April 1953, in front of a crowd of 89,588. having been stretchered from the field in the 63rd minute after a "stiff-arm" from St. Helens' winger Steve Llewellyn, he later returned to the field. During the 1952–53 season Hunter played at fullback in Huddersfield's 18–8 victory over Batley in the 1952 Yorkshire Cup Final at Headingley, Leeds on Saturday 15 November 1952. Also while in England, Hunter played eight matches for the Other Nationalities rugby league team, and one match for the British Empire. He continued playing for Huddersfield until 1955.

Hunter died in 1980.
