= Billy Derbyshire =

England international rugby league footballer

Personal information
- Full name: William Derbyshire
- Born: 26 August 1916
- Died: 16 January 1974 (aged 57)

Playing information
- Position: Prop
Club
Years	Team	Pld	T	G	FG	P
≤1947–47	Liverpool Stanley
1947–51	Warrington	165	17	0	0	51
	Total	165	17	0	0	51
Representative
Years	Team	Pld	T	G	FG	P
1947	England	1	0	0	0	0
1948	Lancashire	1	0	0	0	0

William Derbyshire (26 August 1916-16 January 1974) was an English professional rugby league footballer who played in the 1940s and 1950s. He played at representative level for England, and at club level for Liverpool Stanley and Warrington, as a prop.

== Playing career ==
=== International honours ===
Billy Derbyshire won a cap for England while at Warrington in 1947 against Wales.

=== Championship final appearances ===
Billy Derbyshire played at prop in Warrington's 15-5 victory over Bradford Northern in the Championship Final during the 1947–48 season at Maine Road, Manchester.

=== Challenge Final appearances ===
Billy Derbyshire played at prop in Warrington's 19-0 victory over Widnes in the 1949–50 Challenge Cup Final during the 1949–50 season at Wembley Stadium, London on Saturday 6 May 1950, in front of a crowd of 94,249

=== County Cup Final appearances ===
Billy Derbyshire played at prop in Warrington's 8-14 defeat by Wigan in the 1948–49 Lancashire Cup Final during the 1948–49 season at Station Road, Swinton on Saturday 13 November 1948, and played at prop in the 5-28 defeat by Wigan in the 1950–51 Lancashire Cup Final during the 1949–50 season at Station Road, Swinton on Saturday 4 November 1950.

=== Club career ===
Billy Derbyshire transferred from Liverpool Stanley to Warrington (alongside Bill Riley) prior to the 1947–48 season, he made his début for Warrington on Saturday 30 August 1947, and he played his last match for Warrington on Wednesday 29 August 1951.
