= Johnny Grice =

Australian rugby league player

Personal information
- Full name: Cecil John Grice
- Born: 3 December 1921
- Died: 25 April 2008 (aged 86)

Playing information
- Position: Halfback
Representative
Years	Team	Pld	T	G	FG	P
1945–46	Queensland	7	4	0	0	12
1946	Australia	2	0	0	0	0

Cecil John Grice (3 December 1921 – 25 April 2008) was an Australian rugby league player.

Originally from Ipswich, Grice was playing with Brisbane club Souths in 1946 when he received a call up to the Australia squad for their home series against Great Britain. He played halfback for Australia in the first two Test matches, forming a partnership with Pat Devery, then was replaced by Clem Kennedy for the series finale.

Grice joined Longreach as coach in 1947 and was that season's Central Western representative coach, before spending the next two years back in Ipswich, where he played for the C.E.Y.M.S. side. He then had stints coaching the Bucas club in Mackay and Mount Isa Brothers.
