= 1948–49 Lancashire Cup =

- Structure: Regional knockout championship
- Teams: 14
- Winners: Wigan
- Runners-up: Warrington

The 1948–49 Lancashire Cup was the thirty-sixth occasion on which the Lancashire Cup competition had been held. Wigan won the trophy by beating Warrington by the score of 14–8. The match was played at Station Road, Pendlebury, (historically in the county of Lancashire). The attendance was a record-breaking 39,015, over 5,500 more than the previous record, and receipts were £5,518, another record. This was the third of Wigan's record-breaking run of six consecutive Lancashire Cup victories.

== Background ==
Overall, the number of teams entering this year's competition remained the same as last year's 14 with a further invitation to Lancashire Amateurs (a junior/amateur club). The same pre-war fixture format was retained. This season saw no bye but one "blank" or "dummy" fixture in the first round. There was also one bye but no "blank" fixture" in the second round. As last season, all the first round matches of the competition will be played on the basis of two legged, home and away, ties. However this year, the second round becomes a straightforward knock-out basis.

== Competition and results ==
=== Round 1 ===
Involved 7 matches (with no bye and one "blank" fixture) and 14 clubs

Game No	Fixture date	Home team	Score		Away team	Venue	agg	Att	Rec	Notes	Ref
1	Sat 04 Sep 1948	Leigh	37–2		Liverpool Stanley	Kirkhall Lane					
2	Sat 04 Sep 1948	Oldham	8–7		Widnes	Watersheddings					
3	Sat 04 Sep 1948	Rochdale Hornets	5–13		Belle Vue Rangers	Athletic Grounds					
4	Sat 04 Sep 1948	St. Helens	9–24		Wigan	Knowsley Road		25,000			
5	Sat 04 Sep 1948	Swinton	26–10		Lancashire Amateurs	Station Road				1	
6	Sat 04 Sep 1948	Warrington	30–8		Barrow	Wilderspool					
7	Sat 04 Sep 1948	Workington Town	7–5		Salford	Borough Park					
8	blank			blank							

=== Round 1 – second leg ===
Involved 7 matches (with no bye and one "blank" fixture) and 14 clubs. These are the reverse fixture from the first leg

Game No	Fixture date	Home team	Score	Away team	Venue	agg	Att	Rec	Notes	Ref
1	Tue 07 Sep 1948	Liverpool Stanley	2–46	Leigh	Stanley Greyhound Stadium	4–83				
2	Thu 09 Sep 1948	Widnes	5–5	Oldham	Naughton Park	12–13				
3	Mon 06 Sep 1948	Belle Vue Rangers	6–5	Rochdale Hornets	Belle Vue Stadium	19–10				
4	Wed 08 Sep 1948	Wigan	8–7	St. Helens	Central Park	32–16	18,000			
5	Mon 13 Sep 1948	Lancashire Amateurs	4–11	Swinton	Kirkhall Lane	14–37			2	
6	Thu 09 Sep 1948	Barrow	4–7	Warrington	Craven Park	12–37				
7	Wed 08 Sep 1948	Salford	14–0	Workington Town	The Willows	19–7				
8		blank		blank						

=== Round 2 – quarterfinals ===
Involved 3 matches (with one bye) and 7 clubs

Game No	Fixture date	Home team	Score	Away team	Venue	agg	Att	Rec	Notes	Ref
1	Thu 16 Sep 1948	Leigh	10–15	Warrington	Kirkhall Lane					
2	Wed 29 Sep 1948	Salford	5–18	Wigan	The Willows					
3	Thu 30 Sep 1948	Belle Vue Rangers	14–4	Swinton	Belle Vue Stadium					
4		Oldham		bye						

=== Round 3 – semifinals ===
Involved 2 matches and 4 clubs

Game No	Fixture date	Home team	Score	Away team	Venue	agg	Att	Rec	Notes	Ref
1	Tue 28 Sep 1948	Warrington	55–0	Oldham	Wilderspool					
2	Mon 04 Oct 1948	Wigan	22–9	Belle Vue Rangers	Central Park					

=== Final ===
Game No	Fixture date	Home team	Score	Away team	Venue	agg	Att	Rec	Notes	Ref
	Saturday 13 November 1948	Wigan	14–8	Warrington	Station Road		39,015	£5,518	3 4	

==== Teams and scorers ====
Wigan	No.	Warrington
	teams	
Martin Ryan	1	Les Jones
Gordon Ratcliffe	2	Brian Bevan
Ted Ward	3	Albert Pimblett
Ernie Ashcroft	4	Ossie Peake
John Lawrenson	5	Albert Johnson
Ces Mountford	6	Jack Fleming
Johnny Alty	7	Gerry Helme
Ken Gee	8	Bill Derbyshire
Joe Egan	9	Dave Cotton
Frank Barton	10	Billy Riley
Nat Silcock, Jr.	11	Jim Featherstone
Billy Blan	12	Harry Bath
Bill Hudson	13	Harold Palin
14	score	8
12	HT	5
	Scorers	
	Tries	
Gordon Ratcliffe (1)	T	Albert Johnson (1)
Ted Ward (1)	T	Brian Bevan (1)
	Goals	
Ted Ward (4)	G	Harold Palin (1)
Referee		S. Adams, (Hull)

Scoring – Try = three (3) points – Goal = two (2) points – Drop goal = two (2) points

=== The road to success ===
All the first round ties were played on a two leg (home and away) basis.

The first club named in each of the first round ties played the first leg at home.

the scores shown in the first round are the aggregate score over the two legs.

First round
Workington Town	7
Salford	19
St. Helens	16
Wigan	32
Rochdale Hornets	10
Belle Vue Rangers	19
Swinton	37
Lancashire Amateurs	14
Leigh	83
Liverpool Stanley	4
Warrington	37
Barrow	12
Oldham	13
Widnes	12
blank
blank

Second round
Salford	5
Wigan	18
Belle Vue Rangers	14
Swinton	4
Leigh	10
Warrington	15
Oldham
bye

Semifinals
Wigan	22
Belle Vue Rangers	9
Warrington	55
Oldham	0

Final
Wigan	14
Warrington	8

== Notes and comments ==
Lancashire Amateurs were a junior (or amateur) club from Lancashire. The match was played at Kirkhall Lane, Leigh.

Station Road was the home ground of Swinton from 1929 to 1932 and at its peak was one of the finest rugby league grounds in the country and it boasted a capacity of 60,000. The actual record attendance was for the Challenge Cup semi-final on 7 April 1951 when 44,621 watched Wigan beat Warrington 3–2.

The attendance was a record-breaking 39,015, over 5,500 more than the previous record, set in 1934, and receipts were £5518-0-0, another record.

== See also ==
- 1948–49 Northern Rugby Football League season
- Rugby league county cups
