= Bryn Knowelden =

English rugby league footballer (1919–2010)

Personal information
- Full name: Ronald Brindle Knowelden
- Born: 27 June 1919 Barrow-in-Furness, Lancashire, England
- Died: 16 April 2010 (aged 90) Blackpool, Lancashire, England

Playing information
- Position: Wing, Centre, Stand-off
Club
Years	Team	Pld	T	G	FG	P
1944–47	Barrow	103	43			129
1947–51	Warrington	125	37	0	0	111
1952–55	Hull Kingston Rovers	66	10	0	0	30
	Total	294	90	0	0	270
Representative
Years	Team	Pld	T	G	FG	P
1944–47	England	3	1	0	0	3
1946	Lancashire	1	1	0	0	3
1946	Great Britain	1	0	0	0	0

Coaching information
Club
Years	Team	Gms	W	D	L	W%
1952–55	Hull Kingston Rovers
Association football career
Senior career*
Years	Team	Apps	(Gls)
- Morecambe
- Liverpool (reserves)
- * Club domestic league appearances and goals

Ronald Brindle Knowelden (27 June 1919 – 16 April 2010) was an English professional rugby league and association football (soccer) footballer who played in the 1940s and 1950s, and coached rugby league in the 1950s. He played at representative level for Great Britain and England, and at club level for Barrow, Warrington (captain), and Hull Kingston Rovers, as a wing, centre or stand-off, and coached at club level for Hull Kingston Rovers. He also played association football (soccer) for Morecambe and Liverpool (reserves).

== Background ==
Bryn Knowelden was born in Barrow-in-Furness, Lancashire, England, he was a pupil of Dowdales School, after retiring from rugby league, he ran a newsagent in Cadishead, before retiring to Blackpool, and he died aged 90 in Blackpool, Lancashire, England.

== Playing career ==
=== International honours ===
Bryn Knowelden won caps for England while at Barrow in 1944 against Wales, in 1945 against Wales, in 1947 against France, and won a cap for Great Britain while at Barrow in 1946 against New Zealand.

=== Championship final appearances ===
Bryn Knowelden played at centre in Warrington's 15–5 victory over Bradford Northern in the Championship Final during the 1947–48 season at Maine Road, Manchester on Saturday 8 May 1948, played in the 12–13 defeat by Huddersfield in the Championship Final during the 1948–49 season at Maine Road, Manchester on Saturday 14 May 1949, and played, and was captain in the 11–26 defeat by Workington Town in the Championship Final during the 1950–51 season at Maine Road, Manchester on Saturday 12 May 1951.

=== Challenge Cup Final appearances ===
Bryn Knowelden played stand-off, and scored a try in Warrington's 19–0 victory over Widnes in the 1949–50 Challenge Cup Final during the 1949–50 season at Wembley Stadium, London on Saturday 6 May 1950, in front of a crowd of 94,249.

=== County Cup Final appearances ===
Bryn Knowelden played stand-off in Warrington's 5–28 defeat by Wigan in the 1950–51 Lancashire Cup Final during the 1950–51 season at Station Road, Swinton on Saturday 4 November 1950.

=== Club career ===
During December 1947, Bryn Knowelden was transferred from Barrow to Warrington for £1,500 (based on increases in average earnings, this would be approximately £204,000 in 2025). He made his début for Warrington on Saturday 13 December 1947, and he played his last match for Warrington on Saturday 29 September 1951.
