= Souths Logan Magpies =

Australian rugby league club, based in Brisbane QLD

Club information
- Full name: Souths Logan Magpies Rugby League Football Club
- Nickname(s): Magpies, Souths
- Colours: Primary: White; Black; Secondary: Blue; Yellow
- Founded: Carltons (1918; 108 years ago), Southern Suburbs Districts (1933; 93 years ago), Souths Logan Magpies (2003; 23 years ago)
- Website: www.southsloganmagpies.com.au

Current details
- Ground: Davies Park, West End, Queensland
- CEO: Steven Bretherton
- Coach: Karmichael Hunt
- Captain: Rory Ferguson
- Competition: Hostplus Cup, Brisbane Rugby League
- 2023: 2nd
- Current season

Records
- Premierships: 10 (1913, 1921, 1925, 1930, 1945, 1949, 1951, 1953, 1981, 1985)
- Runners-up: 11 (1909, 1912, 1914, 1928, 1942, 1947, 1963, 1979, 1980, 1982, 1984)
- Minor premierships: 10 (1921, 1928, 1930, 1949, 1951, 1953, 1954, 1981, 1985, 1988)
- Wooden spoons: 14 (1926, 1933, 1934, 1935, 1936, 1937, 1941, 1958, 1959, 1960, 1965, 1968, 1969, 1977)
- Premierships (2nd grade): 12 (1924, 1929, 1931, 1932, 1939, 1945, 1946, 1961, 1980, 1983, 1984, 2008)
- Runners-up (2nd grade): 2 (1996, 2010)
- Wooden spoons (2nd grade): 4 (1999, 2001, 2012, 2022)

The Souths Logan Magpies, more commonly referred to by their former names Southern Suburbs Magpies, or South Brisbane Magpies, or often simply referred to as Souths, are a rugby league football club based in the southern suburbs of Brisbane, Australia. They play in the Hostplus Cup, and although officially are a newer club (having been formed in 2003), they have roots tracing back (as Souths Magpies) to as early as 1909, the first year of rugby league in Queensland.

== History ==
=== Queensland Rugby League ===
The first rugby league club to represent the southern side of the Brisbane River was West End, who entered the Queensland Rugby League premiership in 1910. Playing in an all black strip, the club won the 1913 premiership against Natives 5–3 in a low scoring game, and were runners-up to Valleys the following year, going down by 18–8. The West End Club played their last season in the Senior Grade in 1920.

The Carlton Football Club was founded in 1918 as a Junior Grade (Reserve Grade) Club to compete in the QRL competition. The club was founded by members of the Brothers Old Boys Junior Division (modern day Reserve Graders) along the same lines of the Merthyr Football Club Senior Division (modern day "A" Graders) in 1917. The members wanted to stay together and play football and since the QRU had abandoned Senior Football, they saw this as their only option.

When the QRU Senior Grade competitions recommenced in 1919 the vast majority of the members of both the Merthyr and Carlton Clubs returned to play with the Brothers Club; however, a number of members decided to stay with the League Game and the name and colours of the Carlton Football remained with the QRL. The Carlton Club was also promoted to the Senior Grade of the QRL Competition.

Carltons wore maroon and white jerseys, were a relatively successful club, winning the competition in 1921 (vs. Coorparoo 12–10), 1925 (vs. Coorparoo 24–5) and 1930 (vs. Valleys 19–8).

=== Brisbane Rugby League ===
Following the introduction of District Football in 1933 by the Brisbane Rugby League, Carltons were forced to relinquish their identity and as a result became known as Southern Suburbs. Souths inherited a debt of 90 pounds, and also suffered an exodus of players, resulting in doubts over their ability to field a first-grade team. However, newly elected President Jack Adams started the club with regular meetings under his West End clothing factory, which also made the club's first jerseys free of charge.

During World War II, a lack of dyes for clothing forced the club to change jerseys, a problem that faced many clubs throughout Australia. Souths adopted the old West End jersey, and after the war chose to keep the design, and added a white V. (Southern Suburbs were known as the Lions up to the late-fifties, it was in the early sixties that they took on the Magpie logo) The war also saw them leave their spiritual home of Davies Park, which was first used in 1910, as it was used as housing for American servicemen in the city. Although they had an acute shortage of players, they continued to field teams, playing and training out of Musgrave Park in South Brisbane.

Souths made their first grand final in 1942, however went down to Brothers 20–11. In 1945 they broke their premiership drought in most emphatic fashion, becoming the first club to clean-sweep the BRL in first, reserve and third grades. They also won two junior premierships in that same year. This was followed with more premierships in 1949, 1951 and 1953. Bill Tyquin, a product of Souths district, was captain-coach of the 1949 team, and went on to become an outstanding administrator and President of the club, as well as a delegate to the Brisbane Rugby League. As a tribute, the Bill Tyquin Oval at Davies Park was named after him.

The early 1970s saw the club in the doldrums of the league, as well as facing severe financial problems by the middle of the decade. However, shrewd management and hard work saw an on-field revival, led by coach Wayne Bennett, resulting in the club making the 1979 Grand Final, although they were beaten 26-0 by Valleys. Bob McCarthy took over as coach in 1980, and guided the Magpies to another Grand Final loss, this time against underdogs Norths 17–15. But all would be forgotten in the euphoria of winning the 1981 title by defeating Redcliffe in the grand final with a spectacular try on the last play of the match.

The late 1970s and early 1980s saw Souths produce players such as Peter Jackson, Gary Belcher, and a young Brisbane Policeman who would go on to have a career as both a player and later a coach, Mal Meninga.

In the 1985 Brisbane Rugby League grand final, the Wayne Bennett-coached Souths side got a shock 10–8 win over Wally Lewis's Wynnum-Manly Seagulls, with John Elias being named man-of-the-match.

Between 1979 and 1985, Souths played in every BRL Grand Final at Lang Park other than 1983, almost dominating the league. The Magpies won two of the six Grand Finals they played during this period (1981 and 1985) while losing in 1979 (Valleys), 1980 (Norths), 1982 and 1984 to Wynnum Manly.

=== Queensland Cup ===
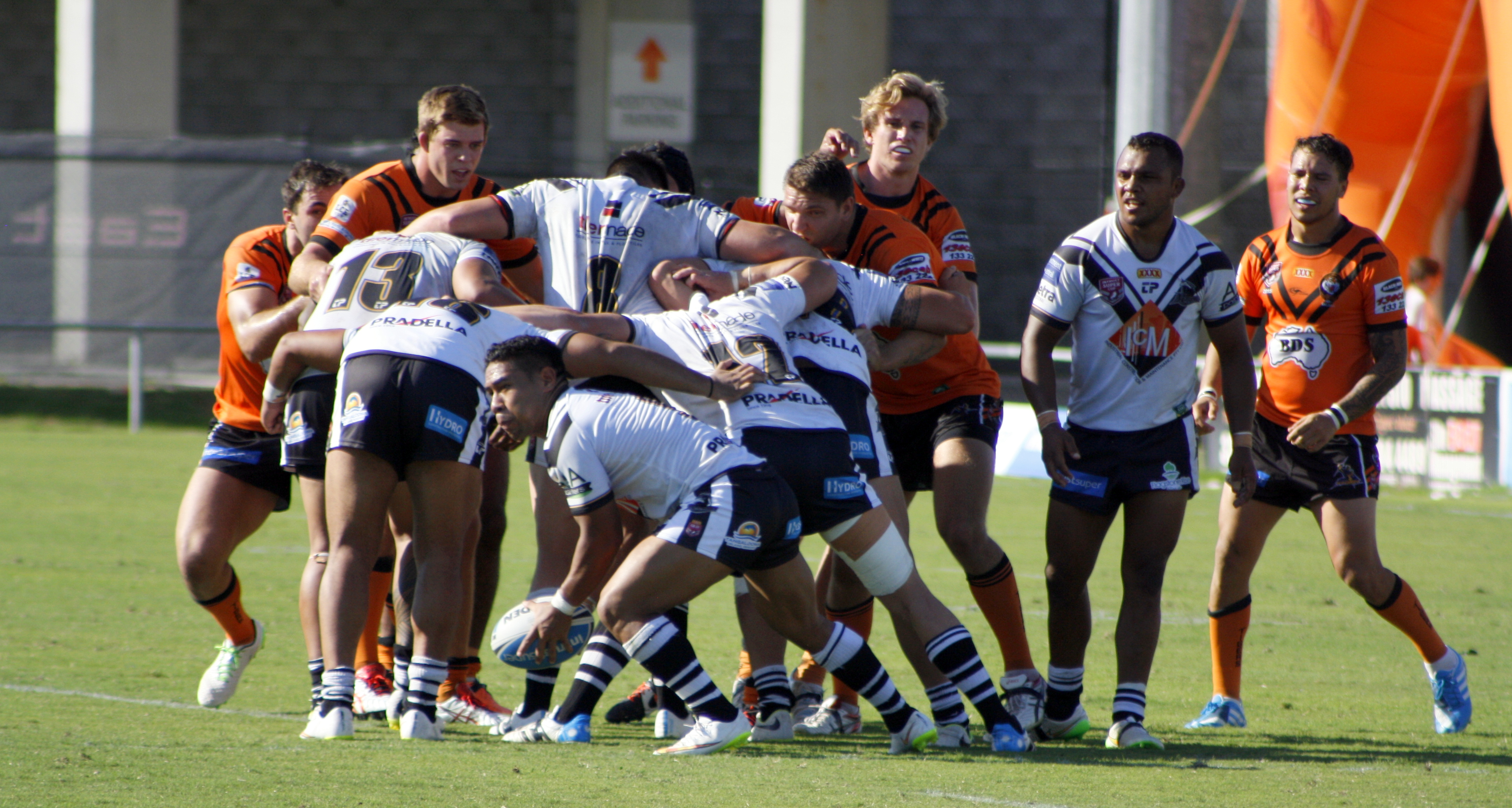
Easts Tigers versus Souths Logan Magpies at Langlands Park, Brisbane Australia. 5 April 2015.

In 2002, it was widely speculated that Souths (again in deep financial trouble) would merge with the financially stricken Logan Scorpions, who had recently won the wooden spoon in what was their final season in the Queensland Cup. However, the merger did not eventuate with Souths acquiring the Logan club, renaming themselves Souths-Logan. In 2008 they won their first Queensland Cup premiership.

== Crest and colours ==
The Magpie crest, now synonymous with Brisbane Southern Suburbs, as it is shared by both Souths rugby league and rugby union, was formally adopted in 1968, after having the Magpies nickname for decades. By the second half of 20th century, however, Souths played in a predominantly white strip with two black Vs – one thick and one thin. During the Carltons years, and up until the forced change to a black jersey, the club wore cherry and white – now synonymous with the Redcliffe Dolphins.

When Souths became Souths-Logan, they incorporated the blue and gold of Logan into their jersey design between the two Vs on club jersey. The lime green of the Canberra Raiders was added in 2004 to recognise their involvement with the club. Since cutting ties with the Raiders in 2014, the club has reverted to a predominately white and black colour scheme, with blue and gold as secondary colours.

== Home ground ==
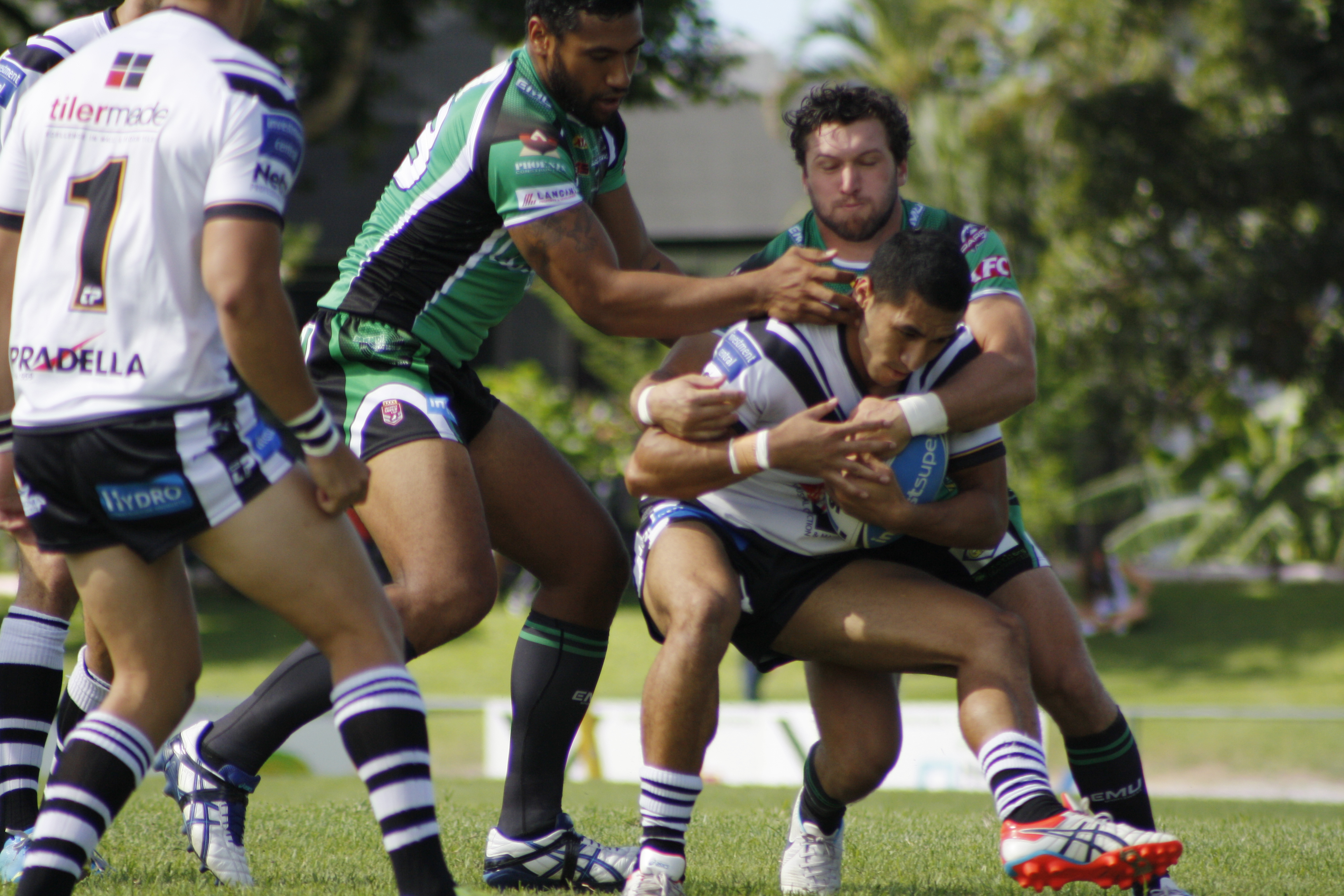
Souths vs Townsville, Intrust Super Cup, Davies Park

Their home ground is traditionally Davies Park in Brisbane's West End, but they played all their 2006 home games out of Brandon Park, the junior club, located in Acacia Ridge. The Magpies moved back to Davies Park again in 2007.

Traditionally, the Magpies home ground is Davies Park, although they did spend a time at Musgrave Park during World War II. Following the take-over of Logan Scorpions in 2003 the club split its home games between Davies Park and Logan's Meakin Park in Slacks Creek, although they had moved full-time to Davies Park by the end of the year. In 2004 all games were moved to Davies Park. In late 2005 the Magpies began moving matches to Brandon Park in Acacia Ridge, just opposite the Archerfield Airport, to be nearer Souths Juniors. In 2006 all games were played at Brandon Park. 2007 saw 6 of the 10 games back at Davies Park, with the remaining 4 at Brandon Park.

Players who have worn the jerseys of South Brisbane 1908 to 1913, West End 1913 to 1926, Carlton 1926 to 1933, Souths 1933 onwards and represented their state totalled 80 of whom 33 represented Australia. The first player was Herb Brackenreg in 1909 to represent Australia. Other Souths players to represent Australia were: H. Fewin 1920, Vic Anderson, 1909 John Grant, Jim Murphy, Wayne Bennett, Ray Higgs, Brad Tessmann, John Grice, Bob Nicholson 1909, Len Pegg, Alan Hornery, Frank Drake, Alan Gil, Reg Kay, Alan Thompson, Henry Holloway, Claud O'Donnell, Greg Veivers (Captain), (Greg's Father Jack represented Queensland), Mick Veivers, Neville Broadfoot, Dave Brown, Bill Tyquin (Captain), Tom Tyquin, Peter Jackson, Harold 'Mick' Crocker, Elton Rasmussen, Lew Platz, Gary Belcher, Jason Smith, Bob Lindner, Mal Meninga (Captain) William (Bill) Heidke 1908/9 Kangaroo tour.

== Notable players ==
=== International representatives ===
Australia

- (Australia) Bill Heidke
- (Australia) Harold Crocker
- (Australia) Peter Jackson
- (Australia) Frank Drake
- (Australia) Harry Fewin
- (Australia) John Grant
- (Australia) John Grice
- (Australia) Alan Hornery
- (Australia) Mal Meninga
- (Australia) Jim Murphy
- (Australia) Claud O'Donnell
- (Australia) Len Pegg
- (Australia) Brad Tessmann
- (Australia) Alan Thompson
- (Australia) Bill Tyquin
- (Australia) Tom Tyquin
- (Australia) Greg Veivers
- (Australia) Mick Veivers
- (Australia) Bob Lindner
- (Australia) Gary Belcher

Chris Phelan

Papua New Guinea

- (Papua New Guinea) Joshua Damen

Samoa

- (Samoa) Anthony Milford
- (Samoa) Ricky Leutele

Wales

- (Wales) Ollie Olds

=== Queensland (state of origin) ===
- (Queensland) Bruce Astill
- (Queensland) Mitch Brennan
- (Queensland) Peter Jackson
- (Queensland) Bob Lindner
- (Queensland) Mal Meninga
- (Queensland) Chris Phelan
- (Queensland) Brad Tessmann
- (Queensland) Gary Belcher
- (Queensland) Norm Carr
- (Queensland) Anthony Milford

=== Queensland (residents) ===
Kyle Lodge Brett Kelly

- Bob Blair
- Michael Davis
- Peter Deaves
- Phil Dennis
- Craig Grauf
- Chris Hastings
- Tahi Reihana
- Jace Van Dijk
- Brent Vincent
- Matthew Pitman
- Lane Herbert

=== Team of the century ===
In 2008, the centennial year of rugby league in Australia, the Souths Logan Magpies named their 17-man team of the century.

== Ladder Positions ==
- 1996 – 3rd
- 1997 – 11th
- 1998 – 14th
- 1999 – 12th (last)
- 2000 – 9th
- 2001 – 11th (last)
- 2002 – 11th
- 2003 – 11th
- 2004 – 11th
- 2005 – 10th
- 2006 - 10th
- 2007 – 10th
- 2008 – 2nd (Grand Final winners)
- 2009 – 1st
- 2010 – 1st
- 2011 – 3rd
- 2012 – 12th (last)
- 2013 – 9th
- 2014 – 10th
- 2015 – 12th
- 2016 – 7th
- 2017 – 5th
- 2018 – 9th
- 2019 – 10th
- 2020 – COVID (Competition cancelled)
- 2021 – 6th
- 2022 – 14th (last)
- 2023 – 2nd
- 2024 – 10th

== See also ==
- National Rugby League reserves affiliations
