= Noel White (rugby league) =

Australian rugby league footballer (1923–2019)

Terence 'Noel' White
Personal information
- Born: 30 December 1923 Kurri Kurri, New South Wales, Australia
- Died: 20 June 2019 (aged 95) Nelson Bay, New South Wales

Playing information
- Position: Wing
Club
Years	Team	Pld	T	G	FG	P
19??–46	Kurri Kurri
1947–??	Wests (Brisbane)
	Total	0	0	0	0	0
Representative
Years	Team	Pld	T	G	FG	P
1945–46	Country NSW	2	2	0	0	6
1945–46	New South Wales	5	4	0	0	12
1946	Australia	1	0	0	0	0
1947	Queensland	4	2	0	0	6

Terence 'Noel' White (30 December 1923 – 20 June 2019) was an Australian rugby league footballer. He was one of only seven players to have represented New South Wales, Queensland and Australia in a 12-month period. At the time of his death, he was Australia's oldest member of the Australia national rugby league team, being the last surviving member of Australia's 1946 team that played England for The Ashes in Australia.

White was a winger who was a noted sprinter. He played club football in New South Wales for the Kurri Kurri Bulldogs, in Brisbane for Wests Panthers and in Townsville for Centrals ASA. In 1947 he captain-coached Centrals to their third Townsville first grade premiership.

He represented Country and NSW teams in 1945-46 before being chosen to play for Australia during the 1946 Great Britain Lions tour, appearing in the 3td Test match loss to the visitors. After moving to Townsville in 1947, he represented Queensland in four interstate matches against NSW before a serious knee injury forced him into retirement before the Kangaroos tour in 1948.

In 2010 White was named on the wing in Kurri Rugby League Club's Team of the Century, having played in the 1945 Grand Final-winning team.
