= Bill Davies (rugby league) =

Wales international rugby league footballer

Personal information
- Full name: William T. Davies
- Born: Wales
- Died: unknown

Playing information

Rugby union
Club
Years	Team	Pld	T	G	FG	P
	Neath RFC

Rugby league
- Position: Fullback, Centre, Stand-off
Club
Years	Team	Pld	T	G	FG	P
1939–47	Huddersfield
1947–??	Dewsbury
	Total	0	0	0	0	0
Representative
Years	Team	Pld	T	G	FG	P
1943–47	Wales	6
1944	Army XIII	0	0	0	0	0

Bill Davies (birth unknown – death unknown) was a Welsh rugby union and rugby league footballer who played in the 1940s. He played at representative level for Wales, and at club level for Huddersfield, as a fullback, centre, or stand-off.

Davies started his career as a rugby union player at Neath RFC. In 1939, he switched codes from rugby union to rugby league when he joined Huddersfield.

Davies played Centre in Huddersfield's 4–13 defeat by Wigan in the Championship Final during the 1945–46 season at Maine Road, Manchester on Saturday 18 May 1946.

In the first full season after the war, a new record transfer fee of £1,650 was set when Dewsbury bought Davies from Huddersfield, (based on increases in average earnings, this would be approximately £235,500 in 2014).

Bill Davies won 6 caps for Wales in 1943–1947 while at Huddersfield.

Achievements
Preceded by ??	Rugby League Transfer Record; Huddersfield to Dewsbury; 1947	Succeeded by Bill Hudson
