= Phil Jackson (rugby league, born 1932) =

English rugby league footballer (1932–2022)

Personal information
- Full name: Philip Jackson
- Born: 9 June 1932 Montreal, Canada
- Died: 20 July 2022 (aged 90)

Playing information
- Position: Centre, stand-off
Club
Years	Team	Pld	T	G	FG	P
1950–59	Barrow	225	89	0	0	356
Representative
Years	Team	Pld	T	G	FG	P
1951–57	Lancashire	2	1	0	0	3
1952–58	Great Britain	29	9	0	0	27
1955	England	1	0	0	0	0

Philip Jackson (9 June 1932 – 20 July 2022) was an English World Cup winning former professional rugby league footballer who played in the 1950s and 1960s. He was a captain, playing as a centre, or stand-off, as well as a Barrow club legend.

With Barrow, where he was known as the 'Prince Among Centres', he played in three Challenge Cup finals in the 1950s. Jackson won 27 Great Britain caps, played in the 1954 and 1957 Rugby League World Cups and twice toured Australasia with the Lions.

He was inducted into the Barrow Hall of Fame when it was launched in 2001 alongside 1950s teammates Willie Horne and Jimmy Lewthwaite.

== Early life ==
Jackson was born in Canada but moved to Barrow-in-Furness, England, with his parents at the age of three. He played rugby league at school but his first senior rugby experience came in rugby union after he took up an apprenticeship at a shipyard. He switched to rugby league when he was offered professional terms by Barrow in 1950 at the age of 18.

== Playing career ==
=== International honours ===
Phil Jackson represented Great Britain while at Barrow between 1952 and 1956 against France (2 non-Test matches). He also won one cap for England v Other Nationalities on 12 September 1955 as part of the 1955-56 European Rugby League Championship, played at Central Park, Wigan.

=== Challenge Cup Final appearances ===
Phil Jackson played right-centre in Barrow's 0–10 defeat by Wigan in the 1950–51 Challenge Cup Final during the 1950–51 season at Wembley Stadium, London on Saturday 5 May 1951, played right-centre in the 21–12 victory over Workington Town in the 1954–55 Challenge Cup Final during the 1954–55 season at Wembley Stadium, London on Saturday 30 April 1955, in front of a crowd of 66,513, and played right-centre, and scored a try in the 7–9 defeat by Leeds in the 1956–57 Challenge Cup Final during the 1956–57 season at Wembley Stadium, London on Saturday 11 May 1957, in front of a crowd of 76,318.

=== County Cup Final appearances ===
Phil Jackson played right-centre in Barrow's 12–2 victory over Oldham in the 1954–55 Lancashire Cup Final during the 1954–55 season at Station Road, Swinton on Saturday 23 October 1954.

== Coaching career ==
Injury forced him to retire in 1959 but in 1960 he moved to Australia and was tempted back into playing by the Goulburn Workers Club in New South Wales. In the role as player coach, he led the club to a Group 8 premiership. The club was also awarded the Clayton Cup for being the best performed team in country New South Wales in 1960. He continued coaching after retiring as a player and eventually settled in Wagga Wagga.
