= Peter Ramsden (rugby league) =

English rugby league footballer

Personal information
- Born: 9 May 1934; Huddersfield, England
- Died: 1 September 2002 (aged 68); York, England

Playing information
- Height: 5 ft 8 in (1.73 m)
- Weight: 14 st 0 lb (89 kg)
- Position: Centre, Stand-off, Loose forward
Club
Years	Team	Pld	T	G	FG	P
1951–64	Huddersfield	246	54	2		146
1964–65	York	26
	Total	272	54	2	0	146

Peter Ramsden (9 May 1934 – 1 September 2002) was an English professional rugby league footballer who played in the 1950s and 1960s. He played at club level for Huddersfield and York, as a centre, stand-off or loose forward.

== Background ==
Peter Ramsden was born in Huddersfield, West Riding of Yorkshire, England, and he died aged 68 in York, North Yorkshire, England.

== Playing career ==
=== Challenge Cup Final appearances ===
Peter Ramsden played stand-off, broke his nose after six minutes, scored two tries, and won the Lance Todd Trophy in Huddersfield's 15-10 victory over St. Helens in the 1952–53 Challenge Cup Final during the 1952–53 season at Wembley Stadium, London on Saturday 25 April 1953, in front of a crowd of 89,588, and played in the 6-12 defeat by Wakefield Trinity in the 1961–62 Challenge Cup Final during the 1961–62 season at Wembley Stadium, London on Saturday 12 May 1962, in front of a crowd of 81,263.

=== Lance Todd Trophy ===
Peter Ramsden is the youngest player ever to win the Lance Todd Trophy, aged 19 in the 1952–53 Challenge Cup Final during the 1952–53 season.

=== County Cup Final appearances ===
Peter Ramsden played at centre in the 18-8 victory over Batley in the 1952–53 Yorkshire Cup Final during the 1952–53 season at Headingley, Leeds on Saturday 15 November 1952, and played stand-off in the 15-8 victory over York in the 1957–58 Yorkshire Cup Final during the 1957–58 season at Headingley, Leeds on Saturday 19 October 1957.

=== Testimonial match ===
Peter Ramsden's Testimonial match at Huddersfield took place in 1961.
