= 1950–51 Challenge Cup =

Rugby league competition

- Duration: 5 rounds
- Number of teams: 32
- Highest attendance: 94,262
- Winners: Wigan
- Runners-up: Barrow
- Lance Todd Trophy: Cec Mountford

The 1950–51 Challenge Cup was the 50th staging of rugby league's oldest knockout competition, the Challenge Cup.

The final was contested by Wigan and Barrow at Wembley Stadium in London.

The final was played on Saturday 5 May 1951, where Wigan beat Barrow 10–0 in front of a crowd of 94,262.

== First round ==
Date	Team one	Score one	Team two	Score two
10 Feb	Batley	41	Broughton Moor	3
10 Feb	Belle Vue Rangers	8	Castleford	5
10 Feb	Bradford Northern	11	St Helens	6
10 Feb	Featherstone Rovers	9	York	5
10 Feb	Halifax	17	Hunslet	4
10 Feb	Hull Kingston Rovers	7	Dewsbury	13
10 Feb	Leeds	23	Oldham	5
10 Feb	Leigh	43	Latchford Albion	0
10 Feb	Liverpool	5	Workington Town	25
10 Feb	Llanelli	9	Barrow	23
10 Feb	Rochdale Hornets	0	Wigan	32
10 Feb	Salford	16	Wakefield Trinity	10
10 Feb	Swinton	25	Bramley	4
10 Feb	Warrington	25	Hull FC	9
10 Feb	Whitehaven	2	Huddersfield	7
10 Feb	Widnes	8	Keighley	3
17 Feb	Barrow	39	Llanelli	5
17 Feb	Bramley	7	Swinton	14
17 Feb	Broughton Moor	0	Batley	36
17 Feb	Castleford	2	Belle Vue Rangers	5
17 Feb	Dewsbury	19	Hull Kingston Rovers	3
17 Feb	Huddersfield	21	Whitehaven	9
17 Feb	Hull FC	3	Warrington	5
17 Feb	Hunslet	2	Halifax	0
17 Feb	Keighley	6	Widnes	0
17 Feb	Latchford Albion	0	Leigh	19
17 Feb	Oldham	13	Leeds	10
17 Feb	St Helens	4	Bradford Northern	0
17 Feb	Wakefield Trinity	2	Salford	6
17 Feb	Wigan	18	Rochdale Hornets	5
17 Feb	Workington Town	28	Liverpool	8
17 Feb	York	5	Featherstone Rovers	4

== Second round ==
Date	Team one	Score one	Team two	Score two
03 Mar	Barrow	12	Workington Town	5
03 Mar	Belle Vue Rangers	12	Huddersfield	14
03 Mar	Bradford Northern	14	Swinton	4
03 Mar	Keighley	6	Halifax	7
03 Mar	Leeds	20	Leigh	3
03 Mar	Salford	6	Dewsbury	0
03 Mar	Warrington	18	Featherstone Rovers	6
03 Mar	Wigan	16	Batley	8

== Quarterfinals ==
Date	Team one	Score one	Team two	Score two
17 Mar	Barrow	5	Bradford Northern	4
17 Mar	Leeds	15	Halifax	7
17 Mar	Salford	4	Warrington	8
17 Mar	Wigan	2	Huddersfield	0

== Semifinals ==
Date	Team one	Score one	Team two	Score two
07 Apr	Leeds	14	Barrow	14
07 Apr	Wigan	3	Warrington	2
11 Apr	Leeds	13	Barrow	28

== Final ==
5 May 1951

Wigan	10 – 0	Barrow
Try: Hilton, Gee; Goal: Gee, Mountford	Report

Wembley Stadium, London
Attendance: 94,262
Referee: M. Coates (Pudsey)
Player of the Match: Cec Mountford

FB	1	Jack Cunliffe
RW	2	Jack Hilton
RC	3	Jack Broome
LC	4	George Roughley
LW	5	Brian Nordgren
SO	6	Cec Mountford
SH	7	Tommy Bradshaw
PR	8	Ken Gee
HK	9	George Curran
PR	10	Frank Barton
SR	11	Nat Silcock
SR	12	Ted Slevin
LF	13	Billy Blan
Coach:
Jim Sullivan

FB	1	Harry Stretch
RW	2	Jimmy Lewthwaite
RC	3	Phil Jackson
LC	4	Dennis Goodwin
LW	5	Frank Castle
SO	6	Willie Horne
SH	7	Ted Toohey
PR	8	Frank Longman
HK	9	Jack McKinnell
PR	10	Ralph Hartley
SR	11	Jack Grundy
SR	12	Harry Atkinson
LF	13	Hughie McGregor
Coach:
