= 1952–53 Yorkshire Cup =

- Structure: Regional knockout championship
- Teams: 16
- Winners: Huddersfield
- Runners-up: Batley

The 1952–53 Yorkshire Cup was the forty-fifth occasion on which the Yorkshire Cup competition had been held.

Huddersfield won the trophy by beating Batley by the score of 18–8

The match was played at Headingley, Leeds, now in West Yorkshire. The attendance was 15,500 and receipts were £2,471

This was Huddersfield's second appearance in the Yorkshire Cup final in the last three years, winning in 1950

== Background ==
This season there were no junior/amateur clubs invited, no new entrants and no club "dropped out", and so the number of entrants remained at the same as last season's total number of sixteen.

This in turn resulted in no byes in the first round.

The competition again followed the original formula of a knock-out tournament, with the exception of the first round which was still played on a two-legged home and away basis.

== Competition and results ==
=== Round 1 – first leg ===
Involved 8 matches (with no byes) and 16 clubs

All first round ties are played on a two-legged home and away basis

| Game No | Fixture date | Home team | Score | Away team | Venue | agg | Att | Rec | Notes | Ref |
|---|---|---|---|---|---|---|---|---|---|---|
| 1 | Sat 30 Aug 1952 | Huddersfield | 19–14 | Hunslet | Fartown | | 14,780 | | | |
| 2 | Sat 30 Aug 1952 | Halifax | 35–2 | Bramley | Thrum Hall | | | | | |
| 3 | Sat 30 Aug 1952 | Keighley | 16–7 | Castleford | Lawkholme Lane | | | | | |
| 4 | Sat 30 Aug 1952 | Wakefield Trinity | 15–22 | Hull Kingston Rovers | Belle Vue | | | | | |
| 5 | Sat 30 Aug 1952 | Featherstone Rovers | 25–6 | York | Post Office Road | | | | | |
| 6 | Sat 30 Aug 1952 | Batley | 12–10 | Dewsbury | Mount Pleasant | | | | | |
| 7 | Sat 30 Aug 1952 | Hull | 7–8 | Leeds | Boulevard | | | | | |
| 8 | Sat 30 Aug 1952 | Doncaster | 12–11 | Bradford Northern | York Road Greyhound Stadium | | | | | |

=== Round 1 – second leg ===
Involved 8 matches (with no byes) and 16 clubs

All first round ties are played on a two-legged home and away basis

| Game No | Fixture date | Home team | Score | Away team | Venue | agg | Att | Rec | Notes | Ref |
|---|---|---|---|---|---|---|---|---|---|---|
| 1 | Tue 2 Sep 1952 | Hunslet | 2–18 | Huddersfield | Parkside | 16–37 | 15,199 | | | |
| 2 | Wed 3 Sep 1952 | Bramley | 12–20 | Halifax | Barley Mow | 14–55 | | | | |
| 3 | Wed 3 Sep 1952 | Castleford | 8–6 | Keighley | Wheldon Road | 15–22 | | | | |
| 4 | Wed 3 Sep 1952 | Hull Kingston Rovers | 16–11 | Wakefield Trinity | Craven Park (1) | 38–26 | | | | |
| 5 | Wed 3 Sep 1952 | York | 16–8 | Featherstone Rovers | Clarence Street | 22–33 | | | | |
| 6 | Fri 5 Sep 1952 | Dewsbury | 4–16 | Batley | Crown Flatt | 14–28 | | | | |
| 7 | Fri 5 Sep 1952 | Leeds | 2–10 | Hull | Headingley | 10–17 | | | | |
| 8 | Mon 8 Sep 1952 | Bradford Northern | 9–11 | Doncaster | Odsal | 20–23 | | | | |

=== Round 2 - quarterfinals ===
Involved 4 matches and 8 clubs

All second round ties are played on a knock-out basis

| Game No | Fixture date | Home team | Score | Away team | Venue | agg | Att | Rec | Notes | Ref |
|---|---|---|---|---|---|---|---|---|---|---|
| 1 | Mon 22 Sep 1952 | Hull | 9–29 | Huddersfield | Boulevard | | 13,630 | | | |
| 2 | Tue 23 Sep 1952 | Batley | 20–11 | Keighley | Mount Pleasant | | | | | |
| 3 | Wed 24 Sep 1952 | Featherstone Rovers | 14–4 | Hull Kingston Rovers | Post Office Road | | | | | |
| 4 | Wed 24 Sep 1952 | Halifax | 4–3 | Doncaster | Thrum Hall | | | | | |

=== Round 3 – semifinals ===
Involved 2 matches and 4 clubs

Both semi-final ties are played on a knock-out basis

| Game No | Fixture date | Home team | Score | Away team | Venue | agg | Att | Rec | Notes | Ref |
|---|---|---|---|---|---|---|---|---|---|---|
| 1 | Wed 8 Oct 1952 | Featherstone Rovers | 4–8 | Batley | Post Office Road | | | | | |
| 2 | Mon 13 Oct 1952 | Huddersfield | 9–9 | Halifax | Fartown | | 8,998 | | | |

=== Round 3 – semifinals - Replay ===
Involved 2 matches and 4 clubs

Both semi-final ties are played on a knock-out basis

| Game No | Fixture date | Home team | Score | Away team | Venue | agg | Att | Rec | Notes | Ref |
|---|---|---|---|---|---|---|---|---|---|---|
| R | Thu 16 Oct 1952 | Halifax | 5–15 | Huddersfield | Thrum Hall | | 12,000 | | | |

=== Final ===
| Game No | Fixture date | Home team | Score | Away team | Venue | agg | Att | Rec | Notes | Ref |
|---|---|---|---|---|---|---|---|---|---|---|
| | Saturday 15 November 1952 | Huddersfield | 18–8 | Batley | Headingley | | 15,500 | £2,471 | (Note: The attendance is variably given as 15,500 by the official Huddersfield 1953 Yearbook, 15,000 by RUGBYLEAGUEproject but 14,705 by the Rothmans Rugby League Yearbook of 1991-92 and 1990-91) (Note: Headingley, Leeds, is the home ground of Leeds RLFC with a capacity of 21,000. The record attendance was 40,175 for a league match between Leeds and Bradford Northern on 21 May 1947.) | |

==== Teams and scorers ====
| Huddersfield | № | Batley |
|---|---|---|
| | teams | |
| Johnny Hunter | 1 | Phil Walshaw |
| Peter Henderson | 2 | Gordon Harrison |
| Peter Ramsden | 3 | George Kenny |
| Pat Devery | 4 | William "Bill" Riches |
| Lionel Cooper | 5 | John Etty |
| Russell Pepperell | 6 | William "Billy" Riley |
| Billy Banks | 7 | Raymond "Ray" Laycock (c) |
| Ted Slevin | 8 | Frank Wagstaff |
| George Curran | 9 | Harold McIntyre |
| William Griffin | 10 | Trevor Jones |
| John "Jack" Brown | 11 | George Palmer |
| John "Jack" Large | 12 | Clarrie Briggs |
| Dave Valentine (c) | 13 | John Westbury |
| William R. 'Bill' Smith | Coach | Alex Fiddes |
| 18 | score | 8 |
| 10 | HT | 3 |
| | Scorers | |
| | Tries | |
| Lionel Cooper (3) | T | John Etty (1) |
| Dave Valentine (1) | T | George Kenny (1) |
| | Goals | |
| Pat Devery (3) | G | Raymond "Ray" Laycock (1) |
| Referee | | C F (Charlie) Appleton (Warrington) |

Scoring - Try = three (3) points - Goal = two (2) points - Drop goal = two (2) points

=== The road to success ===
All the ties in the first round were played on a two leg (home and away) basis.

For the first round ties, the first club named in each of the ties played the first leg at home.

For the first round ties, the scores shown are the aggregate score over the two legs.

First round
Featherstone Rovers | 22
Bradford Northern | 30
Leeds | 43
Bramley | 17
Wakefield Trinity | 33
Hull | 23
Hull Kingston Rovers | 24
Huddersfield | 38
Castleford | 14
Keighley | 20
Dewsbury | 18
Halifax | 19
Doncaster | 6
Hunslet | 21
Batley | 28
York | 13

Second round
Bradford Northern | 13
Leeds | 14
Wakefield Trinity | 14
Huddersfield | 5
Keighley | 18
Halifax | 14
Hunslet | 27
Batley | 8

Semifinals
Leeds | 17
Wakefield Trinity | 18
Keighley | 15
Hunslet | 9

Final
Wakefield Trinity | 17
Keighley | 3

== See also ==
- 1952–53 Northern Rugby Football League season
- Rugby league county cups
