= Joe Jorgenson =

Australia international rugby league footballer

Personal information
- Full name: Cedric Kevin Jorgenson
- Born: 12 September 1921 Berry, New South Wales
- Died: 7 May 1993 (aged 71) West Ryde, New South Wales

Playing information
- Position: Centre
Club
Years	Team	Pld	T	G	FG	P
1939–42	Port Kembla
1943	Wollongong
1944–53	Balmain	98	22	334	0	734
1947	Junee
1954	Parramatta	5	0	11	0	22
	Total	103	22	345	0	756
Representative
Years	Team	Pld	T	G	FG	P
1941–46	New South Wales	11	3	31	0	74
1946	Australia	3	0	4	0	8
1945–46	NSW City	2	3	11	0	31
1941–43	NSW Country	3	1	5	0	13
- Source: As of 20 June 2019

Joe Jorgenson (12 September 1921 – 7 May 1993) was an Australian rugby league footballer of the 1940s and '50s. He was a three-quarter for the Australian national team who played in three Tests in 1946, two as captain. Jorgensen also represented New South Wales and played for Sydney's Balmain club, winning the 1944, 1946 and 1947 Premierships with them.

== Club career ==
Born in Berry, New South Wales on 21 September 1921 of Norwegian descent, Jorgenson started playing rugby league after he left school at 16. In 1939 he played with the Port Kembla club in the Wollongong competition. He missed the 1940 season through illness but returned in 1941 in which he year he debuted in Country NSW and New South Wales representative sides.

In 1944 he joined the Balmain club in Sydney and scored over 100 points, assisting the side to a premiership win. They were runners up to Easts in 1945 and triumphant again in 1946 with Jorgenson scoring two tries in the premiership decider against St George.

In 1947 after having played the regular season in the Maher Cup as captain coach of Junee, Jorgenson returned to Balmain lower grades for the finals and in the s Grand Final against Canterbury made his sole first grade appearance for the 1947 NSWRFL season. After the regular kicker Pat Devery missed three attempts, Jorgenson took over and scored all of the team's points in the 13–9 victory comeback after trailing 0–9. Victorious he was chaired from the field by his team-mates.

Jorgenson had a nine-year career with Balmain playing 98 games and scoring 734 points.

In 1953 Jorgenson transferred from Balmain and played as captain-coach of Canowindra Rugby League Club (now Canowindra Tigers).

Jorgenson finished his career with Parramatta in 1954 and made 5 appearances in his one season at the club in which they finished last on the table.

== Goal kicking pioneer ==
At the time goalkickers tended to stand the ball up in a divot in the ground made with the player's boot heel. Whilst some kickers experimented with laying the ball down, Jorgenson introduced the idea of laying the ball on a mound of dirt and kicking toe first with a straight follow through.

He had enormous success with this new method and some statistics include:

- 25 goals in the four NSW v Queensland interstate games of 1945–46
- 8 goals from 9 attempts in the muddy interstate game at the Sydney Cricket Ground May 1945.

== Representative career ==
In 1945 and 46 he was a regular in state representative sides and captained New South Wales in the fixtures of 1946 against Queensland and against the visiting British Lions.

Jorgenson was then selected for and made captain of the Australian Test side of 1946 for the first post-World War II Ashes series. He was captain for the 1st and 3rd tests of the series with Ron Bailey captain in the 2nd test. The selectors felt that the captaincy pressure affected Jorgenson's kicking style, a possibility supported by the fact that he landed only one goal in the first Test from six attempts. He is listed on the Australian Players Register as Kangaroo No. 225.

He did not represent at state or national level again. He died on 7 May 1993.

== Sources ==
- Whiticker, Alan (2004) Captaining the Kangaroos, New Holland, Sydney

Preceded by Wally Prigg	Australian national rugby league captain 1946	Succeeded by Ron Bailey
