= Billy Blan =

Great Britain and England international rugby league footballer (1922–2008)

Personal information
- Full name: William Blan
- Born: 2 May 1922 Wigan district, England
- Died: 13 April 2008 (aged 85) Wigan, England

Playing information
- Position: Second-row, Loose forward
Club
| Years | Team | Pld | T | G | FG | P |
|---|---|---|---|---|---|---|
| 1945–53 | Wigan | 255 | 77 | 4 | 0 | 239 |
| 1953–55 | Leeds | 45 |
| 1955 | St. Helens | 17 | 2 | 7 | 0 | 20 |
| 1955 | Leeds | 11 |
| 1955–56 | Rochdale Hornets | 10 |
| | Total | 338 | 79 | 11 | 0 | 259 |
Representative
| Years | Team | Pld | T | G | FG | P |
| 1950–53 | Lancashire | 6 |
| 1951–52 | England | 3 | 0 | 0 | 0 | 0 |
| 1951 | Great Britain | 3 | 1 | 0 | 0 | 3 |
- Relatives: Albert Blan (brother)

William Blan (2 May 1922 – 13 April 2008) was an English professional rugby league footballer who played in the 1940s and 1950s. He played at representative level for Great Britain, England and Lancashire, and at club level for Wigan, Leeds (two spells), St. Helens and Rochdale Hornets, as a second-row or loose forward.

== Background ==
Blan's birth was registered in Wigan district, Lancashire, England, he was the younger brother of the rugby league footballer Jack Blan, and the older brother of the rugby league footballer Albert Blan, he died aged 85–86 in Wigan, Greater Manchester, leaving behind his wife; Pat, and five children.

== Playing career ==
=== Challenge Cup Final appearances ===
Blan played at second-row in Wigan's 8–3 victory over Bradford Northern in the 1947–48 Challenge Cup Final during the 1947–48 season at Wembley Stadium, London on Saturday 1 May 1948, in front of a crowd of 91,465.

=== County Cup Final appearances ===
Blan played at second-row and scored a try in Wigan's the 9–3 victory over Belle Vue Rangers in the 1946–47 Lancashire Cup Final during the 1946–47 season at Station Road, Swinton on Saturday 26 October 1946, played at second-row in the 10–7 victory over Belle Vue Rangers in the 1947–48 Lancashire Cup Final during the 1947–48 season at Wilderspool Stadium, Warrington on Saturday 1 November 1947, played at second-row in the 14–8 victory over Warrington in the 1948–49 Lancashire Cup Final during the 1948–49 season at Station Road, Swinton on Saturday 13 November 1948, played loose forward and scored a try in the 20–7 victory over Leigh in the 1949–50 Lancashire Cup Final during the 1949–50 season at Wilderspool Stadium, Warrington on Saturday 29 October 1949, and played loose forward in the 28–5 victory over Warrington in the 1950–51 Lancashire Cup Final during the 1950–51 season at Station Road, Swinton on Saturday 4 November 1950.

=== Club career ===
Blan joined Wigan from the Royal Air Force straight after World War II, and won a Championship medal in his first season. In his Wigan career he won two Challenge Cup Winners medals, three Championship medals, and five Lancashire Cup winners medals. Billy Blan made his début for Leeds against Hunslet in the Lazenby Cup at Headingley on Monday 10 August 1953.

=== International honours ===
Blan won caps for England while at Wigan in 1951 against Wales, and France, in 1952 against Other Nationalities, and won caps for Great Britain while at Wigan in 1951 against New Zealand (3 matches).

== Honoured at Wigan ==
Billy Blan was a life member at Wigan.

== After playing ==
After Billy Blan finished his playing career, he worked as Wigan's Lottery Manager in Pools Office.

== Note ==
The Civil Registration index gives William Blan's district of birth as being Barnsley, whereas other sources state Wigan.
