= George Palmer (rugby league) =

England international rugby league footballer

Personal information
- Born: c. 1925
- Died: 24 January 2016 (aged 91)

Playing information
- Position: Second-row
Club
Years	Team	Pld	T	G	FG	P
1948–58	Batley	344	12	0	0	36
Representative
Years	Team	Pld	T	G	FG	P
1951	England	1	0	0	0	0

George Palmer (c. 1925 – 24 January 2016) was an English professional rugby league footballer who played in the 1950s. He played at representative level for England, and at club level for Batley, as a second-row.

== Early life ==
Palmer grew up in east Hull, working in a local sawmill before joining the Royal Navy as a submariner in 1942.

== Playing career ==
=== Club career ===
When the Second World War ended, Palmer had trials with rugby league club Hull before joining Batley, where he played between 1948 and 1958. He made over 300 appearances for the club.

He played at second-row in Batley's 8-18 defeat by Huddersfield in the 1952 Yorkshire Cup Final during the 1952–53 season at Headingley, Leeds on Saturday 15 November 1952.

=== International honours ===
George Palmer won a cap for England while at Batley playing second-row in the 10-35 defeat by the Other Nationalities at Central Park, Wigan, on Wednesday 11 April 1951, in front of a crowd of 16,860.

== Death ==
Palmer died in 2016, aged 91.
