= Cec Cooper =

Australian former rugby league footballer (1926–2010)

Personal information
- Full name: Cecil James Cooper
- Born: 21 February 1926 Rylstone, New South Wales, Australia
- Died: 14 June 2010 (aged 84)

Playing information
- Position: Centre
Club
Years	Team	Pld	T	G	FG	P
1949–56	Canterbury-Bankstown	79	29	0	0	87
Representative
Years	Team	Pld	T	G	FG	P
1955	Queensland	1	0	1	0	2

Coaching information
Club
Years	Team	Gms	W	D	L	W%
1958–59	Canterbury-Bankstown	36	9	2	25	25
- Relatives: Lionel Cooper (brother)

Cecil James Cooper (21 February 1926 – 14 June 2010) was an Australian professional rugby league footballer who played in the 1940s and 1950s, and coached in the 1950s.

A New South Wales representative centre, he captained and later coached the Canterbury-Bankstown club of the New South Wales Rugby Football League. He is the brother of Australian international Lionel Cooper and fellow Canterbury-Bankstown players Col Cooper and Reg Cooper. In 1953, when captain of his club, Cec Cooper suffered a fractured spine.

Cooper died on 14 June 2010, at the age of 84.
