= Trevor Eather =

Australia international rugby league player

Personal information
- Full name: Trevor Nelson Eather
- Born: 9 August 1920 Boggabri, NSW, Australia
- Died: 2 December 1980 (aged 60)

Playing information
- Position: Centre / Wing
Club
Years	Team	Pld	T	G	FG	P
1947	Western Suburbs	12	1	0	0	3
Representative
Years	Team	Pld	T	G	FG	P
1946	New South Wales	2	1	0	0	3
1946	Australia	1	0	0	0	0

Trevor Nelson Eather (9 August 1920 – 2 December 1980) was an Australian rugby league player.

A farmer from Boggabri, Eather played centre for Australia against Great Britain in 1946, replacing injured captain Ron Bailey in the 3rd Test at the Sydney Cricket Ground.

Eather joined Western Suburbs in the 1947 NSWRFL season, featuring equally as a centre and winger. He appeared in the play-off win over St. George, then missed the semi-final against Balmain with a leg muscle injury, having tripped over a spectator in the hours before the game.
