= Alan Hornery =

Australia international rugby league footballer (1926-2009)

Personal information
- Full name: Allan George Hornery
- Born: 31 May 1926
- Died: 31 December 2009 (aged 83)

Playing information
- Position: Hooker
Club
Years	Team	Pld	T	G	FG	P
1948–51	Western Suburbs	58	3	0	0	9
Representative
Years	Team	Pld	T	G	FG	P
1953–57	Queensland	15	0	0	0	0
- Source: As of 3 May 2019

Alan Hornery was an Australian rugby league footballer who played in the 1940s and 1950s. He played for Western Suburbs in the New South Wales Rugby League (NSWRL) competition and for Souths in the Brisbane competition.

== Playing career ==
Hornery made his first grade debut in 1948. Hornery did not play in the club's premiership victory over Balmain at season's end. In 1950, Wests reached the 1950 NSWRL grand final against South Sydney. Hornery played at hooker as Souths defeated Western Suburbs 21–15 at the Sydney Sports Ground. The following season, Wests finished fourth on the table and reached the finals again. Hornery's last game for the club was the 37–9 semi final defeat against Manly-Warringah. The former Wests hooker went on to have a long career in the Brisbane competition.

Hornery then departed Western Suburbs and signed with Brisbane side Souths. He made his Queensland State debut in 1953, and toured New Zealand with the Australian side, although he did not appear in a Test. He garnered another 14 appearances over the next four years, playing against Great Britain (1954) and French (1955) teams, which were both on tour. Hornery was part of the Souths team which won the 1953 premiership. In the same year, Hornery was selected to play for Queensland and played a total of 15 representative games between 1953 and 1957. Hornery was later voted in the Souths team of the century.

== Career statistics ==
Australia – By Team
Team	Years	App	T	G	FG	Pts	W	L	D	Win %
Queensland First	1953–1957	15	–	–	–	–	3	12	0	20.00
