= George Curran =

GB & England international rugby league footballer

Personal information
- Full name: George Curran
- Born: 12 February 1918 Wigan, England
- Died: 29 September 1998 (aged 80) Wigan, England

Playing information
- Position: Prop, Hooker, Second-row
Club
Years	Team	Pld	T	G	FG	P
1940–50	Salford	175	12	1		38
1940–45	→ Wigan (guest)	17	0	0		0
1941–43	→ St Helens (guest)	6	0	0		0
≤1944–≥44	→ Dewsbury (guest)	100	9	0		27
1950–51	Wigan	46	8	0		24
1951–54	Huddersfield	92	3	0		9
	Total	436	32	1	0	98
Representative
Years	Team	Pld	T	G	FG	P
1946–49	Lancashire	7	0	0	0	0
1946–49	England	12	0	0	0	0
1946–49	Great Britain	6	3	0	0	9

George Curran (12 February 1918 – 29 December 1998) was an English professional rugby league footballer who played in the 1940s and 1950s. He played at representative level for Great Britain and England, and at club level for Salford, Dewsbury (World War II guest), Wigan (two spells, including the first as a World War II guest), Huddersfield and Liverpool City, as a prop, hooker, or second-row.

== Playing career ==
=== International honours ===
George Curran won caps for England while at Salford in 1946 against Wales (2 matches), and France, in 1947 against Wales (2 matches), and France, in 1948 against France (2 matches), and Wales, in 1949 against Wales, and France (2 matches), and won caps for Great Britain while at Salford in 1946 against Australia, and New Zealand, in 1947 against New Zealand, and in 1948–49 against Australia (3 matches).

=== Championship final appearances ===
George Curran played hooker in Dewsbury's 14-25 aggregate defeat by Wigan in the Championship Final during the 1943–44 season; the 9-13 first-leg defeat at Central Park, Wigan on Saturday 13 May 1944, and the 5-12 second-leg defeat at Crown Flatt, Dewsbury on Saturday 20 May 1944.

=== Challenge Cup Final appearances ===
George Curran played hooker in Wigan's 10-0 victory over Barrow in the 1951 Challenge Cup Final during the 1950–51 season at Wembley Stadium, London on Saturday 5 May 1951, and played hooker in Huddersfield's 15-10 victory over St. Helens in the 1953 Challenge Cup Final during the 1952–53 season at Wembley Stadium, London on Saturday 25 April 1953, in front of a crowd of 89,588.

=== County League appearances ===
George Curran played in Wigan's victory in the Lancashire League during the 1951–52 season.

=== County Cup Final appearances ===
George Curran played hooker in Huddersfield's 18-8 victory over Batley in the 1952 Yorkshire Cup Final during the 1952–53 season at Headingley, Leeds on Saturday 15 November 1952.

== Contemporaneous Article Extract ==
"Toured Australia and New Zealand in 1946 as a Salford player, but returned to join Wigan. Went to Fartown in December, 1951, and has played a large part in the success of the pack."
