= Fred Hughes (rugby) =

GB & Wales international rugby league & union footballer

Personal information
- Full name: Frederick Hughes
- Born: 30 September 1912 Llanelli, Carmarthenshire, Wales
- Died: 19 January 1976 (aged 63)

Playing information

Rugby union
Club
Years	Team	Pld	T	G	FG	P
≤1945–≤45	Llanelli RFC
≤1945–≤45	Swansea RFC
≤1945–≤45	Cheltenham RFC
	Total	0	0	0	0	0

Rugby league
- Position: Prop
Club
Years	Team	Pld	T	G	FG	P
1936–46	Barrow
1946–50	Workington Town
1950–≥50	Liverpool Stanley
	Total	0	0	0	0	0
Representative
Years	Team	Pld	T	G	FG	P
1945–46	Wales	3
≤1946	Great Britain	0

Frederick Hughes (30 September 1912 – 19 January 1976) was a Welsh rugby union and professional rugby league footballer who played in the 1940s. He played club level rugby union for Llanelli RFC, Swansea RFC and Cheltenham RFC, and representative level rugby league for Wales, and Great Britain (non-Tests) and at club level for Barrow, Workington Town and Liverpool Stanley, as a prop.

== Background ==
Fred Hughes was born in Llanelli, Wales, and he was the father of the association footballer of the 1960s, 1970s and 1980s for England and Liverpool; Emlyn Hughes.

== Rugby league career ==
=== Club career ===
Hughes switched from rugby union to rugby league in 1936, joining Barrow. In January 1946, he was transferred to Workington Town. In 1950, he was signed by Liverpool Stanley.

=== International honours ===
Fred Hughes won three caps for Wales in 1945–1946 while at Barrow and Workington Town. He was also a part of the 1946 'Indomitables' tour, but did not win any caps for Great Britain.
