= William Griffin (rugby) =

Wales international rugby league & union footballer

Bill Griffin
Personal information
- Full name: William A. Griffin
- Born: unknown Wales

Playing information

Rugby union
Club
Years	Team	Pld	T	G	FG	P
≤1951–1951	Abertillery RFC

Rugby league
- Position: Loose forward
Club
Years	Team	Pld	T	G	FG	P
1951–57	Huddersfield
Representative
Years	Team	Pld	T	G	FG	P
1952	Wales	1	0	0	0	0

William "Bill" Griffin (birth year unknown) is a Welsh former rugby union, and professional rugby league footballer who played in the 1950s. He played club level rugby union (RU) for Abertillery RFC, and representative level rugby league (RL) for Wales, and at club level for Huddersfield, as a loose forward.

== Rugby union ==
Griffin started his career in rugby union, where he played for Abertillery. In his final season at the club, he was the club's leading goal- and try-scorer.

== Rugby league ==
In June 1951, Griffin switched to rugby league and joined Huddersfield. He made his début in August 1951 against Halifax. He spent his entire rugby league career with the club, announcing his retirement during the 1956–57 season.

=== International honours ===
In rugby league, Griffin won one cap for Wales while at Huddersfield in 1952 against France.

=== County Cup Final appearances ===
Bill Griffin played at prop in Huddersfield's 18–8 victory over Batley in the 1952 Yorkshire Cup Final during the 1952–53 season at Headingley, Leeds on Saturday 15 November 1952.
