= Jimmy Lewthwaite =

Great Britain and England international rugby league footballer

Personal information
- Full name: James Lewthwaite
- Born: 10 November 1920 Cleator Moor, England
- Died: 23 December 2006 (aged 86) Barrow-in-Furness, England

Playing information
- Position: Wing
Club
Years	Team	Pld	T	G	FG	P
1943–57	Barrow	500	351	20		1093
Representative
Years	Team	Pld	T	G	FG	P
1945–56	Cumberland	20	4	0	0	12
1952	England	1	1	0	0	3

Jimmy Lewthwaite (10 November 1920 – 23 December 2006), also known by the nickname of "Gentleman Jim", was a rugby league Wing for Great Britain, England, Cumberland and Barrow.

== Early life ==
Lewthwaite represented Cumberland at rugby union and association football as a schoolboy, as well as winning a medal in the All-England Schools Athletics competition at the age of 13. He moved to Woodley, near Reading, shortly before turning 15 to work at an aircraft factory but later relocated to Barrow to take up an apprenticeship at the town's shipyard. He continued as a footballer and had trials with Blackburn Rovers and Preston North End before switching to rugby league with Barrow in 1943, making his first-team début against St. Helens in April that year.

== Playing career ==
=== Barrow ===
With Barrow he scored a club record 351 tries and kicked 20 goals in exactly 500 appearances from 1943–57. He scored 50 tries in his last season, 1956–57, another club record. He retired after Barrow's Rugby League Challenge Cup Final defeat by Leeds in 1957, one of three Wembley appearances he made with the Cumbrian club during that decade.

Lewthwaite played on the wing in Barrow's 0-10 defeat by Wigan in the 1951 Challenge Cup Final during the 1950–51 season at Wembley Stadium, London on Saturday 5 May 1951, played on the wing in the 21-12 victory over Workington Town in the 1955 Challenge Cup Final during the 1954–55 season at Wembley Stadium, London on Saturday 30 April 1955, in front of a crowd of 66,513, and played on the wing in the 7-9 defeat by Leeds in the 1957 Challenge Cup Final during the 1956–57 season at Wembley Stadium, London on Saturday 11 May 1957, in front of a crowd of 76,318.

Lewthwaite's Testimonial match at Barrow took place in 1956.

He was inducted into the club's Hall of Fame when it was launched in 2001, alongside 1950s teammates Phil Jackson and Willie Horne.

Lewthwaite holds Barrow's "Most Career Appearances" record with 500 appearances, and is first in Barrow's all time try scorers list with 354-tries.

=== Representative honours ===
Jimmy Lewthwaite represented Cumberland. Jimmy Lewthwaite played on the wing in Cumberland's 5-4 victory over Australia in the 1948–49 Kangaroo tour of Great Britain and France match at the Recreation Ground, Whitehaven on Wednesday 13 October 1948, in front of a crowd of 8,818.

On the international front he travelled to Australasia with Great Britain in 1946 – the famous "Indomitables" tour, named after the vessel on which they sailed, HMS Indomitable. He top-scored with 25 tries on that tour despite not making the Test team. He also won one England cap in 1952.
