= Jack Hutchinson (rugby league) =

Australian rugby league player

Personal information
- Full name: Jack Burnley Hutchinson
- Born: 21 March 1923 Maryville, NSW, Australia
- Died: 31 August 2003 (aged 80)

Playing information
- Position: Lock
Club
Years	Team	Pld	T	G	FG	P
1943–45	South Sydney	18	4	0	0	12
Representative
Years	Team	Pld	T	G	FG	P
1946	New South Wales	2	2	0	0	6
1946	Australia	1	0	0	0	0

Jack Burnley Hutchinson (21 March 1923 – 31 August 2003) was an Australian rugby league player.

Born in the Newcastle suburb of Maryville, Hutchinson was a New South Wales Schoolboy representative and played his early first-grade with Northern Suburbs, debuting in 1942.

Hutchinson was based in Darwin during his war service and also made 18 first-grade appearances with South Sydney over this period, as a lock and occasional second-rower.

In 1946, Hutchinson earned state representative honours for the first time and played lock for Australia in the 2nd Test against Great Britain at the Brisbane Exhibition Ground, replacing an injured Noel Mulligan.

Hutchinson retired following Northern Suburbs' premiership win of 1951.
