= Frank Drake (rugby league) =

Australia international rugby league player

Personal information
- Born: 15 February 1939 (age 86); Balmain, NSW, Australia

Playing information
- Position: Fullback
Club
Years	Team	Pld	T	G	FG	P
1958	Balmain Tigers	12	5	0	0	15
1964–65	Eastern Suburbs	20	1	0	0	3
	Total	32	6	0	0	18
Representative
Years	Team	Pld	T	G	FG	P
1959–63	Queensland	21	5	0	0	15
1961–62	Australia	2	1	0	0	3

Frank Drake (born 15 February 1939) is an Australian former rugby league player.

Drake was born in Sydney and educated at Christian Brothers College in the suburb of Rozelle.

A fullback, Drake captained Balmain in the junior Presidents Cup competition and during the 1958 NSWRFL season competed for the Tigers in first-grade. He played fullback when Keith Barnes was unavailable and was used as a winger in the finals series, which ended with a preliminary final loss to St. George.

Drake played in Queensland from 1959 to 1963 with Brisbane Souths and Toowoomba All Whites. He featured as a fullback in two Test matches for Australia during this period, against New Zealand at Auckland's Carlaw Park in 1961, then Great Britain at the Sydney Cricket Ground the following year, scoring a try in the latter. His try was the first ever by a Kangaroos fullback against Great Britain.

In 1964 and 1965, Drake competed in first-grade for Eastern Suburbs.
