= Reg Kay =

Australian rugby league player

Personal information
- Full name: David Reginald Kay
- Born: 13 September 1918; Wondai, QLD, Australia
- Died: 2 September 1989 (aged 70)

Playing information
- Position: Second row
Representative
Years	Team	Pld	T	G	FG	P
1946	Queensland	4	2	0	0	6
1946	Australia	3	0	0	0	0

David Reginald Kay (13 September 1918 – 2 September 1989) was an Australian rugby league player.

A second-rower, Kay played for both Souths and Wests in Brisbane. He gained Australia representative honours in 1946 when he featured in all three home Tests against Great Britain, forming a partnership with Arthur Clues.

Kay spent the 1949 season as an Australian rules footballer, playing for Morningside in the QANFL.

After returning to rugby league in 1950, Kay had a brief stint as coach of Norths.
