= Arthur Bassett (rugby) =

GB & Wales international rugby league & union footballer

Personal information
- Full name: Arthur Callaghan Bassett
- Born: 28 June 1914 Kenfig Hill, Wales
- Died: 30 December 1999 (aged 85) Matlock, England

Playing information
- Weight: 13 st 7 lb (86 kg)

Rugby union
- Position: Wing
Club
Years	Team	Pld	T	G	FG	P
	Maesteg RFC
19??–33	Neath RFC
1933–34	Glamorgan Police RFC
1934–35	Aberavon RFC
1935–39	Cardiff RFC	101	99
	Total	101	99	0	0	0
Representative
Years	Team	Pld	T	G	FG	P
1934–38	Wales	6	0	0	0	0

Rugby league
- Position: Wing
Club
Years	Team	Pld	T	G	FG	P
1939–48	Halifax	110	66	1	0	200
1948–??	York
	Total	110	66	1	0	200
Representative
Years	Team	Pld	T	G	FG	P
1946	Great Britain	2	5	0	0	15
1939–46	Wales	3	0	0	0	0
- Relatives: Jack Bassett (brother)

Arthur Bassett (28 June 1914 – 30 December 1999) was a Welsh dual-code international rugby union, and professional rugby league footballer who played in the 1930s and 1940s. He played representative level rugby union (RU) for Wales, and at club level for Maesteg, Neath, Glamorgan Police RFC, Aberavon RFC, Cardiff, switching to professional rugby football in 1939. He played representative level rugby league (RL) for Great Britain and Wales, and at club level for Halifax and York, as a wing.

== Background ==
Arthur Bassett was born in Kenfig Hill, Wales, he was the younger brother of the international rugby union footballer; Jack Bassett, and he died aged 85 in Matlock, Derbyshire.

== Playing career ==
=== International honours ===
Arthur Bassett won caps for Wales (RU) in 1934 against England, in 1935 against England, Scotland, and Ireland, and in 1938 against England, and Scotland, won caps for Wales (RL) while at Halifax 1939...1946 3-caps, and won caps for Great Britain (RL) while at Halifax in 1946 against Australia (2 matches). He scored a hat-trick of tries in Great Britain's victory over Australia at Brisbane in 1946

=== Challenge Cup Final appearances ===
Arthur Bassett played fullback in Halifax's 2–9 defeat by Leeds in the 1940–41 Challenge Cup Final during the 1940–41 season at Odsal, Bradford, in front of a crowd of 28,500.

== Honoured at Halifax ==
Arthur Bassett is a Halifax Hall of Fame Inductee.
