= Lionel Cooper (rugby league) =

Australian rugby league footballer

Personal information
- Full name: Lionel William Cooper
- Born: 18 February 1922 West Wyalong, New South Wales
- Died: 16 May 1987 (aged 65) Cherrybrook, New South Wales

Playing information
- Position: Wing
Club
Years	Team	Pld	T	G	FG	P
1945–46	Eastern Suburbs	27	14	0	0	42
1947–55	Huddersfield	333	420	42	0	1344
	Total	360	434	42	0	1386
Representative
Years	Team	Pld	T	G	FG	P
1945–46	New South Wales	6	8	0	0	24
1946	Australia	3	2	0	0	6
1949–53	Other Nationalities	14	13	0	0	39
1954	Combined Nationalities	1	0	0	0	0
1952	British Empire XIII	3	2	0	0	6
- Relatives: Cec Cooper (brother)

Lionel William Cooper (18 February 1922 – 16 May 1987) was an Australian professional rugby league footballer who played in the 1940s and 1950s. A state and international representative winger, he played in Sydney for the Eastern Suburbs club and in England for Huddersfield.

== Australian career ==
After being spotted playing Australian rules football in a services team in Darwin by Ray Stehr in 1941, Cooper joined the Eastern Suburbs club. Stehr invited Cooper to trial with the Roosters following World War II.

A powerful wing, Cooper played in just 6 matches before gaining selection for New South Wales. Later that year Cooper was a member of Eastern Suburbs' 8th premiership-winning team. In 1946 Cooper represented Sydney, New South Wales and Australia; he played in all three tests against the Great Britain Lions that year at home. Cooper also took out the 'NSW Player of the Year Award' in 1946.

The Gregory's reference describes him as a bullocking, bruising winger who was a great finisher of back-line movements. His hard-running style incorporated a hip-bumping technique to brush off defenders.

== British career ==
In 1947 he joined English club Huddersfield, where he had 9 successful seasons – scoring 420 tries, including 71 in the 1951–52 season. In one match that year, against Keighley, he scored a record 10 tries. Also joining Cooper was his friend Johnny Hunter, a full-back, and a little later Pat Devery, an Australian test centre who formed a partnership with Cooper on the left.

Cooper continued to play test rugby league whilst at Huddersfield, playing for 14 matches for the Other Nationalities in the International Championship between 1949 and 1953. He also played for the British Empire XIII versus New Zealand on Wednesday 23 January 1952 at Stamford Bridge.

Cooper played left-wing in Huddersfield's 4–11 defeat by Bradford Northern in the 1949 Yorkshire Cup Final during the 1949–50 season at Headingley, Leeds on Saturday 29 October 1949. He also played left-wing in the 18–8 victory over Batley in the 1952 Yorkshire Cup Final at Headingley on Saturday 15 November 1952, scoring 3 tries.

He also played in Huddersfield's 2–20 defeat by Wigan in the 1949–50 Championship Final at Maine Road, Manchester on Saturday 13 May 1950.

Cooper played on the wing and scored two tries in Huddersfield's 15–10 victory over St. Helens in the 1953 Challenge Cup Final during the 1952–53 season at Wembley Stadium, London on Saturday 25 April 1953, in front of a crowd of 89,588. Following a leg injury to Pat Devery during the match, Cooper moved to centre and took over the kicking duties.

Cooper's Testimonial match at Huddersfield took place in 1955.

== Family ==
Three of his brothers, Col, Reg and Cec Cooper, played with the Canterbury Bankstown club in Sydney, and another, Noel, played for St George.
