= Willie Horne =

Former GB & England international rugby league footballer

Personal information
- Full name: William Horne
- Born: 23 January 1922 Barrow-in-Furness, England
- Died: 23 March 2001 (aged 79) Barrow-in-Furness, England

Playing information
- Position: Stand-off
Club
Years	Team	Pld	T	G	FG	P
1942–43	Oldham	2	0	1	0	2
1943–59	Barrow	461	112	741	0	1818
	Total	463	112	742	0	1820
Representative
Years	Team	Pld	T	G	FG	P
1945–53	England	14	3	13	0	35
1945–54	Lancashire	14	4	19	0	50
1946–52	Great Britain	8	2	7	0	20

Willie Horne (23 January 1922 – 23 March 2001) was an English rugby league footballer of the 1940s and '50s. He played for Great Britain, England, Lancashire and Barrow between 1943 and 1959 and captained all four sides as a round the corner style goal-kicking stand-off. He captained Great Britain in a test series against Australia (1952). In October 2014 he was inducted into the Rugby League Hall of Fame, and is therefore regarded as one of the best 23 players in the history of the British game.

== Early life ==
Willie Horne as born on 23 January 1922 in Barrow-in-Furness, Lancashire, England. He played rugby league football and appeared in two games on trial with Oldham R.L.F.C., but turned down the opportunity to join the club, signing for his home town side Barrow instead in 1943.

== Playing career ==
Whilst playing for Barrow Horne was selected to go on the 1946 Great Britain Lions tour.

Horne played stand-off in Barrow's 0–10 defeat by Wigan in the 1951 Challenge Cup Final during the 1950–51 season at Wembley Stadium, London on Saturday 5 May 1951, Horne was the 1951–52 Northern Rugby Football League season's top point scorer. Horne played stand-off. Horne was the 1951–52 Northern Rugby Football League season's top point scorer. Horne played stand-off, and was captain in Barrow's 12–2 victory over Oldham in the 1954 Lancashire Cup Final during the 1954–55 season at Station Road, Swinton on Saturday 23 October 1954. Horne also represented Great Britain while at Barrow between 1952 and 1956 against France (1 non-Test match). Horne's Testimonial match for Barrow took place in 1955. Horne played stand-off, and was captain in the 21–12 victory over Workington Town in the 1955 Challenge Cup Final during the 1954–55 season at Wembley Stadium, London on Saturday 30 April 1955, in front of a crowd of 66,513.

Horne played in Barrow's 7–9 defeat by Leeds in the 1957 Challenge Cup Final during the 1956–57 season at Wembley Stadium, London on Saturday 11 May 1957, in front of a crowd of 76,318. Horne set new records for Barrow's "Most Career Points" with 1,818, and is ninth in Barrow's all time try scorers list with 112-tries.

== Post-playing ==
Horne was inducted into the Barrow club's Hall of Fame when it was launched in 2001 alongside 1950s teammates Phil Jackson and Jimmy Lewthwaite. Horne died on 23 March 2001 aged 79 at his home in Barrow-in-Furness, Cumbria, England and a statue of him now stands opposite Craven Park, the home of Barrow. This statue in Memory of Willie is sited in 'gardens' between Duke Street and Howard Street, in front of College House, Barrow-in-Furness.

In 2014 Horne was inducted into the Rugby Football League Hall of Fame.
