= Roy Westaway =

Australian rugby league player

Personal information
- Full name: Roy Lionel Westaway
- Born: 8 December 1917; Warwick, QLD, Australia
- Died: 24 December 1975 (aged 58)

Playing information
- Position: Prop
Representative
Years	Team	Pld	T	G	FG	P
1941–46	Queensland	9	2	0	0	6
1946	Australia	2	0	0	0	0

Roy Lionel Westaway (8 December 1917 – 24 December 1975) was an Australian rugby league player.

Born in Warwick, Queensland, Westaway was a Valleys prop and made his Queensland representative debut in 1941, before enlisting in the AIF. He served in New Guinea with the 2/5th Commando Squadron.

Westaway resumed his representative career in 1945 and the following year was in the front-row for Australia in the first two Test matches of their home series against Great Britain.

In 1947, Westaway joined Barcaldine as a player-coach.
