= 1949–50 Northern Rugby Football League season =

1949–50 Rugby Football League season
- League: Northern Rugby Football League
- Champions: Wigan
- League Leaders: Wigan
- Top point-scorer(s): Harold Palin 290
- Top try-scorer(s): Brian Nordgren 57

The 1949–50 Rugby Football League season was the 55th season of rugby league football. First placed Wigan successfully defended a challenge from second placed Huddersfield in the play-off final to claim the Rugby Football League Championship. The Challenge Cup winners were Warrington who beat Widnes 19-0 in the final. Wigan won the Lancashire League, and Huddersfield won the Yorkshire League. Wigan beat Leigh 20–7 to win the Lancashire Cup, and Bradford beat Huddersfield 11–4 to win the Yorkshire Cup. Crowds peaked in 1949-50 with a record 69.8 million paying to watch rugby league matches.

== Championship ==
This season the Rugby Football League Championship was determined by a final.

	Team	Pld	W	D	L	Pts
1	Wigan	36	31	1	4	63
2	Huddersfield	36	28	1	7	57
3	Swinton	36	25	4	7	54
4	Halifax	36	25	0	11	50
5	Salford	36	24	2	10	50
6	Leigh	36	24	1	11	49
7	St. Helens	36	23	2	11	48
8	Leeds	36	24	0	12	48
9	Dewsbury	36	23	0	13	46
10	Workington Town	36	22	1	13	45
11	Warrington	36	22	0	14	44
12	Castleford	36	20	0	16	40
13	Keighley	36	20	0	16	40
14	Wakefield Trinity	36	19	0	17	38
15	Hunslet	36	18	1	17	37
16	Widnes	36	16	4	16	36
17	Belle Vue Rangers	36	16	2	18	34
18	Oldham	36	15	4	17	34
19	Hull	36	15	3	18	33
20	Barrow	36	14	1	21	29
21	Bradford	36	14	1	21	29
22	Hull Kingston Rovers	36	14	1	21	29
23	Whitehaven	36	11	4	21	26
24	Batley	36	10	0	26	20
25	Featherstone Rovers	36	9	2	25	20
26	Bramley	36	6	1	29	13
27	Rochdale Hornets	36	5	2	29	12
28	York	36	6	0	30	12
29	Liverpool Stanley	36	4	0	32	8

=== Play-offs ===
The top four finishing teams entered a play-off series which culminated in a final between Wigan and Huddersfield, but not before Wigan had to re-play and defeat Halifax, with whom they drew in their first play-off match.

Semi-final / Replay
1	Wigan	5	18
4	Halifax	5	2
2	Huddersfield	9
3	Swinton	0

Championship final
Wigan	20
Huddersfield	2

Wigan were without eight of their regular starters for the final, as the players had been selected for the 1950 Great Britain Lions tour, and had already departed for Australia. Despite a weakened team, Wigan were able to win, claiming their seventh Rugby Football League Championship.

13 May 1950

Wigan	20 – 2	Huddersfield
Tries: Silcock, Broome, Nordgren, Blan; Goals: Ward (4)		Goals: Bawden

Maine Road, Manchester
Attendance: 65,065
Referee: M. Coates (Pudsey)

Wigan	Number	Huddersfield
	Teams	
Ted Ward	1	Johnny Hunter
Nat Silcock Jr.	2	Dick Cracknell
Jack Broome	3	Jeff Bawden
George Roughley	4	Pat Devery
Brian Nordgren	5	Lionel Cooper
Cecil Mountford	6	Russ Pepperell
Johnny Alty	7	Billy Banks
Ted Slevin	8	John Daly
Harold McIntyre	9	James Mundy
Frank Barton	10	Arthur Wilmot
Bill Hudson	11	Ken Morrison
Jack Large	12	Bob Nicholson
Billy Blan	13	Ike Owens
Jim Sullivan	Coach	Alex Fiddes

== Challenge Cup ==
Warrington beat Widnes 19-0 in the final played at Wembley in front of a crowd of 94,249. This was Warrington’s third Cup final win in nine Final appearances. In the match Albert Naughton, at centre for Warrington opposed his older brother Johnny, who was in the Widnes second row. This was the second successive Final that the losing side had failed to score. The Warrington scrum-half Gerry Helme won the Lance Todd Trophy for man-of-the-match.

== County cups ==
First round
Hull Kingston Rovers	10
Bramley	16
Keighley	60
Yorkshire Amateurs	10
York	22
Bradford	53
Castleford	25
Hull	21
Hunslet	7
Dewsbury	29
Batley	17
Halifax	9
Huddersfield	29
Leeds	13
Wakefield Trinity	31
Featherstone Rovers	14

Second round
Bramley	5
Keighley	4
Bradford	13
Castleford	6
Dewsbury	12
Batley	5
Huddersfield	20
Wakefield Trinity	12

Semifinals
Bramley	6
Bradford	8
Dewsbury	2
Huddersfield	7

Final
Bradford	11
Huddersfield	4
