= Ted Ward =

Former GB & Wales international rugby league footballer

Personal information
- Full name: Edward H. Ward
- Born: c. 1916; Garnant, Carmarthenshire, Wales
- Died: 9 May 1988 (aged 72); Garnant, Carmarthenshire, S. Wales.

Playing information

Rugby union
Club
Years	Team	Pld	T	G	FG	P
	Llanelli RFC

Rugby league
- Position: Centre
Club
Years	Team	Pld	T	G	FG	P
1938–50	Wigan	204	55	459	0	1083
1950–51	Oldham	9	0	7	0	14
1951–52	Cardiff RLFC	20
1953	Wigan	9	2	21	0	48
	Total	242	57	487	0	1145
Representative
Years	Team	Pld	T	G	FG	P
1946–51	Wales	13	1	25	0	53
1946	Great Britain	3	1	2	0	7

Coaching information
Club
Years	Team	Gms	W	D	L	W%
1953–56	Wigan

Edward H. Ward (c. 1916 – May 1988) was a Welsh rugby union, and professional rugby league footballer who played in the 1930s, 1940s and 1950s, and coached rugby league in the 1950s. He played club level rugby union (RU) for Amman United RFC, Llanelli RFC, and representative level rugby league (RL) for Great Britain and Wales, and at club level for Wigan (two spells), Oldham and Cardiff RLFC, as a goal-kicking centre, and coached club level rugby league (RL) for Wigan.

== Playing career ==
=== International honours ===
Ted Ward won 13 caps for Wales (RL) in 1946–1951 while at Wigan and Cardiff, and won caps for Great Britain (RL) while at Wigan in 1946 against Australia (2 matches) and New Zealand.

=== Challenge Cup Final appearances ===
Ted Ward played right-centre and scored a goal in Wigan's 8–3 victory over Bradford Northern in the 1947–48 Challenge Cup Final during the 1947–48 season at Wembley Stadium, London on Saturday 1 May 1948, in front of a crowd of 91,465.

=== County Cup Final appearances ===
Ted Ward played right-centre in Wigan's 10–7 victory over Salford in the 1938–39 Lancashire Cup Final during the 1938–39 season at Station Road, Swinton on Saturday 22 October 1938, played left wing in the 3–7 defeat by Widnes in the 1945–46 Lancashire Cup Final during the 1945–46 season at Wilderspool Stadium, Warrington on Saturday 27 October 1945, played right-centre and scored 2-goals in the 10–7 victory over Belle Vue Rangers in the 1947–48 Lancashire Cup Final during the 1947–48 season at Wilderspool Stadium, Warrington on Saturday 1 November 1947, played right-centre and scored 1-try, and 4-goals in the 14–8 victory over Warrington in the 1948–49 Lancashire Cup Final during the 1948–49 season at Station Road, Swinton on Saturday 13 November 1948.

=== Career records ===
Ted Ward is one of less than twenty-five Welshmen to have scored more than 1000-points in their rugby league career.

== Note ==
In some references the Welsh international statistics of Ted Ward are misallocated to Ernest Ward.
