= Clem Kennedy =

Australian rugby league footballer

Personal information
- Full name: Clement Michael Kennedy
- Born: 25 November 1921 Redfern, New South Wales, Australia
- Died: 17 December 2010 (aged 89) Mascot, New South Wales, Australia

Playing information
- Weight: 52 kg (8 st 3 lb)
- Position: Halfback
Club
| Years | Team | Pld | T | G | FG | P |
|---|---|---|---|---|---|---|
| 1939–46 | South Sydney | 40 | 14 | 0 | 0 | 42 |
| 1948–49 | Newtown | 9 | 2 | 0 | 0 | 8 |
| | Total | 49 | 16 | 0 | 0 | 50 |
Representative
| Years | Team | Pld | T | G | FG | P |
| 1945–47 | New South Wales | 5 | 2 | 0 | 0 | 6 |
| 1946 | Australia | 1 | 1 | 0 | 0 | 3 |
| 1945–46 | NSW City | 2 | 1 | 0 | 0 | 3 |
| 1947 | NSW Country | 1 | 1 | 0 | 0 | 3 |
- Source: As of 20 June 2019

Clement Michael Kennedy (25 November 1921 – 17 December 2010) was an Australian rugby league footballer who played in the 1930s and 1940s.

He played first grade Australian club football for the South Sydney club along with a brief stint for Newtown. Kennedy also played for both the New South Wales and Australia representative sides and served Australia during the Second World War seeing action in the Kokoda Track campaign.

== Background ==
He was born in Sydney, New South Wales, Australia.

== Rugby league career ==
Kennedy signed for South Sydney for the start of the 1939 New South Wales Rugby League premiership where he quickly cemented his place in the sides starting thirteen and became known as 'The Mighty Atom' or 'The Little Bully' because of his small stature, rough play and ability.

He served during the Second World War from 1941 to 1944 before returning to the Rabbitohs where his performances earned him a call up to the New South Wales side in late 1945 and the following year earned his debut cap for the Australian side even though his club failed to earn a victory in the entire season; further international honors eluded him however due to a string of injuries.

Kennedy later moved to the country where he would go on to play for Cessnock where his performances would warrant him selection in the Country side in 1947. He would move back to Sydney and play a season for Newtown before again heading back to the country and finishing his career with Grenfell.

== Second World War ==
While playing rugby league for South Sydney Kennedy was called up for active duty in 1941 for the Second World War where he also served on the Kokoda Track campaign for several months. During his service on the Kokoda Track he contracted a bout of malaria and then later suffered several shoulder injuries that would hamper his return to rugby league at the conclusion of the war.
