= Pat Devery =

Australian RL coach and former Australia international rugby league footballer

Personal information
- Full name: Patrick Charles Devery
- Born: 9 August 1922 Tweed Heads, New South Wales, Australia
- Died: 17 December 2017 (aged 95) Portland, Oregon, United States

Playing information
- Position: Five-eighth, Centre
Club
Years	Team	Pld	T	G	FG	P
1945–1945	Fortitude Valley	3	5
1944–47	Balmain	38	25	59	0	193
1947–54	Huddersfield	223	98	401	0	1096
	Total	264	128	460	0	1289
Representative
Years	Team	Pld	T	G	FG	P
1946–47	City NSW	6	4	3	0	18
1946–47	New South Wales	2	4	1	0	14
1946	Australia	3	0	0	0	0
1949	British Empire	1	0	2	0	4
1949–53	Other Nationalities	11	5	16	0	47

Coaching information
Club
Years	Team	Gms	W	D	L	W%
1955–56	Manly-Warringah	38	18	4	16	47
Representative
Years	Team	Gms	W	D	L	W%
1956	Country NSW	1	0	0	1	0

Patrick Charles Devery (9 August 1922 – 17 December 2017) was an Australian professional rugby league footballer who played in the 1940s and 1950s, and coached in the 1950s. An Australian international representative half, he played in Australia for the Balmain club, winning the 1944, 1946 and 1947 grand finals with them. He was also the 1947 season's top point-scorer. Devery then had a successful career playing in England for the Huddersfield club before returning to Sydney where he coached the Manly-Warringah club.

== Background ==
Devery was born in Tweed Heads, New South Wales on 9 August 1922.

== Playing career ==
=== Australia ===
A Tumbulgum junior, he played football in the Brisbane Rugby League for Fortitude Valley. Devery was then discovered by coach of Sydney's Balmain club Latchem Robinson while playing football in The Domain, Sydney as a sailor in the Royal Australian Navy during the war. Devery played for Balmain at halfback in the 1944 NSWRFL season's premiership final, scoring a try in his side's victory over Newtown.

Devery also represented Sydney on 6 occasions, New South Wales on 2 occasions between 1946–1947. During the 1946 Great Britain Lions tour he was selected to play as the Australian national team's five-eighth in all three Ashes tests. He is listed on the Australian Players Register as Kangaroo No.222. Balmain reached the 1946 NSWRFL season's premiership final and Devery played at centre in their victory over St. George. He was the 1947 NSWRFL season's top points scorer.

=== England ===
At the end of the 1947 season a large number of Australians signed with English clubs, headed by Devery who signed with Huddersfield for a fee of £1,350 Devery scored a try and kicked two goals in Huddersfield's 13–12 win over Warrington in the 1948–49 Northern Rugby Football League season's Championship Final at Maine Road, Manchester on Saturday 14 May 1949. In the same season he played left-centre in Huddersfield's 4–11 defeat by Bradford Northern in the 1949 Yorkshire Cup Final at Headingley, Leeds on Saturday 29 October 1949. The following season he again played in the Championship Final of the 1949–50 season as Huddersfield lost 2–20 to Wigan at Maine Road.

In 1952 Devery was a member of the Huddersfield team and scored 3-goals in the 18–8 victory over Batley in the 1952 Yorkshire Cup at Headingley on Saturday 15 November 1952. He played left-centre and scored a goal in Huddersfield's 15–10 victory over St. Helens in the 1953 Challenge Cup Final at Wembley Stadium, London on Saturday 25 April 1953, in front of a crowd of 89,588. During the game Devery was injured and as no substitutes were allowed at this time Devery continued to play but he and left winger Lionel Cooper exchanged places and Cooper took over the kicking duties. Devery went on to break the Huddersfield club's record for most points in a season with 332, achieved during the 1952–53 season. He scored over 1,000 points during his English career between 1948–1954. He also made 11-appearances for the Other Nationalities, and one appearance for the British Empire.

He was also a teacher at Oakes Elementary school in Huddersfield in the late 1940s, and early 1950s at the same time as Bon Spence the former Huddersfield Town Full back.

== Coaching career ==
On his return to Sydney, he commenced coaching the Manly-Warringah club in 1955, taking them to a third-place regular season finish. The 1956 season finished with Manly in sixth place, just missing out on a spot in the finals. In 1957 Devery finished his coaching career at Lithgow.

== Later years ==
Devery moved to the USA where he worked as teacher in a school at an American naval base in Puerto Rico. In 2005 Devery was named as one of the inaugural inductees into the Balmain Tigers Hall of Fame, he was the last surviving member of Huddersfield's 1952–53 Challenge Cup Final winning team. Retiring to Portland, Oregon, he died there on 17 December 2017 at the age of 95.
