= Ron Bailey (rugby league) =

Australian RL coach and former Australia international rugby league footballer

Personal information
- Full name: Ronald Bailey
- Born: 3 April 1914 Mayfield, New South Wales, Australia
- Died: 21 June 1989 (aged 75) Newcastle, New South Wales, Australia

Playing information
- Position: Centre
Club
Years	Team	Pld	T	G	FG	P
1937	Newtown	8	3	0	0	9
1937–39	Huddersfield
1940–41	Waratah Mayfield
1941–46	Canterbury-Bankstown	81	30	0	0	90
	Total	89	33	0	0	99
Representative
Years	Team	Pld	T	G	FG	P
1936	Newcastle	3	2	0	0	6
1945–46	Country NSW	1	0	0	0	0
1945–46	New South Wales	5	2	0	0	6
1946	Australia	2	1	0	0	3

Coaching information
Club
Years	Team	Gms	W	D	L	W%
1941	Canterbury-Bankstown	14	9	0	5	64
1944	Canterbury-Bankstown	0	0	0	0
	Total	14	9	0	5	64

Ron Bailey (1914–1989) was an Australian rugby league footballer who played in the 1930s, and 1940s. He was a New South Wales Country, New South Wales and Australian representative whose club career was played with Waratah Mayfield, Newtown, Canterbury-Bankstown in Sydney and overseas with Huddersfield. He captained his country in one Test in 1946 and was the first Canterbury-Bankstown player to do so.

== Club career ==
Bailey was graded with the Waratah Mayfield club at age 18. After that, he went on to represent the Country New South Wales rugby league team in 1935–36. In 1936 he came to the attention of Sydney talent scouts when he represented for Newcastle against a touring English side, downing the visitors 21–6.

Bailey came to Sydney for Newtown in 1937 and playing at centre alongside Frank Hyde helped Newtown to win the City Cup that year.

He accepted an offer to join Huddersfield in England in 1937 and played two seasons there as a loose forward.

Bailey returned to Australia at the outbreak of World War II and after another season at Waratah Mayfield joined Canterbury-Bankstown as captain-coach in 1941 back as a centre. Canterbury won a premiership under Bailey in 1942 when they won the grand final, 11–9.

== Representative career ==
After the war Bailey made his state and national representative debuts. He played five games for New South Wales against Queensland, and visiting English sides. He played two games for Australia against Great Britain in 1946, the second of those as captain.

With no international fixtures scheduled in 1947 Bailey had played his last Test in 1946. He played out the 1947–48 seasons as captain-coach with West Maitland before his retirement.

== Sources ==
- Whiticker, Alan (2004) Captaining the Kangaroos, New Holland, Sydney

Sporting positions
Preceded by Joe Jorgenson	Captain Australia; 1946	Succeeded by Len Smith
