= Bob Nicholson (rugby league) =

GB & England international rugby league footballer

Personal information
- Full name: Robert S. Nicholson
- Born: c. 1921 Cumberland, England
- Died: 6 April 1977 (aged 56) Whitehaven, England

Playing information
- Position: Prop, Second-row
Club
Years	Team	Pld	T	G	FG	P
1939–51	Huddersfield
1942	→ Hull FC (guest)
	Total	0	0	0	0	0
Representative
Years	Team	Pld	T	G	FG	P
1945–51	Cumberland	11	2	1	0	8
1945–49	England	7	1	0	0	3
1946–48	Great Britain	3	0	0	0	0

Robert S. Nicholson (c. 1921 – 1977) was an English professional rugby league footballer who played in the 1930s, 1940s and 1950s. He played at representative level for Great Britain, England and Cumberland, and at club level for Huddersfield and wartime guest at Hull FC, as a prop or second-row.

== Playing career ==
=== Club career ===
Nicholson played junior rugby league for Hensingham before signing with Huddersfield in 1939, but due to the Second World War, he did not make his first team debut for the club until 1944.

Nicholson played at second-row in Huddersfield's 4–11 defeat by Bradford Northern in the 1949 Yorkshire Cup Final during the 1949–50 season at Headingley, Leeds on Saturday 29 October 1949. Nicholson played second-row in Huddersfield's 2–20 defeat by Wigan in the Championship Final during the 1949–50 season at Maine Road, Manchester on Saturday 13 May 1950. His Testimonial match at Huddersfield took place in 1950.

Nicholson retired from rugby league in 1951, returning to Whitehaven and becoming the licensee of the Shakespeare Hotel.

=== Representative honours ===
Nicholson won caps for England while at Huddersfield in 1945 against Wales, in 1946 against France, in 1947 against Wales, in 1948 against France, in 1949 against Wales, and France, and won caps for Great Britain while at Huddersfield in 1946 against New Zealand, and in 1948 against Australia (2 matches). He also represented Cumberland.

Nicholson played at second-row in Cumberland's 5-4 victory over Australia in the 1948–49 Kangaroo tour of Great Britain and France match at the Recreation Ground, Whitehaven on Wednesday 13 October 1948, in front of a crowd of 8,818.
