= 1952–53 Challenge Cup =

Rugby league competition

- Duration: 5 rounds
- Winners: Huddersfield
- Runners-up: St Helens
- Lance Todd Trophy: Peter Ramsden

The 1952–53 Challenge Cup was the 52nd staging of rugby league's oldest knockout competition, the Challenge Cup.

== First round ==
Date	Team one	Score one	Team two	Score two
07 Feb	Barrow	20	Featherstone Rovers	8
07 Feb	Batley	6	Bradford Northern	15
07 Feb	Belle Vue Rangers	10	Keighley	2
07 Feb	Halifax	14	Dewsbury	7
07 Feb	Huddersfield	36	Castleford	14
07 Feb	Hull Kingston Rovers	12	Doncaster	0
07 Feb	Hunslet	14	Workington Town	12
07 Feb	Leigh	34	Bramley	10
07 Feb	Liverpool	3	Swinton	26
07 Feb	Orford Tannery	2	Warrington	46
07 Feb	St Helens	20	Oldham	4
07 Feb	Salford	24	York	14
07 Feb	Wakefield Trinity	9	Leeds	33
07 Feb	Whitehaven	13	Hull FC	6
07 Feb	Widnes	28	NDLB	0
07 Feb	Wigan	27	Rochdale Hornets	7
14 Feb	Bramley	3	Leigh	11
14 Feb	Castleford	2	Huddersfield	6
14 Feb	Doncaster	5	Hull Kingston Rovers	5
14 Feb	Featherstone Rovers	5	Barrow	15
14 Feb	Hull FC	14	Whitehaven	5
14 Feb	Keighley	7	Belle Vue Rangers	0
14 Feb	NDLB	3	Widnes	22
14 Feb	Oldham	5	St Helens	5
14 Feb	Swinton	12	Liverpool	4
14 Feb	Warrington	46	Orford Tannery	8
14 Feb	Workington Town	12	Hunslet	8
17 Feb	Dewsbury	2	Halifax	16
18 Feb	Leeds	32	Wakefield Trinity	9
18 Feb	York	3	Salford	8
19 Feb	Rochdale Hornets	15	Wigan	24
23 Feb	Bradford Northern	17	Batley	3

== Second round ==
Date	Team one	Score one	Team two	Score two
28 Feb	Bradford Northern	18	Salford	4
28 Feb	Huddersfield	21	Barrow	7
28 Feb	Hull Kingston Rovers	14	Swinton	3
28 Feb	Leeds	26	Widnes	17
28 Feb	Leigh	7	Halifax	7
28 Feb	St Helens	28	Belle Vue Rangers	0
28 Feb	Warrington	10	Workington Town	2
28 Feb	Wigan	18	Hull FC	10
04 Mar	Halifax	4	Leigh	7

== Quarterfinals ==
A club record 69,429 people watch the Challenge Cup 3rd Round tie at Odsal between Bradford Northern and Huddersfield. Larger crowds had watched matches at Odsal, but this was the largest involving the home side.

Date	Team one	Score one	Team two	Score two
14 Mar	Bradford Northern	7	Huddersfield	17
14 Mar	Leigh	3	St Helens	12
14 Mar	Warrington	25	Leeds	8
14 Mar	Wigan	25	Hull Kingston Rovers	6

== Semifinals ==
Date	Team one	Score one	Team two	Score two
28 Mar	Huddersfield	7	Wigan	0
28 Mar	Warrington	3	St Helens	9

== Final ==
In the final, Huddersfield beat St. Helens 15–10 at Wembley in front of a crowd of 89,588. This produced a record gate taking for a Challenge Cup final of £31,000.

This was Huddersfield’s sixth Cup final win in seven Final appearances, including one win during the Second World War. coached by William R. 'Bill' Smith, their stand-off half, Peter Ramsden, became the youngest player to win the Lance Todd Trophy for man-of-the-match at 19. the Huddersfield team also featured Australian Pat Devery and New Zealand's Peter Henderson.

25 April 1953

Huddersfield	15 - 10	St Helens
Tries: Ramsden (2), Banks; Goals: Devery, Cooper (2)	Report	Tries: Llewellyn, Langfield; Goals Langfield; DG Langfield

Wembley, London
Attendance: 89,588

== Coverage ==
The draw for the first round of the cup was broadcast live on television, and was the first time a rugby league cup draw had been televised.

The final itself was untelevised, as the Rugby League Council refused permission to broadcast the match due to concerns that this would impact the attendance.
