= 1948–49 Northern Rugby Football League season =

1948–49 Rugby Football League season
- League: Northern Rugby Football League
- Champions: Huddersfield
- League Leaders: Warrington
- Top point-scorer: Ted Ward 312
- Top try-scorer: Lionel Cooper 60

The 1948–49 Rugby Football League season was the 54th season of rugby league football. This was Whitehaven's inaugural season in the League.

== Season summary ==
Warrington finished the regular season as the league leaders. However, Huddersfield won their sixth Championship when they beat Warrington 13–12 in the championship final. The game, played at Maine Road, Manchester, attracted a crowd of 75,194 and receipts of £11,073 setting new records for both attendances and receipts for a rugby league game played anywhere other than Wembley. Huddersfield's Australian fullback, Johnny Hunter scored 16 tries during the season, breaking the record for a fullback set by Jim Sullivan.

The Challenge Cup winners were Bradford who beat Halifax 12–0 in the final.

Warrington won the Lancashire League, and Huddersfield won the Yorkshire League. Wigan beat Warrington 14–8 to win the Lancashire Cup and Bradford Northern beat Castleford 18–9 to win the Yorkshire Cup.

== Championship ==
	Team	Pld	W	D	L	Pts
1	Warrington	36	31	0	5	62
2	Wigan	36	28	1	7	57
3	Huddersfield	36	27	0	9	54
4	Barrow	36	25	1	10	51
5	Widnes	36	24	2	10	50
6	Batley	36	23	0	13	46
7	Salford	36	20	5	11	45
8	Workington Town	36	22	1	13	45
9	Swinton	36	21	3	12	45
10	Bradford Northern	36	22	0	14	44
11	St. Helens	36	20	1	15	41
12	Wakefield Trinity	36	19	1	16	39
13	Hull	36	19	0	17	38
14	Leeds	36	18	1	17	37
15	Keighley	36	17	3	16	37
16	Hunslet	36	17	0	19	34
17	Hull Kingston Rovers	36	17	0	19	34
18	Leigh	36	14	5	17	33
19	Castleford	36	16	0	20	32
20	Dewsbury	36	15	1	20	31
21	Belle Vue Rangers	36	14	1	21	29
22	Rochdale Hornets	36	12	3	21	27
23	Oldham	36	12	3	21	27
24	Bramley	36	12	2	22	26
25	Halifax	36	11	3	22	25
26	Featherstone Rovers	36	9	3	24	21
27	Whitehaven	36	6	2	28	14
28	York	36	5	2	29	12
29	Liverpool Stanley	36	3	2	31	8

=== Play-offs ===
Semi-finals
1	Warrington	23
4	Barrow	8
2	Wigan	5
3	Huddersfield	14

Championship final
Warrington	12
Huddersfield	13

==== Final ====
14 May 1949

Huddersfield	13 – 12	Warrington
Tries: Devery, Cooper, Daly; Goals: Devery (2)		Tries: Jackson, Francis; Goals: Bath (2), Palin

Maine Road, Manchester
Attendance: 75,194
Referee: M. Coates (Pudsey)

Huddersfield	Number	Warrington
	Teams	
Johnny Hunter	1	Les Jones
John Anderson	2	Brian Bevan
Archie Ferguson	3	Albert Pimblett
Pat Devery	4	Bill Jackson
Lionel Cooper	5	Roy Francis
Russell Pepperell	6	Jack Fleming
Billy Banks	7	Gerry Helme
John Maiden	8	Bill Derbyshire
Mel Meek	9	Harold Fishwick
John Daly	10	Bill Riley
Ike Owens	11	Harry Bath
Bob Nicholson	12	Jim Featherstone
Dave Valentine	13	Harold Palin
	Coach	Chris Brockbank

== Challenge Cup ==
The Challenge Cup tournament's final was to be played by Bradford and Halifax at Wembley Stadium. It was the first time tickets to the Challenge Cup final were sold out. Bradford won the game 12–0 in the final played in front of a world record rugby league crowd of 95,050. Trevor Foster and Eric Batten scored the tries for Bradford and Ernest Ward kicked three goals as well as winning the Lance Todd Trophy for man-of-the-match.

This was Bradford's fourth Cup Final win in seven Final appearances including one win and one loss during World War II.

== Sources ==
- 1948-49 Rugby Football League season at wigan.rlfans.com
- "The Challenge Cup at The Rugby Football League website". The Rugby Football League. Archived from the original on 3 April 2009.
