= Ron Rylance =

England international rugby league footballer

Personal information
- Full name: Ronald Rylance
- Born: 11 March 1924 Wakefield, West Riding of Yorkshire, England
- Died: 11 January 1998 (aged 73) Wakefield, West Riding of Yorkshire, England

Playing information
- Height: 5 ft 10 in (1.78 m)
- Weight: 11 st 7 lb (73 kg)
- Position: Fullback, Wing, Centre, Stand-off
Club
Years	Team	Pld	T	G	FG	P
1941–50	Wakefield Trinity	218	87	204	0	669
194?–4?	→Castleford (guest)
1950–51	Dewsbury	53	14	94	0	230
1951–55	Huddersfield	97	27	91	0	263
	Total	368	128	389	0	1162
Representative
Years	Team	Pld	T	G	FG	P
1945–54	Yorkshire	6
1947	England	1	0	1	0	2

Ronald "Ron" Rylance (11 March 1924 – 11 January 1998) was an English World Cup winning professional rugby league footballer who played as a fullback, wing, centre and stand-off in the 1940s and 1950s. He played at representative level for England and Yorkshire, and at club level for Wakefield Trinity (captain), Castleford, Dewsbury and Huddersfield.

== Background ==
Rylance was born in Wakefield, West Riding of Yorkshire, England, and he died aged 73 in Wakefield, West Yorkshire, England, and he is buried Sugar Lane Cemetery, Wakefield, that is adjacent to Belle Vue stadium.

== Playing career ==
Rylance made his début for Wakefield Trinity in the 27–2 victory over Broughton Rangers at Belle Vue on Saturday 6 September 1941. In 1950, he was transferred from Wakefield Trinity to Dewsbury. In August 1951, he moved to Huddersfield. he appears to have scored no

=== Challenge Cup Final appearances ===
Rylance played on the wing in Wakefield Trinity's 13–12 victory over Wigan in the 1945–46 Challenge Cup Final during the 1945–46 season at Wembley Stadium, London on Saturday 4 May 1946, in front of a crowd of 54,730.

=== County Cup Final appearances ===
Rylance played stand-off in Wakefield Trinity's 2–5 defeat by Bradford Northern in the 1945–46 Yorkshire Cup Final during the 1945–46 season at Thrum Hall, Halifax on Saturday 3 November 1945, played at centre, and scored a try in the 10–0 victory over Hull F.C. in the 1946–47 Yorkshire Cup Final during the 1946–47 season at Headingley, Leeds on Saturday 31 November 1946, he did not play in the 7–7 draw with Leeds in the 1947–48 Yorkshire Cup Final during the 1947–48 season at Fartown Ground, Huddersfield on Saturday 1 November 1947, and played on the wing and was captain in the 8–7 victory over Leeds in the 1947–48 Yorkshire Cup Final replay during the 1947–48 season at Odsal Stadium, Bradford on Wednesday 5 November 1947.

=== Representative honours ===
Rylance won a cap for England while at Wakefield Trinity in 1947 against Wales.

He was in the Great Britain squad while at Huddersfield for the 1954 Rugby League World Cup in France, but did not participate in any of the four matches.

Rylance was selected for Yorkshire County XIII while at Wakefield Trinity during the 1945/46 and 1946/47 seasons.

== Contemporaneous Article Extract ==
"Played RU with Wakefield Q.E. Grammar School, but had experience of RL in workshop competitions before joining Wakefield Trinity in 1943. Primarily an off-half, he also occupied the centre, fullback, and wing berths with skill and credit to give valuable service to the Club. In '45/6 he scored 113 points in 11 weeks – a remarkable scoring run. Gained Yorkshire and England recognition. Dewsbury paid record fee for his transfer in 1950, after which he later joined Huddersfield before returning to Belle Vue as a committee member."

== Genealogical information ==
Ron Rylance's marriage to Betty (née Reyner) was registered during fourth ¼ 1948 in Wakefield district. They had 4 children; Ronald Mike Rylance born in Wakefield district), sports journalist and editor (Rugby Leaguer & League Express and Rugby League World), and author, Elizabeth in Dewsbury district), Fiona in Wakefield district), and Louise born in Northampton).
