= Harry Murphy =

GB & England international rugby league footballer

Personal information
- Full name: Harry Murphy
- Born: 26 August 1920; Wakefield, England
- Died: second ¼ 1981 (aged 60); Wakefield, England

Playing information
- Position: Second-row, Loose forward
Club
Years	Team	Pld	T	G	FG	P
1940–52	Wakefield Trinity	290	50	62	0	274
194?–4?	→Castleford (guest)
1953–≥53	Keighley
	Total	290	50	62	0	274
Representative
Years	Team	Pld	T	G	FG	P
1948–49	Yorkshire	3	0	0	0	0
1946–48	England	3	0	0	0	0
1950	Great Britain	1	0	0	0	0

Harry Murphy (26 August 1920 – second ¼ 1981) was an English professional rugby league footballer who played in the 1930s, 1940s and 1950s. He played at representative level for Great Britain, England and Yorkshire, and at club level for Wakefield Trinity, Castleford, and Keighley, as a second-row, or loose forward.

== Background ==
Harry Murphy's birth was registered in Wakefield, West Riding of Yorkshire, England, and he died aged 60 in Wakefield, West Yorkshire, England. The pub called "Harry's Bar" at 107B Westgate, Wakefield is named after Harry Murphy.

== Playing career ==
=== Club career ===
Murphy made his début for Wakefield Trinity during April 1940, and he played his last match for Wakefield Trinity during October 1952.

Murphy played at second-row in Wakefield Trinity’s 2-5 defeat by Bradford Northern in the 1945–46 Yorkshire Cup Final during the 1945–46 season at Thrum Hall, Halifax on Saturday 3 November 1945, played at second-row in the 10–0 victory over Hull F.C. in the 1946–47 Yorkshire Cup Final during the 1946–47 season at Headingley, Leeds on Saturday 31 November 1946, played at second-row in the 7–7 draw with Leeds in the 1947 Yorkshire Cup Final during the 1947–48 season at Fartown Ground, Huddersfield on Saturday 1 November 1947, and played at second-row in the 8–7 victory over Leeds in the 1947–48 Yorkshire Cup Final replay during the 1947–48 season at Odsal Stadium, Bradford on Wednesday 5 November 1947.

He was transferred to Keighley in January 1953 in exchange for Bob Kelly.

=== Representative honours ===
Murphy won caps for England while at Wakefield Trinity in 1946 against France, and Wales, and a cap for Great Britain while at Wakefield Trinity in 1950 against Australia.

Murphy was selected for Yorkshire County XIII while at Wakefield Trinity during the 1948/49 season.

== Contemporaneous Article Extract ==
One of the many “home-grown” players who have made the full journey from the City Schools R.L. to the international arena. Centre with St. Austin’s School, became a forward with Trinity's own junior side. Joined Trinity 1937. In post-war football he went on to play for England, Yorkshire and Great Britain, touring twice.
