= Herbert Goodfellow =

England international rugby league footballer

Personal information
- Full name: Herbert Goodfellow
- Born: 31 July 1916 Sharlston, England
- Died: December 1997 (aged 81) unknown

Playing information
- Height: 5 ft 7 in (1.70 m)
- Weight: 11 st 5 lb (72 kg)
- Position: Scrum-half
Club
Years	Team	Pld	T	G	FG	P
1933–51	Wakefield Trinity	434	114	12	0	366
1939	→ Batley (guest)	1	1	0	0	3
1941	→ Castleford (guest)	1	0	0	0	0
1951–52	Oldham	23	2	0	0	6
	Total	459	117	12	0	375
Representative
Years	Team	Pld	T	G	FG	P
1938–46	Yorkshire	5	0	0	0	0
1939	England	1	0	0	0	0

Herbert Goodfellow (31 July 1916 – December 1997), also known by the nickname of "Goody", was an English professional rugby league footballer who played in the 1930s, 1940s and 1950s. He played at representative level for England and Yorkshire, and at club level for Wakefield Trinity (captain), Batley (World War II guest), Castleford (World War II guest) and Oldham, as a scrum-half.

== Playing career ==
=== Trinity career ===
Herbert Goodfellow was born in Sharlston, West Riding of Yorkshire, after his junior days in Sharlston, Herbert signed for Trinity in 1932, as a 16-year-old after representing Yorkshire schoolboys in 1930. He started as a young 'skinny' winger in the A team before developing his scrum half skills and making his first team début on 3 March 1934 when Keighley visited Belle Vue. He stamped his authority on the game with two tries in a 17–0 win. In an added bonus, he outplayed the Keighley scrum half, Kiwi veteran Ted Spillane. At the time he was the fourth youngest player to play for Trinity (after Ernest Pollard, Harry Wilkinson and Mick Exley), but he is 19th in that list now.

He gradually developed into a strong scrum half with a powerful hand off, which assisted him in scoring over a hundred tries for the club. After breaking his leg in the first match of the season, he missed the entire 1935–36 season. Representative honours followed with appearances for Yorkshire, an RL XIII rep side and England in 1937 & 1939. He headed the club's try scoring charts in 1938–39 with 22, before the war affected his Trinity progress.

As a coal miner, he was able to continue playing for Trinity through the war years, and he also played one match as a World War II guest for Batley, scoring a try against Huddersfield on Saturday 25 November 1939, and he played one match as a World War II guest at stand-off for Castleford against Leeds at Wheldon Road, Castleford on Saturday 29 March 1941. By the war's end, Trinity had a skilful and powerful side which saw them reach the 1945 Yorkshire Cup Final, third place in the league (1945–46), a Championship semi-final but a tremendous RL Challenge Cup Final victory, 13–12 against Wigan with Herbert being the mainstay at scrum half. He also picked up his fourth and fifth Yorkshire appearances in the 1945–46 season. He continued to defy injuries and picked up a Yorkshire Cup winners medal in 1947 after Trinity defeated Leeds, 8–7, in a replay after a 7–7 draw. This was at the fourth attempt after defeats in 1936, 1940 and 1945

He was also club captain for three seasons between 1948 and 1951, but played his last game against Oldham in October 1950, before transferring to the Watersheddings, Oldham four months later. His total of 434 appearances sees him 7th on the all-time Trinity appearance list and his 114 tries see him 8th on the all-time club try scoring lists. In addition to his 1946 RL Challenge Cup winners medal and 1947 Yorkshire Cup winners medal, his third winners medal at Trinity was the 1945-46 Yorkshire League Championship

Whilst at Trinity he was "supreme around the base of the scrum, skilful in the art and craft of scrum half play. When he fed a scrum near the opponents' line the question was "never would we get the ball, but, is it going to be Goodfellow or Bratley who will score?" Quote from '100 Years of Rugby' by Lindley & Armitage.

Goodfellow appears to have scored no drop-goals (or field-goals as they are currently known in Australasia), but prior to the 1974–75 season all goals, whether; conversions, penalties, or drop-goals, scored 2-points, consequently prior to this date drop-goals were often not explicitly documented, therefore '0' drop-goals may indicate drop-goals not recorded, rather than no drop-goals scored. In addition, prior to the 1949–50 season, the archaic field-goal was also still a valid means of scoring points.

Trinity club honours:

RL Challenge Cup: Winners 1945–46

Yorkshire Cup: Winners 1947–48, Runners up 1936–37, 1939-40 & 1945–46

Yorkshire League Championship: Winners 1945–46

=== International honours ===
Herbert's first international honours came in 1937 when he was selected for an RL XIII representative side that played Wales at Newcastle United's St.James' Park. He scored a try in a 12–15 defeat. Two years later he was selected for another RL XIII rep side which visited France, scoring another try in a 25–13 victory in Pau. His one and only cap for England came in 1939 against Wales, playing scrum half in a 3–16 defeat at Odsal, Bradford.

=== County honours ===
Herbert was selected for Yorkshire County XIII on five occasions. His début came in February 1938 with a 9–10 defeat by Lancashire at Rochdale. He played in both county championship games of 1938–39 with defeat by Cumberland at Workington (10–16) and a 10–10 draw with Lancashire at Leeds. With the resumption of the county championship in 1945–46 season, Herbert was one of five Trinity players to play in both games. He played alongside Dennis Baddeley (winger), Ron Rylance (stand off), Harry Wilkinson (prop) and Len Bratley (loose forward) against Cumberland (45–3 win at Leeds) and Lancashire (16–17 loss at Swinton).

=== Challenge Cup Final appearances ===
Herbert Goodfellow played scrum-half in Wakefield Trinity's 13–12 victory over Wigan in the 1945–46 Challenge Cup Final during the 1945–46 season at Wembley Stadium, London on Saturday 4 May 1946, in front of a crowd of 54,730.

Herbert Goodfellow was paid £10 for his part in the 1946 Challenge Cup Final victory (based on increases in average earnings, this would be approximately £988.90 in 2016). Unfortunately, Herbert Goodfellow was fined £5 (based on increases in average earnings, this would be approximately £494.45 in 2016) for failing to attend his shift at his Coal Mine.

=== County Cup Final appearances ===
Herbert Goodfellow played scrum-half in Wakefield Trinity's 2–9 defeat by York in the 1936–37 Yorkshire Cup Final during the 1936–37 season at Headingley, Leeds on Saturday 17 October 1936, played scrum-half in the 9–12 defeat by Featherstone Rovers in the 1940–41 Yorkshire Cup Final during the 1939–40 season at Odsal Stadium, Bradford on Saturday 22 June 1940, played scrum-half in the 2–5 defeat by Bradford Northern in the 1945–46 Yorkshire Cup Final during the 1945–46 season at Thrum Hall, Halifax on Saturday 3 November 1945, played scrum-half, and scored a try in the 7–7 draw with Leeds in the 1947 Yorkshire Cup Final during the 1947–48 Northern season at Fartown Ground, Huddersfield on Saturday 1 November 1947, and played scrum-half in the 8–7 victory over Leeds in the 1947–48 Yorkshire Cup Final replay during the 1947–48 Northern season at Odsal Stadium, Bradford on Wednesday 5 November 1947.

=== Testimonial match ===
Herbert Goodfellow's benefit season/testimonial match at Wakefield Trinity took place against Hunslet F.C. on Saturday 27 April 1946.

=== Wakefield Trinity Hall of Fame ===
Herbert Goodfellow was the first inductee into the Wakefield Trinity 'Class of 2015' Hall of Fame, following on from the eight inductees from 2014, which included Ian Brooke, Mick Exley, Neil Fox, Jonathan Parkin, Harold Poynton, David Topliss, Derek Turner & Harry Wilkinson

== Rugby family ==
There was a family rugby legacy long before Herbert tied his boot laces in Sharlston. His father, Fred J. Goodfellow, was a Sharlston rugby hero in the 1890s, and early 1900s. He was selected for Yorkshire against Northumberland and Lancashire in 1897, at rugby union, followed by further caps a year later, before turning to rugby league and signing for Holbeck, and later Hull and Dewsbury, playing for Yorkshire at rugby league level. When his professional days were over he returned to Sharlston where he played until 1921, retiring through injury, aged 41. Fred died in 1925, six years before Herbert signed for Trinity.

Source: "Rugby League Back o' t' wall" History of Sharlston Rovers ARLFC by Graham Chalkley

== Outside of rugby league ==
Herbert Goodfellow was the landlord of the Jacob's Well Tavern public house in Wakefield during the 1950s.

== Note ==
Herbert Goodfellow is incorrectly named Harry Goodfellow on the Englandrl.co.uk website, but is correctly named Herbert Goodfellow on the rugbyleagueproject.org, freebmd.org.uk, and independent.co.uk websites. Harry Goodfellow was in fact Herbert Goodfellow's brother.
