= Len Marson =

England international rugby league footballer

Personal information
- Full name: Leonard Marson
- Born: 22 August 1918; Hemsworth district, England
- Died: December 1994 (aged 76)

Playing information
- Height: 5 ft 10 in (1.78 m)
- Weight: 12 st 6 lb (79 kg)
- Position: Hooker, Loose forward
Club
Years	Team	Pld	T	G	FG	P
1939–52	Wakefield Trinity	305	23	0	0	69
1942	→ Hull F.C. (guest)	1	0	0	0	0
1952–54	Hunslet	29	1	0	0	3
	Total	335	24	0	0	72
Representative
Years	Team	Pld	T	G	FG	P
1947–51	Yorkshire	6
1949	England	1	0	0	0	0

Leonard Marson (22 August 1918 – December 1994) was an English professional rugby league footballer who played in the 1930s, 1940s and 1950s. He played at representative level for England and Yorkshire, and at club level for Fitzwilliam Intermediates, Wakefield Trinity, Hunslet and wartime guest at Hull F.C., as a hooker or loose forward.

== Background ==
Len Marson's birth was registered in Hemsworth district, West Riding of Yorkshire, England, and he died aged 76.

== Playing career ==
=== Club career ===
Marson made his début for Wakefield Trinity on Sunday 5 November 1939.

Marson played hooker in Wakefield Trinity's 13-12 victory over Wigan in the 1946 Challenge Cup Final during the 1945–46 season at Wembley Stadium, London on Saturday 4 May 1946, in front of a crowd of 54,730.

Marson played loose forward in Wakefield Trinity's 9-12 defeat by Featherstone Rovers in the 1940 Yorkshire Cup Final during the 1939–40 season at Odsal Stadium, Bradford on Saturday 22 June 1940, played hooker in the 2-5 defeat by Bradford Northern in the 1945 Yorkshire Cup Final during the 1945–46 season at Thrum Hall, Halifax on Saturday 3 November 1945, played hooker in the 10-0 victory over Hull F.C. in the 1946 Yorkshire Cup Final during the 1946–47 season at Headingley, Leeds on Saturday 31 November 1946, played hooker in the 7-7 draw with Leeds in the 1947 Yorkshire Cup Final during the 1947–48 Northern season at Fartown Ground, Huddersfield on Saturday 1 November 1947, and played hooker, and scored a try in the 8-7 victory over Leeds in the 1947 Yorkshire Cup Final replay during the 1947–48 Northern season at Odsal Stadium, Bradford on Wednesday 5 November 1947.

Marson's Testimonial match at Wakefield Trinity took place in 1951.

=== Representative honours ===
Marson won a cap for England while at Wakefield Trinity in 1949 against France.

Marson was selected for Yorkshire County XIII whilst at Wakefield Trinity during the 1947/48, 1948/49, 1949/50 and 1950/51 seasons.

== Contemporaneous article extract ==
"Joined Wakefield Trinity 1939 from Fitzwilliam Intermediates and played in various pack positions before taking over the hooking berth from Victor "Vic" Darlison. Gained Yorkshire County honours and was considered by many to be most unfortunate in not making at least one tour to Australia".
