= Johnny Jones (rugby league) =

English rugby league footballer

Personal information
- Full name: Johnny Jones
- Born: c. 1919

Playing information
- Height: 5 ft 8 in (173 cm)
- Weight: 11 st 9 lb (74 kg)
- Position: Stand-off
Club
Years	Team	Pld	T	G	FG	P
1935–37	Leeds	23	10	3	0	36
1937–48	Wakefield Trinity	125	30	2	0	94
	Total	148	40	5	0	130
Representative
Years	Team	Pld	T	G	FG	P
1938–46	Yorkshire	2	0	0	0	0

Johnny Jones (born c. 1919) was a professional rugby league footballer who played in the 1930s and 1940s. He played at representative level for Yorkshire, and at club level for Leeds and Wakefield Trinity, as a stand-off.

== Playing career ==
Jones won cap(s) for Yorkshire while at Wakefield Trinity. Jones played stand-off in Wakefield Trinity's 13–12 victory over Wigan in the 1946 Challenge Cup Final 1945–46 season at Wembley Stadium, London on Saturday 4 May 1946, in front of a crowd of 54,730. Jones played at centre in Wakefield Trinity's 2–5 defeat by Bradford Northern in the 1945 Yorkshire Cup Final during the 1945–46 season at Thrum Hall, Halifax on Saturday 3 November 1945, and played stand-off in the 10–0 victory over Hull F.C. in the 1946 Yorkshire Cup Final during the 1946–47 season at Headingley, Leeds on Saturday 31 November 1946.

Jones made his debut for Wakefield Trinity during November 1937.
