= Dennis Baddeley =

English rugby league footballer

Personal information
- Full name: Dennis Baddeley
- Born: 1 May 1921 Castleford, England
- Died: May 2006 (aged 85)

Playing information
- Height: 5 ft 10 in (1.78 m)
- Weight: 11 st 7 lb (73 kg)
- Position: Wing
Club
Years	Team	Pld	T	G	FG	P
1940–42	Castleford	12	3	0	0	9
1942–52	Wakefield Trinity	194	64	1	0	194
1943(guest)	→ Featherstone Rovers	1	0	0	0	0
	Total	207	67	1	0	203
Representative
Years	Team	Pld	T	G	FG	P
1945	Yorkshire	2	2	0	0	6

Dennis Baddeley (1 May 1921 – May 2006) was an English professional rugby league footballer who played in the 1940s and 1950s. He played at representative level for Yorkshire, and at club level for Castleford, Wakefield Trinity and Featherstone Rovers (World War II guest), as a wing.

== Background ==
Dennis Baddeley was born in Castleford, West Riding of Yorkshire, his birth was registered in Pontefract district, and he died aged 85.

== Playing career ==
=== Club career ===
Baddeley made his début for Wakefield Trinity during September 1943, he made his début for Featherstone Rovers on Saturday 17 April 1943.

Baddeley played on the wing in Wakefield Trinity's 13–12 victory over Wigan in the 1946 Challenge Cup Final during the 1945–46 season at Wembley Stadium, London on Saturday 4 May 1946, in front of a crowd of 54,730.

Baddeley played on the wing in Wakefield Trinity's 2–5 defeat by Bradford Northern in the 1945 Yorkshire Cup Final during the 1945–46 season at Thrum Hall, Halifax on Saturday 3 November 1945, and played on the wing in the 10–0 victory over Hull F.C. in the 1946 Yorkshire Cup Final during the 1946–47 season at Headingley, Leeds on Saturday 31 November 1946.

=== County honours ===
Baddeley was selected for Yorkshire County XIII whilst at Wakefield Trinity during the 1945/46 season.

== Contemporaneous Article Extract ==
Born in Castleford, he signed for Wakefield Trinity in 1943 after some successful work with Glass Houghton Intermediates. He soon became a leading try-scorer in Trinity's immediate post-war side and gained Yorkshire County recognition.
