= Billy Teall =

English rugby league footballer

Personal information
- Full name: William Teall
- Born: c. 1912 Sculcoates, Hull, England
- Died: 2001 (aged 89)

Playing information
- Height: 5 ft 10 in (178 cm)
- Weight: 13 st 0 lb (83 kg)
- Position: Fullback
Club
Years	Team	Pld	T	G	FG	P
1931–34	Hull FC
1934–36	Broughton Rangers
1936–48	Wakefield Trinity	325	7	115	0	251
	Total	325	7	115	0	251
Representative
Years	Team	Pld	T	G	FG	P
1937	Yorkshire	1	0	2	0	4

William Teall (c. 1912 – 2001) was an English professional rugby league footballer who played in the 1930s and 1940s. He played at representative level for Yorkshire, and at club level for Hull FC, Broughton Rangers and Wakefield Trinity as a fullback.

== Background ==
Billy Teall's birth was registered in Sculcoates, Hull, East Riding of Yorkshire, England.

== Playing career ==
=== County honours ===
Teall played for Yorkshire in 1937.

=== Challenge Cup Final appearances ===
Teall played fullback in Wakefield Trinity's 13-12 victory over Wigan in the 1945–46 Challenge Cup Final during the 1945–46 season at Wembley Stadium, London on Saturday 4 May 1946, in front of a crowd of 54,730.

=== County Cup Final appearances ===
Teall played fullback, and scored three goals in Wakefield Trinity's 9-12 defeat by Featherstone Rovers in the 1939–40 Yorkshire Cup Final during the 1939–40 season at Odsal Stadium, Bradford on Saturday 22 June 1940, played fullback in the 2-5 defeat by Bradford Northern in the 1945–46 Yorkshire Cup Final during the 1945–46 season at Thrum Hall, Halifax on Saturday 3 November 1945, played fullback in the 10-0 victory over Hull F.C. in the 1946–47 Yorkshire Cup Final during the 1946–47 season at Headingley, Leeds on Saturday 31 November 1946, played fullback in the 7-7 draw with Leeds in the 1947–48 Yorkshire Cup Final during the 1947–48 Northern season at Fartown Ground, Huddersfield on Saturday 1 November 1947, and played fullback, and scored a try in the 8-7 victory over Leeds in the 1947–48 Yorkshire Cup Final replay during the 1947–48 Northern season at Odsal Stadium, Bradford on Wednesday 5 November 1947.

=== Testimonial match ===
A benefit season/testimonial match for Len Bratley and Billy Teall took place at Wakefield Trinity including the 29–0 victory over Hull F.C. at Belle Vue, Wakefield on Saturday 3 April 1948 during the 1947–48 season.

=== Club career ===
Teall made his début for Wakefield Trinity in the 14-9 victory over York at Belle Vue, Wakefield on 3 October 1936, with 115 conversions he is 24th on Wakefield Trinity's all-time conversions list.
