= Jim Croston =

English rugby league coach (1911–1992)

Personal information
- Full name: Alfred James Croston
- Born: 3 April 1911 Wigan, England
- Died: August 1992 (aged 81) Pontefract, West Yorkshire, England

Playing information
- Height: 5 ft 11 in (1.80 m)
- Weight: 13 st 9 lb (87 kg)

Rugby union
Club
Years	Team	Pld	T	G	FG	P
	United Services Portsmouth RFC
Representative
Years	Team	Pld	T	G	FG	P
≤1933–≤33	Hampshire

Rugby league
- Position: Centre
Club
Years	Team	Pld	T	G	FG	P
1933–45	Castleford	283	150	52	0	554
1945–46	Wakefield Trinity	15	4	0	0	12
	Total	298	154	52	0	566
Representative
Years	Team	Pld	T	G	FG	P
1935–38	Lancashire	8	4	0	0	12
1936–39	England	6	0	0	0	0
1937	Great Britain	1	0	0	0	0

Coaching information
Club
Years	Team	Gms	W	D	L	W%
1945–47	Wakefield Trinity
1951–53	Wakefield Trinity
	Total	0	0	0	0

Alfred James Croston (3 April 1911 – August 1992) was an English rugby union, and professional rugby league footballer who played in the 1930s and 1940s, and coached rugby league in the 1940s and 1950s. He played representative level rugby union (RU) for Hampshire, at military level for Army Rugby Union (with Frank Whitcombe), and the 38th Field Company Royal Engineers, and at club level for United Services Portsmouth, and representative level rugby league (RL) for Great Britain, England and Lancashire, and at club level for Castleford and Wakefield Trinity (captain), as a centre, and coached at club level for Wakefield Trinity.

== Playing career ==
=== Castleford ===
Croston came from Wigan and had begun playing rugby at Castleford around 1932 after leaving the army, where he had played for United Services and won a cap for Hampshire.

Croston played at centre in Castleford's 11–8 victory over Huddersfield in the 1935 Challenge Cup Final during the 1934–35 season at Wembley Stadium, London on Saturday 4 May 1935, in front of a crowd of 39,000.

In November 1938, he put in a transfer request to the Castleford board and, although selected, did not turn up for the club's match with Hull. He was not named for the team that played Barrow on 26 November and said that he would retire from the sport unless his request was granted. Despite this, he was available to play for the club at the start of the 1938–39 season.

Croston played in Castleford's victory in the Yorkshire League during the 1938–39 season.

=== Wakefield Trinity ===
Croston made his début for Wakefield Trinity during September 1943, and he played his last match for Wakefield Trinity during the 1946–47 season.

He was captain in Wakefield Trinity's 13–12 victory over Wigan in the 1946 Challenge Cup Final during the 1945–46 season at Wembley Stadium, London on Saturday 4 May 1946, in front of a crowd of 54,730.

Croston was the coach in Wakefield Trinity's 2–5 defeat by Bradford Northern in the 1945 Yorkshire Cup Final during the 1945–46 season at Thrum Hall, Halifax on Saturday 3 November 1945, played at centre, and was the coach in the 10–0 victory over Hull F.C. in the 1946 Yorkshire Cup Final during the 1946–47 season at Headingley, Leeds on Saturday 31 November 1946, and was the coach (standing in for Harry Beverley) in the 17–3 victory over Keighley in the 1951 Yorkshire Cup Final during the 1951–52 Northern season at Fartown Ground, Huddersfield on Saturday 27 October 1951.

=== Representative honours ===
Jim Croston won caps for England while at Castleford in 1936 against Wales, in 1938 against Wales (2 matches), and France, in 1939 against France, and Wales, and won a cap for Great Britain while at Castleford in 1937 against Australia.

Jim Croston won caps for Lancashire while at Castleford; he played at centre in Lancashire's 5–5 draw with Yorkshire at Leeds' stadium on 9 January 1935, played in the 7–4 victory over Cumberland at Whitehaven's stadium on 21 September 1935, scored a try in the 28–6 victory over Yorkshire at Castleford's stadium on 21 October 1936, scored two tries in the 18–10 victory over Cumberland at St. Helens' stadium on 31 October 1936, played in the 23–17 victory over Cumberland at Workington Town's stadium on 18 September 1937, played at centre and scored a try in the 7–5 victory over Australia in the 1937–38 Kangaroo tour match at Wilderspool Stadium, Warrington on Wednesday 29 September 1937, in front of a crowd of 16,250. played in the 8–7 victory over Cumberland at Wigan's stadium on 14 September 38, and played in the 10–10 draw with Yorkshire at Leeds' stadium on 26 October 1938.
