= Harry Wilkinson (rugby league) =

England international rugby league footballer

Personal information
- Full name: Harold Wilkinson
- Born: 21 October 1909; Sharlston, Wakefield, England
- Died: 30 May 1971 (aged 61); Wakefield, England

Playing information
- Height: 5 ft 8.5 in (1.740 m)
- Weight: 14 st 12 lb (94 kg)
- Position: Prop, Loose forward
Club
Years	Team	Pld	T	G	FG	P
1930–49	Wakefield Trinity	618 (605?)	57	0	0	171
Representative
Years	Team	Pld	T	G	FG	P
1945–47	Yorkshire	≥2
1943–46	England	4	0	0	0	0

Harry Wilkinson (21 October 1909 – 30 May 1971) was an English professional rugby league footballer who played in the 1930s and 1940s. He played at representative level for England and Yorkshire, and at club level for Wakefield Trinity (captain), as a prop, or loose forward.

== Playing career ==
Wilkinson was born in Sharlston, Wakefield, West Riding of Yorkshire, England, following his retirement from playing rugby league he became the bagman at Wakefield Trinity c. 1950s, and he died aged 61 in Wakefield, West Riding of Yorkshire, England.

=== Challenge Cup Final appearances ===
Wilkinson played at prop in Wakefield Trinity's 13-12 victory over Wigan in the 1946 Challenge Cup Final during the 1945–46 season at Wembley Stadium, London on Saturday 4 May 1946, in front of a crowd of 54,730.

=== County Cup Final appearances ===
Wilkinson played loose forward in Wakefield Trinity's 0-8 defeat by Leeds in the 1932 Yorkshire Cup Final during the 1932–33 season at Fartown Ground, Huddersfield on Saturday 19 November 1932, played loose forward in the 5-5 draw with Leeds in the 1934 Yorkshire Cup Final during the 1934–35 season at Crown Flatt, Dewsbury on Saturday 27 October 1934, played loose forward in the 2-2 draw with Leeds in the 1934 Yorkshire Cup Final replay during the 1934–35 season at Fartown Ground, Huddersfield on Wednesday 31 October 1934, played loose forward in the 0-13 defeat by Leeds in the 1934 Yorkshire Cup Final second replay during the 1934–35 season at Parkside, Hunslet on Wednesday 7 November 1934, played at prop in the 2-9 defeat by York in the 1936 Yorkshire Cup Final during the 1936–37 season at Headingley, Leeds on Saturday 17 October 1936, played at prop in the 9-12 defeat by Featherstone Rovers in the 1940 Yorkshire Cup Final during the 1939–40 season at Odsal Stadium, Bradford on Saturday 22 June 1940, played at prop in the 2-5 defeat by Bradford Northern in the 1945 Yorkshire Cup Final during the 1945–46 season at Thrum Hall, Halifax on Saturday 3 November 1945, played at prop in the 10-0 victory over Hull F.C. in the 1946 Yorkshire Cup Final during the 1946–47 season at Headingley, Leeds on Saturday 31 November 1946, played at prop in the 7-7 draw with Leeds in the 1947 Yorkshire Cup Final during the 1947–48 Northern season at Fartown Ground, Huddersfield on Saturday 1 November 1947, and played at prop, and scored a try in the 8-7 victory over Leeds in the 1947 Yorkshire Cup Final replay during the 1947–48 Northern season at Odsal Stadium, Bradford on Wednesday 5 November 1947.

=== Notable tour matches ===
Wilkinson played loose forward in Wakefield Trinity's 6-17 defeat by Australia in the 1933–34 Kangaroo tour of Great Britain match during the 1933–34 season at Belle Vue, Wakefield on Saturday 28 October 1933.

=== Career records ===
Wilkinson holds Wakefield Trinity's "Most Career Appearances" record with 605 appearances, and Wakefield Trinity's "Most Consecutive Appearances" record with 96 appearances between 1939 and 1942.

=== Representative honours ===
Wilkinson, won caps for England while at Wakefield Trinity in 1943 against Wales, in 1944 against Wales, in 1945 against Wales, and in 1946 against France.

Wilkinson was selected for Yorkshire County XIII while at Wakefield Trinity during the 1945/46 and 1946/47 seasons.
