= Arthur Fletcher (rugby league) =

English rugby league footballer

Personal information
- Full name: Arthur Fletcher
- Born: unknown

Playing information
- Position: Stand-off, Scrum-half
Club
Years	Team	Pld	T	G	FG	P
19??–??	Hunslet RLFC
1945(guest)	→ Featherstone Rovers	1	0	0	0	0
1946–57	Wakefield Trinity	290	107	4	0	329
	Total	291	107	4	0	329
Representative
Years	Team	Pld	T	G	FG	P
1947/48–54/55	Yorkshire	≥4

Arthur Fletcher (birth unknown) is an English former professional rugby league footballer who played in the 1940s and 1950s. He played at representative level for Yorkshire, and at club level for Fryston Colliery ARLFC (Under-21s) (in Fryston, Wakefield), Wheldale Colliery ARLFC, Wakefield Trinity (captain), as a stand-off or scrum-half.

== Playing career ==
=== County Honours ===
Arthur Fletcher was selected for Yorkshire County XIII whilst at Wakefield Trinity during the 1947/48, 1948/49, 1953/54 and 1954/55 seasons.

=== County Cup Final appearances ===
Arthur Fletcher played scrum-half in Wakefield Trinity’s 10–0 victory over Hull F.C. in the 1946–47 Yorkshire Cup during the 1946–47 season at Headingley, Leeds on Saturday 31 November 1946, played stand-off in the 7–7 draw with Leeds in the 1947–48 Yorkshire Cup Final during the 1947–48 season at Fartown Ground, Huddersfield on Saturday 1 November 1947, played stand-off in the 8–7 victory over Leeds in the 1947–48 Yorkshire Cup Final replay during the 1947–48 season at Odsal Stadium, Bradford on Wednesday 5 November 1947, and played scrum-half in the 17–3 victory over Keighley in the 1951–52 Yorkshire Cup Final during the 1951–52 season at Fartown Ground, Huddersfield on Saturday 27 October 1951.

=== Club career ===
Arthur Fletcher made his début for Wakefield Trinity during April 1946.
