= James Higgins =

James Higgins may refer to:

- James Higgins (Australian cricketer) (1874–1957), Australian cricketer
- James Higgins (English cricketer) (1877–1954), English cricketer
- James Higgins (footballer) (1874–?), English footballer
- James Higgins (racing driver) (born 2005), British racing driver
- James Higgins (rugby league) (born c.1922), rugby league footballer of the 1940s for Wakefield Trinity
- James Higgins (Wisconsin politician) (1824–1910), member of the Wisconsin legislature
- James A. Higgins (1889–1962), New York state senator
- James B. Higgins (1920–1991), American football player and coach, college athletics administrator
- James D. Higgins (1913–1974), politician and judge in Newfoundland, Canada
- James H. Higgins (1876–1927), Rhode Island politician
- James W. Higgins (1896–1945), member of the Wisconsin legislature

== See also ==
- Jim Higgins (disambiguation)
