= Len Bratley =

England international rugby league footballer

Personal information
- Full name: Leonard Bratley
- Born: 24 September 1914 Newton Hill, Wakefield, England
- Died: July 1974 (aged 59)

Playing information
- Height: 6 ft 0 in (183 cm)
- Weight: 13 st 8 lb (86 kg)
- Position: Prop, Loose forward
Club
Years	Team	Pld	T	G	FG	P
1934–37	York
1937–49	Wakefield Trinity	236	94	3	0	288
1942–44	→Hull FC (guest)
	Total	236	94	3	0	288
Representative
Years	Team	Pld	T	G	FG	P
1945–46	Yorkshire	≥1
1945	England	1	0	0	0	0

Leonard Bratley (24 September 1914 – July 1974), was an English professional rugby league footballer who played in the 1930s and 1940s. He played at representative level for England and Yorkshire, and at club level for York and Wakefield Trinity, and as a wartime guest at Hull FC, as a prop or loose forward.

== Background ==
Len Bratley was born in Newton Hill, Wakefield, West Riding of Yorkshire, England, he was the landlord of the Admiral Duncan public house, 100 Thornes Lane, Wakefield, he also worked at Lofthouse Colliery, and he died aged 59. His older brother Arthur played Second-row for Featherstone Rovers 1936-37.

== Playing career ==
=== County League appearances ===
Bratley played in Wakefield Trinity's victory in the Yorkshire county league during the 1945–46 season.

=== Challenge Cup Final appearances ===
Bratley played loose forward in Wakefield Trinity's 13–12 victory over Wigan in the 1946 Challenge Cup Final during the 1945–46 season at Wembley Stadium, London on Saturday 4 May 1946.

=== County Cup Final appearances ===
Bratley played loose forward in Wakefield Trinity's 2–5 defeat by Bradford Northern in the 1945 Yorkshire Cup Final during the 1945–46 season at Thrum Hall, Halifax on Saturday 3 November 1945, played loose forward in the 10–0 victory over Hull F.C. in the 1946 Yorkshire Cup Final during the 1946–47 season at Headingley, Leeds on Saturday 2 November 1946, played loose forward in the 7–7 draw with Leeds in the 1947 Yorkshire Cup Final during the 1947–48 season at Fartown Ground, Huddersfield on Saturday 1 November 1947, and played loose forward, and scored a try in the 8–7 victory over Leeds in the 1947 Yorkshire Cup Final replay during the 1947–48 season at Odsal Stadium, Bradford on Wednesday 5 November 1947.

=== Club career ===
Bratley was transferred from York to Wakefield Trinity during November 1937, he made his début for Wakefield Trinity in the 12-5 victory over Salford at Belle Vue, Wakefield on Saturday 13 November 1937.

=== Testimonial match ===
A benefit season/testimonial match for Len Bratley and Billy Teall took place at Wakefield Trinity including the 29–0 victory over Hull F.C. at Belle Vue, Wakefield on Saturday 3 April 1948 during the 1947–48 season.

=== Career records ===
Len Bratley set two records for Wakefield Trinity for a forward by scoring 15-tries in a season, including a record 5-tries in the 34–12 victory over Huddersfield.

=== Representative honours ===
Bratley won a cap for England while at Wakefield Trinity in 1945 against Wales.

Bratley was selected for Yorkshire County XIII while at Wakefield Trinity during the 1945–46 season.
