= Jackie Perry =

English rugby league footballer (1924–2018)

Personal information
- Full name: John Perry
- Born: 27 May 1924 Altofts, Wakefield, England
- Died: 8 January 2018 (aged 93) North Wales

Playing information
- Position: Wing, Scrum-half
Club
Years	Team	Pld	T	G	FG	P
1943–48	Wakefield Trinity	134	85	112		479
1948–55	Batley	163	67	366		933
1955–56	Doncaster	10	4	30		72
	Total	307	156	508	0	1484
Representative
Years	Team	Pld	T	G	FG	P
1947	Yorkshire	2	2	0	0	6

John "Jackie" Perry (27 May 1924 – 8 January 2018) was an English professional rugby league footballer who played in the 1940s and 1950s. He played at representative level for Yorkshire, and at club level for Wheldale Colliery ARLFC, Wakefield Trinity, Batley and Doncaster, as a wing, or scrum-half.

== Background ==
Jackie Perry's birth was registered in Wakefield, West Riding of Yorkshire, England, he was a Bevin Boy after retiring from rugby Perry continued to work as he had throughout his playing career, as a miner, he eventually he left mining and became a shopkeeper and publican in Dewsbury before moving to Blackpool where he and his wife ran a boarding house. He retired to North Wales in 2012, and he died aged 93.

== Playing career ==
=== Wakefield Trinity ===
Perry signed for Wakefield Trinity in 1943 and made his debut against Leeds. Playing in 11 games he scored 7 tries and kicked 11 goals as Wakefield topped the league although they lost to Dewsbury in the play-off semi-final.

The following season Perry was Wakefield's top try scorer with 23 as Yorkshire finished third in the league. Wakefield reached three successive Yorkshire Cup Finals in 1945, 1946 and 1947. Perry did not play in the first but he played in the 10–0 victory over Hull F.C. in the 1946–47 Yorkshire Cup Final Headingley, Leeds on Saturday 31 November 1946 and both the drawn match and replay that formed the 1947 final against Leeds; a 7–7 draw at Fartown, Huddersfield on Saturday 1 November 1947 and an 8–7 victory in the replay at Odsal Stadium, Bradford on Wednesday 5 November 1947. During the replay he kicked the winning conversion as well as making a try-saving tackle on Leeds stand-off Dickie Williams.

=== Batley ===
Perry signed for Batley in December 1948 for a transfer fee of £1,000 and played for the club until 1955 during which he became one of the club's all-time top 20 try scorers.

=== Doncaster ===
At the end of the 1954–55 season Perry left Batley and joined Doncaster for the following season before retiring in 1956.

=== Representative honours ===
Perry played two games for Yorkshire during the 1947–48 season. Yorkshire lost both, 22–10 against Lancashire and 15–7 to Cumberland although Perry did score a try against Cumberland.
