= Billy Stott =

England international rugby league footballer

Personal information
- Full name: William Isaac C. Stott
- Born: 16 April 1913 Pontefract, England
- Died: third ¼ 1972 (aged 59) Pontefract district, England

Playing information
- Height: 5 ft 7.5 in (1.715 m)
- Weight: 13 st 0 lb (83 kg)
- Position: Centre, Stand-off
Club
Years	Team	Pld	T	G	FG	P
1930–33	Featherstone Rovers	108	29	65	0	217
1933–38	Broughton Rangers
1938–44	Oldham	81	22	144	0	354
1939/40	→ Featherstone Rovers (guest)	3
1943/44	→ Featherstone Rovers (guest)	2
1944–47	Wakefield Trinity	81	25	152	0	379
1947–??	Belle Vue Rangers
	Total	275	76	361	0	950
Representative
Years	Team	Pld	T	G	FG	P
1933–39	Yorkshire	7
1936	England	1	0	0	0	0

Coaching information
Club
Years	Team	Gms	W	D	L	W%
1948–49	Wakefield Trinity

William Isaac C. Stott (16 April 1913 – third ¼ 1972) was an English professional rugby league footballer who played in the 1930s and 1940s. He played at representative level for England and Yorkshire, and at club level for Featherstone Rovers (three spells, including the last two as a World War II guest), Broughton Rangers, Oldham, Wakefield Trinity (captain) and Belle Vue Rangers, as a goal-kicking centre or stand-off.

== Background ==
Billy Stott was born in Pontefract, West Riding of Yorkshire, England, he lived on a National Coal Board (NCB) housing estate at the top of Scotch Hill, off Girnhill Lane, Featherstone (now a Strata Homes development), and his death aged 59 was registered in Pontefract district, West Riding of Yorkshire, England.

== Playing career ==
=== Club career ===
Stott made his début for Featherstone Rovers on Saturday 29 March 1930, in 1933 he was transferred from Featherstone Rovers to Broughton Rangers for £750 (based on increases in average earnings, this would be approximately £137,700 in 2016).

Stott played at centre was captain, scored two tries, a goal, and the winning penalty late in the match, and was named man of the match, winning the inaugural Lance Todd Trophy in Wakefield Trinity's 13-12 victory over Wigan in the 1946 Challenge Cup Final during the 1945–46 season at Wembley Stadium, London on Saturday 4 May 1946, in front of a crowd of 54,730.

Stott played at centre and scored a goal in Wakefield Trinity's 2-5 defeat by Bradford Northern in the 1945 Yorkshire Cup Final during the 1945–46 season at Thrum Hall, Halifax on Saturday 3 November 1945, and played at centre and scored a two goals in the 7–7 draw with Leeds in the 1947 Yorkshire Cup Final during the 1947–48 season at Fartown Ground, Huddersfield on Saturday 1 November 1947, but did not play in the 8–7 victory over Leeds in the 1947 Yorkshire Cup Final replay during the 1947–48 season at Odsal Stadium, Bradford on Wednesday 5 November 1947.

=== Representative honours ===
Stott won a cap for England while at Broughton Rangers in the 2-3 defeat by Wales at Taff Vale Park, Pontypridd on Saturday 7 November 1936.

Stott won a cap for Yorkshire while at Featherstone Rovers; during the 1933–34 season against Australia, and won a cap(s) for Yorkshire while at Broughton Rangers.

== Personal life ==
Billy Stott was the brother of the rugby league footballer who played in the 1920s for Featherstone Rovers; Fred Stott.
