= 1947–48 Yorkshire Cup =

- Structure: Regional knockout championship
- Teams: 16
- Winners: Wakefield Trinity
- Runners-up: Leeds

The 1947–48 Yorkshire Cup was the fortieth occasion on which the Yorkshire Cup competition had been held.

Wakefield Trinity won the trophy by beating Leeds by the score of 8–7 in a replay, the first match having ended in a 7–7 draw.

The final was played at Fartown, Huddersfield, now in West Yorkshire. The attendance was 24,334 and receipts were £3,463.

The replay took place in mid-week, four days later at Odsal in the City of Bradford, now in West Yorkshire. The attendance was a marvellous 32,000 and receipts were £3,255.

This was Wakefield Trinity's second Yorkshire cup final triumph in successive years, and their third final appearance in three years.

== Background ==
This season, junior/amateur clubs Yorkshire Amateurs were again invited to take part and the number of clubs who entered remained at the same as last season's total number of sixteen.

This in turn resulted in no byes in the first round.

The competition again followed the original formula of a knock-out tournament, with the exception of the first round which was still played on a two-legged home and away basis.

== Competition and results ==
=== Round 1 – first leg ===
Involved 8 matches (with no byes) and 16 clubs

All first round ties are played on a two-legged home and away basis

Game No	Fixture date	Home team	Score	Away team	Venue	agg	Att	Rec	Notes	Ref
1	Thu 11 Sep 1947	Yorkshire Amateurs	0–41	Dewsbury	Thrum Hall				(Note: Yorkshire Amateurs were a team from Yorkshire which appeared to have players selected from many both professional and amateur clubs Yorkshire Amateurs played on many grounds, this match was played at Thrum Hall, the ground of Halifax)	
2	Sat 13 Sep 1947	Featherstone Rovers	5–9	Castleford	Post Office Road					
3	Sat 13 Sep 1947	Huddersfield	43–3	Bramley	Fartown					
4	Sat 13 Sep 1947	Hull	20–6	Batley	Boulevard					
5	Sat 13 Sep 1947	Hull Kingston Rovers	11–18	Wakefield Trinity	Craven Park (1)					
6	Sat 13 Sep 1947	Hunslet	8–14	Keighley	Parkside					
7	Sat 13 Sep 1947	Leeds	11–5	Bradford Northern	Headingley					
8	Sat 13 Sep 1947	York	7–16	Halifax	Clarence Street					

=== Round 1 – second leg ===
Involved 8 matches (with no byes) and 16 clubs

All first round ties are played on a two-legged home and away basis

Game No	Fixture date	Home team	Score	Away team	Venue	agg	Att	Rec	Notes	Ref
1	Sat 13 Sep 1947	Dewsbury	53–2	Yorkshire Amateurs	Crown Flatt	94–2				
2	Tue 16 Sep 1947	Castleford	6–3	Featherstone Rovers	Wheldon Road	15–8				
3	Wed 17 Sep 1947	Bramley	12–26	Huddersfield	Barley Mow	15–69				
4	Thu 16 Sep 1947	Batley	3–6	Hull	Mount Pleasant	9–26				
5	Wed 17 Sep 1947	Wakefield Trinity	12–3	Hull Kingston Rovers	Belle Vue	30–14				
6	Thu 16 Sep 1947	Keighley	8–13	Hunslet	Lawkholme Lane	22–21				
7	Wed 24 Sep 1947	Bradford Northern	11–9	Leeds	Odsal	16–20				
8	Mon 15 Sep 1947	Halifax	15–10	York	Thrum Hall	31–17				

=== Round 2 – quarterfinals ===
Involved 4 matches and 8 clubs

All second round ties are played on a knock-out basis

Game No	Fixture date	Home team	Score	Away team	Venue	agg	Att	Rec	Notes	Ref
1	Tue 23 Sep 1947	Halifax	7–18	Huddersfield	Thrum Hall					
2	Wed 24 Sep 1947	Keighley	2–9	Castleford	Lawkholme Lane					
3	Wed 1 Oct 1947	Leeds	15–7	Dewsbury	Headingley					
4	Wed 1 Oct 1947	Wakefield Trinity	23–14	Hull	Belle Vue					

=== Round 3 – semifinals ===
Involved 2 matches and 4 clubs

Both semi-final ties are played on a knock-out basis

Game No	Fixture date	Home team	Score	Away team	Venue	agg	Att	Rec	Notes	Ref
1	Wed 15 Oct 1947	Leeds	19–4	Castleford	Headingley					
2	Wed 15 Oct 1947	Wakefield Trinity	18–15	Huddersfield	Belle Vue		20000			

=== Final ===
Game No	Fixture date	Home team	Score	Away team	Venue	agg	Att	Rec	Notes	Ref
	Saturday 1 November 1947	Wakefield Trinity	7–7	Leeds	Fartown		24,334	£3,463	(Note: The attendance is given as 24,344 by the Rothmans Rugby League Yearbook of 1991–92 and 1990–91 but 24,334 by RUGBYLEAGUEproject and also by "100 Years of Rugby. The History of Wakefield Trinity 1873–1973") (Note: The receipts were stated as £3,461 in the Rothmans Rugby League Yearbook of 1991–92 and 1990–91 but £2 more in "100 Years of Rugby. The History of Wakefield Trinity 1873–1973") (Note: Fartown was the home ground of Huddersfield from 1878 to the end of the 1991–92 season to Huddersfield Town FC's Leeds Road stadium, and then to the McAlpine Stadium in 1994. Fartown remained as a sports/Rugby League ground but is now rather dilapidated, and is only used for staging amateur rugby league games. Due to lack of maintenance, terrace closures and finally major storm damage closing one of the stands in 1986, the final ground capacity had been reduced to just a few thousands although the record attendance was set in a Challenge cup semi-final on 19 April 1947 when a crowd of 35,136 saw Leeds beat Wakefield Trinity 21–0)	

=== Final - Replay ===
Game No	Fixture date	Home team	Score	Away team	Venue	agg	Att	Rec	Notes	Ref
	Wednesday 5 November 1947	Wakefield Trinity	8–7	Leeds	Odsal		32,000	£3,255	(Note: The receipts were stated as £3,251 in the Rothmans Rugby League Yearbook of 1991–92 and 1990–91 but £4 more in "100 Years of Rugby. The History of Wakefield Trinity 1873–1973".) (Note: Odsal is the home ground of Bradford Northern from 1890 to 2010 and the current capacity is in the region of 26,000, The ground is famous for hosting the largest attendance at an English sports ground when 102,569 (it was reported that over 120,000 actually attended as several areas of boundary fencing collapse under the sheer weight of numbers) attended the replay of the Challenge Cup final on 5 May 1954 to see Halifax v Warrington)	

==== Teams and scorers ====
Wakefield Trinity	№	Leeds
	teams	
William "Billy" Teall	1	
Jackie Perry	2	
William "Billy" Stott	3	
Denis "Dinny" Boocker	4	
Reginald Jenkinson	5	
Arthur Fletcher	6	
Herbert "Harry" Goodfellow	7	
Harry Wilkinson (c)	8	
Leonard "Len" Marson	9	
James "Jim" Higgins	10	
Harry Murphy	11	
John "Jack" Booth	12	
Leonard "Len" Bratley	13	
??	Coach	Dai Prosser
7	score	7
2	HT	0
	Scorers	
	Tries	
Herbert "Harry" Goodfellow (1)	T	1
	Goals	
William "Billy" Stott (2)	G	2
Referee		unknown
Second Leg
Wakefield Trinity	teams	Leeds
William "Billy" Teall	1	
Jackie Perry	2	
Reginald Jenkinson	3	
Denis "Dinny" Boocker	4	
Ronald "Ron" Rylance	5	
Arthur Fletcher	6	
Herbert "Harry" Goodfellow	7	
Harry Wilkinson	8	
Leonard "Len" Marson	9	
James "Jim" Higgins	10	
Harry Murphy	11	
John "Jack" Booth	12	
Leonard "Len" Bratley	13	
??	Coach	??
8	score	7
2	HT	0
	Scorers	
	Tries	
Harry Wilkinson (1)	T	1
Leonard "Len" Bratley (1)	T	
	Goals	
Jackie Perry (1)	G	2
	G	
Referee	Referee	unknown

Scoring – Try = three (3) points – Goal = two (2) points – Drop goal = two (2) points

=== The road to success ===
All the ties in the first round were played on a two leg (home and away) basis.

For the first round ties, the first club named in each of the ties played the first leg at home.

For the first round ties, the scores shown are the aggregate score over the two legs.

First round
Hull Kingston Rovers	14
Wakefield Trinity	30
Hull	26
Batley	9
York	17
Halifax	30
Huddersfield	69
Bramley	15
Leeds	20
Bradford Northern	16
Yorkshire Amateurs	2
Dewsbury	94
Hunslet	21
Keighley	22
Featherstone Rovers	8
Castleford	15

Second round
Wakefield Trinity	23
Hull	14
Halifax	7
Huddersfield	18
Leeds	15
Dewsbury	7
Keighley	2
Castleford	9

Semifinals
Wakefield Trinity	18
Huddersfield	15
Leeds	19
Castleford	4

Final
Wakefield Trinity	7 (8)
Leeds	7 (7)

== See also ==
- 1947–48 Northern Rugby Football League season
- Rugby league county cups
