= Jim Higgins (rugby league) =

English rugby league footballer

James Higgins
Personal information
- Full name: James Higgins
- Born: c. 1922

Playing information
- Height: 6 ft 1 in (185 cm)
- Weight: 14 st 8 lb (93 kg)
- Position: Prop, Hooker
Club
Years	Team	Pld	T	G	FG	P
1945–54	Wakefield Trinity	220	14	0	0	42

James Higgins (born c. 1922) is a former professional rugby league footballer who played in the 1940s and 1950s. He played at club level for Wakefield Trinity, as a prop or hooker.

== Playing career ==
=== Challenge Cup Final appearances ===
Jim Higgins played at prop in Wakefield Trinity's 13-12 victory over Wigan in the 1946 Challenge Cup Final during the 1945–46 season at Wembley Stadium, London on Saturday 4 May 1946, in front of a crowd of 54,730.

=== County Cup Final appearances ===
Jim Higgins played at prop in Wakefield Trinity's 2-5 defeat by Bradford Northern in the 1945 Yorkshire Cup Final during the 1945–46 season at Thrum Hall, Halifax on Saturday 3 November 1945, played at prop in the 10–0 victory over Hull F.C. in the 1946 Yorkshire Cup Final during the 1946–47 season at Headingley, Leeds on Saturday 31 November 1946, played at prop in the 7–7 draw with Leeds in the 1947 Yorkshire Cup Final during the 1947–48 season at Fartown Ground, Huddersfield on Saturday 1 November 1947, and played at prop in the 8–7 victory over Leeds in the 1947 Yorkshire Cup Final replay during the 1947–48 season at Odsal Stadium, Bradford on Wednesday 5 November 1947.

=== Contemporaneous Article Extract ===
"Formerly a centre with Greenacres Junior side, he joined Trinity in 1945 from St. Mary's Juniors (Oldham) and immediately became first-choice blind-side prop forward. It was a position he held regularly for eight seasons in which he gave great service and consistent endeavour."
