= 1945–46 Challenge Cup =

Rugby league competition

- Duration: 5 rounds
- Number of teams: 32
- Highest attendance: 54,730
- Winners: Wakefield Trinity
- Runners-up: Wigan

The 1945–46 Challenge Cup was the 45th staging of rugby league's oldest knockout competition, the Challenge Cup.

The final was contested by Wakefield Trinity and Wigan at Wembley Stadium in London. This was the first Challenge Cup to be held after the Second World War, and the final reverted to a one-leg format held at Wembley.

The final was played on Saturday 4 May 1946, where Wakefield Trinity beat Wigan 13–12 in front of a crowd of 54,730.

1945-1946

== First round ==
| Date | Team one | Score one | Team two | Score two |
|---|---|---|---|---|
| 9 Feb | Bradford Northern | 11 | Hull FC | 0 |
| 9 Feb | Castleford | 10 | St Helens | 4 |
| 9 Feb | Dewsbury | 0 | Hunslet | 5 |
| 9 Feb | Featherstone Rovers | 7 | Halifax | 10 |
| 9 Feb | Higher Ince | 3 | Widnes | 30 |
| 9 Feb | Huddersfield | 3 | Wakefield Trinity | 14 |
| 9 Feb | Hull Juniors | 0 | Bramley | 29 |
| 9 Feb | Hull Kingston Rovers | 18 | Langworthy Jrs | 0 |
| 9 Feb | Keighley | 5 | Liverpool | 0 |
| 9 Feb | Kells | 0 | Warrington | 3 |
| 9 Feb | Leeds | 10 | Batley | 2 |
| 9 Feb | Rochdale Hornets | 9 | Barrow | 11 |
| 9 Feb | Salford | 8 | Oldham | 3 |
| 9 Feb | Sharlston Rovers | 12 | Workington Town | 7 |
| 9 Feb | Swinton | 5 | Wigan | 4 |
| 9 Feb | York | 6 | Belle Vue Rangers | 13 |
| 16 Feb | Barrow | 21 | Rochdale Hornets | 5 |
| 16 Feb | Batley | 8 | Leeds | 29 |
| 16 Feb | Belle Vue Rangers | 14 | York | 2 |
| 16 Feb | Bramley | 51 | Hull Juniors | 3 |
| 16 Feb | Halifax | 18 | Featherstone Rovers | 15 |
| 16 Feb | Hull FC | 2 | Bradford Northern | 0 |
| 16 Feb | Hunslet | 0 | Dewsbury | 2 |
| 16 Feb | Langworthy Jrs | 7 | Hull Kingston Rovers | 14 |
| 16 Feb | Liverpool | 7 | Keighley | 5 |
| 16 Feb | Oldham | 2 | Salford | 3 |
| 16 Feb | St Helens | 14 | Castleford | 5 |
| 16 Feb | Wakefield Trinity | 5 | Huddersfield | 2 |
| 16 Feb | Warrington | 27 | Kells | 0 |
| 16 Feb | Widnes | 42 | Higher Ince | 3 |
| 16 Feb | Wigan | 14 | Swinton | 2 |
| 16 Feb | Workington Town | 16 | Sharlston Rovers | 2 |

== Second round ==
| Date | Team one | Score one | Team two | Score two |
|---|---|---|---|---|
| 2 Mar | Bramley | 8 | Warrington | 2 |
| 2 Mar | Hull Kingston Rovers | 0 | Salford | 0 |
| 2 Mar | Hunslet | 18 | Belle Vue Rangers | 2 |
| 2 Mar | St Helens | 6 | Workington Town | 13 |
| 2 Mar | Wakefield Trinity | 10 | Halifax | 0 |
| 2 Mar | Widnes | 8 | Leeds | 2 |
| 2 Mar | Wigan | 37 | Keighley | 0 |
| 6 Mar | Salford | 38 | Hull Kingston Rovers | 6 |
| 7 Mar | Barrow | 5 | Bradford Northern | 0 |

== Quarterfinals ==
| Date | Team one | Score one | Team two | Score two |
|---|---|---|---|---|
| 16 Mar | Barrow | 3 | Wigan | 13 |
| 16 Mar | Bramley | 5 | Widnes | 11 |
| 16 Mar | Salford | 8 | Hunslet | 15 |
| 16 Mar | Wakefield Trinity | 14 | Workington Town | 4 |

== Semifinals ==
| Date | Team one | Score one | Team two | Score two |
|---|---|---|---|---|
| 30 Mar | Hunslet | 3 | Wakefield Trinity | 7 |
| 30 Mar | Wigan | 12 | Widnes | 5 |

== Final ==
4 May 1946

| Wakefield Trinity | 13 – 12 | Wigan |
|---|---|---|
| Try: Stott (2), Croston; Goal: Stott (2) | Report | Try: Nordgren (2), J. Blan, Jolley |

Wembley Stadium, London
Attendance: 54,730
Referee: A. Hill (Wakefield)
Player of the Match: Billy Stott

| FB | 1 | Billy Teall |
| RW | 2 | Ron Rylance |
| RC | 3 | Billy Stott |
| LC | 4 | Jim Croston |
| LW | 5 | Dennis Baddeley |
| SO | 6 | Johnny Jones |
| SH | 7 | Harry Goodfellow |
| PR | 8 | Harry Wilkinson |
| HK | 9 | Len Marson |
| PR | 10 | Jim Higgins |
| SR | 11 | Mick Exley |
| SR | 12 | Derek Howes |
| LF | 13 | Len Bratley |

| FB | 1 | Jack Cunliffe |
| RW | 2 | Brian Nordgren |
| RC | 3 | Gordon Ratcliffe |
| LC | 4 | Ernie Ashcroft |
| LW | 5 | Stan Jolley |
| SO | 6 | Reg Lowrey |
| SH | 7 | Tommy Bradshaw |
| PR | 8 | George Banks |
| HK | 9 | Jack Blan |
| PR | 10 | Frank Barton |
| SR | 11 | Harry Atkinson |
| SR | 12 | Eddie Watkins |
| LF | 13 | Billy Blan |
