= Teall =

Teall may refer to:

== People ==
- Alfred Teall, English missionary
- Billy Teall (1914–?), English rugby league football player
- Francis A. Teall (1822–1894), American editor
- Jethro Teall (1849–1924), British geologist and petrographist

== Places ==
- Cape Teall
- Teall Island
- Teall Nunatak
