= 1945–46 Yorkshire Cup =

- Structure: Regional knockout championship
- Teams: 15
- Winners: Bradford Northern
- Runners-up: Wakefield Trinity

The 1945–46 Yorkshire Cup was the thirty-eighth occasion on which the Yorkshire Cup competition was held.

In this, the first peacetime Cup final for five years, there was a new name on the trophy. Bradford Northern, who previously won the trophy in 1940–41, 1941–42 and 1943–44, could now lay claim to a genuine trophy; the wartime competitions were not counted officially in the records. Bradford Northern won by beating Wakefield Trinity by a score of 5–2.

The match was played at Thrum Hall, Halifax, now in West Yorkshire. The attendance was 24,252 and receipts were £1,934.

== Background ==
The Second World War was now over, and things were beginning to return to normal, although there was still a long way to go. Hull Kingston Rovers and Bramley re-joined the competition and the four Lancashire clubs returned to their own competition. This season there were no junior/amateur clubs taking part, which resulted in the number of entrants falling by two, leaving the total number of entries at 15.

This in turn resulted in one bye in the first round.

The competition reverted to its original formula of a knock-out tournament, with the exception of the first round, which was still played on a two-legged home and away basis.

== Competition and results ==
=== Round 1 – first leg ===
Round 1's first leg involved seven matches (with one bye) and 15 clubs.

All first round ties were played on a two-legged home and away basis.

Game no.	Fixture date	Home team	Score	Away team	Venue	Agg	Att	Rec	Notes	Ref
1	Sat 6 Oct 1945	Batley	5–21	Hunslet	Mount Pleasant					
2	Sat 6 Oct 1945	Bramley	14–22	Keighley	Barley Mow					
3	Sat 6 Oct 1945	Halifax	18–5	Hull	Thrum Hall					
4	Sat 6 Oct 1945	Hull Kingston Rovers	5–4	Dewsbury	Craven Park (1)					
5	Sat 6 Oct 1945	Leeds	11–4	Castleford	Headingley					
6	Sat 6 Oct 1945	Wakefield Trinity	20–5	Huddersfield	Belle Vue					
7	Sat 6 Oct 1945	York	?	Featherstone Rovers	Clarence Street					
8		Bradford Northern		bye						

=== Round 1 – second leg ===
Round 1's second leg involved seven matches (with one bye) and 15 clubs.

All first round ties were played on a two-legged home and away basis.

Game no.	Fixture date	Home team	Score	Away team	Venue	agg	Att	Rec	Notes	Ref
1	Sat 13 Oct 1945	Hunslet	19–0	Batley	Parkside	40–5				
2	Sat 13 Oct 1945	Keighley	17–15	Bramley	Lawkholme Lane	39–29				
3	Sat 13 Oct 1945	Hull	30–5	Halifax	Boulevard	35–23				
4	Sat 13 Oct 1945	Dewsbury	20–4	Hull Kingston Rovers	Crown Flatt	24–9				
5	Sat 13 Oct 1945	Castleford	11–10	Leeds	Wheldon Road	15–21				
6	Sat 13 Oct 1945	Huddersfield	7–32	Wakefield Trinity	Fartown	12–52				
7	Sat 13 Oct 1945	Featherstone Rovers	24–5	York	Post Office Road	?				
8		Bradford Northern		bye						

=== Round 2 – quarterfinals ===
Round 2's quarterfinals involved four matches and eight clubs.

All second round ties were played on a two-legged home and away basis.

Game no.	Fixture date	Home team	Score	Away team	Venue	Agg	Att	Rec	Notes	Ref
1	Tue 16 Oct 1945	Dewsbury	10–3	Keighley	Crown Flatt					
2	Wed 17 Oct 1945	Wakefield Trinity	34–7	Hull	Belle Vue				(Note: The date is given by RUGBYLEAGUEproject as Tuesday 16 October, but by the official Hull F.C. archives as Wednesday 17 October.)	
3	Wed 17 Oct 1945	Bradford Northern	8–0	Hunslet	Odsal					
4	Wed 17 Oct 1945	Leeds	11–4	Featherstone Rovers	Headingley					

=== Round 3 – semifinals ===
Round 3's semifinals involved two matches and four clubs.

Both semi-final ties were played on a two-legged home and away basis.

Game no.	Fixture date	Home team	Score	Away team	Venue	Agg	Att	Rec	Notes	Ref
1	Tue 23 Oct 1945	Dewsbury	2–7	Bradford Northern	Crown Flatt					
2	Wed 24 Oct 1945	Wakefield Trinity	14–7	Leeds	Belle Vue					

=== Final ===
Game no.	Fixture date	Home team	Score	Away team	Venue	Agg	Att	Rec	Notes	Ref
	Saturday 3 November 1945	Bradford Northern	5–2	Wakefield Trinity	Thrum Hall		24252	£1,934	(Note: Thrum Hall was the home ground of Halifax with a final capacity of 9,832 (The attendance record of 29,153 was set on 21 March 1959 for a third round Challenge Cup tie v Wigan). The club finally moved out in 1998 to take part ownership and ground-share with Halifax Town A.F.C. at The Shay Stadium.)	

==== Teams and scorers ====
Bradford Northern	No.	Wakefield Trinity
	Teams	
George Carmichael	1	William "Billy" Teall
Eric Batten	2	Ronnie Copley
Jack Kitching	3	William "Billy" Stott
Ernest Ward	4	Johnny Jones
Walter Best	5	Dennis Baddeley
George Bennett	6	Ronald "Ron" Rylance
Donald Ward	7	Herbert "Harry" Goodfellow
Frank Whitcombe	8	Harry Wilkinson
Vic Darlison	9	Leonard "Len" Marson
Leonard Higson	10	James "Jim" Higgins
Laurie Roberts	11	Harry Murphy
Alf Marklew	12	Frank Moore
William Hutchinson	13	Leonard "Len" Bratley
Dai Rees	Coach	James "Jim" Croston
5	Score	2
0	HT	2
	Scorers	
	Tries	
Frank Whitcombe	T	
	Goals	
George Carmichael	G	William "Billy" Stott
Referee		unknown

Scoring – Try = three (3) points – Goal = two (2) points – Drop goal = two (2) points

=== The road to success ===
All the ties in the first round were played on a two leg (home and away) basis.

For the first round ties, the first club named in each of the ties played the first leg at home.

For the first round ties, the scores shown are the aggregate score over the two legs.

First round
Hull Kingston Rovers	9
Dewsbury	24
Bramley	29
Keighley	39
Bradford Northern
bye
Batley	5
Hunslet	40
Wakefield Trinity	52
Huddersfield	12
Halifax	23
Hull	35
Leeds	21
Castleford	15
York	L
Featherstone Rovers	W

Second round
Dewsbury	10
Keighley	3
Bradford Northern	8
Hunslet	0
Wakefield Trinity	34
Hull	7
Leeds	11
Featherstone Rovers	4

Semifinals
Dewsbury	2
Bradford Northern	7
Wakefield Trinity	14
Leeds	7

Final
Bradford Northern	5
Wakefield Trinity	2

== See also ==
- 1945–46 Northern Rugby Football League season
- Rugby league county cups
