= Arthur Fletcher (disambiguation) =

Arthur Fletcher is an American government official and the "Father of Affirmative Action".

Arthur Fletcher may also refer to:

- Arthur Fletcher (rugby league), English professional rugby league footballer
- Art Fletcher (1885–1950), American professional baseball player and manager
- Sir Arthur George Murchison Fletcher, Governor of Fiji
