= 1939–40 Yorkshire Cup =

- Structure: Regional knockout championship
- Teams: 12
- Winners: Featherstone Rovers
- Runners-up: Wakefield Trinity

The 1939–40 Yorkshire Cup was the thirty-second occasion on which the Yorkshire Cup competition had been held.

The competition was a knock-out competition between (mainly professional) rugby league clubs from the county of Yorkshire. The actual area was at times increased to encompass other teams from outside the county such as Newcastle, Mansfield, Coventry, and even London (in the form of Acton & Willesden). The competition always took place early in the season, in the Autumn, with the final taking place in (or just before) December (The only exception to this was when disruption of the fixture list was caused during, and immediately after, the two World Wars, as was the case with this season)

Due to the start of the Second World War, the competition was delayed until early 1940.

This season's competition is classed as a "Wartime Emergency Competition" and therefore the results did not count as an official competition win. However, this aside, there was a new winner for this season's trophy, Featherstone Rovers winning the trophy by beating Wakefield Trinity by the score of 12–9 in the final. The match was played at Odsal in the City of Bradford, now in West Yorkshire. The attendance was 7,077 and receipts were £403

Unlike the 1939–40 Lancashire Cup, the Yorkshire cup was played on a straightforward knock-out basis, and not on a two-legged basis.

== Preamble to changes ==
Prior to the declaration of war on 3 September 1939, most clubs had played two or three fixtures (on Saturday 26th, Thursday 31 August and Saturday 2 September).

During the following week, the Northern Rugby League decided, after publicity from the Government, to suspend the championship. They almost immediately inaugurated two regional (Lancashire and Yorkshire), Wartime Emergency Leagues, with the winner of each league meeting in a play-off final to decide the overall winner. The Challenge Cup and both County Cups were suspended. There was to be no Yorkshire Cup competition in 1939.

But later in the season both County Cups were resurrected.

The Yorkshire Cup started on Saturday 25 May/1 June and was played on consecutive weekends.

Each and every match was played on a knock-out basis.

=== Background ===
Batley, Bramley and Keighley, (the three clubs who finishing as the bottom three in the Yorkshire League) did not appear to enter this year's competition. All had competed in the league programme, and all competed again next season The number of teams entering this year’s competition therefore decreased by three reducing the total number of entrants to twelve.

This in turn resulted in four byes in the first round.

== Competition and results ==
=== Round 1 ===
Involved 4 matches (with four byes) and 12 clubs

Game No	Fixture date	Home team	Score	Away team	Venue	Ref
1	Sat 25 May 1940	Dewsbury	23–14	York	Crown Flatt	
2	Sat 1 Jun 1940	Bradford Northern	22–3	Leeds	Odsal	
3	Sat 1 Jun 1940	Castleford	17–10	Hunslet	Wheldon Road	
4	Sat 1 Jun 1940	Featherstone Rovers	18–2	Halifax	Post Office Road	
5		Huddersfield		bye (Note: Batley, Bramley and Keighley, (the three clubs who finishing as the bottom three in the Yorkshire League) did not appear to enter this year's competition)		
6		Hull		bye		
7		Hull Kingston Rovers		bye		
8		Wakefield Trinity		bye		

=== Round 2 - quarterfinals ===
Involved 4 matches and 8 clubs

Game No	Fixture date	Home team	Score	Away team	Venue	Ref
1	Sat 8 Jun 1940	Castleford	6–12	Hull Kingston Rovers	Wheldon Road	
2	Sat 8 Jun 1940	Featherstone Rovers	21–6	Bradford Northern	Post Office Road	
3	Sat 8 Jun 1940	Huddersfield	9–23	Dewsbury	Fartown	
4	Sat 8 Jun 1940	Wakefield Trinity	27–3	Hull	Belle Vue	

=== Round 3 – semifinals ===
Involved 2 matches and 4 clubs

Game No	Fixture date	Home team	Score	Away team	Venue	Ref
1	Sat 15 Jun 1940	Featherstone Rovers	15–11	Dewsbury	Post Office Road	
2	Sat 15 Jun 1940	Hull Kingston Rovers	5–5	Wakefield Trinity	Craven Park (1)	

=== Semifinal - replays ===
Involved 1 match and 2 clubs

Game No	Fixture date	Home team	Score	Away team	Venue	Ref
R	Wed 19 Jun 1940	Wakefield Trinity	8–7	Hull Kingston Rovers	Belle Vue	

=== Final ===
Game No	Fixture date	Home team	Score	Away team	Venue	Att	Rec	Notes	Ref
	Saturday 22 June 1940	Featherstone Rovers	12–9	Wakefield Trinity	Odsal	7,077	£403		

==== Teams and scorers ====
Featherstone Rovers	No.	Wakefield Trinity
	teams	
John Haley	1	William "Billy" Teall
Albany Longley	2	Reg Jenkinson
Walter Tennant	3	Horace Turner
Bill Hughes	4	Robert "Bob" Oliver
Jack Blackburn	5	George Henry "Mick" Exley
Ray Hamer	6	Sam Herberts
Harold Moxon	7	Herbert "Harry" Goodfellow
Frank Hemingway	8	Harry Wilkinson
Joe Golby	9	Victor "Vic" Darlison
John "Jack" Dyson	10	Harry Nicholson
Wilf Pearson	11	Sandy Orford
George Taylor	12	Alan Flowers
Bill Sherwood	13	Leonard "Len" Marson
xBilly Williams	Coach	??
12	score	9
3	HT	7
	Scorers	
	Tries	
2	T	Horace Turner (1)
	T	
	Goals	
3	G	William "Billy" Teall (3)
	G	
	Drop Goals	
	DG	
Referee		unknown

Scoring - Try = three (3) points - Goal = two (2) points - Drop goal = two (2) points

=== The road to success ===
First round
Featherstone Rovers	18
Halifax	2
Bradford Northern	22
Leeds	3
Huddersfield
bye
Dewsbury	23
York	14
Castleford	17
Hunslet	10
Hull Kingston Rovers
bye
Wakefield Trinity
bye
Hull
bye

Second round
Featherstone Rovers	21
Bradford Northern	6
Huddersfield	9
Dewsbury	23
Castleford	6
Hull Kingston Rovers	12
Wakefield Trinity	3
Hull

Semifinals
Featherstone Rovers	15
Dewsbury	11
Hull Kingston Rovers	5 (7)
Wakefield Trinity	5 (8)

Final
Featherstone Rovers	12
Wakefield Trinity	9

== See also ==
- 1939–40 Northern Rugby Football League Wartime Emergency League season
- Rugby league county cups
