= Thomas Johnson (rugby league) =

England international rugby league footballer

Tommy Johnson
Personal information
- Full name: Thomas Albert Johnson
- Born: unknown
- Died: unknown

Playing information
- Position: Scrum-half
Club
Years	Team	Pld	T	G	FG	P
1936–47	Hull FC	129	21	1	0	65
Representative
Years	Team	Pld	T	G	FG	P
1941	England	1	0	0	0	0

Thomas "Tommy" A Johnson (birth unknown – death unknown) was an English professional rugby league footballer who played in the 1930s and 1940s. He played at representative level for England, and at club level for Hull FC, as a scrum-half.

== Playing career ==
=== Club career ===
Johnson played scrum-half in Hull FC's 10-18 defeat by Huddersfield in the 1938–39 Yorkshire Cup Final during the 1938–39 season at Odsal Stadium, Bradford on Saturday 22 October 1938, and played scrum-half in the 0-10 defeat by Wakefield Trinity in the 1946–47 Yorkshire Cup Final during the 1946–47 season at Headingley Stadium on Saturday 31 November 1946.

=== International honours ===
Johnson won a cap for England while at Hull in 1941 against Wales.
