= Geoff Clark =

Geoff Clark or Geoffrey Clark may refer to:

- Geoff Clark (politician) (born 1952), Australian Aboriginal politician and activist
- Geoff Clark (rugby league) (1920–2008), English rugby league footballer
- Geoffrey Clark (water polo) (born 1969), Australian water polo player
- Geoffrey James Clark (born 1981), American film and television producer

== See also ==
- Jeff Clark (disambiguation)
- Jeff Clarke (disambiguation)
