= Derek Howes =

Wales international rugby league footballer

Personal information
- Full name: William J. Derek Howes
- Born: first ¼ 1913 Pontardawe district, Wales

Playing information
- Height: 5 ft 10 in (178 cm)
- Weight: 12 st 10 lb (81 kg)

Rugby union
Club
Years	Team	Pld	T	G	FG	P
≤1945–45	Llanelli RFC

Rugby league
- Position: Second-row, Loose forward
Club
Years	Team	Pld	T	G	FG	P
1945–53	Wakefield Trinity	179	45	1	0	137
1953–54/55	Featherstone Rovers	27	1	0	0	3
	Total	206	46	1	0	140
Representative
Years	Team	Pld	T	G	FG	P
1948–50	Wales	5	0	0	0	0

William J. Derek Howes (first ¼ 1913 – death unknown) was a Welsh rugby union and professional rugby league footballer who played in the 1940s and 1950s. He played club level rugby union (RU) for Llanelli RFC, and representative level rugby league (RL) for Wales, and at club level for Wakefield Trinity and Featherstone Rovers, as a second-row or loose forward.

== Background ==
Derek Howes' birth was registered in Pontardawe district, Wales.

== Playing career ==
=== International honours ===
Derek Howes won 5 caps for Wales (RL) while at Wakefield Trinity from 1948 to 1950.

=== Challenge Cup Final appearances ===
Derek Howes played at second-row in Wakefield Trinity's 13–12 victory over Wigan in the 1946 Challenge Cup Final during the 1945–46 season Challenge Cup Final at Wembley Stadium, London on Saturday 4 May 1946, in front of a crowd of 54,730.

=== County Cup Final appearances ===
Derek Howes played at second-row in Wakefield Trinity's 17–3 victory over Keighley in the 1951 Yorkshire Cup Final during the 1951–52 season at Fartown Ground, Huddersfield on Saturday 27 October 1951.

=== Club career ===
Derek Howes made his début for Wakefield Trinity during November 1945, he made his début for Featherstone Rovers on 19 September 1953.
