= John Dennis Boocker =

Wales international rugby league footballer

Dennis Boocker

Personal information
- Full name: John Dennis Boocker
- Born: 22 November 1922; Ystrad, Rhondda, Wales
- Died: 8 June 1987 (aged 65); Kurri Kurri, New South Wales, Australia

Playing information
- Position: Wing, Centre
Club
Years	Team	Pld	T	G	FG	P
	Kurri Kurri
1946	Newtown	13	10	0	0	30
1947–54	Wakefield Trinity	221	127	16	0	393
	Total	234	137	16	0	423
Representative
Years	Team	Pld	T	G	FG	P
1945–47	Country NSW	≥2
1948–50	Wales	5	0	0	0	0

John Dennis Boocker (22 November 1922 – 8 June 1987), also known by the nickname of "Dinny", was a Welsh professional rugby league footballer who played in the 1940s and 1950s. He played at representative level for Wales and Country New South Wales (Australia), and at club level for Kurri Kurri Bulldogs, Newtown Bluebags and Wakefield Trinity, as a wing or centre.

== Background ==
John Dennis Boocker was born in Ystrad, Wales (birth registered in Pontypridd district), emigrating to Australia on 9 July 1925 and he died aged 65 in Kurri Kurri, Australia.

Boocker played in Kurri Kurri's 1945 premiership win. In 2010 he was named at centre in Kurri Rugby League Club's team of the century.

== Playing career ==
=== International honours ===
Dennis Boocker was selected for Wales whilst at Wakefield Trinity during the 1948/49 and 1949/50 seasons.

=== County Cup Final appearances ===
Dennis Boocker played at centre in Wakefield Trinity's 7–7 draw with Leeds in the 1947 Yorkshire Cup Final during the 1947–48 season at Fartown Ground, Huddersfield on Saturday 1 November 1947, played at centre in Wakefield Trinity's 8–7 victory over Leeds in the 1947 Yorkshire Cup Final replay during the 1947–48 season at Odsal Stadium, Bradford on Wednesday 5 November 1947, and played on the wing in the 17–3 victory over Keighley in the 1951 Yorkshire Cup Final during the 1951–52 season at Fartown Ground, Huddersfield on Saturday 27 October 1951.

=== Club career ===
Dennis Boocker made his début for Wakefield Trinity, and scored a try in the 15–8 victory over Salford at Belle Vue, Wakefield on Saturday 25 October 1947, he is second on Wakefield Trinity's all-time tries scored in a season list, scoring 32-tries in 1953–54 Northern Rugby Football League season, a record later extended to 38-tries by Fred Smith and David Smith.

== Contemporaneous Article Extract ==
A typical action picture of Denis Boocker taken during Trinity's game with Belle Vue Rangers in August 1935, when the Welsh-Australian scored four tries. It shows the famous "swallow-dive" which Boocker used so effectively on many of his try-scoring occasions. Born in Gelli, Wales, Booker (sic) emigrated to Australia two years later. Commenced his football career with Karri-Karri (sic) at seventeen. After four years in the Forces he joined the Newtown Club from where Trinity signed him in 1947. He made his début for Trinity on 25 October 1947, against Salford at Belle Vue. After a period as centre-threequarter he tried the wing position and soon proved himself one of the best in the game. Made five appearances for Wales, including one against Australia. Extended the club try-scoring record just prior to his return "down under" in April 1954 – and he left in Wakefield many friends and exciting memories.
