= Jim Higgins =

Jim Higgins may refer to:

- Jim Higgins (basketball) (1918–2002), American professional basketball player
- Jim Higgins (boxer) (1897–1964), Scottish boxer of the 1910s, 1920s and 1930s
- Jim Higgins (British politician) (1930–2002), British revolutionary socialist
- Jim Higgins (ice hockey), American retired ice hockey player and coach
- Jim Higgins (Irish politician) (born 1945), Irish Fine Gael politician, served in Seanad Éireann, Dáil Éireann and the European Parliament
- Jim Higgins (footballer) (born 1926), Irish soccer player
- Jim Higgins (luger) (born 1936), American Olympic luger
- Jim Higgins (rugby league) (born 1920s), professional rugby league footballer

== See also ==
- James Higgins (disambiguation)
