= Des Case =

Wales international rugby league & union player

- Full name: Desmond James Case
- Born: 20 June 1918 Newport, Wales
- Died: 2 February 1997 (aged 78) Blaenau Gwent, Wales

Rugby union career
- Position: wing
Senior career
Years	Team	Apps	(Points)
- Cross Keys RFC
1937-38	Newport RFC	1	
- Rugby league career

Playing information
- Position: Wing, Centre
Club
Years	Team	Pld	T	G	FG	P
≤1938–≥48	Bradford Northern	193	79	10
194?	→Castleford (guest)
	Total	193	79	10	0	0
Representative
Years	Team	Pld	T	G	FG	P
1938–47	Wales	4	2			6
1942	Northern Command XIII	1	0	0	0	0

Desmond James Case (20 June 1918 – 2 February 1997) was a Welsh rugby union, and professional rugby league footballer who played in the 1930s and 1940s. He played club level rugby union (RU) for Cross Keys RFC and Newport RFC, and representative level rugby league (RL) for Wales, and at club level for Bradford Northern and Castleford (as a wartime guest), as a wing, or centre. Case was a sergeant major in the British Army during World War II.

Case died in Blaenau Gwent on 2 February 1997, at the age of 78.

== Playing career ==
=== International honours ===
Case won 4 caps for Wales in 1938–1947 while at Bradford Northern.

=== Championship final appearances ===
Case played in Bradford Northern's 5–15 defeat by Warrington in the Championship Final during the 1947–48 season at Maine Road, Manchester on Saturday 8 May 1948.

=== Challenge Cup Final appearances ===
Case played at centre in Bradford Northern's 3–8 defeat by Wigan in the 1947–48 Challenge Cup Final during the 1947–48 season at Wembley Stadium, London on Saturday 1 May 1948.

=== Other notable matches ===
Case played on the wing for Northern Command XIII against a Rugby League XIII at Thrum Hall, Halifax on Saturday 21 March 1942.
