= Glyn Morgan =

Glyn Morgan may refer to:

- Glyn Morgan (rugby)
- Glyn Morgan (swimmer)
