= Sandy Orford =

Welsh wrestler, and rugby league footballer

Personal information
- Full name: Edwin James Orford
- Born: 5 December 1911 Pontypool district, Wales
- Died: April 1986 (aged 75)

Playing information
- Position: Second-row
Club
Years	Team	Pld	T	G	FG	P
1929–35	Dewsbury	106
1935–39	Bradford Northern	117	10	0	0	30
1939–47	Wakefield Trinity	177	17	0	0	51
1941–43	→ Bradford Northern (guest)	5	2	0	0	6
1947–49	Bradford Northern	16	0	0	0	0
	Total	421	29	0	0	87
Representative
Years	Team	Pld	T	G	FG	P
1939–44	Wales	4	0	0	0	0

Edwin James "Sandy" Orford (5 December 1911 – April 1986) was a Welsh professional wrestler of the 1940s and 1950s, wrestling trainer of the 1950s and 1960s, and professional rugby league footballer who played in the 1920s, 1930s and 1940s. He played at representative level for Wales, and at club level for Dewsbury and Bradford Northern (three spells, including one as a World War II guest), and Wakefield Trinity, as a second-row.

== Background ==
Sandy Orford's birth was registered in Pontypool district, Wales, and he died aged c. 74–75.

== Playing career ==
=== International honours ===
Sandy Orford won 4 caps for Wales in 1939–1944 while at Wakefield Trinity.

=== County Cup Final appearances ===
Sandy Orford played at second-row in Wakefield Trinity's 9-12 defeat by Featherstone Rovers in the 1940 Yorkshire Cup Final during the 1939–40 season at Odsal Stadium, Bradford on Saturday 22 June 1940.

=== Other notable matches ===
Sandy Orford played at second-row for a Rugby League XIII against Northern Command XIII at Thrum Hall, Halifax on Saturday 21 March 1942.

=== Club career ===
Bradford Northern beat Dewsbury in the Championship play-off semi-final during the 1942–43 season. However, Dewsbury's manager, Eddie Waring, appealed to the Rugby Football League, claiming that Bradford Northern had fielded Wakefield Trinity's Sandy Orford as a guest player, and that Orford was ineligible because prior to the semi-final, he had played only three league matches for Bradford Northern, rather than the regulatory minimum of four league matches, the semi-final actually being Orford's fourth league match. Bradford Northern was disqualified, and Dewsbury went on to a 33-16 aggregate victory over Halifax in the Championship Final. However, a month later, Bradford appealed to the Rugby Football League, claiming that Dewsbury had fielded Castleford's Frank Smith as a guest player, and that Smith was ineligible because prior to the semi-final, he had played only three league matches for Dewsbury, rather than the regulatory minimum of four league matches, though he had played in a number of cup matches. Bradford Northern's appeal was upheld and the Rugby Football League Council fined Dewsbury £100 (based on increases in average earnings, this would be approximately £11,780 in 2013), stripped them of the Championship title, and declared the Championship during the 1942–43 season void.

== Professional wrestling ==
Sandy Orford became a professional wrestler during the 1940s, fighting 6-time world champion Lou Thesz on three occasions, with one draw and two losses, and defeating Shirley Crabtree (later known as "Big Daddy") on Crabtree's début by two falls to one at St James' Hall, Newcastle on Saturday 14 June 1952, he appeared as a masked wrestler, first as the Black Angel and latterly as The Mask, he also trained Shirley Crabtree, and Colin Williamson.

== Personal life ==
Sandy Orford is the father of the professional wrestler Tony Orford.
