= John Booth (rugby league) =

English rugby league footballer

Personal information
- Full name: John Booth
- Born: c. 1920 unknown

Playing information
- Position: Prop, Second-row
Club
| Years | Team | Pld | T | G | FG | P |
|---|---|---|---|---|---|---|
| 1946–56 | Wakefield Trinity | 257 | 33 | 16 | 0 | 393 |
Representative
| Years | Team | Pld | T | G | FG | P |
| 1947/48–51/52 | Yorkshire | ≥3 |

John "Jack" Booth (birth unknown) is an English former professional rugby league footballer who played in the 1940s and 1950s. He played at representative level for Great Britain (non-Test matches) Yorkshire, and at club level for Wakefield Trinity, as a prop or second-row.

== Playing career ==
=== International honours ===
Jack Booth played at prop and scored a try, in Great Britain's 20–23 defeat by Australasia (comprising British-based Australians and New Zealanders) in the Festival of Britain match at Headingley, Leeds on Saturday 19 May 1951.

=== County Honours ===
Jack Booth was selected for Yorkshire County XIII whilst at Wakefield Trinity during the 1947–48, 1950–51 and 1951–52 seasons.

=== County Cup Final appearances ===
Jack Booth played at second-row in Wakefield Trinity’s 7–7 draw with Leeds in the 1947 Yorkshire Cup Final during the 1947–48 season at Fartown Ground, Huddersfield on Saturday 1 November 1947, played at second-row in the 8–7 victory over Leeds in the 1947 Yorkshire Cup Final replay during the 1947–48 season at Odsal Stadium, Bradford on Wednesday 5 November 1947, and played at prop in the 17–3 victory over Keighley in the 1951 Yorkshire Cup Final during the 1951–52 season at Fartown Ground, Huddersfield on Saturday 27 October 1951.

=== Club career ===
Jack Booth made his début for Wakefield Trinity during November 1946.

=== Testimonial match ===
Jack Booth's Testimonial match at Wakefield Trinity took place against a Lionel Cooper Select XIII on Wednesday 28 April 1954.
