= Frank Hemingway =

English rugby league footballer

Personal information
- Full name: Frank Hemingway
- Born: c. 1915 Sharlston, England
- Died: 25 April 1991 (aged 76) Wakefield, England

Playing information
- Position: Prop
Club
Years	Team	Pld	T	G	FG	P
1934–51	Featherstone Rovers	361	5	2	0	19
1942 (guest)	→ Wakefield Trinity	1	0	0	0	19
	Total	362	5	2	0	38
- Relatives: Ian Slater (grandson)

Frank Hemingway was a professional rugby league footballer who played in the 1930s, 1940s and 1950s. He played at club level for Featherstone Rovers and Wakefield Trinity (World War II guest), as a prop.

== Playing career ==
Hemingway made his début for Featherstone Rovers on Saturday 10 November 1934, and made his début for Wakefield Trinity during January 1942.

=== County Cup Final appearances ===
Hemingway played at prop in Featherstone Rovers' 12-9 victory over Wakefield Trinity in the 1939–40 Yorkshire Cup Final during the 1939–40 season at Odsal Stadium, Bradford on Saturday 22 June 1940.

=== Testimonial match ===
Hemingway's benefit season at Featherstone Rovers took place during the 1949–50 season.

== Genealogical information ==
Frank Hemingway was the Grandfather of the rugby league footballer who played in the 1980s; Ian Slater.
