= Jeff Clark =

Jeff or Jeffrey Clark may refer to:

- Jeff Clark (surfer) (born 1957), American surfer
- Jeff Clark (designer) (born 1971), American poet and book designer
- Jeff Clark (musician), bassist, former member of the American hardcore punk band Death by Stereo
- Jeff Ray Clark, American economist and academic
- Jeffrey Clark (born 1967), former Assistant Attorney General during the Trump administration
- Jeffrey Clark, an American member of the neo-Nazi group Atomwaffen Division
- Jeffrey Cameron Clark, convicted murderer

== See also ==
- Jeff Clarke (disambiguation)
- Geoff Clark (disambiguation)
