= Jeff Clarke =

Jeff or Jeffrey Clarke may refer to:

- Jeff Clarke (businessman) (born 1961), American businessman
- Jeff Clarke (Canadian soccer) (born 1977), Canadian soccer player
- Jeff Clarke (English footballer) (born 1954), English footballer

== See also ==
- Geoff Clark (disambiguation)
- Jeff Clark (disambiguation)
