= Jack Blackburn (rugby league) =

English rugby league footballer

Personal information
- Full name: Jack Blackburn

Playing information
- Position: Wing
Club
Years	Team	Pld	T	G	FG	P
1939–53	Featherstone Rovers	139	30	38	0	166

Jack Blackburn (born c.1919) was a professional rugby league footballer who played in the 1930s, 1940s and 1950s. He played at club level for Featherstone Rovers, as an occasional goal-kicking wing.

== Playing career ==
Blackburn made his début for Featherstone Rovers on Saturday 16 December 1939.

=== County Cup Final appearances ===
Blackburn played on the wing in Featherstone Rovers' 12-9 victory over Wakefield Trinity in the 1939–40 Yorkshire Cup Final during the 1939–40 season at Odsal Stadium, Bradford on Saturday 22 June 1940.

=== Testimonial match ===
Blackburn's benefit season at Featherstone Rovers, shared with Jimmy Russell, took place during the 1951–52 season.
