= Wilf Pearson =

English rugby league footballer

Personal information
- Full name: Wilfred Pearson

Playing information
- Position: Second-row
Club
Years	Team	Pld	T	G	FG	P
1937–44	Featherstone Rovers	155	14	0	0	42

Wilf Pearson was a professional rugby league footballer who played in the 1930s and 1940s. He played at club level for Featherstone Rovers (captain).

== Playing career ==
Pearson made his début for Featherstone Rovers on Saturday 2 October 1937.

=== County Cup Final appearances ===
Pearson played at second-row in Featherstone Rovers' 12-9 victory over Wakefield Trinity in the 1939–40 Yorkshire Cup Final during the 1939–40 season at Odsal Stadium, Bradford on Saturday 22 June 1940.

=== Testimonial match ===
Pearson's benefit season at Featherstone Rovers took place during the 1940–41 season.
