= Ian Slater =

English rugby league footballer

Playing information
- Position: Stand-off
Club
Years	Team	Pld	T	G	FG	P
1975–78	Bradford Northern	60	22	1	0	68
1978–79	Leeds	7	4	0	0	12
1979–84	Huddersfield	81	37	18	0	151
1984–86	Featherstone Rovers	38	6	0	0	24
	Total	186	69	19	0	255
- Relatives: Frank Hemingway (grandfather)

Ian Slater is a former professional rugby league footballer who played in the 1980s. He played at club level for Huddersfield, Featherstone Rovers, and Bradford Northern, as a stand-off.

== Club career ==
Slater was signed by Huddersfield from Leeds in September 1979 for a club record fee of £10,000.

Slater made his début for Featherstone Rovers on Friday 9 March 1984.

== Genealogical information ==
Ian Slater is the grandson of the rugby league footballer who played in the 1930s, 1940s and 1950s; Frank Hemingway.
