= George Banks (rugby league) =

English rugby league footballer

Personal information
- Full name: George William Banks
- Born: third 1/4 1909; Castleford, England
- Died: unknown

Playing information
- Position: Prop
Club
Years	Team	Pld	T	G	FG	P
1929–31	Huddersfield	4
1931–35	Dewsbury	115
1935–36	Streatham & Mitcham	50
1936–48	Wigan	246	14	0		42
1940–42	→ Castleford (guest)	11	0	0		0
1948–49	York	28
	Total	454	14	0	0	42

George William Banks (c. 1909 – death unknown) was an English professional rugby league footballer who played in the 1920s, 1930s and 1940s. He played for Huddersfield, Dewsbury, Streatham & Mitcham, Wigan and York, he also appeared for his hometown club Castleford as a World War II guest, as a prop.

== Playing career ==
=== Championship final appearances ===
George Banks played at prop in Wigan's 13-4 victory over Huddersfield in the Championship Final during the 1945–46 season at Maine Road, Manchester on Saturday 18 May 1946, and played at prop in the 13-4 victory over Dewsbury in the Championship Final during the 1946–47 season at Maine Road, Manchester on Saturday 21 June 1947.

=== County Cup Final appearances ===
George Banks played at prop in Wigan's 10-7 victory over Salford in the 1938–39 Lancashire Cup Final during the 1938–39 season at Station Road, Swinton on Saturday 22 October 1938, played at prop in the 3-7 defeat by Widnes in the 1945–46 Lancashire Cup Final during the 1945–46 season at Wilderspool Stadium, Warrington on Saturday 27 October 1945, played at prop in the 9-3 victory over Belle Vue Rangers in the 1946–47 Lancashire Cup Final during the 1946–47 season at Station Road, Swinton on Saturday 26 October 1946, played at prop in the 10-7 victory over Belle Vue Rangers in the 1947–48 Lancashire Cup Final during the 1947–48 season at Wilderspool Stadium, Warrington on Saturday 1 November 1947,

=== Club career ===
Born in Castleford, Yorkshire, Banks started his professional career in 1929 with Huddersfield, who his brother, Thomas, also played for. He failed to establish a regular place in the first team, appearing just four times before moving to Dewsbury in 1931. He made 115 appearances for Dewsbury until 1935, when he moved to the newly formed London-based team Streatham & Mitcham. He appeared 50 times for the club before leaving to join Wigan.
