= Jimmy Russell (rugby league) =

English rugby league footballer

Personal information
- Full name: Jimmy Russell

Playing information
- Position: Scrum-half
Club
Years	Team	Pld	T	G	FG	P
1939–51/52	Featherstone Rovers	128	26	7	0	92

Jimmy Russell was a professional rugby league footballer who played in the 1930s, 1940s, and 1950s. He played at club level for Featherstone Rovers (captain), as an occasional goal-kicking scrum-half.

== Playing career ==
Russell made his début for Featherstone Rovers on Saturday 1 April 1939.

=== Testimonial match ===
Russell's benefit season at Featherstone Rovers, shared with Jack Blackburn, took place during the 1951–52 season.
