= Eddie Watkins =

Wales dual-code international rugby footballer

- Born: Edward Verdun Watkins; 2 March 1916 Caerphilly, Wales
- Died: 28 June 1995 (aged 79) Cardiff, Wales
- School: Caerphilly Secondary School
- Occupation(s): Police officer School teacher

Rugby union career
- Position: Lock
Amateur team(s)
| Years | Team | Apps | (Points) |
- Bedwas RFC
| – | Cardiff RFC | | |
| – | Royal Air Force | | |
| – | Glamorgan Police | | |
International career
| Years | Team | Apps | (Points) |
| 1935-39 | Wales | 8 | (0) |
- Rugby league career

Playing information
- Position: Forward
Club
| Years | Team | Pld | T | G | FG | P |
|---|---|---|---|---|---|---|
| 1939 | Wigan |
Representative
| Years | Team | Pld | T | G | FG | P |
| 1941–45 | Wales | 3 | | | | 0 |

Eddie Watkins (2 March 1916 – 28 June 1995) was a Welsh dual-code international rugby player who played club rugby under the union code for Cardiff, and later professional league rugby with Wigan. As a union player Watkins was part of the 1939 team which won the Home Nations Championship, and was more famously a member of the Welsh side that beat the touring All Blacks in 1935. In 1939 he joined Wigan and played in three internationals during the war years for Wales league side against England.

During the Second World War he served in the Special Investigation Branch of the Royal Air Force, and played in two Services internationals.

== Rugby union career ==
Watkins began his club rugby days with Bedwas before moving to first class side Cardiff. In 1935, Watkins was chosen by Cardiff to face the touring New Zealand team. Cardiff were hoping that a strong pack containing Watkins, Les Spence and Gwyn Williams would give the club an advantage against the All Blacks, but were soundly beaten in an exciting game.

Watkins gained his was first cap for Wales in 1935 again against New Zealand. In a memorable game, Wales turned around a losing score-line in the last ten minutes to beat the All Blacks 13–12. Watkins was not selected for Wales throughout 1936, but was back for the final two games of the 1937 Home Nations Championship. It was a poor campaign for Wales and Watkins, with Wales losing all matches during the 1937 campaign. Watkins was reselected for the 1938 Championship, playing all three games. The opening game was against England at the Cardiff Arms Park, and under the captaincy of Cardiff team-mate Cliff Jones, Watkins was involved in his first Home Nations victory. In 1939 Watkins took part in his last Home Nations campaign, and although missing the game against Ireland, he was still a member of a Wales Championship winning team as Wilf Wooller's team lifted the trophy with wins over Ireland and Scotland.

=== International games played ===
Wales, rugby union

- England 1938, 1939
- Ireland 1937, 1938
- New Zealand 1935
- Scotland 1937, 1938, 1939

== Rugby league career ==
In March 1939 Watkins joined professional rugby league team Wigan for a reported fee of £600, making his first appearance for the club on 18 March. During his time with Wigan, he made three appearances for the Wales national rugby league side, his first was played at Odsal against England on 18 October 1941.

=== Championship final appearances ===
Eddie Watkins played at second-row in Wigan's 12–5 victory over Dewsbury in the Championship Final second-leg during the 1943–44 season at Crown Flatt, Dewsbury on Saturday 20 May 1944 (Jack Cayzer having played at second-row in the first-leg), and played at second-row in the 13–4 victory over Huddersfield in the Championship Final during the 1945–46 season at Maine Road, Manchester on Saturday 18 May 1946.

=== International games played ===
Wales, rugby league

- England 1941, 1943, 1945

== Bibliography ==
- Billot, John (1972). All Blacks in Wales. Ferndale: Ron Jones Publications.
- Godwin, Terry (1984). The International Rugby Championship 1883-1983. London: Willows Books. ISBN 0-00-218060-X.
- Smith, David; Williams, Gareth (1980). Fields of Praise: The Official History of The Welsh Rugby Union. Cardiff: University of Wales Press. ISBN 0-7083-0766-3.
