= Glyn Morgan (rugby) =

Wales international rugby league footballer

Personal information
- Full name: W. Glyn Morgan
- Born: unknown Penygraig, Wales

Playing information

Rugby union
- Position: Scrum-half
Club
Years	Team	Pld	T	G	FG	P
1936–39	Cardiff RFC	108

Rugby league
- Position: Scrum-half
Club
Years	Team	Pld	T	G	FG	P
≤1946–≥47	Huddersfield
1949–50	Oldham RLFC	12	0	0	0	0
≥1951–≤52	Cardiff RLFC
	Total	12	0	0	0	0
Representative
Years	Team	Pld	T	G	FG	P
1951	Wales	1

W. Glyn Morgan (birth unknown) was a Welsh former rugby union and professional rugby league footballer who played in the 1930s, 1940s and 1950s. He played club level rugby union (RU) for Cardiff RFC, as a scrum-half, and representative level rugby league (RL) for Wales, and at club level for Huddersfield, Oldham RLFC and Cardiff RLFC, as a scrum-half.

== Background ==
Glyn Morgan was born in Penygraig, Wales.

== Playing career ==
=== International honours ===
Glyn Morgan won 4 caps for Wales (RL) in 1947–1949 while at Huddersfield and Cardiff RLFC.

=== Championship final appearances ===
Glyn Morgan played scrum-half in Huddersfield's 4–13 defeat by Wigan in the Championship Final during the 1945–46 season at Maine Road, Manchester on Saturday 18 May 1946.
