= Geoff Clark (rugby league) =

England international rugby league footballer

Personal information
- Full name: Geoffrey Y. Clark
- Born: c. 1920 Wigton district, England
- Died: 13 November 2008 (aged 88) Drighlington, England

Playing information
- Position: Wing, Centre
Club
Years	Team	Pld	T	G	FG	P
1945–51	Dewsbury
Representative
Years	Team	Pld	T	G	FG	P
1946–50	Cumberland	7	5	0	0	15
1949–51	England	2	1	0	0	3

Geoff Clark (c. 1920 – 13 November 2008) was an English professional rugby league footballer who played in the 1940s and 1950s. He played at representative level for England and Cumberland, and at club level for Dewsbury, as a wing or centre.

== Background ==
Geoff Clark's birth was registered in Wigton district, Cumberland, England, he worked at Yorkshire Electric Transformer Company, Brewery Lane, Thornhill Lees, for three years he was the Steward at Howley Hall Golf Club, Scotchman Lane, Morley, Leeds, he was the last surviving member of Dewsbury's 1947 Championship final team and Dewsbury's oldest ex-player, after a lengthy illness, he died aged 88 in Drighlington, West Yorkshire, his funeral took place at Dewsbury Moor Crematarium at 1pm on 20 November 2008.

== Playing career ==
Clark played at centre in Dewsbury's 4–13 defeat by Wigan in the Championship Final during the 1946–47 season at Maine Road, Manchester on Saturday 21 June 1947. Clark won caps for England while at Dewsbury in 1949 against Other Nationalities, and in 1951 against Other Nationalities.
