= James Higgins (Australian cricketer) =

Australian cricketer

Personal information
- Born: 14 November 1874; Ormiston, Queensland, Australia
- Died: 24 November 1957 (aged 83); Sandgate, Queensland, Australia
- Source: Cricinfo, 3 October 2020

James Higgins (14 November 1874 – 24 November 1957) was an Australian cricketer. He played in one first-class match for Queensland in 1898/99.

== See also ==
- List of Queensland first-class cricketers
