= James Higgins (English cricketer) =

English cricketer

James Higgins (13 March 1877 – 19 July 1954) was an English first-class cricketer, who played nine matches for Yorkshire County Cricket Club from 1901 to 1905. He also appeared for the Yorkshire Second XI (1901–1905), Yorkshire Colts (1900–1902) and Yorkshire Cricket Council (1903).

Higgins was born in Birstall, Batley, Yorkshire, England, and was a right-handed batsman and wicket-keeper, who scored 93 runs at 10.33, with a best of 28* against Gloucestershire. He took ten catches and completed three stumpings.

He died in July 1954 in Wibsey, Bradford, Yorkshire.
