= Francis A. Teall =

Francis Augustus Teall (16 August 1822 in Fort Ann, New York – 16 November 1894) was an American editor.

He entered a printing office in 1836, afterward supplemented his common school education by the study of languages, and in 1841 went to New York City. Here he worked at the case, with Walt Whitman as a fellow compositor. He soon advanced to the place of proofreader. In this capacity, he rendered much critical service of an editorial character on a large variety of works. Among other interesting things that received his attention were the original proofs of Edgar Allan Poe's “Raven” and “Bells.” He assisted Ephraim G. Squier in preparing his Ancient Monuments of the Mississippi Valley (Washington, 1848), and John R. Bartlett in the first edition of his Dictionary of Americanisms, and made the analytical index to the American edition of Napier's Peninsular War.

For some time, he was on the editorial staff of the American Whig Review, and in 1853 succeeded Whitman as editor of a newspaper at Huntington, Long Island. He acted as proofreader, contributor, and associate editor on the different editions of the American Cyclopaedia, and noted the pronunciation of the titles in the volume of index to the second edition and in the text of the condensed edition. Beginning 1882, he was employed in the compilation of the Century Dictionary. The University of Rochester gave him the degree of A.M. in 1875.
