= Wheldale Colliery =

Former coal mine in Castleford, West Yorkshire, England

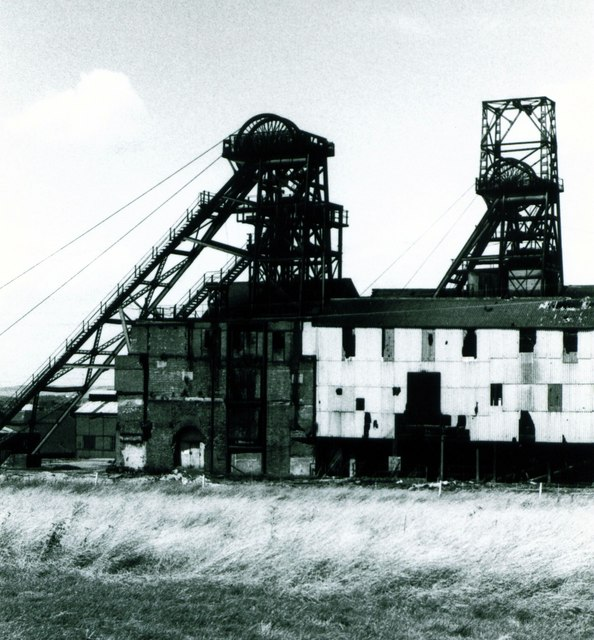
- Wheldale colliery after closure (1988)

- Location within West Yorkshire
- Location: Castleford, West Yorkshire, England; 53.7311°N 1.3325°W
- Products: Coal
- Production: 409,000 tonnes (451,000 tons)
- Financial year: 1949
- Opened: 1868
- Closed: 1987

Wheldale Colliery was a coal mine located in Castleford, Yorkshire, England which produced coal for 117 years. It was accessed from Wheldon Road.

After closure, the site was used to gather coal-bed methane for conversion into electricity.

== History ==
The colliery was founded in 1868 when two shafts, both 13 feet (4 m) in diameter, were sunk to the Beeston coal seam at a depth of 564 yards (516 m). Production started in 1870. One of the main investors was a Dr Holt, and so for many years the colliery was known as the "doctor's pit".

In 1891 a fire in the colliery caused the death of five miners.

In 1899, on the 22 June one boy, Hodgson, aged 16 died, and another, Gregg, aged 15, was injured in an incident. The Wheldale coal company and Fryston coal company amalgamated. In 1919 Wheldale coal company amalgamated with Allerton Bywater colliery to form Airedale Collieries LTD.

About 1000 men and boys worked in the mine, producing about 200,000 tonnes (220,000 tons) of coal each year. This was reduced in 1902 and 1903 because there was a long miner's strike.

On 22 February 1923, nine men were killed in an underground explosion. One was killed outright; the further eight dying from severe burns later.

Because Wheldale had no coal washing plant, in the 1930s a mineral line was laid from Wheldale to Fryston, and coal that required washing was sent to Fryston colliery.

In 1947 the Wheldale colliery was nationalised, and in 1949 major improvements were made: The colliery was completely electrified. Two skips were installed in the downcast shaft, each with a capacity of six tonnes, allowing production of 350 tonnes per hour. The Downcast shaft had an electric winder which had two 475 horsepower (354 kW) motors. The upcast shaft, which was for men and materials, had two single deck cages, each of which could hold two tubs. The winder had a 180 horsepower (130 kW) motor. Conveyor belts were installed; Wheldale then had the longest single conveyor belt in the world, about one mile in length. Gate roads were 30-inch belts, trunk conveyors were 36 inches in width. The Flockton seam had two bunkers, a pit bottom bunker of 250 tonnes capacity and an inbye bunker of 200 tonnes. Dirt from repairs in the return gates was transported to the pit bottom in tubs. Diesel locomotives carried men and material about the mine.

By this time the shafts at Wheldale had six insets: Warren House seam at 600 feet (183 m), Haigh Moor seam at 846 feet (258 m), Flockton Thick seam at 1,135 feet (346 m), Middleton Little seam at 1,300 feet (400 m), Silkstone seam at 1,430 feet (436 m) m and Beeston seam at 1,693 feet (516 m).

Coal was mined using AFC mounted trepanners. There was no coal preparation plant at the colliery, so while coal smaller than one inch could be sent directly to Glasshoughton Coking plant or by barge to Ferrybridge power station, coal larger than one inch was sent by locomotive to Fryston colliery for treatment. At this time Wheldale's six hundred miners produced on average 400,000 tonnes (440,000 tons) of coal per year. In 1949, this was registered as being 409,000 tonnes (451,000 tons).

In 1950 there was another miners' strike at the colliery.

In 1972 Wheldale was the last colliery in Yorkshire to use pit ponies. Fryston colliery closed in 1985, and a barrel washer was set up to clean coal at Wheldale.

In 1982 Wheldale produced a record-breaking output of 500,000 tonnes (550,000 tons). That year it was the last colliery in the UK to use a steam locomotive on its sidings. In 1985 there was once more a strike of the coal miners.

Wheldale colliery closed in October 1987. Equipment was salvaged, and then the site was then cleared, but the shafts were not filled.

== Coal-bed methane plant ==
A methane capture plant was built to convert the methane gas from the old workings into electricity. This power station generates 10MW of power and provides electricity for about 8,000 homes.

At the time of closure, each shaft had a concrete landing between the Flockton and Middleton little seam insets. These landings needed to be removed because they were exuding low atmospheric pressure explosive quantities of methane gas, which was escaping from the old lower workings. The landings were removed with a Jetknife 2000 high-pressure water system with abrasive particles in the water. This was carried out using a robot-controlled machine while supervised by the engineers in the colliery offices via CCTV.

The site was eventually restored to its original woodland, grassland and wetland state, with bridle and footpaths for recreational use.
