= Jeff Bawden =

English rugby league footballer and coach

Personal information
- Full name: Jeffrey Bawden
- Born: 13 January 1924; Whitehaven, England
- Died: 5 March 2006 (aged 82); Whitehaven, England

Playing information
- Position: Wing, Centre
Club
Years	Team	Pld	T	G	FG	P
1943–52	Huddersfield	243	91	515		1303
Representative
Years	Team	Pld	T	G	FG	P
	Cumberland	14	2	23		52

Coaching information
Club
Years	Team	Gms	W	D	L	W%
1971	Whitehaven

Jeffrey Bawden (13 January 1924 – 5 March 2006) was an English rugby league footballer who played in the 1940s and 1950s, and coached in the 1950s. He played at representative level for Cumberland, and at club level for Hensingham ARLFC and Huddersfield, as a wing, or centre, and coached at club level for Whitehaven.

== Background ==
Jeff Bawden was born in Whitehaven, Cumberland, England, and he died in Whitehaven, Cumbria, England.

== Playing career ==
As a teenager, Bawden also played rugby union, and represented England rugby union schoolboys at the age of 13. He was also a talented footballer, and turned down an offer to trial with Wolverhampton Wanderers shortly before joining Huddersfield.

Bawden spent his entire professional career with Huddersfield, appearing 243 times for the club between 1943 and 1952. He also represented Cumberland on 14 occasions. Jeff Bawden played at centre and scored a conversion in Cumberland's 5-4 victory over Australia in the 1948–49 Kangaroo tour of Great Britain and France match at the Recreation Ground, Whitehaven on Wednesday 13 October 1948, in front of a crowd of 8,818. Bawden played at centre, and scored three conversions in Huddersfield's 4-11 defeat by Bradford Northern in the 1949–50 Yorkshire Cup Final during the 1949–50 season at Headingley, Leeds on Saturday 29 October 1949. He was granted a testimonial by Huddersfield in 1953.

After retiring from playing, he returned to his hometown, and held various non-playing roles at Whitehaven, including a spell as head coach.

In 1999, Bawden was inducted into Huddersfield's Hall of Fame.
