= 1946–47 Yorkshire Cup =

- Structure: Regional knockout championship
- Teams: 16
- Winners: Wakefield Trinity
- Runners-up: Hull

1946–47 was the thirty-ninth occasion on which the Yorkshire Cup competition had been held.

Wakefield Trinity won the trophy by beating Hull F.C. by the score of 10–0

The match was played at Headingley, Leeds, now in West Yorkshire. The attendance was 34,300 and receipts were £3,718

This is Wakefield Trinity second successive appearance in a Yorkshire Cup final, last year they were beaten by Bradford Northern 5–2

== Background ==
This season junior/amateur clubs Yorkshire Amateurs were invited to take part. This increased the number of clubs who entered last season by one to a total number of sixteen.

This in turn resulted in no byes in the first round.

The competition again followed the original formula of a knock-out tournament, with the exception of the first round which was still played on a two-legged home and away basis.

== Competition and results ==
=== Round 1 – first leg ===
Involved 8 matches (with no byes) and 16 clubs

All first round ties are played on a two-legged home and away basis

Game No	Fixture date	Home team	Score	Away team	Venue	agg	Att	Rec	Notes	Ref
1	Wed 11 Sep 1946	Yorkshire Amateurs	7–28	York	Parkside				(Note: Yorkshire Amateurs were a team from Yorkshire which appeared to have players selected from many, both professional and amateur, clubs. Yorkshire Amateurs played on many grounds, this year their home match was played at Parkside, the ground of Hunslet)	
2	Sat 14 Sep 1946	Batley	8–9	Hunslet	Mount Pleasant					
3	Sat 14 Sep 1946	Bramley	4–9	Dewsbury	Barley Mow					
4	Sat 14 Sep 1946	Featherstone Rovers	10–16	Hull	Post Office Road					
5	Sat 14 Sep 1946	Huddersfield	20–5	Bradford Northern	Fartown					
6	Sat 14 Sep 1946	Hull Kingston Rovers	10–9	Halifax	Craven Park (1)					
7	Sat 14 Sep 1946	Keighley	14–11	Wakefield Trinity	Lawkholme Lane					
8	Sat 14 Sep 1946	Leeds	8–11	Castleford	Headingley					

=== Round 1 – second leg ===
Involved 8 matches (with no byes) and 16 clubs

All first round ties are played on a two-legged home and away basis

Game No	Fixture date	Home team	Score	Away team	Venue	agg	Att	Rec	Notes	Ref
1	Sat 14 Sep 1946	York	29–12	Yorkshire Amateurs	Clarence Street	57–19				
2	Sat 21 Sep 1946	Hunslet	10–4	Batley	Parkside	19–12				
3	Sat 21 Sep 1946	Dewsbury	9–8	Bramley	Crown Flatt	18–12				
4	Sat 21 Sep 1946	Hull	24–3	Featherstone Rovers	Boulevard	42–13				
5	Sat 21 Sep 1946	Bradford Northern	3–20	Huddersfield	Odsal	8–40				
6	Sat 21 Sep 1946	Halifax	7–11	Hull Kingston Rovers	Thrum Hall	16–21				
7	Sat 21 Sep 1946	Wakefield Trinity	8–2	Keighley	Belle Vue	19–16				
8	Sat 21 Sep 1946	Castleford	16–7	Leeds	Wheldon Road	27–15				

=== Round 2 - quarterfinals ===
Involved 4 matches and 8 clubs

All second round ties are played on a knock-out basis

Game No	Fixture date	Home team	Score	Away team	Venue	agg	Att	Rec	Notes	Ref
1	Wed 25 Sep 1946	Hunslet	10–9	Dewsbury	Parkside					
2	Mon 30 Sep 1946	Huddersfield	10–15	Hull Kingston Rovers	Fartown					
3	Thu 3 Oct 1946	Hull	42–8	York	Boulevard					
4	Thu 3 Oct 1946	Wakefield Trinity	11–2	Castleford	Belle Vue					

=== Round 3 – semifinals ===
Involved 2 matches and 4 clubs

Both semi-final ties are played on a knock-out basis

Game No	Fixture date	Home team	Score	Away team	Venue	agg	Att	Rec	Notes	Ref
1	Thu 10 Oct 1946	Hull	15–11	Hull Kingston Rovers	Boulevard					
2	Wed 16 Oct 1946	Wakefield Trinity	7–4	Hunslet	Belle Vue					

=== Final ===
Game No	Fixture date	Home team	Score	Away team	Venue	agg	Att	Rec	Notes	Ref
	Saturday 2 November 1946	Wakefield Trinity	10–0	Hull	Headingley		34,300	£3,718	(Note: The attendance is given as 34,300 by the Rothmans Rugby League Yearbook of 1991-92 and 1990-91 but 29,000 by RUGBYLEAGUEproject and also by "100 Years of Rugby. The History of Wakefield Trinity 1873-1973" The attendance of 34,300, if correct, is a record to date beating the previous record of 33,719 set in 1922. The previous second highest attendance was 28,714 set in 1938) (Note: The receipts of £3,718 were a new record, beating the previous best of £2,414 set in 1922 by over £1,300) (Note: Headingley, Leeds, is the home ground of Leeds RLFC with a capacity of 21,000. The record attendance was 40,175 for a league match between Leeds and Bradford Northern on 21 May 1947.)	

==== Teams and scorers ====
Wakefield Trinity	№	Hull
	teams	
Billy Teall	1	Freddie Miller (c)
Jackie Perry	2	Tommy Glynn
Johnny Jones	3	Ivor Watts
Jim Croston	4	Alan Sinclair
Dennis Baddeley	5	Albert Bowers
Ron Rylance (c)	6	Ernie Lawrence
Arthur Fletcher	7	Tom Johnson
Harry Wilkinson	8	Fred Shillito
Len Marson	9	Harry Wilkinson
Jim Higgins	10	Stan Jimmison
Mick Exley	11	Charlie Booth
Harry Murphy	12	Jack Tindall
Len Bratley	13	Alf Shakesby
probably James "Jim" Croston	Coach	Ted Tattersfield (trainer)
10	score	0
0	HT	0
	Scorers	
	Tries	
Ron Rylance (1)	T	no score
Arthur Fletcher (1)	T	
	Goals	
Jackie Perry (2)	G	
Referee		George Phillips (Widnes)

Scoring - Try = three (3) points - Goal = two (2) points - Drop goal = two (2) points

=== The road to success ===
All the ties in the first round were played on a two leg (home and away) basis.

For the first round ties, the first club named in each of the ties played the first leg at home.

For the first round ties, the scores shown are the aggregate score over the two legs.

First round
Hull Kingston Rovers	9
Dewsbury	24
Bramley	29
Keighley	39
Bradford Northern
bye
Batley	5
Hunslet	40
Wakefield Trinity	52
Huddersfield	12
Halifax	23
Hull	35
Leeds	21
Castleford	15
York	L
Featherstone Rovers	W

Second round
Dewsbury	10
Keighley	3
Bradford Northern	8
Hunslet	0
Wakefield Trinity	34
Hull	7
Leeds	11
Featherstone Rovers	4

Semifinals
Dewsbury	2
Bradford Northern	7
Wakefield Trinity	14
Leeds	7

Final
Bradford Northern	5
Wakefield Trinity	2

== See also ==
- 1946–47 Northern Rugby Football League season
- Rugby league county cups
