= 1945–46 Northern Rugby Football League season =

1945–46 Rugby Football League season
- League: Northern Rugby Football League
- Teams: 27
- Champions: Wigan
- League Leaders: Wigan
- Top point-scorer: Jeff Bawden 239
- Top try-scorer: Eric Batten 35

The 1945–46 Rugby Football League season was the 51st season of rugby league football.

== Season summary ==
Wigan won their fifth Championship when they defeated Huddersfield 13-4 in the play-off final. They had also finished the regular season as the league leaders.

The Challenge Cup Winners were Wakefield Trinity who defeated Wigan 13-12 in the final.

Bramley, Broughton Rangers, Hull Kingston Rovers, Liverpool Stanley, Rochdale Hornets, Salford, Swinton, Warrington and Widnes returned following the Second World War. Workington Town also entered a team for the first time.

Jim Sullivan of Wigan ended his career this season as the all-time record scorer of goals with 2,867.

Wigan won the Lancashire League, and Wakefield Trinity won the Yorkshire League.

== Championship ==
	Team	Pld	W	D	L	Pts
1	Wigan	36	29	2	5	58
2	Huddersfield	36	27	1	8	55
3	Wakefield Trinity	36	26	0	10	52
4	Bradford Northern	36	24	3	9	51
5	Barrow	36	22	4	10	48
6	Dewsbury	36	23	0	13	46
7	Hunslet	36	21	4	11	46
8	Salford	36	23	0	13	46
9	Batley	36	21	4	11	46
10	Warrington	36	21	3	12	45
11	Castleford	36	22	0	14	44
12	Widnes	36	19	3	14	41
13	Featherstone Rovers	36	19	1	16	39
14	Halifax	36	19	0	17	38
15	Oldham	36	18	0	18	36
16	Broughton Rangers	36	16	3	17	35
17	Hull	36	16	2	18	34
18	Hull Kingston Rovers	36	15	3	18	33
19	Workington Town	36	15	0	21	30
20	St. Helens	36	13	1	22	27
21	Swinton	36	9	5	22	23
22	Keighley	36	9	2	25	20
23	Leeds	36	9	1	26	19
24	Rochdale Hornets	36	9	1	26	19
25	Bramley	36	9	0	27	18
26	Liverpool Stanley	36	5	2	29	12
27	York	36	4	1	31	9

=== Play-offs ===
Semi-finals
1	Wigan	18
4	Bradford Northern	4
2	Huddersfield	8
3	Wakefield Trinity	3

Championship final
Wigan	13
Huddersfield	4

==== Final ====
The Championship Play-off Final was played at Manchester City Football Club on Saturday 18 May.

18 May 1946

Wigan	13 – 4	Huddersfield
Tries: Ashcroft (2), Cunliffe; Goals: Nordgren (2)		Goals: Bawden (2)

Maine Road, Manchester
Attendance: 67,136
Referee: A. S. Dobson (Featherstone)

Wigan	Number	Huddersfield
	Teams	
Jack Cunliffe	1	William Leake
Brian Nordgren	2	John Anderson
Gordon Ratcliffe	3	Alex Fiddes
Ernie Ashcroft	4	Bill Davies
Stan Jolley	5	Jeff Bawden
Reg Lowrey	6	Tom Grahame
Tommy Bradshaw	7	Glyn Morgan
George Banks	8	Ken Mallinson
Jack Blan	9	Harold Whitehead
Frank Barton	10	Joe Bradbury
Eddie Watkins	11	John Aspinall
Harry Atkinson	12	Leslie Baxter
Billy Blan	13	Robert Robson
Jim Sullivan	Coach	

== Challenge Cup ==
The final returned to Wembley following the end of the Second World War. Wakefield Trinity beat Wigan 13-12 in front of a crowd of 54,730. This was Wakefield Trinity’s second Challenge Cup Final win in three final appearances. Their centre, Billy Stott was awarded the inaugural Lance Todd Trophy for man-of-the-match.

== County cups ==
Widnes beat Wigan 7–3 to win the Lancashire Cup, and Bradford Northern beat Wakefield Trinity 5–2 to win the Yorkshire Cup.

== European Championship ==
The tri-nation tournament was played between November 1945 and March 1946 as single round robin games between England, France and Wales. This was the fifth Rugby League European Championship, and was won by England on points average.
Match Details

Date	Venue	Home team	Score	Away team
24 November 1945	Swansea	Wales	11 - 3	England
23 February 1946	Swinton	England	16 - 6	France
24 March 1946	Bordeaux	France	19 - 7	Wales

== Sources ==
- Saxton, Irvin (ed.). History of Rugby League: No.51 1945–1946. League Publications.
- 1945–46 Rugby Football League season at wigan.rlfans.com
- The Challenge Cup at The Rugby Football League website
