= 1946–47 Northern Rugby Football League season =

1946–47 Rugby Football League season
- League: Northern Rugby Football League
- Teams: 28
- Champions: Wigan
- League Leaders: Wigan
- Top point-scorer: Jeff Bawden 243
- Top try-scorer: Brian Bevan 48

The 1946–47 Rugby Football League season was the 52nd season of rugby league football.

== Season summary ==
1946-47 ended up being the longest season on record after a poor winter saw many matches postponed. Just as the country was recovering from post-World War II fuel and food shortages, it had to cope with prolonged frost and snow from 21 January to 16 March.

Wigan won their sixth Championship when they beat Dewsbury 13-4 in the play-off final at Maine Road, Manchester in front of a crowd of 40,599. Wigan scored three tries and two goals to Dewsbury's two goals. Wigan had also ended the regular season as league leaders.

The Challenge Cup winners were Bradford Northern who were 8-4 winners over Leeds.

Leigh returned following World War II. Broughton Rangers relocated, and were renamed Belle Vue Rangers.

Wigan won the Lancashire League, and Dewsbury won the Yorkshire League. Wigan beat Belle Vue Rangers 9–3 to win the Lancashire County Cup, and Wakefield Trinity beat Hull F.C. 10–0 to win the Yorkshire County Cup.

== Championship ==
	Team	Pld	W	D	L	Pts
1	Wigan	36	29	1	6	59
2	Dewsbury	36	27	1	8	55
3	Widnes	36	26	2	8	54
4	Leeds	36	25	2	9	52
5	Warrington	36	26	0	10	52
6	Bradford Northern	36	24	3	9	51
7	Huddersfield	36	24	2	10	50
8	Oldham	36	22	2	12	46
9	Leigh	36	21	0	15	42
10	Wakefield Trinity	36	20	2	14	42
11	Workington Town	36	19	2	15	40
12	Barrow	36	18	4	14	40
13	Castleford	36	19	1	16	39
14	Hunslet	36	17	2	17	36
15	Hull	36	17	0	19	34
16	Hull Kingston Rovers	36	15	3	18	33
17	Batley	36	15	1	20	31
18	Belle Vue Rangers	36	14	3	19	31
19	St. Helens	36	14	1	21	29
20	Halifax	36	13	2	21	28
21	York	36	12	2	22	26
22	Salford	36	11	2	23	24
23	Liverpool Stanley	36	11	1	24	23
24	Swinton	36	11	1	24	23
25	Keighley	36	10	1	25	21
26	Featherstone Rovers	36	9	1	26	19
27	Rochdale Hornets	36	9	0	27	18
28	Bramley	36	5	0	31	10

== Play-offs ==
Semi-finals
1	Wigan	21
4	Leeds	11
2	Dewsbury	5
3	Widnes	2

Championship final
Wigan	13
Dewsbury	4

21 June 1947

Wigan	13 – 4	Dewsbury
Tries: Nordgren, Lawrenson, Bradshaw; Goals: Ward (2)		Goals: Ledgard, Holt

Maine Road, Manchester
Attendance: 40,599
Referee: A. S. Dobson (Pontefract)

Wigan	Number	Dewsbury
	Teams	
Jack Cunliffe	1	Jimmy Ledgard
Brian Nordgren	2	Des Armitage
Ted Ward	3	Geoff Clark
Ernie Ashcroft	4	Ken Sacker
Johnny Lawrenson	5	George Withington
Cecil Mountford	6	Cyril Gilbertson
Tommy Bradshaw	7	Harry Royal
Ken Gee	8	Harry Hammond
Joe Egan	9	Vince McKeating
Frank Barton	10	Ben Pearson
George Banks	11	Frank Cox
Billy Blan	12	Jack Holt
Jack Blan	13	Arthur Street
Jim Sullivan	Coach	Vic Hey

== Challenge Cup ==
Leeds reached the Wembley final for the second time, doing so without conceding a single point in the final five rounds of the tournament. However Bradford Northern beat Leeds 8-4 in the final in front of a crowd of 77,605. Trevor Foster and Emlyn Walters scored Bradford's tries and were converted by Ernest Ward. Willie Davies, Bradford Northern's stand-off half back, won the Lance Todd Trophy for man of the match.

This was Bradford’s third Cup Final win in five Final appearances including one win and one loss during World War II.

== Sources ==
- Saxton, Irvin (ed.). History of Rugby League: No.52 1946–1947. League Publications.
- 1946-47 Rugby Football League season at wigan.rlfans.com
- The Challenge Cup at The Rugby Football League website
