= 1947–48 Northern Rugby Football League season =

1947–48 Rugby Football League season
- League: Northern Rugby Football League
- Champions: Warrington
- League Leaders: Wigan
- Top point-scorer(s): Jeff Bawden 243
- Top try-scorer(s): Brian Bevan 57

The 1947–48 Rugby Football League season was the 53rd season of rugby league football.

== Season summary ==
Warrington won their first Championship when they beat Bradford Northern 15–5 in the play-off final. Wigan had ended the regular season as the league leaders.

The Challenge Cup Winners were Wigan who beat Bradford Northern 8–3 in the final.

Wigan's 1948 Challenge Cup Final victory over Bradford Northern was the first ever televised Rugby League match and Cup Final – although it was shown in the Midlands only.

Warrington won the Lancashire League, and Bradford Northern won the Yorkshire League. Wigan beat Belle Vue Rangers 10–7 to win the Lancashire County Cup, and Wakefield Trinity beat Leeds 7–7 (replay 8–7) to win the Yorkshire County Cup.

== Championship ==
	Team	Pld	W	D	L	Pts
1	Wigan	36	31	1	4	63
2	Warrington	36	30	1	5	61
3	Huddersfield	36	26	2	8	54
4	Bradford Northern	36	26	2	10	52
5	Workington Town	36	22	4	10	48
6	Hunslet	36	21	4	11	46
7	Widnes	36	21	1	14	43
8	St. Helens	36	20	2	14	42
9	Leeds	36	20	2	14	42
10	Wakefield Trinity	36	20	2	14	42
11	Salford	36	20	1	15	41
12	Hull	36	19	1	16	39
13	Castleford	36	19	1	16	39
14	Leigh	36	18	1	17	37
15	Dewsbury	36	17	2	17	36
16	Oldham	36	17	1	18	35
17	Belle Vue Rangers	36	17	0	19	34
18	Halifax	36	16	0	20	32
19	Swinton	36	15	1	20	31
20	Keighley	36	15	1	20	31
21	Barrow	36	14	2	20	30
22	Rochdale Hornets	36	11	2	23	24
23	Bramley	36	12	0	24	24
24	Batley	36	11	1	24	23
25	Hull Kingston Rovers	36	10	1	25	21
26	Liverpool Stanley	36	8	1	27	17
27	Featherstone Rovers	36	6	0	30	12
28	York	36	4	1	31	9

=== Play-offs ===
Semi-finals
1	Wigan	3
4	Bradford Northern	15
2	Warrington	17
3	Huddersfield	5

Championship final
Warrington	15
Bradford Northern	5

==== Final ====
8 May 1948

Warrington	15 – 5	Bradford Northern
Tries: Bevan, Pimblett, Powell; Goals: Palin (3)		Tries: Case; Goals: E. Ward

Maine Road, Manchester
Attendance: 69,143
Referee: A. S. Dobson (Featherstone)

Warrington	Number	Bradford Northern
	Teams	
Les Jones	1	George Carmichael
Brian Bevan	2	Eric Batten
Bryn Knowelden	3	Des Case
Albert Pimblett	4	Ernest Ward
Stan Powell	5	Alan Edwards
Jack Fleming	6	Willie Davies
Gerry Helme	7	Donald Ward
Bill Derbyshire	8	Frank Whitcombe
Dave Cotton	9	Vic Darlison
Bill Riley	10	H. Smith
Jim Featherstone	11	Trevor Foster
Bob Ryan	12	Barry Tyler
Harold Palin	13	Ken Traill
Chris Brockbank	Coach	Dai Rees

== Challenge Cup ==
Wigan beat Bradford 8–3 in the final played at Wembley in front of a crowd of 91,465. This was the first Rugby League match ever attended by the reigning monarch, HM King George VI, who presented the trophy. This was also the first televised rugby league match.

This was Wigan's third Cup Final win in seven Final appearances including one loss during World War II. Frank Whitcombe, Bradford Northern's prop forward was awarded the Lance Todd Trophy for man-of-the-match.

== Sources ==
- 1947-48 Rugby Football League season at wigan.rlfans.com
- The Challenge Cup at The Rugby Football League website
