= Thrum Hall =

Former rugby league stadium in Halifax, England

- Interactive map of Thrum Hall
- Location: Halifax, West Yorkshire
- Coordinates: 53°43′29.55″N 1°53′17.60″W
- Capacity: 9,832 (before closure)
- Record attendance: 29,153 (21 March 1959 v Wigan)

Construction
- Opened: 18 September 1886
- Closed: 1998

Tenant
- Halifax

Thrum Hall was a rugby league stadium on Hanson Lane in Halifax, West Yorkshire, England. It was the home of Halifax for 112 years. The site on which the ground stood is now occupied by a supermarket.

== History ==
In 1878, Halifax, who had just won the inaugural Yorkshire Cup, bought a patch of land for £3,000 from a local farmer, Major Dyson, to develop as a new multi-purpose sports ground. It was to be a replacement for their Hanson Lane ground which stood opposite.

The site measured 55,000 square yards and included a cricket pitch and bowling greens. The rugby stadium was opened on 18 September 1886 by Alderman Riley, who kicked off before the Halifax v Hull F.C. match. Forward Ernest Williamson scored the first try (his only try for Halifax) and the home side went on to win in front of a crowd of around 8,000. As Thrum Hall was built on an old hilltop farm, it had a distinctive slope of 4 yards away from the main grandstand touchline.

The ground was continuously developed over the next 40 to 50 years and it came to be regularly used as a neutral ground for Challenge Cup and Championship matches, including the 1914 Challenge Cup final (won by Hull) and the 1912, 1929 and 1930 Championship deciders.

Thrum Hall was run by trustees from 1921.

The attendance record of 29,153 was set in a third round Challenge Cup tie against Wigan on 21 March 1959. By the time of the Taylor Report, Thrum Hall's capacity was reduced to 9,832.

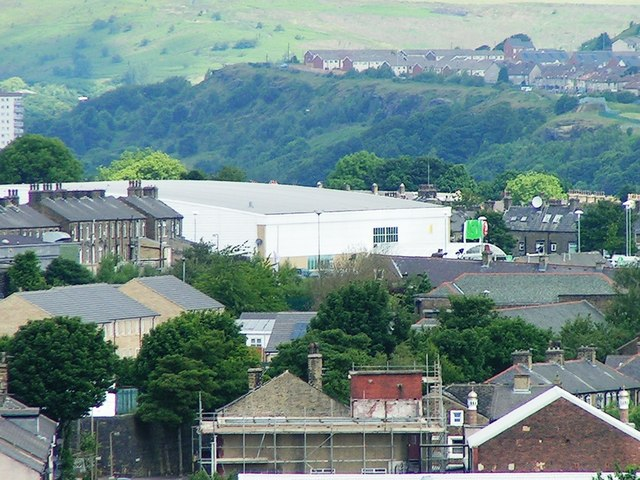
The Asda supermarket that now stands on the site of Thrum Hall stadium

Halifax was hit hard by the financial situation of the late 1960s, and 1970s. In 1970, a concert was held at Thrum Hall in an attempt to alleviate these financial troubles. Adverse weather conditions meant that only around 3,000 arrived to watch the 'Halifax Pop and Blues Concert' which made a loss of £6,000.

== Other uses ==
The adjacent Thrum Hall Cricket Ground hosted four first class cricket matches between 1888 and 1897. Yorkshire played three County Championship matches there, in July 1888 against Gloucestershire, August 1889 against Middlesex and Kent in June 1897, while they played Essex in a non-championship fixture in July 1894. Kent were bowled out for 74 in their match, with Bobby Peel taking 8 for 93. Peel also bowled Gloucestershire out for just 89, taking 7 for 39, in a low scoring match which Yorkshire won by 3 wickets.

The cricket ground had a speedway track constructed around the outside of it in 1928 and it was known as the Thrum Hall Grounds by this time. It hosted speedway until 1930 when the new Halifax Greyhound Stadium was constructed on the site.

== Closure ==
Halifax sold Thrum Hall for £1.5 million to Asda for a superstore development in 1998, and moved across town to their present home, the Shay Stadium. The supermarket chain closed their existing store in Battinson Road, when the new store finally opened after a protracted legal battle in 2004.

The final match to be played at the ground was on 22 March 1998 where Halifax defeated Leeds 35–28.

== Rugby League Test Matches ==
The list of international rugby league matches played at Thrum Hall is:

Game#	Date	Result	Attendance	Notes
1	7 April 1930	Other Nationalities def. England 35–19	2,300	
2	10 April 1937	England def. France 23–9	7,024	1936–37 European Rugby League Championship
3	15 May 1948	(United Kingdom) British Empire drew with Wales 36–36		

== Rugby League Tour Matches ==
Thrum Hall also saw the Halifax R.L.F.C. play host to international touring teams from Australia (sometimes playing as Australasia) and New Zealand from 1907–1994.

game	Date	Result	Attendance	Notes
1	14 December 1907	Halifax def. New Zealand 9–4	11,000	1907–08 All Golds tour
2	5 December 1908	Halifax def. Australia 12–8	6,000	1908–09 Kangaroo tour
3	26 December 1911	Australasia def. Halifax 23–5	10,000	1911–12 Kangaroo tour
4	31 December 1921	Australasia def. Halifax 35–6	12,000	1921–22 Kangaroo tour
5	18 September 1926	Halifax def. New Zealand 19–13	13,000	1926–27 New Zealand Kiwis tour
6	23 November 1929	Australia def. Halifax 58–9	8,440	1929–30 Kangaroo tour
7	30 September 1933	Australia def. Halifax 16–5	10,358	1933–34 Kangaroo tour
8	2 October 1937	Halifax def. Australia 12–2	14,500	1937–38 Kangaroo tour
9	27 November 1948	Australia def. Halifax 10–8	6,250	1948–49 Kangaroo tour
10	20 September 1952	Australia def. Halifax 39–7	18,773	1952–53 Kangaroo tour
11	5 December 1956	Halifax def. Australia 6–3	2,254	1956–57 Kangaroo tour
12	7 November 1959	Australia def. Halifax 17–5	8,274	1959–60 Kangaroo tour
13	29 November 1967	Australia def. Halifax 22–2	5,285	1967–68 Kangaroo tour
14	29 October 1986	Australia def. Halifax 36–2	7,193	1986 Kangaroo tour
15	6 November 1990	Australia def. Halifax 36–18	8,730	1990 Kangaroo tour
16	16 October 1994	Australia def. Halifax 26–12	8,352	1994 Kangaroo tour

== Bibliography ==
- Delaney, Trevor (1991). The Grounds Of Rugby League. Keighley: Trevor R. Delaney. ISBN 0-9509982-2-2.
