= 1954 Great Britain Lions tour =

- Manager: Hector Rawson; Tom Hesketh
- Tour captain(s): Dickie Williams
- Top point scorer(s): Lewis Jones (278)
- Top try scorer(s): Billy Boston (36)
- Top test point scorer(s): Lewis Jones (50)
- Top test try scorer(s): Billy Boston (6)
Summary
P	W	D	L
Total
32	21	1	10
Test match
6	3	0	3
Opponent
P	W	D	L
Australia
3	1	0	2
New Zealand
3	2	0	1

Tour chronology
- Previous tour: 1950
- Next tour: 1958

The 1954 Great Britain Lions tour was a tour by the Great Britain national rugby league team of Australia and New Zealand which took place between May and August 1954. Captained by Dickie Williams, the tour involved a schedule of 32 games: 22 in Australia and 10 in New Zealand, with two three-match Test Series against both nations.
The tour began inauspiciously, with Great Britain losing four of their first seven matches, including the First Test against Australia in Sydney. Moving into the Queensland leg, the Lions' results improved, and they won all nine of their matches in the state. This included victory in the Second Test in Brisbane.
A common feature of many of the tour matches was rough play, punches being throw in and out of tackles. The July 10 match against New South Wales was abandoned by the referee seventeen minutes into the second half due to persistent brawling by the players.
One week after the abandoned game, Australia won the Third Test to claim the Ashes by a 2–1 margin.
Moving to New Zealand, Great Britain lost the Second Test, but recovered to win the Third Test and the series, by a 2–1 margin.
The tour concluded with three matches in five days back in Australia at Sydney, Canberra and Maitland.
Despite being a British team – five of the squad were Welsh, two from Scotland and hooker Tom McKinney from Northern Ireland – the team played, and were often referred to by both the press at home and away, as England.

== Squad ==
This was the first Lions tour where the touring party travelled to Australia by air, instead of by ship.

Player	Pos.	Age (Note: Age as given in the Rugby League News for the first match against New South Wales)	Weight	Club	Tests on Tour	Games in Aus	Games in NZ (Note: Other than the Test Matches, team lists for the tour matches in New Zealand not available to the author at the time of page creation.)	Tries	Goals	FG	Points (Note: Tally excludes the match vs North Island, apart from Lewis Jones' one try and nine goals in that match.)
Ernie Ashcroft	Centre	29	13 st. 0 lb. (83 kg)	Wigan	5	11		11	0	0	33
Billy Boston	Wing	20	13 st. 9 lb. (87 kg)	Wigan	5	12		36	0	0	108
Jim Bowden	Prop	22	14 st. 5 lb. (91 kg)	Huddersfield	3	13		2	0	0	6
Brian Briggs	Second-row	21	14 st. 0 lb. (89 kg)	Huddersfield	1	11		3	0	0	9
Alf Burnell	Halfback	26	12 st. 4 lb. (78 kg)	Hunslet	1	10		7	0	0	21
Ted Cahill	Fullback	27	12 st. 0 lb. (76 kg)	Rochdale Hornets		8		0	14	0	28
Frank Castle	Wing	29	5 st. 9 lb. (36 kg)	Barrow	1	4		6	0	0	18
Jack Cunliffe	Fullback	31	11 st. 9 lb. (74 kg)	Wigan	1	10		9	29	0	85
Doug Greenall	Centre	26	11 st. 6 lb. (73 kg)	St Helens	1	14		13	0	0	39
Geoff Gunney	Second-row	20	14 st. 10 lb. (93 kg)	Hunslet	3	10		6	0	0	18
Tommy Harris	Hooker	25	12 st. 10 lb. (81 kg)	Hull	2	8		2	0	0	6
Gerry Helme	Halfback	31	11 st. 0 lb. (70 kg)	Warrington	5	12		5	0	0	15
John Henderson	Prop	24	14 st. 7 lb. (92 kg)	Workington		11		1	0	0	3
Phil Jackson	Centre	22	13 st. 10 lb. (87 kg)	Barrow	6	12		7	0	0	21
Lewis Jones	Centre	23	12 st. 6 lb. (79 kg)	Leeds	6	13		8	125	2	278
Tom McKinney	Hooker	26	14 st. 7 lb. (92 kg)	Salford	4	15		2	0	0	6
Terry O'Grady	Wing	19	12 st. 10 lb. (81 kg)	Oldham	5	10		28	0	0	84
Charlie Pawsey	Second-row	29	14 st. 13 lb. (95 kg)	Leigh	4	12		3	0	0	9
Alan Prescott	Prop	26	14 st. 10 lb. (93 kg)	St Helens	6	13		1	0	0	3
Raymond Price	Five-eighth	29	11 st. 11 lb. (75 kg)	Warrington	3	12		8	0	0	24
Nat Silcock	Second-row	24	15 st. 2 lb. (96 kg)	Wigan	3	14		6	0	0	18
Ken Traill	Lock	28	14 st. 0 lb. (89 kg)	Bradford Northern	2	11		1	0	0	3
Andrew Turnbull	Wing	23	11 st. 7 lb. (73 kg)	Barrow		2		2	0	0	6
Dave Valentine	Lock	27	13 st. 10 lb. (87 kg)	Huddersfield	5	13		6	0	0	18
Jack Wilkinson	Prop	24	14 st. 8 lb. (93 kg)	Halifax	3	14		5	0	0	15
Dickie Williams	Five-eighth	29	11 st. 4 lb. (72 kg)	Hunslet	3	12		8	0	0	24

== Australian leg ==
May 19	Western Division	11–29	Great Britain	Bathurst Showground, Bathurst
	Tries: 1 Keith Deacon; Goals: 4 Ken Fogarty (4)	[Team; Report Report]	Tries: 5 Billy Boston (2); Alf Burnell; Nat Silcock; Terry O'Grady; Goals: 7 Lewis Jones (7)	Attendance: 5,281; Gate: AU£ 1,289; Referee: Dave Cohen

Team list:

Western Division: FB: Ron Beaumont ( Canowindra), WG: P. Weldon (Trangie), CE: Joe Cohen ( Wellington), CE: Laurie Burke ( St Patrick's), WG: Peter Marks ( Warren), FE: Peter Bracken ( Parkes), HB: Keith Deacon (Dubbo), LK: R. Harben ( Baradine), SR: Frank Hogan ( St Patrick's), SR: Ron Potter (Our Boys), PR: R. Border (Coonabarabran), HK: Ken Fogarty ( Forbes), PR: Bryan Cameron (Trangie), Coach: Frank Bell (Arms Factory).
Great Britain: FB: Jack Cunliffe, WG: Billy Boston, CE: Terry O'Grady, CE: Doug Greenall, WG: Lewis Jones, FE: Phil Jackson, HB: Alf Burnell, LK: Ken Traill, SR: Brian Briggs, SR: Nat Silcock, PR: Jim Bowden, HK: Tom McKinney, PR: John Henderson.

May 22	Newcastle	11–10	Great Britain	Newcastle Sports Ground, Newcastle
	Tries: 1 Bobby Banks; Goals: 4 Dave Parkinson (4)	[Teams; Report Report]	Tries: 2 Frank Castle; Andrew Turnbull; Goals: 2 Ted Cahill (2)	Attendance: 22,825; Gate: AU£ 3,880; Referee: J. Underwood

Team list:

Newcastle: FB: Dave Parkinson (age 31) ( Cessnock), WG: Bill Callinan ( Maitland), CE: Geoff Hawkey (20) ( Centrals), CE: Frank Threlfo (22) ( Maitland), WG: Don Adams (21) ( Maitland), FE: Merv Walters ( Cessnock), HB: Bobby Banks (24) ( Waratah Mayfield), LK: Barry Levido (24) ( Cessnock), SR: Don Schofield (23) ( Cessnock), SR: Doug Chappell (23) ( Kurri), PR: Fred Brown (26) ( Maitland), HK: Bob Crane (30) ( Norths), PR: Doug Hawke (24) ( Norths), Coach: Frank Hawthorne ( Centrals).
Great Britain: FB: Ted Cahill, WG: Andrew Turnbull, CE: Doug Greenall, CE: Ernie Ashcroft, WG: Frank Castle, FE: Raymond Price, HB: Gerry Helme, LK: Dave Valentine, SR: Charlie Pawsey, SR: Brian Briggs, PR: Alan Prescott, HK: Tommy Harris, PR: Jack Wilkinson.

May 26	Riverina	26–36	Great Britain	Wagga Showground, Wagga Wagga
2.30pm	Tries: 4 Jim Denaher (2); Doug Cameron (2); Goals: 7 Johnny Graves (7)	[Teams; Report; Photo Report]	Tries: 8 Charlie Pawsey; Ernie Ashcroft; Tom McKinney; Andrew Turnbull; Phil Jackson; Geoff Gunney; Terry O'Grady; Alf Burnell; Goals: 6 Ted Cahill (6)	Attendance: 10,732; Gate: AU£ 1,565; Referee: Eric McIlhatton

Team list:

Riverina: FB: Peter McGrath ( Temora), WG: Johnny Graves ( Cootamundra), CE: Wal Towers ( Gundagai), CE: Gerry Lowe ( Cowra), WG: Jim Denaher (Ungarie), FE: Brian Longhurst ( Gundagai), HB: Doug Cameron ( Young), LK: Peter O'Connor ( Young), SR: Len Henman ( Temora), SR: Kenneth Fitzgerald ( Tarcutta), PR: Nevyl Hand ( Gundagai), HK: Ken Mulrooney ( Kangaroos), PR: G. Robinson ( Young).
Albert Paul ( Griffith) and Tom Ryan ( Temora) were selected but withdrew owing to injury.
Great Britain: FB: Ted Cahill, WG: Andrew Turnbull, CE: Phil Jackson, CE: Ernie Ashcroft, WG: Terry O'Grady, FE: Dickie Williams, HB: Alf Burnell, LK: Ken Traill, SR: Geoff Gunney, SR: Charlie Pawsey, PR: John Henderson, HK: Tom McKinney, PR: Jim Bowden.

May 29	Sydney	32–25	Great Britain	Sydney Cricket Ground, Sydney
	Tries: 6 Johnny Dougherty (3); Merv Lees; Keith Holman; Roy Bull; Goals: 7 Clive Churchill (7)	[Program; Report Report]	Tries: 5 Dickie Williams; Lewis Jones; Dave Valentine; Billy Boston; John Henderson; Goals: 5 Lewis Jones (5)	Attendance: 50,889; Gate: AU£ 7,115; Referee: Darcy Lawler

Team list:

Sydney: FB: Clive Churchill (age 27) ( Souths), WG: Ross Kite (22) ( St George), CE: Dick Poole (23) ( Newtown), CE: Merv Lees (21) ( St George), WG: Kevin Hole (21) ( St George), FE: Johnny Dougherty (22) ( Souths), HB: Keith Holman (26) ( Wests), LK: Harold Crocker (26) ( Parramatta), SR: Norm Provan (22) ( St George), SR: Jack Rayner (33) ( Souths), PR: Roy Bull (24) ( Manly), HK: Ken Kearney (28) ( St George), PR: Don Evenden (24) ( Norths).
Great Britain: FB: Jack Cunliffe, WG: Billy Boston, CE: Doug Greenall, CE: Ernie Ashcroft, WG: Lewis Jones, FE: Dickie Williams, HB: Gerry Helme, LK: Dave Valentine, SR: Nat Silcock, SR: Jack Wilkinson, PR: Jim Bowden, HK: Tommy Harris, PR: John Henderson.

May 30	Southern Division	17–17	Great Britain	Wollongong Showground, Wollongong
	Tries: 3 Darcy Russell; Harry Wells; Col Donohue; Goals: 4 Darcy Russell (4)	[Team; Report Report]	Tries: 3 Terry O'Grady (2); Frank Castle; Goals: 4 Ted Cahill (3); Jack Cunliffe	Attendance: 15,435; Gate: AU£ 2,573; Referee: Harold Gillard

Team list:

Southern Division: FB: Darcy Russell ( Wests), WG: Brian Carlson (21) ( C.B.C.), CE: Harry Wells (22) ( Wollongong), CE: Johnny Rouse ( Nowra), WG: Jack Lumsden ( Wests), FE: Col Donohue ( Corrimal), HB: Noel Hill ( Thirroul), SR: Noel Mulligan (28) ( C.B.C.), SR: Angus Miller ( Berry), LK: Jack Quinn ( Gerringong), PR: Austin Lawler ( C.B.C.), HK: Neville Gosson (Bargo), PR: Bruce Noble (21) ( Jamberoo).
Great Britain: FB: Ted Cahill, WG: Terry O'Grady, CE: Doug Greenall, CE: Jack Cunliffe, WG: Frank Castle, FE: Raymond Price, HB: Alf Burnell, LK: Ken Traill, SR: Dave Valentine, SR: Charlie Pawsey, PR: Alan Prescott, HK: Tom McKinney, PR: Jack Wilkinson.

June 5	New South Wales	22–11	Great Britain	Sydney Cricket Ground, Sydney
	Tries: 4 Keith Holman; Roy Bull; Noel Pidding; Brian Carlson; Goals: 5 Clive Churchill (3); Noel Pidding (2)	[Program; Report Report]	Tries: 3 Frank Castle (3); Goals: 1 Ted Cahill	Attendance: 55,518; Gate: AU£ 8,062; Referee: Jack O'Brien

Team list:

New South Wales: FB: Clive Churchill (age 27) ( Souths), WG: Noel Pidding (27) ( Maitland), CE: Dick Poole (23) ( Newtown), CE: Harry Wells (22) ( Wollongong), WG: Brian Carlson (21) ( C.B.C. Wollongong), FE: Johnny Dougherty (22) ( Souths), HB: Keith Holman (26) ( Wests), LK: Harold Crocker (26) ( Parramatta), SR: Norm Provan (22) ( St George), SR: Jack Rayner (33) ( Souths), PR: Roy Bull (28) ( Manly), HK: Ken Kearney (24) ( St George), PR: Jim Evans (24) ( Newtown).
The following were named as reserves but did not play: Bill Garvin (22) ( Balmain) and Barry Levido (22) ( Cessnock).
Great Britain: FB: Ted Cahill, WG: Terry O'Grady, CE: Doug Greenall, CE: Ernie Ashcroft, WG: Frank Castle, FE: Phil Jackson, HB: Gerry Helme, LK: Dave Valentine, SR: Nat Silcock, SR: Charlie Pawsey, PR: Alan Prescott, HK: Tom McKinney, PR: Jack Wilkinson.

=== 1st Test ===
June 12

Australia	37–12	Great Britain
Tries: 7 Ken McCaffery (2); Norm Provan; Kel O'Shea; Duncan Hall; Noel Pidding; Brian Carlson; Goals: 8 Noel Pidding (8)	Program; Report; Database	Tries: 2 Nat Silcock; Phil Jackson; Goals: 3 Lewis Jones (3)

Sydney Cricket Ground, Sydney
Attendance: 65,885
Gate: AU£ 16,842
Referee: Darcy Lawler

Team list:

Australia: FB: Clive Churchill (age 27) ( South Sydney), WG: Noel Pidding (27) ( Maitland), CE: Ken McCaffery (22) ( Toowoomba Souths), CE: Alex Watson (24) ( Brisbane Western Suburbs), WG: Brian Carlson (21) ( C.B.C. Wollongong), FE: Bob Banks (23) ( Toowoomba Newtown), HB: Keith Holman (26) ( Western Suburbs), LK: Harold Crocker (26) ( Parramatta), SR: Norm Provan (22) ( St George), SR: Kel O'Shea (20) (Ayr), PR: Roy Bull (28) ( Manly-Warringah), HK: Ken Kearney (28) ( St George), PR: Duncan Hall (28) ( Brisbane Western Suburbs).
The following were named as reserves but did not play: Harry Wells (22) ( Wollongong) and Brian Davies (23) ( Booval Swifts).
Great Britain: FB: Jack Cunliffe, WG: Lewis Jones, CE: Ernie Ashcroft, CE: Phil Jackson, WG: Frank Castle, FE: Raymond Price, HB: Gerry Helme, LK: Ken Traill, SR: Dave Valentine, SR: Nat Silcock, PR: Alan Prescott, HK: Tom McKinney, PR: Jack Wilkinson.

June 14	Brisbane	4–34	Great Britain	Brisbane Exhibition Ground, Brisbane
	Tries: 0 Goals: 2 Norm Pope (2)	[Team; Report; Report Report]	Tries: 8 Terry O'Grady (3); Gerry Helme (2); Billy Boston; Lewis Jones; Brian Briggs; Goals: 5 Lewis Jones (5)	Attendance: 20,000; Gate: AU£ 2,875; Referee: T. Hempenstall

Team list:

Brisbane: FB: Norm Pope (22) ( Valleys), WG: Wally McDonald (27) ( Valleys), CE: Noel Hurley ( Valleys), CE: Alex Watson (22) ( Wests), WG: Garry Barnett ( Valleys), FE: Keith Brown ( Wynnum), HB: Ken Booth ( Easts), LK: Jack Jones ( Valleys), SR: Stan Hassum ( Norths), SR: Norm McFadden ( Valleys), PR: Duncan Hall (28) ( Wests), HK: Johnny Flynn ( Wests), PR: Don Davey ( Norths).
Leo Johnson ( Souths) was selected in the Brisbane team but did not play owing to injury.
Great Britain: FB: Ted Cahill, WG: Billy Boston, CE: Phil Jackson, CE: Lewis Jones, WG: Terry O'Grady, FE: Dickie Williams, HB: Gerry Helme, LK: Dave Valentine, SR: Brian Briggs, SR: Charlie Pawsey, PR: Jim Bowden, HK: Tommy Harris, PR: John Henderson.

June 19	Queensland	32–34	Great Britain	Brisbane Cricket Ground, Brisbane
	Tries: 6 Ken McCaffery (2); Bob Buckley; Alex Watson; Denis Flannery; Duncan Hall; Goals: 7 Norm Pope (7)	[Team; Report Report]	Tries: 8 Billy Boston (3); Lewis Jones; Terry O'Grady; Gerry Helme; Dave Valentine; Charlie Pawsey; Goals: 5 Lewis Jones (5)	Attendance: 29,000; Gate: AU£ 5,244; Referee: Frank Ballard

Team list:

Queensland: FB: Norm Pope (age 22) ( Valleys), WG: Bob Buckley (23) (Ayr), CE: Alex Watson (22) ( Wests), CE: Ken McCaffery (24) ( Toowoomba Souths), WG: Denis Flannery (26) ( Ipswich Brothers), FE: Bob Banks (23) ( Toowoomba Newtown), HB: Cyril Connell Jr (26) ( Toowoomba Newtown), LK: Kel O'Shea (20) (Ayr), SR: Brian Davies (24) ( Booval Swifts), SR: Bernie Drew (25) ( Ipswich Railways), PR: Duncan Hall (28) ( Wests), HK: Alan Hornery (28) ( Booval Swifts), PR: Jack Rooney (27) ( Toowoomba All Whites).
Great Britain: FB: Ted Cahill, WG: Billy Boston, CE: Phil Jackson, CE: Lewis Jones, WG: Terry O'Grady, FE: Dickie Williams, HB: Gerry Helme, LK: Dave Valentine, SR: Brian Briggs, SR: Charlie Pawsey, PR: Jim Bowden, HK: Tom McKinney, PR: John Henderson.

June 20	Wide Bay	14–60	Great Britain	Maryborough Showgrounds, Maryborough
	Tries: 2 Cec Cooper; Noel Hawthorne; Goals: 4 B. Jamieson (2); Jim Gowdie (2)	[Teams; Report Report]	Tries: 14; Terry O'Grady (5); Billy Boston (4); Raymond Price (2); Geoff Gunney; Alf Burnell; Doug Greenall; Goals: 9 Jack Cunliffe (9)	Attendance: 5,912; Gate: AU£ 1,147; Referee: N. Saunders

Team list:

Wide Bay: FB: Angie Venardos (North Coast), WG: Jim Gowdie (Gympie), CE: Cec Cooper (Bundaberg), CE: Noel Hawthorne (North Coast), WG: B. Jamieson (Gympie), FE: Ted Barnes (Bundaberg), HB: D. Nixon (Bundaberg), LK: M. Ziebath (Lower South Burnett), SR: Don Bowes (Rovers), SR: H. Symonds (Bundaberg), PR: P. Iszlaub (Lower South Burnett), HK: Keith Weston (Western Suburbs), PR: WP. Hegerty ( Cherbourg).
Great Britain: FB: Jack Cunliffe, WG: Billy Boston, CE: Doug Greenall, CE: Dickie Williams, WG: Terry O'Grady, FE: Raymond Price, HB: Alf Burnell, LK: Geoff Gunney, SR: Charlie Pawsey, SR: Jack Wilkinson, PR: John Henderson, HK: Tommy Harris, PR: Jim Bowden.

June 22	Nth Qld Southern Districts	7–28	Great Britain	Mackay Showgrounds, Mackay
	Tries: 1 Ike Sturgeon; Goals: 2 Doug Shew (2)	[Teams; Report Report]	Tries: 6 Lewis Jones (2); Doug Greenall; Billy Boston; Jim Bowden; Jack Wilkinson; Goals: 5 Lewis Jones (5)	Attendance: 5,860; Gate: AU£ 1,250; Referee: Maurice Weis

Team list:

North Queensland Southern Districts/Zone: FB: Lou Della-Vedova ( Magpies), WG: Bill Rasmussen ( Bucas), CE: Ike Sturgeon ( Marian), CE: Ron O'Brien ( Bucas), WG: Brian Dimmock ( Collinsville), FE: Les Kieseker ( Magpies), HB: Doug Shew ( Marian), LK: Hume Ronald ( Carltons), SR: Kevin Elliott ( Magpies), SR: Charlie Ogilvie ( Magpies), PR: Ross Ryan ( Bucas), HK: Don McKenzie ( Magpies), PR: Ross Primrose ( Carltons).
Great Britain: FB: Lewis Jones, WG: Billy Boston, CE: Ernie Ashcroft, CE: Doug Greenall, WG: Nat Silcock, FE: Raymond Price, HB: Alf Burnell, LK: Geoff Gunney, SR: Brian Briggs, SR: Jack Wilkinson, PR: Jim Bowden, HK: Tom McKinney, PR: Tommy Harris.

June 24	Far North Queensland	18–39	Great Britain	Parramatta Park, Cairns
	Tries: 4 Allan Cripps (2); Pat Farrell; Jim Fallon; Goals: 3 Bill Allendorf (3)	[Teams; Report Report]	Tries: 9 Jack Cunliffe (2); Doug Greenall (2); Tommy Harris; Raymond Price; Alf Burnell; Dickie Williams; Geoff Gunney; Goals: 6 Jack Cunliffe (6)	Attendance: 6,545; Gate: AU£ 1,305; Referee: V. Renton

Team list:

Far North Queensland (North Queensland Northern Districts/Zone): FB: Frank Gill ( Kangaroos), WG: Allan Cripps (Uniteds), CE: R. Shambrook ( Kangaroos), CE: Pat Farrell (Herbert River), WG: R. Horn ( Kangaroos), FE: Hugh Kelly (22) ( Ivanhoes), HB: Dick Chant ( Ivanhoes), Jim Fallon (Mareeba), HK: R. Carter (Innisfail), Ossie Cumner (Ingham), Bill Allendorf ( Brothers), Danny Clifford (Tully), C. Blankensee ( Ivanhoes). The following were initially selected for the match but due to injury did not play: Gordon Farrelly ( Kangaroos), Mickey Shannon (Herbert River), N. McHardie and Eddie Kratzman (Tully).

For the Great Britain team, the account for this match in E.E. Christensen's Official Rugby League Year Book remarks that hooker Tommy Harris played on the wing but omits his name from the accompanying Great Britain team list, which lists Alan Prescott twice, as half-back and prop.

On the morning of the match (June 24) the team chosen as published in The Courier-Mail lists 14 players, with one to be omitted. This team differs from that given in the yearbook.

The local, Cairns Post match report mentions within the text the eight point-scorers, but no other British players: FB: Ted Cahill, WG: Tommy Harris, CE: Jack Cunliffe, CE: Doug Greenall, WG: Dickie Williams, FE: Raymond Price, HB: Alf Burnell and Geoff Gunney.

Hooker Tom McKinney was identified as playing in The Courier-Mail match report, winning "the scrums, 25 to 16, after leading 18 to 12 at half-time."

Alan Prescott was listed in both The Courier-Mail team list and the yearbook, but not mentioned in The Courier-Mail or Cairns Post match reports.

Four players listed in both The Courier-Mail team list but not in the yearbook, and not mentioned in the yearbook are: PR: Jack Wilkinson, John Henderson, Brian Briggs and Ken Traill. The above-named 14 players are credited with a match appearance in the Squad statistics.

The following four players listed only in the yearbook are not credited with an appearance for this Far North Queensland match: LK: Dave Valentine, SR: Charlie Pawsey, SR: Nat Silcock, PR: Jim Bowden.

June 27	North Queensland	13–39	Great Britain	Townsville Sports Reserve, Townsville
3pm	Tries: 1 Bob Buckley; Goals: 5 Nev Linde (5)	[Teams; Report; Photo Report]	Tries: 9 Terry O'Grady (4); Billy Boston (4); Phil Jackson; Goals: 6 Lewis Jones (6)	Attendance: 8,360; Gate: AU£ 1,821; Referee: R. Allison

Team list:

North Queensland: FB: Nev Linde (age 23) (Ayr), WG: Bob Buckley (Ayr), CE: Gordon Farrelly ( Kangaroos), CE: Graham Laird ( Magpies), WG: Graham \ Geoff Nash (Tully), FE: Brian Dimmock ( Collinsville), HB: Jack Russell-Green (Ayr), LK: Ross Primrose ( Carltons), SR: Roy Greenwood (Tully), SR: Bill Duell (Ayr), PR: Jack (Jerry) McAuliffe ( Brothers), HK: Ron Griffiths ( Ivanhoes), PR: Hume Ronald ( Carltons), Coach: Len Pegg (age 32).
Great Britain: FB: Lewis Jones, WG: Billy Boston, CE: Ernie Ashcroft, CE: Phil Jackson, WG: Terry O'Grady, FE: Dickie Williams, HB: Gerry Helme, LK: Dave Valentine, SR: Charlie Pawsey, SR: Nat Silcock, PR: Jim Bowden, HK: Tom McKinney, PR: Alan Prescott.

June 29	Central Queensland	12–21	Great Britain	Rockhampton Showgrounds, Rockhampton
	Tries: 2 Des McGovern; Alf Bawden; Goals: 3 Matt McCoy (3)	[Team; Report Report]	Tries: 5 Jack Cunliffe; Nat Silcock; Doug Greenall; Geoff Gunney; Raymond Price; Goals: 3 Ted Cahill (2); Jack Cunliffe	Attendance: 5,200; Gate: AU£ 1,047; Referee: H. Gilbert

Team list:

Central Queensland: FB: Rex Morrison ( Norths), WG: Des McGovern (26) ( Railways), CE: Matt McCoy (30) ( Fitzroys), CE: Cec Cooper (28) ( Brothers), WG: Joe Jackson (Gladstone), FE: George Williams ( Fitzroys), HB: Duncan Jackson ( Lifesavers), LK: Alf Bawden ( Fitzroys), SR: Ray (Neilsen) Nielson ( Fitzroys), SR: John Perrin ( Norths), PR: R. Gutheridge ( Fitzroys), HK: L. Tynan ( Railways), PR: B. Cridland ( Norths).
Great Britain: FB: Ted Cahill, WG: Nat Silcock, CE: Jack Cunliffe, CE: Doug Greenall, WG: Brian Briggs, FE: Raymond Price, HB: Alf Burnell, LK: Ken Traill, SR: Geoff Gunney, SR: Jack Wilkinson, PR: John Henderson, HK: Tom McKinney, PR: Jim Bowden

=== 2nd Test ===
July 3

Australia	21–36	Great Britain
Tries: 5 Brian Carlson (2); Norm Provan; Duncan Hall; Keith Holman; Goals: 3 Noel Pidding (3)	Teams; Report; Database	Tries: 6 Billy Boston (2); Charlie Pawsey; Dickie Williams; Phil Jackson; Gerry Helme; Goals: 8 Lewis Jones (8)

Brisbane Cricket Ground, Brisbane
Attendance: 47,800
Gate: AU£ 13,190
Referee: Darcy Lawler

Team list:

Australia: FB: Clive Churchill ( South Sydney), WG: Noel Pidding ( Maitland), CE: Noel Hazzard (Roma), CE: Alex Watson ( Brisbane Western Suburbs), WG: Brian Carlson ( C.B.C. Wollongong), FE: Bob Sullivan ( North Sydney), HB: Keith Holman ( Western Suburbs), LK: Harold Crocker ( Parramatta), SR: Norm Provan ( St George), SR: Kel O'Shea (Ayr), PR: Duncan Hall ( Brisbane Western Suburbs), HK: Ken Kearney ( St George), PR: Roy Bull ( Manly-Warringah).
The following were named as reserves but did not play: Cyril Connell Jr ( Toowoomba Newtown) and Brian Davies ( Booval Swifts).
Great Britain: FB: Lewis Jones, WG: Billy Boston, CE: Phil Jackson, CE: Ernie Ashcroft, WG: Terry O'Grady, FE: Dickie Williams, HB: Gerry Helme, LK: Dave Valentine, SR: Nat Silcock, SR: Charlie Pawsey, PR: Jim Bowden, HK: Tom McKinney, PR: Alan Prescott.

July 4	Toowoomba	14–25	Great Britain	Athletic Oval, Toowoomba
	Tries: 2 Cyril Connell Jr; Bevan Hoyle; Goals: 4 Bevan Hoyle (4)	[Team; Report Report]	Tries: 5 Raymond Price (2); Billy Boston; Doug Greenall; Jack Cunliffe; Goals: 5 Lewis Jones (5)	Attendance: 13,310; Gate: AU£ 3,321; Referee: Vic Lynagh

Team list:

Toowoomba: FB: Bevan Hoyle ( Souths), WG: Bill Monkland ( All Whites), CE: Noel Hazzard (Roma), CE: Athol Halpin ( All Whites), WG: Alan Norris ( Valleys), FE: Bob Banks ( Newtown), HB: Cyril Connell Jr ( Newtown), LK: Ron (Roy) Teys ( Valleys), SR: Don Furner ( Souths), SR: Bill Beardsworth ( Valleys), PR: Vince Soorley ( Newtown), HK: Kev Boshammer ( All Whites), PR: Neil Teys ( Newtown), Coach: Duncan Thompson ( Toowoomba).
Great Britain: FB: Lewis Jones, WG: Billy Boston, CE: Jack Cunliffe, CE: Doug Greenall, WG: Nat Silcock, FE: Raymond Price, HB: Alf Burnell, LK: Ken Traill, SR: Charlie Pawsey, SR: Geoff Gunney, PR: Jack Wilkinson, HK: Tom McKinney, PR: John Henderson.

July 7	Northern NSW	14–44	Great Britain	Grafton Showgrounds, Grafton
	Tries: 2 Noel McKay; Barry McConnell; Goals: 4 Brian Graham (4)	[Team; Report Report]	Tries: 10; Billy Boston (6); Jack Cunliffe (2); Doug Greenall (2); Goals: 7 Jack Cunliffe (7)	Attendance: 6,380; Gate: AU£ 1,221; Referee: Wal Sneddon

Team list:

Northern NSW: FB: Brian Graham (17) ( South Grafton), WG: John Rowlings ( Armidale), CE: Bruce Grace ( Gunnedah), CE: Jim Daley (Casino All Stars), WG: George Smith ( Nambucca), FE: Noel McKay (18) ( Bowraville), HB: Barry McConnell (Tweed), LK: Les Reid ( Scone), SR: Monty Porter ( East Tamworth), SR: George Alaban (Diggers), PR: Harry Melville ( Scone), HK: Alf Hardman ( Moree), PR: Arthur Henderson ( Moree).
Great Britain: FB: Jack Cunliffe, WG: Billy Boston, CE: Phil Jackson, CE: Doug Greenall, WG: Nat Silcock, FE: Raymond Price, HB: Alf Burnell, LK: Ken Traill, SR: Geoff Gunney, SR: Brian Briggs, PR: Alan Prescott, HK: Jack Wilkinson, PR: John Henderson.

July 10	New South Wales	17–6	Great Britain	Sydney Cricket Ground, Sydney
	Tries: 3 Merv Lees (2); Roy Bull; Goals: 4 Noel Pidding (4)	[Program; Report Report]	Tries: 2 Jack Cunliffe; Jack Wilkinson; Goals: 0	Attendance: 27,869; Gate: AU£ 3,671; Referee: Aub Oxford

Team list:

New South Wales: FB: Clive Churchill (age 27) ( Souths), WG: Noel Pidding (27) ( Maitland), CE: Harry Wells (22) ( Wollongong), CE: Merv Lees (21) ( St George), WG: Brian Carlson (21) ( C.B.C. Wollongong), FE: Dick Poole (23) ( Newtown), HB: Keith Holman (26) ( Wests), LK: Peter Diversi (22) ( Norths), SR: Norm Provan (22) ( St George), SR: Jack Rayner (33) ( Souths), PR: Jim Evans (24) ( Newtown), HK: Ken Kearney (28) ( St George), PR: Roy Bull (24) ( Manly).
The following were named as reserves but did not play: Ross Kite (22) ( St George) and Don Evenden (24) ( Norths),
Great Britain: FB: Geoff Gunney, WG: Brian Briggs, CE: Jack Cunliffe, CE: Doug Greenall, WG: Jack Wilkinson, FE: Raymond Price, HB: Alf Burnell, LK: Ken Traill, SR: Charlie Pawsey, SR: John Henderson, PR: Alan Prescott, HK: Dickie Williams, PR: Tommy Harris.

=== 3rd Test ===
July 17

Australia	20–16	Great Britain
Tries: 4 Alex Watson; Harry Wells; Noel Pidding; Peter Diversi; Goals: 4 Noel Pidding (4)	Program; Report	Tries: 4 Dickie Williams (2); Ernie Ashcroft; Dave Valentine; Goals: 2 Lewis Jones (2)

Sydney Cricket Ground, Sydney
Attendance: 67,577
Gate: AU£ 17,717
Referee: Darcy Lawler

Team list:

Australia: FB: Clive Churchill (age 27) ( South Sydney), WG: Brian Carlson (21) ( C.B.C. Wollongong), CE: Harry Wells (22) ( Wollongong), CE: Alex Watson (22) ( Brisbane Western Suburbs), WG: Noel Pidding (27) ( Maitland), FE: Bob Banks (23) ( Toowoomba Newtown), HB: Keith Holman (26) ( Western Suburbs), LK: Peter Diversi (22) ( North Sydney), SR: Norm Provan (22) ( St George), SR: Kel O'Shea (21) (Ayr), PR: Brian Davies (23) ( Booval Swifts), HK: Ken Kearney (28) ( St George), PR: Duncan Hall (28) ( Brisbane Western Suburbs),
Roy Bull ( Manly-Warringah) was selected but withdrew owing to injury. The following were named as reserves but did not play: Dick Poole (23) ( Newtown) and Don Evenden (24) ( North Sydney).
Great Britain: FB: Lewis Jones, WG: Billy Boston, CE: Phil Jackson, CE: Ernie Ashcroft, WG: Terry O'Grady, FE: Dickie Williams, HB: Gerry Helme, LK: Dave Valentine, SR: Nat Silcock, SR: Charlie Pawsey, PR: Alan Prescott, HK: Tom McKinney, PR: Jim Bowden.

== New Zealand leg ==
July 21	New Zealand Māori	4–14	Great Britain	Carlaw Park, Auckland
	Tries: 0 Goals: 2 R. Haggie (2)	[Teams; Report Report]	Tries: 4 Ernie Ashcroft (2); Doug Greenall; Frank Castle; Goals: 1 Jack Cunliffe	Attendance: 1,728

Team list:

For Māori the following 14 players were selected, with one to be omitted: R. Haggie, A. Berryman, J. Gibbons, J. Wright, T. Penny, William Sorensen, G. Turner, J. Wills, D. Diamond, John Yates, H. Maxwell, N. Rakena, R. Royal, J. Ratima.
For Great Britain: centre Doug Greenall scored a try. He was not, however, amongst the 13 players named prior to the match: FB: Jack Cunliffe, WG: Terry O'Grady, CE: Ernie Ashcroft, CE: Phil Jackson, WG: Frank Castle, FE: Raymond Price, HB: Alf Burnell, LK: Ken Traill, SR: Nat Silcock, SR: Brian Briggs, PR: Alan Prescott, HK: Tommy Harris, PR: John Henderson.

=== 1st Test ===
July 24

New Zealand	7–27	Great Britain
Tries: 1 John Bond; Goals: 2 Jim Haig; Des White	Teams; Report; Database	Tries: 7 Billy Boston (4); Ernie Ashcroft (2); Tommy Harris; Goals: 3 Lewis Jones (3)

Carlaw Park, Auckland
Attendance: 22,097
Referee: J. Griffin

Team list:

New Zealand: FB: Des White, WG: Cyril Eastlake ( Auckland), CE: Ron McKay ( Taranaki), CE: Tommy Baxter, WG: Jim Edwards ( Auckland), FE: George Menzies (West Coast), HB: Jim Haig, PR: Cliff Johnson ( Auckland), HK: Roy Roff, PR: William McLennan (West Coast), SR: John Bond ( Canterbury), SR: Frank Mulcare, LK: Alister Atkinson ( Canterbury).
Great Britain: FB: Lewis Jones, WG: Billy Boston, CE: Phil Jackson, CE: Ernie Ashcroft, WG: Terry O'Grady, FE: Raymond Price, HB: Gerry Helme, PR: Alan Prescott, HK: Tommy Harris, PR: Jack Wilkinson, SR: Geoff Gunney, SR: Charlie Pawsey, LK: Dave Valentine.

July 27	Wellington	18–61	Great Britain	Basin Reserve, Wellington
	Tries: 4 P. Jones (2); Williams; Rowels; Goals: 3 Gordon (3)	[Report Report]	Tries: 13; Terry O'Grady (4); Billy Boston (3); Doug Greenall (3); Dickie Williams; Jack Cunliffe; Tom McKinney; Goals: 11; Lewis Jones (11)	Attendance: 3,103

=== 2nd Test ===
July 31

New Zealand	20–14	Great Britain
Tries: 2 John Butterfield; Frank Mulcare; Goals: 7 Des White (7)	Database; Report	Tries: 2 Terry O'Grady; Jack Wilkinson; Goals: 4 Lewis Jones (4)

Wingham Park, Greymouth
Attendance: 4,240
Referee: M. Seagar

Team list:

New Zealand: FB: Des White, WG: Jim Edwards ( Auckland), CE: Ron Ackland, CE: Tommy Baxter, WG: Vern Bakalic, FE: William Sorensen ( Auckland), HB: Jim Haig, PR: Cliff Johnson (Auckland), HK: Lory Blanchard ( Canterbury), PR: William McLennan (West Coast), SR: John Butterfield ( Canterbury), SR: Frank Mulcare, LK: Alister Atkinson ( Canterbury).
Great Britain: FB: Lewis Jones, WG: Billy Boston, CE: Phil Jackson, CE: Doug Greenall, WG: Terry O'Grady, FE: Dickie Williams, HB: Gerry Helme, PR: Alan Prescott, HK: Tommy Harris, PR: Jack Wilkinson, SR: Geoff Gunney, SR: Brian Briggs, LK: Dave Valentine.

August 4	South Island	11–32	Great Britain	University Oval, Dunedin
	Tries: 1 Jim Haig; Goals: 4 John Butterfield (3); John Bond	[Result Report]	Tries: 6 Terry O'Grady (2); Phil Jackson (2); Alf Burnell; Jack Wilkinson; Goals: 7 Lewis Jones (7)	Attendance: 1,154

August 7	Canterbury	14–60	Great Britain	Lancaster Park, Christchurch
	Tries: 2 John Butterfield; Clark; Goals: 4 John Bond (4)	[Result Report]	Tries: 12; Billy Boston (4); Terry O'Grady (3); Alf Burnell (2); Geoff Gunney (2); Alan Prescott; Goals: 12; Lewis Jones (12)	Attendance: 1,544

August 9	North Island	7–42	Great Britain	Pukekura Park, New Plymouth
	Tries: 1 Goals: 2	[Result Report]	Tries: 8 Goals: 9	Attendance: 2,448

August 11	South Auckland	14–26	Great Britain	Rugby Park, Hamilton
	Tries: 2 G. Dow; Worth; Goals: 4 George (4)	[Report Report]	Tries: 6 Ernie Ashcroft (3); Jack Cunliffe; Dave Valentine; Gerry Helme; Goals: 4 Jack Cunliffe (4)	Attendance: 1,683

=== 3rd Test ===
August 14

New Zealand	6–12	Great Britain
Tries: 0 Goals: 3 Des White (3)	Database; Report	Tries: 2 Terry O'Grady; Raymond Price; Goals: 3 Lewis Jones (3)

Carlaw Park, Auckland
Attendance: 6,186
Referee: Wally Wilkinson

Team list:

New Zealand: FB: Des White, WG: Jim Edwards ( Auckland), CE: Ron Ackland, CE: Jim Austin ( Auckland), WG: Tommy Baxter, FE: William Sorensen (Auckland), HB: Jim Haig, PR: Cliff Johnson ( Auckland), HK: Lory Blanchard ( Canterbury), PR: William McLennan (West Coast), SR: John Butterfield ( Canterbury), SR: Frank Mulcare, LK: Alister Atkinson ( Canterbury).
Great Britain: FB: Lewis Jones, WG: Billy Boston, CE: Phil Jackson, CE: Ernie Ashcroft, WG: Terry O'Grady, FE: Raymond Price, HB: Alf Burnell, PR: Alan Prescott, HK: Tom McKinney, PR: Jim Bowden, SR: Geoff Gunney, SR: Charlie Pawsey, LK: Ken Traill.

August 16	Auckland	5–4	Great Britain	Carlaw Park, Auckland
	Tries: 1 Roy Roff; Goals: 1 Ian Grey	[Report Report]	Tries: 0 Goals: 2 Lewis Jones (2)	Attendance: 4,949

== Australian return leg ==
August 18	New South Wales	35–15	Great Britain	Sydney Cricket Ground, Sydney
	Tries: 9 Ross Kite (2); Jack Rayner (2); Brian Carlson (2); Keith Holman; Dick Poole; Norm Provan; Goals: 4 Ross Kite (2); Keith Holman; Clive Churchill	[Program; Teams; Report Report]	Tries: 3 Lewis Jones; Dave Valentine; Raymond Price; Goals: 3 Lewis Jones (3)	Attendance: 20,295; Gate: AU£ 2,815; Referee: Jack O'Brien

Team list:

New South Wales: FB: Clive Churchill (age 27) ( Souths), WG: Brian Carlson (21) ( C.B.C. Wollongong), CE: Dick Poole (23) ( Newtown), CE: Merv Lees (21) ( St George), WG: Ross Kite (22) ( St George), FE: Greg Hawick (23) ( Souths), HB: Keith Holman (26) ( Wests), LK: Peter Diversi (22) ( Norths), SR: Norm Provan (22) ( St George), SR: Jack Rayner (33) ( Souths), PR: Jim Evans (24) ( Newtown), HK: Ken Kearney (28) ( St George), PR: Roy Bull (24) ( Manly).
The following were named as reserves but did not play: Bobby Whitton (22) ( Newtown) and Harold Crocker (24) ( Parramatta).
Great Britain: FB: Lewis Jones, WG: Billy Boston, CE: Dave Valentine, CE: Ernie Ashcroft, FE: Raymond Price, HB: Gerry Helme, LK: Ken Traill, SR: Geoff Gunney, SR: Nat Silcock, PR: Jim Bowden, HK: Tom McKinney, PR: Alan Prescott, WG Dickie Williams.

August 21	Southern NSW	21–66	Great Britain	Manuka Oval, Canberra
2.30pm	Tries: 3 Angus Miller (2), Allan Hawke; Goals: 6 Johnny Graves (6)	[Team; Report Report]	Tries: 12; Nat Silcock (2); Dickie Williams (2); Brian Briggs (2); Phil Jackson; Jack Wilkinson; Ken Traill; Doug Greenall; Jim Bowden; Dave Valentine; Goals: 15; Lewis Jones (15)	Attendance: 3,253; Gate: AU£ 690; Referee: j. McIlhatton

Team list:

Southern NSW: FB: Keith Barnes ( Wollongong), WG: Jack Lumsden ( Wests), CE: Col Johnson ( Cooma Rovers), CE: Alan (Allan) Hawke ( Norths), WG: Johnny Graves ( Cootamundra), FE: Jim / Jack Gartner (Adaminaby), HB: Doug Cameron ( Young), LK: Noel Mulligan ( C.B.C.), SR: Angus Miller ( Berry), SR: Stan Greenwood ( Yass), PR: Ron (Ralph) Foster ( Norths), HK: Billy Rayner ( Yass), PR: Bill Hodges ( Wollongong).
Great Britain: FB: Lewis Jones, WG: Nat Silcock, CE: Phil Jackson, CE: Doug Greenall, WG: Dave Valentine, FE: Dickie Williams, HB: Gerry Helme, LK: Ken Traill, SR: Brian Briggs, SR: Jim Bowden, PR: Alan Prescott, HK: Tom McKinney, PR: Jack Wilkinson.

August 22	Coalfields	28–22	Great Britain	Maitland Showground, Maitland
	Tries: 6 Gus Gray (2); Bobby Banks; Doug Hawke; Ray Allsop; Lester Batey; Goals: 5 Dave Parkinson (5)	[Report Report]	Tries: 4 Ernie Ashcroft (2); Lewis Jones; Nat Silcock; Goals: 5 Lewis Jones (5)	Attendance: 9,585; Gate: AU£ 2,058; Referee: Wal Sneddon

Team list:

Newcastle Coalfields: FB: Dave Parkinson ( Cessnock), WG: Don Adams ( Maitland), CE: Bill Sneddon ( Cessnock), CE: Colin De Lore ( Lakes United), WG: Lester Batey ( Cessnock), FE: Ray Allsop ( Lakes United), HB: Bobby Banks ( Waratah Mayfield), LK: Gus Gray ( Lakes United), SR: Doug Hawke ( Norths), SR: Tom Pitman ( Lakes United), PR: Jack Mantle ( Norths), HK: Bob Crane ( Norths), PR: Fred Brown ( Maitland).
Great Britain: FB: Lewis Jones, WG: Doug Greenall, CE: Ernie Ashcroft, CE: Phil Jackson, WG: Nat Silcock, FE: Raymond Price, HB: Gerry Helme, LK: Dave Valentine, SR: Geoff Gunney, SR: Alan Prescott, PR: Brian Briggs, HK: Tommy Harris, PR: Jack Wilkinson.

== Statistics ==
Brian Carlson, Clive Churchill, Keith Holman, Ken Kearney, and Norm Provan all appeared in seven matches against Great Britain - in each instance three games for Australia, three for New South Wales and one for Sydney. The most tries scored against the Lions was six, by Brian Carlson. Keith Holman and Ken McCaffery each scored four tries. Noel Pidding scored the most points against the tourists, with 51 from three tries and 21 goals in five matches.
In the Test Series the leading scorers were Noel Pidding 36 (Australia) and Des White 22 (New Zealand). Lewis Jones scored the most points for the Lions against both opponents, 30 against Australia and 20 against New Zealand.
Billy Boston scored six tries in the six tests, including four against New Zealand. Dickie Williams scored three tries against Australia. Brian Carlson scored three tries in the Ashes Tests for Australia. No New Zealander scored more than a single try in their three Test series.

== Sources ==
Acronym	Item	Years	Database App	Notes
Direct Online Access
RLN	Rugby League News	1920-1973	Trove	Match Program in Sydney, Team Lists, Team Photos, Articles
RLP	Rugby League Project	1907–present	RLP Website	Test Match teams & scorers.
Sun	The Sun (Sydney)	1910-1954	Trove	Match Reports, Articles.
DT	The Daily Telegraph (Sydney)	1931-1954	Trove	Match Reports, Articles.
CM	The Courier-Mail	1933-1954	Trove	Match Reports, Articles.
-	Various Australian Regional Newspapers	up to 1954	Trove	Match Reports, Given Names of Players
-	New Zealand Newspapers	up to 1950	Papers Past	Match Reports.
Offline Resources
EECYB	E.E. Christensen's Official Rugby League Year Book	1946-1978	Copies at State Library of NSW	Teams, Point Scorers, Report. 1955 Yearbook covers the 1954 tour.
QRLG	Queensland Rugby League Gazette	1950-1955	Copies at State Library of Qld	Program for matches in Brisbane. Collection is predominantly of representative matches.
RRLG	Rockhampton Rugby League Gazette	1951-1968	Copies at State Library of Qld	Program for matches in Rockhampton. Collection includes club as well as Rockhampton and Central Queensland representative matches.
-	Ipswich Versus International Teams	1913-1975	Copies at SLQ & NLA	Match Report, Given Names & Club of Ipswich Players
-	The Bulimba Cup Era	1925-1972	Copies at SLQ & NLA	Clubs of Ipswich, Toowoomba and Brisbane players. This book includes Bulimba Cup match reports and team lists.
-	A History of Mackay Rugby League	1919-2015	Author's Website	Given Names & Club of Mackay Players
-	More Than The Foley Shield	1908-2014	Author's Website	Match report, team photos. Given Names & Club of North Queensland Players
