= Froggett =

Froggett is a surname. Notable people with the surname include:

- Don Froggett (1929–2011), English rugby league footballer
- Tom Froggett (born 1988), English cricketer
