= Fred Barrett (rugby league) =

Irish rugby league footballer and coach

Personal information
- Full name: Frederick Barrett
- Born: 1920
- Died: 2004 (aged 83–84)

Playing information
- Position: Centre, Halfback
Club
Years	Team	Pld	T	G	FG	P
1940–52	Keighley	296	45	1^{†}		137

Coaching information
Club
Years	Team	Gms	W	D	L	W%
195?–5?	Keighley	0	0	0	0
- ^{†}Goal type not recorded. Added to "total goals"

Fred Barrett (1920–2004) was an Irish professional rugby league footballer who played in the 1940s and 1950s, and coached in the 1950s. He played at club level for Keighley, as a centre or halfback, and later coached the club.

== Playing career ==
Barrett first appeared for Keighley at the start of the 1940–41 season and remained with the club until the end of the 1951–52 season. During that period he made 296 appearances for the club and scored 45 tries and kicked one goal. In his last playing season he captained the team and was the captain in Keighley's only peacetime Yorkshire Cup final as they lost 17–3 to Wakefield Trinity. Barrett predominantly played as a centre or halfback but as one of his teammates recalled, "During his career he played in every position except hooker".

== Coaching ==
After retiring from playing Barrett coached the club's A team before becoming first team coach at the end of the 1950s.
