= Gerry Lowe =

Gerry Lowe may refer to:

- Gerry Lowe (rugby league, born 1927) (1927–2018), English rugby league player
- Gerry Lowe (rugby league, born 1931) (1931–2012), Australian rugby league player
- Gerry Lowe (politician), Canadian politician in New Brunswick
