= Dennis Horner (rugby league) =

English rugby league footballer

Personal information
- Full name: Dennis Horner
- Born: c. 1924
- Died: November 1978 (aged 53–54)

Playing information
- Position: Hooker
Club
Years	Team	Pld	T	G	FG	P
1948–54	Wakefield Trinity	64	2	0	0	6

Dennis Horner (died 1978), was a professional rugby league footballer who played in the 1940s and 1950s. He played at club level for Wakefield Trinity, as a hooker.

== Playing career ==
=== County Cup Final appearances ===
Dennis Horner played hooker in Wakefield Trinity's 17-3 victory over Keighley in the 1951 Yorkshire Cup Final during the 1951–52 season at Fartown Ground, Huddersfield on Saturday 27 October 1951.

=== Notable tour matches ===
Dennis Horner played in Wakefield Trinity's match against Australia during the 1952–53 Kangaroo tour of Great Britain and France at Belle Vue, Wakefield in 1952.
