= Leslie Hirst =

English rugby league footballer who played in the 1940s and 1950s

Les Hirst
Personal information
- Full name: Leslie Hirst

Playing information
- Position: Fullback, Centre
Club
Years	Team	Pld	T	G	FG	P
1949–55	Wakefield Trinity	87	7	239	0	499

Leslie "Les" Hirst (birth unknown) is an English former professional rugby league footballer who played in the 1940s and 1950s. He played at club level for Wakefield Trinity, as a fullback or centre.

== Playing career ==
=== County Cup Final appearances ===
Les Hirst played at centre in Wakefield Trinity's 17-3 victory over Keighley in the 1951 Yorkshire Cup Final during the 1951–52 season at Fartown Ground, Huddersfield on Saturday 27 October 1951.

=== Club career ===
Les Hirst made his début for Wakefield Trinity during November 1949, he scored 107-goals in the 1951–52 Northern Rugby Football League season, and 103-goals in the 1953–54 Northern Rugby Football League season.
