= Norm Pope =

Norm Pope may refer to:

- Norm Pope (rugby league, born 1908) (1908–1985), Australian rugby league footballer
- Norm Pope (rugby league, born 1931) (1931–2003), Australian rugby league footballer
