= Reginald Hughes =

English rugby league footballer

Personal information
- Full name: Reginald Hughes

Playing information
- Position: Loose forward
Club
Years	Team	Pld	T	G	FG	P
1949–54	Wakefield Trinity	111	37	64	0	239

Reginald "Reg" Hughes (birth unknown) is a former professional rugby league footballer who played in the 1940s and 1950s. He played at club level for Wakefield Trinity, as a loose forward.

== Playing career ==
=== County Cup Final appearances ===
Reg Hughes played loose forward in Wakefield Trinity's 17-3 victory over Keighley in the 1951 Yorkshire Cup Final during the 1951–52 season at Fartown Ground, Huddersfield on Saturday 27 October 1951.

=== Club career ===
Reg Hughes made his début for Wakefield Trinity during September 1949.
