= Frank Barton (rugby league) =

Great Britain and England international rugby league footballer

Personal information
- Full name: Francis Barton
- Born: unknown
- Died: unknown

Playing information
- Position: Prop, Hooker
Club
Years	Team	Pld	T	G	FG	P
1941–53	Wigan	279	35	0	0	105
1953–57	Barrow	146
	Total	425	35	0	0	105
Representative
Years	Team	Pld	T	G	FG	P
1949	Lancashire	2	0	0	0	0
1951–52	England	2	0	0	0	0
1951	Great Britain	1	0	0	0	0
1952	British Empire XIII	1	0	0	0	0

Frank Barton (birth unknown – death unknown) was an English professional rugby league footballer who played in the 1940s and 1950s. He played at representative level for Great Britain, England and British Empire XIII, and at club level for Wigan and Barrow, as a prop, or hooker.

== Playing career ==
=== Wigan ===
Barton played at second-row in Wigan's 3–7 defeat by Widnes in the 1945–46 Lancashire Cup Final during the 1945–46 season at Wilderspool Stadium, Warrington on Saturday 27 October 1945, played at prop in the 14–8 victory over Warrington in the 1948 Lancashire Cup Final during the 1948–49 season at Station Road, Swinton on Saturday 13 November 1948, played at second-row in the 20–7 victory over Leigh in the 1949–50 Lancashire Cup Final during the 1949–50 season at Wilderspool Stadium, Warrington on Saturday 29 October 1949, played at prop in the 28–5 victory over Warrington in the 1950–51 Lancashire Cup Final during the 1950–51 season at Station Road, Swinton on Saturday 4 November 1950, played at prop in the 14–6 victory over Leigh in the 1951–52 Lancashire Cup Final during the 1951–52 season at Station Road, Swinton on Saturday 27 October 1951,

Barton played at prop and scored a try in Wigan's 8–3 victory over Bradford Northern in the 1947–48 Challenge Cup Final during the 1947–48 season at Wembley Stadium, London on Saturday 1 May 1948, in front of a crowd of 91,465.

=== Barrow ===
He played at prop in Barrow's 12–2 victory over Oldham in the 1954–55 Lancashire Cup Final during the 1954–55 season at Station Road, Swinton on Saturday 23 October 1954.

Barton played at prop in Barrow's 21–12 victory over Workington Town in the 1954–55 Challenge Cup Final during the 1954–55 season at Wembley Stadium, London on Saturday 30 April 1955, in front of a crowd of 66,513. He was omitted from the team for the 1957 Challenge Cup final defeat against Leeds, which would have made him the first player to make five appearances at Wembley.

=== International honours ===
Barton won caps for England while at Wigan in 1951 against Other Nationalities, in 1952 against Other Nationalities, won a cap for British Empire XIII while at Wigan in 1952 against New Zealand, and won a cap for Great Britain while at Wigan in 1951 against New Zealand.

Barton also represented Great Britain while at Wigan between 1952 and 1956 against France (1 non-Test match).
