= Gosson =

Gosson is a surname. Notable people with this surname include:

- Maurice A. de Gosson (born 1948), Austrian mathematician and physicist
- Neville Gosson (1927–2016), Australian professional rugby league footballer
- Stephen Gosson (1554–1624), English satirist
