= John Duggan (rugby, born 1929) =

English rugby league footballer (1929–2022)

Johnny Duggan
Personal information
- Full name: John Joseph Duggan
- Born: 16 January 1929; Wakefield, West Riding of Yorkshire, England
- Died: 21 July 2022 (aged 93); Auckland, New Zealand

Playing information
- Height: 5 ft 9 in (1.75 m)
- Weight: 13 st 7 lb (86 kg)

Rugby union
- Position: Wing
Club
Years	Team	Pld	T	G	FG	P
1945–47	Wakefield RFC

Rugby league
- Position: Wing
Club
Years	Team	Pld	T	G	FG	P
1947–≥49	Wakefield Trinity	108	70	0	0	210
Representative
Years	Team	Pld	T	G	FG	P
1949	Yorkshire	≥1

John Joseph Duggan (16 January 1929 – 21 July 2022) was an English rugby union, and professional rugby league footballer who played in the 1940s and 1950s. He played club level rugby union (RU) for Wakefield RFC, as a wing, and representative level rugby league (RL) for Yorkshire, and at club level for Wakefield Trinity, as a wing.

== Biography ==
John Joseph Duggan's birth was registered in Wakefield district, West Riding of Yorkshire, England. John, the first of eight children, was born at home in Georges Square adjacent to Wakefield Cathedral to mother Abigail (registered as spinster) and father Michael (registered as labourer). The family moved later to the Eastmoor Estate where John grew up. He migrated to New Zealand in his mid twenties initially settling in Whanganui where he played in the local professional soccer league (not rugby union as intended). John soon moved from Whanganui to Auckland where he met and married Phyllis Chapman. The couple had three sons. John established himself as a businessman eventually rising to the position of managing director of FS Tyler Ltd a now defunct retail furniture store in Anzac Avenue.

Duggan died in Auckland on 21 July 2022, at the age of 93.

== Playing career ==
At the age of 13, Duggan played Stand-Off/Fly-half, and captained St Austin's school but he did not play any further rugby until leaving school at 16 when he joined Wakefield RFC as a wing. In the 1945/46 season, he scored three tries in four appearances. The following season saw fourteen tries in twenty-two games. The 1947/48 season was his last amateur season, he played three games in 1947 scoring two tries.

He signed for Wakefield Trinity at Christmas 1947 when he was 18. In his first full season for Trinity, he made 28 appearances and scored seventeen tries, four of them in one game against Featherstone Rovers.

The Wakefield Express described how he became a firm favourite with the Wakefield Trinity crowd for "his strong running, elusiveness and never say die temperament".

In September 1949, he was selected to play for Yorkshire but had to withdraw having broken his nose in a game against St. Helens.

== County honours ==
Johnny Duggan played on the wing in Yorkshire's 3–12 defeat by Lancashire in the 1949 County Championship Final during the 1948–49 season at Thrum Hall, Halifax on Tuesday 3 May 1949, in front of a crowd of 7,000.

== County Cup Final ==
Johnny Duggan played on the wing in Wakefield Trinity's 17–3 victory over Keighley in the 1951 Yorkshire Cup Final during the 1951–52 season at Fartown Ground, Huddersfield on Saturday 27 October 1951.

Johnny Duggan emigrated to New Zealand in the early 1950s and began playing rugby union again, and on Saturday 19 July 1952 the Wakefield Express carried the headline, "Johnny Duggan to tour with New Zealanders?", in the article Johnny Duggan stated "I have filled in a form for reinstatement in a rugby union club and the Wanganui officials are backing me up. If it comes through there is every likelihood of seeing me in England with the New Zealand touring team next season – at least, that is what the locals says who have been very impressed with my displays in practice", however he did not participate in the 1953–54 New Zealand rugby union tour of Britain, Ireland, France and North America.
