= Ernest Luckman =

English rugby league footballer

Personal information
- Full name: Ernest Luckman
- Born: 5 March 1926 Pontefract district, England
- Died: July 1988 (aged 62) Wakefield, England

Playing information
- Position: Fullback, Centre
Club
Years	Team	Pld	T	G	FG	P
1947–48	Featherstone Rovers	17	1	0	0	3
1948–54/55	Wakefield Trinity	166	16	4	0	56
	Total	183	17	4	0	59

Ernest Luckman (5 March 1926 – July 1988) was an English professional rugby league footballer who played in the 1940s and 1950s. He played at club level for Featherstone Rovers and Wakefield Trinity, as a fullback or centre.

== Background ==
Ernest Luckman's birth was registered in Pontefract district, West Riding of Yorkshire, England, and he died aged 62 in Wakefield, West Yorkshire, England.

== Playing career ==
=== County Cup Final appearances ===
Ernest Luckman played fullback in Wakefield Trinity's 17-3 victory over Keighley in the 1951 Yorkshire Cup Final during the 1951–52 season at Fartown Ground, Huddersfield on Saturday 27 October 1951.

=== Club career ===
Ernest Luckman made his début for Featherstone Rovers as a centre on Wednesday 1 January 1947, he played 5-matches in the 1946–47 season, and 12-matches in the 1947–48 season, mainly as a fullback, he made his début for Wakefield Trinity during April 1948.
