= Keith Parkinson (rugby league) =

Australian rugby league footballer (1919–2000)

Personal information
- Full name: Keith Alwyn Parkinson
- Born: 16 February 1919 Cessnock, New South Wales, Australia
- Died: 23 April 2000 (aged 81)

Playing information
- Position: Wing
Club
Years	Team	Pld	T	G	FG	P
1944–48	Balmain	39	23	1	0	71
Representative
Years	Team	Pld	T	G	FG	P
1945	NSW City	1	3	0	0	9
- Source: As of 25 April 2019
- Relatives: Dave Parkinson (brother)

Keith Parkinson was an Australian professional rugby league footballer who played in the 1940s. He played for Balmain in the New South Wales Rugby League (NSWRL) competition during the club's second golden era where they won 3 premierships.

== Background ==
Parkinson came from Cessnock, New South Wales originally and was the brother of Balmain player Dave Parkinson.

== Playing career ==
Parkinson began his first grade career with Balmain in 1944. Parkinson would go on to score 12 tries in his debut year as the club finished second on the table. Parkinson played alongside his brother Dave as Balmain defeated Newtown 19-16 in the grand final. After the game, Newtown challenged Balmain to a rematch as due to the rules at the time, Newtown were allowed to force a rematch as they had finished as minor premiers. In the grand final challenge, Parkinson scored a try as Balmain won the match and the premiership 12-8 at the Sydney Cricket Ground.

In 1945, Parkinson was selected to play for NSW City against NSW Country where he scored a hat-trick. Parkinson missed out on selection in the 1945 grand final team which lost to Eastern Suburbs 22-18. Parkinson subsequently missed out selection in the Balmain sides which won the 1946 and 1947 premierships victories. Parkinson retired following the conclusion of the 1948 season.

== Post playing ==
Following his retirement as a player, Parkinson became a qualified referee.
