= 1951–52 Lancashire Cup =

- Structure: Regional knockout championship
- Teams: 14
- Winners: Wigan
- Runners-up: Leigh

The 1951–52 Lancashire Cup was the thirty-ninth occasion on which rugby league's Lancashire Cup competition was held. It was won by Wigan who defeated Leigh in the final.

== Background ==
Overall, the number of teams entering this year's competition remained the same as last year's total of 14. The same pre-war fixture format was retained. This season saw no bye but one "blank" or "dummy" fixture in the first round. There was also one bye but no "blank" fixture" in the second round. As last season, all the first round matches of the competition will be played on the basis of two legged, home and away, ties – and the remainder of the rounds remaining on straight forward knock-out basis.

== Competition and results ==
=== Round 1 – first leg ===
Involved 7 matches (with no bye and one "blank" fixture) and 14 clubs.

| Game No | Fixture date | Home team | Score | Away team | Venue | agg | Att | Rec | Notes | Ref |
|---|---|---|---|---|---|---|---|---|---|---|
| 1 | Sat 01 Sep 1951 | Barrow | 52–5 | Liverpool City | Craven Park | | | | | |
| 2 | Sat 01 Sep 1951 | Rochdale Hornets | 7–8 | Oldham | Athletic Grounds | | | | | |
| 3 | Sat 01 Sep 1951 | St. Helens | 4–8 | Belle Vue Rangers | Knowsley Road | | 15,000 | | | |
| 4 | Sat 01 Sep 1951 | Salford | 7–14 | Leigh | The Willows | | | | | |
| 5 | Sat 01 Sep 1951 | Swinton | 16–28 | Wigan | Station Road | | | | | |
| 6 | Sat 01 Sep 1951 | Warrington | 6–16 | Workington Town | Wilderspool | | | | | |
| 7 | Sat 01 Sep 1951 | Widnes | 14–6 | Whitehaven | Naughton Park | | | | | |
| 8 | | blank | | blank | | | | | | |

=== Round 1 – second leg ===
Involved 7 matches (with no bye and one "blank" fixture) and 14 clubs. These are the reverse fixture from the first leg.

| Game No | Fixture date | Home team | Score | Away team | Venue | agg | Att | Rec | Notes | Ref |
|---|---|---|---|---|---|---|---|---|---|---|
| 1 | Thu 06 Sep 1951 | Liverpool City | 5–30 | Barrow | Mill Yard, Knotty Ash | 10–82 | | | | |
| 2 | Tue 04 Sep 1951 | Oldham | 21–5 | Rochdale Hornets | Watersheddings | 29–12 | | | | |
| 3 | Thu 06 Sep 1951 | Belle Vue Rangers | 2–2 | St. Helens | Belle Vue Stadium | 10–6 | 5,000 | | | |
| 4 | Wed 12 Sep 1951 | Leigh | 15–9 | Salford | Kirkhall Lane | 29–16 | | | | |
| 5 | Wed 12 Sep 1951 | Wigan | 15–5 | Swinton | Central Park | 43–21 | | | | |
| 6 | Mon 03 Sep 1951 | Workington Town | 20–3 | Warrington | Borough Park | 36–9 | | | | |
| 7 | Wed 05 Sep 1951 | Whitehaven | 11–9 | Widnes | Recreation Ground | 14–23 | | | | |
| 8 | | blank | | blank | | | | | | |

=== Round 2 – quarterfinals ===
Involved 3 matches (with one bye) and 7 clubs

| Game No | Fixture date | Home team | Score | Away team | Venue | agg | Att | Rec | Notes | Ref |
|---|---|---|---|---|---|---|---|---|---|---|
| 1 | Mon 24 Sep 1951 | Oldham | 17–9 | Widnes | Watersheddings | | | | | |
| 2 | Wed 26 Sep −1951 | Belle Vue Rangers | 12–2 | Workington Town | Belle Vue Stadium | | | | | |
| 3 | Thu 27 Sep 1951 | Barrow | 12–16 | Leigh | Craven Park | | | | | |
| 4 | | Wigan | | bye | | | | | | |

=== Round 3 – semifinals ===
Involved 2 matches and 4 clubs

| Game No | Fixture date | Home team | Score | Away team | Venue | agg | Att | Rec | Notes | Ref |
|---|---|---|---|---|---|---|---|---|---|---|
| 1 | Mon 15 Oct 1951 | Wigan | 22–9 | Belle Vue Rangers | Central Park | | | | | |
| 2 | Tue 16 Oct 1951 | Oldham | 10–14 | Leigh | Watersheddings | | | | | |

=== Final ===
Wigan won the trophy by beating Leigh by the score of 14–6. The match was played at Station Road, Pendlebury, (historically in the county of Lancashire). The attendance was 33,230 and receipts were £5,432. This was the sixth (and last) in Wigan's record breaking run of six consecutive Lancashire Cup victories.

| Game No | Fixture date | Home team | Score | Away team | Venue | agg | Att | Rec | Notes | Ref |
|---|---|---|---|---|---|---|---|---|---|---|
| | Saturday 27 October 1951 | Wigan | 14–6 | Leigh | Station Road | | 33,230 | £5,432 | 1 | |

==== Teams and scorers ====
| Wigan | No. | Leigh |
|---|---|---|
| | Teams | |
| Jack Cunliffe | 1 | Jimmy Ledgard |
| Gordon Ratcliffe | 2 | Bill Kindon |
| George Roughley | 3 | Trevor Allan |
| Ernie Ashcroft | 4 | Norman Harris |
| Brian Nordgren | 5 | Frank Morgan |
| Jack Broome | 6 | Edward Kerwick |
| Johnny Alty | 7 | Ken Baxter |
| Ken Gee | 8 | Harry Edden |
| Ronald Mather | 9 | Joe Egan (c) |
| Frank Barton | 10 | Jeff Burke |
| Nat Silcock, Jr. | 11 | Charlie Pawsey |
| Jack Large | 12 | Walt Tabern |
| Harry Street | 13 | Peter Foster |
| | Coach | Joe Egan |
| 14 | score | 6 |
| 3 | HT | 0 |
| | Scorers | |
| | Tries | |
| Brian Nordgren (2) | T | Harris (1) |
| Jack Broome (1) | T | Morgan (1) |
| Jack Large (1) | T | |
| | Goals | |
| Ken Gee (1) | G | |
| Referee | | Albert Dobson, Pontefract |

Scoring – Try = three (3) points – Goal = two (2) points – Drop goal = two (2) points

=== The road to success ===
All the first round ties were played on a two leg (home and away) basis.

The first club named in each of the first round ties played the first leg at home.

the scores shown in the first round are the aggregate score over the two legs.

First round
Swinton | 41
Wigan | 43
blank
blank
St. Helens | 6
Belle Vue Rangers | 10
Warrington | 9
Workington Town | 36
Rochdale Hornets | 12
Oldham | 29
Widnes | 23
Whitehaven | 14
Barrow | 30
Liverpool City | 5
Salford | 16
Leigh | 29

Second round
Wigan
bye
Belle Vue Rangers | 12
Workington Town | 2
Oldham | 17
Widnes | 9
Barrow | 12
Leigh | 16

Semifinals
Wigan | 22
Belle Vue Rangers | 9
Oldham | 10
Leigh | 14

Final
Wigan | 14
Leigh | 6

== Notes and comments ==
1 * Station Road was the home ground of Swinton from 1929 to 1932 and at its peak was one of the finest rugby league grounds in the country and it boasted a capacity of 60,000. The actual record attendance was for the Challenge Cup semi-final on 7 April 1951 when 44,621 watched Wigan beat Warrington 3–2

== See also ==
- 1951–52 Northern Rugby Football League season
- Rugby league county cups
