= Dave Parkinson =

Australia international rugby league footballer

Personal information
- Full name: David Parkinson
- Born: 21 March 1923 Cessnock, New South Wales, Australia
- Died: 23 October 1978 (aged 55)

Playing information
- Position: Fullback
Club
Years	Team	Pld	T	G	FG	P
1940–43	Cessnock
1944–46	Balmain	32	5	0	0	15
1947	Babinda
1948	Balmain	21	2	1	0	8
1949	Parkes
1950–5?	Cessnock
	Total	53	7	1	0	23
Representative
Years	Team	Pld	T	G	FG	P
1946	Sydney
1946	Australia	3	0	0	0	0
1946	New South Wales	1	1	0	0	3
1954	Newcastle
- Relatives: Keith Parkinson (brother)

Dave Parkinson (21 March 1923 – 23 October 1978) was an Australian professional rugby league footballer who played in the 1940s and 1950s. An Australian international and New South Wales interstate representative fullback, he played club football in the Newcastle Rugby League for Cessnock, in Sydney's NSWRFL Premiership for Balmain, and also in country Queensland and New South Wales during his career.

Parkinson played four seasons in Newcastle for the Cessnock club before moving to Sydney. Signing with the Balmain club, the 1944 NSWRFL season was his first and at the end of it he played in the Premiership Final against Newtown which the Tigers won 12-8. Balmain again reached the final in the 1945 NSWRFL season, which was a 22-18 loss against Eastern Suburbs.

The following season Parkinson was selected to play representative football for Sydney against South Coast and then during the 1946 Great Britain Lions tour was a surprise selection for Australia, becoming Kangaroo no. 229 when he was chosen to play at fullback in all three tests against the touring Great Britain team. He made several try-saving tackles, which earned him praise as the Kangaroos held Great Britain to an 8-all draw in the first test. Parkinson retained his place for the second test which the British won 14-5. Again playing at fullback in the third test, after only 7 minutes Parkinson was tackled heavily and suffered a broken bone in his ankle. However he continued playing and Australia were further depleted when Arthur Clues was sent off for punching and the Kangaroos lost 20-7. Due to his injury Parkinson missed Balmain's victory over St George in the 1946 premiership decider. The following season he played in Queensland for Babinda as again Balmain won the premiership. Parkinson returned for the 1948 NSWRFL season and once again Balmain reached the premiership decider but lost 8-5 to Western Suburbs.

Parkinson played at Parkes in 1949, then rejoined Cessnock in 1950. He played at fullback and kicked goals in each of Cessnock's Newcastle Rugby League grand finals wins of 1950, 1954 and 1955. During the 1954 Great Britain Lions tour he captained Newcastle in 11-10 and 28-22 wins against Great Britain. Parkinson also enjoyed Newcastle Rugby League premierships with his club, Cessnock in 1954 and 1955.
