= Terry O'Grady =

GB & England international rugby league footballer

- O'Grady in 1954

Personal information
- Full name: Terence Patrick O'Grady
- Born: 10 April 1934 Oldham, Lancashire
- Died: 12 January 1987 (aged 52) Bolton

Playing information
- Position: Wing
Club
Years	Team	Pld	T	G	FG	P
1950–57	Oldham	140	105	0	0	315
1957–58	Wigan	54	32	0	0	96
1958–62	Warrington	138	84	0	0	252
	Total	332	221	0	0	663
Representative
Years	Team	Pld	T	G	FG	P
1952–55	England	2	1	0	0	3
1954–61	Great Britain	6	0	0	0	0
1952–61	Lancashire	13	16	0	0	48

Terence O'Grady (10 April 1934 – 12 January 1987) was an English professional rugby league footballer who played in the 1950s and 1960s. He played at representative level for Great Britain and England, and at club level for Oldham, Wigan and Warrington, as a wing.

== Career ==
While at Oldham, O'Grady won caps for England in 1952 against Wales and in 1955 against Other Nationalities, and played for Great Britain on the 1954 Great Britain Lions tour against Australia and New Zealand. He also appeared against New Zealand in 1961.

During O'Grady's time at the club, Oldham were defeated 2-12 by Barrow in the 1954 Lancashire Cup Final during the 1954–55 season at Station Road, Swinton, on 23 October 1954. Two years later, however, Oldham secured the 1956 Lancashire Cup with a 10-3 victory over St. Helens during the 1956–57 season. The following season, on 19 October 1957, O'Grady played as a left wing and scored a try in Oldham's 13-8 defeat of Wigan in the 1957 Lancashire Cup Final during the 1957–58 season.

On his 1957 début for Wigan, O'Grady scored a hat-trick of tries. He played at right wing in the Warriors' 13–9 victory over Workington Town in the 1957–58 Challenge Cup Final at Wembley Stadium on 10 May 1958, in front of a crowd of 66,109.

O'Grady scored 28 tries for Warrington during the 1961–62 season.

== Death ==
On 10 January 1987, O'Grady collapsed in the car park following the final of the 1986–87 John Player Trophy at Burnden Park, Bolton. On 12 January 1987, he died, aged 52.
