= 1950–51 Lancashire Cup =

Rugby league competition

- Structure: Regional knockout championship
- Teams: 14
- Winners: Wigan
- Runners-up: Warrington

The 1950–51 Lancashire Cup was the thirty-eighth occasion on which the RFL Lancashire Cup competition had been held.

Wigan won the trophy by beating Warrington by the score of 28–5

The match was played at Station Road, Pendlebury, (historically in the county of Lancashire). The attendance was 42,541 and receipts were £6,222.

The attendance was a new record for the Lancashire Cup final and would only ever be broken once in the future

This was the fifth of Wigan's record breaking run of six consecutive Lancashire Cup victories.

== Background ==
Overall, the number of teams entering this year's competition remained the same as last year's total of 14.

The same pre-war fixture format was retained. This season saw no bye but one "blank" or "dummy" fixture in the first round. There was also one bye but no "blank" fixture" in the second round.

As last season, all the first round matches of the competition will be played on the basis of two legged, home and away, ties – and the remainder of the rounds remaining on straight forward knock-out basis.

== Competition and results ==
=== Round 1 – first leg ===
Involved 7 matches (with no bye and one "blank" fixture) and 14 clubs

Game No	Fixture date	Home team	Score	Away team	Venue	agg	Att	Rec	Notes	Ref
1	Sat 02 Sep 1950	Belle Vue Rangers	5–47	Workington Town	Belle Vue Stadium					
2	Sat 02 Sep 1950	Leigh	27–0	Barrow	Kirkhall Lane					
3	Sat 02 Sep 1950	Oldham	21–5	Rochdale Hornets	Watersheddings					
4	Sat 02 Sep 1950	Liverpool Stanley	5–18	Warrington	Mill Yard, Knotty Ash					
5	Sat 02 Sep 1950	Swinton	10–19	St. Helens	Station Road		10,000			
6	Sat 02 Sep 1950	Whitehaven	0–20	Wigan	Recreation Ground					
7	Sat 02 Sep 1950	Widnes	15–13	Salford	Naughton Park					
8		blank		blank						

=== Round 1 – second leg ===
Involved 7 matches (with no bye and one "blank" fixture) and 14 clubs. These are the reverse fixture from the first leg.

Game No	Fixture date	Home team	Score	Away team	Venue	agg	Att	Rec	Notes	Ref
1	Mon 11 Sep 1950	Workington Town	8–6	Belle Vue Rangers	Borough Park	55–11				
2	Wed 13 Sep 1950	Barrow	14–6	Leigh	Craven Park	14–33				
3	Tue 12 Sep 1950	Rochdale Hornets	2–14	Oldham	Athletic Grounds	7–35				
4	Wed 13 Sep 1950	Warrington	73–0	Liverpool City	Wilderspool	91–5				
5	Wed 13 Sep 1950	St. Helens	11–3	Swinton	Knowsley Road	30–13	18,200			
6	Mon 11 Sep 1950	Wigan	34–4	Whitehaven	Central Park	54–4				
7	Wed 13 Sep 1950	Salford	7–0	Widnes	The Willows	20–15				
8		blank		blank						

=== Round 2 – quarterfinals ===
Involved 3 matches (with one bye) and 7 clubs

Game No	Fixture date	Home team	Score	Away team	Venue	agg	Att	Rec	Notes	Ref
1	Mon 25 Sep 1950	Workington Town	8–15	Oldham	Borough Park					
2	Wed 27 Sep 1950	Leigh	14–28	Warrington	Kirkhall Lane					
3	Wed 27 Sep 1950	St. Helens	20–3	Salford	Knowsley Road		17,673			
4		Wigan		bye						

=== Round 3 – semifinals ===
Involved 2 matches and 4 clubs

Game No	Fixture date	Home team	Score	Away team	Venue	agg	Att	Rec	Notes	Ref
1	Tue 10 Oct 1950	Oldham	0–5	Warrington	Watersheddings					
2	Wed 11 Oct 1950	St. Helens	7–9	Wigan	Knowsley Road		33,000			-

=== Final ===
Game No	Fixture date	Home team	Score	Away team	Venue	agg	Att	Rec	Notes	Ref
	Saturday 4 November 1950	Wigan	28–5	Warrington	Station Road		42,541	£6,222	1	

==== Teams and scorers ====
Wigan	№	Warrington
	teams	
Jack Cunliffe	1	Eric Frodsham
Gordon Ratcliffe	2	Brian Bevan
Jack Broome	3	Ron Ryder
George Roughley	4	Albert Naughton
Brian Nordgren	5	Albert Johnson
Cecil Mountford	6	Bryn Knowelden
Johnny Alty	7	Gerry Helme
Ken Gee	8	William "Billy" Derbyshire
Ronnie Mather	9	Ike Fishwick
Frank Barton	10	Jim Featherstone
Ted Slevin	11	Harry Bath
Nat Silcock, Jr.	12	Bob Ryan
Billy Blan	13	Harry Palin
28	score	5
15	HT	2
	Scorers	
	Tries	
Jack Cunliffe (1)	T	Albert Naughton (1)
Brian Nordgren (2)	T	
Ted Slevin (1)	T	
George Roughley (1)	T	
Johnny Alty (1)	T	
	Goals	
Ken Gee (5)	G	Harry Palin (1)
Referee		George Phillips, Widnes

Scoring – Try = three (3) points – Goal = two (2) points – Drop goal = two (2) points

=== The road to success ===
All the first round ties were played on a two leg (home and away) basis.

The first club named in each of the first round ties played the first leg at home.

the scores shown in the first round are the aggregate score over the two legs.

First round
Swinton	13
St. Helens	30
Widnes	15
Salford	20
Whitehaven	4
Wigan	54
blank
blank
Belle Vue Rangers	11
Workington Town	55
Oldham	35
Rochdale Hornets	7
Leigh	33
Barrow	14
Liverpool City	5
Warrington	91

Second round
St. Helens	20
Salford	3
Wigan
bye
Workington Town	8
Oldham	15
Leigh	14
Warrington	28

Semifinals
St. Helens	7
Wigan	9
Oldham	0
Warrington	5

Final
Wigan	28
Warrington	5

== Notes and comments ==
1 * The attendance of 42,541 was a new record for the Lancashire Cup final beating the previous by just over 3,500, and would only ever be broken once in the future

2 * Station Road was the home ground of Swinton from 1929 to 1932 and at its peak was one of the finest rugby league grounds in the country and it boasted a capacity of 60,000. The actual record attendance was for the Challenge Cup semi-final on 7 April 1951 when 44,621 watched Wigan beat Warrington 3–2

== See also ==
- 1950–51 Northern Rugby Football League season
- Rugby league county cups
