= Gerald Lockwood =

English rugby league footballer

Personal information
- Full name: Gerald Lockwood
- Born: 16 December 1927 Lupset, Wakefield, England
- Died: 23 February 2015 (aged 87) Wakefield, England

Playing information
- Position: Fullback
Club
Years	Team	Pld	T	G	FG	P
	Keighley
1954–56	Halifax	11	1	31	0	65
1956	Wakefield Trinity	15	0	39	0	42
	Total	26	1	70	0	107

Gerald "Gerry" Lockwood (16 December 1927 – 23 February 2015) was an English professional rugby league footballer who played in the 1940s and 1950s. He played at club level for Keighley, Halifax and Wakefield Trinity, as a fullback.

== Background ==
Gerry Lockwood was born in Lupset, Wakefield, West Riding of Yorkshire, England, he worked as a plumber, and he died aged 87 in Wakefield, West Yorkshire, England.

== Playing career ==
Lockwood started his career at Keighley, and played in the club's 1951–52 Yorkshire Cup final defeat against Wakefield Trinity. In October 1954, he was transferred to Halifax in exchange for Bryn Hopkins and Des Clarkson.

Lockwood made his début for Wakefield Trinity, and scored four goals in the 32–3 victory over Hull Kingston Rovers at Belle Vue on Saturday 14 January 1956, he scored 2-goals in the 10–14 defeat by Barrow in the 1956 Challenge Cup quarter final at Belle Vue in front of a crowd of 20,514, he scored a goal in the 5–9 defeat by Keighley during the 1955–56 season at Lawkholme Lane, Keighley. With Frank Mortimer's return to fitness, Gerry Lockwood was restricted to 'A' Team appearances, but with Mortimer playing for Great Britain against Australia, Gerry Lockwood made his only appearance of the 1956–57 season in the match against Featherstone Rovers at Post Office Road, Featherstone on Saturday 17 November 1956, this was to be his last match, as 2-weeks later, aged 28, he suffered a broken leg during an 'A' Team match that ended his rugby league playing career.
