= Bert Holcroft =

English former rugby league coach and sports writer (1925–2021)

Personal information
- Full name: Herbert Holcroft
- Born: 8 August 1925 Leigh, Lancashire
- Died: 17 August 2021 (aged 96) Leigh, Lancashire

Coaching information
Club
Years	Team	Gms	W	D	L	W%
1965–66	Eastern Suburbs	36	3	1	32	8

Bert Holcroft was an English rugby league footballer, coach and writer on rugby league coaching.

== Military service ==
Bert Holcroft joined the Royal Navy at aged 18 and was 20 when he served aboard the Flower-class corvette HMS Petunia. On 6 June 1944, HMS Petunia was among the naval force that took part in the invasion of Normandy, and on D-Day. HMS Petunia was an escort vessel for one of the assault convoys. During the assault the ship received a "mayday" from an American tank landing ship that had struck a mine. Holcroft was among those who saved 60 of the soldiers from the tank landing ship. In 2016 Holcroft was decorated with the Legion d'Honneur by the French government - an award Holcroft dedicated to the men saved on D-Day.

== Rugby league ==
After the war Bert Holcroft played rugby league for amateur team Wigan Road Working Men's RLFC as well as the reserve team of Leigh. He also coached the B and Colts junior teams for Leigh.

In the 1960s Holcroft and his wife, Bridget, moved to Australia where he coached junior side Murwillumbah Brothers to successive premierships in the Tweed Rugby League in 1961 and 1962. Holcroft also coached the Bundaberg representative team where he introduced new training techniques relating to diet and weight training.

Holcroft was appointed as coach of Eastern Suburbs in the New South Wales Rugby League premiership in 1965. Easts were a weak side at the time, having won just five matches in the two preceding seasons under Dick Dunn and fellow Englishman Nat Silcock Jr.. Under Holcroft they only won three games of 36 contested in the two seasons he was in charge; in 1966 Easts became the most recent (as of 2022) premiership team not to win a game during a season.

Over the years Holcroft developed his training and fitness techniques into a series of books for rugby and football. Holcroft died on August 17, 2021.
