= Don Froggett =

England international rugby league footballer

Personal information
- Full name: Donald Froggett
- Born: 1929 Wakefield, England
- Died: 12 February 2011 (aged 81) Wakefield, England

Playing information
- Position: Centre
Club
Years	Team	Pld	T	G	FG	P
1948–59	Wakefield Trinity	219	94	1	0	284
Representative
Years	Team	Pld	T	G	FG	P
1953–56	Yorkshire	8	3	0	0	9
1953	England	1	0	0	0	0

Donald Froggett (1929 – 12 February 2011) was an English professional rugby league footballer who played in the 1940s and 1950s. He played at representative level for England and Yorkshire, and at club level for Wakefield Trinity (captain), as a centre.

== Background ==
Don Froggett was born in Wakefield, West Riding of Yorkshire, England, and he died aged 81 in Wakefield, West Yorkshire, England.

== Playing career ==
=== Club career ===
Froggett played at centre in Wakefield Trinity's 17-3 victory over Keighley in the 1951 Yorkshire Cup Final during the 1951–52 season at Fartown Ground, Huddersfield on Saturday 27 October 1951.

Froggett's Testimonial match at Wakefield Trinity took place against Huddersfield on Saturday 31 January 1959.

=== Representative honours ===
Froggett won a cap for England while at Wakefield Trinity in the 7-5 victory over France at Odsal Stadium, Bradford on Saturday 7 November 1953.

Froggett was selected for Yorkshire County XIII while at Wakefield Trinity during the 1953/54, 1954/55, 1955/56 and 1956/57 seasons.
