= Ronald Mather =

English rugby league footballer

Personal information
- Full name: Ronald Mather
- Born: 9 March 1927 Wigan district, Lancashire
- Died: 2 October 2011 (aged 84) Wigan, Lancashire

Playing information
- Weight: Unknown
- Position: Hooker
Club
Years	Team	Pld	T	G	FG	P
1950–57	Wigan	211	11	0	0	33
Representative
Years	Team	Pld	T	G	FG	P
1953	Lancashire	1	0	0	0	0

Ronald "Ronnie" Mather (9 March 1927 – 2 October 2011) was an English professional rugby league footballer who played in the 1950s. He played at representative level for Lancashire and at club level for Wigan as a hooker. He coached at club level for Warrington (A-Team) and scouted for Warrington.

== Background ==
Ronnie Mather's birth was registered in Wigan district, Lancashire, England, he worked as a machinist at the National Coal Board, and later as a mechanical instructor at the NCB Old Boston training centre at Haydock, Lancashire. He lived on Woolden St, Newtown, Wigan, with his wife Elsie (nee Smales), whom he married in 1949 at St Marks, Newtown, Wigan. He died aged 84 in Wigan district, Greater Manchester, England.

== Playing career ==
=== Championship final appearances ===
Ronnie Mather played hooker in Wigan's 13–6 victory over Bradford Northern in the Championship Final during the 1951–52 season at Leeds Road, Huddersfield on Saturday 10 May 1952.

=== County League appearances ===
Ronnie Mather played in Wigan's victory in the Lancashire League during the 1951–52 season .

=== County Cup Final appearances ===
Ronnie Mather played hooker in Wigan's 28–5 victory over Warrington in the 1950–51 Lancashire Cup Final during the 1950–51 season at Station Road, Swinton, on Saturday 4 November 1950, played hooker in the 14–6 victory over Leigh in the 1951–52 Lancashire Cup Final during the 1951–52 season at Station Road, Swinton, on Saturday 27 October 1951, and played hooker in the 8–16 defeat by St. Helens in the 1953–54 Lancashire Cup Final during the 1953–54 season at Station Road, Swinton on Saturday 24 October 1953.

=== Club career ===
Ronnie Mather made his début for Wigan against Dewsbury at Crown Flatt on Saturday 19 August 1950, and played his last game for Wigan against Whitehaven at Recreation Ground on Saturday 21 September 1957.
