= Cardiff RLFC =

Defunct rugby league team in Cardiff

Club information
- Exited: 1951

Former details
- Ground: Penarth Road

Cardiff RLFC was a professional rugby league team based in Cardiff, Wales, which played a single season in the Rugby Football League, finishing second bottom in 1951-52. The club withdrew because of low attendances. The club played for a time at Penarth Road.

== See also ==
- Rugby Football League expansion
- Sport in Cardiff
- Rugby league in Wales
