= Rugby Football League expansion =

Since the formation of Super League in 1996, the Rugby Football League (RFL) has continually expanded the top three divisions of rugby league in Britain with an aim to expand the competitions outside the traditional heartlands.

== History ==
Throughout the 20th century rugby league had tried to expand outside the heartlands of the M62 corridor without success. Teams such as Liverpool Stanley, Nottingham City and Cardiff all failed. Many see London Broncos as the first successful expansion team because in the 1990s, and in the early years of Super League, they challenged for silverware.

In the years leading up to the formation of Super League, teams from outside the heartlands were fast tracked into Super League such as London Broncos and PSG. After the failure of PSG and later Gateshead Thunder, the RFL chose to stop entering teams straight into Super League. The last team to be entered straight into Super League were Catalans Dragons in 2007 and are seen by many as the most successful expansion team.

Since 2003, expansion teams have been entered into the lower leagues although not all teams have entered at the same level. In 2003 London Skolars were entered in League 1 (division three), whereas Toulouse Olympique were entered into the Championship (division two).

Since 2010 the RFL has said every new team has to enter from the bottom of the professional pyramid in League 1 and work their way up through all the leagues.

== Expansion clubs ==
=== Previous expansion ===
Confirmed expansion clubs
Team	Location	Entered	Exited
Doncaster	(England) Doncaster, South Yorkshire	1951	N/A
Cardiff	(Wales) Cardiff	1951	1952
London Broncos	(England) London	1980	N/A
Sheffield Eagles	(England) Sheffield, South Yorkshire	1984	N/A
Mansfield Marksmen	(England) Mansfield, Nottinghamshire	1984	1993
Chorley Lynx	(England) Preston, Lancashire	1989	2004
PSG	(France) Paris	1996	1997
Gateshead Thunder	(England) Gateshead, Tyne and Wear	1999	1999
Newcastle Thunder	(England) Newcastle, Tyne and Wear	2000	N/A
London Skolars	(England) Harringey, London	2003	2023
Blackpool Panthers	(England) Blackpool, Lancashire	2005	2010
Celtic Crusaders	(Wales) Wrexham	2006	2011
Catalans Dragons	(France) Perpignan	2007	N/A
Toulouse Olympique	(France) Toulouse, Haute-Garonne	2009	2011
South Wales Scorpions	(Wales) Mountain Ash, Rhondda Cynon Taf	2010	2017
North Wales Crusaders	(Wales) Wrexham	2012	N/A
Hemel Stags	(England) Hemel Hempstead, Hertfordshire	2013	2018
Gloucestershire All Golds	(England) Cheltenham, Gloucestershire	2013	2017
Oxford	(England) Oxford, Oxfordshire	2013	2017
Coventry Bears	(England) Coventry, West Midlands	2015	2020
Toulouse Olympique	(France) Toulouse, Haute-Garonne	2016	N/A
Toronto Wolfpack	(Canada) Toronto, Ontario	2017	2020
Cornwall	(England) Penryn, Cornwall	2021	2025

The first team to be entered into the Super League were Paris Saint-Germain in 1996 who played on the opening night of Super League against Sheffield Eagles in Paris. However the French franchise folded in 1997 after only two seasons competing in Super League. The only team playing outside the heartlands of Yorkshire and Lancashire now was the London Broncos. A new franchise, Gateshead Thunder were chosen to replace PSG in 1999 and had a successful first season finishing 6th, just outside the playoffs. Gateshead left the league after one season to merge with Hull Sharks after just one season. In 2000 a new Gateshead Thunder was formed and were accepted into the National League 2 and were promoted in 2008 but relegated the next season. They then finished bottom of League 1 three years in a row.

In 2003 a second London team were formed and accepted into National League 2, London Skolars and have not yet been promoted. In 2005 Blackpool Panthers were accepted into the National League 2 and finished as the wooden-spooners two years in a row. They gradually improved until they folded in 2009.

No more Super League franchises were awarded for the next few years with promotion and relegation between the Super League and Championship reintroduced. In 2005 however, a new franchise was awarded to the Catalans Dragons, the second French team to be chosen to play in Super League. Despite finishing bottom of the league in their first season, they were seen as a huge success in Super League and in their second season they became the first French team to reach a Challenge Cup final.

The next franchise to be introduced was Welsh team Celtic Crusaders in 2006 to enter into the then National League 2 and the next season they won promotion to the Championship. In only their first season in the Championship their licence to play in Super League was accepted and they made their Super League debut in 2009, becoming the first Welsh team to play in the top division of rugby league in Britain. The Crusaders played in only three seasons in Super League, reaching the playoffs once in 2010, went into administration in 2011 and were later dissolved. During the same period a third French team, Toulouse Olympique were accepted to play in the Championship in 2009 and were largely successful until they were relegated to League 1 in 2011 but chose to return to the French Elite One Championship instead.

In 2010 it was announced that all new clubs would enter the pyramid at League 1 (rugby league). The first team to be part of the new expansion plans were South Wales Scorpions in 2010, the second Welsh team to play in the pyramid. A new Welsh team North Wales Crusaders, formed to replace the Celtic Crusaders and won promotion to the Championship in 2013 but were relegated the next season due to the restructure of the professional structure.

In 2012 three new clubs were announced as part of the expansion; Hemel Stags, Oxford Rugby League and Cheltenham-based Gloucestershire All Golds. These were the first teams in southern England outside London to play professional rugby league.

In 2015, Coventry Bears were accepted to play in League 1 having previously played in the now defunct National League 3 and the Conference League South. The same year Toulouse Olympique were offered a return to England for the 2016 season to play in League 1 and again try to achieve promotion to Super League via the Championship.

In April 2016 it was announced Toronto Wolfpack would become the first professional trans-Atlantic sports team. The team, which started play in 2017, has a British base in Bradford and plays home and away games in blocks of five.

=== Future expansion ===
At the Toronto Wolfpack conference, Toronto CEO Eric Perez said if the Toronto team was successful the plan was to establish a professional team in Montreal and possibly Vancouver with the aim to eventually have professional teams on the East Coast of America in Boston and New York. He said they aim to enter a Montreal franchise in 2019.

In late 2016 Manchester Rangers had submitted a bid to enter League 1.

London Chargers have also expressed an interest in joining the professional structure.

In January 2017 it was announced an American consortium from Florida were in talks with the RFL to enter a team similar to the Toronto Wolfpack. The club would be based in Jacksonville.

Hemel Stags RFL place was bought out by a Canadian consortium, which plans to move the team to Ottawa, Canada. The team was provisionally accepted to join League 1 for the 2020 season, but they later severed this until the 2021 season. The team is likely to be known as Ottawa Aces. A consortium in New York are also attempting to enter the League in 2021 as well, they would be known as New York City Rugby League.

There has also been expressions of interest in joining the RFL system from Spain and Serbia through Valencia Huracanes and Red Star Belgrade RL.

=== Failed expansion attempts ===
In 2013 the Rugby Football League (RFL) picked seven teams to be part of the League 1 expansion. Four of those teams were successful and joined the professional ranks of rugby league. The first of these teams to be accepted were Northampton Rebels who were owned by association football club Northampton Town FC but pulled out after Northampton Town decided they did not want to field a team that had no chance of success.

Chester Gladiators also applied but were unsuccessful despite being very close to the rugby league heartlands as they failed to attract players and fans to join the club. Medway Dragons were one of two clubs based around London to apply, the other being Hemel Stags, and would have joined London Broncos and London Skolars as clubs in the professional structure but pulled out as they chose to continue competing in the London and South League.

== Locations ==
Locations of expansion teams in England and Wales. Bold clubs are still active. Italics indicates a failed attempt of expansion.
French expansion teams. Bold clubs are still active.
Canadian expansion team.

== See also ==
- Expansion of the National Rugby League
- European Rugby League
