= Charlie Pawsey =

Former GB & England international rugby league footballer

Personal information
- Full name: Charles Pawsey
- Born: 15 April 1923 Salford, England
- Died: 10 January 2012 (aged 88) Salford, England

Playing information
- Position: Second-row
Club
Years	Team	Pld	T	G	FG	P
1947–47	Belle Vue Rangers
1947–55	Leigh	216	27	0	0	81
	Huddersfield
	Total	216	27	0	0	81
Representative
Years	Team	Pld	T	G	FG	P
1951–53	England	8	0	0	0	0
1952–54	Great Britain	7	1	0	0	3

Charles Pawsey (15 April 1923 – 10 January 2012) was an English professional rugby league footballer who played in the 1940s and 1950s. He played at representative level for Great Britain and England, and at club level for Langworthy ARLFC, Belle Vue Rangers, Leigh and Huddersfield, as a scrum cap wearing second-row.

== Background ==
Charlie Pawsey was born in Salford, Lancashire, England, he worked as a stevedore, and he died aged 88 in Salford, Greater Manchester, England.

== Playing career ==
=== Club career ===
Pawsey played at second-row in Leigh's 7–20 defeat by Wigan in the 1949 Lancashire Cup Final during the 1949–50 season at Wilderspool Stadium, Warrington on Saturday 29 October 1949, and played at second-row in the 6–14 defeat by Wigan in the 1951 Lancashire Cup Final during the 1951–52 season at Station Road, Swinton on Saturday 27 October 1951.

=== International honours ===
Pawsey won caps for England while at Leigh in 1951 against Wales, in 1952 against Other Nationalities (2 matches) and Wales, in 1953 against France (2 matches), Wales, and Other Nationalities, and won caps for Great Britain while at Leigh in 1952 against Australia (3 matches), and in 1954 against Australia (2 matches), and New Zealand (2 matches).

Pawsey also represented Great Britain while at Leigh between 1952 and 1956 against France (3 non-Test matches).
