= Joseph Phillips (rugby league) =

NZ rugby league footballer

Joe Phillips
Personal information
- Full name: Joseph Anthony Phillips
- Born: 30 December 1924 New Zealand
- Died: 16 May 1969 (aged 44) London, England

Playing information
- Position: Fullback
Club
Years	Team	Pld	T	G	FG	P
1950–56	Bradford Northern	232	47	661	0	1463
1957–59	Keighley	80	20	225	0	516
	Total	312	67	886	0	1979
Representative
Years	Team	Pld	T	G	FG	P
≈1954	Rugby League XIII	≥1
1953	Other Nationalities	4		12		24

Joseph Anthony Phillips (30 December 1924 – 16 May 1969) was a New Zealand rugby union and professional rugby league footballer who played in the 1950s. He played representative level rugby union (RU) for Junior All Blacks (New Zealand Schoolboys), and representative level rugby league (RL) for Other Nationalities and Rugby League XIII, and at club level for Bradford Northern and Keighley, as a fullback.

== Playing career ==
=== Bradford Northern ===
Phillips played fullback, and scored three conversions in Bradford Northern's 6-13 defeat by Wigan in the Championship Final during the 1951–52 season at Leeds Road, Huddersfield on Saturday 10 May 1952. He made 232 appearances for the club, scoring 47-tries and 661-goals.

=== Keighley ===
Phillips joined Keighley in 1957. He spent three seasons at the club, playing 80 games and scoring 20 tries and 225 goals.

=== International honours ===
Phillips represented Other Nationalities (RL) while at Bradford Northern, and represented Rugby League XIII (RL) while at Bradford Northern.

== Post-playing career ==
In 1964, Phillips, along with former team-mate Trevor Foster, helped to lead a campaign which resulted in the reformation of Bradford Northern after the club folded a year earlier due to increasing financial difficulties. He later served as the club's chairman, and was also a director at Keighley.

== Death and legacy ==
Phillips died on 16 May 1969 (the day before the 1968–69 Challenge Cup Final) in a hotel in London, aged 44, leaving a wife; Margaret, and three children; Catherine, Charles and Joseph. Later that year, Bradford named a trophy in his honour, the Joe Phillips Memorial Trophy, which is contested for between Phillips' former clubs, Bradford and Keighley.
