= Alf Burnell =

GB & England international rugby league footballer (1924–2019)

Personal information
- Full name: Alfred Burnell
- Born: 14 June 1924 Hunslet district, England
- Died: 25 August 2019 (aged 95) Leeds, England

Playing information
- Position: Scrum-half
Club
Years	Team	Pld	T	G	FG	P
≤1939–58	Hunslet	352	113	0	0	339
1945	→ Leeds (guest)	1	0	0	0	0
	Total	353	113	0	0	339
Representative
Years	Team	Pld	T	G	FG	P
1949–50	Yorkshire	3
1950–52	England	4	4	0	0	12
1951	British Empire XIII
1951–54	Great Britain	3	0	0	0	0

Alfred Burnell (14 June 1924 – 25 August 2019), also known by the nickname of "Ginger", was an English professional rugby league footballer who played in the 1930s, 1940s and 1950s. He played at representative level for Great Britain, England, Yorkshire and British Empire XIII, and at club level for Hunslet and Leeds (World War II guest), as a scrum-half.

== Background ==
Burnell's birth was registered in Hunslet district, South Leeds, West Riding of Yorkshire, England. During World War II, Burnell served in the Royal Navy, and spent four years as a submariner on detachment as part of the United States task force in Australasia.

In his later years, he lived in Wharfedale in the Yorkshire Dales. He died aged 95 in St James's University Hospital, Leeds, West Yorkshire, England, and his funeral took place at St Wilfred's Parish Church, Pool-in-Wharfedale, on 12 September 2019.

== International honours ==
Burnell won caps for England while at Hunslet in 1950 against France, in 1951 against Wales, and France, in 1952 against Wales, and won caps for Great Britain while at Hunslet in 1951 against New Zealand (2 matches), and in 1954 against New Zealand.

He also played once in the British Empire XIII team.
