= Raymond Price (rugby) =

GB & Wales international rugby league footballer

Ray Price

Personal information
- Full name: Harold Raymond Price
- Born: 18 January 1924 Bedwellty, Wales
- Died: September 1988 (aged 64) Blaina, Wales

Playing information
- Weight: 11 st 4 lb (72 kg)

Rugby union
- Position: Fly-half/First Five-Eighth
Club
Years	Team	Pld	T	G	FG	P
≤1947–47	Abertillery RFC

Rugby league
- Position: Stand-off
Club
Years	Team	Pld	T	G	FG	P
1947–53	Belle Vue Rangers	204	40	24	0	168
1953–57	Warrington	113	23	0	0	69
1957–58	St. Helens	20	5	14	0	43
	Total	337	68	38	0	280
Representative
Years	Team	Pld	T	G	FG	P
1948–53	Wales	6	3	1	0	11
1955	Other Nationalities	2	1	0	0	3
1954–57	Great Britain	9	2	0	0	6

Harold Raymond Price (18 January 1924 – September 1988) was a Welsh rugby union, and professional rugby league footballer who played in the 1940s and 1950s. He was regarded as one of the finest post-war Stand-offs in the sport.

At club level he played rugby union (RU) for Abertillery RFC, and at representative level he played rugby league (RL) for Great Britain, Other Nationalities and Wales. At club level he played for Belle Vue Rangers, Warrington and St. Helens.

== Background ==
Price was born in Blaina, Wales.

== Playing career ==
=== International honours ===
Ray Price won caps for Wales (RL) while at Belle Vue Rangers 1948...1953 6-caps, won caps for Other Nationalities (RL) while at Warrington in 1955 2-caps, and won caps for Great Britain (RL) while at Warrington on the 1954 Great Britain Lions tour against Australia, and New Zealand (2 matches), in 1955 against New Zealand, in 1956 against Australia (3 matches), and in 1957 against France (2 matches).

Ray Price was selected for the Great Britain Squad while at Warrington for the 1957 Rugby League World Cup in Australia. However, Ray Price did not participate in any of the three matches.

Ray Price also represented Great Britain while at Belle Vue Rangers between 1952 and 1956 against France (1 non-Test match).

=== Championship final appearances ===
Ray Price played in Warrington's 8–7 victory over Halifax the Championship Final during the 1953–54 season at Maine Road, Manchester on Saturday 8 May 1954, in front of a crowd of 36,519.

=== Challenge Cup Final appearances ===
Ray Price played stand-off in Warrington's 4–4 draw with Halifax in the 1954 Challenge Cup Final during the 1953–54 season at Wembley Stadium, London on Saturday 24 April 1954, in front of a crowd of 81,841, and played stand-off in the 8–4 victory over Halifax in the 1954 Challenge Cup Final replay during the 1953–54 season at Odsal Stadium, Bradford on Wednesday 5 May 1954, in front of a record crowd of 102,575 or more.

=== County Cup Final appearances ===
Ray Price played stand-off in Belle Vue Rangers' 7-10 defeat by Wigan in the 1947 Lancashire Cup Final during the 1947–48 season at Wilderspool Stadium, Warrington on Saturday 1 November 1947.

== Honoured at Warrington Wolves ==
Ray Price is a Warrington Wolves Hall of Fame inductee.
