= 1951–52 Yorkshire Cup =

- Structure: Regional knockout championship
- Teams: 16
- Winners: Wakefield Trinity
- Runners-up: Keighley

The 1951–52 Yorkshire Cup was the forty-fourth occasion on which rugby league's Yorkshire Cup competition was held. Wakefield Trinity won the trophy by beating Keighley in the final.

== Background ==
This season no junior/amateur clubs were invited to take part, but newly elected to the league Doncaster were added to the competition, thus the number of entrants remained at the same as last season's total number of sixteen.

This in turn resulted in no byes in the first round.

The competition again followed the original formula of a knock-out tournament, with the exception of the first round which was still played on a two-legged home and away basis.

== Competition and results ==
=== Round 1 - First leg ===
Involved 8 matches (with no byes) and 16 clubs

All first round ties are played on a two-legged home and away basis

Game No	Fixture date	Home team	Score	Away team	Venue	agg	Att	Rec	Notes	Ref
1	Sat 1 Sep 1951	Dewsbury	15–10	Halifax	Crown Flatt					
2	Sat 1 Sep 1951	Hull Kingston Rovers	19–13	Huddersfield	Craven Park (1)		6,404			
3	Sat 1 Sep 1951	Castleford	14–11	Keighley	Wheldon Road					
4	Sat 1 Sep 1951	Wakefield Trinity	15–5	Hull	Belle Vue					
5	Sat 1 Sep 1951	Doncaster	4–9	Hunslet	York Road Greyhound Stadium				(Note: The first Yorkshire Cup match to be played by newly elected to the league, Doncaster, and also at this stadium)	
6	Sat 1 Sep 1951	Featherstone Rovers	4–2	Bradford Northern	Post Office Road					
7	Sat 1 Sep 1951	Leeds	18–8	Bramley	Headingley					
8	Sat 1 Sep 1951	Batley	7–8	York	Mount Pleasant					

=== Round 1 - Second leg ===
Involved 8 matches (with no byes) and 16 clubs

All first round ties are played on a two-legged home and away basis

Game No	Fixture date	Home team	Score	Away team	Venue	agg	Att	Rec	Notes	Ref
1	Mon 3 Sep 1951	Halifax	9–3	Dewsbury	Thrum Hall	19–18				
2	Mon 3 Sep 1951	Huddersfield	25–5	Hull Kingston Rovers	Fartown	38–24	12,198			
3	Tue 4 Sep 1951	Keighley	9–0	Castleford	Lawkholme Lane	20–14				
4	Wed 5 Sep 1951	Hull	18–18	Wakefield Trinity	Boulevard	23–33				
5	Wed 5 Sep 1951	Hunslet	12–2	Doncaster	Parkside	21–6				
6	Mon 10 Sep 1951	Bradford Northern	11–9	Featherstone Rovers	Odsal	13–13				
7	Mon 10 Sep 1951	Bramley	9–25	Leeds	Barley Mow	17–43				
8	Mon 10 Sep 1951	York	5–21	Batley	Clarence Street	13–28				

=== Round 1 - Replay ===
Involved 1 match and 2 clubs

Game No	Fixture date	Home team	Score	Away team	Venue	agg	Att	Rec	Notes	Ref
R	Wed 12 Sep 1951	Featherstone Rovers	9–17	Bradford Northern	Post Office Road					

=== Round 2 - quarterfinals ===
Involved 4 matches and 8 clubs

All second round ties are played on a knock-out basis

Game No	Fixture date	Home team	Score	Away team	Venue	agg	Att	Rec	Notes	Ref
1	Mon 24 Sep 1951	Hunslet	27–8	Batley	Parkside					
2	Tue 25 Sep 1951	Keighley	18–14	Halifax	Lawkholme Lane					
3	Wed 26 Sep 1951	Bradford Northern	13–14	Leeds	Odsal					
4	Wed 26 Sep 1951	Wakefield Trinity	14–5	Huddersfield	Belle Vue		15,400			

=== Round 3 – semifinals ===
Involved 2 matches and 4 clubs

Both semi-final ties are played on a knock-out basis

Game No	Fixture date	Home team	Score	Away team	Venue	agg	Att	Rec	Notes	Ref
1	Mon 8 Oct 1951	Leeds	17–18	Wakefield Trinity	Headingley					
2	Tue 16 Oct 1951	Keighley	15–9	Hunslet	Lawkholme Lane					

=== Final ===
This was Keighley's only appearance in a Yorkshire Cup final (except for the 1943 Wartime final). Wakefield Trinity won the trophy by beating Keighley by the score of 17-3. The match was played at Fartown, Huddersfield, now in West Yorkshire. The attendance was 25,495 and receipts were £3,347

Game No	Fixture date	Home team	Score	Away team	Venue	agg	Att	Rec	Notes	Ref
	Saturday 27 October 1951	Wakefield Trinity	17–3	Keighley	Fartown		25,495	£3,347	(Note: The receipts are given as £3,237 by the official Huddersfield 1952 Yearbook but given as £3,227 by "100 Years of Rugby. The History of Wakefield Trinity 1873-1973" and £3,347 by RUGBYLEAGUEproject and by the Rothmans Rugby League Yearbook of 1991-92 and 1990-91) (Note: Fartown was the home ground of Huddersfield from 1878 to the end of the 1991-92 season to Huddersfield Town FC's Leeds Road stadium, and then to the McAlpine Stadium in 1994. Fartown remained as a sports/Rugby League ground but is now rather dilapidated, and is only used for staging amateur rugby league games. Due to lack of maintenance, terrace closures and finally major storm damage closing one of the stands in 1986, the final ground capacity had been reduced to just a few thousands although the record attendance was set in a Challenge cup semi-final on 19 April 1947 when a crowd of 35,136 saw Leeds beat Wakefield Trinity 21-0)	

==== Teams and scorers ====
Wakefield Trinity	№	Keighley
	teams	
Ernest Luckman	1	Gerry Lockwood
Johnny Duggan	2	Len Ward
Les Hirst	3	Taylor
Don Froggett	4	Martin Creeney
Denis "Dinny" Boocker	5	Bill Ivill
Glyn Meredith	6	Eric Redman
Arthur Fletcher	7	Fred Barrett
Jack Booth	8	Chris Brereton
Dennis Horner	9	Joe Britton
Bill Hudson	10	J. Ramsden
Derek Howes	11	A. Mulhall
Don Robinson	12	Bob Kelly
Reg Hughes	13	Sanderson
James Croston (standing in for Harry Beverley)	Coach	??
17	score	3
5	HT	3
	Scorers	
	Tries	
Don Robinson (1)	T	Eric Redman (1)
Denis "Dinny" Boocker (1)	T	
Reg Hughes (1)	T	
	Goals	
Les Hirst (4)	G	
Referee		F. Smith (Barrow)

Scoring - Try = three (3) points - Goal = two (2) points - Drop goal = two (2) points

=== The road to success ===
All the ties in the first round were played on a two leg (home and away) basis.

For the first round ties, the first club named in each of the ties played the first leg at home.

For the first round ties, the scores shown are the aggregate score over the two legs.

First round
Featherstone Rovers	22
Bradford Northern	30
Leeds	43
Bramley	17
Wakefield Trinity	33
Hull	23
Hull Kingston Rovers	24
Huddersfield	38
Castleford	14
Keighley	20
Dewsbury	18
Halifax	19
Doncaster	6
Hunslet	21
Batley	28
York	13

Second round
Bradford Northern	13
Leeds	14
Wakefield Trinity	14
Huddersfield	5
Keighley	18
Halifax	14
Hunslet	27
Batley	8

Semifinals
Leeds	17
Wakefield Trinity	18
Keighley	15
Hunslet	9

Final
Wakefield Trinity	17
Keighley	3

== See also ==
- 1951–52 Northern Rugby Football League season
- Rugby league county cups
- Keighley RLFC (post war)
