= Jack Broome (rugby league) =

England international rugby league footballer

Personal information
- Full name: John Broome
- Born: 30 June 1930 Widnes, England
- Died: 28 November 2013 (aged 83)

Playing information
- Position: Fullback, Wing, Centre, Stand-off
Club
Years	Team	Pld	T	G	FG	P
1949–56	Wigan	215	59	0	0	177
1956–59	Widnes	110	17	0	0	51
	Total	325	76	0	0	228
Representative
Years	Team	Pld	T	G	FG	P
1950	England	2	3	0	0	9
1950–56	Lancashire	6
1952	British Empire XIII	1

Coaching information
Club
Years	Team	Gms	W	D	L	W%
197?–7?	Huyton

John "Jack" Broome (30 June 1930 – 28 November 2013) is an English former professional rugby league footballer who played in the 1940s and 1950s. He played at representative level for England and British Empire XIII, and at club level for Wigan and Widnes, as a fullback, wing, centre, or stand-off.

== Playing career ==
=== Championship final appearances ===
Broome played at centre and scored a try in Wigan's 20-2 victory over Huddersfield in the Championship Final during the 1949–50 season at Maine Road, Manchester on Saturday 13 May 1950, and in Wigan's 13-6 victory over Dewsbury in the Championship Final during the 1951–52 season at Leeds Road, Huddersfield on Saturday 10 May 1952.

=== County League appearances ===
Broome played in Wigan's victories in the Lancashire League during the 1949–50 season and 1951–52 season.

=== Challenge Cup Final appearances ===
Broome played at centre in Wigan's 10-0 victory over Barrow in the 1950–51 Challenge Cup Final during the 1950–51 season at Wembley Stadium, London on Saturday 5 May 1951.

=== County Cup Final appearances ===
Broome played at centre in Wigan's 28-5 victory over Warrington in the 1950–51 Lancashire Cup Final during the 1950–51 season at Station Road, Swinton, on Saturday 4 November 1950, played stand-off and scored a try in Wigan's 14-6 victory over Leigh in the 1951–52 Lancashire Cup Final during the 1951–52 season at Station Road, Swinton, on Saturday 27 October 1951, and played at centre in the 8-16 defeat by St. Helens in the 1953–54 Lancashire Cup Final during the 1953–54 season at Station Road, Swinton on Saturday 24 October 1953.

=== Representative honours ===
Broome won caps for England while at Wigan in 1950 against Wales, and France, and won a cap for British Empire XIII while at Wigan in 1952 against New Zealand.

Broome won caps for Lancashire on six occasions.
