= Dickie Williams =

Former GB & Wales international rugby league footballer

Personal information
- Full name: Richard L. Williams
- Born: 16 March 1925; Mountain Ash, Wales
- Died: 26 March 1997 (aged 72); Leeds, England

Playing information
- Weight: 13 st 0 lb (83 kg)

Rugby union
Club
Years	Team	Pld	T	G	FG	P
	Mountain Ash RFC
1943–44	Bristol RUFC
	Total	0	0	0	0	0

Rugby league
- Position: Stand-off
Club
Years	Team	Pld	T	G	FG	P
1944–53	Leeds	236	69	0	0	207
1953–55	Hunslet	44	5	0	0	15
	Total	280	74	0	0	222
Representative
Years	Team	Pld	T	G	FG	P
1948–54	Great Britain	13	5	0	0	15
1947–53	Wales	13	5	0	0	15

Richard "Dickie" L. Williams (16 March 1925 – 26 March 1997) was a Welsh rugby union, and professional rugby league footballer who played in the 1940s and 1950s. He played club level rugby union (RU) for Mountain Ash RFC and Bristol RUFC, and representative level rugby league (RL) for Great Britain and Wales, and at club level for Leeds and Hunslet, as a stand-off.

== Background ==
Dickie Williams was born in Mountain Ash, Wales, and he died aged 72 in Leeds, West Yorkshire, England.

== Playing career ==
Dickie Williams won 13 caps for Wales (RL) in 1947–1953 while at Leeds, and also won 12 caps for Great Britain (RL) in 1948–1954 while at Leeds.

Dickie Williams also represented Great Britain while at Hunslet between 1952 and 1956 against France (1 non-Test match).
