= Fred Brown (rugby league, born 1926) =

Australian rugby league footballer

Personal information
- Full name: Frederick Richard Brown
- Born: 16 April 1926 Newcastle, New South Wales, Australia
- Died: 3 July 2016 (aged 90) Cessnock, New South Wales, Australia

Playing information
- Position: Prop
Club
Years	Team	Pld	T	G	FG	P
1947–53	Manly-Warringah	106	19	0	0	57
Representative
Years	Team	Pld	T	G	FG	P
1955	New South Wales	1	0	0	0	0
1954–58	NSW Country	3	0	0	0	0
1952	NSW City	1	0	0	0	0
- Source: As of 28 March 2019

Fred Brown (1926–2016) was an Australian professional rugby league footballer who played in the 1940s and 1950s. He played for Manly-Warringah in the NSWRL competition.

== Background ==
Brown was born in Newcastle, New South Wales and played junior rugby league in the local country competition before signing with Manly-Warringah.

== Playing career ==
Brown made his first grade debut for Manly-Warringah in 1948. Between 1948 and 1950, Manly struggled towards the bottom of the table narrowly avoiding the wooden spoon on each occasion.

In 1951, Manly finished second on the table and reached their first finals campaign. Manly went on to reach the 1951 NSWRL grand final against South Sydney. Brown played at prop as Souths comprehensively beat Manly 42–14 in the final which was played at the Sydney Sports Ground. At the time this was the highest scoring grand final since 1908.

In 1952, Brown was selected to play for New South Wales City. Brown played with Manly until the end of 1953 before departing the club. In 1954, Brown joined the Maitland Pumpkin Pickers as captain coach. In 1955, Brown was selected to play for New South Wales against Queensland. Brown led Maitland to 3 premierships in a row between 1956 and 1958 in the country competition. Brown also represented NSW Country 4 times between 1954 and 1958.

== Post playing ==
Brown became a police officer with the NSW Police force and worked with youth for more than a decade as the officer of Maitland PCYC. He later left the force where he had a coaching role with the Cessnock Goannas.
