= Tom Froggett =

English cricketer (born 1988)

Personal information
- Full name: Thomas Joseph Froggett
- Born: 5 May 1988 (age 38); Wakefield, Yorkshire, England
- Height: 5 ft 11 in (1.80 m)
- Batting: Right-handed
- Role: Wicket-keeper

Domestic team information
- Years: Team
- 2007–2008: Oxford University

Career statistics
Competition	First-class
Matches	2
Runs scored	46
Batting average	46.00
100s/50s	–/–
Top score	21*
Catches/stumpings	3/1
- Source: Cricinfo, 3 March 2020

Thomas Joseph Froggett (born 5 May 1988) is an English former first-class cricketer.

Froggett was born at Wakefield in May 1988. He later studied at St John's College, Oxford where he played first-class cricket for Oxford University. He made two first-class appearances for Oxford, playing in The University Matches of 2007 and 2008 against Cambridge University. Playing as a wicket-keeper, he scored 46 runs with a high score of 21 not out, in addition to taking three catches and making a single stumping in his capacity as wicket-keeper.
