= Geoff Gunney =

English RL coach and former GB international rugby league footballer

Geoff Gunney MBE
Personal information
- Full name: Geoffrey Gunney
- Born: 9 November 1933 Leeds, West Riding of Yorkshire, England
- Died: 6 June 2018 (aged 84)

Playing information
- Position: Second-row
Club
Years	Team	Pld	T	G	FG	P
1951–73	Hunslet	580	125	75	0	525
Representative
Years	Team	Pld	T	G	FG	P
1954–65	Great Britain	11	2	0	0	6
1955–61	Yorkshire	9	6	0	0	18

Coaching information
Club
Years	Team	Gms	W	D	L	W%
1971–73	Hunslet
1976	Wakefield Trinity
	Total	0	0	0	0

Geoffrey Gunney MBE (9 November 1933 – 7 June 2018), also known by the nickname of "Mr. Hunslet", was an English professional rugby league footballer who played in the 1950s, 1960s and 1970s, and coached in the 1970s. He played at representative level for Great Britain and Yorkshire, and at club level for Hunslet, as a second-row. Gunney then coached at club level for Wakefield Trinity.

== Biography ==
Gunney was born in Armley, a suburb in the west of Leeds, West Riding of Yorkshire, his birth was birth registered in Leeds South district, he was a pupil at Dewsbury Road School, Hunslet.

=== Playing career ===
Gunney made his début for Hunslet in 1951. He would go on to spend his entire playing career with Hunslet. Gunney represented the Rest of the World in the 11–20 defeat by Australia at Sydney Cricket Ground on 29 June 1957. He represented Great Britain & France in the 37–31 victory over New Zealand at Carlaw Park, Auckland on 3 July 1957. Gunney played left-second-row for English League XIII while at Hunslet in the 8–26 defeat by France on Saturday 22 November 1958 at Knowsley Road, St. Helens. Gunney's Testimonial match at Hunslet took place in 1960.

Gunney won caps for Great Britain while at Hunslet in 1954 against New Zealand (3 matches), in 1956 against Australia, in 1957 against France (3 matches), in the 1957 Rugby League World Cup against France, and New Zealand, in 1964 against France, in 1965 against France. Gunney played right-second-row in Hunslet's 16–20 defeat by Wigan in the 1965 Challenge Cup Final at Wembley Stadium, London on Saturday 8 May 1965, in front of a crowd of 89,016. Gunney played right-second-row in Hunslet's 8–17 defeat by Bradford Northern in the 1965 Yorkshire Cup Final at Headingley, Leeds on Saturday 16 October 1965.

For the 1970 Birthday Honours Gunney was appointed a Member of the Order of the British Empire (MBE) for services to rugby league football. He had made 579 appearances for Hunslet at the time of his retirement in 1973.

=== Coaching career ===
Gunney took on the role of player-coach at Hunslet in 1971. Gunney was appointed as coach at Wakefield Trinity in August 1976, he was replaced by Brian Lockwood 3-months later in November 1976.
