= Vince Soorley =

Australian rugby league footballer (1923-2010

Personal information
- Full name: John Vincent Soorley
- Born: 1923 Tweed Heads, New South Wales
- Died: 8 March 2010 (aged 86–87) Tweed Heads, New South Wales

Playing information
- Weight: 14 st 0 lb (89 kg)
- Position: Second-row
Club
Years	Team	Pld	T	G	FG	P
1947–48	St. George	27	1	0	0	3
1950	Eastern Suburbs	16	0	0	0	0
	Total	43	1	0	0	3

Vince Soorley (1923-2010) was an Australian rugby league footballer who played in the 1940s.

== Playing career ==
A Tweed Heads, New South Wales product, Vince Soorley attracted the attention of St. George officials when he played against the club's touring team in 1946. Soorley also represented the Far North Coast against the English touring team at Grafton on 16 July 1946.

Soorley was a banana farmer and a friend of the St. George lock forward, Walter Mussing.

After spending two seasons at St George, Soorley took up a captain/coach position at the Alpha rugby league club in Central Queensland in 1949. He returned to Sydney in 1950 and played a final season at the Eastern Suburbs club before finishing his career in Warwick and Toowoomba.

== Death ==
Soorley died on 8 March 2010 aged 87.
