= Doug Cameron (rugby league) =

Australian rugby league footballer

Doug Cameron (Australia) was a rugby league footballer in the New South Wales Rugby League competition.

A halfback, Cameron played for the Eastern Suburbs club in late 1950s before finishing his league career at Young, playing for the 'Cherry Pickers' in rural New South Wales.

Cameron was also a representative of NSW during his career.
