= Jim Bowden (rugby league) =

GB & England international rugby league footballer

Personal information
- Full name: James Bowden
- Born: unknown
- Died: c. 2003

Playing information
- Position: Centre, Prop
Club
Years	Team	Pld	T	G	FG	P
1949–57	Huddersfield
Representative
Years	Team	Pld	T	G	FG	P
1950–54	Yorkshire	4	0	0	0	0
1953	England	1	0	0	0	0
1954	Great Britain	4	0	0	0	0

James Bowden (birth unknown – c. 2003) was a professional rugby league footballer who played in the 1950s. He played at representative level for Great Britain, England and Yorkshire, and at club level for Huddersfield, as a centre, or prop, and was a director of Bramley.

== Playing career ==
=== Club career ===
Bowden played, and scored 5-goals in Huddersfield's 16–3 victory over Castleford in the 1950 Yorkshire Cup Final during the 1950–51 season at Headingley, Leeds on Saturday 4 November 1950.

Bowden played right-prop in Huddersfield's 15–10 victory over St. Helens in the 1953 Challenge Cup Final during the 1952-53 season at Wembley Stadium, London on Saturday 25 April 1953, in front of a crowd of 89,588.

He retired from rugby league in 1957 to focus on his career as a dentist.

=== International honours ===
Jim Bowden won a cap for England while at Huddersfield in 1953 against France, and won caps for Great Britain while at Huddersfield in 1954 against Australia (2 matches), and New Zealand.

Jim Bowden also represented Great Britain while at Huddersfield between 1952 and 1956 against France (1 non-Test match).

== Contemporaneous Article Extract ==
"Won Yorkshire Rugby Union schoolboy honours while at Giggleswick School, and played for his county in Rugby League Football as a centre. Huddersfield have switched him to the pack, where he is following in father's (a Bramley forward) footsteps."

== Outside of Rugby League ==
Jim Bowden worked for many years as a dentist in Wakefield.

== Personal life ==
Jim Bowden's father was a rugby league forward for Bramley.
