= Ross Kite =

Australia international rugby league footballer

Personal information
- Full name: Ross Ernest Kite
- Born: 24 October 1930; Sydney, New South Wales, Australia
- Died: 30 May 2004 (aged 73); Sydney, New South Wales, Australia

Playing information
- Position: Wing
Club
Years	Team	Pld	T	G	FG	P
1952–57	St George Dragons	87	49	49	0	245
1958	Wagga Wagga
1959–61	Canterbury-Bankstown	42	11	3	0	39
	Total	129	60	52	0	284
Representative
Years	Team	Pld	T	G	FG	P
1954–58	New South Wales	14	19	0	0	57
1956–57	Australia	5	3	0	0	9
1956	NSW City	1	1	0	0	3
1958	NSW Country	1	1	0	0	3

Ross Ernest Kite (1930–2004) was an Australian rugby league footballer who played in the 1950s. He was a premiership winning goal-kicking, winger with the St George Dragons, made state representative appearances and played in Test matches for the Australian national side.

== Club career ==
Kite began his football career playing for Arncliffe Scots in the St. George Juniors as a centre, but it was his move to wing that initiated his playing career. He played six seasons for the St George Dragons between 1952–1957. He played in two Grand Finals during this time, losing in 1953 and winning a premiership in season 1956.

Kite moved to Wagga Wagga in 1958 for one season in Group 9 before returning to Sydney football in 1959 for Canterbury-Bankstown where he stayed until he retired at the end of the 1961 NSWRFL season.

== Representative career ==
Kite's representative career began in 1954 when he was selected to play for New South Wales, in which he scored four tries in his debut match. He played for the Blues on eight occasions during his career in 1954, 1955, 1956 and 1958 and scored 14 tries during these appearances. In 1955 Kite made his debut at international level, when he was selected for Australian in all three Test matches against the touring French team. He made two more Test appearances in 1958 when he was selected to play against the touring English team. Ross Kite is listed on the Australian Players Register as Kangaroo No. 316.

== Death ==
Kite died on 30 May 2004, age 73.
