= 1951–1952 New Zealand rugby league tour of Great Britain and France =

The 1951–1952 Kiwi tour of Great Britain and France was a rugby league tour of Great Britain and France by the New Zealand national rugby league team.

== Great Britain tests ==
- 6 October 1951: Great Britain 21–15 New Zealand, Bradford
- 10 November 1951: Great Britain 20–19 New Zealand, Swinton
- 15 December 1951: Great Britain 16–12 New Zealand, Leeds

== Wales test match ==
- 7 December 1951: Wales 3–15 New Zealand, Bradford

== France tests ==
- 23 December 1951: France 8–3 New Zealand, Paris
- 30 December 1951: France 17–7 New Zealand, Bordeaux

== British Empire XIII match ==
The final match of the tour was against a Great Britain and Australia combined team labelled the "British Empire XIII". The match was played on 23 January 1952 at Stamford Bridge, London. The British Empire team won 26–2 in front of a crowd of around 6,000. The match, not originally planned for the tour, was arranged because the New Zealand team wanted to play a match in London.

=== Teams ===
British Empire XIII

1. (United Kingdom) Jack Cunliffe
2. (Australia) Brian Bevan
3. (Australia) Trevor Allan
4. (Australia) Ernest Ward
5. (Australia) Lionel Cooper
6. (United Kingdom) Jack Broome
7. (United Kingdom) Albert Pepperell
8. (United Kingdom) Tom McKinney
9. (United Kingdom) Frank Barton
10. (United Kingdom) Alan Prescott
11. (Australia) Harry Bath
12. (Australia) Arthur Clues
13. (United Kingdom) Dave Valentine
