= Jack Cunliffe =

Great Britain and England international rugby league footballer

Personal information
- Full name: John Cunliffe
- Born: 3 March 1921; Wigan, England
- Died: 5 February 1973 (aged 51); Wigan, England

Playing information
- Position: Fullback, Wing, Centre, Stand-off, Scrum-half
Club
Years	Team	Pld	T	G	FG	P
1939–60	Wigan	441	84	364		981
Representative
Years	Team	Pld	T	G	FG	P
1942–52	Lancashire	7	1	3	0	9
1949–56	England	7	1	0	0	3
1950–54	Great Britain	4	0	0	0	0

Jack Cunliffe (3 March 1921 – 5 February 1973) was an English professional rugby league footballer who played in the 1930s, 1940s, 1950s and 1960s. He played at representative level for Great Britain and England as a utility Back, e.g. fullback, wing, centre, stand-off or scrum-half. Jack Cunliffe played for Wigan in four decades; he made his début for Wigan on Saturday 9 December 1939, and he played his last match for Wigan on Saturday 9 January 1960 (a record that is unlikely to be equaled within rugby league).

== Playing career ==
=== International honours ===
Jack Cunliffe won caps for England while at Wigan in 1949 against France, in 1950 against France (2 matches), and Wales, in 1951 against Other Nationalities, and Wales, in 1956 against France, won caps for British Empire XIII while at Wigan in 1952 against New Zealand, and won caps for Great Britain while at Wigan in 1950 against Australia and New Zealand, in 1951 against New Zealand, in 1954 against Australia.

=== Championship final appearances ===
Jack Cunliffe played in Wigan's victories in the Championship Finals during the 1945-46 season, 1946–47 season, 1949–50 season, 1951–52 season and 1959–60 season.

=== Challenge Cup Final appearances ===
Jack Cunliffe played in Wigan's 12-13 defeat by Wakefield Trinity in the 1945–46 Challenge Cup Final during the 1945–46 season at Wembley Stadium, London, played fullback in the 10-0 victory over Barrow in the 1950–51 Challenge Cup Final during the 1950-51 season Wembley Stadium, London on Saturday 5 May 1951, and played fullback, and scored 2-goals in the 13-9 victory over Workington Town in the 1957–58 Challenge Cup Final during the 1957–58 season Wembley Stadium, London on Saturday 10 May 1958.

=== County League appearances ===
Jack Cunliffe played in Wigan's victories in the Lancashire League during the 1945–46 season, 1946–47 season, 1949–50 season, 1951–52 season and 1958–59 season.

=== County Cup Final appearances ===
Jack Cunliffe played right-centre in Wigan's 20-7 victory over Leigh in the 1949–50 Lancashire Cup Final during the 1949–50 season at Wilderspool Stadium on Saturday 29 October 1949, played fullback, and scored a try in the 28-5 victory over Warrington in the 1950–51 Lancashire Cup Final during the 1950–51 season at Station Road, Swinton on Saturday 4 November 1950, played fullback in the 14-6 victory over Leigh in the 1951–52 Lancashire Cup Final during the 1951–52 season at Station Road, Swinton on Saturday 27 October 1951, played fullback in the 8-16 defeat by St. Helens in the 1953–54 Lancashire Cup Final during the 1953–54 season at Station Road, Swinton on Saturday 24 October 1953, and played fullback, and scored a goal in the 8-13 defeat by Oldham in the 1957–58 Lancashire CupFinal during the 1957–58 season at Station Road, Swinton on Saturday 19 October 1957.
