= Jim Evans (rugby league) =

Australian rugby league footballer

Personal information
- Full name: James Phillip Evans
- Born: 12 December 1929 Sydney, New South Wales, Australia
- Died: 13 August 2013 (aged 83) Kiama, New South Wales, Australia

Playing information
- Position: Prop
Club
Years	Team	Pld	T	G	FG	P
1948	South Sydney	1	0	0	0	0
1952–56	Newtown	56	0	0	0	0
	Total	57	0	0	0	0
Representative
Years	Team	Pld	T	G	FG	P
1954	New South Wales	3	0	0	0	0
1954	NSW City	1	0	0	0	0
1951	NSW Country	1	0	0	0	0

James Phillip Evans (12 December 1929 – 13 August 2013) was an Australian rugby league footballer who played in the 1940s and 1950s. He played for Newtown and South Sydney in the New South Wales Rugby League (NSWRL) competition.

== Playing career ==
Evans made his first grade debut for South Sydney in 1948 making only one appearance. In 1949 to 1951, Evans played in the Newcastle competition for the Maitland club. He played for Newcastle against the touring French team and represented NSW Country.

In 1952, Evans joined Newtown but his first 2 seasons there ended with the club missing out on the finals. In 1954, Evans became captain of the team as Newtown won the minor premiership.

Evans played captained Newtown and played at prop in the 1954 NSWRL grand final against South Sydney which Newtown lost 23–15. Evans also represented New South Wales and New South Wales City in 1954.

The following year, Newtown again claimed the minor premiership and reached the 1955 NSWRL grand final against Souths but Evans missed out on playing in the finals series and the grand final. Newtown went into the game as favorites as South Sydney were without a few of their star players including future immortal Clive Churchill. Newtown led at halftime 8-4 before Souths came back to win a thrilling contest 12–11. This would be Newtown's last grand final appearance for another 26 years.

Evans played one further season for Newtown. He had joined the New South Wales Police Force and was transferred to Bowraville in 1957. He played 4 seasons with the Tigers and won a number of premierships. He retired in 1961. His police career continued and he moved to Catherine Hill Bay. He was involved in the formation of the Swansea Rugby League football club and became a life member. He moved again to Jindabyne in 1968. He briefly made a one match comeback for Jindabyne against Delegate.

Evans moved with his wife to Kiama, New South Wales. He died in August 2013, aged 84.
