= Don Evenden =

Australian rugby league footballer

Personal information
- Full name: Donald Kelvin Evenden
- Born: 1931
- Died: 8 November 2018 (Age 87); Taree, New South Wales, Australia

Playing information
- Position: Prop
Club
Years	Team	Pld	T	G	FG	P
1952–58	North Sydney	123	22	0	0	66
1959–60	Balmain	10	1	0	0	3
	Total	133	23	0	0	69
Representative
Years	Team	Pld	T	G	FG	P
1954–57	New South Wales	2	0	0	0	0

Don Evenden (1931-2018) was an Australian rugby league footballer who played in the 1950s and 1960s. He played in the NSWRFL premiership for North Sydney and Balmain as a prop.

== Playing career ==
Evenden began his first grade career with North Sydney in 1952 and was a member of the Norths sides which reached the preliminary finals in 1952 and 1953 but fell short of a grand final appearance. In 1954, Evenden was selected to play for New South Wales and Australia but failed to make an appearance for the Australian side as he was an unused reserve in the third test against Great Britain. In 1957, Evenden was selected to play for New South Wales again as they defeated Queensland 69–5 in an interstate series match. In 1959, Evenden joined Balmain and spent two seasons with them making a total of 10 appearances.
