= Drew Turnbull =

GB international rugby league footballer

Personal information
- Full name: Andrew Turnbull
- Born: c. 1930
- Died: 20 June 2012 (aged 80–81)

Playing information

Rugby union
- Position: Wing
Club
Years	Team	Pld	T	G	FG	P
≤1948–48	Hawick RFC

Rugby league
- Position: Wing
Club
Years	Team	Pld	T	G	FG	P
1948–56	Leeds	230	228
1956–≥56	Halifax
	Total	230	228	0	0	0
Representative
Years	Team	Pld	T	G	FG	P
1951	Great Britain	1	2	0	0	6

Andrew Turnbull (c. 1930 – 20 June 2012) was a Scottish rugby union and professional rugby league footballer who played in the 1940s and 1950s. He played club level rugby union (RU) for Hawick RFC, and representative level rugby league (RL) for Great Britain, and at club level for Leeds and Halifax, as a wing. Drew Turnbull served with the Duke of Wellington's Regiment.

== Playing career ==
=== International honours ===
Turnbull won a cap for Great Britain (RL) while at Leeds in 1951 against New Zealand.

Turnbull also represented Great Britain (RL) while at Leeds between 1952 and 1956 against France (1 non-Test match).

Turnbull was selected to face Australia on the 1952–53 Kangaroo tour of Great Britain and France but had to withdraw due to injury, and played in two non-Test matches in the 1954 Great Britain Lions Tour of Australia and New Zealand, before having to return prematurely due to injury.

=== County League appearances ===
Turnbull played in Leeds' victories in the Yorkshire League during the 1950–51 season and 1954–55 season.

=== Club career ===
Turnbull made his début, and scored a try for Leeds on Saturday 21 August 1948 against Bramley at Headingley, and he played his last match for Leeds against Castleford at Headingley Stadium on Saturday 18 February 1956.

=== Career records ===
With 228 tries, Turnbull is fourth on Leeds' all-time list of try scorers. Only Eric Harris, who did it three times, has bettered Turnbull's 41 tries in a league season for Leeds, set in 1954–55. Along with Fred Webster and Eric Harris, Turnbull was one of only three players to have scored six or more tries in a game for the club, achieving a double hat-trick against Batley on Monday 28 December 1953.

== Note ==
References variously spell Turnbull's surname correctly as Turnbull, or incorrectly as Turnball.
