= Nat Silcock Jr. =

English rugby league coach (1927–1992)

Nat Silcock
Personal information
- Full name: Nathan Douglas Silcock
- Born: 25 November 1927 Widnes, England
- Died: 27 July 1992 (aged 64) Penketh, England

Playing information
- Height: 6 ft 1 in (1.85 m)
- Weight: 16 st 0 lb (102 kg)
- Position: Wing, Prop, Second-row
Club
Years	Team	Pld	T	G	FG	P
1947–54	Wigan	196	67			201
1955–58	St Helens	138	29			87
1958–61	Warrington	111	11	0	0	33
1961–64	South Newcastle
1964	Easts (Sydney)	13	0	0	0	0
	Total	458	107	0	0	321
Representative
Years	Team	Pld	T	G	FG	P
19??–??	Lancashire	7
19??–??	Rugby League XIII	1
1951–53	England	3	3	0	0	9
1954	Great Britain	3	1	0	0	3
1961–64	Newcastle (Aust.)	3	1	0	0	3

Coaching information
Club
Years	Team	Gms	W	D	L	W%
1961–64	South Newcastle
1964	Eastern Suburbs
	Total	0	0	0	0
- Father: Nat Silcock Sr.

Nathan "Nat" Douglas Silcock (25 November 1927 – 27 July 1992) was an English professional rugby league footballer who played in the 1940s, 1950s and 1960s, and coached in the 1960s. He played at representative level for Great Britain, England, Rugby League XIII, Lancashire, and Australia’s Newcastle team, and at club level for Wigan, St. Helens, Warrington, South Newcastle and Eastern Suburbs, as a wing, prop, or second-row, and coached at club level for South Newcastle and Eastern Suburbs.

== Background ==
Nat Silcock was born in Widnes, Lancashire, England. H was the son of rugby league player Nat Silcock Sr. and would die aged 64 in Penketh, Lancashire, England.

== Playing career ==
=== England ===
==== Wigan ====
Silcock played second-row in Wigan’s 16–11 victory over Australia at Central Park, Wigan on Wednesday 20 October 1948. Silcock played second-row in Wigan’s 14–8 victory over Warrington in the 1948–49 Lancashire Cup Final during the 1948–49 season at Station Road, Swinton on Saturday 13 November 1948. Silcock played wing, and scored a try in Wigan’s 20–2 victory over Huddersfield in the Championship Final during the 1949–50 season at Maine Road, Manchester on Saturday 13 May 1950.

Silcock played wing, and scored three tries in the 49–28 victory over Italy at Central Park, Wigan on Saturday 26 August 1950. He played at second-row in the 28–5 victory over Warrington in the 1950–51 Lancashire Cup Final during the 1950–51 season at Station Road, Swinton on Saturday 4 November 1950. Silcock played in Wigan’s victories in the Lancashire League during the 1949–50 season and 1951–52 season. Silcock played at second-row in Wigan’s 10–0 victory over Barrow in the 1950–51 Challenge Cup Final during the 1950–51 season at Wembley Stadium, London on Saturday 5 May 1951. He played second-row in the 14–6 victory over Leigh in the 1951–52 Lancashire Cup Final during the 1951–52 season at Station Road, Swinton on Saturday 27 October 1951. Silcock was also selected to play for England in 1951 against Other Nationalities. He also played second-row, and scored a try in the 13–6 victory over Bradford Northern in the Championship Final during the 1951–52 season at Leeds Road, Huddersfield on Saturday 10 May 1952. Silcock was selected to play for England in 1952 against Other Nationalities.

Silcock was selected to play for England while in 1953 against Wales. Silcock played at prop in Wigan’s 8–16 defeat by St. Helens in the 1953–54 Lancashire Cup Final during the 1953–54 season at Station Road, Swinton on Saturday 24 October 1953. He also won caps for Great Britain in 1954 against Australia (3 matches).

==== St Helens ====
Silcock played at prop in St. Helens' 13–2 victory over Halifax in the 1956 Challenge Cup Final during the 1955–56 season at Wembley Stadium, London on Saturday 28 April 1956, in front of a crowd of 79,341, and played at prop in the 3–10 defeat by Oldham in the 1956–57 Lancashire Cup Final during the 1956–57 season at Central Park, Wigan on Saturday 20 October 1956, in front of a crowd of 39,544.

==== Warrington ====
Silcock played for Warrington from September 1958 to April 1961. Silcock played prop in Warrington’s 5–4 victory over St. Helens in the 1959–60 Lancashire Cup Final during the 1959–60 season at Central Park, Wigan on Saturday 31 October 1959, in front of a crowd of 39,237.

=== Australia ===
==== Newcastle ====
Silcock travelled to Australia to play in the Newcastle Rugby League for the South Newcastle club from 1961 to 1964. In 2010 Silcock was named in a South Newcastle team of the century.

==== Sydney ====
Silcock moved to Sydney’s New South Wales Rugby Football League to captain-coach Eastern Suburbs for the 1964 season. Silcock originally applied for the position of captain-coach at South Sydney, but was beaten by Bernie Purcell, and beat out Jack Hampstead and fellow Englishman Bert Holcroft for the Easts coaching position. Easts had finished last with only three wins in 1963, but although they surrendered the wooden spoon to Canterbury-Bankstown in 1964, did even worse in their one season under Silcock, winning only two games, and it was clear before the season closed that Silcock would not be reappointed.
