= Neville Gosson =

Australian rugby league footballer

Personal information
- Full name: Neville Edward Gosson
- Born: 1927 Kogarah, New South Wales, Australia
- Died: 7 July 2016 (aged 88–89) Buderim, Queensland, Australia

Playing information
- Position: Hooker
Club
Years	Team	Pld	T	G	FG	P
1951	St. George	9	1	0	0	3
1955	Eastern Suburbs	15	1	0	0	3
	Total	24	2	0	0	6

Neville Gosson (1927–2016) was an Australian professional rugby league footballer who played in the 1950s.

A hooker, Gosson was a St. George junior, who was elevated to first grade for the 1951 season. The arrival of Ken Kearney to St George in 1952 ended his career at the club, although he continued his career at Canowindra Rugby League Club as a contracted player-coach for the 1952 season. He returned to Sydney and joined Eastern Suburbs, and played a full season in first grade with them in 1955 before retiring from rugby league.

Gosson later found fame as a round-the-world yachtsman holding at one time the record for the most consecutive days under sail.

In 2015 he was recognised for 50 years membership of the Cruising Yacht Club of Australia (Sydney). He died in 2016.
