= Gerry Lowe (rugby league, born 1931) =

Australian rugby league footballer (1931–2012)

Gerald Lowe
Personal information
- Full name: Gerald Arthur Lowe
- Born: 1931
- Died: 15 April 2012

Playing information
- Position: Centre, Five-eighth
Club
| Years | Team | Pld | T | G | FG | P |
|---|---|---|---|---|---|---|
| 1952 | Western Suburbs | 20 | 2 | 0 | 0 | 6 |

Gerald Arthur Lowe (1931 – 15 April 2012) was an Australian rugby league footballer.

A product of Tamworth rugby league, Lowe spent the 1952 NSWRFL season with the Western Suburbs Magpies, having been recommended by former player Vic Williams. He appeared occasionally as a five–eighth, but was utilised mainly as a centre, including for their grand final win over South Sydney. In 1953, Lowe returned home to Tamworth. He was in talks to play again for Western Suburbs in 1954, but instead opted to join Cowra.

Lowe had a brother Bobby who briefly played first–grade for the Magpies.
