= Norm Pope (rugby league, born 1931) =

Australian rugby league player

Personal information
- Born: 10 September 1931
- Died: 2 March 2003 (aged 71)

Playing information
- Position: Fullback
Representative
Years	Team	Pld	T	G	FG	P
1953–56	Queensland	13	0	51	0	102
1956	Australia	1	0	5	0	10

Norm Pope (10 September 1931 – 2 March 2003) was an Australian rugby league player.

A Balmain junior, Pope was a prolific goal-kicking fullback for Valleys and spent his entire first-grade career in Brisbane from 1950 to 1964, aside from one season with Rockhampton's Railways club. He broke a Brisbane Rugby League (BRL) goal-kicking record in 1953 when he slotted 19 goals from 22 attempts in a rout of Wynnum Manly. In 1956, Pope represented Australia in the 3rd Test against New Zealand at the Sydney Cricket Ground, kicking five goals in a 31–14 win. He set another BRL record in 1957 by amassing 330-points for the season.

Pope served as coach of both Valleys and Wests.

In 2022, Pope was named fullback in the Brisbane Rugby League Team of the Century, put together by the BRL and QRL history committee to commemorate the 100th anniversary of the competition.
