= 1951–52 Northern Rugby Football League season =

- League: Northern Rugby League

1951–52 Season
- Champions: Wigan
- League Leaders: Bradford Northern
- Top point-scorer: Willie Horne 313
- Top try-scorer: Lionel Cooper 71

The 1951–52 Rugby Football League season was the 57th season of rugby league football.

== Season summary ==
Wigan won their eighth Championship when they beat Bradford Northern 13–6 in the play-off final. Bradford had ended the regular season as the league leaders.

The Challenge Cup Winners were Workington Town who beat Featherstone Rovers 18–10 in the final.

Liverpool Stanley was renamed Liverpool City, and Cardiff, and Doncaster joined the league.

Wigan won the Lancashire League, and Huddersfield won the Yorkshire League.

== Championship ==
Final standings

	Team	Pld	W	D	L	Pts
1	Bradford Northern	36	28	1	7	57
2	Wigan	36	27	1	8	55
3	Hull	36	26	1	9	53
4	Huddersfield	36	26	0	10	52
5	Oldham	36	25	1	10	51
6	Warrington	36	24	1	11	49
7	Leigh	36	23	2	11	48
8	Workington Town	36	23	0	13	46
9	Hunslet	36	22	1	13	45
10	Barrow	36	21	2	13	44
11	Doncaster	36	21	1	14	43
12	Widnes	36	20	2	14	42
13	Leeds	36	19	2	15	40
14	Swinton	36	18	3	15	39
15	Salford	36	18	2	16	38
16	Wakefield Trinity	36	19	0	17	38
17	Batley	36	18	1	17	37
18	Dewsbury	36	18	0	18	36
19	Whitehaven	36	16	4	16	36
20	St. Helens	36	16	2	18	34
21	Halifax	36	16	2	18	34
22	Featherstone Rovers	36	14	2	20	30
23	Belle Vue Rangers	36	12	3	21	27
24	York	36	12	3	21	27
25	Hull Kingston Rovers	36	10	1	25	21
26	Rochdale Hornets	36	10	1	25	21
27	Bramley	36	10	1	25	21
28	Castleford	36	8	1	27	17
29	Keighley	36	8	1	27	17
30	Cardiff	36	5	0	31	10
31	Liverpool City	36	4	0	32	8

Play-offs

Source: wigan.rlfans.com.
League points: for win = 2; for draw = 1; for loss = 0.
Pld = Games played; W = Wins; D = Draws; L = Losses; Pts = League points.

=== Play-offs ===
Semi-finals
1	Bradford Northern	18
4	Huddersfield	15
2	Wigan	13
3	Hull	9

Championship final
Bradford Northern	6
Wigan	13

10 May 1952

Wigan	13 – 6	Bradford Northern
Tries: Ryan, Cunliffe, Silcock; Goals: Gee (2)		Goals: Phillips (3)

Leeds Road, Huddersfield
Attendance: 48,684
Referee: C.F. Appleton (Warrington)

Wigan	Number	Bradford Northern
	Teams	
Martin Ryan	1	Joseph Phillips
Jack Hilton	2	Bob Hawes
Jack Broome	3	Joe Mageen
George Roughley	4	Norman Hastings
Brian Nordgren	5	Jack McLean
Jack Cunliffe	6	Len Haley
Johnny Alty	7	Gwylfa Jones
Ken Gee	8	Bill Shreeve
Ronnie Mather	9	Norman Haley
George Woosey	10	Brian Radford
Nat Silcock Jr.	11	Barry Tyler
Jack Large	12	Trevor Foster
Harry Street	13	Ken Traill
Jim Sullivan	Coach	Dai Rees

== Challenge Cup ==
Workington Town beat Featherstone Rovers 18–10 in the Challenge Cup Final played at Wembley Stadium on Saturday 19 April 1952 in front of a crowd of 72,093. Workington full-back and captain-coach Gus Risman became the oldest player to appear in a Cup final at age 41. Three Australians, Tony Paskins, John Mudge and Bevan Wilson came up with decisive plays to help relative newcomers Workington to victory. It was the club's first Cup Final win in their first Final appearance. Billy Ivison, Workington Town's loose forward, was awarded the Lance Todd Trophy for man-of-the-match.

== County cups ==
Wigan beat Leigh 14–6 to win the Lancashire Cup, and Wakefield Trinity beat Keighley 17–3 to win the Yorkshire Cup.

== European Championship ==
This was the twelfth competition and was won for the fourth time by France on points difference.

=== Results ===
19 September

England	35–11	Wales

St. Helens

3 November

Other nationalities	17–14	France

Hull

25 November

France	42–13	England

Marseille

1 December

Other nationalities	22–11	Wales

Abertillery

6 April

France	20–12	Wales

Bordeaux

23 April

England	31–18	Other nationalities

Wigan

=== Final standings ===
Team	Played	Won	Drew	Lost	For	Against	Diff	Points
France	3	2	0	1	76	42	+34	4
England	3	2	0	1	79	71	+8	4
Other nationalities	3	2	0	1	57	56	+1	4
Wales	3	0	0	3	34	77	−43	0

== Sources ==
- 1951-52 Rugby Football League season at wigan.rlfans.com
- The Challenge Cup at The Rugby Football League website
