= 1955–56 Yorkshire Cup =

- Structure: Regional knockout championship
- Teams: 16
- Winners: Halifax
- Runners-up: Hull F.C.

1955–56 was the forty-eighth occasion on which the Yorkshire Cup competition had been held.

This year's final was a repeat of last years' final and between cup holder Halifax and last season runner-up Hull F.C. with the same outcome (albeit via a replay).

Halifax won the trophy by beating Hull F.C. by the score of 10–10 in a replayed final.

The original final, which ended in a 10–10 draw, was played at Headingley, Leeds, now in West Yorkshire. The attendance was 23,520 and receipts were £4,385.

The replay was played 11 days later at Odsal in the City of Bradford, now in West Yorkshire. The attendance was 14,000 and receipts were £2,439.

This was the second of Halifax's two successive victories, both against Hull FC, for whom it was their third successive cup final defeat.

== Background ==
This season there were no junior/amateur clubs taking part, no new entrants and no "leavers" and so the total of entries remained the same at sixteen.

This in turn resulted in no byes in the first round.

This season saw a continuation of the simple knock-out formulas, there was to be no return to the two-legged ties.

== Competition and results ==
=== Round 1 ===
Involved 8 matches (with no byes) and 16 clubs

Game No	Fixture date	Home team	Score	Away team	Venue	Att	Rec	Notes	Ref
1	Sat 27 Aug 1955	Batley	13–25	Hull F.C.	Mount Pleasant				
2	Sat 27 Aug 1955	Bradford Northern	27–23	Hunslet	Odsal				
3	Sat 27 Aug 1955	Bramley	16–13	Doncaster	Barley Mow				
4	Sat 27 Aug 1955	Castleford	29–8	Dewsbury	Wheldon Road				
5	Sat 27 Aug 1955	Featherstone Rovers	26–9	Huddersfield	Post Office Road	9,000			
6	Sat 27 Aug 1955	Hull Kingston Rovers	21–13	Keighley	Craven Park (1)				
7	Sat 27 Aug 1955	Leeds	13–31	Wakefield Trinity	Headingley				
8	Wed 31 Aug 1955	York	5–13	Halifax	Clarence Street				

=== Round 2 - quarterfinals ===
Involved 4 matches and 8 clubs

Game No	Fixture date	Home team	Score	Away team	Venue	Att	Rec	Notes	Ref
1	Mon 5 Sep 1955	Hull F.C.	12–5	Featherstone Rovers	Boulevard				
2	Fri 9 Sep 1955	Bramley	5–12	Bradford Northern	Barley Mow				
3	Wed 14 Sep 1955	Castleford	17–0	Hull Kingston Rovers	Wheldon Road				
4	Thu 15 Sep 1955	Wakefield Trinity	4–21	Halifax	Belle Vue				

=== Round 3 – semifinals ===
Involved 2 matches and 4 clubs

Game No	Fixture date	Home team	Score	Away team	Venue	Att	Rec	Notes	Ref
1	Tue 20 Sep 1955	Hull F.C.	23–16	Bradford Northern	Boulevard				
2	Wed 28 Sep 1955	Castleford	8–24	Halifax	Wheldon Road				

=== Final ===
22 October 1955

Halifax	10 – 10	Hull F.C.
Tries: Bevan, Henderson; Goals: Griffiths (2)		Tries: Bowman, Watts; Goals: Watkinson (2)

Headingley, Leeds
Attendance: 23,520
Referee: G. S. Phillips (Widnes)

Halifax	No.	Hull F.C.
	Teams	
Tuss Griffiths	1	Jack Watkinson
Arthur Daniels	2	Keith Bowman
Tommy Lynch	3	Carl Turner
Geoff Palmer	4	Bill Riches
Dai Bevan	5	Ivor Watts
Ken Dean	6	Rowley Moat
Stan Kielty	7	Tommy Finn
John Thorley	8	Mick Scott (c)
Alvin Ackerley (c)	9	Tommy Harris
Jack Wilkinson	10	Bob Coverdale
Derrick Schofield	11	Harry Markham
John Henderson	12	Bill Drake
Albert Fearnley	13	Johnny Whiteley
??	Coach	Roy Francis

==== Replay ====
2 November 1955

Halifax	7 – 0	Hull F.C.
Tries: Daniels; Goals: Griffiths (2)

Odsal Stadium, Bradford
Attendance: 14,000
Referee: N. T. Railton (Wigan)

Halifax	No.	Hull F.C.
	Teams	
Tuss Griffiths	1	Colin Hutton
Arthur Daniels	2	Keith Bowman
Tommy Lynch	3	William "Bill" Riches
Geoff Palmer	4	Carl R. Turner
Dai Bevan	5	Ivor Watts
Ken Dean	6	Rowley Moat
Stan Kielty	7	Tommy Finn
John Thorley	8	Mick Scott (c)
Alvin Ackerley (c)	9	Tommy Harris
Jack Wilkinson	10	Bob Coverdale
Derrick Schofield	11	Harry Markham
Les Pearce	12	Bill Drake
Albert Fearnley	13	Johnny Whiteley
	Coach	Roy Francis

=== The road to success ===
First round
Castleford	29
Dewsbury	8
Hull Kingston Rovers	21
Keighley	13
Leeds	13
Wakefield Trinity	31
York	5
Halifax	13
Batley	13
Hull F.C.	25
Featherstone Rovers	26
Huddersfield	9
Bramley	16
Doncaster	13
Bradford Northern	27
Hunslet	23

Second round
Castleford	17
Hull Kingston Rovers	0
Wakefield Trinity	4
Halifax	21
Hull F.C.	12
Featherstone Rovers	5
Bramley	5
Bradford Northern	12

Semifinals
Castleford	8
Halifax	24
Hull F.C.	23
Bradford Northern	16

Final
Halifax	10 (0)
Hull F.C.	10 (7)

== See also ==
- 1955–56 Northern Rugby Football League season
- Rugby league county cups
