= 1954–55 Yorkshire Cup =

- Structure: Regional knockout championship
- Teams: 16
- Winners: Halifax
- Runners-up: Hull F.C.

1954–55 was the forty-seventh occasion on which the Yorkshire Cup competition had been held.

Halifax winning the trophy by beating Hull F.C. by the score of 22–14

The match was played at Headingley, Leeds, now in West Yorkshire. The attendance was 25,949 and receipts were £4,638

This was the first of Halifax's two successive victories, both against Hull FC, for whom it was their second of three successive Cup final defeats

== Background ==
This season there were no junior/amateur clubs taking part, no new entrants and no "leavers" and so the total of entries remained the same at sixteen.

This in turn resulted in no byes in the first round.

Last season saw the end of the two-legged home and away ties, and reverted to the whole competition being based on a simple knock-out formulae

== Competition and results ==
=== Round 1 ===
Involved 8 matches (with no byes) and 16 clubs

Game No	Fixture date	Home team	Score	Away team	Venue	Att	Rec	Notes	Ref
1	Fri 10 Sep 1954	Bramley	12–12	Doncaster	Barley Mow				
2	Fri 10 Sep 1954	Hunslet	17–10	Batley	Parkside				
3	Sat 11 Sep 1954	Castleford	10–13	Bradford Northern	Wheldon Road				
4	Sat 11 Sep 1954	Huddersfield	40–17	Keighley	Fartown	10,572			
5	Sat 11 Sep 1954	Hull F.C.	18–4	Featherstone Rovers	Boulevard				
6	Sat 11 Sep 1954	Leeds	57–13	Hull Kingston Rovers	Headingley				
7	Sat 11 Sep 1954	Wakefield Trinity	30–16	Dewsbury	Belle Vue				
8	Sat 11 Sep 1954	York	8–11	Halifax	Clarence Street				

=== Round 1 - replays ===
Involved 1 match and 2 clubs

Game No	Fixture date	Home team	Score	Away team	Venue	Att	Rec	Notes	Ref
R	Thu 16 Sep 1954	Doncaster	4–7	Bramley	Bentley Road Stadium/Tattersfield				

=== Round 2 - quarterfinals ===
Involved 4 matches and 8 clubs

Game No	Fixture date	Home team	Score	Away team	Venue	Att	Rec	Notes	Ref
1	Tue 21 Sep 1954	Bradford Northern	5–3	Hunslet	Odsal				
2	Tue 21 Sep 1954	Huddersfield	7–7	Hull F.C.	Fartown	16,028			
3	Wed 22 Sep 1954	Leeds	27–17	Wakefield Trinity	Headingley				
4	Thu 23 Sep 1954	Bramley	11–22	Halifax	Barley Mow				

=== Round 2 - replays ===
Involved 1 match and 2 clubs

Game No	Fixture date	Home team	Score	Away team	Venue	Att	Rec	Notes	Ref
R	Thu 23 Sep 1954	Hull F.C.	22–13	Huddersfield	Boulevard	17,000			

=== Round 3 – semifinals ===
Involved 2 matches and 4 clubs

Game No	Fixture date	Home team	Score	Away team	Venue	Att	Rec	Notes	Ref
1	Thu 30 Sep 1954	Hull F.C.	10–5	Bradford Northern	Boulevard				
2	Fri 01 Oct 1954	Halifax	10–0	Leeds	Thrum Hall				

=== Final ===
Fixture date	Home team	Score	Away team	Venue	Att	Rec	Notes	Ref
Saturday 23 October 1954	Halifax	22–14	Hull F.C.	Headingley	25,949	£4,638	(Note: Headingley, Leeds, is the home ground of Leeds RLFC with a capacity of 21,000. The record attendance was 40,175 for a league match between Leeds and Bradford Northern on 21 May 1947.)	

==== Teams and scorers ====
Halifax	№	Hull F.C.
	Teams	
Tuss Griffiths	1	Colin Hutton
Arthur Daniels	2	Keith Bowman
Thomas Lynch	3	Roy Francis
Peter Todd	4	Carl Turner
Dai Bevan	5	Bill Riches
Ken Dean	6	Bernard Conway
Stan Kielty	7	Albert Tripp
John Thorley	8	Mick Scott
Alvin Ackerley (c)	9	Tommy Harris
Len Olsen	10	Bob Coverdale
Les Pearce	11	Harry Markham
Jack Wilkinson	12	Norman Hockley
Eric Callighan	13	Johnny Whiteley
??	Coach	Roy Francis
22	score	14
7	HT	4
	Scorers	
	Tries	
	T	
	T	
	T	
	T	
	Goals	
	G	
	G	
	Drop Goals	
	DG	
Referee		unknown

Scoring - Try = three (3) points - Goal = two (2) points - Drop goal = two (2) points

=== The road to success ===
First round
Bramley	12 (7)
Doncaster	12 (4)
York	8
Halifax	11
Leeds	57
Hull Kingston Rovers	13
Wakefield Trinity	30
Dewsbury	16
Huddersfield	40
Keighley	17
Hull F.C.	18
Featherstone Rovers	4
Castleford	10
Bradford Northern	13
Hunslet	17
Batley	10

Second round
Bramley	11
Halifax	22
Leeds	27
Wakefield Trinity	17
Huddersfield	7 (13)
Hull F.C.	7 (22)
Bradford Northern	5
Hunslet	3

Semifinals
Halifax	10
Leeds	0
Hull F.C.	10
Bradford Northern	5

Final
Halifax	22
Hull F.C.	14

== See also ==
- 1954–55 Northern Rugby Football League season
- Rugby league county cups
