= 1955–56 Northern Rugby Football League season =

1955–56 Rugby Football League season
- League: Northern Rugby Football League
- Champions: Hull
- League Leaders: Warrington
- Top point-scorer: Harry Bath 344
- Top try-scorer: Jack McLean 61

The 1955–56 Rugby Football League season was the leagues's 61st season.

== Season summary ==
Belle Vue Rangers dropped out of the competition shortly before the start of the season. There was no time to reschedule and so percentages were used.

In 1955-56 Wigan took part in the Independent Television Association Trophy. This was a series of televised floodlit matches played in London and shown on the newly launched ITV. It only lasted one year but the idea would be picked up again by the BBC in 1965.

ITV Floodlit Competition winners were Warrington who beat Leigh 43–18 in the final.

Hull F.C. won their fourth Rugby Football League Championship when they beat Halifax 10–9 in the play-off final. Warrington had finished the regular season as league leaders.

The Challenge Cup winners were St. Helens who beat Halifax 13–2 in the final.

Warrington won the Lancashire League, and Halifax won the Yorkshire League. Leigh beat Widnes 26–9 to win the Lancashire County Cup, and Halifax beat Hull F.C. 10–10 (replay 7–0) to win the Yorkshire County Cup.

== Championship ==
	Team	Pld	W	D	L	Pts	Pct
1	Warrington	34	27	1	6	55	80.88
2	Halifax	36	28	2	6	58	80.55
3	St. Helens	34	27	0	7	54	79.41
4	Hull	36	25	1	10	51	70.83
5	Wigan	34	22	2	10	46	67.64
6	Featherstone Rovers	36	23	2	11	48	66.66
7	Barrow	34	21	2	11	44	64.70
8	Bradford Northern	36	22	2	12	46	63.88
9	Oldham	34	20	0	14	40	58.82
10	Swinton	34	19	2	13	40	58.82
11	Leigh	34	19	2	13	40	58.82
12	Leeds	36	21	0	15	42	58.33
13	York	36	20	0	16	40	55.55
14	Huddersfield	36	18	1	17	37	51.37
15	Workington Town	34	17	0	17	34	50.00
16	Keighley	36	18	0	18	38	50.00
17	Wakefield Trinity	36	17	0	19	34	47.22
18	Hunslet	36	17	0	19	34	47.22
19	Bramley	34	16	0	18	32	47.05
20	Rochdale Hornets	34	15	0	19	30	44.11
21	Whitehaven	34	14	1	19	29	42.64
22	Salford	34	13	1	20	27	39.70
23	Widnes	34	11	0	23	22	32.35
24	Hull Kingston Rovers	36	11	1	24	23	31.94
25	Doncaster	34	7	5	22	19	27.94
26	Blackpool Borough	34	9	0	25	18	26.47
27	Castleford	36	9	0	27	18	25.00
28	Liverpool City	34	8	0	26	16	23.52
29	Dewsbury	34	8	0	26	16	23.52
30	Batley	34	7	1	26	15	22.05

Play-offs

== Play-offs ==
Semi-finals
1	Warrington	0
4	Hull	17
2	Halifax	23
3	St. Helens	8

Championship final - 12 May 1956
Hull	10
Halifax	9

=== Final ===
12 May 1956

Hull	10 – 9	Halifax
Tries: Finn, Harris; Goals: Hutton (2)		Tries: Daniels, Palmer, Freeman

Maine Road, Manchester
Attendance: 36,675
Referee: C. F. Appleton (Warrington)

Hull	Number	Halifax
	Teams	
Colin Hutton	1	Peter Briers
Brian Darlington	2	Arthur Daniels
Brian Cooper	3	Tommy Lynch
Jack Watkinson	4	Geoff Palmer
Keith Bowman	5	Johnny Freeman
Carl Turner	6	Ken Dean
Tommy Finn	7	Stan Kielty
Mick Scott	8	John Thorley
Tommy Harris	9	Alvin Ackerley
Bob Coverdale	10	Jack Wilkinson
Harry Markham	11	John Henderson
Bill Drake	12	Derrick Schofield
Johnny Whiteley	13	Ken Traill
Roy Francis	Coach	

== Challenge Cup ==
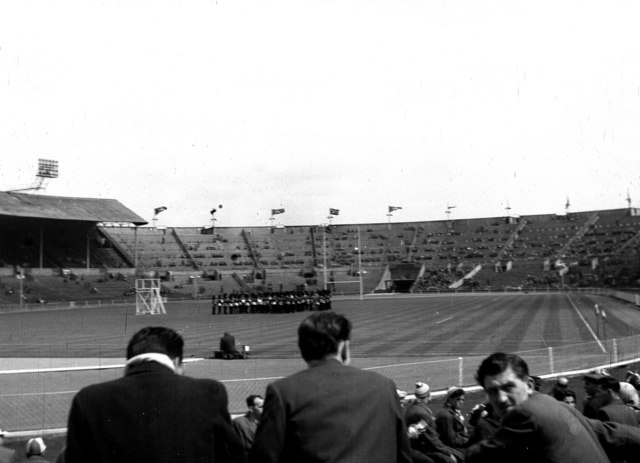
A marching band provides entertainment at Wembley Stadium before the 1956 Challenge Cup final.

In the Challenge Cup tournament's final St. Helens faced Halifax. Played on 28 April 1956 at Wembley Stadium in front of a crowd of 79,341, St Helens won 13–2. This was Saints' first Challenge Cup final win in five Final appearances. Alan Prescott, their prop forward was awarded the Lance Todd Trophy for man-of-the-match.

The St Helens team was greeted enthusiastically upon their return to the North. After detraining at Liverpool the team's open-top coach ride to St Helens attracted an estimated 100,000 people despite pouring rain.

== European Championship ==
This was the fifteenth European Championship and was won for the second time by the Other Nationalities.

=== Results ===
12 September

Other nationalities	33–16	England

Wigan

19 October

Other nationalities	32–19	France

Leigh

10 May

France	23–9	England

Lyon

=== Final standings ===
Team	Played	Won	Drew	Lost	For	Against	Diff	Points
Other nationalities	2	2	0	0	65	35	+30	4
France	2	1	0	1	42	41	+1	2
England	2	0	0	2	25	56	−31	0

== Sources ==
- 1955-56 Rugby Football League season at Wigan.rlfans.com
- The Challenge Cup at The Rugby Football League website
