= 1953–54 Yorkshire Cup =

- Structure: Regional knockout championship
- Teams: 16
- Winners: Bradford Northern
- Runners-up: Hull

The 1953–54 Yorkshire Cup was the forty-sixth occasion on which the Yorkshire Cup competition had been held.

Bradford Northern won the trophy by beating Hull F.C. by the score of 7–2

The match was played at Headingley, Leeds, now in West Yorkshire. The attendance was 22,147 and receipts were £3,833

== Background ==
This season no junior/amateur clubs were invited to take part, there were no new additions and no club "dropped out", and so the number of entrants remained at the same as last season's total number of sixteen.

This in turn resulted in no byes in the first round.

The competition again followed the original formula of a knock-out tournament, with the exception of the first round which was still played on a two-legged home and away basis.

== Competition and results ==
=== Round 1 - First leg ===
Involved 8 matches (with no byes) and 16 clubs

All first round ties are played on a two-legged home and away basis

Game No	Fixture date	Home team	Score	Away team	Venue	agg	Att	Rec	Notes	Ref
1	Sat 5 Sep 1953	Batley	10–34	Bradford Northern	Mount Pleasant					
2	Sat 5 Sep 1953	Castleford	0–11	Halifax	Wheldon Road					
3	Sat 5 Sep 1953	Featherstone Rovers	7–21	Leeds	Post Office Road					
4	Sat 5 Sep 1953	Huddersfield	47–9	Wakefield Trinity	Fartown		16,137			
5	Sat 5 Sep 1953	Hull	30–14	Bramley	Boulevard					
6	Sat 5 Sep 1953	Hunslet	27–13	Hull Kingston Rovers	Parkside					
7	Sat 5 Sep 1953	Keighley	11–6	Dewsbury	Lawkholme Lane					
8	Mon 7 Sep 1953	York	19–2	Doncaster	Clarence Street					

=== Round 1 - Second leg ===
Involved 8 matches (with no byes) and 16 clubs

All first round ties are played on a two-legged home and away basis

Game No	Fixture date	Home team	Score	Away team	Venue	agg	Att	Rec	Notes	Ref
1	Wed 9 Sep 1953	Bradford Northern	15–18	Batley	Odsal	49–28				
2	Mon 7 Sep 1953	Halifax	9–3	Castleford	Thrum Hall	20–3				
3	Wed 9 Sep 1953	Leeds	32–7	Featherstone Rovers	Headingley	53–14				
4	Wed 9 Sep 1953	Wakefield Trinity	20–7	Huddersfield	Belle Vue	29–54	6,222			
5	Tue 8 Sep 1953	Bramley	9–17	Hull	Barley Mow	23–47				
6	Wed 9 Sep 1953	Hull Kingston Rovers	7–11	Hunslet	Craven Park (1)	20–38				
7	Tue 8 Sep 1953	Dewsbury	2–0	Keighley	Crown Flatt	8–11				
8	Thu 10 Sep 1953	Doncaster	2–21	York	Bentley Road Stadium/Tattersfield	4–40			(Note: The first Yorkshire Cup match played by Doncaster at their new Bentley Road Stadium - soon to be renamed "Tatters field" (or Tattersfield) after the former chairman Len Tattersfield.)	

=== Round 2 - quarterfinals ===
Involved 4 matches and 8 clubs

All second round ties are played on a knock-out basis

Game No	Fixture date	Home team	Score	Away team	Venue	agg	Att	Rec	Notes	Ref
1	Wed 23 Sep 1953	Bradford Northern	27–9	Leeds	Odsal					
2	Wed 23 Sep 1953	Huddersfield	19–7	York	Fartown		9,425			
3	Wed 23 Sep 1953	Hunslet	11–2	Keighley	Parkside					
4	Mon 28 Sep 1953	Hull	16–4	Halifax	Boulevard					

=== Round 3 – semifinals ===
Involved 2 matches and 4 clubs

Both semi-final ties are played on a knock-out basis

Game No	Fixture date	Home team	Score	Away team	Venue	agg	Att	Rec	Notes	Ref
1	Wed 30 Sep 1953	Huddersfield	10–11	Bradford Northern	Fartown		15,438			
2	Wed 21 Oct 1953	Hunslet	2–3	Hull	Parkside				(Note: Match abandoned after 32 minutes due to fog.)	

=== Round 3 – semifinals - replay ===
Involved 2 matches and 4 clubs

Both semi-final ties are played on a knock-out basis

Game No	Fixture date	Home team	Score	Away team	Venue	agg	Att	Rec	Notes	Ref
R	Thu 22 Oct 1953	Hunslet	5–9	Hull	Parkside					

=== Final ===
Fixture date	Home team	Score	Away team	Venue	agg	Att	Rec	Notes	Ref
Saturday 31 October 1953	Bradford Northern	7–2	Hull	Headingley		22,147	£3,833	(Note: Headingley, Leeds, is the home ground of Leeds RLFC with a capacity of 21,000. The record attendance was 40,175 for a league match between Leeds and Bradford Northern on 21 May 1947.)	

==== Teams and scorers ====
Bradford Northern	№	Hull
	Teams	
Joe Phillips	1	Colin Hutton
Bob Hawes	2	Keith Bowman
Joe Mageen	3	Bill Riches
Bill Seddon	4	Carl Turner
Jack McLean	5	Ivor Watts
Bill Jenkins	6	Bernard Conway
Roy Goddard	7	Albert Tripp
Barry Tyler	8	Mick Scott
Norman Haley	9	Tommy Harris
Wynn Jones	10	Bob Coverdale
Trevor Foster	11	Harry Markham
Tony Storey	12	Arthur Bedford
Ken Traill	13	Johnny Whiteley
Dai Rees	Coach	Roy Francis
7	score	2
7	HT	0
	Scorers	
Bob Hawes	Tries	
	T	
Joe Phillips (2)	Goals	Colin Hutton
	G	
	G	
Referee		George Phillips (Widnes)

Scoring - Try = three (3) points - Goal = two (2) points - Drop goal = two (2) points

=== The road to success ===
All the ties in the first round were played on a two leg (home and away) basis.

For the first round ties, the first club named in each of the ties played the first leg at home.

For the first round ties, the scores shown are the aggregate score over the two legs.

First round
Huddersfield	54
Wakefield Trinity	29
York	40
Doncaster	4
Batley	28
Bradford Northern	49
Featherstone Rovers	14
Leeds	53
Hunslet	38
Hull Kingston Rovers	20
Keighley	11
Dewsbury	8
Hull	47
Bramley	23
Castleford	3
Halifax	20

Second round
Huddersfield	19
York	7
Bradford Northern	27
Leeds	9
Hunslet	11
Keighley	2
Hull	16
Halifax	4

Semifinals
Huddersfield	10
Bradford Northern	11
Hunslet	5
Hull	9

Final
Bradford Northern	7
Hull	2

== See also ==
- 1953–54 Northern Rugby Football League season
- Rugby league county cups
