= 1955–56 Challenge Cup =

Rugby league competition

- Duration: 5 rounds
- Winners: St Helens
- Runners-up: Halifax
- Lance Todd Trophy: Alan Prescott

The 1955–56 Challenge Cup was the 55th staging of rugby league's oldest knockout competition, the Challenge Cup.

== First round ==
Date	Team one	Score one	Team two	Score two
11 Feb	Castleford	12	Blackpool	9
11 Feb	Huddersfield	8	Whitehaven	4
11 Feb	Hull FC	4	Leeds	9
11 Feb	Hunslet	9	Bradford Northern	10
11 Feb	Keighley	33	Triangle Valve	8
11 Feb	Leigh	19	Doncaster	10
11 Feb	Oldham	31	Dewsbury	2
11 Feb	Rochdale Hornets	55	Stanningley	0
11 Feb	St Helens	15	Warrington	6
11 Feb	Wakefield Trinity	30	Bramley	10
11 Feb	Widnes	10	Halifax	22
11 Feb	Wigan	24	Featherstone Rovers	11
11 Feb	Workington Town	16	Salford	0
11 Feb	York	2	Barrow	26
15 Feb	Liverpool	13	Hull Kingston Rovers	5
15 Feb	Swinton	18	Batley	0

== Second round ==
Date	Team one	Score one	Team two	Score two
3 Mar	Barrow	47	Liverpool	5
3 Mar	Halifax	10	Workington Town	3
3 Mar	Keighley	3	Wigan	12
3 Mar	Leeds	12	Oldham	7
3 Mar	Leigh	5	Wakefield Trinity	11
3 Mar	Rochdale Hornets	2	Bradford Northern	5
3 Mar	St Helens	48	Castleford	5
3 Mar	Swinton	6	Huddersfield	8

== Quarterfinals ==
Date	Team one	Score one	Team two	Score two
24 Mar	Leeds	9	Halifax	14
24 Mar	St Helens	53	Bradford Northern	6
24 Mar	Wakefield Trinity	10	Barrow	14
24 Mar	Wigan	24	Huddersfield	2

== Semifinals ==
Date	Team one	Score one	Team two	Score two
7 Apr	Halifax	11	Wigan	10
7 Apr	St Helens	5	Barrow	5
11 Apr	St Helens	10	Barrow	5

== Final ==
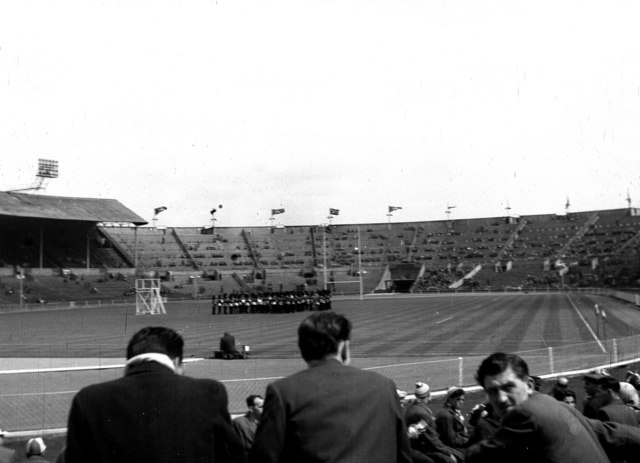
A marching band provides entertainment at Wembley Stadium before the 1956 Challenge Cup final.

In the Challenge Cup tournament's final St. Helens faced Halifax. Played on 28 April 1956 at Wembley Stadium in front of a crowd of 79,341, St Helens won 13-2. This was Saints' first Challenge Cup final win in five Final appearances. Alan Prescott, their prop forward was awarded the Lance Todd Trophy for man-of-the-match.

The St Helens team was greeted enthusiastically upon their return to the North. After detraining at Liverpool the team's open-top coach ride to St Helens attracted an estimated 100,000 people despite pouring rain.

28 April 1956

St Helens	13 – 2	Halifax
Try Carlton, Llewellyn, Prescott; Goals Rhodes (2)		Goals Griffiths

Wembley, London
Attendance: 79,341 (HT 0-0)
Player of the Match: Alan Prescott

1	Glyn Moses
2	Steve Llewellyn
3	Duggie Greenall
4	Brian Howard
5	Frank Carlton
6	Bill Finnan
7	Austin Rhodes
8	Alan Prescott (c)
9	Len McIntyre
10	Nat Silcock Jr.
11	George Parsons
12	Roy Robinson
13	Vince Karalius
Coach:
Jim Sullivan

1	Tyssul Griffiths
2	Arthur Daniels
3	Thomas Lynch
4	Geoffrey "Geoff" Palmer
5	John Freeman
6	Ken Dean
7	Stan Kielty
8	Ken Traill
9	Albert Fearnley
10	Les Pearce
11	Jack Wilkinson
12	Alvin Ackerley (c)
13	John Henderson
Coach:
