= Michael Scott (rugby league) =

England international rugby league footballer

Mick Scott
Personal information
- Full name: Michael Scott
- Born: c. 1930
- Died: 1968 (aged 37); Hull, England

Playing information
- Position: Second-row, Prop
Club
| Years | Team | Pld | T | G | FG | P |
|---|---|---|---|---|---|---|
| 1948–63 | Hull FC | 459 | 43 | 3 | 0 | 135 |
| 1963–64 | Rochdale Hornets | 32 |
| | Total | 491 | 43 | 3 | 0 | 135 |
Representative
| Years | Team | Pld | T | G | FG | P |
| 1951–53 | England | 3 | 0 | 0 | 0 | 0 |
| 1951–58 | Yorkshire | 16 | 2 | 0 | 0 | 6 |

Michael "Mick"/"Mike" Scott (c. 1930 – 1968) was an English professional rugby league footballer who played in the 1940s, 1950s and 1960s. He played at representative level for England, and at club level for Hull FC and Rochdale Hornets, as a prop or second-row, and was captain of Hull during the 1955–56 season and 1956–57 season, and deputised in the 1962–63 season as Johnny Whiteley missed entire season through injury.

== Background ==
Mick Scott was killed aged 37 in an accident on the docks in Hull, East Riding of Yorkshire, England.

== Playing career ==
=== International honours ===
Mick Scott won caps for England while at Hull in 1951 against Wales, in 1952 against Other Nationalities, and in 1953 against Wales.

=== Championship final appearances ===
Mick Scott played, and was captain in Hull FC's 10–9 victory over Halifax in the Championship Final during the 1955–56 season at Maine Road, Manchester on Saturday 12 May 1956, played in the 14–15 defeat by Oldham in the 1956-57 Championship Final at Odsal Stadium on Saturday 18 May 1957, and played, and scored a try in the 20–3 victory over Workington Town in the Championship Final during the 1957-58 season at Odsal Stadium on Saturday 17 May 1958.

=== Challenge Cup Final appearances ===
Mick Scott played at prop in Hull FC's 13–30 defeat by Wigan in the 1959 Challenge Cup Final during the 1958–59 season at Wembley Stadium, London on Saturday 9 May 1959, in front of a crowd of 79,811, and played at prop in the 5–38 defeat by Wakefield Trinity in the 1960 Challenge Cup Final during the 1959–60 season at Wembley Stadium, London on Saturday 14 May 1960, in front of a crowd of 79,773.

=== County Cup Final appearances ===
Mick Scott played in Hull FC's 2–7 defeat by Bradford Northern in the 1953 Yorkshire Cup Final during the 1953–54 season at Headingley, Leeds on Saturday 31 October 1953, played on the 14–22 defeat by Halifax in the 1954 Yorkshire Cup Final during the 1954–55 season at Headingley, Leeds on Saturday 23 October 1954, played, and was captain in the 10–10 draw with Halifax in the 1955 Yorkshire Cup Final during the 1955–56 season at Headingley, Leeds on Saturday 22 October 1955, and played, and was captain in the 0–7 defeat by Halifax in the 1955 Yorkshire Cup Final replay during the 1955–56 season at Odsal Stadium, Bradford on Wednesday 2 November 1955, and played in the 14–15 defeat by Featherstone Rovers in the 1959 Yorkshire Cup Final during the 1959–60 season at Headingley, Leeds on Saturday 31 October 1959, in front of a crowd of 23,983.

=== European Club Champions Final appearances ===
Mick Scott played, was captain, and scored a drop goal in Hull FC's victory in the European Club Champions Final during the 1956–57 season.
