= John Barton (rugby league) =

GB international rugby league footballer

Personal information
- Full name: John T. Barton
- Born: June 1934 Wigan, England
- Died: March 1994 (aged 59)

Playing information
- Position: Prop
Club
Years	Team	Pld	T	G	FG	P
1955–56	Leigh	34
1956–66	Wigan	278	24	0		72
	Total	312	24	0	0	72
Representative
Years	Team	Pld	T	G	FG	P
1958–62	Lancashire	11	2	0	0	6
1960–61	Great Britain	2	0	0	0	0

John Barton (c. 1934 – 1994) was an English professional rugby league footballer who played in the 1950s and 1960s. He played at representative level for Great Britain, and at club level for Leigh, and Wigan, as a prop.

== Playing career ==
=== International honours ===
John Barton won caps for Great Britain while at Wigan in 1960 against France, and in 1961 against New Zealand.

=== Championship final appearances ===
John Barton played at prop in Wigan's 27-3 victory over Wakefield Trinity in the Championship Final during the 1959–60 season at Odsal, Bradford on Saturday 21 May 1960.

=== Challenge Cup Final appearances ===
John Barton played at prop and scored a try in Wigan's 13–9 victory over Workington Town in the 1958 Challenge Cup Final during the 1957–58 season at Wembley Stadium, London on Saturday 10 May 1958, in front of a crowd of 66,109, and played at prop in the 30-13 victory over Hull F.C. in the 1959 Challenge Cup Final during the 1958–59 season at Wembley Stadium, London on Saturday 9 May 1959, in front of a crowd of 79,811.

=== County League appearances ===
John Barton played in Wigan's victories in the Lancashire League during the 1958–59 season and 1961–62 season.
