= Cec Thompson =

GB international rugby league footballer and coach

Personal information
- Full name: Theodore Cecil Thompson
- Born: 12 July 1926 Durham, England
- Died: 19 July 2011 (aged 85)

Playing information
- Position: Wing, second-row, Loose forward
Club
Years	Team	Pld	T	G	FG	P
1948–53	Hunslet	96	9	0	0	27
1953–60	Workington Town	192	55	0	0	165
1960–62	Barrow	2	0	0	0	0
	Total	290	64	0	0	192
Representative
Years	Team	Pld	T	G	FG	P
1951	Great Britain	2	0	0	0	0
1951	British Empire XIII	2	0	0	0	0

Coaching information
Club
Years	Team	Gms	W	D	L	W%
1960–62	Barrow	0	0	0	0

Theodore Cecil Thompson (12 July 1926 – 19 July 2011) was an English professional rugby league footballer who played in the 1940s, 1950s and 1960s.

== Biography ==
Thompson was born in County Durham, the son of a mother from Durham, and a Trinidadian father. His father was a master painter-decorator who had arrived in England as a corporal in the British West Indies Regiment, and was stationed in County Durham, where he met Cec’s mother, a miner’s daughter.

Cec’s father died before Cec was born, in Leeds. He had been contracted to put gold leaf on the walls of Leeds Town Hall, a contract that included a house and relative prosperity. His father’s death at the age of 39 saw his mother return to her family home in the northeast to give birth to Cec before she moved back to Leeds. Alas, through poverty, she was unable to bring up four children alone, and Cec and his siblings were subsequently scattered across England. Cec was fostered in Warminster in Wiltshire, and then spent the rest of his childhood in a series of orphanages in Somerset, Cheshire and the northeast.. His father died before he was born. With his mother, Florence Greenwell, the daughter of a miner, he soon moved to Leeds. With four children, she struggled and he was fostered at a few months old. His childhood was spent in a succession of orphanages.

Thompson took up rugby league when working near Hunslet. In 1951, the rugby commentator Eddie Waring wrote: "If Cec Thompson is not chosen for the Great Britain squad to face New Zealand, the selectors must be racists." Four years after his potential was spotted by a Hunslet scout, he played for Great Britain in 1951, only the second black player to do so (the first was Roy Fisher). However, his debut in the game with New Zealand was headlined in the Daily Herald as "Hunslet's Darkie one of Britain's heroes." In 1953, he transferred to Workington Town in Cumbria.

All of Thompson's games for Hunslet, and in representative matches were as a second-row. For Workington in Cumbria he played 164 games as a second-row, twenty-two as a positions, and six as a wing.

Cec Thompson played right-second-row in Workington Town's 9–13 defeat by Wigan in the 1958 Challenge Cup Final during the 1957–58 season at Wembley Stadium, London on Saturday 10 May 1958.

At Barrow, with the side plagued by injury, he played two games as a second-row against Bramley and Blackpool Borough, to make up the numbers. In the last two years of his career, he was coach of Barrow becoming the second black coach in the sport. In this, he once more followed the lead of Roy Francis.

He was one of the founders of the Student Rugby League in the United Kingdom, when along with Andrew Cudbertson and Jack Abernathy, he founded a team at the Leeds University in 1967.

Thompson built up his own window cleaning business in Workington, and then qualified to teach Economics with a degree from the University of Leeds, and a teaching diploma. Initially he taught at Dinnington Comprehensive School, and then at Chesterfield Grammar School, where he was head of economics and master in charge of rugby. He received an honorary MA degree from Leeds University in 1994 for services to the community, and the freedom of the borough of Allerdale in the Lake District in 2003.
