= Nan Halafihi =

Tongan rugby league footballer (1934–1979)

Personal information
- Full name: Nanumi Halafihi
- Born: c. 1934 Taunga, Tonga
- Died: 23 April 1979 (aged 45) Bridlington, England

Playing information
- Position: Centre
Club
Years	Team	Pld	T	G	FG	P
1958–60	Doncaster
1960–64	Hull F.C.	21	6	0	0	18
	Total	21	6	0	0	18

Nanumi "Nan" Halafihi (c. 1934 – 1979) was a Tongan rugby league footballer who played as a centre for Doncaster and Hull F.C. He was the first Tongan to play at Wembley, and is believed to be the first ever Tongan to play professional rugby league.

== Playing career ==
Born in Tonga, Halafihi moved to England in 1958 along with his elder brother Johnny, who was a professional boxer. After initially trying to follow his brother into boxing, he turned his hand to rugby league, signing for Doncaster.

Halafihi was signed by Hull F.C. in January 1960. He went on to make 16 appearances for Hull during the 1959–60 season, including the 1960 Challenge Cup final at Wembley.

He made only sporadic appearances the following season, playing five games before breaking his collarbone in a match against Huddersfield, and subsequently made no further first team appearances for the club. In 1964, he was offered to Batley on a free transfer.

== Death and legacy ==
Halafihi had a wife, with whom he had three children. A son, Nick, played rugby league for a number of clubs and later became a senior lecturer at Leeds Beckett University. His grandson Vila has also played rugby league. He died of liver cancer on 23 April 1979, aged 45.

In 2023, a new award was named in his honour, the Nan Halafihi Medal, which was presented to the Player of the Series in the three-match Test series between England and Tonga. The inaugural award was won by Harry Smith.
