= Roy Robinson (rugby league) =

English rugby league footballer

Personal information
- Full name: Roy Robinson
- Born: 26 January 1931; Prescot, England
- Died: 19 July 1999 (aged 68); St Helens, Merseyside, England

Playing information
- Height: 5 ft 10 in (178 cm)
- Weight: 11 st 5 lb (72 kg)
- Position: Second-row, Loose forward
Club
Years	Team	Pld	T	G	FG	P
1955–58	St. Helens	59	15	0	0	45
1958–59	Barrow	8	2	0	0	6
1959–60	Warrington	17	0	0	0	0
	Total	84	17	0	0	51

Roy Robinson (26 January 1931 – 1999) was an English professional rugby league footballer who played in the 1950s and 1960s. He played at club level for St Helens, Barrow and Warrington, as a second-row or loose forward.

== Background ==
Roy Robinson's birth was registered in Prescot, Lancashire, he lived on Wilson Street, attended Rivington Road School, and played rugby on "The Bruk", a piece of wasteland adjacent to the Beecham's factory in St. Helens, he played snooker and dominoes at Windle Labour club, he died aged 68 at his home on Cowley Hill Lane, St Helens, Merseyside.

== Playing career ==
=== Challenge Cup Final appearances ===
Roy Robinson played at second-row in St. Helens' 13-2 victory over Halifax in the 1955–56 Challenge Cup Final during the 1955–56 season at Wembley Stadium, London on Saturday 28 April 1956, in front of a crowd of 79,341. Although Roy Robinson had previously played 6-matches for St. Helens, he replaced the injured Walter Delves in the 1956 Challenge Cup final, which was the first ever match he had played in the Challenge Cup.

=== Notable tour matches ===
Roy Robinson played at second-row and scored a try in St. Helens' 16-8 victory over New Zealand in the 1955–56 New Zealand rugby tour of Great Britain and France during the 1955–56 season at Knowsley Road, St. Helens on Wednesday 26 October 1955, in front of a crowd of 11,327.

=== Club career ===
Roy Robinson was transferred from St. Helens to Barrow along with Walter Delves for a combined fee of £2,260 (based on increases in average earnings, this would be approximately £112,500 in 2015), he made his début for Warrington on Saturday 28 November 1959, and he played his last match for Warrington on Saturday 30 April 1960.

== Genealogical information ==
Roy Robinson was the son of the rugby league footballer for St. Helens, Alfred "Alf" Robinson. Roy Robinson's marriage to Doreen (née Blakoe) was registered during fourth ¼ 1958 in St. Helens district. They had children; David Robinson (birth registered during second ¼ 1959 (age 65–66) in St. Helens district), and Lynn Robinson (birth registered during first ¼ 1970 (age 54–55) in St. Helens district).
