= 1957–58 Challenge Cup =

Rugby league competition

- Duration: 5 rounds
- Number of teams: 32
- Highest attendance: 66,109
- Broadcast partners: BBC TV
- Winners: Wigan
- Runners-up: Workington Town
- Lance Todd Trophy: Rees Thomas

The 1957–58 Challenge Cup was the 57th staging of rugby league's oldest knockout competition, the Challenge Cup.

The final was contested by Wigan and Workington Town at Wembley Stadium in London.

The final was played on Saturday 10 May 1958, where Wigan beat Workington 13–9 in front of a crowd of 66,109.

The Lance Todd Trophy was awarded to Wigan scrum-half Rees Thomas.

== First round ==
Date	Team one	Score one	Team two	Score two
08 Feb	Huddersfield	0	Halifax	15
08 Feb	Hull FC	13	Rochdale Hornets	16
08 Feb	Leeds	31	Castleford	6
08 Feb	Oldham	23	Hull Kingston Rovers	6
08 Feb	Swinton	6	Featherstone Rovers	9
08 Feb	Widnes	51	Orford Tannery	2
08 Feb	Wigan	39	Whitehaven	10
08 Feb	Workington Town	3	Leigh	0
11 Feb	Dewsbury	2	Blackpool	4
11 Feb	Keighley	12	Salford	6
12 Feb	Batley	6	Warrington	27
12 Feb	Bramley	9	Bradford Northern	15
12 Feb	Hunslet	0	St Helens	15
12 Feb	Wakefield Trinity	29	Doncaster	0
12 Feb	York	50	Lock Lane	5
13 Feb	Barrow	36	Liverpool	2

== Second round ==
Date	Team one	Score one	Team two	Score two
22 Feb	Blackpool	5	Oldham	12
22 Feb	Featherstone Rovers	9	Barrow	5
22 Feb	Halifax	12	Warrington	17
22 Feb	Keighley	4	St Helens	19
22 Feb	Rochdale Hornets	11	Bradford Northern	8
22 Feb	Wakefield Trinity	5	Wigan	11
22 Feb	Widnes	5	Workington Town	8
22 Feb	York	7	Leeds	2

== Quarterfinals ==
Date	Team one	Score one	Team two	Score two
08 Mar	Featherstone Rovers	5	St Helens	0
08 Mar	Oldham	0	Wigan	8
08 Mar	Rochdale Hornets	8	York	5
08 Mar	Workington Town	11	Warrington	0

== Semifinals ==
Date	Team one	Score one	Team two	Score two
29 Mar	Workington Town	8	Featherstone Rovers	2
29 Mar	Wigan	5	Rochdale Hornets	3

== Final ==
10 May 1958

Wigan	13 – 9	Workington Town
Try: Sullivan, Barton, McTigue; Goal: Cunliffe (2)	Report	Try: Southward; Goal: Southward (3)

Wembley Stadium, London
Attendance: 66,109
Referee: Ron Gelder (Wakefield)

FB	1	Jack Cunliffe
RW	2	Terry O'Grady
RC	3	Eric Ashton
LC	4	Billy Boston
LW	5	Mick Sullivan
SO	6	Dave Bolton
SH	7	Rees Thomas
PR	8	John Barton
HK	9	Bill Sayer
PR	10	Brian McTigue
SR	11	Norman Cherrington
SR	12	Frank Collier
LF	13	Bernard McGurrin
Coach:
Joe Egan

FB	1	John McAvoy
RW	2	Ike Southward
RC	3	John O'Neil
LC	4	Danny Leatherbarrow
LW	5	Bill Wookey
SO	6	Harry Archer
SH	7	Sol Roper
PR	8	Norman Herbert
HK	9	Bert Eden
PR	10	Andy Key
SR	11	Brian Edgar
SR	12	Cec Thompson
LF	13	Benny Eve
Coach:
Jim Brough
