= Bob Coverdale =

GB international rugby league footballer

Personal information
- Full name: Robin Coverdale
- Born: fourth ¼ 1928; Sculcoates district, Hull, England
- Died: 21 May 2009 (aged 80–81); Beverley, East Riding of Yorkshire, England

Playing information
- Position: Prop
Club
Years	Team	Pld	T	G	FG	P
1951–57	Hull FC
1957–58	Wakefield Trinity	28	1	0	0	3
1958–≥62	Hull Kingston Rovers	161	5	0	0	15
	Total	189	6	0	0	18
Representative
Years	Team	Pld	T	G	FG	P
1954	Great Britain	4	0	0	0	0

Robin "Bob" Coverdale (fourth ¼ 1928 – May 21, 2009), also known by the nickname of "The Major of Dunswell", was an English World Cup winning professional rugby league footballer who played in the 1950s and 1960s, and coached in the 1970s. He played at representative level for Great Britain, and at club level for Hull FC, Wakefield Trinity and Hull Kingston Rovers, as a prop. and coached at club level for Beverley A.R.L.F.C.

== Background ==
Coverdale's birth was registered in Sculcoates district, Hull, East Riding of Yorkshire, England.

== Playing career ==
=== Club career ===
Coverdale played in Hull FC's 2–7 defeat by Bradford Northern in the 1953–54 Yorkshire Cup Final during the 1953–54 season at Headingley, Leeds on Saturday 31 October 1953, the 14–22 defeat by Halifax in the 1954–55 Yorkshire Cup Final during the 1954–55 season at Headingley, Leeds on Saturday 23 October 1954, the 10–10 draw with Halifax in the 1955–56 Yorkshire Cup Final during the 1955–56 season at Headingley, Leeds on Saturday 22 October 1955, and the 0–7 defeat by Halifax in the 1955–56 Yorkshire Cup Final replay during the 1955–56 season at Odsal Stadium, Bradford on Wednesday 2 November 1955.

Coverdale made his début for Wakefield Trinity during February 1957, and he played his last match for Wakefield Trinity during the 1957–58 season.

Coverdale played at prop in Hull Kingston Rovers' 13–10 victory over Huddersfield in the Eastern Division Championship Final during the 1962–63 season at Headingley, Leeds on Saturday 10 November 1962.

=== International honours ===
Coverdale won caps for Great Britain while at Hull in the 1954 Rugby League World Cup against Australia, France, New Zealand, and France.

Coverdale played at prop in all four of Great Britain's 1954 Rugby League World Cup matches, including Great Britain’s 16–12 victory over France in the 1954 Rugby League World Cup Final at Parc des Princes, Paris on Saturday 13 November 1954.
