= Bill Drake (rugby league) =

GB & England international rugby league footballer

Personal information
- Full name: William Desmond Drake
- Born: 20 February 1931 Workington, Cumbria, England
- Died: 8 October 2012 (aged 81) York, England

Playing information
- Height: 6 ft 2 in (1.88 m)
- Position: Wing, Prop, Second-row
Club
Years	Team	Pld	T	G	FG	P
1952–63	Hull FC	292	101	53	0	409
1963–64	Leeds	32	2	3	0	12
196?–??	York
	Total	324	103	56	0	421
Representative
Years	Team	Pld	T	G	FG	P
1953–??	Cumberland	10
1962	England	1	0	0	0	0
1962	Great Britain	1	0	0	0	0
- Relatives: Jim Drake (brother)

William D. Drake (20 February 1931 – 8 October 2012) was an English professional rugby league footballer who played in the 1950s and 1960s. He played at representative level for Great Britain, England and Cumberland, and at club level for Heworth A.R.L.F.C., Hull FC, Leeds and York as a back, and later a forward.

== Background ==
Bill Drake was born in Workington, Cumberland, and was the younger (by 10-minutes) twin brother of fellow rugby league footballer; Jim Drake, exactly four years to the day after the death of his twin brother Jim Drake, Bill Drake died aged 81 in York Hospital, North Yorkshire, England.

== Playing career ==
Drake won 10-caps for Cumberland from 1953, and played in Hull FC's 10–9 victory over Halifax in the Championship Final during the 1955–56 season at Maine Road, Manchester on Saturday 12 May 1956. He played at second-row in Hull FC's 13–30 defeat by Wigan in the 1958–59 Challenge Cup Final during the 1958–59 season at Wembley Stadium, London on Saturday 9 May 1959. Drake missed the 1959–60 Challenge Cup Final during the 1959–60 season though injury, being replaced by Mike Smith who became the first player to ever make a first team début in a Challenge Cup Final.

Drake won a cap for England while at Hull in 1962 against France, and won a cap for Great Britain while at Hull in 1962 also against France.

Drake was transferred from Hull to Leeds in 1963 for £1,500 (based on increases in average earnings, this would be approximately £56,890 in 2013).

Drake played at prop in Leeds' 2–18 defeat by Wakefield Trinity in the 1964–65 Yorkshire Cup Final during the 1964–65 season at Fartown Ground, Huddersfield on Saturday 31 October 1964.
