= 1958–59 Challenge Cup =

Rugby league competition

- Duration: 5 rounds
- Number of teams: 32
- Highest attendance: 79,811
- Broadcast partners: BBC TV
- Winners: Wigan
- Runners-up: Hull
- Lance Todd Trophy: Brian McTigue

The 1958–59 Challenge Cup was the 58th staging of rugby league's oldest knockout competition, the Challenge Cup.

The final was contested by Wigan and Hull F.C. at Wembley Stadium in London.

The final was played on Saturday 9 May 1959, where Wigan beat Hull 30–13 in front of a crowd of 79,811.

The Lance Todd Trophy was awarded to Wigan second-row Brian McTigue.

== First round ==
Date	Team one	Score one	Team two	Score two
21 Feb	Bradford Northern	2	Huddersfield	11
21 Feb	Bramley	8	Castleford	11
21 Feb	Doncaster	9	Dewsbury	15
21 Feb	Hull FC	11	Blackpool	2
21 Feb	Hull Kingston Rovers	3	Widnes	2
21 Feb	Hunslet	55	Kells Recs Centre	9
21 Feb	Leigh	19	Batley	2
21 Feb	Oldham	6	St Helens	7
21 Feb	Rochdale Hornets	9	Halifax	10
21 Feb	Salford	15	Barrow	0
21 Feb	Wakefield Trinity	18	Swinton	2
21 Feb	Warrington	26	Keighley	7
21 Feb	Whitehaven	25	Liverpool	6
21 Feb	Wigan	12	Leeds	5
21 Feb	Workington Town	5	Featherstone Rovers	8
21 Feb	York	54	Astley & Tyldesley	2

== Second round ==
Date	Team one	Score one	Team two	Score two
7 Mar	Hull FC	4	Wakefield Trinity	4
7 Mar	Hull Kingston Rovers	20	Castleford	0
7 Mar	Leigh	13	Warrington	3
7 Mar	St Helens	35	Dewsbury	8
7 Mar	Salford	15	Huddersfield	2
7 Mar	Whitehaven	2	Halifax	7
7 Mar	Wigan	22	Hunslet	4
7 Mar	York	7	Featherstone Rovers	18
11 Mar	Wakefield Trinity	10	Hull FC	16

== Quarterfinals ==
Date	Team one	Score one	Team two	Score two
21 Mar	Featherstone Rovers	20	St Helens	6
21 Mar	Halifax	0	Wigan	26
21 Mar	Hull FC	23	Hull Kingston Rovers	9
21 Mar	Leigh	6	Salford	6
25 Mar	Salford	4	Leigh	6

== Semifinals ==
Date	Team one	Score one	Team two	Score two
11 Apr	Hull	15	Featherstone Rovers	5
11 Apr	Wigan	5	Leigh	0

== Final ==
9 May 1959

Wigan	30 – 13	Hull
Try: Boston (2), Holden, Sullivan, Bolton, McTigue; Goal: Griffiths (6)	Report	Try: Finn; Goal: Keegan (5)

Wembley Stadium, London
Attendance: 79,811
Referee: Charlie Appleton (Warrington)
Player of the Match: Brian McTigue

FB	1	Fred Griffiths
RW	2	Billy Boston
RC	3	Eric Ashton
LC	4	Keith Holden
LW	5	Mick Sullivan
SO	6	Dave Bolton
SH	7	Rees Thomas
PR	8	Bill Bretherton
HK	9	Bill Sayer
PR	10	John Barton
SR	11	Brian McTigue
SR	12	Norman Cherrington
LF	13	Roy Evans
Coach:
Joe Egan

FB	1	Arthur Keegan
RW	2	Stan Cowan
RC	3	Brian Cooper
LC	4	Brian Saville
LW	5	Ivor Watts
SO	6	George Matthews
SH	7	Tommy Finn
PR	8	Mike Scott
HK	9	Tommy Harris
PR	10	Jim Drake
SR	11	Cyril Sykes
SR	12	Bill Drake
LF	13	Johnny Whiteley (c)
Coach:
Roy Francis
