= McGurrin =

McGurrin is a surname. Notable people with the surname include:

- Bernard McGurrin (born 1933–2024), English rugby league footballer
- Frank E. McGurrin (1861–1933), American stenographer and inventor
- Terry McGurrin (born 1968), Canadian voice actor, comedian, and writer
