= Ivor Watts =

Welsh former RL coach & professional rugby league footballer

Ivor J. Watts
Personal information
- Full name: Ivor Watts
- Born: 28 November 1924; Rhondda Valley, South Wales, Wales
- Died: 19 March 2006 (aged 81); Hull, East Riding of Yorkshire, England

Playing information
- Height: 155 cm (5 ft 1 in)
- Weight: 66 kg (10 st 6 lb)
- Position: Wing
Club
| Years | Team | Pld | T | G | FG | P |
|---|---|---|---|---|---|---|
| 1945–60 | Hull F.C. | 412 | 216 | 5 | 0 | 658 |
Representative
| Years | Team | Pld | T | G | FG | P |
| 1946–58 | Cumberland | 12 | 3 | 0 | 0 | 9 |

Coaching information
Club
| Years | Team | Gms | W | D | L | W% |
| 1970–71 | Hull F.C. | 45 | 28 | 0 | 17 | 62 |
- Source: As of 12 March 2021

Ivor J. Watts (28 November 1924 – 19 March 2006) was a Welsh postman, and professional rugby league footballer who played in the 1940s, 1950s and 1960s, and coached in the 1970s. He played for Hull F.C. from 1945 to 1960, and also represented Cumberland from 1952 to 1953. Ivor's last match for Hull F.C. was playing at Wembley on 14 May 1960 in the 1959–60 Challenge Cup Final against Wakefield Trinity in which Hull FC lost 5–38. After his last match he was then appointed assistant-coach from 1960 to 1970. He became head-coach from 1970 to 1971 after Johnny Whiteley resigned. During the time Ivor coached Hull F.C. they won 28 out of 45 matches and lost 17. The highest win was 47–5 against Doncaster RLFC.

== Playing career ==
Ivor Watts playing career started when he moved to Kingston upon Hull in 1945 and joined Hull F.C. He then played for them from 1945 until 1960. In between his time at Hull FC he also represented his former city's, Cumberland from 1952 to 1953 playing 12 times and scoring 3 tries. With 214 tries, Ivor Watts is second in Hull FC's all-time try scoring list, behind Clive Sullivan with 250 tries. Also he is Hull F.C. top try scorer for local derby matches against Hull Kingston Rovers, with Kirk Yeaman just behind him.

Watts played, and scored a try in Hull FC's 10–10 draw with Halifax RLFC in the 1955–56 Yorkshire Cup Final during the 1955–56 season at Headingley, Leeds on Saturday 22 October 1955, and played in Hull's 0–7 defeat by Halifax RLFC in the 1955–56 Yorkshire Cup Final replay during the 1955–56 season at Odsal Stadium on Wednesday 2 November 1955.

Watts played on the wing in Hull F.C.'s 13–30 defeat by Wigan in the 1958–59 Challenge Cup Final during the 1958–59 season at Wembley Stadium, London on Saturday 9 May 1959.

== Post playing ==
After working as assistant-coach from 1959 to 1970, from 1970 to 1971 Watts was Hull F.C.'s head-coach.
