= Dave Bolton =

English RL coach and former GB international rugby league footballer (1937–2021)

Personal information
- Full name: David Ralph Bolton
- Born: 27 April 1937 Wigan district, England
- Died: 21 January 2021 (aged 83)

Playing information
- Position: Stand-off, Scrum-half
Club
Years	Team	Pld	T	G	FG	P
1954–64	Wigan	300	127	4	0	386
1965–70	Balmain	78	5	7	21	71
1968–69	Blackpool Borough	5
	Total	383	132	11	21	457
Representative
Years	Team	Pld	T	G	FG	P
1956–57	Lancashire	2
1958–63	Great Britain	23	9	0	0	3

Coaching information
Club
Years	Team	Gms	W	D	L	W%
1973–74	Parramatta Eels	44	11	0	33	25

David Ralph Bolton (27 April 1937 – 21 January 2021) was an English professional rugby league footballer who played in the 1950s, 1960s and 1970s, who later became a coach in Australia's NSWRFL premiership. An international representative for Great Britain whose usual position was in the halves, Bolton is one of a handful of Britons to win championships both in his home country and in Australia.

== Playing career ==
=== Britain ===
During the 1957–58 Northern Rugby Football League season Bolton played at stand-off in Wigan's 8–13 defeat by Oldham in the 1957 Lancashire Cup Final at Station Road, Swinton, on Saturday 19 October 1957. Later that season Bolton played stand-off in Wigan's 13–9 victory over Workington Town in the 1958 Challenge Cup Final at Wembley Stadium, London, on Saturday 10 May 1958, in front of a crowd of 66,109, He was selected to go on the 1958 Great Britain Lions tour and played in the first Ashes test against Australia, scoring a try, and in the 2nd suffered a broken collar bone after just 17 minutes. Bolton played at stand-off, and scored a try in the 30–13 victory over Hull F.C. in the 1959 Challenge Cup Final at Wembley on Saturday 9 May 1959, in front of a crowd of 79,811.

Bolton featured in the Wigan club's 1959–60 Northern Rugby Football League season Championship Final win. During the 1959–60 Kangaroo tour Bolton played for Great Britain at stand-off in all three Ashes series Test matches. Bolton was selected to go on the 1962 Great Britain Lions tour. He played at fullback in the 1963 Challenge Cup final for Wigan who lost 10-25 to Wakefield Trinity. During the 1963–64 Kangaroo tour Bolton again played for Great Britain at stand-off in the first and third Ashes series Test matches.

=== Australia ===
Bolton also played in Australia for the Sydney club Balmain. With them he reached the 1966 NSWRFL season's grand final against St George. Bolton played at number 7 in his sides loss against the all-conquering Dragons team of the era. As Balmain had gone through the first half of the 1966 season undefeated, they earned the right to play the Great Britain touring team. With Bolton playing no small part, Balmain defeated Great Britain. He featured in the 1969 season's Grand Final-winning Balmain team. This made him only the second Englishman to play in a grand final-winning team in Australia. Bolton retired from playing in 1970 after being unable to keep his first grade spot in 1970. He is often remembered as a prolific kicker of drop goals, at a time when they were worth 2 points. He was a great drop goal kicking asset to the club, he kicked 21 drop goals for Balmain during his era, some of them long range, and many of the drop goals were the difference between Balmain winning and losing. Bolton was inducted into the Balmain Tigers' Hall of Fame in 2005. Three years later, he was retrospectively conferred the Clive Churchill Medal for his performance in the 1969 Grand Final.

== Coaching ==
After retiring from coaching, Bolton remained in the Australian game as a coach. He coached Sydney club Parramatta for the 1973 and 1974 NSWRFL seasons. He went on to serve as assistant coach to Tim Sheens at Penrith in the mid-1980s. He also worked as a sports commentator and writer.

bolton died on 21 January 2021 at the age of 83, after suffering a long illness.
