= Independent Television Floodlit Trophy =

1955–56 Independent Television Floodlit Trophy
- Structure: Floodlit knockout championship
- Teams: 8
- Winners: Warrington
- Runners-up: Leigh

The Independent Television Floodlit Trophy or the Independent Television Floodlit Competition was a rugby league competition initiated and sponsored by ITV.

The competition was on a knock-out basis, between eight clubs, matches being played under floodlights on various London football grounds, and the second half of each game being shown live in the London Area only on Associated-Rediffusion's "Cavalcade of Sport" programme, which was aired between 8:30 and 9:30 PM.

The idea of playing sport under floodlights was still something of a novelty for most sports, and rugby league was no exception.

The second half of the matches were shown live in the London Area only and no one in the heartlands could watch. That competition only ran for this one season.

The tournament was won by Warrington, who defeated Leigh 43–18 at Loftus Road with Harry Bath, the second row forward, being the hero scoring 22 points from 2 tries and 8 goals. Each of the participating clubs received a payment of £400.

== Background ==
ITV was launched on 24 September 1955 and the new channel, wanting to make their mark from the start, were quick to add sport to the programmes.

At this time there were no ITV broadcasts to the North of England; the Winter Hill transmitter (between Chorley and Bolton) did not become operational until 3 May 1956 when Granada TV started broadcasting.

The competition appeared to have been a little rushed as, although the Rugby League Council had been approached and negotiations had been proceeding, an agreement to run a competition was only finalised on 29 August.

== The tournament ==
The tournament officially took place in October and November 1955, (the first match actually took place Wednesday 28 September) and the literature stated that the contestants comprised "the top four sides from each county", based on the previous seasons league positions. However, these rankings do not conform to the finishing positions in either the Championship or the county leagues from the 1954–55 season.

The first match to be played in Round 1 was between Wigan and Huddersfield, with Wigan suffering a defeat by 33–11.

== Competition and results ==
=== Round 1 – first round ===
The first round involved four matches and eight clubs, with all games being played in London. The two teams who won by the largest points margin progressed to the final.

Game No	Date	Home team	Score	Away team	Venue	Att	Ref
1	Wed 28 Sep 1955	Huddersfield	33–11	Wigan	Woolwich Stadium	500	
2	Wed 19 Oct 1955	Hunslet	20–46	Leigh	Loftus Road	1,500	
3	Wed 2 Nov 1955	Oldham	8–7	Featherstone Rovers	Loftus Road	500	
4	Wed 9 Nov 1955	Wakefield Trinity	9–33	Warrington	Loftus Road		

==== Table ====
Pos	Club	P	W	D	L	PF	PA	Pts	PD
1	Leigh	1	1	0	0	46	20	2	26
2	Warrington	1	1	0	0	33	9	2	24
3	Huddersfield	1	1	0	0	33	11	2	22
4	Oldham	1	1	0	0	8	7	2	1
5	Featherstone Rovers	1	0	0	1	7	8	0	-1
6	Wigan	1	0	0	1	11	33	0	-22
7	Wakefield Trinity	1	0	0	1	9	33	0	-24
8	Hunslet	1	0	0	1	20	46	0	-26

Pos = Finishing position P = Games played W = Wins D = Draw L = Lose
PF = Points scored PA = Points against Pts = League points PD = Points scored difference

=== Final ===
16 November 1955

Warrington	43 – 18	Leigh
Try: Bevan (2), Bath (2), McFarlane (2) Fraser, Naughton, Helme; Goal: Bath (8)		Try: Holden, Wilson, Gibson, Dickens; Goal: Ledgard (3)

Loftus Road, London
Attendance: 3,500
Referee: Ron Gelder (Wakefield)

FB	1	Eric Fraser
RW	2	Brian Bevan
RC	3	Len Horton
LC	4	Ally Naughton
LW	5	Bill Kilbride
SO	6	Eric Frodsham
SH	7	Gerry Helme
PR	8	Dan Naughton
HK	9	Tom McKinney
PR	10	Peter O'Toole
SR	11	Harry Bath
SR	12	Bob Ryan
LF	13	Bill McFarlane

FB	1	Jimmy Ledgard
RW	2	Keith Holden
RC	3	Bobby Wilson
LC	4	James Murphy
LW	5	Jack Gibson
SO	6	Albert Moore
SH	7	Tom O'Brien
PR	8	Bill Robinson
HK	9	Martin Dickens
PR	10	Stan Owen
SR	11	Peter Davies
SR	12	John Crook
LF	13	Joe McFarlane

== See also ==
- 1955–56 Northern Rugby Football League season
- 1955 Lancashire Cup
- 1955 Yorkshire Cup
- BBC2 Floodlit Trophy
- Rugby league county cups
