= Alvin Ackerley =

GB & England international rugby league footballer

Personal information
- Full name: Alvin Ackerley
- Born: fourth ¼ 1927 Dearham, Cumberland, England
- Died: December 1973 (aged 46)

Playing information
- Height: 5 ft 7 in (1.70 m)
- Weight: 13 st 7 lb (86 kg)
- Position: Hooker
Club
Years	Team	Pld	T	G	FG	P
1945	Barrow	1
1946–48	Workington Town	72
1948–59	Halifax	396	13	0	0	39
1959–62	Hull Kingston Rovers	100	3	0	0	9
	Total	569	16	0	0	48
Representative
Years	Team	Pld	T	G	FG	P
1946–59	Cumberland	16
1952–53	England	6	0	0	0	0
1952–58	Great Britain	2	0	0	0	0

Alvin Ackerley (1927 – 1973) was an English professional rugby league footballer who played in the 1940s, 1950s and 1960s. He played at representative level for Great Britain, England and Cumberland, and at club level for Barrow (trialist), Workington Town, Halifax (captain 1952–53 to 1955–56), and Hull Kingston Rovers, as a hooker.

== Background ==
Alvin Ackerley was born in Dearham, Cumberland, England, and he died aged 46.

== Playing career ==
=== Halifax ===
Ackerley played in his first cup final during the 1948–49 season, playing in Halifax's 0–12 defeat by Bradford Northern in the 1948–49 Challenge Cup Final at Wembley Stadium, London on Saturday 7 May 1949.

Ackerley played hooker in Halifax's 14–24 defeat by St. Helens in the Championship Final during the 1952–53 season.

During the 1953–54 season, Ackerley played in the 7–8 defeat by Warrington in the Championship Final. He also captained the side in the 4–4 draw with Warrington in the 1954 Challenge Cup Final at Wembley Stadium, London, on Saturday 24 April 1954, and also played in the replay (which Halifax lost 4–8) at Odsal Stadium, Bradford on Wednesday 5 May 1954, in front of a record crowd of 102,575 or more.

Ackerley played hooker, and was captain in Halifax's 22–14 victory over Hull in the 1954 Yorkshire Cup Final during the 1954–55 season at Headingley, Leeds on Saturday 23 October 1954.

During the 1955–56 season, he played in the 10–10 draw with Hull in the 1955 Yorkshire Cup Final at Headingley, Leeds on Saturday 22 October 1955, and the 7-0 victory in the replay at Odsal Stadium, Bradford on Wednesday 2 November 1955. He also played in the 9–10 defeat by Hull in the Championship Final, and played hooker in the 2–13 defeat by St. Helens in the 1955–56 Challenge Cup Final at Wembley Stadium, London on Saturday 28 April 1956.

Ackerley won the Yorkshire League with Halifax on four occasions, during the 1952–53 season, 1953–54 season, 1955–56 season and 1957–58 season.

=== Representative honours ===
Ackerley won caps for England while at Halifax in 1952 against Other Nationalities (2 matches), and Wales, in 1953 against France (2 matches), and Wales, and won caps for Great Britain while at Halifax in 1952 against Australia, and in 1958 against New Zealand.

Ackerley also won caps for Cumberland while at Halifax.

== Personal life ==
Alvin Ackerley was the older brother of the rugby league hooker who played in the 1960s for Workington Town and Bradford Northern; Terry Ackerley (birth registered first ¼ 1940 in Cockermouth district).

== Death and legacy ==
Ackerley died in December 1973, aged 46. He is a Halifax RLFC Hall Of Fame Inductee.
