= Brian Cooper (rugby league) =

English rugby league footballer (1931–2022)

Bryan Cooper
Personal information
- Full name: Bryan Cooper
- Born: 27 December 1931; Kingston upon Hull, Yorkshire, England
- Died: 5 February 2022 (aged 90)

Playing information
- Position: Centre
Club
Years	Team	Pld	T	G	FG	P
1950–60	Hull FC	106	36	0	0	108

Bryan Cooper (27 December 1931 – 5 February 2022) was an English professional rugby league footballer who played in the 1940s, 1950s and 1960s. He played at club level for Hull FC, usually as a centre. He was a one-club man who represented his home town club throughout the 1950s.

== Background ==
Cooper was born in Kingston upon Hull, East Riding of Yorkshire, England, and he worked as a joiner.

== Playing career ==
=== Championship final appearances ===
Cooper played at centre in Hull FC's 10–9 victory over Halifax in the Championship Final during the 1955–56 season at Maine Road, Manchester on Saturday 12 May 1956, in front of a crowd of 36,675, he did not play in the 14–15 defeat by Oldham in the Championship Final during the 1956–57 season at Odsal Stadium, Bradford on Saturday 16 May 1957, in front of a crowd of 62,233, and he played at centre, and scored a try in the 20–3 victory over Workington Town in Championship Final during the 1957–58 season at Odsal Stadium, Bradford on Saturday 17 May 1958, in front of a crowd of 57,699.

=== Challenge Cup Final appearances ===
Cooper played at centre in Hull FC's 13–30 defeat by Wigan in the 1958–59 Challenge Cup Final during the 1958–59 season at Wembley Stadium, London, in front of a crowd of 79,811.

=== Yorkshire Cup Final appearances ===
Cooper did not play for Hull F.C. in the 10–10 draw with Halifax in the 1955–56 Yorkshire Cup Final during the 1955–56 season at Headingley, Leeds on Saturday 22 October 1955, in front of a crowd of 23,520, and the 0–7 defeat by Halifax in the 1955–56 Yorkshire Cup Final replay during the 1955–56 season at Odsal Stadium, Bradford on Wednesday 2 November 1955, in front of a crowd of 14,000.

== Death ==
Cooper died on 5 February 2022, at the age of 90.
