= Norman Cherrington =

GB & England international rugby league footballer

Personal information
- Full name: Norman Cherrington
- Born: c. 1935 Wigan district, England
- Died: 2 December 2010 (aged 74-75) Wigan

Playing information
- Position: Wing, Second-row
Club
Years	Team	Pld	T	G	FG	P
1953–62	Wigan	257	80	0	0	240
1962–63	Huddersfield	8	2	0	0	6
1963–64	Warrington	15	5	0	0	15
	Total	280	87	0	0	261
Representative
Years	Team	Pld	T	G	FG	P
1955–57	Lancashire	5	4	0	0	12
1956	England	1	0	0	0	0
1960	Great Britain	1	0	0	0	0

Norman Cherrington (c. 1935 – 2 December 2010) was an English professional rugby league footballer who played in the 1950s and 1960s. He played at representative level for Great Britain and England, and at club level for All Saints' ARLFC and Wigan, as a wing or second-row.

== Background ==
Cherrington's birth was registered in Wigan district, England.

== Playing career ==
=== County League appearances ===
Norman Cherrington played in Wigan's victories in the Lancashire League during the 1958–59 season and 1961–62 season.

=== Challenge Cup Final appearances ===
Norman Cherrington played at second-row in Wigan's 13–9 victory over Workington Town in the 1958 Challenge Cup Final during the 1957–58 season at Wembley Stadium, London on Saturday 10 May 1958, in front of a crowd of 66,109, and played at second-row in the 30-13 victory over Hull F.C. in the 1959 Challenge Cup Final during the 1958–59 season at Wembley Stadium, London on Saturday 9 May 1959, in front of a crowd of 79,811.

=== County Cup Final appearances ===
Norman Cherrington played at second-row in Wigan's 8-13 defeat by Oldham in the 1957 Lancashire Cup Final during the 1957–58 season at Station Road, Swinton on Saturday 19 October 1957.

=== International honours ===
Norman Cherrington won a cap for England while at Wigan in 1956 against France, and won a cap for Great Britain while at Wigan in 1960 against France.

== Funeral ==
Norman Cherrington's funeral took place at Wigan Parish Church at 12.30pm on Tuesday 14 December 2010.
