= Ken Dean (rugby league) =

England international rugby league footballer

Personal information
- Full name: Kenneth Dean
- Born: 24 February 1927 Halifax, West Riding of Yorkshire, England
- Died: 20 September 2017 (aged 90)

Playing information
- Position: Stand-off
Club
Years	Team	Pld	T	G	FG	P
1948–60	Halifax	393	89	66	0	399
Representative
Years	Team	Pld	T	G	FG	P
1950–56	Yorkshire	11	3	0	0	9
1951–52	England	2	0	2	0	4

Kenneth Dean (24 February 1927 – 20 September 2017) was an English professional rugby league footballer who played in the 1940s, 1950s and 1960s. He played at representative level for England and Yorkshire, and at club level for Halifax, as a stand-off.

== Background ==
Dean was born in Halifax, West Riding of Yorkshire, England.

== Playing career ==
Dean made his début for Halifax on Saturday 6 November 1948, and played his last match for Halifax on Saturday 5 March 1960.

Dean played in Halifax's victories in the Yorkshire League during the 1952–53 season, 1953–54 season, 1955–56 season and 1957–58 season.

Dean played stand-off in Halifax's 4-4 draw with Warrington in the 1953–54 Challenge Cup Final during the 1953–54 season at Wembley Stadium, London on Saturday 24 April 1954, in front of a crowd of 81,841, played stand-off in the 4-8 defeat by Warrington in the 1953–54 Challenge Cup Final replay during the 1953–54 season at Odsal Stadium, Bradford on Wednesday 5 May 1954, in front of a record crowd of 102,575 or more, and played stand-off in the 2-13 defeat by St. Helens in the 1955–56 Challenge Cup Final during the 1955–56 season at Wembley Stadium, London on Saturday 28 April 1956, in front of a crowd of 79,341,

Dean played stand-off in Halifax's 22-14 victory over Hull F.C. in the 1954–55 Yorkshire Cup Final during the 1954–55 season at Headingley, Leeds on Saturday 23 October 1954, in front of a crowd of 25,949, played stand-off in the 10-10 draw with Hull F.C. in the 1955–56 Yorkshire Cup Final during the 1955–56 season at Headingley, Leeds on Saturday 22 October 1955, in front of a crowd of 23,520, and played stand-off in the 7-0 victory over Hull F.C. in the 1955–56 Yorkshire Cup Final replay during the 1955–56 season at Odsal Stadium, Bradford on Wednesday 2 November 1955, in front of a crowd of 14,000.

Dean's Testimonial match at Halifax took place in 1958.

=== Representative honours ===
Dean won caps for England while at Halifax in 1951 against Other Nationalities, and in 1952 against Other Nationalities.

Dean won caps for Yorkshire while at Halifax.

== Honoured at Halifax ==
Dean is a Halifax Hall Of Fame Inductee.

== Personal life ==
Dean was married to Winifred (née Hopkinson). They had two children; David, and Janet.

== Death ==
Dean died on 20 September 2017, aged 90. His funeral and cremation took place on 5 October 2017 at Park Wood Crematorium, Elland.
