= Bill Sayer =

GB international rugby league footballer

Personal information
- Full name: William Sayer
- Born: 22 June 1934; Wigan, England
- Died: 16 August 1989 (aged 55); Wigan, England

Playing information
- Position: Hooker
Club
Years	Team	Pld	T	G	FG	P
≤1954–54	Wigan Highfield
1954–65	Wigan	221	10	0	0	30
1965–70	St. Helens	147	26	0	0	78
	Total	368	36	0	0	108
Representative
Years	Team	Pld	T	G	FG	P
1962–68	Lancashire	6	0	0	0	0
1961–63	Great Britain	7	0	0	0	0

William Sayer (22 June 1934 – 16 August 1989), also known by the nickname "Sos", was an English professional rugby league footballer who played in the 1950s, 1960s and 1970s. He played at representative level for Great Britain, and at club level for Wigan Highfield, Wigan and St. Helens, as a hooker.

== Background ==
Sayer was born in Pemberton, Wigan, and was educated at Pemberton School.

== Playing career ==
=== Wigan ===
Sayer joined Wigan from Wigan Highfield in 1954 after being invited to play in three trial games – he was signed after just two. As well as showing early promise at Rugby League, Sayer was a useful Boxer and Soccer player. He made his Wigan début at Halifax on 4 December 1954 but had to wait until the latter part of 1956–57 for a regular place when he replaced Mather in the number nine shirt. For the next seven years, until changed by Colin Clarke, the shirt was virtually his own property.

Sayer played hooker in Wigan' 8–13 defeat by Oldham in the 1957 Lancashire Cup Final during the 1957–58 season at Station Road, Swinton on Saturday 19 October 1957.

Bill Sayer played hooker in Wigan's 13–9 victory over Workington Town in the 1958 Challenge Cup Final during the 1957–58 season at Wembley Stadium, London on Saturday 10 May 1958, in front of a crowd of 66,109, and played hooker in the 30–13 victory over Hull F.C. in the 1959 Challenge Cup Final during the 1958–59 season at Wembley Stadium, London on Saturday 9 May 1959, in front of a crowd of 79,811. Sayer's confrontation with Hull's Tommy Harris was much awaited. Each set of fans hailed their hooker as the best in the business. Sayer proved the best on the day as he won possession two-to-one, just as he had done at Wembley 12-months earlier. He scored a try in the Championship win over Wakefield in 1960 but two more Wembley appearances resulted in loser medals.

=== St Helens ===
In 1965 he started his second career with St Helens. He added to his club honours by collecting two Championship, and a third Challenge Cup-winners medal. The latter was particularly sweet for Sayer as it was in the 1966 win over Wigan. His last honour, 12 years after his first, was in the 1970 Championship over Leeds.

Sayer played hooker in St. Helens' 21–2 victory over Wigan in the 1966 Challenge Cup Final during the 1965–66 season at Wembley Stadium, London on Saturday 21 May 1966, in front of a crowd of 98,536. A week later, he played hooker in St. Helens' 35–12 victory over Halifax in the Championship Final at Station Road, Swinton on Saturday 28 May 1966, in front of a crowd of 30,165.

He played hooker in St. Helens 2–2 draw with Warrington in the 1967 Lancashire Cup Final during the 1967–68 season at Central Park, Wigan on Saturday 7 October 1967, played hooker in the 13–10 victory over Warrington in the 1967 Lancashire Cup Final replay during the 1967–68 season at Station Road, Swinton on Saturday 2 December 1967, and played hooker in the 30–2 victory over Oldham in the 1968 Lancashire Cup Final during the 1968–69 season at Central Park, Wigan on Friday 25 October 1968.

Sayer played hooker in St. Helens' 4–7 defeat by Wigan in the 1968–69 BBC2 Floodlit Trophy Final at Central Park, Wigan on Tuesday 17 December 1968.

=== International honours ===
A Lancashire County player, he won the first of his seven Great Britain caps against New Zealand at Leeds in September 1961. The following year he went on the 1962 Great Britain Lions tour of Australia. Sayer won seven caps for Great Britain while at Wigan in 1961 against New Zealand, in 1962 against France, Australia (3 matches), and New Zealand, and in 1963 against Australia.

== Post-playing ==
Sayer settled in Chorley after retiring from rugby league, where he ran a scrap metal business. He died in a car accident on 16 August 1989, aged 55.
