= Rees Thomas (rugby league) =

Welsh RL coach and former Wales international rugby league footballer

- Born: 31 August 1926 Maesteg, Glamorgan, Wales
- Died: March 1984 (aged 57)

Rugby union career
Senior career
Years	Team	Apps	(Points)
- Cornwall
- Maesteg RFC
- Royal Navy
- Devonport Services R.F.C.
- Rugby league career

Playing information
- Position: Scrum-half
Club
Years	Team	Pld	T	G	FG	P
1949–56	Swinton	204	14	0	0	42
1956–59	Wigan	102	5	1		17
1959–60	Swinton	15	1	0	0	3
	Total	321	20	1	0	62
Representative
Years	Team	Pld	T	G	FG	P
1959	Wales	1	0	0	0	0

Coaching information
Club
Years	Team	Gms	W	D	L	W%
1972–74	Swinton

Rees Thomas (31 August 1926 – March 1984) was a Welsh rugby union and professional rugby league footballer who played in the 1940s, 1950s and 1960s, and coached rugby league in the 1970s. He played representative level rugby union (RU) for Cornwall, and at club level for Maesteg RFC, Royal Navy and Devonport Services R.F.C., and representative level rugby league (RL) for Wales, and at club level for Swinton and Wigan, as a scrum-half and coached at club level for Swinton.

== Background ==
Rees Thomas was born in Maesteg, Glamorgan, Wales, he later served in the Royal Navy during World War II, and he died aged 57.

== Playing career ==
=== International honours ===
Rees Thomas won a cap for Wales (RL) while at Wigan in the 8–25 defeat by France at Stade des Minimes, Toulouse on Sunday 1 March 1959.

=== Challenge Cup Final appearances ===
Rees Thomas played scrum-half, and was man of the match winning the Lance Todd Trophy in Wigan's 13–9 victory over Workington Town in the 1958 Challenge Cup Final during the 1957–58 season at Wembley Stadium, London on Saturday 10 May 1958, in front of a crowd of 66,109, and played scrum-half in the 30–13 victory over Hull F.C. in the 1959 Challenge Cup Final during the 1958–59 season at Wembley Stadium, London on Saturday 9 May 1959, in front of a crowd of 79,811.

=== Notable tour matches ===
Rees Thomas played in Swinton's defeat to Australia in the 1952–53 Kangaroo tour of Great Britain and France match during the 1952–53 season.

=== Club career ===
Rees Thomas changed rugby football codes from rugby union to rugby league when he transferred from Devonport Services R.F.C. to Swinton, he made his début for Swinton against Dewsbury on Saturday 17 September 1949, and he played his last match (in his second spell) for Swinton against Widnes on Wednesday 27 April 1960, he transferred from Swinton to Wigan at the start of the 1956–57 season.

== Coaching career ==
Thomas was appointed as assistant coach to Albert Blan at Swinton in 1968. He was appointed head coach at Swinton in November 1972.
