= Bernard McGurrin =

English rugby league footballer (1933–2024)

Personal information
- Born: 12 July 1933; Wigan district, England
- Died: 20 December 2024 (aged 91)

Playing information
- Position: Centre, Stand-off, Loose forward
Club
Years	Team	Pld	T	G	FG	P
1953–54/55	Leigh	44	17	0	0	51
1955–59	Wigan	88	27	0	0	81
≥1959–≥61	Rochdale Hornets
	Total	132	44	0	0	132

Bernard McGurrin (12 July 1933 – 20 December 2024) was an English professional rugby league footballer who played in the 1950s and 1960s. He played at representative level for a combined Oldham & Rochdale Hornets team, and at club level for Leigh, Wigan, and the Rochdale Hornets (captain), as a centre, stand-off, or loose forward.

== Background ==
McGurrin was born in Wigan, Lancashire, England on 12 July 1933.

In 1955, he married Mary E. Sinclair in Wigan. They had children; the future rugby league footballer who played in the 1970s for Leigh (A-Team); Bernard McGurrin (born 1957), and Angela McGurrin (born 1960).

Bernard McGurrin died on 20 December 2024, at the age of 91.

== Playing career ==
=== Challenge Cup Final appearances ===
McGurrin played loose forward in Wigan's 13–9 victory over Workington Town in the 1958 Challenge Cup Final during the 1957–58 season at Wembley Stadium, London on Saturday 10 May 1958, in front of a crowd of 66,109.

=== County Cup Final appearances ===
McGurrin played loose forward in Wigan's 8–13 defeat by Oldham in the 1957–58 Lancashire Cup Final during the 1957–58 season at Station Road, Swinton on Saturday 19 October 1957, in front of a crowd of 42,497.

=== Notable tour matches ===
McGurrin played loose forward in a combined Oldham & Rochdale Hornets team in the 10–8 victory over New Zealand in the 1961 New Zealand rugby league tour of Great Britain and France match at Watersheddings, Oldham on Monday 4 September 1961, in front of a crowd of 8,795.

=== Club career ===
McGurrin made his début for Wigan he played centre in the 17–14 victory over Workington Town at Central Park, Wigan on Saturday 3 December 1955, he scored his first try for Wigan in the 21–8 victory over Widnes at Central Park, Wigan on Saturday 14 January 1956, he scored his last try for Wigan in the 22–5 victory over Wakefield Trinity at Central Park, Wigan on Saturday 3 January 1959, he played his last match for Wigan in the 22–5 victory over Wakefield Trinity at Central Park, Wigan on Saturday 3 January 1959.
