= Norman Herbert =

GB & England international rugby league footballer

Personal information
- Full name: Norman Herbert
- Born: c. 1934
- Died: 31 July 2022 (aged 88) Leigh, Greater Manchester, England

Playing information
- Position: Prop
Club
Years	Team	Pld	T	G	FG	P
≤1955–≥62	Workington Town
Representative
Years	Team	Pld	T	G	FG	P
1962	England	1	0	0	0	0
1961–62	Great Britain	6	2	0	0	6

Norman Herbert (c. 1934 – 31 July 2022) was an English former professional rugby league footballer who played in the 1960s. He played at representative level for Great Britain and England, and at club level for Workington Town, as a prop.

== Playing career ==
=== Workington Town ===
Herbert played at prop in Workington Town's 9–13 defeat by Wigan in the 1958 Challenge Cup Final during the 1957–58 season at Wembley Stadium, London on Saturday 10 May 1958.

=== International honours ===
Herbert won a cap for England while at Workington in 1962 against France, and won caps for Great Britain while at Workington in 1961 against New Zealand, and in 1962 against France, Australia (3 matches), and New Zealand.

== Personal life ==
Norman Herbert's son, Steve Herbert, played professional rugby league for Oldham, Barrow and Salford.
