= John Henderson (rugby league) =

GB & England international rugby league footballer

Personal information
- Full name: John Henderson
- Born: 1929; Maryport, England
- Died: February 2014 (aged 84); Huddersfield, England

Playing information
- Position: Prop, Second-row
Club
Years	Team	Pld	T	G	FG	P
1950–55	Workington Town	106	13
1955–58	Halifax	91	6	0	0	18
1958–59	York	50
	Total	247	19	0	0	18
Representative
Years	Team	Pld	T	G	FG	P
1951–58	Cumberland	8	0	0	0	0
1953	England	1	0	0	0	0
1954	Great Britain	0	0	0	0	0

John Henderson (1929 – 2014) was an English professional rugby league footballer who played in the 1950s. He played at representative level for Great Britain, England and Cumberland, and at club level for Workington Town, Halifax and York, as a prop, or second-row.

== Background ==
John Henderson was born in Maryport, Cumberland, England, and he died aged 84 in Huddersfield, West Yorkshire, England.

== Playing career ==
=== International honours ===
John Henderson won a cap for England while at Workington Town in 1953 against Wales, and was selected for the 1954 Great Britain Lions tour of Australia and New Zealand, playing in eleven non-Test matches, including the abandoned match against New South Wales.

=== County honours ===
John Henderson represented Cumberland.

=== Championship final appearances ===
John Henderson played in Halifax's 9-10 defeat by Hull F.C. in the Championship Final during the 1955-56 season at Maine Road, Manchester on Saturday 12 May 1956, having previously missed-out on Workington Town's victory in the Championship during the 1950-51 season.

=== County League appearances ===
John Henderson played in Halifax's victory in the Yorkshire League during the 1955–56 season.

=== Challenge Cup Final appearances ===
John Henderson played in Halifax's 2-13 defeat by St. Helens in the 1955–56 Challenge Cup Final during the 1955–56 season at Wembley Stadium, London on Saturday 28 April 1956, having previously missed-out on Workington Town's victory in the 1951–52 Challenge Cup during the 1951-52 season at Wembley Stadium. London on Saturday 19 April 1952.

=== County cup Final appearances ===
John Henderson played, and was sent off, in Halifax's 10-10 draw with Hull F.C. in the 1955 Yorkshire Cup Final during the 1955–56 season at Headingley, Leeds on Saturday 22 October 1955, consequently he did not play in Halifax's 7-0 victory over Hull F.C. in the 1955 Yorkshire Cup Final replay during the 1955–56 season at Odsal Stadium, Bradford on Wednesday 2 November 1955.

=== Club career ===
John Henderson was transferred from Workington Town to Halifax in 1955 for £2,000 (based on increases in average earnings, this would be approximately £113,900 in 2013).
