= Jack McLean (rugby, born 1923) =

New Zealand international rugby union & league player (1923–2005)

Personal information
- Full name: John Kenneth McLean
- Born: 3 October 1923 Thames, New Zealand
- Died: 30 July 2005 (aged 81) Thames, New Zealand

Playing information
- Height: 5 ft 10 in (178 cm)
- Weight: 13 st 0 lb (83 kg; 182 lb)

Rugby union
- Position: Wing
Club
Years	Team	Pld	T	G	FG	P
1946–47	Taumarunui
1948–50	Thames United
	Total	0	0	0	0	0
Representative
Years	Team	Pld	T	G	FG	P
1946–47	King Country	7	2	0	0	6
1948–50	Auckland
1947–49	New Zealand	2	0	0	0	0

Rugby league
- Position: Wing
Club
Years	Team	Pld	T	G	FG	P
1950–56	Bradford Northern	221	261	0	0	783

John Kenneth McLean (3 October 1923 – 30 July 2005) was a New Zealand rugby union and professional rugby league footballer who played in the 1940s and 1950s. He played two rugby union tests for New Zealand before switching codes and playing rugby league for Bradford Northern, as a wing.

== Background ==
Jack McLean was born in Thames, New Zealand, and he died aged 81 in Thames, New Zealand. He was a well known and loved local rugby icon but was also a teacher at Thames High School from 1956 to 1983. He was known as an avid reader and his athletic achievements are still on record in the Thames High School hall and the new gymnasium is named in his honour.

== Rugby union career ==
A wing three-quarter, McLean represented Auckland and King Country at a provincial level, and was a member of the New Zealand national side, the All Blacks, from 1947 to 1949. He played five matches for the All Blacks including two internationals, both of which were against Australia.

== Rugby league career ==
=== Bradford Northern ===
McLean was a member of Bradford Northern's table topping side and Championship finalists of 1951–52, and a Yorkshire Cup winner in 1953–54. He scored 63 tries in 46 games in the 1951–52 season, and is the top try scorer of all time with Bradford Northern (now named the Bradford Bulls).

=== Championship final appearances ===
McLean played on the wing in Bradford Northern's 6–13 defeat by Wigan in the Championship Final during the 1951–52 season at Leeds Road, Huddersfield on Saturday 10 May 1952.
