= 1959–60 Challenge Cup =

Rugby league competition

- Duration: 5 rounds
- Winners: Wakefield Trinity
- Runners-up: Hull F.C.
- Lance Todd Trophy: [Tommy Harris ]

The 1959–60 Challenge Cup was the 59th staging of rugby league's oldest knockout competition, the Challenge Cup.

== First round ==
Date	Team one	Score one	Team two	Score two
13 Feb	Barrow	2	Whitehaven	8
13 Feb	Batley	2	Keighley	5
13 Feb	Blackpool	2	Leigh	10
13 Feb	Castleford	4	Bradford Northern	8
13 Feb	Dewsbury	4	Swinton	23
13 Feb	Doncaster	0	Rochdale Hornets	15
13 Feb	Hunslet	5	Wigan	9
13 Feb	Leeds	8	Hull Kingston Rovers	5
13 Feb	Liverpool	3	Bramley	3
13 Feb	Oldham	13	Huddersfield	11
13 Feb	St Helens	10	Wakefield Trinity	15
13 Feb	Salford	0	Halifax	5
13 Feb	Walney	10	Lock Lane	5
13 Feb	Widnes	14	Warrington	0
13 Feb	Workington Town	0	Featherstone Rovers	15
13 Feb	York	0	Hull FC	2
17 Feb	Bramley	39	Liverpool	0

== Second round ==
Date	Team one	Score one	Team two	Score two
27 Feb	Halifax	10	Featherstone Rovers	16
27 Feb	Keighley	2	Hull FC	32
27 Feb	Leigh	8	Whitehaven	11
27 Feb	Oldham	55	Walney	4
27 Feb	Rochdale Hornets	0	Bramley	4
27 Feb	Swinton	13	Bradford Northern	9
27 Feb	Widnes	2	Wakefield Trinity	5
27 Feb	Wigan	14	Leeds	11

== Quarterfinals ==
Date	Team one	Score one	Team two	Score two
19 Mar	Hull FC	12	Wigan	8
19 Mar	Oldham	8	Bramley	2
19 Mar	Swinton	7	Featherstone Rovers	11
19 Mar	Whitehaven	10	Wakefield Trinity	21

== Semifinals ==
Date	Team one	Score one	Team two	Score two
09 Apr	Oldham	9	Hull FC	12
09 Apr	Wakefield Trinity	11	Featherstone Rovers	2

== Final ==
The 1959–60 Challenge Cup tournament ended in a final between Wakefield Trinity and Hull F.C. The match was played at Wembley Stadium before a crowd of 79,773, with Wakefield Trinity winning 38 – 5. Despite being on the losing team, Hull's hooker, Tommy Harris was awarded the Lance Todd Trophy for his man-of-the-match performance.

Neil Fox of Wakefield Trinity scored a Cup final record 20 points (two tries and seven goals) in the final for Wakefield, a feat that would not be repeated for another 39 years 1999.

14 May 1960

Wakefield Trinity	38 – 5	Hull
Tries: Smith, Skene 2, Fox 2, Rollin, Holliday 2 Goals: Fox 7		Tries: Cowan; Goals: Evans

Wembley, London
Attendance: 79,773
Referee: Half time 7-5
Player of the Match: Harris

1	Gerry Round
2	Fred Smith
3	Alan Skene
4	Neil Fox
5	John Etty
6	Ken Rollin
7	Keith Holliday
8	Jack Wilkinson
9	Geoff Oakes
10	Don Vines
11	Les Chamberlain
12	Albert Firth
13	Derek Turner (c)
Coach:
Ken Traill

1	Jack Kershaw
2	Gordon Harrison
3	Stan Cowan
4	Nan Halafihi
5	Dave Johnson
6	Frank Broadhurst
7	Tommy Finn
8	Michael Scott
9	Tommy Harris
10	Sam Evans
11	Tom Sutton
12	Mike Smith
13	Johnny Whiteley (c)
Coach:
Roy Francis
