= Tommy Finn =

English rugby league footballer (1934–2021)

Personal information
- Full name: Thomas Finn
- Born: 16 February 1934; St Helens, England
- Died: 21 May 2021 (aged 87)

Playing information
- Position: Scrum-half
Club
Years	Team	Pld	T	G	FG	P
1951–52	St Helens R.F.C.	8	1	0	0	3
1954–68	Hull FC	375	132	0	0	396
	Total	383	133	0	0	399

Thomas Finn (16 February 1934 – 21 May 2021) was a professional rugby league footballer who played in the 1950s and 1960s. He played at club level for St Helens R.F.C., and Hull FC, as a scrum-half.

== Playing career ==
=== Hull FC ===
Tommy Finn made his debut for Hull FC in December 1954.

=== Challenge Cup Final appearances ===
He played scrum-half, and scored a try in Hull FC's 13-30 defeat by Wigan in the 1958–59 Challenge Cup Final during the 1958–59 season at Wembley Stadium, London on Saturday 9 May 1959, in front of a crowd of 79,811, and played scrum-half in the 5-38 defeat by Wakefield Trinity in the 1959–60 Challenge Cup Final during the 1959–60 season at Wembley Stadium, London on Saturday 14 May 1960, in front of a crowd of 79,773.
