= Derrick Schofield =

GB & England international rugby league footballer

Personal information
- Born: 4 February 1928; Rochdale, England
- Died: 25 August 1999 (aged 71)

Playing information
- Position: Wing, Second-row
Club
Years	Team	Pld	T	G	FG	P
1949–53	Rochdale Hornets
1953–56	Halifax	111	32	10	0	116
1956–58	Castleford	37	3	4	0	17
	Rochdale Hornets
	Dewsbury
	Total	148	35	14	0	133
Representative
Years	Team	Pld	T	G	FG	P
1952–53	Lancashire	2	0	1	0	2
1952–53	England	2	0	0	0	0
1955	Great Britain	2	0	0	0	0

Derrick Schofield (4 February 1928 – 25 August 1999) was an English professional rugby league footballer who played in the 1940s and 1950s. He played at representative level for Great Britain, England and Lancashire, and at club level for Rochdale Hornets (two spells), Halifax, Castleford and Dewsbury, as a wing, or second-row.

== Playing career ==
Born in Rochdale, Lancashire, Schofield began his professional rugby league career with his hometown club Rochdale Hornets in 1949. He played as a winger during his early career, but switched to second-row on the suggestion of Hornets coach Cec Fifield.

Schofield played at second-row in Halifax's 4-4 draw with Warrington in the 1954 Challenge Cup Final during the 1953–54 season at Wembley Stadium, London on Saturday 24 April 1954, in front of a crowd of 81,841, and played at second-row in the 4-8 defeat by Warrington in the 1954 Challenge Cup Final replay during the 1953–54 season at Odsal Stadium, Bradford on Wednesday 5 May 1954, in front of a record crowd of 102,575 or more.

=== International honours ===
Schofield won caps for England while at Rochdale Hornets in 1952 against Wales, in 1953 against France, and won a cap for Great Britain while at Halifax in 1955 against New Zealand.

Schofield also represented Great Britain while at Halifax between 1952 and 1956 against France (1 non-Test match).
