= Thomas Lynch (rugby, born 1927) =

NZ international rugby union & league player (1927–2006)

Tom Lynch
- Born: Thomas William Lynch; 20 July 1927 Naseby, New Zealand
- Died: 29 December 2006 (aged 79) Geraldine, New Zealand
- Height: 1.78 m (5 ft 10 in)
- Weight: 84 kg (13 st 3 lb)
- School: Alexandra District High School
- Notable relative: Tom Lynch (father)

Rugby union career
- Position: Second five-eighth
Provincial / State sides
Years	Team	Apps	(Points)
1947–49	Otago	7	
1950–51	Canterbury	8	
International career
Years	Team	Apps	(Points)
1951	New Zealand	3	(9)
- Rugby league career

Playing information
- Position: Centre
Club
Years	Team	Pld	T	G	FG	P
1951–56	Halifax	188	111	5	4	351
Representative
Years	Team	Pld	T	G	FG	P
	Other Nationalities	4

Thomas William Lynch (20 July 1927 – 29 December 2006) was a New Zealand rugby union and rugby league footballer. He played three rugby union internationals for New Zealand in 1951, before switching codes and joining English club Halifax, for whom he made 188 appearances between 1951 and 1956.

== Rugby union ==
A second five-eighth, Lynch represented Otago and Canterbury at a provincial level, and was a member of the New Zealand national side, the All Blacks, in 1951. He played ten matches for the All Blacks on their tour of Australia that year, including three internationals, scoring 27 points in all.

== Rugby league ==
In November 1951, Lynch accepted a contract to play professional rugby league for the Halifax club in England. At the time, his signing fee of £5000 was a record for a New Zealand player paid by an English club. He played for Halifax until 1956, making 188 appearances, scoring 112 tries and nine goals.

=== Challenge Cup final appearances ===
Lynch played centre in Halifax's 4–all draw with Warrington in the 1954 Challenge Cup final during the 1953–54 season at Wembley Stadium, London on Saturday 24 April 1954, in front of a crowd of 81,841. He also played at centre in the 4–8 defeat by Warrington in the replay at Odsal Stadium, Bradford on Wednesday 5 May 1954, in front of a record crowd of 102,575 or more.

He later played in the 2–13 defeat by St. Helens in the 1956 Challenge Cup final during the 1955–56 season at Wembley Stadium on Saturday 28 April 1956.

=== International honours ===
Lynch won four caps for Other Nationalities while at Halifax.

=== Legacy ===
Lynch's testimonial match at Halifax took place in 1956. He is a Halifax Hall of Fame inductee.

== Death ==
Lynch died in Geraldine on 29 December 2006.
