= Keith Bowman =

American materials scientist

Keith John Bowman
- Education: University of Michigan (PhD) Case Western Reserve University (B.S.)
- Scientific career
- Fields: Materials science Ceramics material processing
- Workplaces: University of Maryland, Baltimore County
- Thesis: The Effects of Thin Anodic Films on Cyclic Deformation of Tungsten (1987)
- Website: coeit.umbc.edu/deans-office-team/person/tm79254/

Keith John Bowman is a materials scientist and dean of the University of Maryland, Baltimore County College of Engineering and Information Technology, working to advance research benefiting society and elevating student educational success. He is a Fellow of The American Ceramic Society. Bowman has worked extensively to advance diversity, equity, and inclusion across engineering disciplines and the science, technology, engineering, and math (STEM) pipeline. He is a member of 500 Queer Scientists. He is internationally recognized for his research on the property anisotropy and preferred orientation in ceramics and ceramic composites.

== Education ==
Bowman received his B.S. and M.S. degrees in materials science from the Case Western Reserve University in 1981 and 1983 respectively. He moved to the University of Michigan for his Ph.D. degree in materials science in which he received 1987.

== Research and career ==
Bowman joined University of Maryland, Baltimore County (UMBC) College of Engineering and Information Technology (COEIT) as the dean in 2017. During his tenure at UMBC, its online master's degree in information systems has regularly been ranked by U.S. News & World Report as one of the best in the United States. Upon completion of his graduate work, Bowman moved to Purdue where he was a Professor in the School of Materials Engineering at from 1988 to 2011. While at Purdue he advance from Assistant to Associate to Full Profession and head numerous leadership roles including Head of Materials Engineering. Bowman's research group made extensive advances to understanding property anisotropy, preferred orientation, and processing effects and in a wide range of materials including ceramics, metals, and composites. The group focused on mechanical and electromechanical properties. He moved to the Illinois Institute of Technology (IIT) in 2011 where he served as the Chair of the Department of Mechanical, Materials and Aerospace Engineering (MMAE) and was invested as the inaugural Duchossois Leadership Professor in the IIT Armour College of Engineering in 2012. He moved to San Francisco State University in 2015, where he was the dean of the College of Science and Engineering. While at San Francisco State University he was the internal advisory chair to the SF BUILD project to enhancing the diversity of the NIH-funded workforce funded by the National Institutes of Health. He has served on the board of directors for the American Ceramic Society, chair of ACerS Diversity & Inclusion Subcommittee, chair of the Multi Society Diversity Council, and the University of Michigan Materials Science and Engineering External Advisory Board.

== Awards and recognition ==
- 1992 and 1995 Purdue, MSE Best Teaching Award
- 1995 Purdue, Charles Murphy Undergraduate Teaching Award
- 1996 and 2002 Alexander von Humboldt Research Award for Foreign Scholars
- 2000 Fellow of The American Ceramic Society
- 2003 Purdue Book of Great Teachers
- 2007 Purdue College of Engineering Mentoring Award
- 2012 Illinois Institute of Technology, Duchossois Leadership Professor in the IIT Armour College of Engineering
