= Jack Wilkinson (rugby league) =

GB & England international rugby league footballer

Personal information
- Born: 16 August 1930 Halifax, England
- Died: March 1992 (aged 61) Halifax, England

Playing information
- Height: 5 ft 11 in (1.80 m)
- Weight: 15 st 7 lb (98 kg)
- Position: Prop
Club
Years	Team	Pld	T	G	FG	P
1948–59	Halifax	252	22	0	0	66
1959–63	Wakefield Trinity	151	10	0	0	30
1963	Bradford Northern	12	0	0	0	0
	Total	415	32	0	0	96
Representative
Years	Team	Pld	T	G	FG	P
195?–6?	Yorkshire	10
1956–58	Rugby League XIII	2	1			3
1953–55	England	2	0	0	0	0
1954–62	Great Britain	13	4	0	0	12

Coaching information
Club
Years	Team	Gms	W	D	L	W%
1963	Bradford Northern

Jack Wilkinson (16 August 1930 – 1992) was an English professional rugby league footballer who played in the 1940s, 1950s and 1960s, and coached in the 1960s. A Halifax and Wakefield Trinity Hall of Fame inductee, he was a Great Britain and England international forward. Wilkinson also represented Yorkshire, and ended his career as captain-coach of Bradford Northern.

== Background ==
Jack Wilkinson as born in Halifax, West Riding of Yorkshire, England, he was a classmate of wrestler Shirley "Big Daddy" Crabtree. He died in March 1992, aged 61.

== Playing career ==
=== Halifax ===
Wilkinson played at prop in Halifax's 4–4 draw with Warrington in the 1953–54 Challenge Cup Final during the 1953–54 season at Wembley Stadium, London on Saturday 24 April 1954, in front of a crowd of 81,841. In the subsequent replay he played at prop in the 4–8 loss to Warrington which attracted a record crowd of 102,575, or more, to Odsal Stadium, Bradford on Wednesday 5 May 1954.

Wilkinson played in the 2–13 defeat by St. Helens in the 1955–56 Challenge Cup Final during the 1955–56 season at Wembley Stadium, London on Saturday 28 April 1956. Wilkinson's Testimonial match at Halifax took place in 1958.

=== Wakefield Trinity ===
Jack Wilkinson joined Wakefield Trinity from Halifax in 1959 for £4,500 (based on increases in average earnings, this would be approximately £207,900 in 2013). During the 1959–60 season Wilkinson played at prop in Wakefield Trinity's 38–5 victory over Hull F.C. in the 1959–60 Challenge Cup Final during the 1959–60 season at Wembley Stadium, London on Saturday 14 May 1960, in front of a crowd of 79,773. He then played in the 3–27 loss against Wigan in the Rugby Football League Championship Final at Odsal Stadium, Bradford on Saturday, 21 May 1960.

During the 1960–61 season Wilkinson played for Wakefield Trinity at prop in their victory over Huddersfield in the 1960–61 Yorkshire Cup Final at Headingley, Leeds on Saturday 29 October 1960, The following year he again played at prop in Wakefield's victory in the 1961 Yorkshire Cup Final, this time over Leeds. Wilkinson played at prop in the 12–6 victory over Huddersfield in the 1961–62 Challenge Cup Final during the 1961–62 season at Wembley Stadium, London on Saturday 12 May 1962, in front of a crowd of 81,263, and played at prop in the 25–10 victory over Wigan in the 1962–63 Challenge Cup Final during the 1962–63 season at Wembley Stadium, London on Saturday 11 May 1963, in front of a crowd of 84,492.

=== Bradford Northern ===
Jack Wilkinson moved to Bradford Northern, as captain-coach in 1963. That year the film This Sporting Life which starred Richard Harris was released and in it Wilkinson is clearly visible as a rugby player in several scenes.

=== Representative honours ===
Wilkinson won caps for Great Britain while at Halifax between 1952 and 1956 against France (1 non-Test match). Wilkinson also represented England while at Halifax in 1953 against Other Nationalities.

Wilkinson won caps for Great Britain while at Halifax in 1954 against Australia and New Zealand (2 matches). He also played for Rugby League XIII while at Halifax against France. Wilkinson played for England in 1955 against Other Nationalities. He won caps for Great Britain in 1955 against New Zealand (3 matches). Auckland defeated Great Britain 5-4 at Carlaw Park in a rough match which resulted in Wilkinson and Nat Silcock being sent off.

Wilkinson was selected for Yorkshire County XIII while at Halifax in 1959.

During the 1959–60 Kangaroo tour Wilkinson was selected to play for Great Britain at prop in their victory in the third and deciding Ashes test.

Wilkinson was selected for Yorkshire County XIII while at Wakefield Trinity.

Wilkinson helped Great Britain to victory in the 1960 World Cup, playing in all three games, and scoring a try in the 33–7 victory over France on Saturday 1 October 1960 at Station Road, Swinton.
