= Johnny Whiteley =

English rugby league player and coach (1930–2022)

Personal information
- Full name: John William Whiteley
- Born: 20 November 1930 Kingston upon Hull, England
- Died: 13 February 2022 (aged 91) England

Playing information
- Position: Loose forward, Second-row
Club
Years	Team	Pld	T	G	FG	P
1950–65	Hull FC	417	156	2	0	472
Representative
Years	Team	Pld	T	G	FG	P
1952–61	Yorkshire	11	4	0	0	12
1953	England	1	0	0	0	0
1957–62	Great Britain	15	2	0	0	6

Coaching information
Club
Years	Team	Gms	W	D	L	W%
1965–70	Hull FC
1970–72	Hull Kingston Rovers
	Total	0	0	0	0
Representative
Years	Team	Gms	W	D	L	W%
1970	Great Britain	10	8	0	2	80
1970–82	Yorkshire
1981	England	3	2	0	1	67
1980–82	Great Britain	9	2	1	6	22

John William Whiteley MBE (20 November 1930 – 13 February 2022) was an English professional rugby league footballer and coach. He played his entire club career with Hull FC making over 400 appearances between 1950 and 1965. He also represented Great Britain at international level, winning the Rugby League World Cup with the team in 1954 and 1960.

Whiteley began his coaching career while still playing at Hull in 1963 and remained in the role after retiring as player. He resigned in 1970 and joined Hull Kingston Rovers, where he coached until 1972. He also coached the Great Britain national team on two occasions. In recognition of his achievements in the sport, he was inducted into the Rugby Football League Hall of Fame in 2018.

== Early life ==
Whiteley was born on 20 November 1930. He grew up in Hull during the Second World War, during which his house was hit by a bomb in the Hull Blitz. He began playing rugby league for Hull Boys' Club when the club reformed in 1946. Like many of his teammates, he agreed not to sign for a professional club until the completion of his National Service.

== Playing career ==
=== Hull ===
After some impressive performances in trial matches, Whiteley signed for Hull in December 1950. Rather than offering him a signing-on fee, Whiteley was promised a place in the squad the following game. He made his debut on 23 December 1950 in a 19–11 win against York at Clarence Street.

He played in three successive Yorkshire Cup finals for Hull between 1953 and 1955, but was on the losing side on each occasion.

His first honours with the club came in the 1955–56 season, with Hull winning the league championship when Colin Hutton kicked a last-minute penalty in the playoff final against Halifax RLFC at Maine Road, Manchester. Hull won the European Club championship in 1957.

In 1957, Whiteley became Hull's captain, and lead them to the Championship playoffs again in the 1957–58 season, winning against Workington Town. In the following season, Whiteley played in Hull's first appearance at Wembley in the 1958–59 Challenge Cup Final, but lost 13–30 to Wigan. Whiteley also played in the 1959–60 Challenge Cup Final, but Hull lost again, this time to Wakefield Trinity.

Whiteley became a player-coach at Hull in 1963, before retiring as a player in 1965. He played 15 seasons for Hull making 417 appearances and scoring 156 tries and 2 goals for at total of 472 points. In his time with Hull, he was never dropped.

=== Representative honours ===
In 1953 he played his first match for England against France in Paris, winning 13–15.

Whiteley was selected for Great Britain squad while at Hull for the 1954 Rugby League World Cup in France. However he did not participate in any of the four matches, with Dave Valentine playing as loose forward in all four matches.

Whiteley represented the Rest of the World in the 11–20 defeat by Australia at Sydney Cricket Ground on 29 June 1957. Then followed a trip to South Africa in which the British and French teams staged a series of exhibition matches for the promotion of the game. Johnny was a member of the 1958 Great Britain touring squad that retained the Ashes, and he scored a try in the 40–17 third Test success in Sydney.

Whiteley was a member of the last Great Britain team to beat Australia on home soil in the 1959 test series, scoring the try that beat the Aussies that year.

He scored a match-winning try against the Aussies in the last few minutes which gave Great Britain the 1960 Ashes.

He was a member of the 1962 Great Britain team which won the Ashes in Australia.

== Coaching career ==
Whiteley carried on coaching at Hull after his last appearance as a player. When Roy Francis retired as Hull coach in 1965, Whiteley, now himself retired with an injured shoulder, took over, but resigned in 1970.

Whiteley moved across the river to Hull Kingston Rovers as coach in 1970 and stayed until 1972 when he left due to conflict with the Hull KR Board of Directors.

He coached the G.B. squad that toured Australia in 1970 and they were the last to win the Ashes in Australia. He left Hull on his return to coach Hull Kingston Rovers until leaving them in 1972. He then carried on coaching the Yorkshire Origin side for 12 years.

He was then recalled to coach Great Britain in 1980 for two years.

== After rugby ==
After his career finished, Whiteley ran a successful Working Men's Club (Eureka) in West Hull from which he also ran a gym. He later set up the West Hull amateur rugby league club.

Whiteley was inducted into the Hull F.C. Hall of Fame in 1992, and joined the Rugby Football League Roll of Honour in November 2004, having been nominated by both Hull and Hull Kingston Rovers. He was made an MBE for services to rugby league and the community in the 2006 New Year Honours list. He was awarded an Honorary Degree from Hull University in 2012. In 2018 he was inducted into the Rugby Football League Hall of Fame.

He died on 13 February 2022, at the age of 91.

== Honours and awards ==
Club

- RFL Championship (2): 1955–56, 1957–58
- European Club Championship (1): 1956–57

International

- Rugby League World Cup (2): 1954, 1960

Individual

- Member of the Order of the British Empire (MBE), 2005
- Honorary doctorate from the University of Hull, 2012
- Rugby Football League Hall of Fame inductee, 2018
