= Stan Kielty =

England international rugby league footballer

Personal information
- Born: 20 July 1925 Castleford, England
- Died: 31 December 2008 (aged 83) Halifax, England

Playing information
- Position: Scrum-half
Club
Years	Team	Pld	T	G	FG	P
1944–46	Wakefield Trinity	11	1	0	0	3
1946–58	Halifax	482	73	7	0	233
	Total	493	74	7	0	236
Representative
Years	Team	Pld	T	G	FG	P
	Yorkshire	11	0	0	0	0
1953	England	3	1	0	0	3

Stanley "Stan" Kielty (20 July 1925 – 31 December 2008) was an English rugby league footballer who played in the 1940s and 1950s, and coached in the 1960s. He played at representative level for England and Yorkshire, and at club level for Wakefield Trinity, and Halifax, as a scrum-half.

Kielty holds Halifax's 'most games in a career' record, which stands at 482 appearances between 1946 and 1958. He played the majority of his career at scrum-half, and formed a formidable halves pairing with stand-off Ken Dean. On the field the 'Dean and Kielty' duo became renowned for their symbiotic creative partnerships in the game, while off the field Stan and Ken remained good friends years after their playing days came to an end.

== Background ==
Kielty's birth was registered in Castleford, West Riding of Yorkshire, England, and he died aged 83 in Halifax, West Yorkshire, England.

== Playing career ==
=== Challenge Cup Final appearances ===
Kielty played scrum-half in Halifax's 4-4 draw with Warrington in the 1954 Challenge Cup Final during the 1953–54 season at Wembley Stadium, London on Saturday 24 April 1954, in front of a crowd of 81,841, and played scrum-half in the 4-8 defeat by Warrington in the 1954 Challenge Cup Final replay during the 1953–54 season at Odsal Stadium, Bradford on Wednesday 5 May 1954, in front of a record crowd of 102,575 or more.

=== Club career ===
Kielty made his début for Wakefield Trinity during the 1944–45 season, and he played his last match for Wakefield Trinity during the 1946–47 season.

=== Testimonial match ===
Kielty's Testimonial match at Halifax took place in 1955.

=== Representative honours ===
Kielty won caps for England while at Halifax in 1953 against Wales, France, and Other Nationalities.

Kielty won caps for Yorkshire while at Halifax.

== Honoured at Halifax ==
Kielty is a Halifax Hall of Fame Inductee.

== Honoured by Arriva Yorkshire ==
Arriva Yorkshire honoured 13 rugby league footballers on Thursday 20 August 2009, at a ceremony at The Jungle, the home of the Castleford Tigers. A fleet of new buses were named after the 'Arriva Yorkshire Rugby League Dream Team'. Members of the public nominated the best ever rugby league footballers to have played in West Yorkshire, supported by local rugby league journalists; James Deighton from BBC Leeds, and Tim Butcher, editor of Rugby League World. The 'Arriva Yorkshire Rugby League Dream Team' is; Trevor Foster MBE, Neil Fox MBE, Albert Goldthorpe, Alan Hardisty, Stan Kielty, Lewis Jones, Roger Millward MBE, Malcolm Reilly, Garry Schofield, Keith Senior, David Topliss, Dave Valentine and Adrian Vowles.

== Genealogical information ==
Kielty was the younger brother of John Kielty, Michael Kielty (birth registered during fourth ¼ 1915 in Pontefract district death registered during fourth ¼ 1915 (aged 0) in Pontefract district), the hooker for Wakefield Trinity; Norman C. Kielty, and the older brother of Catherine Kielty, Michael Kielty (birth registered during first ¼ 1929 in Pontefract district), and Terence Kielty.
