= 1959–60 Northern Rugby Football League season =

- League: Northern Rugby Football League
- Champions: Wigan
- League Leaders: St. Helens
- Top point-scorer: Neil Fox 453
- Top try-scorer: Tom van Vollenhoven 54

The 1959–60 Rugby Football League season was the 65th season of rugby league football played in England. The championship, which involved thirty teams, started in August 1959 and culminated in a finals play-off series in May 1960 which resulted in a championship final between Wigan and Wakefield Trinity.

== Season summary ==
- League Champions: Wigan (27–3 v Wakefield Trinity)
- Challenge Cup Winners: Wakefield Trinity (38–5 v Hull)

A number of clubs complained to the Rugby Football League over BBC televising rugby league matches live on TV, stating that it was affecting attendances.

St. Helens won the Lancashire League, and Wakefield Trinity won the Yorkshire League.

== Championship ==
Final Standings

	Team	Pld	W	D	L	PF	PA	PD	Pts
1	St. Helens	38	34	1	3	947	343	+604	69
2	Wakefield Trinity	38	32	0	6	831	348	+483	64
3	Hull	38	28	1	9	758	474	+284	57
4	Wigan	38	27	2	9	828	390	+438	56
5	Featherstone Rovers	38	27	0	11	730	437	+293	54
6	Whitehaven	38	22	3	13	594	533	+61	47
7	Warrington	38	22	2	14	650	482	+168	46
8	Swinton	38	22	2	14	654	503	+151	46
9	Oldham	38	22	1	15	744	461	+283	45
10	Hunslet	38	21	3	14	595	488	+107	45
11	Leigh	38	20	4	14	600	502	+98	44
12	Huddersfield	38	21	1	16	603	510	+93	43
13	Hull Kingston Rovers	38	20	1	17	517	575	−58	41
14	Leeds	38	20	0	18	641	573	+68	40
15	Salford	38	19	2	17	629	583	+46	40
16	Batley	38	18	3	17	476	506	−30	39
17	Widnes	38	18	1	19	598	519	+79	37
18	Castleford	38	18	0	20	561	630	−69	36
19	Workington Town	38	18	0	20	448	530	−82	36
20	Keighley	38	17	1	20	575	659	−84	35
21	York	38	17	0	21	579	698	−119	34
22	Halifax	38	15	2	21	627	561	+66	32
23	Rochdale Hornets	38	15	0	23	435	519	−84	30
24	Barrow	38	13	1	24	422	562	−140	27
25	Bramley	38	10	2	26	393	673	−280	22
26	Bradford Northern	38	9	3	26	450	645	−195	21
27	Liverpool City	38	9	3	26	383	720	−337	21
28	Blackpool Borough	38	9	1	28	400	819	−419	19
29	Dewsbury	38	4	1	33	337	982	−645	9
30	Doncaster	38	2	1	35	284	1,084	−800	5

=== Play-offs ===
Semi-finals
1	St. Helens	9
4	Wigan	19
2	Wakefield Trinity	24
3	Hull	4

Championship final
Wigan	27
Wakefield Trinity	3

==== Final ====
The Championship Final was played between Joe Egan' Wigan outfit against Wakefield Trinity at 3 o'clock on a warm afternoon on Saturday, 21 May 1960 at Odsal Stadium, Bradford. A crowd of 83,190 turned out for the game which was refereed by Eric Clay (Leeds).

21 May 1960

Wigan	27 – 3	Wakefield Trinity
Tries: Boston (2), Ashton (2), Sayer; Goals: Griffiths (6)		Tries: Smith

Odsal Stadium, Bradford
Attendance: 83,190
Referee: Eric Clay (Rothwell)

Wigan	Number	Wakefield Trinity
	Teams	
Fred Griffiths	1	Gerry Round
Frank Halliwell	2	Fred Smith
Billy Boston	3	Alan Skene
Keith Holden	4	Neil Fox
Syd Fenton	5	John Etty
Eric Ashton	6	Ken Rollin
Dave Bolton	7	Keith Holliday
John Barton	8	Jack Wilkinson
Bill Sayer	9	Geoff Oakes
Frank Collier	10	Don Vines
Brian McTigue	11	Albert Firth
Geoff Lyon	12	Les Chamberlain
Roy Evans	13	Derek Turner
Joe Egan	Coach	Ken Traill

== Challenge Cup ==
The 1959–60 Challenge Cup tournament ended in a final between Wakefield Trinity and Hull F.C. The match was played at Wembley Stadium before a crowd of 79,773, with Wakefield Trinity winning 38 – 5. Despite being on the losing team, Hull's hooker, Tommy Harris was awarded the Lance Todd Trophy for his man-of-the-match performance.

Neil Fox of Wakefield Trinity scored a Cup Final record 20 points (two tries and seven goals) in the final for Wakefield, a feat that would not be repeated for another 39 years 1999.

== County cups ==
Warrington beat St. Helens 5–4 to win the Lancashire Cup, and Featherstone Rovers beat Hull F.C. 15–14 to win the Yorkshire Cup.

== Kangaroo Tour ==
September until December also saw the appearance of the Australian team in England on their 1959–60 Kangaroo Tour. Other than the three test Ashes series against Great Britain (won 2–1 by Australia), the Kangaroos played 21 matches against club and county representative sides.

The Kangaroos were coached by "The Little Master" Clive Churchill and were captained by Welsh born Balmain Tigers fullback Keith Barnes.

As of 2017, this remains the last time that Great Britain or England won The Ashes on home soil.

== Sources ==
- "1959-1960 Northern Rugby Football League". Cherryandwhite.co.uk. Archived from the original on 11 January 2020.
