= Tommy Harris (rugby) =

GB & Wales international rugby league footballer

Personal information
- Full name: Percival Thomas Harris
- Born: 5 June 1927 Crumlin, Wales
- Died: 27 September 2006 (aged 79) York, England

Playing information

Rugby union
- Position: hooker
Club
Years	Team	Pld	T	G	FG	P
19??–49	Newbridge

Rugby league
- Position: Hooker
Club
Years	Team	Pld	T	G	FG	P
1950–62	Hull FC	444	56	2	0	172
Representative
Years	Team	Pld	T	G	FG	P
1952–59	Wales	8	2	0	0	6
1954–60	Great Britain	25	2	0	0	6
1954–58	GB tour games	22	9	0	0	15
1954	GB tour trial	1	0	0	0	0

Coaching information
Club
Years	Team	Gms	W	D	L	W%
1962–73	York

Percival Thomas Harris (5 June 1927 – 27 September 2006), also known by the nickname of "Bomber", was a Welsh rugby union and World Cup winning professional rugby league footballer who played in the 1950s and 1960s, and coached rugby league in the 1960s and 1970s. He played club level rugby union (RU) for Newbridge RFC, as a hooker, and representative rugby league (RL) for Great Britain winning the 1960 Rugby League World Cup, and Wales, and at club level for Hull F.C. winning the 1960 Lance Todd Trophy as a hooker. He remained at Hull F.C. for his entire playing career, ultimately becoming an inductee in the club's Hall of Fame, he also set the record for most test matches played for Great Britain of any hooker, and coached at club level for York.

== Background ==
Harris was born in Crumlin, in Monmouthshire, and he died aged 79 in York, North Yorkshire, England.

== Playing career ==
In 1949 four players left the Newbridge club to play professional rugby league football in the 1949–50 Northern Rugby Football League season: Harris and Bill Hopkins to Hull F.C., Granville James to Hunslet and Glyn Meredith to Wakefield Trinity. He went on to gain selection to play international matches for Wales as well. Harris was selected to play for Great Britain in the inaugural Rugby League World Cup, the 1954 tournament.

Harris played hooker in Hull F.C.'s 13–30 defeat by Wigan in the 1959 Challenge Cup Final during the 1958–59 season at Wembley Stadium, London on Saturday 9 May 1959, in front of a crowd of 79,811, and played hooker, and was man of the match winning the Lance Todd Trophy in the 5–38 defeat by Wakefield Trinity in the 1959–60 Challenge Cup Final during the 1959–60 season at Wembley Stadium, London on Saturday 14 May 1960, in front of a crowd of 79,773.

During the 1959–60 season the Australian national team toured Europe, and Harris was selected play for Great Britain against them. Harris played hooker in Hull F.C.'s 14–15 defeat by Featherstone Rovers in the 1959 Yorkshire Cup Final at Headingley, Leeds on Saturday 31 October 1959, in front of a crowd of 23,983. Later Harris played for Great Britain in the 1960 World Cup.

Harris played over 400 games for Hull F.C. in the position of hooker, up to his retirement in 1962, when he became a coach of York.

== Coaching career ==
Harris coached the York club for 11 years, and was also a director of York Rugby League Football Club from 1966 until 1987.
