= Colin Hutton =

English rugby footballer and coach

Personal information
- Born: 1 May 1926 Prescot district, England
- Died: 3 February 2017 (aged 90)

Playing information
- Position: Fullback, Centre
Club
| Years | Team | Pld | T | G | FG | P |
|---|---|---|---|---|---|---|
| 1945–51 | Widnes | 131 | 16 | 167 |
| 1951–57 | Hull FC | 262 |
| | Total | 393 | 16 | 167 | 0 | 0 |
Representative
| Years | Team | Pld | T | G | FG | P |
| 1948–50 | Lancashire | 2 | 0 | 3 | 0 | 6 |

Coaching information
Club
| Years | Team | Gms | W | D | L | W% |
| 1957–70 | Hull Kingston Rovers |
Representative
| Years | Team | Gms | W | D | L | W% |
| 1962–68 | Great Britain | 22 | 5 | 8 | 9 | 23 |

Colin Hutton (1 May 1926 – 3 February 2017) was an English rugby union, and professional rugby league footballer who played in the 1940s and 1950s, and coached rugby league in the 1950s, 1960s and 1970s. He played at club level for Widnes and Hull FC, as a fullback or centre, and coached at representative level for Great Britain, and at club level for Hull Kingston Rovers, he was the Rugby Football League President for 1992–1993, and was the President of Hull Kingston Rovers up to his death.

== Background ==
Colin Hutton was born in Prescot, Lancashire, England, and he died aged 90 in Kingston upon Hull, East Riding of Yorkshire, England.

== Playing career ==
=== Widnes ===
Hutton joined Widnes in 1945 and remained with the club until 1951, during this period he made 131 appearances scoring 16 tries and kicking 167 goals.

During the period 1947–1949 Hutton was missing from the club due to National Service. Hutton was a Lance corporal in the Royal Engineers, and served near the Suez Canal at RAF Fayid, near Ismaïlia, Egypt from 1947 until 1949, during which time he played at representative level for the army in Egypt at rugby union as the British armed forces did not at this time support rugby league as an organised sport.

In his first season with the Widnes Hutton played at centre and kicked two conversions in a 7–3 victory over Wigan in the 1945 Lancashire Cup Final at Wilderspool Stadium, Warrington on Saturday 27 October 1945.

On his return from National Service Hutton resumed his playing career and played in the 1950 Challenge Cup Final at Wembley Stadium in Widnes' 0–19 defeat by Warrington.

=== Hull F.C. ===
In 1951 Hutton moved to Hull F.C. where he played for a further six years before retiring from his playing career in 1957. He made over 250 appearances for the club including scoring the winning penalty kick in Hull FC's 10–9 victory over Halifax in the Rugby Football League Championship Final during the 1955–56 season at Maine Road, Manchester on Saturday 12 May 1956.

== Coaching career ==
=== Hull Kingston Rovers ===
After retiring from playing, Hutton crossed Hull to become coach at rivals Hull Kingston Rovers, a position he held until May 1970 by which time he had coached Rovers in 534 matches. Included in this total were victory over Huddersfield in the Eastern Division Championship Final at Headingley during the 1961–62 season; two winning finals of the Yorkshire Cup, the first a 25–12 victory over Featherstone Rovers in the 1966, and the following year an 8–7 victory over Hull F.C. in the 1967 competition, one Yorkshire Cup Final defeat, 2–12 to Hunslet in the 1962 Yorkshire Cup, and a Challenge Cup Final defeat in the 1964 Challenge Cup losing 5–13 to Widnes at Wembley.

=== Great Britain ===
Along with Bill Fallowfield, Hutton was the Great Britain coach for the victorious 1962 Ashes series where Britain beat Australia 2–1 in the three match series and the 1968 Rugby League World Cup where Great Britain finished third, losing two of their three matches.

== Later life and death ==
After coaching Hull Kingston Rovers, Hutton served in various roles for the club eventually becoming chairman and, from 1997 until his death, President of the club. Away from Hull Kingston Rovers he was a member of the sports governing body, the Rugby Football League Council, and was a life vice-president of the Rugby Football League having also being chairman.

Hutton was recognised by the City of Hull by being made a Freedom of the City in 2013 and by Hull Kingston Rovers who renamed the north stand at their Craven Park ground after him in the same year.

Hutton holds a unique record as being the only person to attend Challenge Cup finals at Wembley as player, coach, club director, club chairman, club president and chairman of the governing body.

Hutton died on 3 February 2017, aged 90, two days before the start of the 2017 Championship season.
