= Arthur Daniels (rugby league) =

GB & Wales international rugby league footballer

Personal information
- Full name: Arthur Harper Daniels
- Born: 12 September 1922 Pontyberem, Carmarthenshire, Wales
- Died: 4 October 2001 (aged 79) Swansea, Glamorgan, Wales

Playing information
- Height: 5 ft 11 in (1.80 m)
- Weight: 15 st 6 lb (98 kg)
- Position: Wing
Club
Years	Team	Pld	T	G	FG	P
1945–57	Halifax	377	215	3	0	651
1957–59	Bradford Northern	61	35	0	0	105
	Total	438	250	3	0	756
Representative
Years	Team	Pld	T	G	FG	P
1949-53	Wales	13	9	0	0	27
1952-55	Great Britain	3	1	0	0	3

Arthur Harper Daniels (12 September 1922 – 4 October 2001) was a Welsh rugby league footballer.

Arthur Daniels was born in Pontyberem, Carmarthenshire, Wales. In 1945, he was one of three Welshmen, all from the Llanelli area, who had trials with the Halifax rugby league club. A wing, he made a relatively slow start to his rugby league career, which was interrupted with a period in the armed forces. Following a big improvement in his form in 1948–49, he was by 1949 an important part of the Halifax side.

In 1950, he toured Australasia with the Great Britain squad, but injury forced him to return home early before the first test. He made 13 appearances for Wales, scoring nine tries.

He was Halifax captain for the 1952/53 season. However, injuries would curtail his season. A splintered ankle bone sustained in the Second Test playing for Great Britain against the touring Australians at Swinton kept him out of the third. A broken arm in a home match against Huddersfield on Christmas Day 1952 ended his season.

His domestic career also included two Challenge Cup Final appearances at Wembley. The first was in 1954 when Halifax drew with Warrington, the tie was settled in the famous Odsal replay where he had a try disallowed in a defeat for Halifax. His next Wembley appearance came in 1956 against St. Helens where once again, Halifax were the losing side.

== International honours ==
Daniels won 13 caps for Wales in 1949–1953 while at Halifax, and won 3 caps for Great Britain in 1952–1955 while at Halifax.

=== Challenge Cup Final appearances ===
Arthur Daniels played on the wing in Halifax's 4–8 defeat by Warrington in the 1954 Challenge Cup Final replay during the 1953–54 season at Odsal Stadium, Bradford on Wednesday 5 May 1954, in front of a record crowd of 102,575 or more.

== Career highlight ==
All footballers during their career have one match which stands out more prominently than others. When Daniels was asked if there was such a game, he chose the First Test of the 1952 series against Australia at Headingley, a game in which he scored his first try at test level, helping to secure a 19–6 victory.

== Bradford and retirement ==
The 1956–57 season was his last at Thrum Hall, after which he had a brief spell with Bradford Northern before his retirement.

After retiring, he lived for a time in the Halifax area where he was a publican. He moved to Pudsey and then Bramley, before moving back to Pontyberem. He later ran a newsagents in Swansea. He spent his later years in Neath.

== Honoured at Halifax ==
Arthur Daniels is a Halifax Hall of Fame inductee.
