= 1957–58 Northern Rugby Football League season =

1957–58 Rugby Football League season
- League: Northern Rugby Football League
- Champions: Hull
- League Leaders: Oldham
- Top point-scorer(s): Bernard Ganley 453
- Top try-scorer(s): Mick Sullivan 50

The 1957–58 Northern Rugby Football League season was the 63rd season of rugby league football.

== Season summary ==
Hull F.C. won their fifth Championship when they beat Workington Town 20–3 in the play-off final. Oldham had finished the regular season as the league leaders.

The Challenge Cup winners were Wigan who beat Workington Town 13–9 in the final.

Oldham won the Lancashire League, and Halifax won the Yorkshire League. Oldham beat Wigan 13–8 to win the Lancashire County Cup, and Huddersfield beat York 15–8 to win the Yorkshire County Cup.

== Championship ==
	Team	Pld	W	D	L	Pts
1	Oldham	38	33	1	4	67
2	St. Helens	38	32	0	6	64
3	Workington Town	38	28	2	8	58
4	Hull	38	27	2	9	56
5	Wigan	38	27	0	11	54
6	Halifax	38	25	2	11	52
7	Leigh	38	24	0	14	48
8	Featherstone Rovers	38	23	1	14	47
9	Wakefield Trinity	38	22	2	14	46
10	Widnes	38	23	0	15	46
11	Hunslet	38	22	1	15	45
12	York	38	19	4	15	42
13	Warrington	38	19	1	18	39
14	Leeds	38	18	1	19	37
15	Salford	38	18	1	19	37
16	Hull Kingston Rovers	38	17	2	19	36
17	Whitehaven	38	17	1	20	35
18	Huddersfield	38	17	1	20	35
19	Rochdale Hornets	38	17	1	20	35
20	Bradford Northern	38	16	2	20	34
21	Barrow	38	16	2	20	34
22	Keighley	38	15	2	21	32
23	Bramley	38	14	2	22	30
24	Swinton	38	13	3	22	29
25	Blackpool Borough	38	12	0	26	24
26	Batley	38	10	0	28	20
27	Liverpool City	38	9	1	28	19
28	Dewsbury	38	6	4	28	16
29	Castleford	38	7	1	30	15
30	Doncaster	38	4	0	34	8

Play-offs

=== Play-offs ===
Semi-finals
1	Oldham	8
4	Hull	20
2	Workington Town	14
3	St. Helens	13

Championship final
Hull	20
Workington Town	3

==== Final ====
17 May 1958

Hull	20 – 3	Workington Town
Tries: Cooper, Finn, Scott, Whiteley; Goals: Bateson (4)		Tries: Southward

Odsal Stadium, Bradford
Attendance: 57,699
Referee: R. Gelder (Wakefield)

Hull	Number	Workington Town
	Teams	
Peter Bateson	1	John McAvoy
Ivor Watts	2	Ike Southward
Brian Cooper	3	John O'Neil
Brian Saville	4	Danny Leatherbarrow
Geoff Dannatt	5	K. Faulder
Frank Broadhurst	6	Harry Archer
Tommy Finn	7	Sol Roper
Mick Scott	8	Norman Herbert
Alan Holdstock	9	Bert Eden
Brian Hambling	10	Tommy Stamper
Cyril Sykes	11	Brian Edgar
Peter Whiteley	12	Cec Thompson
Johnny Whiteley	13	Benny Eve
Roy Francis	Coach	Jim Brough

== Challenge Cup ==
Wigan reached the final by beating Whitehaven 39–10 at home in the first round; Wakefield Trinity 11–5 away in the second round; Oldham 8–0 away in the quarter -finals and Rochdale Hornets 5–3 in the semi-final played at Station Road, Swinton. Captained by Eric Ashton, Wigan then beat Workington Town 13–9 in the Challenge Cup Final played at Wembley Stadium before a crowd of 66,109, with tries from Barton, McTigue and Sullivan and two goals from Cunliffe.

This was Wigan’s fifth Cup Final win in nine Final appearances. To date, this was Workington Town's last appearance in the Challenge Cup Final. Rees Thomas, Wigan's scrum half back won the Lance Todd Trophy for his man-of-the-match performance.

== Sources ==
- 1957-58 Rugby Football League season at Wigan.rlfans.com
- The Challenge Cup at The Rugby Football League website
