= Harry Markham =

England international rugby league footballer

Personal information
- Full name: Harry Markham
- Born: c. 1927
- Died: 4 June 1988 (aged 61)

Playing information
- Position: Second-row
Club
| Years | Team | Pld | T | G | FG | P |
|---|---|---|---|---|---|---|
| 1951–57 | Hull FC | 182 | 39 | 0 | 0 | 117 |
Representative
| Years | Team | Pld | T | G | FG | P |
| 1953 | England | 1 | 0 | 0 | 0 | 0 |

Harry Markham was an English former professional rugby league footballer who played in the 1950s. He played at representative level for England, and at club level for Hull FC, as a second-row.

== International honours ==
Harry Markham won a cap for England while at Hull in 1953 against France.
