= Roy Francis (rugby) =

Welsh rugby league coach (1919–1989)

Personal information
- Full name: Roy Francis
- Born: 20 January 1919 Brynmawr, Wales
- Died: 1 April 1989 (aged 70) Leeds, England

Playing information
- Position: Wing
Club
Years	Team	Pld	T	G	FG	P
1937–39	Wigan	12	9	0	0	27
1939–48	Barrow	113	72	2	0	220
1941–44	→Dewsbury (guest)	57	57	1	0	173
1942	→Batley (guest)	1	1	0	0	3
1948–49	Warrington	37	27	0	0	81
1949–55	Hull FC	127	60	0	0	180
	Total	347	226	3	0	684
Representative
Years	Team	Pld	T	G	FG	P
1946–48	Wales	5	1	0	0	3
1947	Great Britain	1	2	0	0	6
1942	Northern Command XIII	2	1	0	0	3
1942	Lancashire	1	0	0	0	0

Coaching information
Club
Years	Team	Gms	W	D	L	W%
1955–63	Hull FC
1963–68	Leeds	219	139	4	76	63
1968–70	North Sydney	44	17	2	25	39
1970–73	Hull FC
1974–75	Leeds	44	29	1	14	66
1975–77	Bradford Northern	61	29	3	29	48
	Total	368	214	10	144	58

Roy Francis (20 January 1919 – 1 April 1989) was a Welsh rugby league footballer and coach of the mid 20th century. He was the first Black British professional coach in any sport. Francis, who earlier played rugby union in Wales, was also a highly accomplished player, scoring 229 tries in his 356 career rugby league games, chiefly as a wing. A Great Britain and Wales national representative three-quarter back, he played for English clubs Wigan, Barrow, Dewsbury (World War II guest), Warrington and Hull F.C. Francis then became a head-coach with Hull FC. Renowned for his innovative coaching methods, he was regarded as a visionary, leading Hull FC to title success before going on to win the Challenge Cup with Leeds. He then broke further ground by moving on to coach in Australia with the North Sydney Bears before another brief stint at Leeds, and then Bradford Northern.

== Playing career ==
Francis came from Brynmawr, Wales. He played rugby union for Brynmawr RFC before joining English rugby league club Wigan as a seventeen-year-old on 14 November 1936. He made his début for Wigan on Friday 26 March 1937. He transferred from Wigan to Barrow in January 1939 but then served in the Army during the Second World War. He played rugby union in the Army and also made guest appearances for Dewsbury. Francis became a Sergeant in the British Army during World War II. He played as a centre for Northern Command XIII against a Rugby League XIII at Thrum Hall, Halifax on Saturday 21 March 1942. Francis played as a centre in Dewsbury's 14–25 aggregate defeat by Wigan in the Championship Final during the 1943–44 season; the 9–13 first-leg defeat at Central Park, Wigan on Saturday 13 May 1944, and scored a try in the 5–12 second-leg defeat at Crown Flatt, Dewsbury on Saturday 20 May 1944.

Returning to Barrow after the war, Francis represented Great Britain but was controversially overlooked for one Ashes tour to Australia for political reasons, the organisers fearing the ructions that could be caused by travelling to a country with an infamous bar on non-white people. He joined Warrington for £800 in July 1948. Roy Francis played in Warrington's 13–12 defeat by Huddersfield the Championship Final during the 1948–49 season at Maine Road, Manchester on Saturday 14 May 1949.

He transferred from Barrow to Hull FC during November 1949 for a fee of £1,250. Francis played his last game on Boxing Day 1955 before switching to coaching, a field in which he was to make an even greater impact.

== Coaching career ==
Francis' man-management, coaching methods and use of psychological techniques were considered years ahead of their time. He was the first coach to embrace players' families and offer them transport to games.

Roy Francis was the coach in Hull FC's 13–30 defeat by Wigan in the 1959 Challenge Cup Final during the 1958–59 season at Wembley Stadium, London on Saturday 9 May 1959, in front of a crowd of 79,811, and was the coach in the 5–38 defeat by Wakefield Trinity in the 1960 Challenge Cup Final during the 1959–60 season at Wembley Stadium, London on Saturday 14 May 1960, in front of a crowd of 79,773.

Francis left Hull FC for Leeds in 1963 and oversaw their victory in the 1968 Challenge Cup 'Watersplash' Final during the 1967–68 season at Wembley.

Francis moved to Sydney to coach the North Sydney Bears for the 1969 NSWRFL season and stayed until 1970.

From 1971 to 1973 Francis was Hull FC's team manager. He won a Premiership title back at Leeds during the 1974–75 season, and then coached Bradford Northern from 1975.

He died in April 1989, aged 70.

== Honours ==
Francis served as a Sergeant in the British Army during World War II.

=== As a player ===
- Championship Final runner-up: 1944

=== As a coach ===
- Championship Winners: 1956, 1958, 1974
- Challenge Cup: 1968

== Statue ==
In recognition of the success of Roy Francis as a coach and player a statue was unveiled to him in Brynmawr, Blaenau Gwent in October 2023.
