= Lance Todd Trophy =

Trophy in rugby league during Challenge Cup

- Awarded for: Challenge Cup; Final man of the match
- Country: United Kingdom
- Presented by: Reds Devils Association

History
- First award: 1945–46
- Most recent: Jack Farrimond

The Lance Todd Trophy is a trophy in rugby league, awarded to man of the match in the annual Challenge Cup Final.

Introduced in 1945–46, the trophy was named in memory of Lance Todd, the New Zealand-born player and administrator, who was killed in a road accident during the Second World War. After Todd's death a fund, the Lance Todd memorial Trophy Fund, was established by Australian journalist and rugby league official Harry Sunderland. The trophy's winner is selected by the members of the Rugby League Writers' Association present at the game. Until 1957 there was no permanent trophy, instead the winner was given a cash prize with which to buy themselves a memento. In 1956 the Red Devils Association, the official body representing ex-Salford players, decided to pay for a permanent trophy to be awarded to the winner and the first recipient of the new trophy was Jeff Stevenson in 1957. The trophy is presented at a celebratory dinner at the Salford Community Stadium, home of the Salford Red Devils. As of 2026, no Salford player has won this award.

The first winner of the trophy was Wakefield Trinity Centre, Billy Stott in 1945–46. St. Helens' Sean Long made history in 2006 becoming the first player to win the Lance Todd Trophy three times, having won in 2001 and 2004. Long's record was equalled by Warrington's Marc Sneyd in 2025, having previously won the trophy with Hull F.C. in 2016 and 2017. Four players have won the trophy twice: Warrington's Gerry Helme in 1949–50 and 1953–54; Wigan's Andy Gregory in 1987–88 and 1989–90; and Martin Offiah in 1991–92 and 1993–94; St. Helens' Paul Wellens in 2007 (jointly) and 2008. Sneyd and Wellens are the only players to win the award in consecutive finals.

Halifax's former Australian international fullback Graham Eadie and Wigan's 1984-85 Australian import stand-off Brett Kenny are the only players to win both the Lance Todd Trophy and the Clive Churchill Medal as the player of the match in the Sydney Premiership Grand Final. Eadie won the Lance Todd in 1986–87 and was (retrospectively) twice awarded the Churchill after Manly-Warringah's premiership wins in 1976 and 1978 while 1984–85 trophy winner Kenny was retrospectively awarded the Churchill for Parramatta's Grand Final wins in 1982 and 1983.

The first player to win the trophy on the losing side was Frank Whitcombe of Bradford Northern in the 1947–48 final against Wigan; he was also the first forward to win the award. Robbie Paul, Gary Connolly, Kevin Sinfield, Niall Evalds, Chris McQueen and Marc Sneyd have all won the award since 1996, despite each of them finishing on the losing side.

The youngest player to win the trophy was Huddersfield's Peter Ramsden who won it on his 19th birthday in 1952–53.

The trophy has been shared on two occasions, first in 1964–65 by Ray Ashby (Wigan) and Brian Gabbitas (Hunslet), and most recently in 2007 by St Helens duo Paul Wellens and Leon Pryce.

== Winners ==
Season	Recipient	Team	Position
1945–46	Billy Stott	Wakefield Trinity	Centre
1946–47	Willie Davies	Bradford Northern	Stand-off
1947–48	Frank Whitcombe †	Bradford Northern	Prop
1948–49	Ernest Ward	Bradford Northern	Centre
1949–50	Gerry Helme	Warrington Wolves	Scrum-half
1950–51	Cec Mountford	Wigan Warriors	Stand-off
1951–52	Billy Ivison	Workington Town	Loose forward
1952–53	Peter Ramsden	Huddersfield Giants	Stand-off
1953–54	Gerry Helme	Warrington Wolves	Scrum-half
1954–55	Jack Grundy	Barrow Raiders	Second-row
1955–56	Alan Prescott	St Helens	Prop
1956–57	Jeff Stevenson	Leeds Rhinos	Scrum-half
1957–58	Rees Thomas	Wigan Warriors	Scrum-half
1958–59	Brian McTigue	Wigan Warriors	Second-row
1959–60	Tommy Harris †	Hull F.C.	Hooker
1960–61	Dick Huddart	St Helens	Second-row
1961–62	Neil Fox	Wakefield Trinity	Centre
1962–63	Harold Poynton	Wakefield Trinity	Stand-off
1963–64	Frank Collier	Widnes Vikings	Prop
1964–65	Ray Ashby	Wigan Warriors	Fullback
1964–65	Brian Gabbitas †	Hunslet	Stand-off
1965–66	Len Killeen	St Helens	Wing
1966–67	Carl Dooler	Featherstone Rovers	Scrum-half
1967–68	Don Fox †	Wakefield Trinity	Prop
1968–69	Mal Reilly	Castleford Tigers	Loose forward
1969–70	Bill Kirkbride	Castleford Tigers	Second-row
1970–71	Alex Murphy	Leigh Centurions	Scrum-half
1971–72	Kel Coslett	St Helens	Loose forward
1972–73	Steve Nash	Featherstone Rovers	Scrum-half
1973–74	Derek Whitehead	Warrington Wolves	Fullback
1974–75	Ray Dutton	Widnes Vikings	Fullback
1975–76	Geoff Pimblett	St Helens	Fullback
1976–77	Steve Pitchford	Leeds Rhinos	Prop
1977–78	George Nicholls †	St Helens	Prop
1978–79	David Topliss †	Wakefield Trinity	Stand-off
1979–80	Brian Lockwood	Hull Kingston Rovers	Prop
1980–81	Mick Burke	Widnes Vikings	Fullback
1981–82	Eddie Cunningham †	Widnes Vikings	Centre
1982–83	David Hobbs	Featherstone Rovers	Second-row
1983–84	Joe Lydon	Widnes Vikings	Centre
1984–85	Brett Kenny	Wigan Warriors	Stand-off
1985–86	Bob Beardmore	Castleford Tigers	Scrum-half
1986–87	Graham Eadie	Halifax	Fullback
1987–88	Andy Gregory	Wigan Warriors	Scrum-half
1988–89	Ellery Hanley	Wigan Warriors	Loose forward
1989–90	Andy Gregory	Wigan Warriors	Fullback
1990–91	Denis Betts	Wigan Warriors	Second-row
1991–92	Martin Offiah	Wigan Warriors	Wing
1992–93	Dean Bell	Wigan Warriors	Loose forward
1993–94	Martin Offiah	Wigan Warriors	Wing
1994–95	Jason Robinson	Wigan Warriors	Wing
1996	Robbie Paul†	Bradford Bulls	Scrum-half
1997	Tommy Martyn	St Helens	Stand-off
1998	Mark Aston	Sheffield Eagles	Scrum-half
1999	Leroy Rivett	Leeds Rhinos	Wing
2000	Henry Paul	Bradford Bulls	Stand-off
2001	Sean Long	St Helens	Stand-off
2002	Kris Radlinski	Wigan Warriors	Fullback
2003	Gary Connolly †	Leeds Rhinos	Fullback
2004	Sean Long	St Helens	Stand-off
2005	Kevin Sinfield †	Leeds Rhinos	Loose forward
2006	Sean Long	St Helens	Scrum-half
2007	Paul Wellens	St Helens	Fullback
2007	Leon Pryce	St Helens	Stand-off
2008	Paul Wellens	St Helens	Fullback
2009	Michael Monaghan	Warrington Wolves	Hooker
2010	Lee Briers	Warrington Wolves	Stand-off
2011	Jeff Lima	Wigan Warriors	Prop
2012	Brett Hodgson	Warrington Wolves	Fullback
2013	Matty Smith	Wigan Warriors	Scrum-half
2014	Ryan Hall	Leeds Rhinos	Wing
2015	Tom Briscoe	Leeds Rhinos	Wing
2016	Marc Sneyd	Hull F.C.	Scrum-half
2017	Marc Sneyd	Hull F.C.	Scrum-half
2018	Tony Gigot	Catalans Dragons	Fullback
2019	Daryl Clark	Warrington Wolves	Hooker
2020	Richie Myler	Leeds Rhinos	Fullback
2021	Niall Evalds †	Castleford Tigers	Fullback
2022	Chris McQueen †	Huddersfield Giants	Second-row
2023	Lachlan Lam	Leigh Leopards	Scrum-half
2024	Bevan French	Wigan Warriors	Stand-off
2025	Marc Sneyd †	Warrington Wolves	Scrum-half
2026	Jack Farrimond	Wigan Warriors	Stand-off

† = Won Lance Todd Trophy whilst on losing team

=== Awards by club ===
Club	Number of winners
Barrow Raiders	1
Bradford Bulls	4
Castleford Tigers	4
Catalans Dragons	2 (Note: includes joint award in 2007)
Featherstone Rovers	3
Halifax	1
Hunslet	1 (Note: includes joint award in 1965)
Hull F.C.	3
Hull Kingston Rovers	1
Huddersfield Giants	4
Leeds Rhinos	8
Leigh Leopards	2
Sheffield Eagles	1
St Helens	12
Wakefield Trinity	4
Warrington Wolves	8
Widnes Vikings	5
Wigan Warriors	19
Workington Town	1

=== Winners by playing position ===
Position	Number of winners
Centre	5
Fullback	15
Hooker	3
Loose forward	6
Prop	8
Scrum-half	17
Second-row	7
Stand-off	15
Wing	7

== See also ==
- Harry Sunderland Trophy
- Man of Steel Award
- Clive Churchill Medal
