= List of St Helens R.F.C. international players =

This is a list of St Helens R.F.C. rugby league footballers who earned selection for an international team while playing for St Helens.

== Players ==
=== A ===
Name	Country	Caps	From	To	Notes
Kyle Amor	Ireland	5	2011	2017	
Vinnie Anderson	New Zealand	6	2003	2006	
Chris Arkwright	England; Great Britain	1; 2	1984	1985	In 1984 against Wales (sub), and won caps for Great Britain while at St. Helens in 1985 New Zealand (sub) (2 matches)
Jack Arkwright	England; Great Britain	5; 6	1933; 1936	1938; 1937	While at St. Helens in 1933 against Other Nationalities, while at Warrington 1936 France, Wales, in 1937 against France, in 1938 against France, and won caps for Great Britain while at Warrington in 1936 Australia (2 matches), New Zealand, in 1937 Australia (3 matches)
Danny Arnold	Scotland	9	1998	2003	
Len Aston	England; Great Britain	3; 3	1947; 1947	1948; 1947	Won caps for England while at St. Helens in 1947 against Wales, France, in 1948 against France, and won caps for Great Britain while at St. Helens in 1947 New Zealand (3 matches)
Paul Atcheson	Wales; Great Britain	17; 3	1995; 1997	2003; 1997	Won caps for Wales while at Wigan in 1995 against England, and France, in the 1995 Rugby League World Cup against Western Samoa, while at Oldham in 1996 against France, and England, while at St. Helens in 1998 against England, while at Widnes in 2000 against South Africa, in the 2000 Rugby League World Cup against Cook Islands, Lebanon, New Zealand, Papua New Guinea, and Australia, in 2001 against England, in 2002 against New Zealand, and in 2003 against Russia, and Australia, and won caps for Great Britain while at St. Helens in 1997 against Australia (SL) (3 matches)

=== B ===
Name	Country	Caps	From	To	Notes
Thomas "Tom" Barton	England	1	1906	1906	Won a cap in 1906 v Other Nationalities
Steve Bayliss	Wales	1	1981	1981	
Mike Bennett	England	1	2005	2005	v France (sub)
James Bentley	Ireland	3	2018	Present	
Billy Benyon	England; Great Britain	2; 6	1968; 1971	1970; 1972	Won caps for England while at St. Helens in 1968 against Wales, in 1970 against Wales, and won caps for Great Britain while at St. Helens in 1971 against France (2 matches), New Zealand, New Zealand (sub), in 1972 against France (2 matches)
Tommy Bishop	Great Britain	15	1966	1969	While at St. Helens in 1966 v Australia (3 matches), and New Zealand (2 matches), in 1967 Australia (3 matches), in 1968 v France (2 matches), in the 1968 Rugby League World Cup v Australia, France, and New Zealand, in 1968 v France, and in 1969 v France
Billy Blan	England; Great Britain	3; 3	1951; 1951	1952; 1951	
Mark Bournville	New Zealand; France	1 ?	1985; 1993	1985; 1994	
Frank Bowen	Great Britain	3	1928	1928	
Andy Bracek	Wales	?	2008	?	
Tommy Bradshaw	England; Great Britain	14; 5	1944; 1947	1951; 1950	WW2 guest from Wigan RLFC
Lee Briers	Wales; Great Britain	23; 1	1998; 2001	2011; 2001	
Brian Briggs	England; Great Britain	1; 1	1956; 1954	1956; 1954	
Darren Britt	Australia	9	1998	2000	
Stan Brogden	England; Great Britain	15; 16	1929; 1929	1943; 1937	
Dean Busby	England; Wales	1; 6	1992; 1998	1992; 2001	

=== C ===
Name	Country	Caps	From	To	Notes
Ray Cale	Wales	4	1951	1951	
Frank Carlton	England; Great Britain	1; 2	1956; 1958	1956; 1962	Won caps for England while at St. Helens in 1956 against France, and won caps for Great Britain while at St. Helens in 1958 New Zealand, in 1962 New Zealand
Sean Casey	Ireland	1	1995	1995	
Jason Cayless	New Zealand	10	2002	2006	
Dave Chisnall	England; Great Britain	4; 2	1975; 1970	1975; 1970	
Eric Chisnall	England; Great Britain	5; 2	1975; 1974	1975; 1974	Won caps for England while at St. Helens in 1975 v France, Wales, New Zealand, Australia (sub), Papua New Guinea won caps for Great Britain while at St. Helens in 1974 Australia (2 matches), New Zealand (2 matches)
Percy Coldrick	Wales; Great Britain	2; 3	1913; 1914	1914; 1914	
Ross Conlon	Australia	1	1984	1984	
Gary Connolly	England; Ireland; Great Britain	3; 1; 31	1992; 1998; 1991	1996; 1998; 2003	Won caps for England while at St. Helens in 1992 v Wales, while at Wigan in 1995 Australia, in 1996 v France, Wales, and won caps for Great Britain while at St. Helens in 1991 Papua New Guinea (sub), in 1992 v France (2 matches), Australia (sub) (2 matches), New Zealand (2 matches), Australia, in 1993 v France (2 matches), while at Wigan in 1993 New Zealand (3 matches), in 1994 v France, Australia (3 matches), in 1998 New Zealand (3 matches), in 1999 Australia, New Zealand, in 2001 v France, Australia (3 matches), in 2002 New Zealand (3 matches), while at Leeds in 2003 Australia (2 matches)
Leonard Constance	Wales	3	1948	1951	Won caps for Wales while at St. Helens, and Dewsbury 1948…1951
Shane Cooper	New Zealand	12	1985	1989	
Lachlan Coote	Scotland; Great Britain	3; 1	2016; 2019	Present; Present	
Kel Coslett	Wales	12	1963	1975	Won caps for Wales while at St. Helens 1963…1975 (9?)13-caps 1-try 7-goals 17-points (1975 Rugby League World Cup 6-caps, 1-try, 2-goals)
Neil Courtney	Great Britain	1	1982	1982	
Riki Cowan	New Zealand; Cook Islands	6 ?	1984; 1986	1985; 1986	
Eddie Cunningham	Wales; Great Britain	8; 1	1975; 1978	1978; 1978	Won caps for Wales while at St. Helens in the 1975 Rugby League World Cup against England, Australia, England, and Australia, in 1977 v England, in 1978 v France, England, and Australia, and won a cap for Great Britain while at St. Helens in 1978 v Australia (1975 Rugby League World Cup 4-caps)
Keiron Cunningham	Wales; Great Britain	13; 14	1995; 1996	2001; 2006	
Tommy Cunningham	Wales	2	1979	1979	
George Curran	England; Great Britain	12; 6	1946; 1946	1949; 1949	

=== D ===
Name	Country	Caps	From	To	Notes
Bob Dagnall	Great Britain	4	1961	1965	Won caps for Great Britain while at St. Helens in 1961 v New Zealand (2 matches), in 1964 v France, and in 1965 v France
Andy Dannatt	Great Britain	3	1985	1991	
Islwyn Davies	Wales	1	1935	1935	Won a cap and scored a goal for Wales while at St. Helens in the 11-24 defeat by England at Anfield, Liverpool on 10 Apr 1935
John Dickinson	England	1	1956	1956	Won a cap for England while at St. Helens in 1956 v France
Luke Douglas	Scotland	10	2013	2017	
Bernard Dwyer	Great Britain	1	1996	1996	

=== E ===
Name	Country	Caps	From	To	Notes
Kyle Eastmond	England	4	2009	2009	
David Eckersley	England; Great Britain	5; 4	1975; 1973	1978; 1974	Won caps for England while at St. Helens in 1975 v France (sub), Wales (sub), France (sub), while at Widnes in 1977 v Wales (sub), in 1978 v Wales (sub), and won caps for Great Britain while at St. Helens in 1973 Australia, Australia (sub), in 1974 Australia, Australia (sub)
Mark Elia	New Zealand; Western Samoa	47; 2	1985; 1992	1989; 1992	
Alf Ellaby	England; Great Britain	8; 13	1927; 1928	1935; 1933	Won caps for England while at St. Helens in 1927 v Wales, in 1928 v Wales (2 matches), in 1930 v Other Nationalities, in 1931 v Wales, in 1932 v Wales (2 matches), in 1934 v France, while at Wigan in 1935 v France, and won caps for Great Britain while at St. Helens in 1928 Australia (3 matches), and New Zealand (2 matches), in 1929 v Australia, 1930 v Australia, in 1932 Australia (3 matches), and New Zealand (2 matches), in 1933 Australia
Jacob Emmitt	Wales	6	2010	2016	Won caps for Wales while at St Helens in 2010 v France, Scotland and Ireland

=== F ===
Name	Country	Caps	From	To	Notes
Maurie Fa'asavalu	England; Great Britain	3; 2	2008; 2007	2009; 2007	Eligible for England after 4 years residency; formerly represented Samoa RU
Théo Fages	France	12	2013	Present	National captain
Les Fairclough	England; Great Britain	10; 6	1925; 1926	1931; 1930	Won caps for England while at St. Helens in 1925 v Wales (2 matches), in 1926 v Wales, and Other Nationalities, in 1927 v Wales, in 1928 v Wales (2 matches), in 1930 v Other Nationalities, in 1930 v Other Nationalities, in 1931 v Wales, and won caps for Great Britain while at St. Helens in 1926-27 v New Zealand, in 1928 v Australia (2 matches), and New Zealand (2 matches), and in 1929-30 v Australia
David Fairleigh	Australia	7	1994	1996	
John Fieldhouse	Great Britain	7	1985	1986	Won caps for Great Britain while at St. Helens in 1985 v New Zealand (3 matches), and while at Widnes in 1986 v France (2 matches), and Australia (2 matches)
Albert Fildes	England; Great Britain	2; 15	1927; 1926	1929; 1932	Won caps for England while at St Helens Recs in 1927 v Wales, in 1929 v Other Nationalities, and won caps for Great Britain while at St. Helens Recs in 1926-27 v New Zealand (2 matches), in 1928 v Australia (3 matches), and New Zealand (3 matches), in 1929-30 v Australia (3 matches), while at St. Helens in 1932 v Australia, and New Zealand (3 matches)
Tommy Flynn	Wales	1	1931	1931	
Matty Fozard	Wales	8	2014	2017	
Nick Fozzard	Great Britain	1	2005	2005	
Bill Francis	Wales; Great Britain	19; 4	1975; 1967	1980; 1977	Won caps for Wales while at Wigan in 1975 v France, England, in the 1975 Rugby League World Cup v France, England, Australia, New Zealand, England, Australia, New Zealand, and France, in 1977 v England, and France, while at St. Helens in 1978 v France, England, and Australia, in 1979 v France, and England, while at Oldham in 1980 v France, and England, and won caps for Great Britain while at Wigan in 1967 v Australia, and in the 1977 Rugby League World Cup v New Zealand, Australia (2 matches)
Ray French	Great Britain	4	1968	1968	
Alf Frodsham	England; Great Britain	2; 3	1927; 1928	1928; 1930	Won caps for England while at St. Helens in 1927 v Wales, in 1928 v Wales, and won caps for Great Britain while at St. Helens in 1928 v New Zealand (2 matches), and in 1929 v Australia

=== G ===
Name	Country	Caps	From	To	Notes
Ade Gardner	England; Great Britain	5; 5	2005; 2006	2008; 2007	Won caps for England while at St. Helens in 2005 v France, and won caps for Great Britain while at St. Helens in 2006 New Zealand, in 2007 v France, New Zealand (3 matches)
John Garvey	England	2	1933	1936	Won caps for England while at St. Helens in 1933 Other Nationalities, while at Broughton in 1936 v Wales
Scott Gibbs	Wales	2	1994	1995	
Matthew Gidley	Australia	17	1999	2004	
Lee Gilmour	Scotland; Great Britain	3; 15	2000; 1999	2000; 2006	
Martin Gleeson	England; Great Britain	6; 20	2008; 2002	2008; 2007	
Peter Glynn	England	2	1979	1979	Won caps for England while at St. Helens in 1979 v Wales, France
Peter Gorley	England; Great Britain	3; 3	1980; 1980	1981; 1981	Won caps for England while at St. Helens in 1980 v Wales, France (sub), in 1981 v Wales, and won caps for Great Britain while at St. Helens in 1980 New Zealand, in 1981 v France, France (sub)
Bobbie Goulding	England; Great Britain	5; 17	1995; 1990	1996; 1997	Won caps for England while at St. Helens in 1995 v Fiji, South Africa, Wales, Australia, in 1996 v Wales (sub), and won caps for Great Britain while at Wigan in 1990 Papua New Guinea (2 matches), New Zealand (3 matches), while at Leeds in 1992 v France, while at St. Helens in 1994 Australia, Australia (sub) (2 matches), in 1996 Papua New Guinea, Fiji, New Zealand (3 matches), in 1997, ASL (3 matches)
Regan Grace	Wales	6	2015	Present	
James Graham	England; Great Britain	44; 9	2008; 2006	2020; 2020	Both England & GB captain. England’s most capped player. Announced his international retirement in Sep 2020
Doug Greenall	England; Great Britain	6; 6	1951; 1951	1953; 1954	Won caps for England while at St. Helens in 1951 v France, in 1952 Other Nationalities, Wales, in 1953 v France (2 matches), Other Nationalities won caps for Great Britain while at St. Helens in 1951 New Zealand (3 matches), in 1952 Australia (2 matches), in 1954 New Zealand
Clive Griffiths	Wales	2	1980	1981	Later went on to coach Wales RL 1991-2000
Jonathan Griffiths	Wales; Great Britain	6; 1	1991; 1992	1994; 1992	Won caps for Wales while at St. Helens 1991…1994 6-caps 2-tries 1-drop-goal 9-points
Oswald Griffiths	Wales	4	1935	1936	
Paul Groves	Great Britain	1	1987	1987	v Papua New Guinea
Jack Grundy	Great Britain	12	1955	1957	Played in the 1957 Rugby League World Cup
Don Gullick	Wales	9	1950	1953	

=== H ===
Name	Country	Caps	From	To	Notes
Gareth Haggerty	Ireland	6	2006	2006	
Roy Haggerty	Great Britain	2	1987	1987	
Ben Halfpenny	England	1	1928	1928	v Wales
Trevor Hall	New Zealand	2	1928	1928	v England in Dunedin
Karle Hammond	Wales; Great Britain	3; 2	1998; 1996	1999; 1996	
Viv Harrison	Wales	3	1951	1951	
Joey Hayes	Great Britain	1	1996	1996	v Papua New Guinea
Mickey Higham	England; Great Britain	4; 4	2008; 2004	2009; 2005	
Brian Hogan	England	5	1975	1977	Played in 1975 Rugby League World Cup
Lance Hohaia	New Zealand	28	2002	2011	
Neil Holding	England; Great Britain	1; 4	1980; 1984	1980; 1984	
Sean Hoppe	New Zealand; Māori	35 ?	1992; 1990	2002; 2000	
Louis Houghton	England	2	1927	1931	
Dick Huddart	England; Great Britain	1; 16	1962; 1958	1962; 1963	Won caps for England while at St. Helens in 1962 v France, and won caps for Great Britain while at Whitehaven in 1958 Australia (2 matches), New Zealand (2 matches), while at St. Helens in 1959 v Australia, in 1961 New Zealand (3 matches), in 1962 v France (2 matches), Australia (3 matches), New Zealand (2 matches), in 1963 Australia
Eric Hughes	England; Great Britain	10; 8	1975; 1978	1979; 1982	
Alan Hunte	England; Great Britain	1; 15	1992; 1992	1992; 1997	Won caps for England while at St. Helens in 1992 v Wales, and won caps for Great Britain while at St. Helens in 1992 v France, Australia, in 1993 v France (2 matches), in 1994 Australia (3 matches), in 1996 Papua New Guinea, Fiji, New Zealand (3 matches), in 1997, ASL (3 matches)

=== I ===
Name	Country	Caps	From	To	Notes
Kevin Iro	New Zealand; Cook Islands	34; 3	1987; 2000	1998; 2006	

=== J ===
Name	Country	Caps	From	To	Notes
Mel James	Wales	11	1975	1981	Won caps for Wales while at St. Helens in the 1975 Rugby League World Cup v England, in 1978 v France, England, and Australia, in 1979 v France, and England, in 1980 v France, and England, in 1981 v France, and England (2 matches) (1975 Rugby League World Cup 1975 1-cap)
Pat Jarvis	Australia	1	1983	1983	
Emlyn Jenkins	Wales; England; Great Britain	4; 2; 9	1932; 1934; 1933	1936; 1934; 1937	
Albert Johnson	England; Great Britain	11; 6	1944; 1946	1947; 1947	
Berwyn Jones	Great Britain	3	1964	1966	
Josh Jones	Great Britain	3	2019	2019	
Les Jones	England; Great Britain	1; 1	1977; 1971	1977; 1971	
Robert Jones	Wales	3	1947	1949	Represented Wales XV (RU) while at Aberavon RFC in the 'Victory International' non-Test match(es) between December 1945 and April 1946, and won caps for Wales (RL) while at Swinton, and St. Helens 1947…1949
Stuart Jones	England	1	2004	2004	98-4 victory over Russia in 2004 where he scored a try
Tim Jonkers	Ireland	?	1999	2007	
Chris Joynt	England; Ireland; Great Britain	6; 4; 25	1992; 2000; 1993	1996; 2000; 2002	GB captain. Won caps for England while at St. Helens in 1992 v Wales (sub), in 1995 Australia (sub) (2 matches), South Africa, in 1996 v France, Wales, and won caps for Great Britain while at St. Helens in 1993 v France (sub), New Zealand (3 matches), in 1994 v Wales, Australia (3 matches), in 1996 Papua New Guinea, New Zealand (sub) (3 matches), in 1997, ASL (3 matches), in 1998 New Zealand (3 matches), in 1999 New Zealand, in 2001 v France, Australia (3 matches), in 2002 Australia (sub), New Zealand (sub)

=== K ===
Name	Country	Caps	From	To	Notes
Tony Karalius	Great Britain	5	1971	1972	Won caps for Great Britain while at St. Helens in 1971 New Zealand (3 matches), in 1972 v France, New Zealand (1972 Rugby League World Cup 1972 1-cap)
Vince Karalius	Great Britain	12	1958	1963	Won caps for Great Britain while at St. Helens (1960 Rugby League World Cup 1960 3-caps)
Arthur Kelly	New Zealand	3	1907	1908	Played in the first ever rugby league match v Wales
Ken Kelly	England; Great Britain	3; 4	1979; 1972	1981; 1982	Won caps for England while at Warrington in 1979 v Wales, in 1981 v France, Wales, and won caps for Great Britain while at St. Helens in 1972 v France (2 matches), while at Warrington in 1980 New Zealand, in 1982 Australia
Edward Kerwick	England	1	1949	1949	
Morgan Knowles	Wales	4	2015	2019	

=== L ===
Name	Country	Caps	From	To	Notes
Anthony Laffranchi	Australia; Italy	5; 3	2008; 2013	2009; 2013	
Doug Laughton	England; Great Britain	1; 15	1977; 1970	1977; 1979	
Joseph Lavery	New Zealand	1	1907	1908	
Barry Ledger	England; Great Britain	1; 2	1984; 1985	1984; 1986	Won caps for England while at St. Helens in 1984 v Wales (sub), and won caps for Great Britain while at St. Helens in 1985 v France, in 1986 Australia
Frank Lee	England	1	1906	1906	v Other Nationalities
Arthur Lemon	Wales	13	1929	1933	
George Lewis	Wales	3	1926	1928	
Graham Liptrot	England	2	1979	1979	
Steve Llewellyn	Wales	4	1948	1953	
Jonny Lomax	England; Great Britain	9; 4	2016; 2019	Present; Present	
Sean Long	England; Great Britain	6; 15	2000; 1997	2000; 2006	Won caps for England while at St. Helens in 2000 Australia, Russia (sub), Fiji, Ireland, New Zealand won caps for Great Britain while at St. Helens in 1997, ASL (sub), in 1998 New Zealand, in 1999 Australia (sub), New Zealand (sub), in 2003 Australia, Australia (sub), in 2004 Australia (3 matches), New Zealand, in 2006 New Zealand (3 matches), Australia
Paul Loughlin	Great Britain	15	1988	1992	
Jamie Lyon	Australia	8	2001	2010	

=== M ===
Name	Country	Caps	From	To	Notes
Tommy Makinson	England	4	2018	Present	v New Zealand got Player of Series and won Golden Boot for season 2019.
George Mann	Tonga; New Zealand	? 9	1986; 1989	1995; 1991	
John Mantle	Wales; Great Britain	8; 13	1975; 1966	1975; 1973	Won caps for Wales while at St. Helens 1968…1978 15(12?)-caps + 1-cap (sub) 1-try 3-points, and won caps for Great Britain while at St. Helens in 1966 v France (2 matches), and Australia (3 matches), in 1967 v Australia (2 matches), in 1969 v France, in 1971 v France (2 matches), and New Zealand (2 matches), and 1973 v Australia (1975 Rugby League World Cup 1975 8-caps, 1-try)
Willie Manu	Tonga	11	2000	2013	
Tommy Martyn	Ireland	3	1997	1998	
Mose Masoe	Samoa	7	2013	2014	
Keith Mason	Wales	2	2001	2002	
Sione Mata'utia	Australia; Samoa	3; 1	2014; 2017	2014; Present	Became youngest ever test player for Australia v England
Vila Matautia	Samoa; United States	2 ?	1995; 2000	1995; 2000	Played for the USA, trying to get them into the 2000 Rugby League World Cup through his grandmother who was born in Hawaii
Roy Mathias	Wales; Great Britain	20; 1	1975; 1979	1981; 1979	Won a cap for Wales (RU) while at Llanelli RFC in 1972 v France at Cardiff Arms Park on 4 April 1970, and won caps for Wales (RL) while at St. Helens in the 1975 Rugby League World Cup v France, England, Australia, New Zealand, Australia, New Zealand, France, and won a cap for Great Britain while at St. Helens in 1979 v Australia (1975 Rugby League World Cup 1975 7-caps)
Louie McCarthy-Scarsbrook	England; Ireland	2; 3	2008; 2017	2009; Present	
Dave McConnell	Scotland	8	2008	2008	2008 Rugby League World Cup
Stan McCormick	England; Great Britain	3; 3	1948; 1948	1948; 1949	
Jarrod McCracken	New Zealand	22	1991	1999	1995 Rugby League World Cup
Tommy McCue	England; Great Britain	11; 6	1935; 1936	1946; 1946	
Wayne McDonald	Scotland; United Arab Emirates	6; 2	1999; 2009	1999; 2009	
Shannon McDonnell	Ireland	6	2014	2017	2017 Rugby League World Cup
Hugh McDowell	England	1	1939	1939	v France
Len McIntyre	Great Britain	1	1963	1963	v New Zealand
Tom McKinney	Great Britain	16	1951	1957	
Jim Measures	Great Britain	2	1963	1963	
Francis Meli	Samoa; New Zealand	7; 14	2000; 2001	2010; 2004	
Mal Meninga	Australia	46	1982	1995	
Bill Mercer	England	1	1930	1930	v Other Nationalities
Peter Metcalfe	England	1	1953	1953	v France
Scott Moore	England	2	2009	2009	
Chris Morley	Wales	13	1996	2006	
Glyn Moses	Wales; Great Britain	2; 9	1953; 1955	1953; 1955	
Alex Murphy	England; Great Britain	2; 27	1969; 1958	1969; 1971	
Mick Murphy	Wales	5	1975	1979	
Frank Myler	England; Great Britain	1; 24	1962; 1960	1962; 1970	

=== N ===
Name	Country	Caps	From	To	Notes
Kevin Naiqama	Fiji	15	2009	Present	Captain
Jon Neill	Scotland	2	1997	1999	
Paul Newlove	England; Great Britain	7; 20	1992; 1989	2001; 1998	Won caps for England while at Featherstone Rovers in 1992 v Wales, while at Bradford Northern in 1995 v Wales, Australia (2 matches), Fiji, Wales, while at St. Helens in 1996 v France, and won caps for Great Britain while at Featherstone Rovers in 1989 New Zealand (sub), New Zealand (2 matches), in 1991 Papua New Guinea, in 1992 Papua New Guinea (sub), Australia (3 matches), New Zealand (sub), in 1993 v France, while at Bradford Northern New Zealand (3 matches), in 1994 v France, Australia, Australia (sub), while at St. Helens in 1997, ASL (3 matches), in 1998 New Zealand
George Nicholls	England; Great Britain	11; 29	1975; 1971	1978; 1979	Won caps for England while at St. Helens in 1975 v France, France, France, Wales, Wales (sub), New Zealand, Australia, in 1977 v France, in 1978 v France, Wales, and won caps for Great Britain while at Widnes in 1971 New Zealand, in 1972 v France (2 matches), Australia (2 matches), France, New Zealand, while at St. Helens in 1973 Australia (2 matches), in 1974 v France (2 matches), Australia (3 matches), New Zealand (3 matches), in 1977 v France, New Zealand, Australia, in 1978 Australia (3 matches), in 1979 Australia (3 matches), New Zealand (3 matches) (1972 Rugby League World Cup 1972 4-caps, 1-try)
Sonny Nickle	England; Great Britain	1; 6	1995; 1992	1995; 1995	
Derek Noonan	England	4	1975	1975	

=== O ===
Name	Country	Caps	From	To	Notes
Michael O'Connor	Australia	13	1979	1982	
Julian O’Neill	United States	3	1999	2000	
Roger Owen	Wales	2	1981	1981	
Stan Owen	Wales; Great Britain	2; 1	1955; 1958	1963; 1958	
George Owens	Wales	1	1923	1923	

=== P ===
Name	Country	Caps	From	To	Notes
Agnatius Paasi	Tonga	1	2014	Present	v PNG starting at second-row
George Parsons	Wales; Great Britain	13; 1	1948; 1952	1959; 1956	Represented Wales (RU) while at Llanelli RFC in the 'Victory International' non-Test match(es) between December 1945 and April 1946, won a cap for Wales (RU) while at Cardiff RFC in 1947 v England, won caps for Wales (RL) while at St. Helens, and also represented Great Britain (RL) while at St. Helens between 1952 and 1956 v France (1 non-Test match)
Joseph Paulo	Samoa; United States	11; 6	2007; 2011	2017; 2013	
Mark Percival	England	5	2016	Present	
Apollo Perelini	Western Samoa	2	1995	1995	
Josh Perry	Australia	4	2008	2010	
Dominique Peyroux	Cook Islands; Samoa	8; 3	2009; 2014	Present; 2015	
Geoff Pimblett	England	1	1978	1978	
Harry Pinner	England; Great Britain	3; 7	1980; 1980	1981; 1986	Won caps for England while at St. Helens in 1980 v Wales, France, in 1981 v France, and won caps for Great Britain while at St. Helens in 1980 New Zealand (sub), New Zealand, in 1985 New Zealand (3 matches), in 1986 v France, while at Widnes in 1986 Australia
Andy Platt	England; Great Britain	? 25	1995; 1985	1995; 1993	Won caps for England while at Widnes/Auckland in 1995 Australia (2 matches), South Africa, Wales, and won caps for Great Britain while at St. Helens in 1985 v France (sub), in 1986 v France (sub), Australia (sub), in 1988 v France (2 matches), Australia (2 matches), while at Wigan in 1989 New Zealand (3 matches), in 1990 v France, Australia (2 matches), in 1991 v France (2 matches), Papua New Guinea, in 1992 v France (sub), Papua New Guinea, Australia (3 matches), New Zealand (2 matches), Australia, in 1993 v France
Stanley Powell	Wales	2	1945	1947	Won caps for Wales (RL) while at St. Helens v England at Central Park, Wigan during March 1945, and while at Warrington in 1947
Alan Prescott	England; Great Britain	11; 28	1950; 1951	1956; 1958	Won caps for England while at St. Helens in 1950 v Wales, France, in 1951 v France, in 1952 Other Nationalities (2 matches), Wales, in 1953 v France (2 matches), Other Nationalities, in 1955 Other Nationalities, in 1956 v France, and won caps for Great Britain while at St. Helens in 1951 New Zealand (2 matches), in 1952 Australia (3 matches), in 1954 Australia (3 matches), New Zealand (3 matches), in 1955 New Zealand (3 matches), in 1956 v Australia (3 matches), in 1957 v France (5 matches), France, Australia, New Zealand, in 1958 v France, Australia (2 matches) (1957 Rugby League World Cup 1957 Captain 3-caps)
Steve Prescott	England; Ireland	2; 4	1996; 2000	1996; 2000	Won caps for England while at St. Helens in 1996 v France, Wales
Gareth Price	Wales	10	1999	2006	Won caps for Wales while at St. Helens, Leigh, Rochdale Hornets, and Celtic Crusaders 1999…present 2(9, 10?)-caps + 9-caps (sub) 1-try 4-points
Ray Price	Wales; Great Britain	6; 9	1948; 1954	1953; 1957	
Bob Prosser	Wales	4	1968	1970	
Leon Pryce	England; Great Britain	7; 17	1999; 2001	2008; 2007	Won caps for England while at Bradford Bulls in 1999 v France, in 2000 Australia, Russia, in 2001 v Wales, and won caps for Great Britain while at Bradford Bulls in 2001 Australia (3 matches), in 2002 New Zealand (3 matches), in 2005 Australia (2 matches), New Zealand (2 matches), while at St. Helens in 2006 New Zealand (3 matches), Australia (2 matches), in 2007 New Zealand (2 matches) in 2008 Rugby League World Cup 2008 Australia, New Zealand (2 matches), Papua New Guinea
Tony Puletua	New Zealand; Samoa; Exiles	22; 9; 2	1998; 2008; 2011	2007; 2013; 2012	

=== R ===
Name	Country	Caps	From	To	Notes
Graham Rees	Wales	4	1968	1970	
Austin Rhodes	Great Britain	4	1957	1961	1957 Rugby League World Cup
Jason Roach	Scotland	8	1998	2004	
Robert Roberts	England	2	1939	1940	Both caps v Wales
Jimmy Robinson	England	1	1944	1944	v Wales
James Roby	England; Great Britain	31; 7	2008; 2006	Present; Present	
Frederick Roffey	Wales	2	1921	1926	
Tea Ropati	New Zealand; Western Samoa	9; 2	1986; 1994	1997; 1996	
Steve Rule	Wales	1	1981	1981	
Martin Ryan	England; Great Britain	12; 4	1943; 1947	1950; 1950	

=== S ===
Name	Country	Caps	From	To	Notes
Bill Sayer	Great Britain	7	1961	1963	
Paul Sculthorpe	England; Great Britain	4; 26	1996; 1996	1996; 2006	Won caps for England while at Warrington in 1996 v France, Wales, while at St. Helens in 2000 New Zealand, in 2001 v Wales, and won caps for Great Britain while at Warrington in 1996 Papua New Guinea (sub), Fiji, New Zealand (3 matches), in 1997, ASL (3 matches), while at St. Helens in 1998 v New Zealand (3 matches), in 1999 Australia (sub), in 2001 Australia (3 matches), in 2002 Australia, New Zealand (2 matches), in 2003 Australia (3 matches), in 2004 Australia (3 matches), New Zealand, in 2006 New Zealand
Chris Seldon	Wales	2	1980	1980	
Tommy Shannon	England	2	1938	1938	
Ernest Shaw	England	2	1921	1921	
Michael Shenton	England	10	2008	2014	
Nat Silcock	England; Great Britain	3; 3	1951; 1954	1953; 1954	
Chris Smith	Wales	5	1999	2002	
Darren Smith	Australia	12	1997	2003	
Matty Smith	England	4	2014	2015	
Sia Soliola	New Zealand; Samoa	12; 4	2006; 2013	2009; 2013	
Paul Southern	Ireland	8	1999	2004	
John Stephens	England	3	1969	1970	
Anthony Stewart	Ireland	9	2003	2007	
Jim Stott	England; Great Britain	3; 1	1943; 1947	1947; 1947	
Harry Street	England; Great Britain	6; 4	1950; 1950	1953; 1950	
Anthony Sullivan	Wales	?	1995	2000	2000 Rugby League World Cup
Mick Sullivan	England; Great Britain	3; 46	1955; 1954	1962; 1963	

=== T ===
Name	Country	Caps	From	To	Notes
Zeb Taia	New Zealand; Cook Islands	1; 4	2010; 2012	2010; 2013	
Willie Talau	New Zealand; Samoa	13; 3	1999; 2007	2006; 2008	
Lama Tasi	Samoa	1	2013	Present	
Kevin Taylor	England	1	1968	1968	
John Tembey	Great Britain	2	1963	1964	Won caps for Great Britain while at St. Helens in 1963 v Australia, and in 1964 v France
Abe Terry	Great Britain	11	1958	1962	Won caps for Great Britain while at St. Helens in 1958 v Australia (2 matches), in 1959 v France (2 matches), and Australia (3 matches), in 1960 v France, in 1961 v France (2 matches), and while at Leeds in 1962 v France
Luke Thompson	England; Great Britain	4; 3	2018; 2019	Present; Present	
Frank Tracey	England	2	1939	1940	Won caps for England while at St. Helens in 1939 v France, in 1940 v Wales
Hubert Turtill	New Zealand	6	1907	1908	

=== V ===
Name	Country	Caps	From	To	Notes
Paul Vautin	Australia	13	1982	1989	
Atelea Vea	Tonga	2	2009	2009	
Phil Veivers	Scotland	1	1997	1997	
Gray Viane	Samoa	3	2005	2006	
Don Vines	Wales; Great Britain	2; 3	1959; 1959	1963; 1959	

=== W ===
Name	Country	Caps	From	To	Notes
Archie Waddell	New Zealand	7	1919	1919	
Adam Walker	Scotland	10	2013	Present	
Anthony Walker	Wales	6	2013	2016	International début against the USA in a match that also saw him score his first international try
Alex Walmsley	England; Great Britain	5; 3	2017; 2019	Present; Present	Represented England in the 2017 Rugby League World Cup
John Walsh	England; Great Britain	4; 5	1975; 1972	1975; 1972	Won caps for England while at St. Helens in 1975 v France, Australia, New Zealand, Papua New Guinea, and won caps for Great Britain while at St. Helens in 1972 v France (sub), Australia (2 matches), France, New Zealand (1972 Rugby League World Cup 1972 4-caps)
Bobby Wanbon	Wales	8	1968	1975	He won caps for Wales (RL) while at Warrington in the 1975 Rugby League World Cup against England, Australia, and New Zealand
Kevin Ward	Great Britain	18	1984	1992	
Jack Waring	England	1	1940	1940	v Wales
John Warlow	Wales; Great Britain	3; 6	1968; 1964	1970; 1971	Won caps for Wales (RU) while at Llanelli RFC in 1962 Ireland won caps for Great Britain while at St. Helens in 1964 v France, in 1968 New Zealand, France, while at Widnes in 1971 v France (2 matches), New Zealand (1968 Rugby League World Cup 1968 2-caps)
Cliff Watson	England; Great Britain	3; 30	1969; 1963	1970; 1970	Won caps for England while at St. Helens, in 1969 v Wales (sub), France, in 1970 v Wales, and won caps for Great Britain while at St. Helens in 1963 Australia (2 matches), in 1966 v France (2 matches), Australia (3 matches), New Zealand (2 matches), in 1967 v France, Australia (3 matches), in 1968 v France (2 matches), Australia, France, New Zealand (sub), in 1969 v France, in 1970 Australia (3 matches), New Zealand (3 matches), Australia (2 matches), France, New Zealand, in 1971 v France (1968 Rugby League World Cup 3-caps, 1970 Rugby League World Cup 4-caps, 1-try)
Paul Wellens	England; Great Britain	11; 20	2000; 2001	2008; 2007	Won caps for England while at St. Helens in 2000 Australia (sub), Russia, Fiji, Ireland, New Zealand, in 2001 v Wales, and won caps for Great Britain while at St. Helens in 2001 v France, Australia (sub), Australia, in 2002 Australia, in 2004 Australia (3 matches), New Zealand (2 matches), in 2005 New Zealand (2 matches), Australia, in 2006 New Zealand (3 matches), Australia (2 matches), in 2007 New Zealand (3 matches)
Dave Whittle	Wales	?	?	?	2000 Rugby League World Cup
Jon Wilkin	England; Great Britain	10; 6	2004; 2006	2011; 2007	Won caps for England while at St. Helens in 2004 v France, Ireland, in 2005 New Zealand won caps for Great Britain while at St. Helens in 2006 Australia (sub) (2 matches), New Zealand (sub), in 2007 v France, New Zealand, New Zealand (sub)
Frank Wilson	Wales	14	1968	1976	Won caps for Wales while at St. Helens in the 1975 Rugby League World Cup v France, England, Australia, England, Australia, New Zealand, and France (1975 Rugby League World Cup 7-caps, 1-try)
Tom Winnard	England	1	1937	1937	While at Bradford Northern in 1937 against France at Thrum Hall, Halifax
