= 1953–54 Lancashire Cup =

- Structure: Regional knockout championship
- Teams: 14
- Winners: St. Helens
- Runners-up: Wigan

The 1953–54 Lancashire Cup was the forty-first occasion on which the RFL Lancashire Cup competition was held.

St. Helens won the trophy by beating Wigan by the score of 16–8.

The match was played at Station Road, Pendlebury, (historically in the county of Lancashire). The attendance was 42,793 and receipts were £6,918.

The attendance was again a record, albeit only beating the previous record by about 250.

Sport in general was now at its height of popularity, brought about by the ending of the Second World War, the new peace, the new affluence and more free time. Rugby League was no exception and this particular attendance record would never be broken.

== Background ==
Overall, the number of teams entering that year's competition remained the same as last year's total of 14.

The same pre-war fixture format was retained. This season saw no bye but one "blank" or "dummy" fixture in the first round. There was also one bye but no "blank" fixture" in the second round.

As last season, all the first round matches of the competition will be played on the basis of two legged, home and away, ties – and the remainder of the rounds remaining on straight forward knock-out basis.

== Competition and results ==
=== Round 1 – first leg ===
Involved 7 matches (with no bye and one "blank" fixture) and 14 clubs

Game No	Fixture date	Home team	Score	Away team	Venue	agg	Att	Rec	Notes	Ref
1	Sat 05 Sep 1953	Barrow	14–13	St. Helens	Craven Park		11,921			
2	Sat 05 Sep 1953	Liverpool City	2–14	Swinton	Mill Yard, Knotty Ash					
3	Sat 05 Sep 1953	Rochdale Hornets	7–12	Workington Town	Athletic Grounds					
4	Sat 05 Sep 1953	Salford	12–7	Wigan	The Willows					
5	Sat 05 Sep 1953	Warrington	28–7	Belle Vue Rangers	Wilderspool					
6	Sat 05 Sep 1953	Whitehaven	13–12	Oldham	Recreation Ground					
7	Sat 05 Sep 1953	Widnes	9–14	Leigh	Naughton Park					
8		blank		blank						

=== Round 1 – second leg ===
Involved 7 matches (with no bye and one "blank" fixture) and 14 clubs. These are the reverse fixture from the first leg

Game No	Fixture date	Home team	Score	Away team	Venue	agg	Att	Rec	Notes	Ref
1	Wed 09 Sep 1953	St. Helens	21–17	Barrow	Knowsley Road	34–31	20,100			
2	Wed 09 Sep 1953	Swinton	20–4	Liverpool City	Station Road	34–6				
3	Wed 09 Sep 1953	Workington Town	10–5	Rochdale Hornets	Borough Park	22–12				
4	Mon 07 Sep 1953	Wigan	28–2	Salford	Central Park	35–14				
5	Tue 08 Sep 1953	Belle Vue Rangers	14–17	Warrington	Belle Vue Stadium	21–46				
6	Mon 07 Sep 1953	Oldham	45–6	Whitehaven	Watersheddings	57–19				
7	Wed 09 Sep 1953	Leigh	25–5	Widnes	Kirkhall Lane	39–14				
8		blank		blank						

=== Round 2 – quarterfinals ===
Involved 3 matches (with one bye) and 7 clubs

Game No	Fixture date	Home team	Score	Away team	Venue	agg	Att	Rec	Notes	Ref
1	Wed 23 Sep 1953	St. Helens	38–9	Swinton	Knowsley Road		19,000			
2	Wed 23 Sep 1953	Wigan	10–7	Workington Town	Central Park					
3	Thu 24 Sep 1953	Warrington	12–11	Oldham	Wilderspool					
4		Leigh		bye						

=== Round 3 – semifinals ===
Involved 2 matches and 4 clubs

Game No	Fixture date	Home team	Score	Away team	Venue	agg	Att	Rec	Notes	Ref
1	Mon 28 Sep 1953	Wigan	11–6	Leigh	Central Park					
2	Thu 01 Oct 1953	St. Helens	17–10	Warrington	Knowsley Road		23,184			

=== Final ===
Game No	Fixture date	Home team	Score	Away team	Venue	agg	Att	Rec	Notes	Ref
	Saturday 24 October 1953	St. Helens	16–8	Wigan	Station Road		42,793	£6,918	1 2	

==== Teams and scorers ====
St. Helens	No.	Wigan
	teams	
Glyn Moses	1	Jack Cunliffe
Steve Llewellyn	2	Brian Nordgren
Doug Greenall	3	Jack Broome
Don Gullick	4	Ernie Ashcroft
Stan McCormick	5	Ronnie Hurst
Peter Metcalfe	6	Jack Fleming
Jimmy Honey	7	Johnny Alty
Alan Prescott	8	Ken Gee
Reg Blakemore	9	Ronald Mather
George Parr	10	Nat Silcock, Jr.
George Parsons	11	Frank Collier
Bill Bretherton	12	Tommy Horrocks
Vince Karalius	13	Harry Street
16	score	8
4	HT	8
	Scorers	
	Tries	
Jimmy Honey (1)	T	Jack Fleming (1)
Glyn Moses (1)	T	Harry Street (1)
	Goals	
Peter Metcalfe (5)	G	Ken Gee (1)
Referee		M. Coates, Pudsey

Scoring – Try = three (3) points – Goal = two (2) points – Drop goal = two (2) points

=== The road to success ===
All the first round ties were played on a two leg (home and away) basis.
The first club named in each of the first round ties played the first leg at home.
The scores shown in the first round are the aggregate score over the two legs.

First round
Barrow	31
St. Helens	34
Liverpool City	6
Swinton	34
Warrington	46
Belle Vue Rangers	21
Whitehaven	19
Oldham	57
Salford	14
Wigan	35
Rochdale Hornets	12
Workington Town	22
Widnes	14
Leigh	39
blank
blank

Second round
St. Helens	38
Swinton	9
Warrington	12
Oldham	11
Wigan	10
Workington Town	7
Leigh
bye

Semifinals
St. Helens	17
Warrington	10
Wigan	11
Leigh	6

Final
St. Helens	16
Wigan	8

== Notes and comments ==
1 * The attendance of 42,793 was again a record, albeit only beating the previous record by about 250 This attendance record would never ever be equalled or beaten.
The receipts were also a new record, but this would only stand for 5 years.
2 * Station Road was the home ground of Swinton from 1929 to 1932 and at its peak was one of the finest rugby league grounds in the country and it boasted a capacity of 40,000. The actual record attendance was for the Challenge Cup semi-final on 7 April 1951 when 44,621 watched Wigan beat Warrington 3–2

== See also ==
- 1953–54 Northern Rugby Football League season
- Rugby league county cups
