= Leonard Constance =

Wales international rugby league footballer

Len Constance
Personal information
- Full name: Leonard Constance
- Born: 2 November 1922 Pontypool district, Wales
- Died: October 1990 (aged 67) Wales

Playing information
- Height: 5 ft 5 in (1.65 m)
- Weight: 10 st 2 lb (64 kg)

Rugby union
- Position: Fly-half
Club
Years	Team	Pld	T	G	FG	P
1944–47	Newport RFC	3	1
	Bristol
	Portsmouth
	Royal Navy
	Combined Services XV
	Total	3	1	0	0	0
Representative
Years	Team	Pld	T	G	FG	P
	Hampshire

Rugby league
- Position: Centre, Stand-off
Club
Years	Team	Pld	T	G	FG	P
1946–49	St. Helens	66	7	4	0	29
1949–51	Dewsbury
1951–52	Wigan	31	12	9	0	54
1952–52/53	Wakefield Trinity	12	1	0	0	3
	Total	109	20	13	0	86
Representative
Years	Team	Pld	T	G	FG	P
1948–51	Wales	3	0	0	0	0

Coaching information
Club
Years	Team	Gms	W	D	L	W%
1951	Dewsbury

Leonard "Len" Constance (2 November 1922 – October 1990) was a Welsh rugby union, and professional rugby league footballer who played in the 1940s and 1950s, and coached rugby league in the 1950s. He played representative level rugby union (RU) for Hampshire, and at club level for Newport RFC, Bristol, Portsmouth, Royal Navy and Combined Services, as a fly-half and representative level rugby league (RL) for Wales, and at club level for St. Helens, Dewsbury (captain), Wigan, and Wakefield Trinity, as a centre, or stand-off, and coached club level rugby league (RL) at Dewsbury.

== Background ==
Len Constance's birth was registered in Pontypool district, Wales, he was a Lieutenant in the Royal Naval Volunteer Reserve, and he died aged c. 67–68 in Wales.

== Playing career ==
=== International honours ===
Len Constance won 3 caps for Wales (RL) in 1948–1951 while at St. Helens, and Dewsbury.

=== County League appearances ===
Len Constance played in Wigan's victory in the Lancashire League during the 1951–52 season.

=== Notable tour matches ===
Len Constance played stand-off, and scored a goal in Wigan's 8–15 defeat by New Zealand at Central Park, Wigan on Saturday 3 November 1951.

=== Club career ===
On Thursday 20 January 1949, Leonard Constance was sold by St. Helens to Dewsbury for £2000 (based on increases in average earnings, this would be approximately £162,900 in 2013) along with Harry Street who was sold for £1000, the £3000 raised, contributed to the £4000 St. Helens paid Belle Vue Rangers for Stan McCormick, Constance made his début for Wakefield Trinity during September 1952.

== Coaching career ==
=== Club career ===
Len Constance was the coach of Dewsbury from Tuesday 10 July 1951, until 21-days later when he placed himself on the transfer list on Tuesday 31 July 1951, shortly after this he joined Wigan (as did fellow Dewsbury player; Harry Street) on-or-before Saturday 18 August 1951.

== Outside of rugby ==
Leonard Constance taught at Rivington Road School in St. Helens, where another Welsh St. Helens player, Don Gullick also taught

== Genealogical information ==
Leonard Constance's marriage to Elsie B. (née Nixon) (birth registered second ¼ 1927 in Prescot district) was registered during fourth ¼ 1948 in St. Helens district, they had children; Susan H. Constance (birth registered third ¼ 1951 (age 74–75) in St. Helens district), Gillian K. R. Constance (birth registered first ¼ 1953 (age 72–73) in St.Helens district), and Michael S. Constance (birth registered second ¼ 1956 (age 69–70) in Pontypool district).
