= George Langfield =

English rugby league footballer

Personal information
- Full name: John George Langfield
- Born: 12 January 1922 Pontefract, England
- Died: 21 May 1984 (aged 62) Beverley, England

Playing information
- Position: Fullback, Scrum-half
Club
Years	Team	Pld	T	G	FG	P
1945–52	Castleford	228	62	370	21	968
1952–53	St. Helens	55	9	205	0	437
1953–55	Hull FC
≥1955–≥55	Bramley
	Total	283	71	575	21	1405
Representative
Years	Team	Pld	T	G	FG	P
1948–49	Yorkshire	4	0	0	0	0

John George Langfield (12 January 1922 – 21 May 1984) was an English professional rugby league footballer who played in the 1940s and 1950s. He played at representative level for Yorkshire, and at club level for Castleford (captain), St. Helens, Hull FC and Bramley, as a goal-kicking scrum-half, and occasional fullback.

== Background ==
George Langfield was born in Pontefract, West Riding of Yorkshire, England, he lived in Park Dale, Pontefract [sic] (Castleford) c. 1946, and he died aged 62 in Beverley, Humberside, England.

== Playing career ==
Langfield made his début for Castleford in the 7–2 victory over Bramley at Barley Mow, Bramley on Saturday 6 April 1946, he played his last match for Castleford in the 10–29 defeat by Wakefield Trinity at Belle Vue, Wakefield on Tuesday 25 December 1951, he made his début for St. Helens in the 5–7 defeat by Whitehaven at Knowsley Road, St. Helens on Saturday 2 February 1952, and he played his last match for St. Helens in the 21–17 victory over Barrow at Knowsley Road, St. Helens on Wednesday 9 September 1953.

=== County Cup Final appearances ===
Langfield played scrum-half, and scored a goal in St. Helens' 5–22 defeat by Leigh in the 1952 Lancashire Cup Final during the 1952–53 season at Station Road, Swinton on Saturday 29 November 1952.

=== Challenge Cup Final appearances ===
Langfield played scrum-half in St. Helens' 10–15 defeat by Huddersfield in the 1953 Challenge Cup Final during the 1952–53 season at Wembley Stadium, London on Saturday 25 April 1953.

=== County honours ===
Langfield won caps playing scrum-half for Yorkshire while at Castleford in the 5–2 victory over Australia at Leeds' stadium on 24 November 1948, the 0–14 defeat by Cumberland at Workington Town's stadium on 6 April 1949, the 21–8 victory over Cumberland at Hull FC's stadium on 26 September 1949, and the 13–22 defeat by Lancashire at Warrington's stadium on 5 October 1949.
