= 1955–56 Lancashire Cup =

- Structure: Regional knockout championship
- Teams: 15
- Winners: Leigh
- Runners-up: Widnes

1955–56 was the forty-third occasion on which the Lancashire Cup completion had been held.
Leigh won the trophy by beating Widnes by the score of 26-9.
The match was played at Central Park, Wigan, (historically in the county of Lancashire). The attendance was 26,504 and receipts were £4,090.

== Background ==
The end of last season saw the demise of Belle Vue Rangers. With this and the retention of the invitation to juniors, Lancashire Amateurs the number of clubs was reduced by one to a total of 15.
The same pre-war fixture format was retained, and due to reduction in the number of clubs this resulted in one bye in the first round.
The whole tournament was again played on a knock-out basis, and there would be no return to the two legged fixtures during the life of the competition.

== Competition and results ==
=== Round 1 ===
Involved 7 matches (with one bye but no “blank” fixture) and 15 clubs

Game No	Fixture date	Home team	Score	Away team	Venue	Att	Rec	Notes	Ref
1	Sat 27 Aug 1955	Barrow	18-12	St. Helens	Craven Park	9,732			
2	Sat 27 Aug 1955	Blackpool Borough	8-18	Oldham	St Anne's Road Greyhound Stadium				
3	Sat 27 Aug 1955	Leigh	71-14	County Amateurs	Kirkhall Lane				
4	Sat 27 Aug 1955	Rochdale Hornets	26-17	Whitehaven	Athletic Grounds				
5	Sat 27 Aug 1955	Salford	8-33	Widnes	The Willows				
6	Sat 27 Aug 1955	Wigan	15-16	Warrington	Central Park				
7	Sat 27 Aug 1955	Workington Town	24-10	Liverpool City	Borough Park				
8		Swinton		bye					

=== Round 2 - quarterfinals ===
Involved 4 matches (with no bye) and 8 clubs

Game No	Fixture date	Home team	Score	Away team	Venue	Att	Rec	Notes	Ref
1	Tue 06 Sep 1955	Barrow	24-10	Workington Town	Craven Park				
2	Tue 06 Sep 1955	Rochdale Hornets	12-26	Warrington	Athletic Grounds				
3	Wed 07 Sep 1955	Oldham	11-13	Leigh	Watersheddings				
4	Thu 08 Sep 1955	Widnes	9-3	Swinton	Naughton Park				

=== Round 3 – semifinals ===
Involved 2 matches and 4 clubs

Game No	Fixture date	Home team	Score	Away team	Venue width=30 abbr="Att" |Att	Rec	Notes	Ref
1	Thu 22 Sep 1955	Barrow	7-11	Leigh	Craven Park			
2	Thu 22 Sep 1955	Widnes	11-6	Warrington	Naughton Park			

=== Final ===
Game No	Fixture date	Home team	Score	Away team	Venue	Att	Rec	Notes	Ref
	Saturday 15 October 1955	Leigh	26-9	Widnes	Central Park	26,504	£4,090	1	

==== Teams and scorers ====
Leigh	№	Widnes
	teams	
Jimmy Ledgard	1	John Sale
Bill Kindon	2	Gordon Williamson
Don Gullick	3	Harold 'Lal' Kinsey
Albert Moore	4	Tommy Galligan
Malcolm Davies	5	Peter Ratcliffe
Jack Fleming	6	Roy Butler
Brian Chadwick	7	Percy Davies
John Barton	8	Ron Rowbottom
Walt Tabern	9	Jack Hayes/J. J. Hayes
Stan Owen	10	Harold Tomlinson
Derek Hurt	11	Derek Smith/Tom Smith/Vin Smith
Mick Martyn	12	Gordon Murray
Peter Foster	13	George Kemel
26	score	9
8	HT	4
	Scorers	
	Tries	
	T	Gordon Williamson (1)
	T	
	T	
	T	
	T	
	Goals	
	G	John Sale (3)
	G	
	Drop Goals	
	DG	
Referee		

Scoring - Try = three (3) points - Goal = two (2) points - Drop goal = two (2) points

=== The road to success ===
First round
Barrow	18
St. Helens	12
Workington Town	24
Liverpool City	10
Blackpool Borough	8
Oldham	18
Leigh	71
County Amateurs	14
Salford	8
Widnes	33
Swinton
bye
Rochdale Hornets	26
Whitehaven	17
Wigan	15
Warrington	16

Second round
Barrow	24
Workington Town	10
Oldham	11
Leigh	13
Widnes	9
Swinton	3
Rochdale Hornets	12
Warrington	26

Semifinals
Barrow	7
Leigh	11
Widnes	11
Warrington	6

Final
Leigh	26
Widnes	9

== Notes and comments ==
1 * Central Park was the home ground of Wigan with a final capacity of 18,000, although the record attendance was 47,747 for Wigan v St Helens 27 March 1959

== See also ==
- 1955–56 Northern Rugby Football League season
- Rugby league county cups
