= St Helens R.F.C. Hall of Fame =

St Helens R.F.C. Hall of Fame honours past players of St Helens since its inception in 1873.

== Members ==
The forty-five strong hall of fame is:

- Jack Arkwright – SR
- Frank Barrow – PR
- Billy Benyon – CE
- Tommy Bishop – SH
- Frank Carlton – WG
- Eric Chisnall – PR
- Harry Cook – CE
- Kel Coslett – FB
- Bob Dagnall – HK
- Bernard Dwyer – SR
- Alf Ellaby – WG
- Les Fairclough – FB
- Ray French – SR
- Doug Greenall – WG
- Jeff Heaton – SH
- Neil Holding – SH
- Dick Huddart – SR
- Les Jones – WG
- Chris Joynt – SR
- Tony Karalius – HK
- Vince Karalius – LF
- Len Killeen – WG
- Barry Ledger – WG
- Steve Llewellyn – FB
- Paul Loughlin – CE
- John Mantle – SR
- Tommy Martyn – SO
- Roy Mathias – WG
- Stan McCormick – WG
- Glyn Moses – FB
- Alex Murphy – SH
- Paul Newlove – CE
- George Nicholls – LF
- George Parsons – SR
- Geoff Pimblett – FB
- Harry Pinner – LF
- Alan Prescott – PR
- Austin Rhodes – FB
- Wilf Smith – WG
- Jim Stott – CE
- Jim Sullivan – FB
- Abe Terry – WG
- Tom van Vollenhoven – WG
- John Warlow – PR
- Cliff Watson – PR
