= 1952–53 Lancashire Cup =

- Structure: Regional knockout championship
- Teams: 14
- Winners: Leigh
- Runners-up: St. Helens

The 1952–53 Lancashire Cup was the fortieth occasion on which the Lancashire Cup competition was held.

Leigh won the trophy by beating St. Helens by the score of 22–5.
The match was played at Station Road, (historically in the county of Lancashire). The attendance was 34,785 and receipts were £5,793.

== Background ==
Overall, the number of teams entering this year's competition remained the same as last year's total of 14
The same pre-war fixture format was retained. This season saw no bye but one "blank" or "dummy" fixture in the first round. There was also one bye but no "blank" fixture in the second round.

As last season, all the first round matches of the competition will be played on the basis of two legged, home and away, ties – and the remainder of the rounds remaining on straight forward knock-out basis.

== Competition and results ==
=== Round 1 – first leg ===
Involved 7 matches (with no bye and one "blank" fixture) and 14 clubs

Game No	Fixture date	Home team	Score	Away team	Venue	agg	Att	Rec	Notes	Ref
1	Sat 30 Aug 1952	Barrow	21–24	St. Helens	Craven Park		12,000			
2	Sat 30 Aug 1952	Oldham	25–6	Swinton	Watersheddings					
3	Sat 30 Aug 1952	Liverpool City	14–58	Workington Town	Mill Yard, Knotty Ash					
4	Sat 30 Aug 1952	Rochdale Hornets	21–16	Belle Vue Rangers	Athletic Grounds					
5	Sat 30 Aug 1952	Salford	17–19	Warrington	The Willows					
6	Sat 30 Aug 1952	Whitehaven	4–15	Leigh	Recreation Ground					
7	Sat 30 Aug 1952	Widnes	15–24	Wigan	Naughton Park					
8		blank		blank						

=== Round 1 – second leg ===
Involved 7 matches (with no bye and one "blank" fixture) and 14 clubs. These are the reverse fixture from the first leg

Game No	Fixture date	Home team	Score	Away team	Venue	agg	Att	Rec	Notes	Ref
1	Wed 03 Sep 1952	St. Helens	23–5	Barrow	Knowsley Road	47–26	19,000			
2	Wed 03 Sep 1952	Swinton	18–19	Oldham	Station Road	24–44				
3	Mon 01 Sep 1952	Workington Town	29–18	Liverpool City	Borough Park	87–32				
4	Mon 01 Sep 1952	Belle Vue Rangers	7–17	Rochdale Hornets	Belle Vue Stadium	23–38				
5	Wed 03 Sep 1952	Warrington	30–8	Salford	Wilderspool	49–25				
6	Wed 03 Sep 1952	Leigh	43–2	Whitehaven	Kirkhall Lane	58–6				
7	Wed 03 Sep 1952	Wigan	38–5	Widnes	Central Park	62–20				
8		blank		blank						

=== Round 2 – quarterfinals ===
Involved 3 matches (with one bye) and 7 clubs

Game No	Fixture date	Home team	Score	Away team	Venue	agg	Att	Rec	Notes	Ref
1	Mon 22 Sep 1952	Leigh	19–8	Wigan	Kirkhall Lane					
2	Tue 23 Sep 1952	St. Helens	31–7	Rochdale Hornets	Knowsley Road		16,957			
3	Wed 24 Sep 1952	Workington Town	13–10	Oldham	Borough Park					
4		Warrington		bye						

=== Round 3 – semifinals ===
Involved 2 matches and 4 clubs

Game No	Fixture date	Home team	Score	Away team	Venue	agg	Att	Rec	Notes	Ref
1	Mon 13 Oct 1952	Workington Town	9–13	Leigh	Borough Park					
2	Tue 14 Oct 1952	Warrington	10–17	St. Helens	Wilderspool		28,800			

=== Final ===
Game No	Fixture date	Home team	Score	Away team	Venue	agg	Att	Rec	Notes	Ref
	Saturday 29 November 1952	Leigh	22–5	St. Helens	Station Road		34,785	£5,793	1 2	

==== Teams and scorers ====
Leigh	№	St. Helens
	Teams	
Jimmy Ledgard	1	Jimmy Lowe
Brian Chadwick	2	Steve Llewellyn
Trevor Allan	3	Doug Greenall
Edward Kerwick	4	Don Gullick
Frank Kitchen	5	Stan McCormick
Ken Baxter	6	Jimmy Honey
Tommy Bradshaw	7	George Langfield
Harry Edden	8	Alan Prescott
Joe Egan	9	Reg Blakemore
Stan Owen	10	Bill Whittaker
Charlie Pawsey	11	George Parsons
Rex Mossop	12	Bill Bretherton
Peter Foster	13	Ray Cale
Joe Egan	coach	
22	score	5
15	HT	2
	Scorers	
	Tries	
	T	Don Gullick (1)
	T	
	T	
	T	
	Goals	
	G	George Langfield (1)
	G	
	Drop Goals	
	DG	
Referee		

Scoring – Try = three (3) points – Goal = two (2) points – Drop goal = two (2) points

=== Bracket ===
All the first round ties were played on a two leg (home and away) basis.
The first club named in each of the first round ties played the first leg at home.

First round
Liverpool City	14	18	32
Workington Town	58	29	87
Oldham	25	19	44
Swinton	6	18	24
Whitehaven	4	2	6
Leigh	15	43	58
Widnes	15	5	20
Wigan	24	38	62
Salford	17	8	25
Warrington	19	30	49
blank
blank
Barrow	21	5	26
St. Helens	24	23	47
Rochdale Hornets	21	17	38
Belle Vue Rangers	16	7	23

Second round
Workington Town	13
Oldham	10
Leigh	19
Wigan	8
Warrington
bye
St. Helens	31
Rochdale Hornets	7

Semifinals
Workington Town	9
Leigh	13
Warrington	10
St. Helens	17

Final
Leigh	22
St. Helens	5

== Notes and comments ==
1 * Attendance given in official St. Helens archives as 34,541 – data given in Rothmans Rugby League Yearbook 1991 as 34,785
2 * Station Road was the home ground of Swinton from 1929 to 1932 and at its peak was one of the finest rugby league grounds in the country and it boasted a capacity of 60,000. The actual record attendance was for the Challenge Cup semi-final on 7 April 1951 when 44,621 watched Wigan beat Warrington 3–2

== See also ==
- 1952–53 Northern Rugby Football League season
- Rugby league county cups
