= Reg Blakemore =

Wales international rugby union & league footballer

Personal information
- Full name: Reginald Edward Blakemore
- Born: 1 September 1924; Newport, Wales
- Died: 20 June 2006 (aged 81); Parr, St Helens, England

Playing information
- Weight: 12 st 0 lb (76 kg)

Rugby union
- Position: Hooker
Club
Years	Team	Pld	T	G	FG	P
≤1947–47	Newport RFC
Representative
Years	Team	Pld	T	G	FG	P
1947	Wales	1	0	0	0	0

Rugby league
- Position: Hooker
Club
Years	Team	Pld	T	G	FG	P
1947–54	St Helens	187	20	0	0	60

Reginald "Reg" Edward Blakemore (1 September 1924 – 20 June 2006) was a Welsh rugby union, and professional rugby league footballer who played in the 1940s and 1950s. He played representative level rugby union (RU) for Wales, and at club level for Newport RFC, as a hooker, and club level rugby league for St Helens, as a hooker.

== Background ==
Reg Blakemore was born in Newport, Wales, and he died aged 81 in Parr, St. Helens, Lancashire, England.

== Playing career ==
=== Rugby union ===
Reg Blakemore won a cap for Wales (RU) while at Newport RFC in 1947 against England.

=== Rugby league ===
Reg Blakemore played hooker in St Helens' 10–15 defeat by Huddersfield in the 1953 Challenge Cup Final during the 1952–53 season at Wembley Stadium, London on Saturday 25 April 1953.

Reg Blakemore played hooker in St Helens' 5–22 defeat by Leigh in the 1952 Lancashire Cup Final during the 1952–53 season at Station Road, Swinton on Saturday 29 November 1952, and in the 16–8 victory over Wigan in the 1953 Lancashire Cup Final during the 1953–54 season at Station Road, Swinton on Saturday 24 October 1953.
