= Dai Moses =

Welsh rugby union and rugby league footballer

David Moses
Personal information
- Born: c. 1925 Bridgend district, Wales
- Died: 1999

Playing information

Rugby union
Club
| Years | Team | Pld | T | G | FG | P |
|---|---|---|---|---|---|---|
| 1945 | Maesteg RFC |

Rugby league
- Position: Prop, Second-row, Loose forward
Club
| Years | Team | Pld | T | G | FG | P |
|---|---|---|---|---|---|---|
| 1945–58 | Salford | 328 | 29 | 4 |
| 1958–61 | Swinton | 88 | 6 | 0 | 0 | 18 |
| | Total | 416 | 35 | 4 | 0 | 18 |
Representative
| Years | Team | Pld | T | G | FG | P |
| 1959 | Wales | 1 |

Coaching information
Club
| Years | Team | Gms | W | D | L | W% |
| 1967–68 | Swinton |
- Relatives: Glyn Moses (brother)

David "Dai" Moses (c. 1925 – 1999) was a Welsh rugby union and professional rugby league footballer who played in the 1940s, 1950s and 1960s, and coached rugby league in the 1960s. He played club level rugby union (RU) for Maesteg, and representative level rugby league (RL) for Wales, and at club level for Salford and Swinton, as a prop, second-row, or loose forward, and coached club level rugby league for Swinton.

== Background ==
Dai Moses was born in Nant-y-moel, Wales, his birth was registered in Bridgend district, Wales.

== Playing career ==
=== International honours ===
Moses won a cap for Wales (RL) while at Swinton in 1959 against France at Stade des Minimes, Toulouse on Sunday 1 March 1959.

=== County Cup Final appearances ===
Moses played at prop in Swinton's 9-15 defeat by St. Helens in the 1960–61 Lancashire County Cup Final during the 1960–61 season at Central Park, Wigan on Saturday 29 October 1960.

== Personal life ==
Dai Moses was the older brother of the rugby union and rugby league footballer; Glyn Moses.
