= Ted Kerwick =

Former England international rugby league footballer

Personal information
- Full name: Edward Kerwick
- Born: 17 June 1922 St. Helens, England
- Died: 19 July 2010 (aged 88) Windle, St. Helens, England

Playing information
- Position: Centre, Stand-off
Club
Years	Team	Pld	T	G	FG	P
1938–39	St. Helens Recs
1939–46	Oldham	44	9	0		27
1942	→ Wigan (guest)	14	3	0	0	9
1942	→ St Helens (guest)	1	0	0	0	0
1946–53	Leigh	202	71	0	0	213
	Workington Town RLFC
1954–55	Widnes	13	0	0		0
	Total	274	83	0	0	249
Representative
Years	Team	Pld	T	G	FG	P
≥1946–≤53	Lancashire
1949	England	1	0	0	0	0

Edward Kerwick (17 June 1922 – 19 July 2010) was an English professional rugby league footballer who played in the 1930s, 1940s and 1950s. He played at representative level for England and Lancashire, and at club level for St. Helens Recs, Oldham, Wigan (World War II guest), St Helens (World War II guest), Leigh, Workington and Widnes, as a centre or stand-off. He served with the Royal Artillery during World War II.

== Background ==
Kerwick was born in St. Helens, Lancashire, and he died aged 88 in Windle, St. Helens, Merseyside.

== Playing career ==
=== Club career ===
Kerwick played at centre in Leigh's 7–20 defeat by Wigan in the 1949 Lancashire Cup Final during the 1949–50 season at Wilderspool Stadium, Warrington on Saturday 29 October 1949, played stand-off in the 6–14 defeat by Wigan in the 1951 Lancashire Cup Final during the 1951–52 season at Station Road, Swinton on Saturday 27 October 1951, and played at centre in the 22–5 victory over St. Helens in the 1952 Lancashire Cup Final during the 1952–53 season at Station Road, Swinton on Saturday 29 November 1952.

=== International honours ===
Kerwick won a cap for England while at Leigh in 1949 against Other Nationalities.
