= Joseph Mahoney =

Wales international rugby league & union footballer

Personal information
- Full name: Joseph Mahoney
- Born: unknown Wales

Playing information

Rugby union
- Position: Centre
Club
Years	Team	Pld	T	G	FG	P
1945/46–46/47	Cardiff RFC	15	10	0	0	30

Rugby league
- Position: Centre
Club
Years	Team	Pld	T	G	FG	P
1946–49	Oldham	67	14	0	0	42
1949–≥50	Dewsbury
	Total	67	14	0	0	42
Representative
Years	Team	Pld	T	G	FG	P
1948–50	Wales	5

Joseph "Joe" Mahoney (birth unknown) is a Welsh former rugby union and professional rugby league footballer who played in the 1940s and 1950s. He played club level rugby union (RU) for Cardiff RFC, as a centre, and representative level rugby league (RL) for Wales, and at club level for Oldham and Dewsbury, as a centre.

He is the father of footballer John Mahoney.

== International honours ==
Joe Mahoney won 5 caps for Wales (RL) in 1948–1950 while at Oldham, and Dewsbury.
