= Peter Foster (rugby league) =

English RL coach and former GB international rugby league footballer

Personal information
- Full name: Peter Foster
- Born: c. 1933
- Died: 6 December 1958 (aged 25) St Helens, Lancashire, England

Playing information
- Position: Loose forward
Club
Years	Team	Pld	T	G	FG	P
1951–58	Leigh	236	15	2	0	49
Representative
Years	Team	Pld	T	G	FG	P
1951–57	Lancashire	10	0	0	0	0
1955	Great Britain	4	0	0	0	0

Coaching information
Club
Years	Team	Gms	W	D	L	W%
1957–58	Leigh	0	0	0	0

Peter Foster was a professional rugby league footballer who played in the 1950s. He played at representative level for Great Britain, and at club level for Leigh, as a loose forward.

== Playing career ==
=== Club career ===
Foster played loose forward in Leigh's 6–14 defeat by Wigan in the 1951 Lancashire Cup final at Station Road, Swinton on Saturday 27 October 1951. He played in two further Lancashire Cup finals, helping the club defeat St Helens 22–5 at Swinton in the 1952 Lancashire Cup final, and winning 26–9 against Widnes in the 1955 Lancashire Cup final at Wigan.

In October 1957, he was appointed as player-coach of the club. Between 1951 and 1958, he made 236 appearances for Leigh, scoring 15 tries.

=== International honours ===
Foster won caps for Great Britain while at Leigh in 1955 against New Zealand (3 matches).

Foster also represented Great Britain while at Leigh between 1952 and 1956 against France (1 non-Test match).

== Death ==
Foster died in a car crash in St Helens on 6 December 1958.
