= Jackie Fleming =

English RL coach and former England international rugby league footballer

Jack Fleming
Personal information
- Full name: John Fleming
- Born: 30 October 1921; Wigan, England
- Died: 9 July 1972 (aged 50); Liverpool, England

Playing information
- Position: Wing, Centre, Stand-off
Club
Years	Team	Pld	T	G	FG	P
1941–46	Wigan	70	24	0	0	72
1943–44	→ Batley (guest)	17	7	0	0	21
1947–49	Warrington	104	26	0	0	78
1950–52	Widnes	82	12	0	0	36
1952–54	Wigan	58	13	0	0	39
1955	Leigh	6	2	0	0	6
	Total	337	84	0	0	252
Representative
Years	Team	Pld	T	G	FG	P
1948–51	England	6	1	0	0	3
1948	Lancashire	2	0	0	0	0

Coaching information
Club
Years	Team	Gms	W	D	L	W%
1967–68	Warrington	67	41	1	25	61

John Fleming (30 October 1921 – 9 July 1972) was an English professional rugby league footballer who played in the 1940s and 1950s, and coached in the 1960s. He played at representative level for England, and at club level for Wigan (two spells), Batley (World War II guest), Warrington, and Widnes, as a wing, centre, or stand-off, and coached at club level for Warrington.

== Background ==
Jackie Fleming was born in Wigan, Lancashire, England, and he died aged 50 in Liverpool, England.

== Playing career ==
=== Wigan ===
Fleming played on the wing in Wigan's 13–9 victory over Dewsbury in the Championship Final first-leg during the 1943–44 season at Central Park, Wigan on Saturday 13 May 1944, and played on the wing in the 12–5 victory over Dewsbury in the Championship Final second-leg during the 1943–44 season at Crown Flatt, Dewsbury on Saturday 20 May 1944.

=== Warrington ===
Fleming made his début for Warrington on Saturday 1 February 1947, and he played his last match for Warrington on Monday 26 December 1949. He played stand-off in Warrington's 15–5 victory over Bradford Northern in the Championship Final during the 1947–48 season at Maine Road, Manchester.

=== Widnes ===
Fleming played stand-off in Widnes' 0–19 defeat by Warrington in the 1949–50 Challenge Cup Final during the 1949–50 season at Wembley Stadium, London on Saturday 6 May 1950.

=== Leigh ===
Fleming finished his career with Leigh. He won the 1955 Lancashire Cup final with the club, having been on the losing side on his previous three Lancashire Cup final appearances.

=== International honours ===
Jackie Fleming won caps for England while at Warrington in 1948 against France (2 matches), and Wales, in 1949 against Wales, and France, and while at Widnes 1951 against France.
