= Harry Street (rugby league) =

English rugby league coach (1927–2002)

Personal information
- Full name: Harry Street
- Born: 5 September 1927 Castleford, England
- Died: 29 September 2002 (aged 75) Huddersfield, England

Playing information
- Position: Centre, Loose forward
Club
Years	Team	Pld	T	G	FG	P
1945(guest)	→ Castleford	1
1945–49	St. Helens	32	3	0	0	9
1949–51	Dewsbury
1951–55	Wigan	163	32	0	0	96
1955–57	Leeds	75	11	1	0	35
1958	Featherstone Rovers	12	0	0	0	0
	Total	283	46	1	0	140
Representative
Years	Team	Pld	T	G	FG	P
1949–53	Yorkshire	3	1	0	0	3
1950–53	England	6	1	0	0	3
1950	Great Britain	4	0	0	0	0

Coaching information
Club
Years	Team	Gms	W	D	L	W%
1958–64	Castleford	269	137	8	124	51
1965–67	Keighley	0	0	0	0
1970–72	Bradford Northern	0	0	0	0
	Total	269	137	8	124	51

Harry Street (5 September 1927 – 29 September 2002) was an English professional rugby league footballer who played in the 1940s and 1950s, and coached in the 1950s, 1960s and 1970s. He played at representative level for Great Britain, England and Yorkshire, and at club level for Castleford (World War II guest), St. Helens, Dewsbury, Wigan, Leeds and Featherstone Rovers, as a centre or loose forward, and coached at club level for Castleford and Bradford Northern,

== Background ==
Harry Street was born in Castleford, West Riding of Yorkshire, England, and he died aged 75 in Huddersfield, West Yorkshire, England.

== Playing career ==
=== Early club career ===
St. Helens spotted Harry Street as an 18-year-old playing rugby union whilst stationed with the Army in Chepstow, and signed him as a centre, which was his regular position until an accident at work at one of the town's many glassworks broke his foot and deprived him of some of his pace. On Thursday 20 January 1949, Harry Street was transferred from St. Helens to Dewsbury for £1,000 along with Leonard Constance who was sold for £2,000, the £3,000 raised, contributed to the £4,000 St. Helens paid to Belle Vue Rangers for Stan McCormick.

=== Wigan ===
Street played loose forward, in Wigan's 13-6 victory over Bradford Northern in the Championship Final during the 1951–52 season at Leeds Road, Huddersfield on Saturday 10 May 1952.

Street played in Wigan's victory in the Lancashire League during the 1951–52 season .

Street played loose forward, in Wigan's 14-6 victory over Leigh in the 1951–52 Lancashire Cup Final during the 1951–52 season at Station Road, Swinton on Saturday 27 October 1951, and played loose forward, and scored a try in the 8-16 defeat by St. Helens in the 1953–54 Lancashire Cup Final during the 1953–54 season at Station Road, Swinton on Saturday 24 October 1953.

Harry Street played loose forward, and scored a try in Wigan's 8-15 defeat by New Zealand at Central Park, Wigan on Saturday 3 November 1951, and scored a try in the 13–23 defeat by Australia at Central Park, Wigan on Wednesday 24 September 1952.

=== Leeds and Featherstone Rovers ===
Street played loose forward, in Leeds' 9-7 victory over Barrow in the 1956–57 Challenge Cup Final during the 1956–57 season at Wembley Stadium, London on Saturday 11 May 1957, in front of a crowd of 76,318.

Street made his début for Featherstone Rovers on Saturday 8 February 1958.

=== International honours ===
Harry Street won caps for England while at Dewsbury in 1950 against Wales (2 matches), and France, while at Wigan in 1951 against France, in 1952 against Wales, in 1953 against France, and won caps for Great Britain while at Dewsbury in 1950 against Australia (3 matches), and New Zealand.

Only five players have played test matches for Great Britain as both a back, and a forward, they are; Colin Dixon, Frank Gallagher, Laurie Gilfedder, Billy Jarman, and Harry Street.

== Coaching career ==
Harry Street was the coach of Castleford, his first game in charge was on Saturday 16 August 1958, and his last game in charge was on Monday 28 December 1964.

In November 1970, Street was appointed as coach at Bradford Northern until the end of the season, but his contract was extended a few months later following a good run of form for the club. In 1971–72, Street led the club to a 2nd place finish in the league table, and reached the semi-finals of the Championship playoffs. The following season was less successful, and Street left the club by mutual consent in December 1972.
