= Mark Field (rugby league) =

English rugby league footballer

Personal information
- Full name: Mark Field
- Born: 21 March 1984 (age 42) Rothwell, England

Playing information
- Height: 6 ft 1 in (1.85 m)
- Weight: 13 st 8 lb (86 kg)
- Position: Fullback, Wing, Centre
Club
Years	Team	Pld	T	G	FG	P
2003–07	Wakefield Trinity	37	3	0	0	12
2008	Dewsbury Rams	8	3	0	0	12
	Total	45	6	0	0	24

Mark Field (born 21 March 1984) is an English former rugby league footballer who played in the 2000s. He played at club level for the Wakefield Trinity Wildcats, and Dewsbury Rams, as a fullback, wing or centre.

== Outside of rugby league ==
Mark attended Royds High School in Leeds.
