= Glyn Moses =

GB & Wales international rugby league footballer (1928–2021)

Personal information
- Full name: Arthur Glyn Moses
- Born: 30 May 1928 Nant-y-Moel, Wales
- Died: 29 September 2021 (aged 93)

Playing information
- Height: 5 ft 9 in (1.75 m)
- Weight: 12 st 4 lb (78 kg; 172 lb)

Rugby union
Club
| Years | Team | Pld | T | G | FG | P |
|---|---|---|---|---|---|---|
| | Newbridge RFC |
| | Maesteg RFC |
| | Total | 0 | 0 | 0 | 0 | 0 |

Rugby league
- Position: Fullback
Club
| Years | Team | Pld | T | G | FG | P |
|---|---|---|---|---|---|---|
| 1949–51 | Salford |
| 1952–59 | St. Helens | 259 | 44 | 0 | 0 | 132 |
| | Total | 259 | 44 | 0 | 0 | 132 |
Representative
| Years | Team | Pld | T | G | FG | P |
| 1957 | Great Britain & France | 1 |
| 1953 | Wales | 2 |
| 1955 | Other Nationalities | 2 |
| 1955 | Great Britain | 9 |
- Relatives: Dai Moses (brother)

Arthur Glyn Moses (30 May 1928– 29 September 2021) was a Welsh rugby union and professional rugby league footballer who played in the 1940s and 1950s. He played club level rugby union (RU) for Newbridge RFC and Maesteg RFC, and representative level rugby league (RL) for Great Britain, Wales, Other Nationalities, and Great Britain & France, and at club level for Salford and St. Helens, as a fullback.

== Background ==
Glyn Moses was born in Nant-y-Moel, Wales.

== Playing career ==
=== International honours ===
Glyn Moses represented Great Britain & France in the 37-31 victory over New Zealand at Carlaw Park, Auckland on 3 July 1957, won caps for Wales (RL) while at St. Helens in 1953 against England and France, won caps for Other Nationalities (RL) while at St. Helens in 1955 against England and France, and won caps for Great Britain (RL) while at St. Helens in 1955 against New Zealand (2 matches), in 1956 against Australia, in 1957 against France (3 matches), and in the 1957 Rugby League World Cup against France, Australia, and New Zealand.

=== Challenge Cup Final appearances ===
Glyn Moses played fullback in St. Helens' 10-15 defeat by Huddersfield in the 1953 Challenge Cup Final during the 1952–53 season at Wembley Stadium, London on Saturday 25 April 1953, in front of a crowd of 89,588, and played fullback in the 13-2 victory over Halifax in the 1955–56 Challenge Cup Final during the 1955–56 season at Wembley Stadium, London on Saturday 28 April 1956, in front of a crowd of 79,341.

=== County Cup Final appearances ===
Glyn Moses played fullback, and scored a try in St. Helens' 16-8 victory over Wigan in the 1953 Lancashire Cup Final during the 1953–54 season at Station Road, Swinton on Saturday 24 October 1953, and played fullback in the 3-10 defeat by Oldham in the 1956 Lancashire Cup Final during the 1956–57 season at Central Park, Wigan on Saturday 20 October 1956.

== Honoured at St Helens R.F.C. ==
Glyn Moses is a St Helens RFC Hall of Fame inductee.

== Personal life ==
Glyn Moses was the younger brother of the rugby union, and rugby league footballer; Dai Moses.

Moses died on 29 September 2021, at the age of 93.
