= 1952–53 Northern Rugby Football League season =

Rugby league

1952–53 Rugby Football League season
- League: Northern Rugby Football League
- Champions: St. Helens
- League Leaders: St. Helens
- Top point-scorer(s): Harry Bath 379
- Top try-scorer(s): Brian Bevan 72

The 1952–53 Rugby Football League season was the 58th season of rugby league football.

== Season summary ==
St. Helens won their second Rugby Football League Championship when they beat Halifax 24–14 in the play-off final. They also ended the regular season as league leaders.

The Challenge Cup Winners were Huddersfield who beat St. Helens 15–10 in the final.

Cardiff dropped out of the league.

St. Helens won the Lancashire League, and Halifax won the Yorkshire League. Leigh beat St. Helens 22–5 to win the Lancashire County Cup, and Huddersfield beat Batley 18–8 to win the Yorkshire County Cup.

== Championship ==
	Team	Pld	W	D	L	PF	PA	Pts
1	St. Helens	36	32	2	2	769	273	66
2	Halifax	36	29	2	5	620	309	60
3	Bradford Northern	36	28	0	8	700	329	56
4	Huddersfield	36	27	2	7	747	366	56
5	Barrow	36	27	1	8	585	322	55
6	Leeds	36	24	0	12	690	452	48
7	Leigh	36	23	2	11	556	377	48
8	Oldham	36	22	2	12	599	280	46
9	Warrington	36	20	1	15	733	486	41
10	Whitehaven	36	19	3	14	465	486	41
11	Wigan	36	19	2	15	673	414	40
12	Hunslet	36	20	0	16	485	358	40
13	Salford	36	20	0	16	508	441	40
14	Swinton	36	18	0	18	441	401	36
15	Hull	36	17	2	17	461	451	36
16	Workington Town	36	16	2	18	453	460	34
17	Keighley	36	16	1	19	465	547	33
18	Wakefield Trinity	36	16	0	20	410	595	32
19	Dewsbury	36	15	1	20	410	440	31
20	Castleford	36	15	0	21	392	502	30
21	Batley	36	14	2	20	405	579	30
22	Rochdale Hornets	36	13	3	20	443	536	29
23	Widnes	36	13	2	21	336	478	28
24	Featherstone Rovers	36	12	1	23	415	535	25
25	York	36	10	0	26	370	496	20
26	Doncaster	36	10	0	26	377	665	20
27	Belle Vue Rangers	36	10	0	26	301	705	20
28	Hull Kingston Rovers	36	9	1	26	337	646	19
29	Bramley	36	6	0	30	293	898	12
30	Liverpool City	36	4	0	32	225	837	8

Play-offs

=== Play-off ===
Semi-finals
1	St. Helens	46
4	Huddersfield	0
2	Halifax	18
3	Bradford Northern	16

Championship final
St. Helens	24
Halifax	14

1 May 1953

St Helens	24 – 14	Halifax
Tries: Blakemore (2), Moses, Greenall, Metcalfe, Cale; Goals: Metcalfe (3)		Tries: Lynch, Wilkinson; Goals: Griffiths (4)

Maine Road, Manchester
Attendance: 51,083
Referee: A. Hill (Dewsbury)

St Helens	Number	Halifax
	Teams	
Glyn Moses	1	Tuss Griffiths
Steve Llewellyn	2	Brian Vierod
Duggie Greenall	3	Tommy Lynch
Don Gullick	4	Martin Creeney
Stan McCormick	5	Terry Cook
Peter Metcalfe	6	Ken Dean
John Dickinson	7	Stan Kielty
Alan Prescott	8	Mike Condon
Reg Blakemore	9	Alvin Ackerley
George Parr	10	Jack Wilkinson
George Parsons	11	Harry Greenwood
Bill Bretherton	12	Albert Fearnley
Ray Cale	13	Des Clarkson
Jim Sullivan	Coach	

== Challenge Cup ==
A club record 69,429 people watch the Challenge Cup 3rd Round tie at Odsal between Bradford Northern and Huddersfield. Larger crowds had watched matches at Odsal, but this was the largest involving the home side.

In the Final, Huddersfield beat St. Helens 15–10 at Wembley in front of a crowd of 89,588. This produced a record gate taking for a Challenge Cup final of £31,000.

This was Huddersfield’s sixth Cup Final win in seven Final appearances, including one win during the Second World War. Peter Ramsden, their stand-off half, became the youngest player to win the Lance Todd Trophy for man-of-the-match at 19. the Huddersfield team also featured Australian Pat Devery and New Zealand's Peter Henderson.

== Sources ==
- 1952-53 Rugby Football League season at Wigan.rlfans.com
- The Challenge Cup at The Rugby Football League website
