= Dewsbury Rams =

English rugby league club, based in Dewsbury, West Yorkshire

Club information
- Full name: Dewsbury Rams Rugby League Football Club
- Nickname: Rams
- Short name: Dewsbury Rams
- Colours: Red, Amber and Black
- Founded: 1898; 128 years ago
- Website: dewsburyrams.co.uk

Current details
- Ground: Autex Acoustics Arena (5,100)
- Chairman: Mark Sawyer
- Coach: Paul March
- Captain: George Senior
- Competition: Championship
- 2026 season: 11th
- Current season

Uniforms
Home colours

Records
- Championships: 1 (1973)
- Challenge Cups: 2 (1912, 1943)
- Other top-tier honours: 4

The Dewsbury Rams are a professional rugby league club based in Dewsbury, West Yorkshire, England that compete in RFL Championship, the second tier of British rugby league.

== History ==
=== 1875–1887: Dewsbury Athletic and Football Club ===
The idea of establishing a rugby football club in Dewsbury originated among a few friends at a meeting at the Little Saddle Inn in 1875. Established with immediate effect, Dewsbury Athletic and Football Club enrolled between 30 and 40 members.

On 20 November 1875, the first recorded match of Dewsbury Athletic and Football Club took place when they played Heckmondwike Church Society XV and lost by one goal, six tries and eight touch downs to nil. The first home game, it is generally held, took place on 4 December 1875 in a field off Sugar Lane, opposite the future Crown Flatt. In a 13-a-side "scratch" game, the two outfits – one selected by the Captain and the other by the Vice-Captain – fought out a draw. The club soon realised they needed a ground and the following year secured a sub tenancy at Crown Flatt for £200.

During the course of the 1879–80 season the club colours changed from blue and cardinal to black, crimson and yellow.

On 27 March 1880, the Yorkshire Cup semi-final against Wakefield Trinity drew an estimated 16,000 supporters to Crown Flatt which the local newspaper claimed to be the largest assemblage ever seen on a football ground in Yorkshire.

1881 saw the club's first success in the Yorkshire Challenge Cup beating Huddersfield, Bradford and Halifax before an Alfred Newsome drop goal gave them victory over Wakefield Trinity in the final.

When York F.C. paid a visit to Crown Flatt on 25 September 1886, the home team took to the field wearing white jerseys that incorporated the borough's coat of arms.

=== 1888–1897: Dewsbury and Savile Cricket and Football Club ===
Crown Flatt was rapidly gaining the reputation as one of the best-equipped ground in Yorkshire. This was further enhanced when the club purchased the famous "Noah's Ark" stand at a cost of £250. In 1888, the club amalgamated with Savile Cricket Club and United Clerks' Cricket Club to form Dewsbury and Savile Cricket and Football Club.

After the 1890-91 season, Dewsbury along with other Yorkshire Senior clubs Batley, Bradford, Brighouse, Halifax, Huddersfield, Hull, Hunslet, Leeds, Liversedge, Manningham and Wakefield decided that they wanted their own county league starting in 1891 along the lines of a similar competition that had been played in Lancashire. The clubs wanted full control of the league but the Yorkshire Rugby Football Union would not sanction the competition as it meant giving up control of rugby football to the senior clubs.

The Yorkshire Senior Competition was formed in 1892 and Dewsbury immediately became members. They made their Senior Competition début at Liversedge on 10 September 1892, Dewsbury were beaten 2–10. The club struggled and finished in the bottom three due to financial problems. The arrival of competitive leagues meant that attendances were increasing connected to on-field success. Dewsbury failed to adapt to the new era: attendances from then onwards topped 2,000 only on rare occasions.

By 1895, Dewsbury were sporting blue and white. At the famous meeting at the George Hotel in Huddersfield, Dewsbury were the only members of the Yorkshire Senior Competition not to resign from the Rugby Football Union instead requesting permission to consult further. At a special meeting convened at the King's Arms Hotel, Market Place, on 2 September, they elected to remain in the Senior Competition. It was not a popular decision. A local journalist reported that 'there wasn't a single supporter who wouldn't say "Let us have the Northern Union and the sooner the better".' Dewsbury marginally improved their position in the league to 10th. Next season, however they were back at the bottom.

On 22 November 1897, the General Committee of Dewsbury and Savile Cricket and Football Club elected to abandon rugby union with immediate effect. Of the 12 league matches contested by the club that season, all but one – and that a draw – were lost. In reply to the 156 points conceded, the team registered just two tries. The 0–5 loss to Otley on 13 November 1897 was the final rugby union game played at Crown Flatt. By the time of its demise, the football section had contested more than 500 matches. They withdrew from the league concentrating on football instead.

=== 1898–1910: Dewsbury R.L.F.C. ===
On 21 April 1898, a historic meeting was held at the Black Bull public house to consider the possibility of forming a new Northern Union club. The question was discussed at some length and over £100 in donations was promised. Ironically it was local rivals Batley who helped Dewsbury gain election to the Northern Union. They were fully supportive of Dewsbury's bid and obviously looked forward to rekindling the rivalry, as well as their pockets, with the derby matches and also to thank the old Dewsbury supporters who had switched their support to Batley's Mount Pleasant ground during the two or three preceding seasons.

At a subsequent discussion at the parish church school on 5 May, it was announced that members of the committee had met with Mr Lipscomb, agent to Lord Savile, and had signed an agreement to lease the Crown Flatt estate as from 1 July 1898. Red, amber and black were adopted as club's colours during June 1898.

On 3 September 1898, the players travelled to Normanton for their Northern Union match, they were beaten 3–16. The first home game took place the very next Saturday with visitors Kinsley emerging victorious by a margin of 13–5. During the rest of the season the team played in Yorkshire No. 2 Competition.

In 1901–02 the Lancashire and Yorkshire leagues were combined to form a second division. Dewsbury was one of the new teams to join the second division.

=== 1910–1944: Early success ===
The club's first major success came in 1912, when they beat Oldham 8–5 in the Challenge Cup Final at Headingley. Dewsbury were even more successful, finishing champions in the 1915–16 and 1916–17 seasons; attracting players and crowds due to the town’s prominence as a manufacturer of woollen cloth for uniforms.

They beat the visiting Australasian team of the 1921–22 Kangaroo tour of Great Britain 13–6. When, in 1922, the Northern Union renamed itself the Rugby Football League, the club adopted the title of Dewsbury Rugby Football Club.

In 1929, Dewsbury also had the honour of playing in the first Wembley Challenge Cup final, losing 13–2 to Wigan.

Managed by Eddie Waring, Dewsbury enjoyed huge success during the Second World War when their side was boosted by the inclusion of a number of big-name guest players. Dewsbury won the Wartime Emergency League in 1941–42 and again the following season, though that championship was declared null and void when it was discovered they had played an ineligible player. They were also runners-up in 1943–44.

=== Post Second World War ===
Vic Hey was player/coach at Dewsbury from 1944–47. In the first full season after the war, a new record transfer fee of £1,650 was set when Dewsbury bought fullback Bill Davies from Huddersfield. James "Jimmy" Ledgard left Dewsbury for a record fee of £2,650 in January 1948, bought by Leigh.

In 1972, Maurice Bamford arrived at Dewsbury as a coach. Tommy Smales was the coach in 1973. Dewsbury's only championship title came in the 1972–73 season when they beat Leeds in the play-off final at Bradford Northern's Odsal Stadium 22–13. They had been hammered 36–9 by the same opposition in the Yorkshire Cup final earlier that season. Dewsbury, captained by Mike Stephenson finished 8th in the league but the title was to be decided through a series of play-offs in which they also defeated Oldham, Featherstone Rovers and Warrington on their way to glory.

Many people argued about the validity of the centenary celebrations held in 1975, holding that the centenary should not have been held until 1998. On 13 September 1988, at about 4pm, three youths deliberately set fire to the historic wooden stand erected in 1914. The stand was in excellent condition, the club having just spent £25,000 bringing it up to the required safety standards. The club also lost everything gathered over the past 113 years; programmes, records and memorabilia. However, the fire enabled the club to build a new state of the art stadium at Owl Lane, Shaw Cross, Dewsbury and on 14 April 1991 Dewsbury played their last home game at Crown Flatt against Barrow. As a result, they arranged to play their home games at Batley's Mount Pleasant while the new ground was being built.

=== 1994–1995: New stadium ===
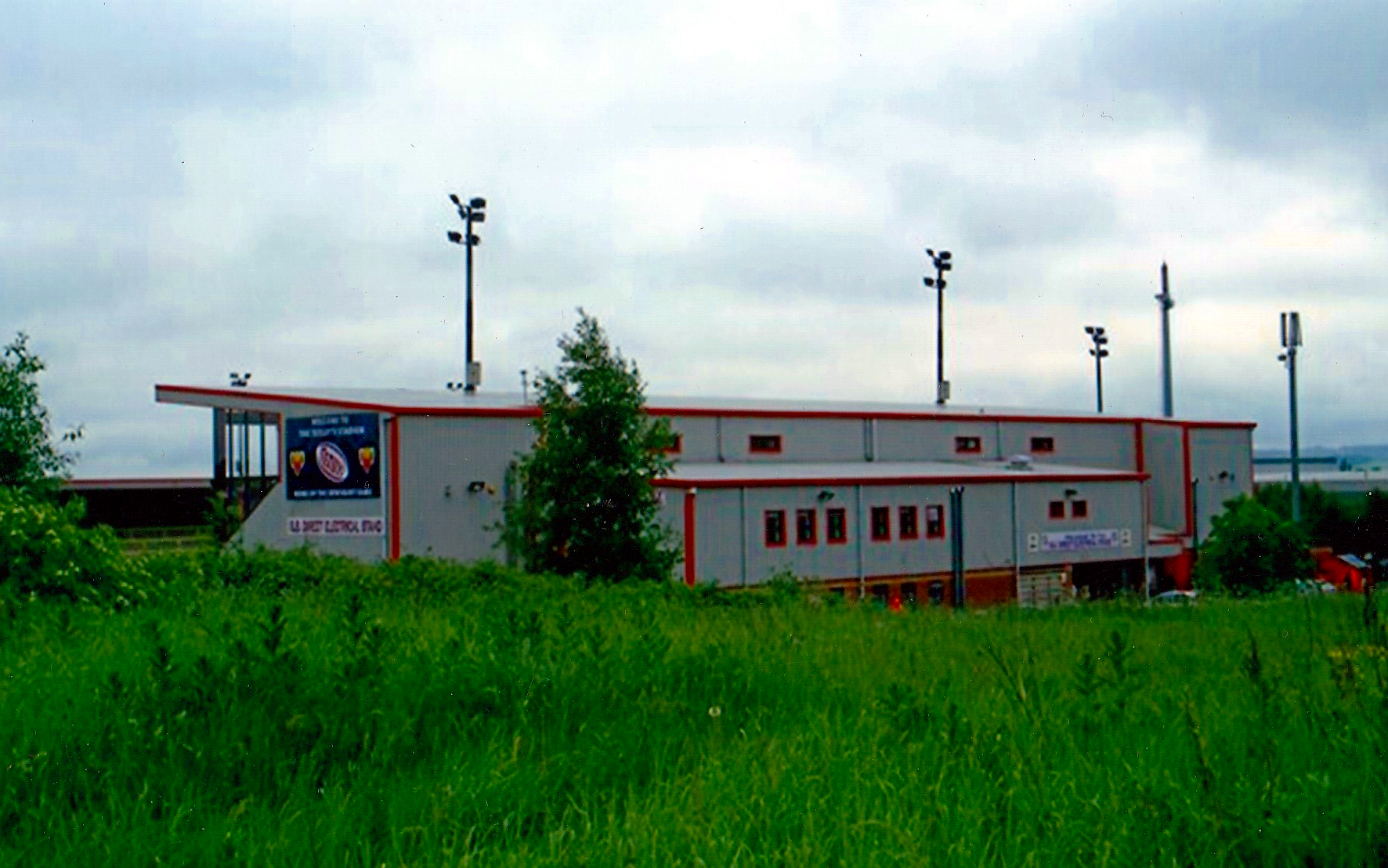
The new Crown Flatt stadium

The club played their first home game at the new, £1.5 million, Crown Flatt stadium (often erroneously called New Crown Flatt) on 6 September 1994 in front of a full-house against Barrow; Dewsbury scoring 12 tries. Dewsbury finished 7th that season in the 16-team second division with the likes of Eddie Rombo and Les Holliday wowing the fans at their new home under coach Norman Smith.

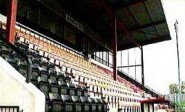
The new Crown Flatt stadium

Smith was replaced towards the end of that season by Tony Fisher whose time in charge of the first team will be remembered for the recruitment of several South African players. Having coached the national side during the 1995 world cup, Fisher brought Jaco Booysen, Kobus Van Deventer, Tim Fourie, Guy Coombe and Pierre Van Wyk to Dewsbury. The club lost the players from South Africa, when the club had a financial crisis due to unpaid taxes. The loss of Jaco Booysen had a huge impact.

That season, rugby league's centenary year, the teams outside the Premiership were divided into two divisions. Dewsbury competed in the first division but finished bottom – A New Year's Eve victory over local rivals Huddersfield and the form of New Zealand prop Glenn Bell being two of the season's few highlights.

=== 1996–1999: Summer era ===
A momentous shift in the sport, triggered by significant investment from Rupert Murdoch's News Corporation brought about the formation of the Super League and a switch to summer rugby. Despite finishing bottom the previous season, Dewsbury retained their place in the first division and, in the first season of a new era for the sport, the team, now coached by former player Neil Kelly, finished 9th.

It was under Kelly that the club would eventually blossom. Increased investment over the next three years saw the club steadily climb the league table season upon season. A 6th-place finish in 1997 was bettered the following year when the newly named Dewsbury 'Rams' finished 3rd, narrowly missing out on the division's play-off final.

With Richard Agar and Barry Eaton guiding the team around the park and Australians Brett Patterson and Brendan Williams giving the Rams real strike power, the club's on-the-pitch fortunes had hit a 15-year peak. Hopes were high of a push for a place in the Super League over the next few seasons, with Neil Kelly and chairman Bob McDermott pressing on with an ambitious recruitment drive.

In 1999, the Rams finished top of the Northern Ford Premiership, the league below the Super League, reaching the Grand Final at Headingley which unfortunately ended in a narrow defeat to local rivals Hunslet Hawks. The following year Dewsbury came back even stronger, winning the Trans-Pennine Cup with victory over Leigh and topping the league for the second season in a row. The club, once again, reached the Grand Final – this time taking on Leigh at Bury F.C.'s Gigg Lane stadium. A dramatic, late drop-goal from man of the match Richard Agar won the day for Dewsbury giving players, supporters and officials genuine hope of a place in Super League.

Unable to meet the minimum stadium requirements for Super League (as part of Rugby Football League's new 'framing the future' guidelines), the Rams proposed a ground share with Sheffield Eagles, playing home games at their Don Valley Stadium while their own stadium was improved. This proposal was turned down by the RFL and the club was left in a precarious position, having invested heavily in playing staff in the hope of taking their place among the sport's elite. The Rams withdrew their application following this initial rejection and were resigned to remaining in the lower leagues.

=== 2000–2004: Decline ===
The new century brought with it a gradual decline in the Rams' fortunes on and off the pitch. After being denied entry into Super League, the club's head coach, Neil Kelly, who had guided the team to its recent success moved onto ambitious rivals Widnes. Kelly took with him many of the heroes of the 2000 grand final winning squad and, over the two seasons that followed, his multiple-trophy winning side was gradually broken-up to help ease the club's soaring wage bills. The failure to bring Super League to the town came at a heavy price and chairman Bob McDermott left the club in a sorry state, having failed to stabilise it financially.

Roy Sampson and Andy Fisher both had spells coaching the club during this period but neither could do much to halt Dewsbury's inevitable decline. Dewsbury finished a respectable 6th in 2001 but found themselves in a relegation play-off the following season. Dewsbury beat Workington Town 25–16, thanks, in no small part, to a hat-trick from wily hooker Jimmy Elston, and, as a result, took their place in National League 1.

Despite fantastic performances from Danny Brough, Jimmy Elston, Frank Watene and the vastly experienced Richard Slater, Dewsbury were relegated the following year. Andy Fisher's position as player coach had become increasingly tenuous and it was felt a new start was needed to get the club heading in the right direction again.

The financial constraints the club was under by this point were so great that incumbent chairman Mark Sawyer had suggested that the side would be better suited to "take a year out" to find its feet financially. The club instead opted to field a side made up predominantly of local amateurs and, under new coach Andy Kelly, found the going tough in 2004, as their final lowly league position suggested. Plus points during an otherwise forgettable season were the return to the club of popular second rower Kevin Crouthers and the 15 tries of half back Adam Thaler.

=== 2005–2009: Resurgence ===
After a season in the wilderness, the club was now ready to stage a fightback. A head turning recruitment drive saw the Rams bring in several local ex-Super League stars in the shape of Francis Maloney, Ryan Sheridan, Darren Rogers and Warren Jowitt. The arrival of such big names galvanised the club and, with further recruitment from the local amateur scene, coach Kelly guided the Rams to a 2nd-place finish. The season ended with a narrow defeat in the divisional play-off final to local rivals Batley which would consign them to another season in National League 2. Despite the campaign ultimately ending in disappointment, Dewsbury had come a long way in just 12 months and hopes were high of going one better in 2007.

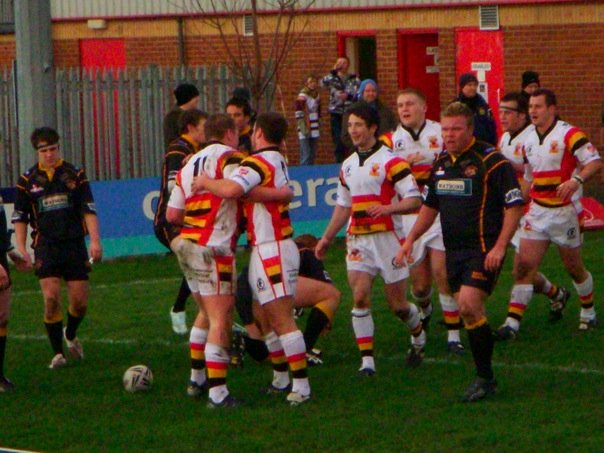
Rams players celebrate a try against local rivals Batley

These hopes became a reality the following season as Dewsbury clinched promotion to National League 1, completing a turnaround for the club. Under Andy Kelly's guidance, with contributions coming from the returning Frank Watene and veteran Francis Maloney, Dewsbury won 19 of their 22 matches to be crowned champions. The following year Dewsbury consolidated their position in the league above, finishing 7th with Dean Lawford and Josh Weeden the stand-out performers in Dewsbury colours.

2008 began with high hopes following the acquisition of highly rated Australian prop Aaron Trinder, Cook Islands international Tere Glassie and Super League full-back Mark Field. The season, however, was blighted with injuries to key players whilst several others did not perform to expectations. Coach Kelly left the club by mutual consent midway through the season with the Rams languishing at the foot of the table. Former fans favourite Warren Jowitt was brought in to try to turn the club's season around. Despite a brief revival, the Rams' fate was sealed with two games remaining and Dewsbury, once again, had to plan for life in the third tier of professional Rugby League in the newly named Championship 1.

An end of season clear out of the club's high earners by coach Jowitt greatly reduced the Rams' wage bill allowing him to bring in Rob Spicer from York City, Adam Hayes from Sheffield and several more young, lesser known players. The campaign that followed will long be remembered by Dewsbury supporters. The club winning all 18 league matches, becoming only the second team in rugby league history to do so. Following an outstanding 2009, the club were promoted and began preparing for life in the Championship. In the 2022 RFL Championship, Dewsbury were relegated after finishing second last on the table. Dewsbury managed to win only three games for the entire season. In 2023, Dewsbury earned promotion back to the Championship at the first attempt after finishing top of the division. In the 2024 RFL Championship season, Dewsbury had a miserable campaign which culminated in relegation back to League 1, winning only two games for the entire year.

== Stadium ==
Dewsbury play their home games at the FLAIR Stadium on Owl Lane in Dewsbury. The current name reflects a sponsorship deal with FLAIR Handling Systems Ltd - Air filter supplier in Birstall, England. This name has been in place since January 2023. Previously the ground was known as 'Tetley's stadium' or 'Ram Stadium' and, before that, 'New Crown Flatt'. The stadium was once the site of the Shawcross Colliery, which closed in 1968, and the road is still the starting point for the World Championship in Coal Carrying.

The stadium was opened in 1994 and consists of a covered all-seated North Stand opposite a covered all-standing South Stand. It has an official capacity of 3,000, in years past extra space was often utilised on the grass bankings behind both sets of posts in the summer. But as of the 2011 season the grass bankings have been closed to spectators for 'health and safety' reasons.

Planning applications were submitted during the latter half of 2012 for a new uncovered terracing area at the Eastern Owl Lane End of the stadium. The terrace was completed in time for Dewsbury's 2015 pre-season campaign.

== 2027 squad ==
2027 Dewsbury Rams squad
First team squad			Coaching staff
(Scotland) Danny Addy – LF, SO; (England) Jacob Bateman – SR, PR; (Australia) Bailey Black – SH, SO; (England) Zach Brown – SR; (England) Liam Copland – WG; (England) Tom Delaney – WG	(England) Brad Graham – WG, CE; (England) Sam Hallas – LF, HK; (England) Monty Lumb – HK; (England) Luke Nelms – PR; (England) Bailey O'Connor – CE, FB; (England) Jacob Parkinson – HK	(Australia) Pauli Pauli – PR, SR; (England) Harvey Roberts – PR; (England) George Senior (c) – CE; (England) Joe Summers – SR; (England) Finnley Thompson – LF, SR; (Jamaica) Declan Tomlinson – PR, LF, CE	Head coach: (England) Paul March; Assistant coach: (England) Matt Garside; Legend: (c) Captain(s); (vc) Vice-captain(s); Updated: Source(s): https://dewsburyrams.co.uk/squad/

== 2027 transfers ==
=== Gains ===
Player	From	Contract	Date
(England) Finnley Thompson	Bradford Bulls	1 year	23 July 2026
(England) Sam Hallas	Bradford Bulls	2 years	1 October 2026
(England) Monty Lumb	Huddersfield Giants	1 year	17 September 2026
(England) Zach Brown	Huddersfield Giants	1 year	6 October 2026
(Australia) Pauli Pauli	Doncaster RLFC	1 year	9 October 2026
(Australia) Bailey Black	Magpies RLFC	1 year	10 November 2026

=== Losses ===
Player	From	Contract	Date
(England) Louie Walker			1 September 2026
(England) Jacob Hookem			2 September 2026
(England) Jack Briggs	Batley Bulldogs	1 year	23 September 2026
(England) Dan Coates			1 November 2026

=== Retired ===
Player	Date
(England) Paul Sykes	28 August 2026

== Players ==
=== Players earning international caps while at Dewsbury ===
- Alan Bates (1972/73 Rugby Football League Championship Winner) won caps for Great Britain while at Dewsbury 1974
- Glenn Bell won a cap for Scotland while at Dewsbury Rams in 1997 against France
- Harry Beverley won caps for England while at Dewsbury 1975 Australia, while at Workington 1979 Wales
- Harry Bradshaw won caps for England while at Dewsbury 1953 Other Nationalities won caps for Great Britain while at Huddersfield (World Cup 1954 Squad 0-caps)
- Geoffrey "Geoff" Clark won caps for England while at Dewsbury 1949 Other Nationalities, 1951 Other Nationalities
- Leonard "Len" Constance won caps for Wales while at St. Helens, and Dewsbury 1948…1951 3-caps
- Barry Eaton won caps for Wales while at 1999…2001 1-cap + 4-caps (sub)
- Frank Gallagher won caps for England while at Batley 1923 Other Nationalities, 1924 Other Nationalities, 1925 Wales (2 matches), 1926 Wales, Other Nationalities, 1927 Wales, while at Leeds 1928 Wales, and won caps for Great Britain while at Dewsbury 1920 Australia (3 matches), 1921–22 Australia, while at Batley 1924 Australia (3 matches), New Zealand (3 matches), 1926–27 New Zealand (2 matches)
- Nathan Graham won caps for Scotland while at Bradford Bulls, Dewsbury, Featherstone Rovers, and Batley Bulldogs1998…2004 7-caps + 3-caps (sub)
- Jeff Grayshon (1972/73 Rugby Football League Championship Winner) won caps for England while at Dewsbury 1975 Wales, France, New Zealand, Australia, Australia, 1977 Wales, while at Bradford 1979 Wales, France, 1980 Wales (sub), France, 1981 Wales, and won caps for Great Britain while at Bradford 1979 Australia (2 matches), New Zealand (3 matches), 1980 New Zealand (2 matches), 1981 France (2 matches), 1982 Australia (2 matches), while at Leeds 1985 New Zealand (2 matches)
- Roy Lambert won caps for Wales while at Neath, Dewsbury, and Warrington 1950…1952 7-caps
- James "Jimmy" Ledgard won caps for England while at Dewsbury 1947 France (2 matches), Wales, while at Leigh 1948 Wales, 1949 France, Other Nationalities, 1951 Wales, France, 1952 Other Nationalities (2 matches), Wales, 1953 Wales, 1955 Other Nationalities, and won caps for Great Britain while at Dewsbury 1947 New Zealand (2 matches), while at Leigh 1948 Australia, 1950 Australia (2 matches), New Zealand, 1951 New Zealand, 1954 France (2 matches), Australia, New Zealand (World Cup 1954 4-caps, 1-try, 13-goals)
- Richard "Dicky" Evison Lockwood won caps for England (RU) while at Dewsbury 1889 New Zealand Natives 2 February 1889 The Spa in Gloucester
- Ryan McDonald won caps for Scotland while at Dewsbury Rams, and Halifax 2001…2005 1-cap + 1-cap (sub)
- Joseph "Joe" Mahoney won caps for Wales while at Oldham, and Dewsbury 1948…1950 5-caps
- Daniel "Danny" McKelvie won a cap for Scotland while at Dewsbury Rams in 1997 against France (sub)
- Thomas "Tommy" Milner won caps for England while at Dewsbury 1914 Wales
- Gilbert "Gil" Morgan won a cap for Wales while at Dewsbury 1938 1-cap
- Roy Pollard (Son of Wakefield Trinity's Charles "Charlie" Pollard) won caps for England while at Dewsbury 1949 France, 1950 Wales, and won caps for Great Britain while at Dewsbury 1950 New Zealand
- Bryn Powell won caps for Wales while at Salford, Featherstone Rovers, and Dewsbury 2004…2006 (5?)6-caps 4(3?)-tries 16(12?)-points
- William "Billy" Rhodes won caps for England while at Dewsbury 1921 Wales, Other Nationalities
- Harry Royal won caps for Wales while at Dewsbury 1948 2-caps
- William Stadden 1-cap for Wales (RU) while at Dewsbury 1890
- Mike 'Stevo' Stephenson (1972/73 Rugby Football League Championship Winner) won caps for Great Britain while at Dewsbury in 1971 against New Zealand, in 1972 against France, and in the 1972 Rugby League World Cup against Australia, France, New Zealand, and Australia (World Cup 1972 4-caps, 3-tries)
- Nigel Stephenson (1972/73 Rugby Football League Championship Winner) won caps for England while at Dewsbury 1975 Australia
- Harry Street won caps for England while at Dewsbury 1950 Wales (2 matches), France, while at Wigan 1951 France, 1952 Wales, 1953 France, and won caps for Great Britain while at Dewsbury 1950 Australia (3 matches), New Zealand

=== Other notable players ===
These players have either; won the Rugby Football League Championship, won the Challenge Cup, received a Testimonial match, were international representatives before, or after, their time at Dewsbury, or are notable outside of rugby league.

- Allan Agar (1972/73 Rugby Football League Championship Winner)
- Richard Agar
- Greg Ashcroft ex-Pontypridd RFC (1972/73 Rugby Football League Championship Winner)
- Kevin Ashcroft
- Dennis Bailey
- Damian Ball
- Maurice Bamford
- John Bates (Testimonial match 1976) (1972/73 Rugby Football League Championship Winner)
- Nathan Batty
- Luke Blake
- Harry Bowen (RU) 1884
- Danny Brough
- Archibald "Archie" Brown
- Percy Brown
- Austin Buchanan
- David "Dave" Busfield
- Chris Chapman
- Leonard Constance
- Bert Cook
- Ged Corcoran
- Kenneth "Ken" Crabtree
- Kevin Crouthers
- A. Dixon circa-1920
- Sid Domic
- Sean/Shaun/Shawn Dunford
- Alan Edwards
- Kane Epati
- Mark Field
- Liam Finn
- Andy Fisher
- Adrian Flynn
- Roy Francis
- Tere Glassie
- Nathan Graham
- Chris Green
- Tyssul Griffiths
- Harry Hammond prop 1940/50s
- Vic Hey
- Paul Hicks
- Les Holliday
- John "Jack" Holt
- Sylvain Houles
- David Morgan Jenkins
- Hampton Jones (Forward) to Wakefield Trinity circa-1883
- Warren Jowitt
- Brian Kelly (circa-1940s/50s)
- Neil Kelly
- Richard Kelly
- Joe Kirkham/Joseph Kirkham (to Featherstone Rovers in 1921)
- Chris Langley
- Dean Lawford
- Arnold "Arnie" Long
- Davide Longo
- Ryan MacDonald
- Dominic Maloney
- Tony Marchant
- David Mycoe
- Alwyn Newall scrum-half Captain 1960s
- Alfred Newsome (brother of Mark) circa-1883
- Mark Newsome (brother of Alfred) circa-1883
- Adrian Plummer
- Evan Rees
- Donald "Don" Richardson fullback, scrum-half 256-matches 1976…86 (Testimonial match 1986)
- Gus Risman
- Darren Rogers
- E. Rogers circa-1920
- Ron Rylance
- Derrick Schofield
- Charlie Seeling, Jr Captain circa-1930s son of Charlie Seeling
- Andy Speak
- Tim Spears
- Rob Spicer
- Christopher "Chris" Squires (Testimonial match 1991)
- William Stadden
- William Stocks
- Angus Stuart
- Mick Sullivan circa-1966
- Paul Sykes
- Brian Taylor circa-1965
- Lance Todd circa-1914
- Aaron Trinder
- Chris Vasey stand-off (1983…1988/89 to Leeds)
- Frank Watene
- Steven Watkins
- Johnny Wolford
- Edward Rombo

Brady of Dewsbury played in The Rest's 5–7 defeat to Leeds in the 1901–02 Yorkshire Senior Competition Champions versus The Rest match at Headingley Stadium on Saturday 19 April 1902.

== Past coaches ==
Also see Category:Dewsbury Rams coaches.

- Joe Lyman c. 1934
- Eddie Waring 1943-44
- Vic Hey 1944-47
- Leonard Constance 1951
- Bert Cook 1958
- Dave Cox 1971-72
- Tommy Smales 1973
- Dave Cox 1975-76
- Les Pearce
- Bernard Watson 1980–82
- Ray Abbey 1982–83
- Tommy Smales 1983-84
- Jack Addy 1984–86
- David Busfield 1987
- Terry Crook 1988–89
- Maurice Bamford 1990
- Jack Addy 1991
- Jack Addy 1993
- Norman Smith 1994–95
- Tony Fisher 1995–96
- Neil Kelly 1996–00
- Roy Sampson 2000–02
- Andy Fisher 2002–03
- Andy Kelly 2003–08
- Warren Jowitt 2008–12
- Glenn Morrison 2012–17
- Neil Kelly 2017–18
- Lee Greenwood 2019–22
- Paul Sykes (interim) 2022
- Liam Finn 2022-23
- Dale Ferguson 2024
- Paul March 2024-

== Team mascot ==
The club's match day and community mascot is Roger Ram. Standing at almost over seven feet tall, dressed in the red, amber and black colours of the team. He can be seen regularly entertaining the crowds, at home games played at the Tetley Stadium. He also attends many of the community events, which take place within the Dewsbury area. Occasionally depending upon the season, he can also be seen with decorated horns including flashing lights. Roger took part in the 2012 Sue Ryder gold cup mascot race at Wetherby race course on 31 May, crossing the line in 15th place. At the same event he was awarded the 1st-place trophy for best mascot in parade and a £50 cheque which he donated to Sue Ryder cancer care. Roger intends to better his placing in 2013 when he will return to compete again for the mascot gold cup.

== Seasons ==
=== Super League era ===
Season	League									Play-offs	Challenge Cup	Other competitions		Name	Tries	Name	Points
Season	Division	P	W	D	L	F	A	Pts	Pos	Play-offs	Challenge Cup	Other competitions		Top try scorer		Top point scorer	
1996	Division Two	20	6	1	13	264	618	13	8th		R5						
1997	Division One	20	9	0	11	341	455	18	6th		R5						
1998	Division One	30	19	2	9	723	481	40	3rd	Lost in Semi Final	R5						
1999	Northern Ford Premiership	28	21	2	5	710	449	44	1st	Lost in Final	R4						
2000	Northern Ford Premiership	28	22	1	5	848	400	45	1st	Won in Final	QF	Trans-Pennine Cup	W				
2001	Northern Ford Premiership	28	18	0	10	801	438	36	6th	Lost in Elimination Playoffs	R3						
2002	Northern Ford Premiership	27	14	1	12	723	616	29	10th		R3						
2003	National League One	18	2	1	15	284	751	5	10th		R4						
2004	National League Two	18	3	1	14	284	595	7	9th		R3						
2005	National League Two	18	13	1	4	526	350	27	2nd	Lost in Final	R3						
2006	National League Two	22	19	0	3	693	354	38	1st		R4						
2007	National League One	18	5	0	13	346	572	19	7th		R4						
2008	National League One	18	2	0	16	315	612	13	10th		R5						
2009	Championship 1	18	18	0	0	760	233	54	1st		R4						
2010	Championship	20	6	0	14	454	503	26	9th		R4						
2011	Championship	20	4	1	15	413	618	18	9th		R4						
2012	Championship	18	7	0	11	371	518	25	7th		R4						
2013	Championship	26	12	0	14	492	620	42	7th	Lost in Elimination Playoffs	R4						
2014	Championship	26	15	0	11	669	585	51	6th		R4						
2015	Championship	23	12	1	10	490	461	25	6th	Lost in Shield Semi Final	R6						
2015	Championship Shield	30	17	1	12	686	624	35	2nd	Lost in Shield Semi Final	R6						
2016	Championship	23	8	0	15	486	603	16	8th	Lost in Shield Semi Final	R6						
2016	Championship Shield	30	12	0	18	646	797	24	4th	Lost in Shield Semi Final	R6						
2017	Championship	23	8	0	15	388	736	16	8th	Lost in Shield Semi Final	R6						
2017	Championship Shield	30	12	0	18	584	917	24	4th	Lost in Shield Semi Final	R6						
2018	Championship	23	6	1	16	424	746	13	9th		R4						
2018	Championship Shield	30	10	1	19	650	899	21	4th		R4						
2019	Championship	27	6	2	19	513	721	14	12th		R6	1895 Cup	QF				
2020	Championship (Note: The 2020 Championship was abandoned due to the COVID-19 pandemic in the United Kingdom. Statistics shown are those at time of abandonment and are not official.)	3	2	0	1	72	66	6	6th		R5						
2021	Championship	21	8	1	12	360	608	17	10th		R3 (Note: Officially round 1 due to the competitions temporary restructure in 2021.)	1895 Cup	R1				
2022	Championship	27	3	1	23	385	964	7	13th		R4						
2023	League 1	18	15	1	2	623	215	31	1st	None (Note: Teams do not enter League 1 playoffs if league leaders)	R5						
2024	Championship	26	2	0	24	344	919	4	14th		R3	1895 Cup	GS				
2025	League One	18	10	1	7	464	342	21	4th (Note: Promotion due to the merging League One and the Championship)	Play-offs cancelled	R3	1895 Cup	R1				
2026	Championship	24	8	0	16	522	652	16	11th		R3	1895 Cup	R1				

== Honours ==
Championships
Competition	Wins	Years won
RFL Championship / Super League	1	1972–73
Challenge Cup	2	1911–12, 1942–43

Other titles
Competition	Wins	Years won
RFL Yorkshire League	1	1946–47
RFL Yorkshire Cup	3	1925–26, 1927–28, 1942–43
RFU Yorkshire Cup	1	1881
Northern Ford Premiership Play-Offs	1	2000
Northern Ford Premiership League	2	1999, 2000
Trans-Pennine Cup	1	2000
National League Two /League 1	1	2006, 2009, 2023

== Records ==
=== Team records ===
- Biggest victory: 90–5 vs Blackpool Gladiators on 4 April 1993
- Biggest defeat: 82–0 vs Widnes on, 30 November 1986
- Highest attendance:
  - Crown Flatt: 26,584 vs Halifax in the Yorkshire Cup on 30 October 1920
  - Tetley's Stadium: 4,068 vs. Bradford Bulls on 6 April 2015

=== Individual records ===
- Season
  - Goals: 170 by Barry Eaton in 2000
  - Tries: 40 by Dai Thomas in 1906/07
  - Points: 398 by Barry Eaton in 2000
- Match
  - Goals: 13
    - Greg Pearce vs Blackpool Gladiators on 4 April 1993.
    - Francis Maloney vs Hunslet Hawks on 25 March 2007
  - Tries: 8 by Dai Thomas vs Liverpool on 13 April 1907
  - Points: 32 by Les Holliday v Barrow on 11 September 1994
- Career
  - Appearances: 454 by Joe Lyman (1913 to 1931)
  - Goals: 863 by Nigel Stephenson (1967–78 and 1984–86)
  - Tries: 144 by Joe Lyman (1913 to 1931)

== See also ==
- Heavy Woollen Derby: rivalry with Batley Bulldogs
