= Doug Greenall =

English RL coach and former GB & England international rugby league footballer

Personal information
- Full name: Douglas Greenall
- Born: 7 June 1927 St Helens, Lancashire, England
- Died: 23 December 2008 (aged 81) St Helens, Merseyside, England

Playing information
- Weight: 11 st 8 lb (73 kg)
- Position: Centre
Club
Years	Team	Pld	T	G	FG	P
1946–59	St Helens	487	188	14	0	592
1959–60	Wigan	3	0	0	0	0
1960–61	Bradford Northern	4	0	0	0	0
	Total	494	188	14	0	592
Representative
Years	Team	Pld	T	G	FG	P
1952–54	Lancashire	3	1	0	0	3
1958	English League XIII	1
1951–53	England	6	5	0	0	15
1951–54	Great Britain	6	3	0	0	9

Coaching information
Club
Years	Team	Gms	W	D	L	W%
1961	Bradford Northern
	Liverpool City
	Total	0	0	0	0

Douglas Greenall (7 June 1927 – 23 December 2008) was an English professional rugby league footballer who played in the 1940s, 1950s and 1960s, and coached in the 1960s. He played at representative level for Great Britain, England, English League XIII and Lancashire, and at club level for St Helens, Wigan and Bradford Northern, as a centre, and coached at club level for Bradford Northern and Liverpool City.

== Early life ==
Greenall was born in 1927 in St Helens, Lancashire, England, and was educated at Rivington Road School. During the Second World War, he joined the Air Training Corps.

== Playing career ==
=== Club career ===
Greenall signed for St Helens in February 1946 for a fee of £30, and made his first team debut two months later against Salford. During his early years at the club, he usually played at stand-off or on the wing.

Greenall played at centre and was captain in St Helens' 10–15 defeat by Huddersfield in the 1952–53 Challenge Cup final during the 1952–53 season at Wembley Stadium, London on Saturday 25 April 1953, in front of a crowd of 89,588, and played at centre in the 13–2 victory over Halifax in the 1955–56 Challenge Cup final during the 1955–56 season at Wembley Stadium, London on Saturday 28 April 1956, in front of a crowd of 79,341.

Greenall played at centre in St. Helens' 5–22 defeat by Leigh in the 1952–53 Lancashire Cup final during the 1952–53 season at Station Road, Swinton on Saturday 29 November 1952, played at centre in the 16-8 victory over Wigan in the 1953–54 Lancashire Cup final during the 1953–54 season at Station Road, Swinton on Saturday 24 October 1953, played at centre in the 3–10 defeat by Oldham in the 1956–57 Lancashire Cup final during the 1956–57 season at Central Park, Wigan on Saturday 20 October 1956, played at centre in the 2-12 defeat by Oldham in the 1958–59 Lancashire Cup Final during the 1958–59 season at Station Road, Swinton Saturday 25 October 1958, and played at centre in the 4–5 defeat by Warrington in the 1959–60 Lancashire Cup Final during the 1959–60 season at Central Park, Wigan Saturday 31 October 1959.

Greenall's testimonial match at St. Helens took place against Halifax in 1952.

=== International honours ===
Greenall won caps for England while at St. Helens in 1951 against France, in 1952 against Other Nationalities, Wales, in 1953 against France (2 matches), and Other Nationalities

Greenall won his first Great Britain caps in 1951 against New Zealand, playing in all three Tests against the touring Kiwis. In 1952, he played in two Tests against Australia, scoring two tries in the Second Test, which Great Britain won 21–5. Greenall was later accused by Australia manager Norm Robinson of wearing a cast on his forearm, which he had allegedly used during the game on opposing centre Noel Hazzard to knock him unconscious. Greenall denied the allegations, but received a hostile reception from the Australian press when he was selected for the 1954 Lions tour. Although he missed out on all three Tests against Australia, he regained his place for one of the Tests on the New Zealand leg of the tour.

Greenall also represented Great Britain in two matches against France; the 12–22 defeat at Parc des Princes, Paris on 22 May 1952, and the 17–22 defeat by France at Stade de Gerland, Lyon on 24 May 1953.

Greenall played at centre for English League XIII while at St Helens in the 8-26 defeat by France on Saturday 22 November 1958 at Knowsley Road, St. Helens.

== Honoured at St Helens R.F.C. ==
Doug Greenall is a St Helens R.F.C. Hall of Fame inductee.

== Personal life ==
Greenall married Vera Campbell in 1948, with whom he had one son, and was the landlord of a number of different pubs in the St Helens area throughout his life. He died in 2007, aged 80 in St. Helens, Merseyside, England.

== Sources ==
- Whittle, Denis (2006). Duggie Greenall : A Rugby League Saint. London: London League. ISBN 978-1-903659-27-4.
