= Dai Thomas (rugby league) =

Welsh rugby league footballer

Personal information
- Full name: David Thomas
- Born: 15 February 1879 Morriston, Swansea, Wales
- Died: 1958 (aged 78–79)

Playing information
- Position: Forward
Club
Years	Team	Pld	T	G	FG	P
1901–05	Oldham	61	1			3
Representative
Years	Team	Pld	T	G	FG	P
1904	Other Nationalities	1	1			3

David "Dai" Thomas (15 February 1879 – 1958) was a Welsh professional rugby league footballer who played in the 1900s. He played at representative level for Other Nationalities, and at club level for Oldham, as a forward.

== Playing career ==
=== International honours ===
David "Dai" Thomas won a cap, and scored his team's first try, playing as a forward for Other Nationalities in the 9–3 victory over England at Central Park, Wigan on Tuesday 5 April 1904, in the first ever international rugby league match.

=== Championship appearances ===
Dai Thomas played in Oldham's victory in the Championship during the 1904–05 season.
