= Jim Stott =

GB & England international rugby league footballer

Personal information
- Full name: James Stott
- Born: 15 November 1919 Prescot, England
- Died: 6 July 1994 (aged 74)

Playing information
- Position: Centre
Club
Years	Team	Pld	T	G	FG	P
1939–52	St. Helens	193	65	295	0	785
1942	→ Wigan (guest)	2	3	0		9
	Total	195	68	295	0	794
Representative
Years	Team	Pld	T	G	FG	P
≥1939–≤52	Lancashire	2
1943–47	England	3	0	0	0	0
1947	Great Britain	1	0	0	0	0

James Stott (15 November 1919 – 6 July 1994) was an English professional rugby league footballer who played in the 1930s, 1940s and 1950s. He played at representative level for Great Britain, England and Lancashire, and at club level for United Glass Bottle ARLFC (now Eccleston Lions ARLFC (in Eccleston, St Helens) of the North West Men's League), and St Helens, as a centre. Jim Stott was a Private in the British Army during World War II, and appeared for Wigan as a World War II guest player.

== Background ==
Stott was born in Prescot, Lancashire, England, he was a pupil at Merton Bank School, St. Helens, and he died aged 74.

== Playing career ==
=== Notable matches ===
Stott played in United Glass Bottle's 5–48 defeat by Hunslet in the 1938–39 Challenge Cup first-round match at Parkside, Hunslet on Saturday 4 February 1939, he was a reserve for Northern Command XIII against a Rugby League XIII at Thrum Hall, Halifax on Saturday 21 March 1942.

=== International honours ===
Stott won caps for England while at St. Helens, in a 1943 match against Wales and in 1946 and 1947 matches against France, and won caps for Great Britain while at St. Helens, in a 1947 match against New Zealand.

== Honoured at St Helens R.F.C. ==
Stott is a St Helens R.F.C. Hall of Fame inductee.
