= Ray Cale =

Welsh rugby union and rugby league footballer

- Born: William Raymond Cale; 18 July 1922 Usk, Wales
- Died: 23 May 2006 (aged 83)

Rugby union career
- Position: Flanker
Amateur team(s)
| Years | Team | Apps | (Points) |
- Ebbw Vale RFC
- Newbridge RFC
| 1949-50 | Pontypool RFC | | |
International career
| Years | Team | Apps | (Points) |
| 1949-50 | Wales | 7 | (3) |
- Rugby league career

Playing information
- Position: Second-row, Loose forward
Club
| Years | Team | Pld | T | G | FG | P |
|---|---|---|---|---|---|---|
| 1950–54 | St. Helens | 122 | | | | 75 |
Representative
| Years | Team | Pld | T | G | FG | P |
| 1951 | Wales | 4 | | | | 0 |

William Raymond "Ray" Cale (18 July 1922 – 23 May 2006) was a Welsh dual-code international rugby union, and professional rugby league footballer who played in the 1940s and 1950s. He played representative level rugby union (RU) for Wales, and at club level for Ebbw Vale RFC, Newbridge RFC and Pontypool RFC, as a flanker, and representative level rugby league (RL) for Wales, and at club level for St. Helens, as a second-row, or loose forward.

== Background ==
Ray Cale's birth was registered in Pontypool, Wales, he was a native of Usk in Monmouthshire, and he died aged 83.

== Rugby union ==
Ray Cale made his name as a rampaging, tough tackling flanker. He learnt rugby union at Ebbw Vale and Newbridge. In 1947, he played for a combined Pontypool, Blaenavon and Talywain side against the Australian national rugby union team.

Cale made his Welsh début against England at Cardiff Arms Park in 1949 as a backrower. He played three Five Nations matches in the 1949 season. Wales came last in the championship.

In 1950, he switched to Pontypool RFC. Cale played in all four Five Nations matches the following season when Wales won a grand slam defeating England, Scotland, Ireland and France. He was known for his strong tackling and robust play. He scored a try against England at Twickenham, and forced an error that led to Malcolm Thomas scoring a match winning try against Ireland.

He was a controversial omission from the British and Irish Lions team that toured Australia and New Zealand later that season. He was deemed to be "too rough" a player for the tour.

== Rugby league ==
He joined St. Helens the following season. His strong defensive game and robust running style allowed him to adapt easily to rugby league. In 1951, he played against the touring New Zealand national rugby league team for St Helens. He was a losing finalist in the 1952 Lancashire Cup match against Leigh but was an integral member of championship winning side in the 1952/53 season. In 1953, he played for St Helens in the Rugby League Challenge Cup losing to the Huddersfield Giants 15-10 at Wembley Stadium

He played 122 games for St. Helens. He also became a double international by adding four Welsh league caps to the seven he won at union, figuring twice against Other Nationalities, France and England. His career in rugby league ended in 1953-54.

=== Challenge Cup Final appearances ===
Ray Cale played loose forward in St. Helens' 10-15 defeat by Huddersfield in the 1953 Challenge Cup Final during the 1952-53 season at Wembley Stadium, London on Saturday 25 April 1953.

=== County Cup Final appearances ===
Ray Cale played loose forward in St. Helens' 5-22 defeat by Leigh in the 1952 Lancashire Cup Final during the 1952–53 season at Station Road, Swinton on Saturday 29 November 1952.
