= Steve Llewellyn =

Wales international rugby league footballer

Personal information
- Full name: Stewart Marshall Llewellyn
- Born: 24 January 1924; Abertillery, Blaenau Gwent, Wales
- Died: 10 December 2002 (aged 78); St Helens, Merseyside, England

Playing information

Rugby union
Club
Years	Team	Pld	T	G	FG	P
1945–48	Abertillery

Rugby league
- Position: Wing
Club
Years	Team	Pld	T	G	FG	P
1948–58	St. Helens	287	239	0	0	717
Representative
Years	Team	Pld	T	G	FG	P
1948–53	Wales	4	0	0	0	0

Stewart Marshall "Steve" Llewellyn (29 February 1924 – 10 December 2002) was a Welsh rugby union and professional rugby league footballer who played in the 1940s and 1950s. He played club level rugby union (RU) for Abertillery RFC, and representative level rugby league (RL) for Wales, and at club level for St. Helens, as a wing, with whom he won two Challenge Cup titles and a Championship, later being inducted into the clubs Hall of Fame.

Llewellyn was born in Abertyleri, Blaenau Gwent on 29 February 1924. He joined the Welsh Guards in 1943 and served in Italy during the Second World War. Having been playing rugby union for his hometown of Abertillery since 1945, Llewellyn signed with English rugby league club St Helens in January 1948.

During the 1952–53 Northern Rugby Football League season Llewellyn played on the wing in St. Helens' 5–22 defeat by Leigh in the 1952 Lancashire Cup Final at Station Road, Swinton on Saturday 29 November 1952. During the 1952–53 Northern Rugby Football League season Llewellyn played on the wing and scored a try in St. Helens' 10–15 defeat by Huddersfield in the 1953 Challenge Cup Final at Wembley Stadium, London on Saturday 25 April 1953. During the 1953–54 Northern Rugby Football League season, he played on the wing in the 16–8 victory over Wigan in the 1953 Lancashire Cup Final at Station Road, Swinton on Saturday 24 October 1953. LLewellyn equalled the St. Helens' club record for most tries in a match twice by scoring six against Castleford on 3 March 1956, and again against Liverpool City on 20 August 1956. During the 1956–57 Northern Rugby Football League season, he and played on the wing in the 3–10 defeat by Oldham in the 1956 Lancashire Cup Final at Central Park, Wigan on Saturday 20 October 1956.

Llewellyn was one of less than twenty Welshmen to have scored more than 200-tries in their rugby league career. Only three players (Tom van Vollenhoven, Les Jones and Alf Ellaby) have scored more than his 240 tries for the St Helens club. In retirement, he stayed in St. Helen's, working as an English language and PE teacher, and later became deputy head at two local secondary schools. Llewellyn died in St Helens, Merseyside, in 2002.
