= Peter Metcalfe =

England rugby league footballer (1931–2016)

Personal information
- Full name: Peter Metcalfe
- Born: 5 November 1931 Prescot, England
- Died: 13 February 2016 (aged 84) Scarborough, England

Playing information
- Position: Fullback, Centre, Stand-off
Club
Years	Team	Pld	T	G	FG	P
1952–55	St. Helens	71	29	234	0	555
Representative
Years	Team	Pld	T	G	FG	P
1954	Rugby League XIII	1
1953	England	1	0	0	0	0
195?	Lancashire		0	0	0	0

Peter Metcalfe (5 November 1931 – 13 February 2016) was an English professional rugby league footballer who played in the 1950s, and coached. He played at representative level for England and Rugby League XIII, and at club level for Pilkington Recs and St. Helens, as a goal-kicking fullback, centre, or stand-off, and coached at club level for Pilkington Recs.

== Background ==
Peter Metcalfe's birth was registered in Prescot district, Lancashire, England, and he died aged 84 in Scarborough, North Yorkshire, England.

== Playing career ==
=== Club career ===
Metcalfe played stand-off, and scored five goals in St. Helens' 16-8 victory over Wigan in the 1953 Lancashire Cup Final during the 1953–54 season at Station Road, Swinton on Saturday 24 October 1953.

He sustained a broken knee cap during St. Helens' 26-18 victory over York at Knowsley Road, St. Helens, on Saturday 3 September 1955, this injury ended his rugby league career.

=== International honours ===
Metcalfe won a cap for England while at St. Helens in 1953 against France, and represented Rugby League XIII while at St. Helens in 1954 against Australasia.
