= Don Gullick =

Welsh RL coach and former Wales international rugby league footballer

Personal information
- Full name: Donald Gullick
- Born: 22 November 1924 Pontypool, Wales
- Died: 14 April 2000 (aged 75) Wales

Playing information

Rugby union
Club
Years	Team	Pld	T	G	FG	P
≤1950–50	Pontypool RFC

Rugby league
- Position: Wing, Centre, Stand-off, Loose forward
Club
Years	Team	Pld	T	G	FG	P
1950–55	St. Helens	140	42			126
1955–58	Leigh	45
	Total	185	42	0	0	126
Representative
Years	Team	Pld	T	G	FG	P
1950–53	Wales	9

Coaching information
Club
Years	Team	Gms	W	D	L	W%
1958–60	Leigh

Donald Gullick (22 November 1924 – 14 April 2000) was a Welsh rugby union, and professional rugby league footballer who played in the 1950s, and coached rugby league in the 1950s and 1960s. He played club level rugby union (RU) for Pontypool RFC, and representative level rugby league (RL) for Wales, and at club level for St Helens and Leigh, as a wing, centre, stand-off, or loose forward, and coached club level rugby league for Leigh.

== Personal life ==
Gullick was born in Pontypool district, Wales. Following his move to play rugby in the north of England, he worked as a woodwork teacher at Ashton Grammar School, Ashton-in-Makerfield, and as a games master at Rivington Road School in St. Helens, and he died aged 75.

== Playing career ==
=== Club career ===
Gullick played at centre in St Helens' 24–14 victory over Halifax in the Championship Final during the 1952–53 season at Maine Road, Manchester on Saturday 9 May 1953.

Gullick played at centre in St Helens' 10–15 defeat by Huddersfield in the 1952–53 Challenge Cup Final at Wembley Stadium, London on Saturday 25 April 1953.

Gullick played at centre, and scored a try in St. Helens' 5–22 defeat by Leigh in the 1952 Lancashire Cup Final during the 1952–53 season at Station Road, Swinton on Saturday 29 November 1952, and played at centre in St Helens' 16–8 victory over Wigan in the 1953 Lancashire Cup Final during the 1953–54 season at Station Road, Swinton on Saturday 24 October 1953.

=== International honours ===
Gullick won nine caps for Wales (RL) in 1950–53.
