= Stan McCormick =

English rugby league coach (1923–1999)

Personal information
- Full name: Stanley McCormick
- Born: 5 July 1923 Oldham, England
- Died: July 1999 (aged 75–76)

Playing information
- Position: Wing
Club
| Years | Team | Pld | T | G | FG | P |
|---|---|---|---|---|---|---|
| 1940–49 | Broughton / Belle Vue Rangers | 142 | 69 | 0 | 0 | 207 |
| 1939–40 | → Oldham RLFC (guest) | 1 | 0 | 0 | 0 | 0 |
| 1941–42 | → Oldham RLFC (guest) | 1 | 0 | 0 | 0 | 0 |
| ≤1944–≥45 | → Huddersfield (guest) |
| 1949–54 | St. Helens | 161 | 99 | 2 | 0 | 301 |
| 1954–56 | Warrington | 48 | 17 | 0 | 0 | 51 |
| 1956 | Liverpool City | 3 | 0 | 2 | 0 | 4 |
| | Total | 356 | 185 | 4 | 0 | 563 |
Representative
| Years | Team | Pld | T | G | FG | P |
| 1947–53 | Lancashire | 11 | 7 | 0 | 0 | 21 |
| 1948 | England | 3 | 0 | 0 | 0 | 0 |
| 1948–49 | Great Britain | 3 | 3 | 0 | 0 | 9 |

Coaching information
Club
| Years | Team | Gms | W | D | L | W% |
| 1962–64 | St. Helens |
| 1978 | Salford |
| | Total | 0 | 0 | 0 | 0 |

Stanley McCormick (5 July 1923 – July 1999) was an English professional rugby league footballer who played in the 1940s and 1950s, and coached in the 1960s and 1970s. He played at representative level for Great Britain, England and Lancashire, and at club level for Broughton Rangers/Belle Vue Rangers, Oldham RLFC (World War II guest), Huddersfield (World War II guest), St Helens and Warrington, with whom he won the 1953–54 Challenge Cup, as a wing. and coached at club level for St. Helens and Salford. McCormick is a St Helens R.F.C. Hall of Fame inductee.

== Background ==
Stan McCormick was born in Oldham, Lancashire, England, and he died aged 75–76.

== Playing career ==
=== Championship final appearances ===
McCormick played in Warrington's 8-7 victory over Halifax the Championship Final during the 1953–54 season at Maine Road, Manchester on Saturday 8 May 1954, in front of a crowd of 36,519.

=== County League appearances ===
McCormick played in St. Helens' victory in the Lancashire League during the 1952–53 season, and played in Warrington's victories in the Lancashire League during the 1953–54 season and 1954–55 season.

=== Challenge Cup Final appearances ===
McCormick played on the wing in St. Helens' 10–15 defeat by Huddersfield in the 1953 Challenge Cup Final during the 1952–53 season at Wembley Stadium, London on Saturday 25 April 1953, played wing in Warrington's 4–4 draw with Halifax in the 1954 Challenge Cup Final during the 1953–54 season at Wembley Stadium, London on Saturday 24 April 1954, in front of a crowd of 81,841, and played on the wing in the 8-4 victory over Halifax in the 1954 Challenge Cup Final replay during the 1953–54 season at Odsal Stadium, Bradford on Wednesday 5 May 1954, in front of a record crowd of 102,575 or more.

=== County Cup Final appearances ===
McCormick played at centre in Belle Vue Rangers' 7-10 defeat by Wigan in the 1947 Lancashire Cup Final during the 1947–48 season at Station Road, Swinton on Saturday 1 November 1947, played on the wing in St. Helens' 5-22 defeat by Leigh in the 1952 Lancashire Cup Final during the 1952–53 season at Station Road, Swinton on Saturday 29 November 1952, and played on the wing in the 16-8 victory over Wigan in the 1953 Lancashire Cup Final during the 1953–54 season at Station Road, Swinton on Saturday 24 October 1953.

=== Club career ===
In January 1949, McCormick joined St. Helens from Belle Vue Rangers for a record fee of £4,000 (based on increases in average earnings, this would be approximately £329,600 in 2014), he later went on to play for Warrington.

=== International honours ===
McCormick won caps for England while at Belle Vue Rangers in 1948 against Wales, and France, while at St Helens in 1949 against Wales, and France, in 1951 against Wales, in 1953 against France (2 matches), and Wales, and won caps for Great Britain while at Belle Vue Rangers in 1948 against Australia (2 matches); and while at St. Helens in 1949 against Australia.

McCormick also represented Great Britain while at St. Helens between 1952 and 1956 against France (1 non-Test matches).
