= 1956–57 Lancashire Cup =

- Structure: Regional knockout championship
- Teams: 15
- Winners: Oldham
- Runners-up: St. Helens

1956–57 was the forty-fourth occasion on which the Lancashire Cup completion had been held.
Oldham won the trophy by beating St. Helens by the score of 10-3
The match was played at Central Park, Wigan, (historically in the county of Lancashire). The excellent attendance was 39,544 and receipts were £6,274
This was the first of Oldham's three consecutive triumphs. 1958 would be the last time they would win the trophy, although they did later appear 4 times as runners-up (in 1966, 1969, 1987 and 1989

== Background ==
With the invitation to junior club “County Amateurs”, the number of clubs remained the same at 15.
The same pre-war fixture format was retained, and due to the number of clubs this resulted in one bye in the first round.

== Competition and results ==
=== Round 1 ===
Involved 7 matches (with one bye but no “blank” fixture) and 15 clubs

Game No	Fixture date	Home team	Score	Away team	Venue	Att	Rec	Notes	Ref
1	Sat 01 Sep 1956	Blackpool Borough	15-12	Whitehaven	St Anne's Road Greyhound Stadium				
2	Sat 01 Sep 1956	Liverpool City	24-7	County Amateurs	Mill Yard, Knotty Ash			1	
3	Sat 01 Sep 1956	St. Helens	27-7	Swinton	Knowsley Road	17,000			
4	Sat 01 Sep 1956	Salford	17-9	Workington Town	The Willows				
5	Sat 01 Sep 1956	Warrington	31-8	Rochdale Hornets	Wilderspool				
6	Sat 01 Sep 1956	Widnes	7-17	Barrow	Naughton Park				
7	Sat 01 Sep 1956	Wigan	16-18	Oldham	Central Park				
8		Leigh		bye					

=== Round 2 - quarterfinals ===
Involved 3 matches (with no bye) and 8 clubs

Game No	Fixture date	Home team	Score	Away team	Venue	Att	Rec	Notes	Ref
1	Tue 11 Sep 1956	St. Helens	34-3	Liverpool City	Knowsley Road	9,000			
2	Tue 11 Sep 1956	Salford	0-31	Oldham	The Willows				
3	Wed 12 Sep 1956	Leigh	25-3	Blackpool Borough	Kirkhall Lane				
4	Thu 13 Sep 1956	Warrington	5-2	Barrow	Wilderspool				

=== Round 3 – semifinals ===
Involved 2 matches and 4 clubs

Game No	Fixture date	Home team	Score	Away team	Venue	Att	Rec	Notes	Ref
1	Wed 19 Sep 1956	Leigh	9-18	Oldham	Kirkhall Lane				
2	Thu 20 Sep 1956	Warrington	9-17	St. Helens	Wilderspool	26,000			

=== Final ===
Game No	Fixture date	Home team	Score	Away team	Venue	Att	Rec	Notes	Ref
	Saturday 20 October 1956	Oldham	10-3	St. Helens	Central Park	39,544	£6,274	2	

==== Teams and scorers ====
Oldham	No.	St. Helens
	teams	
Bernard Ganley	1	Glyn Moses
Richard Cracknell	2	Steve Llewellyn
Dennis Ayres	3	Doug Greenall
Alan Davies	4	Bill Finnan
John Etty	5	Frank Carlton
Frank Stirrup (c)	6	Austin Rhodes
Frank Pitchford	7	John Dickinson
Ken Jackson	8	Alan Prescott
Jack Keith	9	Len McIntyre
Don Vines	10	Nat Silcock, Jr.
Sid Little	11	George Parsons
Charlie Winslade	12	Josh Gaskell
Derek Turner	13	Vince Karalius
10	score	3
7	HT	3
	Scorers	
	Tries	
John Etty (1)	T	
	Goals	
	G	
	G	
	Drop Goals	
	DG	
Referee		

Scoring - Try = three (3) points - Goal = two (2) points - Drop goal = two (2) points

=== The road to success ===
First round
Leigh
bye
Blackpool Borough	15
Whitehaven	12
Salford	17
Workington Town	9
Wigan	16
Oldham	18
Warrington	31
Rochdale Hornets	8
Widnes	7
Barrow	17
#REF!	27
Swinton	7
Liverpool City	24
County Amateurs	7

Second round
Leigh	25
Blackpool Borough	3
Salford	0
Oldham	31
Warrington	5
Barrow	2
St. Helens	34
Liverpool City	3

Semifinals
Leigh	9
Oldham	18
Warrington	9
St. Helens	17

Final
Oldham	10
St. Helens	3

== Notes and comments ==
1 * County Amateurs were a Junior (amateur) club from ??
2 * Central Park was the home ground of Wigan with a final capacity of 18,000, although the record attendance was 47,747 for Wigan v St Helens 27 March 1959

== See also ==
- 1956–57 Northern Rugby Football League season
- Rugby league county cups
