= Len McIntyre =

GB international rugby league footballer

Personal information
- Full name: James Leonard McIntyre
- Born: 28 August 1933 Wigan, England
- Died: 25 January 2012 (aged 78) Wigan, England

Playing information
- Height: 5 ft 10 in (1.78 m)
- Weight: 13 st 7 lb (86 kg)
- Position: Hooker
Club
| Years | Team | Pld | T | G | FG | P |
|---|---|---|---|---|---|---|
| 1953–57 | St. Helens | 28 | 8 | 12 | | 48 |
| 1957–59 | Barrow |
| 1959–65 | Oldham | 212 | 29 | 1 | | 89 |
| 1965–66 | Liverpool City |
| 1966–68 | Wigan | 10 |
| 1968–70 | Warrington | 78+2 | 6 | 0 | 0 | 18 |
| 1971 | Widnes | 14 |
| | Total | 344 | 43 | 13 | 0 | 155 |
Representative
| Years | Team | Pld | T | G | FG | P |
| 1958–64 | Lancashire | 5 | 3 | 0 | 0 | 9 |
| 1961 | Rugby League XIII | 1 | 0 | 0 | 0 | 0 |
| 1963 | Great Britain | 1 | 0 | 0 | 0 | 0 |

James Leonard "Len" McIntyre (28 August 1933 – 25 January 2012) was an English professional rugby league footballer who played in the 1950s, 1960s and 1970s. He played at representative level for Great Britain, Rugby League XIII and Lancashire, and at club level for St Helens, Barrow, Oldham, Liverpool City, Wigan, Warrington and Widnes, as a hooker, after retiring from playing he became the Warrington colts (youth team) coach.

== Background ==
Len McIntyre was born in Wigan, Lancashire, England, and he died in Wigan, Greater Manchester, England.

== Playing career ==
=== St Helens ===
McIntyre made his début for St. Helens on Monday 19 April 1954 away to Huddersfield.

Len McIntyre played hooker in St. Helens 13-2 victory over Halifax in the 1956 Challenge Cup Final during the 1955–56 season at Wembley Stadium, London on Saturday 28 April 1956, in front of a crowd of 79,341.

Len McIntyre played hooker in St. Helens' 3-10 defeat by Oldham in the 1956 Lancashire Cup Final during the 1956–57 season at Central Park, Wigan on Saturday 20 October 1956.

He played his last match for St. Helens on Saturday 10 August 1957 home to Barrow before he was transferred from St. Helens to Barrow for £750 (based on increases in average earnings, this would be approximately £37,970 in 2013).

=== Oldham ===
McIntyre was signed by Oldham for a fee of £2,500, and made his début for the club on Saturday 28 February 1959 away to Whitehaven. He was at Oldham during the 1963–64 Division Two Championship winning season.

=== Later career ===
McIntyre was transferred to Liverpool City in December 1965 before being signed by Wigan less than a year later for a fee of £1,000. He made his début for Wigan on Wednesday 24 August 1966 away to Leigh, playing his last match for Wigan on Monday 15 April 1968 home to Salford. He made his début for Warrington on Tuesday 24 September 1968 home to Huyton, playing his last match for Warrington on Saturday 5 December 1970 away to Leeds, in January 1971 he was swapped by Warrington for Widnes prop Brian Larkin (ex-Wigan circa-1963).

=== Representative honours ===
Len McIntyre represented Rugby League XIII while at Oldham in 1961 against New Zealand at White City Stadium, Manchester, and won a cap for Great Britain while at Oldham in the 12-50 defeat by Australia at Station Road, Swinton on Saturday 9 November 1963.

Len McIntyre represented Lancashire while at Oldham.
