= Ken Jackson (rugby league) =

GB international rugby league footballer

Personal information
- Full name: Kenneth Jackson
- Born: c. 1929

Playing information
- Position: Prop
Club
Years	Team	Pld	T	G	FG	P
1949–61	Oldham	243	24			72
Representative
Years	Team	Pld	T	G	FG	P
1951	Lancashire	1	0	0	0	0
1957	Great Britain	2	0	0	0	0

Kenneth Jackson (born c. 1929) is a former professional rugby league footballer who played in the 1940s, 1950s and 1960s. He played at representative level for Great Britain, and at club level for Oldham, as a prop.

== Playing career ==
=== International honours ===
Jackson won caps for Great Britain while at Oldham in 1957 against France (2 matches).

=== County Cup Final appearances ===
About Ken Jackson's time, there was Oldham's 2–12 defeat by Barrow in the 1954 Lancashire Cup Final during the 1954–55 season at Station Road, Swinton on Saturday 23 October 1954, the 10–3 victory over St. Helens in the 1956 Lancashire Cup Final during the 1956–57 season at Station Road, Swinton on Saturday 20 October 1956, and the 12–2 victory over St. Helens in the 1958 Lancashire Cup Final during the 1958–59 season at Station Road, Swinton on Saturday 25 October 1958, he played at prop in Oldham's 13–8 victory over Wigan in the 1957 Lancashire Cup Final during the 1957–58 season at Station Road, Swinton on Saturday 19 October 1957.

=== Testimonial match ===
Jackson's Testimonial match at Oldham took place during the 1959–60 season, along with teammates Charlie Winslade and Jack Keith.

== Honoured in Oldham ==
Jackson Mews in Oldham is named after Ken Jackson.
