= 1997 Oldham Bears season =

- Super League II Rank: 12th (relegated)
- Play-off result: Premiership Trophy preliminary
- Challenge Cup: Quarter final
- 1997 record: Wins: 6; draws: 1; losses: 19
- Points scored: For: 559; against: 731

Team information
- Coach: Andy Goodway (until April); Bob Lindner (May onwards)
- Stadium: Boundary Park
← 1996	List of seasons

The 1997 Oldham Bears season was the 102nd season in the club's rugby league history and the second season in the Super League. The Oldham Bears competed in Super League II and finished bottom of the league in 12th place, relegating them to the Northern Ford Premiership. Following their relegation, the club went into liquidation in October 1997, with debts of over £1 million.

== Table ==
Pos	Team	Pld	W	D	L	PF	PA	PD	Pts	Relegation
1	Bradford Bulls (C)	22	20	0	2	769	397	+372	40	
2	London Broncos	22	15	3	4	616	418	+198	33	
3	St Helens	22	14	1	7	592	506	+86	29	
4	Wigan	22	14	0	8	683	398	+285	28	
5	Leeds Rhinos	22	13	1	8	544	463	+81	27	
6	Salford Reds	22	11	0	11	428	495	−67	22	
7	Halifax Blue Sox	22	8	2	12	524	549	−25	18	
8	Sheffield Eagles	22	9	0	13	415	574	−159	18	
9	Warrington Wolves	22	8	0	14	437	647	−210	16	
10	Castleford Tigers	22	5	2	15	334	515	−181	12	
11	Paris Saint-Germain	22	6	0	16	362	572	−210	12	
12	Oldham Bears (R)	22	4	1	17	461	631	−170	9	Relegated to Division One

Source: Rugby League Project
Rules for classification: 1) Points; 2) Points difference; 3) Number of points scored;
(C) Champions; (R) Relegated

== Squad ==
No	Player
1	Paul Atcheson
2	Scott Ranson
3	Darren Abram
4	Paul Topping
5	Rob Myler
6	Francis Maloney
7	Martin Crompton
8	Ian Gildart
9	John Clarke
10	Jason Temu
11	Gary Lord
12	Joe Faimalo
14	Matt Munro
15	Paul Davidson
16	Howard Hill
17	David Jones
18	Mike Neal
19	Chris McKinney
20	Afi Leuila
21	Jim Cowan
22	Vince Fawcett
23	Brett Goldspink
25	Paul Deacon
26	Luke Goodwin
27	David Stephenson
31	Ian Russell
