= Frank Carlton (rugby league) =

GB & England international rugby league footballer

Personal information
- Full name: Frank Carlton
- Born: 31 March 1936 Blackbrook, St. Helens, England
- Died: 19 February 2009 (aged 72) Whiston Hospital, Whiston, Merseyside, England

Playing information
- Position: Wing, Centre
Club
Years	Team	Pld	T	G	FG	P
1953–60	St. Helens	156	129	0	0	387
1960–65	Wigan	119	95	0	0	285
	Total	275	224	0	0	672
Representative
Years	Team	Pld	T	G	FG	P
1955–56	Lancashire	3	2	0	0	6
1956	England	1	0	0	0	0
1958–62	Great Britain	2	0	0	0	0

Frank Carlton (21 March 1936 – 19 February 2009) was an English professional rugby league footballer who played in the 1950s and 1960s. He played at representative level for Great Britain and England, and at club level for St. Helens, and Wigan, as a wing or centre.

== Background ==
Frank Carlton was born in Blackbrook, St. Helens, Lancashire, England, and he died aged 72 in Whiston Hospital, Whiston, Merseyside, England.

== Playing career ==
=== St Helens ===
Carlton signed for St Helens in 1952, making his first team debut for the club the following year. He scored a try for St Helens in the 1956 Challenge Cup final against Halifax.

Carlton also played on the wing in St Helens' 3-10 defeat by Oldham in the 1956 Lancashire Cup Final during the 1956–57 season at Central Park, Wigan on Saturday 20 October 1956, and played on the wing in the 2-12 defeat by Oldham in the 1958 Lancashire Cup Final during the 1958–59 season at Station Road, Swinton Saturday 25 October 1958.

=== Wigan ===
In October 1960, Carlton was transferred to Wigan for a fee of around £5,000. He made his début for Wigan in the 10-3 victory over Hunslet F.C. at Parkside, Hunslet on Saturday 5 November 1960, he scored his first try (2-tries) for Wigan in the 16-11 victory over Blackpool Borough at Central Park, Wigan on Saturday 19 November 1960, he scored his last try for Wigan in the 12-0 victory over Liverpool City in the Western Division Championship match at Central Park, Wigan on Saturday 28 March 1964.

Carlton announced his retirement in 1965, but did make some appearances during the 1965–66 season after being persuaded to return by Wigan coach Eric Ashton.

=== International honours ===
Frank Carlton won a cap for England while at St. Helens in 1956 against France, and won caps for Great Britain while at St. Helens in 1958 against New Zealand, and in 1962 against New Zealand.

== Honoured at St Helens ==
Frank Carlton is a St Helens R.F.C. Hall of Fame Inductee.
