= 1957–58 Lancashire Cup =

- Structure: Regional knockout championship
- Teams: 14
- Winners: Oldham
- Runners-up: Wigan

1957–58 was the forty-fifth occasion on which the Lancashire Cup completion had been held.
Oldham won the trophy by beating Wigan by the score of 13-8
The match was played at Station Road, Pendlebury, (historically in the county of Lancashire). Another excellent attendance, this season of 42,497 was achieved and the receipts were £6,918
This was the second of Oldham's three consecutive triumphs. 1958 would be the last time they would win the trophy, although they did later appear 4 times as runners-up (in 1966, 1969, 1987 and 1989).

== Background ==
With no invitation to a junior club this season, the total number of teams entering the competition was reduced by one to 14.
The same pre-war fixture format was retained, and due to the number of clubs this resulted in no bye but one “blank” or “dummy” fixture in the first round, and one bye in the second round

== Competition and results ==
=== Round 1 ===
Involved 7 matches (with no bye but one “blank” fixture) and 14 clubs

Game No	Fixture date	Home team	Score	Away team	Venue	Att	Rec	Notes	Ref
1	Sat 31 Aug 1957	Blackpool Borough	9-4	Widnes	St Anne's Road Greyhound Stadium				
2	Sat 31 Aug 1957	Oldham	44-10	Barrow	Watersheddings				
3	Sat 31 Aug 1957	Leigh	28-9	Whitehaven	Kirkhall Lane				
4	Sat 31 Aug 1957	Salford	6-12	Rochdale Hornets	The Willows				
5	Sat 31 Aug 1957	Swinton	10-18	Wigan	Station Road				
6	Sat 31 Aug 1957	Warrington	50-19	Liverpool City	Wilderspool				
7	Sat 31 Aug 1957	Workington Town	12-16	St. Helens	Derwent Park	6,500			
8		blank		blank					

=== Round 2 - quarterfinals ===
Involved 3 matches (with one bye) and 7 clubs

Game No	Fixture date	Home team	Score	Away team	Venue	Att	Rec	Notes	Ref
1	Tue 10 Sep 1957	Oldham	18-12	Warrington	Watersheddings				
2	Wed 11 Sep 1957	Leigh	2-12	Wigan	Kirkhall Lane				
3	Thu 12 Sep 1957	Blackpool Borough	12-28	St. Helens	St Anne's Road Greyhound Stadium	4,000			
4		Rochdale Hornets		bye					

=== Round 3 – semifinals ===
Involved 2 matches and 4 clubs

Game No	Fixture date	Home team	Score	Away team	Venue	Att	Rec	Notes	Ref
1	Tue 01 Oct 1957	Rochdale Hornets	0-52	Wigan	Athletic Grounds				
2	Wed 02 Oct 1957	St. Helens	9-29	Oldham	Knowsley Road	22,000			

=== Final ===
Game No	Fixture date	Home team	Score	Away team	Venue	Att	Rec	Notes	Ref
	Saturday 19 October 1957	Oldham	13-8	Wigan	Station Road	42,497	£6,918	1	

==== Teams and scorers ====
Oldham	№	Wigan
	teams	
Bernard Ganley	1	Jack Cunliffe
Dick Cracknell	2	Bob Chisnall
Vince Nestor	3	Eric Ashton
Alan Davies	4	Ernie Ashcroft
John Etty	5	Terry O'Grady
Frank Daley	6	Billy Boston
Frank Pitchford	7	Dave Bolton
Ken Jackson	8	Alan Armstrong
Jack Keith	9	Bill Sayer
Don Vines	10	Brian McTigue
Charlie Winslade	11	Norman Cherrington
Sid Little	12	Bill Bretherton
Derek Turner	13	Bernard McGurrin
13	score	8
8	HT	0
	Scorers	
	Tries	
Alan Davies (1)	T	Brian McTigue (1)
Bernard Ganley (1)	T	Terry O'Grady (1)
Frank Pitchford (1)	T	
	Goals	
Bernard Ganley (2)	G	Jack Cunliffe (1)
Referee		M. Coates (Pudsey)

Scoring - Try = three (3) points - Goal = two (2) points - Drop goal = two (2) points

=== The road to success ===
First round
Blackpool Borough	9
Widnes	4
Workington Town	12
St. Helens	16
Oldham	44
Barrow	10
Warrington	50
Liverpool City	19
Salford	6
Rochdale Hornets	12
blank
blank
Leigh	28
Whitehaven	9
Swinton	10
Wigan	18

Second round
Blackpool Borough	12
St. Helens	28
Oldham	18
Warrington	12
Rochdale Hornets
bye
Leigh	2
Wigan	12

Semifinals
St. Helens	9
Oldham	29
Rochdale Hornets	52
Wigan	0

Final
Oldham	13
Wigan	8

== Notes and comments ==
1 Station Road was the home ground of Swinton from 1929 to 1932 and at its peak was one of the finest rugby league grounds in the country and it boasted a capacity of 60,000. The actual record attendance was for the Challenge Cup semi-final on 7 April 1951 when 44,621 watched Wigan beat Warrington 3-2

== See also ==
- 1957–58 Northern Rugby Football League season
- Rugby league county cups
