= John Etty =

English rugby league footballer (1927–2024)

Personal information
- Born: 1927 Batley, England
- Died: 29 February 2024 (aged 97) Blackpool, England

Playing information
- Position: Wing, Centre
Club
Years	Team	Pld	T	G	FG	P
1944–55	Batley	346	92	2	0	276
1955–58	Oldham	150	90	0	0	270
1958–61	Wakefield Trinity	57	28	0	0	84
	Total	553	210	2	0	630
Representative
Years	Team	Pld	T	G	FG	P
1947–57	Yorkshire	8	2	0	0	6
≤1951–≥51	British Empire XIII	≥1

John W. Etty (1927 – 29 February 2024) was an English professional rugby league footballer who played between 1944 and 1961. He played at representative level for British Empire XIII and Yorkshire, and at club level for Batley, Oldham and Wakefield Trinity, as a wing or centre.

== Background ==
John W. Etty was born in Batley, West Riding of Yorkshire, England and his birth was registered in Dewsbury, West Riding of Yorkshire, England.

Etty was a pupil at Batley Grammar School between 1937 and 1943. In June 2007, John Etty was invited to a reception for former Bevin Boys at the House of Commons, hosted by Gordon Banks MP, John Etty and wife Kath were introduced to the Prime Minister at No. 10 Downing Street on 25 March 2008, with John Etty receiving his Bevin Boys' Veterans Badge from Prime Minister Gordon Brown, and he lived in Cleveleys, Lancashire as of c. 2008. He died at a hospital in Blackpool on 29 February 2024, at the age of 97.

== Playing career ==
=== International honours ===
Etty was a representative for the British Empire XIII while at Batley against Wales XIII on 19 May 1951, and was an England "reserve to travel" while at Batley against France on Saturday 17 May 1947.

=== County honours ===
Etty was selected for Yorkshire County XIII whilst at Batley during the 1947/48, 1948/49 and 1949/50 seasons.

=== Championship final appearances ===
Etty played on the wing in Oldham's 15–14 victory over Hull F.C. in the Championship Final during the 1956–57 season at Odsal Stadium, Bradford, and played on the wing in Wakefield Trinity's 3–27 defeat by Wigan in the Championship Final during the 1959–60 season at Odsal Stadium, Bradford on Saturday 21 May 1960.

=== County League appearances ===
Etty played in Oldham's victories in the Lancashire League during the 1956–57 season and 1957–58 season, and played in Wakefield Trinity's victory in the Yorkshire League during the 1958–59 season and 1959–60 season.

=== Challenge Cup Final appearances ===
Etty played on the wing in Wakefield Trinity's 38–5 victory over Hull F.C. in the 1959–60 Challenge Cup Final during the 1959–60 season at Wembley Stadium, London on 14 May 1960.

=== County Cup Final appearances ===
Etty played on the wing, and scored a try in Batley's 8–18 defeat by Huddersfield in the 1952 Yorkshire Cup Final during the 1952–53 season at Headingley, Leeds on Saturday 15 November 1952. He played in Oldham's three successive Lancashire Cup victories 1956-8. He played on the wing, and scored a try in Oldham's 10–3 victory over St. Helens in the 1956 Lancashire Cup Final during the 1956–57 season at Central Park, Wigan on Saturday 20 October 1956. He played left wing in the 13–8 victory over Wigan in the 1957 Final during the 1957–58 season at Station Road, Swinton on Saturday 19 October 1957, and in the 12–2 victory over St Helens in the 1958 Final during the 1958–59 season, also at Station Road, on Saturday 25 October 1958. He played left wing and scored a try in Wakefield Trinity's 16–10 victory over Huddersfield in the 1960 Yorkshire Cup Final during the 1960–61 season at Headingley, Leeds on Saturday 29 October 1960.

=== Club career ===
Etty made his debut for Batley in 1944. He was transferred from Batley to Oldham in January 1955. He made his debut for Wakefield Trinity during April 1959 and played his last match for them during the 1960–61 season. He appears to have scored no drop-goals (or field-goals as they are currently known in Australasia), but prior to the 1974–75 season all goals, whether; conversions, penalties, or drop-goals, scored 2-points and thus prior to this date drop-goals were often not explicitly documented. Therefore '0' drop-goals may indicate drop-goals not recorded, rather than no drop-goals scored. In addition, prior to the 1949–50 season, the archaic field-goal was also still a valid means of scoring points.

=== All Six Cups ===
Only five rugby league footballers have won "All Six Cups" during their career, they are; Aubrey Casewell (while at Salford and Leeds), Alan Edwards (while at Salford and Bradford Northern), John Etty (while at Oldham and Wakefield Trinity), Edward "Ted" Slevin (while at Wigan and Huddersfield), and Derek Turner (while at Oldham and Wakefield Trinity). "All Six Cups" comprises the Challenge Cup, Rugby Football League Championship, Lancashire Cup, Lancashire League, Yorkshire Cup and Yorkshire League.

== Honoured at Batley and Oldham ==
Etty was invited by the Batley RLFC board of directors to officially open the Heritage Stand at Mount Pleasant, Batley on Sunday 12 August 1990. He was also bestowed an Honorary Life Membership of Batley RLFC on the same day. He is an Oldham Hall of Fame Inductee.
