= 1996 Oldham Bears season =

- Super League I Rank: 8th
- Challenge Cup: Fourth Round
- 1996 record: Wins: 9; draws: 1; losses: 13
- Points scored: For: 733; against: 637

Team information
- Coach: Andy Goodway
- Stadium: Watersheddings
List of seasons	1997 →

The 1996 Oldham Bears season was the club's first season in the Super League. Coached by Andy Goodway, the Oldham Bears competed in Super League I and finished in 8th place. The club also reached the fourth round of the Challenge Cup.

== Table ==
Super League I
Pos	Team	Pld	W	D	L	PF	PA	PD	Pts	Qualification or relegation
1	St Helens (C)	22	20	0	2	950	455	+495	40	Qualified for Premiership semi final
2	Wigan	22	19	1	2	902	326	+576	39	Qualified for Premiership semi final
3	Bradford Bulls	22	17	0	5	767	409	+358	34	Qualified for Premiership semi final
4	London Broncos	22	12	1	9	611	462	+149	25	Qualified for Premiership semi final
5	Warrington Wolves	22	12	0	10	569	565	+4	24	
6	Halifax Blue Sox	22	10	1	11	667	576	+91	21	
7	Sheffield Eagles	22	10	0	12	599	730	−131	20	
8	Oldham Bears	22	9	1	12	473	681	−208	19	
9	Castleford Tigers	22	9	0	13	548	599	−51	18	
10	Leeds	22	6	0	16	555	745	−190	12	
11	Paris Saint-Germain	22	3	1	18	398	795	−397	7	
12	Workington Town (R)	22	2	1	19	325	1021	−696	5	Relegated to Division One

Source: Rugby League Project
Rules for classification: 1) Points; 2) Points difference; 3) Number of points scored;
(C) Champions; (R) Relegated

== Squad ==
Statistics include appearances and points in the Super League and Challenge Cup.

Player	Apps	Tries	Goals	DGs	Points
Darren Abram	16	8	0	0	32
Paul Atcheson	22	11	0	0	44
Adrian Belle	20	8	0	0	32
David Bradbury	20	7	0	0	28
Gary Burns	7	1	0	0	4
John Clarke	16	3	0	0	12
Jimmy Cowan	3	0	0	0	0
Martin Crompton	20	9	0	3	39
Paul Crook	13	0	3	0	6
Paul Davidson	16	3	0	0	12
Joe Faimalo	22	4	0	0	16
Steve Gartland	2	0	1	0	2
Ian Gildart	22	0	0	0	0
Reece Guy	7	0	0	0	0
Howard Hill	13	1	0	0	4
Shaun Irwin	1	0	0	0	0
Afi Leuila	5	0	0	0	0
Gary Lord	21	0	0	0	0
Chris McKinney	4	1	0	0	4
Francis Maloney	20	7	45	0	118
Matt Munro	19	5	0	0	20
Robert Myler	11	4	0	0	16
Mike Neal	5	2	0	0	8
Paul Norman	1	0	0	0	0
Tony Nuttall	3	0	0	0	0
Andrew Patmore	13	3	0	0	12
Scott Ranson	7	5	0	0	20
Craig Richards	1	0	0	0	0
Ian Sherratt	9	1	0	0	4
Peter Smith	2	0	0	0	0
Paul Stevens	3	0	0	0	0
Jason Temu	17	1	0	0	4
Paul Topping	22	1	18	0	40
