= Alan Kellett =

English rugby league footballer and coach

Personal information
- Full name: Alan Kellett
- Born: 6 October 1937; Halifax, England
- Died: October 2006 (aged 68–69)

Playing information
- Position: Stand-off, Loose forward
Club
Years	Team	Pld	T	G	FG	P
1954–55	Halifax	2	1	0	0	3
1955–63	Oldham	197	76	4	0	236
1963–66	Halifax	107	21	12	0	87
1966–68	Bradford Northern	51	14	1	0	44
1968–70	Keighley	60	8	3	0	30
1970	Bradford Northern	11	1	1	0	5
1970–71	Halifax	19	1	6	0	15
1971–72	Oldham	9	0	2	0	4
	Total	456	122	29	0	424
Representative
Years	Team	Pld	T	G	FG	P
1958–65	Yorkshire	9	7	0	0	21

Coaching information
Club
Years	Team	Gms	W	D	L	W%
1968	Keighley
1973–75	Keighley
1976–77	Halifax
1979–80	Keighley
1986	Carlisle RLFC
	Total	0	0	0	0

Alan Kellett (1937–2006) was an English former professional rugby league footballer who played in the 1950s, 1960s and 1970s, and coached in the 1960s and 1970s. He played at representative level for Yorkshire, and at club level for Ovenden ARLFC (in Ovenden, Halifax), Oldham (two spells), Halifax, Bradford Northern and Keighley, as a stand-off or loose forward, and coached at club level for Keighley.

== Background ==
Alan Kellett's birth was registered in Halifax, West Riding of Yorkshire, England.

== Playing career ==
=== Early career ===
Kellett started his rugby league career as an amateur with Ovenden. In November 1954, he made two appearances for Halifax due to an injury to first choice stand-off Ken Dean.

=== Oldham ===
Kellett was signed by Oldham in February 1955. He made his debut in March 1955 against Belle Vue Rangers.

Kellett played stand-off, and scored a try in Oldham's 2–12 victory over St. Helens in the 1958–59 Lancashire Cup Final during the 1958–59 season at Station Road, Swinton on Saturday 25 October 1958, in front of a crowd of 38,780.

=== Halifax ===
After eight seasons with Oldham, Kellett returned to Halifax in August 1963 for a transfer fee of £4,500.

Kellett played in Halifax's 15–7 victory over St. Helens in the 1964–65 Championship Final at Station Road, Swinton on Saturday 22 May 1965.

=== Later career ===
In 1966, Kellett moved to Bradford Northern. In January 1968, he joined Keighley as player-coach, before returning to Bradford Northern two years later.

In November 1970 he joined Halifax for a third spell, before finishing his playing career with one final season at Oldham.

== Coaching career ==
Kellett had a second spell as coach at Keighley between January 1973 and May 1975. He was appointed as coach at Halifax in 1976, but resigned in April 1977 following a disagreement with the club's board. Kellett coached at Keighley for a third time from April 1979 to April 1980.
