= Dick Cracknell =

Great Britain and England international rugby league footballer

Personal information
- Full name: Richard Cracknell
- Born: 1929 Huddersfield, England
- Died: April 2016 (aged 87)

Playing information
- Position: Wing
Club
Years	Team	Pld	T	G	FG	P
≤1951–53	Huddersfield
1953–59	Oldham	213	119	28	0	413
	Total	213	119	28	0	413
Representative
Years	Team	Pld	T	G	FG	P
1951–53	England	5	3	0	0	9
1951	Great Britain	2	2	0	0	6

Richard Cracknell (1929 – 2016) was an English former professional rugby league footballer who played in the 1950s. He played at representative level for Great Britain and England, and at club level for Huddersfield and Oldham, as a wing.

== Background ==
Dick Cracknell's birth was registered in Huddersfield district, West Riding of Yorkshire, England.

== Playing career ==
=== Huddersfield ===
Cracknell played on the wing in Huddersfield's 2–20 defeat by Wigan in the Championship Final during the 1949–50 season at Maine Road, Manchester on Saturday 13 May 1950.

=== Oldham ===
About Dick Cracknell's time, there was Oldham's 2–12 defeat by Barrow in the 1954 Lancashire Cup Final during the 1954–55 season at Station Road, Swinton on Saturday 23 October 1954, the 10–3 victory over St. Helens in the 1956 Lancashire Cup Final during the 1956–57 season at Station Road, Swinton on Saturday 20 October 1956, and the 12–2 victory over St. Helens in the 1958 Lancashire Cup Final during the 1958–59 season at Station Road, Swinton on Saturday 25 October 1958, he played on the wing in Oldham's 13–8 victory over Wigan in the 1957 Lancashire Cup Final during the 1957–58 season at Station Road, Swinton on Saturday 19 October 1957.

=== International honours ===
Cracknell won caps for England while at Huddersfield in 1951 against France, in 1952 against Other Nationalities, in 1953 against France, and Wales, while at Oldham in 1953 against France, and won caps for Great Britain while at Huddersfield in 1951 against New Zealand (2 matches).

Cracknell also represented Great Britain in one non-Test match while at Huddersfield in the 12–22 defeat by France at Parc des Princes, Paris on 22 May 1952.

== Personal life ==
Dick Cracknell was the son of the rugby league second-row for Leeds, Huddersfield and Swinton, and the landlord of The Railway Hotel public house in Lockwood, Huddersfield; Richard Hammond Cracknell.
