= Frank Stirrup =

English rugby league footballer

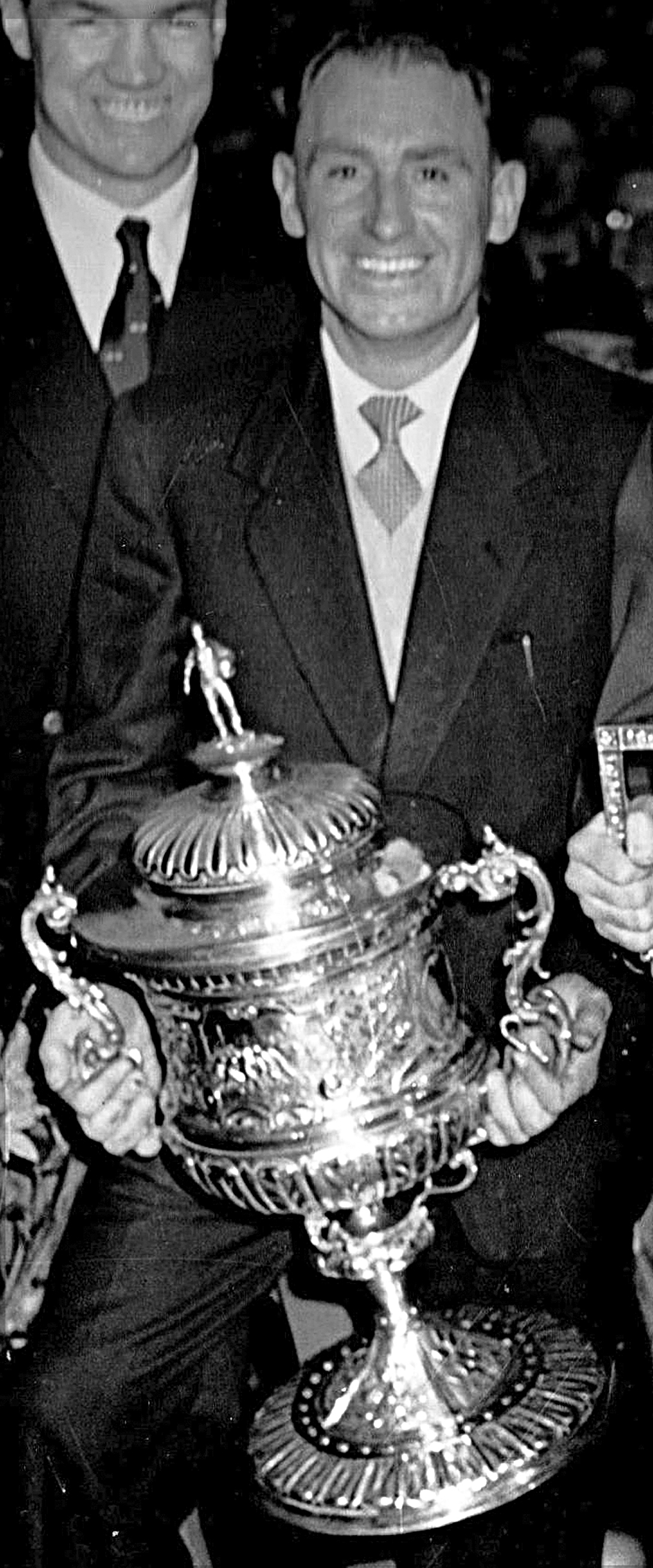
- Frank Stirrup holding the Lancashire League Championship trophy (1956-57)

Personal information
- Full name: Francis Stirrup
- Born: 1925 Leigh, England
- Died: 2 February 2013 (aged 88)

Playing information
- Position: Fullback, Wing, Stand-off, Scrum-half
Club
Years	Team	Pld	T	G	FG	P
1946–48	Leigh	12	1	0	0	3
≤1950–50	Salford
1951–60	Oldham	224	49	8		163
	Total	236	50	8	0	166
Representative
Years	Team	Pld	T	G	FG	P
1952–53	Lancashire	4	2	0	0	6

Francis "Frank" Stirrup (1925 – 2 February 2013), also known by the nickname of "Mr Football", was an English professional rugby league footballer who played in the 1950s and 1960s. He played at representative level for Lancashire, and at club level for Culcheth ARLFC (near Warrington), Leigh, Salford and Oldham (captain), as a fullback, wing, stand-off, or scrum-half.

== Personal life ==
Frank Stirrup's birth was registered in Leigh, Lancashire, England. He was the son of James Stirrup and Ellen (Cunningham), and brother of James Roy Stirrup (b. 1926). While playing for Leigh in 1946 he married Margaret Swann. The same year Margaret would give birth to a son, Francis, in Urmston (Manchester). Four years later he would briefly sign for Salford before moving to Oldham. His career with the Oldham club began in a game versus Belle Vue Rangers at Watersheddings on January 20, 1951. Following retirement, he returned to Leigh where he died on 2 February 2013. His funeral service was held at St Josephs R.C. Church.

== Playing career ==
During his career at Oldham the team would come second in League in the 1954-55 season, and then lose in the Championship Final (see below). The team would top the League table in both the 1956-57 season and the 1957-58 season, winning the Championship title in the Play-off Final of 1956-57 (see below). Oldham would also win the Lancashire County Cup (see below) three times in 1955–56, 1956–57 and 1957–58, and be champions of the Lancashire League twice in 1956–57 and 1957–58. He would play for the Oldham club (Heritage no. 562) for nine years, appearing in over 200 games.

=== Championship final appearances ===
Frank Stirrup played in Oldham's 3–7 defeat by Warrington in the Championship Final during the 1954–55 season, and played, and was captain, in the 15–14 victory over Hull F.C. in the Championship Final during the 1956–57 season. After the victory, he became the first Oldham skipper to lift the trophy since a victory that happened 20 years before.

=== County Cup Final appearances ===
In the 1954-55 season Oldham lost 2–12 to Barrow in the Lancashire Cup Final at Station Road, Swinton on Saturday 23 October 1954. In the 1956 final, Stirrup played stand-off, and was captain in Oldham's 10–3 victory over St. Helens at Station Road, Swinton on Saturday 20 October 1956. Due to injury, he missed the 13–8 victory over Wigan in the 1957 Lancashire Cup Final at Station Road, Swinton on Saturday 19 October 1957. However he would play scrum-half, and captain the team, the next season in their 12–2 victory over St. Helens in the 1958 Lancashire Cup Final at Station Road, Swinton on Saturday 25 October 1958.

== Honoured at Oldham ==
Frank Stirrup is an Oldham Hall Of Fame Inductee.
