= John Dickinson (rugby league) =

England international rugby league footballer (1934–2021)

Personal information
- Full name: John Dickinson
- Born: 10 April 1934 St Helens, Merseyside, England
- Died: 7 August 2021 (aged 87) St Helens, Merseyside, England

Playing information
- Position: Fullback, Wing, Centre, Stand-off, Scrum-half
Club
Years	Team	Pld	T	G	FG	P
1950–57	St. Helens	160	42	2	0	130
1957–≥57	Leigh
≥1957–≥57	Rochdale Hornets
	Total	160	42	2	0	130
Representative
Years	Team	Pld	T	G	FG	P
1956	England	1	0	0	0	0

John Dickinson (10 April 1934 – 7 August 2021), also known by the nickname of "Todder", was an English professional rugby league footballer who played in the 1950s, and coached in the 1960s. He played at representative level for England, and at club level for St. Helens, Leigh and Rochdale Hornets, as a fullback, wing, centre, stand-off, or scrum-half, and coached at club level for the Pilkington Recs ARLFC.

== Playing career ==
=== County Cup Final appearances ===
Dickinson played scrum-half in St. Helens' 3–10 defeat by Oldham in the 1956 Lancashire Cup Final during the 1956–57 season at Central Park, Wigan on Saturday 20 October 1956.

=== International honours ===
Dickinson won a cap for England while at St. Helens in 1956 against France.

== Personal life ==
Dickinson died on 7 August 2021, at the age of 87.
