= Frank Pitchford =

GB and England international rugby league footballer

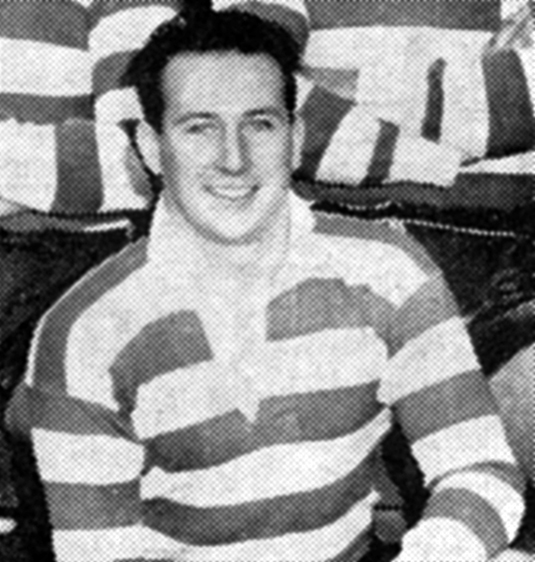
- Frank Pitchford in Oldham RLFC colours, 1959

Personal information
- Full name: Frank Pitchford
- Born: 1934
- Died: January 1990 (aged 55) Leigh, Greater Manchester, England

Playing information
- Position: Scrum-half
Club
Years	Team	Pld	T	G	FG	P
1952–62	Oldham	305	105	1		317
1962–63	Wigan	27	4	0		12
	Total	332	109	1	0	329
Representative
Years	Team	Pld	T	G	FG	P
1955	England	1
1958–1962	Great Britain	2

Frank Pitchford (1934 – January 1990) was an English professional rugby league footballer who played in the 1950s and 1960s. He represented both Great Britain and England, and at club level played for Oldham and Wigan as a Scrum-half.

Born in Leigh in 1934, Pitchford began his career with amateur side Leigh St Joseph’s before signing for Oldham at the start of the 1952–53 season. He spent ten years with the club, making more than 300 appearances and scoring 105 tries. In 1962 he transferred to Wigan, playing a further season that included the 1963 Challenge Cup Final alongside former Oldham teammate Alan Davies.

== Playing career ==
During Pitchford’s time with Oldham, the team finished runners-up in the 1954–55 league campaign and lost 3–7 to Warrington in the Championship Final, with Pitchford scoring Oldham’s only try. Oldham topped the league table in both 1956–57 and 1957–58, winning the Championship title in 1956–57 by defeating Hull FC 15–14 at Odsal Stadium. The club also won the Lancashire Cup three times (1955–56, 1956–57, 1957–58) and the Lancashire League twice (1956–57, 1957–58).

=== Lancashire County Cup Final appearances ===
Pitchford appeared in four Lancashire County Cup Finals for Oldham:

- a 2–12 defeat by Barrow in the 1954 Final at Station Road, Swinton on 23 October 1954
- a 10–3 victory over St Helens in the 1956 Final at Station Road on 20 October 1956
- a 13–8 win against Wigan in the 1957 Final at Station Road on 19 October 1957, in which Pitchford scored a try
- and a 12–2 victory over St Helens in the 1958 Final at Station Road on 25 October 1958.

=== International honours ===
Pitchford won a cap for England while at Oldham in 1955 against Other Nationalities, and two caps for Great Britain, against New Zealand in 1958 and France in 1962.
