= Sid Little =

GB international rugby league & union footballer

Personal information
- Full name: Sidney Devereux Little
- Born: c. 1930; Kirkbride, Cumberland, England
- Died: 27 July 2017 (aged 87)

Playing information

Rugby union
- Position: Prop
Club
| Years | Team | Pld | T | G | FG | P |
|---|---|---|---|---|---|---|
| 195?–52 | Harlequin F.C. |
Representative
| Years | Team | Pld | T | G | FG | P |
| 1952 | Cumberland |

Rugby league
- Position: Prop, Second-row
Club
| Years | Team | Pld | T | G | FG | P |
|---|---|---|---|---|---|---|
| 1952–59 | Oldham | 249 | 49 | 0 | 0 | 147 |
Representative
| Years | Team | Pld | T | G | FG | P |
| 195?–5? | Cumberland | 8 |
| 1956–58 | Great Britain | 10 | 3 | 0 | 0 | 9 |

Sidney Devereux Little OBE (c. 1930 – 27 July 2017) was an English rugby union and professional rugby league footballer who played in the 1950s. He played representative level rugby union (RU) for Cumberland, and at club level for Harlequin F.C., as a prop and representative level rugby league (RL) for Great Britain and Cumberland, and at club level for Oldham, as a prop or second-row. Little is an Oldham Hall Of Fame Inductee.

== Background ==
Little was born in Kirkbride, Cumberland, and grew up in the nearby village Burgh by Sands.

== Playing career ==
=== Oldham ===
About Little's time, there was Oldham's 2–12 defeat by Barrow in the 1954 Lancashire Cup Final during the 1954–55 season at Station Road, Swinton on Saturday 23 October 1954, the 10–3 victory over St. Helens in the 1956 Lancashire Cup Final during the 1956–57 season at Station Road, Swinton on Saturday 20 October 1956, and the 12–2 victory over St. Helens in the 1958 Lancashire Cup Final during the 1958–59 season at Station Road, Swinton on Saturday 25 October 1958, he played at second-row in Oldham's 13–8 victory over Wigan in the 1957 Lancashire Cup Final during the 1957–58 season at Station Road, Swinton on Saturday 19 October 1957.

Little retired towards the end of the 1958–59 season. In 2005, Little was among the nine players inducted into Oldham's Hall of Fame.

=== Representative career ===
In rugby union, Little won caps for Cumberland (RU) while at Harlequin F.C. He played back row for NW Counties against the 1951 Springboks at Birkenhead Park.

In rugby league, Little won 10 caps for Great Britain while at Oldham between 1956 and 1958. He made his début against Australia on 15 December 1956, scoring one try in a 19–0 victory over the Kangaroos. He played in all three matches for Great Britain at the 1957 Rugby League World Cup. He also won caps at county level for Cumberland.

== Military career ==
Little joined the RAF in 1970, and was appointed an OBE for services to the Air Training Corps in the 1982 New Year Honours list.
