= Bernard Ganley =

GB international rugby league footballer (1927-2009)

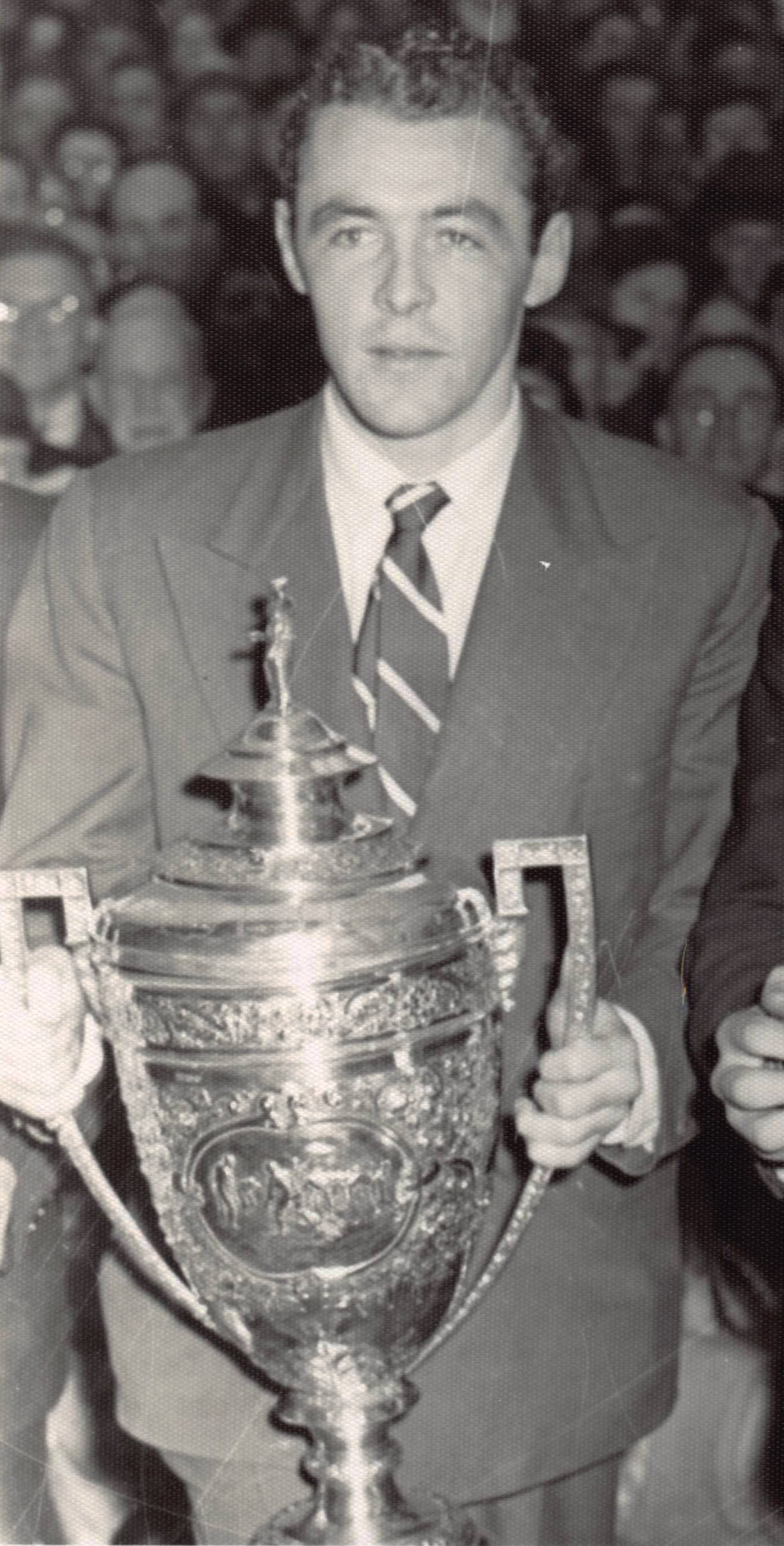
- Bernard Ganley holding the League Championship trophy (1956-57 season)

Personal information
- Full name: William Bernard Ganley
- Born: 27 January 1927; Leigh, England
- Died: 26 June 2009 (aged 82); Knutsford, England

Playing information
- Position: Fullback
Club
| Years | Team | Pld | T | G | FG | P |
|---|---|---|---|---|---|---|
| 1951–61 | Oldham | 341 | 15 | 1,358 | 0 | 2,761 |
Representative
| Years | Team | Pld | T | G | FG | P |
| ≥1951–≤61 | Lancashire |
| 1957–58 | Great Britain | 3 | 1 | 19 | 0 | 41 |

William Bernard Ganley (27 January 1927 – 26 June 2009), also known by the nickname of "The Maestro", was an English professional rugby league footballer who played in the 1950s and 1960s. He played at representative level for Great Britain and Lancashire, and at club level for Oldham, as a fullback. He was justifiably regarded as one of the greatest goalkickers in the game's history.

== Personal life ==
Bernard Ganley was born in Leigh, Lancashire, England. He was the son of the rugby league footballer who played in the 1910s and 1920s for Leigh, Huddersfield and Leeds; W. Herbert "Bert" Ganley. He signed for Oldham FC in August 1950, and played for the club for 10 years. Following retirement he married Maxine Turner in Macclesfield, Cheshire in 1968. The couple had two sons who survived infancy: Alexander Timothy (b. 1972) and James Bernard (b. 1975). Bernard died aged 82 in Knutsford, Cheshire, England.

== Playing career ==
During his career at Oldham, the team would come second in League in the 1954-55 season, and then lose in the Championship Final 3-7 to Warrington. The team would top the League table in both the 1956-57 season and the 1957-58 season, winning the Championship title in the Play-off Final of 1956-57, beating Hull FC at Odsal Stadium by 15 pts. to 14. Oldham would also win the Lancashire County Cup (see below) three times in 1955–56, 1956–57 and 1957–58, and be champions of the Lancashire League twice in 1956–57 and 1957–58. He would play for the Oldham club (Heritage no. 566) for 10 years, appearing in nearly 350 games.

=== International honours ===
Bernard Ganley won caps for Great Britain while at Oldham; he played fullback, and scored 1-try and 5-goals in the 25–14 victory over France at Stadium Municipal, Toulouse on Sunday 3 November 1957, played fullback, and scored 10-goals in the 44–15 victory over France at Central Park, Wigan on Saturday 23 November 1957, and played fullback, and scored four goals in the 23–9 victory over France at Stade des Alpes, Grenoble on Sunday 2 March 1958.

=== County Cup Final appearances ===
Ganley played in four Lancashire County Cup Finals for Oldham: Firstly in their 2-12 loss to Barrow in the 1954 Cup Final at Station Road, Swinton on Saturday 23 October 1954; then played in their 10-3 victory over St. Helens in the 1956 Cup Final at Station Road, Swinton on Saturday 20 October 1956; then he played fullback, and scored a try, and two goals in Oldham's 13-8 victory over Wigan in the 1957 Cup Final at Station Road, Swinton on Saturday 19 October 1957 in front of a crowd of 42,497; and finally, playing fullback in the 12-2 victory over St. Helens in the 1958 Lancashire Cup Final during the 1958–59 season at Station Road, Swinton on Saturday 25 October 1958, in front of a crowd of 38,780.

=== Career records ===
Bernard Ganley holds Oldham's "Most Goals In A Game" record with 14 goals scored against Liverpool City in a match during 1959, and holds Oldham's "Most Points In A Career " record with 2,775 (2,761) points.

== Honoured at Oldham ==
Bernard Ganley is an Oldham Hall of Fame inductee.
