= 1958–59 Lancashire Cup =

- Structure: Regional knockout championship
- Teams: 14
- Winners: Oldham
- Runners-up: St. Helens

The 1958 Rugby League Lancashire Cup competition

1958–59 was the forty-sixth occasion on which the Lancashire Cup completion had been held.
Oldham won the trophy by beating St. Helens by the score of 12-2
The match was played at Station Road, Pendlebury, (historically in the county of Lancashire). The attendance was 38,780 and receipts were £6,933; another excellent attendance.
This was the third (and final one) of Oldham's three consecutive triumphs. It would be the last time they would win the trophy, although they did later appear 4 times as runners-up (in 1966, 1969, 1987 and 1989).

== Background ==
With again no invitation to a junior club this season, the total number of teams entering the competition remained the same at 14.
The same pre-war fixture format was retained, and due to the number of clubs this resulted in no bye but one “blank” or “dummy” fixture in the first round, and one bye in the second round.

== Competition and results ==
=== Round 1 ===
Involved 7 matches (with no bye but one “blank” fixture) and 14 clubs

Game No	Fixture date	Home team	Score	Away team	Venue	Att	Rec	Notes	Ref
1	Sat 30 Aug 1958	Warrington	10-16	Leigh	Wilderspool				
2	Sat 30 Aug 1958	Widnes	44-13	Salford	Naughton Park				
3	Sat 30 Aug 1958	Workington Town	25-12	Liverpool City	Derwent Park				
4	Sat 30 Aug 1958	Rochdale Hornets	15-20	St. Helens	Athletic Grounds	8,257			
5	Sat 30 Aug 1958	Swinton	12-31	Wigan	Station Road				
6	Sat 30 Aug 1958	Oldham	49-5	Whitehaven	Watersheddings				
7	Sat 30 Aug 1958	Barrow	28-12	Blackpool Borough	Craven Park				
8		blank		blank					

=== Round 2 - quarterfinals ===
Involved 3 matches (with one bye) and 7 clubs

Game No	Fixture date	Home team	Score	Away team	Venue	Att	Rec	Notes	Ref
1	Mon 08 Sep 1958	Barrow	23-17	Workington Town	Craven Park				
2	Mon 08 Sep 1958	Leigh	2-12	St. Helens	Kirkhall Lane	14,800			
3	Tue 16 Sep 1958	Oldham	19-7	Wigan	Watersheddings				
4		Widnes		bye					

=== Round 3 – semifinals ===
Involved 2 matches and 4 clubs

Game No	Fixture date	Home team	Score	Away team	Venue	Att	Rec	Notes	Ref
1	Wed 17 Sep 1958	St. Helens	18-6	Barrow	Knowsley Road	23,000			
2	Tue 30 Sep 1958	Oldham	9-4	Widnes	Watersheddings				

=== Final ===
Game No	Fixture date	Home team	Score	Away team	Venue	Att	Rec	Notes	Ref
	Saturday 25 October 1958	Oldham	12-2	St. Helens	Station Road	38,780	£6,933		

==== Teams and scorers ====
Oldham	№	St. Helens
	teams	
Bernard Ganley	1	Peter Fearis
Dick Cracknell	2	Tom van Vollenhoven
Alan Davies	3	Doug Greenall
John Noon	4	Ken Large
John Etty	5	Frank Carlton
Alan Kellett	6	Brian Howard
Frank Stirrup (c)	7	Alex Murphy
Ron Rowbottom	8	Abe Terry
Jack Keith	9	Tom McKinney
Ken Jackson	10	Derek Brown
Charlie Winslade	11	Brian Briggs
Des McKeown	12	Walter Delves
Derek Turner	13	Vince Karalius
12	score	2
7	HT	2
	Scorers	
	Tries	
	T	
	T	
	Goals	
	G	
	G	
	Drop Goals	
	DG	
Referee		R. Gelder, Wakefield

Scoring - Try = three (3) points - Goal = two (2) points - Drop goal = two (2) points

=== The road to success ===
First round
Oldham	49
Whitehaven	5
Swinton	12
Wigan	31
Widnes	44
Salford	13
blank
blank
Warrington	10
Leigh	16
Rochdale Hornets	15
St. Helens	20
Barrow	28
Blackpool Borough	12
Workington Town	25
Liverpool City	12

Second round
Oldham	19
Wigan	7
Widnes
bye
Leigh	2
St. Helens	12
Barrow	23
Workington Town	17

Semifinals
Oldham	9
Widnes	4
St. Helens	18
Barrow	6

Final
Oldham	12
St. Helens	2

== Notes and comments ==
1 Station Road was the home ground of Swinton from 1929 to 1992 and at its peak was one of the finest rugby league grounds in the country and it boasted a capacity of 60,000. The actual record attendance was for the Challenge Cup semi-final on 7 April 1951 when 44,621 watched Wigan beat Warrington 3-2

== See also ==
- 1958–59 Northern Rugby Football League season
- Rugby league county cups
