= David Stephenson (rugby league, born 1972) =

English rugby league footballer

Personal information
- Born: 6 October 1972 (age 52); Leeds, England

Playing information
- Position: Fullback
Club
Years	Team	Pld	T	G	FG	P
1993–97	Oldham Bears	59	5	0	0	20
1998	Hull Sharks	27	7	0	0	28
2001–03	Rochdale Hornets	204	33			132
	Total	290	45	0	0	180
- Source: RLP

David Stephenson (born 6 October 1972) is an English professional rugby league footballer who played in the 1990s and 2000s. He played at club level for Oldham Bears, Hull Sharks and Rochdale Hornets, as a prop, hooker, positions, or loose forward.

He started his career with Milford Marlins and Queens when he represented Great Britain under 18/s against the Australian schoolboys in 1991 winning the man of the match award.

He played an off-season in Australia in 1993, with Barrie McDermott, for Wyong Roos.

A tough uncompromising player who was a fans favourite at each club he played at.

After retiring he returned to his first junior club Milford Marlins coaching
