= Charlie Winslade =

GB & Wales international rugby league footballer

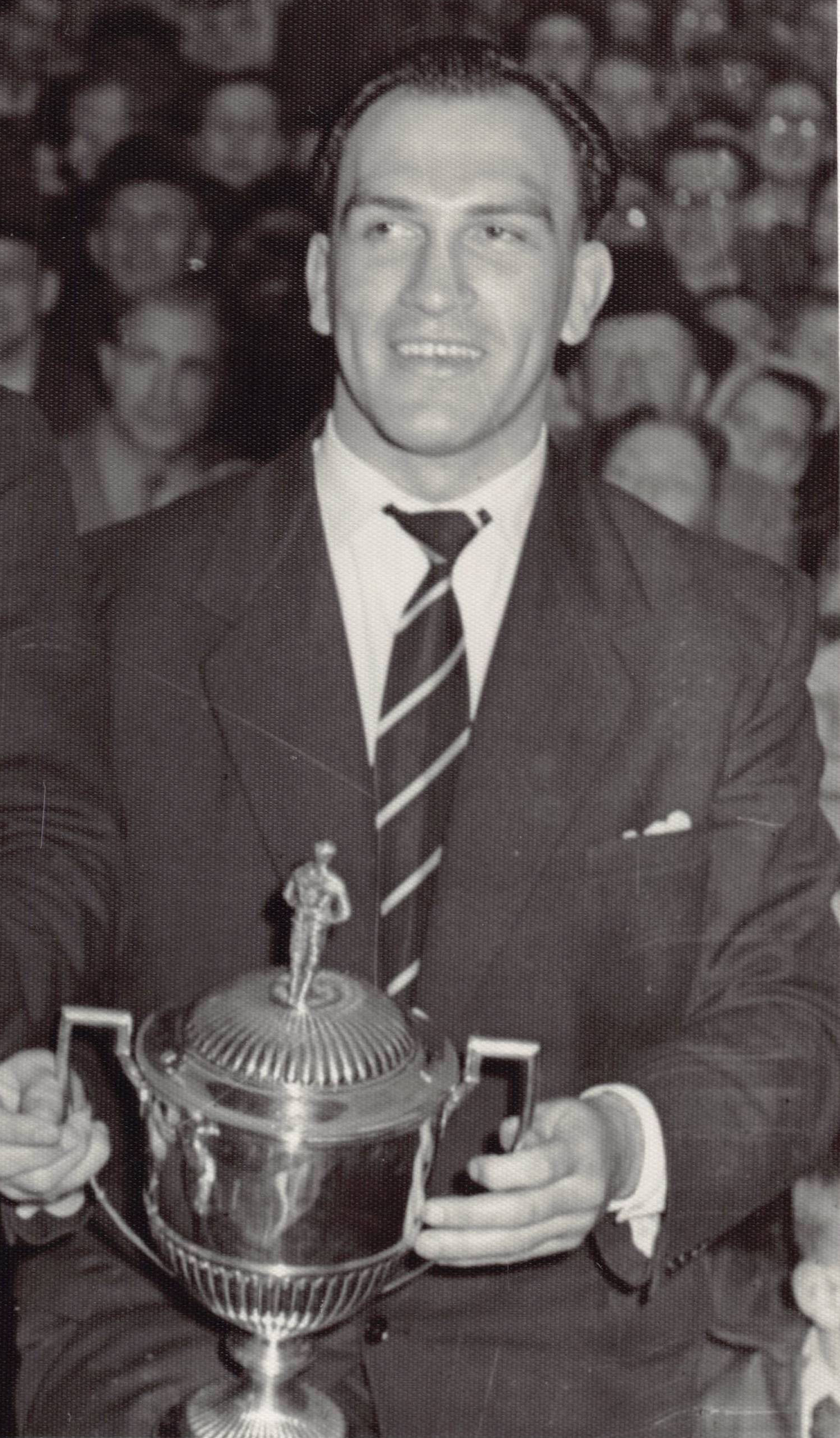
- Charlie Winslade holding the Law Cup won by Oldham RLFC in 1956

Personal information
- Full name: Charles Winslade
- Born: 21 November 1931 Maesteg, Wales
- Died: 6 October 1993 (aged 61) Cardiff, Wales

Playing information
- Height: 6 ft 2 in (1.88 m)
- Weight: 17 st 0 lb (108 kg)

Rugby union
Club
Years	Team	Pld	T	G	FG	P
	Maesteg RFC

Rugby league
- Position: Second-row, Loose forward
Club
Years	Team	Pld	T	G	FG	P
1950–62	Oldham	358	30	2	0	94
1961–67	Warrington	155+4	1	0	0	3
1967	Leigh	7	0	0	0	0
	Total	524	31	2	0	97
Representative
Years	Team	Pld	T	G	FG	P
1965	Other Nationalities	1
1952–63	Wales	6	1	0	0	3
1959	Great Britain	1	0	0	0	0

Charles Winslade (21 November 1931 – 6 October 1993) was a Welsh rugby union and professional rugby league footballer who played in the 1940s, 1950s and 1960s. He played club level rugby union (RU) for Maesteg RFC, and County level for Glamorgan. He played rugby league (RL) at club level for Oldham FC (Heritage no. 560), Warrington and Leigh, as a second-row, loose forward or prop and at representative level for Great Britain, Wales and Other Nationalities.

== Background ==
Charlie Winslade was born in Maesteg, Wales in 1931, he married Hilda Sinfield in 1953 at Greenacres Congregational Church, Oldham, and he died aged 61 in Cardiff, Wales.

== Playing career ==
Charlie Winslade changed rugby football codes from rugby union to rugby league when he transferred from Maesteg RFC to Oldham FC. He made his début for Oldham on Saturday 21 October 1950. During his career at Oldham the team would come second in League in the 1954-55 season, and then lose in the Championship Final to Warrington (see below). The team would top the League table in both the 1956-57 season and the 1957-58 season, winning the Championship title in the Play-off Final of 1956-57 (see below). Oldham would also win the Lancashire County Cup (see below) three times in 1955–56, 1956–57 and 1957–58, and be champions of the Lancashire League twice in 1956–57 and 1957–58. He would play for the Oldham club for 11 years, appearing in over 350 games. He played his last match for Oldham on Saturday 14 October 1961, before being transferred to Warrington. He made his début for Warrington on Saturday 18 November 1961, and he played his last match on Monday 2 January 1967. Finally, he was transferred to Leigh, where he played just seven games before retirement.

=== Championship final appearances ===
Charlie Winslade played left-second-row in Oldham's 3-7 defeat by Warrington in the 1954–55 Championship Final during the 1954–55 season on Saturday 14 May 1955, and played right-second-row, i.e number 12, in the 15-14 victory over Hull F.C. in the 1956–57 Championship Final during the 1954–55 season at Odsal Stadium, Bradford on Saturday 18 May 1957.

=== County Cup Final appearances ===
Charlie Winslade played left-second-row in Oldham's 2-12 defeat by Barrow in the 1954–55 Lancashire Cup Final during the 1954–55 season at Station Road, Swinton on Saturday 23 October 1954, and played right-second-row in the 10-3 victory over St. Helens in the 1956–57 Lancashire Cup Final during the 1956–57 season at Station Road, Swinton on Saturday 20 October 1956, played left-second-row in the 13-8 victory over Wigan in the 1957–58 Lancashire Cup Final during the 1957–58 season at Station Road, Swinton on Saturday 19 October 1957, played left-second-row in the 12-2 victory over St. Helens in the 1958–59 Lancashire Cup Final during the 1958–59 season at Station Road, Swinton on Saturday 25 October 1958, and played right-prop in Warrington's 16-5 victory over Rochdale Hornets in the 1965–66 Lancashire Cup Final during the 1965–66 season at Knowsley Road, St. Helens on Friday 29 October 1965.

=== International honours ===
Charlie Winslade won caps for Wales (RL) while at Oldham and Warrington 1952…1963 6-caps, and won a cap for Great Britain (RL) while at Oldham in 1959 against France, and represented Other Nationalities (RL) while at Warrington, he played left-second-row in the 2-19 defeat by St. Helens at Knowsley Road, St. Helens on Wednesday 27 January 1965, to mark the switching-on of new floodlights.

=== Testimonial match ===
Charlie Winslade's Testimonial match at Oldham took place during 1960.

== Honoured in Oldham ==
Winslade Close in Oldham is named after Charles Winslade. In book "Watersheddings Memories" a picture of Charles' granddaughters Charlotte Howell (c. 2007 (age 18–19)) and Jaynee Winslade G. (c. 2010 (age 15–16)) can be seen, they are both stood on "Winslade Close" next to the street sign.
