= Alan Davies (rugby league) =

GB & England international rugby league footballer

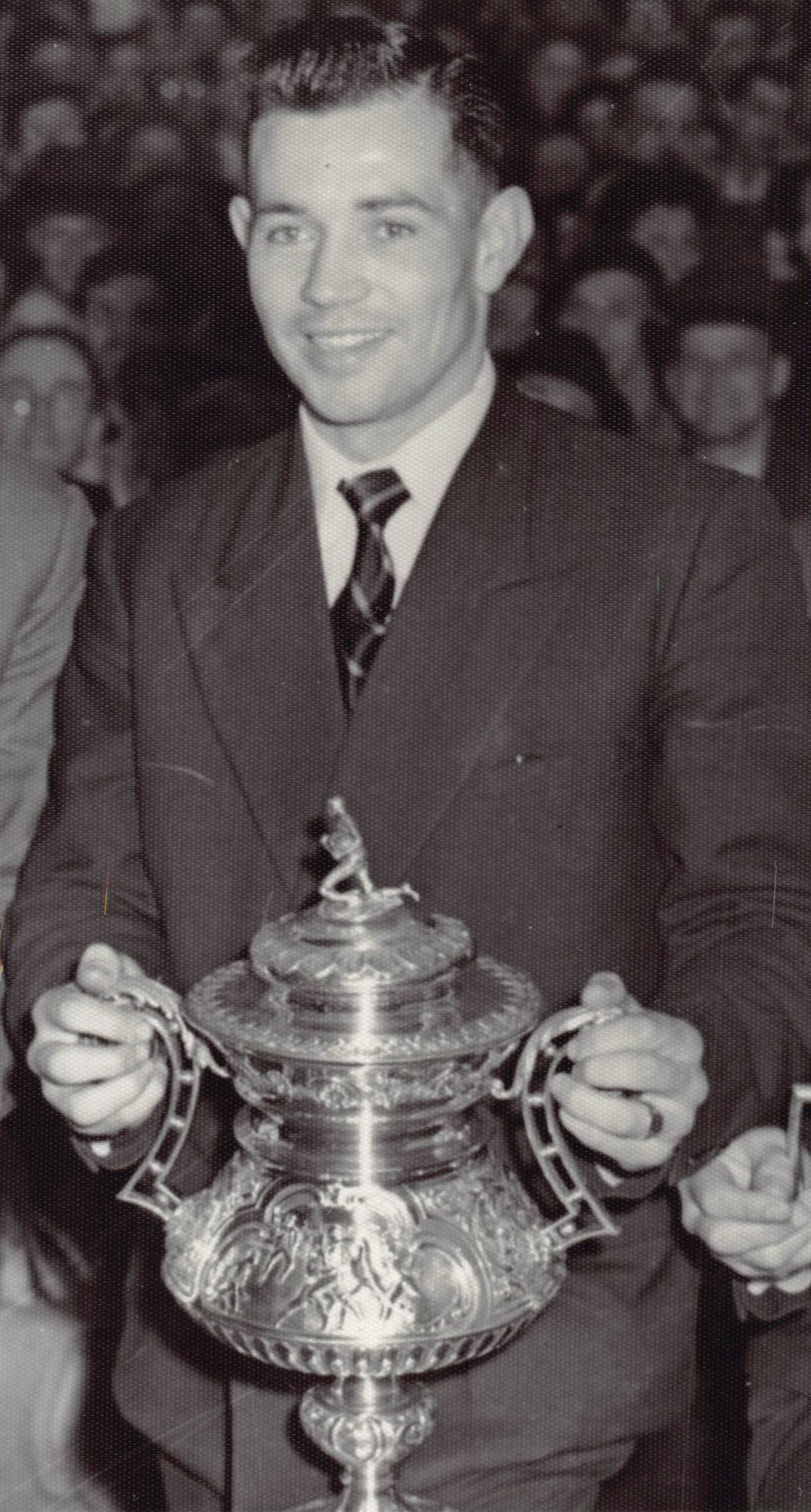
- Alan Davies holding the Lancashire Cup (1956-57 season)

Personal information
- Full name: Alan Davies
- Born: 4 February 1933 Leigh, England
- Died: 2 February 2009 (aged 75) Blackburn, England

Playing information
- Position: Wing, Centre, Stand-off
Club
| Years | Team | Pld | T | G | FG | P |
|---|---|---|---|---|---|---|
| 1950–61 | Oldham | 391 | 174 | 1 | 0 | 524 |
| 1961–65 | Wigan | 132 | 52 | 0 | 0 | 156 |
| 1965–66 | Wakefield Trinity | 9 | 0 | 0 | 0 | 0 |
| ≥1965–≥65 | Salford | 4 |
| | Total | 536 | 226 | 1 | 0 | 680 |
Representative
| Years | Team | Pld | T | G | FG | P |
| 1952–62 | Lancashire | 19 | 10 | 0 | 0 | 30 |
| 1953–56 | England | 2 | 3 | 0 | 0 | 9 |
| 1955–60 | Great Britain | 22 | 8 | 2 | 0 | 28 |

Alan Davies (4 February 1933 – 2 February 2009) was an English World Cup winning professional rugby league footballer who played in the 1950s and 1960s. He played at representative level for Great Britain and England, and at club level for Oldham, Wigan, Wakefield Trinity and Salford, as a centre, stand-off, or wing.

== Background ==
Davies was born in Leigh, Lancashire, England, and he died aged 76 from Chronic obstructive pulmonary disease (emphysema) in hospital in Blackburn, Lancashire, England.

== Playing career ==
Alan joined Oldham from Leigh amateur club Dootsons in July 1950 and made his senior debut on 9 September in the 35–8 victory over Wakefield, on the left-wing; however, it is at centre where he would make his mark, and where he would represent his country. During his career at Oldham the team would come second in league in the 1954-55 season (when he was captain), and then lose in the championship final 3–7 to Warrington. The team would top the league table in both the 1956-57 season and the 1957-58 season, winning the championship title in the play-off final of 1956-57, beating Hull FC at Odsal Stadium by 15 pts. to 14. Oldham would also win the Lancashire County Cup (see below) three times in 1955–56, 1956–57 and 1957–58, and be champions of the Lancashire League (see below) twice in 1956–57 and 1957–58. He would play for the Oldham club (Heritage no. 558) for 11 years, appearing in nearly 400 games and scoring 174 tries – more than any other player for the Oldham club. In 1961 he was the transferred to Wigan where he played in the 1963 Challenge Cup Final alongside another ex-Oldham teammate – Frank Pitchford.

=== Challenge Cup Final appearances ===
Alan Davies played at centre in Wigan's 10–25 defeat by Wakefield Trinity in the 1962–63 Challenge Cup Final during the 1962–63 season at Wembley Stadium, London on Saturday 11 May 1963, in front of a crowd of 84,492.

=== Lancashire County Cup Final appearances ===
Davies played in four Lancashire County Cup Finals for Oldham: firstly, he captained the side in their 2–12 loss to Barrow in the 1954 Lancashire Cup final at Station Road, Swinton on Saturday 23 October 1954; then played in their 10–3 victory over St. Helens in the 1956 Lancashire Cup final at Station Road, Swinton on Saturday 20 October 1956; then in their 13–8 victory over Wigan in the 1957 Lancashire Cup final at Station Road, Swinton on Saturday 19 October 1957 in which he played left centre, and scored a try; and finally, playing right-centre, and scoring another try in Oldham’s 12-2 victory over St. Helens in the 1958 Lancashire Cup final at Station Road, Swinton on Saturday 25 October 1958.

=== Lancashire County League champion ===
Alan Davies was playing for Oldham when they were Lancashire League Champions in 1956–57 and 1957–58, and playing for Wigan when they won the title in the 1961–62 season.

=== International honours ===
Alan Davies won caps for England while at Oldham in 1953 against Wales, in 1956 against France, and won caps for Great Britain while at Oldham in 1955 against New Zealand, in 1956 against Australia (3 matches), in the 1957 Rugby League World Cup against France, and Australia, in 1957 against France (2 matches), in 1958 against France, Australia (2 matches), and New Zealand (2 matches), in 1959 against France (2 matches), and Australia, in the 1960 Rugby League World Cup against New Zealand (1-try), France (two tries), and Australia, and in 1960 against France.

Alan Davies played at centre in all three matches for Great Britain's 1960 Rugby League World Cup winning team.

Alan Davies also represented Great Britain while at Oldham between 1952 and 1956 against France (2 non-Test matches).

In all, with 20 Great Britain caps, he is the most-highly capped player in Oldham R.L.F.C. history.

== Honoured at Oldham ==
Davies is an Oldham Hall of Fame Inductee.

== Personal life ==
Davies married his wife, Joyce, with whom he had four children; one son, Stephen, and three daughters, Linda, Sarah and Janice. After finishing his career in rugby, Alan became a Jehovah's Witness. Alan Davies was the son of the rugby league footballer who played in the 1920s and 1930s for Leigh; Harry "Cocky" Davies (named "Cocky" for his self-confidence), and the older brother of the rugby league footballer who played in the 1950s and 1960s for Leigh and Huddersfield; Gwyn Davies.
