= Don Vines =

GB & Wales international rugby league footballer

Personal information
- Full name: Donald George Vines
- Born: 6 February 1932 Newbridge (Newport district), Wales
- Died: 17 September 1989 (aged 57) Wakefield, England

Playing information

Rugby union
- Position: Centre, Forward
Club
Years	Team	Pld	T	G	FG	P
1953?–56	Newbridge RFC

Rugby league
- Position: Prop, Second-row, Loose forward
Club
Years	Team	Pld	T	G	FG	P
1956–58	Oldham	70	4	0	0	12
1958–60	Wakefield Trinity	71	4	0	0	12
1960–61	St. Helens	38	1	0	0	3
1961–65	Wakefield Trinity	114
	Total	293	9	0	0	27
Representative
Years	Team	Pld	T	G	FG	P
1965	Other Nationalities	1
1959–63	Wales	2
1959	Great Britain	3	1	0	0	3

Coaching information
Club
Years	Team	Gms	W	D	L	W%
1979–80	Doncaster RLFC

Donald "Don" George Vines (6 February 1932 – 17 September 1989) was a Welsh rugby union, and professional rugby league footballer who played in the 1950s and 1960s, and a heel wrestler in professional wrestling of the 1960s. He played club level rugby union (RU) for Newbridge RFC, as a centre, or later in the forwards, and representative level rugby league (RL) for Great Britain, Wales and Other Nationalities, and at club level for Oldham, Wakefield Trinity (two spells), and St Helens, as a prop, second-row, or loose forward.

== Background ==
Don Vines was born in Newbridge, Wales, his birth was registered in Newport district, he worked as a blacksmith at Crigglestone Colliery c. 1960, he worked at Wakefield College c. 1980s, and he died aged 57 in Wakefield, West Yorkshire, England.

== Playing career ==
=== International honours ===
Don Vines won caps for Wales (RL) while at Wakefield Trinity 1959...1963 2-caps, and won caps for Great Britain (RL) while at Wakefield Trinity in 1959 against France (2 matches), and Australia, and represented Other Nationalities (RL) while at Wakefield Trinity, he played at second-row in the 2–19 defeat by St. Helens at Knowsley Road, St. Helens on Wednesday 27 January 1965, to mark the switching-on of new floodlights.

=== Championship appearances ===
Don Vines played at prop in Wakefield Trinity's 3–27 defeat by Wigan in the Championship Final during the 1959–60 season at Odsal Stadium, Bradford on Saturday 21 May 1960.

=== Challenge Cup Final appearances ===
Don Vines played at prop in Wakefield Trinity's 38–5 victory over Hull F.C. in the 1959–60 Challenge Cup Final during the 1959–60 season at Wembley Stadium, London on Saturday 14 May 1960, in front of a crowd of 79,773, played at second-row in St. Helens' 12–6 victory over Wigan in the 1960–61 Challenge Cup Final during the 1960–61 season at Wembley Stadium, London on Saturday 13 May 1961, in front of a crowd of 94,672, and played at second-row in Wakefield Trinity's 25–10 victory over Wigan in the 1962–63 Challenge Cup Final during the 1962–63 season at Wembley Stadium, London on Saturday 11 May 1963, in front of a crowd of 84,492.

=== County Cup Final appearances ===
Don Vines played at prop in Oldham's 13–8 victory over Wigan in the 1957–58 Lancashire CupFinal during the 1957–58 season at Station Road, Swinton on Saturday 19 October 1957, played at second-row in St. Helens' 15–9 victory over Swinton in the 1960–61 Lancashire Cup Final during the 1960–61 season at Central Park, Wigan on Saturday 29 October 1960, played at second-row in Wakefield Trinity's 19–9 victory over Leeds in the 1961–62 Yorkshire Cup Final during the 1961–62 season at Odsal Stadium, Bradford on Saturday 11 November 1961, and played at prop in the 18–2 victory over Leeds in the 1964–65 Yorkshire Cup Final during the 1964–65 season at Fartown, Huddersfield on Saturday 31 October 1964.

=== Club career ===
Don Vines made his début for Wakefield Trinity in the 15–14 victory over Huddersfield at Fartown, Huddersfield on Saturday 27 September 1958.

== Contemporaneous article extract ==
"Don Vines. Playing as off-half for the Welsh Association of Boys' Clubs, then at centre for Welsh Youth against Welsh Secondary Schools, Don started his football career with two caps. That was in 1950. There followed three years in the Army and after that a period with the Newbridge R.U. club, still at centre threequarter. A brief break and then resumption with Newbridge, this time as a forward, but after three more months Don decided to change his code, and signed for Oldham Rugby League Club in 1956. Two years later came another move, this time, we are glad to say, to Trinity. Whilst with us he has gained international honours for Wales v. France, twice for Great Britain v. France, and again, during the recent tour of the Australians, for Great Britain v. Australia. Trinity followers are glad to know that Don is happily settled in Wakefield. We shall look forward to many more grand displays such as he has given since coming to Belle Vue."

Don went to Oxford with Les Gant in the 1970's to guest coach the newly formed Oxford University Rugby League Club. He was excellent and the team is still going strong forty years later.

== Genealogical information ==
Don Vines' marriage to Patricia B. (née Cook, birth registered during fourth quarter 1934 (age 91–92) in Newport district) was registered during second quarter 1954 in Caerleon district, Wales. They had children; Michelle Vines, Beverley S. Vines (birth registered during fourth quarter 1960 (age 65–66) in St. Helens district)and Lee J. Vines (birth registered during third aquarter 1962 (age 63–64) in Wakefield district).

== Television ==
Year	Title	Role	Notes
1980	Leave it to Charlie	Man at Wrestling Match	Episode: "The World of Mr. Wellbeloved"
