= Jimmy Cowan (rugby league) =

Scotland international rugby league footballer

James Cowan
Personal information
- Full name: James Cowan
- Born: 4 December 1975 (age 49)

Playing information
- Position: Wing
Club
Years	Team	Pld	T	G	FG	P
1995–96	Oldham	15	0	0	0	0
Representative
Years	Team	Pld	T	G	FG	P
1996	Scotland	1	0	0	0	0

James Cowan (born 4 December 1975) is a former professional rugby league footballer who played in the 1990s. He played at representative level for Scotland, and at club level for Oldham as a wing.

== International honours ==
Cowan won a cap for Scotland while at Oldham 1996 1-cap.
