= Derek Turner =

English rugby player and coach (1932–2015)

Personal information
- Born: 13 November 1932 Ossett, England
- Died: 31 July 2015 (aged 82) Wakefield, England

Playing information
- Height: 6 ft 0 in (1.83 m)
- Weight: 13 st 7 lb (86 kg)
- Position: Second-row, Loose forward
Club
Years	Team	Pld	T	G	FG	P
1950–55	Hull Kingston Rovers	141	27	0	0	81
1955–59	Oldham	134	35	1	0	107
1959–66	Wakefield Trinity	213	45	0	0	135
	Total	488	107	1	0	323
Representative
Years	Team	Pld	T	G	FG	P
1957	Great Britain & France	1	1			3
19??–??	Yorkshire	10	2	0	0	6
1962	England	1	0	0	0	0
1956–62	Great Britain	24	8	0	0	24

Coaching information
Club
Years	Team	Gms	W	D	L	W%
1968–69	Castleford
1969–72	Leeds
1983–84	Wakefield Trinity
	Total	0	0	0	0

Derek Turner (13 November 1932 – 31 July 2015), also known by the nickname of "Rocky", was an English World Cup winning professional rugby league footballer who played in the 1940s, 1950s and 1960s, and coached in the 1960s, 1970s and 1980s. He played at representative level for Great Britain, England, Yorkshire and Great Britain & France, and at club level for Hull Kingston Rovers, Oldham and Wakefield Trinity (captain), with whom he won three Challenge Cup Finals, as a second-row, or more usually loose forward, and coached at club level for Castleford, Leeds and Wakefield Trinity.

== Club career ==
Turner played his early rugby league at Cathedral Boys School, Wakefield, then Alverthorpe Youth Club, Balne Lane ARLFC, Ossett ARLFC, and Shaw Cross ARLFC, he began his professional rugby league career at Hull Kingston Rovers. In 1955, Turner was transferred from Hull Kingston Rovers to Oldham for £2,750 (based on increases in average earnings, this would be approximately £165,900 in 2016).

Turner made his début for Oldham against Hunslet on 3 September 1955. He was a member of the Oldham team that found success in the Championship of 1956–57, the Lancashire Cup Finals of 1956–57, 1957–58 & 1958–59, and the Lancashire League of 1956–57 & 1957–58. Whilst at Oldham, Turner won 11 of his 24 Great Britain caps, winning the Ashes in 1956. In March 1959, Turner was transferred from Oldham to Wakefield Trinity for £8,000 (based on increases in average earnings, this would be approximately £391,700 in 2016).

At Wakefield Trinity Turner captained Wakefield Trinity in three Challenge Cup victories (1960, 1962 and 1963), played loose forward in the 38–5 victory over Hull F.C. in the 1959–60 Challenge Cup Final during the 1959–60 season at Wembley Stadium, London on Saturday 14 May 1960, in front of a crowd of 79,773 presented by HM the Queen, played loose forward in the 12–6 victory over Huddersfield in the 1961–62 Challenge Cup Final during the 1961–62 season at Wembley Stadium, London on Saturday 12 May 1962, in front of a crowd of 81,263, presented by Field Marshal Montgomery, and played at second-row in the 25–10 victory over Wigan in the 1962–63 Challenge Cup Final during the 1962–63 season at Wembley Stadium, London on Saturday 11 May 1963, in front of a crowd of 84,492, presented by Field Marshal Alexander.

Turner played loose forward in Wakefield Trinity's 16–10 victory over Huddersfield in the 1960–61 Yorkshire Cup Final during the 1960–61 season at Headingley, Leeds on Saturday 29 October 1960, and played loose forward in the 19–9 victory over Leeds in the 1961–62 Yorkshire Cup Final during the 1961–62 season at Odsal, Bradford on Saturday 11 November 1961. Turner also captained Wakefield Trinity to victory in the Yorkshire League during the 1958–59 season, 1959–60 season, 1961–62 season and 1962–63 season.

Whilst at Wakefield Trinity, Turner won the remaining 13 of his 24 Great Britain caps, winning the World Cup in 1960 and the Ashes in 1959 & 1962, he also won his sole England cap.

Turner retired in 1964 but returned to play a further 24 matches for Trinity in the 1965–66 season before an injury in the first match of the 1966–67 season brought his playing career to an end.

== Representative career ==
Throughout the 1950s and 1960s, Turner played for Yorkshire against Lancashire in ten Rugby League War of the Roses matches, scoring two tries.

Alongside fellow Oldham player, centre Alan Davies, Turner was selected for the Great Britain squad to play in Australia's 1956 Kangaroo Tour of Great Britain, Turner was rested for the first Test which Great Britain won 21–10 at Central Park, Wigan. Turner played in the second match which Australia won 9–22 at Odsal, Bradford. Turner played in the third Test as Great Britain defeated Australia 19–0 at Station Road, Swinton, to take the Ashes series 2–1.

Just prior to the 1957 World Cup, Turner played in all three of Great Britain's matches against France, alternating between venues in Great Britain and France. Great Britain won two and drew one of the fixtures: 45–12 Headingley, Leeds; 19–19 Stade Municipal, Toulouse; 29–14 Knowsley Road, St. Helens.

Alongside fellow Oldham players, centre Alan Davies, and second-row Sid Little, Turner was selected for the Great Britain squad to play in the 1957 Rugby League World Cup in Australia. Turner played in the 23–5 victory over France at Sydney Cricket Ground, Sydney, the 6–31 defeat by Australia at Sydney Cricket Ground, Sydney, and the 29–21 defeat by New Zealand at Sydney Cricket Ground, Sydney. Australia ran out comfortable World Champions, with victories over New Zealand, Great Britain and France. Despite suffering a heavier defeat by Australia than either New Zealand or France, Great Britain's heavy victory over France in the opening match, France's narrow victory over New Zealand, and Great Britain's narrow defeat by New Zealand in the last match secured Great Britain second place overall. Great Britain had the luxury of playing all their matches at Sydney Cricket Ground, Sydney, whereas New Zealand and France had to play at both the Gabba, Brisbane, and Sydney Cricket Ground, Sydney, which are 575-miles apart.

Turner played loose forward and scored a try in Great Britain & France's 37–31 victory over New Zealand at Carlaw Park, Auckland on 3 July 1957.

Just after to the 1957 World Cup, Turner played in both of Great Britain's matches against France, alternating between venues in Great Britain and France. Great Britain won both tests; 14–25 at Stade Municipal, Toulouse; 44–15 at Central Park, Wigan.

In 1958, Turner played for Great Britain in the 23–9 defeat by France at Stade Lesdiguières, Grenoble.

Alongside fellow Oldham players, centre Alan Davies, and scrum-half Frank Pitchford, Turner was selected for the Great Britain squad to play in 1958 tour of Australia, but had to withdraw because of an injury.

Turner was selected for the Great Britain squad to play in Australia's 1959 Kangaroo Tour of Great Britain, Turner played in first of the three matches. Australia won the first Test 22–14 at Station Road, Swinton. Turner was rested for the second and third of the three matches, Great Britain won the second 11–10 at Headingley, Leeds. Great Britain won the third 18–12 at Central Park, Wigan to take the Ashes series 2–1.

Just prior to the 1960 World Cup, Turner played in all three of Great Britain's matches against France, alternating between venues in France and Great Britain. Great Britain won one, drew one and lost one of the fixtures: France won 20–18 at Stade Municipal, Toulouse. On 65 minutes a colossal brawl erupted when Georges Fages kicked Turner on the chin following Turner's tackle on Fages. When the dust settled Turner was ordered off, but five minutes elapsed before he was finally escorted from the field by Bill Fallowfield, secretary of the Rugby Football League. The British players waited for Fages to go, but in vain. There was 17–17 draw at Knowsley Road, St Helens; Great Britain won 21–10 at Stade André Moga, Bordeaux.

Alongside fellow Wakefield Trinity player prop Jack Wilkinson, Turner was selected for the Great Britain squad to play in the 1960 Rugby League World Cup in Great Britain. Turner played in the 23–8 victory over New Zealand at Odsal, Bradford, rested on Saturday 1 October 1960 for the 33–7 victory over France at Station Road, Swinton, Turner returned for the last match of the series against Australia at Odsal, Bradford. The 1960 Rugby League World Cup was run on a league basis, but with both Great Britain and Australia undefeated, the last match became a virtual World Cup Final. Great Britain become World Champions with the 10–3 victory over Australia at Odsal, Bradford.

In 1961, Turner played for Great Britain in the 27–8 victory over France at Knowsley Road, St. Helens. Unusually, Turner played as a second-row, with Vince Karalius playing loose forward.

Turner was selected for the Great Britain squad to play in New Zealand's 1961 Tour of Great Britain, Turner played in the first of the three matches, the 11–29 defeat by New Zealand at Headingley, Leeds.

In 1962 Turner played his sole England international against France, an 18–6 victory at Headingley, Leeds. This was also England's sole international between 10 May 1956 and 7 November 1968. Great Britain being the primary incarnation of international representation during this period, a period that matched Turner's prominence.

Alongside fellow Wakefield Trinity players, Neil Fox, Harold Poynton, Gerry Round, and Jack Wilkinson, Turner was selected for the Great Britain squad to play in 1962 tour of Australia, New Zealand and South Africa. This Great Britain team would be the nearest to achieving a 3–0 Ashes whitewash of the Kangaroos on Australian turf to date.

In Australia, Turner scored a try in the 31–12 victory in the first Test at Sydney Cricket Ground, Sydney (before more than 70,000 fans), was rested for the 17–10 victory in the second Test in the Gabba, Brisbane (attendance 34,786), and returned for the third Test at the Sydney Cricket Ground, Sydney. In the third Test of the 1962 Ashes series, Australia's Dud Beattie suffered a broken collarbone, and knowing he would have to leave the field anyway (Substitutions not being permitted until 1964), Beattie ignited a fight with Turner, it resulted in the referee sending both players from the field. As Beattie was being half-carried from the arena by an ambulance man, Turner prodded and remonstrated with Beattie for his actions. A controversial last-minute Ken Irvine try against the weakened defence, Mick Sullivan having already been sent off, and the subsequent touchline goal resulted in a 17–18 defeat, although a whitewash was denied, Great Britain won the Ashes series 2–1.

After the Australia Ashes Tests, With Eric Ashton (Captain), Alex Murphy and Don Fox injured, Turner took over the captaincy for the two tests in New Zealand. However, these and other injuries depleted the squad to such an extent that both tests in Carlaw Park, Auckland were lost 0–19 and 8–27.

After the New Zealand Tests, only fourteen players from the original squad of twenty-five were uninjured, thirteen of whom went on to play three exhibition matches in South Africa. Despite being top try scorer, with 22 tries in the tests, Billy Boston could not be considered for selection purely due to the colour of his skin, as this was apartheid-era South Africa. Consequently, coach Colin Hutton became a stand-in reserve. The squad for the South African exhibition matches was; Eric Fraser (Warrington); Ike Southward (Workington Town), Peter Small (Castleford), Neil Fox (Wakefield Trinity), Mick Sullivan (St. Helens); Dave Bolton (Wigan), Harold Poynton (Wakefield Trinity); Jack Wilkinson (Wakefield Trinity), John Shaw (Halifax), Ken Noble (Huddersfield), Laurie Gilfedder (Warrington), Dick Huddart (St. Helens), Derek Turner (Wakefield Trinity); Reserve: Colin Hutton (Hull Kingston Rovers).

In 1962, Turner played his last match for Great Britain in the 17–12 defeat by France at Stade Gilbert Brutus, Perpignan.

== Coaching career ==
After retiring from the field Turner was head coach for Castleford at Wheldon Road from 1966 until Saturday 24 May 1969, and is regarded as the best Castleford coach of all time. During his period as coach Castleford won the Challenge Cup in 1969 as well as reaching the Yorkshire Cup Final and Premiership Final.

Leaving Castleford Turner became coach at Leeds between 1969 and 1972. He coached Leeds to victory in the Championship Final in 1972.

Derek Turner was the coach in Leeds' 7–24 defeat by Leigh in the 1970–71 Challenge Cup Final during the 1970–71 season at Wembley Stadium, London on Saturday 15 May 1971, in front of a crowd of 85,514, and was the coach in the 13–16 defeat by St. Helens in the 1971–72 Challenge Cup Final during the 1971–72 season at Wembley Stadium, London on Saturday 13 May 1972, in front of a crowd of 89,495

Turner was Head Coach for Wakefield Trinity at Belle Vue from July 1983 until February 1984.

== Outside rugby league ==
Turner appeared in the 1963 film This Sporting Life. The film's director, Lindsay Anderson, instructed Turner to make a scene where the main character Frank Machin loses seven teeth, following a scrum, look realistic. Richard Harris who was playing Frank Machin was knocked out, and filming for the day was abandoned.

For a number of years, Turner and his son Darren ran a removals business, Derek Turner Ltd, based in Ossett near Wakefield.

== Peer accolades ==
In 2003, BBC Rugby League commentator Ray French was asked to name the six 'hardest' men ever to play Rugby League, he named Turner along with; Vince Karalius, Barrie McDermott, Ray Price, Gorden Tallis & Cliff Watson.

According to Lion Phil Jackson "Vince Karalius was much lauded here as one of the best loose forwards to go (to Australia) and I reckon Derek Turner were [sic] a better player".

== Death and legacy ==
Turner died on 31 July 2015, aged 82. In 2018, he was posthumously inducted into the Rugby League Hall of Fame.
