= 1956–57 Northern Rugby Football League season =

1956–57 Rugby Football League season
- League: Northern Rugby Football League
- Champions: Oldham
- League Leaders: Oldham
- Top point-scorer(s): Lewis Jones 496
- Top try-scorer(s): Billy Boston 60

The 1956–57 Rugby Football League season was the 62nd season of rugby league football.

== Season summary ==
Oldham finished the regular season as the league leaders and then won their fourth Rugby Football League Championship when they beat Hull F.C. 15-14 in the play-off final.

The Challenge Cup winners were Leeds who beat Barrow 9-7 in the final.

Oldham won the Lancashire League, and Leeds won the Yorkshire League. Oldham beat St. Helens 10–3 to win the Lancashire County Cup, and Wakefield Trinity beat Hunslet 23–5 to win the Yorkshire County Cup.

Lewis Jones' record total of 496 points was only bettered in 2024 by Max Jowitt, who scored 500 in Wakefield Trinity's successful Championship campaign.

== Championship ==
	Team	Pld	W	D	L	Pts
1	Oldham	38	33	0	5	66
2	Hull	38	29	2	7	60
3	Barrow	38	29	0	9	58
4	Leeds	38	28	0	10	56
5	St. Helens	38	25	3	10	53
6	Wigan	38	26	0	12	52
7	Hunslet	38	26	0	12	52
8	Wakefield Trinity	38	23	1	14	47
9	Huddersfield	38	23	0	15	46
10	Warrington	38	21	1	16	43
11	York	38	21	0	17	42
12	Halifax	38	21	0	17	42
13	Salford	38	19	2	17	40
14	Workington Town	38	20	0	18	40
15	Featherstone Rovers	38	19	0	19	38
16	Rochdale Hornets	38	19	0	19	38
17	Leigh	38	18	1	19	37
18	Whitehaven	38	18	1	19	37
19	Swinton	38	18	0	20	36
20	Keighley	38	17	1	20	35
21	Bradford Northern	38	17	0	21	34
22	Bramley	38	14	2	22	30
23	Widnes	38	15	0	23	30
24	Blackpool Borough	38	14	0	24	28
25	Castleford	38	11	2	25	24
26	Hull Kingston Rovers	38	11	2	25	24
27	Liverpool City	38	9	1	28	19
28	Batley	38	8	0	30	16
29	Dewsbury	38	5	1	32	11
30	Doncaster	38	3	0	35	6

Play-offs

=== Play-offs ===
Semi-finals
1	Oldham	22
4	Leeds	12
2	Barrow	14
3	Hull	45

Championship final
Oldham	15
Hull	14

==== Final ====
18 May 1957

Oldham	15 – 14	Hull
Tries: Etty (2), Ayres; Goals: Ganley (3)		Tries: Cowan, Turner; Goals: Hutton (4)

Odsal Stadium, Bradford
Attendance: 62,233
Referee: M. Coates (Pudsey)

Oldham	Number	Hull
	Teams	
Bernard Ganley	1	Colin Hutton
Dick Cracknell	2	Stan Cowan
Alan Davies	3	Geoff Dannatt
Dennis Ayres	4	Carl Turner
John Etty	5	Ivor Watts
Frank Daley	6	Rowley Moat
Frank Pitchford	7	Tommy Finn
Ken Jackson	8	Mick Scott
Jack Keith	9	Tommy Harris
Don Vines	10	Jim Drake
Charlie Winslade	11	Cyril Sykes
Sid Little	12	Bill Drake
Derek Turner	13	Johnny Whiteley
	Coach	Roy Francis

== Challenge Cup ==
Leeds beat Barrow 9-7 in the Challenge Cup Final played at Wembley Stadium before a crowd of 76,318.

This was Leeds’ eighth Challenge Cup Final win in ten Final appearances. Jeff Stevenson, their scrum half back, was awarded the Lance Todd Trophy for his man-of-the-match performance.

== Kangaroo Tour ==
October until December also saw the appearance of the Australian team in England on their 1956–57 Kangaroo Tour. Other than the three test Ashes series against Great Britain (won 2–1 by Australia), The Kangaroos played 16 matches against club and county representative sides.

The Kangaroos were captain-coached by St George Dragons hooker Ken Kearney.

game	Date	Result	Venue	Attendance
1	10 October	Australia def. Liverpool City 40–12	Knotty Ash Stadium, Liverpool	4,712
2	13 October	Leeds def. Australia 18–13	Headingley, Leeds	24,459
3	15 October	Australia def. Hull F.C. / Hull KR XIII 37–14	The Boulevard, Hull	17,172
4	18 October	Australia def. Barrow 25–11	Craven Park, Barrow-in-Furness	9,988
5	20 October	Whitehaven def. Australia 14–11	Recreation Ground, Whitehaven	10,840
6	24 October	Australia def. Bradford Northern 23–11	Odsal Stadium, Bradford	2,743
7	27 October	Warrington def. Australia 21–17	Wilderspool Stadium, Warrington	15,613
8	29 October	Australia def. English League XIII 19–15	Hilton Park, Leigh	7,811
9	3 November	Australia def. York 20–18	Clarence Street, York	6,842
10	7 November	Oldham def. Australia 15–2	The Watersheddings, Oldham	8,458
11	10 November	Australia def. Huddersfield 20–10	Fartown Ground, Huddersfield	12,127
12	17 November	Great Britain def. Australia 21–10	Central Park, Wigan	22,473
13	21 November	Australia def. Hunslet 27–11	Parkside, Hunslet	4,451
14	24 November	St Helens def. Australia 44–2	Knowsley Road, St Helens	15,579
15	1 December	Australia def. Great Britain 22–9	Odsal Stadium, Bradford	23,634
16	5 December	Halifax def. Australia 6–3	Thrum Hall, Halifax	2,254
17	8 December	Australia def. Wigan 32–4	Central Park, Wigan	15,854
18	10 December	Wakefield Trinity def. Australia 17–12	Belle Vue, Wakefield	3,381
19	15 December	Great Britain def. Australia 19–0	Station Road, Swinton	17,542

== Sources ==
- 1956-57 Rugby Football League season at Wigan.rlfans.com
- The Challenge Cup at The Rugby Football League website
