= Matt Munro (rugby league) =

Australian rugby league footballer and coach

Personal information
- Full name: Matt Munro
- Born: 5 February 1971 (age 54); Sydney, New South Wales, Australia

Playing information
- Position: Lock
Club
Years	Team	Pld	T	G	FG	P
1990–91	Parramatta Eels	8	0	0	0	0
1992–95	Balmain Tigers	60	5	0	0	20
1996–97	Oldham Bears	37	8	0	0	32
1998	South Sydney	17	0	0	0	0
	Total	122	13	0	0	52

Coaching information
Club
Years	Team	Gms	W	D	L	W%
1997	Oldham Bears
- Source: As of 18 December 2018

Matt Munro (born 5 February 1971) is an Australian former professional rugby league footballer who played in the 1990s, and has coached in the 1990s. He played at club level in the New South Wales Rugby League premiership (1990–1994), Australian Rugby League (1995), and National Rugby League (1998) for the Parramatta Eels, the Balmain Tigers and the South Sydney Rabbitohs, and in 1997's Super League II for the Oldham Bears, as a lock, and has coached at club level in 1997's Super League II for the Oldham Bears.

== Playing career ==
Munro began his first grade career with the Parramatta Eels in Round 8 of the 1990 season against the Illawarra Steelers in a 16–12 victory. Munro then switched to Balmain Tigers in 1992 and played with the club until the end of 1995 during which time the club was re-branded as the Sydney Tigers for one season and played out of the Parramatta Stadium at the start of the Super League war. In 1998, Munro transferred to the South Sydney Rabbitohs and played one season with the club before retiring.
