= Oldham R.L.F.C. =

English professional rugby league club

Club information
- Full name: Oldham Rugby League Football Club
- Nickname(s): Roughyeds , The Yeds
- Short name: Oldham
- Colours: Red, white and navy blue
- Founded: 1876; 150 years ago (as Oldham FC)
- Exited: 1997; 29 years ago
- Readmitted: 1998; 28 years ago (as Oldham RLFC)
- Website: roughyeds.co.uk

details
- Ground: Boundary Park
- CEO: David Bottomley
- Chairman: Terry Flanagan
- Coach: Alan Kilshaw
- Captain: Matty Wildie
- Competition: Championship
- 2026 season: 3rd (Semi Finals)
- Current season

Uniforms
Home colours

Records
- Champions: 4 (1905, 1910, 1911, 1957)
- Challenge Cups: 3 (1899, 1925, 1927)
- Lancashire County Cup: 9 (1906–07, 1909–10, 1912–13, 1918–19, 1923–24, 1932–33, 1955–56, 1956–57, 1957–58)
- Lancashire League: 7 (1897–98, 1900–01, 1907–08, 1909–10, 1921–22, 1956–57, 1957–58)
- Second Division: 3 (1963–64, 1981–82, 1987–88)
- Most capped: 627 – Joe Ferguson
- Highest points scorer: 2,761 – Bernard Ganley

Oldham Rugby League Football Club is a professional rugby league football club based in Oldham, Greater Manchester, England. The club plays home games at Boundary Park and compete in the Championship, the second tier of British rugby league.

Oldham have won the League Championship four times, Challenge Cup three times and the Second Division three times.

The clubs traditional home kits are red and white hooped jerseys, navy blue shorts and red socks. They share a local rivalry with Rochdale Hornets, Salford Red Devils and Swinton Lions and cross county rivalries with nearby Huddersfield Giants and Halifax.

== History ==
=== Early years ===
In 1876, Oldham Football Club was founded in a meeting at the Prince Albert Hotel, Union Street West, attended by Chairman of the Watch Committee, William Chadwick, Chief Constable Charles Hodgkinson, mill owner Fred Wild, eminent local Quaker and Lord to be Alfred Emmott and three brothers of the Fletcher family.

A playing field was organised at Sugar Meadow, Gartside Street adjacent to Glodwick Spinning Mill and changing facilities were provided by the nearby Shakespeare Inn. The club's headquarters were at the Black Swan Hotel, Bottom O'th Moor, Mumps. Their first match at Sugar Meadow was held on 21 October 1876 against Stalybridge. After two seasons they joined Oldham Cricket Club at the new Clarksfield ground before finding a more permanent home in 1889 at Watersheddings.

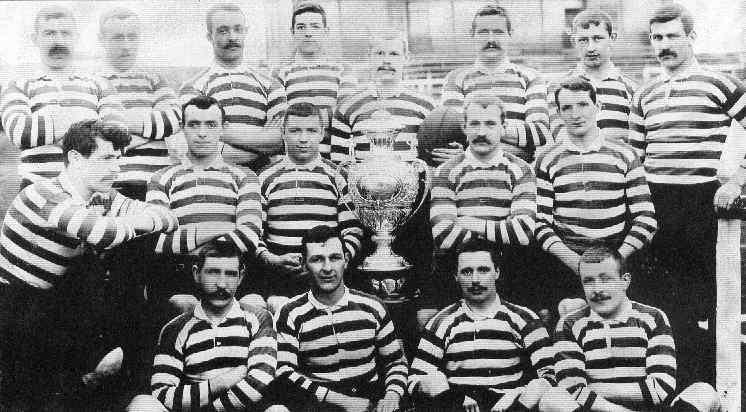
The Oldham team that won the Northern RFU championship in 1898

Oldham were one of the twenty-one clubs that left the Rugby Football Union to form the Northern Union in 1895. Oldham were fourth in the first title race of 1895–96 and second a year later. They were the second club to win the Challenge Cup after beating Hunslet 19–9 in 1899. Batley had won the first two finals.

Oldham finally won their first Championship title in 1904–05, just edging out Bradford Northern by three points. Oldham won the Lancashire League in 1897–98, 1900–01 and 1907–08 as well as the Lancashire County Cup in 1906–07. In the 1907–08 season, Oldham finished as league leaders but Hunslet were crowned champions in their historic all-four cups season after winning the Championship Final 12–2 in a replay after an initial 7–7 draw.

Another title success followed in 1909–10 as they beat Wigan in the Championship final. Also in that same season they managed to win the Lancashire League and Lancashire Cup. The following season, 1910–11, they beat Wigan again in the Championship final.

Oldham's record attendance was set in 1912 when the visit of Huddersfield for a league match drew 28,000 spectators.

Oldham won the Lancashire League in 1921–22 and the Lancashire Cup in 1912–13, 1918–19 and 1923–24. The annual Law Cup was first contested against neighbours Rochdale Hornets on 7 May 1921. Having lost in the 1907, 1912 and 1924 Challenge Cup Finals, they finally won the trophy again in 1925 when they beat Hull Kingston Rovers 16–3 at Headingley, Leeds.

They beat the visiting Australasian team of the 1921–22 Kangaroo tour of Great Britain 15–5.

The club's last Challenge Cup final was in 1927 when they beat Swinton 26–7 at Central Park, Wigan, their fourth consecutive final and revenge for their 9–3 defeat when the same teams met in the previous year's match. In 1932–33, Oldham won the Lancashire Cup again.

=== Post-war ===
In the 1950s, Oldham won the Championship and other trophies with a side that included Alan Davies, John Etty, goalkicker Bernard Ganley, Jack Keith, Sid Little, Frank Pitchford, Derek 'Rocky' Turner, Don Vines and Charlie Winslade.

On Monday 15 September 1952, record receipts were taken from a gate of 19,370 at Watersheddings to watch Oldham take on the Kangaroo tourists. The Australians lost only one of twenty-two club matches in Britain during that tour, but came close to defeat at Oldham, where the Roughyeds held them to a 7–7 draw.

Oldham played in the 1954–55 Championship Final at Maine Road, Manchester against Warrington. They also lost the Lancashire Cup final in a 2–12 defeat by Barrow in 1954.

Oldham's success in the 1950s also included a Championship title – in 1956–57; the Lancashire League 1956–57 and 1957–58 and the Lancashire Cup 1955–56, 1956–57 and 1957–58. Oldham lost 16–13 to Wigan in the 1966 Lancashire Cup Final. In 1964, Oldham reached the semi-finals of the Challenge Cup against Hull Kingston Rovers, the tie is remembered for taking three games to find the winner, the first match at Headingley finished 5–5, the replay at Station Road, Swinton finished prematurely 17–14 in Oldham's favour when the game was abandoned midway through the second half due to bad light, and the third game was won by Hull Kingston Rovers 12–2 at Fartown, Huddersfield.

Oldham were Division Two champions in 1963–64.

At the end of a disastrous 1969–70 season, when Oldham finished 29th out of 30 clubs in a single division, the committee was voted out of office en bloc and replaced by nine new officials and a new chairman in Arthur Walker. They brought in Graham Starkey as player-coach.

Dave Cox coached Oldham for 18 months until December 1978.

In the 1983–84 season, Oldham lost just two of their opening 11 Division One fixtures but collapsed around Christmas. After four defeats in five games, January's home game against Leigh descended into a mass brawl before the referee abandoned the match. Both clubs were fined £1,000 and coach Peter Smethurst decided to quit. The club committee asked his assistant, Frank Barrow to step into the breach. His first game was against rock-bottom Whitehaven, winless after 22 matches. But the Cumbrians ran in seven tries, handing Oldham a 42–8 mauling, and prompting Barrow to resign minutes after the game. He was replaced on a temporary basis by Brian Gartland.

Oldham pleaded with the local council for a financial bail-out in April 1987. Oldham decided to float as a public limited company and sold their training ground to the council in May 1987. Oldham won the 1988 Division Two title and the Division Two Premiership but lost £135,000. They would win the Premiership again in 1989–90.

Peter Tunks took over a coaching role with Oldham. Tunk's brief was clear: He had to sell most of his first team squad that had been relegated twice in 3 years, help to pay a tax bill of over 1 million pounds and sign promising players from the junior ranks. He narrowly missed promotion in the first year and took the team to the grand final where they were narrowly beaten. Over the next 2 years he got promotion to the top level for all the Oldham teams whilst getting young players like Chris Joynt, Barrie McDermott, David Bradbury, Gary Christie and Tommy Martyn to international level but due to the clubs massive debts run up by the previous management, Tunks was forced to sell his best players. Bob Lindner took over as captain-coach. The club sold the dilapidated Watersheddings in June 1994 for £1.25m to pay-off debts and moved to Oldham Athletic's Boundary Park stadium on the nearby Chadderton/Royton boundary.

Oldham Bears club logo

When a Rupert Murdoch funded Super League competition was proposed, part of the deal was that some traditional clubs would merge. Oldham were supposed to merge with Salford to form a club to be known as Manchester which would compete in the Super League. When Salford visited Oldham for a match on Good Friday, 14 April, supporters of both clubs demonstrated against the unpopular idea by invading the pitch during the interval. This merger was resisted and instead they adopted the name Oldham Bears and were founder members of the new league.

Relegation came in the second year of the new summer season, 1997, when they finished below Paris Saint-Germain. At campaign's end, an attempt was made by chairman Jim Quinn to sell the team for an undisclosed price tag, with debts reportedly between £500,000 and £1,000,000. Instead, the club went bankrupt soon after, with its actual liabilities pegged at £2,000,000. A new team Oldham Roughyeds was then formed in December to play at a lower level. The new club was created by Chris Hamilton and a band of three directors. The Roughyeds tag had been a long accepted nickname for the old club. It is however generally accepted that the new club (Oldham Roughyeds) is a legal continuation of the old club formed in 1876.

=== The Millennium ===
Mike Ford retired as player-coach of Oldham in 2001 and in January the following year took up a post as defensive co-ordinator with the Irish Rugby Football Union. Oldham put Mark Knight in temporary charge of the first team. After a successful 2001 season, they narrowly missed out on promotion to the Super League, losing to Widnes 12–24 in the Northern Ford Premiership Grand Final.

During the 2002 season they played at Ashton United's Hurst Cross ground in Ashton-under-Lyne, due to a dispute with Oldham Athletic over the use of Boundary Park.

Steve Molloy took charge of the Roughyeds after former boss John Harbin left to join Oldham Athletic as fitness conditioner and sports psychologist in July 2002. Under Molloy, Oldham won seven and drew two of their last 14 games. In doing so Oldham finished high enough to gain entry into National League One when the Northern Ford Premiership was split into two. In the first season of National League One, 2003, Oldham reached the last four of the play-offs. Although they still made the play-offs for the next couple of seasons trouble was waiting in the wings. Those troubles surfaced in March 2005, Oldham entered a creditors' voluntary agreement (CVA) with total debts of £325,000.

John Pendlebury resigned after three games as coach in March 2006 and was replaced by Steve Deakin, with very little money to spend and a poor squad the team finished the 2006 season with only one league win and were relegated to National League Two, the season ended on a high note though because the club paid its final payment of the CVA and would start the next season debt free. The Roughyeds also announced that they would stay at Boundary Park for the 2007 season after reaching agreement on a sliding scale rent.

=== 2007 – new ownership ===
In 2007, a few games into the new season, the excavation and demolition firm, the William Quinn Group, acquired a 52% stake in the club. That stake was later increased to 75%. Bill Quinn became the club's new chairman, with previous owners Chris Hamilton and Sean Whitehead remaining as directors.

On Friday 4 May 2007, Oldham took part in the first ever National League Two match broadcast live on British television, on Sky Sports. They won 34–26 away to the Crusaders in Bridgend, having trailed by 20 points after 45 minutes. The match was considered a warm-up for the Millennium Magic weekend in Cardiff the following day and, due to fans of Super League teams attending, attracted National League Two's highest ever attendance of 3,441.

That National League Two attendance record was broken in the return fixture on Thursday, 30 August 2007 between Oldham and Crusaders, again in front of the Sky Sports cameras, when 4,327 fans turned up at Boundary Park beating the old record by 886. it was also Oldham's largest attendance since the early 1990s. The event also raised around £8,000 for local charities and the rugby league players' benevolent fund.

Oldham finished their most successful season in recent years in 4th place on the National League Two table, they then played and won games against Swinton at home then Barrow away in the play-off to reach the National League Two Grand Final, but the game seemed a step too far for Oldham going down to an inspired Featherstone Rovers team at Headingley.

=== 2008 season summary ===
Northern Rail Cup – Oldham enjoyed reasonable success in the Northern Rail Cup, achieving a win over National League One favourites, Salford at Boundary Park to enable them to make it through the group stage of the competition into the knockout stages where they faced and beat another National League One team in Whitehaven to progress to the quarter finals against Batley at Mount Pleasant, in a see-saw battle Oldham's challenge died thanks to a dubious referee call followed up by a quick fire Batley try.

Challenge Cup – Oldham were the last non-Super League club to be knocked out of the 2008 Challenge Cup, going as far as the quarter finals before being beaten by Wakefield Trinity at Belle Vue.

National League Two – Despite winning more games and losing less games than Barrow but only winning 1 bonus point (to Barrow's 5 points) all season Oldham finished 3rd in National League Two on points difference behind Barrow who came 2nd and Gateshead who won the league, Oldham would again have to face the route of the play-offs and like the previous year Oldham again reached the National League Two Grand Final, this time against Doncaster and like 2007 Oldham again lost to miss out on promotion to National League One losing 18–10 at Warrington's Halliwell Jones Stadium, as a result of not gaining promotion to National League One coach Steve Deakin did not have his contract renewed.

=== 2009 season summary ===
Tony Benson became head coach of Oldham.

2009 Championship 1 – Oldham finished fourth in the 2009 Co-operative Championship One table with a record of 10–1–7. The Roughyeds won 31–26 at home to Swinton in the first round of the play-offs before winning 54–30 at home to Hunslet Hawks. That set up a final eliminator against York City Knights, who finished third in the table, and the Roughyeds upset the hosts by winning 44–14 to reach the Grand Final again. But Oldham were beaten in the Grand Final for a third straight year, losing 28–26 to Keighley, who finished second in the table.

Roughyeds were told they would no longer be able to use Oldham Athletic's Boundary Park in November 2009. The club went to Oldham Council for help. Oldham Council bought Whitebank Stadium from Oldham Boro F.C. and then entered into a lease agreement with Oldham Roughyeds RLFC.

The 2010 season saw a transition with the five home games were played out of town at Sedgley Park R.U.F.C.'s Park Lane ground in Whitefield. Roughyeds' first game at Whitebank took place on 9 May 2010 with the opposition being York. This was the first time that Oldham had played in a ground within Oldham borough since 1997. Home crowds are nearly double at Whitebank compared to Park Lane.

=== 2010s ===
Oldham suffered relegation to League 1 at the end of the 2017 Championship season. In 2019, they earned promotion back to the Championship after defeating Newcastle in the League 1 play off final.

=== 2020s ===
In the 2021 Championship season, Oldham finished second from bottom of the table and were relegated back to League 1 having won only two matches. Their top points scorer was Martyn Ridyard with 96 points scored.

In the 2022 League 1 season, Oldham finished sixth with a record of 8 wins, 1 draw, 11 losses and lost in the Play Off Q+E (qualification and elimination) round against Rochdale Hornets 38–24. Their top points scorer was Martyn Ridyard with 161 points

In the 2023 RFL League 1 season, Oldham finished fourth with a record of 12 wins, 1 draw and 5 losses. In the Qualifying & Elimination play-offs they lost 36–0 to Doncaster and lost 13–12 to North Wales Crusaders in the semi-finals. Their top points scorer was Martyn Ridyard with 163 points. The club returned to Boundary Park in August.

In the 2024 RFL League One season, Oldham won the league and were automatically promoted to RFL Championship with a record of 19 wins, 0 draws, 1 loss and a points difference of +741. Their top points scorer was Cian Tyrer with 140 points scored. In their first season back in the championship, Oldham enjoyed a strong year finishing 4th on the table and qualified for the playoffs.

The club's start to the 2026 season was marred by a dispute with Oldham Athletic over the ground-sharing agreement covering the club's use of Boundary Park. The dispute saw matches moved to Bower Fold in Stalybridge and the club chairman, Bill Quinn, banned from Boundary Park. Oldham Athletic denied all the claims.

== Past coaches ==
Also see Category:Oldham R.L.F.C. coaches.

- Harry Varley 1897–99
- Griff Jenkins 1954–59
- Frank Stirrup 1959–60
- Gus Risman 1960–62
- Bryn Day 1962–63
- Frank Dyson 1963–66
- Geoff Shelton 1967
- Gerry Helme 1967–69
- Graham Starkey 1970–73
- Griff Jenkins 1973–74
- Jim Challinor 1974–76
- Ken Wilson 1976
- Terry Ramshaw 1976–77
- Dave Cox 1977–78
- Brian Gartland 1979–90
- Graham Starkey 1980–81
- Frank Myler 1981–83
- Peter Smethurst 1983
- Frank Barrow 1983
- Brian Gartland 1983–84
- Frank Myler 1984–87
- Eric Fitzsimons 1987–88
- Tony Barrow 1988–90
- John Fieldhouse 1991
- Peter Tunks 1991–94
- Bob Lindner 1994
- Andy Goodway 1994–97
- Matt Munro 1997
- Bob Lindner 1997
- Paddy Kirwan 1998
- Mick Coates 1998–99
- Mike Ford 2000–02
- John Harbin 2002
- Steve Molloy 2002–04
- Gary Mercer 2005
- John Pendlebury 2005–06
- Steve Deakin 2006–08
- Tony Benson 2009–12
- Scott Naylor 2013–19
- Matt Diskin 2019–21
- Brendan Sheridan (interim) 2021
- Stuart Littler 2021–23
- Mike Ford (interim) 2023
- Sean Long 2024–25

== 2027 squad ==
Oldham RLFC 2027 Squad
First team squad			Coaching staff
(France) Valu Tanē Bentley – SR; (England) Reiss Butterworth – HK; (England) Ted Chapelhow – PR; (England) Ben Davies – CE, SO; (England) Brad Day – SR, LF; (England) Owen Farnworth – PR, LF; (England) Max Flanagan – FB, SO; (England) Luke Forber – WG	(England) Marcus Geener – SR; (England) Lucas Green – PR, LF; (England) Noah High – PR, LF; (Tonga) Ata Hingano – SO, SH; (England) Finlay Irwin – LF, SR; (England) Harry Knight – WG	(England) Ryan Lannon – SR, LF; (Scotland) Bayley Liu – CE, SR; (England) Tom Nisbet – WG, CE; (England) Ben O'Keefe – CE, WG; (England) Olly Russell – SO, SH; (England) Connor Sayner – FB; (England) Josh Simm – WG, CE; (Fiji) King Vuniyayawa – PR, SR; (England) Matty Wildie (c) – HK, SH, SO	Head coach: (England) Alan Kilshaw; Assistant coaches: (Ireland) Simon Finnigan; (England) Matty Wildie (Player-coach); Legend: (c) Captain(s); (vc) Vice-captain(s); Updated: Source(s):

== 2027 transfers ==
=== Gains ===
Player	From	Contract	Date
(England) Reiss Butterworth	Sheffield Eagles	2 years	29 September 2026
(England) Olly Russell	Wakefield Trinity	Loan until end of 2027 season	6 October 2026
(England) Harry Knight	Wakefield Trinity	1 year	22 October 2026
(England) Noah High	Wakefield Trinity	1 year	26 October 2026
(England) Lucas Green	Keighley Cougars	1 year	9 October 2026
(England) Connor Sayner	Keighley Cougars	2 years	19 October 2026
(England) Max Flanagan	Rochdale Hornets	1 year	12 October 2026
(Tonga) Ata Hingano	York Knights	3 years	23 October 2026
(Fiji) King Vuniyayawa	Newcastle Thunder	2 years	2 November 2026

=== Losses ===
Player	To	Contract	Date
(England) Jack Ormondroyd	Bradford Bulls	1 year	11 September 2026
(Australia) Cole Geyer	Catalans Dragons	2 years	10 October 2026
(Australia) Ewan Moore			12 October 2026
(England) Morgan Smith			12 October 2026
(Papua New Guinea) Emmanuel Waine			12 October 2026
(England) Jack Walker			12 October 2026
(England) Jake Bibby	Salford RLFC	1 year	14 October 2026
(England) Matty Ashurst	Salford RLFC	2 years	21 October 2026
(England) Sam Littler	Rochdale Hornets	1 year	15 October 2026
(England) Adam Milner	Sheffield Eagles	1 year	6 November 2026

=== Retired ===
Player	Date
(Australia) Josh Drinkwater	11 September 2026
(England) Iain Thornley	13 September 2026

== Seasons ==
=== Super League era ===
Season	League									Play-offs	Challenge Cup	Other competitions		Name	Tries	Name	Points
Season	Division	P	W	D	L	F	A	Pts	Pos	Play-offs	Challenge Cup	Other competitions		Top try scorer		Top point scorer	
1996	Super League	22	9	1	12	473	681	19	8th		R4						
1997	Super League	22	4	1	17	461	631	9	12th		QF						
1998	Division Two	20	10	1	9	399	383	21	5th		R3	Trans-Pennine Cup	RU				
1999	Northern Ford Premiership	28	5	2	21	449	999	12	17th		R5						
2000	Northern Ford Premiership	28	19	1	8	734	513	39	6th		R4						
2001	Northern Ford Premiership	28	21	0	7	780	416	42	4th	Lost in Final	R5						
2002	Northern Ford Premiership	27	13	3	11	748	553	29	9th	Lost in Week 3	R4						
2003	National League One	18	7	2	9	404	500	16	5th	Lost in Elimination Playoffs	R4						
2004	National League One	18	10	0	8	482	503	20	4th	Lost in Elimination Playoffs	R5						
2005	National League One	18	6	1	11	455	545	13	7th		R4						
2006	National League One	18	0	0	18	220	944	0	10th		R4						
2007	National League Two	22	16	0	6	661	420	53	4th		R5						
2008	National League Two	22	17	0	5	716	456	52	3rd		QF						
2009	Championship 1	18	10	1	7	618	449	35	4th		R5						
2010	Championship 1	20	17	0	3	694	438	52	2nd	Lost in Final	R4						
2011	Championship 1	20	11	0	9	641	533	36	7th		R4						
2012	Championship 1	18	7	1	10	465	485	28	6th	Lost in Elimination Playoffs	R5						
2013	Championship 1	16	12	1	3	508	289	41	2nd	Lost in Final	R3						
2014	Championship 1	20	15	4	1	675	457	48	3rd	Lost in Final	R4						
2015	Championship 1	22	19	3	0	840	362	38	1st		R4						
2016	Championship	23	7	0	16	401	678	14	10th		R6						
2016	Championship Shield	30	10	0	20	523	888	20	6th		R6						
2017	Championship	23	5	1	17	410	735	11	11th		R5						
2017	Championship Shield	30	6	2	22	530	939	14	7th		R5						
2018	League 1	26	16	0	10	902	325	32	5th	Lost in Semi Final	R5						
2019	League 1	20	15	0	5	655	341	30	2nd	Won in Final	R4	1895 Cup	R2				
2020	Championship (Note: The 2020 Championship was abandoned due to the COVID-19 pandemic in the United Kingdom. Statistics shown are those at time of abandonment and are not official.)	5	1	0	4	46	158	2	12th		R4						
2021	Championship	22	2	1	19	404	773	5	14th	Did not qualify	R4 (Note: Officially round 2 due to the competitions temporary restructure in 2021.)	1895 Cup	R2				
2022	League 1	20	8	1	11	571	526	17	6th	Lost in Elimination Playoffs	R2						
2023	League 1	18	12	1	5	605	333	25	4th	Lost in Semi-final	R2						
2024	League One	20	19	0	1	885	144	38	1st	Promoted	R4	1895 Cup	QF				
2025	Championship	24	15	2	7	602	450	32	4th	Lost in Elimination Playoffs	R4	1895 Cup	SF				
2026	Championship	24	21	0	3	787	403	42	3rd	Lost in Semi-final	R4	1895 Cup	QF				

== Honours ==
- First Division (1st tier) champions: 4
  - 1904–05, 1909–10, 1910–11, 1956–57
- First Division (1st tier) runners up: 5
  - 1906–07, 1907–08, 1908–09, 1921–22, 1954–55
- Challenge Cup winners: 3
  - 1898–99, 1924–25, 1926–27
- Challenge Cup runners up: 4
  - 1906–07, 1911–12, 1923–24, 1925–26
- Second Division (2nd tier) champions: 3
  - 1963–64, 1981–82, 1987–88
- Second Division (2nd tier) runners up: 1
  - 1992–93
- Second Division/Northern Ford Premiership (2nd tier) promotion final runners up: 2
  - 1992, 2001
- National League Two/Championship One (3rd tier) champions: 2
  - 2015, 2024
- National League Two/Championship One (3rd tier) runners up: 7
  - 2007, 2008, 2009, 2010, 2013, 2014, 2019
- National League Two/Championship One (3rd tier) promotion final winners: 1
  - 2019
- Lancashire League champions: 7
  - 1897–98, 1900–01, 1907–08, 1909–10, 1921–22, 1956–57, 1957–58
- Lancashire League runners up: 9
  - 1895–96, 1896–97, 1898–99, 1899–1900, 1908–09, 1910–11, 1911–12, 1923–24, 1954–55
- Lancashire Cup winners: 9
  - 1907–08, 1910–11, 1913–14, 1919–20, 1924–25, 1933–34, 1956–57, 1957–58, 1958–59
- Lancashire Cup runners up: 9
  - 1908–09, 1911–12, 1918–19, 1922–23, 1954–55, 1966–67, 1968–69, 1986–87, 1989–90
- Trans-Pennine Cup runners up: 1
  - 1998

== Records ==
- Attendance for a league match: 28,000 vs. Huddersfield Giants – 24 February 1912 at Watersheddings, Oldham
- Attendance in a cup match: 25,000 vs. Huddersfield Giants – 23 March 1912, Challenge Cup 3rd Round at Watersheddings, Oldham
- Record attendance (all games) : 62,217 vs. Hull – 18 May 1957, Championship Final at Odsal Stadium, Bradford
- International tour match attendance record : 19,620 vs. Australia – 15 September 1952 at Watersheddings, Oldham
- Record victory: 102–6 vs. West Wales Raiders – 8 July 2018
- Record defeat: 0–84 vs. Widnes Vikings – 25 July 1999
- Most all-time appearances: Joe Ferguson – 627 from September 1899 – April 1923
- Most consecutive appearances: Joe Lawton – 134 from September 1897 – November 1902
- Most goals in a season: Bernard Ganley – 224 goals in season 1957–58
- Most tries in a season: Reginald "Reg" Farrar – 49 tries in season 1921–22
- Most all-time tries: Alan Davies – 174 from 1950 to 1961
- Most points in a match: Kieran Dixon – 36 points vs. Newcastle Thunder, 11 August 2024
- Most points in a season: Bernard Ganley – 412 points in season 1957–58
- Most drop goals in a season: Ray Ashton – 9 in season 1979–80
- Fewest number of losses in a season: 1 – in 2024 RFL League One season

== The Law Cup ==
The Law Cup is an annual pre-season friendly match between Oldham and Rochdale Hornets, first contested in 1921 as the Infirmaries Cup and later renamed after the Rochdale MP Alfred Law who had originally donated the trophy. As of 2019 Oldham have won 45 to Rochdale Hornets' 20 with 2 drawn games.
