= Station Road, Swinton =

Former stadium in Pendlebury, near Manchester, England

Station Road
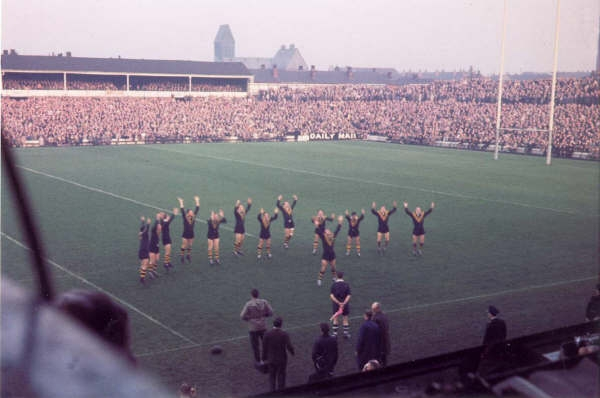
- Australia perform their "war cry" before the 2nd Test, 9 November 1963
- Interactive map of Station Road
- Full name: Station Road
- Location: Station Road, Pendlebury
- Coordinates: 53.51504°N 2.3344°W
- Owner: Swinton RLFC (1929–1992)
- Capacity: 60,000
- Surface: Grass
- Record attendance: 44,621 - Warrington v Wigan, Challenge Cup Semi Final, 7 April 1951

Construction
- Groundbreaking: 1929
- Built: 1929
- Opened: 1929
- Expanded: References
- Closed: 1992
- Demolished: 1992

Station Road was a stadium in Pendlebury, near Manchester, England. It was the home of Swinton Rugby League Club between 1929 and 1992 and was widely recognised as one of the finest grounds in the Rugby League.

Swinton moved to Station Road when they were at their peak, having won all four major trophies ("All Four Cups") the previous season, one of only three clubs (the others being Hunslet and Huddersfield) ever to do so. The decision to purchase the land, which stood alongside the railway line and Swinton railway station, was made after a breakdown in negotiations with their existing landlord at their Chorley Road ground, their home since 1887.

== International venue ==
In its heyday it boasted a capacity of 60,000, although with a record attendance of 44,621 for Warrington v Wigan in the 1951 Challenge Cup semi-final this was never really tested. All in all 19 internationals (including 15 test matches), 5 Championship finals, 17 Lancashire County Cup finals, 4 Premiership finals and 30 Rugby League Challenge Cup semi-finals were played at the ground. In addition two World Cup matches were played at Station Road.

The biggest win in any international match at Station Road was when Australia defeated Great Britain by 50-12 in the second Ashes test during the 1963 Kangaroo tour. Played in front of 30,843 fans, the match became known as the "Swinton Massacre" as the Kangaroos ran riot. Winger Ken Irvine crossed for 3 tries giving the British fans (and his opposite, Lions winger Mick Sullivan) a taste of his legendary speed, while other stars for Australia were Reg Gasnier and Peter Dimond who crossed for 2 tries each, and Gasnier's Centre partner Graeme Langlands scored 2 tries and kicked 7 goals. After winning the first test 28-2 at Wembley, the victory saw Australia regain the Ashes they had lost to the Lions at home in 1962.

1960 Rugby League World Cup

1 October 1960

| Great Britain | 33–7 | France |

Station Road, Swinton
Attendance: 22,923
Referee: Edouard Martung (France)

Britain's comprehensive victory over the French at Swinton was marred by the first double sending-off in World Cup annals, France's skipper Jean Barthe and Britain's second-rower Vince Karalius being despatched by Edouard Martung, a police inspector from Bordeaux.

1970 Rugby League World Cup

31 October 1970

| Great Britain | 27–17 | New Zealand |

Station Road, Swinton
Attendance: 5,609

Britain eliminated New Zealand from the tournament, cruising to victory with five tries to three.

List of Great Britain matches played at Station Road

| Date | Result | Competition | Attendance |
|---|---|---|---|
| 6 November 1948 | Great Britain 16–7 Australia | 1948–49 Kangaroo tour | 36,354 |
| 10 November 1951 | Great Britain 20-19 New Zealand | 1951 Great Britain vs New Zealand Test series | 29,938 |
| 8 November 1952 | Great Britain 21–5 Australia | 1952–53 Kangaroo tour | 32,421 |
| 8 October 1955 | Great Britain 25–6 New Zealand | 1955 Great Britain vs New Zealand Test series | 21,937 |
| 15 December 1956 | Great Britain 19–0 Australia | 1956–57 Kangaroo tour | 17,542 |
| 17 October 1959 | Great Britain 14–22 Australia | 1959–60 Kangaroo tour | 35,224 |
| 4 November 1961 | Great Britain 35–19 New Zealand | 1961 Great Britain vs New Zealand Test series | 22,536 |
| 9 November 1963 | Great Britain 12–50 Australia | 1963–64 Kangaroo tour | 30,843 |
| 23 January 1965 | Great Britain 17–7 France | 1965 Great Britain vs France Test | 9,959 |
| 25 September 1965 | Great Britain 9–2 New Zealand | 1965 Great Britain vs New Zealand Test series | 8,497 |
| 9 December 1967 | Great Britain 3–11 Australia | 1967–68 Kangaroo tour | 13,615 |

Also six England internationals were played at Station Road

| Date | Result | Competition | Attendance |
|---|---|---|---|
| 4 January 1930 | England 0–0 Australia | 1929–30 Kangaroo tour | 35,000 |
| 16 December 1933 | England 19–16 Australia | 1933–34 Kangaroo tour | 10,990 |
| 13 November 1937 | England 13–3 Australia | 1937–38 Kangaroo tour | 31,724 |
| 23 February 1946 | England 16–6 France | 1945–46 European Championship | 20,500 |
| 12 October 1946 | England 10–13 Wales | 1946–47 European Championship | 20,213 |
| 8 November 1947 | England 7–10 New Zealand | 1947 Great Britain vs New Zealand Test series | 29,031 |

Station Road also saw Swinton playing various Australian international touring sides.

| Game | Date | Result | Attendance | Notes |
|---|---|---|---|---|
| 1 | 30 November 1929 | Swinton def Australia 9–5 | 9,000 | 1929–30 Kangaroo tour |
| 2 | 4 November 1933 | Swinton def Australia 10–4 | 13,341 | 1933–34 Kangaroo tour |
| 3 | 24 November 1937 | Swinton def Australia 5–3 | 4,113 | 1937–38 Kangaroo tour |
| 4 | 17 November 1948 | Australia def Swinton 21–0 | 5,849 | 1948–49 Kangaroo tour |
| 5 | 18 October 1952 | Australia def Swinton 31–8 | 10,269 | 1952–53 Kangaroo tour |
| 6 | 25 November 1959 | Australia def Swinton 25–24 | 5,021 | 1959–60 Kangaroo tour |
| 7 | 23 November 1963 | Swinton drew with Australia 2–2 | 11,947 | 1963–64 Kangaroo tour |
| 8 | 25 November 1967 | Australia def Swinton 12–9 | 5,640 | 1967–68 Kangaroo tour |

== Vandalism and closure ==
Fire damaged the disused Main Stand including offices and function rooms in July 1992, this was the last in a series of vandalism before the club moved out of Station Road. Station Road was sold at the end of the 1991–92 season by the club's directors to David McLean Homes for property development, part of the deal involved sponsoring the Lions in their first season post Station Road. The last match to be played at Station Road was a local derby versus Salford on 20 April 1992 with 3,487 witnessing Salford winning 26-18 and Ian Pickavance of Swinton scoring the last try. The site is now a housing estate.
