= 1930–31 Yorkshire Cup =

- Structure: Regional knockout championship
- Teams: 15
- Winners: Leeds
- Runners-up: Huddersfield

The 1930–31 Yorkshire Cup was the twenty-third occasion on which the Yorkshire Cup competition had been held. Leeds won the trophy by beating Huddersfield in the final by the score of 10–2. This was Leeds' second of six victories in a period of ten years, during which time they won every Yorkshire Cup final in which they appeared.

== Background ==
The Rugby Football League's Yorkshire Cup competition was a knock-out competition between (mainly professional) rugby league clubs from the county of Yorkshire. The actual area was at times increased to encompass other teams from outside the county such as Newcastle, Mansfield, Coventry, and even London (in the form of Acton & Willesden.

The Rugby League season always (until the onset of "Summer Rugby" in 1996) ran from around August-time through to around May-time and this competition always took place early in the season, in the Autumn, with the final taking place in (or just before) December (The only exception to this was when disruption of the fixture list was caused during, and immediately after, the two World Wars)

== Competition and results ==
This season there were no junior/amateur clubs taking part, no new entrants and no "leavers" and so the total of entries remained the same at fifteen. This in turn resulted in one bye in the first round.

=== Round 1 ===
Involved 7 matches (with one bye) and 15 clubs

Game No	Fixture date	Home team	Score	Away team	Venue	Ref
1	Sat 11 Oct 1930	Bradford Northern	5–5	Featherstone Rovers	Birch Lane	
2	Sat 11 Oct 1930	Bramley	4–9	Castleford	Barley Mow	
3	Sat 11 Oct 1930	Dewsbury	6–8	Huddersfield	Crown Flatt	
4	Sat 11 Oct 1930	Hull	18–5	Hunslet	Boulevard	
5	Sat 11 Oct 1930	Leeds	22–2	Keighley	Headingley	
6	Sat 11 Oct 1930	Wakefield Trinity	14–0	Hull Kingston Rovers	Belle Vue	
7	Sat 11 Oct 1930	York	2–2	Halifax	Clarence Street	
8		Batley		bye		

=== Round 1 - replays ===
Involved 2 matches and 4 clubs

Game No	Fixture date	Home team	Score	Away team	Venue	Ref
R	Mon 13 Oct 1930	Halifax	9–6	York	Thrum Hall	
R	Wed 15 Oct 1930	Featherstone Rovers	49–12	Bradford Northern	Post Office Road	

=== Round 2 - quarter finals ===
Involved 4 matches and 8 clubs

Game No	Fixture date	Home team	Score	Away team	Venue	Ref
1	Tue 21 Oct 1930	Batley	2–12	Wakefield Trinity	Mount Pleasant	
2	Wed 22 Oct 1930	Huddersfield	8–6	Featherstone Rovers	Fartown	
3	Wed 22 Oct 1930	Leeds	2–2	Halifax	Headingley	
4	Thu 23 Oct 1930	Hull	12–8	Castleford	Boulevard	

=== Round 2 - replays ===
Involved 1 match and 2 clubs

Game No	Fixture date	Home team	Score	Away team	Venue	Ref
R	Mon 27 Oct 1930	Halifax	2–12	Leeds	Thrum Hall	

=== Round 3 – semi-finals ===
Involved 2 matches and 4 clubs

Game No	Fixture date	Home team	Score	Away team	Venue	Ref
1	Mon 3 Nov 1930	Huddersfield	9–5	Wakefield Trinity	Fartown	
2	Thu 6 Nov 1930	Hull	4–9	Leeds	Boulevard	

=== Final ===
The final was played at Thrum Hall, Halifax, now in West Yorkshire. The attendance was 17,812 and receipts were £1,405.

Game No	Fixture date	Home team	Score	Away team	Venue	Att	Rec	Notes	Ref
	Saturday 22 November 1930	Leeds	10–2	Huddersfield	Thrum Hall	17,812	1,405	(Note: Thrum Hall was the home ground of Halifax with a final capacity of 9,832 (The attendance record of 29,153 was set on 21 March 1959 for a third round Challenge Cup tie v Wigan). The club finally moved out in 1998 to take part ownership and ground-share with Halifax Town A.F.C. at The Shay Stadium.)	

==== Teams and scorers ====
Leeds	No.	Huddersfield
	Teams	
Jim Brough	1	John William Stocks
Eric Harris	2	Ernie Mills
Frank O'Rourke	3	Len Bowkett
Jeff Moores	4	Gwyn Parker
Harry Jones	5	Stan Brogden
Evan Williams	6	Eddie Williams
Les Adams	7	Ernest Thompson
Joe Thompson	8	Sam Gee
William Demaine	9	Cyril Halliday
Arthur Thomas	10	Clifford Morton
Richard Cracknell	11	Henry Tiffany
Jimmy Douglas	12	Tom Banks
James Gill	13	Harold Young
?	Coach	?
10	score	2
2	HT	2
	Scorers	
	Tries	
	T	
	T	
	Goals	
	G	Leonard Bowkett (1)
	G	
	Drop Goals	
	DG	
Referee		unknown

Scoring - Try = three (3) points - Goal = two (2) points - Drop goal = two (2) points

=== The road to success ===
First round
Hull	18
Hunslet	5
Bramley	4
Castleford	9
Leeds	22
Keighley	2
York	2 (6)
Halifax	2 (9)
Dewsbury	6
Huddersfield	8
Bradford Northern	5 (12)
Featherstone Rovers	5 (49)
Batley
bye
Wakefield Trinity	14
Hull Kingston Rovers	0

Second round
Hull	12
Castleford	8
Leeds	2 (12)
Halifax	2 (2)
Huddersfield	8
Featherstone Rovers	6
Batley	2
Wakefield Trinity	12

Semifinals
Hull	4
Leeds	9
Huddersfield	9
Wakefield Trinity	5

Final
Leeds	10
Huddersfield	2

== See also ==
- 1930–31 Northern Rugby Football League season
- Rugby league county cups
