= 1934–35 Yorkshire Cup =

- Structure: Regional knockout championship
- Teams: 15
- Winners: Leeds
- Runners-up: Wakefield Trinity

The 1934–35 Yorkshire Cup was the 27th occasion on which the Yorkshire Cup competition had been held. For the first and only time, the Yorkshire Cup final required two replays to sort the teams and decide the winners, Leeds eventually winning the trophy by beating Wakefield Trinity by the score of 13–0 in a second replay.

== Competition and results ==
This season there were no junior/amateur clubs taking part, no new entrants and no "leavers" and so the total of entries remained the same at fifteen.

This in turn resulted in one bye in the first round.

=== Round 1 ===
Involved 7 matches (with one bye) and 15 clubs

Game No	Fixture date	Home team	Score	Away team	Venue	Ref
1	Thu 6 Sep 1934	Hull	11–7	Hunslet	Boulevard	
2	Sat 8 Sep 1934	Castleford	9–9	Bradford Northern	Wheldon Road	
3	Sat 8 Sep 1934	Halifax	16–5	Featherstone Rovers	Thrum Hall	
4	Sat 8 Sep 1934	Hull Kingston Rovers	9–9	Keighley	Craven Park (1)	
5	Sat 8 Sep 1934	Leeds	35–8	Bramley	Headingley	
6	Sat 8 Sep 1934	Wakefield Trinity	9–7	Batley	Belle Vue	
7	Sat 8 Sep 1934	York	0–13	Huddersfield	Clarence Street	
8		Dewsbury		bye		

=== Round 1 - replays ===
Involved 1 match and 2 clubs

Game No	Fixture date	Home team	Score	Away team	Venue	Ref
R1	Wed 12 Sep 1934	Bradford Northern	13–16	Castleford	Odsal (Note: This was Bradford Northern's first Yorkshire Cup match at their new stadium, Odsal)	
R2	Fri 13 Sep 1934	Keighley	5–22	Hull Kingston Rovers	Lawkholme Lane	

=== Round 2 – quarterfinals ===
Involved 4 matches and 8 clubs

Game No	Fixture date	Home team	Score	Away team	Venue	Ref
1	Wed 19 Sep 1934	Huddersfield	6–6	Castleford	Fartown	
2	Wed 19 Sep 1934	Wakefield Trinity	10–0	Hull Kingston Rovers	Belle Vue	
3	Thu 20 Sep 1934	Halifax	2–0	Dewsbury	Thrum Hall	
4	Mon 24 Sep 1934	Leeds	19–4	Hull	Headingley	

=== Round 2 - replays ===
Involved 1 match and 2 clubs

Game No	Fixture date	Home team	Score	Away team	Venue	Ref
R	Wed 26 Sep 1934	Castleford	3–2	Huddersfield	Wheldon Road	

=== Round 3 – semifinals ===
Involved 2 matches and 4 clubs

Game No	Fixture date	Home team	Score	Away team	Venue	Ref
1	Mon 1 Oct 1934	Leeds	20–2	Halifax	Headingley	
2	Wed 3 Oct 1934	Castleford	0–10	Wakefield Trinity	Wheldon Road	

=== Final ===
The final was played at Crown Flatt, Dewsbury, now in West Yorkshire, with an attendance of 22,598, receipts were £1,529 and a final score of 5–5.

Game No	Fixture date	Home team	Score	Away team	Venue	Att	Rec	Notes	Ref
	Saturday 27 October 1934	Leeds	5–5	Wakefield Trinity	Crown Flatt	22,598	£1,529	(Note: The attendance is given as 22,598 by RUGBYLEAGUEproject, the Rothmans Rugby League Yearbook of 1991-92 and 1990-91 but 22500 by "100 Years of Rugby. The History of Wakefield Trinity 1873-1973") (Note: The receipts are given as £1,529 by the Rothmans Rugby League Yearbook of 1991-92 and 1990-91 but £1,526 by "100 Years of Rugby. The History of Wakefield Trinity 1873-1973") (Note: Crown Flatt was the home ground of Dewsbury from 1898 to 1991. The ground was becoming dilapidated, but a deliberately set fire which completely destroyed the recently renovated stand, together with all the clubs historical records, forced a move to a new ground. The final capacity is unknown but was much less than the record attendance of 26,584, set on 30 October 1920 for a second round Yorkshire Cup match to watch Dewsbury beat Halifax 3-2)	

=== Final - First Replay ===
The first replay was at Fartown, with an attendance of 10,500, receipts of £745 and a final score of 2–2.

Game No	Fixture date	Home team	Score	Away team	Venue	Att	Rec	Notes	Ref
	Wednesday 31 October 1934	Leeds	2–2	Wakefield Trinity	Fartown	10,500	£745	(Note: Fartown was the home ground of Huddersfield from 1878 to the end of the 1991-92 season to Huddersfield Town FC's Leeds Road stadium, and then to the McAlpine Stadium in 1994. Fartown remained as a sports/Rugby League ground but is now rather dilapidated, and is only used for staging amateur rugby league games. Due to lack of maintenance, terrace closures and finally major storm damage closing one of the stands in 1986, the final ground capacity had been reduced to just a few thousands although the record attendance was set in a Challenge cup semi-final on 19 April 1947 when a crowd of 35,136 saw Leeds beat Wakefield Trinity 21-0)	

=== Final - Second Replay ===
The second replay was played at Parkside, with an attendance of 19,304, receipts of £1,327 and a final score of 13–0. Altogether a total of around 52,500 people paid over £3,500 to watch the three matches. This was Leeds' fourth of six victories in a period of ten years, during which time they won every Yorkshire Cup final in which they appeared. Also the first of two consecutive victories which they would enjoy.

Game No	Fixture date	Home team	Score	Away team	Venue	Att	Rec	Notes	Ref
	Wednesday 7 November 1934	Leeds	13–0	Wakefield Trinity	Parkside	19,304	£1,327	(Note: The attendance is given as 19,304 by RUGBYLEAGUEproject, the Rothmans Rugby League Yearbook of 1991-92 and 1990-91 but 19,000 by "100 Years of Rugby. The History of Wakefield Trinity 1873-1973") (Note: Parkside was the home ground of Hunslet from 1888 to 1973. The club were struggling financially when in 1971 fire destroyed the stand, greatly reducing the ground attendance capacity, the record for which stood at the 24,700 for a third round Challenge Cup match in 1924. After the fire the directors sold the ground and wound up the club.)	

==== Teams and scorers ====
Leeds	№	Wakefield Trinity
	teams	
Jim Brough	1	W. Gordon Bonner
Stanley Smith	2	Frederick "Freddie" G. Smart
Gwyn Parker	3	Ernest Pollard
Stan Brogden	4	Fred O. Smith
Eric Harris	5	W. Farrar/Herbert Farrar
Dicky Ralph	6	C. Nat Pickard
J. Fawcett	7	A. Burrows/E. Burrows
Stan Satterthwaite	8	Jimmy A. Hobson
John Lowe	9	Harry "Tupper" Field
Leonard Higson	10	David "Sandy" Rowan
Harry Dyer	11	William "Bill" Horton
Ken Jubb	12	G H "Mick" Exley
Iorwerth Jones	13	Harry Wilkinson
	Coach	
5	score	5
	HT	
	Scorers	
	Tries	
1	T	A. Burrows/E. Burrows (1)
	Goals	
1	G	Ernest Pollard (1)
Referee		unknown
First Replay		Fartown
	teams	
Jim Brough	1	W. Gordon Bonner
Eric Harris	2	Frederick "Freddie" G. Smart
Gwyn Parker	3	Ron Moore
Stan Brogden	4	Fred O. Smith
Stanley Smith	5	W. Farrar/Herbert Farrar
Dicky Ralph	6	Ernest Pollard
Joe Busch	7	A. Burrows/E. Burrows
Leonard Higson	8	Jimmy A. Hobson
John Lowe	9	Harry "Tupper" Field
Stan Satterthwaite	10	David "Sandy" Rowan
Ken Jubb	11	William "Bill" Horton
Harry Dyer	12	G H "Mick" Exley
Septimus Aspinall	13	Harry Wilkinson
	Coach	
2	score	2
0	2	
	Scorers	
	Goals	
1	G	Ernest Pollard
Referee		unknown
Second Replay		Parkside
	teams	
Jim Brough	1	W. Gordon Bonner
Eric Harris	2	Ron Moore
Gwyn Parker	3	Fred O. Smith
Stan Brogden	4	Ernest Pollard
Stanley Smith	5	Frederick "Freddie" G. Smart
Dicky Ralph	6	C. Nat Pickard
Joe Busch	7	A. Burrows/E. Burrows
Leonard Higson	8	Jimmy A. Hobson
John Lowe	9	Harry "Tupper" Field
Stan Satterthwaite	10	David "Sandy" Rowan
Ken Jubb	11	William "Bill" Horton
Septimus Aspinall	12	G H "Mick" Exley
Iorwerth Jones	13	Harry Wilkinson
	coach	
13	score	0
?	HT	0
	Scorers	
	Tries	
3	T	no score
	T	
	T	
	Goals	
2	G	
	G	
	Drop Goals	
	DG	
Referee		unknown

Scoring - Try = three (3) points - Goal = two (2) points - Drop goal = two (2) points

=== The road to success ===
First round
Leeds	35
Bramley	8
Hull	11
Hunslet	7
Halifax	16
Featherstone Rovers	5
Dewsbury
bye
York	0
Huddersfield	13
Castleford	9 (16)
Bradford Northern	9 (13)
Wakefield Trinity	9
Batley	7
Hull Kingston Rovers	9 (22)
Keighley	9 (5)

Second round
Leeds	19
Hull	4
Halifax	2
Dewsbury	0
Huddersfield	6 (2)
Castleford	6 (3)
Wakefield Trinity	10
Hull Kingston Rovers	0

Semifinals
Leeds	20
Halifax	2
Castleford	0
Wakefield Trinity	10

Final
Leeds	5-2-13
Wakefield Trinity	5-2-0

== See also ==
- 1934–35 Northern Rugby Football League season
- Rugby league county cups
