= Sep Aspinall =

English rugby league footballer

Septimus Aspinall
Personal information
- Full name: Albert Septimus Aspinall
- Born: 7 December 1907 York district, England
- Died: c. second 1/4 1976 (aged 67) York district, England

Playing information
- Height: 5 ft 9 in (1.75 m)
- Weight: 12 st 0 lb (76 kg) -to- 13 st 10 lb (87 kg)
- Position: Centre, Second-row, Loose forward
Club
| Years | Team | Pld | T | G | FG | P |
|---|---|---|---|---|---|---|
| 1927–33 | York | 163 |
| 1933–35 | Leeds | 76 | 12 | 0 | 0 | 36 |
| 1935–38 | Huddersfield |
| 1938–≤39 | Featherstone Rovers | 20 | 3 | 0 | 0 | 9 |
| | Total | 259 | 15 | 0 | 0 | 45 |
Representative
| Years | Team | Pld | T | G | FG | P |
| 1930–32 | Yorkshire | 5 | 1 | 0 | 0 | 3 |

Albert Septimus "Sep" Aspinall (7 December 1907 – c. second ¼ 1976) was an English professional rugby league footballer who played in the 1920s and 1930s. He played at club level for York, Leeds, Huddersfield and Featherstone Rovers, as a centre, second-row, or loose forward.

== Background ==
Septimus Aspinall's birth was registered in York district, Yorkshire, he served in the Military Police during World War II, and his death was registered in York district, North Yorkshire, England.

== Playing career ==
=== Challenge Cup Final appearances ===
Septimus Aspinall did not play (injury/suspension) in York's 8-22 defeat by Halifax in the 1930–31 Challenge Cup Final during the 1930–31 season at Wembley Stadium, London on Saturday 2 May 1931, in front of a crowd of 40,368.

=== County Cup Final appearances ===
Septimus Aspinall was suspended, and so he didn't play in Leeds' 5-5 draw with Wakefield Trinity in the 1934 Yorkshire Cup Final during the 1934–35 season at Crown Flatt, Dewsbury on Saturday 27 October 1934, he returned from suspension (and Joe "Chimpy" Busch returned from injury) and played loose forward in the 2-2 draw with Wakefield Trinity in the 1934 Yorkshire Cup Final replay during the 1934–35 season at Fartown Ground, Huddersfield on Wednesday 31 October 1934, and he played at second-row in the 13-0 victory over Wakefield Trinity in the 1934 Yorkshire Cup Final second replay during the 1934–35 season at Parkside, Hunslet on Wednesday 7 November 1934.

=== Club career ===
Septimus Aspinall signed for York aged-19 on Thursday 24 November 1927. Playing alongside Welsh stand-off; Billy Thomas, he came to prominence at York, and was transferred from York to Leeds c. 1933. He was transferred from Leeds "at a substantial fee" to Huddersfield on Monday 19 August 1935. He was transferred from Huddersfield to Featherstone Rovers on Friday 26 August 1938, he made his début for Featherstone Rovers against York on Saturday 27 August 1938, and he played his last match for Featherstone Rovers during the 1938–39 season.
