= 1935–36 Yorkshire Cup =

- Structure: Regional knockout championship
- Teams: 16
- Winners: Leeds
- Runners-up: York

The 1935–36 Yorkshire Cup was the twenty-eighth occasion on which the Yorkshire Cup competition had been held.

The Yorkshire Cup competition was a knock-out competition between (mainly professional) rugby league clubs from the county of Yorkshire. The actual area was at times increased to encompass other teams from outside the county such as Newcastle, Mansfield, Coventry, and (as applying for this season) even London (in the form of Acton & Willesden. The competition always took place early in the season, in the Autumn, with the final taking place in (or just before) December (The only exception to this was when disruption of the fixture list was caused during, and immediately after, the two World Wars)

Leeds won the trophy by beating York by the score of 3–0 in the final. The match was played at Thrum Hall, Halifax, now in West Yorkshire. The attendance was 14,616 and receipts were £1,113

This was Leeds' fifth of six victories in a period of ten years, during which time they won every Yorkshire Cup final in which they appeared. Also the second of two consecutive victories which they would enjoy.

== Background ==
This season there were no junior/amateur clubs taking part, no "leavers", but there was one new entrant in the form of new London Club Acton & Willesden, thus increasing last year's total entrants to sixteen.

This in turn resulted in no byes in the first round.

== Competition and results ==
=== Round 1 ===
Involved 8 matches (with no byes) and 16 clubs

Game No	Fixture date	Home team	Score	Away team	Venue	Ref
1	Sat 14 Sep 1935	Bramley	8–37	Leeds	Barley Mow	
2	Sat 14 Sep 1935	Castleford	8–11	Dewsbury	Castleford	
3	Sat 14 Sep 1935	Featherstone Rovers	9–2	Hull Kingston Rovers	Post Office Road	
4	Sat 14 Sep 1935	Huddersfield	37–4	Bradford Northern	Fartown	
5	Sat 14 Sep 1935	Hull	18–2	Batley	Boulevard	
6	Sat 14 Sep 1935	Hunslet	18–5	Acton & Willesden (Note: This was new London club Acton & Willesden's first (and last) match in Yorkshire Cup. The club folded at the end of the season)	Parkside	
7	Sat 14 Sep 1935	Keighley	7–5	Halifax	Lawkholme Lane	
8	Sat 14 Sep 1935	York	6–2	Wakefield Trinity	Clarence Street	

=== Round 2 – quarterfinals ===
Involved 4 matches and 8 clubs

Game No	Fixture date	Home team	Score	Away team	Venue	Ref
1	Mon 23 Sep 1935	Huddersfield	8–10	Hull	Fartown	
2	Wed 25 Sep 1935	Leeds	7–4	Hunslet	Headingley	
3	Wed 25 Sep 1935	York	12–4	Keighley	Clarence Street	
4	Thu 26 Sep 1935	Featherstone Rovers	2–12	Dewsbury	Post Office Road	

=== Round 3 – semifinals ===
Involved 2 matches and 4 clubs

Game No	Fixture date	Home team	Score	Away team	Venue	Ref
1	Wed 2 Oct 1935	York	8–5	Dewsbury	Clarence Street	
2	Thu 3 Oct 1935	Hull	4–4	Leeds	Boulevard	

=== Round 3 – semifinals - Replay ===
Involved 2 matches and 4 clubs

Game No	Fixture date	Home team	Score	Away team	Venue	Ref
R	Wed 9 Oct 1935	Leeds	15–3	Hull	Headingley	

=== Final ===
Game No	Fixture date	Home team	Score	Away team	Venue	Att	Rec	Notes	Ref
	Saturday 19 October 1935	Leeds	3–0	York	Thrum Hall	14,616	£1,113	(Note: Thrum Hall was the home ground of Halifax with a final capacity of 9,832 (The attendance record of 29,153 was set on 21 March 1959 for a third round Challenge Cup tie v Wigan). The club finally moved out in 1998 to take part ownership and ground-share with Halifax Town A.F.C. at The Shay Stadium.)	

==== Teams and scorers ====
Leeds	№	York
	teams	
Jim Brough	1	Tommy Dingsdale
Eric Harris	2	H. Haigh
Stan Brogden	3	Jeff Moores
Gwyn Parker	4	S. Hunt
Stan Smith	5	P. Hargreaves
Dicky Ralph	6	Gurnos Rees
Evan Williams	7	William Thomas
Aubrey Casewell	8	Dai Prosser
John Hall	9	F. Williams
Stan Satterthwaite	10	Fred Elias
Ken Jubb	11	Norman Fender
Harry Dyer	12	L. Sharpe
Cliff Whitehead	13	W. Welsh
??	Coach	??
3	score	0
3	HT	0
Smith (1)	Scorers	
	Tries	
Stanley Smith (1)	T	
Referee		Paul Cowell (Warrington)

Scoring - Try = three (3) points - Goal = two (2) points - Drop goal = two (2) points

=== The road to success ===
First round
Huddersfield	37
Bradford Northern	4
Hull	18
Batley	2
Bramley	8
Leeds	37
Hunslet	18
Acton & Willesden	5
York	6
Halifax	2
Keighley	7
Halifax	5
Featherstone Rovers	9
Hull Kingston Rovers	2
Castleford	8
Dewsbury	11

Second round
Huddersfield	8
Hull	10
Leeds	7
Hunslet	4
York	12
Keighley	4
Featherstone Rovers	2
Dewsbury	12

Semifinals
Hull	4 (3)
Leeds	4 (15)
York	8
Dewsbury	5

Final
Leeds	3
York	0

== See also ==
- 1935–36 Northern Rugby Football League season
- Rugby league county cups
