= 1928–29 Yorkshire Cup =

- Structure: Regional knockout championship
- Teams: 15
- Winners: Leeds
- Runners-up: Featherstone Rovers

The 1928–29 Yorkshire Cup was the 21st occasion on which the Yorkshire Cup competition had been held. Leeds won the trophy by beating Featherstone Rovers in the final by the score of 5–0. The match was played at Belle Vue, in the City of Wakefield, now in West Yorkshire. The attendance was 14,000 and receipts were £838. This was Leeds' first of six victories in a period of ten years, during which time they won every Yorkshire Cup final in which they appeared.

== Background ==
The Rugby Football League's Yorkshire Cup competition was a knock-out competition between (mainly professional) rugby league clubs from the county of Yorkshire. The actual area was at times increased to encompass other teams from outside the county such as Newcastle, Mansfield, Coventry, and even London (in the form of Acton & Willesden. The Rugby League season always (until the onset of "Summer Rugby" in 1996) ran from around August-time through to around May-time and this competition always took place early in the season, in the Autumn, with the final taking place in (or just before) December (The only exception to this was when disruption of the fixture list was caused during, and immediately after, the two World Wars).

== Competition and results ==
This season there were no junior/amateur clubs taking part, no new entrants and no "leavers" and so the total of entries remained the same at fifteen. This in turn resulted in three byes in the first round.

=== Round 1 ===
Involved 7 matches (with one bye) and 15 clubs

Game No	Fixture date	Home team	Score	Away team	Venue	Ref
1	Sat 13 Oct 1928	Castleford	19–4	Keighley	Wheldon Road	
2	Sat 13 Oct 1928	Dewsbury	14–3	Batley	Crown Flatt	
3	Sat 13 Oct 1928	Featherstone Rovers	4–2	Bramley	Post Office Road	
4	Sat 13 Oct 1928	Halifax	5–8	Huddersfield	Thrum Hall	
5	Sat 13 Oct 1928	Leeds	20–5	Hull Kingston Rovers	Headingley	
6	Sat 13 Oct 1928	Wakefield Trinity	7–7	Hunslet	Belle Vue	
7	Sat 13 Oct 1928	York	14–9	Hull	Clarence Street	
8		Bradford Northern		bye		

=== Round 1 - replays ===
Involved 1 match and 2 clubs

Game No	Fixture date	Home team	Score	Away team	Venue	Ref
R	Wed 17 Oct 1928	Hunslet	11–20	Wakefield Trinity	Parkside	

=== Round 2 – quarterfinals ===
Involved 4 matches and 8 clubs

Game No	Fixture date	Home team	Score	Away team	Venue	Ref
1	Wed 24 Oct 1928	Dewsbury	26–8	Bradford Northern	Crown Flatt	
2	Wed 24 Oct 1928	Huddersfield	4–7	Featherstone Rovers	Fartown	
3	Wed 24 Oct 1928	Wakefield Trinity	7–24	Leeds	Belle Vue	
4	Wed 24 Oct 1928	York	0–8	Castleford	Clarence Street	

=== Round 3 – semifinals ===
Involved 2 matches and 4 clubs

Game No	Fixture date	Home team	Score	Away team	Venue	Ref
1	Wed 7 Nov 1928	Dewsbury	5–16	Leeds	Crown Flatt	
2	Wed 7 Nov 1928	Featherstone Rovers	10–6	Castleford	Post Office Road	

=== Final ===
24 November 1928

Leeds	5 – 0	Featherstone Rovers
Tries: O'Rourke; Goals: Thompson

Belle Vue, Wakefield
Attendance: 14,000 (Note: The attendance is given as 13,000 by RUGBYLEAGUEproject but 14,000 by the Rothmans Rugby League Yearbook of 1991-92 and 1990-91.)
Referee: F. Fairhurst (Wigan)

==== Teams ====
Leeds	№	Featherstone Rovers
	Teams	
Jim Brough	1	Sid Denton
George Andrews	2	G. Albert Taylor
Mel Rosser	3	Jack Hirst
Frank O'Rourke	4	Tom Askin
Arthur Lloyd	5	George Whitaker
Jeff Moores	6	Jim Denton
Walter Swift	7	Charles Annable
Daniel Pascoe	8	Ernest Barraclough
William Demaine	9	J. W. Smith
Joe Thompson	10	Herbert Rogerson
Arthur Thomas	11	Sam Shirley
Jimmy Douglas	12	Arthur Haigh
Frank Gallagher	13	Joe Morgan
??	Coach	xBilly Williams

=== The road to success ===
The following chart excludes any preliminary round fixtures/results

First round
Dewsbury	14
Batley	3
Bradford Northern
bye
Wakefield Trinity	7 (20)
Hunslet	7 (11)
Leeds	20
Hull Kingston Rovers	5
Halifax	5
Huddersfield	8
Featherstone Rovers	4
Bramley	2
York	14
Hull	9
Castleford	19
Keighley	4

Second round
Dewsbury	26
Bradford Northern	8
Wakefield Trinity	7
Leeds	24
Huddersfield	4
Featherstone Rovers	7
York	0
Castleford	8

Semifinals
Dewsbury	5
Leeds	16
Featherstone Rovers	10
Castleford	6

Final
Leeds	5
Featherstone Rovers	0

== See also ==
- 1928–29 Northern Rugby Football League season
- Rugby league county cups
