= Arthur Thomas (rugby league) =

GB & England international rugby league footballer

Personal information
- Full name: Arthur Gower Thomas
- Born: 19 October 1901 Llanelli, Wales
- Died: first ¼ 1970 (aged 68) Leeds, West Riding of Yorkshire, England

Playing information
- Position: Prop, Second-row
Club
| Years | Team | Pld | T | G | FG | P |
|---|---|---|---|---|---|---|
| 1922–31 | Leeds | 233 | 16 |
| 1931–≥31 | York |
| | Total | 233 | 16 | 0 | 0 | 0 |
Representative
| Years | Team | Pld | T | G | FG | P |
| | Yorkshire |
| 1926–31 | England | 3 | 1 | 0 | 0 | 3 |
| 1926–30 | Great Britain | 4 | 2 | 0 | 0 | 6 |

Arthur Gower Thomas (19 October 1901 – 1970), also known by the nickname of "Ginger", was a Welsh born English professional rugby league footballer who played in the 1920s and 1930s. He played at representative level for Great Britain, England and Yorkshire, and at club level for Hunslet Intermediates ARLFC, Leeds and York, as a prop or second-row. Although born in Llanelli, Wales, Thomas moved to Hunslet as an infant.

== Playing career ==
=== International honours ===
Thomas won caps for England while at Leeds in 1926 against Other Nationalities, in 1930 against Other Nationalities, in 1931 against Wales, and won caps for Great Britain while at Leeds in 1926 against New Zealand, in 1927 against New Zealand, in 1930 against Australia (2 matches).

=== County honours ===
Thomas won caps for Yorkshire while at Leeds.

=== County Cup Final appearances ===
Thomas played in Leeds' 5-0 victory over Featherstone Rovers in the 1928–29 Yorkshire Cup Final during the 1928–29 season at Belle Vue, Wakefield on Saturday 24 November 1928, and played in the 10–2 victory over Huddersfield in the 1930–31 Yorkshire Cup Final during the 1930–31 season at Thrum Hall, Halifax on Saturday 22 November 1930.

=== Club career ===
Thomas made his début for Leeds against Rochdale Hornets on Saturday 26 August 1922, and became a first-team regular during the 1923–24 season, consequently he missed out on the 1922-23 Challenge Cup as he was not a first-team regular, and the 1931–32 Challenge Cup Final as he had already transferred to York.
