= 1933–34 Yorkshire Cup =

- Structure: Regional knockout championship
- Teams: 15
- Winners: York
- Runners-up: Hull Kingston Rovers

The 1933–34 Yorkshire Cup was the twenty-sixth occasion on which the Yorkshire Cup competition had been held. York won the trophy by beating Hull Kingston Rovers by the score of 10–4.

== Background ==
This season there were no junior/amateur clubs taking part, no new entrants and no "leavers" and so the total of entries remained the same at fifteen.

This in turn resulted in one bye in the first round.

== Competition and results ==
=== Round 1 ===
Involved 7 matches (with one bye) and 17 clubs

Game No	Fixture date	Home team	Score	Away team	Venue	Ref
1	Wed 11 Oct 1933	Featherstone Rovers	7–12	Hull Kingston Rovers	Post Office Road	
2	Sat 14 Oct 1933	Batley	7–12	York	Mount Pleasant	
3	Sat 14 Oct 1933	Castleford	10–9	Hunslet	Wheldon Road	
4	Sat 14 Oct 1933	Dewsbury	4–5	Leeds	Crown Flatt	
5	Sat 14 Oct 1933	Halifax	23–5	Wakefield Trinity	Thrum Hall	
6	Sat 14 Oct 1933	Huddersfield	17–4	Keighley	Fartown	
7	Sat 14 Oct 1933	Hull	9–7	Bramley	Boulevard	
8		Bradford Northern		bye		

=== Round 2 – quarterfinals ===
Involved 4 matches and 8 clubs

Game No	Fixture date	Home team	Score	Away team	Venue	Ref
1	Wed 14 Oct 1933	Bradford Northern	5–8	Huddersfield	Birch Lane	
2	Wed 25 Oct 1933	Halifax	18–2	Castleford	Thrum Hall	
3	Wed 25 Oct 1933	Leeds	5–9	Hull Kingston Rovers	Headingley	
4	Wed 25 Oct 1933	York	13–2	Hull	Clarence Street	

=== Round 3 – semifinals ===
Involved 2 matches and 4 clubs

Game No	Fixture date	Home team	Score	Away team	Venue	Ref
1	Mon 6 Nov 1933	Halifax	5–7	York	Thrum Hall	
2	Mon 13 Nov 1933	Huddersfield	3–20	Hull Kingston Rovers	Fartown	

=== Final ===
The match was played at Headingley, Leeds, now in West Yorkshire. The attendance was 22,222 and receipts were £1,480.

Game No	Fixture date	Home team	Score	Away team	Venue	Att	Rec	Notes	Ref
	Sat 25 Nov 1933	York	10–4	Hull Kingston Rovers	Headingley	22,222	£1,480	(Note: The attendance is given as 22,222 by RUGBYLEAGUEproject but 22,000 by the Rothmans Rugby League Yearbook of 1991-92 and 1990-91) (Note: Headingley, Leeds, is the home ground of Leeds RLFC with a capacity of 21,000. The record attendance was 40,175 for a league match between Leeds and Bradford Northern on 21 May 1947.)	

==== Teams and scorers ====
York	No	Hull Kingston Rovers
	teams	
Tommy Dingsdale	1	George Carmichael
Lou Brown	2	Ted Tattersfield
Mel Rosser	3	Jack Spamer
Jeff Moores	4	Louis Beaumont
F. Smith	5	Roland Hill
Gurnos Rees	6	John Woodcock
William Thomas	7	Harry ‘Scrubber’ Dale
Harry Bland	8	Ben Britton
Eddie Myers	9	Harold Binks
W. John	10	W. Eddoms
Horace Coldrick	11	F. Blossom
Fred Elias	12	Charlie Brown
Norman Fender	13	George Saddington
??	Coach	??
10	score	4
3	HT	2
	Scorers	
	Tries	
Lou Brown (1), Fred Smith (1)	T	
	T	
	Goals	
Tommy Dingsdale (2)	G	George Carmichael (2)
	G	
	Drop Goals	
	DG	
Referee		unknown

Scoring - Try = three (3) points - Goal = two (2) points - Drop goal = two (2) points

=== The road to success ===
First round
Halifax	23
Wakefield Trinity	5
Castleford	10
Hunslet	9
Batley	7
York	12
Hull	9
Bramley	7
Bradford Northern
bye
Huddersfield	17
Keighley	4
Dewsbury	4
Leeds	5
Featherstone Rovers	7
Hull Kingston Rovers	12

Second round
Halifax	18
Castleford	2
York	13
Hull	2
Bradford Northern	5
Huddersfield	8
Leeds	5
Hull Kingston Rovers	9

Semifinals
Halifax	5
York	7
Huddersfield	3
Hull Kingston Rovers	20

Final
York	10
Hull Kingston Rovers	4

== See also ==
- 1933–34 Northern Rugby Football League season
- Rugby league county cups
