= 1932–33 Yorkshire Cup =

- Structure: Regional knockout championship
- Teams: 15
- Winners: Leeds
- Runners-up: Wakefield Trinity

The 1932–33 Yorkshire Cup was the fifteenth occasion on which Rugby Football League's (RFL) Yorkshire Cup competition had been held.

Leeds won the trophy by beating Wakefield Trinity by the score of 8–0

The match was played at Fartown, Huddersfield, now in West Yorkshire. The attendance was 17,685 and receipts were £1,183

This was Leeds' third of six victories in a period of ten years, during which time they won every Yorkshire Cup final in which they appeared

== Background ==
This season there were no junior/amateur clubs taking part, no new entrants and no "leavers" and so the total of entries remained the same at fifteen.

This in turn resulted in one bye in the first round.

== Competition and results ==
=== Round 1 ===
Involved 7 matches (with one bye) and 15 clubs

Game No	Fixture date	Home team	Score	Away team	Venue	Ref
1	Sat 8 Oct 1932	Bradford Northern	9–5	Hull	Birch Lane	
2	Sat 8 Oct 1932	Bramley	5–18	Hunslet	Barley Mow	
3	Sat 8 Oct 1932	Halifax	17–4	Batley	Thrum Hall	
4	Sat 8 Oct 1932	Huddersfield	12–10	Featherstone Rovers	Fartown	
5	Sat 8 Oct 1932	Leeds	13–5	Dewsbury	Headingley	
6	Sat 8 Oct 1932	Wakefield Trinity	11–2	Keighley	Belle Vue	
7	Sat 8 Oct 1932	York	3–0	Hull Kingston Rovers	Clarence Street	
8		Castleford		bye		

=== Round 2 – quarterfinals ===
Involved 4 matches and 8 clubs

Game No	Fixture date	Home team	Score	Away team	Venue	Ref
1	Mon 17 Oct 1932	Huddersfield	2–2	Halifax	Fartown	
2	Wed 19 Oct 1932	Castleford	26–9	Bradford Northern	Wheldon Road	
3	Wed 19 Oct 1932	Hunslet	7–8	Wakefield Trinity	Parkside	
4	Wed 19 Oct 1932	York	0–7	Leeds	Clarence Street	

=== Round 2 - replays ===
Involved 1 match and 2 clubs

Game No	Fixture date	Home team	Score	Away team	Venue	Ref
R	Thu 20 Oct 1932	Halifax	2–0	Huddersfield	Thrum Hall	

=== Round 3 – semifinals ===
Involved 2 matches and 4 clubs

Game No	Fixture date	Home team	Score	Away team	Venue	Ref
1	Wed 26 Oct 1932	Leeds	9–2	Castleford	Headingley	
2	Wed 2 Nov 1932	Wakefield Trinity	16–11	Halifax	Belle Vue	

=== Final ===
Game No	Fixture date	Home team	Score	Away team	Venue	Att	Rec	Notes	Ref
	Saturday 19 November 1932	Leeds	8–0	Wakefield Trinity	Fartown	17,685	£1,183	(Note: Fartown was the home ground of Huddersfield from 1878 to the end of the 1991-92 season to Huddersfield Town FC's Leeds Road stadium, and then to the McAlpine Stadium in 1994. Fartown remained as a sports/Rugby League ground but is now rather dilapidated, and is only used for staging amateur rugby league games.)	

==== Teams and scorers ====
Leeds	№	Wakefield Trinity
team unknown	teams	
	1	Gilbert Robinson
	2	Edward Brogden
Jeff Moores (position uncertain)	3	Frank Lingard
Frank O'Rourke (position uncertain)	4	Ernest Pollard
	5	Frederick "Freddie" G. Smart
	6	Joe 'Sandy' Pearce
	7	Sam Herberts
	8	Leonard Higson
	9	Sam Gee
	10	Jimmy A. Hobson
	11	William "Bill" Horton
	12	G H "Mick" Exley
	13	Harry Wilkinson
??	Coach	??
8	score	0
3	HT	0
	Scorers	
	Tries	
2	T	nil
	T	
	Goals	
1	G	
	Drop Goals	
	DG	
Referee		unknown

Scoring - Try = three (3) points - Goal = two (2) points - Drop goal = two (2) points

=== The road to success ===
First round
York	3
Hull Kingston Rovers	0
Leeds	13
Dewsbury	5
Castleford
bye
Bradford Northern	9
Hull	5
Bramley	5
Hunslet	18
Wakefield Trinity	11
Keighley	2
Huddersfield	12
Featherstone Rovers	10
Halifax	17
Batley	4

Second round
York	0
Leeds	7
Castleford	26
Bradford Northern	9
Hunslet	7
Wakefield Trinity	8
Huddersfield	2 (0)
Halifax	2 (2)

Semifinals
Leeds	9
Castleford	2
Wakefield Trinity	16
Halifax	11

Final
Leeds	8
Wakefield Trinity	0

== See also ==
- 1932–33 Northern Rugby Football League season
- Rugby league county cups
