= Jeff Moore =

Jeff or Jeffrey Moore may refer to:

- Jeff Moore (running back) (born 1956), American football player
- Jeff Moore (wide receiver) (born 1957), American football player
- Jeff Moore (basketball) (born c. 1966), American former basketball player
- Jeff Moore (soccer) (born 1980), American soccer player
- Jeffrey Moore, Canadian novelist, translator, and educator
- Jeffrey S. Moore (born 1962), American chemistry professor

== See also ==
- Jeff Moores, Australian rugby league footballer of the 1920s and 1930s
- Geoffrey Moore (disambiguation)
