= Bill Horton (rugby league) =

GB & England international rugby league footballer

Personal information
- Full name: William Horton
- Born: 17 February 1905 Knottingley, Wakefield, England
- Died: 19 January 1992 (aged 86)

Playing information
- Height: 5 ft 11 in (1.80 m)
- Weight: 13 st 9 lb (87 kg)
- Position: Second-row, Loose forward
Club
Years	Team	Pld	T	G	FG	P
1924–38	Wakefield Trinity	441	71	2	0	217
Representative
Years	Team	Pld	T	G	FG	P
1926–36	Yorkshire	20
1928–36	England	5	2	0	0	6
1928–33	Great Britain	14	2	0	0	6

William Horton (17 February 1905 – 19 January 1992) was an English professional rugby league footballer who played in the 1920s and 1930s. He played at representative level for Great Britain, England and Yorkshire, and at club level for Wakefield Trinity (captain), as a second-row, or loose forward.

== Background ==
Horton was born in Knottingley, Wakefield, West Riding of Yorkshire, England, and he died aged 86.

== Playing career ==
Hignett's Cigarette card featuring William Horton

=== Club career ===
Horton made his début for Wakefield Trinity during August 1924, he played his last match for Wakefield Trinity during the 1937–38 season.

=== International honours ===
Horton won caps for England while at Wakefield Trinity in 1928 against Wales, in 1929 against Other Nationalities, in 1932 against Wales, in 1933 against Australia, in 1936 against Wales, and won caps for Great Britain while at Wakefield Trinity in 1928 against Australia (3 matches), New Zealand (3 matches), in 1929-30 against Australia, in 1932 against Australia (3 matches), New Zealand, and in 1933 against Australia (3 matches).

=== County honours ===
Horton won cap(s) for Yorkshire while at Wakefield Trinity.

=== County Cup Final appearances ===
Horton played at second-row in Wakefield Trinity's 9-8 victory over Batley in the 1924–25 Yorkshire Cup Final during the 1924–25 season at Headingley, Leeds, on Saturday 22 November 1924, played at second-row in the 3-10 defeat by Huddersfield in the 1926–27 Yorkshire Cup Final during the 1926–27 season at Headingley, Leeds, on Wednesday 1 December 1926, played at second-row in the 0-8 defeat by Leeds in the 1932–33 Yorkshire Cup Final during the 1932–33 season at Fartown Ground, Huddersfield on Saturday 19 November 1932, played at second-row in the 5-5 draw with Leeds in the 1934–35 Yorkshire Cup Final during the 1934–35 season at Crown Flatt, Dewsbury on Saturday 27 October 1934, played at second-row in the 2-2 draw with Leeds in the 1934–35 Yorkshire Cup Final replay during the 1934–35 season at Fartown Ground, Huddersfield, on Wednesday 31 October 1934, played at second-row in the 0-13 defeat by Leeds in the 1934–35 Yorkshire Cup Final second replay at Parkside, Hunslet on Wednesday 7 November 1934, and played at second-row in the 2-9 defeat by York in the 1936–37 Yorkshire Cup Final during the 1936–37 season at Headingley on Saturday 17 October 1936.

=== Notable tour matches ===
Horton played at second-row in Wakefield Trinity's 6-17 defeat by Australia in the 1933–34 Kangaroo tour of Great Britain match during the 1933–34 season at Belle Vue, Wakefield on Saturday 28 October 1933.
