= Alf Higgs =

Wales international rugby league footballer

Personal information
- Full name: Alfred James Higgs
- Born: 1904 Pontypool, Wales

Playing information
- Position: Centre
Club
Years	Team	Pld	T	G	FG	P
1925–30	Oldham	140	37	0	0	111
1930–36	Halifax	188	61	7	0	197
	Total	328	98	7	0	308
Representative
Years	Team	Pld	T	G	FG	P
1928	Wales	1	0	0	0	0

Alfred James Higgs (born 1904) was a Welsh professional rugby league footballer who played in the 1920s. He played at representative level for Wales, and at club level for Oldham and Halifax as a centre.

== Background ==
Higgs was born in Pontypool, Wales, in 1904.

== Playing career ==
=== Club career ===
Higgs played at centre in Halifax's 22–8 victory over York in the 1930–31 Challenge Cup Final during the 1930–31 season at Wembley Stadium, London on Saturday 2 May 1931, in front of a crowd of 40,368.

=== International honours ===
Higgs won a cap for Wales while at Oldham in the 12–20 defeat by England at Central Park, Wigan on Wednesday 11 January 1928.

== Outside rugby league ==
After retiring from rugby, Higgs ran a grocery in Halifax before returning to Wales in 1940.
