= Ron Moore (rugby) =

English rugby footballer

Personal information
- Full name: Ronald Moore
- Born: Gloucestershire, England
- Died: unknown

Playing information

Rugby union
Club
Years	Team	Pld	T	G	FG	P
≤1933–33	Bream RFC

Rugby league
- Position: Centre
Club
Years	Team	Pld	T	G	FG	P
1933–36	Wakefield Trinity	62	14	1	0	44
1936–≥36	Bramley
	Total	62	14	1	0	44

Ronald Moore (birth unknown – death unknown) was a rugby union and professional rugby league footballer who played in the 1930s. He played club level rugby union (RU) for Bream RFC (in Bream, Gloucestershire), and club level rugby league (RL) for Wakefield Trinity, and Bramley, as a centre.

== Playing career ==
=== County Cup Final appearances ===
Ron Moore didn't play in Wakefield Trinity's 5-5 draw with Leeds in the 1934 Yorkshire Cup Final during the 1934–35 season at Crown Flatt, Dewsbury on Saturday 27 October 1934, but played at centre in the 2-2 draw with Leeds in the 1934 Yorkshire Cup Final replay during the 1934–35 season at Fartown Ground, Huddersfield on Wednesday 31 October 1934, and played on the wing in the 0-13 defeat by Leeds in the 1934 Yorkshire Cup Final second replay during the 1934–35 season at Parkside, Hunslet on Wednesday 7 November 1934.

=== Club career ===
Ron Moore made his début for Wakefield Trinity during October 1933.
