= Annable =

Annable is a surname. Notable people with the surname include:

- Charles Annable (1905–1957), English rugby league footballer
- Dave Annable (born 1979), American actor
- Graham Annable (born 1970), Canadian cartoonist and animator
- Odette Annable (born 1985), American actress
