= 1926–27 Yorkshire Cup =

- Structure: Regional knockout championship
- Teams: 15
- Winners: Huddersfield
- Runners-up: Wakefield Trinity

The 1926–27 Yorkshire Cup was the nineteenth occasion on which the Yorkshire Cup competition was held. Huddersfield won the trophy for the seventh time in total by beating Wakefield Trinity in the final by the score of 10–3. The match was played at Headingley, Leeds, now in West Yorkshire. The attendance was 11,300 and receipts were £863.

== Background ==
The Rugby Football League's Yorkshire Cup competition was a knock-out competition between (mainly professional) rugby league clubs from the county of Yorkshire. The actual area was at times increased to encompass other teams from outside the county such as Newcastle, Mansfield, Coventry, and even London (in the form of Acton & Willesden. The Rugby League season always (until the onset of "Summer Rugby" in 1996) ran from around August-time through to around May-time and this competition always took place early in the season, in the Autumn, with the final taking place in (or just before) December (The only exception to this was when disruption of the fixture list was caused during, and immediately after, the two World Wars).

== Competition and results ==
This season there were no junior/amateur clubs taking part, but last year's junior entrant Castleford had now turned (semi-)professional, and took part as a full league member; and so the total of entries remained the same at fifteen. This in turn resulted in one byes in the first round.

=== Round 1 ===
Involved 7 matches (with one byes) and 15 clubs

Game No	Fixture date	Home team	Score	Away team	Venue	Ref
1	Sat 9 Oct 1926	Batley	5–3	Dewsbury	Mount Pleasant	
2	Sat 9 Oct 1926	Huddersfield	21–8	Keighley	Fartown	
3	Sat 9 Oct 1926	Hull	14–0	Featherstone Rovers	Boulevard	
4	Sat 9 Oct 1926	Hull Kingston Rovers	2–2	Halifax	Craven Park (1)	
5	Sat 9 Oct 1926	Hunslet	7–13	Leeds	Parkside	
6	Sat 9 Oct 1926	Wakefield Trinity	27–3	Bradford Northern	Belle Vue	
7	Sat 9 Oct 1926	York	24–2	Castleford (Note: The first Yorkshire Cup match played by Castleford, since being newly elected to the league this season)	Clarence Street	
8		Bramley		bye		

=== Round 1 - replays ===
Involved 1 match and 2 clubs

Game No	Fixture date	Home team	Score	Away team	Venue	Ref
R	Mon 11 Oct 1926	Halifax	13–0	Hull Kingston Rovers	Thrum Hall	

=== Round 2 – quarterfinals ===
Involved 4 matches and 8 clubs

Game No	Fixture date	Home team	Score	Away team	Venue	Ref
1	Mon 18 Oct 1926	Leeds	3–26	York	Headingley	
2	Tue 19 Oct 1926	Batley	2–7	Wakefield Trinity	Mount Pleasant	
3	Wed 20 Oct 1926	Bramley	4–16	Hull	Barley Mow	
4	Wed 20 Oct 1926	Halifax	8–10	Huddersfield	Thrum Hall	

=== Round 3 – semifinals ===
Involved 2 matches and 4 clubs

Game No	Fixture date	Home team	Score	Away team	Venue	Ref
1	Wed 27 Oct 1926	Huddersfield	8–0	York	Fartown	
2	Wed 3 Nov 1926	Wakefield Trinity	15–5	Hull	Belle Vue	

=== Final ===
The final was originally scheduled to take place on Saturday 27 November 1926, but was postponed due to fog.

1 December 1926

Huddersfield	10 – 3	Wakefield Trinity
Tries: Walker, Jones; Goals: Walmsley (2)		Tries: Bateson

Headingley, Leeds
Attendance: 11,300
Referee: F. Fairhurst (Wigan)

==== Teams ====
Huddersfield	No.	Wakefield Trinity
	teams	
Syd Walmsley	1	R. Wood/Fred Wood
Arthur Walker	2	Ted Bateson
Edward Fisher	3	Billy Batten
Joe Oliver	4	Thomas "Tommy" Pickup
Joe Brook	5	Charlie Pollard
Harry Jones	6	Joe 'Sandy' Pearce
Eddie Williams	7	Jonty Parkin (c)
Arthur Sherwood	8	Thomas Coles
William Barlow	9	Robin "Bob" White
Richard Cracknell	10	W. Ralph Howell
Bryn Phillips	11	John William Higson
Henry Tiffany	12	Bill Horton
Douglas Clark	13	Charlie Glossop
??	Coach	??

=== The road to success ===
First round
Hull Kingston Rovers	2 (0)
Halifax	2 (13)
Huddersfield	21
Keighley	8
Hunslet	7
Leeds	13
York	24
Castleford	2
Batley	5
Dewsbury	3
Wakefield Trinity	27
Bradford Northern	2
Bramley
bye
Hull	14
Featherstone Rovers	0

Second round
Halifax	8
Huddersfield	10
Leeds	3
York	26
Batley	2
Wakefield Trinity	7
Bramley	4
Hull	16

Semifinals
Huddersfield	8
York	0
Wakefield Trinity	15
Hull	5

Final
Huddersfield	10
Wakefield Trinity	3

== See also ==
- 1926–27 Northern Rugby Football League season
- Rugby league county cups
