= Edward Owen (rugby) =

Welsh rugby footballer

- Ogden's Cigarette card featuring Edward James Owen

Personal information
- Full name: Edward James Owen
- Born: fourth ¼ 1903; Crumlin, Bedwellty district, Wales
- Died: unknown

Playing information

Rugby union
Club
Years	Team	Pld	T	G	FG	P
	Crumlin RFC

Rugby league
- Position: Fullback
Club
Years	Team	Pld	T	G	FG	P
1920–22	Leeds
	York
	Total	0	0	0	0	0

Edward James Owen (December 1903 – death unknown) was a Welsh rugby union and professional rugby league footballer who played in the 1920s. He played club level rugby union (RU) for Crumlin RFC, and club level rugby league (RL) for Leeds and York, as a fullback.

== Background ==
Edward Owen was born in Crumlin, Wales, and his birth was registered in Bedwellty district, Wales. He switched codes in 1920 to join English club Leeds.

== Playing career ==
=== York ===
Owen joined York in April 1922. He played fullback in York's 8–22 defeat by Halifax in the 1930–31 Challenge Cup Final during the 1930–31 season at Wembley Stadium, London on Saturday 2 May 1931, in front of a crowd of 40,368.

== Contemporaneous article extract ==
"E. J. Owen' York (Northern Rugby League.) E. J. Owen was born in Crumlin, and is proving his worth as a full back. He was discovered by Leeds officials, but the Headingley club with a great wealth of talent allowed him to go to York. He is a brilliant defensive player, and can kick with great power with either foot. He is also a great goalkeeper. Owen has been unfortunate in coming to hand when there were so many full backs of ability in the league. He was, however, selected as reserve to Sullivan for the Wales and England match in 1926."
