= Freddie Smart =

Wales international rugby league footballer

Frederick Smart
Personal information
- Full name: Frederick George Smart
- Born: c. 1906 Whitchurch, Cardiff, Wales
- Died: April 1991 (aged 85) Mansfield, England

Playing information
- Height: 5 ft 8 in (173 cm)
- Weight: 12 st 0 lb (76 kg)
- Position: Wing
Club
Years	Team	Pld	T	G	FG	P
1925–30	Huddersfield
1930–37	Wakefield Trinity	200	94	0	0	282
	Total	200	94	0	0	282
Representative
Years	Team	Pld	T	G	FG	P
1933	Wales	1

Frederick George Smart (c. 1906 – 1991) was a Welsh professional rugby league footballer who played in the 1930s. He played at representative level for Wales, and at club level for Wakefield Trinity, as a wing.

== Playing career ==
=== Huddersfield ===
Smart was signed by Huddersfield in December 1925 from rugby union club Torquay Athletic.

=== Wakefield Trinity ===
Smart was signed by Wakefield Trinity in December 1930.

Freddie Smart extended Ted Bateson's 'most tries in a season' record for Wakefield Trinity with 29-tries scored in the 1931–32 season, this record would stand for 22-years, when it was extended by Denis John Boocker in the 1953–54 season.

Fred Smart played on the wing in Wakefield Trinity's 0-8 defeat by Leeds in the 1932 Yorkshire Cup Final during the 1932–33 season at Fartown Ground, Huddersfield on Saturday 19 November 1932, played on the wing in the 5-5 draw with Leeds in the 1934 Yorkshire Cup Final during the 1934–35 season at Crown Flatt, Dewsbury on Saturday 27 October 1934, played on the wing in the 2-2 draw with Leeds in the 1934 Yorkshire Cup Final replay during the 1934–35 season at Fartown Ground, Huddersfield on Wednesday 31 October 1934, played on the wing in the 0-13 defeat by Leeds in the 1934 Yorkshire Cup Final second replay during the 1934–35 season at Parkside, Hunslet on Wednesday 7 November 1934, and played on the wing in the 2-9 defeat by York in the 1936 Yorkshire Cup Final during the 1936–37 season at Headingley, Leeds on Saturday 17 October 1936.

=== International honours ===
Fred Smart won a cap for Wales while at Wakefield Trinity in the 19-51 defeat by Australia at Wembley Stadium on Saturday 30 December 1933.
