= Harry Field (rugby league) =

GB international rugby league footballer

Personal information
- Full name: Harry Field
- Born: 1909
- Died: unknown

Playing information
- Position: Prop, Hooker
Club
Years	Team	Pld	T	G	FG	P
1927–36	Wakefield Trinity	255	19	0	0	57
1936–37	York
1937–39	Halifax	63	3	0	0	9
	Total	318	22	0	0	66
Representative
Years	Team	Pld	T	G	FG	P
1936–37	Yorkshire	2	0	0	0	0
1936	Great Britain	3	0	0	0	0

Harry Field (birth unknown – death unknown) was a professional rugby league footballer who played in the 1920s and 1930s. He played at representative level for Great Britain and Yorkshire, and at club level for Wakefield Trinity, and York, as a prop, or hooker.

== Background ==
Harry Field worked for Hemsworth Urban District Council in c. 1972.

== Playing career ==
=== Club career ===
Field made his début for Wakefield Trinity against York at Belle Vue, Wakefield on Saturday 22 October 1927, he played 150 matches as a hooker, and 105 matches as a prop, and he played his last match for Wakefield Trinity during February 1936.

Field played hooker in Wakefield Trinity's 5–5 draw with Leeds in the 1934 Yorkshire Cup Final during the 1934–35 season at Crown Flatt, Dewsbury on Saturday 27 October 1934, played hooker in the 2–2 draw with Leeds in the 1934 Yorkshire Cup Final replay during the 1934–35 season at Fartown Ground, Huddersfield on Wednesday 31 October 1934, played hooker in the 0–13 defeat by Leeds in the 1934 Yorkshire Cup Final second replay during the 1934–35 season at Parkside, Hunslet on Wednesday 7 November 1934.

Field played hooker in Wakefield Trinity's 6–17 defeat by Australia in the 1933–34 Kangaroo tour of Great Britain match during the 1933–34 season at Belle Vue, Wakefield on Saturday 28 October 1933.

Field joined York in 1936, and played hooker in the club's 9–2 victory over Wakefield Trinity in the 1936 Yorkshire Cup Final during the 1936–37 season at Headingley, Leeds on Saturday 17 October 1936.

He was transferred to Halifax in October 1937.

=== Representative honours ===
Field won caps for Great Britain while at York in 1936 against Australia, and New Zealand (2 matches).

Field won cap(s) for Yorkshire while at York.
