= 1931–32 Challenge Cup =

Rugby league competition

- Duration: 5 rounds
- Winners: Leeds
- Runners-up: Swinton

The 1931–32 Challenge Cup was the 32nd staging of rugby league's oldest knockout competition, the Challenge Cup.

== First round ==
Date	Team one	Score one	Team two	Score two
03 Feb	Uno's Dabs (St Helens)	10	Dewsbury	27
06 Feb	Barrow	65	Lindley (Huddersfield)	5
06 Feb	Batley	12	Bramley	6
06 Feb	Castleford	6	Featherstone Rovers	2
06 Feb	Great Clifton (Cumberland)	2	Broughton Rangers	20
06 Feb	Hull FC	2	Leeds	5
06 Feb	Hunslet	7	Huddersfield	5
06 Feb	Keighley	12	St Helens	6
06 Feb	Leigh	18	Wigan Highfield	0
06 Feb	Oldham	8	Rochdale Hornets	18
06 Feb	St Helens Recreation	10	Salford	6
06 Feb	Wakefield Trinity	26	Bradford Northern	8
06 Feb	Warrington	4	Hull Kingston Rovers	2
06 Feb	Widnes	2	Swinton	25
06 Feb	Wigan	10	York	4

== Second round ==
Date	Team one	Score one	Team two	Score two
20 Feb	Dewsbury	14	Broughton Rangers	0
20 Feb	Hunslet	7	Halifax	7
20 Feb	Leeds	36	Keighley	2
20 Feb	Leigh	14	Rochdale Hornets	7
20 Feb	St Helens Recreation	8	Castleford	11
20 Feb	Swinton	11	Batley	0
20 Feb	Wakefield Trinity	15	Warrington	2
20 Feb	Wigan	34	Barrow	2
22 Feb	Halifax	16	Hunslet	2

== Quarterfinals ==
Date	Team one	Score one	Team two	Score two
05 Mar	Castleford	2	Swinton	10
05 Mar	Dewsbury	7	Wakefield Trinity	14
05 Mar	Leeds	21	Leigh	2
05 Mar	Wigan	2	Halifax	8

=== Semifinals ===
Date	Team one	Score one	Team two	Score two
19 Mar	Swinton	7	Wakefield Trinity	4
19 Mar	Halifax	2	Leeds	2
23 Mar	Leeds	9	Halifax	2

=== Final ===
9 April 1932

Leeds	11 - 8	Swinton
Tries: Harris; Goals: Thompson (4)	Report	Goals Hodgson (4)

Central Park (Wigan)
Attendance: 29,000

1	Jim Brough
2	Eric Harris
3	Jeff Moores
4	Frank O'Rourke
5	Harry Goldthorpe
6	Evan Williams
7	Les Adams
8	Joe Thompson
9	John Lowe
10	Robert Smith
11	John Cox
12	Jimmy Douglas
13	Charlie Glossop

1	Bob Scott
2	Frank Buckingham
3	R. Green
4	Harold Evens
5	Jack Kenny
6	Bryn Evans (c)
7	Billo Rees
8	Miller Strong
9	Tom Armitt
10	Joe Wright
11	Martin Hodgson
12	Fred Beswick
13	Fred Butters
