= Jack Hirst (rugby league, born c. 1900) =

England international rugby league footballer

Personal information
- Full name: Jack Hirst
- Born: c. 1900; Featherstone, Yorkshire, England
- Died: 14 October 1954 (aged 54); Pontefract, Yorkshire, England

Playing information
- Height: 5 ft 8 in (1.73 m)
- Weight: 11 st 8 lb (73 kg)
- Position: Centre
Club
Years	Team	Pld	T	G	FG	P
1921–31	Featherstone Rovers	278	115	3		351
Representative
Years	Team	Pld	T	G	FG	P
1924–26	Yorkshire	4
1923	England	1	0	0	0	0

Jack Hirst (c. 1900 – 14 October 1954) was an English professional rugby league footballer who played in the 1920s and 1930s. He played at representative level for England and Yorkshire, and at club level for Featherstone Rovers as a centre.

== Background ==
Jack Hirst was born in Featherstone, Wakefield, West Riding of Yorkshire, England.

== Playing career ==
=== Club career ===
Jack Hirst made his début for Featherstone Rovers as a centre on Saturday 27 August 1921, he played his last match for Featherstone Rovers during the 1930–31 season.

Jack Hirst played at centre in Featherstone Rovers' 0–5 defeat by Leeds in the 1928 Yorkshire Cup Final during the 1928–29 season at Belle Vue, Wakefield on Saturday 24 November 1928.

=== Representative honours ===
Jack Hirst won a cap for England while at Featherstone Rovers in 1923 against Wales, and in doing so became Featherstone Rovers' first international player.

Jack Hirst had been selected for Yorkshire during the 1922–23 season, but had to withdraw through injury. Jack Hirst won caps for Yorkshire while at Featherstone Rovers; during the 1924–25 season against Lancashire and Cumberland, and during the 1925–26 season against Cumberland, and Lancashire.

== Honours ==
Jack Hirst is a Featherstone Rovers Hall of Fame inductee.
