= 1936–37 Yorkshire Cup =

- Structure: Regional knockout championship
- Teams: 16
- Winners: York
- Runners-up: Wakefield Trinity

The 1936–37 Yorkshire Cup was the twenty-ninth occasion on which the Yorkshire Cup competition had been held.

The Yorkshire Cup competition was a knock-out competition between (mainly professional) rugby league clubs from the county of Yorkshire. The actual area was at times increased to encompass other teams from outside the county such Mansfield, Coventry, this season's appearance of Newcastle, and even last year's appearance of London (in the form of Acton & Willesden. The competition always took place early in the season, in the Autumn, with the final taking place in (or just before) December (The only exception to this was when disruption of the fixture list was caused during, and immediately after, the two World Wars)

York won the trophy by beating Wakefield Trinity by the score of 9–2 in the final. The match was played at Headingley, Leeds, now in West Yorkshire. The attendance was 19,000 and receipts were £1,294

This was the York's second successive appearance in a Yorkshire Cup final, last year as defeated finalists. It was also the third and last of York's Yorkshire Cup winning appearances, although they would appear in the finals twice more, on each occasion ending as defeated finalists

== Background ==
This season there were no junior/amateur clubs taking part, one "leavers" with the loss of Acton & Willesden and one new entrant in the form of Newcastle. This resulted in the total number of entries remaining the same as last season at sixteen.

This in turn resulted in no byes in the first round.

== Competition and results ==
=== Round 1 ===
Involved 8 matches (with no byes) and 16 clubs

Game No	Fixture date	Home team	Score	Away team	Venue	Ref
1	Sat 12 Sep 1936	Bradford Northern	11–12	Leeds	Odsal	
2	Sat 12 Sep 1936	Dewsbury	8–0	Keighley	Crown Flatt	
3	Sat 12 Sep 1936	Halifax	7–0	Castleford	Thrum Hall	
4	Sat 12 Sep 1936	Huddersfield	2–8	Wakefield Trinity	Fartown	
5	Sat 12 Sep 1936	Hull Kingston Rovers	13–17	Hull	Craven Park (1)	
6	Sat 12 Sep 1936	Hunslet	19–5	Featherstone Rovers	Parkside	
7	Sat 12 Sep 1936	Newcastle (Note: Newcastle's first Yorkshire Cup match. According to "The Grounds of Rugby League", Newcastle RLFC played at Brough Park in the 1936/37 season. For 1937/38 the team moved to the new White City Stadium in Gateshead.)	7–7	Bramley	Brough Park	
8	Sat 12 Sep 1936	York	8–2	Batley	Clarence Street	

=== Round 1 - replays ===
Involved 1 match and 2 clubs

Game No	Fixture date	Home team	Score	Away team	Venue	Ref
R	Wed 16 Sep 1936	Bramley	11–7	Newcastle	Barley Mow	

=== Round 2 – quarterfinals ===
Involved 4 matches and 8 clubs

Game No	Fixture date	Home team	Score	Away team	Venue	Ref
1	Wed 23 Sep 1936	Hunslet	15–7	Halifax	Parkside	
2	Wed 23 Sep 1936	Wakefield Trinity	20–7	Bramley	Belle Vue	
3	Wed 23 Sep 1936	York	14–2	Dewsbury	Clarence Street	
4	Thu 24 Sep 1936	Hull	12–9	Leeds	Boulevard	

=== Round 3 – semifinals ===
Involved 2 matches and 4 clubs

Game No	Fixture date	Home team	Score	Away team	Venue	Ref
1	Wed 30 Sep 1936	Wakefield Trinity	11–6	Hunslet	Belle Vue	
2	Wed 30 Sep 1936	York	5–0	Hull	Clarence Street	

=== Final ===
Game No	Fixture date	Home team	Score	Away team	Venue	Att	Rec	Notes	Ref
	Saturday 17 October 1936	York	9–2	Wakefield Trinity	Headingley	19,000	1,294	(Note: The receipts are given as £1,294 by the Rothmans Rugby League Yearbook of 1991-92 and 1990-91 but as £1 less as £1,293 by "100 Years of Rugby. The History of Wakefield Trinity 1873-1973") (Note: Headingley, Leeds, is the home ground of Leeds RLFC with a capacity of 21,000. The record attendance was 40,175 for a league match between Leeds and Bradford Northern on 21 May 1947.)	

==== Teams and scorers ====
York	No.	Wakefield Trinity
	teams	
Tommy Dingsdale	1	Robert "Bob" Oliver
T. Western	2	T. Ryan /J. 'Mackie' Ryan
W. Welsh	3	John Malpass
S. Hunt	4	J. Pearman/M. Pearman
H. Haigh	5	F G "Freddie" Smart
Gurnos Rees	6	Sam Herberts
William Thomas	7	Herbert "Harry" Goodfellow
L. Sharpe	8	Harry Wilkinson
Harry Field	9	Clifford "CJ" Carter
Dai Prosser	10	Jimmy A. Hobson
Horace Coldrick	11	William "Bill" Horton
Fred Elias	12	G H "Mick" Exley
Norman Fender	13	Alfred Watson
??	Coach	??
9	score	2
0	HT	2
	Scorers	
	Tries	
S. Hunt (1)	T	
	Goals	
Tommy Dingsdale (2)	G	Robert/Robin "Bob" Oliver (1)
Norman Fender (1)	G	
	Drop Goals	
	DG	
Referee		unknown

Scoring - Try = three (3) points - Goal = two (2) points - Drop goal = two (2) points

=== The road to success ===
First round
York	8
Batley	2
Dewsbury	8
Keighley	0
Hull Kingston Rovers	13
Hull	17
Bradford Northern	11
Leeds	12
Huddersfield	2
Wakefield Trinity	8
Newcastle	7 (7)
Bramley	7 (11)
Hunslet	19
Featherstone Rovers	5
Halifax	7
Castleford	0

Second round
York	14
Dewsbury	2
Hull	12
Leeds	9
Wakefield Trinity	20
Bramley	7
Hunslet	15
Halifax	7

Semifinals
York	5
Hull	0
Wakefield Trinity	11
Hunslet	6

Final
York	9
Wakefield Trinity	2

== See also ==
- 1936–37 Northern Rugby Football League season
- Rugby league county cups
