= Geoffrey Moore (disambiguation) =

Geoffrey Moore (born 1946) is an American consultant and author.

Geoffrey or Geoff Moore may also refer to:

- Geoffrey Moore, son of actor Roger Moore
- Geoffrey H. Moore, American researcher
- Geoff Moore (born 1961), musician
- Geoff Moore (photographer)

== See also ==
- Jeff Moores, rugby league footballer of the 1920s and 1930s for Western Suburbs Magpies, Leeds, and York
- Jeff Moore (disambiguation)
