= Mick Exley =

GB & England international rugby league footballer and coach

Personal information
- Full name: George Henry Exley
- Born: 15 November 1911 Wakefield, England
- Died: February 1990 (aged 78)

Playing information
- Height: 6 ft 0 in (1.83 m)
- Weight: 14 st 12 lb (94 kg)

Rugby league
- Position: Wing, Second-row
Club
Years	Team	Pld	T	G	FG	P
1928–47	Wakefield Trinity	449	83	1	0	251
1947–48	Batley
	Total	449	83	1	0	251
Representative
Years	Team	Pld	T	G	FG	P
1932–38	Yorkshire	10	83	1	0	251
1932–39	England	3	1	0	0	3
≤1936–≥36	Great Britain	0

Rugby union
Club
Years	Team	Pld	T	G	FG	P
1939–45	Wakefield RFC Old Boys

Coaching information
Club
Years	Team	Gms	W	D	L	W%
1947–48	Batley

George Henry "Mick" Exley (15 November 1911 – February 1990) was an English rugby union, and professional rugby league footballer who played in the 1920s, 1930s and 1940s, and coached rugby league in the 1940s. He played representative level rugby league (RL) for Great Britain (non-Test matches), England and Yorkshire, and at club level for Wakefield Trinity (captain) (two spells, pre and post-World War II) and Hanging Heaton WMC ARLFC, as a wing and later as a second-row, and club level rugby union (RU) for Wakefield RFC Old Boys (in a period of dispensation for "retired" rugby league players during World War II, he would later return to rugby league with Wakefield Trinity), and coached at club level for Batley.

== Background ==
Exley was born in Wakefield, West Riding of Yorkshire, England, he worked at Yorkshire Electric Transformer Company, Brewery Lane, Thornhill Lees, and he died aged 78.

== Playing career ==
=== Club career ===
Mick Exley made his début for Wakefield Trinity during April 1929, he played his last match, during his second spell, for Wakefield Trinity during April 1947.

Mick Exley played at second-row in Wakefield Trinity's 6–17 defeat by Australia in the 1933–34 Kangaroo tour of Great Britain match during the 1933–34 season at Belle Vue, Wakefield on Saturday 28 October 1933.

Mick Exley played at second-row in Wakefield Trinity's 13–12 victory over Wigan in the 1945–46 Challenge Cup Final during the 1945–46 season at Wembley Stadium, London on Saturday 4 May 1946, in front of a crowd of 54,730.

Mick Exley played at second-row in Wakefield Trinity's 0–8 defeat by Leeds in the 1932–33 Yorkshire Cup Final during the 1932–33 season at Fartown Ground, Huddersfield on Saturday 19 November 1932, played at second-row in the 5–5 draw with Leeds in the 1934–35 Yorkshire Cup Final during the 1934–35 season at Crown Flatt, Dewsbury on Saturday 27 October 1934, played at second-row in the 2–2 draw with Leeds in the 1934–35 Yorkshire Cup Final replay during the 1934–35 season at Fartown Ground, Huddersfield on Wednesday 31 October 1934, played at second-row in the 0–13 defeat by Leeds in the 1934–35 Yorkshire Cup Final second replay during the 1934–35 season at Parkside, Hunslet on Wednesday 7 November 1934, played at second-row in the 2–9 defeat by York in the 1936–37 Yorkshire Cup Final during the 1936–37 season at Headingley, Leeds on Saturday 17 October 1936, played on the wing in the 9–12 defeat by Featherstone Rovers in the 1940–41 Yorkshire Cup Final during the 1939–40 season at Odsal Stadium, Bradford on Saturday 22 June 1940, and played at second-row in the 10–0 victory over Hull F.C. in the 1946–47 Yorkshire Cup Final during the 1946–47 season at Headingley, Leeds on Saturday 31 November 1946.

=== Representative honours ===
Mick Exley won caps for England (RL) while at Wakefield Trinity in 1932 against Wales, in 1933 against Other Nationalities, and in 1939 against France.

Mick Exley was selected for Great Britain (RL) while at Wakefield Trinity for the 1936 Great Britain Lions tour of Australia and New Zealand.

Mick Exley won cap(s) for Yorkshire (RL) while at Wakefield Trinity.

== Coaching career ==
Mick Exley was the coach of Batley from July 1947 to January 1948, he left due to other business commitments.

== Outside of rugby league ==
Mick Exley was the landlord of the Commercial Inn, Thornes Lane, Wakefield, from 1945 until 1952, and later of the Black Swan, Castleford Road, Normanton.
