= Frank O'Rourke (rugby league) =

Australian rugby league footballer

Personal information
- Full name: Augustine Francis O'Rourke
- Born: 1906; Hinton, Morpeth, New South Wales
- Died: 24 November 1994 (aged 88); Cronulla, New South Wales

Playing information
- Position: Wing, Centre
Club
Years	Team	Pld	T	G	FG	P
1924–27	Sydney University	34	15	29	0	103
1927–33	Leeds	240	112	9	0	374
1934	Sydney University
	Total	274	127	38	0	477
Representative
Years	Team	Pld	T	G	FG	P
	City
1925–27	New South Wales	8	2	3	0	12
1929–30	Other Nationalities	2	0	0	0	0

Frank O'Rourke (1906 - 1994) was an Australian professional rugby league footballer who played in the 1920s and 1930s. He played at representative level for New South Wales, City and Other Nationalities, and at club level for University of Sydney (whom he also captained) and Leeds, as a wing or centre.

== Background ==
O'Rourke was born in Hinton, near Morpeth, New South Wales, Australia in 1906, he was the cousin of the boxer; Les Darcy, he learned rugby league football while attending Marist Brothers High School in West Maitland.

== Playing career ==
O'Rourke continued with football whilst attending the University of Sydney in the early 1920s. He usually played on the wing, and was highly regarded as a future representative player. He went on to captain the club during 1926 and 1927. O'Rourke represented New South Wales and City, while at University of Sydney. O'Rourke played centre in University of Sydney's 5-11 defeat by South Sydney in the 1926 New South Wales Rugby League premiership Final at Royal Agricultural Society Grounds, Sydney on 18 September 1926. He played first grade for the 'varsity team' for four seasons between 1924-1927.

Following the lifting of the twenty-three year international rugby league transfer ban Frank O'Rourke moved to the University of Leeds in England to secure his Bachelor of Arts, and he along with fellow Australian; Jeff Moores, and New Zealander; Wally Desmond, immediately joined the Leeds rugby league club where he had huge success. During his three years at Leeds University, he and his wife depended entirely on his rugby league earnings from the Leeds club to survive. After obtaining his university degree, he stayed at Leeds for a further three seasons.

O'Rourke made his début for Leeds in the defeat by Bradford Northern, Leeds' first defeat by Bradford Northern in 19-years, and scored his first try for Leeds in the defeat by St. Helens Recreation, with 20-tries he was Leeds' top try-scorer in the 1927-28 season, with 26-tries he was Leeds' top try-scorer in the 1928-29 season, and with 27-tries he was Leeds' top try-scorer in the 1929-30 season, that included; four-tries against Batley, three-tries (a hat-trick) in the next match against Halifax, four-tries against Keighley, and five-tries against Bradford Northern. O'Rourke played centre, and scored a try in Leeds' 5-0 victory over Featherstone Rovers in the 1928–29 Yorkshire Cup Final at Belle Vue, Wakefield on Saturday 24 November 1928. O'Rourke won caps for Other Nationalities while at Leeds, in the 20-27 defeat by England at Headingley, Leeds on Wednesday 20 March 1929 in front of a crowd of 5,000, and the 18-31 defeat by England at Knowsley Road, St. Helens on Wednesday 1 October 1930, in front of a crowd of 10,000. He played in the 10-2 victory over Huddersfield in the 1930–31 Yorkshire Cup Final at Thrum Hall, Halifax on Saturday 22 November 1930. O'Rourke went on to play centre in Leeds' 11-8 victory over Swinton in the 1931–32 Challenge Cup Final at Central Park, Wigan. He played in the 8-0 victory over Wakefield Trinity in the 1932–33 Yorkshire Cup Final at Fartown Ground, Huddersfield on Saturday 19 November 1932.

O'Rourke returned to Australia to take up an educational role. After he returned from England, he played one last season for University in 1934.

== Post-playing ==
O'Rourke coached at Sydney Boys High School in the 1940s, mentoring players such as Canterbury-Bankstown Bulldogs and Cronulla-Sutherland Sharks player George Taylforth, St. George Dragons premiership winning halfback George Evans (1962, 1963, 1964, 1965) and 1991 World Cup Winning Australia rugby union coach Bob Dwyer, and was Keith McLellan's contract adviser when signing for Leeds.

O'Rourke died at the Stella Maris Nursing Home, Cronulla, New South Wales on 24 November 1994, aged 88.
