= Len Bowkett =

England international rugby league footballer

Personal information
- Full name: Leonard Charles Bowkett
- Born: 6 September 1906 Coventry, England
- Died: 5 February 1976 (aged 69) Huddersfield, England

Playing information

Rugby union
Club
Years	Team	Pld	T	G	FG	P
c. 1923–26	Coventry R.F.C.
Representative
Years	Team	Pld	T	G	FG	P
1932	Warwickshire	≥1

Rugby league
- Position: Fullback, Centre, Stand-off
Club
Years	Team	Pld	T	G	FG	P
1926–36	Huddersfield	274	37	305
1936	→ Batley (loan)	2	0	0	0	0
1936–≥37	Keighley
	Total	276	37	305	0	0
Representative
Years	Team	Pld	T	G	FG	P
1932	England	1	0	1	0	2

Leonard Charles Bowkett (6 September 1906 – 5 February 1976) was an English rugby union, and professional rugby league footballer who played in the 1920s and 1930s, and coached rugby league in the 1930s. He played representative level rugby union (RU) for Warwickshire, and at club level for Coventry R.F.C., and representative level rugby league (RL) for England, and at club level for Huddersfield, Batley (loan), and Keighley, as a fullback, centre, stand-off, and coached at club level for Keighley (A-Team).

== Background ==
Len Charles Bowkett was born in Coventry, Warwickshire, he was a pupil at Broad Street School, Coventry, he was the landlord of The Fleece Inn, Sheepridge, Huddersfield in c. 1934, and he died aged 69 in Huddersfield, West Yorkshire, England.

== Playing career ==
=== Challenge Cup Final appearances ===
Bowkett played left-centre was captain, man of the match, and scored three penalties, and two conversions in Huddersfield's 21–17 victory over Warrington in the 1932–33 Challenge Cup Final during the 1932–33 season at Wembley Stadium, London on Saturday 6 May 1933, receiving the trophy from Edward, Prince of Wales.

=== County Cup Final appearances ===
Bowkett played left-centre and scored a goal in Huddersfield's 2–10 defeat by Leeds in the 1930–31 Yorkshire Cup Final during the 1930–31 season at Thrum Hall, Halifax on Saturday 22 November 1930, played left-centre and scored a goal in the 4–2 victory over Hunslet in the 1931–32 Yorkshire Cup Final during the 1931–32 season at Headingley, Leeds on Saturday 21 November 1931.

=== Club career ===
Bowkett played two matches while on loan from Huddersfield to Batley in April 1936; the 12–9 victory over Huddersfield at Mount Pleasant, Batley on Saturday 11 April 1936, and the 7–10 defeat by Leigh at Mather Lane (adjacent to the Bridgewater Canal), Leigh on Easter Monday 13 April 1936.

=== International honours ===
Bowkett took place in a trial match for England (RU) circa-1926, and won a cap for England (RL) while at Huddersfield in 1932 against Wales.
