= Ivor Davies (rugby, born 1906) =

GB international rugby league footballer

Personal information
- Full name: Ivor James Davies
- Born: 26 April 1906
- Died: 3 November 1963 (aged 57) Halifax, England

Playing information

Rugby union
- Position: Fly-half
Club
Years	Team	Pld	T	G	FG	P
1928–29	Newport RFC	23	7

Rugby league
- Position: Stand-off
Club
Years	Team	Pld	T	G	FG	P
1929–30	Swinton	19	5	0	0	15
1930–34	Halifax	108	29	0	0	87
	Dewsbury
	Total	127	34	0	0	102
Representative
Years	Team	Pld	T	G	FG	P
1932	Great Britain	0

Ivor Davies (26 April 1906 – 3 November 1963) was a Welsh rugby union, and professional rugby league footballer who played in the 1920s and 1930s. He played club level rugby union (RU) for Newport RFC, as a fly-half and representative level rugby league (RL) for Great Britain (non-Test matches), and at club level for Halifax, as a stand-off.

== Background ==
Ivor Davies died on 3 November 1963 in Halifax, West Riding of Yorkshire, England.

== Playing career ==
=== Halifax ===
Davies started his career as a rugby union player before switching to rugby league in 1929, joining Swinton. In September 1930, he was signed by Halifax.

Davies played stand-off, and scored a try in Halifax's 22–8 victory over York in the 1930–31 Challenge Cup Final during the 1930–31 season at Wembley Stadium, London on Saturday 2 May 1931, in front of a crowd of 40,368.

In August 1934, Davies was transferred to Dewsbury.

=== International honours ===
Davies was a Great Britain (RL) tourist in 1932. However, although he played in tour matches, he didn't play in the test matches.
