= Arthur Lloyd (rugby league) =

Wales international rugby league footballer

Personal information
- Full name: Arthur Charles Lloyd
- Born: 29 January 1906; Wales
- Died: 10 March 1992 (aged 86)

Playing information
- Position: Wing, Scrum-half
Club
Years	Team	Pld	T	G	FG	P
1926–30	Leeds	125	56	0	0	168
1930–≥31	York
	Total	125	56	0	0	168
Representative
Years	Team	Pld	T	G	FG	P
1931	Wales	1

Arthur Charles Lloyd (29 January 1906 – 10 March 1992) was a Welsh professional rugby league footballer who played in the 1930s. He played at representative level for Wales, and at club level for Leeds and York, as a wing or scrum-half.

== Playing career ==
=== Club career ===
Lloyd joined Leeds from rugby union club Penarth RFC in July 1926, receiving a fee of £400.

Lloyd played scrum-half in York's 8–22 defeat by Halifax in the 1930–31 Challenge Cup Final during the 1930–31 season at Wembley Stadium, London on Saturday 2 May 1931, in front of a crowd of 40,368.

=== International honours ===
Arthur Lloyd won a cap for Wales while at York in 1931.
