= Johnny Malpass =

English rugby player and coach (1916–2005)

John Malpass
Personal information
- Full name: John Malpass
- Born: 31 May 1916; Featherstone, West Yorkshire England
- Died: January 2005 (aged 88); Wakefield, West Yorkshire, England

Playing information
- Height: 5 ft 9 in (1.75 m)
- Weight: 11 st 9 lb (74 kg)
- Position: Wing, Centre
Club
Years	Team	Pld	T	G	FG	P
1933–36	Featherstone Rovers	92	12	0	0	36
1936–47	Wakefield Trinity	146	37	1	0	113
	Total	238	49	1	0	149
Representative
Years	Team	Pld	T	G	FG	P
1936	Yorkshire	1	0	0	0	0

Coaching information
Club
Years	Team	Gms	W	D	L	W%
1947–48	Wakefield Trinity
1954–58	Wakefield Trinity
1963–66	Featherstone Rovers	123	66	55	2	54
	Total	123	66	55	2	54

John "Johnny" Malpass (31 May 1916 – January 2005) was an English professional rugby league footballer who played in the 1930s and 1940s, and coached in the 1940s, 1950s and 1960s. He played at representative level for Yorkshire, and at club level for Featherstone Rovers and Wakefield Trinity, as a wing or centre, and coached at club level for Wakefield Trinity (Assistant coach c. 1947 then Head coach), and Featherstone Rovers.

== Background ==
John Malpass was born in Featherstone, West Riding of Yorkshire, England.

== Playing career ==
=== County honours ===
John Malpass won cap(s) for Yorkshire while at Wakefield Trinity.

=== County Cup Final appearances ===
John Malpass played at centre in Wakefield Trinity's 2-9 defeat by York in the 1936–37 Yorkshire Cup Final during the 1936–37 season at Headingley, Leeds on Saturday 17 October 1936.

=== Club career ===
John Malpass made his début for Featherstone Rovers on Saturday 7 January 1933, he made his début for Wakefield Trinity during August 1936.

== Coaching career ==
=== County Cup Final appearances ===
John Malpass was the coach in Featherstone Rovers' 0-10 defeat by Halifax in the 1963–64 Yorkshire Cup Final during the 1963–64 season at Belle Vue, Wakefield on Saturday 2 November 1963.
