= Ted Bateson =

English dual-code rugby footballer, soccer player and cricketer

Personal information
- Full name: Edward Bateson
- Born: 2 July 1902; Settle, England
- Died: 1972 (aged 69–70); Lewes, England

Playing information
- Height: 5 ft 7 in (1.70 m)

Rugby union
- Position: Wing
Club
Years	Team	Pld	T	G	FG	P
≤1925–25	Skipton RFC
Representative
Years	Team	Pld	T	G	FG	P
≤1925–≤25	Yorkshire

Rugby league
- Position: Wing
Club
Years	Team	Pld	T	G	FG	P
1925–33	Wakefield Trinity	168	113	1	0	341

Edward Bateson (2 July 1902 – 1972) was a rugby union, professional rugby league and footballer, and cricketer of the 1920s and 1930s, playing representative level rugby union (RU) for Yorkshire, and at club level for Skipton RFC as a wing, club level rugby league (RL) for Wakefield Trinity, as a wing, club level association football for Blackburn Rovers, and representative level cricket for Lancashire, he also participated at athletics, boxing and tennis.

== Background ==
Ted Bateson was born in Settle, West Riding of Yorkshire, and his death was registered in Lewes, Sussex.

== Sporting career ==
=== Association football ===
Bateson made two appearances for Blackburn Rovers during the 1923–24 Football League season.

=== Rugby league ===
Bateson made his début for Wakefield Trinity in the 8–3 victory over Batley on Saturday 19 December 1925.

Bateson played on the wing in Wakefield Trinity's 3–10 defeat by Huddersfield in the 1926 Yorkshire Cup Final during the 1926–27 season at Headingley, Leeds on Wednesday 1 December 1926, the original match on Saturday 27 November 1926 was postponed due to fog.

Bateson extended the 'most tries in a season' record for Wakefield Trinity with 26-tries scored in the 1928–29 season, and 27-tries scored in the 1929–30 season, this record was extended by Freddie Smart to 29-tries in the 1931–32 season. Ted Bateson is twelfth on Wakefield Trinity's all time try scoring list.
