= Ernest Barraclough =

English rugby league footballer

Personal information
- Full name: Ernest Barraclough
- Born: unknown Ryhill, Wakefield, England
- Died: unknown

Playing information
- Height: 5 ft 11 in (1.80 m)
- Weight: 14 st 7 lb (92 kg)
- Position: Forward, Prop
Club
Years	Team	Pld	T	G	FG	P
1921–34	Featherstone Rovers	435	23	0	0	69
Representative
Years	Team	Pld	T	G	FG	P
1925/26	Yorkshire	2

Ernest "Ernie" Barraclough (birth unknown – death unknown) was an English professional rugby league footballer who played in the 1920s and 1930s. He played at representative level for Yorkshire, and at club level for Featherstone Rovers, as a prop.

== Background ==
Ernest Barraclough was born in Ryhill, Wakefield, West Riding of Yorkshire, England. He is heritage #1 for Featherstone Rovers.

== Playing career ==
=== County honours ===
Ernest Barraclough won caps for Yorkshire while at Featherstone Rovers; during the 1925–26 season against Cumberland and Lancashire.

=== County Cup Final appearances ===
Ernest Barraclough played at prop in Featherstone Rovers' 0–5 defeat by Leeds in the 1928 Yorkshire Cup Final during the 1928–29 season at Belle Vue, Wakefield on Saturday 24 November 1928.

=== Club career ===
Ernest Barraclough made his début for Featherstone Rovers as a Utility Forward on Saturday 27 August 1921.
