= Arthur Haigh =

English rugby league footballer

Personal information
- Full name: Arthur Haigh
- Born: unknown Methley, Leeds or Featherstone, Wakefield, England
- Died: unknown

Playing information
- Height: 5 ft 8.5 in (1.74 m) or 5 ft 8 in (1.73 m)
- Weight: 12 st 8 lb (80 kg) or 12 st 0 lb (76 kg)
- Position: Second-row
Club
| Years | Team | Pld | T | G | FG | P |
|---|---|---|---|---|---|---|
| 1921–30 | Featherstone Rovers | 215 | 26 | 0 | 0 | 78 |

Arthur Haigh (birth unknown – death unknown) was an English professional rugby league footballer who played in the 1920s and 1930s. He played at club level for Featherstone Rovers, as a second-row.

== Playing career ==
Arthur Haigh was born in Methley, Leeds or Featherstone, Wakefield, West Riding of Yorkshire, England.

== Playing career ==
Haigh made his début for Featherstone Rovers on Saturday 27 August 1921, and he played his last match for Featherstone Rovers during the 1929–30 season.

=== County Cup Final appearances ===
Haigh played at second-row in Featherstone Rovers' 0-5 defeat by Leeds in the 1928 Yorkshire Cup Final during the 1928–29 season at Belle Vue, Wakefield on Saturday 24 November 1928.

=== Testimonial match ===
Haigh's benefit season at Featherstone Rovers, shared with Jimmy Williams, took place during the 1928–29 season.
