= Joe Pearce (British rugby league) =

English rugby league footballer

Personal information
- Full name: Joe Pearce
- Born: unknown
- Died: unknown

Playing information
- Position: Wing, Stand-off
Club
Years	Team	Pld	T	G	FG	P
1925–≥33	Wakefield Trinity	269	36	44	0	196
1934–?	RC Roanne XIII	?	?	?	?	?
	Total

Joe Pearce (birth unknown – death unknown), also known by the nickname of "Sandy", was a professional rugby league footballer who played in the 1920s and 1930s. He played at club level for Wakefield Trinity, as a wing or stand-off.

== Playing career ==
Joe Pearce made his début for Wakefield Trinity during April 1925.

=== County Cup Final appearances ===
Joe Pearce played stand-off in Wakefield Trinity's 3–10 defeat by Huddersfield in the 1926 Yorkshire Cup Final during the 1926–27 season at Headingley, Leeds on Wednesday 1 December 1926, and played stand-off in the 0–8 defeat by Leeds in the 1932 Yorkshire Cup Final during the 1932–33 season at Fartown Ground, Huddersfield on Saturday 19 November 1932.

=== Notable tour matches ===
Joe Pearce played on the wing in Wakefield Trinity's 6-17 defeat by Australia in the 1933–34 Kangaroo tour of Great Britain match during the 1933–34 season at Belle Vue, Wakefield on Saturday 28 October 1933.
