= Jim Denton =

English rugby league footballer

Personal information
- Full name: James Darley Denton
- Born: 13 September 1900; Thornes, Wakefield, England
- Died: third ¼ 1979 (aged 78–79); Pontefract district, England

Playing information
- Height: 5 ft 8 in (1.73 m)
- Weight: 11 st 0 lb (70 kg)
- Position: Wing, Stand-off
Club
Years	Team	Pld	T	G	FG	P
1921–34	Featherstone Rovers	440	129	377	0	1141
Representative
Years	Team	Pld	T	G	FG	P
1924–27	Yorkshire	4

James Darley Denton (fourth ¼ 1900 – third ¼ 1979) was an English professional rugby league footballer who played in the 1920s and 1930s, and cricketer. He played at representative level for Yorkshire, and at club level for Featherstone Rovers, as a goal-kicking wing or stand-off.

== Background ==
Jim Denton was born in Thornes, Wakefield, West Riding of Yorkshire, England, his birth was registered in Wakefield district, and his death aged 78–79 was registered in Pontefract district, West Yorkshire, England.

== Playing career ==
=== International honours ===
Jim Denton played for "The Whites" in "The Reds versus The Whites" 1924 Great Britain Lions tour trial match, but ultimately he was not selected for the tour.

=== County honours ===
Jim Denton won caps for Yorkshire while at Featherstone Rovers; during the 1924–25 season against Lancashire, during the 1925–26 season against Cumberland, and Lancashire, and during the 1926–27 season against Cumberland.

=== County Cup Final appearances ===
Jim Denton played stand-off in Featherstone Rovers' 0-5 defeat by Leeds in the 1928 Yorkshire Cup Final during the 1928–29 season at Belle Vue, Wakefield on Saturday 24 November 1928.

=== Club career ===
Jim Denton made his début for Featherstone Rovers on the wing on Saturday 27 August 1921.

== Honoured at Featherstone Rovers ==
Jim Denton is a Featherstone Rovers Hall of Fame Inductee.

== Personal life ==
Jim Denton was the younger brother of the rugby league fullback/wing for Featherstone Rovers; Sid Denton (6 September 1899 – third ¼ 1978 (aged 78–79)).
