= Thomas Pickup =

English rugby league footballer

Tommy Pickup
Personal information
- Full name: Thomas Henry Pickup
- Born: 1 July 1901; Wakefield, Yorkshire, England
- Died: November 1994 (aged 93); Leeds, West Yorkshire

Playing information
- Height: 5 ft 9 in (1.75 m) or 5 ft 7.5 in (1.71 m)
- Weight: 10 st 5 lb (66 kg) or 10 st 9 lb (68 kg)
- Position: Centre, Stand-off
Club
| Years | Team | Pld | T | G | FG | P |
|---|---|---|---|---|---|---|
| 1920–29 | Wakefield Trinity | 257 | 43 | 14 | 0 | 157 |
| 1929–30 | Featherstone Rovers | 41 | 8 | 0 | 0 | 24 |
| | Total | 298 | 51 | 14 | 0 | 181 |
Representative
| Years | Team | Pld | T | G | FG | P |
| 1926 | Yorkshire | 1 | 0 | 0 | 0 | 0 |

Thomas "Tommy" Henry Pickup (1 July 1901 – November 1994) was an English professional rugby league footballer who played in the 1920s and 1930s. He played at representative level for Yorkshire, and at club level for Wakefield Trinity and Featherstone Rovers, as a centre or stand-off.

== Background ==
Pickup was born in Wakefield, West Riding of Yorkshire, England.

== Playing career ==
=== County honours ===
Pickup won cap(s) for Yorkshire while at Wakefield Trinity.

=== County Cup Final appearances ===
Pickup played stand-off in Wakefield Trinity's 9-8 victory over Batley in the 1924–25 Yorkshire Cup Final during the 1924–25 season at Headingley, Leeds on Saturday 22 November 1924, and played at centre in the 3-10 defeat by Huddersfield in the 1926–27 Yorkshire Cup Final during the 1926–27 season at Headingley, Leeds on Wednesday 1 December 1926, the original match on Saturday 27 November 1926 was postponed due to fog.

=== Notable tour matches ===
Pickup played at centre, and scored a try in Wakefield Trinity's 3-29 defeat by Australia in the 1921–22 Kangaroo tour of Great Britain match at Belle Vue, Wakefield on Saturday 22 October 1921.

=== Club career ===
Pickup made his début for Wakefield Trinity during August 1920, he made his début for Featherstone Rovers on Saturday 19 January 1929.

== Family ==
Pickup married Olive (née Parkin) in 1925 in Wakefield. His son Tony was an amateur centre-forward who was given a trial at Blackpool.
