= Gilbert Robinson =

Former British rugby league footballer

Personal information
- Full name: Gilbert Robinson
- Born: c. 1909
- Died: unknown

Playing information
- Position: Fullback, Centre
Club
Years	Team	Pld	T	G	FG	P
1929–33	Wakefield Trinity	91	28	18	0	120
	Barrow
1936–37	Castleford	2	0	0	0	0
	Total	93	28	18	0	120
Representative
Years	Team	Pld	T	G	FG	P
≤1932–≥32	Great Britain	0

Gilbert Robinson (born c. 1909 – death unknown) was a professional rugby league footballer who played in the 1920s and 1930s. He played at representative level for Great Britain (non-Test matches), and at club level for Wakefield Trinity and Castleford as a fullback or centre.

== Playing career ==
=== Club career ===
Robinson made his début for Wakefield Trinity during November 1929. He played fullback in Wakefield Trinity's 0–8 defeat by Leeds in the 1932 Yorkshire Cup Final during the 1932–33 season at Fartown Ground, Huddersfield on Saturday 19 November 1932. On 31 August 1933, he was signed by Barrow for a fee of £600.

In August 1936, Robinson signed for Castleford.

In April 1940, Robinson was charged with burglary and sentenced to two years imprisonment. The detective sergeant at the quarter sessions stated that after Robinson returned from the Tour in Australia, "he began gambling, drinking, and associating with thieves and other undesirable persons, with the result that he could not be relied upon, and the football clubs lost interest in him". He had previously served two shorter terms in prison for similar offences in the 1930s.

=== International honours ===
Gilbert Robinson was selected for Great Britain while at Wakefield Trinity for the 1932 Great Britain Lions tour of Australia and New Zealand.
