= Alf Watson (rugby league) =

England international rugby league footballer

Personal information
- Full name: Alfred Watson
- Born: unknown Wakefield, England
- Died: unknown

Playing information
- Height: 5 ft 11 in (1.80 m)
- Weight: 12 st 4 lb (78 kg)
Club
Years	Team	Pld	T	G	FG	P
1936–37	Wakefield Trinity	62	17	0	0	51
≤1938–≥46	Leeds
1949	Featherstone Rovers	3	1	0	0	3
	Total	65	18	0	0	54
Representative
Years	Team	Pld	T	G	FG	P
1938	England	1

Alfred "Alf" Watson (birth unknown – death unknown) was an English professional rugby league footballer who played in the 1930s and 1940s. He played at representative level for England, and at club level for Wakefield Trinity, Leeds and Featherstone Rovers.

== Background ==
During the Second World War, Watson served as a lance-corporal in the Duke of Wellington's Regiment and was captured by German forces during the Battle of France on 11 June 1940. He was held in prisoner of war camps in Germany until his release in June 1945.

== Playing career ==
=== Club career ===
Watson played loose forward in Wakefield Trinity's 2-9 defeat by York in the 1936–37 Yorkshire Cup Final during the 1936–37 season at Headingley, Leeds on Saturday 17 October 1936.

Watson made his début for Wakefield Trinity in the 11-8 victory over Acton and Willesden R.L.F.C., and he made his début for Featherstone Rovers on Saturday 5 March 1949.

=== International honours ===
Watson won a cap for England while at Leeds in 1938 against Wales.
