= Keith McLellan =

Australian rugby league footballer

Personal information
- Full name: Keith McLellan
- Born: 14 July 1929 (age 97)
- Height: 6 ft 0 in (1.83 m)
- Weight: 12 st 10 lb (81 kg)

Playing information

Rugby union
- Position: Centre
Club
Years	Team	Pld	T	G	FG	P
1948-–51	Eastern Suburbs

Rugby league
- Position: Centre
Club
Years	Team	Pld	T	G	FG	P
1951–58	Leeds	214	69	5		217
Representative
Years	Team	Pld	T	G	FG	P
1954	Combined Nationalities	1
1958	Rugby League XIII	1

Keith McLellan (born 14 July 1929) is a former Australian athlete, and rugby union, and rugby league footballer who played in the 1950s. He played club level rugby union for Eastern Suburbs RUFC, 1948-1951 and was named in the club team of the millennium in 2000. He played club level rugby league for Leeds, (Heritage number 882), and representative level rugby league for Combined Nationalities, and Rugby League XIII. He captained Leeds to a 9–7 victory over Barrow in the 1957 Challenge Cup Final. He was a long jump and triple jump athlete. In the Australian athletics championships triple jump final he finished 2nd in 1948 and 4th in 1951, and 4th in the long jump in 1950 and 1951. He grew up in Bondi Beach and was educated at Sydney Boys High School before receiving a Diploma in Physical Education from Sydney Teachers College. He taught at secondary schools in Sydney and Yorkshire before becoming a Teachers College lecturer.

== Playing career ==
Keith McLellan, after consulting with his former teacher and sports coach, the former rugby league footballer for University of Sydney and Leeds, Frank O'Rourke, signed for Leeds in November 1951 receiving a signing-on fee of £4000 (misreported as £5000; based on increases in average earnings, this would be approximately £359,200 in 2013),

McLellan was one of the last Australian rugby union players to be signed by a British rugby league club in the 1950s, as a ban was imposed in 1952. When he arrived at Leeds there were four other Australians; Arthur Clues, Bob McMaster, Bruce Ryan and Teddy Verrenkamp plus a New Zealander Bert Cook. By 1955 McLellan was the sole Australian at the club.

McLellan made his debut for Leeds in the 6–11 defeat by Doncaster on Saturday 19 January 1952, scoring his first try for the club. He subsequently played in 215 games for Leeds in 7 seasons from 1952 to 1958 scoring 217 points. A strong defender, he was a perfect foil for the attacking genius of Lewis Jones with whom he was centre partner for 6 seasons

McLellan was captain of Leeds for 3 seasons 1955/56-1957/58. He had his best season in 1956–57 when he captained Leeds to a 9–7 victory over Barrow in the Challenge Cup Final at Wembley Stadium, London on Saturday 11 May 1957, in front of a crowd of 76,318, becoming only the second Australian to lead a winning team at Wembley (after Harry Bath captained Warrington to victory in 1949–50). His leadership was crucial in Leeds' 16–10 victory over Halifax after being down 0–10 in the 3rd round of the Challenge Cup 9 March 1957, and in scoring a match winning try in Leeds 13–11 victory over Wigan in the first round, 9 February 1957.

McLellan played his last game for Leeds against Hunslet 29 September 1958, before returning to Australia.

=== Honors ===
Keith McLellan won a Challenge Cup Final winners medal in 1956-57 and two Yorkshire County League winners medals during the 1954–55 season and 1956–57 season. He was runner-up to teammate Lewis Jones in the Rugby League Press Writers Player of the Year award in 1956–57. He and Jones were also voted the best centre pairing in the League that year.

He won two cap(s) for Combined Nationalities while at Leeds in the 15–19 defeat by France on 3 January 1954, and captained the Rugby League XIII in the 19–8 victory over France on 16 April 1958.

He was inducted into the Leeds hall of fame in 2017 along with his centre partner 1952–58, Lewis Jones

== Non-playing career ==
Keith McLellan received a Diploma in physical education from Sydney Teachers College in 1949 and a Masters of Education degree from University of Sydney in 1969. He taught at secondary schools in Australia and Yorkshire before becoming a foundation staff member of Wollongong Teachers College (amalgamated with the University of Wollongong 1982) in 1962. He coached their rugby union team 1962–68. He retired as a Senior Lecturer in Education from the University of Wollongong in 1990 and purchased the Terrace Bookshop in Kiama which he ran for 5 years.

== Personal life ==
Keith McLellan married Gwen Maston, the sister of Australian Olympic silver medallist and athletics coach, June Ferguson, on 12 November 1951. They had one son Michael born 27 October 1952.
