= Jimmy Williams (rugby league) =

English rugby league footballer

Personal information
- Full name: James Williams
- Born: unknown Featherstone, Wakefield, England
- Died: unknown

Playing information
- Height: 5 ft 6 in (1.68 m)
- Weight: 11 st 0 lb (70 kg)
- Position: Stand-off
Club
Years	Team	Pld	T	G	FG	P
1921–29	Featherstone Rovers	211	30	120	0	330

Jimmy Williams (birth unknown – death unknown) was an English professional rugby league footballer who played in the 1920s. He played at club level for Featherstone Rovers, as a goal-kicking stand-off.

== Background ==
Jimmy Williams was born in Featherstone, Wakefield, West Riding of Yorkshire, England.

== Playing career ==
Williams made his début for Featherstone Rovers on Saturday 27 August 1921, and he played his last match for Featherstone Rovers during the 1928–29 season.

=== Testimonial match ===
Williams's benefit season at Featherstone Rovers, shared with Arthur Haigh, took place during the 1928–29 season.
