= RFL Yorkshire Cup =

Rugby football competition

Yorkshire Cup
- Sport: Rugby league
- Instituted: 1905
- Ceased: 1992
- Country: England
- Last winners: Wakefield Trinity (10th title)
- Most titles: Leeds (17 titles)

The RFL Yorkshire Cup is a rugby league county cup competition for teams in Yorkshire. Starting in 1905 the competition ran, with the exception of 1915 to 1918, until the 1992–93 season, when it folded due to fixture congestion.

The competition was open to all senior member clubs of the Rugby Football League in Yorkshire and was normally played in the opening months of the season. On two occasions, 1918–19 and 1940–41 the competition was held towards the end of the season due to the two world wars. During the Second World War the Lancashire Cup was not played for between 1941 and 1945 and several Lancashire clubs were admitted into the Yorkshire Cup competition instead. The cup finals in 1942, 1943 and 1944 were played over two legs with the winner being determined by aggregate score over the two matches.

== Finals ==
Season	Winner	Score	Runner-up	Venue
1905–06	Hunslet	13–3	Halifax	Park Avenue, Bradford
1906–07	Bradford FC	8–5	Hull Kingston Rovers	Belle Vue, Wakefield
1907–08	Hunslet	17–0	Halifax	Headingley, Leeds
1908–09	Halifax	9–5	Hunslet	Belle Vue, Wakefield
1909–10	Huddersfield	21–0	Batley	Headingley, Leeds
1910–11	Wakefield Trinity	8–2	Huddersfield	Headingley, Leeds
1911–12	Huddersfield	22–10	Hull Kingston Rovers	Belle Vue, Wakefield
1912–13	Batley	17–3	Hull F.C.	Headingley, Leeds
1913–14	Huddersfield	19–3	Bradford Northern	Thrum Hall, Halifax
1914–15	Huddersfield	31–0	Hull F.C.	Headingley, Leeds
1918–19	Huddersfield	14–8	Dewsbury	Headingley, Leeds
1919–20	Huddersfield	24–5	Leeds	Thrum Hall, Halifax
1920–21	Hull Kingston Rovers	2–0	Hull F.C.	Headingley, Leeds
1921–22	Leeds	11–3	Dewsbury	Thrum Hall, Halifax
1922–23	York	5–0	Batley	Headingley, Leeds
1923–24	Hull F.C.	10–4	Huddersfield	Headingley, Leeds
1924–25	Wakefield Trinity	9–8	Batley	Headingley, Leeds
1925–26	Dewsbury	2–0	Huddersfield	Belle Vue, Wakefield
1926–27	Huddersfield	10–3	Wakefield Trinity	Headingley, Leeds
1927–28	Dewsbury	8–2	Hull F.C.	Headingley, Leeds
1928–29	Leeds	5–0	Featherstone Rovers	Belle Vue, Wakefield
1929–30	Hull Kingston Rovers	13–7	Hunslet	Headingley, Leeds
1930–31	Leeds	10–2	Huddersfield	Thrum Hall, Halifax
1931–32	Huddersfield	4–2	Hunslet	Headingley, Leeds
1932–33	Leeds	8–0	Wakefield Trinity	Fartown Ground, Huddersfield
1933–34	York	10–4	Hull Kingston Rovers	Headingley, Leeds
1934–35	Leeds	5–5	Wakefield Trinity	Crown Flatt, Dewsbury
Replay 1	Leeds	2-2	Wakefield Trinity	Fartown Ground, Huddersfield
Replay 2	Leeds	13-0	Wakefield Trinity	Parkside, Hunslet
1935–36	Leeds	3–0	York	Thrum Hall, Halifax
1936–37	York	9–2	Wakefield Trinity	Headingley, Leeds
1937–38	Leeds	14–8	Huddersfield	Headingley, Leeds
1938–39	Huddersfield	18–10	Hull F.C.	Odsal Stadium, Bradford
1939–40	Featherstone Rovers	12–9	Wakefield Trinity	Odsal Stadium, Bradford
1940–41	Bradford Northern	15–5	Dewsbury	Fartown Ground, Huddersfield
1941–42	Bradford Northern	24–0	Halifax	Fartown Ground, Huddersfield
1942–43	Dewsbury	7–0	Huddersfield	Crown Flatt, Dewsbury
1942–43	Dewsbury	0–2	Huddersfield	Fartown Ground, Huddersfield
1942–43	Dewsbury won 7–2 on aggregate			
1943–44	Bradford Northern	5–2	Keighley	Odsal Stadium, Bradford
1943–44	Bradford Northern	5–5	Keighley	Lawkholme Lane, Keighley
1943–44	Bradford Northern won 10–7 on aggregate			
1944–45	Halifax	12–3	Hunslet	Parkside, Hunslet
1944–45	Halifax	2–0	Hunslet	Thrum Hall, Halifax
1944–45	Halifax won 14–3 on aggregate			
1945–46	Bradford Northern	5–2	Wakefield Trinity	Thrum Hall, Halifax
1946–47	Wakefield Trinity	10–0	Hull F.C.	Headingley, Leeds
1947–48	Wakefield Trinity	7–7	Leeds	Fartown Ground, Huddersfield
Replay	Wakefield Trinity	8–7	Leeds	Odsal Stadium, Bradford
1948–49	Bradford Northern	18–9	Castleford	Headingley, Leeds
1949–50	Bradford Northern	11–4	Huddersfield	Headingley, Leeds
1950–51	Huddersfield	16–3	Castleford	Headingley, Leeds
1951–52	Wakefield Trinity	17–3	Keighley	Fartown Ground, Huddersfield
1952–53	Huddersfield	18–8	Batley	Headingley, Leeds
1953–54	Bradford Northern	7–2	Hull F.C.	Headingley, Leeds
1954–55	Halifax	22–14	Hull F.C.	Headingley, Leeds
1955–56	Halifax	10–10	Hull F.C.	Headingley, Leeds
Replay	Halifax	7–0	Hull F.C.	Odsal Stadium, Bradford
1956–57	Wakefield Trinity	23–5	Hunslet	Headingley, Leeds
1957–58	Huddersfield	15–8	York	Headingley, Leeds
1958–59	Leeds	24–20	Wakefield Trinity	Odsal, Bradford
1959–60	Featherstone Rovers	15–14	Hull F.C.	Headingley, Leeds
1960–61	Wakefield Trinity	16–10	Huddersfield	Headingley, Leeds
1961–62	Wakefield Trinity	19–9	Leeds	Odsal Stadium, Bradford
1962–63	Hunslet	12–2	Hull Kingston Rovers	Headingley, Leeds
1963–64	Halifax	10–0	Featherstone Rovers	Belle Vue, Wakefield
1964–65	Wakefield Trinity	18–2	Leeds	Fartown Ground, Huddersfield
1965–66	Bradford Northern	17–8	Hunslet	Headingley, Leeds
1966–67	Hull Kingston Rovers	25–12	Featherstone Rovers	Headingley, Leeds
1967–68	Hull Kingston Rovers	8–7	Hull F.C.	Headingley, Leeds
1968–69	Leeds	22–11	Castleford	Belle Vue, Wakefield
1969–70	Hull F.C.	12–9	Featherstone Rovers	Headingley, Leeds
1970–71	Leeds	23–7	Featherstone Rovers	Odsal Stadium, Bradford
1971–72	Hull Kingston Rovers	11–7	Castleford	Belle Vue, Wakefield
1972–73	Leeds	36–9	Dewsbury	Odsal Stadium, Bradford
1973–74	Leeds	7–2	Wakefield Trinity	Headingley, Leeds
1974–75	Hull Kingston Rovers	16–13	Wakefield Trinity	Headingley, Leeds
1975–76	Leeds	15–11	Hull Kingston Rovers	Headingley, Leeds
1976–77	Leeds	16–12	Featherstone Rovers	Headingley, Leeds
1977–78	Castleford	17–7	Featherstone Rovers	Headingley, Leeds
1978–79	Bradford Northern	18–8	York	Headingley, Leeds
1979–80	Leeds	15–6	Halifax	Headingley, Leeds
1980–81	Leeds	8–7	Hull Kingston Rovers	Fartown Ground, Huddersfield
1981–82	Castleford	10–5	Bradford Northern	Headingley, Leeds
1982–83	Hull F.C.	18–7	Bradford Northern	Headingley, Leeds
1983–84	Hull F.C.	13–2	Castleford	Elland Road, Leeds
1984–85	Hull F.C.	29–12	Hull Kingston Rovers	Boothferry Park, Hull
1985–86	Hull Kingston Rovers	22–18	Castleford	Headingley, Leeds
1986–87	Castleford	31–24	Hull F.C.	Headingley, Leeds
1987–88	Bradford Northern	12–12,	Castleford	Headingley, Leeds
Replay	Bradford Northern	11–2	Castleford	Elland Road, Leeds
1988–89	Leeds	33–12	Castleford	Elland Road, Leeds
1989–90	Bradford Northern	20–14	Featherstone Rovers	Headingley, Leeds
1990–91	Castleford	11–8	Wakefield Trinity	Elland Road, Leeds
1991–92	Castleford	28–6	Bradford Northern	Elland Road, Leeds
1992–93	Wakefield Trinity	29–16	Sheffield Eagles	Elland Road, Leeds

=== Wins by club ===
	Club	Wins	Winning years
1	Leeds	17	1921, 1928, 1930, 1932, 1934, 1935, 1937, 1958, 1968, 1970, 1972, 1973, 1975, 1976, 1979, 1980 & 1988
2	Huddersfield	12	1909, 1911, 1913, 1914, 1919, (Note: The 1918–1919 competition was played in April — May 1919) 1919, 1926, 1931, 1938, 1950, 1952 & 1957
3	Bradford	11	1941, (Note: The 1940–1941 competition was played in March — April 1941) 1941, 1943, 1945, 1948, 1949, 1953, 1965, 1978, 1987 & 1989
4	Wakefield Trinity	10	1910, 1924, 1946, 1947, 1951, 1956, 1960, 1961, 1964 & 1992
5	Hull Kingston Rovers	7	1920, 1929, 1966, 1967, 1971, 1974 & 1985
6=	Castleford	5	1977, 1981, 1986, 1990 & 1991
6=	Hull F.C.	5	1923, 1969, 1982, 1983 & 1984
6=	Halifax	5	1908, 1944, 1954, 1955 & 1963
9=	Hunslet	3	1905, 1907 & 1962
9=	Dewsbury	3	1925, 1927 & 1942
9=	York	3	1922, 1933 & 1936
12	Featherstone Rovers	2	1940 & 1959
13=	Batley	1	1912
13=	Bradford FC	1	1906

== Sponsors ==
Years	Sponsor	Name
1972–1979	Esso	Esso Yorkshire Cup
1980–1982	Webster's Brewery	Webster's Yorkshire Cup
1983–1984	Phillips	Phillips Yorkshire Cup
1985–1992	John Smith's Brewery	John Smith's Yorkshire Cup

== Records ==
=== Cup final ===
- Most appearances: 21, Leeds
- Most wins: 17, Leeds
- Most consecutive wins: 4, Huddersfield 1913-14, 14-15, 1919 Spring & 1919 Autumn
- Highest score: 34–8, Leeds v Dewsbury 1972
- Highest aggregate score: 65, 31-24 Castleford v Hull F.C. 1986
- Lowest aggregate score: 2–0 on four occasions 1920, 1925, 1942, 1944
- Biggest winning margin: 28, 30–2 Huddersfield v Hull 1914
- Biggest attendance: 36,000, Bradford Northern v Huddersfield at Headingley 1949
- Smallest attendance: 5,536, Castleford v Hull Kingston Rovers at Belle Vue 1971
- Highest receipts: £83,591 Leeds v Castleford at Elland Road 1988

=== Individual records in the final ===
- Most tries in a final: 4, Stan Moorhouse for Huddersfield v Leeds 1919
- Most goals in a final: 6, David Stephenson for Leeds v Castleford 1988
- Most points in a final: 16, Graham Steadman (4 goals and 2 tries) for Castleford v Bradford Northern 1991
- Most appearances in a final: 10, Douglas Clark, Huddersfield 1909, 1910, 1911, 1913, 1914, 1919 Spring, 1919 Autumn, 1923, 1925, 1926
- Most tries in finals: 6 (two times), Stan Moorhouse, Huddersfield 1911, 1914, 1919 Autumn and Stan Smith, Leeds 1934, 1935, 1937
- Most goals in finals: 19, Neil Fox Wakefield Trinity, Hull Kingston Rovers & Bradford Northern 1958, 1960, 1961, 1964, 1975, 1978
- Most points in finals: 53, Neil Fox Wakefield Trinity, Hull Kingston Rovers & Bradford Northern 1958, 1960, 1961, 1964, 1975, 1978

=== Competition records ===
- Highest score: 6–100, Nottingham City v Hull Kingston Rovers 1990
- Highest score v a junior club: 79–5, Huddersfield v Yorkshire Amateurs 1948
- Highest aggregate score in two-legged fixture: 140–5, Huddersfield v Yorkshire Amateurs 1948

== White Rose Trophy ==
Between 1966 and 1993 a trophy, called the White Rose Trophy, was awarded to the man of the match in each final. The judging was conducted by members of the press.

== 2019 revival ==
In 2019, the name of the competition was reused as a pre-season tournament between seven of the non-Super League teams; Batley, Bradford, Dewsbury, Featherstone, Halifax, Hunslet and York; and amateur side Hunslet Club Parkside. The competition was a one-off has not been played since.

Bradford Bulls won the tournament beating Batley Bulldogs 14–12 at Mount Pleasant, Batley.

== See also ==
- RFL Yorkshire League
