= Gwyn Parker =

Wales international rugby league footballer

Personal information
- Born: 7 December 1907; Cwmafan, Wales
- Died: 14 January 1995 (aged 87); Huddersfield, England

Playing information

Rugby union
Club
Years	Team	Pld	T	G	FG	P
192?–27	Neath RFC

Rugby league
- Position: Centre, Wing
Club
Years	Team	Pld	T	G	FG	P
1927–34	Huddersfield
1934–37	Leeds
1937–38	Keighley
1938–39	York
1939	Rochdale Hornets
	Total	0	0	0	0	0
Representative
Years	Team	Pld	T	G	FG	P
1927–31	Glamorgan & Monmouthshire	3	1	0	0	3
1928–35	Wales	4	2	0	0	6
- Relatives: Tommy Parker (brother)

Gwyn Parker (1907 – 1995) was a Welsh professional rugby league footballer who played in the 1920s and 1930s, as a centre or wing. He played at representative level for Wales, and at club level for Huddersfield, Leeds, Keighley, Rochdale Hornets, and York.

== Playing career ==
=== Club career ===
Parker grew up in Cwmafan, Wales, and represented the Welsh Schools team in rugby union. He went on to play for Neath before moving to England in 1927 to play rugby league for Huddersfield.

At Huddersfield, he was part of the team that won the league championship in 1928–29 and 1929–30, and helped the club win the 1931–32 Yorkshire Cup.

After being placed on the transfer list at his own request, he moved to Leeds in January 1934 for a fee of £400. He helped Leeds win the 1934–35 and 1935–36 Yorkshire Cup, and played at Wembley for the club in the 1936 Challenge Cup final, scoring a try in the 18–2 win over Warrington.

In 1937, he joined Keighley, and played in the 1937 Challenge Cup final defeat against Widnes. He moved to York in 1938 before finishing his career with Rochdale Hornets.

=== Representative honours ===
Parker won four caps for Wales between 1928 and 1935. He also represented Glamorgan & Monmouthshire in the County Championship.

== Personal life ==
Gwyn Parker's older brother, Tommy Parker, was also a rugby league player.
