= Charlie Glossop =

English rugby league footballer and coach

Personal information
- Full name: Charles Henry Glossop
- Born: second ¼ 1903; Wakefield district, England
- Died: 1978 (aged 74–75)

Playing information
- Height: 10 ft 9 in (3.28 m)
- Weight: 11 st 10 lb (74 kg)
- Position: Forwards
Club
Years	Team	Pld	T	G	FG	P
1923–31	Wakefield Trinity	287	54	0	0	162
1931–33	Leeds
1933–34	Batley	52	12	0	0	36
	Total	339	66	0	0	198
Representative
Years	Team	Pld	T	G	FG	P
1930	England	1	0	0	0	0

Coaching information
Club
Years	Team	Gms	W	D	L	W%
1934–35	Batley

Charles "Charlie" Henry Glossop (birth registered second ¼ 1903 – 1978) was an English professional rugby league footballer who played in the 1920s and 1930s, and coached in the 1930s. He played at representative level for England, and at club level for Wakefield Trinity, Leeds and Batley (captain), as a forward, and coached at club level for Batley.

== Background ==
Glossop's birth was registered in Wakefield district, West Riding of Yorkshire, England, and he died aged 74–75.

== Playing career ==
=== Club career ===
Glossop played loose forward in Wakefield Trinity's 9-8 victory over Batley in the 1924–25 Yorkshire Cup Final during the 1924–25 season at Headingley, Leeds on Saturday 22 November 1924, and in the 3-10 defeat by Huddersfield in the 1926 Yorkshire Cup Final during the 1926–27 season at Headingley, Leeds on Wednesday 1 December 1926, the original match on Saturday 27 November 1926 was postponed due to fog.

Glossop was transferred from Leeds to Batley on 19 January 1933, he retired through injury in July 1934.

=== International honours ===
Glossop won a cap for England while at Wakefield Trinity in 1930 against Other Nationalities.

== Coaching career ==
Glossop was the coach of Batley from November 1934 to February 1935.
