= Samuel Gee (rugby league) =

England international rugby league footballer

Sam Gee
Personal information
- Full name: Samuel Gee

Playing information
- Position: Prop, Hooker
Club
Years	Team	Pld	T	G	FG	P
1927–31	Huddersfield	118	5	3	0	21
1931–32	Wakefield Trinity	44	1	0	0	3
	Total	162	6	3	0	24
Representative
Years	Team	Pld	T	G	FG	P
1930	England	1	0	0	0	0

Samuel "Sam" Gee was an English professional rugby league footballer who played in the 1920s and 1930s. He played at representative level for England, and at club level for Huddersfield and Wakefield Trinity, as a prop or hooker.

He is the uncle of rugby league footballer Ken Gee, and the great-uncle of rugby league footballer Sam Gee.

== International honours ==
Sam Gee won a cap for England while at Huddersfield in 1930 against Other Nationalities.
