= Sam Gee =

English rugby league footballer

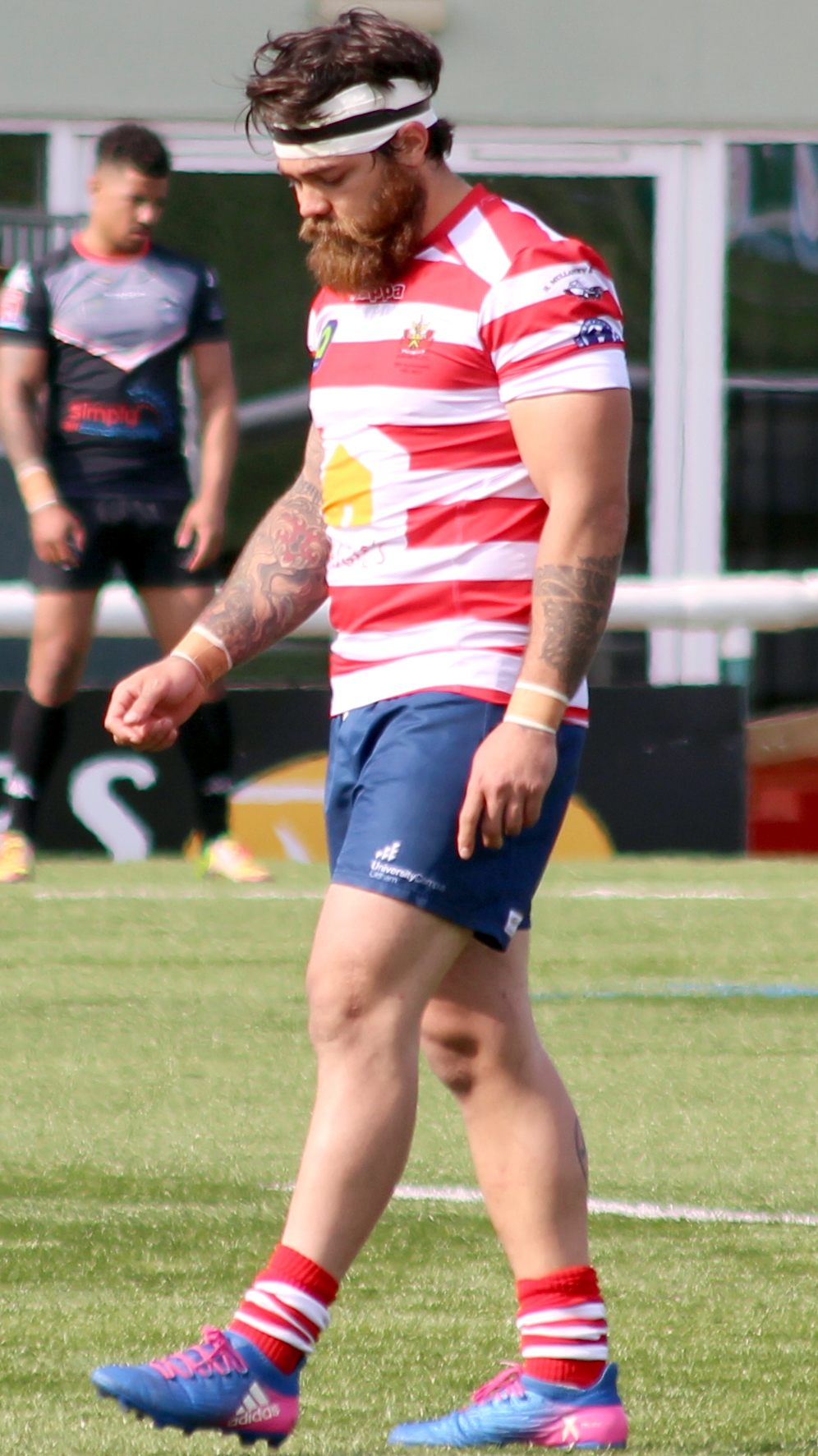

Personal information
- Born: 28 February 1987 (age 39) Wigan, Greater Manchester, England

Playing information
- Position: Hooker, Loose forward
Club
Years	Team	Pld	T	G	FG	P
2010–11	London Skolars	29	12	0	0	48
2012	Whitehaven	13	5	0	0	20
2013–17	Oldham	93	15	3	0	66
	Total	135	32	3	0	134
- Source: As of 27 October 2017
- Relatives: Ken Gee (grandfather); Samuel Gee (great grand-uncle)

Sam Gee (born 28 February 1987) is an English former professional rugby league footballer who last played for Oldham, as a hooker or loose forward.

== Early ==
Gee was born in Wigan, Greater Manchester, England.

== Career ==
Gee also played for the London Skolars and Whitehaven, during a seven-year professional career.

He is the grandson of former Wigan prop Ken Gee, and the great-nephew of former England rugby league footballer Sam Gee
