= Gordon Bonner =

British Lions international rugby union & rugby league footballer

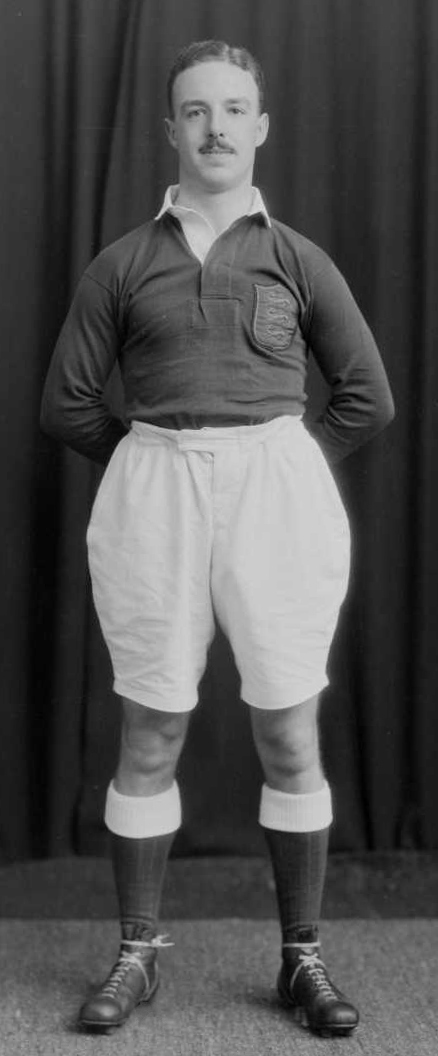
- Bonner in New Zealand in 1930
- Born: William Gordon MacGregor Bonner; 8 September 1907 Wakefield, England
- Died: 1 June 1985 (aged 77)
- School: Queen Elizabeth's Grammar School, Wakefield

Rugby union career
- Position: Fullback
Amateur team(s)
Years	Team	Apps	(Points)
- Bradford
International career
Years	Team	Apps	(Points)
1930	British and Irish Lions	0	(0)
- Rugby league career

Playing information
- Position: Fullback
Club
Years	Team	Pld	T	G	FG	P
1932–36	Wakefield Trinity	79				65
1937–39	Castleford	2				0
	Total	81	0	0	0	65

Gordon Bonner (1907-1985) was a rugby union international who was part of the British and Irish Lions team that toured New Zealand and Australia in 1930. He never represented England, and later changed code to play Rugby league.

== Early life ==
William Gordon MacGregor Bonner was born in 1907 in Wakefield, West Riding of Yorkshire. He was the son of Arthur Alexander Bonner, a cattle dealer and also magistrate for Wakefield. His father was also a prominent member of the Rugby League establishment, at one time being president of the Wakefield Trinity rugby league club, and also between 1936 and 1938 was chairman of the Rugby Football League Council.

William went on to be educated at Queen Elizabeth Grammar School, Wakefield.

== Rugby career ==
Bonner went on to play for Bradford and for Yorkshire as fullback. He played in ten of the matches on the toured New Zealand and Australia in 1930 at fullback. but he did not play in any of the tests. He scored two conversions during these games. Despite playing for the British team, he was never selected for England.

=== Rugby league club career ===
Gordon Bonner made his début for Wakefield Trinity during September 1932, as a full-back he played 79-matches, scoring 1-try, and 31-goals, for 65-points. He later played for Castleford.

== Personal life ==
William Bonner married Mary (née Wood) in August 1934.
