= Iorwerth Jones =

Wales international rugby union & league footballer

Personal information
- Full name: Iorwerth Jones
- Born: 3 April 1903; Loughor, Wales
- Died: 31 August 1983 (aged 80); Penclawdd, Wales

Playing information

Rugby union
- Position: Number Eight
Club
Years	Team	Pld	T	G	FG	P
≤1927–28	Llanelli RFC
Representative
Years	Team	Pld	T	G	FG	P
1927–28	Wales	5	0	0	0	0

Rugby league
Club
Years	Team	Pld	T	G	FG	P
1928	Leeds
- Source: scrum.com

Iorwerth Jones (3 April 1903 – 31 August 1983) was a Welsh rugby union, and professional rugby league footballer who played in the 1920s. He played representative level rugby union (RU) for Wales, and at club level for Llanelli RFC, as a number eight, and club level rugby league (RL) for Leeds.

== Background ==
Jones was born in Loughor, Wales, and he died aged 80 in Penclawdd, Wales.

== International honours ==
Iorwerth Jones won caps for Wales (RU) while at Llanelli RFC in 1927 against Australia, and in 1928 against England, Scotland, Ireland, and France.
