= 1930–31 Challenge Cup =

Rugby league competition

- Duration: 5 rounds
- Winners: Halifax
- Runners-up: York

The 1930–31 Challenge Cup was the 31st staging of rugby league's oldest knockout competition, the Challenge Cup.

== First round ==
Date	Team one	Score one	Team two	Score two
07 Feb	Bradford Northern	0	York	11
07 Feb	Broughton Rangers	19	Hull Kingston Rovers	0
07 Feb	Castleford	0	Hull FC	0
07 Feb	Dewsbury	2	Halifax	3
07 Feb	Featherstone Rovers	2	Swinton	7
07 Feb	Golden Lions	3	Bramley	7
07 Feb	Huddersfield	60	Brookland	2
07 Feb	Hunslet	11	Wakefield Trinity	0
07 Feb	Leigh	7	Leeds	24
07 Feb	Lindley	2	Rochdale Hornets	13
07 Feb	Oldham	20	Widnes	5
07 Feb	St Helens Recs	19	Barrow	11
07 Feb	St Helens	46	Keighley	4
07 Feb	Salford	16	Batley	3
07 Feb	Warrington	16	Wigan	12
07 Feb	Wigan Highfield	41	Featherstone Jrs	3
12 Feb	Hull FC	4	Castleford	5

== Second round ==
Date	Team one	Score one	Team two	Score two
21 Feb	Bramley	0	Oldham	11
21 Feb	Castleford	2	St Helens	8
21 Feb	Rochdale Hornets	7	Broughton Rangers	15
21 Feb	Salford	9	Leeds	0
21 Feb	Swinton	0	Halifax	2
21 Feb	Warrington	9	St Helens Recs	0
21 Feb	Wigan Highfield	13	Hunslet	12
21 Feb	York	13	Huddersfield	2

== Quarterfinals ==
Date	Team one	Score one	Team two	Score two
07 Mar	Broughton Rangers	7	St Helens	8
07 Mar	Halifax	2	Oldham	2
07 Mar	Wigan Highfield	3	Warrington	17
07 Mar	York	12	Salford	2
09 Mar	Oldham	2	Halifax	2
16 Mar	Halifax	5	Oldham	2

== Semifinals ==
Date	Team one	Score one	Team two	Score two
28 Mar	York	15	Warrington	5
28 Mar	Halifax	11	St Helens	2

=== Final ===
Halifax beat York 22-8 in the final at Wembley before a crowd of 40,368.

This was Halifax’s third Challenge Cup final win in four Cup final appearances.

To date this was the only Challenge Cup final appearance by York.

2 May 1931

Halifax	22 - 8	York
Tries: Bland, Ivor Davies, Higgins (2); Goals: Adams (4); DG Dick Davies	Report	Tries: Harold Thomas (2); Goals Pascoe

Wembley, London
Attendance: 40,368

FB	1	Dick Davies
RW	2	Fred Adams
RC	3	Alf Higgs
LC	4	Herbert Haigh
LW	5	Lawrence Higgins
SO	6	Ivor Davies
SH	7	Herbert Hanson
PR	8	Harry Bland
HK	9	Albert Rawnsley
PR	10	William Renton
SR	11	Dai Rees
SR	12	Ernest Norcliffe
LF	13	Albert Atkinson

FB	1	Edward Owen
RW	2	Harold Thomas
RC	3	Mel Rosser
LC	4	Jack Davies
LW	5	Billy Davies
SO	6	Billy Thomas
SH	7	Arthur Lloyd
PR	8	W. Davis
HK	9	E. Myers
PR	10	Dan Pascoe
SR	11	H. Davies
SR	12	G. Layhe
LF	13	W. Johnson
