= Charles Annable =

English rugby league footballer

- Ogden's Cigarette card featuring Charles Annable

Personal information
- Full name: Charles Annable
- Born: 30 November 1904; Hemsworth, Yorkshire,
- Died: 1957 (aged 52); Yorkshire, England

Playing information
- Height: 5 ft 6 in (1.68 m)
- Weight: 10 st 11 lb (68 kg)
- Position: Scrum-half
Club
Years	Team	Pld	T	G	FG	P
1924–31	Featherstone Rovers	196	29	2	0	91
1931–33	Castleford	30	1	0	0	3
	Total	226	30	2	0	94
Representative
Years	Team	Pld	T	G	FG	P
1929	Yorkshire	2	1	0	0	3

Charles "Charlie" Stuart Annable (30 November 1904 – 1957) was an English professional rugby league footballer who played in the 1920s and 1930s. He played at representative level for Yorkshire, and at club level for Featherstone Rovers, and Castleford, as a scrum-half.

== Personal life ==
Charlie Annable was born in Hemsworth, Yorkshire, to Charles, a coal miner, and Jane Annable. He married Clara Rhodes on 4 February 1928. In 1939, he was working as a bus driver in Stanley, Yorkshire. He died in Yorkshire, aged 52.

== Playing career ==
=== County honours ===
Charlie Annable won two caps for Yorkshire while at the Featherstone Rovers; during the 1928–29 season against Glamorgan and Monmouthshire, and during the 1929–30 season against Australia.

=== County League appearances ===
Charlie Annable played in Castleford's victory in the Yorkshire League during the 1932–33 season.

=== County Cup Final appearances ===
Charles Annable played scrum-half in Featherstone Rovers' 0-5 defeat by Leeds in the 1928 Yorkshire Cup Final during the 1928–29 season at Belle Vue, Wakefield on Saturday 24 November 1928.

=== Club career ===
Charles Annable made his début for the Featherstone Rovers on Saturday 27 September 1924, he broke his clavicle in November 1927 which kept him out of Featherstone Rovers' run to the Championship Final during the 1927–28 season, in 1931 he was sold to Castleford for £400 (based on increases in average earnings, this would be approximately £66,750 in 2013).

== Contemporaneous article extract ==
"C. Annable' Featherstone Rovers (Northern Rugby League.) "C. Annable has demonstrated to his club the value of local talent. He was born in Alverthorpe [sic] in Yorkshire, and as a youth he has time for development. He is an unorthodox worker of the scrum, for he is not merely content to get the ball but he kicks to touch to advantage, and at other times bursts round to receive a reverse pass. Though on the small side everything points to his receiving county honours."
