= Tommy Dingsdale =

England international rugby league footballer

Personal information
- Full name: Thomas Dingsdale
- Born: fourth ¼ 1900; Prescot, England
- Died: 30 May 1940 (aged 39); York, England

Playing information
- Position: Fullback
Club
Years	Team	Pld	T	G	FG	P
≤1923–≥28	St. Helens Recs
≤1936–≥36	York
	Total	0	0	0	0	0
Representative
Years	Team	Pld	T	G	FG	P
1924–31	Lancashire	11	0	20	0	40
1928	England	1	0	1	0	2

Thomas Dingsdale (fourth ¼ 1900 – 30 May 1940) was an English professional rugby league footballer who played in the 1920s and 1930s. He played at representative level for England, and at club level for St Helens Recs and York, as a fullback.

== Background ==
Tommy Dingsdale's birth was registered in Prescot, Lancashire, England, he died aged 39 in York County Hospital after being injured in a car crash.

== Playing career ==
=== International honours ===
Tommy Dingsdale won a cap for England while at St. Helens Recs in 1928 against Wales.

=== County Cup Final appearances ===
Tommy Dingsdale played fullback in St Helens Recs' 17-0 victory over Swinton in the 1923–24 Lancashire Cup Final during the 1923–24 season at Central Park, Wigan on Saturday 24 November 1923, and played fullback, and scored two goals in York' 9-2 victory over Wakefield Trinity in the 1936–37 Yorkshire Cup Final during the 1936–37 season at Headingley, Leeds on Saturday 17 October 1936.

== Genealogical Information ==
Tommy Dingsdale was the older brother of the rugby league footballer; William "Billy" Dingsdale, and the rugby league wing/centre who played in the 1920s for Warrington; Benjamin "Ben" Dingsdale (born c. 1908/1909 – death unknown).
