= John Lowe (rugby league) =

GB & England international rugby league footballer

Personal information
- Full name: John Lowe
- Born: unknown
- Died: unknown

Playing information
- Position: Hooker
Club
Years	Team	Pld	T	G	FG	P
	Wigan Highfield
1931–33	Leeds
	Total	0	0	0	0	0
Representative
Years	Team	Pld	T	G	FG	P
1932–33	England	2	0	0	0	0
1932	Great Britain	1	0	0	0	0

John Lowe (year of birth unknown – year of death unknown) was an English professional rugby league footballer who played in the 1930s. He played at representative level for Great Britain and England, and at club level for Leeds, as a hooker.

== Playing career ==
=== Club career ===
Lowe was signed by Leeds from Wigan Highfield in September 1931.

=== International honours ===
John Lowe won caps for England while at Leeds in 1932 against Wales, in 1933 against Other Nationalities, and won a cap for Great Britain while at Leeds in 1932 New Zealand.
