= Billy Thomas (rugby league) =

Wales international rugby league footballer

Personal information
- Full name: Willam Thomas
- Born: 1907 Wales
- Died: 1972 (aged 64–65)

Playing information

Rugby union
Club
| Years | Team | Pld | T | G | FG | P |
|---|---|---|---|---|---|---|
| ≤1931–≤31 | Swansea RFC |
Representative
| Years | Team | Pld | T | G | FG | P |
| ≤1931–≤31 | Crawshays RFC | ≥1 |

Rugby league
- Position: Stand-off, Scrum-half
Club
| Years | Team | Pld | T | G | FG | P |
|---|---|---|---|---|---|---|
| ≤1931–≥36 | York |
Representative
| Years | Team | Pld | T | G | FG | P |
| 1930 | Other Nationalities | 1 | 0 | 0 | 0 | 0 |
| 1931 | Wales | 1 | 0 | 0 | 0 | 0 |

Willam Thomas (1907 – 1972) was a Welsh rugby union and professional rugby league footballer who played in the 1930s. He played invitational level rugby union (RU) for Crawshays RFC, and at club level for Swansea RFC, and representative level rugby league (RL) for Wales, and at club level for York (captain), as a stand-off or scrum-half.

== Playing career ==
=== York ===
Billy Thomas played stand-off, and was the captain in York's 8–22 defeat by Halifax in the 1930–31 Challenge Cup Final during the 1930–31 season at Wembley Stadium, London on Saturday 2 May 1931, in front of a crowd of 40,368.

Billy Thomas played scrum-half in York's 9–2 victory over Wakefield Trinity in the 1936 Yorkshire Cup Final during the 1936–37 season at Headingley, Leeds on Saturday 17 October 1936.

=== International honours ===
Billy Thomas played stand-off in Wales' 18–23 defeat by England at Fartown Ground, Huddersfield on Wednesday 18 March 1931.
