= Jeff Moores =

Australian rugby league footballer

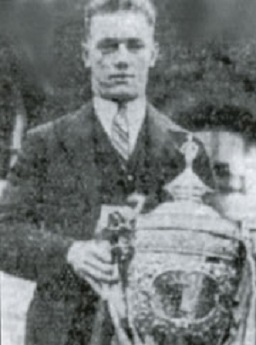

Personal information
- Born: c. 1906 Brisbane, Australia
- Died: 17 July 1989 (aged 83) Gympie, Queensland, Australia

Playing information
- Position: Centre, Stand-off
Club
Years	Team	Pld	T	G	FG	P
≤1925–27	Western Suburbs
1927–33	Leeds
1933–35	York
	Total	0	0	0	0	0
Representative
Years	Team	Pld	T	G	FG	P
1925–27	Queensland Firsts
1935	Rugby League XIII
1937	Dominion XIII

Jeff Moores (c. 1906 – 17 Jul 1989) was an Australian professional rugby league footballer who played in the 1920s and 1930s. He played at representative level for Queensland Firsts, Rugby League XIII and Dominion XIII, and at club level for Western Suburbs (Brisbane) (captain), Leeds and York, as a centre or stand-off.

== Playing career ==
=== International honours ===
Moores was a member of the RFL's England, Wales and Dominion selects team that claimed a 25–18 victory over France in Headingley on 6 May 1935, in celebration of King George V's Silver Jubilee.

=== Challenge Cup Final appearances ===
Jeff Moores played at centre in Leeds' 11–8 victory over Swinton in the 1931–32 Challenge Cup Final during the 1931–32 season at Central Park, Wigan, on Saturday 7 May 1932, in front of a crowd of 29,000.

=== County Cup Final appearances ===
Jeff Moores played, and scored two tries in Leeds' 8–0 victory over Wakefield Trinity in the 1932–33 Yorkshire Cup Final during the 1932–33 season at Fartown Ground, Huddersfield on Saturday 19 November 1932, played in York's 10–4 victory over Hull Kingston Rovers in the 1933–34 Yorkshire Cup Final during the 1933–34 season at Headingley, Leeds on Saturday 25 November 1933, and played in the 0–3 defeat by Leeds in the 1935–36 Yorkshire Cup Final during the 1935–36 season at Thrum Hall, Halifax on Saturday 19 October 1935.
