= 1930–31 Northern Rugby Football League season =

- League: Championship
- Duration: 38 Rounds
- Teams: 28
- Champions: Swinton (3rd title)
- League Leaders: Swinton
- Runners-up: Leeds
- Top point-scorer: (Wales) Jim Sullivan ( Wigan Warriors) (278)
- Top try-scorer: (Australia) Eric Harris ( Leeds) (58)

The 1930–31 Rugby Football League season was the 36th season of rugby league football.

== Season summary ==
Swinton won their third Championship when they defeated Leeds 14-7 in the play-off final. They had also finished the regular season as league leaders.

The Challenge Cup Winners were Halifax who beat York 22-8.

The format of the competition was changed so that all clubs played the same number of matches, and percentages were no longer required.

Swinton won the Lancashire League, and Leeds won the Yorkshire League. St Helens Recs beat Wigan 18–3 to win the Lancashire County Cup, and Leeds beat Huddersfield 10–2 to win the Yorkshire County Cup.

== Championship ==
| | Team | Pld | W | D | L | PF | PA | Pts |
|---|---|---|---|---|---|---|---|---|
| 1 | Swinton | 38 | 31 | 2 | 5 | 504 | 156 | 64 |
| 2 | Leeds | 38 | 29 | 1 | 8 | 695 | 258 | 59 |
| 3 | Wigan | 38 | 28 | 2 | 8 | 657 | 199 | 58 |
| 4 | Oldham | 38 | 27 | 4 | 7 | 464 | 178 | 58 |
| 5 | Huddersfield | 38 | 27 | 2 | 9 | 545 | 272 | 56 |
| 6 | Halifax | 38 | 25 | 3 | 10 | 405 | 283 | 53 |
| 7 | St. Helens | 38 | 25 | 1 | 12 | 502 | 344 | 51 |
| 8 | Hunslet | 38 | 24 | 2 | 12 | 523 | 278 | 50 |
| 9 | Salford | 38 | 23 | 3 | 12 | 420 | 256 | 49 |
| 10 | Warrington | 38 | 23 | 2 | 13 | 447 | 291 | 48 |
| 11 | York | 38 | 23 | 1 | 14 | 441 | 361 | 47 |
| 12 | St. Helens Recs | 38 | 21 | 2 | 15 | 436 | 243 | 44 |
| 13 | Hull Kingston Rovers | 38 | 21 | 0 | 17 | 345 | 399 | 42 |
| 14 | Wakefield Trinity | 38 | 20 | 0 | 18 | 510 | 438 | 40 |
| 15 | Wigan Highfield | 38 | 17 | 3 | 18 | 398 | 435 | 37 |
| 16 | Hull | 38 | 17 | 2 | 19 | 398 | 428 | 36 |
| 17 | Broughton Rangers | 38 | 15 | 5 | 18 | 376 | 366 | 35 |
| 18 | Dewsbury | 38 | 14 | 2 | 22 | 418 | 406 | 30 |
| 19 | Barrow | 38 | 12 | 6 | 20 | 350 | 481 | 30 |
| 20 | Castleford | 38 | 15 | 0 | 23 | 351 | 539 | 30 |
| 21 | Leigh | 38 | 11 | 3 | 24 | 248 | 479 | 25 |
| 22 | Widnes | 38 | 11 | 2 | 25 | 245 | 450 | 24 |
| 23 | Batley | 38 | 11 | 1 | 26 | 245 | 505 | 23 |
| 24 | Rochdale Hornets | 38 | 10 | 2 | 26 | 330 | 557 | 22 |
| 25 | Keighley | 38 | 8 | 0 | 30 | 242 | 705 | 16 |
| 26 | Featherstone Rovers | 38 | 7 | 1 | 30 | 265 | 486 | 15 |
| 27 | Bramley | 38 | 5 | 3 | 30 | 251 | 636 | 13 |
| 28 | Bradford Northern | 38 | 4 | 1 | 33 | 227 | 809 | 9 |

== Championship play-off ==
Semi-finals
1 | Swinton | 16
4 | Oldham | 3
2 | Leeds | 13
3 | Wigan | 0

Championship final
Swinton | 14
Leeds | 7

== Challenge Cup ==
Halifax beat York 22-8 in the final at Wembley before a crowd of 40,368.

This was Halifax’s third Challenge Cup final win in four Cup Final appearances.

To date this was the only Challenge Cup Final appearance by York.

== Sources ==
- 1930-31 Rugby Football League season at wigan.rlfans.com
- The Challenge Cup at The Rugby Football League website
