= Parkside, Hunslet =

Coordinates: 53.769610°N 1.542270°W

Parkside was a rugby league stadium in Hunslet, Leeds, England. It was home to Hunslet F.C. rugby league club and the source of their nickname, the Parksiders.

Hunslet now play at the South Leeds Stadium which is less than half a mile from the former site of Parkside.

== The stadium ==
Adjacent to the rugby pitch, there was a bowling green and a cricket ground. Parkside's surface had the reputation as being the best in the game and was often used by touring Australian teams as a training ground.

The Mother Benson's End was named after the old lady who washed the players' kit and lived in one of the Low Fold farm cottages which were situated at that end of the ground.

== History ==
Hunslet purchased at little cost 10.25 acres (41,500 m^{2}) of waste land at Hunslet Carr from the Low Moor Iron and Coal Company and had to shift 2,000 tons of rubbish to create what would become Parkside, which they moved to in 1888.

The first game at Parkside was played on 11 February 1888, when they played and beat Mirfield.

The stand from Woodhouse Hill was re-erected at Parkside. A pavilion was built in 1901.

In 1959 Hunslet Cricket Club left Parkside and the cricket pitch became Hunslet's training ground.

Parkside's stand was burned down by vandals in 1971. Parkside was sold off to an industrial developer for around £300,000 in 1972. The last game at Parkside was on 21 April 1973 against York. Hunslet F.C. was dissolved a few months afterwards. Parkside was demolished and New Hunslet became tenants at the Elland Road Greyhound Stadium.

== Rugby League Tour Matches ==
Other than Hunslet club games, Parkside also saw Hunslet play host to international touring teams from Australia (sometimes playing as Australasia) from 1908 to 1963.

Game	Date	Result	Attendance	Notes
1	7 November 1908	Hunslet F.C. drew with New Zealand 11–11		1907–08 All Golds tour
2	7 November 1908	Australia def. Hunslet F.C. 12–11	6,000	1908–09 Kangaroo tour
3	22 October 1911	Hunslet F.C. drew with Australasia 3–3	4,000	1911–12 Kangaroo tour
4	2 January 1922	Australasia def. Hunslet F.C. 19–10	3,174	1921–22 Kangaroo tour
5	25 December 1929	Hunslet F.C. def. Australia 18–3	12,000	1929–30 Kangaroo tour
6	18 October 1933	Australia def. Hunslet F.C. 22–18	6,227	1933–34 Kangaroo tour
7	22 October 1952	Australia def. Hunslet F.C. 49–2	3,273	1952–53 Kangaroo tour
8	21 November 1956	Australia def. Hunslet F.C. 27–11	4,451	1956–57 Kangaroo tour
9	5 December 1959	Australia def. Hunslet F.C. 12–11	8,061	1959–60 Kangaroo tour
10	23 October 1963	Australia def. Hunslet F.C. 17–14	4,400	1963–64 Kangaroo tour
