= List of Leeds Rhinos international players =

This is a List of Rugby League players earning international caps while playing for Leeds Rhinos, and also includes the period when the club was known as Leeds RLFC.

== Players ==
Name	Country	Debut	Against	Caps
Leslie Adams	England	1931	Wales	3
Leslie Adams	Great Britain	1932	Australia	1
John Atkinson	England	1968	Wales	12
John Atkinson	Great Britain	1968	France	26
Jim Bacon	Wales	1921		6
Jim Bacon	Great Britain	1920	Australia	11
Ryan Bailey	England	2006	France	4
Ryan Bailey	Great Britain	2004	Australia	4
Bob Barlett	(United Kingdom) British Empire XIII	1949	France	1
Bob Barlett	Other Nationalities	1949	England	2
Ray Batten	England	1968	Wales	3
Ray Batten	Great Britain	1969	France	3
John Bentley	England	1995	France	5
John Bentley	Great Britain	1992	France	2
John Birch	England	1908	Wales	1
John Birch	Great Britain	1908	New Zealand	1
Joe Brittain	England	1921	Wales	4
Andrew Broatch	Commonwealth XIII	1965	New Zealand	1
Stan Brogden	England	1929	Other Nationalities	13
Stan Brogden	Great Britain	1929	Australia	15
Jim Brough	England	1926	Wales	11
Jim Brough	Great Britain	1928	Australia	5
George Broughton	England	1924	Other Nationalities	1
Gordon Brown	Great Britain	1954	New Zealand	6
Rob Burrow	England	2004	Wales	8
Rob Burrow	Great Britain	2005	New Zealand	5

- Joe 'Chimpy' Busch won caps for Other Nationalities while at Leeds 1933 England

=== C ===
- Mark Calderwood won caps for England while at Leeds Rhinos 2004 France, Ireland, 2005 France, New Zealand, while at Wigan 2006 France, Tonga (2 matches)
- Garreth Carvell won caps for Wales while at Leeds Rhinos 2000(…2007?) 1(3?)-caps + 2-caps (sub), and won caps for Great Britain while at Hull in 2006 against New Zealand (2 matches)
- Michael "Mick" Clark won caps for Great Britain while at Leeds (World Cup 1968 3-caps)
- Terrence "Terry" Clawson won caps for Great Britain while at Leeds (World Cup 1972 3-caps, 10-goals)
- Arthur Clues won caps for Australia while at Wests 1946 3-caps, and won caps for Other Nationalities while at Leeds 1949…55 14-caps
- Gary Connolly won caps for England while at St. Helens 1992 Wales, while at Wigan 1995 Australia, 1996 France, Wales, and won caps for Great Britain while at St. Helens 1991 Papua New Guinea (sub), 1992 France (2 matches), Australia (sub) (2 matches), New Zealand (2 matches), Australia, 1993 France (2 matches), while at Wigan 1993 New Zealand (3 matches), 1994 France, Australia (3 matches), 1998 New Zealand (3 matches), 1999 Australia, New Zealand, 2001 France, Australia (3 matches), 2002 New Zealand (3 matches), while at Leeds Rhinos 2003 Australia (2 matches)
- Paul Cook won caps for England while at Leeds 1995 Fiji (sub), South Africa
- Philip "Phil" Cookson won caps for England while at Leeds 1975 New Zealand, Australia, Papua New Guinea
- David Creasser won caps for Great Britain while at Leeds in 1985 against France (2 matches), in 1987 against France, and in 1988 against France
- Lee Crooks won caps for England while at Castleford 1992 Wales, and won caps for Great Britain while at Hull F.C. 1982 Australia (2 matches), 1984 France (sub), Australia (2 matches), 1985 New Zealand, New Zealand (sub), 1986 France (2 matches), Australia (3 matches), 1987 France, while at Leeds 1989 France, while at Castleford 1992 France (2 matches), Papua New Guinea, Australia, 1994 France
- Francis Cummins won caps for England while at Leeds 1995 France, and won caps for Great Britain while at Leeds Rhinos 1998 New Zealand (2 matches), 1999 New Zealand

=== D ===
- Idwal Davies won a cap for Wales while at Leeds 1945 1-cap
- William A. Davies won caps for Wales while at Leeds in 1914, and 1921, and won caps for Great Britain in 1914 against Australia, and New Zealand
- Roy Dickinson won caps for Great Britain while at Leeds in 1985 against France (2 matches)
- Matt Diskin won caps for England while at Leeds Rhinos 2006 France, Tonga, Samoa, and won caps for Great Britain while at Leeds Rhinos 2004 New Zealand
- Harry Dyer won caps for England while at Leeds 1939 Wales
- Leslie "Les" Dyl won caps for England while at Leeds 1975 France, Wales, France, Wales, New Zealand, New Zealand (sub), Australia (2 matches), Papua New Guinea, 1977 Wales, France, 1978 France, Wales, 1981 Wales, and won caps for Great Britain while at Leeds 1974 Australia (2 matches), New Zealand (3 matches), 1977 France, New Zealand, Australia (2 matches), 1978 Australia, 1982 Australia

=== E ===
- Gareth Ellis
- Candy Evans won caps for Wales (RU) while at Pontypool RFC in the 1924 Five Nations Championship against England, Ireland, and France, won caps for Wales (RL) while at Halifax, Leeds, Castleford in the 19-23 defeat by England at Fartown Ground, Huddersfield on 18 March 1931, and Warrington 1928…1933 4-caps,
- Cliff Evans won caps for Wales while at Leeds 1936…1941 7-caps
- Colin Evans won caps for Wales while at Leeds, and Keighley 1963…1969 2-caps
- William Evans won caps for Wales while at Leeds 1912…1913 2-caps
- Richard Eyres won caps for England while at Widnes in 1992 against Wales, won caps for Wales while at Leeds, and Swinton 1995…1999 7(8, 9?)-caps + 1-cap (sub), and won caps for Great Britain while at Widnes in 1989 against France (sub), in 1991 against France, and France (sub), in 1992 against France (sub), and Australia (sub), in 1993 against France (2 matches), and while at Leeds in 1993 against New Zealand (sub) (2 matches)

=== F ===
- Anthony Farrell won caps for England while at Sheffield 1995 Wales, while at Leeds Rhinos 1999 France (2 matches), won caps for Wales while at Leeds, and Widnes 2000…2003 8(7?)-caps 1-try 4-points
- Charles Fernandes, won caps for England (RU) while at Leeds in 1891 against Ireland, Wales, and Scotland
- Tony Fisher won caps for Wales while at Bradford Northern in 1970 against England, while at Leeds in the 1975 Rugby League World Cup against France, England, Australia, New Zealand, while at Castleford in the 1975 Rugby League World Cup against England, Australia, and New Zealand, and in 1977 against England, and France, and while at ? in 1978 against Australia, and won caps for Great Britain while at Bradford/Leeds in 1970 against Australia (2 matches), New Zealand (3 matches), and Australia (2 matches), while at Leeds in 1971 against France (2 matches), and in 1978 against Australia (2 matches) (World Cup 1970 2-caps) (World Cup 1975 6-caps, 1-try)
- Darren Fleary won caps for England while at Leeds Rhinos 2000 Australia (sub), Russia, New Zealand (sub), and won caps for Great Britain while at Leeds Rhinos 1998 New Zealand, New Zealand (sub)
- Philip "Phil" Ford won caps for Wales while at Warrington, Leeds, and Salford 1984 to 1995 1984(1991?)…1995 9(10?)-caps + 1-cap (sub) 4-tries 16-points
- Henry Fowler won a cap for England (RU) while at Leeds in 1877 against Ireland

=== G ===
- Frank Gallagher won caps for England while at Batley 1923 Other Nationalities, 1924 Other Nationalities, 1925 Wales (2 matches), 1926 Wales, Other Nationalities, 1927 Wales, while at Leeds 1928 Wales, and won caps for Great Britain while at Dewsbury 1920 Australia (3 matches), 1921-22 Australia, while at Batley 1924 Australia (3 matches), New Zealand (3 matches), 1926-27 New Zealand (2 matches)
- Richard "Dick" Gemmell won caps for Great Britain while at Leeds in 1964 against France, while at Hull F.C. in 1968 against France, and in 1969 against France
- Ashley Gibson won caps for England while at Leeds Rhinos 2006 France, Tonga (2 matches), Samoa
- Bernard Gould won caps for Wales while at Leeds and Wakefield Trinity 1921…1923 3-caps
- Ashton Golding won caps for Jamaica while at Leeds Rhinos 2017 France.
- Bobbie Goulding won caps for England while at St. Helens 1995 Fiji, South Africa, Wales, Australia, 1996 Wales, and won caps for Great Britain while at Wigan 1990 Papua New Guinea (2 matches), New Zealand (3 matches), while at Leeds 1992 France, while at St. Helens 1994 Australia, Australia (sub) (2 matches), 1996 Papua New Guinea, Fiji, New Zealand (3 matches), 1997 ASL (3 matches)
- Jeff Grayshon won caps for England while at Dewsbury 1975 Wales, France, New Zealand, Australia, Australia, 1977 Wales, while at Bradford Bulls 1979 Wales, France, 1980 w, France, 1981 Wales, and won caps for Great Britain while at 1979 Australia (2 matches), New Zealand (3 matches), 1980 New Zealand (2 matches), 1981 France (2 matches), 1982 Australia (2 matches), while at Leeds 1985 New Zealand (2 matches)
- Elwyn Gwyther represented Wales XV (RU) while at Llanelli RFC in the 'Victory International' non-Test match(es) between December 1945 and April 1946, and won caps for Wales (RL) while at Belle Vue Rangers, and Leeds 1947…1953 15-caps, and won caps for Great Britain (RL) while at Belle Vue Rangers in 1947 against New Zealand (2 matches), in 1950 against Australia (3 matches), and in 1951 against New Zealand

=== H ===
- Bob Haigh won caps for England while at Wakefield Trinity 1969 Wales, France, 1970 Wales, and won caps for Great Britain while at Wakefield Trinity 1968 Australia, France, while at Leeds 1970 New Zealand, Australia (sub), 1971 France, New Zealand (World Cup 1968 2-caps, 1970 2-caps)
- Ryan Hall won caps for England against France in June 2009
- Derek Hallas won caps for Great Britain while at Leeds in 1961 against France, and New Zealand
- Ellery Hanley won caps for England while at Bradford Bulls 1984 Wales, while at Leeds 1992 Wales, and won caps for Great Britain while at Bradford Bulls 1984 France (sub), France, Australia (3 matches), New Zealand (3 matches), Papua New Guinea, 1985 France (2 matches), while at Wigan 1985 New Zealand (3 matches), 1986 France, Australia, 1987 France (2 matches), Papua New Guinea, 1988 France (2 matches), Papua New Guinea, Australia (3 matches), New Zealand, 1989 France (2 matches), 1990 France, Australia (3 matches), 1991 France (2 matches), while at Leeds 1992 Australia, 1993 France
- Frederick "Fred" Harris won caps for England while at Leigh 1934 Australia, Leeds 1937 France
- Iestyn Harris won caps for Wales while at Warrington, while at Leeds, while at Bradford Bulls 1994…present 19-caps 8-tries 60-goals 142-points, and won caps for Great Britain while at Warrington, while at Leeds, while at Bradford Bulls ≥1995 12-caps won caps for Wales RU while at Cardiff Blues 2001…04 ?-caps
- Frederick "Fred" Harrison won caps for England while at Leeds 1911 Australia, 1912 Wales, 1913 Wales, and won caps for Great Britain while at Leeds 1911-12 Australia (3 matches)
- Michael "Mick" Harrison won caps for England while at Leeds 1978 France, Wales, and won caps for Great Britain while at Hull F.C. 1967 France (2 matches), 1971 New Zealand (2 matches), 1972 France (2 matches), 1973 Australia
- Andy Hay won caps for England while at Leeds Rhinos 2000 Russia, Fiji, New Zealand (sub), and won caps for Great Britain while at Leeds Rhinos 1999 Australia (sub), New Zealand (sub)
- David Heron won caps for Great Britain while at Leeds in 1982 against Australia (sub), and Australia
- John Holmes won caps for England while at Leeds 1975 Wales, France, New Zealand, Australia, 1977 Wales, France (sub), 1978 France (sub), and won caps for Great Britain while at Leeds 1971 New Zealand, 1972 France (2 matches), Australia, Australia (sub), New Zealand, 1977 France, New Zealand, Australia, Australia (sub), 1978 Australia (sub) (3 matches), 1979 Australia (2 matches), Australia (sub), New Zealand (3 matches), 1982 Australia (World Cup 1972 3-caps, 2-tries, 10-goals)
- William "Bill" Hopper won a cap for Wales while at Leeds 1953 1-cap
- Harvey Howard won caps for England while at Leeds 1995 Wales, while at Brisbane 2000 Australia, Russia (sub), Fiji (sub), Ireland (sub), New Zealand, and won caps for Great Britain while at Bradford Bulls 1998 New Zealand (sub)
- Sydney "Syd" Hynes won caps for England while at Leeds 1969 Wales, France, 1970 Wales, France, and won caps for Great Britain while at Leeds 1970 Australia (2 matches), New Zealand (2 matches), New Zealand (sub), Australia (2 matches), France, New Zealand, 1971 France, 1973 Australia (3 matches) (World Cup 1970 4-caps, 2-tries, 2-drop goals)

=== I ===
- Kevin Iro won caps for New Zealand while at Leeds 1995 ?-caps
- Iorwerth 'Iorrie' Isaacs won caps for Wales while at Leeds 1933…1935 2-caps

=== J ===
- Lee Jackson won caps for England while at Hull F.C. 1992 Wales, while at Sheffield 1995 France, Australia (2 matches), Fiji, Wales, while at Leeds Rhinos 1999 France (sub) (2 matches), and won caps for Great Britain while at Hull F.C. 1990 Papua New Guinea (2 matches), New Zealand, Australia (3 matches), 1991 France (2 matches), 1992 France, New Zealand (2 matches), while at Sheffield 1993 New Zealand (2 matches), 1994 France, Australia (3 matches)
- William "Billy" Jarman won caps for Great Britain while at Leeds in 1914 against Australia (2 matches)
- David Jeanes won caps for Great Britain while at Leeds (World Cup 1972 3-caps, 1-try)
- David "Dai" Jenkins won caps for Wales while at Leeds in 1938…1948 17-caps, and won a cap for Great Britain while at Leeds in 1947 against New Zealand
- Joseph "Joe" Jones won a cap for Wales (RU) while at Swansea in 1924, and won a cap for Wales (RL) while at Leeds in 1926
- Lewis Jones won a cap for Wales while at Leeds in 1953, and won caps for Great Britain while at Leeds (World Cup 1957 3-caps, 1-try, 10-goals)
- Jamie Jones-Buchanan won caps for England while at Leeds Rhinos 2005 France, New Zealand (sub), 2006 France, Tonga (2 matches), and won caps for Great Britain while at Leeds Rhinos 2007 New Zealand (sub)
- Kenneth "Ken" Jubb won caps for England while at Leeds 1933 Australia, 1938 Wales, 1941 Wales, 1943 Wales, and won caps for Great Britain while at Leeds 1937 Australia (2 matches)

=== K ===
- Tony Kemp won caps for New Zealand while at Leeds 1995 ?-caps

=== L ===
- T. D. Llewellyn (#3) won caps for Other Nationalities while at Leeds 1904 England
- John Lowe won caps for England while at Leeds 1932 Wales, 1933 Other Nationalities, and won caps for Great Britain while at Leeds 1932 New Zealand

=== M ===
- Dennis Madden won caps for Wales while at Acton & Willesden, Huddersfield, and Leeds 7-caps 1935…1939
- George Mann won caps for Tonga while at Leeds 1995 ?-caps
- Richard Mathers won caps for England while at Leeds Rhinos 2005 France, New Zealand
- Barrie McDermott won caps for England while at Leeds Rhinos 1996 Wales, and won caps for Great Britain while at Wigan 1994 Australia, Australia (sub) (2 matches), while at Leeds Rhinos 1999 Australia, New Zealand, 2001 France, Australia (3 matches), 2002 Australia, New Zealand (2 matches), 2003 Australia, Australia (sub) (2 matches)
- Robert "Bob" McMaster (#8) won caps for Australia RU while at Team? 1946 New Zealand ?-caps won caps for Other Nationalities while at Leeds circa-1948…52 ?-caps
- James "Jim" G. Moffatt (No. 9) won caps for Other Nationalities while at Leeds 1904 England
- Steve Molloy won caps for England while at Leeds 1992 Wales, while at Featherstone Rovers 1996 France (sub), Wales, while at Sheffield 1999 France (2 matches), and won caps for Great Britain while at Leeds 1993 France, while at Featherstone Rovers 1994 France, 1996 Fiji (sub), New Zealand (sub)
- Adrian Morley won caps for England while at Leeds Rhinos 1996 France (sub), 2000 Australia, Ireland, and won caps for Great Britain while at Leeds Rhinos 1996 New Zealand (sub) (2 matches), 1997 ASL (sub) (2 matches), ASL, 1999 Australia, New Zealand, 2002 while at Sydney New Zealand (2 matches), 2003 Australia (3 matches), 2004 Australia (3 matches), New Zealand (2 matches), 2005 Australia (2 matches), New Zealand, New Zealand (sub), 2006 New Zealand (3 matches), Australia (sub) (2 matches), while at Warrington 2007 France, New Zealand (3 matches)
- Oliver Morris won caps for Wales while at Hunslet, and Leeds 1938…1941 5-caps
- Cornelius "Con" Dennis Murphy won caps for Wales while at Leeds 1939…1944 5-caps

=== N ===
- Terry Newton won caps for England while at Leeds Rhinos 1999 France (2 matches), while at Wigan 2001 Wales, and won caps for Great Britain while at Leeds Rhinos 1998 New Zealand, while at Wigan 2002 Australia (sub), 2003 Australia (3 matches), 2004 Australia (3 matches), New Zealand, while at Bradford Bulls 2006 New Zealand (2 matches), New Zealand (sub), Australia (2 matches), 2007 New Zealand

=== O ===
- Hefin O'Hare won caps for Wales while at Leeds, and Huddersfield 2000…2004 7(8?)-caps + 1-cap (sub) 2-tries 8-points
- Ike Owens won caps for Wales while at Leeds, Castleford and Huddersfield 1945…1949 12-caps, and won caps for Great Britain while at Leeds in 1946 against Australia (3 matches), and New Zealand

=== P ===
- Jamie Peacock won caps for England while at Bradford Bulls 2000 Russia, Fiji, Ireland (sub), New Zealand (sub), 2001 Wales, and won caps for Great Britain while at Bradford Bulls 2001 Australia (2 matches), Australia (sub), 2002 Australia, New Zealand, New Zealand (sub) (2 matches), 2003 Australia (3 matches), 2004 Australia (3 matches), New Zealand, 2005 Australia (2 matches), New Zealand (2 matches), while at Leeds Rhinos 2006 New Zealand (3 matches), Australia (2 matches), 2007 New Zealand (3 matches)
- Stephen "Steve" Pitchford won caps for Great Britain while at Leeds in the 1977 Rugby League World Cup against France, New Zealand, and Australia (2 matches)
- Bernard Poole won caps for England while at Leeds 1950 France
- Roy Powell won caps for Great Britain while at Leeds 13+6-caps 1985-91
- Karl Pratt won caps for England while at Leeds Rhinos 2001 Wales, and won caps for Great Britain while at Leeds Rhinos 2002 Australia, New Zealand
- Gareth Price won caps for Wales while at Leeds 1945…1948 11-caps
- Dai Prosser won caps for Wales (RU) while at Glynneath RFC in 1934 against Scotland, and Ireland, won caps for Wales (RL) while at York, and Leeds 1936…1944 8-caps, and won a cap for Great Britain (RL) while at Leeds in 1937 against Australia at Fartown Ground, Huddersfield

=== R ===
- Albert Raymond 'Dicky' Ralph won caps for Wales while at Leeds 1933 1-cap
- Bill Ramsey won caps for Great Britain while at Hunslet 1965 New Zealand (2 matches), 1966 France, Australia (2 matches), New Zealand (2 matches), while at Leeds 1974 New Zealand
- Keith Rayne won caps for England while at Wakefield Trinity 1980 Wales, France, and won caps for Great Britain while at Leeds 1984 France (2 matches), Australia, Papua New Guinea
- Bev Risman won caps for Great Britain while at Leeds (World Cup 1968 Captain 3-caps, 10-goals)
- Donald "Don" Robinson won caps for England while at Wakefield Trinity 1951 France, 1955 Other Nationalities, while at Leeds 1956 France, and won caps for Great Britain while at Wakefield Trinity 1954 France (2 matches), New Zealand, Australia, 1955 New Zealand, while at Leeds 1956 Australia (2 matches), 1959 Australia (2 matches), 1960 France (World Cup 1954 4-caps)
- David Rose won caps for Great Britain while at Leeds 1954 Australia, France, New Zealand, France (World Cup 1954 4-caps 4-tries)
- Mel Rosser won caps for Wales (RU) while at Penarth RFC in 1924 against Scotland, and France, and won caps for Wales (RL) while at Leeds in 1926 against England, in 1930 against Australia, and while at York in 1931 against England, in 1932 against England, and in 1933 against Australia

=== S ===
- Marcus St Hilaire won caps for England while at Leeds Rhinos 1999 France (2 matches)
- Garry Schofield won caps for England while at Hull F.C. 1984 Wales, while at Leeds 1992 Wales, 1995 Wales, and won caps for Great Britain while at Hull F.C. 1984 France, Australia (3 matches), New Zealand, 1985 New Zealand (3 matches), 1986 France (2 matches), Australia (3 matches), 1987 France (2 matches), while at Leeds 1988 France (2 matches), Papua New Guinea, Australia, 1990 France (2 matches), Papua New Guinea (2 matches), New Zealand (3 matches), Australia (3 matches), 1991 France (2 matches), Papua New Guinea, 1992 Papua New Guinea, Australia (3 matches), New Zealand (2 matches), Australia, 1993 France, New Zealand (3 matches), 1994 France, Australia (sub) (2 matches)
- Nick Scruton won caps for England while at Leeds Rhinos 2004 Russia (sub), France (sub), Ireland (sub), 2006 France (sub), Tonga (sub) (2 matches), Samoa
- Barry Seabourne won caps for England while at Leeds 1970 Wales, France, and won caps for Great Britain while at 1970 New Zealand
- Keith Senior won caps for England while at Leeds Rhinos 2000 Australia, Russia, Ireland, New Zealand, 2001 Wales, and won caps for Great Britain while at Sheffield 1996 Fiji (sub), New Zealand (sub), 1998 New Zealand (3 matches), while at Leeds Rhinos 1999 Australia, New Zealand, 2001 Australia (3 matches), 2002 Australia, New Zealand (3 matches), 2003 Australia (2 matches), 2004 Australia (3 matches), New Zealand (2 matches), 2005 Australia (2 matches), New Zealand (2 matches), 2006 New Zealand (3 matches), Australia (2 matches), 2007 New Zealand (3 matches)
- Michael "Mick" Shoebottom won caps for England while at Leeds 1968 Wales, 1969 France (sub), 1970 Wales, France, and won caps for Great Britain while at Leeds 1968 Australia, New Zealand (sub), 1969 France, 1970 Australia (2 matches), Australia (sub), New Zealand, 1970 Australia (2 matches), France, New Zealand, 1971 France (World Cup 1968 2-caps 1-try, 1970 4-caps)
- Barry Simms won a cap for Great Britain while at Leeds in 1962 against France
- Kevin Sinfield won caps for England while at Leeds Rhinos 2000 Australia (sub), Russia, Fiji (sub), 2001 Wales, and won caps for Great Britain while at Leeds Rhinos 2001 France, Australia (2 matches), Australia (sub), 2002 Australia (sub), New Zealand, New Zealand (sub), 2003 Australia (sub) (2 matches), 2005 New Zealand, Australia, Australia (sub), 2007 France (sub), New Zealand
- Alan Smith won caps for England while at Leeds 1968 Wales, 1970 Wales, France, and won caps for Great Britain while at Leeds 1970 Australia (2 matches), New Zealand (3 matches), 1970 Australia (2 matches), 1971 France (2 matches), 1973 Australia (World Cup 1970 2-caps)
- David Smith won caps for England while at Wakefield Trinity 1975 Australia, while at Leeds 1977 France
- Lee Smith won caps for England while at Leeds Rhinos 2006 France, Tonga, Tonga (sub), Samoa (sub)
- Stanley "Stan" Smith won caps for England while at Leeds 1931 Wales, 1932 Wales (2 matches), 1934 Australia, France, 1935 France, and won caps for Great Britain while at Wakefield Trinity 1929-30 Australia, while at Leeds 1929-30 Australia (2 matches), 1932 Australia (3 matches), New Zealand (3 matches), 1933 Australia (2 matches)
- Paul Sterling won a cap for England while at Leeds in 1999 against France, and won caps for Wales while at Leeds Rhinos 2000(…2001?) 5-caps 2-tries 8-points
- Jeffrey "Jeff" Stevenson won caps for Great Britain while at Leeds 1955 New Zealand (3 matches), 1956 Australia (3 matches), 1957 France (4 matches), Australia, New Zealand, France (2 matches), 1958 France, while at York City Knights 1959 Australia (2 matches), 1960 France (2 matches) (World Cup 1957 3-caps 1-try).
- Squire Stockwell won caps for Great Britain while at Leeds in 1920 against Australia, and in 1921 against Australia (2 matches)

=== T ===
- Edward "Ted" Tattersfield won caps for England while at Leeds 1940 Wales, 1941 Wales, 1943 Wales, 1944 Wales
- Lewis Taylor won a cap for Wales while at Leeds Rhinos in the 22-30 defeat by Scotland at Firhill Stadium, Glasgow on Wednesday 24 November 2004
- Abe Terry won caps for Great Britain while at St. Helens in 1958 against Australia (two matches), in 1959 against France (2 matches), and Australia (3 matches), in 1960 against France, in 1961 against France (2 matches), and while at Leeds in 1962 against France
- Arthur Thomas won caps for England while at Leeds 1926 Other Nationalities, 1930 Other Nationalities, 1931 Wales, and won caps for Great Britain while at Leeds 1926-27 New Zealand (2 matches), 1929-30 Australia (2 matches)
- Philip "Phil" Thomas won caps for Wales while at Leeds, and Hull Kingston Rovers 4-caps 1908…1911, and won a cap for Great Britain while at Leeds in 1908 against New Zealand
- Joseph "Joe" Thompson Joe Thompson won a cap for Wales (RU) while at Cross Keys RFC in 1923 against England, won caps for Wales (RL) while at Leeds 8-caps, won caps for Other Nationalities(RL) while at Leeds 5-caps, and won caps for Great Britain (RL) while at Leeds in 1924 against Australia, and New Zealand (2 matches), in 1928 against Australia, and New Zealand, in 1929 against Australia, and in 1932 against Australia (3 matches), and New Zealand (3 matches)
- Andrew "Drew" Turnbull won a cap for Great Britain while at Leeds in 1951 against New Zealand, and also represented Great Britain while at Leeds between 1952 and 1956 against France (1 non-Test match)

=== W ===
- Hugh Waddell won caps for England while at Blackpool Borough 1984 Wales, and won caps for Great Britain while at Oldham 1988 France (2 matches), Australia, New Zealand, while at Leeds 1989 France
- Chev Walker won caps for England while at Leeds Rhinos 2000 Australia, Russia, Fiji (sub), Ireland, New Zealand, 2001 Wales, and won caps for Great Britain while at Leeds Rhinos 2004 Australia (sub), New Zealand (sub), 2005 Australia (sub) (2 matches), New Zealand (sub) (2 matches)
- Sydney "Syd" Walmsley won caps for England while at Leeds 1923 Wales, 1924 Wales
- William "Billy" Ward won caps for England while at Leeds 1910 Wales, 1911 Australia, and won caps for Great Britain while at Leeds 1910 Australia
- David Ward won caps for England while at Leeds 1977 France, 1980 Wales, France, 1981 France, Wales (2 matches), and won caps for Great Britain while at Leeds 1977 France, New Zealand, Australia, 1978 Australia, 1979 Australia (3 matches), New Zealand (3 matches), 1981 France, 1982 Australia
- Emlyn Watkins won caps for Wales (RU) while at Blaina RFC in 1926 against Scotland, Ireland, and France, and won cap(s) for Wales (RL) while at Leeds 1926(1927) 3(1)-caps
- Alfred "Alf" Watson won a cap for England while at Leeds in 1938 against Wales
- Frederick "Fred" Webster won caps for England while at Leeds 1906 Other Nationalities, 1910 Wales (2 matches), 1911 Wales, and won caps for Great Britain while at Leeds 1910 Australia (2 matches), New Zealand
- Daniel "Danny" Williams won caps for England while at Leeds Rhinos 2006 France, Samoa
- Richard "Dickie" Williams won caps for Wales while at between Leeds 1947…1953 13-caps, also won caps for Great Britain while at Leeds between 1948…1954 12-caps, and also represented Great Britain while at Hunslet between 1952 and 1956 against France (1 non-Test match)
- Harry Woods won caps for England while at Liverpool Stanley 1935 France, Wales, while at Leeds 1937 France, and won caps for Great Britain while at Liverpool Stanley 1936 Australia (3 matches), New Zealand (2 matches), Leeds 1937 Australia
- Geoffrey "Geoff" Wriglesworth won caps for Great Britain while at Leeds in 1965 against New Zealand, and in 1966 against Australia (2 matches), and New Zealand (2 matches)

=== Y ===
- Frank Young won caps for Wales while at Leeds in 1909 against England, and in 1910, and won a cap for Great Britain while at Leeds in 1909 against Australia
