= 1941–42 Northern Rugby Football League Wartime Emergency League season =

British wartime rugby league season

- League: Northern Rugby League
- Teams: 17

1941–42 Season
- Champions: Dewsbury
- Runner-up: Bradford Northern

The 1941–42 Northern Rugby Football Union season was the third season of the rugby league’s Wartime Emergency League necessitated by the Second World War. With fewer clubs than the previous season the Rugby Football League (RFL) decided to amalgamate the two county leagues (Yorkshire and Lancashire) into one joint league. The season started with 18 clubs but finished with 17 after Broughton Rangers withdrew in January 1942. The single division championship was won by Dewsbury, who had finished the season in first position and then defeated Bradford Northern in the play-off final.

The Challenge Cup was won by Leeds while Bradford Northern won the Yorkshire Cup, the Lancashire Cup was not played.

== Pre-season developments ==
The RFL annual general meeting was held on 11 June 1941 and with four clubs confirming that they would not enter the league for 1941–42 and a further five unsure about participating, the RFL indicated that a single division championship would be played. The clubs confirming that they would not be playing were Salford, Warrington (both of whom had withdrawn from the league part way through the previous season), Widnes and Rochdale Hornets (neither of which had entered the previous season). The five unconfirmed teams were Hull Kingston Rovers, Barrow (neither of which had entered the previous season), Leigh, Liverpool Stanley and Broughton Rangers (who had filled the bottom three places in the previous season's Lancashire league).

The Rugby League Council confirmed the decision to have a single league at its meeting at the end of July. By the time of the council meeting on 31 July three of the five undecided teams confirmed that they would not be participating, Hull Kingston Rovers, Barrow and Liverpool Stanley. Broughton Rangers decided to play while Leigh were still undecided. Among the Yorkshire clubs, Hull F.C. and Castleford still had to confirm their places. While Hull and Castleford confirmed their continued entry, the RFL declined Leigh's application. Leigh had vacated their Mather Lane and moved into the ground of Hindsford AFC, the RFL did not consider that the Hindsford ground was good enough for first class matches. Leigh appealed the decision but the appeal was refused as the ground wasn't of the required standard and the club had not submitted their original application until after the fixtures for the season had already been arranged.

The league therefore comprised the 14 teams from Yorkshire who had competed in 1940-41 and four from Lancashire; Broughton Rangers, Wigan, Oldham and St Helens.

In other developments, the RFL announced that players of non-playing clubs were entitled to play for other teams under the guest rules introduced in the first season of the war, without any payment being paid to the parent club. Three representative games were also planned; an international between England and Wales, a Lancashire v Yorkshire game, and a Rugby League XIII against a Services XIII.

== League season ==
The season began on 6 September 1941 with a full programme of fixtures.

The early part of the season passed smoothly although in October there were concerns that illegal payments were being made to players to induce them to make guest appearances for other clubs. The most notable of these involved former Great Britain captain Jim Sullivan who was alleged to have received illegal payments from Dewsbury to play for the Yorkshire club rather than his registered club, Wigan. The investigation found no proof of such payments being made but did censure Sullivan for demanding more than the 25s maximum match fee from Wigan.

Until the end of October there were no problems but towards the beginning of the following month, Broughton Rangers, started cancelling matches and later the matter was referred to the RFL. With the club declining to play any matches over the Christmas period they RFL held further discussions and in early January 1942 Broughton resigned from the competition and their results to that date were expunged from the league table.

In December 1941 concerns began to be raised that teams would not all play the same number of games and suggestions appeared that the league table should be based on win percentages rather than competition points of two points for a win and one point for a draw. Changes in petrol rationing also imposed additional pressures on clubs in arranging travel to away games. The basic ration for non-essential travel was cut twice during 1941 and permits were required for long coach trips leading to players having to commit long hours to getting to and from matches. The Yorkshire Evening Post detailed the journeys of York and Hull travelling to St Helens and Wigan respectively on the opening day of the season, with the teams leaving their home towns at 9 am and not getting home until after midnight.

Over the following weeks the discussion continued with the Dewsbury club, voicing their opposition to the suggestion on the grounds that it would cost them the title at that time; mid-January 1942. The RFL made no immediate decision but the weather at the end of January and into February saw numerous cancellations e.g. the entire programme on 31 January and 6 February was postponed, and by the end of February the backlog of postponed games totalled 150. It was in March 1942 that the RFL decided that league placing would be based on win percentages and that the title of champions would be decided after a two round play-off involving the top four teams.

The same meeting in March also decided that the final would be played on 18 April 1942 and that guest players would only be eligible to appear in the play-off games if they had played at least four matches during the season for the club they were guesting for.

To ensure the final was played on 18 April, the RFL announced that the four teams at the top of the league table on 6 April (Easter Monday) would be the four going forward to the play-off semi-finals although matches continued to be played until May, for example Huddersfield didn't play Dewsbury until 9 May. The number of games played by each club varied between 17 and 24 and while Dewsbury won 19 and drew 1 of their 24, luckless Bramley lost all 19 matches played.

After the matches on 6 April, the top four teams (in order) were Dewsbury, Bradford Northern, Halifax and Hull. The semi-finals were played the following Saturday where Dewsbury beat Hull 32–18 while Bradford beat Halifax 15–8. The final was played at Headingley, Leeds on Saturday 18 April saw Dewsbury crowned champions with a 13-0 win over Bradford Northern.

Discipline during the season was reasonable but there were exceptions. Mel De Lloyd, a Warrington player playing as a guest for Keighley was banned indefinitely for dissent towards and assaulting the referee during Keighley's game against Hull in January 1942. (Note: De Lloyd's sine die suspension was subsequently lifted in October 1942.)

=== League table ===
Pos	Team	Pld	W	D	L	PF	PA	PAv	PCT	Qualification
1	Dewsbury	24	19	1	4	431	172	2.506	81.25	Advanced to play-off semi-final
2	Bradford Northern	17	13	1	3	318	130	2.446	79.41	Advanced to play-off semi-final
3	Halifax	17	13	0	4	262	139	1.885	76.47	Advanced to play-off semi-final
4	Hull	18	12	0	6	265	146	1.815	66.67	Advanced to play-off semi-final
5	Hunslet	18	10	0	8	212	177	1.198	55.56	
6	Wigan	20	11	0	9	241	207	1.164	55.00	
7	Oldham	20	11	0	9	209	209	1.000	55.00	
8	Leeds	23	12	1	10	245	213	1.150	54.35	
9	Huddersfield	23	12	0	11	355	276	1.286	52.17	
10	Keighley	23	12	0	11	224	306	0.732	52.17	
11	Wakefield Trinity	19	9	0	10	195	215	0.907	47.37	
12	Featherstone Rovers	18	8	0	10	166	181	0.917	44.44	
13	St. Helens	19	8	0	11	217	270	0.804	42.11	
14	Castleford	20	8	0	12	195	253	0.771	40.00	
15	York	22	6	0	16	231	386	0.598	27.27	
16	Batley	18	3	1	14	133	269	0.494	19.44	
17	Bramley	19	0	0	19	104	454	0.229	0.00	

=== Championship final ===
1941–42 Championship Final

18 April 1942
3:30 pm

Dewsbury	13–0	Bradford Northern
Tries: Hudson, Francis, Kenny; Goals: Risman; Drop goals: Edwards

Headingley, Leeds
Referee: G. S. Phillips

Team details
Dewsbury		Position	Bradford Northern
Name	Number	Position	Number	Name
Miller (Salford)	1	FB	1	Carmichael
Hudson (Salford)	2	WG	2	Best
Edwards (Salford)	3	CE	3	Billington
Risman (Salford)	4	CE	4	Ward
Francis (Barrow)	5	WG	5	Walters
Kenny (Salford)	6	SO	6	W. Davies
Royal	7	SH	7	K. Davies (Keighley)
Hammond	8	PR	8	Whitcombe
Nicholson	9	HK	9	Carter (Leeds)
Gardner (Salford)	10	PF	10	Higson
Kershaw	11	SR	11	Foster
Curran (Salford)	12	SR	12	Smith
Bunter (Broughton Rangers)	13	LF	13	Hutchinson
Eddie Waring		Coach		Dai Rees

Befitting their league positions, the top two met at Headingley in the Championship Final on 18 April. Dewsbury, under manager-secretary Eddie Waring, had made wide use of the guest rules to build a strong team including several players currently in the army and based in West Yorkshire including Great Britain and Wales internationals Gus Risman and Roy Francis. Despite this strong team, the game was scoreless at the end of the first half. The first score was a drop goal from Dewsbury's Alan Edwards halfway into the second half and with the Dewsbury forwards dominating the scrums (the second half count was 30 to 6 in Dewsbury's favour), the Dewsbury backs including Risman and Francis took control and ran in three tries through Hudson, Francis and Kenny with Risman adding one goal. The final result of 13–0 was witnessed by over 18,000 spectators with the gate receipts totalling £1,121.

== Cup competitions ==
=== Lancashire Cup ===
With so few Lancashire clubs in the league, the RFL decided to continue the format of the previous season with the Lancashire Cup not being played for and the Lancashire clubs being allowed to enter the Yorkshire Cup.

=== Yorkshire Cup ===
The structure of the Yorkshire Cup was agreed upon at a meeting in September 1941. All 14 Yorkshire teams taking part in the league entered and they were joined by Lancashire teams, Oldham and Wigan. All ties were to be two legged except the final, with the competition being played over consecutive weekends starting on 25 October 1941.

Bradford Northern and Halifax won through to the final which was played at Fartown, Huddersfield on 6 December 1941. Bradford won the final, convincingly, 24–0 in front of a crowd of 6,100.

=== Challenge Cup ===
The Challenge Cup was played in April and May 1942. All 17 clubs competing in the league competition entered the Challenge Cup and were joined by Swinton who entered the cup despite having not played in the league. All ties except the final were played over two legs. The first two rounds were drawn on 25 March, the first round only comprised four teams with the other 14 all being given a bye to the second round.

Bramley's defeats to Hull F.C. in both legs of the second round concluded a dismal season for the club as they finished without a victory in any competition.

The competition was played on consecutive Saturdays from 11 April (first round, first leg) to 6 June 1942 (final).

The final was a repeat of the previous season's final as Leeds faced Halifax at Odsal Stadium in Bradford. Leeds retained the cup beating Halifax 15–10 on 6 June 1942. Among the victorious Leeds team were Salford players Alan Edwards and Gus Risman who had therefore been part of the winning Championship and Challenge Cup teams but for different clubs.

== Representative matches ==
=== England v Wales ===
18 October 1941
3:30 pm

England	9–9	Wales
Tries: Lawrensen; Goals: Belshaw (3)		Tries: Edwards; Goals: Risman (3)

Odsal, Bradford
Attendance: 4,339
Referee: F. Peel (England)

Team details
England		Position	Wales
Name	Number	Position	Number	Name
Belshaw (Warrington)	1	FB	1	Jones (Wigan)
Batten (Hunslet)	2	WG	2	Walters (Bradford)
Lawrenson (Wigan)	3	CE	3	Evans (Leeds)
Ward (Bradford)	4	CE	4	Risman (Salford)
Peake (Warrington)	5	WG	5	Edwards (Salford)
Brogden (Hull)	6	SO	6	Morris (Leeds)
Johnson (Johnson)	7	SH	7	Jenkins (Leeds)
Higson (Bradford)	8	PR	8	Prosser (Leeds)
Brooks (Oldham)	9	HK	9	Murphy (Leeds)
Thacker (Hull)	10	PF	10	Whitcombe (Bradford)
Irving (Halifax)	11	SR	11	Watkins (Wigan)
Jubb (Leeds)	12	SR	12	Orford (Wakefield)
Tattersfield (Leeds)	13	LF	13	Foster (Bradford)

An England v Wales match was played at Odsal, Bradford on 18 October 1941. A crowd of 4,339 saw the teams play out a 9-all draw with each side scoring a try and three goals. All the points were scored in the first half; England took an early lead with a Belshaw penalty but Wales scored a try through Edwards which Risman converted. A Risman penalty put Wales 7–2 ahead but England equalised with a try by Lawrensen which Belshaw converted. Wales regained their lead with another Rismen penalty but Belshaw kicked another penalty to square things up again. The Yorkshire Observer reporter, George Thompson, commented that by peace-time standards the game "wasn't so good" but "on war-time estimations it was quite a good game".

=== Northern Command v Rugby League XIII ===
21 March 1942
3:30 pm

Rugby League XIII	18–22	Northern Command XIII
Tries: Lawrensen (2), Chapman (2); Goals: Lockwood (3)		Tries: Francis, Pepperell, Case, Walsh; Goals: Ward (5)

Thrum Hall, Halifax
Attendance: 6,000
Referee: P. Cowell

Team details
Rugby League XIII		Position	Northern Command XIII
Name	Number	Position	Number	Name
Lockwood (Huddersfield)	1	FB	1	Ward (Bradford)
Batten (Hunslet)	2	WG	2	Case (Bradford)
Belshaw (c) (Warrington)	3	CE	3	Pepperell (Huddersfield)
Lawrenson (Wigan)	4	CE	4	Longley (Featherstone)
Edwards (Salford)	5	WG	5	Lloyd (Castleford)
Tracey (St Helens)	6	SO	6	Francis (Barrow)
Jenkins (Leeds)	7	SH	7	Walsh (Castleford)
Thacker (Hull)	8	PR	8	Prosser (Leeds)
Egan (Wigan)	9	HK	9	L. L. White (Castleford)
Gee (Wigan)	10	PF	10	L. White (York)
Orford (Wakefield)	11	SR	11	Foster (c) (Bradford)
Irving (Halifax)	12	SR	12	Jubb (Leeds)
Chapman (Warrington)	13	LF	13	Tattersfield (Leeds)

Rugby league was not recognised by the British armed services and rugby union was the only code approved, however the Northern Command sports board (NCSB) acknowledged the number of league players at their disposal and realised that there would be interest in fielding a rugby league team. A match between a Northern Command XIII and Bradford Northern was played at the beginning of the season following a suggestion made during the previous season. Bradford Northern won the match, played on 30 August, 24–21. On the back of this match the RFL had hoped to arrange a match between an Army XIII and a Rugby League XIII. The army declined the request as the fixture list for sports was too full, but the NCSB approached the RFL to play a match and one was fixed for 21 March 1942 and was played at Thrum Hall, Halifax.

In a match that was in the balance until the last minute, Northern Command took the lead with a try by Francis which Ward converted for a 5–0 lead. Penalties were traded then two League tries by Lawrensen and Chapman together with a Batten conversion gave the League team the lead 10–7. Northern Command struck back with a converted try by Pepperell to lead 12–10 at half time. Northern Command extended the lead to 14–10 early in the second half with a further Ward penalty but a second converted try by Chapman gave League the lead. A case try for Northern Command was matched by a second Lawrensen try to make the score 18–17 in the League's favour with time running out. In the last seconds of the game Northern scored a fifth try through Walsh which Ward converted to make the final score 22–18 to the army side.

=== Yorkshire League v Lancashire League ===
28 March 1942
3:30 pm

Yorkshire	13–2	Lancashire
Tries: Batten (2), Irving; Goals: Ward (2)		Goals: Belshaw

Crown Flatt, Dewsbury
Attendance: 4,000
Referee: F. Fairhurst

Team details
Yorkshire		Position	Lancashire
Name	Number	Position	Number	Name
Ward (Bradford)	1	FB	1	Butler (St Helens)
Batten (Hunslet)	2	WG	2	Lees (Oldham)
Fiddes (c) (Huddersfield)	3	CE	3	Lawrenson (Wigan)
Pepperell (Huddersfield)	4	CE	4	Belshaw (c) (Warrington)
Longley (Featherstone)	5	WG	5	Francis (Barrow)
Brogden (Hull)	6	SO	6	Cuncliffe (Wigan)
Jenkins (Leeds)	7	SH	7	Bradshaw (Wigan)
Whitcombe (Bradford)	8	PR	8	Gee (Wigan)
Murphy (Leeds)	9	HK	9	Brooks (Oldham)
Irving (Halifax)	10	PF	10	Garner (St Helens)
Kershaw (Dewsbury)	11	SR	11	Fearnley (St Helens)
Jubb (Leeds)	12	SR	12	Millington (Widnes)
Tattersfield (Leeds)	13	LF	13	Givvons (Oldham)

The final representative match of the season was between players from Yorkshire clubs and players from Lancashire clubs. The match was played at Crown Flatts, Dewsbury on 28 March 1942. 4,000 attended a game that despite Lancashire taking the lead with a Belshaw penalty, Yorkshire dominated. Yorkshire scored three tries with Batten getting two and Irving one - this commentators agreed was the best of the three - and with Ward converting two of the tries, the game ended 13–2 to Yorkshire.

== Financial performance ==
The RFL annual general meeting was held on 1 July 1942. The accounts showed the RFL showed a profit of £72 with assets of £21,935. The accounts of the Northern Football League i.e. the championship administered by the RFL, which were presented separately showed that the championship made a loss of £133.
