= 1935–36 Challenge Cup =

Rugby league competition

- Duration: 5 rounds
- Winners: Leeds
- Runners-up: Warrington

The 1935–36 Challenge Cup was the 36th staging of rugby league's oldest knockout competition, the Challenge Cup.

== First round ==
Date	Team one	Score one	Team two	Score two
08 Feb	Acton and Willesden	0	Liverpool	0
08 Feb	Barrow	8	Warrington	17
08 Feb	Batley	8	Bradford Northern	25
08 Feb	Bramley	0	Hunslet	13
08 Feb	Castleford	16	Rochdale Hornets	3
08 Feb	Featherstone Rovers	8	York	13
08 Feb	Halifax	10	Keighley	5
08 Feb	Higginshaw	2	Oldham	38
08 Feb	Huddersfield	12	Broughton Rangers	11
08 Feb	Hull FC	16	St Helens	6
08 Feb	Hull Kingston Rovers	5	Streatham and Mitcham	18
08 Feb	Leeds	18	Dewsbury	7
08 Feb	Leigh	49	Seaton Rangers	4
08 Feb	Salford	20	St Helens Recs	3
08 Feb	Swinton	2	Wakefield Trinity	9
08 Feb	Wigan	26	Widnes	9
17 Feb	Liverpool	29	Acton and Willesden	3

== Second round ==
Date	Team one	Score one	Team two	Score two
22 Feb	Bradford Northern	0	Wakefield Trinity	3
22 Feb	Castleford	8	Leigh	0
22 Feb	Halifax	2	Warrington	2
22 Feb	Huddersfield	8	York	2
22 Feb	Hull FC	9	Liverpool	0
22 Feb	Hunslet	2	Salford	2
22 Feb	Oldham	4	Wigan	15
22 Feb	Streatham and Mitcham	3	Leeds	13
22 Feb	Salford	20	Hunslet	2
27 Feb	Warrington	18	Halifax	15

== Quarterfinals ==
Date	Team one	Score one	Team two	Score two
07 Mar	Huddersfield	12	Wakefield Trinity	0
07 Mar	Hull FC	4	Leeds	5
07 Mar	Salford	5	Castleford	4
07 Mar	Warrington	5	Wigan	2

== Semifinals ==
Date	Team one	Score one	Team two	Score two
21 Mar	Warrington	7	Salford	2
21 Mar	Leeds	10	Huddersfield	5

== Final ==
Leeds beat Warrington 18-2 in the Challenge Cup Final played at Wembley Stadium on Saturday 18 April 1936 before a crowd of 51,250.

Evan Williams' three goals gave Leeds the victory.

This was Leeds’ fourth Challenge Cup final win in as many final appearances.

18 April 1936

Leeds	18 - 2	Warrington
Tries: Isaacs, F Harris, E Harris, Parker; Goals: E Williams (3); DG Ralph	Report	Goals Shankland

Wembley, London
Attendance: 51,250 (HT 10-2)
Referee: A S Dobson (Featherstone)

1	Jim Brough (c)
2	Eric Harris
3	Fred Harris
4	Gwyn Parker
5	Stan Brogden
6	Dicky Ralph
7	Evan Williams
8	Harry Dyer
9	John Hall
10	Stan Satterthwaite
11	Aubrey Casewell
12	Ken Jubb
13	Iorwerth Isaac

1	Bill Shankland (c)
2	Jack Garratt
3	Ben Hawker
4	Billy Dingsdale
5	Griff Jenkins
6	Jimmy Newcombe
7	Jack Goodall
8	Jack Miller
9	Dave Cotton
10	Sammy Hardman
11	Mick Flannery
12	Jack Arkwright
13	Jack Chadwick
