= 1937–38 Yorkshire Cup =

Yorkshire Cup Thirtieth Anniversary

- Structure: Regional knockout championship
- Teams: 16
- Winners: Leeds
- Runners-up: Huddersfield

The 1937–38 Yorkshire Cup was the thirtieth occasion on which the Yorkshire Cup competition had been held.

The Yorkshire Cup competition was a knock-out competition between (mainly professional) rugby league clubs from the county of Yorkshire. The actual area was at times increased to encompass other teams from outside the county such Mansfield, Coventry, this season's appearance of Newcastle, and even last year's appearance of London (in the form of Acton & Willesden. The competition always took place early in the season, in the Autumn, with the final taking place in (or just before) December (The only exception to this was when disruption of the fixture list was caused during, and immediately after, the two World Wars)

Leeds won the trophy by beating Huddersfield by the score of 14–8

The match was played at Belle Vue, in the City of Wakefield, now in West Yorkshire. The attendance was 22,000 and receipts were £1,508

This was Leeds' last of their six victories in a period of ten years, during which time they won every Yorkshire Cup final in which they appeared.

== Background ==
This season there were no junior/amateur clubs taking part, no new entrants and no "leavers" and so the total of entries remained the same at sixteen.

This in turn resulted in no in the first round.

== Competition and results ==
=== Round 1 ===
Involved 8 matches (with no byes) and 16 clubs

Game No	Fixture date	Home team	Score	Away team	Venue	Ref
1	Sat 11 Sep 1937	Batley	42–5	Newcastle (Note: This was Newcastle's second (and last) season in the league. According to "the Grounds of Rugby League" Newcastle RLFC moved for 1937/38 to the new White City Stadium in Gateshead.from the previous season's venue of Brough Park.)	Mount Pleasant	
2	Sat 11 Sep 1937	Bramley	2–5	Keighley	Barley Mow	
3	Sat 11 Sep 1937	Castleford	6–8	Dewsbury	Wheldon Road	
4	Sat 11 Sep 1937	Huddersfield	32–16	Featherstone Rovers	Fartown	
5	Sat 11 Sep 1937	Hull	21–13	Hunslet	Boulevard	
6	Sat 11 Sep 1937	Hull Kingston Rovers	10–11	Bradford Northern	Craven Park (1)	
7	Sat 11 Sep 1937	Leeds	20–7	York	Headingley	
8	Sat 11 Sep 1937	Wakefield Trinity	4–4	Halifax	Belle Vue	

=== Round 1 - replays ===
Involved 1 match and 2 clubs

Game No	Fixture date	Home team	Score	Away team	Venue	Ref
R	Thu 16 Sep 1937	Halifax	7–6	Wakefield Trinity	Thrum Hall	

=== Round 2 – quarterfinals ===
Involved 4 matches and 8 clubs

Game No	Fixture date	Home team	Score	Away team	Venue	Ref
1	Wed 22 Sep 1937	Bradford Northern	6–16	Leeds	Odsal	
2	Mon 27 Sep 1937	Huddersfield	13–6	Hull	Fartown	
3	Tue 28 Sep 1937	Keighley	7–9	Batley	Lawkholme Lane	
4	Wed 29 Sep 1937	Dewsbury	20–9	Halifax	Crown Flatt	

=== Round 3 – semifinals ===
Involved 2 matches and 4 clubs

Game No	Fixture date	Home team	Score	Away team	Venue	Ref
1	Mon 11 Oct 1937	Huddersfield	6–2	Dewsbury	Fartown	
2	Wed 13 Oct 1937	Leeds	10–5	Batley	Headingley	

=== Final ===
Game No	Fixture date	Home team	Score	Away team	Venue	Att	Rec	Notes	Ref
	Saturday 30 October 1937	Leeds	14–8	Huddersfield	Belle Vue	22,000	£1,508	(Note: Belle Vue is the home ground of Wakefield Trinity with a capacity of approximately 12,500. The record attendance was 37,906 on the 21 March 1936 in the Challenge Cup semi-final between Leeds and Huddersfield)	

==== Teams and scorers ====
Leeds	№	Huddersfield
	teams	
Charles "Charlie" Eaton	1	Tommy Scourfield
Eric Harris	2	Ray Markham
Fred Harris	3	Stan Mountain
Stan Brogden	4	Alex Fiddes
Stanley Smith	5	Dennis Madden
Vic Hey	6	Stan Pepperell
Cliff Evans	7	Eric Swallow
Harry Woods	8	Herbert Sherwood
Con Murphy	9	Harold Whitehead
Dai Prosser	10	David Morgan Evans
Ken Jubb	11	Bryan Langford
Harry Dyer	12	Shaw or Senior
Ted Tattersfield	13	Sep Aspinall
??	Coach	??
14	score	8
11	HT	3
	Scorers	
	Tries	
	T	Stan Mountain (1)
	T	Markham (1)
	Goals	
	G	Swallow (1)
	G	
Referee		unknown

Scoring - Try = three (3) points - Goal = two (2) points - Drop goal = two (2) points

=== The road to success ===
First round
Hull Kingston Rovers	10
Bradford Northern	11
Leeds	20
York	7
Bramley	2
Keighley	5
Batley	42
Newcastle	5
Huddersfield	32
Featherstone Rovers	16
Hull	21
Hunslet	13
Castleford	6
Dewsbury	8
Wakefield Trinity	4 (6)
Halifax	4 (7)

Second round
Bradford Northern	6
Leeds	16
Keighley	7
Batley	9
Huddersfield	13
Hull	6
Dewsbury	20
Halifax	9

Semifinals
Leeds	10
Batley	5
Huddersfield	6
Dewsbury	2

Final
Leeds	14
Huddersfield	8

== See also ==
- 1937–38 Northern Rugby Football League season
- Rugby league county cups
