= Vic Hey =

Australian RL coach and former Australia international rugby league footballer

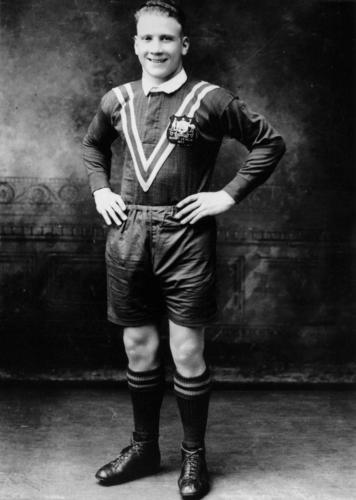

Personal information
- Full name: Victor John Hey
- Born: 18 November 1912 Liverpool, New South Wales, Australia
- Died: 11 April 1995 (aged 82)

Playing information
- Height: 173 cm (5 ft 8 in)
- Weight: 75 kg (11 st 11 lb)
- Position: Five-eighth
Club
| Years | Team | Pld | T | G | FG | P |
|---|---|---|---|---|---|---|
| 1929–35 | Western Suburbs | 27 | 18 | 1 | 0 | 56 |
| 1935–36 | Toowoomba |
| 1937 | Ipswich |
| 1937–44 | Leeds | 145 | 73 | 2 | 0 | 223 |
| 1944–47 | Dewsbury | 69 | 16 | 2 | 0 | 52 |
| 1947 | Hunslet | 9 | 4 | 0 | 0 | 12 |
| 1948–49 | Parramatta | 10 | 3 | 0 | 0 | 9 |
| | Total | 260 | 114 | 5 | 0 | 352 |
Representative
| Years | Team | Pld | T | G | FG | P |
| 1933–35 | New South Wales | 12 | 9 | 0 | 0 | 27 |
| 1933–36 | Australia | 6 | 2 | 0 | 0 | 6 |
| 1936 | Queensland | 4 | 0 | 0 | 0 | 0 |
| 1937 | British Empire | 1 | 1 | 0 | 0 | 3 |

Coaching information
Club
| Years | Team | Gms | W | D | L | W% |
| 1944–47 | Dewsbury RLFC | 0 | 0 | 0 | 0 |
| 1948–53 | Parramatta | 108 | 36 | 9 | 63 | 33 |
| 1955–56 | Canterbury-Bankstown | 36 | 10 | 0 | 26 | 28 |
| 1958–59 | Western Suburbs | 40 | 26 | 1 | 13 | 65 |
| | Total | 184 | 72 | 10 | 102 | 39 |
Representative
| Years | Team | Gms | W | D | L | W% |
| 1950–55 | Australia | 16 | 8 | 0 | 8 | 50 |
- Relatives: Dave Hey (brother)

Victor John Hey (18 November 1912 in Liverpool, New South Wales – 11 April 1995), also known by the nickname of "The Human Bullet", was an Australian rugby league national and state representative five-eighth and later a successful first-grade and national coach. His Australian club playing career commenced with the Western Suburbs Magpies, and concluded with the Parramatta Eels. In between he played for a number of clubs in the English first division. He is considered one of Australia's finest footballers of the 20th century

== Playing career ==
=== Sydney ===
After starring as a schoolboy and playing his junior football with Guildford in western Sydney, Vic Hey was graded with the Western Suburbs Magpies in 1933. In a spectacular rookie season he cemented a first grade club spot and made both his state and national representative débuts. Hey was a late selection for the 1933–34 Kangaroo tour of Great Britain replacing Ernie Norman who had failed a fitness test. On that tour he played in 23 tour matches and in all three Test matches of the Ashes series against England, partnering his Western Suburbs teammate Les Mead in the halves. On the tour he scored fourteen tries. In his second NSWRL season 1934, Hey was a member of Wests' premiership winning side. In September 2004 Hey was named at five-eighth in the Western Suburbs Magpies team of the century.

=== Queensland ===
Moving to Queensland in 1936, Vic Hey briefly played a season for Toowoomba before moving to Ipswich. While living in Toowoomba and playing for Ipswich in 1936 Hey represented Queensland in all three matches of that year's interstate representative series. In 1936, from Queensland he was again selected for all three Test matches of the domestic Ashes series against England. Despite formal protests from the Queensland Rugby League, he was paid 1,400 pounds sterling to sign on with English club Leeds, at the time a higher amount than the rugby league world record transfer fee.

=== England ===
At the end of the Australian 1936 season Hey left for Britain to play club football for Leeds, making his début against Hunslet on Saturday 21 August 1937. He was paid a then record signing fee of £1,400 (based on increases in average earnings, this would be approximately £218,100 in 2013). Vic Hey played stand-off in Leeds' 14–8 victory over Huddersfield in the 1937–38 Yorkshire Cup Final during the 1937–38 season at Belle Vue, Wakefield on Saturday 30 October 1937, and played stand-off in the 2–8 defeat by Hunslet in the Championship Final during the 1937–38 season at Elland Road, Leeds on Saturday 30 April 1938, played at centre in the 19–2 victory over Halifax in the 1940–41 Challenge Cup Final during the 1940–41 season at Odsal Stadium, Bradford, in front of a crowd of 28,500, and played at centre in the 15–10 victory over Halifax in the 1941–42 Challenge Cup Final during the 1941–42 season at Odsal Stadium, Bradford, in front of a crowd of 15,250.

Hey played in the 1938 Christmas Eve fixture between Leeds and Salford at Headingley Stadium. Headingley’s rugby pitch was frozen solid, but the cricket ground wasn’t so the goal posts were moved and 12,000 fans saw the Leeds win 5-0. Hey became the only player to score a try on Headingley’s cricket field.

Hey was player-coach at Dewsbury from 1944 to 1947, before playing nine times for Hunslet after his ship back to Australia was delayed.

Vic Hey played stand-off in Dewsbury's 14-25 aggregate defeat by Wigan in the Championship Final during the 1943–44 season; the 9-13 first-leg defeat at Central Park, Wigan on Saturday 13 May 1944, and the 5-12 second-leg defeat at Crown Flatt, Dewsbury on Saturday 20 May 1944.

=== Return to Sydney ===
Vic Hey signed for Parramatta in 1948 in that club's second season in the top grade. He was appointed as the club's captain-coach. He played two seasons 1948 and 1949 before retiring from first grade rugby league at age 37.

Following his retirement, Hey wrote rugby league's first memoir: A Man's Game which was released in 1950.

== Coaching career ==
Vic Hey coached Parramatta between 1948 and 1953. He went on to coach Canterbury in 1955 and 1956 and later Western Suburbs in 1958 and 1959. He was appointed coach of the Australia national rugby league team in 1950 and coached his country to their first Ashes victory in thirty years. The following year the French national side embarked on its first ever tour of Australasia, and defeated Hey's Australian team in a three Test domestic series. Hey also coached Australia in the 1954 World Cup as well as the Ashes series which Australia again won. The following year his side lost again to the French and afterwards he decided to resign as the coach of Australia.

== Accolades ==
For his achievements in rugby league, Vic Hey was inducted into the Australian Rugby League Hall of Fame in 2004. Also in 2004 he was named at five-eighth for the Western Suburbs Magpies team of the century.

In February 2008, Hey was named in the list of Australia's 100 Greatest Players (1908–2007) which was commissioned by the NRL and ARL to celebrate the code's centenary year in Australia.

== Footnotes ==
Achievements
| Preceded by Harold Buck | Rugby League Transfer Record; Ipswich to Leeds; 1937–1939 | Succeeded by ?? |
