= Mel Meek =

Welsh rugby union footballer, and rugby league footballer and coach

Personal information
- Full name: Alfred Melville Meek
- Born: c. 1912 Wales
- Died: 1997 (aged 85) Blackpool, England

Playing information

Rugby union
Club
Years	Team	Pld	T	G	FG	P
≤1934–≤34	Newport RFC
≤1934–≤34	Abertillery RFC
	Total	0	0	0	0	0

Rugby league
- Position: Prop, Hooker, Second-row
Club
Years	Team	Pld	T	G	FG	P
1934–48	Halifax	390	65
1948–50	Huddersfield
	Total	390	65	0	0	0
Representative
Years	Team	Pld	T	G	FG	P
1935–49	Wales	14

Alfred Melville "Mel" Meek (c. 1912 – 1997) was a Welsh rugby union and professional rugby league footballer who played in the 1930s and 1940s, and coached rugby league. He played club level rugby union (RU) for Newport RFC and Abertillery RFC, and representative level rugby league (RL) for Wales, and at club level for Halifax and Huddersfield, as a prop, hooker, or second-row, and coached at club level for Huddersfield.

== Playing career ==
=== Club career ===
Meek played hooker, and scored a goal in Halifax's 2–9 defeat by Leeds in the 1940–41 Challenge Cup Final during the 1940–41 season at Odsal, Bradford, in front of a crowd of 28,500, and played at second-row in the 10–15 defeat by Leeds in the 1941–42 Challenge Cup Final during the 1941–42 season on Saturday 6 June 1942.

After the Second World War, he joined Huddersfield, helping them win the 1948–49 Championship. He retired in 1950.

=== International honours ===
Meek won 14 caps for Wales in 1935–1949 while at Halifax.

== Coaching career ==
Meek was appointed as trainer at Huddersfield in 1957. He left the club in 1963. He was then appointed as coach at Blackpool Borough in 1965, remaining with the club until his retirement in 1976.
