= 1938–39 Challenge Cup =

Rugby league competition

- Duration: 5 rounds
- Winners: Halifax
- Runners-up: Salford

The 1938–39 Challenge Cup was the 39th staging of rugby league's oldest knockout competition, the Challenge Cup.

== First round ==
Date	Team One	Score One	Team Two	Score Two
04 Feb	Featherstone Rovers	3	Batley	0
04 Feb	Halifax	8	Barrow	3
04 Feb	Higginshaw	3	Swinton	46
04 Feb	Hull Kingston Rovers	8	Hull FC	5
04 Feb	Hunslet	48	United Glass Bottle	5
04 Feb	Keighley	11	York	9
04 Feb	Leeds	9	Huddersfield	2
04 Feb	Oldham	10	Castleford	3
04 Feb	Rochdale Hornets	3	Warrington	29
04 Feb	Salford	11	St Helens	0
04 Feb	Sharlston Rovers	5	Bramley	23
04 Feb	Widnes	10	Dewsbury	5
04 Feb	Wigan	33	Leigh	0
08 Feb	Bradford Northern	37	Seaton Rangers	7
08 Feb	Broughton Rangers	5	Wakefield Trinity	5
08 Feb	Liverpool	2	St Helens Recs	2
13 Feb	St Helens Recs	12	Liverpool	3
13 Feb	Wakefield Trinity	23	Broughton Rangers	5

== Second round ==
Date	Team One	Score One	Team Two	Score Two
18 Feb	Bradford Northern	2	Oldham	0
18 Feb	Halifax	6	Hull Kingston Rovers	2
18 Feb	Keighley	10	Featherstone Rovers	0
18 Feb	Leeds	6	Widnes	2
18 Feb	St Helens Recs	3	Wigan	8
18 Feb	Salford	18	Hunslet	2
18 Feb	Swinton	0	Bramley	5
18 Feb	Wakefield Trinity	7	Warrington	2

== Quarter-finals ==
Date	Team One	Score One	Team Two	Score Two
11 Mar	Keighley	0	Leeds	2
11 Mar	Salford	20	Bramley	0
11 Mar	Wakefield Trinity	5	Halifax	5
11 Mar	Wigan	7	Bradford Northern	0
15 Mar	Halifax	15	Wakefield Trinity	12

== Semi-finals ==
Date	Team One	Score One	Team Two	Score Two
01 Apr	Halifax	10	Leeds	4
01 Apr	Salford	11	Wigan	2

== Final ==
Halifax beat Salford 20-3 in the final played at Wembley on Saturday 6 May 1939 in front of a crowd of 55,453. There would be no Challenge Cup competition in 1939–40.

This was Halifax’s fourth Cup Final win in five Final appearances.

This was Salford’s fifth Final appearance and second in consecutive years, having won the Cup the previous season

6 May 1939

Halifax	20 – 3	Salford
Try Smith, Treen, Todd, Bevan; Goals Lockwood (4)		Try Risman

Wembley, London
Attendance: 55,453
Referee: G S Phillips (Widnes)

1	Hubert Lockwood
2	Jim Bevan
3	Charles Smith
4	Jack Treen
5	Arthur Bassett
6	George Todd
7	Jack Goodall
8	George Baynham
9	Harry Field
10	Hudson Irving
11	Jack Cox
12	John Chadwick
13	Harry Beverley
Coach:

1	Harold Osbaldestin
2	Barney Hudson
3	Sammy Miller
4	Gus Risman
5	Alan Edwards
6	Tom Kenny
7	Billy Watkins
8	David Davies
9	Bert Day
10	Joe Bradbury
11	Paddy Dalton
12	Harold Thomas
13	Jack Feetham
Coach:
