= Henry Dyer (disambiguation) =

Henry Dyer was a Scottish engineer.

Henry Dyer may also refer to:

- Henry Dyer (American football) (born 1945), former American football running back
- Sir Henry Peter Swinnerton-Dyer (born 1927), English mathematician

== See also ==
- Harry Dyer, English rugby league footballer of the 1930s
