= Billy Watson (rugby league) =

England international rugby league footballer

Personal information
- Full name: William Watson
- Born: Keighley, England
- Died: unknown

Playing information
- Position: Hooker
Club
Years	Team	Pld	T	G	FG	P
≤1925–34	Keighley
1934–≥39	Huddersfield	≥73
	Total		0	0	0	0
Representative
Years	Team	Pld	T	G	FG	P
1925–40	Yorkshire	2
1934–34	Rugby League XIII	1	0	0	0	0
1934	Great Britain	2	0	0	0	0

William Watson (birth unknown – death unknown) was an English professional rugby league footballer who played in the 1920s and 1930s, and coached in the 1940s. He played at representative level for Great Britain, Rugby League XIII and Yorkshire, and at club level for Keighley and Huddersfield, as a prop, hooker, or loose forward, and coached at club level for Keighley (A-Team assisted by Norman Foster).

== Background ==
Billy Watson was born in Keighley, West Riding of Yorkshire, England.

== Playing career ==
Billy Watson played hooker for the Yorkshire League versus Lancashire League at Craven Park, Barrow on 23 March 1940, in a strong front-row with Hudson Irving (Halifax) and Frank Whitcombe (Bradford Northern).

=== International honours ===
Billy Watson represented Rugby League XIII while at Keighley in 1934 against France, and won caps for Great Britain while at Keighley in 1934 against Australia, and France.

=== Challenge Cup Final appearances ===
Billy Watson played hooker in Huddersfield's 8-11 defeat by Castleford in the 1935 Challenge Cup Final during the 1934–35 season at Wembley Stadium, London on Saturday 4 May 1935, in front of a crowd of 39,000.
