= Dai Prosser =

Wales dual-code rugby & GB rugby league international footballer

David Rees Prosser

Personal information
- Full name: David Rees Prosser
- Born: 13 October 1912 Neath, Wales
- Died: 6 May 1973 (aged 60) York, England

Playing information

Rugby union
- Position: Prop forward
Club
Years	Team	Pld	T	G	FG	P
	Glynneath RFC
	Neath RFC
	Swansea RFC
	Total	0	0	0	0	0
Representative
Years	Team	Pld	T	G	FG	P
	Glamorgan County RFC
1934	Wales	2

Rugby league
- Position: Prop
Club
Years	Team	Pld	T	G	FG	P
1934–36	York
1936–50	Leeds	327	13	1	0	41
	York
	Total	327	13	1	0	41
Representative
Years	Team	Pld	T	G	FG	P
1936–44	Wales	8
1937	Great Britain	1	0	0	0	0
1942	Northern Command XIII	0	0	0	0	0

Coaching information
Club
Years	Team	Gms	W	D	L	W%
	York
- Relatives: Glyn Prosser (brother)

David "Dai" Rees Prosser (13 October 1912 – 6 May 1973) was a Welsh dual-code international rugby union, and professional rugby league footballer who played in the 1930s and 1940s, and coached rugby league in the 1960s. He played representative level rugby union (RU) for Wales and Glamorgan County RFC, and at club level for Glynneath RFC, Neath RFC and Swansea RFC as a prop, and representative level rugby league (RL) for Great Britain and Wales, and at club level for York and Leeds as a prop, and coached club level rugby league for Leeds.

== Background ==
Dai Prosser was born in Neath, Wales, he was a Bombardier in the British Army during World War II, and he died aged 60 in York, Yorkshire.

== Playing career ==
=== Club career ===
Prosser made his rugby league debut for York in September 1934. He played for York in their 1935 Yorkshire Cup final defeat against Leeds. The following year, Prosser played at prop in York's 9–2 victory over Wakefield Trinity in the 1936 Yorkshire Cup Final during the 1936–37 season at Headingley, Leeds on Saturday 17 October 1936.

Prosser made his début for Leeds against Dewsbury in the Championship during the 1936–37 season on Saturday 14 November 1936, and he scored his first try for Leeds against Huddersfield during the 1937–38 season.

He played at prop in Leeds' 14–8 victory over Huddersfield in the 1937–38 Yorkshire Cup Final during the 1937–38 season at Belle Vue, Wakefield on Saturday 30 October 1937.

Prosser played at prop in Leeds' 2–8 defeat by Hunslet in the Championship Final during the 1937–38 season at Elland Road, Leeds on Saturday 30 April 1938.

Prosser played at prop in Leeds' 19–2 victory over Halifax in the 1940–41 Challenge Cup Final during the 1940–41 season at Odsal Stadium, Bradford, in front of a crowd of 28,500, played at prop in the 15–10 victory over Halifax in the 1941–42 Challenge Cup Final during the 1941–42 season at Odsal Stadium, Bradford, in front of a crowd of 15,250, he missed the 15-16 aggregate defeat by Dewsbury in the two-legged 1942–43 Challenge Cup Final during the 1942–43 season at Crown Flatt, Dewsbury and Headingley, Leeds, and played at prop in the 8–4 defeat by Bradford Northern in the 1947 Challenge Cup Final during the 1946–47 season at Wembley Stadium, London on Saturday 3 May 1947, in front of a crowd of 77,605.

During Dai Prosser's time at Leeds, they appeared in four Challenge Cup Finals winning two (1941 and 1942), and losing two (1943 and 1947), he appeared in three of these Challenge Cup Finals, and was on the winning side twice.

Prosser's shared Testimonial match with David "Dai" Jenkins, Jr. at Leeds took place in 1949.

In September 1950, he returned to his former club, York.

=== Representative honours ===
In rugby union, Prosser won two caps for Wales while at Glynneath RFC in 1934 against Scotland, and Ireland. He won eight caps for Wales in rugby league between 1936 and 1944 while at York, and Leeds, and won a cap for Great Britain (RL) while at Leeds in 1937 against Australia at Fartown Ground, Huddersfield.

Prosser played at prop for Northern Command XIII against a Rugby League XIII at Thrum Hall, Halifax on Saturday 21 March 1942.

== Coaching career ==
Prosser was appointed as coach at York at the start of the 1953–54 season.

Prosser was the assistant-coach to Joe Warham in Leeds' 25–10 victory over Warrington in the Championship Final during the 1960–61 season at Odsal Stadium, Bradford on Saturday 20 May 1961, in front of a crowd of 52,177.

== Family ==
Dai Prosser was the younger brother of the rugby union, and rugby league footballer; Glyn Prosser.
