= Hubert Lockwood =

English rugby league footballer

Personal information
- Born: 26 January 1909 Huddersfield, England
- Died: 25 May 2005 (aged 96) Huddersfield, England

Playing information

Rugby union
Club
Years	Team	Pld	T	G	FG	P
19??–31	Huddersfield RUFC

Rugby league
- Position: Fullback
Club
Years	Team	Pld	T	G	FG	P
1931–34	Huddersfield
1934–46	Halifax	348	6	816	2	1654
	Total	348	6	816	2	1654
Representative
Years	Team	Pld	T	G	FG	P
1936–38	Yorkshire	3	0	7	0	14

Hubert Lockwood (26 January 1909 – 25 May 2005) was an English rugby union and professional rugby league footballer who played in the 1930s and 1940s, and cricketer. He played club level rugby union (RU) for Huddersfield R.U.F.C., and representative rugby league (RL) for Yorkshire, and at club level for Huddersfield and Halifax, as a goal-kicking fullback.

== Background ==
Hubert Lockwood was born in Huddersfield, West Riding of Yorkshire, England, he founded a laundry and dry cleaning business with a shop in Elland in 1953, and he died aged 96 at Kirkwood Hospice, Dalton, Huddersfield, West Yorkshire, England.

== Playing career ==
=== County Honours ===
Hubert Lockwood won caps for Yorkshire (RL) while at Halifax.

=== Challenge Cup Final appearances ===
Hubert Lockwood played fullback, and scored four goals, in Halifax's 20–3 victory over Salford in the 1938–39 Challenge Cup Final during the 1938–39 season at Wembley Stadium, London on Saturday 6 May 1939, in front of a crowd of 55,453, and played fullback in the 10-15 defeat by Leeds in the 1941–42 Challenge Cup Final during the 1941–42 season on Saturday 6 June 1942.

=== Club career ===
Hubert Lockwood changed rugby football codes from rugby union to rugby league when he transferred from Huddersfield (RU) to Huddersfield (RL), he transferred from Huddersfield to Halifax on 27 January 1934, he made his dêbut for Halifax on Saturday 27 January 1934, and he played his last match for Halifax on Monday 22 April 1946.

== Honoured at Halifax ==
Hubert Lockwood is a Halifax Hall Of Fame Inductee.
