= Stan Mountain =

Wales international rugby league & union footballer

Stanley Mountain
Personal information
- Full name: Stanley James Mountain
- Born: 15 August 1909 Newport, Wales
- Died: 6 September 1975 (aged 66) Newport, Wales

Playing information

Rugby union
- Position: Centre
Club
| Years | Team | Pld | T | G | FG | P |
|---|---|---|---|---|---|---|
| 1929–35 | Newport RFC | 34 | 10 |

Rugby league
- Position: Wing, Centre
Club
| Years | Team | Pld | T | G | FG | P |
|---|---|---|---|---|---|---|
| 1935–≥37 | Huddersfield |
Representative
| Years | Team | Pld | T | G | FG | P |
| 1937 | Rugby League XIII | 1 |
| 1935 | Wales | 1 |

Stanley James Mountain (1909 – 1975) was a rugby union and professional rugby league footballer who played in the 1920s and 1930s. He played club level rugby union (RU) for Newport RFC, as a centre, and representative level rugby league (RL) for Rugby League XIII and Wales, and at club level for Huddersfield, as a wing or centre.

== Background ==
Stan Mountain's birth was registered in Newport district, Wales.

== Playing career ==
=== International honours ===
Stan Mountain won caps for Wales (RL) while at Huddersfield in 1935.

=== Challenge Cup Final appearances ===
Stan Mountain played on the wing in Huddersfield's 8–11 defeat by Castleford in the 1934–35 Challenge Cup Final during the 1934–35 season at Wembley Stadium, London on Saturday 4 May 1935, in front of a crowd of 39,000.

=== County Cup Final appearances ===
Stan Mountain played at centre, and scored a try in Huddersfield's 8–14 defeat by Leeds in the 1937–38 Yorkshire Cup Final during the 1937–38 season at Belle Vue, Wakefield on Saturday 30 October 1937.
