= Jim Brough =

English rugby league footballer (1903–1986)

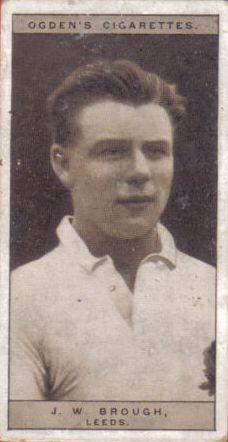
- Ogden's Cigarette card featuring 'Gentleman' Jim Brough

Personal information
- Full name: James Wasdale Brough
- Born: 5 November 1903 Silloth, Cumberland, England
- Died: 16 September 1986 (aged 82) Workington, Cumbria, England

Playing information

Rugby union
- Position: Fullback
Club
Years	Team	Pld	T	G	FG	P
1921–25	Silloth RUFC	70+	4+	8+	1+	30+
Representative
Years	Team	Pld	T	G	FG	P
1923–25	Cumberland	15	1	1	1	9
1925	England	2	0	0	0	0

Rugby league
- Position: Fullback, Centre
Club
Years	Team	Pld	T	G	FG	P
1925–1944	Leeds	442	37	82	2	279
Representative
Years	Team	Pld	T	G	FG	P
1925–36	Cumberland	24	8	5	0	34
1926–36	England	9	3	7	0	23
1928–36	Great Britain	6	0	0	0	0

Coaching information
Club
Years	Team	Gms	W	D	L	W%
1948	Batley
≤1955–≥58	Workington Town
1962	Whitehaven RLFC	0	0	0	0
	Total	0	0	0	0
Representative
Years	Team	Gms	W	D	L	W%
1958–59	Great Britain	8	5	0	3	63

James Wasdale Brough (5 November 1903 – 16 September 1986), also known by the nickname of 'Gentleman Jim' , was an English dual-code international rugby union, association football (soccer) footballer, and professional rugby league footballer who played in the 1920s and 1930s, and rugby league coach of the 1940s and 1950s. He played representative level rugby union (RU) for England and Cumberland, and at club level for Silloth RUFC, as a fullback, and club level association football as an amateur for Liverpool (reserve team), as a goalkeeper, and representative level rugby league (RL) for Great Britain (captain), and England, and at club level for Leeds, as a fullback, or centre, and coached representative level rugby league (RL) for Great Britain, and at club level for Batley and Workington Town. Born in Silloth, Cumberland, England, he died in Workington, Cumbria, England.

== Playing career ==
=== Rugby union ===
Brough was working in the fishing industry and his main interest was sailing model yachts until, aged 17, he joined some other young men in forming a rugby union club. This short-lived club, set up by friends who could not get a game with Silloth RUFC, gave him an interest in the sport and he soon found himself playing for the Silloth club itself. He was part of Silloth’s second team that won the Cumbria Shield in 1922–23 season, beating Aspatria seconds 3-0. Towards the end of that season he found himself playing for Silloth’s first team playing in the Cumbria Cup final which Silloth lost out to Aspatria 9-0. By the age of 19, he was playing rugby union for the county team of Cumberland, and by age 21 he had played for England (RU). His Test début was in January 1925 against New Zealand at Twickenham Stadium, South London. Two weeks later, he appeared against Wales.

Various rugby league sides were now taking note of Brough's ability, including Barrow, Huddersfield, Hull FC, Swinton and Warrington. Despite being offered as much as £350 to join the league ranks, Brough chose instead to sign with association football club Liverpool as an amateur association footballer. He then discovered that he was unlikely to supplant Liverpool's incumbent goalkeeper, Elisha Scott, and when rugby league club Leeds offered him a signing-on fee in excess of £600, he joined the ranks of professional rugby league footballers.

=== Rugby league ===
Brough made his rugby league début for Leeds against York at Headingley, Leeds on Wednesday 2 September 1925.

Brough played fullback in Leeds' 11–8 victory over Swinton in the 1931–32 Challenge Cup Final at Central Park, Wigan, on Saturday 7 May 1932, in front of a crowd of 29,000, then was captain in the 18–2 victory over Huddersfield in the 1935–36 Challenge Cup Final at Wembley Stadium, London on Saturday 18 April 1936, in front of a crowd of 51,250, he missed the 19–2 victory over Halifax in the 1940–41 Challenge Cup Final at Odsal Stadium, Bradford, and played fullback in the 15–10 victory over Halifax in the 1941–42 Challenge Cup Final at Odsal Stadium, Bradford, on Saturday 6 June 1942.

=== International honours ===
As a professional rugby league footballer, Brough won caps for England in 1926 against Wales, and Other Nationalities, in 1928 against Wales, in 1929 against Other Nationalities, in 1932 against Wales, in 1933 against Other Nationalities, in 1934 against Australia, in 1935 against France, and Wales, in 1936 against Wales, and France, and won caps for Great Britain while at Leeds in 1928 against Australia (2 matches), and New Zealand (2 matches), and in 1936 against Australia (captain).

== Coaching career ==
Brough was the coach of Batley from January 1948 to May 1948, and was the coach in Workington Town's 12–21 defeat by Barrow in the 1954–55 Challenge Cup Final at Wembley Stadium, London on Saturday 30 April 1955, and was the coach in the 9–13 defeat by Wigan in the 1957–58 Challenge Cup Final at Wembley Stadium, London on Saturday 10 May 1958, in front of a crowd of 66,109.

Aside from his club roles, Brough was also coach of the Great Britain rugby league team.

== Honoured at Silloth RUFC ==
In 2005, in honour of Jim Brough, Silloth RUFC renamed its ground, The Jim Brough Rugby Park.

== Personal life ==
Jim Brough married Florance Annie (née Carr) in 1928 in Wigton. They had two children, the golfers Samuel John Brough (1931–2014), and Florance Poinsettia Pamela Brough (1936–2017); the organist and composer Michael James Arman Brough (b. 1960) is Jim Brough's grandson.
