= Ken Jubb =

GB & England international rugby league footballer

Personal information
- Full name: Kenneth Jubb
- Born: c. 1912 Wakefield district, England
- Died: 1993 (aged 81) Bradford, England

Playing information
- Position: Second-row
Club
Years	Team	Pld	T	G	FG	P
1930–33	Castleford	67	8	0	0	24
1933–47	Leeds
	Total	67	8	0	0	24
Representative
Years	Team	Pld	T	G	FG	P
1932–≥32	Yorkshire	≥1
1933–43	England	4	1	0	0	3
1937	Great Britain	2	0	0	0	0
1942	Northern Command XIII	1	0	0	0	0

Kenneth "Ken"/"Jubby" Jubb (c. 1912 – 1993) was an English professional rugby league footballer who played in the 1930s and 1940s. He played at representative level for Great Britain, England and Yorkshire, and at club level for Castleford and Leeds, as a second-row. Jubb was a sergeant major in the British Army during the Second World War.

== Background ==
Ken Jubb's birth was registered in Wakefield district, West Riding of Yorkshire, England, he was later the landlord of the Town Hall Tavern, 17 Westgate, Leeds until c. 1940 when his fellow Leeds rugby league footballer Dai Jenkins Jr. became the landlord, and he died aged c. 80–81.

== Playing career ==
=== Challenge Cup Final appearances ===
Jubb played at second-row in Leeds' 18–2 victory over Warrington in the 1935–36 Challenge Cup Final during the 1935–36 season at Wembley Stadium, London on Saturday 18 April 1936, in front of a crowd of 51,250, and played at second-row in Leeds' 15–16 aggregate defeat by Dewsbury in the 1942–43 Challenge Cup Final during 1942–43 season; the 9–16 defeat by Dewsbury at Crown Flatt, Dewsbury on Saturday 24 April 1943, in front of a crowd of 10,740, and the 6–0 victory over Dewsbury at Headingley, Leeds on Monday 26 April 1943, in front of a crowd of 16,000.

=== County League appearances ===
Jubb played in Castleford's victory in the Yorkshire League during the 1932–33 season.

=== County Cup Final appearances ===
Jubb played at second-row in Leeds' 14–8 victory over Huddersfield in the 1937–38 Yorkshire Cup Final during the 1937–38 season at Belle Vue, Wakefield on Saturday 30 October 1937.

=== Other notable matches ===
Jubb played at second-row for Northern Command XIII against a Rugby League XIII at Thrum Hall, Halifax on Saturday 21 March 1942.

=== Jubb and the 1938 Championship Final ===
Jubb missed one of the biggest sporting events ever to take place in Leeds; Leeds 2–8 defeat by Hunslet in the Championship Final 1937–38 season at Elland Road on Saturday 30 April 1938, following his suspension for being sent off in a previous game.

=== Representative honours ===
Jubb won caps for England while at Leeds in 1933 against Australia, in 1938 against Wales, in 1941 against Wales, in 1943 against Wales, and won caps for Great Britain while at Leeds in 1937 against Australia (2 matches).

Jubb won a cap for Yorkshire while at Castleford, playing at second-row in the 30–3 victory over Lancashire at Belle Vue, Wakefield on 29 October 1932.

== Tributes to Jubb ==
In the book Nothing but the Best. Outstanding Leeds Rugby Players 1928–1988, the former Leeds secretary Ken Dalby paid the following tribute to Jubb:

Highest today, Jubby! Resilient as an India-rubber ball, restless as a panther patrolling its patch, Ken Jubb was a rattling good forward, whose 'party piece' was a massive punt, occasionally way off target, that soared into outer space to the accompaniment of good-natured banter from Headingley's South Stand. Moreover, from time to time, as an encore to one of his pile driving touchline cover tackles, he would slip in an acrobatic extra, cartwheels and flips being his speciality. We loved the guy!
