= Oliver Morris (rugby) =

Wales international rugby league footballer

Personal information
- Full name: Oliver James Morris
- Born: fourth ¼ 1916 Llanelli district, Wales
- Died: 20 September 1944 (aged 27) Gothic Line, Fascist Italy

Playing information
- Weight: 9 st 5 lb (59 kg)

Rugby union
- Position: Fly-half
Club
| Years | Team | Pld | T | G | FG | P |
|---|---|---|---|---|---|---|
| ≤1936–36 | Llanelli RFC |
| 1936–37 | Pontypridd RFC |
| | Total | 0 | 0 | 0 | 0 | 0 |

Rugby league
- Position: Stand-off
Club
| Years | Team | Pld | T | G | FG | P |
|---|---|---|---|---|---|---|
| 1937–39 | Hunslet | 55 | 21 |
| 1939–≥42 | Leeds | 61 | 44 | 33 | | 198 |
| 194?–4? | →Castleford (guest) |
| | Total | 116 | 65 | 33 | 0 | 198 |
Representative
| Years | Team | Pld | T | G | FG | P |
| 1938–41 | Wales | 5 | 0 | 0 | 0 | 0 |
| 1942 | Northern Command XIII | 1 | 0 | 0 | 0 | 0 |
- Military career
- Allegiance: United Kingdom
- Branch: British Army
- Service years: 1939-44
- Rank: Lieutenant
- Unit: Welch Regiment
- Conflicts: World War II

Oliver James Morris (fourth ¼ 1916 – 20 September 1944) was a Welsh rugby union and professional rugby league footballer who played in the 1930s and 1940s. He played club level rugby union (RU) for Llanelli RFC and Pontypridd RFC, and representative level rugby league (RL) for Wales, and at club level for Hunslet, Castleford (as a wartime guest) and Leeds, as a stand-off.

== Background ==
Oliver James Morris' birth was registered in Llanelli district, Wales. He was a sergeant major, later a lieutenant, in the British Army (1st battalion of the Welch Regiment (note archaic spelling)) during World War II, and he was killed aged 27 in Northern Italy, whilst fighting on the Gothic Line, during the Italian Campaign.

== Rugby Union ==
Morris started his Rugby union career with Llanelli RFC but became a key part of the Pontypridd RFC team in the mid-to-late 1930s as their Fly-half. Morris became the first player from the Pontypridd club to ‘go north’ in November 1937. Weighing just nine and a half stones, there was great doubts about his ability to make it in professional rugby league.

== Rugby League ==
=== International honours ===
Oliver Morris won 5 caps for Wales (RL) in 1938–1941 while at Hunslet, and Leeds.

=== Championship final appearances ===
Oliver Morris played stand-off in Hunslet's 8–2 victory over Leeds in the Championship Final during the 1937–38 season at Elland Road, Leeds on Saturday 30 April 1938.

=== Challenge Cup Final appearances ===
Oliver Morris played stand-off in Leeds' 19–2 victory over Halifax in the 1940–41 Challenge Cup Final during the 1940–41 season at Odsal Stadium, Bradford, in front of a crowd of 28,500, and played stand-off in the 15–10 victory over Halifax in the 1941–42 Challenge Cup Final during the 1941–42 season at Odsal Stadium, Bradford, in front of a crowd of 15,250.

=== Other notable matches ===
Oliver Morris played stand-off for Northern Command XIII against a Rugby League XIII at Thrum Hall, Halifax on Saturday 21 March 1942.

=== Club career ===
Oliver Morris made his début for Leeds against Broughton Rangers at The Cliff, Broughton, Salford on Saturday 26 August 1939.

== Death ==
During the war, Morris became a Lieutenant in the Welch Regiment, and was killed in Italy on 21 September 1944 aged twenty-seven.
