= Ted Tattersfield =

English RL coach and former England international rugby league footballer

Personal information
- Full name: Edward Tattersfield
- Born: 10 March 1912 Kingston upon Hull, England
- Died: 4 October 1991 (aged 79)

Playing information
- Position: Second-row, Loose forward
Club
Years	Team	Pld	T	G	FG	P
≤1935–37	Hull Kingston Rovers	148	27	44		169
1937–45	Leeds	211	21	30		123
≥1941–≤45	→ Halifax (guest)
1945–46	Batley
1946–47	Hull FC
	Total	359	48	74	0	292
Representative
Years	Team	Pld	T	G	FG	P
1940–44	England	4	0	0	0	0
1942	Northern Command XIII	1	0	0	0	0

Coaching information
Club
Years	Team	Gms	W	D	L	W%
1946–49	Hull FC

Edward Tattersfield (second ¼ 1912 – 4 October 1991) was an English professional rugby league footballer who played in the 1930s and 1940s, and coached in the 1940s. He played at representative level for England, and at club level for Reckitt ARLFC (works team of Reckitt and Sons in Kingston upon Hull), Hull Kingston Rovers, Leeds (captain), Halifax (World War II guest), Batley and Hull FC, as an occasional goal-kicking second-row or loose forward, and coached at club level for Hull F.C. and the Hull Dockers (Hull and District League). Ted Tattersfield was a Corporal in the British Army during World War II.

== Background ==
Ted Tattersfield's birth was registered in Kingston upon Hull, East Riding of Yorkshire, England.

== Playing career ==
=== Championship final appearances ===
Tattersfield played at second-row, and scored a penalty goal in Leeds' 2–8 defeat by Hunslet in the Championship Final during the 1937–38 season at Elland Road, Leeds on Saturday 30 April 1938.

=== Challenge Cup Final appearances ===
Tattersfield played loose forward in Leeds' 19–2 victory over Halifax in the 1940–41 Challenge Cup Final during the 1940–41 season at Odsal Stadium, Bradford, in front of a crowd of 28,500, and played loose forward in the 15–10 victory over Halifax in the 1941–42 Challenge Cup Final during the 1941–42 season at Odsal Stadium, Bradford, in front of a crowd of 15,250.

=== County Cup Final appearances ===
Tattersfield played loose forward in Leeds' 14–8 victory over Huddersfield in the 1937–38 Yorkshire Cup Final during the 1937–38 season at Belle Vue, Wakefield on Saturday 30 October 1937.

=== Other notable matches ===
Tattersfield played loose forward for Northern Command XIII against a Rugby League XIII at Thrum Hall, Halifax on Saturday 21 March 1942.

=== Club career ===
Tattersfield transferred from Reckitt ARLFC to Hull Kingston Rovers, he transferred from Hull Kingston Rovers to Leeds, he made his initial début for Leeds against Bradford Northern at Odsal Stadium, Bradford on Saturday 30 January 1937, however this match was abandoned after c. 40-minutes, so his official début took place against Halifax at Headingley, Leeds on Saturday 6 February 1937, he played as a World War II guest from Leeds at Halifax, he transferred from Leeds to Batley during April 1945, he transferred from Batley to Hull FC.

=== International honours ===
Tattersfield won caps for England while at Leeds in 1940 against Wales, in 1941 against Wales, in 1943 against Wales, and in 1944 against Wales.
