= Norman Foster (rugby league) =

England international rugby league footballer

Personal information
- Full name: Norman Foster
- Born: fourth ¼ 1907 Settle (birth registered Keighley district)
- Died: February 1999 (aged 91)

Playing information
- Position: Centre
Club
Years	Team	Pld	T	G	FG	P
1929–36	Keighley	371
≤1936–36	Halifax
≤1937–37	Hull Kingston Rovers
≤1938–≥38	Newcastle RLFC
≤1939–≥45	Keighley
	Total	371	0	0	0	0
Representative
Years	Team	Pld	T	G	FG	P
	Yorkshire
1935	England	1	0	0	0	0

Norman Foster (birth registered fourth ¼ 1907 – February 1999) was an English professional rugby league footballer who played in the 1920s, 1930s and 1940s, and coached in the 1940s and 1950s. He played at representative level for England and Yorkshire, and at club level for Keighley (two spells), Halifax, Hull Kingston Rovers and Newcastle RLFC, as a centre, and coached at club level for Keighley (A-Team Assistant Coach to Billy Watson), Prince-Smith & Stells ARLFC (see also Prince-Smith baronets) and Keighley Albion ARLFC.

== Playing career ==
=== Club career ===
Foster made his début for Keighley against Featherstone Rovers at Post Office Road during the 1928-29 season on Tuesday 2 April 1929, and he was transferred from Keighley to Halifax in 1935 for £1,600 (based on increases in average earnings, this would be approximately £279,700 in 2016).

Foster's Testimonial match at Keighley took place during the 1945–46 season.

=== Representative honours ===
Foster won a cap for England while at Keighley in 1935 against France.

Foster won cap(s) for Yorkshire while at Keighley.

== Honoured at Keighley Cougars ==
Foster is a Keighley Cougars Hall of Fame inductee, inducted in November 1998.

== Funeral ==
Norman Foster funeral took place at 1.45pm on Tuesday 16 February 1999 at St Mary's Church, Riddlesden.
