= Evan Williams (rugby) =

Wales international rugby union & league footballer

Personal information
- Born: 18 June 1906 Port Talbot, Wales
- Died: 18 November 1976 (aged 70) Leeds, England

Playing information

Rugby union
- Position: Centre
Club
Years	Team	Pld	T	G	FG	P
≤1925–25	Aberavon RFC
Representative
Years	Team	Pld	T	G	FG	P
1925	Wales	2	0	0	0	0

Rugby league
- Position: Centre, Stand-off, Scrum-half
Club
Years	Team	Pld	T	G	FG	P
1925–≥39	Leeds	415	75	180	-	585
Representative
Years	Team	Pld	T	G	FG	P
1930	Other Nationalities	1	0	0	0	0

Evan Williams (18 June 1906 – 18 November 1976) was a Welsh rugby union, and professional rugby league footballer who played in the 1920s and 1930s. He played representative level rugby union (RU) for Wales, and at club level for Aberavon RFC as a centre, i.e. number 12 or 13, and club level rugby league (RL) for Leeds, as a goal-kicking centre, stand-off or scrum-half.

== Background ==
Williams was born in Port Talbot, Wales, he died aged 70 in Leeds, West Yorkshire, England.

== Playing career ==
=== International honours ===
Evan Williams won two caps for Wales (RU) while at Aberavon RFC in 1925 against England and Scotland. Evans won his first cap aged 18 which at the time made him the second youngest player to represent Wales after Norman Biggs in 1888.

=== Championship final appearances ===
Evan Williams played at centre in Leeds' 2–8 defeat by Hunslet in the Championship Final during the 1937–38 season at Elland Road, Leeds on Saturday 30 April 1938.

=== Challenge Cup Final appearances ===
Evan Williams played stand-off in Leeds' 11–8 victory over Swinton in the 1931–32 Challenge Cup Final during the 1931–32 season at Central Park, Wigan on Saturday 9 April 1932, and played scrum-half, and scored three goals in the 18–2 victory over Warrington in the 1935–36 Challenge Cup Final during the 1935–36 season at Wembley Stadium, London on Saturday 18 April 1936.

=== Club career ===
Evan Williams made his début for Leeds, and scored a try in 61-3 the victory over Bradford Northern on Saturday 7 November 1925.

== Personal life ==
Evan Williams' marriage to Eunice (née John) was registered during third ¼ 1926 in Leeds district. They had four children, Evan Rowland (birth registered during first ¼ 1927 in Leeds district), Bryan (birth registered during fourth ¼ 1929 in Leeds North district), Barrie (birth registered during second ¼ 1932 in Leeds North district), and Gwynneth A. (birth registered during fourth ¼ 1947 in Leeds district).
