= Dave Hey =

Australian rugby league footballer and administrator

Personal information
- Full name: David James Hey
- Born: 14 December 1905; St Leonards, New South Wales
- Died: 13 May 1967 (aged 61); Smithfield, New South Wales

Playing information
- Position: Centre
Club
Years	Team	Pld	T	G	FG	P
1926–29	Western Suburbs	21	5	0	0	15
1931	St. George	1	0	0	0	0
	Total	22	5	0	0	15
- Relatives: Vic Hey (brother)

David James Hey (1905–1967) was an Australian rugby league footballer who played in the 1920s and 1930s.

== Playing career ==
Hey and his brother Vic Hey both played with the Western Suburbs club although Dave was 6 years older than his famous brother.

He played three seasons with Wests, went to the bush in 1930 and had one final season with the St. George club, playing one game with them in 1931. He moved to other rural areas in the 1930s, he captain/coached Cootamundra 1932, Glen Innes 1933 and Kiama, New South Wales in 1934.

Hey was still coaching A grade in the Fairfield/Smithfield area in the 1940s.

Hey also served in World War II between 1943 and 1946.

== Death ==
Hey died at Smithfield, New South Wales on 13 May 1967.
