= Glyn Prosser =

Wales rugby union international and professional rugby league footballer

Personal information
- Full name: Idris Glyn Prosser
- Born: 27 November 1907 Glynneath, Neath Port Talbot, Wales
- Died: 13 November 1972 (aged 64) Glynneath, Wales

Playing information

Rugby union
- Position: Flanker
Club
Years	Team	Pld	T	G	FG	P
	Glynneath RFC
	Neath RFC
	Total	0	0	0	0	0
Representative
Years	Team	Pld	T	G	FG	P
1934–35	Wales	4	0	0	0	0

Rugby league
Club
Years	Team	Pld	T	G	FG	P
1936	Huddersfield	0	0	0	0	0
- As of 17 March 2021
- Education: Crown School, Glynneath
- Relatives: Dai Prosser (brother)

Glyn Prosser (27 November 1907 – 13 November 1972) was a Welsh international rugby union flanker who played club rugby for Neath, and was capped four times for Wales. An aggressive wing forward, Prosser is best known for being a member of the Wales team that beat the touring New Zealanders in 1935.

== Personal ==
He was the older brother of Dai Prosser. He was educated at Crown School, Glynneath. His occupation had been a miner.

== Rugby Union career ==
Prosser first played rugby for his home town, Glynneath, before moving to first class side Neath. It was with Neath that Prosser first played against international opposition, when he was chosen for a joint Neath / Aberavon team to face the touring South Africans in 1931. It was a very close game that was 3-3, when in a final attack, the South Africans scored the winning try.

Prosser trialled for the Wales team as early as the 1931/32 season but did not gain his first cap until the 1934 Home Nations Championship, when he was selected to face England. The match was played at the Cardiff Arms Park under the captaincy of first time international John Evans, and the inexperienced Welsh team were poor in comparison to England. Out of 13 new caps on the day, five, including Evans, never played for Wales again, but Prosser returned in the next two games of the tournament, now led by the more reliable Claude Davey. Although Wales won these two games, Prosser was not reselected for the next years Championship.

In 1935, Prosser was given another chance to face international tourist when Neath joined up with Aberavon again to face the touring All Blacks. Although the joint team lost to New Zealand Prosser brought his familiar style of offensive forward play through the All Black back division, and did enough to gain the favour of the Welsh selectors. Prosser played his final game for Wales one week later when he was chosen to face the same touring New Zealanders. It was a famous win for Wales, even though they lost their hooker with a broken neck ten minutes before the end of the game.

== Rugby League career ==
In 1936, Prosser severed his ties with rugby union by signing for professional rugby league club Huddersfield.

== International matches played ==
Wales

- England 1934
- Ireland 1934
- Scotland 1934
- New Zealand 1935

== Bibliography ==
- Billot, John (1972). All Blacks in Wales. Ferndale: Ron Jones Publications.
- Billot, John (1974). Springboks in Wales. Ferndale: Ron Jones Publications.
- Godwin, Terry (1984). The International Rugby Championship 1883-1983. London: Willows Books. ISBN 0-00-218060-X.
- Smith, David; Williams, Gareth (1980). Fields of Praise: The Official History of The Welsh Rugby Union. Cardiff: University of Wales Press. ISBN 0-7083-0766-3.
