= Eric Harris (rugby league) =

Australian rugby league footballer and coach

Personal information
- Born: 22 August 1909 Toowoomba, Queensland, Australia
- Died: unknown

Playing information
- Position: Wing
Club
Years	Team	Pld	T	G	FG	P
1927–30	Wests (Brisbane)
1930–39	Leeds	386	393	16	0	1211
	Total	386	393	16	0	1211
Representative
Years	Team	Pld	T	G	FG	P
1929–41	Queensland	11	8	0		24
1933	Other Nationalities	1	2	0	0	6
1937	British Empire	1

Coaching information
Representative
Years	Team	Gms	W	D	L	W%
1964	Queensland	2	0	0	2	0

Eric Harris (22 August 1909 – death unknown), also known by the nickname of "Toowoomba Ghost", was an Australian professional rugby league footballer who played in the 1920s and 1930s. He played as a wing, at representative level for Queensland and British Empire, and at club level for Western Suburbs (Brisbane) and Leeds.

== Playing career ==
=== Championship final appearances ===
Harris played on the wing in Leeds' 2–8 defeat by Hunslet in the Championship Final during the 1937–38 season at Elland Road, Leeds on Saturday 30 April 1938.

=== County Cup Final appearances ===
Harris played on the wing in Leeds' 14–8 victory over Huddersfield in the 1937–38 Yorkshire Cup Final during the 1937–38 season at Belle Vue, Wakefield on Saturday 30 October 1937.

== Records and legacy ==
Harris holds a number of try scoring records at Leeds, including most tries scored in a season (63), and highest career total of tries with the club (392).

Harris also jointly holds Leeds' "Tries In A Match" record, with eight tries scored against Bradford Northern. His sequence of 36 tries in 17 consecutive matches for Leeds is a joint record in British rugby league, equalled only by Luke Briscoe for Featherstone Rovers in 2018.

In 2019, Harris was inducted into the Leeds Rhinos Hall of Fame.

== Baseball ==
Eric Harris was one of the most successful of the Rugby League players who did summer seasons in the semi-professional baseball leagues in the north of England during the second half of the 1930s. He played for Leeds Oaks in 1936, 1937, and 1938. He also played baseball for Yorkshire.

== Outside rugby league ==
Eric Harris became a teacher at the new Carnegie Physical Training College in Leeds, married a lady from Leeds, but returned to Australia at the start of World War II.

Sporting positions
Preceded by Ted Verrenkamp; 1960–1963	Coach Queensland; 1964	Succeeded by Ian Doyle; 1965–1967
