= Harry Royal =

Wales international rugby league footballer & coach

Personal information
- Full name: Thomas Harry Royal
- Born: 19 February 1914 Bridgend, Wales
- Died: 1995 (aged 81)

Playing information

Rugby union
Club
Years	Team	Pld	T	G	FG	P
≤1936–≤36	Blaengarw RFC
≤1936–36	Bridgend RFC
	Total	0	0	0	0	0

Rugby league
- Position: Scrum-half
Club
Years	Team	Pld	T	G	FG	P
1936–39	Huddersfield
1939–49	Dewsbury
1949–50	Batley	26	2	0	0	6
	Total	26	2	0	0	6
Representative
Years	Team	Pld	T	G	FG	P
1948	Wales	2

Coaching information
Club
Years	Team	Gms	W	D	L	W%
1949–50	Batley

Thomas Harry Royal (19 February 1914 – 1995) was a Welsh rugby union, and professional rugby league footballer who played in the 1930s, 1940s and 1950s, and coached rugby league in the 1940s and 1950s. He played representative level rugby union (RU) for Welsh Schoolboys, and Glamorgan County RFC, and at club level for Blaengarw RFC (in Blaengarw, Bridgend), and Bridgend RFC, and representative level rugby league (RL) for Wales, and at club level for Huddersfield, Dewsbury (captain), and Batley (captain), as a scrum-half and coached club level rugby league (RL) for Batley.

== Background ==
Harry Royal's birth was registered in Bridgend, Wales.

He was the landlord of the Craven Heifer Hotel public house (now a residential building), Victoria Road (now renamed), Springfield, Dewsbury, he opened a boys' sports club in the upper-room of the Craven Heifer Hotel, funded by a mile of pennies that were donated in Springfield area of Dewsbury, and he died aged 81.

== Playing career ==
=== International honours ===
Harry Royal had a trial for Wales (RU) while at Bridgend RFC in the second Welsh trial at Swansea during December 1936, and won caps for Wales (RL) while at Dewsbury; he played scrum-half in the 9-12 defeat by France in the 1948–49 European Rugby League Championship match at St. Helen's Rugby and Cricket Ground, Swansea on Saturday 23 October 1948, in front of a crowd of 12,032, and played scrum-half in the 5-12 defeat by Australia in the 1948–49 Kangaroo tour of Great Britain and France match at St. Helen's Rugby and Cricket Ground, Swansea on Saturday 20 November 1948, in front of a crowd of 9,224.

=== Championship final appearances ===
Harry Royal played scrum-half in Dewsbury's 14-25 aggregate defeat by Wigan in the Championship Final during the 1943–44 season; Tom Walsh played scrum-half in the 9-13 first-leg defeat at Central Park, Wigan on Saturday 13 May 1944, but Royal played scrum-half in the 5-12 second-leg defeat at Crown Flatt, Dewsbury on Saturday 20 May 1944, and played scrum-half in the 4-13 defeat by Wigan in the Championship Final during the 1946–47 season at Maine Road, Manchester on Saturday 21 June 1947.

=== Club career ===
Harry Royal was transferred from Dewsbury to Batley, becoming player-coach on Wednesday 2 November 1949, he played his first match for Batley against Huddersfield in the Championship match during the 1949–50 season at Mount Pleasant, Batley on Saturday 12 November 1949, but this match was abandoned with Batley losing 0-4, this match was later replayed on Tuesday 4 April 1950, so this original fixture does not count toward official records. Therefore, his official début for Batley was the 23-5 victory over Featherstone Rovers at Post Office Road, Featherstone on Saturday 19 November 1949, and he played his last match for Batley in the 3-5 defeat by Oldham during the 1950–51 season at the Watersheddings, Oldham on Saturday 4 November 1950.

== Coaching career ==
=== Club career ===
Harry Royal was the coach of Batley from November 1949 to November 1950, Batley finished the 1949–50 season in 25th position out of 29-teams, with 10-victories, and 26-defeats, for 20-points, they reached the second-round of the 1949–50 Yorkshire Cup, losing 5-12 to eventual losing semi-finalists Dewsbury at Crown Flatt, Dewsbury on Thursday 29 September 1949, and they reached the second-round of the 1949–50 Challenge Cup, losing 4-12 to eventual losing finalists Widnes at Mount Pleasant, Batley on Thursday 2 March 1950.
