= 1940–41 Challenge Cup =

Rugby league competition

- Duration: 5 rounds
- Number of teams: 21
- Winners: Leeds
- Runners-up: Halifax
- Biggest home win: 64–5 by Hunslet vs Liverpool Stanley
- Biggest away win: 0–22 by Wakefield Trinity vs Batley

The 1940–41 Challenge Cup was the 40th staging of rugby league's oldest knockout competition, the Challenge Cup. The competition was re-introduced after a season’s absence. The competition was won by Leeds who beat Halifax 19–2 in the final on 17 May 1941.

At the August 1940 rugby league council meeting it was proposed the complete the league season, play the county cup competitions and then finish the season with the Challenge Cup. A decision on the structure of the Challenge Cup was deferred at the December meeting of the council but in January the dates for the competition were finalised. The competition was to be played on consecutive weekends commencing 12 April 1941, there would be three rounds then the four teams in the semi-finals would play on a home and away two-legged basis on the first two weekends in May 1941 with the final on a neutral venue on 17 May. Players were not allowed to play for more than one club in the competition and there were to be no replays. Extra time of 20 minutes was to be played and in the event of the scores still being level then the game would continue until one team scored. Medals would not be presented to the players in the final, instead war savings certificates (Note: War savings certificates had a face value of 15 shillings and attracted interest until they were worth 20s 6d after 10 years. The value of the prizes to the players was therefore £3 to the winning team's players and £2 5s to the members of the losing team.) were to be awarded, four to each player on the winning team and three to each player on the losing team.

Invitations to all 27 member clubs, even those who had not played in the league this season, were distributed in February 1941 and by the date of the draw 21 clubs had entered. Hull Kingston Rovers, Widnes, Barrow and Rochdale Hornets who had not participated in the league at all in 1940–41 declined to enter; Salford and Warrington who had played some or all of the league games but had both suspended operations in January 1941 also declined to take part in the Cup. So that clubs could make the necessary travel arrangements the first three rounds were all drawn on 26 March 1941; the first round consisting of five ties involving 10 clubs. The remaining 11 clubs were given a bye into the second round of eight matches.

== First round ==
The five first-round ties were all played on Saturday 12 April 1941. The extra-time rules imposed for the competition had an immediate use as the game between Featherstone Rovers and Castleford took until the 118th minute of play to conclude. After 80 minutes the score was 3–3 and during extra-time both teams scored a goal to finish 5–5 after 100 minutes of play. A further 18 minutes had been played before Castleford's Jim Croston scored the decisive try that gave Castleford an 8–5 victory.

Home	Score	Away	Venue
Featherstone Rovers	5–8	Castleford	Post Office Road
Halifax	24–12	Broughton Rangers	Thrum Hall
Hunslet	18–8	Leigh	Parkside
Oldham	9–13	Dewsbury	Watersheddings
Wakefield Trinity	25–0	Keighley	Belle Vue

== Second round ==
The eight second round ties were played on Saturday 19 April.

Home	Score	Away	Venue
Batley	9–8	Hull F.C.	Mount Pleasant
Bradford Northern	25–8	Swinton	Odsal Stadium
Castleford	21–13	St Helens	Wheldon Road
Dewsbury	5–6	Leeds	Crown Flatt
Huddersfield	60–7	Bramley	Fartown
Hunslet	64–5	Liverpool Stanley	Parkside
Wakefield Trinity	22–0	Wigan	Belle Vue
York	6–13	Halifax	Clarence Street

== Third round ==
The third round ties were played on 26 April 1941

Home	Score	Away	Venue
Batley	0–22	Wakefield Trinity	Mount Pleasant
Bradford Northern	18–4	Castleford	Odsal Stadium
Halifax	10–5	Huddersfield	Thrum Hall
Hunslet	10–17	Leeds	Parkside

== Semi-finals ==
The semi-finals were played at the beginning of May on Saturday 3 and Saturday 10 May 1941. Halifax beat Wakefield Trinity 16–12 on aggregate and Leeds beat Bradford 22–12 on aggregate.

leg	Home	Score	Away	Venue	Attendance	Receipts
1st	Halifax	11–2	Wakefield Trinity	Thrum Hall	7,752	£377
2nd	Wakefield Trinity	10–5	Halifax	Belle Vue	7,000	£405
1st	Leeds	10–10	Bradford Northern	Headingley Stadium	16,000	£835
2nd	Bradford Northern	2–12	Leeds	Odsal Stadium	22,500	£1,212
Source:1st leg 2nd leg

== Final ==
17 May 1941
3:30 pm BST (UTC+01:00)

Leeds	19 – 2	Halifax
Tries: Jenkins, Hey (2), Lawrenson (2); Goals: Eaton (2)		Goals: Meek

Odsal Stadium, Bradford
Attendance: 28,500
Referee: P. Cowell

Leeds	Position	Halifax
Eaton	FB	Bassett
Batten (Note: Guest players from Hunslet)	WG	Bevan
Evans	CE	Smith
Hey	CE	Rule
Lawrensen (Note: Guest player from Wigan)	WG	Doyle
Morris	SO	Todd
Jenkins	SH	McCue (Note: Guest players from Widnes)
Prosser	PR	Osborne (Note: Guest player from Salford)
Murphy	HK	Meek
Bennett	PR	Irving
Satterthwaite	SR	Millington
Pearson (Note: Guest player from Bramley)	SR	Brereton
Tattersfield	LF	Beverley

The final was played at Bradford's Odsal Stadium on Saturday 17 May 1941. Both teams featured a number of guest players (Note: At the outbreak of the war the Rugby Football League authorised players to play for any club with the permission of the club they were registered with. This was to alleviate travelling for players who make have been working away from home on war-work.)

A crowd of 28,500 saw Leeds take a half-time lead 5–2 through a Jenkins try and an Eaton goal with Meek kicking a goal for Halifax. In the second half Leeds scored a further four tries with Lawrenson and Hey scoring two each to which Eaton added another goal. Halifax's cause wasn't helped by the loss of loose forward Beverley through injury part way through the half; with no substitutions allowed it meant Halifax had to play the last 15 minutes with only 12 players.
