= Fred Harris (rugby league) =

English rugby league footballer (1909–1980)

Personal information
- Full name: Frederick Harris
- Born: 27 November 1909 Leigh, England
- Died: July 1980 (aged 70) Bradford, England

Playing information
- Position: Wing, Centre
Club
Years	Team	Pld	T	G	FG	P
1930–35	Leigh	140	46	1		140
≤1936–45	Leeds	199	71			214
	Total	339	117	1	0	354
Representative
Years	Team	Pld	T	G	FG	P
≤1937–≥37	Lancashire	≥1
1934–35	English League XIII	2	2	2	0	10
1934–37	England	2	0	0	0	0
≤1936–≥36	Great Britain	0

Frederick "Fred" Harris (27 November 1909 – July 1980) was an English professional rugby league footballer who played in the 1930s and 1940s. He played at representative level for Great Britain (non-Test matches), England, English League XIII and Lancashire, and at club level for Leigh, and Leeds, as a wing or centre.

== Playing career ==
=== International honours ===
Harris won caps for England while at Leigh in 1934 against Australia, and while at Leeds in 1937 against France, was selected for Great Britain while at Leeds for the 1936 Great Britain Lions tour of Australia and New Zealand, and played for English League XIII while at Leigh against France.

=== County honours ===
Harris played at centre in Lancashire's 7-5 victory over Australia in the 1937–38 Kangaroo tour match at Wilderspool Stadium, Warrington on Wednesday 29 September 1937, in front of a crowd of 16,250.

=== County Cup Final appearances ===
Harris played at centre in Leeds' 14-8 victory over Huddersfield in the 1937–38 Yorkshire Cup Final during the 1937–38 season at Belle Vue, Wakefield on Saturday 30 October 1937.
