= David Jenkins (rugby, born 1914) =

GB & Wales international rugby league footballer

Personal information
- Full name: David Jenkins
- Born: 23 February 1914 Treherbert, Wales
- Died: 1979 (aged 64–65)

Playing information

Rugby union
Club
Years	Team	Pld	T	G	FG	P
	Cardiff RFC

Rugby league
- Position: Scrum-half
Club
Years	Team	Pld	T	G	FG	P
≤1936	Streatham and Mitcham
1936–≥49	Leeds	292	55	7	0	179
1949–51	Keighley	0	0	0	0	0
1951	Bramley RLFC	0	0	0	0	0
	Total	292	55	7	0	179
Representative
Years	Team	Pld	T	G	FG	P
1938–48	Wales	17	0	0	0	0
1942	Rugby League XIII	1	0	0	0	0
1947	Great Britain	1	1	0	0	3

Coaching information
Club
Years	Team	Gms	W	D	L	W%
1951–57	Bramley RLFC	0	0	0	0

David "Dai" Jenkins (23 February 1914 – 1979) initially played rugby union. He changed codes when he was 21 and played rugby league between 1935-1957, mainly for Leeds Rugby League Club as a scrum-half.

== Background ==
David Jenkins was born in Treherbert, Wales.

== Playing career ==
He was a member of the Great Britain side that toured Australia and New Zealand in 1946. This was known as the Indomitables tour.

=== Junior/Amateur Game ===
As a 10 year old in 1924 Dai Jenkins played hooker for Penyrenglyn School XV, Treherbert and in 1927/28 Dai was vice-captain and scrum half when his team won the Welsh schools Rugby Union Championship.

In 1928 Dai played for Wales v England in the Schoolboy R.U. Internationals at Cardiff and Coventry and played Association Football as a centre forward with a local junior team for 2 years after leaving school.

=== Domestic career ===
In 1935 Dai Jenkins signed for Acton and Willesden and played his first Rugby League game against Featherstone at Post Office Road.

In May 1936 Dai left Action & Willesden and joined Streatham & Mitcham Rugby League Club playing for them until Dec 1936. He then transferred (with Con Murphy) to Leeds Rugby League Club. Dai and Con were transferred for a joint transfer fee of £600. His first match for Leeds was against Bradford Northern at Headingley on 2 January 1937.

=== Challenge Cup, Championship & Yorkshire Cup appearances ===
In 1937, Dai played for Leeds against Wigan in the League Championship semi-final of 1937 and again for Leeds in the 1938 Rugby League Championship final against Hunslet, at Elland Road.

Dai Jenkins played in four rugby league Challenge Cup Finals: He played scrum-half in Leeds' 19–2 victory over Halifax in the 1940–41 Challenge Cup Final during the 1940–41 season at Odsal Stadium, Bradford. Also in the 15–10 victory over Halifax in the 1941–42 Challenge Cup Final during the 1941–42 season at Odsal Stadium, Bradford; in the Leeds v Dewsbury final in 1943 and in the 1947 Leeds v Bradford Northern final at Wembley losing 8–4.

Dai played for Leeds in the 1947 Yorkshire Cup Final against Wakefield Trinity at Fartown. The match ended in a 7–7 draw. The match was re-played at Odsal where Wakefield Trinity beat Leeds 8-7.

=== Wartime (Domestic games) ===
Dai Jenkins played for Yorkshire and the Probables (players who would probably have toured Australia in 1940) in several matches in Yorkshire and Lancashire.

- 1940 Feb, played for the Probables against the 1936 Tourists in a Red Cross Fund match at Salford
- 1940 Mar, played for Yorkshire against a Lancashire side at Barrow.
- 1940 May, played for the Probables against the 1936 Tourists in a Red Cross Fund match at Salford.
- 1942 Mar, played for a Rugby Leagues XIII against Northern Command.
- 1942, Mar, played for Yorkshire against Lancashire at Crown Flatts, Dewsbury
- 1943, May, played in a 7-a-side competition at Headingley

=== Later domestic career ===
Dai Jenkins captained Leeds RLFC sometime during the 1948-49 season.

In 1949 Dai Jenkins shared a Testimonial match with Dai Prosser at Leeds. In the same year, Dai Jenkins broke his collarbone.

Dai left Leeds to join Keighley RLFC in 1949 and played for them until 1951. The last move of his playing career was to Bramley RLFC where Dai was player-coach, and then coach between 1951 and 1957.

=== International career ===
In the 1937-1938 season Dai Jenkins was awarded a Welsh International cap when he played for Wales against England at Newcastle.

He represented Wales against England at Llanelli in the European Rugby League championship on 5 November 1938 and again in a friendly match at Odsal on 23 December 1939.

Also in 1938 Dai Jenkins played for Wales against France and is reputed to have swapped his shirt with one of the French players (no 7). A France International shirt is in the Heritage Quay collection.

In 1938, Dai toured France, as a guest player, with the Hunslet Rugby League team.

=== Wartime (International Games) ===
During WW2, Dai represented Wales in a variety of rugby league matches:

- 1940 Nov, Oldham
- 1941 Odsal
- 1943 Feb, Wigan

=== Indomitable's Tour ===
In Apr 1946, Dai Jenkins was selected to join that year’s highly successful Rugby League tour of Australia and New Zealand. This was the first overseas tour since the end of the war. The touring squad became known as the 'Indomitables' as they had travelled to the tour on board HMS Indomitable.

The tourists played 18 matches, 17 in Australia, 1 in New Zealand from 22 May to 10 August 1946 and Dai played in the no 15 shirt on the tour.

The team and officials returned to the UK on RMS Rangitiki

== Quotes relating to Dai Jenkins ==
"Jenkins would tackle anything from a charging elephant to a whippet tank." (a small, fast tank of WW1)

Dai Jenkins said "his greatest football thrill was at Huddersfield in the 1947 Cup semi-final v Wakefield, when Leeds won through to Wembley"

== Personal life ==
Dai was the son of Richard Jenkins and wife Rachel (nee Howells) who married 1909 (Q3) in Pontypridd Registration district. David’s siblings included sisters Margaret (b. 1910) Deilwen (b. 1920) and brothers Elwyn (b. 1925) and Venner (b. 1927). His father, Richard, played Rugby League for Hull and died before 1935.

Dai Jenkins was born 23 February 1914 in Treherbert, South Wales. He married Edna Fox in the Leeds North Registration District, Q1 1939 and they lived part of their early married life at 7 Ashville Grove, Leeds 6. By 27 January 1940 they were living at 24 Beechwood Mount, Burley, Leeds.

From c. 1940 – aft. 1947 Dai took over as licensee of the Town Hall Tavern, 17 Westgate, Leeds (near the Headrow) from Ken Jubb who was also a Leeds Rugby League player.

Dai and Edna’s son David was born in 1942, Pontypridd registration district.

Dai died, aged 65, 1979 Q4, in Leeds Registration district.
