= Tom Walsh (rugby league, Castleford) =

English rugby league footballer

Personal information
- Full name: Thomas Walsh
- Born: unknown
- Died: unknown

Playing information
- Position: Scrum-half
Club
Years	Team	Pld	T	G	FG	P
1933–35	Leigh	67	16	43	0	134
1936–55	Castleford	112	26	20	5	128
≤1944–≥44	→ Dewsbury (guest)	≥1
	Total		42	63	5	262

Tom Walsh (birth unknown – death unknown), also known by the nickname of "Tot", was a professional rugby league footballer who played in the 1930s, 1940s and 1950s. He played at club level for Leigh, Castleford, and Dewsbury (World War II guest), as a goal-kicking scrum-half.

== Playing career ==
=== Championship final appearances ===
Tom Walsh played scrum-half in Dewsbury's 14-25 aggregate defeat by Wigan in the Championship Final during the 1943–44 season; Walsh played scrum-half, and scored a try, and three goals (1-goal, and 2-penalty goals) in the 9-13 first-leg defeat at Central Park, Wigan on Saturday 13 May 1944, but Harry Royal played scrum-half in the 5-12 second-leg defeat at Crown Flatt, Dewsbury on Saturday 20 May 1944.

=== County League appearances ===
Tom Walsh played in Castleford's victory in the Yorkshire League during the 1938–39 season.
