= Newcastle RLFC =

Defunct English rugby league club, based in Newcastle-upon-tyne

Newcastle was a semi-professional rugby league club based in Newcastle upon Tyne in North East England.

The club played semi-professional rugby league for two seasons, 1936–37 and 1937–38, possibly joining direct from non-league. They left the league at the end of season 1937–38.

== History ==
There had been several rugby league teams based on Tyneside since the great rugby schism that resulted in the formation of rugby league. Wallsend RFC were an early non-league club and South Shields tried their luck, with the semi-professionals in the second division of the Rugby League in 1902-03 and 1903-04, neither club with any great success.

Newcastle Rugby League FC joined the Rugby League for the 1936–37 season. The Pathe news cameras were out when Newcastle Rugby League FC opened their home programme with a great fanfare. The match was attended by many dignitaries including the Lord Mayor of Newcastle, This first match, played against Huddersfield on 7th Sept 1936, resulted in a 12-33 loss.

In their first season, 1936–37 Newcastle finished a lowly 29th out of 30 clubs, with only Featherstone Rovers below them.

In their second and last season, 1937–38 they again finished second bottom, 28th out of 29 clubs, this time with Bramley below them.

Newcastle Rugby Club left the league at the end of season 1937–38.

== Notable players ==
Notable players for Newcastle included; Tom Askin, James Cumberbatch, Norman Foster, and Emlyn Jenkins.

== Stadium ==
In their first season in the league the club played at Brough Park Stadium which was also a speedway and greyhound racing track. The following season the club moved to the new White City Stadium in Blaydon on Tyne, Gateshead.

== Club league record ==
Newcastle's record for the 2 full years in which they played semi-professional rugby league:

Season	Competition	Pos	Team Name	Pl	W	D	L	PW	PA	Diff	Pts	% Pts	No of teams in league	Notes	Ref
1936–37	RL	29	Newcastle	38	5	1	32	300	890	-590	11		30		
1937–38	RL	28	Newcastle	36	2	4	30	206	750	-544	8		29		

Heading Abbreviations
RL = Single Division; Pl = Games played; W = Win; D = Draw; L = Lose; PF = Points for; PA = Points against; Diff = Points difference (+ or -); Pts = League points
% Pts = A percentage system was used to determine league positions due to clubs playing varying number of fixtures and against different opponents
League points: for win = 2; for draw = 1; for loss = 0.

== See also ==
- List of defunct rugby league clubs
