= Tom Kenny (rugby league) =

England international rugby league footballer

Personal information
- Full name: Thomas Kenny

Playing information
- Position: Stand-off
Club
Years	Team	Pld	T	G	FG	P
1933–39	Broughton Rangers		89
1939–44	Salford
1944–46	Dewsbury
1946–49	Belle Vue Rangers
	Total	0	89	0	0	0
Representative
Years	Team	Pld	T	G	FG	P
1939	England	1	0	0	0	0

Thomas Kenny was an English professional rugby league footballer who played in the 1930s and 1940s. He played at representative level for England, and at club level for Broughton Rangers and Salford, as a stand-off.

== Playing career ==
=== Club career ===
Kenny was signed by Broughton Rangers from rugby union club Seghill RFC in October 1933.

He was transferred to Salford for a club record fee, making his debut for the club in January 1939. He played in the 1939 Challenge Cup final defeat against Halifax at Wembley, and helped Salford win the 1938–39 Championship final against Castleford at Maine Road.

During the Second World War, Salford withdrew from the league due to financial difficulties, and Kenny made several guest appearances for Dewsbury and Leeds. He was transferred to Dewsbury on a permanent basis in 1944. In August 1946, he returned to his original league club, now known as Belle Vue Rangers due to their relocation.

=== International honours ===
Tom Kenny won a cap for England while at Salford in 1939 against Wales.
