= Laurie Thacker =

England international rugby league footballer

Lawrence Thacker
Personal information
- Full name: Lawrence William Thacker
- Born: 19 or, 20 March 1909 Sculcoates district, England
- Died: 2 March 1952 (aged 42) Driffield, England

Playing information
- Position: Prop
Club
Years	Team	Pld	T	G	FG	P
1933–46	Hull F.C.
Representative
Years	Team	Pld	T	G	FG	P
1936–39	Yorkshire	4	0	0	0	0
1937	British Empire
1938–41	England	4	1	0	0	3

Lawrence William Thacker (19 or 20 March 1909 – 2 March 1952) was an English professional rugby league footballer who played in the 1930s and 1940s. He played at representative level for England, British Empire and Yorkshire, and at club level for Hull F.C., as a prop.

== Background ==
Laurie Thacker was born in Sculcoates, East Riding of Yorkshire, England and he died aged 42 in Driffield, East Riding of Yorkshire, England.

== Playing career ==
=== International honours ===
Thacker represented British Empire while at Hull in 1937 against France, and won caps for England while at Hull in 1938 against France, and Wales, in 1939 against France, and in 1941 against Wales.

=== County Cup Final appearances ===
Thacker played at prop in Hull F.C.'s 10-18 defeat by Huddersfield in the 1938 Yorkshire Cup Final during the 1938–39 season at Odsal Stadium, Bradford on Saturday 22 October 1938.

=== Other notable matches ===
Thacker played at prop for a Rugby League XIII against Northern Command XIII at Thrum Hall, Halifax on Saturday 21 March 1942.
