= Johnny Lawrenson =

English RL coach and former GB & England international rugby league footballer

John Lawrenson
Personal information
- Full name: John H. Lawrenson
- Born: 29 March 1921
- Died: 28 March 2010 (aged 88)

Playing information
- Position: Wing
Club
Years	Team	Pld	T	G	FG	P
1938–49	Wigan	219	187	128	0	817
1940–41	Leeds (guest)	1	2	0	0	6
1949–53	Workington Town	145	110	73	0	476
	Total	365	299	201	0	1299
Representative
Years	Team	Pld	T	G	FG	P
1939–50	England	9	0	0	0	0
1948–49	Great Britain	3	2	0	0	6

Coaching information
Club
Years	Team	Gms	W	D	L	W%
1961	Wigan

John H. Lawrenson (29 March 1921 – 28 March 2010) was an English professional rugby league footballer who played in the 1930s, 1940s and 1950s, and coached in the 1960s. He played at representative level for Great Britain and England, and at club level for Wigan, Leeds (World War II guest), and Workington Town, as a wing, and coached at club level for Wigan (caretaker).

== Playing career ==
=== International honours ===
Lawrenson won caps for England while at Wigan in 1939 against Wales, in 1940 against Wales, in 1941 against Wales, in 1946 against Wales (2 matches), in 1948 against Wales, and France, in 1949 against Wales, and Other Nationalities, while at Workington in 1950, and for Great Britain while at Wigan in 1948 against Australia (3 matches).

=== Championship final appearances ===
Lawrenson played at centre, and scored a goal in Wigan's 13-9 victory over Dewsbury in the Championship Final first-leg during the 1943–44 season at Central Park, Wigan on Saturday 13 May 1944, and played at centre in the 12-5 victory over Dewsbury in the Championship Final second-leg during the 1943–44 season at Crown Flatt, Dewsbury on Saturday 20 May 1944.

=== Challenge Cup Final appearances ===
Lawrenson played on the wing in Leeds' 19-2 victory over Halifax in the 1940–41 Challenge Cup Final during the 1940–41 season at Odsal Stadium, Bradford, in front of a crowd of 28,500, and played on the wing, scoring two tries in Workington Town's 18-10 victory over Featherstone Rovers in the 1951–52 Challenge Cup Final during the 1951–52 season at Wembley Stadium, London on Saturday 19 April 1952, in front of a crowd of 72,093.

=== County Cup Final appearances ===
Lawrenson played at centre, and scored 3-goals in Wigan's 9-3 victory over Belle Vue Rangers in the 1946–47 Lancashire Cup Final during the 1946–47 season at Station Road, Swinton on Saturday 26 October 1946, and played on the wing in the 14-8 victory over Warrington in the 1948–49 Lancashire Cup Final during the 1948–49 season at Station Road, Swinton on Saturday 13 November 1948.

=== Career records ===
Lawrenson holds Workington Town's "Most Tries In A Season" record, with 49-tries scored in the 1951–52 season.

== Honoured at Wigan ==
Lawrenson was a life member at Wigan.
