= Con Murphy (rugby, born 1908) =

Wales dual-code international rugby footballer

Personal information
- Full name: Cornelius Denis Murphy
- Born: 3 September 1908 Aberfan, Wales
- Died: 13 July 1964 (aged 55) Leeds, England

Playing information

Rugby union
- Position: Hooker
Club
Years	Team	Pld	T	G	FG	P
	Ynysddu RFC
≤1935–35	Cross Keys RFC
	Total	0	0	0	0	0
Representative
Years	Team	Pld	T	G	FG	P
1935	Wales	3	0	0	0	0

Rugby league
- Position: Hooker
Club
Years	Team	Pld	T	G	FG	P
1935–36	Acton and Willesden
1936–37	Streatham and Mitcham
1937–47	Leeds
	Total	0	0	0	0	0
Representative
Years	Team	Pld	T	G	FG	P
1939–44	Wales	5

Cornelius "Con" Denis Murphy (3 September 1908 – 13 July 1964) was a Welsh dual-code international rugby union, and professional rugby league footballer who played in the 1930s and 1940s. He played representative level rugby union (RU) for Wales, and at club level for Ynysddu RFC and Cross Keys RFC, as a hooker, and representative level rugby league (RL) for Wales, and at club level for Acton and Willesden, Streatham and Mitcham and Leeds, as a hooker, .

== Background ==
Con Murphy was born in Aberfan, Wales, and he died aged 55 in Leeds, West Riding of Yorkshire, England.

== Playing career ==
=== Club career ===
Murphy played hooker in Leeds' 14-8 victory over Huddersfield in the 1937–38 Yorkshire Cup Final at Belle Vue, Wakefield on Saturday 30 October 1937.

Murphy played hooker in Leeds' 2-8 defeat by Hunslet in the Championship Final at Elland Road, Leeds on Saturday 30 April 1938.

Murphy played hooker in Leeds' 19-2 victory over Halifax in the 1940–41 Challenge Cup Final at Odsal Stadium, Bradford, in front of a crowd of 28,500, and played hooker in the 15–10 victory over Halifax in the 1941–42 Challenge Cup Final at Odsal Stadium, Bradford, in front of a crowd of 15,250.

=== International honours ===
Murphy won caps for Wales (RU) while at Cross Keys RFC in 1935 against England, Scotland, and Ireland, and won caps for Wales (RL) while at Leeds 1939...1944 5-caps.
