= 1937–38 Northern Rugby Football League season =

- League: Northern Rugby Football League
- Teams: 29

RFL Championship
- Champions: Hunslet
- League Leaders: Hunslet
- Top point-scorer: Jim Sullivan 285
- Top try-scorer: Eric Harris 45

The 1937–38 Rugby Football League season was the 43rd season of rugby league football.

== Season summary ==
Hunslet won their second, and to date last, Championship when they defeated Leeds 8-2 in the play-off final. They had also finished the regular season as the league leaders. The final was due to have taken place at Belle Vue, Wakefield, but as both clubs were from Leeds, the Rugby Football League switched the match to Elland Road in Leeds, with the final being played on 30 April 1938 in front of a crowd of 54,112.

The Challenge Cup Winners were Salford who beat Barrow 7-4 in the final.

Warrington won the Lancashire League, and Leeds won the Yorkshire League. Warrington beat Barrow 8–4 to win the Lancashire County Cup, and Leeds beat Huddersfield 14–8 to win the Yorkshire County Cup.

== Championship ==
	Team	Pld	W	D	L	PF	PA	Pts
1	Hunslet	36	25	3	8	459	301	53
2	Leeds	36	25	2	9	530	227	52
3	Swinton	36	24	2	10	392	198	50
4	Barrow	36	25	0	11	447	260	50
5	Warrington	36	23	1	12	534	286	47
6	Salford	36	23	1	12	493	293	47
7	Castleford	36	23	1	12	481	320	47
8	Widnes	36	22	2	12	475	210	46
9	Wigan	36	22	1	13	478	329	45
10	Wakefield Trinity	36	21	3	12	476	346	45
11	Oldham	36	21	2	13	392	276	44
12	Bradford Northern	36	20	4	12	439	355	44
13	Hull	36	19	3	14	479	364	41
14	Halifax	36	19	2	15	531	393	40
15	Batley	36	17	2	17	392	367	36
16	Keighley	36	17	2	17	267	318	36
17	Liverpool Stanley	36	17	1	18	284	324	35
18	York	36	15	5	16	381	492	35
19	Broughton Rangers	36	16	2	18	394	413	34
20	Dewsbury	36	15	1	20	388	407	31
21	St. Helens	36	14	3	19	370	476	31
22	St Helens Recs	36	15	1	20	353	471	31
23	Huddersfield	36	14	1	21	499	502	29
24	Hull Kingston Rovers	36	13	1	22	354	476	27
25	Rochdale Hornets	36	9	1	26	338	567	19
26	Featherstone Rovers	36	8	2	26	311	606	18
27	Leigh	36	7	3	26	203	597	17
28	Newcastle	36	2	4	30	206	750	8
29	Bramley	36	2	2	32	221	643	6

== Championship play-off ==
Semi-finals
1	Hunslet	13
4	Barrow	7
2	Leeds	5
3	Swinton	2

Championship final
Hunslet	8
Leeds	2

=== Final ===
30 April 1938

Hunslet	8 – 2	Leeds
Tries: Winter, O'Sullivan; Goals: Walkington		Goals: Tattersfield

Elland Road, Leeds
Attendance: 54,112
Referee: F. Fairhurst (Wigan)

Hunslet	Number	Leeds
	Teams	
Jack Walkington	1	Charlie Eaton
Eric Batten	2	Eric Harris
Cyril Morrell	3	Evan Williams
Ernest Winter	4	Stan Brogden
James O'Sullivan	5	Stan Smith
Oliver Morris	6	Vic Hey
Billy Thornton	7	Dai Jenkins
Mark Tolson	8	Stan Satterthwaite
Les White	9	Con Murphy
Eddie Bennett	10	Dai Prosser
Sam Newbould	11	Harry Dyer
Colin Stansfield	12	Ted Tattersfield
Cyril Plenderleith	13	William Duffy
	Coach	Dai Prosser

== Challenge Cup ==
Salford beat Barrow 7-4 in the final played at Wembley on Saturday 7 May 1938 in front of a crowd of 51,243. This was the lowest winning score in a Wembley final, only equalled in 1970.

This was Salford’s first Challenge Cup Final win in their fourth Final appearance.

This was Barrow’s first appearance in the Final.

== Sources ==
- 1937-38 Rugby Football League season at wigan.rlfans.com
- The Challenge Cup at The Rugby Football League website
