= 1942–43 Challenge Cup =

Rugby league cup competition

- Duration: 4 rounds
- Winners: Dewsbury
- Runners-up: Leeds

The 1942–43 Challenge Cup was the 42nd staging of rugby league's oldest knockout competition, the Challenge Cup. All four rounds, including the final, were played as two-legged ties. The tournament took place over consecutive weeks in March and April 1943. All the ties were drawn at the beginning of March 1943 to enable the clubs to make travel arrangements in advance.

== First round ==
Date	Team	Score	Team	Source
13 March	Batley	3–7	Keighley	
13 March	Featherstone Rovers	11–12	Wakefield Trinity	
13 March	Halifax	2–0	Huddersfield	
13 March	Hull FC	0–21	Dewsbury	
13 March	Leeds	18–0	York	
13 March	St Helens	13–2	Barrow	
13 March	Wigan	6–5	Bradford Northern	
20 March	Barrow	4–0 (6)–(13)	St Helens	
20 March	Bradford Northern	18–3 (23)–(9)	Wigan	
20 March	Dewsbury	21–12 (42)–(12)	Hull FC	
20 March	Huddersfield	7–2 (7)–(4)	Halifax	
20 March	Keighley	15–0 (22)–(3)	Batley	
20 March	Wakefield Trinity	10–0 (22)–(11)	Featherstone Rovers	
20 March	York	7–14 (7)–(32)	Leeds	

Aggregate scores shown in brackets

== Second round ==
Date	Team	Score	Team	Source
27 March	Huddersfield	8–10	Dewsbury	
27 March	Keighley	2–0	Bradford Northern	
27 March	Oldham	17–12	St Helens	
27 March	Wakefield Trinity	5–8	Leeds	
3 April	Bradford Northern	6–7 (6)–(9)	Keighley	
3 April	Dewsbury	15–10 (25)–(18)	Huddersfield	
3 April	Leeds	10–8 (18)–(13)	Wakefield Trinity	
3 April	St Helens	5–20 (17)–(37)	Oldham	

Aggregate scores shown in brackets

== Semi-finals ==
Date	Team	Score	Team	Source
10 April	Keighley	5–3	Leeds	
10 April	Oldham	3–25	Dewsbury	
17 April	Dewsbury	43–5 (68)–(8)	Oldham	
17 April	Leeds	27–0 (30)–(5)	Keighley	

Aggregate scores shown in brackets

== Final ==
The final was played over the Easter weekend of 1943 with the first leg played on the Saturday and the second leg the following Monday. 10,740 attended the first leg at Crown Flatt while 16,000 watched the second leg at Headingley two days later. Receipts for the two games totalled £2,340.

Date	Team	Score	Team	Source
24 April	Dewsbury	16–9	Leeds	
26 April	Leeds	6–0	Dewsbury	

Dewsbury won 16–15 on aggregate.
