= Hudson Irving =

England international rugby league footballer

Personal information
- Born: 12 September 1912 Cockermouth district, England
- Died: 2 April 1947 (aged 34) Halifax, England

Playing information
- Position: Second-row
Club
Years	Team	Pld	T	G	FG	P
1933–47	Halifax	392	73	0	0	219
Representative
Years	Team	Pld	T	G	FG	P
	Yorkshire	1
	Cumberland	6
1938–43	England	4	0	0	0	0

Hudson Irving (12 September 1912 – 12 April 1947) was an English professional rugby league footballer who played in the 1930s and 1940s. He played at representative level for England, Cumberland and Yorkshire, and at club level for Halifax, as a second-row.

== Background ==
Hudson Irving was born in Cockermouth district, Cumberland.

== Playing career ==
Hudson Irving made his dêbut for Halifax on Saturday 2 September 1933. Hudson Irving played right-prop, in Halifax's 2-9 defeat by Leeds in the 1940–41 Challenge Cup Final at Odsal, Bradford, in front of a crowd of 28,500.

=== Representative honours ===
Irving won caps for England while at Halifax in 1938 against Wales, in 1940 against Wales, in 1941 against Wales, and in 1943 against Wales.

Irving won caps for Cumberland and Yorkshire while at Halifax.

=== Other notable matches ===
Hudson Irving played right-second-row for a Rugby League XIII against Northern Command XIII at Thrum Hall, Halifax on Saturday 21 March 1942.

== Death ==
On Saturday 12 April 1947 at a match between Halifax and Dewsbury, at Thrum Hall, Halifax, West Riding of Yorkshire, England, he suffered a heart attack, and he died aged 34. His funeral took place at Maryport cemetery.

== Honoured at Halifax ==
Hudson Irving is a Halifax Hall Of Fame Inductee.

== See also ==
List of rugby league players who died during matches
