= Harry Dyer =

England international rugby league footballer

Personal information
- Full name: Harry Dyer

Playing information
- Position: Second-row
Club
Years	Team	Pld	T	G	FG	P
1932–45	Leeds	267	9	0	0	27
Representative
Years	Team	Pld	T	G	FG	P
1938	Yorkshire	3	0	0	0	0
1939	England	1	0	0	0	0

Harry Dyer was an English professional rugby league footballer who played in the 1930s. He played at representative level for England, and at club level for Leeds, as a second-row.

== Playing career ==
=== Championship final appearances ===
Harry Dyer played at second-row in Leeds' 2–8 defeat by Hunslet in the Championship Final during the 1937–38 season at Elland Road, Leeds on Saturday 30 April 1938.

=== County Cup Final appearances ===
Harry Dyer played at second-row in Leeds' 14–8 victory over Huddersfield in the 1937–38 Yorkshire Cup Final during the 1937–38 season at Belle Vue, Wakefield on Saturday 30 October 1937.

=== International honours ===
Harry Dyer won a cap for England while at Leeds in 1939 against Wales.
