= Stan Brogden =

GB & England international rugby league footballer

Personal information
- Full name: Stanley Brogden
- Born: 15 March 1910 Holbeck, Leeds, England
- Died: 18 June 1981 (aged 71) Bradford, England

Playing information

Rugby league
- Position: Wing, Centre, Stand-off
Club
Years	Team	Pld	T	G	FG	P
1927–29	Bradford Northern	62
1929–34	Huddersfield	156	90	1		272
1934–38	Leeds	145	61	1	0	185
1938–41	Hull FC	84
	Rochdale Hornets (guest)
1944	St Helens R.F.C. (guest)	4	4	0	0	12
	Salford (guest)
≤1945	Bradford Northern (guest)
	Total	451	155	2	0	469
Representative
Years	Team	Pld	T	G	FG	P
1929–?	Yorkshire
1929–43	England	15	4	0	0	12
1929–37	Great Britain	16	3	0	0	9

Rugby union
Representative
Years	Team	Pld	T	G	FG	P
	British Empire Forces

Stanley Brogden (15 March 1910 – 18 June 1981) was an English sportsman from the 1920s.

Brogden was a rugby union and rugby league footballer, professional sprinter and baseball player active in the 1920s, 1930s and 1940s. He played representative level rugby league (RL) for Great Britain and England, and at club level for Bradford Northern (two spells, including one as a World War II guest), Huddersfield, Leeds, Hull FC, Rochdale Hornets, St Helens R.F.C. and Salford, as a wing, centre, or stand-off, and representative level rugby union (RU) for British Empire Forces,

== Background ==
Stan Brogden's birth was registered in Holbeck, Leeds, West Riding of Yorkshire, England, and he died aged 71 in Bradford, West Yorkshire, England.

== Playing career ==
=== Championship final appearances ===
Stan Brogden played at centre in Leeds' 2–8 defeat by Hunslet in the Championship Final during the 1937–38 season at Elland Road, Leeds on Saturday 30 April 1938.

=== Challenge Cup Final appearances ===
Stan Brogden played at centre in Huddersfield's 21–17 victory over Warrington in the 1933 Challenge Cup Final during the 1932–33 season at Wembley Stadium, London on Saturday 6 May 1933.

=== County Cup Final appearances ===
Stan Brogden played at centre in Leeds' 14–8 victory over Huddersfield in the 1937–38 Yorkshire Cup Final during the 1937–38 season at Belle Vue, Wakefield on Saturday 30 October 1937.

=== Club career ===
Between 1929 and 1934, Brogden made 156 appearances for Huddersfield, scoring 90 tries. Brogden made his début for Leeds against Wakefield Trinity at Belle Vue, Wakefield on Friday 30 March 1934.

=== Transfer records ===
In 1929, Huddersfield paid Bradford Northern a fee of £1000 for Stan Brogden (based on increases in average earnings, this would be approximately £158,200 in 2013). In 1934, Leeds paid Huddersfield a then world record fee of £1200 for Stan Brogden (based on increases in average earnings, this would be approximately £206,800 in 2013).

=== International honours ===
Stan Brogden won caps for England (RL) while at Bradford Northern in 1929 against Other Nationalities, while at Huddersfield in 1932 against Wales (2 matches), in 1933 against Other Nationalities, and Australia, while at Leeds in 1935 against France, and Wales, in 1936 against Wales (2 matches), and France, in 1938 against Wales, while at Hull in 1938 against Wales, in 1939 against France, in 1941 against Wales, in 1943 against Wales, and won caps for Great Britain (RL) while at Huddersfield in 1929–30 against Australia, in 1932 against Australia (3 matches), and New Zealand (3 matches), in 1933 against Australia (2 matches), while at Leeds in 1936 against Australia (3 matches), and New Zealand (2 matches), and in 1937 against Australia (2 matches).

In 1936, fellow tourist Arthur Atkinson counted Brogden's try in a tour match against New South Wales at Sydney as his most memorable moment in rugby to that date. He said

Thirty thousand spectators, 25 players, one referee and two touch-judges took that "dummy", so brilliantly was it made. Why, Woods, the wing-threequarter, actually dived over the line thinking that Brogden had passed the ball to him and that he had it safe for a try! But Brogden had kept the ball and he cut inside the last defender to put it down under the posts. Brogden in Australia was faster than any other player I had seen on a football field. He was so fast that sometimes I thought he would collapse.
