= 1941–42 Challenge Cup =

Rugby league competition

- Duration: 5 rounds
- Winners: Leeds
- Runners-up: Halifax

The 1941–42 Challenge Cup was the 41st staging of rugby league's oldest knockout competition, the Challenge Cup.

== First round ==
Date	Team one	Score one	Team two	Score two
11 Apr	Featherstone Rovers	11	St Helens	21
18 Apr	Wakefield Trinity	7	Batley	4
18 Apr	Batley	2	Wakefield Trinity	5
18 Apr	St Helens	8	Featherstone Rovers	3

== Second round ==
Date	Team one	Score one	Team two	Score two
25 Apr	Bradford Northern	18	Keighley	0
25 Apr	Halifax	14	Huddersfield	5
25 Apr	Hull FC	34	Bramley	0
25 Apr	Hunslet	16	St Helens	3
25 Apr	Oldham	14	Castleford	3
25 Apr	Swinton	29	York	5
25 Apr	Wakefield Trinity	3	Leeds	0
25 Apr	Wigan	6	Dewsbury	4
02 May	Bramley	8	Hull FC	17
02 May	Castleford	0	Oldham	10
02 May	Dewsbury	12	Wigan	14
02 May	Huddersfield	10	Halifax	10
02 May	Keighley	6	Bradford Northern	17
02 May	Leeds	8	Wakefield Trinity	0
02 May	St Helens	21	Hunslet	14
02 May	York	7	Swinton	15

== Quarterfinals ==
Date	Team one	Score one	Team two	Score two
09 May	Bradford Northern	11	Halifax	10
09 May	Leeds	22	Hull FC	8
09 May	Oldham	29	Hunslet	0
09 May	Swinton	0	Wigan	9
16 May	Halifax	21	Bradford Northern	16
16 May	Hull FC	12	Leeds	7
16 May	Hunslet	18	Oldham	17
16 May	Wigan	12	Swinton	17

== Semifinals ==
Date	Team one	Score one	Team two	Score two
23 May	Halifax	10	Wigan	0
23 May	Leeds	5	Oldham	2
30 May	Oldham	3	Leeds	12
30 May	Wigan	16	Halifax	16

== Final ==
Date	Team one	Score one	Team two	Score two
06 Jun	Leeds	15	Halifax	10
