= 1944–45 Yorkshire Cup =

- Structure: Regional knockout championship
- Teams: 17
- Winners: Hunslet
- Runners-up: Halifax

The 1944–45 Yorkshire Cup was the 37th occasion on which the Yorkshire Cup competition had been held.

The Second World War was continuing and the Yorkshire Cup remained in the early part of the 1944–45 Northern Rugby Football League Wartime Emergency League season calendar

Halifax won the trophy by beating Hunslet in a two-legged final by an aggregate score of 14–3.

Hunslet played the first leg match at home (at Parkside, Hunslet, Leeds, now in West Yorkshire) and lost 3–12. The attendance was 11,213 and receipts were £744. Halifax were at home (at Thrum Hall) for the second leg match and duly won 2–0. The attendance at the second leg match was 9,800 and receipts £745.

== Change in Club participation ==
Hull Kingston Rovers – The club dropped out of the wartime Lancashire league after the ‘first (1939–40) season. They did not return to league competition until 1945–46 peacetime season.
Bramley – withdrew after the third wartime season (1941–42) had finished and did not rejoin until the 1945–46 season.
Castleford – withdrew after the third wartime season (1941–42) had finished and did not participate for two seasons, re-joining for this 1944–45 season.
Hunslet – withdrew after the third wartime season (1941–42) had finished and did not participate for one season, and re-joined in time for the 1943–44 Northern Rugby Football League Wartime Emergency League season
Wigan - This club entered the Yorkshire Cup competition for the fifth successive season
Oldham - The club, as Wigan, also entered the Yorkshire Cup competition and for the fifth successive season
St. Helens - The club, as Wigan and Oldham, also entered the Yorkshire Cup competition and for their third successive season
Barrow – withdrew after the end of the first (1939–40) season finished and did not rejoin the league, including the Yorkshire Cup until the 1943–44 Northern Rugby Football League Wartime Emergency League season.
Dewsbury - had a relatively successful time during the war years. Managed by Eddie Waring, and with the side boosted by the inclusion of a number of big-name guest players, the club won the Wartime Emergency League in 1941–42 and again the following season 1942–43 (though that championship was declared null and void when it was discovered they had played an ineligible player). They were also runners-up in the Championship in 1943–44, Challenge Cup winners in 1943 and Yorkshire Cup final appearances in this season 1940–41 and winners in 1942–43.

== Background ==
This season there were no junior/amateur clubs taking part, Castleford rejoined after two seasons' absence, and with the Lancashire presence with the quartet of Wigan, Oldham, St. Helens and Barrow, this increased the entries by one, bringing the total up to seventeen.

This in turn resulted in no byes in the first round, and also the addition of one fixture in a preliminary round.

For the third successive year all the ties (this season including the actual final) were played on a two-legged home and away basis.

== Competition and results ==
=== Preliminary round – first leg ===
Involved 1 match and 2 clubs
The preliminary round tie was played on a two-legged home and away basis

| Game No | Fixture date | Home team | Score | Away team | Venue | agg | Att | Rec | Notes | Ref |
|---|---|---|---|---|---|---|---|---|---|---|
| | Sat 7 Oct 1944 | Wakefield Trinity | 3–12 | Halifax | Belle Vue | | | | | |

=== Preliminary round – second leg ===
Involved 1 match and 2 clubs
All first round ties are played on a two-legged home and away basis

| Game No | Fixture date | Home team | Score | Away team | Venue | agg | Att | Rec | Notes | Ref |
|---|---|---|---|---|---|---|---|---|---|---|
| | Sat 14 Oct 1944 | Halifax | 8–3 | Wakefield Trinity | Thrum Hall | 20–6 | | | | |

=== Round 1 – first leg ===
Involved 8 matches (with no byes) and 16 clubs
All first round ties are played on a two-legged home and away basis

| Game No | Fixture date | Home team | Score | Away team | Venue | agg | Att | Rec | Notes | Ref |
|---|---|---|---|---|---|---|---|---|---|---|
| 1 | Sat 21 Oct 1944 | Dewsbury | 6–4 | Keighley | Crown Flatt | | | | | |
| 2 | Sat 21 Oct 1944 | Featherstone Rovers | 6–0 | Leeds | Post Office Road | | | | | |
| 3 | Sat 21 Oct 1944 | Halifax | 14–2 | Batley | Thrum Hall | | | | | |
| 4 | Sat 21 Oct 1944 | Huddersfield | 23–19 | Hull | Fartown | | | | | |
| 5 | Sat 21 Oct 1944 | Hunslet | 6–3 | Castleford | Parkside | | | | | |
| 6 | Sat 21 Oct 1944 | Oldham | 5–18 | Wigan | Watersheddings | | | | | |
| 7 | Sat 21 Oct 1944 | St. Helens | 8–22 | Barrow | Knowsley Road | | | | | |
| 8 | Sat 21 Oct 1944 | York | 0–10 | Bradford Northern | Clarence Street | | | | | |

=== Round 1 – second leg ===
Involved 8 matches (with no byes) and 16 clubs
All first round ties are played on a two-legged home and away basis

| Game No | Fixture date | Home team | Score | Away team | Venue | agg | Att | Rec | Notes | Ref |
|---|---|---|---|---|---|---|---|---|---|---|
| 1 | Sat 28 Oct 1944 | Keighley | 5–5 | Dewsbury | Lawkholme Lane | 9–11 | | | | |
| 2 | Sat 28 Oct 1944 | Leeds | 5–3 | Featherstone Rovers | Headingley | 5–9 | | | | |
| 3 | Sat 28 Oct 1944 | Batley | 0–12 | Halifax | Mount Pleasant | 2–26 | | | | |
| 4 | Sat 28 Oct 1944 | Hull | 21–2 | Huddersfield | Boulevard | 40–25 | | | | |
| 5 | Sat 28 Oct 1944 | Castleford | 2–8 | Hunslet | Wheldon Road | 5–14 | | | | |
| 6 | Sat 28 Oct 1944 | Wigan | 39–2 | Oldham | Central Park | 57–7 | | | | |
| 7 | Sat 28 Oct 1944 | Barrow | 21–8 | St. Helens | Craven Park | 43–16 | | | | |
| 8 | Sat 28 Oct 1944 | Bradford Northern | 45–5 | York | Odsal | 55–5 | | | | |

=== Round 2 – quarterfinals – first leg ===
Involved 4 matches and 8 clubs
All second round ties are played on a two-legged home and away basis

| Game No | Fixture date | Home team | Score | Away team | Venue | agg | Att | Rec | Notes | Ref |
|---|---|---|---|---|---|---|---|---|---|---|
| 1 | Sat 04 Nov 1944 | Dewsbury | 0–0 | Hull | Crown Flatt | | | | | |
| 2 | Sat 04 Nov 1944 | Featherstone Rovers | 0–12 | Hunslet | Post Office Road | | | | | |
| 3 | Sat 04 Nov 1944 | Halifax | 10–0 | Bradford Northern | Thrum Hall | | | | | |
| 4 | Sat 04 Nov 1944 | Wigan | 9–5 | Barrow | Central Park | | | | | |

=== Round 2 – second leg ===
Involved 4 matches and 8 clubs
All second round ties are played on a two-legged home and away basis

| Game No | Fixture date | Home team | Score | Away team | Venue | agg | Att | Rec | Notes | Ref |
|---|---|---|---|---|---|---|---|---|---|---|
| 1 | Sat 11 Nov 1944 | Hull | 5–7 | Dewsbury | Boulevard | 5–7 | | | | |
| 2 | Sat 11 Nov 1944 | Hunslet | 15–0 | Featherstone Rovers | Parkside | 27–0 | | | | |
| 3 | Sat 11 Nov 1944 | Bradford Northern | 5–5 | Halifax | Odsal | 5–15 | | | | |
| 4 | Sat 11 Nov 1944 | Barrow | 5–2 | Wigan | Craven Park | 10–11 | | | | |

=== Round 3 – semifinals – first leg ===
Involved 2 matches and 4 clubs
Both semi-final ties are played on a two-legged home and away basis

| Game No | Fixture date | Home team | Score | Away team | Venue | agg | Att | Rec | Notes | Ref |
|---|---|---|---|---|---|---|---|---|---|---|
| 1 | Sat 18 Nov 1944 | Hunslet | 9–0 | Dewsbury | Parkside | | | | | |
| 2 | Sat 18 Nov 1944 | Wigan | 5–6 | Halifax | Central Park | | | | | |

=== Semifinal – second leg ===
Involved 2 matches and 4 clubs
Both semi-final ties are played on a two-legged home and away basis

| Game No | Fixture date | Home team | Score | Away team | Venue | agg | Att | Rec | Notes | Ref |
|---|---|---|---|---|---|---|---|---|---|---|
| 1 | Sat 25 Nov 1944 | Dewsbury | 0–2 | Hunslet | Crown Flatt | 0–11 | | | | |
| 2 | Sat 25 Nov 1944 | Halifax | 9–7 | Wigan | Thrum Hall | 15–12 | | | | |

=== Final ===
==== First leg ====
The final was played on a two-legged home and away basis this season. Receipts for the first leg were £744.

2 December 1944

| Hunslet | 3 – 12 | Halifax |
|---|---|---|
| Tries: Stansfield | | Tries: Meek, Dixon; Goals: Lockwood (2), Rule |

Parkside
Attendance: 11,213
Referee: S. Adams (Hull)

| Hunslet | No. | Halifax |
|---|---|---|
| | Teams | |
| Longley | 1 | Hubert Lockwood |
| Arthur Thurling | 2 | Jim Bevan |
| Ernest Winter | 3 | Friend Taylor |
| Frank Watson | 4 | George Todd |
| Freddie Williamson | 5 | Alan Prescott |
| Burnell | 6 | Fred Rule |
| Fletcher | 7 | Tommy McCue (Note: Guest players from Widnes) |
| Cyril Plenderleith | 8 | Morgan |
| Joe Britton | 9 | Jones |
| Doug Billings | 10 | Hudson Irving |
| Des Clarkson | 11 | Mel Meek |
| Colin Stansfield | 12 | Hughie McDowell |
| Ken Traill | 13 | Jack Dixon |
| | Coach | |

==== Second leg ====
Halifax won the Yorkshire Cup with an aggregate score of 14–3. Receipts for the second leg were £745.

9 December 1944

| Halifax | 2 – 0 | Hunslet |
|---|---|---|
| Goals: Lockwood |

Thrum Hall
Attendance: 9,800
Referee: J. E. Taylor (Wakefield)

| Halifax | No. | Hunslet |
|---|---|---|
| | Teams | |
| Hubert Lockwood | 1 | Jack Walkington |
| Jim Bevan | 2 | Arthur Thurling |
| Friend Taylor | 3 | Ernest Winter |
| George Todd | 4 | Frank Watson |
| Alan Prescott | 5 | Freddie Williamson |
| Fred Rule | 6 | Burnell |
| Tommy McCue | 7 | Fletcher |
| Hughie McDowell | 8 | Cyril Plenderleith |
| Jones | 9 | Joe Britton |
| Hudson Irving | 10 | Doug Billings |
| Mel Meek | 11 | Colin Stansfield |
| Harry Millington | 12 | Des Clarkson |
| Jack Dixon | 13 | Ken Traill |
| | Coach | |

== See also ==
- 1944–45 Northern Rugby Football League Wartime Emergency League season
- Rugby league county cups

== Sources ==
- Saxton, Irvin (ed.). History of Rugby League: No.50: 1944–45. Rugby Leaguer.
- Yorkshire Cup 1944/45 at Rugby League Project
