= Leonard Smith =

Leonard or Len Smith may refer to:

== Sports ==
- Len Smith (rugby league) (1911–2000), rugby league footballer of the 1930s for England, and Hunslet
- Leonard Smith (American football) (born 1960), American footballer for Buffalo Bills and St. Louis/Phoenix Cardinals
- Len Smith (footballer, born 1882) (1882–1943), Australian rules footballer for South Melbourne and cricketer
- Len Smith (footballer, born 1912) (1912–1967), Australian rules footballer and coach
- Len Smith (footballer, born 1913) (1913–1972), Australian rules footballer for North Melbourne
- Len Smith (rugby) (1918–2000), rugby union and rugby league footballer of the 1930-40s for Australia, New South Wales, Eastern Suburbs and Newtown
- Len Smith (swimmer) (1906–1998), New Zealand swimmer
- Len Smith (American football) (1896–1944), American football player

== Others ==
- Leonard A. Smith (1915–2002), American politician
- Leonard B. Smith (1915–2006), American pilot
- Leonard B. Smith (musician), American cornet soloist, conductor and composer
- Leonard N. Smith (born 1961), pastor
- Leonard Smith (cinematographer) (1892–1947), American cinematographer
- Leonard P. Smith (1814–1886), mayor of Seattle
- Len Smith (trade unionist) (1879–1964), British trade unionist
- Leonard V. Smith, American military historian
