= 1933–34 Challenge Cup =

Rugby league competition

- Duration: 5 rounds
- Winners: Hunslet
- Runners-up: Widnes

The 1933–34 Challenge Cup was the 34th staging of rugby league's oldest knockout competition, the Challenge Cup during the 1933–34 season.

== First round ==
Date	Team one	Score one	Team two	Score two
10 Feb	Batley	11	Halifax	12
10 Feb	Bradford Northern	6	St Helens	34
10 Feb	Bramley	20	Dearham	11
10 Feb	Broughton Rangers	3	Castleford	9
10 Feb	Featherstone Rovers	4	Huddersfield	19
10 Feb	Hull FC	6	Rochdale Hornets	5
10 Feb	Hull Kingston Rovers	18	Wigan Rangers	2
10 Feb	Hull St Mary's	2	London	32
10 Feb	Keighley	4	Warrington	4
10 Feb	Leigh	6	Hunslet	8
10 Feb	Oldham	19	Dewsbury	2
10 Feb	Pendlebury Jnrs	3	St Helens Recs	32
10 Feb	Salford	15	Barrow	2
10 Feb	Wakefield Trinity	7	Wigan	14
10 Feb	Widnes	12	Leeds	3
10 Feb	York	0	Swinton	0
14 Feb	Swinton	5	York	15
14 Feb	Warrington	15	Keighley	9

== Second round ==
Date	Team one	Score one	Team two	Score two
24 Feb	Bramley	17	St Helens	12
24 Feb	Castleford	4	Hunslet	4
24 Feb	Huddersfield	11	Hull FC	7
24 Feb	Hull Kingston Rovers	0	Widnes	10
24 Feb	London	19	Warrington	5
24 Feb	St Helens Recs	7	Oldham	7
24 Feb	Salford	5	Halifax	9
24 Feb	Wigan	7	York	13
28 Feb	Hunslet	23	Castleford	0
28 Feb	Oldham	18	St Helens Recs	5

== Quarterfinals ==
Date	Team one	Score one	Team two	Score two
10 Mar	Huddersfield	21	London	2
10 Mar	Hunslet	2	York	0
10 Mar	Oldham	8	Bramley	6
15 Mar	Halifax	3	Widnes	5

== Semifinals ==
Date	Team one	Score one	Team two	Score two
24 Mar	Widnes	7	Oldham	4
24 Mar	Hunslet	12	Huddersfield	7

== Final ==
Hunslet defeated Widnes 11-5 in the final at Wembley before a crowd of 41,280.

This was Hunslet’s second Cup final win, the first being in 1907–08, in their third Cup final appearance.

5 May 1934

Hunslet	11 - 5	Widnes
Tries: Morrell, Beverley, Smith; Goals: Tolson	Report	Tries: McDowell; Goals Ratcliffe

Wembley, London
Attendance: 41,280 (HT 5-3)
Referee: A Holbrook (Warrington)

1	Jack Walkington (c)
2	George Dennis
3	Cyril Morrell
4	Ernest Winter
5	George Broughton
6	George Todd
7	William S. Thornton
8	Len Smith
9	Leslie White
10	Mark Tolson
11	Hector Crowther
12	Harry Beverley
13	Frank 'Dolly' Dawson

1	Walter Bradley
2	Harry Owen
3	Peter Topping
4	Percy Jacks
5	Alf Gallimore
6	Thomas Shannon
7	Tommy McCue
8	Nat Silcock (c)
9	Jimmy Jones
10	Alec Higgins
11	Hugh McDowell
12	Harry Millington
13	Albert Ratcliffe
