= Raymond Poincaré =

President of France from 1913 to 1920

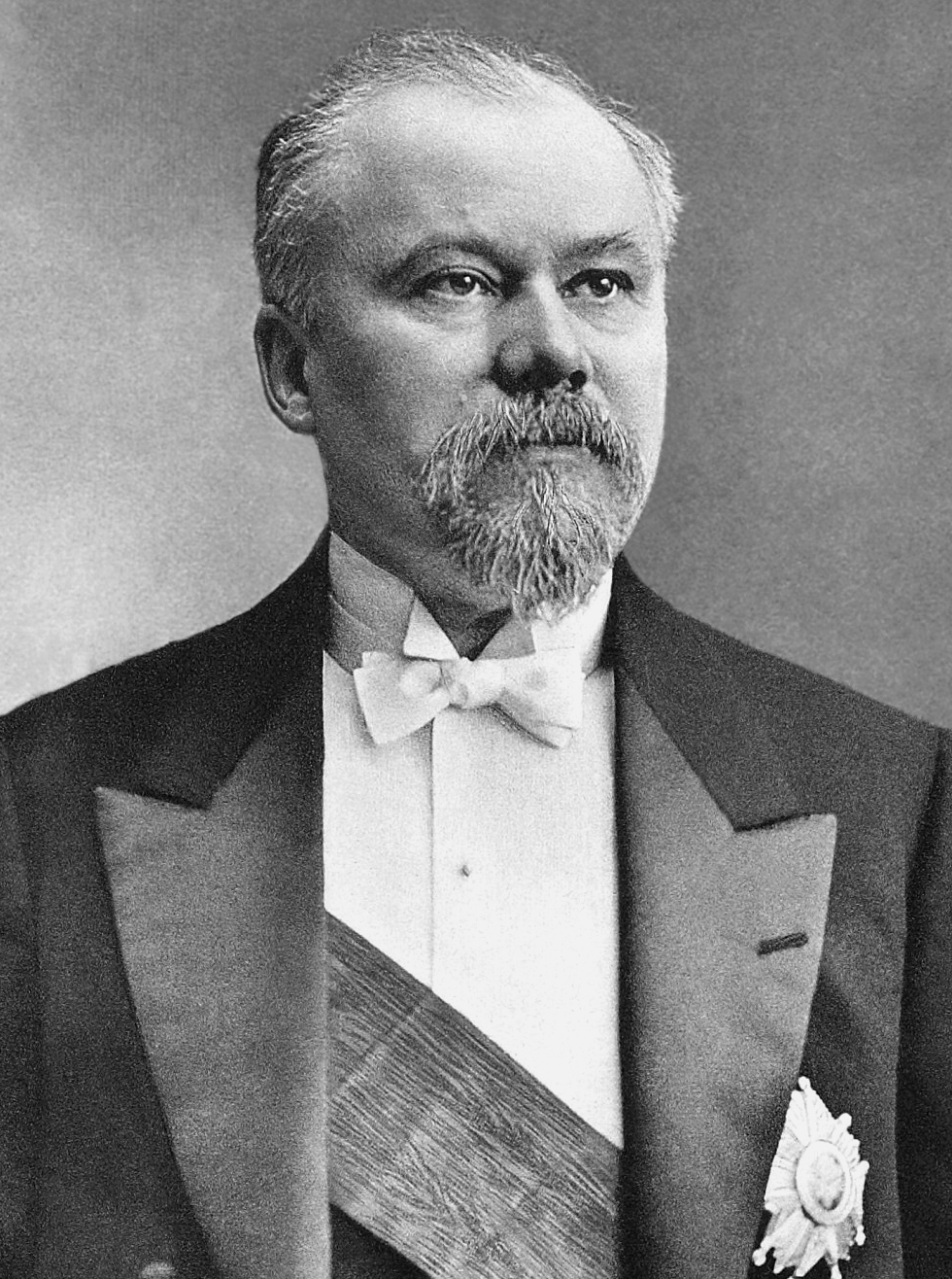
- Official portrait, 1913

President of France
- In office 18 February 1913 – 18 February 1920
- Prime Minister: See list: Aristide Briand; Louis Barthou; Gaston Doumergue; Alexandre Ribot; René Viviani; Paul Painlevé; Georges Clemenceau; Alexandre Millerand
- Preceded by: Armand Fallières
- Succeeded by: Paul Deschanel

Prime Minister of France
- In office 23 July 1926 – 29 July 1929
- President: Gaston Doumergue
- Preceded by: Édouard Herriot
- Succeeded by: Aristide Briand
- In office 15 January 1922 – 8 June 1924
- President: Alexandre Millerand
- Preceded by: Aristide Briand
- Succeeded by: Frédéric François-Marsal
- In office 21 January 1912 – 21 January 1913
- President: Armand Fallières
- Preceded by: Joseph Caillaux
- Succeeded by: Aristide Briand

Minister of Foreign Affairs
- In office 15 January 1922 – 8 June 1924
- Prime Minister: Himself
- Preceded by: Aristide Briand
- Succeeded by: Edmond Lefebvre du Prey
- In office 14 January 1912 – 21 January 1913
- Prime Minister: Himself
- Preceded by: Justin de Selves
- Succeeded by: Charles Jonnart

Minister of Finance
- In office 23 July 1926 – 11 November 1928
- Prime Minister: Himself
- Preceded by: Anatole de Monzie
- Succeeded by: Henry Chéron
- In office 14 March 1906 – 25 October 1906
- Prime Minister: Ferdinand Sarrien
- Preceded by: Pierre Merlou
- Succeeded by: Joseph Caillaux
- In office 30 May 1894 – 26 January 1895
- Prime Minister: Charles Dupuy
- Preceded by: Auguste Burdeau
- Succeeded by: Alexandre Ribot

Minister of Education
- In office 26 January 1895 – 1 November 1895
- Prime Minister: Alexandre Ribot
- Preceded by: Georges Leygues
- Succeeded by: Émile Combes
- In office 4 April 1893 – 3 December 1893
- Prime Minister: Charles Dupuy
- Preceded by: Charles Dupuy
- Succeeded by: Eugène Spuller

Personal details
- Born: Raymond Nicolas Landry Poincaré; 20 August 1860 Bar-le-Duc, Second French Empire
- Died: 15 October 1934 (aged 74) Paris, French Third Republic
- Party: Democratic Republican Alliance
- Spouse: Henriette Benucci (m. 1904)
- Education: University of Nantes; University of Paris

Raymond Nicolas Landry Poincaré (French: [ʁɛmɔ̃ pwɛ̃kaʁe]; 20 August 1860 – 15 October 1934) was a French statesman who served as President of France from 1913 to 1920, and three times as Prime Minister of France. He was a conservative leader, primarily committed to political and social stability.

Trained in law, Poincaré was elected as a Deputy in 1887 and served in the cabinets of Dupuy and Ribot. In 1902, he co-founded the Democratic Republican Alliance, the most important centre-right party under the Third Republic, becoming prime minister in 1912 and serving as President of the Republic for 1913–1920. Attempting to exercise influence from a traditionally figurehead role, he visited Russia in 1912 and 1914 to repair relations with Russia which had been strained by the Bosnian Crisis of 1908 and the Agadir Crisis of 1911. He likewise played an important role during the July Crisis of 1914 which ultimately led to France's participation in World War I. From 1917 onward, he exercised less influence after his political rival Georges Clemenceau had become prime minister. At the Paris Peace Conference, he favoured Allied occupation of the Rhineland.

In 1922 Poincaré returned to power as prime minister. In 1923 he ordered the Occupation of the Ruhr to enforce payment of German reparations. By this time Poincaré was seen, especially in the English-speaking world, as an aggressive figure (Poincaré-la-Guerre) who had helped to cause the war in 1914 and who now favoured punitive anti-German policies. His government was defeated by the Cartel des Gauches at the elections of 1924. He served a third term as prime minister in 1926–1929.

Poincaré was an International Member of both the American Philosophical Society and the American Academy of Arts and Sciences. Nicknamed Le Lion ("the Lion"), Poincaré is honored as a victorious wartime leader in France.

== Early years ==
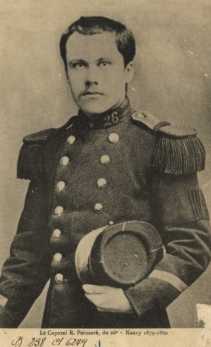
Poincaré during his military service in the 1880s

Born in Bar-le-Duc, Meuse, France, Raymond Poincaré was the son of Nanine Marie Ficatier, who was deeply religious and Nicolas Antonin Hélène Poincaré, a distinguished civil servant and meteorologist. Raymond was also the cousin of Henri Poincaré, the famous mathematician. Educated at the University of Paris, Raymond was called to the Paris Bar, and was for some time law editor of the Voltaire. He became at the age of 20 the youngest lawyer in France and was appointed Secrétaire de la Conférence du Barreau de Paris. As a lawyer, he successfully defended Jules Verne in a libel suit presented against the famous author by the chemist, Eugène Turpin, inventor of the explosive melinite, who claimed that the "mad scientist" character in Verne's book Facing the Flag was based on him. At the age of 26, Poincaré was elected to the Chamber of Deputies, making him the youngest deputy in the chamber.

== Early political career ==
Poincaré had served for over a year in the Department of Agriculture when in 1887 he was elected deputy for the Meuse département. He made a great reputation in the Chamber as an economist, and sat on the budget commissions of 1890–1891 and 1892. He was minister of education, fine arts and religion in the first cabinet (April – November 1893) of Charles Dupuy, and minister of finance in the second and third (May 1894 – January 1895). In Alexandre Ribot's cabinet, Poincaré became minister of public instruction. Although he was excluded from the Radical cabinet which followed, the revised scheme of death duties proposed by the new ministry was based upon his proposals of the previous year. He became vice-president of the chamber in the autumn of 1895 and, in spite of the bitter hostility of the Radicals, retained his position in 1896 and 1897.

Along with other followers of "Opportunist" Léon Gambetta, Poincaré founded the Democratic Republican Alliance (ARD) in 1902, which became the most important centre-right party under the Third Republic. In 1906, he returned to the ministry of finance in the short-lived Sarrien ministry. Poincaré had retained his practice at the Bar during his political career, and he published several volumes of essays on literary and political subjects.

"Poincarism" was a political movement over the period 1902–1920. In 1902, the term was used by Georges Clemenceau to define a young generation of conservative politicians who had lost the idealism of the founders of the republic. After 1911, the term was used to mean "national renewal" when faced with the German threat. After the First World War, "Poincarism" refers to his support of business and financial interests. Poincaré was noted for his lifelong feud with Georges Clemenceau. Clemenceau and Poincaré absolutely detested one another and engaged in one of the longest running feuds in French politics. The British historian Anthony Adamthwaite described Poincaré as having an "obsession with Clemenceau verging on paranoia" and as a "cold fish whose one passion was cats".

== First premiership ==
Poincaré became Prime Minister in January 1912, and began a policy meant to block Germany's ambitions for "world power status", and worked to restore ties with France's ally, Russia. During the Bosnian Crisis of 1908-1909, the Franco-Russian alliance had been badly strained when France refused to support Russia after Austria-Hungary, supported by Germany, threatened war. During the Second Moroccan Crisis in 1911, Russia refused to support France when Germany threatened war. The lack of French interest in supporting Russia during the Bosnia crisis was the nadir of Franco-Russian relations with Tsar Nicholas II making no effort to hide his displeasure at the lack of support from what was supposed to be his number one ally. At the time, Nicholas seriously considered abrogating the alliance, and was only stopped by the lack of an alternative. Russia's refusal to support France during the Second Moroccan Crisis in 1911 reflected the enduring bitterness caused in St. Petersburg by France's refusal to support Russia during the Bosnia crisis which ended with humiliation. Poincaré believed a rift in the Franco-Russian alliance could only benefit Germany. Germany would be encouraged to think that it was possible to threaten war with France as the Russians might not honour the alliance. In August 1912, Poincaré visited Russia to meet Tsar Nicholas in order to strengthen diplomatic ties. Poincaré believed the rapprochement would deter Germany from risking a demarche to war, and thus avoid a repeat of the Second Moroccan crisis. Tsarist Russia, despite its Francophilia, was generally disdainful of most of the leaders of the Third Republic, but Poincaré was an exception, regarded in St. Petersburg as a strong leader who meant what he said. The Russian Foreign Minister, Sergey Sazonov, in a report to Nicholas wrote that, after meeting Poincaré: "Russia possesses a sure and faithful friend, endowed with a political spirit above the line and an inflexible will.".

At the same time, Poincaré hoped to pursue an expansionist policy at the expense of Germany's unofficial ally, the Ottoman Empire. For historical, economic and religious reasons, the French had traditionally been very interested in the Levant region of the Middle East. France had for centuries been the protector of the Maronite Christians, most recently in 1860, when France had threatened war following the massacres of the Maronites by local Muslims and Druze, while the Ottoman authorities did nothing. In the early years of the 20th century, there was an influential Levantine lobby within France to argue that it was France's mission to take over Ottoman Syria (roughly what is now modern Syria, Lebanon, Israel, Jordan, the West Bank and the Gaza Strip). Poincaré was a leading member of the Comité de l'Orient, the main group that advocated French expansionism in the Middle East. Poincaré's willingness to begin a rapprochement with Imperial Germany in order to allow France to pursue its ambitions in the Middle East was strengthened by the outcome of the First Balkan War, where Bulgaria - whose army had been trained by a French military mission - rapidly defeated the Sultan's army - whose forces had been trained by the German military. Bulgaria's swift victory over the Ottomans was a great blow to German prestige, and correspondingly boosted French confidence, something that allowed Poincaré to approach Berlin from a position of strength.

Poincaré believed that the best policy was one of "firmness" where France would assert its interests forcefully while not excluding the possibility of better foreign relations. After defeat in the Franco-Prussian War of 1870–71, French elites concluded that France could never hope to defeat Germany on its own, and the only way to defeat Germany would be with the help of another great power. Besides its military superiority, Germany had demographic superiority with 70 million people compared with France's 40 million people (not including the colonies) together with economic superiority as the German economy was three times larger than France's. Poincaré therefore rejected Caillaux's proposal for a Franco-German alliance, arguing that Paris would be the junior partner, thus tantamount to ending France's status as a great power. By contrast, the Treaty powers known as the Triple Entente being between two more or less equal powers, would preserve the current status quo ante bellum. Poincaré's foreign policy was essentially defensive as he wished to maintain France as a great power in face of Germany's demands for Weltpolitik ("World politics") under which Germany sought to become the world's dominant power. Poincaré's entire foreign policy was based on the old Roman saying si vis pacem, para bellum ("if you want peace, prepare for war"). He wanted to strengthen both France and Russia to such a point that they presented such a decisive margin of superiority as to deter Germany from going to war with either power, but at same time his foreign policy was not relentlessly anti-German. Although he rejected Caillaux's ideas, he was prepared to improve Franco-German relations on specific issues. A fiscal conservative, Poincaré was deeply concerned about the financial effects of an ever more costly arms race. Being from Lorraine, whether he was a revanchard (revanchist) is disputed. His family house was requisitioned for three years during the war. His speeches warned of the "German menace" and believed Caillaux's policy of rapprochement with Berlin would create an impression of French weakness in Wilhelm II's mind, being a man who only respected the strong. The Canadian historians, Holger Herwig and Richard Hamilton, described Poincaré as: "Typically for a man on the right side of the republican center, Poincaré was anti-clerical, but not anti-religious, nationalist, but not bellicose, a defender of property rights, free markets and small government. No ideologue, he was a practical politician willing to work with any true Frenchmen but adamant in defending France from the Socialist Left, the Catholic Right and, of course, Germany".

== Presidency ==
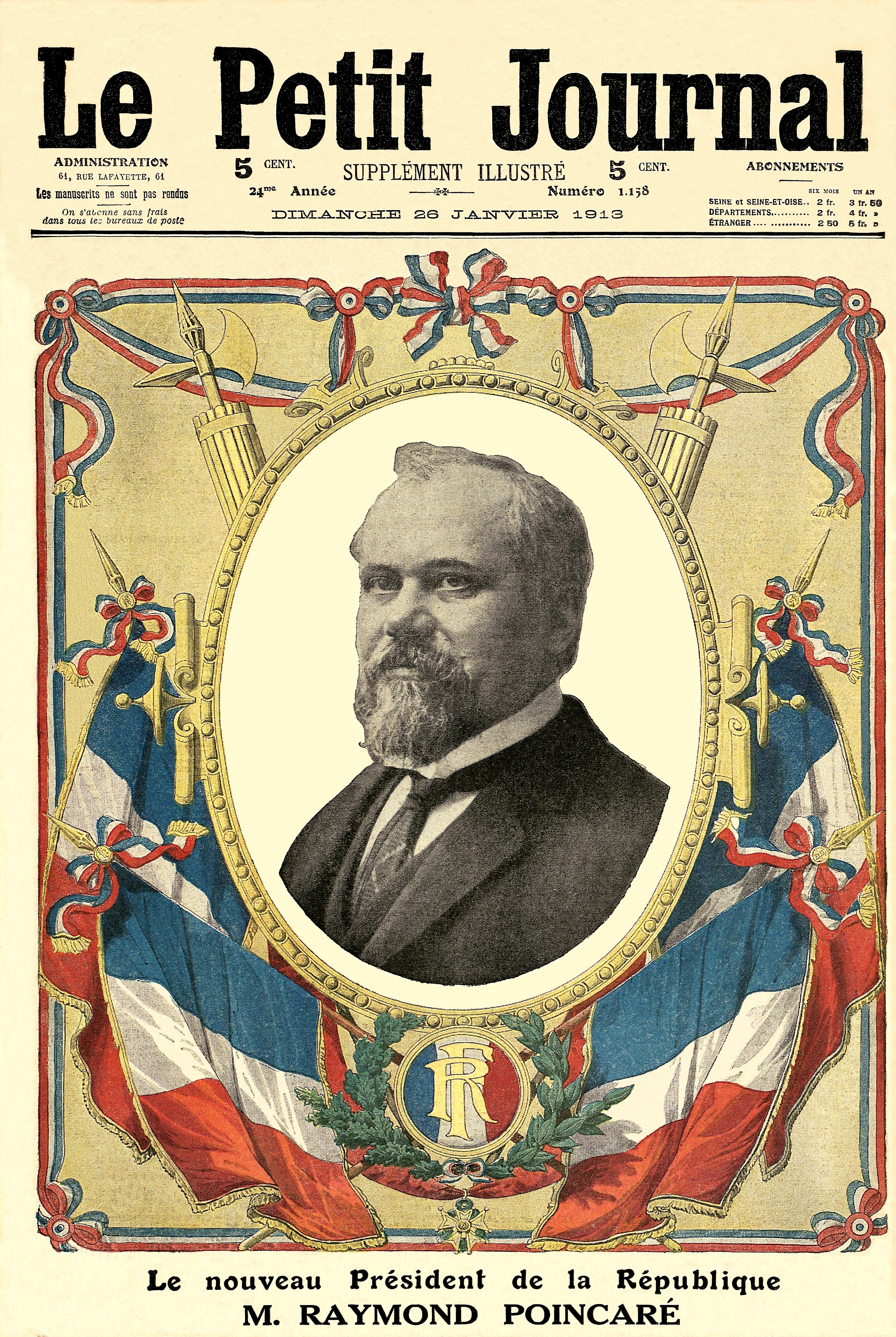
Le Petit Journal announces the election of Poincaré (1913).

=== Pre-war ===
Poincaré won election as President of the Republic in 1913, in succession to Armand Fallières. The strong-willed Poincaré was the first president of the Third Republic since MacMahon in the 1870s to attempt to make that office into a site of power rather than an empty ceremonial role. He asserted his personality and took a special interest in foreign policy. On 20 January 1914, he became the first French president to visit the German embassy in Paris, a gesture clearly meant to show that he wanted to continue a policy of trying to improve German understanding of French aims.

In early 1914, Poincaré found himself caught up in scandal when the leftist politician Joseph Caillaux threatened to publish letters showing that Poincaré was engaged in secret talks with the Vatican using the Italian government as an intermediary, which would have outraged anti-clerical opinion in France. Caillaux refrained from publishing the documents after the President pressured Gaston Calmette, editor of Le Figaro, not to publish documents showing that Caillaux had been unfaithful to his first wife, was involved in questionable financial dealings implicating a pro-German foreign policy. The matter might have remained settled had not the second Madame Caillaux, upset that Calmette might publish love letters written to her while her husband was still married to her predecessor, gone to Calmette's office on 16 March 1914 and shot him dead. The resulting scandal known as the Caillaux affair was the major French news story of the first half of 1914 causing Poincaré to joke that from now on he might send out Madame Poincaré to murder his political enemies since this method was working so well for Caillaux.

=== July Crisis ===
On 28 June 1914, Poincaré was at the Longchamp Racecourse when he received news of the assassination of the Archduke Franz Ferdinand in Sarajevo, at 17:30 from his assistants. The President remarked that the assassination was a tragedy, ordered an aide to draft a message of condolence to the people of Austria-Hungary, and stayed on to enjoy the rest of the races. The American historian David Fromkin has noted that the term "July Crisis" is actually a misnomer as it suggests that Europe was plunged into a crisis with the assassination of Franz Ferdinand on 28 June, but in fact the July crisis only began with the Austro-Hungarian ultimatum to Serbia, containing terms patently intended to inspire rejection, on 23 July 1914. The crisis was caused not by the assassination but rather by the decision in Vienna to use it as a pretext for a war with Serbia that many in the Austro-Hungarian government had long advocated.

In 1913, it had been announced that Poincaré would visit St. Petersburg in July 1914 to meet Tsar Nicholas II. The Austro-Hungarian Foreign Minister, Count Leopold von Berchtold, decided it was too dangerous for Austria-Hungary to present the ultimatum while the Franco-Russian summit was in progress and decided to wait until Poincaré was on board the battleship France that would take him home. Accompanied by Premier René Viviani, Poincaré went to Russia for the second time (but for the first time as president) to reinforce the Franco-Russian Alliance. The transcripts of the St. Petersburg summit have been lost, but the surviving documentary evidence suggests that neither Nicholas nor Poincaré were particularly concerned about the situation in the Balkans. At the time of the St. Petersburg summit, there were rumours, but little hard evidence, that Vienna might use the assassination to start a war with Serbia. When the Austro-Hungarian ultimatum was presented to Serbia on 23 July, the French government was in the hands of Jean-Baptiste Bienvenu-Martin, Minister of Justice and acting Premier. Bienvenu-Martin's inability to make decisions was especially exasperating to Philippe Berthelot, the most senior man in the Quai d'Orsay present in Paris, who complained that France was doing nothing while Europe was threatened with the prospect of war. Furthermore, Poincaré's attempts to communicate with Paris were blocked by the Germans who jammed the radio messages between his ship and Paris.

It was not until Poincaré had arrived back in Paris on 30 July 1914 that he finally learned of the crisis, and immediately attempted to stop matters from escalating into war. With Poincaré's full approval, Viviani sent a telegram to Nicholas affirming that:

in the precautionary measures and defensive measures to which Russia believes herself obliged to resort, she should not immediately proceed to any measure which might offer Germany a pretext for a total or partial mobilization of her forces.

Additionally, orders were given for French forces to pull back six miles from the frontier with Germany.

The next day, 31 July, the German ambassador in Paris, Count Wilhelm von Schoen, presented to Viviani an ultimatum warning that, if Russian mobilisation continued, Germany would attack both France and Russia within the next 12 hours. The ultimatum also demanded that France abrogate at once the alliance with Russia, allow German troops to march into France unopposed and turn over the fortresses in Verdun and Toul to the Germans to be occupied as long as Germany was at war with Russia. In response, the French government ordered its ambassador in St. Petersburg, Maurice Paléologue, to find what was going on in Russia while refusing a request from General Joseph Joffre to order French mobilisation.

However, the German ultimatum of 31 July 1914 left the French with two options: either to accept the humiliation of accepting the ultimatum, which would be the effective end of France as an independent nation, or go to war with Germany. The American historian Leonard V. Smith, together with the French historians Annette Becker and Stéphane Audoin-Rouzeau, wrote that France had no option but to go to war as the prospect of accepting Schoen's ultimatum was too humiliating for the vast majority of the French people. After Germany declared war on France following the rejection of the ultimatum, Poincaré appeared before the National Assembly to announce that France was now at war forming the doctrine of the union sacrée in which he announced that: "nothing will break the union sacrée in the face of the enemy." (Note: Quotation: "In the coming war, France will be heroically defended by all her sons, whose sacred union will not be broken in the face of the enemy". French: Dans la guerre qui s'engage, la France […] sera héroïquement défendue par tous ses fils, dont rien ne brisera devant l'ennemi l'union sacrée)

=== Later war ===
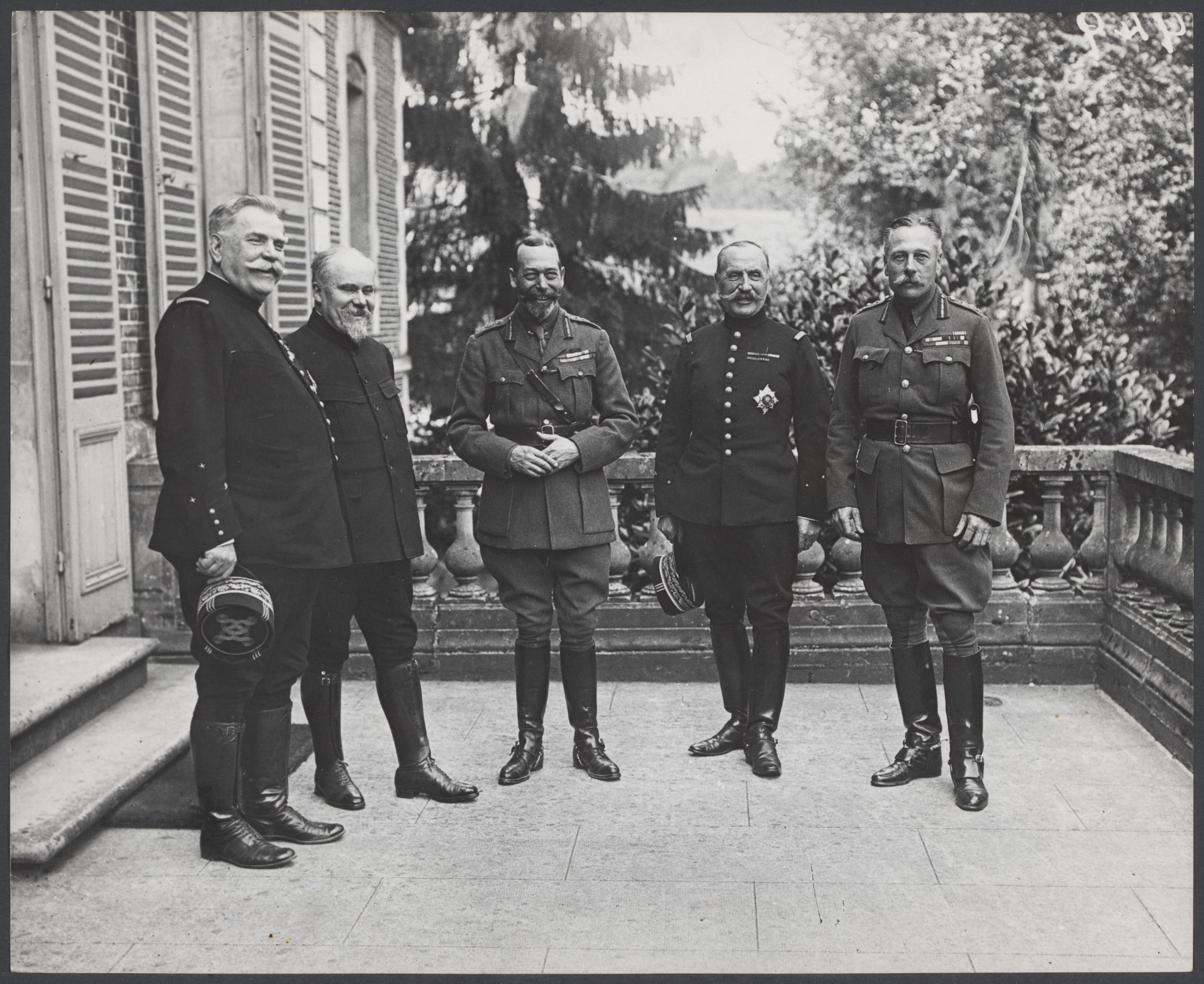
British and French leaders at Beauquesne, France, August 1916. From left to right: Joseph Joffre, Raymond Poincaré, King George V, General Ferdinand Foch; General Sir Douglas Haig.

Poincaré became increasingly sidelined after the accession to power of Georges Clemenceau as prime minister in 1917. He believed the Armistice happened too soon and that the French Army should have penetrated far deeper into Germany. At the Paris Peace Conference of 1919, negotiating the Treaty of Versailles, he wanted France to wrest the Rhineland from Germany to put it under Allied military control.

Ferdinand Foch urged Poincaré to invoke his powers as laid down in the constitution and take over the negotiations of the treaty due to worries that Clemenceau was not achieving France's aims. He did not, and when the French Cabinet approved of the terms which Clemenceau obtained, Poincaré considered resigning, although again he refrained.

== Second premiership ==
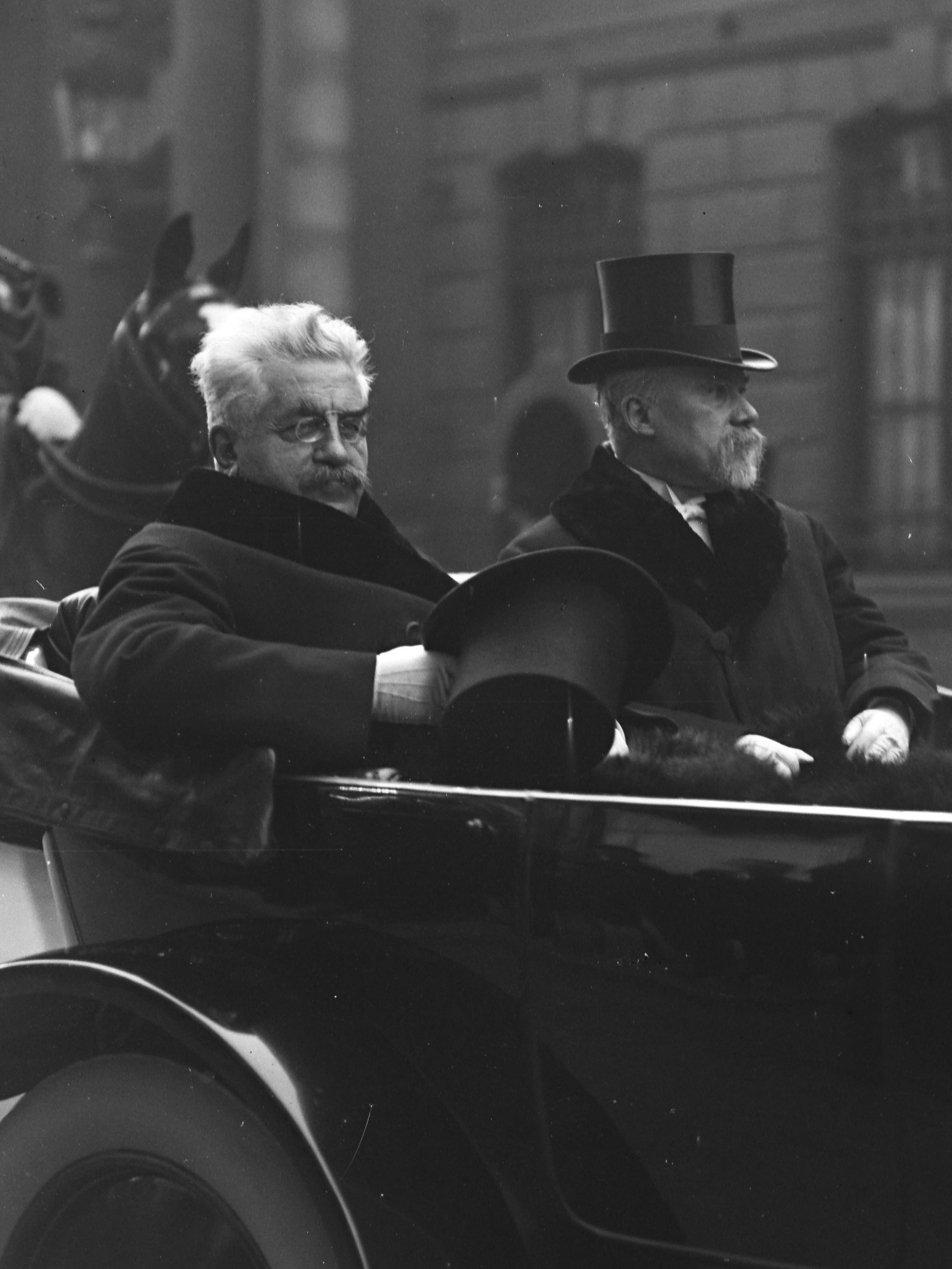
Poincaré with President Alexandre Millerand in 1923.

In 1920, Poincaré's term as president came to an end, and two years later he returned to office as prime minister. Once again, his tenure was noted for its strong anti-German policies.

Frustrated at Germany's unwillingness to pay reparations, Poincaré hoped for joint Anglo-French economic sanctions against it in 1922, while opposing military action. In April 1922, Poincaré was greatly alarmed by the Treaty of Rapallo, the beginning of a German-Soviet challenge to the international order established by the Treaty of Versailles. He was disturbed that British Prime Minister David Lloyd George did not share the French viewpoint, instead almost welcoming Rapallo as a chance to bring Soviet Russia into the international system. Poincaré came to believe by May 1922 that if Rapallo could not convince the British that Germany was out to undercut the Versailles system by whatever means necessary, then nothing would, in which case France would just have to act alone. Further adding to Poincaré's fears was the worldwide propaganda campaign started in April 1922 blaming France for World War I as a means of disproving Article 231 of the Treaty of Versailles, which would thereby undermine the French claim to reparations.

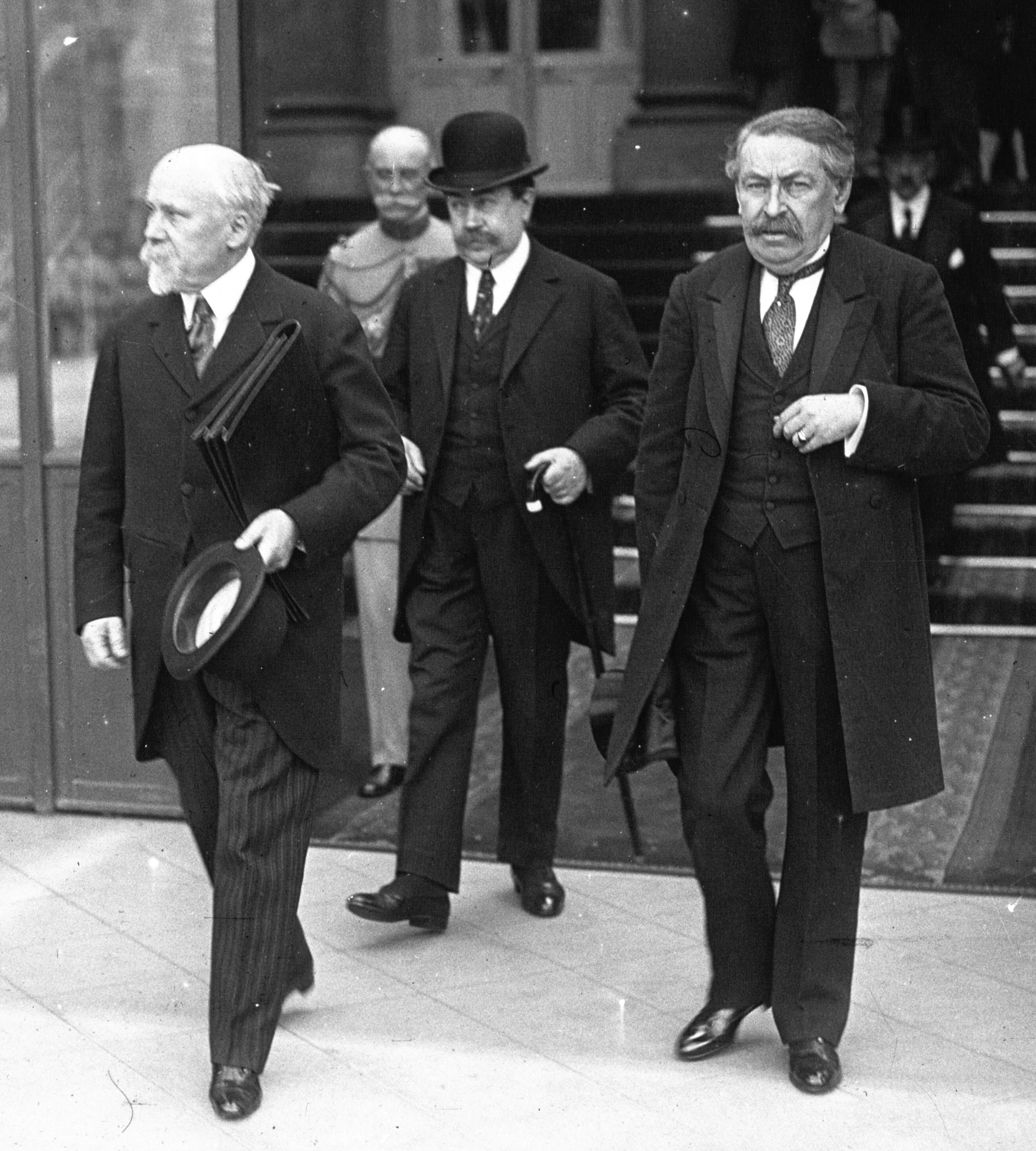
Poincaré with Painlevé and Briand (1925)

In the German-Soviet propaganda of the 1920s, the July Crisis of 1914 was portrayed as Poincaré-la-guerre (Poincaré's war), in which Poincaré put into action the plans he had allegedly negotiated with Emperor Nicholas II in 1912 for the dismemberment of Germany. The French Communist newspaper L'Humanité ran a front-page cover-story accusing Poincaré and Nicholas II of being the two men who plunged the world into war in 1914. The Poincaré-la-guerre propaganda proved to be very effective in the 1920s.

Throughout the spring and summer of 1922, the British continued to spurn Poincaré's offers of an alliance with Britain. Poincaré's attempt to compromise with the British on German reparations failed in 1922. By December 1922 Poincaré was faced with British-American-German hostility and saw coal for French steel production and money for reconstructing the devastated industrial areas draining away.

Poincaré decided to occupy the Ruhr on 11 January 1923, to extract the reparations himself. This, according to historian Sally Marks, "was profitable and caused neither the German hyperinflation, which began in 1922 and ballooned because of German responses to the Ruhr occupation, nor the franc's 1924 collapse, which arose from French financial practices and the evaporation of reparations." The profits, after Ruhr-Rhineland occupation costs, were nearly 900 million gold marks. During the Ruhr crisis, Poincaré made a failed attempt to establish diplomatic relations with the Soviet Union. Poincaré lost the 1924 French legislative election "more from the franc's collapse and the ensuing taxation than from diplomatic isolation."

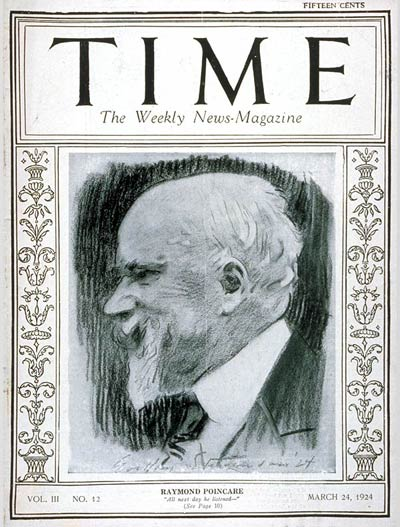
Time Cover, 24 Mar 1924

Hines H. Hall argues that Poincaré was not a vindictive nationalist. Despite his disagreements with Britain, he desired to preserve the Anglo-French entente. When he ordered the French occupation of the Ruhr valley in 1923, his aims were moderate. He did not try to revive Rhenish separatism. His major goal was the winning of German compliance with the Versailles treaty. Poincaré's inflexible methods and authoritarian personality led to the failure of his diplomacy.

== Third premiership ==
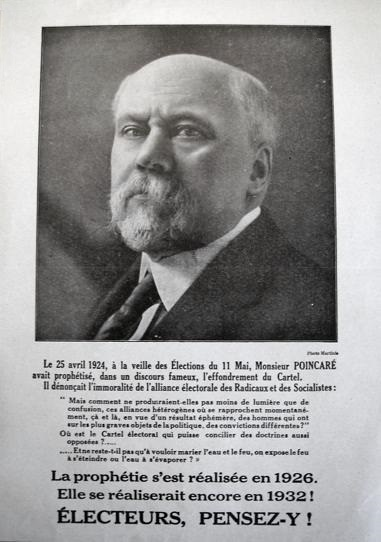
A 1932 electoral leaflet supporting Raymond Poincaré's achievements

Financial crisis brought him back to power in 1926, and he once again became prime minister and finance minister until his retirement in 1929. As prime minister, he enacted a number of franc stabilization policies, retroactively known as the Poincaré Stabilization Law. His popularity as prime minister rose considerably following his return to the gold standard, so much so that his party won the April 1928 general election.

As early as 1915, Raymond Poincaré introduced a controversial denaturalization law which was applied to naturalized French citizens with "enemy origins" who had continued to maintain their original nationality. Through another law passed in 1927, the government could denaturalize any new citizen who committed acts contrary to French "national interest".

== Resignation and death ==
Due to his ill health, Poincaré resigned as prime minister in July 1929, refusing to serve another term as prime minister. He died in Paris on 15 October 1934 at the age of 74.

== Family ==
His brother, Lucien Poincaré (1862–1920), a physicist, became inspector-general of public instruction in 1902. He is the author of La Physique moderne (1906) and L'Électricité (1907).

Jules Henri Poincaré (1854–1912), an even more distinguished physicist and mathematician, was his first cousin.

== Honors and awards ==
- Grand Cross of the Order of Legion of Honour
- Grand Cordon of the Order of Leopold
- Order of the Golden Fleece
- Knight of the Order of St. Andrew
- Grand Cross with collar of the Order of Carol I

== See also ==
- French entry into World War I
- Interwar France

== Sources ==
- Adamthwaite, Anthony (April 1999). "Review of Raymond Poincaré by J. F. V. Keiger". The English Historical Review. 114 (456): 491–492. doi:10.1093/ehr/114.456.491.
- Fromkin, David (2004). Europe's Last Summer: Who Started the Great War in 1914?. New York: Alfred A. Knopf.
- Herwig, Holger & Richard Hamilton. Decisions for War, 1914-1917 (2004)
- Keiger, J. F. V. (1997). Raymond Poincaré. Cambridge University Press. ISBN 0-521-57387-4., review
- Maisel, Ephraim (1994). The Foreign Office and Foreign Policy, 1919-1926. Sussex Academic Press. pp. 122–23.
- Marks, Sally '1918 and After. The Postwar Era', in Gordon Martel (ed.), The Origins of the Second World War Reconsidered 2nd ed. (London: Routledge, 1999)
- Mombauer, Annika (2002). The Origins of the First World War. London: Pearson.
- Smith, Leonard; Audoin-Rouzeau, Stéphane; Becker, Annette (2003). "August 1914 and the Union sacrée". France and the Great War, 1914-1918. New Approaches to European History. Cambridge University Press. p. 27. ISBN 9780521666312. OCLC 50315088.

Political offices
Preceded by Charles Dupuy	Minister of Public Instruction and Fine Arts; 1893	Succeeded by Eugène Spuller
Preceded by Charles Dupuy	Minister of Worship; 1893	Succeeded by Eugène Spuller
Preceded by Auguste Burdeau	Minister of Finance; 1894–1895	Succeeded by Alexandre Ribot
Preceded by Georges Leygues	Minister of Public Instruction and Fine Arts; 1895	Succeeded by Émile Combes
Preceded by Charles Dupuy	Minister of Worship; 1895	Succeeded by Émile Combes
Preceded by Pierre Merlou	Minister of Finance; 1906	Succeeded by Joseph Caillaux
Preceded by Joseph Caillaux	Prime Minister of France; 1912–1913	Succeeded by Aristide Briand
Preceded by Justin de Selves	Minister of Foreign Affairs; 1912–1913	Succeeded by Charles Jonnart
Preceded by Armand Fallières	President of France; 1913–1920	Succeeded by Paul Deschanel
Preceded by Aristide Briand	Prime Minister of France; 1922–1924	Succeeded by Frédéric François-Marsal
Preceded by Aristide Briand	Minister of Foreign Affairs; 1922–1924	Succeeded by Edmond Lefebvre du Prey
Preceded by Édouard Herriot	Prime Minister of France; 1926–1929	Succeeded by Aristide Briand
Preceded by Anatole de Monzie	Minister of Finance; 1926–1928	Succeeded by Henry de Chéron
Regnal titles
Preceded by Armand Fallières	Co-Prince of Andorra; 1913–1920; Served alongside: Juan Benlloch i Vivó; Jaume Viladrich i Gaspa (acting)	Succeeded by Paul Deschanel
Academic offices
Preceded by Augustine Birrell	Rector of the University of Glasgow; 1914–1919	Succeeded by Bonar Law
Awards and achievements
Preceded by Eugene O'Neill	Cover of Time magazine 24 March 1924	Succeeded by George Eastman
