= 1939–40 Lancashire Cup =

- Structure: Regional knockout championship
- Teams: 12
- Winners: Swinton
- Runners-up: Widnes

The 1939–40 Lancashire Cup was the thirty-second occasion on which the Lancashire Cup competition had been held. Due to the start of the Second World War, the competition was delayed until early 1940. Swinton won the trophy by beating Widnes on a two legged final by the score of 21–15 aggregate.

The first leg was played at Naughton Park, Widnes, and the second led was played at Station Road, Swinton.

Swinton won both legs, 5–4 away and 16–11 at home.

The attendances were 5,500 at Widnes and 9,000 at Swinton.

== Preamble to changes ==
Prior to the declaration of war on 3 September 1939, most clubs had played two or three fixtures (on Saturday 26, Thursday 31 August and Saturday 2 September).

During the following week, the Northern Rugby League decided, after publicity from the Government, to suspend the championship. They almost immediately inaugurated two regional (Lancashire and Yorkshire), Wartime Emergency Leagues, with the winner of each league meeting in a play-off final to decide the overall winner.

The Challenge Cup and both County Cups were suspended. There was to be no Lancashire Cup competition in 1939.

But later in the season both County Cups were resurrected.

The Lancashire Cup started on Saturday 2 March 1940 and was played on consecutive weekends.

Each and every match was played on a two-legged home and away basis.

=== Background ===
St Helens Recs had already withdrawn from the league immediately after the end on the 1938–39 season. The club had been struggling to survive for a few years with falling attendances and the economic depression and it was obviously not possible for the town to sustain two top teams.

The number of teams entering this year's competition decreased by one with the loss of St Helens Recs to a total of 12.

The same fixture format was retained. This season saw no byes but two "blank" or "dummy" fixture in the first round. The second round now had two byes.

The whole competition was played on the basis of two legged ties.

== Competition and results ==
=== Round 1 – First Leg ===
Involved 6 matches (with two "blank" fixture) and 12 clubs

Game No	Fixture date	Home team	Score	Away team	Venue	agg	Att	Rec	Notes	Ref
1	Sat 02 Mar 1940	Barrow	5–5	Wigan	Craven Park					
2	Sat 02 Mar 1940	Leigh	5–5	Liverpool Stanley	Mather Lane					
3	Sat 02 Mar 1940	Oldham	5–15	Rochdale Hornets	Watersheddings					
4	Sat 02 Mar 1940	St. Helens	26–7	Broughton Rangers	Knowsley Road					
5	Sat 02 Mar 1940	Swinton	7–0	Salford	Station Road					
6	Sat 02 Mar 1940	Widnes	10–7	Warrington	Naughton Park					
7		blank		blank						
8		blank		blank						

=== Round 1 – Second Leg ===
Involved 6 matches (with two "blank" fixture) and 12 clubs. The reverse fixtures of the first leg

Game No	Fixture date	Home team	Score	Away team	Venue	agg	Att	Rec	Notes	Ref
1	Sat 09 Mar 1940	Wigan	14–9	Barrow	Central Park	19–14				
2	Sat 09 Mar 1940	Liverpool Stanley	6–0	Leigh	Stanley Greyhound Stadium	11–5				
3	Sat 09 Mar 1940	Rochdale Hornets	2–4	Oldham	Athletic Grounds	17–9				
4	Sat 09 Mar 1940	Broughton Rangers	10–3	St. Helens	Belle Vue Stadium	17–29				
5	Sat 09 Mar 1940	Salford	6–6	Swinton	The Willows	6–13				
6	Sat 09 Mar 1940	Warrington	2–4	Widnes	Wilderspool	9–14				
7		blank		blank						
8		blank		blank						

=== Round 2 – quarterfinals – First Leg ===
Involved 2 matches (with two) and 6 clubs

Game No	Fixture date	Home team	Score	Away team	Venue	agg	Att	Rec	Notes	Ref
1	Sat 16 Mar 1940	Liverpool Stanley	5–2	Rochdale Hornets	Stanley Greyhound Stadium					
2	Sat 16 Mar 1940	Wigan	5–0	St. Helens	Central Park					
3		Swinton		bye						
4		Widnes		bye						

=== Round 2 – quarterfinals –Second Leg ===
Involved 2 matches (with two) and 6 clubs. The reverse fixtures of the first leg

Game No	Fixture date	Home team	Score	Away team	Venue	agg	Att	Rec	Notes	Ref
1	Sat 30 Mar 1940	Rochdale Hornets	10–0	Liverpool Stanley	Athletic Grounds	15–2				
2	Sat 30 Mar 1940	St. Helens	10–4	Wigan	Knowsley Road	10–9				
3		Swinton		bye						
4		Widnes		bye						

=== Round 3 – semifinals – First Legs ===
Involved 2 matches and 4 clubs

Game No	Fixture date	Home team	Score	Away team	Venue	agg	Att	Rec	Notes	Ref
1	Sat 06 Apr 1940	St. Helens	7–5	Widnes	Knowsley Road					
2	Sat 06 Apr 04 1940	Swinton	14–6	Rochdale Hornets	Station Road					

=== Round 3 – semifinals – Second Legs ===
Involved 2 matches and 4 clubs. The reverse fixtures of the first leg

Game No	Fixture date	Home team	Score	Away team	Venue	agg	Att	Rec	Notes	Ref
1	Sat 13 Apr 04 1940	Widnes	13–0	St. Helens	Naughton Park	18–7				
2	Sat 13 Apr 1940	Rochdale Hornets	5–9	Swinton	Athletic Grounds	11–23				

=== Final – First leg ===
Game No	Fixture date	Home team	Score	Away team	Venue	agg	Att	Rec	Notes	Ref
1	Saturday 20 April 1940	Widnes	4–5	Swinton	Naughton Park		5,500			

=== Final – Second leg ===
The reverse fixture of the first leg

Game No	Fixture date	Home team	Score	Away team	Venue	agg	Att	Rec	Notes	Ref
1	Saturday 27 April 1940	Swinton	16–11	Widnes	Station Road	21–15	9,000			

==== Teams and scorers ====
Widnes	№	Swinton
1939–40 Lancashire Cup final – First Leg.
	teams	
A. H. Woodward	1	Harold Palin
Harry Owen Snr.	2	Bill Hopkin
Peter Topping	3	Randall Lewis
Norman Rutledge	4	Billy Shaw
Alan Evans	5	Jack McGurk
Tommy Shannon	6	Tommy Bartram
Tommy McCue	7	Frank Bowyer
J. Sutcliffe	8	Joe Wright
Paddy Hynan	9	Tommy Armitt
Bill Hoey	10	Gomer Hughes
Hugh McDowell	11	Martin Hodgson
Bob Williamson	12	Cledwyn Williams
Bob Roberts	13	Fred Garner
4	score	5
2	HT	3
	Scorers	
	Tries	
	T	Fred Garner (1)
	Goals	
Topping (2)	G	Martin Hodgson (1)
	Drop Goals	
	DG	
Referee		

Swinton	№	Widnes
1939–40 Lancashire Cup final – Second Leg.
	teams	
Harold Palin	1	A. H. Woodward
Bill Hopkin	2	A. H. Evans
Randall Lewis	3	Peter Topping
Billy Shaw	4	Norman Rutledge
Jack McGurk	5	Alan Evans
Arthur Hickman	6	Tommy Shannon
Frank Bowyer	7	Tommy McCue
Joe Wright	8	Bob Williamson
Tommy Armitt	9	Paddy Hynan
Gomer Hughes	10	Ernie Miller
Martin Hodgson	11	Hugh McDowell
Cledwyn Williams	12	Bob Roberts
Fred Garner	13	Bill Hoey
16	score	11
6	HT	2
	Scorers	
	Tries	
Joe Wright (1)	T	Norman Rutledge (1)
Randall Lewis (1)	T	
	Goals	
Martin Hodgson (5)	G	Peter Topping (2)
	G	Tommy Shannon (1)
	G	Bill Hoey (1)
	Drop Goals	
	DG	(One of the above goals was a DG)
Referee		

Scoring – Try = three (3) points – Goal = two (2) points – Drop goal = two (2) points

=== The road to success ===
ALL ties were played on a two leg (home and away) basis

The first club named in each tie played the first leg at home

The scores shown are the aggregate score over the two legs

First round
Barrow	14
Wigan	19
St. Helens	29
Broughton Rangers	17
Swinton	13
Salford	6
blank
blank
Widnes	14
Warrington	9
blank
blank
Leigh	5
Liverpool Stanley	11
Oldham	9
Rochdale Hornets	17

Second round
Wigan	9
St. Helens	10
Swinton
bye
Widnes
bye
Liverpool Stanley	2
Rochdale Hornets	15

Semifinals
St. Helens	7
Widnes	18
Swinton	23
Rochdale Hornets	11

Final
Widnes	15
Swinton'	21

== Notes and comments ==
This would be the last year of the Lancashire Cup until season 1945–46.

In the in-between years, many Lancashire clubs were invited (and accepted the invitation) to take part in the Yorkshire Cup competition.

== See also ==
- 1939–40 Northern Rugby Football League Wartime Emergency League season
- Rugby league county cups
