= Harry Millington =

Harry Millington may refer to:

- Harry Millington (rugby league)
- Harry Millington (politician)
