= 1936–37 Challenge Cup =

Rugby league competition

- Duration: 5 Rounds
- Number of teams: 32
- Winners: Widnes
- Runners-up: Keighley

The 1936–37 Challenge Cup was the 37th tournament of rugby league's oldest trophy, the Challenge Cup. 32 clubs entered the competition which was won by Widnes who beat Keighley 18–5 in the final at Wembley Stadium on 8 May 1937. This was Widnes' second win in the competition and, to date, Keighley's only appearance in the final.

== First round ==
The first round draw was made on 13 January 1937. 16 ties were drawn that were played on 13 February 1937.

Home	Score	Away	Match information
Home	Score	Away	Referee	Attendance	Receipts
Bramley	0–6	Dewsbury	L Greenwood	3,400	£167
Goole	2–14	Broughton Rangers	J Orford	2,500	£100
Hunslet	2–5	Keighley	A E Harding	10,300	£553
Leigh	0–28	Liverpool Stanley	A Brown	3,000	£144
Oldham	4–15	Wigan	A S Dobson	18,000	£1075
Rochdale Hornets	0–10	Hull F.C.	A Hill	7,200	£396
St. Helens	4–11	Huddersfield	F Peel	7,000	£285
Salford	4–10	Warrington	J E Taylor	26,700	£1,647
Halifax	8–2	Barrow	J Edden	9,000	£650
Hull Kingston Rovers	13–5	St Helens Recreation	J W Webb	7,000	£288
Bradford Northern	39–0	Streatham and Mitcham	B Timility	10,000	not given
Swinton	9–5	Newcastle	L Thorpe	4,238	£190
Wakefield Trinity	2–0	Leeds	F Fairhurst	18,600	£1,109
Widnes	39–2	Higginshaw	B Laughlin	4,000	£241
York	18–4	Featherstone Rovers	A Holbrook	3,797	£188
Batley	2–2	Castleford	P Cowell	10,400	£550

=== First round replay ===
The replay between Castleford and Batley was played on the Wednesday 17 February 1937.

Home	Score	Away	Match information
Home	Score	Away	Referee	Attendance	Receipts
Castleford	8–4	Batley	P Cowell	10,875	£522/10/-

== Second round ==
The draw for the second round was made on 15 February 1937 with the eight ties schedules 27 February. Only six ties were played that day as heavy snow forced the postponement of the game at Bradford and the match between Widnes and Dewsbury was abandoned at half-time with the score 8–0 to Widnes.

Home	Score	Away	Match information
Home	Score	Away	Referee	Attendance	Receipts
Keighley	11–5	Broughton Rangers	A Holbrook	9,000	£454
Castleford	5–5	Wigan Warriors	A E Harding	21,000	£1,192
Halifax	4–5	Wakefield Trinity	P Cowell	20,000	£1,189
Bradford Northern	2–12 (Note: Played 3 March 1937)	Huddersfield	F Fairhurst	19,387	£1,340
Widnes	8–0 (Note: Match abandoned at half-time)	Dewsbury	A Hill	7,000	£320
Hull Kingston Rovers	2–7	Liverpool Stanley	J Orford	15,000	539
Swinton	10–8	Hull F.C.	A S Dobson	10,348	£542
York	4–5	Warrington	J W Webb	12,124	£718

=== Second round replays ===
The replay between Castleford and Wigan was played on the Wednesday 3 March 1937 and the rescheduled Widnes v Dewsbury game was played on Thursday 4 March.

Home	Score	Away	Match information
Home	Score	Away	Referee	Attendance	Receipts
Castleford	6–13	Wigan	F Peel	26,000	£1,200
Widnes	12–7	Dewsbury	A Hill	8,000	£383

== Third round ==
The third round draw was made on 1 March, ties were due to be played on 13 March, but the weather played a part again and the match between Huddersfield and Wigan was postponed and played on 17 March.

Home	Score	Away	Match information
Home	Score	Away	Referee	Attendance	Receipts
Liverpool Stanley	2–7	Keighley	F Peel	9,000	£499
Huddersfield	7–8	Wigan Warriors	A Holbrook	17,000	£1,100
Wakefield Trinity	5–0	Warrington	A E Harding	22,075	£1,237
Widnes	7–2	Swinton	J E Taylor	11,220	£612

== Semi-finals ==
The draw for the semi-finals was delayed until the third round tie between Huddersfield and Wigan had been played and was made on 18 March. The semi-finals were played at neutral venues on Saturday 3 April.

First team drawn	Score	Second team drawn	Match information
First team drawn	Score	Second team drawn	Venue	Referee	Attendance	Receipts
Widnes	12–9	Wigan	Wilderspool, Warrington	F Peel	29,260	£1,973
Wakefield Trinity	0–0	Keighley	Headingley, Leeds	A E Harding	39,998	£2,793

=== Semi-final replay ===
Wakefield and Keighley met to replay their tie at Fartown Huddersfield on 7 April.

First team drawn	Score	Second team drawn	Match information
First team drawn	Score	Second team drawn	Venue	Referee	Attendance	Receipts
Wakefield Trinity	3–5	Keighley	Fartown, Huddersfield	A E Harding	14,400	£1,072

== Final ==
8 May 1937
3:00 pm BST

Widnes	18 – 5	Keighley
Tries: Shannon; McCue; Barber; Silcock; Goals: Topping (3)		Tries: Lloyd; Goals: Sherburn

Wembley Stadium, London
Attendance: 47,699
Referee: P Cowell

Team details
Widnes		Position	Keighley
Name	Number	Position	Number	Name
Walter Bradley	1	Fullback	1	Iorwerth Herbert
Frank Whyte	2	Wing	2	Joseph Sherburn
Peter Topping	3	Centre	3	Idris Towill
Ken Barber	4	Centre	4	Gwyn Parker
Alan Evans	5	Wing	5	Reg Lloyd
Tommy Shannon	6	Stand off	6	Llewellyn Bevan
Tommy McCue	7	Scrum half	7	Dai Davies
Nat Silcock (c)	8	Prop forward	8	James Traill
Jimmy Jones	9	Hooker	9	Cyril Halliday
Alec Higgins	10	Prop forward	10	Hal Jones
Hugh McDowell	11	Second row	11	George Dixon
Bob Roberts	12	Second row	12	Fred Talbot
Harry Millington	13	Loose forward	13	James Gill

Widnes and Keighley met in the final at Wembley Stadium on 8 May 1937. Widnes went 5–0 up within the first ten minutes as Tommy Shannon scored a try which Peter Topping converted. Just before the half-hour mark, Widnes scored another try as Tommy McCue over to give Widnes an 8–0 lead which remained the score at half-time. Immediately after the second half kicked off, Keighley were awarded a penalty which Joseph Sherburn kicked to reduce Widnes' lead to six points. Some Keighley pressure came to nothing and Ken Barber intercepted a pass to score Widnes' third try which Topping converted. Five minutes later Widnes' put the game beyond Keighley's reach as captain Nat Silcock scored their fourth try. Topping missed the conversion but made amends by kicking a penalty after an hours play. With the score 18–2 with minutes left to play, Keighley scored their only try as Reg Lloyd went over making the final score 18–5 to Widnes. The attendance or the game was 47,699 and the gate receipts totalled £6,579.
