= Harry Dale =

Harry Dale may refer to:

- Harry H. Dale (1868–1935), U.S. Representative from New York
- Harry Dale (footballer) (1899–1985), English association (soccer) football goalkeeper
- Harry Dale (rugby league) (1908/09–1970), English rugby league footballer who played in the 1920s and 1930s

== See also ==
- Harry Daley (1901–1971), the first openly gay British policeman
- Henry Dale (disambiguation)
