= 1929–30 Yorkshire Cup =

- Structure: Regional knockout championship
- Teams: 15
- Winners: Hull Kingston Rovers
- Runners-up: Hunslet

The 1929–30 Yorkshire Cup was the twenty-second occasion on which the Yorkshire Cup competition was held. Hull Kingston Rovers won the trophy for the second time in their history, beating Hunslet in the final by the score of 13–7. The match was played at Headingley, Leeds, now in West Yorkshire. The attendance was 11,000 and receipts were £687.

== Background ==
The Rugby Football League's Yorkshire Cup was a knock-out competition between (mainly professional) rugby league clubs from the county of Yorkshire. The actual area was at times increased to encompass other teams from outside the county such as Newcastle, Mansfield, Coventry, and even London (in the form of Acton & Willesden. The Rugby League season always (until the onset of "Summer Rugby" in 1996) ran from around August-time through to around May-time and this competition always took place early in the season, in the Autumn, with the final taking place in (or just before) December (The only exception to this was when disruption of the fixture list was caused during, and immediately after, the two World Wars).

== Competition and results ==
This season there were no junior/amateur clubs taking part, no new entrants and no "leavers" and so the total of entries remained the same at fifteen. This in turn resulted in three byes in the first round.

=== Round 1 ===
Involved 7 matches (with one bye) and 15 clubs

Game No	Fixture date	Home team	Score	Away team	Venue	Ref
1	Sat 19 Oct 1929	Bramley	2–0	York	Barley Mow	
2	Sat 19 Oct 1929	Dewsbury	16–10	Featherstone Rovers	Crown Flatt	
3	Sat 19 Oct 1929	Halifax	18–5	Castleford	Thrum Hall	
4	Sat 19 Oct 1929	Hull	21–4	Wakefield Trinity	Boulevard	
5	Sat 19 Oct 1929	Hull Kingston Rovers	8–3	Huddersfield	Craven Park (1)	
6	Sat 19 Oct 1929	Keighley	9–7	Bradford Northern	Lawkholme Lane	
7	Sat 19 Oct 1929	Leeds	5–11	Hunslet	Headingley	
8		Batley		bye		

=== Round 2 – quarterfinals ===
Involved 4 matches and 8 clubs

Game No	Fixture date	Home team	Score	Away team	Venue	Ref
1	Mon 28 Oct 1929	Halifax	0–3	Hull Kingston Rovers	Thrum Hall	
2	Tue 29 Oct 1929	Keighley	4–0	Dewsbury	Lawkholme Lane	
3	Wed 30 Oct 1929	Bramley	17–8	Batley	Barley Mow	
4	Thu 31 Oct 1929	Hull	4–8	Hunslet	Boulevard	

=== Round 3 – semifinals ===
Involved 2 matches and 4 clubs

Game No	Fixture date	Home team	Score	Away team	Venue	Ref
1	Tue 12 Nov 1929	Keighley	0–3	Hunslet	Lawkholme Lane	
2	Thu 14 Nov 1929	Hull Kingston Rovers	15–5	Bramley	Craven Park (1)	

=== Final ===
30 November 1929

Hull Kingston Rovers	13 – 7	Hunslet F.C.
Tries: Rainton, Dale, Spamer; Goals: Osborne (2)		Tries: Jenkins; Goals: Traill (2)

Headingley, Leeds
Attendance: 11,000
Referee: F. Fairhurst (Wigan)

==== Teams ====
Hull Kingston Rovers	No.	Hunslet
	Teams	
Laurie Osborne	1	Jack Walkington
G. W. Bateman	2	John Rhodes
J. Cook	3	Johnny Coulson
J. Jordan	4	Harry Beverley
H. Rainton (Tacker Rainton?)	5	George Broughton
Harry Dale	6	George Todd
Jack Spamer	7	Billy Thornton
xBenjamin "Ben" Britton	8	David Morgan Jenkins
G. Sharp (L. Sharpe?)	9	Henry Moss
H. Roberts	10	James Traill
Harold Binks	11	Dolly Dawson
C. W. Westerdale (William "Bill" Westerdale?)	12	Hector Crowther
Harry Williams	13	George Chapman
William 'Billy' Jacques	Coach	??

=== The road to success ===
First round
Halifax	18
Castleford	5
Hull Kingston Rovers	8
Huddersfield	3
Bramley	2
York	0
Batley
bye
Keighley	9
Bradford Northern	7
Dewsbury	16
Featherstone Rovers	10
Hull	21
Wakefield Trinity	4
Leeds	5
Hunslet	11

Second round
Halifax	0
Hull Kingston Rovers	3
Bramley	17
Batley	8
Keighley	4
Dewsbury	0
Hull	4
Hunslet	8

Semifinals
Hull Kingston Rovers	15
Bramley	5
Keighley	0
Hunslet	3

Final
Hull Kingston Rovers	13
Hunslet	7

== See also ==
- 1929–30 Northern Rugby Football League season
- Rugby league county cups
