= Cyril Morrell =

England international rugby league footballer

Personal information
- Full name: Cyril Morrall
- Born: 9 February 1911 Middleton, Yorkshire, England
- Died: 1975 (aged 64) Leeds, Yorkshire, England

Playing information
- Position: Centre
Club
Years	Team	Pld	T	G	FG	P
1931–46	Hunslet	372	138	0	0	414
1941	→ Castleford (guest)	1	0	0	0	0
1943	→ Featherstone Rovers (guest)	2	0	0	0	0
	Total	375	138	0	0	414
Representative
Years	Team	Pld	T	G	FG	P
1938–39	England	3	0	0	0	0

Cyril Morrall or Morrell (Note: His surname is spelt Morrell frequently in newspaper accounts but is Morrall in all official documents, such as the record of his wedding. The 1939 England and Wales Registry has his name spelt Morrell and then corrected to Morrall. His father Josiah also frequently spelt the name Morrell.) (9 February 1911 – 1975) was an English professional rugby league footballer who played in the 1930s. He played at representative level for England, and at club level for Hunslet and Castleford (as a wartime guest), as a centre.

== Playing career ==
=== International honours ===
Morrell won caps for England while at Hunslet in 1938 against France, and Wales, and in 1939 against France.

=== Championship final appearances ===
Morrell played at centre in Hunslet's 8–2 victory over Leeds in the Championship Final during the 1937–38 season at Elland Road, Leeds on Saturday 30 April 1938.

=== Challenge Cup ===
Morrell played centre, and broke his collar bone in the 26th minute whilst scoring a try, in Hunslet's 11–5 victory over Widnes in the 1933–34 Challenge Cup Final during the 1933–34 season at Wembley Stadium, London on Saturday 5 May 1934, as interchange/substitutes were not allowed, this meant Hunslet played more than half the match with 12-men.

== Personal life ==
In 1940, Morrell married Annie Marie Smith, niece of the late Bill Jukes, in Hunslet.
