= Henry Dale =

Henry Dale may refer to:

- Henry Hallett Dale (1875–1968), English pharmacologist and physiologist
- Henry Dale (MP) for Bristol

== See also ==
- Harry Dale (disambiguation)
