= Iorwerth Herbert =

Welsh rugby footballer

Personal information
- Born: 21 July 1910; Resolven, Neath, Wales
- Died: 24 August 1976 (aged 66); Resolven, Neath, Wales

Playing information

Rugby union
- Position: Full-back
Club
Years	Team	Pld	T	G	FG	P
1931–33	Swansea
1933–34	Neath
	Total	0	0	0	0	0

Rugby league
- Position: Fullback
Club
Years	Team	Pld	T	G	FG	P
1934–37	Keighley

Iorwerth Herbert (21 July 1910 – 24 August 1976) was a Welsh rugby union and rugby league footballer who played in the 1920s and 1930s.

Born in Resolven in South Wales Herbert joined Swansea rugby union club in 1931. By January 1934 he was playing for Neath but in August of the same year he changed codes and joined Keighley as a professional rugby league player. Only the previous October the secretary of the Welsh Rugby Union, Walter Rees had stated "that no player who signed for Rugby League club, even though he changed his mind about the matter and did not actually take part in a Rugby League match, would be allowed to play again for a Rugby Union club." Herbert's move to the professional game may therefore have caused difficulties with his father, Thomas Herbert, who was a vice-president of the Welsh Rugby Union.

Herbert remained at Keighley until 1937 and in that time helped Keighley reach the final of the 1937 Challenge Cup but while he played in the final he came away with a loser's medal as Keighley lost 5–18 to Widnes. Immediately after the Challenge Cup final Herbert was placed on the transfer list by Keighley for a fee of £100. By 1939 Herbert was recorded in the 1939 register as living back in Neath where he was a bricklayer.

Herbert died in August 1976.
