= Robert Roberts (rugby league) =

England international rugby league footballer

Bob Roberts
Personal information
- Full name: Robert Thomas Roberts
- Born: 18 February 1912; Prescot district, England
- Died: September 1979 (aged 67); St. Helens, England

Playing information
- Height: 5 ft 10 in (178 cm)
- Weight: 13 st 7 lb (86 kg)
- Position: Centre, Prop, Hooker, Second-row, Loose forward
Club
Years	Team	Pld	T	G	FG	P
1933–47	Widnes	217	36	4	0	659
1947–48	St. Helens	26	1	0	0	3
	Total	243	37	4	0	662
Representative
Years	Team	Pld	T	G	FG	P
1939–40	England	2	0	0	0	0

Robert Thomas Roberts (18 February 1912 – September 1979) was an English professional rugby league footballer who played in the 1930s and 1940s. He played at representative level for England, and at club level for Widnes and St Helens, as a centre, prop, hooker, second-row or loose forward.

== Background ==
Bob Roberts' birth was registered in Prescot district, Lancashire, England, he was living in Gartons Lane, St. Helens and working as a clerk at a weighbridge c. 1939, and he died aged 67 in St. Helens, Merseyside, England.

== Playing career ==
=== International honours ===
Roberts won caps for England while at Widnes in 1939 against Wales, and in 1940 against Wales.

=== Championship final appearances ===
Roberts played in Widnes' 2-21 defeat by Hull F.C. in the Championship Final during the 1935–36 season.

=== Challenge Cup Final appearances ===
Roberts played in Widnes' 18-5 victory over Keighley in the 1936–37 Challenge Cup Final during the 1936–37 season at Wembley Stadium, London on Saturday 8 May 1937.

=== County Cup Final appearances ===
Roberts played loose forward in Widnes' 4-5 defeat by Swinton in the 1939–40 Lancashire Cup Final first-leg during the 1939–40 season at Naughton Park, Widnes on Saturday 20 April 1940, and played at second-row in the 11-16 defeat (15-21 aggregate defeat) by Swinton in the 1939–40 Lancashire Cup Final second-leg during the 1939–40 season at Station Road, Swinton on Saturday 27 April 1940, and played at second-row in Widnes' 7-3 victory over Wigan in the 1945–46 Lancashire Cup Final during the 1945–46 season at Wilderspool Stadium, Warrington on Saturday 27 October 1945.

=== Club career ===
Roberts made his début for Widnes as a centre against Barrow at Craven Park, Barrow-in-Furness on Monday 17 April 1933, and he played his last match for Widnes against Bradford Northern at Odsal Stadium, Bradford on Saturday 27 September 1947, he left Widnes for St. Helens for £800/£1000 (based on increases in average earnings, this would be approximately £71,110/£88,887 in 2013), and he made his début for St. Helens in the 24-3 victory over Swinton at Knowsley Road, St. Helens on Saturday 4 October 1947, and he played his last match for St. Helens in the 10-12 defeat by Keighley at Lawkholme Lane, Keighley on Saturday 23 October 1948.
