= Reg Lloyd =

Wales international rugby league footballer

Personal information
- Full name: Reginald G. Lloyd
- Born: second ¼ 1917; Resolven, Wales
- Died: unknown

Playing information

Rugby union
Club
Years	Team	Pld	T	G	FG	P
≤1937–37	Resolven RFC

Rugby league
- Position: Wing
Club
Years	Team	Pld	T	G	FG	P
1937–38	Keighley
1938–51	Castleford	248	59	0	0	177
	Total	248	59	0	0	177
Representative
Years	Team	Pld	T	G	FG	P
1942	Northern Command XIII	1
1946–47	Wales	7

Reginald G. Lloyd (second ¼ 1917 – death unknown), also known by the nickname of "Wolla", was a Welsh rugby union and professional rugby league footballer who played in the 1930s and 1940s. He played club level rugby union (RU) for Resolven RFC, and representative level rugby league (RL) for Wales, and at club level for Keighley and Castleford, as a wing. Reg Lloyd was a Corporal in the British Army during World War II.

== Playing career ==
=== International honours ===
Lloyd won caps for Wales (RL) while at Castleford in 1946 against England (2 matches) and France, and in 1947 against France (2 matches), New Zealand, and England.

=== Challenge Cup Final appearances ===
Reg Lloyd played on the wing, scored a try, and aged-19 was youngest player ever to appear in a Wembley Final, in Keighley's 5–18 defeat by Widnes in the 1937 Challenge Cup Final during the 1936-37 season at Wembley Stadium, London on Saturday 8 May 1937, in front of a crowd of 47,699.

=== County League appearances ===
Reg Lloyd played in Castleford's victory in the Yorkshire League during the 1938–39 season.

=== Other notable matches ===
Reg Lloyd played on the wing for Northern Command XIII against a Rugby League XIII at Thrum Hall, Halifax on Saturday 21 March 1942.
