= Thomas Shannon (rugby league) =

England international rugby league footballer and coach

Personal information
- Full name: Thomas Shannon
- Born: 7 January 1910 Widnes, Lancashire
- Died: December 1986 (aged 76) Widnes, Cheshire

Playing information
- Position: Stand-off
Club
| Years | Team | Pld | T | G | FG | P |
|---|---|---|---|---|---|---|
| 1930–46 | Widnes | 299 | 76 | 1 | 0 | 230 |
| 1940–40 | → Wigan (guest) | 1 | 0 | 0 | 0 | 0 |
| 1941–41 | → St Helens (guest) | 3 | 1 | 0 | 0 | 3 |
| 1941 | → Oldham (guest) | 8 | 3 | 0 | 0 | 9 |
| | Total | 311 | 80 | 1 | 0 | 242 |
Representative
| Years | Team | Pld | T | G | FG | P |
| 1938 | England | 2 | 1 | 0 | 0 | 3 |

Coaching information
Club
| Years | Team | Gms | W | D | L | W% |
| 1949–5? | Widnes | 0 | 0 | 0 | 0 |

Thomas Shannon (1910 – 1986) was an English professional rugby league footballer who played in the 1930s and 1940s, and coached in the 1950s. He played at representative level for England, and at club level for Widnes, as a stand-off, and coached at club level for Widnes. He also appeared for Wigan, St Helens and Oldham RLFC as a World War II guest player.

== Playing career ==
=== Club career ===
Shannon played stand-off in Widnes' 5-11 defeat by Hunslet in the 1933–34 Challenge Cup Final during the 1933–34 season at Wembley Stadium, London on Saturday 5 May 1934, and scored a try in the 18-5 victory over Keighley in the 1936–37 Challenge Cup Final during the 1936–37 season at Wembley Stadium, London on Saturday 8 May 1937.

Shannon played stand-off in Widnes' 4-5 defeat by Swinton in the 1939–40 Lancashire Cup Final first-leg during the 1939–40 season at Naughton Park, Widnes on Saturday 20 April 1940, and played stand-off in the 11-16 defeat (15-21 aggregate defeat) by Swinton in the 1939–40 Lancashire Cup Final second-leg during the 1939–40 season at Station Road, Swinton on Saturday 27 April 1940.

=== International honours ===
Shannon won caps for England while at Widnes in 1938 against Wales (2 matches).
