= George Broughton =

England international rugby league footballer

Personal information
- Full name: George Broughton

Playing information
- Position: Wing
Club
Years	Team	Pld	T	G	FG	P
1923–25	Leeds	76	42			126
1925–35	Hunslet	348	194	2	0	586
	Total	424	236	2	0	712
Representative
Years	Team	Pld	T	G	FG	P
1924–28	Yorkshire	5	0	0	0	0
1924	England	1	0	0	0	0
- Relatives: George Broughton Jr. (son)

George Broughton was an English professional rugby league footballer who played in the 1920s. He played at representative level for England, and at club level for Leeds and Hunslet F.C., as a wing.

== Playing career ==
=== Club career ===
Broughton made his début for Leeds against Barrow at Little Park Roose, Barrow-in-Furness on Wednesday 5 September 1923.

Broughton played on the wing in the Hunslet FC's 7-13 defeat by Hull Kingston Rovers in the 1929–30 Yorkshire Cup Final during the 1929–30 season at Headingley, Leeds on Saturday 30 November 1929, in front of a crowd of 11,000.

Broughton played on the wing in Hunslet's 11-5 victory over Widnes in the 1933–34 Challenge Cup Final during the 1933–34 season at Wembley Stadium, London on Saturday 5 May 1934, in front of a crowd of 41,280.

=== International honours ===
Broughton won a cap for England while at Leeds in 1924 against Other Nationalities.

== Personal life ==
Broughton was the father of the rugby league footballer; George Broughton Jr.
