= George Broughton Jr. =

English rugby league footballer

George Broughton
Personal information
- Full name: George Broughton
- Born: 22 April 1930 (age 96) Leeds, England

Playing information
- Position: Wing
Club
Years	Team	Pld	T	G	FG	P
1949–52	Castleford	92	37	0	0	111
1952–58	Leeds	146	99	0	0	297
	Total	238	136	0	0	408
Representative
Years	Team	Pld	T	G	FG	P
1953–55	Yorkshire	3	1	0	0	3
- Father: George Broughton

George Broughton Jr. is an English former professional rugby league footballer who played in the 1940s and 1950s. He played at club for Castleford and Leeds, as a wing.

== Playing career ==
=== Club career ===
George Broughton Jr. made his début for Leeds against Warrington at Headingley, Leeds on Saturday 6 December 1952. George Broughton Jr. was the Leeds' top try scorer during the 1955–56 season, and scored two tries in Leeds' 10-9 victory over Whitehaven in the 1956–57 Challenge Cup semi-final during the 1956–57 season at Odsal Stadium, Bradford on Saturday 30 March 1957.

Broughton Jr. played on the wing in Leeds' 9-7 victory over Barrow in the 1956–57 Challenge Cup Final during the 1956–57 season at Wembley Stadium, London on Saturday 11 May 1957, in front of a crowd of 76,318.

== Personal life ==
George Broughton Jr. is the son of the rugby league footballer; George Broughton.

== Outside rugby league ==
Following his retirement from rugby George Broughton Jr. became the landlord of the now demolished Chained Bull public house in Moortown.
