= David Morgan Jenkins =

GB & Wales rugby league & Wales RU footballer

David Jenkins
Personal information
- Full name: David Morgan Jenkins
- Born: 22 May 1901; Pyle, Wales
- Died: 22 April 1968 (aged 66); Bridgend, Wales

Playing information

Rugby union
- Position: Lock
Representative
Years	Team	Pld	T	G	FG	P
1926	Wales	4	0	0	0	0

Rugby league
- Position: Prop
Club
Years	Team	Pld	T	G	FG	P
1926–31	Hunslet	226	48	1	0	146
1932–34	Leeds
1934–??	Dewsbury
	Total	226	48	1	0	146
Representative
Years	Team	Pld	T	G	FG	P
1927	Glamorgan	≥1
1927–32	Wales	4	1	0	0	3
1929	Other Nationalities	1	0	0	0	0
1929	Great Britain	1	0	0	0	0

David "Dai" Morgan Jenkins (22 May 1901 – 22 April 1968) was a Welsh dual-code international rugby union, and professional rugby league footballer who played in the 1920s and 1930s. As an amateur union player he represented Kenfig Hill, Treorchy and Glamorgan Police RFC, while as a professional rugby league footballer he played for Hunslet, Leeds and Dewsbury.

== Playing career ==
Jenkins first played rugby as a school boy, representing Bryndu School in Kenfig Hill. A keen sportsman as a youth, he also enjoyed association football, and had trials with Swansea AFC. After leaving school he joined local club Kenfig Hill, but by the time he was selected to represent Wales in 1926, he had switched to Rhondda team, Treorchy. His first international appearance was in the opening Wales game of the 1926 Five Nations Championship; played against England at the Cardiff Arms Park. The game ended in a 3–3 draw, but Jenkins had done enough to secure his place with the Welsh selectors, and was chosen for the three remaining games of the Championship: a loss away to Scotland, followed by wins over Ireland and France. It is unknown if Jenkins would have been selected for any further rugby union internationals as in August 1926 he switched codes, becoming a professional rugby league footballer with Hunslet.

Dai Jenkins won three caps for Wales while at Hunslet, his first on 26 April 1927 in an encounter with England at Broughton. This was followed by another two caps in 1928 and 1931, both games against England. The 1928 match, played at Cardiff, saw Jenkins score a try, the only international points of his career. In 1931 he switched from Hunslet to Leeds, and in 1932 won his final cap for Wales, in his fourth encounter with England, and all resulting in losses for Wales. In 1934 he moved clubs again, switching from Leeds to Dewsbury.

David Morgan Jenkins played at prop in Glamorgan's 18-14 victory over Monmouthshire in the non-County Championship match during the 1926–27 season at Taff Vale Park, Pontypridd on Saturday 30 April 1927.

David Morgan Jenkins played at prop, and scored a try in the Hunslet FC's 7-13 defeat by Hull Kingston Rovers in the 1929–30 Yorkshire Cup Final during the 1929–30 season at Headingley, Leeds on Saturday 30 November 1929, in front of a crowd of 11,000.
