= Harold Palin =

GB & England international rugby league footballer

Harry Palin

Personal information
- Full name: Harold Palin
- Born: 19 August 1916 Warrington, England
- Died: 16 September 1990 (aged 74) Warrington, England

Playing information
- Height: 5 ft 10 in (1.78 m)
- Weight: 16 st 0 lb (102 kg)
- Position: Fullback, Loose forward
Club
Years	Team	Pld	T	G	FG	P
1936	Warrington	3	0	0	0	0
1937–47	Swinton	79	6	16	0	50
1947–51	Warrington	147	32	436	3	974
1951–52	Halifax	26	3	55	0	119
1952–53	Keighley	31	1	112		227
	Total	286	42	619	3	1370
Representative
Years	Team	Pld	T	G	FG	P
1947–48	England	3	0	2	0	4
1947	Great Britain	2	2	0	0	6
1946–48	Lancashire	5	2	5	0	16

Harold Palin (19 August 1916 – 16 September 1990), also known by the nickname of "Moggy", was an English professional rugby league footballer who played in the 1930s, 1940s and 1950s. He played at representative level for Great Britain and England, and at club level for Warrington (two spells) (captain), Swinton, Halifax and Keighley (captain), as a goal-kicking fullback or loose forward. Harold Palin's nickname of 'Moggy' was given to him as a child due to cat-like abilities, however he was not particularly fond of the nickname.

== Background ==
Palin was born in Warrington, Lancashire, England, and he died aged 74 in Warrington, Cheshire, England.

== Playing career ==
=== Championship final appearances ===
Palin played loose forward, and was captain in Warrington's 15–5 victory over Bradford Northern in the Championship Final during the 1947–48 season at Maine Road, Manchester.

=== Challenge Cup Final appearances ===
Palin played loose forward, scored a drop goal, and four goals in Warrington's 19–0 victory over Widnes in the 1949–50 Challenge Cup Final during the 1949–50 season at Wembley Stadium, London on Saturday 6 May 1950, in front of a crowd of 94,249.

=== County Cup Final appearances ===
Palin played fullback in Swinton's 5–4 victory over Widnes in the 1939–40 Lancashire Cup Final first-leg during the 1939–40 season at Naughton Park, Widnes on Saturday 20 April 1940, played fullback in the 16–11 victory over Widnes in the 1939–40 Lancashire Cup Final second-leg during the 1939–40 season at Station Road, Swinton on Saturday 27 April 1940, played loose forward, and scored a goal in Warrington's 8–14 defeat by Wigan in the 1948–49 Lancashire Cup Final during the 1948–49 season at Station Road, Swinton on Saturday 13 November 1948, and played loose forward, and scored a goal in Warrington's 5–28 defeat by Wigan in the 1950–51 Lancashire Cup Final during the 1950–51 season at Station Road, Swinton on Saturday 4 November 1950.

=== Playing career ===
Palin made his début for Keighley, played fullback, and scored 4-goals in the 17–11 victory over Castleford at Wheldon Road on Saturday 27 September 1952, by the end of 1952–53 season he had beaten Keighley's 46-year-old "most goals in a season" record that was previously set by Bob Walker during the 1906–07 season, after landing his 81st conversion in the last match of the season at York, Harold Palin was later sent off by the referee, he played eight matches during the 1953–54 season, and following the arrival of Bert Cook from Leeds, Harold Palin retired from playing aged 37.

=== International honours ===
Palin won caps for England while at Warrington in 1947 against Wales, in 1948 against France, and won caps for Great Britain while at Warrington in 1947 against New Zealand (2 matches).

== Honoured at Warrington Wolves ==
Harold Palin is a Warrington Wolves Hall of Fame inductee.
