= Harold Jones (rugby, born 1907) =

Wales dual-code international rugby footballer

Personal information
- Full name: Harold James Jones
- Born: 22 December 1907 Ogmore Vale, Wales
- Died: 16 October 1955 (aged 47) Staincliffe, Batley, England

Playing information

Rugby union
- Position: Lock
Club
Years	Team	Pld	T	G	FG	P
≤1929–29	Neath RFC
	Maesteg RFC
1929–30	Cardiff RFC	17
	Glamorgan Police RFC
	Glamorgan County RFC
	Total	17	0	0	0	0
Representative
Years	Team	Pld	T	G	FG	P
1929	Wales	2	0	0	0	0

Rugby league
- Position: Prop, Second-row
Club
Years	Team	Pld	T	G	FG	P
1929–33	Wigan	108	23			69
≤1935–≥36	Keighley
	Total	108	23	0	0	69
Representative
Years	Team	Pld	T	G	FG	P
1935–36	Wales	3	0	0	0	0

Harold "Hal" James Jones (22 December 1907 – 16 October 1955) was a Welsh rugby union, and professional rugby league footballer who played in the 1920s and 1930s. He played representative level rugby union (RU) for Wales, and at club level for Neath RFC, Maesteg RFC, Cardiff RFC, Glamorgan Police RFC and Glamorgan County RFC, as a lock and representative level rugby league (RL) for Wales, and at club level for Wigan and Keighley as a prop, or second-row.

== Background ==
Hal Jones was born in Ogmore Vale, Wales, he and his wife; Ida were the landlord, and landlady of The Goat public house in Steeton, West Riding of Yorkshire, England, and he died aged 47 in Staincliffe, Batley, West Riding of Yorkshire.

== Playing career ==
=== Rugby league career ===
Harold Jones made his début for Wigan in the 7–8 defeat by Leigh at Mather Lane (adjacent to the Bridgewater Canal), Leigh on Saturday 31 August 1929, he scored his first try for Wigan in the 23–6 victory over Wakefield Trinity at Central Park, Wigan on Wednesday 1 January 1930, he scored his last try for Wigan in the 15–8 victory over Widnes at Naughton Park, Widnes on Saturday 4 March 1933, he played his last match for Wigan in the 10–11 defeat by Halifax at Thrum Hall, Halifax on Saturday 11 November 1933. and played at prop in Keighley's 5–18 defeat by Widnes in the 1937 Challenge Cup Final during the 1936-37 season at Wembley Stadium, London on Saturday 8 May 1937, in front of a crowd of 47,699.

=== International honours ===
Hal Jones won caps for Wales (RU) while at Neath RFC in 1929 against England, and Scotland. Jones also won three caps for Wales (RL) in 1935–1936 while at Keighley.

Harold Jones was selected for Great Britain while at Keighley for the 1936 Great Britain Lions tour of Australia and New Zealand but did not play in any of the test matches, although he did play in some of the games against representative sides.

== Honoured at Keighley ==
Harold Jones is a Keighley Cougars Hall of Fame Inductee.
