= Cyril Halliday =

England international rugby league footballer

Personal information
- Full name: Sam Cyril Halliday
- Born: 1 April 1904 Elland, Yorkshire
- Died: 4 February 1984 (aged 79) Huddersfield, Yorkshire

Playing information
- Position: Hooker
Club
Years	Team	Pld	T	G	FG	P
1923–28	Halifax
1928–35	Huddersfield	243
1935–39	Keighley	155
	Total	398	0	0	0	0
Representative
Years	Team	Pld	T	G	FG	P
	Yorkshire
1931	England	1	0	0	0	0

Sam Cyril Halliday (1 April 1904 – 4 February 1984) was an English professional rugby league footballer who played in the 1920s and 1930s. He played at representative level for England and Yorkshire, and at club level for Halifax, Huddersfield and Keighley, as a hooker.

== Background ==
Halliday was born in Elland, Yorkshire, England.

== Playing career ==
=== Challenge Cup Final appearances ===
Halliday played hooker in Huddersfield's 21–17 victory over Warrington in the 1933 Challenge Cup Final during the 1932–33 season at Wembley Stadium, London on Saturday 6 May 1933, and played hooker in Keighley's 5–18 defeat by Widnes in the 1937 Challenge Cup Final during the 1936–37 season at Wembley Stadium, London on Saturday 8 May 1937, in front of a crowd of 47,699.

=== International honours ===
Halliday won a cap for England while at Huddersfield in 1931 against Wales.

== Personal life ==
Halliday married Lucy Stott in 1923 in Halifax district. They had children; Fred Halliday (born 1924 in Halifax district), Margaret Halliday (born 1928 in Halifax). On Lucy's death, Cyril married Hetty Sykes and lived in Fartown, Huddersfield.

He died in Huddersfield, aged 79.
