= Jack Walkington =

England international rugby league footballer and coach

John Walkington
- Mark Tolson, Jack Walkington, and Les White - 1933–34 Challenge Cup Final

Personal information
- Full name: John Christopher Walkington
- Born: 3 March 1909; Kirkstall, Leeds, England
- Died: May 1997 (aged 88); Leeds, England

Playing information
- Position: Fullback
Club
Years	Team	Pld	T	G	FG	P
1927–48	Hunslet	572
1943	→Batley (guest)	2	0	3	0	6
1943	→Leeds RLFC (guest)	0	0	0	0	0
	Total	574	0	3	0	6
Representative
Years	Team	Pld	T	G	FG	P
1930–44	England	4	4	0	0	12

Coaching information
Club
Years	Team	Gms	W	D	L	W%
1946–60	Hunslet

John Christopher Walkington (3 March 1909 – May 1997) was an English rugby union, and professional rugby league footballer who played in the 1920s, 1930s and 1940s. He played club level rugby union (RU) for Burley RUFC (in Burley, Leeds), and representative level rugby league (RL) for England, and at club level for Hunslet (captain), and Batley (World War II guest), as a fullback.

== Background ==
Jack Walkington was born in Kirkstall, Leeds, West Riding of Yorkshire, England, he worked as a cabinet maker, he owned a furniture shop adjacent to the Barley Mow, Bramley, the home ground of rugby league club; Bramley, and he died aged 88 in Leeds, West Yorkshire, England.

== Playing career ==
=== Club career ===
Walkington made his début for Hunslet against Halifax on Saturday 19 March 1927, he scored 11-goals, and 1-try for 25-points against Featherstone Rovers on Wednesday 29 April 1931, and scored 119-goals in Hunslet's victory in the Yorkshire League during the 1931–32 season. During Jack Walkington's time at Hunslet, they were losing finalists in three Yorkshire Cup Finals; the 7–13 defeat by Hull Kingston Rovers in the 1929 Yorkshire Cup Final during the 1929–30 season at Headingley, Leeds on Saturday 30 November 1929, the 2–4 defeat by Huddersfield in the 1931 Yorkshire Cup Final during the 1931–32 season at Headingley, Leeds on Saturday 21 November 1931, and the 3-14 (3-12 at Parkside, Hunslet on Saturday 2 December 1944, and 0–2 at Thrum Hall, Halifax on Saturday 9 December 1944) aggregate defeat by Halifax in the 1944 Yorkshire Cup Final during the 1944–45 Wartime Emergency League season. Jack Walkington made his début for Batley against Bradford Northern at Odsal Stadium, Bradford on Saturday 6 February 1943, and he played and scored three goals in the 12–15 defeat by Wigan at Mount Pleasant, Batley on Saturday 13 February 1943.

Walkington played fullback in Hunslet FC's 7–13 defeat by Hull Kingston Rovers in the 1929–30 Yorkshire Cup Final during the 1929–30 season at Headingley, Leeds on Saturday 30 November 1929, in front of a crowd of 11,000.

Walkington played fullback, and scored a drop goal in Hunslet's 8–2 victory over Leeds in the Championship Final during the 1937–38 season at Elland Road, Leeds on Saturday 30 April 1938.

Walkington's Testimonial match at Hunslet took place against Hull Kingston Rovers on Saturday 1 January 1938.

=== International honours ===
Walkington won caps for England (RL) while at Hunslet in 1930 against Other Nationalities, in 1931 against Wales, in 1938 against Wales, and in 1944 against Wales.
