= 1945–46 Lancashire Cup =

Rugby tournament

- Structure: Regional knockout championship
- Teams: 12
- Winners: Widnes
- Runners-up: Wigan

The 1945–46 Lancashire Cup was the thirty-third occasion on which the Lancashire Cup competition had been held in rugby league, and the first since the end of the Second World War in Europe.
For the first time for several seasons there is a new name on the trophy; that of one of the founder members of the Northern Union, Widnes, who won the trophy by beating Wigan by the score of 7–3.
The match was played at Wilderspool, Warrington, (historically in the county of Lancashire). The attendance was 28,184 and receipts were £2,600.

== Background ==
The number of teams entering showed little change from before the war.
St Helens Recs had already withdrawn from the league immediately after the end on the 1938–39 season. The club had been struggling to survive for a few years with falling attendances and the economic depression and it was obviously not possible for the town to sustain two top teams.
Leigh lost its ground to in August 1940 when Callender's Cable and Construction Company bought the Mather Lane site to store drums etc as part of the war effort. The club did not resume playing until the 1946–47 season when they found a temporary ground.
Workington Town from Cumberland had joined the league.
Overall, the number of teams entering this year's competition had decreased from the pre-war total by just one and was now 12. The same pre-war fixture format was retained. This season saw no byes but two "blank" or "dummy" fixture in the first round. The second round now had two byes.
The first round of the competition was played on the basis of two legged, home and away, ties.

== Competition and results ==
=== Round 1 ===
Involved 6 matches (with two "blank" fixture) and 12 clubs

Game No	Fixture date	Home team	Score	Away team	Venue	agg	Att	Rec	Notes	Ref
1	Sat 22 Sep 1945	Barrow	18–8	Warrington	Craven Park					
2	Sat 22 Sep 1945	Oldham	7–5	Wigan	Watersheddings					
3	Sat 22 Sep 1945	Liverpool Stanley	5–5	Broughton Rangers	Stanley Greyhound Stadium					
4	Sat 22 Sep 1945	Rochdale Hornets	7–2	Swinton	Athletic Grounds					
5	Sat 22 Sep 1945	Widnes	37–0	Salford	Naughton Park					
6	Sat 22 Sep 1945	Workington Town	9–8	St. Helens	Borough Park				1	
7		blank		blank						
8		blank		blank						

=== Round 1 – second leg ===
Involved 6 matches (with two "blank" fixture) and 12 clubs. These are the reverse fixture from the first leg

Game No	Fixture date	Home team	Score	Away team	Venue	agg	Att	Rec	Notes	Ref
1	Sat 29 Sep 1945	Warrington	13–8	Barrow	Wilderspool	21–26				
2	Sat 29 Sep 1945	Wigan	19–0	Oldham	Central Park	24–7				
3	Sat 29 Sep 1945	Broughton Rangers	22–0	Liverpool Stanley	Belle Vue Stadium	27–5				
4	Sat 29 Sep 1945	Swinton	9–2	Rochdale Hornets	Station Road	11–9				
5	Sat 29 Sep 1945	Salford	2–15	Widnes	The Willows	2–52				
6	Sat 29 Sep 1945	St. Helens	21–11	Workington Town	Knowsley Road	29–20				
7		blank		blank						
8		blank		blank						

=== Round 2 – quarterfinals ===
Involved 2 matches (with two byes) and 6 clubs

Game No	Fixture date	Home team	Score	Away team	Venue	agg	Att	Rec	Notes	Ref
1	Wed 10 Oct 1945	Swinton	2–8	Wigan	Station Road					
2	Wed 10 Oct 1945	Widnes	6–0	Barrow	Naughton Park					
3		St. Helens		bye						
4		Broughton Rangers		bye						

=== Round 3 – semifinals ===
Involved 2 matches and 4 clubs

Game No	Fixture date	Home team	Score	Away team	Venue	agg	Att	Rec	Notes	Ref
1	Wed 17 Oct 1945	Wigan	18–5	St. Helens	Central Park					
2	Wed 18 Oct 1945	Widnes	10–3	Broughton Rangers	Naughton Park					

=== Final ===
Game No	Fixture date	Home team	Score	Away team	Venue	agg	Att	Rec	Notes	Ref
	Saturday 27 October 1945	Widnes	7–3	Wigan	Wilderspool		28184	£2600-0-0	2	

==== Teams and scorers ====
Widnes	№	Wigan
	teams	
Joe Bourke	1	Martin Ryan
Mick Roberts	2	Gordon Ratcliffe
Colin Hutton	3	Ernie Ashcroft
Arthur Dagnall	4	Ted Toohey
Austin Malone	5	Ted Ward
Charlie Reynolds	6	Jack Fleming
Tommy McCue (c)	7	Tommy Bradshaw
Alec Higgins	8	Ken Gee
Jack Hayes	9	Joe Egan
Hugh McDowell	10	George Banks
Robert Roberts	11	Harry Atkinson
Fred Higgins	12	Frank Barton
Harry Millington	13	Jack Blan
7	score	3
0	HT	0
	Scorers	
	Tries	
Charlie Reynolds (1)	T	Ted Toohey (1)
	Goals	
Colin Hutton (2)	G	
Referee		

Scoring – Try = three (3) points – Goal = two (2) points – Drop goal = two (2) points

=== The road to success ===
All the first round ties were played on a two leg (home and away) basis The first club named in each of the first round ties played the first leg at home the scores shown in the first round are the aggregate score over the two legs

First round
Widnes	52
Salford	2
Barrow	26
Warrington	21
Liverpool Stanley	5
Broughton Rangers	27
blank
blank
Rochdale Hornets	9
Swinton	11
Oldham	7
Wigan	24
Workington Town	20
St. Helens	29
blank
blank

Second round
Widnes	6
Barrow	0
Broughton Rangers
bye
Swinton	2
Wigan	8
St. Helens
bye

Semifinals
Widnes	10
Broughton Rangers	3
Wigan	18
St. Helens	5

Final
Widnes	7
Wigan	3

1 * The first match in the Lancashire Cup competition to be played by the new club and at this ground (of Workington AFC)
2 * Wilderspool was the home ground of Warrington from 1883 to the end of the 2003 Summer season when they moved into the new purpose built Halliwell Jones Stadium. Wilderspool remained as a sports/Ruugby League ground and is/was used by Woolston Rovers/Warrington Wizards junior club.
The ground had a final capacity of 9,000 although the record attendance was set in a Challenge cup third round match on 13 March 1948 when 34,304 spectators saw Warrington lose to Wigan 10–13.

== See also ==
- 1945–46 Northern Rugby Football League season
- Rugby league county cups
