= George Dixon (rugby league) =

English rugby league footballer

Personal information
- Full name: George Samuel Dixon
- Born: Broughton, or Salford

Playing information
- Height: 6 ft 2 in (1.88 m)
- Weight: 14 st 6 lb (92 kg)
- Position: Second-row
Club
Years	Team	Pld	T	G	FG	P
≤1929–29	Broughton Rangers
1929–33	Wigan	128	7			21
1933–≥37	Keighley
	Total	128	7	0	0	21

George Samuel Dixon, also known by the nickname of "Jumbo", was an English professional rugby league footballer who played in the 1920s and 1930s. He played at club level for Broughton Rangers, Wigan and Keighley, as a second-row.

== Playing career ==
=== Challenge Cup Final appearances ===
George Dixon played left-second-row in Keighley's 5–18 defeat by Widnes in the 1937 Challenge Cup Final during the 1936-37 season at Wembley Stadium, London on Saturday 8 May 1937, in front of a crowd of 47,699.

=== Club career ===
George Dixon made his début for Wigan, and scored a try in the 33–18 victory over Leeds at Central Park, Wigan on Saturday 7 September 1929, he scored his last try for Wigan in the 30–26 victory over Rochdale Hornets at Athletic Grounds, Rochdale on Saturday 18 March 1933, and he played his last match for Wigan in the 6–22 defeat by Warrington at Wilderspool Stadium, Warrington on Saturday 26 August 1933.
