= Len Smith (footballer, born 1913) =

Australian rules footballer, born 1913

Personal information
- Full name: Len Smith
- Born: 4 May 1913
- Died: 11 October 1972 (aged 59)
- Original team: Blenheim
- Height: 170 cm (5 ft 7 in)
- Weight: 70 kg (154 lb)

Playing career^{1}
Years	Club	Games (Goals)
1936–37	North Melbourne	13 (4)
- ^{1} Playing statistics correct to the end of 1937.

Len Smith (4 May 1913 – 11 October 1972) was an Australian rules footballer who played with North Melbourne in the Victorian Football League (VFL).
