= Len Smith (footballer, born 1882) =

Australian rules footballer and cricketer

Personal information
- Full name: Leonard Angus Smith
- Born: 25 October 1882; North Melbourne, Victoria
- Died: 29 July 1943 (aged 60); Heidelberg, Victoria
- Original team: Blenheim

Playing career^{1}
Years	Club	Games (Goals)
1902	South Melbourne	1 (0)
- ^{1} Playing statistics correct to the end of 1902.

Leonard Angus Smith (25 October 1882 – 29 July 1943) was an Australian rules footballer who played with South Melbourne in the Victorian Football League (VFL). He also played two first-class cricket matches for Victoria in 1908.

== See also ==
- List of Victoria first-class cricketers
