= Bill Hopkin =

Wales international rugby union & league player (1914-2002)

William Henry Hopkin
Personal information
- Full name: William Henry Hopkin
- Born: 1 July 1914; Newport, Wales
- Died: 3 March 2002 (aged 87); Newport, Wales

Playing information

Rugby union
- Position: Wing
Club
Years	Team	Pld	T	G	FG	P
	Chepstow RFC
	Gloucester RFC
1935–38	Newport RFC	68	26			78
	Total	68	26	0	0	78
Representative
Years	Team	Pld	T	G	FG	P
1937	Wales	1	0	0	0	0

Rugby league
- Position: Wing
Club
Years	Team	Pld	T	G	FG	P
1938–46	Swinton	59	28	0	0	84

William Henry Hopkin (1 July 1914 – 3 March 2002) was a Welsh rugby union, and professional rugby league footballer who played in the 1930s and 1940s.

Hopkin was born in Newport, he played representative level rugby union (RU) for Wales, and at club level for Chepstow RFC, Gloucester RFC and Newport RFC, as a Wing, played club level rugby league (RL) for Swinton, and played association football (soccer) with Newport County reserves. He died in Newport aged 87.

== International honours ==
Bill Hopkin won a cap for Wales (RU) while at Newport RFC in 1937 against Scotland.
