= Auguste Burdeau =

French politician (1851–1894)

Auguste-Laurent Burdeau
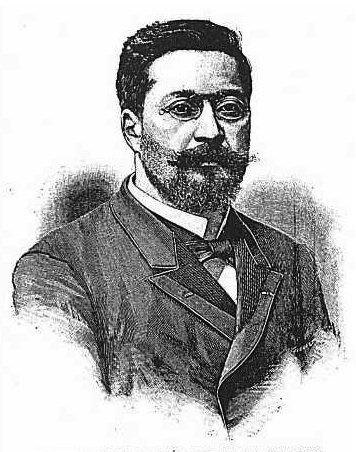
- Auguste-Laurent Burdeau
- Born: 10 September 1851; Lyon, France
- Died: 12 December 1894 (aged 43)
- Occupation: politician

Auguste-Laurent Burdeau (French pronunciation: [oɡyst lɔʁɑ̃ byʁdo]; 10 September 1851 – 12 December 1894) was a French politician.

He was the son of a laborer at Lyon. Forced from childhood to earn his own living, he was enabled to secure an education by bursarships at the Lycée at Lyon and at the Lycée Louis-le-Grand in Paris.

In 1870 he was at the École Normale Supérieure in Paris, but enlisted in the army, and was wounded and taken prisoner in 1871 (during the Franco-Prussian War). In 1874 he became professor of philosophy, and translated several works of Herbert Spencer and of Schopenhauer into French. He was author of a moral instruction text book used in Saint-Sauveur-en-Puisaye.

His extraordinary aptitude for work secured for him the position of chef de cabinet under Paul Bert, the minister of education, in 1880s. In 1885 he was elected deputy for the département of the Rhône, and distinguished himself in financial questions. In 1887, he served as rapporteur for the education budget, and he was the general rapporteur for the budget in 1889. He was several times minister : following the dismissal of Godefroy Cavaignac on July 13, 1892, he was appointed Minister of the Navy and the Colonies in the Loubet cabinet, a position he held till Jan. 11th, 1893, although he was already a suspect in the Panama scandals, and charged for corruption by Drumont in his journal la Libre Parole. He became minister of finance in the cabinet of Casimir-Perier (from 3 November 1893 to 22 May 1894). On 5 July 1894 he was elected president of the chamber of deputies. He died on 12 December 1894, supposedly worn out with overwork. He considered hard work a fundamental ingredient of civilization.

== French policy on Algeria ==
The budget report presented to the Chamber of Deputies on 4 December 1891 by Auguste Burdeau was one of the major events in French policy discussions on Algeria. During his two-hour speech, he provided a more general analysis of French policy in Algeria. He feared bringing colonial subjects into contact with imperial culture and refused to allow them full participation in that culture. Burdeau's examination of problems of indigenous people within French nation helped to shape French policy on Algeria.

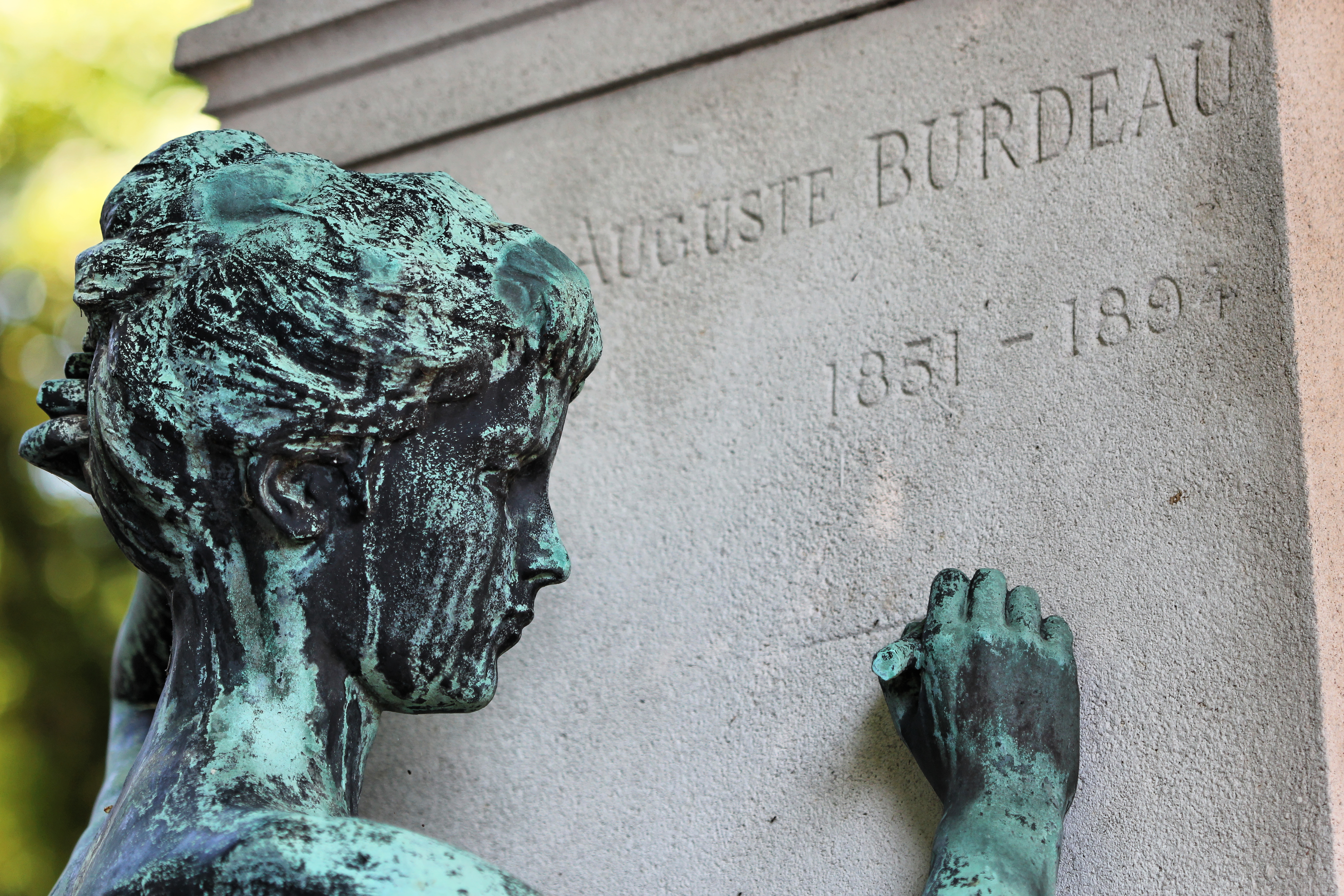
Grave at Père Lachaise Cemetery.
