= Colin Stansfield =

England international rugby league footballer

Personal information
- Full name: Colin Stansfield

Playing information
- Position: Second-row
Club
Years	Team	Pld	T	G	FG	P
1935–47	Hunslet	175	13	0	0	39
Representative
Years	Team	Pld	T	G	FG	P
1945	England	1	0	0	0	0

Colin Stansfield is an English former professional rugby league footballer who played in the 1940s. He played at representative level for England, and at club level for Hunslet, as a second-row.

== Playing career ==
=== Championship final appearances ===
Colin Stansfield played at second-row in Hunslet's 8-2 victory over Leeds in the Championship Final during the 1937–38 season at Elland Road, Leeds on Saturday 30 April 1938.

=== International honours ===
Colin Stansfield won a cap for England while at Hunslet in 1945 against Wales.
