= Frank Watson (rugby league) =

English rugby league footballer and coach

Personal information
- Full name: Frank Watson
- Born: 6 January 1923; Hunslet, England
- Died: 30 August 2016 (aged 93); Morley, England

Playing information
- Height: 5 ft 8 in (1.73 m)
- Weight: 10 st 10 lb (68 kg)
- Position: Scrum-half
Club
Years	Team	Pld	T	G	FG	P
1940–49	Hunslet	246	57	0	1	173
1942/43	→ York (guest)
1949–57	Leeds	122	18	1	0	56
1957–59	Batley
	Total	368	75	1	1	229
Representative
Years	Team	Pld	T	G	FG	P
≥1940–≤49	Yorkshire

Coaching information
Club
Years	Team	Gms	W	D	L	W%
1958–62	Batley

Frank Watson (6 January 1923 – 30 August 2016), also known by the nickname of "Shanks", was an English professional rugby league footballer who played in the 1940s and 1950s, and coached in the 1950s and 1960s. He played at representative level for Yorkshire, and at club level for Hunslet, York (World War II guest), Leeds, and Batley, as a centre or scrum-half. and coached at club level for Leeds (A-Team), and Batley.

== Background ==
Watson was born in Hunslet, West Riding of Yorkshire, England, he worked as a bus conductor, and he died aged 93 in the Alexander Care Home, Victoria Road, Morley, West Yorkshire, England.

== Playing career ==
Watson represented Yorkshire while at Hunslet. He played in Hunslet's 18-10 victory over New Zealand during the 1947–48 New Zealand rugby tour of Great Britain and France match at Parkside, Hunslet during October 1947. Watson appeared in a Great Britain trial match in advance of the 1946 Great Britain Lions tour while at Hunslet, but ultimately he was not selected for the tour, he made his début for Leeds in the 21-13 victory over Hunslet at Parkside, Hunslet on Saturday 1 October 1949, he broke right-ankle in 1951, he played his last game for the Leeds on Saturday 8 October 1955.

== Coaching career ==
Watson was the player-coach of Leeds' A-Team that included the future 'This Sporting Life' author David Storey, and was the coach of Batley from June 1958 to June 1962.

== Personal life ==
He was married to Lilian (née Duffy).
