= Harry Owen (rugby league, Widnes) =

English rugby league footballer

Personal information
- Born: first ¼ 1907 Prescot, Lancashire, England
- Died: first ¼ 1966 (aged 73) Prescot, Lancashire, England

Playing information
- Height: 5 ft 6.5 in (1.689 m)
- Weight: 10 st 0 lb (64 kg)
- Position: Wing
Club
Years	Team	Pld	T	G	FG	P
1928–40	Widnes	228	74	4	0	230
- Relatives: Ray Owen (son)

Harry Owen (first ¼ 1907 – first ¼ 1966), also known by the nickname of "Ginger", was a professional rugby league footballer who played in the 1920s, 1930s and 1940s. He played at club level for Widnes, as a wing.

== Background ==
Harry Owen's birth was registered in Prescot district, Lancashire, he worked in the chemical industry, and his death aged 73 was registered in Prescot district, Lancashire, England.

== Playing career ==
=== Challenge Cup Final appearances ===
Harry Owen played on the wing in Widnes' 10–3 victory over St. Helens in the 1929–30 Challenge Cup Final during the 1929–30 season at Wembley Stadium, London in front of a crowd of 36,544, and played on the wing in the 5–11 defeat by Hunslet in the 1933–34 Challenge Cup Final during the 1933–34 season at Wembley Stadium, London in front of a crowd of 41,280.

=== Club career ===
Harry Owen signed for Widnes on 18 August 1927, he initially played in the A-Team for three-years, he made his first-team début, and scored a try in Widnes' 3–0 victory over St. Helens during the 1929–30 season at Knowsley Road, St. Helens on Saturday 31 August 1929.

== Outside of rugby league ==
Harry Owen was a pupil and played rugby league for Widnes Church of England School, and played for Widnes Schoolboys when they won the Championship Cup two years in succession.

== Genealogical information ==
Harry Owen's marriage to Margaret (née Leather, birth registered during third ¼ 1912 in Prescot district) was registered during second ¼ 1932 in Prescot district. They had children; the future rugby league footballer who played in the 1950s and 1960s for Widnes, and Liverpool City, Harry Owen Jr. (birth registered during fourth ¼ 1932 in Prescot district), the future rugby league footballer, Ray Owen, Christine Owen (birth registered during first ¼ 1943 (age 81–82) in Prescot district), and David Owen (birth registered during second ¼ 1945 (age 79–80) in Prescot district).
