= Tommy McCue =

Former GB & England international rugby league footballer

Personal information
- Full name: Thomas McCue
- Born: 23 September 1913 Widnes, England
- Died: 19 April 1994 (aged 80) Cornwall, Ontario, Canada

Playing information
- Height: 5 ft 8 in (1.73 m)
- Weight: 13 st 0 lb (83 kg)
- Position: Scrum-half
Club
| Years | Team | Pld | T | G | FG | P |
|---|---|---|---|---|---|---|
| 1931–49 | Widnes | 339 | 106 | 2 | 0 | 322 |
| 1940–44 | → Oldham (guest) | 5 | 1 | 0 | 0 | 3 |
| 1940 | → Warrington (guest) | 1 | 2 | 0 | 0 | 6 |
| 1941 | → Halifax (guest) | 1 |
| 194? | → Castleford (guest) | 1 |
| 1944 | → St Helens (guest) | 1 | 0 | 0 | 0 | 0 |
| | Total | 348 | 109 | 2 | 0 | 331 |
Representative
| Years | Team | Pld | T | G | FG | P |
| ≤1937–≥37 | Lancashire | ≥1 |
| 1935–46 | England | 11 | 0 | 0 | 0 | 0 |
| 1936–46 | Great Britain | 6 | 0 | 0 | 0 | 0 |
| 194? | Rugby League XIII | 0 | 0 | 0 | 0 | 0 |

Thomas McCue (23 September 1913 – 19 April 1994) was an English professional rugby league footballer who played in the 1930s and 1940s. He played at representative level for Great Britain (vice-captain 1946 Great Britain Lions tour), England and Lancashire, and at club level for Widnes as a scrum-half. During World War II, he also appeared as a wartime guest player for Oldham, Warrington, Halifax, Castleford and St Helens.

== Background ==
Tommy McCue was born in Widnes, Lancashire (birth registered in Prescot, Lancashire), and he died aged 80 in Cornwall, Ontario, Canada.

== Playing career ==
=== Challenge Cup Final appearances ===
McCue played scrum-half in Widnes' 5-11 defeat by Hunslet in the 1933–34 Challenge Cup Final during the 1933–34 season at Wembley Stadium, London on Saturday 5 May 1934, played scrum-half in the 18-5 victory over Keighley in the 1936–37 Challenge Cup Final during the 1936–37 season at Wembley Stadium, London on Saturday 8 May 1937, and played scrum-half in Halifax's 2-9 defeat by Leeds in the 1940–41 Challenge Cup Final during the 1940–41 season at Odsal, Bradford, in front of a crowd of 28,500.

=== County Cup Final appearances ===
McCue played scrum-half in Widnes' 4-5 defeat by Swinton in the 1939–40 Lancashire Cup Final first-leg during the 1939–40 season at Naughton Park, Widnes on Saturday 20 April 1940, and played scrum-half in the 11-16 defeat (15-21 aggregate defeat) by Swinton in the 1939–40 Lancashire Cup Final second-leg during the 1939–40 season at Station Road, Swinton on Saturday 27 April 1940, and played scrum-half, and was captain in Widnes' 7-3 victory over Wigan in the 1945–46 Lancashire Cup Final during the 1945–46 season at Wilderspool Stadium, Warrington on Saturday 27 October 1945.

=== Club career ===
McCue made his début for Warrington on Saturday 23 November 1940, this was as a World War II guest, and this was his only appearance for Warrington.

=== Representative honours ===
McCue won caps for England while at Widnes in 1935 against France, and Wales, in 1936 against France, in 1937 against France, in 1938 against Wales (2 matches), and France, in 1940 against Wales, in 1945 against Wales, in 1946 against France, and Wales, and won caps for Great Britain while at Widnes in 1936 against Australia, in 1937 against Australia, and in 1946 against Australia (3 matches), and New Zealand.

McCue played scrum-half in Lancashire's 7-5 victory over Australia in the 1937–38 Kangaroo tour match at Wilderspool Stadium, Warrington on Wednesday 29 September 1937, in front of a crowd of 16,250.

== Honoured at Widnes ==
Tommy McCue is a Widnes Hall Of Fame Inductee.
