= Len Smith (rugby league) =

England international rugby league footballer

Personal information
- Full name: Leonard Smith
- Born: 29 January 1911 Leeds, England
- Died: 14 June 2000 (aged 89) Halifax, England

Playing information
- Position: Prop
Club
Years	Team	Pld	T	G	FG	P
1929–35	Hunslet	165	31	0	0	93
Representative
Years	Team	Pld	T	G	FG	P
1931	Yorkshire	2	0	0	0	0
1935	England	1	2	0	0	6

Leonard Smith (29 January 1911 – 14 June 2000) was an English professional rugby league footballer who played in the 1930s. He played at representative level for England, and at club level for Hunslet, as a prop or hooker.

== Background ==
Len Smith was born in Leeds, West Riding of Yorkshire, England, and he died aged 89 in Halifax, West Yorkshire, England.

== Playing career ==
=== Club career ===
Smith played prop, and scored a try in Hunslet's 11-5 victory over Widnes in the 1933–34 Challenge Cup Final during the 1933–34 season at Wembley Stadium, London on Saturday 5 May 1934.

=== International honours ===
While at Hunslet, Smith played hooker, and scored 2 tries in England's 15-15 draw with France at Stade de Paris on Thursday 28 March 1935 in front of a 20,000 crowd. This was also Smith's final game as a rugby league player, as he quit the sport to take up employment with the Halifax Police Force.
