= Leonard A. Smith =

American politician

Member of the New Hampshire House of Representatives from the Hillsborough 14th district
- In office 1972–1982

Member of the New Hampshire House of Representatives from the Hillsborough 19th district
- In office 1982–1984

Member of the New Hampshire House of Representatives from the Hillsborough 21st district
- In office 1984–1992

Member of the New Hampshire House of Representatives from the Hillsborough 25th district
- In office 1992–1994

Personal details
- Born: July 5, 1915
- Died: November 10, 2002 (aged 87)
- Party: Republican

Leonard A. Smith (July 5, 1915 – November 10, 2002) was an American politician. He served as a Republican member of the New Hampshire House of Representatives.

== Life and career ==
Smith served in the Army Corps of Engineers during World War II. He was a contractor and builder.

Smith served in the New Hampshire House of Representatives from 1972 to 1994.

Smith died on November 10, 2002, at the age of 87.
