= Billy Thornton (rugby league) =

England rugby league footballer

Personal information
- Full name: William S. Thornton
- Born: unknown
- Died: unknown

Playing information
- Position: Scrum-half
Club
Years	Team	Pld	T	G	FG	P
1928–46	Hunslet	431	106	25	0	368
Representative
Years	Team	Pld	T	G	FG	P
1943	England	1	0	0	0	0

William Thornton (birth unknown – death unknown) was an English professional rugby league footballer who played in the 1930s and 1940s. He played at representative level for England, and at club level for Hunslet, as a scrum-half.

== Playing career ==
=== Championship final appearances ===
Billy Thornton played scrum-half in Hunslet's 8-2 victory over Leeds in the Championship Final during the 1937–38 season at Elland Road, Leeds on Saturday 30 April 1938.

=== County Cup Final appearances ===
Billy Thornton played scrum-half in Hunslet FC's 7-13 defeat by Hull Kingston Rovers in the 1929–30 Yorkshire Cup Final during the 1929–30 season at Headingley, Leeds on Saturday 30 November 1929, in front of a crowd of 11,000.

=== International honours ===
Billy Thornton won a cap for England while at Hunslet in 1943 against Wales.
