= Harry Dale (rugby league) =

English rugby league footballer

Personal information
- Full name: Harry Dale
- Born: February 1908; Kingston upon Hull, England
- Died: 15 November 1970 (aged 62)

Playing information
- Position: Stand-off, Scrum-half
Club
Years	Team	Pld	T	G	FG	P
1926–38	Hull Kingston Rovers	305	88	11	0	286
1938–≥38	Newcastle RLFC
	Total	305	88	11	0	286
Representative
Years	Team	Pld	T	G	FG	P
1930–35	Yorkshire	5	1	0	0	3

Harry Dale (February 1908 – 15 November 1970), also known by the nicknames of "Squibber" (at school due to his short height) and later "Scrubber" (following a mishearing and misprinting of "Squibber"), was an English professional rugby league footballer who played in the 1920s and 1930s. He played at representative level for Yorkshire, and at club level for Newtown ARLFC (in Kingston upon Hull) (some sources incorrectly state Strickland ARLFC), Hull Kingston Rovers and Newcastle RLFC, as a stand-off or scrum-half.

== Background ==
Harry Dale was born in Kingston upon Hull, East Riding of Yorkshire, England, he was a pupil at Buckingham Street School (now Buckingham Primary Academy), Kingston upon Hull, he worked as a stevedore at the Port of Hull, he sustained a serious head injury while working with a Royal Engineers bomb disposal unit during World War II, he experienced ill-health in later life and following several spells in hospital, he died aged 61–62 in Kingston upon Hull, East Riding of Yorkshire, England.

== Playing career ==
=== Club career ===
Dale transferred from Newtown ARLFC to Hull Kingston Rovers. He made his début for Hull Kingston Rovers, playing at stand-off against Hunslet F.C. at Parkside, Hunslet on Saturday 27 March 1926. He played his last match for Hull Kingston Rovers, and scored a try against Leigh at Mather Lane (adjacent to the Bridgewater Canal), Leigh on Saturday 3 September 1938, and he transferred from Hull Kingston Rovers to Newcastle RLFC.

Dale played stand-off and scored a try in Hull Kingston Rovers' 13–7 victory over Hunslet F.C. in the 1929–30 Yorkshire Cup Final during the 1929–30 season at Headingley, Leeds on Saturday 30 November 1929, in front of a crowd of 11,000.

A joint benefit season/testimonial match at Hull Kingston Rovers against Bramley during the 1937–38 season was shared by; Harry Dale and Jack Spamer, during April 1938 each player received £84 (based on increases in average earnings, this would be approximately £14,030 in 2018).

=== Representative honours ===
Dale was selected to play against Australia during the 1933–34 Kangaroo tour of Great Britain, but he had to withdraw due to a knee injury.

Dale made five appearances for Yorkshire while at Hull Kingston Rovers.
