= Hector Crowther =

GB & England international rugby league footballer

Herbert (Hector) Crowther
- Ogden's Cigarette card featuring Crowther

Personal information
- Full name: Hector H. Crowther
- Born: 26 March 1901
- Died: 3 February 1989 (aged 87)

Playing information
- Position: Second-row
Club
Years	Team	Pld	T	G	FG	P
1919–34	Hunslet	464	105	15	0	345
Representative
Years	Team	Pld	T	G	FG	P
1923–31	Yorkshire	17	3	0	0	9
1930	England	1	0	0	0	0
1930	Great Britain	1	0	0	0	0

Herbert (Hector) Crowther (26 March 1901 – 3 February 1989) was an English professional rugby league footballer who played in the 1920s and 1930s. He played at representative level for Great Britain, England and Yorkshire, and at club level for Hunslet, as a second-row.

== Playing career ==
=== County Cup Final appearances ===
Herbert Crowther played at second-row in Hunslet FC's 7-13 defeat by Hull Kingston Rovers in the 1929–30 Yorkshire Cup Final during the 1929–30 season at Headingley, Leeds on Saturday 30 November 1929, in front of a crowd of 11,000.

=== International honours ===
Herbert Crowther a won cap for England while at Hunslet in 1930 against Other Nationalities, and a won cap for England while at Hunslet in 1930 against Australia.
