= Leonard V. Smith =

American historian (born 1957)

- Born: December 8, 1957 (age 68)
- Education: Oberlin College; Columbia University
- Occupation: Military historian

Leonard V. Smith (born December 8, 1957) is an American military historian.

Smith graduated from Oberlin College in 1980 with a bachelor's degree, completed his master's degree at Columbia University's School of International Affairs in 1982, and obtained a doctorate at Columbia University in 1990. He is the Frederick B. Artz Professor of History at Oberlin.

== Selected publications ==
- Smith, Leonard V. (2018). Sovereignty at the Paris Peace Conference of 1919. Oxford University Press. ISBN 9780199677177.
- Smith, Leonard V. (2007). The Embattled Self. Cornell University Press. ISBN 9780801445231.
- Smith, Leonard V.; Becker, Annette; Audoin-Rouzeau, Stéphane (2003). France and the Great War. Cambridge University Press. ISBN 9780521666312.
- Smith, Leonard V. (1994). Between Mutiny and Obedience: The Case of the French Fifth Infantry Division During World War I. Princeton University Press. ISBN 9780691033044.
