= Harry Millington (rugby league) =

England international rugby league footballer (born 1908)

Personal information
- Full name: Harry Millington
- Born: 28 May 1908 unknown
- Died: unknown

Playing information
- Position: Second-row, Loose forward
Club
Years	Team	Pld	T	G	FG	P
1927–47	Widnes	460	65	0	0	195
1940–41	→ Oldham (guest)	4	0	0	0	0
1941–42	→ Halifax (guest)	2
	Total	466	65	0	0	195
Representative
Years	Team	Pld	T	G	FG	P
1937–37	Lancashire	1
1944	England	1	0	0	0	0

Harry Millington, was an English professional rugby league footballer who played in the 1920s, 1930s and 1940s. He played at representative level for England and Lancashire, and at club level for Widnes, Halifax (World War II guest) and Oldham RLFC (World War II guest), as a second-row or loose forward.

== Playing career ==
=== International honours ===
Harry Millington won a cap for England while at Widnes in 1944 against Wales.

=== County honours ===
Harry Millington played loose forward in Lancashire's 7-5 victory over Australia in the 1937–38 Kangaroo tour match at Wilderspool Stadium, Warrington on Wednesday 29 September 1937, in front of a crowd of 16,250.

=== Challenge Cup Final appearances ===
Harry Millington played loose forward in Widnes' 10-3 victory over St. Helens in the 1929–30 Challenge Cup Final during the 1929–30 season at Wembley Stadium, London on Saturday 3 May 1930 in front of a crowd of 36,544, played loose forward in the 5-11 defeat by Hunslet in the 1933–34 Challenge Cup Final during the 1933–34 season at Wembley Stadium, London on Saturday 5 May 1934, and played loose forward in the 18-5 victory over Keighley in the 1936–37 Challenge Cup Final at Wembley Stadium, London on Saturday 8 May 1937.

=== County Cup Final appearances ===
Harry Millington played loose forward in Widnes' 7-3 victory over Wigan in the 1945–46 Lancashire Cup Final during the 1945–46 season at Wilderspool Stadium, Warrington on Saturday 27 October 1945.

== Honoured at Widnes ==
Harry Millington is a Widnes Hall Of Fame Inductee.
