= George Todd (rugby league) =

England international rugby league footballer

Personal information
- Full name: George Todd
- Born: 8 August 1910
- Died: unknown

Playing information
- Position: Stand-off
Club
Years	Team	Pld	T	G	FG	P
1928–36	Hunslet	285	143	18	0	465
1936–46	Halifax	287	76	1	0	230
	→ Huddersfield (guest)
1946–47	Hunslet	11	1	0	0	3
	Total	583	220	19	0	698
Representative
Years	Team	Pld	T	G	FG	P
1935–36	England	3	1	0	0	3

George Todd (8 August 1910 – death unknown) was an English professional rugby league footballer who played in the 1930s. He played at representative level for England, and at club level for Hunslet, Halifax and Huddersfield (World War II guest), as a stand-off.

== Playing career ==
=== Hunslet ===
George Todd played stand-off in Hunslet FC's 7–13 defeat by Hull Kingston Rovers in the 1929–30 Yorkshire Cup Final during the 1929–30 season at Headingley, Leeds on Saturday 30 November 1929, in front of a crowd of 11,000.

=== Halifax ===
George Todd played stand-off in Halifax's 2–9 defeat by Leeds in the 1940–41 Challenge Cup Final during the 1940–41 season at Odsal, Bradford, in front of a crowd of 28,500.

=== International honours ===
George Todd won caps for England while at Hunslet in 1935 against France, and Wales, and in 1936 against Wales.
