= Hugh McDowell (rugby league) =

England international rugby league footballer

Personal information
- Full name: Hugh McDowell
- Born: 17 November 1907
- Died: March 1972 (aged 64)

Playing information
- Position: Second-row, Prop
Club
Years	Team	Pld	T	G	FG	P
1930–46	Widnes	314	36	14	0	136
1940(guest)	→ Oldham RLFC	9	0	1	0	2
1941(guest)	→ St Helens	19	1	0	0	3
	Total	342	37	15	0	141
Representative
Years	Team	Pld	T	G	FG	P
1939	England	1	0	0	0	0

Hugh McDowell (17 November 1907 – March 1972) was an English professional rugby league footballer who played in the 1930s and 1940s. He played at representative level for England, and at club level for Widnes, as a prop or second-row.

== Playing career ==
=== County Cup Final appearances ===
McDowell played at second-row in Widnes' 4–5 defeat by Swinton in the 1939–40 Lancashire Cup Final first-leg during the 1939–40 season at Naughton Park, Widnes on Saturday 20 April 1940, and played at second-row in the 11–16 defeat (15–21 aggregate defeat) by Swinton in the 1939–40 Lancashire Cup Final second-leg during the 1939–40 season at Station Road, Swinton on Saturday 27 April 1940, and played at prop in Widnes' 7–3 victory over Wigan in the 1945–46 Lancashire Cup Final during the 1945–46 season at Wilderspool Stadium, Warrington on Saturday 27 October 1945.

=== International honours ===
McDowell won a cap for England while at Widnes in 1939 against France.
