= 1940–41 Yorkshire Cup =

- Structure: Regional knockout championship
- Teams: 16
- Winners: Bradford Northern
- Runners-up: Dewsbury

The 1940–41 Yorkshire Cup was held in spring 1941.

The Yorkshire Cup competition was a knock-out competition between (mainly professional) rugby league clubs from the county of Yorkshire. The actual area was at times increased to encompass other teams from outside the county such as Newcastle, Mansfield, Coventry, and even London (in the form of Acton & Willesden). The competition always took place early in the season, in the Autumn, with the final taking place in (or just before) December. The only exception to this was when disruption of the fixture list was caused during, and immediately after, the two World Wars.

The Second World War was continuing and the Yorkshire Cup was moved to the end of the 1940–41 Northern Rugby Football League Wartime Emergency League season.

1940–41 was the thirty-third occasion on which the Yorkshire Cup competition had been held. This season's competition is classed as a "Wartime Emergency Competition" and therefore the results did not count as an official competition win. However, this aside and for the second consecutive competition, there was a new winner for this season's trophy, Bradford Northern winning the trophy by beating Dewsbury by the score of 15–5. The match was played at Fartown, Huddersfield, now in West Yorkshire. The attendance was 13,316 and receipts were £939.

== Change in Club participation ==
Hull Kingston Rovers – The club dropped out of the wartime Lancashire league after the ‘first (1939–40) season. They did not return to league competition until 1945–46 peacetime season.

Wigan - This club entered the Yorkshire Cup competition.

Oldham - The club, as Wigan, also entered the Yorkshire Cup competition.

Batley, Bramley and Keighley all rejoined the competition after appearing to withdraw from last season's competition.

Dewsbury - had a relatively successful time during the war years. Managed by Eddie Waring, and with the side boosted by the inclusion of a number of big-name guest players, the club won the Wartime Emergency League in 1941–42 and again the following season 1942–43 (though that championship was declared null and void when it was discovered they had played an ineligible player). They were also runners-up in the Championship in 1943–44, Challenge Cup winners in 1943 and Yorkshire Cup final appearances in this season 1940–41 and winners in 1942–43.

== Background ==
This season there were no junior/amateur clubs taking part, but with the addition of the two Lancashire clubs, Wigan and Oldham, the total number of entrants increased by four to the total of sixteen.

This in turn resulted in no byes in the first round.

== Competition and results ==
=== Round 1 ===
Involved 8 matches (with no byes) and 16 clubs

Game No	Fixture date	Home team	Score	Away team	Venue	Ref
1	Sat 15 Mar 1941	Bradford Northern	28–10	Bramley	Odsal	
2	Sat 15 Mar 1941	Dewsbury	17–5	Hunslet	Crown Flatt	
3	Sat 15 Mar 1941	Featherstone Rovers	14–0	Keighley	Post Office Road	
4	Sat 15 Mar 1941	Halifax	6–13	Castleford	Thrum Hall	
5	Sat 15 Mar 1941	Huddersfield	35–3	Batley	Fartown	
6	Sat 15 Mar 1941	Hull	15–22	York	Boulevard	
7	Sat 15 Mar 1941	Wakefield Trinity	17–5	Oldham (Note: This was the first Yorkshire Cup match to be played by Oldham)	Belle Vue	
8	Sat 15 Mar 1941	Wigan (Note: This was the first Yorkshire Cup match to be played by Wigan and the first at Central Park)	3–9	Leeds	Central Park	

=== Round 2 - quarterfinals ===
Involved 4 matches and 8 clubs

Game No	Fixture date	Home team	Score	Away team	Venue	Ref
1	Sat 22 Mar 1941	Bradford Northern	18–5	Wakefield Trinity	Odsal	
2	Sat 22 Mar 1941	Dewsbury	21–5	York	Crown Flatt	
3	Sat 22 Mar 1941	Featherstone Rovers	20–9	Leeds	Post Office Road	
4	Sat 22 Mar 1941	Huddersfield	8–3	Castleford	Fartown	

=== Round 3 – semifinals ===
Involved 2 matches and 4 clubs

Game No	Fixture date	Home team	Score	Away team	Venue	Ref
1	Sat 29 Mar 1941	Dewsbury	20–2	Featherstone Rovers	Crown Flatt	
2	Sat 29 Mar 1941	Huddersfield	0–2	Bradford Northern	Fartown	

=== Final ===
Fixture date	Home team	Score	Away team	Venue	Att	Rec	Notes	Ref
Saturday 5 April 1941	Bradford Northern	15–5	Dewsbury	Fartown	13,316	£939	(Note: Fartown was the home ground of Huddersfield from 1878 to the end of the 1991-92 season to Huddersfield Town FC's Leeds Road stadium, and then to the McAlpine Stadium in 1994. Fartown remained as a sports/Rugby League ground but is now rather dilapidated, and is only used for staging amateur rugby league games.)	

==== Teams and scorers ====
Bradford Northern	No.	Dewsbury
	Teams	
George Carmichael	1	Jim Sullivan (Note: Guest player from Wigan)
Walter Best	2	Harry Germaine
Tom Winnard	3	Jack Waring (Note: Guest player from St Helens)
Ernest Ward	4	Tom Kenny (Note: Guest player from Salford)
Emlyn Walters	5	Peter Barnes (Note: Guest player from Swinton)
Gus Risman	6	Frank Tracey
Donald Ward	7	Harry Royal
Frank Whitcombe	8	Hector Thomas (Note: Guest player from Broughton Rangers)
Cliff Carter	9	Glyn Jones
Leonard Higson	10	Shirley Crabtree
William Smith	11	Les Garner
Trevor Foster	12	George Kershaw
Jack Moore	13	Jack Bradbury
Dai Rees	Coach	Eddie Waring
15	score	5
6	HT	5
	Scorers	
	Tries	
	T	
	T	
	T	
	Goals	
	G	
	G	
	Drop Goals	
	DG	
Referee		G. S. Phillips (Widnes)

Scoring - Try = three (3) points - Goal = two (2) points - Drop goal = two (2) points

=== The road to success ===
First round
Huddersfield	35
Batley	3
Halifax	6
Castleford	13
Bradford Northern	28
Bramley	10
Wakefield Trinity	17
Oldham	5
Dewsbury	17
Hunslet	5
Hull	15
York	22
Featherstone Rovers	14
Keighley	0
Wigan	3
Leeds	9

Second round
Huddersfield	8
Castleford	3
Bradford Northern	18
Wakefield Trinity	5
Dewsbury	21
York	5
Featherstone Rovers	20
Leeds	9

Semifinals
Huddersfield	0
Bradford Northern	2
Dewsbury	20
Featherstone Rovers	2

Final
Bradford Northern	15
Dewsbury	5

== See also ==
- 1940–41 Northern Rugby Football League Wartime Emergency League season
- Rugby league county cups
