= 1943–44 Yorkshire Cup =

Rugby league county cup competition

- Structure: Regional knockout championship
- Teams: 16
- Winners: Bradford Northern
- Runners-up: Keighley

The 1943–44 Yorkshire Cup competition was the thirty-sixth occasion on which the Yorkshire Cup competition had been held.

It was a knock-out competition between (mainly professional) rugby league clubs from the county of Yorkshire. The actual area was at times increased to encompass other teams from outside the county such as Newcastle, Mansfield, Coventry, and even London (in the form of Acton & Willesden. The competition always took place early in the season, in the Autumn, with the final taking place in (or just before) December (The only exception to this was when disruption of the fixture list was caused during, and immediately after, the two World Wars)

The Second World War was continuing and the Yorkshire Cup remained in the early part of the 1943–44 Northern Rugby Football League Wartime Emergency League season

Bradford Northern won the trophy by beating Keighley over two legs by an aggregate score of 10–7

Bradford Northern played the first leg match at home (at Odsal) and won 5–2. The attendance was 10,251 and receipts were £757.

Keighley were at home (at Lawkholme Lane) for the second leg match and drew 5–5. The attendance at the second leg match was 8,993 and receipts £634.

== Change in club participation ==
Hull Kingston Rovers – The club dropped out of the wartime Lancashire league after the ‘first (1939–40) season. They did not return to league competition until 1945–46 peacetime season.

Bramley withdrew after the third wartime season (1941–42) had finished and did not rejoin until the 1945–46 season.

Castleford withdrew after the third wartime season (1941–42) had finished and did not participate for two seasons, re-joining for the 1944–45 season.

Hunslet withdrew after the third wartime season (1941–42) had finished and did not participate for one season, and re-joined in time for this season.

Wigan – This club entered the Yorkshire Cup competition for the fourth successive season

Oldham – The club, as Wigan, also entered the Yorkshire Cup competition and for the fourth successive season

St. Helens – The club, as Wigan and Oldham}, also entered the Yorkshire Cup competition and for their second successive season

Barrow – withdrew after the end of the first (1939–40) season finished and did not rejoin the league, including the Yorkshire Cup until this season.

Dewsbury had a relatively successful time during the war years. Managed by Eddie Waring, and with the side boosted by the inclusion of a number of big-name guest players, the club won the Wartime Emergency League in 1941–42 and again the following season 1942–43 (though that championship was declared null and void when it was discovered they had played an ineligible player). They were also runners-up in the Championship in 1943–44, Challenge Cup winners in 1943 and Yorkshire Cup final appearances in this season 1940–41 and winners in 1942–43.

== Background ==
This season there were no junior/amateur clubs taking part, Hunslet rejoined after one season's absence, and with Barrow adding to the previous Lancashire presence of Wigan, Oldham and St. Helens, this increased the entries by two, bringing the total up to sixteen.

This in turn resulted in no byes in the first round.

For the third successive year, ALL the ties (this season including the actual final) were played on a two-legged home and away basis.

== Competition and results ==
=== Round 1 - First leg ===
Involved 8 matches (with no byes) and 16 clubs

All first round ties are played on a two-legged home and away basis

Game No	Fixture date	Home team	Score	Away team	Venue	agg	Att	Rec	Notes	Ref
1	Sat 16 Oct 1943	Barrow	15–8	Oldham	Craven Park				(Note: The first Yorkshire Cup match to be played by Barrow and also the first to be played at Craven Park)	
2	Sat 16 Oct 1943	Batley	2–19	Featherstone Rovers	Mount Pleasant					
3	Sat 16 Oct 1943	Bradford Northern	8–0	Dewsbury	Odsal					
4	Sat 16 Oct 1943	Halifax	22–10	Wakefield Trinity	Thrum Hall					
5	Sat 16 Oct 1943	Hull	6–12	Huddersfield	Boulevard					
6	Sat 16 Oct 1943	Leeds	18–5	Hunslet	Headingley					
7	Sat 16 Oct 1943	St. Helens	9–14	Wigan	Knowsley Road					
8	Sat 16 Oct 1943	York	5–5	Keighley	Clarence Street					

=== Round 1 - Second Leg ===
Involved 8 matches (with no byes) and 16 clubs

All first round ties are played on a two-legged home and away basis

Game No	Fixture date	Home team	Score	Away team	Venue	agg	Att	Rec	Notes	Ref
1	Sat 23 Oct 1943	Oldham	11–10	Barrow	Watersheddings	19–25				
2	Sat 23 Oct 1943	Featherstone Rovers	10–11	Batley	Post Office Road	29–13				
3	Sat 23 Oct 1943	Dewsbury	2–7	Bradford Northern	Crown Flatt	2–15				
4	Sat 23 Oct 1943	Wakefield Trinity	9–9	Halifax	Belle Vue	19–31				
5	Sat 23 Oct 1943	Huddersfield	20–2	Hull	Fartown	32–8				
6	Sat 23 Oct 1943	Hunslet	8–13	Leeds	Parkside	13–31				
7	Sat 23 Oct 1943	Wigan	20–10	St. Helens	Central Park	34–19				
8	Sat 23 Oct 1943	Keighley	30–7	York	Lawkholme Lane	35–12				

=== Round 2 – quarterfinals - First leg ===
Involved 4 matches and 8 clubs

All second round ties are played on a two-legged home and away basis

Game No	Fixture date	Home team	Score	Away team	Venue	agg	Att	Rec	Notes	Ref
1	Sat 30 Oct 1943	Barrow	17–8	Wigan	Craven Park					
2	Sat 30 Oct 1943	Halifax	17–20	Keighley	Thrum Hall					
3	Sat 30 Oct 1943	Huddersfield	7–5	Featherstone Rovers	Fartown					
4	Sat 30 Oct 1943	Leeds	2–5	Bradford Northern	Headingley					

=== Round 2 - Second Leg ===
Involved 4 matches and 8 clubs

All second round ties are played on a two-legged home and away basis

Game No	Fixture date	Home team	Score	Away team	Venue	agg	Att	Rec	Notes	Ref
1	Sat 06 Nov 1943	Wigan	10–7	Barrow	Central Park	18–24				
2	Sat 06 Nov 1943	Keighley	8–2	Halifax	Lawkholme Lane	28–19				
3	Sat 06 Nov 1943	Featherstone Rovers	5–9	Huddersfield	Post Office Road	10–16				
4	Sat 06 Nov 1943	Bradford Northern	26–0	Leeds	Odsal	31–2				

=== Round 3 – semifinals - First Leg ===
Involved 2 matches and 4 clubs

Both semi-final ties are played on a two-legged home and away basis

Game No	Fixture date	Home team	Score	Away team	Venue	agg	Att	Rec	Notes	Ref
1	Sat 13 Nov 1943	Barrow	3–6	Bradford Northern	Craven Park					
2	Sat 13 Nov 1943	Keighley	21–0	Huddersfield	Lawkholme Lane					

=== Semifinal - Second Leg ===
Involved 2 matches and 4 clubs

Both semi-final ties are played on a two-legged home and away basis

Game No	Fixture date	Home team	Score	Away team	Venue	agg	Att	Rec	Notes	Ref
1	Sat 20 Nov 1943	Bradford Northern	12–11	Barrow	Odsal	18–14				
2	Sat 20 Nov 1943	Huddersfield	13–4	Keighley	Fartown	13–25				

=== Final - First leg ===
The final was played on a two-legged home and away basis this season

Game No	Fixture date	Home team	Score	Away team	Venue	agg	Att	Rec	Notes	Ref
	Saturday 27 November 1943	Bradford Northern	5–2	Keighley	Odsal		10,251	£757		

=== Final - Second Leg ===
The final was played on a two-legged home and away basis this season

Game No	Fixture date	Home team	Score	Away team	Venue	agg	Att	Rec	Notes	Ref
	Saturday 4 December 1943	Keighley	5–5	Bradford Northern	Lawkholme Lane	7–10	8,993	£634		

==== Teams and scorers ====
Bradford Northern	No.	Keighley
	teams	
George Carmichael	1	
Eric Batten	2	
?. James (1st leg), E Billington (2nd leg)	3	
Ernest Ward	4	
Emlyn Walters	5	
Willie Davies	6	
Donald Ward	7	
Laurie Roberts	8	
Vic Darlison	9	
Leonard Higson	10	
Frank Murray	11	
Trevor Foster	12	
William Hutchinson	13	
Dai Rees	Coach	??
5	score	2
	HT	
	Scorers	
	Tries	
	T	
	Goals	
	G	
	Drop Goals	
	DG	
Referee		unknown ()
Second Leg
Bradford Northern	teams	Keighley
	1	
	2	
	3	
	4	
	5	
	6	
	7	
	8	
	9	
	10	
	11	
	12	
	13	
	Coach	
5	Score	5
	HT	
	Scorers	
	Tries	
	Goals	
	G	
Referee		unknown ()

Scoring - Try = three (3) points - Goal = two (2) points - Drop goal = two (2) points

=== The road to success ===
All the ties (including the final itself) were played on a two leg (home and away) basis.

The first club named in each of the ties played the first leg at home.

The scores shown are the aggregate score over the two legs.

First round
Barrow	25
Oldham	19
St. Helens	19
Wigan	34
Leeds	31
Hunslet	13
Bradford Northern	15
Dewsbury	2
Halifax	31
Wakefield Trinity	19
York	12
Keighley	35
Hull	8
Huddersfield	32
Batley	13
Featherstone Rovers	29

Second round
Barrow	24
Wigan	18
Leeds	2
Bradford Northern	32
Halifax	19
Keighley	28
Huddersfield	16
Featherstone Rovers	10

Semifinals
Barrow	14
Bradford Northern	18
Keighley	25
Huddersfield	13

Final
Bradford Northern	10
Keighley	7

== See also ==
- 1943–44 Northern Rugby Football League Wartime Emergency League season
- Rugby league county cups
- Keighley - the 1930s, and 1940s
