= 1939–40 Northern Rugby Football League Wartime Emergency League season =

English rugby league season

- League: Northern Rugby League

1939–40 Season
- League Champions: Bradford Northern

Yorkshire competition
- Number of teams: 15
- Champions: Bradford Northern

Lancashire competition
- Number of teams: 12
- Champions: Swinton

The 1939–40 Northern Rugby Football League season was an emergency season of English rugby league fixtures necessitated by the outbreak of the Second World War. The regular league season had started at the end of August 1939, but on the outbreak of war all sport was suspended. When government permission for sport to be resumed was given, the league was reorganised into two regional competitions, Yorkshire and Lancashire. The winners of each league playing against each other to decide the overall champions. The Yorkshire competition was won by Bradford Northern who beat Swinton, winners of the Lancashire competition, in the two-legged league final.

The season also saw the resumption of County Cup competition, as well as some representative matches arranged to raise funds for the British Red Cross. The Challenge Cup competition, traditionally run alongside the league, was not played for the first time since 1919.

== Planned season ==
The planned 1939–40 season had begun as scheduled on Saturday 26 August 1939 with 27 clubs starting the season. This was one less than the previous season as St Helens Recs had disbanded at the end of the 1938–39 season. The withdrawal of St Helens Recs required a change in the way fixtures were organised. With 28 clubs in the league, each club was a member of the 14 team Lancashire League or the 14 team Yorkshire League. The actual geographical split of clubs was 15 clubs based in Yorkshire and 13 in Lancashire, so Halifax played as a member of the Lancashire League. Each teams' fixture list comprised a home and away fixture against all the teams in their county league (26), as well as home and away fixtures against seven teams in the other county league (14) for a total of 40 games.

With only 27 clubs the League's secretary, John Wilson, proposed a 36-game season for each club with Halifax remaining in the Lancashire league, and Dewsbury, who were the lowest finishing Yorkshire team in the previous season, playing as a member of neither county league. For the purposes of determining fixture lists Dewsbury would be considered the 14th team of both county leagues. Excepting Dewsbury, each team's fixture list would comprise the other teams in their own county league (24 games) together with six teams from the other county (12 games). Dewsbury's opponents would be nine clubs from each county.

At the League's annual general meeting on 7 June 1939 the clubs accepted Wilson's proposal regarding the positions of Halifax and Dewsbury, but voted for a 40-game fixture list instead of Wilson's 36 game proposal. The fixture lists were issued later in June. Each team, except Dewsbury, had home and away fixtures against all the teams in their own county league (24 games). They also had home and away fixtures against eight teams in the other county league (16 games). Dewsbury's fixture list comprised home and away fixtures against 10 teams from each county league.

A full programme of games was played up to Saturday 2 September. By that date most clubs had played two or three games as some clubs had played midweek matches.

=== International tour ===
The touring New Zealand side had played one match of their tour before the declaration of war. The tour was cancelled on 5 September and the team returned home shortly afterwards, although they did manage to play a hastily arranged fixture against Dewsbury on 9 September.

== Suspension of the League ==
On Monday 4 September the day after the declaration of war, all rugby league games and all other spectator sports and public entertainments were suspended by provisions of the Prohibition of Public Entertainments (Defence) Order, one of numerous orders made following the enactment of the Emergency Powers (Defence) Act 1939. As a result, some clubs like Wigan and Salford announced they were closing for the duration of the war and that their players were released.

One issue clubs had to consider was what to do with the monies paid for season-tickets, the holders of which may have only seen one or two games. Barrow, for one, resolved to repay season-ticket holders less a deduction for games seen, while Oldham decided not to give any refunds stating, "We are up against it and must appeal to our members to make this sacrifice".

Under the defence regulations and air raid precautions, all areas of the country were designated as evacuation, (Note: The evacuation areas in Yorkshire and Lancashire were Bradford, Leeds, Sheffield, Kingston, Grimsby, Cleethorpes, Middlesbrough, Rotherham, Liverpool, Bootle, Wallasey, Birkenhead, Manchester, Salford, Crosby, Stretford, Widnes, Litherland and Runcorn. This meant that the grounds of Bradford Northern, Leeds, Hunslet, Bramley, Hull, Hull Kingston Rovers, Liverpool Stanley, Salford, Widnes and Broughton Rangers were all in evacuation areas.) neutral or reception areas depending on the assessment of an area as an enemy target and its ability to receive people from the evacuation areas. The defence regulations allowed for the resumption of sporting events within reception or neutral areas and on 9 September the Home Secretary issued the Public Entertainments (Restriction) Order allowing events to go ahead outside evacuation areas. Attendances were limited to 8,000 or 15,000 at grounds with a capacity over 60,000.

On 11 September the Rugby League Council agreed to clubs playing friendlies on the following two Saturdays, while the League Secretary, John Wilson, arranged a programme of games. Players were to be paid 10s per match and their travelling expenses, while the minimum entrance fee was set at 6d. The meeting also appointed a wartime committee to run the league for the duration of the war.

Seven games were played on 16 September and eleven on 23 September. A further change in the defence orders allowed games to go ahead in evacuation areas as long as the consent of the local chief constable had been obtained.

== County competitions ==
Wilson's proposal, which was accepted on 11 September, was for the league to run as two parallel county competitions, a Yorkshire Competition and a Lancashire Competition under the umbrella name of the Lancashire and Yorkshire Emergency Period League. The leagues would be played on a simple home and away basis; gate money was to be split equally between the two clubs after deducting player expenses and travel expenses for 15 players of the away club. Players' expenses were limited to 10s per game plus meal expenses if they had to travel more than 25 miles (40.2 km) to an away game. These allowances replaced any previous contractual arrangements between the players and the clubs and in effect removed the professional status from the players. Referees were to be allowed 10s plus travel expenses and touch judges 5s plus travel expenses. Players were also allowed to play for another club if that club was closer to home or work, subject to agreement of their first club. This was to alleviate travelling for players who worked away.

No inter-competition games were planned, but in January 1940 it was proposed and agreed that there should be a two-legged final between the winner of each competition to decide the overall league champions. Clubs were asked to notify Wilson as soon as possible if they intended to play in the competitions. In the end all 27 clubs, including those like Salford and Wigan who had previously decided to cease operating, had entered when the fixture list was issued.

The rules also allowed alternative venues to be used if a club's home ground was unavailable, either temporarily or permanently. Broughton Rangers home ground, Belle Vue was unavailable to them all season so they played at a variety of other grounds, while Salford and Swinton shared Swinton's Station Road.

=== Player protest ===
Even before the season started players at Bradford Northern, Halifax and Huddersfield protested that the expense limit of 10s per game was insufficient and that they would not play unless the expenses were increased. The Lord Mayor of Bradford, T. J. Robinson had anticipated the players' stance. At a lunch for the wartime committee, he was reported as saying "the committee members would have difficulty in getting first-class footballers, used to getting £4 or £5 to accept remuneration of 10s per match, but no doubt the difficulties would be surmounted". The players most opposed to the expense limit were those of Bradford Northern who were unanimous in their opposition and had made it clear to the club secretary that they were not prepared to play for 10s per game. The secretary had informed Wilson of this asking for a special meeting of the clubs to discuss the issue. At this stage Wilson did not consider discussion appropriate unless 20 or more of the clubs requested it. The Huddersfield players also informed their club committee that they were not prepared to play on the following Saturday. At Halifax the secretary stated reports of a strike were exaggerated and that the "players were quite willing, indeed they were anxious to play but they were not prepared to run the risk of losing the jobs they had got, or of being off work, for the small amount they were permitted to receive".

The chairman of the Rugby League Council, G.F. Hutchins, responded by asking all players to give the 10s expenses a month's trial after which the issue would be reviewed. While players at St. Helens accepted the 10s limit, at Barrow team selection for Saturday was delayed because of the issue; while some clubs, including Halifax, Dewsbury and Batley, called for an increase in the limit.

On Friday 29 September the Halifax players agreed to play but remained dissatisfied by the expense allowance; the Bradford players remained adamant leaving the club no alternative but to inform their opponents for Saturday, Hull Kingston Rovers that the game could not go ahead. Players from many clubs met on 2 October and agreed to continue to press the issue with the Rugby Football League, but they would play "on Saturday in order to keep faith with the public". After the second weekend of the competitions, the Rugby League Council met to discuss the expenses issue and agreed a doubling of the expenses limit to £1. Expenses for referees were also increased to £1, but touch judges' expenses remained unchanged at 5s. Also, clubs could make an additional payment of 5s to each player for away games played in Barrow or Hull due to the extra travelling time needed. To increase the likelihood that gates would be adequate, the minimum entry for a game was increased to 1s but remained at 6d for women, children and any uniformed members of the armed forces. The players responded by welcoming the rise but asked the Rugby League Council to consider changing the system to a payment of 25s to players on the winning team and 15s to the members of the losing team. The players felt this would increase competitiveness in the games. The wartime committee met the following week but made no response to the player's suggestion. Bonuses were not discussed further except at the end of the season when the league awarded monetary prizes rather than medals.

=== Yorkshire competition ===
With 15 teams the fixture list for the Yorkshire competition contained 28 fixtures for each team with the season end date being 11 May. Until Christmas 1939 the competition progressed as planned although at least one game was concluded early; Hull v Batley on 21 October was ended after 65 minutes due to an air raid warning. (Note: The result of the game stood as this circumstance had been anticipated and the competition rules stated that results would stand as long as 60 minutes had been played.) The last week of December 1939 was the start of the third coldest winter of the 20th century and the most severe in the United Kingdom since 1895. Heavy snow and prolonged cold periods, together with the lack of material to protect the pitches, meant that after the games played on Boxing Day 1939 no games were played in Yorkshire until 24 February when a single match, Hull F.C. v Leeds beat the weather; it was the following Saturday, 2 March 1940, before a full schedule resumed. A backlog of over 100 games built up and it became apparent that it would be impossible to complete the fixtures by the end of April without many midweek games being played. (Note: Midweek games were unpopular with clubs and spectators due to clashes with work commitments.) The decision was taken to extend the season. The clubs were urged to complete their fixtures by 4 May, but as the backlog grew the date was moved to 11 May with the Championship final scheduled for 18 and 25 May. The extension required a ballot of all the clubs as the games' by-laws specified that they could not be played between the second Saturday in May and the last Saturday in August. Despite all the urging, the games did not finish on time. By 31 May there were still three fixtures outstanding. Hull F.C. had away fixtures against Batley and Keighley to play, and Hull Kingston Rovers were still to play Dewsbury at home. These games never were played as Hull F.C. reported in July that their two fixtures were unplayed and both Keighley and Batley had withdrawn from the Yorkshire Cup ending their seasons in May due to problems raising teams. With two points awarded for a win, the non-playing of these three games had no bearing on the outcome of the competition. Bradford secured the title with a game to spare when they beat Hull Kingston Rovers on 13 May giving them a three-point lead over Huddersfield, and a six-point lead over Hull F.C.

==== Results ====
| Home \ Away | Bfd | Bat | Brm | Cas | Dew | Fev | Hfx | Hud | Hull | HKR | Hun | Kly | Lds | Wak | Yrk |
|---|---|---|---|---|---|---|---|---|---|---|---|---|---|---|---|
| Bradford Northern | — | 36–12 | 38–2 | 24–10 | 31–9 | 26–5 | 33–14 | 23–26 | 36–17 | 31–3 | 23–14 | 20–10 | 15–8 | 12–11 | 34–13 |
| Batley | 0–18 | — | 18–9 | 24–19 | 15–8 | 4–2 | 2–18 | 5–10 | Not played | 32–0 | 3–12 | 29–2 | 5–8 | 10–5 | 6–18 |
| Bramley | 10–13 | 0–9 | — | 5–11 | 6–2 | 8–10 | 4–21 | 9–17 | 10–12 | 6–32 | 13–11 | 24–3 | 8–30 | 10–42 | 8–18 |
| Castleford | 15–19 | 20–10 | 33–4 | — | 13–2 | 13–11 | 18–4 | 13–3 | 18–2 | 12–7 | 15–8 | 14–8 | 10–9 | 8–6 | 34–8 |
| Dewsbury | 14–13 | 12–2 | 35–14 | 13–5 | — | 15–16 | 12–10 | 15–36 | 3–7 | 7–8 | 12–26 | 19–8 | 10–4 | 13–11 | 12–12 |
| Featherstone Rovers | 5–6 | 24–2 | 22–14 | 16–13 | 13–21 | — | 13–32 | 10–5 | 25–8 | 11–23 | 15–27 | 38–8 | 17–13 | 27–8 | 2–16 |
| Halifax | 22–18 | 9–8 | 24–15 | 12–9 | 22–6 | 11–23 | — | 8–10 | 30–11 | 39–10 | 7–15 | 33–14 | 15–6 | 20–11 | 26–5 |
| Huddersfield | 4–5 | 28–10 | 44–7 | 12–5 | 28–8 | 16–6 | 8–20 | — | 7–10 | 15–17 | 15–9 | 74–10 | 27–17 | 38–17 | 22–10 |
| Hull | 13–2 | 28–0 | 27–2 | 13–12 | 4–8 | 25–5 | 17–2 | 12–5 | — | 11–10 | 18–9 | 25–18 | 6–7 | 20–11 | 22–5 |
| Hull Kingston Rovers | 18–23 | 15–10 | 21–16 | 5–11 | Not played | 15–12 | 12–2 | 6–10 | 7–14 | — | 23–5 | 8–5 | 18–15 | 13–8 | 36–10 |
| Hunslet | 10–5 | 17–3 | 32–13 | 15–7 | 4–8 | 8–20 | 16–29 | 17–17 | 7–6 | 28–4 | — | 16–2 | 14–4 | 20–15 | 29–10 |
| Keighley | 0–32 | 17–3 | 2–5 | 5–5 | 6–2 | 0–2 | 14–4 | 9–11 | Not played | 11–8 | 21–11 | — | 4–10 | 2–5 | 10–10 |
| Leeds | 17–5 | 20–18 | 33–8 | 4–10 | 24–6 | 13–8 | 10–5 | 7–10 | 6–23 | 29–6 | 15–8 | 31–7 | — | 5–18 | 20–9 |
| Wakefield Trinity | 16–5 | 24–6 | 42–6 | 31–0 | 45–3 | 5–7 | 6–13 | 34–18 | 8–18 | 23–0 | 8–16 | 19–6 | 14–13 | — | 24–5 |
| York | 4–16 | 27–5 | 15–12 | 20–6 | 15–15 | 5–8 | 13–10 | 13–20 | 11–3 | 38–18 | 8–26 | 18–19 | 13–12 | 0–8 | — |

Source: Yorkshire Post and Liverpool Daily Post
Legend: Blue = home team win; Yellow = draw; Red = away team win.

==== Final table ====
| Pos | Team | P | W | D | L | PF | PA | PD | Pts |
|---|---|---|---|---|---|---|---|---|---|
| 1 | Bradford Northern | 28 | 21 | 0 | 7 | 574 | 302 | 272 | 42 |
| 2 | Huddersfield | 28 | 19 | 1 | 8 | 545 | 340 | 205 | 39 |
| 3 | Hull | 26 | 18 | 0 | 8 | 376 | 265 | 111 | 36 |
| 4 | Halifax | 28 | 17 | 0 | 11 | 462 | 339 | 123 | 34 |
| 5 | Hunslet | 28 | 16 | 1 | 11 | 430 | 339 | 91 | 33 |
| 6 | Castleford | 28 | 16 | 1 | 11 | 364 | 300 | 64 | 33 |
| 7 | Featherstone Rovers | 28 | 15 | 0 | 13 | 373 | 365 | 8 | 30 |
| 8 | Wakefield Trinity | 28 | 14 | 0 | 14 | 479 | 314 | 165 | 28 |
| 9 | Leeds | 28 | 14 | 0 | 14 | 390 | 330 | 60 | 28 |
| 10 | Hull Kingston Rovers | 27 | 13 | 0 | 14 | 343 | 434 | -91 | 26 |
| 11 | Dewsbury | 27 | 11 | 2 | 14 | 291 | 406 | -115 | 24 |
| 12 | York | 28 | 10 | 3 | 15 | 349 | 467 | -118 | 23 |
| 13 | Batley | 27 | 8 | 0 | 19 | 255 | 406 | -151 | 16 |
| 14 | Keighley | 27 | 6 | 2 | 19 | 221 | 476 | -255 | 14 |
| 15 | Bramley | 28 | 4 | 0 | 24 | 248 | 617 | -369 | 8 |

=== Lancashire competition ===
The 12 teams of the Lancashire competition each had 22 fixtures to play. A season end date of 2 March was given when the fixture list was issued. Like the Yorkshire competition, the Lancashire competition progressed well until the end of 1939 but was hit badly by the hard winter. The absence of games was not as long as the barren spell experienced in Yorkshire; in the first two weeks of January 1940 three games were played all in the Lancashire competition. After that it was the last weekend in February before any more games were played. Catching up on the outstanding fixtures required some games to be scheduled close to each other. Oldham and Warrington rescheduled the two games between the clubs. Both were played over the Easter weekend, Oldham at home on Saturday and Warrington at home on Monday.

With a smaller backlog of games and fewer fixtures to be played, by the end of May there was only one fixture left to be played—Oldham v Rochdale. The game had previously been postponed twice at the request of Rochdale who then proposed the fixture be played on 1 June. However Oldham had already arranged a friendly against Huddersfield for the same day which they did not wish to postpone and instead proposed 8 June. Rochdale objected as they considered the outstanding league fixture should take precedence over a friendly. When Oldham refused, Rochdale wrote to the league and Oldham, stating that Rochdale did not intend to fulfil the fixture. The games' points were awarded to Oldham.

The title was won by Swinton on points difference ahead of Salford.

==== Results ====
| Home \ Away | Bar | Bro | Lei | Liv | Old | Roc | Sal | StH | Swi | War | Wid | Wig |
|---|---|---|---|---|---|---|---|---|---|---|---|---|
| Barrow | — | 26–7 | 50–11 | 22–5 | 22–14 | 25–3 | 5–14 | 17–15 | 20–2 | 19–0 | 5–16 | 18–14 |
| Broughton Rangers | 9–7 | — | 2–8 | 10–8 | 17–25 | 3–5 | 11–18 | 5–16 | 9–14 | 10–14 | 6–31 | 3–15 |
| Leigh | 11–8 | 35–3 | — | 10–6 | 22–11 | 3–16 | 0–2 | 5–16 | 2–21 | 10–15 | 8–18 | 11–30 |
| Liverpool Stanley | 13–13 | 6–3 | 13–10 | — | 12–38 | 12–5 | 7–7 | 0–20 | 0–26 | 2–18 | 8–9 | 2–9 |
| Oldham | 7–2 (Note: Abandoned after 72 minutes due to bad light) | 18–0 | 2–2 | 5–5 | — | 15–11 | 13–16 | 7–3 | 7–8 | 18–2 | 19–3 | 2–5 |
| Rochdale Hornets | 12–18 | 3–2 | 12–4 | 7–12 | Not played | — | 4–12 | 12–10 | 9–14 | 14–7 | 20–11 | 10–9 |
| Salford | 12–9 | 31–12 | 35–5 | 26–4 | 21–14 | 25–5 | — | 10–5 | 0–6 | 30–4 | 17–3 | 9–9 |
| St Helens | 23–3 | 27–9 | 11–5 | 18–8 | 12–5 | 28–9 | 10–15 | — | 15–7 | 13–0 | 11–20 | 9–12 |
| Swinton | 37–10 | 28–0 | 38–5 | 37–10 | 9–5 | 32–11 | 16–6 | 41–2 | — | 9–4 | 12–4 | 9–0 |
| Warrington | 16–5 | 39–10 | 14–13 | 23–7 | 46–11 | 10–5 | 12–14 | 8–6 | 17–5 | — | 10–10 | 3–24 |
| Widnes | 18–5 | 15–3 | 37–0 | 18–5 | 8–0 | 29–9 | 5–3 | 6–6 | 13–5 | 7–3 | — | 13–8 |
| Wigan | 27–4 | 26–8 | 0–3 | 16–7 | 16–5 | 25–6 | 12–5 | 6–0 | 9–2 | 16–7 | 13–11 | — |

Source: Yorkshire Post and Liverpool Daily Post
Legend: Blue = home team win; Yellow = draw; Red = away team win.

==== Final table ====
| Pos | Team | P | W | D | L | PF | PA | PD | Pts |
|---|---|---|---|---|---|---|---|---|---|
| 1 | Swinton | 22 | 17 | 0 | 5 | 378 | 158 | 220 | 34 |
| 2 | Salford | 22 | 16 | 2 | 4 | 328 | 171 | 157 | 34 |
| 3 | Wigan | 22 | 16 | 1 | 5 | 301 | 157 | 144 | 33 |
| 4 | Widnes | 22 | 15 | 2 | 5 | 305 | 176 | 129 | 32 |
| 5 | St. Helens | 22 | 11 | 1 | 10 | 288 | 224 | 64 | 23 |
| 6 | Warrington | 22 | 11 | 1 | 10 | 281 | 258 | 23 | 23 |
| 7 | Barrow | 22 | 10 | 1 | 11 | 303 | 286 | 17 | 21 |
| 8 | Oldham | 21 | 9 (Note: Oldham were awarded a win and Rochdale a loss from the unplayed game between the two clubs due to Rochdale declining to play the game.) | 2 | 11 | 241 | 242 | -1 | 20 |
| 9 | Rochdale Hornets | 21 | 8 | 0 | 14 | 197 | 306 | -109 | 16 |
| 10 | Leigh | 22 | 6 | 1 | 15 | 188 | 346 | -158 | 13 |
| 11 | Liverpool Stanley | 22 | 4 | 3 | 15 | 152 | 350 | -198 | 11 |
| 12 | Broughton Rangers | 22 | 2 | 0 | 20 | 153 | 441 | -288 | 4 |

=== Championship play-off ===
The Championship was decided by a two leg play-off between Swinton and Bradford Northern on a home and away basis. Bradford Northern won 37–22 on aggregate having won both legs.

==== First leg ====
18 May 1940

| Swinton | 13 – 21 | Bradford Northern |
|---|---|---|
| Tries: Shaw, Hopkin, McGurk; Goals: Hodgson (2) | | Tries: Harrison, Smith, Davies, Whitcombe, Brogden; Goals: Carmichael (3) |

Station Road
Attendance: 4,800
Referee: J.E. Taylor

Team details
| Swinton | | Position | Bradford Northern |
| Name | Number | Position | Number | Name |
|---|---|---|---|---|
| Bartram | 1 | FB | 1 | Carmichael |
| Hopkin | 2 | WG | 2 | Jenkins (Note: Guest player from Keighley) |
| Lewis | 3 | CE | 3 | Winnard |
| Shaw | 4 | CE | 4 | Brogden (Note: Guest player from Hull F.C.) |
| McGurk | 5 | WG | 5 | Walters |
| Bowyer | 6 | SO | 6 | Davies |
| Holland | 7 | SH | 7 | D. Ward |
| Wright | 8 | PR | 8 | Whitcombe |
| Armitt | 9 | HK | 9 | Dilorenzo |
| Stoddart | 10 | PF | 10 | W. Smith |
| Hodgson | 11 | SR | 11 | Harrison |
| Williams | 12 | SR | 12 | Foster |
| Garner | 13 | LF | 13 | Moore |

The first leg was played at Swinton's Station Rd on 18 May 1940 in front of a crowd of 4,800. Gate receipts totalled £237.

Swinton took a 3–0 lead when Hopkin scored a try. But within minutes Bradford took the lead as Harrison scored a try which Carmichael converted to put Bradford 5–3 ahead. Swinton regained the lead through a McGurk try, converted by Hodgson, cancelled out by Bradford's second try by Smith which Carmichael again converted. This gave Bradford a half-time lead 10–8.

In the second half it was Bradford who scored first with a Whitcombe try to which Carmichael added the conversion to make the score 15–8. Swinton reduced the gap to two points as Shaw scored with Hodgson converting. Bradford's fourth try came from a Swinton penalty kick that hit the post and rebounded into the field of play. It was gathered up by Bradford's Davies who ran the length of the pitch to score. A fifth try for Bradford, scored by Brogden, made the final score 21–13 to Bradford.

==== Second leg ====
25 May 1940

| Bradford Northern | 16 – 9 | Swinton |
|---|---|---|
| Tries: Winnard (2), Davies, Whitcombe; Goals: Carmichael (2) | | Tries: Williams; Goals: Hodgson (3) |

Odsal Stadium
Attendance: 11,271
Referee: P. Cowell

Team details
| Bradford Northern | | Position | Swinton |
| Name | Number | Position | Number | Name |
|---|---|---|---|---|
| Carmichael | 1 | FB | 1 | Bartram |
| Foster | 2 | WG | 2 | Hopkin |
| Winnard | 3 | CE | 3 | Lewis |
| Jenkins (Note: Guest player from Keighley) | 4 | CE | 4 | Shaw |
| Lambert | 5 | WG | 5 | McGurk |
| D. Ward | 6 | SO | 6 | Bowyer |
| Hayes | 7 | SH | 7 | Holland |
| Whitcombe | 8 | PR | 8 | Wright |
| Dilorenzo | 9 | HK | 9 | Armitt |
| W. Smith | 10 | PF | 10 | Stoddart |
| Harrison | 11 | SR | 11 | Hodgson |
| Higson | 12 | SR | 12 | Williams |
| Moore | 13 | LF | 13 | Garner |

The second leg was played the following Saturday, 25 May 1940 at Odsal Stadium. The crowd was 11,271 generating gate receipts of £570.

Bradford made a number of changes for the first leg due to injuries and players unable to get time off work. Bradford scored first with a Ward try to which Swinton replied with a Hodgson drop goal. This was Swinton's only score of the first half. Bradford scored two more tries through Winnard and Whitcombe, one of which Carmichael converted to give Bradford an 11–2 lead at half-time.

Swinton got a try back in the second half, but another try by Winnard and a Carmichael conversion extended Bradford's lead to 16–5. Two Hodgson penalties, the second of which was kicked from very close to the halfway line making the kick approximately 66 yards (60 m) from the goal posts, improved Swinton's score. Shortly before the end Jenkins (Bradford) and Bowyer (Swinton) were sent off for fighting. As Swinton had already lost Hopkin to injury they finished the game with only 11 players on the field as the game ended 16–9 to Bradford.

== Cup competitions ==
=== Challenge Cup ===
The Challenge Cup was suspended at the start of the war at the same time as all competitive games and it did not feature in the Rugby League's proposals for competitive football. As late as December 1939 the Lancashire County Committee were considering a proposal to reinstate the competition but the practicalities of scheduling and travel during wartime were considered too great to overcome.

=== Lancashire Cup ===
Although all cup competitions had been suspended at the outbreak of the war, as the season progressed there were calls for the County Cup competitions to be re-introduced. In December 1939 the wartime committee gave permission for the Lancashire Cup to be played. All ties including the final were to be two-legged with the winner being decided by aggregate score. With only 12 clubs participating only four rounds of competition were needed and these were scheduled for March and April 1940. After the first round the six winning clubs were drawn for the second round with two teams being given byes into the semi-finals. The two teams given byes were Swinton and Widnes who went on to win their semi-final matches.

The winners of the cup were Swinton who won the first leg of the final 5–4 at Widnes' Naughton Park ground on 20 April. In the second leg at Station Road, at full time the score was 9–8 to Widnes making the aggregate score 13–13. Under the competition rules extra time had to be played and Swinton won 16–11 to win the Cup 21–15 on aggregate.

=== Yorkshire Cup ===
Encouraged by the resumption of the Lancashire Cup, in December 1939 the Yorkshire clubs considered whether to reinstate the Yorkshire Cup but agreed to defer any decision until February 1940. At the club's February meeting it was agreed to ask the war-time committee for permission to play the competition on four consecutive Saturdays in May and June after the completion of the league season. As the request was made at the same time the league fixture backlog was increasing, the war-time committee arranged a postal ballot of all the clubs to amend the by-laws to allow games to be played in June; the vote to extend the season was carried 21–3 with 8 clubs not replying. A secondary proposal to pay match bonuses to players for cup games after the first round was rejected after a ballot of the clubs.

Unlike the Lancashire Cup, the Yorkshire Cup was to be a straightforward knockout competition. It was agreed that the first round fixtures would be those that had been drawn in May 1939 in anticipation of the Cup being at its regular dates in the season. The draw gave Huddersfield a bye; they would join the winners of the seven ties in the draw for the second round. Shortly before the first round ties were played on 1 June 1940, Batley, Bramley and Keighley all withdrew from the competition because they could not raise teams due to war work commitments or active service. The three ties were all awarded to their opponents.

The final was contested by Featherstone Rovers and Wakefield Trinity at Odsal Stadium, Bradford on 22 June 1940. Featherstone won 12–9 to win the Cup for the first time.

== Lancashire Summer Competition ==
In April 1940 eight of the Lancashire clubs agreed to play in a new league called the Lancashire Summer Competition. The teams were split into two groups of four with the two group leaders meeting in a single-legged play-off final on 22 June. The two groups, titled East and West comprised Barrow, Liverpool Stanley, Warrington and Wigan in the East group with Broughton Rangers, Leigh, Salford and Swinton in the West group. Players from the four teams who had decided not to enter were not allowed to play as guests in the competition. The games were to be played as a two-legged knockout tournament in the same manner as the Lancashire Cup.

Fixtures began on 11 May with Broughton Rangers playing Leigh, but within two weeks Barrow and Swinton withdrew from the competition. With only six teams left in the competition, the league committee decided to abandon the competition at the end of May.

== Representative matches ==
In October 1939 the league resolved to play three representative matches to raise funds for the Red Cross; England v Wales on 23 December 1939, Lancashire v Yorkshire at Barrow on 1 January 1940, and the 1936 Tourists v the Rest on 10 February 1940 at a venue to be confirmed.

In total the three games generated £1,561 for the British Red Cross.

=== England v Wales ===
23 December 1939
1:30pm

| England | 3–16 | Wales |
|---|---|---|
| Tries: Batten | | Tries: Davies, Foster; Goals: Sullivan (5) |

Odsal Stadium, Bradford
Attendance: 15,257
Referee: P. Cowell

Team details
| England | | Position | Wales |
| Name | Number | Position | Number | Name |
|---|---|---|---|---|
| Billy Belshaw | 1 | FB | 1 | Jim Sullivan |
| Eric Batten | 2 | WG | 2 | Arthur Bassett |
| Jim Croston | 3 | CE | 3 | Cliff Evans |
| Johnny Lawrenson | 4 | CE | 4 | Gus Risman |
| Ossie Peake | 5 | WG | 5 | Alan Edwards |
| Tom Kenny | 6 | SO | 6 | Willie Davies |
| Herbert Goodfellow | 7 | SH | 7 | Dai Jenkins |
| Francis Gregory | 8 | PR | 8 | Frank Whitcombe |
| Tommy Armitt | 9 | HK | 9 | Con Murphy |
| Harry Dyer | 10 | PF | 10 | Dai Davies |
| Robert Roberts | 11 | SR | 11 | Trevor Foster |
| Charlie Booth | 12 | SR | 12 | Sandy Orford |
| Ted Sadler | 13 | LF | 13 | Alex Givvons |

The first game, England v Wales, was played at Odsal, Bradford on 23 December 1939. A crowd of over 15,000 saw Wales win 16–3.

=== Lancashire v Yorkshire ===
23 March 1940
3:15pm

| Lancashire | v | Yorkshire |
|---|---|---|
| Tries: Hodgson, Marklew; Goals: Hodgson (2) | | Tries: Batten (2), Foster; Goals: Lockwood (2) |

Team details
| Lancashire | | Position | Yorkshire |
| Name | Number | Position | Number | Name |
|---|---|---|---|---|
| Billy Belshaw | 1 | FB | 1 | Hubert Lockwood |
| Stanley Powell | 2 | WG | 2 | Eric Batten |
| Albert Butler | 3 | CE | 3 | Cliff Evans |
| Gus Risman | 4 | CE | 4 | Henry Mills |
| Alan Edwards | 5 | WG | 5 | James Milner |
| Jack Bowker | 6 | SO | 6 | Willie Davies |
| Billy Little | 7 | SH | 7 | Dai Jenkins |
| Cod Miller | 8 | PR | 8 | Frank Whitcombe |
| Tommy Armitt | 9 | HK | 9 | Billy Watson |
| Francis Gregory | 10 | PF | 10 | Hudson Irving |
| Bob Ayres | 11 | SR | 11 | Charlie Booth |
| Martin Hodgson | 12 | SR | 12 | Trevor Foster |
| Alf Marklew | 13 | LF | 13 | Harry Beverley |

The second game was scheduled for 1 January 1940 and was a match between representative teams of the Lancashire and Yorkshire clubs. It was postponed in December 1939 at the request of the Barrow club as the Barrow shipyards were not taking New Years Day, a Monday, as a holiday. Eventually played at Craven Park on 23 March before a crowd of 8,683, Yorkshire beat Lancashire 13–10 having been 2–10 behind at half-time.

=== 1940 Probables v 1936 Tourists ===
4 May 1940

| 1940 Probables | 29–21 | 1936 Tourists |
|---|---|---|
| Tries: Williams, Jenkins (2), Foster (2), Brooks, Irving; Goals: Kelly, Fiddes, Croston (2) | | Tries: Brogden (2), Edwards (3); Goals: Risman, Hodgson (2) |

The Willows, Salford
Attendance: 7,000
Referee: G S Phillips

Team details
| 1940 Probables | | Position | 1936 Tourists |
| Name | Number | Position | Number | Name |
|---|---|---|---|---|
| Jack Kelly | 1 | FB | 1 | Billy Belshaw |
| Bill Johnson | 2 | WG | 2 | Barney Hudson |
| Alex Fiddes | 3 | CE | 3 | Stan Brogden |
| Jim Croston | 4 | CE | 4 | Gus Risman |
| Syd Williams | 5 | WG | 5 | Alan Edwards |
| Willie Davies | 6 | SO | 6 | Tommy McCue |
| Dai Jenkins | 7 | SH | 7 | Billy Watkins (rugby) |
| Frank Whitcombe | 8 | PR | 8 | Dai Davies |
| Edgar Brooks | 9 | HK | 9 | Tommy Armitt |
| Glyn Jones | 10 | PF | 10 | Cod Miller |
| Hudson Irving | 11 | SR | 11 | Harold Thomas |
| Jack Fearnley | 12 | SR | 12 | Martin Hodgson |
| Trevor Foster | 13 | LF | 13 | Jack Feetham |

The third game, postponed from 10 February, was played at Salford on 4 May between the 1936 Tourists (players from the 1936 team that toured Australia) and the 1940 Probables (players who probably would have toured Australia in 1940 had the war not intervened). Last minute changes in availability meant that the Tourists side included three Salford players who had not been part of the tour team. The 1940 Probables won the game 29–21 in front of a crowd of 7,000.

== Finances ==
The season was costly both to the Rugby Football League and to many clubs. The Rugby Football League had income of only £899 in the year to 31 May 1940 and lost £3,015, reducing its assets to £23,304. This compared to a loss of £1,710 in the previous year. The two County Leagues had mixed fortunes. Lancashire made a profit of £63 while Yorkshire made a loss of £121.

At club level many clubs reported losses, these ranged from £47 at Batley and £87 at Rochdale to £998 at Castleford and £1,314 at Wigan. A minority of clubs reported making a profit; St Helens £5 Oldham £114, Swinton £515 and Dewsbury £750, but these club were far fewer in number than the clubs reporting losses.

== Sources ==
- Collins, Tony (2006). Rugby League in Twentieth Century Britain: A Social and Cultural History. Routledge. ISBN 978-0415396158.
- Fletcher, Raymond; Howes, David, eds. (1982). Rothmans Rugby League 1982–83 Yearbook. ISBN 0 907574 15 7.
- Titmuss, Richard (1950). "Chapter III Preparations: Evacuations". Problems of Social Policy. HMSO.
