= 1944–45 Northern Rugby Football League Wartime Emergency League season =

- League: Northern Rugby Football League Wartime Emergency League season

1944–45 Season
- Champions: Bradford Northern
- Runner-up: Halifax

The 1944–45 Northern Rugby Football Union season was the sixth (and would be the last) season of the rugby league’s Wartime Emergency League necessitated by the Second World War. As in the previous (fifth) Wartime season, the clubs each played a different number of games, but this season clubs re-joined the league and there were now 17 of the original clubs taking part in the Competition (but still only Oldham, St Helens and Wigan from west of the Pennines). The League remained as one single amalgamated Championship.

== General Comments ==
=== Season summary ===
The 1944–45 season began on Saturday 2 September 1944. As in the previous season, there are still only the three Lancashire clubs who have not had to close down and withdrawn from the League. The Northern Rugby League continued with a single (now) 17 club single Competition. As the clubs are still playing different number of marches, the league positions and the title would be decided on a percentage basis.

At the completion of the regular season Bradford Northern were on top of the league on the percentage success (with 34 points from 20 games and a percentage success of 85.00%) with Halifax second (27 points from 16 games @ 84.38%). Last season’s League Leaders Wakefield Trinity although with the same number of points as Bradford Northern had played more games and finished in third position with 34 points from 23 games – percentage success 73.91% Wigan finished with one point more than Bradford Northern but had played 4 more games and finished fourth (with a record of played 24 points 35 points and 72.92%) Castleford finished in a creditable 6th position in their first season back after an earlier withdrawal. St. Helens, for the third consecutive season, finished (this time joint with York.) bottom (16th out of the 17 clubs) with only 9 points from 23 games and with a points difference of (minus) -217. The two clubs had almost identical records – but St. Helens avoided the wooden spoon as they had a better points record than York (points difference (minus)-273). Bradford Northern beat Halifax 26-20 on aggregate in the two legged play-off final. and win the Championship. The Wartime Emergency League did not count as an official league championship.

In the Final of the Rugby league Challenge Cup, Huddersfield beat Bradford Northern 13-9 on aggregate over two legs in front of an aggregate crowd of 26,541.

The Lancashire County Cup, suspended for season 1940–41 remained so for the rest of the war and again Wigan competed in the Yorkshire Cup.

In the Final of the Yorkshire County Cup, Halifax beat Hunslet by 14-3 on aggregate in two low scoring legs before an aggregate crowd of 20,800.

=== Change in Club participation ===
==== Previous withdrawals ====
The following clubs had withdrawn from the League, before this 1944–45 season's completion began:-

St Helens Recs – who folded before the war started.
Hull Kingston Rovers – who withdrew after the end of the first (1939–40) season finished and did not rejoin until the 1945–46 season.
Rochdale Hornets – As Hull Kingston Rovers.
Widnes – As Hull Kingston Rovers.
Liverpool Stanley – withdrew after the end of the second 1940–41 season finished and did not rejoin until the 1945–46 season.
Salford – As Liverpool Stanley.
Swinton – As Liverpool Stanley.
Warrington – As Liverpool Stanley.
Broughton Rangers – withdrew early in the 1941–42 season and did not rejoin until the 1945–46 season.
Leigh - During the Second World War, the club was forced to leave its ground as the adjacent cable factory extended onto the land.

The townsfolk of Leigh, acting on chairman James Hilton's inspiration, cleared some fields on the edge of the town, and built a new stadium, including moving and rebuilding the old grandstand from the original ground. In 1941–42, Leigh quit the wartime Lancashire league and would not return to the league until 1946–47 when they played as a temporary measure at the Athletic Ground, Holden Road before moving to Kirkhall Lane (which was later officially renamed Hilton Park after James Hilton).

Bramley – withdrew after the end of the third 1941–42 season finished and did not re-join until the 1945–46 season.
Castleford – withdrew after the end of the third 1941–42 season finished and did not participate for two seasons, re-joining for the 1944–45 season.

==== New withdrawals ====
There were no more new withdrawals

==== Clubs Re-joining ====
Castleford – had withdrawn after the end of the third 1941–42 season finished and did not participate for two seasons, now re-joined for this 1944–45 season.
Barrow and Hunslet who had re-joined the previous season, continued.

==== Special Note ====
Dewsbury had a relatively successful time during the war years. Managed by Eddie Waring, and with the side boosted by the inclusion of a number of big-name guest players, the club won the Wartime Emergency League in 1941–42 and again the following season 1942–43 (though that championship was declared null and void when it was discovered they had played an ineligible player). They were also runners-up in the Championship in 1943–44, Challenge Cup winners in 1943 and Yorkshire Cup Final appearances in this season 1940–41 and winners in 1942–43.

== Championship ==
	Team	P	W	D	L	PF	PA	diff	Pts	%	Note	ref
1	Bradford Northern	20	17	0	3	337	69	268	34	85.00		
2	Halifax	16	13	1	2	288	78	210	27	84.38		
3	Wakefield Trinity	23	17	0	6	380	203	177	34	73.91		
4	Wigan	24	17	1	6	302	138	164	35	72.92		
5	Barrow	23	15	1	7	221	167	54	31	67.39		
6	Castleford	23	14	2	7	274	139	135	30	66.22		
7	Dewsbury	22	11	1	10	243	213	30	23	52.27		
8	Batley	22	10	2	10	186	241	-55	22	50.00		
9	Huddersfield	24	8	6	10	281	252	29	22	45.83		
10	Leeds	23	9	2	12	221	236	-15	20	43.48		
11	Hunslet	21	7	2	12	164	245	-81	16	38.10		
12	Hull	23	8	1	14	193	281	-88	17	36.96		
13	Oldham	23	8	1	14	189	282	-93	17	36.96		
14	Featherstone Rovers	22	8	0	14	153	229	-76	16	36.36		
15	Keighley	21	7	0	14	114	283	-169	14	33.33		
16	St. Helens	23	4	1	18	177	394	-217	9	19.57		
17	York	23	4	1	18	153	426	-273	9	19.57		

Heading Abbreviations

RL = Single division; Pl = Games played; W = Win; D = Draw; L = Lose; PF = Points for; PA = Points against; Diff = Points difference (+ or -); Pts = League points
% Pts = A percentage system was used to determine league positions due to clubs playing varying number of fixtures and against different opponents
League points: for win = 2; for draw = 1; for loss = 0.

== Championship play-off ==
Semi-finals
1	Bradford Northern	18
4	Wigan	15
2	Halifax	17
3	Wakefield Trinity	11

Championship final
Bradford Northern	2	24	26
Halifax	9	11	20

=== Final ===
==== First leg ====
19 May 1945

Halifax	9 – 2	Bradford Northern
Tries: McCue; Goals: Lockwood (3)		Goals: Ward

Thrum Hall, Halifax
Attendance: 9,426
Referee: J. E. Taylor (Wakefield)

==== Second leg ====
21 May 1945

Bradford Northern	24 – 11	Halifax
Tries: D. Ward (2), Edwards, Kitching, Best, Marklew; Goals: E. Ward (3)		Tries: McCue; Goals: Lockwood (4)

Odsal, Bradford
Attendance: 16,000
Referee: A. S. Dobson (Featherstone)

== Trophies ==
=== Challenge Cup ===
The Challenge Cup Competition had been suspended for season 1939–40, but after being re-introduced for the following season 1940–41 continued again this season. Each round including the final was played in two legs on a home and away basis

Below are given some of the fixtures and results from this year’s Challenge Cup competition.

Date	Stage	Home team	score	Away team	Venue	agg	att	rcts	Note	ref
1st Round
CC R1 1st leg	Sat 17-03-1945	Hull	13-18	Dewsbury	Boulevard					
CC R1 1st leg	Sat 17-05-1945	St. Helens	8-15	Bradford Northern	Knowsley Rd					
CC R1 2nd leg	Sat 24-03-1945	Dewsbury	23-9	Hull	Crown Flatt	41-22				
CC R1 2nd leg	Sat 24-03-1945	Bradford Northern	34-13	St. Helens	Odsal	49-21				
2nd Round
CC R2 1st leg	Sat 17-03-1945	Halifax	10-11	Wigan	Thrum Hall	Lost				
CC R2 2nd leg	Sat 24-03-1945	Wigan	6-21	Halifax	Central Park	17-31				
3rd Round
CC R3 1st leg		Keighley	5-0	Bradford Northern	Lawkholme Ln					
CC R3 2nd leg		Bradford Northern	35-3	Keighley	Odsal	35-8				
Final
CC F 1st leg	Sat 28-04-1945	Huddersfield	7–4	Bradford Northern	Fartown		9,041	£1,184.3.7		
CC F 2nd leg	Sat 05-05-1945	Bradford Northern	5-6	Huddersfield	Odsal	9-13	17,500	£2,050.0.0		
Huddersfield are winners of the Challenge Cup

In the Final of the Rugby league Challenge Cup, Huddersfield beat Bradford Northern 13-9 on aggregate over two legs in front of an aggregate crowd of 26,541.

=== Lancashire Cup ===
The Lancashire County Cup, suspended for season 1940–41 remained so for the rest of the war and again Wigan competed in the Yorkshire Cup.

=== Yorkshire Cup ===
In the Final of the Yorkshire County Cup, Halifax beat Hunslet in two low scoring legs by 14-3 on aggregate before an aggregate crowd of 20,800.

== Notes and comments ==
=== Note on the first peacetime league programme which would take place in 1945–46 ===
With the ending of the hostilities in Europe in May 1945 and the Far East in September 1945, a full league programme commences. All of the clubs who took part in the last peacetime competition in 1938-39 re-joined the league with the exceptions of :-

St Helens Recs – who folded before the war started.
Leigh – who had lost their ground and would not re-join for a further season until 1946–47

== See also ==
- British rugby league system
- 1939–40 Northern Rugby Football League Wartime Emergency League season
- 1940–41 Northern Rugby Football League Wartime Emergency League season
- 1941–42 Northern Rugby Football League Wartime Emergency League season
- 1942–43 Northern Rugby Football League Wartime Emergency League season
- 1943–44 Northern Rugby Football League Wartime Emergency League season
- 1944–45 Northern Rugby Football League Wartime Emergency League season
- The Great Schism – Rugby League View
- The Great Schism – Rugby Union View
- List of defunct rugby league clubs
- Dewsbury
