= 1941–42 Yorkshire Cup =

- Structure: Regional knockout championship
- Teams: 16
- Winners: Bradford Northern
- Runners-up: Halifax

The 1941–42 Yorkshire Cup was the thirty-fourth occasion on which the Yorkshire Cup competition had been held. Organised by the Rugby Football League (RFL), the Yorkshire Cup was a knock-out competition between the professional rugby league clubs from the county of Yorkshire. Under the wartime emergency rules the RFL was operating to, teams from Lancashire were invited to participate as the Lancashire Cup was not played. The Cup was played for by 14 teams from Yorkshire and two from Lancashire.

Played during October to December 1941 and comprised three two-legged rounds followed by the final. The final was played at Fartown, Huddersfield. Bradford Northern retained the trophy by beating Halifax 24–0 in front of a crowd of 5,989 with receipts were £635.

== Participation ==
In making plans for the 1941–42 season the RFL decided to move the dates of the competition back to the traditional playing period of autumn. In the previous season, the Lancashire Cup was abandoned and the few Lancashire clubs playing during the war were invited to play in the Yorkshire Cup instead, this invitation was continued for 1941–42. Wigan and Oldham of the three Lancashire teams playing during the season accepted the invite while St Helens declined to take part.

== Format ==
With 14 Yorkshire clubs and two Lancashire clubs in the draw, the format did not require any byes. The decision was made to play all ties, except the final, as two-legs (home and away). The competition was played over consecutive weeks, commencing on 25 October, with the final taking place on 6 December. All the fixtures for all three rounds of the competition were drawn at the same time.

== First round ==
The first leg ties were all played on Saturday 25 October 1941.

Yorkshire Cup: first round, first leg
Match ID	Home	Score	Away	Match Information
Match ID	Home	Score	Away	Date and Time	Venue
A	Leeds	3–8	Wakefield Trinity	25 October 1941, 3:30 pm	Headingley
B	Hull F.C.	3–20	Huddersfield	25 October 1941, 3:30 pm	The Boulevard
C	York	2–5	Oldham	25 October 1941, 3:30 pm	Clarence Street
D	Keighley	2–14	Wigan	25 October 1941, 3:30 pm	Lawkholme Lane
E	Castleford	18–2	Dewsbury	25 October 1941, 3:30 pm	Wheldon Road
F	Bradford Northern	6–28	Batley	25 October 1941, 3:30 pm	Odsal
G	Featherstone Rovers	7–18	Halifax	25 October 1941, 3:30 pm	Post Office Road
H	Hunslet	28–6	Bramley	25 October 1941, 3:30 pm	Parkside

The return legs were played the following weekend on Saturday 1 November 1941.

Yorkshire Cup: first round, second leg
Match ID	Home	Score	Away	Match Information
Match ID	Home	Score	Away	Date and Time	Venue	Aggregate score
A	Wakefield Trinity	4–5	Leeds	1 November 1941, 3:30 pm	Belle Vue	12–8
B	Huddersfield	5–13	Hull F.C.	1 November 1941, 3:30 pm	Fartown	25–16
C	Oldham	10–0	York	1 November 1941, 3:30 pm	Watersheddings	15–2
D	Wigan	19–0	Keighley	1 November 1941, 3:30 pm	Central Park	33–2
E	Dewsbury	8–5	Castleford	1 November 1941, 3:30 pm	Crown Flatt	10–23
F	Batley	36–0	Bradford	1 November 1941, 3:30 pm	Mount Pleasant	64–6
G	Halifax	16–5	Featherstone Rovers	1 November 1941, 3:30 pm	Thrum Hall	34–12
H	Bramley	3–34	Hunslet	1 November 1941, 3:30 pm	Barley Mow	9–62

== Second round ==
The first leg ties were all played on Saturday 8 November 1941.

Yorkshire Cup: second round, first leg
Match ID	Home	Score	Away	Match Information
Match ID	Home	Score	Away	Date and Time	Venue
G v A	Halifax	13–7	Wakefield Trinity	8 November 1941, 3:30 pm	Thrum Hall
H v D	Hunslet	3–8	Wigan	8 November 1941, 3:30 pm	Parkside
B v E	Huddersfield	14–6	Castleford	8 November 1941, 3:30 pm	Fartown
C v F	Oldham	0–10	Bradford Northern	8 November 1941, 3:30 pm	Watersheddings

Yorkshire Cup: second round, second leg
Match ID	Home	Score	Away	Match Information
Match ID	Home	Score	Away	Date and Time	Venue	Aggregate score
G v A	Wakefield Trinity	3–17	Halifax	15 November 1941, 3:30 pm	Belle Vue	10–27
H v D	Wigan	10–4	Hunslet	15 November 1941, 3:30 pm	Central Park	18–7
B v E	Castleford	6–5	Huddersfield	15 November 1941, 3:30 pm	Wheldon Road	12–19
C v F	Bradford Northern	5–9	Oldham	15 November 1941, 3:30 pm	Odsal	15–9

== Semi-finals ==
Yorkshire Cup: semi-finals, first leg
Match ID	Home	Score	Away	Match Information
Match ID	Home	Score	Away	Date and Time	Venue	Referee
G/A v H/D	Halifax	11–8	Wigan	22 November 1941, 3:30 pm	Thrum Hall	A.E.Harding
B/E v C/F	Huddersfield	11–10	Bradford Northern	22 November 1941, 3:30 pm	Fartown	J.E. Taylor

Yorkshire Cup: semi-finals, second leg
Match ID	Home	Score	Away	Match Information
Match ID	Home	Score	Away	Date and Time	Venue	Referee	Aggregate score
G/A v H/D	Wigan	2–2	Halifax	29 November 1941, 3:30 pm	Central Park	E. Devine	13–10
B/E v C/F	Bradford Northern	9–3	Huddersfield	29 November 1941, 3:30 pm	Odsal	A. Hill	19–14

== Final ==
8 December 1941
3:00 pm

Bradford Northern	24–0	Halifax
Tries: Davies (2), Best, Carter, Foster, Smith; Goals: Carmichael, E. Ward (2)

Fartown
Attendance: 5,979
Referee: G.S. Phillips

Team details
Bradford Northern		Position	Halifax
Name	Number	Position	Number	Name
Carmichael	1	Fullback	1	Lockwood
Best	2	Wing	2	Elias
Billington	3	Centre	3	Smith
E. Ward	4	Centre	4	Rule
Walters	5	Wing	5	Doyle
Davies	6	Stand off	6	Todd
D. Ward	7	Scrum half	7	McCue (Widnes)
Whitcombe	8	Prop forward	8	Baynham
Carter (Leeds)	9	Hooker	9	Meek
Higson	10	Prop forward	10	Irving
Foster	11	Second row	11	Millington (Widnes)
Smith	12	Second row	12	Brereton
Hutchinson	13	Loose forward	13	Dixon
Rees		Coach

On the Monday following the semi-finals, the cup committee met to decide the venue for the final. The decision made was to play the game at Huddersfield's Fartown Ground with Mr G.S. Phillips as referee. Kick-off time was scheduled for 3:00 pm to allow for extra-time of 10-minutes each way to be played, if needed, and the game still finish in daylight. If the scores were still level after 20-minutes of extra-time then the game would proceed as sudden death, with the first team to score being declared the winners.

The local rivals met in a game that journalists expected to be a close match.

With both teams featuring guest players, the first half was the close matched game expected and it was only shortly before half-time when the first points were scored as Bradford's Willie Davies made the most of a Halifax error to score a try. With the conversion being kicked, Bradford had a 5–0 lead at the interval.

The second half was a one-sided affair, Davies scored his second try from the first scrum of the half. This was followed by tries from Best, Carter, Foster and Smith with two conversions added. Although Halifax had a majority of possession in the second half, it was Bradford who did the attacking with Halifax once getting anywhere close to scoring.

The receipts for the final were £635.
