= 1940–41 Northern Rugby Football League Wartime Emergency League season =

- League: Northern Rugby League

1940–41 Season
- League Champions: Bradford Northern

Yorkshire competition
- Number of teams: 15
- Champions: Bradford Northern

Lancashire competition
- Number of teams: 12
- Champions: Wigan

The 1940–41 Northern Rugby Football Union season was the second season of the English rugby league’s Wartime Emergency League necessitated by the Second World War. After doubts that the season might not start, matches were played in a league organised in a similar way to the previous season with two regional leagues, Yorkshire and Lancashire, with the winners of each league meeting in a two-legged play-off final to determine the overall champions.

The Challenge Cup competition was re-introduced having been suspended in 1939–40 and the Yorkshire Cup was competed for but the Lancashire Cup competition was suspended.

The number of clubs participating in the league was down on the previous season, especially in Lancashire. The Yorkshire League was won by Bradford Northern who went on to retain their overall League Championship by beating Lancashire league winners Wigan in the play-off final. Leeds won the Challenge Cup while Bradford Northern won the Yorkshire Cup.

== Background ==
The 1939–40 season ended as the Battle of France was drawing to a close and the armed forces were planning the evacuation of British and French troops from Dunkirk. The Rugby Football League's (RFL) annual general meeting was held in Leeds on 12 June when the prospects of the war for the British were not good, the Dunkirk evacuation had finished, the German army was about to occupy Paris and the evacuation of the second British Expeditionary Force from Brittany was about to begin. At a very short RFL meeting the chairman, G. F. Hutchins, stated "it would be futile for the Rugby League to-day to attempt to come to any decision. All they could do was to mark time and await events." A. A. Bonner added "the Government may decide that it would be in the interests of the country for recreation to be provided for the people at home, but at the moment the prospects for football did not appear bright."

The league council met again in early August to review the situation and having been informed by the Ministry of Labour that sport to promote relaxation was encouraged, the decision was taken to play a league season on the same county lines as 1939–40. Each club had, prior to the meeting, been asked to decide if they would participate in the league. Two, Hull Kingston Rovers and Rochdale Hornets, gave notice that they would not be participating and several more had not yet made a decision by the date of the meeting. The meeting also deferred any decision on the playing of any cup competitions until 1941 and set payments for players at 25 shillings for a win or away draw and 15 shillings for a defeat or home draw. The clubs were given a deadline of 19 August to make a final decision on whether to compete in the league. At the next council meeting on 21 August all the Yorkshire clubs except Hull Kingston Rovers had confirmed their participation but two Lancashire clubs, Widnes and Barrow, joined Rochdale in withdrawing from the league. With only 23 clubs, 14 from Yorkshire and 9 from Lancashire, consideration was given to combining the two county leagues but the proposal was defeated. To add to the issues faced by the committee of the Lancashire county competition, Leigh confirmed that all their home games would have to be played away as their Mather Lane stadium was unavailable to the club. The playing of a nine-club Lancashire county league was agreed by the county committee on 28 August 1940 and preparations made for the new season to start on 7 September 1940.

== County competitions ==
=== Yorkshire competition ===
Each of the 14 teams was scheduled to play 26 games but only two clubs, Hull F.C. and Keighley managed to complete their schedules. The remaining clubs played between 20 and 25 games. Most commonly this was due to inability to raise enough players to fill the team. On other occasions teams were filled up using players from the other club as the guest system introduced the previous year was retained; this allowed a player to turn out for another club as long as the original club gave permission. An extreme example occurred on only the second week of the season when Batley travelled to Hull with only half a squad and no less than seven Hull players played for Batley.

The competition was won by Bradford Northern, retaining the title they won in the previous season.

==== Final table ====
Pos	Team	P	W	D	L	PF	PA	PD	Pts
1	Bradford Northern	25	23	1	1	469	126	343	47
2	Hull	26	20	0	6	341	227	114	40
3	Huddersfield	25	14	2	9	422	297	125	30
4	Leeds	25	14	1	10	372	235	137	29
5	Halifax	22	14	0	8	357	229	128	28
6	Hunslet	25	14	0	11	328	279	49	28
7	Featherstone Rovers	24	14	0	10	255	257	−2	28
8	Wakefield Trinity	23	12	0	11	237	214	23	24
9	Castleford	24	11	0	13	224	239	−15	22
10	Dewsbury	23	6	2	15	238	301	−63	14
11	Keighley	26	5	1	20	200	447	−247	11
12	Bramley	21	5	1	15	129	364	−235	11
13	York	23	5	0	18	227	388	−161	10
14	Batley	20	5	0	15	148	344	−196	10

=== Lancashire competition ===
With only nine teams competing the Lancashire competition was planned with each team playing 16 fixtures. When the competition ended in January 1941 only three teams, Oldham, Warrington and Wigan had played all their planned fixtures. The other six clubs had all failed to fulfil one or more fixtures. As in Yorkshire most unplayed games were due to the inability of one or other club to raise enough players; games were announced as not being played without comment, for example Broughton Rangers did not travel to Liverpool Stanley on 28 December, the local paper published the simple announcement "Broughton Rangers are unable to fulfil their engagement with Stanley at Prescot" on the morning of the game. Neither was the situation made any easier by problems with grounds, as well as Leigh having to play all their games away, Swinton were sharing the Willows with Salford, Broughton Rangers played all their home games as Stockport County's Edgeley Park and Liverpool Stanley were also playing at a soccer ground - Prescot Cables' Hope Street stadium.

Another factor in the number of games played were the decisions by Salford and Warrington to withdraw from the competition in January 1941. Salford announced on 1 January that the club was closing down until further notice while Warrington withdrew later the same month.

The competition was won by Wigan who went undefeated in the season, winning 15 games and drawing one. At the other end of the table and partly due to the unplayed fixtures both Broughton Rangers and Leigh failed to win a single game.

==== Final table ====
Pos	Team	P	W	D	L	PF	PA	PD	Pt
1	Wigan	16	15	1	0	297	71	226	31
2	Warrington	16	13	0	3	236	42	194	26
3	St. Helens	14	10	1	3	280	83	197	21
4	Salford	14	9	0	5	216	95	121	18
5	Oldham	16	6	1	9	161	205	−44	13
6	Swinton	13	6	0	7	121	132	−11	12
7	Liverpool Stanley	14	2	1	11	147	270	−123	5
8	Broughton Rangers	10	0	0	10	71	247	−176	0
9	Leigh	13	0	0	13	62	446	−384	0

== Championship play-off ==
The Championship was decided by a two-leg play-off between Wigan and Bradford Northern over the Easter weekend of 1941. Bradford won 45–15 on aggregate.

=== First leg ===
12 April 1941
3:30 pm BST (UTC+01:00)

Wigan	6 – 17	Bradford Northern
Tries: Jones, Lawrenson		Tries: Higson, Risman, Best, Walters (2); Goals: Ward

Central Park, Wigan
Attendance: 11,245
Referee: A.S. Dobson

Team details
Wigan		Position	Bradford Northern
Name	Number	Position	Number	Name
Jones	1	FB	1	Carmichael
Aspinall (Note: Guest players from Liverpool Stanley)	2	WG	2	Best
Lawrensen	3	CE	3	Winnard
Maloney	4	CE	4	Ward
Johnson	5	WG	5	Walters
Cunliffe	6	SO	6	Risman (Note: Guest player from Salford)
Bradshaw	7	SH	7	Hayes
Gee	8	PR	8	Whitcombe
Egan	9	HK	9	Carter (Note: Guest player from Leeds)
Curran (Note: Guest player from Salford)	10	PF	10	Higson
Cayzer (Note: Guest player from Hull Kingston Rovers)	11	SR	11	Smith
Bowen	12	SR	12	Foster
Simpson	13	LF	13	Moore

The first leg of the play-off took place at Wigan's Central Park, Wigan on Saturday 12 April 1941. Both teams included guest players, Salford being represented on both teams. Bradford dominated the first half with tries from Higson, Risman and Best; Ward converting one of the tries. The halt-time score was 11–0.

The second half was more even with both teams scoring two tries, Walters with two for Bradford and Jones and Lawrenson scoring for Wigan, making the final score 17–6 in Bradford's favour. The game was watched by 11,245 people and generated gate receipts of £640.

=== Second leg ===
14 April 1941
3:30 pm BST (UTC+01:00)

Bradford Northern	28 – 9	Wigan
Tries: Winnard (2), Risman (2), Walters, Moore; Goals: Ward (5)		Tries: Aspinall, Johnson, Bowen

Odsal Stadium, Bradford
Attendance: 20,205
Referee: P. Cowell

Team details
Bradford Northern		Position	Wigan
Name	Number	Position	Number	Name
Carmichael	1	FB	1	Jones
Best	2	WG	2	Aspinall (Note: Guest players from Liverpool Stanley)
Winnard	3	CE	3	Lawrensen
Ward	4	CE	4	Maloney
Walters	5	WG	5	Johnson
Risman (Note: Guest player from Salford)	6	SO	6	Cunliffe
Hayes	7	SH	7	Bradshaw
Higson	8	PR	8	Gee
Carter (Note: Guest player from Leeds)	9	HK	9	Egan
Whitcombe	10	PF	10	Curran (Note: Guest player from Salford)
Smith	11	SR	11	Sharatt
Foster	12	SR	12	Bowen
Moore	13	LF	13	Simpson

The second leg was played 48 hours after the first leg, on Easter Monday 14 April at Bradford's Odsal Stadium. The first half of the game was a much closer encounter than at Central Park and Bradford went in with a half-time lead 8–6 courtesy of tries from Winnard and Risman with a Ward conversion; Wigan had replied with tries by Aspinall and Johnson.

In the second half both hookers, Carter and Egan, were sent off and the resultant changes in the scrummage tipped the game in Bradford's favour and they scored a further four tries through Winnard, Risman, Moore and Walters with Ward kicking four more goals including a penalty; Bowen scored a try for Wigan. The final score was 28–9 to Bradford giving them a 30-point aggregate victory over the two legs. 20,205 people watched the game; the gate receipts totalling £1,148.

== Cup competitions ==
=== Challenge Cup ===
The Challenge Cup Competition was re-introduced after a season’s absence. At the August 1940 council meeting it was proposed the complete the league season, play the county cup competitions and then finish the season with the Challenge Cup. A decision on the structure of the Challenge Cup was deferred at the December meeting of the council but in January the dates for the competition were finalised. The competition was to be played on consecutive weekends commencing 12 April 1941, there would be three rounds then the four teams in the semi-finals would play on a home and away two-legged basis on the first two weekends in May 1941 with the final on a neutral venue on 17 May. Players were not allowed to play for more than one club in the competition and there were to be no replays. Extra time of 20 minutes was to be played and in the event of the scores still being level then the game would continue until one team scored. Medals would not be presented to the players in the final, instead war savings certificates (Note: War savings certificates had a face value of 15 shillings and attracted interest until they were worth 20s 6d after 10 years. The value of the prizes to the players was therefore £3 to the winning team's players and £2 5s to the members of the losing team.) were to be awarded, four to each player on the winning team and three to each player on the losing team.

Invitations to all clubs, even those who had not played in the league, were distributed in February 1941 and by the date of the draw 21 clubs had entered. The clubs who had not participated in the league all declined to enter the cup together with Salford and Warrington. So that clubs could make the necessary travel arrangements the first three rounds were all drawn on 26 March 1941; the first round consisting of five ties involving 10 clubs. The remaining 11 clubs were given a bye into the second round of eight matches.

The four semi-finalists were Leeds, Bradford, Wakefield Trinity and Halifax. Leeds beat Bradford 22–12 over two legs and Halifax beat Wakefield 16–12 on aggregate.

The final was played at Odsal Stadium, Bradford on Saturday 17 May where a crowd of 28,500 saw Leeds beat Halifax 19–2. Leeds led 5–2 at half-time through a penalty kicked by Eaton and a try by Jenkins with Halifax's Meek scoring a penalty. In the second half Leeds scored four more tries, two each by Hey and Lawrenson with Eaton converting one of the tries. The gate receipts totalled £1703, under the financial arrangements of the cup competition, after the deduction of match expenses and taxes the receipts were split with 50% going to the Rugby League and 25% each to the Leeds and Halifax clubs. Each club that took part in the competition received £42 10s 6d from the 20% of the pooled receipts of the earlier rounds of the competition.

=== Lancashire Cup ===
When planning for the season commenced the Lancashire committee had every intention of the Lancashire Cup competition being played, however when it came to make the draw for the first round in January 1941, the draw was deferred as only six clubs had confirmed their entry into the competition. On 4 February 1941 the committee cancelled the competition for the season as only three teams, Wigan, Leigh and Oldham were prepared to play.

=== Yorkshire Cup ===
In Yorkshire the playing of the Yorkshire Cup competition was confirmed in December 1940 with the competition to be played in March and April 1941. Following the decision of the Lancashire committee to abandon the Lancashire Cup competition, Wigan and Oldham applied to the Yorkshire committee to play in the Yorkshire Cup instead. This application was accepted and the two Lancashire clubs joined the 14 Yorkshire teams who had participated in the league in the competition.

Neither Lancashire team progressed past the first round as Wigan lost 9–3 to Leeds and Oldham went down 17–5 to Wakefield. The final was played between Bradford Northern and Dewsbury at Huddersfield's Fartown Ground on 5 April. Bradford won 15–5 in front of 13,316 spectators (gate receipts totalled £939) with two tries from Foster and one by Best and three kicked goals by Carmichael; Dewsbury's points came from a Sullivan penalty and a Tracey try.

== International match ==
A single international match was played when England beat Wales 8–5 at Oldham's Watersheddings ground on 9 November 1940. Although not reported at the time, the game was suspended during the first half due to an air raid warning; play did not continue until the all-clear was sounded.

== Sources ==
- Collins, Tony (2006). Rugby League in Twentieth Century Britain: A Social and Cultural History. Routledge. ISBN 978-0415396158.
- Osborne, J.A.C. (1956). "Part 1, Chapter VII, Committee on Small Savings" (PDF). In Allport, R.E.H. (ed.). War History of the Bank of England 1939/45. Bank of England.
- Fletcher, Raymond; Howes, David, eds. (1982). Rothmans Rugby League 1982–83 Yearbook. ISBN 0-907574-15-7.
- Fletcher, Raymond; Howes, David, eds. (1989). Rothmans Rugby League 1989–90 Yearbook. ISBN 0-356-17850-1.
- Saxton, Irvin, ed. (1985). History of Rugby League: No.46: 1940–41. Rugby Leaguer.
