= Charles Booth =

Charles Booth may refer to:

== Politics ==
- Charles Booth (diplomat) (1925–1997), British ambassador to Burma, 1978–1982
- Charles Erwin Booth (1840–1907), Republican member of the Wisconsin State Assembly
- Charles Stephen Booth (1897–1988), Canadian member of parliament, 1940–

== Sports ==
- Charles Booth (footballer) (1869–1898), English footballer
- Charlie Booth (1903–2008), Australian athlete credited for co-inventing starting blocks for sprinting races
- Charlie Booth (footballer) (1897–?), English footballer
- Charlie Booth (rugby league), English rugby league footballer of the 1930s, 1940s and 1950s

== Other ==
- Charles Booth (bishop) (died 1535), Tudor bishop of Hereford
- Charles O'Hara Booth (1800–1851), British commandant-in-chief of Port Arthur penal colony, Tasmania
- Charles Booth (social reformer) (1840–1916), British philanthropist
- Charles G. Booth (1896–1949), American writer of detective fiction

== See also ==
- Frederick Charles Booth (1890–1960), Victoria Cross winner
