= 1943–44 Northern Rugby Football League Wartime Emergency League season =

- League: Northern Rugby Football League Wartime Emergency League season

1943–44 Season
- Champions: Wigan
- League Leaders: Wakefield Trinity

The 1943–44 Northern Rugby Football Union season was the fifth season of the rugby league’s 'Wartime Emergency League necessitated by the Second World War.
As in the previous (fourth) Wartime season, the clubs each played a different number of games, but this season clubs re-joined the league and there were now 16 of the original clubs taking part in the Competition (but still only Oldham, St Helens and Wigan from west of the Pennines).
The League remained as one single amalgamated Championship.

== General Comments ==
=== Season summary ===
The 1943–44 season began on Saturday 4 September 1943.

As in the previous season, there are still only the three Lancashire clubs who have not had to close down and withdraw from the League. The Northern Rugby League continued with a single (now) 16 club single competition. As the clubs are still playing different number of marches, the league positions and the title would be decided on a percentage basis.

At the completion of the regular season Wakefield Trinity were on top of the league on both points and percentage success (with 38 points from 22 games and a percentage success of 86.36%), and Wigan were second (34 points from 21 games @ 80.95%). As of 2017, this is the only occasion that Wakefield Trinity have finished top of the league. Hunslet and Barrow finished a mid-table 8th and 9th respectively in their first season back after an earlier withdrawal. St Helens, for the second consecutive season, finished bottom (16th out of the 16 clubs) with only 1 wins from 21 and 2 points. Wigan beat Dewsbury 25-14 on aggregate in the two legged play-off final. and win the Championship (for the second consecutive season). The Wartime Emergency League did not count as an official league championship.

In the Final of the Rugby league Challenge Cup, Bradford Northern beat Wigan 8-3 on aggregate over two legs in front of an aggregate crowd of 52,000. The Lancashire County Cup, suspended for season 1940–41 remained so for the rest of the war and again Wigan competed in the Yorkshire Cup.

In the Final of the Yorkshire County Cup, Bradford Northern beat Keighley in two low scoring legs by 10-7 on aggregate before an aggregate crowd of 19,244.

=== Change in Club participation ===
==== Previous withdrawals ====
The following clubs had withdrawn from the League, before this 1943–44 season's completion began :-

St Helens Recs – who folded before the war started.
Hull Kingston Rovers – who withdrew after the end of the first (1939–40) season finished and did not rejoin until the 1945–46 season.
Rochdale Hornets – As Hull Kingston Rovers.
Widnes – As Hull Kingston Rovers.
Liverpool Stanley – withdrew after the end of the second 1940–41 season finished and did not rejoin until the 1945–46 season.
Salford – As Liverpool Stanley.
Swinton – As Liverpool Stanley.
Warrington – As Liverpool Stanley.
Broughton Rangers – withdrew early in the 1941–42 season and did not rejoin until the 1945–46 season.
Leigh - During the Second World War, the club was forced to leave its ground as the adjacent cable factory extended onto the land. The townsfolk of Leigh, acting on chairman James Hilton's inspiration, cleared some fields on the edge of the town, and built a new stadium, including moving and rebuilding the old grandstand from the original ground. In 1941–42, Leigh quit the wartime Lancashire league and would not return to the league until 1946–47 when they played as a temporary measure at the Athletic Ground, Holden Road before moving to Kirkhall Lane (which was later officially renamed Hilton Park after James Hilton).
Bramley – withdrew after the end of the third 1941–42 season finished and did not re-join until the 1945–46 season.
Castleford – withdrew after the end of the third 1941–42 season finished and did not participate for two seasons, re-joining for the 1944–45 season.

==== New withdrawals ====
There were no more new withdrawals

==== Clubs re-joining ====
Barrow – had withdrawn after the end of the first (1939–40) season finished. They had competed in the Challenge Cup competition at the end of last season and now re-joined for this 1944–45 season.
Hunslet – had withdrawn after the end of the third 1941–42 season finished, also, re-joining for this 1944–45 season.

===== Special Note =====
Dewsbury had a relatively successful time during the war years. Managed by Eddie Waring, and with the side boosted by the inclusion of a number of big-name guest players, the club won the Wartime Emergency League in 1941–42 and again the following season 1942–43 (though that championship was declared null and void when it was discovered they had played an ineligible player). They were also runners-up in the Championship in 1943–44, Challenge Cup winners in 1942–43 and Yorkshire Cup Final appearances in this season 1940–41 and winners in 1942–43.

== Championship ==
	Team	P	W	D	L	PF	PA	diff	%	Pts	Note	ref
1	Wakefield Trinity	22	19	0	3	359	97	262		38		
2	Wigan	21	17	0	4	302	141	161		34		
3	Hull	21	15	0	6	236	189	47		30		
4	Dewsbury	22	15	1	6	304	169	135		31		
5	Halifax	22	15	0	7	279	166	113		30		
6	Bradford Northern	19	11	1	7	292	125	167		23		
7	Leeds	21	12	1	8	262	252	10		25		
8	Hunslet	22	12	0	10	287	245	42		24		
9	Barrow	22	11	0	11	315	199	116		22		
10	Keighley	21	9	0	12	151	216	-65		18		
11	Huddersfield	21	7	1	13	223	230	-7		15		
12	Oldham	21	7	0	14	137	371	-234		14		
13	Featherstone Rovers	22	6	0	16	202	229	-27		12		
14	Batley	21	5	1	15	176	299	-123		11		
15	York	22	5	1	16	196	470	-274		11		
16	St. Helens	20	1	0	19	123	446	-323		2		

Heading abbreviations

RL = Single division; Pl = Games played; W = Win; D = Draw; L = Lose; PF = Points for; PA = Points against; Diff = Points difference (+ or -); Pts = League points
% Pts = A percentage system was used to determine league positions due to clubs playing varying number of fixtures and against different opponents
League points: for win = 2; for draw = 1; for loss = 0.

== Championship play-off ==
Championship play-off:

Semifinals:
- Wakefield Trinity 5 lost to Dewsbury 11 (Belle Vue)
- Wigan 27 beat Hull F.C. 10 (Central Park)
Final (two legs):
- Wigan 13 beat Dewsbury 9 (Central Park)
- Dewsbury 5 lost to Wigan 12 (Crown Flatt)
- Wigan won 25-14 on aggregate

== Trophies ==
=== Challenge Cup ===
The Challenge Cup Competition had been suspended for season 1939–40, but after being re-introduced for the following season 1940–41 continued again this season. Each round including the final was played in two legs on a home and away basis

In the Final of the Rugby league Challenge Cup, Bradford Northern beat Wigan 8-3 on aggregate over two legs in front of an aggregate crowd of 52,000.

=== Lancashire Cup ===
The Lancashire County Cup, suspended for season 1940–41 remained so for the rest of the war and again Wigan competed in the Yorkshire Cup.

=== Yorkshire Cup ===
Below are given some of the fixtures and results from this year’s Yorkshire Cup competition.

In the Final of the Yorkshire County Cup, Bradford Northern beat Keighley in two low scoring legs by 10-7 on aggregate before an aggregate crowd of 18,741.

== Notes and comments ==
1 - Keighley's highest wartime attendance
