= Emlyn Walters =

Wales international rugby league footballer

Personal information
- Full name: Emlyn Walters
- Born: 20 May 1918 Glynneath, Neath Port Talbot, Wales
- Died: 21 January 2001 (aged 82) Cwmgwrach, Wales

Playing information

Rugby union
Club
Years	Team	Pld	T	G	FG	P
1933–36	Glynneath RFC
1936–39	Pontypridd RFC
	Total	0	0	0	0	0

Rugby league
- Position: Wing
Club
Years	Team	Pld	T	G	FG	P
1939–51	Bradford Northern	276	173	0	0	519
1950–52	Hull FC
	Total	276	173	0	0	519
Representative
Years	Team	Pld	T	G	FG	P
1940–48	Wales	10	2	0	0	6
- Military career
- Allegiance: United Kingdom
- Branch: Royal Navy
- Service years: 1944-45
- Rank: Chief Petty Officer
- Conflicts: World War II

Emlyn Walters (20 May 1918 – 21 January 2001) was a Welsh rugby union, and professional rugby league footballer who played in the 1930s, 1940s and 1950s. He played club level rugby union (RU) for Glynneath RFC and Pontypridd RFC, and representative level rugby league (RL) for Wales, and at club level for Bradford Northern and Hull FC, as a wing.

== Background ==
Emlyn Walters was born in Glynneath, Merthyr Tydfil district, Wales, and he died aged 82 in Cwmgwrach, Wales.

== Playing career ==
Pontypridd RFC flyhalf Oliver Morris lodged at a house in Rosser Street, Maesycoed before he 'went North' and signed for Hunslet F.C. in November 1937, with team mate Emlyn Walters, who went on to Captain Pontypridd RFC from 1937 to 1939, before he too turned professional with Bradford Northern in July 1939. Walters was an outstanding player in the great Bradford Northern team of this era. His career was interrupted in 1944 when he was called up to the Royal Navy in the Second World War where he served as a Chief Petty Officer

=== International honours ===
Emlyn Walters won 10 caps for Wales (RL) in 1940–1948 while at Bradford Northern.

=== County Cup Final appearances ===
Emlyn Walters played on the wing in Bradford Northern's 15-5 victory over Dewsbury in the 1940–41 Yorkshire Cup Final during the 1940-41 season at Fartown Ground, Huddersfield on Saturday 5 April 1941, played on the wing in the 24-0 victory over Halifax in the 1941–42 Yorkshire Cup Final during the 1941-42 season at Fartown Ground, Huddersfield on Saturday 6 December 1941, and played on the wing in the 10-7 aggregate victory over Keighley in the 1943–44 Yorkshire Cup Final during the 1943-44 season, the 5-2 first-leg victory at Odsal Stadium, Bradford on Saturday 27 November 1943, and the 5-5 second-leg draw at Lawkholme Lane, Keighley on Saturday 4 December 1943.

=== Challenge Cup Final appearances ===
Emlyn Walters played in Bradford Northern's 8-3 aggregate victory over Wigan in the 1943–44 Challenge Cup Final during the 1943-44 season, absent from the 0-3 first-leg defeat at Central Park, Wigan on Saturday 15 April 1944, he played in the 8-0 second-leg victory at Odsal Stadium, Bradford on Saturday 22 April 1944, and played and scored the opening try in the 8-4 victory over Leeds in the 1946–47 Challenge Cup Final during the 1946-47 season at Wembley Stadium, London on Saturday 3 May 1947 in front of a crowd of 77,605.

=== Rugby Football League Championship ===
1939–40 Championship play-off final played over two legs, played in the first leg, against Swinton away won 21–13 home won 16–9. The 1940–41 Championship play-off Final against Wigan played in both legs away won 17–6 home won 28–9 away, scoring a try in the home and away ties. The 1941-42 Championship play-off Final against Dewsbury losing 0-13, at Headingley, Leeds.

=== Yorkshire League ===
Yorkshire League Winners 1939–40 and Yorkshire League Winners 1940–41

=== Testimonial match ===
Bradford Northern's home fixture with Dewsbury on Wednesday 12 May 1949 was Emlyn Walters Testimonial match which he shared with Willie Davies, this match was also their great friend and fellow Welshman Frank Whitcombe's last match for Bradford Northern, a crowd of 19,000 attended Odsal to witness the game
