= Alf Carmichael =

England international rugby league footballer

Personal information
- Full name: Alfred Carmichael
- Born: c. 1884 unknown
- Died: 30 September 1921 (aged 37) unknown

Playing information
- Position: Fullback
Club
Years	Team	Pld	T	G	FG	P
1901–14	Hull Kingston Rovers	339	12	727	0	1490
Representative
Years	Team	Pld	T	G	FG	P
1913	England	1	0	5	0	10
- Relatives: George Carmichael (son)

Alfred "Bunker" Carmichael (c. 1884 – 30 September 1921) was an English professional rugby league footballer who played in the 1900s and 1910s. He played at representative level for England, and at club level for Hull Kingston Rovers, as a goal-kicking fullback.

== Playing career ==
=== Club career ===
Carmichael made his debut for Hull Kingston Rovers in April 1901.

Alf Carmichael played fullback, and scored two goals in Hull Kingston Rovers' 10–22 defeat by Huddersfield in the 1911–12 Yorkshire Cup Final during the 1911–12 season at Belle Vue, Wakefield on Saturday 25 November 1911, in front of a crowd of 20,000.

He was the top point scorer for both the 1910–11 and 1911–12 seasons, and he still jointly holds Hull Kingston Rovers' "Goals In A Match" record, with 14 goals, along with Mike Fletcher, Colin Armstrong and Damien Couturier. He scored 10-conversions, and 4-drop goals against Merthyr Tydfil RLFC on Saturday 8 October 1910.

=== Representative honours ===
Carmichael won a cap for England while at Hull Kingston Rovers in 1913 against Wales.

== Personal life ==
Alf Carmichael was the father of the rugby league footballer; George Carmichael.
