= George Aspinall =

England international rugby league footballer (1923–2013)

Personal information
- Full name: George Albert Aspinall (Note: Aspinall's first name is stated as Gordon in some sources)

Playing information
- Position: Wing
Club
Years	Team	Pld	T	G	FG	P
≤1941–46	Liverpool Stanley
1946–47	Hunslet	19	5	0	0	45
1947–52	Salford	173	79	0	0	237
	Total	192	84	0	0	282
Representative
Years	Team	Pld	T	G	FG	P
1943	England	1	1	0	0	3
1946	Lancashire	1	0	0	0	0

George Albert Aspinall was an English professional rugby league footballer who played in the 1940s. He played at representative level for England, and at club level for Liverpool Stanley, as a wing.

== Playing career ==
=== Club career ===
During the Second World War, Aspinall guested for Wigan, and played in both legs of the 1940–41 Championship final defeat against Bradford Northern.

Aspinall was transferred from Liverpool Stanley to Hunslet in October 1946. He was transfer listed five months later, and signed with Salford.

=== International honours ===
Aspinall won a cap for England while at Liverpool Stanley in 1943 against Wales.
