= Jackie Bowen =

Wales international rugby league & union footballer (1915–2009)

Personal information
- Full name: Benjamin John Bowen
- Born: 25 March 1915; Llanelli, Wales
- Died: 26 February 2009 (aged 93); Wigan, England

Playing information

Rugby union
- Position: Forward
Club
Years	Team	Pld	T	G	FG	P
	Llanelli RFC

Rugby league
- Position: Forwards
Club
Years	Team	Pld	T	G	FG	P
1938–48	Wigan RLFC	147				112
1948–49	Leigh	30				21
	Total	177	0	0	0	133
Representative
Years	Team	Pld	T	G	FG	P
1945–48	Wales	2	0	0	0	0

Benjamin John Bowen (25 March 1915 – 26 February 2009) was a Welsh rugby union, and professional rugby league footballer who played in the 1930s and 1940s. He played club level rugby union (RU) for Llanelli, and representative rugby league for Wales, and at club level for Wigan, and Leigh (where he scored seven tries), and represented the Welsh league team.

== Background ==
Bowen was born Llanelli, Wales, he was the first ever landlord of The Wellfield Hotel public house in the middle of the then new Beech Hill housing estate in Wigan, and he died aged 93 in Wigan, Greater Manchester, England.

== Rugby career ==
Bowen first played first-class rugby for Llanelli, and was on the brink of winning his first cap for the Welsh union team when he switched to league. Bowen was a trialist in 1938 and managed to play in front of the selectors on the side of the 'Probables', but on leaving the field he was approached by officials from Wigan. The club offered him a ten-year contract, and when Bowen accepted he severed his links from the union code by becoming professional. Bowen changed rugby football codes from rugby union to rugby league when he transferred to Wigan, but with the outbreak of World War II he joined the British Armed Forces becoming a member of the Welsh Guards. Jackie Bowen played loose forward in Wigan's 10–7 victory over Salford in the 1938–39 Lancashire Cup Final during the 1938–39 season at Station Road, Swinton on Saturday 22 October 1938. After the war he returned to Wigan, and in 1945 he won his first international cap in a game against England.

Jackie Bowen played loose forward in Wigan's 13–9 victory over Dewsbury in the Championship Final first-leg during the 1943–44 season at Central Park, Wigan on Saturday 13 May 1944, and played loose forward in the 12–5 victory over Dewsbury in the Championship Final second-leg during the 1943–44 season at Crown Flatt, Dewsbury on Saturday 20 May 1944.

Although capped for Wales, he did not receive his actual cap until 2005 when he was awarded it during a half-time presentation on the pitch of the JJB Stadium in a match between Wigan and St. Helens.
