= Edgar Brooks =

England international rugby league footballer

Personal information
- Full name: Edgar Brooks
- Born: 1914 Oldham, Lancashire, England
- Died: 1986 (aged 71–72) Oldham, Greater Manchester, England

Playing information
- Position: Second-row
Club
Years	Team	Pld	T	G	FG	P
1933–51	Oldham	293	13	0	0	39
Representative
Years	Team	Pld	T	G	FG	P
1939–41	England	3	0	0	0	0

Edgar Brooks (1914 – 1986) was an English professional rugby league footballer who played in the 1930s, 1940s and 1950s. He played at representative level for England, and at club level for Oldham as a second-row.

== Background ==
Edgar Brooks was born in Oldham, Lancashire, England, and he died aged 71–72 in Oldham, Greater Manchester, England.

== International honours ==
Brooks won caps for England while at Oldham in 1939 against France, in 1940 against Wales, and in 1941 against Wales.
