= Charlie Booth (footballer) =

English footballer

Personal information
- Full name: Charles Booth
- Date of birth: 20 May 1897
- Place of birth: Glossop, England
- Height: 5 ft 5 3/4 in (1.67 m)
- Position: Right half

Senior career*
Years	Team	Apps	(Gls)
1914	Glossop	3	(0)
- * Club domestic league appearances and goals

Charles Booth was an English footballer who played in the Football League for Glossop as a right half.

== Personal life ==
In September 1916, over two years after the outbreak of the First World War, Booth enlisted in the Royal Navy. He served as a Stoker 1st Class on HMS Albion.

== Career statistics ==
Appearances and goals by club, season and competition
Club	Season	League			FA Cup		Total	
Club	Season	Division	Apps	Goals	Apps	Goals	Apps	Goals
Glossop	1914–15	Second Division	3	0	0	0	3	0
Career total			3	0	0	0	3	0
