= Frank Tracey =

England rugby league footballer (1918–1971)

Personal information
- Full name: Frank Tracey
- Born: 16 August 1918 St Helens, Merseyside, England
- Died: March 1971 (aged 52) St Helens, Merseyside, England

Playing information
- Position: Centre, Stand-off, Scrum-half
Club
Years	Team	Pld	T	G	FG	P
1939–47	St. Helens	80	30	0	0	90
1947	Wigan	6	1	0	0	3
	Total	86	31	0	0	93
Representative
Years	Team	Pld	T	G	FG	P
1939–40	England	2	0	0	0	0
1942	Rugby League XIII	1	0	0	0	0

Frank Tracey (1918–1971) was an English professional rugby league footballer who played in the 1930s and 1940s. He played at representative level for England, and at club level for St. Helens and Wigan, as a centre, stand-off, or scrum-half.

== Playing career ==
=== Representative honours ===
Tracey won caps for England while at St. Helens in 1939 against France, and in 1940 against Wales.

Tracey played stand-off for a Rugby League XIII against Northern Command XIII at Thrum Hall, Halifax on Saturday, 21 March 1942.
