= Jack Simpson (rugby league) =

Australian rugby league footballer

Personal information
- Full name: Byron John Joseph Simpson
- Born: 1917
- Died: 9 April 1944 (aged 26–27)

Playing information
- Position: Scrum-half
Club
Years	Team	Pld	T	G	FG	P
1936	St George	3	0	0	0	0
- As of 9 Jun 2021

Byron John Joseph Simpson (1917 – 9 April 1944) was an Australian rugby league footballer who played in the 1930s. He was killed in World War II.

== Career ==
A former schoolboy rugby player from St. Joseph's College, Jack Simpson played rugby league with St. George Dragons in 1936, playing a total of 3 first grade games.

== War service and death ==
Jack Simpson enlisted in the RAAF in 1942. On 9 April 1944, an Avro Lancaster took off from RAF Binbrook with 7 aboard, among them Flight Sergeant Simpson, serving as an air bomber on the flight. The bomber's objective was to lay mines in the Baltic Sea, but the Lancaster crashed six minutes after take-off, killing all aboard.
