= Syd Williams =

Wales dual-code international rugby footballer

Personal information
- Full name: Sydney Arthur Williams
- Born: 17 April 1918 Aberavon, Wales
- Died: 28 August 1976 (aged 58) Neath, Wales

Playing information

Rugby union
- Position: Wing
Club
Years	Team	Pld	T	G	FG	P
≤1939–39	Aberavon RFC
	Barbarian F.C.
	Total	0	0	0	0	0
Representative
Years	Team	Pld	T	G	FG	P
1939	Wales	3	0	0	0	0

Rugby league
- Position: Fullback, Wing, Centre
Club
Years	Team	Pld	T	G	FG	P
1939–52	Salford	222	81	43	0	329
1940(guest)	→ Wigan	1	0	0		0
1940(guest)	→ Oldham RLFC	1	0	0	0	0
	Total	224	81	43	0	329
Representative
Years	Team	Pld	T	G	FG	P
1940–52	Wales	5

Sydney Arthur Williams (17 April 1918 – 28 August 1976) was a Welsh dual-code international rugby union and professional rugby league footballer who played in the 1930s, 1940s and 1950s. He played representative level rugby union (RU) for Wales, and at club level for Aberavon RFC, as a wing, and representative level rugby league (RL) for Wales, and at club level for Salford, as a fullback, wing, or centre. He also appeared for Wigan and Oldham RLFC as a World War II guest player.

== Background ==
Williams was born in Aberavon, Wales, and he died aged 58 in Neath, Wales.

== International honours ==
Syd Williams won three caps for Wales (RU) while at Aberavon RFC in 1939 against England, Scotland, and Ireland, and won five caps for Wales (RL) while at Salford from 1940 to 1952.
