= John Kelly (rugby, born 1917) =

English rugby union & league footballer

Jack Kelly
Personal information
- Full name: John Kelly
- Born: 21 March 1917 Leeds, England
- Died: unknown unknown

Playing information

Rugby union
- Position: Fullback
Club
Years	Team	Pld	T	G	FG	P
≤1938–38	Bramley Old Boys RUFC

Rugby league
- Position: Fullback, Wing
Club
Years	Team	Pld	T	G	FG	P
1938–≥41	Leeds	83
1941–41	St. Helens	1	0	0	0	0
	Total	84	0	0	0	0
- Source: leedsrugby.dnsupdate.co.uk

John Kelly (21 March 1917 – death unknown) was an English rugby union and professional rugby league footballer who played in the 1930s and 1940s. He played club level rugby union (RU) for Bramley Old Boys RUFC, as a Fullback and club level rugby league (RL) for Leeds and St. Helens (one match when a man short) as a fullback, or wing.

== Leeds career ==
On Saturday 24 December 1938 Leeds played Salford at Headingley. However, because the rugby pitch was frozen, the match was switched to the cricket field. Vic Hey scored the only try of the match, and Jack Kelly became the only player to ever kick a goal on the cricket pitch in a 5–0 win. He spent most of his career at Leeds behind Charles "Charlie" Eaton for the fullback position, but he still managed to play in 83 matches, mainly during the Emergency Leagues throughout World War II. On Saturday 6 December 1941 Leeds played St. Helens at Headingley, the St. Helens team was a man short, so Jack Kelly played as a stand-in wing for them.

== Notes ==
Someone named Jack Kelly played rugby league for Wests and North Sydney during the 1920s and 1930s, and someone named J Kelly played rugby league for Newtown Bluebags during the 1940s; however, these footballers are unlikely to be this Jack Kelly.
