= David Davies (rugby league, born c. 1915) =

Wales international rugby league footballer

Dai Davies
Personal information
- Full name: David Melvyn Davies
- Born: c. 1915 Wales
- Died: unknown

Playing information
- Position: Prop, Second-row
Club
Years	Team	Pld	T	G	FG	P
1936–52	Salford	370	39	0	0	117
Representative
Years	Team	Pld	T	G	FG	P
1939–48	Wales	9	0	0	0	0

David "Dai" Melvyn Davies (c. 1915 – death unknown) was a Welsh professional rugby league footballer who played in the 1930s, 1940s and 1950s. He played at representative level for Wales, and at club level for Salford, as a prop or second-row.

== Playing career ==
Davies played rugby union for Talywain RFC before turning professional in 1936, joining English rugby league club Salford.

About Dai Davies' time, there was Salford's 5–2 victory over Wigan in the 1936 Lancashire Cup Final during the 1936–37 season at Wilderspool Stadium, Warrington on Saturday 17 October 1936, and played at prop in the 7–10 defeat by Wigan in the 1938 Lancashire Cup Final during the 1938–39 season at Station Road, Swinton on Saturday 22 October 1938.

Dai Davies played at prop in Salford's 7–4 victory over Barrow in the 1938 Challenge Cup Final during the 1937–38 season at Wembley Stadium, London, in front of a crowd of 51,243.

=== International honours ===
Davies won nine caps for Wales from 1939 to 1948 while at Salford.
