= Billy Hutchinson (rugby league) =

England international rugby league footballer

Personal information
- Full name: William Hutchinson
- Born: 13 October 1913 Bradford, England
- Died: 1 June 1994 (aged 80) Bradford, England

Playing information
- Position: Fullback, Prop, Second-row, Loose forward
Club
| Years | Team | Pld | T | G | FG | P |
|---|---|---|---|---|---|---|
| 1932–37 | Bradford Northern | 67 |
| 1941–47 | Bradford Northern | 146 | 26 |
| 1945 | → Featherstone Rovers (guest) | 2 | 2 | 0 | 0 | 6 |
| | Total | 215 | 28 | 0 | 0 | 6 |
Representative
| Years | Team | Pld | T | G | FG | P |
| 1944-45 | England | 2 | 0 | 0 | 0 | 0 |

William Hutchinson (13 October 1913 – 1 June 1994) was an English professional rugby league footballer who played in the 1930s and 1940s. He played at representative level for England, and at club level for Bradford Northern (two spells), and Featherstone Rovers (World War II guest), as a fullback, prop, second-row, or loose forward.

== Background ==
Billy Hutchinson was born in Bradford, West Riding of Yorkshire, England, and he died aged 80 in Bradford, West Yorkshire, England.

== Playing career ==
=== Club career ===
Hutchinson made his début for Featherstone Rovers on Saturday 10 February 1945.

=== International honours ===
Hutchinson won 2 caps for England while at Bradford Northern, he made his international début, and played at second-row in the 9-9 draw with Wales at Central Park, Wigan on Saturday 26 February 1944, and played loose forward in the 18-8 victory over Wales at Central Park, Wigan on Saturday 10 March 1945.
