= Charlie Booth (rugby league) =

England international rugby league footballer

Personal information
- Full name: Charles Booth
- Born: unknown
- Died: unknown

Playing information
- Position: Hooker, Second-row
Club
Years	Team	Pld	T	G	FG	P
1935–50	Hull FC
1942–43	→Oldham RLFC (guest)	6	0	0	0	0
	Total	6	0	0	0	0
Representative
Years	Team	Pld	T	G	FG	P
1937	British Empire	1	0	0	0	0
1938–39	England	3	0	0	0	0

Charles Booth (birth unknown – death unknown) was an English professional rugby league footballer who played in the 1930s and 1940s. He played at representative level for England and British Empire, and at club level for Hull FC, and Oldham RLFC as a WW2 guest player, as a hooker or second-row, and was captain of Hull during the 1945–46 season.

== Playing career ==
=== International honours ===
Charlie Booth represented British Empire while at Hull in 1937 against France, and won caps for England while at Hull in 1938 against Wales (2 matches), and in 1939 against Wales.

=== County Cup Final appearances ===
Charlie Booth played at second-row in Hull's 10-18 defeat by Huddersfield in the 1938–39 Yorkshire Cup Final during the 1938–39 season at Odsal Stadium, Bradford on Saturday 22 October 1938.

== Personal life ==
Charlie Booth had two sons, Charlie and Roger, who both played rugby league for Hull in the 1960s. Roger died in a plane crash in Canada in 1993, aged 48.
