= George Carmichael (rugby league) =

English rugby league footballer

- Ogden's Cigarette card featuring George Carmichael

Personal information
- Full name: George Carmichael
- Born: 9th Dec 1908; Hull, Yorkshire, England
- Died: 6 September 1985 (aged 76); Steeton, West Yorkshire, England

Playing information
- Position: Fullback
Club
Years	Team	Pld	T	G	FG	P
1928–34	Hull Kingston Rovers	180	17	288	0	627
1934–49	Bradford Northern	473	18	409	0	874
1943–44	→ Hull F.C. (guest)
	Total	653	35	697	0	1501
Representative
Years	Team	Pld	T	G	FG	P
1932–35	Yorkshire	4	0	7	0	14
- Source: As of 27 December 2024
- Father: Alf Carmichael

George Carmichael (birth unknown – death unknown) was an English professional rugby league footballer who played in the 1920s, 1930s and 1940s. He played at representative level for Yorkshire, and at club level for Hull Kingston Rovers, Bradford Northern and wartime guest at Hull FC, as a goal-kicking fullback.

== Playing career ==
=== Challenge Cup Final appearances ===
George Carmichael played in Bradford Northern's 8–4 victory over Leeds in the 1946–47 Challenge Cup Final during the 1946–47 season at Wembley Stadium, London on Saturday 3 May 1947.

=== County Cup Final appearances ===
George Carmichael played, and scored three goals in Bradford Northern's 15–5 victory over Dewsbury in the 1940–41 Yorkshire Cup Final during the 1940–41 season at Fartown Ground, Huddersfield on Saturday 5 April 1941, played and scored 1-goal in the 24–0 victory over Halifax in the 1941–42 Yorkshire Cup Final during the 1941–42 season at Fartown Ground, Huddersfield on Saturday 6 December 1941, played and scored 1-goal in the 5–2 victory over Wakefield Trinity in the 1945–46 Yorkshire Cup Final during the 1945–46 season at Thrum Hall, Halifax on Saturday 3 November 1945, and played in the 18–9 victory over Castleford in the 1948–49 Yorkshire Cup Final during the 1948–49 season at Headingley, Leeds on Saturday 30 October 1948.

=== Club career ===
George Carmichael was transferred from Hull Kingston Rovers to Bradford Northern on 11 December 1934, with 473 appearances, George Carmichael is second in Bradford Northern/Bradford Bulls all-time appearance list, Keith Mumby heads the list with 588 appearances.

== Personal life ==
George Carmichael was the son of the rugby league footballer; Alf Carmichael.
