= Jimmy Hilton =

England international rugby league footballer

James Hilton
Personal information
- Full name: James Henry Hilton
- Born: 14 October 1883 Leigh, England
- Died: 1943 (aged c. 59–60) Leigh, England

Playing information
- Height: 5 ft 2 in (1.57 m)
- Weight: 10 st 7 lb (67 kg)
- Position: Stand-off, Scrum-half
Club
Years	Team	Pld	T	G	FG	P
≤1905–05	Leigh	15
1905–12	Halifax	234	50	164	2	482
1912–13	Wigan	7	0	1		2
≥1913	Keighley
	Total	256	50	165	2	484
Representative
Years	Team	Pld	T	G	FG	P
1906–08	Yorkshire	4	0	3	0	6
1908–12	England	2	0	1	0	2

James Hilton (1883–1943) was an English professional rugby league footballer who played in the 1900s and 1910s. He played at representative level for England and Yorkshire (as a result of playing in the West Riding of Yorkshire, and despite being born in Lancashire), and at club level for Tyldesley Shamrocks ARLFC (not Tyldesley RLFC), Leigh, Halifax, Wigan, and Keighley, as a stand-off, or scrum-half.

== Background ==
Jimmy Hilton was born in Leigh, Lancashire, England, he was an iron mouldmaker, and he died aged c. 59–60 in Leigh, Lancashire, England.

== Playing career ==
=== Club career ===
Jimmy Hilton made his début for Halifax on Saturday 28 January 1905, and he played his last match for Halifax in the 5–8 defeat by Dewsbury in the 1912 Challenge Cup semi-final during the 1911–12 season on Saturday 13 April 1912, he was transferred to Wigan for £175 (based on inflation equivalent to £21,885 in 2023) (based on increases in average earnings approximately equivalent to £63,600 in 2016). he made his début for Wigan in 70–0 victory over Coventry RLFC at Central Park, Wigan on Wednesday 20 November 1912, and he played his last match for Wigan in the 2–14 defeat by Widnes at Lowerhouse Lane, Widnes on Saturday 22 March 1913.

=== Representative honours ===
Jimmy Hilton won caps for England while at Halifax in 1908 against Wales, and in 1912 against Wales.

Jimmy Hilton won caps for Yorkshire while at Halifax.
