= Jack Moore (rugby league) =

England international rugby league footballer

John Moore
Personal information
- Full name: John William Moore
- Died: 27 February 1942

Playing information
- Position: Loose forward
Club
Years	Team	Pld	T	G	FG	P
1935–41	Bradford Northern	188	19	0	0	57
Representative
Years	Team	Pld	T	G	FG	P
1940	England	1	1	0	0	3

John "Jack" Moore (unknown – 27 February 1942 ) was an English professional rugby league footballer who played in the 1930s and 1940s. He played at representative level for England, and at club level for Bradford Northern, as a loose forward.

== International honours ==
Jack Moore won a cap for England while at Bradford Northern in 1940 against Wales on Saturday 9 November at The Watersheddings (Oldham) the score was Wales 5 V England 8.

== Outside of Rugby League ==
Jack Moore was one of two Bradford Northern players to lose their lives in the World War II, the other being Charles Freeman, Moore was killed in action on Friday 27 February 1942 when his ship, HMS Electra, was sunk in the Battle of the Java Sea. His name is recorded on Panel 65, Column 3 at the Portsmouth Naval Memorial.
