= Tom Winnard =

England international rugby league footballer

- Ogden's Cigarette card featuring Thomas Winnard

Personal information
- Full name: Thomas Winnard
- Born: 1 September 1909
- Died: February 1986 (aged 76)

Playing information
- Position: Centre
Club
Years	Team	Pld	T	G	FG	P
≤1930–30	Wigan Highfield
1930–33	St. Helens	102	55	115		395
1933–44	Bradford Northern	259	168	281	1	1068
	Total	361	223	396	1	1463
Representative
Years	Team	Pld	T	G	FG	P
1933–38	Lancashire	3	1	1	0	5
1937	England	1	2	1	0	8

Thomas Winnard (1 September 1909 – February 1986) was an English professional rugby league footballer who played in the 1930s and 1940s. He played at representative level for England and Lancashire, and at club level for Wigan Highfield, St. Helens and Bradford Northern, as a centre.

== Playing career ==
=== Championship final appearances ===
Winnard played, and scored a try in St. Helens' 9–5 victory over Huddersfield in the Championship Final during the 1931–32 season at Belle Vue, Wakefield on Saturday 7 May 1932.

=== County League appearances ===
Winnard played in St. Helens' victories in the Lancashire League during the 1929-30 season and 1931-32 season.

=== International honours ===
Winnard won a cap for England while at Bradford Northern in 1937 against France at Thrum Hall, Halifax.

== Personal life ==
Tom Winnard was the father of the rugby league centre, second-row, and loose forward of the 1950s and 1960s for Bradford Northern; Ralph Winnard.
