= 1942–43 Northern Rugby Football League Wartime Emergency League season =

- League: Northern Rugby Football League Wartime Emergency League season

1942–43 Season
- Champions: Void
- League leaders: Wigan

The 1942–43 Northern Rugby Football Union season was the fourth season of the rugby league’s Wartime Emergency Leagues necessitated by the Second World War.

As in the previous wartime season, clubs did not all play the same number of games. Three clubs dropped out before the season started. Only 14 of the pre-war clubs participated with only three; Oldham, St Helens and Wigan from west of the Pennines.

== Season summary ==
The 1942–43 season began on Saturday 5 September 1942. As in the previous season, there were still only three Lancashire clubs, the Northern Rugby League continued with a single 14 club competition. As the clubs were playing different number of marches, the league positions were decided on a win percentage basis.

At the completion of the regular season Wigan were on top of the league with a percentage success of 81.25% and Dewsbury were second (78.12%). Although Bradford Northern won more games than anyone else their percentage success was only 73.80%, and consequently they finished third. St Helens finished last with only two wins from 15.

Dewsbury went on to defeat Halifax 33–16 on aggregate in the play-off final, however the Championship was declared null and void as the Dewsbury had fielded an ineligible player in the semi-final.

In the Rugby league Challenge Cup Final, Dewsbury beat Leeds 16–15 on aggregate over two legs in front of an aggregate crowd of 26,470.

== Change in participation ==
The RFL announced the fixture list at the end of July 1942 with 15 clubs entered. This was a reduction of two from the previous year as Bramley and Castleford had already notified the RFL of their intentions not to take part in the season. However before the season started, Hunslet's football committee announced their withdrawal due to the amount of travel required. The Hunslet committee's decision was contested by the members of the club who forced a special meeting of the club at which a resolution was passed instructing the committee to withdraw the notice given to the RFL, subject to additional financial guarantors being found. Meeting between prospective guarantors and the committee failed to reach agreement and Hunslet's withdrawal from the league stood, leaving the league with 14 clubs.

== Championship ==
Pos	Team	Pld	W	D	L	PF	PA	PAv	PCT
1	Wigan	16	13	0	3	301	141	2.135	81.25
2	Dewsbury	16	12	1	3	270	117	2.308	78.13
3	Bradford Northern	19	13	1	5	312	183	1.705	71.05
4	Halifax	19	13	0	6	297	149	1.993	68.42
5	Leeds	17	11	1	5	337	145	2.324	67.65
6	Huddersfield	18	12	0	6	215	189	1.138	66.67
7	Wakefield Trinity	19	11	1	7	267	192	1.391	60.53
8	Featherstone Rovers	19	10	1	8	179	138	1.297	55.26
9	Keighley	18	5	2	11	145	235	0.617	33.33
10	Batley	15	4	0	11	158	294	0.537	26.67
11	Hull	15	4	0	11	125	295	0.424	26.67
12	Oldham	19	4	0	15	142	306	0.464	21.05
13	York	17	3	1	13	112	311	0.360	20.59
14	St. Helens	15	2	0	13	108	273	0.396	13.33

== Championship play-offs ==
=== Qualifying game ===
On 1 May 1943 Bradford Northern beat Huddersfield 16–13 at Odsal Stadium, Bradford in the qualifying game.

=== Semi-finals ===
The semi-finals were played on 8 May 1943. Wigan lost 3–13 to Halifax at Central Park, Wigan. In the other game Bradford Northern beat Dewsbury 8–3 at Odsal. After the game Dewsbury submitted a protest to the Rugby Football League and Bradford Northern were disqualified for fielding an ineligible player.

=== Final ===
The first leg was played on 15 May 1943 Dewsbury beat Halifax 11–3 at Crown Flatt, Dewsbury.

The second leg was played the following Saturday, 22 May 1943 and Dewbury won again this time 22–13 at Thrum Hall, Halifax in front of a crowd of 9,700.

Dewsbury won 33–16 on aggregate but at a meeting of the RFL committee in July the championship was declared null and void. The committee heard a complaint submitted by Bradford Northern that in the semi-final between them and Dewsbury, Dewsbury had also fielded an ineligible player. The complaint was upheld, the championship was voided, Dewsbury's title win was removed from the list of Championship wins and the club were fined £100.

== Cup competitions ==
=== Challenge Cup ===
Barrow who had not entered the League programme, took part in this competition. In the final Dewsbury beat Leeds 16–15 on aggregate over two legs in front of an aggregate crowd of 26,470.

=== Yorkshire Cup ===
With the Lancashire Cup suspended for the duration of the war, Wigan competed in the Yorkshire Cup. The cup was won by Dewsbury who beat Huddersfield 7–2 on aggregate before an aggregate crowd of 17,252 in the two low scoring legs of the final
