= Leonard Higson =

England international rugby league footballer

Len Higson

Personal information
- Full name: Leonard Higson
- Born: 13 August 1908 Pontefract district, England
- Died: 1974 (aged 65) Bradford district, England

Playing information
- Position: Prop
Club
Years	Team	Pld	T	G	FG	P
1927–34	Wakefield Trinity	210	26	2	0	82
1934–35	Leeds	20	0	0	0	0
1935–47	Bradford Northern	386	25	0	0	75
	Total	616	51	2	0	157
Representative
Years	Team	Pld	T	G	FG	P
1929–34	Yorkshire	6	1	0	0	3
1932–41	England	2	0	0	0	0
- Father: John Higson

Leonard Higson (13 August 1908 – second ¼ 1974) was an English professional rugby league footballer who played in the 1920s, 1930s, and 1940s. He played at representative level for England and Yorkshire, and at club level for Wakefield Trinity, Leeds and Bradford Northern, as a prop.

== Background ==
Len Higson's birth was registered in Pontefract district, West Riding of Yorkshire, England, and his death aged 65 was registered in Bradford district, West Yorkshire, England.

== Playing career ==
=== County Cup Final appearances ===
Len Higson played at prop in Wakefield Trinity's 0-8 defeat by Leeds in the 1932–33 Yorkshire Cup Final during the 1932–33 season at Fartown Ground, Huddersfield on Saturday 19 November 1932.

=== Notable tour matches ===
Len Higson played at prop in Wakefield Trinity's 6-17 defeat by Australia in the 1933–34 Kangaroo tour of Great Britain match during the 1933–34 season at Belle Vue, Wakefield on Saturday 28 October 1933.

=== Club career ===
Len Higson made his début for Wakefield Trinity during November 1927.

=== Representative honours ===
Higson won caps for England while at Wakefield Trinity in 1932 against Wales, and while at Bradford Northern in 1941 against Wales.

Higson won cap(s) for Yorkshire while at Wakefield Trinity.

== Personal life ==
Len Higson was the son of the rugby league footballer John Higson.
