= List of Halifax R.L.F.C. players =

Halifax (known as the Halifax Blue Sox between 1996 and 2002) is an English rugby league club who have had numerous notable players (1,362 as of 31 October 2018) throughout their history, each player of the rugby league era who has played (and so excludes non-playing substitutes) in a competitive first-class match (including those matches that were subsequently abandoned, expunged or re-played, but excluding friendlies) has been allocated a sequential heritage number in order of their appearance by Halifax.

== List of players ==
№	Name	Position	Records/Notes
592	Alvin Ackerley	hooker	
890	Alan Ackroyd	Prop	‡
192	Albert Akroyd		
92	H. Akroyd		
845	Billy Adams		
344	F. T. "Fred" "Hefty" Adams	wing	1930–31 Challenge Cup winner (4-goals)
1311	Luke Adamson	Loose forward	17 November 1987 (age 38) ‡ ±
898	Malcolm Agar	Centre	‡
173	A. Ainley		
1283	Makali Aizue	Prop	30 December 1977 (age 48) ‡ ±
98	T. Albon		
97	Walt Albon		
208	Ernest Alder		
85	A. Ambler		
1302	Luke Ambler	Prop	18 December 1989 (age 36) ‡ ±
1083	Asa Amone	Wing	8 January 1966 (age 60) ‡
756	Barry Anderson		
941	Chris Anderson	Centre, Stand-off	28 May 1952 (age 74) ‡
1061	Grant Anderson		21 February 1969 (age 57) ‡
1055	Paul Anderson		25 October 1971 (age 55) ‡ ±
934	Tony Anderson	Wing	‡
1105	Éric Anselme		20 May 1978 (age 48) ‡ ±
825	Richard Appleyard	birthdate 1943	died 23 December 2018
374	Raymond Arber		
608	Douglas Armitage		
501	Tommy Armitt		
938	Bob Arnold	Second-row	‡
1187	Danny Arnold	Fullback	15 April 1977 (age 49) ‡ ±
6	Joey Arnold		
1300	Craig Ashall	Hooker, Loose forward	26 September 1985 (age 41) ‡ ±
1310	Karl Ashall		3 November 1989 (age 36) ‡ ±
220	John Harold Ashburn		
884	Dennis Ashman		
679	Ron Asquith		
840	Peter Astbury		
141	Fred Atkins		
1001	Gary Atkins		
348	Albert Atkinson		
994	Colin Atkinson		‡
1185	Brad Attwood	Fullback	24 November 1984 (age 41) ‡
1013	Greg Austin	Centre	14 June 1963 (age 63) ‡
140	Haley Backhouse		
972	Jimmy Bailey		‡
1038	Mark Mark		5 May 1968 (age 58) ‡
474	Ron Bailey		
738	Gordon Baker		‡
1066	Simon Baldwin	Second-row, Loose forward	31 March 1975 (age 51) ‡
357	Stanley Baldwion		
1215	Damian Ball	Second-row, Loose forward	‡ ±
823	Peter Banner		
1279	Stephen Bannister	Second-row	18 October 1987 (age 39) ‡ ±
1335	Ed Barber	Centre, Second-row	26 April 1990 (age 36) ‡ ±
1016	x Andy Barker		
1271	Dwayne Barker	Centre	Centre 21 September 1984 (age 42) ‡ ±
35	E. Barker		
1289	Josh Barlow		15 May 1991 (age 35) ‡ ±
1230	Mark Barlow	Wing	16 February 1984 (age 42) ‡ ±
1285	Sam Barlow	Loose forward	17 March 1988 (age 38) ‡ ±
1121	Danny Barnes	Hooker	‡
20	Jack Barnes		
826	Tony Barnes		
214	Fred Barron		
530	… Barry		
785	Bernard Barstow		
79	Irvine "Ike" Bartle		
774	Peter Bartlett		
456	Arthur Bassett		
1092	David Bastian		9 February 1978 (age 48) ‡
575	J. Bateman		
168	Percy Bateman		
1195	David Bates		23 October 1980 (age 46) ‡ ±
400	George Baynham		
226	Jack Beames		
308	Jack Beattie		
156	F. Beaumont		
1159	Robbie Beckett	Wing	14 August 1972 (age 54) ‡ ±
306	Harold Beeby		
896	Ben Beevers	Prop, Second-row	‡ ‡
964	Peter Bell	Second-row	‡
193	W. Bell		
933	Martin Bella		26 March 1964 (age 62) ‡ Should the following "Martin Bell" statistics actually be attributed to Martin Bella ‡
tbc	Gavin Bennion	Prop	31 December 1993 (age 32) ‡ ±
354	Nat Bentham		
1041	John Bentley	Wing	5 September 1966 (age 60) ‡
920	Lindsay Bentley	Hooker	‡
339	W. Berry		
516	J. T. Bery		
541	Walter Best		
1269	Bob Beswick	Stand-off, Hooker, Loose forward	8 December 1984 (age 41) ‡ ±
652	Dai Royston Bevan		
438	Jim Bevan		
445	Harry Beverley		
1258	Janan Billings		±
478	W. "Hooky" Birch		
62	William Birch		
1164	Chris Birchall	Prop	25 March 1986 (age 40) ‡ ±
614	Frank Birkin		
432	Fred Birmingham		
849	Jimmy Birts	Fullback	‡
129	F. Birtwhistle		
1039	Paul Bishop		5 July 1967 (age 59) ‡
1206	Ben Black	Scrum-half	29 April 1981 (age 45) ‡ ±
841	Mick Blacker	Fullback, Stand-off, Loose forward	‡
212	Jacobus H. Blackmore		
1211	Anthony Blackwood	Centre	13 September 1982 (age 44) ‡ ±
882	Johnnie Blair		‡
367	Harry Bland		
520	Selwyn Bland		
590	Selwyn Bland		
1111	Jamie Bloem	Fullback, Wing, Centre, Hooker, Second-row, Loose forward	26 May 1971 (age 55) ‡ ±
325	Wilfrid Blower		
383	A. Bolton		
899	Steve Bond	Second-row, Loose forward	‡
434	Fred Bone		c. 1925 ex-Redruth R.F.C. scrum-half (RU))
824	Joe Bonnar		
786	Stephen Booth		
1214	Steve Booth		not associated with Halifax on rugbyleagueproject.org, or on loverugbyleague.com?
243	Thomas Booth		
563	Walter Booth		
1102	Alan Boothroyd		19 June 1966 (age 60) ‡ ±
1204	Andy Boothroyd		‡ ±
777	Roy Borthwick		
1248	Matthew Bottom		not associated with Halifax on rugbyleagueproject.org, or on loverugbyleague.com?
7	Harry Bottomley		
1208	Jason Boults	Prop	7 September 1983 (age 43) ‡ ±
1099	David Bouveng	Wing, Centre	6 February 1973 (age 53) ‡
1252	Jamie Bovill		±
636	Gwilym Bowen		from Swansea RFC in 1951–52 for £850, loan to Castleford in 1953–54,
1232	Radney Bowker		±
274	Alec Bowman		
1264	Andy Bowman	Scrum-half, Loose forward	18 March 1992 (age 34) ‡ ±
1276	Anthony Bowman		±
1054	David Boyd		13 May 1966 (age 60) ‡
1341	Clément Boyer		±
tbc	Ryan Boyle	Prop	17 October 1987 (age 39) ‡ ±
1308	Andy Bracek	Prop, Loose forward	21 March 1984 (age 42) ‡ ±
621	Dennis Bradley		
1224	Dominic Brambani		10 May 1985 (age 41) ‡ ±
1280	Luke Branighan	Stand-off	29 June 1981 (age 45) ‡ ±
632	Keith Bray		
126	Joseph Brearley		
778	Mick Brennan		
928	Peter Brennan		
462	Chris Brereton		
1095	Johnny Brewer		14 February 1972 (age 54) ‡
36	E. Brier		
658	Peter "Billy" Briers		
1080	Carl Briggs		27 September 1974 (age 52) ‡ ±
809	David Briggs		
337	Herbert Briggs		
358	Jackie Bright		
425	Frederick Brindle		
219	Clifford Broadbent		
526	Jack Broadbent		
712	John Broadbent		
1115	Paul Broadbent	Prop	24 May 1968 (age 58) ‡ ±
421	Harry Broadhead		
631	Frank Broadhurst		
1156	Andrew Brocklehurst	Second-row, Loose forward	6 March 1983 (age 43) ‡ ±
433	Fred Brook		
822	Gary Brook		
265	John Brook		
1035	Mark Brooke-Cowden		‡
1322	Sam Brooks		±
174	Francis Broughton		
107	Albert Brown		
1328	Alex Brown	Wing, Scrum-half	28 August 1987 (age 39) ‡ ±
948	Cliff Brown		‡
332	Fred Brown		
519	George Brown		
225	James W. Brown		
380	Lou Brown		
723	Mike Brown		c. 1963/64 from South Africa (rugby union?)
1021	Peter Brown		1 September 1961 (age 65) ‡
1316	Simon Brown		±
787	Stephen Brown		
611	C. Budd		
105	J. William "Billy" Bulmer		
509	George Bunter		
1205	James Bunyan	Centre	2 November 1977 (age 48) ‡ ±
282	Stanley Burford		
195	Oliver Burgham		
353	R. Burkett		
762	Malcolm Burks		
656	John Burnett		
128	Foster Burnip		
388	Kip Burrows		
772	Bruce Burton		
1070	Danny Burton		‡
871	David Busfield	Second-row, Loose forward	22 November 1947 (age 78) ‡
tbc	Chester Butler	Wing, Centre	10 March 1995 (age 31) ‡ ±
53	Ernest Butterworth		
1329	Mitch Cahalane	Prop, Second-row	5 May 1989 (age 37) ‡ ±
413	Bob Caley		
538	Cyril Callighan		
653	Eric Callighan		
779	Dave Callon	Prop, Second-row	(Testimonial match 1981)‡
834	John Campbell		
1193	Phil Cantillon	Hooker	2 June 1976 (age 50) ‡ ±
1116	Daryl Cardiss	Fullback, Wing, Stand-off, Scrum-half	13 July 1978 (age 48) ‡ ±
1158	Dale Cardoza	Wing, Centre	13 September 1979 (age 47) ‡ ±
801	x Paul Carlin		
842	Stuart Carlton		
533	Bernard Carroll		
1000	Jason Carroll		
923	John Carroll		‡
587	W. Carter		
452	J. Aubrey Casewell		
1303	Callum Casey	Hooker	6 June 1990 (age 36) ‡ ±
495	… Cattlin		
909	Garry Cawood	Stand-off	‡
431	Ernest Cecil		
926	Mario Cerchione	Fullback	‡
213	Joe Chadbourne		
372	Harry Chadwick		
455	John Chadwick		
555	Dennis Chalkley		
1287	Joe Chandler		2 November 1988 (age 37) ‡ ±
178	Arthur Chapman		
37	H. Chapman		
1169	Jaymes Chapman	Prop, Second-row	17 December 1983 (age 42) ‡ ±
493	Jim Chappell		
875	Mel Charles		
1275	Graham Charlesworth		±
1270	Neil Cherryholme	Prop	20 December 1986 (age 39) ‡ ±
1087	Chris Chester	Stand-off, Scrum-half, Loose forward	8 October 1978 (age 48) ‡
249	Herbert W. Lumb		
426	Arthur Childs		
846	David Cholmondeley	Centre	25 July 1954 (age 72) ‡
8	Alf Chorley		
1109	Des Clark	Second-row	4 March 1972 (age 54) ‡
489	… Clarke		
1096	Greg Clarke		31 May 1973 (age 53) ‡
637	Des Clarkson	Second-row	c. 1954
1148	Ryan Clayton	Centre, Second-row, Loose forward	22 November 1982 (age 43) ‡ ±
262	Archie Clegg		
677	Colin Clifft		
1107	Gavin Clinch	Stand-off, Scrum-half	13 September 1974 (age 52) ‡
573	John Clinton		
1233	John Clough		±
55	Jack P. Clowes		1888 British Isles tourist (RU)
157	Albert Cockroft		
236	Green Coldwell		
100	S. Coldwell		
75	A. Collett		
643	Jack Collinson		
593	Michael Condon		
1069	Ian Connor		21 March 1970 (age 56) ‡
886	Steve Conway	Centre	‡
625	Terence "Terry" Cook		
89	F. Cookson		
741	Barrie Cooper		
1037	David Cooper		‡
283	William Cooper		
1176	Ged Corcoran	Second-row	28 March 1983 (age 43) ‡ ±
1183	Wayne Corcoran	Stand-off, Loose forward	10 July 1985 (age 41) ‡ ±
42	Harry Costello		
161	Jack Cottam		
150	George Cottrell		
399	Jack Coulson		
673	Gowan Coulthard		
1320	Danny Cowling	Centre	7 December 1991 (age 34) ‡ ±
597	Frank Cox		
396	Jack Cox		
1340	Jordan Cox		±
1262	Thomas Coyle		±
987	Peter Coyne		28 October 1964 (age 61) ‡
172	John Crabtree		
698	Roger Crabtree		
364	Shirley Crabtree Sr.		c. 1931, father of Shirley Crabtree (Big Daddy), grandfather of Eorl Crabtree
1117	Andrew "Andy" Craig	Centre	16 March 1976 (age 50) ‡
1334	Danny Craven		±
559	David Craven		
754	Ian Crawshaw		
638	Martin Creeney		
704	Ernie Critchley		
609	Les Croft		
320	Arthur Crossley		
221	Horace Crossley		
30	Jack Crossley		
957	John Crossley Jr.		‡
1173	Heath Cruckshank	Second-row	28 June 1976 (age 50) ‡ ±
tbc	Chris Cullimore		‡ ±
394	Jack Cutbrush		
525	… Dagnall		
724	Paul Daley		
815	John Dalgreen		‡
546	Arthur Daniels		
414	Ellis Daniels		
1151	Paul Davidson	Prop, Second-row	1 August 1970 (age 56) ‡
531	… Davies		
1314	Ben Davies		2 November 1989 (age 36) ‡ ±
198	Bert Davies		
402	Cai Davies		
197	Dai Davies		
1306	Iain Davies		±
379	Ivor Davies		
553	John Davies		
775	Phil Davies		
322	Roy "Dick" Davies		
187	Will T. Davies		
811	x Dickie Dawson		
15	W. Dawson		
459	Ernest Day		
1071	Craig Dean	Scrum-half	20 October 1966 (age 60) ‡ ±
602	Ken Dean		
144	Charlie Denham		
466	George Dennis		
807	Trevor Denton		
108	Arthur Devitt		
745	Terry Dewhirst		
68	Tom Dewhirst		
996	Kevin Dick		‡
558	A. Dickinson		
905	Andrew Dickinson		‡
17	George Dickinson		
285	George Dickinson		
963	Roy Dickinson		21 October 1956 (age 70) ‡
1336	Tyler Dickinson		±
1040	Gary Divorty	Loose forward	28 January 1966 (age 60) ‡
1304	Ross Divorty	Second-row	27 November 1988 (age 37) ‡ ±
716	Colin Dixon		
447	Jack Dixon		
950	Paul Dixon	Second-row	28 October 1962 (age 63) ‡
971	David Dobek		4 October 1966 (age 60) ‡
726	David Dobson		
802	Ronnie Dobson		
480	Alec Dockar		
554	Walter Dockar		
1152	Stuart Donlan	Fullback, Centre	29 August 1978 (age 48) ‡ ±
1172	Dane Dorahy	Fullback, Stand-off, Scrum-half	17 December 1977 (age 48) ‡ ±
997	John Dorahy		28 August 1954 (age 72) ‡
tbc	Brandon Douglas		‡ ±
313	Jimmie Douglas		
832	Stuart Downey		
464	Albert E. Doyle		
133	W. Drummond		
1291	Gil Dudson		±
722	Hugh Duffy		
1126	Andrew Dunneman	Stand-off, Scrum-half, Loose forward	6 October 1976 (age 50) ‡ ±
598	Ronald Cecil Durston		
804	David Dyson		
965	Graham Eadie	Fullback	25 November 1953 (age 72) ‡
28	Harry Eastwood		
743	Rodney Eastwood		(from Wakefield RFC)
29	Wright Eastwood		
503	Charlie Eaton		
147	Percy Eccles		
1337	Jake Eccleston	Wing, Centre	24 April 1995 (age 31) ‡ ±
710	Frank Eckersley		
1064	Phil Eden		13 December 1963 (age 62) ‡
810	Steve Edmonds		
469	Alan Edwards		
12	W. Egerton		
1154	Danny Ekis		17 January 1982 (age 44) ‡ ±
1082	Abi Ekoku		13 April 1966 (age 60) ‡
1014	Mark Elia	Centre	25 December 1962 (age 63) ‡
450	Glyn Elias		
349	George Ellis		
1088	St. John Ellis		3 October 1964 ‡ ±
1135	Danny Ellison	Wing	16 December 1972 (age 53) ‡
185	Percy Emmett		
205	R. "Bob" Emmett		
876	x Ray Endicott		
52	J. England		
500	Alan H. Evans		
311	Arthur "Candy" Evans		
381	Dai W. Evans		
894	Graham Evans	Centre	‡
241	Hew Evans		
858	Howard Evans		
423	William Evans		
240	John Linton Ewart		
690	Dave Fairbank		
959	Dick Fairbank	Prop	‡
405	Frank Fairbank		
1288	Jacob Fairbank	Prop, Loose forward	4 March 1990 (age 36) ‡ ±
1263	James Fairbank		is this Jack Fairbank? ±
238	Jack Fairfax		
66	Bob Falcon		
617	Lew Falcon		
171	Tom Farrar		
1192	Anthony Farrell	Prop	17 January 1969 (age 57) ‡ ±
713	Keith Fazackerley		
663	Peter Fearis		
626	Albert Fearnley		
749	Stanley Fearnley		
67	T. Fearnley		
1120	Danny Fearon	Second-row, Loose forward	‡ ±
342	G. Fearon		
561	Sanderson Fearon		
1201	Ben Feehan		±
893	Trevor Feeney	Fullback	‡
768	Ted Ferguson		
829	Brian Field		
446	Harry Field		
1031	John Fieldhouse	Prop	28 June 1962 (age 64) ‡
1290	Ryan Fieldhouse	Fullback	10 April 1988 (age 38) ‡ ±
970	Brendan Finn		‡
1166	Liam Finn	Stand-off, Scrum-half, Loose forward	2 November 1983 (age 42) ‡ ±
814	David Finnerty		
1170	Lee Finnerty	Fullback, Wing, Centre	30 April 1978 (age 48) ‡
660	Brian Firth		
16	Frederick Firth		
1140	Matt Firth	Stand-off, Scrum-half, Hooker	‡ ±
1207	Ben Fisher	Hooker	4 February 1981 (age 45) ‡ ±
41	Mark Flackhart		
1266	Mark Flanagan		±
351	Frank Fletcher		
346	Herbert Fletcher		
50	Otis Fletcher		
1130	Greg Florimo	Centre, Stand-off, Loose forward	17 May 1967 (age 59) ‡
566	Alan Flowers		
1163	Jason Flowers	Fullback, Centre	30 January 1975 (age 51) ‡ ±
1030	Adam Fogerty		6 March 1969 (age 57) ‡
714	Terry Fogerty		
56	C. Foley		
514	Mick Foley		
440	William Forrest		
1137	David Foster	Hooker, Second-row	‡ ±
860	Neil Foster		
442	Norman Foster		
336	Edgar Fowler		
703	Frank Fox		c. 1963/64
1324	Peter Fox		±
750	Ian Foye		
795	Mick Frain		
122	Lewis France		
1024	Norman Francis		
665	John "Johnny" Freeman		
1175	Andrew Frew	Wing, Centre	9 March 1975 (age 51) ‡ ±
382	Ivor Frowen		
167	Dai Furnish		
751	Jack Gamble		
1124	Jim Gannon	Prop, Second-row	16 June 1977 (age 49) ‡ ±
897	Dave Garbett		‡
508	Joe Gardiner		
443	Jackie Gardner		
231	Clem Garforth		
881	Tony Garforth	Prop, Second-row	‡
868	Graham Garrod	Centre, Stand-off	‡
289	Harold Garside		
27	Lewis Garside		
409	Albert Gascoigne		
276	Harold Gaukroger		
360	Alf Gelder		
1281	Stanley Gene		±
454	Bernard George		
1231	Marcus George	Wing	‡
961	Wilf George	Wing	‡
1106	Damian Gibson	Fullback, Wing, Centre, Stand-off, Scrum-half	14 May 1975 (age 51) ‡ ±
235	Tom Gibson		
765	Paul Giedziun		
734	Eddie Gill		
314	Freddie Gill		
363	Jimmy Gill		
1072	Carl Gillespie	Prop, Second-row	25 July 1970 (age 56) ‡
700	Alex Givvons Jr.		
504	Alex Givvons		
123	Arthur Gledhill		
340	Arthur Gledhill		
259	Joe Gledhill		
1267	Mark Gleeson	Hooker	16 June 1982 (age 44) ‡ ±
1253	Jon Goddard	Centre	‡ ±
1129	Marvin Golden	Wing, Centre	21 December 1976 (age 49) ‡ ±
1131	Brett Goldspink	Prop, Second-row	16 July 1970 (age 56) ‡ ±
927	Adrian Goodall		
444	Jack Goodall		
747	Peter Goodchild		
1305	Mark Goodman		±
907	Neil Goodwin	Prop	‡
273	W. Herbert Goosey		
1256	Andy Gorski		±
914	John Gorton	Fullback	‡
1240	Mike Govin	Hooker	5 November 1984 (age 41) ‡ ±
tbc	Shane Grady	Second-row	13 December 1989 (age 36) ‡ ±
266	Jack Graham		
473	Tom Grahame		
467	G. Gray		
576	Jimmy Graydon		
847	Neil Grayshon		
463	… Greaves		
577	Allan Green		
557	George Green		
33	J. Green		
43	A. Greenwood		
498	Bill Greenwood		
1090	Brandon Greenwood		28 April 1972 (age 54) ‡
916	Brett Greenwood	Second-row	‡
113	Edgar Greenwood		
1168	Gareth Greenwood	Hooker	14 January 1983 (age 43) ‡ ±
57	H. Greenwood		
570	Harry Greenwood		
211	Jimmy Greenwood		
820	Lee Greenwood	Wing, Centre	is this the same Lee Greenwood (Keighley)‡
1143	Lee Greenwood		28 September 1980 (age 46) ‡ ±
1259	Miles Greenwood	Fullback, Wing	30 July 1987 (age 39) ‡ ±
1065	Steve Greenwood		‡
65	Sutcliffe Greenwood		
549	Tom Greenwood		
552	Willy Greenwood		
502	… Gregory		
158	x Albert L. Grey		
151	Tommy H. Grey		
644	D. Griffiths		
428	Oswald "Ossie" Griffiths		
233	Tommy Griffiths		
647	Tyssul "Tuss" Griffiths	Fullback	c. 1954
1019	Nick Grimoldby		
862	Steve Grinhaff		
74	Charley Grisdale		
1197	Scott Grix		1 May 1984 (age 42) ‡ ±
1179	Simon Grix	Centre, Stand-off, Loose forward	28 September 1985 (age 41) ‡ ±
979	Robert Grogan		21 March 1962 (age 64) ‡
551	Gwyn Gronow		
591	Peter Gronow		
260	William Grundy		
1189	Alan Hadcroft	Wing, Centre	‡
116	Herbert Hadwen		
936	Michael Hagan	Stand-off, Scrum-half	12 August 1964 (age 62) ‡
962	Neil Hague	Stand-off	‡
217	Harry Haigh		
343	Herbert Haigh		
218	Herman Haigh		
267	Wilfred Haigh		
164	x William Haigh		
1202	James Haley	Wing, Centre	‡ ±
255	Harry Halford		
22	E. Hall		
1112	Martin Hall	Hooker	5 December 1968 (age 57) ‡
929	Steve Hall		7 September 1967 (age 59) ‡
1044	Graeme Hallas	Centre	27 February 1971 (age 55) ‡
286	Cyril Halliday		
tbc	Danny Halliwell	Wing, Centre	23 March 1981 (age 45) ‡ ±
805	Ian Halliwell		
878	Steve Halloran	Hooker, Second-row	‡
752	Tony Halmshaw		
1161	Colum Halpenny	Wing, Centre	25 April 1979 (age 47) ‡ ±
629	Vernon Halstead		
95	Fred Hammond		
1162	Karle Hammond	Stand-off, Loose forward	25 April 1974 (age 52) ‡ ±
1057	Steve Hampson	Fullback	14 August 1961 (age 65) ‡
986	Andrew Hancock		11 June 1969 (age 57) ‡
1295	Paul Handforth	Stand-off	6 October 1981 (age 45) ‡ ±
1104	Lee Hanlan		6 October 1971 (age 55) ‡
605	John Hanley		
850	Albert Hannah		‡
978	Dean Hanson		4 January 1964 (age 62) ‡
345	Herbert Hanson		
725	Barney Hardcastle		
139	J. Hardy		
1027	Paul Harkin		‡
879	Andrew Harland		
1053	Lee Harland		4 September 1973 (age 53) ‡
1178	Neil Harmon	Prop	9 January 1969 (age 57) ‡
518	Albert Thomas Harris		
731	David Harrison		
1028	Karl Harrison	Prop	20 February 1964 (age 62) ‡
121	Herman Hartley		
1237	Tim Hartley	Stand-off	2 January 1986 (age 40) ‡ ±
1128	Phil Hassan	Wing, Centre, Loose forward	18 August 1974 (age 52) ‡ ±
568	Don Hatfield		
781	Roy Hawksley		
1228	Adam Hayes		‡ ±
600	Desmond Healy		
99	H. Heap		
1293	Ben Heaton	Wing, Centre, Second-row	12 March 1990 (age 36) ‡ ±
1244	Danny Heaton		‡ ±
1226	Keith Heckenberg	Second-row	is this Daniel Heckenberg? ± ‡
1146	Danny Helliwell		
101	Edgar Helliwell		
855	Ian Helliwell		
672	John Helliwell		
32	Robert Helliwell		
1277	Tom Hemingway		±
661	John Henderson		
755	Tony Hepworth		
1297	Sean Hesketh	Prop	17 August 1986 (age 40) ‡ ±
1010	Simon Heslop		
999	Brian Hetherington		14 January 1954 (age 72) ‡
954	Cavill Heugh		31 August 1962 (age 64) ‡
163	Brighton Heyhirst		
429	David Hickey		
365	Laurie Higgins		
368	Alf Higgs		
1078	Paul Highton		10 November 1976 (age 49) ‡ ±
993	Brendan Hill	Prop	‡
1180	John Hill	Prop	7 October 1981 (age 45) ‡ ±
135	Jimmy Hilton		
821	Laurie Hinchliffe		born 31 December 1949 – died c. 15 December 2018...16 December 2018
891	Graham Hirst	Wing, Centre, Stand-off	‡
1222	Joe Hirst	Second-row	21 April 1987 (age 39) ‡ ±
1247	Sam Hoare	Hooker	‡ ±
1110	Andy Hobson	Prop	26 December 1978 (age 47) ‡ ±
674	Norman Hockley		
1119	David Hodgson	Wing, Centre	8 August 1981 (age 45) ‡ ±
152	Fred Hodgson		
264	x Frank Holbrook		
588	Jim Holcroft		
375	T. Holcroft		
1313	Keith Holden		23 June 1993 (age 33) ‡ ±
1223	Dale Holdstock		±
61	A. Holgate		
1132	Stephen Holgate	Prop, Second-row	15 December 1971 (age 54) ‡
982	Les Holliday		8 August 1962 (age 64) ‡
268	Sidney Hollis		
244	Arnold Holmes		
983	David Holmes		‡
655	Jack Holmes		
330	Trialist Holmes		
110	Clement Holroyd		
1114	Graham Holroyd	Fullback, Stand-off, Scrum-half	25 October 1975 (age 51) ‡ ±
646	Bryn Hopkins		
817	Chico Hopkins		
307	F. Hopkinson		
252	Fred Hopkinson		
119	G. Horbury		
137	J. Horner		
93	… Horobin		
162	J. Horrocks		
424	Bill Horrod		
91	W. Horsley		
869	Derek Howard		‡
753	Owen Howard		
131	Albert Howarth		
799	Granville Hoyle		
515	Raymond Hoyle		
1221	Simeon Hoyle	Hooker	‡ ±
295	Tom Hoyle		
507	Barney Hudson		
942	Bob Hudson	Stand-off	‡
215	James Hudson		
719	Phil Hudson		
1149	Adam Hughes	Centre	1 October 1977 (age 49) ‡
887	John "Ken" Hughes		
664	x Reg Hughes		is this Reginald Hughes?
581	Alfred L. Humphrey		
536	Godfrey J. Humphrey		
904	Lee Humphreys		‡
496	E. Humpish		
453	Andrew "Danny" Hurcombe		
333	Danny Hurcombe		
989	Robert Hutchinson	Wing	20 September 1968 (age 58) ‡
633	Ray "Bandy" Illingworth		to York
537	x Jack Ingham		
222	Jim Inman		
1018	Jimmy Irvine		24 April 1960 (age 66) ‡
420	George Irving		
408	Hudson Irving		
401	Jonty Irving		
946	Ken Isaacs		‡
693	Bill Ivill		
485	… Jackson		
776	David Jackson		
697	Duncan Jackson		c. 1963/64
1052	Michael Jackson	Prop, Second-row	11 October 1969 (age 57) ‡
9	Walter Jesse Jackson		
1081	Wayne Jackson	Prop	19 September 1967 (age 59) ‡
1084	x Andy James		30 November 1975 (age 50) ‡
1274	Matt James		±
952	Neil James		‡
715	Ronald James		
685	Alan Jarman		
915	Francis Jarvis	Second-row, Loose forward	‡
843	Peter Jarvis		
398	Bryn Jayne		
816	Tony Jeff		
579	… Jenkins		
278	B. Jenkins		
229	Dan Jenkins		
792	David Jenkins		
635	H. Jenkinson		
370	Abe Johnson		
641	Eric Johnson		
277	John Johnson		
831	Mike "Nicky" Johnson		
1225	Nick Johnson		±
472	William Johnson		
1317	Ben Johnston	Fullback, Stand-off, Scrum-half	8 March 1992 (age 34) ‡ ±
998	Lindsay Johnston		
680	Bryn Jones		
461	Colin Jones		
1186	Danny Jones	Scrum-half	6 March 1986 ‡ ±
739	David Jones		
448	Edgar Jones		
200	Ernest Jones		
499	Glyn Jones		
386	Harry Jones		
84	J. Ernest Jones		
486	Leslie Jones		
1245	Philip "Phil" Joseph	Loose forward	10 January 1985 (age 41) ‡ ±
184	H. Jowett		
506	Ken Jubb		
953	Brian Juliff	Prop	5 December 1956 (age 69) ‡
827	Alan Kane		
465	R. Kavanagh		
449	Lance Kay		
1318	Ben Kaye	Hooker	19 December 1988 (age 37) ‡ ±
1008	Mick Keebles	Second-row	‡
18	Bill Keepings		
706	Jack Keith		
666	Alan Kellett		c. 1963/64
727	Stuart Kelley		
720	Bob Kelly		
770	Mike Kelly		
988	Martin Kemp		‡
569	George Kenny		
1042	Ken Kerr		18 October 1969 (age 57) ‡
475	… Kerwen		
1075	Martin Ketteridge		2 October 1964 (age 62) ‡
564	Stan Kielty		
298	G. Kilbey		
543	… Kilkelly		
955	Joe Kilroy		21 June 1960 (age 66) ‡
301	Eddie P. King		
708	Trevor King		
1217	Andrew “Andy” Kirk	Centre	2 August 1982 (age 44) ‡ ±
194	Ben Kirk		
130	W. Kirk		
758	Bill Kirkbride		
848	George Kirkpatrick		
1177	John Kirkpatrick	Wing	3 January 1979 (age 47) ‡ ±
297	Jack Kitchenman		
11	George Kitson		
391	x Harry Kitson		
269	John "Jack" Kitson		
654	Dave Knopf		
1	Jim Knowles		
59	Reuben Knowles		
39	William "Billy" Knowles		
1125	Simon Knox		14 October 1972 (age 54) ‡ ± Also misnamed on rugbyleagueproject.org as Simon Know ‡
1043	Emosi Koloto		23 January 1965 (age 61) ‡
1260	Craig Kopczak		±
182	Leonard Land		
901	Steve Lane		
180	Thomas H. Lane		
667	Dougie Langhorn		
48	George Langhorn		
290	John Archer Langhorn		
939	Paul Langmack	Loose forward	10 May 1965 (age 61) ‡
870	Terry Langton	Scrum-half, Loose forward	‡
650	Sylvester Lannan		
1209	David “Dave” larder	Second-row	5 June 1976 (age 50) ‡ ±
1196	Scott Law		19 February 1985 (age 41) ‡ ±
1153	Dean Lawford	Stand-off	9 May 1977 (age 49) ‡ ±
1058	Johnny Lawless	Hooker, Second-row, Loose forward	3 November 1974 (age 51) ‡ ±
863	Steve Laws	Prop, Second-row	‡
649	Jimmie Lawton		
1050	Steve Lay		28 March 1968 (age 58) ‡
1155	Jason Lee	Wing	16 January 1971 (age 55) ‡ ±
622	Gordon J. Leeming		
505	Frank Lees		
143	David John Lewis		
111	Fred Lewis		
839	Glyn "Taffy" Lewis		
797	Peter Lewis		
517	Frank Lingard		
494	… Lister		
34	F. Lister		
352	J. Lister		
1046	Roy Litherland		‡
106	William "Billy" Little		
136	Fred Littlewood		
45	Percy Lloyd		
237	Robert "Bobby"/"Bobbie" Lloyd		
662	Gerald Lockwood		
411	Hubert Lockwood		
31	Frank Lodge		
114	William "Billy" Long		
76	Jack Longbottom		
166	Fred Longstaff		
974	Simon Longstaff		2 January 1970 (age 56) ‡
227	William "Bill" Longworth		
760	Brian Lord		
1034	Gary Lord		6 July 1966 (age 60) ‡ ±
279	Sydney Lovely		
857	Ken Loxton	Scrum-half, Loose forward	‡
270	J. Arthur Lumb		
250	Robert Lunn		
640	Thomas “Tommy” Lynch		
71	James Lynes		
991	John Lyons		11 May 1963 (age 63) ‡
327	W. Lyons		
583	Enoka MacDonald		
584	Johnny MacDonald		
1198	Ryan MacDonald		24 February 1978 (age 48) ‡ ±
721	Bill MacFarlane		
851	Ian Maclean		
624	Len Madden		
676	Joe Mageen		
88	Fred Mallinson		
82	Reggie Mallinson		
523	Gus Malone		
1278	Dominic Maloney		±
385	John Maloney		
tbc	Alex Mammone	Prop	‡ ±
1331	Ryan Maneely	Hooker	19 October 1994 (age 32) ‡ ±
487	Johnny Manley		
1298	Dane Manning	Second-row	15 April 1989 (age 37) ‡ ±
302	T. Manning		
735	Tony Manning		
702	Alan Marchant		
659	Jack Marchant		
940	Peter Marles		‡
783	Harry Marney		
1094	Oliver Marns	Wing	10 October 1978 (age 48) ‡
253	Herbert Marsden		
699	Robert "Bob" Marsden		
316	Willie Marsden		
902	Nigel Marshall	Scrum-half	‡
1077	Richard Marshall	Prop, Second-row	9 October 1975 (age 51) ‡
134	Robert Marshall		
711	Alan Martin		
1325	Joe Martin	Fullback	28 March 1995 (age 31) ‡ ±
766	John Martin	Prop	‡
918	Paul Martin	Wing, Centre	‡
844	Phil Martin		
1067	Mick Martindale		13 September 1974 (age 52) ‡
889	Alan Maskill	Hooker	‡
761	Mick Maskill		
627	Billy Mather	Centre	c. 1954
1200	Gareth Matthews		not associated with Halifax on rugbyleagueproject.org, or on loverugbyleague.com?
567	Frank Mawson		
1139	Casey Maybery	Wing	‡ ±
1181	Christopher “Chris” Maye	Centre, Loose forward	28 February 1984 (age 42) ‡
315	Tommy McAllister		
924	Seamus McCallion	Hooker	‡
51	J. McCarthy		
481	Tommy McCue		
958	Alan McCurrie		‡
521	Jack McDonald		
1165	Craig McDowell	Stand-off	5 November 1981 (age 44) ‡ ±
511	Hughie McDowell		
1127	Wesley McGibbon	Wing	‡
284	Tom McGiever		
1045	Mike McLean		11 March 1963 (age 63) ‡
510	P. McManus		
1150	Shayne McMenemy	Stand-off, Second-row, Loose forward	9 July 1976 (age 50) ‡
160	John. Lydon Medley		
992	Paul Medley		21 September 1966 (age 60) ‡
529	J. Meek		
417	Mel Meek		
5	Ben Mellor		
90	George Melvin		
1319	Paul Mennell		26 October 1986 (age 39) ‡ ±
1339	Luke Menzies		±
1108	Gary Mercer	Second-row, Loose forward	22 June 1966 (age 60) ‡
980	Martin Meredith		29 July 1958 (age 68) ‡
412	Bill Merritt		
186	Willie Metcalfe		
744	Terry Michael		
153	F. Miller		
482	Harry Millington		
418	Cai Mills		
419	Jackie Mills		
742	Jim Mills		
1123	Lee Milner		26 February 1977 (age 49) ‡
990	Richard Milner		‡
303	Charlie Milnes		
547	Bernard Mitchell		
46	D. Mitchell		
102	F. Mitchell		
477	G. Mitchell		
397	George Mitchell		
204	H. Mitchell		
328	Harold Mitchell		
668	John Mitchell		
1017	Tony Mitchell		‡
1089	Martin Moana	Centre, Stand-off, Loose forward	13 August 1973 (age 53) ‡ ±
947	David Moll		‡
tbc	Brandon Moore	Hooker	27 July 1996 (age 30) ‡ ±
1003	Darren Moore		
1273	Gareth Moore	Stand-off, Scrum-half	3 June 1989 (age 37) ‡ ±
932	Kevin Moore		30 November 1965 (age 60) ‡
1330	Richard Moore	Prop, Second-row, Loose forward	2 February 1981 (age 45) ‡ ±
23	W. Moore		
535	Bill Morgan		
393	Gil Morgan		
545	J. Morgan		
206	James Morgan		
362	W. J. Morgan		
1063	William Paul Moriarty	Second-row	16 July 1964 (age 62) ‡
1194	Chris Morley	Prop, Second-row	22 September 1973 (age 53) ‡ ±
540	Donald Morley		
120	Harry Morley		
81	Johnny Morley		
tbc	Elliot Morris	Prop, Loose forward	4 January 1996 (age 30) ‡ ±
392	Percy Morris		
1299	Iain Morrison		6 May 1983 (age 43) ‡ ±
78	Walter Morton		
903	Paul Moses	Scrum-half	‡
183	A. Mosley		
867	Kevin Mount		
347	Cyril Moxon		
1191	Mark Moxon	Scrum-half	22 August 1980 (age 46) ‡ ±
671	Stan Moyser		
1261	Jonathan Muir		not associated with Halifax on rugbyleagueproject.org, or on loverugbyleague.com?
585	Anthony Munday		
1073	Damian Munro	Wing	6 October 1976 (age 50) ‡ ±
299	Andrew Murdison		
528	… Murphy		
610	Con Murphy		
tbc	Daniel Murray		±
1309	Scott Murrell	Stand-off, Scrum-half	5 September 1985 (age 41) ‡ ±
790	Stuart Musgrave		
1282	Dylan Nash	Centre, Second-row	‡ ±
124	E. Thornton Naylor		
202	George Naylor		
1138	Jim Naylor	Wing, Centre	‡
856	Stuart Naylor		
1002	David Needham		
296	John Needham		
556	John Needham		
1227	Dayne Neirinckx		not on loverugbyleague.com? 25 January 1983 (age 43) ‡
937	Keith Neller	Prop, Second-row	2 January 1960 (age 66) ‡
852	Paul Nellist		
tbc	Luke Nelmes		‡ ±
439	George Nēpia		
1167	Jason Netherton	Second-row	5 October 1982 (age 44) ‡ ±
54	Arnold Nettleton		
83	A. Newell		
40	… Newman		
373	Bernard Newman		
10	Tommy Nicholl		
943	Scott Nicholls	Wing	‡
763	Ken Nicholson		
634	Alan Nixon		
460	Frank Nolan		
369	Ernest Norcliffe		
1171	Chris Norman	Wing, Centre	22 January 1983 (age 43) ‡
913	Graham North	Second-row	‡
132	Reggie Norton		
tbc	Adam O'Brien		±
1213	Todd O'Brien		not associated with Halifax on rugbyleagueproject.org, or on loverugbyleague.com?
880	Mick O'Byrne	Wing	‡
586	Hugh O'Connor		
835	Lewis O'Connor		
836	Chris O'Dowd		
828	John O'Farrell		
877	Paul O'Hara	Hooker	‡
1103	Kevin O'Loughlin		26 March 1977 (age 49) ‡
696	Terry Ollier		
615	Len Olsen		to Castleford (loan)
527	… O'Neil		
479	F. Osborne		
1284	Michael Ostick	Prop	23 January 1988 (age 38) ‡ ±
165	Horace Otterwell		
900	Arthur Oulton		
861	Brian Outlaw		
675	Garfield Owen		
335	William Howell Owen		
263	J. W. "Bill" Pagan		
883	Steve Page		
329	W. Paisley		
639	Harold Palin		
669	Geoff Palmer		
594	Jack Pansegrouw		
613	Aubrey Pape		
483	Jack Parker		
169	Tom Parker		
70	W. Parker		
1062	Wayne Parker	Scrum-half	2 April 1967 (age 59) ‡
321	E. Parkin		
973	Andy Parkinson		8 July 1965 (age 61) ‡
1004	George Parkinson		
230	Harry Paterson		
1251	Lee Paterson	Wing, Centre	‡ ±
1032	Greg Pearce		2 September 1967 (age 59) ‡
619	Les Pearce		
1097	Martin Pearson	Fullback, Centre, Stand-off, Scrum-half	24 October 1971 (age 55) ‡
288	Arthur Peckett		
190	Arthur Pemberton		
191	Squire Pemberton		
968	John Pendlebury	Loose forward	18 April 1961 (age 65) ‡
1147	Sean Penkywicz	Stand-off, Scrum-half, Hooker	18 May 1982 (age 44) ‡ ±
1220	Joel Penny	Scrum-half	20 January 1980 (age 46) ‡
550	Clifford Pentelow		
1033	Mark Perrett	Second-row	18 July 1973 (age 53) ‡
1136	Mike Peters	Wing	‡
691	Wyn Phillips		c. 1963/64
497	… Pickles		
1049	Damieon Pickles		‡
47	David Pickles		
112	Ephraim Pickles		
1048	Steve Pilgrim		‡
223	Joe Pilling		
565	Albert Pimblett		
1113	Nick Pinkney	Wing	December 6, 1970 (age 55) ‡ ±
767	Graham Pitchforth		
1332	Matt Place		±
1007	Alan Platt	Loose forward	‡
642	Roy Pollard		
793	Barry Potter		
895	Dave Potts	Wing, Centre	‡
1315	Gareth Potts	Wing	25 July 1990 (age 36) ‡ ±
1098	Daio Powell	Wing, Centre	9 March 1973 (age 53) ‡
534	Gordon Pownall		
694	Billy Pratt		
524	Alan Prescott		
967	Chris Preece	Hooker	‡
1026	Mark Preston	Wing	3 April 1967 (age 59) ‡
599	Gareth Price		
769	Malcolm Price		
280	Norman Price		
803	Tony Price		
919	Bob Priestley	Wing	‡
603	Frank Priestley		
571	G. E. "Eddie" Priestley		
925	Neil Pritchard		‡
548	William Pritchard		
759	Brian Probets		
155	Albert Proctor		
596	Ike Proctor		
209	W. Stuart Prosser		
748	Jackie Pycroft		
872	Dean Raistrick		
977	Andrew Ramsden		‡
692	Philip Ramsden		
1015	Neville Ramsey		
985	Jason Ramshaw		23 July 1969 (age 57) ‡
740	Terry Ramshaw		
1118	Craig Randall	Second-row, Loose forward	22 September 1972 (age 54) ‡
539	Gordon Ratcliffe		
1254	Michael “Mike” Ratu		±
271	Frank Rawbone		
1005	Scott Rawlinson		
319	Albert Rawnsley		
tbc	Nick Rawsthorne		±
757	Dave Rayner		
272	Dai Rees		
287	Dick Rees (rugby league)		
201	E. "Ned" Rees		
361	Walter Rees		
733	Derek Reeves		
1218	Damien Reid		±
601	Paddy Reid		
tbc	Martyn Reilly		‡ ±
1294	Wayne Reittie	Wing	21 January 1988 (age 38) ‡ ±
323	Billy Renilson		
687	Charles “Charlie” Renilson		
355	William Renton		
324	Ralph W. Rhoades		
718	Alan Rhodes		
1029	Paul Rhodes		‡
921	Toni Ricci	Wing	‡
1011	Gary Richardson		‡
944	Eddie Riddlesden		‡ ‡
2	James Archer "Archie" Rigg		
1093	Craig Rika		18 January 1974 (age 52) ‡
544	Kia Rika		
681	Bill Riley		
604	Denis Riley		
19	Jack Riley		
104	Joe Riley		
966	Grant Rix	Centre, Loose forward	9 February 1965 (age 61) ‡
239	Tom Robbins		
488	… Roberts		
542	Albert "Sonny" Roberts		
254	Harry Roberts		
376	Joseph Roberts		
732	Ken Roberts		
930	Kenny Roberts		
1006	Lea Roberts		
1241	Mark Roberts	Centre, Second-row	9 November 1982 (age 43) ‡ ±
1144	Robert "Rob" Roberts		21 June 1978 (age 48) ‡ ±
4	Arthur Robertshaw		
216	Ernest Robertshaw		
1296	Adam Robinson	Prop, Second-row	8 April 1987 (age 39) ‡ ±
138	Asa Robinson		
707	Barry Robinson	Scrum-half	c. 1963/64 (Testimonial match 1969)
562	Billy Robinson		
1020	Chris Robinson		2 September 1970 (age 56) ‡
1338	Connor Robinson	Fullback, Stand-off, Scrum-half	23 October 1994 (age 32) ‡ ±
956	Geoff Robinson		14 December 1957 (age 68) ‡
60	I. Robinson		
199	Robert "Bob" Robinson		
981	Steve Robinson		4 March 1965 (age 61) ‡
1188	Jonathan Roper	Centre	5 May 1976 (age 50) ‡ ±
595	John Rothwell		
1059	Paul Round		24 September 1963 (age 63) ‡
304	Charlie Rowlands		
1068	Paul Rowley	Scrum-half, Hooker	12 March 1975 (age 51) ‡
1235	Shad Royston	Fullback, Centre, Loose forward	29 November 1982 (age 43) ‡ ±
1286	Adam Rudd		±
404	Fred Rule		c. 1925 (ex-Redruth R.F.C. fly-half England Schoolboy, Cornwall, Cornwall & Devon against New Zealand(RU))
1101	James Rushforth (rugby league)		9 February 1977 (age 49) ‡ ±
931	Paul Rushforth		‡
203	Bryn Rushton		
25	Tommy Rushton		
275	Donald Rushworth		
935	Ron Ryan	Centre	23 November 1964 (age 61) ‡
1326	James Saltonstall	Fullback, Wing	27 September 1993 (age 33) ‡ ±
818	Malcolm Sampson		
623	William "Bill" Samuel		
tbc	Matt Sarsfield		±
773	John "Sammy" Sanderson		
1134	Lokeni Savelio	Prop	24 November 1969 (age 56) ‡ ±
1321	Tommy Saxton	Wing	3 October 1983 (age 43) ‡ ±
1142	Jonathon “Jon” Scales	Wing	28 July 1974 (age 52) ‡
782	Kevin Scanlan		
560	… Schofield		
906	David Schofield		
651	Derrick Schofield	Second-row	c. 1954
247	x Tom Schofield		
1051	Nesetorio John "Johnny" Schuster	Centre	17 January 1964 (age 62) ‡
717	Bernard Scott		
808	Mick Scott	Second-row, Loose forward	‡
701	Jack Scroby		
1091	Danny Seal	Hooker, Second-row	15 March 1976 (age 50) ‡ ±
532	Percy Searles		
1174	Anthony Seuseu	Prop	24 March 1979 (age 47) ‡
1074	Andy Sewell		‡
512	Tommy Shannon		
873	Greg Sharp	Prop, Second-row	‡
1023	Henry Sharp		17 September 1966 (age 60) ‡
tbc	Will Sharp	Fullback, Wing	13 May 1986 (age 40) ‡ ±
38	G. H. Sharpe		
415	Bill Shaw		
476	D. Shaw		
695	John “Joby” Shaw		
188	Lewis Shaw		
1122	Mick Shaw	Hooker	16 July 1975 (age 51) ‡
384	Joe Sherburn		
1212	Jode Sheriffe		4 July 1986 (age 40) ‡ ±
1184	Rikki Sheriffe	Wing, Centre	5 May 1984 (age 42) ‡ ±
281	Tom Sherwood		
196	William "Billy" Sherwood		
1246	Andy Shickell	Prop	9 May 1981 (age 45) ‡ ±
457	Fred Shillito		
885	Alan Shillitoe	Second-row	‡
788	Colin Shires		
1022	Matthew Silva		‡
1216	Luke Simeunovich		±
864	Colin Simkins		
969	Andy Simpson		‡
746	John Simpson		
1199	Johnny Simpson	Prop	not on loverugbyleague.com ‡ ±
tbc	Michael Sio		16 May 1993 (age 33) ‡ ±
94	… Skelton		
1100	Kelvin Skerrett	Prop	22 May 1966 (age 60) ‡
800	Gerry Slattery		
1085	Michael “Mick” Slicker		16 August 1978 (age 48) ‡
96	J. Slinger		
tbc	Sam Smeaton	Centre	26 October 1988 (age 37) ‡ ±
1255	Andy Smith	Wing	6 July 1984 (age 42) ‡ ±
58	Arthur Smith		
234	Arthur Smith		
1182	Byron Smith	Prop	5 March 1984 (age 42) ‡ ±
437	Charles “Charlie” Smith		
350	Harold Smith		
334	Herbert Smith		
922	Keith Smith		19 November 1952 ‡
1157	Kris Smith Kris Smith		‡
338	Mitchell Smith		
232	Norman Smith		
1250	Paul Smith	Second-row, Loose forward	17 May 1977 (age 49) ‡ ±
1060	Richard Smith	Wing	18 June 1973 (age 53) ‡ ±
917	Steve Smith	Fullback	(Testimonial match 1991)‡ Are both sets of statistics for the same Steve Smith? Fullback, Wing ‡
356	Wilson Smith		
1056	Martyn Smithson		5 October 1968 (age 58) ‡
791	Mick Snee	Fullback, Wing, Centre, Stand-off	‡
686	Alan Snowden		
1239	Paul Southern	Prop	18 March 1976 (age 50) ‡ ±
1009	Roy Southernwood	Scrum-half, Hooker	23 June 1968 (age 58) ‡
427	Les Sowden		
912	Russell Sowden	Hooker	‡
387	Stanley Sparkes		
688	Brian Sparks		
1323	Jack Spencer		21 December 1990 (age 35) ‡ ±
574	S. Spencer		
125	Tommy Spencer		
1210	Andy Spink	Second-row	12 January 1979 (age 47) ‡ ±
945	Darren St Hilaire		‡
1219	Lee St Hilaire		not associated with Halifax on rugbyleagueproject.org, or on loverugbyleague.com?
245	Cyril J. Stacey		
984	Dan Stains		28 June 1964 (age 62) ‡
422	John Standage		
888	George Standidge	Prop	‡
730	Peter Standring		
657	Ron Stanford		
784	Mick Stanley		
145	J. Stansfield		
949	Gary Stephens	Scrum-half	‡
729	Trevor Stevenson		
728	Dave Stockwell		
618	Dougie Stokes		
63	W. Stone		
44	Harold Stoyle		
142	… Street		
1047	Brent Stuart		19 August 1965 (age 61) ‡
118	Fred Summerskill		
490	… Sunderland		
146	L. Sunderland		
261	Willie Sunderland		
242	C. Sutcliffe		
248	Frank Sutcliffe		
77	G. B. Sutcliffe		
830	Paul Sutcliffe		
49	Robert "Bob" Sutcliffe		
305	Sam Sutcliffe		
256	Thomas Herbert Sutcliffe		
109	W. Sutcliffe		
318	William Sutton		
159	A. Swan		
309	George Swan		
806	Paul Sweeney		
103	Jack Swinbank		
648	David Sykes		
582	Jack Sykes		
175	Bert Symons		
1133	Gaël Tallec	Second-row, Loose forward	15 August 1976 (age 50) ‡
1272	Said Tamghart	Prop	‡ ±
1333	Adam Tangata	Prop, Second-row, Loose forward	17 March 1991 (age 35) ‡ ±
491	Edward "Ted" Tattersfield		
179	William H. Tattersley		
492	… Taylor		
317	Arthur Reginald Taylor		
1327	Chris Taylor	Stand-off	25 October 1993 (age 33) ‡ ±
513	Friend Taylor		
389	Harold Taylor		
176	Horace Taylor		
975	Mick Taylor		‡
859	Tommy Taylor		
689	Trevor Taylor		
1301	Anthony Thackeray	Scrum-half	19 February 1986 (age 40) ‡ ±
1145	Jamie Thackray	Prop, Second-row	30 September 1979 (age 47) ‡ ±
64	Arthur J. Thomas		
395	Arthur G. Thomas		
154	Dai Thomas		
378	E. Thomas		
406	Harold Thomas		
458	Idris Thomas		
407	Richard Elwyn Thomas		
181	Alex Thompson		
813	Allan Thomson		
645	John Thorley		
410	Jack Thornber		
578	George Thornett		
572	L. Thornton		
854	Stuart Thornton		
1141	Danny Tickle	Centre, Second-row, Loose forward	8 April 1983 (age 43) ‡ ±
1076	Richard Tiffany		‡
736	Bryan Todd		
246	Frank Todd		
436	George Todd		
628	Peter Todd		
207	Edward Tolan		
390	… Tomkins		
837	Alan Tonks		
1307	Tony Tonks	Prop	27 April 1985 (age 41) ‡ ±
24	Abe S. Toothill		
522	Peter Topping		
451	Fred J. Tottey		
589	H. Townend		
468	Harry Townend		
300	Irvine Townend		
470	James Traill		
670	Ken Traill		
416	Jack Treen		
1243	Aaron Trinder	Prop	not on loverugbyleague.com? ‡
780	Derek Tudball		
1086	Fereti "Freddie" Tuilagi	Wing, Centre	9 June 1971 (age 55) ‡
678	Andrew “Drew” Turnbull		
705	Fred Turnbull		
257	Reg Turnbull		
1036	x Craig Turner		10 March 1973 (age 53) ‡
794	Richard Turner		
1292	Steve Tyrer	Centre	16 March 1989 (age 37) ‡ ±
1079	Mike Umaga	Fullback	19 February 1966 (age 60) ‡
910	Ian Van Bellen	Prop	‡
1236	Richard Varkulis	Centre	21 May 1982 (age 44) ‡ ±
865	x Mick Varley		
251	William E. Varley		
630	Brian Vierod		
291	William H. Vowles		
683	Jim Wagstaff		
210	Thomas Wagstaff		
709	Vic Wainwright		
874	Keith Waites	Wing, Centre	‡
1312	Freddie Walker		±
1229	Nicky Walker		not associated with Halifax on rugbyleagueproject.org, or on loverugbyleague.com?
1265	Joe Walsh		±
73	S. Walsh		
72	W. Walters		
819	David Walton	Prop, Second-row	‡
294	Herman Walton		
148	James Walton		
484	… Ward		
127	Ernest "Eddie" Ward		
580	Ken Ward		
1242	Frank Watene		15 February 1977 (age 49) ‡ ±
310	Eddie Watkins		Eddie Watkins played stand-off in Glamorgan's 18–14 victory over Monmouthshire in the non-County Championship match during the 1926–27 season at Taff Vale Park, Pontypridd on Saturday 30 April 1927.
471	Billy Watson		
1025	Dave Watson		24 May 1966 (age 60) ‡ ±
833	Don Watson		
1238	Ian Watson	Scrum-half	27 October 1976 (age 49) ‡ ±
430	Jack Watson		
798	Mark Watson		
838	David Weavill		
620	Billy Webb		
117	William R. Wedgwood		
1190	Pat Weisner	Loose forward	17 March 1982 (age 44) ‡
911	Paul Welsh	Scrum-half	‡
366	Billy Werrett		
258	Bernard Whitaker		
1203	Matthew Whittaker		±
951	Brendan White		‡
616	Les White		
1249	Paul White	Fullback, Wing	7 December 1982 (age 43) ‡ ±
606	Arthur Whitehead		
607	Clifford "Ernie" Whitehead		
371	Harold Whitehead		
435	George Whitehouse		
892	Nigel Whitehouse	Hooker	‡
14	Ben Whiteley		
331	x Frank Whiteley		
224	Selwyn Whiteley		
960	Colin Whitfield	Centre	‡
866	Steve Whitmore		
170	Hiram Whitwam		
26	S. Wilby		
976	Ian Wilkinson		3 September 1960 (age 66) ‡
612	Jack Wilkinson		
149	William “Billy” J. Williams		
228	Frank Williams		
682	Keith Williams		
796	Paul Williams		
69	W Williams		
115	W. "Wax" Williams		
341	William Albert Williams		
737	Lionel Williamson		
771	David Willicombe		
812	Dave Wilmot		
21	Arthur Wilson		
1257	Jonathan “Dana” Wilson	Prop	‡ ±
13	Harry Wilson		
359	Jack Wilson		
908	Scott Wilson	Wing, Centre	‡
1012	Warren Wilson		3 May 1963 (age 63) ‡
3	Bob Winskill		
292	Arthur Wolfenden		
789	Alan Wood	Prop	‡
80	Fred Wood		
441	Jack Wood		
995	Martin Wood	Stand-off	24 June 1970 (age 56) ‡ ±
1342	Mikey Wood		18 April 1996 (age 30) ‡ ±
tbc	James Woodburn-Hall	Centre	2 February 1995 (age 31) ‡ ±
377	A. Woods		
1160	David Woods	Centre, Loose forward	10 March 1970 (age 56) ‡ ±
177	Wesley Woolford		
403	Bert Woolley		
189	Edgar Woolley		
853	Joe Woolley		
293	William Thomas Wooton		
1268	Rob Worrincy	Wing	9 July 1985 (age 41) ‡ ±
1234	David Wrench	Prop, Second-row	3 January 1978 (age 48) ‡ ±
764	Peter Wright		
684	Dick Wynn		
86	E. Young		
326	Harry Young		
87	J. Young		
312	William "Billy" Young		

- ^¹ = Played For Halifax During More Than One Period
- ^² = Prior to the 1974–75 season all goals, whether; conversions, penalties, or drop-goals, scored two points, consequently prior to this date drop-goals were often not explicitly documented, and "0²" indicates that drop-goals may not have been recorded, rather than no drop-goals scored. In addition, prior to the 1949–50 season, the Field-goal was also still a valid means of scoring points.
- ^³ = During the first two seasons of the Northern Union (now known as the Rugby Football League), i.e. the 1895–96 season and 1896–97 season, conversions were worth 2-points, penalty goals 3-points and drop goals 4-points
- ¢ = player has (potential) links to other rugby league clubs on Wikipedia
- BBC = BBC2 Floodlit Trophy
- CC = Challenge Cup
- CF = Championship Final
- CM = Captain Morgan Trophy
- RT = League Cup, i.e. Player's No. 6, John Player (Special), Regal Trophy
- YC = Yorkshire County Cup
- YL = Yorkshire League

== Players earning international caps while at Halifax ==
- Alvin Ackerley won caps for England while at Halifax 1952 Other Nationalities (2 matches), Wales, 1953 France (2 matches), Wales, and won caps for Great Britain while at Halifax 1952 Australia, 1958 New Zealand
- Albert Akroyd won caps for England while at Halifax 1921 Wales
- Asa Amone won caps for Tonga while at Halifax 1995 ?-caps
- Albert Atkinson won caps for England while at Halifax 1930 Other Nationalities
- Simon Baldwin won caps for England while at Halifax 1995 Wales (sub), France
- Ike Bartle won caps for England while at Halifax 1906 Other Nationalities
- Arthur Bassett won caps for Wales while at Halifax 1939...1946 3-caps, and won caps for Great Britain while at Halifax in 1946 against Australia (2 matches)
- David Bates won caps for Ireland while at Gateshead Thunder, Halifax and York City Knights 2003...2006 3-caps + 3-caps (sub)
- Jack Beames won a cap for Other Nationalities while at Halifax, won caps for Wales while at Halifax 1914...1921 2-caps, and won caps for Great Britain while at Halifax in 1921 against Australia (2 matches)
- Nat Bentham won caps for England while at Wigan Highfield 1928 Wales (2 matches), while at Halifax: 1929 Other Nationalities, while at Warrington 1930 Other Nationalities(2 matches), and won caps for Great Britain while at Wigan Highfield 1928 Australia (3 matches), New Zealand (3 matches), while at Halifax: 1929–30 Australia (2 matches), while at Warrington: Australia (2 matches)
- John Bentley won caps for England while at Halifax 1995 France, Australia, Fiji, South Africa, 1996 Wales, and won caps for Great Britain while at Leeds 1992 France, Halifax 1994 France
- Dai Royston Bevan won caps for Great Britain while at Halifax ?-caps
- Harry Beverley won caps for England while at Hunslet 1935 Wales, 1936 France, 1937 France, 1938 Wales, France, and won caps for Great Britain while at Hunslet 1936 Australia (3 matches), 1937 Australia, Halifax 1937 Australia (2 matches)
- Anthony Blackwood won caps for Wales while at Halifax, and Celtic Crusaders 2005...present 7(6?)-caps 3-tries 12-points
- Billy Bulmer won caps for England while at Halifax 1904 Other Nationalities
- Oliver Burgham won caps for Wales while at Ebbw Vale in 1908 against New Zealand, and England, and won a cap for Great Britain while at Halifax in 1911 against Australia
- Phil Cantillon won caps for and captained ‘’Ireland’’ while at Halifax 2003–2006
- Gavin Clinch won caps for Ireland while at Huddersfield-Sheffield Giants, and Halifax 2000...2001 1-cap + 1-cap (sub)
- Mike Condon won caps for Wales while at Halifax 1952...1953 3-caps
- Terry Cook won caps for Wales while at Halifax 1951...1953 4-caps
- Arthur Daniels won caps for Wales while at Halifax 1949...1953 13-caps, and won caps for Great Britain while at Halifax 1952...1955 3-caps
- Ivor Davies? won caps for Wales while at Halifax, and represented Great Britain (tour-matches) while at Halifax
- Will Davies, Will T. Davies won caps for Wales while at Batley and Halifax 1909...1912 4-caps, and won a cap for Great Britain while at Halifax in 1911 against Australia
- Ken Dean won caps for England while at Halifax 1951 Other Nationalities, 1952 Other Nationalities
- Colin Dixon won caps for Wales while at Halifax, Salford and Hull Kingston Rovers 1963...1981 (11?) 16-caps, and won caps for Great Britain while at Halifax, Salford and Hull Kingston Rovers 1968...1981 14-caps
- Percy Eccles won caps for England while at Halifax 1908 New Zealand, and won caps for Great Britain while at Halifax 1908 New Zealand
- Arthur 'Candy' Evans won caps for Wales while at Halifax, Leeds, Castleford, and Warrington 1928...1933 4-caps
- Fred Firth, won caps for England (RU) while at Halifax in 1894 against Wales, Ireland, and Scotland
- Ben Fisher won caps for Scotland while at Halifax, and Hull Kingston Rovers 2005...present 6-caps + 1-cap (sub)
- Terry Fogerty represented Commonwealth XIII while at Halifax in 1965 against New Zealand at Crystal Palace National Recreation Centre, London on Wednesday 18 August 1965, and won caps for Great Britain while at Halifax in 1966 against New Zealand, while at Wigan in 1967 against France, and while at Rochdale in 1974 against France
- Damian Gibson won caps for Wales while at Halifax, Salford, and Castleford (1996?)1999...present 16(15, 18?)-caps + 2-caps (sub) 8-tries 32-points
- Tony Halmshaw won a cap for Great Britain while at Halifax in 1971 against New Zealand
- Karl Harrison won caps for England while at Halifax 1995 Wales, Australia (2 matches), South Africa, Wales, 1996 France, and won caps for Great Britain while at Hull F.C. 1990 Australia (3 matches), while at Halifax 1991 Papua New Guinea, 1992 Australia (sub) (2 matches), New Zealand, New Zealand (sub), 1993 France, New Zealand (2 matches), 1994 Australia (3 matches)
- James "Jimmy" Hilton won caps for England while at Halifax 1908 Wales, 1912 Wales
- Hudson Irving won caps for England while at Halifax 1938 Wales, 1940 Wales, 1941 Wales, 1943 Wales
- Michael Jackson won caps for Great Britain while at Wakefield Trinity 1991 Papua New Guinea, 1992 France, Australia (sub), New Zealand (sub), while at Halifax 1993 New Zealand (sub) (2 matches)
- Walter Jesse Jackson, won caps for England (RU) while at Halifax in 1894 against Scotland
- Neil James won a cap for Great Britain while at Halifax in 1986 against France
- David Jones won caps for Wales while at Halifax 1968...1969 2-caps
- Phil Joseph won caps for Wales while at Hull Kingston Rovers and Halifax 2005...2007 7(6?)-caps 1-try 4-points
- Martin Ketteridge won caps for Scotland while at Halifax 1996 3-caps + 1-cap (sub)
- Stanley "Stan" Kielty won caps for England while at Halifax 1953 Wales, France, Other Nationalities
- George Langhorn won caps for England while at Halifax 1905 Other Nationalities
- Jason Lee won caps for Wales while at Warrington, Keighley and Halifax 1994...2001 5-caps + 2-caps (sub) 2-tries 8-points
- William "Billy" B. Little won caps for England while at Halifax 1904 Other Nationalities
- "Bobby"/"Robbie" Lloyd won 7-caps for Wales (RU) while at Pontypool RFC, won a cap for Wales (RL) while at Halifax in 1921, and won a cap for Great Britain (RL) while at Halifax in 1920 against Australia
- Tommy Lynch won caps for Other Nationalities while at Halifax (4-caps).
- Mel Meek won caps for Wales while at Halifax 1935...1949 14-caps
- Alf Milnes won caps for Great Britain while at Halifax in 1920 against Australia (2 matches)
- Paul Moriarty won caps for Wales while at Widnes, Halifax, South Wales, and unattached 1991...2000 15(14?)-caps + 1-cap (sub)
- Chris Morley won caps for Wales while at St. Helens in 1996 against France (sub), and England, while at Salford in 1999 against Ireland and Scotland, while at Sheffield Eagles in 2000 against South Africa (sub), while at Leigh in the 2000 Rugby League World Cup against Lebanon (sub), New Zealand, Papua New Guinea (sub), and Australia, while at Oldham in 2001 against England, while at Halifax in 2003 against Russia, and Australia, while at Swinton in 2006 against Scotland, 1996...2006 13(14?)-caps + 4-caps (sub) 1(2?)-try 4(8?)-points
- Johnny Morley won caps for England while at Halifax 1904 Other Nationalities
- Walter Morton won caps for England while at Halifax 1905 Other Nationalities
- Andrew Murdison won cap(s) for Other Nationalities while at Halifax
- Garfield Owen a won cap for Wales while at Halifax 1959 1-cap
- Sean Penkywicz won caps for Wales while at Halifax 2007...present 1-cap + 3-caps (sub) 1-try 4-points
- Mark Perrett won caps for Wales while at Halifax 1994...1996(1995?) 9(7?)-caps
- Daio Powell won caps for Wales while at Halifax?/Bradford Northern? 1994(...1998?) 1(4?)-caps + 2-caps (sub) 2-tries 8-points
- Stuart Prosser won a cap for Great Britain while at Halifax in 1914 against Australia
- Dai Rees won a cap for Other Nationalities while at Halifax, won caps for Wales while at Halifax 1921...32 6-caps, and won a cap for Great Britain while at Halifax in 1926 against New Zealand
- Charlie Renilson won caps for Great Britain while at Halifax 1965 New Zealand, 1967 Australia (sub), 1968 France (2 matches), Australia, France, New Zealand, France (World Cup 1968 3-caps)
- Jack Riley won caps for England while at Halifax 1904 Other Nationalities
- Joe Riley won caps for England while at Halifax 1910 Wales, 1911 Australia, and won caps for Great Britain while at Halifax 1910 Australia
- Ken Roberts won caps for Great Britain whilst at Halifax 1963 Australia, 1964 against France (2 matches), in 1965 against France, and New Zealand (3 matches), and in 1966 against France, and New Zealand (2 matches)
- Mark Roberts won a cap for Wales while at Halifax 2007 1-cap
- Asa Robinson won caps for England while at Halifax 1908 Wales (2 matches), New Zealand, 1909 Australia (3 matches), and won caps for Great Britain while at Halifax 1908 New Zealand, 1908–09 Australia (2 matches)
- Paul Rowley won caps for England while at Halifax 1996 France (sub), 2000 Australia, Russia, Ireland
- Derrick Schofield won caps for England while at Rochdale Hornets 1952 Wales, 1953 France, and won caps for Great Britain while at Halifax 1955 New Zealand
- John Schuster won caps for Western Samoa while at Halifax 1995 ?-caps
- S. John "Joby" Shaw won caps for Great Britain while at Halifax 1960 France, Australia, France, 1961 France, 1962 New Zealand (World Cup 1960 2-caps)
- Matthew Silva won a cap for Wales while at Halifax 1991 1-cap
- George Slicker won a cap for Ireland while at Halifax 1995 1-cap + 1-cap (sub)
- Herbert Smith won caps for England while at Halifax 1927 Wales, and won caps for Great Britain while at Bradford 1926–27 New Zealand (2 matches)
- Cyril Stacey won a cap for Great Britain while at Halifax in 1920 against New Zealand
- Dai Thomas won caps for Wales while at Halifax 1908, against England in 1908 3-caps
- George Thomson, won caps for England (RU) while at Halifax in 1878 against Scotland, in 1882 against Ireland, Scotland and Wales, in 1883 against Ireland, and Scotland, in 1884 against Ireland and Scotland, and in 1885 against Ireland
- John Thorley won caps for Other Nationalities while at Halifax circa-1952...60 2-caps, won caps for Wales while at Halifax 1953...1959 (2?)3-caps, and won caps for Great Britain while at Halifax in the 1954 Rugby League World Cup against Australia, France, New Zealand, and France, and also represented Great Britain while at Halifax between 1952 and 1956 against France (1 non-Test match)
- Frank Todd won caps for England while at Halifax 1921 Australia, 1923 Wales, 1924 Other Nationalities
- Ernest Ward won caps for England while at Halifax 1909 Australia
- Les White won caps for England while at York 1946 France (2 matches), Wales (2 matches), 1947 France (2 matches), Wales, while at Wigan 1947 Wales, 1948 France, while at Halifax 1951 Wales, and won caps for Great Britain while at York 1946 Australia (3 matches), New Zealand, while at Wigan 1947 New Zealand (2 matches)
- Jack Wilkinson won caps for England while at Halifax 1953 Other Nationalities, 1955 Other Nationalities, and won caps for Great Britain while at Halifax 1954 Australia, New Zealand (2 matches), 1955 New Zealand (3 matches), Wakefield Trinity 1959 Australia, 1960 France (2 matches), New Zealand, France, Australia, 1962 New Zealand (World Cup 1960 3-caps, 1-try)
- Harry Wilkinson, won a cap for England (RU) while at Halifax in 1889 against New Zealand Natives
- Frank Williams won a cap for Wales while at Halifax in 1914, and won caps for Great Britain while at Halifax in 1914 against Australia (2 matches)
- William Williams won caps for Wales while at Halifax 1908...10 4-caps
- David Willicombe won caps for Wales while at Halifax in 1970 against England, while at Wigan in 1975 against France, and England, in the 1975 Rugby League World Cup against France, England, Australia, New Zealand, New Zealand and France, and in 1978 against France, England and Australia, and won caps for Great Britain while at Wigan in 1974 against France (2 matches), and New Zealand
- Albert Wood, won a cap for England (RU) while at Halifax in 1884 against Ireland

== Halifax RLFC Hall of Fame ==
- George Thomson Forward 1875–85
- Jimmy Dodd Centre 1876–93
- Archie Rigg Half-Back 1891–1915
- George Langhorn Forward 1897–1913;
- Joe Riley Centre 1901–15
- Billy Little Full-Back 1901–10
- Asa Robinson Forward 1904–23
- Jack Beames Forward 1913–22
- Cyril Stacey Three-Quarter 1915–29
- Frank Todd Stand-off 1916–28
- Dai Rees Forward 1921–32
- Hudson Irving Forward 1933–47
- Hubert Lockwood Full-Back 1934–46 Rugby League XIII 1942
- Charles Smith Centre 1936–48
- Harry Beverley Loose forward 1937–41
- Arthur Bassett Winger 1939–48
- Arthur Daniels Winger 1945–57
- Stan Kielty Scrum-Half 1946–58 (Testimonial match 1955)
- Ken Dean Stand-off 1948–60 (Testimonial match 1958)
- Jack Wilkinson Prop 1948–59 (Testimonial match 1958)
- Alvin Ackerley Hooker 1948–58
- Albert Fearnley Second Row 1950–56
- Tommy Lynch Centre 1951–56 (Testimonial match 1956)
- John Thorley Prop 1952–60
- John Burnett Centre 1953–67
- Johnny Freeman Winger 1954–67 (Testimonial match 1967)
- Garfield Owen Full-Back 1956–61
- Charlie Renilson Loose forward 1957–69 (Testimonial match 1968)
- Jack Scroby Prop 1959–70 (Testimonial match 1969)
- Terry Fogerty Second Row 1961–73
- Ronnie James Full-Back 1961–72 (Testimonial match 1971)
- Colin Dixon Centre 1961–68
- Ken Roberts Prop 1963–67
- Gordon Baker Scrum-Half 1964–82 (Testimonial match 1975)
- John A Martin Second-Row 1967–1980 (Testimonial match 1978)
- Mick Scott Second Row 1974–91 (1987 Challenge Cup Winner)
- Chris Anderson Stand-off 1984–87
- Karl Harrison Prop 1991–98
- Steve Smith Full Back 1982–92
- John Bentley Winger 1992–98
- Steve Tyrer Centre 2012–20
- Scott Murrell Stand-off 2013–20
- Bruce Burton Stand-off 1969–76
- Ben Beevers Prop 1980–90

== Other notable players ==
These players have either; played in a Challenge Cup, Rugby Football League Championship, Yorkshire County Cup, or Yorkshire League Final, played during Super League (Super League I (1996)) -to- Super League VIII (2003), have received a Testimonial match, were international representatives before, or after, their time at Halifax, or are notable outside of rugby league.

- Makali Aizue
- F. T. "Hefty" Adams
- Paul Anderson
- Albert Atkinson
- Damian Ball
- Stephen Bannister
- Benjamin "Ben" Beevers
- Martin Bella
- Bob Beswick
- Jamie Bloem
- Fred Bone
- Joseph Bonnar
- David Bouveng
- Gwilym Bowen
- Dominic Brambani
- Luke Branighan
- Paul Broadbent
- Andrew Brocklehurst
- Mike Brown
- Peter Brown
- David "Dave" Busfield
- David "Dave" Callon
- Phil Cantillon
- Chris Chester
- Des Clarkson
- Ryan Clayton
- Colin Clifft
- John Clough
- Jack P. Clowes
- Isaac Cole
- Ged Corcoran
- Shirley Crabtree, Sr
- Phil Cantillon
- John Dalgreen
- Trevor Denton
- Paul Dixon
- Dane Dorahy
- John Dorahy
- Hugh Duffy
- Andrew Dunemann
- Graham Eadie
- Rod Eastwood
- Abi Ekoku
- Mark Elia
- St. John Ellis
- Anthony Farrell
- Liam Finn
- Lee Finnerty
- Mark Flanagan
- Jason Flowers
- Adam Fogerty
- Norman Foster
- Frank Fox
- Andrew Frew
- Jim Gannon
- Stanley Gene
- Wilfred "Wilf" George
- Damian Gibson
- Mark Gleeson
- Marvin Golden
- Lee Greenwood
- Tommy Grey
- Oswald Griffiths
- Tyssul Griffiths
- Scott Grix
- Simon Grix
- Michael Hagan
- James Haley
- Martin Hall
- Graeme Hallas
- Danny Halliwell
- Colum Halpenny
- Karle Hammond
- Paul Harkin
- Neil Harmon
- Phil Hassan
- Roy Hawksley
- John Henderson
- Aaron Heremaia
- Alfred Higgs
- Paul Highton
- Joe Hirst
- David Hodgson
- Stephen Holgate
- Les Holliday
- Graham Holroyd
- Adam Hughes
- Duncan Jackson
- Francis Jarvis
- Danny Jones
- Brian Juliff
- Alan Kellett
- Andrew Kirk
- Simon Knox
- Craig Kopczak
- Dave Larder
- Dean Lawford
- Alan Marchant
- Richard Marshall
- William "Billy" Mather
- Seamus McCallion
- Ryan McDonald
- Shayne McMenemy
- Dominic Maloney
- Christopher Maye
- Gary Mercer
- Jim Mills
- Lee Milner
- Martin Moana
- Kevin Moore
- Gilbert Morgan
- Damian Munro
- Keith Neller
- George Nēpia
- Tawera Nikau
- Harold Palin
- Leslie "Les" Pearce
- Martin Pearson
- John Pendlebury
- Joel Penny
- Wyn Phillips
- Billy Pratt
- Michael Ratu
- Paddy Reid
- Rob Roberts
- Barry Robinson
- Geoff Robinson
- Paul Round
- Shad Royston
- Fred Rule
- Derek Schofield
- Mick Scott
- Anthony Seuseu
- Rikki Sheriffe
- Andy Smith
- Richard Smith
- Steve Smith
- Roy Southernwood
- Brian Sparks
- Andy Speak
- Marcus St Hilaire
- Dan Stains
- Gary Stephens
- Said Tamghart
- Jamie Thackray
- Danny Tickle
- Fred Tottey
- Ken Traill
- Aaron Trinder
- Freddie Tuilagi
- Mike Umaga
- Frank Watene
- Dave Watson
- Paul White
- Colin Whitfield
- Lionel Williamson
- Scott Wilson
- Rob Worrincy
- David Wrench
