= James Haley =

James Haley may refer to:

- James A. Haley (1899–1981), U.S. representative from Florida
- James L. Haley, American author of Texas history and fiction
- James Haley (rugby league) (born 1985), Irish rugby league player for Halifax
- James Haley (baseball) (fl. 1880), 19th century baseball player
- James Haley (pentathlete) (born 1969), American modern pentathlete
- James Haley (sailor) (1824–1880), Medal of Honor recipient during the American Civil War
- James T. Haley, author of the Afro-American Encyclopaedia and Sparkling Gems of Race Knowledge Worth Reading
