= Langhorn =

Langhorn is a surname. Notable people with the surname include:

- Garfield M. Langhorn (1948–1969), United States Army soldier
- George Langhorn (1881–1934), English professional rugby league footballer

== See also ==
- Langhorns, Swedish musical group
