= Ike Bartle =

England international rugby league footballer

Personal information
- Full name: Irvine Bartle
- Born: 12 May 1880
- Died: 25 June 1949 (age 69); Clayton, Yorkshire, England

Playing information
- Position: Forward
Club
| Years | Team | Pld | T | G | FG | P |
|---|---|---|---|---|---|---|
| 1899–08 | Halifax | 237 | 24 | 1 | 0 | 74 |
Representative
| Years | Team | Pld | T | G | FG | P |
| 1906 | England | 1 | 0 | 0 | 0 | 0 |

Irvine "Ike" Bartle (12 May 1880 – 25 June 1949) was an English professional rugby league footballer who played as a forward in the 1890s and 1900s. He played at representative level for England, and at club level for Halifax.

== Playing career ==
=== Challenge Cup Final appearances ===
Ike Bartle played as a forward in Halifax's 7-0 victory over Salford in the 1902–03 Challenge Cup Final during the 1902–03 season at Headingley, Leeds on Saturday 25 April 1903, in front of a crowd of 32,507, and played as a forward in the 8-3 victory over Warrington in the 1903–04 Challenge Cup Final during the 1903–04 season at The Willows, Salford on Saturday 30 April 1904, in front of a crowd of 17,041.

=== International honours ===
Ike Bartle won a cap for England while at Halifax in 1906 against Other Nationalities.
