= Johnny Morley =

England international rugby league footballer

Personal information
- Full name: John Morley
- Born: unknown
- Died: unknown

Playing information
- Position: Stand-off, Scrum-half
Club
Years	Team	Pld	T	G	FG	P
1899–05	Halifax	130	29	3	0	93
Representative
Years	Team	Pld	T	G	FG	P
1904	England	1	0	0	0	0

John "Johnny" Morley (birth unknown – death unknown) was an English professional rugby league footballer who played in the 1900s. He played at representative level for England, and at club level for Halifax, as a stand-off or scrum-half.

== Playing career ==
=== Club career ===
Morley started his career as a rugby union player at Sowerby Bridge, with whom he won the Yorkshire Cup. He joined Halifax in 1899.

Morley played stand-off in Halifax's 7–0 victory over Salford in the 1902–03 Challenge Cup Final during the 1902–03 season at Headingley, Leeds on Saturday 25 April 1903, in front of a crowd of 32,507, and he played scrum-half in the 8–3 victory over Warrington in the 1903–04 Challenge Cup Final during the 1903–04 season at The Willows, Salford on Saturday 30 April 1904, in front of a crowd of 17,041.

Morley's career was ended prematurely by a knee injury, which happened in a match against Bradford in February 1905.

=== International honours ===
Morley won a cap for England while at Halifax in 1904 Other Nationalities.
