= 1902–03 Challenge Cup =

Rugby league competition

1903 Challenge Cup
- Duration: 6 rounds
- Highest attendance: 32,507
- Winners: Halifax
- Runners-up: Salford

The 1903 Challenge Cup was the 7th staging of rugby league's oldest knockout competition, the Challenge Cup. It featured clubs from the 1902-03 Northern Rugby Football Union season.

== First round ==
Date	Team One	Score	Team Two
14 Feb	Birkenhead	15–0	Werneth
14 Feb	Bradford	10–5	Huddersfield
14 Feb	Bramley	10–5	Pontefract
14 Feb	Broughton Rangers	0–2	Oldham
14 Feb	Castleford	2–0	Thrum Hall
14 Feb	Dewsbury	0–15	Leeds
14 Feb	Halifax	34–0	Salterhebble
14 Feb	Hull Kingston Rovers	2–6	York
14 Feb	Hunslet	18–5	Cleckheaton
14 Feb	Keighley	37–0	Heckmondwike
14 Feb	Kendal Hornets	3–5	Morecambe
14 Feb	Kinsley	0–8	Brighouse Rangers
14 Feb	Leigh	0–0	Swinton
14 Feb	Manningham	0–0	Idle
14 Feb	Millom	10–0	Lancaster
14 Feb	Ossett	0–0	Otley
14 Feb	Parton	9–5	Workington
14 Feb	Rochdale Hornets	33–0	Alverthorpe
14 Feb	Runcorn	7–2	Widnes
14 Feb	St Helens	6–3	Warrington
14 Feb	Seaton Rangers	2–5	Barrow
14 Feb	South Shields	58–0	St. Paul's
14 Feb	Sowerby Bridge	5–14	Batley
14 Feb	Stockport	0–8	Wigan
14 Feb	Wakefield Trinity	3–0	Holbeck
14 Feb	Wath Brow Hornets	5–0	Whitehaven Recs
14 Feb	Windhill	0–8	Normanton
18 Feb - replay	Idle	0–12	Manningham
18 Feb - replay	Otley	2–0	Ossett
18 Feb - replay	Swinton	5–7	Leigh

== Second round ==
Date	Team One	Score	Team Two
21 Feb	Bramley	0–9	Bradford
21 Feb	Brighouse Rangers	12–2	South Shields
21 Feb	Castleford	0–0	Halifax
21 Feb	Hull Marlborough	0–45	Hull FC
21 Feb	Maryport	2–2	Parton
21 Feb	Morecambe	0–0	Millom
21 Feb	Normanton	2–9	Batley
21 Feb	Oldham	4–0	Wigan
21 Feb	Outwood Church	0–7	Hunslet
21 Feb	Runcorn	18–0	Birkenhead
21 Feb	St Helens	2–8	Rochdale Hornets
21 Feb	Salford	11–0	Leigh
21 Feb	Wakefield Trinity	0–13	Leeds
21 Feb	Wath Brow Hornets	5–15	Barrow
21 Feb	York	17–2	Otley
24 Feb	Keighley	12–0	Manningham
25 Feb - replay	Halifax	10–3	Castleford
25 Feb - replay	Millom	10–2	Morecambe
25 Feb - replay	Parton	0–5	Maryport

== Third round ==
Date	Team One	Score	Team Two
07 Mar	Barrow	7–2	Batley
07 Mar	Bradford	0–2	Oldham
07 Mar	Halifax	0–0	Brighouse Rangers
07 Mar	Hunslet	5–2	Leeds
07 Mar	Keighley	2–2	York
07 Mar	Millom	0–7	Hull FC
07 Mar	Rochdale Hornets	0–15	Salford
07 Mar	Runcorn	17–3	Maryport
10 Mar - replay	Brighouse Rangers	2–8	Halifax
11 Mar - replay	York	12–9	Keighley

== Quarterfinals ==
Date	Team One	Score	Team Two
21 Mar	Barrow	0–3	Hull FC
21 Mar	Oldham	8–0	Hunslet
21 Mar	Runcorn	0–2	Halifax
21 Mar	York	2–25	Salford

== Semifinals ==
Date	Team One	Score	Team Two
04 Apr	Halifax	8–5	Hull FC
04 Apr	Salford	0–0	Oldham
08 Apr - replay	Salford	8–0	Oldham

== Final ==
The final was contested by Halifax and Salford at Headingley Stadium in Leeds. on Saturday 25 April 1903, in front of a crowd of 32,507. Halifax were victorious, beating Salford 7–0.

25 April 1903

Halifax	7 – 0	Salford
	Report

Headingley, Leeds
Attendance: 32,507

1	William Little
2	William Wedgwood
3	W. "Wax" Williams
4	Archie Rigg
5	Herbert Hadwen
6	Johnny Morley
7	Joe Riley
8	Jack Riley
9	Ike Bartle
10	Fred Mallinson
11	Jack Swinbank
12	Walter Morton
13	Fred Hammond
14	Billy Bulmer
15	R. S. "Bob" Winskill

1	Dan Smith
2	Archie Norris
3	Robert Messer
4	James Lomas
5	Thomas Bell
6	Zeke Harter
7	Ben Griffiths
8	Jack Williams
9	Jack Rhapps
10	Pat Tunney
11	George Heath
12	William Brown
13	Herbert Buckler
14	Robert Shaw
15	Hugh Shore
