= Walter Morton =

England international rugby league footballer

Personal information
- Full name: Walter Morton
- Born: c. 1878
- Died: 1 June 1926 (aged 48) Halifax, Yorkshire, England

Playing information
- Position: Forwards
Club
Years	Team	Pld	T	G	FG	P
1899–1906	Halifax	198	2	0	0	6
Representative
Years	Team	Pld	T	G	FG	P
1904–05	Yorkshire	3	0	0	0	0
1905	England	1	0	0	0	0

Walter Morton (c. 1878 – 1926) was an English professional rugby league footballer who played as a forward in the 1900s. He played at representative level for England, and at club level for Halifax.

== Playing career ==
=== Challenge Cup Final appearances ===
Walter Morton played as a forward in Halifax's 7–0 victory over Salford in the 1902–03 Challenge Cup Final during the 1902–03 season at Headingley, Leeds on Saturday 25 April 1903, in front of a crowd of 32,507, and played as a forward in the 8–3 victory over Warrington in the 1903–04 Challenge Cup Final during the 1903–04 season at The Willows, Salford on Saturday 30 April 1904, in front of a crowd of 17,041.

=== International honours ===
Walter Morton won a cap for England while at Halifax in 1905 against Other Nationalities.
