= Jack Riley (rugby league) =

England international rugby league footballer

Personal information
- Born: c. 1874
- Died: 19 June 1924 (aged 50) Halifax, England

Playing information

Rugby union
Club
Years	Team	Pld	T	G	FG	P
1893–95	Halifax

Rugby league
- Position: Forward
Club
Years	Team	Pld	T	G	FG	P
1895–1907	Halifax	315	18	0	0	54
Representative
Years	Team	Pld	T	G	FG	P
1904	England	1	0	0	0	0

Jack Riley (c. 1874 – 19 June 1924) was an English professional rugby league footballer who played in the 1900s. He played at representative level for England, and at club level for Halifax, as a forward, and represented England in the first ever international rugby league game in 1904.

== Playing career ==
Riley started his rugby career with his local team in the village of Luddenden Foot, aged 17. In October 1893, he was signed by Halifax.

=== Challenge Cup Final appearances ===
Jack Riley played as a forward in Halifax's 7–0 victory over Salford in the 1902–03 Challenge Cup Final during the 1902–03 season at Headingley, Leeds on Saturday 25 April 1903, in front of a crowd of 32,507, and played as a forward in the 8–3 victory over Warrington in the 1903–04 Challenge Cup Final during the 1903–04 season at The Willows, Salford on Saturday 30 April 1904, in front of a crowd of 17,041.

=== International honours ===
Jack Riley won a cap playing as a forward (in an experimental 12-a-side team), for England in the 3–9 defeat by Other Nationalities at Central Park, Wigan on Tuesday 5 April 1904, in the first ever international rugby league match.

== Personal life ==
After retiring from rugby, Riley became a pub licensee. On 19 June 1924, Riley died at the Old King Cross Inn in Halifax, aged 50. He was buried in Stoney Royd Cemetery.
