= John Martin (rugby league) =

English rugby league footballer

Personal information
- Born: 1 May 1948 (age 78) Halifax, England

Playing information
- Position: Prop, Second-row, Lock
Club
Years	Team	Pld	T	G	FG	P
1967–80	Halifax	263	20	8	0	76
1980–83	Keighley	36	2	0	0	6
	Total	299	22	8	0	82

John Martin (born 1 May 1948) is an English former professional rugby league footballer who played in the 1960s, 1970s and 1980s. He signed for his hometown club, Halifax, in 1967 as a nineteen-year-old from Siddal ARLFC, and played a total of 262 games until his transfer to Keighley in 1980.

Career highlights include winning the Halifax RLFC Player of the Year award in seasons 1974–75 and 1977–78, being awarded of the James Harrison Trophy (fairest and most loyal player in Yorkshire) in 1977.

== Background ==
Martin was born in Halifax, West Riding of Yorkshire, England.

== Playing career ==
=== Player's No.6 Trophy Final appearances ===
Martin played second-row in Halifax's 22-11 victory over Wakefield Trinity in the 1971–72 Player's No.6 Trophy Final during the 1971–72 season at Odsal Stadium, Bradford on Saturday 22 January 1972.

=== Testimonial match ===
Martin's Testimonial match at Halifax took place in 1978.

== Honoured at Halifax RLFC ==
Martin is a Halifax RLFC Hall Of Fame Inductee, he was admitted to the Hall of Fame, alongside Karl Harrison in October 2010.
