= Wax Williams =

Wales international rugby league footballer

Personal information
- Full name: William Williams
- Born: 1879 Cardiff, Wales
- Died: 28 April 1936 Cardiff, Wales

Playing information

Rugby union
- Position: Wing
Club
Years	Team	Pld	T	G	FG	P
1898–1902	Cardiff RFC

Rugby league
- Position: Centre
Club
Years	Team	Pld	T	G	FG	P
1902–07	Halifax	151	21	5	0	73

William "Wax" Williams (1879 – 1936) was a Welsh rugby union and rugby league footballer who played in the 1900s. He played for Cardiff RFC in rugby union as a wing, and for Halifax in rugby league as a centre.

== Playing career ==
=== Rugby union ===
Williams played rugby union for Cardiff RFC between 1898 and 1902, making 58 appearances.

=== Rugby league ===
Williams was signed by Halifax in 1902. He helped the club win its first league championship in the 1902–03 season, and won two Challenge Cup finals with the club in 1903 and 1904. He also played for Halifax in their defeat in the inaugural Yorkshire Cup final in 1905.

== Death and legacy ==
Williams died in April 1936. His burial took place in Cardiff.

Williams was nominated as one of 13 former Cardiff-born players to be honoured on a new monument to be built in Cardiff Bay. His name plaque is on the plinth of the Statue of Billy Boston, Clive Sullivan and Gus Risman.
