= John Burnett (rugby league) =

English rugby league footballer (1935–2022)

Personal information
- Born: 1935; Halifax, England
- Died: 27 December 2022 (aged 87)

Playing information
- Position: Centre
Club
Years	Team	Pld	T	G	FG	P
1954–67	Halifax	344	130	0	0	390
1955–56	→ Blackpool Borough (loan)	6	1	0	0	3
	Total	350	131	0	0	393
Representative
Years	Team	Pld	T	G	FG	P
1958–60	Yorkshire	6	1	0	0	3

John Burnett (1935 – 29 December 2022) was an English professional rugby league footballer who played in the 1950s and 1960s. He played at representative level for Yorkshire, and at club level for Halifax as a centre.

== Background ==
Burnett was born in Halifax, West Riding of Yorkshire, England, he was a pupil at Battinson Road School (now Mount Pellon Primary Academy), Halifax, and he was the chairman of The Shay Redevelopment Appeal committee that had the task of raising £140,000 towards the cost of the first stage redevelopment c. 1998.

== Playing career ==
=== Club career ===
Burnett made his début for Halifax on Saturday 16 January 1954, and he played his last match for Halifax on Saturday 15 April 1967. During his early career, he spent time on loan at Blackpool Borough.

He won his first trophy with Halifax in the 1963–64 Yorkshire Cup final. At the end of the following season, he played, and was captain, in Halifax's 15–7 victory over St. Helens in the 1964–65 Championship Final at Station Road, Swinton on Saturday 22 May 1965.

=== Representative honours ===
Burnett won caps for Yorkshire while at Halifax.

== Honours ==
Burnett was a Halifax RLFC Hall of Fame inductee.

== Death ==
Burnett died on 27 December 2022, at the age of 87.
