= Simon Brown (rugby league) =

English rugby league footballer

Personal information
- Born: 23 June 1989 (age 35)
- Height: 5 ft 10 in (1.78 m)
- Weight: 14 st 9 lb (93 kg)

Playing information
- Position: Stand-off, Scrum-half
Club
Years	Team	Pld	T	G	FG	P
	Leeds Rhinos	0	0	0	0	0
2010(loan)	→ Doncaster	16	1	40	0	84
2010–12	Sheffield Eagles	61	4	231	4	482
2013	York City Knights	20	1	11	1	49
2014	Halifax	11	1	6	0	10
2014(loan)	→ Batley Bulldogs	3	0	0	0	1
2015–16	Hunslet Hawks	44	3	118	4	252
2017	Sheffield Eagles	26	2	75	0	158
2018	Sheffield Eagles	15	4	9	1	35
2019	Dewsbury Rams	11	1	0	0	4
2020(loan)	→ Hunslet	11	0	1	0	0
2021	Hunslet	0	0	0	0	0
	Total	218	17	491	10	1075
- Source: As of 30 December 2020

Simon Brown (born 23 June 1989) is a professional rugby league footballer who last played as a stand-off or scrum-half for Hunslet in League 1.

== Early career ==
Brown was a member of the Leeds Rhinos Academy and represented England at youth team level.

=== Leeds Rhinos ===
Brown played for Doncaster on loan from the Leeds Rhinos in 2010.

=== Sheffield Eagles ===
Midway through the 2010 season he joined Sheffield. He spent two and a half seasons with the South Yorkshire club before leaving at the end of the 2012 season. In 2012 he won the Championship Grand Final against Featherstone Rovers.

=== York City Knights ===
Brown joined the York City Knights ahead of the 2013 season.

=== Halifax RLFC ===
He spent only a single season at York before moving to Halifax for the 2014 season.

During the 2014 season he spent time on loan at the Batley Bulldogs.

At the conclusion of his contract at ’Fax he moved to the Hunslet Hawks. He spent the 2015 and 2016 seasons at Hunslet.

=== Return to Sheffield ===
Brown returned to the Sheffield Eagles for the 2017 season. During this period the Eagles were forced to play in Wakefield at their Belle Vue ground.

He left the club during a period of financial uncertainty ahead of the 2018 season. Brown came out of retirement to play for the Eagles during their 2018 Championship campaign.

=== Hunslet RLFC ===
On 4 Dec 2019 it was announced that Brown had joined Hunslet RLFC on a permanent 1-year deal after the earlier loan period from Dewsbury Rams.
