= David Jones (Welsh rugby) =

Wales international rugby league footballer

Personal information
- Full name: David Jones
- Born: Wales

Playing information

Rugby union
Club
| Years | Team | Pld | T | G | FG | P |
|---|---|---|---|---|---|---|
| | Maesteg RFC |

Rugby league
- Position: Wing, Centre
Club
| Years | Team | Pld | T | G | FG | P |
|---|---|---|---|---|---|---|
| 1965–71 | Halifax | 202 | 69 | 10 | 0 | 227 |
Representative
| Years | Team | Pld | T | G | FG | P |
| 1968–69 | Wales | 2 | 1 | 0 | 0 | 3 |

David Jones (born 24 June 1944) is a Welsh former rugby union and professional rugby league footballer who played in the 1960s. He played club level rugby union (RU) for Maesteg RFC, and representative level rugby league (RL) for Wales, and at club level for Halifax, from 1965 to 1971, as a wing or centre.

== Playing career ==
=== Club career ===
Jones joined English rugby league club Halifax in 1965 from rugby union club Maesteg RFC. He played on the wing for Halifax in their 12–35 defeat in the 1965–66 Championship final against St Helens.

=== International honours ===
David Jones won 2 caps for Wales (RL) in 1968–1969 while at Halifax.
