= Jack Beames =

GB & Wales international rugby league footballer

Personal information
- Full name: John Robert Beames
- Born: 1 March 1890 Aberbeeg, Wales
- Died: fourth ¼ 1970 (aged 80) Halifax, England

Playing information

Rugby union
Club
Years	Team	Pld	T	G	FG	P
≤1912–13	Newport RFC	38	1

Rugby league
- Position: Second-row
Club
Years	Team	Pld	T	G	FG	P
1913–22	Halifax	149	30	0	0	90
≤1923–≥23	Bradford Northern
	Total	149	30	0	0	90
Representative
Years	Team	Pld	T	G	FG	P
1921	Other Nationalities	1
1914–21	Wales	2	0	0	0	0
1921	Great Britain	2	0	0	0	0

John Robert Beames (1 March 1890 – fourth ¼ 1970) was a Welsh rugby union, and professional rugby league footballer who played in the 1910s and 1920s. He played club level rugby union (RU) for Newport RFC, and representative level rugby league (RL) for Great Britain, Wales and Other Nationalities, and at club level for Halifax and Bradford Northern, as a second-row.

== Background ==
Jack Beames was born in Aberbeeg, Wales, and he died aged 80 in Halifax, West Riding of Yorkshire, England.

== Rugby union playing career ==
Beames, who was born in Aberbeeg, originally played rugby union for Newport RFC, his most notable match being the club's victory over the touring South African team in 1912. In the 1912/13 season at Newport he played in 38 games scoring a single try.

== Rugby league playing career ==
=== Club career ===
Beames changed code from rugby union to rugby league when he transferred from Newport RFC to Halifax for £100 (based on increases in average earnings, this would be approximately £37,430 in 2016), he made his début for Halifax on Saturday 6 September 1913, and he played his last match for Halifax on Monday 11 December 1922.

Beames played at second-row in Halifax's 0-13 defeat by Leigh in the 1920–21 Challenge Cup Final during the 1920–21 season at The Cliff, Broughton on Saturday 30 April 1921, in front of a crowd of 25,000.

=== International honours ===
Beames won a cap for Other Nationalities (RL) while at Halifax, won 2 caps for Wales (RL) in 1914–1921 while at Halifax, and won caps for Great Britain (RL) while at Halifax in 1921 against Australia (2 matches).

== Honoured at Halifax ==
Beames died in Halifax, and is a Halifax Hall Of Fame Inductee.
