= Charles Smith (rugby) =

New Zealand international rugby union & league footballer

Personal information
- Born: 28 July 1910 New Zealand
- Died: May 1988 (aged 77) New Zealand

Playing information

Rugby union
- Position: Centre
Representative
Years	Team	Pld	T	G	FG	P
	Hawkes Bay
	New Zealand Maori

Rugby league
- Position: Wing, Centre
Club
Years	Team	Pld	T	G	FG	P
1936	Streatham and Mitcham
1936–48	Halifax	318	62	0	0	186
	Total	318	62	0	0	186
Representative
Years	Team	Pld	T	G	FG	P
1937	British Empire XIII	1

Charles Smith (28 July 1910 – May 1988) was a New Zealand rugby union and professional rugby league footballer who played in the 1930s and 1940s. He played representative level rugby union (RU) for New Zealand Maori and Hawkes Bay, as a centre, switching codes in 1935. He played representative level rugby league (RL) for British Empire XIII, and at club level for Streatham and Mitcham and Halifax, as a wing, or centre.

== Playing career ==
=== Rugby union ===
Smith represented the New Zealand Maori on their tour in Australia 1935.

=== Rugby league ===
In September 1935, Smith switched codes, travelling to England to play rugby league.

Smith made his début for Halifax on Saturday 5 December 1936, and made his last appearance on Saturday 25 December 1948.

Smith played at centre in Halifax's 2–9 defeat by Leeds in the 1940–41 Challenge Cup Final during the 1940–41 season at Odsal, Bradford, in front of a crowd of 28,500.

He represented British Empire XIII (RL) in 15–0 victory over France at Stade Buffalo, Paris on Monday 1 November 1937.

== Honoured at Halifax ==
Smith is a Halifax Hall of Fame Inductee. He died in May 1988.
