= Gareth Potts (rugby league) =

English rugby league footballer

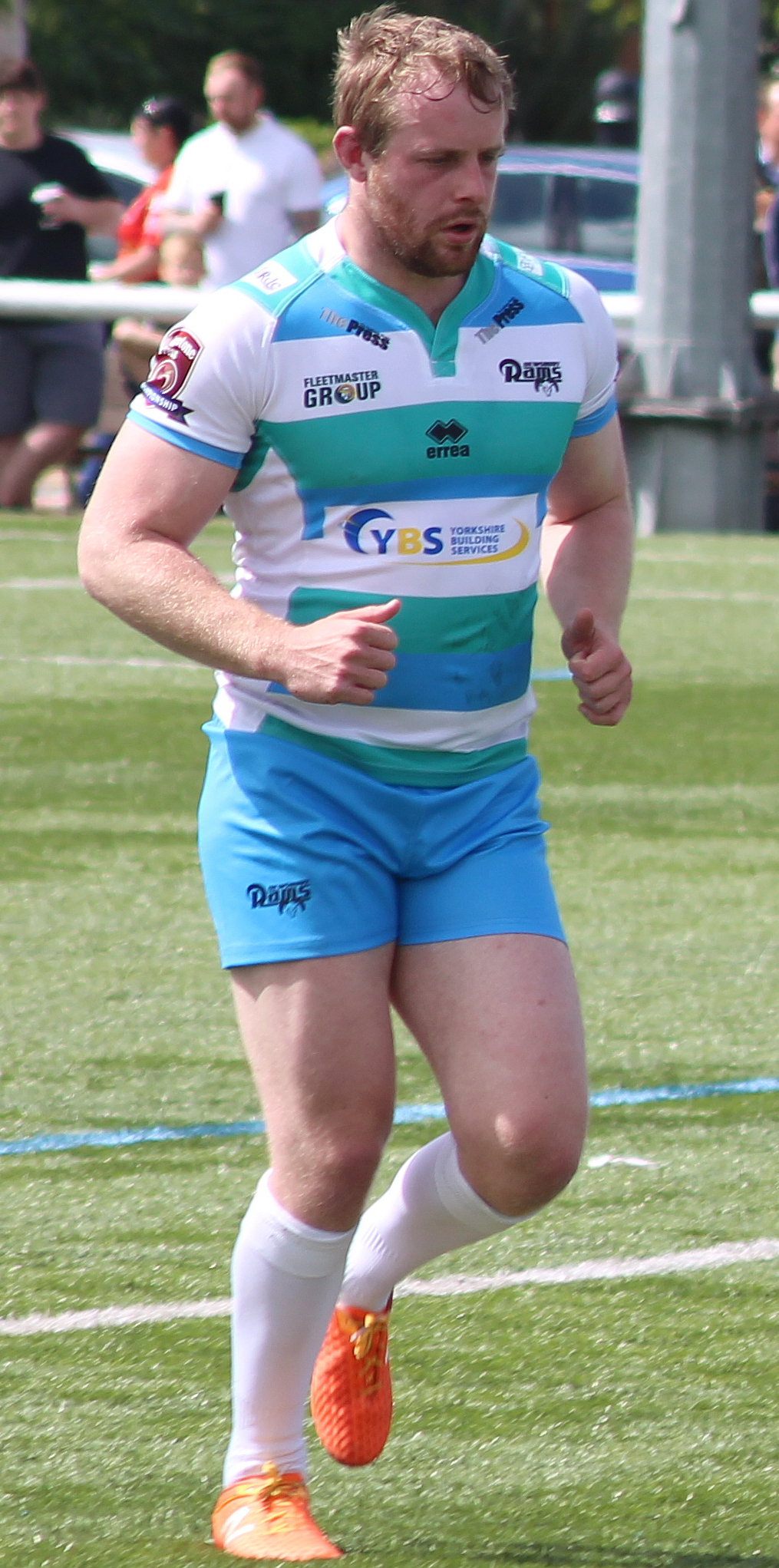

Personal information
- Full name: Gareth Potts
- Born: 25 July 1990 (age 35) England
- Height: 5 ft 10 in (1.78 m)
- Weight: 13 st 4 lb (84 kg)

Playing information
- Position: Wing
Club
Years	Team	Pld	T	G	FG	P
2011(loan)	→ Doncaster	10	7	0	0	28
2012–13	Batley Bulldogs	46	28	0	0	112
2015–16	Halifax	40	23	2	0	96
2017–18	Dewsbury Rams	29	13	0	0	52
2019–	Hunslet	5	7	0	0	28
	Total	130	78	2	0	316
- Source: As of 12 June 2017

Gareth Potts (born 25 July 1990) is an English professional rugby league footballer who plays for the Hunslet in League 1. He plays as a wing.

== Background ==
Potts was born in England.

== Career ==
Potts was in the junior systems at the Wakefield Trinity Wildcats and spent time on loan at Doncaster. He has previously played for the Batley Bulldogs.

He has previously played Halifax in the Kingstone Press Championship.
