= Danny Halliwell =

English rugby league footballer

Personal information
- Full name: Daniel Halliwell
- Born: 23 March 1981 (age 44)

Playing information
- Position: Wing, Centre, Second-row
Club
Years	Team	Pld	T	G	FG	P
2000–01	Halifax	9	2	0	0	8
2002	Keighley Cougars (loan)	4	3	0	0	12
2002	Wakefield Trinity Wildcats	3	0	0	0	0
2002–03	Halifax	17	2	0	0	8
2002	→ Warrington Wolves (loan)	10	8	0	0	32
2004–06	Leigh Centurions	5	3	0	0	12
2007	Salford City Reds	5	0	0	0	0
2008–09	Oldham	48+3	28	20	0	152
2009–10	Barrow Raiders
2010	Blackpool Panthers
2013	Oxford Cavaliers	12	1	0	4
2014	Swinton Lions	5	1	0	0	4
	Total	121	48	20	4	228

Danny Halliwell (born 23 March 1981) is a former professional rugby league footballer who played in the 2000s and 2010s. He played at club level in the Super League for Halifax (two spells), the Wakefield Trinity Wildcats, the Warrington Wolves (loan), the Leigh Centurions and the Salford City Reds, and in the Championships for the Keighley Cougars (loan), Oldham, the Blackpool Panthers, the Barrow Raiders, the Oxford Cavaliers and the Swinton Lions, and for the Leigh Miners Rangers ARLFC, as a wing, centre, or second-row.

== Background ==
Danny Halliwell is the grandson of the rugby league prop who played the 1960s, and 1970s for Swinton (also coach 1978–1979), Salford and Warrington; Ken Halliwell.
