= Lee Milner =

Scotland rugby player (born 1977)

Personal information
- Full name: Lee Milner
- Born: 26 February 1977 (age 49)

Playing information
- Position: Second-row
Club
Years	Team	Pld	T	G	FG	P
1994–99	Huddersfield Giants
1999	Halifax	1	0	0	0	0
	Total	1	0	0	0	0
Representative
Years	Team	Pld	T	G	FG	P
1996	Scotland	1	0	0	0	0

Lee Milner (born 26 February 1977) is a former Scotland international rugby league footballer who played in the 1990s. He played at club level for the Huddersfield Giants and Halifax as a second-row.

== International honours ==
Lee Milner won a cap for Scotland while at Huddersfield Giants, and was man of the match in the 26–6 victory over Ireland at Firhill Stadium, Glasgow on Tuesday 6 August 1996. Lee Milner was a Great Britain academy Oceania tourist of New Zealand in 1996.
