= Tony Halmshaw =

English rugby league footballer (1946–2023)

Personal information
- Full name: David Anthony Halmshaw
- Born: 25 April 1946; Dewsbury, England
- Died: 24 June 2023 (aged 77); Dewsbury, England

Playing information
- Position: Loose forward
Club
Years	Team	Pld	T	G	FG	P
1966–73	Halifax	190	18	8	0	70
1973–77	Rochdale Hornets	104	5	6	1	29
1977–78	Hunslet RLFC
1978–80	Castleford	17	0	0	0	0
1980–81	Huddersfield	19	0	0	0	0
1981–82	Dewsbury	14	0	0	0	0
	Total	344	23	14	1	99
Representative
Years	Team	Pld	T	G	FG	P
1971–72	Yorkshire	4	1	0	0	3
1971	Great Britain	1	0	0	0	0

David Anthony Halmshaw (25 April 1946 – 24 June 2023) was an English former professional rugby league footballer who played in the 1970s and 1980s. He played at representative level for Great Britain, and at club level for Halifax, Rochdale Hornets and Castleford, as a loose forward.

== Background ==
Tony Halmshaw was born in Dewsbury, West Riding of Yorkshire, England.

== Playing career ==
=== Club career ===
Halmshaw started his professional career with Halifax, joining from junior club Shaw Cross. He played loose forward in Halifax's 22–11 victory over Wakefield Trinity in the 1971–72 Player's No.6 Trophy Final at Odsal Stadium, Bradford on Saturday 22 January 1972.

In March 1973, Halmshaw was signed by Rochdale Hornets. He played loose forward in Rochdale Hornets' 16–27 defeat by Warrington in the 1973–74 Player's No.6 Trophy Final at Central Park, Wigan on Saturday 9 February 1974.

Towards the end of his career, he joined his hometown club Dewsbury as a player-coach.

=== International honours ===
Tony Halmshaw won a cap for Great Britain while at Halifax in 1971 against New Zealand.
