= David Wrench (rugby league) =

English rugby league footballer

Personal information
- Full name: David Wrench
- Born: 3 January 1979 (age 47) Keighley, West Yorkshire, England

Playing information
- Position: Prop, Second-row, Loose forward
Club
Years	Team	Pld	T	G	FG	P
1999–01	Leeds	26	0	0	0	0
2002–06	Wakefield Trinity	90	6	0	0	24
2006(loan)	→ Halifax
2007–10	Halifax	55	6	0	0	24
	Total	171	12	0	0	48
- As of 25 May 2021

David Wrench (born 3 January 1979) is an English former rugby league footballer who played for Leeds Wakefield and Halifax. Wrench started his career with Leeds and was a part of the infamous 1998 academy championship side. He then made his first senior appearance for Leeds in 1998 but it was not until 2001 where he broke through and made 21 appearances that season. Following this, Wrench signed For Wakefield and played 96 games for the club. He signed for Halifax originally in the 2006 season on loan from Wakefield Trinity Wildcats but after a successful loan period his move was made permanent in Autumn 2006. Wrench can operate at both prop and second-row.
