= Damian Ball =

English rugby league footballer and coach

Personal information
- Full name: Damian Ball
- Born: 14 July 1975 (age 50)
- Died: Halifax, West Yorkshire, England

Playing information
- Position: Loose forward
Club
Years	Team	Pld	T	G	FG	P
1995–97	York	68	27	14	0	136
1998–01	Dewsbury Rams	123	42	3	2	176
2002–03	Rochdale Hornets	58	13	0	1	53
2004	York City Knights	22	10	3	0	46
2004	Hull Kingston Rovers	8	2	0	0	8
2005–08	Halifax RLFC	73	25	0	0	100
	Total	352	119	20	3	519

Damian Ball (born 14 July 1975) was a British rugby league footballer and coach.

Ball was the captain at Halifax from 2006. He usually played at loose forward, but could also operate at second row. He signed for Halifax after a six-month sabbatical from the game. His previous clubs were Dewsbury Rams, Hull Kingston Rovers, Rochdale Hornets and York City Knights.

As well as his part-time involvement in Halifax, he had also held teaching posts at the North Halifax Grammar School, Halifax and The Brooksbank School, Elland, West Yorkshire, England.

Damian was also named 2008 assistant coach under new boss Matt Calland.
