= Andrew Murdison =

Scottish rugby footballer

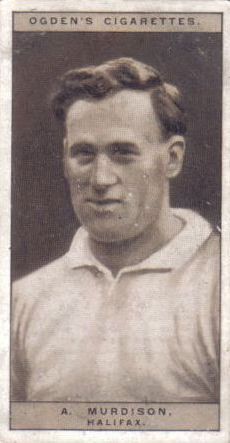
- Ogden's Cigarette card featuring Andrew Murdison

Personal information
- Full name: Andrew Murdison
- Born: 16 May 1898 Lauder, Scottish Borders, Scotland
- Died: 1968 (aged 70) Earlston, Scotland

Playing information

Rugby union
- Position: Centre
Club
Years	Team	Pld	T	G	FG	P
≤1923–23	Galashiels RFC
Representative
Years	Team	Pld	T	G	FG	P
1920s	Scottish Borders

Rugby league
Club
Years	Team	Pld	T	G	FG	P
1923–29	Halifax	174	92	135	0	546
Representative
Years	Team	Pld	T	G	FG	P
1926	Other Nationalities	1	1	0	0	3

Andrew Murdison (16 May 1898 – 1968) was a Scottish rugby union and professional rugby league footballer who played in the 1920s. He played representative level rugby union (RU) for Scottish Borders, and at club level for Galashiels RFC (captain), as a centre, and representative level rugby league (RL) for Other Nationalities, and at club level for Halifax.

== Early life and family ==
Murdison was born in Lauder, Scottish Borders, to Robert Hope Murdison, a plumber, and Elizabeth Copeland Forbes. His family was active in rugby union. His father and an uncle, Thomas B. Murdison, both played for Galashiels RFC in the 1890s. Tom Murdison was permanently suspended for a notorious incident at Mossilee. In later life, Andrew Murdison joined his father's plumbing business in Earlston.

== Rugby league ==
In 1923, moved south to England to become a rugby league professional, signing for Halifax.

Murdison won one cap for Other Nationalities while at Halifax in 1926.

== Contemporaneous article extract ==
"A. Murdison. Halifax (Northern Rugby league.) "A. Murdison is one of the club's finest discoveries. Born in Lowden (sic), he became connected with the Galashiels Rugby Union club, and quickly won distinction as a centre three-quarter with wonderful anticipation, and before turning professional, represented his county, besides being captain of his side. He possesses great speed, and is a strong straight runner. He played in the trial games for the last Australian tour in 1924, and only just missed securing a place."
