= Gavin Clinch =

Ireland international rugby league footballer

Personal information
- Born: 13 September 1974 (age 51) Australia

Playing information
- Position: Scrum-half
Club
Years	Team	Pld	T	G	FG	P
1995	Cronulla Sharks	1	1	0	0	4
1996	Penrith Panthers	10	0	0	0	0
1997	St. George Dragons	16	2	0	0	8
1998–99	Halifax	41	21	31	0	151
1999	Wigan Warriors	12	4	12	0	40
2000	Huddersfield-Sheffield	21	5	0	1	21
2001–02	Halifax	57	11	14	0	62
2003–04	Salford City Reds	26	1	0	1	5
	Total	184	45	57	2	291
Representative
Years	Team	Pld	T	G	FG	P
2000–01	Ireland	3	2	0	0	8
- Source: As of 13 April 2012

Gavin Clinch (born 13 September 1974) is a former Ireland international rugby league footballer who played as a scrum-half in the 1990s and 2000s.

Clinch played at representative level for Ireland, and at club level for Cronulla-Sutherland Sharks, Penrith Panthers, St. George Dragons, Halifax (two spells), Wigan Warriors, Huddersfield-Sheffield Giants, and Salford City Reds.

Gavin Clinch moved to Halifax at the beginning of 1998's Super League III season and was that year selected in the Super League Dream Team. He later won international caps for Ireland while at Huddersfield-Sheffield Giants, and Halifax 2000–2001 1-cap plus 1 as substitute.

In recent times, ‘The Pinch’, pioneered the Bosco Bulldogs Reserve Grade side to a Premiership in the 2023 Cronulla Sharks JRL Competition, finishing the year undefeated.
