= Said Tamghart =

Former France international rugby league footballer

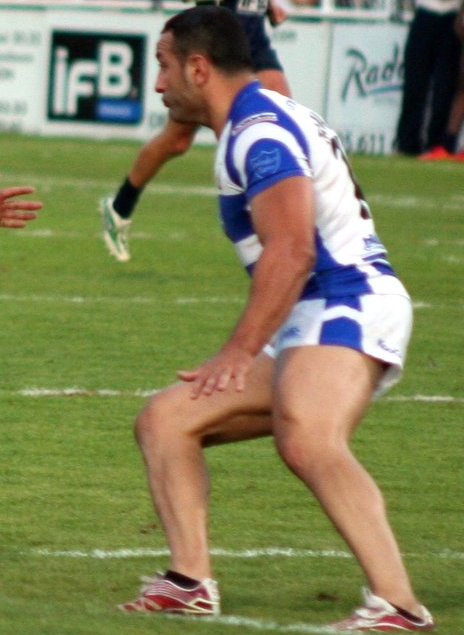

Personal information
- Born: 13 May 1980 (age 46)
- Height: 6 ft 0 in (1.83 m)
- Weight: 15 st 2 lb (96 kg)

Playing information
- Position: Prop, Second-row
Club
Years	Team	Pld	T	G	FG	P
	RC Carpentras XIII
	Avignon Bisons
	UTC
2006–08	Oldham
2009–10	Halifax	33	8	0	0	40
	Total	33	8	0	0	40
Representative
Years	Team	Pld	T	G	FG	P
2004	France	1	0	0	0	0
- Source: As of 23 August 2010

Said Tamghart is a rugby league footballer who played in the 2000s and 2010s. He played at the representative level for France, and at club level for RC Carpentras XIII, Avignon Bisons, UTC, Oldham and Halifax, as a prop or second-row.

== Background ==
Tamghart was born on the 13th May 1980, and is of French-Algerian extraction.

== Playing career ==
Tamghart has previously played for Carpentras XIII, Avignon Bisons and UTC in the French Elite One Championship.

In 2008 he played for the Oldham R.L.F.C. in National League Two and in 2009 joined Halifax on a two-year contract.
