= Ben Beevers =

English rugby league footballer

Personal information
- Full name: Graham Beevers
- Born: 14 June 1961 (age 64) Halifax, England

Playing information
- Position: Prop
Club
Years	Team	Pld	T	G	FG	P
1980–91	Halifax	141	2	0	0	8
1991–92	London Crusaders
1992–93	Batley	10	0	0	0	0
1993	Bramley	2	0	0	0	0
	Total	153	2	0	0	8

Graham "Ben" Beevers (born 14 June 1961) is a former professional rugby league footballer who played in the 1980s. He played at club level for Ovenden ARLFC and Halifax, as a prop, or second-row.

== Playing career ==
=== Halifax ===
Beevers was at Halifax for ten years which included ten appearances (two as a substitute) in Halifax's victory in the Championship during the 1985–86 season.

Beevers played at prop (replaced by substitute Neil James) in Halifax's 19-18 victory over St Helens in the 1987 Challenge Cup Final during the 1986–87 season at Wembley Stadium, London on Saturday 2 May 1987.

He was inducted into the Halifax Hall of Fame
