= Roy Hawksley =

English rugby league footballer

Personal information
- Full name: Roy Hawksley
- Born: 9 February 1943 (age 83) Lupset?, Wakefield district, England

Playing information
- Weight: 13 st 0 lb (83 kg)
- Position: Hooker
Club
Years	Team	Pld	T	G	FG	P
1961–65	Wakefield Trinity	23	2	0	0	6
1966–71	Doncaster	171	3	0	0	9
1971–75	Halifax	126	5	0	0	15
1975–≥75	Salford	11	2			6
1975	Doncaster	1	0	0	0	0
	Total	332	12	0	0	36

Roy Hawksley (born 9 February 1943) is an English former professional rugby league footballer who played in the 1960s and 1970s. He played at club level for Wakefield Trinity, Doncaster (two spells), Halifax, and Salford, as a hooker.

== Background ==
Roy Hawksley's birth was registered in Wakefield district, West Riding of Yorkshire, England.

== Playing career ==
=== County Cup Final appearances ===
Hawksley played hooker in Salford's 7–16 defeat by Widnes in the 1975–76 Lancashire Cup Final during the 1975–76 season at Central Park, Wigan on Saturday 4 October 1975.

=== Player's No.6 Trophy Final appearances ===
Hawksley played hooker in Halifax's 22–11 victory over Wakefield Trinity in the 1971–72 Player's No.6 Trophy Final during the 1971–72 season at Odsal Stadium, Bradford on Saturday 22 January 1972.

=== Club career ===
Hawksley made his début for Wakefield Trinity during January 1961, and he played his last match for Wakefield Trinity during the 1965–66 season

== Contemporaneous Article Extract ==
"Outlines - Roy Hawksley - Signed last season, Roy is a promising young hooker who should eventually fare extremely well in the game. Indeed his present skills may well be judged by his past records. For our own Trinity juniors he did grand work before joining the senior club, whilst he had previously been a member of the highly successful Snapethorpe School side which carried all before it a few years ago in heading the Wakefield Schools’ League and winning the Yorkshire Cup. Whilst at school he also had the honour of playing for the Wakefield City team and for Yorkshire County, always as hooker Whilst his scrum play is outstanding he is also quite active in the open. At the age of 19 he still has time to develop physically and should have a most satisfying career. Height, 5 ft. 9in., weight, 13 stones."
