= Billy Pratt (rugby league) =

English rugby league footballer

Personal information
- Full name: William Pratt
- Born: third ¼ 1932 Leeds South district, England
- Died: 18 February 2009 (aged 76) Shipley, West Yorkshire, England

Playing information
- Position: Scrum-half
Club
Years	Team	Pld	T	G	FG	P
1952–58	Leeds	73	5	0	0	15
1958–59	Halifax	25	3	0	0	9
	Total	98	8	0	0	24

William Pratt (1932 – 18 February 2009) was an English professional rugby league footballer who played in the 1950s. He played at club level for Leeds and Halifax, as a scrum-half.

== Background ==
Billy Pratt's birth was registered in Leeds South, West Riding of Yorkshire, England, and he died aged 76 in Shipley, West Yorkshire, England.

== Club career ==
Billy Pratt made his début for Leeds against Wakefield Trinity at Belle Vue, Wakefield on Wednesday 2 April 1952, he missed the majority of the 1952–53 season while on military service, the consistent form of Leeds' regular scrum-half; Jeff Stevenson, meant that before the start of the 1958–59 season Billy Pratt was transferred to Halifax. Keith McLellan, George Broughton Jr. and Joe Anderson also left the Leeds before the start of the 1958–59 season.

=== Notable tour matches ===
Billy Pratt played, and scored a try in Leeds' 18-13 victory over Australia in the 1956–57 Kangaroo tour of Great Britain and France match at Headingley Stadium in October 1956, as of 2017 this is the last time Leeds have beaten Australia.
