= Hugh Duffy (rugby) =

Scotland international rugby union & rugby league footballer

Personal information
- Full name: Hugh Duffy
- Born: 1 April 1934 Shotts, North Lanarkshire, Scotland
- Died: 30 December 2017 (aged 83)

Playing information

Rugby union
- Position: Flanker
Club
Years	Team	Pld	T	G	FG	P
1951–55	Jed-Forest RFC
Representative
Years	Team	Pld	T	G	FG	P
1955	Scotland	1

Rugby league
- Position: Forward
Club
Years	Team	Pld	T	G	FG	P
1955–62	Salford	241	51	2	0	155
1962–66	Halifax	97	6	0	0	18
	Total	338	57	2	0	173

Hugh Duffy (1 April 1934 – 30 December 2017) was a Scottish rugby union and professional rugby league footballer who played in the 1950s and 1960s. He played representative level rugby union (RU) for Scotland, making his début in a five nations international match against France in Paris, and at club level for Jed Thistle, and Jed-Forest RFC, as a Flanker, and club level rugby league (RL) for Salford and Halifax, as a forward. Duffy was one of the first XV Scottish rugby union internationals to move to rugby league.

== Background ==
Hugh Duffy was born in Shotts, North Lanarkshire, Scotland, he was the landlord, with his wife Irene (née Gregory), of the now demolished 'Star Inn' at the corner of Broughton Road/Garden Street, Greengate, Salford, he died aged 83, his funeral took place at St Joseph's Roman Catholic Church, Woodford Lane, Winsford, at 10.00am, on Tuesday 9 January 2018, followed by interment at Wharton Cemetery, Wharton.

== Playing career ==
=== International honours ===
Hugh Duffy won a cap for Scotland (RU) while at Jed-Forest RFC in 1955 against France at Stade Colombes, Paris on Saturday 8 January 1955.

=== Championship final appearances ===
Hugh Duffy was a non-playing interchange/substitute in Halifax's 15–7 victory over St. Helens in the 1964–65 Championship Final during the 1964–65 season at Station Road, Swinton on Saturday 22 May 1965, and played as an interchange/substitute in the 12–35 defeat by St. Helens in the 1965–66 Championship Final during the 1965–66 season at Station Road, Swinton on Saturday 28 May 1966, in front of a crowd of 30,634.

=== County Cup Final appearances ===
Hugh Duffy played in Halifax's 10–0 victory over Featherstone Rovers in the 1963 Yorkshire Cup Final during the 1963–64 season at Belle Vue, Wakefield on Saturday 2 November 1963.

=== Notable tour matches ===
Hugh Duffy played in Salford's 5–21 defeat by New Zealand, at The Willows, Salford on 6 November 1955, this was the first Salford match to ever be televised, and played in the 20–22 defeat by Australia, during the 1959–60 Kangaroo tour match at The Willows, Salford on 26 September 1959, in front of a crowd of 11,000.

=== Club career ===
Hugh Duffy played a trial match under the pseudonym 'McDonald' for Salford against Oldham at Watersheddings, Oldham on Tuesday 28 December 1954, he declined contract offers from Huddersfield and Oldham, and signed for Salford, he made his début for Salford against Liverpool City, at The Willows, Salford on Saturday 5 February 1955, he kicked his solitary goal for Salford in the match against Blackpool Borough at The Willows, Salford in 1962, he was transferred from Salford to Halifax in exchange for Halifax's centre; Ernie Critchley plus £600 (based on increases in average earnings, this would be approximately £24,830 in 2016).
