= Scott Wilson (rugby league, born 1962) =

Rugby league player

Personal information
- Full name: Scott Wilson
- Born: 23 September 1962 (age 62)

Playing information
- Position: Wing, Centre
Club
Years	Team	Pld	T	G	FG	P
1982–89	Halifax	101	18	0	0	72

Scott Wilson is a former professional rugby league footballer who played in the 1980s. He played at club level for Halifax, as a wing or centre.

== Playing career ==
=== Championship appearances ===
Wilson played in 33 (1 as a substitute) and scored 5 tries in Halifax's total of 37 games (30 League plus 7 in Cup competitions) in Halifax's victory in the Championship during the 1985–86 season.

=== Challenge Cup Final appearances ===
Wilson played on the wing in Halifax's 19–18 victory over St. Helens in the 1987 Challenge Cup Final during the 1986–87 season at Wembley Stadium, London on Saturday 2 May 1987, in front of a crowd of 91,267.
