= Charlie Renilson =

Scottish rugby player

Charles Renilson
Personal information
- Full name: Charles Waugh Renilson
- Born: 14 September 1938 (age 87) Edinburgh, Scotland

Playing information

Rugby union
Club
Years	Team	Pld	T	G	FG	P
1957–57	Jed-Forest RFC

Rugby league
- Position: Second-row, Loose forward
Club
Years	Team	Pld	T	G	FG	P
1957–69	Halifax	302	70	19	0	248
1969–71	Newtown	54	6	0	0	18
1972	Eastern Suburbs	1	0	0	0	0
	Total	357	76	19	0	266
Representative
Years	Team	Pld	T	G	FG	P
≤1965–≥65	Commonwealth XIII	≥1
1965–68	Great Britain	8	1	0	0	3

Charles "Charlie" W. Renilson (born 14 September 1938) is a Scottish former rugby union, and professional rugby league footballer who played in the 1950s, 1960s and 1970s, serving in the Duke of Wellington's Regiment. He played club level rugby union (RU) for Jed-Forest RFC, and representative level rugby league (RL) for Great Britain and Commonwealth XIII, and at club level for Halifax, Newtown and Eastern Suburbs as a second-row or loose forward.

== Playing career ==
=== Halifax ===
Renilson played in Halifax's 15–7 victory over St. Helens in the Rugby Football League Championship Final during the 1964–65 season at Station Road, Swinton on Saturday 22 May 1965.

Renilson played loose forward, and scored a try in Halifax's 10–0 victory over Featherstone Rovers in the 1963 Yorkshire Cup Final during the 1963–64 season at Belle Vue, Wakefield on Saturday 2 November 1963.

Charlie Renilson's Testimonial match at Halifax took place in 1968.

=== International honours ===
Renilson represented Commonwealth XIII while at Halifax in 1965 against New Zealand at Crystal Palace National Recreation Centre, London on Wednesday 18 August 1965,

He also won caps for Great Britain while at Halifax in 1965 against New Zealand, in 1967 against Australia (sub), in 1968 against France (2 matches), in the 1968 Rugby League World Cup against Australia, France and New Zealand, and in 1968 against France.

== Honoured at Halifax ==
Charlie Renilson is a Halifax Hall of Fame inductee.

== Personal life ==
Renilson's uncle, Billy, also played rugby league for Halifax between 1925 and 1928.
