= Christopher Maye =

Rugby league player

Personal information
- Full name: Christopher Maye
- Born: 28 February 1984 (age 41)
- Height: 6 ft 3 in (191 cm)
- Weight: 14 st 8 lb (204 lb; 93 kg)

Playing information
- Position: Centre, Loose forward
Club
Years	Team	Pld	T	G	FG	P
2003	Halifax	7	0	0	0	0
≤2004–≥06	Swinton Lions	46	42	10		188
≤2006–≥06	Oldham
	Total	53	42	10	0	188
Representative
Years	Team	Pld	T	G	FG	P
2003–04	Ireland	4	0	0	0	0
- Source: As of 16 May 2012

Christopher Maye (born 28 February 1984) is a former professional rugby league footballer who played in the 2000s. He played at representative level for Ireland, and at club level for the Wigan Warriors (A-Team), St. Helens (A-Team), Halifax, the Swinton Lions and Oldham, as a centre or loose forward.

== Playing career ==
=== Club career ===
Maye was transferred from the Wigan Warriors to St. Helens.

=== International honours ===
Chris Maye won four caps (plus one as substitute) for Ireland in 2003–2004 while at St. Helens, and the Swinton Lions.

== Genealogical information ==
Chris Maye is the nephew of the rugby league footballer; Chris Joynt.
