= Neil James =

GB international rugby league footballer

Personal information
- Full name: Neil A. James
- Born: 14 February 1961; Castleford, England
- Died: 17 December 2014 (aged 53)

Playing information
- Position: Prop, Second-row
Club
Years	Team	Pld	T	G	FG	P
1979–85	Castleford	111	17	0	0	60
1985–90	Halifax	122	19	0	0	76
1988	Gold Coast-Tweed	2	0	0	0	0
1990–92	Leeds	2	0	0	0	0
1992–93	Sheffield Eagles	20	0	0	0	0
	Total	257	36	0	0	136
Representative
Years	Team	Pld	T	G	FG	P
1986	Great Britain	1	1	0	0	4

Neil James (14 February 1961 – 17 December 2014) was an English professional rugby league footballer who played in the 1980s and 1990s. He played at representative level for Great Britain, and at club level for Castleford, Halifax, Gold Coast-Tweed Giants, Leeds and Sheffield Eagles, as a prop, or second-row.

== Background ==
James was born in Castleford, West Riding of Yorkshire, England, and he died aged 53.

== Playing career ==
=== Castleford ===
James played as a right-second-row in Castleford's 2-13 defeat by Hull F.C. in the 1983 Yorkshire Cup Final during the 1983–84 season at Elland Road, Leeds on Saturday 15 October 1983.

=== Halifax ===
In 1985, James was loaned out to Halifax. The deal was later made permanent with Castleford receiving Alan Shillito and a fee of £5,000 in exchange.

James made 34-appearances (including 4 as an interchange/substitute) in the Second-row in Halifax's victory in the Championship during the 1985–86 season, scoring 3-tries in League matches and 1 in the Premiership Trophy.

James appeared as a substitute (replacing prop Ben Beevers on 70-minutes) in Halifax's 19-18 victory over St. Helens in the 1987 Challenge Cup Final during the 1986–87 season at Wembley Stadium, London on Saturday 2 May 1987, and played left-prop and scored a try in the 12-32 defeat by Wigan in the 1988 Challenge Cup Final during the 1987–88 season at Wembley Stadium, London on Saturday 30 April 1988.

In April 1990, he was signed by Leeds for a fee of £20,000.

=== International honours ===
James won a cap for Great Britain while at Halifax, playing right-second-row scored a try, and was man of the match in the 24-10 victory over France at Central Park, Wigan on Saturday 1 March 1986.
