= Terry Cook (rugby, born 1927) =

Wales dual-code rugby international footballer

Personal information
- Full name: Terence Cook
- Born: 24 June 1927 Bedwas, Wales
- Died: 18 January 2016 (aged 88)

Playing information

Rugby union
- Position: Wing
Club
Years	Team	Pld	T	G	FG	P
≤1947–48	Pontypool RFC
1948–50	Cardiff RFC
	Total	0	0	0	0	0
Representative
Years	Team	Pld	T	G	FG	P
1949	Wales	2	0	0	0	0

Rugby league
- Position: Wing
Club
Years	Team	Pld	T	G	FG	P
1950–53	Halifax	102	48	0	0	144
Representative
Years	Team	Pld	T	G	FG	P
1951–53	Wales	4	2	0	0	6

Terence "Terry" Cook (24 June 1927 – 18 January 2016) was a Welsh dual-code international rugby union, and professional rugby league footballer who played in the 1940s and 1950s. He played representative level rugby union (RU) for Wales, and at club level for Pontypool RFC and Cardiff RFC, as a wing, and representative level rugby league (RL) for Wales, and at club level for Halifax, as a wing.

== International honours ==
Cook won 4 caps for Wales (RU) in 1951–53 while at Cardiff RFC in 1949 against Scotland and Ireland, and won caps for Wales (RL) while at Halifax.
