= Colum Halpenny =

Australian rugby league footballer

Personal information
- Full name: Colum Halpenny
- Born: 25 April 1979 (age 46) Australia

Playing information
- Position: Fullback, Wing, Centre
Club
Years	Team	Pld	T	G	FG	P
2001	Parramatta Eels
2001–02	Halifax	22	12	0	0	48
2003–06	Wakefield Trinity Wildcats	111	37	0	0	148
	Total	133	49	0	0	196

Colum Halpenny (born April 25, 1979) is an Australian-Irish former professional rugby league footballer who played in the 1990s-2000s. He played at club level for Parramatta Eels, Halifax, and Wakefield Trinity Wildcats, as a fullback, wing, or centre.
