= Colin Clifft =

England international rugby league footballer

Personal information
- Full name: Colin Clifft
- Born: 16 October 1934 (age 90); Leeds North district, England

Playing information
- Position: Loose forward
Club
Years	Team	Pld	T	G	FG	P
1952–56	Wakefield Trinity	98	11	1	0	35
1956–59	Halifax	107	12	0	0	36
1959–65	Featherstone Rovers	118	14	0	0	42
	Total	323	37	1	0	113
Representative
Years	Team	Pld	T	G	FG	P
1956	England	1	1	0	0	3

Colin Clifft (born 16 October 1934) is an English former professional rugby league footballer who played in the 1950s and 1960s. He played at representative level for England, and at club level for Wakefield Trinity, Halifax, and Featherstone Rovers (vice-captain), as a loose forward.

== Background ==
Colin Clifft's birth was registered in Leeds North district, West Riding of Yorkshire, England. He is married to Beryl.

== Playing career ==
=== Club career ===
Clifft made his début for Wakefield Trinity during March 1952, he played his last match for Wakefield Trinity during the 1956–57 season, he made his début for Featherstone Rovers on Saturday 28 November 1959.

Clifft played loose forward in Featherstone Rovers' 0–10 defeat by Halifax in the 1963 Yorkshire Cup Final during the 1963–64 season at Belle Vue, Wakefield on Saturday 2 November 1963.

=== International honours ===
Clifft won a cap for England while at Wakefield Trinity in 1956 against France.
