= Harold Smith (rugby league) =

GB & England international rugby league footballer

Personal information
- Full name: Harold Smith

Playing information
- Position: Hooker
Club
Years	Team	Pld	T	G	FG	P
1920–27	Bradford Northern
1927	Halifax
1927–29	St Helens	91	0	0	0	0
	Total	91	0	0	0	0
Representative
Years	Team	Pld	T	G	FG	P
1927	England	1	0	0	0	0
1926–27	Great Britain	2	0	0	0	0

Harold Smith was an English professional rugby league footballer who played in the 1920s. He played at representative level for Great Britain and England, and at club level for Bradford Northern and Halifax, as a hooker.

== Club career ==
Smith made his first debut for Bradford Northern in January 1920. He was transferred to Halifax in February 1927 for a fee of £400. Six months later, he signed for St Helens.

Smith made 86 consecutive appearances for St Helens between 1927 and 1929, a club record that stood for over 70 years until it was surpassed by Chris Joynt.

== International honours ==
Smith won a cap for England while at Halifax in 1927 against Wales, and won caps for Great Britain while at Bradford Northern in 1926-27 against New Zealand (2 matches).
