= Andy Sewell =

British photographer

Andy Sewell (born 1978) is a British photographer, living in London. He has produced the books The Heath (2011) about Hampstead Heath in north London; Something like a Nest (2014) about "the redundancy of the ideas we have about the pastoral as they come up against modern life" in the English countryside; and Known and Strange Things Pass (2020), about transatlantic communications cables and "the deep and complex entanglement of technology with contemporary life".

== Work ==
The Heath, made over five years and self-published, shows an "affectionate ramble" on Hampstead Heath in north London. According to Sean O'Hagan writing in The Guardian, The Heath captures the "hinterland between the created and the natural [. . . ] This is a book of suggestion, a landscape of the imagination as well as a record of a real and familiar place. A classic of understated observation." Parr and Badger include it in the third volume of their photobook history.

Something like a Nest is set in farming and family surroundings in the contemporary English countryside (2009–2013). (Note: Sewell photographed in rural Suffolk, Norfolk, Lincolnshire, Yorkshire, Cambridgeshire, Essex, Devon, Wiltshire, Hertfordshire and Kent.) Lucy Davies in the British Journal of Photography wrote that "for Sewell, the English countryside seemed as much an airy, shape-shifting construct as a physical entity, often thought of in a particular, bucolic way, but as connected to 21st century global capitalism as anywhere else." O'Hagan wrote again in The Guardian that "Sewell makes us think more deeply about what the countryside means by attending to aspects of the rural landscape we often overlook, either because they do not fit our definitions or because we no longer spend enough time there to absorb the changes that have crept into our still green and pleasant, but increasingly managed and manicured, land. [. . . ] Formally, Sewell's outdoor landscapes seldom spell anything out, his eye often lighting on small details that suggest the bigger picture."

About Known and Strange Things Pass (2020), Eugénie Shinkle writes in 1000 Words: "The ostensible subject of Known and Strange Things Pass is the transatlantic communications cables linking the UK and North America. But the cables are only one thread in a web of analogy that explores what it means to be in the world at the present moment. Known and Strange Things Pass is about the deep and complex entanglement of technology with contemporary life. It's about the immediacy of touch and the commonplace miracle of action at a distance; the porosity of the boundaries that hold things apart, and the fragility of the bonds that lock them together."

Sewell also works as a photographer on commissions for clients such as newspapers, magazines and book publishers.

== Publications ==
- The Heath. Self-published, 2011. ISBN 978-0956892300. With an introduction by Sewell and a poem by Owen Shears ("Heath"). Edition of 850 copies.
- Something like a Nest. Self-published, 2014. ISBN 978-0-9568923-1-7. With text by Ben Platts-Mills.
- Known and Strange Things Pass. Marche, Italy: Skinnerboox, 2020. ISBN 978-88-94895-36-0. With essays by Eugenie Shinkle and Sewell. Edition of 800 copies.

== Collections ==
- Victoria and Albert Museum, London
- Museum of London, London
- National Science and Media Museum, Bradford
