= Dave Larder =

English rugby league player (born 1976)

Personal information
- Full name: David Larder
- Born: 5 June 1976 (age 48); England
- Height: 5 ft 10 in (1.78 m)
- Weight: 220.5 lb (100 kg)

Playing information
- Position: Second-row
Club
Years	Team	Pld	T	G	FG	P
2004–2011	Halifax Panthers
- As of 22 April 2011

Dave Larder (born 5 June 1976) is an English professional rugby league footballer who currently plays in National League One with Halifax. He is the son of rugby union defensive coach Phil Larder.

== Career ==
Larder is a highly rated second-row who turned down the offer of playing full-time rugby in the Super League with Leigh Centurions, mainly due to his work commitments. Having turned down the offer of becoming a full-time player, Larder joined Halifax in 2004, instantly becoming popular with the fans. Larder captained Halifax in the 2007 season and has continued to until the 2011 season. In the 2011 season he joined the coaching team. In 2016 he became the head coach of Huddersfield Y.M.C.A.
