= George Langhorn =

England international rugby league footballer

Personal information
- Born: 11 May 1880 Halifax, England
- Died: 7 May 1934 (aged 53)

Playing information
- Position: Forwards
Club
Years	Team	Pld	T	G	FG	P
1898–13	Halifax	413	60	16	0	208
Representative
Years	Team	Pld	T	G	FG	P
	Yorkshire	3	0	0	0	0
1905	England	1	0	0	0	0

George Henry Langhorn (c. 1881 – 7 May 1934) was an English professional rugby league footballer who played in the 1890s, 1900s and 1910s. He played at representative level for England and Yorkshire, and at club level for Halifax, as a forward.

== Background ==
George Langhorn was born in Halifax, West Riding of Yorkshire, England.

== Playing career ==
=== Club career ===
Langhorn made his début for Halifax on Saturday 1 January 1898, and he played his last match for Halifax on Saturday 18 January 1913.

Langhorn played as a forward in Halifax's 8-3 victory over Warrington in the 1903–04 Challenge Cup Final during the 1903–04 season at The Willows, Salford on Saturday 30 April 1904, in front of a crowd of 17,041.

=== Representative honours ===
Langhorn won a cap for England while at Halifax in 1905 against Other Nationalities.

Langhorn won caps for Yorkshire while at Halifax.

== Honoured at Halifax ==
George Langhorn is a Halifax Hall Of Fame Inductee.
