= Jack Scroby =

English rugby footballer and RL coach (1936–2020)

Personal information
- Born: 1936; Halifax, England
- Died: 25 April 2020 (aged 83)

Playing information
- Position: Prop, Second-row, Loose forward
Club
Years	Team	Pld	T	G	FG	P
1955–59	Bradford Northern	104	16	1	0	50
1959–70	Halifax	315	22	0	0	66
	Total	419	38	1	0	116
Representative
Years	Team	Pld	T	G	FG	P
1960–69	Yorkshire	7	0	0	0	0

Coaching information
Club
Years	Team	Gms	W	D	L	W%
1970	Huddersfield
	Halifax
	Total	0	0	0	0
Representative
Years	Team	Gms	W	D	L	W%
	Yorkshire

Jack Scroby (1936 – 25 April 2020) was an English rugby union and professional rugby league footballer who played in the 1950s, 1960s and 1970s, and coached rugby league in the 1970s. He played rugby union (RU) for Army Rugby Union and the Duke of Wellington's Regiment, and representative level rugby league (RL) for Yorkshire, and at club level for Bradford Northern and Halifax, as a prop, second-row or loose forward, and coached at representative level for Yorkshire, and at club level for Huddersfield and Halifax.

== Background ==
Jack Scroby was born in Halifax, West Riding of Yorkshire, England. After playing rugby union at junior level, he played amateur rugby league for Ovenden and Siddal before turning professional in 1955 with Bradford Northern.

== Playing career ==
Scroby played for Bradford from 1955–1959 making 104 appearances before joining Halifax for a then club record fee of £7,500. At the time Scroby was serving in the army and played for the British Army rugby union team against the Royal Navy and the Royal Air Force. During his 315 appearances for Halifax between 28 August 1959 and 28 February 1970, he scored 22 tries. He played in one Championship final - in 1965 when Halifax beat St. Helens 15–7 at Station Road, Swinton on Saturday 22 May 1965.

Scroby was capped seven times for Yorkshire.

== Coaching career ==
Scroby played his last match in February 1970, before leaving to coach Huddersfield and later returned to Halifax. Later he was Chris Anderson's assistant during the glory days of the late 1980s, and then had 10 years as the club’s timekeeper.

He also coached the Yorkshire side during the mid-1970s.

== Halifax Hall of Fame ==
Jack Scroby is a Halifax RLFC Hall of Fame inductee.
