= David Bates (rugby league) =

Ireland international rugby league footballer

Personal information
- Full name: David Bates
- Born: 23 October 1980 (age 45)

Playing information
- Height: 6 ft 2 in (188 cm)
- Position: Prop
Club
Years	Team	Pld	T	G	FG	P
2001	Hunslet
2001	Warrington Wolves	1+2	0	0	0	0
2001–02	Castleford Tigers	5	0	0	0	0
2003	Gateshead Thunder
2004	Halifax
2006	York City Knights
2007	Dewsbury Rams
	Total	8	0	0	0	0
Representative
Years	Team	Pld	T	G	FG	P
2003–06	Ireland	6

David Bates (born 23 October 1980) is a former professional rugby league footballer who played in the 2000s. He played at representative level for Ireland, and at club level for Hunslet, Warrington, Castleford, Gateshead Thunder, Halifax, York City Knights and Dewsbury, as a prop.

== International honours ==
David Bates won 3 caps for Ireland in 2003–2006 while at Gateshead Thunder, Halifax and York + 3-caps (interchange/substitute).
