= James Haley (rugby league) =

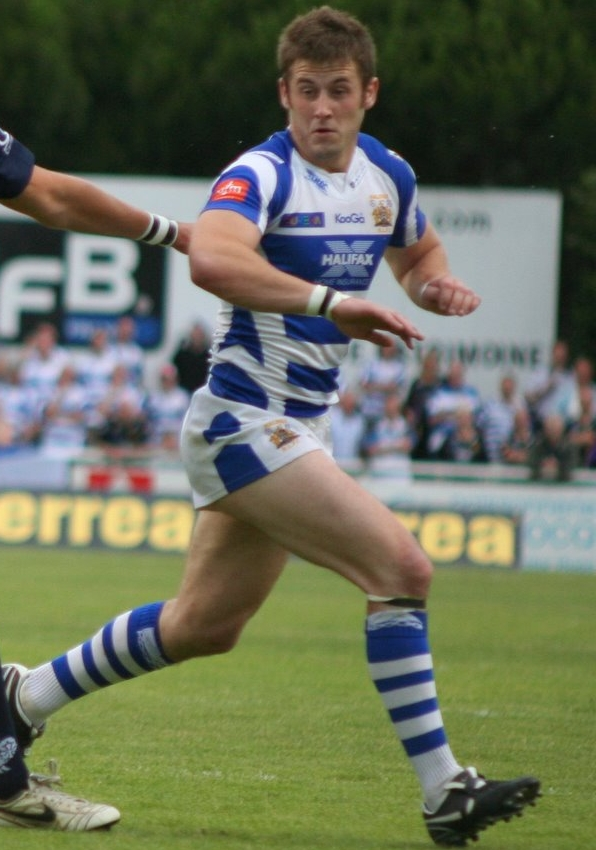

Personal information
- Born: 2 July 1985 (age 40); England
- Height: 6 ft 3 in (1.91 m)
- Weight: 15 st 11 lb (100 kg)

Playing information
- Position: Centre, Wing
Club
Years	Team	Pld	T	G	FG	P
2004–12	Halifax
2013–14	Keighley Cougars	19	13	0	0	52
	Total	19	13	0	0	52
Representative
Years	Team	Pld	T	G	FG	P
2009–11	Ireland	6	0	0	0	0
- Source: As of 13 July 2014

James Haley (born 2 July 1985) is a former professional rugby league footballer who played in the 2000s and 2010s. He played at representative level for Ireland, and at club level for Halifax and Keighley Cougars, as a wing, or centre.
