= 1903–04 Challenge Cup =

Rugby league competition

- Duration: 6 rounds
- Highest attendance: 17,041
- Winners: Halifax
- Runners-up: Warrington

The 1903–04 Challenge Cup was the 8th staging of rugby league's oldest knockout competition, the Challenge Cup.

Halifax became the second team to record back-to-back Cup wins but would not reach another final until 1921, nor win the Cup again until 1931.

== Qualifier ==
Date	Team One	Score	Team Two
05 Mar	Birkenhead	6–0	Marsh Hornets
05 Mar	Bramley	15–8	Hebden Bridge
05 Mar	Brighouse Rangers	6–0	Otley
05 Mar	Brookland	2–0	Maryport
05 Mar	Castleford	5–5	York
05 Mar	Dewsbury	18–10	Beverley
05 Mar	Holbeck	11–0	Outwood Church
05 Mar	Lancaster	0–0	Morecambe
05 Mar	Millom	7–8	Parton
05 Mar	Normanton	2–20	Wakefield Trinity
05 Mar	Pontefract	21–2	South Shields
05 Mar	Rochdale Athletic	6–28	Rochdale Hornets
05 Mar	Roose	0–34	Barrow
05 Mar	St Helens	48–5	Wigan Highfield
05 Mar	Morecambe	4–13	Lancaster
05 Mar	York	2–0	Castleford

== First round ==
Date	Team One	Score	Team Two
12 Mar	Barrow	10–10	Bramley
12 Mar	Batley	5–0	Oldham
12 Mar	Brookland	0–57	Salford
12 Mar	Dewsbury	0–15	Hunslet
12 Mar	Halifax	15–0	St Helens
12 Mar	Holbeck	17–0	Birkenhead
12 Mar	Huddersfield	0–7	Wigan
12 Mar	Hull FC	9–0	Widnes
12 Mar	Hull Kingston Rovers	2–3	Leeds
12 Mar	Lancaster	0–8	Keighley
12 Mar	Parton	0–26	Broughton Rangers
12 Mar	Pontefract	0–0	Brighouse Rangers
12 Mar	Rochdale Hornets	3–10	Leigh
12 Mar	Runcorn	0–0	Wakefield Trinity
12 Mar	Swinton	0–0	Warrington
12 Mar	York	0–8	Bradford
16 Mar - replay	Bramley	7–7	Barrow
16 Mar - replay	Brighouse Rangers	0–2	Pontefract
16 Mar - replay	Wakefield Trinity	5–7	Runcorn
16 Mar - replay	Warrington	20–0	Swinton
17 Mar - 2nd replay	Bramley	3–14	Barrow

== Second round ==
Date	Team One	Score	Team Two
19 Mar	Barrow	6–11	Halifax
19 Mar	Broughton Rangers	11–0	Runcorn
19 Mar	Holbeck	0–9	Bradford
19 Mar	Hull FC	5–23	Salford
19 Mar	Leeds	13–0	Keighley
19 Mar	Leigh	0–8	Hunslet
19 Mar	Pontefract	9–3	Batley
19 Mar	Warrington	3–0	Wigan

== Quarterfinals ==
Date	Team One	Score	Team Two
02 Apr	Broughton Rangers	0–0	Bradford
02 Apr	Halifax	8–2	Leeds
02 Apr	Pontefract	4–10	Warrington
02 Apr	Salford	2–5	Hunslet
05 Apr - replay	Bradford	0–0	Broughton Rangers
08 Apr - 2nd replay	Bradford	15–0	Broughton Rangers

== Semifinals ==
Date	Team One	Score	Team Two
16 Apr	Halifax	7–2	Hunslet
16 Apr	Warrington	3–3	Bradford
20 Apr - replay	Bradford	0–8	Warrington

== Final ==
The final was contested by the Halifax and Warrington clubs at the Willows in Salford on Saturday 30 April 1904, in front of a crowd of 17,041. Halifax retained their title beating Warrington 8–3.

30 April 1904

Halifax	8 – 3	Warrington
	Report

The Willows, Salford
Attendance: 17,041
