= List of England national rugby league team players =

The England national rugby league team represent England in international rugby league matches. The team is governed by the Rugby Football League, and is a full member of the RLIF and RLEF.

Since the team's first official match in 1904, over 700 players have been selected to represent England. The following is a list of all players who have been awarded a heritage number by the Rugby Football League.

== Players ==
Name	Caps	Tries	Goals	DGs	Points	Date of debut	Opposition
William Little	1	0	0	0	0	5 April 1904	Other Nationalities
Frank Spottiswoode	1	0	0	0	0	5 April 1904	Other Nationalities
George Dickenson	4	0	0	0	0	5 April 1904	Other Nationalities
James Lomas	13	6	21	0	60	5 April 1904	Other Nationalities
Jack Fish	3	3	2	0	13	5 April 1904	Other Nationalities
Johnnie Baxter	1	0	0	0	0	5 April 1904	Other Nationalities
Johnny Morley	1	0	0	0	0	5 April 1904	Other Nationalities
Anthony Starks	1	0	0	0	0	5 April 1904	Other Nationalities
Pat Tunney	1	0	0	0	0	5 April 1904	Other Nationalities
Jack Riley	1	0	0	0	0	5 April 1904	Other Nationalities
Billy Bulmer	1	0	0	0	0	5 April 1904	Other Nationalities
Joe Ferguson	4	1	4	0	11	5 April 1904	Other Nationalities
Bob Poole	1	0	0	0	0	2 January 1905	Other Nationalities
Jim Butterworth	1	0	0	0	0	2 January 1905	Other Nationalities
Bob Wilson	1	0	0	0	0	2 January 1905	Other Nationalities
Ervine Mosby	1	1	0	0	3	2 January 1905	Other Nationalities
Jim Leytham	5	8	7	0	38	2 January 1905	Other Nationalities
George Marsden	1	0	0	0	0	2 January 1905	Other Nationalities
Jack Preston	1	0	0	0	0	2 January 1905	Other Nationalities
Sam Walker	1	0	0	0	0	2 January 1905	Other Nationalities
George Langhorn	1	0	0	0	0	2 January 1905	Other Nationalities
Walter Morton	1	0	0	0	0	2 January 1905	Other Nationalities
Harry Feather	1	0	0	0	0	2 January 1905	Other Nationalities
Alf Boardman	1	0	0	0	0	2 January 1905	Other Nationalities
Bill Brookes	2	0	0	0	0	2 January 1905	Other Nationalities
Tom Barton	1	0	0	0	0	1 January 1906	Other Nationalities
Billy Eager	1	0	0	0	0	1 January 1906	Other Nationalities
Thomas Surman	1	0	0	0	0	1 January 1906	Other Nationalities
Thomas Hockenhull	1	0	0	0	0	1 January 1906	Other Nationalities
Fred Webster	4	0	0	0	0	1 January 1906	Other Nationalities
Harry Wilson	2	0	0	0	0	1 January 1906	Other Nationalities
Ike Bartle	1	0	0	0	0	1 January 1906	Other Nationalities
Isaac Cole	1	0	0	0	0	1 January 1906	Other Nationalities
Arthur Smith	6	0	0	0	0	1 January 1906	Other Nationalities
Dick Silcock	1	0	0	0	0	1 January 1906	Other Nationalities
Frank Lee	1	0	0	0	0	1 January 1906	Other Nationalities
Harry Taylor	2	0	0	0	0	11 January 1908	New Zealand
Andrew Hogg	2	0	0	0	0	11 January 1908	New Zealand
Percy Eccles	1	1	0	0	3	11 January 1908	New Zealand
Harry Wallace	1	0	0	0	0	11 January 1908	New Zealand
Jack Flynn	1	0	0	0	0	11 January 1908	New Zealand
Dick Padbury	4	2	0	0	6	11 January 1908	New Zealand
Asa Robinson	6	1	0	0	3	11 January 1908	New Zealand
Jack Beetham	1	0	0	0	0	11 January 1908	New Zealand
Billy Batten	15	3	1	0	11	20 April 1908	Wales
Jim Jolley	3	1	2	0	7	20 April 1908	Wales
Tom White	5	2	0	0	6	20 April 1908	Wales
Jack Spencer	1	1	0	0	3	20 April 1908	Wales
Bill Holder	1	0	0	0	0	20 April 1908	Wales
John Birch	1	1	0	0	3	20 April 1908	Wales
Silas Warwick	1	0	0	0	0	20 April 1908	Wales
Harry Gifford	4	0	0	0	0	28 December 1908	Wales
George Tyson	4	2	0	0	6	28 December 1908	Wales
Ernie Brooks	1	0	0	0	0	28 December 1908	Wales
Jimmy Hilton	2	0	1	0	2	28 December 1908	Wales
Bill Jukes	9	0	0	0	0	28 December 1908	Wales
John Higson	3	0	0	0	0	28 December 1908	Wales
Bill Longworth	4	3	0	0	9	28 December 1908	Wales
Alf Mann	4	3	0	0	9	28 December 1908	Wales
Harold Wagstaff	6	5	3	0	21	2 January 1909	Australia
Percy Holroyd	1	1	0	0	3	2 January 1909	Australia
Tommy Newbould	2	1	0	0	3	2 January 1909	Australia
Joe Miller	3	6	0	0	18	3 February 1909	Australia
Jack Lally	2	0	0	0	0	3 February 1909	Australia
Ernest Ward	1	0	0	0	0	3 March 1909	Australia
Frank Boylen	3	0	0	0	0	3 March 1909	Australia
Herbert Place	1	0	0	0	0	4 December 1909	Wales
Fred Oliver	1	0	0	0	0	4 December 1909	Wales
Fred Smith	7	2	0	0	6	4 December 1909	Wales
Jim Clampitt	6	3	0	0	9	4 December 1909	Wales
Fred Hill	1	0	0	0	0	4 December 1909	Wales
Jim Sharrock	2	0	0	0	0	9 April 1910	Wales
Joe Riley	2	1	0	0	3	9 April 1910	Wales
Albert Avery	5	1	0	0	3	9 April 1910	Wales
Billy Ward	2	0	0	0	0	9 April 1910	Wales
Dick Ramsdale	5	0	0	0	0	9 April 1910	Wales
Ellis Clarkson	3	0	0	0	0	10 December 1910	Wales
Billy Lynch	1	0	0	0	0	10 December 1910	Wales
Billy Winstanley	4	0	0	0	0	10 December 1910	Wales
Herbert Kershaw	3	1	0	0	3	10 December 1910	Wales
Jack Tomes	1	0	0	0	0	10 December 1910	Wales
William F. Kitchen	2	3	0	0	9	1 April 1911	Wales
Alf Kennedy	1	0	0	0	0	1 April 1911	Wales
Alf Wood	2	0	2	0	2	6 December 1911	Australia
Tommy Poynton	1	0	0	0	0	6 December 1911	Australia
Albert Jenkinson	3	3	0	0	9	6 December 1911	Australia
Tommy Woods	3	0	0	0	0	6 December 1911	Australia
Fred Harrison	3	0	0	0	0	6 December 1911	Australia
Stan Moorhouse	3	7	0	0	21	20 January 1912	Wales
Doug Clark	6	5	0	0	15	20 January 1912	Wales
Alf Carmichael	1	0	5	0	10	15 February 1913	Wales
Fred Gleave	1	0	0	0	0	15 February 1913	Wales
Ernest W. Jones	2	1	0	0	3	15 February 1913	Wales
Arthur Moore	1	0	0	0	0	15 February 1913	Wales
Billy Hall	2	0	0	0	0	14 February 1914	Wales
William Reid	1	1	0	0	3	14 February 1914	Wales
Tommy Milner	1	1	0	0	3	14 February 1914	Wales
Fred Longstaff	1	0	0	0	0	14 February 1914	Wales
Walter Roman	1	0	0	0	0	14 February 1914	Wales
Arthur Johnson	1	0	0	0	0	14 February 1914	Wales
Billy Rhodes	2	1	13	0	29	19 January 1921	Wales
Billy Stone	6	6	1	0	20	19 January 1921	Wales
Albert Akroyd	1	0	0	0	0	19 January 1921	Wales
Jim Owen	5	4	0	0	12	19 January 1921	Wales
Joe Brittain	4	1	0	0	3	19 January 1921	Wales
Jonty Parkin	8	4	4	0	20	19 January 1921	Wales
Joe Cartwright	6	0	0	0	0	19 January 1921	Wales
Billy Cunliffe	10	0	0	0	0	19 January 1921	Wales
Rothwell Marlor	2	0	0	0	0	19 January 1921	Wales
Herman Hilton	3	1	0	0	3	19 January 1921	Wales
Ernie Shaw	2	0	0	0	0	19 January 1921	Wales
Tom Clarkson	3	0	1	0	2	10 October 1921	Australia
Frank Todd	3	2	0	0	6	10 October 1921	Australia
Arthur Skelhorne	3	0	0	0	0	10 October 1921	Australia
Bob Taylor	7	7	0	0	21	10 October 1921	Australia
Jack Price	3	0	0	0	0	10 October 1921	Australia
Jim Tranter	2	0	0	0	0	11 December 1922	Wales
Billy Bentham	2	1	0	0	0	11 December 1922	Wales
Joe Darwell	3	0	0	0	0	11 December 1922	Wales
John Greenall	2	0	0	0	0	7 February 1923	Wales
Louis Marshall	1	0	0	0	0	7 February 1923	Wales
Syd Walmsley	2	0	2	0	4	1 November 1923	Wales
Jack Hirst	1	0	0	0	0	1 November 1923	Wales
Bill Burgess	8	4	11	0	34	1 November 1923	Wales
Bob Sloman	5	0	0	0	0	1 November 1923	Wales
Frank Gallagher	8	1	0	0	3	1 November 1923	Wales
Sid Rix	4	5	0	0	15	15 October 1924	Other Nationalities
Charlie Carr	7	9	0	0	27	15 October 1924	Other Nationalities
George Davidge	1	0	0	0	0	15 October 1924	Other Nationalities
George Broughton	1	0	0	0	0	15 October 1924	Other Nationalities
Jack Bennett	4	0	0	0	0	15 October 1924	Other Nationalities
Thomas Harris	1	0	0	0	0	15 October 1924	Other Nationalities
Ernie Knapman	1	0	3	0	6	7 February 1925	Wales
Jack Evans	5	1	0	0	3	7 February 1925	Wales
Harry Young	1	1	0	0	3	7 February 1925	Wales
Les Fairclough	10	3	0	0	9	7 February 1925	Wales
Laurie Osborne	2	0	4	0	8	7 February 1925	Wales
Stanley Langshaw	1	0	0	0	0	7 February 1925	Wales
Jim Wallace	2	2	0	0	6	7 February 1925	Wales
George Hesketh	1	0	0	0	0	7 February 1925	Wales
Alf Peacock	1	0	0	0	0	30 September 1925	Wales
Jim Brough	11	2	9	0	24	12 April 1926	Wales
Arthur Thomas	3	1	0	0	3	4 February 1926	Other Nationalities
Alf Ellaby	8	13	0	0	39	6 April 1927	Wales
Alf Frodsham	2	1	0	0	3	6 April 1927	Wales
Chris Brockbank	1	0	0	0	0	6 April 1927	Wales
Harold Bowman	4	0	0	0	0	6 April 1927	Wales
Herbert Smith	1	0	0	0	0	6 April 1927	Wales
Louis Houghton	2	0	0	0	0	6 April 1927	Wales
Albert Fildes	2	0	0	0	0	6 April 1927	Wales
Teddy Haines	1	0	0	0	0	6 April 1927	Wales
Tommy Dingsdale	1	0	0	0	0	11 January 1928	Wales
Joe Oliver	4	2	0	0	6	11 January 1928	Wales
Tom Holliday	1	0	0	0	0	11 January 1928	Wales
Nat Bentham	5	0	3	0	6	11 January 1928	Wales
Jack Miller	4	0	0	0	0	11 January 1928	Wales
Ben Halfpenny	1	0	0	0	0	11 January 1928	Wales
Martin Hodgson	9	0	10	0	20	11 January 1928	Wales
Harold Young	4	1	0	0	3	11 January 1928	Wales
Billy Dingsdale	7	11	0	0	33	14 November 1928	Wales
Bill Horton	5	2	0	0	6	14 November 1928	Wales
Tom Blinkhorn	1	2	0	0	6	20 March 1929	Other Nationalities
Arthur Atkinson	7	3	0	0	9	20 March 1929	Other Nationalities
Stan Brogden	15	4	0	0	12	20 March 1929	Other Nationalities
Jack Oster	1	0	0	0	0	20 March 1929	Other Nationalities
Arthur Binks	1	0	0	0	0	20 March 1929	Other Nationalities
William Stocks	1	0	0	0	0	7 April 1930	Other Nationalities
Billy Mercer	1	0	0	0	0	7 April 1930	Other Nationalities
Jack Woods	3	1	0	0	9	7 April 1930	Other Nationalities
Billy Kirk	1	0	0	0	0	7 April 1930	Other Nationalities
Clifford Burton	1	0	0	0	0	7 April 1930	Other Nationalities
Hector Crowther	1	0	0	0	0	7 April 1930	Other Nationalities
Charlie Glossop	1	0	0	0	0	7 April 1930	Other Nationalities
Jack Walkington	4	4	0	0	12	7 April 1930	Other Nationalities
Bryn Evans	4	1	0	0	3	7 April 1930	Other Nationalities
Samuel Gee	1	0	0	0	0	7 April 1930	Other Nationalities
Fred Kelsall	1	0	0	0	0	7 April 1930	Other Nationalities
Jimmy Hoey	1	2	5	0	16	7 April 1930	Other Nationalities
Frank Williams	1	0	0	0	0	7 April 1930	Other Nationalities
Stan Smith	6	5	0	0	15	18 March 1931	Wales
Les Adams	4	0	0	0	0	18 March 1931	Wales
Cyril Halliday	1	0	0	0	0	18 March 1931	Wales
Alf Middleton	1	0	0	0	0	18 March 1931	Wales
Thomas Banks	1	1	0	0	3	18 March 1931	Wales
Len Bowkett	1	0	1	0	2	27 January 1932	Wales
Ernest Pollard	2	1	1	0	5	27 January 1932	Wales
Joe Wright	3	0	0	0	0	27 January 1932	Wales
John Lowe	2	0	0	0	0	27 January 1932	Wales
Nat Silcock, Sr.	3	3	0	0	9	27 January 1932	Wales
Jack Feetham	1	0	0	0	0	27 January 1932	Wales
Oliver Dolan	1	0	0	0	0	27 January 1932	Wales
Len Higson	2	0	0	0	0	27 January 1932	Wales
Mick Exley	3	1	0	0	3	27 January 1932	Wales
Fred Butters	1	0	0	0	0	27 January 1932	Wales
Ernest Winter	1	0	0	0	0	30 March 1933	Other Nationalities
Jack Garvey	2	1	0	0	3	30 March 1933	Other Nationalities
Billy Little	3	2	0	0	6	30 March 1933	Other Nationalities
Jack Arkwright	5	1	3	1	11	30 March 1933	Other Nationalities
Fred Brindle	1	1	0	0	3	30 March 1933	Other Nationalities
Ken Jubb	4	1	0	0	3	31 December 1933	Australia
Ted Sadler	2	0	0	0	0	31 December 1933	Australia
Barney Hudson	8	7	0	0	21	13 January 1934	Australia
Fred Harris	2	0	0	0	0	13 January 1934	Australia
Alec Troup	4	0	0	0	0	13 January 1934	Australia
Paddy Dalton	5	0	0	0	0	13 January 1934	Australia
Norman Foster	1	0	0	0	0	28 March 1935	France
George Todd	3	1	0	0	3	28 March 1935	France
Tommy McCue	11	0	0	0	0	28 March 1935	France
Harry Woods	3	0	0	0	0	28 March 1935	France
Tommy Armitt	10	1	0	0	3	28 March 1935	France
Bert Cambridge	1	0	0	0	0	28 March 1935	France
Len Smith	1	2	0	0	6	28 March 1935	France
Billy Belshaw	11	0	17	0	34	10 April 1935	Wales
Harry Beverley	5	1	0	0	3	10 April 1935	Wales
Jack Kenny	1	0	0	0	0	1 February 1936	Wales
Ernie Herbert	2	0	0	0	0	16 February 1936	France
Stan Pepperell	3	0	2	0	4	7 November 1936	Wales
Billy Stott	1	0	0	0	0	7 November 1936	Wales
Jim Croston	6	0	0	0	0	7 November 1936	Wales
Ernie Thompson	1	0	0	0	0	7 November 1936	Wales
Alec Higgins	6	0	0	0	0	7 November 1936	Wales
Bernard Cunniffe	1	0	0	0	0	10 April 1937	France
Tom Winnard	1	2	1	0	8	10 April 1937	France
Jim Cumberbatch	2	3	0	0	9	10 April 1937	France
Tommy Shannon	2	1	0	0	3	29 January 1938	Wales
Hudson Irving	4	0	0	0	0	29 January 1938	Wales
Bob Ayres	3	0	0	0	0	29 January 1938	Wales
Charlie Booth	3	0	0	0	0	29 January 1938	Wales
Val Cumberbatch	1	1	0	0	3	20 March 1938	France
Cyril Morrell	3	0	0	0	0	20 March 1938	France
Leslie Grainge	1	0	0	0	0	20 March 1938	France
Laurie Thacker	4	1	0	0	3	20 March 1938	France
Harold Ellerington	2	0	0	0	0	20 March 1938	France
Eric Batten	14	7	0	0	21	5 November 1938	Wales
Alf Watson	1	0	0	0	0	5 November 1938	Wales
Frank Tracey	2	0	0	0	0	25 February 1939	France
Edgar Brooks	3	0	0	0	0	25 February 1939	France
Hugh McDowell	1	0	0	0	0	25 February 1939	France
Johnny Lawrenson	9	0	0	0	0	23 December 1939	Wales
Ossie Peake	3	0	0	0	0	23 December 1939	Wales
Tom Kenny	1	0	0	0	0	23 December 1939	Wales
Harry Goodfellow	1	0	0	0	0	23 December 1939	Wales
Francis Gregory	1	0	0	0	0	23 December 1939	Wales
Harry Dyer	1	0	0	0	0	23 December 1939	Wales
Robert Roberts	2	0	0	0	0	23 December 1939	Wales
Jack Waring	1	1	0	0	3	9 November 1940	Wales
Ted Tattersfield	4	0	0	0	0	9 November 1940	Wales
George Bunter	1	0	0	0	0	9 November 1940	Wales
John Moore	1	1	0	0	3	9 November 1940	Wales
Ernest Ward	19	2	26	0	58	18 October 1941	Wales
Thomas Johnson	1	0	0	0	0	18 October 1941	Wales
Jim Stott	3	0	0	0	0	27 February 1943	Wales
Gordon Aspinall	1	1	0	0	3	27 February 1943	Wales
Martin Ryan	12	2	0	0	0	27 February 1943	Wales
Billy Thornton	1	0	0	0	0	27 February 1943	Wales
Ken Gee	21	1	8	0	19	27 February 1943	Wales
Joe Egan	21	1	0	0	3	27 February 1943	Wales
Harry Wilkinson	4	0	0	0	0	27 February 1943	Wales
Bryn Knowelden	3	1	0	0	3	26 February 1944	Wales
Jimmy Robinson	1	0	0	0	0	26 February 1944	Wales
Albert Johnson	11	6	0	0	18	26 February 1944	Wales
Tommy Bradshaw	14	1	0	0	3	26 February 1944	Wales
William Hutchinson	2	0	0	0	0	26 February 1944	Wales
Harry Millington	1	0	0	0	0	26 February 1944	Wales
Willie Horne	14	3	13	0	35	10 March 1945	Wales
Colin Stansfield	1	0	0	0	0	10 March 1945	Wales
George Brown	1	0	0	0	0	10 March 1945	Wales
Jack Kitching	4	0	0	0	0	10 March 1945	Wales
Tommy Taylor	1	0	0	0	0	10 March 1945	Wales
Tommy Rostron	1	0	0	0	0	10 March 1945	Wales
Bob Nicholson	6	1	0	0	3	10 March 1945	Wales
Fred Higgins	4	0	0	0	0	10 March 1945	Wales
Len Bratley	1	0	0	0	0	10 March 1945	Wales
Les White	10	4	0	0	13	23 February 1946	France
Harry Murphy	2	0	0	0	0	23 February 1946	France
Ernest Ashcroft	11	2	0	0	6	12 October 1946	Wales
George Curran	12	0	0	0	0	12 October 1946	Wales
Alec Dockar	6	0	0	0	0	12 October 1946	Wales
Bill Hudson	4	0	0	0	0	12 October 1946	Wales
Jimmy Ledgard	12	2	24	0	54	17 May 1947	France
Russell Pepperell	4	1	0	0	3	17 May 1947	France
Gordon Ratcliffe	4	3	0	0	9	20 September 1947	Wales
Albert Bowers	2	0	0	0	0	20 September 1947	Wales
Ron Rylance	1	0	1	0	2	20 September 1947	Wales
Len Aston	3	2	0	0	6	20 September 1947	Wales
Eppie Gibson	4	2	0	0	6	25 October 1947	France
Billy Derbyshire	1	0	0	0	0	6 December 1947	Wales
Harold Palin	3	0	2	0	4	6 December 1947	Wales
Des Clarkson	2	1	0	0	3	6 December 1947	Wales
Jackie Fleming	6	1	0	0	3	1 April 1948	France
Albert Pimblett	2	2	0	0	6	22 September 1948	Wales
Stan McCormick	3	0	0	0	0	22 September 1948	Wales
Gerry Helme	4	1	0	0	3	22 September 1948	Wales
Jim Featherstone	8	0	0	0	0	28 November 1948	France
Billy Ivison	4	0	0	0	0	5 February 1949	Wales
Ted Kerwick	1	0	0	0	0	19 September 1949	Other Nationalities
Geoff Clark	2	1	0	0	3	19 September 1949	Other Nationalities
Danny Naughton	1	0	0	0	0	19 September 1949	Other Nationalities
Jimmy Hayton	1	0	0	0	0	19 September 1949	Other Nationalities
Charlie Armitt	1	0	0	0	0	19 September 1949	Other Nationalities
Roy Pollard	2	0	0	0	0	4 December 1949	France
Jack Hilton	3	4	0	0	12	4 December 1949	France
Jack Cunliffe	7	1	0	0	3	4 December 1949	France
Len Marson	1	0	0	0	0	4 December 1949	France
Ken Traill	3	1	0	0	3	4 December 1949	France
Tom Danby	3	0	0	0	0	1 March 1950	Wales
Jim Barraclough	1	0	0	0	0	1 March 1950	Wales
Harry Street	6	1	0	0	3	1 March 1950	Wales
Jack Broome	2	3	0	0	9	1 March 1950	Wales
Alan Prescott	11	0	0	0	0	1 March 1950	Wales
Ted Slevin	2	0	0	0	0	1 March 1950	Wales
Alf Burnell	4	4	0	0	12	11 November 1950	France
Bob Ryan	2	0	0	0	0	11 November 1950	France
Bernard Poole	1	0	0	0	0	11 November 1950	France
Ken Dean	2	0	2	0	4	11 April 1951	Other Nationalities
Arthur Wood	1	0	0	0	0	11 April 1951	Other Nationalities
Frank Barton	2	0	0	0	0	11 April 1951	Other Nationalities
George Palmer	1	0	0	0	0	11 April 1951	Other Nationalities
Nat Silcock, Jr.	3	3	0	0	9	11 April 1951	Other Nationalities
Geoff Tulloch	1	1	0	0	3	19 September 1951	Wales
Vince McKeating	2	0	0	0	0	19 September 1951	Wales
Mick Scott	3	0	0	0	0	19 September 1951	Wales
Charlie Pawsey	8	0	0	0	0	19 September 1951	Wales
Billy Blan	3	0	0	0	0	19 September 1951	Wales
Dick Cracknell	5	3	0	0	9	25 November 1951	France
Doug Greenall	6	5	0	0	15	25 November 1951	France
Frank Castle	5	6	0	0	18	25 November 1951	France
Don Robinson	3	1	0	0	3	25 November 1951	France
Ted Toohey	2	0	0	0	0	18 October 1952	Other Nationalities
Alvin Ackerley	6	0	0	0	0	18 October 1952	Other Nationalities
Terry O'Grady	2	1	0	0	3	17 November 1952	Wales
Derrick Schofield	2	0	0	0	0	17 November 1952	Wales
Jimmy Lewthwaite	1					18 October 1952	Other Nationalities
Ron Ryder	1	0	0	0	0	18 October 1952	Other Nationalities
Albert Blan	1	0	0	0	0	11 April 1953	France
Albert Naughton	3	0	0	0	0	11 April 1953	France
Johnny Whiteley	1	0	0	0	0	11 April 1953	France
Alan Davies	2	3	0	0	9	16 September 1953	Wales
Stan Kielty	3	1	0	0	3	16 September 1953	Wales
John Henderson	1	0	0	0	0	16 September 1953	Wales
Ted Cahill	2	1	0	0	3	7 November 1953	France
Don Froggett	1	0	0	0	0	7 November 1953	France
Peter Metcalfe	1	0	0	0	0	7 November 1953	France
Jim Bowden	1	0	0	0	0	7 November 1953	France
Harry Markham	1	0	0	0	0	7 November 1953	France
Peter Norburn	1	4	0	0	12	28 November 1953	Other Nationalities
Harry Bradshaw	1	0	0	0	0	28 November 1953	Other Nationalities
Jack Wilkinson	2	0	0	0	0	28 November 1953	Other Nationalities
Basil Watts	1	0	0	0	0	28 November 1953	Other Nationalities
Mick Sullivan	3	2	0	0	6	12 September 1955	Other Nationalities
Phil Jackson	1	0	0	0	0	12 September 1955	Other Nationalities
Dennis Goodwin	1	0	0	0	0	12 September 1955	Other Nationalities
Joe Mullaney	1	1	0	0	3	12 September 1955	Other Nationalities
Frank Pitchford	1	0	0	0	0	12 September 1955	Other Nationalities
Sam Smith	2	0	0	0	0	12 September 1955	Other Nationalities
Reg Parker	1	0	0	0	0	12 September 1955	Other Nationalities
Frank Carlton	1	0	0	0	0	10 May 1956	France
John Dickinson	1	0	0	0	0	10 May 1956	France
Don Fox	1	0	0	0	0	10 May 1956	France
Norman Cherrington	1	0	0	0	0	10 May 1956	France
Brian Briggs	1	0	0	0	0	10 May 1956	France
Colin Clifft	1	1	0	0	3	10 May 1956	France
Ken Gowers	1	0	0	0	0	17 November 1962	France
Bill Burgess	3	3	0	0	9	17 November 1962	France
Eric Ashton	1	1	0	0	3	17 November 1962	France
Neil Fox	1	1	3	0	9	17 November 1962	France
Frank Myler	1	0	0	0	0	17 November 1962	France
Tommy Smales	2	0	0	0	0	17 November 1962	France
Norman Herbert	1	0	0	0	0	17 November 1962	France
Peter Flanagan	5	0	0	0	0	17 November 1962	France
Bill Drake	1	0	0	0	0	17 November 1962	France
Brian Edgar	1	0	0	0	0	17 November 1962	France
Dick Huddart	1	0	0	0	0	17 November 1962	France
Derek Turner	1	0	0	0	0	17 November 1962	France
Brian Jefferson	1	0	0	0	0	7 November 1968	Wales
Alan Smith	3	4	0	0	12	7 November 1968	Wales
Billy Benyon	2	0	0	0	0	7 November 1968	Wales
Chris Hesketh	3	0	0	0	0	7 November 1968	Wales
John Atkinson	12	7	0	0	21	7 November 1968	Wales
Billy Davies	1	0	0	0	0	7 November 1968	Wales
Mick Shoebottom	4	1	0	0	3	7 November 1968	Wales
Dennis Hartley	1	0	0	0	0	7 November 1968	Wales
Kevin Taylor	1	0	0	0	0	7 November 1968	Wales
Cliff Watson	4	2	0	0	6	7 November 1968	Wales
Arnie Morgan	1	0	0	0	0	7 November 1968	Wales
Ken Parr	1	0	0	0	0	7 November 1968	Wales
Ray Batten	3	2	0	0	6	7 November 1968	Wales
Alan Buckley	1	0	0	0	0	7 November 1968	Wales
Arthur Keegan	2	0	0	0	0	18 October 1969	Wales
Syd Hynes	4	5	0	0	15	18 October 1969	Wales
Roger Millward	17	3	9	1	28	18 October 1969	Wales
Alex Murphy	2	1	1	0	5	18 October 1969	Wales
John Stephens	3	0	0	0	0	18 October 1969	Wales
Johnny Ward	3	0	0	0	0	18 October 1969	Wales
Dave Robinson	1	0	0	0	0	18 October 1969	Wales
Bob Haigh	2	1	0	0	3	18 October 1969	Wales
Ray Dutton	3	0	7	0	14	24 February 1970	Wales
Barry Seabourne	2	0	0	0	0	24 February 1970	Wales
Malcolm Dixon	1	0	0	0	0	24 February 1970	Wales
Phil Lowe	5	2	0	0	6	24 February 1970	Wales
Malcolm Reilly	3	0	0	0	0	24 February 1970	Wales
Jimmy Thompson	6	0	0	0	0	15 March 1970	France
Brian Lockwood	3	0	0	0	0	15 March 1970	France
Martin Murphy	1	0	0	0	0	19 January 1975	France
Keith Fielding	6	7	0	0	21	16 March 1975	France
John Walsh	4	0	0	0	0	16 March 1975	France
Les Dyl	13	2	0	0	6	16 March 1975	France
David Redfearn	2	1	0	0	3	16 March 1975	France
David Topliss	1	0	0	0	0	16 March 1975	France
Mike Coulman	5	0	0	0	0	10 June 1975	Wales
John Gray	3	0	4	0	8	16 March 1975	France
John Millington	2	0	0	0	0	19 January 1975	France
John Cunningham	2	0	0	0	0	19 January 1975	France
Eric Chisnall	3	0	0	0	0	10 June 1975	Wales
George Nicholls	7	0	0	0	0	16 March 1975	France
David Eckersley	5	0	0	0	0	20 September 1975	Wales
Mick Morgan	7	1	0	0	3	19 January 1975	France
Les Sheard	1	0	0	0	0	25 February 1975	Wales
Ged Dunn	8	4	0	0	12	25 February 1975	Wales
Derek Noonan	4	1	0	0	3	25 February 1975	Wales
Ken Gill	12	5	0	0	15	25 February 1975	Wales
Phil Jackson	2	1	0	0	3	25 February 1975	Wales
Tommy Martyn	5	2	0	0	6	25 February 1975	Wales
David Chisnall	4	0	0	0	0	25 February 1975	Wales
Paul Charlton	1	0	0	0	0	16 March 1975	France
Barry Philbin	1	0	0	0	0	16 March 1975	France
George Fairbairn	16	5	51	1	118	6 July 1975	Papua New Guinea
Steve Nash	7	1	0	0	3	10 June 1975	Wales
Steve Norton	11	2	0	0	6	10 June 1975	Wales
John Keith Bridges	9	0	0	1	2	21 June 1975	New Zealand
Phil Cookson	3	0	0	0	0	21 June 1975	New Zealand
Eric Hughes	10	8	0	0	24	20 September 1975	Wales
John Holmes	7	5	0	0	15	20 September 1975	Wales
Brian Hogan	5	1	0	0	3	20 September 1975	Wales
Colin Forsyth	3	1	0	0	3	20 September 1975	Wales
Bob Irving	3	0	0	0	0	20 September 1975	Wales
Jeff Grayshon	1	2	0	0	6	20 September 1975	Wales
Stuart Wright	7	5	0	0	15	25 October 1975	New Zealand
Mick Adams	6	0	0	0	0	25 October 1975	New Zealand
David Smith	2	1	0	0	3	12 November 1975	Australia
Nigel Stephenson	1	0	0	0	0	12 November 1975	Australia
Harry Beverley	2	0	0	0	0	12 November 1975	Australia
Stan Fearnley	1	0	0	0	0	12 November 1975	Australia
Charlie Stone	1	0	0	0	0	12 November 1975	Australia
Les Jones	1	0	0	0	0	29 January 1977	Wales
Les Gorley	2	0	0	0	0	29 January 1977	Wales
Doug Laughton	1	0	0	0	0	29 January 1977	Wales
David Ward	6	0	0	0	0	20 March 1977	France
Vince Farrar	1	0	0	0	0	20 March 1977	France
Paul Rose	2	0	0	0	0	20 March 1977	France
Mick Harrison	2	0	0	0	0	5 March 1978	France
Keith Elwell	2	0	0	0	0	5 March 1978	France
Len Casey	5	1	0	0	3	5 March 1978	France
Geoff Pimblett	1	1	9	0	21	28 May 1978	Wales
Keith Mumby	2	1	1	0	5	16 March 1979	Wales
Peter Glynn	2	0	0	0	0	16 March 1979	Wales
Keith Smith	1	1	0	0	3	16 March 1979	Wales
Ken Kelly	3	1	0	0	3	16 March 1979	Wales
Gary Stephens	1	0	0	0	0	16 March 1979	Wales
Graham Liptrot	2	0	0	0	0	16 March 1979	Wales
John Woods	7	2	8	0	22	16 March 1979	Wales
David Watkinson	1	0	0	0	0	16 March 1979	Wales
Steve Evans	3	1	0	0	3	24 March 1979	France
Alan Redfearn	2	0	0	1	1	24 March 1979	France
Keith Tindall	1	0	0	0	0	24 March 1979	France
Phil Hogan	1	0	0	0	0	24 March 1979	France
Barry Banks	1	0	0	0	0	24 March 1979	France
Eddie Szymala	1	0	0	0	0	24 March 1979	France
John Joyner	4	2	0	0	6	29 February 1980	Wales
Mike Smith	5	0	0	0	0	29 February 1980	Wales
Des Drummond	5	1	0	0	3	29 February 1980	Wales
Neil Holding	1	0	0	0	0	29 February 1980	Wales
Roy Holdstock	3	1	0	0	3	29 February 1980	Wales
Keith Rayne	2	1	0	0	3	29 February 1980	Wales
Peter Gorley	3	1	0	0	3	29 February 1980	Wales
Harry Pinner	3	0	0	2	2	29 February 1980	Wales
Peter Smith	1	0	0	0	0	16 March 1980	France
Steve Fenton	2	0	0	0	0	21 February 1981	France
Arnold Walker	1	0	0	0	0	21 February 1981	France
Steve O'Neill	1	0	0	0	0	21 February 1981	France
Brian Case	1	0	0	0	0	21 February 1981	France
Ian Potter	2	0	0	0	0	21 February 1981	France
Bill Pattinson	2	0	0	0	0	21 February 1981	France
Terry Richardson	1	0	0	0	0	18 March 1981	Wales
Henderson Gill	1	1	0	0	3	8 November 1981	Wales
Mick Burke	1	1	4	0	12	14 October 1984	Wales
Garry Schofield	3	1	0	0	4	14 October 1984	Wales
Ellery Hanley	2	2	0	0	8	14 October 1984	Wales
Garry Clark	1	3	0	0	12	14 October 1984	Wales
Steve Donlan	1	0	0	0	0	14 October 1984	Wales
David Cairns	1	0	0	0	0	14 October 1984	Wales
David Hobbs	1	0	0	0	0	14 October 1984	Wales
Kevin Beardmore	1	0	0	0	0	14 October 1984	Wales
Hugh Waddell	1	0	0	0	0	14 October 1984	Wales
Andy Kelly	1	0	0	0	0	14 October 1984	Wales
Andy Goodway	1	0	0	0	0	14 October 1984	Wales
Milton Huddart	1	0	0	0	0	14 October 1984	Wales
Barry Ledger	1	0	0	0	0	14 October 1984	Wales
Chris Arkwright	1	0	0	0	0	14 October 1984	Wales
Stuart Spruce	3	1	0	0	4	27 November 1992	Wales
Alan Hunte	1	0	0	0	0	27 November 1992	Wales
Gary Connolly	3	3	0	0	12	27 November 1992	Wales
Paul Newlove	7	7	0	0	28	27 November 1992	Wales
Martin Offiah	5	8	0	2	34	27 November 1992	Wales
Mike Ford	1	0	0	0	0	27 November 1992	Wales
Lee Crooks	1	1	4	0	12	27 November 1992	Wales
Lee Jackson	6	0	0	0	0	27 November 1992	Wales
Steve Molloy	10	0	0	0	0	27 November 1992	Wales
Richard Eyres	1	0	0	0	0	27 November 1992	Wales
Phil Clarke	6	1	0	0	4	27 November 1992	Wales
Daryl Powell	4	0	0	0	0	27 November 1992	Wales
Chris Joynt	6	2	0	0	8	27 November 1992	Wales
Jason Critchley	1	0	0	0	0	27 November 1992	Wales
Dean Busby	1	0	0	0	0	27 November 1992	Wales
Richard Gay	2	1	0	0	4	1 February 1995	Wales
Jason Robinson	7	4	0	0	16	1 February 1995	Wales
Ikram Butt	1	0	0	0	0	1 February 1995	Wales
Deryck Fox	2	1	5	0	14	1 February 1995	Wales
Karl Harrison	6	0	0	0	0	1 February 1995	Wales
Richard Russell	1	0	0	0	0	1 February 1995	Wales
Harvey Howard	6	0	0	0	0	1 February 1995	Wales
Anthony Farrell						1 February 1995	Wales
Sonny Nickle	1	0	0	0	0	1 February 1995	Wales
Simon Baldwin	2	0	0	0	0	1 February 1995	Wales
Mick Cassidy	6					1 February 1995	Wales
Steve McNamara	5	0	12	0	24	1 February 1995	Wales
Steve McCurrie	3	0	0	0	0	1 February 1995	Wales
John Bentley	5	1	0	0	4	15 February 1995	France
Nick Pinkney	4	3	0	0	12	15 February 1995	France
Richard Goddard	1	0	0	0	0	15 February 1995	France
Francis Cummins	2	0	0	0	0	15 February 1995	France
Nigel Wright	1	0	0	1	1	15 February 1995	France
Paul Broadbent	5	2	0	0	8	15 February 1995	France
Stephen Holgate	1	0	0	0	0	15 February 1995	France
Tony Smith	9	5	0	0	20	15 February 1995	France
Roger Simpson	1	0	0	0	0	15 February 1995	France
Mark Hilton	3	0	0	0	0	15 February 1995	France
Kris Radlinski	10	3	0	0	12	7 October 1995	Australia
Barrie-Jon Mather	2	0	0	0	0	7 October 1995	Australia
Shaun Edwards	3	1	0	0	4	7 October 1995	Australia
Andy Platt	4	0	0	0	0	7 October 1995	Australia
Denis Betts	4	1	0	0	4	7 October 1995	Australia
Andy Farrell	11	4	33	0	82	7 October 1995	Australia
Simon Haughton	5	2	0	0	8	7 October 1995	Australia
Bobbie Goulding	5	2	18	1	45	11 October 1995	Fiji
Dean Sampson	5	3	0	0	12	11 October 1995	Fiji
Paul Cook	2	0	0	0	0	11 October 1995	Fiji
Steve Prescott	2	3	7	0	26	12 June 1996	France
Steve Blakeley	3	1	0	0	4	12 June 1996	France
Johnny Lawless	2	0	0	0	0	12 June 1996	France
Paul Sculthorpe	4	4	0	0	16	12 June 1996	France
Matt Calland	1	0	0	0	0	12 June 1996	France
Paul Rowley	4	2	0	0	8	12 June 1996	France
Adrian Morley	23	1	0	0	4	12 June 1996	France
Nathan McAvoy	4	0	0	0	0	26 June 1996	Wales
Barrie McDermott	1	0	0	0	0	26 June 1996	Wales
Marcus St Hilaire	2	4	0	0	16	13 October 1999	France
Paul Sterling	1	1	0	0	4	13 October 1999	France
Francis Maloney	2	2	0	0	8	13 October 1999	France
Jon Roper	1	0	0	0	0	13 October 1999	France
Darren Rogers	5	2	0	0	8	13 October 1999	France
Danny Orr	3	2	0	0	8	19 June 1998	Wales
Paul Deacon	4	1	0	0	4	1 November 2000	Russia
Terry Newton	3	0	0	0	0	13 October 1999	France
Lee Harland	2	0	0	0	0	13 October 1999	France
Leon Pryce	7	3	0	0	12	23 October 1999	France
Nathan Sykes	10	0	0	0	0	23 October 1999	France
Scott Naylor	4	1	0	0	4	28 October 2000	Australia
Keith Senior	10	2	0	0	8	19 June 1998	Wales
Chev Walker	6	2	0	0	8	28 October 2000	Australia
Sean Long	6	2	5	0	18	19 June 1998	Wales
Stuart Fielden	10	0	0	0	0	28 October 2000	Australia
Mike Forshaw	3	0	0	0	0	28 October 2000	Australia
Paul Wellens	11	4	0	0	16	28 October 2000	Australia
Kevin Sinfield	26	5	91	0	202	28 October 2000	Australia
Darren Fleary	2	0	0	0	0	28 October 2000	Australia
Paul Anderson	5	0	0	0	0	28 October 2000	Australia
Francis Stephenson	3	1	0	0	4	1 November 2000	Russia
Jamie Peacock	21	8	0	0	32	1 November 2000	Russia
Andy Hay	3	2	0	0	8	1 November 2000	Russia
Brian McDermott	1	0	0	0	0	29 July 2001	Wales
Karl Pratt	1	1	0	0	4	29 July 2001	Wales
Paul King	1	0	0	0	0	29 July 2001	Wales
Lee Radford	5	1	0	0	4	29 July 2001	Wales
Shaun Briscoe	11	4	0	0	16	2 November 2003	Russia
Lee Greenwood	2	2	0	0	8	24 October 2004	Russia
Ben Westwood	26	3	5	0	22	24 October 2004	Russia
Kirk Yeaman	8	3	0	0	12	24 October 2004	Russia
Gareth Raynor	2	4	0	0	16	24 October 2004	Russia
Richard Whiting	3	1	0	0	4	24 October 2004	Russia
Luke Robinson	6	3	0	0	12	24 October 2004	Russia
Andy Lynch	5	0	0	0	0	24 October 2004	Russia
Wayne Godwin	3	1	20	0	44	24 October 2004	Russia
Ewan Dowes	7	0	0	0	0	24 October 2004	Russia
Rob Parker	3	1	0	0	4	24 October 2004	Russia
Andy Coley	1	1	0	0	4	24 October 2004	Russia
Jamie Langley	5	0	0	0	0	24 October 2004	Russia
Rob Burrow	15	12	12	0	72	24 October 2004	Russia
Eorl Crabtree	14	3	0	0	12	24 October 2004	Russia
Stuart Jones	1	1	0	0	4	24 October 2004	Russia
Nick Scruton	7	1	0	0	4	24 October 2004	Russia
Mark Calderwood	9	9	0	0	36	30 October 2004	France
Jon Wilkin	10	1	0	0	4	30 October 2004	France
Paul Reilly	3	2	0	0	8	30 October 2004	France
Richard Mathers	2	0	1	0	2	23 October 2005	France
Paul Sykes	5	2	6	0	20	10 October 2008	Wales
Stuart Reardon	2	0	0	0	0	23 October 2005	France
Ade Gardner	5	2	0	0	8	25 October 2008	Papua New Guinea
Chris Thorman	2	0	0	0	0	23 October 2005	France
Malcolm Alker	2	0	0	0	0	23 October 2005	France
Paul Wood	2	0	0	0	0	23 October 2005	France
Jamie Jones-Buchanan	14	3	0	0	12	23 October 2005	France
Chris Charles	1	0	0	0	0	23 October 2005	France
Mike Bennett	1	0	0	0	0	23 October 2005	France
Mark Gleeson	1	0	0	0	0	23 October 2005	France
Darrell Griffin	2	0	0	0	0	10 October 2008	Wales
David Hodgson	5	3	0	0	12	10 October 2008	Wales
Stephen Wild	1	0	0	0	0	6 November 2005	New Zealand
Lee Smith	8	7	1	0	30	22 October 2006	France
Ashley Gibson	4	2	0	0	8	22 October 2006	France
Danny Williams	2	0	0	0	0	22 October 2006	France
Rob Purdham	7	3	15	0	42	22 October 2006	France
Jamie Rooney	4	4	18	0	52	22 October 2006	France
Matt Diskin	3	0	0	0	0	22 October 2006	France
Brett Ferres	14	9	0	0	32	22 October 2006	France
Chris Ashton	4	3	0	0	12	22 October 2006	France
Matt Cook	2	0	0	0	0	22 October 2006	France
Ryan Bailey	4	0	0	0	0	22 October 2006	France
Paul Cooke	3	0	0	0	0	22 October 2006	France
Ryan Atkins	5	4	0	0	16	5 November 2006	Samoa
Graeme Horne	2	0	0	0	0	5 November 2006	Samoa
Martin Gleeson	6	8	0	0	32	27 June 2008	France
Peter Fox	6	7	0	0	28	27 June 2008	France
James Roby	31	5	0	0	20	27 June 2008	France
Gareth Ellis	16	2	0	0	8	27 June 2008	France
Sam Burgess	24	8	0	0	32	27 June 2008	France
James Graham	44	3	0	0	12	27 June 2008	France
Maurie Fa'asavalu	3	1	0	0	4	27 June 2008	France
Danny McGuire	7	4	0	0	16	25 October 2008	Papua New Guinea
Michael Shenton	10	3	0	0	12	10 October 2008	Wales
Richie Myler	7	8	9	0	50	10 October 2008	Wales
Mick Higham	4	1	0	0	4	8 November 2008	New Zealand
Louis McCarthy-Scarsbrook	2	2	0	0	8	10 October 2008	Wales
Gareth Hock	5	0	0	0	0	10 October 2008	Wales
Tony Clubb	4	6	0	0	24	10 October 2008	Wales
Ryan Hall	40	39	0	0	156	13 June 2009	France
Scott Moore	2	0	0	0	0	13 June 2009	France
Tom Briscoe	15	11	0	0	44	17 October 2009	Wales
Sean O'Loughlin	25	5	0	0	20	17 October 2009	Wales
Sam Tomkins	29	18	1	0	74	17 October 2009	Wales
Garreth Carvell	9	0	0	0	0	17 October 2009	Wales
Danny Tickle	1	1	0	0	4	17 October 2009	Wales
Chris Bridge	4	1	0	0	4	17 October 2009	Wales
Kyle Eastmond	4	1	0	0	4	23 October 2009	France
Kevin Brown	10	1	0	0	4	12 June 2010	France
Joel Tomkins	6	1	0	0	4	12 June 2010	France
Gareth Widdop	28	7	71	1	171	12 June 2010	France
Darrell Goulding	2	0	0	0	0	23 October 2010	New Zealand
Leroy Cudjoe	10	2	1	0	10	31 October 2010	Australia
Ben Harrison	3	1	0	0	4	31 October 2010	Australia
Shaun Lunt	1	0	0	0	0	31 October 2010	Australia
Rangi Chase	10	1	0	0	4	21 October 2011	France
Chris Heighington	8	2	0	0	8	21 October 2011	France
Jack Reed	5	3	0	0	12	21 October 2011	France
Carl Ablett	5	0	0	0	0	27 October 2012	Wales
Josh Charnley	8	9	0	0	36	27 October 2012	Wales
Zak Hardaker	7	2	0	0	8	27 October 2012	Wales
Chris Hill	37	0	0	0	0	27 October 2012	Wales
Michael McIlorum	9	0	0	0	0	27 October 2012	Wales
Lee Mossop	4	0	0	0	0	27 October 2012	Wales
Kallum Watkins	31	15	0	0	60	27 October 2012	Wales
George Burgess	15	2	0	0	8	26 October 2013	Australia
Tom Burgess	34	7	0	0	28	26 October 2013	Australia
Liam Farrell	12	4	0	0	16	19 October 2013	Italy
Daryl Clark	14	2	0	0	8	25 October 2014	Samoa
Josh Hodgson	19	3	0	0	12	25 October 2014	Samoa
Matty Smith	4	0	0	0	0	25 October 2014	Samoa
Joe Westerman	1	0	0	0	0	25 October 2014	Samoa
Dan Sarginson	3	0	0	0	0	2 November 2014	Australia
Elliott Whitehead	27	12	0	0	48	8 November 2014	New Zealand
John Bateman	27	8	0	0	32	24 October 2015	France
Joe Burgess	4	1	0	0	4	24 October 2015	France
Mike Cooper	13	0	0	0	0	24 October 2015	France
George Williams	23	11	1	0	46	24 October 2015	France
Jermaine McGillvary	17	12	0	0	48	14 November 2015	New Zealand
Luke Gale	10	1	5	0	14	22 October 2016	France
Jonny Lomax	11	0	0	0	0	22 October 2016	France
Mark Percival	6	2	1	0	10	22 October 2016	France
Stefan Ratchford	6	2	0	0	8	22 October 2016	France
Scott Taylor	4	0	0	0	0	22 October 2016	France
Mike McMeeken	14	1	0	0	4	6 May 2017	Samoa
Chris McQueen	1	0	0	0	0	6 May 2017	Samoa
Ben Currie	10	3	0	0	12	27 October 2017	Australia
Alex Walmsley	9	1	0	0	4	4 November 2017	Lebanon
Jake Connor	5	4	9	0	34	23 June 2018	New Zealand
Tommy Makinson	10	13	20	0	92	23 June 2018	New Zealand
Oliver Holmes	1	0	0	0	0	17 October 2018	France
Tom Johnstone	8	7	0	0	28	17 October 2018	France
Reece Lyne	2	0	0	0	0	17 October 2018	France
Adam Milner	3	0	0	0	0	17 October 2018	France
Robbie Mulhern	2	0	0	0	0	17 October 2018	France
Jamie Shaul	1	0	0	0	0	17 October 2018	France
Liam Sutcliffe	1	0	0	0	0	17 October 2018	France
Luke Thompson	9	2	0	0	8	17 October 2018	France
Oliver Gildart	3	1	0	0	4	27 October 2018	New Zealand
Joe Greenwood	1	0	0	0	0	11 November 2018	New Zealand
Jordan Abdull	1	0	3	0	6	23 October 2021	France
Tom Davies	1	1	0	0	4	23 October 2021	France
Niall Evalds	1	0	0	0	0	23 October 2021	France
Morgan Knowles	11	0	0	0	0	23 October 2021	France
Kruise Leeming	1	0	0	0	0	23 October 2021	France
Paul McShane	1	0	0	0	0	23 October 2021	France
Mikolaj Oledzki	4	0	0	0	0	23 October 2021	France
Joe Philbin	1	0	0	0	0	23 October 2021	France
Herbie Farnworth	9	6	0	0	24	15 October 2022	Samoa
Matty Lees	12	1	0	0	4	15 October 2022	Samoa
Victor Radley	9	2	0	0	8	15 October 2022	Samoa
Jack Welsby	13	4	0	0	16	15 October 2022	Samoa
Dom Young	8	9	0	0	36	15 October 2022	Samoa
Andy Ackers	2	2	0	0	8	22 October 2022	France
Marc Sneyd	2	1	20	0	44	22 October 2022	France
Joe Batchelor	1	1	0	0	4	29 October 2022	Greece
Kai Pearce-Paul	3	2	0	0	8	29 October 2022	Greece
Matty Ashton	5	6	0	0	24	29 April 2023	France
Tyler Dupree	3	0	0	0	0	29 April 2023	France
Ash Handley	2	5	0	0	20	29 April 2023	France
James Harrison	2	0	0	0	0	29 April 2023	France
Ethan Havard	3	1	0	0	4	29 April 2023	France
Tom Holroyd	1	0	0	0	0	29 April 2023	France
Toby King	3	1	0	0	4	29 April 2023	France
Jez Litten	4	0	0	0	0	29 April 2023	France
Matty Nicholson	2	1	0	0	4	29 April 2023	France
Harry Smith	9	1	38	0	80	29 April 2023	France
Morgan Smithies	3	0	0	0	0	29 April 2023	France
Danny Walker	4	1	0	0	4	29 April 2023	France
Jake Wardle	3	1	0	0	4	29 April 2023	France
Mikey Lewis	8	2	1	0	10	22 October 2023	Tonga
Harry Newman	7	1	0	0	4	22 October 2023	Tonga
Elliot Minchella	1	0	0	0	0	29 June 2024	France
Brad O'Neill	1	0	0	0	0	29 June 2024	France
Oliver Wilson	1	0	0	0	0	29 June 2024	France
Sam Wood	1	0	0	0	0	29 June 2024	France
Liam Marshall	1	1	0	0	4	2 November 2024	Samoa
Junior Nsemba	1	0	0	0	0	2 November 2024	Samoa
Owen Trout	1	0	0	0	0	25 October 2025	Australia
AJ Brimson	2	0	0	0	0	1 November 2025	Australia

== See also ==
- List of Great Britain national rugby league team players
