= List of Broughton Rangers players =

The following is a list of rugby league players that made international or county appearances while playing for Broughton Rangers.

== International ==
=== England ===
- Jack Beetham (1908)
- Billy Bentham (1922–26)
- George Bunter (1940)
- Bert Cambridge (1935)
- Jim Clampitt (1909–14)
- James Cumberbatch (1937)
- Jack Flynn (1908)
- Jack Garvey (1936)
- Andy Hogg (1908)
- Stan McCormick (1948)
- Bob Poole (1905)
- Jack Price (1921)
- Billy Stott (1936)
- Ernie Thompson (1936)
- Bob Wilson (1905)

=== Great Britain ===
- Billy Bentham (1924)
- Jim Clampitt (1908–14)
- Elwyn Gwyther (1947–51)
- Andy Hogg (1908)
- Stan McCormick (1948–49)
- Doug Phillips (1950)
- Jack Price (1921)
- Ray Price (1952)
- George Ruddick (1908–10)

=== Other nationalities ===
- Andy Hogg (1906)
- Sam James (1905–06)
- Willie James (1906)
- Jim Scott (1905)

=== Wales ===
- Elwyn Gwyther (1947–51)
- Glyn Jones (1946)
- Ned Jones (1913)
- Doug Phillips (1947–51)
- Ray Price (1948–52)
- George Ruddick (1908–11)
- Melbourne Tierney (1953)
- Frank Whitcombe (1938)

== County ==
=== Cumberland ===
- Jack Beetham (1902–03)
- John Benn (1904–05)
- Hilderick Bouch (1910–11)
- Bob Clampitt (1909–19)
- Jim Clampitt (1906–19)
- George Davidson (1910–20)
- Billy Doran (1929)
- Jack Flynn (1907–10)
- Joe Hall (1909)
- Ned Hodgson (1938–45)
- E. G. Morrison (1923–24)
- J. H. Templeton (1904)
- Jim Trotter (1907)
- Billy Winskill (1905–19)

=== Durham and Northumberland ===
- J. H. Jewitt (1903)

=== Glamorgan ===
- Dai Davies (1927)

=== Lancashire ===
- Eric Ayles (1952–53)
- Jim Barnes (1922)
- Jack Beetham (1906–12)
- Billy Bentham (1920–24)
- George Berry (1896)
- Harry Chapman (1895–98)
- Tom Cleminson (1895–97)
- Jim Cumberbatch (1935–36)
- Dick Duck (1898)
- Jack Fearnley (1946)
- Jack Garvey (1936)
- Billy Harris (1912)
- Frank Harry (1904–06)
- Andy Hogg (1902–08)
- Bill Hunt (1951)
- Alex Hurst (1921)
- Sam James (1902–06)
- Willie James (1901–06)
- W. J. Larkin (1920)
- Stan McCormick (1947–48)
- Billy McGarrigan (1932)
- George Messenger (1896–98)
- Joe Nelson (1897–98)
- Bill Oram (1902–03)
- Bob Poole (1904–06)
- Jack Price (1919–22)
- W. Robinson (1896)
- George Ruddick (1901–08)
- G. Steel (1897–98)
- Charlie Thompson (1899–1900)
- Jim Trotter (1904–05)
- George Whitehead (1897–1902)
- Alf Wild (1911)
- Bob Wilson (1901–07)

=== Yorkshire ===
- Billy Stott (1933–38)
- Ernie Thompson (1937)

== Rugby union representatives ==
=== England ===
- Arthur Royle (1889)
- Robert Seddon (1887)
- Alfred Teggin (1884–87)

=== Lancashire ===
- Jack Hacking (1895)
- Johnny Robertson (1882–88)
- Arthur Royle (1888–89)
- Robert Seddon (1884–87)
- Sam Simpson (1886)
- Alfred Teggin (1883–87)
- Jack Tune (1886–89)
- R. R. Veale (1888)

=== North of England ===
- Arthur Royle (1888–89)
- Robert Seddon (1885–86)
- Alfred Teggin (1883–86)
