= 1996 Castleford Tigers season =

- Super League I Rank: 9th
- Challenge Cup: Fourth round
- 1997 record: Wins: 9; draws: 0; losses: 14
- Points scored: For: 564; against: 657

Team information
- Head coach: John Joyner
- Stadium: Wheldon Road
List of seasons	1997 →

The 1996 Castleford Tigers season was the club's 1st year in the Super League. The club finished in 9th place. Castleford also competed in the Challenge Cup, but were knocked out in the Fourth Round by St. Helens.

== Table ==
Super League I
Pos	Team	Pld	W	D	L	PF	PA	PD	Pts	Qualification or relegation
1	St Helens (C)	22	20	0	2	950	455	+495	40	Qualified for Premiership semi final
2	Wigan	22	19	1	2	902	326	+576	39	Qualified for Premiership semi final
3	Bradford Bulls	22	17	0	5	767	409	+358	34	Qualified for Premiership semi final
4	London Broncos	22	12	1	9	611	462	+149	25	Qualified for Premiership semi final
5	Warrington Wolves	22	12	0	10	569	565	+4	24	
6	Halifax Blue Sox	22	10	1	11	667	576	+91	21	
7	Sheffield Eagles	22	10	0	12	599	730	−131	20	
8	Oldham Bears	22	9	1	12	473	681	−208	19	
9	Castleford Tigers	22	9	0	13	548	599	−51	18	
10	Leeds	22	6	0	16	555	745	−190	12	
11	Paris Saint-Germain	22	3	1	18	398	795	−397	7	
12	Workington Town (R)	22	2	1	19	325	1021	−696	5	Relegated to Division One

Source: Rugby League Project
Rules for classification: 1) Points; 2) Points difference; 3) Number of points scored;
(C) Champions; (R) Relegated

== Squad ==
Statistics include appearances and points in the Super League and Challenge Cup.

Player	Apps	Tries	Goals	DGs	Points	Ref
Chris Allen	1	0	0	0	0	
Grant Anderson	11	2	0	0	8	
Lee Bardawskas	1	0	0	0	0	
Frano Botica	21	5	84	2	190	
David Chapman	14	5	0	0	20	
James Coventry	2	0	0	0	0	
Lee Crooks	20	2	1	0	10	
Diccon Edwards	12	1	0	0	4	
Jason Flowers	22	10	0	0	40	
Stuart Flowers	3	0	0	0	0	
Adrian Flynn	19	9	0	0	36	
David Furness	1	0	0	0	0	
Richard Gay	10	2	0	0	8	
Eddie Glaze	1	0	0	0	0	
Richard Goddard	12	3	9	0	30	
Spencer Hargrave	3	0	0	0	0	
Lee Harland	16	2	0	0	8	
Colin Maskill	9	1	1	0	6	
Simon Middleton	11	5	0	0	20	
Tawera Nikau	1	0	0	0	0	
Junior Paramore	11	3	0	0	12	
Shaun Richardson	7	1	0	0	4	
Paul Round	3	0	0	0	0	
Richard Russell	12	1	0	0	4	
Dean Sampson	18	2	0	0	8	
Andrew Schick	22	6	0	0	24	
Ian Smales	15	5	0	0	20	
Chris Smith	21	10	0	0	40	
Tony Smith	19	10	0	0	40	
Graham Steadman	12	3	0	0	12	
Gareth Stephens	1	0	0	0	0	
Nathan Sykes	23	1	0	0	4	
Ian Tonks	3	1	0	0	4	
Brendon Tuuta	22	3	0	0	12	
Jon Wells	3	0	0	0	0	

== Transfers ==
=== In ===
Player	From	Fee	Date	Ref
Grant Anderson	Halifax Blue Sox		February 1996	
Richard Gay	Hull F.C.		March 1996	
Paul Round	Bradford Bulls		March 1996	
Diccon Edwards	Newport RFC		April 1996	
David Chapman	Hunter Mariners		May 1996	
Junior Paramore	Hunter Mariners		May 1996	
Jason Roach	Swinton Lions		October 1996	

=== Out ===
Player	Pos	Fee	Date	Ref
Gareth Stephens	Hull F.C.		April 1996	
Stuart Flowers	Hunslet Hawks		May 1996	
Colin Maskill	Featherstone Rovers		July 1996	
Jamie Coventry	Huddersfield Giants		December 1996	
