= 1997 Castleford Tigers season =

- Super League II Rank: 10th
- Play-off result: Premiership Trophy Semi final
- Challenge Cup: Fourth round
- 1997 record: Wins: 7; draws: 2; losses: 18
- Points scored: For: 418; against: 613

Team information
- Stadium: Wheldon Road
← 1996	List of seasons	1998 →

The 1997 Castleford Tigers season was the club's 2nd year in the Super League. The club finished in 10th place. Castleford Tigers also competed in the Challenge Cup, but were knocked out in the Fourth Round by Salford Reds.

== Table ==
Pos	Team	Pld	W	D	L	PF	PA	PD	Pts	Relegation
1	Bradford Bulls (C)	22	20	0	2	769	397	+372	40	
2	London Broncos	22	15	3	4	616	418	+198	33	
3	St Helens	22	14	1	7	592	506	+86	29	
4	Wigan	22	14	0	8	683	398	+285	28	
5	Leeds Rhinos	22	13	1	8	544	463	+81	27	
6	Salford Reds	22	11	0	11	428	495	−67	22	
7	Halifax Blue Sox	22	8	2	12	524	549	−25	18	
8	Sheffield Eagles	22	9	0	13	415	574	−159	18	
9	Warrington Wolves	22	8	0	14	437	647	−210	16	
10	Castleford Tigers	22	5	2	15	334	515	−181	12	
11	Paris Saint-Germain	22	6	0	16	362	572	−210	12	
12	Oldham Bears (R)	22	4	1	17	461	631	−170	9	Relegated to Division One

Source: Rugby League Project
Rules for classification: 1) Points; 2) Points difference; 3) Number of points scored;
(C) Champions; (R) Relegated

== Squad ==
No	Player	Apps	Tries	Goals	DGs	Points	Ref
1	Richard Gay	24	7	0	0	28	
2	Chris Smith	25	6	0	0	24	
3	David Chapman	12	4	0	0	16	
4	Grant Anderson	12	1	0	0	4	
5	Jason Roach	12	6	0	0	24	
6	Adrian Vowles	30	8	1	0	34	
8	Lee Crooks	12	0	13	0	26	
9	Richard Russell	26	1	0	0	4	
10	Dean Sampson	22	1	0	0	4	
11	Jason Lidden	24	7	0	0	28	
12	Brendon Tuuta	29	1	0	0	4	
13	Richard Goddard	5	0	6	0	12	
14	Graham Steadman	23	4	0	0	16	
16	Nathan Sykes	26	0	0	0	0	
17	Lee Harland	22	0	0	0	0	
18	Andrew Schick	25	5	0	0	20	
19	Ian Smales	5	0	0	0	0	
21	Jason Flowers	28	5	0	0	20	
22	Lee St Hilaire	6	0	0	0	0	
23	Simon Middleton	11	3	0	0	12	
24	Shaun Richardson	4	0	0	0	0	
25	Diccon Edwards	3	0	0	0	0	
26	Lee Bardauskas	1	0	0	0	0	
27	Spencer Hargrave	1	0	0	0	0	
28	Danny Orr	28	3	18	0	48	
30	Ian Tonks	14	2	6	0	20	
31	Mike Ford	22	1	0	3	7	
32	Jason Critchley	16	12	0	0	48	
33	Richard McKell	13	0	0	0	0	
34	Brad Davis	12	4	21	5	63	

== Transfers ==
=== In ===
Player	Pos	From	Fee	Date	Ref
Jason Lidden	Second-row	Canterbury Bulldogs		January 1997	

=== Out ===
Player	Pos	To	Fee	Date	Ref
Tony Smith	Scrum half	Wigan Warriors	£150,000	March 1997	
