= List of Broughton Rangers records =

Broughton Rangers was as English professional rugby league club. Formed in 1877 as Broughton, the club changed its name to Broughton Rangers a year later. The club was based in Broughton until 1933, playing at Wheater's Field (until 1913) and The Cliff (1913–1933), before moving to Belle Vue Stadium in Gorton. The club was later renamed as Belle Vue Rangers after the Second World War, but folded in 1955. Broughton Rangers won one league championship in 1902, and were Challenge Cup winners on two occasions (1902 and 1911).

The record for most appearances for the club is held by George Ruddick, who played 422 times between 1899 and 1915. Andy Hogg is the record try scorer with 186, while Albert Gregory holds the record for most goals scored, having kicked 308 conversions. The record for most points is held by Bill Harris who scored a total of 835 during his career.

== Honours ==
=== League ===
- Championship: 1901–02
- Lancashire Senior Competition: 1896–97, 1898–99
- South East Lancashire League: 1901–02

=== Cup ===
- Challenge Cup: 1901–02, 1910–11
- Lancashire Cup: 1906–07, 1920–21
- Salford Royal Hospital Cup: 1931–32, 1934–35

== Club records ==
=== Matches ===
- Record win: 59–0 against Barton, 8 March 1913.
- Record defeat: 2–70 against Wigan, 28 September 1940.

== Individual records ==
=== Appearances ===
- Most consecutive appearances: 137, Melbourne Tierney (23 September 1950 to 5 December 1953).

==== Most appearances ====
No	Name	Club career	Apps
1	George Ruddick	1899–1915	422
2	Jack Beetham	1902–1922	374
3	Billy Winskill	1899–1920	350
4	Andy Hogg	1899–1910	339
5	Dick Manning	1933–1948	311
6	Melbourne Tierney	1946–1955	311
7	Billy Harris	1901–1915	302
8	Glyn Jones	1933–1951	291
9	Billy Barlow	1905–1920	286
10	Billy Bentham	1919–1929	285

=== Tries ===
- Most tries in a season: 33, Bob Wilson in the 1901–02 season.
- Most tries in a match:
  - 6, Claude James (against Liverpool City, 13 October 1906).
  - 6, Walter Scott (against Barton, 8 March 1913).
  - 6, Clifford Mills (against Bramley, 7 April 1934).

==== Top tryscorers ====
No	Name	Club career	Tries
1	Andy Hogg	1899–1915	186
2	Bob Wilson	1901–1915	141
3	Billy Harris	1901–1915	123
4	Billy Bentham	1919–1929	112
5	Tom Kenny	1933–1949	89

=== Goals ===
- Most goals in a season: 86, Albert Gregory in the 1950–51 season.
- Most goals in a match:
  - 10, Joe Nelson (against Rothwell, 18 March 1899).
  - 10, Billy Harris (against Liverpool City, 13 October 1906).

==== Top goalscorers ====
No	Name	Club career	Goals
1	Albert Gregory	1948–1955	308
2	Billy Harris	1901–1915	233
3	Bryn Howells	1935–1941	217
4	George Davidson	1910–1924	193
5	Billy Stott	1933–1940	154
