= 1906–07 Yorkshire Cup =

1906 Yorkshire Cup
- Structure: Regional knockout championship
- Teams: 15
- Winners: Bradford
- Runners-up: Hull Kingston Rovers

The 1906 Yorkshire Cup was the second in the Rugby Football League club tournament's history. It was a knock-out competition between (mainly professional) rugby league clubs from the English county of Yorkshire. The actual area was at times increased to encompass other teams from outside the county such as Newcastle, Mansfield, Coventry, and even London (in the form of Acton & Willesden.

The Rugby League season always (until the onset of "Summer Rugby" in 1996) ran from around August-time through to around May-time and this competition always took place early in the season, in the Autumn, with the final taking place in (or just before) December (The only exception to this was when disruption of the fixture list was caused during, and immediately after, the two World Wars)

1906 was the second occasion on which the Yorkshire Cup competition had been held.

This year there were two new clubs to contest the final.

Bradford won the trophy by beating Hull Kingston Rovers by the score of 8–5

The match was played at Belle Vue, in the City of Wakefield, now in West Yorkshire. The attendance was 10,500 and receipts were £286

== Background ==
Brighouse Rangers, Castleford (1896) and Normanton left the league and the three non league clubs from last season were not invited, but they were replaced by junior/amateur club New Blackpool. This resulted in an overall decrease of five clubs, leaving a total of fifteen entrants.

This, in turn, resulted in one bye in the first round.

Pontefract resigned after 8 league matches and their record was expunged, but by this time, they had played (and lost) in this competition.

== Competition and results ==
=== Round 1 ===
Involved 7 matches (with one bye) and 15 Clubs

Game No	Fixture date	Home team	Score	Away team	Venue	Ref
1	Sat 13 Oct 1906	Bradford	68–2	Bramley	Park Avenue	
2	Sat 13 Oct 1906	Dewsbury	10–27	Huddersfield	Crown Flatt	
3	Sat 13 Oct 1906	Hull	3–6	Halifax	Boulevard	
4	Sat 13 Oct 1906	Hull Kingston Rovers	44–0	Pontefract	Craven Street (off Holderness Road)	
5	Sat 13 Oct 1906	Keighley	34–2	New Blackpool (Note: New Blackpool is/was a junior/amateur club (possibly from the Leeds area))	Lawkholme Lane	
6	Sat 13 Oct 1906	Wakefield Trinity	7–19	Leeds	Belle Vue	
7	Sat 13 Oct 1906	York	8–7	Batley	Clarence Street	
8		Hunslet		bye		

=== Round 2 – Quarterfinals ===
Involved 4 matches and 8 Clubs

Game No	Fixture date	Home team	Score	Away team	Venue	Ref
1	Sat 27 Oct 1906	Bradford	21–5	Leeds	Park Avenue	
2	Sat 27 Oct 1906	Halifax	6–0	Hunslet	Thrum Hall	
3	Sat 27 Oct 1906	Hull Kingston Rovers	11–3	Huddersfield	Craven Street (off Holderness Road)	
4	Sat 27 Oct 1906	Keighley	34–2	York	Lawkholme Lane	

=== Round 3 – semifinals ===
Involved 2 matches and 4 Clubs

Game No	Fixture date	Home team	Score	Away team	Venue	Ref
1	Sat 17 Nov 1906	Bradford	6–4	Halifax	Park Avenue	
2	Sat 17 Nov 1906	Hull Kingston Rovers	21–0	Keighley	Craven Street (off Holderness Road)	

=== Final ===
Game No	Fixture date	Home team	Score	Away team	Venue	Att	Rec	Ref
	Saturday 1 December 1906	Bradford	8–5	Hull Kingston Rovers	Belle Vue (Note: Belle Vue is the home ground of Wakefield Trinity with a capacity of approximately 12,500. The record attendance was 37,906 on the 21 March 1936 in the Challenge Cup semi-final between Leeds and Huddersfield)	10500	286	

==== Teams and scorers ====
Bradford	№	Hull Kingston Rovers
	teams	
Gomer Gunn	1	Alf Carmichael
James Dechan	2	George West
Ervine Mosby	3	Billy Phipps
F. Heseltine	4	Dan Rees
J. Connell	5	W. Madley
S. Brear	6	Jim Barry
Thomas Surman	7	A. Lofthouse
Alex Laidlaw	8	Jim Gath
N. Greenwood	9	H. W. Smith
H. Francis	10	Arthur Spackman
Alf Mann	11	G. J. Hambrecht
Harry Feather	12	Sam Sherwood
H. Walton	13	Andrew Windle
	Coach	
8	score	5
8	HT	3
	Scorers	
	Tries	
James Dechan (1)	T	George West (1)
S. Brear (1)	T	
	Goals	
Alex Laidlaw (1)	G	W. Madley (1)
	G	
	Drop Goals	
	DG	
Referee		William McCutcheon (Oldham)

Scoring – Try = four points – Goal = two points – Drop goal = one point

=== The road to success ===
First round
Bradford	68
Bramley	2
Wakefield Trinity	7
Leeds	19
Keighley	34
New Blackpool	2
York	8
Batley	7
Hull Kingston Rovers	44
Pontefract	0
Dewsbury	10
Huddersfield	27
Hull	3
Halifax	6
Hunslet
bye

Second round
Bradford	21
Leeds	5
Keighley	34
York	2
Hull Kingston Rovers	11
Huddersfield	3
Halifax	6
Hunslet	0

Semifinals
Bradford	6
Keighley	4
Hull Kingston Rovers	21
Halifax	0

Final
Bradford	8
Hull Kingston Rovers	5

== See also ==
- 1906–07 Northern Rugby Football Union season
- Rugby league county cups
