= Glyn Jones =

Glyn Jones may refer to:

- Glyn Jones (figure skater) (born 1953), British figure skater at the 1976 Winter Olympics
- Glyn Jones (footballer, born 1936), English footballer
- Glyn Jones (footballer, born 1959), Welsh footballer
- Glyn Jones (rugby league), rugby league footballer of the 1940s for Wales, and Broughton Rangers
- Glyn Jones (South African writer) (1931–2014), South African writer and actor
- Glyn Jones (Welsh writer) (1905–1995), Welsh writer
- Glyn Smallwood Jones (1908–1992), British colonial administrator

== See also ==
- Glyn Johns
