= Spottswood =

Spottswood may refer to:

Given name:

- Spottswood William Robinson III (1916–1998), American educator, civil rights attorney, and federal judge
- Spottswood Poles (1887–1962), American outfielder in baseball's Negro leagues
- Spottswood Bolling, plaintiff in the Civil Rights lawsuit Bolling v. Sharpe (1954)

Surname:

- Alexander Spottswood (1676–1740), Lieutenant-Colonel in the British Army and a noted Lieutenant Governor of Virginia
- Richard K. Spottswood (born 1937), musicologist and author from Maryland, catalogued thousands of recordings of vernacular music in the United States
- Stephen Gill Spottswood (1897–1974), religious leader and civil rights activist known for his work as bishop of the African Methodist Episcopal Zion Church (AMEZ)

Geography:

- Spottswood, Virginia, unincorporated community in Augusta County, Virginia, United States

== See also ==
- Spotswood (disambiguation)
- Spottiswoode (disambiguation)
