= Rostron =

Rostron can be a middle name or a surname. Notable people with the name include:

== Middle name ==
- Albert Rostron Parker, English musician

== Surname ==
- Arthur Rostron (1869–1940), master of the ocean liner RMS Carpathia
- Cindy Rostron, Australian model
- Jam Rahuoja Rostron, English musician
- Kim Rostron (born 1974), English amateur golfer
- Nathan Rostron (born 2004), New Zealand footballer
- Sheldon Rostron, South African field hockey coach
- Sidney Nowell Rostron (1883–1948), Church of England priest, theologian, and academic
- Thurston Rostron, English footballer
- Tommy Rostron, English rugby league footballer
- Wilf Rostron (born 1956), English footballer
