= Spotswood =

Spotswood can refer to:

== People ==
- Alexander Spotswood (1676–1740), the Lieutenant-Governor of Virginia
- Denis Spotswood (1916–2001), Marshal of the Royal Air Force

== Places ==
- Spotswood, Victoria, a suburb of Melbourne, Australia
  - Spotswood railway station
- Spotswood, New Jersey
- Spotswood, New Zealand, a suburb of New Plymouth
- Robert L. Spotswood House in Mobile, Alabama, U.S.
- Spotswood College in New Zealand
- Spotswood High School (disambiguation), various high schools

== Film ==
- Spotswood, a 1992 Australian film starring Anthony Hopkins

== See also ==
- Spottiswoode (disambiguation)
- Spottswood (disambiguation)
