= Silas Warwick =

GB & England international rugby league footballer

Personal information
- Full name: Silas Warwick
- Born: second ¼ 1879 Whitehaven, England
- Died: 9 March 1937 (aged 57) Broughton, Salford, England

Playing information
- Height: 5 ft 11 in (180 cm)
- Weight: 13 st 8 lb (86.2 kg; 190.0 lb)
- Position: Forward
Club
Years	Team	Pld	T	G	FG	P
1902–04	Broughton Rangers	36	0	0	0	0
1904–11	Salford	209	20	1	0	62
	Total	245	20	1	0	62
Representative
Years	Team	Pld	T	G	FG	P
1900–10	Cumberland	11	≥1
1908	England	1	0	0	0	0
1908	Great Britain	2	0	0	0	0

Silas Warwick (second ¼ 1879 – 9 March 1937) was an English professional rugby league footballer who played in the 1900s and 1910s. He played at representative level for Great Britain, England and Cumberland, and at club level for Whitehaven Recreation ARLFC, Broughton Rangers and Salford, as a forward.

== Background ==
Silas Warwick was born in Whitehaven, Cumberland, and his death aged 57 was registered in Salford, Lancashire, England.

== Playing career ==
=== International honours ===
Warwick won a cap for England while at Salford in the 18-35 defeat by Wales at King George's Park (Athletic Ground), Tonypandy on Monday 20 April 1908, and won caps for Great Britain while at Salford in the 14-6 victory over New Zealand at Headingley, Leeds on Saturday 25 January 1908, becoming the first player from Cumberland to play in a test match, and the 6-18 defeat by New Zealand at Stamford Bridge, London on Saturday 8 February 1908.

=== County honours ===
Warwick won caps for Cumberland, while at Whitehaven Recreation ARLFC he made his début for Cumberland against Cheshire at Birkenhead on Saturday 10 November 1900, and while at Salford scoring a try in the 21-9 victory over New Zealand at Workington in 1907, and the 11-2 victory over Australia at Carlisle in 1909.

=== Challenge Cup Final appearances ===
Warwick played as a forward and was sent-off for fighting with Bradford FC's Harry Feather, in Salford's 0-5 defeat by Bradford F.C. in the 1906 Challenge Cup Final during the 1905–06 season at Headingley, Leeds on Saturday 28 April 1906.

=== Club career ===
Warwick initially played for Whitehaven Recreation ARLFC, he made his début for Broughton Rangers in the 17-3 victory over Hull F.C. at Wheater's Field, Broughton on Saturday 13 September 1902, he made his début for Salford in the 6-11 defeat by Leigh at The Willows, Salford on Saturday 24 December 1904, he played in the defeat by Hull F.C. in the 1907 Challenge Cup semi-final during the 1906–07 season, scored his only conversion in the 64-0 victory over York INL ARLFC the first-round of the 1910 Challenge Cup during the 1909–10 season, and played in the defeat by Oldham in the 1910 Challenge Cup semi-final during the 1909–10 season, his last match for Salford was against former club Broughton Rangers at Wheater's Field, Broughton on Saturday 9 September 1911.
