= Spottiswoode =

Spottiswoode or Spottiswood may refer to:

== People ==
- Spottiswoode (surname)

== Commerce ==
- Eyre & Spottiswoode Ltd., London-based printing firm

== Places ==
- a former (until 1903) name of Spotswood, Victoria, a suburb of Melbourne, Australia
- Spottiswoode Park Estate, a housing area and former plantation in Singapore
- Famoso, California, an unincorporated community formerly known as Spottiswood

== See also ==
- Spotswood (disambiguation)
