= 1911–12 Yorkshire Cup =

- Structure: Regional knockout championship
- Teams: 13
- Winners: Huddersfield
- Runners-up: Hull Kingston Rovers

The 1911–12 Yorkshire Cup was the seventh occasion on which the Yorkshire Cup competition, a Rugby league tournament, was held. This year saw a previous winner, Huddersfield, win the trophy by beating Hull Kingston Rovers by the score of 22–10

The match was played at Belle Vue, in the City of Wakefield, now in West Yorkshire. The attendance was 20,000 and receipts were £700. This was Huddersfield's third appearance in what would be seven appearances in eight consecutive finals between 1909 and 1919 (which included four successive victories and six in total.)

== Background ==
This season there were no junior/amateur clubs taking part, but last year's new entrant Coventry left to join the Lancashire Cup, reducing the number of entries by one to a total of thirteen. This in turn resulted in three byes in the first round.

== Competition and results ==
=== Round 1 ===
Involved 5 matches (with three byes) and 13 clubs

Game No	Fixture date	Home team	Score	Away team	Venue	Ref
1	Sat 11 Oct 1911	Hull	2–8	Hunslet	Boulevard	
2	Sat 14 Oct 1911	Bramley	3–25	Dewsbury	Barley Mow	
3	Sat 14 Oct 1911	Huddersfield	15–2	Batley	Fartown	
4	Sat 14 Oct 1911	Hull Kingston Rovers	23–9	Wakefield Trinity	Hull Kingston Rovers	
5	Sat 14 Oct 1911	Leeds	17–5	Keighley	Headingley	
6		Bradford Northern		bye		
7		Halifax		bye		
8		York		bye		

=== Round 2 – quarterfinals ===
Involved 4 matches and 8 clubs

Game No	Fixture date	Home team	Score	Away team	Venue	Ref
1	Sat 14 Oct 1911	Bradford Northern	9–24	Hunslet	Birch Lane (Note: The first Yorkshire Cup game played at this ground, to which Bradford Northern moved for season 1908–09)	
2	Sat 28 Oct 1911	Huddersfield	34–6	Dewsbury	Fartown	
3	Sat 28 Oct 1911	Hull Kingston Rovers	15–2	York	Hull Kingston Rovers	
4	Sat 28 Oct 1911	Leeds	9–2	Halifax	Headingley	

=== Round 3 – semifinals ===
Involved 2 matches and 4 clubs

Game No	Fixture date	Home team	Score	Away team	Venue	Ref
1	Sat 11 Nov 1911	Hunslet	3–5	Huddersfield	Parkside	
2	Sat 11 Nov 1911	Leeds	0–11	Hull Kingston Rovers	Headingley	

=== Final ===
Game No	Fixture date	Home team	Score	Away team	Venue	Att	Rec	Ref
	Saturday 25 November 1911	Huddersfield	22–10	Hull Kingston Rovers	Belle Vue (Note: Belle Vue is the home ground of Wakefield Trinity with a capacity of approximately 12,500. The record attendance was 37,906 on the 21 March 1936 in the Challenge Cup semi-final between Leeds and Huddersfield)	20000	700	

==== Teams and scorers ====
Huddersfield	№	Hull Kingston Rovers
	teams	
Jack Bartholomew	1	Alf Carmichael
Albert Rosenfeld	2	George Spivey
Edgar Wrigley	3	Phil Thomas
Harold Wagstaff	4	R. Hughes
Stan Moorhouse	5	J. Charles "Slasher" Brain
Thomas Grey	6	Bruce Craven
Jim Davies	7	Thomas Surman
W. Brook	8	Arthur Moore
Con Byrne	9	William "Bill" Huskins
Douglas Clark	10	Jake Blackmore
Ben Gronow	11	Arthur Spackman
John Higson	12	C. McDonald
Herbert Sherwood	13	R. Fearnley
??	Coach	(??)
22	score	10
16	HT	2
	Scorers	
	Tries	
John Higson (1)	T	R. Hughes (1)
Albert "Rozzi" Rosenfeld (1)	T	C. McDonald (1)
Edgar Wrigley (1)	T	
Harold Wagstaff (1)	T	
Stan Moorhouse (1)	T	
Thomas Grey (1)	T	
	Goals	
Thomas Grey (2)	G	Alf Carmichael (2)
	G	
	Drop Goals	
	DG	
Referee		J. F. May (St. Helens)

Scoring – Try = three (3) points – Goal = two (2) points – Drop goal = two (2) points

=== The road to success ===
First round
Bradford Northern
bye
Hull	2
Hunslet	8
Huddersfield	16
Batley	2
Bramley	3
Dewsbury	25
Leeds	17
Keighley	5
Halifax
bye
Hull Kingston Rovers	23
Wakefield Trinity	9
York
bye

Second round
Bradford Northern	9
Hunslet	24
Huddersfield	34
Dewsbury	6
Leeds	9
Halifax	2
Hull Kingston Rovers	15
York	2

Semifinals
Hunslet	3
Huddersfield	6
Leeds	0
Hull Kingston Rovers	11

Final
Huddersfield	22
Hull Kingston Rovers	10

== See also ==
- 1911–12 Northern Rugby Football Union season
- Rugby league county cups
