= 1931–32 Yorkshire Cup =

24th occasion of the Yorkshire Cup

- Structure: Regional knockout championship
- Teams: 15
- Winners: Huddersfield
- Runners-up: Hunslet

The 1931–32 Yorkshire Cup was the twenty-fourth occasion on which the Yorkshire Cup competition had been held. Huddersfield won the trophy (for the eighth time) by beating Hunslet in the final by the score of 4–2.

== Background ==
The Rugby Football League's Yorkshire Cup competition was a knock-out competition between (mainly professional) rugby league clubs from the county of Yorkshire. The actual area was at times increased to encompass other teams from outside the county such as Newcastle, Mansfield, Coventry, and even London (in the form of Acton & Willesden.

The Rugby League season always (until the onset of "Summer Rugby" in 1996) ran from around August-time through to around May-time and this competition always took place early in the season, in the Autumn, with the final taking place in (or just before) December (The only exception to this was when disruption of the fixture list was caused during, and immediately after, the two World Wars).

== Competition and results ==
This season there were no junior/amateur clubs taking part, no new entrants, and no "leavers" and so the total of entries remained the same at fifteen. This in turn resulted in one bye in the first round.

=== Round 1 ===
Involved 7 matches (with one bye) and 15 clubs

Game No	Fixture date	Home team	Score	Away team	Venue	Ref
1	Sat 10 Oct 1931	Batley	4–24	Leeds	Mount Pleasant	
2	Sat 10 Oct 1931	Bradford Northern	5–11	Huddersfield	Birch Lane	
3	Sat 10 Oct 1931	Castleford	4–12	Dewsbury	Wheldon Road	
4	Sat 10 Oct 1931	Hull	33–7	Keighley	Boulevard	
5	Sat 10 Oct 1931	Hull Kingston Rovers	6–2	Wakefield Trinity	Craven Park (1)	
6	Sat 10 Oct 1931	Hunslet	50–11	Bramley	Parkside	
7	Sat 10 Oct 1931	York	3–0	Halifax	Clarence Street	
8		Featherstone Rovers		bye		

=== Round 2 – quarterfinals ===
Involved 4 matches and 8 clubs

Game No	Fixture date	Home team	Score	Away team	Venue	Ref
1	Wed 14 Oct 1931	Hunslet	27–7	Hull Kingston Rovers	Parkside	
2	Mon 19 Oct 1931	Featherstone Rovers	5–15	Huddersfield	Post Office Road	
3	Tue 20 Oct 1931	Dewsbury	5–9	Hull	Crown Flatt	
4	Wed 21 Oct 1931	Leeds	9–14	York	Headingley	

=== Round 3 – semifinals ===
Involved 2 matches and 4 clubs

Game No	Fixture date	Home team	Score	Away team	Venue	Ref
1	Wed 4 Nov 1931	York	2–2	Huddersfield	Clarence Street	
2	Thu 5 Nov 1931	Hull	0–15	Hunslet	Boulevard	

=== Semifinal - replays ===
Involved 1 match and 2 clubs

Game No	Fixture date	Home team	Score	Away team	Venue	Ref
R	Mon 9 Nov 1931	Huddersfield	10–7	York	Fartown	

=== Final ===
The final was played at Headingley, Leeds, now in West Yorkshire. The attendance was 27,800 and receipts were £1,764. The attendance was the second highest attendance recorded to date at the Yorkshire Cup final behind the record of 33,719 from 1922.

Game No	Fixture date	Home team	Score	Away team	Venue	Att	Rec	Notes	Ref
	Saturday 21 November 1931	Huddersfield	4–2	Hunslet	Headingley	27,800	£1,764	(Note: The attendance is given as 27,800 by RUGBYLEAGUEproject but 27,000 by the Rothmans Rugby League Yearbook of 1991-92 and 1990-91) (Note: Headingley, Leeds, is the home ground of Leeds RLFC with a capacity of 21,000. The record attendance was 40,175 for a league match between Leeds and Bradford Northern on 21 May 1947.)	

==== Teams and scorers ====
Huddersfield	No.	Hunslet
	Teams	
John William Stocks	1	Jack Walkington
Ernie Mills	2	George Broughton
Len Bowkett	3	Johnny Coulson
Gwyn Parker	4	Johnson
Robert Walker	5	William Adams
Idris Towill	6	George Todd
Ernest Thompson	7	Billy Thornton
John Rudd	8	David Morgan Jenkins
Cyril Halliday	9	Les White
Clifford Morton	10	James Traill
Henry Tiffany	11	Frank Dawson
Tom Banks	12	Hector Crowther
Fred Talbot	13	Harry Beverley
??	Coach	??
4	score	2
2	HT	0
	Scorers	
	Goals	
Leonard Bowkett (1)	G	
J. William "Willie" Stocks (1)	G	
Referee		J. Eddon (Swinton)

Scoring - Try = three (3) points - Goal = two (2) points - Drop goal = two (2) points

=== The road to success ===
First round
Batley	4
Leeds	24
York	3
Halifax	0
Featherstone Rovers
bye
Bradford Northern	5
Huddersfield	11
Castleford	4
Dewsbury	12
Hull	33
Keighley	7
Hunslet	50
Bramley	11
Hull Kingston Rovers	6
Wakefield Trinity	2

Second round
Leeds	9
York	14
Featherstone Rovers	5
Huddersfield	15
Dewsbury	5
Hull	9
Hunslet	27
Hull Kingston Rovers	7

Semifinals
York	2 (7)
Huddersfield	2 (10)
Hull	0
Hunslet	15

Final
Huddersfield	4
Hunslet	2

== See also ==
- 1931–32 Northern Rugby Football League season
- Rugby league county cups
