= Spottiswoode (surname) =

Spottiswoode, also Spottiswood, is a surname of Scottish origin. It was first used by Robert de Spottiswoode and his descendants.

Notable people with the surname include:

- Alicia Ann Spottiswoode (1810–1900), Scottish songwriter
- Andrew Spottiswoode (1787–1866), British politician
- Frank Spottiswoode, English professional rugby league footballer of the 1900s
- Frank Spottiswoode Aitken (1868–1933), Scottish-American silent film actor
- James Spottiswood (1567-1645), Scottish bishop, 2nd son of next
- John Spottiswood (1510-1585), religious reformer
- John Spottiswoode (1565–1633), Archbishop of St Andrews, elder son of prec.
- Jonathan Spottiswoode (born 1964), British musician, writer, and filmmaker
- Roger Spottiswoode (born 1945), Canadian-British film director and screenwriter
- William Spottiswoode, FRS (1825–1883), English mathematician and physicist, son of Andrew
