= Arthur Royle =

England international rugby union player

- Full name: Arthur V. Royle
- Born: 28 January 1862 Salford, England
- Died: 17 March 1942 (aged 80) Ilsington, England

Rugby union career
- Position: Fullback
Senior career
| Years | Team | Apps | (Points) |
| – | Broughton Rangers | | |
International career
| Years | Team | Apps | (Points) |
| 1889 | England | 1 | (0) |

Arthur V. Royle (28 January 1862 – 17 March 1942) was an English rugby union footballer who played in the 1880s. He played at representative level for England, and at club level for Broughton Rangers, as a fullback. Prior to 2 June 1896, Broughton Rangers was a rugby union club.

== Background ==
Arthur Royle was born in Salford, Lancashire, and he died aged 80 in Ilsington, Devon.

== Playing career ==
Arthur Royle won a cap for England while at Broughton Rangers in 1889 against New Zealand Natives.
