= Colin Maskill =

English rugby league footballer and coach

Personal information
- Born: 15 March 1964 (age 62) Wakefield, England

Playing information
- Position: Hooker
Club
Years	Team	Pld	T	G	FG	P
1981–84	Wakefield Trinity	67	13	169	4	377
1984–94	Leeds	218	22	166	1	421
1994–95	Doncaster	19	0	0	0	0
1995–96	Castleford	25	7	8	0	44
1996	Featherstone Rovers	14	1	12	1	29
1997–99	Doncaster Dragons	26	2	11	2	32
	Total	369	45	366	8	903
Representative
Years	Team	Pld	T	G	FG	P
1983	Great Britain U-24	1	1	0	0	4

Coaching information
Club
Years	Team	Gms	W	D	L	W%
1998	Doncaster Dragons

Colin Maskill (born 15 March 1964) is an English former professional rugby league footballer who played in the 1980s and 1990s, and coached in the 1990s and 2000s. He played at club level for Wakefield Trinity, Leeds, Doncaster (two spells), Castleford and Featherstone Rovers, as a goal-kicking hooker, and coached at club level for Doncaster Dragons and Castleford (assistant coach).

Since retiring, Colin had a spell in a logistical role with the England Rugby League team, including for the World Cup in 2022, and now works as Past Players Co-Ordinator for the independent charity Rugby League Cares.

sources RLCares | About us, Link-up with Colin Maskill the perfect ‘marriage’ for England coach Shaun Wane

== Background ==
Colin Maskill's birth was registered in Wakefield, West Riding of Yorkshire, England.

== Playing career ==
=== County Cup Final appearances ===
Colin Maskill played hooker in Leeds' 33-12 victory over Castleford in the 1988 Yorkshire Cup Final during the 1988–89 season at Elland Road, Leeds on Sunday 16 October 1988.

=== John Player Special Trophy Final appearances ===
Colin Maskill played hooker in Leeds' 14-15 defeat by St. Helens in the 1987–88 John Player Special Trophy Final during the 1987–88 season at Central Park, Wigan on Saturday 9 January 1988.

=== Club career ===
Colin Maskill made his début for Wakefield Trinity during February 1982, he played his last match for Wakefield Trinity during the 1984–85 season, he made his début for Featherstone Rovers during the 1996 season, and he played his last match for Featherstone Rovers on Sunday 21 July 1996.

== Genealogical information ==
Colin Maskill is the father of the rugby league hooker for Wakefield Trinity Wildcats, Leeton Galloping Greens (in Leeton, New South Wales, Australia), Queanbeyan Kangaroos of the Canberra Rugby League (in Queanbeyan, New South Wales, Australia), and Featherstone Rovers; Danny "Dan" Maskill (born c. 1995 (age 30–31)).
