= Bernard Poole =

England international rugby league footballer

Personal information
- Full name: Bernard Poole
- Born: Hunslet, England

Playing information
- Position: Second-row
Club
Years	Team	Pld	T	G	FG	P
1947–50	Hull F.C.	73	8	1	0	26
1950–57	Leeds	286	50	0	1	152
	Total	359	58	1	1	178
Representative
Years	Team	Pld	T	G	FG	P
1950–56	Yorkshire	9	1	0	0	3
1950	England	1	0	0	0	0

Bernard Poole is an English former professional rugby league footballer who played in the 1950s. He played at representative level for England and Yorkshire, and at club level for Hull F.C. and Leeds, as a second-row.

== Playing career ==
=== Challenge Cup Final appearances ===
Poole played at second-row in Leeds' 9-7 victory over Barrow in the 1956–57 Challenge Cup Final during the 1956–57 season at Wembley Stadium, London on Saturday 11 May 1957, in front of a crowd of 76,318.

=== International honours ===
Poole won a cap for England while at Leeds in 1950 against France.
