= Alfred Teggin =

England international rugby union player & cricketer

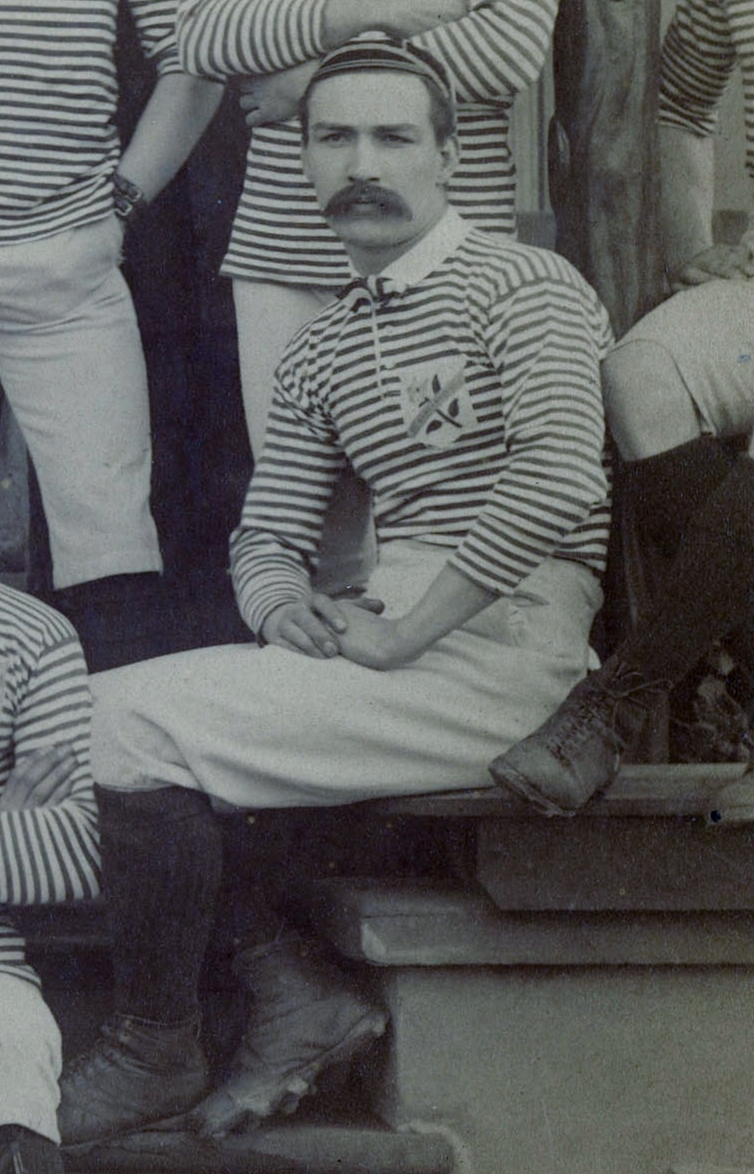
- Born: Alfred Teggin; 22 October 1860 Broughton, Lancashire, England
- Died: 23 July 1941 (aged 80) Cleveleys, Lancashire, England

Rugby union career
- Position: Forward
Amateur team(s)
Years	Team	Apps	(Points)
1884–87	Broughton Rangers		
–	Lancashire		
International career
Years	Team	Apps	(Points)
1884–87	England	6	

Alfred Teggin (22 October 1860 – 23 July 1941) was a rugby union footballer, and cricketer of the 1880s. He played representative level rugby union (RU) for England, and at club level for Broughton Rangers, as a forward, e.g. front row, lock, or back row, and county level cricket for Lancashire County Cricket Club.

== Background ==
Alfred Teggin was born in Broughton, Lancashire, and he died aged 80 in Cleveleys, Lancashire.

== Playing career ==
=== Domestic career ===
Teggin played his club rugby for Broughton Rangers, and played county rugby for Lancashire. At the time Broughton Rangers played rugby union, but in 1895 they ceded from the Rugby Football Union, that governed the sport in England, and helped found the Northern Union. This eventually developed into the separate sport of rugby league.

=== International honours ===
Alfred Teggin won caps for England while at Broughton Rangers in 1884 against Ireland, in 1885 against Wales, in 1886 against Ireland, and Scotland, and in 1887 against Ireland, and Scotland.

In the early years of rugby football the goal was to score goals, and a try had zero value, but it provided the opportunity to try at goal, and convert the try to a goal with an unopposed kick at the goal posts. The point values of both the try and goal have varied over time, and in the early years footballers could "score" a try, without scoring any points.

== Cricketing career ==
Alfred Teggin played six first-class matches for Lancashire in the 1886 English cricket season.

== Genealogical information ==
Alfred Teggin's marriage to Clara Louisa (née Unsworth) was registered during October–December 1892 in Chorlton district.

Alfred Teggin's is also a close relative of Coventry born footballer Brian Teggin who played for Chelsea 1959 to 1960
