= William Stocks =

England international rugby league footballer

Personal information
- Full name: John William Stocks
- Born: unknown
- Died: unknown

Playing information
- Position: Fullback
Club
Years	Team	Pld	T	G	FG	P
	Dewsbury
1928–31	Huddersfield	100	2	26	0	61
1931–33	Bradford Northern	61	1	19	1	43
	Total	161	3	45	1	104
Representative
Years	Team	Pld	T	G	FG	P
1926–30	Yorkshire	4	0	0	0	0
1930	England	1	0	0	0	0

John William "Willie" Stocks (birth unknown – death unknown) was an English professional rugby league footballer who played in the 1920s and 1930s. He played at representative level for England and Yorkshire, and at club level for Huddersfield and Dewsbury, as a fullback.

== Playing career ==
=== Huddersfield ===
Stocks was signed by Huddersfield from Dewsbury in October 1928.

Stocks played fullback and scored a goal in Huddersfield's 4–2 victory over Hunslet in the 1931 Yorkshire Cup Final during the 1931–32 season at Headingley, Leeds on Saturday 21 November 1931.

He was transferred to Bradford Northern in December 1931.

=== Representative honours ===
Stocks won caps for Yorkshire while at Huddersfield (two caps), and Dewsbury (two caps).

Stocks won a cap for England while at Huddersfield in 1930 against Other Nationalities.

== Personal life ==
Stocks married in April 1924 to Doris Lamb.
