= Geoff Tullock =

England international rugby league footballer (born 1929)

Personal information
- Full name: Geoffrey Tullock
- Born: c. 1928; Sculcoates district, England
- Died: 2006 (aged 78)

Playing information
- Position: Wing
Club
Years	Team	Pld	T	G	FG	P
≤1951–≥51	Hull Kingston Rovers	167	66	0	0	198
Representative
Years	Team	Pld	T	G	FG	P
1951/52	Yorkshire	≥1
1951	England	1	1	0	0	3

Geoffrey Tullock (c. 1928 – 2006) was an English professional rugby league footballer who played in the 1950s. He played at representative level for England and Yorkshire, and at club level for Hull Kingston Rovers, as a wing.

== Background ==
Geoff Tullock's birth was registered in Sculcoates district, East Riding of Yorkshire, England, he is the grandson of the rugby union and rugby league footballer who played for Hull Kingston Rovers in the 1890s; H. Tullock/H. Tullock.

== Playing career ==
=== International honours ===
Geoff Tullock won a cap for England while at Hull Kingston Rovers in 1951 against Wales.

=== County honours ===
Geoff Tullock won cap(s) for Yorkshire while at Hull Kingston Rovers in 1951/52 against Cumberland.

== Note ==
Tullock's surname is variously spelt "correctly" with a "k" as Tullock, or "incorrectly" with a "h" as Tulloch
