= Fred Oliver =

English rugby league footballer

Personal information
- Full name: Frederick William Oliver

Playing information
- Position: Centre
Club
Years	Team	Pld	T	G	FG	P
	Hull F.C.
1907–13	York
	Hull Kingston Rovers
	Total	0	0	0	0	0
Representative
Years	Team	Pld	T	G	FG	P
1907–10	Yorkshire	6	0	0	0	0
1909	England	1	0	0	0	0

Frederick William Oliver was a rugby league footballer who played as a centre for Hull F.C., York and Hull Kingston Rovers. He also represented Yorkshire and England.

== Playing career ==
He was transferred to York in August 1907. He joined Hull Kingston Rovers in November 1913.

He won one cap for England against Wales in December 1909.

During the First World War, he played in a combined Hull Kingston Rovers-Hull F.C. team in an exhibition match against the Australian and New Zealand Army Corps (ANZACs).
