= Jack Lally =

England international rugby league footballer

Personal information
- Full name: John Lally
- Born: unknown
- Died: unknown

Playing information
Club
Years	Team	Pld	T	G	FG	P
1900–13	Widnes	306	29	31	0	149
Representative
Years	Team	Pld	T	G	FG	P
1909	England	2	0	0	0	0

John "Jack" Lally was an English professional rugby league footballer who played in the 1900s and 1910s. He played at representative level for England, and at club level for Widnes.

== International honours ==
Jack Lally won caps for England while at Widnes in 1909 against Australia (2 matches), and was Widnes' first England representative.
