= Arthur Wood (rugby league) =

England international rugby league player (1926-2002)

Personal information
- Full name: Arthur Wood
- Born: 6 August 1926 Castleford, England
- Died: 2002 (aged 75)

Playing information
- Position: Hooker
Club
Years	Team	Pld	T	G	FG	P
1948–51	Featherstone Rovers	105	1	0	0	3
1951–57	Leeds	202	3	0	0	9
	Bramley
	Total	307	4	0	0	12
Representative
Years	Team	Pld	T	G	FG	P
1950–52	Yorkshire	6	0	0	0	0
1954	Rugby League XIII	1
1951	England	1	0	0	0	0

Arthur Wood (6 August 1926 – 2002) was an English professional rugby league footballer who played in the 1940s and 1950s. He played at representative level for England, Rugby League XIII and Yorkshire, and at club level for Featherstone Rovers, and Leeds, as a hooker.

== Playing career ==
=== Club career ===
Wood made his début for Featherstone Rovers on Saturday 14 February 1948.

=== Representative honours ===
Wood won a cap for England while at Featherstone Rovers in 1951 against Other Nationalities, and represented Rugby League XIII while at Leeds in 1954 against Australasia.

Wood won caps for Yorkshire while at Featherstone Rovers; during the 1950–51 season against Lancashire and Cumberland.

== Death ==
Wood died in 2002, at the age of 75.
