= Arthur Moore (rugby league) =

England international rugby league footballer

Personal information
- Full name: Arthur Moore

Playing information
- Position: Forward
Club
Years	Team	Pld	T	G	FG	P
≤1913–≥20	Hull Kingston Rovers	342	90	1	0	272
Representative
Years	Team	Pld	T	G	FG	P
1913	England	1	0	0	0	0

Arthur Moore was an English professional rugby league footballer who played in the 1910s and 1920s. He played at representative level for England, and at club level for Hull Kingston Rovers (captain), as a forward.He was born Arthur Mawer in Hull in 1886 and died in 1956 (cite The Robins - An official History of Hull Kingston Rovers - Roger Pugh ISBN 978-0-9935101-2-0, page 101)

== Playing career ==
=== County Cup Final appearances ===
Arthur Moore played as a forward in Hull Kingston Rovers' 10-22 defeat by Huddersfield in the 1911–12 Yorkshire Cup Final during the 1911–12 season at Belle Vue, Wakefield on Saturday 25 November 1911, in front of a crowd of 20,000.

=== International honours ===
Moore won a cap for England while at Hull Kingston Rovers, he played as a forward in 1913 against Wales.
