= Alf Mann (rugby league) =

GB & England international rugby league footballer

Personal information
- Full name: Alfred Mann

Playing information
- Position: Forward
Club
Years	Team	Pld	T	G	FG	P
1904–09	Bradford Northern
1909–18	Hull Kingston Rovers	224	53	4	0	167
1918–22	Bradford Northern
	Total	224	53	4	0	167
Representative
Years	Team	Pld	T	G	FG	P
1908–09	England	4	3	0	0	9
1908–09	Great Britain	2	0	0	0	0

Alfred Mann was an English professional rugby league footballer who played in the 1900s, 1910s and 1920s. He played at representative level for Great Britain and England, and at club level for Bradford Northern (two spells), and Hull Kingston Rovers, as a forward.

== Club career ==
Mann made his debut for Bradford F.C. in 1904. He played for the club in their 1906 Yorkshire Cup final victory over Hull Kingston Rovers. Following the club's decision to discontinue its rugby team, he joined the newly formed Bradford Northern club in 1907.

He was signed by Hull Kingston Rovers in June 1909. During the previous year, Rovers had agreed to sign Mann, and his Bradford teammate Tommy Surman, for a combined fee of £120, but the transfer was blocked by the Northern Union, as Bradford's club secretary had agreed to the deal without the board's knowledge.

== International honours ==
Arthur Mann won caps for England while at Bradford Northern in 1908 against Wales, in 1909 against Australia (3 matches), and won caps for Great Britain while at Bradford Northern in 1908-09 against Australia (2 matches), becoming Bradford Northern's first Test match player.
