= Harry Feather =

England international rugby league footballer

Harry (J.?) Feather
Personal information
- Full name: Harry (J.?) Feather
- Born: unknown
- Died: unknown

Playing information
- Position: Forward
Club
Years	Team	Pld	T	G	FG	P
1898–1907	Bradford FC	186	7	3		27
1907–13	Bradford Northern	133	11	10		53
	Total	319	18	13	0	80
Representative
Years	Team	Pld	T	G	FG	P
1901–02	Yorkshire	3	1	0	0	3
1905	England	1	0	0	0	0

Harry Feather (birth unknown – death unknown) was an English professional rugby league footballer who played in the 1900s and 1910s. He played at representative level for England, and at club level for Bradford FC and Bradford Northern, as a forward. Prior to Tuesday 27 August 1895, Bradford FC was a rugby union club, it then became a rugby league club, and since 1907 it has been the association football (soccer) club Bradford Park Avenue.

== Playing career ==
=== Club career ===
Feather debuted for Bradford FC in October 1898.

Feather was a non-playing interchange/substitute to travel in Bradford FC's 5-0 victory over Salford in the Championship tiebreaker during the 1903–04 season at Thrum Hall, Hanson Lane, Halifax on Thursday 28 April 1904, in front of a crowd of 12,000.

Feather played as a forward and was sent-off for fighting with Salford's Silas Warwick, in Bradford FC's 5-0 victory over Salford in the 1906 Challenge Cup Final during the 1905–06 season at Headingley, Leeds, on Saturday 28 April 1906, in front of a crowd of 15,834.

A joint benefit match was arranged by Bradford for Feather and team mate Jack Haley on New Years Day 1924 against Keighley.

=== International honours ===
Feather won a cap for England while at Bradford FC in 1905 against Other Nationalities.

== Note ==
Harry Feather's first initial is stated as J. on rugbyleagueproject.org.
