= Thomas Surman =

England international rugby league footballer

Personal information
- Full name: John Thomas Surman
- Born: second ¼ 1883 Bradford district, England
- Died: January 1948 Bradford, England

Playing information
- Position: Stand-off, Scrum-half
Club
Years	Team	Pld	T	G	FG	P
1902–07	Bradford FC	120	23	35	0	139
1907–09	Bradford Northern
1909–13	Hull Kingston Rovers	76	27	0	0	81
1914–21	Bradford Northern
	Total	196	50	35	0	220
Representative
Years	Team	Pld	T	G	FG	P
1904–11	Yorkshire	7	0	4	0	8
1906	England	1	0	0	0	0

John Thomas Surman (second ¼ 1883 – January 1948) was an English professional rugby league footballer who played in the 1900s and 1910s. He played at representative level for England and Yorkshire, and at club level for Bradford FC, Bradford Northern and Hull Kingston Rovers, as a stand-off or scrum-half. Prior to Tuesday 27 August 1895, Bradford F.C. was a rugby union club, it then became a rugby league club, and since 1907 it has been the association football (soccer) club Bradford Park Avenue.

== Background ==
Thomas Surman's birth was registered in Bradford district, West Riding of Yorkshire, England, and his death aged 64 was registered in Bradford district, West Riding of Yorkshire, England.

== Playing career ==
Baines Cigarette card featuring Thomas Surman

=== Bradford ===
Surman played scrum-half in Bradford FC's 5-0 victory over Salford in the Championship tiebreaker during the 1903–04 season at Thrum Hall, Hanson Lane, Halifax on Thursday 28 April 1904, in front of a crowd of 12,000.

Surman was a reserve to travel, with George Marsden playing stand-off and S. Brear playing scrum-half, in Bradford FC's 5-0 victory over Salford in the 1906 Challenge Cup Final during the 1905-06 season at Headingley, Leeds, in front of a crowd of 15,834.

=== Hull Kingston Rovers ===
Surman played scrum-half in Hull Kingston Rovers' 10-22 defeat by Huddersfield in the 1911–12 Yorkshire Cup Final during the 1911–12 season at Belle Vue, Wakefield on Saturday 25 November 1911, in front of a crowd of 20,000.

=== Representative honours ===
Surman won a cap for England while at Bradford F.C., he played stand-off against Other Nationalities during 1906.

Surman won cap(s) for Yorkshire while at Bradford FC, including against New Zealand at Belle Vue, Wakefield on Wednesday 18 December 1907.

== Post-playing ==
After ending his playing career, Surman returned to Bradford where he ran a grocery. He died in January 1948.
