= Spotswood High School =

Spotswood High School may refer to:

- Spotswood High School (New Jersey), Spotswood, New Jersey
- Spotswood High School (Virginia), Penn Laird, Virginia
