= Ervine Mosby =

English international rugby league footballer

Personal information
- Full name: Ervine Pyrah Mosby
- Born: October 1877 Normanton, England
- Died: 21 October 1916 (aged 38) Bradford, England

Playing information
- Height: 5 ft 10 in (178 cm)
- Weight: 12 st (168 lb; 76 kg)
- Position: Centre
Club
Years	Team	Pld	T	G	FG	P
1901–11	Bradford R.F.C.	193	21	145		353
Representative
Years	Team	Pld	T	G	FG	P
1903–04	Yorkshire	6	3	6	0	21
1905	England	1	1	0	0	3

Ervine Pyrah Mosby (October 1877 – October 1916), also referred to as Irving Mosby, was an English professional rugby league footballer who played between 1901 and 1911. He played at representative level for Yorkshire and England, and at club level for Bradford R.F.C. He had previously played rugby union for Leicester.

== Background ==
Mosby was born in Normanton, West Riding of Yorkshire, England, and he died aged 38 in Bradford, West Riding of Yorkshire, England.

== Playing career ==
=== International honours ===
Mosby won a cap for England while at Bradford FC in 1905 against Other Nationalities.

=== Championship final appearances ===
Mosby played right-centre and scored a goal in Bradford FC's 5-0 victory over Salford in the Championship tiebreaker during the 1903–04 season at Thrum Hall, Halifax on Thursday 28 April 1904, in front of a crowd of 12,000.

=== County Cup Final appearances ===
Mosby played in Bradford FC's 8-5 victory over Hull Kingston Rovers in the 1906 Yorkshire Cup Final at Belle Vue, Wakefield on Saturday 1 December 1906.
