= Tommy Rostron =

England international rugby league footballer

Personal information
- Full name: Thomas Rostron

Playing information
- Position: Loose forward
Club
Years	Team	Pld	T	G	FG	P
1943–49	Oldham	64	6	0	0	18
Representative
Years	Team	Pld	T	G	FG	P
1945	England	1	0	0	0	0
1945	Lancashire	1	0	0	0	0

Thomas Rostron (birth year unknown) is an English former professional rugby league footballer who played in the 1940s. He played at representative level for England, and at club level for Oldham, as a loose forward.

== International honours ==
Tommy Rostron won a cap for England while at Oldham in 1945 against Wales.
