= Robert Poole (rugby) =

England dual-code rugby international player

Personal information
- Full name: Robert Watkin Poole
- Born: 4 November 1874 Hartlepool, England
- Died: 26 December 1933 (aged 59) Southampton, England

Playing information

Rugby union
Club
Years	Team	Pld	T	G	FG	P
1894–98	Hartlepool Rovers
Representative
Years	Team	Pld	T	G	FG	P
1896	England	1	0	0	0	0

Rugby league
- Position: Fullback
Club
Years	Team	Pld	T	G	FG	P
1901–06	Broughton Rangers
Representative
Years	Team	Pld	T	G	FG	P
1904–06	Lancashire	6	0	0	0	0
1905	England	1	0	0	0	0

Robert Watkin Poole (4 November 1874 – 26 December 1933) was an English rugby union and rugby league footballer who played in the 1900s. He played at representative level for England, and at club level for Broughton Rangers.

== Playing career ==
=== Rugby union ===
Born in Hartlepool, Poole played rugby union for Hartlepool Old Boys and Hartlepool Rovers. He played at county level for Durham, and also represented England once in 1896.

=== Rugby league ===
In 1901, Poole switched codes to rugby league and joined Broughton Rangers.

Poole won a cap for England while at Broughton Rangers in 1905 against Other Nationalities.
