= Diccon Edwards =

Wales international rugby league & union footballer

- Born: Diccon Edwards; 13 March 1973 (age 53) London, England
- Height: 5 ft 8 in (1.73 m)
- Weight: 13 st 4 lb (84 kg)
- University: Loughborough University
- Occupation: Rugby coach

Rugby union career
- Position: Centre
Amateur team(s)
Years	Team	Apps	(Points)
–	Selby		
–	Wakefield		
–	Leicester Tigers		
–	Newport RFC		
–	Leeds Carnegie		
–	Wakefield		
Coaching career
- Years: Team
- –: Sheffield
- –: Selby
- –: Leeds Carnegie
- Rugby league career

Playing information
- Position: Wing
Club
Years	Team	Pld	T	G	FG	P
1996–97	Castleford Tigers
Representative
Years	Team	Pld	T	G	FG	P
1996	Wales	1				0

Diccon Edwards (born 13 March 1973) is an English former rugby union and professional rugby league footballer who played in the 1990s. He played representative level rugby league (RL) for Wales. He is currently coach of Leeds Carnegie Academy and Otley RUFC.

He played club rugby union for Selby RUFC, Wakefield, Leicester Tigers, Newport RFC, Leeds Carnegie and Selby and rugby league for Castleford.

He was educated at Pocklington School and played for England Under-16s and Under-18s. He also played for England Colts and Under-21 levels and made his Yorkshire début during the 1992/93 season. He also toured South Africa with the North in 1995. and played for the North against Queensland.

He played once for the Wales (RL), qualifying through his Welsh father.

He retired through a shoulder and neck problem.
