= Jason Roach (rugby league) =

Scotland international rugby league footballer

Personal information
- Full name: Jason Roach
- Born: 2 May 1971 (age 55) St Helens, Lancashire, England

Playing information
- Height: 6 ft 2 in (1.88 m)
- Position: Fullback, Wing
Club
Years	Team	Pld	T	G	FG	P
1989–93	St Helens	6	0	0	0	8
1994	London Broncos	11	5	0	0	20
1995–96	Swinton	45	43	3	0	178
1997	Castleford Tigers	12	6	0	0	24
1998–99	Warrington Wolves	43	21	0	0	84
2000	Swinton Lions	1	0	0	0	0
2001	Whitehaven	6	2	0	0	8
2002–04	Swinton Lions	62	33	0	0	132
2005	Barrow Raiders	23	5	0	0	20
2006	Blackpool Panthers	10	1	0	0	4
	Total	219	116	3	0	478
Representative
Years	Team	Pld	T	G	FG	P
1998–04	Scotland	8	4	0	0	16

Jason Roach (born 2 May 1971), also known by the nicknames of "Roachy", or "Rooster", is a former Scotland international rugby league footballer who played as a fullback or wing in the 1980s, 1990s and 2000s. He played at representative level for Scotland, and at club level for St Helens, Swinton Lions (three spells), Castleford Tigers, Warrington Wolves, London Broncos, Barrow Raiders and the Blackpool Panthers.

== Background ==
Jason Roach was born in St Helens, Lancashire, England.

== International honours ==
Jason Roach won 8 caps for Scotland in 1998–2004 while at Warrington and Swinton. Scoring two tries on his début in Paris.
