= Melbourne Tierney =

Wales international rugby league footballer

Mel Tierney
Personal information
- Full name: Melbourne Tierney
- Born: 3 December 1923 Tumble, Wales
- Died: 27 November 2014 (aged 90) Stockport, England

Playing information

Rugby union
- Position: Centre
Club
Years	Team	Pld	T	G	FG	P
1945–46	Tumble RFC

Rugby league
- Position: Centre
Club
Years	Team	Pld	T	G	FG	P
1946–55	Belle Vue Rangers	311
1955–≥55	Rochdale Hornets
	Total	311	0	0	0	0
Representative
Years	Team	Pld	T	G	FG	P
1953	Wales	1

Melbourne Tierney (3 December 1923 – 27 November 2014) was a Welsh professional rugby league footballer who played in the 1940s and 1950s. Starting with his home village club Tumble RFC after the second world war, Tierney turned professional after the 1946 West Wales Cup final against Amman United RFC at Stradey Park, Llanelli. He played at representative level for Wales, and at club level for Belle Vue Rangers and Rochdale Hornets, as a second-row.

== Playing career ==
=== International honours ===
Tierney won a cap for Wales while at Belle Vue Rangers in 1953.

=== County Cup Final appearances ===
He played at centre in Belle Vue Rangers' 7-10 defeat by Wigan in the 1947 Lancashire Cup Final during the 1947–48 season at Wilderspool Stadium, Warrington on Saturday 1 November 1947.

=== Club records ===
Tierney holds Belle Vue Rangers' most consecutive appearances record, with 137-appearances from Saturday 23 September 1950 to Saturday 5 December 1953.

== Personal life and death ==
Tierney was born in Tumble, Carmarthenshire, Wales on 3 December 1923. Tierney later worked as an engineer. He died from dementia in Stockport, Greater Manchester on 27 November 2014, at the age of 90.
