= Ernie Thompson (rugby league) =

England international rugby league footballer

Personal information
- Full name: Ernest Thompson
- Born: unknown
- Died: unknown

Playing information
- Position: Scrum-half
Club
Years	Team	Pld	T	G	FG	P
1927–32	Huddersfield
1932–34	Wakefield Trinity	34	12	3	0	42
1934–≥36	Broughton Rangers
	Total	34	12	3	0	42
Representative
Years	Team	Pld	T	G	FG	P
	Yorkshire
1936	England	1	0	0	0	0

Ernest "Ernie" Thompson (birth unknown – death unknown) was an English professional rugby league footballer who played in the 1930s. He played at representative level for England and Yorkshire, and at club level for Wakefield Trinity, and Broughton Rangers, as a scrum-half.

== Playing career ==
=== Club career ===
Thompson started his rugby league career with Huddersfield, helping the club win the 1931–32 Yorkshire Cup.

Thompson transferred to Wakefield Trinity in December 1932. He played scrum-half in Wakefield Trinity's 6-17 defeat by Australia in the 1933–34 Kangaroo tour of Great Britain match during the 1933–34 season at Belle Vue, Wakefield on Saturday 28 October 1933. In January 1934, he was transferred to Broughton Rangers.

=== Representative honours ===
Ernie Thompson won a cap for England while at Broughton Rangers in the 2-3 defeat by Wales at Taff Vale Park, Pontypridd on Saturday 7 November 1936.

Ernie Thompson won cap(s) for Yorkshire while at Wakefield Trinity.

== Personal life ==
Ernie Thompson's brother, Arthur Thompson, also played rugby league for Huddersfield and Wakefield Trinity. He was the uncle of the rugby league referee, Billy Thompson.

Thompson emigrated to Australia in the early 1950s.
