= Tony Smith (rugby league, born 1970) =

English RL coach and former GB & England international rugby league footballer

Personal information
- Full name: Antony Smith
- Born: 16 July 1970 (age 56) Castleford, England

Playing information
- Weight: 13 st 5 lb (85 kg)
- Position: Stand-off, Scrum-half, Hooker
Club
Years	Team	Pld	T	G	FG	P
1988–97	Castleford Tigers	195	90	0	0	360
1997–00	Wigan Warriors	85	49	0	0	196
2001–03	Hull FC	48	26	0	0	104
	Total	328	165	0	0	660
Representative
Years	Team	Pld	T	G	FG	P
1995–00	Yorkshire	1	1	0	0	4
1995–00	England	9	5	0	0	20
1996–98	Great Britain	5	1	0	1	5

Coaching information
Club
Years	Team	Gms	W	D	L	W%
2005–06	Wakefield Trinity Wildcats	25	7	0	18	28

Antony Smith (born 16 July 1970), also known by the nickname "Casper", is an English former professional rugby league footballer who played in the 1980s, 1990s and 2000s, and coached in the 2000s. He played at representative level for Great Britain, England and Yorkshire, and at club level for the Castleford Tigers, Wigan Warriors and Hull FC, as a stand-off, scrum-half or hooker, and coached at club level for the Wakefield Trinity Wildcats.

== Playing career ==
While at Wigan Smith won caps for England while at Castleford in the 1995 Rugby League World Cup against France (sub), Fiji, South Africa (sub), Wales, and Australia. Smith was selected to play for England in the 1995 World Cup Final at stand-off but Australia won the match and retained the Cup.

He again played for England in the 2000 Rugby League World Cup against Australia, Fiji, Ireland (sub), and New Zealand, and won caps for Great Britain while at Castleford in 1996 against Papua New Guinea (sub), and Fiji (sub), and while at Wigan in 1998 against New Zealand (3 matches).

Tony Smith was a substitute (replacing stand-off Grant Anderson at half-time (40-minutes)) in Castleford's 12–28 defeat by Wigan in the 1992 Challenge Cup Final during the 1991–92 season at Wembley Stadium, London on Saturday 2 May 1992, in front of a crowd of 77,386.

Tony Smith played, and scored a try in Castleford's 28–6 victory over Bradford Northern in the 1991 Yorkshire Cup Final during the 1991–92 season at Elland Road, Leeds on Sunday 20 October 1991.

Tony Smith played for Wigan at scrum-half in their 1998 Super League Grand Final victory over Leeds Rhinos. He played for the Wigan Warriors at stand-off, scoring a try in their 2000 Super League Grand Final loss against St. Helens.

== Coaching career ==
Tony Smith is a former coach of Super League club Wakefield Trinity Wildcats. He was appointed in August 2005 after a successful spell as caretaker coach following the sacking of Australian Shane McNally. However, with the Wakefield Trinity Wildcats facing relegation, he was sacked in July 2006 and replaced a few days later by John Kear. He was subsequently Assistant Coach at Featherstone Rovers under head coach David Hobbs.
