= Frank Spottiswoode =

England international rugby league footballer

Personal information
- Full name: Frank Spottiswoode
- Born: unknown Cumberland, England
- Died: unknown

Playing information
- Position: Wing
Club
Years	Team	Pld	T	G	FG	P
1901–05	Oldham	112	45			135
Representative
Years	Team	Pld	T	G	FG	P
1903–08	Cumberland	3	1	0	0	3
1904	England	1	0	0	0	0

Frank Spottiswoode (birth unknown — death unknown) was an English professional rugby league footballer who played in the 1900s. He played at representative level for England, and at club level for Oldham, as a wing.

== Playing career ==
=== Championship appearances ===
Spottiswoode played in Oldham's victory in the Championship during the 1904–05 season.

=== International honours ===
Spottiswoode won a cap for England in the 3-9 defeat by Other Nationalities at Central Park, Wigan on 5 April 1904, in the first ever international rugby league match.
