= Billy Bentham =

GB & England international rugby league footballer

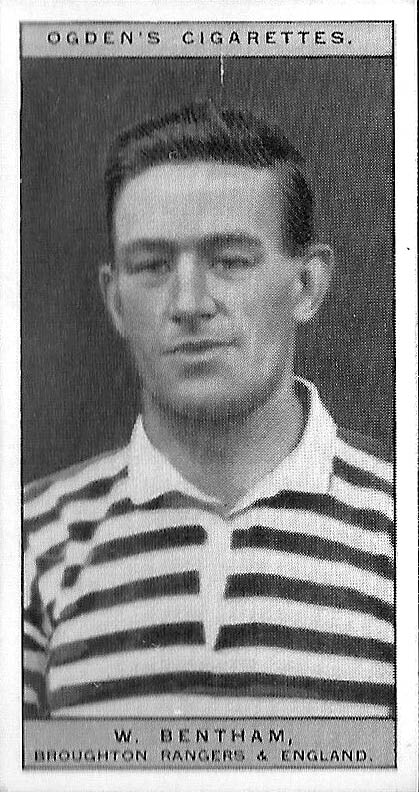

Personal information
- Full name: William Bentham
- Born: c. 1898
- Died: 7 September 1962 (aged 64)

Playing information
- Position: Wing
Club
Years	Team	Pld	T	G	FG	P
1919–29	Broughton Rangers	285	112
Representative
Years	Team	Pld	T	G	FG	P
1920–24	Lancashire
1922–26	England	2	1	0	0	3
1924	Great Britain	2	1	0	0	3

William Bentham (c. 1898 – 7 September 1962) was an English professional rugby league footballer who played in the 1910s and 1920s. He played at representative level for Great Britain, England and Lancashire, and at club level for Broughton Rangers, as a wing.

Billy Bentham won caps for England while at Broughton Rangers in 1922 against Wales, in 1926 against Wales, and won two caps for Great Britain during the 1924 Lions tour, both against New Zealand. He was the Broughton club's sole contribution to the tour's squad.
