= Richard Gay (rugby league) =

England international rugby league footballer

Personal information
- Full name: Richard Gay
- Born: 9 March 1969 (age 56) Kingston upon Hull, England

Playing information
- Position: Fullback, Wing
Club
Years	Team	Pld	T	G	FG	P
1989–96	Hull FC	183	65	0	0	260
1993	St. George Dragons	1	0	0	0	0
1996–02	Castleford Tigers	129	43	0	0	172
	Total	313	108	0	0	432
Representative
Years	Team	Pld	T	G	FG	P
1995	England	2	1	0	0	4

Richard Gay (born 9 March 1969) is an English former professional rugby league footballer who played in the 1980s, 1990s and 2000s. He played at representative level for England, and at club level for Hull FC, the St. George Dragons and the Castleford Tigers, as a fullback or wing.

== Background ==
Richard Gay was born in Kingston upon Hull, East Riding of Yorkshire, England, he has worked as a Physical education teacher, he has worked as a supply teacher, he has worked at Sydney Smith School (closed since 31 August 2014), First Lane, Anlaby, Kingston upon Hull. and as of 2014 he runs his own business named Waterworld that provides swimming lessons to children that is run from a purpose-built pool at his house.

== Playing career ==
=== Hull ===
Gay played fullback and scored a try in Hull FC's 14-4 victory over Widnes in the Premiership Final during the 1990–91 season at Old Trafford, Manchester on Sunday 12 May 1991.

=== Castleford ===
Gay was transferred from Hull F.C. to Castleford Tigers in January 1996 for a fee of around £87,500. He ended his playing career on medical advice in 2002 after being diagnosed with a benign brain tumour.

=== International honours ===
Richard Gay won caps for England while at Hull in 1995 against Wales, and France.
