= Nathan Sykes (rugby league) =

England international rugby league footballer

Personal information
- Born: 8 September 1974 (age 51)

Playing information
- Position: Prop, Second-row
Club
Years	Team	Pld	T	G	FG	P
1991–04	Castleford Tigers	291	8	0	0	32
2005	Featherstone Rovers	20	1	0	0	4
	Total	311	9	0	0	36
Representative
Years	Team	Pld	T	G	FG	P
1993–94	Great Britain U21	2	0	0	0	0
1999–06	England	2	0	0	0	0
2002	Yorkshire	1	0	0	0	0

Nathan Sykes (born 8 September 1974) is an English former professional rugby league footballer who played in the 1990s and 2000s. He played at representative level for England and Yorkshire, and at club level for Moldgreen ARLFC, Castleford Tigers and Featherstone Rovers (captain), as a prop or second-row.

== Playing career ==
=== Club career ===
Sykes played for Moldgreen ARLFC before playing professionally for the Castleford Tigers in the Super League. Sykes made his debut for Castleford Tigers in 1991, and then played for Castleford for fourteen seasons. Nathan Sykes made his debut for Featherstone Rovers on Sunday 13 February 2005.

=== Representative career ===
Sykes won caps for England, playing against France in 1999, and against Wales in 2001. He represented Yorkshire whilst at Castleford Tigers playing as an interchange/substitute, in the 18–22 defeat by Lancashire at Central Park, Wigan on Friday 14 June 2002.
