= Glyn Jones (rugby league) =

Wales international rugby league & union footballer

Personal information
- Full name: Glyn Jones
- Born: Wales
- Died: unknown

Playing information

Rugby union
Club
Years	Team	Pld	T	G	FG	P
≤1933–≤33	Swansea RFC

Rugby league
- Position: Hooker
Club
Years	Team	Pld	T	G	FG	P
1933–42	Broughton Rangers	291
1942–45	Halifax
1944–45	→ Hull F.C. (guest)
1945–51	Belle Vue Rangers	-
	Total	291	0	0	0	0
Representative
Years	Team	Pld	T	G	FG	P
1946	Wales	1

Glyn Jones (birth unknown – death unknown) was a Welsh rugby union and professional rugby league footballer who played in the 1930s, 1940s and 1950s. (Note: Not to be confused with the rugby league footballer who played in the 1960s and 1970s for Castleford) He played club level rugby union (RU) for Swansea RFC, and representative level rugby league (RL) for Wales, and at club level for Hull FC, Broughton Rangers and Belle Vue Rangers (as Broughton Rangers renamed following their move from Broughton, Salford to Belle Vue, Manchester). as a hooker.

== Club career ==
A rugby union player with Swansea RFC, Jones switched codes to rugby league in September 1933, joining Broughton Rangers.

During the Second World War, he played for Halifax, and also guested for Hull F.C.

== International honours ==
Glyn Jones played hooker in Wales' 7–19 defeat by France at Stade Chaban-Delmas, Bordeaux on Sunday 24 March 1946.
