= Bob Wilson (rugby league) =

England international rugby league footballer

Personal information
- Full name: Robert James Wilson
- Born: 2 January 1879; Carnforth, England
- Died: 6 February 1916 (aged 37); Prestwich, England

Playing information
Club
Years	Team	Pld	T	G	FG	P
1900–09	Broughton Rangers	256	141
Representative
Years	Team	Pld	T	G	FG	P
1901–07	Lancashire	16	13	0	0	39
1905	England	1	0	0	0	0

Robert James Wilson (2 January 1879 – 6 February 1916) was an English professional rugby league footballer who played in the 1900s. He played at representative level for England and Lancashire, and at club level for Broughton Rangers.

== Background ==
Bob Wilson was born in Carnforth, Lancashire. He died in February 1916, aged 37.

== Playing career ==
=== Club career ===
Wilson was the top try scorer in the 1901–02 season.

=== Representative honours ===
Wilson won a cap for England while at Broughton Rangers in 1905 against Other Nationalities. Wilson also won caps for Lancashire while at Broughton Rangers.
