= Lee Harland =

England international rugby league footballer (1973–2026)

Personal information
- Full name: Lee Harland
- Born: 4 September 1973
- Died: 25 October 2026 (aged 53)

Playing information
- Position: Second-row, Loose forward
Club
| Years | Team | Pld | T | G | FG | P |
|---|---|---|---|---|---|---|
| 1993 | Leeds | 8 | 0 | 0 | 0 | 0 |
| 1993–95 | Halifax | 22 | 2 | 0 | 0 | 8 |
| 1995–04 | Castleford Tigers | 227 | 26 | 0 | 0 | 104 |
| 2005 | Doncaster | 24 | 5 | 0 | 0 | 20 |
| 2006 | Halifax | 10 | 0 | 0 | 0 | 0 |
| 2006 | Batley Bulldogs | 4 | 0 | 0 | 0 | 0 |
| | Total | 295 | 33 | 0 | 0 | 132 |
Representative
| Years | Team | Pld | T | G | FG | P |
| 1993–94 | Great Britain U21 | 3 | 0 | 0 | 0 | 0 |
| 1999 | England | 2 | 0 | 0 | 0 | 0 |
| 2002–03 | Yorkshire | 2 | 0 | 0 | 0 | 0 |

Lee Harland (4 September 1973 – 25 October 2026) was an English professional rugby league footballer who played in the 1990s and 2000s. He played at international level for England and Great Britain U21, as well as playing for Yorkshire and at club level for Leeds, Halifax, Castleford Tigers, Doncaster and Batley Bulldogs, as a second-row, or loose forward.

== Playing career ==
=== Club career ===
In February 1995, Harland was transferred from Halifax to Castleford Tigers in exchange for Martin Ketteridge.

=== International honours ===
Harland won caps for Great Britain under-21's against New Zealand and France.

He won two caps for England while at Castleford Tigers in 1999 against France.

Harland won caps for Yorkshire while at Castleford Tigers as a substitute in the 18-22 defeat by Lancashire at Wigan Warriors' stadium on 14 June 2002, and at second-row in the 56-6 victory over Lancashire at Bradford Bulls' stadium on 2 July 2003.

== Death ==
Harland died on the evening of 25 October 2026, aged 53.
