= Grant Anderson (rugby league, born 1969) =

English rugby league footballer

Personal information
- Born: 21 February 1969 (age 57) unknown

Playing information
- Position: Centre
Club
Years	Team	Pld	T	G	FG	P
1986–94	Castleford	211	82	0	1	317
1994–96	Halifax	15	2	0	0	8
1996–97	Castleford Tigers	23	3	0	0	12
1998	Keighley Cougars	5	1	0	0	4
	Total	254	88	0	1	341
Representative
Years	Team	Pld	T	G	FG	P
1989–90	Great Britain U-21	4

Grant Anderson (born 21 February 1969) is a former professional rugby league footballer who played in the 1980s and 1990s. He played at club level for Castleford (two spells), and Halifax.

== Playing career ==
=== Club career ===
Anderson made his début for Castleford in the 44-8 victory over Widnes on 18 March 1987, he signed for Castleford for a second-time from Halifax on Monday 26 February 1996.

Anderson played stand-off in Castleford's 12-33 defeat by Leeds in the 1988 Yorkshire Cup Final during the 1988–89 season at Headingley, Leeds on Sunday 16 October 1988, and played at centre in the 11-8 victory over Wakefield Trinity in the 1990 Yorkshire Cup Final during the 1990–91 season at Elland Road, Leeds on Sunday 23 September 1990.

Anderson played stand-off in Castleford's 12-28 defeat by Wigan in the 1992 Challenge Cup Final during the 1991–92 season at Wembley Stadium, London on Saturday 2 May 1992, in front of a crowd of 77,386.

Anderson played at centre and scored a try in Castleford Tigers' 33-2 victory over Wigan in the 1993–94 Regal Trophy Final during the 1993–94 season at Headingley, Leeds on Saturday 22 January 1994.

Anderson finished his playing career with Keighley Cougars in 1998, after which he retired due to injuries, aged 29. He remained at Keighley as an assistant coach to Lee Crooks. He also worked alongside Crooks at York Wasps.

=== Representative career ===
Anderson made four appearances for Great Britain under-21s between 1989 and 1990.
