= Richard Goddard (rugby league) =

England international rugby league footballer

Personal information
- Full name: Richard Goddard
- Born: 28 April 1974 (age 52)

Playing information
- Position: Centre
Club
Years	Team	Pld	T	G	FG	P
1990–94	Wakefield Trinity
1994–97	Castleford Tigers	60	16	36	0	136
1998	Hunslet
1999	York Wasps
2000–04	Sheffield Eagles
	Total	60	16	36	0	136
Representative
Years	Team	Pld	T	G	FG	P
1995	England	1	0	0	0	0

Richard Goddard (born 28 April 1974) is an English former professional rugby league footballer who played in the 1990s and 2000s. He played at representative level for England, and at club level for Wakefield Trinity, Castleford Tigers, York Wasps and Sheffield Eagles, as a centre.

== Playing career ==
=== Wakefield Trinity ===
Goddard is the youngest player to make his 1990 début for Wakefield Trinity, aged 16 years, 3 months and 29 days.

Goddard played as a substitute in Wakefield Trinity's 29–16 victory over Sheffield Eagles in the 1992–93 Yorkshire Cup Final during the 1992–93 season at Elland Road, Leeds on Sunday 18 October 1992.

=== Castleford ===
In 1994, Goddard was signed by Castleford, with the transfer fee of £75,000 being set by a tribunal.

=== International honours ===
Goddard won a cap for England while at Castleford Tigers in 1995 against France. He was named in England's 40-man training squad in preparation for the 1995 Rugby League World Cup, but was not included in the final squad.
