= 1905–06 Challenge Cup =

Rugby league competition

- Duration: 6 rounds
- Highest attendance: 15,834
- Winners: Bradford
- Runners-up: Salford

The 1905–06 Challenge Cup was the 10th staging of rugby league's oldest knockout competition, the Challenge Cup.

The final was contested by Bradford F.C. and Salford at Headingley, Leeds in front of a crowd of 15,834 on Saturday 28 April 1906. Bradford won the Cup in their first appearance in the final by a score of 5-0.

== Intermediate round ==
The intermediate, or qualifying, round matches were played on 17 February 1906.

Intermediate round fixtures
| Home | Score | Away |
|---|---|---|
| Barrow St.George's | 5–7 | Brookland |
| Brighouse Rangers | 2–0 | Huddersfield |
| Castleford | 6–21 | Keighley |
| Egerton | 6–3 | Widnes Rangers |
| Hull Newington | 0–21 | Pontefract |
| Leigh Shamrocks | 3–3 | Chadderton |
| Millom | 3–5 | Morecambe |
| Normanton | 8–4 | Bramley |
| Otley | 5–8 | Featherstone Rovers |
| Parton | 2–2 | Egremont |
| Rochdale Rangers | 0–8 | Rochdale Hornets |
| St Helens | 0–3 | Runcorn |
| Victoria Rangers | 8–0 | Hebden Bridge |
| York | 15–0 | New Blackpool |

=== Replays ===
The two replays were played on 24 February 1906.

Intermediate round replays
| Home | Score | Away |
|---|---|---|
| Chadderton | 0–4 | Leigh Shamrocks |
| Egremont | 10–0 | Parton |

== First round ==
First round fixtures
| Home | Score | Away |
|---|---|---|
| Batley | 6–5 | Warrington |
| Brighouse Rangers | 13–0 | Morecambe |
| Broughton Rangers | 14–5 | Barrow |
| Egerton | 9–0 | Leigh Shamrocks |
| Featherstone Rovers | 16–5 | Brookland |
| Halifax | 20–5 | Hunslet |
| Hull FC | 6–0 | Runcorn |
| Hull Kingston Rovers | 12–5 | Dewsbury |
| Keighley | 13–0 | Egremont |
| Leeds | 17–0 | Normanton |
| Pontefract | 0–12 | Oldham |
| Rochdale Hornets | 0–6 | Salford |
| Swinton | 2–4 | Leigh |
| Victoria Rangers | 0–0 | Widnes |
| Wakefield Trinity | 0-5 | Bradford |
| York | 5-4 | Wigan |

=== Replay ===
The replayed fixture was played on 7 March 1906.

First round replay
| Home | Score | Away |
|---|---|---|
| Widnes | 8–3 | Victoria Rangers |

== Second round ==
Second round fixtures were played on 17 March 1906.

Second round fixtures
| Home | Score | Away |
|---|---|---|
| Batley | 19–0 | York |
| Bradford | 15–0 | Leigh |
| Brighouse Rangers | 0–0 | Hull Kingston Rovers |
| Featherstone Rovers | 23–2 | Widnes |
| Hull FC | 0–5 | Keighley |
| Leeds | 0–2 | Broughton Rangers |
| Oldham | 2–5 | Halifax |
| Salford | 38–5 | Egerton |

=== Replay ===
Second round replay
| Home | Score | Away |
|---|---|---|
| Hull Kingston Rovers | 29–0 | Brighouse Rangers |

== Third round ==
The third round fixtures were played on 31 March 1906.

Third round fixtures
| Home | Score | Away |
|---|---|---|
| Batley | 15–0 | Hull Kingston Rovers |
| Bradford | 0–0 | Halifax |
| Keighley | 3–0 | Featherstone Rovers |
| Salford | 2–2 | Broughton Rangers |

=== Replays ===
The two drawn matches were replayed the following week. Halifax played Bradford on 3 April with Broughton Rangers v Salford played on 4 April.

Third round replays
| Home | Score | Away |
|---|---|---|
| Halifax | 2–8 | Bradford |
| Broughton Rangers | 3–3 | Salford |

The Broughton v Salford tie required a second replay to decide the fixture and this was played at Wigan on 6 April.

Third round second replay
| Home | Score | Away |
|---|---|---|
| Salford | 5–3 | Broughton Rangers |

== Semi-finals ==
The semi-finals were played at neutral venues on 14 April 1906.

Second round fixtures
| First team | Score | Second team | Venue |
|---|---|---|---|
| Bradford | 11–3 | Batley | Huddersfield |
| Salford | 6–3 | Keighley | Warrington |

== Final ==
28 April 1906

| Bradford | 5–0 | Salford |
|---|---|---|
| | Report |

Headingley, Leeds
Attendance: 15,834
Referee: W McCutcheon
