= Andrew Hogg (rugby league) =

GB & England international rugby league footballer

Personal information
- Born: 1879; Swinton, Berwickshire, Scotland
- Died: 4 June 1965 (aged 85–86); Roose, England

Playing information
- Position: Wing
Club
Years	Team	Pld	T	G	FG	P
1899–10	Broughton Rangers	339	186			602
1910–11	Wigan	7	1	4		11
	Barrow
	Total	346	187	4	0	613
Representative
Years	Team	Pld	T	G	FG	P
1902–08	Lancashire	15	15	1	0	47
1906	Other Nationalities	1	0	0	0	0
1908	England	2	0	0	0	0
1908	Great Britain	1	0	0	0	0

Andrew "Andy" Hogg (1879 – 4 June 1965) was a Scottish professional rugby league footballer who played in the 1890s, 1900s and 1910s. He played at representative level for Great Britain, England, Other Nationalities and Lancashire, and at club level for Broughton Rangers, as a wing.

Hogg is one of only two people born in Scotland to have played for the England national rugby league team, the other being George Fairbairn.

== Career ==
Hogg began playing rugby for Hawick RFC before moving to England to join Northern Union club Broughton Rangers. He appeared 339 times for the club between 1899 and 1910, scoring 186 tries.

Hogg was signed by Wigan at the start of the 1910–11 season, but made only seven appearances before moving to Barrow in February 1911.

Hogg won cap(s) for Other Nationalities while at Broughton Rangers against England, won caps for England while at Broughton Rangers in 1908 against Wales, and New Zealand, and won a cap for Great Britain while at Broughton Rangers in 1908 against New Zealand.
