= 1908–09 Yorkshire Cup =

- Structure: Regional knockout championship
- Teams: 13
- Winners: Halifax
- Runners-up: Hunslet

The 1908–09 Yorkshire Cup was the fourth occasion on which the Yorkshire Cup competition, a rugby league tournament, was held. The final was a repeat of the previous year's final between holder's Hunslet and the runner-up Halifax and the third meeting between the two club's in the County Cup final, as well as 1907–08, the two had met in the 1905–06 final. The match was won by Halifax who won 9–5, played at Belle Vue, in the Wakefield. The attendance was 13,000 and receipts were £356.

== First round ==
The draw for the first round was made at the Yorkshire committee meeting on 16 July 1908. With 13 teams entered into the competition, the first round comprised five ties filled by the first ten teams drawn. The three teams not drawn were given a bye to the second round. The teams with a bye were Bramley, Dewsbury and Hull. All five ties were played on 10 October 1908.

Yorkshire Cup first round
Home	Score	Away	Venue
Halifax	13–0	Leeds	Thrum Hall
Hull Kingston Rovers	13–19	Batley	Craven Street
Keighley	6–14	Hunslet	Lawkholme Lane
Wakefield Trinity	0–17	Huddersfield	Belle Vue
York	8–2	Bradford Northern	Clarence Street

== Second round ==
The second round draw was made on 12 October 1908. The ties were played on 24 October 1908.

Yorkshire Cup second round
Home	Score	Away	Venue
Dewsbury	32–2	Bramley	Crown Flatt
Halifax	31–2	Hull	Thrum Hall
Huddersfield	8–13	Batley	Fartown
York	0–14	Hunslet	Clarence Street

== Semi-finals ==
The Yorkshire committee met on 29 October to conduct the draw for the semi-finals. The games were played on 14 November 1908.

Yorkshire Cup Semi-finals
Home	Score	Away	Venue
Halifax	9–0	Batley	Thrum Hall
Hunslet	10–2	Dewsbury	Parkside

== Final ==
Wakefield Trinity's Belle Vue was chosen as the venue for the final.

Halifax dominated the first half, building up a 7–0 half-time lead through a Little drop goal, a try by Hilton and the resulting conversion kicked by Little. The second half saw Hunslet score a try through Randall which Goldthorpe converted but the final score went to Halifax as Little kicked a penalty.

Yorkshire Cup Final

28 November 1908

Halifax	9 – 5	Hunslet
Tries: Hilton; Goals: Little (2); Drop goals: Little	Report	Tries: Randall; Goals: Goldthorpe

Belle Vue, Wakefield
Attendance: 13,000
Referee: J. H. Smith

Yorkshire Cup Final teams
Halifax	Number	Hunslet
Fullback
Billy Little	1	Herbert Place
Threequarter backs
William Williams	2	Billy Batten
Joe Riley	3	William Hoyle
Ernest Ward	4	William Eagers
Dai Thomas	5	Fred Farrar
Halfbacks
Tommy Grey	6	Albert Goldthorpe
Jimmy Hilton	7	Fred Smith
Forwards
Fred Hammond	8	Harry Wilson
George Langhorn	9	Bill Jukes
Harry Morley	10	John Higson
Asa Robinson	11	Jack Randall
Fred Mallinson	12	Tom Walsh
Jack Swinbank	13	Charles Cappleman

== See also ==
- 1908–09 Northern Rugby Football Union season
- Rugby league county cups
