= 1907–08 Yorkshire Cup =

- Structure: Regional knockout championship
- Teams: 13
- Winners: Hunslet
- Runners-up: Halifax

The 1907 Yorkshire Cup was the third occasion on which the Yorkshire Cup competition was held. This year's final was a repeat of the first Yorkshire Cup final in which the same two clubs reached the same outcome. Hunslet won the trophy for the second time in three years by beating Halifax by the score of 17–0

The match was played at Headingley, Leeds, now in West Yorkshire. The attendance was 15,000 and receipts were £397

== Background ==
This season there were no junior/amateur clubs taking part, Pontefract folded part way through the last season, and last years cup winner and cup holder, Bradford, became turncoats to play with the round ball. As replacement, a new club Bradford Northern joined the league, resulting in an overall decrease of two from 1906, and giving a total of thirteen entrants.

This in turn resulted in three byes in the first round.

== Competition and results ==
=== Round 1 ===
Involved 5 matches (with three byes) and 13 clubs

Game No	Fixture date	Home team	Score	Away team	Venue	Ref
1	Sat 09 Nov 1907	Halifax	10–5	Batley	Thrum Hall	
2	Sat 09 Nov 1907	Hull	21–10	Keighley	Boulevard	
3	Sat 09 Nov 1907	Hunslet	50–0	Bramley	Parkside	
4	Sat 09 Nov 1907	Leeds	16–2	Hull Kingston Rovers	Headingley	
5	Sat 09 Nov 1907	York	14–15	Bradford Northern (Note: First Yorkshire Cup match played by newly formed club Bradford Northern who replaced Bradford who had converted to Soccer)	Clarence Street	
6	09 Nov 1907	Dewsbury	0	bye		
7	09 Nov 1907	Huddersfield	0	bye		
8	09 Nov 1907	Wakefield Trinity	0	bye		

=== Round 2 – quarterfinals ===
Involved 4 matches and 8 clubs

Game No	Fixture date	Home team	Score	Away team	Venue	Ref
1	Sat 23 Nov 1907	Dewsbury	3–15	Hull	Crown Flatt	
2	Sat 23 Nov 1907	Halifax	31–0	Bradford Northern	Thrum Hall	
3	Sat 23 Nov 1907	Huddersfield	2–2	Wakefield Trinity	Fartown	
4	Sat 23 Nov 1907	Hunslet	17–10	Leeds	Parkside	

=== Round 2 – Replays ===
Involved 1 match and 2 clubs

Game No	Fixture date	Home team	Score	Away team	Venue	Ref
R	Wed 27 Nov 1907	Wakefield Trinity	12–0	Huddersfield	Belle Vue	

=== Round 3 – semifinals ===
Involved 2 matches and 4 clubs

Game No	Fixture date	Home team	Score	Away team	Venue	Ref
1	Sat 07 Dec 1907	Hull	2–16	Halifax	Boulevard	
2	Sat 07 Dec 1907	Hunslet	10–0	Wakefield Trinity	Parkside	

=== Final ===
Fixture date	Home team	Score	Away team	Venue	Att	Rec	Ref
Saturday 21 December 1907	Hunslet	17–0	Halifax	Headingley (Note: Headingley is the home ground of Leeds RLFC with a capacity of 21,000. The record attendance was 40,175 for a league match between Leeds and Bradford Northern on 21 May 1947.)	15,000	397	

==== Teams and scorers ====
Hunslet	№	Halifax
	teams	
Herbert Place	1	Billy Little
Fred Farrar	2	Harry Morley
Charlie Ward	3	Fred Atkins
Billy Eagers	4	Eddie Ward
Billy Batten	5	Joe Riley
Albert Goldthorpe	6	Jimmy Hilton
Fred Smith	7	Tommy Grey
Harry Wilson	8	Joseph Brearley
Billy Brookes	9	Fred Hammond
Bill Jukes	10	Asa Robinson
Jack Randall	11	Fred Littlewood
Tom Walsh	12	George Langhorn
Walter Wray	13	L Sunderland
	Coach	
17	score	0
4	HT	0
	Scorers	
	Tries	
Billy Batten	T	
Fred Smith	T	
Albert Goldthorpe	T	
	T	
	T	
	Goals	
Charlie Ward	G	
Billy Eagers	G	
Albert Goldthorpe (2)	G	
	DG	
Referee		Billy Mc Cutcheon (Oldham)
Attendance: 15,000		

Scoring – Try = three (3) points – Goal = two (2) points – Drop goal = two (2) points

=== The road to success ===
First round
Bradford	68
Bramley	2
Wakefield Trinity	7
Leeds	19
Keighley	34
New Blackpool	2
York	8
Batley	7
Hull Kingston Rovers	44
Pontefract	0
Dewsbury	10
Huddersfield	27
Hull	3
Halifax	6
Hunslet
bye

Second round
Bradford	21
Leeds	5
Keighley	34
York	2
Hull Kingston Rovers	11
Huddersfield	3
Halifax	6
Hunslet	0

Semifinals
Bradford	6
Keighley	4
Hull Kingston Rovers	21
Halifax	0

Final
Bradford	8
Hull Kingston Rovers	5

== See also ==
- 1907–08 Northern Rugby Football Union season
- Rugby league county cups
