= List of British rugby league champions =

British rugby league champions (Tier 1)
- RFL Championship First Division (1895–1996); Super League (1996–present)
- Founded
- 1895–96
- Country
- England; Wales; France
- Editions completed
- 130
- Number of teams
- 14 (since 2026)
- Current champions
- Wakefield Trinity (3rd title)
- Most titles won
- Wigan (24 times)

The British men's rugby league champions are the winners of the highest league in British rugby league, which since 1996 is the Super League.

Note that due to the varying inclusion and non-inclusion of a playoff system within the competition, the team that finished first in the regular season have not always been champions. A list of first-place finishes can be found at List of British rugby league league leaders. Since 2003, these teams have been awarded a separate trophy – the League Leaders' Shield.

== History ==
Following the schism in 1895 that saw 22 Northern rugby clubs split from the Rugby Football Union and form the Northern Union, the 22 clubs were organised into one league. At the end of the 1895–96 season, Manningham were the first club to be crowned champions, finishing one point ahead of Halifax.

Following the success of the Northern Unions first season, more clubs defected from the Rugby Football Union to join the new league. After concerns around travel and costs were expressed, the decision was made that the competition should be split into two separate county championships: Lancashire and Yorkshire Leagues. County leagues were in place for the next five seasons until 1901–02 were the top seven sides from each league resigned to merge to form a new league. The only other times that there was no major championship was when there were outbrakes of war.

During the late 1980s and early 90s, Wigan became the only full-time professional club and dominated in every competition. A new Super League began to be mooted during the Super League war in Australia as a way for Rupert Murdoch to gain an upper hand in broadcasting supremacy with the Australian Rugby League. British clubs were approached to form a Super League with a cash incentive. Part of the deal was switching the sport to summer and the merger of some clubs, the latter not taking place due to huge protest from fans. All four Super League champions; St Helens, Wigan, Bradford and Leeds have all previously won the old First Division.

Only three clubs to have been crowned champions are not in existence today. During the reclassification of the Championship in 1901, the league was split into two divisions. Manningham were placed in the Second Division, finishing 10th out of 18 teams. At the end of the season a series of meetings was held about establishing a Football League club in the city. During an annual meeting the committee voted to switch to association football, becoming Bradford City. A similar situation occurred at Bradford FC in 1907 when a narrow majority of members voted to withdraw from the Northern Union in favour of association football, forming Bradford Park Avenue. Broughton Rangers struggled post war and folded in 1955 after a failed name change to Belle Vue Rangers in 1946.

Hunslet FC were the fourth former champions to fold after financial issues, player strikes and a stadium fire that led to the club selling the land to developers before being eventually wound up. Unlike the other three clubs which no longer exist, a phoenix club, New Hunslet, was formed in 1973 and still exists.

=== Method of determining champion ===
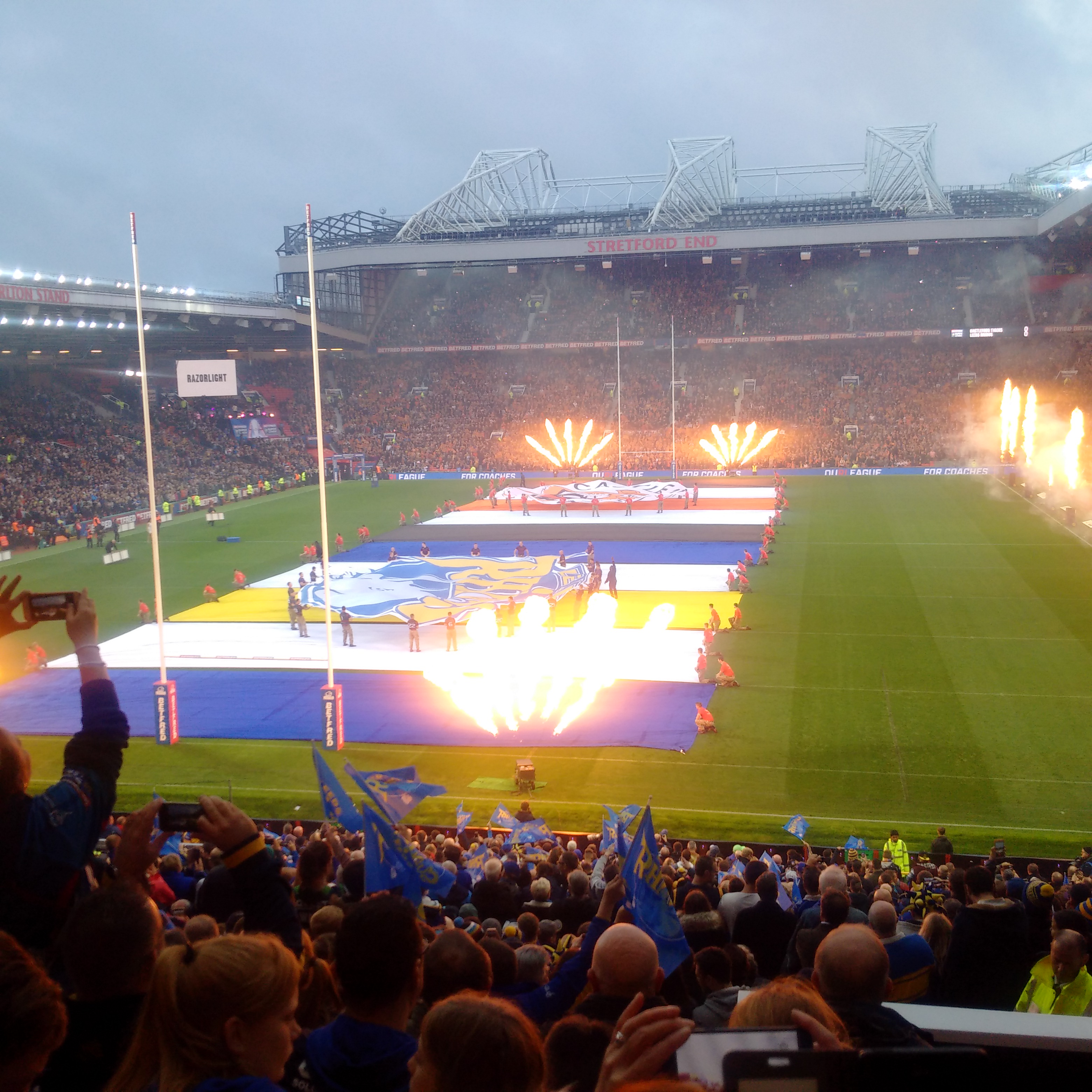
The Super League Grand Final is the current method of determining the champion

The method of determining the champions has changed multiple times between using the first past the post method and a play off series. A play off series was first used in 1906: this was due to some clubs playing more games than others and league positions being decided by win percentages rather than competition points.

Most seasons have been decided by a play off format. Between 1973 and 1997 was the longest era where a first place league finish was used to decide the champions.

Years	Method	Competition
1895–96	League leaders	First Division
1896–1901: Counties League
1901–06	League leaders	First Division
1906–15	Playoffs	Championship Final
1915–18: Wartime Emergency League
1919–39	Playoffs	Championship Final
1939–41: Counties League
1941–45: Wartime Emergency League
1945–47	League leaders	First Division
1947–62	Playoffs	Championship Final
1962–64	League leaders	First Division
1964–73	Playoffs	Championship Final
1973–96	League leaders	First Division
1996–97	League leaders	Super League
1998–present	Playoffs	Grand Final

== List of Champions ==
‡	Winning team won the Double (League title and Challenge Cup)
†	Winning team won the Domestic Treble
§	Winning team won All Four Cups or the Quadruple
#	Final went to extra time

- (In bracket, title count):

Ed.	Season	Champions (number of titles)	Score	Runners up
Northern Rugby Football Union Championship (1895–1922)
1	1895–96	Manningham (1)	N/A	Halifax
-	1896–1901	County Championships		
2	1901–02	Broughton (1) ‡	N/A	Salford
3	1902–03	Halifax (1) ‡	N/A	Salford
4	1903–04	Bradford F.C. (1)	N/A	Salford
5	1904–05	Oldham (1)	N/A	Bradford F.C.
6	1905–06	Leigh (1)	N/A	Hunslet
7	1906–07	Halifax (2)	18–3	Oldham
8	1907–08	Hunslet (1) §	12–7	Oldham
9	1908–09	Wigan (1)	7–3	Oldham
10	1909–10	Oldham (2)	13–7	Wigan
11	1910–11	Oldham (3)	20–7	Wigan
12	1911–12	Huddersfield (1)	13–5	Wigan
13	1912–13	Huddersfield (2) †	29–2	Wigan
14	1913–14	Salford (1)	5–3	Huddersfield
15	1914–15	Huddersfield (3) §	35–2	Leeds
-	1915–1918	Official competition suspended due to First World War		
-	1918–19	County Championship		
16	1919–20	Hull F.C. (1)	3–2	Huddersfield
17	1920–21	Hull F.C. (2)	16–14	Hull Kingston Rovers
18	1921–22	Wigan (2)	13–2	Oldham
Northern Rugby Football League Championship (1922–1980)
19	1922–23	Hull Kingston Rovers (1)	15–5	Huddersfield
20	1923–24	Batley (1)	13–7	Wigan
21	1924–25	Hull Kingston Rovers (2)	9–5	Swinton
22	1925–26	Wigan (3)	22–10	Warrington
23	1926–27	Swinton (1)	13–8	St Helens Recreation
24	1927–28	Swinton (2) §	11–0	Featherstone Rovers
25	1928–29	Huddersfield (4)	2–0	Leeds
26	1929–30	Huddersfield (5)	10–0	Leeds
27	1930–31	Swinton (3)	14–7	Leeds
28	1931–32	St. Helens (1)	9–5	Huddersfield
29	1932–33	Salford (2)	15–5	Swinton
30	1933–34	Wigan (4)	15–3	Salford
31	1934–35	Swinton (4)	14–3	Warrington
32	1935–36	Hull F.C. (3)	21–2	Widnes
33	1936–37	Salford (3)	13–11	Warrington
34	1937–38	Hunslet (2)	8–2	Leeds
35	1938–39	Salford (4)	8–6	Castleford
-	1939–1945	Official competition suspended due to Second World War		
36	1945–46	Wigan (5)	13-4	Huddersfield
37	1946–47	Wigan (6)	13-4	Dewsbury
38	1947–48	Warrington (1)	15–5	Bradford
39	1948–49	Huddersfield (6)	13–12	Warrington
40	1949–50	Wigan (7)	20–2	Huddersfield
41	1950–51	Workington Town (1)	26–11	Warrington
42	1951–52	Wigan (8)	13–6	Bradford
43	1952–53	St. Helens (2)	24–14	Halifax
44	1953–54	Warrington (2) ‡	8–7	Halifax
45	1954–55	Warrington (3)	7–3	Oldham
46	1955–56	Hull F.C. (4)	10–9	Halifax
47	1956–57	Oldham (4)	15–14	Hull F.C.
48	1957–58	Hull F.C. (5)	20–3	Workington Town
49	1958–59	St. Helens (3)	44–22	Hunslet
50	1959–60	Wigan (9)	27–3	Wakefield Trinity
51	1960–61	Leeds (1)	25–10	Warrington
52	1961–62	Huddersfield (7)	14–5	Wakefield Trinity
53	1962–63	Swinton (5)	N/A	St. Helens
54	1963–64	Swinton (6)	N/A	Wigan
55	1964–65	Halifax (3)	15–7	St. Helens
56	1965–66	St. Helens (4) †	35–12	Halifax
57	1966–67	Wakefield Trinity (1)	21–9	St. Helens
58	1967–68	Wakefield Trinity (2)	17–10	Hull Kingston Rovers
59	1968–69	Leeds (2)	16–14	Castleford
60	1969–70	St. Helens (5)	24–12	Leeds
61	1970–71	St. Helens (6)	16–12	Wigan
62	1971–72	Leeds (3)	9–5	St. Helens
63	1972–73	Dewsbury (1)	22–13	Leeds
64	1973–74	Salford (5)	N/A	St. Helens
65	1974–75	St. Helens (7)	N/A	Wigan
66	1975–76	Salford (6)	N/A	Featherstone Rovers
67	1976–77	Featherstone Rovers (1)	N/A	St. Helens
68	1977–78	Widnes (1)	N/A	Bradford
69	1978–79	Hull Kingston Rovers(3)	N/A	Warrington
70	1979–80	Bradford (1)	N/A	Widnes
Rugby Football League Championship (1980–1996)
71	1980–81	Bradford (2)	N/A	Warrington
72	1981–82	Leigh (2)	N/A	Hull F.C.
73	1982–83	Hull F.C. (6)	N/A	Hull Kingston Rovers
74	1983–84	Hull Kingston Rovers (4)	N/A	Hull F.C.
75	1984–85	Hull Kingston Rovers (5)	N/A	St. Helens
76	1985–86	Halifax (4)	N/A	Wigan
77	1986–87	Wigan (10)	N/A	St. Helens
78	1987–88	Widnes (2)	N/A	St. Helens
79	1988–89	Widnes (3)	N/A	Wigan
80	1989–90	Wigan (11) ‡	N/A	Leeds
81	1990–91	Wigan (12) ‡	N/A	Widnes
82	1991–92	Wigan (13) †	N/A	St. Helens
83	1992–93	Wigan (14) ‡	N/A	St. Helens
84	1993–94	Wigan (15) §	N/A	Bradford
85	1994–95	Wigan (16) †	N/A	Leeds
86	1995–96	Wigan (17)	N/A	Leeds
Super League (1996–present)
87	1996	St. Helens (8) ‡	N/A	Wigan
88	1997	Bradford (3)	N/A	London
89	1998	Wigan (18)	10–4	Leeds
90	1999	St. Helens (9)	8–6	Bradford
91	2000	St. Helens (10)	29–16	Wigan
92	2001	Bradford (4)	37–6	Wigan
93	2002	St. Helens (11)	19–18	Bradford
94	2003	Bradford (5) §	25–12	Wigan
95	2004	Leeds (4)	16–8	Bradford
96	2005	Bradford (6)	15–6	Leeds
97	2006	St. Helens (12) §	26–4	Hull F.C.
98	2007	Leeds (5)	33–6	St. Helens
99	2008	Leeds (6)	24–16	St. Helens
100	2009	Leeds (7)	18–10	St. Helens
101	2010	Wigan (19)	22–10	St. Helens
102	2011	Leeds (8)	32–16	St. Helens
103	2012	Leeds (9)	26–18	Warrington
104	2013	Wigan (20) ‡	30–16	Warrington
105	2014	St. Helens (13)	14–6	Wigan
106	2015	Leeds (10) †	22–20	Wigan
107	2016	Wigan (21)	12–6	Warrington
108	2017	Leeds (11)	24–6	Castleford
109	2018	Wigan (22)	12–4	Warrington
110	2019	St. Helens (14)	23–6	Salford
111	2020	St. Helens (15)	8–4	Wigan
112	2021	St. Helens (16) ‡	12–10	Catalans
113	2022	St. Helens (17)	24–12	Leeds
114	2023	Wigan (23)	10–2	Catalans
115	2024	Wigan (24) §	9–2	Hull Kingston Rovers
116	2025	Hull Kingston Rovers (6) §	24–6	Wigan
117	2026	Wakefield Trinity (3)	23-10	Warrington

== Total titles won ==
There are 23 clubs who have won the British title, but only five have won the Super League since 1996. The most recent to join the list was Featherstone Rovers in 1977–78. Four clubs have finished runners up without ever winning a Championship: Castleford (1938–39, 1968–69, 2017), Catalans Dragons (2021, 2023), London Broncos (1997) and the now defunct St Helens Recs (1926–27).

Teams in bold currently compete in Super League as of the 2026 season.

§ Denotes club now defunct

Club	Winners	Runners-up	Winning seasons	Runners-up seasons
**Wigan**	24	18	1908/09, 1921/22, 1925/26, 1933/34, 1945/46, 1946/47, 1949/50, 1951/52, 1959/60, 1986/87, 1989/90, 1990/91, 1991/92, 1992/93, 1993/94, 1994/95, 1995/96, 1998, 2010, 2013, 2016, 2018, 2023, 2024	1909/10, 1910/11, 1911/12, 1912/13, 1923/24, 1963/64, 1970/71, 1974/75, 1985/86, 1988/89, 1996, 2000, 2001, 2003, 2014, 2015, 2020, 2025
**St. Helens**	17	16	1931/32, 1952/53, 1958/59, 1965/66, 1969/70, 1970/71, 1974/75, 1996, 1999, 2000, 2002, 2006, 2014, 2019, 2020, 2021, 2022	1962/63, 1964/65, 1966/67, 1971/72, 1973/74, 1976/77, 1984/85, 1986/87, 1987/88, 1991/92, 1992/93, 2007, 2008, 2009, 2010, 2011
**Leeds**	11	13	1960/61, 1968/69, 1971/72, 2004, 2007, 2008, 2009, 2011, 2012, 2015, 2017	1914/15, 1928/29, 1929/30, 1930/31, 1937/38, 1969/70, 1972/73, 1989/90, 1994/95, 1995/96, 1998, 2005, 2022
**Huddersfield**	7	6	1911/12, 1912/13, 1914/15, 1928/29, 1929/30, 1948/49, 1961/62	1913/14, 1919/20, 1922/23, 1931/32, 1945/46, 1949/50
**Bradford**	6	7	1979/80, 1980/81, 1997, 2001, 2003, 2005	1947/48, 1951/52, 1977/78, 1993/94, 1999, 2002, 2004
Salford	6	5	1913/14, 1932/33, 1936/37, 1938/39, 1973/74, 1975/76	1901/02, 1902/03, 1903/04, 1933/34, 2019
**Hull**	6	4	1919/20, 1920/21, 1935/36, 1955/56, 1957/58, 1982/83	1956/57, 1981/82, 1983/84, 2006
**Hull Kingston Rovers**	6	4	1922/23, 1924/25, 1978/79, 1983/84, 1984/85, 2025	1920/21, 1967/68, 1982/83, 2024
Swinton	6	2	1926/27, 1927/28, 1930/31, 1934/35, 1962/63, 1963/64	1924/25, 1932/33
Oldham	4	5	1904/05, 1909/10, 1910/11, 1956/57	1906/07, 1907/08, 1908/09, 1921/22, 1954/55
Halifax	4	5	1902/03, 1906/07, 1964/65, 1985/86	1895/96, 1952/53, 1953/54, 1955/56, 1965/66
**Warrington**	3	13	1947/48, 1953/54, 1954/55	1925/26, 1934/35, 1936/37, 1948/49, 1950/51, 1960/61, 1978/79, 1980/81, 2012, 2013, 2016, 2018, 2026
Widnes	3	3	1977/78, 1987/88, 1988/89	1935/36, 1979/80, 1990/91
**Wakefield Trinity**	3	2	1966/67, 1967/68, 2026	1959/60, 1961/62
Hunslet F.C. §	2	2	1907/08, 1937/38	1905/06, 1958/59
**Leigh**	2	0	1905/06, 1981/82	
Featherstone Rovers	1	2	1976/77	1927/28, 1975/76
Bradford F.C. §	1	1	1903/04	1904/05
Workington Town	1	1	1950/51	1957/58
Dewsbury	1	1	1972/73	1946/47
Manningham §	1	0	1895/96	
Broughton §	1	0	1901/02	
Batley	1	0	1923/24	
**Castleford**	0	3	N/A	1938/39, 1968/69, 2017
**Catalans**	0	2	N/A	2021, 2023
St Helens Recs §	0	1	N/A	1926/27
London	0	1	N/A	1997

=== Title droughts ===
Of the 19 clubs who still exist and have won a title, Batley have the longest drought having won their last title in 1924; 102 years ago. Of the current top flight teams, Castleford and Catalans have never won the title, while Warrington are waiting the longest for their next title having last won it in 1955; 71 years ago.

The longest gap between titles was Leigh who waited 76 years between 1906 and 1982.

The longest wait for a first title was by Featherstone Rovers who waited 75 years between their first season in 1902 and their title winning season in 1977.

Club	Years since last title
Wakefield Trinity	2026; 0 years ago
Hull Kingston Rovers	2025; 1 year ago
Wigan	2024; 2 years ago
St Helens	2022; 4 years ago
Leeds	2017; 9 years ago
Bradford	2005; 21 years ago
Widnes	1989; 37 years ago
Halifax	1986; 40 years ago
Hull F.C.	1983; 43 years ago
Leigh	1982; 44 years ago
Featherstone Rovers	1977; 49 years ago
Salford	1976; 50 years ago
Dewsbury	1973; 53 years ago
Swinton	1964; 62 years ago
Huddersfield	1962; 64 years ago
Oldham	1957; 69 years ago
Warrington	1955; 71 years ago
Workington Town	1951; 75 years ago
Batley	1924; 102 years ago

== See also ==
- Super League
- Rugby Football League Championship First Division
- Super League Grand Final
- Rugby Football League Championship Final
- List of British rugby league league leaders
- League Leaders Shield
- Australian rugby league premiers
