= Bill Jukes =

GB & England international rugby league footballer

Personal information
- Full name: William Jukes
- Born: c. 1883 Featherstone, England
- Died: March 1939 (aged 57) Beeston, Leeds, England

Playing information
- Height: 5 ft 8.5 in (1.740 m)
- Weight: 12 st 10 lb (81 kg)
- Position: Forward
Club
Years	Team	Pld	T	G	FG	P
1905–19	Hunslet	280	85	3	0	261
Representative
Years	Team	Pld	T	G	FG	P
1906–12	Yorkshire	10	1	0	0	3
1908–11	England	9	0	0	0	0
1908–10	Great Britain	6	0	0	0	0

William Jukes (c. 1883 – March 1939) was an English professional rugby league footballer who played in the 1900s and 1910s. He played at representative level for Great Britain, England and Yorkshire, and at club level for Featherstone Rovers (who were a "junior" club at the time) and Hunslet (281 official matches, plus 26 wartime matches) as a forward.

== Background ==
Bill Jukes was born in Featherstone, West Riding of Yorkshire, England, and his death aged 57 was registered in Beeston, Leeds, West Riding of Yorkshire, England.

== Playing career ==
=== Club career ===
Jukes played as a forward in Hunslet's 14–0 victory over Hull F.C. in the 1908 Challenge Cup Final during the 1907–08 season at Fartown Ground, Huddersfield on Saturday 25 April 1908, in front of a crowd of 18,000.

Jukes played as a forward in Hunslet's 13–3 victory over Halifax in the 1905 Yorkshire Cup Final during the 1905–06 season at Park Avenue, Bradford on Saturday 2 December 1905, and played as a forward in the 17–0 victory over Halifax in the 1907 Yorkshire Cup Final during the 1907–08 season at Headingley, Leeds on Saturday 21 December 1907.

Jukes was a member of Hunslet's 1907–08 season All Four Cups winning team, the Forwards were known as "The Terrible Six" they were; Tom Walsh, Harry Wilson, Jack Randall, Bill "Tubby" Brookes, Bill Jukes, and John Willie Higson.

Jukes scored the try in Hunslet's 3–3 draw with Australia during the 1911–12 Kangaroo tour of Great Britain at Parkside, Hunslet on Saturday 21 October 1911.

At the end of the 1919–20 season, a Testimonial match for both Bill Jukes, and Fred Smith, took place between Hunslet and Billy Batten's Hunslet XIII, a team of former Hunslet players, including a 48-year-old Albert Goldthorpe, who scored a drop goal, the match took place at Parkside, Hunslet.

=== International honours ===
Jukes won a number of caps for England while at Hunslet. In 1908 he won against Wales, in 1909 against Australia (3 matches), and Wales, in 1910 against Wales (2 matches), in 1911 against Australia (2 matches), and won caps for Great Britain while at Hunslet in 1908–09 against Australia (3 matches), and on the 1910 Great Britain Lions tour of Australia and New Zealand against Australia (2 matches), Australasia (2 matches), and New Zealand.
