= List of British rugby league league leaders =

The following is a list of teams that finished in first place of the top division in each year of British rugby league. From 1895 until 1996 this was the Rugby Football League Championship First Division. From 1996 this has been Super League. Since 2003, teams finishing first in regular season have been awarded the League Leaders' Shield.

Since its inception the league has had multiple different ways of organising its structure and the ultimate winner of the competition. Due to these structural changes, primarily involving the periodic inclusion and non-inclusion of a playoff system, the team that finished first in regular season have not always been champions. The longest era of the league winners also being crowned champions was between 1973 and 1997. Between 1973 and 1997 a distinct Play-off competition, the Rugby League Premiership, was held which preceded the return to the play off and grand final format.

A list of each season's champions can be found at List of British rugby league champions.

== List ==
Teams that have been declared champions based on league position, and hence not by playoffs, are denoted in bold.

Season
Season	League Leaguers
1895–96	**Manningham**
1896–1901: County Championships
1901–02	**Broughton Rangers**
1902–03	**Halifax**
1903–04	**Bradford F.C.**
1904–05	**Oldham**
1905–06	**Leigh**
1906–07	Halifax
1907–08	Oldham
1908–09	Wigan
1909–10	Oldham
1910–11	Wigan
1911–12	Huddersfield
1912–13	Huddersfield
1913–14	Huddersfield
1914–15	Huddersfield
1915–1918: Official competition suspended due to First World War
1918–19 County Championship
1919–20	Huddersfield
1920–21	Hull Kingston Rovers
1921–22	Oldham
1922–23	Hull F.C.
1923–24	Wigan
1924–25	Swinton
1925–26	Wigan
1926–27	St Helens Recs
1927–28	Swinton
1928–29	Huddersfield
1929–30	St Helens
1930–31	Swinton
1931–32	Huddersfield
1932–33	Salford
1933–34	Salford
1934–35	Swinton
1935–36	Hull F.C.
1936–37	Salford
1937–38	Hunslet
1938–39	Salford
1939–1945 Official competition suspended due to Second World War
1945–46	Wigan
1946–47	Wigan
1947–48	Wigan
1948–49	Warrington
1949–50	Wigan
1950–51	Warrington
1951–52	Bradford Northern
1952–53	St. Helens
1953–54	Halifax
1954–55	Warrington
1955–56	Warrington
1956–57	Oldham
1957–58	Oldham
1958–59	St. Helens
1959–60	St. Helens
1960–61	Leeds
1961–62	Wigan
1962–63	**Swinton**
1963–64	**Swinton**
1964–65	St. Helens
1965–66	St. Helens
1966–67	Leeds
1967–68	Leeds
1968–69	Leeds
1969–70	Leeds
1970–71	Wigan
1971–72	Leeds
1972–73	Warrington
1973–74	**Salford**
1974–75	**St. Helens**
1975–76	**Salford**
1976–77	**Featherstone Rovers**
1977–78	**Widnes**
1978–79	**Hull Kingston Rovers**
1979–80	**Bradford Northern**
1980–81	**Bradford Northern**
1981–82	**Leigh**
1982–83	**Hull F.C.**
1983–84	**Hull Kingston Rovers**
1984–85	**Hull Kingston Rovers**
1985–86	**Halifax**
1986–87	**Wigan**
1987–88	**Widnes**
1988–89	**Widnes**
1989–90	**Wigan**
1990–91	**Wigan**
1991–92	**Wigan**
1992–93	**Wigan**
1993–94	**Wigan**
1994–95	**Wigan**
1995–96	**Wigan**
1996	**St. Helens**
1997	**Bradford**
1998	Wigan
1999	Bradford
2000	Wigan
2001	Bradford
2002	St. Helens
2003	Bradford
2004	Leeds
2005	St. Helens
2006	St. Helens
2007	St. Helens
2008	St. Helens
2009	Leeds
2010	Wigan
2011	Warrington
2012	Wigan
2013	Huddersfield
2014	St. Helens
2015	Leeds
2016	Warrington
2017	Castleford
2018	St. Helens
2019	St. Helens
2020	Wigan
2021	Catalans
2022	St Helens
2023	Wigan
2024	Wigan
2025	Hull Kingston Rovers
2026	Wigan

== See also ==
- List of British rugby league champions
- League Leaders' Shield
- Minor premiership - Australian equivalent
