= Tom Walsh (rugby league, fl.1896–1910) =

English rugby league footballer

Personal information
- Full name: Thomas Walsh

Playing information
- Position: Forward
Club
Years	Team	Pld	T	G	FG	P
1896–1910	Hunslet	259	16	1	0	50

Tom Walsh was a professional rugby league footballer who played in the 1900s and 1910s. He played at club level for Hunslet, as a forward.

== Playing career ==
=== Challenge Cup Final appearances ===
Tom Walsh played as a forward in Hunslet's 14–0 victory over Hull F.C. in the 1907–08 Challenge Cup Final during the 1907–08 season at Fartown Ground, Huddersfield on Saturday 25 April 1908, in front of a crowd of 18,000.

=== County Cup Final appearances ===
Tom Walsh played as a forward in Hunslet's 13–3 victory over Halifax in the 1905–06 Yorkshire Cup Final during the 1905–06 season at Park Avenue, Bradford on Saturday 2 December 1905, and played as a forward in the 17–0 victory over Halifax in the 1907–08 Yorkshire Cup Final during the 1907–08 season at Headingley, Leeds on Saturday 21 December 1907.

=== All Four Cups, and "The Terrible Six" ===
Tom Walsh was a member of Hunslet's 1907–08 season All Four Cups winning team, the Forwards were known as "The Terrible Six" they were; Tom Walsh, Harry Wilson, Jack Randall, Bill "Tubby" Brookes, Bill Jukes, and John Willie Higson.
