= Bill Brookes =

England international rugby league footballer

Personal information
- Full name: William Brookes
- Born: c. 1882
- Died: 18 February 1947 (aged 65) Kippax, England

Playing information
- Position: Forward
Club
Years	Team	Pld	T	G	FG	P
1900–10	Hunslet	307	17	0	0	51
Representative
Years	Team	Pld	T	G	FG	P
1905–06	England	2	0	0	0	0

William Brookes (c. 1882 – 18 February 1947), also known by the nickname of "Tubby", was a professional rugby league footballer who played in the 1900s. He played at representative level for England, and at club level for Outwood Church ARLFC, Kippax ARLFC, and Hunslet, as a forward.

== Playing career ==
=== Club career ===
Brookes played as a forward in Hunslet's 13–3 victory over Halifax in the 1905–06 Yorkshire Cup Final during the 1905–06 season at Park Avenue, Bradford on Saturday 2 December 1905.

Brookes was a member of Hunslet's 1907–08 season All Four Cups winning team, the forwards were known as "The Terrible Six": Brookes, Tom Walsh, Harry Wilson, Jack Randall, Bill Jukes and John Willie Higson.

Brookes played as a forward in the 17–0 victory over Halifax in the 1907–08 Yorkshire Cup Final during the 1907–08 season at Headingley, Leeds on Saturday 21 December 1907, and played as a forward in Hunslet's 14–0 victory over Hull F.C. in the 1907–08 Challenge Cup Final during the 1907–08 season at Fartown Ground, Huddersfield on Saturday 25 April 1908, in front of a crowd of 18,000.

=== International honours ===
Brookes won caps for England while at Hunslet in 1905 against Other Nationalities, and in 1906 against Other Nationalities.
