= Fred Smith (rugby league, born c. 1885) =

GB & England international rugby league footballer

Personal information
- Born: c. 1885 Woodlesford, Leeds, England
- Died: unknown

Playing information
- Height: 5 ft 6 in (1.68 m)
- Weight: 12 st 5 lb (78 kg)
- Position: Stand-off, Scrum-half
Club
Years	Team	Pld	T	G	FG	P
1905–20	Hunslet	319
Representative
Years	Team	Pld	T	G	FG	P
≥1905–≤20	Yorkshire	7	2	0	0	6
1909–12	England	7	2	0	0	6
1910–14	Great Britain	10	1	0	0	3

Fred Smith (born c. 1885 – death unknown) was an English rugby league footballer who played in the 1900s, 1910s and 1920s. He played at representative level for Great Britain, England and Yorkshire, and at club level for Hunslet, as a stand-off, or scrum-half.

== Background ==
Fred Smith was born in Woodlesford, Leeds, West Riding of Yorkshire, England.

== Playing career ==
=== Club career ===
Smith played scrum-half, and scored a try in Hunslet's 14–0 victory over Hull F.C. in the 1908 Challenge Cup Final during the 1907–08 season at Fartown Ground, Huddersfield on Saturday 25 April 1908, in front of a crowd of 18,000.

Smith played at centre in Hunslet's 17–0 victory over Halifax in the 1907 Yorkshire Cup Final during the 1907–08 season at Headingley, Leeds on Saturday 21 December 1907.

Smith was a member of Hunslet's 1907–08 All Four Cups winning team.

At the end of the 1919–20 season, a Testimonial match for both Bill Jukes, and Fred Smith, took place between Hunslet and Billy Batten's Hunslet XIII, a team of former Hunslet players, including a 48-year-old Albert Goldthorpe, who scored a drop goal, the match took place at Parkside, Hunslet.

=== International honours ===
Smith won caps for England while at Hunslet in 1909 against Wales, in 1910 against Wales (2 matches), in 1911 against Wales, Australia (2 matches), in 1912 against Wales, and won caps for Great Britain while at Hunslet on the 1910 Great Britain Lions tour of Australia and New Zealand against Australia, Australasia and New Zealand, in 1911 against Australia (2 matches), in 1912 against Australia, and in 1914 against Australia (3 matches), and New Zealand.
