= Billy Little (rugby league, born 1879) =

England international rugby league footballer

Personal information
- Full name: William Beatty Little
- Born: 6 November 1879; Cumberland, England
- Died: 1965 (aged 85)

Playing information
- Position: Fullback
Club
Years	Team	Pld	T	G	FG	P
1901–10	Halifax	305	4	326	0	664
	Bradford Northern
	Total	305	4	326	0	664
Representative
Years	Team	Pld	T	G	FG	P
	Yorkshire	4
	Cumberland	8
1904	England	1	0	0	0	0

William Beatty Little (1879 – 1965) was an English professional rugby league footballer who played in the 1900s and 1910s. He played at representative level for England, Cumberland and Yorkshire, and at club level for Halifax and Bradford Northern, as a fullback.

== Background ==
Billy Little was born in Cumberland, England.

== Playing career ==
=== Club career ===
Billy Little made his début for Halifax on Saturday 21 September 1901, and he played his last match for Halifax on Monday 28 March 1910.

Little played fullback in Halifax's 7–0 victory over Salford in the 1902–03 Challenge Cup Final during the 1902–03 season at Headingley, Leeds on Saturday 25 April 1903, in front of a crowd of 32,507, and he played fullback in the 8–3 victory over Warrington in the 1903–04 Challenge Cup Final during the 1903–04 season at The Willows, Salford on Saturday 30 April 1904, in front of a crowd of 17,041.

Little played fullback in Halifax's 3–13 defeat by Hunslet in the 1905–06 Yorkshire Cup Final during the 1905–06 season at Park Avenue, Bradford on Saturday 2 December 1905, in front of a crowd of 18,500.

In January 1911, he was transferred to Bradford Northern for a fee of £50.

=== Representative honours ===
Billy Little won a cap for England while at Halifax in 1904 against Other Nationalities.

Billy Little won caps for Cumberland and Yorkshire while at Halifax.

== Honoured at Halifax ==
Billy Little is a Halifax Hall Of Fame Inductee.
