= Harry Wilson (rugby league) =

GB & England international rugby league & union footballer

Personal information
- Full name: Harry Wilson
- Born: 19 October 1877
- Died: unknown

Playing information

Rugby union
Club
Years	Team	Pld	T	G	FG	P
	Methley RFC
	Castleford RUFC
	Rothwell RFC
	Morley R.F.C.
	Total	0	0	0	0	0
Representative
Years	Team	Pld	T	G	FG	P
	Yorkshire

Rugby league
- Position: Forward
Club
Years	Team	Pld	T	G	FG	P
1898–1913	Hunslet	444	36	1	0	110
Representative
Years	Team	Pld	T	G	FG	P
1901–09	Yorkshire	13	1	0	0	3
1906–08	England	2	0	0	0	0
1908	Great Britain	3	0	0	0	0

Harry Wilson (19 October 1877 – death unknown) was an English rugby union and professional rugby league footballer who played in the 1890s and 1900s. He played representative level rugby union (RU) for Yorkshire, and at club level for Methley RFC (in Methley, Leeds, club now defunct), Castleford RUFC (in Castleford, Wakefield), Rothwell RFC (in Rothwell, Leeds, club now defunct), and Morley R.F.C. (in Morley, Leeds), and representative level rugby league (RL) for Great Britain, England and Yorkshire, and at club level for Hunslet, as a forward.

== Playing career ==
=== Challenge Cup Final appearances ===
Harry Wilson played as a forward in Hunslet's 14-0 victory over Hull F.C. in the 1907–08 Challenge Cup Final during the 1907–08 season at Fartown Ground, Huddersfield on Saturday 25 April 1908, in front of a crowd of 18,000.

=== County Cup Final appearances ===
Harry Wilson played as a forward in Hunslet's 13-3 victory over Halifax in the 1905 Yorkshire Cup Final during the 1905–06 season at Park Avenue, Bradford on Saturday 2 December 1905, and played as a forward in the 17-0 victory over Halifax in the 1907 Yorkshire Cup Final during the 1907–08 season at Headingley, Leeds on Saturday 21 December 1907.

=== All Four Cups, and "The Terrible Six" ===
Harry Wilson was a member of Hunslet's 1907–08 season All Four Cups winning team, the Forwards were known as "The Terrible Six" they were; Tom Walsh, Harry Wilson, Jack Randall, Bill "Tubby" Brookes, Bill Jukes and John Willie Higson.

=== Representative honours ===
Harry Wilson won caps for England (RL) while at Hunslet in 1906 against Other Nationalities, in 1908 against New Zealand, and won caps for Great Britain (RL) while at Hunslet in 1908 against New Zealand (3 matches).

Harry Wilson won cap(s) for Yorkshire (RU), and he won cap(s) for Yorkshire (RL) while at Hunslet, including against New Zealand at Belle Vue, Wakefield on Wednesday 18 December 1907.

== Family ==
Harry Wilson was the great-grandfather of the association footballer of the 1980s, 1990s and 2000s; Peter Swan.
