= Fred Farrar =

GB & England international rugby league footballer

Personal information
- Full name: Frederick Farrar
- Born: 11 November 1882 Farsley, Leeds, England
- Died: unknown

Playing information
- Height: 5 ft 8.5 in (1.740 m)
- Weight: 10 st 10 lb (68 kg)
- Position: Wing
Club
| Years | Team | Pld | T | G | FG | P |
|---|---|---|---|---|---|---|
| 1906 | Bramley | 10 |
| 1906–13 | Hunslet | 193 | 120 | 91 | 0 | 542 |
| 1912/13–≥12/13 | Keighley |
| ≥1914 | Hunslet (guest) |
| | Total | 203 | 120 | 91 | 0 | 542 |
Representative
| Years | Team | Pld | T | G | FG | P |
| | Yorkshire |
| 1910 | Great Britain | 0 | 0 | 0 | 0 | 0 |

Fred Farrar (born 11 November 1882 – death unknown), also known by the nickname of "The Farsley Flyer", was an English professional rugby league footballer who played in the 1900s and 1910s. He played at representative level for Great Britain (non-Test matches), and Yorkshire, and at club level for Bramley, Hunslet (two spells, including the second as a World War I guest) and Keighley, as a wing.

== Background ==
Fred Farrar was born in Farsley, Leeds, West Riding of Yorkshire, England, he was a boot and shoe merchant.

== Playing career ==
=== Club career ===
Farrar started his career at Bramley, making a try-scoring debut against Normanton in April 1906. He was transferred to Hunslet in October 1906.

Farrar was a member of the 1907–08 All Four Cups winning team, playing on the wing in the 17–0 victory over Halifax in the 1907 Yorkshire Cup Final at Headingley, Leeds on Saturday 21 December 1907, and scoring a try the 14–0 victory over Hull F.C., in the 1908 Challenge Cup Final at Fartown Ground, Huddersfield on Saturday 25 April 1908, in front of a crowd of 18,000.

=== Representative honours ===
Farrar was selected for Great Britain while at Hunslet for the 1910 Great Britain Lions tour of Australia and New Zealand.

Farrar was a reserve to travel for England against New Zealand, and had been previously complimented on his length-of-the field try for Hunslet against Leeds at Headingley by Hercules Richard "Bumper" Wright who was watching his first British rugby league match.

Farrar won caps for Yorkshire including against New Zealand at Belle Vue, Wakefield on Wednesday 18 December 1907, and Australia.

== Outside of rugby league ==
Farrar married Eliza Stead at Farsley Church in August 1906.

Farrar appeared in an advertising campaign for Zam-Buk, a herbal balm and antiseptic ointment. It was a patent medicine produced by the Zam-Buk Company of Leeds, England c. November 1906.
