= Philip Morgan =

Philip Morgan may refer to:

- Philip D. Morgan (born 1949), American historian
- Philip H. Morgan (1825–1900), American jurist
- Philip Morgan (bishop) (died 1435), Bishop of Worcester and Bishop of Ely and unsuccessful candidate for Archbishop of York
- Phil Morgan (rugby league), Welsh rugby league footballer of the 1960s and 1970s
- Phil Morgan (rugby union), Welsh rugby union player
- S. Philip Morgan (born 1953), professor of sociology
- Phil Morgan (footballer) (born 1974), English football goalkeeper
- Philip Morgan (cricketer) (1927–2017), English sportsman, clergyman and educator
