= 1905–06 Yorkshire Cup =

1905 Yorkshire Cup
- Structure: Regional knockout championship
- Teams: 20
- Winners: Hunslet
- Runners-up: Halifax

The 1905 Yorkshire Cup competition was a knock-out competition between (mainly professional) rugby league clubs from the county of Yorkshire. 1905 was the inaugural year for the Rugby League Yorkshire Cup competition. The cup was won by Hunslet who beat Halifax by a score of 13–3.

== Background ==
Following the great schism of 1895 which led to the formation of rugby league there appear to be very little interest in a competitive competition organised on a regional basis, at least between clubs based in Yorkshire. Prior to the breakaway from rugby union this was something that had been discouraged as it was feared that competition would lead to professionalism, as had happened in other sports like Association Football.
One of the exceptions was the trophy played for by the Yorkshire Rugby Union clubs. "T'owd Tin Pot", or officially, the Yorkshire Challenge Cup. The Governing body of the RFU were appalled at the idea, but turned a blind eye as all the proceeds from the final were distributed among various charities.

It was around 10 years after the "great schism" before the idea of a County Cup for the Rugby League game became a reality. There appears to be very little, if any, details of how the introduction of the county cup competitions came about, or any details of any of the instigators or of any campaign, but the County Cups became the last part of what would become known as the four cups. The competitions were played on the same basis as was the Challenge Cup, i.e. a free draw with matches played on a sudden death straight knock-out basis, and with the final played (usually) on a neutral ground.

== Competition and results ==
For this inaugural competition, a total of twenty clubs had entered, and so a preliminary round was introduced involving eight clubs, to reduce the number of clubs taking part in the main competition to sixteen, a full complement for a four round knock-out tournament.

=== Preliminary round ===
Involved 4 matches and 8 clubs

Game No	Fixture date	Home team	Score	Away team	Venue	Ref
P1	Sat 16 Sep 1905	Featherstone Rovers (Note: Featherstone Rovers were at the time a junior/amateur club from Featherstone)	9–10	Huddersfield	unknown	
P2	Wed 04 Oct 1905	York	2–0	Pontefract	Clarence Street	
P3	Sat 07 Oct 1905	Outwood Parish Church (Note: Outwood Parish Church were a junior/amateur club from Outwood (a district to the North of Wakefield) who were playing in the Yorkshire Second Competition (Eastern Section))	3–0	Normanton	unknown	
P4	Sat 07 Oct 1905	Saville Green (Note: Saville Green were a junior/amateur club from the East Leeds area)	10–0	Brighouse Rangers	unknown	

=== Round 1 ===
Involved 5 matches (with three byes) and 13 Clubs

Game No	Fixture date	Home team	Score	Away team	Venue	Ref
1	Sat 14 Oct 1905	Batley	7–2	Wakefield Trinity	Mount Pleasant	
2	Sat 14 Oct 1905	Hull	5–2	Bramley	Barley Mow (Note: RUGBYLEAGUEproject gives Bramley as the home team (and playing at Barley Mow) but the official Hull F.C. archives give the venue as Boulevard, Hull FC's home ground)	
3	Sat 14 Oct 1905	Dewsbury	0–0	Bradford	Crown Flatt	
4	Sat 14 Oct 1905	Keighley	30–8	Castleford (1896)	Lawkholme Lane	
5	Sat 14 Oct 1905	Leeds	5–7	Halifax	Headingley	
6	Sat 14 Oct 1905	Outwood Parish Church	0–24	Hull Kingston Rovers	unknown	
7	Sat 14 Oct 1905	York	4–3	Huddersfield	Clarence Street	
8	Sat 21 Oct 1905	Hunslet	14–0	Saville Green	Parkside	

=== Round 1 - Replays ===
Involved 1 match and 2 Clubs

Game No	Fixture date	Home team	Score	Away team	Venue	Ref
R	Tue 24 Oct 1905	Bradford	5–0	Dewsbury	Park Avenue	

=== Round 2 - Quarterfinals ===
Involved 4 matches and 8 Clubs

Game No	Fixture date	Home team	Score	Away team	Venue	Ref
1	Sat 28 Oct 1905	Batley	5–5	Hull Kingston Rovers	Mount Pleasant	
2	Sat 28 Oct 1905	Halifax	10–0	Hull	Thrum Hall	
3	Sat 28 Oct 1905	Hunslet	37–3	Keighley	Parkside	
4	Sat 28 Oct 1905	York	2–0	Bradford	Clarence Street	

=== Round 2 - Replays ===
Involved 1 match and 2 Clubs

Game No	Fixture date	Home team	Score	Away team	Venue	Ref
R	Tue 07 Nov 1905	Hull Kingston Rovers	7–4	Batley	Craven Street (off Holderness Road)	

=== Round 3 – semifinals ===
Involved 2 matches and 4 Clubs

Game No	Fixture date	Home team	Score	Away team	Venue	Ref
1	Sat 18 Nov 1905	Halifax	11–5	York	Thrum Hall	
2	Sat 18 Nov 1905	Hull Kingston Rovers	3A12 (Note: Match abandoned after 63 minutes due to "bad light")	Hunslet	Craven Street (off Holderness Road)	

=== Semifinal - Replays ===
Involved 1 match and 2 Clubs

Game No	Fixture date	Home team	Score	Away team	Venue	Ref
R	Wed 22 Nov 1905	Hunslet	14–3	Hull Kingston Rovers	Parkside (Note: Unknown reason for replayed fixture being reversed instead at Craven Park.)	

=== Final ===
The match was played at Park Avenue in the City of Bradford, now in West Yorkshire. The attendance was 18,500 and receipts were £465.

Game No	Fixture date	Home team	Score	Away team	Venue	Att	Rec	Ref
	Saturday 2 December 1905	Hunslet	13–3	Halifax	Park Avenue (Note: Park Avenue was the home ground of Bradford from 1880 until "The Great Betrayal", in 1907. Although the ground capacity is not known it is estimated to have been between 20,000-30,000)	18500	465	

==== Teams and scorers ====
Hunslet	№	Halifax
	teams	
Herbert Place	1	Billy Little
Charlie Ward	2	Herman Hartley
William Eagers	3	Wax Williams
Walter Goldthorpe	4	William Wedgewood
William Ward	5	W. Drummond
Albert Goldthorpe	6	Joe Riley
Albert Everson	7	James Hilton
Jack Shooter	8	Ike Bartle
Bill Jukes	9	Fred Hammond
Bill Brookes	10	George Langhorn
Walter Wray	11	Walter Morton
Harry Wilson	12	Reggie Norton
Harry Wilcox	13	Jack Riley
Tom Walsh	14	Jack Swinbank
Jack Glew	15	Bob Winskill
	Coaches	
13	score	3
4	HT	3
Scorers
Charlie Ward (1)	Tries	W. Drummond (1)
Walter Goldthorpe (2)	Goals	
Albert Goldthorpe (3)	Goals	
Referee		William McCutcheon (Oldham)

Points Value: Try = 3 points; Goal (any type)= 2 points

=== The road to success ===
The following chart excludes any preliminary round fixtures/results

First round
Batley	7
Wakefield Trinity	2
Outwood Parish Church	0
Hull Kingston Rovers	24
Hunslet	14
Saville Green	0
Keighley	30
Castleford (1896)	8
Leeds	5
Halifax	7
Hull	5
Bramley	2
York	4
Huddersfield	3
Dewsbury	0 (0)
Bradford	0 (5)

Second round
Batley	5 (4)
Hull Kingston Rovers	5 (7)
Hunslet	37
Keighley	3
Halifax	10
Hull	0
York	2
Bradford	0

Semifinals
Hull Kingston Rovers	3 (3)
Hunslet	12 (14)
Halifax	11
York	5

Final
Hunslet	13
Halifax	3

== See also ==
- 1905–06 Northern Rugby Football Union season
- Rugby league county cups
