= Herbert Place =

England international rugby league footballer

Personal information
- Full name: Herbert Place
- Born: October 1882; Hunslet, Yorkshire, England
- Died: 4 November 1928 (aged 46); Hunslet, Yorkshire, England

Playing information
- Position: Fullback, Wing
Club
Years	Team	Pld	T	G	FG	P
1900–20	Hunslet	426	8	22	0	68
Representative
Years	Team	Pld	T	G	FG	P
1909–11	Yorkshire	3	0	2	0	4
1909	England	1	0	0	0	0

Herbert Place (October 1882 – 4 November 1928) was an English professional rugby league footballer who played in the 1900s, 1910s and 1920s. He played at representative level for England, and at club level for Hunslet, as a fullback or wing.

== Early life and family ==
Place was born in Hunslet, Leeds, to Arthur Place, a boot repairer, and Jane Hawden. He was baptised Methodist at three weeks old. He married Sarah Emma Storer in 1903 and had a son, John Arthur Place, the next year. He later worked in the same profession as his father.

== Playing career ==
=== Club career ===
Place made his début for Hunslet in 1900, and went on to make over 400 appearances for the club.

Place played fullback in Hunslet's 13-3 victory over Halifax in the 1905 Yorkshire Cup Final during the 1905–06 season at Park Avenue, Bradford on Saturday 2 December 1905, in front of a crowd of 18,500, and played on the wing in the 17-0 victory over Halifax in the 1907 Yorkshire Cup Final during the 1907–08 season at Headingley, Leeds on Saturday 21 December 1907, in front of a crowd of 15,000.

Place played fullback in Hunslet's 14-0 victory over Hull F.C. in the 1908 Challenge Cup Final during the 1907–08 season at Fartown Ground, Huddersfield on Saturday 25 April 1908, in front of a crowd of 18,000.

Place was a member of Hunslet's 1907–08 All Four Cups winning team.

=== International honours ===
Place won a cap for England while at Hunslet in 1909 against Wales.
