= John Higson =

GB & England international rugby league footballer (1887–1958)

John "Willie" Higson

Personal information
- Full name: John William Higson
- Born: third ¼ 1887 Pontefract district, England
- Died: fourth ¼ 1958 (aged 74) Wakefield district, England

Playing information
- Position: Forward
Club
Years	Team	Pld	T	G	FG	P
1905–10	Hunslet	112	12		0	36
1910–20	Huddersfield	225	24		0	72
1921–25	Featherstone Rovers	99	11	0	0	33
1925–27	Wakefield Trinity	59	3	0	0	9
	Total	495	50	0	0	150
Representative
Years	Team	Pld	T	G	FG	P
1908–09	Great Britain	2	0	0	0	0
1908–09	England	3	0	0	0	0
- Relatives: Len Higson (son)

John William Higson (third ¼ 1887 – fourth ¼ 1958) was an English professional rugby league footballer who played in the 1900s, 1910s and 1920s. He played at representative level for Great Britain and England, and at club level for Featherstone Rovers (two spells, pre & post-Northern Union), Hunslet, Huddersfield and Wakefield Trinity, as a forward.

== Background ==
John Higson's birth was registered in Pontefract district, West Riding of Yorkshire, England, and his death aged 74 was registered in Wakefield district, West Riding of Yorkshire, England.

== Playing career ==
=== Hunslet ===
Higson played for Featherstone Rovers before they joined the Northern Union, he was transferred from Featherstone Rovers to Hunslet in 1905.

Higson was a member of Hunslet's 1907–08 season All Four Cups winning team, the Forwards were known as "The Terrible Six" they were; Tom Walsh, Harry Wilson, Jack Randall, Bill "Tubby" Brookes, Bill Jukes, and John Willie Higson, he was also a member of Huddersfield's 1914–15 All Four Cups winning "Team of All Talents", and consequently is the only player to win All Four Cups on two occasions.

Higson played as a forward in Hunslet's 17–0 victory over Halifax in the 1907 Yorkshire Cup Final during the 1907–08 season at Headingley, Leeds on Saturday 21 December 1907. Higson played as a forward in Hunslet's 14–0 victory over Hull F.C. in the 1908 Challenge Cup Final during the 1907–08 season at Fartown Ground, Huddersfield on Saturday 25 April 1908, in front of a crowd of 18,000.

=== Huddersfield ===
Higson was transferred to Huddersfield, and played and scored a try in Huddersfield's 22–10 victory over Hull Kingston Rovers in the 1911 Yorkshire Cup Final during the 1911–12 season at Belle Vue, Wakefield on Saturday 25 November 1911

=== Featherstone Rovers ===
He rejoined Featherstone Rovers in 1921 playing alongside; Ernest Barraclough and Billy Clements, he made his début for Featherstone Rovers in the Northern Union on Saturday 17 September 1921, he played his last match for Featherstone Rovers in the 29–16 victory over York at Post Office Road, Featherstone on Saturday 25 April 1925.

John Higson's benefit season/testimonial match at Featherstone Rovers took place during the 1921–22 season.

=== Wakefield Trinity ===
He made his début for Wakefield Trinity during October 1925. He played as a forward in Wakefield Trinity's 3–10 defeat by Huddersfield in the 1926 Yorkshire Cup Final during the 1926–27 season at Headingley, Leeds on Wednesday 1 December 1926, the original match on Saturday 27 November 1926 was postponed due to fog.

=== International honours ===
John Higson won caps for England while at Hunslet in 1908 against Wales, and in 1909 against Australia (two matches), and won caps for Great Britain while at Hunslet in 1908 against Australia, and in 1909 against Australia.

== Personal life ==
John Higson was the father of the rugby league footballer; Leonard Higson.
