= Harry Taylor (rugby league) =

GB & England international rugby league footballer and coach

Personal information
- Full name: William Harry Taylor
- Born: c. 1878
- Died: January 1949 (aged 71)

Playing information
- Position: Fullback
Club
Years	Team	Pld	T	G	FG	P
1897–11	Hull F.C.	363	9	5
Representative
Years	Team	Pld	T	G	FG	P
1900–08	Yorkshire	19	0	0	0	0
1908	England	2	0	0	0	0
1908	Great Britain	3	0	0	0	0

Coaching information
Club
Years	Team	Gms	W	D	L	W%
	Hull F.C.	0	0	0	0

William Henry "Harry" Taylor (c. 1878 – January 1949) was an English professional rugby league footballer who played in the 1890s, 1900s and 1910s. He played at representative level for Great Britain (captain), England and Yorkshire, and at club level for Hull F.C., as a fullback, making his début in the 5–10 away defeat by Bradford on Saturday 1 January 1898, and was captain of Hull during the 1902–03, 1903–04, 1907–08 and 1908–09 seasons, and coached at club level for Hull.

== Playing career ==
=== Challenge Cup Final appearances ===
Harry Taylor played fullback, and was captain in Hull F.C.'s 0–14 defeat by Hunslet in the 1907–08 Challenge Cup Final during the 1907–08 season at Fartown Ground, Huddersfield on Saturday 25 April 1908, in front of a crowd of 18,000, played fullback, and was captain in Hull F.C.'s 0–17 defeat by Wakefield Trinity in the 1908–09 Challenge Cup Final during the 1908–09 season at Headingley, Leeds on Saturday 24 April 1909, in front of a crowd of 23,587, and played fullback in the 7–7 draw with Leeds in the 1909–10 Challenge Cup Final during the 1909–10 season at Fartown Ground, Huddersfield, on Saturday 16 April 1910, in front of a crowd of 19,413, this was the first Challenge Cup Final to be drawn, but he did not play in the 12–26 defeat by Leeds in the replay at Fartown Ground, Huddersfield, on Monday 18 April 1910.

=== Representative honours ===
Taylor won caps for England while at Hull in 1908 against Wales, and New Zealand, and won 3 caps for Great Britain while at Hull in 1908 against New Zealand (3 matches) in which he was captain in all 3 tests. He was the captain against New Zealand in the first ever Test for Great Britain, at Headingley, Leeds on Saturday 25 January 1908.

Taylor won 18-cap(s) for Yorkshire while at Hull, including against New Zealand at Belle Vue, Wakefield on Wednesday 18 December 1907.
