= Rugby Football League Championship Final =

RFL Championship Final
- Sport: Rugby league
- Instituted: 1907–08
- Ceased: 1972–73
- Replaced by: Grand Final
- Number of teams: 2
- Country: England
- Last winners: Dewsbury (1st Title)
- Most titles: Wigan Warriors (7 titles)

The RFL Championship Final was a playoff series at the end of the RFL Championship season to determine the winners of the Championship. It was first contested in 1908 between Hunslet and Oldham, but folded in 1972. The Super League Grand Final replaced it in 1998.

== Champions ==
Season	Final Information				
Season	Champions	Score	Runners-up	Venue	Attendance
1906–07	Halifax	18–3	Oldham	Fartown, Huddersfield	13,200
1907–08	Hunslet	12–7	Oldham	The Willows, Salford	14,000
1908–09	Wigan	7–3	Oldham	The Willows, Salford	12,000
1909–10	Oldham	13–7	Wigan	Wheater's Field, Salford	10,850
1910–11	Oldham	20–7	Wigan	Wheater's Field, Salford	15,543
1911–12	Huddersfield	13–5	Wigan	Thrum Hall, Halifax	15,000
1912–13	Huddersfield	29–2	Wigan	Belle Vue, Wakefield	17,000
1913–14	Salford	5–3	Huddersfield	Headingley, Leeds	8,091
1914–15	Huddersfield	35–2	Leeds	Belle Vue, Wakefield	14,000
1916-1918: No Final
1919–20	Hull F.C.	3–2	Huddersfield	Headingley, Leeds	12,900
1920–21	Hull F.C.	16–14	Hull Kingston Rovers	Headingley, Leeds	10,000
1921–22	Wigan	13–2	Oldham	The Cliff, Salford	26,000
1922–23	Hull Kingston Rovers	15–5	Huddersfield	Headingley, Leeds	14,000
1923–24	Batley	13–7	Wigan	The Cliff, Salford	13,729
1924–25	Hull Kingston Rovers	9–5	Swinton	Athletic Grounds, Rochdale	21,580
1925–26	Wigan	22–10	Warrington	Knowsley Road, St Helens	20,000
1926–27	Swinton	13–8	St Helens Recs	Wilderspool, Warrington	24,432
1927–28	Swinton	11–0	Featherstone Rovers	Watersheddings, Oldham	15,451
1928–29	Huddersfield	2–0	Leeds	Thrum Hall, Halifax	25,604
1929–30	Huddersfield	10–2	Leeds	Belle Vue, Wakefield	32,095
1930–31	Swinton	14–7	Leeds	Central Park, Wigan	31,000
1931–32	St. Helens	9–5	Huddersfield	Belle Vue	19,386
1932–33	Salford	15–5	Swinton	Central Park, Wigan	18,000
1933–34	Wigan	15–3	Salford	Wilderspool, Warrington	31,564
1934–35	Swinton	14–3	Warrington	Central Park, Wigan	27,700
1935–36	Hull F.C.	21–2	Widnes	Fartown, Huddersfield	17,276
1936–37	Salford	13–11	Warrington	Central Park, Wigan	31,500
1937–38	Hunslet	8–2	Leeds	Elland Road, Leeds	54,112
1938–39	Salford	8–6	Castleford	Maine Road, Manchester	69,504
1940-1944: No Final
1945–46	Wigan	13–4	Huddersfield	Maine Road, Manchester	67,136
1946–47	Wigan	13–4	Dewsbury	Maine Road, Manchester	40,599
1947–48	Warrington	15–5	Bradford Northern	Maine Road, Manchester	69,143
1948–49	Huddersfield	13–12	Warrington	Maine Road, Manchester	75,194
1949–50	Wigan	20–2	Huddersfield	Maine Road, Manchester	65,065
1950–51	Workington Town	26–11	Warrington	Maine Road, Manchester	61,618
1951–52	Wigan	13–6	Bradford Northern	Leeds Road, Huddersfield	48,684
1952–53	St. Helens	24–14	Halifax	Maine Road, Manchester	51,083
1953–54	Warrington	8–7	Halifax	Maine Road, Manchester	36,519
1954–55	Warrington	7–3	Oldham	Maine Road, Manchester	49,434
1955–56	Hull F.C.	10–9	Halifax	Maine Road, Manchester	36,675
1956–57	Oldham	15–14	Hull	Odsal, Bradford	62,233
1957–58	Hull F.C.	20–3	Workington Town	Odsal, Bradford	57,699
1958–59	St. Helens	44–22	Hunslet	Odsal, Bradford	52,560
1959–60	Wigan	27–3	Wakefield Trinity	Odsal, Bradford	83,190
1960–61	Leeds	25–10	Warrington	Odsal, Bradford	52,177
1961–62	Huddersfield	14–5	Wakefield Trinity	Odsal, Bradford	37,451
1964–65	Halifax	15–7	St. Helens	Station Road, Swinton	20,776
1965–66	St. Helens	35–12	Halifax	Station Road, Swinton	30,634
1966–67	Wakefield Trinity	7-7	St. Helens	Headingley, Leeds	20,161
(Replay)	Wakefield Trinity	21–9	St. Helens	Station Road, Swinton	33,547
1967–68	Wakefield Trinity	17–10	Hull Kingston Rovers	Headingley, Leeds	22,586
1968–69	Leeds	16–14	Castleford	Odsal, Bradford	28,442
1969–70	St. Helens	24–12	Leeds	Odsal, Bradford	26,358
1970–71	St. Helens	16–12	Wigan	Station Road, Swinton	21,745
1971–72	Leeds	9–5	St. Helens	Station Road, Swinton	24,055
1972–73	Dewsbury	22–13	Leeds	Odsal, Bradford	18,889

== Winning records by club ==
	Club	Winners	Runners-up	Winning seasons
1	Wigan	24	16	1908–09, 1921–22, 1925–26, 1933–34, 1945–46, 1946–47, 1949–50, 1951–52, 1959–60, 1986–87, 1989–90, 1990–91, 1991–92, 1992–93, 1993–94, 1994–95, 1995–96, 1998, 2010, 2013, 2016, 2018, 2023, 2024
2	St. Helens	17	16	1931–32, 1952–53, 1958–59, 1965–66, 1969–70, 1970–71, 1974–75, 1996, 1999, 2000, 2002, 2006, 2014, 2019, 2020, 2021, 2022
3	Leeds	10	11	1960–61, 1968–69, 1971–72, 2004, 2007, 2008, 2009, 2011, 2012, 2015
4	Huddersfield	7	6	1911–12, 1912–13, 1914–15, 1928–29, 1929–30, 1948–49, 1961–62
5	Bradford	6	7	1979–80, 1980–81, 1997, 2001, 2003, 2005
6	Salford	6	4	1913–14, 1932–33, 1936–37, 1938–39, 1973–74, 1975–76
7	Hull F.C.	6	4	1919–20, 1920–21, 1935–36, 1955–56, 1957–58, 1982–83
8	Swinton	6	2	1926–27, 1927–28, 1930–31, 1934–35, 1962–63, 1963–64
9	Hull Kingston Rovers	5	3	1922–23, 1924–25, 1978–79, 1983–84, 1984–85
10	Oldham	4	5	1904–05, 1909–10, 1910–11, 1956–57
11	Halifax	4	5	1902–03, 1906–07, 1964–65, 1985–86
12	Warrington	3	11	1947–48, 1953–54, 1954–55
13	Widnes	3	4	1977–78, 1987–88, 1988–89
14	Hunslet §	2	2	1907–08, 1937–38
15	Wakefield Trinity	2	2	1966–67, 1967–68
16	Leigh	2	0	1905–06, 1981–82
17	Featherstone Rovers	1	2	1976–77
18	Bradford F.C. §	1	1	1903–04
19	Workington Town	1	1	1950–51
20	Dewsbury	1	1	1972–73
21	Manningham §	1	0	1895–96
22	Broughton Rangers	1	0	1901–02
23	Batley	1	0	1923–24
24	Castleford	0	2	
25	St Helens Recs §	0	1	
26	London	0	1	

- § Denotes club now defunct

== See also ==
- Super League Grand Final
