= Ernest Ward (1900s rugby league player) =

England international rugby league footballer

Personal information
- Full name: Ernest Ward

Playing information
- Position: Centre
Club
Years	Team	Pld	T	G	FG	P
1904–11	Halifax	169	37	3	0	117
	Dewsbury
	Total	169	37	3	0	117
Representative
Years	Team	Pld	T	G	FG	P
1907–09	Yorkshire	3	0	0	0	0
1909	England	1	0	0	0	0

Ernest Ward was an English professional rugby league footballer who played in the 1900s. He played at representative level for England, and at club level for Halifax.

== Playing career ==
Ward played for Halifax between 1904 and 1911, and played for the club in their 1908–09 Yorkshire Cup final victory against Hunslet. In November 1911, he transferred to Dewsbury.

Ward won a cap for England while at Halifax in 1909 against Australia.

== Personal life ==
Ward married in September 1909 to Georgina Meskimon. His son, also named Ernest Ward, played rugby league for Bradford Northern.
