= League Leaders' Shield =

Rugby trophy

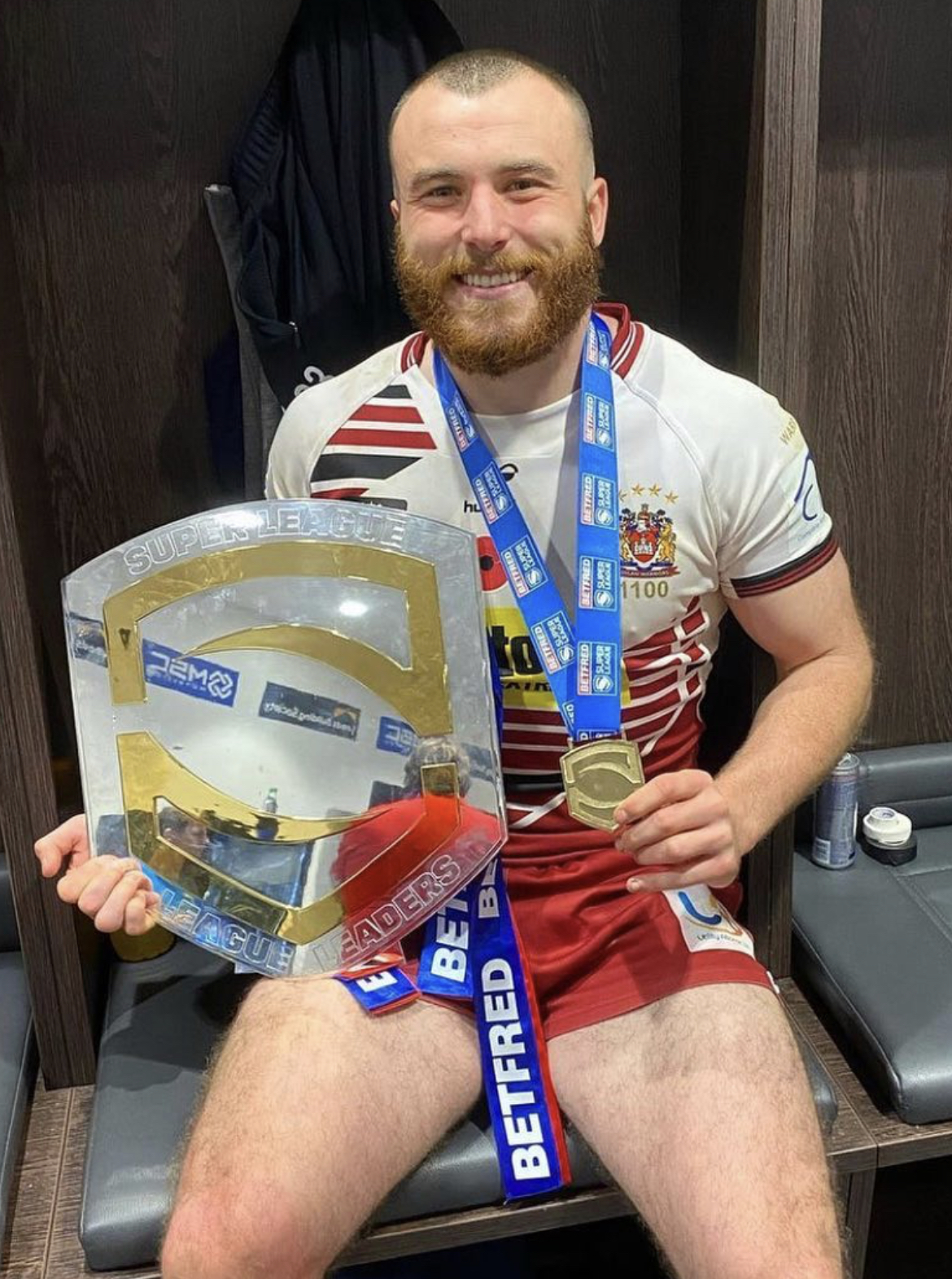
- Wigan player Jake Bibby holding the League Leaders' Shield and wearing the associated medal, 2020
- Country: England; France
- Presented by: Super League

History
- First award: 2003
- Most wins: St. Helens (8 titles)
- Most recent: 2026; Wigan Warriors (6th title)

The League Leaders' Shield is a trophy awarded to the team finishing the season top of Super League in the sport of rugby league football. This regular portion of the season precedes the playoffs for the eventual Super League Grand Final. The trophy was first awarded in Super League VIII in 2003.

Bradford Bulls won the first shield in 2003, but St. Helens have won it most, winning it on a total of 8 occasions.

Wigan Warriors became only the 2nd team (along with St Helens), to retain the shield in 2024.

== History ==
From 1907 until 1973 the Championship was awarded to the team winning a top-four play-off (excluding the 2 seasons 1962–63 and 1963–64, when the championship was awarded to the top-placed team). From 1907 to 1962 no prize was awarded to the team finishing top. From 1965 to 1973 a 'League Leaders' Trophy' was introduced to reward the team finishing top. In 1996, Super League was formed but continued to use the league to decide the champions until 1998, when they adopted a play-off structure for the championship. Between 1998 and 2002 no trophy was awarded for coming top of the league in the regular season, and it would not be until the 2003 season when the League Leaders' Shield was first awarded.

From 2015 to 2017, League Leaders' Shield winners would participate in the short lived World Club Series. 2015 also saw the prize money increase from £50,000 to £100,000.

In 2016, the League Leaders were awarded medals for the first time.

== Shield winners ==
Year	League leaders	Pts	Runners up	Pts
2003	Bradford Bulls (C)	44	Leeds Rhinos	41
2004	Leeds Rhinos (C)	50	Bradford Bulls	41
2005	St. Helens	47	Leeds Rhinos	44
2006	St. Helens (C)	48	Hull F.C.	40
2007	St. Helens	38	Leeds Rhinos (C)	37
2008	St. Helens	43	Leeds Rhinos (C)	42
2009	Leeds Rhinos (C)	42	St Helens	38
2010	Wigan Warriors (C)	44	St Helens	40
2011	Warrington Wolves	44	Wigan Warriors	43
2012	Wigan Warriors	42	Warrington Wolves	41
2013	Huddersfield Giants	42	Warrington Wolves	41
2014	St. Helens (C)	38	Wigan Warriors	37
2015	Leeds Rhinos (C)	41	Wigan Warriors	41
2016	Warrington Wolves	43	Wigan Warriors (C)	42
2017	Castleford Tigers	50	Leeds Rhinos (C)	40
2018	St. Helens	42	Wigan Warriors (C)	32
2019	St. Helens (C)	52	Wigan Warriors	36
2020	Wigan Warriors	76.47^{a}	St. Helens (C)	70.59^{a}
2021	Catalans Dragons	82.61^{a}	St. Helens (C)	76.19^{a}
2022	St. Helens (C)	42	Wigan Warriors	38
2023	Wigan Warriors (C)	40	Catalans Dragons	40
2024	Wigan Warriors (C)	44	Hull KR	42
2025	Hull Kingston Rovers (C)	44	Wigan Warriors	42
2026	Wigan Warriors	44	Leeds Rhinos	40

- ^{a}: Shield winners decided by win percentage rather than points

(C) - Team also won the Grand Final to be crowned champions.

=== Winners ===
Club	Wins	Winning years
St. Helens	8	2005, 2006, 2007, 2008, 2014, 2018, 2019, 2022
Wigan Warriors	6	2010, 2012, 2020, 2023, 2024, 2026
Leeds Rhinos	3	2004, 2009, 2015
Warrington Wolves	2	2011, 2016
Bradford Bulls	1	2003
Huddersfield Giants	1	2013
Castleford Tigers	1	2017
Catalans Dragons	1	2021
Hull Kingston Rovers	1	2025

=== The Treble ===
	Club	Wins	Winning years
1	Wigan Warriors	4	1991–92, 1993–94, 1994–95, 2024
2	Huddersfield Giants	2	1912–13, 1914–15
2	St. Helens	2	1965–66, 2006
4	Swinton Lions	1	1927–28
4	Bradford Bulls	1	2003
4	Leeds Rhinos	1	2015
4	Hull Kingston Rovers	1	2025

=== The Quadruple ===
	Club	Wins	Winning years
1	Wigan Warriors	2 (Note: Wigan have a widely misreported quadruple in 1994–95, with the club winning the treble in addition to the 1994–95 Regal Trophy. Note: No World Club Challenge was held in 1995 as it did not become a regular competition until 2000.)	1993–94, 2024 (Note: This is the first widely reported quadruple to include the calendar year's World Club Challenge and not the following season's. Note: The 2025 World Club Challenge was abandoned by Penrith Panthers, although no title was awarded for 2025, Wigan, without challenge, retained their title for a second year.)
2	Bradford Bulls	1	2003
2	St. Helens	1	2006
2	Hull Kingston Rovers	1	2026

== See also ==
- List of British rugby league champions
- List of British rugby league league leaders
- Championship Leaders' Shield
- Super League Grand Final
- Minor premiership - Australian equivalent
