= Albert Ramsden =

NZ rugby union & league footballer

Personal information
- Born: New Zealand

Playing information

Rugby union
- Position: Halfback
Club
Years	Team	Pld	T	G	FG	P
	Wellington

Rugby league
- Position: Centre, Stand-off
Club
Years	Team	Pld	T	G	FG	P
1907–08	Hunslet	4
	Bradford
	Total	4	0	0	0	0

Albert Ramsden was a New Zealand rugby footballer who played rugby league professionally for Hunslet and Bradford Northern.

== Playing career ==
Ramsden originally played rugby union in New Zealand, scoring the match winning try in 1905 for Wellington against the departing The Original All Blacks side.

Ramsden left New Zealand for the north of England in April 1907 to gain first-hand management experience from an uncle in the mills. In England he was sought after by clubs from the Northern Rugby Football Union and he signed a four-year contract to play rugby league with Hunslet.

Ramsden made his début for Hunslet on Saturday 7 September 1907. Hunslet went on to win the Challenge Cup, Championship, Yorkshire Cup and Yorkshire League that year, however Ramsden found it difficult to hold down a first grade place. He missed selection for the match against the 1907-08 All Golds.
