= 1907–08 Challenge Cup =

By the Northern Rugby Football Union

1908 Challenge Cup
- Duration: 5 rounds
- Number of teams: 32
- Highest attendance: 18,000
- Winners: Hunslet
- Runners-up: Hull F.C.

The 1908 Challenge Cup was the 12th staging of rugby league's oldest knockout competition, the Challenge Cup. Run by the Northern Rugby Football Union, 32 teams took part between 29 February and 25 April 1908. Hunslet won the competition after defeating Hull F.C. in the final.

== Calendar ==
The 32 team knockout tournament was held over five rounds.

Round	Date
Round One	Saturday, 29 February 1908
Round One replay	Wednesday, 4 March 1908
Round Two	Saturday, 14 March 1908
Round Three	Saturday, 28 March 1908
Semifinals	Saturday, 11 April 1908
Final	Saturday, 25 April 1908

== First round ==
Date	Team one	Score one	Team two	Score two
Saturday, 29 February 1908	Barrow	28	Millom	5
Saturday, 29 February 1908	Batley	32	Barrow St.George's	5
Saturday, 29 February 1908	Beverley	3	Merthyr	15
Saturday, 29 February 1908	Dewsbury	2	Oldham	13
Saturday, 29 February 1908	Half-Acre	2	York	7
Saturday, 29 February 1908	Huddersfield	3	Broughton Rangers	8
Saturday, 29 February 1908	Hull FC	9	Swinton	5
Saturday, 29 February 1908	Leeds	5	Hunslet	14
Saturday, 29 February 1908	Leigh	18	Bradford Northern	3
Saturday, 29 February 1908	Runcorn	12	Keighley	5
Saturday, 29 February 1908	Salford	15	Widnes	2
Saturday, 29 February 1908	Wakefield Trinity	19	Hull Kingston Rovers	3
Saturday, 29 February 1908	Warrington	11	Halifax	7
Saturday, 29 February 1908	Whitehaven Recs	13	St Helens	8
Saturday, 29 February 1908	Wigan Highfield	3	Bramley	3
Saturday, 29 February 1908	Wigan	20	Rochdale Hornets	3
Wednesday, 4 March 1908	Bramley	8	Wigan Highfield	6

== Second round ==
Date	Team one	Score one	Team two	Score two
Saturday, 14 March 1908	Barrow	41	Bramley	3
Saturday, 14 March 1908	Batley	4	Wakefield Trinity	8
Saturday, 14 March 1908	Broughton Rangers	18	Wigan	6
Saturday, 14 March 1908	Hull FC	15	Salford	9
Saturday, 14 March 1908	Hunslet	15	Oldham	8
Saturday, 14 March 1908	Leigh	16	York	11
Saturday, 14 March 1908	Merthyr	33	Whitehaven Recs	5
Saturday, 14 March 1908	Runcorn	2	Warrington	6

== Quarterfinals ==
Date	Team one	Score one	Team two	Score two
Saturday, 28 March 1908	Barrow	0	Hunslet	8
Saturday, 28 March 1908	Broughton Rangers	7	Warrington	2
Saturday, 28 March 1908	Hull FC	19	Wakefield Trinity	0
Saturday, 28 March 1908	Leigh	8	Merthyr	2

== Semifinals ==
Date	Team one	Score one	Team two	Score two
11 April 1908	Broughton Rangers	2	Hunslet	16
11 April 1908	Hull FC	7	Leigh	0

== Final ==
The final was contested by Hunslet and Hull F.C. at Fartown in Huddersfield.

The final was played on Saturday 25 April 1908, where Hunslet beat Hull F.C. 14-0 at Fartown in front of a crowd of 18,000.

Hunslet's 14-0 in the final to win their first Cup in their first final.

25 April 1908

Hunslet	14 – 0	Hull
Try: Smith, Farrar; Goal: Eagers, A. Goldthorpe (3)	Report

Fartown, Huddersfield
Attendance: 18,000

Teams:

Hunslet: Herbert Place, Fred Farrar, Billy Eagers, Walter Goldthorpe, Billy Batten, Albert Goldthorpe, Fred Smith, Harry Wilson, Bill Brookes, Bill Jukes, John "Jack" Randall, John Higson, Tom Walsh

Hull: Harry Taylor, L. Parry, G. T. Cottrell, F. J. Cook, (E. or Ned) Rogers, Harry Wallace, Billie Anderson, Tom Herridge, J. Owen, W. J. Carroll, G. Kilburn, H. Fulton, William Holder
