= Cliff Williams (rugby, born 1939) =

Welsh rugby league and union footballer

Clifford Williams
Personal information
- Full name: Clifford G. Williams
- Born: 27 May 1939 Abercarn, Wales
- Died: 2 February 2014 (aged 74) Leeds, England

Playing information

Rugby union
- Position: Scrum-half
Club
Years	Team	Pld	T	G	FG	P
≤1965–≤65	Hafodyrynys RFC
≤1965–65	Cross Keys RFC	111	16
1965–66	Newport RFC	31	5
	Total	142	21	0	0	0
Representative
Years	Team	Pld	T	G	FG	P
1965	Crawshays RFC	≥1
≤1966–66	Monmouthshire County RFC	≥1

Rugby league
- Position: Scrum-half
Club
Years	Team	Pld	T	G	FG	P
1966–70	Hunslet	103	13	2	0	43
1970–71	Swinton	16	0	0	0	0
1972–≥74	Batley
	Total	119	13	2	0	43
Representative
Years	Team	Pld	T	G	FG	P
1970	Wales	1

Clifford G. Williams (27 May 1939 – 2 February 2014) was a Welsh rugby union, and professional rugby league footballer who played in the 1960s and 1970s. He played representative level rugby union (RU) for Monmouthshire County RFC, at invitational level for Crawshays RFC, and at for club level Hafodyrynys RFC, Cross Keys RFC (captain), and Newport RFC, as a scrum-half, and representative level rugby league (RL) for Wales, and at club level for Hunslet, Batley, and Swinton, as a scrum-half.

== Background ==
Cliff Williams was born in Abercarn, Wales. He was one of two children. He died aged 74 in Leeds, West Yorkshire. His funeral took place at Lawnswood Cemetery, Leeds, and he is buried in his Hunslet team blazer in grave number 7 (coincidentally his shirt number in rugby league) at Whinmoor Cemetery, Leeds.

== Playing career ==
=== Rugby union ===
Cliff Williams was signed by Newport RFC as a replacement for Bob Prosser (who had joined rugby league club St. Helens). Williams made his début for Newport RFC against Wasps RFC on Saturday 23 October 1965.

Cliff Williams played for Monmouthshire County RFC (RU) during 1966, his final game of rugby union was the victory over Glamorgan County RFC.

Cliff Williams played for Crawshays RFC (RU) during 1965.

=== Rugby league ===
He joined Hunslet on Friday 27 May 1966.

Cliff Williams won a cap for Wales while at Hunslet in 1970.
