= Dick Jones (rugby, born 1920) =

Wales dual-code international rugby footballer

Personal information
- Full name: Richard William Thomas Jones (Note: Jones's forename is stated as Robert in some sources)
- Born: 24 November 1920 Wales
- Died: unknown

Playing information
- Weight: 14 st 4 lb (91 kg)

Rugby union
Club
Years	Team	Pld	T	G	FG	P
	Aberavon RFC
Representative
Years	Team	Pld	T	G	FG	P
	Glamorgan County RFC
	Wales XV

Rugby league
- Position: Prop, Second-row
Club
Years	Team	Pld	T	G	FG	P
1947–48	Swinton	41	8	2	0	28
1948–49	St Helens	25	2			6
1949–51	Hunslet
1951–52	Doncaster
	Bramley
	Total	66	10	2	0	34
Representative
Years	Team	Pld	T	G	FG	P
1947–49	Wales	3

Richard William Thomas Jones (24 November 1920 – death unknown) was a Welsh rugby union, and professional rugby league footballer who played in the 1940s. He played representative level rugby union (RU) for Wales XV and Glamorgan County RFC, and at club level for Aberavon RFC, and representative level rugby league (RL) for Wales, and at club level for Swinton, St. Helens and Hunslet, as a prop or second-row.

== Club career ==
Jones started his career in rugby union with Aberavon RFC. He switched to rugby league in 1947, joining Swinton after a successful trial. He transferred to St Helens a year later before joining Hunslet in 1949.

He also went on to play for Doncaster and Bramley.

== International honours ==
Jones represented Wales XV in rugby union while at Aberavon RFC in the 'Victory International' non-Test matches between December 1945 and April 1946.

In rugby league, he won three caps for Wales between 1947 and 1949 while at Swinton and St. Helens.
