= Phil Morgan (rugby league) =

Wales international rugby league footballer

Philip Morgan
Personal information
- Full name: Philip Morgan
- Born: 29 February 1944 (age 82) Newport, Wales

Playing information
- Position: Stand-off
Club
Years	Team	Pld	T	G	FG	P
1967–70	Hunslet	61	14	6	0	54
Representative
Years	Team	Pld	T	G	FG	P
1969–70	Wales	5	1	0	0	3

Philip Morgan (born 29 February 1944) is a Welsh former professional rugby league footballer who played in the 1960s and 1970s. He played at representative level for Wales, and at club level for Hunslet, as a stand-off.

== Background ==
Phil Morgan was born in Newport, Wales.

== International honours ==
Phil Morgan won caps for Wales while at Hunslet in 1969 against France, England, and France, and in 1970 against France, and England, 1969...1970 4-caps + 1 (interchange/substitute).
