= Tommy Grey =

Wales international rugby league union & footballer

Personal information
- Full name: Thomas H. Grey
- Born: c. 1884; Wales
- Died: 3 January 1915 (aged 31)

Playing information

Rugby union
Club
Years	Team	Pld	T	G	FG	P
1904–06	Swansea RFC

Rugby league
- Position: Stand-off, Scrum-half
Club
Years	Team	Pld	T	G	FG	P
1906–09	Halifax	105	14	1	0	44
1909–13	Huddersfield
	Total	105	14	1	0	44
Representative
Years	Team	Pld	T	G	FG	P
1911–12	Wales	3	0	0	0	0

Thomas H. Grey (c. 1884 – 3 January 1915) was a Welsh rugby union and professional rugby league footballer who played in the 1900s and 1910s. He played club level rugby union (RU) for Swansea RFC, as a halfback, and representative level rugby league (RL) for Wales, and at club level for Halifax and Huddersfield, as a stand-off or scrum-half.

== Playing career ==
=== International honours ===
Tommy Grey won 3 caps for Wales (RL) in 1911–1912 while at Huddersfield.

=== County Cup Final appearances ===
Tommy Grey played scrum-half in Huddersfield's 2–8 defeat by Wakefield Trinity in the 1910 Yorkshire Cup Final during the 1910–11 season at Headingley, Leeds on Saturday 3 December 1910, and played scrum-half, and scored a try and two goals in the 22–10 victory over Hull Kingston Rovers in the 1911 Yorkshire Cup Final during the 1911–12 season at Belle Vue, Wakefield on Saturday 25 November 1911.

=== County Cup Final appearances ===
Tommy Grey was transferred from Halifax to Huddersfield on 22 December 1909.
