= Albert Goldthorpe =

English rugby footballer

Personal information
- Full name: Albert Edward Goldthorpe
- Born: 3 November 1871 Hunslet, Leeds, West Riding of Yorkshire
- Died: 8 January 1943 (aged 71) Leeds, West Riding of Yorkshire

Playing information

Rugby union
- Position: Fullback
Club
Years	Team	Pld	T	G	FG	P
1888–95	Hunslet

Rugby league
- Position: Stand-off, Fullback
Club
Years	Team	Pld	T	G	FG	P
1895–1910	Hunslet	466	46	672	12	1548
Representative
Years	Team	Pld	T	G	FG	P
1896–1903	Yorkshire	6	1	2	0	7

Albert Edward Goldthorpe (3 November 1871 – 8 January 1943) was an English rugby footballer from the period around 1895's schism in English rugby, which led to the formation of rugby league football around the turn of the century.

== Career ==
One of five brothers (four of whom at one period played together in the same Hunslet team), Goldthorpe made his first team début with Hunslet, at fullback, as a 16-year-old in October, 1888. He went on to become one of the best known figures in English rugby, both before and after the split, and he was one of the finest individual talents in the game at the time of the Northern Union's formation in 1895. He was also a successful cricketer, captaining the team for several years.

Goldthorpe was still playing for Hunslet twenty years after his debut, when in the 1907-08 season he led the club to unprecedented success, winning all four cups (the Challenge Cup, the Championship, the Yorkshire Cup and the Yorkshire League). Hunslet were the first team to achieve that feat.

Albert Goldthorpe played stand-off in Hunslet's 14-0 victory over Hull F.C. in the 1907–08 Challenge Cup Final during the 1907–08 season at Fartown Ground, Huddersfield on Saturday 25 April 1908, in front of a crowd of 18,000.

Albert Goldthorpe played stand-off in Hunslet's 13-3 victory over Halifax in the 1905–06 Yorkshire Cup Final during the 1905–06 season at Park Avenue, Bradford on Saturday 2 December 1905, and played scrum-half, and scored 3-drop goals in the 17-0 victory over Halifax in the 1907–08 Yorkshire Cup Final during the 1907–08 season at Headingley, Leeds on Saturday 21 December 1907.

When he finally retired in 1910, Goldthorpe had scored more goals and points than any player in the game's history at that time. He had played at least 713 games for Hunslet, scoring over 80 tries and kicking over 1000 goals. After his playing career ended he served on the Hunslet committee until, in 1924, he was appointed as the club's second full-time secretary-manager, a post he held for seven years. He had been a member of the committee from at least 15th Nov, 1895, along with his brother James. Albert farmed Urn Farm on Middleton Road, Belle Isle, Leeds and is buried in Hunslet Cemetery nearby.

== Legacy ==
Goldthorpe died in January 1943, aged 71.

In 1988 an Australian television movie, The First Kangaroos actor Dennis Waterman's villainous depiction of Goldthorpe drew formal complaints from Goldthorpe's granddaughter.

In 2008, the Albert Goldthorpe Medal was created by British rugby league newspaper Rugby Leaguer & League Express to honour the leading players in the Super League.

On 20 August 2009, transport company Arriva Yorkshire honoured 13 rugby league footballers at a ceremony at The Jungle, the home of the Castleford Tigers. A fleet of new buses were named after the 'Arriva Yorkshire Rugby League Dream Team'. Members of the public nominated the best ever rugby league footballers to have played in West Yorkshire, supported by local rugby league journalists; James Deighton from BBC Leeds, and Tim Butcher, editor of Rugby League World. The 'Arriva Yorkshire Rugby League Dream Team' is; Trevor Foster MBE, Neil Fox MBE, Albert Goldthorpe, Alan Hardisty, Stan Kielty, Lewis Jones, Roger Millward MBE, Malcolm Reilly, Garry Schofield, Keith Senior, David Topliss, Dave Valentine and Adrian Vowles.

In 2015, Goldthorpe was inducted into the Rugby League Hall of Fame.
