= 1907–08 Northern Rugby Football Union season =

- League: Championship
- Teams: 27

1907–08 Season
- Champions: Hunslet (1st title)
- League Leaders: Oldham
- Runners-up: Oldham
- Top point-scorer: (England) Albert Goldthorpe ( Hunslet) (217)
- Top try-scorer: (England) Jim Leytham ( Wigan) (44)
- Joined League: Bradford Northern; Merthyr Tydfil; Ebbw Vale
- Resigned from the League: Liverpool City

The 1907–08 Northern Rugby Football Union season was the 13th season of rugby league football.

== Season summary ==
League Champions were Hunslet who beat Oldham 12-2 in a replay after a 7-7 draw. It was the first time a team that did not finish top of the league won the Championship.

Challenge Cup Winners were Hunslet who defeated Hull F.C. 14-0.

Liverpool City were replaced by the two Welsh clubs, Merthyr Tydfil and Ebbw Vale, taking the competition to 27 clubs.

Bradford switched to association football and were replaced by Bradford Northern.

Oldham won the Lancashire League, and Hunslet won the Yorkshire League.

Hunslet won All Four Cups available to them; Challenge Cup, Rugby Football League Championship, Yorkshire league, and Yorkshire Cup.

New Zealand toured England this season. On 28 December 1907, they defeated Salford 9-2 in front of 9,000 spectators.

== Championship ==
	Team	Pld	W	D	L	PF	PA	Pts	Pct
1	Oldham	32	28	2	2	396	121	58	90.62
2	Hunslet	32	25	1	6	389	248	51	79.68
3	Broughton Rangers	30	23	1	6	421	191	47	78.33
4	Wigan	32	23	1	8	501	181	47	73.43
5	Halifax	34	22	1	11	483	275	45	66.17
6	Hull Kingston Rovers	32	21	0	11	460	307	42	65.62
7	Warrington	30	18	3	9	431	156	39	65.00
8	Wakefield Trinity	32	20	1	11	422	322	41	64.06
9	Salford	32	19	3	10	344	187	41	64.06
10	Batley	32	20	0	12	360	306	40	62.05
11	Keighley	32	17	1	14	320	356	35	54.68
12	Bradford Northern	32	17	0	15	313	350	34	53.12
13	Runcorn	30	15	0	15	255	219	30	50.00
14	Barrow	32	15	0	17	244	272	30	46.87
15	Huddersfield	32	14	1	17	439	330	29	45.31
16	Hull	34	15	0	19	349	323	30	44.11
17	Rochdale Hornets	30	13	0	17	232	290	26	43.33
18	Dewsbury	32	13	1	18	290	358	27	42.18
19	Leigh	30	11	1	18	279	362	23	38.33
20	Leeds	32	10	1	21	270	397	21	32.81
21	Swinton	30	9	1	20	180	316	19	31.66
22	York	30	9	0	21	284	437	18	30.00
23	Merthyr Tydfil	30	8	1	21	229	400	17	28.33
24	Widnes	30	6	4	20	179	335	16	26.66
25	St. Helens	32	7	3	22	228	500	17	26.56
26	Ebbw Vale	30	6	2	22	153	426	14	23.33
27	Bramley	32	5	1	26	188	674	11	17.18

Play-offs

== Championship play-off ==
Semi-finals
2	Hunslet	28
3	Broughton Rangers	3
1	Oldham	12
4	Wigan	5

Championship final
Hunslet	7	12
Oldham	7	2

== Challenge Cup ==
The final saw Hunslet's 14-0 victory over Hull F.C. in the 1908 Challenge Cup Final during the 1907–08 season at Fartown Ground, Huddersfield on Saturday 25 April 1908, in front of a crowd of 18,000, the referee was Mr. J. H. Smith of Widnes, and the Challenge Cup Trophy was presented by Mr H. Ashton (President of the Northern Union).

Hunslet Tries: Fred Smith, Fred Farrar

Hunslet Goals: Billy Eagers, (Albert, or Walter) Goldthorpe 3

Half-time: 7-0

Attendance: 18,000 (at Fartown Ground, Huddersfield)

Teams:

Hunslet: Herbert Place, Fred Farrar, Billy Eagers, Walter Goldthorpe, Billy Batten, Albert Goldthorpe, Fred Smith, Harry Wilson, Bill Brookes, Bill Jukes, John "Jack" Randall, John Higson, Tom Walsh

Hull FC: Harry Taylor, L. Parry, G. T. Cottrell, F. J. Cook, (E. or Ned) Rogers, Harry Wallace, Billie Anderson, Tom Herridge, J. Owen, W. J. Carroll, G. Kilburn, H. Fulton, William Holder

== County cups ==
Oldham beat Broughton Rangers 16–9 to win the Lancashire Cup, and Hunslet beat Halifax 17–0 to win the Yorkshire Cup.

== Sources ==
- 1907-08 Rugby Football League season at wigan.rlfans.com
- The Challenge Cup at The Rugby Football League website
