= Billy Batten =

GB & England international rugby league footballer

Personal information
- Full name: William Batten
- Born: 26 May 1889 Kinsley, Wakefield, England
- Died: 26 January 1959 (aged 69) Wakefield, England

Playing information
- Height: 5 ft 10 1/2 in (179 cm)
- Weight: 13 st 4 lb (84 kg)
- Position: Fullback, Wing, Centre
Club
Years	Team	Pld	T	G	FG	P
1907–13	Hunslet	169	96	65	0	418
1913–24	Hull FC	226	89	1	0	269
1924–26	Wakefield Trinity	79	6	2	0	22
1927	Castleford	8	1	0	0	3
	Total	482	192	68	0	712
Representative
Years	Team	Pld	T	G	FG	P
1908–21	Great Britain	10	3	0	0	9
1908–23	England	15	3	1	0	11
1908–26	Yorkshire	19	7	3	0	27
- Relatives: Eric Batten (son); Ray Batten (grandson); Stan Smith (nephew)

William Batten (26 May 1889 – 26 January 1959) was an English professional rugby league footballer who played in the 1900s, 1910s and 1920s. He played at representative level for Great Britain, England and Yorkshire, and at club level for Hunslet, Hull FC, Wakefield Trinity, and Castleford, as a fullback, wing, or centre. He is noted as one of the greatest of his era, one of the game's first superstars, Batten was a brilliant athlete and a huge crowd-puller – and also well aware of his own worth. In 1988 he became one of the inaugural inductees of the Rugby Football League Hall of Fame. Batten is also a member of the Hull FC, and Wakefield Trinity halls of fame.

== Early life ==
Batten was born on 26 May 1889 in the mining village of Kinsley, near Fitzwilliam, in the West Riding of Yorkshire, England. His parents were James and Ann Batten, who both migrated to Yorkshire from North Wales. Batten started his rugby career with Kinsley and Ackworth United before joining Hunslet at the age of 17.

== Professional playing career ==
=== Hunslet ===
Batten made his début for Hunslet in February 1907 in a 15–0 victory over Barrow. He helped the club win All Four Cups in 1907–08.

Batten was known for his trademark "Batten Leap" – his ability to hurdle players. He passed this trick on to his son Eric Batten, but the tactic was later outlawed because of its potential dangers.

Billy Batten played on the wing in Hunslet's 14–0 victory over Hull F.C. in the 1907–08 Challenge Cup Final during the 1907–08 season at Fartown Ground, Huddersfield on Saturday 25 April 1908, in front of a crowd of 18,000.

Billy Batten played fullback in Hunslet's 17–0 victory over Halifax in the 1907–08 Yorkshire Cup Final during the 1907–08 season at Headingley, Leeds on Saturday 21 December 1907.

During his time at Hunslet, Batten was offered £4 a week to sign for Manchester United.

=== Hull FC ===
He joined Hull FC for a then record fee of £600 in April 1913 (based on increases in average earnings, this would be approximately £205,400 in 2013), and was to be paid £14 per match (in contrast to the £4 a week he had been offered to sign for Manchester United), a huge sum at the time (based on increases in average earnings, this would be approximately £4,794 in 2013), plus an additional special bonus. These were huge figures at the time and made Batten possibly the highest-paid professional footballer in Britain, if not the world. He helped the club win the Challenge Cup in his first season, when his presence in the side reportedly added £500 to gate receipts per game. Such was his popularity that Hull F.C. would print "Batten certain to play" over posters advertising their home games at the Boulevard.

Batten played at centre in Hull FC's 6–0 victory over Wakefield Trinity in the 1913–14 Challenge Cup Final during the 1913–14 season at Thrum Hall, Halifax, in front of a crowd of 19,000, played at centre and scored a try in the 9–10 defeat by Rochdale Hornets in the 1921–22 Challenge Cup Final during the 1921–22 season at Headingley, Leeds, in front of a crowd of 34,827.

His benefit match in 1920 reaped an incredible £1,079 13s 8d. (based on increases in average earnings, this would be approximately £112,700 in 2013). To put that in context Alex Murphy, one of the game's true legends, raised approximately £2,000 in his "phenomenally successful testimonial year" almost 50 years later (based on increases in average earnings, this would be approximately £61,970 in 2013). He was transferred to Wakefield in May 1924 for £350.

=== Wakefield Trinity ===
Batten signed for Wakefield Trinity in May 1924, he made his début during August 1924, playing in 79 games over the next couple of years, scoring six tries and kicking two goals. Billy Batten played at centre in Wakefield Trinity's 9–8 victory over Batley in the 1924–25 Yorkshire Cup Final during the 1924–25 season at Headingley, Leeds on Saturday 22 November 1924, and played at centre in the 3–10 defeat by Huddersfield in the 1926–27 Yorkshire Cup Final during the 1926–27 season at Headingley, Leeds on Wednesday 1 December 1926. He also continued his representative rugby career, playing for Yorkshire on four occasions. He stayed at Wakefield Trinity for two seasons before moving to Castleford in January 1927.

=== Castleford ===
Batten played in Castleford's inaugural 1926–27 season.

=== International career ===
Batten was selected to play for Great Britain during the 1908–09 Kangaroo tour of Great Britain. Batten was also a member of the first British touring team to travel to Australasia under the leadership of James Lomas in 1910. He was selected to play during the tour against Australia (2 matches), Australasia (2 matches), and New Zealand.

Batten was selected to play for Great Britain during the 1911-12 Kangaroo tour of Great Britain. Altogether, Batten won caps for England while at Hunslet in 1908 against Wales (2 matches), in 1908–09 against Australia (3 matches), Wales, in 1910 against Wales, in 1911–12 against Australia (2 matches), in 1912 against Wales, in 1913 against Wales. He also won caps for Great Britain while at Hunslet in 1908 against New Zealand, and Australia, in 1909 against Australia (2 matches).

Batten declined the opportunity to tour again with Britain in 1914 for "business reasons".

Batten won caps for England while at Hull in 1921 against Wales, and Other Nationalities, in 1922 against Wales, in 1923 against Wales.

== Personal life ==
Batten had two brothers who were also famous players and the Batten dynasty continued with his three sons (Eric Batten, Billy Batten Jr. and Bob Batten) who all played at the top level, with Eric appearing in a record eight Challenge Cup Finals. Billy Batten, Jr.'s son, the rugby league footballer Ray Batten, he was also the uncle of the rugby league footballer Stan Smith.

== Notes ==
Achievements
Preceded by James Lomas	Rugby league transfer record Hunslet to Hull F.C. 1913–1921	Succeeded by Harold Buck
