= 1905–06 Northern Rugby Football Union season =

- League: Championship
- Teams: 31

1905–06 Season
- Champions: Leigh (1st title)
- Runners-up: Hunslet
- Top point-scorer: (England) Jim Leytham (Wigan) (160)
- Top try-scorer: (England) Jim Leytham (Wigan) (44)

The 1905–06 Northern Rugby Football Union season was the 11th season of rugby league football.

== Season summary ==
Leigh won the Championship for the first time this season and Bradford their first Challenge Cup.

The two divisions were combined into one competition, with Lancaster dropping out to reduce it to 31 teams. Clubs from the same county all played each other, and arranged inter-county matches as and when they could. Because not all clubs played the same number of matches positions were decided on percentages.

Featherstone Rovers, who were an amateur team at this time knocked a professional side out of the Challenge Cup, when they beat Widnes 23-2 in the second round.

There was no county league competition this season.

== Championship ==
Pos	Team	Pld	W	D	L	PF	PA	PAv	Pts
1	Leigh (C)	30	23	2	5	245	130	1.885	48
2	Hunslet	32	25	0	7	370	148	2.500	50
3	Leeds	34	25	2	7	377	123	3.065	52
4	Oldham	40	28	2	10	446	125	3.568	58
5	Keighley	28	19	1	8	255	164	1.555	39
6	Wigan	34	22	1	11	441	167	2.641	45
7	Hull Kingston Rovers	36	22	3	11	246	218	1.128	47
8	Broughton Rangers	34	21	1	12	400	222	1.802	43
9	Halifax	38	20	8	10	261	232	1.125	48
10	Runcorn	30	17	3	10	264	136	1.941	37
11	Huddersfield	30	17	2	11	224	174	1.287	36
12	Bradford	34	19	2	13	371	199	1.864	40
13	Swinton	32	17	3	12	203	168	1.208	37
14	St. Helens	30	16	1	13	244	212	1.151	33
15	Warrington	38	19	3	16	270	184	1.467	41
16	Wakefield Trinity	32	13	4	15	188	262	0.718	30
17	Hull F.C.	36	16	1	19	304	220	1.382	33
18	Salford	34	14	3	17	272	270	1.007	31
19	Pontefract	28	11	1	16	211	196	1.077	23
20	Batley	34	11	5	18	173	215	0.805	27
21	Widnes	28	10	2	16	129	242	0.533	22
22	Dewsbury	36	13	2	21	162	252	0.643	28
23	Bramley	26	9	2	15	126	246	0.512	20
24	York	34	11	2	21	170	249	0.683	24
25	Barrow	32	9	4	19	138	324	0.426	22
26	Normanton	24	4	2	18	50	280	0.179	10
27	Millom	20	3	2	15	77	328	0.235	8
28	Castleford	20	3	2	15	45	325	0.138	8
29	Rochdale Hornets	32	3	6	23	105	327	0.321	12
30	Morecambe	26	2	4	20	99	282	0.351	8
31	Brighouse Rangers	26	3	2	21	87	333	0.261	8

Updated to match(es) played on unknown. Source:
Rules for classification: 1) Points; 2) Points difference; 3) Points scored
(C) Champions

== Challenge Cup ==
Bradford beat Salford 5-0 in the final at Leeds before a crowd of 15,834 to win the Cup in their first appearance in the final.

== County cups ==
The inaugural Rugby league county cups took place this season, and Wigan beat Leigh 0–0 (replay 8–0) to win the Lancashire Cup, and Hunslet beat Halifax 13–3 to win the Yorkshire County Cup.

== Sources ==
- 1905-06 Rugby Football League season at wigan.rlfans.com
- The Challenge Cup at The Rugby Football League website
