= Hunslet F.C. (1883) =

Defunct English rugby league club, based in Hunslet, Yorkshire, England

Club information
- Full name: Hunslet Football Club
- Nickname: The Parksiders
- Founded: 1883; 143 years ago
- Exited: 1973; 53 years ago

Former details
- Ground: Parkside

Records
- Champions: 2 (1907–1908, 1937–1938)
- Challenge Cups: 2 (1907–1908, 1933–1934)
- Yorkshire League: 3 (1897–98, 1907–08, 1931–32)

Hunslet F.C. was a professional rugby league club based in Hunslet, Leeds, West Yorkshire, England. The club was a founding member of the Rugby Football League in 1895.

Hunslet were a strong force in the early years of the Northern Union, winning the League Championship and Challenge Cup twice. Their greatest achievement was winning All Four Cups in 1908.

The club played home games at Parkside and had a cross city rivalry with Leeds. After the club disbanded in 1973 a new club; New Hunslet was formed.

== History ==
=== 1883-1900: Foundation and early years ===
A special general meeting of the Hunslet Cricket Club was held on 21 May 1883, the committee resolved to grant two local teams: Albion and Excelsior the sum of £130 to form the Hunslet Rugby Club at Woodhouse Hill. The name of the cricket club was also changed to Hunslet Cricket and Football Club. The players initially wore blue and white quartered shirts. The new club played their first match on 6 October 1883, beating Hull "A". In December, another side, Imperial, amalgamated with them. In 1884, Hunslet entered the Yorkshire Cup. They also changed their strip to chocolate and white, and built a stand.

Hunslet announced their arrival the following season by beating Leeds St John's (later to become Leeds RLFC) in the third round of the Yorkshire County Cup. Better fixtures drew larger crowds and as a result the landlord wanted to put up the rent. The search was on for another ground, club officials purchased at little cost 10.25 acres (41,500 m^{2}) of waste land at Hunslet Carr from the Low Moor Iron and Coal Company and had to shift 2,000 tons of rubbish to create what would become Parkside, which they moved to in 1888. The first game at Parkside was played on 11 February 1888, when they played and beat Mirfield. Just four seasons later Hunslet won their first trophy, the Yorkshire Cup, beating Leeds.

The city of Leeds had an abundance of rugby football clubs and although members of the Yorkshire RFU (which was in turn a Constituent Body of the RFU), it was decided to form a 'more local' association. It was for this reason that the Leeds & District organisation was formalised when a meeting took place at the Green Dragon Hotel, Leeds, on 27 September 1888. The foundation clubs were Bramley, Holbeck, Hunslet, Kirkstall, Leeds Parish Church, Leeds St John's (later to become Leeds), and Wortley.

After the 1890-91 season, Hunslet along with other Yorkshire Senior clubs Batley, Bradford, Brighouse, Dewsbury, Halifax, Huddersfield, Hull, Leeds, Liversedge, Manningham and Wakefield decided that they wanted their own county league starting in 1891 along the lines of a similar competition that had been played in Lancashire. The clubs wanted full control of the league but the Yorkshire Rugby Football Union would not sanction the competition as it meant giving up control of rugby football to the senior clubs.

In 1895, Hunslet were one of the twenty-one clubs that broke away from the Rugby Football Union, and joined the Northern Union. In 1897–98 Hunslet became Yorkshire Senior League Champions, and in the following season they reached the final of the Challenge Cup, going down 19–9 to Oldham.

=== 1901-1920: All Four Cups ===
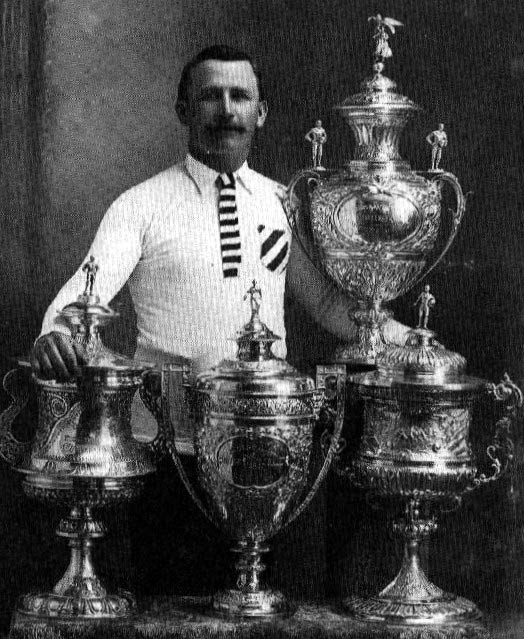
Hunslet captain, Albert Goldthorpe, posing with "All Four Cups" in 1908

Billy Batten signed for Hunslet as a 17-year-old in 1905. In the 1905–06 Northern Rugby Football Union season, Hunslet won the first ever Yorkshire Cup, beating Halifax, 13–3. They were the first club to win All Four Cups, which they did in the 1907–08 season. Oldham had finished as league leaders but Hunslet beat them 12-2 in the Championship Final following an initial 7-7 draw. They changed their colours to chocolate and white after this feat. Powered by a pack known as the Terrible Six, Hunslet were led by Albert Goldthorpe, already in his late thirties but a dominant figure in the early years of the code. Many players left Parkside following this success either being transferred to other clubs or going into retirement.

After a dispute about pay, Billy Batten was transferred to Hull in 1912. He was transferred to Hull F.C. for the then record sum of £600. 1912 also say the introduction of the Lazenby Cup, awarded to the winner of an annual friendly against Leeds. In 1921, Harold Buck became the game's first £1,000 transfer when he moved from Hunslet to Leeds. According to some sources, the deal included a player in part exchange.

=== 1920-1950 ===
Soon after the First World War Hunslet were at their lowest ever position in the league.

In 1924, the club's record attendance was set at 24,700 for a third round Challenge Cup match.

In 1927, Jack Walkington started a career as player until 1946 then as coach to 1960. In 1927–28 Harry Beverley, Leslie White, James "Jim" Traill, and Billy Thornton joined and prospects improved when they finished 4th in the league that season.

In the remaining years up to the 1930s, Hunslet had rather a lean period, until 1932 when they regained the Yorkshire League Trophy and made it to the final of the Yorkshire Cup. The 1931–32 season saw them win the Yorkshire League.

In the 1920s, the club had played in white jerseys, but the players used to steal them for work. Determined to prevent this happening, the club changed to coloured jerseys in 1932. They could not use the Leeds city colours as rivals Leeds wore those, so Hunslet decided to adopt the University of Leeds colours of myrtle, white and flame-red having been given new kit by the university.

Hunslet celebrated its 50th anniversary in 1933–34. The club did this in some style, beating Widnes at Wembley Stadium in the Challenge Cup Final. They were given a civic reception back in Leeds and toured with the cup.

Hunslet reached the RL Championship Final in 1938 meeting their neighbours Leeds in the only all-Leeds final. The match was played at the Elland Road football ground, to accommodate a huge demand from the city's rugby league supporters. Over 54,000 people watched the game, a then record for a match in England, Hunslet triumphed, 8–2, to take the title for the second time in the club's history.

In the late 1930s the club was doing well and played in front of large crowds. This wave of success was only halted by the Second World War. Hunslet dropped out of the wartime Yorkshire league in 1942–43 but returned to the competition in 1943–44.

=== Post-war ===
Hunslet stopped being a multi-sport members club with sections for bowls, cricket, athletics, social events, and other smaller sections in 1951 and became a limited company. The new status as rugby league club saw a decline in Parkside being used by other sports and other members of the community.

The Parksiders lost the 1956 Yorkshire Cup Final to Wakefield Trinity. Hunslet lost, 44–22, against St. Helens in the 1959 Championship Final at Odsal Stadium, Bradford.

In the late 1950s, Hunslet's fanbase went into decline as post-war slum clearances changed what had been a residential area into an industrial one. Despite this, in 1958, they paid £2,000 for Horace Grainger, making him the most expensive rugby league player of the era.

The team's performances began to decline, reaching a low point in 1961–62 when they finished 25th and were relegated to the new second division. However, player-coach Fred Ward resurrected the team when he joined Hunslet at the start of the 1962–63 season. It was decided that the team never looked that imposing in green and a decision was made to go back to white, this time with two chocolate hoops. In his first season, Hunslet won the Second Division Championship and secured a position in the top division as well as winning the 1962 Yorkshire County Cup Final over Hull Kingston Rovers.

Hunslet lost in the 1965 Yorkshire Cup final against Bradford Northern and that same year reached the semi-final of the Challenge Cup. To avoid going on black and white television against Wakefield Trinity, who also wore hoops in the middle of their jerseys, the club got a strip with a chocolate V. They won the semi-final and went to Wembley with it, stitching green blazer badges to the jerseys. They lost the final narrowly, 20–16, to Wigan. The side were again split up by transfers and retirements. Just two years later in 1967 the dream was over. Attendances continued to decline partly because of further slum clearances and factory closures. The last four home games of 1969–70 attracted attendances of less than 1,000 each. Ward left the club and with that the club entered free fall.

=== 1970-1973: Disbandment ===
On the eve of the 1970–71 season the players were told they were going to have their wages cut, and because they had not had a rise for eight years they went on strike. Under threat of the club being closed the players eventually backed down. However, after one game they again went on strike. Players retired or went on the transfer list and the team dropped down the league.

Parkside's stand was burned down by vandals in 1971. Parkside was then sold off to an industrial developer for around £300,000 in 1972. The last game at Parkside was on 21 April 1973 against York. Parkside was demolished and Hunslet became tenants at the Elland Road Greyhound Stadium. In July 1973 the club announced the winding-up of Hunslet FC because no suitable new location could be found that was financially viable. The £300,000 proceeds of the sale of Parkside were distributed to shareholders.

== Home grounds ==
=== 1883–1888 Woodhouse Hill ===
Hunslet played their first match on 6 October 1883 against Hull 'A'. A stand was built in 1884.

=== 1888–1973: Parkside ===
Hunslet purchased at little cost of waste land at Hunslet Carr from the Low Moor Iron and Coal Company and had to shift 2,000 tons of rubbish to create what would become Parkside, which they moved to in 1888. Parkside's stand was burned down by vandals in 1971. Parkside was sold off to an industrial developer for around £300,000 in 1972. The last game at Parkside was on 21 April 1973 against York. Parkside was demolished and New Hunslet became tenants at the Elland Road Greyhound Stadium.

== Players earning international caps while at Hunslet ==
- Eric Batten won caps for England while at Hunslet in 1938 Wales, in 1939 France, Wales, in 1940 Wales, in 1941 Wales, in 1943 Wales, while at Bradford: in 1944 Wales, in 1945 Wales (2 matches), in 1946 France (2 matches), Wales, in 1947 France, in 1948 France, and won caps for Great Britain while at Bradford in 1946 Australia (2 matches), New Zealand, in 1947 New Zealand
- William "Billy" Batten won caps for England while at Hunslet in 1908 Wales (2 matches), in 1908–09 Australia (3 matches), Wales, in 1910 Wales, in 1911–12 Australia (2 matches), in 1912 Wales, in 1913 Wales, while at Hull F.C. in 1921 Wales, Other Nationalities, in 1922 Wales, in 1923 Wales, and won caps for Great Britain while at Hunslet in 1908 New Zealand, in 1908 Australia (3 matches), in 1910 Australia (2 matches), New Zealand, in 1911 Australia (2 matches), while at Hull F.C. in 1921 Australia
- Harry Beverley won caps for England while at Hunslet in 1935 against Wales, in 1936 against France, in 1937 against France, in 1938 against Wales, and France, and won caps for Great Britain while at Hunslet in 1936 against Australia (3 matches), in 1937 against Australia, and while at Halifax in 1937 against Australia (2 matches).
- Bill Brookes won caps for England while at Hunslet in 1905 against Other Nationalities, and in 1906 against Other Nationalities.
- Alf Burnell won caps for England while at Hunslet in 1950 France, in 1951 Wales, France, in 1952 Wales, and won caps for Great Britain while at Hunslet in 1951 New Zealand (2 matches), in 1954 New Zealand won caps for British Empire XIII while at Hunslet in 1945+ ?-caps
- Arthur Clues won caps for Australia while at Wests, and won caps for Other Nationalities while at Leeds, and Hunslet
- Hector Crowther a won cap for Great Britain while at Hunslet in 1930 against Australia
- John "Jack" Evans won caps for Great Britain while at Hunslet in 1951 New Zealand, in 1952 Australia (3 matches)
- Kenneth "Ken"/"Kenny" Eyre (1965 Challenge Cup Runner-up) won a cap for Great Britain while at Hunslet in 1965 against New Zealand
- Brian Gabbitas won a cap for Great Britain while at Hunslet in 1959 against France
- Geoffrey "Geoff" Gunney (MBE) (1965 Challenge Cup Runner-up) won caps for Great Britain while at? Hunslet in 1954 New Zealand (3 matches), in 1956 Australia, in 1957 France (3 matches), France, New Zealand, in 1964 France, in 1965 France (World Cup in 1957 2-caps)
- Tyssul "Tuss" Griffiths won caps Wales while at Hunslet, and Doncaster in 1946…1951 2-caps
- Dennis Hartley won a cap for England while at Castleford in 1968 against Wales, and won caps for Great Britain while at Hunslet in 1964 against France (2 matches), while at Castleford in 1968 against France, in 1969 against France, in 1970 against Australia (2 matches), New Zealand (2 matches), and in the 1970 Rugby League World Cup against Australia, France and Australia
- John Higson won caps for Great Britain while at Hunslet in 1908 against Australia, and in 1909 against Australia
- Granville James won caps for Wales while at Hunslet in 1950…1953 5-caps
- David "Dai" Jenkins won caps for Wales while at Hunslet in 1927…1932 4-caps
- Albert Jenkinson won caps for England while at Hunslet in 1911 Australia, in 1912 Wales, in 1913 Wales, and won caps for Great Britain while at Hunslet in 1911–12 Australia (2 matches)
- Bill Jukes won caps for England while at Hunslet in 1908 Wales, in 1909 Australia (3 matches), Wales, in 1910 Wales (2 matches), in 1911 Australia (2 matches), and won caps for Great Britain while at Hunslet in 1908–09 Australia (3 matches), in 1910 Australia (2 matches), New Zealand
- Phillip "Phil" Morgan won caps for Wales while at Hunslet in 1969 against France, England, and France, and in 1970 against France, and England, in 1969…1970 4-caps + 1 (sub)
- Cyril Morrell won caps for England while at Hunslet in 1938 France, Wales, in 1939 France
- Oliver Morris won caps for Wales while at Hunslet, and Leeds in 1938…1941 5-caps
- Herbert Place won a cap for England while at Hunslet in 1909 Wales
- Bernard Prior won a cap for Great Britain while at Hunslet in 1966 France
- Bill Ramsey (1965 Challenge Cup Runner-up?) won caps for Great Britain while at Hunslet in 1965 New Zealand (2 matches), in 1966 France, Australia (2 matches), New Zealand (2 matches), while at Leeds in 1974 New Zealand.
- Charles "Charlie" Sage won caps for Wales while at Hunslet in 1925 against England (2-matches)
- Brian Shaw won caps for Great Britain while at Hunslet in 1956 Australia (2 matches), in 1960 France, Australia, France, in 1961 France (World Cup in 1960 2-caps)
- Geoffrey "Geoff" Shelton won caps for Great Britain while at Hunslet in 1964 against France (2 matches), in 1965 against New Zealand (3 matches), and in 1966 against Australia (2 matches)
- Frederick "Fred" Smith won caps for England while at Hunslet in 1909 Wales, in 1910 Wales (2 matches), in 1911 Wales, Australia (2 matches), in 1912 Wales
- Leonard "Len" Smith won caps for England while at Hunslet in 1935 France
- Samuel "Sam" Smith won caps for England while at Hunslet in 1955 Other Nationalities, in 1956 France, and won caps for Great Britain while at Hunslet ?-caps (World Cup in 1954 4-caps)
- Colin Stansfield won a cap for England while at Hunslet in 1945 Wales
- William "Billy" Thornton won caps for England while at Hunslet in 1943 Wales
- Cec Thompson won caps for Great Britain while at Hunslet in 1951 New Zealand (2 matches) won caps for British Empire XIII while at Hunslet in 1952 Wales
- George Todd won caps for England while at Hunslet in 1935 France, Wales, in 1936 Wales
- Charlie Wabo won caps for Papua New Guinea while at Hunslet
- John "Jack" Walkington won caps for England while at Hunslet in 1930 Other Nationalities, in 1931 Wales, in 1938 Wales, in 1944 Wales
- Leslie "Les" White won caps for England while at Hunslet in 1933 Australia, and won caps for Great Britain while at Hunslet in 1932 Australia (3 matches), New Zealand (2 matches), in 1933 Australia (2 matches)
- Clifford "Cliff" Williams won a cap for Wales while at Hunslet in 1970 1-cap
- Leslie "Les" Williams won caps for Wales (RU) while at Llanelli RFC in 1947 against England, Scotland, France, and Ireland, and while at Cardiff RFC in 1947 against Australia, in 1948 against Ireland, and in 1949 against England, and won caps for Wales (RL) while at Hunslet 1949…1953 15-caps
- Richard "Dickie" Williams won caps for Wales while at Leeds 13-caps?, and won caps for Great Britain while at Leeds, while at Hunslet, in 1948…54 12-caps
- Harry Wilson won caps for England while at Hunslet in 1906 Other Nationalities, in 1908 New Zealand, and won caps for Great Britain while at Hunslet in 1908 New Zealand (3 matches)
- Neil Lowe won caps for Scotland while at Hunslet
- Lee Hanlan won caps for Ireland while at Hunslet

== Other notable players ==
These players have either; won Challenge Cup, Rugby Football League Championship, Yorkshire County Cup, Yorkshire League, have received a Testimonial match, were international representatives before, or after, their time at Hunslet, or are notable outside of rugby league.

- Frank Andrews ≥1913
- Edward "Eddie" Bennett c.-1951
- Peter Brown
- Harold Buck c.-1920
- Walter Burnell c.-1951
- Frank 'Dolly' Dawson c.-1925
- Peter Fox
- David Gillespie
- William "Billy" Gilston c.-1890s
- Albert Goldthorpe
- Walter Goldthorpe
- L. E. Greenwood c.-1890s
- Edward "Eddie" Guerin
- Bernard Hepton (Yorkshire Cup winner 1953?), later TV actor famous for playing Albert Foiret in Secret Army
- Vic Hey
- Robert Jones
- William "Billy" Langton (Scored in every match of 1958–59 season) (Testimonial match 1965)
- Barry Lee (1965 Challenge Cup Runner-up)
- William "Bill" Metcalfe (Rugby League War of the Roses circa-1950)
- William "Willie" O'Neill (#2/#5) c.-1946
- Jimmy O'Sullivan 1937–38 Championship winner
- Alan Preece (Testimonial match 1967)
- Albert Ramsden c.1907
- John "Jack" Randall
- Donald "Don" Rees c.-1951
- Sidney "Sid" Rookes born c.-1921
- David "Dave" Smith (#2/#5) c. 1950/60s
- Jeffrey "Jeff" Stevenson
- Arthur Talbot c.-1951
- Thomas "Tosh" Thornton c.-1951
- Harry Toft
- Mark Tolson 1934 Challenge Cup Winner
- James "Jim" Traill Missed 1934 Challenge Cup With Broken Arm Sustained in semi-final (father of Kenneth "Ken" Traill)
- Kenneth "Ken" Traill (son of James "Jim" Traill)
- Frank Wagstaff c.-1935
- Gordon Waite c.-1951
- Fred Ward (1965 Challenge Cup Runner-up and Captain)
- Frederick "Freddie" Williamson c. 1951
- Ernest Winter
- Edgar Wrigley
- Cliff Williams (rugby, born 1939)

== Honours ==
- Rugby Football League Champions: 2
  - 1907-08, 1937–38
- Challenge Cup: 2
  - 1907-08, 1933–34
- League Leaders: 1
  - 1937-38
- Yorkshire Cup: 4
  - 1891-92 (pre-schism), 1905-06, 1907–08, 1962–63
- Yorkshire League: 3
  - 1897-98, 1907–08, 1931–32

== Bibliography ==
- Hawks:facts and history
