= All Four Cups =

British rugby league achievement

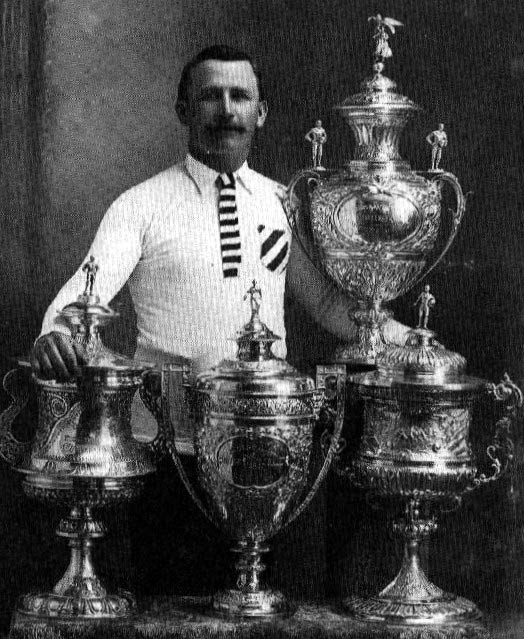
Hunslet captain, Albert Goldthorpe, posing with "All Four Cups" in 1908

Winning All Four Cups referred to winning all four competitions available to a British rugby league side in the top division between 1907 and 1970. The cups available to win were the First Division Championship, Challenge Cup, county league (Lancashire League or Yorkshire League) and county cup (Lancashire Cup or Yorkshire Cup). The feat was achieved on three occasions.

== All Four Cups winners ==
Between 1907 and 1970 there were four trophies available to any British rugby league side:

- Challenge Cup
- RFL First Division
- County league (Lancashire League or Yorkshire League)
- County cup (Lancashire Cup or Yorkshire Cup)

Following the abolition of the county league in 1970, "all four cups" could no longer be won. The county cups were abolished in 1993.

=== Hunslet ===
The first club to win All Four Cups was Hunslet, which they did in the 1907–08 season. They were captained by Albert Goldthorpe, who operated in the back line. Hunslet's forward pack of that season was equally famous, going by the name of "The Terrible Six".

Hunslet did not top the championship table at the end of the season, coming behind Oldham, whom they defeated, 10–12, in a championship replay after the first match was drawn 7 apiece. They ran out 14–0 winners in the Challenge Cup Final in front of 18,000 spectators at Fartown, Huddersfield. They took the Yorkshire Cup by virtue of a 17–0 victory over Halifax.

=== Huddersfield ===
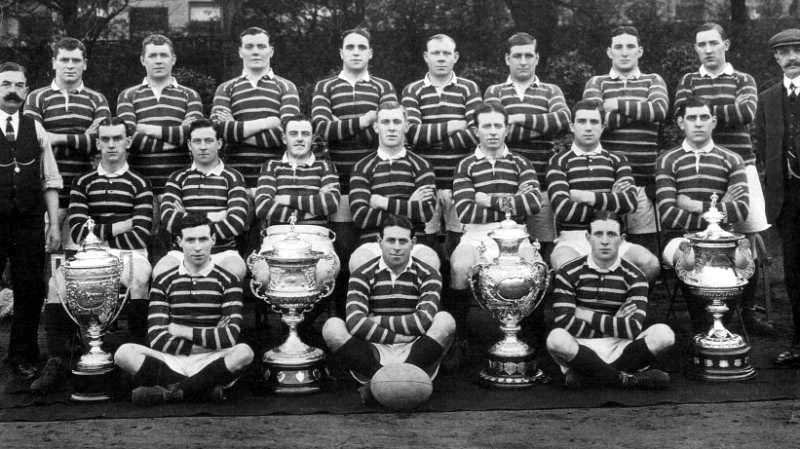
The Huddersfield "Team of all Talents" posing with all four cups in 1915

The feat was next repeated by Huddersfield in the 1914–15 season by the Fartowners famous "Team of all Talents". This was the culmination of a staggering period of dominance in the game, as they had already picked up two championships, the challenge cup, three Yorkshire Cups and three Yorkshire league titles in the preceding five seasons.

They were captained by Harold Wagstaff, immortalised as the "Prince of Centres", and included several foreign internationals. They easily defeated Leeds, 35–2, in the Championship final, and managed an even greater margin of victory in the Challenge Cup, crushing St. Helens, 37–3, at Oldham.

The season saw Huddersfield's wing-three-quarter Albert Rosenfeld score an impressive 56 tries. However this figure paled into insignificance when it is remembered that Rosenfeld, a Jewish Australian who had come over to Britain with the 1908 Kangaroos, had scored 80 tries the previous season. This record has never yet been beaten.

The First World War intervened, and the team broke up. The Huddersfield club was unable to field a team, reforming only after the war ended.

=== Swinton ===
The final team to win All Four Cups was Swinton, who thus became the only side ever to achieve a Lancashire version of the feat. The 1927–28 Northern Rugby Football League season saw the Lions sweep aside all before them, under the captaincy of centre Hector Halsall. They topped both the League and the Lancashire League, having already defeated Wigan in the Lancashire Cup. In a tense Challenge Cup final they squeezed past Warrington 5–3, and three weeks later the Holy Grail was achieved when they comfortably eased past Featherstone Rovers 11–0 to take the Championship.

== See also ==
- Double (rugby league)
- Treble (rugby league)
