= List of Challenge Cup finals =

The Challenge Cup of rugby league was instituted in the 1896–97 and the final was contested between Batley and St. Helens at Headingley, Leeds. In the seasons during the Second World War the final was played over two legs, with the aggregate score being used. The final was played 67 at many neutral venues up to and including 1928 after which it was mostly played at Wembley Stadium until 1939 just prior to the Second World War apart from 1932 when it was switched to Central Park, Wigan. In the war years, apart from 1940, it was played at various venues between 1941 and 1945 after which it returned to Wembley in 1946 when the final permanently became a Wembley final.

In 1909–10 Leeds and Hull F.C. drew 7–7 for the first time in a final at Huddersfield and a replay resulted in a Leeds win. There have been 3 replays, the latest being 1981–82 at Elland Road between Hull F.C. and Widnes.

== List of Finals ==
‡	Winning team won the Double (League title and Challenge Cup)
†	Winning team won the Domestic Treble
§	Winning team won All Four Cups
(replay)	Replay
(G.P.)	Match went to Golden point

- (In bracket, title count):

Season	Champions (number of titles)	Score	Runners up	Venue	Attendance
1896–97	Batley (1)	10–3	St Helens	Headingley	13,492
1897–98	Batley (2)	7–0	Bradford F.C.	Headingley	27,941
1898–99	Oldham (1)	19–9	Hunslet	Fallowfield	15,763
1899–00	Swinton (1)	16–8	Salford	Fallowfield	17,864
1900–01	Batley (3)	6–0	Warrington	Headingley	29,563
1901–02	Broughton Rangers (1) ‡	25–0	Salford	Athletic Ground	15,006
1902–03	Halifax (1) ‡	7–0	Salford	Headingley	32,507
1903–04	Halifax (2)	8–3	Warrington	The Willows	17,041
1904–05	Warrington (1)	6–0	Hull Kingston Rovers	Headingley	19,638
1905–06	Bradford F.C. (1)	5–0	Salford	Headingley	15,834
1906–07	Warrington (2)	17–3	Oldham	Wheater's Field	18,500
1907–08	Hunslet (1) §	14–0	Hull F.C.	Fartown	18,000
1908–09	Wakefield Trinity (1)	17–0	Hull F.C.	Headingley	23,587
1909–10	Leeds	7–7	Hull F.C.	Fartown	19,413
1909–10	Leeds (1)	26–12 (replay)	Hull F.C.	Fartown	11,608
1910–11	Broughton Rangers (2)	4–0	Wigan	The Willows	8,000
1911–12	Dewsbury (1)	8–5	Oldham	Headingley	15,271
1912–13	Huddersfield (1) †	9–5	Warrington	Headingley	22,754
1913–14	Hull F.C. (1)	6–0	Wakefield Trinity	Thrum Hall	19,000
1914–15	Huddersfield (2) §	37–3	St Helens	Watersheddings	8,000
1919–20	Huddersfield (3)	21–10	Wigan	Headingley	14,000
1920–21	Leigh (1)	13–0	Halifax	Wheater's Field	25,000
1921–22	Rochdale (1)	10–9	Hull F.C.	Headingley	32,596
1922–23	Leeds (2)	28–3	Hull F.C.	Belle Vue	29,335
1923–24	Wigan (1)	21–4	Oldham	Athletic Ground	41,831
1924–25	Oldham (2)	16–3	Hull Kingston Rovers	Headingley	28,335
1925–26	Swinton (2)	9–3	Oldham	Athletic Ground	27,000
1926–27	Oldham (3)	26–7	Swinton	Central Park	33,448
1927–28	Swinton (3) §	5–3	Warrington	Central Park	33,909
1928–29	Wigan (2)	13–2	Dewsbury	Wembley Stadium (Original)	41,500
1929–30	Widnes (1)	10–3	St Helens	Wembley Stadium (Original)	36,544
1930–31	Halifax (3)	22–8	York	Wembley Stadium (Original)	40,365
1931–32	Leeds (3)	11–8	Swinton	Central Park	29,000
1932–33	Huddersfield (4)	21–17	Warrington	Wembley Stadium (Original)	41,874
1933–34	Hunslet (2)	11–5	Widnes	Wembley Stadium (Original)	41,280
1934–35	Castleford (1)	11–8	Huddersfield	Wembley Stadium (Original)	39,000
1935–36	Leeds (4)	18–2	Warrington	Wembley Stadium (Original)	51,250
1936–37	Widnes (2)	18–5	Keighley	Wembley Stadium (Original)	47,699
1937–38	Salford (1)	7–4	Barrow	Wembley Stadium (Original)	51,243
1938–39	Halifax (4)	20–3	Salford	Wembley Stadium (Original)	55,453
1940–41	Leeds (5)	19–2	Halifax	Odsal	28,500
1941–42	Leeds (6)	15–10	Halifax	Odsal	15,250
1942–43	Dewsbury (2)	16–9	Leeds	Crown Flatt	10,470
1942–43	Dewsbury (2)	0–6	Leeds	Headingley	16,000
1943–44	Bradford (1)	3–0	Wigan	Central Park	22,000
1943–44	Bradford (1)	8–0	Wigan	Odsal	30,000
1944–45	Huddersfield (5)	7–4	Bradford	Fartown	9,041
1944–45	Huddersfield (5)	6–5	Bradford	Odsal	17,500
1945–46	Wakefield Trinity (2)	13–12	Wigan	Wembley Stadium (Original)	54,730
1946–47	Bradford (2)	8–4	Leeds	Wembley Stadium (Original)	77,605
1947–48	Wigan (3)	8–3	Bradford	Wembley Stadium (Original)	91,465
1948–49	Bradford (3)	12–0	Halifax	Wembley Stadium (Original)	95,050
1949–50	Warrington (3)	19–0	Widnes	Wembley Stadium (Original)	94,249
1950–51	Wigan (4)	10–0	Barrow	Wembley Stadium (Original)	94,262
1951–52	Workington Town (1)	18–10	Featherstone Rovers	Wembley Stadium (Original)	72,093
1952–53	Huddersfield (6)	15–10	St Helens	Wembley Stadium (Original)	89,588
1953–54	Warrington	4–4	Halifax	Wembley Stadium (Original)	81,841
1953–54	Warrington (4) ‡	8–4 (replay)	Halifax	Odsal	102,569
1954–55	Barrow (1)	21–12	Workington Town	Wembley Stadium (Original)	66,513
1955–56	St Helens (1)	13–2	Halifax	Wembley Stadium (Original)	79,341
1956–57	Leeds (7)	9–7	Barrow	Wembley Stadium (Original)	76,318
1957–58	Wigan (5)	13–9	Workington Town	Wembley Stadium (Original)	66,109
1958–59	Wigan (6)	30–13	Hull F.C.	Wembley Stadium (Original)	79,811
1959–60	Wakefield Trinity (3)	38–5	Hull F.C.	Wembley Stadium (Original)	79,773
1960–61	St Helens (2)	12–6	Wigan	Wembley Stadium (Original)	94,672
1961–62	Wakefield Trinity (4)	12–6	Huddersfield	Wembley Stadium (Original)	81,263
1962–63	Wakefield Trinity (5)	25–10	Wigan	Wembley Stadium (Original)	84,492
1963–64	Widnes (3)	13–5	Hull Kingston Rovers	Wembley Stadium (Original)	84,488
1964–65	Wigan (7)	20–16	Hunslet	Wembley Stadium (Original)	89,016
1965–66	St Helens (3) †	21–2	Wigan	Wembley Stadium (Original)	98,536
1966–67	Featherstone Rovers (1)	17–12	Barrow	Wembley Stadium (Original)	76,290
1967–68	Leeds (8)	11–10	Wakefield Trinity	Wembley Stadium (Original)	87,100
1968–69	Castleford (2)	11–6	Salford	Wembley Stadium (Original)	97,939
1969–70	Castleford (3)	7–2	Wigan	Wembley Stadium (Original)	95,255
1970–71	Leigh (2)	24–7	Leeds	Wembley Stadium (Original)	85,514
1971–72	St Helens (4)	16–13	Leeds	Wembley Stadium (Original)	89,495
1972–73	Featherstone Rovers (2)	33–14	Bradford	Wembley Stadium (Original)	72,395
1973–74	Warrington (5)	24–9	Featherstone Rovers	Wembley Stadium (Original)	77,400
1974–75	Widnes (4)	14–7	Warrington	Wembley Stadium (Original)	85,098
1975–76	St Helens (5)	20–5	Widnes	Wembley Stadium (Original)	89,982
1976–77	Leeds (9)	16–7	Widnes	Wembley Stadium (Original)	80,871
1977–78	Leeds (10)	14–12	St Helens	Wembley Stadium (Original)	96,000
1978–79	Widnes (5)	12–3	Wakefield Trinity	Wembley Stadium (Original)	94,218
1979–80	Hull Kingston Rovers (1)	10–5	Hull F.C.	Wembley Stadium (Original)	95,000
1980–81	Widnes (6)	18–9	Hull Kingston Rovers	Wembley Stadium (Original)	92,496
1981–82	Hull F.C.	14–14	Widnes	Wembley Stadium (Original)	92,147
1981–82	Hull F.C. (2)	18–9 (replay)	Widnes	Elland Road	41,171
1982–83	Featherstone Rovers (3)	14–12	Hull F.C.	Wembley Stadium (Original)	84,969
1983–84	Widnes (7)	19–6	Wigan	Wembley Stadium (Original)	80,116
1984–85	Wigan (8)	28–24	Hull F.C.	Wembley Stadium (Original)	97,801
1985–86	Castleford (4)	15–14	Hull Kingston Rovers	Wembley Stadium (Original)	82,134
1986–87	Halifax (5)	19–18	St Helens	Wembley Stadium (Original)	91,267
1987–88	Wigan (9)	32–12	Halifax	Wembley Stadium (Original)	94,273
1988–89	Wigan (10)	27–0	St Helens	Wembley Stadium (Original)	78,000
1989–90	Wigan (11) ‡	36–14	Warrington	Wembley Stadium (Original)	77,729
1990–91	Wigan (12) ‡	13–8	St Helens	Wembley Stadium (Original)	75,532
1991–92	Wigan (13) †	28–12	Castleford	Wembley Stadium (Original)	77,386
1992–93	Wigan (14) ‡	20–14	Widnes	Wembley Stadium (Original)	77,684
1993–94	Wigan (15) §	26–16	Leeds	Wembley Stadium (Original)	78,348
1994–95	Wigan (16) †	30–10	Leeds	Wembley Stadium (Original)	78,550
1996	St Helens (6) ‡	40–32	Bradford	Wembley Stadium (Original)	75,994
1997	St Helens (7)	32–22	Bradford	Wembley Stadium (Original)	78,022
1998	Sheffield (1)	17–8	Wigan	Wembley Stadium (Original)	60,669
1999	Leeds (11)	52–16	London	Wembley Stadium (Original)	73,242
2000	Bradford (4)	24–18	Leeds	Murrayfield	67,247
2001	St Helens (8)	13–6	Bradford	Twickenham	68,250
2002	Wigan (17)	21–12	St Helens	Murrayfield	62,140
2003	Bradford (5) §	22–20	Leeds	Millennium Stadium	71,212
2004	St Helens (9)	32–16	Wigan	Millennium Stadium	73,734
2005	Hull F.C. (3)	25–24	Leeds	Millennium Stadium	74,213
2006	St Helens (10) §	42–12	Huddersfield	Twickenham	65,187
2007	St Helens (11)	30–8	Catalans	Wembley Stadium	84,241
2008	St Helens (12)	28–16	Hull F.C.	Wembley Stadium	82,821
2009	Warrington (6)	25–16	Huddersfield	Wembley Stadium	76,560
2010	Warrington (7)	30–6	Leeds	Wembley Stadium	85,217
2011	Wigan (18)	28–18	Leeds	Wembley Stadium	78,482
2012	Warrington (8)	35–18	Leeds	Wembley Stadium	79,180
2013	Wigan (18) ‡	16–0	Hull F.C.	Wembley Stadium	78,137
2014	Leeds (12)	23–10	Castleford	Wembley Stadium	77,914
2015	Leeds (13) †	50–0	Hull Kingston Rovers	Wembley Stadium	80,140
2016	Hull F.C. (4)	12–10	Warrington	Wembley Stadium	76,235
2017	Hull F.C. (5)	18–14	Wigan	Wembley Stadium	68,525
2018	Catalans (1)	20–14	Warrington	Wembley Stadium	50,672
2019	Warrington (9)	18–4	St Helens	Wembley Stadium	62,717
2020	Leeds (14)	17–16	Salford	Wembley Stadium	0 (Note: The 2020 final was played behind closed doors due to the COVID-19 pandemic.)
2021	St Helens (13) ‡	26–12	Castleford	Wembley Stadium	40,000 (Note: The 2021 final was played in front of a restricted crowd of 40,000 due to the Covid-19 Pandemic.)
2022	Wigan (20)	16–14	Huddersfield	Tottenham Hotspur Stadium	51,628
2023	Leigh (3)	17–16 (G.P.)	Hull Kingston Rovers	Wembley Stadium	58,213
2024	Wigan (21) §	18–8	Warrington	Wembley Stadium	64,845
2025	Hull Kingston Rovers (2) §	8–6	Warrington	Wembley Stadium	63,278
2026	Wigan (22)	40–10	Hull Kingston Rovers	Wembley Stadium	56,383

== Results by club ==
Team	Winners	Runners-up	Years won
Wigan Warriors	22	12	1924, 1929, 1948, 1951, 1958, 1959, 1965, 1985, 1988, 1989, 1990, 1991, 1992, 1993, 1994, 1995, 2002, 2011, 2013, 2022, 2024, 2026
Leeds Rhinos	14	12	1910, 1923, 1932, 1936, 1941, 1942, 1957, 1968, 1977, 1978, 1999, 2014, 2015, 2020
St Helens	13	10	1956, 1961, 1966, 1972, 1976, 1996, 1997, 2001, 2004, 2006, 2007, 2008, 2021
Warrington Wolves	9	12	1905, 1907, 1950, 1954, 1974, 2009, 2010, 2012, 2019
Widnes Vikings	7	6	1930, 1937, 1964, 1975, 1979, 1981, 1984
Huddersfield Giants	6	5	1913, 1915, 1920, 1933, 1945, 1953
Hull FC	5	12	1914, 1982, 2005, 2016, 2017
Halifax	5	7	1903, 1904, 1931, 1939, 1987
Bradford Bulls	5	6	1944, 1947, 1949, 2000, 2003
Wakefield Trinity	5	3	1909, 1946, 1960, 1962, 1963
Castleford Tigers	4	3	1935, 1969, 1970, 1986
Oldham	3	4	1899, 1925, 1927
Swinton Lions	3	2	1900, 1926, 1928
Featherstone Rovers	3	2	1967, 1973, 1983
Batley Bulldogs	3	0	1897, 1898, 1901
Leigh Leopards	3	0	1921, 1971, 2023
Hull Kingston Rovers	2	8	1980, 2025
Hunslet	2	2	1908, 1934
Dewsbury Rams	2	1	1912, 1943
Broughton Rangers §	2	0	1902, 1911
Salford Red Devils	1	7	1938
Barrow Raiders	1	4	1955
Workington Town	1	2	1952
Bradford FC §	1	1	1906
Catalans Dragons±	1	1	2018
Rochdale Hornets	1	0	1922
Sheffield Eagles	1	0	1998
York	0	1	–
Keighley Cougars	0	1	–
London Broncos	0	1	–

- § Denotes club now defunct
- ± Denotes a non-English club.

== Venues ==
=== Current venue ===
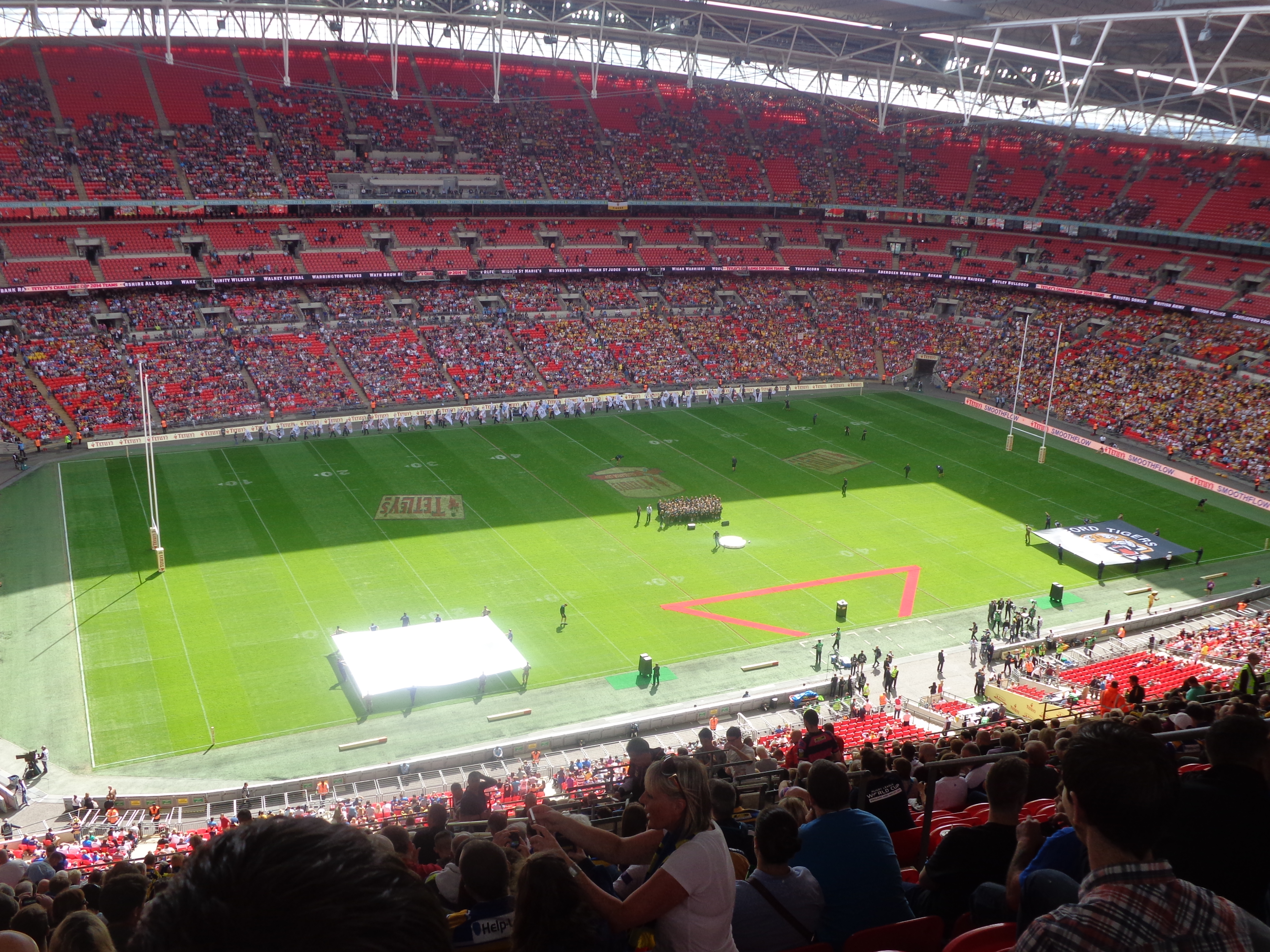
Pre-match at the 2014 Challenge Cup Final at Wembley Stadium

Date	Venue	Location	Capacity
2007–2021; 2023–	Wembley Stadium	Wembley, London	90,000

=== Former venues ===
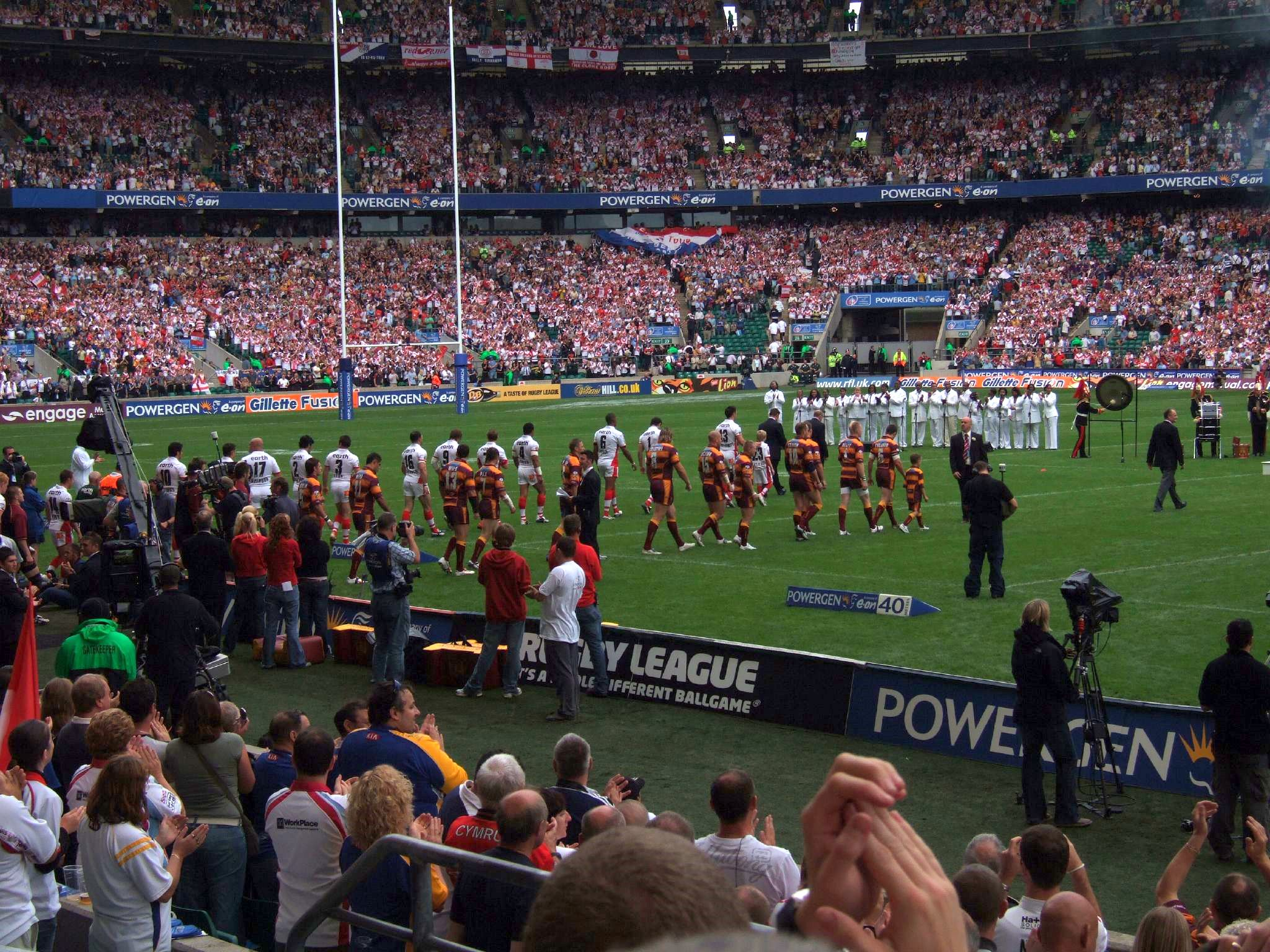
Teams walk out during the 2006 Challenge Cup Final at Twickenham Stadium

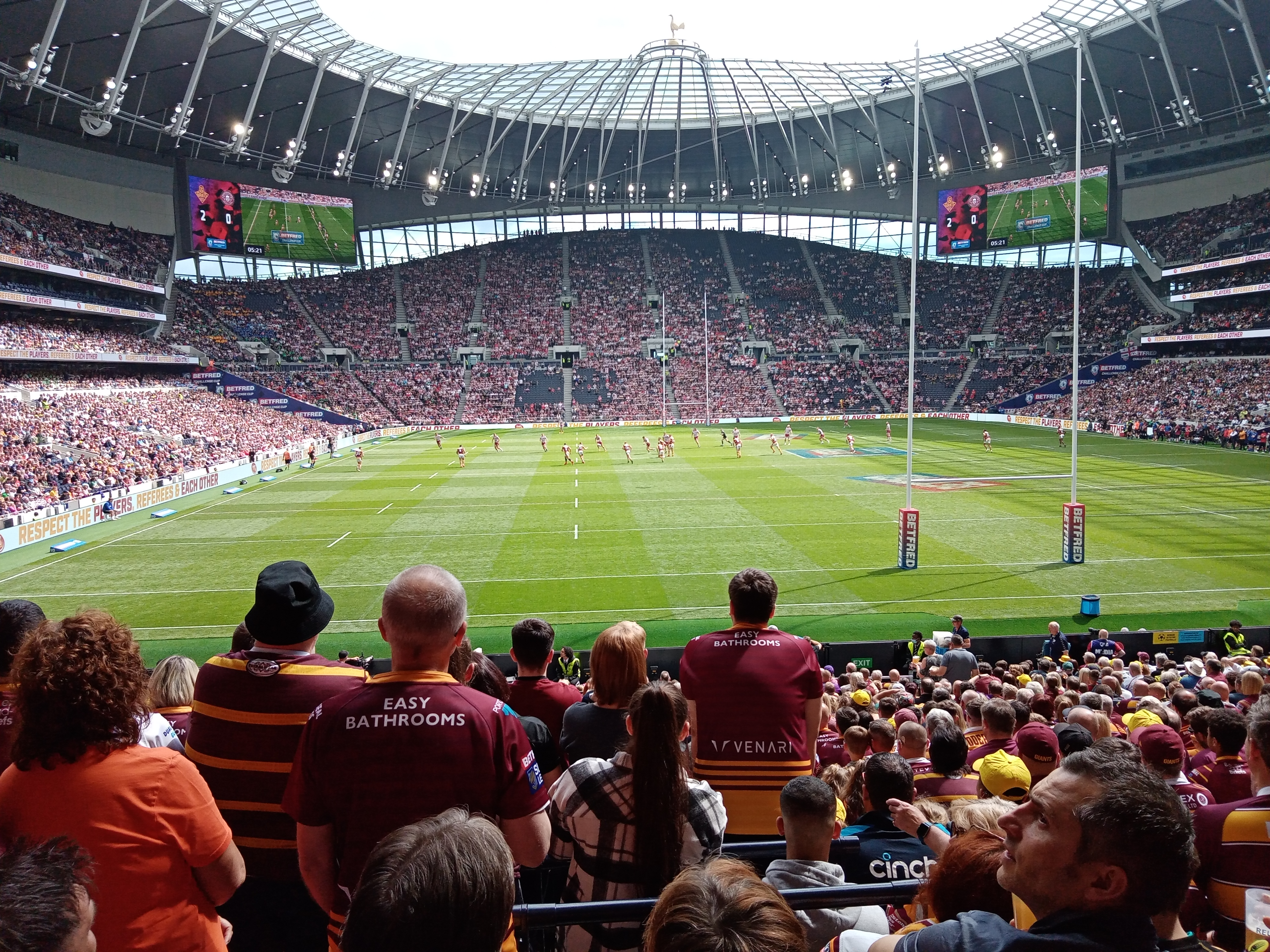
During the 2022 Challenge Cup Final at the Tottenham Hotspur Stadium

The Challenge Cup final has been held at 12 neutral venues.

Venue	Location	Capacity	Last Use
Wembley Stadium (Original)	Wembley, London	82,000	2000
Twickenham Stadium	Twickenham, London	82,000	2006
Millennium Stadium	Cardiff, South Glamorgan	74,500	2005
Murrayfield Stadium	Edinburgh, Midlothian	67,144	2002
Tottenham Hotspur Stadium	Tottenham, London	62,850	2022
Athletic Grounds	Rochdale, Greater Manchester	41,831	1926
Fartown	Huddersfield, West Yorkshire	35,000	1945
Thrum Hall	Halifax, West Yorkshire	29,000	1914
Watersheddings	Oldham, Greater Manchester	28,000	1942
Odsal	Bradford, West Yorkshire	27,500	1915
Headingley	Leeds, West Yorkshire	21,500	1925
Wheater's Field	Broughton, Greater Manchester	20,000	1921
Central Park	Wigan, Greater Manchester	18,000	1944
Fallowfield	Manchester, Greater Manchester	15,000	1900
Belle Vue	Wakefield, West Yorkshire	12,600	1923
The Willows	Weaste, Greater Manchester	11,363	1911
Crown Flatt (Old Ground)	Dewsbury, West Yorkshire	10,000	1943

=== Replay venues ===
In the event of a draw a replay will be played at a neutral venue. There have been three replays.

Year	Venue	Location	Capacity
1909-10	Fartown	Huddersfield, West Yorkshire	35,000
1953-54	Odsal	Bradford, West Yorkshire	27,500
1981-82	Elland Road	Leeds, West Yorkshire	39,000
