= 1906–07 Lancashire Cup =

- Structure: Regional knockout competition
- Teams: 13
- Winners: Broughton Rangers
- Runners-up: Warrington

The 1906–07 Lancashire Cup was the second year that the competition was conducted and saw two clubs fight it out for the right to hold the trophy. This year, the cup was won by Broughton Rangers who beat Warrington at Central Park, Wigan, (historically in the county of Lancashire), by a score of 15–6. The attendance for the final was 14,048 and receipts £392.

== Background ==
For this season's competition, Morecambe had left the league and no junior/amateur club were included, but in their place were new league entrants, Wigan Highfield. This resulted in there being 13 teams in the competition (one less than the preceding year) which resulted in three clubs awarded byes in the first round.

== Fixtures and results ==
=== Round 1 ===
Involved 5 matches (with three byes) and 16 Clubs

Game No	Fixture date	Home team	Score	Away team	Venue	Att	Rec	Notes	Ref
1	Sat 13 October 1906	Broughton Rangers	56–3	Liverpool City	Wheater's Field				
2	Sat 13 October 1906	St. Helens	14–17	Oldham	Knowsley Road				
3	Sat 13 October 1906	Salford	12–3	Wigan	The Willows				
4	Sat 13 October 1906	Warrington	31–18	Leigh	Wilderspool				
5	Sat 13 October 1906	Widnes	5–14	Runcorn	Lowerhouse Lane				
6		Swinton		bye					
7		Rochdale Hornets		bye					
8		Barrow		bye					

=== Round 2 – Quarterfinals ===
Game No	Fixture date	Home team	Score	Away team	Venue	Att	Rec	Notes	Ref
1	Sat 27 October 1906	Broughton Rangers	25–2	Swinton	Wheater's Field				
2	Sat 27 October 1906	Oldham	20–2	Rochdale Hornets	Watersheddings				
3	Sat 27 October 1906	Salford	2–3	Runcorn	The Willows				
4	Sat 27 October 1906	Warrington	47–14	Barrow	Wilderspool				

=== Round 3 – semifinals ===
Game No	Fixture date	Home team	Score	Away team	Venue	Att	Rec	Notes	Ref
1	Sat 17 November 1906	Broughton Rangers	5–0	Runcorn	Wheater's Field				
2	Sat 17 November 1906	Warrington	10–2	Oldham	Wilderspool				

=== Final ===
1 December 1906

Broughton Rangers	15–6	Warrington
Tries: Wilson, Flynn, Darlison; Goals: Harris (2), Flynn		Tries: Dickenson, Brookes

Central Park, Wigan
Attendance: 14,048
Referee: J. H. Smith (Widnes)

==== Teams ====
Broughton Rangers	№	Warrington
	Teams	
Barton	1	Berry
Andrew Hogg	2	Jack Fish
Robert Wilson	3	George Dickenson
C. James	4	I. Taylor
W. Harris	5	Ernest Brookes
S. James	6	S. Lees
John Flynn	7	Thomas Hockenhull
J. Beetham	8	Alf Boardman
Mottram	9	Jack Preston
Darlison	10	George Thomas
G. Whitehead	11	A. Naylor
Jim Clampitt	12	Heath
George Ruddick	13	J. Harmer

=== The road to success ===
First round
Broughton Rangers	56
Wigan Highfield	3
Swinton
bye
Salford	12
Wigan	3
Widnes	5
Runcorn	14
Warrington	31
Leigh	18
Barrow
bye
St. Helens	14
Oldham	17
Rochdale Hornets
bye

Second round
Broughton Rangers	25
Swinton	2
Salford	2
Runcorn	3
Warrington	47
Barrow	14
Oldham	20
Rochdale Hornets	2

Semifinals
Broughton Rangers	5
Runcorn	0
Warrington	10
Oldham	2

Final
Broughton Rangers	15
Warrington	6

== See also ==
- British rugby league system
- 1906–07 Northern Rugby Football Union season
- Rugby league county cups
