= George Ruddick =

GB & Wales international rugby league & union footballer

Personal information
- Full name: George Ruddick
- Born: 16 September 1881 Brecon (Brecknock), Wales
- Died: February 1949 (aged 67) Manchester, England

Playing information
- Height: 5 ft 10 in (178 cm)
- Weight: 13 st 4 lb (84 kg)

Rugby union
Club
Years	Team	Pld	T	G	FG	P
≤1899–99	Brecon RFC

Rugby league
- Position: Forward
Club
Years	Team	Pld	T	G	FG	P
1899–15	Broughton Rangers	422
Representative
Years	Team	Pld	T	G	FG	P
1901–08	Lancashire
1908–11	Wales	4	1	0	0	3
1908–10	Great Britain	4	0	0	0	0

George Ruddick (16 September 1881 – February 1949) was a Welsh rugby union, and professional rugby league footballer who played in the 1890s, 1900s and 1910s. He played club level rugby union (RU) for Brecon RFC, and representative level rugby league (RL) for Great Britain, Wales, and Lancashire, and at club level for Broughton Rangers, as a forward.

== Personal background ==
George Ruddick's birth was registered in Brecon (Brecknock), he first came to note as a rugby player when he represented local rugby union club Brecon RFC. In an appraisal by former British Isles rugby union captain, Arthur Harding, Ruddick is described as a 'particularly good dribbler … a good tackler' and '…keen as a terrier.' Ruddick was wounded and badly injured a foot in World War I which meant he was unable to play again. He died at his home in New Moston in February 1949.

== Playing career ==
=== International honours ===
Ruddick won caps for Wales (RL) while at Broughton Rangers 1908…1910 3-caps, and won caps for Great Britain (RL) while at Broughton Rangers in 1908 against New Zealand (2 matches), and on the 1910 Great Britain Lions tour of Australia and New Zealand against Australia and Australasia.

=== Championship final appearances ===
Ruddick played in Broughton Rangers' victory in the Championship during the 1901–02 season.

=== Challenge Cup Final appearances ===
Ruddick played as a forward in Broughton Rangers' 25-0 victory over Salford in the 1902 Challenge Cup Final during the 1901–02 season at Athletic Grounds, Rochdale, and the 4-0 victory over Wigan in the 1911 Challenge Cup Final during the 1910–11 season at The Willows, Salford, in front of a crowd of 15,006.

=== County Cup Final appearances ===
Ruddick played as a forward, in Broughton Rangers' 15-6 victory over Warrington in the 1906 Lancashire Cup Final during the 1906–07 season at Central Park, Wigan on Saturday 1 December 1906.
