= Ernest Brookes (rugby league) =

GB & England international rugby league footballer

Personal information
- Full name: Ernest Brookes
- Born: c. 1884; Bewsey, Warrington, England
- Died: July 1940 (aged 56); Warrington district, England

Playing information
- Weight: 11 st 8 lb (73 kg)
- Position: Wing, Stand-off, Scrum-half
Club
Years	Team	Pld	T	G	FG	P
1902–20	Warrington	297	81	25		293
Representative
Years	Team	Pld	T	G	FG	P
1907–11	Lancashire	6	2	0	0	6
1908–08	England	1	0	0	0	0
1908–09	Great Britain	3	1	2	0	7

Ernest "Ernie" Brookes (first ¼ 1884 – July 1940), also known by the nickname of "The Terrier", was an English professional rugby league footballer who played in the 1900s, 1910s and 1920s. He played at representative level for Great Britain, England and Lancashire, and at club level for Warrington, as a wing, stand-off or scrum-half.

== Background ==
Ernie Brookes was born in Bewsey, Warrington, Lancashire, and his death aged 56 was registered in Warrington district, Lancashire, England.

== Playing career ==
=== Club career ===
Ernie Brookes played stand-off in Warrington's 10–3 victory over Australia in the 1908–09 Kangaroo tour of Great Britain tour match during the 1908–09 season at Wilderspool Stadium, Warrington, Saturday 14 November 1908, in front of a crowd of 5,000, due to the strikes in the cotton mills, the attendance was badly affected, the loss of earnings meant that some fans could not afford to watch the first tour by the Australian rugby league team.

Ernie Brookes played scrum-half in Warrington's 6–0 victory over Hull Kingston Rovers in the 1904–05 Challenge Cup Final during the 1904–05 season at Headingley, Leeds, in front of a crowd of 19,638, played left wing in the 17–3 victory over Oldham in the 1906–07 Challenge Cup Final during the 1906–07 season at Wheater's Field, Broughton, Salford on Saturday 27 April 1907, in front of a crowd of 18,500, and played right wing in the 5–9 defeat by Huddersfield in the 1912–13 Challenge Cup Final during the 1912–13 season at Headingley, Leeds, in front of a crowd of 22,754,

Ernie Brookes played, and scored a try in Warrington's 6–15 defeat by Broughton Rangers in the 1906 Lancashire Cup Final during the 1906–07 season at Central Park, Wigan on Saturday 1 December 1906.

=== International honours ===
Ernie Brookes won a cap for England while at Warrington in 1908 against Wales, and won caps for Great Britain while at Warrington in 1908–09 against Australia (3 matches).

== Honours ==
Ernie Brookes is a Warrington Wolves Hall of Fame inductee.
