= Ned Jones (rugby) =

Wales international rugby league & union footballer

Personal information
- Full name: Edmund Jones
- Born: Maesteg, Wales
- Died: unknown

Playing information

Rugby union
Club
Years	Team	Pld	T	G	FG	P
≤1913–≤13	Pontycymmer RFC
≤1913–≥13	Bryncethin RFC
≤1913–≥13	Maesteg RFC
	Total	0	0	0	0	0
Representative
Years	Team	Pld	T	G	FG	P
≤1913–≤13	Glamorgan	≥1

Rugby league
- Position: Scrum-half
Club
Years	Team	Pld	T	G	FG	P
1904–10	Wigan
1910–15	Broughton Rangers
1915	Bradford Northern
	Total	0	0	0	0	0
Representative
Years	Team	Pld	T	G	FG	P
1913	Wales	1

Edmund "Ned" Jones was a Welsh rugby union and professional rugby league footballer who played in the 1900s and 1910s. He played representative level union (RU) for Glamorgan, and at club level Pontycymmer RFC, Bryncethin RFC and Maesteg RFC, and representative level rugby league (RL) for Wales, and at club level for Wigan, and Broughton Rangers, as a scrum-half.

== Background ==
Ned Jones was born in Maesteg, Wales.

== Playing career ==
=== Club career ===
Jones started his rugby league career in England with Wigan in 1904, joining from rugby union club Pontycymmer RFC. He signed for Broughton Rangers in December 1910.

Ned Jones played scrum-half in Broughton Rangers' 4–0 victory over Wigan in the 1911 Challenge Cup Final during the 1910–11 season at The Willows, Salford, in front of a crowd of 15,006.

He joined Bradford Northern in January 1915.

=== International honours ===
Ned Jones won a cap for Wales while at Broughton Rangers in 1913.
