= 1907–08 Lancashire Cup =

- Structure: Regional knockout competition
- Teams: 12
- Winners: Oldham
- Runners-up: Broughton Rangers

The 1907–08 Lancashire Cup was the third year for this regional rugby league competition and saw its third different winner. The cup was won by Oldham, who beat the previous year's winners, Broughton Rangers, at The Athletic Grounds, Rochdale by a score of 16–9. The attendance for the final was 14,000 and receipts £340.

The venue was the third different venue used in the three years which the competition had run.

== Background ==
For this season's competition, with the loss of Wigan Highfield, there were now only 12 semi-professional clubs, and with no junior team involved, this led to there being four clubs awarded byes in the first round

== Competition and results ==
=== Round 1 ===
Involved 4 matches (with four byes) and 12 Clubs

| Game No | Fixture date | Home team | Score | Away team | Venue | Att | Rec | Notes | Ref |
|---|---|---|---|---|---|---|---|---|---|
| 1 | Sat 12 October 1907 | Broughton Rangers | 28-0 | Rochdale Hornets | Wheater's Field | | | | |
| 2 | Sat 12 October 1907 | Oldham | 22-3 | Barrow | Watersheddings | | | | |
| 3 | Sat 12 October 1907 | Runcorn | 2-15 | Warrington | Canal Street | | | | |
| 4 | Sat 12 October 1907 | Swinton | 7-0 | St. Helens | Chorley Road ground | | | | |
| 5 | | Leigh | | bye | . | | | | |
| 6 | | Salford | | bye | | | | | |
| 7 | | Wigan | | bye | | | | | |
| 8 | | Widnes | | bye | | | | | |

=== Round 2 - Quarterfinals ===
| Game No | Fixture date | Home team | Score | Away team | Venue | Att | Rec | Notes | Ref |
|---|---|---|---|---|---|---|---|---|---|
| 1 | Sat 26 October 1907 | Leigh | 13-11 | Warrington | Mather Lane | | | | |
| 2 | Sat 26 October 1907 | Oldham | 13-0 | Swinton | Watersheddings | | | | |
| 3 | Sat 26 October 1907 | Salford | 10-8 | Wigan | The Willows | | | | |
| 4 | Sat 26 October 1907 | Widnes | 0-14 | Broughton Rangers | Lowerhouse Lane | | | | |

=== Round 3 – semifinals ===
| Game No | Fixture date | Home team | Score | Away team | Venue | Att | Rec | Notes | Ref |
|---|---|---|---|---|---|---|---|---|---|
| 1 | Sat 16 November 1907 | Leigh | 8-26 | Broughton Rangers | Mather Lane | | | | |
| 2 | Sat 16 November 1907 | Salford | 7-8 | Oldham | The Willows | | | | |

=== Final ===
| Game No | Fixture date | Home team | Score | Away team | Venue | Att | Rec | Notes | Ref |
|---|---|---|---|---|---|---|---|---|---|
| | Saturday 30 November 1907 | Oldham | 16-9 | Broughton Rangers | Athletic Grounds | 14000 | £340 | | |

==== Teams and scorers ====
| Oldham | No. | Broughton Rangers |
|---|---|---|
| | Teams | |
| Dicky Thomas | 1 | Billy Barlow |
| George Tyson | 2 | Billy Harris |
| Billy Dixon | 3 | Andy Hogg |
| Tom Llewellyn | 4 | Bob Wilson |
| Arthur Oldershaw | 5 | Jack Flynn |
| Tom White | 6 | Sam James |
| David Benyon | 7 | Horton |
| Joe Ferguson | 8 | George Ruddick |
| Bert Avery | 9 | Jack Beetham |
| Arthur Smith | 10 | J. Grainey |
| Billy Longworth | 11 | Jim Clampitt |
| Harry Topham | 12 | C.J. Darlison |
| Joe Wilkinson | 13 | Mottram |
| 16 | score | 9 |
| 8 | HT | 3 |
| | Scorers | |
| Tom Llewellyn | Tries | |
| Arthur Oldershaw | T | Andy Hogg |
| Joe Ferguson, Arthur Smith | T | |
| | Goals | |
| Joe Ferguson (2) | G | Billy Barlow (3) |
| | Drop Goals | |
| | DG | |
| | Referee | H. Farrar (Keighley) |

Scoring - Try = three (3) points - Goal = two (2) points - Drop goal = two (2) points

=== The road to success ===
First round
Salford
bye
Wigan
bye
Oldham | 22
Barrow | 3
Swinton | 7
St. Helens | 0
Leigh
bye
Runcorn | 2
Warrington | 15
Widnes
bye
Broughton Rangers | 28
Rochdale Hornets | 0

Second round
Salford | 10
Wigan | 8
Oldham | 13
Swinton | 0
Leigh | 13
Warrington | 11
Widnes | 0
Broughton Rangers | 14

Semifinals
Salford | 7
Oldham | 8
Leigh | 8
Broughton Rangers | 26

Final
Oldham | 19
Broughton Rangers | 9

== See also ==
- 1907–08 Northern Rugby Football Union season
- Rugby league county cups
