= Dai Smith =

Dai Smith may refer to:

- Dai Smith (rugby league) (fl. 1900s), Welsh rugby league player
- Dai Smith (academic) (born 1945), Welsh academic and former Chair of the Arts Council of Wales
