= 1920–21 Lancashire Cup =

- Structure: Regional knockout competition
- Teams: 14
- Winners: Broughton Rangers
- Runners-up: Leigh

The 1920–21 Lancashire Cup competition was the thirteenth playing of this regional rugby league competition. Broughton Rangers beat Leigh in the final at The Willows, Salford by a score of 6–3. The attendance at the final was 25,000 and receipts £1800. Both set new records at the time; the previous highest attendance was 20,000 in 1911.

== Background ==
The number of teams entering this year's competition was increased by 2 from the previous season's 12 to 14 with the introduction of two junior/amateur clubs Wigan Highfield (who would become members of the league in two years time), and Cumbrian team Askam. This enabled the competition to be run with only 2 byes in the first round.

== Competition and results ==
=== Round 1 ===
Involved 6 matches (with two byes) and 14 clubs

Game No	Fixture date	Home team	Score	Away team	Venue	Att	Rec	Notes	Ref
1	Sat 16 October 1920	Oldham	0–6	Leigh	Watersheddings				
2	Sat 16 October 1920	Rochdale Hornets	'11–5	Salford	Athletic Grounds				
3	Sat 16 October 1920	St Helens Recs	16–0	Barrow	City Road				
4	Sat 16 October 1920	St. Helens	26–2	Askam	Knowsley Road			1	
5	Sat 16 October 1920	Swinton	11–18	Wigan	Chorley Road ground				
6	Sat 16 October 1920	Wigan Highfield	2–12	Broughton Rangers	Tunstall Lane			2	
7		Warrington		bye					
8		Widnes		bye					

=== Round 2 – quarterfinals ===
Game No	Fixture date	Home team	Score	Away team	Venue	Att	Rec	Notes	Ref
1	Sat 30 October 1920	Broughton Rangers	6–2	St. Helens	The Cliff				
2	Sat 30 October 1920	Rochdale Hornets	0–0	Leigh	Athletic Grounds				
3	Sat 30 October 1920	Warrington	5–9	St Helens Recs	Wilderspool				
4	Sat 30 October 1920	Widnes	13–12	Wigan	Lowerhouse Lane				
Replay
5	Wed 3 November 1920	Leigh	9–7	Rochdale Hornets	Mather Lane				

=== Round 3 – semifinals ===
Game No	Fixture date	Home team	Score	Away team	Venue	Att	Rec	Notes	Ref
1	Sat 13 November 1920	Broughton Rangers	9–4	Widnes	The Cliff				
2	Sat 13 November 1920	Leigh	9–3	St Helens Recs	Mather Lane				

=== Final ===
Game No	Fixture date	Home team	Score	Away team	Venue	Att	Rec	Notes	Ref
	Saturday 4 December 1920	Broughton Rangers	6–3	Leigh	The Willows	25000	£1,800	3	

==== Teams and scorers ====
Broughton Rangers	№	Leigh
	Teams	
Tom Danson	1	Tommy Clarkson
Critchley	2	George Higham
George Davidson	3	Dai Price
James Barnes	4	Wyndham Emery
Harold Povey	5	Stanley Rowe
Thomas Moss	6	Bert Ganley (c)
Alex Hurst	7	Emlyn Thomas
W. Larkin	8	Jim Winstanley
W. Cheetham	9	Joe Cartwright
A. Tomkins	10	Jack Prosser
Jack Price	11	Joe Darwell
J. Richardson	12	Fred Coffey
James Scott	13	Dai Davies
6	score	3
6	HT	0
	Scorers	
	Tries	
James Barnes	T	George Higham
Jack Price	T	
	Goals	
	G	
	Drop Goals	
	DG	
Referee		A. Brown (Wakefield)

Scoring – Try = three (3) points – Goal = two (2) points – Drop goal = two (2) points

=== The road to success ===
First round
Wigan Highfield	2
Broughton Rangers	12
St. Helens	26
Askam	2
Widnes
bye
Swinton	11
Wigan	18
Rochdale Hornets	11
Salford	5
Oldham	0
Leigh	6
Warrington
bye
St Helens Recs	16
Barrow	0

Second round
Broughton Rangers	6
St. Helens	2
Widnes	13
Wigan	12
Rochdale Hornets	0(7)
Leigh	0(9)
Warrington	6
St Helens Recs	9

Semifinals
Broughton Rangers	9
Widnes	4
Leigh	9
St Helens Recs	3

Final
Broughton Rangers	6
Leigh	3

== See also ==
- 1920–21 Northern Rugby Football Union season

== Notes ==
- 1 Askam are a junior (or amateur) team from the neighbourhood of Barrow in Cumbria (originally the Furness district of Lancashire).
- 2 Wigan Highfield were at the time a Junior (or amateur) Club. They joined the league in season 1922–23
- 3 The Willows was the home ground of Salford
