= James Lomas (rugby league) =

English rugby league coach (1879–1960)

Jim Lomas
Personal information
- Full name: James Lomas
- Born: 26 August 1879 Maryport, Cumberland, England
- Died: 11 February 1960 (aged 80) Crumpsall, Manchester, Lancashire, England

Playing information
- Height: 5 ft 7 in (170 cm)
- Weight: 13 st 5 lb (85 kg; 187 lb)

Rugby union
Club
Years	Team	Pld	T	G	FG	P
1896–98	Maryport

Rugby league
- Position: wing, centre
Club
Years	Team	Pld	T	G	FG	P
1900–01	Bramley	31	4	21		54
1901–11	Salford	304	208	464	0	1552
1911–12	Oldham	80	38	37	0	188
1913–19	York	53	21	68		199
1922–24	Salford	8	0	6		12
	Total	476	271	596	0	2005
Representative
Years	Team	Pld	T	G	FG	P
1899–12	Cumberland	14	6	8		34
1901–06	Lancashire	9	2	6		18
1904–11	England	13	6	21		60
1908–12	Great Britain	7	4	12		36

Coaching information
Club
Years	Team	Gms	W	D	L	W%
1922–26	Salford
- Relatives: Tom Smith (half-brother)

James Lomas (26 August 1879 – 11 February 1960), also known by the nickname of "Jumbo", was an English professional rugby league footballer who played in the 1890s, 1900s, 1910s and 1920s, and coached in the 1920s. A three-quarter, and prominent goal-kicker, he captained the Great Britain national rugby league team. After starting with his home town Maryport's rugby union club, Lomas switched to rugby league, playing for Bramley, Salford, Oldham and York in a career that lasted for twenty-four years from 1899 to 1923, and saw him set new transfer fee and point scoring records. He also played representative matches for England, Lancashire and Cumberland. After retiring from playing Lomas coached Salford.

== Early life ==
Lomas was born on 26 August 1879 in Maryport, Cumberland, England, the son of Sarah (née Tyson) and James Lomas. He is the younger brother of Tom Smith, who played association football for Preston North End and Tottenham Hotspur.

== Career ==
=== Early career ===
Lomas started his career with his hometown rugby club, Maryport, while they were still playing rugby union. His first known appearance for the first team came on 14 November 1896 in a 3–0 defeat against Millom. Lomas remained with the club when they made the switch to rugby league and joined the Northern Rugby Football Union in March 1898. In 1899, he made his début appearance for Cumberland aged 19, scoring the only try of the match which was a 3-0 victory over Cheshire at Whitehaven.

=== 1900s ===
Lomas became rugby league's first £100 transfer, from Bramley to Salford in 1901 (based on increases in average earnings, this would be approximately £35,890 in 2013). He played for them in the 1902 Challenge Cup Final loss against Broughton Rangers. He then played in 1904's first ever international rugby league match for England against Other Nationalities. His club record for most points in a game (39), achieved for Salford against Liverpool City on 2 February 1907, still stands today. He also played in the 1904 Challenge Cup final for Salford.

Lomas was also notable for his goal-kicking style. He was the first player to stand the ball up on its end. Lomas won caps for England while at Salford playing centre, but arriving after the start of the match, in the 3-9 defeat by Other Nationalities at Central Park, Wigan on Tuesday 5 April 1904, in the first ever international rugby league match. in 1905 against Other Nationalities, in 1906 against Other Nationalities, in 1908 against New Zealand, and Wales, in 1909 against Australia (3 matches) and Wales. Lomas also won caps for Great Britain while at Salford in 1908–09 against Australia (2 matches, both as captain), in 1910 against Australia (2 matches), Australasia, and New Zealand. Lomas captained the successful first British tour of the Southern Hemisphere which began on 4 June 1910. He also represented England in 1910 against Wales.

=== 1910s ===
In January 1911 he joined Oldham from Salford for a fee of £300, (based on increases in average earnings, this would be approximately £104,600 in 2013). While there in 1911 he played for England against Wales, and Australia (2 matches). During the 1911–12 Kangaroo tour of Great Britain Lomas captained Great Britain in the second and third Ashes tests. Lomas also played in Oldham's 1912 Challenge Cup Final defeat by Dewsbury.

During Lomas' time there was Salford's 5-3 victory over Huddersfield in the Championship Final during the 1913–14 season. He had also represented Cumberland and Lancashire.

=== 1920s ===
As the coach of Salford, player shortages forced Lomas to play in some cup matches for Salford in the 1922–23 season, and in 1923–24 season he was again forced to make some appearances. His last match for Salford, aged 44, was against Wakefield Trinity on 29 September 1923. He continued in his coaching role at Salford until the 1925–26 season.

=== Statistics ===
Lomas was a prolific points scorer throughout his career, finishing with a total of 2,312 points in all competitions. Lomas' total points was an all-time career record until it was surpassed by Jim Sullivan during the 1928–29 season.

== Honours ==
=== Club ===
Maryport

Cumberland Senior League (1): 1899–1900

Oldham

Rugby League Championship: 1910–11

=== Representative ===
Lancashire

County Championship (3): 1902–03, 1903–04, 1905–06

Cumberland

County Championship (3): 1907–08, 1909–10, 1911–12

== Legacy ==
The Courtney Goodwill Trophy, international rugby league's first, was presented for the first time in 1936 and depicted Lomas, along with other pioneering greats of the code, Jean Galia (France), Albert Baskiville (New Zealand) and Dally Messenger (Australia). Lomas died in Manchester, England on 11 February 1960. He was the subject of a book, The King of Brilliance: James Lomas – a Rugby League Superstar, which was published in 2011.

Achievements
Preceded by	Rugby league transfer record Bramley to Salford; 1901–1911	Succeeded by James Lomas
Preceded by James Lomas	Rugby league transfer record Salford to Oldham; 1911–1913	Succeeded by Billy Batten
