= Edward Melling =

English rugby league footballer

- Ogden's Cigarette card featuring Edward Melling

Personal information
- Full name: Edward Melling
- Born: 1900; Wigan, England
- Died: unknown

Playing information
- Position: Scrum-half
Club
Years	Team	Pld	T	G	FG	P
1919	Batley	1	0	0	0	0
1920–28	Bradford Northern	286				339
1928–≥28	Broughton Rangers
	Total	287	0	0	0	339

Edward Melling (born 1900 – death unknown) was an English professional rugby league footballer who played in the 1910s and 1920s. He played at club level for Batley (whom he joined from the Wigan District in 1919, making his debut and only first team appearance v York (A) on 23 August 1919) Bradford Northern, and signed for Broughton Rangers on Wednesday 19 September 1928, as a scrum-half.

== Background ==
Teddy Melling was born in Wigan, Lancashire, England.

== Contemporaneous article extract ==
"E. Melling' Bradford (Northern Rugby league.) Born in Wigan in 1900, Edward Melling has proved himself a great utility player. His natural position is scrum half, but he can adapt himself to any position in the back division. He first played for Batley, but Bradford were keen to secure his services, and he went to them and has been one of the mainstays of the team. He has been the leading scorer in the last two seasons. In the season 1926-26 he missed only one out of 47 League and Cup matches"
