= 1906–07 Northern Rugby Football Union season =

- League: Championship
- Teams: 26

1906–07 Season
- Champions: Halifax (2nd title)
- League Leaders: Halifax
- Runners-up: Oldham
- Top point-scorer: (England) James Lomas ( Salford) (280)
- Top try-scorer: (England) Percy Eccles ( Halifax) (41)
- Joined League: Liverpool City
- Resigned from League: Bradford F.C. Brighouse Rangers; Castleford; Normanton; Millom; Morecambe

The 1906–07 Northern Rugby Football Union season was the 12th season of rugby league football.

== Rule changes ==
During a meeting held on 12 June 1906 at the George Hotel, Huddersfield, the members of the Northern Union agreed to adopt two rule changes that would distinguish the sport thereafter. The Northern Union, motivated by the need to appeal to spectators to improve the game's finances and ensure its survival, and inspired by the attacking style of rugby displayed by the New Zealand rugby union team during their 1905 tour of Britain, revisited two areas of the game that were the focus of much debate: the optimum number of players per team and how play should continue once a tackle had been completed.

- The play-the-ball rule was introduced. Previously after each tackle had been completed or a player had been "held" the rules mandated that a scrum be ordered by the referee. These scrums had taken up a significant portion of game time and it was felt that the ball was hidden from spectators too often as a result, diminishing the game's entertainment value.

The play-the-ball restored the early rugby football principle that play does not carry on when the player is no longer standing, but that a tackle is complete when a player is "held" on the ground or while on their feet. The Yorkshire Post commented on 13 June 1906 that the, "proposals in the name of the Bradford Club, provided in effect for a return to the 'play the ball' rule". In New Zealand, a newspaper column in The Truth on 10 November 1906 while describing the sport to its readers wrote, "the most excellent rule, that was obliterated from the earlier laws of the Union has again been introduced, 'That a player, when collared, must put the ball into play'."

This version of the play-the-ball was used until the 1927–28 season when it was replaced by a 1926 Australian development in which the play-the-ball consisted of two defensive markers, the tackled player and the acting half-back.

- The Northern Union reduced the number of players on a team from fifteen to thirteen following approval by the clubs of a proposal by Warrington. In New Zealand, a newspaper column in The Truth (10 November 1906) describing the sport noted the intention, "to make the game brighter from a spectacular view-point".

There had been support, stronger among northern clubs, for a reduction in the number of players before the 1895 schism but this had not been taken any further because of the Rugby Football Union's threats of sanctions as part of their campaign against professionalism. Since its founding, the NU had trialled games with different numbers of players at various times.

- If a ball was kicked out of play on the full, a scrum back where it had been kicked from would now be formed.

== Season summary ==
Halifax won their second Championship in this season and Warrington their second Challenge Cup in three years.

This season also saw the introduction of the Championship Play-offs at the end of the season. Similar to the current Grand Final system in today's Super League, it involved the top four clubs playing in two semi finals (1v4, 2v3) and then a final with the winners being declared champions. This system was used until 1961-62.

Liverpool City joined, but Brighouse Rangers, Castleford, Millom, Morecambe, and Normanton withdrew, reducing the competition to 27 teams. Pontefract resigned from the league and folded after 8 matches, and their record was expunged (8P 3W 5L 63PF 154PA).

Liverpool City became the first of only six teams to record no wins in a league season. Three of the others were in wartime leagues.

Bradford had been playing at the Park Avenue ground until this year. A decision by the Park Avenue Directors to form a professional association football (soccer) club forced Bradford rugby club to reform and relocate at Greenfield Stadium later adding "Northern" to their name.

There was no county league competition this season.

== Championship ==
	Team	Pld	W	D	L	PF	PA	Pts	Pct
1	Halifax	34	27	2	5	649	229	56	82.35
2	Oldham	34	26	1	7	457	227	53	77.94
3	Runcorn	30	23	0	7	546	216	46	76.66
4	Keighley	24	17	1	6	431	231	35	72.91
5	Wigan	34	23	1	10	656	278	47	69.11
6	Leeds	30	19	2	9	424	301	40	66.66
7	Hunslet	32	21	0	11	520	354	42	65.62
8	Warrington	34	21	1	12	554	304	43	63.23
9	Broughton Rangers	30	17	1	12	496	235	35	58.33
10	Salford	32	18	0	14	462	349	36	56.25
11	Barrow	26	13	1	12	333	356	27	51.92
12	Widnes	20	9	1	10	221	320	19	47.50
13	Hull Kingston Rovers	32	15	0	17	390	366	30	46.87
14	Dewsbury	28	12	1	15	393	377	25	44.64
15	Leigh	28	12	1	15	318	311	25	44.64
16	Wakefield Trinity	28	12	1	15	348	409	25	44.64
17	Swinton	32	14	0	18	308	380	28	43.75
18	Bradford	30	12	2	16	387	367	26	43.33
19	Huddersfield	32	13	0	19	469	477	26	40.62
20	Rochdale Hornets	26	9	1	16	292	312	19	36.53
21	Batley	24	8	1	15	228	326	17	35.41
22	St. Helens	26	9	0	17	374	353	18	34.61
23	Hull	32	11	0	21	337	515	22	34.37
24	York	24	5	0	19	217	514	10	20.83
25	Bramley	20	1	0	19	85	466	2	5.00
26	Liverpool City	30	0	0	30	76	1398	0	0.00
27	Pontefract	Club folded, record expunged							N/A

Play-offs

== Championship play-off ==
Semi-finals
1	Halifax	9
4	Keighley	4
2	Oldham	11
3	Runcorn	3

Championship final
Halifax	18
Oldham	3

== Challenge Cup ==
Warrington beat Oldham 17-3 in the final at Wheater's Field, Broughton, Salford before a crowd of 18,500 to win their second Cup in three seasons.

== County cups ==
Broughton Rangers beat Warrington 15–6 to win the Lancashire Cup, and Bradford F.C. beat Hull Kingston Rovers 8–5 to win the Yorkshire County Cup.

== Sources ==
- 1906-07 Rugby Football League season at wigan.rlfans.com
- The Challenge Cup at The Rugby Football League website
