= Eric Ayles =

English rugby league footballer

Personal information
- Full name: Eric Ayles
- Born: 21 February 1928 Wigan, Lancashire, England
- Died: 26 May 1972 (aged 44) Wigan, Lancashire, England

Playing information
- Position: Prop forward
Club
Years	Team	Pld	T	G	FG	P
1947–53	Belle Vue Rangers	227
1953–56	St Helens	48	4	0	0	12
1956–58	Salford	71	4	0	0	12
	Total	346	8	0	0	24
Representative
Years	Team	Pld	T	G	FG	P
1952–53	Lancashire	2	0	0	0	0

Eric Ayles (21 February 1928 – 26 May 1972) was an English professional rugby league footballer who played as a prop forward in the 1940s and 1950s. He played at representative level for Lancashire, and at club level for Belle Vue Rangers, St Helens and Salford. He was crushed and killed by a piece of concrete in 1972.

== Playing career ==
Ayles started his professional career with Belle Vue Rangers before signing for St Helens in September 1953.

In March 1956, he joined Salford on loan, before signing a permanent deal with the club in August 1956 for an estimated fee of £350.

Ayles dislocated his shoulder in a match against Workington Town in April 1958, which forced him to retire.

== Representative honours ==
Ayles made two appearances for Lancashire while at Belle Vue Rangers.
