= 2007 Challenge Cup final =

Rugby league match in the United Kingdom

2007 Challenge Cup Final
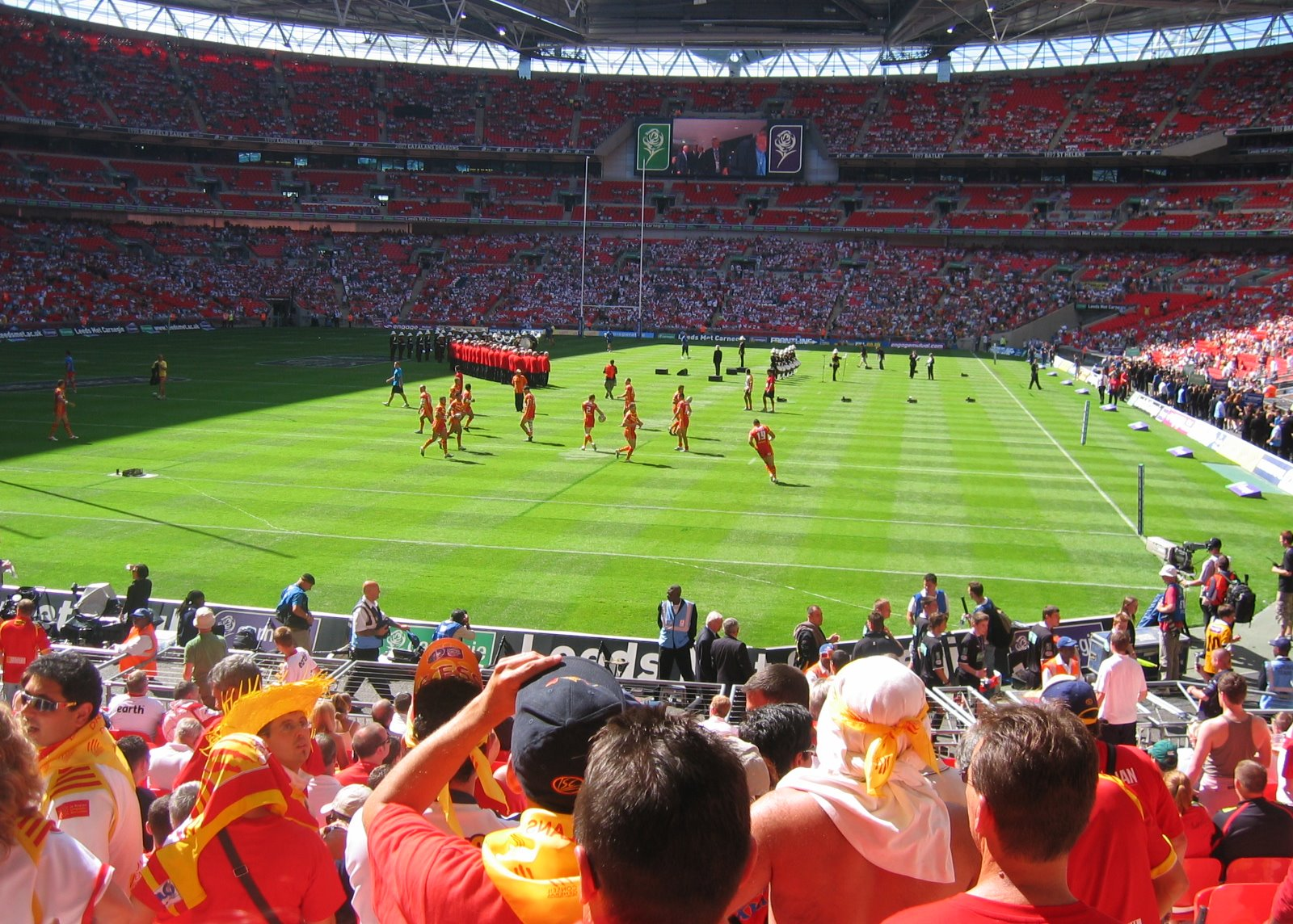
- Pre-match at the 2007 Challenge Cup Final
St. Helens	Catalans Dragons
30	8
	1	2	Total
STH	12	18	30
CAT	4	4	8
- Date: 25 August 2007
- Stadium: Wembley Stadium
- Location: London, United Kingdom
- Lance Todd Trophy winner: Leon Pryce and Paul Wellens
- Anthems: God Save The Queen and Abide with Me
- Referee: Ashley Klein
- Attendance: 84,241

Broadcast partners
- Broadcasters: BBC Sport

The 2007 Carnegie Challenge Cup Final was played by the holders St Helens and the Catalans Dragons at the new Wembley Stadium on 25 August 2007. The Dragons were the first French club ever to take part in the competition's final. After a competitive game, St Helens won the competition with a 30 - 8 victory.

== Return to Wembley ==
Wembley Stadium is the traditional home of most major sports finals in England, including Rugby League's Challenge Cup Final. The original Wembley Stadium has a hosted the Challenge Cup Final almost every year since the 1929 Challenge Cup Final where Wigan Warriors beat Dewsbury Rams 13 – 2. The only exception to Wembley hosting the final was during the Second World War where a variety of stadiums were used to host the final and during 1932 where Central Park in Wigan hosted the final. However in 2000, the Challenge Cup Final moved out of Wembley in preparation for the start of the building of the new stadium in 2003. During this time Murrayfield, Twickenham, and the Millennium Stadium were used to host the final. In 2007 the final returned to Wembley along with most major English sporting finals.

== Route to the final ==
=== St Helens ===
St Helens began their Challenge Cup campaign with a fourth round 78–14 thrashing of National League One side Batley Bulldogs before going on to thrash another National League One side Rochdale Hornets 70 points to 10 in the fifth round. The quarter finals saw a comfortable victory over Super League side Warrington Wolves before another comfortable victory over title rivals Bradford Bulls put them in the final.

Round	Opposition	Score
4th	Batley Bulldogs (H)	78–14
5th	Rochdale Hornets (H)	70–10
QF	Warrington Wolves (H)	25–14
SF	Bradford Bulls (N)	35–14

=== Catalans Dragons ===
Catalans Dragons began their Challenge Cup campaign with a thrashing of 2007 National League Two side Featherstone Rovers 70 points to 12. A fifth round victory over Whitehaven saw the Dragons progress to the quarter-finals where a narrow away win over Hull F.C., 26 points to 23, put them in the semi-finals. A comfortable win against Wigan Warriors of 37 points to 24 placed the Dragons in their first ever Challenge Cup Final.

Round	Opposition	Score
4th	Featherstone Rovers (H)	70–12
5th	Whitehaven (A)	24–14
QF	Hull F.C. (A)	26–23
SF	Wigan Warriors (N)	37–24

== Match details ==
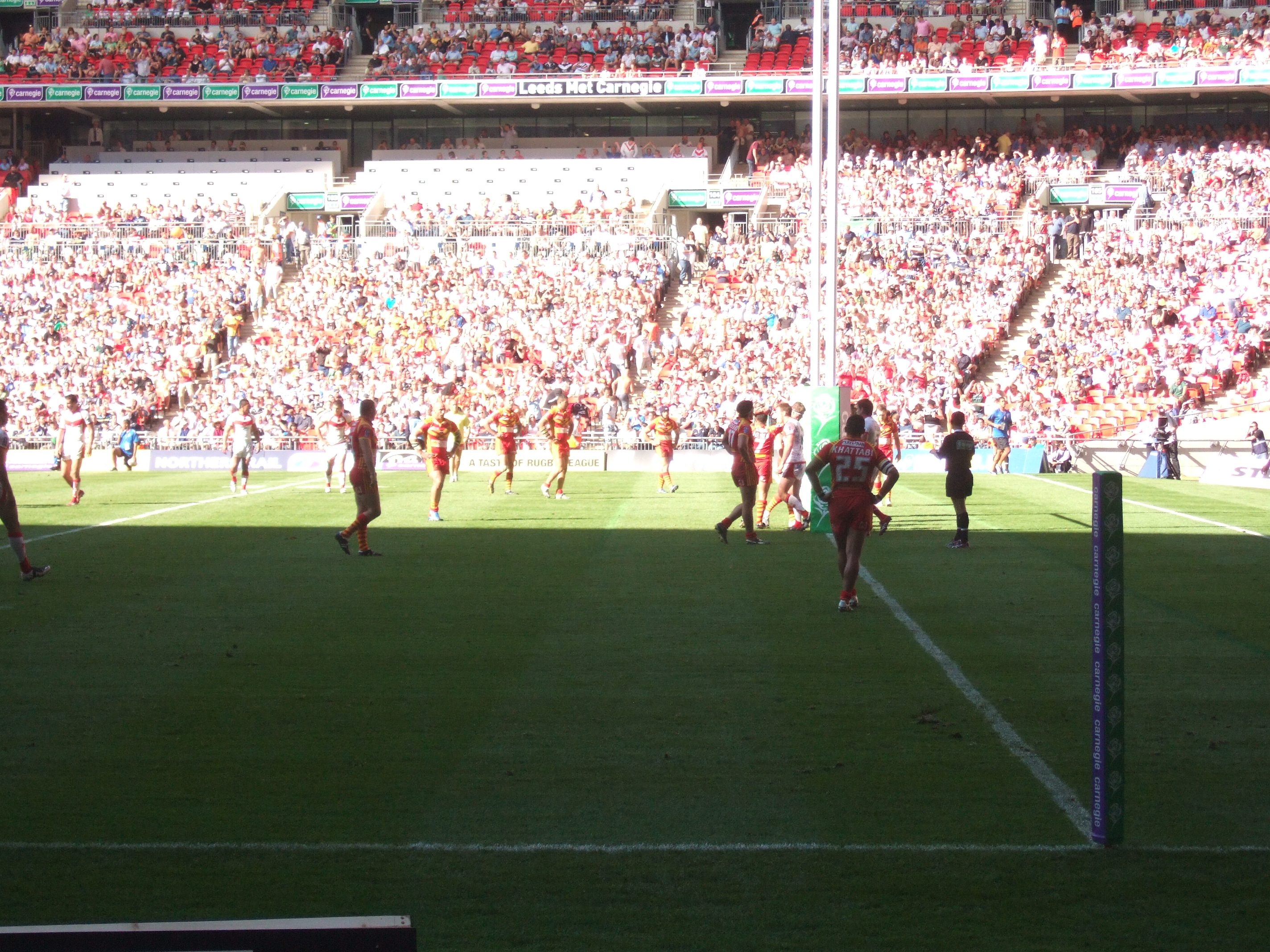
During the match

August 25, 2007

St. Helens	30 - 8	Catalans Dragons
Tries: Roby 33'; Gardner (2) 40', 78'; Wellens 46'; Clough 50'; Goals: Long (5)	(Report)	Tries: Khattabi 35'; Murphy 56'

Wembley Stadium, London
Attendance: 84,241
Referee: Ashley Klien
Player of the Match: Leon Pryce and Paul Wellens

The man-of-the-match award was shared by Leon Pryce and Paul Wellens.

Teams: St Helens: Paul Wellens, Ade Gardner, Matt Gidley, Willie Talau, Francis Meli; Leon Pryce, Sean Long, Nick Fozzard, Keiron Cunningham, Jason Cayless, Lee Gilmour, Mike Bennett, Jon Wilkin
Subs: James Roby, James Graham, Paul Clough, Maurie Fa'asavalu Coach: Daniel Anderson

Catalans: Clint Greenshields, Justin Murphy, John Wilson, Sébastien Raguin, Younes Khattabi, Adam Mogg, Stacey Jones (c), Jérôme Guisset, Luke Quigley, Alex Chan, Jason Croker, Cyrille Gossard, Grégory Mounis
Subs: Rémi Casty, David Ferriol, Vincent Duport, Kane Bentley Coach: Mick Potter

== Notable attendees ==
The following attended the final:

- Mal Meninga
- Andrew Johns
- Joe Lydon
- Shaun Edwards
- Sir Steve Redgrave

== See also ==
- 2007 Challenge Cup
