= Dan Smith (rugby league) =

Welsh international rugby league footballer

Personal information
- Born: unknown
- Died: unknown

Playing information
- Position: Fullback
Club
| Years | Team | Pld | T | G | FG | P |
|---|---|---|---|---|---|---|
| 1897–04 | Salford |
Representative
| Years | Team | Pld | T | G | FG | P |
| 1904 | Other Nationalities | 1 | 0 | 0 | 0 | 0 |

Dan Smith (birth unknown – death unknown) was a Welsh professional rugby league footballer who played in the 1900s. He played at representative level for the Other Nationalities, and at club level for Salford, as a fullback. Smith appeared on the losing side in three Challenge Cup finals; in the 1899–1900, 1901–02 and 1902–03 seasons.

== Playing career ==
=== Salford ===
Smith made his debut for Salford in 1897, having joined the club from Welsh rugby union side Swansea RFC.

Smith played fullback in Salford's 8–16 defeat by Swinton in the 1900 Challenge Cup Final during the 1899–1900 season at Fallowfield Stadium, Manchester, in front of a crowd of 17,864, and played fullback in the 0–25 defeat by Broughton Rangers in the 1902 Challenge Cup final, during the 1901–02 season at Athletic Grounds, Rochdale, in front of a crowd of 15,006, and played fullback the 0–7 defeat by Halifax in the 1903 Challenge Cup final, during the 1902–03 season at Headingley, Leeds, in front of a crowd of 32,507.

Following the end of the 1903–04 season, Smith emigrated to Canada.

=== International honours ===
Smith won a cap as a fullback for the Other Nationalities in their 9–3 victory over England at Central Park, Wigan on Tuesday 5 April 1904. This was the first ever international rugby league match.
