= 1901–02 Challenge Cup =

Rugby league competition

1902 Challenge Cup
- Duration: 6 rounds
- Highest attendance: 15,006
- Winners: Broughton Rangers
- Runners-up: Salford

The 1902 Challenge Cup was the 6th staging of rugby league's oldest knockout competition, the Challenge Cup. It featured clubs from England's 1901-02 Northern Rugby Football Union season.

== First round ==
Date	Team One	Score	Team Two
15 March 1902	Altrincham	12–4	Carnforth
15 March 1902	Askam	0–3	Widnes
15 March 1902	Aspatria	2–4	Rochdale Hornets
15 March 1902	Batley	8–4	Brighouse Rangers
15 March 1902	Castleford	15–7	Hebden Bridge
15 March 1902	Dewsbury	10–3	Manningham
15 March 1902	Featherstone	0–38	Todmorden
15 March 1902	Halifax	0–2	Swinton
15 March 1902	Heckmondwike	5–0	Birkenhead
15 March 1902	Holbeck	29–8	Alverthorpe
15 March 1902	Hull FC	28–0	York
15 March 1902	Hull Kingston Rovers	7–0	St Helens
15 March 1902	Hunslet	37–0	Wath Brow Hornets
15 March 1902	Keighley	7–15	Broughton Rangers
15 March 1902	Kendal Hornets	0–22	Huddersfield
15 March 1902	Kirkstall	3–0	Eastmoor
15 March 1902	Leigh	2–2	Runcorn
15 March 1902	Maryport	0–27	Oldham
15 March 1902	Ossett	5–2	Seaton Rangers
15 March 1902	Otley	0–5	Leeds
15 March 1902	Outwood Church	5–5	Morecambe
15 March 1902	Penrith Utd	0–2	Whitehaven Recs
15 March 1902	Radcliffe	6–7	Goole
15 March 1902	Salford	28–2	Pontefract
15 March 1902	South Shields	5–23	Bradford
15 March 1902	Stockport	18–2	Liversedge
15 March 1902	Wakefield Trinity	5–2	Normanton
15 March 1902	Warrington	6–0	Barrow
15 March 1902	Werneth	4–6	Lancaster
15 March 1902	Wigan	2–0	Bramley
15 March 1902	Windhill	5–0	Millom
19 March 1902 - replay	Morecambe	15–0	Outwood Church
19 March 1902 - replay	Runcorn	8–0	Leigh

== Second round ==
Date	Team One	Score	Team Two
22 March 1902	Altrincham	0–16	Batley
22 March 1902	Broughton Rangers	5–0	Stockport
22 March 1902	Castleford	16–0	Wigan
22 March 1902	Dewsbury	0–2	Salford
22 March 1902	Goole	3–3	Kirkstall
22 March 1902	Heckmondwike	7–5	Holbeck
22 March 1902	Hull Kingston Rovers	5–10	Hull FC
22 March 1902	Idle	5–5	Whitehaven Recs
22 March 1902	Lancaster	2–7	Hunslet
22 March 1902	Morecambe	6–17	Swinton
22 March 1902	Ossett	15–2	Todmorden
22 March 1902	Rochdale Hornets	9–19	Huddersfield
22 March 1902	Runcorn	10–0	Oldham
22 March 1902	Warrington	0–11	Bradford
22 March 1902	Widnes	16–7	Wakefield Trinity
22 March 1902	Windhill	0–31	Leeds
26 March 1902 - replay	Kirkstall	0–3	Goole
26 March 1902 - replay	Whitehaven Recs	6–3	Idle

== Third round ==
Date	Team One	Score	Team Two
29 March 1902	Batley	15–10	Bradford
29 March 1902	Broughton Rangers	13–2	Hull FC
29 March 1902	Castleford	6–5	Runcorn
29 March 1902	Heckmondwike	7–4	Ossett
29 March 1902	Huddersfield	11–0	Leeds
29 March 1902	Salford	67–0	Goole
29 March 1902	Swinton	34–0	Whitehaven Recs
29 March 1902	Widnes	5–5	Hunslet
2 April 1902 - replay	Hunslet	21–0	Widnes

== Quarterfinals ==
Date	Team One	Score	Team Two
5 April 1902	Batley	21–2	Castleford
5 April 1902	Broughton Rangers	13–0	Swinton
5 April 1902	Heckmondwike	2–2	Hunslet
5 April 1902	Huddersfield	6–9	Salford
5 April 1902 - replay	Hunslet	6–2	Heckmondwike

== Semifinals ==
Date	Team One	Score	Team Two
12 April 1902	Hunslet	5–9	Broughton Rangers
12 April 1902	Salford	8–0	Batley

== Final ==
The final was contested by the Broughton Rangers and Salford at the Athletic Grounds in Rochdale.

The final was played on Saturday 26 April 1902, where Broughton beat Salford 25–0 at Rochdale in front of a crowd of 15,006.

26 April 1902

Broughton Rangers	25 – 0	Salford
	Report

Athletic Grounds, Rochdale
Attendance: 15,006

1	J. Fielding
2	A. Widdeson
3	Frank Harry
4	Robert Wilson (c)
5	Andrew Hogg
6	Willie James
7	Sam James
8	H. Woodhead
9	George Woodhead
10	Billy Winskill
11	Stead
12	Bill Oram
13	Jim Trotter
14	J. Garrety
15	Charlie Thompson

1	Dan Smith
2	Ernest Bone
3	Tom Williams
4	Dai Davies
5	Horace Price
6	James Lomas
7	Ben Griffiths
8	Jack Rhapps
9	Pat Tunney
10	George Heath
11	William Brown
12	Herbert Buckler
13	Robert Shaw
14	Jack Williams
15	Miles Gledhill
