= 1899–1900 Challenge Cup =

Rugby league competition

1900 Challenge Cup
- Duration: 6 Rounds
- Number of teams: 62
- Highest attendance: 17,864
- Winners: Swinton
- Runners-up: Salford

The 1900 Challenge Cup was the 4th staging of rugby league's oldest knockout competition, the Challenge Cup.

The final was contested by Swinton and Salford at Fallowfield Stadium in Manchester on Saturday 28 April 1900. Swinton won 16–8 in front of a crowd of 17,864. The cup was presented by Mrs Smith, wife of the President of the Northern Union.

== First round ==
The 30 ties of the first round were all played on Saturday 17 March 1900. 64 teams had been in the draw but Holbeck and Bramley received byes as their opponents, Whitehaven Town and Rothwell respectively withdrew from the competition before the games were played.

Home	Score	Away
Altrincham	24–0	Pontefract
Alverthorpe	2–8	Workington
Barrow	2–3	Bradford
Birkenhead	4–6	Werneth
Brighouse Rangers	16–5	Todmorden
Broughton Rangers	22–7	Lancaster
Castleford	0–0	Batley
Dewsbury	3–0	Wigan
Featherstone	2–19	Halifax
Goole	8–6	Heckmondwike
Hebden Bridge	0–15	Wakefield Trinity
Huddersfield	22–0	Idle
Hull FC	52–0	Wath Brow Hornets
Hull Kingston Rovers	3–0	Millom
Kendal Hornets	0–9	Maryport
Leeds Parish Church	5–0	Seaton Rangers
Liversedge	8–12	Leigh
Manningham	3–3	Oldham
Morecambe	19–0	Whitehaven Recreation
Normanton	5–0	Leeds
Ossett	5–0	Elland
Outwood Church	5–24	Widnes
Radcliffe	13–0	Whitworth
Runcorn	42–0	Birstall
St Helens	0–6	Warrington
Salford	9–0	York
Stockport	2–0	Hunslet
Swinton	53–0	Eastmoor
Tyldesley	12–0	Brookland
Windhill	0–11	Rochdale Hornets

The two drawn matches were replayed on Tuesday 20 March; Batley beat Castleford 5–0 and Oldham beat Manningham 18–3.

== Second round ==
The second-round games were played on Saturday 24 March 1900.

Home	Score	Away
Altrincham	3–15	Leeds Parish Church
Bradford	12–0	Ossett
Bramley	8–5	Hull FC
Brighouse Rangers	0–4	Wakefield Trinity
Dewsbury	0–2	Widnes
Halifax	5–10	Oldham
Holbeck	8–17	Swinton
Huddersfield	13–0	Workington
Leigh	2–9	Salford
Morecambe	0–7	Broughton Rangers
Normanton	0–3	Batley
Radcliffe	2–0	Werneth
Rochdale Hornets	13–5	Hull Kingston Rovers
Runcorn	12–0	Maryport
Stockport	5–2	Tyldesley
Warrington	44–0	Goole

== Third round ==
The third round matches were played on Saturday 31 March 1900.

Home	Score	Away
Bradford	0–0	Runcorn
Bramley	3–3	Widnes
Broughton Rangers	5–3	Wakefield Trinity
Leeds Parish Church	7–2	Batley
Rochdale Hornets	3–0	Warrington
Salford	6–5	Huddersfield
Stockport	24–3	Radcliffe
Swinton	14–2	Oldham

The Widnes v Bramley tie was replayed on Tuesday 3 April with Widnes winning 8–0. Runcorn and Bradford replayed their game the following evening and drew again, this time 3–3. With the quarter-finals to be played on the following Saturday, the two clubs had to play a second replay on the following, Thursday, evening. In this third meeting Runcorn came out on top 6–2 in a match played on neutral ground at Broughton Rovers.

== Quarter-finals ==
Saturday 7 April 1900 saw the four quarter final games played.

Home	Score	Away
Leeds Parish Church	5–5	Runcorn
Salford	11–3	Rochdale Hornets
Stockport	0–3	Widnes
Swinton	9–0	Broughton Rangers

Leeds parish Church and Runcorn replayed the match on 11 April and Leeds Parish Church won 8–6.

== Semifinals ==
The semi finals were played on 14 April 1900

Home	Score	Away	Venue
Salford	11–0	Widnes	Watersheddings, Oldham
Swinton	8–0	Leeds Parish Church	Fartown, Huddersfield

== Final ==
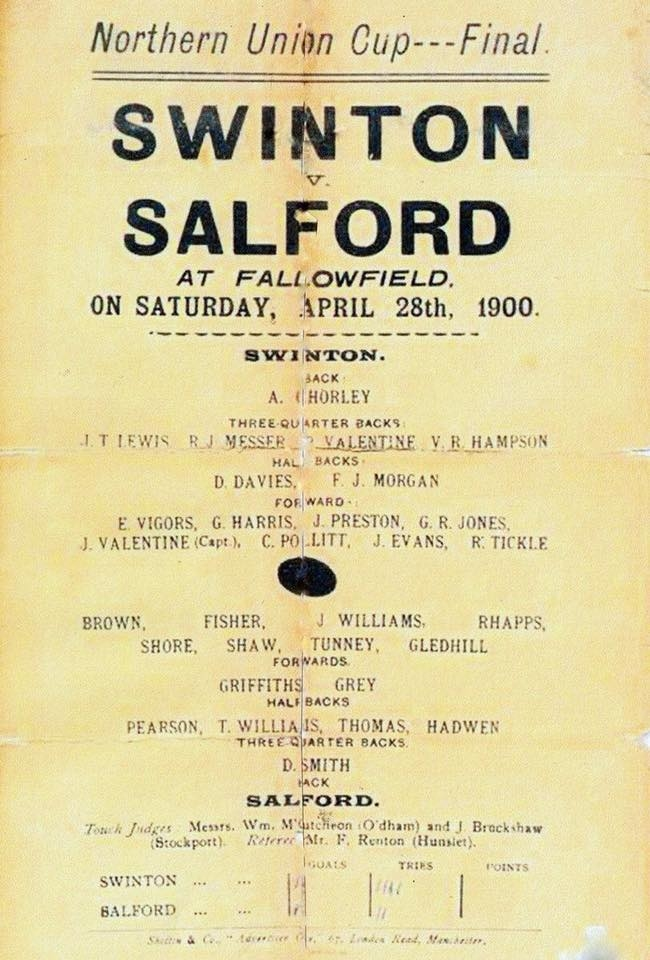
Handbill distributed at the final giving the names of the players and officials

28 April 1900

Swinton	16 – 8	Salford
Try: Davies, Lewis, Messer, R. Valentine; Goal: J. Valentine (2)	Report	Try: Pearson, T. Williams; Goal: Griffiths

Fallowfield, Manchester
Attendance: 17,864
Referee: F. Renton (Hunslet)

1	Alf Chorley
2	Jack Lewis
3	Bobby Messer
4	Bob Valentine
5	Vernon Hampson
6	Dai Davies
7	Joey Morgan
8	Evan Vigors
9	George Harris
10	Jack Preston
11	Dick Jones
12	Jim Valentine
13	Charlie Pollitt
14	Jack Evans
15	Ben Murphy

1	Dan Smith
2	Arthur Pearson
3	Tom Williams
4	E. T. Harter
5	Herbert Hadwen
6	Ben Griffiths
7	Ivor Grey
8	Hugh Shore
9	Robert Shaw
10	Pat Tunney
11	Miles Gledhill
12	William Brown
13	George Fisher
14	Jack Williams
15	Jack Rhapps
