= Double (rugby league) =

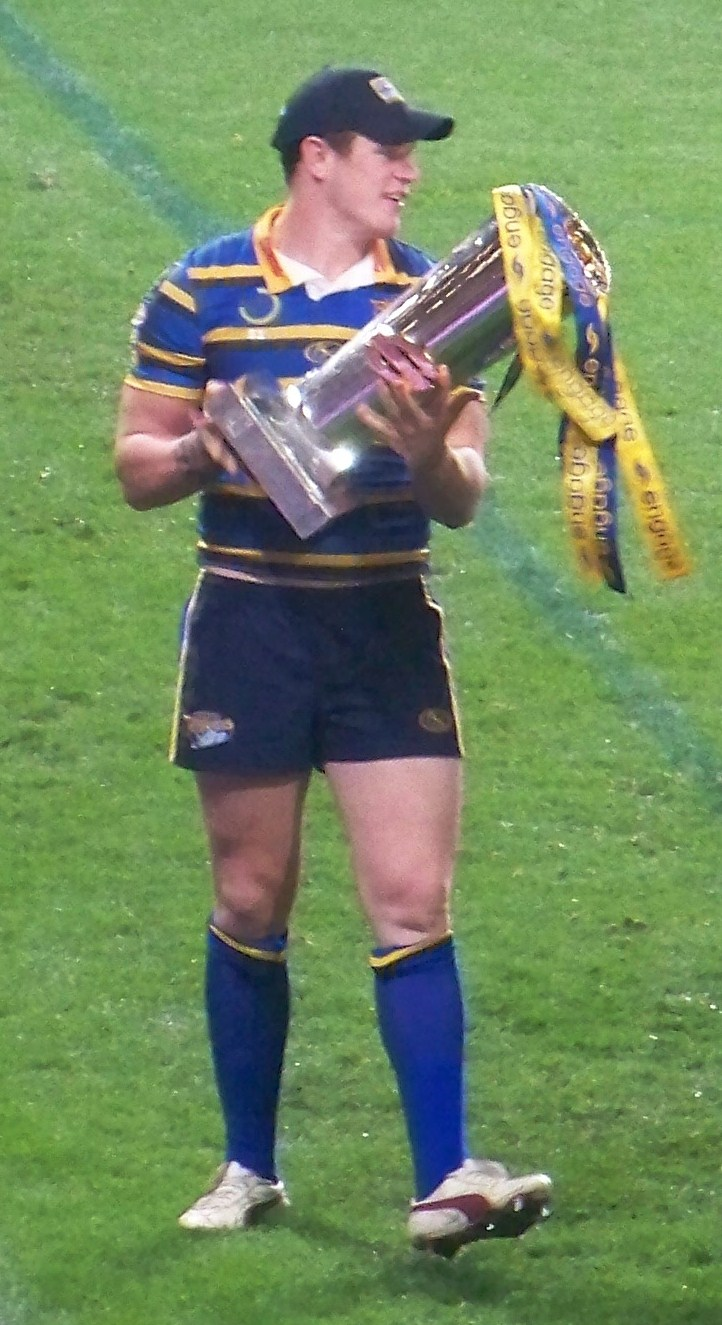
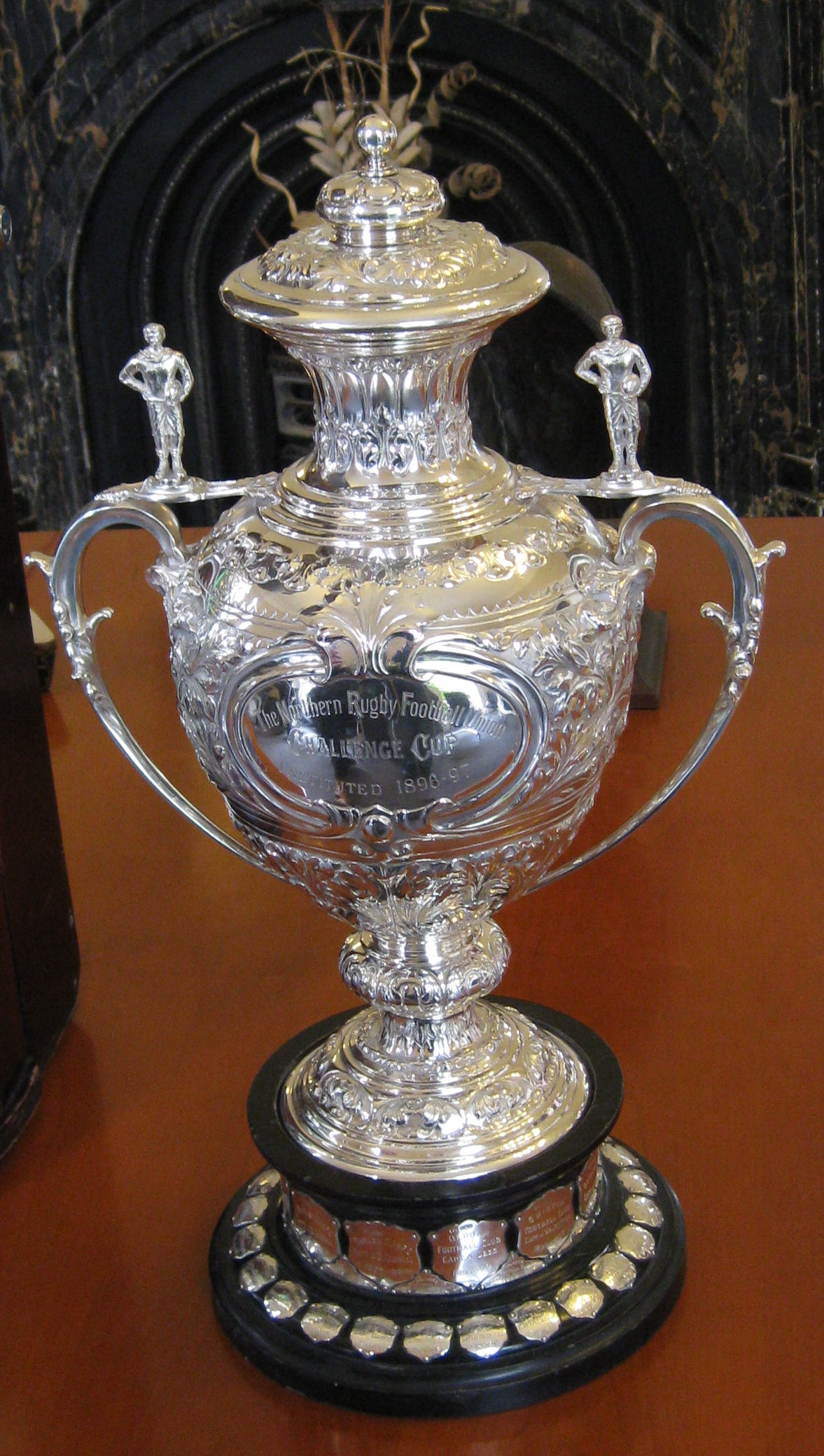
Trophies of the Super League and Challenge Cup, the current British rugby league double.

In British rugby league, winning The Double refers to winning the League Championship, currently the Super League, and the Challenge Cup in the same season.

Nine teams have won the double, the first being Broughton Rangers in 1902. Wigan Warriors are the most successful side having won a record 8 doubles.

== Men's doubles ==
=== Bradford Bulls ===
==== 2003 ====
Bradford Bulls achieved the double in 2003 beating Leeds Rhinos 22–20 in the Challenge Cup and then going on to beat Wigan Warriors 25–12 in the Grand Final. They also completed their only treble this year.

=== Broughton Rangers ===
==== 1901–02 ====
Broughton Rangers were the first team to record a league and cup double by finishing top of the Rugby Football League Championship With 43 points and beating Salford Red Devils 25–0 at Rochdale in the Challenge Cup. This would be their only double before they disbanded In 1955.

=== Halifax ===
==== 1902–03 ====
Halifax won their only double the year after Broughton won the first double in 1901–02. They finished top of the league with 49 points and beat Salford Red Devils 7–0 at Headingley Stadium. This was their only double recorded.

=== Huddersfield Giants ===
==== 1912–13 ====
Huddersfield Giants won their first of two doubles in 1913, finishing top of the league on points difference with Wigan Warriors and then went on to defeat them in the Championship Final 29–2. They completed their double by beating Warrington Wolves 9–5 in the Challenge Cup.

==== 1914–15 ====
Huddersfield went on to win their second double by beating Leeds in the Championship Final 35–2 and won the Challenge Cup beating St. Helens 37–3.

=== Hull KR ===
==== 2025 ====
Hull KR won their first double in 2025, defeating Warrington Wolves 8–6 in the 2025 Challenge Cup final, and beating Wigan Warriors 24–6 in the 2025 Super League Grand Final.

=== Hunslet ===
==== 1907–08 ====
Hunslet won All Four Cups and achieved the double beating Oldham 12–7 in the Championship Final and Beating Hull F.C. 14–0 In the Challenge Cup, which was their first cup final.

=== Leeds Rhinos ===
==== 2015 ====
Leeds won their first double in 2015 beating Hull Kingston Rovers in the Challenge Cup Final by a record winning margin of 50–0. They also won the treble this year after they beat Wigan Warriors 22–20 in the Super League Grand Final to become the first Leeds team to win the Cup and Grand Final in the same season.

=== St Helens ===
==== 1965–66 ====
St. Helens claimed their first double in 1966 beating Halifax 35–12 in the Championship Final and beat Wakefield Trinity 10–0 in the Challenge Cup final. This would be the first of three doubles won by the Saints.

==== 1996 ====
This was the first double won in the Super League era. St Helens finished top of the league and were crowned Champions of the first Super League season. They beat Bradford Bulls 40–32 in the Challenge Cup at Wembley.

==== 2006 ====
St Helens became the sixth team to win All Four Cups this year. They beat Huddersfield 42–12 in the Challenge Cup final and went on to beat Hull F.C. 26–4 in the Grand Final. The 2006 St Helens team became only the second rugby league team in history to win the BBC Sports Personality Team of the Year Award.

==== 2021 ====
St Helens won their fourth double in 2021, beating Catalans Dragons 12–10 in the Grand Final to successfully retaining their title and claim a third title in a row.

=== Swinton Lions ===
==== 1927–28 ====
Swinton Lions Won their only double in 1928 beating Featherstone Rovers 11–0 in the Championship Final as well as finishing top of the league during the regular season. They Beat Warrington Wolves 5–3 in the Challenge Cup final to complete their first double.

=== Warrington Wolves ===
==== 1953–54 ====
Warringtons only double came in 1954 when they beat Oldham 7–3 in the Championship Final and beat Halifax 8–4 in the Challenge Cup replay at Odsal.

=== Wigan Warriors ===
==== 1989–90 to 1995–96 ====
Wigan Warriors made history in the 1990s by winning a record 6 consecutive doubles between 1989–90 to 1995–96, the last season of winter rugby league before the introduction of Super League.

==== 2013 ====
Wigan won their seventh double in 2013 by beating Hull F.C. 16–0 in the Challenge Cup final. They then went on to beat Warrington Wolves 30–16 in the Grand Final to become only the third team in the Super League era to win the double.

==== 2024 ====
Wigan won their eighth double as part of a Grand Slam. The first part of the double was defeating Warrington Wolves by 18–8 at Wembley in the Challenge Cup final, and completed the feat by beating Hull Kingston Rovers by 9–2 in the Super League Grand Final.

=== Winners by club ===
	Club	Wins	Winning years
1	Wigan Warriors	8	1990–91, 1991–92, 1992–93, 1993–94, 1994–95, 1995–96, 2013, 2024
2	St. Helens	4	1965–66, 1996, 2006, 2021
3	Huddersfield Giants	2	1912–13, 1914–15
4	Swinton Lions	1	1927–28
4	Broughton Rangers	1	1901–02
4	Halifax Panthers	1	1902–03
4	Hunslet	1	1907–08
4	Bradford Bulls	1	2003
4	Leeds Rhinos	1	2015
4	Hull Kingston Rovers	1	2025

== Women's Double ==
=== Featherstone Rovers ===
Featherstone Rovers were the first women's team in British rugby league to achieve the double in 2012 when they won the inaugural Challenge Cup and won the Championship final.

=== Thatto Heath Crusaders / St Helens ===
Thatto Heath Crusaders achieved the double twice when they won both league and cup trophies in 2013 and 2016. The team then won again under the new St Helens name in 2021.

=== Bradford Bulls ===
In 2017, Bradford Bulls became the third team to complete the women's double.

=== Leeds Rhinos ===
In 2019, Leeds Rhinos became the fourth team to complete the women's double.

=== Wigan Warriors ===
Wigan Warriors completed the treble in 2025, doing so as an amateur side with three semi-professional teams in the league.

=== Winners by club ===
	Club	Wins	Winning years
1	Thatto Heath Crusaders / St Helens	3	2013, 2016, 2021
2	Fetherstone Rovers	1	2012
2	Bradford Bulls	1	2017
2	Leeds Rhinos	1	2019
2	Wigan Warriors	1	2025

== Wheelchair Double ==
Club	No.	Years
Leeds Rhinos	1	2021
Halifax Panthers	1	2025

== In France ==
Similar to the UK, the double in French rugby league is achieved by winning the primary league competition, the Elite One Championship (French Rugby League Championship before 2002), and the primary cup competition, the Lord Derby Cup. The teams that have achieved this are as follows:

=== Winners by club ===
	Club	Wins	Winning years
1	Villeneuve	4	1963–64, 1998–99, 2001–02, 2002–03
1	Carcassonne	4	1945–46, 1966–67, 2011–12, 2023–24
3	Catalan	2	1968–69, 1984–85
3	Le Pontet	2	1985–86, 1987–88
3	St Estève	2	1992–93, 1997–98
3	Union Treiziste Catalane	2	2000–01, 2004–05
3	Pia	2	2005–06, 2006–07
3	Lézignan	2	2009–10, 2010–11
9	Marseille	1	1948–49
9	Toulouse	1	2013–14

== See also ==
- Treble (rugby league)
- All Four Cups
