= Jack Prosser =

- Full name: Frederick John Prosser
- Born: 15 December 1892 Newport, Wales
- Died: 15 June 1947 (aged 54) Llandough, Wales

Rugby union career
- Position: Prop
International career
Years	Team	Apps	(Points)
1921	Wales	1	(0)

Frederick John Prosser (15 December 1892 – 15 June 1947) was a Welsh international rugby union player.

A Cardiff front row forward, Prosser gained his solitary Wales cap during the 1921 Five Nations Championship when he appeared against Ireland at Belfast, deputising for Wilfred Hodder. He later played with Penarth.

Prosser was a policeman by profession.

== See also ==
- List of Wales national rugby union players
