= John Flynn (rugby league) =

Personal information
- Full name: John Flynn
- Born: 1884 Whitehaven, England
- Died: 4 May 1918 (aged 34) France

Playing information
- Position: Scrum-half
Club
Years	Team	Pld	T	G	FG	P
1904–06	Swinton Lions	61	4	21		54
1906–10	Broughton Rangers
1911–14	Swinton Lions	19	3	0	0	9
	Total	80	7	21	0	63
Representative
Years	Team	Pld	T	G	FG	P
1904–10	Cumberland	14	0	0	0	0
1908	England	1	0	0	0	0

John "Jack" Flynn (1884 in Whitehaven – 4 May 1918) was an English professional rugby league footballer who played in the 1900s. He played for his hometown club Whitehaven Recreation and Parton before attracting the attention of the professional clubs, and he signed for Swinton Lions in 1904.

He played at representative level for England, and at club level for Swinton Lions and Broughton Rangers, as a scrum-half.

== International honours ==
Flynn won a cap for England while at Broughton Rangers in the 18-16 victory over New Zealand at Central Park, Wigan, on Saturday 11 January 1908, during the 1907–1908 New Zealand rugby tour of Australia and Great Britain.
