= Jack Preston =

English international rugby league footballer (1878–1939)

John Preston
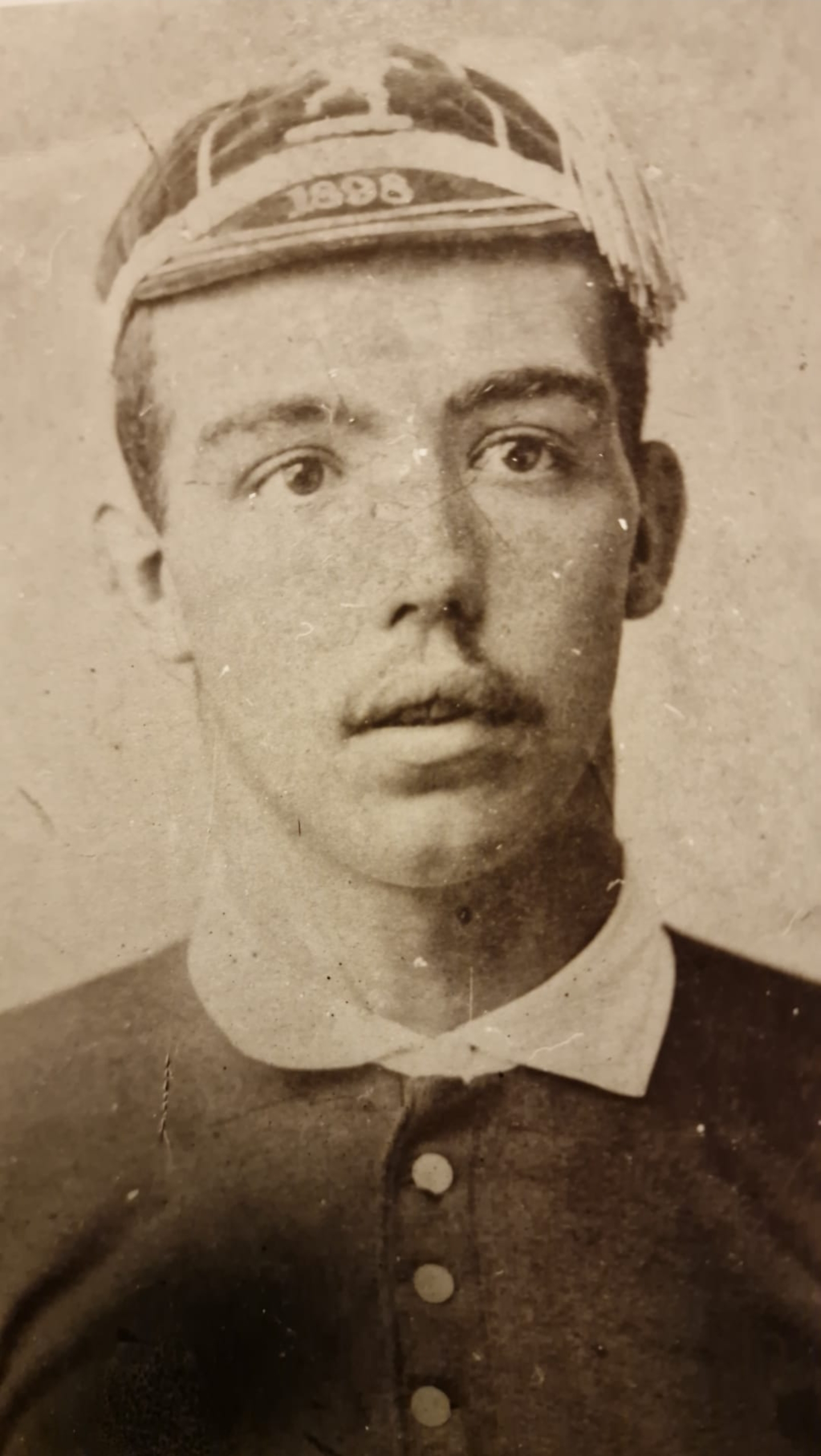
- Jack Preston sporting his England cap

Personal information
- Full name: John Preston
- Born: 31 March 1878 Lancashire, England
- Died: 1939 (aged 60–61) unknown

Playing information
- Position: Forward
Club
Years	Team	Pld	T	G	FG	P
1898–1904	Swinton	145	6	76	0	170
1904–07	Warrington	103	14	89	0	220
1908–10	Swinton	38	6	20	0	58
	Total	286	26	185	0	448
Representative
Years	Team	Pld	T	G	FG	P
1901–05	Lancashire	4	0	0	0	0
1905	England	1	0	0	0	0

John Preston (31 March 1878 – 1939) was an English professional rugby league footballer who played in the 1900s. He played at representative level for England and Lancashire, and at club level for Swinton and Warrington, as a forward.

== Playing career ==
=== Club career ===
Jack Preston was a goal kicking forward signed in 1904 from Swinton. He played in Swinton's 1900 Challenge Cup final win over Salford.

Jack Preston made his début for Warrington on Saturday 10 September 1904, he missed the 6–0 victory over Hull Kingston Rovers in the 1905 Challenge Cup Final through a knee injury, and he made his last appearance for Warrington on Saturday 28 September 1907.

He made 103 appearances for Warrington, scoring 14 tries and kicking 89 goals for 220 points.

In 1905/6 season he played in the first 40 matches of the season, only missing the final league match of the season.

In 1908 Jack returned home to Swinton playing a further 39 matches, scoring 6 tries and converting 20 goals.

=== Representative honours ===
Jack Preston won a cap for England while at Warrington in 1905 against Other Nationalities.

Jack Preston made 2 appearances for Lancashire, in the 1904/5 season.
