= Pat Tunney =

England international rugby league footballer

Personal information
- Full name: Patrick Tunney
- Born: 1 February 1872 Culduff, County Mayo, Ireland
- Died: 28 November 1949 (aged 77) Croxdale, County Durham, England

Playing information
- Position: Forward
Club
Years	Team	Pld	T	G	FG	P
1897–05	Salford	222	11	0	0	33
Representative
Years	Team	Pld	T	G	FG	P
1899–1904	Lancashire	18	0	2	0	6
1904	England	1	0	0	0	0

Patrick Tunney (1 February 1872 – 28 November 1949) was an Irish born, English professional rugby league footballer who played in the 1900s. He played at representative level for England, and at club level for Salford, as a forward.

== Playing career ==
=== Club career ===
Tunney played as a forward in Salford's 8–16 defeat by Swinton in the 1900 Challenge Cup Final during the 1899–1900 season at Fallowfield Stadium, Manchester, in front of a crowd of 17,864. He then played as Hooker in the 1902 Challenge cup final 0–25 defeat versus Broughton Rangers at Rochdale in front of a crowd of 15,006. He suffered his third defeat in 1903, playing at Prop Forward against Halifax at Headingley in front of 32,507 spectators, Halifax winning 7–0.

=== International honours ===
Tunney won a cap for England, he played as a forward in the 3–9 defeat by Other Nationalities at Central Park, Wigan on Tuesday 5 April 1904, in the first ever international rugby league match.

Tunney won 18 caps playing for Lancashire.
