= Arthur Ashworth =

New Zealand-born RAF officer (1920–1970)

Wing Commander Arthur 'Artie' Ashworth DSO, DFC and Bar, AFC and Bar
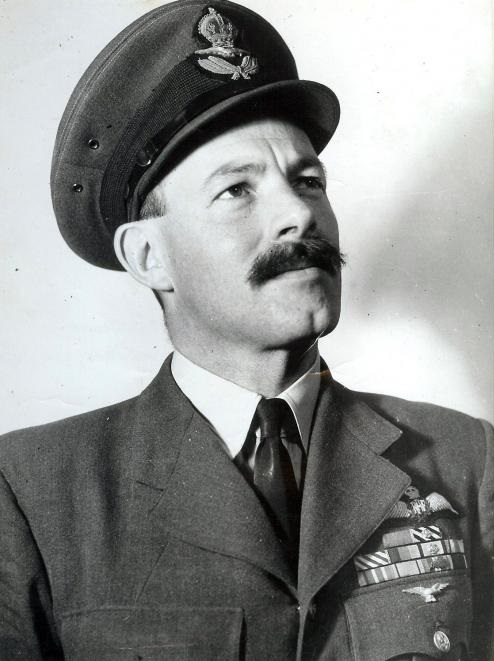
- Wing Commander Artie Ashworth
- Born: 3 May 1920; Gisborne, New Zealand
- Died: 19 February 1994 (aged 73); Bournemouth, England
- Military career
- Allegiance: New Zealand; United Kingdom
- Branch: Royal Air Force
- Service years: 1939–1967
- Rank: Wing Commander
- Service number: 43699
- Units: Pathfinder Force; No. 75 Squadron RAF; Bomber Command
- Commands: No. 38 Squadron RAF; No. 216 Squadron RAF; No. 139 Squadron RAF
- Awards: Distinguished Service Order; Distinguished Flying Cross & Bar; Air Force Cross & Bar; Mentioned in Despatches
- Website: arthurashworth.info

Arthur "Artie" Ashworth (3 May 1920 – 19 February 1994) was a New Zealand-born aviator who served with both the Royal New Zealand Air Force and the Royal Air Force. He completed over 100 operational sorties in World War II, later served in test and command roles post-war, and was decorated with the Distinguished Service Order, Distinguished Flying Cross & Bar, and Air Force Cross & Bar.

== Early life ==
Artie Ashworth was born in Gisborne, New Zealand, the seventh child of Arthur Ashworth Sr. and Edna Mary Ashworth (née Harrison).

His family moved several times in his early childhood, including a period on an experimental sheep farm in the Falkland Islands in 1927. Returning to New Zealand after the farm closed, Artie grew up near Alexandra, New Zealand, where he attended school, played rugby and tennis, and was a member of the Boy Scouts.

By 1937–38, Artie had completed parts of his University Entrance examinations and worked as a cadet clerk at the Public Works Department in Wellington. In September 1939, he applied for a Short-Term commission in the RNZAF, becoming one of the first men from Alexandra to do so.

He completed elementary and advanced flight training in New Zealand, flying aircraft including the de Havilland Tiger Moth, Vickers Vildebeest, and Fairey Gordon. In June 1940, he transferred to the RAF in England, beginning operational training on Avro Anson aircraft.

== Military career ==
=== Second World War ===
Artie Ashworth's early operational sorties were with No. 75 (NZ) Squadron.

=== 65th Sortie ===
In September 1944, Artie flew his 65th operational sortie to Saarbrücken, Germany, in a borrowed Vickers Wellington carrying flares and bombs to mark the target for the main bomber stream. During the mission, a flare in the bomb bay caught fire, producing sparks through the floor. He initially ordered the crew to bail out, but one parachute was accidentally taken by another crew member, leaving Artie without one.

Demonstrating skill and composure, he sideslipped the burning aircraft to lower altitude, extinguishing the fire. Using improvised navigation, he plotted a course back to England and restarted engines that had failed. He landed safely at RAF West Malling, and the missing parachute and flare were later recovered. This mission highlighted Artie's piloting expertise and calm under extreme pressure.

=== Pathfinder Force (Founder Member, Aug 1942 – Jan 1943) ===
Artie became a founder member of the Pathfinder Force and helped develop early target-marking tactics, including WANGANUI, PARRAMATTA, and NEWHAVEN, which could be used with H2S or OBOE. When using OBOE, methods were prefixed with "Musical" (e.g., Musical Wanganui). Flares could be red, yellow, or green to indicate primary or secondary targets.

=== Fighter pilot (Apr – Nov 1944) ===
Between April and November 1944, Artie flew Supermarine Spitfire and Hawker Tempest fighters on defensive and interception missions, becoming one of very few RAF pilots to fly both bombers and fighters.

=== Pathfinder Force return (Feb 1945 – End of War) ===
Artie returned to Pathfinder duties in February 1945 with No. 635 Squadron, flying de Havilland Mosquito aircraft to mark targets for bomber streams. By war's end, he had flown around 110 operational sorties and received a Bar to his DFC.

=== Promotions ===
- 8 June 1940 – Pilot Officer
- 8 June 1941 – Flying Officer (War substantive)
- 8 June 1942 – Flight Lieutenant (War substantive)
- 27 July 1942 – Acting Squadron Leader
- 1 July 1950 – Squadron Leader (permanent)
- 1 July 1956 – Wing Commander
- 31 August 1967 – Retired from RAF

=== Post-war RAF service ===
Artie served in advanced flying and instrument training, performance testing, and squadron command roles. He led No. 38 Squadron, No. 216 Squadron, and No. 139 (Jamaica) Squadron. In 1961, his son Corran was born.

== Retirement ==
After retiring in 1967, Artie decided to settle permanently in the United Kingdom, becoming a hotelier with his wife in southern England and maintained close ties with the RAF community.

== Death ==
Arthur Ashworth died 19 February 1994 in the United Kingdom from kidney failure, due to recurring malaria. He was survived by his wife Kay (died 2018) and son Corran (died 2007).

== Honours and awards ==
- Distinguished Flying Cross (DFC), 1941
- Distinguished Service Order (DSO), 1942
- Bar to DFC, 1945
- Air Force Cross (AFC), 1952
- Bar to AFC, 1956
- Mentioned in Despatches (MiD)

== See also ==
- Pathfinder Force
- No. 75 Squadron RAF
- Bomber Command
