= Liverpool City (1906) =

Club information
- Full name: Liverpool City Rugby League Football Club
- Nickname(s): All Blacks, Citizens
- Founded: 1906; 119 years ago
- Exited: 1907; 118 years ago

Former details
- Ground(s): Stanley Athletics Ground
- Competition: Rugby Football League

Uniforms
Home colours

Liverpool City was a semi-professional rugby league club. The club was based in the Stanley area of Liverpool, a metropolitan borough of Merseyside, England.

The club played in the Rugby League for only one season, in 1906–07.

== History ==
The club played in the Rugby League for the single season 1906–07, its first match being a 41–8 defeat at home to Wigan on 3 September 1906, watched by 1,000 spectators; the club's two tries both scored by J. H. Cooper. The club finished in bottom place out of the 26 clubs (Pontefract had folded after only 8 games and their records were expunged, but even they had won 3 of these 8 matches). The team lost all 30 official league matches played. It did draw one game, at home to Bramley, which at the time had also lost all of its matches in the season; the match ended 3–3, the points coming from one try each; Dunbobbin going over for the Citizens. However, as the return fixture was cancelled, the first (drawn) fixture was expunged from the records.

The club resolved to continue in 1907–08 in the West Lancashire Rugby League, but it was unable to fulfil its fixture commitments, and was wound up in November 1907.

Another club, also called Liverpool City was formed in 1951 when Liverpool Stanley changed their name and location. There is no connection between the two clubs.

== Colours ==
The club wore black jerseys with white collars and white shield with the Liver bird in black, and was known as the English "All Blacks".

== Ground ==
The club played at the Stanley Athletics Ground off Fairfield Street, Stanley.

== Records ==
The club holds, jointly, the record of playing a whole season without a win.

Lost all league matches in a season
Club	season	League	Cup	Ref
Liverpool City	1906-07	30 League**	2 Cup-ties	
Other clubs with the same equal record
Broughton Rangers	1940-41	10 War Lancashire League	1 Cup-tie	
Leigh	1940-41	13 War Lancashire League	1 Cup-tie	
Bramley	1941-42	19 War Emergency League	4 Cup-ties	
Runcorn Highfield	1989-90	28 Division Two	3 Cup-ties	
Nottingham City	1991-92	26 Division Three	3 Cup-ties	

== See also ==
- British rugby league system
- List of defunct rugby league clubs
