= 1910–11 Challenge Cup =

Rugby league competition

- Duration: 5 rounds
- Highest attendance: 8,000
- Winners: Broughton Rangers
- Runners-up: Wigan

The 1910–11 Challenge Cup was the 15th staging of rugby league's oldest knockout competition, the Challenge Cup.

The final was contested by the Broughton Rangers and Wigan at the Willows in Salford.

The final was played on Saturday 29 April 1911, where Broughton beat Wigan 4-0 at the Willows in front of a crowd of 8,000.

Broughton won their second, and to date, last Challenge Cup.

The scoreline set a record for the lowest winning score and lowest aggregate score in a Challenge Cup final.

== First round ==
Date	Team one	Team two	Score
18 Feb	Barrow	Hull FC	7-0
18 Feb	Batley	Ebbw Vale	7-2
18 Feb	Broughton Moor	Runcorn	6-23
18 Feb	Coventry	Warrington	10-18
18 Feb	Dewsbury	York Groves Utd	47-0
18 Feb	Halifax	York	63-0
18 Feb	Hull Kingston Rovers	Oldham	7-9
18 Feb	Keighley	Salford	0-5
18 Feb	Lane End Utd	Widnes	0-3
18 Feb	Leeds	Leigh	8-3
18 Feb	Normanton St John's	Broughton Rangers	6-10
18 Feb	Pemberton Rovers	Bradford Northern	4-12
18 Feb	Rochdale Hornets	Hunslet	11-5
18 Feb	St Helens	Bramley	26-7
18 Feb	Wakefield Trinity	Swinton	15-0
18 Feb	Wigan	Huddersfield	18-13

== Second round ==
Date	Team one	Team two	Score
04 Mar	Barrow	Salford	5-6
04 Mar	Broughton Rangers	Dewsbury	9-0
04 Mar	Halifax	Bradford Northern	5-7
04 Mar	Oldham	Wakefield Trinity	11-3
04 Mar	Rochdale Hornets	Widnes	8-0
04 Mar	Runcorn	Batley	3-9
04 Mar	St Helens	Leeds	6-11
04 Mar	Wigan	Warrington	21-2

== Quarterfinals ==
Date	Team one	Team two	Score
18 Mar	Broughton Rangers	Bradford Northern	10-0
18 Mar	Leeds	Wigan	4-13
18 Mar	Oldham	Rochdale Hornets	8-8
18 Mar	Salford	Batley	3-18
21 Mar	Rochdale Hornets	Oldham	4-3

== Semifinals ==
Date	Team one	Team two	Score
08 Apr	Batley	Wigan	2-4
08 Apr	Broughton Rangers	Rochdale Hornets	12-9

== Final ==
Date	Team one	Team two	Score
29 Apr	Broughton Rangers	Wigan	4-0
