= Broughton Rangers =

Defunct English professional rugby league club

Club information
- Colours: Blue, black and white
- Founded: 1877; 149 years ago (as Broughton Rangers)
- Exited: 1955; 71 years ago

Uniforms
Home colours

Records
- Champions: 1 (1901–02)
- Challenge Cups: 2 (1902, 1911)

Broughton Rangers were one of the twenty-one rugby clubs which met at the George Hotel, Huddersfield, in 1895 to form the Northern Rugby Football Union. They were originally based in Broughton, Salford, but in 1933 moved to Gorton, Manchester to play at the Belle Vue Stadium, and were renamed Belle Vue Rangers in 1946. The club folded in 1955.

== History ==
=== 1877–1905: Foundation ===
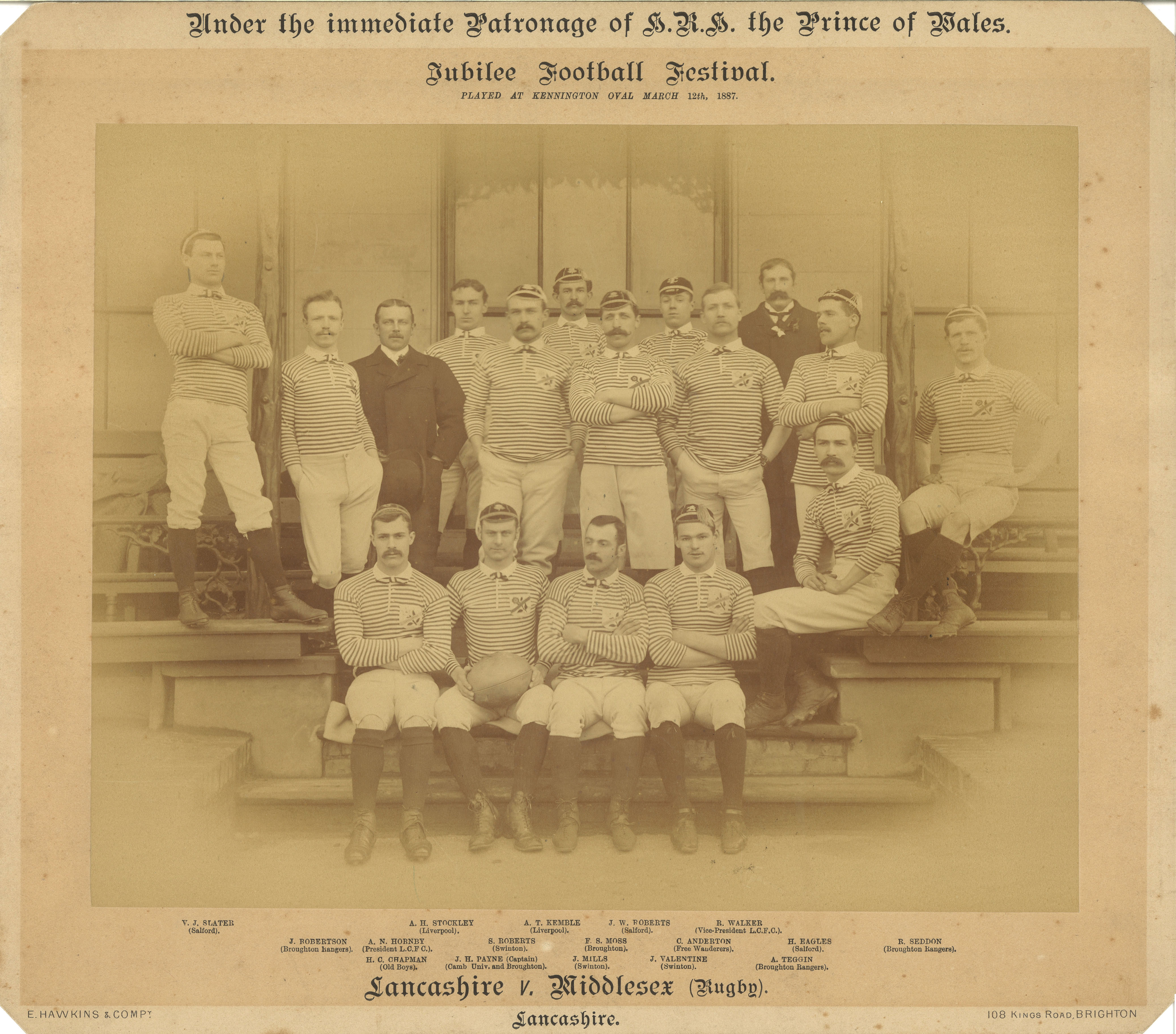
Broughton supplied four players for the Lancashire county rugby team in 1887

The club was founded in 1877 as Broughton and added Rangers for its second season. The club's headquarters was the Bridge Inn on Lower Broughton Road and home games were played at Wheater's Field. On 15 December 1888, Rangers lost to New Zealand Natives 8–0. From 1892 the headquarters was the Grosvenor Hotel on the corner of Great Clowes Street and Clarence Street.

A motion to join the Northern Union was moved by the club captain and carried unanimously. Broughton Rangers was one of 21 clubs which met at the George Hotel, Huddersfield on 29 August 1895 and formed the Northern Rugby Football Union. Broughton had a successful start in the Northern Union, winning the Lancashire League in 1896–97 and 1898–99. In 1901–02 the county leagues were amalgamated and Rangers were inaugural champions, securing the title by February and finishing 12 points ahead of Salford. Broughton secured the double, winning the Challenge Cup with a 25–0 victory over Salford at Rochdale, with captain Bob Wilson the first player to score three tries in a final.

=== 1906–1917: Early success ===
Rangers appeared in successive Lancashire Cup finals in 1906–07 and 1907–08, beating Warrington 15–6 at Central Park, Wigan but losing to Oldham 16–9 at Rochdale 12 months later. The Rangers reached the top-four semi-finals in 1907–08, losing to All Four Cups winners Hunslet.

In October 1907, Broughton Rangers lost 14–20 to New Zealand during their All Golds tour. New Zealand led early in the game and despite a Rangers comeback, the tourists won in front of 24,000 spectators.

The club won the 1910–11 Challenge Cup, beating Wigan 4–0 at the Willows, Salford in front of a crowd of 8,000.

Broughton's last game at Wheater's Field was against St. Helens on 9 April 1913 before moving to the Cliff on Lower Broughton Road, Higher Broughton.

=== Inter-war years ===
Broughton's highest league position between 1918 and 1939 was sixth in 1935–36 and its lowest, 27th in 1927–28, with Rangers generally finishing in the bottom half of the league. The only trophy won in the inter-war years was the 1920–21 Lancashire Cup, when they defeated Leigh 6–3 at Salford in front of 25,000 spectators.

In 1933, Broughton Rangers moved to Belle Vue Stadium, inside the speedway track. On 18 September 1935 Rangers signed future Lance Todd Trophy winner Frank Whitcombe from Army Rugby Union, buying him out of the army for a fee of £100. Two years later in 1938, they sold him to Bradford Northern for £850, a world record fee for a front row forward.

In 1941–42 the club dropped out of the wartime emergency league and did not return to league competition until 1945–46.

=== Belle Vue Rangers ===
In 1946–47, Broughton was renamed Belle Vue Rangers, and reached the Lancashire Cup final, a 9–3 defeat by Wigan at Station Road, Swinton. The club repeated this feat in 1947–48; losing again to Wigan 10–7 at Wilderspool, Warrington.

After the war, Rangers finished mid-table or above but after finishing 12th in 1950–51, Rangers finished 30th, second from bottom in 1954–55, its last season before the club folded.

== Colours ==
The club's earliest recorded colours are amber and navy blue. In 1888 they changed to light blue and white hoops, and by 1896 the club had adopted navy and white hoops, which they retained until at least 1936, with black shorts and socks.

== Stadia ==
- Belle Vue Stadium, Manchester, 1933–55
- The Cliff, Higher Broughton, Salford, 1913–33
- Wheater's Field, Lower Broughton, Salford, 1892–1913

== Honours ==
- Rugby Football League Championship: 1
  - 1901–02
- Challenge Cup: 2
  - 1901–02, 1910–11
- Lancashire Cup: 2
  - 1906–07, 1920–21
- Lancashire League: 2
  - 1896–97, 1898–99

== Players earning international caps while at Broughton Rangers/Belle Vue Rangers ==
- Billy Bentham won caps for England while at Broughton 1922 Wales, 1926 Wales, and won caps for Great Britain while at Broughton 1924 New Zealand (2 matches)
- George Bunter won a cap for England while at Broughton 1940 Wales
- "Bert" Cambridge won a cap for England while at Broughton 1935 France
- James "Jim" Clampitt won caps for England while at Broughton 1909 Wales, 1911 Wales, Australia, 1912 Wales, 1913 Wales, 1914 Wales won caps, and won caps for Great Britain while at Broughton 1908 New Zealand, 1911 Australia, 1914 New Zealand
- James "Jim" Cumberbatch won caps for England while at Broughton 1937 France, while at Newcastle 1938 Wales
- John "Jack" Flynn won a cap for England while at Broughton 1908 New Zealand
- John "Jack" Garvey won caps for England while at St. Helens 1933 Other Nationalities, while at Broughton 1936 Wales
- Elwyn Gwyther represented Wales XV (RU) while at Llanelli RFC in the 'Victory International' non-Test matches between December 1945 and April 1946, and won caps for Wales (RL) while at Belle Vue Rangers, and Leeds 1947...1953 15-caps, and won caps for Great Britain (RL) while at Belle Vue Rangers in 1947 against New Zealand (2 matches), in 1950 against Australia (3 matches), and in 1951 against New Zealand
- Andrew Hogg won caps for England while at Broughton 1908 Wales, New Zealand, and won caps for Great Britain while at Broughton 1908 New Zealand won caps for Other Nationalities while at Broughton ?-caps
- Edward "Ned" Jones won a cap for Wales while at Broughton Rangers 1913 1-cap
- Glyn Jones won a cap for Wales while at Broughton Rangers 1946 1-cap
- Stan McCormick won caps for England while at Belle Vue 1948 Wales, France, while at St. Helens 1949 Wales, France, 1951 Wales, 1953 France (2 matches), Wales, and won caps for Great Britain while at Belle Vue 1948 Australia (2 matches), while at St. Helens Australia
- Doug Phillips won caps for Wales while at Oldham and Belle Vue Rangers 1945...1951 9-caps, and won caps, and won caps for Great Britain while at Oldham in 1946 against Australia (3 matches), and while at Belle Vue Rangers in 1950 against Australia
- Robert "Bob" Poole won a cap for England while at Broughton 1905 Other Nationalities
- John "Jack" Price won caps for England while at Broughton 1921 Australia, while at Wigan 1922 Wales, 1924 Other Nationalities, and won caps for Great Britain while at Broughton 1921–22 Australia (2 matches), while at Wigan 1924 Australia (2 matches), New Zealand (2 matches)
- Ray Price won caps for Wales while at Belle Vue Rangers 1948...1953 6-caps, and won caps for Great Britain while at Warrington in 1954 against Australia, and New Zealand (2 matches), in 1955 against New Zealand, in 1956 against Australia (3 matches), and in 1957 against France (2 matches)
- Arthur "Artie" V. Royle won a cap for England (RU) while at Broughton in 1889 against New Zealand Natives
- George Ruddick won caps for Wales while at Broughton Rangers 1908...1910 3-caps, and won caps for Great Britain while at Broughton Rangers in 1908 against New Zealand (2 matches), and in 1910 against Australia, and Australasia
- Robert Seddon won caps for England (RU) while at Broughton Rangers in 1887 against Wales, Ireland and Scotland. He was also the first captain of a British Isles team in 1888 and died on the tour.
- Billy Stott (1946 Challenge Cup Winner and 1946 Lance Todd Trophy Winner with while at Wakefield Trinity) won a cap for England while at Broughton 1936 Wales
- Alfred Teggin won caps for England (RU) while at Broughton Rangers in 1884 against Ireland, in 1885 against Wales, in 1886 against Ireland and Scotland, and in 1887 against Ireland, and Scotland
- Ernest "Ernie" Thompson won a cap for England while at Broughton 1936 Wales
- Melbourne "Mel" Tierney won a cap for Wales while at Belle Vue Rangers 1953 1-cap
- Frank Whitcombe won caps for Wales while at Broughton Rangers, and Bradford Northern 1938...1948 14-caps, and won caps for Great Britain while at Bradford Northern in 1946 against Australia (2 matches). Lance Todd Trophy winner at Wembley 1948
- Robert "Bob" Wilson won a cap for England while at Broughton 1905 Other Nationalities

== Other notable players ==
- Edward Arthur Ashworh Hooker 1945–46
- Eric Ayles c. 1953
- William H. "Billy" Barlow 1911 Challenge Cup winner
- James Leonard Battersby halfback mid-1920s, also North Sydney
- George Beatty c. 1953
- Harry Dagnan c. 1953
- David "Dai" Morgan Davies
- Derek Day c. 1953
- William "Billy" Dingsdale
- George Dixon
- John "Jack" Elwyn Evans
- Jim Featherstone
- Maurice Gallagher c. 1953
- Albert Gregory c. 1953
- Bryn Howells
- Bill Hunt c. 1953
- David James
- Evan James
- Jack Mannion c. 1953
- Edward Melling
- Dai Morgan c. 1953
- Harry Pimblett c. 1953
- Stanley Powell
- Dai Rees c. 1953
- Tommy Rees
- J. Robertson Lancashire against Middlesex at The Oval on Saturday 12 March 1887
- J. Scott c. 1922
- Thomas Steele (VC)
- Billy Teall
- Jack Tonge c. 1953
- Silas Warwick
